= Seymour Guado =

Character from Final Fantasy series

- Final Fantasy character
- Artwork by Tetsuya Nomura of Seymour
- First game: Final Fantasy X (2001)
- Created by: Kazushige Nojima
- Designed by: Tetsuya Nomura
- Voiced by: EN: Alex Fernandez; JA: Junichi Suwabe
- Motion capture: Ichiro Kato
- Portrayed by: Onoe Matsuya II

In-universe information
- Race: Half Guado
- Weapon: Staff
- Home: Baaj (prior to the events of Final Fantasy X), Guadosalam (during Final Fantasy X)

Seymour Guado (Japanese: シーモア＝グアド, Hepburn: Shīmoa-Guado) is a fictional video game character in Square Enix's Final Fantasy series who appears as a major antagonist and temporarily playable character in the 2001 role-playing video game Final Fantasy X. Seymour is a 28-year-old mage and priest of the fictional religion of Yevon. He is half-human and half Guado, as his father Jyscal Guado married a human woman in hopes that it would improve relations between their races. His father was a maester in the Church of Yevon, which controls the fictional and theocratic world of Spira. Prior to the events of the game, Seymour killed Jyscal in order to inherit his position. Seymour also holds the position of Minister of Temple Affairs, which oversees summoners. A summoner himself, he attempts to use his stature to manipulate the fledgling summoner Yuna into aiding him with his goal of becoming the monster Sin, believing the only way to end the suffering the creature inflicts onto the world is to use its powers to permanently end all life in Spira.

He has appeared in other video games in the Final Fantasy franchise, including the Final Fantasy X sequel Final Fantasy X-2 and various spin-off games such as the Dissidia Final Fantasy and Theatrhythm Final Fantasy series.

Seymour has been generally well-received by video game critics for his role in the narrative and challenge level. He frequently ranks as one of the most memorable antagonists in the Final Fantasy series due to his nihilistic personality and his unwillingness to accept defeat.

== Creation and development ==
Seymour's design was created by Final Fantasy artist Tetsuya Nomura. During the development of Final Fantasy X, it was proposed that characters grow stronger through a "tattoo system" where the player would have leveled up by placing tattoos on a grid. To reflect this, Seymour — as well as Jecht and Brother — were designed with large, prominent tattoos. Though this proposed system was scrapped during development, Seymour's final character design retained his chest tattoo.

Junichi Suwabe, the character's Japanese voice actor, was not originally planning on auditioning for the role of Seymour. He first auditioned to play the roles of Tidus and Jecht, later trying to read Auron's lines before finding Seymour's dialogue in his additional materials.

== Appearances ==
=== Final Fantasy X ===
Seymour is a major antagonist in Final Fantasy X, who is first introduced as a nominal ally. Born to a Guado father and a human mother, Seymour faced prejudice from members of both races. His father, Jyscal Guado, a high-ranking member of the clergy, ordered the exile of Seymour and his mother to the remote island of Baaj during his childhood. Believing there was no other way for him to be accepted, his mother brought him to Zanarkand where she sacrificed herself to become the aeon Anima and intended for him to use her powers to defeat Sin. He would instead spend the remainder of his youth isolated in the Baaj temple, forming twisted views on life and death. Motivated by his belief that the suffering caused by Sin is inescapable and that peace can only be attained in death, Seymour plots to become Sin himself to destroy all of Spira. Shortly before the events of the game, Seymour murdered his father to inherit his power and influence, putting his plans into motion.

The game's protagonists first meet Seymour before a blitzball match, where he is introduced to the public as Yevon's newest maester. The match is interrupted when the stadium is swarmed by monsters Seymour secretly unleashed, only so that he could eliminate them using Anima in a staged show of strength. He then attempts to court Yuna as means to becoming her final aeon. However, the party soon learns of Jyscal's murder and confronts Seymour. Realizing that he can no longer achieve his goals by gaining Yuna's trust, Seymour instead chooses to enact his plans by force, and attempts to kill her party. Seymour dies in battle, but remains in the world as an unsent spirit.

Following his defeat, Yuna is captured by Seymour's guardians and brought to Bevelle, the capital of Spira's theocracy. Tidus and his party arrive to find the two at a staged wedding ceremony. The party tries to prevent the wedding, but they end up being held at gunpoint and used as leverage to force Yuna to marry Seymour. Once the wedding is over, Yuna and her party are captured and put on trial for treason. The trial is judged by the four maesters of Yevon, including Seymour. Yuna is sentenced to death, and Seymour offers to kill her personally. Distrustful of Seymour's intentions, maester Kinoc insists on joining him. As Yuna tries to escape, Seymour kills Kinoc and presents his corpse to the party. He reveals his plan to become Sin, and proceeds to absorb Kinoc's spirit as he shapeshifts into a monstrous form. The party defeats him a second time and continues their journey, now viewed as traitors by the Church. At Mt. Gagazet, Seymour makes a last-ditch effort to prevent Yuna from reaching Zanarkand without him, killing numerous members of the Ronso tribe and using their spirits to transform once again, only for him to be defeated a third time.

At Zanarkand, Yuna learns that acquiring the final aeon used to defeat Sin requires sacrificing someone close to her, only for this aeon to become the next Sin. She instead opts to break the cycle, rendering Seymour's plans moot. Yuna and her party then travel inside of Sin to defeat it, where they find that Seymour's spirit had been absorbed by it. He reveals that he now intends to control the current Sin from within, and battles the party a final time. Yuna sends his spirit to the afterlife, ending his presence in the world.

=== Sequels and spinoffs ===
Following the events of Final Fantasy X, Seymour has a minor role in its sequel, Final Fantasy X-2. During X-2's main story, the character appears only in a flashback cutscene. In the Final Fantasy X-2 International edition of the game, additional side content gives the player the option to battle Seymour and recruit him as a playable character.

Seymour appears as a playable character in the 2017 game Dissidia Final Fantasy Opera Omnia. Seymour was initially considered to represent Final Fantasy X in the 2008 Dissidia Final Fantasy, which included one protagonist and one antagonist character from each Final Fantasy game. In an interview, developer Tetsuya Nomura stated that they ultimately decided to have Jecht appear in the 2008 game instead as his character is a foil to Tidus, while Seymour would have been a foil to Yuna.

In the Theatrhythm Final Fantasy series, Seymour makes recurring appearances as a playable character in Theatrhythm Final Fantasy: All-Star Carnival and Theatrhythm Final Bar Line, while also appearing as a non-playable enemy character.

== Reception ==
Engadget praised that the character was "created to be resented," making it more satisfying to defeat him, commenting that he inspired a "near-instant hatred" which "only deepened with each of his appearances." An article in TheGamer praised Seymour's character design and personality, commenting that his traditional robes reflect that he is part of the old guard, while the boldness of his design makes him stand out, reflecting his own ambitions. The entertainment website Việt Giải Tri wrote that his character design communicates to the player that Seymour is an antagonist before the game's story makes this clear. IGN was more critical of his appearance, listing Seymour's hairstyle as one of the worst in video game history.

Seymour was compared favorably to other antagonists in Final Fantasy X by the IDN Times, which argued that the large amount of screentime he received throughout the main storyline made him a more memorable character. Green Man Gaming opined that Seymour is among the most memorable antagonists in the series due to his influential role in the game's world and his sinister intentions. In a Yahoo! Voices article, Seymour's familiar Anima was praised for its symbolism, with the author regarding it as "an astonishing collective of symbols and themes, perfectly wrapping up the many competing elements of Final Fantasy X." Yuna's abortive wedding with Seymour was ranked as the third most memorable matrimony in the history of PlayStation by Official PlayStation Magazine in 2014.

An article in The Outline mentioned that the character's challenging battles contributed to Final Fantasy X having "exciting and strategic" gameplay. A reviewer for the entertainment website Cinelinx praised the third battle against Seymour for its difficulty, writing "To this day, the victory over Seymour is still one of my all-time favorite video game moments."

In the 2009 thesis Final Fantasy X and Video Game Narrative: Re-Imagining the Quest Story, literary scholar Mark Host writes "Seymour is interesting in that he is the antithesis of Tidus, and more than a mere obstacle to the party." Host likens Tidus and Seymour to the epic characters Beowulf and Grendel, as both Grendel and Seymour were social outcasts who lived in exile. Host also argues the similarities between the characters' backstories extend to their reasons for being exiled, with Grendel's banishment being a result of his father murdering a family member, while Seymour's exiling was ordered by his father and preceded his murder.

In his Meaning and emotion in Squaresoft's Final Fantasy X: Re-theorising realism and identification in video games, media studies lecturer Glen Spoors argues that the "constant re-typing of Seymour is central to FFX's hermeneutics", noting that his perception by the player evolves from "romantic competitor" and "young leader" to "politician" and "treacherous tyrant", "patricidal" and "genocidal lunatic", to eventually "psychologically disturbed." Spoors considers his character design to be a collection of taboos, most notably miscegenation, while also suggesting that the character has a sexually ambiguous presentation. Spoors regards Seymour as a false hero and draws parallels between him and the story's over-arching antagonist, Yu Yevon, arguing that the two are an allegory for "how giving into fear and hate can give rise to escalating, pointless suffering."
