= Characters of Final Fantasy X and X-2 =

Main characters of Final Fantasy X, as shown from left to right: Kimahri Ronso, Rikku, Auron, Yuna, Lulu, Tidus and Wakka.

Characters of Final Fantasy X-2, as shown from left to right: Nooj, Rikku, Paine, Yuna, Lenne and Shuyin.

Square's 2001 role-playing video game Final Fantasy X is the tenth game of the Final Fantasy series. It features several fictional characters designed by Tetsuya Nomura, who wanted the main characters' designs and names to be connected with their personalities and roles in the plot. The game takes place in Spira, which features multiple tribes. The game's sequel, Final Fantasy X-2, was released in 2003. It takes place two years after the events of Final Fantasy X and features both new and returning characters.

There are seven main playable characters in the game, most prominently protagonist Tidus, a skilled blitzball player from Zanarkand who becomes lost in the world of Spira after an encounter with an enormous creature called Sin and searches for a way home. He joins the summoner Yuna, who travels towards Zanarkand's ruins to defeat Sin alongside her guardians: Kimahri Ronso, a member of the Ronso tribe; Wakka, the captain of the blitzball team in Besaid; Lulu, a stoic black mage; Auron, a famous warrior and an old acquaintance of Tidus; and Rikku, Yuna's cousin who searches for a way to avoid Yuna's sacrifice in the fight against Sin. The leader of the Guado tribe, Seymour Guado, briefly joins the party for a fight, but is revealed to be an antagonist in his quest to replace Tidus' father, Jecht, to become the new Sin. Final Fantasy X-2 features Yuna, Rikku, and the newly introduced Paine as playable characters in their quest to find spheres across Spira and find clues regarding Tidus' current location. During their journey, they meet Paine's former comrades, who are related to the spirit of an avenger named Shuyin.

The creation of these characters brought the Square staff several challenges, as Final Fantasy X was the first game in the franchise to feature voice acting. They also had to feature multiple tribes from different parts from Spira with distinctive designs. Various types of merchandising based on the characters have been released. The characters from Final Fantasy X and its sequel were praised by video game publications, owing to their personalities and designs. The English voice acting initially received mixed response, but X-2's dub received a better response.

== Cast creation and influences ==
Tetsuya Nomura was the character designer for Final Fantasy X and X-2. Since art director Yusuke Naora convinced the Square staff to make Final Fantasy X an Asian-themed game, Nomura designed the characters to give them an Asian look. Nomura first illustrated the characters' faces and started adding details upon receiving information from the staff. Since the PlayStation 2's capabilities allowed for featuring more detail, Nomura did so with the characters and asked the staff to make them consistent. The hardest part of his work involved making the characters' clothes identical between full motion scenes and in-game.

Nomura has expressed that after designing serious and moody main characters for Final Fantasy VII and VIII, he wanted to give Tidus a cheerful attitude and appearance. This is reflected in the name Nojima chose for him, as Tiida is the Okinawan word for "sun". Nomura has also mentioned a contrast between the lead male and female protagonists was established by Yuna's name meaning "night" in Okinawan. Since Tidus did not originate from Spira, his outfit was made to stand out from those of the world's inhabitants. Nomura also placed image colors to each main character to give hints regarding their personalities. Since both the player and the main character find themselves in a new world, Nojima wanted Tidus' understanding of the world to reflect the player's progress, a connection that allowed the player to advance Tidus' first-person narration of most of Final Fantasy X.

Sub-character chief designer Fumi Nakashima's focus was to ensure that characters from different regions and cultures bore distinctive characteristics in their clothing styles, so that they could be quickly and easily identified as members of their respective sub-groups. For example, she has said that the masks and goggles of the Al Bhed give them a "strange and eccentric" appearance, while the Ronso's attire lend to them being able to easily engage in battle.

Final Fantasy X features innovations in the rendering of characters' facial expressions, achieved through motion capture and skeletal animation technology. This technology allowed animators to create realistic lip movements, which were then programmed to match the speech of the game's voice actors. Nojima has revealed that the inclusion of voice acting enabled him to express emotion more powerfully than before, and he was therefore able to keep the storyline simple. He also said that the presence of voice actors led him to make various changes to the script, in order to match the voice actors' personalities with the characters they were portraying. Despite being worried about the inclusion of voice acting, Nomura was satisfied when hearing their clips, as he said that the characters became full of life. The voice acting brought difficulties in the making of the English version of the game, as the localization team had to translate Japanese dialogue into English-oriented lines that would fit the characters' lip movements.

Before starting development of Final Fantasy X-2, Square had planned to make a game following the story of Jecht, Auron and Braska ten years before the events of FFX, but they felt that they would end with a "traditional game". For X-2, while Nomura still remained as character designer, Tetsu Tsukamoto designed the new costumes of the main characters to distance the game from its predecessor. The outfits are meant to represent the changes in the world of Spira after two years of peace. The use of three female characters was inspired by multiple films that depict strong female leads. To reinforce this concept, the staff made sure to make the protagonists still look feminine while changing into multiple type of warriors such as the Samurai form, in which the characters wield large swords.

== Main protagonists ==
=== Tidus ===
Voiced by: Masakazu Morita (Japanese); James Arnold Taylor (Final Fantasy series), Shaun Fleming (Kingdom Hearts series) (English)
Motion capture: Masakazu Morita

Tidus (ティーダ, Tīda) is a skilled 17-year-old blitzball player from Zanarkand and the main protagonist of Final Fantasy X. Though Tidus is his official name, the player has the option of renaming him at the beginning of the game. He washes up near Besaid Island after the creature Sin attacks him during a blitzball game. He becomes one of Yuna's guardians to find a way back to Zanarkand during the journey. Throughout the game, he finds himself coming to terms with his father, Jecht, who has become Sin, dealing with his increasing love for Yuna and the implications of her pilgrimage. In the audio drama Final Fantasy X -Will-, which is set a year after X-2, Tidus is a star blitzball player in Bevelle, where he meets Kurgum and Chuami. His outfit was designed to stand out within the people from Spira due to being from another world, while his lively personality is meant to contrast with previous Final Fantasy protagonists. Tidus has also been featured in the Kingdom Hearts series and is the hero representing Final Fantasy X in Dissidia Final Fantasy.

=== Yuna ===
Voiced by: Mayuko Aoki (Japanese); Hedy Burress (English)
Motion capture: Mayuko Aoki

Yuna (ユウナ, Yūna) is a 17-year-old summoner from Spira. In Final Fantasy X, she is the daughter of the late High Summoner Braska, who defeated Sin ten years ago, and seeks to accomplish the same task with help from her guardians. While often serious and naïve, she gradually becomes more open and falls in love with Tidus during their journey. Two years after the conclusion of Final Fantasy X, she is now 19 years old and is spurred on a journey of self-discovery by the possibility of reuniting with Tidus. She is the main character of Final Fantasy X-2. In Final Fantasy X -Will-, Yuna is a priestess acting as an advisor to the Yevoners organization. Yuna has also been featured in Kingdom Hearts II and Dissidia 012 Final Fantasy.

=== Auron ===
Voiced by: Hideo Ishikawa (Japanese); Matt McKenzie (English)
Motion capture: Jun Ishii

Auron (アーロン, Āron) is a 35-year-old warrior known as the Legendary Guardian, who helped Jecht and Braska defeat Sin. Shortly after Sin's defeat, Auron started watching over Tidus from afar at Jecht's request. In the game's present day, he sends Tidus to Spira using the new Sin Jecht. After reuniting with Tidus, they start serving as guardians for Yuna, Braska's daughter, in another journey to defeat Sin. It is eventually revealed that Auron attacked the unsent summoner Yunalesca in a fit of rage after she revealed that Braska and Jecht needlessly gave their lives against Sin, and that she mortally wounded him. Despite his injuries, Auron managed to make it down Mt. Gagazet to just outside Bevelle. As he was dying, he met Kimahri Ronso and asked him to fulfill the promise he had made to Braska: that Yuna be moved from Bevelle to Besaid so she can have a peaceful childhood. Afterward, he became an unsent, and secretly held this status for most of the game. At the end of the game, after Sin's creator, Yu Yevon, is defeated, he is laid to rest. Auron briefly appears in Final Fantasy X-2, where his voice helps Yuna during her battle in the Farplane with Vegnagun. The updated International version added Auron both as a boss and as an optional playable character. In the audio drama Final Fantasy X -Will-, Chuami claims to be Auron's daughter based on stories told to her by her late mother.

While the developers originally considered having Final Fantasy X-2 follow the story of Auron and Jecht's generation, they eventually let this idea pass due to the concept making the game "too traditional", deciding instead to go with the trio of Yuna, Rikku, and Paine. In initial versions of Auron was a Crusader, an exterminator of monsters from Zanarkand, but as the story involved deceased people, the staff decided to make him an Unsent. Auron was planned to be Jecht in disguise, but this idea was scrapped.

Auron appears in Kingdom Hearts II as a party member in the world of Olympus Coliseum. Hades resurrects him to kill Hercules, but Auron refuses to aid him. He joins Sora's group in escaping from the Underworld, but Hades later brainwashes him into fighting Hercules. During the battle, Sora restores Auron's free will, and he joins them and Hercules to defeat Hades. A super-deformed version of Auron appears in Itadaki Street Special.

In 2008, GamesRadar ranked Auron's glasses tenth in "The top 10 famous glasses". Auron ranked fifth on Electronic Gaming Monthly's Top Ten Badass Undead. In a Famitsu poll done in February 2010, Auron was voted by readers as the thirty-third most popular video game character. In its December 2010 cover feature, Game Informer named Auron one of their "30 characters who defined a decade", describing him as "one of the most complex RPG companions in gaming history". In 2011, GamesRadar used Auron as an example of a badass commenting: "A smooth-talking, shades-wearing, longcoat rocking snarker who can wield a huge sword with his one good arm. He is a badass, and nobody can deny it. With that perfect storm of cool, he has nothing to worry about". In 2013, Complex ranked Auron fourth in "The 20 Greatest Final Fantasy Characters of All Time" and eighteenth in their "25 Dead Video Game Characters We Wish Were Still Here". In 2020, NHK conducted an All-Final Fantasy Grand Poll of Japanese players, featuring over 468,000 votes. Auron was voted as the 15th best character in the series. In 2021, Den of Geek ranked Auron number 6 among the "15 Best Final Fantasy Characters".

=== Wakka ===
Voiced by: Kazuya Nakai (Japanese); John DiMaggio (Final Fantasy series), Dee Bradley Baker (Kingdom Hearts) (English)
Motion capture: Akihiko Kikuma

Wakka (ワッカ) is a 23-year-old professional blitzball player who is characterized by his long reddish-orange hair, which is worn in a quiff, and his tall and muscular stature. He uses speech-mannerisms as saying "brudda" for "brother" and sometimes finishing sentences with "ya?" for "right?" or "okay?" In addition to being one of Yuna's guardians and childhood friends, he is captain of the Besaid Aurochs, a blitzball team that – as of the beginning of Final Fantasy X – went ten years without winning a single game.

Wakka's younger brother Chappu was killed by Sin a year before the events of Final Fantasy X, and he never fully recovered from it. He forms a close brotherly relationship with Tidus, partially fueled by his resemblance to Chappu, though Lulu constantly has to remind him that Tidus is not Chappu. As a devout follower of Yevon's teachings, Wakka believes that anyone who does not believe in Yevon, like the Al Bhed, are evil heathens, and is staunchly against the use of machina. However, he begins to question his faith by the time Yevon's true colors are exposed to the world. Near the game's ending, Wakka denounces his prior beliefs entirely.

Six months after the events of Final Fantasy X, he marries Lulu. In Final Fantasy X-2, he becomes a father to their baby son, Vidina, a name thought up by Wakka. A younger version of Wakka appears in Kingdom Hearts on Destiny Islands as a friend of a younger Tidus and Final Fantasy VIII's Selphie, and as a sparring partner who can be engaged in battle, fighting with a beach ball. He also appears in Kingdom Hearts: Chain of Memories and Kingdom Hearts coded.

=== Lulu ===
Voiced by: Rio Natsuki (Japanese); Paula Tiso (English)
Motion capture: Yoko Yoshida

Lulu (ルールー, Rūrū) is a 22-year-old black magic user and an older sister figure to Yuna, whom she grew up with alongside Wakka and Chappu on Besaid Island. Before becoming one of Yuna's guardians, she had previously accompanied two other summoners as their guardians. Lulu had been romantically involved with Wakka's younger brother, Chappu, and his death at the hands of Sin affected her greatly. While she is often stern and scathing, particularly to Wakka, she is caring toward others. Wakka and Lulu fall in love and marry six months after Final Fantasy X. She appears in a reduced role for Final Fantasy X-2, where she has a son with Wakka named Vidina. In the audio drama Final Fantasy X -Will-, Lulu is the mayor of Besaid Village.

=== Kimahri Ronso ===
Voiced by: Katsumi Chō (Japanese); John DiMaggio (English)
Motion capture: Tesshin Murata

Kimahri Ronso (キマリ＝ロンゾ, Kimari-Ronzo) is a 25-year-old warrior from the Ronso tribe and Yuna's first and most faithful guardian. He fulfills the role of "body man", being the guardian with the closest and constant physical contact with Yuna at all times. He has known and protected her since she was seven years old. He is not well accepted by the other Ronso, who view him as inferior due to his shorter stature and broken horn. When Tidus' group arrives at Mount Gagazet, Kimahri is confronted by Biran and Yenke Ronso, who challenge him to a 2-on-1 battle. Following Kimahri's victory, he proves his worth as a Ronso.

After departing from Mt. Gagazet in shame ten years before the events of Final Fantasy X, Kimahri discovered a dying Auron outside Bevelle. Auron told Kimahri about Braska's daughter and asked him to fulfill a promise he had made to Braska in his stead: to remove Yuna from Bevelle and transport her to the island of Besaid, where she may grow up peacefully. Kimahri honored Auron's request and ensured that Yuna arrived at Besaid safely. When his task was completed, he prepared to depart; however, Yuna pleaded with him to remain with her, and he complied.

In Final Fantasy X-2, Kimahri is depicted as the new Elder of the Ronso tribe. Kimahri's difficulties as chief comprise several playable missions, most notably involving a disagreement he has with a young Ronso named Garik, who desires to seek vengeance on the Guado for the Ronsos killed by Seymour in the previous game. He also seeks to find two Ronso children, Lian and Ayde, who are in search of adventure and a way to fix Kimahri's broken horn. Eventually, Kimahri realizes that all Ronso should follow Lian and Ayde's example in following their individual paths while working together to forge a better future, and that he alone cannot provide a single answer to what the future of the group should be.

=== Rikku ===
Voiced by: Marika Matsumoto (Japanese); Tara Strong (English)
Motion capture: Miyuki Shimizu (FFX), Natsuho Matsuda (FFX-2)

Rikku (リュック, Ryukku) is a 15-year-old Al Bhed girl who is Cid's daughter and Brother's younger sister. She helps Tidus when he first arrives in Spira, but then disappears during an attack from Sin. Upon reuniting with Tidus at the Moonflow, she becomes the last character to join Yuna's entourage of guardians. Her attitude is somewhat childish, but is also cheerful and positive. She is afraid of lightning because of an incident that occurred when she was a child. When she was attacked by a water elemental at the beach, Brother destroyed it using Thunder spell, but this electrocuted her too. This was shown at the Thunder Plain. Cid's sister later married Braska, making him Rikku's uncle and her Yuna's cousin. As such, she wishes to prevent her from going through with her pilgrimage, as summoners die after defeating Sin. Rikku returns in Final Fantasy X-2 as a protagonist, now 17 years old. She convinces Yuna to leave Besaid on a journey after showing her a mysterious sphere featuring a person resembling Tidus.

Rikku appears in Theatrhythm Final Fantasy: Curtain Call as a playable character. Her appearance resembles as a chibi-esque version of her Final Fantasy X-2 character. Rikku also appears alongside Yuna and Paine in Kingdom Hearts II as a miniature fairy version of herself wearing modified versions of her Final Fantasy X-2 attire. Itadaki Street Special features a miniature Rikku in her Final Fantasy X-2 outfit, along with Yuna and Paine. Rikku also appears as a non-playable character in World of Final Fantasy. Several figurines of Rikku were released by various manufacturers, including by Coca-Cola and Square Soft in 2000 (two), Kotobukiya in 2001, Bandai in 2002, 2003 and 2005, Hobby Japan in 2003, Kotabukiya and Square Enix in 2003, Square Enix in 2003 (three) and 2006, and Square Enix and Amono Shiro in 2008. A special PlayStation memory card was also released by Hori in 2003.

Rikku's outfit changed from a casual outfit to a skimpier outfit from Final Fantasy X to X-2. Tetsu Tsukamoto, the alternate costume designer, explains that the change could come from the changes in Spira from the two titles from a "darker, religious feel". The decision to pick Rikku as one of the three female leads came early on in the design process of X-2, due to the developers challenging themselves to create an all-female character party. Yuna and Rikku were the original choices.

Rikku won the award for "Hottest Character" at G4's 2004 G-Phoria award show and "Baddest Good Girl" at their 2005 Video Game Vixens award show. In a Famitsu poll done in February 2010, Rikku was voted by readers as the fiftieth most popular video game character. In official Square Enix poll, Rikku was voted the thirteenth favorite female Final Fantasy character in 2013.

=== Paine ===
Voiced by: Megumi Toyoguchi (Japanese); Gwendoline Yeo (English)
Motion capture: Yoko Yoshida

Paine (パイン, Pain) is an 18-year-old girl and a protagonist of Final Fantasy X-2. While Final Fantasy X characters Yuna and Rikku were planned as stars of X-2, she was created for X-2. Paine is prominently featured as a warrior. In contrast to Yuna and Rikku, she is more calm and reserved, with her comrades knowing little about her. Throughout the game, the player learns of Paine's experience as a member of the Crimson Squad, which was intended to be an elite unit to surpass the Crusaders; the best members were to be assigned to lead Crusader chapters across Spira. Paine had also been the recorder for a group of candidates named Nooj, Baralai, and Gippal, the game's present day leaders of the Youth League, New Yevon, and the Machine Faction, respectively.

Most Crimson Squad candidates died during the group's final field exercise due to the influence of the undead Shuyin, who caused them to turn on one another while getting a glimpse of Vegnagun. Only Nooj, Baralai, Gippal, and Paine escaped alive from the Yevon monks, but later, Nooj, who was possessed by Shuyin, fired on his friends, effectively ending their friendship for two years. Just before Yuna joined the Gullwings, Paine enlisted in the group in hopes of learning more about why the Crimson Squad was massacred, and because she had long desired to fly in an airship. In Final Fantasy X-2 International+Last Mission, Yuna, Rikku and Paine reunite after being disbanded three months after the game ended, exploring a newly discovered tower. Paine appears in Kingdom Hearts II with an updated super deformed and fairy-like design alongside Yuna and Rikku. Yeo explains that she both was given liberties in how she read the script, as well as watching scenes beforehand to figure how they should be said. Yeo found Paine to be true to life, commenting that the writers left "no stone unturned" with the plot and writing. She compared herself to Paine, describing her as similarly wry.

== Antagonists ==
=== Sin ===
Sin (シン, Shin) is an enormous creature that moves through Spira's oceans in its attacks towards mankind, killing many people and destroying towns. It is also capable of flight. Sin's form is vaguely whale-like in appearance, though vastly more massive and the creature is able to release remnants known as Sinspawns. Scenario writer Kazushige Nojima compared Sin to a typhoon due to the disaster it causes in the world.

Summoners are tasked with destroying Sin using a creature known as the Final Aeon, sacrificing themselves so Spira can enjoy a peaceful period known as the Calm until Sin is reborn. Unbeknownst to most of Spira, the Final Aeon is made from the fayth of one of the summoner's own guardians and is possessed by the spirit of Yu Yevon, Sin's creator, to be transformed into a new Sin after the previous Sin is destroyed. After the Final Aeon destroys the body or armor of the previous Sin, Yu Yevon possesses the Final Aeon and kills the summoner. Yu Yevon then uses the possessed Aeon's power to create a new Sin, with Jecht being the current incarnation during the events of Final Fantasy X. At the end of the game, the party fights and destroys each aeon possessed by Yu Yevon to draw him out into the open so that he can be destroyed. As Yu Yevon does not possess an aeon, it leaves him unable to create a new Sin. The final death of Sin marks the beginning of the Eternal Calm, as Spira is freed from its cycle of death and destruction.

=== Jecht ===
Voiced by: Masuo Amada (Japanese); Gregg Berger (English)
Motion capture: Hideki Yamazaki

Jecht (ジェクト, Jekuto) is Tidus' father and a blitzball celebrity in his hometown of Dream Zanarkand. Jecht is a tall, muscular, and surly man who wields a large sword. It is mentioned multiple times throughout the game that Tidus hates Jecht, as he often verbally abused him as a child; however, Jecht deeply loved Tidus, but found himself unable to express it in a kind way. Jecht became Nomura's favorite character from Final Fantasy X he designed as the finishing model was identical to his first sketches.

Before the start of Final Fantasy X, Sin took Jecht to Spira, and was presumed dead in Zanarkand. In Spira, Jecht joined Auron as one of Braska's guardians to defeat Sin. Having lost hope of returning home, Jecht sacrificed himself to become Braska's Final Aeon, which temporarily defeated Sin; beforehand, he requested that Auron take care of Tidus, believing that Auron could find a way to Dream Zanarkand, and Auron agreed. As a consequence, Jecht became the new Sin. Some time later, Jecht asserts some control over Sin, making his way to the Dream Zanarkand and communicating with Auron to transport Tidus to Spira's mainland, communicating with him so he could find a way to permanently dispose of Sin. Near the end of the game, Tidus' group confronts Jecht inside Sin taking the form of Braska's Final Aeon (ブラスカの究極召喚, Burasuka no Kyūkyoku Shōkan). Before Jecht's death in battle, Tidus makes peace with him.

Jecht appears in the final battles of Final Fantasy X-2 along with Braska and Auron, in which they give the protagonists encouragement and advice on where to strike at the machine Vegnagun. Jecht is the villain representing Final Fantasy X in Dissidia Final Fantasy. As revealed in the prequel Dissidia 012, Jecht is a Warrior of Cosmos, who gives up his position to save Tidus's life before he turned into a Warrior of Chaos. Jecht reappears as a playable character in Dissidia NT, where he reprises his role as the villain representing Final Fantasy X.

=== Seymour Guado ===
Voiced by: Junichi Suwabe (Japanese); Alex Fernandez (English)
Motion capture: Ichiro Katou

Seymour Guado (シーモア＝グアド, Shīmoa-Guado; formal titles: Maester or Lord Seymour) is the leader of the Guado nation, a race of demi-humans in Spira, as well as a maester of Yevon. He inherited both positions following the death of his father, Lord Jyscal Guado. Seymour is half-Guado and half-human, as his father married a human woman in an attempt to foster friendship between the Guado and human races. He is briefly playable during Operation Mi'ihen, a part of the game in which the Crusaders and the Al Bhed join forces to stop Sin.

While often formal, Seymour hides a twisted desire to save Spira by becoming Sin and destroying the world. This was a result of Jyscal's treatment, as he had his wife and Seymour exiled to the island of Baaj, as the Guados considered Seymour to be an abomination. Afterwards, Seymour's mother sacrificed herself in the Baaj Temple to become the fayth of the aeon Anima, believing that by sacrificing herself for Spira's temporary peace against Sin, Spira's people will accept him. When he was eighteen years old, Seymour's exile was revoked; he soon killed Jyscal and took his position. He asked Yuna to marry him, seemingly to further unite Spira, as they both have mixed parentage, being the offspring of a human and another race. Yuna's guardians killed Seymour after learning of his motives. However, Seymour's spirit is able to remain in the living world and become an unsent. Seymour later reveals his plans for Yuna – to have her turn him into the next Sin. Sin later absorbs his pyreflies. There, Seymour begins seeking a means to control Sin from within. During this process, Yuna and her guardians confront him and manage to break their way inside Sin. He is ultimately defeated, with Yuna sending him to the Farplane.

In Final Fantasy X-2, Seymour appears in a flashback cutscene that shows him assisting Baralai to hide from the Yevon Order. In Final Fantasy X-2 International, Seymour can be fought in the Battle Simulator tournament and be added as a member of the party.

=== Yunalesca ===
Voiced by: Yōko Koyanagi (Japanese); Julia Fletcher (English)

Yunalesca (ユウナレスカ, Yūnaresuka) is a legendary summoner and Yu Yevons' daughter from one millennium before the events of the games. She was the first person to defeat Sin using the process known as "the Final Summoning", sacrificing herself and her husband, Lord Zaon, in the process. Despite her death, Yunalesca remained as an unsent to instruct her successors in their pilgrimage to defeat Sin's incarnations. When Yuna and her guardians refuse to sacrifice anyone for the Final Summoning, Yunalesca fights the party, but is defeated and vanishes. She reappears in the Via Infinito in Final Fantasy X-2 as the fiend "Chac", while Zaon reappears as the fiend "Paragon".

=== Yu Yevon ===
Yu Yevon (エボン＝ジュ, Ebon-Ju) is the ruler of the original Zanarkand and Lady Yunalesca's father. Near the end of the war between Zanarkand and Bevelle, Yu Yevon and the remaining townspeople and summoners decided to preserve the overpowered Zanarkand at all costs. They all became fayth for the summoning of "Dream Zanarkand" and, after drawing upon millions of pyreflies with Gravity spells, he created Sin. The mental effort necessary to create both Dream Zanarkand and Sin essentially wiped Yu Yevon's mind clean and overwrote it with his final command: summon Dream Zanarkand and continuously create Sin. If Sin is destroyed, he recreates it by possessing the Final Aeon that defeats it. In the end, Tidus' group uses the aeons to weaken the disembodied spirit of Yu Yevon and destroy him.

=== Shuyin ===
Voiced by: Masakazu Morita (Japanese); James Arnold Taylor (English)

Shuyin (シューイン, Shūin) is the main antagonist of Final Fantasy X-2. He is a native blitzball star from Zanarkand who was alive during the age of the Machina War between Zanarkand and Bevelle. He is the lover of the summoner Lenne, and refused to accept her fate when she was ordered to the front lines and attempted to commandeer Bevelle's machina weapon, Vegnagun (ヴェグナガン, Vegunagan), in hopes of using it to end the war and save Lenne. Both Shuyin and Lenne were gunned down in front of Vegnagun after she prevented him from using it to kill people for her sake. After being sealed in the Den of Woes, Shuyin's unsent spirit was filled with despair and self-loathing, becoming incapable of fading away and free of his suffering. Shuyin desires to destroy Spira in the hopes that his agony can end and that there will never again be a war like the one that killed him and Lenne. Unlike other deceased people, Shuyin is called a "shadow" of his original self, being able to take a physical form. This allows him to possess people or fayths, using their aeons to help him. He is eventually defeated and reunited with Lenne before they fade away. In response to rumours that Tidus was created by the fayth based on Shuyin, Square said it cannot be certain that Tidus is a "duplication" of Shuyin due to the fact that the inhabitants of Dream Zanarkand began to blend in a different way from the real one.

== Other characters ==
=== Cid ===
Voiced by: Kōichi Sakaguchi (Japanese); Mike McShane (English)

Cid (シド, Shido) is the leader of the Al Bhed, Brother and Rikku's father, and Yuna's maternal uncle. He is responsible for bringing the Al Bhed together after Yevon scattered it years before the events of Final Fantasy X, and for abducting summoners after Braska's Calm to ensure that summoners after him, especially Yuna, would not needlessly sacrifice themselves to destroy Sin. This attack ultimately results in the Guado race attacking the Al Bhed's Home, forcing Cid to destroy it. He uses the airship his children salvaged, dubbed the Fahrenheit, to aid Tidus and company in fighting Sin. After the events of Final Fantasy X, Cid is one of the few to receive a negative impact from Sin's demise, as his children left him behind to set their sights on the changing Spira rather than rebuilding Home like most of the Al Bhed. In Final Fantasy X-2, he attempts to convert Zanarkand into a tourist attraction, only to make his way to the Thunder Plains. After being saved from an ancient Machina, Cid goes on board the Gullwings' Celsius, much to Brother's dismay. However, by Final Fantasy X-2 International + Last Mission, Cid returns to make business in Mt. Gagazet alongside his son.

=== Brother ===
Voiced by: Takayuki Yamaguchi (Japanese); David Rasner (English)

Brother (アニキ, Aniki) is Cid's 18-year-old son, Rikku's older brother, Braska's nephew, and Yuna's cousin. Brother participates in the Al Bhed expedition to salvage an airship from the ocean floor, where he meets Tidus. Eventually, he goes on to support his struggle against Sin and Yu Yevon as the pilot of the salvaged Fahrenheit. In Final Fantasy X-2, Brother is the pilot of his own airship, the Celsius, and leader of the Gullwings sphere hunter group alongside Buddy (ダチ, Dachi) and Shinra (シンラ). Having fallen out with Cid after the events of Final Fantasy X, they frequently — and unsuccessfully — try to bury the hatchet and make up. He has feelings for Yuna, and often flirts with her, much to Rikku's disgust. However, Brother eventually resigns himself to an unrequited love, preferring the Yuna he knew as two years ago compared to how she is now. In International + Last Mission, Brother helps his father with his business in Mt. Gagazet.

=== Lord Braska ===
Voiced by: Takuma Suzuki (Japanese); Andy Philpot (FFX), Dee Bradley Baker (FFX-2) (English)

Lord Braska (ブラスカ, Burasuka) is Yuna's father, Cid's brother-in-law, and Rikku and Brother's uncle. He is the summoner who defeated Sin and brought the Calm ten years before the events in Final Fantasy X, earning him the title of High Summoner. During a mission to repair relations with the Al Bhed, Braska met and fell in love with Cid's sister, and the two got married. A few years after Yuna's birth, Sin killed Braska's wife; as a result, Braska decided to become a summoner and embarked on a pilgrimage with his guardians, Auron and Jecht, to defeat Sin. People were initially skeptical about his and his guardians' ability to defeat Sin, but Braska reached Zanarkand, where he sacrificed himself to turn Jecht into the Final Aeon and defeat Sin.

=== Lenne ===
Voiced by: Kumi Koda (Japanese); Cree Summer (English)
Motion capture: Kumi Koda

Lenne (レン, Ren) is a famous songstress and summoner from Zanarkand during the time of the Machina War, and Shuyin's lover. She was forced to the front lines to fight with the other summoners in the city. Shuyin attempted to use Bevelle's machina weapon, Vegnagun, to defeat Bevelle and save her life. Lenne convinced Shuyin to stop but the couple was then gunned down by Bevelle soldiers. Upon her death, her spirit was somehow crystallized into Yuna's Songstress Dressphere, which contains her memories. Yuna begins to feel Lenne's presence and feelings more and more until they explode on stage. Because Yuna unknowingly serves as Lenne's host, Shuyin only sees Lenne rather than Yuna herself whenever she dons her Songtress outfit. After Shuyin is defeated, Lenne separates herself from the dressphere and fades with Shuyin while thanking Yuna for helping her.

=== Maechen ===
Voiced by: Takuma Suzuki (Japanese); Dwight Schultz (English)

Maechen (メイチェン, Meichen) is an elderly itinerant historian who often tells Tidus the history and origins of all things related to Spira. Although he seems to be an ordinary inhabitant of Spira, he reveals himself in Final Fantasy X-2 to be an unsent from Zanarkand who used to live before the city was destroyed, and was so engrossed in his studies that he forgot he died of old age. His memories of his time in Zanarkand are rekindled when he shakes Yuna's hand and realizes her resemblance to Lenne.

=== Chocobo Knights ===
Voiced by: Sayaka Ohara (Japanese); Candi Milo (English) (Lucil)
Voiced by: Sumomo Momomori (Japanese); Julia Fletcher (English) (Elma)
Voiced by: Takayuki Yamaguchi (Japanese); Matt K. Miller (English) (Clasko)

The Chocobo Knights are a team of Chocobo-riding soldiers: Lucil (ルチル, Ruchiru), the captain; Elma (エルマ, Eruma), the second-in-command; and Clasko (クラスコ, Kurasuko); they are the only named members of the group. Alongside the Crusaders and the Albhed, the group works in Operation Mi'hen in an attempt to defeat Sin. However, the plan fails and only the Chocobo Knights and one Chocobo survive to the fight against Sin. In Final Fantasy X-2, Lucil, Elma, and Clasko have joined the Youth League, although Clasko later leaves to become a Chocobo breeder.

=== Crusaders ===
Voiced by: Ryuzou Ishino (Japanese); John DeMita (English) (Luzzu)
Voiced by: Hiroshi Kamiya (Japanese); Adam Paul (English) (Gatta)

The Crusaders are a semi-military organization who serve to protect Spira's towns from Sin and other monsters. Lord Mi'hen founded it eight centuries before the events of Final Fantasy X, and are incorporated into the Yevon clergy. Members of the Crusaders include the high-ranked Luzzu and the younger, lower-ranked Gatta, while Wakka's brother, Chappu (チャップ) died a year ago fighting Sin. Depending on the player's actions, either Luzzu or Gatta dies during Operation Mi'hen, while the other survives and returns to Besaid to rebuild the village's Crusader branch.

=== Dona ===
Voiced by: Nanaho Katsuragi (Japanese); Candi Milo (English)

Dona (ドナ) is a 26-year-old female summoner who mocks Yuna for having a large group of guardians, while remarking that Lord Braska only needed two. Her guardian is Barthello (バルテロ, Barutero), an admirer of Auron who is significantly more friendly than Dona. After escaping from Home in the Airport, Tidus can influence Dona to either continue or quit her pilgrimage. In Final Fantasy X-2, Dona has joined the Youth League while Barthello has sided with New Yevon. Despite being on opposite sides of the conflict, they still have feelings for one another, which lead them to make up later.

=== Isaaru ===
Voiced by: Akio Suyama (Japanese); Quinton Flynn (English)

Isaaru (イサール, Isāru) is a summoner guarded by his younger brothers Pacce (パッセ, Passe) and Maroda (マローダ, Marōda). Isaaru has looked up to Braska since he was a child and sets up a challenge with Yuna to see who will defeat Sin first. At Besaid, the Al Bhed kidnap Isaaru's party and are present at Home's destruction. Yo Mika later sends him to prevent Yuna from escaping the Via Purifico, and reluctantly fights her with his Aeons. After being defeated, he remains in Bevelle to preserve order along with Pacce and Maroda. The three brothers part ways in Final Fantasy X-2. Isaaru helps out with the Ruin Tours in Zanarkand, Maroda joins the Youth League, and Pacce starts a sphere-hunting group known as "The Kinderguardians". Eventually, all three reunite in Bevelle and Maroda decides to assist Isaaru with his pursuits there.

=== Yevon Order ===
Voiced by: Hiroshi Iwasaki (Japanese); Dwight Schultz (English) (Mika)
Voiced by: Hidenari Ugaki (Japanese); Roger L. Jackson (English) (Kinoc)
Voiced by: Kōichi Sakaguchi (Japanese); Corey Burton (English) (Kelk)

The Yevon Order is a religious organization in Spira. It has been ruled by Grand Maester Yo Mika (ヨー=マイカ, Yō-Maika) since fifty years before the events of the game. When Yuna asks Yo Mika to send the unsent Seymour during her trial in Bevelle, Mika reveals that he too is an unsent, having remained in Spira to guide its people even after death. Although Mika condemns Yuna as a traitor for killing Seymour and questioning Yevon, he eventually repeals the condemnation in an attempt to prevent order from breaking down. When he learns that the party has defeated Yunalesca, and thus placed the Final Summoning out of reach, he departs to the Farplane, believing that the end of Spira is near.

The other Maesters include Wen Kinoc (ウェン=キノック, Wen-Kinokku), the leader of the Crusaders and Warrior Monks and old friend of Auron, who Seymour kills after Yuna's trial; Kelk Ronso (ケルク=ロンゾ, Keruku-Ronzo), a Yevon maester and leader of the Ronso tribe, who leaves the former after learning that Seymour had committed patricide but is killed by Seymour; and Jyscal Guado (ジスカル=グアド, Jisukaru-Guado), the deceased Maester of Yevon who was killed by his own son Seymour. However, during the events of Final Fantasy X-2, Jyscal, Kinoc, and Mika appear as unsent spirits within the depths of Bevelle's Via Infinito and become fiends.

=== Leblanc Syndicate ===
Voiced by: Satomi Yasuhara (Japanese); Masasa Moyo (English) (Leblanc)
Voiced by: Kiyotaka Furushima (Japanese); SARGE (English) (Ormi)
Voiced by: Nobuo Tobita (Japanese); S. Scott Bullock (English) (Logos)

The Leblanc Syndicate is a group of sphere hunters based in Guadosalam, and a rival of the Gullwings. Leblanc (ルブラン, Ruburan), the arrogant leader of the Syndicate, became a sphere hunter because of her infatuation with Meyvn Nooj. The syndicate is composed of Ormi (ウノー, Unō), Logos (サノー, Sanō), and others who were outcasts in some fashion until Leblanc helped them. As a result, they follow Leblanc out of dependence and gratitude. After learning that Vegnagun is hidden beneath Bevelle, Leblanc decides to team up with the Gullwings to infiltrate the city. When Vegnagun retreats from Bevelle and Nooj disappears, Leblanc becomes depressed and goes to search for Nooj; she eventually joins the Gullwings to get into the Farplane, find Nooj, and help fight Vegnagun.

=== Gippal ===
Voiced by: Kenichi Suzumura (Japanese); Rick Gomez (English)

Gippal (ギップル, Gippuru) is the founder of the Al Bhed Machine Faction group, which pioneers in machina research. Despite possessing heavy military power, they prefer to avoid interventions in politics and remain neutral. Gippal is also a former candidate for the Crimson Squad, who once served with Nooj and Baralai. Their friendship was broken on the day of their final candidate exercise, when they turned on each other while under Shuyin's control. Gippal dedicates himself to studying machina to subdue or destroy Shuyin's Vegnagun. During the game, he and his former comrades reunite to help save Spira from Shuyin.

=== Baralai ===
Voiced by: Kenji Sobu (Japanese); Joshua Gomez (English)
Motion capture: Akihiko Kikuma

Baralai (バラライ, Bararai) is the leader of the New Yevon Party organization, inspired by the defunct Yevon religion following the replacement of its founding leaders. Though New Yevon aims to make up for the former Yevon Order's transgressions and help those who feel overwhelmed by the rapid changes sweeping Spira, their ideals that a slow evolution of Spira's customs is the only way to prevent complete anarchy causes the Youth League to antagonize them for being as furtive as the Yevon clergy before them. Baralai is also a former Crimson Squad candidate who becomes involved in Shuyin's quest of revenge. Shuyin later possesses him to control Vegnagun, but leaves him upon Vegnagun's destruction. Shortly afterwards, Baralai reconciles with his old friends. In the audio drama Final Fantasy X -Will-, Baralai is chancellor of the Spira Council, which has replaced the New Yevon organization.

=== Nooj ===
Voiced by: Nobutoshi Canna (Japanese); George Newbern (English)
Motion capture: Jun Ishii

Nooj (ヌージ, Nūji) is the leader of the Youth League organization, which emerged in the wake of Sin's defeat and whose members advocate for radical reform of Spira's society. Its progressive attitude has attracted former Crusaders and younger inhabitants of Spira to its ranks. Nooj is also a former Crusader who lost his left arm and leg during a battle against Sin and replaced them with machina prosthetics. After an incident caused by Shuyin's spirit, Nooj was possessed by Shuyin, and shot his friends Paine, Gippal and Baralai, resulting in their split. After Shuyin leaves Nooj and possesses Baralai, Nooj joins Gippal in a quest to free Baralai. While stopping Shuyin, Nooj reunites with his old friends.

=== Chuami ===
Voiced by: Ayumi Takamune (Japanese); Eden Riegel (English)

Chuami (チュアミ) is the 17-year-old female protagonist and narrator of the audio drama Final Fantasy X -Will-. She is a member of the Spira Council and the assistant of her childhood friend Kurgum (クルグム, Kurugumu), but owing to her force of character and Kurgum's lack thereof, the de facto roles are actually the reverse. Baralai sends them from Bevelle to Besaid to meet with Yuna. As Chuami is headstrong and tactless, she constantly upsets people with her brutal honesty. She has a deep hatred for the Yevoners organization for its role in her mother's death at the hands of Yevoner hunters, as she sympathized with the group. When Yuna is reluctant to accompany her and Kurgum back to Bevelle, she spurs Yuna into action by mentioning Tidus' weakened state when they met. Based on stories from her mother, Chuami claims to be Auron's daughter, although Lulu says there are no physical similarities between the two and believes that Auron would have mentioned having children. Upon returning to Bevelle with Yuna and Wakka, they learn Sin has returned, possibly beckoned by someone's wish. While eavesdropping on a conversation between Tidus and Yuna, Kurgum says he is in love with Yuna, but Chuami does not understand what he truly means. The two part ways with Chuami and return to Besaid with Tidus while Kurgum stays with Yuna and Wakka in Bevelle. After Tidus realizes Yuna's true reason for breaking up with him, Chuami accompanies him and Lulu on a journey to reunite with Yuna's group.

=== Kurgum ===
Voiced by: Yutaro Honjo (Japanese); Lucien Dodge (English)

Kurgum (クルグム, Kurugumu) is Chuami's childhood friend, a member of the Spira Council, and the male protagonist of Final Fantasy X -Will-. He is a sender, a person authorized to send spirits to the Farplane in place of summoners, who once aspired to become a summoner himself before the Eternal Calm. He reveres Yuna and her legendary guardians and looks up to her. Unlike Chuami, Kurgum is more introverted but determined. On orders from Baralai, Kurgum and Chuami travel to Besaid to meet with Yuna. Upon returning to Bevelle with Yuna and Wakka, they find out Sin has returned. As he and Chuami eavesdrop on a conversation between Yuna and Tidus, Kurgum suddenly claims to be in love with Yuna. It is implied he is lying and has feelings for Chuami, but she does not understand, as Kurgum says it is something only summoners understand. They part ways, with Chuami returning to Besaid with Tidus while Kurgum stays in Bevelle with Wakka and Yuna as she resolves to fight Sin once more.

== Cultural impact ==
=== Merchandising ===
Near the release of the first game, Square released multiple types of merchandising featuring the cast of Final Fantasy X including plushes and action figures. A CD titled Final Fantasy X Vocal Collection contains monologues and character songs by the Japanese voice actors. Another CD is an extended play with themes by actors Masakazu Morita and Mayuko Aoki who do the characters of Tidus and Yuna, respectively. A three-CD album, Final Fantasy X-2 Vocal Collection, was also released featuring tracks by the actors behind Yuna, Rikku and Paine. A new action figures for Tidus was also released in commemoration of Final Fantasy's 20th anniversary alongside other protagonists from the franchise.

=== Critical response ===
Critical reception to the characters from Final Fantasy X and X-2 has been positive. The cast from X has been well received by IGN's David Smith for their characteristics which avoided clichés, commenting that supporting cast was "rock-solid". IGN also appreciated the variety of characters based on Spira's regions, favorably comparing it with the ones from Final Fantasy VII and IX. GameSpot writer Greg Kasavin found the game's cast entertaining and emphasized how different was Tidus from previous Final Fantasy heroes in terms of personality yet still was appealing. Eurogamer's Tom Bramwell noted how the character development from the main cast "converge to bind the group and the player on an emotional level" and stated that thanks to the animation, the game is "transformed into more of a movie than a game at times". Various characters have also stood out within the Final Fantasy franchise and games in general with Tidus and Yuna appearing in GameZone's list of the ten best Final Fantasy characters as well in a Famitsu poll of the best 100 video game characters with GameZone praising the two characters' attitudes. Additionally, Tidus and Yuna have been listed by several publications as one of the best couples in gaming. GameSpot cited the romance's progress across the game as one of its strongest elements, while GamesRadar referred to it as a realistic relation. The main cast of Final Fantasy X-2 was also praised with writers comparing the trio with the protagonists from Charlie's Angels.

Raymond Padilla from GameSpy also praised the game's visual which resulted in appealing character designs. The change of several designs in Final Fantasy X-2 resulted in mixed reactions with GameSpot criticizing "a dominantly lighthearted tone" in comparison to X's darker atmosphere, while IGN praised the clothing designs, combining "proven and recognizable Final Fantasy styles" with a "revealing neo-modern fashion sense". The voice casting was praised by Game Revolution who noted most of them were "above average". Bramwell was more critical owing to the lack lipsynching and unsuitable tones that made him wonder why could not the gamers listen to the original Japanese audio. Criticism to the English acting in Final Fantasy X was aimed towards James Arnold Taylor's and Hedy Burress's portrayal of Tidus and Yuna, respectively, in comparison to the original Japanese delivery which made the characters less interesting. The English release of Final Fantasy X-2 won the Seventh Annual Academy of Interactive Arts & Sciences award in 2004 for Outstanding Achievement in Character Performance in recognition of the character Rikku.
