= Blitzball =

Blitzball may refer to:

- Blitzball (Final Fantasy), a fictional sport in Final Fantasy X
- Blitzball (sport), a variation of baseball
