= Spira (Final Fantasy) =

Fictional world in Final Fantasy games

- Final Fantasy X location
- Tidus in the Zanarkand Ruins in Spira
- First appearance: Final Fantasy X (2001)
- Created by: Yoshinori Kitase, Motomu Toriyama
- Genre: Role-playing video game

In-universe information
- Type: World
- Characters: Tidus; Yuna; Rikku; Lulu; Seymour

Spira is the fictional world of the Square role-playing video games Final Fantasy X and X-2. Spira is the first Final Fantasy world to feature consistent, all-encompassing spiritual and mythological influences within the planet's civilizations and their inhabitants' daily lives. The world of Spira itself is different from the mainly European-style worlds found in previous Final Fantasy games, being much more closely modeled on a setting influenced by the South Pacific, Thailand, Bali and Japan, most notably with respect to its vegetation, topography and architecture.

The creation of Spira includes distinct ethnic minorities including a portrayal of the fictional Al Bhed language that is prevalent throughout the game's dialogue. The backstory and concept behind the dark religious themes of Final Fantasy X were a central theme to the story and their ultimate resolution was well received. The popularity of the Eternal Calm video served as the impetus of Square Enix to do Final Fantasy X-2 to make their first direct sequel in video game form and depict the evolution of Spiran society after religious and political upheaval results in new factions and instability in the world. Spira and its inhabiting characters have been featured in several other Square Enix works including Dissidia Final Fantasy and its prequel Dissidia 012, three games within the Kingdom Hearts series and Theatrhythm Final Fantasy.

There have been numerous academic essays on the game's presentation, narrative and localization aspects. Washburn writes that mastering the game comes with the mastering of the cultural knowledge of Spira to unlock skills and abilities. O'Hagan writes on the localization of the games that impact the game experience, detailing alterations to the script and dialogue with modifications, additions and omissions. Another aspect was that the presentation of Spira without an overworld view can be considered a pioneer in 3D role-playing game maps.

== Concept and creation ==
In speaking about the inspiration behind Spira, producer Yoshinori Kitase recounted that players had found fault with the science fiction atmosphere of Final Fantasy VII and VIII, instead desiring a "simple fantasy world". To Kitase, the word "fantasy" did not indicate a purely medieval European setting, so he intentionally set out with the objective of redefining the stereotype held in players' minds. Nomura identified the South Pacific, Thailand, and Japan as major influences on the cultural and geographic design of Spira, particularly in regard to the geographic locations of Besaid and Kilika. Yusuke Naora, the art director, noted that during the concept stage many people on the project were interested in Asian themes, including Kitase and writer Kazushige Nojima. The city of Samarkand in Uzbekistan has been cited as an inspiration for Zanarkand.

Nomura said that Spira deviates from the worlds of past Final Fantasy games most notably in the level of detail incorporated, something he has expressed to have made a conscious effort to maintain during the design process. Fumi Nakashima, the sub-character chief designer, concentrated on giving characters from different regions and cultures distinct styles of clothing. Nakashima wanted the machine-oriented society of the Al Bhed to stand out and had them wear masks and goggles to give them a strange and eccentric appearance.

Koji Sugimoto, main programmer for characters, said that the complexities of the PlayStation 2 hardware made mastering it difficult, but more rewarding because the details on Yuna's sleeves to the depiction of shine and shadow could be rendered more realistically. Final Fantasy X was the first game that allowed for 3-D model rendering of backgrounds that increased the presentation, including small details like grass blowing in the wind and cloud movement. Takayoshi Nakazato decided to abandon the typical world map concept for a more realistic depiction. Final Fantasy X's spatial presentation of Spira is tied to progression, with a player's progress being marked through the panoramic introduction and depiction of the area upon first entry. Sound editor Chiharu Minekawa commented that the transition in sound from one environment to the next was done seamlessly to mimic the natural surroundings of these environments as the player moved through them.

The decision to create Final Fantasy X-2 came after fan response to the "Eternal Calm" in the International Edition of Final Fantasy X which depicted events two years following Yuna's final battle. The dark religious theme of the first game was concluded and the cultural changes were explored as the people of Spira focus on fashion that "reflects their state of mind". Toriyama believes the most important element incorporated into X-2 was the "peaceful world of Spira achieved in X and unification of characters' state of mind". Kitase identified Final Fantasy X's theme as "independence from the ties of law and customs" and X-2's theme is about "the changes that occurred from the chaos after gaining that independence".

For Final Fantasy X-2 many pop culture references were used, including Charlie's Angels and with the transformation of the dress spheres being a reference to the magical girl genre of anime.

=== Remastering ===
Square Enix chose to update Final Fantasy X and X-2's graphics for a remastered release in high-definition. With a production cycle longer than two years, the graphics were not merely upscaled to higher resolutions and feature updated models and textures. Kitase commented that he wanted to excite new and returning players and added more depth to do so and opened up the possibility of further remasters based on reception. Many views could not simply be reframed to 16:9 because that would reveal characters waiting for their cues off-screen, so the remastering team performed a lot of redrawing and additions to the visuals.

== Setting ==
=== Geography ===
The main landmass of Spira is surrounded by small islands, including: Besaid, a tropical town serving as the origin of Yuna's pilgrimage; Kilika, a larger island featuring dense jungles and numerous conflicts during the games; and the desert island of Bikanel, which is also the location of the Al Bhed's headquarters — "Home". The ruins of Baaj Temple are on an island to the south of the Spira mainland; this is where Tidus begins his journey in Spira.

The mainland of Spira is where the bulk of Final Fantasy X takes place. The southernmost location of the mainland, Luca, is a large city home to Spira's pastime, Blitzball. North of Luca is the mountainous area of Djose, which features a Yevonite temple. Connecting Luca and Djose are several roads: the Mi'ihen Highroad, a historical path that features Chocobos for transportation; the Mushroom Rock Road, home of the failed operation to defeat Sin; and Djose Highroad, a rocky path that forks north into the Moonflow and east to Djose Temple.

The Moonflow is a large river running through the heart of Spira, featuring shoopuf rides, ancient ruins, and a high density of pyreflies. A path from the Moonflow leads to Guadosalam, home of the Guado race and the gateway to the "Farplane" (異界, ikai; lit. "other world"). North of Guadosalam are the Thunder Plains, which are the site of a never-ending thunderstorm made safe by lightning rods calibrated by the Al Bhed. The Thunder Plains lead into Macalania, a sparkling forest complemented by a frozen lake and a Yevonite temple.

Bevelle, the spiritual center of the Yevon religion, lies on a thin strip of land slightly north of Macalania. The city is built as a series of layers, with the headquarters of Yevon located at the top. The Via Purifico, located beneath Bevelle, serves as an oubliette for outcasts. Further north are the Calm Lands, a series of plains that have been the site of numerous battles in Spira's history; the Cavern of the Stolen Fayth, an equally historical area; and Mt. Gagazet, home of the Ronsos. Lastly, the sacred city of Zanarkand is on the northern tip of the Spiran mainland, reduced to ruins by Sin one thousand years before the events of FFX.

Final Fantasy X-2 features several changes to the locations of Spira. The Djose Temple, abandoned by a faltering Yevon after X, becomes the headquarters of the Machine Faction; likewise, the Youth League sets up their headquarters at the site of the failed operation on the Mushroom Rock Road. Bevelle remains the capital of the New Yevon faction, although the game introduces a large, technological area hidden beneath the city. Several new enterprises have been started, including a new pastime in Luca called Sphere Break; a group of entertainers at the Moonflow; a tourist service at the Zanarkand Ruins; and machina transportation in favor of Chocobos on the Mi'ihen Highroad. Lastly, the death of the Aeons at the end of X causes the Macalania forest and lake to melt, sinking the former Yevon temple and destroying the forest's life. X-2 also introduces floating ruins atop Mt. Gagazet and previously unexplored caverns throughout Spira.

=== Creatures and races ===
Although it is predominantly populated by humanoids, Spira features a variety of races. The people of Spira mainly reside in small towns and villages and cities like Bevelle and Luca. The Al Bhed is a unique ethnic group which plays an important role in the storyline and world of the games with distinctive green eyes with spiral-shaped pupils. The culture and conflicts of the Al Bhed permeate the games. The main character Rikku is Al Bhed, and Yuna is part Al Bhed on her mother's side and assistance in gaining through a cast of supporting Al Bhed characters, prevalent in Final Fantasy X-2. With the collapse of the teachings of Yevon and the wider acceptance of machina at the end of X, prejudice against the Al Bhed seems to have eased significantly by the time of X-2, though it is still present.

The Al Bhed speak their own "language" which is really just a substitution cipher of Japanese (English in the English localization of the game), a system of transposing certain letters for others; however, within the game world, it is intended to be an actual language. The original Japanese version of the cipher uses the syllable-based kana system of writing where each symbol represents a combination of "consonant + vowel" or simply a vowel. Certain keywords are not translated into Al Bhed in the game, to give the impression of use of loanwords compared to modern foreign languages. Most keywords are proper nouns, but some common nouns also are not translated, such as "fiend". Alexander Smith decided to "map common phonemes in English to common phonemes in Welsh" and gave preference to Welsh pronunciations, but had to work with new diphthongs to maintain consistency in the Al Bhed language.

Several other races are found throughout Spira, including the Guado, the Hypello, and the Ronso races. The Guado are an arboreal humanoid race with long limbs and fingers, pale skin, and wild, tangled hair. The Guado are the keepers of the entryway to the Farplane, where the dead are sent and have the unique ability to "smell the deceased" and other abilities related to pyreflies. The Ronso are a race of horned, blue-furred, lion-like humanoids who live on Mt. Gagazet, which they consider sacred and guard fiercely. Ronso are tall and formidable warriors with a strong sense of honor and loyalty. A subplot of FFX involves Kimahri Ronso's conflict with his social status that results in his leadership of the Ronso in X-2. The Hypello are a docile, amphibious race with blue skin and live primarily in and around the area of the Moonflow. Though extremely quick and agile swimmers, they are the only race in Spira that does not participate in Blitzball tournaments. The male Hypello are all voiced by John DeMita.

Spira also features various animal species and fictional species, such as the gigantic shoopuf and the chocobo that are used primarily for transport purposes. Most other unusual creatures encountered in Final Fantasy X are "fiends", monsters created from the restless dead by Pyreflies to devour the living. Aeons and the unsent are also forms created by pyreflies. Sin, the bringer of destruction, is a powerful fiend that is made of high-density pyreflies; it can control gravitation forces to replenish its strength and even fly. Sin's high concentration of pyreflies affect the pyreflies present in the bodies of those present, and is known as "Sin's toxin". Despite the Final Summoning being able to destroy Sin itself, the central core of Sin, which is an entity known as Yu Yevon, would survive. From this, Sin is "reborn" after a time.

=== Fictional history ===
Spira's history centers around an ancient war a thousand years prior to the start of the game between Bevelle and Zanarkand, the latter's ruler deeming his city's eventual demise and reserve to preserve its memory. Yevon's people became the fayth to create this manifestation and Yevon made himself the core of a powerful monster known as Sin to protect it, though the process destroyed his mind as he continuously maintains Sin's summoning as the creature is compelled to destroy. Through the machinations of Yevon's daughter Yunalesca, Bevelle established a religious faith built on atonement and sacrifice to conceal the spiral of death that runs throughout Spira's history. This process involves Yunalesca teaching a summoner a ritual known as "the Final Summoning", which would give Spira a brief reprieve from Sin's terror in a period known the "Calm" (ナギ節, Nagisetsu; lit. "calm time"). However, the Final Summoning is based on a strong bond, and requires a summoner to turn their guardian into the Fayth of a Final Aeon whose summoning kills the summoner who is memorialized as a high summoner. Though the Final Aeon can destroy Sin, it would become a new vessel of Yu Yevon and turned into a new Sin.

A thousand years following the establishment of the Yevon Order, Spira became a rustic land, almost completely devoid of large cities and higher civilization. Due to the actions of Sin, and the Yevon ban on machina, few territories reached larger than hamlet size, as they were destroyed by Sin and their populations decimated before they were able to develop. The only cities left larger than small villages were Luca, which houses the only blitzball stadium in Spira, and Bevelle, the center of the temples of Yevon. Yuna and her guardians break the cycle and bring about the "Eternal Calm".

As a result of the events in Final Fantasy X, in X-2 the teachings of Yevon were deemed invalid after the order's secrets were exposed while the Al Bhed accepted by the Spirans with association with machina no longer sacrilegious. Spirans in general had a positive outlook with the onset of the Eternal Calm. New political groups fought for power, two being the Youth League, the New Yevon Party, while Machine Faction seeks to salvage machina. Yuna ultimately restores peace and saves Spira a second time with multiple endings based on the player's performance.

=== Mythos ===
In the world of Final Fantasy X and its sequel, many supernatural elements influence events in the fictional world of Spira, defining the life of the planet's inhabitants. Magic, spiritual energy, and the power of memories are heavily intertwined, and their effects manifest in a number of situations, including sporting events, religious practices, technology, and even in some of the native wildlife of the planet. The most popular pastime is Blitzball. The depiction of Sin as an "existence that agonizes the world" and as a "disaster with form" plays an important role in Spira's everyday life throughout the game. In X-2, the population of Spira pursues additional leisures including attending concerts and a coin-collecting fad called Sphere Break.

In Spira, when a person dies suddenly and unexpectedly, their life force, manifested as pyreflies, must be released from the body and sent to the Farplane, the final resting place of departed souls. If the sending is not performed, the body's spirit may remain trapped in the physical plane and take on the form of a fiend. A spirit of the dead may resist the transformation into a fiend, even when not sent and remain among the living, they are "unsent". The unsent play a prominent role in the storyline and mythos, including the playable character Auron and other characters including Maester Jyscal Guado, Shuyin, and Lady Yunalesca.

==== Pyreflies ====
Pyreflies are a mysterious, naturally occurring phenomenon that heavily influence the events of Final Fantasy X and X-2, as well as the world of Spira at large. Heavily prevalent throughout Spira, these "bundles of life energy" are closely associated with death and other spiritual events and entities by the people of Spira. At high concentrations, Pyreflies are capable of recording memories, sights and sounds. Pyreflies are also associated with many commonplace technological innovations including sphere-shaped recording devices and large, suspended spherical conglomerations of congealed water called "sphere pools" that serve as the playing field for blitzball games. The pyreflies are also a source of raw energy to empower the giant machina, Vegnagun. Shinra of the Gullwings suggests that the life energy flowing through Spira on the Farplane could possibly be harnessed for the purpose of supplying electricity to a city. In interviews published in the Final Fantasy X Ultimania Ω and Final Fantasy X-2 Ultimania guidebooks, Kazushige Nojima and Yoshinori Kitase revealed that Final Fantasy VII and X-2 share a plot-related connection, in which the Shinra corporation in VII is founded on another planet after about one thousand years, after space travel became possible, by descendants of Shinra of the Gullwings in X-2. This connection was conceived only after Final Fantasy X was already finished and realized in X-2 riding on the success of the original game and is not reflected in the gameplay or storylines of Final Fantasy VII or X.

==== Religion ====
Religion is an important part of life for many of the peoples of Spira, with a large majority of the population describing themselves as "Yevonites". Though by the end of Final Fantasy X some people had begun to question them, nevertheless the teachings of Yevon were millennium-old and heavily influential. The Yevonite clergy taught that Sin was a divine punishment set upon the people for their pride in the use of machines. As a result, the temples forbade the use of modern technology, and promoted a culture of atonement for past sins in the hopes of appeasing Sin.

While the Yevon church forbids most machina including weapons, their capital Bevelle retains machina to ensure its dominance. The Al Bhed are seen as dangerous to the Yevon clergy because they use machina and pose a threat to the church's uncontested control of Spira. The church retains its power by role in using the Final Summoning which results in the sacrifice of the summoner and her guardian to prevent its secrets from being divulged. Though Yevon set up Operation Mi'ihen to instill further loyalty to the teachings by making the Crusaders use machina that would never win against Sin. By the end of FFX, the Yevon religion was effectively disbanded once evidence of its corruption was discovered, and its remaining priests volunteered the truth. Half a year later, the moral teachings of Yevon were revitalized in the form of the New Yevon Party, later led in Final Fantasy X-2 by Praetor Baralai. Although technically a splinter group of Yevon, the New Yevon party was not a religion, but a simple philosophy, their motto and position on Spira's advancement being "One thing at a time".

In Final Fantasy X the "Hymn of the Fayth" (祈りの歌, Inori no Uta; lit. 'song of prayer') is an important song. Its fictional history started as a song of defiance turned scripture and has numerous variations that is played throughout the game throughout Yuna's journey, primarily as the music of the temples. Though the Hymn's words apparently have no discernible meaning within the context of Spira, the lyricist and scenario writer, Kazushige Nojima, composed a small puzzle with the lyrics, using Japanese syllables. When properly deciphered, they form sentences that translates thus: Pray to Yu Yevon. Dream, fayth. Forever and ever, grant us prosperity. The hymn was composed and arranged by Nobuo Uematsu and Masashi Hamauzu.

Final Fantasy X's negative depiction of organized religion has been compared to the Catholic Church and the corruptibility of organized religion in general with the ultimate battle against a god. Stark writes that the game is a thesis on religion and the final battle with Yu Yevon offers a discourse on how to defeat it, by "let[ting] it die a slow death, murder it with sheer force, or utilize one's knowledge of the (game) world to give it no power to stand on". The Game Theorists add additional concepts, going further as to cite Final Fantasy as "anti-religion".

==== Aeons and fayth ====
The fayth (祈り子, inorigo; lit. "prayer child") are humans who willingly give up their lives to have their souls sealed in statues and commune with summoners with whom they have established a mental link. This link grants a summoner access to a fayth's dreams and enables him or her to physically realize those dreams as aeons (召喚獣, shōkanjū; lit. "summon beast"), powerful creatures which may be employed to aid the summoner in battle or in a time of special need. During the events of Final Fantasy X, the fayth of the aeon Bahamut serves as the chosen representative of the fayth as a collective. The fayth aids High Summoner Yuna and her guardians in bringing the spiral of death to an end, which results in their own passing. In X-2, the fayth return in their aeon forms, this time having been overcome by the despair and malice of Shuyin, rendering them his unwilling puppets of chaos. Yuna and her allies free both the fayth and Shuyin from the darkness that has consumed them. Ten aeons are identified in Final Fantasy X: Valefor, Ifrit, Shiva, Ixion, Bahamut, Anima, Yojimbo and the three Magus Sisters. The game builds on mythological figures through the inclusion of the aeons, such as the Arabic Ifrit, the Hindu deity Shiva and even the Jungian figure Anima and the demon Valefor. Wilder wrote on the Jungian analysis of Anima and tied Square Enix's depiction of the Aeon as both a representation of Seymour's corruption. Wilder analyzes the chained and blinded depiction of the figure that is Seymour's mother and tying the form to her bound to servitude to Seymour in his descent into madness.

==== Militant factions ====
The Crusaders (formerly known as the "Crimson Blades") were a loosely-knit army that existed to protect towns and temples from Sin. The group was founded by Lord Mi'ihen, who made a journey to Bevelle 800 years ago to calm the maesters' fears that he was assembling an army to conquer them. Mi'ihen managed to win their trust, and the Crimson Blades were thereafter inducted into the Yevon clergy as the Crusaders. The road Mi'ihen had walked was renamed the "Mi'ihen Highroad" in his honor. Unlike guardians, Crusaders are directly related to the temples. No non-Yevonite is permitted to serve as a Crusader, although there are unofficial chapters composed entirely of people who have been excommunicated. All of the Crusaders were excommunicated, however, when they set up Operation Mi'ihen, a joint Crusader-Al Bhed attempt to destroy Sin with a giant machina weapon. The operation failed and the Crusaders were largely eradicated in the process. A group known as the Crimson Squad was also formed around Operation Mi'ihen. Three candidates survived the final exercise; Baralai, Nooj and Gippal, all of whom would eventually lead one of the three political factions during the events of Final Fantasy X-2.

== Appearances ==
Spira is the world of Final Fantasy X and X-2, but elements of its world and characters have been included in other Final Fantasy media. For Dissidia Final Fantasy and its prequel Dissidia 012 the characters Tidus, Yuna, Jecht and an area known as The Dream's End (夢の終わり, Yume no Owari) were featured. The Dreams' End shares similarities to the final area of Final Fantasy X complete with a large replica of Jecht's sword in the center. Tidus and Wakka are supporting characters in Kingdom Hearts and its follow-ups Chain of Memories and Coded. Auron makes an appearance in Kingdom Hearts II as a supporting team member and Final Fantasy X-2's main cast of Yuna, Rikku and Paine appear also make an appearance as supporting characters. Tidus, Auron and Yuna are also playable characters in Theatrhythm Final Fantasy.

== Analysis ==
In Imagined History, Fading Memory: Mastering Narrative in Final Fantasy X, Washburn writes that Final Fantasy X "makes the relationship of memory, history, and the struggle for control of knowledge a central element of both its gameplay and its narrative". Washburn gives a synopsis of the game's alternate history and describes Spira's development as "evok[ing] a number of culturally vital discourses in Japan that the designers of the game drew on: the modernist aesthetics of evanescence, the loss of faith and belief in a society where technology and religion clash, the desire for a dream realm of memories as the source of an alternative history, and the nostalgic desire for the sublime experience of the annihilation of the past and the completion of history". Washburn uses FFX and the analysis of its narrative to make the case for academic study of the medium and counter the critical views held by detractors like Espen Aarseth, summarizing that "the ability to complete the game requires mastering not only the instrumental controls needed to acquire and perfect game skills but also the narrative itself, the cultural knowledge of Spira that facilitates the acquisition of skills and abilities". In Languages Of Navigation Within Computer Games Flynn asserts that Final Fantasy X's navigation is a representative and symbolic language, writing that "[a]lthough FFX establishes itself through the opening cut scene as narrative based, it becomes clear that a poetic and mythic experience of space rather than a cinematic sense of space is in operation".

The localization process of Final Fantasy X and X-2 was analyzed as a case study by Mangiron and O'Hagan to highlight the liberties of localization. Technical limitations include localizing over a thousand weapons with unique names that must be conveyed in 15 characters yet have no English equivalent as in the case of 花鳥風月 (kachōfūgetsu, Meaning "Beauties of nature" Literally: "flower, bird, wind, and moon") that became "Painkiller" in English. Other cases include the addition of accents as in the case of Final Fantasy X-2's O'aka, a merchant, who speaks Cockney despite no accent being present in Japanese. Also included were references to Lollapalooza and humorous references to speech, with Rikku's verb conjugation of a noun having been modified for English audiences. Other differences like Sano's name being changed to Ormi for the English version, with Mangiron and O'Hagan noting a possible issue with the Spanish meaning of "Sano" as "healthy" in stark contradiction to Ormi's obese appearance. Mangiron and O'Hagan conclude that these changes and contextualisation by addition result in transcreation instead of just translation. Using the games as a case study, Mangiron and O'Hagan highlight that the freedom to modify, omit or add content results in the traditional concept of fidelity being discarded to maintain the "game experience".

In the Marie Curie Euroconference on the Challenges of Multidimensional Translation, Minako O'Hagan expanded on the localization issue including the extreme rewrite of Final Fantasy X-2's theme song 1000 words and the International Edition, saying that in-game dialogues were produced fresh to match the dubbed American version, instead of using the original Japanese script. O'Hagan noted a point of contention raised by fans were Yuna's final words to Tidus in Final Fantasy X as "Thank you" (Arigato) being translated in English as "I love you"; this translation would extend to the European release and the voice dialogue would be in English. Other academic publications refer to the localization process of Final Fantasy X including Hevian and Marco.

Final Fantasy X's depiction of Spira set a new standard with the traversing of real-time 3D environments instead of an overworld map, making the portrayal of Spira a pioneer in 3-D RPG maps.
