= Rikku =

Fictional character in the Final Fantasy series

- Final Fantasy character
- Rikku, as she appears in Final Fantasy X.
- First game: Final Fantasy X (2001)
- Created by: Tetsuya Nomura
- Voiced by: EN: Tara Strong; JA: Marika Matsumoto
- Motion capture: Miyuki Shimizu (FFX); Natsuho Matsuda (FFX-2)

In-universe information
- Race: Al Bhed
- Weapon: Claws (FFX); Daggers (FFX-2)
- Home: Bikanel Island

Rikku is a character in the Final Fantasy series, created by Tetsuya Nomura. Rikku first appears in Final Fantasy X as one of its protagonists, where she accompanies her cousin Yuna and others on a journey to defeat the monster Sin. Rikku again appears as a protagonist in the game's direct sequel, Final Fantasy X-2. In that game, she, Yuna, and new friend Paine journey to find missing FFX protagonist Tidus.

Square originally planned to make Rikku the protagonist of her own game, but the developer cancelled the idea. In order to make a game revolving around a group of female heroes, Final Fantasy X-2's protagonists became Yuna, Paine, and Rikku. To reflect the changing social mores between game titles, Rikku wears much more casual and minimal clothing in X-2 than the games' predecessor.

Rikku generally received a positive reception, with her X-2 design receiving praise for its attractiveness. Some critics have considered her attire to be fan service, and her character development thin. Most fans, however, have expressed positive views of her cheerful and bubbly personality. The character has appeared on many lists of fans' favorite Final Fantasy characters.

== Concept and creation ==
Rikku first appeared in Final Fantasy X. Tetsuya Nomura designed her as a 15-year-old Al Bhed girl. She is Cid's daughter and Brother's younger sister. After the game's release, the video game press reported that she might get her own game, code-named "Rikku Version"; however, it was later confirmed to not be in the works. Rikku, along with Yuna, were the leads of Final Fantasy X-2 and were the only characters from Final Fantasy X to appear. Developers chose her in order to create a game that centered on women. Tetsu Tsukamoto, the designer of Final Fantasy X-2's "alternate" costumes, explained that Rikku's outfit was the product of a cultural change in Spira, the world Rikku inhabits. The staff also wished to make that cast seem more physically active.

Rikku is voiced by Tara Strong in English and by Marika Matsumoto in Japanese. Strong was offered an audition by Final Fantasy X casting director Jack Fletcher. Before her audition, Fletcher gave Strong recordings of the Japanese version of Rikku and a description of the character. Many of Strong's lines ended with "you know" in order to match the English dub with the character's mouth movements, particularly to end the sentence with a vowel sound. They decided to make this a vocal tic for her.

== Appearances ==
Rikku first appears in Final Fantasy X as one of its protagonists. She helps Tidus when he first arrives as a stranger in Spira, but then she disappears during an attack from the monster Sin. Upon meeting Tidus again at the Moonflow, she becomes the last character to join her cousin Yuna's entourage of guardians. Rikku's attitude is somewhat childish but is mostly quite cheerful and positive. She does occasionally suffer from instances of anxiety. This feeling originates from being attacked by a fiend on a beach when she was young; her brother then tried to destroy it with a Thunder spell, but he missed and electrocuted her instead. Cid's sister married Braska, which makes Braska Rikku's uncle. This relationship also makes Rikku Yuna's cousin. Rikku wishes to prevent Yuna from going through with her summoner pilgrimage as she will die in the process of defeating Sin. Rikku returns in Final Fantasy X-2 once again as a protagonist, now 17 years old. She is also the one who convinces Yuna to leave the land of Besaid and go on a journey along with their new friend Paine. Rikku convinces Yuna by showing her a mysterious sphere featuring a person resembling Yuna's lost love, Tidus.

Rikku appears in the game Theatrhythm Final Fantasy: Curtain Call as a playable character. Her appearance resembles a chibi-esque version of her Final Fantasy X-2 character. She also appears alongside Yuna and Paine in Kingdom Hearts II as a miniature fairy version of herself wearing modified versions of her X-2 attire. The game Itadaki Street Special features a miniature Rikku also in her X-2 outfit, along with Yuna and Paine. Rikku also appears as a character in the game World of Final Fantasy.

=== Merchandise ===
Rikku, along with characters Paine and Yuna, received a series of singles performed by Marika Matsumoto in a collection called "Final Fantasy X-2 Vocal Collection - Rikku". The three characters also had figurines produced by Play Arts. They were the first figurines Play Arts produced in-house.

== Reception ==
Rikku, as she appears in Final Fantasy X-2. Her design change was the subject of discussion for her designers and critics.

Rikku has received generally positive reception since appearing in Final Fantasy X and X-2. Final Fantasy fans voted her the 13th best female Final Fantasy character. Famitsu readers ranked her as one of the best video game characters. She has been identified as one of the most attractive female characters in and outside of the series by IGN, Play, UGO, and G4TV readers. Complex identified her outfit as the main reason to play Final Fantasy X-2. Houston Press expressed disappointment that the story of Final Fantasy X focused so much on Tidus, noting how much more interesting the relationship between Rikku and Yuna was. Game Informer identified her as a character they would like to be around due to an abundance of positive energy. Digitally Downloaded enjoyed her character as well, noting she was their ideal rogue and praised her for her uplifting attitude. They also found her a highlight of Final Fantasy X and hoped to see her in Dissidia Final Fantasy.

Game Informer was critical of the sexualization of Rikku, noting her as being underage. Digitally Downloaded noted that her outfit in Final Fantasy X-2 was fan service. They also noted, however, that it was story-related as it demonstrated the liberation of her society from restrictive rules between games. Despite enjoying her "bubbly personality" in the face of hardships, they felt that there was not much depth to her character, and that people were too focused on her outfit. CNET felt Rikku was a highly underrated character, though noting that she was mostly known for her outfit and "being scared" than her engineering prowess.

Tara Strong was awarded "Outstanding Achievement in Character Performance — Female" for her portrayal of Rikku by the Academy of Interactive Arts & Sciences. Game Informer identified Rikku as one of Strong's most notable roles.
