= Tidus =

Final Fantasy character

- Final Fantasy character
- Artwork by Tetsuya Nomura of Tidus and his sword, Brotherhood
- First game: Final Fantasy X (2001)
- Created by: Kazushige Nojima
- Designed by: Tetsuya Nomura
- Voiced by: English: James Arnold Taylor (Final Fantasy series); Shaun Fleming (Kingdom Hearts series); Japanese: Masakazu Morita; Yūto Nakamura (young)
- Motion capture: Masakazu Morita
- Portrayed by: Kikunosuke Onoe V (kabuki), Hideaki Takizawa (commercial)

In-universe information
- Weapon: Longsword
- Home: Zanarkand

Tidus (Japanese: ティーダ, Hepburn: Tīda) is a character in Square Enix's video game series Final Fantasy and the main protagonist of the 2001 role-playing video game Final Fantasy X. An athlete from the city of Zanarkand, he is transported to Spira after the monster Sin destroys it. Shortly after arriving there, Tidus meets the summoner Yuna and her guardians and joins them on a pilgrimage to kill Sin after learning that it is his transformed missing father, Jecht. Tidus has appeared in other video games, including the Final Fantasy X sequel X-2, where he can be recruited as a playable character in the international version. He also appears in various Square Enix crossover games and in the Kingdom Hearts series, where he is depicted as a child.

Tetsuya Nomura designed Tidus with a cheerful personality and appearance to contrast with previous Final Fantasy protagonists. Scenario writer Kazushige Nojima wanted to expand the relationship between player and character with monologues describing the game's setting. The narrative was initially focused on the romance between Tidus and Yuna, but Square Enix instead decided to focus on Tidus' relationship with Jecht to have a greater impact on the setting. Tidus is voiced in Japanese by Masakazu Morita, who also performed his motion capture, and in English by James Arnold Taylor; both actors enjoyed voicing the character.

Tidus has been generally well-received by video-game critics. His cheerful personality and heroism make him an appealing protagonist, contrasting with previous male characters in the franchise and being comparable to messiah figures and other fictional heroes. Tidus' character development and romantic relationship with Yuna are considered among the best in video games, although reviewers and fans were divided on Taylor's voice acting. Tidus has been popular with fans, often ranking in polls as one of the best Final Fantasy characters. Action figures and jewelry related to Tidus have been produced, and he is a popular character among cosplayers.

== Creation and development ==
Before the development of Final Fantasy X, game-scenario writer Kazushige Nojima was concerned about the relationship between the player and the main character in a Final Fantasy title, and wanted to make the story easier to follow. Because the player and the main character find themselves in a new world, Nojima wanted Tidus' understanding of that world to track the player's progress in the game. Nojima felt that Tidus was the easiest character to draw in the first half of Final Fantasy X, because the player and characters learn about the story together. Nojima created a brief description of Tidus for character designer Tetsuya Nomura, from which Nomura created a sketch for input from Nojima and other staff members. Nomura was asked to design Tidus differently from the game's theme so he would stand out. Movie director Hiroshi Kuwabara noted the difficulty of making Tidus and the other main characters realistic. The staff wanted to introduce an undead playable character, but after Nojima saw a film with a similar idea for its protagonist during the game's development, the role of an undead person was then given to secondary character Auron. Director Yoshinori Kitase stated that during the development of Final Fantasy X, one developer focused on the romance between Tidus and Yuna.

Nomura stated that the contrast between Tidus and Yuna was established by their names, which are derived from the Okinawan words for "sun" and "night", respectively. This contrast is also shown in the items that power their celestial weapons; the sun sigil and crest for Tidus, and the moon sigil and crest for Yuna. Because the player can change Tidus' name, his name is not spoken in the game. However, a character in Dream Zanarkand uses Tidus' name in a dialogue box, and it appears in Spiran script on the nameplate of an Auroch locker in the Luca stadium. Before Final Fantasy X's release, Tidus was known to the media as Tida. In early 2001, PlayOnline changed the character's name to "Tidus". Because Tidus' name is never spoken in FFX, its intended pronunciation has been debated. Interviews with James Arnold Taylor and spoken dialogue in the English versions of Dissidia Final Fantasy, Dissidia 012 Final Fantasy, and Kingdom Hearts, in which Tidus makes cameo appearances, indicate his name is pronounced /ˈtiːdəs/ (TEE-dəs); in the English version of Kingdom Hearts II, Tidus' name is pronounced /ˈtaɪdəs/ (TY-dəs). According to Taylor, the name was pronounced TEE-dəs during the localization of FFX because the narrator of an early English trailer pronounced it that way.

Nojima said that he cried during the game's ending, when Tidus and Yuna are separated and he vanishes. For the sequel, Final Fantasy X-2, producer Kitase thought that the greatest fan expectation was the reunion of Tidus and Yuna after their separation in the first game. The game generated rumors about Tidus' connection with the villain Shuyin, who was physically similar to him and had the same voice actors. However, according to Square Enix, given Tidus' nature, such a storyline would be too complicated. For the remastering of Final Fantasy X and X-2, producer Kitase's motivation was to have people too young to have played the games experience them; his son was only old enough to know Tidus and Yuna from Dissidia Final Fantasy and its prequel.

=== Design ===
Character designer Nomura said that he wanted Tidus' clothing and accessories to suggest a relationship with the sea. Tidus' clothing has a distinctive blue motif; his blitzball team logo, which is based on a fish hook, is an amalgam of the letters J and T, the first letters of his name and that of his father Jecht. Additionally, he and Yuna share the key color blue, suggesting a maritime link.

Tidus was designed to be distinctive within Spira. Because of improvements in technology following the previous Final Fantasy games, Nomura wanted to make Tidus' face more realistic and his build more noticeable compared to previous Final Fantasy characters, who looked scrawny. Square Enix wanted Tidus to have an Asian look. Artist Yusuke Naora worked on Tidus' design and his relationship with the sea, which he found difficult to draw and translate into computer-generated imagery CGI. In commercials of the game, Tidus was portrayed by Hideaki Takizawa.

Because they were unaccustomed to animating romantic scenes, the developers struggled with a scene in which Tidus and Yuna kiss. According to Visual Works director Kazuyuki Ikumori, this was due to the use of 3D models. The scene was revised several times due to a negative response from female staff members. Tidus was initially a rude plumber who was part of a delinquent gang; according to Kitase, Tidus would be a weak protagonist, and he was instead depicted as an athlete.

=== Personality ===
After designing serious, moody main characters for Final Fantasy VII and VIII, Nomura wanted to give Tidus a cheerful persona and appearance. Because he wanted to continue the recent trend of sky-related names, Kazushige Nojima chose a name based on tiida, which is Okinawan for "sun". Nojima called Tidus' personality "lively", and compared him to Final Fantasy VIII's other cheerful characters, Laguna Loire and Zell Dincht.

Though Tidus is initially portrayed as ignorant of Spira, his growth during the story was written to make his character arc more notable, especially because he saves the world at the end of the game. The scene in which Tidus saves Yuna from being kidnapped by Al Bhed and proclaims that he and the Guardians will protect them so they should not be concerned is one of their most important scenes. While Nojima wrote the character, the scenes in which Tidus' and Yuna's relationship becomes intimate was written by Daisuke Watanabe because Nojima struggled to write them in a proper romantic relationship. Nojima believes that the scene was well executed and that the couple's comfort helped Yuna complete her character arc.

Tidus' relationship with his father was based on stories such as ancient Greek legends and reveals the key to the weakness of Sin, the game's main antagonist. Kitase noted that in contrast to previous orphan characters in the franchise, Tidus' character arc includes accepting Jecht's wish for redemption for his abuse of him as a child. Kitase felt that Tidus' voice acting and facial expressions were crucial to him at this stage. Motomu Toriyama said that when Final Fantasy X was released, he saw the story from Tidus' point of view: "about parent, child and family". Although FFX was originally centered on the relationship between Tidus and Yuna, the addition of Jecht and his feud with Tidus was added late in the game's development to shift the focus to father and son making a bigger impact in Spira's history rather than the romantic couple. Kitase found the story of the relationship between Tidus and Jecht to be more moving than that between him and Yuna.

=== Portrayals ===
Voice actor Masakazu Morita, who voiced Tidus in Japanese, called him a highlight of his career, comparable to his voicing of Ichigo Kurosaki, protagonist of manga Bleach. Morita also enjoyed performing Tidus' motion capture, which gave him a greater understanding of the character's personality; he moved his body when he recorded Tidus' dialogue. Morita said that Tidus was his favorite character and called him "the most outstanding, most special character to me". As his first work as an actor, he has fond memories of voicing Tidus and interacting with other Final Fantasy X staff members.

Morita said that there was no difficulty in voicing Tidus, whose personality was similar to his own, and he did not need to study him. Morita was concerned that his career would be affected if fans did not enjoy Tidus. When announcing the Japanese actor, Square Enix said that Morita was chosen because he also did the motion capture for Zell, which would make fans remember previous games. In flashback scenes depicting a seven-year-old Tidus, he is voiced by Yūto Nakamura.

Morita returned to voice Tidus for the fighting game Dissidia Final Fantasy; he was concerned about his ability to perform the character's lines like the original Final Fantasy series because nearly a decade had passed since he voiced Tidus. By that time, Morita was more accustomed to acting as Ichigo as well as Keiji Maeda from Capcom's games Sengoku Basara, characters who have a different vocal tone than Tidus. When Morita returned to voice Tidus, he tried to make his voice match his original performance. When the game's director complimented Morita for keeping the character's tone, Morita was relieved and joked that he felt younger.

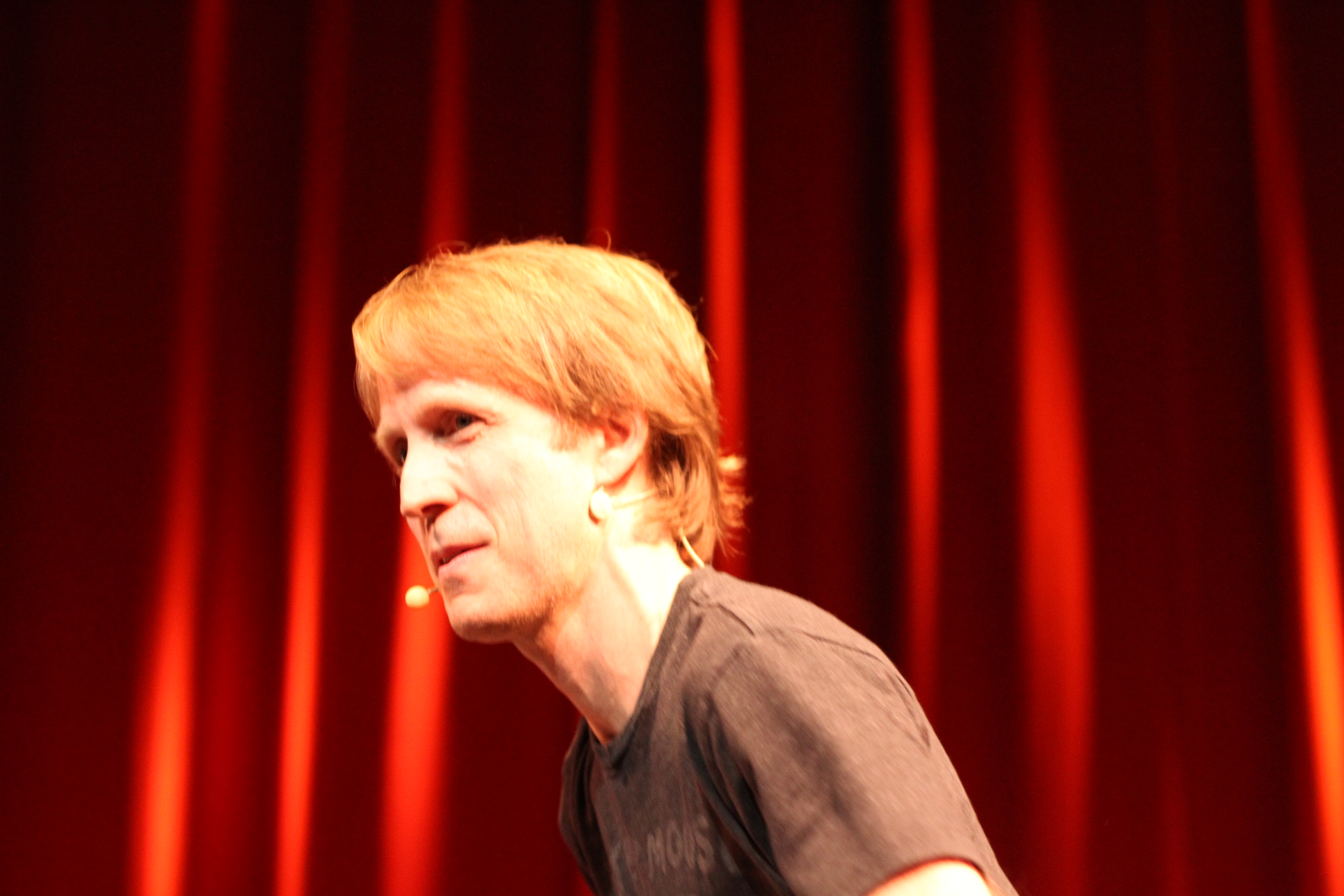
Tidus' English voice actor, James Arnold Taylor, gave the character a friendlier characterization than his Japanese counterpart Masakazu Morita.

In English, Tidus is voiced by James Arnold Taylor. Taylor was offered the role by voice director Jack Fletcher, who believed that Taylor would fit the character, and translator Alexander O. Smith explained Tidus to him. In contrast to Morita, with the staff's approval, Taylor made the character friendlier and less serious. After recording for Final Fantasy X, Taylor said that he would enjoy voicing Tidus again; he said the character is "like an old friend to me now. I know so much more about him now than I did when we first started, knowing hardly anything about him. I would really hate it if anybody else voiced him." Taylor enjoyed recording for the game, which took him three-and-a-half months.

According to Taylor, it would be unrealistic for Tidus to hide emotion. He said that, although there were things he would change about his performance, such as the scene in which Tidus and Yuna begin laughing together, he was grateful for the warm fan reception of his work. Smith felt the forced-laugh scene was adapted well from the original Japanese scene because of how "stilted and out of place" it is in the original version. Smith was confused by Morita's and Mayuko Aoki's performances but, after discussing it with Nojima, found that it well done in both languages, calling it "awkward" and "funny". When Final Fantasy X was re-released in 2013, Taylor said that he was proud to be Tidus' voice. For Dissidia NT, Taylor commented that, while Tidus' new role would seem new to players due to how he is again led into battle, people would still find him appealing. IGN said that the character "has a tendency to speak a little too high and fast when he gets excited". This led to several negative responses. In one scene, Yuna tells Tidus to laugh and Tidus forces a laugh. Although fans criticized the laughter as too forced, Taylor stated that it is an intentionally "awkward, goofy, dumb laugh".

Kikunosuke Onoe V portrayed Tidus in the 2023 kabuki adaptation of Final Fantasy X, including his child self. To promote the play, Morita appeared in commercials, asking fans to go see it. Morita expressed his excitement at the retelling of Final Fantasy X and that Onoe would portray his character as a result of his popularity.

== Appearances ==
=== Final Fantasy X series ===
In Final Fantasy X, Tidus is a player in the underwater sport of blitzball in an advanced, technological version of Zanarkand. Belying his cheerful, carefree attitude, Tidus hates his absent father Jecht—initially because of his mother's neglect and disappearance. During a blitzball tournament, Zanarkand is destroyed by Sin, who transports Tidus and Jecht's friend Auron to Spira. After his arrival on Spira, Tidus drifts to the island of Besaid and joins various guardians on a journey to help Yuna defeat Sin, who is revealed to be Jecht; Ten years before the story starts, Jecht and Auron made the same pilgrimage to protect the summoner Braska, Yuna's father, and defeated Sin, who Jecht was reborn as. As the journey continues, Tidus loses hope of returning home, begins a romantic relationship with Yuna, and vows not to let her die after the guardians tell him that Sin's battle will kill her.

When the party approaches Zanarkand, Tidus learns that he and Zanarkand are the dreams of dead people known as fayth. "Dream" Zanarkand was created when Sin was born during a war between Zanarkand and Bevelle and the original Zanarkand was destroyed. If Sin is permanently defeated, the summoning of Dream Zanarkand and its people, including Tidus, will cease. In the real Zanarkand, the group decides to find a way to destroy Sin that does not require the sacrifice of a guardian or a summoner which causes Tidus to reject the status quo and instead challenge Yunalesca. Following Yunalesca's defeat, the team learns that the late Yu Yevon is inside Sin. The team enters its shell and finding Jecht, whom they must defeat to eliminate Sin, and Tidus makes peace with his father in the aftermath. After defeating the spirit of Yu Yevon, who is responsible for Sin's rebirth, the fayth leave and the summoning of the copy of Zanarkand ends. As he vanishes, Tidus says farewell to his friends and joins the spirits of Auron, Jecht, and Braska in the afterlife.

Tidus also appears in the 2003 sequel Final Fantasy X-2, set two years after the events of FFX. After Yuna sees a sphere with a young man resembling Tidus imprisoned inside, she joins the Gullwings, a sphere-hunting group, and travels across Spira in hopes of finding clues that indicate Tidus is alive. The individual in the sphere is later revealed to be Shuyin. Depending on the player's development during the game, the fayth will appear to Yuna at the ending and tell her that they can make Tidus return to her. He then appears in Spira, and he and Yuna are reunited. In another final scene, Tidus is unsure whether he is still a dream and wants to remain with Yuna. He is also an unlockable character as blitzball player "Star Player". In Final Fantasy X-2: International + Last Mission, the game's updated version, Tidus is a recruitable playable character and an extra episode, set after the original game, reveals that he is living with Yuna in Besaid. An illusion of Tidus also appears as a boss.

Tidus' dialogue, monologues, and songs were included on the compact discs (CDs) Final Fantasy X Vocal Collection and feel/Go dream: Yuna & Tidus. Although he does not fully understand he is not the fayth's dream, Tidus feels that disappearing would be preferable to making Yuna cry again. The novel Final Fantasy X-2.5 ~Eien no Daishou~, which is set after Final Fantasy X-2, explores Tidus' and Yuna's visit to Besaid Island 1,000 years before. The HD remastered version of Final Fantasy X and X-2, Final Fantasy X/X-2 HD Remaster, adds audio drama Final Fantasy X: Will, in which Tidus is a new blitzball star who appears to be concealing an injury. After Yuna breaks up with him, Tidus helps her on a quest to defeat a reborn Sin.

=== Other appearances ===
Tidus has appeared in games other than Final Fantasy X, including other Final Fantasy games, the Kingdom Hearts series, and in Itadaki Street Special along with Auron and Yuna. In Kingdom Hearts (2002), younger versions of Tidus, Wakka, and Final Fantasy VIII's Selphie Tilmitt appear as inhabitants of Destiny Islands and optional sparring opponents. Tidus makes a cameo appearance in Kingdom Hearts: Chain of Memories (2004), while a digital replica of him appears as a boss in Kingdom Hearts Coded (2008).

In Dissidia Final Fantasy, Tidus is the hero from Final Fantasy X: a warrior from the goddess Cosmos, whose father works for the rival god Chaos. Tidus has two uniforms in the game, and his thoughts and actions relate to FFX. With the cast, he also appears in the prequel Dissidia 012 and represents Chaos in the previous war. Yuna confronts Tidus, who offers his life to save her from an attack by the villain Emperor, but Jecht saves Tidus, who becomes a warrior of Cosmos. Tidus appears in the third entry in the series, Dissidia NT.

Tidus is a playable character in the rhythm game Theatrhythm Final Fantasy. He also appears in World of Final Fantasy and Fortune Street: Dragon Quest & Final Fantasy 30th Anniversary. Tidus' disappearance between Final Fantasy X and its sequel is explained in the game Mobius Final Fantasy. Trapped in the underworld-like Palamecia, Tidus joins forces with the warrior Wol on a quest to become a Warrior of Light. After seeing one of Yuna's creatures disappear from Palamecia, Tidus decides to find a way to return to Spira, which he succeeds in after finding a crystal that allows him to teleport back to the world. His latest appearance is in the cellphone game Final Fantasy Explorers-Force.

== Reception ==
=== Critical response ===
Video-game publications gave Tidus had a positive reception. Several critics praised Tidus for his cheerful personality, contrasting with previous brooding protagonists. According to GameSpot reviewer Greg Kasavin, players may not initially like him, but would eventually find him "suitably endearing". Kasavin wrote that Tidus has "surprising depth" characteristic of past Final Fantasy protagonists. Complex described him as the second-best Final Fantasy character, surpassed only by Cloud, and praised his personality. Gail Hawisher and Cynthia Selfe, in their book Gaming Lives in the Twenty-First Century, said that Tidus' characterization in the original Japanese release of Final Fantasy X differs from that in its English dub, which fails to emulate the original Tidus. RPGFan said that Tidus' hobby, blitzball, is well integrated into the narrative because he and Wakka become close friends due to sharing the same passion, with Wakka acting like a mentor to Tidus when he believes that they should not focus on sports given the situation, but he tells him that Spira's citizens are fascinated by the idea of such a sport. In retrospect, Jean-Karlo Lemus from Anime News Network said that while Tidus was a notable victim of child abuse with focus on his alcoholic father in flashbacks, multiple Western players heavily criticized the resulting angst even calling it feminine traits even if Tidus' character arc allows him to overcome it during his journey with Yuna. Tidus' gradual care for his father was appreciated by Kotaku as writer AJ Glasser considered Jecht as one of the worst parents in gaming.

Tidus was compared with other kind heroes in the franchise, including Zidane Tribal from Final Fantasy IX and Vaan from Final Fantasy XII, because they appear to be less prominent in the main narrative than other featured characters. Christian Nutt of GamesRadar+ wrote that despite initial issues, Tidus' character development during the game makes him more likable. Atlus character designer Kazuma Kaneko called Tidus "a dashing lead character". The revelation of his true nature as a creation of the Fayth and his apparent death confused critics and gave a sad impression. Regarding his design, 1UP called Tidus the worst-dressed video-game character, while in the book Console Video Games and Global Corporations, Mia Consalvo stated that although Tidus was designed from a Western's perspective, contrasting the Eastern designs of the other characters, the game blends their looks and appeal to the audience. Meanwhile, his sword Brotherhood was praised by Polygon for its design, positively comparing to the Buster Sword from Final Fantasy VII due to its easily recognizable design and how the colors evoke the idea of water.

GameSpot described the relationship between Tidus and Yuna as one of the video-game "great loves", and it is often cited as one of the best romances in gaming. According to The Inquirer, Tidus and Yuna are a memorable video-game couple, noting Tidus' self-sacrifice and the couple's farewell. Their kiss also gathered attention. Yuna's English voice actor Hedy Burress said that Tidus' interactions with Yuna give her a humanized, "womanly aspect". Ash Parrish from Kotaku said that the scene in which Tidus and Yuna kiss in a forest underwater was one of the "first sex scenes" in his life due to its erotic atmosphere, which contrasted with the relationships in previous games, and that the song "Suteki da ne" helps improve the romantic atmosphere. The next dialogue, in which the new couple swear their eternal love for each other, further amplifies the atmosphere. Den of Geek's reviewer Jason Gallagher cited the eventual kiss in later part of the game as one of the best scenes in the entire franchise.

=== Analysis ===
In his paper "Procedural Religion in Videogames", Kristofer F. Sjølie said that Tidus and the player are both given commentary about religion in Spira, and arrive with their own answers about how this should continue. While analyzing the handling of religious figures, Anthony J Eisner said that Tidus' characterization and role in the game bear similarities to Christianity because he and Yuna are an example to society of people who can make their own decisions. Tidus' vulnerability while trapped in another world serves as an example for those who struggle with their freedom after experiencing a loss. Despite his initial immaturity, during his travels Tidus develops into a more serious teenager and takes Auron's words, "This is my story", to heart. Tidus' eventual sacrifice to defeat Yu Yevon was compared to that of Jesus, while other parts of his characterization parallel Shulk from Xenoblade Chronicles, who finds his purpose to fight for a new world. Mark Ivan Host compared Tidus to Luke Skywalker in the Star Wars films due to his youth and relationship with mentors, which allow him to reconcile with his father, as does Luke, who wishes to reconcile with Darth Vader in Return of the Jedi. Similarly, according to Christopher Bingham, while defeating Jecht appears to be a success to the player, Tidus expresses angst at his death, marking a contrast with other fictional stories, marking a similar character arc that Luke.

In their book Dungeons, Dragons, and Digital Denizens, authors Gerald A. Voorhees and Joshua Call compare Tidus with Final Fantasy VII protagonist Cloud Strife in appearance and weapon, finding that while Cloud influenced Tidus, the latter comes across as a more realistic character. In the 2009 thesis Final Fantasy X and Video Game Narrative: Re-Imagining the Quest Story, literary scholar Mark Host lists Seymour Guado as "the antithesis of Tidus", likening them to epic characters Beowulf and Grendel, as both Grendel and Seymour were social outcasts who lived in exile. Host also argues the similarities between the characters' backstories extend to their reasons for being exiled, with Grendel's banishment being a result of his father murdering a family member; Seymour's exiling was ordered by his father and preceded his murder whereas Tidus must kill his father Jecht to end Sin's revival.

There was also commentary about Tidus' disappearance in Final Fantasy X and eventual return. In The Kingdom's Shōnen Heart Transcultural Character Design and the JRPG, Rachael Hutchinson compares Tidus' disappearance to Riku's ending in Kingdom Hearts, though Tidus' case is handled more maturely. In "Revealing the differences: Resexualization in the textual pluralities of video game", multiple writers noted that while Tidus is not initially present in Final Fantasy X-2, his impact can be seen on Yuna who now acts in a more carefree and chidlish personality akin to Tidus'. While Yuna was called sexualized by multple by gamers, the scholar claims that it is a tribute to Tidus' design, notable for showing most of his torso. While the game often deals with the concept of dead spirits, Joseph Roach notes that Tidus' nature as a "Fayth" does not involve death, but instead a memory-like being who stands out among the Fayths for the maturity of his portrayal in the narrative. While Tidus becomes more heroic in the game and defeats Yu Yevon to end the cycle of death in Spira, he is haunted by death because the Fayths are unable to maintain a physical form. According to Joseph Roach, through his journeys and relationship with Yuna, Tidus becomes his own individual, especially in Final Fantasy X-2, because he regains his body.

== See also ==
- Characters of Final Fantasy X and X-2
