= Seduced by Madness =

- Also known as: Seduced by Madness: The Diane Borchardt Story
- Genre: Crime; Drama; Thriller
- Written by: Carmen Culver
- Directed by: John Patterson
- Starring: Ann-Margret; Peter Coyote; Leslie Hope; Christian Campbell; Hedy Burress; Tobey Maguire; Freddy Rodríguez
- Composer: Craig Safan
- Country of origin: United States
- Original language: English
- No. of episodes: 2

Production
- Executive producers: Roger Smith; Alan Margulies
- Producers: David R. Elliott; Brooke Kennedy; Brian Pike
- Cinematography: Thomas Burstyn
- Editors: Michael Kewley; Terry Stokes
- Running time: 200 min.
- Production companies: Brian Pike Productions; Ann-Margret Productions; NBC Productions

Original release
- Network: NBC
- Release: February 25 – February 26, 1996

Seduced by Madness: The Diane Borchardt Story is a 1996 American television miniseries directed by John Patterson and starring Ann-Margret, Peter Coyote, Leslie Hope, Christian Campbell, Hedy Burress, Tobey Maguire, and Freddy Rodríguez. Based roughly on real-life events, the film recounts the story of Wisconsin teacher Diane Borchardt, who hired teen students first to spy on her cheating husband and later to kill him. The film begins with the murder then traces in flashback the events leading up to it, followed by the subsequent police investigation leading to arrests and eventual murder convictions of both Borchardt and the teens.

== Plot ==
In the film, the story begins with three teenage boys breaking into the house of Ruben Borchardt with the intention of killing him for payment. The film then jumps back seven months earlier to the fall of 1993. Ruben's wife, Diane, is portrayed as mentally unstable and abusive towards Ruben and their children. Ruben meets Claire, a woman he develops feelings for, and they begin an affair. They contemplate leaving their spouses to be together.

Ruben decides to divorce Diane and gain custody of their children, which angers Diane. She manipulates her students, including Doug, to carry out her plan to kill Ruben. Diane bribes Doug with money and jewelry to carry out the murder. Doug recruits his friends Josh and Mike to help him. Diane continues to harass Claire and threatens her life.

Diane physically abuses Ruben and falsely accuses him of hitting her. They separate temporarily, and Diane plans to carry out the murder while she is away from the house on Easter Sunday. On that day, Doug and his friends break into Ruben's house, shoot him with a shotgun, and flee the scene. Ruben's son Chuck discovers his father bleeding and calls for help. Ruben dies in the hospital.

The police investigation begins, and they suspect Diane's involvement. They discover the photographs of Ruben and Claire together and question the boys who took the pictures. Doug struggles to get the money promised by Diane and eventually confesses his involvement to the police. Mike and Shannon are also arrested. Diane tries to conceal her guilt but is eventually arrested as well.

During the trials, Doug and Mike are charged with first-degree murder, Josh pleads guilty and testifies against the others, and Shannon is charged with perjury. Diane is found guilty of first-degree intentional homicide and breaks down in court. The Borchardt family, along with Brook's husband and newborn son, visit Ruben's grave and reflect on his life.

== Cast ==
- Ann-Margret as Diane Kay Borchardt
- Peter Coyote as Ruben Borchardt
- Leslie Hope as Claire Brown
- Hedy Burress as Brooke Borchardt
- Tobey Maguire as Chuck Borchardt
- Veronica Lauren as Regan Borchardt
- Christian Campbell as Douglas Vest Jr.
- Freddy Rodriguez as Michael Maldonado
- Johnny Strong as Tim
- Jonah Blechman as Joshua Yanke
- Alanna Ubach as Shannon Johnson
- Danny Masterson as Seth
- Aeryk Egan as Elgin Thomas
- Scott Michael Campbell as Cory
- Cliff De Young as Detective Burstyn
- Dean Norris as Detective Pike
- Belinda Balaski as The Principal
- Rebecca Stein as Sister

== Production ==
Ulysses S. Grant High School in Los Angeles, California was used as the filming location for the external scenes at the high school where Diane Borchardt teaches.

During production, the names of several individuals involved in the case were deliberately changed for their purposes and those of the film.
