= Hedy Burress =

American actress

- Education: Millikin University
- Occupation: Actress
- Years active: 1992–present
- Spouse: Gary Fullerton (m. 2000; died 2004)

Hedy Burress is an American actress. She had a starring role in the film Foxfire as Maddy, and later landed roles in television shows Boston Common and E.R. In the video game world, she is best known as the English voice of leading character Yuna in Final Fantasy X and its sequel Final Fantasy X-2.

== Life and career ==
Burress attended Millikin University in Decatur, Illinois, before relocating to Los Angeles, in 1995.

She made her film debut in the 1996 film Foxfire, starring opposite Angelina Jolie and Peter Facinelli. Burress auditioned for the role of Dorothy Wheeler in the motion picture Valentine, but the role went to Jessica Capshaw. However, director Jamie Blanks still wanted Burress to star in the film.

On television, she co-starred in the short-lived NBC sitcom Boston Common and has made many guest appearances in various television shows. Burress was a recurring cast member in the final season of the medical drama E.R. She then went on to become a recurring cast member of the police drama Southland.

Burress performs many voice-over roles. She is best is known by gamers as the English voice actress of Yuna in the PlayStation 2 games Final Fantasy X and Final Fantasy X-2, and reprised the role in later releases, such as Kingdom Hearts II and Dissidia 012 Final Fantasy.

Burress is also an accomplished theater actress, appearing in many plays and musicals in the Los Angeles area.

== Personal life ==
Burress married Marine reservist Gary Fullerton in October 2000. In July 2004, Fullerton died in a crash during a training exercise.

== Filmography ==
=== Film ===
Year	Title	Role	Notes
1996	Foxfire	Maddy Wirtz	
1996	If These Walls Could Talk	Linda Barrows	Television film
1997	Any Mother's Son	Kathy	Television film
1998	Getting Personal	Melissa Parks	
1998	The Stolen Years	Kathy	
1999	Swing Vote		Television film
2000	Cabin by the Lake	Mallory	Television film
2000	Tick Tock	Anne Avery	
2001	Valentine	Ruthie Walker	
2001	Looking for Bobby D	Belinda	Short film
2002	Bug	Roy - Chicken Eater	
2003	The Animatrix	Cis (segment "Program"); Yoko (segment "Beyond") (voice)	
2004	Open House	Gloria Hibbs	
2004	The Chronicles of Riddick: Dark Fury	Lab Tech (voice)	Direct-to-video
2004	Silver Lake	Julie Patterson	Television film
2005	The Reality Trap	Cindy	
2006	Round it Goes	Women #2	Short film
2008	Jane Doe: Eye of the Beholder	Joanne Nagle	Television film
2009	He's Just Not That Into You	Laura	
2009	What Happens in Encino	Wendy	Short film
2009	Everything Happens in Black in White	Women	Short film
2010	Elevator Girl	Tessa	Television film

=== Television ===
Year	Title	Role	Notes
1996	Seduced by Madness: The Diane Borchardt Story	Brooke Borchardt	mini-series
1996–1997	Boston Common	Wyleen Pritchett	32 episodes
1998	The Closer	Alex McLaren	10 episodes
1998	Working	Dawn	Episode: "A Boy, a Girl, and his Bird"
1998	Profiler	Virginia 'Ginny' Tibbet	Episode: "Home for the Homicide"
2000	Pepper Ann	Effie Shrugg (voice)	2 episodes
2000	Chicken Soup for the Soul	Katie	Episode: "Father"
2000	DAG	Susan Cole	Episode: "Pilot"
2001	The Weekenders	Kristi (voice)	2 episodes
2001	Gideon's Crossing	Money Raspberry Dupree	6 episodes
2002	First Monday	Ellie Pearson	13 episodes
2003	Ninja Scroll: The Series	Sen (voice)	Episode: "Amayodori"
2004	Cold Case	Janet Lambert	Episode: "Mind Hunters"
2004	House M.D.	Jill	Episode: "Maternity"
2006	Pink Collar	Claire	
2007	Unfabulous	Cruise Director Tammy	2 episodes
2008	Eli Stone	Felicia Swain	Episode: "Father Figure"
2008	Saving Grace	Jack Fielding's aunt	Episode: "Are You an Indian Princess"
2009	ER	Joanie Moore	4 episodes
2009–2011, 2013	Southland	Laurie Cooper	8 episodes
2010	CSI: Crime Scene Investigation	Julianne Torse	Episode: "Take My Life, Please"
2010	The Closer	Melanie Ryder	Episode: "The Big Bang"
2010	Lie to Me	Steph Salinger	Episode: "In the Red"
2011	Detroit 1-8-7	Shayna Wilkins	Episode: "Road to Nowhere"
2011	Curious George	Teacher (voice)	Episode: "Follow That Boat/Windmill Monkey"
2012	Criminal Minds	Samantha Allen	Episode: "Foundation"
2012	Common Law	Suzanne	Episode: "Role Play"
2013	Perception	Ellen Resnick	Episode: "Alienation"
2014	Shameless	Doctor	Episode: "Iron City"
2016	The Swipe Life	Charlie	Unknown episodes

=== Video games ===
Year	Title	Role	Notes
2001	Final Fantasy X	Yuna	
2003	Final Fantasy X-2	Yuna	
2005	Kingdom Hearts II	Yuna	
2006	Project Sylpheed	Sandra Redbird	Credited as Hedy Buress
2008	Final Fantasy Tactics: The War of the Lions	Agrias Oaks	
2008	Valkyria Chronicles	Brigitte "Rosie" Stark	
2009	Terminator Salvation	Resistance Soldier	
2010	Valkyria Chronicles 2	Chloe Bixen, Brigitte "Rosie" Stark	
2011	Star Wars: The Old Republic	Various voices	
2011	Dissidia 012 Final Fantasy	Yuna	
2011	Final Fantasy XIII-2	Various voices	
2016	Final Fantasy Explorers	Yuna	Archived Audio
2016	World of Final Fantasy	Yuna	
2018	The Walking Dead: The Final Season	Brody	
2018	Mobius Final Fantasy	Yuna	
2018	Dissidia Final Fantasy NT	Yuna	
