= Yuna (Final Fantasy) =

Fictional character from Final Fantasy series

- Final Fantasy character
- Yuna in Final Fantasy X, as illustrated by Tetsuya Nomura.
- First game: Final Fantasy X (2001)
- Created by: Yoshinori Kitase
- Designed by: Tetsuya Nomura; Tetsu Tsukamoto (X-2)
- Voiced by: EN: Hedy Burress; JA: Mayuko Aoki
- Motion capture: Mayuko Aoki
- Portrayed by: Nakamura Yonekichi

In-universe information
- Race: Half Al Bhed
- Weapon: Staff (FFX); Guns (FFX-2)
- Home: Besaid

Yuna (ユウナ, Yūna) is a character from Square Enix's Final Fantasy series. She was introduced as the female protagonist and one of the main playable characters of the role-playing video game Final Fantasy X (2001). She appears as a summoner embarking on a journey to defeat the world-threatening monster, Sin, alongside her companions, including the male protagonist, Tidus. Yuna reappears in Final Fantasy X-2 (2003) as the main protagonist, searching for Tidus two years after his disappearance. Yuna has also appeared in other Square Enix games, including the fighting game Dissidia 012 Final Fantasy (2011).

Tetsuya Nomura based Yuna's overall design on hakama, but also wanted to give her outfit something that would flow and so gave her a furisode. Nomura said that her name means "night" in the Okinawan language, which contrasts with Tidus's name, which is Okinawan for "sun". For X-2, the game's staff wanted Tetsu Tsukamoto to redesign her costume to reflect her personality and the game's atmosphere.

Yuna has been well received by media critics and fans, with praise for her story in the first game, her relationship with Tidus, and her characterization. However, there was a mixed reception for her role in X-2 due to her redesigned appearance and aesthetics involving her changed personality.

== Appearances ==
In Final Fantasy X, Yuna is introduced as a summoner from the world of Spira who can control creatures known as aeons with help from spirits known as Fayths. Daughter of the late High Summoner Braska, who destroyed Sin ten years earlier, Yuna embarks on a quest to defeat Sin with her Guardians, Lulu and Wakka. Yuna must journey to temples across the world, acquire the aeon from each and summon the Final Aeon in a battle that will kill them both. In the meantime, she gradually becomes more open and falls in love with her guardian Tidus as both often talk about their pasts and aspire to see their home, Zanarkand. Upon arriving at the place where Yuna can summon the final aeon, Tidus persuades the group to look for another way to defeat Sin without using any sacrifices. After entering Sin's body, Tidus is forced to kill Braska's Aeon, his father Jecht, and Sin is later destroyed by the destruction of the disembodied spirit of Yu Yevon, who is responsible for reviving Sin after each defeat, allowing an eternal Calm to start in Spira. However, Tidus disappears as he is the product of the Fayth, who could not depart until Sin's defeat and has a sad separation from her. In the international version of the game, Yuna finds a blurry video of a man she believes to be Tidus and decides to go on a quest to find him.

In Final Fantasy X-2, set two years after FFX, Yuna is a member of the sphere hunting group, the Gullwings (カモメ団, Kamome Dan; lit. "Seagulls"), along with her cousin Rikku and the silent Paine formed by the Al-bhed members Brother and Buddy, Rikku's relatives. In the game's international version, the Gullwings go their separate ways before the game's opening, with Yuna returning to Besaid Island. The trio then reunites to explore a newfound tower. In X-2, Yuna journeys to Spira in search of the truth behind a sphere containing a video featuring a man resembling Tidus in prison. During her journey, Yuna discovers the man from the sphere was actually Shuyin, a spirit who wishes to destroy Spira in revenge for the death of his lover, Lenne. Yuna possesses a sphere from Lenne that allows her to replicate her singing and wishes to stop Shuyin's revenge. With the help of Paine's former comrades, the Gullwings defeat Shuyin, who departs to the afterlife with Lenne's spirit sealed in the sphere Yuna kept. Depending on the player's progress throughout the game, the Fayth may revive Tidus so that she can reunite with him. The game's HD Remastered version adds a new audio drama where Yuna becomes a part of the group called Yevoners, whose main temple is on Besaid. In the story, she breaks up with Tidus after telling him she loves somebody else before declaring she will fight the revived Sin once again.

She also appears in Dissidia 012 Final Fantasy, an action game that features several Final Fantasy characters, as one of the characters to be summoned by the goddess Cosmos to participate in a war against her rival, Chaos. For this game, Yuna appears in her Final Fantasy X form, but slightly arranged to fit with the game's cast. Yuna retains her memories from X and tries to make Tidus join her cast only for him to be wounded by The Emperor on his attempt to kill Yuna. Yuna is later killed by the mannekins alongside other Cosmos' soldiers in the end of the 012 narrative. Additionally, she has an alternative design based on Yoshitaka Amano's illustration, and a wedding dress from FFX. Her X-2 regular form was made available as downloadable content. She also appears in Dissidia NT as a warrior summoned by Cosmos's heir apparent, Materia, to take part in a war with her rival, Spiritus. However, Yuna is one of many characters summoned far away from the war and arrives well after its completion.

Outside the Final Fantasy series, Yuna appears in Kingdom Hearts II as a pixie along with Paine and Rikku. Bribed by Maleficent into spying on Leon's resistance group from Radiant Garden, the pixies eventually switch sides after being abandoned by the witch and told of Sora's cause. Yuna is also featured in the board game style video game Itadaki Street Special, appearing alongside Auron and Tidus, and represents Final Fantasy X in the rhythm game Theatrhythm Final Fantasy.

Multiple figures and figurines of Yuna were produced by various manufacturers, including a 2001 figure by Square. A 2003 audio CD Final Fantasy X-2 Vocal Collections features performances by Mayuko Aoki, Marika Matsumoto and Megumi Toyoguchi, the voice actresses for Yuna, Rikku and Paine, respectively. Yonekichi Nakamura portrays Yuna in the 2023 kabuki play adaptation of Final Fantasy X.

== Creation and development ==
Yuna's re-design for Final Fantasy X-2.

The concept for Yuna was created by producer Yoshinori Kitase, based on an early draft concept for Final Fantasy X of a world where people die when they reach seventeen years of age. The goal was for a character who was strong-willed and determined without being physically strong. Her name was meant to contrast against protagonist Tidus; while his name meant "sun" in Okinawan, Yuna's name meant "night". The relationship between Tidus and Yuna was always a central part of the plot, though other subplots such as Jecht's arc were later seen by Kitase as more moving.

Yuna was designed by recurring artist Tetsuya Nomura. Art director Yusuke Naora created a "tropical" draft design to go with the game's exotic Asian setting that was scrapped by Nomura in favour of a traditional Japanese look. Nomura based Yuna's design on hakama, a type of traditional Japanese clothing. Nomura said that after learning Yuna was to perform a dance called the "sending", he wanted to give her outfit something that would flow. For this reason, the specific type of kimono he chose for her was a furisode, a long-sleeved kimono. She was also given a flower motif using a hibiscus, which referenced her name. The motif of sun and night present in their names also extended to her accessories. The open back of her outfit was left over from a scrapped concept of visible tattoos representing a character's skills and abilities.

The positive fan reaction of FFX convinced the developers to continue Yuna's story and those of other characters with Final Fantasy X-2. Costume designer Tetsu Tsukamoto said that Yuna's radical design changes from one game to the other reflected a huge cultural change. Producer Yoshinori Kitase added that they did not want to make X-2 feel like an extension of its predecessor, so they changed the clothing of Yuna, Rikku, and others' to make them seem more active. They accomplished this before creating the story and setting. Because Yuna, Rikku, and Paine live in a more carefree world, the designers wanted them to dress up, a feature that became key to the gameplay. Scenario writer Kazushige Nojima described her new outfit as a "natural reaction to the heavy stuff she wore in FFX". Yuna's singing performance was used to demonstrate the pop feel that the game incorporates. Final Fantasy X director Motomu Toriyama said her personality was the result of not having her bear the responsibility of being a summoner anymore. He added that while "she could be seen as a completely different person, ... deep in her heart, she is the same old Yuna".

In the games' Japanese versions, Yuna has been voiced by Mayuko Aoki. Hedy Burress provides the character's voice in the English adaptations. Voicing Yuna, Burress remembers trying to translate Yuna's duty, respect, and honor and wanting to retain the gentleness and femininity of her character. When commenting on how the audiences would react to Final Fantasy X, Burress said that she wanted them to participate in the game itself and "transport them into a completely different world" through the voices. Nakamura Yonekichi portrayed her in the 2023 kabuki performances.

== Reception ==
Yuna has seen generally positive opinions from critics. Magazines have described her as one of the favorite and best Final Fantasy character. In official Square Enix polls, Yuna was voted the third most commonly favorite female Final Fantasy character in 2013. and the most popular Final Fantasy heroine in 2014. Readers of Game Informer voted Yuna's relationship with Tidus as the best of 2001. as well as 16th in a similar poll by Famitsu 2010. In a 2010 ASCII Media Works poll in which Japanese fans would vote whose video game or manga character would like to name their children after, Yuna came second in the female category.

In his review of Final Fantasy X-2, Jeremy Dunham of IGN praised the clothing designs, combining "proven and recognizable Final Fantasy styles" with a "revealing neo-modern fashion sense", referencing her warrior costume as a stand-out, and also said that English voice actress Burress's performance sounded more comfortable as opposed to the previous game. Brad Shoemaker of GameSpot praised Burress' voice acting, saying that it brought her fully to life in accordance with the other changes in the character. The book Packaging Girlhood: Rescuing Our Daughters from Marketers' Schemes described Yuna's appearance as being a "sexy MTV video star", adding that it is a "lesson to girls that being brave, strong, and ready to fight can only last so long – the next adventure is fashion, boyfriends, and sex". GameSpy's Raymond "Psylancer" Padilla called her "the video-game vixen of my dreams". Christian Nutt, also of GameSpy, described Burress' portrayal of Yuna in X-2 as superb. Various publications compared Yuna to other fictional characters, including the Charlie's Angels's Natalie Cook as portrayed by Cameron Diaz; and Tomb Raider star Lara Croft, due to her attire and gun-wielding skills. She was included on IGN's list of top 25 Final Fantasy characters, with Dave Smith commenting that while her original appearance made her "fine eye-candy" and her sending scene was one of the best works by the CG studio Square Visual Works, it was the sequel that gave her more confidence and attitude, as well as "a gratuitously exploitative costume". Although Tidus is not initially present in Final Fantasy X-2, his impact can be seen on Yuna who now acts in a more carefree and childish fashion while wearing a similar clothing in her regular version.

Negative response focused on the character's revealing clothes and singer areas which produced backlash enough from gamers to avoid labeling as an actual Final Fantasy game in contrast to previous more fitting heroes. GameSpot felt that while her character feels rewritten, the caring parts from Yuna remain intact, but still felt the costumes were too skimpy. Having criticized Burress's acting in the original game to the point that gamers feel the need of hearing to the Japanese actress, Eurogamer thought that the actress improved her work, but felt that Yuna's characterization might come across as too cheesy not only due to the usage of her as a singer involving Jpop most notably the Spice Girls. Similarly, GameSpy praised the improvement of Burress despite noticing poor lip syncing. Yuna's quest to Tidus was noted to be a strong narrative to motivate players but he felt such potential was lost as Square instead focused the plot on a series of sidequests which lack appeal. Gaming Age negatively compared the Gullwings with the film Charlie's Angels, panning the former for making as entire game unbearable especially when Yuna starts singing. Despite having mixed feelings about Yuna's traits from X-2, Fanbyte panned Yuna's characterization from the audio drama Will for going back to her original persona, undoing any type of character arc the character went through.

== See also ==
- Characters of Final Fantasy X and X-2
