= Mayuko Aoki =

Japanese actress and voice actress

- 青木 麻由子
- Born: December 17, 1975 (age 50); Kōchi Prefecture, Japan
- Occupations: Actress; voice actress
- Years active: 1997–present

Mayuko Aoki (青木 麻由子, Aoki Mayuko; born December 17, 1975) is a Japanese actress and voice actress who has worked on several anime and video game productions.

== Filmography ==
=== Anime ===
- Aquarian Age - Sign for Revolution – Yoriko Sannou
- Last Order -Final Fantasy VII- – Turk (shotgun)

=== Video games ===
- Final Fantasy X (2001) – Yuna
- Kingdom Hearts (2002) – Selphie Tilmitt
- Final Fantasy X-2 (2003) – Yuna
- Kingdom Hearts II (2005) – Selphie Tilmitt, Yuna
- Dissidia 012 Final Fantasy (2011) – Yuna
- Final Fantasy Type-0 (2011) – Seven
- Final Fantasy Explorers (2014) – Yuna
- Final Fantasy Type-0 HD (2015) – Seven
- World of Final Fantasy (2016) – Yuna
- Dissidia Final Fantasy: Opera Omnia (2017–18) – Yuna, Selphie Tilmitt, Seven
- Itadaki Street: Dragon Quest and Final Fantasy 30th Anniversary (2017) – Yuna
- Dissidia Final Fantasy NT (2018) – Yuna

=== Motion Capture ===
- Final Fantasy VIII (1999) – Rinoa Heartilly, Edea Kramer
- Final Fantasy IX (2000) – Garnet Til Alexandros XVII
- Final Fantasy X (2001) – Yuna
- Final Fantasy X-2 (2003) – Yuna
- Final Fantasy VII: Advent Children (2005) – Tifa Lockhart
