= Blitzball (Final Fantasy) =

Final Fantasy minigame

Screenshot of Blitzball being played, with a character currently holding the ball.

Blitzball is a sports minigame that appears in the 2001 and 2003 role-playing video games Final Fantasy X and X-2, designed almost entirely by Yoshinori Kitase, the games' producer. It involves a fictional, fantastical underwater sport of the same name that uses six-person teams, with the ultimate aim of scoring by throwing or kicking the ball into the opposing team's goal. The game is played underwater in a large "sphere pool" kept suspended in midair by magic, and plays an integral role in the fictional universe of Spira, with the protagonist of FFX, Tidus, having been a star Blitzball player in the city of Zanarkand. The playable character Wakka is also a Blitzball player, and uses a ball from the sport to attack enemies. Both games feature a different implementation of the minigame; the version from Final Fantasy X was divisive, with some fans and critics seeing it as one of the best video game minigames, and expressing a desire for it to return in the MMORPG Final Fantasy XIV, or as a standalone spinoff title. Others disliked the minigame, and the fact that it was required to play to progress within Final Fantasy X. Blitzball has also been referenced outside Final Fantasy, appearing in the Star Wars extended universe.

== Appearances ==
Blitzball is first seen in Final Fantasy X being played by Tidus in Zanarkand, where it is a popular sport. After Zanarkand is seemingly annihilated by the giant monster Sin and Tidus arrives in Spira proper, he sees how the ancient game has been appropriated into Spira's culture after a thousand years. Blitzball has become Spira's only mainstream form of entertainment, and one of its main uniting factors and sources of joy, allowing citizens to take their minds off the ever present-threat of Sin. Zanarkand's Blitzball sign for victory found its way into modern Spira as a sacred hand gesture and incantation, its sporting origins seemingly forgotten. Final Fantasy X Scenario Ultimania states that it is the unique properties of the pyrefly-saturated water in the Blitzball arena that enables players to breathe liquid for the 5 minutes required for each half-time.

Blitzball also appears in the game's sequel, Final Fantasy X-2, in a different form where individual team members are no longer controllable.

== Gameplay ==
=== In Final Fantasy X ===
Blitzball is played with the player controlling their team members in sequence. Similar to ice hockey, there is a six-player team consisting of a goalkeeper, two defenders, a midfielder, and two forwards. The aim is to throw a dimpled ball (called the blitzball) into the opponent's goal area. The team with the most goals after two five-minute halves is declared the winner. As characters advance through the ranks, they learn techniques to improve both their offensive and defensive skills, including from other Blitzball players using the skill Tech Copy.

Defensive techniques in Blitzball often include violent tackles. Some tackles are intended to poison, cripple, or knock opponents unconscious altogether. As substitutions are not allowed outside of halftime intermissions, the use of these techniques can offer teams a temporary numerical advantage. Goalkeepers can also learn some techniques such as "Supergoalie," which helps to catch fast balls. Offensive techniques include the "Sphere Shot," an underwater version of a bicycle kick, and the "Jecht Shot," a similar goal-shooting technique that renders up to two defense players unconscious.

When the minigame first becomes available in Final Fantasy X, the player takes control of the Besaid Aurochs, and is given a standard player roster, which the player may alter by signing up other players from around the world, including players who began as members of other teams. Likewise, other teams may change their rosters. Each Blitzball player has individual stat growths in HP, Attack, Passing and Blocking, with some players changing drastically as they level up. For example, the lackluster starting goalie of the Aurochs, Keepa, becomes one of the game's best shooters when he surpasses level 90.

Teams with few or no named players also appear in Final Fantasy X. They are the Zanarkand Abes and the Zanarkand Duggles, which were featured in the opening full motion video of the game. In Final Fantasy X Ultimania Omega, two additional teams are mentioned: the Bevelle Bells and Yocun Nomads.

=== In Final Fantasy X-2 ===
Unlike in FFX, players no longer directly manipulate the actions of their Blitzball team members, and it is instead a management-type simulation game. The Gullwings, Yuna's sphere-hunting group, fills in for the Aurochs when Blitzball season starts. In this version of the minigame, if a team leads the game by seven goals at any point, they automatically win. The Zanarkand Abes are also available as opponents, with Tidus replaced by a player named "Ace".

== Development ==
In a retrospective interview with producer Yoshinori Kitase, he said that he did not expect Blitzball to have such a divisive reaction amongst fans. Kitase had created the Blitzball minigame largely on his own, partially for his enjoyment. It was initially planned as a completely optional feature, but was changed to be a requirement for obtaining a powerful weapon. Kitase apologized for making "some fans suffer" due to this, calling it characteristic of games of the era.

== Reception ==
Corey Plante of Kotaku described Blitzball as the most divisive minigame of the series, calling it a risky creative choice for Tidus's backstory, akin to if Cloud Strife from Final Fantasy VII was also a professional snowboarder. While he criticized the game's mechanics as "clunky" and "complex", he praised the aspect of scouting players from across Spira, commending the minigame on "how effectively it makes you see the humanity in every person you meet in Spira". Edwin Evins-Thirlwell of Eurogamer used Blitzball as an example of a Final Fantasy minigame he enjoyed, calling it "patently daft in the best of ways". Characterizing it as "essentially rugby but played in a stadium-sized water bubble", he stated that, while "Blitzball has its flaws as a virtual sport", such as not being able to move vertically, he summed it up as "an immensely fun addition" to the game, partially for being able to scout players. Carlos Zotomayor of Automaton West stated his desire for a standalone spinoff Blitzball game, noting that its recruitment mechanic would work well as a gacha game, as well as its potential for online multiplayer. Brad Kane of Reactor magazine called Blitzball the most memorable part of FFX, but said that he would not play it as a standalone title, describing it as a necessary way for players to relax in a game with such a serious subject matter. Retro Gamer magazine characterized Blitzball as a "fun diversion", albeit not the "all-action affair" depicted in the game's cutscenes.

Giancarlo Vasquez of RPGFan called Blitzball the "unsung hero" of Final Fantasy X, specifically citing its foreshadowing of the game's thematic points. Comparing sports fandom to religious zealotry, he notes that Blitzball mirrors Spira's worship of Yevon. Describing it as representative of "the everlasting battle between humanity's failings and their drive to overcome them", he called it "the final bastion of humanity" and an integral part of how humanity is able to defeat Sin. Inverse called Blitzball one of the most inventive minigames in the series, stating that it would fit well in the Dawntrail expansion of Final Fantasy XIV. In contrast, Jade King of TheGamer heavily criticized the minigame, saying that it "sucks". Saying that "there's no skill involved, the various players you can control don't matter, and the pacing of each game is so scattershot" that it was pointless to assemble a strategy, she suggested swimming behind the net after scoring a goal, causing the game's AI to break and be unable to retaliate. Describing it as a "pile of garbage" in comparison to other series minigames like Tetra Master, she nevertheless stated that she liked its lore aspects, saying that it "truly belongs in the setting, bringing a sense of community to many of its locations", but that it was poorly realized as a minigame.

The Star Wars novel Brotherhood makes a passing mention to a sport named Blitzball being played underwater in a local lake in that fictional universe, which was confirmed to reference the Final Fantasy sport by author Mike Chen, who was a fan of the minigame.
