= Dissidia 012 Final Fantasy =

2011 video game

- North American cover art featuring the cast of the game
- Developer: Square Enix 1st Production Department
- Publisher: Square Enix
- Director: Mitsunori Takahashi
- Producer: Ichiro Hazama
- Programmer: Ryuji Ikeda
- Artist: Mihoko Ishii
- Writers: Akiko Ishibashi; Saori Itamuro
- Composer: Takeharu Ishimoto
- Series: Final Fantasy
- Platform: PlayStation Portable
- Release: JP: March 3, 2011; NA: March 22, 2011; PAL: March 25, 2011
- Genres: Fighting, action role-playing
- Modes: Single-player, multiplayer

Dissidia 012 Final Fantasy (pronounced as Dissidia Duodecim Final Fantasy (Note: Japanese: ディシディア デュオデシム ファイナルファンタジー, Hepburn: Dishidia Dyuodeshimu Fainaru Fantajī)) is a 2011 fighting game developed and published by Square Enix for the PlayStation Portable as part of the Final Fantasy series. It was developed by the company's 1st Production Department and released worldwide in March 2011. The game is both a prequel and remake of Dissidia Final Fantasy, revealing what occurred before the events of its predecessor.

The game initially focuses on the twelfth war between the gods Chaos and Cosmos who have summoned several warriors from parallel worlds to fight for them. Upon ending the twelfth cycle, the game remakes the thirteenth war from the original Dissidia Final Fantasy and adds multiple side-stories. Fights in Dissidia 012 were given the ability to counteract enemies' strongest attacks by using assisting characters, while navigation is now done through a traditional-styled Final Fantasy world map.

Development of the game started in August 2009 with the Square staff wishing to improve the gameplay from the first game to provide players with more entertaining features as well as balance several parts. Dissidia 012 has been well received, with publications calling it one of the best PlayStation Portable games.

== Gameplay ==
Gameplay is largely reminiscent of Dissidia Final Fantasy along with a few changes. The game consists primarily of one-on-one battles, taking place on what is known as a battle map where the two characters duel. Players are able to perform two types of attacks: a Bravery attack and an HP attack. Both characters start with a set number of Bravery points, the number of Bravery points being equivalent to the amount of damage dealt by an HP attack. Thus, the player must perform several Bravery attacks to steal Bravery points from the opponent so as to increase the power of their HP attack, as Bravery attacks do not cause any damage.

=== Additional mechanics ===
The mechanics of the battle system include "EX Revenge" and "Assist". EX Mode functions exactly the same as the first game by collecting EX Cores around the battle map to fill up the EX gauge and transform the character into a more powerful state, which allows players to perform a powerful EX Burst attack should an HP attack land during EX Mode. The Assist system is a new element to the game which allows the player to summon an additional ally into battle to either assist in attacking the enemy or defend from an oncoming attack. It is performed using the Assist Gauge, which is built up by using Bravery Attacks. Both modes are supposed to balance each other, because when an EX Burst is executed, the opponent's Assist Gauge is reduced to zero.

The three main countering systems are Assist Breaks, EX Breaks and EX Revenge. An Assist Break is performed by attacking the opponent's Assist character while the player is in EX Mode, causing him/her to be unable to call out the Assist character for a brief period; this also passes the stage's Bravery points to the character. An EX Break is performed by stopping an opponent's EX Mode through the use of an Assist attack which forces the opponent out of EX Mode, additionally passing the stage's Bravery points to the player. Lastly, EX Revenge occurs when trying to activate EX Mode while being attacked. While in the first game it would simply halt the opponent's attack, it now slows down time allowing the player to pummel the opponent instead, though it sacrifices the player's ability to use an EX Burst as it uses up the entire EX Gauge.

=== Single-player mode ===
A screenshot showing the single-player mode of the game. The game's world map, with new characters Lightning, Kain and Tifa as the three-member party.

The biggest addition is within the single-player story mode of the game, taking place on a traditional-styled Final Fantasy world map, with players being able to experience a story while exploring a world with scenarios and events taking place as the story progresses. Players traverse the 3D world map with parties consisting of up to five characters, with players being able to interact in conversations with the characters. When roaming the map, players will encounter enemies known as "Manikins"; when attacked by an enemy, players will be transported to a battle map where battles will take place. There are specially marked shops on the map. The story mode is also party based, similar to the story progression of Final Fantasy VI. In certain scenarios, parties will be predetermined, but in most cases players are free to select their own party. Alongside the game's new story mode, the game also includes the first game's story, which has been remade with the 3D world map as well as additional elements added for the new storyline. Tetsuya Nomura, producer and character designer for the game, has said that both storylines played together would result in approximately 60 hours of gameplay.

== Plot ==
=== Setting and characters ===
The game's main story revolves around the twelfth cycle of the eternal conflict between the gods Cosmos and Chaos, who have both summoned several warriors from different worlds to fight for them in "World B", a mirror dimension to the realm of World A. It features the entire cast of the original Dissidia with new and tweaked abilities, and introduces nine new playable characters for a total of thirty-one. Six of the new characters are available from the start of the game: Lightning, a former soldier and the protagonist of Final Fantasy XIII; Vaan, a sky pirate and the protagonist of XII; Laguna Loire, the man who appears in Squall's dreams and the secondary protagonist of VIII; Yuna, Tidus's love interest and female protagonist of X; Kain Highwind, Cecil Harvey's childhood friend and rival from IV; and Tifa Lockhart, Cloud Strife's childhood friend from VII. The remaining three characters, which can be unlocked through various means of gameplay, are Prishe, a supporting character from Final Fantasy XI; Gilgamesh, a recurring villain from Final Fantasy V; and Feral Chaos, (Note: デスペラードカオス, Desuperādo Kaosu; "Desperado Chaos") an alternate form of Chaos. Final Fantasy VII's Aerith Gainsborough was available as an assist-only character (i.e. not fully playable in the game) through the purchase of Dissidia 012 Prologus Final Fantasy on the PlayStation Network.

=== Story ===
During the twelfth cycle, the war is turning in favor of Chaos. Therefore, Cosmos entrusts her warriors with the task of retrieving the crystals that will help them defeat Chaos. However, Cosmos does not foresee Chaos's forces employing an unworldly army of crystalline soldiers known as Manikins, which pose a threat due to their ability to negate the gods' power to revive the warriors after they are killed. Believing their defeat to be inevitable, Kain and the Warrior of Light defeat most of their own allies to stop them from fighting the Manikins and return in the upcoming cycle. Lightning opposes this plan and leads the other active warriors—Vaan, Yuna, Laguna, and Tifa—to stop the Manikins once and for all by sealing the portal from which they emerge, with Kain eventually joining them as well. Though they succeed, Cosmos is reduced to a weakened state after using much of her power to diminish the Manikin army when they attempt to kill her and the Warrior of Light, while Lightning and her group succumb to the Manikins' power and fade away.

From there, the game retells the events of Dissidia Final Fantasy where returning warriors for Cosmos participate in the thirteenth cycle that ends the conflict between the gods. Once completing the thirteenth cycle, the player also has access to the third and final arc "Confessions of the Creator", in which Shinryu—a powerful entity that absorbs the warriors' memories and experiences following each cycle—traps Cosmos' comrade, Cid of the Lufaine, in a nightmare world where the cycles never end as punishment for saving Cosmos' warriors from the thirteenth cycle following Chaos' defeat. The player selects five characters to fight Feral Chaos, a stronger incarnation of Chaos, and save the imprisoned Cid from the nightmare world.

In addition to the main story is a set of "Reports", most of which follow the other warriors who participate in the thirteenth cycle, explaining their roles before and during that cycle. Prominent characters in these reports include warriors of Cosmos—Terra, Cloud and Tidus—who fight for the side of Chaos during the twelfth cycle, and Chaos's warrior Jecht, who appears on the side of Cosmos, with the reports detailing how these characters came to switch sides. Furthermore, the Reports cover other events such as how the Warrior of Light enters the conflict and meets Cosmos's previous warriors Prishe and Shantotto, along with Gilgamesh's misadventures upon stumbling into World B.

== Development ==
Ideas for a sequel to Dissidia Final Fantasy were already conceived shortly after its release in Japan with creative producer Tetsuya Nomura wishing to feature Kain Highwind on it. Development of the game started in August 2009 shortly before the release of Dissidia Final Fantasy Universal Tuning, the international version from the predecessor. Director Mitsunori Takahashi said that the team wanted the sequel to have more changes than just new characters. This resulted in changes to gameplay features and the inclusion of new ones. The Assist feature was made to add more entertainment to the fights, as well as to act as a counterbalance to the EX Mode that was the strongest area from the first game. This was done in response to feedback commenting that the EX Mode was too powerful in the original game. The world map was created in order to appeal more the RPG fans. Returning characters had their movesets modified to provide the player with new strategies when fighting. One of the most revised ones was Firion due to feedback from players. Since the original Dissidia had a concrete conclusion, the staff decided to make its story a prequel and encourage players to revisit Dissidia once concluding it.

Choosing new characters proved difficult as the staff chose them based on their popularity and fighting styles. The amount of new characters was restricted due to memory limitations. Vaan's inclusion met several hardships since his Japanese voice actor, Kouhei Takeda, was busy at the time. They decided to replace Takeda with Kenshō Ono as a result of fan response. Battle system director Takeo Kujiraoka made contact with Hiroyuki Ito regarding the character's design and moves based on his Final Fantasy XII appearances, which was well received by Ito. While designed by Tetsuya Nomura, various of the new alternative outfits the characters were given were based on artworks by Yoshitaka Amano, another designer from the Final Fantasy series.

=== Downloadable content ===
Three other Square Enix games, Final Fantasy Trading Card Game, Kingdom Hearts Birth by Sleep Final Mix, and The 3rd Birthday, give players access to downloadable content in the form of alternate outfits for Vaan, Cloud Strife, and Lightning, respectively. As of June 2011, the PlayStation Network has featured downloadable content for Dissidia 012 Final Fantasy, including character costumes, avatars, and BGM packs.

== Music ==
The music for Dissidia 012 Final Fantasy was composed by Takeharu Ishimoto and features multiple rearrangements from previous Final Fantasy themes by other composers. The American band Kidneythieves also sang the second part of the Feral Chaos' boss theme song, "God in Fire". Ishimoto wrote the song and requested Kidneythieves' collaboration with them to which the band stated it was entertaining. Square Enix released the Dissidia 012 Final Fantasy Original Soundtrack on March 3, 2011, featuring a total of three discs with the first one having 44, the second one 20, and the third one seven.

Track list

Disc 1
No.	Title	Japanese title	Length
1.	"Lux Concordiae"
2.	"Matoya's Cave" (arrange)
3.	"Chaos Shrine" (arrange)
4.	"Mount Gulug" (original)
5.	"Reform"
6.	"Dungeon" (arrange)
7.	"Pandemonium" (arrange)
8.	"The Imperial Army" (original)
9.	"Gentle Breath"
10.	"Crystal Cave" (arrange)
11.	"Battle 1" (arrange)
12.	"Let Me Know the Truth" (original)
13.	"Heroes"
14.	"Into the Darkness" (arrange)		2:23
15.	"Suspicion" (arrange)
16.	"Fight 1" (arrange)
17.	"Theme of Love" (original)
18.	"Peace of Mind"
19.	"Dungeon" (arrange)
20.	"The Final Battle" (arrange)
21.	"Home, Sweet Home" (original)
22.	"Tension"
23.	"Phantom Forest" (arrange)
24.	"Battle Theme" (arrange)
25.	"Searching for Friends" (original)
26.	"The Threat"
27.	"Tifa's Theme" (arrange)
28.	"Forested Temple" (arrange)
29.	"J-E-N-O-V-A" (arrange)
30.	"Let the Battles Begin!" (original)
31.	"Counterattack"	「進軍」from Dissidia Final Fantasy	2:34
32.	"Find Your Way" (arrange)
33.	"Julia" (arrange)
34.	"Force Your Way" (arrange)
35.	"Premonition" (original)
36.	"Troops"
37.	"A Place to Call Home" (arrange)	「進軍」from Dissidia Final Fantasy	2:34
38.	"The Final Battle" (arrange)
39.	"Not Alone" (original)
40.	"Final Resolve"
41.	"Yuna's Theme" (arrange)
42.	"A Contest of Aeons" (arrange)
43.	"Via Purifico" (original)
44.	"A Fleeting Dream" (original)

Disc 2
No.	Title	Japanese title	Length
1.	"Dissidia" (opening/edit)
2.	"A Realm of Emptiness" (arrange)
3.	"Ronfaure" (original)
4.	"Heavens Tower" (original)
5.	"Iron Colossus" (original)
6.	"Canto Mortis ~An Undocumented Battle~"
7.	"Battle with an Esper" (arrange)
8.	"The Dalmasca Estersand" (original)
9.	"The Golmore Jungle" (original)
10.	"Struggle for Freedom" (original)
11.	"Gate to the Rift"
12.	"Blinded by Light" (arrange)
13.	"Saber's Edge" (arrange)
14.	"The Hanging Edge" (original)
15.	"The Archylte Steppe" (original)
16.	"Nascent Requiem" (original)
17.	"Cantata Mortis & God in Fire"
18.	"Carmen Lucis"	「Battle in the Dungeon #2 -original-」from Final Fantasy XI	1:32
19.	"Final Fantasy"
20.	"Dissidia 012" (ending)

Disc 3
No.	Title	Length
1.	"Cantata Mortis"
2.	"God of Fire"
3.	"Overture"
4.	"Dissidia Final Fantasy"
5.	"Dissidia Final Fantasy"
6.	"Dissidia 012 Final Fantasy"
7.	"Dissidia 012 Final Fantasy"

== Reception ==
Reception

Aggregate score
Aggregator	Score
Metacritic	78/100

Review scores
Publication	Score
1Up.com	A−
Famitsu	38/40
Game Informer	7/10
GameSpot	8.0/10
IGN	9.0/10

Upon its first week of release Dissidia 012 sold 286,117 units in Japan, topping the Media Create's charts by replacing Phantasy Star Portable 2 Infinity. Although it managed first place, Dissidia 012 performed far below its predecessor. The original sold close to 500,000 units in its first week on December 18, 2008. It has sold 465,198 units in Japan as of January 2012. It has received positive reception. Dissidia 012 was scored a 38/40 by Famitsu, composed of a 10, 9, 10, 9 score by the four reviewers, two points higher than the original. PSM3 gave the game an 8.2, calling it an "improvement on the original, with some great Final Fantasy fan service thrown in". IGN gave the game a 9.0 (one point higher than the original), praising the game's graphics and improved gameplay, but criticizing its story. Game Informer gave the game a 7, saying the game did not improve any of the battle system problems of the previous game, although the assist system was a good addition, saying it added an extra dimension to what was missing in the first game. GamesRadar+ listed it as the ninth best PlayStation Portable game commenting on how it uses elements from famous RPGs, while IGN listed it third with comments aimed towards its gameplay.
