= List of Front Mission media =

Franchise of video games and media

Front Mission (フロントミッション, Furonto Misshon) is a series of tactical role-playing video games published by Square, now Square Enix. The first game of the series was published in 1995 and was developed by G-Craft, a studio that was later absorbed by Square as Product Development Division-6. G-Craft or Division-6 has produced every Front Mission game since, with the exceptions of Front Mission: Gun Hazard (Omiya Soft), Front Mission Evolved (Double Helix Games), and Front Mission 2089: Border of Madness (h.a.n.d.). Since the release of the original game, the series has gone on to encompass several media, including films, manga, novels, radio dramas, and toys. The video games in the series have also ventured into other genres besides tactical role-playing, such as side-scrolling shooter, real-time strategy, third-person shooter, and massively multiplayer online games. The main storyline of the series encompasses seven different games. In addition to these, five spin-off titles have been produced, set both in the same universe as the main games and in alternate worlds.

The initial selling point of Front Mission was its storytelling approach. Taking place during the 21st and 22nd centuries, the series revolves around military conflicts and political tension between powerful supranational unions and their member states. Although the Front Mission video games use self-contained, standalone stories, these tie into a greater overarching storyline that encompasses the entire series. In combination with the stories from its other media, the series possesses a level of storytelling depth and continuity comparable to a serial drama.

== Video games ==
=== Main series ===
Main series
Game	Details
Front Mission Original release dates: JP: February 24, 1995; NA: November 23, 2007; (Nintendo DS version)	Release years by system: 1995 – Super Famicom; 2002 – WonderSwan Color; 2003 – PlayStation (Front Mission 1st); 2007 – Nintendo DS
Front Mission Original release dates: JP: February 24, 1995; NA: November 23, 2007; (Nintendo DS version)	Notes: PlayStation version is titled Front Mission 1st, and contains a new story campaign and other new content.; Nintendo DS version is an enhanced port of the PlayStation version.; Takes place after the events of Front Mission 2089 and Front Mission 2089-II, and is set in 2090.; Included in the Front Mission History (PlayStation, 2003) collection.
Front Mission 2 Original release date: JP: September 25, 1997	Release years by system: 1997 – PlayStation
Front Mission 2 Original release date: JP: September 25, 1997	Notes: Takes place after the events of Front Mission and Front Mission 4, and is set in June 2102.; Included in the Front Mission History (PlayStation, 2003) collection.
Front Mission 3 Original release dates: JP: September 2, 1999; NA: March 22, 2000; PAL: August 11, 2000	Release years by system: 1999 – PlayStation
Front Mission 3 Original release dates: JP: September 2, 1999; NA: March 22, 2000; PAL: August 11, 2000	Notes: Takes place after the events of Front Mission 2, and is set in October 2112.; First game of the series to be released in North America and Europe.; Included in the Front Mission History (PlayStation, 2003) collection.
Front Mission 4 Original release dates: JP: December 18, 2003; NA: June 15, 2004	Release years by system: 2003 – PlayStation 2
Front Mission 4 Original release dates: JP: December 18, 2003; NA: June 15, 2004	Notes: Takes place after the events of Front Mission, and is set in 2096.
Front Mission 2089 Original release date: JP: March 7, 2005	Release years by system: 2005 – Mobile phones 2008 – Mobile phones 2008 – Nintendo DS (Front Mission 2089: Border of Madness)
Front Mission 2089 Original release date: JP: March 7, 2005	Notes: Released on NTT DoCoMo i-mode mobile phones, au mobile phones, and SoftBank Yahoo! mobile phones in Japan.; Nintendo DS version is an enhanced remake of the game, with new visuals and maps.; Leads up to the events seen in Front Mission 2089-II, and is set in 2089.
Front Mission 5: Scars of the War Original release date: JP: December 29, 2005	Release years by system: 2005 – PlayStation 2
Front Mission 5: Scars of the War Original release date: JP: December 29, 2005	Notes: Encompasses and concludes the entire serialized storyline; it takes place from 2070 to 2121.
Front Mission 2089-II Original release date: JP: September 15, 2006	Release years by system: 2006 – Mobile phones 2008 – Mobile phones
Front Mission 2089-II Original release date: JP: September 15, 2006	Notes: Released on NTT DoCoMo i-mode mobile phones and au EZweb mobile phones in Japan.; A direct continuation of the storyline from Front Mission 2089; it leads up to the events seen in Front Mission, and is set in 2089.

=== Spin-offs ===
Spin-off games
Game	Details
Front Mission: Gun Hazard Original release date: JP: February 23, 1996	Release years by system: 1996 – Super Famicom
Front Mission: Gun Hazard Original release date: JP: February 23, 1996	Notes: A side-scrolling shooter spin-off game.; Takes place in an alternate Front Mission universe, and is set in 2064.
Front Mission Alternative Original release date: JP: December 18, 1997	Release years by system: 1997 – PlayStation
Front Mission Alternative Original release date: JP: December 18, 1997	Notes: A real-time strategy spin-off game.; A prequel to the Front Mission storyline, and is set in 2034.
Front Mission: Online Original release date: JP: May 12, 2005	Release years by system: 2005 – PlayStation 2, Microsoft Windows
Front Mission: Online Original release date: JP: May 12, 2005	Notes: A massively multiplayer online, first-person shooter spin-off game.; Support for Front Mission Online was discontinued on May 31, 2008.; Takes place during the events of Front Mission, and is set in 2090.
Front Mission Evolved Original release dates: JP: September 16, 2010; NA: September 28, 2010; PAL: October 8, 2010	Release years by system: 2010 – Microsoft Windows, PlayStation 3, Xbox 360
Front Mission Evolved Original release dates: JP: September 16, 2010; NA: September 28, 2010; PAL: October 8, 2010	Notes: A third-person shooter spin-off game.; A story reboot taking place farther than all other entries, and set in 2171.
Left Alive Original release dates: JP: February 28, 2019; WW: March 5, 2019	Release years by system: 2019 – Microsoft Windows, PlayStation 4
Left Alive Original release dates: JP: February 28, 2019; WW: March 5, 2019	Notes: A third-person shooter spin-off game.; Takes place in 2127, 6 years after the events of Front Mission 5: Scars of the War and 44 years before Front Mission Evolved.

=== Compilations ===
Compilations
Game	Details
Front Mission History Original release date: JP: December 11, 2003	Release years by system: 2003 – PlayStation
Front Mission History Original release date: JP: December 11, 2003	Notes: A compilation of Front Mission 1st, Front Mission 2 and Front Mission 3.

== Other media ==
=== Manga and novels ===
Manga and novels
Game	Details
Front Mission Zero^{JP} July 9, 1994 – Manga	Notes: A three-volume manga series co-written by Toshiro Tsuchida and Hideo Iwasaki, and co-published by FamiComics and ASCII Comix.; Precedes all Front Mission video games (excluding Front Mission Alternative) and begins the serialized storyline, being set in 2070.; The series revolves around a cast of characters who are later formally introduced in the video games through Front Mission 5: Scars of the War.; Volume 1 – July 9, 1994 (FamiComics Special Edition, Summer 1994); Volume 2 – November 11, 1994 (FamiComics Special Edition, Winter 1994); Volume 3 – February 3, 1995 (FamiComics Special Edition, Spring 1995)
Front Mission Comics^{JP} July 22, 1995 – Manga	Notes: A one-volume manga series written by Taishu Matsuda and published by ASCII Comix.; An expanded universe supplement to Front Mission, set in January 2090.
Front Mission – Front Line Report^{JP} July 22, 1995 – Novel	Notes: A novel co-written by Fumihiko Iino and Hideo Iwasaki, and co-published by LOGOUT Paperback Adventures and Aspect Novels.; An expanded universe supplement to Front Mission, set in 2090.
Gun Hazard – A Mercenary's Iron Legs^{JP} June 7, 1996 – Novel	Notes: A novel written by Hiroshi Yamaguchi and published by Aspect Novels.; An expanded universe supplement to Front Mission Series: Gun Hazard, set in January 2064.
Front Mission Series: Gun Hazard^{JP} November 22, 1996 – Manga	Notes: A one-volume manga series written by Taishu Matsuda and published by ASCII Comix.; An expanded universe supplement to Front Mission Series: Gun Hazard, set in 2060.
Front Mission 2 Guidebook ~Wanzers of the Elite~^{JP} January 5, 1998 – Manga	Notes: A strategy guide published by ASCII that contains a manga section written by Hideo Iwasaki.; An expanded universe supplement to Front Mission 2, set in 2098.
Front Mission 4 – Elsa^{JP} September 24, 2004 – Novel	Notes: A two-volume novel series written by Toru Akitsu and published by GAME NOVELS.; Expanded universe supplements to Front Mission 4, set in 2095.; Volume 1 – September 24, 2004; Volume 2 – September 24, 2004
Front Mission ~The Drive~^{JP} April 25, 2007 – Manga	Notes: A one-volume manga series written by Yasuo Otagaki and published by Young Gangan.; An expanded universe supplement to Front Mission 2089-II, set in August 2090.
Front Mission Dog Life & Dog Style^{JP} November 25, 2007^{KR} September 8, 2010^{FR} January 26, 2012 – Manga	Notes: A ten-volume manga series written by Yasuo Otagaki and published by Young Gangan.; An original series that takes place during the timeline of Front Mission, set in June 2090.; Volume 1 – Japan: November 25, 2007; South Korea: September 8, 2010; France: January 26, 2012; Volume 2 – Japan: June 25, 2008; South Korea: October 15, 2010; France: March 8, 2012; Volume 3 – Japan: December 25, 2008; South Korea: December 10, 2010; France: May 10, 2012; Volume 4 – Japan: August 25, 2009; South Korea: February 8, 2011; France: August 23, 2012; Volume 5 – Japan: February 25, 2010; South Korea: March 11, 2011; France: October 11, 2012; Volume 6 – Japan: September 25, 2010; South Korea: April 27, 2011; France: December 13, 2012; Volume 7 – Japan: June 25, 2011; South Korea: January 4, 2012; France: February 14, 2013; Volume 8 – Japan: December 24, 2011; South Korea: July 20, 2012; France: April 11, 2013; Volume 9 – Japan: June 25, 2012; South Korea: November 13, 2012; France: June 13, 2013; Volume 10 – Japan: October 30, 2012; South Korea: January 25, 2013; France: August 22, 2013

=== Commercials ===
Commercials
Game	Details
Front Mission^{JP} December 20, 1994 – Film	Notes: A live-action commercial directed by Yoshihiko Dai and starring Tina Coté and Christopher Dawes.; Filmed in Fillmore, California and Nevada.; An expanded universe supplement to Front Mission, set in 2091.
Front Mission Series: Gun Hazard^{JP} October 21, 1995 – Film	Notes: A live-action commercial directed by Yoshihiko Dai and starring Dax Griffin and Danielle Keaton.; Filmed in Santa Monica, California and Tonopah, Nevada.; An expanded universe supplement to Front Mission Series: Gun Hazard, set in 2064.

=== Radio dramas ===
Radio dramas
Game	Details
Front Mission Series: Gun Hazard^{JP} October 30, 1995 – Radio drama	Notes: A ten-episode radio drama directed by Hiroshi Yamaguchi and starring Banjō Ginga and Hiromi Tsuru.; An expanded universe supplement to Front Mission Series: Gun Hazard, set in January 2064.; Aired from October 30, 1995 to December 28, 1995.

=== Toys ===
The Front Mission series has spawned a number of action figures and model kits. In 1997, with the release of Front Mission 2, Kotobukiya released three resin kits depicting certain wanzers (mecha) from the game, such as the Zenith V. In 1999, Kotobukiya's ARTFX team produced a line of six-inch action figures depicting wanzers seen in Front Mission 3 such as the Zenith RV. Toy distributor Palisades released these figures In North America in 2000, and they were later reissued in different colors.

In September 2004, after the release of Front Mission 4, Kotobukiya collaborated with Square Enix to release the Front Mission Trading Arts series, a line of highly realistic three-inch blind-box figures of wanzers. The Front Mission History collection also had their own small figures. The first wave of Trading Arts figures comprised wanzers from Front Mission and Front Mission 4, which was re-released as Front Mission Trading Arts Plus Stage I in February 2005. One wanzer each from Front Mission 1st through Scars of the War was featured in Front Mission Trading Arts Plus Stage II, which was released in February 2006. Glen Duval's Kyojun wanzer from Stage II was a pre-order reward for Front Mission 5. Re-releases of this line featured wanzers in army green, matte, or metallic colors. Square Enix also released figures from Front Mission Evolved as part of its Play Arts Kai line, which include the Zenith, Enyo, and Zephyr.

=== Books ===
The Front Mission series has produced a number of strategy guides and related books for their respective video games. Notable books released from the series include an artbook titled "Silence" The Art of Front Mission 1995-2003 and a reference book titled Front Mission World Historica: Report of Conflicts 1970-2121. The "Silence" artbook showcases conceptual artwork drawn by Yoshitaka Amano for Front Mission, Front Mission: Gun Hazard, and the Front Mission First remake. The "World Historica" reference book covers all relevant data in the main series universe, from before the events of Front Mission Alternative to the end of Front Mission 5: Scars of the War. Front Mission: Gun Hazard and Front Mission Evolved are not covered in the reference book.

=== Music albums ===
Music albums
Title	Release date	Length	Label
Front Mission Original Sound Version	February 25, 1995	1:08:17	NTT Publishing
Front Mission Series: Gun Hazard Original Soundtrack	February 25, 1996	2:30:25	NTT Publishing
Front Mission 2 Original Soundtrack	September 21, 1997	1:15:45	DigiCube
Front Mission Alternative Vinyl	July 1997	35:06	DigiCube
Front Mission Alternative Original Soundtrack	November 21, 1997	1:12:39	DigiCube
Front Mission 3 Original Soundtrack	September 22, 1999	2:30:00	DigiCube
Front Mission 1st Special BGM Selection	May 10, 2004	18:25	Square Enix
Front Mission 4 plus 1st Original Soundtrack	May 10, 2004	3:24:24	Square Enix
Front Mission 5: Scars of the War Original Soundtrack	January 25, 2006	2:43:07	Square Enix
Front Mission: Online Original Soundtrack	September 20, 2006	1:13:19	Square Enix
Front Mission Evolved Original Soundtrack/Mission 01 to 05	September 30, 2010	23:47	Square Enix
