= Front Mission 4 =

2003 video game

- North American cover art
- Developer: Square Enix Product Development Division 6
- Publisher: Square Enix
- Director: Toshiro Tsuchida
- Producer: Toshiro Tsuchida
- Artist: Yusuke Naora
- Composers: Hidenori Iwasaki; Ryo Yamazaki
- Series: Front Mission
- Platform: PlayStation 2
- Release: JP: December 18, 2003; NA: June 15, 2004
- Genre: Tactical role-playing
- Mode: Single-player

Front Mission 4, also known in Japan as Front Mission Fourth, (Note: Japanese: フロントミッション フォース, Hepburn: Furonto Misshon Fuoosu) is a tactical role-playing game developed and published by Square Enix for the PlayStation 2. It is the fourth main installment of the Front Mission series. Like other Front Mission titles, Front Mission 4 is part of a serialized storyline that follows the stories of various characters and their struggles involving mecha known as wanzers.

The game takes place in 2096, 6 years before the events of Front Mission 2. Superstates compete for the world's resources, and two individuals are sent to investigate when five bases of one nation are attacked unprovoked by persons unknown. The game was developed to sound different musically than previous titles, with South American instruments like the pan flute were used to compose a more dynamic musical structure.

The title was the top selling game of Christmas 2003 in Japan and sold over 160,000 copies. It received generally positive reviews, highlighting the high production values and customization of mechs for combat, but also cited the game's high level of difficulty and complexity.

== Gameplay ==
Front Mission 4 borrows several of the gameplay mechanics found in Front Mission 2. The video game progresses in a linear manner: watch cut-scene events, complete missions, set up their wanzers during intermissions, and sortie for the next mission. The player travels to locations on a world map. As the player progresses through the plot, new locations are revealed on the world map. Towns and cities act as intermission points where the player can organize and set up their units for the upcoming mission. Battle zones are where the missions take place, though they become inaccessible upon the completion of a mission. Like in Front Mission 2, Front Mission 4 alternates control between the game's two main characters.

The missions in FM4 are traditional tactical RPG fare, ranging from destroying all enemy targets to protecting a certain allied target. There are a number of returning features from Front Mission 2 that are used for mission play, namely Action Points (AP) and Links. Action Points (AP) is a feature that dictates how much actions can be done with each unit. Actions such as moving and attacking require a certain amount of AP to use. At the end of a full turn, which is one Player Phase and Enemy Phase, a set amount of AP is replenished. A unit's AP amount and recharge value depends on how many AP-specific abilities its pilot has learned.

Links is a feature that allows multiple units to provide offensive and defensive support to each other during battles. Unlike in Front Mission 2 and Front Mission 3, players have greater control over Links. Up to four units can be linked together to form one "link"; an offensive link for Player Phase battles, and a defensive link for Enemy Phase battles. Additionally, the player can dictate the degree of support a unit can provide; a linked unit can use battle skills or no battle skills at all. For linked actions, a weapon must be set in order to participate in an offensive or defensive linked battle. Lastly, two special actions can also be set as linked actions: Antilock and Salvage from EMP and radio backpacks, respectively. Antilock causes missiles within range to miss, while Salvage restores any wanzers destroyed in battle.

Returning features aside, Front Mission 4 has a number of new gameplay mechanics. Weapons are now capable of attacking more than once during any battle, provided that the unit initiating the attack has sufficient AP and weapon ammunition. The time of day affects a weapon's chances of hitting its target; for example, accuracy is lowered during night time. Weather conditions affect the effective range of weapons; for example, a blizzard will reduce a machine gun's maximum firing range by one square. Like in Front Mission Alternative, there are new auxiliary backpacks that offer unique features when used on the battlefield. In addition to the item, turbo, and repair backpacks, players can now use jetpacks, sensor backpacks, EMP backpacks, and radio backpacks.

Sensor backpacks are equipped with sonar and radar sensors that extend the firing range of missile launchers. EMP backpacks are armed with electromagnetic pulse (EMP) waves that disable various functions on its target. Jetpacks have built-in verniers that allow a wanzer to scale buildings and directly bypass obstacles such as water. Radio backpacks have communications equipment that allows a wanzer to act as a forward air controller by signaling a transport to drop supplies, armor coating, or call in an air strike. Aside from these new additions, turbo backpacks now come with a small amount of item space and repair backpacks can remove EMP-inflicted status damage.

== Plot ==
Front Mission 4 is set in 2096, taking place in between the events of Front Mission 1st and Front Mission 2. The story takes place in Venezuela and Europe. Since the revelations of the true causes behind the 2nd Huffman Conflict in 2092, (Note: Portrayed in Front Mission (1995)) the world grew wary of the Republic of Zaftra. Zaftra began losing foreign investments and many businesses withdrew from the union, resulting in major economic losses. Superpowers such as the United States of the New Continent (USN) (Note: Named exclusively in the North American release as the Unified Continental States (UCS)) refused offers from the union to import their natural resources, the major economic driver of their economy. With a failing economy and growing distrust from the world community, the Republic of Zaftra disbanded the Peace Mediation Organization (PMO) in 2094. Meanwhile, the discovery of natural resources in Poland led the European Community (EC) to stop importing raw materials from Zaftra. Consequently, Zaftran citizens began migrating to other countries in search for work. In 2096, the Republic of Zaftra returned to the spotlight after a mysterious blitzkrieg of EC military bases leaves Europe in an imminent resource crisis. Elsewhere in the world, Venezuela suddenly declares independence from the USN.

The plot of Front Mission 4 revolves around two individuals - Durandal recruit Elsa Eliane and USN sergeant Darril Traubel. In 2096, five military bases in Germany are simultaneously attacked by unknown assailants. The EC leadership discuss the attacks and appoint the union's Durandal military research unit to lead the probe. While probing for evidence at a Bundeswehr base, they encounter Rolf Wagner, the leader of the Bundeswehr's elite Blauer Nebel special forces unit. The Durandal theorize that the attackers staged out of a small base in Denmark and run into some opposition there, but another set of wanzers ambush the Durandal after they return to Germany with their findings, which includes a wanzer AI microchip. The team delivers the microchip to Niklas Glaeser, a German general leading the investigation. In a news conference, Glaeser's revelations that the attackers were USN puzzle the Durandal, who believe they were of Zaftran origin.

Meanwhile, Venezuela suddenly secedes from the USN. In response, the USN sends in the 332nd Mobile Company to force them back into the fold. Darril Traubel and his two of friends are on patrol duty when they witness a Venezuelan State Army (VSA) transport crash in the jungle. Inspecting the remains, they find a crate carrying gold bullion worth $25 million. The three then decide to steal the gold and go AWOL. However, they are discovered by the VSA and are forced to escape north to Cumana, where a Chinese businessman named Chang offers to help them escape. However, this fails when they are attacked by unknown wanzers at the harbor, which spills over into the city. Darril captures their leader, Anizka Ivanovna Aleksandrov, and they head for another escape route. Along the way, the deserters find a village being attacked by the VSA. Darril decides to help the villagers and in the process, meets the Alianza de Libertad Venezolana (Venezuelan Liberation Alliance) rebel group. Ivanovna escapes during the skirmish, but keeps a homing beacon on the deserters' truck believing they may be of use to her in the future. As the game's plot thickens, the protagonists discover that Glaeser lied about the investigation and pieces its connections between the base attacks in Germany and the deserters' pursuers in Venezuela.

=== Characters ===
Many characters from Front Mission 4 are referenced in Front Mission 5: Scars of the War. The video game takes place in 2096.

- Elsa Eliane is a former E.C. French Army master sergeant and a member of the E.C. Armored Tactics Research Corps, otherwise known as the Durandal. Before joining the Durandal, Elsa was in the employ of the French Army and served them for three years from 2093 to 2096. Although Eliane had no actual combat experience with the military, her grasp of combat theory and wanzer piloting impressed her superior officers. As a result, Elsa was accepted into the Durandal upon the recommendation of her superiors. Elsa is also referenced in Front Mission 5: Scars of the War.
- Darril Traubel is a U.S.N. sergeant and a platoon leader for the U.S.N. Army 332nd Mobile Company. A talented soldier, Darril's achievements on the battlefield made him into a rising star in the U.S.N. Army. However, his sense of justice has led him to disregard orders and eventually, his demotion from captain to sergeant in 2096. Ever since the demotion, Traubel has become a disillusioned soldier and has lost interest in fighting for the U.S.N. Darril also makes appearances in Front Mission First and Front Mission 5: Scars of the War as a playable character.
- Billy Renges is a U.S.N. corporal in the employ of the 332nd Mobile Company. Billy was born into a poor family struggling to make ends meet. Determined to escape a life of poverty, he enlisted in the U.S.N. Army to live the good life. Renges met and befriended Darril Traubel during the 2nd Huffman Conflict, and the two have formed a strong friendship since then. When Darril was reassigned to the 332nd Mobile Company, he applied for a transfer to the company to serve with his best friend. Billy also makes an appearance in Front Mission First, and is referenced in Front Mission 5: Scars of the War.
- Bruno Diaz is the governor of the U.S.N. state, Venezuela. As a puppet leader following the orders of the U.S.N. Central Government, Bruno had extensive connections to the mafia and foreign sources. He used these sources to oppress the Venezuelan people and made himself wealthy by robbing them of their money. Diaz, however, desired to break away from the U.S.N. and accepted military support from an unknown foreign source to make it happen. Bruno is also referenced in Front Mission 5: Scars of the War.
- Luis Perez is the leader of the la Alianza de Libertad Venezolana (Venezuelan Freedom Alliance). Growing up in poor living conditions, Luis aspired to change Venezuela for the better as a child. At the age of 15, he joined la Alianza as a soldier, but assumes leadership five years after the group's head dies. Luis opposes Governor Bruno Diaz's rule and wants better treatment of his people from the U.S.N. Central Government. Luis is also referenced in Front Mission 5: Scars of the War.
- Phillip Chaeffer is a U.S.N. private first class serving the 332nd Mobile Company. Phillip enlisted in the U.S.N. Army during the 2nd Huffman Conflict and served as an infantryman in the war. Sometime during the war, he starts a friendship with Darril Traubel and Billy Renges. As the youngest and most inexperienced of the three men, Chaeffer has a tendency to act recklessly and attract unwanted attention from enemy forces. Phillip is also referenced in Front Mission First.
- William Clift is the president of the U.S.N. Central Government. As president of the U.S.N., William made resolving domestic and international conflicts the focus of his presidency during the 2090s. His administration was heavily involved in the Venezuelan coup d'état and the Indochina Conflict. William is also referenced in Front Mission 5: Scars of the War.

== Development ==
On August 6, 2003, Square Enix revealed plans to develop a new entry in the Front Mission series. In December 2003, Square Enix showed a video of the game alongside Front Mission Online at Jump Fest. In February 2004, Square Enix announced a June release for North America. In March 2004, registered users of PlayOnline were given a free demo of the game. The game was shown at E3 in May 2004, with the game's director Toshiro Tsuchida explaining the plot and new features. The game is fully voiced in English, even in the Japanese version. The North American release of the game featured some cosmetic changes, such as changing the USN name to the UCS and the German Maltese cross roundel on the Bundeswehr units were changed to a simple black "X" emblem.

== Soundtrack ==
The soundtrack was composed by Hidenori Iwasaki, with some tracks contributed by Ryo Yamazaki. The game was Iwasaki's first as a composer, as he had previously only worked as a synthesizer programmer. The music has been described as very different from the "very abstract and heavy" music of the previous game, and much more similar to the music of the first game with an emphasis on melody as well as light and thematic elements. The soundtrack also incorporates "South American"-style elements, with the use of pan flutes and tribal percussion. The music from the game was bundled with music from the remake of the first, Front Mission 1st, and the album was titled Front Mission 4 plus 1st Original Soundtrack. It was released by Square Enix on May 10, 2004. The four-disc album has two discs devoted to each game, and has 97 tracks. It is 3:24:24 long, and has catalog numbers of SQEX-10021~4. The album was well received by Ben Schweitzer of RPGFan. Preferring the Front Mission 4 tracks to the 1st tracks, he complimented the album as "impressive", especially given that it was the "first work of a promising new composer". While he did not feel that all of the tracks were of consistent quality, he said that none of them were "bad" and that the more "atmospheric" tracks stood out as particularly noteworthy. Reviewers from Square Enix Music Online had similar praises and criticisms, calling it "not the most diverse or consistent of Front Mission scores" but still "highly worthy"; they also noted the atmospheric tracks as worthy of note.

== Reception ==
Reception

Aggregate scores
Aggregator	Score
GameRankings	76%
Metacritic	75/100

Review scores
Publication	Score
Electronic Gaming Monthly	8/10
Famitsu	32/40
Game Informer	7.25/10
GamePro	4/5
GameSpot	7/10
GameSpy	3/5
IGN	6.8/10
Official U.S. PlayStation Magazine	4/5
PlayStation: The Official Magazine	8/10

Front Mission 4 sold 169,606 copies in Japan by the end of 2003. Additionally, it was the top-selling game during the week of Christmas in Japan. It was re-released alongside other titles in the series in Square Enix's Ultimate Hits line on May 11, 2006. Around the time of the Ultimate Hits re-release, Front Mission 4 sold over 260,000 copies in Japan.

Front Mission 4 holds a 75% on both GameRankings and Metacritic. North American reaction to the game was consistent across the board, receiving mixed to generally good reviews. It was praised for its deep gameplay, customizable wanzers, and high production values. On the disapproving side, many felt the plot advanced at a sluggish pace, the AI was subpar, and the menu system was cumbersome at times. At least 4 of the critics below mentioned the high complexity of the game would be a benefit or a fault of the game depending on the player. Official PlayStation Magazine summed it up with, "Outside of the Romance of the Three Kingdoms series, nothing surpasses the complexity of FM4." The critic consensus seemed to be that fans of mecha or strategy RPG games would be pleased with Front Mission 4 and that the general audience should rent it first. Another complaint heard (particularly with Game Informer) is that the first few battles alternate between tedious and annoying.
