= Front Mission 5: Scars of the War =

2005 video game

- Developer: Square Enix
- Publisher: Square Enix
- Director: Shintaro Tamai
- Producer: Toshiro Tsuchida
- Artist: Yusuke Naora
- Composer: Hidenori Iwasaki
- Series: Front Mission
- Platform: PlayStation 2
- Release: JP: December 29, 2005
- Genre: Tactical role-playing
- Mode: Single-player

Front Mission 5: Scars of the War (also known as Front Mission Fifth: Scars of the War (Note: Japanese: フロントミッション フィフス 〜スカーズ・オブ・ザ・ウォー〜, Hepburn: Furonto Misshon Fifusu 〜Sukāzu obu za Uō〜)) is a 2005 tactical role-playing game by Square Enix. Front Mission 5 is the sixth main entry and ninth entry overall in the Front Mission series. Front Mission 5 is part of a serialized storyline that follows the stories of various characters and their struggles involving mecha known as wanzers. An English fan translation was released in 2009.

== Gameplay ==
Front Mission 5: Scars of the War borrows much of the core gameplay mechanics found in Front Mission 2, as well as a plethora of features from other Front Mission entries. The game progresses in a linear manner: watch cut-scene events, complete missions, set up their wanzers during intermissions, and sortie for the next mission. Military bases and supply camps act as intermission points where the player can organize and set up their units for the upcoming mission.

Missions in Scars of the War are traditional tactical RPG fare, ranging from destroying all enemy targets to protecting a certain allied target. There are a number of returning features from Front Mission 2 that are used for mission play, namely Action Points (AP) and Links. Action Points (AP) is a feature that dictates how much actions can be done with each unit. Actions such as moving and attacking require a certain amount of AP to use. At the end of a full turn, which is one Player Phase and Enemy Phase, a set amount of AP is replenished. A unit's AP amount and recharge value depends on its pilot's proficiency levels; the higher it is, the greater the amount of AP that can be used and replenished.

Links is a feature that allows multiple units to provide offensive and defensive support to each other during battles. Scars of the War streamlines this feature by allowing up to six units to form one "link" for Player Phase and Enemy Phase battles. As long as a unit's pilot has a Link-class skill and the appropriate weapons equipped, they can participate in linked battles. Incorporated into the Links feature is pilot types; this dictates the linked actions that a unit can do during combat. For example, an aggressive pilot will attack with complete disregard for friendly fire situations and AP. Likewise, a defensive pilot will avoid causing friendly fire, but will disregard this concern if they have used repairs on an allied unit in the line of fire.

Returning features aside, Scars of the War has a number of new gameplay mechanics, the most notable being friendly fire. Unlike other Front Mission titles, any units in a weapon's line of fire will be subject to being hit by its rounds. Each weapon class has a distinct firing path; for example, shotgun rounds spread in mid-flight and can hit units away from its firing path. Another new addition is part skills; parts can be equipped with special features that grant them unique properties. For example, rifles can shoot through multiple targets in its line of fire with the part skill "Piercing". Auxiliary backpacks from Front Mission 4 that make a return include: item, turbo, repair, jetpack, sensor, and EMP backpacks. Several of the auxiliary backpacks have new functions: item backpacks come with a small increase in power output, sensor backpacks can use EMP, and EMP backpacks can add armor coats or repair damaged parts.

Outside of battles, Scars of the War also boasts a New Game + option as well as a Hard Mode difficulty setting. Other returning features from other Front Mission entries include: Arena, Battle Simulator, briefings, mission branching, and remodeling. Other new features to Scars of the War include: part sorting, scouting, Survival Simulator, and Theater Mode.

- Arena is a feature where the player can field a number of pilots to battle Arena combatants, controlled by AI, for monetary rewards (Command Points, or CP). The player can also battle characters from past Front Mission entries.
- Briefings are shown to aid the player about mission conditions, special notes, and special enemies. Pictures, streaming data, and the ability to review the mission area are used to illustrate these details.
- Battle Simulator is a VR simulator where the player can improve the combat proficiencies of their pilots. These simulators can be taken and repeated at any given time.
- Mission branching is an option that allows the player to choose what type of mission they can play next. This feature is seen several times in the game.
- Parts and weapons that are purchased can be upgraded through remodeling. New to remodeling in this game is part optimization; when using Remodel Points (RP), a part can transform into one of many derivative versions from its part set.
- Parts, auxiliary backpacks, weapons, and items can be arranged in a number of ways through part sorting.
- Scouting allows the player to recruit extra pilots to their platoon. The range of pilots that can be recruited increases as the game progresses. Over 80 pilots can be scouted, with a maximum of 12 pilots being used at any given time.
- Survival Simulator is a simulator where the player goes through a set number of floors with one pilot. Upon completing the simulator or finding the item "Escape Code", the player can end the simulation and bring items found in the floors back to the main game. Any leftover item space is converted into RP.
- In Theater Mode, the player can view event cut-scenes that have taken place based on when the save file was made. Players can also change their wanzer setups at any given time.

== Story ==
Unlike all other Front Mission titles, the story of Scars of the War uses a very different approach. Set over the course of five decades starting from 2070, the game encapsulates and concludes the entire serialized storyline. All unresolved plot elements from past Front Mission entries are finally brought to their conclusion as the story unfolds. However, because of this storytelling approach, only players who have played all of the previous entries can fully understand the game's story. These entries are: Front Mission 2089, Front Mission 2089-II, Front Mission: Online, Front Mission, Front Mission 2, Front Mission 3, and Front Mission 4. Additionally, there are several story elements from Front Mission Alternative that are also resolved in the game.

Globalization sweeps the world in the early 21st century. Facing a recession and other worldwide crises, many nations set aside their differences and form supranational unions. The European Union, formed in 1993, was renamed the European Community (EC) in 2005 when all nations of Europe joined the bloc. In 2015, the Commonwealth of Independent States unites to form the Republic of Zaftra. In 2020, the countries of North America and South America band together to create the United States of the New Continent (USN). The nations of Southeast Asia, Australia, and Oceania form the Oceania Cooperative Union in 2026. The countries of Africa unite under the Organization of African Consolidation in 2030. Nation-states became a relic of the past as fewer countries are willing to face the world's crises alone. As a result, conflicts are less frequent, economies prosper, the quality of life improves, and peace in long-troubled regions are finally achieved. However, this dream does not last long as new conflicts show the world that mankind never learns from its mistakes.

=== Plot ===
The plot of Scars of the War revolves around USN soldier Walter Feng. When Huffman Island is deemed ready for colonization by the United Nations in 2065, Feng becomes one of the island's first immigrants. Living in Freedom City, Walter befriends two other children - Randy O'Neill and Glen Duval. The three boys experience first-hand the realities of war during the outbreak of the 1st Huffman Conflict in 2070; Walter and Glen are physically scarred by shell casings during a battle in Freedom City. The three boys were separated at the end of the war when the USN forcefully repatriates Walter and Randy, and Glen is forcefully repatriated by the OCU. The three reunites during a peacekeeping operation as soldiers for their respective armies during the Huffman Crisis in 2086. Upon seeing Glen pilot a wanzer, Walter and Randy sign up for the USN Army's wanzer training program. As tensions between the OCU and USN elevate to a new high from the Larcus Incident, the two men qualify as wanzer pilots.

However, on the same day they qualify, Walter and Randy are sent off to fight in the 2nd Huffman Conflict. During the invasion of Freedom City, they encounter Glen in the suburbs of city and defeat him. Feng and O'Neill visit Duval before he is shipped off to a POW camp. A year later, the three face off again on the battlefield - this time, Glen easily defeats his friends. However, instead of showing mercy, Glen kills Randy inside his cockpit block. A ceasefire between the OCU and the USN is declared shortly after he escapes. Traumatized by the experience, Walter cleans up Randy's quarters in an attempt to move on with life. Seeing an application form for the Strike Wyverns assault unit, Feng signs the form and undergoes intensive training. He passes the test and joins the unit, where he meets his old friend Edward Collins and new commanding officer Lynn Wenright (who happens to be his childhood sweetheart).

Over the next few years, Walter participated in numerous military operations involving the USN—ranging from conflicts over natural resources in the Caspian Sea to the independence movement in the OCU. Amid these events, a mysterious terrorist organization called “Grimnir” emerged, linked to his best friend who had gone missing. This is a terrorist organization whose motives remain entirely shrouded in mystery.

== Development ==
Front Mission 5 was first announced in a press conference at the Tokyo Game Show in September 2004. The game was developed by Square Enix's sixth production team, under the direction of the series' creator Toshiro Tsuchida. The team is the same that worked on Front Mission 4, albeit with new members. The developers intended for Front Mission 5 to have a more cinematic focus than previous installments — the game was the series' first foray into cut scene-based storytelling.

The game was showcased in non-playable form at the Tokyo Game Show of September 2005. A postcard exchangeable for a limited-edition Trading Arts figure - Glen's Kyojun wanzer - was included as a bonus for pre-ordering the game. It was showcased in playable form at the Jump Festa in 2006. A strategy guide for the game was published by Enterbrain on March 18, 2006.

== Music ==
The soundtrack for Front Mission 5: Scars of the War, which is the longest in the series, was primarily composed by Hidenori Iwasaki, with contributions from Kenichiro Fukui and one track written by Iwasaki's synth operator Yasuhiro Yamanaka. The commercial song "Blue Stream" was composed by Masayoshi Soken.

== Reception and legacy ==
Reception

Review scores
| Publication | Score |
|---|---|
| Famitsu | 32 out of 40 |
| Hyper | 7 out of 10 |
| Consoles+ | 85% |
| Dengeki PlayStation | 90/85/80/80 out of 100, 84% |
| GameBrink | 8.8 out of 10, 88% |
| Joypad | 9 out of 10, 90% |
| OteraGame | 8 out of 10, 80% |

Award
| Publication | Award |
|---|---|
| | "Import RPG of the Year" (RPGFan, "Games of 2006") |

In its first week of sales in Japan, Front Mission 5: Scars of War sold 146,209 units. By the middle of January 2006, Scars of the War had sold over 200,000 units and moved enough sales for the Front Mission series to surpass 3 million cumulative sales worldwide. The game was later released under Ultimate Hits line, suggesting the game did well as products in the line have sold 250,000 units or more.

In RPG Fan's Games of 2006 feature, the reasons for it being the Import RPG of the Year make note of the game's improvements and excellent execution in design and functionality. The game was also voted the runner-up Strategy RPG of the Year by RPG Fan in their "Games of 2006" awards.

While the developers acknowledge the good reception of the cinematic focus of the game, they noted that later entries in the series would not necessarily follow the same direction. Elements from Scars of the War, such as the character Glen Duval, were featured in the 2007 port of Front Mission First for the Nintendo DS.
