= FM4 (disambiguation) =

FM4 is an Austrian national radio station.

FM4 may also refer to:

- Farm to Market Road 4, in Texas
- Front Mission 4, a video game
- Forza Motorsport 4, a racing video game
