= Toshiro Tsuchida =

Japanese game director and producer (born 1964)

Toshiro Tsuchida (土田 俊郎, Tsuchida Toshirō) (born 1964) is a Japanese game director and game producer. He currently works for Japanese Social Game company GREE. He formerly worked for Square Enix Co., Ltd. (formerly Square Co., Ltd.). He is most notably credited for creating the Front Mission and Arc the Lad media franchises.

== Biography ==
=== Masaya and G-Craft ===
Tsuchida worked for Japanese development studios Masaya and G-Craft, the latter of which he founded in 1993 after leaving Masaya. During the development of Front Mission 2 and Front Mission Alternative, Square initiated talks with Tsuchida in an attempt to purchase G-Craft in 1997. As the buyout occurred during Front Mission 2's development, it became the last title with G-Craft credited as the developer.

=== Square Enix ===
Tsuchida was also the battle director for both Final Fantasy X and Final Fantasy XIII. As battle director of Final Fantasy X, he changed the recurring battle system in the series. Whereas Hiroyuki Ito had created the Active Time Battle system in Final Fantasy IV, Tsuchida would create the Conditional Turn-Based Battle system to make things more strategic. He kept Final Fantasy IV in mind when working on Final Fantasy X. Tsuchida was the head of Product Development Division-6 within Square Enix.

He produced Final Fantasy Crystal Chronicles: My Life as a King, and stated that Square Enix was excited to be the first ones to bring a new game to Wiiware game platform. The game concept was to take the role of the king, not the hero, and the Crystal Chronicles series has a large amount of character interactions. Game development began before the WiiWare tools were distributed. Developing Final Fantasy Crystal Chronicles: My Life as a King required a change from the typical way the Square Enix developed games, switching from starting with the graphics and to beginning with gameplay.

He has recently worked on Final Fantasy XIII as the battle planning director in 2010. Tsuchida left Square Enix on February 28, 2011.

=== GREE ===
He works in a department working with developers to create new video games.

=== Return to Sony ===
In 2016, he returned to work with Sony's ForwardWorks to develop a mobile Arc The Lad reboot

== Games ==
=== Masaya ===
| Game | Released | System(s) | Credit(s) | Ref. |
|---|---|---|---|---|
| Sol Bianca | 1990 | TurboGrafx-CD | Visual Programmer | |
| Ranma ½ | 1990 | TurboGrafx-CD | Producer | |
| Head Buster | 1991 | Game Gear | Producer | |
| Kaizou Choujin Schbibinman 2: Arata Naru Teki | 1991 | TurboGrafx-16 | Producer | |
| Kaizō Chōjin Shubibinman 3: Ikai no Princess | 1992 | TurboGrafx-CD | Producer | |
| Ranma ½: Chōnai Gekitō Hen | 1992 | Super Nintendo Entertainment System | Producer | |
| Gley Lancer | 1992 | Sega Genesis | Producer | |
| Ranma ½: Datō, Ganso Musabetsu Kakutō-Ryū! | 1992 | TurboGrafx-CD | Producer | |
| Assault Suits Valken | 1992 | Super Nintendo Entertainment System | Producer | |
| Cho Aniki: Super Big Brothers | 1992 | TurboGrafx-CD | Producer | |
| Langrisser | 1993 | TurboGrafx-CD | Producer | |

=== G-Craft ===
| Game | Released | System(s) | Credit(s) | Ref. |
|---|---|---|---|---|
| Front Mission | 1995 | Super Nintendo Entertainment System | Producer, Scenario Writer | |
| Arc the Lad | 1995 | PlayStation | Producer | |
| Arc the Lad 2 | 1996 | PlayStation | Producer | |
| Arc the Lad: Monster Game with Casino Game | 1997 | PlayStation | Producer | |
| Front Mission 2nd | 1997 | PlayStation | Director | |

=== Square ===
| Game | Released | System(s) | Credit(s) | Ref. |
|---|---|---|---|---|
| Front Mission 3 | 1999 | PlayStation | Director | |
| Final Fantasy X | 2001 | PlayStation 2 | Battle Director | |
| Final Fantasy XI | 2002 | PlayStation 2 | Boss Monster AI | |

=== Square Enix ===
| Game | Released | System(s) | Credit(s) | Ref. |
|---|---|---|---|---|
| Front Mission | 2003 | PlayStation | Director, U.S.N. Scenario Writer | |
| Front Mission 4 | 2003 | PlayStation 2 | Director, Producer | |
| Front Mission: Online | 2005 | PlayStation 2, PC | Director, Producer | |
| Front Mission 5: Scars of the War | 2005 | PlayStation 2 | Producer | |
| Final Fantasy Crystal Chronicles: My Life as a King | 2008 | WiiWare | Producer | |
| Front Mission 2089: Border of Madness | 2008 | Nintendo DS | Supervisor | |
| Final Fantasy XIII | 2010 | PlayStation 3, Xbox 360 | Battle Planning Director | |
