= Fuzzbox (disambiguation) =

A fuzzbox is a device for deliberately introducing distortion in music.

Fuzzbox may also refer to:

- We've Got a Fuzzbox and We're Gonna Use It or Fuzzbox, a 1980s English pop-punk quartet
- "Fuzzbox", a song by Bomb the Bass, featuring vocals from Jon Spencer from their 2008 album Future Chaos
- FuzzBox, a video-game developer that developed Cyber Org
