= Front Mission Evolved =

2010 video game

- Developer: Double Helix Games
- Publisher: Square Enix
- Producer: Shinji Hashimoto
- Designer: David O. Hall
- Writers: Motomu Toriyama; Daisuke Watanabe
- Composer: Garry Schyman
- Series: Front Mission
- Platforms: PlayStation 3; Windows; Xbox 360
- Release: JP: September 16, 2010; NA: September 28, 2010; AU: October 7, 2010; EU: October 8, 2010
- Genres: Vehicle simulation, third-person shooter
- Modes: Single-player, multiplayer

Front Mission Evolved (Note: Japanese: フロントミッション エボルヴ, Hepburn: Furonto Misshon Eborubu) is a third-person shooter video game developed by Double Helix Games and published by Square Enix. Unlike previous Front Mission titles which have a tactical role-playing game structure, players engage in combat in real time on 3D maps using giant robotic weapons of war known as "Wanzers." The game also features a single player story mode and several multiplayer combat modes with up to eight players.

The game features a story reboot of the Front Mission series and deals with the rising tensions in the late 22nd century between global powers utilizing orbital elevators to expand their reach into space. The story begins as one state's elevator is attacked by parties unknown.

The game received mixed reviews, with critics finding the gameplay to be unpolished and the story to be generic.

== Gameplay ==
As a third-person shooter, the gameplay of Front Mission Evolved differs from the tactical role-playing game entries of the numbered Front Mission titles. Rather than being played out on a grid-based map and using a turn-based structure, battles takes place in real-time on full 3D maps akin to Front Mission: Online. The player (and many allies and adversaries) control mechs known as Wanderung Panzer ("walking tank"), abbreviated into wanzer. Evolved has two modes of play: an offline single player mode which features a story campaign, and an online multiplayer mode where players can play alone or in groups of up to eight players in a variety of game modes.

Game progression in the single player mode of Evolved works similarly to other Front Mission entries, and is done in a linear manner: watch cut-scene events, complete missions, set up wanzers during intermissions, and sortie for the next mission. Unlike other Front Mission titles, the player can redo missions at any given time using the Act Select feature. Players can earn Trophies or Achievements if they own the PlayStation 3 or Xbox 360 version of the game. In the multiplayer mode of Evolved, players can compete against each other in PvP matches through one of four game modes, or in PvE matches via a DLC game mode called "Last Stand".

Wanzer customization in the multiplayer mode of Evolved works similarly to Front Mission: Online in that the parts, auxiliary backpacks, and weapons the player can access is entirely dependent on their military ranking. Military rankings work in a progression-based fashion; players must complete mission assignments to earn experience and advance in rank. A player can also raise their rank by scoring kills against players on the opposing team.

Missions aside, Evolved boasts other new features as well as returning ones, particularly from Front Mission Series: Gun Hazard. The game introduces new auxiliary backpacks, Gunship Mode and a feature known as "EDGE". Hover backpacks allow wanzers to move around quickly or hover above the ground. Anti-missile backpacks increase enemy missile lock-on time, and release flares to throw off missile fire. Featured only in the single player campaign, Gunship Mode is a combat mode in which the player fights on a gunship; this mode plays out like a rail shooter. E.D.G.E. is a unique ability that slows down time and allows the player to better react against enemy attacks. This feature is only seen in the single player campaign. The lone returning feature in Evolved is Infantry Mode fromGun Hazard, which is only available in the single player campaign. In Infantry Mode, players can go into combat on foot, but will not be able to ride any vehicle.

== Plot ==
=== Setting ===
Front Mission Evolved is a story reboot of the Front Mission series, taking place after the storyline of the older titles. Therefore, new players to the series do not need to play the previous entries.

Set in 2171, the game takes place around the world and in outer space. During the 22nd century, the world's superpowers look towards space for expansion and began constructing large orbiting structures connected to the surface by orbital elevators. With an increasing number of surveillance satellites and space-based technologies being developed, a Cold War-style atmosphere sets in as the supranational unions used these technologies to watch over their adversaries on Earth. Tensions rise in 2171 when one of the elevators in the United States of the New Continent (USN) is attacked and destroyed by unknown assailants.

=== Story ===
The plot of Front Mission Evolved revolves around USN engineer Dylan Ramsey. As an engineer for the weapons developer Diable Avionics, Dylan begins testing of a prototype wanzer on Long Island, New York. In the midst of the wanzer test, unknown forces begin attacking New York City and its orbital elevator, Percival. Worried about his father's safety in the city, he sets off for New York City inside the prototype wanzer. As he travels through the city to reach the National Strategy Research Laboratory (NSRL), Ramsey assists USN forces battling the unknown assailants. After battling through numerous enemy wanzers, vehicles, and aircraft, Dylan makes it to the NSRL premises just as missiles are launched into the building. With his father seemingly dead, he engages the attacker, Marcus Seligman of the Apollo's Chariot. The fight is cut short when the orbital elevator begins crashing down on New York City. After Percival collapses, Dylan is recruited into the USN Army as it prepares for war against the Oceania Cooperative Union (OCU).

== Development ==
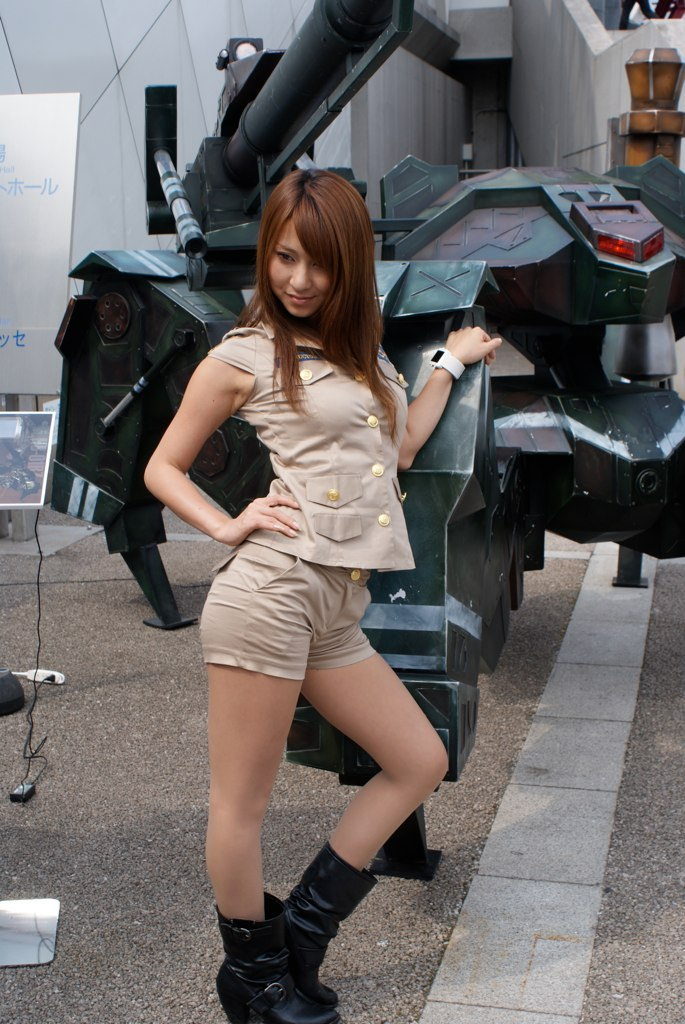
Promotion at the Tokyo Game Show 2009

The game was announced before E3 in May 2009, and demonstrated at E3 in Los Angeles in June 2010. At Comicon 2009, Square Enix showed off figurines based on the game. Players who pre-ordered the game received the Calm and Rexon wanzer mechs, which had been featured in previous Front Mission games.

=== Music ===
The games music was composed by Garry Schyman, the first non-Japanese composer for the series or any other major Square Enix series. He was brought onto the project by Double Helix Games, who developed the game for Square Enix. Garry Schyman describes the music as "orchestral and mostly tonal" with a heavy militaristic theme; almost all of the music is combat or action-themed. The music is more traditionally orchestral than previous Front Mission soundtracks, and was recorded with a live orchestra. As Square Enix intended the game and its music to be a departure from previous games in the series, Schyman purposely did not listen to any of the music from prior games.

The soundtrack was not released as a physical album, though it was announced be included in a box release of music from the entire series. A sampler album of music from missions 01 to 05 from the game's single player campaign was released by Square Enix on the iTunes and Mora music stores on September 30, 2010, under the title Front Mission Evolved Original Soundtrack / Mission 01 to 05. This digital album contains 14 tracks and has a length of 23:47. The final track is a bonus tune done by DJ Kaya, "Military Tune/α：Kalen".

== Reception ==
Reception

Aggregate score
Aggregator	Score
Metacritic	PC: 63/100; PS3: 58/100; X360: 58/100

Review scores
Publication	Score
Destructoid	5/10
Eurogamer	6/10
Game Informer	7.75/10
GameSpot	5.5/10
GamesRadar+	3.5/5
IGN	6.0/10
PC Gamer (US)	78/100
The Guardian	3/5
VideoGamer.com	6/10

Front Mission Evolved received mixed reviews from critics, and holds an aggregate score of 58 out of 100 on Metacritic.

Greg Miller of IGN scored the game 6.0/10, calling it "uninspired" and that it would only appeal to "hardcore mech-heads". He commented that the missions were mainly "frustrating filler", and while the customization of the wanzer was enjoyable, it was often negated by missions "shoehorning you into annoying loadouts". Calling its story "less than stellar", he stated that "it doesn't feel like a full fledged game".

Brett Todd of GameSpot scored the game 5.5/10, saying that despite the attempt to appeal to a new audience, it "won't win the franchise any new fans", due to its "predictable, abbreviated campaign". He described the story as "turgid", with the player's suspension of disbelief "derailed" by "cornball villains". While complementing the sound design as "thundering and atmospheric", he stated that the combat quickly becomes "mind-numbing" due to its repetitiveness. Noting that its boss battles can drag on to a half hour in length due to "absurdly overpowered" bosses and an overabundance of health pickups, he states that they are so slow that you "just want to give up on the whole thing".

The game's on-foot segments were also panned by critics, who compared them to a "sub-par third person shooter" due to their lack of a cover system.
