= Shinji Hashimoto =

Japanese game producer (born 1958)

- 橋本 真司
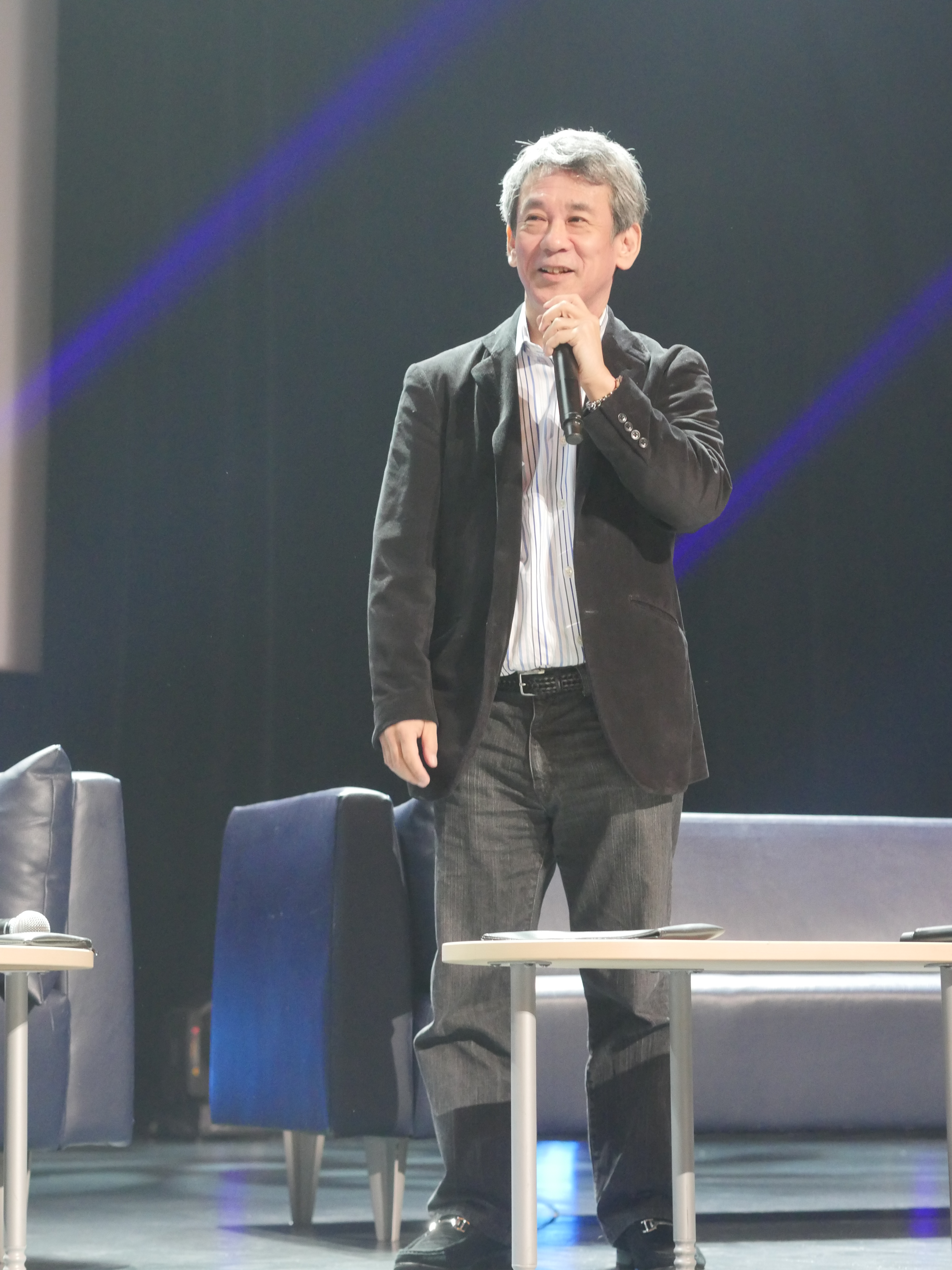
- Hashimoto in 2015
- Born: May 24, 1958 (age 68); Kitakyushu, Fukuoka, Japan
- Education: Komazawa University
- Occupation: Video game producer
- Years active: 1983–present
- Employers: Bandai (1983–1991); Cobra Team (1991–1994); Square (1995–2003); Square Enix (2003–2022) Sony Music Entertainment Japan (2022–present)
- Known for: Final Fantasy series; Kingdom Hearts series
- Title: Senior Advisor

Shinji Hashimoto (橋本 真司, Hashimoto Shinji; born May 24, 1958) is a Japanese former game producer at Square Enix and currently senior advisor at Sony Music Entertainment Japan and a board member at Forwardworks. He served as the Final Fantasy series brand manager for over a decade, was an executive officer at Square Enix board of directors and he was the Head of Square Enix's Business Division 3 for 6 years. He is also the co-creator of the Kingdom Hearts series. He served as corporate executive of the company's 1st Production Department during its entire existence.

In May 2021, Hashimoto announced he would be working in Square Enix Holdings as Corporate Advisor training future leaders of the company, after he stepped down from his position of executive director and Final Fantasy brand manager at Square Enix Co.

Hashimoto retired from his duties at Square Enix on May 31, 2022. On June 16, 2022, Hashimoto announced he would be a senior advisor at Sony Music Entertainment Japan, as well as board member for ForwardWorks.

== Biography ==
=== Early work ===
Hashimoto previously worked for the toy company Bandai. He joined Squaresoft (later known as Square Enix) in 1995, which is where he spent the rest of his career.

=== Final Fantasy ===
He was the promotions producer for Final Fantasy VII. When asked at E3 2008 about the possibility of a remake of Final Fantasy VII, he said that Square Enix is aware fans would like that, and that they are very busy making other titles first. As Final Fantasy X-2 and Kingdom Hearts were being completed, the learning experience the team had during the Compilation of Final Fantasy VII project spawned the Fabula Nova Crystallis series which was supposed to build on it.

=== Kingdom Hearts ===
When Square was sharing a building in Tokyo with the Disney corporation, Hashimoto found himself conversing in an elevator with a Disney executive, and there they conceived the crossover between Square Enix and Disney called Kingdom Hearts. Hashimoto has stated that the new features in Kingdom Hearts II were the result of the success of the first game and Disney's increased trust in Square Enix to pull off an excellent product.

=== Other games ===
While working on Front Mission Evolved, one of the challenges was balancing the speed of the real time battles the wanzers, or mechs, were having so that the game was realistic to the mechs size, but also still fast enough to be engaging.

=== Priorities ===
While discussing Final Fantasy XIII, Hashimoto mentioned that Square Enix has been attempting to make localization of their game releases close the release gap between Japan and the rest of the world.

== Works ==
=== Video games ===
Year	Title	Role
1986	Kidō Senshi Z-Gundam: Hot Scramble	Marketing
1989	Famicom Jump: Hero Retsuden	Producer
1991	Famicom Jump II: Saikyō no Shichinin	Producer
1993	Dragon Ball Z	Producer
1993	JoJo's Bizarre Adventure	Executive producer
1994	Dragon Ball Z 2: Super Battle	Producer
1995	Front Mission	Producer
1996	Front Mission: Gun Hazard	Executive producer
1996	Treasure Hunter G	Producer
1996	Tobal No. 1	Executive producer
1997	Final Fantasy VII	Publicity producer
1997	Tobal 2	Producer
1997	Front Mission 2	Executive producer
1997	Einhander	Executive producer
1997	Front Mission Alternative	Producer
1997	Chocobo's Mysterious Dungeon	Executive producer
1998	Soukaigi	Executive producer
1998	Ehrgeiz	Supervisor
1999	Final Fantasy VIII	Producer
1999	Chocobo Racing	Producer
1999	Cyber Org	Producer
2000	Driving Emotion Type-S	Producer
2000	Final Fantasy IX	Producer
2000	The Bouncer	Producer
2001	Wild Card	Producer
2002	Kingdom Hearts	Producer
2004	Kingdom Hearts: Chain of Memories	Producer
2005	Final Fantasy IV Advance	Executive producer
2005	Kingdom Hearts II	Producer
2006	Final Fantasy V Advance	Executive producer
2006	Final Fantasy VI Advance	Executive producer
2006	Final Fantasy Fables: Chocobo Tales	Executive producer
2007	Kingdom Hearts Re:Chain of Memories	Producer
2007	The World Ends with You	Producer
2007	Final Fantasy Fables: Chocobo's Dungeon	Executive producer
2008	Kingdom Hearts coded	Executive producer
2008	Dissidia Final Fantasy	Executive producer
2009	Kingdom Hearts 358/2 Days	Executive producer
2009	Final Fantasy XIII	Executive producer
2010	Kingdom Hearts Birth by Sleep	Executive producer
2010	Lufia: Curse of the Sinistrals	Executive producer
2010	Front Mission Evolved	Producer, original concept
2010	Kingdom Hearts Re:coded	Executive producer
2010	The 3rd Birthday	Executive producer
2011	Dissidia 012 Final Fantasy	Executive producer
2011	Imaginary Range	Producer
2011	Final Fantasy Type-0	Executive producer
2011	Final Fantasy XIII-2	Executive producer
2012	Theatrhythm Final Fantasy	Executive producer
2012	Kingdom Hearts 3D: Dream Drop Distance	Executive producer
2013	Final Fantasy All the Bravest	Executive producer
2013	Kingdom Hearts HD 1.5 Remix	Executive producer
2013	Lightning Returns: Final Fantasy XIII	Executive producer
2013	Final Fantasy X/X-2 HD Remaster	Executive producer
2014	Theatrhythm Final Fantasy: Curtain Call	Executive producer
2014	Kingdom Hearts HD 2.5 Remix	Executive producer
2014	Final Fantasy Explorers	Executive producer
2015	Kingdom Hearts Unchained χ	Executive producer
2016	World of Final Fantasy	Producer
2016	Final Fantasy XV	Producer
2017	Kingdom Hearts HD 2.8 Final Chapter Prologue	Executive producer
2018	Dissidia Final Fantasy NT	Executive producer
2019	Kingdom Hearts III	Executive producer
2019	Left Alive	Producer
2020	Final Fantasy VII Remake	Executive producer
2021	Neo: The World Ends with You	Executive producer
2025	Resident Evil: Survivor Unit	Executive producer

=== Films ===
Year	Title	Role
2005	Final Fantasy VII: Advent Children	Producer
2005	Last Order: Final Fantasy VII	Executive producer
2009	Final Fantasy VII: Advent Children Complete	Producer
2016	Kingsglaive: Final Fantasy XV	Producer
