= PlayOnline =

Online gaming service by Square Enix

- PlayOnline service logo
- Type: Subsidiary
- Industry: Internet services Computer software Digital distribution
- Founded: June 6, 2000; 26 years ago
- Headquarters: Japan
- Area served: Worldwide
- Owner: Square Enix Holdings
- Parent: Square Enix

PlayOnline is an online gaming service owned by Square Enix as the launcher application and Internet service for many of the online PC, PlayStation 2 and Xbox 360 games the company publishes. Launched on June 6, 2000, the service hosted games including Front Mission Online, Fantasy Earth: The Ring of Dominion, Tetra Master, and the Japanese releases of EverQuest II, Dirge of Cerberus: Final Fantasy VII and JongHoLo. As of 2026, however, the PC version of Final Fantasy XI is the only remaining game supported by the service.

PlayOnline was one of the first cross-platform gaming services, and hosted hundreds of thousands of players at its peak. It was shut down for twelve days during the 2011 earthquake in Japan. The platform was also subjected to denial of service attacks and players attempting to cheat were subsequently banned. Starting with Final Fantasy XIV, Square Enix began moving their online games off the service as membership declined. The termination date for Final Fantasy XI and PlayOnline on PlayStation 2 and Xbox 360 was March 2016, with only the PC version of Final Fantasy XI still supported.

== History ==
=== Launch ===
PlayOnline was originally conceived as an all-in-one solution to house multiple types of game content. At the "Square Millennium" event in Japan in January 2000, Square announced Final Fantasy IX, X and XI, with the last scheduled to release in the summer of 2001, and that they had been working on an online portal called PlayOnline with Japanese telecom company NTT Communications, which would feature online games, chat, email, online comics, Internet browsing, online shopping, sports, and instant messaging. The service was first announced as costing ¥500 for monthly membership, and a ¥1000 monthly user fee. Final Fantasy XI, then nicknamed Final Fantasy Online, was the first game to use the online service. The WonderSwan Color portable gaming system was also planned to be able to connect to PlayOnline through an adapter connected to one of the PlayStation 2's USB ports.

PlayOnline opened on June 6, 2000, to both Japanese and English speaking countries with news about upcoming software titles, interviews, and wallpapers. The site's merchandise included pieces from Parasite Eve, Vagrant Story, Chocobo Racing, Front Mission, Chrono Cross, and Final Fantasy.

To encourage early adoption prior to the release of Final Fantasy XI, Square partnered with BradyGames to publish a paperback strategy guide for Final Fantasy IX. The guide became notorious for barely containing any actual guidance. Instead, it asked players multiple times on each page to visit PlayOnline to obtain the solutions to puzzles, etc. Initial plans to utilize PlayOnline with Final Fantasy X were eventually scrapped.

=== Service ===
PlayOnline was seen as part of Sony's strategy to turn the PlayStation 2 into an Internet set-top box. Accordingly, Sony brought broadband equipment and a hard drive to the PlayStation 2. The quality of the browser was noted in its "clean" graphics, excellent page layouts, and "high quality sound". The browser was not a general purpose Internet tool, but only accessed Square content, such as news about Square products and a comic-strip walkthrough of Final Fantasy XI.

Porting Final Fantasy XI to the Xbox proved difficult due to compatibility issues greater than was hoped for between Xbox Live and PlayOnline, likely because the latter was designed first. After negotiation, Xbox 360 players were able to play the game through PlayOnline's servers exclusively, despite Microsoft's initial wish that Square Enix would use its own platform. Downloadable content was also not available on the platform since the game played through PlayOnline. It was hoped that content would eventually be offered through the Xbox Live Marketplace. Final Fantasy XII started out as a game designed for the PlayOnline game platform.

=== Security and outages ===
In February 2005, 800 players were banned from Final Fantasy XI and the card game Tetra Master for monopolizing areas where high level items and monsters would spawn, making it impossible for other players to become stronger.

On April 9, 2005, a distributed denial of service attack against PlayOnline's servers shut down Final Fantasy XI access for players in North America and Europe for three hours: the attack continued for over a week, leading Square Enix to involve law enforcement. At the time, Square Enix did not reveal if the Japanese server which hosted Front Mission Online, Fantasy Earth, and Japanese players of EverQuest II were affected.

A new security system for players by Square Enix began on April 6, 2009, involving a security token that players could purchase for $9.99 and including an in-game bonus called a "Mog Satchel".

After Japan's 2011 earthquake, Square Enix disabled servers to conserve energy due to the incapacitated state of the region's nuclear power plant. This led to a temporary halt of the Final Fantasy XIV, XI and PlayOnline games and services from March 13 to 25. During the power shortage, air conditioning and lighting was reduced, and the subscription fees for Final Fantasy XI were waived for the month of April.

=== Decline ===
In June 2009, Square Enix decided not to use PlayOnline for Final Fantasy XIV due to the marked decrease of content on the service. Instead, they migrated to a new service that still allowed cross-platform gameplay, including the use of a universal Square Enix ID that would allow players to play from wherever they left off. Two years later, Square Enix merged the account management portion of the PlayOnline service into Square Enix accounts from July and culminating on August 31. However, PlayOnline is still required in order to actually play Final Fantasy XI. Square Enix replicated the idea of the friends list from Final Fantasy XI in XIV. The termination date of service for Final Fantasy XI and PlayOnline for PlayStation 2 and Xbox 360 was March 2016.

== List of supported games ==
| Title | Platorms | Release Date | Shutdown Date | Notes |
|---|---|---|---|---|
| Final Fantasy XI | PlayStation 2 Microsoft Windows Xbox 360 | May 16, 2002 | March 31, 2016 (PlayStation 2, Xbox 360) | Windows servers are currently active. |
| Tetra Master | PlayStation 2 Microsoft Windows | May 16, 2002 | December 31, 2011 | Bundled with Final Fantasy XI and Front Mission: Online. |
| JongHoLo | PlayStation 2 | October 7, 2002 | December 31, 2011 | |
| Front Mission: Online | PlayStation 2 Microsoft Windows | May 12, 2005 | March 31, 2008 | |
| Dirge of Cerberus: Final Fantasy VII | PlayStation 2 | January 26, 2006 | September 29, 2006 | Original Japanese version only. |
| Fantasy Earth: The Ring of Dominion | Microsoft Windows | February 23, 2006 | October 30, 2006 | Operations moved to Gamepot and rebranded to "Fantasy Earth Zero". The game switched to a Free-to-play model. Operations were later transferred back to Square Enix as a non-PlayOnline title in September 2015 and continued until its shutdown in September 2022. |

=== Japanese servers only ===
| Title | Developer | Platorms | Shutdown Date | Notes |
|---|---|---|---|---|
| EverQuest II | Sony Online Entertainment | Microsoft Windows | June 30, 2006 | Japanese servers transferred to Sony Online Entertainment on July 1, 2006. |

== Reception ==
In December 2001, Square Enix projected it would have 250,000 users by the end of the year, and 400,000 by the end of 2002. The service charged $10 per person, and thus needed 200,000 participants to break even.

By January 2004, PlayOnline had over 500,000 registered users, and slightly under one million active players. By September, the service had 1.2 million characters, with most players having two to three characters. In May 2005, Front Mission Online became the second game to utilize the service, retailing at ¥7,140 with a monthly subscription price of ¥1,344. In June 2009, a San Francisco resident sued Square Enix for "deceptive advertising, unfair competition, and unjust enrichment" from Final Fantasy XI, and sought a $5 million settlement.

Composer Nobuo Uematsu said that Square's efforts to push forward with online gaming was important to the video game industry's development. The PlayOnline Viewer was criticized as being nothing more than a longer way to get to Final Fantasy XI's content. The game also had unmoderated chat rooms that ended up with explicit content. The interface was also described as "clunky" with "strange functional restrictions".
