= Head Buster =

1991 video game

- Cover art
- Developer(s): NCS Corporation; Winds Co.
- Publisher(s): Masaya
- Producer(s): Toshiro Tsuchida
- Programmer(s): Takahiro Matsuzawa
- Composer(s): Noriyuki Iwadare; Isao Mizoguchi; Hiroshi Fujioka
- Platform(s): Game Gear
- Release: JP: March 15, 1991
- Genre(s): Strategy involving breeding/constructing
- Mode(s): Single-player, multiplayer

Head Buster (ヘッドバスター; Headbuster) is a 1991 video game for the Game Gear handheld console. It involves robots fighting in combat sequences.

== Gameplay ==
If the opponent happens to be range of the player's weapon, he can prepare to destroy the enemy.

The object is to earn more gold by winning matches and spending that money on better weapons like rifles, missile launchers, and flamethrowers. Robots can be traded in for money (gold) if updating them is impossible. At the center of each starting point is a base (circle). Either the base must be destroyed or all the opponent's robots must be destroyed in order to clear the battlefield. There is a certain range to each weapon; opponents cannot be attacked if they are too close or too far away from the weapon's firing range.

There are ten different maps in the game. Each level has its own password. Players must deliver newspapers for a tiny stipend in order to resume competing after a loss.

== Development ==
The beta version of Head Buster had a different readout of the battle along with more complicated terrain types. Stairs, for example, would have been used to climb up steep mountains. They were removed during the late development stages. Players would have to develop their robots literally from the ground up in the unfinished version while robot models were already fully assembled in the finished version.
