= Left Alive =

2019 video game

- Developer: Ilinx
- Publisher: Square Enix
- Director: Toshifumi Nabeshima
- Producer: Shinji Hashimoto
- Artists: Yoji Shinkawa; Takayuki Yanase
- Composer: Hidenori Iwasaki
- Series: Front Mission
- Engine: Orochi 4
- Platforms: PlayStation 4; Windows
- Release: JP: February 28, 2019; WW: March 5, 2019
- Genres: Action-adventure, stealth
- Mode: Single-player

Left Alive (Note: Japanese: レフト・アライブ, Hepburn: Refuto araibu) is a 2019 action-adventure stealth game developed by Ilinx and published by Square Enix. It was released in February and March 2019 for the PlayStation 4 and Windows platforms. It was announced at a press conference by Sony Interactive Entertainment before the 2017 Tokyo Game Show. Set in the universe of the Front Mission series of video games, the story follows several individuals trying to survive amidst a surprise invasion of their country, while both helping civilians to safety and attempting to stop destruction and damage wrought by Wanzers, a form of combat mecha.

Originally conceived as a strategy game, it gained more action elements as development proceeded and ultimately became the first survival game in the Front Mission series. Developers conceived character ideas before the game's planning began, and many changes to their appearances and ages occurred as the story solidified. Left Alive received generally unfavorable reviews from critics. While many praised the graphics, story, and music, reviewers criticized the game's controls, artificial intelligence, game physics, and voice acting.

== Gameplay ==
Left Alive is a primarily stealth-based third-person shooter, with survival game elements as well. Players spend most of their time trying to evade enemies and create improvised weapons when stealth fails or is not an option. Activities include guiding survivors to safe houses, crafting weapons, and planning the takedown of wanzers. Players can search the bodies of other players who died in the same area. They also occasionally have the opportunity to take control of Wanzers and do significant damage to their enemies.

During interactions with civilians and other NPCs, there will be dialogue choices that the player can choose. Koshka, a Rutherian command and control AI, guides players and warns them when enemies come close. Weapon crafting includes creating improvised explosive devices, traps, and different kinds of explosives from scrounged materials. Players guide survivors to the safe houses by issuing commands on the map screen.

== Plot ==
The story takes place in the Front Mission series during a conflict between two Eastern European countries, Ruthenia and Garmoniya, formerly Ukraine. The game breaks the story into fourteen chapters and three characters individual stories. Players begin as Mikhail, a Ruthenian Wanzer pilot who must survive the loss of his Wanzer and fellow soldiers. The next character is Olga, a police captain and former soldier of the Garmoniyan Army before the city she lives in became part of Ruthenia. The last character is Leonid, a former Novo Slava rebel leader accused of murder. The plot begins with a surprise invasion by Garmoniya into the Ruthenian city of Novo Slava on the border between the two countries, the same city where Olga works. Koshka, the Ruthenia military's logistics and communications AI system, supports all three protagonists.

Leonid, in a conversation sequence at the start of his level talking to Koshka

After enemy forces kill Mikhail's unit, he meets Patrick Lemaire, an agent of the Unified Continental States (UCS), posing as a journalist. Mikhail then recruits him into investigating a conspiracy involving an advanced prototype Wanzer and a virus known as MODS, both of which were secretly being developed in Ruthenia by rogue officials. Patrick explains that the actual reason is because Garmoniya is secretly acting on behalf of the Republic of Zaftra and its secret ruling body Semargl to obtain the virus and the wanzer.

As the invasion begins, Olga encounters a young orphan named Julia, whom she pursues to save her from a human trafficking ring run by the Garmoniyan military. Olga discovers Julia is a survivor of a Semargl research project which infected victims with the MODS virus. Leonid is framed for the assassination of Novo Slava's liberator and national hero, Ruslan Izmailov, and forced to escape during the invasion. He learns that Ruslan is still alive and is a deep cover Semargl agent. Seeking revenge, Leonid pursues Ruslan and kills him. However, Olga later witnesses an inexplicably alive Ruslan appear and capture Julia on behalf of Semargl.

The three protagonists meet up and head downtown to reach a rescue helicopter sent by Patrick. Olga goes off to rescue Julia, while Mikhail hijacks an unattended Wanzer to create a distraction. On his way to the rescue helicopter, Leonid encounters Ruslan, now revealed to be a cyborg. After a final confrontation, Leonid destroys Ruslan, and the three protagonists are picked up by Patrick's rescue helicopter as an international peacekeeping force arrives to take control of Novo Slava.

If all thirty civilians and four major supporting characters the protagonists encounter through the game survive, a secret ending will play. It shows Ruslan revealing to Leonid during their final confrontation that Semargl possesses a computer system called M3, which can predict the future. M3 predicted that human overpopulation would lead to humanity's decline, leading Semargl to use the MODS virus as a means of population control. An after-credits scene shows Koshka uploading all data acquired from the invasion of Novo Slava to M3 before "proceeding with the next phase".

== Development ==
Left Alive was developed by Japanese developer Ilinx and produced by Square Enix. Toshifumi Nabeshima directed the title, previously having directed some of the games in the Armored Core franchise. Shinji Hashimoto, who helped produce entries in both Front Mission and Square Enix's Final Fantasy series, served as producer for Left Alive. Yoji Shinkawa, known for his work on the Metal Gear series, created the game's promotional art. In addition to overseeing the design of some of the models, Shinkawa did character designs of the three main protagonists and one of the Wanzer mecha models. He drew concept art of some of the other characters. Artist Takayuki Yanase, who worked on Xenoblade Chronicles X, also contributed to Wanzer designs. When development began, the development team initially conceived the title as a strategy game, but it became more of an action title under Toshifumi Nabeshima's influence. Nabeshima initially thought that the game would revolve around mech robots fighting each other due to the title's Front Mission roots. However, when he learned that players would control people and fight against wanzers, Front Mission's term for mechs, he considered giving them a guard suit or power suit. Later on in development, the game took a very different turn toward a survival mechanic.

For the game's artwork, Nabeshima had the design team make sure he remained faithful to the Front Mission aesthetic. He also created a character with the inspiration he found through the artwork of the original Front Mission artist Yoshitaka Amano, who is also one of his favorite artists. Artist Yoji Shinkawa drew the three main characters based on a simple profile and then began submitting rough sketches of Leonid's character for consideration since that was a character type he was very familiar with. He then designed the characters, continuously checking to see that he was maintaining a balance between them. He also did sketches for the game's other key characters and also designed one of the wanzers. The mechs did not have to look like traditional "Zenith-type" wanzers from Front Mission, just "powerful/formidable", so Shinkawa designed purely from his imagination. Shinkawa advised on the 3D graphics and how they looked in motion. Shinkawa notes that he adjusted designs with developer feedback for each character about three to four times. There was much discussion about the direction of Mikhail's character, with him first conceived as middle-aged but then young and handsome, necessitating a redesign. His personality began as conceited, like one who had an affluent childhood, but as his dialogue made him more "honest and earnest", his design changed again.

Before story development, Yoji Shinkawa already had some characters who existed in the Front Mission series in development. In developing the game, the team discussed prioritizing a sense of reality for the story. This decision led them to set the game in the present world, but all the countries names are changed. The designers also decided that a very realistic plot that would still feel like Front Mission would involve several characters dealing with "evil conspiracies" caused by nations plotting against each other. Composer Hidenori Iwasaki worked on the music, drawing from his experiences as the composer for some of the music in previous Front Mission games. Orchestrator Jordan Seigel and audio engineer Shinnosuke Miyazawa also helped record the soundtrack at Abbey Road Studios in London.

== Release ==
In September 2017 at the Tokyo Game Show, the game was announced with an intended release year of 2018. In September 2018, Square Enix communicated a Japanese release date of February 28, 2019. The following month, Square Enix stated that they would release the game outside of Japan on March 5, 2019. People who pre-ordered the game received five desktop wallpapers, a downloadable content pack, and a sample soundtrack. A special edition called the "Mech Edition" was also released that included everything in the pre-ordered version, along with an action figure of a Wanzer designed by Yanase and an official artbook. As part of promotions, Square Enix collaborated with Japanese rock band Man with a Mission to release a song called "Left Alive" on the Japanese release date of February 28.

On the day the game was released worldwide, Square Enix launched a free downloadable content pack for Left Alive. This "World of Tanks Collaboration" pack contained only in-game advertising for World of Tanks.

== Reception ==
Reception

Aggregate score
Aggregator	Score
Metacritic	PC: 40/100; PS4: 37/100

Review scores
Publication	Score
Destructoid	2/10
Famitsu	31/40
GameRevolution	2/5
GameSpot	3/10
IGN	3.8/10

Left Alive received "generally unfavorable" reviews, according to review aggregator Metacritic. In Japan, approximately 17,622 physical units for PlayStation 4 were sold during its launch week, becoming the number five selling game of any format.

DM Schmeyer of IGN called the game a "failure on every level", with poor controls and game balances issues cited along with technical glitches. Jason Faulkner of Game Revolution praised the setting and plot but noted a wildly changing enemy intelligence that would either never miss or ignore the player completely. James Swinbanks of GameSpot praised the opening and some of the character dialogue but explained that the lack of story set up initially leads to significant plot revelations having no emotional impact. Dan Roemer of Destructoid praised the game's soundtrack and art direction but highlighted the low-resolution graphical textures that gave the game a "drab" look. He also noted "laughable" enemy physics, where killed enemies' bodies would jump in the air whenever they died, and described the voice acting as "varied", ranging from decent to sounding like the actors "gave up" after one take.

As an example of the game's poor physics, enemies exhibit a kind of jumping behavior as they are shot.

Heather Alexandra of Kotaku loved the idea of urban warfare, including searching for improvised weapons to take on war mechs, and said the game "drips with style and mood", but felt the game's "stiff" and "sluggish" controls made it impossibly hard to play.
