= Front Mission =

Video game series

- Series logo
- Genres: Tactical role-playing game, Third-person shooter, Side-scrolling shooter, Real-time strategy, Massively multiplayer online game
- Developers: G-Craft, Square, Square Enix, Omiya Soft, Winds, h.a.n.d., Double Helix Games, Ilinx, Forever Entertainment, Storm Trident
- Publishers: Square, Square Enix, Forever Entertainment
- Creator: Toshiro Tsuchida
- Platforms: Super Famicom, PlayStation, WonderSwan Color, PlayStation 2, PC, Nintendo DS, PlayStation 3, Xbox 360, PlayStation 4, Nintendo Switch, PlayStation 5, Windows, Xbox One, Xbox Series X/S
- First release: Front Mission; February 24, 1995
- Latest release: Front Mission 3: Remake; June 26, 2025

Front Mission (フロントミッション, Furonto Misshon) is a collection of video games and related media produced by Square, now Square Enix. The series was created by Toshiro Tsuchida and developed by G-Craft, a studio that was later absorbed by Square and existed within Square Enix as Product Development Division-6. Since the release of the original Front Mission in 1995, the series has gone on to encompass several media, including film, manga, novels, radio dramas, mobile phone applications, and toys. While the series is primarily rooted in the turn-based tactical role-playing genre, it has also ventured into other genres such as side-scrolling shooter, real-time strategy (RTS), massive multiplayer online (MMO), and third-person shooter through its spin-offs. The Front Mission video games achieved moderate success, selling over 3 million units worldwide up until January 2006.

The main selling point of Front Mission is its storytelling approach. Taking place during the 21st and 22nd centuries, the series revolves around military conflicts and political tension between powerful supranational unions and their member states. Although the Front Mission video games use self-contained, standalone stories, these tie into a greater overarching storyline that encompasses the entire series. In combination with the stories from its other media, the series possesses a level of storytelling depth and continuity comparable to a serial drama. Another major draw of Front Mission is its use of giant mecha called "wanzers" (from the fictional German word Wanderpanzer, or walking tanks) in battle.

== Development ==
Development of the first Front Mission started with discussions between software developers Square and G-Craft. Square had never had another developer make a game for them and planning proceeded slowly, but an agreement between the two was finished in the Fall of 1993. Game producer and writer Toshiro Tsuchida presented a proposal for a game called “100 Mission” to Square through his own development company, Solid, on G-Crafts behalf. When Square producer Shinji Hashimoto first saw the first version of the game proposal, he thought it was “too radical” and usually such proposals would not be approved. Square was not enthusiastic, repeatedly telling Tsuchida “no robots”, and being told by Square that game development couldn't just be driven by a creators passion anymore. Tsuchida also had difficulty explaining how much of a role robots would have in the proposed game, and so he obtained some development hardware to create a prototype of the title. Square was the only publisher at the time willing to consider Tsuchidas’ proposal. They finally agreed to make the game because they thought working in a new genre would be stimulating and it was a title they probably could not do themselves as to that point Square had mostly made fantasy games.

There are two types of Front Mission installments: the numbered entries and the non-numbered entries. The numbered Front Mission titles are all structured as tactical role-playing games. All other Front Mission titles that do not have a number assigned to it are genre spin-offs. Each of the five spin-off entries are classified under different genres. Front Mission: Gun Hazard is a side-scrolling shooter video game. Front Mission Alternative is a real-time strategy video game. Front Mission: Online is a massively multiplayer online third-person shooter video game. Front Mission Evolved is a third-person shooter video game with rail shooter segments. In an RPGamer interview with Front Mission developer Koichi Sakamoto in 2007, he suggested that the development team is interested in combining real-time and turn-based aspects for future installments.

== Games ==
Release timeline
1995	Front Mission
1996	Front Mission: Gun Hazard
1997	Front Mission 2
1997	Front Mission Alternative
1998
1999	Front Mission 3
2000–2002
2003	Front Mission 1st
2003	Front Mission History
2003	Front Mission 4
2004
2005	Front Mission 2089
2005	Front Mission: Online
2005	Front Mission 5: Scars of the War
2006	Front Mission 2089-II
2007
2008	Front Mission 2089: Border of Madness
2009
2010	Front Mission Evolved
2011–2018
2019	Left Alive
2020–2021
2022	Front Mission 1st: Remake
2023	Front Mission 2: Remake
2024
2025	Front Mission 3: Remake

Since 1995, the Front Mission series has released 15 video games, seven of which are main (numbered) entries and the other five are spin-off entries. Additionally, the series has spawned a number of video game ports, remakes, and compilations over its 15-year history. On July 12, 2002, a direct port of Front Mission was released for the Bandai WonderSwan Color. A year later, the video game entry received a Sony PlayStation remake under the title Front Mission 1st on October 23, 2003. Shortly after its release, a compilation titled Front Mission History was released in Japan on December 11, 2003. The compilation contained the Front Mission 1st remake, a modified Front Mission 2, and Front Mission 3. Front Mission 1st also spawned an enhanced port of the game on March 22, 2007 for the Nintendo DS. A second remake for Front Mission 2089 was developed and titled as Front Mission 2089: Border of Madness. This remake was released for the Nintendo DS in Japan on May 29, 2008. A third remake for Front Mission (called Front Mission 1st: Remake) was released on November 30, 2022 for the Nintendo Switch.

While all Front Mission video games have seen releases in Japan, only a few been localized overseas. Front Mission 3 was the first entry to receive both a North American and European localization on March 22, 2000 and August 11, 2000 respectively. Front Mission 4 became the second entry to undergo an English localization and was released in North America on June 15, 2004. A three-year gap followed before the localization of the Nintendo DS port of Front Mission 1st, which saw a release in North America on October 23, 2007. This marked the third time that a Front Mission title was localized for the North American region. Front Mission Evolved became the first spin-off entry to be localized in North America and Europe, making it the fourth and second titles respectively to reach those regions. It was released in Japan on September 16, 2010, in North America on September 28, 2010, and in Europe on October 8, 2010.

To date, only seven Front Mission entries (six games and a manga) have ever been officially localized and released outside Japan.

== Common elements ==
=== Gameplay ===
Although Front Mission video games venture into multiple genres, each of them contain core elements that are universal to the entire series. In the Front Mission series, players use playable units called wanzers, a term for mecha derived from the German word "Wanderpanzer", or "walking tank". Wanzers differ from the typical combat unit in that it has four modular parts: body, left arm, right arm, and legs. Each part has a specific function and its own health bar. The legs parts enable movement and evasion, the arm parts are necessary to use hand and shoulder weapons, and the body part maintains the wanzer's operability. In the event the body is destroyed, the wanzer is removed from play completely. Destruction of arm and leg parts does not remove the wanzer from play, but it severely cripples its performance. While the player fights mostly wanzers, vehicles, aircraft, and mobile weapons platforms are also featured. These enemy units generally have only one part, the body, and are much stronger than wanzers themselves.

Wanzers can be customized with a variety of parts, computers, auxiliary backpacks, and weapons. The player has full control over customizing their wanzers and can do so as long as its total weight value does not exceed its given power output. To field a wanzer in battle, it must have a complete frame of parts: body, left arm, right arm, and legs. Parts with built-in weapons in the body or arm sections can also be equipped on a wanzer. In most Front Mission titles, computers must also be installed; these improve the accuracy of the weapons equipped on the wanzer and allow for specialized attacks. Auxiliary backpacks and weapons are not mandatory equipment to use wanzers, but are crucial in order to progress through the games. Auxiliary backpacks serve to give a wanzer special features during combat. For example, storage backpacks allow the player to carry extra ammunition or armor repair items.

In terms of weapons, there are four classes of weapons: melee weapons, short-range weapons, long-range weapons, and support fire weapons. Melee weapons are hand-to-hand weapons with a tendency to strike the body part of its target. Knuckles, pile bunkers (a fist weapon consisting of a hydraulic spike), and rods are examples of melee weapons. Short-range weapons, such as machine guns, shotguns, and flamethrowers are used at close range and deal damage to all parts of a target. Long-range weapons have a long reach and are ideal for avoiding counterattacks. Sniper rifles, bazookas, and Gatling guns are examples of long-range weapons. Support-fire weapons, such as missiles, grenades, and rockets are indirect fire weapons; they can never be counterattacked and almost always hit their target, but have limited ammunition supply. Lastly, shields can be equipped on wanzers to absorb some of the damage taken from incoming attacks.

These are other gameplay features that are commonly seen in multiple Front Mission titles.

- Arena, introduced in Front Mission, allows the player to participate in special fights to earn monetary rewards or new parts. These fights take place in either individual matches, or team battles. This feature is also present in Front Mission 2, Front Mission 5: Scars of the War, Front Mission 2089: Border of Madness, and Front Mission: Online.
- Action Points (AP), introduced in Front Mission 2, determines the number of actions that can be taken during a Player and Enemy Phase. Every action, such as movement or counterattacks, has a certain AP cost. After one full turn (which is made up of one Player Phase and Enemy Phase) has passed, a set amount of AP is recharged. This feature is also present in Front Mission 3, Front Mission 4, and Front Mission 5: Scars of the War.
- Links, introduced in Front Mission 2, allows multiple units to assist each other in battles. A linked unit can provide support to other units offensively and defensively. This feature is also present in Front Mission 4, Front Mission 5: Scars of the War, and Front Mission 2089: Border of Madness.
- Network, introduced in Front Mission 2, is a pseudo-Internet that allows players to gain a better understanding of the Front Mission world, its characters, and the storyline through a series of websites. The player can also access online shopping (to purchase new equipment), battle simulations, and check e-mail messages through the Network. This feature is also present in Front Mission 3.
- Battle Simulator, introduced in Front Mission 3, allows the player to participate in VR training exercises. These training exercises can be used to increase the fighting proficiencies of the player's pilots and can be taken as many times as needed. This feature is also present in Front Mission 4, and Front Mission 5: Scars of the War.
- Survival Simulator, introduced in Front Mission 5: Scars of the War, is a survival simulation in which the player goes through a set number of floors with one pilot. Along the way, parts and weapons can be collected and brought back for usage in the main game upon the completion of a simulation. This feature is also present in Front Mission 2089-II.

=== Setting ===
These are the fictional nations that play a major role in the Front Mission series.

Oceania Cooperative Union

The Oceania Cooperative Union (OCU) is a supranational union of countries in Southeast Asia, Oceania, and Australia. The OCU capital, where the OCU Central Parliament located, is Canberra, Australia. The union's roots date back to 2006, when the Association of Southeast Asian Nations reorganized itself into the Bangkok Economic Alliance. The alliance is later renamed into the Oceania Cooperative Union in 2019 after Australia and Oceania decided to join the bloc. It is finally consolidated as a political union in 2026.

In the localized version of Front Mission 3, the OCU's full name is presented as "Oceana Community Union". The localized versions of subsequent games use the current naming convention instead.

United States of the New Continent

The United States of the New Continent (USN) is a supranational union of the North and South American countries. The USN capital, where the USN Central Government operates, is Washington DC. The union's roots date back to 2011, when its relations with Australia began to sour following a diplomatic incident over the detention of an Australian ship named The Trinidad. The United States and Canada begin negotiations on merging with South American countries after the Republic of Zaftra is formed in 2015. These talks culminate in the creation of the USN five years later.

In the localized versions of Front Mission First, Front Mission 4, and Front Mission Evolved, the USN is presented as the Unified Continental States (UCS). The localized version of Front Mission 3 retains the original naming convention.

European Community

The European Community (EC) is a supranational union of the nations in Europe. The capital, where the EC Central Assembly operates, is Paris, France. The union's roots date back to the European Union's (EU) genesis in 1993. In the late 1990s, the EU's founding member-states began to convince other European countries to join their banner. The EU is renamed as the European Community in 2005 as the last of the non-EU countries agree to join the bloc.

Organization of African Consolidation

The Organization of African Consolidation (OAC) is an alliance of African countries. The union's roots date back to 2026, when the EC and the OCU assisted the African nations to merge as a super-state. Unlike the other unions, the OAC is divided into five semi-autonomous regional blocs: the South African United States (SAUS), Union of North African States (UNAS), West African States Community Union (WA), the Community of Central African States (CA), and the East African Community (EA).

Republic of Zaftra

The Republic of Zaftra is a supranational union consisting of Russia and the Commonwealth of Independent States. The Zaftran capital, where the Zaftra Central Administration operates, is Moscow, Russia. The union's roots date back to the dissolution of the Soviet Union in 1991. The former Soviet republics struggled to survive on their own after it collapsed, facing economic hardships and civil conflicts. In an attempt to remedy their issues and make capitalism work, the post-Soviet nations reformed as the Republic of Zaftra in 2015.

Republic of Ravnui

The Republic of Ravnui is Belarus renamed after it seceded from the Commonwealth of Independent States rather than join the Republic of Zaftra in 2015. The nation's capital is Minsk.

People's Republic of Da Han Zhong

The People's Republic of Da Han Zhong (DHZ) is formed from the presumably peaceful reunification of China and Taiwan. The nation's capital is Beijing.

== Music ==
The music of the series includes the soundtracks to the main series, composed of Front Mission through Front Mission 5: Scars of the War, as well as the spin-off games, which include Front Mission: Gun Hazard, Front Mission Alternative, Front Mission: Online, Front Mission 2089 and its remake Front Mission 2089: Border of Madness, Front Mission 2089-II, and Front Mission Evolved. The soundtracks of the series' installments have been released in album form in Japan, with the exceptions of 2089, 2089-II, Border of Madness (which reuse music from the other installments) and Evolved, which was published in 2010. The soundtrack to Front Mission was released in 1995 by NTT Publishing, which also published the soundtrack to Front Mission: Gun Hazard in 1996. DigiCube published soundtrack albums for Front Mission 2 and Alternative in 1997 and 3 in 1999. Square Enix published the albums for Front Mission 4 in 2004, and 5 and Online in 2006.

The soundtracks of the series have been warmly reviewed by critics, especially those of the main series and Gun Hazard. The music of Alternative and Online was less well-received. The music of the series typically includes a fusion of electronic and orchestral music, though each game and composer in the series has taken the music in different directions. The composers for the series have included Yoko Shimomura, Noriko Matsueda, Koji Hayama, Hayato Matsuo, Hidenori Iwasaki, and Garry Schyman. A box set of music from across the series is currently planned, but has not yet been formally announced or given a release date.

== Reception ==
Aggregate review scores
Game	Metacritic
Front Mission (video game)	DS: 72/100
Front Mission Series: Gun Hazard	N/A
Front Mission 2	N/A
Front Mission Alternative	N/A
Front Mission 3	N/A
Front Mission 4	75/100
Front Mission 2089	N/A
Front Mission: Online	N/A
Front Mission 5: Scars of the War	N/A
Front Mission 2089-II	N/A
Front Mission Evolved	PC: 63/100; PS3: 58/100; X360: 58/100
Left Alive	PC: 40/100; PS4: 37/100

In April 1995, Front Mission's original release on the Super Famicom was well received. Famitsu magazine gave the Super Famicom version of the game first a 9 out of 10 and later an 8 out of 10 in their Reader Cross Review. Mega Fun gave the game a Gold for an import game. Front Mission: Gun Hazard was rated by Fun Generation a 7 out of 10, while Super GamePower gave it a 4.2 out of 5. Famitsu magazine awarded Front Mission 2 the game 32 out of 40 upon its release. The magazine chose the game as the number 63rd best game on the original PlayStation. Greg Kasavin of GameSpot praised the graphics of Front Mission Alternative and audio experience, but criticized the game for being too short and rewarding players with more elaborate story sections if they failed to achieve game missions, indirectly rewarding failure. He also called the soundtrack "a bunch of dizzying techno that doesn't suit the onscreen grandeur". Hardcore Gaming 101 noted it was not a very deep real time strategy game, but praised its branching stories and variety of endings. GameSpot noted that Front Mission 3 may be a title worth introducing the franchise to American audiences, but criticized its graphics for being a notch lower than Front Mission 2. IGN lauded the game's battle mechanics as rare in other Square installments since Final Fantasy Tactics, but cited the graphics transitions between overhead play and individual battles as spotty.

Front Mission 4 holds a 75% on both GameRankings and Metacritic. North American reaction to the game was consistent across the board, receiving mixed to generally good reviews. It was praised for its deep gameplay, customizable wanzers, and high production values. On the disapproving side many felt the plot advanced at a sluggish pace, the AI was subpar, and the menu system was cumbersome at times. GameSpot gave generally positive feedback for Front Mission Online, describing how the game was successfully transforming the strategy game series into an action and combat based experience. In RPG Fan's Games of 2006 feature, they enumerated the reasons that Front Mission 5: Scars of the War was the Import RPG of the Year make note of the game's improvements and excellent execution in design and functionality. The game was also voted the runner-up Strategy RPG of the Year by RPG Fan in their "Games of 2006" awards. While the developers acknowledge the good reception of the cinematic focus of the game, they noted that later entries in the series would not necessarily follow the same direction.

Greg Miller of IGN scored Front Mission Evolved a 6.0/10, calling it "uninspired" and that it would only appeal to "hardcore mech-heads". He commented that the missions were mainly "frustrating filler", and while the customization of the wanzer was enjoyable, it was often negated by missions "shoehorning you into annoying loadouts". Calling its story "less than stellar", he stated that "it doesn't feel like a full fledged game". IGN called Left Alive a “failure on every level”, with poor controls and game balances issues cited along with technical glitches. Destructoid praises the game's soundtrack and art direction, but highlighted the low resolution graphical textures that gave the game a “drab” look. They also noted “laughable” enemy physics, where killed enemies bodies would jump in the air however they died. They further describes voice acting as “varied”, from decent, to sounding like the actors “gave up” after one take. Kotaku loved the idea of urban warfare, including searching for improvised weapons to take on war mechs, but the game's “stiff” and “sluggish” controls made the game impossibly hard to play.

=== Legacy ===
Since 1994, the Front Mission series has spawned numerous products in various media outside of video games. The series has a long-running line of manga and novels that are expanded universe supplements to the stories of the Front Mission video games. Likewise, the series has produced two live-action films directed by Yoshihiko Dai and a ten-episode radio drama directed by Hiroshi Yamaguchi, both of which further expand the Front Mission universe. Some of the actors and actresses that have been involved in these productions include Banjō Ginga, Hiromi Tsuru, Dax Griffin, Danielle Keaton, and Tina Coté. Apart from these media, there have been numerous books, toys, and soundtracks that have been published under the Front Mission brand name.

== See also ==
- List of Square Enix video game franchises
