= Cyber Org =

1999 action video game

- Developer: FuzzBox
- Publisher: Square
- Director: Hyoji Shinohara
- Producer: Shinji Hashimoto
- Writer: Michie Narita
- Composer: Yoshihiro Sato
- Platform: PlayStation
- Release: JP: April 22, 1999
- Genre: Action
- Mode: Single-player

Cyber Org (サイバーオーグ SAIBAOGU) is an action video game developed by FuzzBox, published by Square and released in 1999 for the PlayStation.

== Gameplay ==
Classified as a Space Opera, a new type of action game, Cyber Org is set in a futuristic world, with three different playable characters and multiple areas to explore. Each area has puzzles and fight sequences rendered in polygonal 3D. The gameplay is easy to understand even for beginners, utilizing a single button combined with a secondary button for combo attacks.

== Audio ==
Cyber Org Original Soundtrack

Soundtrack album by Yoshihiro Sato
- Released: April 21, 1999
- Genre: Video game music
- Label: DigiCube

Professional ratings
Review scores
Source	Rating
Chudah's Corner	(A)
Square Enix Music Online	(9/10)

The music of Cyber Org was composed by Yoshihiro Sato.

Disc 1
No.	Title	Length
1.	"Bon Sorte 11"	2:09
2.	"High-Powered Drivin'"	4:27
3.	"Fire Walk with Me"	3:02
4.	"Indian Dawn"	2:44
5.	"Winds of July"	5:39
6.	"Transilvania"	4:03
7.	"Paradox"	3:49
8.	"Blood Street"	3:12
9.	"Power Station"	2:55
10.	"Black Vice"	3:07
11.	"Horizon"	3:58
12.	"Running High"	4:14
13.	"Twilight Syndrome"	4:24
14.	"Daydreamer"	3:48
15.	"Frenzy"	4:25
16.	"Survive or Die"	2:48
17.	"Thunder Storm"	3:16
18.	"Illusion"	3:15
19.	"Rose of Versailles"	3:15

Disc 2
No.	Title	Length
1.	"Time Trip So Far Away"	5:05
2.	"Darkness"	3:52
3.	"Star Child"	2:54
4.	"The Bargon Empire"	3:19
5.	"Requiem"	4:03
6.	"Standing on the Brave Hill with Soul"	3:31
7.	"T.J."	0:22
8.	"Gigante"	0:18
9.	"Fosis"	0:28
10.	"Forever & Ever"	3:00
11.	"Relay Point"	1:06
12.	"Area 1/Space Sargasso"	1:45
13.	"Area 2/Power Station"	2:21
14.	"Area 3/24th Dimension"	2:11
15.	"Area 4/Beam Cannon"	1:47
16.	"Area 5/Master Brain"	1:50
17.	"Area 6/Huge Battle Ship"	2:07
18.	"Event 1"	1:41
19.	"Event 2"	1:31
20.	"Event 3"	1:30
21.	"Event 4"	1:29
22.	"Event 5"	2:15
23.	"Event 6"	2:10
24.	"Ending Theme"	1:35
25.	"Symphony No. 1 [I. The Early Spring, II. Mother Earth, III. The Mystic Forest, IV. Birdcall] (Bonus Track)"	9:41

== Development ==
The game was announced in December 1998.
