= Front Mission 3 =

1999 tactical role-playing game

- Developer: Square
- Publisher: Square: NA: Square Electronic Arts
- Director: Toshiro Tsuchida
- Producer: Koji Yamashita
- Artists: Akihiro Yamada; Atsushi Domoto
- Writers: Norihiko Yonesaka; Kazuhiro Matsuda
- Composers: Koji Hayama; Hayato Matsuo; SHIGEKI
- Series: Front Mission
- Platform: PlayStation
- Release: JP: September 2, 1999; NA: March 21, 2000; EU: August 11, 2000
- Genre: Tactical role-playing game
- Mode: Single-player

Front Mission 3, also known in Japan as Front Mission Third, (Note: Japanese: フロントミッション サード, Hepburn: Furonto Misshon Sādo) is a tactical role-playing game developed and published by Square for the PlayStation. It was released in Japan in 1999, and North America by Square Electronic Arts and Europe in 2000. Front Mission 3 is the third main entry and the fifth entry overall in the Front Mission series. Like other Front Mission titles, Front Mission 3 is part of a serialized storyline that follows the stories of various characters and their struggles involving mecha known as wanzers.

Front Mission 3 was the first title in the Front Mission series to be released in North America, Europe and Australia.

A remake for the Nintendo Switch, titled Front Mission 3: Remake (Japanese: フロントミッション サード: リメイク), was announced in September 2022 and released on June 26, 2025. Ports to Microsoft Windows, PlayStation 4, PlayStation 5, Xbox One and Xbox Series X/S were released on January 30, 2026.

== Gameplay ==
The player chooses an action for one of their wanzers during battle gameplay.

The mechanics of Front Mission 3 are a radical departure from Front Mission and Front Mission 2. While it is a tactical role-playing game, there is a stronger emphasis on role-playing elements as opposed to strategic elements in Front Mission 3. The game progresses in a linear manner: watch cut-scene events, complete missions, set up wanzers during intermissions, and sortie for the next mission. The player travels to locations on a world map. As the player progresses through the plot, new locations are revealed on the world map. Towns and cities act as intermission points where the player can organize and set up their units for the upcoming mission. New to Front Mission 3 is the Double Feature Scenario – this allows the player to experience two different scenarios that exist independently of one another within the game's storyline. In other words, the player can play through two stories; while they may share common events and environments, the stories are largely unique and in essence are fully-fledged games.

Front Mission 3 missions are traditional tactical RPG fare, ranging from destroying all enemy targets to protecting a certain allied target. Where the game differs significantly from its predecessors lies mainly through a new combat feature – the ability to attack the pilots themselves. During any attack, the pilot can be damaged or forcefully ejected from their machines. The player can also have a pilot eject from their unit to fight on foot, or hijack another machine on the battlefield. The game also changes how skills are learned; instead of gaining experience to improve a pilot's proficiencies, they are now learned by equipping wanzer parts and using them in battle. When certain conditions are met, there is a random chance that a pilot may learn a new skill from one of their wanzer parts, which can be programmed into the wanzer's battle computer. Many gameplay features from Front Mission 2 have also been removed, greatly simplifying the overall structure of mission play. Missions are now much smaller in scale, limiting the amount of strategic options the player can use.

There are some returning features from Front Mission 2 that are used for mission play though, namely Action Points (AP) and Links. Action Points (AP) is a feature that dictates how much can be done with each unit. Actions such as moving and attacking require a certain amount of AP to use. At the end of a full turn, which is one Player Phase and Enemy Phase, a set amount of AP is replenished. A unit's AP amount value depends on how many combat ranks its pilot has earned; these are earned by destroying enemy units. Links is a unique ability that allows multiple units to provide offensive support to each other during Player Phase battles. Links operates differently in Front Mission 3; a unit's pilot must have a Link-class skill and the appropriate weapons (which also acts as their linked actions) equipped. Once this condition is met, a linked battle will commence if the skill activates. Up to three units can be linked together to form one "link".

Other returning features that appear in mission play include mission rankings and mission branching. As in Front Mission Alternative, players are graded on how well or poorly they clear missions. While there are incentives to perform well, the game does not reward the player with new parts or weapons as it did in Alternative. Mission branching returns and now allow players to choose what type of mission to play next. Aside from these, the Network feature from Front Mission 2 returns and is greatly expanded upon. Players can now browse through the pseudo-Internet, send and receive e-mail messages, tinker with online files and wallpapers, or use the new Battle Simulator feature. The Battle Simulator is a game mode where the player can participate in VR training exercises. These drills can be used to increase the fighting proficiencies of the player's pilots and can be taken as many times as needed. Lastly, players can strengthen their parts with the return of the remodeling feature. Through this, the player can augment a wanzer's armor coating (known as "Def-C"), the accuracy of its weapons, increase its jumping power to scale buildings, or equip it with rollers to dash on flat surfaces quickly.

== Story ==
Set in October 2112, the story of Front Mission 3 takes place in Southeast Asia, revolving around the cold war between the Oceania Cooperative Union (OCU) and the People's Republic of Da Han Zhong (DHZ). Since the People's Republic of Alordesh won their independence from the O.C.U. in 2102, member-states within the union also formed their own separatist movements. Countries such as Indonesia and Singapore began voicing their anti-OCU sentiments, both through peaceful and non-peaceful means. In 2106, pro-nationalist forces in the Philippines wage war on the government and their OCU handlers. Desperate to maintain stability in the region, the O.C.U. Central Parliament allows the United States of the New Continent (USN) to send in peacekeeping forces to resolve these conflicts. Eventually, the supranational union is pushed to the breaking point in 2112 when a mysterious explosion occurs at a Japanese Defense Force (JDF) base in Japan.

=== Plot ===
There are two plots of Front Mission 3, and both revolve around Japanese wanzer test pilots Kazuki Takemura and Ryogo Kusama. Through a decision made early in the game, the player can play either the DHZ scenario or the USN scenario. The DHZ scenario stars Japanese scientist Aliciana "Alisa" Takemura, while the USN scenario revolves around scientist Emir "Emma" Klamsky.

Although both scenarios have different characters and story scenarios, they both share a number of events and locations in the game. Due to its storytelling approach, it is not known which of the two scenarios is canonically related to Front Mission 5: Scars of the War. On October 31, Kazuki begins testing a new prototype wanzer at a Kirishima Heavy Industries test site near Okinawa. Upon completing the test, he is informed that some construction wanzers need to be taken to the JDF base in Yokosuka. Ryogo asks Kazuki if he can join him in delivering the wanzers. If the player chooses to go with him, they will play the USN scenario. If the player does not go with him, they will play the DHZ scenario.

In either case, Kazuki and Ryogo are eventually tasked to deliver the Kirishima prototypes to the Yokosuka base. As they ready the wanzers for delivery, an explosion leads Kazuki to attempt going inside the base itself. The two test pilots are eventually forced to leave the base. Realizing that his sister Alisa was recently transferred to the base, Kazuki and Ryogo eventually find themselves back inside the complex.

The two are then forced to escape the base and their JDF pursuers under different circumstances. On the USN scenario, Kazuki and Ryogo are aided by Emir with help from her USN allies. On the DHZ scenario, DHZ agent Liu Hei Fong saves the two and Alisa from being captured. In either case, Takemura and Kusama are blamed as terrorists behind the Yokosuka base attack. Wondering why they are being chased, Emma or Liu tells the two that the JDF stole a top-secret USN weapon called MIDAS from a base in Alaska, and that the explosion came from a failed attempt to reproduce it. The raid itself, which is in the game's opening cutscene, is viewed in Scars of the War as security camera footage.

The group pursues MIDAS to an OCU base hidden inside Taal Volcano in the Philippines, but the OCU uses it against a DHZ-aided rebel force conducting an amphibious landing in Batangas City. With MIDAS apparently gone for good, the group moves to the DHZ where they become involved in the government's battle against the USN-aided Hua Lian Rebels.

As the battle escalates, the group encounters the "Imaginary Numbers" and "Real Numbers," the results of a genetic engineering program intended to create the perfect human. Developed in Ravnui (formerly Belarus), Bal Gorbovsky, the head of the program, had secretly continued his work with the DHZ government masquerading as the Ravnui Ambassador. However, the Imaginary Numbers turn on Bal and reveal that the MIDAS used in the Philippines was a successful duplicate. Their leader, Lukav Minaev, also reveals that Emir and Alisa were also both created by the project, and that two scientists who adopted them as family helped them escape before they were killed.

The Imaginary Numbers flee to Japan where they support a coup d'état hatched by Masao Sasaki, the ultra-nationalist JDF Chief of Staff who ordered the Alaska raid. Kazuki's group follows them to Japan, where he is reunited with his estranged father Isao Takemura. They manage to defeat the coup forces, clear their names and pursue the Imaginary Numbers back to Ocean City, a floating island located off Okinawa. Although they finally defeat the Imaginary Numbers and safely detonate the original MIDAS out at sea, the game's ending will either be resolved or left ambiguous depending on the scenario chosen.

== Development and release ==
Front Mission 3 was developed by Development Division 6 of Square, led by Toshirou Tsuchida. It was the fifth entry in the series after the two mainline entries and two spin-off titles. Front Mission 3 was the first game produced in-house by Square, who had bought out and incorporated original developer G-Craft. Production lasted two years, with the team using their experience creating Front Mission 2 for the PlayStation to polish and improve on the gameplay experience. Akihiro Yamada acted as one of the game's artists. During production, several different characters went through multiple drafts, and some characters and concepts needed to be dropped. Kiyotaka Akaza acted as one of the programmers, while Ko Sato designed the battle system. As with other entries in the Front Mission series, the team consciously drew their inspirations from sources other than traditional mecha anime and manga. Its North American release was the first Front Mission title to release outside Japan.

=== Audio ===
The game's musical score, Front Mission 3 Original Soundtrack, was composed and arranged by Koji Hayama, Hayato Matsuo, and SHIGEKI. It was produced by Hayama and Matsuo. The soundtrack was released on September 22, 1999, by DigiCube and has not had a re-release since. It bears the catalog number SSCX-10035.

Hayama and Matsuo split the composition of the soundtrack, with the former composing 20 tracks and the latter 26 tracks, respectively. SHIGEKI has a sole contribution, the first track of disc one.

== Reception ==
Reception

Aggregate score
Aggregator	Score
GameRankings	84%

Review scores
Publication	Score
CNET Gamecenter	8/10
Electronic Gaming Monthly	9/10 (Note: In Electronic Gaming Monthly's review of the game, one critic gave it 9.5/10, another gave it 8.5/10, and the rest gave it each a score of 9/10.)
Eurogamer	8/10
Famitsu	32/40
Game Informer	9/10
GameFan	87%
GameRevolution	B−
GameSpot	8.3/10
GameSpy	90%
IGN	8.8/10
Next Generation	3/5
Official U.S. PlayStation Magazine	4.5/5
RPGamer	(2000) 9/10 (2015) 3.5/5
RPGFan	(Lee) 81% (Chu) 78%

The game received favorable reviews according to the review aggregation website GameRankings. In Japan, Famitsu gave it a score of 32 out of 40.

Yukiyoshi Ike Sato of GameSpot noted that the Japanese version may be a title worth introducing the franchise to American audiences, but criticized its graphics for being a notch lower than Front Mission 2. Sam Bishop of IGN lauded the game's battle mechanics as rare in other Square installments since Final Fantasy Tactics, but cited the graphics transitions between overhead play and individual battles as spotty. Derek Williams of AllGame gave it four stars out of five and said, "Front Mission 3's deep, strategic gameplay makes up for most any of the flaws. Chances are you'll be having so much fun with the strategic combat that you may not even pay attention to the story, or find yourself booting up the combat simulator more often than you advance the plot." Edge praised the missions for their varied objectives and special events, but criticized the game's limited tactical possibilities, giving it six out of ten and stating that "there's none of the learning progression of wargames that gradually release more sophisticated units and abilities, so it's simply a matter of grasping the basics and applying them over and over." Adam Pavlacka of NextGen called it "A solid game with some engaging RPG elements. Worth your time if you find the idea of realtime strategy exhausting." GamePro summed up the review by saying, "Even if you're not a fan of the genre, Front Mission 3 is sure to attract RPG and strategy enthusiasts alike." (Note: GamePro gave the game 4/5 for graphics, two 4.5/5 scores for sound and fun factor, and 5/5 for control.)

The game sold 298,342 units in Japan the year of its release.

It was a runner-up for GameSpot's annual "Best Strategy Game" award among console games, losing to Ogre Battle 64.

Front Mission 3 has been re-released a number of times in Japan. In 2000, the game re-released as part of Square's Millennium Collection, and included collectable goods such as a keychain penlight, key fobs, and a wallet and chain. In 2002, the game was re-issued as part of Sony's PSone Books line of best-sellers. The game was also packaged with both Front Mission and Front Mission 2 as part of the Front Mission History compilation in 2003. Finally, the game was re-released in 2006 as part of Square Enix's Ultimate Hits line. The game was re-released on the European PSN in September 2010 and on the North American PSN in December 2010.

=== Remake ===
The game's remake, Front Mission 3: Remake, was released for Nintendo Switch on June 26, 2025. Upon its release, it was heavily criticized by fans and reviewers for major use of generative AI in its textures and 2D art assets to save on development costs, resulting in odd, misshapen and wildly diverging art to the original game, with Alana Hagues of Nintendo Life commenting that the art looked "contorted" and that "fans are understandably not happy about this, especially given that the original game is beloved by many", adding to anger about the poor localization of the previous game.
