= Front Mission 2089 =

2005 video game

- Cover art for Front Mission 2089: Border of Madness, the remake of Front Mission 2089
- Developers: Square Enix, MSF, Winds, h.a.n.d.
- Publisher: Square Enix
- Composers: Yoko Shimomura; Noriko Matsueda; Koji Hayama; Hayato Matsuo; Hidenori Iwasaki; Ryo Yamazaki
- Series: Front Mission
- Platforms: Mobile phone Nintendo DS
- Release: JP: March 7, 2005 (i-mode); JP: October 27, 2005 (EZweb); JP: May 29, 2008 (Nintendo DS); JP: June 18, 2008 (Yahoo!)
- Genre: Tactical role-playing game
- Modes: Single-player, Multiplayer (Mobile phones only)

Front Mission 2089 (Note: Japanese: フロントミッション 2089, Hepburn: Furonto Misshon 2089) is a tactical role-playing game developed by Square Enix Co., Ltd., MSF, and Winds, and was published and released in Japan by Square Enix Co., Ltd. in 2005 and 2008 for mobile phones. The game was released on March 7, 2005 (i-mode services), October 27, 2005 (EZweb services), and June 18, 2008 (Yahoo! Mobile services). Front Mission 2089 is part of Front Mission Mobile, a project dedicated to Front Mission video games for the mobile phones. Front Mission 2089 is the fifth main entry and the seventh entry overall in the Front Mission series. Like other Front Mission titles, Front Mission 2089 is part of a serialized storyline that follows the stories of various characters and their struggles involving mecha known as wanzers. An enhanced remake of the game developed by h.a.n.d. was released for the Nintendo DS on May 29, 2008, titled Front Mission 2089: Border of Madness. A sequel, Front Mission 2089-II (フロントミッション 2089-II, Furonto Misshon 2089-II), was released for mobile phones in Japan in 2006 and 2008 for i-mode and EZweb services, respectively, continuing the story following a new main character.

== Gameplay ==
The player battles an enemy wanzer.

Front Mission 2089 borrows many of the gameplay mechanics found in Front Mission. The video game progresses in a linear manner: watch cut-scene events, complete missions, set up their wanzers during intermissions, and sortie for the next mission. Missions in Front Mission 2089 are traditional tactical RPG fare, ranging from destroying all enemy targets to protecting a particular allied target. Due to its mobile phone format, the story of Front Mission 2089 is told through episodic content; new episodes were released for download on the video game's official website on a bi-weekly basis. A returning feature in the game is the Arena. Like in Front Mission, players can fight other players to win monetary rewards. Mission rankings also make a return; based on the scoring system of Front Mission 3, players can earn new parts and wanzers by doing well during missions. Another returning feature is briefings. Lastly, players can choose to play two unique scenarios - one with the Oceania Cooperative Union (O.C.U.), and one with the United States of the New Continent (U.S.N.).

In the remake of the game Front Mission 2089: Border of Madness, numerous gameplay mechanics from other Front Mission entries were implemented in the game. The most significant of these additions is Links. Links is a unique ability that allows multiple units to provide offensive support to each other during Player Phase battles. Up to two units can be linked together to form one "link". All weapons can be used for linked actions. The linked units cannot use the same class of weapons though; if both use melee weapons, they cannot participate in a linked battle. They can only participate if one of the units equips another weapon class: short-range, long-range, or support fire weapons. The linked units must also be free to act on their turn, as using Links ends the turns of the involved participants. Other returning features include armor coating, mission branching, part sorting, and remodeling. Several weapon classes have also received changes - shotguns now fire multiple rounds per attack and rifles are now purely long-range weapons. The remake, however, does not have mission rankings or the option to play two scenarios.

== Story ==
Set in 2089, the story of Front Mission 2089 takes place on Huffman Island one year before the 2nd Huffman Conflict. A series of skirmishes across Huffman Island in 2086 causes chaos on the island. The O.C.U. and U.S.N. send in peacekeeping forces on their respective sides of the island to quell the violence. This conflict, known as the "Huffman Crisis", increased tensions between the two supranational unions. By 2089, both super-states increase their military presence on the island and begin hiring mercenaries from all over the world. These mercenaries were then sent on espionage and reconnaissance operations around Mail River - the border that divides the O.C.U. and U.S.N. territories on Huffman Island.

=== Plot ===
The plot of Front Mission 2089 revolves around a group of mercenaries led by Ernest J. Salinger. Given the codename "Storm", Ernest conducts sorties near Mail River. While many of the sorties involve basic reconnaissance and data collection, the mercenaries detect abnormalities by the border. Mercenaries hired by both sides begin mysteriously disappearing, and many of them were last sighted near Mail River. Unsure whether the mercenaries are deserting their duties or are truly disappearing, Storm's superior officer Falcon orders them to investigate these disappearances. During their investigations, Ernest and his group come across an unknown mercenary outfit known as the Vampires.

=== Characters ===
These are the recurring characters whose first appearance was in Front Mission 2089: Border of Madness, which is a remake of Front Mission 2089. The video game takes place from 2089 to 2093.

Ernest J. Salinger - Ernest J. Salinger is a former O.C.U. captain and a mercenary employed by the O.C.U. He was the part of the O.C.U. Ground Defense Force (O.C.U. GDF) 13th Battalion, B.A.T.S., but left the unit for unknown reasons. Salinger's mercenary codename is "Storm". Ernest also makes an appearance in Front Mission 2089-II.

Kate S. Houjou - Kate S. Houjou is a former operations coordinator and a mercenary working with the O.C.U. military. Her past line of work got her involved with the Central Intelligence Union (C.I.U.) on many intelligence operations. Houjou's mercenary codename is "Oddeye". Kate also makes an appearance in Front Mission 2089-II.

Lycov - Lycov is an engineer in the employ of weapons developer and medical conglomerate, Sakata Industries. Lycov worked with the company to create Bioneural Device-use models. His real name is "G. Lycov", but few know what the initial "G" stands for. Lycov also makes appearances in Front Mission 2089-II and Front Mission 2.

Stan Williams- Stan Williams is a former mixed martial arts champion and a mercenary working with the O.C.U. military. He won the Triple Crown of mixed martial arts, but left the sport in search of more "meaningful" work. Williams' mercenary codename is "Champ". Stan also makes an appearance in Front Mission 2089-II.

== Development ==
The game appeared in 2005 at the Computer Entertainment Software Association's "Tokyo Game Show". The graphics were thought to be good, with an "involved" story and extensive customization. The game was released on mobile phones with three chapters per month, a feature that would change on the Nintendo DS where it was rewritten to be more "linear", according to series producer Toshiro Tsuchida. The game, its remake, and its sequel did not include any new music, instead reusing music from prior games in the series, and there have not been any album releases of their music.

=== Remake ===
In fall 2007, Square Enix Co., Ltd. announced that it would be creating a remake of Front Mission 2089 on the Nintendo DS and named it Front Mission 2089: Border of Madness. The game's producer Koichiro Sakamoto indicated that a survey of the series fans showed that most did not play games on their cell phones, and so Square Enix decided to bring it to the Nintendo DS. This remake of Front Mission 2089 featured completely remade visuals, new character artwork, new cut-scene events, a rewritten story, new game scenarios, and new battle maps. Also incorporated in the game were touchscreen features and a revised interface for more intuitive touchpad controls. Likewise, various game play mechanics from other Front Mission entries such as armor coating and linked attacks were added to Front Mission 2089: Border of Madness. Multiplayer mode had to be dropped due to space issues on the Nintendo DS.

== Reception ==
As of September 30, 2008, Square Enix Co., Ltd. reported that Front Mission 2089: Border of Madness had sold 50,000 copies in their report of the first half of the fiscal year ending March 31, 2009. The game debuted at number 13 on the video game software charts in Japan its opening week.

== Sequel ==
Front Mission 2089-II is a tactical role-playing game developed by Square Enix, MSF, and Winds as a sequel to Front Mission 2089. It was published and released in Japan by Square Enix in 2006 and 2008 for mobile phones: September 15, 2006 for i-mode services and February 21, 2008 for EZweb services. Front Mission 2089-II is part of Front Mission Mobile, a project dedicated to Front Mission video games for the mobile phones, and is the seventh main entry and the tenth entry overall in the Front Mission series.

The plot of Front Mission 2089-II is a direct continuation of the previous game, revolving around a mercenary named Albert Masel. As a new recruit for the O.C.U. mercenary outfit Chariots, Albert is given the codename "Tornado" and assigned a role of an assault-type wanzer pilot. In the midst of a large investigation behind the mysterious disappearances of mercenaries on both sides, the Chariots are assigned by the Central Intelligence Unit (C.I.U.) to investigate the mercenary outfit known as the Vampires. During their investigations, Albert and the Chariots eventually discover a link between the Vampires and a medical entity known as the B Organization.

Front Mission 2089-II borrows many of the gameplay mechanics found in Front Mission 5: Scars of the War. The video game progresses in a linear manner: watch cut-scene events, complete missions, set up wanzers during intermissions, and sortie for the next mission. Missions in Front Mission 2089-II are traditional tactical RPG fare, ranging from destroying all enemy targets to protecting a particular allied target. Due to its mobile phone format, the story of Front Mission 2089-II is told through episodic content; new episodes can be downloaded on the video game's official website on a bi-weekly basis. A returning feature in the game is the Survival Simulator. Like in Scars of the War, players go through a set number of floors to collect parts and weapons that can be used in the game. Other returning features include armor coating, briefings, and flanking. Unlike Front Mission 2089, there is only one story scenario that can be played in the game.

As the game is modeled after Scars of the War, Front Mission 2089-II plays radically different from its direct predecessor. Each pilot has a clearly defined role in which they excel at, and are not particularly skilled at other roles. A pilot gains proficiency in their natural role faster than in non-specialist ones, and can learn the full skill set from the aforementioned role. For example, Albert Masel can only gain up to 50 levels towards the striker-type role, but can reach the level 99 maximum in his natural role as an assault-type pilot. Likewise, all weapon types have changed functionality and properties. Melee weapons cannot hit aerial targets, flamethrowers can discharge multiple rounds, rifles are now purely long-range weapons, bazookas can cause additional damage from their blast, etc. Ranged weapons are now subject to accuracy losses based on the distance between the target and the attacking unit. These changes help increase the strategic options available to the player during mission play.

Front Mission 2089-II was first showcased in playable form at Jump Festa 2007 as part of Square Enix's gaming line-up.
