= Front Mission: Online =

2005 video game

- Japanese cover art for Front Mission: Online
- Developer: Square Enix
- Publisher: Square Enix
- Director: Toshiro Tsuchida
- Producer: Toshiro Tsuchida
- Composer: Hidenori Iwasaki
- Series: Front Mission
- Platforms: PlayStation 2, Windows
- Release: PS2: JP: May 12, 2005; Windows: JP: December 8, 2005
- Genres: Massively multiplayer online game, Third-person shooter
- Mode: Multiplayer

Front Mission: Online (Note: Japanese: フロントミッション オンライン, Hepburn: Furonto Misshon Onrain) was a massively multiplayer online (MMO), third-person shooter video game developed by and published by Square Enix, and was released in Japan on May 12, 2005 for the PlayStation 2, and on December 8, 2005 for Windows. Like other Front Mission titles, Front Mission: Online is part of a serialized storyline that follows the stories of various characters and their struggles involving mecha known as wanzers. The game's servers were closed on May 31, 2008.

== Gameplay ==
As a massively multiplayer online (MMO), third-person shooter spin-off, the gameplay of Front Mission: Online differs from the tactical role-playing game entries of the numbered Front Mission titles. Rather than being played out on a grid-based map and using a turn-based structure, battles takes place in real-time on full 3D maps akin to Armored Core. The player controls a mech known as the Wanderpanzer, or wanzer. Players in Online can play alone, or in groups of up to 20 players. The game has built-in support for VoIP, which can be used to communicate with other players.

Game progression in Online works differently from other Front Mission entries. As an MMO, players have complete control over how they want to play the game. When a player creates an account, they will be asked to choose a side to fight for - the Oceania Cooperative Union (O.C.U.) or the United States of the New Continent (U.S.N.). Next, the player must create a character to play as; character creation in Online works similarly to character creation methods found in other MMOs. Once a character has been created, the player can then begin playing the game. There are two modes of play - PvE or PvP. In PvE mode, players do battle against enemies controlled by AI. In PvP mode, players do battle against other players of the game.

The PvE mode of Online is unique in that like the other Front Mission titles, there is a storyline that the player can play through. After the player completes a certain amount of missions, they can participate in military operations, which are a series of missions. These military operations progress the storyline. Furthermore, there are limited-time only operations which are open to all players. Unlike missions, military operations are one-time only events and cannot be replayed. The PvP mode of Online, on the other hand, does not have any story elements. Players pick a battle zone on Huffman Island and fight on it, with the winning side taking control of the zone. Battle zones affect the type of missions that a player can go through in PvE mode. For example, if a U.S.N. military base is captured by O.C.U. forces, U.S.N. players can take a mission to recapture it. Likewise, U.S.N. players can take a mission to defend the base if it was not captured. There are many types of missions, ranging from simple destruction requests to more complex reconnaissance ones.

When a player is not currently involved in a mission or military operation, they are stationed at military bases and supply camps on Huffman Island. In here, they can customize their wanzers, purchase battle gear for their pilots, form groups with other players, or fight other players in the Arena to earn extra money and parts. Players can also defect to the other side if their combat proficiency is at a certain level. Defecting players are demoted by one military rank and lose all of their items, except those that are equipped on their pilot and wanzer. Wanzer customization in Online works differently from other Front Mission titles in that the parts, auxiliary backpacks, and weapons the player can access is entirely dependent on their military ranking. Military rankings work in a progression-based fashion; players must complete missions and military operations to advance in rank. A player can also raise their rank by scoring kills on computer-controlled enemies or players fighting for the other side.

Missions aside, Online boasts other new features as well as returning ones, particularly from Front Mission Series: Gun Hazard and Front Mission Alternative. The game introduces many new auxiliary backpacks and weapon types. A new kind of auxiliary backpack is the stealth backpack; this protects a wanzer from being detected on enemy radar and/or can render the wanzer invisible to the naked eye if an optical stealth backpack is used. The burst bazooka is a bazooka fires multiple bazooka rounds in quick succession; it has a high damage output, but is offset by its slow reload times. There are also hybrid shield/weapons that have both an offensive and a defensive feature. Returning features in Online include remodeling and Cockpit Mode. Once a player has reached a certain rank, they can add upgrades to their parts and weapons to make them more effective. Cockpit Mode, which allows players to control the action in a first-person view, has been expanded to allow for zooming in and zooming out of the battle camera. This allows for precision aiming and shooting, which is ideal for weapons such as sniper rifles and bazookas.

== Story ==
=== Setting ===
Set in 2090, the story of Front Mission: Online takes place on Huffman Island, a fictional Pacific Ocean island roughly the size of Oahu, created by volcanic activity south of Mexico's west coast in 1995. In 2002, the land mass was classified as an island, and was ceded to United Nations control. However, in 2020, the United States of the New Continent (U.S.N.), a unification of North American and South American countries, made a bid for control of the island after withdrawing from the United Nations. The Oceania Cooperative Union (O.C.U.), a unification of Oriental Asian nations and Australia in 2025, disputed this claim when the two superpowers colonized the island in 2065. The tensions heated up and eventually led to the 1st Huffman Conflict in 2070, with Huffman Island being divided into two halves at the end of the war. An uneasy peace was maintained until the Huffman Crisis in 2086, when a series of skirmishes across Huffman Island causes chaos on the island. Tensions flared up once again and eventually led to war when the O.C.U. is blamed for inciting the Larcus Incident on June 3, 2090.

=== Plot ===
The plot of Front Mission: Online takes players from the beginning of the 2nd Huffman Conflict to its end in 2091. Unlike Front Mission, the game's plot covers both the minor and major events that occur during the war, such as the war-ending Operation Eagle Tears (coincidentally, this was also the final military operation, taking place from May 27 to May 31, 2008). Online revolves around four military units that play a major role in the war: the Chasm Owls (O.C.U.), Iron Hearts (O.C.U.), Proud Eagles (U.S.N.), and the 17th Mobile Company (U.S.N.). These four military units influence how the war turns out, from the early stages when the U.S.N. military was winning the war, to the later stages when the O.C.U. military begins using mercenary outfits. Throughout the game's service, players could fight alongside or against characters and groups from Front Mission. Additionally, characters from the other Front Mission entries made appearances in several missions or military operations as either allies or enemies.

=== Characters ===
These are the recurring characters whose first appearance was in Front Mission: Online. The video game takes place from 2090 to 2091.

Ellen Taylor is an O.C.U. officer in the employ of the O.C.U. reconnaissance unit, Chasm Owls. Ellen is deployed to the Mail River border on Huffman Island, and is engaged in espionage and reconnaissance activities against the U.S.N. Ellen also makes an appearance in Front Mission 2089: Border of Madness.

Ernest Miller is a U.S.N. officer involved with the U.S.N. Border Patrol Force. During the outbreak of the 2nd Huffman Conflict, Ernest was assigned to monitoring O.C.U. movements by the Mail River border. Ernest also makes an appearance in Front Mission First.

Yuji Kinoshita is an O.C.U. mechanic working with both the O.C.U. military and its hired mercenaries. Yuji is assigned a post on Huffman Island in 2089 to train new mercenary recruits on wanzer piloting and following O.C.U. military procedures. Yuji also makes an appearance in Front Mission 2089: Border of Madness.

== Development ==
Front Mission: Online is the third spin-off entry and the eighth entry overall in the Front Mission series. The game was played using Square Enix's online service PlayOnline. Registration for beta testing took place in Japan in late July 2004, with a three part testing phase taking place in Fall 2004, starting with combat, then balance and character development, and finally server load. On January 11, 2005 voice chat testing began, with phase one locating players with USB headsets and phase 2 testing the feature during gameplay. During the beta, the game proved so popular that in order to balance server load, players were allowed to defect from their in game faction and join other groups on other servers. On April 25, 2005, Square Enix announced the game would appear at E3 in May of that year. It was also showcased at the Tokyo Game Show in September 2005 along with several other Square Enix games. Front Mission: Online ended its services and was discontinued on May 31, 2008.

=== Music ===
Front Mission: Online was the third spin-off game in the series, and the eighth game released overall. Its soundtrack was primarily composed of arrangements of music from prior games in the series, though a few original tracks were composed by Hidenori Iwasaki. The arranged music covered every prior game with the exception of Gun Hazard, and was arranged by Iwasaki from the compositions of Iwasaki, Hayato Matsuo, Yoko Shimomura, Noriko Matsueda, Ryo Yamazaki, and Riow Arai. The music was published as a 35-track album by Square Enix on September 20, 2006. The 1:13:19 album has a catalog number of SQEX-10078. Chris Greening of Square Enix Music Online gave the album a poor review, calling it "a mediocre effort". He found the majority of the arrangements to be lackluster and unimaginative. Ben Schweitzer of RPGFan, however, was less harsh in his review of the album, calling it "a positive look at the entire series" and saying that the majority of it was good, though the original tracks were not particularly strong.

== Reception ==
The PS2 version of Front Mission: Online sold over 42,000 copies in Japan by the end of 2005. 1UP.com reviewers came away overwhelmed by the game during a preview at Square Enix Party 2005 due to the games complex controls and story. A "Front Mission Online Battle Stick" for Windows players was released in 2005. GameSpot gave generally positive feedback, describing how the game was successfully transforming the strategy game series into an action and combat based experience. GameSpy mentioned the game as one of Japan's prominent Windows games in a country that was primarily geared toward console game playing. In Square Enix 2006 Annual Report, Front Mission Online is cited as a reason for the companies 13% rise in their "Games: Online" segment over the previous year.
