= Front Mission 2 =

1997 video game

- Developer: G-Craft
- Publisher: Square
- Director: Toshiro Tsuchida
- Composer: Noriko Matsueda
- Series: Front Mission
- Platform: PlayStation
- Release: JP: September 25, 1997
- Genre: Tactical role-playing game
- Mode: Single-player

Front Mission 2, also known in Japan as Front Mission Second, (Note: Japanese: フロントミッション セカンド, Hepburn: Furonto Misshon Sekando) is a 1997 tactical role-playing game developed by G-Craft and published by Square for the PlayStation. It was released only in Japan on September 25, 1997. It is the second main installment and the third entry overall in the Front Mission series. Like other Front Mission titles, Front Mission 2 is part of a serialized storyline that follows the stories of various characters and their struggles involving mecha known as wanzers. The game was well received by critics and fans, and was part of Square Enix's "Ultimate Hits" collection in 2005.

A remake developed by Storm Trident for the Nintendo Switch, titled Front Mission 2: Remake (Japanese: フロントミッション セカンド：リメイク), was announced in 2022 and was originally set to be released by Forever Entertainment on June 12, 2023, but was delayed to October 5. Ports to Microsoft Windows, PlayStation 4, PlayStation 5, Xbox One and Xbox Series X/S were released on April 30, 2024.

== Gameplay ==
Front Mission 2 uses 3D models and a moving camera.

Front Mission 2 expands on the mechanics found in Front Mission. The video game progresses in a linear manner: watch cut-scene events, complete missions, set up their wanzers during intermissions, and sortie for the next mission. The player travels to locations on a point-and-click world map. As the player progresses through the plot, new locations are revealed on the world map. Towns and cities act as intermission points where the player can organize and set up their units for the upcoming mission. Battle zones are where the missions take place, though they become inaccessible upon the completion of a mission. A new element of progression in Front Mission 2 involves alternating scenarios between the game's three main characters. After reaching a certain point of the game, control switches over to a different group of characters for the next few missions. Towards the climax, all three scenarios merge for the remainder of Front Mission 2.

Front Mission 2 missions are traditional tactical RPG fare, ranging from destroying all enemy targets to protecting a certain allied target. There are a number of new main features that are used for mission play in Front Mission 2. Action Points (AP) is a feature that dictates how many actions can be done with each unit. Actions such as moving and attacking require a certain amount of AP to use. At the end of a full turn, which is one Player Phase and Enemy Phase, a set amount of AP is replenished. A unit's AP amount and recharge value increases as their pilots gain proficiency levels through destroying enemy targets. The Action Points feature ties into a second feature known as Honor. Moving around while allied units are nearby can result in statistical advantages such as increased AP charge or accuracy. In contrast, being surrounded by enemy units will result in statistical disadvantages such as decreased evasion or AP charge. By destroying enemy targets, a unit's pilot can gain Honor Points.

When enough Honor Points are accumulated, the aforementioned pilot will learn abilities that provide special benefits or detriments to nearby allied or enemy units; one of these abilities is Links. Links is a unique ability that allows two units to provide defensive support to each other during Enemy Phase battles. For linked actions, only melee weapons and short-range weapons can be used during a linked battle. As long as the linked units are within an eight-square radius of each other, they can participate in linked battles. Furthermore, the target of an enemy unit is protected entirely from their attack; the linked unit is hit by the attack instead during linked battles. Other new features for mission play include armor coating and flanking. Armor coating allows a unit to resist certain types of attacks, while flanking improves a unit's chances at hitting an enemy target.

Missions aside, there are several returning features from Front Mission that are expanded upon Front Mission 2. The Arena feature returns, which allows players to fight against the AI or against another player for monetary rewards. A new addition to the Arena is team matches, in which the player can field more than one wanzer to do battle with an opposing team. Briefings are also retained, and now operate differently. Instead of providing basic information on the enemy, briefings allow the player to review battle maps - enemy placements, allied units, and player starting positions can all be seen. Returning features aside, Front Mission 2 introduces the Network - a pseudo-Internet feature that allows the player to better understand the world of Front Mission through various websites and web pages.

== Story ==
The story takes place 12 years after Front Mission 1st. Set in June 2102, the game's story of takes place in Alordesh (modern-day Bangladesh), a member state for the Oceania Cooperative Union (OCU). The formation of the OCU in the early 21st century led to rapid industrialization of developing countries such as Bangladesh. During the 1st Huffman Conflict in 2070, Bangladesh's economic growth flourishes with the OCU because of many war factories in the country. However, the economic boom begins to slow down in 2080, with a loss of foreign investments and pullout of several businesses. Five years later, the OCU offers to provide Bangladesh with foreign aid, provided it joins the union. The Bangladeshi economy resurges briefly during the 2nd Huffman Conflict. Anti-OCU sentiments grew after the war and in 2094, Bangladesh renames itself as the "People's Republic of Alordesh". Four years later, the Alordeshi military staged a coup d'état. While the coup failed, it further increased anti-OCU support and led to a second coup in 2102.

=== Plot ===
The plot of Front Mission 2 revolves around three individuals from the OCU - Corporal Ash Faruk, Captain Thomas Norland, and intelligence officer Lisa Stanley. On June 12, 2102, the Alordeshi Armed Forces overthrows the pro-OCU government and subsequently declares independence from the OCU. Through a well-orchestrated plan, Alordeshi troops overwhelm the local OCU garrisons at their military bases in the country. In the midst of the chaos, Ash Faruk and members of the Muddy Otters unit attempt to flee the country. Along the way, they come across some OCU survivors led by Thomas Norland of the Dull Stags unit. Norland leads the survivors to the estate of Saribash Labra, the CEO of the transport business Burg Transportation. Saribash offers to help them escape by the seashore, the only part of Alordesh not controlled by the coup d'état forces. As the survivors head for the seashore, an OCU regiment lands in the country. Tasked with freeing POWs, Stanley leads a small unit to investigate the movements of the coup d'état forces.

Upon intercepting a transport helicopter, she learns of a detention center where OCU POWs are being held. Stanley succeeds in liberating the inmates and begins preparing for an operation to rescue Alordeshi government officials in Dhaka. A major battle breaks out in the city. The operation succeeds with some help from Norland and his subordinates, who opted to stay in the country and fight the coup forces. Meanwhile, aboard the OCU aircraft carrier Monto, Faruk is confronted by an officer from the OCU's Central Intelligence Unit. He reluctantly agrees to return to the country when the officer, Pike Reischauer, reveals that some of his colleagues in the Muddy Otters are still alive. Upon returning to Alordesh, they are pursued by coup leader Ven Mackarge. A link between Mackarge's pursuit of them, the OCU's liberation attempts, and Burg Transportation's involvement in the war is eventually formed when it is revealed that the coup forces are receiving support from an unknown third party, and are in possession of a device codenamed "FENRIR".

== Development ==
Front Mission 2 was developed by G-Craft, the company which had created and handled development of the original Front Mission. Series creator Toshiro Tsuchida acted as director. Production of Front Mission 2 ran parallel with the spin-off title Front Mission Alternative. During production, Tsuchida was approached by Square, who wanted to buy out and incorporate G-Craft into Square itself. This deal took place midway through development, with G-Craft being redubbed as Square's Development Division 6, making Front Mission 2 the last title produced under the G-Craft name. While the previous game was produced for the Super Famicom, publisher Square decided to shift production of all core titles from Nintendo's hardware to the in-production PlayStation.

=== Music ===
Front Mission 2 was composed by Noriko Matsueda, who also composed the original Front Mission. The Front Mission 2 Original Soundtrack was released by DigiCube on September 21, 1997, on a single 43-track disc.

== Release ==
According to the series' public relations manager Koichiro Sakamoto, the game was never released outside Japan due to the presence of situations and vocabulary which would be considered faux pas in North America.

Front Mission 2 was both a financial and critical success in Japan. The game sold 496,200 copies, making it the 18th-best-selling game of 1997. It received a "Gold Prize" from Sony in May 1998, indicating sales above 500,000 units in Japan.

The game was also later re-released alongside both Front Mission and Front Mission 3 as part of the Front Mission History compilation. This version included a Quick Battle option that allows players to progress through the game's story at a faster pace. It was released on PlayStation Network on December 24, 2008.

== Reception ==
Reception

Aggregate score
Aggregator	Score
Metacritic	Switch: 65/100

Review scores
Publication	Score
Consoles +	86/100
Famitsu	32/40
GameSpot	8.6/10
Joypad	92%
Ação Games	9/10
Gamers	4.7/5

Famitsu magazine awarded the game 32 out of 40 upon its release. The magazine chose the game as the 63rd best game on the original PlayStation. At the time of the re-release of Front Mission 2 under the Ultimate Hits line on October 5, 2006, the game sold over 510,000 copies in Japan.

Front Mission 2 has been criticized for its long loading times. A workaround for this technical flaw was added in the Ultimate Hits version of the game, which enables the ability to skip battle sequences.

=== Remake ===
The game is remade as Front Mission 2: Remake, released for Nintendo Switch on October 5, 2023, after previously delayed. Ports to Microsoft Windows, PlayStation 4, PlayStation 5, Xbox One and Xbox Series X/S were released on April 30, 2024.

The remake was applauded for modernizing the gameplay and the graphics of the original title, but was criticized due to poor English localization and mistypes.
