= Front Mission Alternative =

1997 video game

- Developer: Square
- Publisher: Square
- Director: Masanori Hara
- Producer: Shinji Hashimoto
- Artist: Ryuichiro Kutsuzawa
- Composer: Riow Arai
- Series: Front Mission
- Platforms: PlayStation, PlayStation Network
- Release: JP: December 18, 1997; JP: October 14, 2008 (PSN)
- Genre: Real-time strategy
- Mode: Single-player

Front Mission Alternative (Note: Japanese: フロントミッション オルタナティブ, Hepburn: Furonto Misshon Orutanatibu) is a real-time tactics video game developed and published by Square, and was released in Japan on December 18, 1997. Front Mission Alternative is the second spin-off entry and the fourth entry overall in the Front Mission series. Unlike other Front Mission titles, Front Mission Alternative is the precursor to the serialized storyline and features a completely standalone story and cast of characters.

== Gameplay ==
As a real-time strategy spin-off, the gameplay of Front Mission Alternative differs from the tactical role-playing game entries of the numbered Front Mission titles. Rather than being played out on a grid-based map and using a turn-based structure, battles takes place in real-time on full 3D maps. The player controls up to three platoons, each platoon consisting of three mecha - the wanderwagen, or WAW. During missions, they have complete control over where their platoons move, and what enemy platoons they can attack. Movement on the battlefield is done through waypoints; the player must select preset waypoints on the map in order to move their platoons. Player-controlled platoons can attack enemy targets along the way to the waypoints, or if they are ordered to attack the aforementioned targets.

Players can change the offensive and defensive tendencies of their platoons, as well as their targeting priority at any given time. Player units set to offensive maneuvers prefer to attack with ranged weapons. Player units set to defensive maneuvers, on the other hand, will use shields to block enemy fire and prefer to fight at close ranges. For targeting priority, player units can either focus on one target or attack any targets within range. On certain missions, players can request aid from a supply platoon to restock on supplies or a support fire platoon to rain artillery bombardment on the enemy. Lastly, the player can choose to withdraw their platoons from battle at any given time.

Unlike most Front Mission titles, failing a mission does not result in a game over. Players are allowed up to four attempts to complete a mission. Furthermore, players are allowed up to 20 mission failures overall before they receive a game over. Upon completing missions, players are graded on their performance through a new mission ranking system. Based on how well they met the mission objectives, the player can receive monetary and part rewards. The money earned from missions can then be used to purchase new parts to be used by WAWs in combat. Mission rankings are tied to another new feature - mission branching. Based on how well or poorly the player performs in specific missions, they can unlock new story scenarios to play and new endings to view.

The range system affects battles in that distance is factored into weapon accuracy and a unit's evasive maneuvers. The farther away a target is from the attacking unit, the less likely its weapons will hit it. Likewise, a unit will be unable to evade incoming fire if it's attacked at close ranges. Auxiliary backpacks are no longer restricted to storage and generator types; there are new backpacks which possess unique features. These include: anti-missile guns, night vision sensors, vernier packs, flare dispensers, radar antennas, and ECM devices. Cockpit Mode allows the player to view battles from inside the WAW cockpit; this mode grants greater control of the action and operates similar to a first-person shooter.

Game progression in Alternative is done in linear manner: watch cut-scene events, complete missions, set up WAWs during intermissions, and sortie for the next mission. Briefings from Front Mission and Front Mission 2 can also be reviewed during intermissions. Alternative expands on this feature significantly: briefings now reveal enemy threats, mission objectives, and topography conditions, using pictures to illustrate these details. The player can also run simulations of their strategies on a 3D map of the mission. The player travels to locations on a world map. As the player progresses through the plot, new locations are revealed on the world map.

The game supports control through the PlayStation Mouse.

== Story ==
Set in 2034, the story of Front Mission Alternative takes place in Africa. In the early 21st century, nations around the world form regional entities to combat a global recession and other crises. While many regions thrive under their newly formed supranational unions, the nations of Africa fall deeper into environmental, racial, and ethnic conflicts. In an attempt to help them, the European Community (EC) and the Oceania Cooperative Union (OCU) assisted the African countries in forming a continental alliance called the Organization of African Consolidation (OAC). Although it initially thrives in the first three years, disputes flare up between the OAC's five regional blocs - the Union of Northern African States (UNAS), the South African United States (SAUS), the Community of Central African States (CA), the East African Communities (EA), and the West African States Community Union (WA). Tensions rise and with diplomatic efforts failing, the nations go to war, leading to the outbreak of the African Conflict.

=== Plot ===
The plot of Front Mission Alternative revolves around the Independent Mobile Assault Company (IMAC), a special joint unit of soldiers from the OCU and the SAUS led by OCU Ground Defense Force 2nd Lt Earl McCoy. The SAUS government deploys the IMAC to stop the civil conflicts in its territory and in the other blocs. Piloting a new bipedal weapons platform called the wanderwagen or WAW, the IMAC successfully quells the violence across the continent. As they travel north to support the Western African Liberation Front, the company starts encountering unknown WAWs and WAW-vehicle hybrids known as "mobile weapons" being used by terrorist forces. The EC intervenes through the deployment of an elite anti-terrorism unit, but appear to be aiding the UNAS in prolonging the war. As the IMAC starts fighting their way into UNAS territory, they uncover connections between the terrorist uprisings, civil conflicts, the true cause of the war, and how the EC factors into the situation.

=== Characters ===
The game's main character is Bruce Blakewood, an O.C.U. lieutenant and a member of the Independent Mobile Assault Company (IMAC) in the years 2034 to 2035. Bruce was sent to the O.A.C. to fight in the African Conflict. He is the father of Willas E. Blakewood, and the grandfather of Natalie F. Blakewood. Bruce is also referenced in Front Mission: Online.

== Development ==
The game was developed at the same time as Front Mission 2. Alternative was created in order to recoup the costs of that game's development. The music of Front Mission Alternative was done by DJ Riow Arai. A preview of the game was shown off at the 1997 Tokyo Game Show.

== Release ==
The game was released on December 18, 1997 in Japan for the Sony PlayStation. Front Mission Alternative sold over 160,000 copies in Japan. It was listed as number 6 on Famitsu's top selling games list for the week of January 15 to the 21st in 1998. It was re-released in Japan as part of Square Enix Co., Ltd's Ultimate Hits line on October 5, 2007. The game was made available on the PlayStation Store game platform in October 2008 and was made available to those outside Japan for the first time.

== Reception ==
Reception

Review scores
Publication	Score
GameSpot	6.8/10
Super GamePower	5/5
Joypad	79%

Greg Kasavin of GameSpot praised the graphics and audio experience, but criticized the game for being too short and rewarding players with more elaborate story sections if they failed to achieve game missions, indirectly rewarding failure. He also called the soundtrack "a bunch of dizzying techno that doesn't suit the onscreen grandeur". Hardcore Gaming 101 noted it was not a very deep real time strategy game, but praised its branching stories and variety of endings.
