= List of Square Enix compilation albums =

Square Enix is a Japanese video game developer and publisher formed from the merger on April 1, 2003, of video game developer Square and publisher Enix. The company is best known for its role-playing video game franchises, which include the Final Fantasy series, the Dragon Quest series, and the action-RPG Kingdom Hearts series. For many of its games, Square Enix has produced albums of music containing songs from those games or arrangements of those songs. In addition to those albums, it has produced several compilation albums containing music from multiple games or series made by the company. These albums include music directly from the games, as well as arrangements covering a variety of styles, such as orchestral, piano, vocal, and techno. This list includes albums produced by Square, Enix, or Square Enix which contain music from multiple games in the companies' catalog which are not a part of a single series. The first of these was Personal Computer Music by Enix in 1987. Dozens of albums have been published since, primarily through Square Enix's own record label.

Several of the albums have sold well, placing on the Japanese Oricon Albums Chart. Drammatica: The Very Best of Yoko Shimomura reached position 179, as did SQ Chips. SQ Chips 2 reached position 102, Love SQ reached 176, Chill SQ reached 236, Symphonic Fantasies reached 102, More SQ reached 107, Cafe SQ reached 134, Battle SQ reached 72, and Beer SQ reached position 81. The music on the compilation albums was originally composed by numerous composers. Among those well-represented are Nobuo Uematsu, long-time composer of the Final Fantasy series; Masashi Hamauzu, composer of various Final Fantasy, Chocobo, and SaGa games; Yasunori Mitsuda, composer for the Chrono series and Xenogears; Kenji Ito, who composed for several SaGa and Mana games, and Yoko Shimomura, composer for the Kingdom Hearts series.

== Albums ==
Albums
| Title | Games | Date | Length | Label | Ref. |
|---|---|---|---|---|---|
| Personal Computer Music | Gandhara, Jesus: Kyōfu no Bio Monster, Wingman II | June 21, 1987 | 53:18 | Apollon | |
| Enix Game Music | Animal Land Satsujin Jiken, Door Door MK II, The Earth Fighter Rayieza, Jesus: Kyōfu no Bio Monster, Wingman, Wingman II, World Golf, World Golf II, Zarth | October 25, 1987 | 44:33 | Alfa | |
| Square Vocal Collection | The Bouncer, Chocobo Racing, Chrono Cross, Dice de Chocobo, Final Fantasy VIII, Final Fantasy IX, Legend of Mana, Parasite Eve, Sōkaigi, Xenogears | June 21, 2001 | 1:00:43 | DigiCube | |
| Radiata Stories Tri-Ace Sound Battle Collection | Radiata Stories, Star Ocean, Star Ocean: The Second Story, Star Ocean: Blue Sphere, Star Ocean: Till the End of Time, Valkyrie Profile | January 27, 2005 | 27:55 | Square Enix | |
| Square Enix Music Compilation Vol. 1 | Chocobo's Mysterious Dungeon, Chrono Trigger, Code Age Commanders, Final Fantasy II, Final Fantasy VII, Final Fantasy VII: Advent Children, Final Fantasy VIII, Final Fantasy IX, Final Fantasy X, Final Fantasy XI, Final Fantasy Tactics, Final Fantasy Tactics Advance, Front Mission 4, Front Mission 5: Scars of the War, Legend of Mana, SaGa Frontier, SaGa Frontier 2, Sword of Mana, Threads of Fate, Vagrant Story, Xenogears | 2006 | 59:41 | Square Enix | |
| Square Enix Music Powered Vol. 1 | Chrono Trigger, Final Fantasy IV, Final Fantasy VI, Final Fantasy VIII, Higurashi When They Cry, King's Knight, Legend of Mana | June 22, 2006 | 1:06:23 | Square Enix | |
| Square Enix Music Powered Vol. 2 | Children of Mana, Final Fantasy IX, Final Fantasy Legend II, Romancing SaGa 2, Romancing SaGa 3, Romancing SaGa -Minstrel Song-, SaGa Frontier | August 22, 2006 | 1:10:26 | Square Enix | |
| Square Enix Music Powered Vol. 3 | Final Fantasy VII, Final Fantasy X-2, Front Mission, Hanjuku Hero, Legend of Mana, Parasite Eve | October 21, 2006 | 1:00:23 | Square Enix | |
| Square Enix Music Powered Vol. 4 | Crystal Dragon, Final Fantasy V, Final Fantasy X, Musashi: Samurai Legend, SaGa Frontier 2, Xenogears | December 22, 2006 | 1:05:53 | Square Enix | |
| Square Enix Music Powered Vol. 5 | 3-D WorldRunner, Dawn of Mana, Final Fantasy VII, Final Fantasy XII, Vagrant Story | February 22, 2007 | 58:16 | Square Enix | |
| Square Enix Battle Tracks Vol. 1 | Bahamut Lagoon, Chrono Trigger, Final Fantasy, Final Fantasy II, Final Fantasy III, Final Fantasy IV, Final Fantasy V, Final Fantasy VI, Final Fantasy Adventure, The Final Fantasy Legend, Final Fantasy Legend II, Final Fantasy Legend III, Final Fantasy Mystic Quest, Front Mission, Front Mission Series: Gun Hazard, Hanjuku Hero, Live A Live, Romancing SaGa, Romancing SaGa 2, Romancing SaGa 3, Rudra no Hihō, Secret of Mana, Seiken Densetsu 3, Treasure Hunter G | May 9, 2007 | 1:09:29 | Square Enix | |
| Square Enix Music Compilation Vol. 2 | Before Crisis: Final Fantasy VII, Dawn of Mana, Einhänder, Final Fantasy III (Nintendo DS), Final Fantasy IV (Nintendo DS), Final Fantasy Crystal Chronicles: Ring of Fates, Final Fantasy Fables: Chocobo's Dungeon, Final Fantasy Tactics A2: Grimoire of the Rift, Front Mission Alternative, Front Mission: Online, Heroes of Mana, Last Order: Final Fantasy VII, Legend of Mana, Live A Live, Project Sylpheed, SaGa Frontier 2, Star Ocean: First Departure, The World Ends with You | 2008 | 41:41 | Square Enix | |
| Drammatica: The Very Best of Yoko Shimomura | Final Fantasy Versus XIII, Front Mission, Heroes of Mana, Kingdom Hearts, Legend of Mana, Live A Live | March 26, 2008 | 59:45 | Square Enix | |
| Square Enix × Xbox 360 Sound Collections | Infinite Undiscovery, The Last Remnant, Star Ocean: The Last Hope | September 11, 2008 | 33:05 | Square Enix | |
| Square Enix Music Compilation Vol. 3 | Chocobo Racing, Chocobo to Mahou no Ehon: Majou to Shoujo to Gonin no Yuusha, Dissidia Final Fantasy, Final Fantasy II, Final Fantasy IV (Nintendo DS), Final Fantasy XI, Final Fantasy Crystal Chronicles: Echoes of Time, Final Fantasy Fables: Chocobo Tales, Infinite Undiscovery, The Last Remnant, Sigma Harmonics, Star Ocean: Second Evolution, Star Ocean: The Last Hope, Valkyrie Profile: Covenant of the Plume, The World Ends with You | 2009 | 46:14 | Square Enix | |
| Love SQ | Chrono Trigger, Final Fantasy, Final Fantasy II, Final Fantasy III, Final Fantasy V, Final Fantasy VI, Final Fantasy VII, Legend of Mana, Romancing SaGa | November 25, 2009 | 53:22 | Square Enix | |
| Chill SQ | Final Fantasy IV, Final Fantasy V, Final Fantasy VI, Final Fantasy Adventure, The Final Fantasy Legend, Front Mission, Live A Live | May 26, 2010 | 34:49 | Square Enix | |
| Square Enix Battle Tracks Vol. 2 | Another Mind, Brave Fencer Musashi, Bushido Blade 2, Chocobo's Mysterious Dungeon, Chocobo's Mysterious Dungeon 2, Ehrgeiz, Einhänder, Final Fantasy VII, Front Mission 2, Front Mission Alternative, Parasite Eve, SaGa Frontier, Sōkaigi, Tobal No. 1, Tobal 2, Xenogears | September 15, 2010 | 46:12 | Square Enix | |
| Square Enix Battle Tracks Vol. 3 | Chocobo Racing, Chrono Cross, Cyber Org, Final Fantasy VIII, Final Fantasy IX, Front Mission 3, iS – internal section, Legend of Mana, Parasite Eve II, Racing Lagoon, SaGa Frontier 2, Threads of Fate, Vagrant Story | September 15, 2010 | 41:28 | Square Enix | |
| Symphonic Fantasies - Music From Square Enix | Chrono Cross, Chrono Trigger, Final Fantasy, Final Fantasy II, Final Fantasy V, Final Fantasy VI, Final Fantasy VII, Kingdom Hearts, Kingdom Hearts II, Kingdom Hearts II: Final Mix, Secret of Mana | September 15, 2010 | 1:12:30 | Square Enix | |
| X'mas Collections Music From Square Enix | Chocobo's Mysterious Dungeon, Chrono Trigger, Final Fantasy VII, Final Fantasy XI, Legend of Mana, Live A Live, SaGa Frontier 2 | November 24, 2010 | 29:43 | Square Enix | |
| More SQ | Chrono Trigger, Final Fantasy, Final Fantasy II, Final Fantasy V, Final Fantasy VI, Final Fantasy VIII, Final Fantasy IX, Live A Live, Nier, SaGa Frontier 2 | March 2, 2011 | 1:00:49 | Square Enix | |
| Guitar Solo Square Enix Official Best Collection CD Book | Chrono Cross, Chrono Trigger, Final Fantasy, Final Fantasy II, Final Fantasy III, Final Fantasy V, Final Fantasy VI, Final Fantasy VII, Final Fantasy IX, Final Fantasy X, Final Fantasy XIII, Final Fantasy XIV, Final Fantasy Adventure, Legend of Mana, Live A Live, Nier, Secret of Mana, Seiken Densetsu 3, Star Ocean: The Second Story, Romancing SaGa, Romancing SaGa 3, Threads of Fate, Valkyrie Profile, Xenogears | June 15, 2011 | 54:08 | KMP Music Publishing | |
| Square Enix Sound Effect Collection | Final Fantasy, Final Fantasy II, Final Fantasy III, Final Fantasy Adventure, The Final Fantasy Legend, Final Fantasy Legend II, Final Fantasy Legend III, Hanjuku Hero | July 16, 2011 | 7:22 | Square Enix | |
| SQ Chips Preview Mini | Final Fantasy III, Final Fantasy IX, Secret of Mana | July 16, 2011 | 17:11 | Square Enix | |
| SQ Chips | Brave Fencer Musashi, Chrono Trigger, Einhänder, Final Fantasy III, Final Fantasy IV, Final Fantasy V, Final Fantasy VI, Final Fantasy VII, Final Fantasy VIII, Final Fantasy XI, Final Fantasy XII, Final Fantasy XIII, Final Fantasy Adventure, Final Fantasy Legend II, Nanashi no Game, Project Sylpheed, Secret of Mana, Xenogears | September 21, 2011 | 1:18:27 | Square Enix | |
| SQ Chips Village/Vanguard Customer Bonus | Brave Fencer Musashi, Final Fantasy, Final Fantasy II, Final Fantasy V, Final Fantasy IX | September 21, 2011 | 14:15 | Square Enix | |
| Cafe SQ | Chrono Cross, Chrono Trigger, Final Fantasy, Final Fantasy IV, Final Fantasy V, Final Fantasy VI, Final Fantasy VII, Final Fantasy IX, Final Fantasy X, Romancing SaGa 2, Threads of Fate, Xenogears | November 23, 2011 | 1:14:15 | Square Enix | |
| SQ Lovers | Chrono Trigger, Final Fantasy, Final Fantasy III, Final Fantasy V, Final Fantasy VI, Final Fantasy VII, Final Fantasy XIII, Final Fantasy Adventure, Front Mission, Live A Live, Romancing SaGa | November 23, 2011 | 25:50 | Square Enix | |
| Battle SQ | Chocobo's Mysterious Dungeon, Chrono Trigger, Final Fantasy, Final Fantasy IV, Final Fantasy IX, The Final Fantasy Legend, Final Fantasy Tactics, Live A Live, Romancing SaGa 2, Rudra no Hihō, SaGa Frontier 2, Seiken Densetsu 3, Sigma Harmonics | July 4, 2012 | 1:09:44 | Square Enix | |
| Battle SQ (Limited Edition) | Chocobo's Mysterious Dungeon, Chrono Trigger, Final Fantasy, Final Fantasy IV, Final Fantasy VIII, Final Fantasy IX, The Final Fantasy Legend, Final Fantasy Tactics, Live A Live, Romancing SaGa 2, Rudra no Hihō, SaGa Frontier 2, Seiken Densetsu 3, Sigma Harmonics | July 4, 2012 | 1:53:31 | Square Enix | |
| Beer SQ | Chrono Trigger, Final Fantasy, Final Fantasy VI, Final Fantasy VII, Live A Live, SaGa Frontier 2, Seiken Densetsu 3 | July 4, 2012 | 40:30 | Square Enix | |
| Beer SQ (Limited Edition) | Chrono Trigger, Final Fantasy, Final Fantasy VI, Final Fantasy VII, Live A Live, SaGa Frontier 2, Seiken Densetsu 3, Unlimited Saga | July 4, 2012 | 1:34:19 | Square Enix | |
| SQ Chips 2 | Bahamut Lagoon, Chrono Cross, Dissidia Final Fantasy, Final Fantasy, Final Fantasy V, Final Fantasy VII, Final Fantasy X, Final Fantasy Tactics, Legend of Mana, Live A Live, Parasite Eve, Tobal No. 1, Vagrant Story, Xenogears | July 25, 2012 | 57:27 | Square Enix | |
| SQ Chips 2 Tower Records Bonus CD | Crisis Core: Final Fantasy VII, Final Fantasy IV, Final Fantasy VI, Secret of Mana | July 25, 2012 | 20:19 | Square Enix | |
| SQ Chips 2 Village/Vanguard Customer Bonus CD | Final Fantasy IV, Final Fantasy VI, Final Fantasy VII, Final Fantasy XIII | July 25, 2012 | 20:06 | Square Enix | |
| Symphonic Fantasies Tokyo - Music From Square Enix | Chrono Cross, Chrono Trigger, Final Fantasy, Final Fantasy II, Final Fantasy V, Final Fantasy VI, Final Fantasy VII, Kingdom Hearts, Kingdom Hearts II, Kingdom Hearts II: Final Mix, Secret of Mana | September 20, 2012 | 1:20:50 | Square Enix | |
| Square Enix Sound Effect Collection 2 | Bahamut Lagoon, Chrono Trigger, Final Fantasy IV, Final Fantasy V, Final Fantasy VI, Front Mission, Front Mission Series: Gun Hazard, Hanjuku Hero: Aa, Sekaiyo Hanjukunare...!, Live A Live, Romancing SaGa, Romancing SaGa 2, Romancing SaGa 3, Rudra no Hihō, Secret of Mana, Seiken Densetsu 3, Treasure Hunter G | September 20, 2012 | 11:17 | Square Enix | |
| Square Enix Sound Effect Collection Artnia Limited Edition | Chocobo Racing, Chocobo's Mysterious Dungeon, Final Fantasy VI, Final Fantasy VII, Final Fantasy VIII, Final Fantasy IX, Final Fantasy X, Final Fantasy XI, Final Fantasy XII, Final Fantasy XIII, Final Fantasy XIII-2, Final Fantasy XIV | April 26, 2013 | 11:01 | Square Enix | |
| Square Enix Composers Best/Selection Black Disk | Brave Fencer Musashi, Crisis Core: Final Fantasy VII, Final Fantasy VII: Advent Children, Final Fantasy X, Final Fantasy XI, Final Fantasy XIII, Final Fantasy Crystal Chronicles: The Crystal Bearers, Final Fantasy Type-0, Hanjuku Hero 4: 7-Jin no Hanjuku Hero, The Last Remnant, Monster x Dragon, Sigma Harmonics, Unlimited Saga, The World Ends with You | September 18, 2013 | 1:02:44 | Square Enix | |
| Compi de Chocobo | Chocobo's Mysterious Dungeon, Chocobo's Mysterious Dungeon 2, Chocobo Racing, Final Fantasy II, Final Fantasy III, Final Fantasy IV, Final Fantasy V, Final Fantasy VI, Final Fantasy VII, Final Fantasy VIII, Final Fantasy IX, Final Fantasy X, Final Fantasy XI, Final Fantasy XII, Final Fantasy XIII, Final Fantasy XIII-2, Final Fantasy XIV, Final Fantasy Adventure, Final Fantasy Crystal Chronicles: The Crystal Bearers, Final Fantasy Fables: Chocobo's Dungeon, Final Fantasy Fables: Chocobo Tales, Final Fantasy Legends: Hikari to Yami no Senshi, Final Fantasy Type-0, Lightning Returns: Final Fantasy XIII | September 21, 2013 | 2:13:01 | Square Enix | |
| Square Enix Sound Effect Collection 3 | Another Mind, Bushido Blade, Chocobo's Mysterious Dungeon, Chocobo Racing, Chrono Cross, Final Fantasy VII, Final Fantasy VIII, Final Fantasy IX, Final Fantasy Tactics, Front Mission 2, Front Mission 3, Legend of Mana, Racing Lagoon, SaGa Frontier, SaGa Frontier II, Threads of Fate, Vagrant Story, Xenogears | September 21, 2013 | 13:43 | Square Enix | |
| X'mas Collections II Music From Square Enix | Final Fantasy III, Final Fantasy IV, Final Fantasy XI, Front Mission Series: Gun Hazard, SaGa Frontier II, Sigma Harmonics, The 3rd Birthday, Threads of Fate | November 27, 2013 | 44:53 | Square Enix | |
| Cure SQ | Romancing SaGa, The Final Fantasy Legend, Final Fantasy V, Final Fantasy VI, Final Fantasy, Final Fantasy IV, Live A Live, Chrono Trigger | December 11, 2013 | 32:40 | Square Enix | |
| memória! ~ The Very Best of Yoko Shimomura | Demons' Score, Final Fantasy XV, Front Mission, Heroes of Mana, Kingdom Hearts, Kingdom Hearts 358/2 Days, Legend of Mana, Live A Live, Parasite Eve, Super Mario RPG | March 26, 2014 | 1:03:38 | Square Enix | |
| SQ Swing | Chrono Trigger, Secret of Mana, Kingdom Hearts II, Final Fantasy VI, Final Fantasy IV, SaGa Frontier, Live A Live, Final Fantasy IX, Xenogears | May 28, 2014 | 54:59 | Square Enix | |
| Square Enix Jazz Vol.2 | Final Fantasy Legend II, Final Fantasy VI, Nier, Legend of Mana, Chrono Trigger, Final Fantasy XII, Seiken Densetsu 3, NieR: Automata, Final Fantasy XV, Romancing SaGa 2 | December 12, 2018 | | Square Enix | |
| The World is Square | Final Fantasy IV, Secret of Mana, Chrono Trigger, Final Fantasy VI, Final Fantasy VII | February 14, 2019 | | Scarlet Moon Records | |
| Square Enix Acoustic Arrangements | Final Fantasy Legend III, Final Fantasy IV, Final Fantasy V, Final Fantasy VI, Romancing SaGa, Romancing SaGa 2, Romancing SaGa 3, Secret of Mana, Trials of Mana, Live a Live, Chrono Trigger, Bahamut Lagoon | October 2, 2019 | | Square Enix | |
| Square Enix Music Chips Selection | Final Fantasy VII, Final Fantasy VIII, Final Fantasy IX, Final Fantasy X, Final Fantasy XI, Final Fantasy XIV, Romancing SaGa, Nier, Nier: Automata, Octopath Traveler | October 31, 2019 | | Square Enix | |
| Square Enix Chill Out Arrangement Tracks - Around 80's Mix | Final Fantasy, Final Fantasy II, Final Fantasy Adventure, SaGa, SaGa 2, SaGa 3 | August 19, 2020 | | Square Enix | |
| Symphonic Memories Concert - music from Square Enix | Final Fantasy VIII, Final Fantasy XV, Xenogears, Octopath Traveller | September 24, 2020 | | Square Enix | |
| Square Enix Jazz -SaGa- | SaGa series | March 17, 2021 | | Square Enix | |
| Opening Tracks 1987-1996 | Final Fantasy series, SaGa series, Hanjuku Hero, SaGa series, Chrono Trigger, Live a Live, Front Mission, Treasure Hunter G | September 30, 2021 | | Square Enix | |
| Preserved Tracks Collection from 1986～1996 | Alpha, King's Knight, Crystal Dragon | September 30, 2021 | | Square Enix | |
| Square Enix - Mellow Minstrel Mix | Final Fantasy series, Mana series, Nier, Chrono Trigger | March 9, 2022 | | Square Enix | |
| Square Enix - Airship Cruise Beats | Final Fantasy series, Mana series, Nier, Chrono Trigger | March 9, 2022 | | Square Enix | |
| Square Enix - Mellow Minstrel Mix Vol. 2 | Final Fantasy series, Mana series, Nier, Chrono Trigger | October 26, 2022 | | Square Enix | |
| Square Enix - Airship Cruise Beats Vol. 2 | Final Fantasy series, Mana series, Nier, Chrono Trigger | October 26, 2022 | | Square Enix | |
| Mellow Minstrel Mix and Airship Cruise Beats - Chill DJ Mix / EDM DJ Mix | Final Fantasy series, Mana series, Nier, Chrono Trigger | September 25, 2023 | | Square Enix | |
| Square Enix - Mellow Minstrel Mix Vol. 3 | Final Fantasy series, Mana series, Nier, Chrono Trigger | February 21, 2024 | | Square Enix | |
| Square Enix - Airship Cruise Beats Vol. 3 | Final Fantasy series, Mana series, Nier, Chrono Trigger | February 21, 2024 | | Square Enix | |
| Square Enix Standards: Vocal | Final Fantasy series, Mana series, Nier series, Bravely Default series, Octopath Traveller series, SaGa series, Chrono Cross, Live A Live | September 26, 2024 | | Square Enix | |
| Square Enix Vocal Covers - Timeless Classics | Final Fantasy series, Nier series | June 25, 2025 | | Square Enix | |
| Guitar Cover Collection from Square Enix Music Channel | Final Fantasy series, Legend of Mana, Xenogears, Nier series, SaGa series, Live A Live | September 24, 2025 | | Square Enix | |
| Square Enix Vocal Covers - Timeless Classics Vol.2 | Final Fantasy series, Xenogears | February 18, 2026 | | Square Enix | |
| SQ Relax - Krystell's Chillwave | Final Fantasy series, Xenogears, SaGa series, Chrono series, Nier series, Mana series, Live A Live | March 4, 2026 | | Square Enix | |
