= Threads of Fate =

1999 video game

- North American box art
- Developer: Square
- Publishers: JP: Square; NA: Square Electronic Arts
- Director: Koji Sugimoto
- Producer: Hiromichi Tanaka
- Designers: Haruyuki Nishida; Takeo Fujii
- Programmers: Koji Sugimoto; Masaki Kobayashi
- Artists: Tsutomu Terada; Tadahiro Usuda; Hiroyuki Nagamine
- Writers: Daisuke Watanabe; Makoto Shimamoto
- Composer: Junya Nakano
- Platform: PlayStation
- Release: JP: October 14, 1999; NA: July 18, 2000
- Genre: Action role-playing
- Mode: Single-player

Threads of Fate (Note: Known in Japan as Dewprism (Japanese: デュープリズム, Hepburn: Dyūpurizumu).) is an action role-playing game developed and published by Square for the PlayStation, released for Japan in 1999 and for North America in 2000. The story is split between two protagonists in search of an ancient relic said to grant any wish; the amnesiac Rue who seeks to revive a dead friend, and the banished princess Mint who dreams of conquering the world. Gameplay focuses on action-based combat while exploring dungeon levels featuring minor platforming elements.

Beginning development in 1998, director and programmer Koji Sugimoto wanted a light-hearted game to contrast against his work on Xenogears. The team also aimed for a fully 3D game without pre-rendered cutscenes, which was a challenge on PlayStation hardware. The script was written by Daisuke Watanabe based on a world design by Makoto Shimamoto, and the music was composed by Junya Nakano. The game received generally positive reviews for its combat and graphics, but was a commercial disappointment. Several team members cited the game as influencing their later work.

== Gameplay ==
Threads of Fate protagonist Rue navigates a dungeon.

Threads of Fate is an action role-playing game in which players take on the role of dual protagonists Rue and Mint. The playable character is selected at the start of the game. Both campaigns take place in the environments around the hub town Carona, with all environments and characters rendered using 3D graphics. The game is split between Carona and its connected areas, and dungeon environments which unlock during the story.

Characters have basic movement, a jump which can be used in minor platforming sections, and two action buttons which trigger different attack combinations in real-time. The camera angle is generally fixed in an overhead perspective, but can be adjusted in some dungeon areas. Each character has health points (HP) and magic points (MP). Rather than an experience point-based leveling system, HP and MP are raised through usage in combat; HP rises based on damage taken, and MP on the number of times magic is used. Enemies when defeated can drop items and different types of coins.

Both characters have unique combat and gameplay abilities. Rue can collect up to five coins from defeated monsters, allowing him to transform into them and access their abilities. Mint uses dual rings as both melee and projectile weapons, and can combine magic spells with complementary elemental abilities. Each character has unique puzzles related to their abilities, with obstacles changing to fit the character for each playthrough. Monster coins and other collectables can be sold for in-game currency in Carona, which is also where players save their game. Carona also features an item shop, a hostel where characters can recover HP, and a chapel where donations can alter elements within the game. In dungeons, HP and MP is restored with respective bottles dropped by defeated enemies.

If character health is reduced to zero, players meet a game over screen. They can either restart from an earlier save, return to Carona at a cost of half their items, or restart immediately with new attributes by consuming a Coin of Life. After completing a campaign, a version of New Game+ allows unlocked abilities to carry over from older playthroughs and unlock secret areas. Within each campaign there are also unique mini-games which can unlock bonus items.

== Synopsis ==
Threads of Fate follows two different characters: an amnesiac named Rue, and a princess named Mint. Rue witnesses his friend and caretaker Claire being killed by an armoured man and seeks to revive her. Mint, the selfish princess of the East Heaven Kingdom, is removed from power and banished by her sister Maya, vowing to reclaim her throne and conquer the world. Rue and Mint end up in a parallel quest for the "Relic", an artifact left by the magically gifted Aeon people said to grant any wish. The two often cross paths, initially at odds but ending up helping each other as they explore ruins related to the Aeon people. They are both confronted by the Doll Master, the man who killed Claire and supported Mint's banishment, as he also seeks the relic. It is revealed that both the Doll Master and Rue are "Dolls", artificial beings created to serve the Aeon Valen and ensure his resurrection, as he preserved his spirit within the sought-after relic, dubbed the Dewprism.

Depending on the protagonist, the story varies, though both end up in Valen's fortress, which is activated by Doll Master. On Rue's path he overpowers Doll Master and confronts Valen. Valen first attempts to use a restored Claire as his vessel, then tries to possess Rue but is blocked by Claire's spirit. The rebellious Doll Master attacks Valen and is killed, and Rue kills Valen, reviving Claire in the process. In her route, Mint is recruited by Maya after Doll Master overtakes the East Heaven Kingdom, and the sisters mend their differences as they defeat Doll Master. The two then defeat Valen after he successfully possesses Rue. In both routes, the Dewprism is destroyed after Valen merges with it in a final attempt to avoid death. Upon completing both campaigns, Rue adopts another one of Valen's Dolls, and Mint persuades Rue to join her search for an Aeon artifact.

== Development ==
Threads of Fate, known in Japan as Dewprism, was created by Koji Sugimoto. Sugimoto had worked as a programmer at Final Fantasy developer Square on multiple notable titles, including Chrono Trigger and Xenogears. Sugimoto acted as director, and lead co-programmer with Masaki Kobayashi. The producer was Hiromichi Tanaka. Makoto Shimamoto created the world design and setting alongside drafting character scenarios. The script was written by Daisuke Watanabe, who was a newcomer to Square with a background of writing game novelizations. Yaeko Sato handled cutscene direction. The battle system was co-designed by Haruyuki Nishida and Takeo Fujii.

Following his work on Xenogears, which focused on mature themes and characters, Sugimoto wanted to create something accessible for younger players with humor and a simple story set in a world of bright designs and aesthetics. He also wanted to create an action game that could be played by those of low skill level. Additionally, he wanted to use his experience with the PlayStation hardware to create a fully 3D game. Sugimoto produced a prototype and presented it to Square, which was encouraging smaller projects at the time. Once approved, Sugimoto gathered a small team of twenty former Xenogears developers. Development began in March 1998 and lasted one and a half years. Despite the PlayStation 2 being close to release, Square had opted to continue developing for the PlayStation due to its large audience.

Rue's transformation mechanic, suggested and implemented by the battle designers, increased the team's workload as they needed to program all the monster forms he could use. To counterbalance Rue's transformation skills, Sugimoto made Mint a magic user with a unique fighting style. To avoid repetition, the team created "gimmicks" and alternate routes while preserving their goal of creating compelling gameplay in a 3D space. The development was described by Sugimoto as having "many twists and turns", with the team avoiding many problems thanks to their extensive experience in 3D graphics. Many team members worked overtime to complete the game, with incidents including staff sleeping in the office and motion designer Yuichi Kikuchi having nightmares about the characters.

Watanabe was brought on half a year into development, writing the script based on Shimamoto's world design and taking over full creative duties "little by little" during development. Originally Mint was going to be the sole protagonist as Sugimoto wanted to target a female audience, but then decided to broaden its potential demographic with two characters that would share graphical assets in their campaigns. The cast was kept small to place greater focus on the characters. Originally having only one scenario, Watanabe expanded the scenario into two parallel narratives with different endings, doubling his initial workload. Rue's rivalry with Doll Master was in place before Watanabe joined, but Mint had very little planned aside from hunting treasure. Under Watanabe, Mint took on her current world-conquering ambitions, and Maya was added as a middle ground between the two protagonists. He also wrote alternate interactions depending on the current protagonist, reflecting how people might behave differently when talking to others. Sugimoto created several of the jokes, and later commented that Sato's camera work added to the atmosphere.

Rue, Mint and Maya were designed by Tsutomu Terada, who also worked on promotional artwork. Tadahiro Usuda designed the supporting cast, while Hiroyuki Nagamine was monster designer. Sugimoto had liked Terada and Usuda's artwork for Xenogears. The art design of the game's world was described by map texture designer Koji Ichimura as "neither realistic nor anime". Terada was involved at an early stage, with his designs persisting as the characters' personalities and roles changed. Usuda felt that the in-game models for his designs looked better than his sketch versions. In keeping with the overall tone, Nagamine's monster designs were mostly designed not to be scary, and characters were given were flamboyant and energetic animations. Sugimoto created calculations where a character's eye sprites could focus on different preset lines of sight to add realism to cutscenes. Additional movements were hand-animated, such as the flowing cloth in a character's outfit.

=== Music ===
The music was composed, arranged and produced by Junya Nakano, whose previous work at Square included Another Mind. He began working on the soundtrack in September 1998, composing between forty and fifty songs and getting them into the game starting in March 1999. He created the score using a Roland SC-88Pro, as he had done with Another Mind, and drew inspiration from multiple other game projects and music albums when creating the score. The music was composed to match both the lighter tone of the game's story, and the 3D design. The first track Nakano composed was "The Mystery of East Heaven Kingdom", intended as a conversational piece. His final track, created as a late request by the staff, was the second boss theme. The game's main theme, which plays during the opening demo movie, was composed quickly as Sugimoto felt the intended track did not fit with its presentation. That track was repurposed into Mint's end credits theme. Due to space limitations, some completed tracks were removed from the game. The soundtrack remained one of Nakano's personal favorites out of his work. The sound design was overseen by Hidenori Iwasaki. To match the aesthetic and narrative tone, Iwasaki made most of the sounds non-threatening and cartoonish, making an exception for the Doll Master. Much of the instrumental elements were taken from sound sample collections.

A two-disc soundtrack album was published on November 20, 1999, by DigiCube. The album was reissued by Square Enix on July 17, 2006. Nakano attributed the reissue to fan demand over the seven years since the original album's release. The theme "Battle" was included in the compilation album Square Enix Battle Tracks Vol.3 Square 1999〜2000.

== Release ==
The game was announced under its Japanese title Dewprism in May 1999. It was released in Japan on October 14, 1999. A strategy guide was published that same month by DigiCube. Watanabe wrote a short story for inclusion in the guide. DigiCube also released themed merchandise in the form of a printed T-shirt, a plush toy based on one of the game's enemies, and a telecassette cover illustrated by Terada. The game was later re-released in Japan under the "Ultimate Hits" label on January 27, 2007, by Square Enix.

A North American release was confirmed in July 1999 alongside Chrono Cross and Legend of Mana. The game was published in North America on July 18, 2000, by Square Electronic Arts, a Western publishing house co-managed with Electronic Arts. For its Western release, the title was changed from Dewprism to Threads of Fate. The localization was led by Ryosuke Taketomi and Maki Yamane. An interactive game demo was packaged with early copies of Vagrant Story, featuring the beginning of the game up to the first boss. Threads of Fate formed part of a campaign run by Square Electronic Arts dubbed "Summer of Adventure 2000", releasing PlayStation titles each month between May and September with special bonuses.

== Reception ==
Reception

Aggregate score
Aggregator	Score
GameRankings	76%

Review scores
Publication	Score
Electronic Gaming Monthly	6.17/10
Famitsu	34/40
GamePro	3.5/5
GameSpot	7.9/10
IGN	7.7/10
Next Generation	4/5
Official U.S. PlayStation Magazine	3.5/5
RPGamer	6/10
RPGFan	77%

Threads of Fate sold over 111,000 units in Japan by the end of 1999. Sugimoto noted that the game did not sell well, attributing this to competition from other major titles by both Square and other companies.

The gameplay met with general praise. Japanese gaming magazine Famitsu spoke positively of the gameplay's simplicity, and Chris Baker of Official U.S. PlayStation Magazine cited it as one of the best action RPGs of the time after Brave Fencer Musashi. GamePro found the combat enjoyable and simple, but criticized the targeting system and the "boring" level design. The reviewers for Electronic Gaming Monthly all criticised a lack of gameplay depth. GameSpot's Andrew Vestal praised the gameplay and variety between the two characters, but felt the game was too short. David Smith, writing for IGN, cited the gameplay as simple yet enjoyable and the platforming elements as more challenging than frustrating. Samuel Bass of Next Generation praised the gameplay and controls, though noted its fast pace might be off-putting to fans of Square's slower-paced RPG titles. RPGFan writer Stahn Mahn enjoyed the gameplay despite its simple design. Andrew Long of RPGamer felt the game was repetitive in its combat and character progression, including Rue's monster designs. Critics had mixed opinions on the game's difficulty, and several reviewers found issues with the in-game camera and controls.

Journalists generally liked the 3D graphics. Famitsu praised the art design's quality, while Bass lauded the real-time cutscenes. The graphics were one of the few parts of the game which Electronic Gaming Monthly awarded praise. Baker disliked the lack of unique environments between the two campaigns, while Vestel positively described the graphics as "simple yet striking". Smith noted the quality of character models compared to environments. Mahn praised the 3D and aesthetic design, additionally lauding the character animation as some of the best on the platform. Long positively noted the graphical style, while GamePro felt the environments were less polished than the character models.

The music and sound design saw mixed reactions. Smith cited the music as good though not on the same level as other Square titles, while Mahn was mixed on both the music and sound design. Long praised the music as the game's standout element due to its unconventional style. GamePro found the sound design poor and the music mostly underwhelming.

The story also saw positive responses. Baker noted that the story, while "a bit juvenile" in places, was complex and featured an excellent localization. GamePro noted that Rue's story was engaging from the start, while Mint's had a more unique story as her character develops. Vestel described the characters as the game's main strength, highlighting the localization as one of Square's better efforts. Smith enjoyed the light-hearted storytelling and characters, and again praised the localization. Bass praised the narrative's transformation from a simple opening to an epic ending. Mahn described the two scenarios as "one of the highlights" of Threads of Fate. Long faulted the localization for punctuation and spelling mistakes, but described the story as fun, if also simple. However, Electronic Gaming Monthly felt that the story lacked interesting characters, and took too long to become interesting.

== Legacy ==
The director Sugimoto has stated that the game became a favourite both with Square fans, and staff within the company including Yoshinori Kitase and Yasumi Matsuno. Sugimoto teased his ideas for a sequel in the game's ending, but became busy with mastering development on the PlayStation 2. Square rejected a sequel pitch in 2004, and the game market shifted away from home consoles by the mid-2010s. Sugimoto has expressed interest in returning for a sequel in 2015. Watanabe highlighted Threads of Fate as giving him confidence writing female characters, informing his work on Yuna and Lightning from the Final Fantasy series. Nakano attributed Threads of Fate with maturing his musical style, shaping the style he used in Final Fantasy X.

Threads of Fate was re-released in Japan through PlayStation Network on June 23, 2010. A North American PSN release followed on April 18, 2011. Character outfits from Threads of Fate were featured in a 2016 collaboration with Square Enix's mobile game, Rampage Land Rankers.
