= Junya Nakano =

Japanese video game composer

- Born: February 28, 1971 (age 55); Kyoto, Japan
- Genres: Ambient, video game music
- Occupations: Composer, arranger
- Instruments: Piano, electronic organ
- Years active: 1992–present

Junya Nakano (仲野 順也, Nakano Jun'ya; born February 28, 1971) is a Japanese video game composer. After working for Konami in the early 1990s, he was employed by Squaresoft and then Square Enix from 1995 to 2009. He is best known for scoring Threads of Fate and co-composing Final Fantasy X for Squaresoft, arranging for Dawn of Mana and the Nintendo DS version of Final Fantasy IV for Square Enix, and scoring arcade video games such as X-Men and Mystic Warriors for Konami. Nakano has collaborated with Masashi Hamauzu on a number of games.

He was introduced to music at the age of three when his parents offered him lessons in the electronic organ. After studying composition and arrangement at a vocational school, Nakano worked for Konami from 1991 to 1994, where he scored numerous arcade games. Nakano is noted for his ambient style and for using percussion, timbre, and rhythm in his compositions.

== Biography ==
Junya Nakano was born in Kyoto, Japan. His parents introduced him to music when he was three years old, offering him lessons in the electronic organ through the Yamaha Music Foundation; they also encouraged him to join some brass bands. After playing the 1979 arcade game Lunar Rescue, he developed an interest in video games and subsequently began to enjoy chiptune music. By frequently listening to the radio, he started composing MIDI music using the NEC PC-9801 in 1985. In 1987, he attended a vocational school to study composition and arrangement in hopes of entering the gaming industry. After graduation, he joined the Kobe branch of Konami in 1991, where he contributed music to eight arcade games with several collaborators over a three-year period, including titles such as X-Men and Mystic Warriors. Deciding he wanted to create more original music and have a chance to receive individual recognition, Nakano left Konami after completing the score for Golfing Greats 2 in 1994.

Nakano joined Square (now Square Enix) in 1995. He created four pieces for the 1996 video game Front Mission: Gun Hazard, which featured composers Nobuo Uematsu, Yasunori Mitsuda, and Masashi Hamauzu. His first solo project came about with Satellaview's Treasure Conflix the same year. In 1996, Nakano joined several of Square's composers to create the soundtrack for the fighting game Tobal No. 1; he contributed three compositions. Hamauzu and Nakano became friends after working on Front Mission: Gun Hazard and Tobal No. 1, and they have later collaborated on several titles. In 1997, Nakano served as synthesizer programmer for the score to Front Mission: Alternative. Nakano composed the soundtrack for the Japan-only adventure game Another Mind, which he was given a deadline of two months to complete. His subsequent score to the 1999 title Threads of Fate (known as "Dewprism" in Japan) gave him worldwide recognition.

Since scoring Threads of Fate, Nakano has collaborated with several composers on major projects instead of being the sole composer. In 2001, Nakano and Hamauzu were chosen to assist Uematsu in the production of the score for the critically acclaimed Final Fantasy X, based on their ability to create music that was different from Uematsu's style; Nakano created 20 pieces. One of his tracks from the game, "Guadosalam", was arranged for the piano and featured in the album Piano Collections Final Fantasy X (2002). Following Final Fantasy X, Nakano composed the soundtrack to Asmik Ace Entertainment's flight simulator Sidewinder F.

Back at Square Enix, he created the music for Musashi: Samurai Legend with Hamauzu and the duo Wavelink Zeal (Takayuki and Yuki Iwai) in 2004. In 2006, Nakano created seven tracks for the Xbox 360 game Project Sylpheed, which also featured several other composers. Later the same year, he arranged four pieces from the Mana series for Dawn of Mana (known as "Seiken Densetsu 4" in Japan). He was also selected to arrange half of Final Fantasy IV's Nintendo DS remake under the supervision of Uematsu, and composed the soundtrack to its 2008 sequel, Final Fantasy IV: The After Years. On December 31, 2009, Nakano confirmed that he had left Square Enix and would be joining his former mentor and collaborator Yuji Takenouchi's supergroup "GeOnDan", whom have since disbanded. Nakano's last projects for Square Enix before leaving were the soundtracks to Fullmetal Alchemist: Prince of the Dawn and Daughter of the Dusk.

== Musical style and influences ==
Nakano is best known for creating ambient music with percussive, timbral, and rhythmic elements. According to an interview conducted by the website RocketBaby.net, Nakano was composing music focusing on an instrument's tone and acoustics until 1995, while after that time, he slowly moved his focus toward studying the harmony and melody important to music as a whole. After joining Square, he started focusing on rhythm and timbre which he implemented in titles like Front Mission: Gun Hazard, Treasure Conflix, and Tobal No. 1. The music in Threads of Fate contains many different styles like ambient, jazz, and Spanish music; the tracks have been described as "mellow" and "upbeat". For Final Fantasy X, Nakano was responsible for most of the ambient-styled compositions, which featured percussion, timbre, and rhythm. Nakano stated in the original soundtrack's liner notes that he wanted to create music with a "vibrant and dynamic feel" that tied together his years of experience with game music.

When starting out in the field of music, he was influenced by brass bands he was involved with and electronic organ music; however, he could not think of a specific musician who influenced him. Nakano cites Hamauzu as the colleague he admires most at Square Enix, and is particularly interested in the sounds he creates. When asked about his thoughts of Uematsu and how he had influenced his work, Nakano replied: "He is a very youthful and active person, but he hasn't influenced my work."

== Works ==
Year	Title	Notes	Ref.
1992	Asterix	Music with various others	
1992	X-Men	Music with Seiichi Fukami, Yuji Takenouchi, and Ayako Nishigaki	
1992	Hexion	Music with Yuji Takenouchi, Satoko Miyawaki, and Ayako Nishigaki	
1993	Martial Champion	Music with Keiji Sugisawa	
1993	Mystic Warriors	Music with Yuji Takenouchi and Inoue	
1994	Polygonet Commanders	Music with Yuji Takenouchi	
1994	Golfing Greats 2	Music with Yuji Takenouchi	
1995	Five A Side Soccer	Music	
1996	Front Mission: Gun Hazard	Music with Nobuo Uematsu, Yasunori Mitsuda, and Masashi Hamauzu	
1996	Treasure Conflix	Music	
1996	Tobal No. 1	Music with various others	
1997	Front Mission Alternative	Synthesizer programming	
1998	Another Mind	Music	
1999	Threads of Fate	Music	
2001	Final Fantasy X	Music with Nobuo Uematsu and Masashi Hamauzu	
2001	Lethal Skies Team SW: Elite Pilot	Music	
2004	Fullmetal Alchemist: Dream Carnival	Music with various others	
2005	Musashi: Samurai Legend	Music with Masashi Hamauzu, Takayuki Iwai, and Yuki Iwai	
2006	Project Sylpheed	Music with various others	
2006	Dawn of Mana	Arrangements with Hirosato Noda	
2007	Final Fantasy IV (Nintendo DS)	Arrangements with Kenichiro Fukui	
2008	Final Fantasy IV: The After Years	Music	
2009	Fullmetal Alchemist: Prince of the Dawn	Music	
2009	Fullmetal Alchemist: Daughter of the Dusk	Music	
2009	Final Fantasy XIII	Arrangements with various others	
2013	Final Fantasy X/X-2 HD Remaster	Arrangements with various others	
2015	Galaxy Gladiator Genesis	Music with various others	
2018	Final Fantasy Record Keeper	DLC; music with various others	
2023	Final Fantasy VII: Ever Crisis	Music with various others	
2025	Hotel Barcelona	Music with various others	
2025	Bounty Sisters	Music with Yuji Takenouchi, Miki Higashino, and Takako Yumishima	
2026	Tanuki: Pon's Summer	"Fur in the Wind"	
