= Final Fantasy X/X-2 HD Remaster =

Remastered video game

- Developers: Square Enix 1st Production Department; Virtuos
- Publisher: Square Enix
- Producer: Yoshinori Kitase
- Programmers: Hiroshi Harata; Yasunari Ohnishi; Takashi Katano
- Artists: Shintaro Takai; He Zong Hua; Andrea Cordella
- Writer: Kazushige Nojima
- Composers: Masashi Hamauzu; Junya Nakano
- Series: Final Fantasy
- Engine: PhyreEngine
- Platforms: PlayStation 3; PlayStation Vita; PlayStation 4; Windows; Nintendo Switch; Xbox One; Nintendo Switch 2
- Release: December 26, 2013: PlayStation 3, Vita; JP: December 26, 2013; NA: March 18, 2014; AU: March 20, 2014; EU: March 21, 2014 PlayStation 4; NA: May 12, 2015; JP: May 14, 2015; AU: May 14, 2015; EU: May 15, 2015 Windows; WW: May 12, 2016 Switch, Xbox One; JP: April 11, 2019; WW: April 16, 2019 Switch 2; WW: July 23, 2026
- Genre: Role-playing
- Mode: Single-player

Final Fantasy X/X-2 HD Remaster (Note: Japanese: ファイナルファンタジーX/X-2 HD リマスター, Hepburn: Fainaru Fantajī Ten/Ten Tsū HD Rimasutā) is a 2013 role-playing video game compilation developed and published by Square Enix. It is a high-definition remaster of Final Fantasy X (2001) and Final Fantasy X-2 (2003), originally developed by Square for the PlayStation 2 in the early 2000s. It also features story content previously only found in the International versions, and a new audio drama set a year after the events of X-2. The collection saw graphical and musical revisions and is based on the international versions of both games, making certain content accessible to players outside of Japan for the first time.

The Chinese studio Virtuos handled large parts of its development, while Square Enix assisted the process and published the collection. It was released for the PlayStation 3 and PlayStation Vita in Japan in December 2013 and worldwide in March 2014, for the PlayStation 4 in May 2015, for Windows in May 2016, for the Nintendo Switch and Xbox One in April 2019, and for the Nintendo Switch 2 in July 2026. The collection sold favorably, and received positive reviews. Many critics praised the graphical upgrade and the chance to play through the games on the new platforms. The collection did receive criticism for a few minor upgrade faults and uneven quality between the two, while some of the collection's added content drew mixed opinions. As of September 2021, the Final Fantasy X series had sold over 20.8 million units worldwide, and at the end of March 2022 had surpassed 21.1 million.

== Content ==
The HD remaster covers both Final Fantasy X and its sequel X-2. The first game follows the journey of the teenager Tidus who is transported to the world of Spira after an encounter with a creature known as Sin. He becomes one of the guardians of the summoner Yuna, protecting her on a pilgrimage to defeat Sin and finding out how the creature is linked to Tidus' and Yuna's late fathers. Gameplay relies on the Conditional Turn-Based Battle system that allows for swapping party members in mid-combat. Characters are leveled up by means of the Sphere Grid on which the player may choose a specific skill to learn or attribute to improve. The second game is set two years after the events of X and features Yuna as a treasure hunter in search of spheres leading her to Tidus. It reintroduces the series' classic job system in the form of the Garment Grid: jobs can be acquired as dresspheres, costumes that give the player characters different abilities, throughout the game and may be changed in battle. X-2 includes multiple minigames such as Sphere Break and blitzball, the latter of which also featured prominently in X.

While the majority of the gameplay for X and X-2 remains unchanged, the games have undergone an extensive graphical update and a large amount of the music for X has been rearranged. All regional releases contain content from the International versions: X has the expert Sphere Grid and several optional bosses, while X-2 comes with extra dresspheres and new minigames. The Creature Creator system was added, whereby players can capture enemy monsters and certain non-player characters (NPCs) to train them and to have them fight alongside the party in battle, similar to the Pokémon series: these captured allies can also be fought and strengthened in a coliseum. Lastly, X-2 includes the "Last Mission" extra dungeon that plays in the style of a roguelike 3D game, having a grid-based layout across which the characters move and take on enemies. Layouts are generated randomly and each opponent is allowed as many turns as the player has taken. As in the main game, the player characters can equip jobs in the form of dresspheres. The Eternal Calm movie that bridges the gap between X and X-2 is included in the collection as well. The collection allows for cross-platform saving between the PlayStation 3 (PS3), PlayStation Vita and PlayStation 4 versions and both games have their own trophy lists which are shared across the three platforms.

Final Fantasy X: Will is an original audio drama included in the release, playing during the credits. It features multiple characters from the games, alongside two new characters: the narrator Chuami and her companion Kurgum. In the story, the two are sent to summon Yuna to investigate a mysterious phenomenon known as "Beckoning", where the dead are being called back into existence. On their journey, they encounter a beckoned version of Sin. Over the course of the story, it is revealed that Tidus is suffering from some kind of weakness, and that Yuna and he appear to have broken up and Yuna is seeing someone else. The drama ends with Yuna preparing to face Sin again and Tidus, despite his weakness, deciding to follow her; Chuami and Kurgum decide to accompany them.

== Development ==
Comparison between the graphics from the original Final Fantasy X (left) and the remaster (right).

The idea for a remaster originated from a reunion of the games' original development team and voice cast during the making of Final Fantasy Type-0. Character designer Tetsuya Nomura, associate producer Hideki Imaizumi and a voice actor thought that they should create something to celebrate the tenth anniversary of X. Producer Yoshinori Kitase's personal motivation was to have people too young to have played the games experience them, as his son was only old enough to know the characters of Tidus and Yuna from Dissidia Final Fantasy and its prequel. Another reason was that many did not have an opportunity to play the games since they were not compatible with the majority of PlayStation 3 models and neither available on the PlayStation Network unlike games from the original PlayStation like Final Fantasy VII and IX. Nomura entered negotiations with other old members of staff and got a remaster of X and X-2 approved, but the actual development process was delayed because much of the team was still busy with the creation of Final Fantasy XIII. The remaster was first announced at Tokyo Game Show 2011, where it was assumed that the game would release to commemorate X's tenth anniversary.

The bulk of the remastering work was outsourced to the Shanghai-based studio Virtuos. Square Enix's internal staff was responsible for reassembling the original assets, and helped with a part of redoing the high-definition data. Among the returning original team members were Motomu Toriyama, Yusuke Naora, Toshitaka Matsuda and Masaki Kobayashi who supervised the production. X-2 art director Shintaro Takai remained in the same role for both remastered games. The Chinese side of development was headed by managing director Pan Feng. The team encountered problems in porting the games to PlayStation 3 and Vita as their graphics used many functionalities unique to the PlayStation 2 hardware. The loss and repair of some of the original assets posed another hurdle, with Kitase commenting that it might have been easier to recreate the data from the ground up.

The PlayStation 3 version supports display resolutions of 720p and 1080p – the former with and the latter without anti-aliasing – while the Vita version runs at 720x408 pixels. Graphical features such as the water effects and lighting were improved. Other changes include the addition of bloom, the move from circular to dynamic shadows and tweaks to environmental geometry and texturing. The developers revised the 3D models for both games: most models merely received new textures but those of the playable characters were rebuilt completely with noticeable changes to their faces. The cutscenes and prerendered environments needed to be adjusted from a 4:3 to a 16:9 screen ratio, the process of which required lots of art and programming readjustments. For example, the widescreen display led to character models being visible in a cutscene although they were to appear only in a later shot; these instances had to be corrected. Both the prerendered background images and cutscenes were cropped at the top and bottom to fit the new screen ratio. However, they received a bump in resolution to appear much clearer than in the PlayStation 2 version. The gameplay also needed to be duplicated while bringing it up to the standard of a high definition game, which was harder than the team thought.

Sixty tracks of the original Final Fantasy X soundtrack by Nobuo Uematsu, Masashi Hamauzu and Junya Nakano were rearranged. Hamauzu and Nakano took charge of most of the revised music, with Tsutomu Narita and Ryo Yamazaki also making select arrangements. The soundtrack for X-2 by Noriko Matsueda and Takahito Eguchi was carried over from the original PlayStation 2 version. For the credits of the HD remaster, scenario writer Kazushige Nojima wrote the audio drama Final Fantasy X: Will as an appendix taking place two years after X-2. Nojima and Nomura felt that it was a good opportunity to expand upon the universe of X. They opted for the audio drama format as the team did not want to create a solid visual impression, instead intending to leave it up to interpretation. The team wanted the audio drama to be the "direct opposite" to the upbeat feel and happy ending of X-2. This wish for a more melancholy atmosphere resulted in them bringing Sin, the main antagonist of X, back into the story, as the team wanted to keep it involved in a similar fashion to Sephiroth, the main antagonist of Final Fantasy VII and its companion media. The drama's open ending was also intentional, as Kitase "wanted to leave something up to the player's imagination".

== Release ==
Final Fantasy X/X-2 HD Remaster was released as a collection for the PlayStation 3 and as separate releases of each game for the PlayStation Vita. Alongside the standard PlayStation Vita releases in Japan, there was a Twin Pack that bundled both games and a Resolution Box collection which additionally contained the handheld console. A dual release was decided against for the Vita versions due to the limited storage capacity of the cartridges. Play Arts Kai figurines of Tidus and Yuna were produced and the original soundtracks were re-released. Two new Ultimania guide books were published for each game. Nojima wrote the tie-in novel Final Fantasy X-2.5: Eien no Daishō that bridges the gap between Last Mission and Final Fantasy X: Will. A Collector's Edition of the PlayStation 3 version was exclusively released in North America via Square Enix's online store. It contained both games, an artwork book, a Blu-ray disc for the rearranged soundtrack and five artwork lithographs. A special launch event was held at Gallery Nucleus in Alhambra, California during March 2014. It included a signing event with Kitase and Naora, and an artwork auction with all profits going to the victims of Typhoon Haiyan. The PlayStation 4 port of the remaster, which supports save transfers from the PS3 and Vita versions and remote play on the Vita, was released worldwide in May 2015.

The X/X-2 HD Remaster was later released on Windows via Steam on May 12, 2016 with 4K support, 5 game boosters, 3 parameter changes, audio volume options, the option to skip FMVs and an auto-save feature. Versions for the Nintendo Switch and Xbox One were released on April 16, 2019, with the audio volume options as well as 4K support on Xbox. The Switch version also restored the Quick Recovery feature previously exclusive to the Vita versions of the games, with use of the console's touch screen in Handheld Mode. A Nintendo Switch 2 version of the HD Remaster is scheduled to be released on July 23, 2026, featuring higher resolution presentation and the addition of the booster toggles previously exclusive to the Windows port.

== Reception ==
Reception

Aggregate scores
Aggregator	Score
Metacritic	PS3: 85/100; VITA: 86/100; PS4: 84/100; PC: 83/100; NS: 85/100; XONE: 85/100
OpenCritic	89% recommend (Note: Based on 90 reviews)

Review scores
Publication	Score
Destructoid	PS3: 8/10
Eurogamer	9/10
Game Informer	9/10
GamesMaster	92%
GameSpot	8/10
GamesRadar+	4/5
GamesTM	9/10
Hardcore Gamer	4.5/5
IGN	9.3/10
PlayStation Official Magazine – Australia	9/10
PlayStation Official Magazine – UK	9/10
PC Gamer (US)	85/100
RPGFan	90%
VideoGamer.com	PS3: 8/10
Digital Spy	4/5
Financial Post	9/10
NowGamer	VITA: 8.5/10

The remaster has received favorable reviews. On Metacritic, the Vita version holds a score of 86/100, the PS3 version an 85/100, the PS4 version an 84/100, and the PC version an 83/100.

Reaction to the quality of the remaster was mostly positive. IGN's Meghan Sullivan said that despite the game showing its roots, it "looks and sounds dramatically better", though critiqued some textures, off-putting facial close-ups and lip-synching problems carried over from the original. GameSpot's Josiah Renaudin was generally positive, calling the visual upgrades "compelling reasons to revisit one of the most poignant entries in the long-running series", although he found the uneven graphical upgrade comparisons between player characters and NPCs jarring. Reviewing the PlayStation 3 version, Destructoid's Dale North generally praised the upgrade, but also said that the fixed camera had not aged well and some of the smaller, more detailed aspects of environments and models had not received a thorough HD treatment. Game Informer's Kimberley Wallace generally praised the upgrade, but noted that character movements betrayed the game's age. GamesRadar's Ashley Reed called the environments better-looking, but found the characters "oddly doll-like" and noted graphical limitations carried over from the original. She found less of these problems in X-2. Digital Spy's Mark Langshaw praised the upgrade, but noted framerate dips and "ropey" animations. He also noted that the character models in X-2 were updated better than those in X. Reviewing the PS3 version, VideoGamer.com's Daniel Cairns was highly positive, despite noting some lingering awkward moments. In his review of the Vita version, Ryan King of NowGamer generally praised the updates and polishing the game received. While the Vita version was similarly praised by the majority of reviewers, Renaudin and Wallace noted that some dated textures stood out more.

The remastered soundtrack received mixed reviews. North noted that the revamped music "might be less agreeable to fans of the original score", while praising the general improvement in the sound. Wallace found the soundtrack a mixed bag, with some tracks being improved by the remastering and others feeling uneven or losing their impact. Renaudin said that, while the soundtrack was crisper, fans of the original "might not immediately notice the acoustic alterations". Eternal Calm, Last Mission and Will received mixed responses. Caires called Last Mission "a good little distraction", but called Will "incomprehensible". Sullivan didn't enjoy Eternal Calm or Last Mission, while finding Will "incredibly weird and confusing", recommending players to stay clear of it. Wallace called Last Mission "a nice diversion, but not incredibly engaging", while North noted that it "may not have as much appeal to fans of your typical Final Fantasy game".

Opinions for the original gameplay and story remained generally unchanged from the original games: the stories for X and X-2 received positive and mixed reviews respectively, while the gameplay was generally praised. The new gameplay features for X and X-2 received mixed reviews. Sullivan called the extra content "[her] favorite thing about this remastered version", while Langshaw called the extra features, including Last Mission, "welcome inclusions".

=== Sales ===
During its first week on sale in Japan, the PlayStation 3 and Vita versions of the game sold 185,918 and 149,132 copies respectively. The total sales for PS3 and Vita versions in its first week was over 339,000 copies in Japan. The individual PlayStation Vita versions of X and X-2 sold 31,775 and 16,355 copies respectively during their first two weeks in Japan. The two versions of HD Remaster were also successful in North America, selling 206,000 copies within a month of its release. The game was the 7th best-selling game for PS3 and the top-selling title for Vita on the PlayStation Network for the month of February 2014. The title's overall sales were cited by Square Enix as a reason for its improved financial situation at the end of the 2013/14 fiscal year. As of April 2018, the PC version of the game has sold over 584,000 copies on Steam.

== Legacy ==
The audio drama sparked speculation of a second sequel to X. In a February 2014 interview, Shinji Hashimoto said that the audio drama was simply meant to expand on the universe and did not mean a sequel was in development. Prior to this, Nojima stated that if there was enough demand, there could be developments, and that he would like to write the story for a second sequel. Nojima later revealed to Famitsu: "For the record, there's a plot from start to finish, and if there's some way we can have it show up elsewhere… well, so I've said to Square Enix". Later, speaking with Famitsu in a feature concerning industry rumors, Kitase denied that a second sequel was in development, and that both Eien no Daishō and the audio drama were simply intended as standalone continuations of the games' universe. Shinji Hashimoto revealed in October 2016 that Final Fantasy X-3 is possible but Square Enix is currently busy with other projects and he also confirmed that the audio drama is the basis for it.

Dissidia Final Fantasy NT director Takeo Kujiraoka revealed that the staff had received multiple requests by fans to include Tidus' and Yuna's Will look as an alternative design but Nomura said it was not possible as the company would first need to develop Final Fantasy X-3.

In July 2021, Nomura revealed that the story for the potential sequel has been written by Nojima. Toriyama similarly expressed interest in returning to the world of Spira and said that it could potentially happen after finishing Final Fantasy VII Remake.

As part of celebrations for Final Fantasy X's 25th anniversary, Square Enix released Nojima's Final Fantasy X-2.5 novella digitally for the first time.

Also in 2026, Nomura again expressed interest in working with the characters again to see how they are doing after all this time.
