= Masashi Hamauzu =

Japanese composer and pianist (born 1971)

- 浜渦 正志
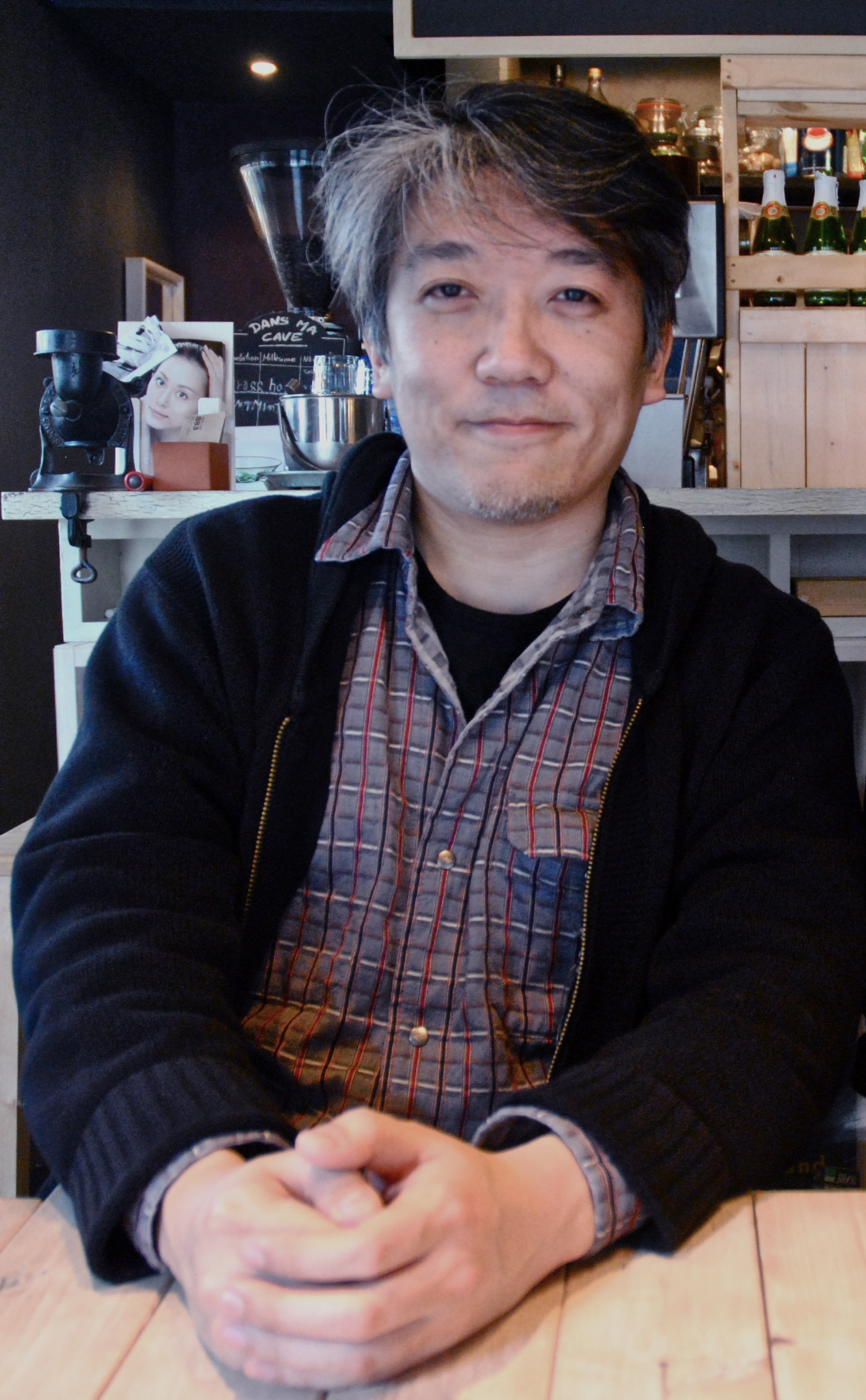
- Hamauzu in 2012
- Born: September 20, 1971 (age 55); Munich, West Germany
- Education: Tokyo University of the Arts
- Occupations: Composer; pianist; lyricist
- Years active: 1996–present
- Employers: Square (1996–2003); Square Enix (2003–2010)
- Musical career
- Genres: Electronic; classical; ambient; video game music
- Instrument: Piano
- Website: Official Website

Masashi Hamauzu (浜渦 正志, Hamauzu Masashi; born September 20, 1971) is a Japanese composer, pianist, and lyricist. Hamauzu, who was employed at Square Enix from 1996 to 2010, was best known during that time for his work on the Final Fantasy and SaGa video game series. Born into a musical family in Germany, Hamauzu was raised in Japan. He became interested in music while in kindergarten, and took piano lessons from his parents.

Hamauzu was hired by Square as a trainee, and his debut as a solo composer came the following year when he scored Chocobo's Mysterious Dungeon. He has collaborated with friend and fellow composer Junya Nakano on several games.

After Nobuo Uematsu left Square Enix in 2004, Hamauzu took over as the leading composer of the company's music team. He was the sole composer for Final Fantasy XIII. He has also become a renowned pianist, arranging for several other composers. His music incorporates various styles, although he often uses classical and ambience in his pieces. In 2010, Hamauzu left Square Enix to start his own studio, MONOMUSIK.

== Biography ==
=== Early life ===
Born in Munich, Germany, on September 20, 1971, Hamauzu's mother was a piano teacher and his father, Akimori Hamauzu, an opera singer. He developed an interest in music while in kindergarten. Hamauzu grew up in Germany and started to receive piano and singing lessons from his parents at very young age, and when he was in high school, he composed his first original music piece. After his brother, Hiroshi, was born, the family moved to Osaka. He enrolled in the Tokyo University of the Arts, where he joined a student ensemble as a pianist. Hamauzu met his wife, Matsue Hamauzu (née Fukushi), at the university, and they have two children. Matsue worked alongside Hamauzu on the soundtrack to Final Fantasy VII as a soprano and Sigma Harmonics as a scat singer; she was also a soprano for the score to Final Fantasy VIII & a lead vocalist in Final Fantasy XIII. After graduating from the university, he thought about becoming a classical musician, but he eventually found out that he wanted to work with game music instead.

=== Career ===
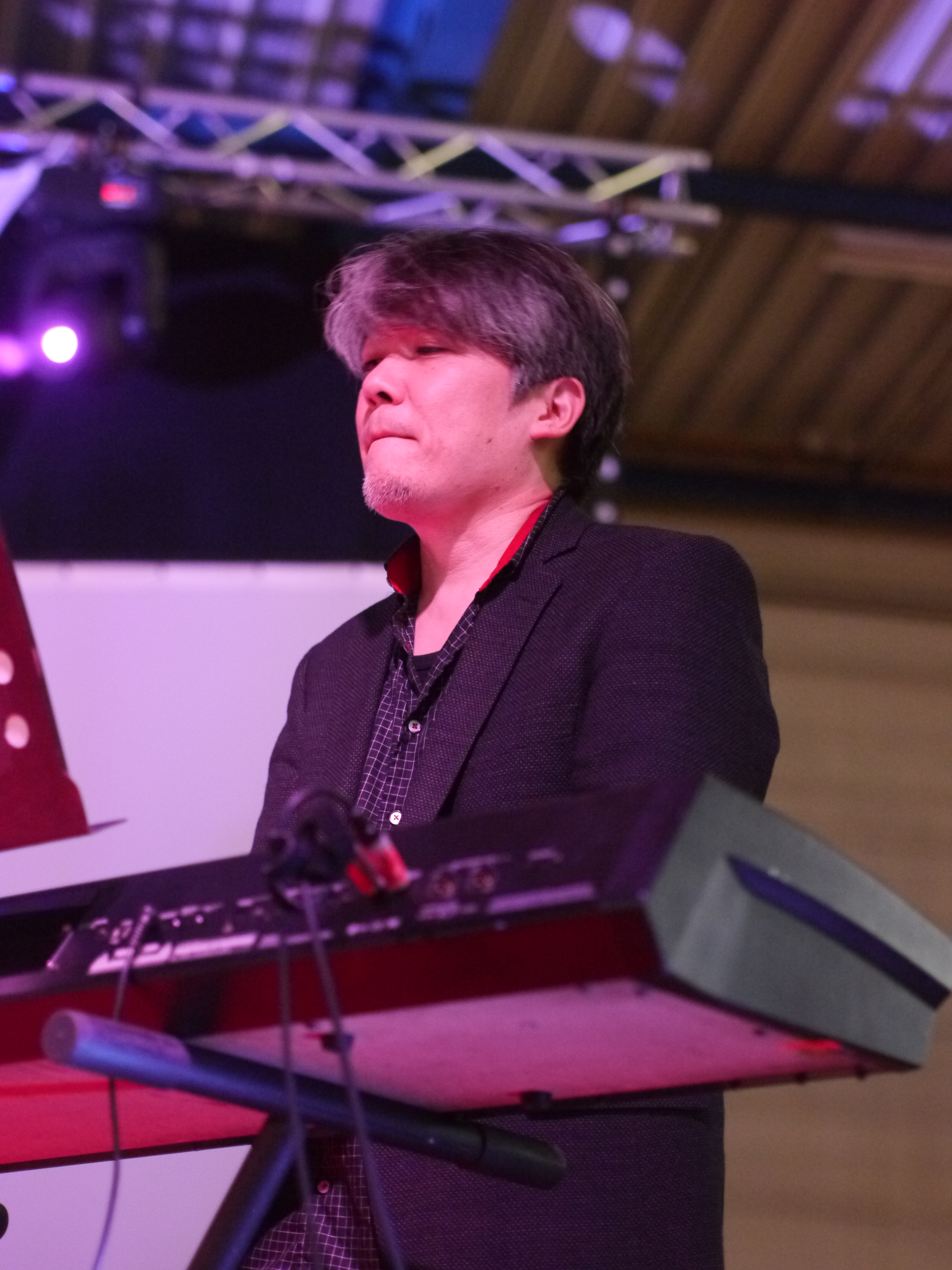
Hamauzu performing at an event in 2012

A fan of the Final Fantasy games, Hamauzu decided to apply for a job at Square, where Nobuo Uematsu hired him as a trainee in 1996. His debut project was Front Mission: Gun Hazard with Uematsu, Yasunori Mitsuda, and Junya Nakano. Later the same year, he created four tracks for another multi-composer game, Tobal No. 1. Working with Nakano on these games, Hamauzu admired his musical style, and they became friends; they have later collaborated on several titles. Hamauzu's first solo project came in 1997 with Chocobo's Mysterious Dungeon. Shortly after the title's release, Hamauzu and Yasuo Sako created Chocobo no Fushigina Dungeon Coi Vanni Gialli, an arranged album containing orchestral tracks from the game's music. Both the soundtrack and Coi Vanni Gialli were praised. For Final Fantasy VII, Hamauzu was the synthesizer programmer for the rendition of Joseph Haydn's "The Creation", and provided bass vocals in the eight-person chorus for "One-Winged Angel".

In 1999, Hamauzu was assigned with scoring SaGa Frontier 2. He spent some time conforming to the music Kenji Ito had established for the series before realizing that he wanted to use his own unique style. The project introduced him to synthesizer programmer Ryo Yamazaki, whom he has worked with on most of his subsequent soundtracks. Hamauzu also released Piano Pieces "SF2" ~ Rhapsody on a Theme of SaGa Frontier 2, an arranged album featuring piano pieces of the game's music. In 2001, Hamauzu and Nakano were chosen to assist Uematsu in the production of the score for the critically acclaimed Final Fantasy X, based on their ability to create music that was different from Uematsu's style. Hamauzu also contributed the Piano Collections arranged album of the game, which he described as his most challenging work, and the track named "feel", an arrangement of "Hymn of the Fayth", from the EP feel/Go dream: Yuna & Tidus.

In 2002, Hamauzu composed the music for Unlimited Saga, a game that would be received negatively by critics due to a variety of gameplay issues. After Uematsu's departure from Square Enix in 2004, he took over as the lead composer of the company's music team. He incorporates various styles of music in his compositions, though most of the tune he uses classical and ambient tones in his pieces. In 2005, Hamauzu, Nakano, and the duo Wavelink Zeal (Takayuki and Yuki Iwai) scored Musashi: Samurai Legend, the sequel to the 1998 title Brave Fencer Musashi. Hamauzu composed the highly anticipated but critically unsuccessful Final Fantasy VII follow-up, Dirge of Cerberus: Final Fantasy VII, in 2006. Later the same year, he arranged the Sailing to the World Piano Score at the request of Mitsuda. The album was well received by fans, and helped confirm Hamauzu's position as a leading piano arranger of video game music.

Hamauzu released a solo album, Vielen Dank, in 2007 after recording it in Munich, Germany. The album includes eleven piano pieces that he composed for personal pleasure after the creation of Piano Pieces "SF2" ~ Rhapsody on a Theme of SaGa Frontier 2 as well as 14 arrangements of his game compositions. Two tracks from the album were performed at the 2007 Symphonic Game Music Concert in Leipzig. In 2008, he composed the soundtrack to Sigma Harmonics, with synthesizer programming by Mitsuto Suzuki rather than Yamazaki. At the 2006 E3 event, a Square Enix press conference revealed that Hamauzu would be returning to the Final Fantasy series, scoring Final Fantasy XIII. He left Square Enix on January 19, 2010. He went on to form his own studio, Monomusik, which he described as a personal studio that did not include any other composers. Despite leaving Square Enix, Hamauzu was still hired to score various games by the company, including Final Fantasy XIII-2, Lightning Returns: Final Fantasy XIII, World of Final Fantasy, and the high definition version of Final Fantasy X. Outside of the Final Fantasy series, Hamauzu also wrote music for games such as Half-Minute Hero: The Second Coming, The Legend of Legacy, and The Alliance Alive in the 2010s. He contributed arrangements to the Across the Worlds ~ Chrono Cross Wayô Piano Collection album alongside Akio Noguchi and Mariam Abounnasr.

== Musical style and influences ==
Hamauzu composes music in a wide variety of styles, often using multiple styles throughout the various pieces of a soundtrack. He mostly creates classical and ambient music, and uses the piano predominantly as an instrument. He frequently uses dissonance to provide an atmospheric effect. In Unlimited Saga, for example, the style of his compositions mix classical marches, tango music, electronic ambiance, instrumental solos, bossa nova, and jazz.

He cites animation composers Hiroshi Miyagawa and Ryuichi Sakamoto of Yellow Magic Orchestra and his father as major musical influences. During his adolescence, he enjoyed listening to the works of Miyagawa and Sakamoto. While attending university, he developed an appreciation for classical music, especially the compositions of Ravel and Debussy.

== Works ==
=== Video games ===
Year	Title	Role(s)	Ref.
1996	Front Mission: Gun Hazard	Music with Nobuo Uematsu, Yasunori Mitsuda, and Junya Nakano	
1996	Tobal No. 1	Music with several others	
1997	Chocobo's Mysterious Dungeon	Music	
1999	SaGa Frontier 2	Music	
2001	Final Fantasy X	Music with Nobuo Uematsu and Junya Nakano	
2002	Unlimited Saga	Music	
2005	Musashi: Samurai Legend	Music with Junya Nakano, Takayuki Iwai, and Yuki Iwai	
2006	Dirge of Cerberus: Final Fantasy VII	Music	
2008	Oolong Tea Story	Music	
2008	Sigma Harmonics	Music	
2009	Final Fantasy XIII	Music	
2011	Music GunGun! 2	Music with several others	
2011	Final Fantasy IV: The Complete Collection	Arrangements with Junya Nakano and Kenichiro Fukui	
2011	Half-Minute Hero: The Second Coming	"Final Battle of Revolution"	
2011	Final Fantasy XIII-2	Music with Naoshi Mizuta and Mitsuto Suzuki	
2013	Lightning Returns: Final Fantasy XIII	Music with Naoshi Mizuta and Mitsuto Suzuki	
2013	Final Fantasy X/X-2 HD Remaster	Arrangements with Junya Nakano, Tsutomu Narita, and Ryo Yamazaki	
2014	Super Smash Bros. for Nintendo 3DS and Wii U	Arrangements (Note: "Green Greens Ver. 2", "Stage Select (Pikmin 2)")	
2014	Groove Coaster	"Shooting Star"	
2015	The Legend of Legacy	Music	
2015	Chunithm: Seelisch Tact	"The Ether"	
2016	World of Final Fantasy	Music with Shingo Kataoka and Hayata Takeda	
2017	The Alliance Alive	Music with Ayane Hamauzu	
2019	Final Fantasy XIV: Shadowbringers	"A Dream in Flight"	
2020	Final Fantasy VII Remake	Music with Mitsuto Suzuki	
2022	Sin Chronicle	"Anne"	
2023	Wild Hearts	Music with several others	
2024	Final Fantasy VII Rebirth	Music with Mitsuto Suzuki	
2024	Ember Storia	Music	

=== Anime ===
Year	Title	Role(s)	Ref.
2012	Good Luck Girl!	Music	
2014	Paulette's Chair	Music	
2015	Typhoon Noruda	Music	
2016	ClassicaLoid	Music	
2021	To Your Eternity	"Mediator"	
2022	To Your Eternity	"Roots"	
2025	To Your Eternity	"Recollections"	
2026	To Your Eternity	"Recollections Ver.2"	
