= Music of Final Fantasy X =

Music from the video game Final Fantasy X

The music of the video game Final Fantasy X was composed by regular series composer Nobuo Uematsu, along with Masashi Hamauzu and Junya Nakano. It was the first title in the main Final Fantasy series in which Uematsu was not the sole composer. The Final Fantasy X Original Soundtrack was released on four Compact Discs in 2001 by DigiCube, and was re-released in 2004 by Square Enix. Prior to the album's North American release, a reduced version entitled Final Fantasy X Official Soundtrack was released on a single disk by Tokyopop in 2002. An EP entitled feel/Go dream: Yuna & Tidus containing additional singles not present in the game was released by DigiCube in 2001. Piano Collections Final Fantasy X, a collection of piano arrangements of the original soundtracks by Masashi Hamauzu and performed by Aki Kuroda, was released by DigiCube in 2002 and re-released by Square EA in 2004. A collection of vocal arrangements of pieces from the game arranged by Katsumi Suyama along with radio drama tracks was released as Final Fantasy X Vocal Collection in 2002 by DigiCube.

The theme song for the game is titled "Suteki da ne", which was performed by Japanese folk singer Ritsuki Nakano, known as "RIKKI". The song was released as a single by DigiCube in 2001 and was re-released by Square Enix in 2004. The game's music was well received overall; reviewers praised the additions to the soundtrack by the two new composers for the series. They especially praised Hamauzu, both for his work in the original soundtrack and in arranging the themes for Piano Collections Final Fantasy X. Several tracks, especially "Suteki da ne" and "Zanarkand", remain popular today and have been performed numerous times in orchestral concert series, as well as published in arranged and compilation albums by Square and outside groups.

== Creation and influence ==
Final Fantasy X marks the first time Nobuo Uematsu has had any assistance in composing the score for a Final Fantasy game. His fellow composers for X were Masashi Hamauzu and Junya Nakano. Uematsu contributed 51 tracks, Hamauzu contributed 20 and Nakano contributed 18 tracks to the game. The two new composers were chosen for the soundtrack based on their ability to create music that was different than Uematsu's while still working together. Uematsu states that his music has been inspired by the music of popstar idols such as Elton John and Paul McCartney, and that his favorite part about the soundtrack is the good reviews from listeners. Nakano set out to create music with a "vibrant and dynamic feel" that tied together his years of experience with game music, while Hamauzu tried to use the soundtrack to bring video game music to "greater heights".

"Zanarkand nite"(lit. "At Zanarkand") was originally written by Uematsu before the development of Final Fantasy X, for the recital of a flutist friend named Seo. Uematsu eventually decided the track was too gloomy and kept it for a later use. When development of X started, he decided to use the track for the game.

== Albums ==
=== Final Fantasy X Original Soundtrack ===
Final Fantasy X Original Soundtrack

Studio album by Nobuo Uematsu, Masashi Hamauzu, Junya Nakano
- Released: August 1, 2001; May 10, 2004 (re-release)
- Length: Disc 1: 66:47; Disc 2: 64:05; Disc 3: 60:39; Disc 4: 74:50
- Label: DigiCube (Japan); Tokyopop (North America); Square Enix (re-release)
- Producer: Nobuo Uematsu

Final Fantasy X Original Soundtrack (ファイナルファンタジーＸ オリジナルサウンドトラック, Fainaru Fantajī Ten Orijinaru Saundotorakku) is a soundtrack album of music from Final Fantasy X composed, arranged and produced by Nobuo Uematsu, Masashi Hamauzu and Junya Nakano. Vocals are performed by RIKKI for "Suteki da ne", Bill Muir for "Otherworld", and choruses for "Hymn of the Fayth". It spans four discs and 91 tracks, covering a duration of 4:32:26. It was first released in Japan on August 1, 2001 by DigiCube with catalog number SSCX-10054, and was re-released on May 10, 2004 by Square Enix with catalog number SQEX-10013.

In 2002, Tokyopop released a version of Final Fantasy X Original Soundtrack in North America entitled Final Fantasy X Official Soundtrack, which contained 17 tracks from the original album on a single disk. This release had the catalog number TPCD-0211-2. Additionally, in 2001, prior to the game's release, Square released a promotional disk titled Final Fantasy X Promo CD, which contained edited versions of "Other World", "Zanarkand", and "Battle 1". The disk covers a length of 7:08, and was only released in Japan.

Final Fantasy X Original Soundtrack reached #4 on the Oricon charts, and sold 140,000 copies as of January 2010. The album was moderately well received; while some reviewers felt it to be an "absolutely amazing" soundtrack, others only found it to be a "satisfying" work. Some reviewers felt that of the three composers, Uematsu's pieces were the weakest, citing them as having a tendency to be "buried" under the compositions of the others. The same reviewers, however, noted that some of the best pieces on the soundtrack, such as "Zanarkand", were the work of Uematsu. Hamauzu's contributions were seen as some of his best work, and reviewers felt that both he and Nakano brought a "myriad of new flavors" to the soundtrack which were very well received. Final Fantasy X Official Soundtrack, although not re-released after the Original Soundtrack was brought to North America, was seen as a good sampler of the music from the full soundtrack.

Track listing

Disc one
No.	Title	Music	Length
1.	"'Listen to My Story'" (「全部話しておきたいんだ」 Zenbu Hanashite Okitai nda)	Masakazu Morita (voice actor for Tidus)	0:08
2.	"Zanarkand" (ザナルカンドにて Zanarukando nite, lit. "At Zanarkand")	Nobuo Uematsu	3:05
3.	"Prelude" (プレリュード Pureryūdo)	Uematsu	3:44
4.	"Tidus's Theme" (ティーダのテーマ Tīda no Tēma)	Uematsu	3:34
5.	"Otherworld" (Otherworld)	Uematsu	3:15
6.	"Run!!" (急げ!! Isoge!!)	Junya Nakano	2:40
7.	"This Is Your Story" (これはお前の物語だ Kore wa Omae no Monogatari da)	Nakano	2:21
8.	"Creep" (不気味 Bukimi)	Nakano	2:48
9.	"Battle Theme" (ノーマルバトル Nōmaru Batoru, lit. "Normal Battle")	Uematsu	3:22
10.	"Victory Fanfare" (勝利のファンファーレ Shōri no Fanfāre)	Uematsu	1:35
11.	"Game Over" (ゲームオーバー Gēmu Ōbā)	Uematsu	0:34
12.	"Out of the Frying Pan" (夢も希望もありません Yume mo Kibō mo Arimasen, lit. "No Hopes, No Dreams")	Uematsu	3:07
13.	"Leap in the Dark" (暗躍 An'yaku)	Nakano	1:27
14.	"Underwater Ruins" (海底遺跡 Kaitei Iseki)	Nakano	4:16
15.	"Oui Are Al Bhed" (チイはアルベド族 Chii wa Arubedo-zoku)	Uematsu	3:24
16.	"Enemy Attack" (敵襲 Tekishū)	Nakano	2:42
17.	"The Blitzers" (ブリッツに賭けた男達 Burittsu ni Kaketa Otoko-tachi)	Uematsu	3:53
18.	"Besaid" (ビサイド島 Bisaido-jima)	Masashi Hamauzu	4:44
19.	"Spira Unplugged" (スピラの情景 Supira no Jōkei, lit. "Spiran Scenery")	Uematsu, Hamauzu	2:49
20.	"Hymn of the Fayth" (祈りの歌 Inori no Uta, lit. "Song of the Prayer")	Uematsu, Hamauzu	0:44
21.	"Phantoms" (幻想 Gensō)	Nakano	3:46
22.	"The Trials" (試練の間 Shiren no Ma)	Uematsu	3:34
23.	"Hymn of the Fayth - Valefor" (祈りの歌～ヴァルファーレ Inori no Uta ~ Varufāre)	Uematsu, Hamauzu	0:42
24.	"The Summoning" (召喚 Shōkan)	Nakano	0:39
25.	"Braska's Daughter" (大召喚士の娘 Daishōkanshi no Musume)	Uematsu	3:46
26.	"Good Night" (おやすみ Oyasumi)	Uematsu	0:08

Disc two
No.	Title	Music	Length
1.	"Yuna's Theme" (ユウナのテーマ Yūna no Tēma)	Uematsu	3:30
2.	"Movement in Green" (萌動 Hōdō, lit. "Sprouting")	Uematsu, Nakano	3:16
3.	"The Sending" (異界送り Ikai Okuri)	Uematsu, Hamauzu	1:33
4.	"Calm Before the Storm" (嵐の前の静けさ Arashi no Mae no Shizukesa)	Uematsu	3:10
5.	"Hymn of the Fayth - Ifrit" (祈りの歌～イフリート Inori no Uta ~ Ifurīto)	Uematsu, Hamauzu	0:41
6.	"Luca" (ルカ Ruka)	Nakano	3:41
7.	"Grand Maester Mika" (マイカ総老師歓迎 Maika Sōrōshi Kangei, lit. "Welcoming Grand Maester Mika")	Nakano	1:16
8.	"Decision on the Dock" (不撓の決意 Futō no Ketsui, lit. "Unwavering Determination")	Nakano	1:12
9.	"The Splendid Performance" (The Splendid Performance)	Hamauzu	3:32
10.	"Face-Off" (対峙 Taiji)	Hamauzu	2:07
11.	"Blitz Off" (Blitz Off)	Hamauzu	3:32
12.	"Auron's Theme" (アーロンのテーマ Āron no Tēma)	Uematsu	2:44
13.	"Mi'ihen Highroad" (ミヘン街道 Mihen Kaidō)	Uematsu	3:23
14.	"Chocobo Jam" (ブラスdeチョコボ Burasu de Chokobo, lit. "Brass de Chocobo")	Uematsu	2:52
15.	"The Travel Agency" (旅行公司 Ryokō Kōshi)	Hamauzu	3:05
16.	"They May Pass" (通行を許可します Tsūkō o Kyokashimasu)	Uematsu	1:10
17.	"Seymour's Theme" (シーモアのテーマ Shīmoa no Tēma)	Uematsu	3:06
18.	"Twilight" (宵闇 Yoiyami)	Nakano	4:40
19.	"Djose Temple" (ジョゼ寺院 Joze Jiin)	Uematsu	3:18
20.	"Hymn of the Fayth - Ixion" (祈りの歌～イクシオン Inori no Uta ~ Ikushion)	Uematsu, Hamauzu	0:40
21.	"Ridess The Shoopuf?" (シパーフ乗るぅ？ Shipāfu Norū?)	Uematsu	4:12
22.	"Rikku's Theme" (リュックのテーマ Ryukku no Tēma)	Uematsu	4:02
23.	"Guadosalam" (グアドサラム Guadosaramu)	Nakano	3:23

Disc three
No.	Title	Music	Length
1.	"Thunder Plains" (雷平原 Kaminari Heigen)	Hamauzu	3:44
2.	"Jecht's Theme" (ジェクトのテーマ Jekuto no Tēma)	Uematsu	2:33
3.	"Macalania Woods" (マカラーニャの森 Makarānya no Mori)	Hamauzu	3:20
4.	"The Void" (霧海 Kirikai, lit. "Sea of Mist")	Nakano	2:19
5.	"The Temple Players" (寺院楽隊 Jiin Gakutai, lit. "Temple Orchestra")	Nakano	2:22
6.	"Seymour's Ambition" (シーモアの野望 Shīmoa no Yabō)	Uematsu	2:14
7.	"Hymn of the Fayth - Shiva" (祈りの歌～シヴァ Inori no Uta ~ Shiva)	Uematsu, Hamauzu	0:41
8.	"Pursuit" (迫りくる者たち Semari Kuru Mono-tachi)	Nakano	2:10
9.	"The Burning Sands" (灼熱の砂漠 Shakunetsu no Sabaku)	Hamauzu	3:46
10.	"Peril" (危機 Kiki)	Hamauzu	4:03
11.	"The Truth Revealed" (明かされた真実 Akasareta Shinjitsu)	Uematsu	4:06
12.	"Launch" (発進 Hasshin)	Hamauzu	3:29
13.	"The Wedding" (結婚式 Kekkonshiki)	Hamauzu	1:12
14.	"Assault" (襲撃 Shūgeki)	Hamauzu	4:06
15.	"Tragedy" (悲劇 Higeki)	Hamauzu	4:03
16.	"Believe" (私は飛べる Watashi wa Toberu, lit. "I Can Fly")	Hamauzu	1:27
17.	"Via Purifico" (浄罪の路 Jōzai no Michi, lit. "Path of Cleansing")	Uematsu	2:29
18.	"Hymn of the Fayth - Bahamut" (祈りの歌～バハムート Inori no Uta ~ Bahamūto)	Uematsu, Hamauzu	0:41
19.	"Moment of Truth" (審判の時 Shinpan no Toki, lit. "Time of the Trial")	Hamauzu	3:38
20.	"Patricide" (父を殺めた男 Chichi o Ayameta Otoko)	Uematsu	2:42
21.	"Suteki Da Ne (Isn't It Wonderful?)" (素敵だね Suteki da ne)	Rikki, Uematsu	5:34

Disc four
No.	Title	Music	Length
1.	"Yuna's Decision" (ユウナの決意 Yūna no Ketsui)	Uematsu, Nakano	3:42
2.	"Lulu's Theme" (ルールーのテーマ Rūrū no Tēma)	Uematsu	3:52
3.	"Bravely Forward" (勇ましく進め Isamashiku Susume)	Uematsu	3:25
4.	"Hymn of the Fayth - Yojimbo" (祈りの歌~ようじんぼう Inori no Uta ~ Yōjinbō)	Uematsu, Hamauzu	0:42
5.	"Servants of the Mountain" (極北の民 Kyokuhoku no Tami, lit. "Northern Tribe")	Hamauzu	4:42
6.	"Hymn of the Fayth - The Ronso" (祈りの歌～ロンゾ族 Inori no Uta ~ Ronzo-zoku)	Uematsu, Hamauzu	0:42
7.	"Wandering" (彷徨の炎 Hōkō no Honō, lit. "Wandering Flame")	Hamauzu	4:41
8.	"A Fleeting Dream" (いつか終わる夢 Itsuka Owaru Yume, lit. "A Dream Ends Someday")	Uematsu, Hamauzu	4:24
9.	"Hymn of the Fayth - Yunalesca" (祈りの歌～ユウナレスカ Inori no Uta ~ Yūnaresuka)	Uematsu, Hamauzu	0:42
10.	"Challenge" (挑戦 Chōsen)	Hamauzu	4:18
11.	"Beyond The Darkness" (深淵の果てに Shin'en no Hate ni, lit. "Beyond the Abyss")	Hamauzu	4:38
12.	"Gloom" (暗澹 Antan)	Nakano	4:28
13.	"Hymn of the Fayth - Spira" (祈りの歌～スピラ Inori no Uta ~ Supira)	Uematsu, Hamauzu	0:43
14.	"The Unsent Laugh" (死人が笑う Shibito ga Warau)	Uematsu	3:33
15.	"Fight With Seymour" (シーモアバトル Shīmoa Batoru, lit. "Seymour Battle")	Uematsu	5:46
16.	"Hymn of the Fayth - Anima" (祈りの歌～アニマ Inori no Uta ~ Anima)	Uematsu, Hamauzu	0:42
17.	"A Contest of Aeons" (召喚獣バトル Shōkanjū Batoru, lit. "Summoned Monster Battle")	Nakano	5:56
18.	"Final Battle" (決戦 Kessen, lit. "Decisive Battle")	Hamauzu	5:50
19.	"Ending Theme" (Ending Theme)	Uematsu	5:30
20.	"'Never Forget Them'" (「思い出してください」 "Omoidashite Kudasai", lit. "'Please Remember'")	Mayuko Aoki (voice actress for Yuna)	0:15
21.	"Suteki Da Ne (Isn't It Wonderful?) Orchestra Version" (素敵だね オーケストラ・ヴァージョン Suteki da ne Ōkesutora Vājon)	Rikki, Uematsu	6:19

=== feel/Go dream: Yuna & Tidus ===
feel/Go dream: Yuna & Tidus is an EP containing tracks composed by Nobuo Uematsu and inspired by pieces from the game. "feel" was based on the "Hymn of the Fayth", while "Go dream" was based on "Tidus' Theme". Music arrangements were done by Masashi Hamauzu, Tsuyoshi Sekito, Junya Nakano, and Masayoshi Kikuchi. Vocals are performed by Mayuko Aoki for the track "feel" and Masakazu Morita for the track "Go dream". A remix of "feel" was included as a bonus track in the Vocal Collection of Final Fantasy X. It was released in Japan by DigiCube on October 11, 2001, bearing the catalog number SSCX-10058. The EP reached #13 on the Oricon charts.

Track listing
No.	Title	Length
1.	"feel" (Yuna)	4:36
2.	"Go dream" (Tidus)	4:40
3.	"Endless Love Endless Road" (Yuna & Tidus)	5:40
4.	"feel (Instrumental)"	4:36
5.	"Go dream (Instrumental)"	4:41
6.	"Endless Love Endless Road (Instrumental)"	5:36

=== Piano Collections Final Fantasy X ===
Piano Collections Final Fantasy X is a collection of music from the original soundtrack arranged for the piano by Masashi Hamauzu, and performed by Aki Kuroda. Hamauzu intended the process of arranging the pieces to "consider the groundwork of individual compositions in order to transform these pieces into piano arrangements" rather than simply playing the themes on a piano as they originally sounded. It spans 15 tracks and covers a duration of 56:43. It was first released in Japan on February 20, 2002 by DigiCube with catalog number SSCX-10064, and was re-released on July 22, 2004 by Square Enix with catalog number SQEX-10028.

Piano Collections Final Fantasy X reached #89 on the Oricon charts and sold 2,900 copies. It was very well received, with reviewers finding it to be a "great" album, and stating that it was superior to most video game soundtracks, both piano or otherwise. They especially praised Hamauzu, terming him a "very skilled arranger and performer".

Track listing
No.	Title	Length
1.	"Zanarkand" (ザナルカンドにて Zanarukando nite)	3:18
2.	"Tidus' Theme" (ティーダのテーマ Tīda no Tēma)	4:07
3.	"Besaid" (ビサイド島 Bisaido-jima)	3:01
4.	"Hymn of the Fayth" (祈りの歌 Inori no Uta)	6:18
5.	"The Travel Agency" (旅行公司 Ryokō Kōshi)	3:00
6.	"Rikku's Theme" (リュックのテーマ Ryukku no tēma)	2:49
7.	"Guadosalam" (グアドサラム Guadosaramu)	3:08
8.	"Thunder Plains" (雷平原 Kaminari Heigen)	3:21
9.	"Assault" (襲撃 Shūgeki)	3:28
10.	"Via Purifico" (浄罪の路 Jōzai no Michi)	3:13
11.	"Suteki Da Ne (Isn't It Wonderful?)" (素敵だね Suteki da ne)	4:17
12.	"Yuna's Decision" (ユウナの決意 Yūna no Ketsui)	3:02
13.	"Servants of the Mountain" (極北の民 Kyokuhoku no Tami)	4:03
14.	"Final Battle" (決戦 Kessen)	3:54
15.	"Ending Theme" (Ending Theme)	5:34

=== Final Fantasy X Vocal Collection ===
Final Fantasy X Vocal Collection (ファイナルファンタジーＸ ボーカル・コレクション, Fainaru Fantajī Ten Bōkaru Korekushon) is a collection of vocal arrangements of pieces from the game arranged by Katsumi Suyama along with radio drama tracks, performed by the game's characters' voice actors in Japanese. It spans 14 tracks and covers a duration of 42:21. It was released in Japan on December 18, 2002 by DigiCube with catalog number SSCX-10073. The album was poorly received by critics. They found the album, while it had "pretty good" vocals, to have overall poor sound quality and a clichéd musical style. While "not a horrible album", they found that the collection was overpriced and under-produced. It reached #69 on the Oricon charts, and sold over 11,700 copies.

Track listing
No.	Title	Length
1.	"Monologue (Yuna)" (monologue~ユウナ~, "Monologue by Yuna")	1:59
2.	"Namida no Ato ni" (涙のあとに, "After Tears")	4:30
3.	"Monologue (Tidus)" (monologue~ティーダ~, "Monologue by Tidus")	1:44
4.	"A Ray of Hope"	4:22
5.	"Dialogue (Tidus, Wakka)" (dialogue~ティーダ、ワッカ~, "Dialogue Between Tidus and Wakka")	1:43
6.	"And On We Go"	3:59
7.	"Monologue (Rikku)" (monologue~リュック~, "Monologue by Rikku")	1:53
8.	"Get Happy!"	3:44
9.	"Dialogue (Yuna, Rikku, Lulu)" (dialogue~ユウナ、リュック、ルールー~, "Dialogue Between Yuna, Rikku, and Lulu")	1:33
10.	"All the Way"	4:05
11.	"Monologue (Auron)" (monologue~アーロン~, "Monologue by Auron")	1:27
12.	"Neji" (螺旋, "Spiral")	4:58
13.	"Epilogue (Tidus, Yuna, Rikku, Lulu, Wakka, Kimahri)" (epilogue~ティーダ、ユウナ、リュック、ルールー、ワッカ、キマリ~, "Epilogue by Tidus, Yuna, Rikku, Lulu, Wakka, and Kimahri")	1:57
14.	"Feel" (remix) (bonus track)	4:27

== Songs ==
=== Suteki da ne ===
"Suteki da ne" is one of the main theme songs of Final Fantasy X and the vocal version of Yuna's character theme. It was written by Nobuo Uematsu and Kazushige Nojima and was sung by Japanese folk singer Ritsuki Nakano, known as "Rikki", whom the music team contacted while searching for a singer whose music reflected an Okinawan atmosphere. "Suteki da ne" is sung in its original Japanese form in both the Japanese and English versions of Final Fantasy X. The song's title translates to "Isn't It Wonderful?" in English, and its lyrics were written by scenario writer Kazushige Nojima, while Uematsu composed the instrumentals and Shirō Hamaguchi arranged the instrumentals. An orchestrated version of the song is used as part of the ending theme.

The song was released as a single by DigiCube on July 18, 2001, and re-released by Square Enix on July 22, 2004. The disk also contains an instrumental version, an unrelated song entitled "Utikisama" ("The Moon"), and a vocal version of Aerith's theme song from Final Fantasy VII titled "Pure Heart". The single covers a duration of 20:35. The original release has a catalog number of SSCX-10053, and the re-release has a catalog number of SQEX-10029. The original release of "Suteki da ne" reached #10 on the Oricon charts, and sold 130,000 copies.

There is also an "autumn version" of the song, also performed by Ritsuki Nakano, released by Universal on October 3, 2001 on the "KANARIA" minialbum together with six unrelated tracks. The release has a catalog number of UMCK-1056. This version of the song, as well as all versions on the single, is also found on the Final Fantasy Single Collection bootleg CD, released by EverAnime with catalog number GM-496, by Archer Records with catalog number SA-007 and by Miya Records with catalog number MICA-0068. An official English translation of the song was created for the Distant Worlds: Music from Final Fantasy concert series and was first performed in Chicago by vocalist Susan Calloway on December 12, 2009.

=== Otherworld ===
"Otherworld", the opening theme of Final Fantasy X, was composed by Nobuo Uematsu with lyrics by Alexander O. Smith. It was sung by Bill Muir, the frontman of xtillidiex (pronounced "Till I die"), a death metal band active in Tokyo at the time. The song was already fully formed when Smith was tasked with writing lyrics for it based on a guide track. Smith's lyrics were loosely based on "The Song of Wandering Aengus", a poem by W. B. Yeats. Smith mistook a guitar solo section of the song as another part that he had to fill with lyrics, and so he wrote in a spoken words part in "one of those Limp Bizkit-style breakdowns". Uematsu liked the result and included it in the final song.

== Legacy ==
The Black Mages, a band led by Nobuo Uematsu that arranges music from Final Fantasy video games into a rock music style, have arranged three pieces from Final Fantasy X. These are "Fight With Seymour" from their self-titled album, published in 2003, and "Otherworld" and "The Skies Above", both of which can be found on the album The Skies Above, published in 2004. Uematsu continues to perform certain pieces in his Dear Friends: Music from Final Fantasy concert series. The music of FFX has also appeared in various official concerts and live albums, such as 20020220 Music from Final Fantasy, a live recording of an orchestra performing music from the series including several pieces from the game. Additionally, "Swing de Chocobo" was performed by the Royal Stockholm Philharmonic Orchestra for the Distant Worlds - Music from Final Fantasy concert tour, while "Zanarkand" was performed by the New Japan Philharmonic Orchestra in the Tour de Japon: Music from Final Fantasy concert series. An arrangement of "A Fleeting Dream" was performed on July 9, 2011 at the Symphonic Odysseys concert, which commemorated the music of Uematsu. Independent but officially licensed releases of Final Fantasy X music have been composed by such groups as Project Majestic Mix, which focuses on arranging video game music. Selections also appear on Japanese remix albums, called dojin music, and on English remixing websites.
