= Rikki (Japanese singer) =

Japanese folk singer

Rikki りっき
- Born: 中野 律紀 (Nakano Ritsuki); Amami Ōshima, Japan
- Years active: 1990s–present
- Website: office-rikki.com

Ritsuki Nakano (中野 律紀, Nakano Ritsuki), professionally known as Rikki (りっき), is a Japanese folk singer.

Born in Amami Ōshima, Japan, she began to sing traditional Japanese music when she was four years old. Later, at the age of 15, Rikki was the youngest winner ever to win the "Grand Prix" of the Japanese traditional folk music awards (known as All Japan Minyo awards). She first performed in Tokyo, Japan, at the prestigious Festival Konda Lota in 1992. She released her first single "Maten no Hoshi" (which means 'Sky Full of Stars') in December 1993, originally released in the Kyūshū region of Japan. Shortly thereafter, she produced her debut album, Kaze no Koe.

In 1998, Rikki was chosen to participate at the opening ceremony of the 1998 Winter Paralympics in Nagano, Japan, to sing the Paralympics theme song "Tabidachi no Toki".

Rikki sang the Final Fantasy X main theme, "Suteki da ne", released as a single on July 18, 2001. The single also included an instrumental version of "Suteki Da Ne", "Pure Heart" (a vocal arrangement of Aeris' Theme from Final Fantasy VII), and a new song entitled "Tsukisama" (which means 'The Moon'). Final Fantasy Distant Worlds VII, released March 7, 2025, included Rikki performing "Suteki da ne" live in concert.

In 2001, she produced an image album alongside Joe Hisaishi for the motion picture Spirited Away (directed by Hayao Miyazaki).

In 2006, Rikki joined the band Sound Horizon for the release of 5th Story CD: Roman. She was involved in Sound Horizon's releases until 2008, when she gave birth to twins and returned to Amami Ōshima, as she said in her blog. She returned to Sound Horizon in 2009 for their Triumph III live tour. She also returned to Sound Horizon in 2015 for the album 9th Story Nein.

== Discography ==
=== Albums ===
- Mucha Kana (21 May 1993) – re-released on 21 August 2002
- Kaze no Koe (16 December 1993)
- Taiyō no Shita de (24 August 1994)
- Rikki (16 December 1995)
- Miss You Amami (15 November 1998) – re-released in the UK on 15 June 2004
- Kanaria (3 October 2001)
- Mitsu (21 August 2002)
- Shimauta TRICKLES (25 September 2002)
- Musunu Shima He (19 January 2005)

=== Singles ===
- "Manten no Sora" (1 December 1993)
- "Tsubasa o Hiroge" (1 May 1994)
- "Suteki da ne" – featured in Final Fantasy X (18 July 2001), re-released by Square Enix on 22 July 2004
- "Karatachi Nomichi/Toki" (19 March 2003)
