= SaGa Frontier 2 =

1999 video game

- European cover art
- Developer: Square Product Development Division 2
- Publishers: JP: Square; NA: Square Electronic Arts; PAL: Square Europe
- Producer: Akitoshi Kawazu
- Designer: Jyunichi Shinomiya
- Programmer: Takaaki Tonooka
- Artists: Hiroshi Takai; Tomomi Kobayashi
- Writers: Miwa Shoda; Akitoshi Kawazu
- Composer: Masashi Hamauzu
- Series: SaGa
- Platforms: PlayStation, Nintendo Switch, PlayStation 4, PlayStation 5, Windows, iOS, Android
- Release: PlayStation: JP: April 1, 1999; NA: February 15, 2000; PAL: March 22, 2000; Switch, PS4, PS5, Windows, iOS, Android: WW: March 27, 2025
- Genre: Role-playing
- Mode: Single-player

SaGa Frontier 2 (サガ フロンティア 2, SaGa Furontia 2) is a role-playing video game developed and published by Square for the PlayStation. It is the eighth original game in the SaGa series. Initially released in Japan in April 1999, an English version was made available in North America in February 2000 by Square Electronic Arts and in PAL regions the following March by Square. Development for the title was headed by series creator Akitoshi Kawazu, with music by Masashi Hamauzu. The game features an art style unique to the series at the time it was released, utilizing hand-painted watercolor backdrops and characters to give the game a storybook feel. Like other SaGa games, gameplay is largely non-linear, giving the player multiple paths to follow in order to complete the game.

Set in the fictional world of Sandail, the game's plot, as well as location and character names, draw heavily from medieval Germanic and Anglo-Saxon influence. The game's plot is divided into two separate stories, with the player given the option to control either Gustave XIII, an exiled would-be heir on a quest to reclaim his throne, or William Knights, a young man investigating the death of his parents, with both scenarios eventually intertwining in a larger plot involving the fate of the world. SaGa Frontier 2 was met with generally positive reviews, with the Japanese version receiving three re-issues in June 2000, March 2002, and July 2006 respectively.

On March 27, 2025, an enhanced version of the game named SaGa Frontier 2 Remastered was announced during a Nintendo Direct presentation, and released on the same day for Nintendo Switch, PlayStation 4, PlayStation 5, PC via Steam, as well as iOS and Android mobile devices.

== Gameplay ==
Screenshot showing SaGa Frontier 2's watercolor-style graphics

SaGa Frontier 2 is a role-playing video game featuring two-dimensional character sprites on hand-drawn backgrounds. Players advance through the game by completing story-based missions and interacting with non-player characters to move the plot forward. At the start of the game, the player is given the option of assuming the role of one of two heroes, each with their own individual stories and objectives. Like previous titles in the SaGa series, the game's plot progresses in a mostly non-linear fashion, with a heavier emphasis on exploration and battling than adhering strictly to the narrative. While the player is restricted by the basic flow of the story, they are free to travel to many parts of the game world whenever they choose, and must traverse harsh dungeon environments and defeat enemies to affect their current place in the story.

Battles in SaGa Frontier 2 utilize a turn-based approach where the player must input specific commands for each character at the beginning of each combat round, with each action taking place in accordance with a character's speed rating. In any given round, player may choose to attack an enemy with an equipped weapon, as well as use magic spells to cause harm to their opponent or aid their allies. By continually attacking an enemy with weapons, characters randomly learn special weapon skills that can deal more damage, as well as combine with other party member's attack to form combo attacks. Combat scenarios are divided into three separate types, which are either selectable by the player or dictated automatically by the plot - Duel, which allows one-on-one combat; Team, where up to four characters may take part against an entire enemy group; or Strategic, which can contain a large number of characters in a strategy-like scenario. Each character may equip up to two different kinds of weapons, and may become more specialized in a particular field of combat by assigning them "roles", which increase their proficiency with certain weapon and spell combinations as well as give them additional abilities. By winning battles, characters may increase their statistics based on their actions in combat, thus becoming more powerful.

== Plot ==
SaGa Frontier 2 has two separate storylines: one is the history of Gustave XIII of the country of Finney, and the other concerns a character named Wil Knights. The game takes place in the land of Sandail, with the game's timeline spanning several decades.

Gustave XIII is the former prince of Thermes, the capital of Finney, and was intended to be the heir to the throne of his father, Gustave XII. The son is disinherited and exiled by his father when, at the age of 7, he fails to manifest any magical abilities, known as Anima, during a ritual known as the Firebrand Ceremony. His mother, Queen Sophie, unsuccessfully tries to prevent Gustave XIII's banishment. She and Gustave XIII are banished from the castle by Gustave XII and are forced to live in the slums of Thermes. Master Cielmer, a magician as well as teacher and councilor to Gustave XIII assists both mother and son in escaping Thermes and seeking asylum in the city Gruegel in the kingdom of Na. Despite being granted a mansion to live in by the king of Na, Gustave is still resentful of his rejection and lack of magical powers.

At age seventeen he apprentices as a blacksmith and learns to fight, and it is during his period his mother dies. He then moved to the city-state of Wide where he insinuates himself with the ruler and overthrows him. Five years later, Gustaves father dies, and at the behest of his best friend Kelvin decides to claim the throne. A war then breaks out between Gustave XIII and his half-brother in which Gustave conquers Finney and becomes the ruler of all the surrounding kingdoms except Na. This one holdout is controlled by Phillip, Gustave's brother, who blames Gustave for their mother's death. During the subsequent conflict, Gustave admits he lacks magical powers, and abdicates in favor of Phillip. Gustave then builds a city of his own called Hahn Nova, but it is overrun by monsters and burned to the ground. The fate of Gustave and his friends is left a mystery.

The secondary playable storyline in the game is that of Wil Knights, who is a member of a rich family of "diggers"; after the death of his parents, Wil relocated to the kingdom of Westia. At the age of fifteen Wil sets out to become a famous digger: after hearing about a legendary object known as "The Egg", Wil sets out to find it. After adventures in the Arctic region of Weissland, Wil becomes known as "Tycoon Wil", though he continues to search for the Egg. Wil then has a son named Rich who goes in search of the Egg and finds a young woman named Misty in possession of it. And even though his wife announces their baby girl Ginny has been born, he becomes obsessed with the woman and the Egg, and never returns from his quest.

The final part of the story involves Ginny Knights following the path of her father and grandfather in searching for the legendary object. Upon hearing of the evil powers of the Egg, and its role in leading her father to his death, Ginny decides to find and destroy the object. She eventually discovers the Egg is now possessed by "Fake Gustave", a pretender to the throne of Finney trying to take power in the wake of Gustave XII's death.

== Development ==
SaGa Frontier 2 was first announced in a September 1998 issue of Japanese The PlayStation magazine, where Square claimed the game would be taking a stylistic departure from the original SaGa Frontier released one year earlier, as well as confirming the title's release for spring 1999. A representative from the company stated that they would be abandoning the CG full-motion videos and computer-style graphics of the previous title to focus on a more traditional, hand-drawn look. The game's art style was achieved by using hand-drawn and painted artwork produced on a canvas that would be scanned and digitized to produce the game's backgrounds and character sprites. Many of the game's towns, locations, and characters draw heavily from medieval Germanic influence, with much of the story taking place within a fictional time-frame similar to the 13th century. New features not seen in the previous SaGa Frontier title include compatibility with the PlayStation's DualShock analog controller and PocketStation peripheral device for accessing additional content.

The North American version was announced at the 1999 Electronic Entertainment Expo in Los Angeles by Square. On February 15, 2000, the game was released in that region by Square Electronic Arts, and was made available in PAL regions the following March. A promotional movie for SaGa Frontier 2 was included on the SquareSoft 2000 Collector's CD Vol. 3, which was packaged with the initial North American release of Vagrant Story.

=== Music ===
While Kenji Ito served as composer for most of the previous SaGa games, the music for SaGa Frontier 2 was written by series newcomer Masashi Hamauzu, who had previously provided the soundtrack for Square's Chocobo no Fushigina Dungeon two years earlier. SaGa Frontier 2's music was recorded at Sunrise Studio in Tokyo, and on April 21, 1999, Square released the three-disc SaGa Frontier II Original Soundtrack in Japan courtesy of publisher DigiCube. The soundtrack features German track names to keep with the game's eastern European theme, and was popular enough to be re-issued on the Square Enix Music label in February 2006. In July 1999, an album called Piano Pieces "SF2" was released featuring piano renditions of music from the game, featuring arrangements from Hamauzu himself along with Naoko Endo, Daisuke Hara, Mikiko Saiki, Daisuke Karasuda, and Michiko Minakata.

== Reception ==
Original version

Aggregate score
Aggregator	Score
GameRankings	74%

Review scores
Publication	Score
CNET Gamecenter	6 / 10
Electronic Gaming Monthly	24 / 30 (Note: In Electronic Gaming Monthly's review of the game, one critic gave it 8/10, another gave it 8.5/10, and the rest gave it each a score of 7.5/10.)
EP Daily	8 / 10
Famitsu	35 / 40
Game Informer	8 / 10
GameFan	88% (Note: In GameFan's viewpoint of the game, three critics gave it each a score of 80, 90, and 95.) (G.N.) 83% (J.B.) 74%
GameRevolution	C
GameSpot	6.6 / 10
GameSpy	75%
IGN	7 / 10
Next Generation	4/5 stars
Official U.S. PlayStation Magazine	3.5/5 stars
RPGamer	7 / 10
RPGFan	(JP) 90% (US) 82%
The Sydney Morning Herald	3.5/5 stars

Upon its original PlayStation release, the game received "mixed or average reviews" according to the review aggregation website GameRankings. Eric Bratcher of NextGen said of the game, "If you thought FFVIII was unoriginal, this is the game for you. If you liked FFVIII, this is still the game for you." In Japan, Famitsu gave it a score of 35 out of 40. Game Informer gave the game a positive review while it was still in development.

GameSpot praised the Japanese import's art design in a time when three-dimensional computer graphics were becoming more prominent, stating "[t]he title's relaxed and flowing tones are a pleasant breeze of creativity when compared with most titles' CG, polygons, and pixel-perfect graphics. The unique presentation is SaGa Frontier 2s greatest strength, triumphantly stating: There is still a place for two-dimensional graphics." However, the website felt that the import may alienate fans of the original SaGa Frontier for taking too many liberties with gameplay and style, and that while players were still free to explore scenarios at their own pace, the story itself was more linear than the average SaGa title. SaGa Frontier 2's graphics were also praised by IGN who called the game "beautiful" with a "romantic soundtrack that is of the utmost quality. But it isn't too memorable." IGN's biggest problem with the title was its low replay value and weak presentation, which the website felt didn't take full advantage of the PlayStation's CD format by including an opening movie or character voices, ultimately calling it a "slightly above average game".

In one review, The Enforcer of GamePro said, "SaGa Frontier 2 comes to the battlefield ready to take on the RPG heavyweights with an excellent story-driven adventure that will appeal to the true diehard fan. If you've already finished FFVIII and [you] need another challenge, SF2 won't steer you wrong." (Note: GamePro gave the game 4/5 for graphics, 3.5/5 for sound, and two 4.5/5 scores for control and fun factor in one review.) E. Coli said in another review, "This is a promising year for Square with such releases as Front Mission 3, Legend of Mana, and Vagrant Story, just to name a few, waiting in the wings. While waiting for those titles to hit our shores, however, RPG fans will have SaGa Frontier 2 to lean on as a solid story that is sure to please role-players and strategy fans alike." (Note: GamePro gave the game two 4.5/5 scores for graphics and control, 3/5 for sound, and 4/5 for fun factor in another review.)

AllGame gave the game four-and-a-half stars out of five, saying that it "not only improves on the original American release, but sets a new watermark for other RPGs to follow. With so many things packed into this game, you'll be playing it for a long time. Once again, Square Soft has outdone themselves and rules the roost."

=== Sales ===
SaGa Frontier 2 was a best-seller in Japan. The game has sold over 675,000 units in Japan as of December 2004. Like SaGa Frontier, the game has been re-released several times over the years, once in 2000 as part of the Square Millennium Collection, again in 2002 as part of the PSone Books best-seller range, and again in 2004 as a part of the Square Enix Ultimate Hits line.

=== Remastered ===
Remastered

Aggregate score
Aggregator	Score
Metacritic	81 / 100

Review scores
Publication	Score
Nintendo Life	8/10 stars
Nintendo World Report	7 / 10
RPGFan	87%
Shacknews	8 / 10
The Games Machine (Italy)	8 / 10
CGMagazine	8 / 10
Cubed3	9 / 10
Digitally Downloaded	4.5/5 stars
Multiplayer.it	8 / 10
PSX Brasil	85%
TierraGamer	86%
Universo Nintendo	9 / 10

SaGa Frontier 2 Remastered, released in 2025, received generally favorable reviews according to the review aggregation website Metacritic.
