= Musashi: Samurai Legend =

2005 video game

- PAL region cover art
- Developer: Square Enix Product Development Division 5
- Publishers: WW: Square Enix; EU: Atari Europe
- Director: Yoichi Yoshimoto
- Producer: Takashi Tokita
- Designer: Tai Yasue
- Artists: Tetsuya Nomura; Takeshi Fujimoto
- Composers: Masashi Hamauzu; Junya Nakano; Yuki Iwai; Takayuki Iwai
- Platform: PlayStation 2
- Release: NA: March 15, 2005; JP: July 7, 2005; EU: September 9, 2005
- Genre: Action role-playing
- Mode: Single-player

Musashi: Samurai Legend, known in Japan as Musashiden II: Blade Master (武蔵伝II ブレイドマスター, Musashiden Tsū Bureido Masutā; "The Legend of Musashi II: Blade Master"), is a third-person action game developed by Square Enix in 2005 for PlayStation 2. Square Enix published the game in Japan and North America, while the game was released in PAL regions by Atari Europe.

Much like its predecessor, Brave Fencer Musashi, the game involves real-time combat in a 3D environment, and character designs by Tetsuya Nomura.

== Plot ==
In an unnamed oceanic fantasy world, exists a tribe of people known as the Mystics, who are peaceful magic users who travel throughout the world, and live harmoniously in their paradisaical city of Antheum, carried by the magical beast called the Anthedon, a large skybound whale, whom they honor as their source of magic and their means of travel to lands beyond. Years ago, Gandrake Enterprises, an energy technology megacorporation, came to power by their newfound invention of the Nebulium Engine, a remote perpetual energy device, allowing for the epoch of an era of technological innovation, a time known as the "Magic Steam Century". However, despite their revolutionary technologies allowing the world to ease their standards of living and bring about a new age, Gandrake Enterprises is revealed to have come through power by various robber baron-esque methods of business by their monopoly on their power source resource material, the mystical power imbued mineral known as nebulite, from corporate strong arming, intrigue, and coercion of the people by force, and their Nebulium Engine is revealed to be powered by the slave labor of magic users under their dominance to activate nebulite's latent energies and keep the Nebulium Engine running to maintain their grip on power over the world.

Aware of the threat Gandrake Enterprises poses to her people, young Mystic Princess Mycella prays in Antheum's sacred Chamber of Rites to enact the Vocatus Heroa, a powerful spell of faraway legend that had originated from a distant land, to summon a hero who will save her world from their sinister designs. However, an attack led by the Enterprises' Director of Administration, Rothschild, interrupts the ritual, which causes the summoned hero – Musashi – to land just a bit off course. He's found by old martial artist Master Mew, who immediately takes him under his wing. And immediately, Master Mew sends him into the heart of evil Gandrake Enterprises to rescue the captured Princess and thereby save the world.

For Musashi's dismay, President Gandrake kidnaps the Princess again to further the plots of his evil corporation to excavate the world's supply of nebulite and use the Mystic's power to enhance his Nebulium Engine to establish itself as a military power and rule the world. To stop Gandrake, and ensure that he can return to his world, Musashi goes in search of the Mystic's Five Maidens, five prodigal young women of great magical talent tasked to keep and protect the sacred Five Swords, five elemental magic swords bestowed by the spirits of the natural world and their pacts made with Mystics, that have been lost in order to restore power to the Anthedon for it to travel to lands where they have been captured and bring peace and end Gandrake's villainous plans once and for all.

== Gameplay ==
Musashi is primarily an action game, in which the player controls Musashi and fights enemies with sword moves. The character roams around a world in full 3D, moving in real time at will. He has two swords: the standard katana and a larger blade, which changes as the player progresses through the game. Short attacks and attack combos are performed with the katana, while the large blade is used for finishing attacks, slow hard-hitting attacks, or sword-specific special attacks. The player can use the swords to block attacks, and can "focus" on enemies to learn techniques that they are using. Many quests involve rescuing characters; when doing so, Musashi physically carries them, and in combat uses them as a battering ram or throws them in the air to perform attack combos before catching them again. The game's role-playing elements are limited to experience points, earned by defeated enemies, which are used to increase attributes like attack power and defense.

During the course of the game, the player travels around the game world performing quests; the world is centered around a single city, and Musashi journeys out from there to perform either the linear series of quests in the main plotline, or small side quests generally involving rescuing villagers. In addition to the regular gameplay, there are short segments involving motorcycle or airship combat, taking place on a set path rather than free-roaming.

== Music ==
The music of Musashi: Samurai Legend was composed primarily by Masashi Hamauzu and Junya Nakano, with a few contributions from Yuki Iwai and Takayuki Iwai of Wavelink Zeal. The Surf Coasters, a Japanese surf band, provided the main theme, "Samurai Struck".

The original soundtrack "Musashiden II: Blademaster Original Soundtrack" was released on July 21, 2005. Another album was released by the Surf Coasters which featured a full version of the opening theme.

== Reception ==
Reception

Aggregate score
| Aggregator | Score |
|---|---|
| Metacritic | 64 / 100 |

Review scores
| Publication | Score |
|---|---|
| Computer Games Magazine | 1.5/5 |
| Electronic Gaming Monthly | 5.83 / 10 |
| Famitsu | 32 / 40 |
| Game Informer | 8.25 / 10 |
| GameRevolution | C− |
| GameSpot | 7 / 10 |
| GameSpy | 3/5 |
| GameZone | 7.1/10 |
| IGN | 5.2 / 10 |
| Official U.S. PlayStation Magazine | 3/5 |
| RPGamer | 6 / 10 |
| RPGFan | 79% |

The game received "mixed" reviews according to the review aggregation website Metacritic. In Japan, however, Famitsu gave it a score of 32 out of 40.

The graphics were generally praised, but criticized for inconsistent frame rates: IGN called the "manga-shading" style "a neat trick", and GameSpot noted that it was a unique visual style, but both criticized the frequent slow-downs and IGN further criticized the repetitive environments. GameSpy felt that the graphics themselves were inconsistent, with good character designs but with environmental designs mixed between good and poor, depending on the area; 1Up.com, however, said that the graphics "were tough to criticize". Other aspects of the presentation were criticized: both GameSpy and GameSpot heavily panned the dialogue and voice acting, with GameSpot stating that the voices were poorly done and did not fit the game. IGN added that the game's "surf-rock score... barely makes sense". GamePro also disliked the game's camera system, saying that it worked for outdoors areas, but was difficult to control and see anything for indoors or arena areas, a point with which GameSpy agreed. (Note: GamePro gave the game two 4.5/5 scores for graphics and fun factor, and two 4/5 scores for sound and control.)

The gameplay also received mixed reviews: while several reviewers, such as GameSpy and GamePro, praised the gameplay as fun and exciting, GameSpot found combat to be too easy, making most of the gameplay elements pointless as basic attacks were enough to win most battles. IGN heavily criticized the "slow movement and long drawn out gameplay with too much backtracking", and even GameSpy's otherwise positive gameplay review called out Musashi as moving very slowly. The plot was largely ignored by reviewers as a serviceable platform to base an action game on—GameSpot termed it not especially deep, while GamePro felt it had enough characters and twists "to keep things moving along". 1Up.com and GameSpy concluded that the game "generally doesn't live up to the stature" of the previous Musashi game.

Musashi: Samurai Legend sold almost 58,000 units during the week of its release in Japan. By the end of 2005, it sold over 91,000 units in Japan.
