= Another Mind (video game) =

1998 video game

- Developer: Square
- Publisher: Square
- Director: Keizo Kokubo
- Producer: Koji Yamashita
- Composer: Junya Nakano
- Platform: PlayStation
- Release: JP: November 12, 1998
- Genre: Adventure
- Mode: Single-player

Another Mind (アナザー・マインド, Anazā Maindo) is an adventure game created by Square for the PlayStation and released on November 12, 1998, in Japan. The game is presented as live-action full-motion video sequences.

== Gameplay ==
The Dialogue System

Another Mind is primarily shown through a series of still photographs with text overlays advancing the story. The characters are represented by photographs of real actors, which are displayed whenever that character is speaking. Rarely a cutscene is used, featuring a movie of the actors interacting; the game uses the actors' real voices during these scenes, a rarity for the time. The player represents "another mind" residing in the head of the main protagonist, and can only control the game through speaking to the girl. The player does this by constructing their own sentences out of context-sensitive parts of speech provided by the game, rather than selecting from pre-made options.

The game is divided into ten chapters, each taking several hours to complete. There are multiple endings to the game, the majority of which are early, "bad" ends. There are two main endings to the game, as well as a third that can only be reached by playing through the game for a second time. During the game, the actions of the main character as guided by the player changes the course of the story and the relationships between her and the other characters.

== Plot ==
A 16-year-old girl named Hitomi Hayama is involved in a car accident and admitted to a hospital. Upon waking, she realizes that another mind has taken residence in her head. The player takes on the role of this separate consciousness. The pair are then put into the middle of a mystery that begins at the hospital, which includes a murder, several suicide attempts, and a bombing attempt. Hitomi frequently communicates back with the player, and the player must convince her to perform actions rather than commanding.

== Characters ==
The characters of the game include Hitomi Hayama (葉山 瞳) (played by Megumi Matsushita), a 16-year-old high school girl and the game's main character; her classmates Mariko Takagi (高木 真理子), Toshiki Kaneda (金田 俊樹), and Masato Kitagawa (北川 正人); and her teachers Ryouji Higuchi (樋口 良治) and Hitoshi Yamagata (山形 均). Other characters include Kaoru Murai (村井 薫), the nurse that took care of Hitomi while she was in the hospital; Teruo Myouen (明円 輝夫), a freelance reporter that is investigating an unsolved case at Wakaba High School; Natsuko Mukai (向井 夏子), Hitomi's psychotherapist; and Nanako Hiura (火浦 菜々子), a mysterious student from another school.

== Development ==
During the late 1990s, Square launched an initiative to foster talent within the company; small teams of younger developers would work with a smaller budget to create experimental titles for the PlayStation; one of these titles was Another Mind. Keizo Kokubo was the games director, having previously been the main programmer for Chrono Trigger and Romancing SaGa. The original idea for the game centered around the question of how to create a relationship between the player and the games protagonist. Kokubo worried that the game would not be given the go ahead, as at any given time there are many projects being experimented with. Executive Producer Hironobu Sakaguchi did not know whether to approve the proposal or not, and was reluctant to read it, but he was caught by the proposal for a "game drama" instead of a TV drama. The game features live actors, and the cast featured Kato Ito, Toshio Kakei, Tosei Kochi, and Shinji Yamashita. The amount of screen time in the game is relatively small as the acting is only shown for important plot points, but when it appears it takes the form of a full screen movie. Filming took three weeks to complete, with a schedule running from 7am to 10pm. Kokubo stated that the themes he wanted to explore in this "film" were ego and death. Originally, there was to be an episode between Chapters five and six called "Flash Highway", where the character Hitomi, who was driving with Mariko, predicts that an accident will occur on the highway. The player was then supposed to discover how to avoid or prevent the accident. However, there were many difficulties getting permission to film on the highway, so the episode was not included.

== Soundtrack ==
The soundtrack to the game, composed by Junya Nakano, was released as a separate album by DigiCube on November 21, 1998. The album, titled Another Mind Original Soundtrack, contains 24 tracks and spans a duration of 1:14:38. The soundtrack was composed using only the PlayStation's on-board synthesizer, and the tracks vary greatly in mood and pace.

== Reception ==
Chris Winkler of RPGFan, in his review of the game, termed the game as "bizarre". While praising the "stellar" music by Junya Nakano, he found that several of the game's idiosyncrasies made it difficult to get into. He called out the slow-moving text, the occasionally incomprehensible though "interesting" story, and the shallow attempts at humor as particular problems with the game, and recommended tracking down the game only for players "looking for a rather unique and very Japanese gaming experience".
