= Ultra Sports =

1995 video game series

- Arcade flyer
- Developer: Konami
- Publisher: Konami
- Platform: Arcade
- Release: WW: October 1995
- Genre: Sports
- Modes: Single-player; Multiplayer
- Arcade system: Ultra Sports

Ultra Sports (ウルトラ・スポーツ) is a sports video game series developed and published by Konami for the arcade. The two games in the series, Five A Side Soccer and Ultra Hockey, were released in October 1995.

== Gameplay ==
Both games in the Ultra Sports series feature a horizontal (cocktail) arcade cabinet featuring a top-down perspective of enclosed fields in five-versus-five matches. The cabinet houses a trackball and a single pass/shoot button for similar gameplay mechanics in both titles. The trackball is spun left or right to curve shots around opponents within a special techniques mode.

== Development and release ==
The Ultra Sports series was developed by Japanese corporation Konami. The games were prominently featured at 1995 American arcade trade shows like Amusement & Music Operators Association (AMOA) and the American Coin Machine Exposition (ACME). Its soccer and hockey iterations were released in October 1995. The use of attractive women on the cabinet side art meant they were likely intended to cater to sports bars. There were plans to release gridiron football and baseball iterations of the series in 1996. However, these never materialized. Former Konami of America president Ken Dirnberger relayed from a contact he had on the coin-op side of business that the US office promised the company big sales of the games if they followed their recommendations. These suggestions included sacrificing realism for faster gameplay, the style of the fields, and the style of the arcade cabinet. When the games failed commercially, the office's input was thereafter "limited to finding errors and editing the English voiceover and text."

== Reception ==
Play Meter reporter Greg Reeves briefly praised the series as "just good old fun" with "none of the technical complexity of other current sports games." Next Generation rated both games in the series three out of five stars. The reviewer called the overhead perspective and limited controls of Five A Side Soccer "a pleasing and fun effect" while finding that its simplistic, sprite-based graphics "make the sport accessible and competitive." The magazine summarized it "a fun and playable game that'll make recreational arcade-going more enjoyable." Reviewing Ultra Hockey, it was equally complimentary of the five-on-five setup as simplistic, accessible, and competitive to emulate "what's good about hockey: to be able to drive down the ice, hammer slapshots and pound opponents into the wall (without the pain)."
