= Front Mission: Gun Hazard =

1996 video game

- Developer: Omiya Soft
- Publisher: Squaresoft
- Director: Hideo Suzuki
- Producers: Yasuyuki Maeda; Kiyotaka Sousui
- Programmers: Hideo Suzuki; Yukihiro Higuchi
- Artist: Yoshitaka Amano
- Composers: Nobuo Uematsu; Yasunori Mitsuda; Junya Nakano; Masashi Hamauzu
- Series: Front Mission
- Platform: Super Famicom
- Release: JP: February 23, 1996
- Genre: Side-scrolling shooter
- Mode: Single-player

Front Mission: Gun Hazard (Note: Japanese: フロントミッションシリーズ ガンハザード, Hepburn: Furonto Misshon Shirīzu Gan Hazādo; lit. 'Front Mission Series: Gun Hazard') is a 1996 side-scrolling shooter game developed by Omiya Soft and published by Squaresoft for the Super Famicom. It was released only in Japan on February 23. Gun Hazard is the second entry in the Front Mission series and is a side-scrolling shooter with role-playing game elements. The game received an English language fan translation in 2004.

== Gameplay ==
As a side-scrolling shooter spin-off, the gameplay of Gun Hazard differs from the tactical role-playing game entries of the numbered Front Mission titles. Rather than being played out on a grid-based map and using a turn-based structure, battles takes place in real-time on scrolling 2D maps akin to Assault Suits Valken (titled Cybernator outside of Japan), a game which shared several key development staff with Gun Hazard. The player controls one character who pilots a bipedal mech known as a wanzer.

A player fighting an enemy

Game progression in Gun Hazard is done in linear manner: watch cut-scene events, complete missions, set up wanzers and vehicles during intermissions, and sortie for the next mission. The player travels to locations on a point-and-click world map.

In Gun Hazard, the player can leave the mech and explore. Another feature of Gun Hazard is its usage-based progression system. The usefulness of parts and weapons increases with prolonged usage; the more they are used in missions, the more effective they become.

== Story ==
Set in 2064, the story of Gun Hazard takes place all over the world in an alternate Front Mission universe. In the early 21st century, nations around the world fought over the control of natural resources. With natural resources dwindling in supply, the nations of the world eventually banded together to seek a solution to the growing crisis. Realizing the potential in space-based energy, they began development of an orbital elevator known as "Atlas" in 2024. As the orbital elevator's completion drew near, a breakthrough was achieved in miniature fusion reactors. The countries responsible for Atlas began to halt development of the orbital elevator and pursued miniature fusion reactor technology. Left unfinished, Atlas became a symbol of failed dreams and hopes as the world regressed back into a world of conflicts. One such conflict is the Bergen coup d'état in 2064.

=== Plot ===
The plot of Gun Hazard revolves around a soldier based in Bergen, Norway named Albert Grabner (whose parents reside Eningen, Germany). In January 2064, Ark Hellbrand of the Bergen Army stages a coup d'état in an attempt to overthrow the government led by President Moss Orwen. As the coup d'état forces begin to take over the country, President Orwen radios for assistance from NORAD and a faction of the Bergen Army loyal to him. Albert Grabner is sent to act as the president's bodyguard and helps him escape the country. However, the two are eventually captured by Hellbrand. Albert escapes from prison with the help of Brenda Lockheart, a mercenary employed by the Kernelight Association. Upon escaping Bergen and reaching New York City, they visit the Kernelight Association headquarters. Hoping to return to Bergen and rescue Orwen, Albert agrees to working for the Kernelight Association to find allies that can help him overthrow Ark. As the two work for the mercenary guild and travel to war-torn countries around the world, Albert begins to see a link between the civil conflicts, the Bergen coup d'état, and an organization only known as "The Society".

== Development and release ==
The game was developed by Omiya Soft, which had some members from Masaya, developer of Assault Suits Valken. Gun Hazard is the first spin-off entry and the second entry overall in the Front Mission series. The game takes place in a completely separate universe from the other Front Mission games.

Gun Hazard was unveiled at a Square of Japan press conference in early September 1995. It was released in Japan and published by Squaresoft, on February 23, 1996 for the Super Famicom game console.

It was also released on the Japanese Wii's Virtual Console service on May 20, 2008. The game later received an unofficial fan translation into English by the group Aeon Genesis.

== Music ==
The game's soundtrack was composed by Nobuo Uematsu and Yasunori Mitsuda, with additional tracks provided by Junya Nakano and Masashi Hamauzu. The soundtrack was the second collaboration between Nobuo Uematsu and Yasunori Mitsuda, after Chrono Trigger the previous year. According to Uematsu, Mitsuda worked so much on the soundtrack that he eventually had to be hospitalized.

The soundtrack has a "mechanical" theme to its music, and incorporates both electronic and traditional instruments. The music from the game was released on an album titled Front Mission Series: Gun Hazard Original Sound Track. It was released by NTT Publishing on February 25, 1996. Kero Hazel of Square Enix Music Online called the soundtrack album "a thumping example of fine industrial music" and complimented its use of other musical styles to influence that core style. Patrick Gann of RPGFan also praised the album as "downright awesome" and highly recommended it.

After the end credits, a voice sample quietly appears. This voice sample is from the uncensored version of the 1994 song "Dog Tribe" by UK hip hop group Fun-Da-Mental.

== Reception ==
Reception

Review scores
Publication	Score
Famitsu	8/10, 7/10, 7/10, 6/10
M! Games	73%
Nintendo Life	8/10
Official Nintendo Magazine	61/100
Super Game Power	4.2/5
Super Play	45%
Fun Generation	7/10
Gamers	92/100

According to Famitsu, Front Mission: Gun Hazard sold over 78,853 copies in its first week on the market. The game sold 184,044 by the end of 1996 and 300,000 copies in Japan in total. It also received generally favorable reviews from critics.
