= Brave Fencer Musashi =

1998 video game

- North American manual art
- Developer: Square
- Publishers: JP: Square; NA: Square Electronic Arts
- Director: Yoichi Yoshimoto
- Producer: Yusuke Hirata
- Artists: Koji Matsuoka; Tetsuya Nomura
- Writer: Koichi Ogawa
- Composer: Tsuyoshi Sekito
- Platform: PlayStation
- Release: JP: July 16, 1998; NA: November 12, 1998
- Genre: Platform
- Mode: Single-player

Brave Fencer Musashi (ブレイヴフェンサー 武蔵伝, Bureivu Fensā Musashiden; "Brave Fencer: The Legend of Musashi") is a 1998 platform video game developed and published by Square for the PlayStation. The game involves real-time sword-based combat in a 3D environment; it also features segments of voiced over dialogue and role-playing game elements such as a day-night cycle and resting to restore energy.

The story follows Musashi, a young swordsman who is summoned to a parallel world to defend the Allucaneet Kingdom from the Thirstquencher Empire. He searches for the Five Scrolls, which can enhance the powers of his sword, while interacting with people from Allucaneet and a nearby village.

Development began in early 1997, and was directed by Yoichi Yoshimoto, produced by Yusuke Hirata, and scored by Tsuyoshi Sekito. The game was a departure from Square's previous role-playing video games, which brought the team several difficulties during development. The game received a positive critical response; reviewers praised the graphics in comparison to other similar games of the time, and found the gameplay, especially the action elements, very compelling. Musashi received a sequel in 2005 for the PlayStation 2 under the name of Musashi: Samurai Legend.

== Plot ==
A young boy known as Musashi, reincarnated from the legendary Brave Fencer Musashi who saved the Allucaneet Kingdom from a monster called the Wizard of Darkness 150 years before, is summoned to Allucaneet by its ruler Princess Fillet to save it from the invading Thirstquencher Empire. Musashi is given the blade Fusion, and is charged with the task of obtaining Brave Fencer Musashi's sword – Lumina, the Sword of Luminescence – before the Thirstquencher Army does. Although Musashi has no intention of saving the kingdom, he agrees to do so in order to return to his homeland. After Musashi recovers Lumina, he finds that most of the people from the Allucaneet kingdom, including Fillet, have been kidnapped by the Thirstquencher Empire. In order to rescue all the residents from Allucaneet and defeat the Empire, Musashi starts searching for the Five Scrolls; each one holding an elemental power able to greatly augment the sword Lumina's powers.

With help from treasure hunter Jon, Musashi finds the Earth Scroll and defeats its crest guardian. After its defeat, half-vampire and half-zombie creatures known as Vambees appear in the nearby village. While searching for a way to stop the Vambees, Musashi finds the Water Scroll and defeats its crest guardian in the basement where the Vambees originate. While Musashi searches for the Fire Scroll, Musashi's rival, Kojiro, kidnaps Princess Fillet and uses her as a hostage to force a battle with Musashi. Once Kojiro is defeated, and Fillet is then rescued. Musashi then searches for thieves from the Thirstquencher Empire and makes his way to the next crest guardian. It is then revealed that Princess Fillet is actually one of Thirstquencher's thieves disguised, and that the real Fillet is still in their hands. Musashi then continues his journey, finds the Wind Scroll, and defeats its crest guardian in an ants' nest.

After finding the fifth and final Scroll, the Sky Scroll, Musashi discovers Thirstquencher's base, a floating ship known as the Soda Fountain. Musashi attacks the base and defeats the Sky Guardian. Thirstquencher's leader, Flatski, forces Musashi to give him Lumina in exchange for the Princess, and frees the Sky Crest. However, this unleashes the Wizard of Darkness, who was sealed within Brave Fencer Musashi's sword Lumina the entire time. It is also revealed by Jon that the original Brave Fencer Musashi sealed The Dark Wizard within the sword. Furthermore, it was Brave Fencer Musashi who entrusted the crests to the crest guardians to prevent The Dark Wizard's seal within Lumina from being broken. In effect, the present Musashi's quest merely aided The Dark Wizard's revival. Musashi recovers Lumina and uses it to defeat The Dark Wizard. After returning the Princess to Allucaneet Kingdom, Musashi takes Lumina to the place where he found it.

== Gameplay ==
Gameplay of Musashi in evening as described in the bottom right. The left bottom bar shows Musashi's health points as well as his "Bincho Energy".

Musashi is a platform game in which the title character, Musashi, fights a variety of enemies using his swords Fusion and Lumina and searches for five scrolls which will increase Lumina's strength and grant him new abilities. There are also several minigames and puzzles scattered throughout which must be completed to advance the plot. The two swords he uses have varied abilities and uses. Fusion, which resembles a katana, is used to chain rapid combo hits together and can also be used to absorb Bincho energy, which is a type of magical point system that controls how many spells a player can cast and how quickly, or absorb an enemies' skill. Lumina is a large, double-edged weapon which cannot be effectively used in combos by itself; instead, it can be imbued with elemental properties from Scrolls. Lumina is primarily offensive but in combination with the five elemental scrolls, it gains new skills. The two swords can be used in conjunction with certain techniques which are granted by various rescued townsfolk.

The game features an in-game clock and day-night system that affects the townsfolk and some of the creatures in the field (namely, the Minku - creatures from whom Musashi can obtain berries to increase his overall health stat), as well as forcing the player to pay attention to Musashi's fatigue rating that goes up over time with lack of sleep, which, if it becomes too low, it will have a harmful effect on Musashi's combat ability, and eventually, he will be forced to snooze on the spot, rendering him helpless until he recovers.

The player can either go to an inn to recover Musashi's health or make Musashi sleep outdoors without a full recovery and with danger he may be attacked by enemies. To pass time, the player may also opt to collect the various action figures – which resemble more detailed models of nearly all the characters and monsters – available at the town toy store, which stocks new items at the start of every chapter. Along the way, Musashi obtains parts from the Legendary Armor which allow him to perform actions such as climbing or performing double jumps.

== Development ==
Executive producer Hironobu Sakaguchi stated that the idea for the game first came up in February 1997. The original idea for Brave Fencer Musashi was having Miyamoto Musashi fighting in an alternate world from where he belonged. While the game was conceptualized as action-oriented, Musashi was originally meant to be a wanderer, but was later changed to an itinerant Samaritan in order to have him interacting and helping other characters. During development, the team used an action base which was crucial to the game's fighting mechanics. Director Yoichi Yoshimoto focused on the game's fully polygonal aspects that were a departure from Square's previous works. The development team prioritized the movement of polygons in real time and how light affected their appearance.

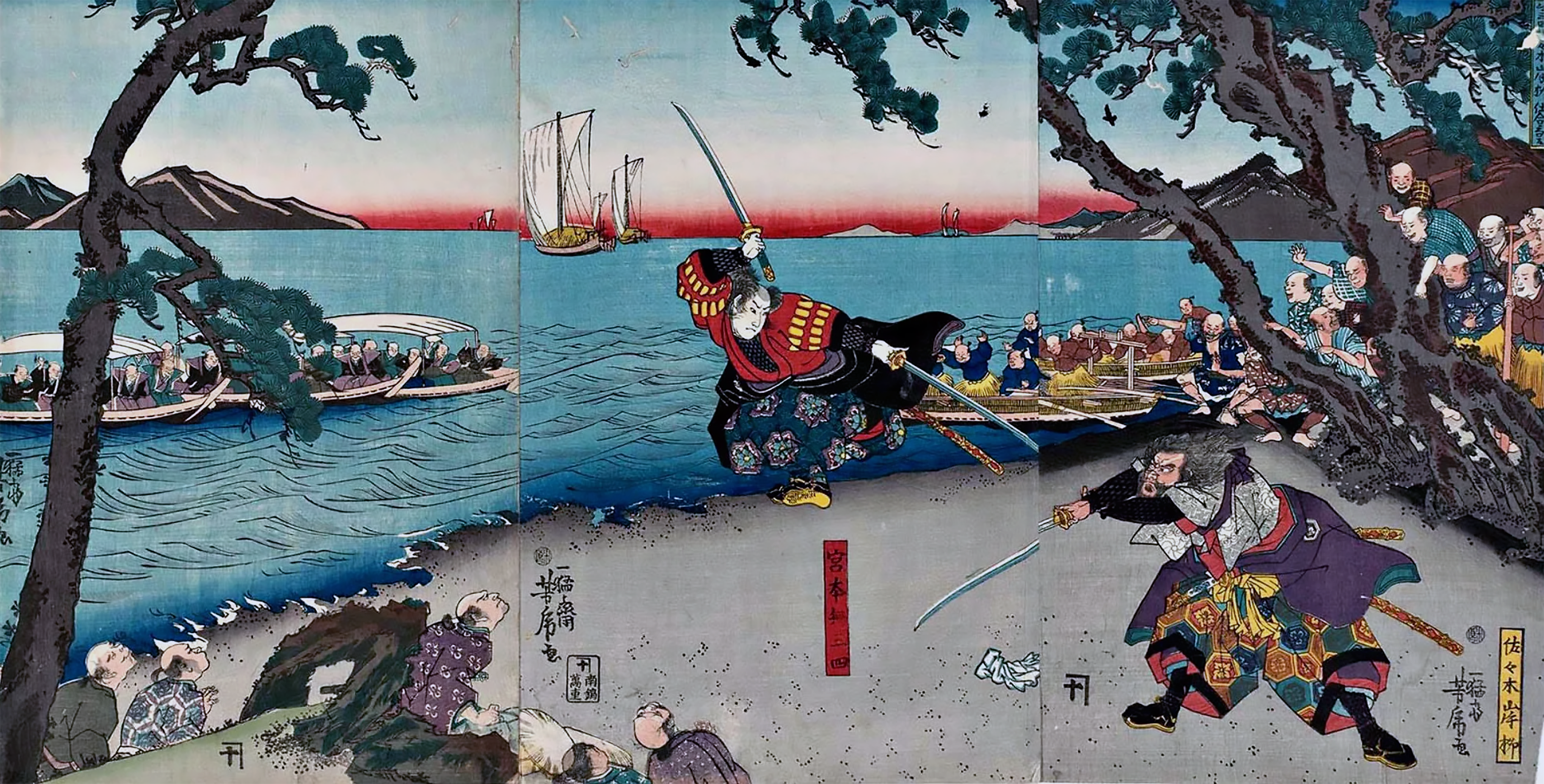
Climactic battle between Musashi Miyamoto (top) and Kojiro Sasaki (bottom)

The character, Kojiro, was based on the Japanese swordsman, Kojiro Sasaki. Both Musashi and Kojiro shared a lengthy account of rivalry, hence the same frictional relationship that was referenced between the two inside the game. The legend says the two swordsmen set up to duel each other. Musashi reportedly arrived several hours late to purposely anger Kojiro and his supporters. Another nod to Kojiro and the legendary duel is when Musashi found him and Princess Fillet on the shores of the Island of Dragons. This loosely referenced Ganryu Island, the appointed location were the long-time rivals held their famous duel.

When developing the characters for the game, Sakaguchi did not have a positive opinion of how popular the game would become. However, after the staff designed the graphics and the gameplay, he was surprised by the work, commenting that it was more interesting. The characters were designed by Tetsuya Nomura. When the game was localized for an English release, translators had to change alcohol-based names with soda-pop names due to problems with rating boards. This resulted in several jokes being lost in translation. The game's English title was changed from "Brave Fencer Musashiden" to "Brave Fencer Musashi" in order to avoid confusing non-Japanese players about the title character's name, as "Musashiden" means "Musashi's story".

The game's musical score was composed and produced by Tsuyoshi Sekito, who had never previously worked with Square. The Brave Fencer Musashiden: Original Soundtrack was released by DigiCube in Japan on July 23, 1998; it consists of 78 tracks spanning two compact discs in a boxset.

Brave Fencer Musashiden was shown at the Spring 1998 Tokyo Game Show, with a playable demo containing three areas.

After the game was done, the team was merged with those behind Parasite Eve II, Mana and Chrono Cross to make Final Fantasy XI.

== Release and legacy ==
Brave Fencer Musashi was originally released in Japan on July 16, 1998. It was re-released on June 29, 2000 as part of Square's Millennium Collection along with merchandise including postcards, a combination camera and cellphone strap, a handy strap, and keychain fobs. Another Japanese re-release was for the PlayStation Network on July 9, 2008. In the North American market, it was packaged on November 12, 1998 with the PlayStation 1998 Collector's CD Vol. 2, which contained a demo of Final Fantasy VIII.

A simplified Japan-exclusive mobile phone adaptation retitled Musashi: Mobile Samurai was released in 2005. After the release of the game, plans were made for a sequel, but were then delayed for years. A PlayStation 2 sequel, titled Musashi: Samurai Legend, was developed by Square Enix and was released worldwide in 2005. Square Enix released a montage video celebrating the game's 20th anniversary since its release on July 16, 2018.

== Reception ==
Reception

Aggregate score
Aggregator	Score
Metacritic	81 / 100

Review scores
Publication	Score
AllGame	4/5
CNET Gamecenter	7 / 10
Electronic Gaming Monthly	8.25 / 10 (Note: Two critics of Electronic Gaming Monthly gave the game each a score of 8.5/10, and two others gave it each a score of 8/10.)
EP Daily	10 / 10
Famitsu	32 / 40
Game Informer	7.75 / 10
GameFan	88% (Note: Three critics of GameFan gave the game each a score of 91, 85, and 88.)
GameRevolution	B
GameSpot	7.7 / 10
IGN	8.5 / 10
Next Generation	3/5
Official U.S. PlayStation Magazine	4/5
RPGamer	3 / 5
RPGFan	(Mus.) 83% (K.C.) 80% (R.B.) 79%

The game sold approximately 648,803 units in Japan during 1998, making it the 17th best-selling game of the year in that region. The game was given 32 out of 40 by Famitsu.

The game received "favorable" reviews according to the review aggregation website Metacritic. GameSpot reviewer James Mielke praised the graphics of the Japanese import, calling them "very well done" and superior to other Square RPGs of the time. IGN and GamePro's reviews by Randy Nelson and Robinson Hood, respectively, similarly praised the game's "excellent visual design". GameSpot and GamePro reviews also praised the voice acting quality, while Nelson noted the "stellar soundtrack" but found the voice acting to be annoying.

The gameplay was also positively received; for example, Robinson Hood shared his opinion that the game did well with management of the game's time. (Note: GamePro gave the game all 4.5/5 scores for graphics, sound, control, and fun factor.) Nelson and Robinson Hood both emphasized their enjoyment of the game's action elements. Mielke, while feeling that the action elements were the primary focus of the game, still liked the wide variety of role-playing elements present. Nelson, however, wished that the role-playing elements had been reduced even further in favor of the action parts of the game. All three reviewers compared the game to The Legend of Zelda, such as Mielke who had discussed the game to release as a direct competitor to that series. Both GameSpot and IGN felt that the comparison was invalid, as Musashi focused much more on action than role-playing, resulting in a game that was not a direct competitor at all.

Next Generation said, "At the heart of Brave Fencer is an engaging and challenging (if somewhat simple) journey with some very clever features and an endearing cast." Edge gave the Japanese import eight out of ten, saying, "With Square yet to release a truly bad game on the PlayStation, Brave Fencer Musashiden is yet another example of the ways in which the company is pushing the boundaries of its core RPG market without risking an expensive and reputation-damaging experiment. Gamers can only benefit."
