= Takahito Eguchi =

Japanese musician (born 1971)

Takahito Eguchi 江口 貴勅
- Born: August 28, 1971 (age 55); Nagasaki, Japan
- Genres: Video game music; electronic; jazz; orchestral; ambient; world
- Occupations: Composer; arranger; music producer; orchestrator; keyboardist
- Instruments: Keyboards, satsuma-biwa
- Years active: 1995–present
- Label: Wave Master
- Website: http://www.takahito-eguchi.com/

Takahito Eguchi (江口 貴勅, Eguchi Takahito; born August 28, 1971) is a Japanese composer, orchestrator, and musician. He is best known for collaborating with Noriko Matsueda on Final Fantasy X-2 and with Tomoya Ohtani on several Sonic the Hedgehog games. Eguchi became interested in music when he was six years old after hearing his neighbor playing the piano. He attended the Tokyo Conservatoire Shobi where he acquainted Matsueda.

Eguchi worked at Square Enix from 1998 to 2003 and currently works at Sega. He created mostly electronic music in the early part of his career but now focuses on orchestral composition and arrangement, along with performing keyboards.

== Biography ==
Born in Nagasaki, Japan, Eguchi became interested in music at the age of six when he heard his neighbor playing the piano. While his father, a judo athlete, initially tried to push him into pursuing sports, he eventually agreed to let him take piano lessons, as long as he agreed to study with his sister. Eguchi enrolled at the Tokyo Conservatoire Shobi, where he met long-term composing partner Noriko Matsueda. After graduating from the conservatoire, he produced numerous compositions, joined a band as a keyboardist, and worked as a software designer. He also gave Matsueda advice on music manipulation during her first game project, Front Mission, in 1995. At her request, he also arranged and orchestrated "Theme of Bahamut Lagoon ~ Opening" for the bonus disc of the original soundtrack to Bahamut Lagoon (1996).

Eguchi joined Square (now Square Enix) in 1998; his first job was composing the 1999 title Racing Lagoon alongside Matsueda. Although his role was minor compared to Matsueda's, he was responsible for the opening and ending themes, the majority of the battle themes, and the bonus track "Taiman Battle Remix". Eguchi and Matsueda collaborated once again in 2000 on the PlayStation 2 game The Bouncer. He created a lot more music than on previous soundtracks; a large amount of the music produced was not used in the game and there were also many post-production demands. He composed the pop ballad "Forevermore", which was arranged and provided lyrics by Narada Michael Walden and Sunny Hilden and performed by Shanice in "Love Is the Gift", the ending theme to the English-language versions of the game. The song was also sold as a single and featured in a promotional album. In 2002, Eguchi arranged the track "Hand in Hand -Reprise-" for Yoko Shimomura's score to Kingdom Hearts.

Eguchi reunited with Matsueda to compose Final Fantasy X-2 (2003). Despite mixed reviews by critics and a negative reception from fans, the soundtrack was commercially successful. He was also the game's orchestrator and the composer of the dual single "Real Emotion/1000 no Kotoba". In 2004, Eguchi and Matsueda composed Final Fantasy X-2 International + Last Mission and arranged three pieces in the Final Fantasy X-2 Piano Collection album, which both received better reviews than the official soundtrack. The Piano Collections album was their final project at while at Square Enix, which they both left afterward. Eguchi and Matsueda married in 2009.

Since his departure, he has been involved in several anime projects such as D.N.Angel (2003), Rental Magica (2007), and Trinity Blood (2005). He has also mixed Shimomura's arrangements for the Dark Chronicle Premium Arrange album and performed piano on her vocal album Murmur. In 2006, he contributed three compositions and two arrangements to the Xbox 360 game Sonic the Hedgehog; he also worked on the 2008 follow-up Sonic Unleashed. He has since worked on a number of Sonic Team games, such as Super Monkey Ball: Step & Roll, Sonic Colors, Sonic Generations, Rhythm Thief & the Emperor's Treasure, Sonic Lost World, Sonic Forces and Sonic Frontiers.

== Musical style and influences ==
Eguchi and Matsueda are noted for creating mainly jazzy and electronic tracks for the scores they have collaborated on; Eguchi is credited for most of the electronic music. The soundtrack to The Bouncer, of which Eguchi and Matsueda co-composed a lot of the pieces, featured among other genres rock, electronica, and jazz fusion. A professional pianist, Eguchi often utilizes the piano in his compositions. He has stated that most of the time he composes and arranges music is at his home studio, where his friends help out by recording acoustic instruments; if the quality of these recordings are not adequate, however, Eguchi replaces them at the company's studio. He has said that by the time he is finished creating the music, he is only sleeping three to four hours a week.

Since joining Sega Digital Studio in 2006, Eguchi has switched over to almost an exclusively orchestral style. On recent projects, he has assisted his fellow co-workers with string and keyboard arrangements, in addition to writing his own material.

He cites Igor Stravinsky, Ryuichi Sakamoto, and Miles Davis as musical influences. When asked about which musicians he would like to collaborate with, he replied, "A musician who has passed away, Miles Davis. There are too many living musicians to talk about. A few are Herbie Hancock, Aretha Franklin, and Ryuichi Sakamoto." His interest in composition came about after being inspired by a variety of jazz, electronic, modernist, and pop musicians.

== Works ==
Video games
Year	Title	Notes	Ref.
1999	Racing Lagoon	Music with Noriko Matsueda	
2000	The Bouncer	Music with Noriko Matsueda	
2003	Final Fantasy X-2	Music with Noriko Matsueda	
2006	Sonic the Hedgehog	Orchestrations	
2008	Sonic Unleashed	Cutscene music	
2010	Super Monkey Ball: Step & Roll	Keyboards, arrangements	
2010	Sonic Colors	Keyboards	
2011	Sonic Generations	Arrangements with several others	
2012	Rhythm Thief & the Emperor's Treasure	Music with Tomoya Ohtani and Naofumi Hataya	
2013	Sonic Lost World	Cutscene music, orchestrations	
2013	Rhythm Thief & the Paris Caper	Music with Tomoya Ohtani and Naofumi Hataya	
2015	Sonic Runners	Keyboards, arrangements	
2017	Sonic Forces	Cutscene music, orchestrations	
2019	Mario & Sonic at the Olympic Games Tokyo 2020	Arrangements	
2022	Sonic Frontiers	Cutscene music, orchestrations	
2025	Pokémon Legends: Z-A	Music, orchestrations	

Anime
Year	Title	Notes	Ref.
2003	D.N.Angel	Music with Tomoki Hasegawa	
2004	Mobile Suit Gundam SEED Destiny	Theme song arrangement	
2005	Gundam Evolve	Theme song arrangement	
2005	Trinity Blood	Music	
2007	Rental Magica	Music with Jun Ichikawa	
