= Mario & Sonic at the Rio 2016 Olympic Games =

2016 video game

- North American Wii U cover art
- Developers: Sonic Team; Arzest/Spike Chunsoft (3DS)
- Publishers: Nintendo; Sega (Arcade)
- Directors: Hiroshi Miyamoto (3DS); Eigo Kasahara (Wii U)
- Producer: Nobuya Ohashi
- Designers: Harumasa Nakajima (3DS); Shingo Kawakami (Wii U)
- Programmers: Keiichi Noda (3DS); Kouichi Nomura (Wii U)
- Artists: Hiroshi Kanazawa (3DS); Hitoshi Furukubo (Wii U)
- Composer: List of composers: Teruhiko Nakagawa Kenichi Tokoi Hidekuni Horita Mitsuharu Fukuyama Tomoya Ohtani Tadashi Kinukawa Jun Senoue Hiroyuki Anazawa Yutaka Minobe Naofumi Hataya (Wii U)
- Series: Mario & Sonic
- Platforms: Arcade, Nintendo 3DS, Wii U
- Release: Arcade: WW: February 2016; Nintendo 3DS: JP: February 18, 2016; NA: March 18, 2016; EU: April 8, 2016; AU: April 9, 2016; Wii U: JP: June 23, 2016; NA/EU: June 24, 2016; AU: June 25, 2016
- Genres: Sports, party
- Modes: Single-player, multiplayer

Mario & Sonic at the Rio 2016 Olympic Games (Note: Japanese: マリオ&ソニック AT リオオリンピック, Hepburn: Mario ando Sonikku atto Rio Orinpikku; lit. 'Mario & Sonic at the Rio Olympics') known as Mario & Sonic at the Rio 2016 Olympic Games: Arcade Edition for the Arcade version is a 2016 crossover sports video game developed by Sega's Sonic Team and published by Nintendo for the Wii U. A port for the Nintendo 3DS developed by Arzest and Spike Chunsoft was released the same year. It is the fifth and penultimate installment in the Mario & Sonic at the Olympic Games series. The game is officially licensed by the International Olympic Committee, as are the other games in the series. The game is a collection of Olympic sports themed mini-games featuring characters from the Mario series and the Sonic the Hedgehog series. It was based on the 2016 Summer Olympics.

The game received generally mixed reviews upon release. A sixth (and final) game in the series, Mario & Sonic at the Olympic Games Tokyo 2020, was released in November 2019 for the Nintendo Switch.

== Gameplay ==
The game features 42 playable characters from Mario and Sonic the Hedgehog franchises, as well as the option to use a previously made Mii character in-game. In the Nintendo 3DS version of the game, Mario, Sonic, and Mii are the only characters that can be used in all events; other returning characters are exclusive to two events while new characters are only playable in one. In the Wii U version of the game, all returning characters from previous games are usable in all events, while new playable characters (known as "guests" in-game) are only playable in one.

The characters new to the series that can be used in both versions of the game include Diddy Kong, Nabbit, Wendy O. Koopa, Larry Koopa, Rosalina, Dry Bowser, Jet the Hawk, Rouge the Bat, Wave the Swallow, Espio the Chameleon, Zavok, Sticks the Badger, and Zazz. In the Wii U version, Toad is featured as an exclusive character. In the 3DS version, Roy Koopa, Ludwig von Koopa, Dry Bones, Birdo, Dr. Eggman Nega, E-123 Omega, and Cream the Rabbit all appear as exclusive characters. Each character has their own individual statistics for 'power', 'speed' and 'technique', which affect the player's performance depending on the variables of the minigame.

Rugby Sevens, Archery, and BMX debut in the game alongside refined versions of returning events, such as athletics, volleyball, archery, swimming and equestrian.

Unlike prior installments, motion controls have been removed from a majority of events across both versions. The Wii U version's multiplayer mode requires at least all but one player to each use a Wii Remote, usually turned on its side, while allowing one other player to use a Wii U GamePad.

Each event is held in a re-creation of its corresponding venue in the actual 2016 Rio de Janeiro Olympic Games.

== Development ==
The game was first revealed on the Japanese Nintendo Direct website on May 30, 2015. Like the previous games, the game was officially licensed by the International Olympic Committee. Both versions of the game released worldwide in 2016. An arcade edition of the game was also announced by Sega, which was released in Japan in 2016. It was released in North America and Europe on June 24, 2016, alongside the Wii U version. Both versions of the game were delisted from the Nintendo eShop on December 26, 2017.

== Reception ==
Reception

Aggregate score
Aggregator	Score
Metacritic	3DS: 60/100; WIIU: 65/100

Review scores
Publication	Score
Famitsu	(Wii U) 8/10, 7/10, 7/10, 8/10
Nintendo Life	(Wii U) 5/10 (3DS) 5/10
Nintendo World Report	(Wii U) 7/10 (3DS) 6/10

On the review aggregator Metacritic, both the 3DS and Wii U versions of the game received "mixed or average" scores of 60 (based on 30 critics) and 65 (based on 26 critics) respectively. The game was criticised for being too similar to past installments of the Mario & Sonic series. Nintendo World Report gave the Wii U version a 7/10, stating "While the limited amount of events are the major downer here, I had fun playing them alone or with friends". In Japan, four critics from Famitsu gave the game a total score of 30 out of 40.

Stuart Andrews of TrustedReviews gave the Wii U version a 7/10, stating, "It's every bit as shallow and silly as previous titles, taking on a broad range of disciplines without ever really mastering any. Yet, if you're looking for a fun game to play with the family then it's one of the most enjoyable I've played this year."

== Notes ==
Preceded by London 2012	Official videogame of the Summer Olympic Games	Succeeded by Tokyo 2020
