= Music of the Front Mission series =

Music of the video game series Front Mission

Front Mission is a series of tactical role-playing games produced by Square Enix (originally Square). The music of the series includes the soundtracks to the main series, composed of Front Mission through Front Mission 5: Scars of the War, as well as the spin-off games, which include Front Mission Series: Gun Hazard, Front Mission Alternative, Front Mission: Online, Front Mission 2089 and its remake Front Mission 2089: Border of Madness, Front Mission 2089-II, and Front Mission Evolved. The soundtracks of the series' installments have been released in album form in Japan, with the exceptions of 2089, 2089-II, and Border of Madness, which reuse music from the other installments, and Evolved, which was published in 2010. The soundtrack to Front Mission was released in 1995 by NTT Publishing, which also published the soundtrack to Front Mission: Gun Hazard in 1996. DigiCube published soundtrack albums for Front Mission 2 and Alternative in 1997 and 3 in 1999. Square Enix published the albums for Front Mission 4 in 2004, and 5 and Online in 2006.

The soundtracks of the series have been warmly reviewed by critics, especially those of the main series and Gun Hazard. The music of Alternative and Online was less well received. The music of the series typically includes a fusion of electronic and orchestral music, though each game and composer in the series has taken the music in different directions. The composers for the series have included Yoko Shimomura, Noriko Matsueda, Koji Hayama, Hayato Matsuo, Hidenori Iwasaki, and Garry Schyman. A box set of music from across the series is currently planned, but has not yet been formally announced or given a release date.

== Main series ==
=== Front Mission ===
Front Mission Original Sound Version

Soundtrack album by Yoko Shimomura and Noriko Matsueda
- Released: February 25, 1995; October 1, 2004 (reprint)
- Length: 1:08:17
- Label: NTT Publishing

Front Mission Original Sound Version is a soundtrack album which contains music from Front Mission, the first game in the series. The tracks were composed by Yoko Shimomura and Noriko Matsueda; Shimomura penned the action themes while Matsueda handled the calmer tracks. The game was the first soundtrack that Matsueda had composed. Shimomura, a veteran of over a dozen games, was already at the time busy composing the soundtrack for Super Mario RPG but found herself unable to refuse to work on Front Mission after being asked by Sakaguchi to co-compose the music. Shimomura feels that the soundtrack turned out to be very "passionate" due to the two composers' motivation. The album has been described as containing a mix of techno and smooth jazz. The album was published by NTT Publishing on February 25, 1995 with the catalog number PSCN-5019, and was reprinted on October 1, 2004 with the catalog number NTCP-5019. The album contains 42 tracks and covers a duration of 1:08:17.

The album was well received by critics such as Daniel Kalabakov of RPGFan, who claimed that it was his favorite Super Nintendo Entertainment System-era Square soundtrack, primarily due to the mixture of techno and jazz. He preferred Shimomura's techno tracks, but enjoyed the way the two styles mixed together. Kero Hazel of Square Enix Music Online similarly praised the mix of the two styles, though he criticized the sound quality of the album and stated that the album would have been improved by using real instruments rather than synthesized ones.

In 2003, Front Mission was re-released for the PlayStation as Front Mission 1st, and a corresponding promotional sound track album was released as Front Mission 1st Special BGM Selection. The nine-track album contains eight tracks by Shimomura and Matsueda, arranged by Hidenori Iwasaki, and one new track by Iwasaki out of the five he composed for the remake. It was published by Square Enix on October 23, 2003 with the catalog number FM1-DA, and has a total length of 18:25. Patrick Gann of RPGFan described the album as a good sampler for the full soundtrack, and claimed that it had slightly better sound quality. He also felt that the new track was a good addition to the rest. Dave of Square Enix Music Online agreed with these praises, though he felt that the large amount of overlap between the promotional disc and the full soundtrack made its purchase not worthwhile.

Track list

Original Sound Version
No.	Title	Composer	Length
1.	"A Minefield"	Yoko Shimomura	1:27
2.	"Canyon Crow"	Shimomura	1:41
3.	"Rise to Action"	Noriko Matsueda	0:46
4.	"Advanced Guard"	Shimomura	1:39
5.	"Mercenaries"	Shimomura	1:55
6.	"Take the Offensive"	Shimomura	1:39
7.	"The Evils of War"	Shimomura	1:25
8.	"Decline"	Shimomura	1:26
9.	"Force Stall"	Matsueda	2:09
10.	"Manifold Irons"	Shimomura	2:42
11.	"Bloody Temperature"	Matsueda	1:48
12.	"Relative Thinking"	Matsueda	1:24
13.	"Holic Shot"	Shimomura	0:58
14.	"Hard Drag"	Shimomura	0:48
15.	"More and More"	Shimomura	0:53
16.	"Win Back"	Shimomura	0:10
17.	"Raise a Flag"	Matsueda	0:12
18.	"The General Situation"	Matsueda	1:52
19.	"Shallow Twilight"	Shimomura	1:46
20.	"Optical City"	Matsueda	2:24
21.	"Coaxial Town"	Shimomura	1:43
22.	"Field Hospital"	Shimomura	1:23
23.	"Arena"	Shimomura	1:13
24.	"Shop"	Matsueda	1:38
25.	"Bar"	Matsueda	1:26
26.	"Setting Up"	Shimomura	1:15
27.	"Military Government"	Matsueda	1:19
28.	"Ominous"	Matsueda	1:19
29.	"Martial Ecologist"	Shimomura	1:24
30.	"Rage! Rage! Rage!"	Shimomura	1:03
31.	"Tension"	Matsueda	1:22
32.	"A Person Easily Elated"	Matsueda	1:16
33.	"Kalen"	Matsueda	2:52
34.	"Elegie"	Shimomura	2:44
35.	"Natalie"	Matsueda	2:51
36.	"Fear"	Matsueda	1:43
37.	"Terrible Density"	Matsueda	2:03
38.	"Mad Pressure"	Matsueda	1:15
39.	"Destructive Logic"	Shimomura	2:07
40.	"Defeat"	Matsueda	0:17
41.	"Within Living Memory..."	Matsueda	4:48
42.	"Next Resolution"	Matsueda	2:12

1st Special BGM Selection
No.	Title	Composer	Length
1.	"A Minefield"	Yoko Shimomura	1:28
2.	"Rage! Rage! Rage!"	Shimomura	1:19
3.	"Shop"	Noriko Matsueda	2:16
4.	"The Evils of War"	Shimomura	2:47
5.	"More and More"	Shimomura	1:09
6.	"Kalen"	Matsueda	2:41
7.	"Martial Ecologist"	Shimomura	2:33
8.	"Theme of BlackHounds"	Hidenori Iwasaki	3:54
9.	"Defeat"	Matsueda	0:15

=== Front Mission 2 ===
Front Mission 2 Original Soundtrack

Soundtrack album by Noriko Matsueda
- Released: September 21, 1997
- Length: 1:15:45
- Label: DigiCube

The soundtrack of Front Mission 2, the second game of the main series and the third game released after Front Mission Series: Gun Hazard, was composed by Noriko Matsueda. It was her second solo video game soundtrack, after Bahamut Lagoon, and the fourth soundtrack she had worked on. The music of the game differs from that of its prequel in that it "incorporates an atmospheric, airy sound", and does not include pieces like Shimomura's techno tracks from the first game. An album of music from the game, titled Front Mission 2 Original Soundtrack, was released by DigiCube on September 21, 1997. The 43-track, 1:15:45-long album has a catalog number of SSCX-10011, and a limited edition of the soundtrack was also released.

The album was well received by critics. A reviewer from RPGFan termed it an "excellent soundtrack" that kept the feel of the first game. Kero Hazel of Square Enix Music Online felt similarly about the album. They noted that the soundtrack had enough thematic ties to the first game's music to connect the two games without losing originality, and concluded that it was superior to the already good Front Mission soundtrack.

Track list
No.	Title	Japanese title	Length
1.	"Opening Theme"	オープニングテーマ	2:43
2.	"Weapon Introduction"	武器紹介	3:33
3.	"Dark Clouds"	暗雲	2:17
4.	"Silence"	静寂	1:21
5.	"Shock"	驚愕	2:04
6.	"Tension"	緊張	1:47
7.	"Assault"	突撃	2:02
8.	"Lila's Theme"	リラのテーマ	2:19
9.	"Domingo Appears"	ドミンゴ出現	2:03
10.	"Relief"	休息	2:10
11.	"Sorrow"	哀	1:48
12.	"Madness"	狂気	1:22
13.	"Suspicion"	疑惑	1:30
14.	"Terror"	恐怖	1:29
15.	"Weariness"	疲労	1:44
16.	"Player Battle (Swift Attack)"	プレイヤー戦闘 (速攻)	2:15
17.	"Player Battle (Normal)"	プレイヤー戦闘 (通常)	1:45
18.	"Player Battle (Heavy)"	プレイヤー戦闘 (ヘビー)	1:54
19.	"Enemy Battle (Swift Attack)"	敵戦闘 (速攻)	1:43
20.	"Enemy Battle (Normal)"	敵戦闘 (通常)	1:39
21.	"Enemy Battle (Heavy)"	敵戦闘 (ヘビー)	2:03
22.	"Stage End (Relief)"	ステージエンド (安堵)	1:25
23.	"Stage End (Depression)"	ステージエンド (落ち込み)	1:22
24.	"Game Over"	ゲームオーバー	0:16
25.	"Level Up"	レベルアップ	0:11
26.	"Setup"	セットアップ	1:12
27.	"Sawallisch's Warehouse"	サバリッシュの倉庫	1:47
28.	"Army Camp"	軍キャンプ	1:24
29.	"City of Ducandy"	ドゥカンディの街	1:26
30.	"OCU P.O.W. Strategy Headquarters"	OCU捕獲作戦指令部	1:17
31.	"City of Diaraba"	ディアラバの街	1:51
32.	"City of Bornea"	ボーネアの街	2:08
33.	"Capital City Dhaka"	首都ダカ	1:18
34.	"Notun Comilla"	ノトゥンクミラ	2:16
35.	"Arena"	闘技場	1:18
36.	"Arena Battle"	闘技場バトル	0:50
37.	"Counter Bar"	カウンター・バー	1:36
38.	"Show Pub"	ショー・パブ	1:53
39.	"World Map"	ワールドマップ	1:37
40.	"Hatred"	憎悪	2:16
41.	"Ending (Repatriation)"	エンディング (帰還)	1:33
42.	"Ending (Garden)"	エンディング (庭)	0:53
43.	"Ending (Staff Roll)"	エンディング (スタッフロール)	4:25

=== Front Mission 3 ===
Front Mission 3 Original Soundtrack

Soundtrack album by Koji Hayama, Hayato Matsuo, Shigeki
- Released: September 22, 1999
- Length: 2:30:00
- Label: DigiCube

The soundtrack of Front Mission 3, the third game of the main series and the fifth game of the total series, was composed by Koji Hayama and Hayato Matsuo, with one track contributed by Shigeki. Matsuo handled the orchestral pieces, while Hayama worked on the techno ones. The pieces were performed with synthesizers that were designed to sound like higher-quality versions of the types of sounds used in the original Front Mission, rather than sounding more like the actual instruments they represented. Hitoshi Sakimoto worked for Square as an in-house composer during the game's development, and was the one who invited Matsuo, who was an independent composer, to meet the sound team and work on the game. An album of music from the game, titled Front Mission 3 Original Soundtrack, was released by DigiCube on September 22, 1999. The two-disc album has 47 tracks, is 2:30:00 long, and has a catalog number of SSCX-10035.

The album was well received by critics such as Kero Hazel of Square Enix Music Online, who noted that the synthesizer effects tied the music back stylistically to that of the original game, and applauded the contributions by both composers. A reviewer from RPGFan agreed, though he was more impressed with Hayama's pieces than those of Matsuo.

Track list

Disc 1
No.	Title	Japanese title	Length
1.	"The Government"	政府	1:51
2.	"Starting"	起動	2:29
3.	"City (Japan)"	街（日本）	2:40
4.	"Problem"	窮地	4:00
5.	"The Bar (All Purpose)"	酒場（凡用）	3:05
6.	"Infiltration"	潜入	4:08
7.	"Setup 1"	セットアップ１	3:35
8.	"Setup 2"	セットアップ２	2:47
9.	"Network"	ネットワーク	4:05
10.	"Base Invasion"	基地攻略	4:12
11.	"Impact"	衝撃	2:17
12.	"Silence"	静寂	2:41
13.	"Defensive War"	防戦	3:20
14.	"Anger"	怒り	3:07
15.	"VS Katatsu"	ＶＳ呉龍	4:06
16.	"City (China)"	街（中国）	2:55
17.	"The Bar (China)"	酒場（中国）	2:46
18.	"Hideout"	アジト	3:08
19.	"Escape"	脱出	2:27
20.	"Real Base"	基地本体	3:07
21.	"Research Lab"	研究所	3:01
22.	"Lukav 1"	ルカーブ１	2:59
23.	"Suspicion"	疑惑	1:14
24.	"Front Line Base"	前線基地	3:00
25.	"Attack"	進攻	4:30

Disc 2
No.	Title	Japanese title	Length
1.	"Rest 1"	休息１	4:13
2.	"Rest 2"	休息２	3:13
3.	"City (Ruins)"	街（廃虚）	3:02
4.	"Barilar"	バリラー	2:57
5.	"Plains (China)"	平原（中国）	4:05
6.	"Fort Invasion"	要塞攻略	4:00
7.	"Forest (Southeast Asia)"	森（東南アジア）	4:56
8.	"Enemy Attack"	敵襲	2:15
9.	"Scout Unit"	偵察部隊	3:53
10.	"Aggression"	侵略	5:04
11.	"VS IN Unit"	ＶＳ ＩＮ部隊	1:53
12.	"Sorrow"	哀	3:02
13.	"Lukav 2"	ルカーブ２	1:54
14.	"Oath"	誓い	3:48
15.	"Assault"	突撃	4:00
16.	"Decisive Battle"	決戦	4:31
17.	"Memory (Arisa)"	記憶（アリサ）	1:43
18.	"Swift Attack"	速攻	3:40
19.	"Stage End 1"	ステージエンド１	1:09
20.	"Stage End 2"	ステージエンド２	1:37
21.	"Game Over"	ゲームオーバー	1:10
22.	"Ending"	エンディング	6:25

=== Front Mission 4 ===
Front Mission 4 plus 1st Original Soundtrack

Soundtrack album by Hidenori Iwasaki, Ryo Yamazaki, Yoko Shimomura and Noriko Matsueda
- Released: May 10, 2004
- Length: 3:24:24
- Label: Square Enix

The soundtrack of Front Mission 4, the fourth game of the main series and the sixth game overall, was composed by Hidenori Iwasaki, with some tracks contributed by Ryo Yamazaki. The game was Iwasaki's first as a composer, as he had previously only worked as a synthesizer programmer. The music has been described as very different from the "very abstract and heavy" music of the previous game, and much more similar to the music of the first game with an emphasis on melody as well as light and thematic elements. The soundtrack also incorporates "South American"-style elements, with the use of pan flutes and tribal percussion. The music from the game was bundled with music from the remake of the first, Front Mission 1st, and the album was titled Front Mission 4 plus 1st Original Soundtrack. It was released by Square Enix on May 10, 2004. The four-disc album has two discs devoted to each game, and has 97 tracks. It is 3:24:24 long, and has catalog numbers of SQEX-10021~4.

The album was well received by Ben Schweitzer of RPGFan. Preferring the Front Mission 4 tracks to the 1st tracks, he complimented the album as "impressive", especially given that it was the "first work of a promising new composer". While he did not feel that all of the tracks were of consistent quality, he said that none of them were "bad" and that the more "atmospheric" tracks stood out as particularly noteworthy. Reviewers from Square Enix Music Online had similar praises and criticisms, calling it "not the most diverse or consistent of Front Mission scores" but still "highly worthy"; they also noted the atmospheric tracks as worthy of note.

Track list

Disc 1
No.	Title	Length
1.	"Assault"	3:38
2.	"Dust and Flames"	1:29
3.	"Red Alert"	1:44
4.	"Beginnings"	1:56
5.	"The Durandal"	1:04
6.	"Boot Camp"	2:19
7.	"Nexus News"	1:20
8.	"The Central Assembly"	1:37
9.	"Move Out!"	3:32
10.	"Mission Complete"	0:57
11.	"Clear Skies Over Europe"	2:35
12.	"Intruders"	2:48
13.	"Conspiracy"	2:08
14.	"Destinations"	1:56
15.	"Free Spirit"	2:35
16.	"Mayday"	0:27
17.	"Whispers"	2:53
18.	"Break Free"	2:41
19.	"Deserters"	1:36
20.	"Siege"	3:33
21.	"Peace of Mind"	3:03
22.	"Briefing"	1:25
23.	"Battle Plans"	1:20
24.	"Lock & Load"	3:34
25.	"Intermission"	1:14

Disc 2
No.	Title	Length
1.	"Aggressors"	3:24
2.	"Harbor Town"	3:07
3.	"Hostiles"	3:27
4.	"Game Over"	0:15
5.	"Grapevine"	2:32
6.	"War Machine"	0:44
7.	"Rampage"	4:18
8.	"Southern Breeze"	3:41
9.	"Knights of Steel"	2:56
10.	"To the Dragon's Lair"	1:28
11.	"The Revolutionary"	1:25
12.	"Leaden Sky"	1:40
13.	"Threat"	1:40
14.	"Expeditionary Fleet"	1:51
15.	"Brute Force"	2:09
16.	"Blauer Nebel"	2:58
17.	"Death of an Old Lion"	2:13
18.	"Voice of Reason"	0:38
19.	"Warmth"	1:50
20.	"Why Am I Here?"	2:58
21.	"Pride and Honor"	4:58
22.	"Requiem for a Soldier"	1:20
23.	"Iron Tempest"	4:04
24.	"Guiding Light"	1:38
25.	"Credits"	4:33

Disc 3
No.	Title	Length
1.	"A Minefield"	1:28
2.	"Canyon Crow"	1:43
3.	"Rise to Action"	0:48
4.	"Advanced Guard"	1:40
5.	"Mercenaries"	1:57
6.	"Take the Offensive"	1:45
7.	"The Evils of War"	1:27
8.	"Decline"	1:28
9.	"Force Stall"	2:10
10.	"Manifold Irons"	2:43
11.	"Bloody Temperature"	1:49
12.	"Relative Thinking"	1:25
13.	"Holic Shot"	1:00
14.	"Hard Drag"	0:57
15.	"More and More"	0:55
16.	"Win Back"	0:13
17.	"Raise a Flag"	0:14
18.	"The General Situation"	1:53
19.	"Shallow Twilight"	1:52
20.	"Optical City"	2:27
21.	"Coaxial Town"	1:52
22.	"Field Hospital"	1:28
23.	"Arena"	1:20
24.	"Shop"	1:44
25.	"Bar"	1:37
26.	"Setting Up"	1:22
27.	"Military Government"	1:25

Disc 4
No.	Title	Length
1.	"Ominous"	1:27
2.	"Martial Ecologist"	1:30
3.	"Rage! Rage! Rage!"	1:10
4.	"Tension"	1:30
5.	"A Person Easily Elated"	1:27
6.	"Kalen"	2:42
7.	"Elegie"	2:50
8.	"Natalie"	2:58
9.	"Fear"	1:47
10.	"Terrible Density"	2:12
11.	"Mad Pressure"	1:22
12.	"Destructive Logic"	2:17
13.	"Defeat"	0:18
14.	"Within Living Memory..."	4:38
15.	"Next Resolution"	2:11
16.	"Maria"	3:02
17.	"Driscoll"	2:14
18.	"BlackHounds"	2:48
19.	"New Enemy Turn"	2:22
20.	"Ending (U.S.N.)"	7:46

=== Front Mission 5 ===
Front Mission 5 ~Scars of the War~ Original Soundtrack

Soundtrack album by Hidenori Iwasaki, Kenichiro Fukui, Hayato Matsuo, Yasuhiro Yamanaka and Masayoshi Soken
- Released: January 25, 2006
- Length: 2:43:07
- Label: Square Enix

The soundtrack of Front Mission 5: Scars of the War, the sixth game of the main series and the ninth game overall, was composed by Hidenori Iwasaki and Kenichiro Fukui, with one track each provided by Hayato Matsuo, Yasuhiro Yamanaka and Masayoshi Soken. The music has been described as a mixture of "standard orchestral elements, with an emphasis on brass and drumlines, and electronic elements, such as synthesized percussion and techno-styled beats". The music differed from that of the previous game in its inclusion of tracks that were solely electronic, rather than a mixture of techno and orchestral. The music from the game was released on an album was titled Front Mission 5 ~Scars of the War~ Original Soundtrack. It was released by Square Enix on January 25, 2006. The three-disc album has 71 tracks, is 2:43:07 long, and has catalog numbers of SQEX-10055~7.

The album was very well received by reviewers such as Ben Schweitzer, who termed it "everything I could have hoped for". He felt that the soundtrack represented Iwasaki's maturation as a composer, especially in regards to the more action-based tracks. He concluded that the soundtrack was "superior" to that of Front Mission 4, and that it was also quite different from most video game soundtracks in regards to instrumentation and style. Square Enix Music Online also noted the improvement between Front Mission 4 and 5, and declared that, despite Iwasaki's skill with atmospheric tracks, that the battle tracks were the best of the album.

Track list

Disc 1
No.	Title	Length
1.	"Children of the War"	1:12
2.	"Island of Hope"	0:43
3.	"Invasion"	1:28
4.	"First Conflict"	0:31
5.	"Purpose"	0:42
6.	"Guardians of the Peace"	3:11
7.	"A Soldier's Scars"	1:38
8.	"Basic Training"	3:28
9.	"Downtime"	3:12
10.	"Red and Blue Stars"	1:17
11.	"Patrol"	1:29
12.	"Stratagems"	2:07
13.	"War of the Titans"	4:27
14.	"Victory"	0:52
15.	"Recollections"	1:39
16.	"Contact"	1:05
17.	"Mr. Kato"	0:58
18.	"Across the Dunes"	4:02
19.	"Intercept"	1:35
20.	"Keepers of Freedom"	4:47
21.	"Scramble"	2:16
22.	"Under Siege"	4:05
23.	"Defeat"	0:20
24.	"Lock and Load II"	3:41

Disc 2
No.	Title	Length
1.	"Listen Up"	2:49
2.	"For Home and Country"	0:51
3.	"Goliath"	0:39
4.	"Defenders"	4:25
5.	"Out of the Blue"	2:39
6.	"Memoria Ferita"	0:30
7.	"Casualties of War"	1:03
8.	"Ode to the Fallen"	1:25
9.	"Tempered Blade"	1:58
10.	"Flight of the Wyverns"	1:18
11.	"Mechanized Infantry"	3:43
12.	"Ghost Dog"	2:17
13.	"Natural Selection"	4:19
14.	"Covert Ops"	0:47
15.	"Incoming"	0:27
16.	"Quicksilver"	4:15
17.	"Revelations"	3:08
18.	"Muzzle Flash"	4:18
19.	"Revelations II"	1:29
20.	"R & R"	1:38
21.	"Survivor"	3:18
22.	"Breaking Limits"	2:44
23.	"Last One Standing"	1:01
24.	"Visions"	5:13

Disc 3
No.	Title	Length
1.	"Ne M'Oubliez Mie"	1:00
2.	"Seek & Destroy"	3:50
3.	"Grim Reaper"	2:07
4.	"Ambush"	0:49
5.	"Primary Objective"	3:06
6.	"Whiteout"	6:15
7.	"Swarm"	0:29
8.	"Iron Demon"	3:23
9.	"Accelerator"	5:50
10.	"Engram"	1:41
11.	"Deliverance"	6:07
12.	"Recollections II"	0:56
13.	"Angel Wings"	1:14
14.	"Always"	1:41
15.	"Scars of the War"	5:52
16.	"A New Beginning"	0:43
17.	"Memories"	1:07
18.	"Antechamber"	0:38
19.	"Gladiators"	2:25
20.	"Basic Training II"	3:28
21.	"Blue Stream"	2:13
22.	"Gunslinger"	1:01
23.	"Fifth Front"	0:53

== Spinoffs ==
=== Front Mission: Gun Hazard ===
Front Mission Series Gun Hazard Original Sound Track

Soundtrack album by Nobuo Uematsu, Yasunori Mitsuda, Junya Nakano and Masashi Hamauzu
- Released: February 25, 1996
- Length: 2:30:25
- Label: NTT Publishing

Front Mission: Gun Hazard was the first spin-off game in the series, and the second game released overall. Its soundtrack was composed by Nobuo Uematsu and Yasunori Mitsuda, with additional tracks provided by Junya Nakano and Masashi Hamauzu. The soundtrack was the second collaboration between Nobuo Uematsu and Yasunori Mitsuda, after Chrono Trigger. According to Uematsu, Mitsuda worked so much on the soundtrack that he eventually had to be hospitalized. The soundtrack has a "mechanical" theme to its music, and incorporates both electronic and traditional instruments. The music from the game was released on an album titled Front Mission Series: Gun Hazard Original Sound Track. It was released by NTT Publishing on February 25, 1996. The two-disc album has 60 tracks, is 2:30:25 long, and has catalog numbers of PSCN-5044~5.

Kero Hazel of Square Enix Music Online called the soundtrack album "a thumping example of fine industrial music" and complimented its use of other musical styles to influence that core style. Patrick Gann of RPGFan also praised the album as "downright awesome" and highly recommended it.

Track list

Disc 1
No.	Title	Japanese title	Length
1.	"GUN HAZARD"	GUN HAZARD	3:00
2.	"Crisis"	危機	1:56
3.	"MISSION COMPLETE"	MISSION COMPLETE	1:06
4.	"PULL OUT"	PULL OUT	0:50
5.	"Last Words"	最期の言葉	0:27
6.	"TENSION"	TENSION	2:40
7.	"Iron Footsteps"	鉄の足音	3:43
8.	"Shiver"	戦慄	2:31
9.	"MOVE"	MOVE	0:52
10.	"A STORE KEEPER"	A STORE KEEPER	3:08
11.	"VOICE OF ARK"	VOICE OF ARK	1:58
12.	"The President's Desperate Struggle"	大統領の死闘	0:52
13.	"Ominous Wind"	不吉な風	2:55
14.	"SILENCER"	SILENCER	2:06
15.	"ESCAPE"	ESCAPE	1:56
16.	"RICHARD MILLMAN"	RICHARD MILLMAN	2:34
17.	"CENKTRICH"	CENKTRICH	3:27
18.	"Enemy Raid"	敵襲	1:55
19.	"Pleasant Advance"	快進撃	2:37
20.	"INVASION"	INVASION	2:17
21.	"WARNING ONE"	WARNING ONE	1:38
22.	"WARNING TWO"	WARNING TWO	3:23
23.	"GENOCE"	GENOCE	2:53
24.	"Sorrowful Carillon"	哀しみのカリオン	4:02
25.	"Encounter"	出会い	2:00
26.	"MONOLOGUE"	MONOLOGUE	2:25
27.	"SECRET STORY"	SECRET STORY	3:42
28.	"GALEON"	GALEON	2:22
29.	"SNEAK AND ATTACK"	SNEAK AND ATTACK	2:10
30.	"Azure Sky"	碧空～あおぞら～	2:11
31.	"NOTICE"	NOTICE	2:05
32.	"RESISTANCE"	RESISTANCE	1:53
33.	"Naval Fortress"	ナヴァル要塞	2:38

Disc 2
No.	Title	Japanese title	Length
1.	"ROYCE FELDER"	ROYCE FELDER	2:39
2.	"A RUNNING FIGHT"	A RUNNING FIGHT	1:39
3.	"A-R-K"	A・R・K	2:04
4.	"Wreckage"	残骸	2:48
5.	"CAVERN"	CAVERN	4:06
6.	"SPARK SHOT"	SPARK SHOT	2:25
7.	"202"	202	3:23
8.	"Pursuit"	追撃	1:32
9.	"Blind Spot in Broad Daylight"	白昼の死角	2:13
10.	"UNEASY"	UNEASY	2:42
11.	"MESSAGE OF GENOCE"	MESSAGE OF GENOCE	2:39
12.	"Determination"	決意	1:50
13.	"GARDIAN"	GARDIAN	2:44
14.	"SENTINEL"	SENTINEL	1:47
15.	"TRAP"	TRAP	2:48
16.	"EDEL RITTER"	EDEL RITTER	1:52
17.	"NATURE"	NATURE	2:47
18.	"Royce's Death"	ロイスの死	1:59
19.	"EVIL POWER"	EVIL POWER	2:31
20.	"ATLAS"	ATLAS	4:51
21.	"APPROACH TO A SHRINE"	APPROACH TO A SHRINE	3:16
22.	"FINAL MISSION"	FINAL MISSION	2:52
23.	"Impatience"	焦燥	3:07
24.	"Promise ~ENGAGEMENT~"	約束～ENGAGEMENT～	2:08
25.	"Heaven's Door"	天空の扉	1:01
26.	"EMOTION"	EMOTION	6:19
27.	"TRIAL ZONE"	TRIAL ZONE	4:11

=== Front Mission Alternative ===
Front Mission Alternative

Soundtrack album by Riow Arai
- Released: November 21, 1997; November 22, 2006 (reprint)
- Length: 1:12:39
- Label: DigiCube; Square Enix (reprint)

Front Mission Alternative was the second spin-off game in the series, and the fourth game released overall. Its soundtrack was composed by Riow Arai. Arai was a "mainstream dance musician", who had previously composed the soundtrack for Sega Touring Car Championship. For the game, which unlike previous ones in the series was a real-time strategy game, Arai composed a techno soundtrack. The music has been described as "drastically different from the rest of the series". The soundtrack was released on the Front Mission Alternative album by DigiCube on November 21, 1997, and was reprinted by Square Enix on November 22, 2006. The album has 16 tracks, is 1:12:39 long, and has the catalog number of SSCX-10010 in its first issuance and SQEX-10081 for its second. The soundtrack album release was preceded by a promotional vinyl release in July 1997 with the catalog number of SSCX-20010, containing six tracks from the game.

The album was poorly received by Chris Greening of Square Enix Music Online, who called it a largely unsuccessful experiment due to its "repetitiveness and inappropriateness". He felt that several of the tracks went on for far too long without any change, and that the music did not fit the game due to Square not providing feedback to Arai about how the tracks were to be used. Greg Kasavin of GameSpot, in his review of the game, called the soundtrack "a bunch of dizzying techno that doesn't suit the onscreen grandeur".

Track list
No.	Title	Length
1.	"Opening"	2:05
2.	"Sandtown"	5:32
3.	"Jungle"	7:10
4.	"Woods"	6:49
5.	"Rock"	6:05
6.	"Beach"	8:06
7.	"Port"	4:51
8.	"Night"	2:25
9.	"Town01"	3:49
10.	"Town02"	4:20
11.	"Desert"	3:17
12.	"Bonus"	4:22
13.	"Airport"	3:30
14.	"Defeat"	3:17
15.	"Under"	3:29
16.	"Ending"	3:24

=== Front Mission: Online ===
Front Mission Online Original Soundtrack

Soundtrack album by Hidenori Iwasaki
- Released: September 20, 2006
- Length: 1:13:19
- Label: Square Enix

Front Mission: Online was the third spin-off game in the series, and the eighth game released overall. Its soundtrack was primarily composed of arrangements of music from prior games in the series, though a few original tracks were composed by Hidenori Iwasaki. The arranged music covered every prior game with the exception of Gun Hazard, and was arranged by Iwasaki from the compositions of Iwasaki, Hayato Matsuo, Yoko Shimomura, Noriko Matsueda, Ryo Yamazaki, and Riow Arai. The music was published as a 35-track album by Square Enix on September 20, 2006. The 1:13:19 album has a catalog number of SQEX-10078.

Chris Greening of Square Enix Music Online gave the album a poor review, calling it "a mediocre effort". He found the majority of the arrangements to be lackluster and unimaginative. Ben Schweitzer of RPGFan, however, was less harsh in his review of the album, calling it "a positive look at the entire series" and saying that the majority of it was good, though the original tracks were not particularly strong.

Track list
No.	Title	Japanese title	Length
1.	"Unsung Heroes"	Unsung Heroes	5:21
2.	"Break Free"	Break Free	1:57
3.	"Military Government"	Military Government	1:55
4.	"City of Ducandy"	ドゥカンディの街	2:19
5.	"Airport"	Airport	3:14
6.	"Destinations"	Destinations	2:16
7.	"Advanced Guard"	Advanced Guard	2:30
8.	"Break Free II"	Break Free II	1:52
9.	"Win Back"	Win Back	0:44
10.	"Edge"	Edge	1:04
11.	"Terrible Density"	Terrible Density	2:33
12.	"Arena"	闘技場	2:23
13.	"On the March"	On the March	1:35
14.	"Aggression"	侵略	3:19
15.	"Manifold Irons"	Manifold Irons	2:19
16.	"Assault"	突撃	2:59
17.	"Shadow Weaving"	Shadow Weaving	2:54
18.	"Chain of Command"	Chain of Command	2:09
19.	"Tension"	緊張	2:58
20.	"Room"	Room	2:14
21.	"Fear"	Fear	1:09
22.	"Dark Flames"	Dark Flames	1:13
23.	"Strategies"	Strategies	1:15
24.	"Force Stall"	Force Stall	1:51
25.	"Hostiles"	Hostiles	2:35
26.	"All-Out War"	All-Out War	2:33
27.	"The Evils of War"	The Evils of War	2:13
28.	"Player Battle (Normal)"	プレイヤー戦闘 (通常)	2:09
29.	"Player Battle (Heavy)"	プレイヤー戦闘 (ヘビー)	2:04
30.	"In the Name of Honor"	In the Name of Honor	1:47
31.	"Madness"	狂気	2:02
32.	"Level Up"	レベルアップ	0:10
33.	"More and More"	More and More	0:40
34.	"Silent Rain"	Silent Rain	1:23
35.	"End of All Aggressions"	End of All Aggressions	1:40

=== Front Mission Evolved ===
Front Mission Evolved Original Soundtrack / Mission 01 to 05

Soundtrack album by Garry Schyman
- Released: September 30, 2010
- Length: 23:47
- Label: Square Enix

Front Mission Evolved was the fourth spin-off game in the series, and the eleventh game released overall. It was composed by Garry Schyman, the first non-Japanese composer for the series or any other major Square Enix series. He was brought onto the project by Double Helix Games, who developed the game for Square Enix. Garry Schyman describes the music as "orchestral and mostly tonal" with a heavy militaristic theme; almost all of the music is combat or action-themed. The music is more traditionally orchestral than previous Front Mission soundtracks, and was recorded with a live orchestra. As Square Enix intended the game and its music to be a departure from previous games in the series, Schyman purposely did not listen to any of the music from prior games.

The soundtrack is not planned to be released as a physical album, though it is also planned to be included in a box release of music from the entire series. A sampler album of music from missions 01 to 05 from the game's single player campaign was released by Square Enix on the iTunes and Mora music stores on September 30, 2010, under the title Front Mission Evolved Original Soundtrack / Mission 01 to 05. This digital album contains 14 tracks and has a length of 23:47. The final track is a bonus tune done by DJ Kaya, "Military Tune/α：Kalen".

Track list
No.	Title	Length
1.	"Evolution/Dylan's Theme"	1:18
2.	"Wanzer Theme"	1:36
3.	"Our Hero Arrives"	1:47
4.	"Battle for Manhattan"	1:41
5.	"To the Tower"	1:34
6.	"For my father"	1:38
7.	"Fire of Apollo"	1:36
8.	"Percival Falls"	1:36
9.	"The End is the Beginning"	1:32
10.	"1st Flight"	1:36
11.	"Island Assault"	1:32
12.	"The Art of War"	2:05
13.	"Evolution Remix"	3:05
14.	"Military Tune/α：Kalen"	4:19

== Other games and legacy ==
The other games in the series are the cell phone games Front Mission 2089 and Front Mission 2089-II, and the Nintendo DS remake of 2089, Front Mission 2089: Border of Madness. 2089, 2089-II, and 2089: Border of Madness did not include any new music, instead reusing music from prior games in the series. There have not been any album releases of their music. In addition to the soundtrack albums, two songs composed by Shimomura from Front Mission, "Take the Offensive" and "Manifold Irons", were orchestrated for her Drammatica: The Very Best of Yoko Shimomura album.
