= Racing Lagoon =

1999 video game

- Developer: Square Product Development Division 2
- Publisher: Square
- Director: Hitoshi Sasaki
- Producer: Akitoshi Kawazu
- Designer: Tsukasa Fujita
- Programmer: Tetsuji Iwasaki
- Artist: Takaharu Matsuo
- Writer: Motomu Toriyama
- Composers: Noriko Matsueda; Takahito Eguchi
- Platform: PlayStation
- Release: JP: June 10, 1999
- Genres: Racing video game Role-playing
- Modes: Single-player, multiplayer

Racing Lagoon (レーシングラグーン, Rēshingu Ragūn) is a 1999 video game developed and published by Square. The game is unique in that it combines street racing with role-playing elements. The game's story follows a new member of a street racing team in 1999 Yokohama, Japan as he tries to learn about his forgotten past and a mysterious race that took place ten years prior to the game's opening.

Released for the PlayStation, the game is compatible with the Sony PocketStation. The game's music was composed by Noriko Matsueda as a jazz/techno fusion; she was joined by Takahito Eguchi as his first compositional role, and the soundtrack was released as an album. The game received mixed reviews in Japan and was never released outside of the country, but still sold over 140,000 copies. An English fan translation for the game was released in November 2021.

== Gameplay ==
The game features street races that are initiated by flashing headlights at other drivers. Players are able to customize their car colors and other parts, and beating another driver entitles the player to pieces of the defeated car. The game features two modes: a "High Speed Driving RPG" mode, where the player drives around taking missions and racing other drivers, and a "2 Warriors Battle Mode", where the player simply competes in races. The RPG mode is the primary portion of the game.

== Story ==
Racing Lagoon takes place in Yokohama, Japan, in 1999, and centers on several groups of street racers. 10 years prior to the game an event called "Fastest Legend" took place. One night, Team Bay Lagoon Racing (BLR), a five-member team led by "The Ace", Ikki Fujisawa, holds a race against Night Racers Honmuku (NR). The story follows one of BLR's newly joined members, Sho Akasaki, who is just beginning his racing career. Akasaki is determined to find out about the mystery of the "Fastest Legend", as well as his forgotten past.

== Development ==
The game's story was greatly influenced by the illegal street racing that occurred in Japan during the 1980s, and many of the cars used were recreated exactly for the game, although it did not feature any automaker licensing. The game is also noted for its linguistics, where monologues and dialogues (including loading screen quotes) are written in a poetic manner and often features words written in English; this accent, called Lagoon-go (ラグーン語), has been cited as a challenge in creating a fan translation for the game.

== Music ==
The game's soundtrack was composed by Noriko Matsueda, with a few tracks contributed by Takahito Eguchi; it was Eguchi's first compositional role. The music has been described as a jazz/techno fusion, with "fast-paced" music that includes live recordings of saxophones.

== Release ==
Racing Lagoon was released on June 10, 1999 for the Sony PlayStation. The game managed to sell over 141,000 copies in Japan by the end of 1999. The soundtrack was released as an album on June 19 the same year by DigiCube. The two-disc album features 62 tracks and covers a duration of 2:31:03. The game was re-released on March 20, 2002 for the PlayStation under the PS One Books line.

In 2014, a Racing Lagoon event was held in Square Enix's mobile game Spirit Yankee Soul. Racing Lagoon's scenario writer, Motomu Toriyama served as scenario director for the event.

== Reception ==
Reception

Review scores
Publication	Score
Famitsu	26/40
Famitsu PS	21/40
Joypad	5/10
Video Games	4/5
Gamers	12/20

The game was not well received by the Japanese gaming publication Famitsu PS, scoring only a 21 out of 40. Weekly Famitsu was a bit more favorable, giving it a score of 26 out of 40. The game was voted #45 for "most wanted sequels" by Famitsu's readers.

A retro review by Kotaku noted that the game's jazz-fusion soundtrack was one of the best of the PlayStation era.
