= Noriko Matsueda =

Japanese composer

- Born: December 18, 1971 (age 54); Tochigi, Japan
- Genres: Jazz
- Occupation: Composer
- Instrument: Piano
- Years active: 1995–2004
- Labels: NTT Publishing; DigiCube; Avex Group

Noriko Matsueda (松枝 賀子, Matsueda Noriko; born December 18, 1971) is a Japanese former video game composer. She is best known for her work on the Front Mission series, The Bouncer, and Final Fantasy X-2. Matsueda collaborated with fellow composer Takahito Eguchi on several games. Composing music at an early age, she began studying the piano and electronic organ when she was three years old. She graduated from the Tokyo Conservatoire Shobi, where she met Eguchi.

She joined Square (now Square Enix) in 1994, where she created music for nine games. Her last credited work was Final Fantasy X-2's piano arrangement album, Final Fantasy X-2 Piano Collection from 2004, after which she decided to leave the company alongside Eguchi. She composed mostly jazz music for the scores she worked on.

== Biography ==
Born in Tochigi, Japan, Noriko Matsueda began creating music at an early age. She received a scholarship in music at the age of three and went on to study the piano and electronic organ. Matsueda took various composition and performance courses at the Tokyo Conservatoire Shobi, where she also met long-term collaborator Takahito Eguchi. She joined Square in 1994, where her first assignment was to score the 1995 title Front Mission alongside Yoko Shimomura. She subsequently contributed the track "Boss Battle 1" to Chrono Trigger, arranged by Nobuo Uematsu. Matsueda's first solo work was Bahamut Lagoon, which also represented her first collaboration with Eguchi, who arranged and orchestrated "Theme of Bahamut Lagoon ~ Opening" for the bonus disc of its original soundtrack. In 1996, she created the composition "Tower Block" for the multi-composer game Tobal No. 1. The following year, she created the soundtrack to Front Mission 2.

In 1999, Matsueda and Eguchi made their first major collaboration by scoring the role-playing racing game Racing Lagoon, with synthesizer programmer Ryo Yamazaki providing three tracks. Matsueda was responsible for all the music except the battle, opening, and ending themes. They collaborated again on the soundtrack to the PlayStation 2 title The Bouncer in 2000, whereas the two took a more equal share of the music. A large amount of the compositions produced was not used in the game and there were also many post-production demands. Afterward, Matsueda created 25 pieces of background music for Square's PlayOnline viewer used for Final Fantasy XI and Tetra Master.

She reunited with Eguchi to create the soundtrack to Final Fantasy X-2 in 2003, with Matsueda contributing most of the setting themes. Having replaced Final Fantasy's regular series composer Nobuo Uematsu to create a work entirely different from the predecessor Final Fantasy X, their score received mixed reviews from critics and backlash from fans, but was commercially successful regardless. The following year, she worked on Final Fantasy X-2's international version Final Fantasy X-2 International + Last Mission and provided three arrangements to the Final Fantasy X-2 Piano Collection album, which were both better received by critics. The Piano Collections album was her last credited work, and she has since left Square Enix along with Eguchi.

== Musical style and influences ==
Matsueda is noted for her jazzy style, which she often incorporated into the soundtracks she worked on; she also touched on genres like jazz fusion, lounge, and ambient. For the scores that she collaborated on with Eguchi, she was responsible for most of the jazzy tracks, while Eguchi provided the majority of the electronic music. Matsueda has said that the best qualities of a composer are their curiosity and sensitivity, and that watching many things, listening, touching, and feeling are important factors in composition. When asked why she creates music, Matsueda replied that she feels it is an appropriate way to express herself.

She cites George Gershwin, Herbie Hancock, Chick Corea, Igor Stravinsky, and Gustav Mahler as musical influences. When composing music for games, Matsueda draws inspiration from all parts of the game, including the story, the world view, the personality of the characters, the graphics, and the tone of color. She has stated that she makes the music thinking about the goal of the sounds for the game and its total balance.

== Works ==
Video games
Year	Title	Role	Co-worker(s)	Ref.
1995	Front Mission	Composition/arrangement	Yoko Shimomura	
1995	Chrono Trigger	Composition (1 song)	Yasunori Mitsuda and Nobuo Uematsu	
1996	Bahamut Lagoon	Composition/arrangement		
1996	Tobal No. 1	Composition/arrangement	Yasunori Mitsuda, Masashi Hamauzu, Junya Nakano, Ryuji Sasai, Yasuhiro Kawakami, Kenji Ito, and Yoko Shimomura	
1997	Front Mission 2	Composition/arrangement		
1999	Racing Lagoon	Composition/arrangement	Takahito Eguchi	
2000	The Bouncer	Composition/arrangement	Takahito Eguchi	
2003	Final Fantasy X-2	Composition/arrangement	Takahito Eguchi	
Other works
Year	Title	Role	Co-worker	Ref.
2002	Final Fantasy X Vocal Collection	Composition	Takahito Eguchi, Yoko Shimomura, Naoki Masumoto, Takeharu Ishimoto, and Nobuo Uematsu	
2004	Final Fantasy X-2 Piano Collection	Arrangement	Takahito Eguchi, Hiroko Kokubu, Masahiro Sayama, and Febian Reza Pane	
