= Music of Final Fantasy X-2 =

Music from the video game Final Fantasy X-2

The music of the video game Final Fantasy X-2 was composed by Noriko Matsueda and Takahito Eguchi. Regular series composer Nobuo Uematsu did not contribute any of the music, despite having composed around half of the soundtrack for the first game, Final Fantasy X. The Final Fantasy X-2 Original Soundtrack was released on two Compact Discs in 2003 by Avex. After the release of Final Fantasy X-2 International + Last Mission, an album entitled Final Fantasy X-2 International + Last Mission Original Soundtrack composed of the songs added to the soundtrack for that game was released in 2003 by Avex. Final Fantasy X-2 Piano Collection, a collection of piano arrangements of the original soundtracks by Noriko Matsueda, Takahito Eguchi, Hiroko Kokubu, Masahiro Sayama, and Febian Reza Pane, was released by Avex in 2004.

A single by Koda Kumi entitled real Emotion/1000 no Kotoba, based on the theme song for the game and the ending credits song, was published by Rhythm Zone prior to the game's release in 2003. Another single, titled Kuon: Memories of Waves and Light – Music from Final Fantasy X-2, was released by Avex in 2003 along with the original soundtrack. It consisted of live arrangements of several of the game's songs, composed and arranged by Noriko Matsueda and Takahito Eguchi. A set of three singles entitled Final Fantasy X-2 Vocal Collection- Paine, Rikku, and Yuna was published by Avex in 2003, with each single including vocal arrangements of songs from the game, sung by the respective character's voice actress.

The soundtrack received mixed reviews from critics; while several felt that the music was good and keeping in tone with the game, others found it to be odd and shallow. Several reviewers attributed the change to the lack of participation by Uematsu. Final Fantasy X-2 International + Last Mission Original Soundtrack and Final Fantasy X-2 Piano Collection, on the other hand, were very well received by critics, who felt that they were far superior to the original soundtrack. The singles for the soundtrack were poorly received by critics, who found a few of the songs to be enjoyable but all of the singles to be overpriced.

== Concept and creation ==
Final Fantasy X-2 marks the first soundtrack where former Square composer Nobuo Uematsu did not contribute a single piece, despite having composed around half of the soundtrack for the predecessor, Final Fantasy X, as he was already busy with other projects. None of the pieces from the FFX soundtrack were re-used in X-2. Noriko Matsueda and Takahito Eguchi were brought on board to compose the music for the game, as the developers felt they were the "perfect fit" to incorporate a "pop" style into the music. The game includes two songs with vocalized elements, one of which, the J-Pop song "Real Emotion", was written by Ken Kato and composed by Kazuhiro Hara. The other, J-Pop ballad "1000 Words", was written by scenario writers Kazushige Nojima and Daisuke Watanabe. Matsueda and Eguchi composed and arranged the track. Both songs were sung by Jade Villalon from Sweetbox in the English version of the game, and are available as bonus tracks on the Japanese release of her album Adagio. In the Japanese version of the game both the songs were sung by Koda Kumi, and were released as a single entitled real Emotion/1000 no Kotoba. Kumi also released her own English versions of the songs on her CD single Come with Me, with slightly different versions of the lyrics than Jade.

== Albums ==
=== Final Fantasy X-2 Original Soundtrack ===
Final Fantasy X-2 Original Soundtrack

Studio album by Noriko Matsueda, Takahito Eguchi
- Released: March 31, 2003
- Length: Disk 1: 66:30; Disk 2: 72:06
- Label: Avex
- Producer: Noriko Matsueda, Takahito Eguchi

Final Fantasy X-2 Original Soundtrack is a soundtrack album of music from Final Fantasy X-2 composed, arranged and produced by Noriko Matsueda and Takahito Eguchi. The album spans two discs and 61 tracks, covering a duration of 2:18:00. It was released on March 31, 2003, in Japan by Avex bearing the catalog number AVCD-17254. It included a booklet filled with printed images, providing more information about the soundtrack.

Final Fantasy X-2 Original Soundtrack sold 82,000 copies as of January 2010; it reached position #5 on the Japanese Oricon charts and remained on the charts for 12 weeks. The game's soundtrack was met with mixed feelings from critics, because Final Fantasy X-2's score was the first in the series without input from Nobuo Uematsu, composer of all previous games in the main series, and because of the change to a distinct J-pop atmosphere. While IGN commented that the music provided an "appropriately fitting backdrop" and 1UP.com suggested that it "certainly is in keeping with the new flavor", others, such as Electronic Gaming Monthly, regarded it as "too bubbly". One staff member at RPGamer suggested that "the absence of Uematsu proves deafening" and "the soundtrack that accompanies this nonsensical adventure manages to encapsulate the shallow nature of the game perfectly". Ben Schweitzer of RPGFan found that the Final Fantasy X-2 Original Soundtrack album was unique and enjoyable, but "ultimately forgettable". Liz Maas of RPGFan agreed, finding the album to be simultaneously "refreshing" and "odd". Chris Heit of Soundtrack Central, however, found that the album had "good, original music", although altogether different than previous Final Fantasy soundtracks.

Track list

Disc 1
No.	Title	Japanese title	Length
1.	"Kuon: Memories of Waves and Light"	久遠 ~光と波の記憶~	2:38
2.	"Real Emotion (FFX-2 Mix)"	real Emotion (FF X-2 Mix)	2:33
3.	"YuRiPa, Fight! No. 1"	ユリパ ファイト No.1	1:30
4.	"Yuna's Theme"	ユウナのテーマ	2:52
5.	"YuRiPa, Fight! No. 2"	ユリパ ファイト No.2	2:00
6.	"Mission Complete"	ミッションコンプリート	1:37
7.	"We're the Gullwings!"	スフィアハンター・カモメ団	2:48
8.	"Mission Start!"	ミッションスタート	2:55
9.	"Mt. Gagazet"	ガガゼト山	3:38
10.	"YuRiPa, Fight! No. 3"	ユリパ ファイト No.3	1:46
11.	"Game Over"	ゲームオーバー	0:17
12.	"Anything Goes for Leblanc!"	ルプラン様はなんでもアリ!	1:45
13.	"Let Me Blow You A Kiss"	お熱いのをくれてやるよ	2:08
14.	"Shuyin's Theme"	シューインのテーマ	3:41
15.	"Besaid"	ビサイド	2:48
16.	"Kilika"	キーリカ	2:17
17.	"Luca"	ルカ	1:45
18.	"Mi'ihen Highroad"	ミヘン街道	2:18
19.	"Mushroom Rock Road"	キノコ岩街道	1:55
20.	"The Youth League"	青年同盟	2:38
21.	"The Machina Faction"	マキナ派	1:56
22.	"Guadosalam"	グアドサラム	1:43
23.	"The Thunder Plains"	雷平原	1:16
24.	"Macalania Woods"	マカラーニャの森	2:56
25.	"Bikanel Desert"	ビーカネル砂漠	1:53
26.	"New Yevon"	新エボン党	1:37
27.	"The Calm Lands"	ナギ平原	1:52
28.	"Zanarkand Ruins"	ザナルカンド遺跡	2:32
29.	"Sphere Hunters"	スフィアハンター	1:54
30.	"The Temples"	寺院	1:14
31.	"Discord"	緊迫	1:47

Disc 2
No.	Title	Japanese title	Length
1.	"The Gullwings March"	カモメ団マーチ	2:32
2.	"The Colossus"	大いなる存在	1:32
3.	"Sleep Tight"	おやすみ	0:17
4.	"Disquiet"	不安	2:11
5.	"Three Mice in Chateau Leblanc"	潜入! ルプランのアジト	1:43
6.	"Rikku's Theme"	リュックのテーマ	2:09
7.	"Chocobo"	チョコボ	1:49
8.	"Paine's Theme"	パインのテーマ	2:40
9.	"Bevelle's Secret"	ベベルの秘密	1:14
10.	"The Bevelle Underground"	アンダーベベル	2:01
11.	"Yuna's Ballad"	ユウナのバラード	3:01
12.	"Your Friendly Neighborhood Gullwings"	お助け屋カモメ団	2:21
13.	"Joost leave it tae us!"	オラたちのデバンだなや	2:59
14.	"Labyrinth"	迷宮	1:43
15.	"Turmoil"	混乱	1:42
16.	"Aeons"	召喚獣	1:07
17.	"The Farplane Abyss"	異界の深淵	2:23
18.	"Kuon – The Troupe Performs"	久遠 ~楽団員さんの演奏~	3:34
19.	"1000 Words (FFX-2 Mix)"	1000の言葉 (FF X-2 Mix)	3:54
20.	"Nightmare in the Den"	洞窟の悪夢	1:20
21.	"The Crimson Squad"	アカギ隊	3:05
22.	"Vegnagun Awakens"	ヴェグナガン起動	2:31
23.	"Crash"	激突	1:35
24.	"Clash"	死闘	1:23
25.	"Ruin"	破滅	2:59
26.	"Their Resting Place"	終焉	2:33
27.	"1000 Words (Piano Version) – A Wish That Spans the Ages"	1000の言葉 Piano Version ~時を越えた想い~	3:45
28.	"Ending – Until We Meet Again!"	エンディング ~また会う日まで~	2:11
29.	"1000 Words (Orchestra Version)"	1000の言葉 Orchestra Version	6:30
30.	"Epilogue – A Reunion!"	エピローグ ~再会~	3:26

=== Final Fantasy X-2 International + Last Mission Original Soundtrack ===
Final Fantasy X-2 International + Last Mission Original Soundtrack is a soundtrack album of music from Final Fantasy X-2 International + Last Mission composed, arranged and produced by Noriko Matsueda, Takahito Eguchi and Kazuhiro Hara. The album spans 10 tracks, covering a duration of 45:21. It includes the English versions of "real Emotion" and "1000 Words", performed by Jade Villalon of Sweetbox, as well as the eight tracks added for the International version of Final Fantasy X-2, released in Japan on February 19, 2004. The album was released on July 16, 2003, in Japan by Avex bearing the catalog number AVCD-17388.

The album was better received than the original soundtrack, with Patrick Gann finding several of the tracks to be "beautiful" and the album as a whole "a sure step up from the X-2 OST". Chris of Square Enix Music Online had similar feelings for the album, terming it a "high-quality and surprising effort" and "an incredible improvement" over the original soundtrack. The album reached #42 on the Oricon charts and remained on the charts for four weeks, selling over 9,800 copies.

Track list
No.	Title	Japanese title	Length
1.	"real Emotion (FFX-2 Mix)"	real Emotion (FFX-2 Mix)	2:34
2.	"1000 Words (FFX-2 Mix)"	1000 Words (FFX-2 Mix)	3:55
3.	"Wind Crest (The Three Trails)"	風紋 ~3つの軌跡~	2:27
4.	"Last Mission No. 1"	ラストミッション No. 1	5:26
5.	"Last Mission No. 2"	ラストミッション No. 2	5:48
6.	"Last Mission No. 3"	ラストミッション No. 3	4:30
7.	"Creature Creator"	クリーチャークリエイト	3:45
8.	"Flash Over"	フラッシュオーバー	5:24
9.	"1000 Words (Orchestra version)"	1000 Words (Orchestra version)	6:27
10.	"Kimi e"	君へ。	5:00

=== Final Fantasy X-2 Piano Collection ===
Final Fantasy X-2 Piano Collection is a collection of music from the game's soundtrack composed by Noriko Matsueda and Takahito Eguchi and arranged for the piano. The tracks were arranged by Noriko Matsueda, Takahito Eguchi, Hiroko Kokubu, Masahiro Sayama, and Febian Reza Pane. Matsueda and Eguchi's tracks were performed by Shinko Ogata, while the other arrangers performed their own works. The album spans 12 tracks and covers a duration of 47:38. It was released on March 31, 2004, by Avex with catalog number AVCD-17444.

The album was very well received, with Patrick Gann claiming that it "shines as a light in the darkness" compared to the original soundtrack and that he was "extremely pleased" with the album. Chris from Square Enix Music Online agreed, calling the album "nothing short of fantastic" and saying that the pianists did "a flawless job executing each arrangement". Jillian of Square Enix Music Online agreed, finding it to be the best Final Fantasy piano arrangement album to date.

Track list
No.	Title	Music	Japanese title	Length
1.	"Wind Crest (The Three Trails)"	Noriko Matsueda & Takahito Eguchi	風紋 ～3つの軌跡～	3:06
2.	"Yuna's Ballad"	Hiroko Kokubu	ユウナのバラード	5:41
3.	"Paine's Theme"	Masahiro Sayama	パインのテーマ	3:02
4.	"Creature Creator"	Masahiro Sayama	クリーチャークリエイト	3:58
5.	"The Calm Lands"	Hiroko Kokubu	ナギ平原	3:38
6.	"Zanarkand Ruins"	Masahiro Sayama	ザナルカンド遺跡	3:08
7.	"The Crimson Squad"	Masahiro Sayama	アカギ隊	4:07
8.	"From "Nightmare in the Den""	Noriko Matsueda & Takahito Eguchi	「洞窟の悪夢」 より	1:10
9.	"Their Resting Place"	Febian Reza Pane	終焉	3:45
10.	"1000 Words"	Hiroko Kokubu	1000の言葉	5:44
11.	"Epilogue – A Reunion!"	Noriko Matsueda & Takahito Eguchi	エピローグ ～再会～	3:58
12.	"Kuon: Memories of Waves and Light"	Hiroko Kokubu	久遠 ～光と波の記憶～	6:21

== Singles ==
=== Real Emotion/1000 no Kotoba ===
"real Emotion/1000 no Kotoba" (real Emotion/1000の言葉, riaru Emōshon/Sen no Kotoba) is a double A-side by Koda Kumi, consisting of the songs "Real Emotion" and "1000 no Kotoba" (lit. "1000 words"), which are used as the opening and closing themes respectively of Square Enix's game Final Fantasy X-2, which was used in a cut-scene in the game as well as its ending credits.

"1000 no Kotoba" was arranged by Takahito Eguchi and Noriko Matsueda. The CD contains the two songs in addition to their instrumental versions, covering a duration of 20:02. It was published by Rhythm Zone on March 5, 2003, with the catalog number RZCD-45080.

Real Emotion/1000 Words was poorly received by critics, with Patrick Gann declaring himself to be "not too impressed". It sold 283,000 copies.

=== Kuon: Memories of Waves and Light – Music from Final Fantasy X-2 ===
Kuon: Memories of Waves and Light – Music from Final Fantasy X-2 is an arranged single consisting of the songs from the game "Kuon: Memories of Waves and Light", "Besaid", and "Yuna's Ballad", composed and arranged by Noriko Matsueda and Takahito Eguchi. The songs feature live instruments, and are the only arranged tracks released from the Final Fantasy X-2 OST to date. The album was released by Avex on March 31, 2003. It covers a duration of 9:37 and has a catalog number of AVCD-30444.

Gann was more receptive to the album than to "Real Emotion", feeling that the tracks were three of the best tracks from the soundtrack, and that the single was worth purchasing if only because it was the only release of arranged music from the game to date. However, he felt that for the length, the single was overpriced. Chris of Square Enix Music Online also felt the single was overpriced, but additionally felt that the arrangements were "unremarkable musically" and that the album as a whole was "a cheap production". Memories of Waves and Light reached #32 on the Oricon charts and stayed on the charts for eight weeks.

=== Final Fantasy X-2 Vocal Collection ===
Final Fantasy X-2 Vocal Collection was a set of three singles, each consisting of two tracks sung by the voice actress for one of the main characters of the game and two instrumental tracks. The singles, Paine, Rikku, and Yuna, were released by Avex on July 16, 2003. The songs were composed and arranged by Noriko Matsueda and Takahito Eguchi. Paine was voiced by Megumi Toyoguchi, Rikku by Marika Matsumoto, and Yuna by Mayuko Aoki. Each single was produced with an accompanying DVD which included a music video, an interview with the voice actress, and a montage of scenes from the game. Paine covered a duration of 16:19 and had a catalog number of AVCD-30485/B, Rikku had a duration of 16:09 and a catalog number of AVCD-30483/B, while Yuna covered a duration of 18:59 and had a catalog number of AVCD-30481/B.

The Final Fantasy Vocal Collection singles received mixed reviews, with Patrick Gann praising Paine as "sophisticated" and applauding the instrumentation, while also approving of Yuna, terming it "peaceful" and the best of the three. However, he also derided Rikku as "cheesy" and disliked the lyrics of one of the two tracks from Paine. Additionally, he overall found the singles to be very overpriced for the small amount of material included. Paine, Rikku and Yuna reached #30, #25, and #21 on the Oricon charts, respectively, and stayed on the charts for four, six, and seven weeks.

Track listing

Paine
No.	Title	Length
1.	"Nemuru Omoi…" (眠る想い…, "Sleeping Memories...")	3:23
2.	"Misty Eyed"	4:48
3.	"Nemuru Omoi…" (Instrumental)	3:23
4.	"Misty Eyed" (Instrumental)	4:43

Rikku
No.	Title	Length
1.	"Hadashi no Kiseki" (はだしの軌跡, "Barefoot Tracks")	3:54
2.	"Without You"	4:13
3.	"Hadashi no Kiseki" (Instrumental)	3:54
4.	"Without You" (Instrumental)	4:08

Yuna
No.	Title	Length
1.	"Kimi e" (君へ。, "To you")	5:03
2.	"Morning Glow"	4:28
3.	"Kimi e" (Instrumental)	5:03
4.	"Morning Glow" (Instrumental)	4:23

== Legacy ==
Unlike the music from the main Final Fantasy series, no songs from Final Fantasy X-2 have been played at any of the numerous Final Fantasy concerts. Selections of music from the game have appeared on Japanese remix albums, called dojin music, and on English remixing websites.
