= Masahiro Sayama =

Japanese pianist

- Born: November 26, 1953; Amagasaki, Hyōgo Prefecture, Japan
- Died: November 14, 2018 (aged 64)
- Education: Kunitachi College of Music
- Occupation: Pianist

Masahiro Sayama (佐山 雅弘, Sayama Masahiro; November 26, 1953 – November 14, 2018) was a Japanese pianist, active in jazz and video game soundtracks.

Sayama began playing piano as a child and became interested in jazz after seeing the film The Glenn Miller Story. He studied music at Kunitachi College of Music and began playing jazz professionally in the early 1970s, working with Toshiyuki Honda, Shigeharu Mukai, and Kazunori Takeda. He was a member of Shuichi Murakami's trio Ponta Box and also led his own ensembles. In 1991 he began playing with Masahiko Osaka.

Sayama also played for video game soundtracks, including Final Fantasy X-2.

Sayama died on November 14, 2018, at the age of 64.
