= Final Fantasy X-2 =

2003 video game

- North American box art depicting the main playable characters Rikku, Yuna and Paine
- Developer: Square Product Development Division 1
- Publishers: JP: Square; NA: Square Enix; PAL: Electronic Arts
- Director: Motomu Toriyama
- Producer: Yoshinori Kitase
- Designers: Takayoshi Nakazato; Takatsugu Nakazawa
- Programmers: Yukio Ishii; Masaki Kobayashi
- Artist: Shintaro Takai
- Writers: Kazushige Nojima; Daisuke Watanabe
- Composers: Noriko Matsueda; Takahito Eguchi
- Series: Final Fantasy
- Platform: PlayStation 2
- Release: JP: March 13, 2003; NA: November 18, 2003; AU: February 19, 2004; EU: February 20, 2004; International + Last Mission: JP: February 19, 2004
- Genre: Role-playing
- Mode: Single-player

Final Fantasy X-2 (Note: Japanese: ファイナルファンタジーX-2, Hepburn: Fainaru Fantajī Ten Tsū) is a 2003 role-playing video game developed and published by Square for the PlayStation 2. Unlike most Final Fantasy games, which use self-contained stories and characters, X-2 continues the story of Final Fantasy X (2001). The story follows Yuna as she searches for Tidus, the main character of the previous game, while trying to prevent political conflicts in Spira from escalating to war.

Final Fantasy X-2 was the first game in the series to feature just three player characters and an all-female main cast. The battle system incorporates Final Fantasy character classes—one of the series' signature gameplay concepts—and is one of the few entries to have multiple possible endings. The soundtrack was created by Noriko Matsueda and Takahito Eguchi in lieu of long-time Final Fantasy composer Nobuo Uematsu.

The game was positively received by critics and was commercially successful, selling over 5.4 million copies on PlayStation 2 and winning a number of awards. It was the last game to be released by Square before it merged with Enix in April 2003. The game was re-released in high-definition for the PlayStation 3 and PlayStation Vita in 2013, alongside Final Fantasy X, as Final Fantasy X/X-2 HD Remaster; this version was later released for the PlayStation 4 in 2015, Windows in 2016, and the Nintendo Switch and Xbox One in 2019. As of September 2021, the Final Fantasy X series had sold over 20.8 million units worldwide, and at the end of March 2022 had surpassed 21.1 million units sold around the world.

== Gameplay ==
Players navigate in the field by controlling the on-screen character directly. New areas are accessible by jumping or climbing.

Final Fantasy X-2 is a role-playing video game in which players take on the role of Yuna as she explores the fictional world of Spira. In contrast to its predecessor, Final Fantasy X, players may visit almost every location in Spira from an early point in the game via airship. The field-map navigation system is largely unchanged from Final Fantasy X; players navigate large, continuous three dimensional areas by controlling the on-screen character. A few upgrades have been implemented, providing the player with extended interaction with the environment through jumping, climbing, and rotating camera angles. The game's sidequests include minor tasks and quests, optional bosses and dungeons, and the most minigames of any Final Fantasy at the time of its release. These minigames include Gunner's Gauntlet (a shooter game) and Sphere Break (a math-based coin game), and a management sim based on blitzball, the fictional underwater sport from Final Fantasy X.

Unlike its predecessor, in which the player's course through the world was largely linear, Final Fantasy X-2 allows players to visit almost any location at any time. The game consists of five chapters, with each location featuring one scenario per chapter. Together, the five scenarios in one locale form a subplot of the game called an "Episode". Players are free to engage with as many or as few optional scenarios as they choose; only a few scenarios per chapter are required to advance the game's central plot and are marked on the world navigation system as "Hotspots". Both Hotspots and optional scenarios contribute to a story completion tracker and the latter may indirectly influence the main narrative. Achieving 100% completion unlocks a secret ending. When the game is finished, a New Game Plus option gives players the opportunity to replay the game with different choices, with all of the items and storyline completion percentage previously achieved intact, but all character levels are reset.

A battle with an early boss, with the characters in their default dresspheres

The combat in Final Fantasy X-2 uses an enhanced version of the Active Time Battle (ATB) system, in which characters and enemies take actions according to their speed. This implementation of ATB allows characters to interrupt enemies while they are preparing to take an action. With precise timing, it is possible to chain attacks together for greater damage. Characters may change their character class mid-battle using dresspheres and the Garment Grid. These dresspheres, based on Final Fantasy character classes, allow access to different abilities to alter the course of battle. The Garment Grid is a placard featuring a geometric shape connected by nodes. Characters have access to dresspheres placed in the nodes. Depending on the properties of the Garment Grid, changing dresspheres in battle will grant bonuses such as increased strength or added elemental effects. Characters can learn new skills for each dressphere with the use of Ability Points (AP). AP is earned by defeating enemies and by the use of items and abilities for that sphere.

== Plot ==
=== Setting and characters ===
Final Fantasy X-2 takes place two years after Final Fantasy X and is set in the fictional world of Spira, which consists of one large landmass divided into three subcontinents, surrounded by small tropical islands. It features diverse climates, ranging from the tropical Besaid and Kilika islands, to the temperate Mi'ihen region, to the frigid Macalania and Mt. Gagazet areas. Spira is distinct from the mainly European-influenced worlds found in previous Final Fantasy games, being much more closely modeled on Southeast Asia, most notably with respect to vegetation, topography, architecture, and names. Although predominantly populated by humans, Spira features a variety of races. Among them are the Al Bhed, a technologically advanced but previously disenfranchised sub-group of humans with distinctive green eyes and unique language. The Guado are less human in appearance, with elongated fingers and other arboreal features. The lion-like Ronso and the frog-like Hypello comprise the remaining sentient races. The "unsent" are the strong-willed spirits of the dead that remain in corporeal form. In Spira, the dead who are not sent to the Farplane by a summoner come to envy the living and transform into "fiends", the monsters that are encountered throughout the game. Unsent with strong attachments to the world of the living may retain their human form.

Aesthetically, the world of Spira is largely unchanged in the two years since Final Fantasy X and many locations return. There are, however, major changes in the ideology of Spira's people. Spira had been terrorized by a gargantuan monster called Sin for 1000 years, inhibiting technological advancement and trapping its people in a cycle of religious asceticism in hopes of praying Sin away. After Sin's destruction during the events of Final Fantasy X, an era of enlightenment known as "the Eternal Calm" began. Yuna, a main character of the previous game, is heralded as High Summoner for her pivotal role in this battle. The priests of the Yevon religion chose to expose the truth about the order's role in perpetuating the cycle, leaving the populace to decide for themselves how to live in a world without Sin. Advanced technology and the Al Bhed are embraced by the people, who have begun to pursue leisures such as attending musical concerts and participating in the sport of blitzball. Others have become hunters of ancient treasures, ranging from coins and machinery to arcane spheres in forgotten caves and ruins. These "sphere hunters" pursue the knowledge of ancient civilizations contained within.

In the absence of Yevon, various factions have formed. Young people were especially quick to abandon Yevon and embrace technology, while many of the older generation felt that cultural changes were happening too quickly. The most influential of the groups are the progressive Youth League led by Mevyn Nooj, the reformist New Yevon Party led by Praetor Baralai, and the Machine Faction led by Gippal which supplies weapons to both sides. By the start of the game, there are rising tensions between the Youth League and the New Yevon Party. Both groups have sought High Summoner Yuna's endorsement.

The three main playable characters of Final Fantasy X-2 are Yuna, Rikku, and Paine, members of the sphere hunter group called the Gullwings. Yuna was inspired to join after viewing a sphere recording that appeared to depict Tidus, her lost love who vanished during the ending of Final Fantasy X. Yuna and Rikku reprise their roles and, though their personalities are much the same as before, Square decided that their appearances would be heavily altered to give a greater impression of activity. Furthermore, it was decided that the pervading cultural changes occurring in Spira as they and others began trying to live positively would be reflected in the new clothing of these two characters. Paine is a new character designed for Final Fantasy X-2, to accommodate the game's intended action-adventure style revolving around a trio of female characters. Several characters from Final Fantasy X appear in the game in supporting roles, including Brother, Wakka, and Lulu. Additionally, other characters are introduced in Final Fantasy X-2, such as the faction leaders and the Leblanc Syndicate, a group of sphere hunters who serve as the Gullwings' rivals for much of the game. The game's main antagonist is Shuyin, the unsent spirit of a fallen soldier during the Machina War 1000 years ago.

=== Story ===
Two years after Sin's defeat, Yuna, Rikku, and Paine recover Yuna's stolen Garment Grid from the Leblanc Syndicate in the first of several encounters in which they vie for spheres. The game is punctuated by a narration of Yuna addressing Tidus, as though she is recounting the events of the game to him as they occur. Meanwhile, the Gullwings discover a sphere containing images of an ancient machina weapon called "Vegnagun" that was secretly buried beneath Bevelle. The weapon has enough power to threaten all of Spira. The Gullwings join forces with the Leblanc Syndicate to investigate the underground areas of the city in an attempt to destroy the machine before it can be used by either side in the upcoming conflict. Discovering a large tunnel recently dug into the floor of the weapon's chamber, they realize that Vegnagun has apparently moved to the Farplane, located deep below ground.

Disagreements between Spira's factions are exacerbated by the disappearance of their leaders, Baralai, Nooj, and Gippal. In the underground areas of Bevelle, the Gullwings discover the missing faction leaders discussing Vegnagun and learn that the machine's artificial intelligence allows it to detect hostility and respond by fleeing. Paine had once been comrades with all three men during an operation in the "Den of Woe". Two years earlier, their squad explored the cave but a vengeful spirit drove them to kill one another. The four were the only survivors. The spirit—Shuyin, a soldier from the Machina War that led to the creation of Vegnagun—possessed Nooj and later forced him to shoot his comrades. Under Bevelle, Shuyin possesses Baralai and follows Vegnagun to the Farplane. Nooj and Gippal pursue, asking Yuna to keep things under control on the surface.

Yuna falls into the Farplane and meets Shuyin, who mistakes her for a woman named Lenne, whose memories are recorded in the Songstress dressphere. One thousand years ago, Shuyin was a famous blitzball player in the high-tech metropolis of Zanarkand and Lenne's lover. Desiring to save Lenne who had been conscripted into the Machina War between Zanarkand and Bevelle, he infiltrated Bevelle to hijack their secret weapon, Vegnagun. Lenne begged him to stop and Shuyin yielded, but a group of Bevelle soldiers arrived a moment later and executed the couple. In the present, Shuyin's spirit expresses anger that the people have still not understood the pain of war and plans to use Vegnagun to destroy all of Spira in retribution. The Gullwings organize a concert to which everyone in Spira is invited, supporters of the Youth League and New Yevon alike. The Songstress dressphere displays the scene of Shuyin and Lenne's last moments to all the concertgoers, opening their eyes to the unproductive nature of their disagreements.

Although the factional fighting had ceased, Shuyin's plan proceeds. Joining forces with the Leblanc Syndicate again, the Gullwings make their way to the Farplane and find Gippal and Nooj already battling Vegnagun. Once the group destroys Vegnagun, Yuna masquerades as Lenne to convince Shuyin to let go, but Shuyin eventually sees through her and attacks. The Gullwings defeat him and Lenne's spirit appears to soothe him as they depart together. By fulfilling certain conditions, the ancient spirits known as fayth agree to restore Tidus to life and reunite him with Yuna. Players who achieve 100% completion see an additional reunion scene in Zanarkand where the pair discuss whether he is truly real or still a dream.

== Development ==
Development of Final Fantasy X-2 began in late 2001 in response to the success of Final Fantasy X, particularly fan reaction to the "Eternal Calm" video included in the Japanese version of Final Fantasy X International, which depicts Yuna's everyday life after the game. Final Fantasy X-2 was released in Japan shortly before the merger between Square and Enix. The production team initially disliked the name "X-2", but was eventually accepted since the story was a direct continuation of the previous story and thus could not be the next numbered game in the Final Fantasy series. Kazushige Nojima, the previous game's writer, was also skeptical about the creation of a sequel. He was particularly averse to the happy ending, which he felt was wrong for the story. The production team was one third the size of its predecessor. This was because the team was already familiar with the material, which allowed them to give a hand-crafted feel to the game. A significant number of character models, enemies, and location designs were reused from Final Fantasy X. Character designer Tetsuya Nomura explained that this enabled the team to create the game in one year and at half the scope Final Fantasy games are normally produced. Maya and Softimage 3D were the two main programs used to create the graphics.

Producer Yoshinori Kitase and director Motomu Toriyama explained that the objective in mind when designing Final Fantasy X-2 was to embrace the concept of change as the game's theme and establish a more upbeat atmosphere than its predecessor. Retaining the engine and locations from the original game meant that the team could spend most of their time on the gameplay systems and plot. To portray the drastic change in Spira, the developers excluded summons, redesigned towns, and included vehicles. The low-flying vehicles were added to allow the player quicker access and mobility to the areas that were already available in the previous game. Final Fantasy X-2 incorporated a number of elements from modern Japanese pop culture.

The ending of Final Fantasy X meant that the Aeon summoning system could not be used in the sequel, necessitating a new gameplay system. Because of the more optimistic setting, the designers drew inspiration from the magical girl subgenre of anime and manga to create the elaborate transformation sequences of the dressphere system. The influence of J-pop is prominent in the game's opening sequence. They also drew inspiration from Charlie's Angels. Toriyama explained that one of the goals during development was to provide a large variety of minigames, such that "if you bought FFX-2 you wouldn't need any other game". The dressphere system and a lead cast of three non-"macho" girls were intended to keep the tone of the game light and lively. Lulu was excluded from the playable cast because, in addition to being married, her presence would have given her an "older sister" role to Yuna, rather than allow Yuna to discover herself on her own. Though work on the opening song and motion capture began early in development, the opening sequence was actually the last portion of the game to be completed.

=== Music ===
Noriko Matsueda and Takahito Eguchi composed the soundtrack to Final Fantasy X-2 instead of regular series composer Nobuo Uematsu. The soundtrack included two J-pop songs: "Real Emotion" and "1000 Words". Koda Kumi performed the Japanese versions of the songs and did the motion capture for the "Real Emotion" full motion video shown in the game's opening. She also voiced Lenne in the Japanese version of the game. Jade Valerie of Sweetbox recorded the songs' English versions and released extended versions as bonus tracks for the Japanese release of the album Adagio. Koda released her own English versions of "Real Emotion" and "1000 Words" on the CD single for "Come with Me", with slightly different translations.

== Release ==
As with Final Fantasy X, Square Enix released an expanded version of the game, Final Fantasy X-2 International + Last Mission, in 2004 for the PlayStation 2. It introduces two new dresspheres, an additional "Last Mission" at a location called "Yadonoki Tower", and the option to capture and battle with numerous monsters and characters including Tidus, Auron and Seymour Guado from Final Fantasy X. This version was not released outside Japan, although the English voice track was used for the main story in this version. Due to this change, parts of the Japanese subtitles were changed or altered to fit the voice-overs. This was detailed in the strategy book for the international version. In 2005, a compilation featuring Final Fantasy X and X-2 was released in Japan as Final Fantasy X/X-2 Ultimate Box.

Several action figures, books, and soundtracks were released by Square Enix, including three Ultimania guidebooks, a series of artbooks and strategy guides published in Japan. They feature original artwork from Final Fantasy X-2, offer gameplay walkthroughs, expand upon many aspects of the game's storyline, and feature several interviews with the game's developers. There are three books in the series: Final Fantasy X-2 Ultimania, Final Fantasy X-2 Ultimania Ω, and Final Fantasy X-2: International+Last Mission Ultimania. A similar three-book series was produced for Final Fantasy X.

Gaming peripheral company Hori produced PlayStation 2 controllers modeled after the Tiny Bee guns Yuna uses in Final Fantasy X-2. These controllers were released only in Japan. They were re-released in a new silver box to coincide with the release of Final Fantasy X-2: International + Last Mission. Hori also released a vertical stand for the PlayStation 2 console, with a Final Fantasy X-2 logo that lights up in blue color when plugged in.

Final Fantasy X and X-2 were re-released in high-definition for the PlayStation 3 and PlayStation Vita in celebration of the game's 10-year anniversary. Production had started by January 2012, with Kitase involved. Both games are based on the expanded editions previously only released in Japan. The collection on PlayStation 3 was titled Final Fantasy X/X-2 HD Remaster. The two games were sold separately on PlayStation Vita in Japan. Outside of Japan, the Vita games were sold together as a collection. The remasters support the "cross save" feature, in which saved games from one platform may be transferred to another platform over the internet. The remaster collection was also released on the PlayStation 4 in 2015, PCs in 2016, followed by Nintendo Switch and Xbox One in 2019.

== Reception ==
=== Critical response ===
Reception

Aggregate score
| Aggregator | Score |
|---|---|
| Metacritic | 85/100 |

Review scores
| Publication | Score |
|---|---|
| 1Up.com | A |
| Edge | 7/10 |
| Electronic Gaming Monthly | A− |
| Eurogamer | 8/10 |
| Famitsu | 34/40 |
| Game Informer | 8.75/10 |
| GamePro | 4.7/5 |
| GameRevolution | B+ |
| GameSpot | 8.9/10 |
| GameSpy | 5/5 |
| GameZone | 9.6/10 |
| IGN | 9.5/10 |
| Official U.S. PlayStation Magazine | A+ |

According to review aggregator Metacritic, reviews for Final Fantasy X-2 were "generally favorable". In 2006, readers of Japanese video game magazine Famitsu ranked Final Fantasy X-2 as number 32 in a poll on the best video games of all time. The Academy of Interactive Arts & Sciences awarded the character Rikku, performed vocally by Tara Strong, with "Outstanding Achievement in Character Performance - Female" in 2004 (tying with the character Niobe for Enter the Matrix, performed vocally by Jada Pinkett Smith); it also received nominations for "Console Role-Playing Game of the Year" and "Outstanding Achievement in Art Direction". Despite largely positive reviews from the video games press, Destructoid observed a significant backlash among fans against the game.

IGN summarized Final Fantasy X-2 as "a brilliant and addictive romp" through the world of Spira. GameSpot remarked that it was as endearing and poignant as its forebears, with strengths that outweighed any of its flaws. RPGamer regarded the battle system as innovative and "very simple to navigate". While GameSpot praised the battle system as a "welcome addition", the reviewer disliked the increased inclusion of minigames. GameSpy, while initially unsure about the new system, praised it as a solid alternative with unexpected depth.

Critics had mixed reactions to Final Fantasy X-2's tonal shift from its predecessor. IGN felt the changes were part of its intrigue, praising the narrative's political elements and comedic tone compared to the first game. The reviewer also praised the character writing and gameplay changes. Further praise came from RPGamer, with one staff reviewer summarizing it as "a light-hearted fun game" that "may ... be the most enjoyable thing to come from the series in several years". By contrast, GameSpot commented that some of the missions came off as too frivolous, and that its non-linear nature made the narrative unfocused compared to its predecessor.

The soundtrack was met with mixed reception, due to a lack of input from Uematsu and its shift to a J-pop style. Whereas IGN and 1Up.com commended the music as a fitting backdrop to the action and new tone, Electronic Gaming Monthly regarded it as "too bubbly". RPGamer suggested that "the absence of Uematsu proves deafening", but noted that its lighter atmosphere matched the tone and events of the game. The game's reuse of graphical designs from Final Fantasy X was the subject of criticism. RPGamer and GameSpot commented that, despite the lack of overt improvement on the first game, it was still one of the best-looking PlayStation 2 games at the time. Electronic Gaming Monthly regarded this reuse of code as "[tripping up] in the one area where Final Fantasy titles usually shine". GameSpy shared this view. RPGamer also criticized the multiple outfits as too revealing and aimed more at attracting male gamers than being true to the characters.

=== Sales ===
In 2003, Final Fantasy X-2 sold over 1.94 million copies in Japan, making it the highest-selling game of the year. Within nine months of its Japanese release, it sold more than a million copies in North America (within two months of its release there), and nearly four million copies worldwide. It went on to sell 2.11 million units in Japan, 1.85 million units in the United States, and more than 100,000 units in the United Kingdom. International + Last Mission sold over 288,000 copies in Japan over the course of 2004. As of March 2013, the game has sold over 5.4 million copies worldwide on PlayStation 2. By October 2013, Final Fantasy X and its sequel X-2 had together sold over 14 million copies worldwide on PlayStation 2.

=== Legacy ===
After Final Fantasy X-2, Square Enix released direct sequels to other Final Fantasy games, including Dirge of Cerberus: Final Fantasy VII, Final Fantasy IV: The After Years, and two sequels to Final Fantasy XIII. Joseph Leray of Destructoid attributed the fan backlash against the game to its status as the first direct sequel in the series and its light-hearted and "girly" tone. Reflecting on the game's legacy, Dale Bashir of IGN declared it the best among Final Fantasy sequels, citing its innovations in non-linear and episodic storytelling. Fritz Fraundorf of the GIA likewise praised its open-ended nature, observing that it was the first Final Fantasy game released in the wake of Grand Theft Auto III's popularity. He felt that it was a worthy companion to Final Fantasy X, with complementary themes, structure, and characterization. Katharine Castle of Rock, Paper, Shotgun appreciated the game for serving as the "happy ending" to Yuna's story, a sentiment echoed by Mike Fahey of Kotaku, who also commended its ability not to take itself seriously.
