= Rhythm Thief & the Emperor's Treasure =

2012 video game

Rhythm Thief & the Emperor’s Treasure
- European box art
- Developers: Sega; Xeen
- Publisher: Sega
- Directors: Shun Nakamura; Sayaka Yamato
- Producers: Shun Nakamura; Kazuhiro Kawakami
- Designers: Takashi Hirai; Daisuke Shimizu
- Artist: Toshiyuki Yonekura
- Writer: Makoto Goya
- Composers: Tomoya Ohtani; Naofumi Hataya; Takahito Eguchi
- Platforms: Nintendo 3DS, iOS
- Release: Emperor's Treasure: JP: January 19, 2012; EU: April 5, 2012; AU: April 12, 2012; NA: July 10, 2012; Paris Caper: JP: October 30, 2013; WW: January 9, 2014
- Genres: Rhythm, puzzle, adventure
- Modes: Single-player, multiplayer

Rhythm Thief & the Emperor's Treasure (Note: Known in Japan as Rhythm Kaitō R: Kōtei Napoleon no Isan (リズム怪盗R 皇帝ナポレオンの遺産, Rizumu Kaitō R: Kōtei Naporeon no Isan; lit. "Rhythm Thief R: Emperor Napoleon's Legacy").) is a rhythm-puzzle video game developed by Sega and Xeen and published by Sega for the Nintendo 3DS. It was released worldwide in 2012. An abridged port for iOS devices, titled Rhythm Thief & the Paris Caper, (Note: Known in Japan as Rhythm Kaitō R: Premium Live (リズム怪盗R プリミアムライブ, Rizumu Kaito R: Purimiamu Raibu; lit. "Rhythm Thief R: Premium Live").) was released in Japan in October 2013 and worldwide in January 2014.

== Plot ==
In the game's prologue, the casket of former French emperor Napoleon Bonaparte is mysteriously stolen from Les Invalides in the city of Paris, and as a result, Napoleon is resurrected. Three years later, in present day, an 18-year-old boy named Raphael is leading a double life as an art thief named Phantom R, searching for the whereabouts of his father who disappeared around the same time Napoleon's casket was stolen. Phantom R steals works of art and returns them a few days later for reasons unknown to the public.

After stealing a bracelet from the Louvre that bears the same symbol as a coin left behind by his father, Raphael encounters a girl named Marie who possesses a violin bearing the same symbol. However, she is being chased by a man claiming to be Napoleon, who demands an item known as the 'Dragon Crown.' Phantom R saves Marie and they visit Notre Dame where they recover the Dragon Crown for themselves. Phantom R also meets Jean-François, who is Marie's guardian at her convent. Phantom R visits Napoleon's underground hideout where he learns of someone working for Napoleon referred to as 'Graf' who Phantom R believes is his father. To further find clues about his father, and Napoleon, Phantom R visits the Paris Opera and steals the 'Queen's Pendant' from Duchess Elisabeth. Marie also visits the opera, as Jean-François believes that Elisabeth is her mother. However, Elisabeth promptly denies this, and Marie runs off crying. Phantom R narrowly dodges arrest and takes Marie back to his flat where he reveals the true reason behind his acts of theft. His father, Isaac, was a forger and Phantom R was returning the true paintings hidden in his apartment.

Marie is invited to perform in the orchestra during an event in Versailles, and Phantom R takes the chance to investigate. However, Marie is kidnapped by Napoleon. Napoleon offers to exchange Marie for the Dragon Crown. Phantom R accepts the deal and visits the Eiffel Tower along with help from his nemesis' daughter, Charlie. On the platform on the tower, Phantom R meets with Napoleon and Marie. Phantom R gives Napoleon a fake sabotaged Dragon Crown which releases gas obscuring Napoleon's view, and runs off with Marie. However, Jean-François prevents their escape from the tower by firing upon Phantom R with a handgun. Marie is taken back by Napoleon's troops and Jean-François removes the true Dragon Crown from Phantom R. Jean-François then reveals that Marie is the true key and that he was the one known as 'Graf.' Phantom R narrowly escapes being fatally shot as Charlie swoops down in a hang glider and flies off with Phantom R.

After a crash landing, Phantom R makes his way across Paris to put a stop to Napoleon's plans. Napoleon threatens Marie with the life of her mother (who turns out to be Duchess Elisabeth) and forces her to play her violin. As she finishes the song, the Hanging Gardens of Babylon emerge from the ground and float over the city. Napoleon declares them his "greatest possession, most powerful of all weapons." The Gardens create a huge storm that begins to destroy the city.

Phantom R climbs the Eiffel Tower and boards the hanging gardens along with the Paris police force, who arrest Jean-François. He enters the heart of the Gardens and has a sword fight with Napoleon, in which he emerges victorious. This brings Napoleon to his knees, who then explains his plot. He admits his true name is Leonard Bonar and that he is merely standing in place while the true emperor's body is restored. Their plan was to destroy Paris and allow Napoleon to rebuild it under his rule. Bonar believes they have triumphed, and allows himself to fall to his death in the Gardens feeling his work is done.

With Bonar gone, Phantom R attempts to shut down the Hanging Gardens to no avail. However, with encouragement from Marie and her violin, along with the willpower and the rhythm of the citizens of Paris, he destroys the Gardens' source of power, causing it to crumble and fall apart. Phantom R and Marie barely escape, only surviving thanks to a last-minute save from Charlie. Paris is safe again, and the Paris Constabulary chooses to have all events regarding Bonar and the Hanging Gardens swept under the rug.

The next day, Raphael prepares to celebrate Fête de Paris, which had been pushed back a day due to the previous events. He goes to speak with Duchess Elisabeth to wrap up some loose ends about Marie, before reuniting with Marie herself. They share one final dance during the celebration before parting ways, with Raphael continuing the search for his father, and Marie pursuing the path of a professional violinist.

A post-credits scene reveals the real Napoleon Bonaparte on the Eiffel Tower with Raphael's father, who mentions that Bonaparte's body is still yet to be fully restored. He asks permission to proceed with the next phase of their plan. Napoleon says nothing before leaving, and Raphael's father gives a silent warning to his son.

== Gameplay ==

The game's main action takes place in the Story Mode, where players follow Raphael as he investigates the mystery surrounding his father's disappearance and the resurrection of Napoleon. Throughout the story, players navigate various areas across Paris, conversing with non-player characters and solving puzzles to progress through the story. By touching various areas on the touchscreen, players can find medals, people to talk to, and hidden music scores. Certain areas also record sounds, which can be used to solve puzzles or construct the Master Instrument. Careful exploration by the player can reveal hidden rhythm games and story branches. Medals earned from rhythm games and found in areas can be spent in a shop to unlock additional minigames and movie clips.

During the story, players encounter a series of rhythm games controlled by the Nintendo 3DS's touch screen, face buttons, or gyroscopic controls. Types of levels featured include swiping the stylus to match up with other dancers, tapping the touchscreen to hide behind statues, pressing buttons to fight off groups of enemies, and tilting the console to dodge attacks. The game also features tributes to past Sega rhythm games such as Space Channel 5 and Samba de Amigo. Additional medals can be earned depending on the rank players receive. The game also features wireless multiplayer for up to two players to compete for the highest score and StreetPass functionality where players can challenge others to beat a high score.

== Development ==
Rhythm Thief & the Emperor's Treasure was announced by Sega on August 30, 2011. In the Japanese version, the opening theme is "Clair de Lune" (クレアデルネ, Kurea de Rune) by Miwa while the ending theme is "Story" by Ai. In the Western version, due to licensing issues, the ending theme is "Je te dis au revoir" (I say goodbye) by Kahimi Karie. The soundtrack was released on February 15, 2012. Also for the Western release, the sounds of gunshots in cutscenes are muted out to retain the lower "E10+" rating. In June 2012, the game's director, Shun Nakamura, stated that he was interested in making a sequel for the Nintendo 3DS or Wii U. Neither never materialized for these respective ports.

A spin-off of the game, titled Rhythm Kaitou R Premium Live, was released in Japan on October 30, 2013, for the iPhone and iPad. It adds new social elements and music not present in the original 3DS version. An English version of Premium Live was planned for release in early 2014 under the title Rhythm Thief & the Paris Caper. Whilst initially planned as a free app with additional paid content, the game was released on January 9, 2014, as a priced title. On January 10, 2014, the game was pulled from the App Store due to bugs, although it returned shortly after.

== Reception ==
Reception

Aggregate score
Aggregator	Score	
Aggregator	3DS	iOS
Metacritic	76/100	68/100

Review scores
Publication	Score	
Publication	3DS	iOS
1Up.com	B	N/A
Destructoid	7/10	N/A
Edge	N/A	5/10
Electronic Gaming Monthly	7.5/10	N/A
Eurogamer	8/10	N/A
Famitsu	32/40	N/A
Game Informer	7.5/10	N/A
GameSpot	8/10	N/A
Gamezebo	N/A	3/5
IGN	8/10	N/A
Joystiq	4/5	N/A
Nintendo Power	8/10	N/A
Pocket Gamer	4/5	4/5
The Telegraph	4/5	N/A
TouchArcade	N/A	4.5/5
Digital Spy	3/5	N/A
Metro	8/10	5/10

Rhythm Thief & the Emperor's Treasure received "generally favorable reviews", while The Paris Caper received "average" reviews, according to the review aggregation website Metacritic. Famitsu gave the 3DS version 32 out of 40 with four reviews of eight out of ten. IGN praised its delightful tunes and gameplay, although criticizing the inclusion of gyroscope controls. GameSpot called it "an enchanting rhythm adventure that really brings the funk." Official Nintendo Magazine called it "a brilliant adventure whose shortness is its only drawback." Eurogamer called it "stylish, personable and effortlessly idiosyncratic."

GameZone gave the 3DS version 9.5 out of 10, saying, "Rhythm Thief & the Emperor's Treasure was the 3DS game I never knew I absolutely needed. It does a superb job at marrying entertaining rhythm segments with great storytelling and gorgeous animations. Rhythm Thief needs to be in your collection. Here's to hoping for more Rhythm Thief games in the future." The Daily Telegraph gave the same 3DS version four stars out of five and stated, "There's perhaps a little too much repetition of particular rhythm tasks --and some are certainly more successful than others-- but Rhythm Thief is a joy from start to finish. And with a huge amount of collectibles and post-game content, provides a package that should form part of any 3DS owners [sic] library." However, Digital Spy gave it three stars out of five, saying that it "features some excellent rhythm action gameplay, a well-executed narrative and an interesting array of colourful characters. While there are some pacing issues, particularly during exploration, and the odd mini-game that isn't quite up to scratch, this is largely a very successful marriage of music and adventure. If they ever made Professor Layton: The Musical, Rhythm Thief & The Emperor's Treasure is what you'd be left with, a charming game perfectly suited to the portable." Jose Otero of 1Up.com gave the 3DS version a B, praising the game by saying: "In the end, Rhythm Thief is a fun and memorable first effort by Sega to revitalize character-driven music games, and its memorable soundtrack will leave you humming some of its quirky tunes for days after you've put the game down. If you can look past some of its simplified puzzle game premise, Rhythm Thief has plenty of fun moments to offer." David Jenkins of Metro gave The Emperor's Treasure eight out of ten and stated, "Professor Layton may offer a more cerebral challenge but Rhythm Thief has more than enough charm and imagination to waltz its way into your affections." However, Roger Hargreaves of the same website gave The Paris Caper five out of ten, saying, "The original 3DS game is sacrificed on the altar of microtransactions and grubby monetisation, almost erasing any sense of fun in the process."
