= Bahamut Lagoon =

1996 video game

- Developer: Square
- Publisher: Square
- Director: Kazushige Nojima
- Producer: Tadashi Nomura
- Designer: Hitoshi Sasaki
- Programmer: Hiroshi Ono
- Artist: Hitoshi Sasaki
- Writer: Motomu Toriyama
- Composer: Noriko Matsueda
- Platform: Super Famicom
- Release: JP: February 9, 1996
- Genre: Tactical role-playing
- Mode: Single-player

Bahamut Lagoon (Note: Japanese: バハムート ラグーン, Hepburn: Bahamūto Ragūn) is a 1996 tactical role-playing game developed and published by Square for the Super Famicom. Bahamut Lagoon was released on the Virtual Console in Japan on September 29, 2009 for the Wii and on February 5, 2014 for the Wii U.

== Gameplay ==
Bahamut Lagoon is a tactical role-playing game in which players take on the role of Byuu, a soldier of the kingdom of Kahna who leads a campaign against Granbelos Empire across the floating lands of Orelus. The gameplay blends 2D RPG grid-based combat with turn-based combat. Players have the ability to raise and battle dragons to fight alongside a player's other characters. A player has a squadron of four characters in combat, and players have six different squadron leaders they can choose from. Each squad leader has a dragon which can be evolved into different types by feeding it weapons, armor, accessories, and items. Feeding dragons foods they like will increase their loyalty, and food they don't like will decrease loyalty, but players can still use foods dragons do not like to make a dragon more powerful. Dragons are not controlled by the player, but are given general guidelines such as "Go!" or "Wait!".

== Plot ==
In the world of Orelus, continents called "lagoons" float in the sky, and war is threatened when the kingdom of Kahna is invaded by the Granbelos Empire. This leads Captain Byuu of the Dragon Squad to fight to repel this invasion, but after the initial victory, Kahna is overrun, and Byuu, the game's silent protagonist, leads a continued campaign against the Granbelos Empire.

== Development ==
The concept for Bahamut Lagoon was created by Hitoshi Sasaki, known for his graphic design work on Final Fantasy VI, with him describing it as a game he had wanted to make for a long time. Programmer Hiroshi Ono approached Hironobu Sakaguchi with the proposal of a team of new Square developers creating their own project. Beginning development around the concept of a traditional RPG with random encounters, it shifted to its current tactical design. Sakaguchi, who was a fan of the tactical RPG genre, approved the project; it was originally titled "Final Fantasy Tactics". Production began in 1994 at Square's Development Department 6 and lasted for two years. Sasaki acted as lead designer and lead artist. The game was directed by Kazushige Nojima, who joined the company in 1994 from Data East after working as writer for the Glory of Heracles series. The producer was Tadashi Nomura. The scenario was written by Motomu Toriyama, who also joined in 1994 and took up the role as no-one had.

The game's setting was inspired by Sasaki's memory of flying over the Izu Peninsula, wanting to evoke a similar feeling of a "floating lagoon". The scenario, which featured complex relationships and betrayals, was directly influenced by events in Toriyama's life. Toriyama attributed his leading role in the scenario to the team's nature as a group of newcomers. The battle system was designed by Takatsuga Nakazawa, who wanted to make the game challenging yet balanced for players, with Sasaki calling Nakazawa "brutal" with some of his trap placements. Dragon breeding was implemented during the later half of development, which influenced its design transition into a tactical RPG. Ono wanted the dragons to exist as their own creatures outside player control, hence being driven by the game's AI. An abandoned idea was dragons fighting and eating each other during battles. Sasaki also wanted the dragons not to act like party members, comparing them to pets that acted on their own. Space limitations forced a reduction in the planned character behaviour pattern.

=== Music ===
The music was composed and arranged by Noriko Matsueda. Teruaki Sugawara acted as sound engineer, and the sound programmer was Hidenori Suzuki. Bahamut Lagoon was Matsueda's second major video game, having first co-composed the score of Front Mission with Yoko Shimomura. Matsueda wanted to create a score close to orchestral music, working within the platform's limited sound environment to create that impression through "reverb, spatiality, and balance". She also wanted music that would get players emotionally invested in the narrative, thinking of that before matching songs to in-game areas. An official soundtrack album was published by NTT Publishing on February 25, 1996.

== Release ==
Bahamut Lagoon was released for the Super Famicom on February 9, 1996. It was one of Square's last Super Famicom releases before they broke with Nintendo to develop for Sony's PlayStation. As with other of Square's Super Famicom titles of the time, copies were priced high due to the growing expense of cartridge production. It was re-released in the Japanese Virtual Console for Wii on September 29, 2009, and for Wii U on February 5, 2014. The Wii version was taken down with the console's Virtual Console store in 2019.

The game has never been officially released outside Japan. A fan translation patch was created by a three-person team including Clyde Mandelin and released in 2002, noted as sharing many issues of translations of that era. A second notably-polished fan translation was created by Near, known for their work on Super Famicom emulators who had been working on and off on the project for over twenty years. The translation was released in 2021. The updated Bahamut Lagoon translation was the last project completed by Near before their suicide in June of that year following an online harassment campaign.

== Reception ==
Reception

Review scores
Publication	Score
Edge	9/10
Famitsu	8/10, 6/10, 7/10, 8/10
Jeuxvideo.com	18/20
RPGamer	8/10

During 1996, Bahamut Lagoon sold over 474,600 copies, making it the 17th best-selling game of the year and Square's third best-selling title after Super Mario RPG and Tobal No. 1. VideoGames, as part of a feature on upcoming RPGs, described the game as looking "phenomenal", highlighting its graphics and gameplay design.

The narrative saw mixed reactions. Edge praised the narrative as moving away from its initial premise, and lauding the cast as a blending of strengths between Chrono Trigger and Final Fantasy VI. French website Jeuxvideo.com noted that the storyline evolved beyond its opening tropes due to how the characters acted and the plot secrets revealed during the last chapters. RPGamer's Seán Michael Peters noted the use of multiple overused genre tropes, but also praised the story twists and character evolution. Nick Rox of GameFan did not mention the story, but was dismissive of the premise.

The graphics and music were generally praised. Edge described the graphics and sprite work as some of the best on the system. Jeuxvideo.com gave praise to the graphics and highlighted the constant use of filters and effects, but faulted a lack of variety in the soundtrack. Peters praised the graphics despite not matching other Super Famicom titles such as Star Ocean, and generally enjoyed the music despite some repetition. Rox called the visuals and effects "excellent" despite finding them lacking compared to some earlier Square titles on the platform and positively noting the added character movement graphics, additionally praising Matsueda's score.

The gameplay also met with praise from Western reviewers. Speaking about the gameplay, Edge lauded the amount of customization options given to the player and the depth of combat, comparing it favorably to later RPGs. Jeuxvideo.com positively noted the gameplay depth and gave extensive commentary and praise to the dragon raising and commanding mechanics. Peters enjoyed the gameplay mechanics, but described the difficulty as unexpectedly high. Rox was mixed on the gameplay, finding it too easy, inferior to that of Front Mission and referring to the title as "basically Shining Force with dragons".

Retrospective opinions on Bahamut Lagoon have been positive. Alex Kwan of Game On USA praised its mechanics as innovative within the genre, but considered its difficulty to be fairly low. Kurt Kalata, writing for Hardcore Gaming 101 positively noted the story's focus on clashing personalities and its depth of tactical mechanics. Reviewing the Wii U Virtual Console release, Nintendo Life's Kerry Brunskill noted that it stood out from other tactical RPGs due to its blend of gameplay elements and dragon raising mechanics. Rolando Orcha of Siliconera praised its blending of tactical and standard RPG elements, hoping for its eventual appearance on other platforms and a localized release. As part of an interview with Sakaguchi, Simon Parkin of Eurogamer noted Bahamut Lagoon as one of several "fascinating curios" produced by Square during the early to mid 1990s. In an article on six Super Famicom imports, 1Up.com's Bob Mackey called it a "fantastic game" and a notable title from Square's final year with Nintendo.
