= Olympic Games Tokyo 2020 - The Official Video Game =

2019 video game

- Developer: Sega (Note: Additional work by Yuke's.)
- Publisher: Sega
- Director: Hitoshi Furukubo
- Producer: Nobuya Ohashi
- Designers: Shingo Kawakami; Katsuyuki Shigihara; Masashi Jinbo
- Programmer: Motoyoshi Sato
- Artist: Takayuki Iwasaki
- Composers: Kenichi Tokoi; Jun Senoue; Tomonori Sawada
- Engine: Hedgehog Engine 2
- Platforms: Nintendo Switch; PlayStation 4; Windows; Stadia; Xbox One
- Release: Nintendo Switch, PS4: JP/AS: July 24, 2019; WW: June 22, 2021; Windows, Xbox One, Stadia: WW: June 22, 2021
- Genre: Sports
- Modes: Single-player, multiplayer

Olympic Games Tokyo 2020 - The Official Video Game is a sports video game developed and published by Sega. The game was originally released in Japan for the Nintendo Switch and PlayStation 4 on July 24, 2019. However, due to the COVID-19 pandemic delaying the start of the 2020 Summer Olympics in Tokyo, the game was not released outside of Japan and East Asia until June 2021, when it also released for Windows, Stadia, and Xbox One. The game features 80 national teams and 18 events.

Yuke's provided developmental assistance. The game is the penultimate Olympic video game to be released by Sega, as Sega's license to produce games based on the Olympic Games was discontinued after the release of Mario & Sonic at the Olympic Games Tokyo 2020 due to the International Olympic Committee pivoting to mobile games produced by nWay for the 2024 Summer Olympics.

== Events ==
The following events are in the game: four additional sports were added to the game as updates.

- Athletics
  - Track
    - 100 metres
    - 110 metres hurdles
    - 4 × 100 metres relay^{§}
  - Field
    - Long jump
    - Hammer throw
- Aquatics
  - 100 m freestyle swimming
  - 200 m Medley swimming
- Other
  - Baseball
  - Basketball
  - Beach volleyball
  - Boxing
  - Cycling, BMX racing
  - Football
  - Judo^{§}
  - Rugby sevens^{§}
  - Sport climbing^{§}
  - Table tennis (singles and doubles)
  - Tennis (singles and doubles)

^§: Later added as downloadable content.

== Playable nations ==
The game features 80 playable nations, making it the most playable nations that have ever been in an Olympics video game.

- Algeria
- Angola
- Argentina
- Australia
- Austria
- Bahamas
- Belgium
- Bolivia
- Brazil
- Bulgaria
- Canada
- Chile
- China
- Colombia
- Costa Rica
- Croatia
- Cuba
- Czech Republic
- Denmark
- Ecuador
- Egypt
- Ethiopia
- Fiji
- Finland
- France
- The Gambia
- Great Britain
- Germany
- Ghana
- Greece
- Guinea
- Honduras
- Hong Kong
- Hungary
- Indonesia
- India
- Iran
- Ireland
- Israel
- Italy
- Ivory Coast
- Jamaica
- Japan
- Kenya
- Malaysia
- Mexico
- Morocco
- Netherlands
- New Zealand
- Nigeria
- Norway
- Pakistan
- Paraguay
- Peru
- Philippines
- Poland
- Portugal
- Romania
- ROC
- Saudi Arabia
- Senegal
- Singapore
- South Africa
- Slovakia
- Slovenia
- South Korea
- Spain
- Sweden
- Switzerland
- Chinese Taipei
- Thailand
- Togo
- Trinidad and Tobago
- Tunisia
- Turkey
- United Arab Emirates
- Ukraine
- Uruguay
- United States
- Uzbekistan

== Top Athletes ==
In addition to allowing players to compete against fictional athletes, the game also allows players to compete against licensed players, referred to as "top athletes", in training mode. The top athletes serve as the hardest difficulty for each event, with the game recording, and rewarding players based on, how many times they have beaten a top athlete. There are 20 top athletes, one for each event, representing 17 national teams.

- 100 metres - Lloyd Lawrence Jamaica
- 110 metres hurdles - Amelia Ryan Australia
- Hammer throw - Karolina Przybylska Poland
- Long Jump - Bandile Dlamini South Africa
- BMX - Salomé Patiño Colombia
- 4x100 metres relay - Armandine Goethals Belgium
- 100 metres freestyle - Bastien Perec France
- 200 metres individual medley - Eva Mills Australia
- Table tennis (singles) - Qi Xintong China
- Table tennis (doubles) - Zhou Qiyun China
- Tennis (singles) - Mathias Widmer Switzerland
- Tennis (doubles) - Alicia Roca Spain
- Boxing - Craig Whitwell Great Britain
- Judo - Gezaburo Miyamoto Japan
- Baseball - Camilo Prats Cuba
- Basketball - Theresa Mosley United States
- Football - Osvaldo Moura Jr. Brazil
- Beach volleyball - Kathy Adams United States
- Rugby sevens - Samu Boseiwaqa Fiji
- Sport climbing - Ljudmila Oblak Slovenia

== Reception ==
Reception

Aggregate score
| Aggregator | Score |
|---|---|
| Metacritic | PC: 56/100; PS4: 71/100; XONE: 66/100; NS: 70/100 |

Review scores
| Publication | Score |
|---|---|
| Destructoid | 5/10 |
| Push Square | 8/10 |

The Switch version received 80% from Digitally Downloaded, who said that "one of the areas that Tokyo 2020 immediately stands out is that it has a good range of different sports represented, and they all play differently." They went on to praise the presentation and the customisation, adding that "as a single player game it's a little lonely and limited."
