= Mario & Sonic at the Olympic Games Tokyo 2020 =

2019 video game

- Cover art, depicting Mario and Sonic at the Japan National Stadium
- Developer: Sega (Note: Additional work by Racjin, Yuke's, AlphaDream and Success)
- Publisher: Sega
- Director: Naohiro Hirao
- Producer: Nobuya Ohashi
- Designers: Shingo Kawakami; Takao Hirabayashi; Mariko Kawase
- Programmer: Mitsuru Takahashi
- Artist: Hiroshi Kanazawa
- Composers: Kenichi Tokoi; Tomoya Ohtani; Mitsuharu Fukuyama; Satoshi Okamura
- Series: Mario & Sonic
- Platforms: Nintendo Switch, Arcade
- Release: Nintendo Switch: JP/AS: November 1, 2019; NA: November 5, 2019; EU: November 8, 2019; Arcade: WW: 2020
- Genre: Sports
- Modes: Single-player, multiplayer

Mario & Sonic at the Olympic Games Tokyo 2020 (Note: Japanese: マリオ&(アンド)ソニック AT(アット) 東京2020オリンピック, Hepburn: Mario ando Sonikku atto Tōkyō 2020 (Nī-Zero-Nī-Zero) Orinpikku) is a 2019 crossover sports video game developed and published by Sega for the Nintendo Switch. Based on the 2020 Summer Olympics, it is the sixth and final game in the Mario & Sonic series, a crossover between Nintendo's Super Mario and Sega's Sonic the Hedgehog franchises, and the first since the Rio 2016 Olympic Games edition. It was also released for arcade cabinets in 2020.

The game received mixed reviews, with praise for the presentation and gameplay, but criticism for a perceived lack of content for single-player, multiplayer features, and the story mode. It is the final game in the series, as the International Olympic Committee chose not to renew Sega and Nintendo's license to produce Olympic video games after 2020, in favor of a new partnership with nWay, who has developed mobile games for the subsequent editions, as well as exploring opportunities in non-fungible tokens and esports.

== Gameplay ==
8-bit Princess Peach & Luigi and 16-bit Sonic the Hedgehog & Knuckles competing in a retro version of the 400 metres hurdles at the 1964 Summer Olympics held in Tokyo, Japan

Like previous Mario & Sonic titles, Mario & Sonic at the Olympic Games Tokyo 2020 is a sports game featuring a crossover cast of characters from Nintendo's Super Mario and Sega's Sonic the Hedgehog series. The player, using one of the characters, competes in a multitude of events based on sports from the Olympic Games. The game features a variety of events; returning ones from previous Mario & Sonic titles include boxing, soccer (referred to as football in the game), swimming, and gymnastics, while new ones include karate, skateboarding, sport climbing, and surfing.

The game supports a variety of controllers, including the Joy-Con motion controllers. The game also features single system split-screen multiplayer, LAN multiplayer, and online play. An additional 2D Mode is also included, based on the 1964 Summer Olympics, and featuring 8-bit and 16-bit styles for Mario and Sonic, respectively. These 2D Mode events have more limited controls and the option to enable a CRT overlay to further emulate the feel of games of that era.

There are thirty-two playable characters in the game. Similar to the Wii U version of the previous game, the series' regulars since the second game are playable in all events while the other twelve are only playable in one event as a guest. Guest characters include Larry Koopa, Wendy O. Koopa, Ludwig von Koopa, Diddy Kong, Rosalina, Toadette (who is the game's sole newcomer), Dr. Eggman Nega, Jet the Hawk, Rouge the Bat, Zavok, Zazz, and Espio the Chameleon. In order to unlock these guest characters, players have to progress through the game's story mode.

== Development and release ==
In October 2016, Sega announced it had secured the licensing rights from the International Olympic Committee to publish video games based on the 2020 Summer Olympics, with plans for games to be released on various devices. Mario & Sonic at the Olympic Games Tokyo 2020 was announced alongside Olympic Games Tokyo 2020 - The Official Video Game on March 29, 2019, at the Sega Fes stage show in Japan. It was the first Mario & Sonic game since the Rio 2016 Olympic Games edition for the Wii U and Nintendo 3DS and was released worldwide for the Nintendo Switch in November 2019; a version for arcade cabinets was released in 2020. A companion game for Android and iOS, Sonic at the Olympic Games - Tokyo 2020, was also released in 2020. The game was featured at E3 2019, and Gamescom 2019. Mario & Sonic at the Olympic Games Tokyo 2020 was the final game AlphaDream worked on before it filed for bankruptcy in 2019. Racjin, Yuke's, and Success Corp also worked on the game; Racjin helped develop previous Mario & Sonic games, while Yuke's helped Sega develop Olympic Games Tokyo 2020 - The Official Video Game.

A tie-in free-to-start mobile game Sonic at the Olympic Games - Tokyo 2020 was released for on Android and iOS on May 7, 2020. Like its predecessor Sonic at the Olympic Winter Games, it features similar gameplay to the main game, albeit lack of Mario characters and the 2D mode, additional events, and a new story. Despite the delay of the Tokyo Olympic Games from 2020 to 2021 due to the COVID-19 pandemic, the game retained the "Olympic Games Tokyo 2020" name for branding purposes.

The game was delisted from the Nintendo eShop on March 31, 2026.

== Reception ==
Reception

Aggregate scores
Aggregator	Score
Metacritic	69/100
OpenCritic	51% recommend

Review scores
Publication	Score
4Players	77/100
Destructoid	8/10
Easy Allies	6/10
GameRevolution	3.5/5
GameSpot	7/10
Hardcore Gamer	3/5
IGN	6.4/10
Jeuxvideo.com	12/20
Nintendo Life	7/10
Nintendo World Report	8/10
Shacknews	9/10
USgamer	3/5
VideoGamer.com	7/10

Mario & Sonic at the Olympic Games Tokyo 2020 has received "mixed or average reviews" from critics according to the review aggregator website Metacritic. Fellow review aggregator OpenCritic assessed that the game received fair approval, being recommended by 51% of critics.

The game has received praise for its mini games, which have been described as fun to play. The game has also received praise for the story mode for having its own mini-games, references to various Mario and Sonic games, respectively, humor, and Olympic history. Also, the game has received praise for the 2D events for adding value for fans of the retro Mario and Sonic style, as well as emulating the feel of sports games of that era, such as Track & Field. However, the game has also received criticism for its story mode having "tedious progression" and slow dialogue. The game has also received criticism towards its lack of single-player content.

Reception to multiplayer was mixed. Local play received praise for making events more enjoyable and adding replay value, but was criticized for its limited options and "lack of formal structure". The online mode has been criticized due to lag, especially when playing with eight players, although two to four players online has been reported to be smoother, with less lag.

In Japan, it was the 28th-best-selling game of 2019, with 195,128 units sold in Japan that year. The game sold over 900,000 units as of March 2020.
