= Tomoya Ohtani =

Japanese composer and bassist (born 1974)

- 大谷 智哉
- Born: July 1, 1974 (age 51); Tokyo, Japan
- Occupations: Composer; bassist
- Years active: 1999–present
- Employer: Sega
- Musical career
- Genres: Video game music; rock; heavy metal; funk; electronic; drum and bass; synth-pop; orchestral
- Instruments: Bass guitar; keyboards; percussion

Tomoya Ohtani (大谷 智哉, Ōtani Tomoya; born July 1, 1974) is a Japanese composer and bassist. He has been involved with music since high school and produced audio for theater companies before joining the video game company Sega in 1999. He is a composer and sound director of the Sonic the Hedgehog series.

== Works ==
Year	Title	Role(s)
1999	ChuChu Rocket!	Music
2000	Roommania #203	Music with several others
2001	Sonic Adventure 2	Music with Jun Senoue, Fumie Kumatani, and Kenichi Tokoi
2002	Space Channel 5: Part 2	Music with Naofumi Hataya and Kenichi Tokoi
2003	Billy Hatcher and the Giant Egg	Music with Mariko Nanba
2003	Sonic Heroes	"Stage 11: Hang Castle"
2004	Sega Superstars	Music with Mariko Nanba and Keiichi Sugiyama
2005	Shadow the Hedgehog	"The ARK"
2006	Sega Rally 2006	"Steppin' Pedal"
2006	Sonic the Hedgehog	Lead composer
2007	Sonic Rush Adventure	Music with Seirou Okamoto and Mariko Nanba
2007	Nights: Journey of Dreams	"Clashing Cerberus"
2008	Sonic Unleashed	Lead composer
2009	Mario & Sonic at the Olympic Winter Games	Music with several others
2010	Super Monkey Ball: Step & Roll	Music with Mariko Nanba
2010	Sonic Colors	Lead composer
2011	Sonic Generations	Arrangements with several others
2011	Mario & Sonic at the London 2012 Olympic Games	Music with several others
2012	Rhythm Thief & the Emperor's Treasure	Lead composer
2013	Sonic Lost World	Lead composer
2013	Rhythm Thief & the Paris Caper	Lead composer
2014	Dengeki Bunko: Fighting Climax	Music with several others
2015	Sonic Runners	Music
2016	Mario & Sonic at the Rio 2016 Olympic Games	Music with several others
2017	Sonic Forces	Lead composer
2018	Super Smash Bros. Ultimate	Arranged "Bomb Rush Blush [Splatoon]"
2019	Team Sonic Racing	"Sky Road"
2019	Mario & Sonic at the Olympic Games Tokyo 2020	Music with several others
2020	Space Channel 5 VR: Kinda Funky News Flash	Music with several others
2020	Sonic at the Olympic Games - Tokyo 2020	Music with Hidekuni Horita, Jun Senoue, and Kenichi Tokoi
2021	Sonic Colors: Ultimate	Remixes with Jun Senoue and Kenichi Tokoi
2022	Sonic Frontiers	Lead composer
2025	Sonic Racing: CrossWorlds	Music with several others
