= Front Mission (video game) =

1995 video game

- Super Famicom cover art
- Developers: G-Craft (SNES, WSC); Studio Clips, Tom Create (WSC); Square Enix (PS1); Tose (DS); Forever Entertainment (Remake)
- Publishers: Square (SNES, WSC); Square Enix (PS1, DS); Forever Entertainment (Remake)
- Director: Toshiro Tsuchida
- Producers: Toshiro Tsuchida; Shinji Hashimoto
- Artist: Yoshitaka Amano
- Writer: Toshiro Tsuchida
- Composers: Yoko Shimomura; Noriko Matsueda
- Series: Front Mission
- Platforms: Super Famicom; WonderSwan Color; PlayStation; Nintendo DS
- Release: February 24, 1995: Super Famicom; JP: February 24, 1995 WonderSwan Color; JP: July 12, 2002 Front Mission 1st PlayStation; JP: October 23, 2003 Nintendo DS; JP: March 22, 2007; NA: October 23, 2007
- Genre: Tactical role-playing
- Modes: Single-player, multiplayer

Front Mission (Note: Japanese: フロントミッション, Hepburn: Furonto Misshon) is a tactical role-playing game developed by G-Craft and published by Square for the Super Famicom. It was originally released only in Japan on February 24, 1995. Front Mission is the first main entry and the first entry overall in the Front Mission series. Front Mission is part of a serialized storyline that follows the stories of various characters and their struggles involving mecha known as wanzers. A direct port of the game was released for the WonderSwan Color in Japan on July 12, 2002.

A remake of the game developed by Square Enix Co., Ltd. was released for the PlayStation in Japan on October 23, 2003, titled Front Mission 1st. (Note: Japanese: フロントミッション ザ・ファスト) It included new content and offered a new USN scenario to play through. Front Mission 1st was then ported to the Nintendo DS with more additional content and was released in Japan on March 22, 2007. Only the Nintendo DS port, renamed as Front Mission, was released in North America on October 23, 2007.

A further remake of Front Mission 1st, titled Front Mission 1st: Remake (Japanese: フロントミッション ザ・ファースト：リメイク), was developed and published by Forever Entertainment for the Nintendo Switch on November 30, 2022. Ports to PlayStation 4, PlayStation 5, Windows, Xbox One, and Xbox Series X/S were released on June 30, 2023.

== Gameplay ==
Game progression in Front Mission proceeds in a linear manner: watch cut-scene events, complete missions, set up wanzers during intermissions, and sortie for the next mission. The player travels to locations on a point-and-click world map. As the player progresses through the plot, new locations are revealed on the world map. Towns and cities act as intermission points where the player can organize and set up their units for the upcoming mission. Battle zones are where the missions take place, though they become inaccessible upon the completion of a mission.

Overhead view of world map during a mission

In Front Mission, players use playable units called wanzers, a term for mecha derived from the German word Wanderpanzer, or "walking tank". A wanzer differs from the typical combat unit in that it has four modular parts: body, left arm, right arm, and legs. Each part has a specific function and its own health bar. The legs parts enable movement and evasion, the arm parts are necessary to use hand and shoulder weapons, and the body part maintains the wanzer's operability. In the event the body is destroyed, the wanzer is removed from play completely. Destruction of arm and leg parts does not remove the wanzer from play, but it severely cripples its performance, either through the loss of weapon use (in the case of the arms), or by slowing the movement rate to a single space (in the case of the legs). While the player fights mostly wanzers, vehicles and aircraft, mobile weapon platforms are also featured. These enemy units generally have only one part, the body, and are much stronger than wanzers themselves.

In the customization aspect of Front Mission, wanzers can be customized with a variety of parts, computers, auxiliary backpacks, and weapons. The player has full control over customizing their wanzers and can do so as long as its total weight value does not exceed its given power output. To field a wanzer in battle, it must have a complete frame of parts: body, left arm, right arm, and legs. Parts with built-in weapons in the body or arm sections can also be equipped on a wanzer. Computers improve the accuracy of the weapons equipped on the wanzer, as well as being used to activate special abilities that can be purchased and loaded into them. Auxiliary backpacks and weapons are not mandatory equipment to use wanzers, but are crucial in order to progress through the games. Auxiliary backpacks serve to give a wanzer special features during combat; they allow a wanzer to carry support items such as ammunition reloads and increase the power output of the unit, allowing it to carry heavier gear.

There are four classes of weapons: melee weapons, short-range weapons, long-range weapons, and support fire weapons. Melee weapons are weapons used at melee range and have a tendency to strike the body part of its target. Tonfas and rods are examples of melee weapons. Short-range weapons are weapons used at close range and deal damage to all parts of a target. Machine guns and shotguns are examples of short-range weapons. Long-range weapons are weapons that have long firing ranges and are ideal for avoiding counterattacks. Bazookas are examples of long-range weapons. Support fire weapons are indirect fire weapons; they can never be counterattacked, but have limited ammunition supply and minimum firing ranges. Missile launchers are examples of support fire weapons. Lastly, shields can be equipped on wanzers to absorb some of the damage taken from incoming attacks.

Front Mission has other notable features incorporated into the game. The Arena is a unique feature in which the player can fight AI-controlled enemy combatants to earn monetary rewards. Likewise, Front Mission sports a briefing feature that details basic information about the composition of enemy forces for the upcoming mission. Missions in Front Mission are traditional tactical RPG fare, ranging from destroying all enemy targets or protecting a particular allied target.

== Synopsis ==
=== Setting ===
Set in 2090, the story of Front Mission takes place on Huffman Island, a fictional Pacific Ocean island roughly the size of Oahu, created by volcanic activity south of Mexico's west coast in 1995. In 2002, the land mass was classified as an island, and was ceded to United Nations control. However, in 2020, the United States of the New Continent (USN), a unification of North American and South American countries, made a bid for control of the island after withdrawing from the United Nations. The Oceania Cooperative Union (OCU), an alliance of the nations of South Asia, Southeast Asia, Japan, South Korea and Australia that was created in 2025, dispute this claim when the two superpowers colonized the island in 2065. The tensions heat up and eventually lead to the 1st Huffman Conflict in 2070, with Huffman Island being divided into two halves at the end of the war: the east becoming OCU territory, and the west becoming USN territory.

=== Plot ===
An OCU reconnaissance team led by Royd Clive is assigned to investigate a USN munitions factory in the Larcus district, located on eastern Huffman Island. Upon reaching the factory, the team is ambushed by USN wanzers led by officer Driscoll. He ambushes Karen Meure, Royd's fiancée, and destroys her wanzer. The two forces engage in battle, but it ends with Driscoll detonating explosives inside the plant and he escapes. The USN publicly frames the event as an enemy attack, later known as the Larcus Incident, which reignites tensions and begins the 2nd Huffman Conflict. Royd and his team are discharged and listed as killed in action.

One year later, Royd earns a living at a wanzer fighting arena, and is approached by Guri Olson. Olson, commander of the Canyon Crows mercenary group, recruits Royd into the Crows with the prospect of avenging Karen's death. The Crows initially consists of Natalie Blakewood, Keith Carabell, Joynas "JJ" Jeriaska, and Ryuji Sakata. Royd is permitted to recruit anyone else he chooses, including war journalist Frederick Lancaster, and child soldier Yang Meihua. Royd learns from Meihua and her hacker friend Hans Goldwin that Karen is possibly alive and recovering at Grey Rock Hospital, but they arrive too late as a USN truck takes the patients elsewhere, and Driscoll demolishes the hospital.

Although Hans finds a conspiratorial connection between Grey Rock Hospital and a mysterious "Nirvana Institute", with no further leads on Karen's fate the Crows collaborate with the OCU to fight the UCN, and liberate Freedom City, the capital of eastern Huffman. Having reclaimed all former OCU territory, the Crows and OCU push into western Huffman; this includes an assault on Morgan Fortress, where Driscoll is revealed to be a member of Nirvana. Driscoll deploys wanzers utilising experimental "B-device" technology, though they are defeated by the Crows, and Driscoll again escapes. The Crows also discover that Nirvana are experimenting on kidnapped soldiers, including Meihua's brother Yeehin, whom they rescue.

Whilst the OCU comes very close to winning the war outright, a peace is brokered by the Peace Mediation Organization (PMO), a group backed by the Republic of Zafra. The Crows now find themselves working for the PMO, and on neutral terms with USN soldiers. This includes Driscoll, whom Olson prohibits Royd taking vengeance on. The Crows are now tasked with eliminating the Spirit of Huffman terrorist group, led by Gentz Weizer. The Spirit of Huffman are reportedly attacking civilians, but particularly focused on attacking Sakata Industries, a wanzer manufacturer, and its president Koichi Sakata, Ryuji's brother.

During an attack on the Spirit of Huffman, the Crows discover that Frederick has already been in close contact with Spirit of Human, who disputes the group's reported attacks on civilians. Gentz claims they are solely targeting Sakata, who are actually the creators of B-device technology, revealed to be the grafting of soldiers' brains into wanzer CPUs, and that Nirvana is responsible for finding and capturing candidates with extensive combat experience. Believing his story, Royd recruits Gentz, but this causes a split in the Crows; Natalie, Keith, and JJ stay with Olson's faction, whereas the other recruits join Royd's rogue faction to pursue Nirvana and Sakata.

Returning to the Larcus munitions factory, Gentz explains it was actually Nirvana's original B-device factory, and Sakata had arranged the attack to intentionally trigger the war as a means to test and sell the technology. Driscoll appears, revealing Karen is the B-device of his wanzer, but is killed by Royd's Crows. Upon dying, Driscoll reveals the Crows were themselves assembled as B-device candidates.

Having attacked Driscoll's squad and thus threatening peace, Olson's Crows confront Royd's Crows, but Natalie takes pity on the others - having known about the Crows purpose from the beginning and betraying them to Driscoll - and join's Royd's faction. JJ and Keith do the same, leaving Olson alone. Royd's Crows hide at Rupidis, the largest port, until they are tracked down by USN/OCU soldiers led by Olson. Willas Blakewood, founder of the Crows and Natalie's father, arrives to assist Royd's faction, and informs them that Koichi is on a Sakata ship nearby. Ryuji begs his father Reiji, Sakata's founder, to stop Koichi. Reiji attempts it but Koichi is unmoved and Reiji leaves to join Ryuji, but Koichi's ship guns Reiji down. Their conversation reveals that Zafra, despite being PMO's benefactor, is also involved in Sakata's research and they share a secret facility on Longrivers Island (publicly restricted as a nature reserve) nearby.

The Crows follow Koichi to the Longrivers Island facility. Zafra, speaking remotely, disregard Koichi's B-device technology as they have already made significant progress with its successor, the S-device. Royd's Crows kill Koichi as they proceed through the facility, coming across the first S-device: a large weaponised Driscoll cyborg. Driscoll is once again destroyed by the Crows and they destroy the facility before escaping. The destruction is framed by the PMO as the mass suicide of the Spirit of Huffman at their secret base. The Crows disband, though Royd and Gentz join together as independent freedom fighters against the PMO.

Six months later, Frederick releases a public exposé on the truth of the conflict as discovered by the Crows. Although the OCU and USN admit partial blame, and the PMO suffers reputational damage, Zafra denies any involvement and evades consequences. Some time later during a mission, Royd and Gentz are surprised when many of the Crows return to rejoin them.

==== USN campaign ====
In the PlayStation and Nintendo DS remaster titled Front Mission 1st, the player can also play a second scenario revolving around USN officer Kevin Greenfield. Months before the Larcus Incident, Kevin and his teammates in the Black Hounds special forces unit are participating in an operation against a terrorist organization known as "The Star of Freedom". Upon finding out the location of their headquarters in the Andes Mountains, the Black Hounds execute an operation to eliminate the group. A grave mistake on Kevin's part gets him fired from the unit and arrested by USN MPs. In a last-ditch effort to remain in service, Greenfield accepts a post to the USN special weapons research division known as the "Nirvana Institute". He is then deployed to the Nirvana branch on Huffman Island, which is led by Driscoll. After a few operations with the division, the 2nd Huffman Conflict breaks out and Kevin is recalled to active duty. As the new leader of the Silver Lynx strike force, he aids the USN offensive to defeat the OCU and help end the war quickly.

== Development ==
=== Concept ===
Development of the first Front Mission started with discussions between software developers Square and G-Craft. Square had never had another developer make a game for them and planning proceeded slowly, but an agreement between the two was finished in the Fall of 1993. Game producer and writer Toshiro Tsuchida presented a proposal for a game called “100 Mission” to Square through his own development company, Solid, on G-Crafts behalf. When Square producer Shinji Hashimoto first saw the first version of the game proposal, he thought it was “too radical” and usually such proposals would not be approved. Square was not enthusiastic, repeatedly telling Tsuchida “no robots”, and being told by Square that game development couldn't just be driven by a creators passion anymore. Tsuchida also had difficulty explaining how much of a role robots would have in the proposed game, and so he obtained some development hardware to create a prototype of the title. Square was the only publisher at the time willing to consider Tsuchidas’ proposal. They finally agreed to make the game because they thought working in a new genre would be stimulating and it was a title they probably could not do themselves as to that point Square had mostly made fantasy games. Hashimoto insisted that lighter moments be included, such as the characters hanging out and playing cards, in order to balance the mood of the game which was dark and moody.

=== Initial development ===
Square and G-Craft worked together making the title, including aspects like the games graphics and sound. Because the developers wanted an immersive experience and disliked text-heavy introductions in games, they requested and were allowed to omit the usual Squaresoft branding that always appeared when Square games began. Hironobu Sakaguchi, Shinji Hashimoto, and Toshiro Tsuchida all loved robots and did a lot of brainstorming to discover elements that could be in the game. Hashimoto came up with the idea of the colonel Kirkland being in a fort in Stage 15. Many times Hashimoto would take Tsuchida's ideas and expand upon them. There was debate about whether a game for children should have a brain in the opening scene, but decided to include it anyway. Yoshitaka Amano painted an illustration for the game, and it was intended to be used as the front cover of the cartridges packaging, but it was too “imposing” and only a portion was used. The development team even went so far as to make a sample movie of the game's intro on a Macintosh for Hashimoto, which impressed upon him how dedicated and passionate the team was for the game. Sakaguchi loved plastic models, and that led to hiring Kow Yokoyama, who had a reputation for excellent modeling. Yokoyama helped craft models for the wanzer mechs and was able to help design them as though they were real weapons.

=== Music ===
Front Mission's soundtrack was composed by the joint team of Noriko Matsueda and Yoko Shimomura. Shimomura's work on the soundtrack was requested by Hironobu Sakaguchi, the vice-president of Square, due to the need for a more experienced composer to work on the project along with Matsueda. While Shimomura intended to turn down this request due to her preoccupation with the Super Mario RPG soundtrack, she changed her mind after encountering the company president, Tetsuo Mizuno, and being embarrassed to decline the request in front of him. Shimomura mainly composed the action themes, as well as the opening theme, describing the soundtrack as "passionate" due to their "motivated" work. The score was arranged by Hidenori Iwasaki for the PlayStation and DS remakes. The promotional album, Front Mission 1st Special BGM Selection, arranged by Isawaki, was released in 2003. Two songs composed by Shimomura from Front Mission, Take the Offensive and Manifold Irons, were orchestrated for the Drammatica album.

== Remakes ==
=== Front Mission 1st ===
Front Mission was remade for the PlayStation on November 23, 2003 with the title Front Mission 1st. This remake included new content and offered a new USN scenario to play through. Front Mission 1st also included new characters that would later be seen in Front Mission 4, namely Darril Traubel and Billy Renges. This remake served as the basis for the Nintendo DS port, which was released in Japan on March 22, 2007, and in North America (as Front Mission) on October 23, 2007. The PlayStation version was re-released as a PSOne Classic on the PlayStation Network in Japan on November 12, 2008.

The Nintendo DS version features battle sequences that make use of the console's dual screen setup for an easy view of the action. The port also includes a number of new additions. A number of characters from other Front Mission titles were added to the game's storyline, such as Griff Burnam and Glen Duval. New parts and weapons from other Front Mission entries were added. This version also boasted nine secret missions that further expanded the storyline.

=== Front Mission 1st: Remake ===
A further remake of Front Mission 1st, titled Front Mission 1st: Remake, was developed and published by Forever Entertainment for the Nintendo Switch on November 30, 2022. Ports to PlayStation 4, PlayStation 5, Windows, Xbox One, and Xbox Series X/S were released on June 30, 2023.

== Reception ==
=== Critical reception ===
Reception

Aggregate score
| Aggregator | Score |
|---|---|
| Metacritic | DS: 72/100; Switch: 69/100 |

Review scores
| Publication | Score |
|---|---|
| 1Up.com | 75/100 (NDS) |
| Eurogamer | 7/10 (NDS) |
| Famitsu | 31/40 (SNES); 30/40 (WS); 28/40 (PS1) |
| Game Informer | 70/100 (NDS) |
| GameRevolution | C+ (NDS) |
| GameSpy | 4/5 (NDS) |
| GamesRadar+ | 3.5/5 (NDS) |
| IGN | 78% (NDS) |
| Nintendo Life | 9/10 (SNES) |
| Nintendo Power | 65/100 (NDS) |
| Mega Fun | 86/100 (SNES) |
| Video Games | 85% (SNES) |
| Super Play | 88% (SNES) |
| Consoles + | 93/100 (SNES) |
| CD Consoles | 17/20 (SNES) |

In April 1995, Famitsu magazine gave the Super Famicom version of the game first a 9 out of 10 and later an 8 out of 10 in their Reader Cross Review. Mega Fun gave the game a Gold for an import game.

The Nintendo DS version received average reviews from critics. IGN's Mark Bozon commended the games "options", "depth", and "customization" compared to other DS tactics games, but was disappointed at the lack of online play, calling it a pure port. Nintendo Power called the game "a stark, futuristic Advance Wars without the happy combatants and vehicle variety."

=== Sales ===
The original Front Mission was a huge success in Japan, selling over 500,000 copies. Next Generation reported sales of 530,000 copies.

By the end of 2007, the Nintendo DS version sold 57,153 copies in Japan.
