= Thomas Morris (author) =

Welsh author based in Ireland, known for short stories

- Born: Caerphilly, Wales
- Occupation: Author; editor
- Education: Trinity College, Dublin; University of East Anglia
- Period: 2015–present
- Notable works: We Don't Know What We're Doing (2015); Open Up (2023)
- Notable awards: Irish Book Awards (2014); Wales Book of the Year (2016); Rhys Davies Fiction Trust Prize (2016) Somerset Maugham Prize (2016)

Website
- www.thomasmorris.net

Thomas Morris is a Welsh writer and editor. He was born and raised in Caerphilly and was educated in the Welsh language all through primary and secondary school. He worked for Welsh TV channel S4C for a period and was a trialist for Cardiff City F.C. He then moved to Ireland where he studied English and Philosophy at Trinity College Dublin, where he became chairperson of the Literary Society. During this time he became friends with, and an early editor of, Sally Rooney who described him as "the source of all her good writing advice". He is also a graduate of the University of East Anglia's MA in creative writing programme.

== Writing ==
Morris is best known as a short story writer whose work is concerned with small town life. His first book, the short story collection We Don’t Know What We’re Doing (2015) was published by Faber and Faber and received positive reviews and several awards, including the Wales Book of the Year in 2016. He was appointed Writer in Residence at University College Cork in 2017. In 2023, Thomas was named by as one of the 20 Best Young British Novelists by Granta magazine. His second Open Up, also published by Faber, was released that year.

Morris lives in Dublin and is closely associated with the city's literary scene. In 2014, he devised and edited Tramp Press's short story anthology Dubliners 100 in 2014, which won an Irish Book Award. Described by the Irish Times as "a friend and mentor to some of the finest Irish writers of [his] generation", he gave debuts to authors such as Nicole Flattery, Wendy Erskine and Michael Magee under his editorship at The Stinging Fly. Regarding his influence on Irish literature, Sally Rooney states: "Tom’s encouragement of new and emerging writers has been such a foundational part of literary culture here in Ireland over the last ten years that it’s difficult to know where we would be without it." He has described himself as "I’m Welsh first; I live in Ireland second; and I grudgingly accept that I’m British". He has said that his curiosity in Ireland was started by watching Ballykissangel and he was not fully aware of Ireland's literary heritage until after he started studying in Trinity.

Regarding's Ireland's support for writers, Morris has said "There’s a tendency in Britain to go, ah, aren’t the Irish great with their oral storytelling tradition, as if that’s where [the success] comes from. It’s hard work. One thread of the (Stinging Fly)'s history in the 25 years since it was set up is the growth of the Arts Council in that time. In Britain, the arts are still up for question – like, should we support them? Whereas in Ireland it feels like they’re important a priori – we’re going to support them. If I’m a writer in Wales wanting to send out work, where do I go? In Ireland, I could send it to the Dublin Review, Banshee, Gorse, the Tangerine, The Stinging Fly. More and more writers from Britain look to get their start here because there aren’t necessarily those outlets in the UK."

Morris is a supporter of Welsh independence.
