= Geoffrey Faber Memorial Prize =

British literary prize

The Geoffrey Faber Memorial Prize is a British literary prize established in 1963 in tribute to Geoffrey Faber, founder and first Chairman of the publisher Faber & Faber. It recognises a single volume of poetry or fiction by a United Kingdom, Irish or Commonwealth author under 40 years of age on the date of publication, and is in alternating years awarded to poetry and fiction (including short stories).

The prize is worth £1500.

The prize jury, comprising three reviewers, is selected by literary editors of journals and newspapers that regularly publish reviews of poetry and fiction.

In its first year, the prize was awarded to Christopher Middleton and George MacBeth for poetry. The first win by a short-story collection, The Quantity Theory of Insanity by Will Self, was in 1993.

== Winners ==
Year	Author	Title	Section	Jury	Reference
1964	Christopher Middleton	Torse 3 Poems 1949–1961	Poetry		
1964	George MacBeth	The Broken Places: Poems	Poetry		
1965	Frank Tuohy	The Ice Saints	Fiction		
1966	Jon Silkin	Nature Within Man	Poetry		
1967	William McIlvanney	Remedy is None	Fiction		
1967	John Noone	The Man with the Chocolate Egg	Fiction		
1968	Seamus Heaney	Death of a Naturalist	Poetry		
1969	Piers Paul Read	The Junkers	Fiction		
1970	Geoffrey Hill	King Log	Poetry		
1971	J. G. Farrell	Troubles	Fiction		
1972	Tony Harrison	The Loiners	Poetry		
1973	David Storey	Pasmore	Fiction		
1974	John Fuller	Cannibals and Missionaries and Epistles to Several Persons	Poetry		
1975	Richard B. Wright	In the Middle of a Life	Fiction		
1976	Douglas Dunn	Love or Nothing	Poetry		
1977	Carolyn Slaughter	The Story of the Weasel	Fiction		
1978	David Harsent	Dreams of the Dead	Poetry		
1978	Kit Wright	The Bear Looked Over the Mountain	Poetry		
1979	Timothy Mo	The Monkey King	Fiction		
1980	Hugo Williams	Love-Life	Poetry		
1980	George Szirtes	The Slant Door	Poetry		
1981	J. M. Coetzee	Waiting for the Barbarians	Fiction		
1982	Paul Muldoon	Why Brownlee Left	Poetry		
1982	Tom Paulin	The Strange Museum	Poetry		
1983	Graham Swift	Shuttlecock	Fiction		
1984	James Fenton	In Memory of War: Poems 1968-83	Poetry		
1985	Julian Barnes	Flaubert's Parrot	Fiction		
1986	David Scott	A Quiet Gathering	Poetry		
1987	Guy Vanderhaeghe	Man Descending	Fiction		
1988	Michael Hofmann	Acrimony: Poems	Poetry		
1989	David Profumo	Sea Music	Fiction		
1990	Michael Donaghy	Shibboleth	Poetry		
1991	Carol Birch	The Fog Line	Fiction		
1992	Paul Muldoon	Madoc: A Mystery	Poetry		
1993	Will Self	The Quantity Theory of Insanity	Fiction		
1994	John Burnside	Feast Days	Poetry	Helen Dunmore Nicolas Tredell Hugo Williams	
1995	Livi Michael	Their Angel Reach	Fiction		
1996	Kathleen Jamie	The Queen of Sheba	Poetry		
1997	Emily Perkins	Not Her Real Name	Fiction		
1998	Don Paterson	God's Gift to Women	Poetry	Robert Potts	
1999	Gavin Kramer	Shopping	Fiction		
2000	Kathleen Jamie	Jizzen	Poetry	Christina Patterson	
2001	Trezza Azzopardi	The Hiding Place	Fiction		
2002	Greta Stoddart	At Home in the Dark	Poetry		
2003	Justin Hill	The Drink and Dream Teahouse	Fiction		
2004	Glyn Maxwell	The Nerve: Poems	Poetry		
2005	David Mitchell	Cloud Atlas	Fiction		
2006	Alice Oswald	Woods Etc.	Poetry	Neil Corcoran, Lavinia Greenlaw, Ciaran Carson	
2007	Edward Docx	Self Help	Fiction		
2008	Nick Laird	On Purpose	Poetry	Jo Shapcott, Sam Leith, Michael Longley	
2009	David Szalay	London and the South-East	Fiction	Kate Summerscale, Andrew Miller, Boyd Tonkin	
2010	Kona Macphee	Perfect Blue	Poetry	Kate Kellaway, Bernard O'Donoghue, Stephen Romer	
2011	Belinda McKeon	Solace	Fiction	Rachel Cusk, Jonathan Ruppin, Leo Robson	
2012	Jacob Polley	The Havocs	Poetry	Jean Sprackland, Sarah Crown, Maurice Riordan	
2013	Eimear McBride	A Girl Is a Half-formed Thing	Fiction	Deirdre Madden, Patrick Neale, Gaby Wood	
2014	Fiona Benson	Bright Travellers	Poetry	Julia Copus, Ruth Padel, Max Porter	
2014	Liz Berry	Black Country	Poetry	Julia Copus, Ruth Padel, Max Porter	
2015	Sara Baume	Spill Simmer Falter Wither	Fiction		
2016	Kim Moore	The Art of Falling	Poetry	Gillian Clarke, Tom Gatti, Katharine Towers	
2017	Gwendoline Riley	First Love	Fiction	Lorien Kite, Susie Nicklin, Evie Wyld	
