= The Lesser Bohemians =

2016 novel by Eimear McBride

- Author: Eimear McBride
- Language: English
- Genre: Theatre-fiction
- Published: 2016 (Faber and Faber)
- Publication place: Ireland
- Media type: Print
- Pages: 320
- Awards: 2017 James Tait Black Memorial Prize
- ISBN: 978-0571327850

The Lesser Bohemians is the second novel by Eimear McBride. It was published on 1 September 2016 and won the James Tait Black Memorial Prize in 2017.

== Synopsis ==
The novel is set in 1990s Camden Town, where Eilis, an 18-year-old Irish student, arrives to take up a place at a drama school. She becomes passionately involved with Stephen, a 39-year-old professional actor. Their troubled pasts result in a turbulent relationship.

== Style ==
Fintan O'Toole described The Lesser Bohemians as having a simpler narrative voice than its predecessor, A Girl Is a Half-formed Thing, and that sentences "while still sometimes fragmented and discontinuous, come much closer to conventional structures and in consequence give themselves up much more easily."

Johanna Thomas-Corr of London Evening Standard reported on the style of the novel:

"McBride has said that the techniques of method acting have informed the way she writes, breaking down a character’s experiences of the body and the mind and then finding a language that expresses them simultaneously. You might call it stream of preconsciousness. She coins new words […] It can take a while to puzzle out some choices[…]. And McBride’s fractured syntax is well tuned to the body’s complex desires"

Reviewer Hannah Rosefield of New Statesman wrote of the style that "McBride’s unformatted language is full of compressions and inversions, nouns made into verbs and well-worn phrases torn apart."

== Critical reception ==
Writer Jeanette Winterson reviewed the novel for The New York Times, praising the novel for its experimental style whilst also distancing it from that of another well-known Irish author:

The reader’s mind runs alongside hers, and our sentences can, if we want them to, run past hers. In that sense, she really isn’t a control freak, unlike James Joyce, whose prose is a be-saved or be-damned baptism by total immersion. McBride isn’t an old-fashioned despot writer. The take-it-or-leave-it arrogance is absent. The confidence and the capacity are as good as anyone’s, male or female, but (and I’m not going to attribute it to gender, though it’s something that might be discussed sometime) there’s an openness, an inclusivity, a distinct lack of God-almightyness, that makes reading her such a pleasure.

Fintan O'Toole, writing for The Irish Times considered that The Lesser Bohemians was a "more hopeful" work than A Girl Is a Half-formed Thing, and that "the central character seems, unlike her predecessor, fully capable of making her own life. “Life”, indeed, is the novel’s last word – literally and emotionally." He drew comparisons between the novel and the works of Edna O'Brien.

Writing in the London Evening Standard, Thomas-Corr concluded that the novel "broke my heart several times over and on each occasion I had to stop to cry. McBride has made something strange and beautiful — well worth its difficulties".

In The Independent, Max Liu wrote, "McBride writes in a stream of consciousness style that's as accessible as it is startling. It can make the world new at the same time as evoking its timeless fundamentals". He did not appreciate a "60-odd page monologue of abuse, addiction and betrayal", which he found had a "capsizing effect". Reviewing the book in the Financial Times Jonathan Lee wrote that, "This may not be Eimear McBride’s strongest book, but such moments of highly specific, deeply felt experience remind us what she can do".

The Lesser Bohemians was reviewed on BBC Radio 4's programme Saturday Review on 17 September 2016.

== Awards ==
On 28 September 2016, it was announced that the book was on the shortlist of the Goldsmiths Prize. Subsequently, it was also shortlisted for the Bord Gáis Irish Book Awards and the RSL Encore Awards.

In 2017, the novel was awarded the James Tait Black Memorial Prize. It also featured in Florence Welch's Between Two Books Bookclub in 2017.
