= Claire Bennett =

Claire Bennett may refer to:

- Claire Bennet, a fictional character in the TV series Heroes
- Claire-Louise Bennett, British writer
- Claire Bennett, a fictional character in Cake (2014 film)
- Claire Bennett, a fictional character in the video game Tales of Rebirth
