= The Wounded Surgeon =

- Author: Adam Kirsch
- Language: English
- Subject: Literary criticism
- Genre: Non-fiction
- Publisher: W. W. Norton & Company
- Publication date: 2005
- Publication place: United States
- Media type: Print (Hardback)
- ISBN: 978-0-393-05197-1
- OCLC: 57168247
- LC Class: PS310.C65 K57 2005

The Wounded Surgeon: Confession and Transformation in Six American Poets is a book by Adam Kirsch, published in 2005 by W. W. Norton & Company (ISBN 978-0393051971). The book considers in turn the work of six poets whose work has often been labelled 'confessional': Robert Lowell, Elizabeth Bishop, John Berryman, Randall Jarrell, Delmore Schwartz and Sylvia Plath. Kirsch has set out to write "a brief biography of their poetry", and attempts to demonstrate that the metaphor of confession has led to a misunderstanding of their work, in particular by doing a disservice to the technique and craft that the writers brought to bear to fashion works of art.
