= Tramp Press =

Independent publisher in Ireland

- Founded: 2014
- Founders: Lisa Coen and Sarah Davis-Goff
- Country of origin: Ireland
- Headquarters location: Dublin
- Distribution: Gill (Ireland); Turnaround; Global Book Sales
- Publication types: Books
- Fiction genres: Irish fiction
- Official website: www.tramppress.com

Tramp Press is a publishing company founded in Dublin in 2014 by Lisa Coen and Sarah Davis-Goff. It is an independent publisher that specialises in Irish fiction. The company is named after John Millington Synge's tramp, a reference to the bold outsider.

== Publishing history ==
Tramp Press published its inaugural title in April 2014. Flight, the debut novel of Oona Frawley, went on to be shortlisted for Best Newcomer Award at the Bord Gáis Energy Irish Book Awards. The book also received positive reviews in both The Guardian and The Irish Times.

Dubliners 100: 15 New Stories Inspired by the Original, edited by Thomas Morris, was released in June 2014 on the centenary of the publication of James Joyce's Dubliners. It comprises short fiction from established and emerging writers – including John Kelly, Mary Morrissy, Belinda McKeon and Eimear McBride – and an introduction by Morris.

Dubliners 100 won the Journal.ie Best Irish-Published Book Award at the Bord Gáis Energy Irish Book Awards while Donal Ryan's story for the collection, entitled Eveline, was shortlisted for the Writing.ie Best Short Story Award. It also received positive reviews in The Guardian, Irish Times and The Times Literary Supplement. The book was mentioned ahead of its publication in The New York Times.

A Struggle for Fame by Charlotte Riddell was the first in a series called 'Recovered Voices', which aims to showcase literature that has been largely forgotten. The Irish Independent described this rediscovered book by a prolific author as a "rare treat".

In 2015, Tramp Press published Sara Baume's debut novel Spill Simmer Falter Wither. Baume won the Davy Byrnes Award and the Hennessy New Irish Writer 2015 award. The novel was described as an exciting debut by writer Joseph O'Connor and rights were sold to UK publisher Heinemann.

In May 2016, Tramp Press published Mike McCormack's novel Solar Bones which won the year's Goldsmiths Prize. Vertigo by Joanna Walsh was published in March 2016. Orange Horses by Maeve Kelly was 2016's Recovered Voices title.

Tramp Press' 2017 catalogue included The Iron Age by Arja Kajermo, A Line Made By Walking by Sara Baume and The Unforeseen by Dorothy Macardle. The Unforeseen was part of the Recovered Voices series.

2018 saw the publication of Emilie Pine's essay collection Notes to Self. This was Tramp's first foray into non-fiction. The book won the An Post Irish Book of the Year of 2018. Tramp Press also published the novel Problems by Jade Sharma in May 2018 and A Brilliant Void: A Selection of Classic Irish Science Fiction, which was edited by Irish academic Jack Fennell. A Brilliant Void was part of the Recovered Voices series.

In 2019, Tramp Press published a novel, The Red Word by Sarah Henstra, and Minor Monuments, an essay collection by Irish journalist Ian Maleney.

In 2020, Tramp Press published "A Ghost In The Throat" by Doireann Ní Ghríofa.

== Irish Book Awards ==
Tramp Press novels have performed strongly at the Irish Book Awards, claiming the top prize in three years out of five - Solar Bones in 2016, Notes To Self in 2018 and A Ghost In The Throat in 2020.

=== Tramp Press books ===
Flight by Oona Frawley – 2014

Dubliners 100: 15 New Stories Inspired by the Original edited by Thomas Morris - 2014

A Struggle for Fame by Charlotte Riddell - 2014

A Kind of Compass: Stories on Distance edited by Belinda McKeon - 2015

Spill Simmer Falter Wither by Sara Baume - 2015

The Uninvited by Dorothy Macardle - 2015 (Recovered Voices series)

Vertigo by Joanna Walsh - 2016

Solar Bones by Mike McCormack - 2016

Orange Horses by Maeve Kelly - 2016 (Recovered Voices series)

The Iron Age by Arja Kajermo - 2017

A Line Made By Walking by Sara Baume - 2017

The Unforeseen by Dorothy Macardle - 2017 (Recovered Voices series)

Notes to Self by Emilie Pine - 2018

Problems by Jade Sharma - 2018

A Brilliant Void: A Selection of Classic Irish Science Fiction edited by Jack Fennell – 2018

The Red Word by Sarah Henstra – 2019

Minor Monuments by Ian Maleney – 2019

Dark Enchantment by Dorothy Macardle (Recovered Voices series) - 2019

The Seven Necessary Sins for Women and Girls by Mona Eltahawy - 2019

A Ghost In The Throat by Doireann Ní Ghríofa - 2020

handiwork by Sara Baume - 2020

Corpsing by Sophie White - 2020

Line by Niall Bourke - 2020

It Rose Up: A Selection of Lost Irish Fantasy Stories edited by Jack Fennell - 2021

Where I End by Sophie White - 2022

The Horse of Selene by Juanita Casey (Recovered Voices series) - 2022

seven steeples by Sara Baume - 2022

Fayne by Ann-Marie MacDonald (Recovered Voices series) - 2023

The Plague of Souls by Mike McCormack - 2023

=== Publishing awards ===
In 2015, Tramp Press won the David Manley Award for Emerging Arts Entrepreneur and was also shortlisted for a Blacknight SME award.
