= Tuula =

Tuula may refer to:

== People ==
- Tuula Haatainen (born 1960), Finnish politician
- Tuula Hovi (born 1939), Finnish orienteering competitor
- Tuula Kallioniemi (born 1951), Finnish author
- Tuula Laaksalo (born 1953), Finnish javelin thrower
- Tuula Peltonen (born 1962), Finnish politician
- Tuula Puputti (born 1977), Finnish ice hockey player
- Tuula Rautanen (born 1942), Finnish sprinter
- Tuula Teeri (born 1957), Finnish molecular geneticist
- Tuula Tenkanen (born 1990), Finnish sailor
- Tuula Vilkas (born 1950), Finnish speed skater
- Tuula Väätäinen (born 1955), Finnish politician
- Tuula Yrjölä, Finnish diplomat

== Places ==
- Tuula, Estonia

== Other ==
- Tuula (comic)
