= Laura Stevens =

South African-British composer

- Born: Cape Town, South Africa
- Genres: Film score, contemporary classical, ballet music
- Occupations: Composer, arranger, producer
- Instruments: Piano, cello, keyboards

Laura Stevens is a South African and British composer of music for concert hall, film and media, stage and dance.

Stevens composed the original score for the documentary Elephant Refugees (2022, dir. Louise Hogarth) , narrated by Jerome Flynn; and various ballet music works for the English National Ballet.

She is also known for collaborating with living poets on musical settings of their work, among them Katharine Towers and Hollie McNish

== Music ==
Stevens created the original score for documentary Elephant Refugees in 2022, directed by Louise Hogarth, an account of elephants fleeing drought in Botswana

In 2016 the English National Ballet commissioned Stevens to compose the music for Unsilenced, the youth ballet accompaniment to their She Said triple bill project. The work was danced at Sadler’s Wells Theatre, London and the Britten Theatre.

Previously, she had worked with the company on their Choreographics showcase at Sadler’s Wells, collaborating with choreographer Morgann Runacre-Temple on her work Give my Love to the Sunrise

Stevens has written in cross-disciplinary genres, having also collaborated with poets Katharine Towers on a musical setting of her poem “the way we go”, for Soprano and Piano, with a subsequent choral arrangement for Swedish choir Linköping Studentssangerer; and Hollie McNish on her debut music and poetry album Versus recorded at Abbey Road.

In 2015, her orchestral work Long Walk an homage to late president Nelson Mandela was performed in South Africa by the Cape Philharmonic Orchestra under Tokyo Philharmonic conductor and LA philharmonic assistant-conductor Yasuo Shinozaki.

In 2012 Stevens created music for animations produced by the Royal Shakespeare Company, and Central St Martins. These were broadcast on BBC Arts Channel and at the Edinburgh Festival.

Stevens worked with Swiss director Christina Ruloff and artist Beat Toniolo, creating the original music for their TV film Z Kiev redt mer Mundaart, about the life and exploits of Swiss dialect poet Albert Baechtold. It was distributed and broadcast on Swiss Channel SRF1 and featured Swiss actor Andrea Zogg.

A frequent musical partner is Turkish composer Nazım Çınar . In 2023 she played and arranged cello on his score for theatre work Imparator by Turkish thespian and activist Genco Erkal.

== Early life ==
Stevens was born in Cape Town, South Africa, lives London, United Kingdom .

She attended the Royal College of Music and the South African College of Music, at the University of Cape Town.
