= Checkout 19 =

2022 book by Claire-Louise Bennett

- Author: Claire-Louise Bennett
- Language: English
- Publisher: Penguin Random House
- Publication date: 2022
- Publication place: England
- Pages: 288
- ISBN: 9780593420492
- Preceded by: Pond
- Followed by: Big Kiss, Bye-Bye

Checkout 19 is a novel by British writer Claire-Louise Bennett. It is Bennet's second book, after Pond. It was selected for The New York Times's "10 Best Books of 2022" list. The book was also shortlisted for the Goldsmiths Prize, which seeks to celebrate novels which expand the possibilities of the novel as an art form. The novel follows an unnamed female narrator from early childhood to adulthood, documenting her interactions with books and how those interactions shaped her life. The book has been described as an example of autofiction, or a fictionalized, autobiographical account of Bennett's life.

== Narrative ==
The book begins with the unnamed narrator (who comes from a working class background) in primary school in Southwest England. She begins writing stories in the margins of her exercise textbook. One of these stories is discovered by her favorite teacher, Mr. Burton, who asks her to write more stories for him. She agrees and presents stories to him on a weekly basis, taking great pleasure in knowing that her works are being appreciated by another. Later in life, the narrator moves to Ireland where she becomes a writer. Her relationships to various people she meets, including her boyfriends, are documented mainly through the books she is reading, writing or having recommended to her at the time. There is the Russian man who seeks out the checkout line of the grocery store that she is working at, checkout 19, to discuss literature with her and give her a copy of Nietzsche's Beyond Good and Evil. There is the boyfriend who hates all of the books that she has recommended to him, or the boyfriend who only reads biographies of men, or another boyfriend-envious that her writing took her attention away from him-tore up a manuscript that she was working on. The novel describes the author's process of writing, and remembering the process of writing the manuscript; a story about the hedonistic, wealthy Tarquin Superbus. Superbus, a pretentious aristocrat commissioned construction of a vast library to find to his dismay that all of the pages in the books comprising the library are blank. But Superbus is told that there is a single sentence in the library, that "contains everything" and that if discovered will cause an awakening of great power, allowing the wonders of the world to be revealed to him. The book also details many of the historical writers that the narrator has discovered and becomes captivated upon at various times of her life; including Ann Quin, Elaine Showalter, Roald Dahl, Anaïs Nin, E. M. Forster and Anna Kavan.

== Reception ==
The book was generally well received by critics. Writing for The New York Times, critic Naomi Huffman, referencing the book's place in the category of autofiction, a genre that may have been exhausted by previous works, states: "Checkout 19 suggests it perhaps hasn't yet been fully explored. True, Bennett shares a similar biography to that of her narrator, but the life she describes is one blown open by imaginative writing, by the work other writers have fashioned from their own lives, and by the transformative and transportive nature of reading." Regarding the book's central theme of the protagonist's interaction with literature, Leo Robson of The Guardian states: "An immersion in literature serves to inspire in a larger sense, to inflame a feeling of wonder and possibility – a dynamic not only evoked but also achieved by this elatingly risky and irreducible book." Regarding the author's unconventional style, with the protagonist's lengthy digressions and rich descriptions of literature, Nina Renata Aron, writing for the Los Angeles Times stated: "In the telling of a life lived through books, and in her own sometimes floridly erudite sentences, the deep magic of writing is revealed." Writing for NPR, Lily Meyer also praised Bennet's unconventional narrative. Meyer stated that in writing the protagonist as unattached, indeed unattached to many of the other characters in the book, instead focusing on inner dialogue and reflections and memories of literature, she is able to portray this protagonist in a more intimate fashion.
