= Doireann Ní Ghríofa =

Irish poet

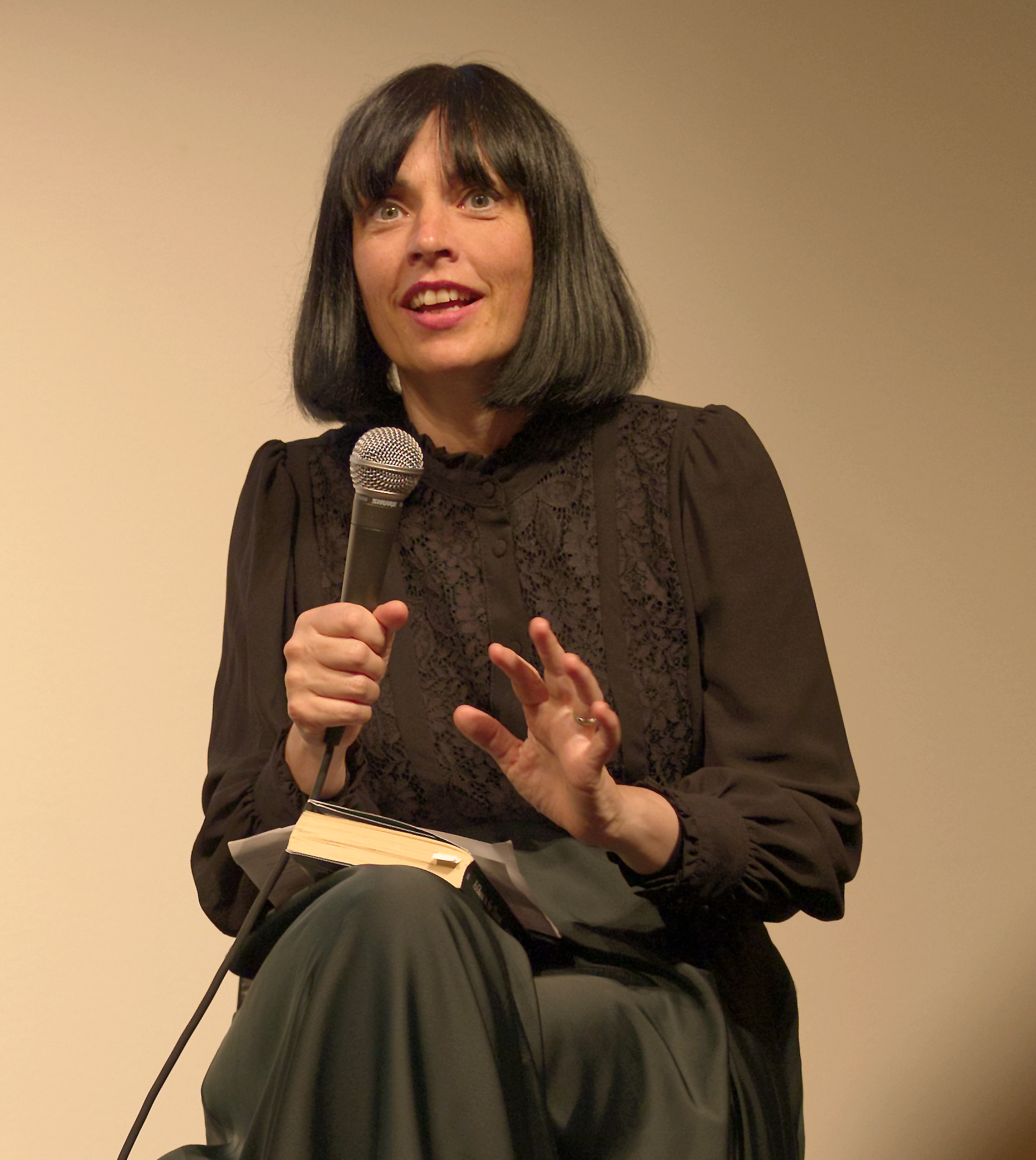
Doireann Ní Ghríofa (2023)

Doireann Ní Ghríofa (Irish: [ˈd̪ˠɪɾʲən̪ˠ ˌnʲiː ˈʝɾʲiːfˠə]; English: /ˈdɪrən ˌniː ˈɡriːfə/) is an Irish poet and essayist who writes in both Irish and English.

== Early life and education ==
Doireann Ní Ghríofa was born in Galway in 1981 but grew up in County Clare.

== Writing career ==
Ní Ghríofa has been published widely in literary magazines in Ireland and abroad, such as Poetry, Prairie Schooner, and The Stinging Fly, as well as in newspapers such as The Irish Times and the Irish Examiner, In 2012 her poem "Fáinleoga" won the Wigtown Award for poetry written in Scottish Gaelic. Ní Ghríofa was selected for the prestigious Ireland Chair of Poetry Bursary Award 2014–2015.

A trilingual collaborative pamphlet written with Choctaw poet LeAnne Howe appeared in 2017. Ní Ghríofa collaborated with the artist Alice Maher on the limited edition book Nine Silences published by Salvage Press in 2018. In 2019, she was a contributor to A New Divan: A Lyrical Dialogue between East and West (Gingko Library).

== Recognition ==
In 2016 her book Clasp was shortlisted for The Irish Times Poetry Now Award, the national poetry prize of Ireland and was awarded the Michael Hartnett Award. She was also awarded the Rooney Prize for Irish Literature in 2016.

In 2018, Ní Ghríofa received the Premio Ostana literary award (Italy) and was chosen as a Seamus Heaney Centre Fellow at Queen's University Belfast.

In 2020 her book A Ghost in the Throat won Book of the Year at the An Post Irish Book of the Year awards, the Foyles Non-Fiction Book of the Year award and the Hodges Figgis Irish Book of the Year award. It was shortlisted for the 2021 Folio Prize, named as a New York Times Notable Book of the Year and a Publishers Weekly Best Book of 2021. The book was largely written as she sat in her car on the roof of a multi-storey car park in Ballincollig, after dropping her daughter to creche.

In 2021, A Ghost in the Throat won the £10,000 James Tait Black Prize for biography.

Ní Ghríofa's poem "Escape: A Chorus in Capes" from her 2021 collection To Star The Dark was deemed Highly Commended by the Forward Prize For Poetry. The collection also features poems "While Bleeding", "Craquelure" and "Lunulae." To Star the Dark is counted amongst the 'Best Poetry of 2021' by The Irish Times.

She is a recipient of a Lannan Literary Award Fellowship.

She was shortlisted for the 2026 Goldsmiths Prize for Said the Dead.

== Bibliography ==
=== Poetry collections ===
- Résheoid (Coiscéim, 2011)
- Dúlasair (Coiscéim, 2012)
- Dordéan, do Chroí / A Hummingbird, your Heart (Smithereens Press, 2014)
- Clasp (Dedalus Press, 2015; ISBN 9781910251027)
- Oighear (Coiscéim, 2017)
- Singing, Still - A Libretto for the 1847 Choctaw Gift to the Irish for Famine Relief (In collaboration with LeAnn Howe, 2017)
- Lies (Dedalus Press, 2018; ISBN 9781910251393)
- To Star the Dark (Dedalus Press, 2021; ISBN 9781910251867)

=== Prose ===
- A Ghost in the Throat (Tramp Press and Biblioasis, 2020)
- Said the Dead (Faber & Faber and Farrar, Straus and Giroux, 2026)

== Critical response ==
Of Ní Ghríofa's book Clasp, Maya Catherine Popa in Poetry wrote: "The poems excel in their consideration of motherhood, particularly its paradoxical losses and gains, separation and unity… In Ní Ghríofa’s English debut, what seem to be long-considered obsessions are explored with tenderness and unflinching curiosity. The collection’s section titles, “Clasp,” “Cleave,” “Clench,” suggest the muscularity of attachment to the past, place, and the body that drives the poetic impulse."

According to Clíona Ní Riordáin of Southword, "The woman’s body is central to the collection, highlighted, visible, unconquered. Forgotten bones are reclaimed, gendered territory is staked out; it is clear that Ní Ghríofa's has a voice which will not be silenced… In Clasp Ní Ghríofa has signalled that she is a poetic force to be reckoned with."

Nina McLaughlin of the New York Times has said of A Ghost in the Throat: "[It is] a powerful, bewitching blend of memoir and literary investigation...Ní Ghríofa is deeply attuned to the gaps, silences and mysteries in women's lives, and the book reveals, perhaps above all else, how we absorb what we love - a child, a lover, a poem - and how it changes us from the inside out."

== Documentary ==
The 2022 documentary Aisling Trí Néallaibh: Clouded Reveries (directed by Ciara Nic Chormaic) is an intimate exploration of Ní Ghríofa’s world and creative process, captured through intimate performances of her own work and in-depth interviews.
