= Goldsmiths Prize =

Literary award for British and Irish novels

The Goldsmiths Prize
- Awarded for: Innovative or experimental novels
- Location: United Kingdom and Ireland
- Presented by: Goldsmiths, University of London The New Statesman
- Reward: £10,000
- First award: 13 November 2013
- Website: https://www.gold.ac.uk/goldsmiths-prize/

The Goldsmiths Prize is a British literary award, founded in 2013 by Goldsmiths, University of London, in association with the New Statesman. It is awarded annually to a British or Irish piece of fiction that "breaks the mould or extends the possibilities of the novel form." It is limited to citizens and residents of the United Kingdom and the Republic of Ireland, and to novels published by presses based in the United Kingdom or the Republic of Ireland. The winner receives £10,000.

Tim Parnell of the Goldsmiths English department conceived and runs the prize, inspired by his research into Laurence Sterne and other eighteenth-century writers, like Denis Diderot, who experimented with the novel form. The prize "casts its net wider than most other prizes" and intends to celebrate "creative daring," but resists the phrase "experimental fiction," because it implies "an eccentric deviation from the novel’s natural concerns, structures and idioms."

To date, Rachel Cusk is the author most frequently represented on the prize's shortlists, having been shortlisted four times for Outline (2014), Transit (2016), Kudos (2018), and Parade (2024). Nine authors have been shortlisted twice: Amy Arnold, Sara Baume, Will Eaves, Deborah Levy, Eimear McBride, Anakana Schofield, Ali Smith, Adam Thirwell, and Isabel Waidner.

== Winners and shortlists ==
Key
winner
shortlisted

Shortlisted and winning books
Year	Author	Novel	Publisher	Notes
2026	China Miéville	The Rouse	Picador	The shortlist was announced on 30 September. The Winner was announced on 4 November
2026	Polly Barton	What Am I, A Deer?	Fitzcarraldo Editions	The shortlist was announced on 30 September. The Winner was announced on 4 November
2026	Doireann Ní Ghríofa	Said the Dead	Faber	The shortlist was announced on 30 September. The Winner was announced on 4 November
2026	Keith Ridgway	Dooneen	Fitzcarraldo Editions	The shortlist was announced on 30 September. The Winner was announced on 4 November
2026	Aea Varfis-van Warmelo	Attention Seeking Behaviour	Peninsula Press	The shortlist was announced on 30 September. The Winner was announced on 4 November
2026	Missouri Williams	The Vivisectors	4th Estate	The shortlist was announced on 30 September. The Winner was announced on 4 November
2025	CD Rose	We Live Here Now	Melville House Publishing	The shortlist was announced on 2 October, with the winner announced on 5 November.
2025	Colwill Brown	We Pretty Pieces of Flesh	Vintage	The shortlist was announced on 2 October, with the winner announced on 5 November.
2025	Yrsa Daley-Ward	The Catch	Penguin	The shortlist was announced on 2 October, with the winner announced on 5 November.
2025	Sarah Hall	Helm	Faber & Faber	The shortlist was announced on 2 October, with the winner announced on 5 November.
2025	Ben Pester	The Expansion Project	Granta	The shortlist was announced on 2 October, with the winner announced on 5 November.
2025	Charlie Porter	Nova Scotia House	Particular	The shortlist was announced on 2 October, with the winner announced on 5 November.
2024	Rachel Cusk	Parade	Faber & Faber	The shortlist was announced on 2 October, with the winner announced on 6 November.
2024	Mark Bowles	All My Precious Madness	Galley Beggar	The shortlist was announced on 2 October, with the winner announced on 6 November.
2024	Jonathan Buckley	Tell	Fitzcaraldo	The shortlist was announced on 2 October, with the winner announced on 6 November.
2024	Neel Mukherjee	Choice	Atlantic	The shortlist was announced on 2 October, with the winner announced on 6 November.
2024	Lara Pawson	Spent Light	CB Editions	The shortlist was announced on 2 October, with the winner announced on 6 November.
2024	Han Smith	Portraits at the Palace of Creativity and Wrecking	John Murray	The shortlist was announced on 2 October, with the winner announced on 6 November.
2023	Benjamin Myers	Cuddy	Bloomsbury	The shortlist was announced on 4 October, with the winner announced on 8 November.
2023	Amy Arnold	Lori & Joe	Prototype	The shortlist was announced on 4 October, with the winner announced on 8 November.
2023	Kate Briggs	The Long Form	Fitzcarraldo Editions	The shortlist was announced on 4 October, with the winner announced on 8 November.
2023	H. Gareth Gavin	Never Was	Cipher Press	The shortlist was announced on 4 October, with the winner announced on 8 November.
2023	Richard Milward	Man-Eating Typewriter	White Rabbit	The shortlist was announced on 4 October, with the winner announced on 8 November.
2023	Adam Thirlwell	The Future Future	Cape	The shortlist was announced on 4 October, with the winner announced on 8 November.
2022	Natasha Soobramanien and Luke Williams	Diego Garcia	Fitzcarraldo Editions	The shortlist was announced on 5 October, and the winner on 10 November.
2022	Mona Arshi	Somebody Loves You	And Other Stories	The shortlist was announced on 5 October, and the winner on 10 November.
2022	Sara Baume	Seven Steeples	Tramp Press	The shortlist was announced on 5 October, and the winner on 10 November.
2022	Maddie Mortimer	Maps of Our Spectacular Bodies	Picador	The shortlist was announced on 5 October, and the winner on 10 November.
2022	Helen Oyeyemi	Peaces	Faber & Faber	The shortlist was announced on 5 October, and the winner on 10 November.
2022	Yara Rodrigues Fowler	there are more things	Fleet	The shortlist was announced on 5 October, and the winner on 10 November.
2021	Isabel Waidner	Sterling Karat Gold	Peninsula Press	The shortlist was announced on 6 October, and the winner on 10 November.
2021	Claire-Louise Bennett	Checkout 19	Jonathan Cape	The shortlist was announced on 6 October, and the winner on 10 November.
2021	Natasha Brown	Assembly	Hamish Hamilton	The shortlist was announced on 6 October, and the winner on 10 November.
2021	Keith Ridgway	A Shock	New Directions	The shortlist was announced on 6 October, and the winner on 10 November.
2021	Leone Ross	This One Sky Day	Faber and Faber	The shortlist was announced on 6 October, and the winner on 10 November.
2021	Rebecca Watson	little scratch	Faber and Faber	The shortlist was announced on 6 October, and the winner on 10 November.
2020	M. John Harrison	The Sunken Land Begins to Rise Again	Gollancz	The shortlist was announced on 14 October, and the winner on 11 November.
2020	Paul Griffiths	Mr Beethoven	Henningham Family Press	The shortlist was announced on 14 October, and the winner on 11 November.
2020	Xiaolu Guo	A Lover's Discourse	Chatto & Windus	The shortlist was announced on 14 October, and the winner on 11 November.
2020	DBC Pierre	Meanwhile in Dopamine City	Faber	The shortlist was announced on 14 October, and the winner on 11 November.
2020	Monique Roffey	The Mermaid of Black Conch	Peepal Tree Press	The shortlist was announced on 14 October, and the winner on 11 November.
2020	Anakana Schofield	Bina	Fleet	The shortlist was announced on 14 October, and the winner on 11 November.
2019	Lucy Ellmann	Ducks, Newburyport	Galley Beggar Press	The shortlist was announced on 2 October, and the winner on 13 November.
2019	Isabel Waidner	We Are Made of Diamond Stuff	Dostoyevsky Wannabe	The shortlist was announced on 2 October, and the winner on 13 November.
2019	Vesna Main	Good Day?	Salt	The shortlist was announced on 2 October, and the winner on 13 November.
2019	Amy Arnold	Slip of a Fish	And Other Stories	The shortlist was announced on 2 October, and the winner on 13 November.
2019	Mark Haddon	The Porpoise	Chatto & Windus	The shortlist was announced on 2 October, and the winner on 13 November.
2019	Deborah Levy	The Man Who Saw Everything	Hamish Hamilton	The shortlist was announced on 2 October, and the winner on 13 November.
2018	Robin Robertson	The Long Take	Picador	The shortlist was announced on 26 September, and the winner on 14 November.
2018	Rachel Cusk	Kudos	Faber	The shortlist was announced on 26 September, and the winner on 14 November.
2018	Will Eaves	Murmur	CB Editions	The shortlist was announced on 26 September, and the winner on 14 November.
2018	Guy Gunaratne	In Our Mad and Furious City	Headline	The shortlist was announced on 26 September, and the winner on 14 November.
2018	Gabriel Josipovici	The Cemetery in Barnes	Carcanet	The shortlist was announced on 26 September, and the winner on 14 November.
2018	Olivia Laing	Crudo	Picador	The shortlist was announced on 26 September, and the winner on 14 November.
2017	Nicola Barker	H(A)PPY	William Heinemann	The shortlist was announced on 27 September, and the winner on 15 November 2017.
2017	Sara Baume	A Line Made by Walking	William Heinemann	The shortlist was announced on 27 September, and the winner on 15 November 2017.
2017	Kevin Davey	Playing Possum	Aaargh! Press	The shortlist was announced on 27 September, and the winner on 15 November 2017.
2017	Jon McGregor	Reservoir 13	Fourth Estate	The shortlist was announced on 27 September, and the winner on 15 November 2017.
2017	Gwendoline Riley	First Love	Granta	The shortlist was announced on 27 September, and the winner on 15 November 2017.
2017	Will Self	Phone	Viking	The shortlist was announced on 27 September, and the winner on 15 November 2017.
2016	Mike McCormack	Solar Bones	Tramp Press	The shortlist was announced on 28 September, and the winner on 9 November.
2016	Deborah Levy	Hot Milk	Hamish Hamilton	The shortlist was announced on 28 September, and the winner on 9 November.
2016	Sarah Ladipo Manyika	Like a Mule Bringing Ice Cream to the Sun	Cassava Republic Press	The shortlist was announced on 28 September, and the winner on 9 November.
2016	Anakana Schofield	Martin John	And Other Stories	The shortlist was announced on 28 September, and the winner on 9 November.
2016	Eimear McBride	The Lesser Bohemians	Faber and Faber	The shortlist was announced on 28 September, and the winner on 9 November.
2016	Rachel Cusk	Transit	Jonathan Cape	The shortlist was announced on 28 September, and the winner on 9 November.
2015	Kevin Barry	Beatlebone	Canongate	The shortlist was announced on 1 October, and the winner on 11 November. All the authors on the shortlist were men.
2015	Richard Beard	Acts of the Assassins	Vintage	The shortlist was announced on 1 October, and the winner on 11 November. All the authors on the shortlist were men.
2015	Magnus Mills	The Field of the Cloth of Gold	Bloomsbury Publishing	The shortlist was announced on 1 October, and the winner on 11 November. All the authors on the shortlist were men.
2015	Tom McCarthy	Satin Island	Jonathan Cape	The shortlist was announced on 1 October, and the winner on 11 November. All the authors on the shortlist were men.
2015	Max Porter	Grief Is the Thing with Feathers	Faber and Faber	The shortlist was announced on 1 October, and the winner on 11 November. All the authors on the shortlist were men.
2015	Adam Thirlwell	Lurid & Cute	Jonathan Cape	The shortlist was announced on 1 October, and the winner on 11 November. All the authors on the shortlist were men.
2014	Ali Smith	How to Be Both	Penguin	The shortlist was announced on 1 October, and the winner on 12 November.
2014	Rachel Cusk	Outline	Vintage	The shortlist was announced on 1 October, and the winner on 12 November.
2014	Will Eaves	The Absent Therapist	CB Editions	The shortlist was announced on 1 October, and the winner on 12 November.
2014	Howard Jacobson	J	Jonathan Cape	The shortlist was announced on 1 October, and the winner on 12 November.
2014	Paul Kingsnorth	The Wake	Unbound Publishing	The shortlist was announced on 1 October, and the winner on 12 November.
2014	Zia Haider Rahman	In the Light of What We Know	Picador	The shortlist was announced on 1 October, and the winner on 12 November.
2013	Eimear McBride	A Girl Is a Half-formed Thing	Galley Beggar Press	The shortlist was announced on 1 October, and the winner on 13 November.
2013	Philip Terry	tapestry	Reality Street	The shortlist was announced on 1 October, and the winner on 13 November.
2013	Jim Crace	Harvest	Picador	The shortlist was announced on 1 October, and the winner on 13 November.
2013	Lars Iyer	Exodus	Melville House	The shortlist was announced on 1 October, and the winner on 13 November.
2013	David Peace	Red or Dead	Faber and Faber	The shortlist was announced on 1 October, and the winner on 13 November.
2013	Ali Smith	Artful	Penguin Books	The shortlist was announced on 1 October, and the winner on 13 November.
