= Nicholas Ruddock =

Canadian writer and medical doctor

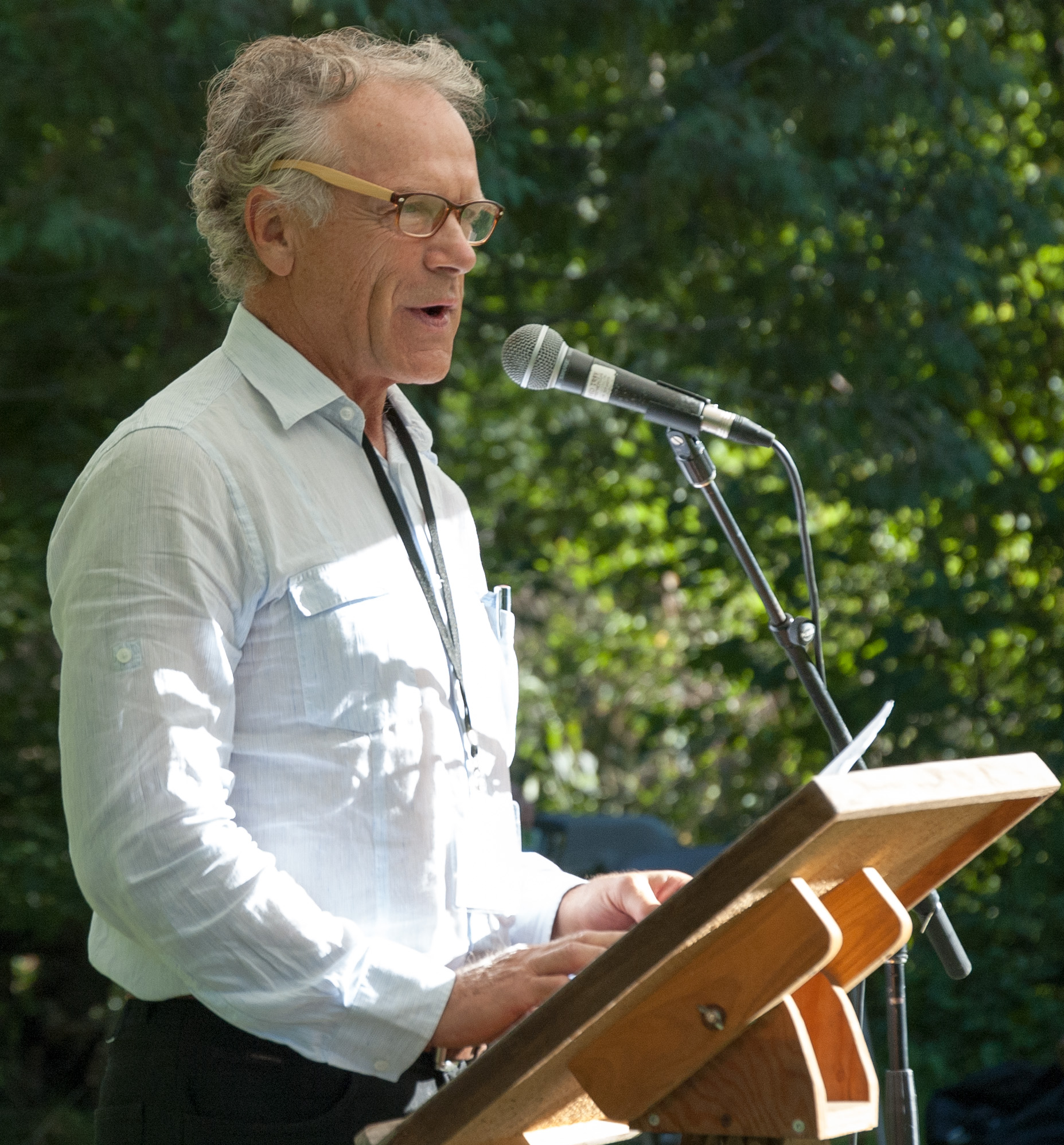
Ruddock at the Eden Mills Writers' Festival in 2016

Nicholas Ruddock is a Canadian writer. He is the author of two novels, The Parabolist (DoubleDay 2010) and Night Ambulance (Breakwater 2016), and a collection of short stories, How Loveta Got Her Baby (Breakwater 2014). In 2016, he was shortlisted for the richest story prize in the world, the EFG Short Story Award, for his story "The Phosphorescence."

Ruddock was born in Ottawa and raised in the Eglinton Avenue Road area of Toronto. His father was a French professor, his mother a teacher. He attended the University of Toronto Schools and the University of Toronto Medical School. He then set out for Newfoundland and Labrador, interning in St. John's and serving as District Medical Officer in Belleoram, Fortune Bay. Subsequently, he married the artist Cheryl Ruddock and they have raised their family of four children in the Yukon, Montreal, and Guelph, Ontario.

Ruddock is a practicing medical doctor.

== Publications ==
=== Books ===
- How Loveta Got Her Baby, Breakwater 2014
- The Parabolist, Doubleday 2010
- Night Ambulance, Breakwater 2016

=== Magazines and journals ===
In Canada, Ruddock's writing has been published in The Dalhousie Review, The Antigonish Review, Fiddlehead, Prism International, Grain, sub-Terrain, Event, and Exile. In England, in The Bridport Anthology. In Ireland, Irish Pages and the Fish Anthology. His short story, “How Eunice Got Her Baby” was published in The Journey Prize Anthology in 2007, and the Canadian Film Centre has made a film adaptation of the same story, narrated by Gordon Pinsent, directed by Ana Valine.
