= The Echo Chamber =

2011 novel by Luke Williams

- First edition, with quote from Ali Smith
- Author: Luke Williams
- Cover artist: gray318
- Language: English
- Publisher: Hamish Hamilton
- Publication date: 2011
- Publication place: United Kingdom
- Media type: Print
- Pages: 384
- ISBN: 0-241-14300-4

The Echo Chamber is the debut novel of Scottish author Luke Williams, published in 2011. The Saltire Society awarded it the Scottish First Book of the Year prize that year. As revealed in the book's acknowledgements, two of the chapters, extracts from the diary of Damaris, a young woman and Evie's first lover, were written by a friend, Natasha Soobramanien.

== Plot introduction ==
The novel concerns Evie Steppman, who aged 54 and living in Gullane in Scotland, tells of her life growing up in 1940s Lagos at the end of British rule in Nigeria, and more specifically of her auditory abilities as she maps the world around her through her amazing sense of hearing, beginning in the womb... with things happening.

== Inspiration ==
In an interview with the Scottish Book Trust, Williams reveals that his interest in Nigeria started with authors such as Amos Tutuola, Cyprian Ekwensi, Buchi Emecheta, Ben Okri and Ken Saro-Wiwa. While studying History at the University of Edinburgh, he became fascinated by the end of the Colonial period in West Africa. At St Andrews University, he studied Imperial history and was shocked when he realised how little he was taught about the violence underpinning colonialism, for example the Benin Massacre, and it was this need to reveal some of this truth that provoked him to write the novel.

== Reception ==
- James Hopkin writing in The Guardian praises the power of the embedded narratives despite the similarity of some of the voices but he concludes, "Stuffed with stories, literary references and peculiar details, a history of troubled objects, this beguiling novel is a work of astonishing synthesis...by the time you finish this rich and resonant book, your ears are sure to be twitching".
- Jonathan Gibbs of The Independent calls it a remarkable novel, "This is a book in love with stories. Barely a character appears but they launch into an anecdote, a fable or a cautionary tale...For the echo chamber isn't just the human head, womb and chest (though it is all of those things): it is the novel form itself, made out of echoes of other novels, and itself. Williams is explicit about this in his acknowledgements, citing books on colonial Africa he has adapted passages from, plus others by Georges Perec, Bruno Schulz and Isaac Babel...it will be a careless reader who isn't impelled to flip back to the start of the book on finishing it, to seek out the original sources of all those resonances".
- Kirkus Reviews has reservations, however: "This ambitious, rambling synthesis of individual and world history, stylistically akin to work by Salman Rushdie and Günter Grass, nevertheless lacks their vigor and originality. Vivid but not quite magical enough
