= Diego Garcia (novel) =

2022 novel by Natasha Soobramanien and Luke Williams

- Author: Natasha Soobramanien, Luke Williams
- Publication date: 25 May 2022
- ISBN: 9781635901627

Diego Garcia is a novel by Natasha Soobramanien and Luke Williams, published in 2022 by Fitzcarraldo Editions, which won the Goldsmiths Prize that year. It is the first collaborative novel to win the prize.

== Synopsis ==
The book tells the story of two British friends, both writers, who, after meeting a poet named Diego, learn about the forced expulsion of Chagossian people from their island homes between 1968 and 1973 by the British government, to make way for a US military base. They feel the urge to write about this as well as the continued resistance of the Chagossians.

== Critical reception and reviews ==
Tom Gatti of New Statesman wrote that "Political narratives are questioned, social structures reimagined and, in this exhilarating, generous novel, the act of storytelling is made new". The book was reviewed in The Guardian, Buzz Magazine, The Times Literary Supplement, and 3:AM Magazine.
