= Luke Williams (author) =

Scottish author (born 1977)

Luke Williams (born 1977) is a Scottish author, whose first novel The Echo Chamber won the 2011 Saltire Society's Scottish First Book of the Year award. He co-authored a book with Natasha Soobramanien, titled Diego Garcia, which won the Goldsmiths Prize in 2022. Williams teaches Creative Writing at Birkbeck.

== Life ==
Williams grew up in Fife and lives in both London and Edinburgh. He studied history at the University of Edinburgh and the University of St Andrews. He completed an MA in creative writing at the University of East Anglia, where he was taught by W. G. Sebald, who influenced him greatly; Williams contributing a chapter to Saturn's Moons: A W.G. Sebald Handbook.
