= Jonathan Kirsch =

American novelist

Jonathan Kirsch is an American attorney, writer, and columnist for the Los Angeles Times. He is an author of books on religion, the Bible, and Judaism.

== Biography ==
=== Life ===
Kirsch earned a B.A. degree in Russian and Jewish history from the University of California, Santa Cruz and a J.D. degree from Loyola Marymount University School of Law. He was editor in chief of City on a Hill Press while at UCSC. He serves as adjunct professor on the faculty of New York University’s Professional Publishing Institute and has contributed to Newsweek, The New Republic, Los Angeles magazine, and Publishers Weekly among other publications. He is also the author of ten books, and a critic.

His son, Adam Kirsch, is an American poet and literary critic.

== Books ==
- Bad Moon Rising (1977)
- Lovers in a Winter Circle (1978)
- Harlot by the Side of the Road: Forbidden Tales of the Bible. Ballantine Books (1998)
- Moses: A Life. Ballantine Books; New Ed edition (1999)
- King David: The Real Life of the Man who Ruled Israel. Ballantine Books (2001)
- The Woman who Laughed at God: The Untold History of the Jewish People. Penguin Reprint edition (2002)
- God Against the Gods: The History of the War Between Monotheism and Polytheism. Viking Adult (2004) ISBN 0-670-03286-7
- A History of the End of the World: How the Most Controversial Book in the Bible Changed the Course of Western Civilization. HarperOne (2006).
- The Grand Inquisitor's Manual: A History of Terror in the Name of God HarperOne (2008).
- The Short, Strange Life of Herschel Grynszpan: A Boy Avenger, a Nazi Diplomat, and a Murder in Paris Liveright (2013).
