= Carolyn Slaughter =

American novelist

- Born: January 7, 1946 (age 80); New Delhi, India
- Education: Thomas Edison State College; Rutgers University
- Occupations: Author, psychotherapist
- Spouse: Kemp Battle
- Writing career
- Notable works: The Story of the Weasel; Before the Knife; The Black Englishman
- Notable awards: Geoffrey Faber Memorial Prize (1977)

Carolyn Slaughter (born 7 January 1946) is an English author based in the United States. Her first novel The Story of the Weasel won the Geoffrey Faber Memorial Prize in 1977, given to authors under the age of 40.

== Life ==
Born in New Delhi, her father was a member of the Indian Imperial Police. The family left India in 1947 during the Partition and moved to Swaziland. Her father was then in the Colonial Service and they were posted to a remote area of the Kalahari Desert in what is now Botswana where she spent most of her childhood. As a teenager she boarded at St Mary's School, Johannesburg. The family left Africa in 1961 and moved to London, where Carolyn later worked as an advertising copywriter. Whilst working at Doubleday she met and married Kemp Battle, an American and moved to the United States in 1986. Now divorced she works as a psychotherapist in Lawrenceville, New Jersey having received a degree in Psychology from Thomas Edison State College and an MSW from Rutgers University in 2003. She lives in an 1860 Second Empire house which she believes to be haunted by a 'blue ghost'.

=== Before the Knife ===
In an article she wrote for The Guardian she recalls that how after writing nine novels in 12 years, all about violence and murder she stopped writing and went 'cold turkey' to try and work out what was driving her. At a writers conference in 1990 repressed memories of sexual abuse at the hands of her father started to manifest. She eventually wrote the story of her childhood in her memoir Before the Knife, published in 2002.

=== The Black Englishman ===
A further family secret was revealed when she discovered that her maternal grandmother whom she had never met had been incarcerated in mental institutions since 1936. Carolyn found she was now in an asylum in Ealing and went to visit her only to find there was nothing wrong with her except she had become institutionalised. A novelisation of her life The Black Englishman was published in 2004.

== Bibliography ==
=== Fiction ===
- The Story of the Weasel (1976) (also known as Relations in the US)
- Columba (1977)
- Magdalene (1978)
- Dreams of the Kalahari (1981)
- Heart of the River (1982)
- The Banquet (1983)
- A Perfect Woman (1984)
- The Innocents (1986)
- The Widow (1989)
- A Black Englishman (2004)
- Dresden, Tennessee (2007)

=== Non-fiction ===
- Before the Knife: Memories of an African Childhood (2002)
