= We Live Here Now =

2025 book

- Author: C.D. Rose
- Language: English
- Publisher: Melville House Publishing
- Publication date: August 5, 2025
- Publication place: United States
- Pages: 320
- ISBN: 978-1685892012

We Live Here Now is a 2025 composite novel by British author C.D. Rose.

== Summary ==
The book consists of fourteen short stories, all centering around the experimental artist Sigismunda Conrad and a mysterious exhibition of hers.

== Themes and analysis ==
In an interview with The New Statesman, Rose denied that the book was "art world satire."

== Reception ==
=== Critical reception ===
Ian Mond of Locus noted the book's "kaleidoscope of surrealism and artistic eccentricity," saying that it "gleefully, cheekily, playfully pokes fun at the contemporary art world." Chris Power of The Observer gave the book a positive review, saying that "perhaps a book about a work of art that swallows those who experience it can only really live up to its promise if it does the same to its readers. When I think about it, though, I realise that sometimes, lost in its fitfully brilliant pages, that’s exactly what happened to me," additionally praising Rose for being "very funny; he is able to acknowledge absurdity without puncturing the novel’s menacing atmosphere." John Self of The Daily Telegraph gave the book five stars out of five, saying that "here is a book that shows it is possible for a novel to be at once highly original and to fit within an established tradition," additionally praising it for being "both accessible and challenging, entertaining the reader with its ridiculous and sinister figures, even as it prompts more intellectual questions about the reality of appearances."

Nicole Rudick of The New York Times gave the book a more negative review, saying that it was "too clever by half: so unironically heaped with jargon, theory and name-dropping that, like its characters, the reader never quite understands what anyone is saying."

=== Awards and recognition ===
The book was awarded the 2025 Goldsmiths Prize.
