= Parade (novel) =

2024 novel by Rachel Cusk

- First edition cover
- Author: Rachel Cusk
- Audio read by: Genevieve Gaunt
- Language: English
- Publisher: Faber & Faber
- Publication date: 6 June 2024
- Publication place: London
- Pages: 208
- ISBN: 9780571377947

Parade is a 2024 novel by Rachel Cusk. It won the 2024 Goldsmiths Prize.

== Plot ==
Parade has four chapters, of roughly equal length. These are titled "The Stuntman", "The Midwife", "The Diver", and "The Spy". These chapters are connected by an unnamed narrator who visits art exhibitions in Europe and ponders the lives and works of a varied group of artists who are all referred to in the novel by the same initial, "G.” These include a male figurative painter whose career breakthrough involves painting his subjects upside-down (evoking George Baselitz), and a Black American abstract painter whose life and work resemble those of Norman Lewis. The novel concludes at a museum exhibition of a “virtually anonymous” painter—not a “G.”—who corresponds to Jacobus Vrel.

== Reception ==
Patricia Zohn, writing for Air Mail, said even "fans" of Cusk would "be daunted" by the novel. Dwight Garner referred to the novel as "skippable for all but [Cusk's] most devoted tier of readers".
