= Big Kiss, Bye-Bye =

2025 novel by Claire-Louise Bennett

- Author: Claire-Louise Bennett
- Language: English
- Publisher: Fitzcarraldo Editions (UK), Riverhead (US)
- Publication date: 9 October 2025
- Publication place: United Kingdom, United States
- Media type: Print
- Pages: 168
- ISBN: 9781804271933
- Preceded by: Checkout 19

Big Kiss, Bye-Bye is a novel by Claire-Louise Bennett. It is Bennett’s second novel and third book. It was selected as one of The New Yorker’s best books of 2025. It tells the story of a writer who moves from the city to the countryside after her longtime affair with a much older man.

== Reception ==
Big Kiss, Bye-Bye was reviewed by The New York Times book review, The Atlantic, and Financial Times.
