= Pond (book) =

2015 book by Claire-Louise Bennett

- First edition
- Author: Claire-Louise Bennett
- Language: English
- Genre: Anthology, Psychological Fiction
- Publisher: The Stinging Fly Press
- Publication date: 10 May 2015
- Publication place: United Kingdom, United States
- Media type: Print (hardcover & paperback)
- ISBN: 0-3995-7590-1

Pond is a collection of 20 short stories written by Claire-Louise Bennett, originally published by The Stinging Fly Press in Ireland on 10 May 2015 (ISBN 0-3995-7590-1). The stories are written from the perspective of an unnamed woman who lives a solitary existence on the outskirts of a small coastal village.

It focuses on the details of her daily experience, from the best way to eat porridge to an encounter with a cow to the ending of an affair. The shortest story in Pond runs to only a couple of sentences.

== Reception ==
Pond was well received in both the UK and the US, and was featured in both The New Yorker and The New York Times in 2016.

== Stories ==
№	Title |
1	"Voyage in the Dark"
2	"Morning, Noon & Night"
3	"First Thing"
4	"The Big Day"
5	"Wishful Thinking"
6	"A Little Before Seven"
7	"To A God Unknown"
8	"Two Weeks Since"
9	"Stir-fry"
10	"Finishing Touch"
11	"Control Knobs"
12	"Postcard"
13	"The Deepest Sea"
14	"Oh, Tomato Puree!"
15	"Morning, 1908"
16	"The Gloves Are Off"
17	"Over & Done With"
18	"Words Escape Me"
19	"Lady of the House"
20	"Old Ground"
