= Eimear McBride =

Irish novelist

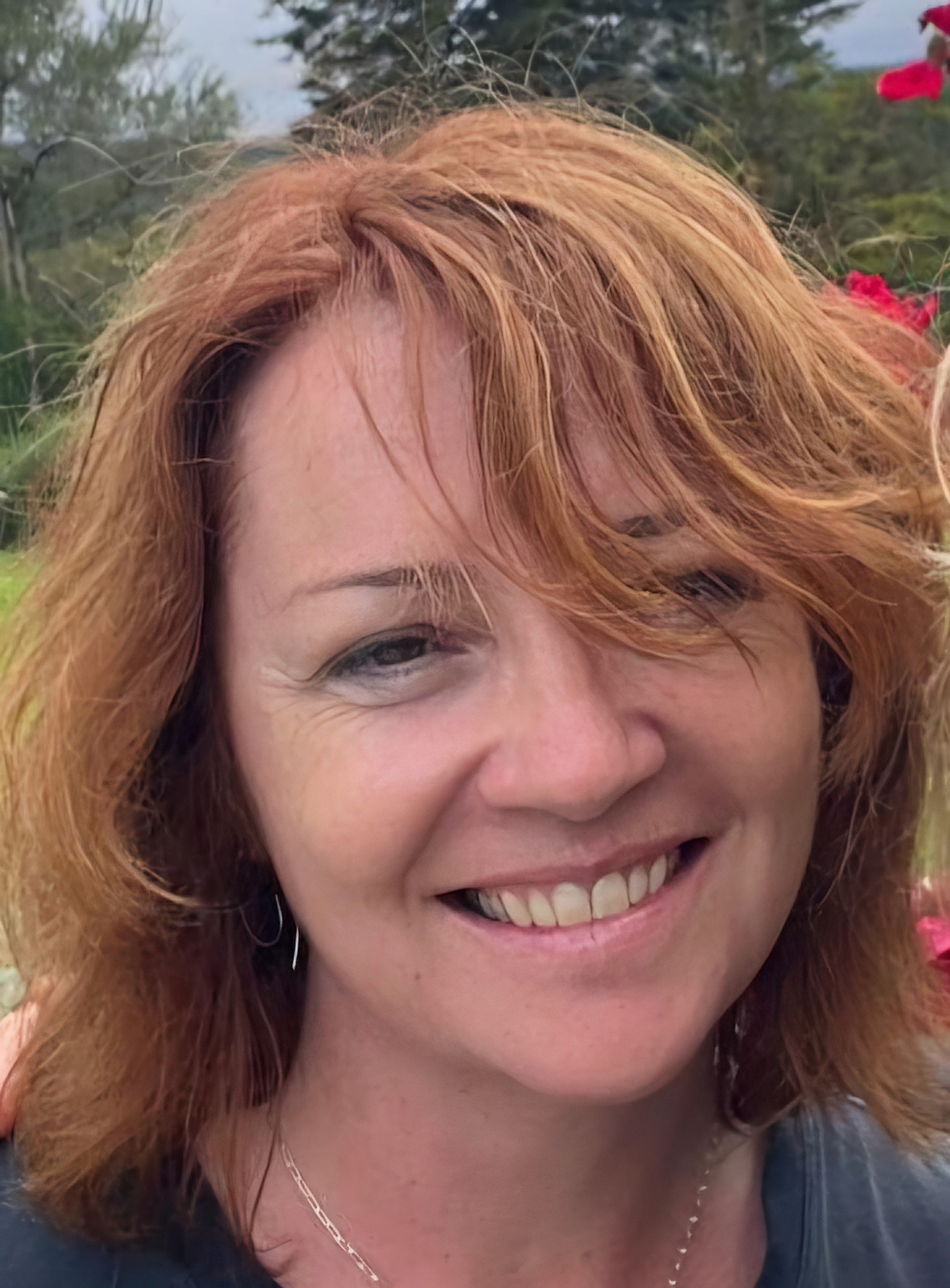
McBride in 2024

Eimear McBride (born 6 October 1976) is an Irish novelist. Her debut novel, A Girl Is a Half-formed Thing, won the inaugural Goldsmiths Prize in 2013 and the 2014 Baileys Women's Prize for Fiction. She was elected a Fellow of the Royal Society of Literature in 2018.

== Published works ==
McBride wrote A Girl Is a Half-formed Thing in six months, but it took nine years until Galley Beggar Press of Norwich finally picked it up in 2013. The novel is written in a stream of consciousness narrative mode and recounts the story of a young woman's complex relationship with her family.

McBride's second novel The Lesser Bohemians was published on 1 September 2016. Set in Camden Town in the 1990s, it tells the story of the turbulent relationship between an 18-year-old drama student and a 38-year-old actor. McBride discussed the book on Woman's Hour on 8 September and it was reviewed on BBC Radio 4's programme Saturday Review on 17 September.

Her third novel, Strange Hotel was published in February 2020. McBride's first non-fiction work Something Out of Place: Women and Disgust was published in 2021.

McBride's fourth novel, The City Changes its Face, was published in February 2025.

She has contributed forewords to the Selected Poems of Anna Akhmatova (Folio Society), Sundog: the lyrics of Scott Walker (Faber & Faber) and Edna O'Brien's The Country Girls Trilogy (Faber/ FSG). Her short stories have appeared in The Guardian, Prospect magazine, The Long Gaze Back (Little Island Press), Dubliners 100 (Tramp Press), Winter Papers (Curlew Editions) and on BBC Radio 4.

== Other work ==
In 2017, McBride was awarded the inaugural Creative Fellowship of the Beckett Research Centre, University of Reading. The fellowship resulted in Mouthpieces, a collection of three performance texts published in 2021.

In 2022, McBride wrote and directed A Very Short Film About Longing. The film was screened at the 2023 BFI London Film Festival. It starred Joe Alwyn, Natalia Kostrzewa and Lashay Anderson and was soundtracked by Tindersticks.

== Personal life ==
McBride was born in Liverpool in 1976 to Irish parents, both of whom were nurses. The family moved back to Ireland when she was three. She spent her childhood in Tubbercurry in County Sligo and Castlebar, County Mayo. She recalled writing from the age of seven or eight. At the age of 17, McBride moved to London to begin her studies at The Drama Centre, but realised after graduating that she had no interest in becoming an actress.

McBride has a love for Russian literature and spent four months in Saint Petersburg in 2000. On her return, she worked as an office temp and travelled. She completed her first novel during this time. In 2006, she returned to Cork for a time and began work on her second novel. McBride moved to London in 2017 with her husband and daughter after spending several years living in Norwich.

== Selected works ==
=== Fiction ===
- A Girl Is a Half-formed Thing (Galley Beggar Press, 2013).
- The Lesser Bohemians (Faber and Faber, 2016)
- Strange Hotel (Faber and Faber, 2020)
- Mouthpieces (Faber and Faber, 2021)
- The City Changes Its Face (Faber and Faber, 2025)

=== Non-Fiction ===
- Something Out of Place: Women and Disgust (Profile / Wellcome Collection, 2021)

== Awards and honours ==
- 2017 James Tait Black Memorial Prize winner for The Lesser Bohemians
- 2016 Goldsmiths Prize shortlist for The Lesser Bohemians
- 2014 Desmond Elliott Prize (for debut novelists) winner for A Girl Is a Half-formed Thing
- 2014 Kerry Group Irish Fiction Award winner for A Girl Is a Half-formed Thing
- 2014 Baileys Women's Prize for Fiction winner for A Girl Is a Half-formed Thing
- 2014 Folio Prize shortlist for A Girl Is a Half-formed Thing
- 2013 Geoffrey Faber Memorial Prize winner for A Girl Is a Half-formed Thing
- 2013 Goldsmiths Prize winner for A Girl Is a Half-formed Thing
