= Arja Kajermo =

Cartoonist

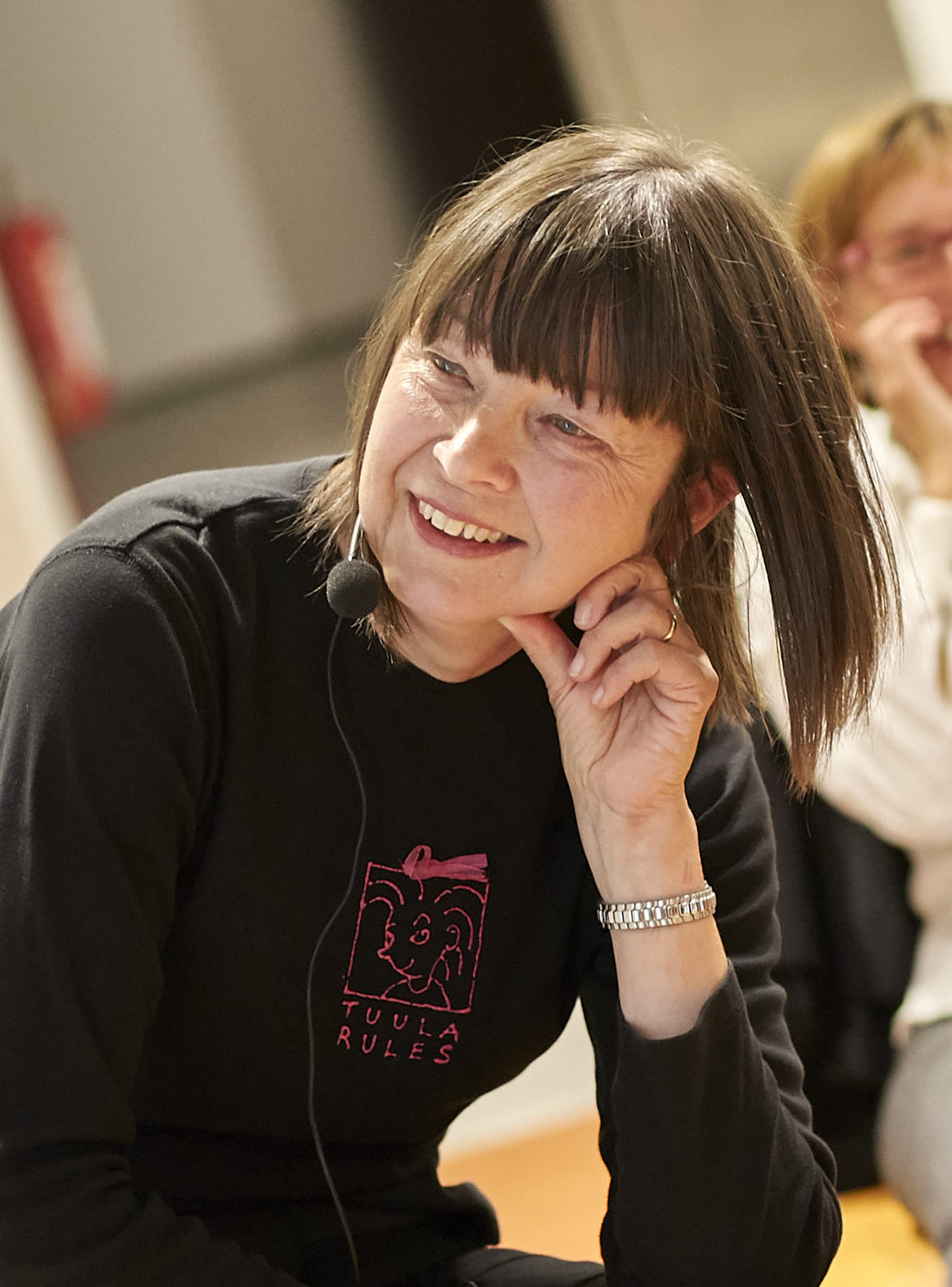
Arja Kajermo, 2010

Arja Kajermo is a cartoonist, born in Finland, raised in Sweden, currently residing in Ireland.

== Life ==
=== Early life ===
Kajermo was born in Kiuruvesi, Northern Savonia, where her family had a small farm. They moved to Stockholm in 1955, when she was six years old. Kajermo moved to Dublin originally as an au pair in the 1970s.

=== Career and publications ===
Kajermo started working as a cartoonist for the magazine In Dublin. She drew a fortnightly strip for In Dublin for ten years. Her first book of cartoons, The Dirty Dublin Strip Cartoons (Poolbeg Press), was based on these strips.

She contributed cartoons to the feminist publisher Attic Press and occasionally to The Sunday Press (now gone), The Irish Times, Image magazine, Magill and others. Her strip Dublin Four ran in the Sunday Tribune.

She also draws the strip Tuula in the Sunday edition of Swedish daily newspaper Dagens Nyheter.

The Tuula strip was turned into a book, En pillig sol i Särholmen (Nisses Böcker 2005). It is a light-hearted look at daily life in a suburb south of Stockholm. A second book, Tuula-underbar, underbetald undersköterska (Nisses Böcker 2008), expanded the subject matter to expectations, class, culture, cliché and gender.

Some of the books illustrated by Arja Kajermo include the children's book Address Vintergatan (Almqvist&Wiksell, 2003), Hämta kraft (UR, 2008) by Annamaria Dahlöf about stress in the workplace, and Get Through (Royal Society of Medicine Press, 2008) by Bruno Rushforth and Val Wass, dealing with MRCGP Clinical Skills Assessment.

Arja Kajermo's debut novel The Iron Age was published by Tramp Press 2017. The novel with illustrations throughout by Susanna Kajermo Törner grew out of a story shortlisted for the Davy Byrne's Short Story Award 2014. It is partly based on Kajermo's own childhood in post-war Finland and Sweden. The Iron Age was longlisted for the Republic of Consciousness Prize and was one of 20 on the Walter Scott Prize recommended reads (2018)
