= Michael Magee (writer) =

Writer from Ireland (born 1990)

- Born: May 1990 (age 36)
- Education: Liverpool John Moores University; Queen's University Belfast (PhD)
- Occupation: Writer
- Writing career
- Notable awards: Rooney Prize for Irish Literature (2023); Nero Book Award (2023)

Michael Magee (born May 1990), also known as Michael Nolan, is an Irish writer.

His first novel, Close to Home, won the Rooney Prize for Irish Literature, was a category winner in the Nero Book Awards, and was the Waterstones Irish Book of the Year.

== Early life and education ==
Magee was born in May 1990 in a republican family and grew up in Poleglass, on the edge of west Belfast. He attended the Christian Brothers school at Andersonstown "sporadically", but went on to study at Liverpool John Moores University and earn a PhD in creative writing at Queen's University Belfast.

== Writing career ==
Magee's first novel, Close to Home (2023), won the 2023 Rooney Prize for Irish Literature, was category winner for debut fiction in the 2023 Nero Book Awards, was the Waterstones Irish Book of the Year, and winner of the John McGahern Prize. The Guardian's reviewer described it as "a staggeringly humane and tender evocation of class, violence and the challenge of belonging in a world that seems designed to keep you watching from the sidelines.", and a representative of Waterstones said that it was "the unanimous choice for Irish Book of the Year by all the booksellers in Ireland, north and south". The publishers, Hamish Hamilton, have also bought the rights to Magee's second novel.

Magee has been published in Winter Papers, The Stinging Fly and The 32: An Anthology of Irish Working-Class Voices (2021, Unbound: ISBN 978-1800180246), In 2014, he published an ebook novella The Blame, under the name Michael Nolan.

He is the fiction editor of The Tangerine, a Belfast literary magazine, and was one of the team which launched it in 2016.

== Selected publications ==
=== Long fiction ===
- Nolan, Michael (2014). The Blame (ebook ed.). Salt Publishing. ISBN 9781784630041.
- Magee, Michael (2023). Close to Home (hardcover 1st ed.). London: Hamish Hamilton, an imprint of Penguin Books. ISBN 9780241582978.

=== Short stories and essays ===
- Magee, Michael (2014). "Bottles". The Stinging Fly. 29 (2).
- Magee, Michael (2017). "Rustlers". The Stinging Fly. 36 (2).
- Magee, Michael. "Mostly Full Coverage". In Connolly, Stephen (ed.). The World Was All Before Them. Lifeboat Press. ISBN 9781916222878.
