= Amy Arnold =

British author

- Born: Amy Catherine Smith; 6 October 1974 (age 51); Oxford, UK
- Occupation: Novelist
- Notable work: Slip of a Fish
- Website: amy-arnold-writer.com

Amy Arnold (born 6 October 1974) is a British novelist. Her debut novel won the Northern Book Prize. She has been shortlisted for the James Tait Black Memorial Prize and twice for the Goldsmiths Prize.

== Life ==
Arnold was born in Oxford in 1974. She has degrees in psychology and music and studied postgraduate neuropsychology at Birmingham University. She has worked as a lecturer and teacher and in other jobs including packing swedes. She lives in Cumbria.

== Writing career ==
Arnold's unpublished debut novel, Slip of a Fish, was awarded the inaugural Northern Book Prize in 2018. The prize was set up by Sheffield publisher And Other Stories for unpublished book-length fiction or literary non-fiction by northern English writers or with a strong northern English connection. Slip of a Fish was published by And Other Stories in the same year. Narrated in a stream of consciousness style by a vulnerable woman, Ash, it details her increasing withdrawal from reality. "Slip of a fish" is a phrase used by Ash to describe her daughter, Charlie, whom she takes swimming in a lake where swimming is prohibited. Stevie Davies, writing in The Guardian, described the novel as ambitious and remarkably original but noted that its ambiguity could leave the reader floundering. In 2019, it was shortlisted for the Goldsmiths Prize.

Arnold's second novel, Lori & Joe, was published in 2023. Again written in a stream-of-consciousness style, it follows Lori's thoughts after she finds husband Joe dead, revealing the history of their marriage as she takes a day-long walk in the hills. It gave Arnold her second shortlisting for the Goldsmiths Prize. It was also shortlisted for the 2024 James Tait Black Memorial Prize.

== Works ==
- 2018 Slip of a Fish. And Other Stories, UK. ISBN 9781911508526
- 2023 Lori & Joe. Prototype Publishing, UK. ISBN 9781913513399

== Awards ==
- (2018) Northern Book Prize (won)
- (2019) Goldsmiths Prize (shortlisted)
- (2023) Goldsmiths Prize (shortlisted)
- (2024) James Tait Black Memorial Prize (shortlisted)
