= Sophie White =

Irish writer and podcaster

- Born: 1985 (age 40–41); Dublin, Ireland
- Education: National College of Art and Design
- Occupations: Author, journalist, podcaster
- Notable work: Corpsing, Where I End, Mother of Pod, The Creep Dive
- Parent(s): Mary O'Sullivan, Kevin Linehan
- Awards: Shirley Jackson Award for Novel (2022)

Sophie White (born 1985) is an Irish author, journalist and podcaster. She is the co-host of the podcasts Mother of Pod and The Creep Dive.

== Early life ==
White is from Dublin and studied Sculpture at National College of Art and Design. She is the daughter of Sunday Independent columnist and features editor Mary O'Sullivan and Kevin Linehan, who was head of entertainment for RTÉ. White's writing deals with themes of motherhood, mental illness, addiction and feminism. She has spoken about how taking a pill at Electric Picnic in 2007 triggered a significant psychological episode and how she was committed to the St John of God facility in Dublin.

== Podcasting ==
White co-hosts Mother of Pod with Jen O'Dwyer, which takes a candid and irreverent look at motherhood and The Creep Dive, which takes an in-depth look at the stories behind a provocative "clickbait" headline.

== Awards ==
Corpsing was nominated for an Irish Book Award and the Michel Déon Prize for non-fiction. Where I End won the Shirley Jackson Award for Novel of 2022.

== List of novels and memoirs ==
=== Novels ===
- Filter This (Hachette, 2019)
- Unfiltered (Hachette, 2020)
- The Snag List (Hachette, 2022)
- Where I End (Tramp Press, 2022)
- My Hot Friend (Hachette, 2023)
- Such A Good Couple (Hachette, 2025)

=== Memoirs ===
- Recipes for a Nervous Breakdown (Gill, 2016)
- Corpsing (Tramp Press, 2021)
