= Charlotte Riddell =

Irish-born fiction writer (1832–1906)

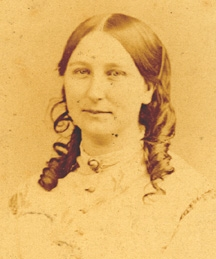
- Charlotte Riddell in 1875
- Born: Charlotte Eliza Lawson Cowan; 30 September 1832; Carrickfergus, County Antrim, Ireland
- Died: 24 September 1906 (aged 73); Ashford, Kent, England
- Spouse: Joseph Hadley Riddell (m. 1857; died 1880)
- Writing career
- Period: Victorian
- Genres: Novel, ghost story

Charlotte Eliza Lawson Riddell (nee Cowan; 30 September 1832 – 24 September 1906), known also as Mrs J. H. Riddell, and by her pen name F. G. Trafford, was a popular and influential Irish-born writer in the Victorian period. She was the author of 56 books, novels and short stories, and also became part-owner and editor of St. James's Magazine, a prominent London literary journal in the 1860s.

== Biography ==
Charlotte Riddell aged 60

Born Charlotte Eliza Lawson Cowan in Carrickfergus, County Antrim, Ireland, on 30 September 1832, Riddell was the youngest daughter of James Cowan of Carrickfergus, High Sheriff for the County of Antrim, and Ellen Kilshaw of Liverpool, England.

In the winter of 1855, four years after her father's death, she and her mother moved to London. The following year her mother died.

In 1857, she married Joseph Hadley Riddell, a civil engineer, originally from Staffordshire but residing in London. It is known they moved to live in St John's Lodge between Harringay and West Green in the mid-1860s, moving out in 1873 as the area was being built up. There were no children of the marriage.

Her first novel, The Moors and the Fens, appeared in 1858. She issued it under the pseudonym of F. G. Trafford, which she only abandoned for her own name in 1864.

Novels and tales followed in quick succession, and between 1858 and 1902 she issued thirty volumes. The most notable is perhaps George Geith of Fen Court, by F. G. Trafford (1864; other editions 1865, 1886), for which Tinsley paid her £800. It was dramatised in 1883 by Wybert Reeve, was produced at Scarborough, and was afterwards played in Australia.

From 1867, Mrs. Riddell was co-proprietor and editor of the St. James's Magazine, which had been started in 1861 under Mrs S. C. Hall. She also edited a magazine called Home in the 1860s, and wrote short tales for the Society for the Promotion of Christian Knowledge and Routledge's Christmas annuals. Her short stories were less successful than her novels.

Riddell was also prominent as a writer of ghost stories. Five of her novels—Fairy Water, The Uninhabited House, The Haunted River, The Disappearance of Mr. Jeremiah Redworth and The Nun's Curse—deal with buildings blighted by supernatural phenomena. Riddell also wrote several shorter ghost stories, such as "The Open Door" and "Nut Bush Farm". These were collected into the volume Weird Stories.

Her husband died in 1880. After 1886, she lived in seclusion at Upper Halliford, Middlesex. She was the first pensioner of the Society of Authors, receiving a pension of £60 a year in May 1901. She died from cancer in Ashford, Kent, on 24 September 1906.

== Assessment ==
Mrs. Riddell, by making commerce the theme of many of her novels, introduced a new element into English fiction, although Balzac had naturalised it in the French novel. She was intimately acquainted with the topography of the City of London, where the scenes of her novels were often laid. At the same time she possessed a rare power of describing places of which she had no first-hand knowledge. When she wrote The Moors and the Fens she had never seen the district.

== Works ==
Her publications included:

=== Novels ===
Cover of The Uninhabited House

- Zuriel's Grandchild (1856)
- The Ruling Passion (1857)
- The Moors and the Fens (1857)
- The Rich Husband (1858)
- Too Much Alone (1860)
- City and Suburb (1861)
- The World in Church (1862)
- George Geith of Fen Court (1864)
- Maxwell Drewitt (1865)
- Phemie Keller (1866)
- The Race for Wealth (1866)
- Far Above Rubies (1867)
- My First Love (1869)
- Austin Friars (1870)
- Long Ago (1870)
- A Life's Assize (1871)
- How to Spend a Month in Ireland (1872)
- The Earl's Promise (1873)
- Home, Sweet Home (1873)
- Fairy Water (1873)
- Mortomley's Estate (1874)
- The Haunted House at Latchford (also Fairy Water) (1872)
- The Uninhabited House (1875)
- Above Suspicion (1876)
- The Haunted River (1877)
- Her Mother's Darling (1877)
- The Disappearance of Jeremiah Redworth (1878)
- The Mystery in Palace Gardens (1880)
- Alaric Spenceley (1881)
- The Senior Partner (1881)
- A Struggle for Fame (1883 – republished in 2015 by Tramp Press)
- Susan Drummond (1884)
- Berna Boyle: A Love Story of the County Down (1884)
- Mitre Court (1885)
- The Government Official (1887)
- The Nun's Curse (1888)
- The Head of the Firm (1892)
- Daisies and Buttercups (c. 1900)

=== Collections ===
- Frank Sinclair's Wife: And Other Stories (1874)
- Weird Stories (1882)
- Idle Tales (1887)
- Princess Sunshine: And Other Stories (1889)
- The Banshee's Warning And Other Tales (1894)
- Handsome Phil: And Other Stories (1899)
- The Collected Ghost Stories of Mrs J. H. Riddell (1977)
- A Little Purple Book of Sharp Wit (2022)

=== Anthologies containing Riddell stories ===
- The 7th Fontana Book of Great Ghost Stories (1971)
- Victorian Tales of Terror (1972)
- The Penguin Book of Classic Fantasy by Women (1977)
- Gaslit Nightmares (1988)
- 100 Ghastly Little Ghost Stories (1992)
- 12 Tales of the Supernatural (1997)
- The Mammoth Book of Haunted House Stories (2000)
- The Phantom of the Opera and Other Gothic Tales (2018)
- Ghost Stories : Classic Tales of Horror and Suspense (2019)
- The Wimbourne Book of Victorian Ghost Stories: Volume 7 (2020)
- Dark Tales in Winter (2021)

=== Short stories ===
- "Banshee's Warning" (1867)
- "Hertford O'Donnell's Warning" (1867)
- "A Strange Christmas Game" (1868)
- "Forewarned, Forearmed" (1874)
- "The De Grabrooke Monument" (1879)
- "Nut Bush Farm" (1882)
- "The Old House in Vauxhall Walk" (1882)
- "Old Mrs Jones" (1882)
- '"The Open Door" (1882)
- "Sandy the Tinker" (1882)
- "Walnut-Tree House" (1882)
- "The Last of Squire Ennismore" (1888)
- "A Terrible Vengeance" (1889)
- "Why Dr Cray Left Southam" (1889)
- "Conn Kilrea" (1899)
- "The Rusty Sword" (1893)
- "Diarmid Chittock's Story" (1899)
- "Handsome Phil" (1899)
