= Clouded Reveries =

2022 film

- Directed by: Ciara Nic Chormaic
- Release date: 7 July 2022 (GFF)
- Running time: 72 minutes
- Country: Ireland
- Languages: English; Irish

Clouded Reveries is a 2022 Irish biographical film about Irish writer Doireann Ní Ghríofa.

Aisling Trí Néallaibh: Clouded Reveries is about poet and essayist Ní Ghríofa’s world and creative process.

This film was funded by The Arts Council (Ireland) and TG4.
