= John Noone =

British writer (1936–2025)

John Noone (7 February 1936 – 12 June 2025) was a British writer.

== Life and career ==
Noone was born in Darlington, County Durham on 7 February 1936, into a family of mixed Irish-Scots heritage. He graduated from King's College, Newcastle. He served in the Suez Canal Zone as part of his National Service and returned to Egypt in 1961 to teach at Alexandria University. Later, he also lived and worked in Libya, Japan and France.

His first novel The Man with the Chocolate Egg won the Geoffrey Faber Memorial Prize in 1967. His second novel The Night of Accomplishment was also well-received. His short stories have been collected in the volume Like As Not. He was known for two other specialist works: The Man Behind the Iron Mask (first published in 1988 and revised several times thereafter), and Turtle Tortoise, Image and Symbol.

Noone died on 12 June 2025, at the age of 89.
