= Keith Ridgway =

Irish novelist

- Born: Dublin, Ireland
- Occupation: Novelist
- Notable work: The Long Falling (1987), Hawthorn & Child (2012), A Shock (2021)

Keith Ridgway (born 2 October 1965) is an Irish novelist and short story writer. He has won the Rooney Prize for Irish Literature, the Prix Femina Etranger, the Prix du Premier Roman Etranger, the O. Henry Award, and the James Tait Black Memorial Prize.

== Life ==
Ridgway was born in 1965 in Dublin. He has lived in London and Dublin and currently lives in south London. He has described himself as a queer, Irish, male writer and has said he is "a Dubliner for life".

== Career ==
Ridgway's novella, Horses, was included in volume 13 of the Faber First Fictions series in 1997.

In 1998, Ridgway's debut novel, The Long Falling, was published by Faber & Faber, London. Set in rural Ireland and Dublin, it tells of a woman in an abusive relationship and of her gay son who moves to Dublin. The French translation, Mauvaise Pente, was published in 2001. It won the Prix Femina Étranger and the Prix du Premier Roman Etranger. It was adapted into a film, Où va la nuit, by French director Martin Provost in 2011.

A collection of short fiction, Standard Time, was published by Faber & Faber in 2001. It was translated into French, German, and Dutch and won the Rooney Prize for Irish Literature.

Ridgway's second novel, The Parts, was published by Faber & Faber in 2003. Set in a contemporary, cosmopolitan Dublin, particularly the "underbelly" of the city, it tells the interconnecting stories of six main characters.

His next novel, Animals, a story of mental breakdown set in London, was published by 4th Estate, London, in 2006.

Ridgway's short story, 'Goo Book', was published in the April 11, 2011, issue of The New Yorker magazine. In the same year, his short story, 'Rothko Eggs', was published in Zoetrope: All Story. It won the O. Henry Award in 2012 and was anthologized in the PEN/O. Henry Prize Stories that year.

Both these stories later became part of Ridgway's third novel, Hawthorn & Child, published by Granta Books in 2012. An "out of sync" detective story without a resolution, the novel features two London detectives and also tells the stories of several characters loosely associated with the case they are investigating.

After an eight year gap, Ridgway's fourth novel, A Shock, was published by Picador in June 2021. Set in a hot summer in south London, once again, the novel features multiple interconnecting characters and stories. It was shortlisted for the Goldsmiths Prize and it won the James Tait Black Memorial Prize.

Ridgway's next novel, Dooneen, was published in June 2026 by Fitzcarraldo Editions in the United Kingdom.

Ridgway's novels have been translated into several languages and have been published in France, Italy, and Germany.

== Awards ==
=== Honours ===
- 2001 Prix du Premier Roman Etranger
- 2012 O. Henry Award

=== Literary awards ===
Year	Title	Award	Category	Result	Ref.
1998	The Long Falling	Lambda Literary Award	Gay Men's Fiction	Shortlisted	
1999	The Long Falling	Ferro-Grumley Award	—	Finalist	
2001	The Long Falling	Prix Femina	Étranger	Won	
2001	Standard Time	Rooney Prize for Irish Literature	—	Won	
2012	Hawthorn and Child	Green Carnation Prize	—	Longlisted	
2012	Hawthorn and Child	Irish Book Awards	Novel	Shortlisted	
2013	Hawthorn and Child	Believer Book Award	—	Shortlisted	
2021	A Shock	Goldsmiths Prize	—	Shortlisted	
2021	A Shock	James Tait Black Memorial Prize	Fiction	Won	
2026	Dooneen	Goldsmiths Prize	—	Shortlisted	

== Bibliography ==
- Horses in First Fictions: Introduction 13, Faber & Faber, 1997. ISBN 978-0571190096. Republished as a standalone volume, Horses, Faber & Faber, 2003. ISBN 978-0571216451
- The Long Falling, Faber & Faber, 1998. ISBN 978-0571216451
- Standard Time, Faber & Faber, 2001. ISBN 978-0571205882
- The Parts, Faber & Faber, 2003. ISBN 978-0571215713
- Animals, 4th Estate, 2006. ISBN 978-0007213337
- Hawthorn & Child, Granta, 2012. ISBN 978-1847085269
- A Shock, Picador, 2021. ISBN 978-1529064797
- Dooneen, Fitzcarraldo Editions, 2026. ISBN 9781804272459
