= The Story of the Weasel =

Book by Carolyn Slaughter

- Panther 1977 UK edition
- Author: Carolyn Slaughter
- Language: English
- Publisher: Hart-Davis, MacGibbon (UK); Mason-Charter (US)
- Publication date: 1976 (UK) 1977 (US)
- Publication place: United Kingdom
- Media type: Print
- Pages: 256
- ISBN: 0-246-10887-8

The Story of the Weasel (published 1976) is the first published novel of Carolyn Slaughter. It won the Geoffrey Faber Memorial Prize the following year. Published as Relations in the United States, it has been praised for its 'sensitive treatment of fraternal incest in Victorian England and for its subtle poetic prose'.

== Plot introduction ==
The frame story is set in 1900 Cirencester as 30-year-old Catherine Roach is writing the story of her childhood in 1880s Wandsworth, when at the age of ten she and her brother Christopher, two years her senior, discover their late father's collection of pornography. Prompted by the discovery the siblings then start a sexual relationship which lasts for three years; coming to an end on a holiday in Cornwall after which Christopher leaves home; eventually emigrating to South Africa. Catherine writes the story in order to come to terms with the damage the relationship caused her and her brother.

== Reception ==
- Peggy Barber in The Daily News writes 'Slaughter's portrayal of incest as beautiful and innocent is convincing - no easy task. For it's only when the taboo is forced upon Catherine's consciousness that the possibility of evil enters her mind and incest exacts a strong penalty.
- The back cover of the 1977 Panther Books edition quotes a number of reviews including:-
  - The Observer : 'A highly charged, intense and powerful story, with an eroticism which...comes from unspoken tremors as much as from what is made explicit...skilfully moving'
  - Sunday Times: 'Impressively accomplished first novel... The style is perfectly suited'
  - Sunday Telegraph: This strange little gothic tale, with its episodes of sadism, madness and self-mutilation, shows a genuine originality'
