= Vesna Main =

Croatian-English novelist nominated for Goldsmiths Prize

Vesna Main (born Zagreb, Croatia) is a UK-based novelist, short-story writer, and Goldsmiths Prize nominee (shortlist).

== Biography ==
Vesna Main was born in Zagreb, Croatia, and later moved to Britain, where she has lived for much of her life. She holds a BA in Comparative Literature, an MA in Shakespeare Studies and a PhD in Elizabethan Drama from the Shakespeare Institute, University of Birmingham. Before turning to full-time fiction writing, she taught literature at universities in the UK and Nigeria and worked for the BBC. As of recent years she divides her time between London (UK) and a small village in Poitou-Charentes, France.

== Career ==
Her short story collection Temptation: A User’s Guide (Salt, 2018) followed earlier publications and cemented her reputation for sharp, unconventional writing. Her novel Good Day? (Salt, 2019) is told entirely in dialogue and was shortlisted for the Goldsmiths Prize in 2019. Her most recent novel Waiting for a Party (Salt, 2024) was published to positive critical reception.

== Awards and honours ==
- Shortlisted for the Goldsmiths Prize (2019) for Good Day?

== Selected works ==
- Temptation: A User’s Guide (Salt Publishing, 2018)
- Good Day? (Salt Publishing, 2019) — shortlisted for the Goldsmiths Prize.
- Only A Lodger… And Hardly That (Seagull Books, 2020)
- Waiting for a Party (Salt Publishing, 2024)

== Reception and critical commentary ==
Her most recent novel Waiting for a Party has been described as “surprising and refreshing … a vivid exploration of late female longing and desire” in The Irish Times. A review in The TLS commented that the novel invites reconsideration of what constitutes a life-well-lived, as the ninety-two-year-old protagonist re-evaluates marriage, friendship and sexuality.
