= Will Eaves =

British writer, poet, and professor (born 1967)

Will Eaves FRSL
- Born: 1967 (age 58–59); Bath, Somerset
- Education: Beechen Cliff School; King's College, Cambridge
- Occupations: Writer, poet, professor
- Writing career
- Genres: Fiction, short stories, science
- Notable awards: Wellcome Book Prize

Will Eaves (born 1967) is a British writer, poet and professor at the University of Warwick.

== Early life ==
Eaves was born in Bath, Somerset. He was educated at Beechen Cliff School before going up to King's College, Cambridge to read English.

== Career ==
Will Eaves was the Arts Editor at The Times Literary Supplement from 1995 to 2011. His most recent novel Murmur – a book about the inner workings of Alan Turing – brought him much critical acclaim. For Murmur, Eaves was shortlisted for the Goldsmiths Prize and won the Wellcome Book Prize. It was only the third novel to win the award for science-related writing.

He was elected a Fellow of the Royal Society of Literature in 2021.

== Bibliography ==
=== Fiction ===
- Will Eaves (2001). The Oversight. Picador.
- Will Eaves (2005). Nothing to Be Afraid Of. Picador.
- Will Eaves (2006). Small Hours. Brockwell Press.
- Will Eaves (2011). Sound Houses. Carcanet Press.
- Will Eaves (2012). This Is Paradise. Picador.
- Will Eaves (2015). The Absent Therapist. Penguin UK.
- Will Eaves (2016). The Inevitable Gift Shop. CB Editions.
- Will Eaves (2018). Murmur. CB Editions.
