= A Shock =

2021 novel by Keith Ridgway

- First edition (US)
- Author: Keith Ridgway
- Language: English
- Published: 2021
- Publisher: New Directions (US); Picador (UK)

A Shock is a 2021 fiction novel written by Irish novelist Keith Ridgway. It was published by Picador in the United Kingdom, and by New Directions Publishing in the United States. It was shortlisted for the inaugural Goldsmiths Prize (2021) and won the James Tait Black Memorial Prize (2021).

== Plot ==
The book follows a group of loosely connected characters appearing, disappearing, and reappearing around contemporary London. The nine chapters are "The Party", "The Camera", The Sweat", "The Joke", "The Story", "The Flat", "The Pigeon", "The Meeting" and "The Song". It has a number of characters that experience different social issues on different levels; sexuality, racism, drugs, class struggle, troubles finding accommodation in a progressively changing city.

== Reception ==
Anthony Cummins in The Guardian wrote: "a plot-driven panorama along the lines of John Lanchester's Capital".
