= Belinda McKeon =

Irish writer (born 1979)

Belinda McKeon (born 1979) is an Irish journalist, novelist, playwright and academic.

She worked as a journalist for The Irish Times from 2000 to 2010, writing on theatre, literature and the arts. She wrote the plays Word of Mouth (2005), Drapes (Dublin, 2006), and Graham and Frost (2010). McKeon published her first novel, Solace, in 2011. This was followed by Tender in 2015. In 2015, McKeon also edited A Kind of Compass: Stories on Distance, a collection of new short stories. In 2022, she became the head of Maynooth University's Master of Arts in Creative Writing, having previously taught creative writing at Rutgers University

McKeon's novel Solace won the 2011 Geoffrey Faber Memorial Prize, while Tender was shortlisted for Novel of the Year at the 2015 Irish Book Awards.

== Life and work ==
McKeon was born in Longford and attended Trinity College, Dublin, and University College, Dublin (UCD). In 2005, she moved to New York City, where she completed an MFA at Columbia University.

From 2000 to 2010 she worked for The Irish Times, writing on theatre, literature and the arts. She was the playwright of Word of Mouth (an RTE radio drama, 2005), Drapes (Dublin, 2006), and Graham and Frost (Irish Theatre Festival, New York, 2010). From 2008 to 2011, she also curated the DLR Poetry Now Festival in Dún Laoghaire, County Dublin, Ireland, and, with her husband Aengus Woods, she has curated the annual Poetry Fest at the Irish Arts Center, New York, since 2009.

McKeon published her first novel, Solace in 2011. This was followed by her second novel Tender in 2015. In 2015, McKeon edited A Kind of Compass: Stories on Distance, a collection of new short stories on the theme of distance by 17 international contemporary writers

In 2022, McKeon became the head of Maynooth University's Master of Arts in Creative Writing. Previously, she was Associate Teaching Professor in Creative Writing at Rutgers University

== Critical reception ==
McKeon's first novel, Solace, won the Geoffrey Faber Memorial Prize and the Sunday Independent Best Newcomer Award and was named Bord Gáis Energy Irish Book of the Year in 2011, as well as being shortlisted for the James Tait Black Memorial Prize. The Economist called Solace "a warm and wise debut", while The Irish Times described it as "at once a moving and gracefully etched story of human loss and interconnection set in contemporary Ireland and a deeply affecting meditation on being in the world".

Her second novel Tender was published in 2015 to critical acclaim. Reviewing it for the Irish Times, author John Boyne called Tender "the best Irish novel I've read since The Spinning Heart, a work rich with wisdom, truth and beauty.", while the Guardian called it "richly nuanced and utterly absorbing." Tender was shortlisted for Novel of the Year at the 2015 Irish Book Awards.

== List of works ==
=== Novels ===
- Solace (Picador, 2011); (Scribner, 2011)
- Tender (Picador, 2015); (Lee Boudreaux, 2016)

=== Plays ===
- Word of Mouth (RTE radio drama, 2005)
- Drapes (part of Fishamble Theatre Company's Whereabouts, Dublin, 2006)
- Two Houses (one of two plays in Love 2.0, a Dublin Fringe Festival production in association with the Abbey Theatre, 2008)
- Graham and Frost (1st Irish Theater Festival, New York, 2010)
- Dropping Slow (RTE radio drama, 2012)

=== Short stories ===
- "Privacy" (Being Various, 2019)

=== Editor ===
- A Kind of Compass: Stories on Distance (Tramp Press, 2015)

== Awards ==
- 2005 RTE PJ O'Connor Radio Drama Award for Word of Mouth
- 2006 Irish Theatre Award for Drapes as part of Fishamble Theatre Company's Whereabouts
- 2008 Dublin Fringe Festival Audience Choice Award for Two Houses as part of Love 2.0, along with Philip McMahon's Investment Potential
- 2011 Sunday Independent Best Newcomer Award at the Irish Book Awards for Solace
- 2011 Irish Book of the Year at the Irish Book Awards for Solace
- 2011 Geoffrey Faber Memorial Prize for Solace
- 2012 Shortlist for the James Tait Black Memorial Prize for Solace
- 2012 Shortlist for the Kerry Group Irish Novel of the Year for Solace
- 2015 Shortlist for the Eason Bookclub Novel of the Year at the Irish Book Awards for Tender
- 2015 Shortlist for Encore Award for best second novel for Tender.
