= Adam Kirsch =

American poet and literary critic

- Born: 1976 (age 49–50); Los Angeles, California, U.S.
- Occupations: Poet, literary critic
- Parent: Jonathan Kirsch (father)

Academic background
- Education: Harvard University (B.A.)

Academic work
- Institutions: YIVO; Columbia University

Adam Kirsch (born 1976) is an American poet, writer, and literary critic. He is on the seminar faculty of Columbia University's Center for American Studies, and has taught at YIVO Institute for Jewish Research.

== Life and career ==
Kirsch was born in Los Angeles in 1976. He is the son of lawyer, author, and biblical scholar Jonathan Kirsch. He started writing poetry around the age of 14, after encountering the work of T.S. Eliot: "Eliot showed me the possibility of finding in poetry a source of complex intellectual and moral interest." He graduated from Harvard University with a B.A. in English in 1997 and began his career as assistant literary editor for The New Republic. Next he worked as the editor for Lipper Publications.

For a while, Kirsch made his living as a freelance writer, and he has regularly written freelance articles for many different publications including Slate, The New Yorker, The Times Literary Supplement, The New York Times Book Review, and Poetry. Richard John Neuhaus, writing in First Things, called Kirsch "a literary critic of some distinction." Writing in The Nation, John Palattella describes Kirsch as "the intellectual offspring of the New Formalists." Currently, Kirsch is a contributing editor to Harvard Magazine and Tablet Magazine and the author of the weekly column "The Reader" on Nextbook. He also currently holds the position of senior editor for The New Republic, the publication where he started his writing career.

Over the course of his career, he has written reviews and feature articles on a diverse array of poets and novelists, including T.S. Eliot, Thomas Hardy, H.G. Wells, Richard Wilbur, Gerard Manley Hopkins, Dylan Thomas, John Keats, Saul Bellow, John Updike, Hart Crane, and David Foster Wallace. He has also written articles on assorted cultural issues, including rap music, America and the Roman Empire, the relationship between conservative politics in America and the writings of Ayn Rand, and the importance of literary criticism.

Kirsch has published two books of poems, The Thousand Wells and Invasions, as well as nonfiction books on Benjamin Disraeli and Lionel Trilling. The Thousand Wells won The New Criterion Poetry Prize in 2002. His poems have also appeared in many magazines, including The Paris Review, Partisan Review, The Formalist, Harvard Review, and The New Criterion.

In an interview with Contemporary Poetry Review, Kirsch cited Derek Walcott, Glyn Maxwell, Gjertrud Schnackenberg, Adam Zagajewski, Rachel Wetzsteon, Dennis O'Driscoll, Geoffrey Hill, and Jacqueline Osherow as his favorite contemporary poets and Helen Vendler, Frank Kermode, Dana Gioia, William Logan, and Robert Potts as his favorite contemporary poetry critics.

== Critical response ==
=== The Wounded Surgeon ===
Kirsch's book The Wounded Surgeon: Confession and Transformation in Six American Poets was reviewed in major publications, including Poetry and The New York Times Book Review. It received generally mixed reviews. In Poetry, Danielle Chapman wrote:

There's both sense and power in Kirsch's arguments. He skillfully distinguishes the poems that use life as material for poetry from those that use poetry in order to justify or condemn the poet's real-life behavior. He convinces us that the former are art while the latter are exhibitions of narcissism, self-pity, and sentimentality; that a poem succeeds, no matter how brutal or amoral it may be, as long as it retains the integrity of its artifice; that a poem fails when the poet abandons the imaginative work of completing it in order to solicit the reader's sympathy or reproach. What Kirsch doesn't convince us of is his cold-blooded bottom line, which is that if art is to be great, it often must take precedence over life, regardless of the costs.

The New York Times Book Review article by the poet David Lehman was far more negative. He characterized the book as having "a flawed thesis, a few valuable readings of poems and a mess of missed opportunities." But in a review in The New York Times, critic Michiko Kakutani praised the book, calling it "eloquent and very astute." She added:

Mr. Kirsch ... does a wonderfully nimble job of conveying each poet's individual achievement and the evolution of his or her style, as apprenticeship gave way to maturity, as new techniques and language were invented to accommodate new ideas and material. Writing in a manner that is at once erudite and accessible, Mr. Kirsch proves equally adept at dispensing the sort of close readings of individual poems championed by the New Critics and at explicating correspondences between a poet's life and art in a fashion that would have been anathema to the high modernists.

=== The Thousand Wells ===
The critic Ken Tucker wrote a highly critical review of Kirsch's first book of poetry, The Thousand Wells, writing, "Steely technical skill often contradicts the tender feelings and humility invoked throughout Adam Kirsch's first poetry collection. In 'A Love Letter,' he asserts, 'all my powers, poetic, analytical,/Cannot do justice to the theme,' but it's actually the stilted rhymes ('glosses/colossus'; 'momentous /portentous') and the familiarity of images like 'love waxes and wanes,/But, like the hide-and-go-seek of the moon,/It is only hiding, never really gone' that prevent Kirsch from sustaining his meditations on romantic love, city life and religion." But Booklist gave the book a positive review, stating that the book contained no "bad" poems and that "regardless of subject and tone, these are, because of their forms, poems of wit."

=== Invasions and The Modern Element ===
In Poetry, the poet Carmine Starnino wrote a review of two of Kirsch's books published around the same time: Invasions (a book of poems) and The Modern Element (a book of literary criticism). In his review, Starnino focused on Kirsch's status as a poet-critic and how the role of poet-critics in America's literary culture had changed since the heyday of poet-critics in the first half of the 20th century. Regarding The Modern Element, Starnino wrote that Kirsch is "an incomparable context builder, with a near-perfect nose for comparisons. . . [and] is excellent at placing poets in their historical moment, aided by an ability to evoke the way the climate of a period manner can suddenly be made to pivot into the private weather of a poem." Starnino also had mostly positive things to say regarding Invasions which he called "an advance on the 'silent, parcelled, and controlled' poems of the award-winning The Thousand Wells." Startino also noted that the style and form of the poems in Invasions was heavily influenced by the work of Robert Lowell, particularly Lowell's sonnet sequence in the book History. Starnino's only criticism of the poems was that he believed that Kirsch's wording could sometimes seem antiquarian and that his strictness with regard to form could be limiting. Starnino also implied that Kirsch's commitment to strict formalism would guarantee his work a very limited audience.

In The New York Times Book Review, Langdon Hammer also reviewed Invasions and The Modern Element, but unlike Starnino's review, Hammer's was extremely negative. First, in The Modern Element, Hammer took issue with Kirsch's aesthetic literary arguments which he viewed as "narrow and formulaic." He also took issue with Kirsch's criticisms of free-verse poets like Frank O'Hara and Allen Ginsberg and opined that Kirsch was only skilled at criticizing those formalist poets, like Richard Wilbur and Donald Justice, who shared the same conservative approach as Kirsch uses in his own poetry, employing regular rhyme and meter.

With regard to Kirsch's poetry in Invasions, Hammer wrote, "Kirsch's brooding on the end of things [in poems about 9/11 and the Iraq War] becomes as predictable as his iambic pentameter lines, which unroll smoothly without syntactic surprises." Hammer also criticized the poems for being too "cautious and rueful" and without passion.

=== Other work ===
In a review of Kirsch's nonfiction book Why Trilling Matters, William Giraldi of The Daily Beast praised the Trilling book as well as Kirsch's previous nonfiction works:

His Benjamin Disraeli is an expert, emotionally astute study of the complicated Jewish-English statesman and novelist, and The Wounded Surgeon and The Modern Element, his two books on English-language poets, rise to Dr. Johnson's criterion for lasting criticism: the conversion of mere opinion into universal knowledge. In Why Trilling Matters, Kirsch has turned his considerable gifts to the mind he most resembles in comprehensive literary and cultural understanding.

Kirsch generated controversy with an article for The Wall Street Journal titled "Is It Time To Retire the Term 'Genocide'?" in 2023 in response to the Israel-Palestine Conflict.

Kirsch's 2024 book On Settler Colonialism was published in the midst of the Gaza war, during which the use of the term Settler Colonialism surged, mainly in academic circles. The book argued that the vast majority of early Zionists came to Israel as refugees; Israelis have nowhere to return to, unlike settler colonialists such as the French in Algeria or Vietnam; and Jews are indigenous to the land of Israel. He suggested that settler colonialist ideology (SCI) lacks appeal to indigenous peoples, since it does not improve their situation. The book was both praised and criticized in a review published in Kirkus Reviews, which was titled "A rigorous moral reckoning falters by leaving out half of the equation."

== Bibliography ==
=== Books ===
- The Thousand Wells: Poems. Chicago: Ivan R. Dee. 2002.
- The Wounded Surgeon: Confession and Transformation in Six American Poets: Robert Lowell, Elizabeth Bishop, John Berryman, Randall Jarrell, Delmore Schwartz, Sylvia Plath. New York: W. W. Norton. 2005.
- The Modern Element: Essays on Contemporary Poetry, 2008 (W. W. Norton & Company)
- Invasions: New Poems, 2008 (Ivan R. Dee)
- Benjamin Disraeli, 2008 (Schocken)
- Why Trilling Matters, 2011 (Yale University Press)
- Rocket and Lightship: Essays on Literature and Ideas, 2014 (W. W. Norton & Company)
- The Global Novel: Writing the World in the 21st Century, 2016 (Columbia Global Reports)
- The People and The Books: 18 Classics of Jewish Literature, 2016 (W. W. Norton & Company)
- On Settler Colonialism: Ideology, Violence, and Justice, 2024 (W. W. Norton & Company)
- We Want to Believe: How Aliens Went Mainstream and Why It Matters, 2026 (Columbia Global Reports)

=== Articles ===
- "Beware of Pity: Hannah Arendt and the power of the impersonal". The Critics. A Critic at Large. The New Yorker. 84 (44): 62–68. January 12, 2009.
- "On the Edge". The New York Review of Books. 56 (7): 4, 6. 30 April 2009.
- "Letter Heads: The art of correspondence from Keats to Burroughs". Bookforum. 16 (5): 17. Feb–Mar 2010. Reviews Blom, Philipp (2008). The Vertigo Years: Europe, 1900-1914. Basic Books. ISBN 978-0-465-01116-2..
- "Faith Healing: A poet confronts illness and God". The Critics. Books. The New Yorker. 89 (12): 80, 81–83. May 6, 2013. Christian Wiman.
- "Full Fathom Five: Derek Walcott's seascapes". The Critics. Books. The New Yorker. 89 (47): 75–79. February 3, 2014.
- "The System: Two new histories show how the Nazi concentration camps worked". The Critics. Books. The New Yorker. 91 (7): 77–81. April 6, 2015.
- "Design for Living: What's great about Goethe?". The Critics. Books. The New Yorker. 91 (46): 68–72. February 1, 2016.
- "Technology Is Taking Over English Departments: The False Promise of the Digital Humanities." The New Republic. 245 May 2, 2014.
- "Culture as counterculture". The New Criterion. 40 (1). September 2021.
- "Is It Time to Retire the Term 'Genocide'?." The Wall Street Journal. December 8, 2023

=== Book reviews ===
Year	Review article	Work(s) reviewed
1997	"Chekhov in American". Books. The Atlantic Monthly. 280 (1): 110–112. July 1997.	Chekhov, Anton (1997). The Plays of Anton Chekhov. A new translation by Paul Schmidt. New York: HarperCollins.
2010	"The Other Secret Jews". The New Republic. New York. 15 February 2010. Archived from the original on 17 February 2010.	Baer, Marc David (2009). The Dönme: Jewish Converts, Muslim Revolutionaries, and Secular Turks. Stanford, California: Stanford University Press.
