= Anakana Schofield =

Irish-Canadian writer (born 1971)

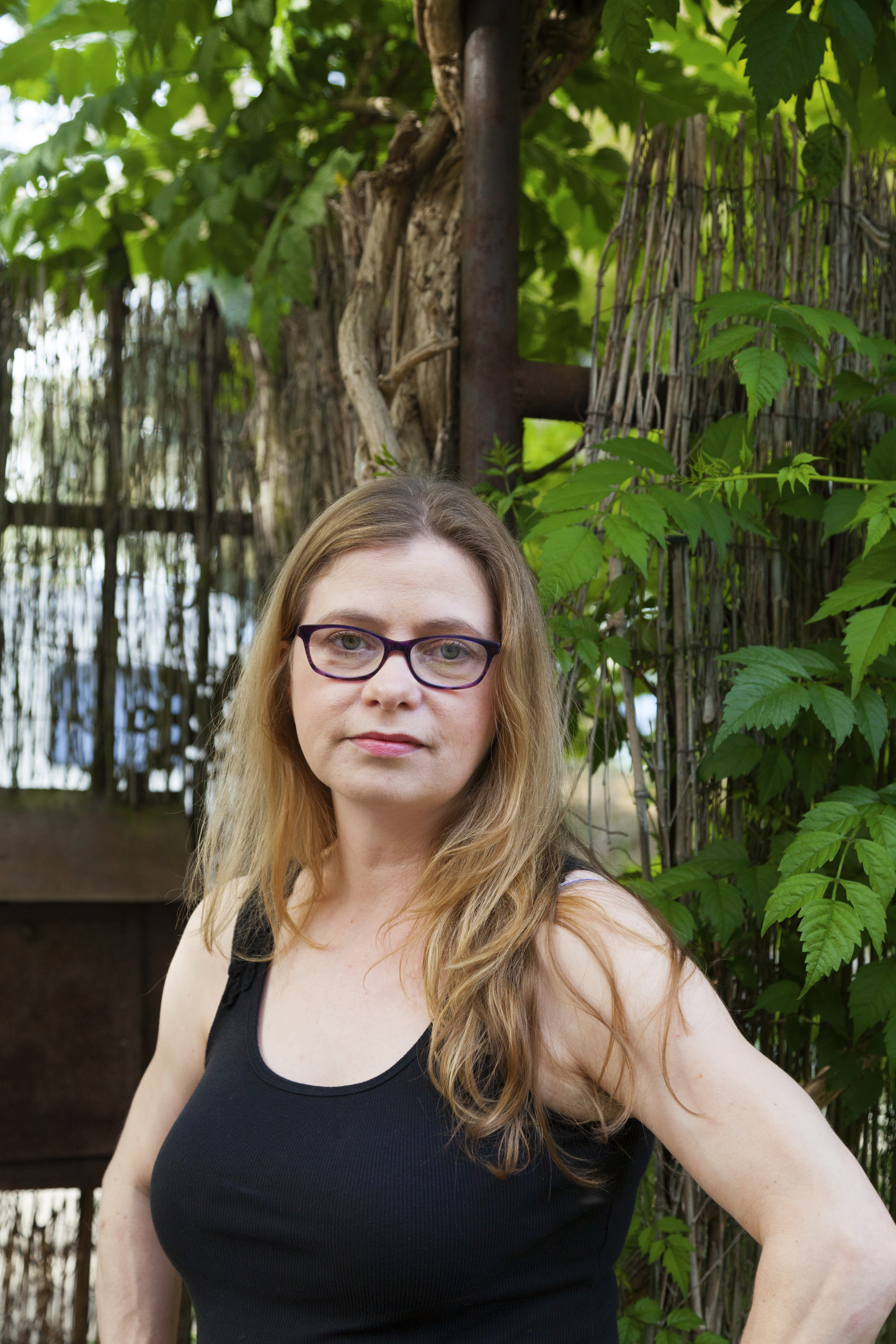
- Schofield in Vancouver, BC (2015)
- Born: 1971 (age 54–55); England
- Occupation: Author
- Writing career
- Period: 2010s–present
- Notable works: Malarky, Martin John
- Website: anakanaschofield.com

Anakana Schofield (born 1971) is an Irish-Canadian author who won the 2012 Amazon Canada First Novel Award for her debut novel Malarky. The novel was also shortlisted for the Ethel Wilson Fiction Prize.

== Early life ==
Born in England to an Irish mother, she lived in London and in Dublin, Ireland, until moving to Vancouver, British Columbia, in 1999.

== Career ==
Her debut novel Malarky won the 2012 Amazon Canada First Novel Award and Late Night Library's 2013 Debut-litzer Prize for Fiction, and was shortlisted for the Ethel Wilson Fiction Prize.

Martin John, her second novel, was published in 2015. The novel was shortlisted for the 2015 Giller Prize, the 2016 Ethel Wilson Fiction Prize, the 2016 Goldsmiths Prize, and the 2017 ReLit Award for Novel. Schofield has also been a literary critic and essayist, contributing to the London Review of Books Blog, The Globe and Mail, and The Guardian, among others.

Her third novel, Bina: A Novel in Warnings, centring on a character from Malarky, was published in 2019 in Canada and 2020 in the UK. Bina was shortlisted for the 2020 Goldsmiths Prize. The jury described the novel as "startlingly original and horribly funny." The novel was published in February 2021 in the US by New York Review Books. Bina won the 2021 Kerry Group Irish Novel of the Year Award.

== Works ==
- Malarky (2012, ISBN 978-1926845388)
- Rereading the Riot Act, And On (2013, ISBN 978-1-927394-10-6)
- Martin John (2015, ISBN 9781771960342)
- Bina: A Novel in Warnings (2019, ISBN 9780735273214)
- Library of Brothel (2026, ISBN 9780735273269)
