= Said the Dead =

2026 book by Doireann Ní Ghríofa

- First edition cover
- Author: Doireann Ní Ghríofa
- Publisher: Faber & Faber
- Publication date: May 21, 2026
- ISBN: 978-0-571-39616-0

Said the Dead is a 2026 work of non-fiction by Doireann Ní Ghríofa. It received positive reception upon release.

== Synopsis ==
Said the Dead is a combination work of biography and memoir that traces the author's research process into a defunct psychiatric hospital in Cork, Ireland, as she seeks to tell the stories of the hospital's historical inhabitants.

== Development ==
=== Publication history ===
Said the Dead was first published in the United Kingdom and Ireland by Faber & Faber in May 2026. It was published in the United States by Farrar, Straus and Giroux on September 22, 2026.

== Reception ==
The book received positive reception upon release. The Guardian praised the book for its detail, especially the vivid language that Ní Ghríofa used in describing the hospital's inhabitants. The Irish Independent was also positive, describing the book as "haunted" and "intelligent," while The Irish Times noted the book's resistance to traditional genre categorization and the shift between first-and-third-person perspectives throughout. Idra Novey, writing in The New York Times, said that the book contained a "chorus of patient voices" that helped to humanize the people who passed through the hospital.

Kirkus Reviews and Publishers Weekly both published starred reviews, with the former positively describing Ní Ghríofa's through-line of empathy in her storytelling and the latter praising the book's "brief snippets of imagined dialogue lineated like poetry." Booklist was also positive, describing the book as an "imaginative" combination of history and reconstruction.
