= Tuula (comic) =

Swedish newspaper humor comic strip

'Tuula' is a Swedish newspaper humor comic strip, drawn by Arja Kajermo and published between 1997 and 2019 every Sunday in the daily paper Dagens Nyheter.

The strip's main characters are Tuula, a Finnish immigrant working as a nurse, and her partner Seppo.
