= Claire-Louise Bennett =

British writer

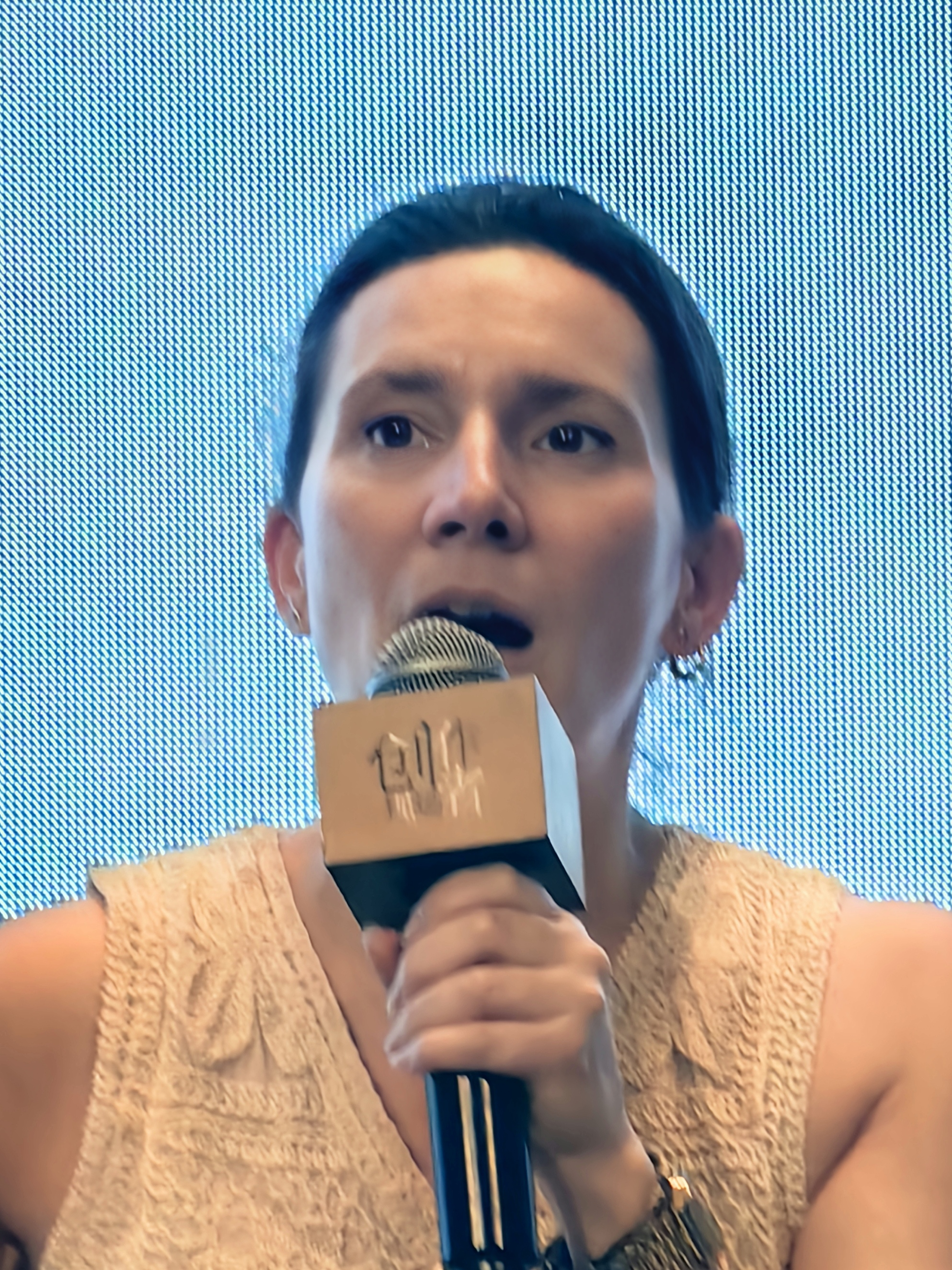
- Claire-Louise Bennett @ 2026 BIBF
- Born: Wiltshire, England
- Education: University of Roehampton
- Occupation: Writer
- Writing career
- Notable works: Pond (2015); Checkout 19 (2021)

Claire-Louise Bennett is a British writer living in Galway, Ireland. She is the author of three books. Her debut, Pond (2015), was shortlisted for the Dylan Thomas Prize. Her second book, the novel Checkout 19 (2021), was shortlisted for the Goldsmiths Prize. Her novel Big Kiss, Bye-Bye appeared in 2025 and was shortlisted for the James Tait Black Prize for fiction the following year.

== Early life and education ==
Bennett grew up in a working-class family in Wiltshire, South-West England. She studied literature and drama at the University of Roehampton in London. She emigrated from the UK to Galway in Ireland around the turn of the millennium.

== Career ==
=== Pond (2015) ===
Her debut book, Pond (2015), a collection of 20 interconnected stories, was very positively reviewed, with Andrew Gallix in The Guardian concluding: "This is a truly stunning debut, beautifully written and profoundly witty." Meghan O'Rourke wrote in The New York Times: "More than anything this book reminded me of the kind of old-fashioned British children’s books I read growing up — books steeped in contrarianism and magic, delicious scones and inviting ponds, otherworldly yet bracingly real. ... Despite its occasional unevenness, 'Pond' makes the case for Bennett as an innovative writer of real talent." According to Brian Dillon, reviewing it for the London Review of Books, "At its best, in the longer stories such as 'Lady of the House' and 'Morning, Noon & Night', Pond is all that its author admires in others: a work of gorgeous stylistic and structural ambition, deadpan comedy and profound, that is to say profoundly odd, expression."

=== Checkout 19 (2021) ===
Bennett's 2021 novel, Checkout 19, was described by Leo Robson in The Guardian as an "elatingly risky and irreducible book", and was characterised in the TLS by Desirée Baptiste as "really a collection of seven vignettes (essay-stories) offering glimpses of the unnamed narrator’s younger self, throughout her reading and writing life. ... Checkout 19 is utterly original, fashioned from the many narratives (books read, stories written, ideologies debunked) that have shaped a female working-class writer’s distinctive sensibility." Praising Checkout 19 in The Scotsman, literary critic Stuart Kelly said: "This is one of the most extraordinary books it has been my privilege to review. ... If I were a Booker judge again, I would move heaven and earth to get this on the shortlist."

== Awards ==
- 2013: Winner, The White Review Short Story Prize for "The Lady of the House"
- 2016: Shortlisted, Dylan Thomas Prize for Pond
- 2021: Shortlisted, Goldsmiths Prize for Checkout 19

== Publications ==
=== Novels ===
- Checkout 19. London: Jonathan Cape. 2021.
- Big Kiss, Bye-Bye. London: Fitzcarraldo Editions. 2025.

=== Short fiction ===
Collections

- Pond. Stinging Fly. 2015. (Note: Paperback edition published by Fitzcarraldo Editions, also 2015.)

Stories (Note: Short stories unless otherwise noted.)

Title	Year	First published	Reprinted/collected	Notes
"Invisible bird"	2022	"Invisible bird". The New Yorker. Vol. 98, no. 14. 30 May 2022. pp. 54–59.		

=== Non-fiction ===
- Fish out of water. Milan: Juxta Press. 2020.
