= Wendy Erskine =

Northern Irish author (born 1968)

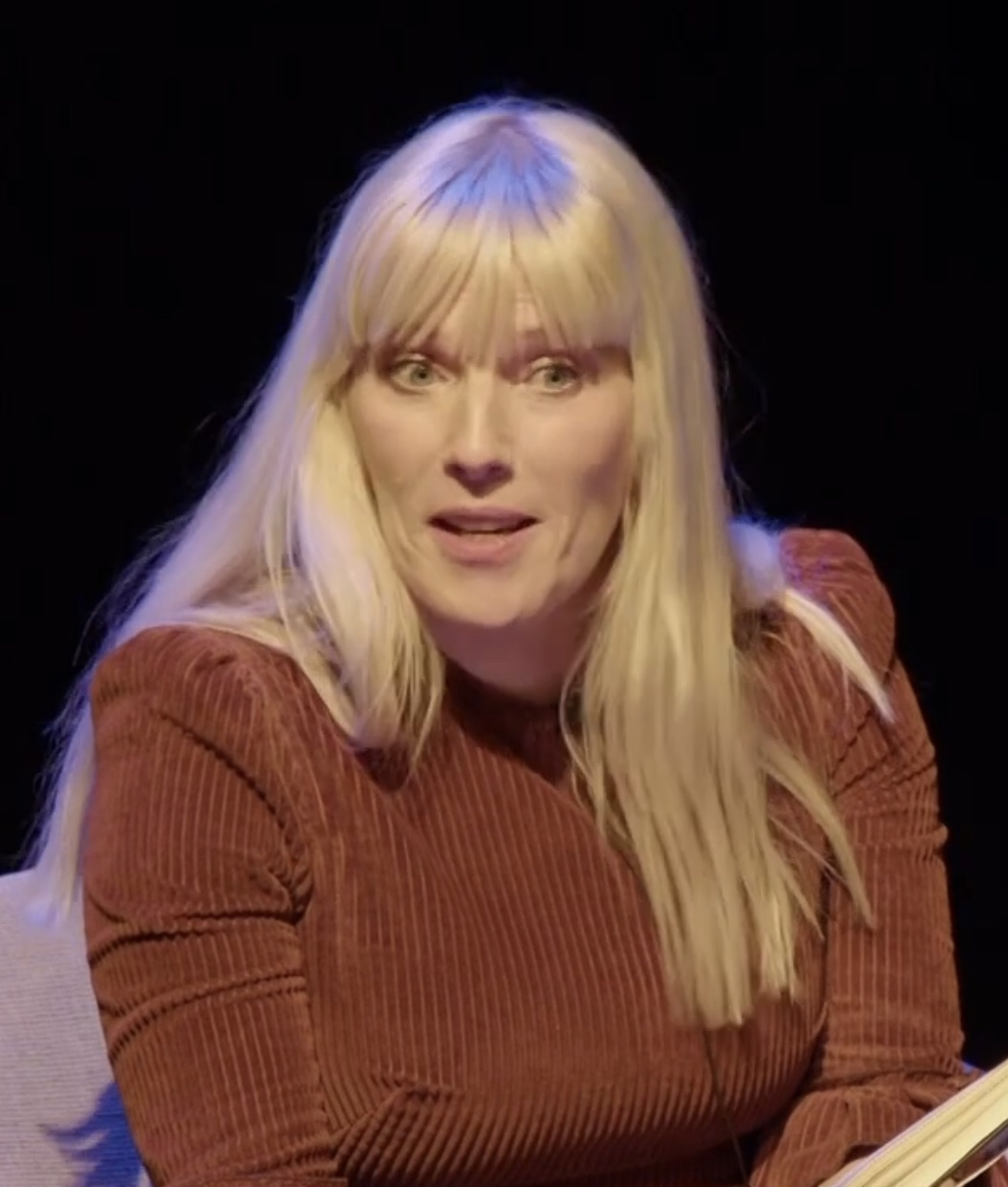
- Erskine at the British Library's 2023 Irish Writers' Weekend
- Born: 1968 (age 57–58); Belfast, Northern Ireland
- Occupations: Author; teacher
- Notable work: Sweet Home, Dance Move, The Benefactors

Wendy Erskine (born 1968) is a Northern Irish author and teacher. She has published two short story collections and a novel. She has been shortlisted for the Republic of Consciousness Prize and twice for the Edge Hill Short Story Prize and longlisted for the Sunday Times Short Story Award and the Gordon Burn Prize. She has won the Butler Prize for Literature and the Edge Hill Readers' Choice Award. She is a Fellow of the Royal Society of Literature and a former Seamus Heaney Centre Fellow at Queen's University Belfast.

== Life ==
Erskine was born in Belfast in 1968. She attended Belfast High School and then Glasgow University, where she took a degree in English Literature. She took a postgraduate degree in teaching and worked as a teacher in Newcastle-upon-Tyne before returning to Belfast. She took a post at Strathearn School, where she teaches English and is head of department. Writer Lucy Caldwell was one of her A level students.

She is married with two children and lives in Belfast.

== Career ==
=== Early writing and Sweet Home ===
Erskine started writing seriously in 2015, when she attended a six month The Stinging Fly fiction course in Dublin. The story she wrote for the workshop was later published in The Stinging Fly.

Stinging Fly Press went on to publish her first collection, Sweet Home, in 2018 (published in the UK by Picador). The Times Literary Supplement praised its brisk narration and zippy, funny dialogue and called it "an arch and affectionate homage to the low-level dysfunction that gives a place its sense of character". The Guardian noted its "exceptional ear for dialogue, an impeccable semantic rhythm and an uncanny ability to tease laughter out of the darkest moments" and called it "a gripping, wonderfully understated book that oozes humanity, emotion and humour."

The collection was shortlisted for the Edge Hill Short Story Prize and the Republic of Consciousness Prize. It was longlisted for the Gordon Burn Prize. and won the 2020 Butler Literary Award, a prize for emerging Irish writers. It was a book of the year selection for The Guardian, The White Review, the Times Literary Supplement, and others. A story from the collection, "Inakeen", was longlisted for the 2019 Sunday Times Short Story Award.

=== Dance Move ===
Erskine's second collection, Dance Move, was published by Stinging Fly Press in 2022 (Picador in the UK). The Guardian called it propulsive and pleasurable, with the stories united by an emphasis on the unlived life. The Times Literary Supplement praised its attentive observation, witty dialogue, and convincing depictions of Belfast life, but found that as a whole the collection suffered from repeated narrative rhythms and bathetic endings.

The collection was shortlisted for the Edge Hill Short Story Prize and a story from the collection, "His Mother", won the Edge Hill Readers' Choice Award. Another story from the collection, "Mathematics", was shortlisted in the best short story category in the 2022 Irish Book Awards.

=== The Benefactors ===
Erskine published her first novel, The Benefactors, in 2025. Centred on a sexual assault at a party, the novel follows the effects on teenager Misty and her non-conventional family, the boys involved in the assault, and their families, but also features stories and monologues by countless other characters, some connected with the storyline and some anonymous and disconnected.

The Observer, which named Erskine one of its best new novelists in 2025, called it daring and funny and "a thrill to read", praising its elegant rendering of its complex timeframes. The Times Literary Supplement called it exhilarating, finding it remarkable for "the way the narrative circles around the main event, hovers over it and explores its ramifications subtly as the author marshals her cast with even-handedness and elan".

=== Other ===
In addition to her works of fiction, Erskine edited Well I Just Kind of Like It (2022), a collection of essays and other pieces on art in the home and the home as art.

She acted as a judge for the 2022 Republic of Consciousness Prize.

She was a Seamus Heaney Centre Fellow at Queen's University Belfast in 2021-22.

She was appointed a Fellow of the Royal Society of Literature in 2023.

== Works ==
=== Short fiction ===
- 2018 Sweet Home, Stinging Fly Press, ISBN 9781906539719
- 2022 Dance Move, Stinging Fly Press, ISBN 9781906539924

=== Novel ===
- 2025 The Benefactors, Sceptre, ISBN 9781399741668

=== As editor ===
- 2022 well I just kind of like it: Art in the home and the home as art, Paper Visual Art Journal, ISBN 9781916150935
