= A Girl Is a Half-formed Thing =

2013 novel by Eimear McBride

- Author: Eimear McBride
- Cover artist: Oleksandr Kovalchuk
- Language: English
- Genre: Novel, stream of consciousness, Bildungsroman
- Set in: rural Ireland, 1980s/90s
- Published: 2013 (Galley Beggar Press); 2014 USA (Coffee House Press); 2014 (Faber and Faber); 2015 USA (Hogarth Press)
- Publication place: United Kingdom
- Media type: Print
- Pages: 227
- Awards: 2014 Desmond Elliott Prize; 2014 Kerry Group Irish Fiction Award; 2014 Baileys Women's Prize for Fiction; 2013 Geoffrey Faber Memorial Prize; 2013 Goldsmiths Prize
- ISBN: 1566893682
- OCLC: 839315421
- Dewey Decimal: 823.92
- LC Class: PR6113 .C337

A Girl Is a Half-formed Thing is the debut novel of Eimear McBride published in 2013.

== Content and style ==
This stream of consciousness novel explores an Irish girl's relationship with her disabled brother, religious mother, and her own troubled sexuality.

Joshua Cohen described how McBride's experimental style "forgoes quotation marks and elides verbiage for sense, sound and sheer appearance on the page. For emphasis it occasionally wreaks havoc on capitals and reverses letter order."

== Genesis and publication ==
McBride began writing her debut novel whilst working in a series of office temp jobs. It took nine years to find a publisher and was rejected by numerous companies. The book was eventually first published in 2013, with an initial print run of 1000 copies, by Galley Beggar Press of Norwich, England. Mr Layte, of Galley Beggar Press recalled that the unusual writing-style led him to take up the novel where others had overlooked it:

I thought this was one of the most important books I had ever read. It had the same effect on me as when I first read Samuel Beckett. It was a game-changer as far as what could be done.

In 2014, rights for a trade paperback were sold to publishers Faber and Faber.

== Reviews and prizes ==
In a New York Times review, Joshua Cohen described the book as being "in all respects, a heresy — which is to say, Lord above, it’s a future classic." Reviewing the novel for The Guardian, Anne Enright wrote that it "is hard to read for the best reasons: everything about it is intense and difficult and hard-won."

A New Yorker review by James Wood recounted the novel as "blazingly daring. . . . Eimear McBride prose is a visceral throb, and the sentences run meanings together to produce a kind of compression in which words, freed from the tedious march of sequence, seem to want to merge with one another, as paint and musical notes can. The results are thrilling, and also thrillingly efficient.”

Kirkus Reviews states that the novel is "exhilarating fiction from a voice to watch."

Adam Mars-Jones in his review for the London Review of Books described the work of Eimear McBride as "if every book was as intense as this, reading literature would be even more of a minority pursuit than it is already. A Girl Is a Half-Formed Thing makes that rapturous lament By Grand Central Station I Sat Down and Wept look like Hotel du Lac. But then you wouldn’t want to go to Not I every night of the week."

Annie Galvin for Los Angeles Review of Books stated that "to read the opening paragraph of Eimear McBride’s novel is to be radically disoriented. Sentence fragments pile up, and the familiar skeleton of the English sentence gets fractured, splintered into microscopic units (“You’ll soon.” “Bile for.”) that truncate without pointing in any obvious direction. The novel is many things: an elegy, a fever dream, a document of abuse, a distorted transposition of one consciousness into language. It is not clear; it is not easy. It takes effort to decode."

NPR book reviewer Heller McAlpin advice to the readers is to "be prepared to be blown away by this raw, visceral, brutally intense neomodernist first novel. There's nothing easy about Eimear McBride's novel, from its fractured language to its shattering story of the young unnamed narrator's attempt to drown mental anguish with physical pain."

The novel won several awards including the Kerry Group Irish Novel of the Year, the Goldsmiths Prize, the Desmond Elliott Prize, the Baileys Women's Prize for Fiction, and the Geoffrey Faber Memorial Prize.

The Guardian Book Club featured the novel in 2016, and the BBC Radio 4 Book Club featured the novel in early 2018.

== Adaptations ==
In 2014, the novel was adapted for the stage by Annie Ryan. Initially appearing at the Corn Exchange, Dublin, the production later appeared at the Young Vic in London, the Traverse Theatre in Edinburgh, and the Baryshnikov Arts Center in New York.

The Times Literary Supplement critic Davic Collard described the experience in his review as "When I saw the show again the following night it was, if anything, even more powerful. Like the novel, it has a momentous presence. Unlike the novel, the play is a collective experience."

The audiobook of the novel, read by the author, was released in 2014.
