= Natasha Soobramanien =

Mauritian author

- Born: London, England
- Education: University of Hull; University of East Anglia
- Occupation: Novelist
- Years active: 2012–present
- Notable work: Diego Garcia
- Awards: Goldsmiths Prize

Natasha Soobramanien is a British-Mauritian novelist who received the Goldsmiths Prize in 2022 for her novel Diego Garcia.

== Early life ==
Soobramanien was born and raised in North London to Mauritian parents. She also spent some of her childhood moving around as her father was in the RAF, with stints in Hong Kong and Hastings. She graduated from the University of Hull and the University of East Anglia.

Her debut novel, published in 2012 by Myriad Editions, was Genie and Paul, a re-telling of the 18th-century novel Paul et Virginie written by Jacques-Henri Bernardin de Saint-Pierre. In collaboration with Luke Williams, she wrote the 2022 novel Diego Garcia (published by Fitzcarraldo Editions), which won the Goldsmiths Prize.
