= Fish Anthology =

Yearly short story anthology in Ireland

Fish Anthology is a yearly short story anthology based in Ireland published by Fish Publishing that collects the best short fiction published annually in the United States, United Kingdom, the Republic of Ireland, Canada and other English-speaking nations. The volume was first published in 1994 by Clem Cairns and Jula Walton. It is widely regarded as the leading short story annual in Ireland.

Roddy Doyle is a long-time sponsor of the anthology. Dermot Healy and Frank McCourt were past sponsors.

== Notable contributors ==
- Kathleen Murray
- Jacob M. Appel
- Catherine Phil MacCarthy
- Ted Sheehy
- Courtney Zoffness
- Ronan Bennett
