= The Stinging Fly =

Irish literary magazine

- Editor: Lisa McInerney
- Former editors: Danny Denton, Sally Rooney, Thomas Morris, Declan Meade
- Frequency: Twice-yearly
- Founder: Declan Meade; Aoife Kavanagh
- Founded: 1998
- Country: Ireland
- Based in: Dublin
- Website: stingingfly.org
- ISSN: 1393-5690

The Stinging Fly is a literary magazine published in Ireland, featuring short stories, essays, and poetry. It publishes two issues each year. In 2005, The Stinging Fly moved into book publishing with the establishment of The Stinging Fly Press. The magazine has been described as "something of a revelation in Irish literature" by The New York Times.

== Magazine ==
=== History and editors ===
The Stinging Fly magazine was founded in 1998 by Declan Meade and Aoife Kavanagh. Kavanagh departed after two issues, leaving Meade as sole editor. The enterprise was initially inspired by David Marcus and the publication of the Fish Anthology. The stated founding objective was to provide a forum for the very best new Irish and international writing.

Eabhan Ní Shúileabháin became poetry editor in September 2001. After 18 published issues, Meade took a break in 2004 and, as he says on the official website, "toyed with the idea of giving it all up." The magazine reappeared as Issue 1 of Volume 2 in summer 2005, in a new 75x245mm format with graphic design by Fergal Condon. The new volume also introduced a "featured poet" section of four or five pages which allows a relatively new poet to present a more representative sample of his or her work. The first featured poet was Phillip Crymble.

From 2014 to 2016, Thomas Morris was the magazine's editor. Sally Rooney was editor from December 2017 until January 2019, and is now Chair of the Stinging Fly Board. Danny Denton succeeded as editor in 2019. In June 2022, novelist Lisa McInerney was announced as the new editor, the sixth editor in the magazine's twenty-five-year history.

=== Writers ===
Most of the contributors are new or emerging writers, and usually have some connection to Ireland. Equal emphasis is given to short stories and poetry, with occasional other material such as novel extracts, song lyrics, and author interviews. Along with The Dublin Review, The Honest Ulsterman, The Dublin Review of Books, and various other titles, it is one of a number of periodicals to have contributed to a boom in Irish literary journals over the past decade.

Notable writers who have made their debuts in the magazine include: Sally Rooney, Nicole Flattery, Sara Baume, Rob Doyle, Colin Barrett, Wendy Erskine, and Oisin Fagan.

== The Stinging Fly Press ==
The Stinging Fly Press was established in 2005, and the first title, Watermark by Derry-born author Sean O'Reilly, was published in May that year. In July 2006, the imprint brought out a special fiction issue of the magazine in book form, These Are Our Lives, featuring 22 short stories by Irish and international writers.

In March 2007, The Stinging Fly published There Are Little Kingdoms, the debut story collection from Kevin Barry. The book went on to win the 2007 Rooney Prize, and received rave reviews. In May 2012, The Stinging Fly published The China Factory, a short story collection by Mary Costello. The book received positive reviews, notably in The Guardian, and went on to be longlisted for The Guardian First Book Award. In September 2013, The Stinging Fly press published Young Skins by Colin Barrett, which went on win the Frank O'Connor International Short Story Award, The Guardian first book award, and the Rooney Prize for Irish Literature. In 2015, The Stinging Fly Press published Pond by Claire-Louise Bennett and Dinosaurs on Other Planets by Danielle McLaughlin, both to exceptional acclaim.

== Davy Byrnes Short Story Award ==
Between 2004 and 2014, The Stinging Fly organised the Davy Byrnes Short Story Award, a prize for a single short story. The prize was held every five years.

- 2004 winner: Anne Enright for her story "Honey". The judges were A. L. Kennedy, The Irish Times literary editor Caroline Walsh, and Tobias Wolf.
- 2009 winner: Claire Keegan for her story "Foster". The judge was Richard Ford.
- 2014 winner: Sara Baume for her story "Solesearcher1". The judges were Anne Enright, Jon McGregor and Yiyun Li

== Stinging Fly/FBA Fiction Prize ==
In May 2022, Emer O'Hanlon was announced 2022 winner of the inaugural Stinging Fly/FBA Fiction Prize for her story "Diana in a Lonely Place". She was followed by Leopold O'Shea in 2023 for his story, "The Afterlife", and Moso Sematlane in 2024 for "A Fern Between Rocks". The €2000 prize is awarded annually to an emerging fiction writer published in The Stinging Fly during the previous year.

== See also ==
- List of literary magazines
