= Fred Potts (footballer) =

English footballer

Personal information
- Full name: Robert Frederick Potts
- Date of birth: 1893
- Place of birth: Congleton, England
- Height: 5 ft 9 1/2 in (1.77 m)
- Position: Right back

Senior career*
| Years | Team | Apps | (Gls) |
- Bacup Borough
| 1912–1922 | Bradford City | 136 | (0) |
- Congleton Town
- * Club domestic league appearances and goals

Robert Frederick Potts (born 1893) was an English professional footballer who played as a right back.

== Career ==
Born in Congleton, Potts played for Bacup Borough, Bradford City and Congleton Town. For Bradford City, he made 136 appearances in the Football League; he also made 11 FA Cup appearances.

== Sources ==
- Frost, Terry (1988). Bradford City A Complete Record 1903–1988. Breedon Books Sport. ISBN 0-907969-38-0.
