= Saturday Review (radio programme) =

BBC Radio 4 cultural review show

Saturday Review was a weekly radio programme broadcast on BBC Radio 4 which "offers sharp, critical discussion of the week's cultural events", according to the show's website.

The show was presented by Tom Sutcliffe. It was replaced in 2021.
