= Music of the Final Fantasy Crystal Chronicles series =

Music from the Final Fantasy Crystal Chronicles video game series

The Final Fantasy Crystal Chronicles video game series consists of Crystal Chronicles, a spin-off of the main Final Fantasy series, its sequels My Life as a King and My Life as a Darklord, and their spin-offs, Ring of Fates, Echoes of Time and The Crystal Bearers. Crystal Chronicles, Ring of Fates, and Echoes of Time have had released soundtrack albums to date, and Crystal Chronicles and Ring of Fates each have an associated single. Kumi Tanioka is the main composer for the series, having composed the three released soundtracks as well as the music for My Life as a King and My Life as a Darklord. Hidenori Iwasaki is filling that role for The Crystal Bearers. Nobuo Uematsu, the main composer for the regular Final Fantasy series, contributed one track to the Ring of Fates soundtrack. Yae and Donna Burke sang the Japanese and English versions of the theme song for Crystal Chronicles, respectively, while Aiko sang the theme song for Ring of Fates.

Final Fantasy Crystal Chronicles Original Soundtrack was released by Pony Canyon in 2003, as was its single, "Kaze no Ne", and a promotional album Final Fantasy Crystal Chronicles - A Musical Journey. Final Fantasy Crystal Chronicles: Ring of Fates Original Soundtrack and the double A-side "Hoshi no Nai Sekai"/"Yokogao" were released by Pony Canyon in 2007. The latest release is that of Final Fantasy Crystal Chronicles: Echoes of Time Original Soundtrack by Square Enix in 2009. All the albums and the singles received generally positive reviews, although the Crystal Chronicles album was the most universally appreciated of the three soundtracks. Unlike the soundtracks to the numbered Final Fantasy games, no compositions from the Crystal Chronicles soundtracks have appeared in any compilation albums produced by Square Enix or any official Final Fantasy concerts. "Morning Sky", the opening theme for Crystal Chronicles, was played in the first Games in Concert performance in Utrecht, Netherlands on November 26, 2006.

== Creation and influence ==
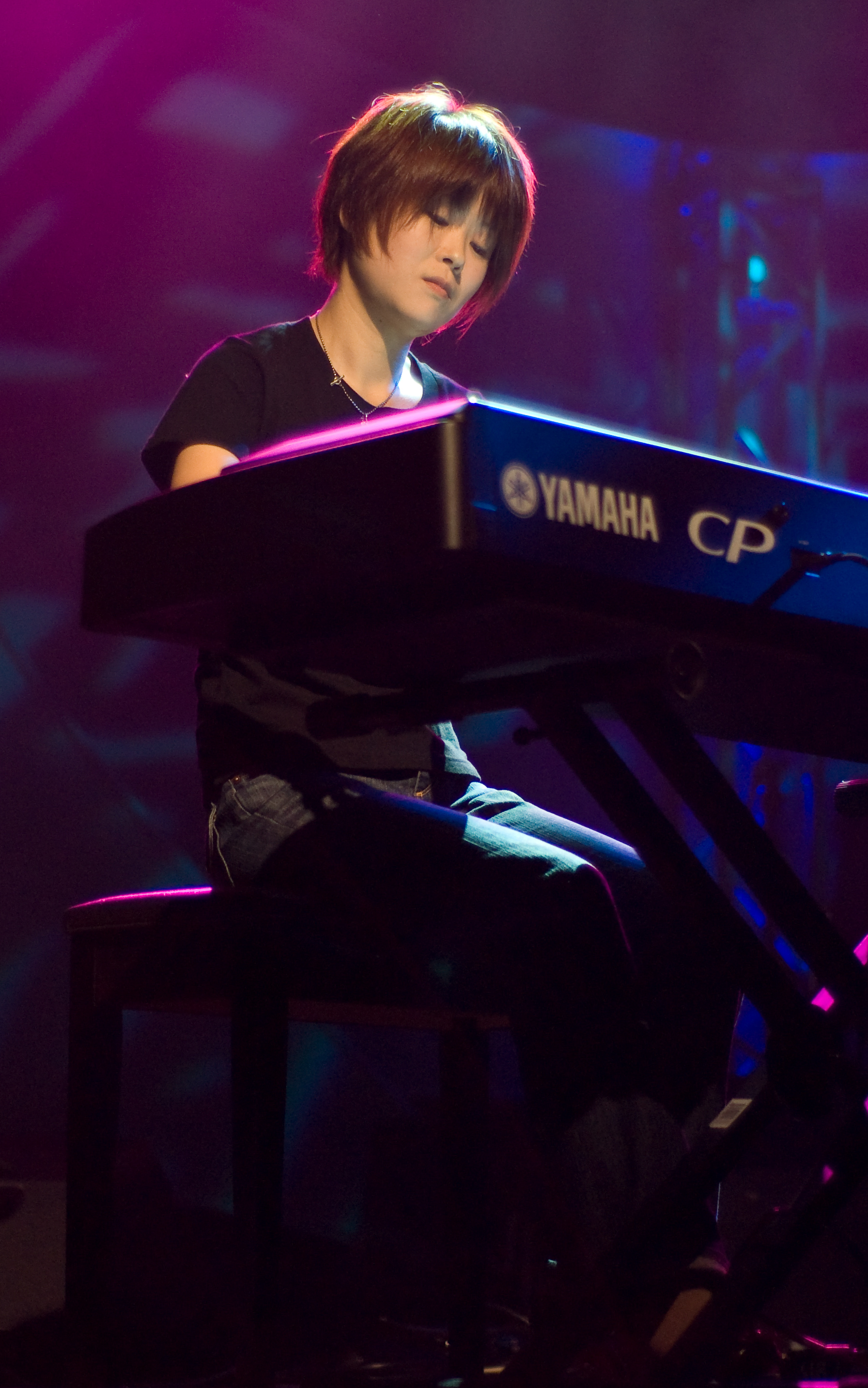
Kumi Tanioka composed and arranged the series' music.

Kumi Tanioka has described the musical style for the soundtrack to Final Fantasy Crystal Chronicles as being based on "ancient instruments". She says that the idea came to her while looking at illustrations of the game world, which gave her the idea of making "world music", where the tracks would "not [be] limited to a single country or culture". She also credits Hidenori Iwasaki, the synthesizer operator for the game, with doing "fantastic technical work" that brought her vision to life. For the soundtrack to Ring of Fates, Tanioka purposefully did not focus on "world music", instead focusing on "creating a new landscape containing the same atmosphere". The piano performances in the Ring of Fates soundtrack were done by Kumi Tanioka. She did the performances herself rather than use an outside performer as most Final Fantasy soundtracks have done primarily because she "likes to play piano", and were done without any sheet music, as she preferred instead to improvise. She took extensive piano lessons as a child, and lists piano and choral music as the biggest influences on her musical style. She also claims to have been influenced by music from a wide variety of cultures, such as Indonesian, Irish and Balinese music. She did not compose the soundtrack for The Crystal Bearers; this role was instead performed by Hidenori Iwasaki.

Tanioka has said that in composing the soundtrack for Echoes of Time she tried to "paint the world in an ethnic manner once again". She said that she tried throughout the soundtracks of the first four Crystal Chronicles games to "maintain a common atmosphere between each installment, [but] always introduce a new concept". With Echoes of Time Tanioka wanted to go back to the "tribal" concept of the original Crystal Chronicles. She said in regards to the soundtrack that "instead of the traditional sound endemic to the specific areas, I wanted to use them as one flavor and blend many colors just like Final Fantasy Crystal Chronicles" and that many of the tracks she created would be "actually impossible to perform" in real life.

== Albums ==
=== Final Fantasy Crystal Chronicles Original Soundtrack ===
Final Fantasy Crystal Chronicles Original Soundtrack

Soundtrack album by Kumi Tanioka
- Released: August 20, 2003
- Length: Disc one - 66:22; Disc two - 65:16
- Label: Pony Canyon
- Producer: Square Enix

Final Fantasy Crystal Chronicles Original Soundtrack is the soundtrack album of Final Fantasy Crystal Chronicles, containing the majority of the musical tracks from the game, and was composed by Kumi Tanioka. It was released on the Pony Canyon label on August 20, 2003. The album did not include the English versions of the opening song, "Sound of the Wind" and the ending theme, "Moonless Starry Night", all sung by Donna Burke. The style of the music on this album is not defined, but was described by Kumi Tanioka as being based on "ancient instruments". The soundtrack has extensive use of many medieval and Renaissance musical instruments such as the recorder, the crumhorn and the lute, creating a distinctively rustic feel, and also follows the practices and styles of medieval music. The soundtrack spans 52 tracks over 2 discs, covering a duration of 2:11:38, and has the catalog number PCCG-00613.

Final Fantasy Crystal Chronicles: A Musical Journey was a European promotional album which was given alongside the game on March 11, 2004 if the game had been pre-ordered. It contains six tracks from the soundtrack, including "Kaze no Ne" in both Japanese and English, the only time the English version has been released. It was published by Nintendo of Europe, and covers a duration of 17:37.

Final Fantasy Crystal Chronicles Original Soundtrack sold over 5,800 copies. It was well received; Daniel Space of RPGFan praised it, saying that "the music is fun, extremely well written and interesting to hear". He enjoyed the alternative instruments used in the tunes, calling them "successful in providing imagery of renaissance times", although he felt that much more of them would have begun to drag the soundtrack down. Chris of Square Enix Music Online also enjoyed the soundtrack, although he noted that it was "not for everyone". He did, however, feel that the constant use of Renaissance-themed music resulted in a "lack of diversity of styles" that made several of the tracks "bland and indistinctive". Jared of Square Enix Music Online was more enthusiastic about the soundtrack, terming it "a stunning soundtrack full of feeling and emotion" and praising its "unique" style. As a promotional album, Final Fantasy Crystal Chronicles - A Musical Journey was not as noted by critics. Jared felt that it was "a decent look into the soundtrack of Crystal Chronicles", but not as good of a sampler disc as it could have been due to the track selection.

Track listing

Disc one

| # | Japanese title | English title | Length |
|---|---|---|---|
| 1. | "記憶のこだま" Kioku no kodama | "Echo of Memories" | 0:47 |
| 2. | "カゼノネ" Kaze no Ne | "Sound of the Wind" | 3:36 |
| 3. | "やすらぎ" Yasuragi | "Serenity" | 0:41 |
| 4. | "今日が来て、明日になって" Kyou ga kite, ashita ni natte | "Today Arrives, Becoming Tomorrow" | 2:14 |
| 5. | "はじまりの村" Hajimari no mura | "The First Town" | 2:40 |
| 6. | "キャラバン・クロスロード" KYARABAN KUROSOROODO | "Caravan Crossroad" | 1:16 |
| 7. | "旅立ち" Tabidachi | "Departure" | 4:15 |
| 8. | "川面にうつる雲" Kawazura ni utsuru kumo | "Moving Clouds on the River's Surface" | 1:27 |
| 9. | "夢路の夕暮れ" Yumeji no yuugure | "Twilight in Dreamland" | 3:51 |
| 10. | "鎚音ひびく峠にて" Hibikutouge nite | "Echoes at the Mountain Peak" | 2:29 |
| 11. | "憂いの闇の中で" Urei no yami no naka de | "In the Gloomy Darkness" | 3:33 |
| 12. | "にぎわいと伝統と" Nigiwai to dentou to | "Prosperity and Tradition" | 2:17 |
| 13. | "おののけ、もののけ" Ononoke, mononoke | "Shudder, Monster" | 3:23 |
| 14. | "三人いれば...？" Sannin ireba...? | "If It's Three People...?" | 2:09 |
| 15. | "誓いは永遠に" Chikai wa eien ni | "Eternal Oath" | 3:01 |
| 16. | "閉じられた物語" Tojirareta monogatari | "End of the Tale" | 0:15 |
| 17. | "マギーがすべて" MAGII ga subete | "Maggie Is Everything" | 2:53 |
| 18. | "アミダッティも、エレオノールも" AMIDATTI mo, EREONOORU mo | "Amidatty and Eleanor, too" | 3:29 |
| 19. | "約束のうるおい" Yakusoku no uruoi | "Promised Grace" | 2:54 |
| 20. | "そよかぜ吹けば" Soyokaze fukeba | "A Gentle Wind Blows" | 2:10 |
| 21. | "風のこえ、時のうた" Kaze no koe, toki no uta | "Voice of Wind, Song of Time" | 3:12 |
| 22. | "魔物の砦" Mamono no toride | "Goblin's Lair" | 3:14 |
| 23. | "覚悟を決めろ" Kakugo o kimero | "Make a Resolution" | 0:50 |
| 24. | "怪物の輪舞 ～ロンド～" Kaibutsu no rinbu ~RONDO~ | "Monster's Dance ~Rondo~" | 2:56 |
| 25. | "命の水" Inochi no mizu | "Water of Life" | 1:13 |
| 26. | "ぼくモーグリ" Boku MOOGURI | "I'm Moogle" | 1:05 |
| 27. | "なつかしい横顔" Natsukashii yokogao | "Nostalgic Profile" | 1:29 |
| 28. | "年に一度のお祭り" Nen ni ichido no omatsuri | "Annual Festival" | 2:42 |

Disc two

| # | Japanese title | English title | Length |
|---|---|---|---|
| 1. | "はてしなき空" Hateshinaki sora | "Endless Sky" | 1:57 |
| 2. | "ただ突き進むのみ" Tada tsukisusumu nomi | "Meager Advance" | 1:04 |
| 3. | "ぼくのおうち" Boku no ouchi | "My Den" | 1:28 |
| 4. | "大海原をながめて" Oounabara o nagamete | "Overlooking the Great Ocean" | 1:20 |
| 5. | "心の奥に燃ゆるもの" Kokoro no oku ni nen yuru mono | "Something Burns in the Heart" | 3:44 |
| 6. | "「自由」に身をゆだねて" "Jiyuu" ni mi o yudanete | "Leaving the Body Freely" | 1:53 |
| 7. | "砂に眠る秘宝" Suna ni nemuru hihou | "Sleeping Treasure in the Sand" | 3:42 |
| 8. | "光よ...！" Hikaru yo...! | "Oh, Light...!" | 2:29 |
| 9. | "新天地を目指して" Shintenchi o mezashite | "Aiming Towards the New World" | 4:30 |
| 10. | "哀しみを強さに" Kanashimi o tsuyosa ni | "Strength in Sadness" | 1:49 |
| 11. | "笑顔いっぱいの時間" Egao ippai no jikan | "The Time of Many Smiling Faces" | 1:58 |
| 12. | "北の空が澄んでいたころ" Kita no sora ga sundeita koro | "When the Northern Sky Was Clear" | 3:19 |
| 13. | "マグ・メル" MAGU MERU | "Mag Mell" | 2:35 |
| 14. | "アクロス・ザ・ディバイド" AKUROSU ZA DIBAIDO | "Across the Divide" | 2:31 |
| 15. | "心の中に響く音" Kokoro no uchi ni hibiku oto | "Echoes in the Heart" | 2:00 |
| 16. | "光と影" Hikari to kage | "Light and Shadow" | 1:38 |
| 17. | "忘れたくない..." Wasuretakunai... | "I Don't Want to Forget..." | 3:43 |
| 18. | "哀しい怪物" Kanashii kaibutsu | "Sad Monster" | 3:59 |
| 19. | "融合、降臨" Yuugou, kourin | "Unite, Descent" | 4:07 |
| 20. | "クリスタルを継ぐ者へ" KURISUTARU o tsugusha e | "To the Successor of the Crystal" | 2:00 |
| 21. | "どこまでも蒼く" Doko made mo aoi | "Thoroughly Blue" | 2:00 |
| 22. | "星月夜" Hoshizukiyo | "Starry Moonlit Night" | 4:24 |
| 23. | "水のオルゴール" Mizu no ORUGOORU | "Orgel of Water" | 1:14 |
| 24. | "星月夜 ～アレンジバージョン～" Hoshizukiyo ~ARENJI BAAJON~ | "Starry Moonlit Night ~Arranged Version~" | 5:36 |

=== Final Fantasy Crystal Chronicles: Ring of Fates Original Soundtrack ===
Final Fantasy Crystal Chronicles: Ring of Fates Original Soundtrack is the soundtrack album of Final Fantasy Crystal Chronicles: Ring of Fates, containing all of the musical tracks from the game, and was composed and produced by Kumi Tanioka. The ending theme song for the game, "A World Without Stars" (星のない世界, Hoshi no Nai Sekai), was sung by Aiko, though it was not included in the album, and Nobuo Uematsu contributed one track to the soundtrack. The soundtrack continues the musical theme of "ancient instruments" prevalent in the Crystal Chronicles soundtrack, but additionally incorporates more modern orchestral instruments such as string and horn pieces. The tracks on the album cover a wide range of emotional themes, from "joyful and whimsical tracks" to "lugubrious emotional tracks" to "bombastic battle tracks". In keeping with the lighthearted nature of the game, any darker-themed tracks are exaggerated to make them less serious. The soundtrack spans 57 tracks, covering a duration of 1:16:06. It was released on September 19, 2007 in Japan by Square Enix bearing the catalog number SQEX-10101. The single for Hoshi no Nai Sekai, released in 2007, sold 112,000 copies and reached #2 on the Oricon singles chart.

Ring of Fates was well received by reviewers; Neal Chandran of RPGFan, although finding the original soundtrack to be "bland", felt that the Crystal Chronicles soundtrack was "quite varied, exciting, and dare I say really freaking good" and praised the variety of styles and moods of the tracks. Chris was also enthusiastic about the soundtrack, praising it as "one of the finest accompaniments to a Final Fantasy game ever produced". He noted, however, that the soundtrack works best as a "flowing" work or accompaniment to the game, with a lack of individual tracks that stood out as memorable. Don of Square Enix Music Online was much harsher towards the soundtrack, terming it an "extremely underwhelming album". He disapproved of the change from the medieval instrumentation to a more orchestral score, and felt that the pieces had much less emotional intensity than the Crystal Chronicles soundtrack.

Track listing

| # | Japanese title | English title | Length |
|---|---|---|---|
| 1. | "Ring of Fates" | "Ring of Fates" | 1:58 |
| 2. | "はじまり" Hajimari | "Beginning" | 0:48 |
| 3. | "ぼくたちの生きる世界" Bokutachi no ikiru sekai | "The World Where We Live" | 1:11 |
| 4. | "平和な日常" Heiwa na nichijou | "Peaceful Everyday" | 1:56 |
| 5. | "裏山の洞窟" Urayama no doukutsu | "The Cave in the Hill Behind Our House" | 1:57 |
| 6. | "モグの個人指導" MOGU no kojinshidou | "Mog's Tutoring" | 1:29 |
| 7. | "一騎打ち!" Ikkiuchi! | "A Duel!" | 2:16 |
| 8. | "お宝ゲット!" Otakara GETTO! | "Got the Treasure!" | 0:20 |
| 9. | "静寂のとき" Seijaku no toki | "A Moment of Silence" | 1:45 |
| 10. | "クリスタルの光" KURISUTARU no hikari | "Light of the Crystal" | 0:51 |
| 11. | "城下町の風景" Joukamachi no fuukei | "Scenery of the Castle Town" | 1:16 |
| 12. | "お買い物" Okaimono | "Shopping" | 1:35 |
| 13. | "捨てられた街" Suterareta machi | "Abandoned Town" | 1:48 |
| 14. | "テテオの想い" TETEO no omoi | "Tilika's Memories" | 1:01 |
| 15. | "教皇ガルデス" Kyoukou GARUDESU | "Pope Galdes" | 1:16 |
| 16. | "モーグリ草を採りに" MOOGURI kusa o tori ni | "Going to Pick Moogle Grass" | 1:30 |
| 17. | "邪悪な影" Jaaku na kage | "Evil Shadow" | 1:33 |
| 18. | "悲しみと絶望と" Kanashimi to zetsubou to | "With Sadness and Despair" | 1:47 |
| 19. | "決意" Ketsui | "Determination" | 0:21 |
| 20. | "勇気を味方に" Yuuki o mikata ni | "Courage From Friends" | 1:08 |
| 21. | "大切な仲間" Taisetsu na nakama | "An Important Comrade" | 0:43 |
| 22. | "汚れた森" Yogoreta mori | "The Tainted Forest" | 1:27 |
| 23. | "森に暮らす者" Mori ni kurasu mono | "The Forest Dweller" | 1:05 |
| 24. | "レベナ・テ・ラ城" REBENA-TE-RA shiro | "Rebena Te Ra Castle" | 1:55 |
| 25. | "水底に暮らす者" Suitei ni kurasu mono | "A City Resting at the Bottom of the Sea" | 1:47 |
| 26. | "ミース暴走" MIISU bousou | "Rambunctious Meeth" | 0:45 |
| 27. | "小さな法衣" Chiisana houi | "A Small Vestment" | 1:05 |
| 28. | "罪人の島" Zainin no shima | "Island of Sinners" | 2:00 |
| 29. | "戦闘" Sentou | "Battle" | 1:34 |
| 30. | "幽世～かくりよ～" Yuusei ~Kakuri yo~ | "The Underworld" | 1:38 |
| 31. | "御霊の管理人" Mitama no kanrinin | "The Caretaker of Souls" | 0:53 |
| 32. | "憑かれた父" Tsukarareta chichi | "Father Possessed" | 0:48 |
| 33. | "レラ・シエル" RERA SHIERU | "Rela Ciel" | 1:41 |
| 34. | "都の崩壊" Miyako no houkai | "The City's Collapse" | 0:18 |
| 35. | "クリスタルの存在" KURISUTARU no sonzai | "Existence of the Crystal" | 1:35 |
| 36. | "クリスタルの神殿" KURISUTARU no shinden | "Temple of the Crystal" | 1:47 |
| 37. | "月の神殿" Tsuki no shinden | "Temple of the Moon" | 1:51 |
| 38. | "最終決戦" Saishuu kessen | "Final Decisive Battle" | 1:52 |
| 39. | "自尊心の崩壊" Jisonshin no houkai | "Destruction of the Ego" | 0:29 |
| 40. | "クリスタルレコード" KURISUTARU RECOODO | "Crystal Records" | 1:59 |
| 41. | "絆" Kizuna | "Bonds" | 2:00 |
| 42. | "ぼくが想い焦がれた場所" Boku ga omoikogareta basho | "The Place I Yearned For" | 2:47 |
| 43. | "おかえり...ただいま" Okaeri...Tadaima | "Finally... We're Home" | 0:29 |
| 44. | "フィナーレ" FINAARE | "Finale" | 2:12 |
| 45. | "キャラメイキング" KYARA MEIKINGU | "Character Making" | 1:24 |
| 46. | "みんなでクエスト!その1" Minna de KUESUTO! Sono 1 | "Quest Together! No. 1" | 1:47 |
| 47. | "レベルアップ" REBERU APPU | "Level Up" | 0:06 |
| 48. | "ゲームオーバー" GEEMU OOBAA | "Game Over" | 0:14 |
| 49. | "みんなでクエスト!その2" Minna de KUESUTO! Sono 2 | "Quest Together! No. 2" | 1:17 |
| 50. | "ごほうび争奪戦" Gohoubi soudatsusen | "Prize Contest" | 0:18 |
| 51. | "レーススタート!" REESU SUTAATO! | "Race Start!" | 0:06 |
| 52. | "レースとお立ち台" REESU to otachidai | "The Race and the Royal Balcony" | 0:46 |
| 53. | "レース勝利" REESU shouri | "Race Victory" | 0:05 |
| 54. | "レース...負け" REESU make | "Race Defeat" | 0:07 |
| 55. | "おでかけモーグリ" Odekake MOOGURI | "A Moogle Outing" | 1:18 |
| 56. | "RoFメドレー" RoF MEDOREE | "RoF Medley" | 3:40 |
| 57. | "Memories of Ring of Fates" | "Memories of Ring of Fates" | 2:28 |

=== Final Fantasy Crystal Chronicles: Echoes of Time Original Soundtrack ===
Final Fantasy Crystal Chronicles: Echoes of Time Original Soundtrack is the soundtrack album of Final Fantasy Crystal Chronicles: Echoes of Time, containing the majority of the musical tracks from the game, and was composed by Kumi Tanioka. It was released by Square Enix on February 18, 2009. Like previous Crystal Chronicles soundtracks, Echoes incorporates a variety of instruments, including oboes, xylophones, marimbas and Latin guitars. Unlike the previous Crystal Chronicles soundtracks, the Echoes does not include a theme song. The soundtrack spans 51 tracks over 2 discs, covering a duration of 2:07:30, and has the catalog numbers SQEX-10137~8.

Track listing

Disc one

| # | Japanese title | English title | Length |
|---|---|---|---|
| 1. | メインテーマ | "Main Theme" | 1:45 |
| 2. | Echoes of Time | "Echoes of Time" | 0:50 |
| 3. | 悠久の歴史 | "Eternal History" | 1:50 |
| 4. | 村の日常 | "The Everyday Life of a Village" | 2:57 |
| 5. | 森 | "Forest" | 4:12 |
| 6. | ボス TYPE-A | "Boss TYPE-A" | 2:44 |
| 7. | クリスタルコア | "Crystal Core" | 0:43 |
| 8. | 街 | "Road" | 3:13 |
| 9. | 用水路 | "Canal" | 2:35 |
| 10. | 氷の山 | "Ice Mountain" | 2:49 |
| 11. | 炎の山 | "Flame Mountain" | 3:00 |
| 12. | はじまりの時 | "The Time of the Beginning" | 1:16 |
| 13. | 古代図書館 | "Ancient Library" | 3:47 |
| 14. | ボス TYPE-B | "Boss TYPE-B" | 3:01 |
| 15. | 砂漠遺跡 | "Desert Ruins" | 4:06 |
| 16. | ベリアウルデ | "Beriaurude" | 2:42 |
| 17. | クリスタルマージ | "Crystal Merge" | 0:10 |
| 18. | なんかもらった！ | "Got it!" | 0:08 |
| 19. | memories tomorrow | "memories tomorrow" | 2:46 |
| 20. | 昔日の森 | "Forest of the Old Days" | 3:10 |
| 21. | 長い時間の果てに | "At the End of a Long Time" | 3:41 |
| 22. | シェルロッタ | "Sherlotta" | 4:39 |
| 23. | 墓地 | "Graveyard" | 4:44 |
| 24. | 採掘場 | "Mining Place" | 3:23 |
| 25. | 古の橋 | "Ancient Bridge" | 0:57 |

Disc two

| # | Japanese title | English title | Length |
|---|---|---|---|
| 1. | 冒険へ | "Into the Adventure" | 2:24 |
| 2. | 塔へ続く橋 | "The Bridge Reaching to the Tower" | 3:51 |
| 3. | 塔 | "Tower" | 3:02 |
| 4. | ラーケイクス | "Larkeicus" | 2:39 |
| 5. | 最終決戦 | "Last Battle" | 5:59 |
| 6. | 大いなる誤算 | "Big Miscalculation" | 2:18 |
| 7. | 始原創造 | "The Creation of the Origin" | 2:41 |
| 8. | 家族の団らん | "Family Get-Together" | 2:38 |
| 9. | 成人の儀 | "Adult Ceremony" | 0:42 |
| 10. | 祝福 | "Blessing" | 0:35 |
| 11. | フィナーレ | "Finale" | 2:36 |
| 12. | キャラメイク | "Character Make" | 2:31 |
| 13. | みんなでクエスト！その1 | "Quest Together! 1st" | 3:06 |
| 14. | 一騎討ち！ | "One-on-One Duel!" | 4:01 |
| 15. | みんなでクエスト！その2 | "Quest Together! 2nd" | 2:11 |
| 16. | 戦闘 | "Battle" | 2:37 |
| 17. | みんなでクエスト！その3 | "Quest Together! 3rd" | 2:47 |
| 18. | ガルデス戦 | "Galdes Battle" | 3:14 |
| 19. | お宝ゲット！ | "Treasure Get!" | 0:24 |
| 20. | ごほうび争奪戦 | "Reward Competition" | 0:16 |
| 21. | モグの個人指導 | "Mog's Personal Guidance" | 2:30 |
| 22. | お買い物 | "Shopping" | 2:43 |
| 23. | ゲームオーバー | "Game Over" | 0:13 |
| 24. | お立ち台 | "Stand" | 1:26 |
| 25. | 成人の儀 Remix | "Adult Ceremony Remix" | 2:44 |
| 26. | Play riddles 〜遺跡 Remix〜 | "Play riddles ~Ruins Remix~" | 2:29 |

=== Final Fantasy Crystal Chronicles: The Crystal Bearers Original Soundtrack ===
Final Fantasy Crystal Chronicles: The Crystal Bearers Original Soundtrack is the soundtrack album of Final Fantasy Crystal Chronicles: Crystal Bearers, containing the majority of the musical tracks from the game, composed by Hidenori Iwasaki and Ryo Yamazaki, with the vocal talent of Donna Burke. The soundtrack spans 70 tracks over 2 discs.

Track listing

Disc 1
| No. | Title | Japanese title | Length |
|---|---|---|---|
| 1. | "Moonlight Serenade" | 月光小夜曲 ～Moonlight Serenade～ | 0:45 |
| 2. | "Crystal Bearers Ramble" | クリスタルベアラーランブル | 2:49 |
| 3. | "The Sacred Haven" | 聖なる安息の地 | 1:46 |
| 4. | "Zu Ambush ~ Sky Dive!" | スカイダイブ！ | 2:01 |
| 5. | "Trouble Up Ahead" | Trouble Up Ahead | 1:58 |
| 6. | "An Unlikely Guest" | 招かれざるもの | 0:54 |
| 7. | "Unknown Enemy" | Unknown Enemy | 1:46 |
| 8. | "Emergency!" | エマージェンシー！ | 3:44 |
| 9. | "The Royal Army" | 王国軍 | 1:35 |
| 10. | "Alfitaria Capital City" | 王都アルフィタリア | 3:33 |
| 11. | "Althea" | アルテア | 1:27 |
| 12. | "Together on the Run" | Together on the Run | 0:32 |
| 13. | "Getaway" | ランナウェイ | 3:26 |
| 14. | "Ruins" | 遺跡 | 2:37 |
| 15. | "The World is Changing" | リザレクション | 2:09 |
| 16. | "Lett Highlands" | レト平原 | 2:48 |
| 17. | "Catch and Throw" | Catch and Throw | 2:43 |
| 18. | "The Pioneer Spirit" | 荒野 ～Eastern Wildlands～ | 2:43 |
| 19. | "Neighborhood Tinkerer" | シド | 1:55 |
| 20. | "Bridge Town" | 橋の街 | 1:03 |
| 21. | "High Commander" | 参謀長 | 2:14 |
| 22. | "Chase The Hostile" | 追跡 | 1:07 |
| 23. | "The Lost Tribe" | 失われた種族 | 1:51 |
| 24. | "Bahamut Strikes" | バハムートストライク | 1:49 |
| 25. | "Bahamut's Rage" | バハムートの怒り | 2:33 |
| 26. | "Prison Sands" | Prison Sands | 2:04 |
| 27. | "Snarky Tough Guy" | Snarky Tough Guy | 2:29 |
| 28. | "Surfin' Layle" | サーフィン レイル | 2:26 |
| 29. | "Selkie Guild" | セルキーズギルド | 2:29 |
| 30. | "Costa Faguita" | コスタ・ファギータ | 2:25 |
| 31. | "Girls, We Have to Win!" | Girls, We Have to Win! | 2:25 |
| 32. | "Belle Handles it Solo" | ベル | 1:04 |
| 33. | "Crystal Locomotive" | セルキートレイン | 2:32 |
| 34. | "Authority" | 権力 | 1:08 |
| 35. | "Hide and Seek" | ハイド&シーク | 2:32 |
| 36. | "Dig! Dig! Dig!" | Dig! Dig Dig! | 1:24 |
| 37. | "Jingle Medley" | ジングルメドレー | 0:42 |

Disc 2
| No. | Title | Japanese title | Length |
|---|---|---|---|
| 1. | "Beyond the Horizon" | Beyond the Horizon | 2:31 |
| 2. | "Raging Ambition" | 燃え上がる野望 | 1:54 |
| 3. | "The Awakened Beast" | バレットレイン | 2:27 |
| 4. | "Snowfields" | 雪原 | 2:59 |
| 5. | "Freezing Heat" | Freezing Heat | 2:21 |
| 6. | "Rivelgauge Monastery" | リベルゴーシュ修道院 | 2:19 |
| 7. | "Vineyard" | 小さなドメーヌ | 2:33 |
| 8. | "Queen's Garden" | 王都庭園 | 2:53 |
| 9. | "Kickerbaul" | ケッカバウ | 2:22 |
| 10. | "Chocobo" | チョコボ | 1:53 |
| 11. | "Infiltration" | 潜入 | 1:58 |
| 12. | "Althea's Waltz" | アルテアワルツ | 3:10 |
| 13. | "Moonless Starry Night" | 星月夜 | 1:47 |
| 14. | "Veo Lu Sluice" | 約束のうるおい | 1:37 |
| 15. | "A Moment of Repose" | 休息 | 1:07 |
| 16. | "Existence and Oblivion" | 存在と不在の狭間 | 2:31 |
| 17. | "Moogle Woods" | モーグリの森 | 2:31 |
| 18. | "Aerial Prison" | 浮遊監獄 | 2:34 |
| 19. | "Blockade Buster" | Blockade Buster | 2:23 |
| 20. | "The Taint of Power" | クリスタルストライクバック | 1:28 |
| 21. | "Narrow Escape" | 脱出 | 3:46 |
| 22. | "Quiet Lament" | Quiet Lament | 1:26 |
| 23. | "A Hero's Resolve" | A Hero's Resolve | 0:41 |
| 24. | "Hidden Tales of Adventure" | Hidden Tales of Adventure | 2:43 |
| 25. | "Ephemeron" | 儚きもの | 1:54 |
| 26. | "For the Kingdom" | 王国の為に | 1:11 |
| 27. | "Destiny" | 運命 | 2:36 |
| 28. | "Final Showdown" | Final Showdown | 3:05 |
| 29. | "Indomitable" | Indomitable | 3:07 |
| 30. | "This is the End for You!" | This is the End for You! | 3:39 |
| 31. | "Kuule tää unelmain" | 聖なる安息の地 ～Kuule tää unelmain～ | 1:47 |
| 32. | "Majestic Theme" | 栄華なるテーマ | 3:22 |
| 33. | "Leave it to Me!" | オレにまかせろ！ | 0:53 |

=== Piano Collections ===
On April 7, 2021, Square Enix released Piano Collections Final Fantasy Crystal Chronicles to correspond with the release of the remastered edition of Final Fantasy Crystal Chronicles. The ten-track, 40:38 album contains piano arrangements by Kumi Tanioka of her compositions for the game, performed by Tanioka with accompaniment by Yui Morishita on four duets. Patrick Gann of RPGFan heavily praised the album, particularly the duets.

== Singles ==
=== Kaze no Ne ===
"Sound of the Wind" (カゼノネ, Kaze no Ne) is the opening song of Final Fantasy Crystal Chronicles, composed by Kumi Tanioka and performed by Yae. It was released as a single by Pony Canyon, featuring the "Kaze No Ne" song, an arranged version, and two other songs by Yae from her album Blue Line, "Carol (scat)" and "Flower of Love" (恋の花, Koi no Hana). The single was released on July 30, 2003, has a length of 14:12, and has a catalog number of PCCA-01915. While "Kaze No Ne" follows the medieval theme of the rest of the Crystal Chronicles soundtrack, the arranged version is a more "produced" techno-sounding track. The two unrelated tracks are vocal and instrumental pieces, with "Carol" as a scat song, and "Flower of Love" more of a slower "ethnic/world" piece.

Patrick Gann of RPGFan called "Kaze no Ne" one of the few singles he had purchased that was "worth holding onto". He described all of the tracks as "beautiful", and felt that the arranged version of "Sound of the Wind" was "charming and enigmatic". Dave of Square Enix Music Online concurred, calling the single "a potentially excellent addition to anyone's discography". He described Yae's voice as "angelic" "mature" and "fresh" and summed up the album as "a definitive Yae experience accessible to game music fans".

=== Hoshi no Nai Sekai / Yokogao ===
"Hoshi no Nai Sekai"/"Yokogao" is double A-side containing the theme song to Final Fantasy Crystal Chronicles: Ring of Fates "A World Without Stars" (星のない世界, Hoshi no Nai Sekai), as well as two original tracks, "Profile" (横顔, Yokogao) and "Love" (恋愛, Renai), and instrumental versions of "A World Without Stars" and "Profile". The single is performed by Aiko. All of the songs are primarily focused on the vocals along with piano and electric guitar accompaniments. "A World Without Stars" is a primarily piano-based song with lyrics in Japanese, while "Profile" and "Love" are mid-tempo pop songs. The album was released on August 22, 2007 by Pony Canyon, covers a duration of 24:40, and has the catalog number PCCA-02546.

Neal Chandran approved of "Hoshi no Nai Sekai" / "Yokogao", finding it to be enjoyable despite its short length. He felt that "A World Without Stars" was a "terrific piece, and that the other two songs, while "not as strong", were "still decent tracks that were easy on the ears", and approved of the instrumental versions included in the single. Don also appreciated the soundtrack, calling it "a nice choice" and saying that it "complements a rather weak original soundtrack". He felt that the balance in the songs between the piano and electric guitar was well done.

Track listing

| # | Japanese title | English title | Length |
|---|---|---|---|
| 1. | "星のない世界" Hoshi no Nai Sekai | "A World Without Stars" | 5:30 |
| 2. | "横顔" Yokogao | "Profile" | 5:05 |
| 3. | "恋愛" Renai | "Love" | 4:30 |
| 4. | "星のない世界" (instrumental) | "A World Without Stars" (instrumental) | 5:29 |
| 4. | "横顔" (instrumental) | "Profile" (instrumental) | 5:02 |

== Legacy ==
Unlike the soundtracks to the numbered Final Fantasy games, no songs from the Crystal Chronicles soundtracks have appeared in any compilation albums produced by Square Enix. Songs from the series have also not appeared in any of the official Final Fantasy music concerts, although "Morning Sky" from the Crystal Chronicles soundtrack was played in the first Games in Concert performance in Utrecht, Netherlands on November 26, 2006. It was performed by Floor Jansen of the band After Forever and the Metropole Orchestra.
