= Blue Wing Blitz =

2001 video game

- Developer: Square
- Publisher: Square
- Producer: Akitoshi Kawazu
- Designer: Front Mission team
- Composer: Kumi Tanioka
- Platform: WonderSwan Color (compatible with WonderSwan)
- Release: JP: July 5, 2001
- Genre: Tactical role-playing game
- Mode: Single player

Blue Wing Blitz (ブルーウィングブリッツ) is a Japanese-exclusive tactical role-playing game developed and published by Square on July 5, 2001 for the WonderSwan Color and compatible with the WonderSwan.

Unlike standard tactical video games, Blue Wing Blitz focuses on aerial battles, fought with aircraft, which can be customized. The events of the game begins in the Esk Republic, in an unnamed fictional world. Esk is threatened by the militaristic empire of Ordia, and the player's party is given the mission to repel the invasion.

== Gameplay ==
Units on the grid map.

Blue Wing Blitz is a traditional turn-based tactical role-playing game, although it has the particularity of involving mostly aerial warfare units. These are moved on a grid map, and an encounter with an enemy unit opens a separate, close-up combat screen in which up to two ally units and two enemy units engage in a short dogfight; the player using menu commands to attack, change altitude or take evasive maneuvers.

Different parts of each unit can be damaged, and the success of each attack depends on the units' stats as well as maneuvers. Several ground units are also present on the grid map, and can only be destroyed by bombers. The level of fuel and amount of ammunition of each unit are limited and must be replenished when necessary.

After each mission, aircraft can be upgraded, customized or remodeled with various weapons and equipment developed in factory. Which upgrades are available depends on the player's degree of success in the precedent mission.

== Plot ==
On the ground from left to right: Keid, Blore, and Poty. On the aircraft from left to right: Rayetta, Payer, Sersh, and Roster.

=== Setting ===
The fictional world of Blue Wing Blitz is composed of floating islands, and usage of aircraft is widespread. Most of the islands are owned and ruled by the expansionist Ordia Empire, which possess superior aircraft. One of the independent states is the Esk Republic, a rich agrarian nation which supplies food to other countries, such as the United Federation of Roggina or the Kingdoms of Mackai and Peag. At the beginning of the game, Trund, the Prime Minister of Esk, assembles a rebel force to reclaim territories menaced by Ordia.

=== Characters ===
The players controls the members of Esk's rebel force, who each have a distinct aircraft. The main character of the game is a sixteen-year-old pilot trainee named Keid, from Tadaga Village, while the second playable character is Payer, a female senior pilot of the same age. She volunteers to defend Tadaga from enemy armies and meets Keid, who becomes enlisted in the rebel force as an officer. The third playable character, Havilan, is a veteran piloting a flying gunboat.

Other playable characters include notably Blore, a strategist and devoted pilot of the royal air force of Mackai; and Rayetta, his younger sister and bomber pilot. Roster, an ally of Ordia who secretly leads the Roggina Spirit resistance also joins the player's party; as does Poty, the fourth prince of Peag and bomber pilot, and his female guard Sersh.

== Development ==
Blue Wing Blitz was officially announced in March 2001, and was Square's second original title for Bandai's Japan-exclusive handheld console WonderSwan Color, after Wild Card. A trailer of the game was featured in the bonus DVD included in the Japanese release of Final Fantasy X.

The game was developed by the same team responsible for the Front Mission series, while the characters were designed by Nobuyuki Ikeda. The score for the game, which was never released in album form, was composed by Kumi Tanioka and was the first time that she composed a soundtrack entirely by herself.

A 95-page official strategy guide, titled Blue Wing Blitz Freedom Fighter's Guide, was published by DigiCube on the same date as the game. The contents include information on the characters and the setting, battle system explanations, map screenshots, and reference and data tables.

== Reception ==
Blue Wing Blitz sold poorly, with around 20,000 units sold one year after its release. In a preview of the title, the gaming website GIA praised the graphics of the game, stating that Nobuyuki Ikeda's character designs "add style and charm" to the battles and cutscenes despite simple field graphics and the console's technical limitations. RPGamer noted that the game's focus on aircraft was an "interesting new take on a classic concept". 1UP.com's Jeremy Parish used Blue Wing Blitz as an example of one of the WonderSwan's major games.
