= Kumi Tanioka =

Japanese composer and pianist (born 1974)

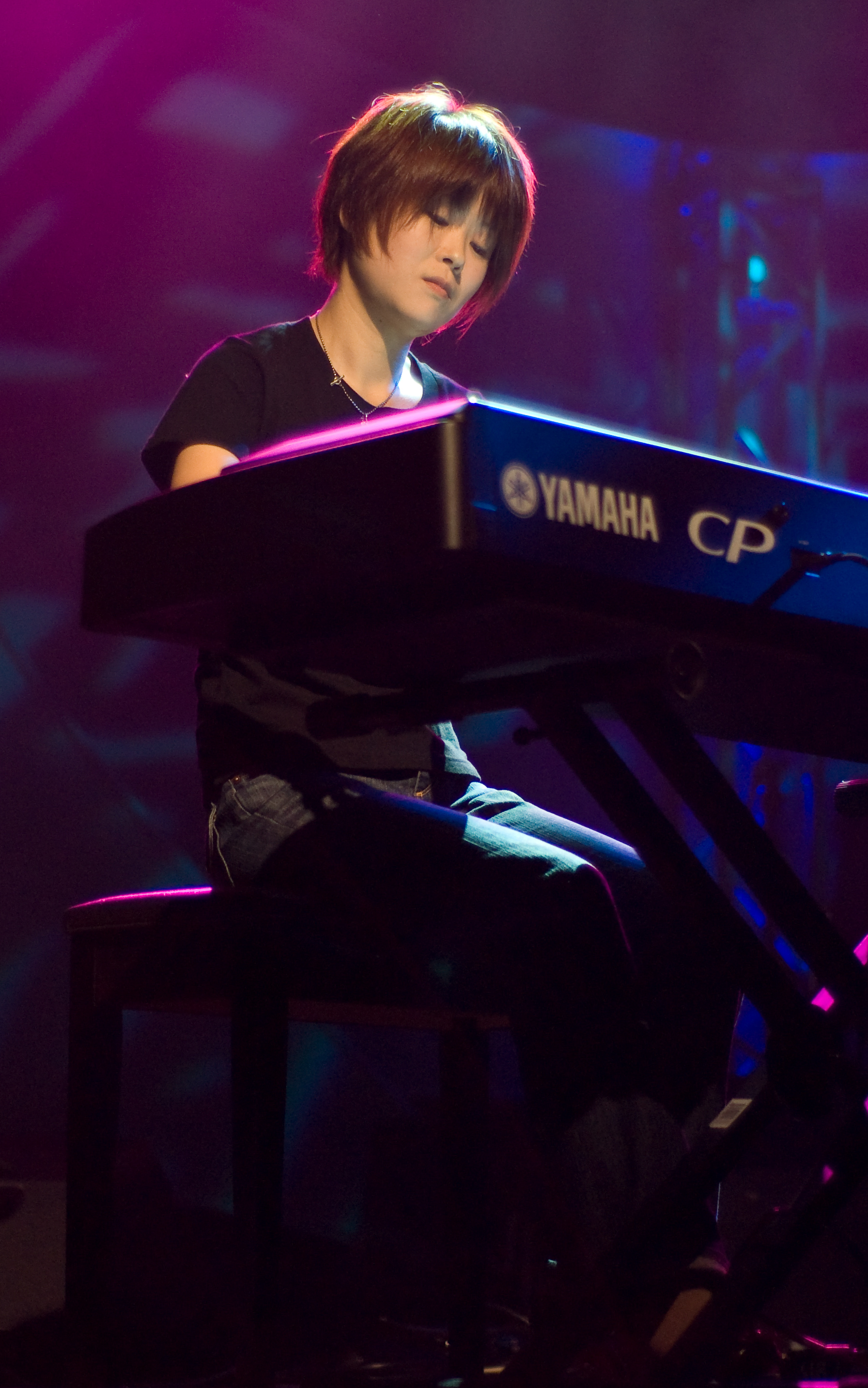
- Tanioka in 2007
- Born: August 29, 1974 (age 52); Hiroshima, Japan
- Education: Kobe University
- Occupations: Composer, pianist
- Years active: 1997–present
- Musical career
- Genre: Video game music
- Instrument: Piano

Kumi Tanioka (谷岡久美, Tanioka Kumi; born August 29, 1974) is a Japanese composer and pianist. Born in Hiroshima, Japan, she graduated from Kobe University with a degree in musical performance, and began working as a video game composer in 1998. She joined video game developer and publisher Square that same year, and worked on over 15 games for them before leaving to work as an independent composer in 2010.

Tanioka is best known for composing for the Final Fantasy Crystal Chronicles series. She also likes to incorporate piano music into her soundtracks, which she typically performs herself, as she has done as a part of The Star Onions, a musical group focusing on arrangements of Final Fantasy XI music as well at various concerts.

== Biography ==
=== Early life ===
Tanioka was born in Hiroshima, Japan, where she studied music and composition while in school and enjoyed listening to video game music as her younger brother was a gamer. Among the composers she grew familiar with were Square employees Hitoshi Sakimoto, Nobuo Uematsu and Kenji Ito. Her favorite pianists at the time were Piotr Paleczny and Hiromi Uehara. Tanioka attended Kobe University, where she studied music and joined a choir. She graduated with a degree in musical performance. Although she had planned on performing music as a career, during college she became more interested in composing than performance, and in video game composition because of her childhood experiences. After graduating, she joined Square (now Square Enix) as a composer in 1998.

=== Career ===
Tanioka's first game works were sound effects for the Psikyo games Taisen Hot Gimmick and The Fallen Angels, released in 1997 and 1998 respectively. Later in 1998, she joined Square and composed her first soundtrack to a game in the Chocobo series, Chocobo's Dungeon 2, with Yasuhiro Kawakami, Tsuyoshi Sekito and Kenji Ito. Her second work in the series was also her first solo soundtrack, that of Dice de Chocobo, a video game adaption of a board game. She composed for two other projects over the next two years, All Star Pro-Wrestling with Tsuyoshi Sekito and Kenichiro Fukui and Blue Wing Blitz by herself. Her first major composing role was in 2002, when she was one of three composers chosen to write the soundtrack to Final Fantasy XI. Although she did not contribute more than one song to the multiple expansions to the game, during this period she joined The Star Onions, a band made of Square Enix composers that arranges and performs Final Fantasy XI music. The group has released two albums to date.

After Final Fantasy XI, she composed the soundtrack to Final Fantasy Crystal Chronicles, which led to her composing the soundtracks to the other five games in the series. Between the games, she worked on the soundtracks to Code Age Commanders, Code Age Brawls, Project Sylpheed, and Final Fantasy Fables: Chocobo's Dungeon. On February 28, 2010, Tanioka announced her departure from Square Enix, following several other Square Enix composers such as Kenichiro Fukui, Junya Nakano, and Masashi Hamauzu; she joined the composer's group GE-ON-DAN with many other composers like Nakano. In 2011, she became one of the founding members of Ringmasters, a non-exclusive worldwide group of artists and composers, though she later left the group. She composed in 2011 music for iOS interactive storybooks, Snow White, The Ugly Duckling, and Hansel and Gretel, before founding her own independent company, Riquismo, in August 2012. Riquismo is not a full studio, and Tanioka continues to work independently. Tanioka has said that she decided to become a freelance composer because she wanted to write for a wider variety of subjects. Since its founding she has composed music for Ragnarok Odyssey, for which she wrote independently of any prior music from the Ragnarok series, and MA.YU.MO.RI.

Unlike the soundtracks to the numbered Final Fantasy games, no songs from the Crystal Chronicles or Chocobo soundtracks have appeared in any compilation albums produced by Square Enix. Songs from the two series have also not appeared in any of the official Final Fantasy music concerts, although "Morning Sky" from the Crystal Chronicles soundtrack was played in the first Games in Concert performance in Utrecht, Netherlands on November 26, 2006. It was performed by Floor Jansen of the band After Forever, Nightwish and the Metropole Orchestra.

== Musical style and influences ==
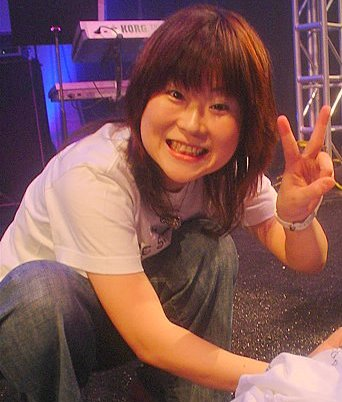
Tanioka in 2007

Kumi Tanioka's signature style, especially for the Crystal Chronicles games, is that of "world music". She has described the musical style for the soundtrack to Final Fantasy Crystal Chronicles as being based on "ancient instruments". The soundtrack has extensive use of many medieval and renaissance musical instruments like the recorder, the crumhorn and the lute, creating a distinctively rustic feel, and also follows the practices and styles of medieval music. She says the idea came to her while looking at illustrations of the game world, which gave her the idea of making "world music", where the tracks would "not [be] limited to a single country or culture". She feels that specific instruments do not necessarily need to be tied to a specific geographic region, and tries to see, for example, how an Indian instrument and a Celtic instrument might work with each other.

For the soundtrack to Ring of Fates, Tanioka tried to focus on "creating a new landscape containing the same atmosphere". She returned to using instruments in an "ethnic manner" again in composing the soundtrack for Echoes of Time. The piano performances in the Ring of Fates soundtrack were done by Kumi Tanioka. She did the performances herself rather than use an outside performer as most Final Fantasy soundtracks have done primarily because she "likes to play piano", and they were done without any sheet music, as she preferred instead to improvise. She took extensive piano lessons as a child, and lists piano and choral music as the biggest influences on her musical style. She also claims to have been influenced by music from a wide variety of cultures, like Indonesian, Irish and Balinese music. Tanioka has performed live at several events, including 2011's Final Fantasy XI-themed VanaCon or 2021's Tokyo Game Show for the Final Fantasy Crystal Chronicles Remaster; she likes to do live performances as she feels it connects her with the listener's response to her music, unlike when composing where she can only imagine audience's responses to hearing her music.

== Works ==
Works
Year	Title	Notes
1997	Taisen Hot Gimmick	Sound effects
1998	The Fallen Angels	Sound effects
1998	Chocobo's Dungeon 2	Music with Yasuhiro Kawakami, Tsuyoshi Sekito, and Kenji Ito
1999	Dice de Chocobo	Music
2000	All Star Pro-Wrestling	Music with Tsuyoshi Sekito and Kenichiro Fukui
2001	Blue Wing Blitz	Music
2002	Final Fantasy XI	Music with Naoshi Mizuta and Nobuo Uematsu
2003	Final Fantasy Crystal Chronicles	Music with Hidenori Iwasaki
2005	Code Age Commanders	Music with Yasuhiro Yamanaka
2005	Code Age Brawls	Music
2006	Project Sylpheed	Music with various others
2007	Final Fantasy Crystal Chronicles: Ring of Fates	Music
2008	Final Fantasy Fables: Chocobo's Dungeon	Music ("Labyrinth of Forgotten Time", "Opening")
2008	Final Fantasy Crystal Chronicles: My Life as a King	Music
2009	Final Fantasy Crystal Chronicles: Echoes of Time	Music
2009	Final Fantasy Crystal Chronicles: My Life as a Darklord	Music
2009	Final Fantasy Crystal Chronicles: The Crystal Bearers	Music with Hidenori Iwasaki and Ryo Yamazaki
2010	Mario Sports Mix	Music with Masayoshi Soken
2011	Half-Minute Hero: The Second Coming	Music ("End of Overture", "End of Judgement")
2012	Harvest Moon: A New Beginning	Music
2012	Ragnarok Odyssey	Music
2013	MA.YU.MO.RI	Music
2013	Saga of Fantasm:A	Music with Nobuo Uematsu, Yoshitaka Hirota, and Tsutomu Narita
2014	Kakuriyo no Mon	Music ("Jindai Yori Tsutawarishi Denshō")
2014	Super Smash Bros. for Nintendo 3DS and Wii U	Arrangements (Note: "Plaza / Title (Animal Crossing: City Folk / Animal Crossing: Wild World)", "Jogging/Countdown")
2015	Airship Q	Music
2018	Final Fantasy Record Keeper	DLC; arrangements with various others
2018	Super Smash Bros. Ultimate	Arrangements (Note: "Snakey Chantey", "Molgera", "Main Menu - Wii Fit")
2020	Final Fantasy Crystal Chronicles: Remastered Edition	Music
2020	Hyrule Warriors: Age of Calamity	Music with several others
2021	Minecraft: Caves & Cliffs	Music with Lena Raine
2023	Atelier Marie Remake: The Alchemist of Salburg	Arrangements with Ryotaro Yagi
2024	Minecraft: Tricky Trials	Music with Lena Raine and Aaron Cherof
2025	Sonic Wings Reunion	Arrangement ("Hidden Boss 2"; with Yuka Fujino)
2026	Yoshi and the Mysterious Book	Music

== See also ==
- Music of the Chocobo series
- Music of Final Fantasy XI
- Music of the Final Fantasy Crystal Chronicles series
