= Music of Final Fantasy XI =

Music from the video game Final Fantasy XI

The music of the MMORPG Final Fantasy XI was composed by Naoshi Mizuta along with regular series composer Nobuo Uematsu and Kumi Tanioka. The Final Fantasy XI Original Soundtrack, a compilation of almost all of the music in the game, was released by DigiCube in 2002, and subsequently re-released by Square Enix in 2004. Final Fantasy XI Rise of the Zilart Original Soundtrack was released by DigiCube in 2003 after the release of the Rise of the Zilart expansion for Final Fantasy XI, and re-released by Square Enix in 2004. Final Fantasy XI Chains of Promathia Original Soundtrack was produced by Square Enix in 2004 after the release of the Chains of Promathia expansion, and in 2005 Square Enix published Music from the Other Side of Vana'diel, a collection of arranged tracks from the game performed by The Star Onions, a group composed of Square Enix composers including Naoshi Mizuta, Kumi Tanioka and Hidenori Iwasaki. Final Fantasy XI Treasures of Aht Urhgan Original Soundtrack was released by Square Enix in 2006 for the Treasures of Aht Urhgan expansion.

In 2007, Square Enix released the Final Fantasy XI Original Soundtrack Premium Box, a collection of all of the previously released albums, as well as the as yet unreleased Final Fantasy XI Unreleased Tracks and Piano Collections Final Fantasy XI, an album of unreleased music from the game and its expansions and an album of piano arrangements of music from the game, respectively. After the release of the fourth expansion for the game, Final Fantasy XI Wings of the Goddess Original Soundtrack was released in 2008 by Square Enix. Additionally, in summer 2008 another Piano Collections Final Fantasy XI album, completely separate from the previous piano collections album, will be released by Square Enix.

The music has received mixed reviews; while reviewers have praised some of the associated albums such as Final Fantasy XI Rise of the Zilart Original Soundtrack and Final Fantasy XI Treasures of Aht Urhgan Original Soundtrack, other albums, such as Final Fantasy XI Chains of Promathia Original Soundtrack and Music from the Other Side of Vana'diel, were not as universally liked. Several songs, especially "Distant Worlds", remain popular today, and have been performed numerous times in orchestral concert series, as well as being published in arranged and compilation albums by Square as well as outside groups.

== Creation and influence ==
The music of Final Fantasy XI was scored by Nobuo Uematsu, Naoshi Mizuta, and Kumi Tanioka. Composer Yasunori Mitsuda was also asked to contribute, but he was busy scoring Xenosaga. The expansion packs were scored by Mizuta alone after Tanioka left to pursue other projects and Uematsu left Square Enix, although their names remain in the credits for those albums due to the inclusion of versions of songs they had previously composed for the game. The opening of the game features choral music with lyrics in Esperanto. According to Uematsu, the choice of language was meant to symbolize the developers' hope that their online game could contribute to cross-cultural communication and cooperation. He also noted the increased difficulty of scoring a game for which there was no linear plotline, a major change from the previous Final Fantasy games. It was the first game in the series for which he composed while he was no longer a Square employee. New music has been employed for special events, such as a holiday score titled Jeuno -Starlight Celebration- which can be heard in the city of Jeuno each mid to late December since 2004. Some of the game's music has been released on iTunes for download, such as the vocal "Distant Worlds", which was released on the Japanese iTunes Music Store on September 13, 2005, having been put in the game in a July 2005 patch.

== Albums ==
=== Final Fantasy XI Original Soundtrack ===
Final Fantasy XI Original Soundtrack

Studio album by Nobuo Uematsu, Naoshi Mizuta, and Kumi Tanioka
- Released: June 5, 2002; May 10, 2004 (re-release)
- Genre: Classical; video game soundtrack
- Length: Disk 1: 56:01; Disk 2: 55:56
- Label: DigiCube; Square Enix (re-release)
- Producer: Nobuo Uematsu

Final Fantasy XI Original Soundtrack is the soundtrack album of Final Fantasy XI. The album contains musical tracks from the game, composed by Nobuo Uematsu, Naoshi Mizuta, and Kumi Tanioka. The soundtrack was released on June 5, 2002, by DigiCube with the catalog numbers SSCX-10069-70, and re-released on May 10, 2004, by Square Enix with the catalog numbers SQEX-10017-8. The album spans 51 tracks over two disks and covers a duration of 1:51:57.

Final Fantasy XI Original Soundtrack reached #25 on the Japan Oricon charts, selling over 13,200 copies It received mixed reviews by critics, with Ben Schweitzer of RPGFan finding it to be a "strong" album, if "slower" and "more repetitive than previous Final Fantasy scores". Liz Maas of RPGFan enjoyed the album, advising any fan of the series, even if not of the game itself, to buy the album. Chris of Square Enix Music Online, however, felt that while it was "not instantly likable" that it had "the potential to become a favorite with multiple listens".

Disc 1
No.	Title	Length
1.	"FFXI Opening Theme (Uematsu)"	6:46
2.	"Vana'diel March (Mizuta)"	3:18
3.	"The Kingdom of San d'Oria (Mizuta)"	4:34
4.	"Ronfaure (Uematsu)"	4:57
5.	"Battle Theme (Mizuta)"	2:17
6.	"Chateau d'Oraguille (Mizuta)"	4:33
7.	"Batallia Downs (Mizuta)"	4:30
8.	"The Republic of Bastok (Tanioka)"	2:53
9.	"Gustaberg (Tanioka)"	4:12
10.	"Metalworks (Tanioka)"	3:02
11.	"Rolanberry Fields (Mizuta)"	2:27
12.	"The Federation of Windurst (Mizuta)"	3:12
13.	"Heavens Tower (Mizuta)"	6:25
14.	"Sarutabaruta (Mizuta)"	2:47
15.	"Battle in the Dungeon (Mizuta)"	2:27
16.	"Sauromugue Champaign (Mizuta)"	5:23
17.	"Mhaura (Mizuta)"	2:51
18.	"Buccaneers (Mizuta)"	1:55
19.	"Battle Theme #2 (Mizuta)"	2:27
20.	"Voyager (Mizuta)"	2:14
21.	"Selbina (Mizuta)"	2:18

Disc 2
No.	Title	Length
1.	"Prelude (Uematsu)"	1:18
2.	"Regeneracy (Tanioka)"	1:10
3.	"Hume Male (Mizuta)"	1:54
4.	"Hume Female (Tanioka)"	1:06
5.	"Elvaan Male (Mizuta)"	1:52
6.	"Elvaan Female (Tanioka)"	1:27
7.	"Tarutaru Male (Mizuta)"	1:27
8.	"Tarutaru Female (Tanioka)"	0:50
9.	"Mithra (Tanioka)"	1:54
10.	"Galka (Mizuta)"	1:40
11.	"Airship (Uematsu)"	2:19
12.	"The Grand Duchy of Jeuno (Mizuta)"	2:23
13.	"Ru'Lude Gardens (Tanioka)"	2:31
14.	"Recollection (Uematsu)"	3:10
15.	"Anxiety (Uematsu)"	2:44
16.	"Battle in the Dungeon #2 (Mizuta)"	1:33
17.	"Blackout (Mizuta)"	0:44
18.	"Mog House (Mizuta)"	3:29
19.	"Hopelessness (Uematsu)"	1:53
20.	"Fury (Tanioka)"	1:37
21.	"Tough Battle (Mizuta)"	3:00
22.	"Sorrow (Uematsu)"	2:38
23.	"Sometime, Somewhere (Uematsu)"	1:47
24.	"Xarcabard (Mizuta)"	4:29
25.	"Despair (Memoro de la Ŝtono) (Uematsu)"	2:26
26.	"Castle Zvahl (Mizuta)"	9:10
27.	"Shadow Lord (Tanioka)"	1:51
28.	"Awakening (Tanioka)"	5:20
29.	"Repression (Memoro de la Ŝtono) (Uematsu)"	3:07
30.	"Vana'diel March #2 (Mizuta)"	4:23

=== Final Fantasy XI Rise of the Zilart Original Soundtrack ===
Final Fantasy XI Rise of the Zilart Original Soundtrack is a soundtrack album of the Final Fantasy XI: Rise of the Zilart expansion. The album contains musical tracks from the game, composed by Naoshi Mizuta and Nobuo Uematsu and arranged by Naoshi Mizuta. The soundtrack was released on May 21, 2003, by DigiCube with the catalog number SSCX-10093, and re-released on September 23, 2004, by Square Enix with the catalog number SQEX-10034. The album spans 19 tracks and covers a duration of 70:12.

Final Fantasy XI Rise of the Zilart Original Soundtrack reached #53 on the Oricon charts and sold nearly 6,700 copies. It was well received by critics such as Patrick Gann of RPGFan, who called it "a solid OST" of "well-developed compositions". Chris of Square Enix Music Online agreed, terming it "a very well-produced soundtrack" and "a consistent and fitting effort".

Track list
No.	Title	Length
1.	"Kazham"	2:38
2.	"Yuhtunga Jungle"	8:16
3.	"Battle Theme #3"	2:16
4.	""Dash de Chocobo" (Uematsu)"	3:29
5.	"Rabao"	4:29
6.	"Altepa Desert"	4:19
7.	"Battle in the Dungeon #3"	2:10
8.	"Grav'iton"	1:50
9.	"Norg"	3:23
10.	"Tough Battle #2"	2:46
11.	"The Sanctuary of Zi'Tah"	4:13
12.	"Ro'Maeve"	4:26
13.	"Hall of the Gods"	4:33
14.	"Fighters of the Crystal"	3:32
15.	"Tu'Lia"	3:55
16.	"Ve'Lugannon Palace"	5:42
17.	"Eald'narche"	1:54
18.	"Belief"	3:29
19.	"End Theme"	2:43

=== Final Fantasy XI Chains of Promathia Original Soundtrack ===
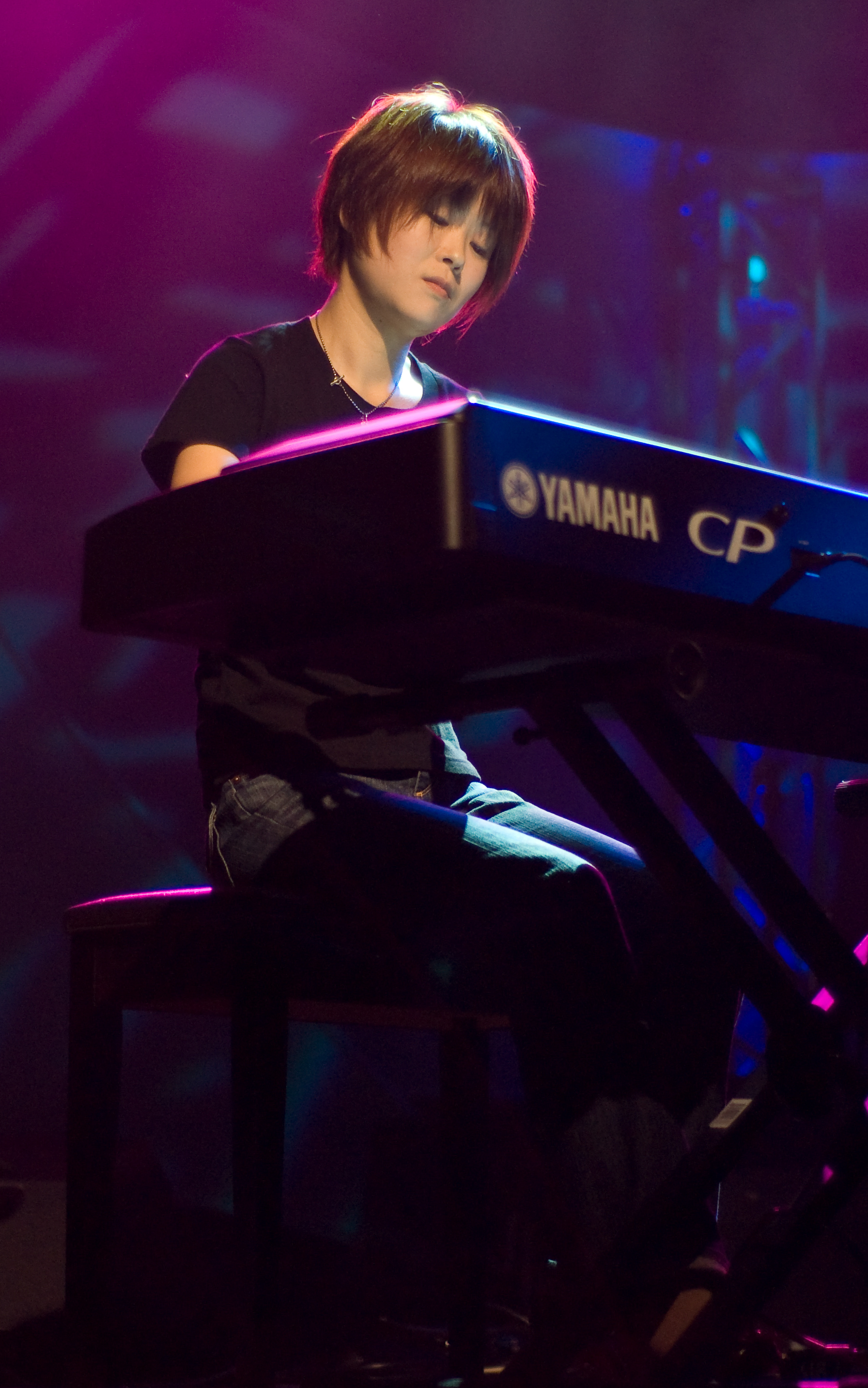
Kumi Tanioka composed and arranged music from Final Fantasy XI and some of its expansions, and is also a member of The Star Onions.

Final Fantasy XI Chains of Promathia Original Soundtrack is a soundtrack album of the Final Fantasy XI: Chains of Promathia expansion. The album contains musical tracks from the game, composed by Naoshi Mizuta, Kumi Tanioka, and Nobuo Uematsu and arranged by Naoshi Mizuta and Kumi Tanioka. The soundtrack was released on November 17, 2004, by Square Enix with the catalog number SQEX-10041. It covers a duration of 78:20 over 24 tracks.

Unlike the first expansion soundtrack, Promathia was not received well by critics, though it reached #57 on the Oricon charts and sold 6,000 copies. Patrick Gann expressed himself as "disappointed" and said that the album was full of "boring, repetitive string-work" instead of Mizuta's usual "strong, raw instrumentation". Chris of Square Enix Music Online termed it "the least accessible Final Fantasy XI soundtrack" and disliked its "grating synth use", but also termed it "an excellent in-game accompaniment".

Track list
No.	Title	Length
1.	"Unity"	1:49
2.	"Moblin Menagerie – Movalpolos"	4:36
3.	"Depths of the Soul"	2:40
4.	"Faded Memories – Promyvion"	5:25
5.	"Currents of Time"	4:23
6.	"First Ode: Nocturne of the Gods (Uematsu)"	0:56
7.	"A New Horizon – Tavnazian Archipelago"	3:32
8.	"Onslaught"	2:23
9.	"The Forgotten City - Tavnazian Safehold"	2:44
10.	"Second Ode: Distant Promises (Uematsu)"	2:31
11.	"The Ruler of the Skies"	1:31
12.	"Turmoil"	2:19
13.	"Third Ode: Memoria de la Stona (Uematsu)"	0:52
14.	"Happily Ever After"	2:40
15.	"Conflict: You Want to Live Forever?"	3:54
16.	"Conflict: March of the Hero"	3:30
17.	"Fourth Ode: Clouded Dawn"	1:43
18.	"Words Unspoken - Pso'Xja"	4:14
19.	"Fifth Ode: A Time for Prayer"	1:39
20.	"The Celestial Capital - Al'Taieu"	7:25
21.	"Gates of Paradise - The Garden of Ru'Hmet"	6:34
22.	"Dusk and Dawn"	2:41
23.	"A New Morning"	4:34
24.	"Gustaberg (Bonus Track)"	3:33

=== Music from the Other Side of Vana'diel ===
Music from the Other Side of Vana'diel is an arranged album of tracks from Final Fantasy XI and its expansions, performed by The Star Onions, a group composed of Square Enix composers, including Naoshi Mizuta, Kumi Tanioka and Hidenori Iwasaki. The album was released by Square Enix on August 24, 2005, under the catalog number SQEX-10050. The album consists of newly arranged versions of songs from Final Fantasy XI and its first two expansions. The album contains 10 tracks and covers a duration of 53:21. The majority of the tracks are smooth jazz, with the exception of Awakening and Blessed in Her Glorious Light - The Grand Duchy of Jeuno, which encompass electronica and gospel respectively.

The album received widely varied reviews by critics and reached #55 on the Oricon charts, selling nearly 8,000 copies. Mike Wilson of RPGFan termed it a "high caliber soundtrack" and said that it was full of "extremely well done" tracks. Ryan Mattich of RPGFan was slightly less impressed, saying that while "each track is a masterpiece", that the album as a whole lacked cohesion. Chris of Square Enix Music Online was much harsher towards the album, finding it to be "fundamentally flawed" due to a lack of coherence and disliked several of the tracks, especially the ones arranged by Mizuta.

Track list
No.	Title	Length
1.	"Vana'diel March"	2:34
2.	"Metalworks (Tanioka)"	6:34
3.	"Rolanberry Fields"	5:55
4.	"Kazham"	6:07
5.	"The Forgotten City - Tavnazian Safehold"	4:16
6.	"Mog House"	3:04
7.	"The Sanctuary of Zi'Tah"	6:03
8.	"Awakening"	5:51
9.	"Selbina"	5:23
10.	"Blessed in Her Glorious Light -The Grand Duchy of Jeuno-"	7:30

=== Final Fantasy XI Treasures of Aht Urhgan Original Soundtrack ===
Final Fantasy XI Treasures of Aht Urhgan Original Soundtrack is a soundtrack album of the Final Fantasy XI: Treasures of Aht Urhgan expansion. The album contains musical tracks from the game, composed by Naoshi Mizuta and Nobuo Uematsu and arranged by Naoshi Mizuta. The soundtrack was released on May 24, 2006, by Square Enix with the catalog number SQEX-10072. It covers a duration of 64:48 over 21 tracks.

Final Fantasy XI Treasures of Aht Urhgan Original Soundtrack was well received by critics, with Patrick Gann describing it as "wonderful", and saying that "nearly every song has its own memorable feel". Chris of Square Enix Music Online agreed, terming it "a solid mixture of continuity and change". It reached position #50 on the Oricon charts.

Track list
No.	Title	Length
1.	"Bustle of the Capital"	4:09
2.	"Eastward Bound..."	3:56
3.	"Bandits' Market"	4:10
4.	"Illusions in the Mist"	4:45
5.	"Mercenaries' Delight"	2:20
6.	"Jeweled Boughs"	4:12
7.	"Ululations from Beyond"	5:11
8.	"Rapid Onslaught -Assault-"	3:02
9.	"Fated Strife -Besieged-"	1:53
10.	"Delve"	1:44
11.	"Whispers of the Gods"	2:57
12.	"Circuit de Chocobo (Uematsu)"	3:43
13.	"Run Chocobo, Run! (Uematsu)"	1:30
14.	"The Colosseum"	2:37
15.	"Black Coffin"	3:52
16.	"A Puppet's Slumber"	1:34
17.	"Ever-Turning Wheels"	2:27
18.	"Forbidden Seal"	4:29
19.	"Hellriders"	3:08
20.	"Eternal Gravestone"	1:10
21.	"Vana'diel March #4"	2:01

=== Final Fantasy XI Unreleased Tracks ===
Final Fantasy XI Unreleased Tracks is a collection of Final Fantasy XI music composed by Naoshi Mizuta that had not been released as part of any of the official albums for XI or its expansions. It spans 18 tracks and covers a duration of 50:43. It has not been released as a single album, but rather can only be found as part of the Final Fantasy XI Original Soundtrack Premium Box, which was released on March 28, 2007, by Square Enix with the catalog number SQEX-10093. Final Fantasy XI Unreleased Tracks was well received by critics such as Patrick Gann, who said that it was an album full of "interesting pieces".

Track list
No.	Title	Length
1.	"A Road Once Traveled"	2:53
2.	"One Last Time"	3:26
3.	"Eternal Oath"	2:15
4.	"To the Heavens"	1:14
5.	"Bloody Promises"	2:08
6.	"Hook, Line, and Sinker"	1:33
7.	"The Big One"	2:09
8.	"Choc-a-bye Baby"	2:42
9.	"Revenant Maiden"	1:32
10.	"Hidden Truths"	2:20
11.	"Moongate (Memoro de la Stono)"	1:31
12.	"Celestial Thunder"	1:19
13.	"A Realm of Emptiness"	3:50
14.	"Distant Worlds"	5:20
15.	"Jeuno -Starlight Celebration-"	5:10
16.	"Sunbreeze Shuffle"	2:32
17.	"Distant Worlds -Guitar Version-"	5:17
18.	"Ru'Lude Gardens -Star Onions Version-"	3:40

=== Piano Collections Final Fantasy XI ===
Piano Collections Final Fantasy XI is a collection of Final Fantasy XI music composed by Nobuo Uematsu, Naoshi Mizuta, and Kumi Tanioka and arranged for the piano by Kaoru Ishikawa. It spans 10 tracks and covers a duration of 38:42. It has not been released as a single album, but rather can only be found as part of the Final Fantasy XI Original Soundtrack Premium Box, which was released on March 28, 2007, by Square Enix with the catalog number SQEX-10094. The album received varied reviews by critics. Patrick Gann termed it "excellent" and praised the technical skills of the performers, though he disliked the short length of the album. Jillian of Square Enix Music Online, on the other hand, was "disappointed" with the album, finding the arrangements to be "simplistic" and the performances, while good technically, to be lacking in passion. The box set reached #35 on the Oricon charts.

Track list
No.	Title	Length
1.	"The Federation of Windurst"	3:50
2.	"Rabao"	4:16
3.	"Choc-a-bye Baby"	3:19
4.	"Moblin Menagerie - Movalpolos"	3:43
5.	"Battle Theme #2"	2:24
6.	"Faded Memories - Promyvion"	5:09
7.	"Jeweled Boughs"	4:22
8.	"Tu'Lia"	4:05
9.	"Distant Worlds"	5:23
10.	"Vana'diel March #4"	2:16

=== Final Fantasy XI Wings of the Goddess Original Soundtrack ===
Final Fantasy XI Wings of the Goddess Original Soundtrack is a soundtrack album of the Final Fantasy XI: Wings of the Goddess expansion. The album contains musical tracks from the game, composed by Naoshi Mizuta, as well as three bonus tracks containing songs from the Treasures of Aht Urhgan expansion that were not included in the soundtrack. The soundtrack was released on the April 23, 2008 by Square Enix with the catalog number SQEX-10113 and spans a duration of 77:44 over 25 tracks.

Final Fantasy XI Wings of the Goddess Original Soundtrack received mixed reviews from reviewers, with Patrick Gann saying that "it is consistently good, but rarely is it mind-blowing". He did, however, praise Mizuta, saying that "Mizuta has grown...to the point where I imagine he can take on nearly any project". It reached position #47 on the Oricon charts.

Track list
No.	Title	Length
1.	"March of the Allied Forces"	3:02
2.	"Flowers on the Battlefield"	3:31
3.	"Roar of the Battle Drums"	2:55
4.	"Autumn Footfalls"	2:53
5.	"Griffons Never Die"	3:10
6.	"Clash of Standards"	1:56
7.	"Echoes of a Zephyr"	4:00
8.	"Thunder of the March"	4:27
9.	"Encampment Dreams"	4:07
10.	"The Cosmic Wheel"	4:12
11.	"Stargazing"	3:48
12.	"On this Blade"	2:24
13.	"Young Griffons in Flight"	1:45
14.	"Run Maggot, Run!"	4:29
15.	"Cloister of Time and Souls"	1:33
16.	"Royal Wanderlust"	1:35
17.	"Under a Clouded Moon"	2:58
18.	"Where Lords Rule Not"	3:30
19.	"Kindred Cry"	3:24
20.	"Snowdrift Waltz"	3:14
21.	"Troubled Shadows"	5:19
22.	"Wings of the Goddess"	3:18
23.	"Iron Colossus"	2:17
24.	"Ragnarok"	2:53
25.	"An Invisible Crown"	1:16

=== Piano Collections Final Fantasy XI (2008) ===
Piano Collections Final Fantasy XI is a collection of Final Fantasy XI music composed by Nobuo Uematsu and Naoshi Mizuta, arranged for the piano by Kaoru Ishikawa, and performed by Ayumi Iga and Kasumi Ōga. It spans 11 tracks and covers a duration of 41:30. Although it has the same name as the album from the Final Fantasy XI Original Soundtrack Premium Box, it is an entirely separate album. It was released on June 25, 2008, by Square Enix with the catalog number SQEX-10117.

The album was well received by critics, with Patrick Gann praising its "high-quality arrangements, and extremely high-quality recording and production value". It made it to position #25 on the Oricon charts and remained on the charts for four weeks.

Track list
No.	Title	Length
1.	"A New Horizon -Tavnazian Archipelago-"	3:44
2.	"Ronfaure"	6:08
3.	"The Grand Duchy of Jeuno"	2:42
4.	"Whispers of the Gods"	3:29
5.	"Stargazing"	3:43
6.	"Fated Strife -Besieged-"	2:08
7.	"Mercenaries' Delight"	2:47
8.	"The Sanctuary of Zi'Tah"	4:51
9.	"The Cosmic Wheel"	4:29
10.	"Griffons Never Die"	5:06
11.	"Wings of the Goddess"	2:26

=== Sanctuary ===
Sanctuary is the second arranged album of tracks from Final Fantasy XI and its expansions by The Star Onions. The album was released by Square Enix on May 20, 2009, under the catalog number SQEX-10143. The album consists of newly arranged versions of songs from Final Fantasy XI and its first four expansions. The album contains 11 tracks and covers a duration of 52:40. The majority of the tracks are new age, combining the smooth jazz of their previous album with strings, funk, and classical. Sanctuary reached #60 on the Oricon charts. It was well received by Patrick Gann, who termed the arrangements as strong and balanced, and called the total album a "lovely little surprise".

Track list
No.	Title	Length
1.	"Voyager"	4:47
2.	"Flowers on the Battlefield"	4:18
3.	"Xarcabard"	5:16
4.	"Fighters of the Crystal"	3:23
5.	"Faded Memories - Promyvion"	5:47
6.	"Mhaura"	5:32
7.	"Gustaberg"	4:23
8.	"Rapid Onslaught -Assault-"	4:28
9.	"Distant Worlds"	5:11
10.	"Griffons Never Die"	4:57
11.	"Wings of the Goddess"	4:33

=== Memories of Dusk and Dawn ===
Final Fantasy XI 8th Anniversary: Memories of Dusk and Dawn is a compilation album of tracks from the game and its expansions. It was released on May 12, 2010, by Square Enix with the catalog number SQEX-10191. The tracks were selected through a vote by fans, which ended on March 8 the same year. The album has 27 tracks and has a length of 1:18:32. The majority of the tracks have appeared on previous albums, with only some music from the PlayOnline service as newly released. Memories of Dusk and Dawn was noted by Gann as a good "best of" album, but of no use to fans of the music who have other albums from the series; it reached #27 on the Oricon charts when released.

Track list
No.	Title	Length
1.	"POL OPENING"	0:54
2.	"Vana'diel March"	2:54
3.	"Ronfaure"	4:41
4.	"Gustaberg"	4:12
5.	"Selbina"	2:11
6.	"Battle in the Dungeon #2"	1:17
7.	"Shadow Lord"	1:28
8.	"Awakening"	4:55
9.	"Kazham"	2:40
10.	"The Sanctuary of Zi'Tah"	4:14
11.	"Fighters of the Crystal"	3:32
12.	"Belief"	3:28
13.	"A New Horizon - Tavnazian Archipelago"	3:34
14.	"Depths of the Soul"	2:28
15.	"Onslaught"	2:07
16.	"Distant Worlds"	5:20
17.	"Mercenaries' Delight"	1:58
18.	"Jeweled Boughs"	4:11
19.	"Rapid Onslaught -Assault-"	2:34
20.	"Whispers of the Gods"	2:58
21.	"Ragnarok"	2:53
22.	"Vana'diel March #4"	2:03
23.	"Autumn Footfalls"	2:38
24.	"Clash of Standards"	1:32
25.	"The Cosmic Wheel"	3:54
26.	"On this Blade"	2:06
27.	"POL WINDOW"	1:50

=== Final Fantasy XI Original Soundtrack PLUS ===
Final Fantasy XI Original Soundtrack PLUS is a two-disc soundtrack album containing mostly previously unreleased music. The music on the first disc was composed by Naoshi Mizuta and comes from the Wings of the Goddess expansion, the three add-on scenarios and the Abyssea trilogy. The second disc contains the background tracks of the PlayOnline Viewer composed by Noriko Matsueda and Kumi Tanioka of which only two had been previously released as part of the Memories of Dusk and Dawn compilation. The soundtrack was released on November 9, 2011, by Square Enix with the catalog numbers SQEX-10284-5 and spans a duration of 2:15:40 over 40 tracks.

Track list

Disc 1 - Final Fantasy XI
No.	Title	Music	Length
1.	"Wings of Dawn"	Naoshi Mizuta	2:18
2.	"Echoes of Creation"	Mizuta	6:16
3.	"Main Theme - FINAL FANTASY XI Version"	Nobuo Uematsu, Mizuta	6:18
4.	"Luck of the Mog"	Mizuta	3:53
5.	"Feast of the Ladies"	Mizuta	3:27
6.	"Abyssea - Scarlet Skies, Shadowed Plains"	Mizuta	8:34
7.	"Melodies Errant"	Mizuta	3:25
8.	"Shinryu"	Mizuta	5:51
9.	"Summers Lost"	Mizuta	4:40
10.	"Goddess Divine"	Mizuta	5:49
11.	"Everlasting Bonds"	Mizuta	3:52
12.	"An Ode to Heroes Fallen"	Mizuta	2:33

Disc 2 – PlayOnline
No.	Title	Music	Length
1.	"POL OPENING"	Noriko Matsueda	0:53
2.	"Space"	Matsueda	2:41
3.	"Jazz 1"	Matsueda	2:03
4.	"Gin no kaichudokei"	Matsueda	2:55
5.	"Yousei no odori"	Matsueda	2:43
6.	"Yasuragi"	Matsueda	2:38
7.	"Jungle"	Matsueda	2:25
8.	"Henbyoushi"	Matsueda	1:47
9.	"Dance"	Matsueda	3:02
10.	"Honobono"	Matsueda	3:31
11.	"Jazz 2"	Matsueda	2:07
12.	"Dolphin"	Matsueda	3:30
13.	"Daikoukai"	Matsueda	3:51
14.	"Fuwafuwa"	Matsueda	3:10
15.	"Funky monkey"	Matsueda	3:49
16.	"Solid wax"	Matsueda	3:19
17.	"Filter branch"	Matsueda	3:22
18.	"Baby Herbie"	Matsueda	2:09
19.	"Technorider"	Matsueda	2:11
20.	"P'z"	Matsueda	2:08
21.	"Foster Family"	Matsueda	3:26
22.	"Kemushi"	Matsueda	1:29
23.	"Oka no mukouni"	Matsueda	3:25
24.	"Payload Pacific"	Matsueda	3:18
25.	"Tsuioku"	Matsueda	2:48
26.	"Hikari"	Kumi Tanioka	3:27
27.	"Megumi"	Tanioka	3:12
28.	"Minori"	Tanioka	3:26

=== Final Fantasy XI Seekers of Adoulin Original Soundtrack ===
Final Fantasy XI Seekers of Adoulin Original Soundtrack is a soundtrack album of the Final Fantasy XI: Seekers of Adoulin expansion. The album contains musical tracks from the game, composed by Naoshi Mizuta. The soundtrack was released on March 27, 2013, by Square Enix with the catalog number SQEX-10362 and spans a duration of 50:08 over 13 tracks. An additional EP, Forever Today: Final Fantasy XI Seekers of Adoulin OST PLUS, was released for the Seekers of Adoulin expansion by Square Enix on November 11, 2014. The EP was released digitally only and has a catalog number of SQEX-50055. It also contains music composed by Mizuta, and spans a duration of 31:34 over 8 tracks.

Final Fantasy XI Seekers of Adoulin Original Soundtrack received tepid reviews from reviewers, with Derek Heemsbergen of RPGFan calling it "a fine demonstration of how Mizuta has evolved as a musician", though he described several of the tracks as "safe" and "not the best". It reached position #125 on the Oricon charts for one week. Forever Today: Final Fantasy XI Seekers of Adoulin OST PLUS received better reviews, with Patrick Gann of RPGFan terming it a "digital-only nugget of goodness" containing a few solid tracks by Mizuta.

Track list

Original Soundtrack
No.	Title	Length
1.	"A New Direction"	1:51
2.	"Breaking Ground"	5:41
3.	"The Pioneers"	3:23
4.	"The Sacred City of Adoulin"	3:33
5.	"Into Lands Primeval - Ulbuka"	3:55
6.	"Steel Sings, Blades Dance"	2:46
7.	"Arciela"	1:59
8.	"Mog Resort"	5:33
9.	"Water's Umbral Knell"	5:05
10.	"Hades"	4:43
11.	"Keepers of the Wild"	3:38
12.	"Where it All Begins"	4:26
13.	"Provenance Watcher"	3:35

Forever Today
No.	Title	Length
1.	"Forever Today"	5:28
2.	"Worlds Away"	2:38
3.	"Monstrosity"	3:28
4.	"Clouds Over Ulbuka"	2:15
5.	"The Price"	3:40
6.	"Forever Today (EP Ver.)"	5:24
7.	"The Serpentine Labyrinth"	4:02
8.	"The Divine"	4:39

=== Final Fantasy XI Priceless Remembrance ===
Final Fantasy XI Priceless Remembrance is a Blu-Ray soundtrack album containing music from the Rhapsodies of Vana'diel add-on. In addition to musical tracks from the add-on, the album also contains several musical tracks from the original soundtracks and video footage of scenery from the game, as well as MP3 encoded files of the audio tracks.

Track List

It All Started Here
No.	Title	Length
1.	"Through the Woods and Over the Highlands"	15:55
2.	"From Industry to Nature"	12:58
3.	"Footsteps through the Aether"	13:35
4.	"The Brine"	7:16
5.	"On Fate's Wings"	6:47
6.	"The Darkness Without"	11:11
7.	"Home Away from Home"	7:31

The Tale Never Ends
No.	Title	Length
8.	"Rise of the Zilart"	10:49
9.	"Chains of Promathia"	13:51
10.	"Treasures of Aht Urhgan"	12:48
11.	"Wings of the Goddess"	16:05
12.	"Seekers of Adoulin"	14:49

Rhapsodies of Vana'diel
No.	Title	Length
13.	"Forever Today (instrumental version)"	5:36
14.	"Worlds Away"	2:40
15.	"Monstrosity"	3:32
16.	"Clouds over Ulbuka"	2:18
17.	"The Price"	3:42
18.	"Forever Today (EP Ver.)"	5:27
19.	"The Serpentine Labyrinth"	4:04
20.	"The Divine"	4:39
21.	"Forever Today"	5:31
22.	"Distant Worlds (Instrumental Version)"	5:23
23.	"Rhapsodies of Vana'diel EP Ver."	10:29
24.	"Iroha"	2:45
25.	"The Boundless Black"	3:08
26.	"Isle of the Gods"	4:02
27.	"Wail of the Void"	4:59
28.	"Rhapsodies of Vana'diel"	10:32

== Legacy ==
The Black Mages, a band led by Nobuo Uematsu that arranges music from Final Fantasy video games into a rock music style, have arranged "Distant Worlds" in the album Darkness and Starlight, published in 2008. Uematsu continues to perform certain pieces in his Dear Friends: Music from Final Fantasy concert series. The music of Final Fantasy XI has also appeared in various official concerts and live albums, such as the Distant Worlds - Music from Final Fantasy concert tour, where "Opening Theme" and "Distant Worlds" were performed as a medley by the Royal Stockholm Philharmonic Orchestra, while "Ronfaure" was performed by the New Japan Philharmonic Orchestra in the Tour de Japon: Music from Final Fantasy concert series. Selections of music from Final Fantasy XI also appear on Japanese remix albums, called dōjin music, and on English remixing websites.
