= Final Fantasy Crystal Chronicles: Echoes of Time =

2009 video game

- Cover of the Nintendo DS release
- Developer: Square Enix
- Publisher: Square Enix
- Director: Mitsuru Kamiyama
- Designer: Hiroyuki Saegusa
- Artist: Yasuhisa Izumisawa
- Writers: Hiroyuki Saegusa; Miwa Shoda
- Composer: Kumi Tanioka
- Series: Final Fantasy (main); Crystal Chronicles (sub)
- Engine: Pollux Engine
- Platforms: Nintendo DS, Wii
- Release: JP: January 29, 2009; NA: March 24, 2009; EU: March 27, 2009; AU: April 2, 2009
- Genre: Action RPG
- Modes: Single-player, multiplayer

Final Fantasy Crystal Chronicles: Echoes of Time (Note: Japanese: ファイナルファンタジークリスタルクロニクル エコーズ・オブ・タイム, Hepburn: Fainaru Fantajī Kurisutaru Kuronikuru Ekōzu Obu Taimu) is a Wii and Nintendo DS action role-playing game in the Final Fantasy Crystal Chronicles series developed by Square Enix.

The game was released in Japan on January 29, 2009, in North America on March 24, in Europe on March 27, and in Australia on April 2.

== Gameplay ==
Echoes of Time is a hack and slash action role-playing game, that allows the players to create their own character by choosing one of the tribes: Clavats (swords), Yukes (magic), Selkies (jumping) and Lilties (spears). Each dungeon is filled with monsters that need to be defeated and puzzles to solve (pushing blocks, activating switches, etc...) in order to progress. Certain parts of the game consist of platforming in isometric view. All the non-player characters (some voice-acted) exist in two separate locations, one of them being reserved for guilds and shops. Their statements will change along with the plot progression. The real-time combat system requires the player to be close to the enemies rather than select items, which makes it different from the main entries of the Final Fantasy series. The players can visit towns to receive quests, recruit allies or to buy and craft armor or weapons. When a certain level is reached, a new ability will be unlocked. The weapons can also level up, and materials can be combined to create new ones. Besides physical attacks, there are seven spell types which can be combined and are represented by symbols on the screen: Blizzard, Cure, Clear, Fire, Rise and Thunder. Both the Nintendo DS and Wii versions can link up via Wireless, where four players can play together, online or offline.

== Synopsis ==
=== Setting and characters ===
Echoes of Time takes place on the same unnamed world as other entries in the Crystal Chronicles series, inhabited by four tribes; the Clavats, Lilties, Yukes and Selkies. It chronologically takes place during the "Golden Age" between the events of Crystal Chronicles: Ring of Fates and original Crystal Chronicles. Two thousand years prior to the game's events, a great civilization harnessed advanced technology using the power of Crystals, but a magical catastrophe in their future triggered the vanishing of crystals.

The game's lead is the player-created protagonist from one of the four races, raised in an isolated settlement called the Village, which is near a great crystal dubbed the Crystal Core. The protagonist is guided on their quest by the cat-like Clavat Sherlotta, who holds strange powers, must confront the Clavat scientist Larkeicus, and receives aid from the immortal Yuke Veriaulde.

=== Plot ===
The protagonist completes a coming-of-age ceremony, receiving a personal crystal shard from Sherlotta at the Crystal Core. Upon returning to the village, the protagonist learns one of the villagers has fallen ill with "crystal sickness". Setting out beyond the village, the protagonist learns that the crystals have been gone for two thousand years. In the nearest town, they strike a bargain with Larkeicus, who agrees to make a cure in exchange for the activation of two towers. When this task is complete, a larger tower appears. Larkeicus betrays the protagonist and uses the tower's weaponry to destroy the Crystal Core, causing everyone in the village to vanish. The protagonist works with Sherlotta and Veriaulde, a former ally of Larkeicus from 2000 years before, giving the protagonist the means of recovering the Crystal Core's fragments and restoring the village.

Larkeicus tries to stop the protagonist, reviving after their fight due to his experiments with immortality. He fails to absorb the protagonist's shard as it damages him, causing Larkeicus to identify them as the cause behind the future catastrophe and vowing to kill them. The protagonist receives flashbacks showing Sherlotta caring for him as a child, and that none of the villagers have aged since that time. Upon reforming the Crystal Core, it merges with the protagonist, allowing them to explore deeper into the local forest. Discovering a ruined version of the village, the protagonist learns that Larkeicus destroyed it 2000 years before; Sherlotta failed to escape, but the Crystal Core granted her immortality and a new dual form as her old self and the cat of a friend who died in the attack. She and the revived village lived in isolation and emptiness until the protagonist was found as a baby, giving them all purpose and reminding Sherlotta of her humanity. Sherlotta vows to stop Larkeicus from preventing the catastrophe he predicted, which led to the vanishing of crystals and downfall of his civilization.

The two infiltrate the tower, gathering artifacts to unlock the main door, during which time the Village inhabitants fade for good. At the tower's summit, the pair encounters Sherlotta's original body, now a comatose crystal producer that Sherlotta asks the protagonist to kill. Larkeicus appears, revealing he created the tower to reach the point in space where the catastrophe, a magical explosion which caused nearly all crystals to vanish, will take place. He incapacitates Sherlotta's current body and attacks the protagonist. Sherlotta eventually revives in her original body, creating a Crystal Core and revealing it is the same as the one in the Village; being forged from her own will, it harms Larkeicus and defies his technology. Sherlotta asks the protagonist to destroy the Crystal Core, which triggers the magical explosion predicted by Larkeicus. Larkeicus building the tower ensured the Crystal Core's creation and death of the crystals in his time, creating a stable time loop. The Crystal Core's released energy as it travels back in time destroys Larkeicus, Sherlotta and the tower. The protagonist makes a final visit to the Crystal Core's grove. They leave the crystal shard from the coming-of-age ceremony there, allowing it to grow into a new Crystal Core.

== Development ==
The CGI cutscenes were created by external company Shirogumi. The game was revealed to the public at the 2008 Tokyo Game Show. It uses a new engine created by Square Enix called the "Pollux Engine", which allows players to link up and adventure together in multiplayer mode regardless of which version of the game (Wii or Nintendo DS) they are playing. The Wii version of the game contains a new trailer for Final Fantasy Crystal Chronicles: The Crystal Bearers.

== Reception ==
Reception

Aggregate score
Aggregator	Score
Metacritic	DS: 75/100; WII: 64/100

Review scores
Publication	Score
Game Informer	7.75/10
IGN	DS: 8.5/10; WII: 6.5/10

In the first week of release, the DS version of Final Fantasy Crystal Chronicles: Echoes of Time sold 101,718 copies in Japan, while the Wii version sold only 21,721 copies. The following week, the DS version sold an additional 33,985 copies. By the end of the year, the DS version had sold nearly 260,000 copies in Japan, and the Wii version nearly 57,000 copies. The sales in its first week in North America were not as high, as approximately 25,000 were sold on the Wii and 16,000 on the DS. By May 2009, the game had sold 570,000 copies worldwide.

On Metacritic, Final Fantasy Crystal Chronicles: Echoes of Time has an aggregate score of 75/100 based on 37 reviews for the Nintendo DS version, and a score of 64/100 for the Wii version based on 29 reviews. Famitsu magazine gave the Wii version a 29 out of 40 and the Nintendo DS version a 30 out of 40. Reviews in the west were also positive. IGN gave Echoes of Time 8.5 out of 10 (but only 6.5 for the Wii version), commenting on the tighter controls and gameplay, particularly praising the multiplayer. Game Informer gave the game 7.75 out of 10.
