= Final Fantasy Crystal Chronicles: Ring of Fates =

2007 video game

- Developer: Square Enix
- Publisher: Square Enix
- Director: Mitsuru Kamiyama
- Producer: Kiyoko Maeda
- Designer: Hiroyuki Saegusa
- Programmer: Mitsuru Kamiyama
- Artist: Toshiyuki Itahana
- Writer: Hiroyuki Saegusa
- Composer: Kumi Tanioka
- Series: Final Fantasy (main); Crystal Chronicles (sub)
- Platform: Nintendo DS
- Release: JP: August 23, 2007; NA: March 11, 2008; AU: March 20, 2008; EU: March 21, 2008
- Genre: Action role-playing
- Modes: Single-player, multiplayer

Final Fantasy Crystal Chronicles: Ring of Fates (Note: Japanese: ファイナルファンタジー・クリスタルクロニクル リング・オブ・フェイト, Hepburn: Fainaru Fantajī Kurisutaru Kuronikuru Ringu Obu Feito) is an action role-playing game for the Nintendo DS, developed and published by Square Enix. It is a prequel to Final Fantasy Crystal Chronicles for the GameCube. The game takes advantage of both the local wireless and Wi-Fi capabilities of the system and features voice acting.

== Gameplay ==
A battle in Final Fantasy Crystal Chronicles: Ring of Fates.

Final Fantasy Crystal Chronicles: Ring of Fates is an action role-playing game; players take on the role of lead character Yuri in the single-player campaign, and a troop of adventurers in the co-op multiplayer mode dubbed "Multiplay". The player characters in both modes are selected from four playable races of the world; the balanced Clavats, tank-style Lilties, magic-focused Yukes, and ranged Selkies. Each character has specific weapon skills based around their race. The gameplay and general information is separated between the two screens of the Nintendo DS: the in-game display is shown on the top screen, while the lower touch screen displays the menu and weapon selection.

The player explores the 3D environments from an overhead third-person perspective, with levels consisting of interlinked rooms filled with enemies and sometimes a puzzle blocking progress until solved. Combat takes place in real-time within areas of a level. The player character attacks enemies in each zone, with combined inputs of the DS face buttons and d-pad resulting in faster combination attacks. Different combinations of button prompts create a variety of attacks. During combat, players can jump on enemies and land stronger attacks. When defeated, enemies drop items and equipment, which can be equipped, used in crafting, or sold for the in-game currency gil.

Over the course of the game, the player character raises their experience level, which improves general statistics and Ai behaviour in single-player. Their equipment can be upgraded and replaced with more powerful types during the progress of the game. Some equipment and accessories also grant passive benefits and bonuses while worn. Casting magic in the game requires Magicite, which is picked up from defeated chests and defeated enemies; only a certain number can be held at any one time due to inventory limits. Magic is cast by holding down a button command and aiming it, with other characters joining in to create enhanced or new spells.

The player character's movement and actions are controlled using the DS face buttons and d-pad. By holding the right trigger, the displays switch screens and time slows, and tapping an enemy on the touch screen activates the player character's special attack at the cost of SP. A special ability is tied to a player character's race, and play a part in both combat and puzzles. Puzzles range in scope and complexity, with some relying on activating switches and others being based around timed doorways or finding keys.

In multiplayer, up to four players can connect using local ad-hoc connection through Nintendo Wi-Fi. Players can create up to eight characters, selecting from any of the four races. There are two modes within multiplayer; Quest mode, which is tied to the mode's scenario, and Free Mode, which allows players to explore dungeons and towns at their leisure. While designed for multiple players, it can be completed by a single player. Completing a level unlocks others of higher difficulty, and once all levels are completed new harder variations of them are unlocked. While online, players in either campaign can send messages to each other via Moogle Mail. Collecting Moogle Stamps during exploration unlocks a version of "Blazin' Caravans", a minigame featured in the original game.

== Synopsis ==
=== Setting and characters ===
Ring of Fates takes place on the same world as the Final Fantasy Crystal Chronicles, which is inhabited by four races; the Clavats, Lilties, Yukes and Selkies. The story is set 8000 years prior to the events of Crystal Chronicles during a period dubbed the Golden Age, when the four races lived together in harmony. The world is guarded by the Great Crystal from the influence of the Red Crystal on the world's moon, which triggers the appearance of monsters and brings some people under its influence. The game is mostly set around the city of Rebena Te Ra, where the Great Crystal is housed.

The lead characters of the game are siblings Yuri and Chelinka, who lived a quiet life with their father Latov; their mother Aleria apparently died at some earlier time. They are blessed with their mother's crystal-based magical power, causing them to become involved in a wider conflict around the Great Crystal. They are helped by their neighbourhood friends, the Yuke scholar Alhanalem who is the twins' tutor, the Lilty alchemist Meeth Crym, and a Selkie wild boy called Gnash who has suffered through experiments related to the Great Crystal. They interact in Rebena Te Ra with the Selkie king Kolka Tawantyn and his Clavat-Selkie daughter Tilika. The main antagonists are Galdes, leader of the Red Crystal-allied Lunites and hierophant of the Crystal Temple holding the Great Crystal, and the maniacal Cu Chaspel.

=== Plot ===
The lives of Yuri and Chelinka, who live with Latov and Alhanalem are disrupted when they are attacked in Rebena Te Ra by Galdes's forces, then by Cu Chaspel when he tries to kidnap Chelinka. In the struggle, Latov is killed and the twins repel Chaspel with an uncontrolled burst of power. Chelinka is left mute, but able to speak telepathically with Yuri. After some time, Yuri has become a self-taught warrior, and set out with Chelinka on a quest to hunt down Lunites. During their journey, they reunite with Alhanalem and meet up with Kolka, running into an imposter posing as Alhanalem. In their efforts to unmask the imposter, the three run into and partner with Gnash and Crym at different points. During one part of their journey, Yuri makes use of his power to save them from a collapsing bridge, an act that almost kills him. Chelinka recovers from her muteness and revives him using her own powers.

Returning again to Rebena Te Ra, the group are framed by Cu Chaspel for the attempted murder of Kolka, and the party must escape their island prison through the planet's underworld. There they fight the possessed spirit of Latov as a being called the Lich, and learn about the ghost of Tilika who has been appearing to them at several points. Tilika died during an attempted summoning of the Red Crystal's "god" from the moon. Latov and Aleria saw this and went into hiding afterwards, with Aleria later being abducted as part of Galdes's experiments with the Great Crystal's magical energy. The party escape the underworld and return to Rebena Te Ra, unmasking the Alhanalem imposter as the true Lich who was controlling Kolka. The Lich is defeated and Tilika's spirit breaks her father's mind control. The party then goes to the captured Crystal Temple, defeating Cu Chaspel but being unable to stop Galdes from sacrificing the captured Aleria to the Red Crystal, turning Galdes into a god-like being capable of warping reality.

In Galdes's new reality, Yuri and Chelinka retain their memories, as they are together as twins across all possible realities, allowing them to awaken the memories of their companions and challenge Galdes again. The twins defeat Galdes, but he uses his power to undo the victory, then Chelinka uses her connection to the Great Crystal to empower Yuri with her greater ability to manipulate time. Using this power, Yuri traps Galdes in an eternal time loop across all timelines. He returns to living with the again-mute Chelinka, but his health fails and Chelinka sacrifices herself to revive him. The united wills of Yuri and Chelinka across all timelines rewrite history again, allowing the siblings to live with their still-living parents in peace.

The multiplayer storyline takes place after the single player campaign events, with the player helping restore and repopulate Rebena Te Ra in the altered timeline. During this time, they work with Kolka and free Tilika from the lingering presence of the Lich. Tilika and Kolka reconcile, and Tilika becomes the queen of Rebena Te Ra.

== Development ==
Ring of Fates was developed and published by Final Fantasy franchise developers Square Enix. The concept emerged following the release of the DS, with the production team feeling it was "perfect" for the Crystal Chronicles series, focusing on using the platform's capabilities to create a title that would be better than the original. Production of Ring of Fates began in the spring of 2006. Series creator Akitoshi Kawazu acted as executive producer and executive director for the game. Mitsuru Kamiyama, the main programmer for Crystal Chronicles, made his debut as game director, while also acting as lead programmer. The scenario was written by Hiroyuki Saegusa, who also acted as lead designer. The game was produced by Kiyoko Maeda. Production ran parallel with another Crystal Chronicles title, The Crystal Bearers for Wii. While The Crystal Bearers focused on a single-player experience, Ring of Fates continued the overall focus on multiplayer and party-based gameplay.

As with the original Crystal Chronicles for GameCube, the title both focused on multiplayer, and allow accessibility for both experienced and new players. When designing the campaigns, the team made the single-player narrative story-oriented, and the multiplayer narrative quest-oriented. In the single-player section, originally only one character was shown alongside the player character. As it was "more fun" for the protagonist to be fighting with friends, all present party members were included on screen, which needed an extensive and hurried restructure of the game programming. The game design drew from both internal and external feedback from the first game. Menu design for the touchscreen controls were tricky, as they needed to work within the potential fast pace of action gameplay. Kamiyama stated that he did not want to force players into using the stylus, so allowed them to instead use their thumbs by making the command icons a suitable size. The ability to paint the player's Moogle companion, a feature included hurriedly into the first game, was incorporated into Ring of Fates with touchscreen functions due to the original's positive reception. The multiplayer was limited to ad-hoc only as the developers wanted players to be close to each other, communicating about strategy while being able to freely move their character around each area. Online multiplayer was present in an early prototype, but the option was scrapped.

A single-player narrative was one of the earliest concepts for the game. When creating the scenario, the first idea was the protagonists facing a malicious crystal. Part of the production challenge was creating two separate scripts for the single-player and multiplayer storylines, a task made more difficult by including voice acting in the single-playing script. Full voice acting was impossible due to limited storage capacity, but key scenes were voiced. The story focused on themes of family and fraternal love, in addition to the recurring Final Fantasy motif of powerful crystals being included in a lesser capacity. In an effort to break away from series traditions, the wicked Red Crystal was introduced, and the ambiguous morality of the crystals overall was referenced. The game's subtitle referred to the concept of a wheel of fate, acting as a key plot point. The logo's red design, uncommon within the franchise, referenced the Red Crystal's influence.

The art director and lead character designer was Toshiyuki Itahana, who had worked in that capacity on the first Crystal Chronicles. His work on Ring of Fates ran parallel to his job as director for The Crystal Bearers. In addition, artist Yasuhisa Izumisawa designed a large number of weapons and armour sets for the characters. While he was unable to include much emotion or personality in his designs for the first Crystal Chronicles due to its gameplay style, Itahana was able to draw characters such as Yuri with far more expression and movement. His design for the antagonist Cu Chaspel, his favourite for the game, was inspired by a wooden mask brought back by a co-worker from holiday. The more cartoon-like style was partially born from the DS's hardware limitations, with the team creating large-headed chibi-style characters who could emote to players on the small screen. The 3D graphic design drew partial inspiration from the DS remake of Final Fantasy III. The cutscene design was approached in the same way as a home console release despite the portable platform. Creating the character models was a "constant struggle" with the hardware limitations and necessity for low resolution textures. The CGI opening was created by Image Corporation.

=== Music ===
The music was composed by Kumi Tanioka, who had worked as composer for the first Crystal Chronicles. As with her work on the original Crystal Chronicles, Tanioka used period instruments for the score. Production of the music began once the design and narrative were settled on, allowing Tanioka to read through the materials for inspiration and guidance. When composing the score, she kept in mind the narrative focus of the single-player campaign, together with its sombre tone. Writing the score took approximately a year. The score was created through much trial and error, with Tanioka becoming emotionally invested in the world and characters through her music.

The soundtrack was arranged by Tanioka and Yasuhiro Yamanaka. Tanioka attributed Yamanaka with helping get the variety of sounds they achieved on the DS's limited sound hardware. While sharing a musical style with the first game, Tanioka aimed to create a distinct musical identity. While she created a theme for the Great Crystal, she did not reuse the series's recurring crystal-themed music, instead writing an original piece that had the older music "hidden" within it. There were several times during production where she had to redo a piece because the production team wanted something different for a particular scene. One track arranged the original Final Fantasy victory theme composed by Nobuo Uematsu.

The game made use of a licensed theme song for the ending credits. The song, "Hoshi no Nai Sekai", (Note: "A World with No Stars" (星のない世界)) was written and performed by Japanese singer Aiko based on the themes and world of Ring of Fates. An official soundtrack album was released on September 17, 2007. The album featured a cover illustration by Itahana. A book of piano sheet music arrangements was published in January 2008. "Hoshi no Nai Sekai" was released as a single under the Pony Canyon label on August 22, 2007.

== Release ==
Ring of Fates was announced in May 2006 alongside The Crystal Bearers, touted as part of Square Enix's next wave of Final Fantasy titles for the upcoming console generation. It also formed part of the company's expansion into the multiplayer gaming scene following Final Fantasy XI. When announced, the game was 60% complete. The game was released in Japan on August 23, 2007. To commemorate the release, a themed Nintendo DS Lite console with accessories was produced by Square Enix and peripheral manufacturer Hori. A guidebook from Square Enix, Final Fantasy Crystal Chronicles: Ring of Fates Official Complete Guidebook, was released on September 20. A manga anthology was released on March 1, 2008, containing both serious stories related to the single-player campaign and more humorous narratives set during the multiplayer storyline. A novelization based on the single-player campaign, written by Osamu Kudo, was published by Enterbrain's Famitsu Bunko in two volumes on May 30 and July 30 the same year.

The localization was handled by Square Enix, who were faced with communicating the narrative and its more complex or mystical elements within a strict character limit. Alhanalem's dialogue was a challenge, as for a verbal tick the team had him saying a lot of words ending in "al", necessitating some rewriting of dialogue. A difficult set of characters were pet-themed NPCs in the multiplayer campaign, whose mannerisms in Japanese used animal vocalizations not easily localised into English. Voice recording was done by ZRO Limit Productions. The game launched in Western territories during March 2008; in North America on March 11, Australia on March 20, and in PAL territories on March 21. The game included a notable anti-piracy measure, with pirated copies randomly cutting to a black screen and a message thanking the player for trying the game.

== Reception ==
Reception

Aggregate score
Aggregator	Score
Metacritic	77/100

Review scores
Publication	Score
1Up.com	A
Edge	6/10
Eurogamer	7/10
Famitsu	35/40
Game Informer	6/10
GameSpot	7.5/10
GameSpy	4/5
IGN	8.2/10
NGamer	8.1/10 (Import); 8.4/10
Nintendo World Report	6/10
Official Nintendo Magazine	72%
PALGN	8/10

During its first week on sale in Japan, Ring of Fates sold 178,000 units, reaching second place in sales charts compiled by Media Create. By the end of the year, the game's various editions sold a combined total of over 374,000 units. As of August 2008, Ring of Fates had sold 690 thousand units worldwide, with 380,000 units sold in Japan, 160,000 in North America, and 150,000 in Europe. Two months later, total worldwide sales had reached 700,000 units.

Final Fantasy Crystal Chronicles: Ring of Fates received the scores of 9/8/9/9 (35/40) from Famitsu magazine. Nintendo Power gave the game a 7.0 out of 10, claiming it was "good, not great" and "Ring of Fates would be acceptable; for Final Fantasy, it is a major concern". It was a nominee for Best Story by IGN in their 2008 video game awards.
