= Final Fantasy Crystal Chronicles (video game) =

2003 video game

- North American GameCube cover art
- Developer: The Game Designers Studio (Note: The Game Designers Studio was a shell company led by Akitoshi Kawazu for Square (later Square Enix) Product Development Division 2. Remastered engine development by SoftGear.)
- Publishers: GameCube: JP: Square Enix; WW: Nintendo; Remastered; Square Enix
- Directors: Kazuhiko Aoki; Ryoma Araki (Remastered)
- Producers: Akitoshi Kawazu; Ryoma Araki (Remastered)
- Programmer: Mitsuru Kamiyama
- Artists: Toshiyuki Itahana; Rubi Asami (Remastered)
- Writer: Masahiro Kataoka
- Composers: Kumi Tanioka; Hidenori Iwasaki (Remastered)
- Series: Final Fantasy (main); Crystal Chronicles (sub)
- Platforms: GameCube; Nintendo Switch; PlayStation 4 Android iOS
- Release: GameCube: JP: August 8, 2003; NA: February 9, 2004; EU: March 12, 2004; AU: March 19, 2004; Remastered Edition; NS, PS4, Android, iOS: WW: August 27, 2020
- Genre: Action role-playing
- Modes: Single-player, multiplayer

Final Fantasy Crystal Chronicles (Note: Japanese: ファイナルファンタジー クリスタルクロニクル, Hepburn: Fainaru Fantajī Kurisutaru Kuronikuru) is an action role-playing video game developed by The Game Designers Studio for the GameCube. It was released in 2003 in Japan and 2004 in North America, Europe and Australia. A remastered version for Nintendo Switch, PlayStation 4, Android, and iOS was released in August 2020. A spin-off of the Final Fantasy series and beginning of the series of the same name, Crystal Chronicles was the first title in the franchise to be released for a Nintendo home console since Final Fantasy VI in 1994.

Players take on the role of adventurers who travel in a caravan gathering mystical fuel for crystals which protect the world's settlements from the destructive Miasma. The single-player campaign has the player escort the vessel carrying the crystal's energy, defending it from enemies and solving puzzles to progress. Multiplayer, which uses Game Boy Advance units connected using the console's link cable, has up to four players protecting the vessel.

Deciding to partner with Nintendo for game development following severe financial problems created by the failure of Final Fantasy: The Spirits Within, franchise creator Square formed the Game Designers Studio as a shell company to develop for Nintendo hardware without impacting games for Sony platforms. The development team wanted to create an accessible gameplay experience focusing on multiplayer. The music, written by Kumi Tanioka, made extensive use of medieval and Renaissance musical instruments.

Upon release, the title was positively received by journalists, and was nominated for multiple awards. Reaching high sales positions in Japan and the West, it went on to sell over one million copies worldwide. The remastered version saw generally mixed reviews, with many faulting the change to online-only multiplayer, and by-then dated gameplay mechanics. Subsequent entries in the Crystal Chronicles series have released for Nintendo consoles, beginning with Ring of Fates for the Nintendo DS.

== Gameplay ==
Four team members in battle

Final Fantasy Crystal Chronicles is an action role-playing game where players take control of a group of adventurers who travel the world searching for rare trees which produce "myrrh", used to fuel crystals protecting the world's settlements from the poisonous Miasma. Players are guided through a repeating series of events which dictate their progress through the game and its story. The adventurers set out from their village, travelling to the trees guarding the vessel which gathers the myrrh, exploring dungeons in which the trees reside, then returning home to renew their village's protective crystal.

Players choose their avatar character from one of four races; they can be male or female, each with four pre-set body types. Each race has specific strengths, such as the human-like Clavats having high defence and magic statistics and the nomadic Selkies being able to use special abilities with less cooldown time. Each character's attributes are further customised by choosing the profession of their family, which gives the character access to unique facilities and items each time they return to their home town. Players navigate the world map with their Caravan, and enter town and dungeon environments discovered during the journey. In towns, the player can freely explore and use the available facilities to create and upgrade both items and equipment using materials and blueprints gathered during their journey. The player can also encounter other caravans and travellers, triggering story events. Items used to support the player are both bought in shops and received as gifts from the player character's family.

While exploring dungeons, players are confined to a safe zone created by the vessel, fighting enemies in a style similar to hack and slash games with actions assigned to command buttons; actions can be chained together into short combination attacks using equipped weapons to increase damage and charge up magic abilities. Magic can be used to damage enemies or trigger status ailments, with multiple spells able to fuse and create new effects in battle. The elemental affinity of the player's attacks can be changed using crystals found in dungeons. Certain elemental affinities are necessary for crossing into new zones otherwise blocked by streams of Miasma. Instead of an experience point system, character attributes and statistics are increased by completing challenges in each dungeon session which award skill points, and Artifacts found in dungeons which can be equipped to a character.

In single-player, the player controls one character guarding the Moogle-held vessel from monster attacks while navigating dungeons. The game's multiplayer allows up to four players to join in a local gameplay session; multiplayer relies on the GameCube console linking with the Game Boy Advance (GBA) link cable. All players are displayed on the screen, while their GBAs both control their characters and allow functions such as shopping in towns and performing battle functions. Character attributes are increased in the same way, except that the necessary points are given to the best player during that session. In battle, players can raise attack meters using standard attacks in succession, and combine individual spells to create more powerful versions for higher damage. The link cable can also be used in single player, allowing the GBA to be used both as a controller and a second screen displaying radar information. The type of radar and what it shows is determined by the color the player's Moogle—one of a recurring Final Fantasy race—is painted during stays in towns and visits to the adventurers' hometown.

== Plot ==
Crystal Chronicles takes place in an unnamed fantasy world inhabited by four races. The player takes control of a caravan hailing from the village of Tipa, in which members of the world's four races come together to help its mission. One thousand years before the game's events, the world's sustaining Great Crystal was shattered by a meteorite carrying an alien lifeform called the Meteor Parasite. The Parasite generated a poisonous vapour called the Miasma, which kills anyone it touches. Fragments of the Great Crystal ward off the Miasma from surviving settlements, but require renewal using myrrh, an energy harvested from magical trees using magical vessels protected by dedicated caravans. The Tipa caravanners go on missions across the world to gather myrrh, learning the world's history from travellers and characters found in other settlements.

The caravanners eventually reach the home of the Carbuncles, an ancient race who guided the world's races to the Great Crystal fragments before going into hiding. After hearing of their adventures, the Carbuncles direct the caravanners to the source of the Miasma, asking them to destroy the Meteor Parasite. The caravanners fight the Meteor Parasite, but before they can kill it are transported to an unknown realm. There they meet Mio and her evil counterpart, Raem, metaphysical beings born following the Great Crystal's destruction. Raem attacks the caravanners, merging with Mio to increase his power, before finally being destroyed. Mio and Raem separate and fade away, then the caravanners are sent back to Mount Vellenge to destroy the wounded Meteor Parasite. The world is freed from the Miasma—allowing the four tribes to begin rebuilding civilisation—and the caravanners return home.

== Development ==
Crystal Chronicles was the first original Final Fantasy title to be developed for a Nintendo console since the release of Final Fantasy VI in 1994. Final Fantasy developer Square had broken with Nintendo in 1996 to develop Final Fantasy VII and future mainline entries in the series for Sony's PlayStation platforms, resulting in a long-standing enmity between Square and Nintendo. In 2001, following the financial failure of the feature film Final Fantasy: The Spirits Within, Sony purchased a stake in the company amounting to 19% of shares. After considering their still-poor financial situation and wishing to keep their staff from leaving, Square decided to begin developing titles for Nintendo consoles once again. Sony, whose rivalry with Nintendo had softened with the appearance of Microsoft's Xbox on the console market, agreed to the partnership on the condition that it would not impact development of titles for the PlayStation 2. This resulted in the creation of "The Game Designers Studio", a shell company for Square's Product Development Division 2 co-owned by Square and Akitoshi Kawazu, a staff member famous for his work on the SaGa series.

Development of the new project began in late 2001. The title was developed with the aid of Q Fund, a fund set up by Nintendo's Hiroshi Yamauchi to help first-time developers for the GameCube and GBA consoles. Kawazu acted as the game's producer. The director was Kazuhiko Aoki, a veteran of the Final Fantasy series who had worked on Final Fantasy IX. The artwork and character designs were created by Toshiyuki Itahana, who had also worked on IX. During the game's development in 2003, Square underwent a merger with Enix to become Square Enix, though the nature of the merger meant operations at the Gamer Designers Studio continued as normal. Square Localization Specialist Aziz Hinoshita stated that the game was originally meant to be an offshoot of Final Fantasy, and once the series was established it would drop the connection to that series and would be called "Crystal Chronicles". It was the only title ever developed by the company for the GameCube.

Similar to his SaGa games, Kawazu wanted to promote player freedom. The basic concept was to build a game around use of the link cable. Kawazu explained that using the GBA would "introduce different elements of gameplay". He later stated that this type of multiplayer meant "the entry was a bit high" for potential players. The battle system was initially going to use the series' recurring Active Time Battle system, but instead chose a purely action-based system to allow more people to enjoy the gameplay. Leveling based on experience points was also removed to create a level field for players. It was initially planned to include a human sidekick character, but upon considering its impact on multiplayer, they changed it to the current Moogle system.

The game's event planner was Masahiro Kataoka, a Square staff member who had previously worked in that capacity on Final Fantasy IX. The central plot details of the Miasma and role of Crystals were established early on, based around the wish to keep players together. Each race's defining traits were influenced by the designers' decisions about their combat options, with story-based additions coming from the planners later in production. The narrations which accompanied new areas were written in the style of journal entries, designed to both fit the theme of a caravan and introduce a new area to the player. While previous Final Fantasy games were driven by their narrative, Crystal Chronicles was driven by its gameplay; the narrative was instead communicated through basic storytelling and environmental narrative. Despite this shift, recurring elements from the Final Fantasy were included. The many encounters players had along the way were important to Kawazu, with the scenario designers "pushing themselves as far as they could" to fill the game world with these encounters and accompanying lore. Most of them were created well after production had begun.

Itahana heard about the project while he was attached to Final Fantasy XII during its early production, and transferred over to work on Crystal Chronicles. The scenario was already decided upon, with Itahana working from their briefs. A recurring theme in his artwork was the phrase "Memento mori". The four races were designed to have distinct silhouettes, so players would not get confused. Itahana originally created a cat-like race for the game, but Kawazu "hated" their design, so he created the plant-themed Lilties as a replacement. His work on the game lacked strong character designs due to the online multiplayer nature of the title. The player character designs were intended to be highly distinctive, allowing players to differentiate each other during play sessions. When creating the graphics, the team created graphical effects they considered possible only on the GameCube, and constantly checked background designs throughout development. Due to the multitude of elements new to Final Fantasy being incorporated into Crystal Chronicles, the development team faced multiple difficulties.

=== Music ===
The soundtrack to Crystal Chronicles was primarily composed by Kumi Tanioka, while music programmer and arranger Hidenori Iwasaki provided one additional piece of music. Prior to Crystal Chronicles, Tanioka had worked on the score of Final Fantasy XI. Beginning work on the score in 2002, Tanioka and Iwasaki decided to exclusively use period instruments. The soundtrack makes extensive use of many medieval and Renaissance musical instruments such as the recorder, the crumhorn and the lute, creating a distinctively rustic feel. Tanioka said that the idea came to her while looking at illustrations of the game world, which gave her the idea of making "world music", where the tracks would "not [be] limited to a single country or culture". She also credits Iwasaki with doing "fantastic technical work" that brought her vision to life. The live music was performed by the Roba Music Theater, whom Iwasaki and Tanioka had seen perform. In addition to performing, the musicians made suggestions about the use of instruments.

The game features two vocal themes; the opening theme "Kaze no Ne", (Note: (カゼノネ; "Sound of the Wind")) and the ending theme "Hoshizukiyo". (Note: (星月夜; "Moonless Starry Night")) Tanioka originally composed a longer version of "Kaze no Ne", but to keep the opening at a reasonable length she had to shorten it. The Japanese versions are sung by Yae Fujimoto, while the English versions are sung by Donna Burke. Burke also provided narration for the English version of the game. The lyrics for both "Kaze no Ne" and "Hoshizukiyo" were written by Kataoka. Describing her localization of the songs, Burke felt it was a challenge as Japanese is a more compact language than English, meaning she needed to "pad [the lyrics] out about 30-40%". Rather than a direct adaptation, Burke's work carried a similar message using altered words.

A soundtrack album was released under the Pony Canyon label on August 20, 2003. It included all of the music from the game with the exception of the English versions of "Kaze no Ne" and "Hoshizukiyo". Final Fantasy Crystal Chronicles: A Musical Journey was a European promotional album which was given alongside the game on March 11, 2004, as a pre-order bonus. It contains six tracks from the soundtrack, including "Kaze No Ne" in both Japanese and English, the only time the English version has been released. It was published by Nintendo of Europe. "Kaze no Ne" was released as a single by Pony Canyon, featuring "Kaze No Ne", an arranged version, and two other songs by Yae from her album Blue Line. The single was released on July 30, 2003.

== Release ==
The game was officially announced at the Jump Festa event in Japan in December 2002. A Western release was announced in April the following year. The game was among those shown by Square Enix at the 2003 Electronic Entertainment Expo, alongside a number of other titles including Final Fantasy XI and X-2, and other titles including Unlimited SaGa and Drakengard. Crystal Chronicles was released in Japan on August 8, 2003, after being delayed twice. The game came packaged with a GameCube-GBA link cable for use in multiplayer. In North America, the game was released on February 9, 2004, in Europe on March 12, and Australia on March 19. Square Enix published the game in Japan, while Nintendo handled all other territories including North America and Europe.

=== Remastered Edition ===
A remastered version, titled Final Fantasy Crystal Chronicles: Remastered Edition, was released in 2020. The remaster includes enhanced graphics, new and arranged music, thirteen new dungeons, voice acting, and cross-platform online multiplayer. The game was released for Nintendo Switch, PlayStation 4, Android, and iOS mobile platforms. The port's online engine environment, dubbed STRIX Engine, was licensed from Fantasy Earth Zero developer SoftGear. Originally scheduled for a release in January 2020, it was delayed past the original planned release so the development team could further polish the game. The game was released online worldwide on August 27. A physical cartridge for Nintendo Switch was released only in Japan. A free downloadable Lite Version, acting as a demo covering three dungeons, was released alongside the retail version. Players of the Lite Version can join multiplayer sessions with retail version owners, allowing them to experience all thirteen dungeons. The Lite Version was developed late in full production, when the majority of the remaster was in place.

Producer and director Ryoma Araki talked with senior staff about remastering older games after finishing work on another project. Araki had joined Square Enix originally after seeing Crystal Chronicles, and so when the chance came he expressed his wish to revive the game for a modern generation. While they had the option to remake it, Araki wanted to keep the game faithful to the memories of earlier players, both evoking nostalgia and assuring them that Crystal Chronicles was returning unchanged. Itahana returned, creating new lead character designs, but due to positive fan memories the original player designs were kept intact. Itahana worked on the new designs with Rubi Asami, who had previously worked on Mobius Final Fantasy.

Araki estimated that around half the game had been remade rather than remastered due to the number of changes and additions. When consulting Aoki and Kawazu, Araki was asked to keep the project faithful to its roots and update it for modern players. In addition to enhancing the graphics, the team improved the AI character behavior. Along with the new features, many of the changes were small adjustments done to increase its playability for a modern audience. One of these changes was the timing system for casting magic, which was adjusted to both work through an online connection and be more lenient on players than the original version. The mimic mechanic, which allows players to appear as characters met during the story, was implemented as a way for players to continue travelling with favorite characters without breaking the narrative flow. Unlike the original, the remaster does not support local multiplayer. During production, the team had to choose between local and online co-op rather than having both, so they opted for online to allow the maximum number of people to play. Commenting on the delays, Araki said the team were prioritising a smooth playing experience, but he ended up being "reprimanded by a lot of important people".

Composer Hidenori Iwasaki was brought in to both compose new tunes and arrange the original themes, though this was originally unplanned. The remaster was planned to use the original score, but the team's passion for the project prompted the decision to also remaster the music tracks. Remastering the old score was very easy as the original sound files had been kept in "perfect condition". While they worked on the game for a year, remastering the original score took only three months. New themes were composed by Tanioka, who had become a freelance composer and performer in 2010. In order to recall her feelings to create new tracks, Tanioka listened to the original soundtrack. While the new themes were mainly for the additional dungeons, other tracks were incorporated into the rest of the game. The new boss battle theme, while more energetic and modern-sounding than the original score, was written in the same style as Tanioka's earlier work. Fujimoto and Burke both returned to record new versions of the opening and ending themes. Burke enjoyed redoing the English theme, as she had gained more depth and experience since the original release.

== Reception ==
Reception

Aggregate score
Aggregator	Score
Metacritic	80/100

Review scores
Publication	Score
1Up.com	B+
Electronic Gaming Monthly	8/8/8
Eurogamer	9/10
Famitsu	32/40
Game Informer	7/10
GameSpot	8/10
IGN	7.5/10

Japanese gaming magazine Famitsu praised the game's fairytale aesthetic and unconventional treatment of the RPG genre; journalists Shane Bettenhausen, Jennifer Tsao and Kevin Gifford Electronic Gaming Monthly each gave the game high praise for its innovation in gameplay and graphical style. Eurogamer's Rob Fahey gave the game a near-perfect score, noting the clear production values and calling it "one of the best action RPGs" he played; his only major fault was the implementation of multiplayer and its potential problems.

Andrew Reiner—writing for Game Informer—was highly critical of the overall experience, calling the game "an experiment gone awry [...] unfit to bear the sacrosanct Final Fantasy name". A second opinion given by Adam Biessener supported this view, with Biessener feeling that the game did little to distinguish itself from other similar titles. GameSpot's Brad Shoemaker enjoyed the game despite faulting its high hardware demands for the full experience, and his publication later named it the best GameCube game of February 2004. Mary Jane Irwin of IGN also gave praise to its gameplay concepts and design, but noted a lack of replay value and the steep entry requirements for multiplayer. 1Up.com praised the Gauntlet-like gameplay while criticizing FFCC's item-management system that made juggling items a chore.

Reviewers praised the game's art design and music, but most considered the story lacking compared to other Final Fantasy games. The gameplay was lauded for its implementation of multiplayer despite the hardware requirements and its detrimental effect on the single player campaign. A consensus in both Japanese and international reviews was that it was an innovative title, but with several flaws keeping it from being ranked among the best Final Fantasy games.

Remastered Edition saw generally "mixed or average" reviews on both Switch and PS4. Jordan Rudek of Nintendo World Report felt that the single-player campaign lacked compelling content, and the multiplayer was hampered by the new additions to the point of making it worse than the original. IGN's Seth Macy was very negative, feeling that the game only made the original frustrating mechanics worse and added new problems. Mitch Vogel, writing for Nintendo Life, felt that the game would not appeal to a wide demographic and the new multiplayer functions sapped much of the original version's entertainment. Bryan Vitale of RPG Site felt it was still "serviceable" as an RPG, but showed its age and lacked polish on top of the frustrating online multiplayer functions. Kirstin Swalley of Hardcore Gamer was notably more positive, noting the age of its graphics design but otherwise finding it a fun and enjoyable Final Fantasy title. Reviews generally praised the art and music, but many faulted its archaic gameplay and unfriendly online multiplayer design.

=== Sales ===
During its debut in Japan, Crystal Chronicles sold over 179,500 units, reaching second place in sales charts. During the next two weeks, it first dropped to third place then rose to second place again. By 2004, Crystal Chronicles had sold nearly 355,000 units, becoming the twenty-eighth best-selling game title of the year in Japan and boosting GameCube sales for August. Following its North American release, the game was the best-selling title of the month. In the United Kingdom, the game was the best-selling GameCube title of its week of release, a position it retained during the second week. As of October 2007, the game has shipped over 1.3 million copies worldwide.

The Nintendo Switch version sold 48,957 physical copies during its first week on sale in Japan, making it the third bestselling retail game of the week in the country.

=== Awards and retrospectives ===
Crystal Chronicles received the Grand Prize at the 2003 Japan Media Arts Festival, based on its multiplayer function and graphical achievements. During the 2004 National Academy of Video Game Trade Reviewers ceremony, the game was nominated for awards in the "Character Design", "Costume Design", "Game - Sequel RPG" and "Original Musical Score" categories. It was later nominated for the "Console Role-Playing Game of the Year" award at the 8th Annual Interactive Achievement Awards.

IGN ranked the game in 2003 prior to its Western release as second in a list of the best co-op video games; while noting that the game's unusual features and chosen platform caused confusion within the Final Fantasy fan base, its multiplayer promised a high quality experience if other elements could live up to it. Eurogamer's Rob Haines praised the game's approach to the inherent conflict between multiplayer gameplay and narrative, and despite its drawbacks called its multiplayer function "the most fully-featured implementation of Gamecube-Game Boy Advance connectivity ever created". Henry Gilbert of GamesRadar, as part of a 2017 article ranking the best Final Fantasy spin-off games, praised the game's multiplayer elements and return to Nintendo consoles despite its extensive hardware demands.

== Legacy ==
Crystal Chronicles was the only original game developed by the Game Designers Studio, which had become a subsidiary of Square Enix following the 2003 merger. The Game Designers Studio was eventually renamed SQEX Corporation in 2005. It was later merged with Taito in 2006 following Taito's acquisition by Square Enix, and eventually dissolved entirely during consolidation of Square Enix's arcade businesses in 2010.

Multiple Crystal Chronicles titles were later developed for Nintendo's later consoles, with Square Enix's aim being to make full use of Nintendo hardware while developing the Final Fantasy franchise. The first was Final Fantasy Crystal Chronicles: Ring of Fates for the Nintendo DS (DS). Two further titles were Echoes of Time for the DS and Wii, and The Crystal Bearers for the Wii. Square Enix also developed two Crystal Chronicles titles for the Wii's WiiWare service; My Life as a King and its direct sequel My Life as a Darklord. All the Crystal Chronicles games share the same continuity, creating a narrative spanning several millennia.

Kataoka would go on to work on the scenarios of multiple titles following Crystal Chronicles including Final Fantasy X and XII. He eventually left the company and founded Studio Reel in 2012. Studio Reel and Kataoka would work together with Kawazu on the development of the 2015 title SaGa: Scarlet Grace.
