= Yae Fujimoto =

Japanese singer

Yae
- Born: December 14, 1975 (age 50)
- Origin: Tokyo, Japan
- Genres: World Music
- Occupations: Singer, songwriter
- Years active: 1999–present
- Label: Pony Canyon

Yae Fujimoto (藤本 八恵, Fujimoto Yae; born December 14, 1975)

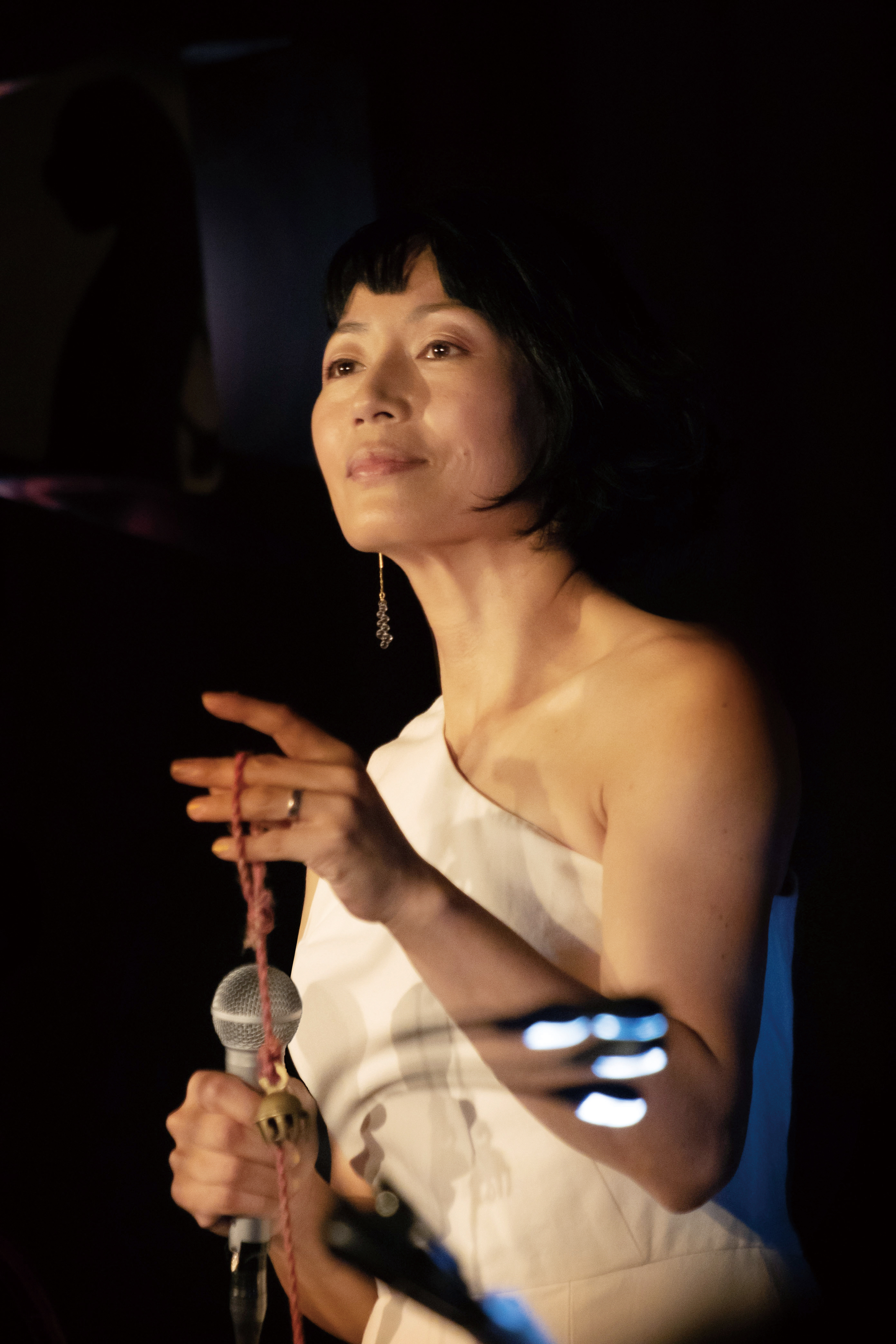

, known as Yae, is a Japanese singer, mainly known outside Japan for having performed the theme songs for the GameCube role-playing video game Final Fantasy Crystal Chronicles.

== Biography ==
Yae is the second daughter of the singer and musician Tokiko Kato (加藤 登紀子, Katō Tokiko) and the activist Toshio Fujimoto (藤本 敏夫, Fujimoto Toshio).

She studied modern dance during high school, and decided to become a singer in 1999. She started singing in restaurants and bars, by which time she had formed a band and expanded her musical style. In June 2000, she debuted with the album "new Aeon".

In March 2018, as a member of the activist team "MOTHER EARTH", she was appointed as an ambassador for the Ministry of the Environment's "Let's connect and support Mori Satokawa Sea project".

== Discography ==
=== Albums ===
- 2000 new Aeon
- 2003 Blue Line
- 2004 Yae -flowing to the sky-
- 2004 aloha nui
- 2006 Yae: Live

=== Singles and extended plays ===
- 2000 Kaze No Michi
- 2003 Na mo naki Kimi he
- 2003 Kaze No Ne and Hoshizukiyo (Final Fantasy Crystal Chronicles, opening and ending theme songs)
- 2005 Koi no Sanbusaku(恋の三部作)
- 2010 あいをよる おもいをつむぐ

=== Other appearances ===
- 2001 Blasa, The Legend of Condor Hero (神鵰俠侶 コンドルヒーロー; ending theme song)
- 2004 Shinsei (新生) and Michi (歌), Nitaboh, the Shamisen Master (NITABOH 仁太坊-津軽三味線始祖外聞; theme songs)
