= Final Fantasy Crystal Chronicles: The Crystal Bearers =

2009 video game

- Developer: Square Enix
- Publisher: Square Enix
- Director: Toshiyuki Itahana
- Producer: Akitoshi Kawazu
- Artist: Toshiyuki Itahana
- Writers: Akitoshi Kawazu; Kazuhiro Yamauchi
- Composers: Hidenori Iwasaki; Ryo Yamazaki; Kumi Tanioka
- Series: Final Fantasy (main); Crystal Chronicles (sub)
- Platform: Wii
- Release: JP: November 12, 2009; NA: December 26, 2009; PAL: February 5, 2010
- Genre: Action-adventure
- Modes: Single-player, multiplayer

Final Fantasy Crystal Chronicles: The Crystal Bearers (Note: Japanese: ファイナルファンタジー・クリスタルクロニクル クリスタルベアラー, Hepburn: Fainaru Fantajī Kurisutaru Kuronikuru: Kurisutaru Bearā) is an action-adventure game developed by Square Enix and released for Wii. It was released on November 12, 2009 in Japan and on December 26 in North America. The game received a mixed reception.

== Gameplay ==
Like its GameCube predecessor, Crystal Bearers features fully real-time combat, but unlike its predecessor, focuses on free-roaming action-adventure for a single player. Players can use airships. Enemies have a wide variety of tactics and abilities, and some have the ability to hurt fellow creatures and oppose the player. This is part of the AI reaction, in which different creatures react in unique ways to other ones nearby and to the attacks. The player controls Layle. He can use psychokinetic gravity powers to perform different combat actions, such as moving certain enemies against their will, making them use their abilities against other enemies and utilizing various objects as projectiles. He can perform some type of reaction elements with creatures, affecting them in different manners. Layle can utilize abilities to interact with the environment, such as activating switches, or grabbing ledges and other objects from a distance via an energy-based grappling hook. He can also perform such actions as moving civilians against their will. Civilians share traits with enemies in that they can attack the player, when irritated by actions. Unlike role playing games, the action adventure one has the player customizing Layle's status, using accessories with materials and other items. The player can increment the character's maximum HP by clearing miasma stream fights and collecting the myrrh from each areas. Exploration and free-roaming are heavily focused on the game to the point that there are fifteen bosses are needed to progress through the story and the rest are scattered everywhere for the player to find. Traveling can either be done by foot, riding chocobos, taking the train or using warp portals. The game also features a combat for sky diving. The player can take Quicktime events, making actions during certain events, such as aiming the remote and shooting monsters in the sky.

== Synopsis ==
=== Setting and characters ===
The game takes place in the same world as Final Fantasy Crystal Chronicles, inhabited by four races; the peaceful Clavats, militaristic Lilties, magic-wielding Yukes and rebellious Selkies. Each race being represented by a magical crystal. The story is set 1000 years after the events of Crystal Chronicles. During the intervening years, a war between the Lilties and Yukes ended when the Yuke Crystal was destroyed, exiling the Yukes to non-existence and establishing a technologically advanced kingdom. Their technology is based around crystal reactors, which generate power using fragments of the Yuke Crystal. Magic has become rare, used by those with crystal shards embedded in their bodies, dubbed "crystal bearers". Their powers, which have been in the past used for evil, cause crystal bearers to become both respected and feared.

The main protagonist is Layle, a Clavat crystal bearer with gravity-manipulating abilities. On his journey, he accompanies the Selkie Belle, a member of the Selkie guild; the Selkie Keiss, an ambitious man determined to play a role in the Lilty Kingdom; and Althea, princess of the Lilty Kingdom. An important supporting character is the Lilty engineer Cid, creator of the crystal reactors and a version of the recurring Final Fantasy character. The main adversaries are the Lilty general Jegran, a supremacist who ruthlessly maintains the status quo; and Amidatelion, a surviving Yuke determined to restore the Yuke Crystal by any means.

=== Plot ===
While escorting a cruise ship to the Lilty capital, Layle confronts Amidatelion as they launch an attack. Amidatelion uses their Crystal Idol to absorb energy from the ship. With the help of his friends, Layle pursues Amidatelion as they drain Lilty technology to empower their Crystal Idol, which can restore the Yuke Crystal. Jegran, determined to maintain his power over Althea and the Lilty kingdom, kills Selkie guild leader Vaigali and frames Layle for the crime, branding him as Amidatelion's ally. Layle goes on the run, reluctantly partnering with Amidatelion to survive Jegran's forces. He learns that the Yukes cursed the Lilty Crystal before vanishing, and despite the risk of activating the curse Amidatelion seeks to restore the Yukes and re-establish the Crystal Principle, a metaphysical force that created the world's crystal bearers. After catching up with them, Jegran reveals himself to be a crystal bearer. He kills Amidatelion, but Layle manages to save the Crystal Idol.

Althea captures Jegran, wanting to force him into restore her father whom he turned into crystal to power the Lilty capital's crystal reactor. Jegran instead drains the crystal of power, intent on founding a new principle, and identifies Althea as a crystal bearer. Layle, having decided to complete Amidatelion's quest and supported by his allies, saves Althea and defeats Jegran as the Yuke crystal is restored. As Jegran and Layle apparently die in battle, Althea and the restored Yukes use their magic to halt the curse on the Lilty Crystal. In the aftermath, the Crystal Principle is restored, and all crystal reactors and still-living crystal bearers lose their magic. Althea becomes queen and makes peace with the Yukes, while Keiss takes Vaigali's place as leader of the Selkie guild. Belle, convinced that Layle is alive, steals Keiss's ship to follow a lead. As the game ends, Layle is shown alive and still able to use his powers.

== Development ==
When the Wii was first showcased, Square Enix developer Akitoshi Kawazu's first thought was that he wanted to make a single player version of Final Fantasy Crystal Chronicles. As a result, Crystal Bearers was designed to be a "single-player experience", as opposed to the GameCube installment which focused on cooperative play. Early concepts ranged from allowing players to fish, to using the Wiimote to move objects around in space. Kawazu also wanted to make a game that gave players a sense of the passage of time, which he called a "real time" Final Fantasy. This idea led to the thought about how in the real world, swinging a sword takes time, as opposed to the traditional button pushing that is instantaneous and more artificial. Kawazu also wanted to minimize the number of menus, since the Wii was usually in a family room in peoples houses and distracted from the fun. Kawazu stated that the game should have the feeling of being at a theme park, with gamers not distracted and wholly focused on the experience. Kawazu describes the games genre as "Attraction Adventure", with players going from different entertainment experiences freely. There was also a minimum amount of game terminology compared to most Final Fantasy games to help casual players feel welcome.

While previous Crystal Chronicles titles had a strong multiplayer element, The Crystal Bearers was designed from the outset as a single-player game. The decision was motivated by a wish to have players experience and be immersed in the journey of a single character. To promote a sense of united fun for both players and onlookers, in addition to trying something new for the series, the team abandoned RPG elements in favour of making the game an action-adventure. To make sure the game was pleasing to Japanese audiences, an introductory sequence that taught players the controls was included. Originally the game development team did not intend to use any of the unique features of the Nintendo Wii, but by the end they changed their minds. The team also realized that the Wii had become very popular with casual users, and retargeted the game at them. Internet connectivity was not added due to the low percentage of Wii owners using the feature. The team behind The Crystal Bearers was the same that developed the original Crystal Chronicles games except for the programmers, the head of which had previously worked on the Front Mission series. During on site play testing, players familiar with Final Fantasy but not action games were able to learn "smoothly". Indeed, Kawazu advised the design team near the end of development to not focus on "punishing" the player so much, as games traditionally do by having the protagonist die and restart. The producer expressed his desire to for every player to see the games ending, whether they are skilled at the game or not. Incorporating Wii MotionPlus was considered, but Itahana abandoned the idea as he felt the controls were designed to be "intuitive" without the need for high sensitivity movement.

The main protagonist Layle was designed to be relatable and personable so he could carry both the action-adventure gameplay and the wider narrative. The complete lack of weapons for Layle was so younger players could easily play the game, as he would not come off as visually violent compared to other Final Fantasy characters. The graphical style of the game was intended to be more mature to match the concept of a single concept. Toshiyuki Itahana stated he wants a more "world weary" protagonist, and wanted him to seem rugged, which influenced the hair design of the character. The game features a more "mature" design to help bolster the heroic structure of the story. Kawazu notes that the game should be enjoyable for even people just watching the game being played, and included shot changes every few seconds, a news ticker-type information feed on the bottom. He also noted that the protagonist had to look attractive in case the mothers of younger players saw them playing the game. One of the design changes that were initially opposed by the design team was the changing of character heights from "three heads high" to six. Game artist Itahana wanted to make "an exhilarating tale of this great hero set against sweeping blue skies", which influenced many decisions in game design and story. As a compromise to the Lilties's more traditional body types, a variety of types were included ranging from more traditional stocky builds to more humanoid characters like Althea. The costumes were designed to depart from the series' standard Western fantasy theme, with rugged outfits meant to exemplify adventure. Itahana took several trips to local hardware stores for inspiration. The early American aesthetic dominating the game was inspired by many on the team liking early Hoolywood western films.

=== Music ===
The music of The Crystal Bearers was composed Hidenori Iwasaki and Ryo Yamazaki, with series composer Kumi Tanioka only making a small contribution due to her commitments composing the soundtracks for both My Life as a Darklord and Echoes of Time. Iwasaki and Yamazaki originally wanted to emulate Tanioka's style with their work on The Crystal Bearers, but Kawazu and Itahana persuaded them to change into an acoustic style inspired by American music. The music was intended to be different from traditional Final Fantasy, and was designed to be more "popular" and modern, and included country and western music. This approach, like the clothing and world design, was inspired by early Hollywood films.

== Release ==
The game's existence was announced at E3 2005 and at E3 2006 a short pre-rendered teaser trailer was included within a Wii games compilation video. In May 2007 a new trailer including gameplay was released and a few interviews with the developers were given. Since then, no game information was given. Crystal Bearers has had no presence at recent Square Enix events or the website (the Crystal Chronicles developer blog has not made mention of Crystal Bearers since June 6, 2007) coupled with the developers of My Life as a King refusing to comment when asked about the status of The Crystal Bearers at the Game Developers Conference of February 2008, stating only that the public should "wait for a press release". In November, in response to a section in the next month's issue of Electronic Gaming Monthly stating that the game had been "quietly canceled" Square Enix released a statement confirming that the game had not been canceled and that they fully intend to release it, although no release date could be given. Itahana was surprised at the cancellation rumors, as he was in fact considering how to best reveal the game to fans. A trailer for the game was packaged with the Wii version of Echoes of Time. It shows the game in a further state of development, and displays game characteristics such as combat, magic, puzzle solving and an overworld, as well as traditional elements of the Final Fantasy series, such as the Cactuar and Bahamut. At the end of March, an official teaser site opened up. In Japan, a commercial for the game aired with the song We Weren't Born to Follow by Bon Jovi playing in the background.

== Reception ==
Reception

Aggregate score
Aggregator	Score
Metacritic	66/100

Review scores
Publication	Score
1Up.com	C−
Famitsu	30/40
G4	2/5
Game Informer	5.5/10
GameSpot	5.5/10
GameTrailers	7.7/10
IGN	6.2/10
Nintendo Power	8/10

On its first day of release in Japan, The Crystal Bearers sold 26,000 units, which is about 34% of its initial shipment in the region. The Japanese version sold 43,705 units by its second week of release, and over 54,000 copies by the end of the year.

The game was praised by Weekly Famitsu, saying the game's plot elements were well done; one reviewer wrote: "The way the story develops, along with the unique characters and world setting, is brilliant. There are lots of little details to everything". However, the publication criticized the game's map, finding it difficult to pinpoint the player's location with respect to the surroundings. The game received mixed and generally less favorable reviews from western outlets. X-Play gave a negative review, while Game Informer and IGN faulted the game for being an action adventure rather than an RPG. 1Up.com criticized the game's seemingly endless amount of fetch quests and terrible combat" In contrast, GameTrailers and Nintendo Power reviewed the game more positively.
