= Hatchet Job of the Year =

British journalism award

Hatchet Job of the Year was a British journalism award given annually from 2012 to 2014 to "the writer of the angriest, funniest, most trenchant book review of the past twelve months". It was awarded by The Omnivore, a review aggregator website, with the aim to "raise the profile of professional critics and to promote integrity and wit in literary journalism". The prize was a year's supply of potted shrimp.

== Awards ==
=== 2012 ===
Winner:

- Adam Mars-Jones on By Nightfall by Michael Cunningham (The Observer)

Shortlist:

- Mary Beard on Rome by Robert Hughes (The Guardian)
- Geoff Dyer on The Sense of an Ending by Julian Barnes (The New York Times)
- Camilla Long on With the Kisses of His Mouth by Monique Roffey (The Sunday Times)
- Lachlan Mackinnon on Clavics by Geoffrey Hill (The Independent)
- Leo Robson on Martin Amis: The Biography by Richard Bradford (New Statesman)
- Jenni Russell on Honey Money by Catherine Hakim (The Sunday Times)
- David Sexton on The Bees by Carol Ann Duffy (London Evening Standard)

Judges:

- Suzi Feay, Rachel Johnson, Sam Leith, D.J. Taylor

=== 2013 ===
Winner:

- Camilla Long on Aftermath: On Marriage and Separation by Rachel Cusk, (The Sunday Times)

Shortlist:

- Craig Brown on The Odd Couple by Richard Bradford, (The Mail on Sunday)
- Ron Charles on Lionel Asbo by Martin Amis, (The Washington Post)
- Richard J. Evans on Hitler: A Short Biography by A.N. Wilson, (New Statesman)
- Claire Harman on Silver: A Return to Treasure Island by Andrew Motion, (London Evening Standard)
- Zoë Heller on Joseph Anton by Salman Rushdie, (New York Review of Books)
- Allan Massie on The Divine Comedy by Craig Raine, (The Scotsman)
- Suzanne Moore on Vagina: A New Biography by Naomi Wolf, (The Guardian)

Judges:

- Lynn Barber, John Walsh and Francis Wheen

=== 2014 ===
Winner:

- A. A. Gill on Autobiography by Morrissey, (The Sunday Times)

Shortlist:

- Craig Brown on Distant Intimacy: A Friendship in the Age of the Internet by Frederic Raphael and Joseph Epstein, (The Mail on Sunday)
- Rachel Cooke on Strictly Ann: The Autobiography by Ann Widdecombe, (The Observer)
- Lucy Ellmann on Worst. Person. Ever. by Douglas Coupland, (The Guardian)
- Peter Kemp on The Goldfinch by Donna Tartt, (The Sunday Times)
- Frederic Raphael on A Delicate Truth by John le Carré, (The Times Literary Supplement)
- David Sexton on The Luminaries by Eleanor Catton, (London Evening Standard)
- Hedley Twiddle on The Last Train to Zona Verde by Paul Theroux, (New Statesman)

Judges:

- Brian Sewell, John Sutherland and Rosie Boycott

== Press coverage ==
The award has been covered by the BBC, The Guardian, Huffington Post, The Daily Telegraph, Los Angeles Times, New Statesman, The Paris Review, Salon.com, The Scotsman, Time, The Washington Post, and The Week.
