= Aftermath: On Marriage and Separation =

2012 divorce memoir

- First edition (publ. Faber & Faber)
- Author: Rachel Cusk
- Genre: Memoir
- Publication date: 2012

Aftermath: On Marriage and Separation is a 2012 divorce memoir by Rachel Cusk dealing with her marriage and divorce from her husband Adrian Clarke. It follows two earlier memoirs, one related to their children: A Life's Work: On Becoming a Mother.

== Summary ==
Cusk explores her first marriage, separation and divorce.

== Reception ==
The book was reviewed by various newspapers, including the Telegraph and The New York Times.

Camilla Long's review in The Sunday Times was scathing. Long's review won the Hatchet Job of the Year award in 2013.
