= Lucky One =

Lucky One(s) or The Lucky One(s) may refer to:

== Film ==
- D' Lucky Ones, a 2006 Philippine film
- The Lucky Ones (film), a 2008 American film
- The Lucky One (film), a 2012 American film

== Literature ==
- The Lucky Ones (short story collection), a 2003 short-story collection by Rachel Cusk
- The Lucky One (novel), a 2008 novel by Nicholas Sparks
- The Lucky Ones (memoir), a 2024 memoir by Zara Chowdhary

== Music ==
=== Albums ===
- Lucky Ones (album), by Pat Green, 2004
- The Lucky Ones (Mudhoney album), 2008
- The Lucky Ones (Pentatonix album), 2021
- The Lucky Ones (Pride Tiger album), 2007
- The Lucky Ones (Willie P. Bennett album), 1985

=== Songs ===
- "Lucky One" (Amy Grant song), 1994
- "Lucky One" (Exo song), 2016
- "The Lucky One" (Alison Krauss song), 2001
- "The Lucky One" (Faith Hill song), 2006
- "The Lucky One" (Laura Branigan song), 1984
- "The Lucky One" (Uku Suviste song), 2021
- "The Lucky Ones" (song), by Kerli, 2012
- "Lucky One", by Goo Goo Dolls from Boxes, 2016
- "Lucky One", by Tom Morello from The Atlas Underground, 2018
- "The Lucky One", by Blue October from Home, 2016
- "The Lucky One", by Celldweller from Wish Upon a Blackstar: Chapter 03, 2010
- "The Lucky One", by Taylor Swift from Red, 2012 and Red (Taylor's Version), 2021
- "Lucky Ones", by Kevin Drew from Spirit If..., 2007
- "Lucky Ones", by Lana Del Rey from Born to Die, 2012
- "Lucky Ones", by Lights from Little Machines, 2014
- "Lucky Ones", by Loverboy from Get Lucky, 1981

== Other ==
- LuckyOne Mall, a shopping mall in Karachi, Pakistan, and an associated residential development
