= Joan Brady (American-British writer) =

American-British writer (1939–2024)

- Born: 4 December 1939; San Francisco, California, U.S.
- Died: 13 June 2024 (aged 84)
- Citizenship: United States (birthplace), United Kingdom^{[explain status]}
- Occupation: Writer
- Spouse: Dexter Masters (m. 1963; died 1989)
- Children: Alexander Masters
- Parents: Robert A. Brady (father); Mildred Edie Brady (mother)
- Relatives: Judy Brady Syfers (sister)
- Writing career
- Language: English
- Period: 1979–2024
- Genres: Biography, suspense fiction
- Notable work: Theory of War
- Website: joanbrady.co.uk

Joan Brady (4 December 1939 – 13 June 2024) was an American-British writer. She was the first woman and American to win the Whitbread Book of the Year Award for her novel Theory of War.

== Biography ==
=== Personal life ===
Born Joan Brady on 4 December 1939, in San Francisco to Mildred Edie Brady and Robert A. Brady. She had one sister, Judy. Before becoming an author, she was a dancer with the San Francisco Ballet and the New York City Ballet then went on to study philosophy at Columbia University in New York City. In 1963, she married author Dexter Masters, her mother's former secret lover. In 1965 they moved to England, and together had a son, Alexander Masters, who authored Stuart: A Life Backwards. Her husband died in 1989, and towards the end of her life she lived in Oxford, England.

Brady died from a heart attack brought on by sepsis, on 13 June 2024, at the age of 84.

=== Works ===
Her first published book was The Impostor in 1979. In 1982, she published her autobiography, that appears under both the titles The Unmaking of a Dancer and Prologue: An Unconventional Life.

Her third book and second novel, Theory of War, was hailed as a "modern work of genius" and earned the Whitbread Novel of the Year award, as well as the Whitbread Book of the Year award. This book also won the French Prix du Meilleur Livre Étranger and a US National Endowment for the Arts grant. Two novels followed, Death Comes for Peter Pan, an exposé of medical abuse in America, and The Emigre, the adventures of a conman.

Bleedout was her first thriller. She started writing crime fiction during a legal battle over fumes from a nearby shoemaker from which she won a large settlement. Bleedout takes place against a backdrop of political and corporate corruption and follows two men, one a murderer, another his mentor in the process of being murdered as the action progresses. Its sequel Venom, published in 2010, introduces the theme of pharmaceutical ruthlessness in pursuit of a cure for radiation poisoning.

== Bibliography ==
- The Impostor (1979)
- The Unmaking of a Dancer (1982) aka Prologue: An Unconventional Life (in UK)
- Theory of War (1993)
- Death Comes For Peter Pan (1995)
- The Emigré (1999)
- Bleedout (2005)
- Venom (2010)
- The Blue Death (2012)
- America’s Dreyfus: The Case Nixon Rigged (2015)
