= Corner 103 =

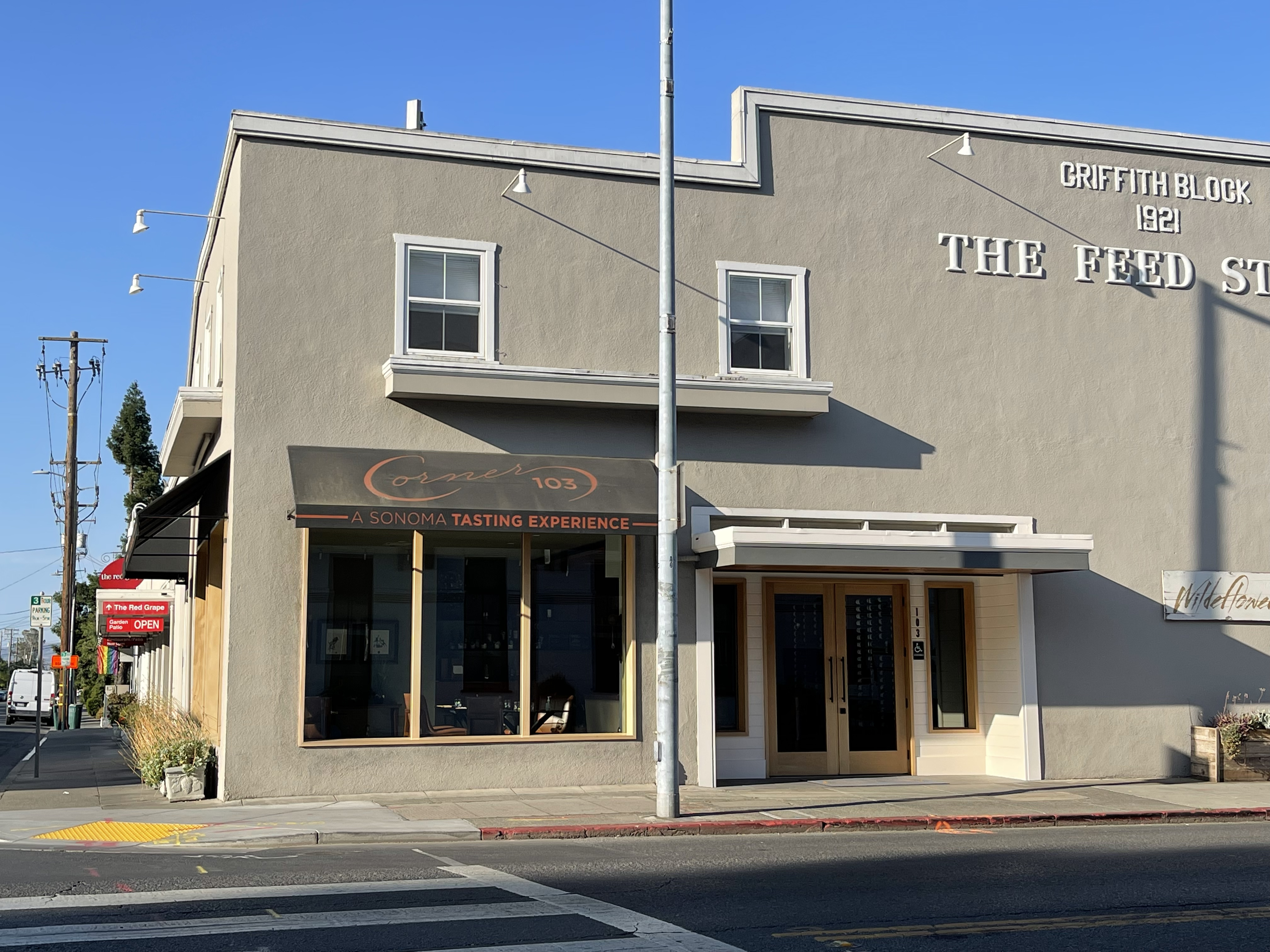
- Location: 103 W. Napa St., Sonoma, California, United States
- Coordinates: 38°17′31.08″N 122°27′32.99″W
- Wine region: California
- First vintage: 2012
- Opened to the public: 2015
- Key people: Lloyd Davis
- Varietals: Pinot Noir, Chardonnay, Semillon, Syrah, Sauvignon Blanc, Zinfandel, Merlot, Cabernet Sauvignon, Petit Verdot
- Distribution: limited
- Tasting: open to the public
- Website: corner103.com

Corner 103 is a winery in Sonoma, California in the United States. The winery is named after the tasting room location, which is located on the corner of a historic building in downtown Sonoma.

== History ==
Corner 103 is owned by Lloyd Davis. Before working in the wine industry, he worked in banking and finance in New York City for 30 years. Davis is a former owner of Viansa Winery, in which he co-purchased in 2008. He sold Viansa and decided to start his own winery.

== Wine ==
Wines are made from a variety of Sonoma County American Viticultural Areas including: Carneros AVA, Sonoma Coast AVA, Russian River AVA, Alexander Valley AVA, Dry Creek Valley AVA, Rockpile AVA and the Sonoma Valley AVA. They make a rosé sparkling wine using pinot noir, semillon, chardonnay and syrah grapes.

== Tasting room ==
Corner 103's tasting room is located in downtown Sonoma, California. It is located in the historic Feed Store building. The tasting room is open to the public. Davis pairs seasonal food with the wines in order to provide guests an educational experience. Staff lead guests through seven food and wine pairings which include charcuterie, local cheese, rillette and other gourmet foods paired with Corner 103 wine. The wines served during the tasting represent a different AVA in Sonoma County. Staff share information on the soil and growing conditions of each vineyard from which the wines come from and also discuss the correct type of glass the wines should be served in and the temperature the wines should be served at.

== Gallery ==
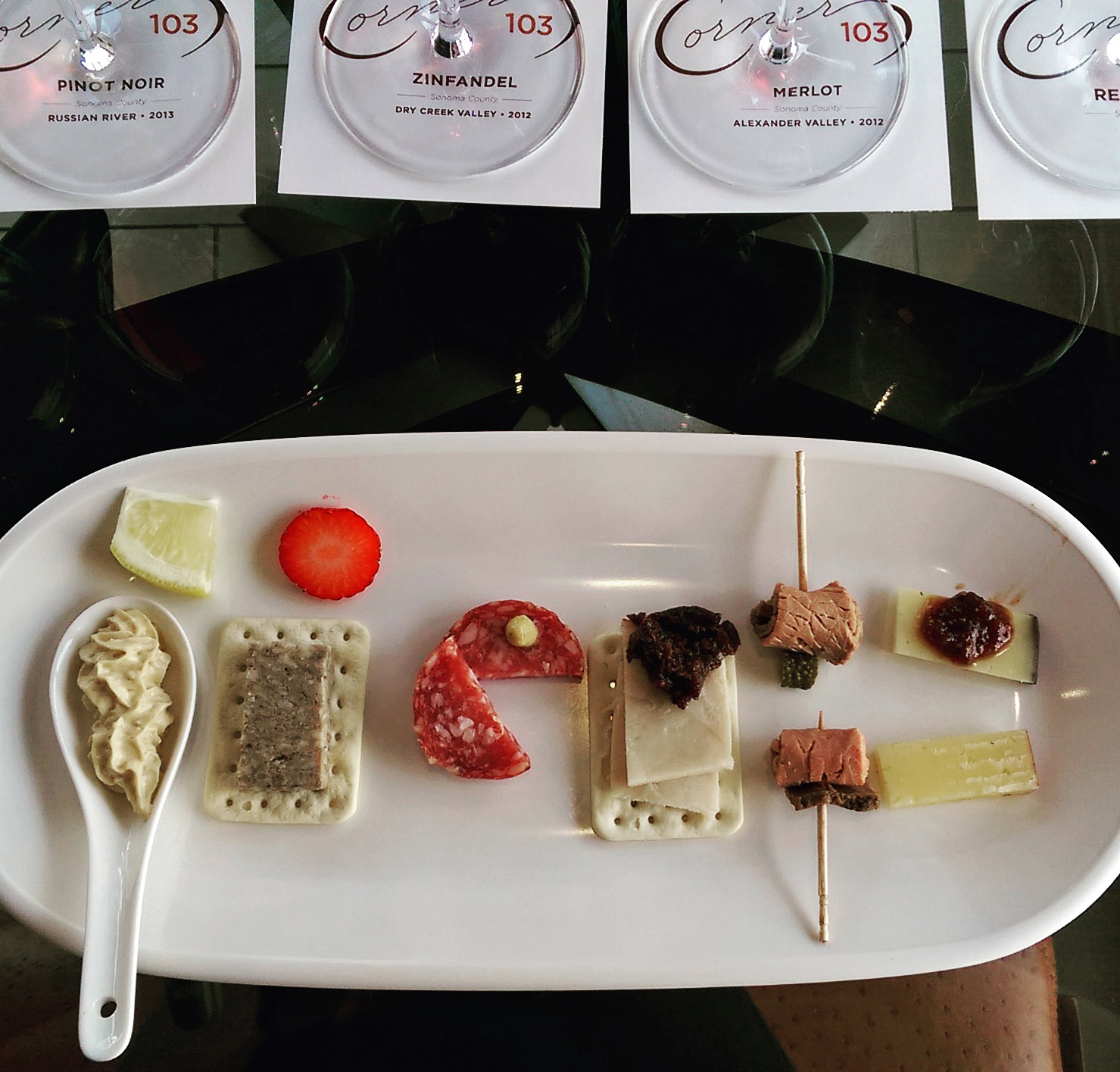
Food pairing at Corner 103

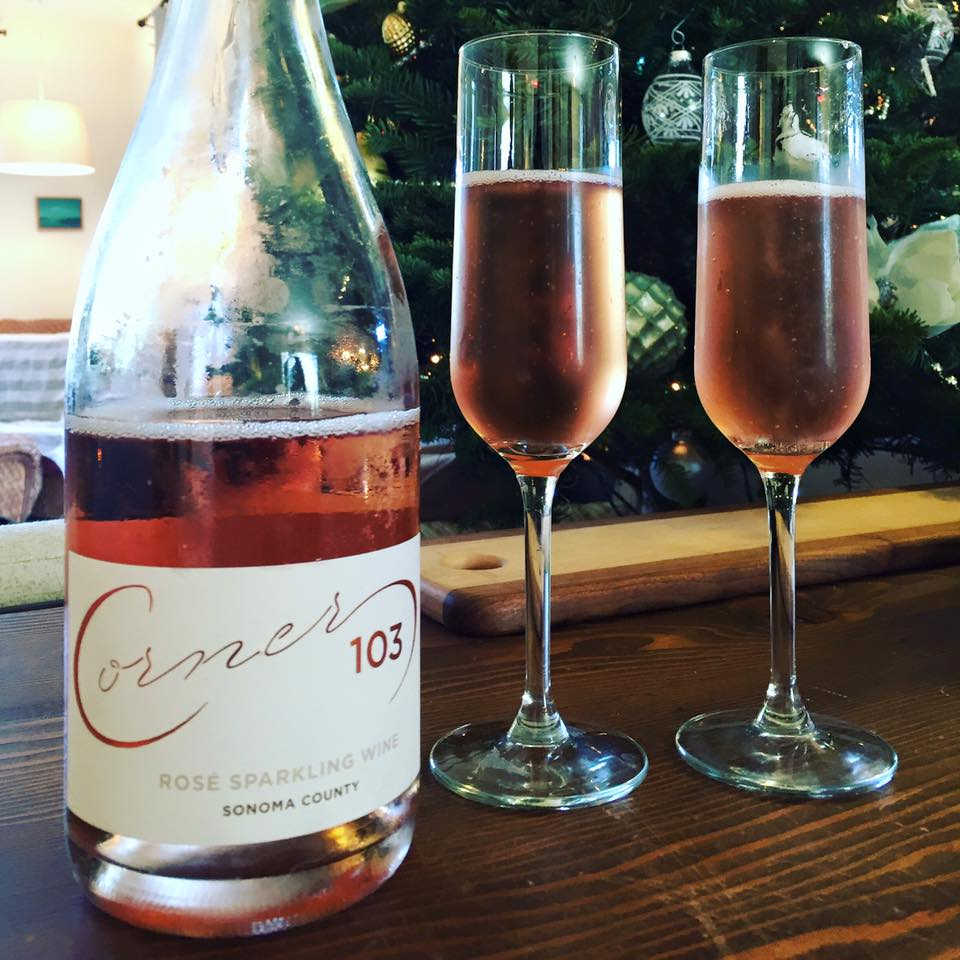
Sparkling wine
