= Arlington Park (disambiguation) =

Arlington Park was a race track in Arlington Heights, Illinois.

Arlington Park may also refer to:

- Arlington Park station, a Metra station near Arlington Park
- Arlington Park (novel), a 2006 novel by Rachel Cusk
- Arlington Business Park, a Goodman business park in Reading, England
- Arlington Memorial Park, a cemetery in Hudson County, New Jersey

== See also ==
- Arlington Park Northwest Dallas
