= Camilla Long =

British journalist

- Born: Camilla Elizabeth Long; 18 June 1978 (age 48); Winchester, England
- Education: Corpus Christi College, Oxford
- Occupations: Journalist, writer
- Children: 2

Camilla Elizabeth Long (born 18 June 1978) is a British newspaper columnist with The Times and The Sunday Times. She is associate editor of the News Review section of The Sunday Times and a columnist for Style magazine.

== Early life ==
Camilla Long was born to Richard Pelham Long and Roslyn Vera Britton, a daughter of Captain Gordon Britton RN, both academics.

She was educated at Oxford High School and Corpus Christi College, Oxford.

== Career ==
Long joined Vogue as an administrator and became a writer. She was a journalist at The Tatler from 2002. She moved to The Sunday Times in 2007, working on Style magazine and working with A.A. Gill, Lynn Barber, and John Witherow. In 2012 she wrote that Dave Lee Travis groped her when she interviewed him; she was in court when he was sentenced for groping another woman in 2014 and said he reacted angrily to her presence. In July 2013, Long succeeded Cosmo Landesman as film critic for The Sunday Times. She was also a TV critic for the newspaper until February 2026, when she moved to be the restaurant critic.

In 2008 Long was found to have plagiarised an article from Radar magazine in the US. Long wrote "50 reasons why you're still single" in the Sunday Times Style magazine. Over 15 of the entries were found to be substantially similar to those of another list, "100 reasons why you're still single", published in Radar the previous September.

=== Reactions ===
Writer Monique Roffey referred to being "hatcheted" by Long in 2011. In January 2012, Long interviewed the actor Michael Fassbender. Her opening question referred to the large size of the actor's penis ("That's kind of you to say", he replied). A section of Long's article was read to Fassbender in a subsequent interview for GQ magazine, including Long's statement that she was "quite certain that [Fassbender] would willingly show me his penis, given slightly different circumstances and a bucket of champagne," prompting Fassbender to respond that "I don't think I would touch her with a barge pole!"

In March 2015, Long received criticism for referring to Thanet as "a small nodule of erupted spleen at the eastern edge of England." In April 2015 Long appeared on the BBC's Have I Got News for You and was asked to justify such defamatory comments about South Thanet, the constituency where Nigel Farage, then UKIP leader, was standing for election. UKIP registered a complaint with Kent Police but no further action was taken.

She was suspended from Twitter in July 2020 for referring to "facemask Nazis". Piers Morgan has said she is "mischievous, provocative, and occasionally merciless". Emma Lee-Potter, who interviewed Long for the 2017 book Interviewing for Journalists, called her "brilliant" and noted the "Camilla Long rule" of always taking the first interview slot offered. Dominic Sandbrook said she is "one of the funniest writers you could hope to read".

=== Awards ===
Long was awarded the 2010 and 2016 British Press Awards "Interviewer of the Year (broadsheet)" prize. In 2023, she was awarded columnist of the year, and was shortlisted in 2025.

In 2013, she won the Hatchet Job of the Year award for a piece on Rachel Cusk's divorce memoir Aftermath: On Marriage and Separation published in March 2012; Long had also been nominated the previous year.

== Personal life ==
As of 2023, Long lived in north-west London with her photojournalist husband and their two children.
