= City Life =

City Life may refer to:

- Urban culture, the culture of cities
- CityLife (Milan), a 2004 urban project in Milan
- City Life (The Blackbyrds album), 1975
- City Life (Boogie Boys album), 1985
- City Life (magazine), a Manchester-based listings magazine
- City Life (music), a 1994 musical composition by Steve Reich
- City Life (TV series), a New Zealand soap opera
- City Life (video game), a 2006 city building video game developed by Monte Cristo

== See also ==
- Country Life (disambiguation)
