= Outline (novel) =

Novel by Rachel Cusk

- First edition (UK)
- Author: Rachel Cusk
- Language: English
- Genre: Fiction
- Publisher: Faber and Faber (UK), Farrar, Straus and Giroux (US)
- Publication date: 2014 (United Kingdom), 2015 (United States)
- Pages: 256
- ISBN: 978-0-374-22834-7
- LC Class: PR6053.U825 O68 2015
- Followed by: Transit

Outline is a novel by Rachel Cusk, the first in a trilogy known as The Outline trilogy, which also contains the novels Transit and Kudos. It was chosen by The New York Times critics as one of the 15 remarkable books by women that are "shaping the way we read and write fiction in the 21st century." The New Yorker has called the novel "autobiographical fiction."

== Plot ==
An English writer flies to Athens to teach a summer writing workshop. On the plane, she meets an older Greek divorcé who tells her about his two failed marriages. The next day she meets with an Irish colleague from the writing school who also tells her his life story. In every chapter, the writer meets people and engages in long conversations on topics such as love, fiction, marriage, and intimacy.

== Reception ==
Outline was named one of The New York Times Top Ten books of 2015. It made the 2014 shortlist of the Goldsmiths Prize, the 2015 shortlist of the Folio Prize, and the 2015 shortlist of the Bailey Women's Prize for Fiction.

Outline was voted the 34th best book since 2000 by The Guardian. In 2024, the New York Times named it the 14th best book of the 21st century.
