= Rillettes =

Spreadable meat paste

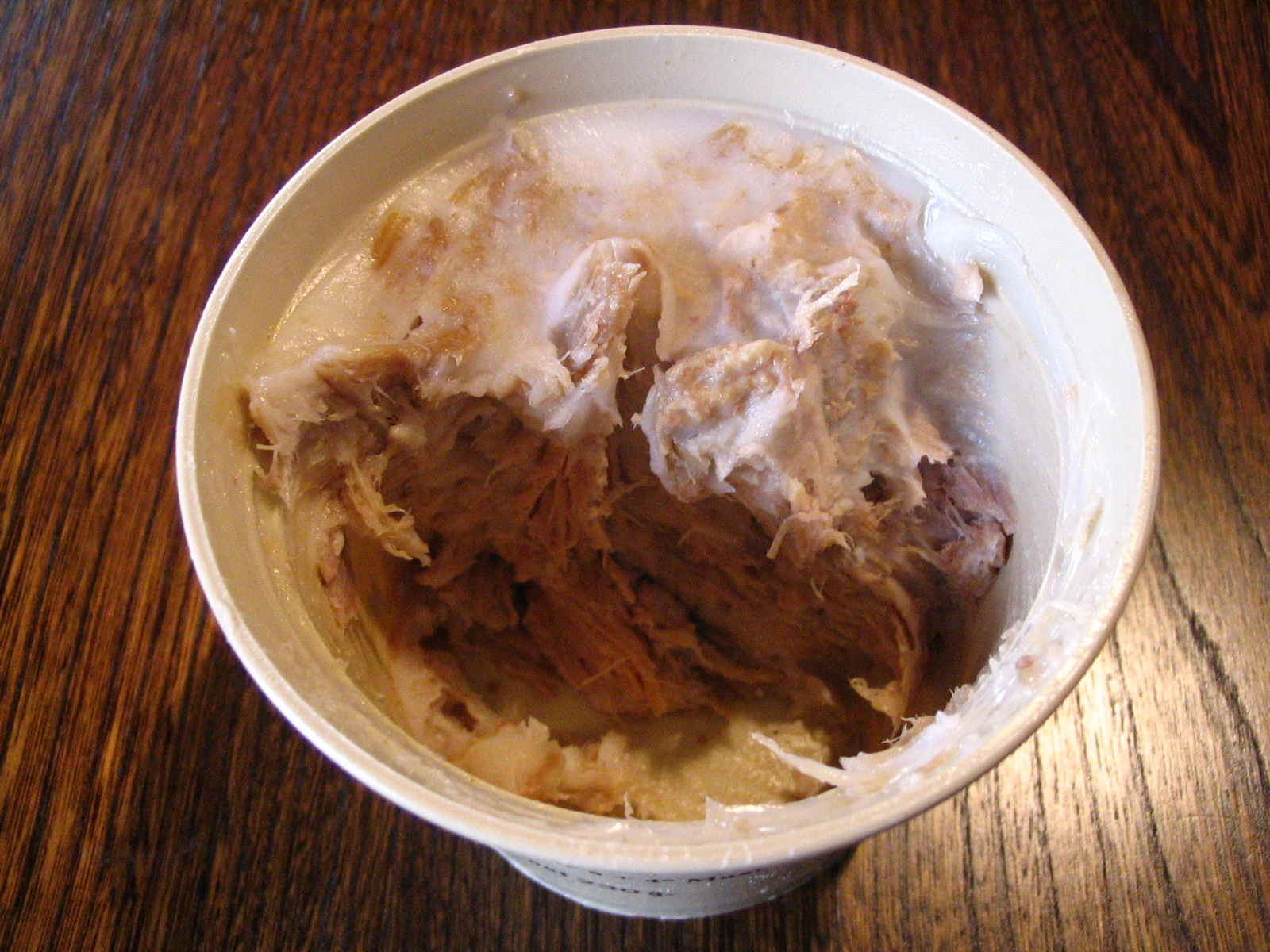
- Rillettes du Mans
- Type: Spread
- Place of origin: France
- Main ingredients: Meat (pork, goose, duck, chicken, game birds, rabbit), salt, fat

Rillettes (/rɪˈlɛts, riˈjɛt/, also UK: /ˈriːjɛt/, French: [ʁijɛt]) is a French charcuterie specialty of spreadable meat paste made by cooking meat in fat.

Like confit, the meat is seasoned, submerged in its own rendered fat, and cooked slowly for four to ten hours. The meat is shredded and packed into sterile containers covered in fat. Rillettes is traditionally made with pork, but the technique is also applied to duck, goose and other meats such as chicken, game birds, and rabbit. Sarthe (Le Mans), Tours, and Anjou, all in central France, are notable sources of rillettes.

Rillettes are typically served at room temperature spread thickly on toasted bread.

Rillettes were traditionally made with fatty pork belly or pork shoulder. The meat was cubed, salted and cured, cooked slowly over low heat until very tender, then raked into small shreds and blended with the warm cooking fat to form a rustic paste. Rillettes could be stored in crocks for several months. In Anjou, rillaud was a speciality, plated in the shape of a pyramid and topped with the pig's tail; the rillettes were proudly displayed to the guest of honor. In time the rillette cooking style was applied to game birds and wild rabbit. The similar British potted shrimps are made with shrimp cooked in butter.

The dish has many variations. In general, rillettes are served at room temperature, as a spread for bread or toast much like terrine. Pork rillettes from the northwestern regions of Tours and Anjou are known for their texture and bronze color. Rillettes from the adjacent département of Sarthe have a more rustic texture, including larger pieces of pork and less color.

Balzac called rillettes "brown jam" (brune confiture). It is sometimes said that Rabelais called them "brown pork jam" (brune confiture de cochon), but neither the word rillettes nor that phrase appear in his writings.

In Quebec, cretons are similar to rillettes.

== Fish rillettes ==
By analogy, spreads made of cooked or smoked fish combined with butter, cream cheese, mayonnaise and so on have been called rillettes since the 1970s. True rillettes recipes, where the food is cooked in fat for many hours, are not suitable for fish, so recipes for fish rillettes have "nothing in common with rillettes proper, but ... have a somewhat similar appearance", and are sometimes called "false" rillettes.

Fish rillettes generally consist of fish mashed into a creamy base. Smoked salmon, mackerel, trout, tuna, eel, and bluefish are commonly used.

== Etymology ==
The French word rillettes is first attested in 1845. It derives from the Old French rille 'a slice of pork', attested in 1480. This is a dialect variation of the Old French reille 'lath or strip of wood', from the Latin regula.

== See also ==
- List of cooking techniques
- List of spreads
- Meat floss
- Pemmican
- Potted meat
