= Mildred Edie Brady =

American journalist

Mildred Edie Brady (June 3, 1906 – July 27, 1965) was a freelance writer for The New Republic who is mostly known for writing the May 26, 1947 article The Strange Case of Wilhelm Reich (with the subhead, "The man who blames both neuroses and cancer on unsatisfactory sexual activities has been repudiated by only one scientific journal") about psychiatrist Wilhelm Reich's controversial "cosmic energy" research.

== Writings on Reich ==
Wilhelm Reich had quit lecturing on medical psychology at the New School for Social Research, after having been invited to teach there in 1939. Brady was curious about his orgone accumulator and its purported ability to concentrate orgone energy. In 1947 Brady approached Reich for an interview at his home in Forest Hills, Queens. She intended to gain evidence to portray Reich as a conductor of a confidence trick, but did not get any special information from her visit. Shortly thereafter Brady wrote two articles arguing that Reich was engaged in dangerous behavior. In her first article, she wrote that he engaged in a Bohemian lifestyle. In her second article, she attributed to Reich the claim that orgone accumulators increase orgastic potency.

Brady wrote: "Orgone, named after the sexual orgasm, is, according to Reich, a cosmic energy. It is, in fact, the cosmic energy. Reich has not only discovered it; he has seen it, demonstrated it and named a town—Orgonon, Maine—after it. Here he builds accumulators of it, which are rented out to patients, who presumably derive 'orgastic potency' from it."

Brady argued that the "growing Reich cult" had to be dealt with. Reich came to believe that Brady was a Stalinist acting under orders from the Communist Party, a "communist sniper," as Reich called her.

The article's reception contributed to a downturn of Reich's reputation which ultimately led to his conviction and imprisonment.

== Personal life ==
She was married to Robert A. Brady, with whom she had two daughters, Judy Brady (1937–2017) and Joan Brady (1939–2024).

After the beginning of World War II Brady and her husband worked for the Office of Price Administration. Brady and her husband were with Consumers Union at its founding and she later worked as editorial director and senior reporter of Consumer Reports. She dated Dexter Masters. She died of a heart attack.

== See also ==
- The Strange Case of Wilhelm Reich (2013 film)
