= Judy Brady Syfers =

American feminist and writer

- Born: Judith Ellen Brady; April 26, 1937; San Francisco, California, U.S.
- Died: May 14, 2017 (aged 80); San Francisco, California, U.S.
- Education: University of Iowa
- Known for: "I Want a Wife"

Judith Ellen Brady Syfers (April 26, 1937 – May 14, 2017) was an American feminist and writer. She was involved in consciousness raising and wrote the essay "I Want a Wife" which was published in the first edition of Ms. magazine. She later became an activist focusing on the political and environmental factors leading to breast cancer.

== Early life ==
Brady Syfers was born Judith Ellen Brady in San Francisco, California, on April 26, 1937. Her parents were Mildred Edie and Robert Alexander Brady and her sister was Joan Brady and she grew up in Berkeley, California. She graduated from Anna Head School in 1955, before attending the Cooper Union in New York City. She received a B.F.A. in painting from the University of Iowa in 1962, where she met her future husband, James Syfers. She considered pursuing a masters but the selection committee advised her not to continue her studies as she was unlikely to be hired by a university. The couple moved to San Francisco in 1963 and had two daughters: Tanya and Maia.

== Activism ==
Brady Syfers was a full-time housewife while her husband was working at San Francisco State University, when the couple became involved in a strike to support the push to create a department for ethnic studies. She allowed their home to become the fundraising headquarters, where she organized and fed the striking students and faculty. The strike lasted five months and after it ended, the university's Black Student Union organized a meeting to thank their supporters, where her husband was specifically mentioned but Brady Syfers was left out. She decided to contribute to the women's movement and joined the consciousness raising group at the Glide Memorial Church and the Women's Liberation Movement.

In 1970, she wrote "Why I Want a Wife" as a rally speech as part of the Women's Strike for Equality on August 26, 1970, in San Francisco to celebrate the fiftieth anniversary of women's suffrage. The speech was reported on by television, radio and newspaper reports. Brady Syfers wrote of her desire to have someone else provide a wage, child care, house-cleaning, meals and sex. It satirized the role of the wife, who fulfilled a myriad of useful positions for her husband without proper appreciation, and is used as an example of satire and humor in the women's movement. The speech was first published in Tooth and Nail, an underground newspaper, and then re-purposed in Motherlode, the magazine where Brady Syfers worked. It appeared in the preview of Ms. magazine published in New York magazine's 1971 year-end issue, where it was one of the best-known articles, and in the first full issue of the magazine published in 1972. The article was later re-published in books and textbooks through the years, including the 1971 anthology Notes from the Third Year edited by Anne Koedt and Shulamith Firestone.

She was a member of Breakaway, a women's community school, and taught a class on the women's movement. Between 1970 and 1972, she was one of the seven national coordinators for the Women's National Abortion Action Coalition. She travelled to Cuba in 1973 with the Venceremos Brigade, a country she later returned to, and she travelled to Nicaragua to witness the revolution. She and her husband divorced and she began working as a secretary.

Brady Syfers developed breast cancer while in her forties and she became focused on the political and environmental factors that led to cancer. She published the book 1 in 3: Women with Cancer Confront An Epidemic in 1991 with Cleis Press, which tied the cause of cancer to industrial capitalism rather than individual factors. She published a regular column titled "Cashing in on Cancer" in the Women's Cancer Resource Center newsletter. She was a co-founder of Greenaction for Health and Environmental Justice and a member of Breast Cancer Action, the Charlotte Maxwell Complementary Clinic, the National Coalition for Health and Environmental Justice and the Toxic Links Coalition. She was a regular public speaker and writer and she appeared in the 2011 film, Pink Ribbons, Inc.

== Later life ==
She purchased a Victorian house in the Mission District with her two friends in the 1980s, where she became involved with the local community and the fight against gentrification. Brady Syfers died on May 14, 2017, in San Francisco.
