= Robert A. Brady =

American economist (1901–1963)

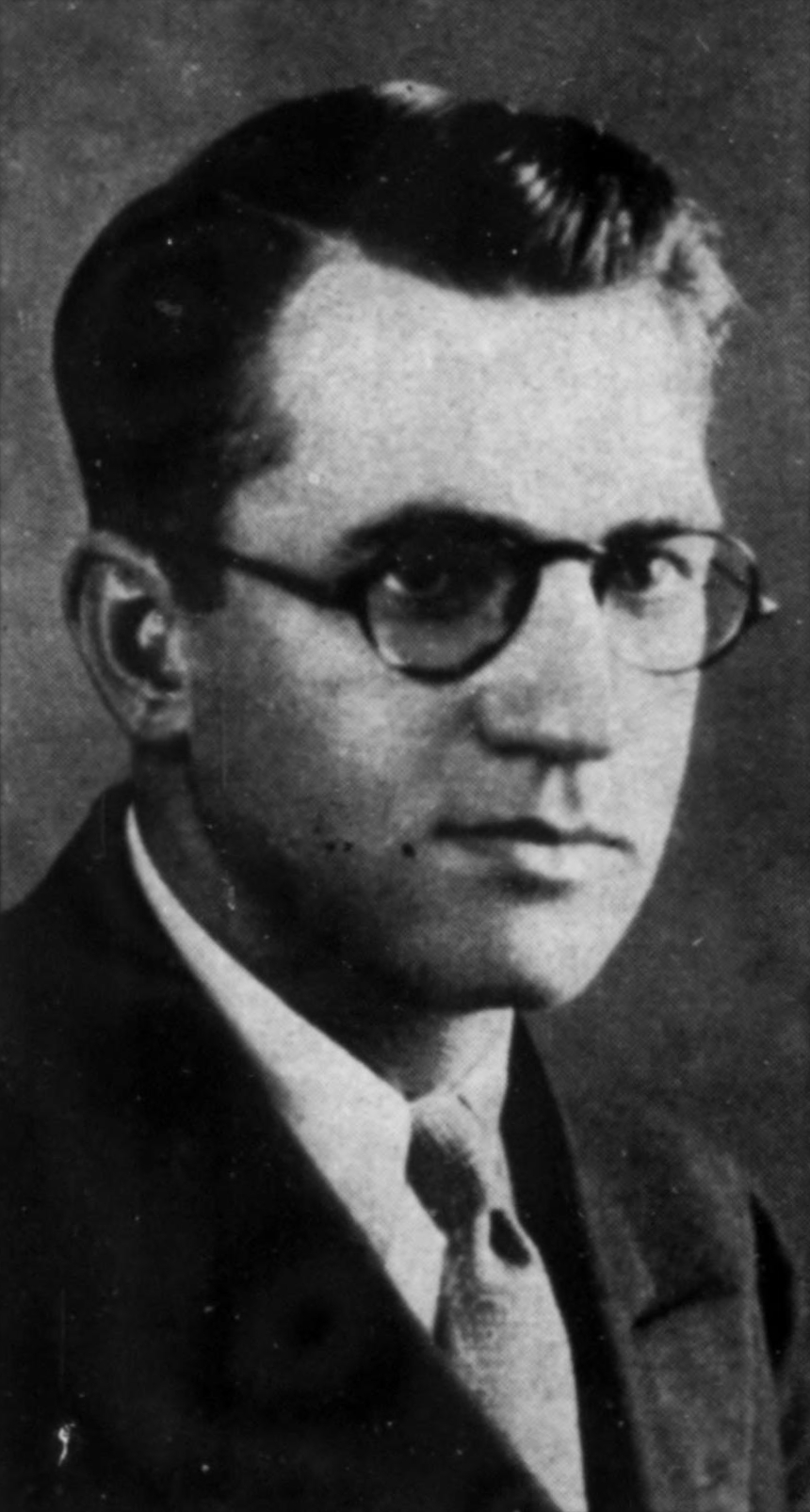
- Brady c. 1938
- Born: May 13, 1901; Marysville, Washington, U.S.
- Died: June 14, 1963 (aged 62); San Francisco, California, U.S.
- Education: Columbia University; Reed College
- Spouses: Dorothy Brady (m. 1924; div. 1936) Mildred Edie Brady (m. 1936)
- Scientific career
- Fields: Economics

Robert Alexander Brady (May 13, 1901 – June 14, 1963) was an American economist who analyzed the dynamics of technological change and the structure of business enterprise. Brady developed a potent analysis of fascism and other emerging authoritarian economic and cultural practices. His essential work is "about power and the organization of power around the logic of technology as operated under capitalism", yielding insights and understanding of modern society's careening path between enhancing or destroying "life and culture".

In The Spirit and Structure of German Fascism (1937) and Business as a System of Power (1943), important works in historical and comparative economics, Brady traced the rise of bureaucratic centralism in Germany, France, Italy, Japan and the United States; and the emergence of an authoritarian model of economic growth and development.

== Education and academia ==
Brady worked his way into and through college, doing undergraduate studies in history, philosophy, and mathematics at Reed College, where he graduated in 1923. He became an instructor in European History upon his graduation. He began his graduate work at Cornell and went on to Columbia, where he completed his Ph.D. in 1929. He had been exposed to Veblen's thought all along the way, most systematically at Columbia, where he worked closely with John Maurice Clark. Brady took Veblen's work as the point of departure for his own professional work. During his years of graduate study, he taught at Cornell, Hunter College, Cooper Union, and New York University. In 1929, Brady joined the faculty at the University of California at Berkeley.

== In standards ==
Brady served as Chief of the Standards Division, Consumers Advisory Board, National Recovery Administration and on the staff of the National Resources Planning Board during the New Deal. He was one of the founders of Consumers Union, its vice president during its formative period, and head of Western Consumers Union.

== Personal ==
Robert Brady was married to mathematician Dorothy Brady from 1924 to 1936, with whom he had a son in 1933. In 1935 Robert Brady met Mildred Edie Brady who he married in 1936. He had two daughters with Mildred: Judy Brady and Joan Brady. Brady had a stroke in 1952 and had limited mobility until his death in 1963.

== Works ==
- "Industrial Standardization." Ph.D. dissertation, Columbia University, 1929
- The Rationalization Movement in German Industry. Berkeley: University of California Press, 1933
- The Spirit and Structure of German Fascism. New York and London: Viking and Victor Gollancz. 1937 – via Internet Archive. Lyle Stuart (1971) ISBN 0806502398
- Business as a System of Power (PDF). New York: Columbia University Press. 1943 – via Internet Archive. Transaction Publishers (2001) ISBN 0765806827; Kessinger (2007), ISBN 0548110964
- "The Economic Impact of Imperial Germany: Industrial Policy." In The Tasks of Economic History (Supplement No. 3 to the Journal of Economic History) (December 1943)
- Crisis in Britain: Plans and Achievements of the Labour Government. Berkeley: University of California Press, 1950
- The Citizen's Stake in Price Control. Paterson, N.J., Littlefield Adams, 1952.
- Organization, Automation, and Society: The Scientific Revolution in Industry. Berkeley: University of California Press, 1961.
