= Michael Mansfield =

English human rights barrister (born 1941)

Michael Mansfield KC
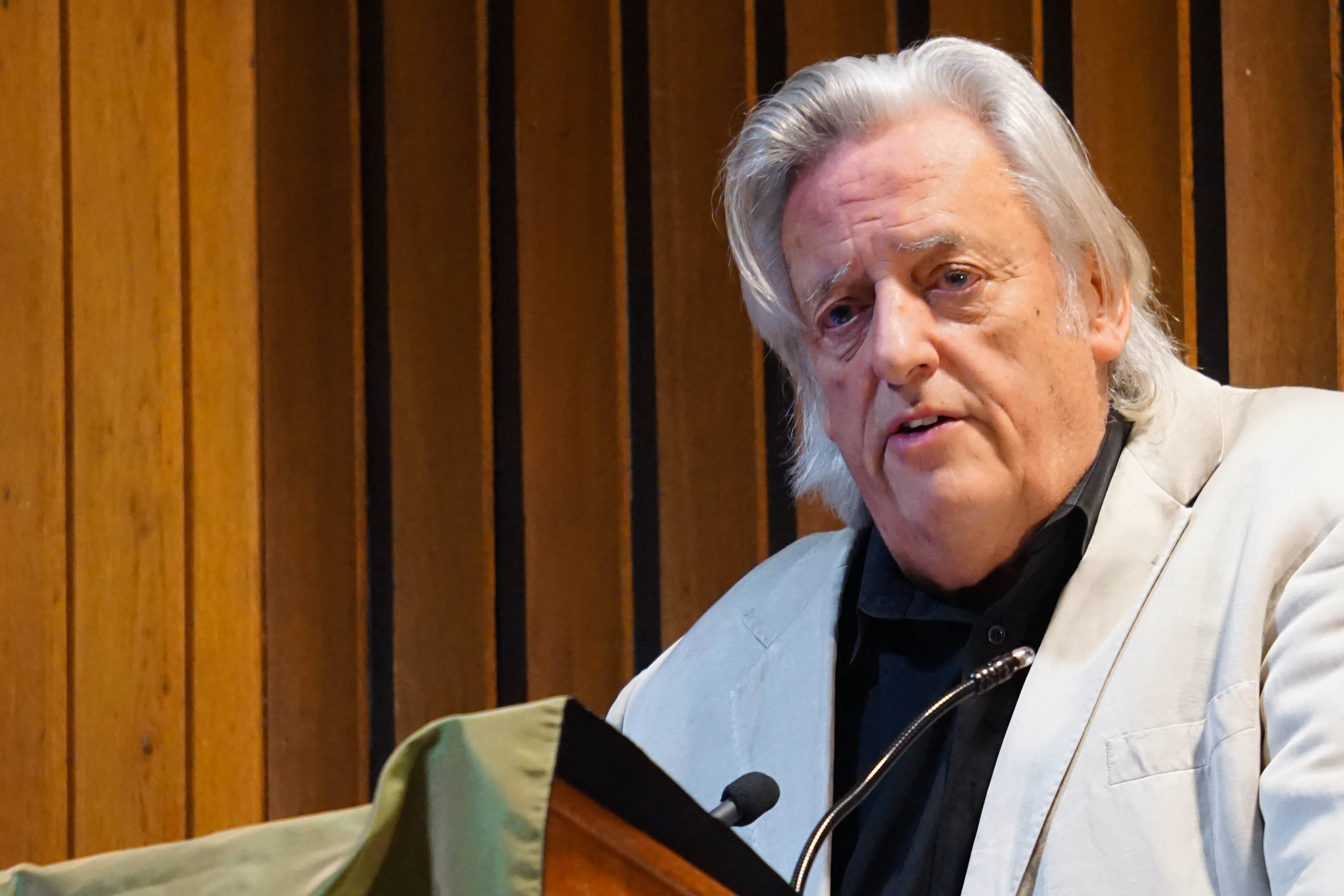
- Mansfield in 2015
- Born: 12 October 1941 (age 84)
- Education: University of Keele
- Occupations: Barrister, legal scholar
- Organisation(s): Haldane Society of Socialist Lawyers; Nexus Chambers
- Known for: Representing: Stephen Lawrence's family; the Guildford Four, the Birmingham Six, Dolours and Marian Price, and others accused of involvement in IRA bombings; the families of the victims of Bloody Sunday; Mohamed Al-Fayed in the inquest into the deaths of his son Dodi Al-Fayed; Princess Diana; the McLibel Two; Barry George in the murder of Jill Dando; the families of the victims of the Hillsborough disaster; the Cambridge Two
- Spouse(s): Melian Bordes (divorced); Yvette Vanson (divorced); Yvette Greenway
- Children: (6) Jonathan, Anna, Louise, Kieran, Leo, Fred

Michael Mansfield KC (born 12 October 1941) is an English barrister and head of chambers at Nexus Chambers. He has been described as "The king of human rights work" by The Legal 500 and as a leading Silk in civil liberties and human rights (including actions against the police).

A British republican, vegetarian, socialist and self-described "radical lawyer", he has participated in prominent and controversial court cases and inquests including the Birmingham Six, the Bloody Sunday massacre, the Hillsborough disaster, the deaths of Jean Charles de Menezes and Princess Diana, and the McLibel case.

== Early life ==
Mansfield grew up in north Finchley, north London, and attended Holmewood Preparatory School (Woodside Park) before going to Highgate School and the University of Keele, where he graduated with a BA (Hons) degree in history and philosophy, and was Secretary of Keele's Students' Union.

== Career ==
Mansfield was called to the bar at Gray's Inn in 1967, became Queen's Counsel in 1989 and was elected as a Bencher of Gray's Inn in 2007.

He is currently the president of the Haldane Society of Socialist Lawyers. Mansfield is an after-dinner and keynote speaker.

=== Notable cases ===
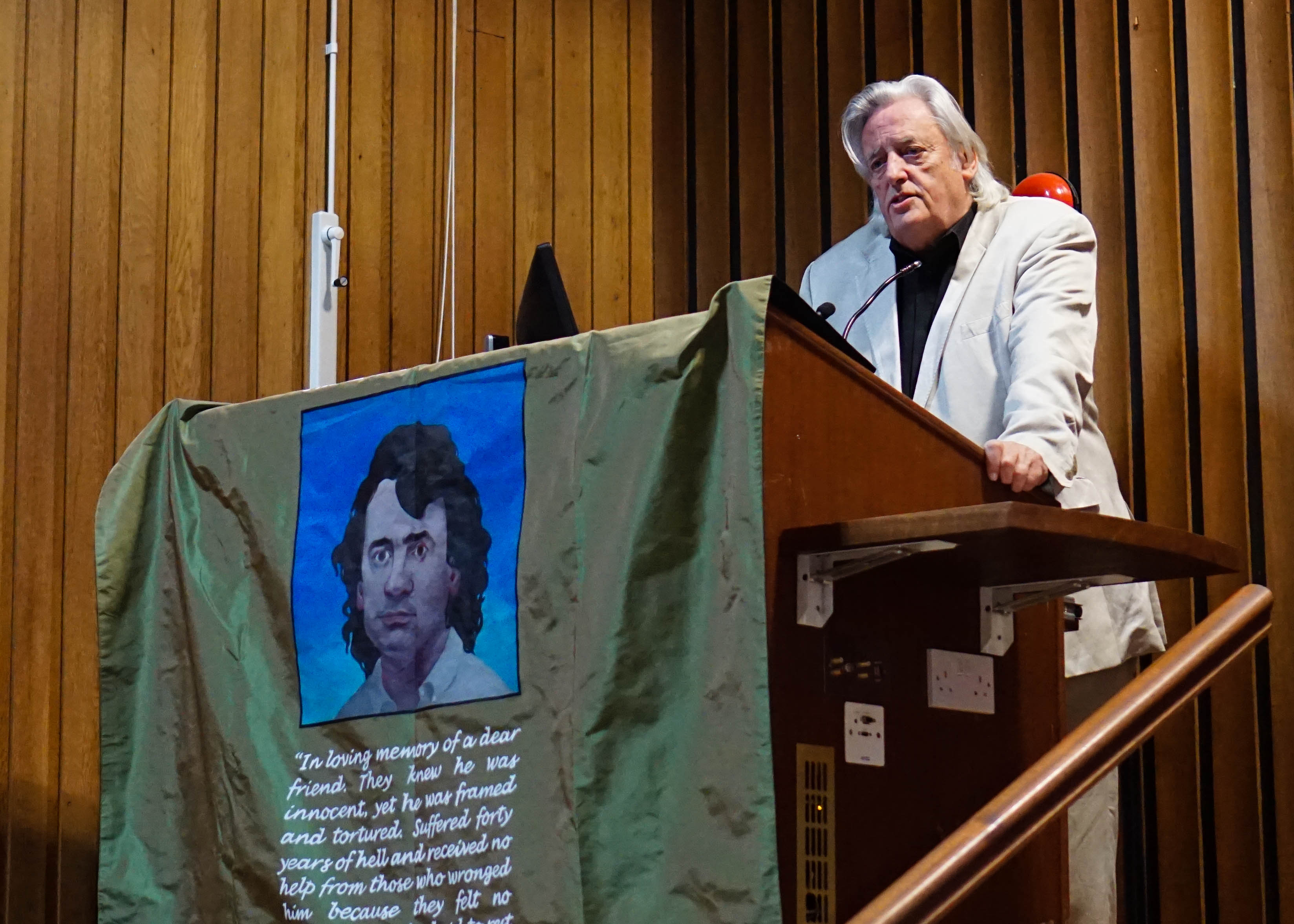
Mansfield gives the first Gerry Conlon Memorial Lecture at St Mary's University College, Belfast, in January 2015

As well as representing those wrongly convicted of the IRA's Guildford and Birmingham pub bombings, Mansfield has represented: the Angry Brigade; Dolours and Marian Price; Brian Keenan; the Orgreave miners; Mahmood Hussein Mattan, Ruth Ellis and James Hanratty (in posthumous appeals); those involved in the Israeli Embassy bombing; Frank Crichlow, owner of the Mangrove restaurant; Stephen Lawrence's family during their private prosecution of his killers; Danny McNamee; Michael Barrymore at the Stuart Lubbock inquest; Barry George both at the inquest into the death of Jill Dando and George's wrongful conviction; the gangster Kenneth Noye; the Bloody Sunday families; Arthur Scargill; Angela Cannings; Colin Norris; Fatmir Limaj, a Kosovo-Albanian leader prosecuted in the Hague; Mohamed al-Fayed in the inquest into the deaths of his son Dodi al-Fayed and Diana, Princess of Wales; the Cambridge Two; the families of Jean Charles de Menezes and Mark Duggan; the Tottenham Three and the Cardiff Five.

In March 2019 Mansfield was engaged by the family of footballer Emiliano Sala to represent their interests in the dispute over his death. In 2025 Mansfield acted on behalf of the Palestinian Centre for Human Rights, helping to prepare and submit a criminal complaint against British nationals accused of atrocities during the Gaza war.

Mansfield has been referred to as a "champagne socialist" though he has said that 95 per cent of his work comes from legal aid.

=== Lockerbie bombing ===
Warning against over-reliance upon forensic science to secure convictions, Mansfield in the BBC Scotland Frontline Scotland TV programme "Silence over Lockerbie", broadcast on 14 October 1997, said he wanted to make just one point:

Forensic science is not immutable. They're not written in tablets of stone, and the biggest mistake that anyone can make—public, expert or anyone else alike—is to believe that forensic science is somehow beyond reproach: it is not! The biggest miscarriages of justice in the United Kingdom, many of them emanate from cases in which forensic science has been shown to be wrong. And the moment a forensic scientist or anyone else says: 'I am sure this marries up with that' I get worried.

== Political views ==
In November 2019, along with other public figures, Mansfield signed a letter supporting Labour Party leader Jeremy Corbyn, describing him as "a beacon of hope in the struggle against emergent far-right nationalism, xenophobia and racism in much of the democratic world", and endorsed Corbyn in the 2019 UK general election. In December 2019, along with 42 other leading cultural figures, he signed a letter endorsing the Labour Party under Jeremy Corbyn's leadership in the 2019 general election. The letter stated that "Labour's election manifesto under Corbyn's leadership offers a transformative plan that prioritises the needs of people and the planet over private profit and the vested interests of a few."

== Charity work ==
He is an environmental and animal rights activist and in 2019 said that meat may become banned in the future, and there should be a law made to criminalise ecocide, or destruction of the environment as a result of intensive animal agriculture. Mansfield is a patron of the animal rights organisation Viva! (Vegetarians International Voice for Animals) and refers to meat production as "genocide".

He is also patron of Hastings Advice and Representation Centre, a charity providing free welfare benefit advice and representation for local people in Hastings, East Sussex and the surrounding area. He is a co-founder and trustee of the charity Silence of Suicide (SOS).

== Personal life ==
Mansfield has been married three times. He was married for 19 years to Melian Bordes, with whom he had five children, Jonathan, Anna, Louise, Leo and Kieran, and for 30 years to Yvette Vanson, from whom he separated in 2014 and with whom he had a son. He has been with his current wife, Yvette Greenway, since 2015. His daughter, Anna, died by suicide in May 2015.

== See also ==
- Hans Köchler's Lockerbie trial observer mission
- Pan Am Flight 103 bombing trial
- University of Cambridge Chancellor election, 2011
