= Potted meat =

Preserving food in fat

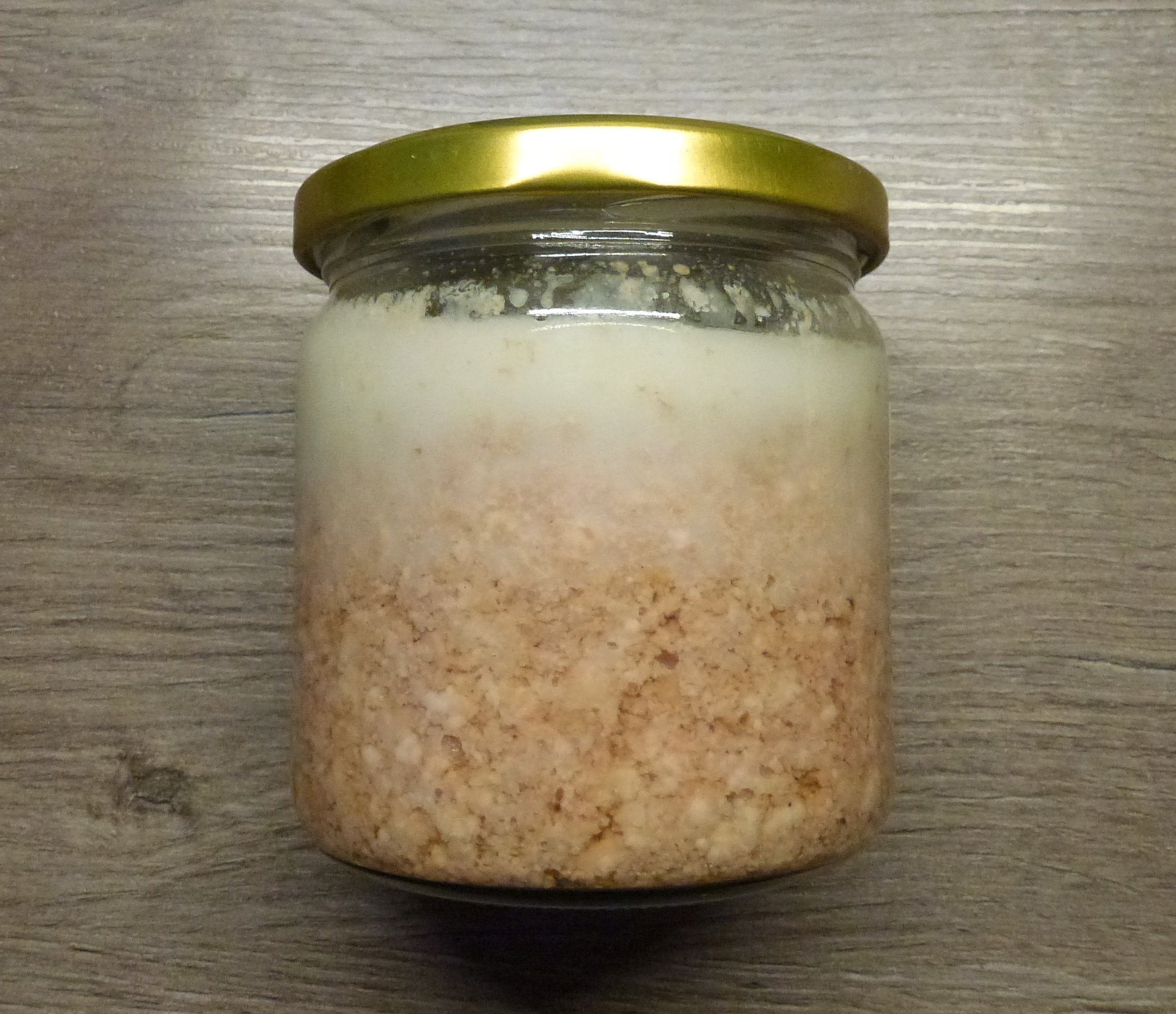
Meat potted in a glass jar

Potting is a form of food preservation in which hot cooked food is placed in a container, tightly packed, and covered with hot fat, such as butter, to exclude air. As the fat cools, it hardens and forms an airtight seal, preventing some spoilage by airborne bacteria.

Potting has been applied to meat (potted meat, ham, tongue, pork, venison, ...), various kinds of fish and seafood (shrimps, char, salmon, lampreys, eels), and other foods (cheese).

Many recipes use a single kind of meat, but others, such as the Flemish potjevleesch, use meats from multiple animals.

Potting was a common form of food preservation before refrigeration and canning. However, spores of Clostridium botulinum can survive cooking at 100 °C (212 °F), which can result in botulism. Thus modern commercial potted foods are sterilized using pressure canning at high temperatures. Potted foods which are not sterilized must be refrigerated.

== Commercial products ==
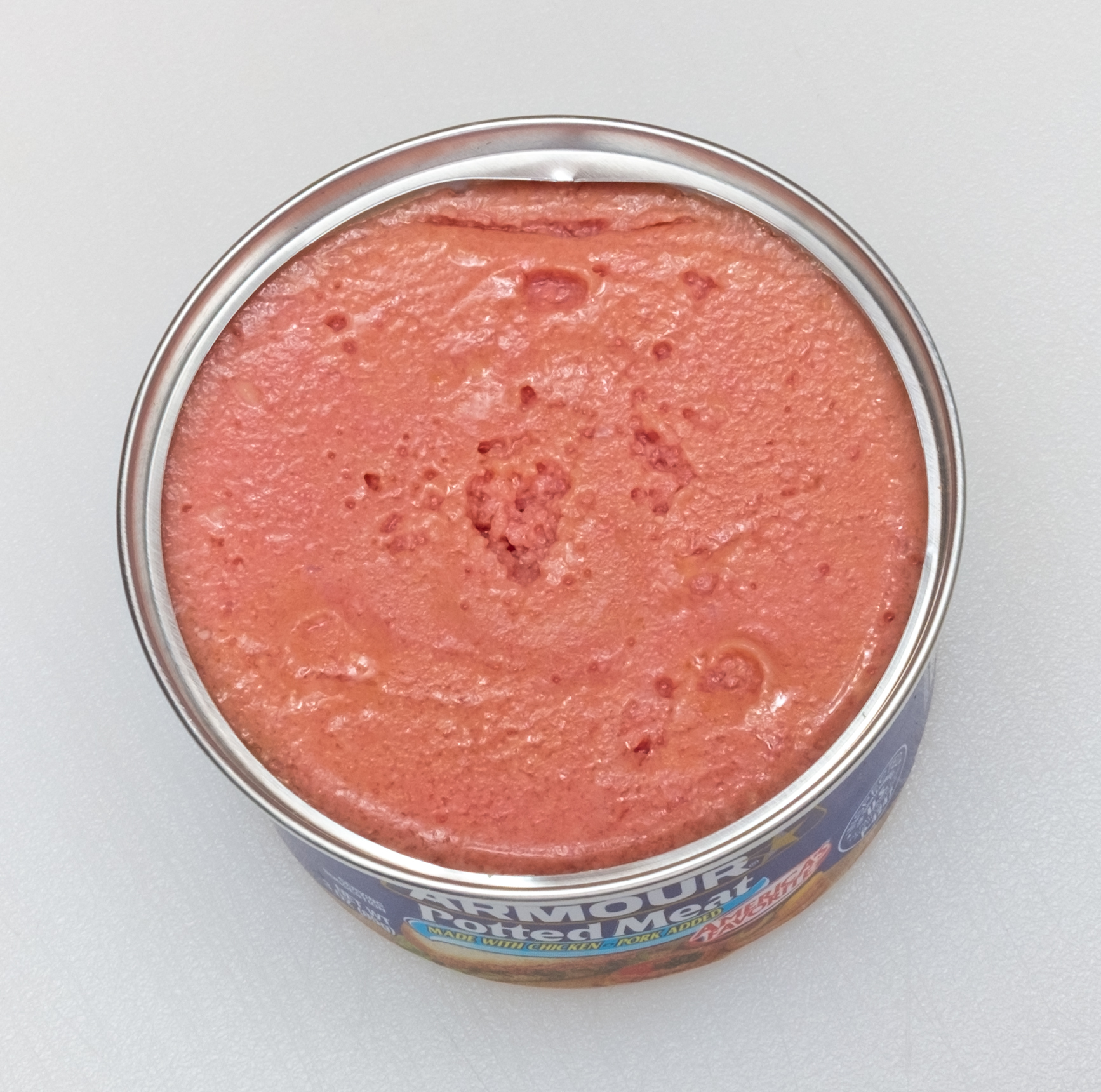
Armour Star brand potted meat food product

A potted meat food product is a food preserved by canning and consisting of various seasoned cooked meats, often puréed, minced, or ground, which is heat-processed and packed into small cans. Unlike earlier potted foods, it does not necessarily include added fat.

Various meats, such as beef, pork, chicken, and turkey, are used. Potted meat food product is produced primarily as a source of affordable meat. Its precooked state and long shelf life make it suitable for emergency food supplies, camping and military uses. Potted meat food product often contains high amounts of fat, salt and preservatives which may make it unhealthy for regular consumption. It typically has a soft, spreadable texture, similar to pâté, and is usually eaten in sandwiches or spread on crackers.

=== Reputation ===
Canned potted meats have a somewhat dubious reputation for their taste, texture, ingredients, preparation and nutrition. The product typically utilizes low-cost ingredients such as mechanically separated chicken or turkey, which is disdained in some communities.

=== Ingredients in US potted meat products ===
- Armour Star potted meat: mechanically separated chicken, pork, water, salt, mustard, garlic powder, vinegar, natural flavor, dextrose, sodium erythorbate, and sodium nitrite.
- Hormel potted meat: beef tripe, mechanically separated chicken, beef hearts, partially defatted cooked beef fatty tissue, meat broth, vinegar, garlic powder, onion powder, salt, flavoring, sugar, and sodium nitrite.
- Great Value (Walmart) potted meat: mechanically separated chicken, pork, water, salt, mustard, garlic powder, vinegar, dextrose, sodium erythorbate, sodium nitrite, natural flavors, caramel color.
- Libby's potted meat (since discontinued): mechanically separated chicken, pork skin, partially defatted cooked pork fatty tissue, partially defatted cooked beef fatty tissue, vinegar, salt, spices, sugar, flavorings, sodium erythorbate and sodium nitrite.
- Underwood Deviled Ham: ham (cured with water, salt, brown sugar, sodium nitrite), mustard flour, spices, turmeric.

== See also ==
- Confit
- Corned beef
- Deviled ham
- Food preservation
- Home canning
- Pâté
- Potted shrimps
- Rillettes
- Spam (food)
- Tushonka
- Vienna sausage
