= Dexter Masters =

American novelist

Dexter Wright Masters (June 15, 1909 – January 5, 1989), was an American editor and novelist who wrote extensively about the dangers of the atomic bomb.

== Early life and career ==
Masters, a nephew of the poet Edgar Lee Masters, was born in Springfield, Illinois, and studied at the University of Chicago. After working for Time and Fortune magazines, he became the first editor of Tide, a marketing trade journal, age 22. During the Second World War, Masters served on the communications staff of the US Air Force, worked with several research laboratories including the Radiation Laboratory at MIT, for which he edited Radar, a classified publication.

== Books ==
Masters co-edited with nuclear physicist Katharine Way (1903–1995) the 1946 New York Times bestseller One World or None: a Report to the Public on the Full Meaning of the Atomic Bomb. The book included essays by Niels Bohr, Albert Einstein, and J. Robert Oppenheimer, and sold over 100,000 copies. In 1955, Masters published a novel, The Accident, detailing the last eight days of a nuclear physicist dying from radiation sickness after a criticality accident, based on the death of physicist Louis Slotin who died after such an accident in 1946. The novel was so controversial the US banned a movie version of it. A series of radio programs on the bomb earned Masters a Peabody Award in 1963.

== On staff of Consumers Union ==
Shortly after its founding in 1936, Masters joined the staff of Consumers Union, publisher of the magazine Consumer Reports, where he headed a task force publicizing the dangers of cigarette smoking. In the late 1950s, he was instrumental in the organization's analysis of milk samples from around the country for radiation, thus making widely available for the first time information about the fallout dangers of atmospheric nuclear tests. He became director of Consumers Union in 1958, a position he held until 1963.

Masters also contributed to the New Yorker, The Saturday Evening Post, the American Scholar, and other publications.

== Personal life ==
Masters dated Mildred Edie Brady and later married her daughter, Joan Brady. Their son Alexander Masters is also a writer. He moved to Totnes, Devon, England in 1960, where he died in 1989.
