= Haldane Society of Socialist Lawyers =

UK socialist and legal campaigning organisation

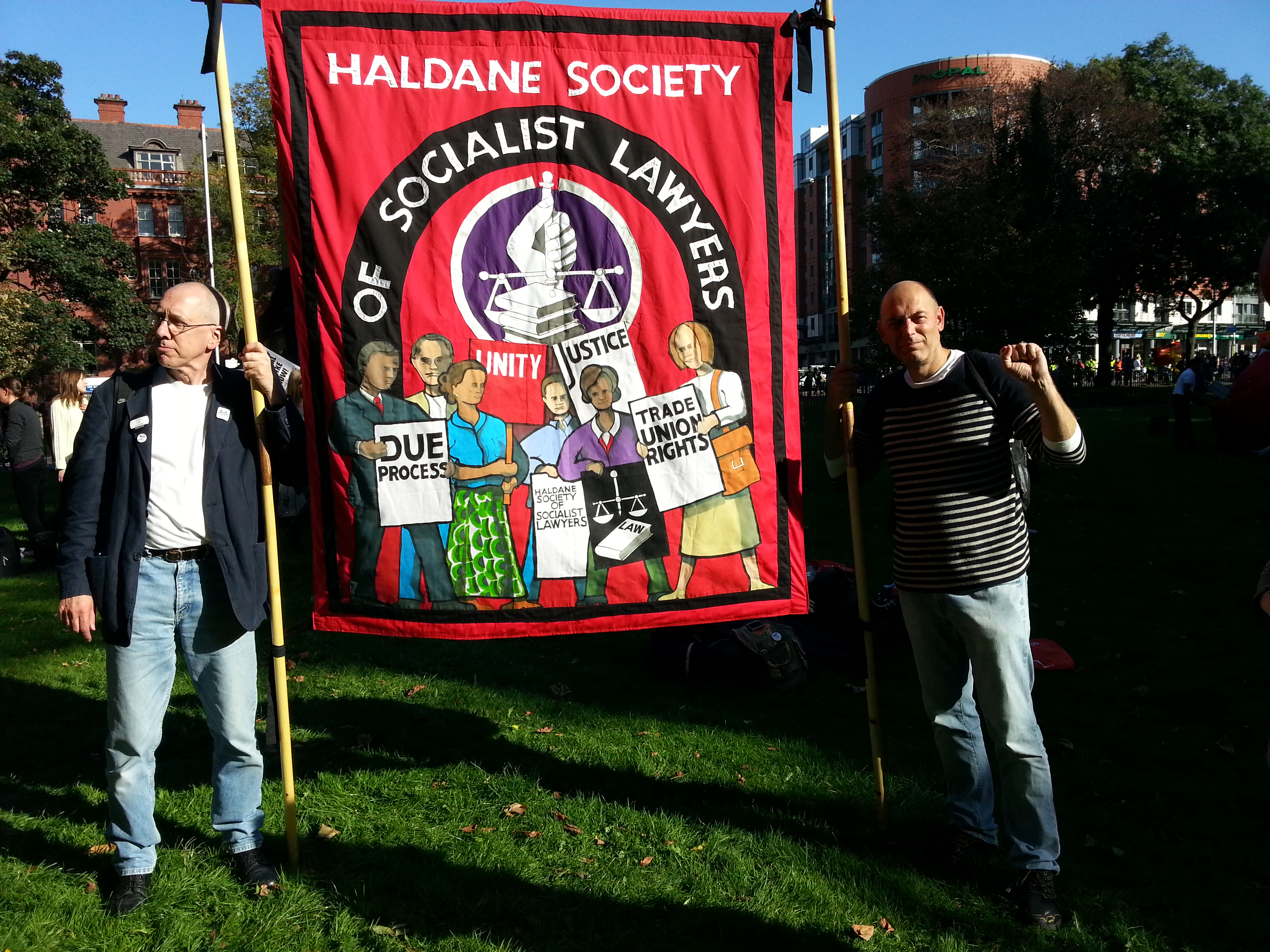
- Haldane Society banner, September 2013
- Formation: 1930; 96 years ago
- Headquarters: London, England
- Official language: English
- President: Michael Mansfield
- Chair: Declan Owens and Hannah Webb
- Affiliations: Politically independent
- Website: haldane.org

The Haldane Society of Socialist Lawyers is a socialist and legal campaigning organisation in the United Kingdom. It was founded in 1930 to provide legal support to the then Labour government. The Society was named after Viscount Haldane (1856–1928), a Liberal and subsequently Labour Party politician, who had been Lord Chancellor in H. H. Asquith's government from 1912 to 1915 and subsequently in 1924 during the first ever Labour administration.

The Haldane Society of Socialist Lawyers is now politically independent, unlike the Society of Labour Lawyers, which is affiliated to the Labour Party, and was formed after the Haldane Society split in 1949 over the question of membership for members of the Communist Party.

== Membership ==
Members who have gone on to serve prominent roles in the Labour Party include Prime Minister Clement Attlee, Chancellor Stafford Cripps, John Platts-Mills, who was expelled from the Party in 1948 for Soviet sympathies, and Sir Keir Starmer, former Prime Minister and leader of the Labour Party.

Sir Keir Starmer joined the society in the late 1980s. He remained a member until 2008, departing upon his appointment as Director of Public Prosecutions. During this period, Starmer served as secretary and championed a failed proposal to remove "socialist" from the group's name, substituting "progressive" or "democratic". During the group's 2021 AGM, Starmer was censured for his policies since assuming leadership of the party the previous year. The members objected to Starmer whipping MPs and peers to abstain on the "Spy Cops Bill", as well as to his positions on migrants' rights, "silencing" pro-Palestinian voices in the party, and his failure to "condemn" Islamophobia, anti-black racism, and anti-transgender views in the party.

Since the 2023 AGM, the society's president is Michael Mansfield and it is chaired by Declan Owens and Hannah Webb. Past vice-presidents and officers have included Jack Gaster, Geoffrey Bindman, Liz Davies, Anthony Gifford, 6th Baron Gifford, Helena Kennedy, Baroness Kennedy of The Shaws, John Hendy, Baron Hendy, David Turner-Samuels, Imran Khan, Louise Christian and Gareth Peirce.

== Affiliations ==
On the international level, the organisation is a member of the International Association of Democratic Lawyers and European Democratic Lawyers.

== Archives ==
Some of the Society's records are held by The National Archives (United Kingdom).
