= Dorothy Brady =

American mathematician and economist (1903–1977)

Dorothy E. Stahl Brady
- Brady, from the 1924 yearbook of Reed College
- Born: June 14, 1903; Elk River, Minnesota, U.S.
- Died: April 17, 1977 (aged 73); Pine Hill, New York, U.S.
- Education: University of California, Berkeley; Cornell University; Reed College
- Spouse: Robert A. Brady (m. 1924; div. 1936)
- Scientific career
- Fields: Mathematics; Economics
- Workplaces: Wharton School of the University of Pennsylvania; University of Chicago
- Doctoral advisor: John Hector McDonald

Dorothy Elizabeth Stahl Brady (June 14, 1903 – April 17, 1977) was an American mathematician and economist. She was a professor of economics at Wharton School of the University of Pennsylvania from 1958 to 1970.

== Early life ==
Born in Elk River, Minnesota, she grew up in Portland, Oregon, attending Lincoln High School and later Reed College studying mathematics and physics. She graduated from Reed in 1924. She was married to fellow Reed student Robert A. Brady from 1924 to 1936, they had a son in 1933.

== Education and career ==
Brady earned a master's degree in mathematics from Cornell University in 1926, then worked as an instructor at Vassar College, as a research assistant at the National Bureau of Economic Research, and a studied and taught at New York University. She went on to complete a Ph.D. in mathematics from University of California, Berkeley in 1933, and was the 6th woman ever to do so.

Brady went on to a long career in government working for the U.S. Department of Agriculture and the U.S. Department of Labor where she was the chief of the cost of living division from 1944 to 1948, and the Bureau of Labor Statistics where she was the chief of division of prices and cost of living in 1953.

She returned to academia as a professor in 1956 at the University of Chicago, was chairman of the graduate group in economic history from 1964 to 1970 at the Wharton School of the University of Pennsylvania. She continued to consult to the Bureau of Labor Statistics and the Social Security Administration during her academic tenure.

== Publications ==
- "Variations in Family Living Expenditures" (1938)
- "Savings and the Income Distribution" (1947, with Rose D. Friedman)
- "Equal Pay for Women Workers" (1947)
- "Family Budgets: A Historical Survey" (1948)
- "The Pattern of Food Expenditures" (1948, with Helen A. Barber)
- "The Use of Statistical Procedures in the Derivation of Family Budgets" (1949)
- "Family Savings in Relation to Changes in the Level and Distribution of Income" (1952)
- "Individual Incomes and the Structure of Consumer Units" (1958)
- "Relative Prices in the Nineteenth Century" (1964)

== Honors ==
Brady received the National Women's Press Club Award in Economics, and was book review editor of the Journal of Economic History from 1969 to 1974. Brady became a Fellow of the American Statistical Association in 1949 and Fellow of the Econometric Society in 1950.
