= Country Life =

Country Life may refer to:

- Rural lifestyle

== Literature ==
- Country Life (books), publications compiled from the articles and photographic archives of Country Life magazine
- Country Life (magazine), a British weekly magazine
- Country Life in America, later renamed Country Life, an American magazine
- The Country Life, a 1997 novel by Rachel Cusk
- Country Life, a 1978 poetry collection by Peter Ackroyd

== Music ==
- Country Life (Roxy Music album), 1974
- Country Life (Show of Hands album), 2003

== Other uses ==
- Country Life (film), a 1994 Australian film
- Country Life, a UK brand of butter and milk owned by Saputo Dairy UK
- Country life movement, a 20th-century American social movement
