= Theory of War =

1992 novel by Joan Brady

- First edition (UK)
- Author: Joan Brady
- Language: English
- Publisher: Andre Deutsch (UK); Knopf (US)
- Publication date: 1992 (UK), 1993 (US)
- Publication place: United States
- Media type: Print
- ISBN: 0-233-98810-6

Theory of War is a 1992 novel by American-British writer Joan Brady. It took Brady ten years to write but was rejected by her US agent. It was then published by UK publisher Andre Deutsch and was well received. It became the 1993 Whitbread Novel of the Year and Book of the Year in the UK, won the Prix du Meilleur Livre Étranger in France (as L’Enfant Loué. 1995) and was awarded a National Endowment for the Arts grant in the US.

== Plot ==
It tells the story of her grandfather, Jonathan, a white child sold as a slave right after the American Civil War when the Emancipation Proclamation meant that African Americans could no longer be sold, and so many soldiers had died in the war that there were thousands of orphans. The psychological consequences of such a background—for Jonathan himself and for the generations that followed him—are the main concern of the novel.
