= The Strange Case of Wilhelm Reich =

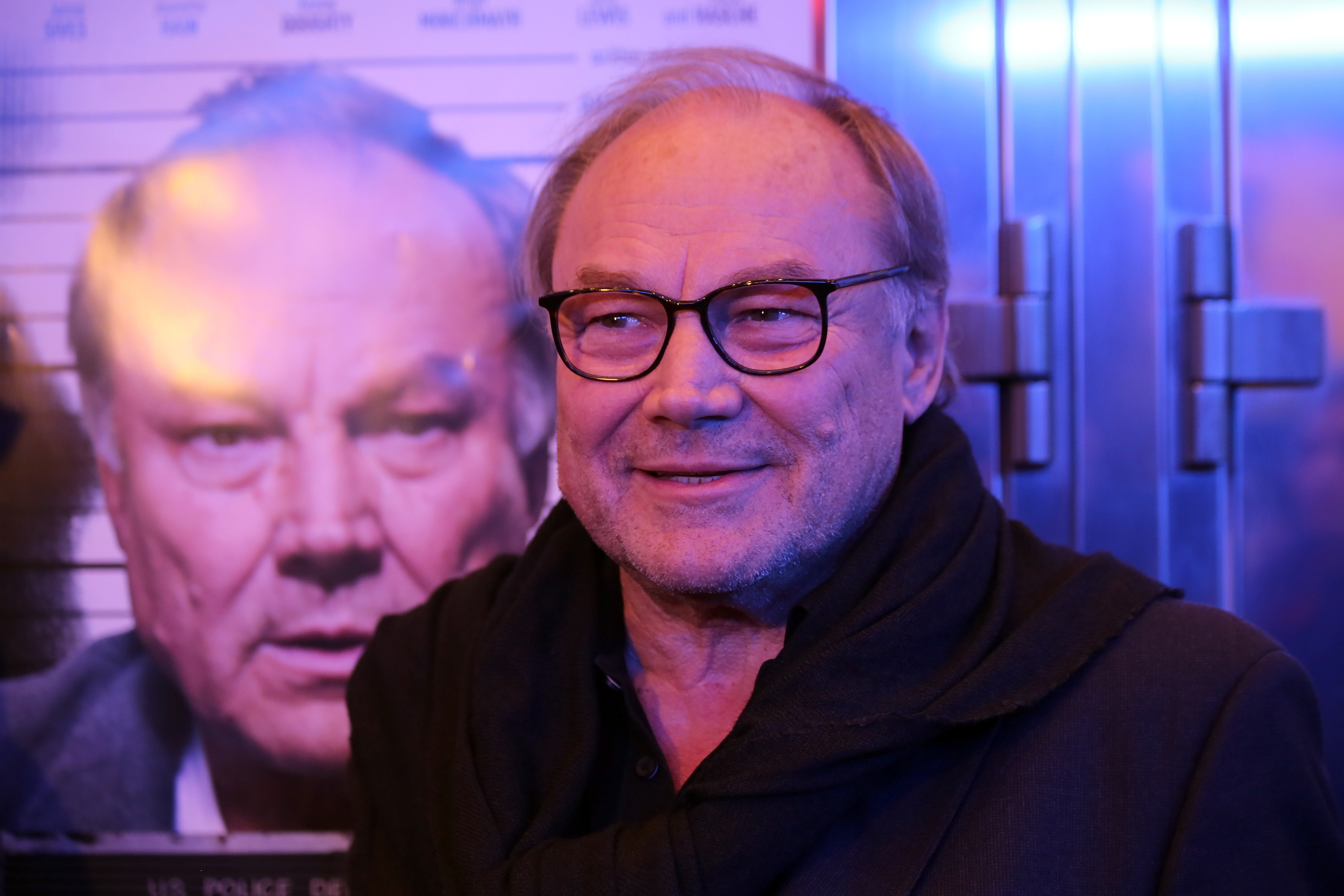
- Actor Klaus Maria Brandauer at the premiere of The Strange Case of Wilhelm Reich, Vienna International Film Festival 2012
- Directed by: Antonin Svoboda
- Starring: Klaus Maria Brandauer
- Release date: 2012
- Language: English

The Strange Case of Wilhelm Reich is a 2012 Austrian film about Wilhelm Reich directed by Antonin Svoboda and starring Klaus Maria Brandauer as Reich.

== Background ==
The title is a reference to the article with the same name of Mildred Edie Brady.

The director of the film, Antonin Svoboda, also made a documentary about Wilhelm Reich with the title Who is afraid of Wilhelm Reich.
