= Life of M =

2026 Novel by Rachel Cusk

- 2026 Book jacket
- Author: Rachel Cusk
- Audio read by: Rachel Cusk
- Language: English
- Genre: Novel
- Set in: An unnamed European capital
- Published: August 25, 2026
- Publisher: Farrar, Straus and Giroux
- Media type: Print, E-book, Audio
- ISBN: 9780374618384
- OCLC: 1587906816
- Website: Official website

Life of M is a novel written by Rachel Cusk. It was published by Farrar, Straus and Giroux in 2026. In this story, the narrator is chronicling the life of the actress known to readers only as M.

== Synopsis ==
Coverage of this book by reviewers and the media says that the life events of the main character, known as M, could be based upon Natalie Portman's documented public life, including when Portman was a child actor. However, Marc Weingarten of the Los Angeles Times does not see this as important. He says, "Forget the celebrity rumors. Rachel Cusk’s new book, ‘Life of M,’ reveals how all of us now navigate the uncanny gap between public and private personas." According to Parul Sehgal, writing for The New York Times Magazine, "... a slight, minimalist novel has become unlikely tabloid fodder."

== Reception ==
Alexandra Jacobs of The New York Times writes, "Cusk is one of the cleverest and foremost practitioners of autofiction, turning to the form after her memoirs of motherhood and divorce produced their own media discomforts... Life of M continues in that mode: rarefied, cosmopolitan, self-serious, a place where the Wi-Fi doesn’t work. The air up there where Cusk seems to be living and writing these days is gaspingly thin. She’s missed down here on Earth."

Becca Rothfeld, reviewing this work for The New Yorker magazine says, "An unwieldy book with three disparate threads, each focused on a different character ... it is discombobulated and haphazard, a machine breaking down at random ... At times, Life of M threatens to become a book composed entirely of vacuities ... There is something at once magisterial and leadenly self-regarding about the melancholic rhythms of Cusk’s prose, with its stiff and stately syntax and its utter impatience with the real vagaries of difference."

The Washington Post reviewer, Valerie Stivers. says, "Cusk is brilliant, but her skill has always been in reducing the human to the product of cold existential forces: the violent struggle between men and women; the wounds left by abuse; the emptiness at the heart of identity. In other words, a Cusk book about you is never going to be flattering.

According to Marc Weingarten of The Los Angeles Times, "Rachel Cusk is not a people pleaser. The prolific, award-winning British author’s novels are often plotless, discursive and frustratingly obtuse. Yet Cusk has found a large fan base for her work, mainly because she is a deft excavator of the human psyche, a writer who can articulate emotional states with uncanny precision and insight. On a formal level, Cusk’s new book, Life Of M, closely adheres to the rigorously calibrated approach that has been so successful for her across 11 novels. In classic Cusk fashion, Life of M unfolds from the inside out."
