= Cambridge Two =

Formerly imprisoned British charity workers

The Cambridge Two (also known as the Wintercomfort Two) were British homeless charity managers, Ruth Wyner and John Brock, who were imprisoned in December 1999 having been judged not to have taken reasonable steps to prevent heroin dealing at Wintercomfort, the Cambridge homeless centre that they were managing. The incident became a cause célèbre leading to a public campaign for their release. They successfully appealed the length of their sentence and were released from prison on 11 July 2000. However, they were unsuccessful in their appeal in December 2000 to overturn their conviction.

== Ruth Wyner ==
Ruth Avril Wyner was born in London on 1 April 1950 to Anna (née Nagley), a mosaic artist, and Percy Wyner, a cloth merchant. She was educated at St Paul's Girls' School. After leaving school, she spent time in a North Devon ashram and edited an alternative magazine started by John Hopkins. She moved to Norwich and started work as a journalist in 1970 at the Eastern Daily News. Whilst in Norwich, she met Gordon Bell to whom she got married in 1978. He was the lead guitarist of a band she had joined called Crazy Lizard. They had two children together, Joel and Rachel.

Whilst Wyner was in Norwich, her younger brother killed himself by jumping from a window at a London homeless hostel. This event led her to become increasingly involved in charity work, helping homeless people. From 1979, she worked at St Martin's Housing Trust as a part-time night shelter worker before becoming a manager and finally the deputy director of the charity. She was sacked for gross misconduct in 1993 based on claims that she was not intervening to stop residents from using cannabis. She denied this and took St Martin's to an employment tribunal, however the tribunal found in favour of her employer.

Nonetheless, Wyner had gained a prominent reputation amongst local homeless charities by this point so, after establishing the Herring Housing Trust in Great Yarmouth and working there as a coordinator, she was headhunted in 1995 to become the director of the Wintercomfort charity in Cambridge.

In 1998, she was arrested in her office at Wintercomfort, leading to her conviction and imprisonment in 1999. After leaving prison in July 2000, she was diagnosed with breast cancer. She later became a tai chi instructor and joined the Cambridge Group Therapy Centre as a therapist, becoming clinical lead between 2011 and 2018.

Wyner died on 29 December 2024.

== John Brock ==
John Brock studied printing and typographic design at Norwich City College.

He worked as a printing teacher at Cambridgeshire College of Arts and Technology between 1979 and 1983. From 1983, he worked as a part-time community service supervisor for the Cambridge Probation Service. In 1990, he became a project worker for the Cyrenean Bus Project, which ultimately merged with the Wintercomfort charity.

By 2005, he was living in a cottage in Little Abington.

== Wintercomfort charity ==
The Wintercomfort charity originally operated within an old bus in a car park in Cambridge. After Ruth Wyner became director in 1995, the charity eventually moved to a four-storey building converted from a dancing school. They operated a day centre, a winter night centre, and an outreach team. Between 70 and 120 people used the service each day.

Cambridgeshire police had alerted Wyner to the fact that drugs were being dealt at Wintercomfort, and so she worked with them to develop an anti-drugs policy. However, the charity had a confidentiality policy (which was common in the homeless charity sector) so, when asked by police, Wyner would not hand over the names of individuals who were suspected of dealing drugs at the centre.

== Arrest and conviction ==
Wyner had negotiated with Cambridge City Council to get a new £400,000 night shelter built close to a residential area in the city. Shortly after this, the police installed a hidden camera across the street from Wintercomfort on the roof of Jesus College rowing club. Over a period of two months, two undercover police officers, nicknamed Ed and Swampy, made 12 visits to the charity's grounds posing as homeless men. With 300 hours of footage recorded, the undercover police were captured in the footage successfully purchasing heroin on eight occasions.

Following the undercover police investigation, police officers entered Wintercomfort's premises in May 1998 and informed Wyner in her attic office that they had arrested eight men who frequented the charity's grounds of drug dealing offences. They also informed her that they were going to arrest her, "for knowingly allowing the distribution of a class A drug on the charity premises." Brock was also arrested.

At the resulting trial at King's Lynn Crown Court, the prosecution argued that the charity was "almost a supermarket for heroin." It was established during the trial that Wyner and Brock were never present when the dealing was occurring. The judge overseeing the trial, Jonathan Haworth, said that there was no evidence that either Wyner or Brock had benefited from or encouraged the drug dealing.

They were found guilty in December 1999 under Section 8 of the Misuse of Drugs Act 1971. Section 8 criminalises owners or managers who knowingly permit drug dealing on their premises. Wyner and Brock were sentenced to five and four years in prison, respectively. Both Wyner and Brock were imprisoned at HMP Highpoint in Suffolk.

== Protests and appeal ==
There was outrage at the convictions from charity workers, academics, and Members of Parliament from all parties. Protests, fundraising gigs, and vigils were held in the months following the pair's conviction. On 20 March 2000, Brock's son and Wyner's daughter delivered a petition of 20,000 signatures to the Home Office calling for their parents' release.

The writer Alexander Masters helped organise the campaign to secure Wyner and Brock's release. Stuart Shorter – a homeless man who Masters wrote a 2005 biography of called Stuart: A Life Backwards – undertook a three day occupation of the pavement in front of the Home Office in protest at the conviction. Wyner later praised their vigorous campaigning saying, "I owe them everything." A television drama based on the biography was directed by David Attwood and co-produced by the BBC and HBO. It aired in the UK on 23 September 2007 and starred Benedict Cumberbatch as Masters, Tom Hardy as Shorter, Joanna Maude as Wyner, and Trevor Sellers as Brock.

In January 2000, a High Court judge granted leave to both Brock and Wyner to appeal their sentence length, but would not grant them leave to appeal their conviction.

The pair's legal team at the appeal was led by Michael Mansfield. He argued that, in the original trial, Judge Jonathan Haworth had not given the jury enough leeway to conclude whether Brock and Wyner had taken reasonable steps to prevent drug dealing on the premises. The appeal was centred upon the matter of whether Wyner and Brock's duty to inform the police of hostel residents' drug dealing was outweighed by their duty to client confidentiality.

On 11 July 2000, the Court of Appeal ruled in favour of Wyner and Brock and both were released on bail after 207 days in prison.

The appeal judges – referring to the original trial – stated, "It is apparent that the jury could only have concluded that both appellants were aware of, or shut their eyes to, an obviously significant level of dealing." Of Wyner and Brock, the judges acknowledged that the pair, "lacked the evil motive usually a feature of criminal behaviour,” and were, “caring for the unfortunate, doing a job which few would enjoy." They did, however, also state that the book kept at Wintercomfort used to record the names of people who were banned due to drug usage or dealing, "demonstrated both the rarity of bans of any significant length and the repeated flaunting of such bans as were imposed."

A campaign calling for an overhaul of the Misuse of Drugs Act was backed by Michael Winner, Julie Christie, and Tom Stoppard in response to the conviction.

In December 2000, Wyner and Brock lost their appeal to overturn their convictions with the judgement stating, "no one, however well-intentioned, can with impunity permit their premises to be used for the supply of Class A drugs."

== Consequences ==
In 2003, the Home Office proposed amending Section 8 of the Misuse of Drugs Act in order to extend its scope to cover all controlled drugs. There was outrage from the parts of the charity sector that would potentially be affected, as this proposal would harden rather than relax the law. The national umbrella organisation for the sector, Homeless Link, warned that such a change could lead to organisations potentially losing their charitable status and even being forced to operate outside of the law.

The Home Office announced a moratorium on the proposed changes and, in December 2004, the Government abandoned its intention to amend Section 8, releasing the statement, "The Government is clear that those who work in the drug treatment and homelessness sector should not be penalised in engaging and providing services for hard-to-reach and vulnerable groups."

In 2005, Kevin Flemen, a drugs policy expert, described the ramifications of the Wintercomfort incident on the sector positively, stating, "The situation is as good now as it has been for a long time. Provided you are attempting to work legally, the chances of prosecution are vanishingly slim. And that slim chance can be further reduced by a good relationship with the police." Referencing Wintercomfort directly, he said, "Wintercomfort was held up because of, in the eyes of the police, the sheer scale of supply. They were saying, 'essentially you lost control of the building, you were intimidated by dealers, but despite this, there were measures available to you that you were unwilling to use'."

Martin Goodwin, a development officer at Homeless Link, spoke in 2005 about the necessity for managers of agencies to maintain a robust drugs policy in order to keep themselves on the right side of the law, "Most important - and this is where Wintercomfort fell down - it should be a flexible policy that you interpret rigidly rather than a rigid policy you interpret flexibly. You can set bans between 12 hours and 12 months. If people are doing things that are really unsafe, then you can work with them because you have the flexibility."
