= Alexander Masters =

English author and screenwriter

Alexander Wright Masters is an English author, screenwriter, and worker with the homeless. He lives in Cambridge, United Kingdom.

== Profile ==
Masters is the son of authors Dexter Masters and Joan Brady. He was educated at Bedales School, and took a first in physics from King's College London. He then went to St Edmund's College, Cambridge for a further degree in maths, and then the beginnings of a PhD in the philosophy of quantum mechanics. He was studying for an MSc degree in mathematics with the Open University, and working as an assistant at a hostel for the homeless in Cambridge, when he wrote his first book.

He is the writer and illustrator of the biography Stuart: A Life Backwards (ISBN 0-00-720037-4), his best-known book. As the title suggests, the book starts from Shorter's adult life, tracing it back in time through his troubled childhood, examining the effects his family, schooling and disability had on his eventual state. Masters authored the book with Shorter's active and enthusiastic help.

Masters and Shorter jointly helped campaign to secure the release of the Cambridge Two (Ruth Wyner and John Brock) who had been convicted in 1999 of failing to prevent heroin from being dealt at the Cambridge homeless shelter they were managing. Masters helped to organise protests and provided administrative help whilst Shorter undertook a three day occupation of the pavement in front of the Home Office in protest of the conviction. Wyner and Brock were released following a successful appeal in July 2000, and Wyner later praised Masters and Shorter's vigorous campaigning, saying: "I owe them everything."

Alexander Masters won an Arts Council Writers' Award for Stuart and went on to win the Guardian First Book Award and the Hawthornden Prize. The book was also shortlisted (in the biography category) for the Whitbread Book-of-the-Year Award, the Samuel Johnson Prize, and the National Book Critics Circle Award in the United States. He also wrote a screenplay adaptation, filmed in 2006 for the BBC and HBO, and broadcast in September 2007. It won the Royal Television Society Award in the Single Drama category and the Reims International Television award for the Best TV Screenplay.

In 2007, he collaborated with photographer Adrian Clarke on the book Gary's Friends, chronicling the lives of drug and alcohol abusers in North East England.

Masters is also the author of The Genius in My Basement (ISBN 9780007243389), a biography of mathematician Simon P. Norton.

In 2016, Masters published A Life Discarded: 148 Diaries Found in a skip, ISBN 9780008130770 (US title A Life Discarded: 148 Diaries Found in the Trash, ISBN 9780374178185).

Alexander Masters has been portrayed by Benedict Cumberbatch in Stuart: A Life Backwards, the 2007 BBC dramatization of his biography of Stuart Shorter.

== Publications ==
- Masters, Alexander (2011), The Genius in My Basement, Harper Collins Ome, ISBN 978-0-00-744527-1
