= Confit =

Type of food preservation

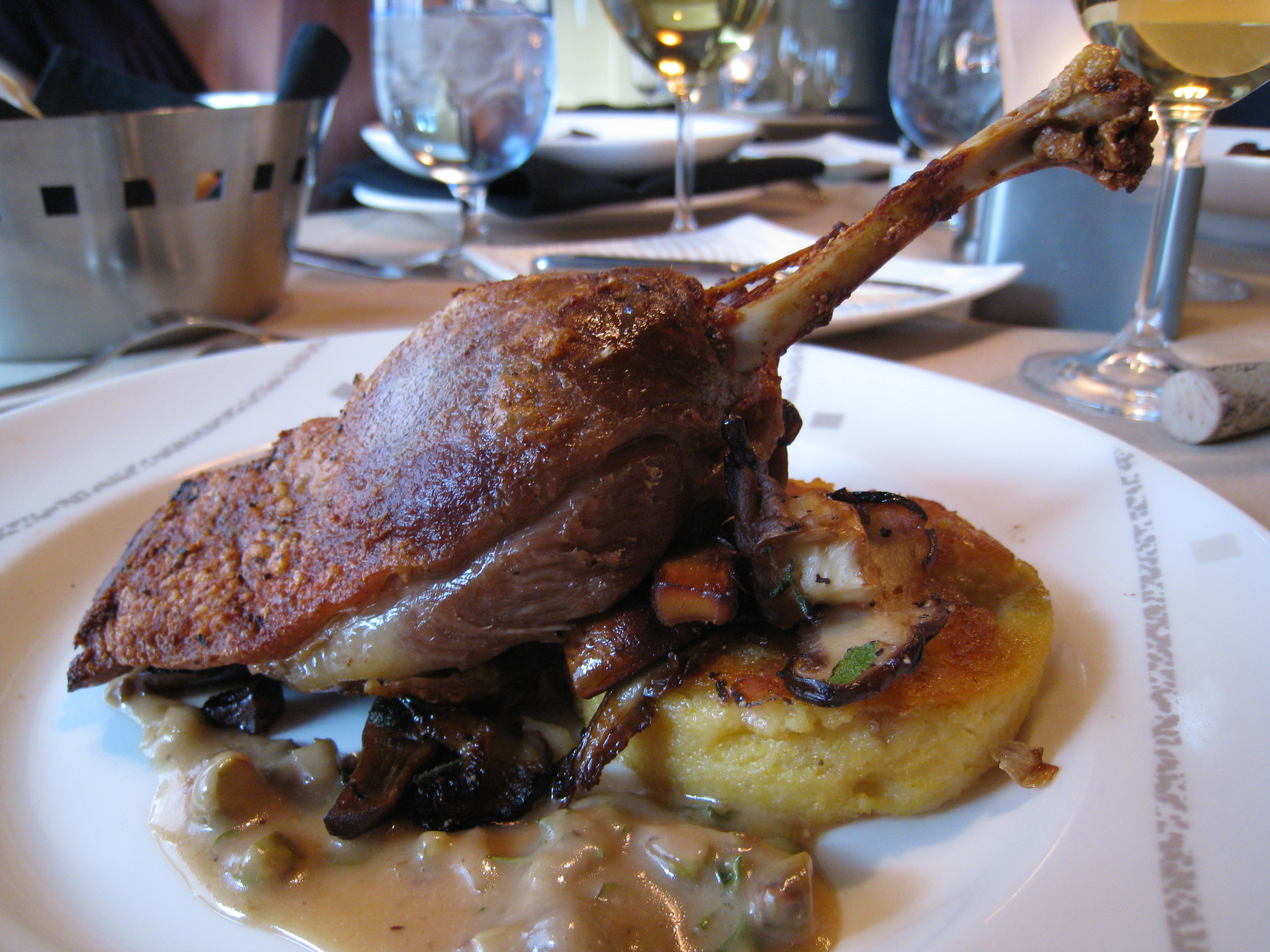
Duck confit

Confit (/kɒnfi/, French pronunciation: [kɔ̃fi]; Occitan: confisat) (from French 'to preserve') is a food that is cooked in fat as a method of preservation.

A confit is cooked in fat at a low temperature, typically 90 °C (200 °F) or less.

For meat, this method requires the meat to be salted. After salting and cooking in fat, confit can last for several months or years when sealed and stored in a cool, dark place. Confit is a specialty of southwestern France.

== Etymology ==
The word comes from French confire 'to preserve', which in turn comes from Latin conficere 'to do, to produce, to make, to prepare'. The French verb was first applied in medieval times to fruits cooked and preserved in sugar.

== Fruit confit ==
Fruit confit is candied fruit (whole fruit, or pieces thereof) preserved in sugar. The fruit must be fully infused with sugar to its core; larger fruit takes considerably longer than smaller ones to candy. Thus, while small fruit such as cherries are confits whole, it is quite rare to see whole large fruit, such as melon confits since the time and energy involved in producing large fruit confits makes them quite expensive.

== Meat confit ==
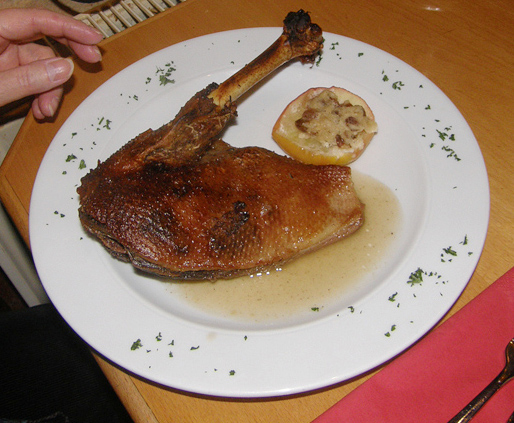
Duck leg confit

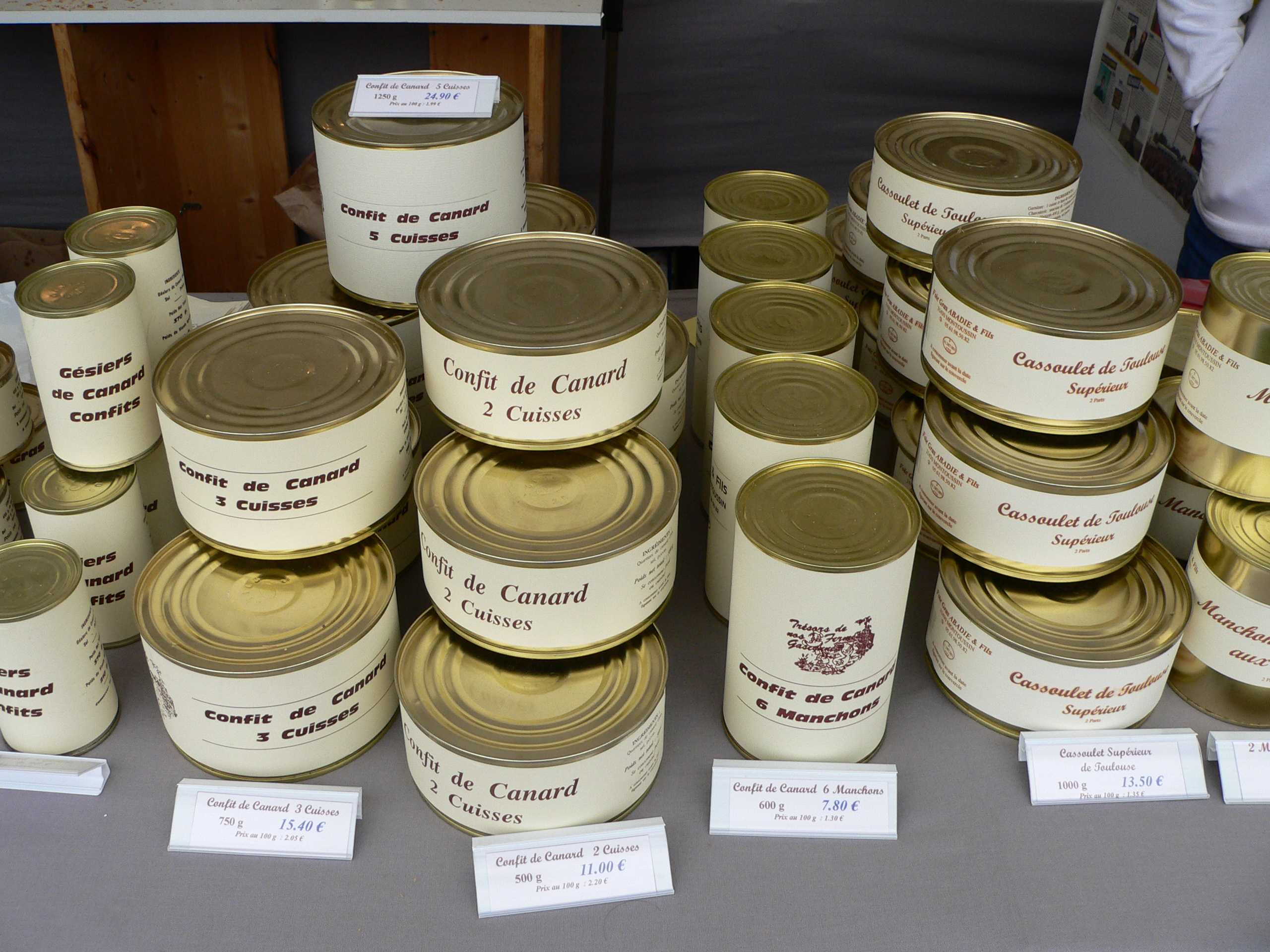
Canned duck confit and cassoulet

Confit of goose (confit d'oie) or duck (confit de canard) is usually prepared from the legs of the bird. The meat is salted, seasoned with herbs, and slowly cooked submerged in its own rendered fat at 85 °C (185 °F) or less. The meat is put in containers with its fat. Turkey and pork may be treated in the same manner. Meat confit is a specialty of the southwest of France (Toulouse, Dordogne, and other areas) and is used in dishes such as cassoulet. Confit preparations originated as a means of preserving meat before refrigeration and canning.

In restaurants, confit is usually served after further preparation. Whole confit leg is baked to crisp the skin or added to a casserole-type dish. Confit duck leg is used to make rillettes.

=== History ===
The traditional meat for confit includes waterfowl such as goose and duck, and pork. Duck gizzards are also prepared as confit.

Confit is common in regions of France where goose fat is used for cooking, rather than olive oil. Goose confit is associated with the Béarn and Basque regions with their specialties of cassoulet and garbure, made with confit and beans. Saintonge and Brantôme feature duck confit, often with potatoes and truffles.

Non-waterfowl meats are also treated to the confit process. The French refer only to duck and goose confits as true confits; other meats poached in duck or goose fat are considered en confit ("in confit"). For example, chicken cooked in goose fat is called poulet en confit. Pork is often confit and shredded to create rillettes.

== Condiment confit ==
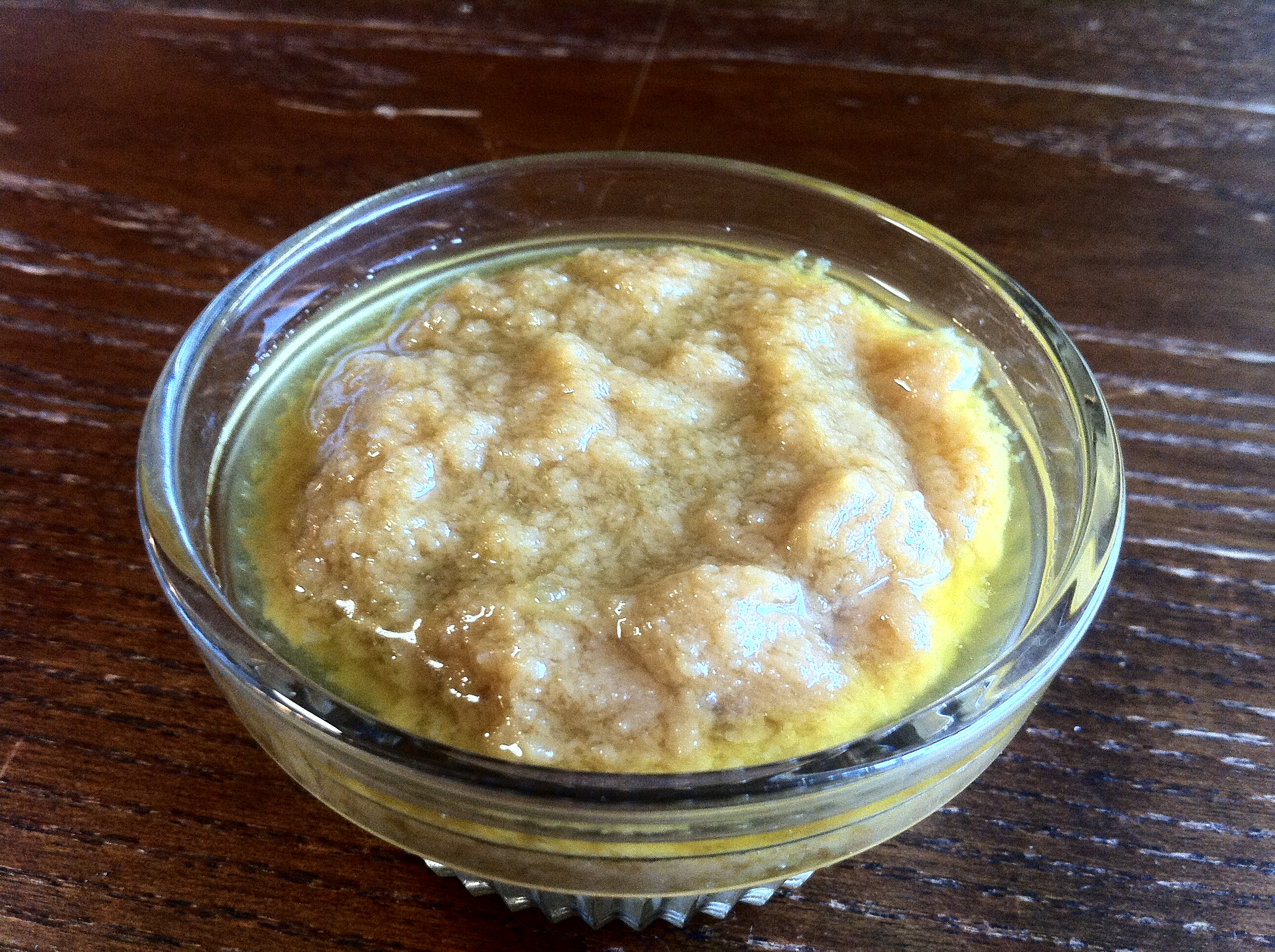
Blended garlic confit

Italian cooking uses several "condiment confits", such as onion confit, chili confit, and garlic confit.

== See also ==
- Maceration (food)
- Confit byaldi
- Fruit preserves
- Philippine adobo
- Potted meat, in which the fat is added after cooking
- Rendang
