= The Country Life =

1997 comedic novel by Rachel Cusk

- First edition (UK)
- Author: Rachel Cusk
- Language: English
- Genre: comedy, satire
- Publisher: Picador
- Publication date: June 20, 1997
- Publication place: United Kingdom
- Pages: 341 pp
- ISBN: 978-0-312-19848-0

The Country Life is a 1997 comedic novel by Rachel Cusk that draws on Stella Gibbons's Cold Comfort Farm and Charlotte Brontë's Jane Eyre. It won a 1998 Somerset Maugham Award.

== Description ==
The novel is a comedy that draws on both Cold Comfort Farm by Stella Gibbons and Jane Eyre by Charlotte Brontë. Stella Benson, the first-person narrator, abruptly abandons her life in London to take a position as carer to Martin, the wheelchair-using teenage son of the wealthy and eccentric Madden family, in a farm near a small village in rural Sussex. The novel details the many mishaps of her first week at the farm, and develops her relationships with Martin and his family, particularly his mother and handsome older brother. Stella appears to unearth secrets from the Madden family's past, though her reliability as a narrator is called into question, and her own reasons for fleeing London are explored.

== Reviews and critical studies ==
The novelist and academic Lisa Zeidner, in a review for the New York Times, writes that the novel "boasts pitch-perfect tonal control and humor of such sly subversion that the novel's premise transcends mere skit", adding that "The pleasure of 'The Country Life' derives from how skillfully Cusk draws us into 'the solipsistic cabbage patch' of Stella's consciousness."

Emma Hagestadt, in a review for The Independent, describes the novel as "rustic satire" where "it's sometimes hard to spot the joke", and writes: "Cusk's loaded sentences can be a joy or a stumbling-block, depending on your state of mind. Stella's every sensation is logged, and every nuance of every encounter calibrated, but it's the kind of analysis that can often make you gasp. Cusk is at her best at capturing the psychological make-up and mannerisms of particularly unpleasant people."

James Urquhart, in a review for the Financial Times, calls the novel "richly comic", writing that "Domestic strains are Cusk’s speciality, and the prickly intimacy that Stella develops with Martin is both charming and slightly edgy. Naïve introspection and formal language give her the unsettling presence of a Jane Austen heroine adrift in a Magnus Mills fable, one in which the social landscape is always slightly out of kilter."

Publishers Weekly calls the novel "a touching, hilarious narrative" and praises Cusk's "marvelous knack for revealing character in a few deft lines of dialogue". Kirkus Reviews describes it as "[w]itty, sharp, strangely good-natured".

Claire Lowdon criticises the novel in Areté, writing that "Too often readers are dazzled by difficulty, automatically assuming that if the prose is opaque, then it must be terrifically clever. But difficulty does not entail good writing, just as baroque contortions do not necessarily entail comedy. Cusk is guilty of both charges."

Two critical studies of the novel concentrate on its treatment of feminist themes. Nicolas Pierre Boileau draws parallels between Stella and the protagonists of Cusk's two earlier novels, Saving Agnes and The Temporary, stating that all three are "young, successful female characters that, for some reason, have failed to live up to society's expectations and end up as marginal, yet conventional women." He highlights the isolation caused by Stella's failure to identify with the novel's other female characters, writing that "Humiliation, disgust and the corporeality of womanhood are broached ... in a way that tends to attack most foundations of feminism by turning it into an ideology that is blind to the intimate, individual nature of woman's experience". Katja May takes an ecofeminist approach, considering that The Country Life uses "popular discourses about nature and women in order to convey late-twentieth-century women's struggle to live up to traditional ideals of femininity".

== Awards ==
The Country Life won a 1998 Somerset Maugham Award, and was selected as one of the Notable Books for Adults of 2000 by the American Library Association.
