= Potted shrimps =

Traditional English dish

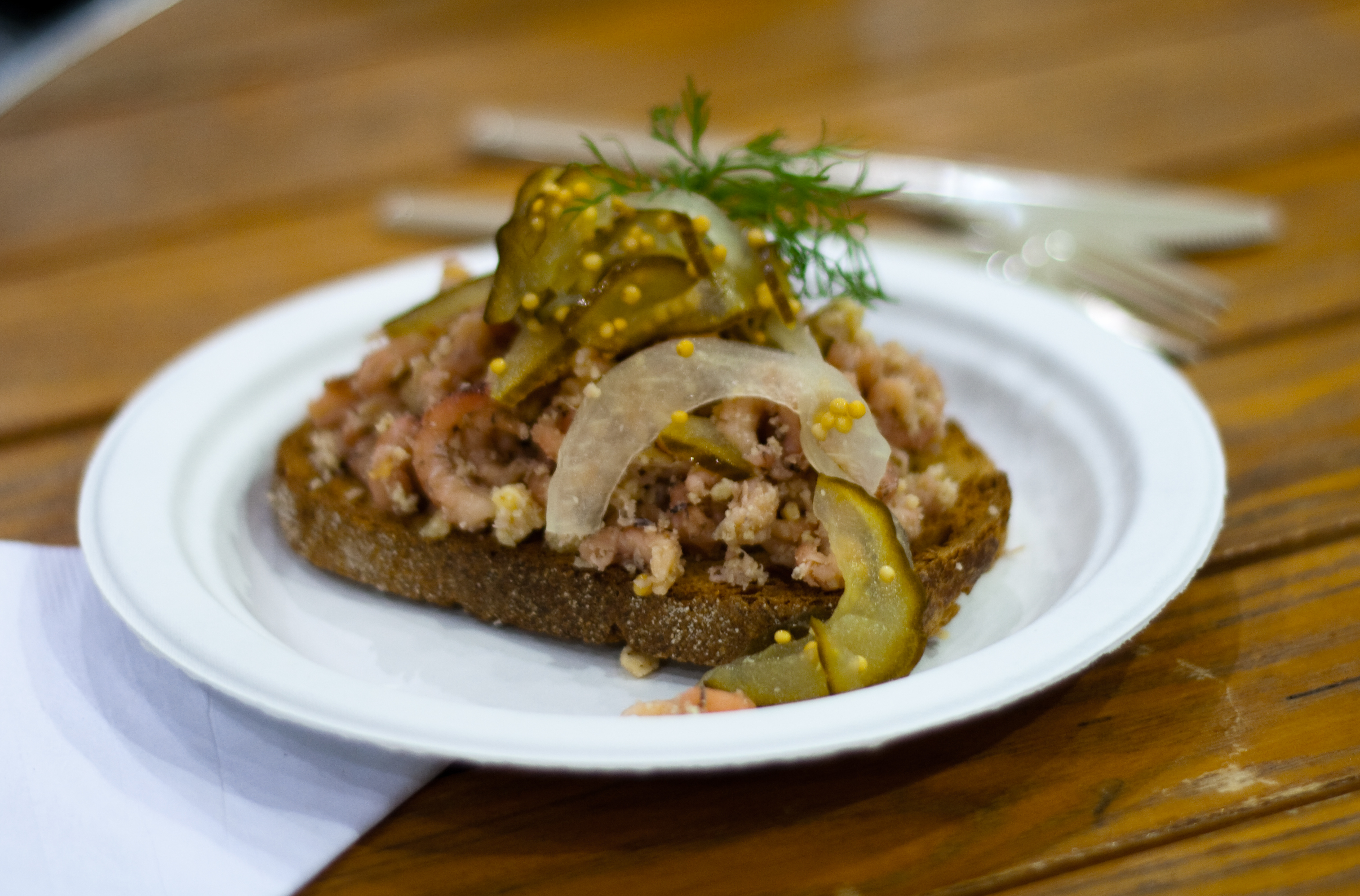
- Potted shrimps on toast with pickles
- Place of origin: England
- Region or state: Lancashire
- Main ingredients: brown shrimp, nutmeg

Potted shrimps is a traditional English dish made with brown shrimp flavored with nutmeg and baked in butter. The butter acts as a preservative, and cayenne pepper may also be used. Regarded as a delicacy, it is traditionally eaten with bread.

Potted shrimps was a favourite dish of Ian Fleming, who passed on his predilection to his fictional creation James Bond. Fleming reputedly used to eat the dish at Scott's Restaurant on Mount Street in London.

== See also ==
- Food preservation
- Hatchet Job of the Year
- Potted meat
- Shrimp paste
