= Stuart: A Life Backwards =

Biography by Alexander Masters

- Author: Alexander Masters
- Language: English
- Genre: Biography
- Publication date: 2005

Stuart: A Life Backwards is a biography by Alexander Masters concerning Masters’ friend Stuart Clive Shorter, formerly, at various times, a prisoner and a career criminal. It explores how a young boy, disabled from birth, became mentally unstable, criminal and violent, living homeless on the streets of Cambridge. As the title suggests, the book starts from Shorter's adult life, and works backwards to trace through his troubled childhood, examining the effects his family, schooling and disability had on his eventual state.

== Accolades ==
The book won the Whitbread Book of the Year Award in 2005 for biography, and the 2006 Hawthornden Prize. It won the 2005 Guardian First Book Award. Recently many secondary schools across the UK have included it in their higher education academic syllabus for English language.

== Adaptation ==
A television dramatisation with the same name, starring Tom Hardy as Shorter and Benedict Cumberbatch as Masters was co-produced by the BBC and HBO in 2007. Tom Hardy was nominated for a 2008 BAFTA for his portrayal of Stuart Shorter.

A stage production premiered in 2013 adapted by double BAFTA-winning writer Jack Thorne produced by HighTide Festival Theatre and the Crucible Theatre Sheffield. Perrier Award winner Will Adamsdale played Alexander Masters and Fraser Ayres played Stuart Shorter, and was nominated for Best Actor in The Stage Awards.

== Life of Stuart Shorter ==
Stuart Shorter (born Stuart Clive Turner on 19 September 1968 in Cambridge – died 6 July 2002 in Waterbeach, Cambridgeshire) was a homeless man and advocate whose life was chronicled by Alexander Masters in his book.

Shorter was born in a condemned cottage on the edge of Cambridge, the son of Andrew Turner (called Rex in the book and dramatisation), a gypsy and Sonia (Judith), (née Tierney), a barmaid. Sonia later remarried, to David Shorter [Paul]. Stuart had two brothers and one half-sister, Andrew [Gavvy], Kai [Marcus] and Zoe [Karen]: most noted in the novel are his older brother, Gavvy, and younger sister, Karen. Marcus is only mentioned briefly in the book. Shorter suffered from facioscapulohumeral muscular dystrophy, which he inherited from his father, and borderline personality disorder.

As a child, Shorter was sexually abused by his brother, and also by a babysitter, after which he was put into a children's home. Here, he was abused again by the paedophile Keith Laverack, who in 1997 was jailed for 18 years for various offences against children. During his adult life, Shorter was in and out of various homeless hostels, as well as spending much time in prison for a number of violent crimes. He also fathered one son, the Little'Un, who lives in Norwich.

In 1998, following a five-year jail sentence for armed robbery, Shorter was living in a subterranean multi-storey car park when he was rescued by two outreach workers, who found him a flat to live in. He subsequently became one of the first people to bring The Big Issue into Cambridge, and his work as an activist for the homeless began when he presented a short BBC2 documentary, Private Investigations, denouncing police plans to ban homeless people from the city centre.

In 1999, Shorter became a leading figure in the campaign to release Ruth Wyner and John Brock, the Director and Day Centre Manager of Wintercomfort for the Homeless, who had been sent to prison because some of the people they were looking after had been secretly trading drugs on the charity's premises. Shorter negotiated with police to organise marches and vigils, and arranged the campaign's most successful gesture, a three-day sleep-out of homeless people outside the Home Office in London, which ended in the release of the "Cambridge Two" after just six months.

On 6 July 2002, just outside his home village of Waterbeach, Stuart Shorter was hit by the 11.15pm London to King's Lynn train, and was killed instantly. He was 33 years old. As to the cause of his death, the jury returned an open verdict. Despite an overall lack of evidence that Shorter purposefully walked in front of the train, the coroners report stating that this was contrary to how his body was positioned at the time of death, there are hints that suggest Shorter may have intended to die. Shorter had a long history of attempted suicides and his sister Zoe once mentioned in an interview that Shorter informed her that were he ever to commit suicide he would make it appear accidental as he felt that the prospect of his mother losing both sons to suicide would be too much for her to bear.
