= The Lucky Ones (short story collection) =

2003 short story collection

- First edition cover
- Author: Rachel Cusk
- Publisher: Fourth Estate
- Publication date: April 7, 2003

The Lucky Ones is a 2003 story collection by British author Rachel Cusk. Billed as a novel, it consists of five stories mainly concerned with the subject of family relationships, about five different people who are loosely connected to each other.

== Contents ==
- "Confinement" concerns Kirsty, a young pregnant woman who is serving a life sentence after being wrongly convicted of arson and murder.
- "The Way You Do It" sees Martin, a male friend of one of Kirsty's legal representatives, spending a holiday in Switzerland with friends – and away from his young family for the first time
- In "The Sacrifices", an unnamed woman (the sister of another of the solicitor's friends) recalls her broken marriage during a visit to her childhood home.
- "Mrs Daley's Daughter" concerns Barbara Daley (the mother of another of the friends), who fails to recognise and understand her daughter's postnatal depression.
- And in the final story, "Matters of Life and Death", Vanessa (one of Barbara's neighbours) discovers that her husband has been having an affair and is preparing to leave her; while a chance meeting prompts her to take an interest in Kirsty's case.

== Reception ==
Reviewing the book for The Guardian, John Mullan, senior lecturer in English at University College London was positive about the collection, describing the connected stories as using "a technique of passing, sometimes accidental, connection, reminiscent of a Robert Altman film". Mullan adds, "The desolation is elegantly credible."
