= Adrian Clarke (photographer) =

English photographer

- Occupation: Photographer
- Known for: Social realism
- Spouse: Rachel Cusk (separated)
- Relatives: Albertine Clarke (Daughter)

Adrian Clarke is an English photographer. Originally trained and practising as a civil liberties lawyer, Clarke made the switch to photography in 2003.

His work is in a social realist style. His first major set of pictures was Framed, a series of pictures of subjects who had served long prison sentences for crimes they did not commit. Between 2004 and 2007, he worked in partnership with the County Durham Drug and Alcohol Action Team photographing a community of abusers of drugs and alcohol in the north east of England. The work was collected in a book, Gary's Friends, named after Gary Crooks, a reformed dealer who introduced him to friends and relatives. The work was published in September 2007 and was shown at the Durham Arts Festival in June 2008.

Clarke's most recent work is South Bank, a series of portraits of residents of the area between Middlesbrough and Redcar and continues the themes explored in his earlier work. The work was displayed at the Python Gallery in Middlesbrough in May and June 2009.

Clarke was married to the writer Rachel Cusk. While Cusk has written and spoken publicly about their marriage in The Guardian and on the BBC, Clarke has not spoken about their marital split.

== Footnotes and references ==
- Clarke, Adrian; Masters, Alexander (4 September 2007). Gary's Friends. The West Pier Press. ISBN 978-0-9555759-0-7.
