= Arlington Park (novel) =

Novel by Rachel Cusk

- First edition (publ. Faber & Faber)
- Author: Rachel Cusk
- Publisher: Faber and Faber
- Publication date: September 7, 2006
- ISBN: 978-0-571-23339-7

Arlington Park is a 2006 novel, the seventh book by English author Rachel Cusk.

It was shortlisted for the 2007 Orange Prize for Fiction.

== Plot ==
Focussing on a single day in an affluent English suburb, the book chronicles the lives of five middle-class married women, all of them mothers of young children. Going about their routines of child-rearing, work, shopping and socialising, they dwell of their feelings of frustration and disappointment, memories good and bad, aspirations and sometimes flashes of inspiration and hope. The five meet in the evening at a dinner party hosted by one of them.

== Characters ==
The five women are Juliet Randall, Amanda Clapp, Maisie Carrington, Stephanie Sykes, and Christine Lanham who hosts the dinner party. The Guardian noted a literary parallel, describing Christine as "a drolly jaundiced version of Virginia Woolf's Mrs Dalloway".
