= Rachel Cusk =

Canadian-British writer (born 1967)

Rachel Cusk FRSL
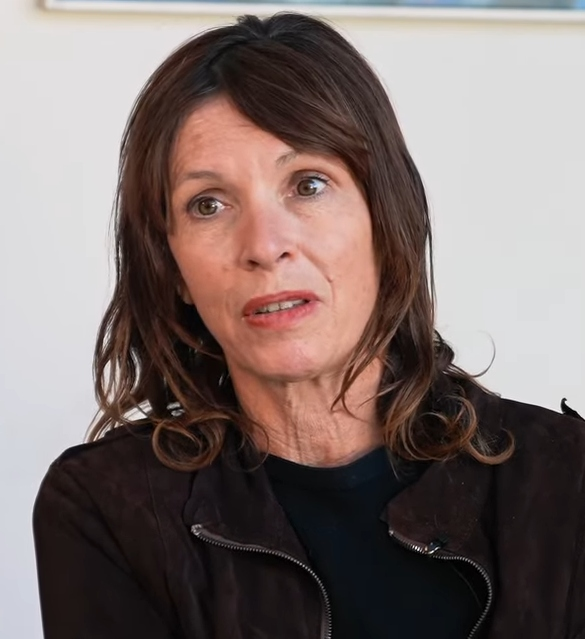
- Cusk in 2024
- Born: 8 February 1967 (age 59); Saskatoon, Saskatchewan, Canada
- Occupation: Author
- Writing career
- Language: English
- Notable works: Aftermath: On Marriage and Separation (2012); The Outline Trilogy: Outline (2014), Transit (2016) & Kudos (2018)

Rachel Cusk (born 8 February 1967) is an English novelist. She has published thirteen novels as well as memoirs and other works of non-fiction. Her work has received several awards, including the Whitbread First Novel Award and a Somerset Maugham Award, and been short- and longlisted for several others, including the Governor General's Award and the Booker Prize. Her work has explored motherhood, marriage, satire, as well as more experimental forms of narrative.

== Early life and education ==
Cusk was born in Saskatoon, Saskatchewan, Canada to English Catholic parents in 1967, the second of four children with an older sister and two younger brothers. As a baby, she was moved with her family to Los Angeles, where she lived until she was seven. In 1974, her parents returned with her to England settling in Bury St Edmunds, Suffolk. She attended St Mary's Convent in Cambridge. She read English at New College, Oxford.

== Career ==
=== Early works ===
Cusk's first novel, Saving Agnes, published in 1993, received the Whitbread First Novel Award. Its themes of femininity and social satire remained central to her work over the next decade. She followed this in 1995 with The Temporary, then with 1997's The Country Life, a comedic novel inspired by Stella Gibbons's Cold Comfort Farm and Charlotte Brontë's Jane Eyre. It won a 1998 Somerset Maugham Award. In 2003 she published The Lucky Ones, a novel of linked stories about five different people, loosely connected to each other. That same year, Cusk was nominated by Granta magazine as one of 20 'Best of Young British Novelists'. Her seventh novel, Arlington Park, was shortlisted for the 2007 Orange Prize for Fiction. In 2009, she taught creative writing at Kingston University.

=== Memoirs ===
In responding to the formal problems of the novel representing female experience, she began to work in non-fiction: A Life's Work, a memoir of motherhood published in 2001, and 2012's Aftermath, which chronicled her marriage to and divorce from her second husband, the photographer Adrian Clarke.

=== Trilogy and later works ===
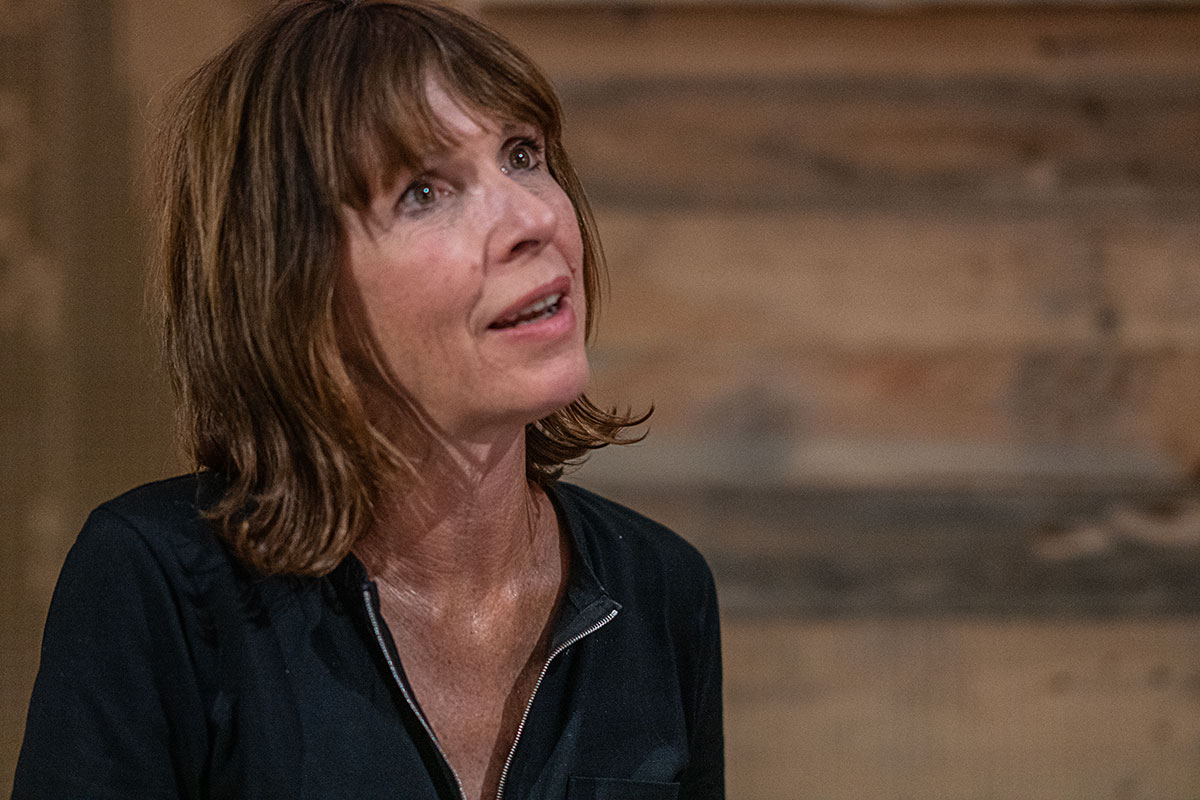
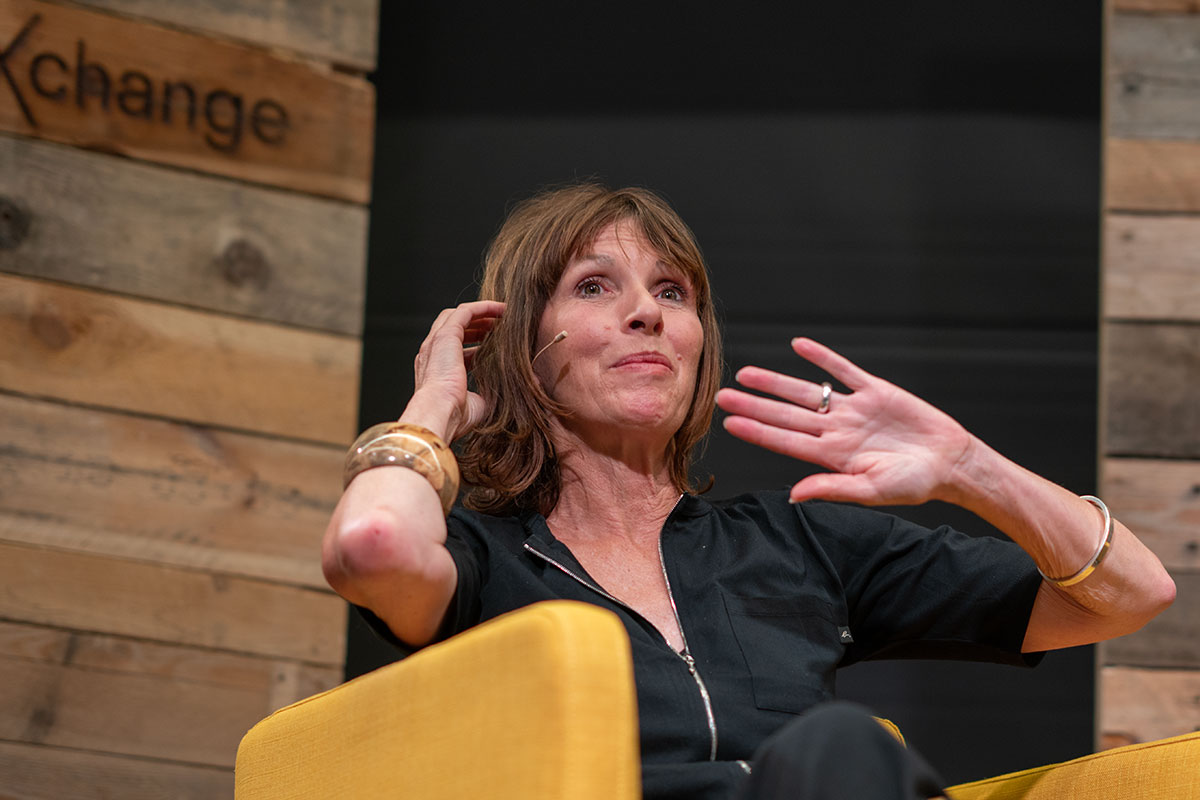
LiteratureXchange Festival in Aarhus (Denmark 2025)

After a long period of consideration, Cusk began working in a new form that represented personal experience while avoiding the politics of subjectivity and literalism and remaining free from narrative convention. That project became a trilogy of "autobiographical novels": Outline, Transit, and Kudos. The books largely consist of an unnamed narrator chronicling the conversations she has with others, as she goes about her life as a writer.

Judith Thurman in The New Yorker wrote: "Many experimental writers have rejected the mechanics of storytelling, but Cusk has found a way to do so without sacrificing its tension." Outline was one of The New York Times's top 5 novels of 2015. Reviewing Outline in The New York Times, Heidi Julavits wrote: "While the narrator is rarely alone, reading Outline mimics the sensation of being underwater, of being separated from other people by a substance denser than air. But there is nothing blurry or muted about Cusk's literary vision or her prose: Spend much time with this novel and you'll become convinced she is one of the smartest writers alive."

Reviewing Cusk's novel Transit, critic Helen Dunmore writing for The Guardian commended Cusk's "brilliant, insightful prose", adding, "Cusk is now working on a level that makes it very surprising that she has not yet won a major literary prize". In The New York Times review of Transit, Dwight Garner said the novel offers "transcendental reflections", and that he was waiting more eagerly for Kudos, the last novel of Rachel Cusk's trilogy, than for that of Karl Ove Knausgaard's My Struggle series.

Reviews of Kudos, the last novel of Cusk's trilogy, were largely positive. Writing for The New Yorker, Katy Waldman called it "a book about failure that is not, in itself, a failure. In fact, it is a breathtaking success."

In 2015, the Almeida theatre commissioned and originally produced Cusk's adaption of Medea as Medea - Euripides, A New Version. In Cusk's adaptation, Medea does not murder her children. Reviewing Medea, the Financial Times commented: "Rachel Cusk is known as an unsparing writer in the territory of marital break-up".

Cusk's novel Second Place was published in 2021. It is inspired by the memoirs of Mabel Dodge Luhan, who hosted D.H. Lawrence at her property at the Taos art colony in New Mexico, in 1924. In this work, Cusk's experimentation with the form of the novel continued. Andrew Schenker, writing in the Los Angeles Review of Books, wrote: "If the Outline trilogy had seemed to push beyond the novel while still working within the form, then Second Place suggests that Cusk may have outgrown the genre entirely." Cleveland Review of Books reviewed the book, saying that "the narratorial absence is part of what compels one through the novels, for it acts like a filter, distilling all other people's tales down to their most philosophically bare, their most ethically ambiguous, their most painfully isolated." Blandine Longre's French translation was awarded the 2022 Prix Femina étranger.

Life of M, Cusk's thirteenth novel, was published in 2026. Reviews were mixed, with critics noting the similarity of the main character, M, to Natalie Portman, leading The New York Times Magazine's Parul Sehgal to characterise the novel as "unlikely tabloid fodder". Meanwhile, a BBC article described the novel as a "literary assassination" of the actress. Reviewers seemed to agree on the novel's "rarefied, cosmopolitan, self-serious" tone and Cusk's "precision" in pinpointing the emotional states of her characters.

== Honours and reception ==
The 13th episode of Chanel's rendez-vous littéraire celebrated how Cusk's work speaks to the obstacles women face in their creative expression. That event was hosted by Monegasque philosopher Charlotte Casiraghi and guest hosted by Naomi Campbell at the 7L bookstore in Paris. Campbell read aloud from Cusk's work and then the panel discussed the emotional landscape of the maternal experience. Cusk was credited for filling what was considered a void in the literature about that emotional landscape.

== Personal life ==
After a brief first marriage to a banker, Cusk was married to photographer Adrian Clarke, with whom she has two daughters. The couple separated in 2011. Their divorce, which was acrimonious, became a major topic in Cusk's writings. She subsequently revealed, "I had hated my husband's unwaged domesticity just as much as I had hated my mother's; and he, like her, had claimed to be content with his lot." Her husband's willingness to give up the traditional male role of wage-earner was not, for Cusk, "a manifestation of equality but of dependence" and she felt "beneath the reconfigured surface of things, the tension of the old orthodoxies."

Cusk is currently married to retail consultant and artist Siemon Scamell-Katz. In 2021, the couple moved from residences in London and Norfolk to Paris, a protest in part against the withdrawal of the United Kingdom from the European Union.

== Awards and honours ==
=== Awards won ===
- 1993 – Whitbread First Novel Award for Saving Agnes.
- 1998 – Somerset Maugham Award for The Country Life.
- 2022 – Prix Femina étranger for Blandine Longre's French translation of Second Place.
- 2024 – Goldsmiths Prize for Parade.
- 2024 – Premio Malaparte.

=== Shortlists ===
- 2003 – Whitbread Novel Award for The Lucky Ones.
- 2007 – Orange Prize for Fiction for Arlington Park.
- 2014 – Goldsmiths Prize for Outline.
- 2015 – Baileys Women's Prize for Fiction for Outline.
- 2015 – Folio Prize for Outline.
- 2015 – Governor General's Award for English-language fiction for Outline.
- 2015 – Scotiabank Giller Prize for Outline.
- 2016 – Goldsmiths Prize for Transit.
- 2017 – Scotiabank Giller Prize for Transit.
- 2018 – Goldsmiths Prize for Kudos.
- 2021 – Governor General's Award for English-language fiction for Second Place.

=== Longlists ===
- 2005 – Man Booker Prize for In the Fold.
- 2021 – Booker Prize for Second Place.

=== Honours ===
- 2003 – Named one of Granta's 20 Best of Young British Novelists.
- 2012 – Fellow of the Royal Society of Literature.

== Bibliography ==
Novels

- Saving Agnes (1993)
- The Temporary (1995)
- The Country Life (1997)
- The Lucky Ones (2003)
- In the Fold (2005)
- Arlington Park (2006)
- The Bradshaw Variations (2009)
- The Outline Trilogy
  1. Outline (2014)
  2. Transit (2016)
  3. Kudos (2018)
- Second Place (2021)
- Parade (2024)
- Life of M (2026)

Non-fiction

- A Life's Work: On Becoming a Mother (2001)
- The Last Supper: A Summer in Italy (2009)
- Aftermath: On Marriage and Separation (2012)
- Coventry: Essays (2019)
- Quarry (2022)
- (with Chris Kontos) Marble in Metamorphosis (2022)

Theatre

- Medea, Euripides – A new Version, 2015, Commissioned by and originally produced at the Almeida theatre in London, UK.

Short stories

- "After Caravaggio's Sacrifice of Isaac", Granta, 2003
- "The Stuntman", The New Yorker, 2023
- "Project", The New Yorker, 2025
