= Michael-Christopher Koji Fox =

American translator and author

- Fox in 2016
- Born: Oregon, U.S.
- Occupations: Translator, writer
- Years active: 2002–present
- Notable work: Final Fantasy XIV, The Primals

Michael-Christopher Koji Fox, also known as Koji Fox, is an American video game localizer, translator and lyricist. He is best known for his localization work on Final Fantasy XIV and Final Fantasy XVI, as well as his role as lead singer for The Primals, the official Final Fantasy XIV rock band. He joined Square Enix in 2003 to work on Final Fantasy XI.

== Biography ==
Fox was born in Oregon. He was inspired to study Japanese by From Oregon with Love, a Japanese drama that aired locally when he was a child, as well as a desire to play imported games earlier than his friends, including The Legend of Zelda: Ocarina of Time. After high school, he spent time in Japan as a foreign exchange student where he gained a desire to become a teacher. He received a teaching license from Hokkaido University of Education and taught English and homeroom at a junior high school. In his personal time, Fox was an avid player of Final Fantasy XI (2002), joining during the beta test. When he saw a recruitment ad for a localization position at Square, he decided to apply on a whim and was placed on the Final Fantasy XI localization team under Richard Honeywood. His first day was on April 1, 2003, the day of the merger between Square and Enix. During the development for the North American release of the game, he worked on text from the Windurst area, including Shantotto's rhyming dialogue, as well as phrases for the auto-translation feature. He was praised for starting the trend of playful item descriptions to the English version of the game. Fox served as a drummer for the Star Onions, the Final Fantasy XI band, for a number of in-person fan events. He also worked on lyrics and lyric translation and is credited on "Distant Worlds", the ending theme for Chains of Promathia. During breaks between work on Final Fantasy XI, he worked on translations for Dirge of Cerberus: Final Fantasy VII and Code Age Commanders, the latter of which the script was finished before the English release was cancelled.

Fox was a translation director for the original 2010 release of Final Fantasy XIV, which was widely panned for its software bugs and poor gameplay. He was retained in the role after Naoki Yoshida took over as producer and director for subsequent releases. He described the rapid development of Final Fantasy XIV: A Realm Reborn (2013) as a "weird euphoria" as the team was unsure if the new game would meet players' expectations. The story of the original game was one of the few aspects that garnered praise, so the story and localization team continued the same high fantasy tone, inspired in part by A Song of Ice and Fire, for the revamped story. In contrast to the speech patterns based on the fantasy races of Final Fantasy XI, Fox focused the differences in dialect on characters' region of origin for this game. For the first expansion, Heavensward, he incorporated an unused fictional language for the dragons which he had created during the development of the 2010 release.

Due to the ongoing nature of live service games, the localization teams for Final Fantasy XI and Final Fantasy XIV work collaboratively with the development team on the story, lore, and world of the games to ensure that patches are translated in time. For certain aspects like item and attack names, Fox and his team would contribute text in English, French, or German and translate it back into Japanese for those versions of the games. For Final Fantasy XVI (2023), the script was written in Japanese but recorded and motion captured first in English. Fox, who served as localization director, saw this as an opportunity for ensemble recording, in which multiple cast members would record their lines together in the same room and benefit from playing off each others' acting. This allowed more opportunities for ad-libbing and exploring the relationships between characters. The adjustments made for the English script were then integrated into the final Japanese script. He also arranged for a character who provides recaps of the game's story to be sung in the style of a bard. Another goal of the localization was to preserve the historical fantasy tone. To this end, he tried to avoid any vocabulary or turns of phrase invented after the 18th century. He further reinforced the history of the world by assigning different British accents to each nation to emulate how language evolves and diverges naturally even within one language.

One of Fox's major responsibilities is the lore and worldbuilding for the English language versions of the games he works on and ensuring consistency across the work. He pushed for a hub for players to discuss the lore on the official forums for Final Fantasy XIV and uses it to post articles that expand on the game's world. He worked with Banri Oda, one of the main writers, to translate the Encyclopædia Eorzea books, which document the lore of Final Fantasy XIV in detail. In Final Fantasy XVI, his approach was to integrate the lore throughout the fabric of the game, including item descriptions, side quests, and ambient dialogue, rather than solely through explicit exposition. He took inspiration from Alex Pheby's Cities of the Weft trilogy to write the in-game "Active Time Lore" entries. For the lore book, Fox served as lead writer to transform creative director Kazutoyo Maehiro's notes into Logos, an encyclopedia written from the perspective of Harpocrates, a historian within the game. He invited voice actors like Ben Starr to write letters and journal entries based on their characters. He also invited Pheby, a fan of Final Fantasy, to contribute as well. The book was written first in English and translated for the Japanese release.

Fox has contributed lyrics to many songs in Final Fantasy XIV and is the lead vocalist and rapper for The Primals, the official band for the game. Sound director Masayoshi Soken first asked him to write lyrics for "Good King Moggle Mog XII" and "Under the Weight" and, due to a tight deadline during the development of A Realm Reborn, Fox ended up singing and rapping for the tracks as well. For the 2014 Final Fantasy XIV Fan Festival, Soken got him to join The Primals because of his familiarity with the lyrics on the setlist. He has performed at Fan Festival events ever since and toured with The Primals across Japan, including shows at Makuhari Messe, Yokohama Arena, and Nippon Budokan. He performed with The Primals at Download Festival at Leicestershire, England in 2026. In addition, he works as an interpreter for Naoki Yoshida in media appearances and interviews.

== Works ==
=== Video games ===
Title	Year (Note: Sorted by year of English language release)	Platform(s)	Notes (Note: Credited as translator or localization specialist unless noted)	Ref.
Final Fantasy XI	2003	Windows, PlayStation 2, Xbox 360		
Dirge of Cerberus: Final Fantasy VII	2006	PlayStation 2		
Mario Hoops 3-on-3	2006	Nintendo DS	Voices	
Final Fantasy Tactics: The War of the Lions	2007	PlayStation Portable		
Crisis Core: Final Fantasy VII	2008	PlayStation Portable		
The World Ends With You	2008	Nintendo DS		
Final Fantasy Crystal Chronicles: My Life as a King	2008	Wii		
Crystal Defenders	2009	Wii		
Final Fantasy XIV	2010	Windows	Translation direction, English localization	
Secret of Mana	2010	iOS	English supervisor	
Lord of Arcana	2011	PlayStation Portable	Narrator	
Moon Diver	2011	PlayStation 3		
Demons' Score	2012	iOS, Android		
Chaos Rings	2012	iOS, Android		
Chaos Rings Omega	2012	iOS, Android		
Final Fantasy Dimensions	2012	iOS, Android		
Final Fantasy XIV: A Realm Reborn	2013	Windows, PlayStation 3, PlayStation 4	Translation direction, English localization, lyrics	
Final Fantasy XIV: Heavensward	2015	Windows, macOS, PlayStation 3, PlayStation 4	Translation direction, English localization, lyrics	
Adventures of Mana	2016	iOS, Android, PlayStation Vita		
NieR: Automata	2017	Windows, PlayStation 4		
Final Fantasy XIV: Stormblood	2017	Windows, macOS, PlayStation 4	Translation direction, English localization, lyrics	
Final Fantasy XIV: Shadowbringers	2019	Windows, macOS, PlayStation 4	Translation direction, English localization, lyrics	
Actraiser Renaissance	2021	Windows, iOS, Android, Switch, PlayStation 4	Localization consultant	
Final Fantasy XIV: Endwalker	2021	Windows, macOS, PlayStation 4, PlayStation 5	Translation direction, English localization, lyrics	
Final Fantasy XVI	2023	Windows, PlayStation 5, Xbox Series	Localization director, lyrics	
Foamstars	2024	PlayStation 4, PlayStation 5	Lyrics, vocals	
Final Fantasy XIV: Dawntrail	2024	Windows, macOS, PlayStation 4, PlayStation 5, Xbox Series	Localization supervisor, lyrics	

=== Discography ===
Title	Year	Notes	Ref.
Sanctuary: Final Fantasy XI: Music From The Other Side Of Vana'diel	2009	Drums	
Final Fantasy XIV: From Astral to Umbral - Band & Piano Arrangement Album	2014	Lyrics, vocals	
Final Fantasy XIV: Duality ~Arrangement Album~	2016	Lyrics, vocals	
Untempered: Final Fantasy XIV Primal Battle Themes	2017	Lyrics, vocals	
The Primals	2018	Lyrics, vocals	
The Primals: Zepp Tour 2018 -Trial By Shadow-	2018	Lyrics, vocals	
Journeys: Final Fantasy XIV Arrangement Album	2019	Lyrics, vocals	
The Primals - Out of the Shadows	2020	Lyrics, vocals	
Pulse: Final Fantasy XIV Remix Album	2020	Lyrics, vocals	
Scions & Sinners Final Fantasy XIV ~Arrangement Album~	2021	Lyrics, vocals	
The Primals: Beyond the Shadow	2022	Lyrics, vocals	
The Primals: Live in Japan - Beyond the Shadow	2022	Lyrics, vocals	
Forge Ahead: Final Fantasy XIV ~Arrangement Album~	2023	Lyrics, vocals	
The Primals: Riding Home	2024	Lyrics, vocals	
And Back Again: Live Performances from the FINAL FANTASY XIV Fan Festival 2024	2024	Lyrics, vocals	
The Primals: Live in Japan - Darkest Before Dawn	2025	Lyrics, vocals	
The Primals: Dark Decades	2025	Lyrics, vocals	
The Primals: Dark Decades - Tour BUDOKAN	2026	Lyrics, vocals	
The Primals: Back in the Ring	2026	Lyrics, vocals	

=== Books ===
Title	Year	Notes	Ref.
Encyclopædia Eorzea	2016		
Encyclopædia Eorzea Volume II	2018		
Encyclopædia Eorzea Volume III	2023		
Logos: The World of Final Fantasy XVI	2026		

== See also ==
- Localization of Square Enix video games
