= Richard Honeywood =

Australian video game localization director

- Education: University of Sydney
- Occupation: Translator
- Years active: 1993–present
- Notable work: Xenogears, Final Fantasy XI, Dragon Quest

Richard Mark Honeywood is an Australian video game localization director and professional English/Japanese translator. He grew up in Australia and moved to Japan after graduating with degrees in computer science and Japanese from the University of Sydney. Honeywood initially worked for several Japanese video game developers as a programmer, but transitioned to localization after joining Square in 1997. He is credited with founding the company's localization department, which has been praised for its high-quality translations. During his tenure at Square (later Square Enix), Honeywood expanded the team's role from text translation to becoming a partner of the development team, creating localized text and graphics and ensuring that the video game code supported multiple languages easily. In 2007, Honeywood left Square Enix for Blizzard Entertainment, where he served as the global localization manager for World of Warcraft until November 2010. He then moved to be the translation director for Level-5.

== Biography ==
Honeywood grew up in Australia and showed an early interest in computers, programming his own games on Commodore 64 and VIC-20. He spent time in Japan as a high school foreign exchange student in Gifu. He taught himself basic Japanese by looking up characters he did not know from Dragon Quest II and shōnen manga in a dictionary. He earned degrees in computer science and Japanese at University of Sydney and spent his fourth year at its sister school, Hosei University. He began his career as a game programmer at Rise Corporation, a subsidiary of Seibu Kaihatsu, working on arcade games and the PlayStation port of Raiden called The Raiden Project (1995). Honeywood and some members of this development team left Rise to form Digital Eden, a new company that worked on a number of Nintendo 64DD games in collaboration with HAL Laboratory. When it became clear that the 64DD's protracted development would render their efforts meaningless, Digital Eden agreed to disband without releasing a single game. Satoru Iwata, then-president of HAL Laboratory, personally offered Honeywood the opportunity to work on an early Pokémon game but he declined, instead joining Square in 1997.

Originally, he was to work as a programmer on Final Fantasy VII under Ken Narita. However, the impressive sales of Final Fantasy VII in Western markets prompted Square to look into improving the quality of its translated products—Final Fantasy VII was widely criticized for its rushed translation, which had been handled entirely by Michael Baskett, the company's only in-house translator at the time. Compounding this critical staff shortage, text in the game could only be input in Shift JIS, a standard Japanese character encoding format, which was incompatible with spelling and grammar correction software. Honeywood joined Aiko Ito, who had worked with Ted Woolsey on previous games, as localization producers to recruit for a dedicated localization team within the company, which later included Alexander O. Smith. This team established best practices with respect to code preservation—localization efforts for Chocobo no Fushigi na Dungeon and Tobal 2 were halted at the gate when a complete copy of the source code could not be pieced together from the disbanded development team's computers. For Final Fantasy VIII (1999), Honeywood had written a text parser that would automatically convert text from English ASCII to the Shift JIS format required by the game engine's compiler, streamlining the translation process dramatically.

Honeywood described Xenogears (1998), his first translation project at Square and the first to be handled internally by the company, as "pure hell", owing to its complex and controversial subject matter. This difficult experience catalyzed many of the changes to the company's approach to localization, moving translators' workspaces closer to the original development teams, improving communication with them, and introducing full-time editors. Another key change was adding a familiarization and glossary creation period to the schedule, in which the team develops a consistent style and characterization guide for the project. For Honeywood, a good localization takes into account the cultural differences between Japan and western territories. This sometimes involves rewriting dialogue or altering graphics, animations, and sounds. For instance, in Chocobo Racing (1999), visual references to the Japanese folk heroes Momotarō and Kiji were changed to depict Hansel and Gretel, since the game was designed mainly for children, and Hansel and Gretel are better known in the west than Momotarō and Kiji. According to Honeywood, trying to explain to the original development teams why some changes are needed can range from "frustrating to downright hilarious". Generally, older development teams trust the translators with making changes while newer teams can be more reluctant, though they usually build up trust gradually.

During the development of Final Fantasy IX (2000), Honeywood's team had expanded to allow translation from Japanese directly to French, Italian, German, and Spanish without English as an intermediate. He also convinced the planning team to switch to ASCII characters. It was the last main Final Fantasy title in which translation began after the game was finished. Starting with Final Fantasy X (2001), the localization team would get involved much earlier, collaborating to create the game script. As the first main series title to feature voice acting, the team faced problems in both making the dialogue more compatible with an English-speaking audience and lip-synching it to match the in-game characters, whose lip movements were matched to the original Japanese dialogue. Honeywood spent four years working as localization director of Final Fantasy XI (2003), translating new content concurrently with the Japanese version. For this title, he was responsible for the auto-translation feature, which allows Japanese- and English-speaking players of the game to communicate quickly. He also established naming conventions for the playable races and coded an automated name generator for new players. He recruited Michael-Christopher Koji Fox to work on the game. After Square merged with Enix to become Square Enix, he was tasked with managing localization for the Dragon Quest series. In order to differentiate the series from Final Fantasy, Honeywood decided to localize Dragon Quest VIII: Journey of the Cursed King (2005) and future titles in the series in British English. As part of this work, he wrote a comprehensive style guide to standardize names across the entire series, which has been maintained and updated by other teams since.

He moved to Blizzard Entertainment in 2007, serving as global localization manager for World of Warcraft from 2007 to 2010. He is the localization director for Level-5 as of 2011. For Ni no Kuni: Wrath of the White Witch (2013), Honeywood adapted the different Japanese accents of the original script into various British accents. He pointed to a stand-up comedy routine midway through the game as a particular challenge for that project.

== Works ==
Title	Year (Note: Sorted by year of English language release)	Platform(s)	Notes (Note: Credited as translator or localization specialist unless noted)	Ref.
Raiden II	1993	Arcade, PlayStation	Programming	
Viper Phase 1	1995	Arcade	Programming	
Battle Balls	1995	Arcade, PlayStation	Programming	
The Raiden Project	1995	PlayStation	Demo programming	
SaGa Frontier	1998	PlayStation		
Einhänder	1998	PlayStation		
Parasite Eve	1998	PlayStation	Special Thanks	
Xenogears	1998	PlayStation		
Ehrgeiz	1999	PlayStation	Special Thanks	
Chocobo Racing	1999	PlayStation		
Final Fantasy VIII	1999	PlayStation		
Chrono Cross	2000	PlayStation		
Final Fantasy IX	2000	PlayStation		
The Bouncer	2001	PlayStation 2		
Final Fantasy X	2001	PlayStation 2		
Final Fantasy XI	2003	PC, PlayStation 2, Xbox 360		
Sword of Mana	2003	Game Boy Advance		
Final Fantasy Crystal Chronicles	2004	Nintendo GameCube		
Dragon Quest VIII: Journey of the Cursed King	2005	PlayStation 2		
Dawn of Mana	2007	PlayStation 2		
Dragon Quest Monsters: Joker	2007	Nintendo DS		
Dragon Quest Swords: The Masked Queen and the Tower of Mirrors	2008	Wii		
Dragon Quest IV: Chapters of the Chosen	2008	Nintendo DS		
World of Warcraft: Wrath of the Lich King	2008	PC		
StarCraft II: Wings of Liberty	2010	PC		
World of Warcraft: Cataclysm	2010	PC		
Dragon Quest VI: Realms of Revelation	2011	Nintendo DS	Special Thanks	
Inazuma Eleven Strikers	2012	Wii		
Crimson Shroud	2012	Nintendo 3DS	Special Thanks	
Ni no Kuni: Wrath of the White Witch	2013	PlayStation 3		
Layton Brothers: Mystery Room	2013	iOS		
Layton's Mystery Journey: Katrielle and the Millionaires' Conspiracy	2017	iOS, Android, Nintendo 3DS		
Ni no Kuni II: Revenant Kingdom	2018	PlayStation 4, Microsoft Windows		
Snack World: The Dungeon Crawl – Gold	2020	Nintendo Switch	English localization	

== See also ==
- Localization of Square Enix video games
- Alexander O. Smith – Honeywood's protégé at Square and Square Enix
