= Vivisector =

Vivisector may refer to:

- one who engages in vivisection
- Vivisector (Marvel Comics), a comic book superhero
- The Vivisector, a novel by Patrick White
- The Vivisectors, a novel by Missouri Williams
- Vivisector: Beast Within, a first-person shooter video game
