= Kevin Davey =

British author

Kevin Davey is a British author of experimental fiction. His 2017 debut novel, Playing Possum, was longlisted for the Queen Mary Small Press Fiction Prize (then known as the Republic of Consciousness Prize) and shortlisted for the Goldsmiths Prize. His 2025 Novel, Toothpull of St Dunstan, was also longlisted for the Queen Mary Small Press Fiction Prize. He is also known as a writer and editor on cultural studies, politics, and history.

== Education ==
Kevin Davey was educated at Ashdon County Primary School, Newport Grammar School, Oadby Community College, Charles Keane College in Leicester, and the University of Kent in Canterbury.

== Career ==
Davey was the chair of the Socialist Society and the Socialist Conference in the mid-1980s, a member of the Charter 88 team, and a contributor to Tribune, the New Statesman, Liber, Red Pepper, and business publications before becoming editor of New Times (1999-2000). During that period he also worked on books by Stuart Hall, Eric Hobsbawm, and Raymond Williams as an editor for Verso.

After working in higher and further education, including a senior management role at Hackney Community College, Davey became the director of innovation, investment and incubation (D3I) at the Innovatory in Shoreditch from 1999 to 2012. Since that date he has been a consultant and business analyst for tech start-ups, investors and grant givers, social enterprises, shared workspace providers and charities across the UK. His research into seventeenth-century Quaker history in and around Saffron Walden led to a British Association for Local History award in 2018.

== Writing ==
Davey's early writings were in the field of cultural studies and politics. As a member of the Signs of the Times group in the 1990s, he contributed "The Impermanence of New Labour" to The Blair Agenda (Lawrence and Wishart, 1996) and "Waking up to New Times" to The Moderniser's Dilemma (Lawrence and Wishart, 1996), both edited by Mark Perryman. He contributed "Herbert Read and Englishness" to Herbert Read Reassessed, edited by David Goodway (Liverpool University Press, 1998), and "No Longer 'Ourselves Alone' in Northern Ireland" to British Cultural Studies, edited by David Morley and Kevin Robins (Oxford University Press, 2001).

He is the author of English Imaginaries: Anglo-British Approaches to Modernity (1999), which brings together studies of Nancy Cunard, J B Priestley, Pete Townshend, Vivienne Westwood, David Dabydeen and Mark Wallinger. With Paul Anderson, he co-authored Moscow Gold (2013), a history of the relations between the Soviet Union and the British left.

His first literary fiction, Playing Possum (2017), is an intertextual mystery placing T. S. Eliot in Whitstable in the 1920s. It was shortlisted for the Goldsmiths Prize and longlisted for the Queen Mary Small Press Fiction Prize (then known as the Republic of Consciousness Prize.

This was followed by Radio Joan (2021), a novel exploring the relationship between wireless and fascism, through interviews with a former lover of Lord Haw Haw and her three radio sets. The latter three titles are all published by the Ipswich-based independent press Aaaargh.

Davey's third novel, Toothpull of St Dunstan, a memoir of a dentist active beside Canterbury's Westgate for seven centuries, was published in April 2025. It was longlisted for the Queen Mary Small Press Fiction Prize.

== Reception ==
His literary fiction has been described as the "apotheosis of modernism" by David Collard in the Times Literary Supplement, a "fusillade of games and gags" by Leo Robson in the New Statesman, and "a joyful exploration of the novel's boundaries as a form" by Goldsmiths Prize judge A. L. Kennedy. Ian Patterson, in the London Review of Books, placed him in a "new crop" of experimental writers who have started to attract attention, alongside Eimear McBride, Will Eaves and Eley Williams.
