= The Vivisectors =

2026 novel by Missouri Williams

- Author: Missouri Williams
- Language: English
- Genres: Dark academia; Horror; Literary fiction
- Publisher: Fourth Estate (UK); Farrar, Straus and Giroux (US)
- Publication date: 2026
- Pages: 288
- ISBN: 9780374619299

The Vivisectors is a 2026 novel by English novelist Missouri Williams. The novel is Williams's second, following her Republic of Consciousness Prize-winning debut The Doloriad. It was subject to an eight-way publisher auction in 2024.

The novel was described by Vulture as one of the most anticipated novels of 2026. It has been described as a new kind of love story for an age of deteriorating communication and a strange campus novel. Williams herself describes the novel as continuing her exploration of families as enclosed domains, a theme present throughout her work.

== Plot ==
Set in an unnamed city amid a growing power struggle between the university's fading academic elite and a newly growing cadre of militant, semi-mystical gardeners. The gardeners are attempting to take control of relentless plant growth which is slowly consuming the city itself.

The novel begins with the mother of the protagonist (Agathe) attempting suicide. The next morning Agathe's uncle gives her some advice on not confusing the narrator and authors voices when writing. Agathe herself is a disinterested, cynical and ambitionless woman working for a fraudulent professor and now responsible for her once-estranged, now-paralyzed mother. She begins to feel frustration as the city, slowly becoming overgrown by roots & vegetation, is increasingly difficult to navigate her mothers wheelchair through.

Agathe's routine of stagnation and cynicism is disrupted when a new contrarian student named Adam clashes with a rising-star professor on campus. Adam and the professor both proclaim that they are experiencing discrimination and the conflict between them threatens to upend the already decaying university.

Wanting information of the situation, the fraudulent professor instructs Agathe to befriend Adam. Navigating this arrangement – and largely unaware of the emotional love story of which she has become unwittingly a part – she finds herself pulled into the political conflict within the city. Their strange love story is told throughout the exploration of the conflict between academics and gardeners and destabilizes her carefully constructed and maintained apathy.

Eventually the political situation devolves into open revolution. However, Agathe's own recollections profess that little changes and that the new looks remarkably familiar to what came before.

== Style ==
The Vivisectors continues Williams's stylistic strange and chaotic prose, described by Filip Jakab as "sentences [that] feel like the thrill of tossing a blow dryer into a hot, sudsy bathtub". The novel drew comparisons to Clarice Lispector, Anna Kavan, Rachel Kushner and Ottessa Moshfegh. Reviewers, however, highlighted a departure from the style of her debut novel through Agathe's more accessible voice. The sparse detail was noted also: for example, the protagonist's name is not revealed until page 135.

The novel is principally told through Agathe's own cynical recollections of events as they pertain to her own generation. The actual reality of scenes or occurrences are never illustrated. As a campus novel it drew comparison to others in the genre, such as The Secret History, but one review drew further comparison to "like Karl Ove Knausgaard at the end of the world". Underneath the "savage rush of description and dissection" happening throughout the novel, it was noted that there exists a recognisable "model campus romance" novel.

== Reception ==
Criticism was levelled at its ability to maintain tension when attempting too hard to maintain nuance. Ann Manov, writing for the New York Times, felt that while the novel pre-empts its own absence of detail, it appears to retreat into its own pretension, when little-to-no details ever emerge. Critics noted that it felt less brave then its predecessor, with a less cutting exploration of its subject.

Despite these criticisms, reviewers generally praised Williams's prose and imagination. The Guardian's review notes that the climax of the novel can even feel "mildly disappointing" with the novel's inventiveness, although noting this could be a thematic choice, due to the protagonist's cynicism.

The novel was announced amongst the longlist, in July 2026, for The Booker Prize. In September 2026 it was announced in the shortlist for the Goldsmiths Prize.
