= Queen Mary Small Press Fiction Prize =

Annual literary award for British and Irish fiction

Republic of Consciousness Prize
- Awarded for: Book of the year published by UK and Irish small presses
- Country: United Kingdom
- First award: 2017
- Website: Official website

The Queen Mary Small Press Fiction Prize, formerly called the Republic of Consciousness Prize for Small Presses, is an annual British literary prize founded by the author Neil Griffiths. It rewards fiction published by UK and Irish small presses, defined as those with fewer than five full-time employees. The prize money – initially raised by crowdfunding and latterly augmented by sponsorship – is divided between the publishing house, the author, and, if relevant, the translator.

== History ==
The prize was first awarded in 2017. It ran for nine years as the Republic of Consciousness Prize for Small Presses. In 2025 it announced that it was partnering with Queen Mary University and rebranding as the Queen Mary Small Press Fiction Prize. The first award under that name was the 2026 prize.

== Winners, shortlists and longlists ==
=== 2017 ===
The shortlist for the 2017 award was announced on 11 January 2017. The winner was announced on 9 March 2017.

- Winner: John Keene, Counternarratives (Fitzcarraldo Editions)
- Elnathan John, Born on a Tuesday (Cassava Republic Press)
- Mike McCormack, Solar Bones (Tramp Press)
- KJ Orr, Light Box (Daunt Books)
- Anakana Schofield, Martin John (And Other Stories)
- Paul Stanbridge, Forbidden Line (Galley Beggar Press)
- Diane Williams, Fine, Fine, Fine, Fine, Fine (CB Editions)
- Lara Williams, Treats (Freight Books)

Runners-up prizes were awarded to Martin John and Solar Bones; a Best First Novel prize for "Surfeit of Multitudinous Energy" was awarded to Forbidden Line. The following books were also longlisted for the prize:

- Kate Armstrong, The Storyteller (Holland House)
- Marcia Douglas, The Marvellous Equations of the Dread (Peepal Tree Press)
- Mia Gallagher, Beautiful Pictures of a Lost Homeland (New Island Books)
- Seraphina Madsen, Dodge and Burn (Dodo Ink)
- Sally O’Reilly, Crude (Eros)
- Faruk Šehić, Quiet Flows the Una, translated by Will Firth (Istros Books)
- Linda Stift, The Empress and the Cake, translated by Jamie Bolloch (Peirene Press)
- Chris Wilson, Glue Ponys (Tangerine Press)

=== 2018 ===
The shortlist for the 2018 award was announced on 19 February 2018. The winner was announced on 20 March 2018.

- Winner: Eley Williams, Attrib. and Other Stories (Influx Press)
- Ariana Harwicz, Die, My Love, translated by Sarah Moses and Carolina Orloff (Charco Press)
- David Hayden, Darker with the Lights On (Little Island Press)
- Noémi Lefebvre, Blue Self-Portrait, translated by Sophie Lewis (Les Fugitives)
- Preti Taneja, We That Are Young (Galley Beggar Press)
- Isabel Waidner, Gaudy Bauble (Dostoyevsky Wannabe)

The following books were also longlisted for the prize:

- Patty Yumi Cottrell, Sorry to Disrupt the Peace (And Other Stories)
- Kevin Davey, Playing Possum (Aaaargh! Press)
- Mathias Énard, Compass, translated by Charlotte Mandell (Fitzcarraldo Editions)
- Arja Kajermo, The Iron Age (Tramp Press)
- Ben Myers, The Gallows Pole (Bluemoose Books)
- Simon Okotie, In the Absence of Absalon (Salt Publishing)
- Jack Robinson, An Overcoat (CB Editions)

A special prize was awarded to Charles Boyle both publisher, as CB Editions, and, under the pseudonym Jack Robinson, author of An Overcoat: "The William Gass award for metafiction and for being the best person in publishing, like ever."

=== 2019 ===
The shortlist for the 2019 award was announced on 2 March 2019. The joint winners were announced on 28 March 2019.

- Winner: Will Eaves, Murmur (CB Editions)
- Winner: Alex Pheby, Lucia (Galley Beggar Press)
- Daša Drndić, Doppelgänger, translated by Celia Hawkesworth & S. D. Curtis (Istros Books)
- Wendy Erskine, Sweet Home (The Stinging Fly)
- Anthony Joseph, Kitch: A Fictional Biography of a Calypso Icon (Peepal Tree Press)
- Chris McCabe, Dedalus (Henningham Family Press)

The following books were also longlisted for the prize:

- Jean Frémon, Now, Now, Louison, translated by Cole Swensen (Les Fugitives)
- Julián Fuks, Resistance, translated by Daniel Hahn (Charco Press)
- Nora Ikstena, Soviet Milk, translated by Margita Gailitis (Peirene Press)
- Gabriel Josipovici, The Cemetery in Barnes (Carcanet Press)
- Sophie van Llewyn, Bottled Goods (Fairlight Books)
- Sue Rainsford, Follow Me to Ground (New Island Books)
- Nicholas John Turner, Hang Him When He Is Not There (Splice)

=== 2020 ===
The shortlist for the 2020 award was announced on 26 February 2020. The Winner was announced on 30 March 2020.

- Winner: Jean-Baptiste Del Amo, Animalia, translated by Frank Wynne (Fitzcarraldo Editions)
- Toby Litt, Patience (Galley Beggar Press)
- Hanne Ørstavik, Love, translated by Martin Aitken (And Other Stories)
- Minoli Salgado, Broken Jaw (The 87 Press)
- Isabel Waidner, We Are Made of Diamond Stuff (Dostoyevsky Wannabe)

The following books were also longlisted for the prize:

- Mara Coson, Aliasing (Book Works)
- Sarah Henstra, The Red Word (Tramp Press)
- Rónán Hession, Leonard and Hungry Paul (Bluemoose Books)
- Caleb Klaces, Fatherhood (Prototype Publishing)
- Melissa Lee-Houghton, That Lonesome Valley (Morbid Books)
- Juan Rulfo, El Llano in flames, translated by Stephen Beechinor (Structo Press)
- Faruk Šehić, Under Pressure, translated by Mirza Purić (Istros Books)

=== 2021 ===
The shortlist for the 2021 prize was announced on 26 March 2021. The winner was announced on 19 May 2021.

- Winner: Shola von Reinhold, Lote (Jacaranda Books)
- Lynne Tillman, Men and Apparitions (Peninsula Press)
- Monique Roffey, The Mermaid of Black Conch (Peepal Tree Press)
- Luis Sagasti, A Musical Offering, translated by Fionn Petch (Charco Press)
- Doireann Ní Ghríofa, A Ghost in the Throat (Tramp Press)

The following books were also longlisted for the prize.

- Katharina Volckmer, The Appointment (Fitzcarraldo Editions)
- Alex Pheby, Mordew (Galley Beggar Press)
- Paul Griffiths, Mr Beethoven (Henningham Family Press)
- Huw Lemmey and Hildegard von Bingen, Unknown Language (Ignota Books)
- Alhierd Bacharevič, Alindarka’s Children, translated by Jim Dingley & Petra Reid (Scotland Street Press)

=== 2022 ===
The shortlist for the 2022 prize was announced on 27 March 2022. The winner was announced on 11 May 2022.

- Winner: Norman Erikson Pasaribu, Happy Stories, Mostly, translated by Tiffany Tsao (Tilted Axis Press)
- Scholastique Mukasonga, Our Lady of the Nile, translated by Melanie Mauthner (Daunt Books)
- Vanessa Onwuemezi, Dark Neighbourhood (Fitzcarraldo Editions)
- Montserrat Roig, The Song of Youth, translated by Tiago Miller (Fum D'Estampa Press)
- Isabel Waidner, Sterling Karat Gold (Peninsula Press)

The following books were also longlisted for the prize:

- Mona Arshi, Somebody Loves You (And Other Stories)
- Badr Ahmad, Five Days Untold, translated by Christiaan James (Dar Arab)
- Ryan Dennis, The Beasts They Turned Away (Epoque Press)
- Jonas Eika, After the Sun, translated by Sherilyn Nicolette Hellberg (Lolli Editions)

=== 2023 ===
The shortlist for the 2023 prize was announced on 16 March 2023. The winner was announced on 26 April 2023.

- Winner: Missouri Williams, The Doloriad (Dead Ink)
- Steven J Fowler, MUEUM (Tenement Press)
- Nate Lippens, My Dead Book (Pilot Press)
- Sheena Patel, I’m a Fan (Rough Trade Books)
- Thuận, Chinatown, translated by Nguyễn An Lý (Tilted Axis Press)

The following books were also longlisted for the prize:

- Fatima Daas, The Last One, translated by Lara Vergnaud (Hope Road)
- Eva Ďurovec, New Mindmapping Forms (Montez Press)
- Yewande Omotoso, An Unusual Grief (Cassava Republic Press)
- John Smith, Little Boy (Boiler House Press)
- Zoë Wicomb, Still Life (Peninsula Press)

=== 2024 ===
The shortlist for the 2024 prize was announced on 4 March 2024. The winner was announced on 17 April 2024.

- Winner: Ana Paula Maia, Of Cattle and Men, translated by Zoë Perry (Charco Press)
- Farai Mudzingwa, Avenues by Train (Cassava Republic)
- Sheyla Smanioto, Out of Earth, translated by Laura Garmeson & Sophie Lewis (Dead Ink)
- Miri Yu, The End of August, translated by Morgan Giles (Tilted Axis Press)
- Maxim Znak, The Zekameron, translated by Jim & Ella Dingley (Scotland Street Press)

A prize for Outstanding First Novel went to Out of Earth. The following books were also longlisted for the prize:

- Ventura Ametller, Summa Kaotica, translated by Douglas Suttle (Fum d’Estampa Press)
- Emilienne Malfatto, May the Tigris Grieve for You, translated by Lorna Scott Fox (Les Fugitives)
- So Mayer, Truth & Dare (Cipher Press)
- Olga Ravn, My Work, translated by Sophia Hersi Smith & Jennifer Russell (Lolli Editions)
- Krisztina Tóth, Barcode, translated by Peter Sherwood (Jantar Press)

=== 2025 ===
The 2025 longlist was announced on 30 January 2025. The shortlist was announced in February 2025 and the winner on 1 April 2025.

- Winner: Gaëlle Bélem, There’s a Monster Behind the Door, translated by Karen Fleetwood and Laëtitia Saint-Loubert (Bullaun Press)
- Catherine Axelrad, Célina, translated by Philip Terry (Les Fugitives)
- Marouane Bakhti, How to Leave the World, translated by Lara Vergnaud (Divided Publishing)
- Charles Boyle, Invisible Dogs, (CB Editions)
- Glen James Brown, Mother Naked (Peninsula Press)

The following books were also longlisted for the prize:

- Sulaiman Addonia, The Seers (Prototype)
- Jenni Daiches, Somewhere Else (Scotland Street Press)
- Ella Frears, Good Lord (Rough Trade)
- Karen Jennings, Crooked Seeds (Holland House Books)
- Nathan Knapp, Daybook (Splice)

=== 2026 ===
The 2026 results were announced on 25 March 2026. The prize was awarded jointly to two winners.

- Joint winner: Rebecca Gransden, Figures Crossing the Field Towards the Group (Tangerine Press)
- Joint winner: Nell Osborne, Ghost Driver (Moist Books)

The following books were shortlisted:

- Saima Begum, The First Jasmines (Hajar Press)
- David Brennan, Spit (époque press)
- Jackie Ess, Darryl (Divided Publishing)

The following books were longlisted:

- Kevin Davey, Toothpull of St Dunstan (Aaaargh! Press)
- Martha Luisa Hernández Cadenas, The Weasel and the Whore, translated by Julia Sanches and Jennifer Shyue (Héloïse Press)
- Noboru Tsujihara, Mistress Koharu, translated by Kalau Almony (Honford Star)
- Shady Lewis, On the Greenwich Line, translated by Katharine Halls (Peirene Press)
- Vincent Delecroix, Small Boat, translated by Helen Stevenson (Small Axes/HopeRoad)
