= Localization of Square Enix video games =

Regional adaptation of video games

The Japanese video game developer and publisher Square Enix (formerly two companies called Square and Enix prior to 2003) has been translating its games for North America since the late 1980s, and the PAL region and Asia since the late 1990s. It has not always released all of its games in all major regions, and continues to selectively release games even today depending on multiple factors such as the viability of platforms or the condition of the game itself. The process of localization has changed during that time from having a one-person team with a short time and tight memory capacities to having a team of translators preparing simultaneous launches in multiple languages.

The companies' first major projects were Dragon Quest and Final Fantasy, which each proved successful enough to launch video game franchises. Since then, the majority of the games produced by the companies have been localized for Western audiences, although the process was not given a high priority at Square until the international success of Final Fantasy VII. A dedicated localization department was consequently created at the company's Tokyo headquarters around 1998. Enix remained without a translation department until its merger with Square in 2003. The process of localization has evolved over time in response to difficult experiences with various titles. Most major titles are now developed with localization running in parallel to development, with more simultaneous releases and even occasional titles developed in localized form first in order to appeal to the Western market.

== Staff ==
The localization staff at Square Enix works mainly from Japanese to English, French, German, Spanish, Italian, as well as Russian, Korean and Mandarin for a number of titles. In 2016, Final Fantasy XV became the first major title from the company to release in Latin American Spanish and Brazilian Portuguese. Minor titles are occasionally localized from English to European languages. Prior to the merger of Square and Enix in 2003, Enix did not initially have a localization department and outsourced its Western releases to translators who had no close contact with the original development teams, as was the case for Dragon Quest VII. Square also did not initially have a localization department, though a number of localizers such as Kaoru Moriyama and Ted Woolsey worked with them regularly on a contractual basis in the early 1990s. Moriyama described the work at the time as leaving very little leeway for polishing text due to the limitations of the ROM sizes. She also commented Hironobu Sakaguchi was not willing to put extra work for the English version at that time. Following the massive international success of Final Fantasy VII, however, the company looked into improving the quality of its translated products, since the game was widely criticized for its rushed English translation, which had been handled entirely by Michael Baskett, the company's only in-house translator at the time. To that end, Square tasked Richard Honeywood, originally a programmer, with creating a dedicated localization team in the Tokyo headquarters. His first major project was Xenogears. While there were only two members at first, including Honeywood, the staff grew to include more than 40 employees by 2007, and over 70 in 2015.

== Approach ==
Before a translation is greenlit and translators are allocated for each language, the localization, quality assurance (QA) and marketing staff play through a build of the game and sometimes do a focus group study. The localization team's playthrough can sometimes take over 100 hours of gameplay. Once the company greenlights a localization project, a period of brainstorming starts in which glossary, style, naming schemes and fonts are chosen. During the translation phase, voiced sections are translated first. Text files are cross-checked by multiple translators and editors. The text is then integrated along with any graphic and sound changes, and the game goes to quality assurance. During a period of several weeks to up to three months, Japanese QA teams look for bugs while Western QA teams check linguistic issues. The localization team often re-plays the game during this phase, translates the manuals and help out on the guidebooks if these are made. Finally, the game is sent to the hardware manufacturers to be approved.

Challenges for the localization teams include space limitation (due to data storage and/or on-screen space), achieving a natural dialogue flow despite multiple plot branches and script lines being stored out of order, and, when voiced footage is not re-recorded for lip movement, dealing with file length and lip-synch limitations. When the same team works on different games in a series such as Final Fantasy, they often need to adopt different writing styles depending on the setting of their games. Another point to consider is humorous elements that do not translate properly into English, and different cultural expectations about character interactions. The localization process depends on factors such as the development teams' wishes, as well as budget and schedule. Historically, translation started late in development or after the original Japanese release, but beginning with Final Fantasy VIII, titles are translated concurrently with initial development, making the translators function more like additional planners or consultants. A few titles, like The Bouncer, have actually been recorded in English first and then adapted to Japanese. The Last Remnant also adopted this approach, featuring motion-capture and dialogue synched to English rather than Japanese actors. This was done due to the company's wish to create a title for the international market.

Many early localizations made heavy use of antiquated speech patterns and archaic nouns such as "thee" and "thou". Square was not greatly focused on their localizations before the worldwide commercial success of Final Fantasy VII. In later years, the original translators were joined by editors to catch grammar and spelling errors. Prior to the development of Final Fantasy XIII-2, the standard localization process for a title involved dual development between the company's sound and localization departments, which meant that difficulties could arise because of constant changes to dialogue. Starting from XIII-2, in-house development tools, such as Moomle and Rosetta, have been developed to ensure all parts of the process were properly synchronized and centralized. In modern localizations, teams have tended to adopt two different approaches to translation and localization: either they remain quite faithful to the original Japanese, or they can make large changes as long as the story outline remains the same. The former method was adopted for Final Fantasy XIII and its sequels, although some alterations were made in order to make the English dialogue sound natural. In choosing voice actors, the company prefers to avoid well-known film and television actors, citing Elliot Page's casting in Beyond: Two Souls as a counterexample. Vagrant Story, generally recognized as a high-quality localization, made some significant changes in style: whereas the original Japanese text was rather straightforward, the English version made use of archaic Medieval and Old English words and dialogue.

=== Experiences ===
Honeywood described Xenogears, his first translation project at Square and the first to be handled internally by the company, as "pure hell". He said that he started to change the company's approach to localization after that game, moving booths to always work very closely with the original development teams, improving communication with them, and introducing full-time editors. Woolsey, an English translator in the SNES era, also had a troublesome time while localizing Secret of Mana, which he said "nearly killed [him]". The translation was completed within a month of the Japanese release as Square wanted to catch the 1993 holiday season. Final Fantasy XIII's localization, handled by Phil Bright and Tom Slattery, was also quite chaotic. According to Slattery, the lack of deadlines, poor communication and synchronization between the various departments, and continuing changes to the script and to cutscenes led to a turbulent development. Due to the script changes, large sections of dialogue needed to be re-translated and re-recorded by the English actors due to lack of necessary emotional drive for the scenes. In contrast, Alexander O. Smith, who is often associated with the Ivalice games, had a good working relationship with Yasumi Matsuno during the localization of titles like Vagrant Story, Final Fantasy XII and the 2010 remake of Tactics Ogre. The two worked closely to ensure that the English versions were faithful to Matsuno's vision. A challenging localization was Final Fantasy X, the first Final Fantasy title to feature voice acting. There, the team faced problems in both making the dialogue more compatible with an English-speaking audience and lip-synching it roughly with in-game characters, whose lip-movement was still for the original Japanese dialogue.

== Changes ==
When translating its game titles, Square Enix tries to take into account the cultural differences between Japan and the target territories. This sometimes involves rewriting dialogue or altering graphics, animations, and sounds. For instance, in Chocobo Racing, visual references to the Japanese folk heroes Momotarō and Kiji were changed to depict Hansel and Gretel, since the game was designed mainly for children, and Hansel and Gretel are better known in the West than Momotarō and Kiji. According to Honeywood, trying to explain to the original development teams why some changes are needed can range from "frustrating to downright hilarious". Generally, older development teams trust the translators with making changes while newer teams can be more reluctant, though they usually build up trust gradually. The localization team for The World Ends with You chose to preserve the Japanese elements to ensure the game's cultural aspect remained intact. While localizing Final Fantasy XII, translators Smith and Reeder worked to preserve the original script's meaning while using English dialects to reproduce the Japanese dialects found in the original version to identify factions within the game.

Final Fantasy VII's script was done by a small team, resulting in a rough script and inconsistencies. One of the more famous of these was the name of Aerith Gainsborough: the name was originally meant to be a merging of "Air" and "Earth", but her name in the original English release was spelled "Aeris". Similar space issues frequently motivated character renames in older games, such as Chrono Trigger's Crono and Final Fantasy IX's Amarant, originally named Salamander. During his localization of Secret of Mana in 1993, Woolsey was forced to trim down vast amounts of character dialogue due to an awkward fixed text font, later stating that he was satisfied with the final result. With ports and remakes of older games, dialogue can be changed or added by the team, as in the case of Final Fantasy VI. The title can also be altered for various reasons. Final Fantasy IV and VI were released in North America as Final Fantasy II and III. This was due to the fact that the original II and III on NES had not received a Western release. The Final Fantasy Legend was originally to be called The Great Warrior Saga, but changed it to its current title to tie in with the Final Fantasy series, which was well-known and popular in North America. A prequel to Secret of Mana, Seiken Densetsu, was similarly renamed Final Fantasy Adventure in its North American release, only to be later renamed again to Mystic Quest in Europe, in an attempt to tie it with the unrelated Final Fantasy Mystic Quest. Dragon Quest, one of the earliest successful Japanese role-playing games, had its title changed to Dragon Warrior so as not to confuse it with the similarly titled tabletop role-playing game DragonQuest. The DragonQuest title was discontinued in 1987, and Square Enix registered the Dragon Quest trademark for their use in 2003. Also due to copyright issues, The World Ends with You could not be released under its original Japanese title It's a Wonderful World.

Gameplay may be altered when it is felt that a game might be too easy or difficult for the Western audience. Some of the older Final Fantasy titles, such as Final Fantasy IV, were altered to be more easy to play in the West than in Japan, though their remakes and ports have generally restored the difficulty. Einhänder's gameplay also received notable cuts for its North American release. On the other hand, Final Fantasy XII: Revenant Wings was made more difficult in localized versions because the Western market was judged "more familiar" with the real-time strategy genre than the Japanese market. For the Western release of Dissidia Final Fantasy, the game was changed to suit Western players, including removing several RPG elements to make it more akin to an action game. Censorship can also affect the localized versions of the games and require obscuring mature themes, rewriting risqué remarks or phrases, altering graphics or removing parts of some scenes. This was common in the NES and SNES eras but less drastic later on once video game content rating systems were established. Original Western releases of early games in the Final Fantasy and Dragon Quest featured multiple occurrences of this form of censorship. Final Fantasy VIII also received some censorship for its European release, including the removal of a Nazi-like uniform. Less commonly, this also goes the other way, for instance with Final Fantasy XII, in which a sequence involving violence against a female character was censored in the Japanese version but restored in the American and European releases. References to religion can also be removed, as in Final Fantasy IV and VI. Such references in Xenogears caused Square to consider not releasing it in North America.

== Releases ==
In 2008, Square Enix expressed willingness to make worldwide "simultaneous releases the norm". Concerning Final Fantasy XI, at the time of the original English-only European release in 2004, producer Hiromichi Tanaka had stated that while Japanese/North American/Australian simultaneous releases are possible due to translating only Japanese to English, it was not possible for European countries due to the difficulty of finding good Japanese-to-European-languages translators, and the fact that second-hand translations from the English would be akin to "Chinese whispers". However, the team later integrated full-fledged French and German localization teams, achieving simultaneous release from the Japanese for three different languages from 2007 on. Another example of synchronized localization is Final Fantasy XIII: the company started the localization process in several languages alongside the game's development to lessen the delay between the local and international releases.

Final Fantasy XIV: A Realm Reborn was localized in-house by Square Enix under supervision by Naoki Yoshida. Dedicated teams were formed for each language, with Koji Fox leading the English version. Compared to its predecessor, which featured English-only voice-overs even in the Japanese release, A Realm Reborn featured English, Japanese, German and French voice-overs, with all languages released in simultaneous fashion similar to Final Fantasy XI. The game featured voice work in a low number of cutscenes: this was explained by the fact that the team did not want new voice recording to dominate the creation of new content after the initial release. The team later added Korean and Chinese languages to the game, albeit released in a different schedule as service is separate. The Western release of Lightning Returns: Final Fantasy XIII was delayed by over two months because of the large amount of dialogue, which changes due to the game's time mechanic, that needed to be translated and recorded.

The viability of a game's platform can also affect both the localization and the release, as in the case of the PlayStation Portable-exclusive Final Fantasy Type-0, which would eventually come West as a high definition port for PlayStation 4 and Xbox One, and Seiken Densetsu 3, which was not localized due to undefined technical problems. Starting in 2014, select titles made their Japanese voice tracks available as downloadable content, as in the case of Lightning Returns: Final Fantasy XIII and Drakengard 3. Another aspect of Square Enix's policy concerning the Western release of games was to make games that appealed to both Western and Japanese audiences, but the worldwide success of the Japan-aimed Bravely Default caused them to rethink their strategy. Although English was originally the main language of Square Enix's foreign releases, including in non-English speaking countries, some titles may debut without an English release, such as the Chinese version of Dragon Quest X before a North American or European release has been confirmed.

=== Additional content ===
The localized versions sometimes expand on the original games. For example, when Honeywood found contradictions in the story of Chrono Cross in 2000, he worked with Masato Kato, the director and scenario writer of the game, to rewrite sections and add explanatory dialogue which was not in the original version. For Dragon Quest VIII: Journey of the Cursed King, voice-overs and orchestral music were recorded for the Western releases in 2005, while the original Japanese version did not have them. Final Fantasy Tactics: War of the Lions also featured voice acting that was not included in the original Japanese release in 2007. Generally, gameplay content left out of the original game due to time constraints may be completed and added in the localized versions. Sometimes, the expanded localized versions of games from series like Kingdom Hearts and Final Fantasy are re-released in Japan. The re-releases are usually based on a direct port of the North American releases, with English dialogue replacing the original Japanese audio, the Japanese text acting as subtitles. They can also include features and tweaks previously only available in the Western version alongside other additions, such as adding Japanese voice acting to the 3DS version of Dragon Quest VIII.

== Reception ==
1UP.com's Wesley Fenlon praised Square Enix for the high quality of its translations, especially as space allocated for text and dialogue had been expanded with new and re-released versions of games. Jeremy Parish, writing for the same site, said that the quality of Square Enix's English localizations had "gone from laughable [...] to some of the best around". Both praise and criticism has been given to individual games for the quality of their localizations. Xenogears, the company's first game to feature voice acting, drew criticism in regard to its audio presentation, while The Bouncer received a fairly positive response. Final Fantasy X received praise, although poor lip-synching and some aspects of the actors' performances were criticized. The choice of changing a major line from "Thank you" to "I love you" also received mixed reactions. The English release of X-2 ended up receiving the Seventh Annual Academy of Interactive Arts & Sciences award in 2004 for Outstanding Achievement in Character Performance. Final Fantasy XII and Vagrant Story were both highly praised for the qualities of their localizations. During the development of Final Fantasy XV, director Hajime Tabata directly responded to feedback on the English localization of the game.

== See also ==
- Ted Woolsey
- Richard Honeywood
- Alexander O. Smith
- Michael-Christopher Koji Fox
