= Alexander O. Smith =

American translator and author

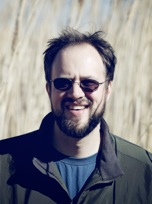
- Education: Bachelor of Arts, Dartmouth College/Keio University, 1995; Master of Arts, Harvard University, 1998
- Occupations: Translator, author
- Years active: 1997–present
- Notable work: Vagrant Story, Phoenix Wright: Ace Attorney, Final Fantasy XII

Alexander O. Smith is a professional Japanese to English translator and author. While his output covers many areas such as adaptation of Japanese novels, manga, song lyrics, anime scripts, and various academic works, he is best known for his software localizations of Japanese video games including Vagrant Story, Phoenix Wright: Ace Attorney, and Final Fantasy XII. He currently resides in Kamakura, Japan, where he operates his own contract localization business, Kajiya Productions, and is co-founder of a translation and publishing company, Bento Books.

== Biography ==
Smith first gained an interest in Japanese after attending an exchange program in northern China. He obtained a Bachelor of Arts degree in Japanese from Dartmouth College/Keio University in 1995, and a Master of Arts degree in Classical Japanese Literature from Harvard University in 1998. Just before graduation, he interned at Sega, during which he was asked to perform voice-over for Winter Heat. His first work in translation was as a subtitler for Japanese television dramas. Smith joined Square after earning his master's degree, working as part of Richard Honeywood's nascent localization team. On his first project, Final Fantasy VIII, he and the other translators were not given access to the game files; they were instead forced to hack in their new dialogue using GameSharks during testing. In 1999, he worked as the main English translator for Yasumi Matsuno's Vagrant Story. Reviewers noted the high quality of the English script, in which Smith utilized various archaic English idioms and slang that distinguished the game from its straightforward Japanese counterpart. His last major work as a Square employee was on Final Fantasy X, for which he was awarded "Best Localization" of 2001 by RPGamer.

Smith left Square in 2002 to found Kajiya Productions—a freelance translation and localization company—with Joseph Reeder, his co-translator on Final Fantasy XII, though he would continue to collaborate on Square and Square Enix titles. By working as a contractor, he found that he had better access to the development team to aid in his translation process, free from the fetters of corporate communication protocols. In 2005, during the protracted development of Final Fantasy XII, Capcom hired Smith to work on the localization of Phoenix Wright: Ace Attorney. He found director Shu Takumi's writing to be very funny and clever, which drew him to the challenge of translating Takumi's jokes and wordplay. Smith joined the Final Fantasy XII project after Yasumi Matsuno, the original director, had left and was not able to collaborate on the script with him directly, unlike with Vagrant Story. Principal voice recording took place over eight weeks, with months of translation work both before and after that. Smith worked with Matsuno again on the 2011 PlayStation Portable remake of Tactics Ogre: Let Us Cling Together (titled Wheel of Fortune), which received a brand new translation. In 2011, Smith co-founded a book translation and publishing company called Bento Books with his friend Tony Gonzalez and his Kajiya Productions partner Joseph Reeder. The company's first major work was Math Girls, a mathematics-themed young adult novel by Hiroshi Yuki.

In addition to translation, Smith has composed English lyrics for a number of Nobuo Uematsu's vocal tracks, including "Melodies of Life" from Final Fantasy IX, "Otherworld" from Final Fantasy X, and "Eternity" from Blue Dragon. He also arranged lyrics for "The Skies Above" and "Otherworld" on The Skies Above, the second album from Uematsu's band, The Black Mages, and performed the spoken word intro to "Maybe I'm a Lion" as well.

== Process ==
With his translations, Smith goes to great lengths to preserve the experience of the original text as much as possible, especially if it has a distinct feel. For The Devotion of Suspect X, he mirrored Higashino's "sparse, methodical tone of Japanese" by using more elevated and formal language. He draws on his academic background in classical Japanese literature to inform some of these translations. When it comes to the question of leaving Japan-specific terms untranslated, Smith is careful to either translate around it or provide a concise description of the term. He only resorts to leaving a word in Japanese in rare, plot-critical cases, such as with a kotatsu used as a murder weapon in The Devotion of Suspect X, stating "Nothing kills the flow of a text more than a long-winded explanation of something which would have come second nature to a reader of the original [Japanese]". For less "literary" mediums like manga and games, Smith feels more free to maximize the audience's enjoyment if a strict literal translation that adheres to the original sentence structure would impede that enjoyment.

Smith considers his treatment of Vagrant Story and Final Fantasy XII among his best translations. He looks to Vagrant Story as a title that demands to be in English and thought of his work as revealing the inner English game that always existed underneath. Smith was able to speak directly with Matsuno to improve the script translation, marking the first of their many collaborations. For Final Fantasy XII, his role entailed rebuilding the world to make sense for an English-speaking audience. He chose to portray the Archadian Imperials with a British accent to distinguish them from the American-accented Resistance members. For both of these titles, Smith relied on Matsuno's dense notes on the world's backstory to capture subtle and implied connections and preserve the rich texture of the game.

Smith compares translating lip synced dialogue to writing entirely in haiku. The 7% of Final Fantasy XII's script that was voiced took more time to translate than the remaining 93%. In his role as voice producer, Smith searched for character actors like John DiMaggio and British stage actors for the judges. He was pleased by the performance of Johnny McKeown, the child actor who portrayed Larsa, a precocious prince. Smith was able to rewrite the script based on the actors he had cast for each character. He also made a key change to one of the final lines of Final Fantasy X with scenario writer Kazushige Nojima's approval. In the original Japanese, the main character's love interest, Yuna, tells the main character "arigatō" just before he fades away. Although the word literally means "thank you", Smith chose to elaborate on the connotations of the word and the tone of the scene, settling on "I love you"—the first time the phrase has appeared in a Final Fantasy game.

== Works ==
=== Video games ===
Title	Year (Note: Sorted by year of English language release)	Platform(s)	Notes (Note: Credited as translator or localization specialist unless noted)	Ref.
Winter Heat	1997	Sega Saturn	Cast & narration	
Final Fantasy VIII	1999	PlayStation		
Final Fantasy Anthology	1999	PlayStation	Translation support	
Chocobo's Dungeon 2	1999	PlayStation		
Koudelka	1999	PlayStation	Editor	
Front Mission 3	2000	PlayStation		
The Misadventures of Tron Bonne	2000	PlayStation	Editor	
Vagrant Story	2000	PlayStation		
Legend of Mana	2000	PlayStation	Special thanks	
Parasite Eve II	2000	PlayStation		
Final Fantasy IX	2000	PlayStation	Lyricist, "Melodies of Life"	
Bloody Roar 3	2001	GameCube, PlayStation 2, Xbox		
Mega Man Battle Network	2001	Game Boy Advance		
Final Fantasy X	2001	PlayStation 2	Also lyricist, "Otherworld"	
Mega Man Battle Network 2	2002	Game Boy Advance		
Breath of Fire: Dragon Quarter	2003	PlayStation 2		
Everblue 2	2003	PlayStation 2	Editor	
Final Fantasy Tactics Advance	2003	Game Boy Advance		
Final Fantasy XI	2003	Microsoft Windows, PlayStation 2, Xbox 360		
Fire Emblem	2003	Game Boy Advance		
Final Fantasy X-2	2003	PlayStation 2	Editor, US recording producer	
Final Fantasy Crystal Chronicles	2004	GameCube	Special thanks	
Star Ocean: Till the End of Time	2004	PlayStation 2		
Phoenix Wright: Ace Attorney	2005	Nintendo DS		
Final Fantasy XII	2006	PlayStation 2	Also US recording producer	
Blue Dragon	2007	Xbox 360	Lyricist, "Eternity"	
Apollo Justice: Ace Attorney	2008	Nintendo DS		
Final Fantasy Tactics A2: Grimoire of the Rift	2008	Nintendo DS		
Valkyria Chronicles	2008	PlayStation 3	English ADR writer	
MadWorld	2009	Wii	Scenario translator	
Mario & Sonic at the Olympic Winter Games	2009	Wii, Nintendo DS		
Gyromancer	2009	Microsoft Windows, Xbox 360	Also editor	
Vanquish	2010	PlayStation 3, Xbox 360	Editor	
Tactics Ogre: Let Us Cling Together	2011	PlayStation Portable		
Final Fantasy V	2011	PlayStation Network	Translation support	
Rhythm Thief & the Emperor's Treasure	2012	Nintendo 3DS		
Crimson Shroud	2012	Nintendo 3DS		
Anarchy Reigns	2013	PlayStation 3, Xbox 360		
The Wonderful 101	2013	Wii U		
Final Fantasy XII The Zodiac Age	2017	PlayStation 4, Microsoft Windows		
428: Shibuya Scramble	2018	Microsoft Windows, PlayStation 4	Editor	
Ori and the Will of the Wisps	2020	Microsoft Windows, Xbox One	Writer	
Humanity	2023	Microsoft Windows, PlayStation 4, PlayStation 5	Writer	

=== Other works ===
Title	Year	Medium	Original author	Notes	Ref.
Guin Saga	2003–2008	Novel	Kaoru Kurimoto	Novel series; translated with Elye Alexander	
Samurai Deeper Kyo	2004–2007	Manga	Akimine Kamijyo	Volumes 6–21; translated with Rich Amtower	
Shaolin Sisters	2005	Manga	Narumi Kakinouchi	Volumes 1–5; translated with Rich Amtower	
Dr. Slump	2005–2009	Manga	Akira Toriyama	Translated with Rich Amtower	
Fullmetal Alchemist	2005–2007	Novel	Makoto Inoue	Light novel series; translated with Rich Amtower	
The Twelve Kingdoms	2007–2010	Novel	Fuyumi Ono	Light novel series; translated with Elye Alexander	
Brave Story	2007	Novel	Miyuki Miyabe		
Muhyo & Roji's Bureau of Supernatural Investigation	2007–2010	Manga	Yoshiyuki Nishi		
Cowa!	2008	Manga	Akira Toriyama		
All You Need Is Kill	2009	Novel	Hiroshi Sakurazaka		
The Summer of the Ubume	2009	Novel	Natsuhiko Kyogoku	Translated with Elye Alexander and Amanda Jun Katsurada	
The Book of Heroes	2010	Novel	Miyuki Miyabe		
Harmony	2010	Novel	Project Itoh		
The Devotion of Suspect X	2011	Novel	Keigo Higashino	Translated with Elye Alexander	
Rocket Girls 2: The Last Planet	2011	Novel	Hōsuke Nojiri		
ICO: Castle in the Mist	2011	Novel	Miyuki Miyabe		
10 Billion Days & 100 Billion Nights	2011	Novel	Ryu Mitsuse	Translated with Elye Alexander	
Salvation of a Saint	2012	Novel	Keigo Higashino	Translated with Elye Alexander	
Malice	2014	Novel	Keigo Higashino		
Journey Under the Midnight Sun	2015	Novel	Keigo Higashino		
A Midsummer's Equation: a Detective Galileo novel	2016	Novel	Keigo Higashino		

== See also ==
- Localization of Square Enix video games
- Richard Honeywood – Smith's superior at Square's localization department
