= FFCC =

FFCC may refer to:

- Final Fantasy Crystal Chronicles, a video game series
- Florida Film Critics Circle, an organization of film reviewers
- Flowery Field Cricket Club, an English cricket club
- Full Faith and Credit Clause, part of the United States Constitution
- Florida Federation of Colorguards Circuit, a circuit of Florida indoor winds, indoor drumline, and colorguard
