= Badr Ahmad =

Yemeni writer

Badr Ahmad (born 1979) is a Yemeni writer who lives in the southwestern city of Ibb.

== Works ==
Ahmad's works include:

- Five Days Unknown (2021) which was translated into English by Christiaan James and was nominated for the Republic of Consciousness Prize.
- Black Rains, parts of which have been translated into English
- Between Two Doors (2018) which was translated into Italian under the title Tra Due Porte.
