= David Hayden (author) =

Irish author

David Hayden is an Irish writer. His first collection of stories, Darker With the Lights On (2017), was shortlisted for the Republic of Consciousness Prize, as well as The London Magazine & Collyer Bristow Prize.

Hayden has written for outlets such as The Guardian, Granta, and LitHub.

== Selected works ==
=== Short story collections ===
- Darker With the Lights On. Oakland, CA: Transit Books. 2018. ISBN 978-1-945492-11-2.
