= Final Fantasy Crystal Chronicles: My Life as a Darklord =

2009 video game

- Developer: Square Enix
- Publisher: Square Enix
- Director: Hiroyuki Kaneko
- Producers: Takamasa Shiba; Hiroaki Iwano
- Designer: Hiroyuki Kaneko
- Programmer: Satoshi Kitade
- Artist: Yasuhisa Izumisawa
- Writers: Motomu Toriyama; Sachie Hirano
- Composer: Kumi Tanioka
- Series: Final Fantasy (main); Crystal Chronicles (sub)
- Platform: Wii
- Release: JP: June 30, 2009; PAL: July 17, 2009; NA: July 20, 2009
- Genre: Tower defense
- Mode: Single-player

Final Fantasy Crystal Chronicles: My Life as a Darklord (Note: Known in Japan as Hikari to Yami no Himegimi to Sekaiseifuku no Tō: Fainaru Fantajī Kurisutaru Kuronikuru (Japanese: 光と闇の姫君と世界征服の塔 ファイナルファンタジー・クリスタルクロニクル; lit. The Princess of Light and Darkness and the Tower of World Conquest: Final Fantasy Crystal Chronicles)) is a 2009 tower defense video game developed and published by Square Enix for the Wii and distributed through the WiiWare download service. The game is an entry in the Final Fantasy franchise, forming part of the Crystal Chronicles subseries. Taking place after Final Fantasy Crystal Chronicles: My Life as a King, the game follows the titular Darklord as she defends her mobile tower from waves of attacks as it travels across the kingdom.

Planned during production of My Life as a King, My Life as a Darklord began development in 2008. The game's aesthetic was influenced by lolita gothic and punk fashion. The narrative, and the protagonist, were designed to subvert both series and genre conventions. Composer Kumi Tanioka returned, having previously worked on the other Crystal Chronicles titles. The game received generally positive reviews, with critics generally praising the game's gameplay and presentation while critiquing a lack of in-game depth.

== Gameplay ==
A level in Final Fantasy Crystal Chronicles: My Life as a Darklord; waves of soldiers attack, beginning at the bottom floor and fighting against soldiers positioned inside.

Final Fantasy Crystal Chronicles: My Life as a Darklord is a tower defense video game; the player is tasked with defending their tower from waves of attacking enemies. Each level takes place in a different part of the kingdom, as the tower is mobile, and consists of multiple waves of attacks. Unlike most tower defense games, the gameplay takes place in a side-viewed tower with enemies marching through each of the tower's floors linearly, rather than through a top-down perspective of a circuitous route. The player places traps and combatants in the floors of the tower, which then cannot be removed. The level ends when the attackers have reached the Dark Crystal at the top of the tower, or when they have all been defeated.

Defeating enemies gives the player Negative Power, which can be spent in the level to place more obstacles, upgrade existing obstacles to more powerful ones, or build more floors onto the tower. Karma is earned for finishing levels, and can be spent between levels to increase the maximum size of the tower or the starting power of the units. The floors come in different varieties, and provide offensive, defensive, and supportive powers to the obstacles placed on them or the enemies walking on them. Each floor has an artifact, which if reached by the enemy is destroyed, in turn destroying all units and traps placed on that floor, removing any status effects the floor provided, and allowing the attackers to move onto the next layer. Traps and units are divided into melee, ranged, and magic categories, with the three types dealing extra damage to each other in a rock-paper-scissors manner.

Each level begins with all obstacles removed, and completing levels earns the player additional types of units and structures to build. The path that the player takes through the levels of the game is not linear; there are side paths that can earn the player additional Negative Power and units. If a level is failed, the player retains some of the Karma they had earned before being defeated. Despite being released for the Wii, there is no support for motion control with the Wii controller.

== Synopsis ==
My Life as a Darklord takes place in the direct aftermath of Final Fantasy Crystal Chronicles: My Life as a King, following the vanishing of Miasma from the world as depicted during the ending of the original Crystal Chronicles. The world is divided between the four allied races—Clavats, Lilties, Yukes and Selkies—and monsters that terrorised the world during the Miasma's existence. Following his defeat in My Life as a King, the original Darklord went to sleep within the Dark Crystal, allowing monsters to continue existing following the loss of Miasma. Upon her ascension, the Darklord's daughter Mira resolves to mount a campaign against the rest of the world. Over the course of her campaign, it is revealed that Mira's mother was one of the Clavat tribe, and the Darklord's wish was to create a bridge between monsters and the other tribes. After the final campaign against King Leo, protagonist of My Life as a King, Mira decides to forgo her plan for world domination and fulfil her father's wish of bringing coexistence between monsters and the other tribes.

== Development ==
The plot outline for My Life as a Darklord was in place during production of its predecessor My Life as a King. The original plan was it to be another city building game, but the team decided to make it more original. Production began in 2008. The initial design for the tower would have required fourteen unique floors, which would have been laborious to create. With the idea of artifacts, the team were able to impelement customisation, providing variety between floors without the additional workload. According to producer Hiroaki Iwano, testing and game balance was the most strenuous aspect of production. Scaling traditionally large or ungainly Final Fantasy monsters so they could fit inside the tower floors was also an issue.

The scenario director was Motomu Toriyama, who had previously worked on My Life as a King, and built the story around flipping the traditional protagonists of Final Fantasy being both righteous and humanoid. Similar to the subseries' recurring theme of family, Toriyama made the game's main theme the bond between Mira and her monster army. As the game was a sequel to My Life as a King, it was decided early on that characters from that game would appear. Director Hiroyuki Kaneko also decided to provide cameo appearances for characters from the original Crystal Chronicles. Rather than a professional voice cast, members of the development team provided voice clips for characters and monsters.

While monsters were the focus of both gameplay and narrative, the planned female lead led to a "cute" aesthetic being adopted, with a recurring visual motif being a heart symbol. The art design drew inspiration from the lolita gothic and punk fashion movements. The castle was designed around a number of key words including "beauty" and "glamour". The characters were designed by Yasuhisa Izumisawa, who had previously worked on My Life as a King. When designing Mira, Izumisawa went counter to common design tropes seen in anime and video games, creating an asymmetric visual design. This design was challenging for the modellers, who needed to create the entire model as a single unit rather than their usual method for asymmetrical characters of joining up two half-models.

=== Music ===
The music for My Life as a Darklord was composed by Kumi Tanioka, who had worked on previous entries in the Crystal Chronicles series. Due to its tonal difference from other entries, Tanioka wrote the score of My Life as a Darklord to reflect its protagonist and style of comedy, while retaining the established instrumentation. At the time, she was working on both My Life as a Darklord and Echoes of Time, meaning she could not contribute much to the next entry The Crystal Bearers. A digital soundtrack album was released on June 30, 2009 featuring music from both My Life as a Darklord and My Life as a King.

=== Release ===
My Life as a Darklord was revealed at the 2009 Game Developers Conference alongside fellow WiiWare title Final Fantasy IV: The After Years. It was also showcased at E3. The game was released internationally during 2009; in Japan on June 30, Europe on July 17, and North America on July 20. A free demo of the game was available on the Wiiware service from November 2009 to January 2010.

There is additional downloadable content for the game, such as new items or levels. At launch time there were 14 different DLC packs, with more added later. Initial DLC packets included two Mira costumes, three new monster types, two floor types, and three items for various amounts of WiiPoints. A DLC package included costumes, abilities, and characters from Final Fantasy IV: The After Years. The game became unavailable with the closing down of the WiiWare in 2018. Costumes themed after the characters of My Life as a Darklord will be released as DLC for Final Fantasy Crystal Chronicles: Remastered Edition.

== Reception ==
Reception

Aggregate score
| Aggregator | Score |
|---|---|
| Metacritic | 73/100 |

Review scores
| Publication | Score |
|---|---|
| Eurogamer | 7/10 |
| IGN | 8.1/10 |
| Nintendo Life | 8/10 |
| RPG Site | 7/10 |

My Life as a Darklord has received generally positive reviews, garnering a rating of 73 out of 100 on review aggregate site Metacritic based on 14 critic reviews. Daemon Hatfield of IGN called it "an amusing strategy game and a standout title on WiiWare", praising the gameplay and presentation while saying there were clear limitations due to its release platform. The website also named it the best WiiWare of the month for July 2009.

Dan Whitehead, writing for Eurogamer, praised the depth of the gameplay but complained that without purchasing any of the downloadable content the player has "little room to really dig deep into the tempting tactical depths that the concept so clearly offers". Nintendo Life's Sean McDermott lauded the gameplay depth created by the variety of units and replayability, but he disliked the types of DLC being released and noted that players would eventually feel repetition due to a lack of mission variety. Alex Donaldson of RPG Site faulted the high difficulty and the fact that the DLC releases seemed designed to exploit this, but otherwise enjoyed the game despite a lack of variety.
