= Paul Stanbridge =

English writer

Paul Stanbridge is an English writer. He grew up in Essex and studied literature at Reading University and Manchester University. He obtained his PhD from the University of East Anglia, writing his doctoral thesis on the war poet David Jones and his poem The Anathemata.

Stanbridge's first novel Forbidden Line (Galley Beggar Press, 2016) was named the best debut novel at the inaugural Republic of Consciousness Prize in 2017. The novel, set in contemporary Britain, is a fictional reworking of Don Quixote, featuring eccentric encyclopaedia writer Don Waswill and his helper Is. As they embark on a series of picaresque adventures, they gain followers, who believe the pair are reenacting the Peasants' Revolt.

His second book, My Mind to Me A Kingdom Is, is also published by Galley Beggar Press. It is a hybrid novel, mixing memoir, essay, and fiction, reflecting on the life and death of Stanbridge's brother, who took his own life in 2015. The book's title is from a poem by Edward Dyer.

Stanbridge cites W. G. Sebald, David Jones, Olga Tokarczuk and Alice Oswald among his literary influences.

== Works ==
- Stanbridge, Paul (2016). Forbidden line. Norwich: Galley Beggar Press. ISBN 9781910296714.
- Stanbridge, Paul (2022). My Mind To Me A Kingdom Is. La Vergne: Galley Beggar Press. ISBN 978-1913111267.
