= Marcia Douglas =

Jamaican-American poet and novelist

- Born: United Kingdom
- Education: Ohio State University (MFA); Binghamton University (PhD)
- Occupations: Novelist; poet; performer
- Website: marciadouglas.com

Marcia Douglas is a novelist, poet, and performer.

== Life and education ==
Douglas was born in the United Kingdom to Jamaican parents. Her family returned to Jamaica when Douglas was six, and she grew up in Kingston.

Douglas received an MFA in creative writing from Ohio State University and a Ph.D. in English from Binghamton University, where she studied African American/Caribbean literature and creative writing (fiction and poetry).

== Work ==
Douglas is the author of the novels Madam Fate (1999), Notes from a Writer's Book of Cures and Spells (2005), and The Marvellous Equations of the Dread: a Novel in Bass Riddim (2016), as well as the collection of poetry Electricity Comes to Cocoa Bottom (1999).

Her work has appeared in journals and anthologies internationally, including Edexcel Anthology for English Language/London Examinations IGCSE, The Oxford Book of Caribbean Verse, The Forward Book of Poetry, Sisters of Caliban: Contemporary Women Poets of the Caribbean, Cultural Activism: Poetic Voices, Political Voices, Kingston Noir, Jubilation! Poems Celebrating 50 Years of Jamaican Independence, Mojo: Conjure Stories, Whispers from Under the Cotton Tree Root: Caribbean Fabulist Fiction, Caribbean Erotic: Poetry, Prose, Essays, In This Breadfruit Kingdom: An Anthology of Jamaican Poetry, Queen's Case: A Collection of Contemporary Jamaican Short Stories, The Art of Friction: Where (Non) Fictions Come Together, and Home: An Imagined Landscape.

Douglas performs a one-woman show, Natural Herstory, which brings to life the strengths and struggles of women in contemporary Jamaica.

Her most recent novel, The Marvellous Equations of the Dread, has been praised by Vanity Fair as "a whirlwind of a novel that sways to an irresistible beat."

Douglas is a professor of Caribbean Literature and Creative Writing at the University of Colorado Boulder.

== Selected works ==
Novels

- Madam Fate. SoHo Press. 1999. ISBN 978-0704346284.
- Notes from a Writer’s Book of Cures and Spells. Peepal Tree Press. 2005. ISBN 978-1845230166.
- The Marvellous Equations of the Dread: a Novel in Bass Riddim. New Directions Publishing. 2018. ISBN 978-0811227865.

Poetry

- Electricity Comes to Cocoa Bottom. Peepal Tree Press. 1999. ISBN 978-1900715287.

== Awards ==
Douglas's awards include a National Endowment for the Arts Fellowship, a 2020 Creative Capital Award and a U.K. Poetry Book Society Recommendation. The Marvellous Equations of the Dread was long-listed for the 2016 Republic of Consciousness Prize and the 2017 OCM Bocas Prize for Caribbean Literature.
