= Sheyla Smanioto =

Brazilian writer (born 1990)

Sheyla Smanioto (born 1990) is a Brazilian writer. She was born in Diadema in São Paulo state and studied at Unicamp. She is best known for her novel Desesterro (2015) which won the Premio Jabuti among a host of other awards. Her second novel is titled Meu corpo ainda quente (2020). She has also published a poetry collection called Dentro e folha (2012) and a play called No Ponto Cego.

Desesterro was translated into English by Laura Garmeson and Sophie Lewis and published by Boiler House Press under the English title Out of Earth. The translation won the 2024 Republic of Consciousness Prize for Outstanding First Novel. In 2025, Out of Earth was longlisted for the International Dublin Literary Award.
