= Missouri Williams =

British author

- Born: 1992 (age 33–34)
- Occupation: Writer, Editor
- Writing career
- Years active: 2021-present
- Genres: Literary fiction, science fiction
- Notable work: The Doloriad (2022), The Vivisectors (2026)

Heather Williams, known by her pen name Missouri Williams, is an English novelist, playwright and editor based in Prague. She is the editor of Another Gaze, a feminist film journal, and her writing has appeared in outlets such as The Nation, The Baffler and Granta. While her work is commonly referred to as science fiction or speculative fiction, Williams has stated she wants "no part of that". Her second novel The Vivisectors was longlisted for the Booker Prize and the Goldsmiths Prize.

== Career ==
Williams wrote and directed the play King Lear with Sheep in 2015, a re-telling of King Lear with sheep as its primary performers.

Williams' debut novel, The Doloriad, was released in 2022 to mostly positive reviews. A literary fiction, science fiction, horror blend, the novel tells the story of "The Matriarch" ruling her family in the wake of an unknown cataclysm. The novel received the Republic of Consciousness Prize (2023) and her writing drew comparisons to writers such as William Faulkner and classical mythology. In an interview with TriQuarterly, Williams's style was compared to that of László Krasznahorkai. The novel was shortlisted for the First Novelist Award and named a Sunday Times and Vulture Book of the Year.

Also in 2022, she penned a personal essay in Granta detailing how a series of seizures in her temporal lobe impacted her writing. The cause of this condition is not publicly known. Disability, its impacts and how it relates to characters' worlds, has been cited as a key aspect of Williams' work.

Her second novel, The Vivisectors, is described as a satirical campus novel and is based on a previously published short-story in Astra magazine. The novel was subject to an eight-way publisher auction. In July 2026, the novel was longlisted for the Booker Prize and, in September 2026, the Goldsmiths Prize .

== Bibliography ==
- The Doloriad (Farrar, Straus and Giroux in US, Dead Ink Books in UK, 2022)
- The Vivisectors (Fourth Estate (imprint)) in UK, Farrar, Straus and Giroux in US, 2026)
