= Shola von Reinhold =

Scottish writer

- Born: Glasgow, Scotland
- Education: University of Glasgow; Central Saint Martins
- Years active: 2020–present

Shola von Reinhold is a Scottish writer. Her debut novel, LOTE (2020), was published by Jacaranda Books during the publisher's #Twentyin2020 campaign, an initiative to "publish 20 titles by 20 Black British writers in one year". LOTE won the Republic of Consciousness Prize and the James Tait Black Memorial Prize.

== Life and education ==
Shola von Reinhold was born in Glasgow. She completed a Creative Writing MLitt at Glasgow University, where she held a Jessica Yorke Writing Scholarship. She also studied fine art at Central Saint Martins in London.

Shola von Reinhold is Scottish-Nigerian and describes herself as Black, working-class and queer. Interviews and author biographies have used both "they" and "she" pronouns for von Reinhold, who has discussed the advantages of "indefiniteness" when assigning pronouns in her fiction. Her date of birth is sometimes given as 1892. She has said that she gives "lots of different ages" for herself and that such fictional and shifting autobiographies provide a "protective veil". She has also discussed how Black artists have been creative with their biographies as a means "of pleasure and survival".

== LOTE ==
LOTE's protagonist Mathilda Adaramola is a researcher in a London archive who sets out to recover "forgotten artistic and literary figures of the past", especially "Black, queer, trans, and/or femme figures". She calls these figures "Transfixions”. These "Transfixions" include both fictional and real figures. The real names include "1920s aesthete and socialite Stephen Tennant and the Bright Young Things", and Roberte Horth, an early 20th century writer from French Guiana who lived in Paris.

While sifting through an uncatalogued collection of photographs in the National Portrait Gallery archive, Mathilda encounters Hermia Druitt, a forgotten Black Scottish poet (invented by von Reinhold). This leads her to join an artist residency in the small European town of Dun, where she joins forces with other residents to "deep-dive" into Druitt and the associated cult of "the Luxuries". Mathilda's approach to understanding Druitt's life and work relates to processes of "literary recovery" practiced by "feminist scholars in the 1970s and 1980s who sought to correct the male biases of the British literary canon."

In the novel, decadence, glamour or luxury are forms of "resistance [...] an opposition to the Whiteness that has always told Black people that they are too ornamented", with the protagonists identifying how "this prejudice has its roots in colonialist contempt for African culture".

== Other work ==
In 2021, von Reinhard contributed an essay, 'The Scintillations Of Black Carnelian Grotto (the Individual) And Theire Journey To Black Carnelian Grotto (the Place)', to Peggy Ahwesh Vision Machines, a study of US artist and filmmaker Peggy Ahwesh.

In 2023, she contributed 'Collaboration x Commission' to Pippa Garner ACT Like You Know Me, a study of US artist Pippa Garner.

== Awards and honours ==
- 2021: Republic of Consciousness Prize
- 2021: James Tait Black Memorial Prize

== Selected bibliography ==
- LOTE, 2020
