= Isabel Waidner =

German-British novelist and academic (born 1974)

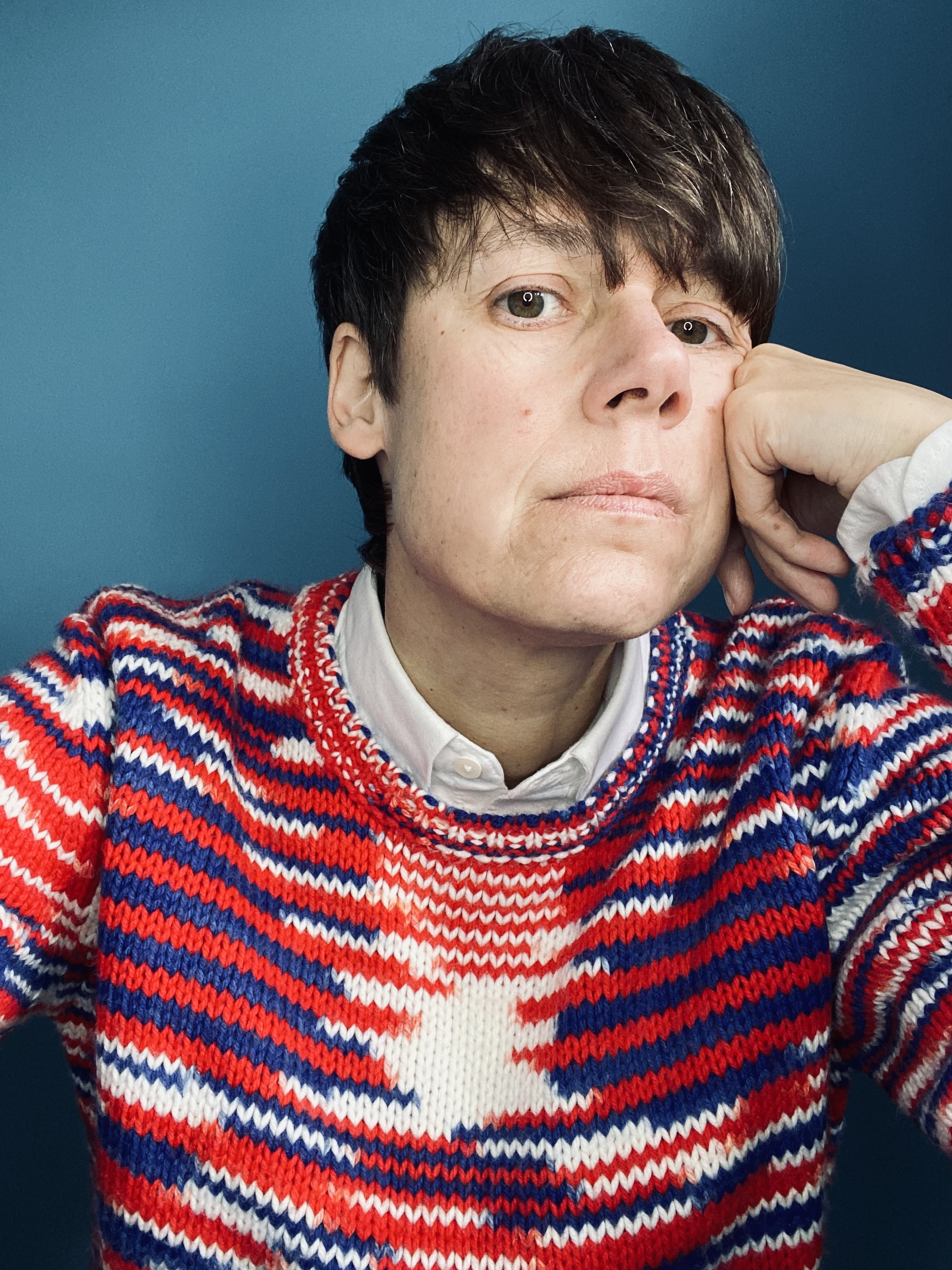
- Born: 14 February 1974 (age 52); Germany
- Education: University of Roehampton (PhD)
- Occupation: Novelist
- Writing career
- Language: English
- Notable awards: Internationaler Literaturpreis 2020 Gaudy Bauble; Goldsmiths Prize 2021 Sterling Karat Gold

Isabel Waidner (born 14 February 1974) is a German-British novelist and academic based in London, England.

== Early life ==
Waidner was born in the Black Forest region of Germany. They moved to East London in 1995 to be part of London's queer culture and community. After arriving in London, they worked at various minimum-wage jobs until they were awarded a scholarship for a PhD at the University of Roehampton in 2013. After receiving their doctorate, titled "Experimental fiction, transliteracy, and 'Gaudy Bauble': towards a queer avant-garde poetics", they taught creative writing at the University of Roehampton.

Waidner is nonbinary.

== Career ==
Waidner has written five novels: As If (2026, Hamish Hamilton), Corey Fah Does Social Mobility (2023, Hamish Hamilton), Sterling Karat Gold (2021, Peninsula Press), We are Made of Diamond Stuff (2019, Dostoyevsky Wannabe), and Gaudy Bauble (2017, Dostoyevsky Wannabe). We are Made of Diamond Stuff was nominated for the 2019 Goldsmiths Prize and Sterling Karat Gold won the 2021 Goldsmiths Prize. They are also the editor of the anthology Liberating the Canon: An Anthology of Innovative Literature (2018, Dostoyevsky Wannabe) and have written for numerous publications including Granta, Frieze, the Cambridge Literary Review, and AQNB.

Along with artist Richard Porter, Waidner is the co-founder of the Queers Read This, an event series hosted by the Institute of Contemporary Arts (ICA). They were the host and curator of the ICA's literary talk series, This Isn't a Dream, which was live-streamed fortnightly via Instagram Live between January and May 2021.

The German translation of Gaudy Bauble, translated by Ann Cotten, won the Internationaler Literaturpreis. Their first, second and third novels were shortlisted for the Republic of Consciousness Prize, in 2018, 2020 and 2022 respectively. Spurred by the Brexit referendum, they applied for British citizenship and became eligible for the Goldsmiths Prize. Waidner has written extensively about working-class queer and transgender people, nationalism, and how "the British novel tends to reproduce white, middle-class values and aesthetics", with their work standing in opposition to these motifs.

Between 2002 and 2004, Waidner performed as part of the indie band Klang, releasing records through the UK labels Rough Trade Records and Blast First.

They currently teach at Queen Mary University of London in the School of the Arts.

== Bibliography ==
- Gaudy Bauble. Dostoyevsky Wannabe. 2017. ISBN 9781999924522.
- Waidner, Isabel, ed. (2018). Liberating the Canon: an Anthology of Innovative Literature. Dostoyevsky Wannabe Experimental. ISBN 9781999924508.
- We Are Made of Diamond Stuff. Dostoyevsky Wannabe. 2019. ISBN 9781999924539.
- Sterling Karat Gold. Peninsula Press. 2021. ISBN 9781913512040.
- Corey Fah Does Social Mobility. Hamish Hamilton, Penguin. 2023. ISBN 9780241632536.
- As If. Hamish Hamilton, Penguin. 2026. ISBN 9780241779187.

== Awards ==
- 2018: Shortlisted for Republic of Consciousness Prize for Gaudy Bauble
- 2019: Shortlisted for Goldsmiths Prize for We are Made of Diamond Stuff
- 2020: Shortlisted for Republic of Consciousness Prize for We are Made of Diamond Stuff
- 2020: Winner of Internationaler Literaturpreis for Gaudy Bauble
- 2021: Winner of Goldsmiths Prize for Sterling Karat Gold
- 2022: Shortlisted for Republic of Consciousness Prize for Sterling Karat Gold
- 2022: Shortlisted for Orwell Prize for Political Fiction for Sterling Karat Gold
- 2024: Shortlisted for Arthur C. Clarke Award for Corey Fah Does Social Mobility
