= Jonas Eika =

Danish writer

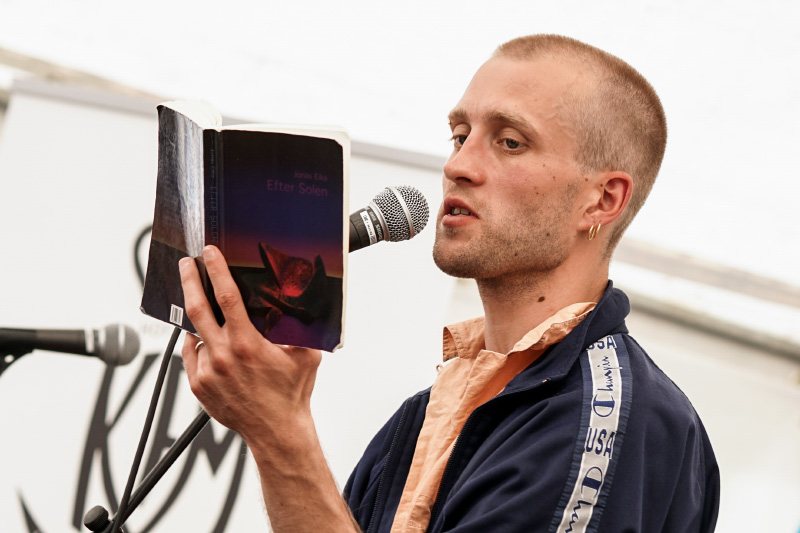
- Born: 1991 (age 34–35), Denmark
- Occupation: Writer
- Awards: Nordic Council Literature Prize (2019)

Jonas Eika Rasmussen (born 1991) is a Danish writer.

Eika made his literary debut in 2015, with the novel Lageret Huset Marie. His next book was the short story collection Efter Solen from 2018, for which they were awarded Michael Strunge-prisen, Den svære Toer, Montanas Litteraturpris and Blixenprisen. Eika was awarded the Nordic Council Literature Prize 2019 for Efter Solen. An English edition, translated by Sherilyn Nicolette Hellberg, After the Sun, was longlisted for the 2022 Republic of Consciousness Prize.
