= The Marvellous Equations of the Dread =

2018 novel by Marcia Douglas

First edition

The Marvellous Equations of the Dread: a Novel in Bass Riddim is a novel by Jamaican-American writer Marcia Douglas. Originally published through Peepal Tree Press in 2016, the novel was then published on July 31, 2018, through New Directions Publishing. The novel has been described as "experimental" or "prose poetry in novel form".

The novel adopts a "reggae aesthetic", exhibiting aspects of musicality from the intermixing of lyrics and songs into the text, to the "lyrical" language Douglas employs.

== Setting ==
The novel primarily takes place in Kingston, Jamaica, with particular focus on Half-Way Tree, a road intersection in Kingston characterized by a Victorian era clocktower. Some chapters and segments also take place in the "Dub-Side", which in the novel can be understood as the afterlife. Portions of the novel also take place in Xaymaca (Jamaica before its colonization by Spain); London, England; Miami, Florida (the place of Bob Marley's death).

== Plot ==
The novel's plot follows a non-linear collage-like structure in order to tell a full, multi-dimensional and multi-generational story of Jamaican resilience in the face of centuries' old colonial devastation. A large subplot of the novel surrounds Leenah, a Rasta woman who has a romantic relationship with Bob Marley. Leenah experiences and witnesses persisting many colonialism-driven violences bestowed upon Jamaicans.
