= Final Fantasy Crystal Chronicles: My Life as a King =

2008 video game

- Developer: Square Enix
- Publisher: Square Enix
- Director: Kenichiro Yuji
- Producer: Toshiro Tsuchida
- Designer: Kenichiro Yuji
- Artist: Yasuhisa Izumisawa
- Writers: Motomu Toriyama; Nanako Saitoh
- Composer: Kumi Tanioka
- Series: Final Fantasy (main); Crystal Chronicles (sub)
- Platform: Wii
- Release: JP: March 25, 2008; NA: May 12, 2008; PAL: May 20, 2008
- Genre: City-building
- Mode: Single-player

Final Fantasy Crystal Chronicles: My Life as a King (Note: Known in Japan as Chiisana Ōsama to Yakusoku no Kuni: Fainaru Fantajī Kurisutaru Kuronikuru (Japanese: 小さな王様と約束の国 ファイナルファンタジー・クリスタルクロニクル; lit. The Little King and the Promised Kingdom: Final Fantasy Crystal Chronicles)) is a video game developed for the WiiWare service of the Wii console by Square Enix. Square Enix decided to make a game for the WiiWare service that would be high profile, and it was decided that the game would be a simulation game and, later in development, a Final Fantasy title.

The game is a city-building game set in the world of the action RPG Final Fantasy Crystal Chronicles and is the third title in the series of the same name. Following the events of the first Crystal Chronicles game, the son of a king who lost his kingdom during that game establishes a new one and sets about creating a peaceful and prosperous land.

A WiiWare launch title in all regions, it was released on March 25, 2008, in Japan, May 12 in North America, and May 20 in Europe. Reviews of the game were generally favorable, and it has been seen as one of the most innovative games released on the WiiWare service. A follow-up, Final Fantasy Crystal Chronicles: My Life as a Darklord, was released in 2009, and is a tower defense game that was also met with positive reviews.

== Gameplay ==
My Life as a King takes place after the events of Final Fantasy Crystal Chronicles, in a remote area of the peaceful world where the miasma that ravaged the land has now cleared. As kingdoms rebuild, the new king of a realm somewhere, having lost his father's old realm to the Dark Lord, now tries to revive his kingdom through a mysterious power called "Architek" that he received from the crystal. The king pays for research for new items for his warriors to purchase and sends them out to purge the land of evil. The player is free to give the kingdom the name of their choice, with "Padarak" being the suggested default.

The game is a fantasy city-building simulator in which the player creates a kingdom from the ground up. Starting with a barren town consisting of a lone castle and a large power crystal, by using the crystal's power, the player can magically place a variety of buildings to populate the settlement and draw in residents. The game makes limited use of the Wiimote's motion-sensing abilities and can be played one-handed. Each "day" lasts approximately 10 minutes and players are given an increasing number of options about what to do that day as the game progresses. At the end of each day, adventurers return and the player reviews what was accomplished that day.

Players send other characters off to battle.

To continue using the crystal to build up the settlement, the player must accumulate elementite which must be obtained from the dungeons and caves that surround the town. Instead of gathering the crystals first hand, the game prompts the player to recruit young citizens to do so by posting tasks on a town bulletin board. These "adventurers" are paid via taxes the player collects from the residents of the town, as well as from treasures found during their quest. The player can follow their progress by reading message boards placed around town, as well as by talking to their penguin assistant, Pavlov.

The player must also tend to the needs of their residents by building amenities, such as a bakery to increase their morale, which increases the citizens' productivity and helps the kingdom develop. Other needs include weapons shops to better equip their adventurers. As the game advances and the number of quests increases for the player, their adventurers will be able to gain experience and new aspiring adventurers will also appear, asking to be recruited. Players are also rewarded for repeatedly talking to their citizens. My Life as a King also includes a New Game Plus feature, available upon completion of the storyline. It offers "hard" and "very hard" difficulty levels for subsequent playthroughs which retain the adventurers, with their statistics and equipment, from the previous playthrough.

=== Downloadable content ===
My Life as a King also features additional downloadable content including new costumes for the king and his assistant Chime, the addition of three different races to become employable warriors for quests, new quests which unlock new buildings, a jukebox, new adventurer names, a library to gain new warrior abilities, and "Infinity Spire", a new dungeon with unlimited challenges. The additional content was priced between 100 and 800 Wii Points. The downloadable content was first made available on April 1, 2008, and 8 items were initially offered. Users who purchased and downloaded the game before April 1 were able to download the update from the add-on software menu within the castle.

== Development ==
Square Enix wanted to be one of the first companies to make games for the WiiWare service to attract more attention to their game, as it was very different from other Final Fantasy games. One of the developers of Front Mission: Online, Kenichiro Yuji, was chosen as the games director. Several gameplay ideas were considered for the project, including making it an action role-playing game or a sandbox video game, but the developers were not fans of the sandbox genre and settled on making an action role-playing game. The game originated from the concept that the player should control a king, rather than the hero, in a manner "inverted" compared to the usual format. The battle system went through four revisions, much of which was discarded, before the final design was agreed upon. At first, it was thought that players would spend most of their time observing the action, but eventually features were added to encourage player engagement through various activities. Battle reports thus became one of the toughest challenges for the team, and went through several iterations to get right. The development team also found it difficult to write dialogue that would keep the game exciting without the player actually participating in or even witnessing the battles.

Not originally conceived as a Final Fantasy title, the game began from a prototype of Final Fantasy Crystal Chronicles to cut down on the projects costs. The game was linked to the Crystal Chronicles story through the game mechanic of summoning objects into existence through thought, a theme of the game series. Later in development, empire building and strategy genres influenced the gameplay, but effort was made to simplify that genre's usual high learning curve. Many features did not make it into the final game, including a "freeplay" mode with randomly generated dungeons every game, and an epilogue, which was removed for not fitting in with the finished game. The bakery was going to be replaced by a general store, but using a bakery was more appealing to the developers. Multiplayer was another feature the director was enthusiastic about, with ideas including a "kings tournament" where players competed against each other, and recruiting adventurers from other kingdoms, but was not included.

== Reception ==
Reception

Aggregate scores
Aggregator	Score
GameRankings	80%
Metacritic	80/100

Review scores
Publication	Score
1Up.com	B+
Edge	7/10
GamePro	4.5/5
GameSpot	5/10
IGN	7.5/10
Official Nintendo Magazine	88%
RPGFan	84/100
N-Europe	8/10
WiiWare World	9/10

Final Fantasy Crystal Chronicles: My Life as a King received a generally favorable response. IGN, reviewing the Japanese version of the game after its launch, was impressed with the quality and expansiveness of the game, saying that it was a "good start" to Nintendo's WiiWare download service. In a later review of the North American release, they cited disappointment at not being able to undertake quests, calling it "a Final Fantasy game where you stay at home and send other people out to play Final Fantasy", and felt that elements of the game were repetitive. However, they praised the presentation and felt the game could be "engaging if [the player] put enough time into it". 1UP.com compared the game to Animal Crossing but with a distinct RPG feel, and praised the game for its depth. Other reviewers felt it had a "plodding" pace, but had a soundtrack that is "quite good". Some wished the game ran in progressive scan mode, a deficit rectified in a later update.

The Official Nintendo Magazine praised it for being "incredibly deep" and "highly addictive'", but marked it down for being "slow and really niche". N-Europe praised the game for being "surprisingly deep" and said that it was worth its weight in points, despite the pricey downloadable content. WiiWare World was quoted as saying: "Of all the WiiWare titles to date, Final Fantasy Crystal Chronicles: My Life as a King is easily the most ambitious game on the Wii and cheap. The scope of the game is enormous and there's never a lack of things to do as you live out each day of the game's adventure".

However, while GameSpot thought the game had visual charm, they believed the game was in general "shallow, limiting, and padded with unrewarding gameplay", and felt constrained by their belief that much of the game's variety comes from the downloadable content. Wired's Chris Kohler also felt the pricing for the game's downloadable content was "exorbitant", with all available items at the time of review costing almost as much as the game itself to purchase.

The game was named the 21st best WiiWare game in 2011 by IGN. GamesRadar listed it as one of their "Top 7... Final Fantasy Spinoffs".

=== Legacy ===
On May 20, 2008, the web browser side game Final Fantasy Crystal Chronicles: My Life as a King - Everyone's Kingdom was launched on the North American Square Enix Members website. The game acts as a foil to My Life as a King, where the players are the citizens, encouraging the growth of the kingdom (seen practically as increasing house levels and unlocking features) and, eventually, fulfilling behests. A sequel to the game, Final Fantasy Crystal Chronicles: My Life as a Darklord, was released in 2009. Playing as Mira, the daughter of the predecessor's antagonist, players discourage the growth of the kingdom while keeping adventurers from taking siege of her tower.
