= Alex Pheby =

British author and academic

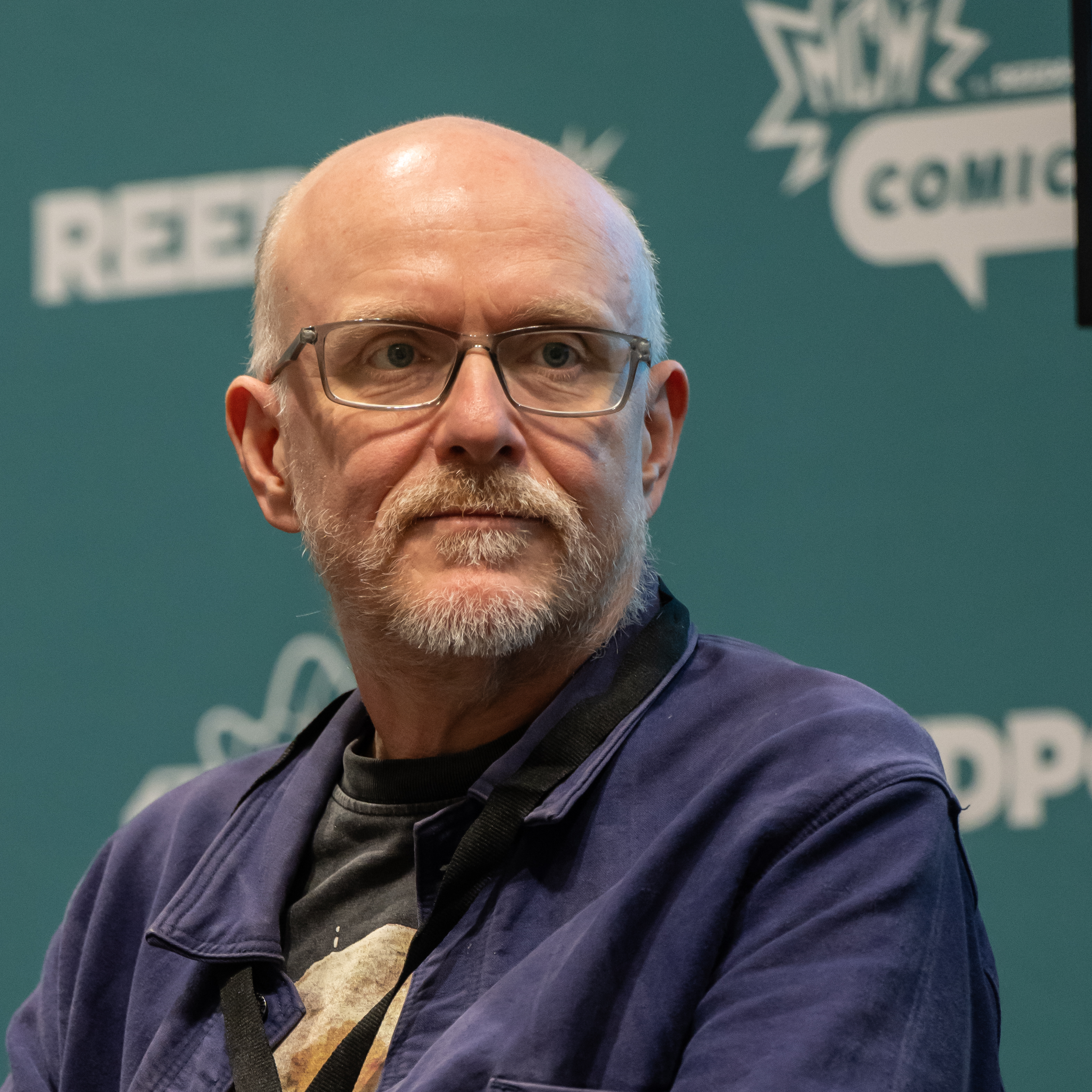
- At MCM London Comic Con, 25 October 2025
- Occupation: Novelist
- Writing career
- Genres: Literary fiction Medical fiction Fantasy fiction

Alex Pheby (born 1970) is a British author and academic. He is currently a professor at Newcastle University and lives in Scotland. He studied at Manchester University, Manchester Metropolitan University, Goldsmiths. and UEA.

== Career ==
Pheby's second novel, Playthings, was described as "the best neuro-novel ever written" in Literary Review. The novel deals with the true case of Daniel Paul Schreber, a 19th-century German judge affected by schizophrenia, who was committed to an asylum. In 2016, Playthings was shortlisted for the £30,000 Wellcome Book Prize. His third novel, Lucia, concerning the suspected schizophrenic daughter of James Joyce, released in 2018 was joint winner of the Republic of Consciousness Prize. He is also the author of Grace, published by Two Ravens Press.

Mordew, published in 2020 by Galley Beggar Press, is the first book in the Cities of the Weft trilogy of fantasy novels. Critics have praised the world building, the balance between "invention and familiarity", and described the novel as "dizzying". It was followed by Malarkoi in 2022 and Waterblack in 2025.

== Bibliography ==
- 2014: Afterimages of Schreber
- 2015: Playthings
- 2018: Lucia
- 2020: Mordew (Cities of the Weft #1)
- 2022: Malarkoi (Cities of the Weft #2)
- 2025: Waterblack (Cities of the Weft #3)
