= The Doloriad =

2022 novel by Missouri Williams

- Author: Missouri Williams
- Language: English
- Genres: Horror; Feminist literature; Science fiction
- Publisher: Dead Ink Books (UK); MCD x FSG (US)
- Publication date: 2022
- Publication place: United Kingdom
- Pages: 240
- ISBN: 9780374605094

The Doloriad is a 2022 novel by English novelist, playwright and editor Missouri Williams. The novel was Williams's debut novel.

It received the Republic of Consciousness Prize for 2022.

== Synopsis ==
A family live in a ruined hospital building outside Prague in the wake of an unspecified cataclysm that wiped out human civilisation. The family's leader, "The Matriarch" has incestuous sex with her brother to restore the human population, although she secretly harbours romantic feelings for him. The two and their offspring comprise all of the family.

After receiving a vision of another surviving family, The Matriarch sends her granddaughter Dolores into the woods, offering her as a bride. Dolores, being a child of second-generation inbreeding, has no legs and severe mental disabilities, and must be carried off in a wheelbarrow. Agathe, another grandchild who is victim to seizures and poor speech ability, secretly watches.

With Dolores left alone, the encampment returns to its routines. The children fetch "the schoolmaster", a legless man who lives in the ruined city and seemingly the only other survivor. The children attend his lessons each morning wherein he recites passages from old books before falling asleep in his chair. In the evening, the children gather around The Matriarch's television and watch a tape of a surreal program called "Get Aquinas In Here", where a disturbing dramatic scenario unfolds, only to be subsequently solved by Thomas Aquinas.

Dolores, frightened, finds her way back to the encampment by the morning. This troubles the family, who blame both Dolores for failing to please the 'others', and The Matriarch, who they believe has either compromised their safety, or was wrong about the vision. Jan, one of the older sons and the de-facto leader of their day-to-day lives, has grown frustrated with the lazy nature of his siblings. The return of Dolores and the Matriarchs weakening leadership pushes him over the edge, and he violently rapes Dolores, leaving her pregnant.

The situation unravels further with a poorly received speech from The Matriarch and the onset of a harsh heat that threatens the crops. Increasingly angry at The Matriarch, Jan impales his sister Marta and leaves her body in the city, where it is later found by the Schoolmaster. The Matriarch brings the schoolmaster into her office for questioning, which is eavesdropped by Jakub, one of the younger brothers. Jan notices this and begins to beat Jakub into unconsciousness, until he in turn has his legs broken by another of the brothers, Adam.

The remaining adults vanish from the encampment. Agathe sees visions of The Matriarch finding her way through secret tunnel systems where she has been stockpiling supplies. The schoolmaster retreats into a cocoon of old moth-infested fabric which he belives will transform him into a moth deity. Jakub becomes the tenuous leader of the family, and takes the unlikely Dolores as his companion.

Dolores' pregnancy progresses. Agathe, jealous of how the innocent Dolores is treated compared to herself, confronts her, but finds she cannot follow through with her anger. Instead, for the first time, Dolores speaks, and Agathe sees a vision of the future with her as the Matriarch and Dolores by her side.

== Background ==
The novel was developed out of Williams dealing with the aftermath of a series of temporal lobe seizures. Through attempting to regain focus of her communication through long, winding sentences, the style of The Doloriad emerged.

Williams states she did not intend necessarily to write a novel. She had previously published a number of short stories and essays in notable outlets such as Granta, The Baffler, and The New York Times.

== Style ==
Williams's novel has been described as horror fiction, science fiction, speculative fiction and literary fiction in various outlets. In an interview with Bookforum, she stated that while she has a love of science fiction, she "wants no part of that" with her own writing.

Williams's writing style has drawn positive comparisons to writers such as William Faulkner for its dense, lyrical quality, Cormac McCarthy for its Biblical and raw quality, Ottessa Moshfegh for its depravity and discomfort, and László Krasznahorkai for its surrealism and complexity.

More generally, some reviews have compared her style to the theatrical absurdity of Shakespeare

== Reception ==
The novel received generally positive reviews. Publishers Weekly noted that it would be a "love it or hate it" kind of novel, but that Williams' lyrical and visceral prose makes for a captivating read.

Some reviewers, while praising the novel's overall effectiveness, expressed criticism of its sometimes oppressive language style. In Kirkus, they said: "This novel awes on the sentence level but ultimately bludgeons the reader with the brutality of its larger vision."

The Doloriad was included in the end of year "Best Books" lists for the Sunday Times and Vulture. It was shortlisted for the First Novelist Award by Virginia Commonwealth University.

== See also ==
- Apocalyptic and post-apocalyptic fiction
- Feminist literature
