= Eley Williams =

British writer

Eley Williams FRSL
- Born: Eleanor Williams
- Education: Selwyn College, Cambridge
- Occupation: Writer
- Spouse: Nell Stevens
- Writing career
- Language: English
- Notable awards: James Tait Black Memorial Prize (2017); Republic of Consciousness Prize (2018); Betty Trask Award (2021)

Eleanor Williams FRSL is a British writer. Her debut collection of prose, Attrib. and Other Stories (Influx Press, 2017), was awarded the 2018 Republic of Consciousness Prize and the 2017 James Tait Black Memorial Prize. Her writing has also been anthologised in The Penguin Book of the Contemporary British Short Story (Penguin Classics, 2018), Liberating the Canon (Dostoevsky Wannabe, 2018) and Not Here: A Queer Anthology of Loneliness (Pilot Press, 2017).

Williams is an alumna of the MacDowell Workshop and a Fellow of the Royal Society of Literature. She taught at Royal Holloway, University of London, and supervises Jungftak, a journal for contemporary prose poetry.

Her first novel, The Liar's Dictionary, was published in 2020, described in The Guardian as a "virtuoso performance full of charm... a glorious novel – a perfectly crafted investigation of our ability to define words and their power to define us." Stuart Kelly in a review in The Spectator wrote of the book: "It deals with love as something which cannot be put into words, and dare not speak its name (done neither stridently nor sentimentally). It is, in short, a delight."

Williams's stories "Moderate to Poor, Occasionally Good" (2018) and "Moonlighting" (2019) have been broadcast on BBC Radio 4 under the Short Works strand, and her story "Scrimshaw" was a finalist for the 2020 BBC National Short Story Award. A 10-part radio series Gambits, based around the theme of chess, was broadcast on Radio 4 beginning in November 2021.

== Early and personal life ==
Williams' given name is Eleanor; the unusual spelling of Eley came from school. She grew up with two sisters. Williams graduated from Selwyn College, Cambridge. She lives in West Oxfordshire with her wife Nell Stevens.

== Awards and honours ==
In 2017, Williams received the Society of Authors's Writing Grant, and in 2018, she received a MacDowell Fellowship and Fellowship of Royal Society of Literature.

In 2023, Williams was named on the Granta Best of Young British Novelists list, compiled every 10 years since 1983, identifying the 20 most significant British novelists aged under 40.

Awards for Williams's writing
Year	Title	Award		Result	Ref.
2005	"Gravity"	Christopher Tower Poetry Prize	—	Won	
2017	Attrib. and Other Stories	James Tait Black Memorial Prize	—	Won	
2018	Attrib. and Other Stories	Dylan Thomas Prize	—	Longlisted	
2018	Attrib. and Other Stories	Republic of Consciousness Prize	—	Won	
2020	"Scrimshaw"	BBC National Short Story Award	—	Shortlisted	
2021	The Liar's Dictionary	Betty Trask Prize and Awards	Betty Trask Award	Won	
2021	The Liar's Dictionary	Desmond Elliott Prize	—	Shortlisted	
2025	Moderate to Poor, Occasionally Good	Dylan Thomas Prize	—	style="background: #FE9; color:black; vertical-align: middle; text-align: center; " class="table-no2"|Shortlisted	

== Selected bibliography ==
=== Novel ===
- The Liar's Dictionary (2020)

=== Collections ===
- Attrib. and Other Stories (2017)
- Frit, poetry pamphlet (2017)
- Moderate to Poor, Occasionally Good (2024)

=== Short stories and essays ===
- "In pursuit of the swan at Brentford Ait", essay in An Unreliable Guide to London, edited by Kit Caless and Gary Budden (2016)
- "Of Père Lachaise, On Business", in We'll Never Have Paris, edited by Andrew Gallix (2019)
- "To Plot, Plan, Redress", on the Rebecca Riots 1839, in Resist: Stories of Uprising (2019)
- "Scrimshaw", story anthologised in Still Worlds Turning (2019)

== External ==
- Eley Williams on Goodreads
- Eley Williams The Books of My Life at The Guardian
- Profile at C&W
- Profile at Profession Writing Academy
- Profile at Penguin Random House
- Profile at Granta
