= Cities of the Weft =

Series of fantasy novels by Alex Pheby

- Mordew (2020); Malarkoi (2022); Waterblack (2025)
- Author: Alex Pheby
- Country: United Kingdom
- Language: English
- Genre: Fantasy
- Publisher: Galley Beggar Press
- Published: 13 August 2020 – 6 February 2025
- No. of books: 3

The Cities of the Weft trilogy is a series of fantasy novels by Alex Pheby. The series is set in a world where the fabric of reality is woven from a material called "weft". The first book, Mordew, was published in 2020, followed by Malarkoi in 2022, and the final book, Waterblack, in 2025.

== Premise ==
The Cities of the Weft trilogy is set in a fictional world divided up into an archipelago of cities; each city is ruled by a different powerful Master or Mistresses.

== Synopsis ==
=== Mordew ===
Nathan Treeves, a resident of the city of Mordew, finds he has special powers which rival those of the master of the city.

== Reception ==
Writing for Typebar Magazine, Simon McNeil described the trilogy as "revealing the dark heart of the fantasy genre." Writing for the Los Angeles Review of Books, Alexandra Marraccini praised Mordew as a departure from other books of "British import literary fantasy".

The first novel, Mordew, received mostly positive reviews from critics. In a review for The Guardian, Adam Roberts referred to it as "a darkly brilliant novel, extraordinary, absorbing and dream-haunting." Mordew's style and content have garnered comparisons to the works of Charles Dickens, as well as the Gormenghast series by Mervyn Peake. Reviewers have likened it to the works of Ursula K. Le Guin, Terry Pratchett, and China Miéville. Mordew was included on The Guardian's and Tor.com's lists of the best science fiction and fantasy books of 2020. It was also selected as a Book of the Year by The Guardian, The I, Tor.com and Locus.
