= Einhänder =

1997 video game

- North American version cover art
- Developer: Square
- Publishers: JP: Square; NA: Sony Computer Entertainment
- Director: Tatsuo Fujii
- Producer: Yusuke Hirata
- Composer: Kenichiro Fukui
- Platform: PlayStation
- Release: JP: November 20, 1997; NA: May 5, 1998
- Genre: Scrolling shooter
- Mode: Single-player

Einhänder (Note: Einhänder (アインハンダー, Ainhandā)) is a 1997 scrolling shooter video game developed and published by Square for the PlayStation. It was released in Japan on November 20, 1997, and in North America on May 5, 1998, by Sony Computer Entertainment. It was also re-released for the Japanese PlayStation Network on June 25, 2008. The name Einhänder is German and denotes a type of sword that is wielded with one hand, here used to refer to the single manipulator arm possessed by the player's spacecraft.

The game is based on the story of the Greek's mythology of Selene and Endymion and set in a fictional future during a war between the Earth and the Moon. The player is part of the Moon's forces and must invade enemy territories to gather reconnaissance and enemy weapons. The music of the game, mainly in a techno/trance style, was composed by Kenichiro Fukui and was published in Japan as a soundtrack album. The game received positive reviews from critics, who praised its gameplay and graphics, but felt the game's short duration and lack of two-player mode were minor flaws.

== Gameplay ==
A screenshot of the game's interface. The graphics are in 3D, but player's movements are restricted to up, down, left and right.

Einhänder is a shoot 'em up game of the scrolling shooter subgenre in the tradition of games like Gradius, in which the player controls a fighter spacecraft that must destroy enemy craft in side-scrolling levels. The game's graphics are in 2.5D, that is, in 3D with occasional shifting of camera angles, but with the player's movement restricted to a two-dimensional plane. Pre-rendered full motion videos are used to illustrate pivotal scenes between stages.

The player can choose between multiple difficulty settings and three different models of the "Einhänder" fighter, in addition to two secret ones. The Japanese version also features a difficulty setting called "Free", which grants unlimited continues but disables the score. The player's fighter can move at different speeds and is equipped with a default machine gun as well as a manipulator arm, which is used to collect gunpods left by destroyed enemies. Gunpods have varying amounts of power, ammunition and range, and include cannons, guided missile launchers, aircraft-sized lightsabers and other types of weapons. Gunpods depleted of ammunition are discarded. They can be switched between an overhead and below-the-belly position, causing them to fire at different angles or directions. Most stages have a middle boss and an end boss, which often possess a main core and individual parts that can be destroyed.

The game's score system is based on a multiplier bar and a hit gauge counter. As the player destroys enemy cores, the hit counter increases. Points awarded for destroyed cores are multiplied by the value of the hit counter. The counter decreases when the player stops destroying cores. However, if the multiplier reaches a certain amount it will begin to flash, awarding large point bonuses for any cores destroyed during this short period of time.

== Plot ==
Einhänder takes place in a fictional future during a war between the Earth colony, Sodom and the Moon colony, Selene. The "First Moon War" resulted in the destruction of most of the Earth's surface and the creation of a totalitarian regime on the planet. The game recounts the events of the "Second Moon War" in which the Moon attacks the Earth again for natural resources. Selene's tactics consists of sending one-man fighter spacecraft called "Einhänder" on kamikaze missions to cause as much damage as possible on the planet before being destroyed. The player takes on the role of one of these pilots attacking the Earth capital city.

As the player progresses through the game, the Selenean military satellite Hyperion relays command orders and objectives. The on-board central computer "EOS" synthesizes orders. EOS also records and relays the player's flight and battle record data back to Hyperion. After completion of the last objective Hyperion informs the player that the battle pattern of the latest EOS unmanned fighter is complete. The player is given the honor of being the target of the last EOS test as reward for their heroic efforts. Upon the player's death they will advance two classes and be awarded the Sirius decoration. After surviving the intense barrage of artillery fire of the test, the pilot wonders why they must be terminated by their allies and questions their military leaders' rationale for the war.

The game's narrative then skips to one month later when the pilot re-emerges in space flying an armed Einhänder spacecraft. Hyperion communicates that the player is committing an act of treason and must remove their armament and surrender. Still, the player fights their way through the Selenean fighters and faces the Hyperion, the game's final boss. The ending sequence depicts the player's spacecraft damaged and drifting in space. The pilot engages its thrusters and dives into an army of Selenean spacecraft with the Moon in the background. An epilogue shows the actions of the lone Einhänder pilot ended the war by destroying the armies of both sides — leading to an eventual peace. Yet, the pilot's name and deeds were stricken from the records and they are remembered only by veterans of the war. In a post-credits scene, a lone Einhänder spacecraft is shown powering up.

== Development ==
Einhänder was the first 3D shooter developed by Square, a company otherwise mostly known for their role-playing video games. It was directed by Tatsuo Fujii, who had previously worked at Konami as a programmer on shooters such as Gradius II and Xexex. The developers used German terms extensively for naming things in the game, in addition to a number of references from Greek mythology and the Bible. According to the gaming website IGN, a lot of the effects Square learned from creating Final Fantasy VII were also put in use in Einhänder. The game was showcased at the Tokyo Game Show in September 1997 and was initially planned for a Japanese release on October 16, 1997. Square released an unrelated game the following month, Chocobo no Fushigina Dungeon, which came with a bonus "Mysterious Data Disc" featuring memory card data for various Square games, including Einhänder.

American publisher Working Designs was interested in publishing the game in North America for its Spaz brand of shoot 'em ups, but could not as Sony Computer Entertainment had a partnership at the time; it was the sixth and final game in Sony's deal to publish Square's games, with Einhänder replacing Tobal 2 in this position. For the North American version, the speed of the arm switching was increased and some power-ups were altered; the game mode called "Free" was removed; and the Gallery was given a modified interface and different pictures than those from the Japanese version. The game was not released in Europe. On June 25, 2008, Square Enix re-released the game as a digital download on the Japanese PlayStation Network.

=== Music ===
"Badlands"
23-second sample from "Badlands"

The music of Einhänder was composed, arranged, and produced by Kenichiro Fukui. Several tracks make use of genres of electronic music, such as progressive house, or other genres like hip hop, piano-based music or opera. The soundtrack of the game was published in Japan by DigiCube, a subsidiary of Square, on December 21, 1997, and was reissued by Square Enix on July 18, 2007, after DigiCube's bankruptcy. The final track, titled "Beginning", was also featured on Square Enix Music Compilation 2, a compilation album published on May 1, 2008, for members of the Japanese Square Enix website.

=== Related media ===
A 111-page official strategy guide, titled Einhänder Official Guidebook, (Note: Einhander Official Guidebook (アインハンダー公式ガイドブック, Ainhandā Kōshiki Gaidobukku)) was published in Japan by ASCII Corporation in December 1997. Its content includes stage maps, information on the spacecraft and data tables.

The development team behind Einhänder worked on the Gummi Ship portions for Kingdom Hearts III. In a similar vein as with Final Fantasy and The World Ends with You in previous Kingdom Hearts games, Einhänder is represented in Kingdom Hearts III in the form of the Endymion being a Gummi Ship and Schwarzgeist being a secret boss in the Gummi Ship portions of the game along with a remix of the latter's theme.

== Reception ==
Reception

Aggregate score
Aggregator	Score
Metacritic	89/100

Review scores
Publication	Score
AllGame	4/5
CNET Gamecenter	8/10
Edge	8/10
Electronic Gaming Monthly	9.25/10
Famitsu	31/40
Game Informer	8/10
GameSpot	7.9/10
IGN	9/10
Next Generation	4/5
Official U.S. PlayStation Magazine	4.5/5
Dengeki PlayStation	85/100, 80/100, 80/100, 90/100

Einhänder received "generally favorable reviews", according to the review aggregation website Metacritic.

American gaming publications stated that the game was especially notable for a shoot 'em up as it had no strong competitor on the PlayStation at the time of its release. The website AllGame referred to the game as the best side scrolling shooter "to come out in the post 16-bit era of video gaming", while Eurogamer called it "the most successful of Square's expeditions into non-RPG territory". Next Generation said in a contemporary review that it "makes no effort to be anything more than a traditional shooter, with the addition of 3D backgrounds and enemies, but waiting to see what's next is a rewarding experience, as any game should be. It's a welcome challenge for those gamers dying to play a good shooter; and hopefully, Einhander can inject some life into a moribund genre." All four members of the review team for Electronic Gaming Monthly (EGM) regarded Einhänder as far superior to any recent shoot 'em up, and Kraig Kujawa went so far as to call it "the best shooter ever".

The gameplay was praised by critics. EGM was most impressed with the challenging enemy AI, finding that enemies would cooperate with each other to herd the player into obstacles or weapons fire. AllGame lauded the intense action and diversity of spacecraft, the gun pod system and the fact that bosses are composed of different destructible parts. GamePro stated that while the gameplay scheme is common among shoot 'em ups, the "thumb-busting action" and variety of weaponry made for an enjoyable experience. They called diversity "one of the game's biggest assets". (Note: GamePro gave the game two 4.5/5 scores for graphics and fun factor, and two 5/5 scores for sound and control.) GameSpot further called the gameplay mechanics "finely tuned" and the plot "fascinating", while IGN felt the tilting camera angles were one of the features that make the game "so exciting".

A battle against Gecko, one of the game's large bosses

Concerning the graphics, GameSpot, AllGame and Official U.S. PlayStation Magazine appreciated the level of details and effects used in the different stages, as well as the large size of the bosses. Kujawa said, "Einhänder's 3D aesthetics are absolutely top-notch because it embraces, not abuses its polygonal graphics. The environments are stunning and the enemies are rendered to near-perfection." IGN opined that the 3D graphics look "substantially better" than that of most of the other, sprite-based, shoot 'em up games of the time.

The soundtrack was praised by reviewers such as EGM, Eurogamer, IGN, Soundtrack Central and Official U.S. PlayStation Magazine. GamePro said that the techno music and sound effects fit the stages "perfectly". However, GameSpot felt that the quality of the music and sound effects was "good" but globally not on par with that of the graphics. The game's short duration and lack of a two-player mode were cited as the game's only flaws by AllGame, GamePro, and John Ricciardi of EGM, though Ricciardi's co-reviewers Kraig Kujawa and Crispin Boyer both asserted that Einhänder is much longer than most shooters. GameSpot estimated that the game demands "just over an hour" to complete.

In Japan, Einhänder had sold 50,000 units three days after its release, and 100,000 units as of February 1999.

The game was a runner-up for the "Best Action Game" and "Best Graphics" awards at the 1998 OPM Editors' Awards, both of which went to Crash Bandicoot: Warped.

In 2007, IGN ranked it first in a top ten of the best 2D space shooters.
