= Final Fantasy Crystal Chronicles =

- Genres: Action role-playing, action-adventure, city-building, tower defense
- Developer: Square Enix (Note: First game developed by The Game Designers Studio, a now-defunct shell company for Square Enix (then Square Product Development Division 2).)
- Publisher: Square Enix (Note: First game published by Nintendo.)
- Creator: Akitoshi Kawazu
- Platforms: Android, iOS, GameCube, Nintendo DS, Nintendo Switch, PlayStation 4, Wii
- First release: Final Fantasy Crystal Chronicles; August 8, 2003
- Latest release: Final Fantasy Crystal Chronicles: Remastered Edition; August 27, 2020
- Parent series: Final Fantasy

Final Fantasy Crystal Chronicles (Note: Fainaru Fantajī Kurisutaru Kuronikuru (Japanese: ファイナルファンタジー クリスタルクロニクル)) is a series of video games within the Final Fantasy franchise developed by Square Enix. Beginning in 2003 with the game for the GameCube, the series has predominantly been released on Nintendo gaming hardware and covers multiple genres, including action role-playing. The Crystal Chronicles series takes place in an unnamed world inhabited by four tribes. Recurring themes include creating objects from memory and the importance of family. The gameplay, which has always been aimed at as wide an audience as possible within a genre, generally involves either multiple players or a large group working together.

Since its inception, the series has been supervised by Akitoshi Kawazu, known for his work on both the Final Fantasy and SaGa series. Recurring staff include composer Kumi Tanioka, who created the series's distinctive medieval-influenced music; Toshiyuki Itahana, who worked on the art design and directed The Crystal Bearers; and Yasuhisa Izumisawa, lead artist for Echoes of Time and the two titles released through the WiiWare service. Reception of the series as a whole has been positive, with many noting its experimental nature and the first game's unconventional multiplayer mechanics.

== Video games ==
Final Fantasy Crystal Chronicles series
2003	Final Fantasy Crystal Chronicles
2004
2005
2006
2007	Ring of Fates
2008	My Life as a King
2009	Echoes of Time
2009	My Life as a Darklord
2009	The Crystal Bearers

- Final Fantasy Crystal Chronicles is an action role-playing game released in 2003 in Japan and 2004 internationally for the GameCube. A remastered version with additional content was released in 2020 for the Nintendo Switch, PlayStation 4, Android and iOS. Taking place a millennium after a catastrophe clouds the world in a poisonous Miasma, the narrative follows a caravan travelling to collect myrrh, a substance to empower their village's protecting crystal.
- Final Fantasy Crystal Chronicles: Ring of Fates is an action role-playing game released in 2007 in Japan and 2008 internationally for the Nintendo DS. The narrative follows siblings Yuri and Chelinka who are forced to fight against an ancient evil that attacks their village.
- Final Fantasy Crystal Chronicles: My Life as a King is a city-building simulation game released in 2008 for the Wii as a launch title for the WiiWare service. Set in a distant land following the events of Crystal Chronicles, the story follows a young king rebuilding his kingdom.
- Final Fantasy Crystal Chronicles: Echoes of Time is an action role-playing game released worldwide in 2009 for the DS and Wii. The story follows a player-created protagonist as they go beyond their village in search of a cure for a friend's "crystal sickness".
- Final Fantasy Crystal Chronicles: My Life as a Darklord is a tower defense game released in 2009 for the Wii through the WiiWare service. A direct sequel to My Life as a King, the story follows the new Darklord Mira, daughter of the previous game's antagonist, as she seeks to conquer the land.
- Final Fantasy Crystal Chronicles: The Crystal Bearers is an action-adventure game released in 2009 in Japan and North America and 2010 in PAL territories for the Wii. Set a millennium after the events of Crystal Chronicles, the story follows Layle, a young man granted powers from a crystal embedded in his body.

== Common elements ==
While distinct in terms of gameplay and narrative, all titles share the same world inhabited by four tribes; the human-like Clavats, stocky Lilties, magic-wielding Yukes and nomadic Selkies. Two recurring themes within the world of Crystal Chronicles is objects generated from memories; and the importance of family. Crystals, a recurring concept within the Final Fantasy franchise, play key roles in multiple entries. There are also recurring Final Fantasy races such as the Chocobo and Moogle, and monsters like the Malborro and Bomb. Rather than arbitrary inclusions, these recurring elements are placed based on their in-game relevance and suitability.

The timeline begins with Ring of Fates, which is set thousands of years in the past when the four tribes lived together in harmony. At some point during this period, the events of Echoes of Time take place. My Life as a King is set after the clearing of the Miasma at the end of Crystal Chronicles, with the main character King Leo setting out to rebuild his kingdom. My Life as a Darklord takes place in the aftermath, with surviving monsters struggling to survive and ending up fighting against characters from both My Life as a King and Crystal Chronicles. The Crystal Bearers takes place 1000 years after the time of Crystal Chronicles, with the Yukes having vanished during a great war with the Lilties and crystal-based magic being a rarity.

The gameplay of Crystal Chronicles has tended to focus either on multiplayer, or the concept of groups working towards a common goal. A notable exception is The Crystal Bearers, which follows a single protagonist. A common aim across all titles is creating games that can be enjoyed by a wide audience. The original Crystal Chronicles notably made use of multiplayer relying on the GameCube linking with the Game Boy Advance (GBA) link cable. Both Ring of Fates and Echoes of Time revolve around dungeon exploration and loot collection, comparable to the gameplay of Diablo. My Life as a King focuses on city-building and construction, with the protagonist sending adventurers out on quests to gather materials and spread influence. My Life as a Darklord again focuses on a group, but this time within the tower defense genre and subverting narrative and stylistic tropes within the series. The Crystal Bearers broke away from many of the series' established gameplay mechanics; in addition to a focus on action-adventure and physics-based combat, there were also numerous minigames.

== Development ==
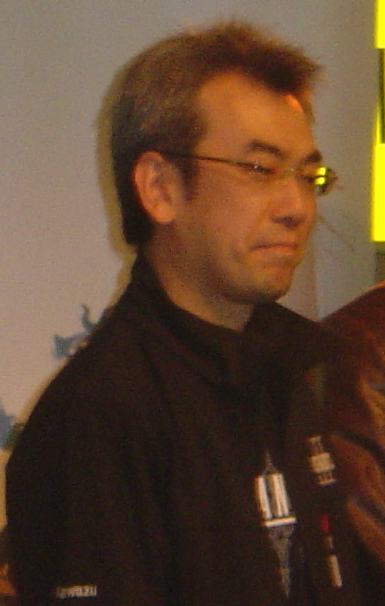
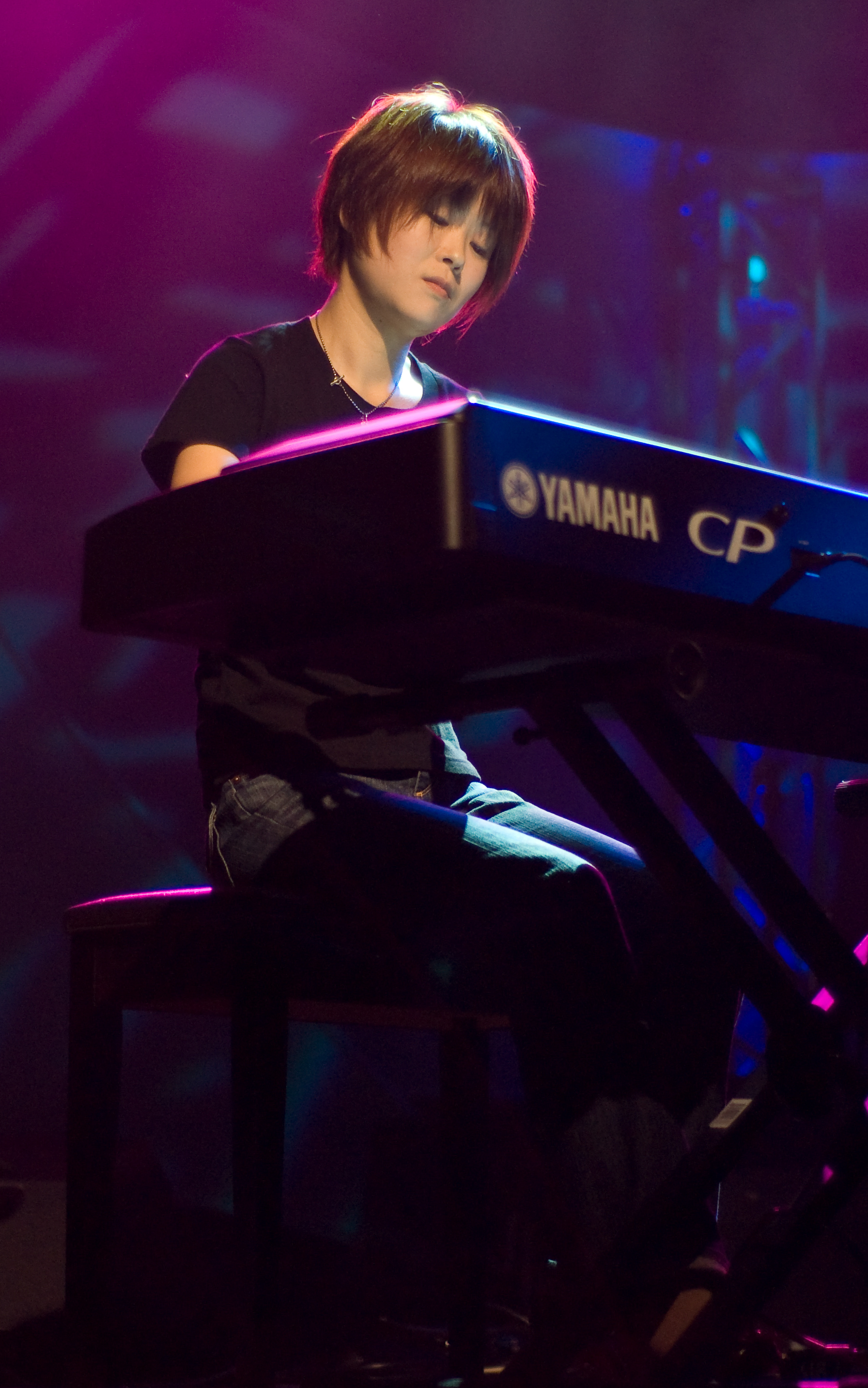
Series creator Akitoshi Kawazu and composer Kumi Tanioka; both have worked in some capacity on every entry in the series.

The first Crystal Chronicles title originated when Final Fantasy developer Square—who had previously parted on bad terms with Nintendo when they developed Final Fantasy VII for Sony's PlayStation console—were in a poor condition following the box office failure of Final Fantasy: The Spirits Within. They decided to make video games for Nintendo consoles again, founding a shell company of Square's Product Development Division 2 dubbed "The Game Designers Studio" so production could go ahead without interfering with other projects for Sony platforms. The shell company was co-owned by Square and Akitoshi Kawazu, creator of the SaGa series.

Due to the strong reception of Crystal Chronicles, Square Enix continued it as its own series, beginning work on Ring of Fates and The Crystal Bearers in early 2006. The two games were announced that year. Due to his commitment to the Crystal Chronicles series among other projects, Kawazu did not continue work on the SaGa franchise. From the original Crystal Chronicles to The Crystal Bearers, the series remained exclusive to Nintendo consoles. Kawazu explained this as being an act of loyalty to Nintendo, who had first requested a game for their consoles. The remastered version of Crystal Chronicles was spearheaded by later staff member Ryoma Araki, who had joined Square Enix after playing the game and wanted to revive it for a modern gaming audience. The remaster was done with Kawazu's input, and featured enough changes that half of the game had to be remade.

Many of the series staff were veterans of Final Fantasy IX, and the core team remained through the series' run. Kawazu had a creative role in each entry, mainly filling the role of executive producer. Kawazu also wrote the scenario for The Crystal Bearers. Both Ring of Fates and Echoes of Time were directed by Mitsuru Kamiyama and designed by Hiroyuki Saegusa. Crystal Chronicles and Ring of Fates had character designs by Toshiyuki Itahana, who had previously worked on Final Fantasy IX; he would go on to direct The Crystal Bearers. For Echoes of Time, My Life as a King and My Life as a Darklord, the characters were designed by Yasuhisa Izumisawa.

=== Music ===
The majority of series music has been composed by Kumi Tanioka, who had previously worked on the music of Final Fantasy XI. She returned to work on Ring of Fates, My Life as a King, then simultaneously on Echoes of Time and My Life as a Darklord. Because of the latter commitment, Tanioka was not greatly involved in the music of The Crystal Bearers, which was instead composed by Hidenori Iwasaki and Ryo Yamazaki. Tanioka returned for the Crystal Chronicles remaster alongside Iwasaki to both remix the original music and compose new tracks.

The music of the series is distinct from other Final Fantasy entries, making extensive use of medieval and Renaissance musical instruments. Those used for the first game include the recorder, the crumhorn and the lute. Her work on Echoes of Time was described by her as the most challenging project she had worked on at the time. Iwasaki and Yamazaki originally wanted to emulate Tanioka's style with their work on The Crystal Bearers, but Kawazu and Itahana persuaded them to change into an acoustic style inspired by American music.

== Reception ==
Aggregate review scores
Game	Metacritic
Crystal Chronicles	(NGC) 80/100 (NS/PS4) 62/100
Ring of Fates	77/100
My Life as a King	80/100
Echoes of Time	(DS) 75/100 (WII) 64/100
My Life as a Darklord	73/100
The Crystal Bearers	66/100

The original Crystal Chronicles reached high positions in sales charts upon release, going on to sell 1.3 million units worldwide. Ring of Fates sold nearly 700,000 units worldwide, while Echoes of Time sold 570,000. The Crystal Bearers met with low sales in Japan and North America, and was not mentioned in Square Enix's fiscal report for the year ending in 2010.

In a Final Fantasy series retrospective, Digital Spy noted it as one of the more successful spin-offs within the Final Fantasy franchise alongside Final Fantasy Tactics. Eurogamer's Rob Haines, in a retrospective on the first game, noted its unique multiplayer mechanics despite them not ageing well. He also felt that the series had lost some of its identity as it went on and aimed itself at mainstream gaming audiences. In a 2007 retrospective video series on the Final Fantasy franchise, GameTrailers noted that Crystal Chronicles stood out from the likes of SaGa and Mana, being a branch of the series while retaining a unique identity as opposed to spinning off into its own separate universe. In the preface to an interview with Kawazu, Imran Khan of Game Informer grouped the Crystal Chronicles series alongside Kawazu's other work as examples of his experimental approach to game design.
