= Quina (Final Fantasy) =

Quina Quen
- Final Fantasy character
- Quina in Dissidia Final Fantasy Opera Omnia.
- First game: Final Fantasy IX (2000)
- Designed by: Yoshitaka Amano; Toshiyuki Itahana

Quina Quen (クイナ・クゥエン, Kuina Kūen) is a character in the video game Final Fantasy IX, being one of the playable characters that can be used. They are a Blue Mage, a Final Fantasy class that gains enemies' powers by defeating them, and is invested in eating food. They have an ambiguous gender, referred to with both male and female pronouns in the English version of the game. They join the protagonist, Zidane Tribal, as part of their own quest to learn about life beyond food.

== Concept and creation ==
Quina was created for the 2000 video game Final Fantasy IX. They are a member of the Qu race, and have a food fixation. They have white skin, a long tongue, and wear a chef outfit. Quina has a tendency to look for food to enjoy in new area, and often serves as comic relief. The original concept art for Quina was created by Yoshitaka Amano, and the final version was created by Toshiyuki Itahana, as well as Shunkou Murase and Shin Nagasawa, who also handled the in-game version of the character. Their character design was meant to strike a balance between realism and a comic-like style, while taking inspiration from the style employed for the characters in the film The Dark Crystal.

Quina's pronoun usage varies from region to region. In the English version of the game, they use both male and female pronouns interchangeably, as well as s/he. In Japanese, they use the pronoun aitsu, which has no gender tied to it, meaning it can be translated as he, she, it, and that person. The Spanish and French versions use female pronouns for them.

== Appearances ==
In Final Fantasy IX, Quina is first seen working as a cook in Alexandria Castle. Zidane and the others later encounter Quina in Qu's Marsh, where they are trying to catch a frog. When Zidane catches a frog for them, the head Qu, Quale, calls Quina lazy, asking Zidane to take Quina with him so that they may find frogs elsewhere and improve their cooking skills. During the quest, they often split off in towns and cities so they may try out their culinary dishes. In Cleyra, during the attack by Black Mages, they opt to flee on foot instead of joining Zidane and the others on an airship due to their fear of heights. Cleyra is destroyed, and Quina is presumed dead.

Zidane later finds Quina back at Qu's Marsh, having survived. They then help the group progress in their quest while trying to find frogs. An optional scene can occur, where a marriage ceremony between Quina and Vivi, another party member. They are eventually left behind, appearing occasionally before permanently joining the party. Quina will later be able to visit Quan's Dwelling, where Quina hallucinates a feast, though becomes confused when it turns out there's no food. Quan's ghost appears, scolding Quale as an inferior gourmand to Quina due to Quale's lack of imagination. After the antagonists Kuja and Necron are defeated, Quina returns to serve as the cook at Alexandria Castle under Garnet's rule.

Quina received a figure in the Play Arts series, released alongside a figure of Eiko Carol.

== Reception ==
Quina has received generally positive reception, identified as the most original role-playing game character ever by IGN. Their sidelining was commented on, with IGN writer Dale Bashir feeling it was inevitable due to the cast's size. Destructoid writer Ashley Davis discussed the tendency of role-playing games to feature a character who is "cute as all get-out but useless in battle, annoying, or a combination of the two," noting that Quina is the character that made her write the article. She talked about how Final Fantasy IX "blew [her] away" due to its characters, world, and cinematics; yet, despite thinking they were the "most interesting creature I’d ever laid eyes upon in a game," she was ultimately disappointed with how one-dimensional Quina turned out to be. Hardcore Gamer writer Shawn Reynolds felt Quina served as comic relief, but also that they "represent the joy in life," feeling that Quina stands out among the cast.

Their gender has been the subject of discussion by critics and fans, the latter debating over Quina's gender. Fanbyte writers John Warren and Steven Strom were both disappointed with how Quina's gender was played for laughs, with Strom appreciating their lack of gender despite this. RPGamer writer Zach Welhouse identified them as one of their favorite characters in Final Fantasy, appreciating that Quina does not fit into the gender binary. Despite this criticism, Comic Book Resources writer Ryan Bamsey felt they were "surprisingly great non-binary representation," not believing that their gender was the butt of the joke. Writer Blythe Adams discussed how androgyny and non-binary representation tends to be depicted as “presented as variously humorous, pitiable, or monstrous, and often all three," with writer Lauren Lacey noting Quina as an example, calling them comic relief.
