= Freya Crescent =

- Final Fantasy character
- Freya in Dissidia Final Fantasy Opera Omnia
- First game: Final Fantasy IX (2000)
- Designed by: Yoshitaka Amano; Toshiyuki Itahana
- Voiced by: Ai Orikasa (Dissidia Final Fantasy Opera Omnia)

Freya Crescent (Japanese: フライヤ・クレセント, Hepburn: Furaiya Kuresento; /ˈfraɪə/) is a fictional character in the 2000 video game Final Fantasy IX, where she is one of the main characters. She is an anthropomorphic rat called a Burmecian and a Dragoon Knight. She is on a quest to find her lost love, Sir Fratley, only to discover that he has forgotten her due to amnesia. She also suffers from the destruction of different Burmecian cities. She was originally conceived by Yoshitaka Amano, before her final version was created by Toshiyuki Itahana.

She has received generally positive reception, considered a fan favorite character. However, the game's writers have been criticized for failing to develop her adequately, with a writer suggesting that the lack of development contributed to Freya being forgotten by fans. Her different experiences in the story, particularly her traumas and anxieties, were also met with critical commentary.

== Concept and creation ==
Freya was created for the 2000 video game Final Fantasy IX. She was initially known as Freija. She is a member of a race of anthropomorphic rats called Burmecians who mainly live in two cities, Burmecia and Cleyra. Her class is Dragon Knight. The original concept art for Freya was created by Yoshitaka Amano, and the final version was created by Toshiyuki Itahana, as well as Shūkō Murase and Shin Nagasawa, who also handled the in-game version of the character. Her character design was meant to strike a balance between realism and a comic-like style, while taking inspiration from the style employed for the characters in the film The Dark Crystal. 3D artist Francisco A. Cortina did concept work for Freya and other characters in the game. In the Japanese version of the game, Freya's dialogue is written in an archaic style from Edo-era Tokyo.

== Appearances ==
Freya appears in the video game Final Fantasy IX. She is originally from Burmecia, but when met in the game, she has not been home for years. When the man she loved, Sir Fratley, left on a mission, she eventually left home until she discovered what became of him. After a period in Lindblum, she headed out to wander the world. Freya returns to Lindblum to compete in the "Festival of the Hunt" around the same time that Zidane and Tantalus return from their mission to kidnap Princess Garnet.

Freya is reunited with Sir Fratley during Alexandria's attack on Cleyra. Her joy is cut short when he reveals that he has lost his memory and does not remember her at all. Freya is crestfallen, but when Fratley leaves again, she says nothing. She explains that she was just happy that he was alive. Freya ultimately follows Zidane on his journey. She is reunited with Fratley during the ending of the game in Burmecia. He has not regained his memories, but he falls back in love with Freya.

Freya also appears in Final Fantasy spinoffs, including Dissidia Final Fantasy Opera Omnia, Final Fantasy Record Keeper, and Final Fantasy Brave Exvius.

A figurine of Freya was released in a compilation with Beatrix in February 2020.

== Reception ==
Freya has received generally positive reception, regarded as a fan favorite by Keegan Lee of RPGFan and one of the best female warriors in Japanese role-playing games by game designer Robert Boyd. Houston Press writer Jef Rouner found her attractive due to her "tragic stoicism" and appearance, as well as one of his favorite characters in the game. Brittany Vincent of SyFy Wire felt that Freya needed "more time in the spotlight," begrudging her absence from the Dissidia series. Her lack of development in Final Fantasy IX was also criticized by Shaun Musgrave of TouchArcade and Nadia Oxford of USgamer. However, RPGamer writer Steven Toast felt she had good development, praising how her stronger side contrasts her softer, romantic side.

Inverse writer Robin Bea regarded her as the series' most underrated hero, calling her the "secret heart" of the game. She commented that her in-game story of trying to not be forgotten mirrored how fans have forgotten her, feeling that her being ignored in the game's story after Cleyra's destruction contributed to this. She found her anxieties about being forgotten relatable, regarding her reunion with Fratley as the most heartbreaking moment in the game. Paste Magazine writer Waverly discussed how characters in Final Fantasy process their trauma through joining the protagonist. They discussed Freya's motivations, namely "rage and sorrow of loss," particularly how she continues to fight for the world and show compassion for her friends in spite of her trauma. Dengeki Online writer Kawachi considered her his favorite female character in Final Fantasy IX, stating that, despite being a mouse, she was cool and beautiful. He expressed how painful it was to see Freya reunite with Fratley only for him to not remember her. Fanbyte writers John Warren and Steven Strom both identified Freya as one of their favorite characters from Final Fantasy IX. Strom found the idea of a rat being a noble knight interesting, while Warren commented that the Freya and the plot surrounding Burmecia were compelling. Warren noted that he had not gotten invested in characters in other series like he did with Freya, Vivi, and Garnet.

Her theme was discussed by Richard Walls and Julian Whitney of Video Game Music Online. Walls felt it was the "deepest musical portrait of any character" made by composer Nobuo Uematsu, discussing how it captured Freya's insecurities and solitude, yet progressed into being more heroic. Whitney found her theme felt melancholic and hopeful, and standing out among other songs due to Freya's "courage and perseverance".
