= Dissidia Duellum Final Fantasy =

2026 video game

- Developers: NHN PlayArt; Square Enix
- Publisher: Square Enix
- Producers: Naoya Matsumoto; Tetsuya Nomura
- Artists: Miki Yamashita; Tetsuya Nomura
- Composer: Takafumi Imamura
- Series: Final Fantasy
- Platforms: iOS, Android
- Release: March 24, 2026
- Genres: Action role-playing, fighting, gacha game
- Mode: Multi-player

Dissidia Duellum Final Fantasy (Note: Japanese: ディシディア デュエルム ファイナルファンタジー, Hepburn: Dishidia Dyuerumu Fainaru Fantajī) is a fighting game with action role-playing elements developed by NHN PlayArt and Square Enix who also published it. Dissidia Duellum is the fifth game published within the Dissidia sub series, and similar to other Dissidia games, it allows players to battle using a multitude of characters from the Final Fantasy series. It was released in North America, Europe, and Japan on March 24, 2026 for iOS and Android.

Upon launch, Dissidia Duellum reviewed mixed to positive reviews, with reviews praising the gameplay and combat mechanics, but criticizing the game's usage of a gacha system and how it effects the game's story mechanics.

== Gameplay ==
Similar to Dissidia Final Fantasy NT, Dissidia Duellum Final Fantasy revolves around two teams of three characters. The game is described as a "3vs3 Team Boss Battle Arena", where each team fights to see who can defeat the arena boss first through tasks such as purifying crystals for Bravery points, which are used to break through the arena boss's barrier and deal damage. Once the player has accumulated 9999 bravery points, their character can enter Bravery Burst. Players can only deal damage to the arena boss while their character's Bravery Burst is active.

=== Playable characters ===
At launch, Dissidia Duellum Final Fantasy initially featured a total of 10 playable characters upon launch, consisting of both new and returning heroes in the Dissidia Final Fantasy series. More characters continue to be added through constant patch updates. Each character is assigned one of four roles (Melee, Ranged, Agile, Support), and each character has their own special abilities obtainable through the draw system.

Players can obtain characters, character costumes, and magic abilities through Dissidia Duellum's draw system, which allows players to pull for characters, costumes, and magic abilities with in-game currency or tickets.

World	Characters
Final Fantasy	Warrior of Light
Final Fantasy II	Firion
Final Fantasy III	Onion Knight
Final Fantasy IV	Kain Highwind
Final Fantasy V	Bartz Klauser, Krile Mayer Baldesion
Final Fantasy VI	Terra Branford, Celes Chere
Final Fantasy VII	Cloud Strife, Sephiroth
Final Fantasy VIII	Rinoa Heartilly
Final Fantasy IX	Zidane Tribal, Kuja
Final Fantasy X	Rikku, Tidus
Final Fantasy XI	Iroha
Final Fantasy XII	Balthier
Final Fantasy XIII	Lightning
Final Fantasy XIV	Gaia, Y’shtola Rhul
Final Fantasy XV	Prompto Argentum
Final Fantasy XVI	Clive Rosfield

Note: List updated as of 27 October 2026
