= General Leo =

Fictional character in Final Fantasy VI

General Leo Christophe
- Final Fantasy character
- Artwork of Leo by Yoshitaka Amano for Final Fantasy VI
- First game: Final Fantasy VI (1994)
- Designed by: Yoshitaka Amano; Kazuko Shibuya
- Voiced by: Masashi Sugawara

Leo Cristophe (Japanese: レオ・クリストフ, Hepburn: Reo Kurisutofu) more commonly referred to as General Leo, is a character introduced in the 1994 role-playing video game Final Fantasy VI by Square Enix. An honorable soldier in the game's Gestahlian Empire that refused the magical energy infusion given to his compatriots, he appears in the first half of the game helping to ensure his Emperor's expansionist goals and is betrayed in the end. He has since appeared in other games related to the Final Fantasy franchise, including Dissidia Final Fantasy Opera Omnia, where he is voiced by Masashi Sugawara.

Despite being a temporarily playable character, Leo was well received for his characterization and charisma, with players trying to find ways to revive him or make him a fully playable character. He was additionally seen as a contrasting element to the game's final villain, Kefka, representing hope for a better world in light of the latter's representation of despair. His role as a catalyst for the story's progression has also been analyzed, and how it shaped both how Kefka was perceived but also the resolve of the protagonists to oppose the Empire. His appearance meanwhile has been read by the former staff of 1UP.com to be racially coded as a black person, and they considered him one of the first examples of a black character in the Final Fantasy franchise.

== Appearances ==
General Leo Christophe is introduced in the 1994 role-playing video game Final Fantasy VI. He is one of the three top generals of the game's antagonist Gestahlian Empire, the others being fellow characters Celes Chere and Kefka Palazzo. He has the unique ability Shock, which creates a large area of effect explosion. Unlike his compatriots, he refused to be infused with magical energy, and instead relies on his own talent. He is first seen at the Empire's siege of the kingdom of Doma. Not wanting to see men on either side needlessly killed, he refuses an all out attack against Doma. Kefka on the other hand sees this as weakness and argues with him, and when Leo is called back to the Empire on urgent business, Kefka poisons the kingdom's water supply, killing almost everyone inside and ending the conflict.

Later in the game he appears when the Empire offers peace to help find the home of the Espers, a race of magical beings. Attempting to atone for the Empire's past crimes against the protagonists, he joins with them as they travel to the town of Thamasa to open the gate to the Esper's domain. However, they discover it was a ruse by the Emperor, as Kefka and his soldiers arrive to capture the Espers for their magical energy and attack the town. Enraged, Leo attacks and defeats Kefka, only to discover it was an illusion as he is stabbed in the back by the real Kefka and killed. After the attack, the survivors bury his body, and the protagonists resolve to stop the Kefka and the Empire.

In other games, he appears as a playable character in both Final Fantasy Brave Exvius and Final Fantasy Record Keeper. He is additionally a playable character in Dissidia Final Fantasy Opera Omnia, where he is voiced by Masashi Sugawara. Set after the events of VI, he reflects on his death and past with the Empire, now that he has no ruler to follow. Outside of video games, cards representing Leo have been produced for the Final Fantasy Trading Card Game and Magic: The Gathering.

== Conception and design ==
Final Fantasy VI was developed with the mindset that none of the playable cast was the protagonist, and that each of them were equally the "main character". The cast of characters were selected from submissions from across the development team. Once the cast was selected, each individual would write their character's story, with Yoshinori Kitase balancing the plot as things developed. The character was originally intended to be a full party member, but the idea was cut during development.

Standing 188 centimetres (6 ft 2 in) tall, artist Yoshitaka Amano was commissioned to design the characters from the brief outlines provided. Given full creative freedom, Amano wanted to make "real" and "alive" characters, though with consideration for their representation in-game as small computer sprites. However, according to Sakaguchi and pixel artist Kazuko Shibuya, most of the characters were designed by Shibuya first as sprites. Though Shibuya acted as an intermediary between Amano and the development team, this resulted in discrepancies between Amano's concepts and the game itself. His appearance is as a tall, dark-skinned man with a yellow mohawk, prominent yellow lips, and a green military uniform with yellow and orange highlights.

== Critical reception ==
Since his debut, the character was positively received. Dengeki Online's Kawachi expressed how much he enjoyed Leo as a character, finding him very charismatic and expecting he would be a full party member in the game. However, Leo's sacrifice took him by surprise, and as much as he enjoyed using the character briefly, he felt it served as a powerful motivator for the game's story due to how it encouraged Terra and the other protagonists' resolve to overthrow the Empire. Meanwhile the staff of Futabanet Manga Plus, in a retrospective, cited him as one of the franchise's poignant examples of self-sacrifice. They further praised how much humanity his character demonstrated in the story, and how much it left a lasting impact on players. Leo's portrayal and role as a temporary party member lead to players trying to figure out how to revive him or make him a permanent companion, resulting in players trying to glitch the game to keep him alive and usable beyond the sequence.

In a podcast discussion examining the characters of Final Fantasy VI for RPGFan, journalist Michael Sollosi compared Leo's character to Kefka's, describing him as an "extremely likable soldier" trying to make the world a better place and atone for the Empire's actions, while Kefka revels in them. He saw Leo as representing a recurring theme of "hope" in Final Fantasy VI, in his context the hope for a better unified world. Through this scope, Kefka's killing of him in a brutal manner represented despair killing hope for Sollosi, elevating both his character but also the heroes as a last light of hope against Kefka. Fellow writer Alana Hagues liked his conflicted character of being honorable while serving the game's villain, and expressed confusion as to why the Empire would back Kefka over him in their ambitions. In later podcasts discussing the game, the staff of RPGFan further analyzed his character, noting that he was an important element of Terra accepting her nature, but also served as a more humanizing aspect of the Empire, giving some faith to the player that they may be able to reform.

Sebastian Deken in his book examining Final Fantasy VI and its themes cited Leo's death as a turning point in how players perceived Kefka as a character. While previously he was portrayed more comedic and bumbling personality, killing Leo made him "irredeemable", and any "comic relief or lighthearted mischief—or humanity—is excised" from Kefka's character afterwards. Most notability too Leo's death is the last use of Kefka's more melancholic theme, an aspect that Deken felt reflected the end of the comedic aspect and his character's shift to full villainy in the eyes of the audience.

Leo's appearance has also been of some discussion. Kawachi upon controlling the character and seeing his portrait admitted they were shocked, moreso than by his death. He had expected a more handsome character due to how Leo acted, and joked "you could say that it taught me that a man is not a face. A man's charm isn't his appearance!" Meanwhile, the former staff of 1UP.com in their Retronauts podcast read him to be racially coded as black due to his skin tone and prominent lips, which would have made him in their eyes one of the first instances of a black character in the Final Fantasy franchise.
