= Garnet (Final Fantasy) =

Fictional character in the Final Fantasy series

Garnet Til Alexandros XVII
- Final Fantasy character
- Garnet in Dissidia Final Fantasy Opera Omnia
- First game: Final Fantasy IX (2000)
- Designed by: Yoshitaka Amano (concept); Toshiyuki Itahana
- Voiced by: Mamiko Noto

Garnet Til Alexandros XVII, alias Dagger, is a character in the Final Fantasy series and one of the main cast of Final Fantasy IX. She is the princess of the kingdom of Alexandria and one of the lead characters. In this game, she is trying to escape her kingdom and joins with her kidnappers, including protagonist Zidane Tribal, to do so. She assumes the pseudonym Dagger and cuts her hair, at which point the writers began to treat her as a different character while writing her. In time, she discovers herself adopted, having come from a village of summoners.

Her original concept art was created by Yoshitaka Amano, while the final version was handled by Toshiyuki Itahana, as well as Shukou Murase and Shin Nagasawa, who handled the in-game version of the character. Her design was meant to strike a balance between realism and a comic-like style, taking inspiration from the characters in the film The Dark Crystal. She appears in multiple other Final Fantasy games, including Theatrhythm Final Fantasy, Final Fantasy Record Keeper, and Dissidia Final Fantasy: Opera Omnia. Garnet received praise from critics as a standout of Final Fantasy IX's cast, ranking highly as a female character in the Final Fantasy series. Her romantic and familial relationships have also been the subject of discussion from critics, both positively and negatively.

== Concept and creation ==
Garnet was created for the 2000 video game Final Fantasy IX. The original concept art for Garnet was created by Yoshitaka Amano, and the final version was created by Toshiyuki Itahana, as well as Shukou Murase and Shin Nagasawa, who also handled the in-game version of the character. Her character design was meant to strike a balance between realism and a comic-like style, while taking inspiration from the style employed for the characters in the film The Dark Crystal. Composer Nobuo Uematsu was asked to compose Garnet's theme song, among others.

At one point in the game, Garnet cuts her hair, a scene which event designer Kazuhiko Aoki felt was an important one in the story of Final Fantasy IX. He explains that it is a quiet moment among otherwise frenetic action and was important to the game's pacing. He was worried about how Garnet would be handled with this and told the writers that they would have to effectively write two Garnets, one with long hair and one with short. Event planner Nobuaki Komoto found this difficult, adding that players tended to have different images of Garnet in their heads. He felt that a person's thoughts on the character are reflected by which depiction they think of. While the development team referred to her as Dagger, the nickname she chooses to disguise her identity, most players still referred to her as Garnet. Garnet was first revealed in a Coca-Cola advertisement featuring other characters from FFIX.

== Appearances ==
Garnet cuts her hair at some point; this appearance was treated as "Dagger" by designers.

Garnet first appears in the video game Final Fantasy IX as one of its lead characters. She is a princess of Alexandria Castle, and the daughter of Queen Brahne. Protagonist Zidane Tribal and others come to kidnap her, and she reveals to them that she wants to be kidnapped for her own purposes. When her and her kidnappers' identities are revealed, the Queen orders her soldiers to attack the stage, but Garnet and her kidnappers are able to escape. Along with her and her kidnappers, a knight named Adelbert Steiner and a Black Mage named Vivi Ornitier join them. She is captured by a monster when their ship crash lands in a forest, from which the others help her escape. Garnet assumes a different identity and calls herself 'Dagger' after seeing Zidane's dagger.

She discovers the existence of a factory producing robotic Black Mages owned by Alexandria, which causes her distress. Garnet and her group escape to Lindblum, where Garnet speaks with the regent, Cid Fabool, whom she considers to be an uncle. She learns that Cid hired the kidnappers to take her to him. Despite being ordered by Cid to stay at the castle, she and Steiner sneak away so that she can confront Brahne. Zidane and Vivi join with them, and when they return to Alexandria, Brahne betrays her, having her eidolons — powerful creatures usable by Summoners — extracted from her. Brahne uses these to decimate other kingdoms along with a mysterious man named Kuja, before ordering Garnet killed. She is rescued by her allies, with the help of her kingdom's general, Beatrix. She is conflicted over her mother's behavior as well as the eidolons, of which she was not aware. The party intends to seek out Kuja, and on their path, Garnet and Zidane must participate in a wedding ceremony due to a location only allowing married couples to enter.

Garnet meets a girl named Eiko Carol, the last survivor of her summoners' village, and Garnet goes on to learn her true past, learning that Brahne was not her biological mother. Brahne tries to betray Kuja, but is fatally wounded in the process. Garnet encounters her, and Brahne apologizes for what she did, and asks for forgiveness, which she is granted. Garnet becomes the Queen and the party goes its separate ways, though shortly thereafter, Kuja attacks Alexandria with the eidolon Bahamut, and Garnet and Eiko work together to summon Alexander, which defeats Bahamut. However, a man named Garland decimates Alexandria, leaving Garnet mute from guilt and intense shock. The group pursues Kuja, and Garnet later returns to her mother's grave, where she breaks her silence to state that she will defend her kingdom, before cutting off her ponytail using Zidane's dagger. She and the party travel to the planet Terra to pursue Kuja, where they do battle with Garland and Kuja, who were working together, as well as the malicious being Necron. Zidane is lost as the rest return to their home planet, with Garnet returning home to rule. However, Zidane returns to Alexandria, and Garnet embraces him in tears.

Garnet appears in both the mobile version of Theatrhythm Final Fantasy and its sequel, Curtain Call. She also appears in the video games Final Fantasy: Record Keeper and Dissidia Final Fantasy Opera Omnia. A figurine of Garnet was released as part of Square Enix's Bring Arts line, sold as a pair along with Zidane.

Garnet's story arc is referenced in Final Fantasy XIV: Dawntrail through the character Sphene Alexandros XIV. Initially, players are introduced to Endless Sphene, also known as Queen Eternal, who serves as the expansion storyline's main antagonist. She is a digital copy of the real Sphene, who was believed to have succumbed to an illness caused by an imbalance of lightning aether four centuries prior, but was also programmed with a directive to keep the citizens of Alexandria happy at any cost by plundering other worlds of their aether to sustain other simulacra of deceased Alexandrians like herself, coming into conflict with the player's Warrior of Light who defeats her. Later story patches reveal that Endless Sphene was created to further the goals of the scientist Calyx, the overarching antagonist of Dawntrail and the main antagonist of its post-launch story. Players are also introduced to the real Sphene, who is revealed to be alive but was locked in cryostasis for four centuries, and was released following the death of her Endless copy with the Warrior's allies curing her of her illness. During the game's backstory and in the expansion story proper, Sphene undergoes much of the same beats of Garnet's character development, such as being forced to ascend her kingdom Alexandria's throne and her initial reluctance to do so, as well as gaining the strength and resolve to lead and protect her people in the process. Like Garnet, her appearance was designed by Toshiyuki Itahana, including her modern look being vaguely based on Garnet's white mage disguise in the introductory cutscene to Final Fantasy IX. Additionally, she carries a grimoire called Melodies of Life which she uses in battle.

== Reception ==
Since her appearance in Final Fantasy IX, Garnet has received generally positive reception. In a poll of fans of Final Fantasy, Garnet was ranked eighth on the list of greatest female Final Fantasy characters. USgamer found Garnet to be one of the best-written role-playing game characters. Jef Rouner of the Houston Press found her more likable than protagonist Zidane based on her more notable character arc, while Touch Arcade writer Shaun Musgrave found the story of the game at its strongest when Garnet or Vivi were the focus. Writer Daniella Lucas initially did not like Garnet, stating that she saw Garnet as just a damsel in distress. However, once Lucas acquired more life experience, she began to relate to her more, citing Garnet's struggles with her mother and guilt over what happened to Alexandria. Ashley Barry, writing for The Mary Sue, felt similarly; Barry grew up seeing Garnet as weak, due in part to her "traditional femininity", but discovered that they only thought this because they were raised to see femininity as weak. They noticed Garnet seeming happier when she had control of herself and defying the limitations put upon her.

The subject of Garnet's relationship with other characters has been a topic of discussion among critics. RPGSite writer Natalie Flores found Garnet's relationship with her mother intriguing, praising Brahne's passing and apology to Garnet as one of the series' most touching moments. Flores noted that it portrays a complex relationship, one that writers of later Final Fantasy titles should refer to when they portray motherhood. Writers Mikel Reparaz and Jason Wojnar of GamesRadar+ and Screen Rant respectively felt that the relationship between Garnet and Zidane was poor, with the former citing a lack of chemistry between the two characters as the cause. IGN writer Leah B. Jackson was more positive towards their relationship, finding the early premise that Garnet wanted to be kidnapped by Zidane intriguing. Author Sean Atkinson discussed her musical theme, "Melodies of Life", and how it is used to represent particular relationships, namely those with Zidane and Eiko. Atkinson noted that it combines two themes heard throughout the game which are important to Garnet, suggesting that the execution of the two component themes and the complete theme is meant to show that Garnet and Zidane are destined to be together.
