= Beatrix (Final Fantasy) =

- Final Fantasy character
- Beatrix in Dissidia Final Fantasy Opera Omnia
- First game: Final Fantasy IX (2000)
- Designed by: Hideo Minaba
- Voiced by: Yuka Komatsu

Beatrix is a fictional character in the 2000 video game Final Fantasy IX. She is one of its antagonists, serving Queen Brahne of the Alexandria Kingdom as Brahne invades various nations to steal crystal shards. Beatrix eventually betrays Brahne after the destruction of the nation of Cleyra and Brahne putting the life of the Princess, Garnet, at risk. She works with Steiner to battle against Brahne, and eventually falls in love with him. She has been a generally popular character among critics and fans, with her eventual turn away from Brahne and her power receiving commentary from critics.

== Concept and creation ==
Beatrix was created for the 2000 video game Final Fantasy IX as part of approximately 30 side characters. Her design was created by Hideo Minaba. Beatrix's design was made after a member of the team suggested the cast was lacking in attractive characters. She was also given an eyepatch to make her look more classy. Her character design was meant to strike a balance between realism and a comic-like style, while taking inspiration from the style employed for the characters in the film The Dark Crystal.

== Appearances ==
Beatrix appears in Final Fantasy IX. She grew up on a middle-class family in the city of Treno, and she later moves to Alexandria to join its military. She eventually ascended the ranks to general, becoming acquainted with Captain Adelbert Steiner. She loyally served Queen Brahne in her wars, though she eventually betrayed Brahne to help the protagonists, remaining behind with Steiner to allow them to rescue Garnet Til Alexandros XVII, the kingdom's Princess, and escape. Following the Queen's death, Beatrix serves under the newly crowned Garnet. She eventually has a romance with Steiner due to a comedy of errors.

She and Steiner defended the city against an attack from a villain named Kuja, but went missing during the chaos. She is later discovered alive in Alexandria, having helped to rebuild the city. She pilots the airship Red Rose in order to protect the protagonists as they enter Memoria, the final area of the game. After the antagonist Necron is defeated, she intends to renounce her position, but Steiner convinces her to stay and help protect Garnet, which leads to them entering a formal relationship.

She received a figurine bundled with one of Freya Crescent from the Square Enix Figure Line series, released in February 2020.

Beatrix is referenced in Final Fantasy XIV: Dawntrail in Patch 7.2 Seekers of Eternity. While she isn't mentioned by name, a trial boss by the name of Zelenia is encountered by the player. A robot, Zelenia retains the memories of the original incarnation of the Alexandrian knight that died 400 years prior to the game's current day plot. She has visual similarities including the eye patch and outfit, and uses various rose themed attacks. When fought, a remix of Roses of May, her theme in the original Final Fantasy IX, plays.

== Reception ==
Beatrix's character has received very positive critical reception, having been popular among Japanese Final Fantasy fans. She ranked highly as a Final Fantasy character, both in general and as a woman. A point of criticism for Final Fantasy IX by Screen Rant writer Scott Baird and Hobby Consolas writer Mario V. Marco was that she was not a member of the main cast, Baird suggesting she was a better fit for the main cast than Amarant Coral. She was requested to appear in a Dissidia Final Fantasy game by multiple critics, including those from VG247, TechRaptor, and RPGSite. Dengeki author Kawachi felt similarly, expressing his joy that she was ultimately included in Final Fantasy Record Keeper. Shack News writer TJ Denzer discussed how, despite being as powerful as she is and working for the villains, the fact that she is not herself a bad person made her more interesting. Despite her actions, he felt she was not bad at heart, merely in the mindset of devotion to her queen and kingdom. He felt that her shift from enemy to ally was more palpable because of this, and her story with Steiner paid off well in the end, ultimately making her a standout character in the cast.

RPGFan writer Michael Sollosi highlighted Beatrix as a great female character in role-playing games. He noted that while he enjoyed how badass she was, as well as her conflict over Brahne's actions, he felt her "capacity for love," reflected in her care for Garnet and Steiner. Meristation writer Eduardo Granado regarded her as among the best Final Fantasy enemies. He noted that while she is not strictly a villain, he wanted to acknowledge her due to how cool she was, as well as her not being as recognized as he would like. In the book The Legend of Final Fantasy IX: Creation - Universe - Decryption, Beatrix was discussed, namely how her extreme strength were a "clever way of showing us that the coldness and cruelty of this warrior, with her complex and troubling personality, are just a facade hiding her extreme internal fragility." Her relationship with Steiner and gradual turn thanks to her conflicts over Brahne's actions was also discussed, comparing her to Leo Cristophe from Final Fantasy VI, who was similarly powerful and dealing with the morality of his kingdom.
