= Vivi Ornitier =

Video game character

- Final Fantasy character
- Vivi in Dissidia Final Fantasy Opera Omnia
- First game: Final Fantasy IX (2000)
- Voiced by: English; Melissa Disney (Kingdom Hearts II); Kath Soucie (World of Final Fantasy); Japanese; Ikue Otani

Vivi Ornitier (Japanese: ビビ・オルニティア, Hepburn: Bibi Orunitia) (Note: Orunitia is localized as both Orunitia and Ornitier depending on the source.) is a video game character in the Final Fantasy series. He appears in the video game Final Fantasy IX, where he serves as a member of the game's main cast. He is a shy character who through the game's plot grapples with the trauma of discovering his past and identity. He is a Black Mage, a class of magic users who employ fire, ice, lightning, and other elements into their magic. His design took inspiration from the film The Dark Crystal and was meant to appear both realistic and comic-like; part of the game's world was designed around him in turn. He has appeared in other games such as the Theatrhythm Final Fantasy series, Kingdom Hearts II, and World of Final Fantasy. A felt doll of Vivi was included with pre-orders of the Japanese original release of FFIX.

== Concept and creation ==
Vivi Ornitier was created for the video game Final Fantasy IX. He is kind and of pure heart, yet is also obedient, quiet, indecisive, and introverted. He is a Black Mage, a class of magic user who employs fire, ice, lightning, and other elements into their magic. His character design was meant to strike a balance between realism and a comic-like style, while taking inspiration from the style employed for the characters in the film The Dark Crystal. When designing Final Fantasy IX, the designers made a point of designing a part of the world around Vivi due to him being a key character of the story. An early scene in the game features various characters posing as members of a play; while he does not participate in the final version, a previous version has him participating after being coaxed by Zidane Tribal in order to avoid being arrested.

While Final Fantasy IX lacks voice actors, Vivi would get multiple voice actors across various other games. In Kingdom Hearts II, he is voiced by Ikue Ōtani in the Japanese version and Melissa Disney in the English version, while in World of Final Fantasy and Chocobo GP, his English voice actor is Kath Soucie.

== Appearances ==
Vivi appears in Final Fantasy IX as one of its main protagonists and is a Black Mage. He becomes embroiled in a kidnapping plot by Zidane Tribal and others to kidnap Garnet Til Alexandros XVII during Vivi's trip to attend a play, where the three of them and Adelbert Steiner travel together. He later discovers a Black Mage factory, which causes him to remain with the group to seek out the truth of his identity and origin, as well as why he has emotions where the other Black Mages do not. He later discovers that the Black Mages are mindless footsoldiers, manufactured by a man named Kuja and supplied to Garnet's mother Queen Brahne to conquer the Mist Continent. He finds the Black Mage Village, where he is told that most Black Mages stop functioning after about one year, though he discovers that he is a prototype Black Mage built to last longer. He aids the group in overcoming Kuja and other threats. He is implied to have died during his ending monologue, and he has created seven copies of himself, with one identifying himself as Vivi's son.

He appears in other Final Fantasy titles, including Final Fantasy Record Keeper, Brave Exvius, the Theatrhythm series, and World of Final Fantasy, the latter featuring him as the leader of a group of Black Mages who gains sentience after battling the protagonists. Vivi also appears in non-Final Fantasy works. One such work is the Disney/Square Enix crossover Kingdom Hearts II, a series which features appearances by both Disney and Square Enix characters. He is a member of the Twilight Town Disciplinary Committee, a group run by Seifer Almasy. This group routinely antagonizes protagonist Roxas, though Vivi is friendly to him despite that. He also appears in Puzzle & Dragons.

A felt doll of Vivi was included with Final Fantasy IX in Japan at launch. It was given out to people who pre-ordered the game starting on June 1, 2000. A figurine of Vivi was released by Play Arts.

A card based on Vivi was printed in the Magic: The Gathering Final Fantasy set, later being banned in the standard format due to power level issues.

== Reception ==
Vivi's character received universal acclaim, regarded by Famitsu readers as one of the best video game characters. He was named one of the best Final Fantasy characters by IGN and Complex staff, the latter calling Vivi's design "iconic", a sentiment that Sarah Doherty of RPG Site shared. Dave Smith of IGN felt that Vivi was simple yet complex, owing to him feeling like a mixture of old and new Final Fantasy elements. Chris Carter of Destructoid identified Vivi as one of the core reasons for their enjoyment of Final Fantasy IX, while Bitmob staff noted him as a standout among the game's cast. Mike Diver of Vice called him one of the most overlooked video game characters, praising him for his evocative story line. Aoife Wilson, also of Vice, regarded Vivi's discovery of his origins as one of the greatest moments in the series. Jason Schreier of Kotaku called Vivi the best character in the game, praising his character evolution as the most significant aspect of the story. Adam Biessener of Game Informer discussed how exciting it was to see a character with his design, and noted that they wish they could have followed Vivi's story instead of Zidane's. Screen Rant staff praised Vivi as one of the best Final Fantasy heroes, agreeing that he should have been the lead, feeling that Zidane's plot arc was derivative and inferior to Vivi's. Vivi's implied death was regarded by staff as one of the saddest in the series. Joshua Carpenter of RPGamer felt that Vivi's quest for meaning was the most emotional part of the game. Nadia Oxford of USGamer called him one of the best-written characters in a Japanese role-playing game while similarly praising his journey. Gerren Fisher of Venture Beat discussed how they connected to Vivi due to going through similar things in their life as a child, such as his shyness and learning about death. Vivi's story was therapeutic for him. In 2020, NHK conducted an All-Final Fantasy Grand Poll of Japanese players, featuring over 468,000 votes. The poll named Vivi as the franchise’s 4th best character, the highest placement for any Final Fantasy IX character. In 2021, Matthew Byrd of Den of Geek ranked Vivi #1 on the list of the top 15 Final Fantasy characters of all time.
