= Final Fantasy XIV: Dawntrail =

2024 Final Fantasy XIV expansion pack

- Collector's edition cover art depicting the Warrior of Light as a Viper in Tural
- Developer: Square Enix Creative Studio III
- Publisher: Square Enix
- Director: Naoki Yoshida
- Producer: Naoki Yoshida
- Composer: Masayoshi Soken
- Series: Final Fantasy
- Platforms: macOS; PlayStation 4; PlayStation 5; Windows; Xbox Series X/S; Nintendo Switch 2 (Note: Since August 2026)
- Release: July 2, 2024
- Genre: MMORPG
- Mode: Multiplayer

Final Fantasy XIV: Dawntrail (Note: In Japanese: ファイナルファンタジーXIV: 黄金の遺産(レガシー) (Hepburn: Fainaru Fantajī Fōtīn: Ōgon no Regashī; lit. Final Fantasy XIV: Gilded Legacy)) is the fifth expansion pack to Final Fantasy XIV, a massively multiplayer online role-playing game (MMORPG) developed and published by Square Enix. It was released on July 2, 2024, over two years after the game's previous expansion, Endwalker, for Windows, macOS, PlayStation 4, PlayStation 5, and Xbox Series X/S, then later on Nintendo Switch 2. Like its predecessors, Naoki Yoshida served as director and producer and Masayoshi Soken composed the soundtrack. The expansion pack was released as a standalone product for current players; for new players, the "Complete Edition" that originally launched with Heavensward was updated to include all expansions including Dawntrail.

In Dawntrail, players travel to Tural, a continent across the sea, to participate in a rite of succession to determine the next leader of Tuliyollal. They serve as champion for Wuk Lamat, one of the current leader's children, and are joined by allies from Eorzea who support different candidates. After the climactic events of Endwalker, Dawntrail was designed as a "summer vacation" for the player's character, the Warrior of Light. In addition to adding new areas, the expansion pack increased the level cap, debuted two character classes and a new playable race, and initiated the game's first major graphical overhaul since its relaunch in 2013.

At launch, Dawntrail received generally positive reviews, though it was not as well received as its widely acclaimed previous expansions, Shadowbringers and Endwalker.

== Gameplay ==
The gameplay of Dawntrail largely matches that of the base game. Players interact with each other in a persistent world. The two new jobs in Dawntrail are Viper, a dexterous dual-wielding swordsmaster, and Pictomancer, a paint-based mage. Vipers can combine their two swords into a stronger two-handed weapon for certain attacks, similar to Zidane from Final Fantasy IX. Based on Relm Arrowny's magic in Final Fantasy VI, Pictomancers render their imaginings as painted images, casting both damaging and supportive spells for the party. Krile, a recurring member of the Scions, changes her class to Pictomancer in this expansion. Director Naoki Yoshida stated that the more recently designed classes, including Viper and Pictomancer, feel "more complete" compared to ones introduced in earlier expansions.

A new Field Operations activity called "Cosmic Exploration" was added in patch 7.21. Working similarly to Ishgardian Restoration in Shadowbringers, Cosmic Exploration is an instanced gameplay mode that allows players to develop a base of operations on the moon and faraway planets beyond, leveling up their crafting and gathering skills and obtaining unique rewards along the way. The first new location, Phaenna, was made available in patch 7.31, while the second, Oizys, was made available in patch 7.41, and the final location, Auxesia, was released in patch 7.51.

Another Field Operations activity for combat classes called "Occult Crescent" was also introduced in patch 7.25, with the South Horn instance being initially available, followed by the North Horn in patch 7.55. Like Eureka and Save the Queen (Bozja) before it in Stormblood and Shadowbringers, respectively, it features what has been described as "old-school" MMORPG gameplay and allows the use of unique actions and spells from "phantom jobs" based on those from Final Fantasy V. Players work together to increase their Knowledge levels, unlock more phantom jobs, and eventually take on high-tier raids called the Forked Towers, which permits up to 48 players to attempt to overcome them.

Beastmaster was added as a "Limited" job in patch 7.56, with the same restrictions on player matchmaking as Blue Mage. The job is armed with a one-handed axe and a shield as weapons, while players strengthen themselves by taming creatures in the game's world by forging pacts with them and summoning them in battle. When the job is unlocked, players are given a bestiary that records captured creatures and contains descriptions of their in-game locations, traits, and skills in battle. Forging a pact with a creature requires players to be at the same or higher level than their targets and to use the "Capture" skill, with their success rate increasing the lower their target's hit points are at the time the Capture skill was used, as well as how much higher the player's level is relative to their target. Most captures are not strictly limited to a specific instance of a given creature, and as such players may find alternate sources in order to tame them at higher or lower levels.

Beastmasters also have access to unique battle content with roguelike elements called "Crucible of the Unbroken". Themed after a tabletop game, players must choose a "board" to challenge. Once chosen, they must also prepare a roster of ten to fifteen familiars before entering the instance, with their maximum roster sizes depending on the board chosen. Unlike overworld encounters, players may only bring up to three familiars into a given combat encounter, as well as having hit points and being able to take damage. Combat encounters on the board consists of battles against one or more enemies in enclosed areas separate from the map instance. Clearing encounters and the boards in their entirety allows players to gain experience points for the job and their familiars to make them stronger, as well as a special currency unique to the instance called "territory tokens" which they can spend on items and equipment to strengthen themselves and their familiars and to use in battle. Territory tokens can also be gained at shops by selling unwanted items. Once players complete the Beastmaster job storyline, they have access to difficulty multipliers as well as a ranked competitive leaderboard. Each season runs every two weeks, and the top 300 players from each region are eligible to receive exclusive rewards.

== Plot ==
The main characters of Dawntrail, from left to right: (bottom row) Krile, Wuk Lamat, Zoraal Ja, Thancred; (second row) Erenville, the Warrior of Light, Urianger, Koana; (top) Gulool Ja Ja and Sphene (above).

=== Setting and characters ===
Dawntrail takes place on Tural, a continent across the sea far to the west. The culture and geography of Tural are inspired by Latin America and Southeast Asia. Yok Tural, the southern half of the continent, includes the capital of Tuliyollal, a coastal metropolis drawing inspiration from Tenochtitlan—the historic center of modern Mexico City. Another region, Urqopacha, is mountainous and reminiscent of the Andes, featuring Peruvian and Incan architecture. Kozama'uka is an Amazon rainforest-like region, homeland of the birdlike Hanuhanu. Yak T'el is a cenote-covered jungle resembling the Yucatán Peninsula, the southern portion of which is a meteor-bombarded forest featuring the Mamool Ja homeland of Mamook. Xak Tural in the north contains Shaaloani, which is similar to the American Wild West. A new Field Operations area called Shades' Triangle derives from the Bermuda Triangle.

The nation of Tuliyollal is a multi-ethnic federated monarchy led by Gulool Ja Ja, a two-headed Mamool Ja who united the continent under one banner during a journey eighty years ago. Two-headed members of his species possess fearsome strength and potent magical abilities. He and his legendary companions traveled across Tural while forging alliances, quelling conflict between warring peoples, and even sealing away the flying calamity known as Valigarmanda. As Dawnservant, his reign is characterized by an unprecedented era of peace and prosperity.

Shortly before the events of Dawntrail, Gulool Ja Ja announced a contest to determine the next ruler of the nation. Three of the candidates are his children: Zoraal Ja, his one-headed biological son known as the 'miracle' due to the belief that two-headed Mamool Ja are sterile; Koana, his adopted son who studied abroad in Old Sharlayan to bring their technologies back to Tural; and Wuk Lamat, his adopted daughter who is earnest and headstrong but sheltered. Whereas both Koana and Wuk Lamat hope to maintain the peace that Gulool Ja Ja established, Zoraal Ja has ambitions to conquer and colonize the rest of the world, motivated by his inferiority complex with respect to his father's accomplishments. The last candidate is Bakool Ja Ja, another two-headed Mamool Ja from Mamook who aims to institute Mamool Ja supremacy in Tuliyollal.

Wuk Lamat journeys to Old Sharlayan to recruit the player's character, a hero known as the Warrior of Light, to aid in her succession bid. They are joined by some of the player's allies from the Scions of the Seventh Dawn, including the twins Alphinaud and Alisaie; Krile, who is pursuing the truth about her grandfather Galuf's travels to Tural; and Wuk Lamat's childhood friend Erenville. Koana, meanwhile, enlists the aid of the Scions Thancred and Urianger.

=== Story ===
The Warrior of Light's sea voyage to Tural is rocked by a devastating thunderstorm, which damages structures throughout the continent. Upon arrival, Wuk Lamat introduces her entourage to the city of Tuliyollal, and Gulool Ja Ja assembles the candidates to explain the rules of the contest. The winner is the candidate who first discovers the fabled 'city of gold' after completing all seven Feats in the Tuliyollal Saga, which retells the story of the nation's founding. Wuk Lamat and her companions travel across the land to find the electors of each clan, who are in charge of administering the Feats and awarding keystones. Following in her father's footsteps, Wuk Lamat tames an alpaca in Urqopacha and revives the failing reed crop in Kozama'uka. The candidates help the Moblins restore their economy following the devastation of the storm, completing another Feat. During a brief respite, Gulool Ja Ja confides in the player that he believes none of the candidates possess the character to become Dawnservant, and that the contest was designed to develop them.

Bakool Ja Ja, who was absent during the previous Feat, abducts Wuk Lamat and steals her keystone. Her companions cooperate with Koana's entourage to rescue her. In the highlands of Urqopacha, they seek the elector of the Yok Huy, an ancient race of giants, who waits at the mountain's peak. While the other candidates climb, Bakool Ja Ja sabotages the ice prison encasing Valigarmanda, freeing the calamity to terrorize the region. Zoraal Ja, Koana, Wuk Lamat, and their allies work together to vanquish the fiend, earning them keystones.

In Yak T'el, the candidates cook a traditional roast pork pibil. After the trial, Wuk Lamat bests Bakool Ja Ja in single combat and reclaims her stolen keystone. They proceed to Mamook, where the final challenge is to defeat an apparition of Gulool Ja Ja in his prime. Zoraal Ja fails and is disqualified when he attacks the elector. Bakool Ja Ja fails when the elector, his father, banishes him for lacking keystones from the previous Feats. Before attempting the Feat herself, Wuk Lamat seeks to understand the Mamool Ja people as she did with each of the prior clans. Bakool Ja Ja's mother reveals that the secret of producing two-headed Mamool Ja is a selective breeding program with a 99% mortality rate. With Bakool Ja Ja's support, the Mamool Ja reject the brutal practice. Koana relinquishes his candidacy to help Wuk Lamat defeat Gulool Ja Ja's apparition, completing the last Feat.

Beneath the Mamool Ja cenotaph, they find the entrance to the city of gold, a portal locked by a technologically advanced seal. Gulool Ja Ja announces that Wuk Lamat is the winner of the contest. She nominates Koana to become co-Dawnservant with her, mirroring Gulool Ja Ja's two heads representing Reason and Resolve. During the coronation ceremony, Zoraal Ja uses a key stolen from Gulool Ja Ja's vault to lift the seal of the portal. The portal leads Zoraal Ja to Alexandria, a civilization in an alternate dimension. He allies with the queen of Alexandria, Sphene, and becomes their king.

While exploring Xak Tural after the coronation, the Warrior of Light discovers a massive electric barrier has descended over a region called Yyasulani. Airships emerge from the barrier, carrying mechanical soldiers who lay siege upon Tuliyollal. They are commanded by Zoraal Ja, now augmented by Alexandrian technology, who challenges Gulool Ja Ja to a duel for the throne. Though Gulool Ja Ja defeats him easily, his headpiece activates, resurrecting him from the dead and empowering him to kill Gulool Ja Ja. Unsatisfied that he needed a handicap to kill his elderly father, he challenges Wuk Lamat to find and kill him in Alexandria, threatening to resume the assault on the city.

The Scions devise a plan to pierce the barrier around Yyasulani using a train-delivered bomb, which succeeds with the help of all the Turali clans. Inside, they discover that thirty years have passed within the dome since Zoraal Ja first arrived and used the power of the key to perform interdimensional fusion, combining the land of Yyasulani with a portion of Alexandria's dimension. The people of Xak Tural who were trapped inside the dome have assimilated into Alexandrian society and now wear regulators—headpieces which allow the user to come back to life by expending souls harvested from the dead. Citizens who die of natural causes have their memories uploaded to a server in Everkeep, Alexandria's central fortress, but living regulator users lose all memories of the deceased.

Wuk Lamat befriends Queen Sphene, who is devoted to the welfare of both the Alexandrian and assimilated Turali citizens. Sphene dislikes Zoraal Ja's methods and entreats Wuk Lamat to help her remove him from power. They meet Cahciua, Erenville's mother, who is the leader of Oblivion, a resistance group dedicated to ousting Zoraal Ja and stopping interdimensional fusion. While exploring Everkeep, they encounter Gulool Ja, a vagabond child who resembles Zoraal Ja and occasionally accepts aid from Oblivion. They follow the child to the ruins of Old Alexandria where they meet his guardian Otis, a knight trapped in a robotic body who volunteered as the first test subject for memory extraction. This technology allowed scientists to revive Sphene as a digital avatar who has since ruled Alexandria.

Growing impatient, Zoraal Ja orders the attack on Tuliyollal, but Koana and the Scions rebuff it with the aid of Bakool Ja Ja and new allies from the east. Zoraal Ja reveals that the reason for the attack is to harvest the nation's souls to power the server in Everkeep—the energy crisis that forced Sphene to ally with Zoraal Ja. With the genocide of Tuliyollal thwarted, he turns his soldiers on the residents of Everkeep to power his ambitions. Sphene, Wuk Lamat, and the Scions protect the citizens and confront Zoraal Ja at the summit of Everkeep. He expends all of his souls on enhancing his strength, saving none for resurrection, and is defeated. Before dying, Zoraal Ja entrusts his authority to Gulool Ja, who is revealed to be his son.

Sphene claims the key and uses it to initiate interdimensional fusion, with the intent of completely absorbing the power of the Source, considering the sacrifice to be worth it to preserve the memories of her people. The Scions pursue her to Living Memory, the top level of Everkeep accessed through the portal in Mamook and the true city of gold depicted in Gulool Ja Ja's journey. There, memories of dead Alexandrians manifest in corporeal form as the Endless. The Scions find Cahciua is actually one of the Endless, and she asks them to shut down the storage servers to allow their digital shades to rest. On the way, Krile meets her parents, the founders of Oblivion, who reveal that they sent her as a newborn across dimensions to the Source with the key to deny it from Sphene.

With the servers deactivated, the Scions pursue Sphene through her digitized memories of Alexandria and confront her as Queen Eternal. During the final battle, Queen Eternal attempts to delete Sphene's human memories to prevent remorse for her actions, but Wuk Lamat breaks through to her and restores her personality. They reconcile and lament not meeting sooner when Sphene was alive. As the last servers shut down, Sphene entrusts the safety of her living citizens to Wuk Lamat, and the key to the Warrior and Scions, before she too is deactivated. Young Gulool Ja becomes king of Alexandria, and Tuliyollal celebrates the Dawnservants' victory.

=== Patches ===
The Warrior of Light attends Sphene's funeral in Everkeep, where Alexandria's citizens struggle to process their grief in their first time remembering the existence of death. During the funeral, Gulool Ja expresses his desire to know about his mother, leading the Scions to an abandoned research facility where Zoraal Ja performed soul transfer experiments on captive beasts. They recover audio logs recorded by Teeshal Ja, one of the scientists and the mother of Gulool Ja, that recount how Zoraal Ja spurned his son. In Shaaloani, the Warrior, Wuk Lamat, and Erenville assist Koana in restarting railway operations by neutralizing an apex predator disrupting the ecosystem.

At Everkeep, Wuk Lamat and the Warrior are surprised to encounter Sphene alive and unharmed, declaring to the people that they are to be made Endless to alleviate their fears of death using a limited number of "neo-regulators". The Alexandrians' memories have been altered to remember the funeral being held for those killed in Zoraal Ja's attack rather than Sphene's death.

Meanwhile, Y'shtola visits Living Memory with Oblivion member Shale and discovers the original Queen Sphene of Alexandria collapsed on the ground. Thought to have died 400 years prior, Sphene is brought to Oblivion's headquarters, where it is revealed she had been kept in cryostasis and released upon Living Memory's shutdown. To differentiate this Sphene from the ones they'd seen previously, they begin to refer to the fake as a simulant and the one they first met as Endless Sphene. While exploring Solution Nine, Wuk Lamat, Sphene, and the Warrior of Light encounter the simulant, who demands the key to interdimensional fusion returned to her. She also reveals that she is working for a young man called Calyx, the founder of Preservation and the first to master the electrope technology which powers Alexandria. Appearing remotely via a video screen, Calyx promises consequences if the key is not delivered to him. Sphene recognizes him and deduces from his existence 400 years later that he is an Endless as well.

Shale tracks Calyx's transmission to the Underkeep, a location at the base of the tower that houses the original Alexandria castle. During the group's venture into the castle, the Warrior of Light defeats a robotic recreation of Zelenia, a knight of Alexandria. Calyx confirms that Alexandria hails from the Ninth shard and that he is aware of the sundering. He gifts them with Endless Sphene's tiara and her regulator and then vanishes. Upon returning to Everkeep, the Scions encounter the city's robots and vehicles acting of their own accord, injuring and killing citizens. The machines eventually stop their assault, and Gulool Ja restricts their access to weaponry to prevent future incidents. Sphene pledges to relearn her magical abilities.

Under Calyx's command, the city's robots resume killing Alexandrians with their bare hands, and they harvest the souls and aether from their corpses. Citizens targeted by the attack are those that have shunned regulators, and their murders, along with the artificial scarcity of the neo-regulators, heighten the population's fears of death and compel them to obtain their own neo-regulators. Hoping to locate Calyx, the Warrior of Light and their companions explore an abandoned floor of Everkeep, discovered to be the laboratory where the Endless was first researched. Calyx appears on the facility's main terminal and invites them to a confrontation at the top of the Meso Terminal in Living Memory.

The Scions ascend the Meso Terminal, defeating its security and the Endless summoned by Calyx. At the pinnacle, Calyx activates the neo-regulators, enthralling their wearers, and draws on the Alexandrians' fears of death to summon Necron—a primal of death incarnate. The party defeats Necron and readies to attack the core containing Calyx's memories, but the primal is resurrected. Through a city-wide broadcast, Sphene allays the enthralled citizens' fears of death, weakening Necron and allowing the group to vanquish it. The Warrior of Light destroys the core before Calyx can transfer his memories and he vanishes. Alexandria heals, and Gulool Ja pledges to grow stronger and protect his nation by training under Tuliyollal's Landsguard.

Some weeks later, Oblivion discovers that the Alexandrians' memories of death were never fully deleted but stored in the Meso Terminal. With the Alexandrian citizens' approval, the terminals in Living Memory are reactivated, returning their memories to them. Sphene takes her place as Queen of Reason, and Wuk Lamat rejoins Koana in Tuliyollal to lead their people. Meanwhile, Calyx is revealed to have survived, and an Ascian approaches him from behind. Calyx assures them that he will to report to the pair's "Winterer" peers.

Following Calyx's defeat, Krile expresses interest in exploring the Ninth beyond Living Memory. The Warrior and their allies take an airship from Living Memory to the surface below, landing on the continent of Mist where Alexandria formerly stood. The group arrives at the city of Treno and assists them with repelling monsters after the city's barrier is breached. Shortly after, an alarm warns the city of an incoming attack from an old war machine called the Doomtrain. The Warrior destroys the Doomtrain and returns to Treno to repel another monster attack while the city's engineers repair the barrier.

City mayor Miayli reveals that she is the latest in the line of descendants of the Speaker who escaped the Fifth Umbral Calamity in the Source, and that Krile's mother Alayla is her sister. Alayla gave the interdimensional key to Preservation out of desperation to return to their ancestral home in the South Sea Isles. The Warrior leaves Treno and is spied on by an Auri woman identified as Halmarut, one of the last remaining Ascians. She speaks with a plush animal that is possessed by Calyx and says that the Ninth and the other worlds will soon die as a result of Hydaelyn's death.

Shale and Y'shtola figure out how to remove the key from its protective confinement. Meanwhile, voidgates open up across the Source, and the Scions travel to Garlemald to assist the Garlean contingent in driving back the invading voidsent. Knowing that the voidgate they used to defeat Zeromus is located on the moon, the Scions travel there. Holding the key, the Warrior hears an Ancient voice, who calls the key "Ethos", and with it, they travel to the Thirteenth and reunite with Golbez and Zero. Enuo, a powerful voidsent, attempts to continue the assault on the Source, but they are defeated by the trio, halting the voidsent invasion. Before the Warrior returns back to the Source, Golbez reveals concern that the barriers between shards are weakening.

On the moon, the Warrior and the Scions are confronted by Halmarut and Calyx. They explain that their motives concern an upcoming event called the Solstice that without Hydaelyn to maintain equilibrium, all shards will naturally rejoin and life on the Source will be wiped out and restarted. Halmarut, however, seeks to save life on the Source by forcing rejoinings before the Solstice occurs, destroying all of the shards in the process. To do so, she has recruited people like Calyx from different shards to form the Winterers, a group whose members seek to use the shards' destruction to fulfill their individual ambitions. The Scions return to the Rising Stones in Mor Dhona, and Y'shtola entrusts Ethos to the Warrior. Calyx approaches the Warrior alone, revealing that he and Halmarut plan to visit the Fourth, an ice-covered world where inhabitants live in the sky, to observe another Winterer's actions. Calyx admits he doesn't agree with the ideals of some of his Winterer peers before departing.

Estinien rejoins the Scions and the group confirms that Ethos and Azem's crystal combined let the Warrior travel to other shards freely. The Warrior tests the theory by envisioning Calyx and Halmarut and ends up on a floating isle in the skies of the Fourth, surprisingly joined by Estinien and Alphinaud due to the Warrior envisioning a woman resembling Ysayle. The trio are attacked by unknown creatures but are saved by a young girl called Visna, flying on an airship with her crew to salvage resources from the floating isle. At first hesitant, she demands that the Scions show their "brands" to prove their identity. Not being from the Fourth, the Scions divulge their origins from the Source and that they lack brands. Visna explains that everyone on the Fourth lives and survives on giant floating realmships, they are chased by gigantic arcane beings called jötnar and that the creatures that attacked them earlier capture people for them to feed on, and that each one's inhabitants have a brand, hers being that of Water, and the realmship called Naglfar. Visna promises to take the trio to Naglfar, where her master awaits so they can learn more of the state of the Fourth. Given the journey will take time, the Warrior returns to the Source and communicates to the Scions everything that occurred including that Alphinaud and Estinien are safe but stranded. On an isle on the Fourth, Halmarut queries as to why Calyx informed the Warrior of their destination and suggests she might have offered support. Calyx responds by querying Halmarut's own intentions givens she is bound to the world, offering to call her by her real name rather than her Convocation title. Halmarut declines, stating that her objective as an Ascian remains the same as those like Lahabrea before her.

== Development ==
After concluding a 10-year-long storyline in Endwalker, Dawntrail was designed as a "summer vacation" for the Warrior of Light, the player's character. Naoki Yoshida, producer and director for the series, considers it the start of "season two" of a long-running television show, and hopes to use it to lay the groundwork for another 10 years of service. For Yoshida, it was important to reset the stakes of the conflict from a universe-ending threat to a more personal one.

A central endeavor of this expansion was a major graphical overhaul, which includes improved shadows, environmental and player textures, real-time lighting, and more detailed and varied environmental features like grass and flowers. It also includes support for a number of graphics upscaling technologies, such as DLSS and FSR. Yoshida called this the "first phase" of graphical improvements to the game because certain techniques were still unfeasible to apply to a real-time online game and he aimed to employ them in the future.

The focus on the "New World" in this expansion drew some pre-release criticism. The development team did additional research to properly and respectfully depict indigenous cultures in the game. They also sought feedback from language professionals who specialize in Central and South American languages to ensure authenticity in naming. A major theme of the game is the coming together of diverse cultures and values into a mutual understanding.

=== Release and patch history ===
Early access to Dawntrail began on June 28, 2024, for players who pre-ordered the game with the full release on July 2. To promote the expansion, Square Enix created a parody tourism website, TourTural.com, that depicts activities and locations within the game as part of a travel brochure. Rhys Darby starred in commercials filmed for the website as the new Interim Deputy Director of 'Turalism' tasked with promoting a vacation to Tural.

Dawntrail was released on July 2, 2024. Square Enix promoted its release in several cities worldwide. A replica of an 'Aetheryte' was installed at King's Cross in London, while murals featuring various characters were painted in Los Angeles, Melbourne, and Sydney.

In August 2025 at Gamescom, Square Enix and Capcom revealed crossover events between Final Fantasy XIV and Monster Hunter Wilds, similar to during Stormblood when Monster Hunter: World had its own collaboration. On Final Fantasy XIV's side, players can confront the monster Guardian Arkveld and acquire cosmetic rewards including a Seikret mount.

Patches and expansions
Patch	Title	Release date	Notes
7.0	Dawntrail	July 2, 2024	The Arcadion: AAC Light-heavyweight raids debuted two weeks post-launch, with a Savage difficulty mode releasing two weeks after. In the storyline, the Warrior of Light competes in the Ascension Arcadia Championship against Alexandria's fighters who augment their capabilities with feral souls, causing them to be afflicted with a disease known as psychonekrosis.
7.1	"Crossroads"	November 12, 2024	"Crossroads" adds Jeuno: The First Walk, the first part of the Echoes of Vana'diel 24-man "alliance raid" series collaboration with Final Fantasy XI. In the storyline, the Warrior of Light and Bakool Ja Ja investigate Vana'diel, an alternate world summoned by Sareel Ja who intends to conquer the star with its phantoms. Other features include Pelupelu allied society quests for Disciples of War and Magic, a "Chaotic" difficulty alliance raid against the Cloud of Darkness, an Extreme trial against Queen Eternal, and the sixth Ultimate raid, Futures Rewritten.
7.2	"Seekers of Eternity"	March 25, 2025	The Arcadion raid series continues with AAC Cruiserweight, with a Savage mode released one week after launch. The Warrior climbs the Cruiserweight division rankings, convincing their opponents to stop competing in an effort to end further psychonekrosis. Other features include two new Exploratory Missions: one for crafters and gatherers called Cosmic Exploration, and another for combat classes called Occult Crescent; as well as Mamool Ja allied society quests for gatherers.
7.3	"The Promise of Tomorrow"	August 5, 2025	The Echoes of Vana'diel series continues with San d'Oria: The Second Walk, in which the Warrior investigates another city called San d'Oria. Other features include Yok Huy allied society quests for crafters, a new Deep Dungeon called Pilgrim's Traverse, and a collaboration with Monster Hunter Wilds featuring the monster Guardian Arkveld as a boss.
7.4	"Into the Mist"	December 16, 2025	The Arcadion raid series concludes with AAC Heavyweight, with a Savage mode released three weeks after launch instead of one due to the holiday season. The Warrior climbs the Heavyweight division rankings, becoming the grand champion and confronting the president to end the use of feral souls. Other features include a comprehensive overhaul to the glamour system, with changes including lifting job and level restrictions on glamoured gear, allowing them to be used regardless of class or level.
7.5	"Trail to the Heavens"	April 28, 2026	Releasing in two parts, the main scenario quest concludes the lead-up into Evercold, with the second part released on September 8, 2026. The Echoes of Vana'diel series concludes with Windurst: The Third Walk, with the Warrior stopping Sareel Ja's plans for subjugating the star. Other features include the introduction of Beastmaster as a limited job and instanced battle content with roguelike elements called the Crucible of the Unbroken, the seventh Ultimate raid featuring Final Fantasy VI antagonist Kefka Palazzo titled Dancing Mad, an Ocean Fishing route in Thavnair, a second zone in the Occult Crescent, the North Horn and an open dungeon within called Forked Tower: Magic featuring Normal and Extreme difficulty modes. Region-wide matchmaking across all data centers per region was also implemented during the patch cycle beginning on October 12 for Japanese data centers, followed by North American and European data centers on November 10 and Chinese data centers on December 1. As part of a collaboration with the Final Fantasy VII remake trilogy that includes an 8-player raid series in Evercold, the Manderville Gold Saucer was updated on October 28 to include a section themed around the Final Fantasy VII Rebirth incarnation of the Gold Saucer and an accompanying cooperative typing minigame called Keybound Brawler. The free trial and Starter Edition of the game was updated to include Shadowbringers, and a Nintendo Switch 2 version was released in August.

=== Music ===
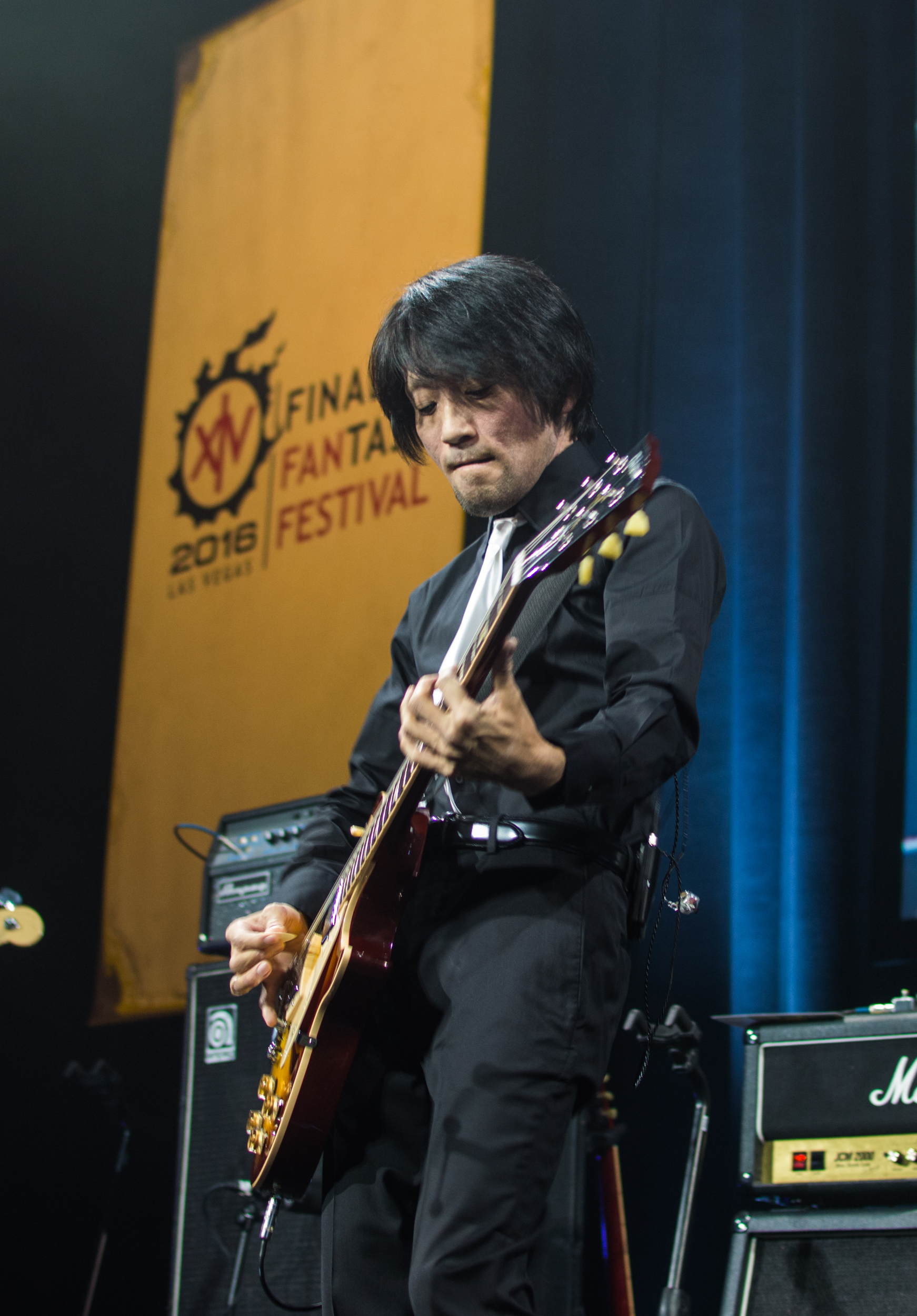
Masayoshi Soken composed the soundtrack to Dawntrail.

Masayoshi Soken composed the majority of the expansion's score in addition to his duties as sound director. The soundtrack uses jazz as a basis because it fits with the theme of diverse elements coming together.

The raid series Arcadion features a number of guest vocalists including Chrissy Costanza of Against the Current, who provided vocals for "Give It All". The song "Everything Burns" featured in patch 7.4 is a collaboration between Tom Morello and Caleb Shomo of the band Beartooth.

== Reception ==
Dawntrail received generally positive reviews. On review aggregator Metacritic, Dawntrail has an average score of 79/100 based on 35 critic reviews, indicating "generally favorable" reviews, but the lowest score of the five Final Fantasy XIV expansions.

Despite a generally positive response to the game's new content, the story's pacing and character prioritization have drawn criticism. Responding to what PC Gamer described as a mixed reception of Dawntrail, Yoshida admitted that the development team anticipated some level of mixed reactions to the main scenario questline, particularly after the high expectations set by previous expansions. He attributed issues in pacing to the effort to thoroughly introduce the new continent, cultures, and characters of Dawntrail, recognizing that some story elements could have been better suited to side quests. Yoshida acknowledged that Wuk Lamat's lack of confidence and complex background may have contributed to the perceived slow pacing and frustration among players.

Dawntrail was nominated for "Best Ongoing Game" and "Best Community Support" at The Game Awards 2024. The game was nominated for those categories again at The Game Awards 2025.
