= Masashi Sugawara =

Japanese voice actor

- 菅原 正志
- Born: July 14, 1962 (age 64); Kanagawa, Japan
- Occupation: Voice actor
- Agent: Office Osawa

Masashi Sugawara (菅原 正志; (born July 14, 1962 in Kanagawa) is a Japanese voice actor who voiced Vigoro in Skies of Arcadia, Jean Valjean in Les Misérables: Shōjo Cosette, and George Joestar in JoJo's Bizarre Adventure.

== Filmography ==
=== Television animation ===
- Aoki Densetsu Shoot! (1993) (Tetsuya Sugawara)
- Trigun (1998) (Ingway)
- One Piece (1999) (Porchemy)
- Les Misérables: Shōjo Cosette (2007) (Jean Valjean)
- Hajime no Ippo: New Challenger (2009) (Ricardo Martinez)
- Shiki (2010) (Ozaki)
- Nekogami Yaoyorozu (2011) (Narrator, Genzou)
- JoJo's Bizarre Adventure (2012) (George Joestar I)
- Broken Blade (2014) (Baldr)
- 7 Seeds (2019) (Unami)
- Negative Positive Angler (2024) (Fujishiro)

=== Original video animation ===
- Mobile Suit Gundam 0083: Stardust Memory (1991) (South Burning)
- Kyō Kara Ore Wa!! (1993) (Sasaki)
- Appleseed XIII (2011) (Baxter)

=== Theatrical animation ===
- Doraemon: Nobita and the Animal Planet (1990) (Horse)
- Doraemon: Nobita and the Spiral City (1997) (Ain Motain)
- Naruto the Movie: Guardians of the Crescent Moon Kingdom (2006) (Ishidate)
- Detective Conan: The Raven Chaser (2009) (Kazuki Honjo)

=== Video games ===
- Shinsetsu Samurai Spirits Bushidō Retsuden (1997) (Earthquake)
- Street Fighter Alpha 3 (1998) (E. Honda)
- Power Stone (1999) (Valgas)
- Fatal Fury: Wild Ambition (1999) (Toji Sakata)
- Capcom vs. SNK (2000) (E. Honda)
- Skies of Arcadia (2000) (Vigoro)
- Capcom vs. SNK 2 (2001) (E. Honda)
- Dissidia Final Fantasy: Opera Omnia (2017) (General Leo)
- Final Fantasy VII Remake (2020) (Chocobo Sam)

=== Tokusatsu ===
- Chōriki Sentai Ohranger (1995) (Bara Cactus 1 (ep. 5))
- Kamen Rider Ex-Aid (2017) (Gamedeus Bugster (ep. 42 - 44))

=== Dubbing ===
==== Live-action ====
- Wesley Snipes
  - Blade (Eric Brooks / Blade)
  - Blade II (Eric Brooks / Blade)
  - Blade: Trinity (Eric Brooks / Blade)
  - 7 Seconds (Jack Tuliver)
  - The Detonator (Sonni Griffith)
  - Hard Luck (Lucky)
  - The Art of War II: Betrayal (Agent Neil Shaw)
  - Game of Death (Marcus Jones)
  - True Story (Carlton)
- Will Smith
  - Bad Boys (Detective Lieutenant Mike Lowrey)
  - Bad Boys II (Detective Lieutenant Mike Lowrey)
  - Bad Boys for Life (Detective Lieutenant Mike Lowrey)
  - Bad Boys: Ride or Die (Detective Lieutenant Mike Lowrey)
- 2 Fast 2 Furious (2006 TV Asahi edition) (Tej Parker (Ludacris))
- An Alan Smithee Film: Burn Hollywood Burn (Leon Brothers (Chuck D))
- Albino Alligator (Law (William Fichtner))
- The Art of War III: Retribution (Agent Neil Shaw (Treach))
- Blackjack (1998 TV Asahi edition) (Don Tragle (Andrew Jackson))
- Cedar Rapids (Ronald Wilkes (Isiah Whitlock Jr.))
- Dead Heat (1992 Fuji TV edition) (Wilcox (Chip Heller))
- Event Horizon (Captain Miller (Laurence Fishburne))
- Ghostbusters (1984) (1999 DVD edition) (Winston Zeddemore (Ernie Hudson))
- Ghostbusters (2016) (Bill Jenkins (Ernie Hudson))
- Ghostbusters: Frozen Empire (Winston Zeddemore (Ernie Hudson))
- Heaven's Prisoners (Victor Romero (Hawthorne James))
- Lord of War (André Baptiste Sr. (Eamonn Walker))
- Nope (Otis Haywood Sr. (Keith David))
- RoboCop (Alex Murphy / RoboCop (Peter Weller))
- The Rock (1999 NTV edition) (Captain Darrow (Tony Todd))
- The Secret Life of Walter Mitty (Pilot (Ólafur Darri Ólafsson))
- Shanghai Noon (Lo Fong (Roger Yuan))
- Sicario (Alejandro Gillick (Benicio del Toro))
- Sicario: Day of the Soldado (Alejandro Gillick (Benicio del Toro))
- Simon Sez (Simon (Dennis Rodman))
- Timecop (Agent Max Walker (Jean-Claude Van Damme))
- Universal Soldier: The Return (SETH (Michael Jai White))

==== Animation ====
- Cloudy with a Chance of Meatballs (Manny)
