= Moguri Mod =

2018 mod

- Composer(s): Pontus Hultgren
- Platform(s): Microsoft Windows
- Release: 2018
- Genre(s): Mod

Moguri Mod is a fan-made mod for the Steam version of the video game Final Fantasy IX. It uses AI upscaling and hands-on work to remaster the backgrounds, cutscenes and textures of the game, based on the graphics of the original PlayStation version, as well as adding other graphical features and a remastered soundtrack composed by Pontus Hultgren. While the game's official remaster uses a simple upscale and noise removal to make the backgrounds HD, this caused significant loss of detail, whereas Moguri Mod retains the detail using a more advanced algorithm. Its most recent version is 9.0, released in 2024.

== Background and development ==
Square Enix's attempt to remaster the original Final Fantasy IX was hampered by a lack of backups for the original background artwork prior to being downscaled to fit on a PlayStation disc, besides a select few artists who kept their own work. This forced the developers to directly upscale the original graphics of the game, which were low resolution and dithered, causing a loss of detail that is evident in the final product. Moguri Mod was created to use a GAN (generative adversarial network) to allow for more detail than would normally be available using the source material, with layer edges also being redrawn manually.

Originally released in 2018, it was updated to version 8.3 in the 2021 "Memoria update", which added a borderless fullscreen mode to the game. After three years, it received a surprise update to version 9.0, in which all backgrounds were re-rendered using Stable Diffusion, 120 FPS and ultrawide support was added, shaders were added that could give the game's 3D models a cel-shaded or realistically shadowed look compared to their default appearance, and an option was included to swap the minigame Tetra Master to Final Fantasy VIII's Triple Triad.

== Reception ==
Wes Fenlon of PC Gamer called the original PC version of Final Fantasy IX "a decent port", but praised Moguri Mod as "going beyond just improved backgrounds to fix most of the PC port's other flaws, too". Remarking that "boy, does it look good", he criticized the mod for making some backgrounds "look a bit more like watercolor paintings than they originally did", but noted that, when compared to the original's "grainy, blurry versions", that the mod was "as good as it could possibly get". He also singled out the replacement of the game's default font with one more faithful to the original as a notable improvement, calling the original "bland" and "ill-fitting".

Brandon R. Chinn of Superjump called the mod "a striking example of what can be done to properly remaster our beloved video games". Graham Smith of Rock Paper Shotgun said that the mod looked "beautiful", calling it "FFIX as you remember it". Connor Sheridan of GamesRadar+, calling the original remaster's backgrounds "muddy blurs", said that Moguri Mod was "beautifully crisp yet fluid" in comparison. Jessica Ramey of TheGamer called the mod "yet another triumph for fans".
