= Dissidia Final Fantasy Opera Omnia =

2017 video game

- Developers: Square Enix; Team Ninja
- Publisher: Square Enix
- Series: Final Fantasy
- Platforms: iOS, Android
- Release: JP: February 1, 2017; WW: January 30, 2018
- Genre: Turn-based RPG
- Mode: Single-player

Dissidia Final Fantasy Opera Omnia was a free-to-play role-playing video game set in the Dissidia universe of fighting games. Opera Omnia was published by Final Fantasy franchise owner Square Enix, and was co-developed by Square Enix and Team Ninja, who also developed Dissidia Final Fantasy NT, for iOS and Android. Opera Omnia launched on February 1, 2017, in Japan, and was released worldwide on January 30, 2018.

Upon launch, Opera Omnia was met with a mixed critical reception; critics praised its gameplay, but were unhappy with its lack of content.

The game concluded service on February 29, 2024, on all platforms.

== Gameplay ==
Battles in the game are turn-based, with all characters being free. Characters can be enhanced with currency known as crystals, and there are daily login bonuses in the form of gems and summon tickets.

=== Playable characters ===
Dissidia Final Fantasy Opera Omnia initially featured a total of 25 playable characters upon launch, consisting of both new and returning heroes in the Dissidia Final Fantasy series. More characters were added upon constant patch updates.

Each character is assigned to one of eleven weapon classes, and is also assigned to one of six crystal colors. At the end of service, Opera Omnia had 179 and 175 characters on the Japanese and Global versions respectively.

World	Characters
Final Fantasy	Warrior of Light, Garland
Final Fantasy II	Firion, Maria, Leon, The Emperor, Guy, Leila, Minwu
Final Fantasy III	Onion Knight, Cloud of Darkness, Desch, Xande
Final Fantasy IV	Cecil Harvey (Dark Knight), Edge Geraldine, Yang Fang Leiden, Kain Highwind, Palom, Rydia, Cecil Harvey (Paladin), Rosa Joanna Farrell, Golbez, Porom, Edward Chris von Muir, Ceodore Harvey, Ursula, Fusoya, Rubicante, Leonora
Final Fantasy V	Bartz Klauser, Galuf Halm Baldesion, Faris Scherwiz, Krile Mayer Baldesion, Lenna Charlotte Tycoon, Gilgamesh, Exdeath, Dorgann Klauser, Kelger Vlondett, Xezat Matias Surgate*
Final Fantasy VI	Terra Branford, Shadow, Setzer Gabbiani, Sabin Rene Figaro, Cyan Garamonde, Edgar Roni Figaro, Celes Chere, Kefka Palazzo, Relm Arrowny, Locke Cole, Gau, Leo Cristophe, Strago Magus, Mog
Final Fantasy VII	Tifa Lockhart, Cloud Strife, Yuffie Kisaragi, Vincent Valentine, Aerith Gainsborough, Sephiroth, Cid Highwind, Zack Fair, Cait Sith, Barret Wallace, Reno, Rude, Kadaj, Shelke Rui, Cissnei, Jessie Raspberry, Weiss, Rufus Shinra*, Angeal Hewley*
Final Fantasy VIII	Laguna Loire, Squall Leonhart, Zell Dincht, Irvine Kinneas, Quistis Trepe, Raijin, Fujin, Seifer Almasy, Selphie Tilmitt, Rinoa Heartilly, Ultimecia
Final Fantasy IX	Vivi Ornitier, Zidane Tribal, Adelbert Steiner, Eiko Carol, Garnet Til Alexandros XVII, Kuja, Freya Crescent, Beatrix, Quina Quen, Amarant Coral*
Final Fantasy X	Yuna, Wakka, Tidus, Seymour Guado, Auron, Jecht, Lulu, Paine, Kimahri Ronso, Lord Braska
Final Fantasy XI	Shantotto, Prishe, Lion, Lilisette, Aphmau, Kam'lanaut, Arciela V Adoulin, Eald'narche, Iroha, Selh'teus
Final Fantasy XII	Vaan, Penelo, Balthier, Ashelia B'nargin Dalmasca, Vayne Carudas Solidor, Fran, Basch fon Ronsenburg, Judge Gabranth, Llyud, Reks
Final Fantasy XIII	Sazh Katzroy, Hope Estheim, Vanille, Snow Villiers, Lightning, Serah Farron, Oerba Yun Fang, Noel Kreiss, Caius Ballad, Cid Raines, Jihl Nabaat
Final Fantasy XIV	Y'shtola Rhul, Yda Hext, Thancred Waters, Papalymo Totolymo, Alisaie Leveilleur, Alphinaud Leveilleur, Lyse Hext
Final Fantasy XV	Noctis Lucis Caelum, Prompto Argentum, Ignis Scientia, Ardyn Izunia, Gladiolus Amicitia, Aranea Highwind, Cor Leonis, Lunafreya Nox Fleuret, Iris Amicitia
Final Fantasy Tactics	Ramza Beoulve, Agrias Oaks
Final Fantasy Type-0	Rem Tokimiya, King, Ace, Cater, Seven, Deuce, Cinque, Machina Kunagiri, Eight, Jack, Trey, Nine, Kurasame Susaya, Queen, Sice
Final Fantasy Crystal Chronicles	Layle, Yuri, Sherlotta, Ciaran, Keiss, Amidatelion, Jegran
World of Final Fantasy	Lann and Reynn, Enna Kros
Stranger of Paradise: Final Fantasy Origin	Jack Garland, Neon, Astos

Note: * = Characters who were only released on the JP server.

== Reception ==
Reception

Aggregate score
Aggregator	Score
Metacritic	(iOS) 74/100

Review scores
Publication	Score
Pocket Gamer	3.5/5
TouchArcade	4/5

According to review aggregator Metacritic, Opera Omnia received "mixed to average" reviews.

Nick Tylwalk of TouchArcade praised the game for not being a "gacha grab" and "generous" with its currency, lauding it as a good example of appropriate fan service.

Christian Colli of Multiplayer.it rated it 8/10 points, praising the combat system as fun and original, but criticizing the game's repetitiveness and lack of an Italian localization.

Harry Slater of Pocket Gamer called Opera Omnia "fairly standard" and said it would be more appealing to dedicated fans of the series.

In June 2022, Dissidia Final Fantasy Opera Omnia announced it had surpassed 10 million downloads.

== Preservation attempts ==
A user named "Hatok", in an act of preservation, recorded all the cutscenes and battle sequences from the game's story line. The upload included the canon weapons of each character, and made sure that the battle sequences included the canon characters. The project was run, maintained and supported by Hatok himself, and was finished 7 hours before the shutdown of the system. The project is about 100 hours long, and took up more than 2 terabytes of video storage.
