= Zidane Tribal =

Video game protagonist

- Final Fantasy character
- Zidane as he appears in Final Fantasy IX.
- First game: Final Fantasy IX (2000)
- Created by: Hironobu Sakaguchi
- Designed by: Yoshitaka Amano
- Voiced by: Romi Park (Japanese); Bryce Papenbrook (English)

Zidane Tribal (Japanese: ジタン・トライバル, Hepburn: Jitan Toraibaru) is a video game character in the Final Fantasy series and the main protagonist of Final Fantasy IX. He was conceived and written by Hironobu Sakaguchi, while his appearance was designed by Shuko Murase and Hideo Minaba. Like other members of the Final Fantasy IX cast, but unlike characters of previous Final Fantasy games, Zidane was designed after the plot for the game was written. Presented as a charming, puckish character, Zidane has an outgoing, seemingly self-confident and flirty personality whose mixture of bawdiness and a devil-may-care attitude helps put danger into perspective.

Zidane has appeared in the Dissidia Final Fantasy spin-off series, and in smaller roles in various spin-off Final Fantasy and crossover games. While some sources have criticized Final Fantasy IX's art style and the visual design of its characters, Zidane is mostly well received, particularly in Japan, where he is rated as one of the most popular Final Fantasy characters in fan polls. Various sources have commented on Zidane's characterization being a departure from prior Final Fantasy protagonists, who are known for being moody, as well as his relationship with Garnet, while criticism was focused on his inconsistent character arc.

== Concept and creation ==
Zidane, along with other characters, was designed after the creation of Final Fantasy IX's plot, unlike its predecessors, VII and VIII, which had its protagonists created before the story. He was one of the original three characters revealed, along with Vivi and Steiner. He was conceived and written by Hironobu Sakaguchi, while his appearance was designed by Yoshitaka Amano and re-interpreted by Toshiyuki Itahana. Both Zidane and Vivi's size and age were less than that of the characters from VII and VIII. Zidane's womanizing aspect was designed by Hiroyuki Ito. Sakaguchi described him as a person who "likes girls and doesn't care for much", lacking any real objective and being carefree, but a key character nonetheless. Kazuhiko Aoki regrets not developing how Zidane is afflicted by the difference in social status between him and Garnet, illustrating the breakdown of relations with the nobles in Treno due to their disapproval of Zidane and Garnet's relationship, Zidane butting up against the social confines he faces and the incredible power Garnet holds as royalty, and how Zidane gets back up on his feet despite everything. Aoki believes that he should have helped the team more to properly develop Zidane's characterization.

Zidane has shoulder-length blonde hair, blue eyes, and a monkey-like tail that has prehensile capabilities, as seen in game when Zidane hangs from his tail to evade Steiner. He can either use two daggers or a single swallow-blade as weapons. In trance form, Zidane's hair becomes longer, and his clothing is replaced with pink fur. Zidane is identified as a thief, and has the unique ability to steal items from enemies. As he is considered the main character of Final Fantasy IX, the stealing mechanic was made more important than in previous games, meaning that players have ample opportunity to acquire valuable items earlier than normal through stealing them from enemies.

He was redesigned by Tetsuya Nomura in the video game Dissidia Final Fantasy. As downloadable content, Nomura readapted Zidane's black clothing from the ending of Final Fantasy IX as an alternative costume. He is voiced by Romi Park and Bryce Papenbrook in the Japanese and English versions of Dissidia respectively. Papenbrook described Zidane as a "really really fun character". In particular, he enjoys voicing Zidane as, during his childhood, he used to play the Final Fantasy games as well as the Square Enix game Bravely Default. For Dissdiia NT, he particularly aims to bring a feeling of sassiness in his lines while calling him "snarky" due to his womanizing traits. He was glad during a convention where he met a cosplayer of Zidane who expressed satisfaction with his performance in his games.

== Appearances ==
=== Final Fantasy IX ===
Zidane first appears in the video game Final Fantasy IX as one of its protagonists. Prior to the events of the game, an orphaned Zidane leaves his adoptive father Baku to search for his real home, his only memory being a blue light. Unsuccessful in his search, he returns to Baku and rejoins Tantalus, his troupe of performers and criminals.

At the age of sixteen, he becomes involved in Baku's scheme to kidnap Princess Garnet Til Alexandros XVII, fomented by Regent Cid Fabool VIII of Lindblum in order to distance Garnet from her increasingly hawkish adoptive mother, Queen Brahne of Alexandria. Zidane and his cohorts travel to the kingdom of Alexandria aboard the airship Prima Vista, ostensibly to perform a theatre play as a part of their plot to kidnap Princess Garnet.

While the rest of the crew is performing the play "I Want to be Your Canary" before Queen Brahne and her citizens, Zidane uses the cover to sneak in and attempt to kidnap Garnet. He first encounters her when she tries to sneak out of the palace herself, and, at her request, promises to do his best to kidnap her. As the crew escapes from the castle aboard the Prima Vista with Garnet, the Queen's forces damage the airship, causing Zidane and his crew, along with Garnet, her stowaway bodyguard Adelbert Steiner, and the black mage Vivi, to crash-land into a magical forest full of monsters. They embark on a world-spanning adventure involving war, subterfuge, magical crystals, summoned monsters, and clones.

Zidane takes a liking to Garnet and does not hesitate to flirt with her throughout the game, much to Steiner's dismay. His dagger became the inspiration for Princess Garnet's chosen alias for herself. Zidane adapts to his role as party leader, his charisma and personality drawing in many characters throughout the game: Eiko joins the party after becoming infatuated with him, and his rival Amarant joins the party out of curiosity following his defeat by Zidane.

Later in the game, the true reason for Zidane's existence is revealed: he is a Genome, an artificially cloned humanoid. He was originally created by the wizard Garland on the planet Terra to replace his failed creation, the villain Kuja, as a more powerful "Angel of Death", whose purpose is to wipe out all life on the planet Gaia. As part of the Terrans' original plan to save their dying civilization, the young planet of Gaia was selected for assimilation. The Terrans left their physical bodies and locked their souls in Pandemonium to be watched over by Garland until the fusion's completion. The fusion was a disastrous failure, leaving Gaia's surface in ruin and Terra shifting inside it. Garland was tasked with removing the souls of Gaia's "cycle of souls" and replacing them with the souls of Terrans. The Genomes are empty, soulless vessels synthesized by Garland to eventually host the Terran souls, and he planted the Iifa Tree, a gigantic brain-like tree filtering the souls of Gaia.

Bitter and jealous that Garland had created Zidane to replace him, Kuja exiled the newly-created Zidane down to Gaia, where he was found and adopted by Baku. The revelation drives Zidane to despair and he briefly abandons the party, but returns after the group manages to mollify him. After the party is rescued from the Iifa Tree due to Kuja and it starts to collapse, Zidane chooses to go back inside to save him. For nearly a year, it is believed that he did not survive; however, he makes a dramatic reappearance on stage in Alexandria at the end of the game, reuniting with Garnet.

=== Other appearances ===
Zidane appears as the protagonist hero representing Final Fantasy IX in the Dissidia series of games: Dissidia Final Fantasy, Dissidia 012, Dissidia NT, Dissidia Opera Omnia, and Dissidia Duellum Final Fantasy. He is also featured in the rhythm game Theatrhythm Final Fantasy and Curtain Call as the main character representing Final Fantasy IX. His appearances in Final Fantasy spin-off games include Final Fantasy Record Keeper, Brave Exvius, and All the Bravest. His appearances in crossover video games include Itadaki Street Portable, Monster Strike, and Puzzle and Dragons.

== Promotion and reception ==
Zidane, along with three other protagonists of the Final Fantasy series, Cloud Strife, Squall Leonheart, and Tidus were released as figurines as part of the first volume of the Dissidia Final Fantasy Trading Arts series to celebrate the franchise's 20th anniversary. Zidane, along with Cloud, Squall, Tidus, and Lightning are part of a line of super-deformed mini figures released by Dissidia Final Fantasy Trading Arts series. Zidane was released as a figurine in Square Enix's Bring Arts line, sold as a pair along with Garnet.

Since his appearance in Final Fantasy IX, Zidane has received a generally positive reception. He is regarded by Famitsu readers as one of the best video game characters, placing #27 in the Famitsu top 50 character ranking in 2010. In 2020, NHK conducted an All-Final Fantasy Grand Poll of Japanese players, featuring over 468,000 votes. The poll results revealed that Zidane was ranked the fifth greatest Final Fantasy character by Japanese respondents, just after Vivi, who was ranked fourth. Game journalists listed him as one of the greatest Final Fantasy characters based on multiple of his traits.

Some reviewers praised the character's personality. IGN editor David Smith called him charming, and that he "breaks the streak of reluctant Final Fantasy heroes, injecting a touch of redder blood back into the series". For Zidane's appearance in Dissidia Final Fantasy, IGN editor Ryan Clements described Zidane as a "laid back, flirtatious character and one full of energy and enthusiasm", unlike his peers from other numbered entries. He adds that seeing his "short blades spin in a dizzying frenzy is definitely a sight to behold". GameSpot editor Andrew Vestal called Zidane's "instinctive womanizing" as an amusing trait of his. Jeremy Parish from Polygon thought Zidane to have "a roguish, Han Solo-like quality to him, making him something of a small fry and an outsider in a big-picture narrative that involves kingdoms at war, almighty summoned monsters and ancient races", until the manifestation of conventional Final Fantasy tropes which reveal Zidane's true cosmic origins. Lucas White from PlayStation Lifestyle noted that "his personality and motivations are drastically different from those of his peers, making him the driving force of Final Fantasy IX's unique flavor", and that at his core is "his ability to protect people he cares about; his essence is his virtue". Daniella Lucas from Gamesradar thought Zidane was "cool with his dual daggers", and noted that "Zidane's tale of adventure and self discovery while dealing with the evil that Kuja inflicts upon the world of Gaia is as classic as Final Fantasy gets". Michel S. Beaulieu, co-author of the book Final Fantasy and Philosophy: The Ultimate Walkthrough suggested that Zidane is a revolutionary, fighting against the abusive power of the upper class, represented by Queen Brahne.

Nadia Oxford from USGamer commented that she had mixed feelings about how Zidane's character is developed, in particular the Genomes and Terra reveal towards the end of the game, which she believes overlaps with Vivi's character arc. Oxford believed that there could have been an interesting contrast between Zidane and Vivi if the entire sequence was handled with a better focus; Oxford compared him to other Final Fantasy protagonists such as Terra Branford and Cloud, noting that it was typical of JRPG's from the 1990s where many characters would suffer an existential crisis upon realizing that they are not who they actually think they are. Nevertheless, Oxford is satisfied by his overall character arc, noting that the surprise reveal of Zidane's true nature does tie into the game's narrative themes. Oxford concluded that Zidane is likeable and well-developed as a character, as he eventually accepts that he is not the sum of his parts and he could find his own purpose. GameCritics editor Erin Bell called Zidane the "strangest looking Final Fantasy hero to date", citing his "nondescript features and monkey tail". However, she did describe him as a hero that is easy for one to understand and sympathize with.

Zidane also received a less positive response from some reviewers. Beaulieu described Zidane and his altruistic motto of "you don't need a reason to help people" as a "hopeless case" when judged against the Hobbesian model of moral philosophy. Chris Carter of Destructoid was of the view that Zidane as the protagonist of Final Fantasy IX is not being discussed as much as his peers from other Final Fantasy games, and expressed a personal preference for Vivi. Houston Press expressed disappointment with the story of Final Fantasy IX as he felt Garnet was more interesting as a main character than Zidane, criticizing how, besides having some unlikable traits, in the ending Zidane tries to save the main antagonist, Kuja. Scott Baird from Screen Rant echoed Oxford's view that Zidane's character arc overlaps with Vivi's, commenting that the plot twist "might not have been so bad if it wasn't also being done in a far superior manner with Vivi", and criticized the developers' decision to add "unnecessary layers of grimness" to Zidane's backstory which came out of nowhere and "doesn't really add anything to the story".

Zidane's relationship with Garnet has invited some comments from various sources. GamesRadar and Screen Rant believed that their relationship is poorly depicted, citing a lack of chemistry between the two characters and disapproved of their big-headed, childlike character design. Mia Consalvo, author of "Hot Dates and Fairy-Tale Romances" published in the book The Video Game Theory Reader, described his appearance as feminized, referencing his small stature, long hair, clothing with laces, and lack of obvious muscles. She questioned whether heterosexual players may identify less with a character like this, and whether homosexual players may. She added that his relationship with female protagonist Garnet saves him from being considered "abnormal", and that the ultimate goal is for the players to relate to Zidane as best as possible. She added that, no matter how the players proceed, Zidane always ends up forming a relationship with Garnet, and players are encouraged to insert themselves into the character as their avatar. Because of this, she questions how female and homosexual players would feel about their relationship, which she states would destroy the immersion. IGN's Leah B. Jackson was more positive towards the relationship, finding the early premise that Garnet wanted to be kidnapped by Zidane intriguing. Jason Schreier from Kotaku praised the game's final scene, in which Zidane returns to Garnet, as being particularly memorable.
