= Kuja (Final Fantasy) =

- Final Fantasy character
- Kuja in Dissidia Final Fantasy (2008)
- First game: Final Fantasy IX (2000)
- Designed by: Yoshitaka Amano; Toshiyuki Itahana
- Voiced by: EN: JD Cullum; JA: Akira Ishida

Kuja is a fictional character and the main antagonist of the 2000 video game Final Fantasy IX. A member of the same race as the protagonist, Zidane. He exhibits narcissistic and egomaniacal traits, with his plot at first being to overthrow his creator, and then to destroy all life. He appears in other games, such as Dissidia Final Fantasy. His concept art was created by Yoshitaka Amano, which was later reimagined by Toshiyuki Itahana.

Kuja has been the subject of commentary from both critics and fans. In particular, his sexuality and gender have been discussed, as his outfit and mannerisms accord with effeminate stereotypes. Despite him not being shown to be gay or transgender, he has been interpreted as a queer character, particularly through the lens of queer people being villains. His fear of mortality was also the subject of discussion.

== Concept and creation ==
Kuja was created for the video game Final Fantasy IX. His concept art was designed by Yoshitaka Amano, whose work was eventually reimagined into the game by Toshiyuki Itahana. Kuja is an egomaniacal person who exhibits narcissistic traits, with his primary goal being to manipulate others in order to eventually get the power to overthrow his creator.

== Appearances ==
Kuja appears in Final Fantasy IX as its main antagonist, having been created by a man named Garland with the intention of having him replace the souls of Gaia's inhabitants with the souls of the inhabitants of Terra. Kuja's plot to pull this off involved eliminating threats, as well as manipulate various powers to his own end. Kuja was designed to have only a limited lifespan, and thus Kuja plotted to find the four shards of a powerful entity, an Eidolon called Alexander, to overthrow Garland. He also produced a variety of Black Mages to serve as his soldiers using a mist produced by the Iifa Tree, including a prototype Black Mage called Vivi. These Black Mages were offered to Queen Brahne of Alexandria, who uses them to conquer other kingdoms.

Kuja is encountered by the protagonist, Zidane, along with other characters in Burmecia, sometime after he and the general Beatrix destroyed it. Later, Kuja suggests to Brahne that she extract Eidolons hidden in the princess, Garnet, who turns out to be a summoner, a race of people able to control Eidolons. Brahne agrees, using one of the Eidolons to destroy Cleyra, where the survivors of Burmecia fled to. Learning about Kuja's role in supplying Brahne with weapons, the protagonists intend to pursue him and preventing him from supplying her with more weapons.

Brahne, having decided she doesn't need Kuja anymore, attempts to kill him with the Eidolon Bahamut, but Kuja takes control of Bahamut using the airship Invincible, using it to kill Brahne instead. He then brings Bahamut to kill Garnet, the new queen, but Garnet and fellow summoner Eiko, having found the four crystals of Alexander, summon it, destroying Bahamut. Kuja attempts to use the Invincible to take control of Alexander, but Garland, aware of his plans, forces the Invincible to destroy Alexander and Alexandria, leaving Kuja without an Eidolon to control.

Zidane and his allies pursue Kuja, but they are captured, with Kuja vowing to free Zidane's friends if he retrieves an artifact. However, Kuja attempts to kill his friends anyway while Zidane is retrieving it, but they are able to escape. Zidane returns with the artifact, and Kuja escapes with Eiko in tow, planning but failing to extract her Eidolons. To protect Eiko, her Moogle enters "Trance," a transformation that empowers a person, which causes Kuja to realize that, instead of using Eidolons, he could use Trance instead to defeat Garland.

The group pursue Kuja once again to the planet Terra, where Zidane learns that both he and Kuja are artificial lifeforms called Genomes. Zidane and friends manage to defeat Garland after he attempted to take Zidane's soul, allowing Kuja to usurp Garland. Kuja then enters Trance, using the souls captive on the Invincible to do so, and defeats Zidane and friends. In his final moments, Garland tells Kuja that he was only meant to serve as an Angel of Death until Zidane matured, at which point he would have been replaced. This drives Kuja mad, and he decides that the world wouldn't be allowed to exist without him, destroying Terra in the process, but not before the heroes and the Genomes they saved are able to escape.

Kuja is later found at the Iifa Tree at the source of all life, the Crystal. Zidane and Kuja battle, only for Kuja to take the heroes down with him when defeated. Because of Kuja's fear of mortality leading him to destroy life, an entity called Necron appears, who attempts to destroy existence as an act of mercy. After Necron is defeated, Kuja uses his power to return the heroes outside the Iifa Tree; however, Zidane stays behind to save him. Kuja takes solace in the knowledge that he saved Zidane's friends, and that he caused the Genomes to have hope in the future before dying.

Kuja has also appeared in other video games, including Dissidia Final Fantasy, where he is one of its playable villains, opposite Zidane who represents Final Fantasy IX as a playable hero.

== Reception ==
Kuja has received generally positive reception, described by Meristation writer Eduardo Granado as among the most manipulative and intelligent enemies in the series. In contrast to other Final Fantasy villains, Kotaku writer Jason Schreier felt that he was not as "devilish" as Sephiroth or Kefka but still held his own. Nintendojo writer Katharine Byrne considered Kuja a tragic villain due to his fear of mortality and the nature of his existence, criticizing the game for following Kuja's final boss fight with the fight against Necron. She felt that Necron's role in the story took away from the catharsis of Kuja's arc. Destructoid writer James Stephanie Sterling, while noting how "camp and effete" male characters in Final Fantasy could be, Kuja "effortlessly" outdoes them. They describe his appearance as that of a drag queen and suggested that he could "bed any man without turning them gay." While discussing how Final Fantasy IX is designed to be more like live theater than cinema, Fanbyte writer Nate Ewert-Krocker felt that Kuja was the most theatrical of the entire cast. He noted how, while Kuja's "egomaniacal faff" was meant to make people dislike his pompous personality, it also leaned into the elements of theater.

His identity has been the subject of discussion by critics. Destructoid writer Joseph Leray discussed how much emphasis Final Fantasy IX puts on the "friction between outer appearances and inner truths," citing how Kuja struggles with his origin as a living weapon. However, he felt that it was "abstract and reductionist" to view him in that light, suggesting that it "understates the complexities of his character." Rather than being a literal weapon, Leray argued that Kuja's real power comes in his ability to manipulate those around him in order to succeed in his plans. Writers Anderson Canafistula, Luter Nobre, and Levi Bayde discussed Kuja, alongside other Final Fantasy IX characters, as moral lessons, particularly with respect to understanding one's self and accepting one's mortality. They discussed how Kuja's fear of death, particularly how he is unable to conceive the notion of "immortality in essence," arguing that he has narcissistic tendencies that lead to his decisions regarding mortality.

Kuja's gender and sexuality were the subject of discussion by online fans. Writer Gaspard Pelurson discussed Kuja through a queer lens, suggesting that Western perceptions of Kuja's sexuality are problematic because they are a misunderstanding of Japanese gender presentation. Despite Kuja not being queer himself, Pelurson considered him a "quintessential queer villain" who "attacks symbols of heteronormativity," calling him among the "most androgynous" villain in the series. Pelurson found Kuja admirable, feeling that his death was "tragic and unfair" due to his redeeming qualities. Pelurson also argued that Kuja had more "diverse queer politics" than an openly gay character, such as Dorian Pavus from Dragon Age: Inquisition. The Daily Dot writer Jack Flanagan felt that Kuja was a "more dated version of the typified sexual minority," citing his campiness, nihilism, and theatricality. He also stated that Kuja fits into a tradition of the series of contrasting male characters, where a game will have "masculine mentors or father-figures; young, starry-eyed heroes; and camp theatre-villains."
