= Characters of Final Fantasy IX =

The main playable characters of Final Fantasy IX, from left: Quina, Freya, Eiko, Garnet, Zidane, Steiner, Vivi, and Amarant.

Final Fantasy IX, a PlayStation role-playing game consisting of four CD-ROMs, features a cast containing various major and minor characters. Players control a maximum of four characters for combat at once, with eight main playable characters in the party and other, temporary characters, the names of the character's listed in this article are their official names, though the names of the main playable characters can be changed by the player.

== Concept and creation ==
The main characters were based on the character class archetypes from previous Final Fantasy games. Zidane is based on the Thief class, while Steiner is based on the Knight class. Each character in Final Fantasy IX has a unique ability; these include summoning, black magic, white magic, blue magic, and techniques such as "Jump". The characters were designed after the creation of Final Fantasy IX's plot, unlike its predecessors VII and VIII, which had their protagonists created before the story. Both Zidane and Vivi's size and age were made to be less than the characters from these titles. Zidane was one of the original three characters to be revealed, along with Vivi and Steiner.

Original concepts and designs were created by Toshiyuki Itahana, Shūkō Murase, Hideo Minaba and Shin Nagasawa.The game's character designs were meant to strike a balance between realism and a comic-like style, while taking inspiration from the style employed for the characters in The Dark Crystal.

== Main playable characters ==
=== Zidane Tribal ===
Zidane Tribal (ジタン・トライバル, Jitan Toraibaru; /zɪˈdɑːn/) is the main protagonist of Final Fantasy IX. He was conceived and written by Hironobu Sakaguchi. The womanizing aspect of his character was conceived by Hiroyuki Ito. Sakaguchi described him as a person who "likes girls and doesn't care for much", lacking any real objective and being carefree, but a key character nonetheless. Zidane has shoulder-length blonde hair, blue eyes, and a prehensile monkey-like tail, as shown in game when he uses it to evade Steiner. He wields either two daggers or a single swallow-blade. Zidane is identified as a thief, and has the unique ability to steal items from enemies. He assists in the kidnapping of Garnet, who goes willingly, as she desires to escape the kingdom. He takes an instant liking to her and does not hesitate to flirt with her throughout the game. Near the end of the game, it is revealed that Zidane is a Genome created on the planet Terra to replace the antagonist Kuja as a more powerful "Angel of Death".

=== Vivi Ornitier ===
Vivi Ornitier (ビビ・オルニティア, Bibi Orunitia) first appears at the beginning of the game, becoming embroiled in Tantalus's plan to kidnap Princess Garnet when he travels to Alexandria to attend a performance of the play I Want to be Your Canary. Vivi's appearance is based on the black mage characters from previous Final Fantasy games. He wears a blue outfit and a tall hat, and has no facial features beyond a set of yellow eyes. He joins with Zidane and others, and later discovers others like him, later learning that they are mindless, manufactured foot soldiers created by Kuja. He continues to search for the truth about his origins and point in life, as well as what makes him different from others like him, such as his ability to express emotions. In the Black Mage Village he discovers, he eventually learns that Black Mages live for only one year, though that Vivi may be a prototype with a longer lifespan. In the ending, it is implied that he eventually died, having multiple Black Mage children.

=== Adelbert Steiner ===
Adelbert Steiner (アデルバート・スタイナー, Aderubāto Sutainā) is the Captain of the Knights of Pluto, the only group of male soldiers in Alexandria's military force. Steiner is unusual amongst Final Fantasy characters in that while the game allows the player to choose his name, the chosen name becomes his surname instead of his first name. For instance, if the player entered the name "Steve", he would be called "Captain Adelbert Steve". This also makes him one of the few Final Fantasy characters to be called by both the first and last name given in the game's manual during actual gameplay.

Steiner wears a full suit of heavy armour throughout the game, giving him a bulky appearance. His armour is often remarked on by others, such as when Zidane refers to him as "Rusty" early on in the game. Steiner only seems to mind this once, though his armour never actually appears damaged or ill-maintained.

Steiner meets Zidane and the Tantalus group during their performance of the play I Want to be Your Canary. He follows the Tantalus group after their "kidnapping" of Princess Garnet because of his oath to protect her from danger. He joins forces with Zidane, whom he hates due to being a thief, but is willing to put up with just about anything to ensure Garnet's safety. When the party learns of the Queen's role in the attacks on Burmecia, Steiner questions his loyalty, as he does not believe such horrible deeds could be committed by the person he dedicated his life to defending. He resolves this conflict by transferring his loyalty fully to Garnet.

Despite his grouchy demeanor and disdain for most members of the group, Steiner has a humble respect for Vivi, admiring his magical abilities and referring to him as "Master Vivi". When both Steiner and Vivi are in the party, Steiner has access to the Magic Sword ability, which allow Vivi to charge Steiner's sword with the power of his black magic abilities, although MP consumption is limited to Steiner alone.

Steiner's love interest is his ex-rival, General Beatrix, which occurs as a result of Eiko's failed love letter to Zidane, presented in a comedy of errors fashion. As the game progresses, Steiner's experiences and resolution of personal conflicts allow his personality to soften somewhat towards the end and he is able to form not only a respectful friendship with Zidane but also a relationship with Beatrix.

=== Garnet Til Alexandros XVII / Dagger ===
Garnet Til Alexandros XVII (ガーネット・ティル・アレクサンドロス17世, Gānetto tiru Arekusandorosu Jūnanasei), is the heroine of Final Fantasy IX. She is the Princess of Alexandria, one of four major nations located on the Mist Continent, and the only heir to the royal throne. She attempts to escape from the kingdom due to her concerns about her mother's actions and behavior, joining with Zidane during Zidane's kidnapping attempt of her. They head toward Lindblum. with Garnet assuming the alias "Dagger" to disguise herself. During their travels, she is hunted by her mother, who sends beings called Black Waltzes to retrieve her. Garnet later learns that she was a summoner, being adopted as the Princess of Alexandria and repressing her memories of childhood, and her Eidolons are extracted by Zorn and Thorn, though she regains the ability to summon them later. She becomes Queen after Brahne's death, with Brahne apologizing for having become the person she did, having fallen under Kuja's influence.

=== Amarant Coral ===
Amarant Coral is the last character to join the party. His name in the Japanese version of the game is Salamander Coral (サラマンダー・コーラル, Saramandā Kōraru), a possible reference to the Salamander's portrayal in mythology, as he is known as "The Flaming Amarant" ("The Flaming Salamander"). In the game, Amarant is also known as "Red" and "Scarlet Hair" in his introductory battle. He fights using gloves or knuckles, like the monk character class in other Final Fantasy games, but also possesses the "Throw" command, which is normally associated with the ninja class. He holds a grudge against Zidane, the reasons of which are initially undisclosed. Amarant's combative nature and arrogant attitude often leads to conflict, but eventually his personality begins to change as a result of Zidane's influence.

Amarant lives by a harsh code where "only the strong survive", and finds meaning in life through combat. Very little is revealed regarding his extended past; even he can only recall that his first real memory is "of the face of a guy I had to fight". The warrior he wanted to challenge was Zidane, but he never got the chance to until meeting him in Madain Sari while tracking down Garnet alongside Lani. Lani seems to have a crush on him, but Amarant is seemingly unaware of this.

Amarant's reputation as a fighter made him feared in Treno, so King, the owner of one of Treno's waterfront mansions and auction house, hired him as a security guard. When Zidane raids the mansion, he frames Amarant, who becomes a wanted man with a considerable bounty on his head. This is shown in the inn in Treno, where a wanted poster of him can be seen. Amarant does not divulge this information until a conversation with Freya outside the auction house in Disc 3, and keeps the reasoning for his grudge towards Zidane, who does not remember him, secret for a significant portion of the game. Afterwards, Amarant works as a mercenary for hire. Queen Brahne later summons him to retrieve Princess Garnet's pendant and assassinate Vivi, and he takes the job after learning that Zidane is traveling with them. Another bounty hunter, Lani, arrives first and holds Eiko hostage, demanding that Garnet relinquish the pendant. Compelled by a sense of fairness, Amarant ambushes the pair and saves Eiko. He challenges Lani, who gives up the pendant and retreats. He then duels with Zidane; after losing the fight, he returns the pendant and demands that Zidane deliver the finishing blow. Zidane refuses, and, confused by his mercy, Amarant decides to follow him to understand his power.

While with the party, Amarant remains aloof and dismissive, to the point of not performing a victory dance after battle. His "lone wolf" persona culminates during the raid on Ipsen's Castle, where he seeks to prove that working alone "beats working in a team any day", and sets off in search of a set of mirrors alone. After finding the mirrors, Amarant falls and nearly dies; he is saved by Zidane, who had re-entered the castle after making it out with the party, but noticed that Amarant had not. Amarant is again confused by Zidane's willingness to help him, and his personality gradually begins to change under Zidane's influence, as after this he begins to perform a victory dance after battles. On Terra, Amarant concludes that "blind pursuit of power is a meaningless vice".

=== Freya Crescent ===
Freya Crescent (フライヤ・クレセント, Furaiya Kuresento; /ˈfraɪə/) is Burmecian, a race of anthropomorphic rats who mainly live in the cities of Burmecia and Cleyra. Her class is Dragon Knight. Hailing from Burmecia, she is met by Zidane in Lindblum during the Festival of the Hunt, joining his quest after they finish their competition. She travels to Cleyra, which is under attack by Alexandria, where she meets her love Sir Fratley, but discovered that he lost his memory. She later travels to Burmecia, which was also attacked and destroyed by Alexandria. By the end, she reunites with Fratley, working to help reconstruct Burmecia.

=== Quina Quen ===
Quina Quen (クイナ・クゥエン, Kuina Kūen) is an eighty-nine-year-old Qu of indeterminate gender. Despite being given the pronoun of "s/he", they have masculine pronouns such as "him" and "his" attributed to them, giving the impression they are male. They live primarily in the Mist Continent's Qu's Marsh. Their master, Quale, wants Quina to travel the world so that they will learn that there is more to life than food. Like the rest of the Qu Tribe, Quina speaks in broken English. Quina's unique ability is called Blue Magic, or Blu Magic in the battle menu, which allows them to use enemy abilities acquired in battle by using the Eat command on certain enemies. Quina's philosophy is that there are only two things: "things you can eat and things you no can eat". Their favorite food is frogs. Quina is separated from the rest of the party at several points in the game.

During Disc 1 of the game, Quina is an optional character. They join the party in the first disc if the player travels to Qu's Marsh near the Lindblum Dragon's Gate. If the player does not recruit Quina here, they can be recruited in the same place during Disc 2, at which point having them in the party is mandatory requirement to find a way to get to the Outer Continent and progress through the game.

Quina's motive for joining the party is not out of a desire to save the world, but rather as an opportunity to taste different foods from all around Gaia. As a result, they do not hold a particularly high interest in the events that unfold during the course of the story, unless food is involved. Despite this, they fight alongside Zidane and the rest of the party to achieve their goal of saving it from Brahne and Kuja.

Later in the game, Zidane, Vivi, and Quina can visit Quan's dwelling, where Quina will see a whole room of nonexistent food. Upon moving outside, Quina, Vivi, and Quale meet with Quan's ghost, which Zidane cannot see. Quan commends both Vivi and Quina for their imaginations and reprimands Quale for seeing the world too literally. It is at this point that Quina fully understands what they have gotten out of traveling with Zidane and decides that they want to travel the world in search of "yummy-yummies". Quina's role in the rest of the game is limited to a secondary role except in the ending, where they are seen in the kitchen of Alexandria Castle, preparing a feast for Garnet's seventeenth birthday celebration.

=== Eiko Carol ===
Eiko Carol (エーコ・キャルオル, Ēko Kyaruoru) is one of the playable characters that joins the party in the second disc of the game. She is the only person who appears in the game with a Summoner's Horn. While Eiko and Garnet both share White Magic and Summoner abilities, Eiko primarily uses white magic and her summoner powers taking a secondary role, as indicated by the order of her skills on the battle menu. Her summon abilities are usually holy-based summons or summons that add supporting effects. Some examples are Phoenix, which revives unconscious party members, and Madeen, which deals Holy damage.

She is a six-year-old girl and one of the two last surviving Summoners of Madain Sari, the other being Garnet. Eiko's family was not in Madain Sari when it was destroyed, and returned to its ruins four years later when Eiko was young. Eiko's parents died when she was three years old, leaving her grandfather to raise her, but he died when she was five years old. Following his death, the moogles in the area took her in. She became very mature for her age and helped them, stealing food from the nearby village of Conde Petie for them when needed. Zidane and the rest of the party find her caught in a tree after she fled the scene of one of her thefts. After helping her get down, she shows them Madain Sari and decides to join the party, despite her grandfather having told her not to leave until she was sixteen. Eiko develops a crush on Zidane, and considers Garnet to be her rival for his affections, though gives up her pursuit of him after learning that Zidane's true affections lie mainly with Garnet.

Eiko has a guardian female moogle named of Mog. During an extraction of Eiko's eidolons, Mog goes into a trance to protect Eiko and transforms into Madeen. After the battle, she gives Eiko the ribbon she wore so she can summon her at will. After defeating Kuja, one of the final scenes in the game shows Eiko referring to Cid and Hilda as her parents. Although the Regent had never established an adoption, his wife, Hilda, acknowledges it.

In World of Final Fantasy, she is voiced by Hisako Kanemoto in Japanese and Michaela Jill Murphy in English.

== Antagonists ==
=== Kuja ===
Kuja (クジャ) is the main antagonist of Final Fantasy IX who serves as a gunrunner for the kingdom of Alexandria. He was the first Genome with a soul to serve as an angel of death, created by Garland on Terra. He was designed to not live long, and was intended to be replaced by Zidane, whom he abandoned on Gaia to prevent this. He wreaked havoc on Gaia, hoping to overthrow Garland and Zidane and inciting war on the planet. He also manipulated Queen Brahne, offering her weapons called Black Mages, including more powerful ones called Black Waltzes, to accomplish this. When he tried to obtain the Eidolon Alexander to kill Garland, Garland prevented this, causing Kuja to seek a more powerful Eidolon by kidnapping the summoner Eiko Carol to extract her Eidolons. He realizes the power of Trance when her Moogle protects her by entering it, seeking that power instead. He kills Garland, but not before Garland tells him he has a limited lifespan, causing Kuja to panic and destroy Terra. He finds it unfair that he will die, and thus decides to kill all life. He destroys the crystal that life originates from, and is ultimately defeated by Zidane. The destruction of the crystal leads to the being Necron to deem that people crave death. After defeating him, Kuja teleports them out of danger, but Zidane returns to save him, causing Kuja to rethink life.

=== Queen Brahne ===
Brahne (ブラネ, Burane) is the queen of Alexandria and Garnet's adoptive mother. As Garnet testifies several times throughout the game, she was formerly a kind and well-liked ruler of the kingdom, but eventually becomes cruel, particularly when a man called Kuja shows up, revealed to have been talked into waging war with an army of Black Mages and having Zorn and Thorn extract the Eidolons from Garnet before executing her. After successfully extracting the Eidolons but failing to execute Garnet, she uses various Eidolons to attack neighboring countries and kill Kuja, though he mortally wounds her in the process. She dies in Garnet's arms, asking Garnet for her forgiveness.

=== Beatrix ===
Beatrix is a general and head of the army of Alexandria, loyal to Queen Brahne and leading her army against the neighboring kingdoms. While she begins as an antagonist to the party, she switches sides to protect the Princess Garnet, fighting alongside Freya and Steiner to help them escape. After Brahne's death, she serves under the newly crowned Queen Garnet, and she and Steiner grow to develop feelings for one another. She helps the group by captaining the Red Rose, which defends the group as it enters the final area of the game.

=== Garland ===
Garland (ガーランド, Gārando) was made leader of Terra when its original inhabitants went into their 'Deep Sleep'. He is responsible for overseeing the Genomes and creating the three "Angels of Death": Kuja, Zidane, and Mikoto. He was also responsible for the destruction of Madain Sari. Garland is defeated at Pandemonium by Zidane and his party, only to be confronted by Kuja. Garland is too weak to fight back against him and is thrown to his death. However, his spirit lives on and assists the party during their journey through Memoria.

=== Necron ===
Necron (永遠の闇, Eien no Yami; lit. Eternal Darkness) is the game's final boss. It is a multi-dimensional being that appears after Trance Kuja destroys the crystal, the source of life. With the crystal's destruction, Necron decides to proceed with its original task to return all existence to a "zero world", a world where nothing exists and there is no pain or sorrow. It is ultimately defeated by Zidane and the party, yet vows that it will exist as long as life does.

A version of Necron appears as a boss in Final Fantasy XIV: Dawntrail. A primal manifestation of death, it is summoned by Calyx, a scientist working to accelerate human evolution by converting citizens of the city of Alexandria into virtual beings. Necron is summoned through the fears and worries of Alexandrians to harness their aether, a supernatural substance that is the source of life and magic. Necron is ultimately defeated by the player character and their companions.

== Reception and legacy ==
Venture Beat praised the game's attention to character, and its use of humor not as an opportunity for "jokes", but to reveal character and allow players to connect with the characters when the story becomes more dramatic. "Active Time Events" were often used when players entered new cities, which was praised for regularly offering up character development. Some of the characters have very well developed plot arcs, such as Zidane, Garnet, and Vivi, while others such as Amarant are less so. Polygon notes that the cast of Final Fantasy IX strives for justice and peace at any cost, unlike later games that tend to glamorize the violence and seem to regard violence as inevitable and good.

Digital Spy rated the game the second best Final Fantasy, citing "lovable characters and hatable villains" as one of their reasons. In a poll of Japan's favorite Final Fantasy characters, Vivi and Zidane were number four and five. The characters of FFIX were featured in a television advertisement for Coca-Cola in Japan.
