= Final Fantasy IX =

2000 video game

- North American box art showing (from left): Garnet, Vivi, Steiner, Zidane, and Amarant
- Developer: Square
- Publishers: JP: Square; NA: Square Electronic Arts; EU: Square Europe; WW: Square Enix (Note: Published Android, iOS, Windows, PlayStation 4, Nintendo Switch, and Xbox One versions)
- Director: Hiroyuki Ito
- Producers: Hironobu Sakaguchi; Shinji Hashimoto
- Designers: Kazuhiko Aoki; Yasushi Kurosawa
- Programmer: Hiroshi Kawai
- Artists: Hideo Minaba; Shūkō Murase; Toshiyuki Itahana
- Writer: Hironobu Sakaguchi
- Composer: Nobuo Uematsu
- Series: Final Fantasy
- Platforms: PlayStation; Android; iOS; Windows; PlayStation 4; Nintendo Switch; Xbox One
- Release: July 7, 2000: PlayStation; JP: July 7, 2000; NA: November 14, 2000; EU: February 16, 2001; Android, iOS; WW: February 10, 2016; Windows; WW: April 14, 2016; PlayStation 4; WW: September 19, 2017; Switch, Xbox One; WW: February 13, 2019
- Genre: Role-playing
- Modes: Single-player, multiplayer

Final Fantasy IX (Note: Japanese: ファイナルファンタジーIX, Hepburn: Fainaru Fantajī Nain) is a 2000 role-playing video game developed and published by Square for the PlayStation video game console. It is the ninth game in the main Final Fantasy series. The plot focuses on a war between nations in a medieval fantasy world called Gaia. Players follow a thief named Zidane Tribal who kidnaps princess Garnet Til Alexandros XVII as part of a ploy by the neighboring nation of Lindblum. He joins Garnet and a growing cast of characters on a quest to take down her mother, Queen Brahne of Alexandria, who started the war, while uncovering the various reasons behind it.

Game development occurred in parallel with Final Fantasy VIII. Envisioned by developers as a retrospective for the series, it departed from the futuristic settings of Final Fantasy VI, VII, and VIII by returning to the medieval style of the earlier games. Consequently, it draws heavy influence from the original Final Fantasy and features allusions to the rest of the series. The game introduced new features to the series despite this approach, such as "Active Time Event" cutscenes, "Mognet", and skill systems. Final Fantasy IX was the last game in the main series whose music was composed solely by Nobuo Uematsu.

Considered one of the greatest games of all time, Final Fantasy IX was released to critical acclaim and commercial success, selling 8.9 million copies by March 2025. It was re-released in 2010 as a PS1 Classic on the PlayStation Store—this version was compatible with PlayStation 3 and PlayStation Portable; PlayStation Vita support arrived in 2012. In 2016 Square Enix released a remastered version featuring minor gameplay and graphical enhancements, which would be released on several platforms. An animated series adaptation by Square Enix and Cyber Group Studios was announced in 2021.

== Gameplay ==
The field icon indicates an object is inspectable, such as this ticket booth.

In Final Fantasy IX, the player navigates a character through the game world, exploring areas and interacting with non-player characters. Most of the game occurs on "field screens" consisting of pre-rendered backgrounds representing towns and dungeons. To aid exploration on the field screen, Final Fantasy IX introduces the "field icon", an exclamation mark appearing over the lead character's head, indicating a point of interest. Players speak with Moogles to record their progress, recover their energy, and purchase items. An extensive optional quest involves sending and receiving letters from Moogles and other non-playable characters via Mognet, an in-game postal service.

Players journey between field screen locations on the world map, a three-dimensional representation of Final Fantasy IX's world presented from a top-down perspective. Players can freely navigate around the world map unless restricted by obstacles such as bodies of water or mountain ranges. To traverse these impediments, players can ride chocobos, sail on a boat, or pilot airships. Like previous Final Fantasy games, players enter battles caused by random encounters with enemies while traveling across the world map or hostile field screens. Final Fantasy IX offers a new approach to town exploration with Active Time Events (ATE). These allow the player to view events unfolding at different locations, providing character development, unique items, and prompts for story-altering decisions. ATEs are occasionally used to simultaneously control two teams when the party divides to solve puzzles and navigate mazes.

=== Combat and character progression ===
In this early boss battle, Steiner attacks the enemy while Zidane awaits the player's menu input.

When the player encounters an enemy, the map changes to a battle screen. The player issues commands to characters from an on-screen menu on the battle screen, including physically attacking, using items from the inventory, and unique character-specific abilities that define their role in battle. For example, the thief Zidane can steal items, Eiko and Garnet can summon "eidolons" to aid the party, and Vivi can use black magic to damage the opposition. The speed and order in which the characters and enemies take their turn varies according to their agility, an implementation of the Active Time Battle system first featured in Final Fantasy IV. Character-specific commands change when the character goes into "Trance mode", which is activated for a short duration when the character sustains a specified amount of damage similar to the Limit Breaks in Final Fantasy VII. Trance mode amplifies the character's strength and allows the player to select more powerful attack commands. For example, Vivi's "Black Magic" command changes into "Double Black", allowing him to cast two magic spells at once. Winning battles awards money, items, "experience points", and "ability points".

Experience points determine a character's combat attributes like agility, strength, and magical power. Accumulating sufficient experience points results in a "level up", which permanently increases combat attributes. Equipment worn by a character may also amplify their attributes. Certain weapons and armor also bestow special abilities, which the character may use when equipped. When the character earns enough ability points, it becomes usable without the item equipped. There are two types of abilities: action and support. Action abilities require magic points to use and include magical spells and special moves used in battle. Support abilities provide functions that are automatically enabled in battle, such as increasing power against certain types of enemies. The maximum number of effects characters can equip at once is determined by each character's Magic Stones.

== Plot ==
=== Setting and characters ===
Final Fantasy IX takes place primarily in a world named Gaia. Most of Gaia's population lives on the Mist Continent, named after the thick Mist that blankets the lowlands. Large mountain ranges act as natural borders that separate its four nations: Alexandria, Lindblum, Burmecia, and Cleyra. Alexandria is a warmongering monarchy that controls the eastern half of the continent. One of its cities is Treno, a cultural nexus under perpetual starlight that is home to many aristocrats and paupers alike. The technologically advanced Lindblum, a hub of airship travel, is nestled on a plateau to the southwest. Both countries feature a mix of humans, humanoids, and anthropomorphic animals. Burmecia, a kingdom showered by endless rain, is in the northwest. Cleyra, a neighboring settlement that seceded from Burmecia due to its appreciation for war, is situated in a giant tree in the desert, protected by a sandstorm. Both are inhabited by anthropomorphic rats with a fondness for dance and spear fighting.

Players eventually explore the Outer, Lost, and Forgotten Continents as well. Civilizations on the Outer Continent include Conde Petie, home of the dwarves; Black Mage Village, a secret settlement of sentient magician drones; and Madain Sari, once home to a near-extinct race of horned humanoid summoners who conjure powerful magical beings called eidolons. Also on the Outer Continent is the Iifa Tree, which disperses the Mist to other continents through its roots. This Mist stimulates the fighting instinct in humanoids and contributes to Gaia's bloody history. The Lost and Forgotten continents are littered mostly with ancient ruins. Scattered throughout the marshes of Gaia are the Qu: large, frog-eating, and seemingly androgynous humanoids who are considered great gourmands. Late in the game, players briefly travel to the parallel world of Terra and the dream realm of Memoria.

The main playable characters are: Zidane Tribal, a member of a group of bandits called Tantalus who are masquerading as a theater troupe; Garnet Til Alexandros XVII (alias Dagger), the Princess of Alexandria who runs away with Zidane; Vivi Ornitier, a young, timid, and kind black mage with an unknown origin; Adelbert Steiner, a brash Alexandrian knight captain and loyal servant of Princess Garnet; Freya Crescent, a Burmecian dragoon searching for her lost love; Quina Quen, a Qu whose master wants them to travel the world so that they will learn about cuisine; Eiko Carol, a young girl living in Madain Sari who is one of the last summoners; and Amarant Coral, a bounty hunter hired to return Garnet to Alexandria. Other important characters include Cid Fabool, the charismatic Regent of Lindblum; Brahne, Garnet's adoptive mother and the power-hungry Queen of Alexandria; Beatrix, the general of Alexandria's all-female army; Garland, an elderly Terran male tasked with saving his world; and antagonist Kuja, an arms dealer and pawn of Garland who questions his own existence.

=== Story ===
In Alexandria, Zidane and Tantalus kidnap Princess Garnet by order of Cid. Garnet does not resist, for she was already planning to flee to Lindblum and warn Cid of Queen Brahne's increasingly erratic behavior. (Note: Garnet: I am actually ... Princess Garnet til Alexandros, heir to the throne of Alexandria. I have a favor I wish to ask of you ... I wish to be kidnapped ...right away.) Vivi and Steiner join the party during the escape. En route to Lindblum, the group discovers that Brahne is manufacturing soulless black mage soldiers that look similar to Vivi. In Lindblum, Cid confirms that he hired the group to protect Garnet from Brahne's newfound aggression. After learning that Alexandria has invaded Burmecia with the black mages, Zidane and Vivi join Freya to investigate. Garnet and Steiner secretly return to Alexandria to reason with Brahne. (Note: Dagger: I have to help Mother ... I don't want to see anything happen to her ... / Steiner: Very well. Princess, I will follow you wherever you choose.)

Zidane's team finds that the Alexandrian forces, headed by Beatrix, conquered Burmecia with help from Kuja and the refugees have fled to Cleyra. Brahne imprisons Garnet, extracts her eidolons, (Note: Queen Brahne: Zorn, Thorn! Prepare to extract the eidolons from Garnet.) and uses the eidolon Odin to destroy Cleyra while Zidane's group defends the city. The party escapes on Brahne's airship, rendezvous with Steiner, and rescues Garnet. Meanwhile, Brahne cripples Lindblum with another eidolon, Atomos. (Note: Minister Artania: Yes, Princess. The castle was spared. Regent Cid is alive.) Cid explains that Kuja supplies Brahne with black mages and the knowledge to use eidolons. The party befriends Quina and tracks Kuja to the Outer Continent. (Note: Regent Cid: I believe Kuja is the only one supplying <gwok> Brahne with weapons.) (Note: Minister Artania: That he came from the north suggests he's from the Outer Continent.) Brahne hires bounty hunters Lani and Amarant to capture Garnet. On the Outer Continent, the party defeats Lani and meets Eiko, a summoner who lives with a group of moogles in the village of Madain Sari. Eiko leads Zidane and the others to the Iifa Tree. Inside, they learn that Kuja uses Mist to create the black mages and that Vivi was a prototype. (Note: Zidane: What kind of weapons did Kuja make? / Soulcage: Kuja called them black mages, dark spawn of the Mist.) The party defeats the monster that generates the Mist within the Tree, which clears it from the Mist Continent. While waiting for Kuja's reprisal at Madain Sari, Lani and Amarant attempt to kidnap Eiko but Zidane and the moogles foil them. Amarant then challenges Zidane to a duel and loses. He joins the party and Garnet learns of her heritage as a summoner who was adopted by Brahne as a child. At the Tree, Brahne attempts to kill Kuja with an eidolon so she can rule unopposed, but he takes control of it and destroys her and her army. (Note: Queen Brahne: Kuja! So you finally decided to show your girly face here! You're all that stands between me and total domination!) (Note: Kuja: Excellent, Bahamut! Power, mobility ... You truly are the best! You even hurt me ... a little. And you, Brahne ... Your tragic role in this drama now comes to an end!)

After Garnet's coronation, Kuja attacks Alexandria Castle. (Note: Kuja: What an auspicious day for Alexandria. Dagger's accession to the throne has brought hope and peace to this kingdom. The people are overjoyed; they believe a wonderful future is ahead of them ... But the celebration isn't over yet. It's time to really light things up! Your former master is here, Bahamut. Play a requiem for her and all of Alexandria!) Garnet and Eiko summon an extremely powerful eidolon in defense; Kuja attempts to steal the eidolon as a means to kill his master, Garland, but the latter arrives and destroys it. (Note: Garland: You have gone too far, Kuja. I granted you the freedom to do as you wish in Gaia for one purpose alone. Now that you have lost sight of your mission, I will no longer tolerate your actions.) (Note: Kuja: I need an eidolon more powerful than Alexander! An eidolon with the power to bury Garland! His powers are so incredible; I cannot even come close. I must destroy him before Terra's plan is activated, or my soul will no longer be my own!) The party chases Kuja through a portal to Terra, where the antagonists' goals become clear. The Terrans created Garland to merge their dying world with Gaia; Garland, in turn, created self-aware, soulless vessels called Genomes. (Note: Garland: I constructed the Genomes to be vessels for the souls of the people of Terra when they awaken.) For millennia, Garland has been using the Iifa Tree to replace deceased Gaian souls with the hibernating Terran souls, turning the former into Mist in the process; this will allow the Terrans to be reborn into the Genomes after the planetary merge. (Note: Garland: the Iifa Tree blocks the flow of Gaia's souls, while it lets those of Terra flow freely.) (Note: Garland: The role of the Iifa Tree is that of Soul Divider. The Mist you see comprises the stagnant souls of Gaia ...) Kuja and Zidane are Genomes created to accelerate this process by bringing war and chaos to Gaia. (Note: Zidane: So ... Kuja is just an angel of death who sends souls to the Tree of Iifa. / Garland: Yes, my angel of death. But only until you came of age.) Kuja had betrayed Garland to avoid becoming occupied by a Terran soul. Kuja defeats Garland, who reveals before dying that the former has a limited lifespan anyhow: Garland designed Zidane to be his replacement. (Note: Garland: There's a limit to your life ... You'll be dead soon ... Even as I die, you'll have died without ever leaving your mark on the world ...) Enraged, Kuja destroys Terra and escapes to the Iifa Tree. At the Iifa Tree, the party enters Memoria and reaches the origin of the universe: the Crystal World. They defeat Kuja, preventing him from destroying the original crystal of life and thus the universe. (Note: Kuja: It's the original crystal ... This is where it all began ... The birthplace of all things ... Once I destroy it, everything will be gone. Gaia, Terra, the universe, everything ...) After defeating Necron, a force of death, (Note: Necron: I exist for one purpose ... To return everything back to the zero world, where there is no life and no crystal to give life.) the Tree collapses; the party flees, while Zidane stays behind to rescue Kuja. (Note: Zidane: ... Kuja's still alive. I can't just leave him.) One year later, the game reveals the cast's fate: Tantalus arrives in Alexandria to put on a show; Vivi has implicitly died as Black Mages only live for a year, but he has left behind several identical "sons," as well as grown to understand the meaning of life; Freya and Fratley are rebuilding Burmecia; Cid has adopted Eiko; Quina works in the castle's kitchen; Amarant and Lani are travelling together; and Garnet presides as queen of Alexandria, with Steiner and Beatrix as her guards. In the climax of Tantalus's performance, the lead actor reveals himself as Zidane in disguise and reunites with Queen Garnet. (Note: Robed performer: I beseech thee, wondrous moonlight, grant me my only wish! [removes robe, revealing himself as - ] Zidane: Bring my beloved Dagger to me!)

== Development ==
Early planning for Final Fantasy IX began in July 1998 before Square had finished development on Final Fantasy VIII. The game was developed in Hawaii as a compromise to developers living in the United States. As the series' last game on the PlayStation, Sakaguchi envisioned a "reflection" on the older games of the series. Leading up to its release, Sakaguchi called Final Fantasy IX his favorite Final Fantasy game as "it's closest to [his] ideal view of what Final Fantasy should be". This shift was also a response to demands from fans and other developers. Additionally, the team wanted to create a coherent story with deep character development; this led to the creation of Active Time Events which showcase the character's individual exploration away from the protagonist. Sakaguchi wrote the scenario for the game, with further contributions from Kazuhiko Aoki and Nobuaki Komoto.

Vivi, Zidane, Garnet, and Steiner in a full-motion video sequence

In the game's conceptual stage, the developers made it clear that the title would not necessarily be Final Fantasy IX, as its break from the realism of VII and VIII may have alienated audiences. This idea led fans to speculate that it would be a "gaiden" (side story) to the main series. By late 1999, however, Square had confirmed that the game would indeed be titled Final Fantasy IX, and by early 2000, they had almost finished the game. The developers made several adjustments to the game, such as changing the ending seven times. Director Hiroyuki Ito had designed the battle system.

The game's developers sought to make the game's environment more "fantasy-oriented" than its PlayStation predecessors by reintroducing a medieval setting. In the game world, steam technology is just beginning to become widely available. The population relies on hydropower or wind power for energy sources but sometimes harness Mist or steam to drive more advanced engines. Norse and Northern European mythology also inspired the game's setting. According to Ito, "[the development team is] attracted to European history and mythology because of its depth and its drama". The game's art director was Hideo Minaba, while the characters were designed by Shūkō Murase and Toshiyuki Itahana. Recurring artist Yoshitaka Amano created promotional concept art of the characters and world, and designed the logo. The main Final Fantasy IX website says the development of the game's world serves as a culmination of the series by blending the "successful elements of the past, such as a return to the fantasy roots", with newer elements. To accomplish this and satisfy fans who had become used to the realistic designs of Final Fantasy VIII, the designers stressed creating characters with whom the player could easily relate. The characters had "comic-like looks" as a result. In addition, The Dark Crystal was used as inspiration for the design of the world and characters. Ito suggested that the protagonist Zidane should be flirtatious towards women.

=== Music ===
Regular series composer Nobuo Uematsu wrote the music of Final Fantasy IX. In early discussions about the game, Ito asked him to compose themes for the eight main characters along with "an exciting battle track, a gloomy, danger-evoking piece, and around ten other tracks". Uematsu spent a year composing and producing "around 160" pieces, with 140 appearing in the game. During writing sessions, Square gave him a travel break in Europe for inspiration, where he spent time admiring ancient architecture in places like Germany. Uematsu cited medieval music as a significant influence on the score of IX. He aimed for a "simple" and "warm" atmosphere and incorporated uncommon instruments like the kazoo and dulcimer. Unlike the stark realism of its predecessors, the high fantasy undertones of IX allowed for a broader spectrum of musical styles and moods. Uematsu composed with a piano and used two contrasting methods: "I create music that fits the events in the game, but sometimes, the [developers] will adjust a game event to fit the music I've already written".

Uematsu incorporated several motifs from older Final Fantasy games into the score, such as the original battle music intro, a reworked Volcano Theme from Final Fantasy and the Pandemonium theme in Final Fantasy II. Tantalus' band plays "Rufus' Welcoming Ceremony" from Final Fantasy VII near the beginning of the game. Uematsu has stated on several occasions that Final Fantasy IX is his favorite score. "Melodies of Life" is the theme song of IX and shares its main melody with pieces frequently used in the game itself, such as the overworld theme and a lullaby that Garnet sings. Emiko Shiratori performed this piece in both the Japanese and English versions with arrangement by Shirō Hamaguchi.

== Release ==
Final Fantasy IX's release was delayed to avoid a simultaneous release with then-rival Enix's Dragon Quest VII. On October 7, 2000, a demo day for the North American version of IX was held at the Metreon in San Francisco, California. The first American release of the game was also at the Metreon; limited-edition merchandise was included with the game and fans cosplayed as Final Fantasy characters in celebration of the release. In Canada, a production error left copies of Final Fantasy IX without an English version of the instruction manual, prompting Square to ship copies of the English manual to Canadian stores several days later. Square heavily promoted the game both before and after its release. Starting on March 6, 2000, the game's characters appeared in a line of computer-generated Coca-Cola commercials. Figurines of several characters were also used as prizes in Coca-Cola's marketing campaign. That same year, IGN awarded Final Fantasy dolls and figurines for prizes in several of their contests.

Final Fantasy IX was also the benchmark of Square's interactive PlayOnline service. PlayOnline was initially developed to interface with Final Fantasy X but became a strategy site for IX when those plans fell through. Square designed the website to complement BradyGames' and Piggyback Interactive's official strategy guides for the game, where players who bought the print guide had access to "keywords" that they could search for on PlayOnline's site for extra tips and information. This design caused anger among buyers of the guide who felt cheated by the expensive print version's omissions. The blunder made GameSpy's "Top 5 Dumbest Moments in Gaming" list, and Square dropped the idea for Final Fantasy X, which was under development at the time.

Square Enix re-released the game as part of the Final Fantasy 25th Anniversary Ultimate Box Japanese package in December 2012. A remastered version featuring minor enhancements was released for Android and iOS on February 10, 2016. The remaster features HD movies and character models, an auto-save feature, seven different game boosters (cheats), including high speed and no encounter modes, and achievements. A port for Windows was released on April 14 the same year. On September 19, 2017, the Windows port was released on PlayStation 4. It was also released on the Nintendo Switch, Xbox One, and Windows 10 in North America on February 13, 2019, and in other regions a day later. The Windows port was later released to GOG.com on January 29, 2026.

== Reception ==
Reception

Aggregate scores
Aggregator	Score
GameRankings	PS: 93%
Metacritic	PS: 94/100 iOS: 88/100; PC: 84/100; PS4: 85/100; NS: 76/100
OpenCritic	81% recommend (Note: Based on 32 reviews)

Review scores
Publication	Score
Computer and Video Games	5/5
Famitsu	10/10, 10/10, 9/10, 9/10
Game Informer	9.75/10
GamePro	5/5
GameSpot	8.5/10
Hyper	95%
IGN	9.2/10
Next Generation	5/5
TouchArcade	iOS: 5/5

Awards
Publication	Award
4th Annual Interactive Achievement Awards	Console RPG of the Year; Outstanding Achievement in Art Direction; Outstanding Achievement in Animation
6th Annual Golden Satellite Awards	Best Interactive Product/Video Game

Final Fantasy IX sold over 2.65 million copies in Japan by the end of 2000, making it the second-highest selling game of the year in the region. Although it was a top-seller in Japan and America, Final Fantasy IX did not sell as many copies as VII or VIII in either Japan or the United States. In 2001, the game received a "Gold" certification from the Verband der Unterhaltungssoftware Deutschland (VUD), for sales of at least 100,000 units across Germany, Austria, and Switzerland. The original PlayStation version sold over 5.5 million copies by March 2016. Across all releases, the game was announced to have sold 8.9 million copies by March 2025.

Final Fantasy IX received universal acclaim both in Japan and abroad. It achieved a 94/100 on the review aggregator Metacritic making it their highest-scoring Final Fantasy game. The game was voted the 24th-best game of all time by readers of the Japanese magazine Famitsu in 2006. Francesca Reyes of Next Generation called it "an imaginative return to the roots of the Final Fantasy series that hits the RPG mark dead-on".

Critics generally praised the title's gameplay and combat system. GameSpot approved of the simple learning curve and that the ability system is not as complex as in VII or VIII. Each character possesses unique abilities, which prevents one character from overpowering the others. GameSpot describes the battle system as having a tactical nature and notes that the expanded party allows for more interaction between players and between enemies. Nevertheless, IGN disliked the lengthy combat pace and the repeated battles, describing it as "aggravating". RPGFan felt the Trance system was ineffective because the meter buildup is slow and unpredictable, with characters Trancing just before the enemy dies.

The characters and graphics also received positive reviews. Although IGN felt that the characters were similar to those in other Final Fantasy games, the characters were still engaging and sympathetic. GameSpot found the characters amusing and full of humor. IGN also noted that even the Active Time Event system helps expand the player's understanding of the characters' personalities as they grapple with many ideas and emotions. RPGFan enjoyed the detailed animation and design of the semi-deformed graphical style. They also praised the pre-rendered backgrounds, noting the careful attention given to the artwork, movement in animations, and character interactivity. They commended the cutscenes for being emotionally compelling and highlighted the seamless transition between cutscenes and in-game graphics. The music also received praise, with Electronic Gaming Monthly listing it the best soundtrack on their list of top five original soundtracks, while GamePro praised the audio for evoking "emotions throughout the story, from battles to heartbreak to comedy".

Critics acknowledged that Square primarily built the storyline upon elements found in previous Final Fantasy installments, such as evil empires and enigmatic villains. The main villain, although considered by GameSpot to be the least threatening in the series, was seen by IGN as an impeccable combination of "Kefka's cackling villainy" and "plenty of the bishonenosity that made Sephiroth such a hit with the ladies". RPGFan felt that the music was "uninspired and dull" compared to previous Final Fantasy titles and criticized composer Uematsu for reusing some tracks from past iterations of the series. Still, reviewers have concluded that this and many other elements are part of the overall effort to create a nostalgic game for fans of the older Final Fantasy games.

The strategy guide also received criticism; it urged buyers to log onto an online site to gain the information instead of providing it within the actual guide. The book's given links are no longer accessible on the PlayOnline website. The minigame "Tetra Master" was seen by GameSpot as inferior and confusing compared to Final Fantasy VIII's minigame "Triple Triad" as the rules are vaguely explained and offered few rewards despite its expansive nature.

During the 4th Annual Interactive Achievement Awards, the Academy of Interactive Arts & Sciences honored Final Fantasy IX with the "Console Role-Playing", "Art Direction" and "Animation" awards, as well as received nominations for "Game of the Year", "Console Game of the Year", "Original Musical Composition", and "Character or Story Development".

=== Legacy ===
Final Fantasy IX was voted the 4th best Final Fantasy game in a poll by Japan's national broadcasting organization NHK. IGN named it the 14th best game on the original PlayStation, calling it an "incredible" way to close out the Final Fantasy series's first nine games and complimented its reverence for those titles. Rock Paper Shotgun named the title their 4th best Final Fantasy game available on PC, praising the cast and its eclectic group of heroes. Though overshadowed during its initial release by other Final Fantasy titles, the game has been recognized for its mature themes, including mortality and handling death and is considered a JRPG masterpiece. The music has also been called one of Uematsu's greatest scores. The game has inspired a number of mods such as Moguri Mod, which is an unofficial remaster project developed by fans which saw its initial release in 2018.

In 2015, OverClocked ReMix released a four-disc collection called "Worlds Apart" with 120 songs to celebrate the 15th anniversary of the game's release. In June 2021, Cyber Group Studios and Square Enix announced plans to develop an animated television series based on Final Fantasy IX. however Cyber Group Studios' bankruptcy in 2025.

In December of that year, the series was titled "Final Fantasy IX: The Black Mages' Legacy" with Euro Visual being the new studio making it, and is expected to release in 2028. The series is said to be targeted to children aged 6-13, and will run for a single cour with each episode being 22 minutes each.

== Notes ==
Story notes
