= Final Fantasy Record Keeper =

2014 video game

- Poster art for Final Fantasy Record Keeper
- Developer: DeNA
- Publisher: DeNA
- Producer: Ichiro Hazama
- Designer: Tetsuya Nomura
- Artist: Naomi Sanada
- Series: Final Fantasy
- Platforms: iOS, Android
- Release: JP: September 24, 2014; WW: March 26, 2015
- Genre: Role-playing
- Modes: Single-player, multiplayer

Final Fantasy Record Keeper (Note: Japanese: ファイナルファンタジーレコードキーパー, Hepburn: Fainaru Fantajī Rekōdo Kīpā) is a free-to-play role-playing gacha game developed and published by DeNA for iOS and Android. The game features original characters and stories interacting with characters, scenarios, and battles from other games in the Final Fantasy series. It was released in Japan on September 24, 2014, and worldwide on March 26, 2015. The gameplay primarily consists of Active Time Battles with 2D sprite graphics. It has reached over 10 million downloads worldwide and was available in Japanese, English, French and Spanish. In 2020 all languages other than English were permanently removed. The game's service for the global version ended on September 29, 2022, leaving only the Japanese service up.

== Gameplay ==
Players enter each Final Fantasy titles world and fight to clear dungeons. After finishing it, they unlock new characters from those games. Players are able to combine parties of characters from different Final Fantasy titles. However, though using a game mechanic called "Synergy System", playing the characters that are initially from the world gives the characters a "stat bonus", which is also applied to weapons and gear. The game has players to reenact many climatic moments from the Final Fantasy series, such as the Battle on the Big Bridge against Gilgamesh. Characters are given weapons or abilities that are collected along the way.

In 2018, a new kind of dungeon, Record Dungeons was launched, featuring full pixel-art remakes of classic Final Fantasy scenes and dungeons, and an all-new adventure and records to explore alongside heroes of past games in the series.

== Plot ==
Tyro is a researcher who works in the history department for Dr. Mog. Being his best student, Dr. Mog shares his magic so that Tyro can enter paintings and see memories of different worlds, which are previous Final Fantasy titles. Tyro is also occasionally joined by original characters such as Elarra and Shadowsmith as they relive and restore the records of the great tales.

== Development ==
Developer DeNA proposed doing a social role-playing game to Square Enix that would center around the Final Fantasy series, similar to a title the developer had worked on previously called Defender of Texel. That game used pixel graphics and characters battling in formation. Square Enix producer Ichiro Hazama decided that DeNA had the experience to build a successful mobile game for western markets and gave the game approval to be developed. Square Enix oversaw the game and the story, setting, and characters, but DeNA completed the backend publishing. DeNa producer Yu Sasaki stated that international release was expected to happen upon initial launch of the game but was delayed and released after modifications were made to please western audiences.

For the international release of the game, artwork from any remakes that had been done of earlier Final Fantasy games were used, as developers felt that American audiences were connected more to later Final Fantasy games than earlier ones. Cutscenes were looked at again and polished for the same reason. The game was designed not to be difficult, and character profiles were also added for international release so new players could easily start enjoying the game. Tetsuya Nomura designed player character Tyro and supporting cast members Dr. Mog, Cid, and Elarra. To draw in American audiences, the first world entered in the game is from Final Fantasy VII, and the next two are fan favorites in Japan: Final Fantasy IV and VI. When the game runs events, characters are chosen based on player popularity. Characters are not added from games if there are not enough worlds or events from those same games. The game's producers felt that characters should be winnable through battle, and the game's currency of mithril given generously to encourage players to keep playing. Enemy bosses are animated, in a departure from the style of the older titles that are being referenced. Activities such as logging in to the game earn players in-game currency, and more opportunities to obtain free game currency were added for the international release. Western and Japanese versions of the game are on different servers, so no player communication is possible between the two versions. Producer Ichiro Hazama stated that the core of the experience of the game is "reliving the past". Hazama also felt there was room for original story expansion in the game's plot and the new main character Tyro. A teaser site appeared in July 2014 with a timer counting time for the game's actual reveal.

The game was shut down for the global versions on September 29, 2022, but Japanese service has continued.

== Reception ==
Reception

Aggregate score
Aggregator	Score
Metacritic	75/100

Review scores
Publication	Score
IGN	6.2/10
TouchArcade	5/5

Final Fantasy Record Keeper received positive reviews overall. IGN praised the game's use of nostalgia for previous Final Fantasy games and fun combat and customization, but they criticized its lack of character interaction and shallow story, making it hard for the game to hold players' interest. Kotaku voiced a similar sentiment, calling the game a "fun time waster" but noting the presence of the "much loathed stamina scheme" used to entice players to pay for more play time. VentureBeat said that the crafting and combining of items and weapons was "actually fun" and felt like a real Final Fantasy game, but condemned the gameplay as being boring because it is primarily a "hands-off" experience.

Within ten days of release, the game was downloaded over one million times. After a month, the game recorded three million downloads and one billion yen. The game reached five million downloads in six months in Japan and was in the top five highest-grossing games in the Apple App Store.
