= Edgar and Sabin =

Final Fantasy VI characters

- Final Fantasy character
- Edgar and Sabin concept art by Yoshitaka Amano
- First game: Final Fantasy VI (1994)
- Designed by: Soraya Saga

Edgar Roni and Sabin Rene Figaro are two characters in the 1994 video game Final Fantasy VI. They are main characters who become allied with characters like Terra Branford and Celes Chere while they battle the Gestahlian Empire and Kefka Palazzo. Edgar is the king of Figaro Castle while Sabin, his younger twin brother, trains in the mountains, a deal they arrived at after Edgar rigged a coin flip in Sabin's favor so he would not have to be king. They are both later separated from the others after the end of the world, though they can be reacquired over the course of the second half of the game. They were created by Soraya Saga, who was responsible for their backstory and dialogue.

They have been generally well received, with the book The Legend of Final Fantasy VI: Creation - Universe - Decryption analyzing them as being two sides of the same coin to create a complete character. Sabin's use of Suplex on an enemy called the Phantom Train was also well-received, with players expressing disappointment with the execution of the scene in the Pixel Remaster version of Final Fantasy VI. This led to Square Enix to update it before the final release of the game.

== Concept and creation ==
Edgar and Sabin were created for Final Fantasy VI by graphic designer Soraya Saga (real name Kaori Tanaka), who was responsible for the development of Sabin and Edgar, including their backstory and dialogue. They are twin brothers, with one living in the mountains to train while the other serves as the king of Figaro Castle. Their middle names, Rene and Roni respectively, are used for the names of the brothers Roni and Reni Fatima from Xenogears, a game that Saga and her husband Tetsuya Takahashi worked on.

Edgar is infatuated with women; according to Saga, this infatuation is due to the loss of his mother. He was also influenced by an older woman he had a crush on, a cousin to his father, who insisted he become a good man, leading him to aspire to be chivalrous. Her death caused him to seek out women who had a similar "spiritedness and lively wit." Edgar was initially conceived as a "sleazeball," but Saga felt it was too cliched, so she removed that aspect.

Saga discussed how Sabin had a surrogate family in the form of characters Gau and Cyan Garamonde; Gau because they both lost a father, and Cyan because he lost his child. She also noted that Sabin sees himself in Gau, as both have a connection to nature. In the World of Ruin scene, Sabin was originally able to die, which would trigger a scene where Edgar trying to save him. This was changed after it was decided that this part of the game was dark enough without it.

== Appearances ==
Edgar and Sabin first appear in Final Fantasy VI. Before the events of the game, their father, the king of Figaro Castle, dies, and one of them has to assume the throne. Neither wants to, with Sabin wanting to live on his own and seek vengeance after discovering that their father was poisoned by the Gestahlian Empire. They agree to decide who can go free based on a coin flip, which Sabin wins. It is later revealed that the coin was a two-headed coin, used by Edgar to guarantee Sabin's freedom. During the war between the Gestahlian Empire and the Returners, Edgar played both sides in order to maintain peace in Figaro Castle, though aware that Emperor Gestahl and one of its generals, Kefka Palazzo, were too volatile for peace between Figaro and the Empire to last.

Edgar aides protagonist Terra Branford and her ally Locke Cole escape the Gestahl Empire, all three of them allying with a group called the Returners. They eventually meet up with Sabin, who joins their cause. Sabin is separated after being lost in the rapids while fighting an octopus called Ultros attacks. Sabin allies with several characters during this time, including a ninja assassin named Shadow, a knight seeking revenge on the Empire named Cyan Garamonde, and a wild boy named Gau. Edgar, meanwhile, is working with Terra to infiltrate the town of Narshe and convince them to join the cause against the Empire. The group reunites here, and they successfully ward off an attack by Kefka. A general who betrayed the Empire, Celes Chere, joins them, and uses Edgar's coin to trick a gambler called Setzer Gabbiani into letting them use his airship.

Despite efforts to thwart the Empire, Kefka was able to destroy the world by disrupting the three goddesses of magic, making the world inhospitable and causing the allies to be scattered and killing Gestahl. At this point, Sabin becomes an optional character, and can be found when the new protagonist, Celes Chere, visits a town and finds him holding up a collapsing building to save the children inside. After Celes helps save them, Sabin joins her. Celes later finds a man calling himself Gerad, whom Celes and Sabin recognize as Edgar, who eventually rejoins them. Other characters who were encountered before may be encountered again, though they are all optional with the exception of Setzer, whose airship they once again need. The group eventually makes their way to Kefka, whom they successfully defeat.

The two appear in a doujinshi created by Soraya Saga titled Figaro no Kekkon, which explores their backstory, though his is not an official work.

== Reception ==
Edgar and Sabin received generally positive reception. In the book The Legend of Final Fantasy VI: Creation - Universe - Decryption, the author discusses both Edgar and Sabin. They discussed how Edgar was, in a way, his own coin, noting how he was a king who pursued women, an ally to both the Returners and the Empire, and defies conventions while remaining in control. They noted that this matched the themes of duality in the story, and how his brotherhood also did that. They argued that Edgar and Sabin formed a complete character, where Edgar was the brains and Sabin the brawn. They felt that Gerad, the persona Edgar adopted in the World of Ruin, represented a version of Sabin, where Edgar had to abandon his carefree attitude to assume the burden of responsibilities. They drew comparisons between the relationship between Edgar and Sabin to that of the brothers Edward and Alphonse Elric from Fullmetal Alchemist, commenting that despite being "as complementary to each other as they are different ... their approach to life remains similar." They also discussed how Sabin and Gau were the only ones who shaped their destiny through pure strength, whom they discussed as a brother figure to Sabin. They also focused on how Sabin chooses to let his actions speak for himself, citing how, when he fought Vargas, he chose to spare Vargas' life,

The coin clip was considered a significant moment to Game Informer writer Kimberley Wallace, particularly due to the message that people's accomplishments are possible through "invisible hands of those that we love." She discussed how it initially seemed like just a twist of fate, but the realization that the coin flip was rigged in Sabin's favor communicates that "those who love us will sacrifice so that we can keep our pride and independence." RPGamer writer Kelley Ryan discussed how Edgar was a standout king among kings in role-playing games, which she felt were a "dime-a-dozen" normally, describing him as being "full of charm [with] a unique hobby [while being] arguably the most powerful character in the game." She appreciated that, while flirting with Terra when they first meet, he treats her as a person, not interested in her magic abilities. She also appreciated his engineering prowess, demonstrated in both his castle being designed to submerge into the sand and his array of tools in combat.

A moment in the game where Sabin uses one of his moves, the Suplex, on the Phantom Train to suplex it into the ground, has become a famous scene, with writer Sebastian Deken finding it a particularly interesting use of his skills despite considering it likely that the developers did not intend for this scene. Game Informer writer Adam Biessenger expressed a desire for Edgar and Sabin to be the stars of Final Fantasy VI instead of Terra. He was particularly enamored with Edgar's willingness to sacrifice his own happiness for Sabin, as well as Sabin's ability to suplex a train. In the Pixel Remaster version of Final Fantasy VI, Sabin was still able to perform the technique on the Phantom Train, though because it did not turn upside down like the original, some fans were critical of this version. This caused Square Enix to respond, clarifying that this would be rectified by launch.
