= Gau (Final Fantasy) =

Fictional character in Final Fantasy VI

- Final Fantasy character
- Artwork of Gau by Yoshitaka Amano for Final Fantasy VI
- First game: Final Fantasy VI (1994)
- Created by: Yoshinori Kitase
- Designed by: Yoshitaka Amano; Kazuko Shibuya
- Voiced by: Tomo Muranaka

Gau (/ɡaʊ/; Japanese: ガウ) is a character introduced in the 1994 role-playing video game Final Fantasy VI by Square Enix. A feral child, Gau was raised by animals in the game's Veldt location after his father abandoned him as an infant, and later develops a familial bond with the characters Cyan and Sabin after they offer him food. Unlike other characters in the game, he fights specifically using enemy movesets the player can learn through using him against enemy encounters on the Veldt, though this renders him unable to be controlled for the duration of the fight. He has since appeared in other games related to the Final Fantasy franchise, including Dissidia Final Fantasy Opera Omnia, where he is voiced by Tomo Muranaka.

Gau received mixed reception upon release, particularly for being very difficult to use as a character in terms of gameplay, and the amount of time investment on the parts of players to get the most out of him. He has also been seen as too narratively disconnected from the game's main plot, however he has also received praise for his often comedic portrayal alongside his tragic backstory. He was also praised for his role in Cyan and Sabin's characterization, acting as a surrogate son to the former and brother to the latter, as well as the sense of family he brought to the group with his character's personal quest.

== Appearances ==
Gau is a feral child in the 1994 Square Enix video game Final Fantasy VI. Surviving by himself in the wilderness, he is first encountered in the game's Veldt location by the characters Cyan and Sabin, where after being fed some meat he will join up with the pair. After some comedic misadventures, he helps them return to the rest of the group. In the second half of the game, the group discovers that Gau's father is alive. They help dress him to be presentable to meet the man, only to discover he is insane. His wife died in childbirth, and driven insane he believed the crying baby to be a monster and abandoned it in the wild. Sabin threatens to strike the man in anger, but Gau stops him. The man compliments Gau's looks, saying he "must make his father proud", something that Gau takes to heart. Gau expresses he is happy just to see his father alive and well, and the group departs.

Unlike other characters in the game, Gau lacks a regular "Fight" command and cannot equip weapons. Instead he has two skills unique to him: Rage and Leap. The Rage skill allows him to select from a list of learned rages, enemy attack patterns Gau can mimic. While active, he will become uncontrollable for the rest of the fight or until his health is depleted. Meanwhile, he gains both the special traits of that enemy and will randomly attacks with moves available to the enemy. Gau can learn additional rages through the Leap command, which is only available when on the game's Veldt location. When using it during a random enemy encounter, Gau will jump towards the group of enemies and the battle will end, with Gau leaving the party temporarily. On the next random encounter, after combat Gau will return to the party and have learned any rages possible from the previous enemies and those from the current encounter.

In other games, he appears as a playable character in Final Fantasy Brave Exvius and Dissidia Final Fantasy Opera Omnia, where in the latter of which he is voiced by Tomo Muranaka. Outside of video games, cards representing Gau have been produced for the Final Fantasy Trading Card Game and Magic: The Gathering. A keychain figure based on his chibi artwork was also produced by Bandai, as part of a series to promote the release of Final Fantasy VI.

== Conception and design ==
Amano drafted several designs to define Gau's appearance and personality

Final Fantasy VI was developed with the mindset that none of the playable cast was the protagonist, and that each of them were equally the "main character". The cast of characters were selected from submissions from across the development team, with writer Yoshinori Kitase contributing the characters Celes, Kefka, and Gau, the last of which inspired by the story Flowers for Algernon and tales of children raised by wolves in the wild. Once the cast was selected, each individual would write their character's story, with Kitase balancing the plot as things developed while fleshing out his own characters.

Standing 163 centimetres (5 ft 4 in) tall, Yoshitaka Amano was commissioned to design the characters for the game from brief outlines provided. Given full creative freedom, Amano wanted to make "real" and "alive" characters, though with consideration for their representation in-game as small computer sprites. However, according to Sakaguchi and pixel artist Kazuko Shibuya, most of the characters were designed by Shibuya first as sprites. Though Shibuya acted as an intermediary between Amano and the development team, this resulted in discrepancies between Amano's concepts and the game itself. Gau appears as a young boy with spikey long green hair pulled into a ponytail, green shorts, a poncho, and red and yellow straps around his ankles and wrists. Amano drew several additional pieces of art for the character to both establish his design but moreso his personality.

When developing the character's story, Gau was meant to be separate from the overarching narrative, and meant instead to give a broader sense to the overall story. Over the course of the game they wanted to illustrate his use of language developing from a few simple sentences to offering the final words in important scenes. His personality was defined as speaking freely due to growing up on his own, however at the same time he has a sense of compassion and genuinely apologizes if he makes a slip of the tongue. Cyan was meant to serve as a surrogate father to Gau, each of them having lost their parents while Cyan had lost his family. His relationship with Gau was intended to be the closest, with the development team joking Cyan would routinely impart knowledge of the world upon Gau he learned only moments prior and he himself did not fully understand. Additionally, the reunion scene with Gau's father was originally meant to occur in the first half of the game, with Cyan being the one to grow angry with him instead of Sabin.

== Critical reception ==
Gau received mixed reception, particularly due to the difficulty of using him as a character during gameplay. Patrick Holleman in the book Reverse Design: Final Fantasy VI praised Gau's gameplay as "very innovative" but acknowledged the significant difficulty to properly make use of it due to the investment needed to make the most out of it and the Rage ability's random nature. Ritwik Mitra of The Gamer found the nature of Gau's abilities "annoying", and while he found the character's backstory interesting felt it was not worth the effort to make full use of him compared to much simpler characters in the game's roster. The staff of Edge however praised the means to recruit Gau coupled with his gameplay abilities, feeling they represented a "marriage of backstory with active application in the game world [that] fostered a clarity and precision" not often seen in video games at that time.

Other aspects of the character were more positively received. RPGamer's Cassandra Ramos called Gau an interesting take on the feral child concept due to how he survived by observing monsters and learning their attack patterns, and enjoyed how this was reflected in the character's gameplay. She further added that while Gau could be "uncouth" the character was also kind and innocent, and enjoyed that his basic grasp of language allowed him to interact and help his friends, and that his tragic backstory gave him a "remarkable childhood". Hollman meanwhile stated that while Gau is a peripheral character to the game's story, it did not mean "what little we see of him is handled badly". Instead he praised how Gau despite being raised in the wild showed genuine sympathy for Cyan's loss, and while the reunion scene with his father was heartbreaking, he found Gau's happiness for "even the slightest bit of off-hand praise" from him to be moving.

The staff of RPGFan stated that while they knew the character could be strong, his skills made him too difficult to use as a character. Lucas Greene in particular stated Gau was his least favorite character and left him unused when playing the game, feeling he did not fit the title narratively and did not "understand why he's there or what he adds to the game or the story at all." Other staff members agreed, but also stated they enjoyed his comedic moments and found they fit the game well, with Aleks Franiczek stating the character was worth bringing along alone for how funny he found him. The staff additionally appreciated the sequence leading up to Gau's reunion with his father, feeling it gave the group a sense of family and wishing the game had more moments like that.

=== Analysis of themes and music ===
Gau's theme was seen as illustrating his tragic past despite the sometimes comedic portrayal of his character, while also sharing similarities to the theme of the Veldt.

In the book The Legend of Final Fantasy VI, Pierre Maugein stated that while Gau is clearly a secondary character, he also acts as a "type of self-reflection of the game’s progress". Unlike many of the other characters who are contending with their own grief, Gau's primary goal is to stop Kefka, the game's antagonist that destroyed the world. Maugein further described him as a constrained sort of shōnen manga protagonist in this regard, someone rushing in to a "vengeful crusade without a deeper thought for its implications". He felt Gau's most important role in the party was as a surrogate son to Cyan and a brother of sorts to Sabin, giving the former an outlet for his fatherly love and making the duo "one of the most touching parts of the game" due to their powerful ties, and sharing the latter's desire for freedom. He added that despite Gau's "beastly state", he showed some of the most humanity and growth amongst the cast, going from barely being able to speak a language at the start to expressing care for his friends at the finale.

Sebastian Deken in his book examining Final Fantasy VI and its themes described him as "a bit of a mystery", comparing his characterization and means of joining with the party to how "a dog might be tempted to follow someone home" by someone feeding them. He felt while the character was a good source of comedic relief, such made it easy to overlook his sad backstory, and to Deken his theme music seemed to fill that role. He described it as "unembellished, a little sad, and unfailingly sweet", and added that once one got past his "kookiness, so was Gau". Though it only plays twice, it helps to set up his character, and drive home the point of it in Deken's view. Holleman in his own book also agreed, describing how the cello instrument's use in it gave both a melancholy sound as well as one invoking imagery of an animal. As the theme progresses, Holleman felt the tune after the full instrumental accompaniment felt like "a human choking down an anguished cry" while showing a brave face.

Deken further emphasized how the Veldt's own unique music felt like a secondary theme for Gau, sharing many themes with his main themes and even melodies with Gau's "formal" theme before diverging from it. As it progresses it becomes distinctly different than Gau's own, something that Deken read as "getting wilder with each passing section" in a way that "mirrors Gau’s exile from humanity" and gives a better look at his lost childhood. He felt that the themes when listened in the context of each other helped drive home the theme of his "wildness as a hide draped over his gentleness and innocence."
