= Umaro =

Umaro is a Guinea-Bissau given name.

- Umaro Sissoco Embaló (born 1972), 6th president of Guinea-Bissau
- Umaro Embaló (born 2001), Portuguese footballer
- Umaro, character in Final Fantasy VI
