= Cyan Garamonde =

Fictional character in Final Fantasy VI

- Final Fantasy character
- Artwork of Cyan by Yoshitaka Amano for Final Fantasy VI
- First game: Final Fantasy VI (1994)
- Created by: Hiroyuki Ito
- Designed by: Tetsuya Nomura (preliminary); Yoshitaka Amano; Kazuko Shibuya
- Voiced by: Ryūzaburō Ōtomo

Cyan Garamonde (/ˈkaɪæn ˈɡærəmɒnd/), known in Japan as Cayenne Garamonde (Japanese: カイエン・ガラモンド, Hepburn: Kaien Garamondo), is a character introduced in the 1994 role-playing video game Final Fantasy VI by Square Enix. A samurai, he serves the Kingdom of Doma. However an invading Empire poisons its water supply, and as a result its citizens are killed, including Cyan's wife and child. Driven by grief he seeks revenge against the Empire and joins the game's roster of playable characters. He has since appeared in other games related to the Final Fantasy franchise, including Dissidia Final Fantasy Opera Omnia, where he is voiced by Ryūzaburō Ōtomo.

Cyan was well received, particularly regarding his character arc and the portrayal of his grief within the games. He has been praised as one of the characters with the most depth in the title and the franchise as a whole. In addition he has been observed as being unique amongst the game's cast for his cultural background and how it may be perceived differently depending by Japanese and American audiences. His music theme within Final Fantasy VI has also been examined, not only in how it relates to his cultural imagery but also to the layers of his character.

== Appearances ==
Cyan Garamonde is a samurai in the 1994 Square Enix video game Final Fantasy VI. An old-fashioned and honorable man, he serves the king of the game's Doma region. During a conflict with a rival Empire, the game's antagonist Kefka poisons the water supply, killing not only most inside but also Cyan's wife and child. Driven into rage he attacks the Empire on his own, later teaming up with the character Sabin. As they proceed, they accidentally board the Phantom Train, a spectral vehicle meant to transport dead spirits to the afterlife. Though they escape, Cyan is horrified to see the spirits of his loved ones board it, and tries to say goodbye to them. The train proceeds forward, and his wife and child bid him farewell. Afterward they recruit the help of feral child Gau, and reunite with the rest of the playable cast.

After Kefka devastates the world, the party is separated and a time skip occurs. The ground finds Cyan, who has been writing letters to the wife of a deceased Imperial soldier and pretending to be him to ease her loss, and he decides to write one last letter admitting the truth to help her move on. If the party rests in Castle Doma after this point, the demon Wrexsoul attacks, trapping Cyan in his memories and unable to wake. After the party defeats him, Cyan makes peace with his grief and not only unlocks the full extent of his Bushido skill, but he also gains the sword Masamune.

In other games, he appears as a playable character in both Final Fantasy Brave Exvius and Final Fantasy Record Keeper. He is additionally a playable character in Dissidia Final Fantasy Opera Omnia, where he is voiced by Ryūzaburō Ōtomo. Outside of video games, cards representing Cyan have been produced for the Final Fantasy Trading Card Game and Magic: The Gathering. A keychain figure based on his chibi artwork was also produced by Bandai, as part of a series to promote the release of Final Fantasy VI.

== Conception and design ==
Nomura's early draft of Cyan differed heavily from the finalized design

Final Fantasy VI was developed with the mindset that none of the playable cast was the protagonist, and that each of them were equally the "main character". The cast of characters were selected from submissions from across the development team, with programmer Hiroyuki Ito contributing Cyan. Once the characters were selected, each individual would write their character's story, with Yoshinori Kitase balancing the plot as things developed. He was series creator Hironobu Sakaguchi's favorite character when developing the game, because Sakaguchi enjoyed the contrast between the masculinity of a samurai and the character's slender feel. Originally named Cayenne in Japanese, due to the limited length of character names for the playable cast it was shorted to Cyan in Western localizations.

Cyan was meant to serve as a surrogate father to Gau and Sabin, each of them having lost their parents while Cyan had lost his family. His relationship with Gau was intended to be the closest, with the development team joking Cyan would routinely impart knowledge of the world upon Gau he learned only moments prior and he himself didn't fully understand. Originally in development a character named Angela would have acted as a stereotypical "big sister" to him and jokingly flirt with Cyan. He would have brushed off these affections, but when alone would pause and "flatter himself if it was all true". These moments were intended to show a private side to his character, though were never meant to lead to romantic feelings as Cyan was devoted to his deceased wife.

Standing 178 centimetres (5 ft 10 in) tall, an early draft of the character's appearance was drawn by artist Tetsuya Nomura, while Yoshitaka Amano was commissioned to design the characters from the brief outlines provided. Given full creative freedom, Amano wanted to make "real" and "alive" characters, though with consideration for their representation in-game as small computer sprites. However, according to Sakaguchi and pixel artist Kazuko Shibuya, most of the characters were designed by Shibuya first as sprites. Though Shibuya acted as an intermediary between Amano and the development team, this resulted in discrepancies between Amano's concepts and the game itself. In his finalized design, Cyan appears as a tall older man with long balding hair pulled back into a ponytail, a thick mustache, and wearing dark blue and brown armor.

Cyan's personality was meant to feel "serious and inflexible", though early in development he was intended to have a "strange" personality, while his sword attacks had flashy names such as "Super Explosive Shouryuu Zan!" In the final games he's described as having an "old fashioned personality", with traits such as expecting modesty from women, though at the same time said personality was also made to be intentionally vague to represent the cultural gap between him and the other characters. In the Japanese version this is further represented by his manner of speaking, with him ending sentences with "gozaru", an archaic manner of saying "to be". In English localizations, this was changed to him speaking in Early Modern English, with him frequently saying "thou".

== Critical reception ==
Cyan was mostly well received upon his debut, particularly for his character's journey. Michael Sollosi of RPGFan described it as "tragic, adorable, and dramatic at various points in Final Fantasy VI", and felt that the culmination in the battle with Wrexsoul was a particular high point of the game overall. He noted that while the conclusion of the fight offered its own rewards, he felt that witnessing "Cyan’s self-actualization after all of his suffering" was the true reward, and provided a memory of the game he'd never forget. While journalist Jason Schreier in an article for Kotaku praised all the characters in Final Fantasy VI, he particularly noted the impact of Cyan's story, and felt his journey with Sabin "could be spun out into a buddy comedy film" of its own, drawing comparison to the Rush Hour films. Comic Book Resources' Vladimir Olivares meanwhile felt the character's growth from one motivated by revenge to finding some peace in helping others made him one of the best characters in the title, and saw his series of letters to the Imperial soldier's widow as bringing some closure to his own grudge with the Empire.

The Phantom Train scene in particular was significantly discussed. Destructoid writer Chad Concelmo praised how Cyan's grief was portrayed, and stated that the act of seeing his dead wife and child allowed the player to better relate to him as a character than if told through exposition alone. As a result, the player's emotions are tied to the character, and the appearance of his wife and child boarding the Phantom Train triggers the same response it does in them as it does for Cyan, adding "to the drama exponentially". This coupled with the minimalist sound design of the scene to add to the somber atmosphere led it to be one of Concelmo's favorite moments in gaming. Aoife Wilson of Vice on the other hand stated that while she felt the character "a bit of an idiot" and "one of those party members people tend to gloss over" in favor of others in part due to his manner of speech, she shared similar sentiments to Concelmo regarding the Phantom Train conclusion. Describing it as a "sobering, heart-wrenching moment", she added that it instilled a sense of empathy and respect in the player for a character they may have previously seen as "kind of a loser".

=== Analysis of themes and music ===
Cyan's musical theme uses sounds akin to Feudal Japanese instruments to illustrate his unique culture, but also repetition and tonal shifts to demonstrate layers to his character

In the book The Legend of Final Fantasy VI, Pierre Maugein stated that while Cyan was portrayed as more of a "Shakespearean swashbuckler" in the localized versions of VI, his personality as a "mature, strong-willed man" in both versions showed an "intransigence in keeping with his inspirations". His portrayal as a husband and a father in Maugein's eyes gave the character more gravity, and allowed him to be seen as a "potential leader, both humane and fierce, while still maintaining a sensitive side." He found this type of protagonist not only common throughout the Final Fantasy series, but also in distancing his character from that of the unattached hero archetype. Maugein added that Cyan was also different from other characters in the game, as while loss was a recurring theme in Cyan's case, he was frequently reliving it, pointing at the implication of the Phantom Train scene's conclusion in his willingness to sacrifice his life to be with his family, and how it illustrated the cyclical tragedy of death and abandonment. Furthermore, while Cyan's struggles with Wrexsoul and its minions showed him shedding his pain, loss and sadness, his helping of the widow could also be seen as him coping with his own loss, and in the final letter he sends her an acknowledgement that both of them must move on. He was ultimately glad Angela was cut as a character concept, as he felt it would have undermined what he came to see as one of the "most elaborate characters in both Final Fantasy VI and the entire series as a whole".

Sebastian Deken in his book examining Final Fantasy VI and its themes saw Cyan representative of the philosophical concept of "the other" when observed through an American gaze, though felt Japanese players may see him as more of a conservative character compared to their current societal standards. This was demonstrated both through views of the world and manner of speaking, but also the visual differences from the other characters, particularly his uniquely black hair and his more narrow eyes shown on his sprite when compared to the rest of the game's playable cast. Deken also felt that he was representative of the concept of extinction, as he's the sole person to carry his people's memory and culture forward after the genocidal attack upon his country.

Deken went further to say many of these traits were also represented in his musical theme, which featured instruments not typically found in Western orchestras. Amongst these are the shakuhachi, a flute associated with spiritual practices in Japan's feudal period, and taiko drums. In addition they utilized repetitive movements and strings, suggesting a more rigid way of thinking that echoed Cyan's more conservative approach. However, as the song proceeds these instruments and repetitive elements are removed, giving way to a theme that sounds similar to Tchaikovsky's Romeo and Juliet orchestral work, illustrating his sense of loss and helping to portray him as a deeper character than his earlier comedic moments would imply while helping to inform the listener what kind of person Cyan is. He added that unlike other character themes in the game, Cyan's illustrated a shift in personality in tone; where others illustrated a constant forward march, Cyan's theme "drops its sword and kneels".
