= Characters of Final Fantasy VI =

Square's role-playing video game Final Fantasy VI, which was released as Final Fantasy III in North America, features fourteen permanent player characters, the largest number of any game in the main Final Fantasy series, as well as several characters who are briefly controlled by the player.

== Concept and design ==
Pixel artist and graphic designer Kazuko Shibuya conceived the initial designs of some of the cast, including protagonist Terra Branford. Monster designer and graphic director Tetsuya Nomura created the original designs and many story episodes for Shadow and Setzer Gabbiani, he also did the illustrations of the cast based on the characters sprites as well as the chibi artworks in the manual. Field graphic designer Kaori Tanaka created the original designs of Edgar Roni Figaro and Sabin Rene Figaro. Yoshitaka Amano once again returned for the promotional artwork, he also conceived the final designs of Shadow and Setzer. A character named Angela was developed, but was ultimately cut from the game. She was to be like a "big sister" to Cyan and wield a whip, allowing the story to explore Cyan's vulnerability and private side.

Co-director Kitase wanted to create many characters that could stand up to be main characters and ensure the story did not revolve around one character, so each character could have something to bring to the table. According to Yoshinori Kitase, one of the game's two directors, one of the themes of production was "everyone is the main character". Kitase also believes that this approach with the game's characters is one of its lasting appeals. Despite having a large cast of playable characters, the game is well known for its subtle revealing of character relationships and backstories over the course of the story. Cut scenes of character interaction also feature simulated "camera movement", with a similar emotional effect found in movies. During the game's development, the whole team contributed to the stories of the game's characters, which were then adjusted for consistency with the story by Kitase. Instead of just being "ciphers for fighting, players would have more choice in what the characters would do, and how that would alter the narrative and invest the player more deeply in the story". To make the characters more distinct, their fighting styles and abilities were made different. Balancing so many characters was a challenge, and as a result Celes and Kefka became bigger characters than initially planned.

== Main playable characters ==
=== Terra Branford ===
Terra Branford, known as Tina Branford (ティナ・ブランフォード, Tina Buranfōdo) in Japanese media, is the first introduced character, a mentally-enslaved Imperial super-soldier gifted with devastating magic. Hironobu Sakaguchi, the creator of the Final Fantasy series, greatly influenced the character's creation. Originally, Terra was to disappear along with the other Espers at the end of the game, but the developers decided it would be a "waste" to have her discover her humanity only to be erased, so she instead lost her powers.

=== Locke Cole ===
Locke Cole (ロック・コール, Rokku Kōru; also romanized as Lock Cole) is a thief who prefers to identify as a "treasure hunter". Like Terra, Hironobu Sakaguchi was also a major contributor to the character's creation.

He bears a personal vendetta against the Empire for assaulting his hometown, which killed his amnesiac love interest Rachel. Her last word is Locke's name. Driven by the conviction that failing Rachel led to her death, Locke seeks to protect Terra and Celes as he fights with the Returners against the Empire; Locke seeks a means of resurrecting Rachel as a way to right his greatest wrong. This takes him to the depths of the Phoenix Cave to acquire the "rebirth" power of the esper Phoenix. In the end, Rachel urges him to move on to find someone new to protect, giving Celes her blessing to watch over him before departing for the afterlife. He is also featured in the rhythm game Theatrhythm Final Fantasy as a subcharacter representing Final Fantasy VI. Locke also appears in Dissidia Final Fantasy NT, where he is voiced by Yūki Ono in Japanese and Jonathan von Mering in English.

IGN praised Locke as being the connection between Terra and Celes, helping tie the plot together, and having a unique ability to steal from his enemies.

=== Celes Chere ===
Celes Chere (セリス・シェール, Serisu Shēru) is a former general of the Empire, who was genetically and artificially enhanced into a Magitek Knight following a magic infusion. Co-director Yoshinori Kitase revealed that he put much effort into creating Celes, and that she is his favorite character in the game.

=== Edgar and Sabin Figaro ===
Edgar Roni Figaro (エドガー・ロニ・フィガロ, Edogā Roni Figaro) is the young king of Figaro. Edgar was originally supposed to be a womanizer, but this was considered to be cliche and evolved into him having lost his mother as an infant. He later fell in love with an older woman who was killed in a "political rivalry", and she remained his version of an ideal woman.

Years before the game's events, neither he nor his twin brother, Sabin, bore desire for the crown. Edgar determined the succession with the flip of a double-sided coin to grant his brother's deeper wish for a free life, relegating himself to the burden of rule. Edgar later reveals the facts of this rigged gamble to Sabin. As Figaro's monarch, Edgar publicly maintains a strong alliance with the Gestahlian Empire, but secretly provides support and aid to the Returners, a rebel group seeking the liberation of conquered city-states. He fancies himself a ladies' man, earning a reputation as a die-hard womanizer. While attempting to arrange a meeting between Terra and the Returners' leadership, the Empire's court mage, Kefka, makes a surprise inspection of Figaro, seeking Terra. With Kefka's subsequent torching of Figaro, the alliance between the two nations is broken. Edgar helps Terra make contact with the Returners, reuniting with Sabin along the way, and later helps the party reach the western portion of the northern continent after the Narshe assault by means of Figaro Castle's submerging capability. During the World of Ruin, he appears disguised as a mercenary thief-for-hire named Gerad, an anagram of Edgar, to get back into the sunken wreck of his castle. Thereafter he returns to the player's control.

IGN described Edgar as flirtatious but heroic, providing comic relief but a strong leader in fighting for the rebels. Edgar also appears in World of Final Fantasy, where he is voiced by Shin-ichiro Miki in Japanese and Ray Chase in English.

Sabin Rene Figaro, whose name is Macias "Mash" Rene Figaro (マシアス『マッシュ』・レネ・フィガロ, Mashiasu "Masshu" Rene Figaro) in the Japanese version, is Edgar's younger twin brother. Soraya Saga, the co-creator of Xenogears, also helped shape Sabin's character.

Disgusted by the cold arbitration of his royal succession, Sabin leaves his heritage behind after winning a rigged coin toss to determine whether he or Edgar would not inherit Figaro's throne. He initially trains under the world-famous martial arts master Duncan Harcourt along with his son, Vargas. Over time, Vargas grows increasingly jealous of Sabin's martial prowess, seemingly slaying Duncan in a wrathful fit and fleeing to the mountains, with Sabin in pursuit. It is during these events that the Returners, accompanied by Sabin's brother Edgar, encounter him. After Vargas' defeat, Sabin is prompted to join the cause against the Empire, and after a period of separation where he meets Shadow, Cyan, and Gau following the Imperial siege of Doma, he participates in the defense of Narshe.

After the world's devastation, Sabin is the first ally Celes is led to encounter, found supporting the crumbling wreck of a mansion in Tzen after an attack by Kefka's 'Light of Judgment'. In this event, Celes has to rescue a child still inside the mansion and escape in six minutes. If time runs out, Sabin will lose his grip, causing a Game Over. However, according to an interview with the developers, originally, letting time run out in this event would cause Sabin's death, and returning to the town later with Edgar in the party and sleeping there would trigger a night-time cutscene where he digs among the rubble to find his twin brother's body, but they changed it because the World of Ruin was already dark. He later finds Duncan alive and well in the World of Ruin, somewhere east of Narshe, having survived Vargas' attack. From him, Sabin learns his final martial technique, the Phantom Rush.

=== Cyan Garamonde ===
Cyan Garamonde, whose name is Cayenne Garamonde (カイエン・ガラモンド, Kaien Garamondo) in the Japanese version, is a retainer to the king of Doma, a nation at war with the Empire. He feels immense shame and guilt for failing to protect the people of Doma, particularly the king and his wife and son, and later on for failing to stop Kefka from destroying the world.

=== Shadow ===
Shadow (シャドウ, Shadō) is an assassin and mercenary for hire, who is always accompanied by his faithful dog, Interceptor. During the first half of the game, Shadow operates on a freelance basis, at times available to the player for a fee and at times appearing in the employ of the Gestahlian Empire. In the Crescent Island and the Floating Continent areas of the World of Balance, Shadow is forced into the player's party. Shadow's fate is determined by player action on the latter area; if they have enough time to wait before leaping to the airship, Shadow will eventually accompany the party aboard the Blackjack and be available for permanent recruitment in the World of Ruin.

=== Gau ===
Gau (ガウ) is a thirteen-year-old feral child who lives among the animals on the Veldt. Yoshinori Kitase, one of the game's two directors, spent the most time developing Gau, stating that stories like Flowers for Algernon and tales about children raised by wolves were the inspiration for the character.

=== Setzer Gabbiani ===
Setzer Gabbiani (セッツァー・ギャッビアーニ, Settsā Gyabbiāni) is a gambler who owns the Blackjack, the only known airship in the world. The party first encounters him after being tricked into kidnapping Celes Chere instead of Maria, the opera diva whom he is enraptured with. Setzer also appears in Kingdom Hearts II as the reigning champion of the false Twilight Town's Struggle tournament, where he fights with Roxas. In Kingdom Hearts, he is voiced by Ryōtarō Okiayu in Japanese and Crispin Freeman in English.

=== Strago Magus ===
Strago Magus (ストラゴス・マゴス, Sutoragosu Magosu; Japanese name Stragos Magus) is an elderly gentleman living in the village of Thamasa. He is Relm's grandfather and, along with the other inhabitants of Thamasa, a descendant of the ancient Mage Warriors who fought in the War of the Magi.

=== Relm Arrowny ===
Relm Arrowny (リルム・アローニィ, Rirumu Arōnii) is a ten-year-old artist from the village of Thamasa and Strago's granddaughter. She is the youngest playable character in the game. When the group arrives in Thamasa, she meets them briefly, and they later save her from a burning house. She joins the party after tailing the player in the Esper Cave, despite complaints from Strago, and saves them during a scripted battle against Ultros.

== Optional playable characters ==
These characters are not part of the game's central plot, and are optional to encounter and recruit in any given playthrough.

=== Mog ===
Mog (モグ, Mogu) is a moogle who lives within the caves of Narshe with the rest of his species. He is distinguished from other moogles in his ability to speak human language, which was taught to him by the Esper, Ramuh, in his dreams. During the game's introductory sequences, he and other moogles help Terra and Locke escape from Narshe. Later in the story, Mog can be saved from a villainous thief, Lone Wolf, or abandoned to acquire an item. Either way, Mog is again encountered in the depths of the moogles' abandoned hollow in the World of Ruin. His class is "Geomancer", which has skills learned based on the terrain and attacks that incorporate it, such as landslides, sandstorms, avalanches, and forests.

=== Gogo ===
Gogo (ゴゴ) is the first of two hidden characters in the game, who is encountered should the party be engulfed by a creature on Triangle Island called the Zone Eater. In the game's development stage, Gogo would wander between different pubs in the World of Ruin, disguised as characters that had not yet been re-recruited. After players found them, they would return to the fake one and they would reveal themselves and be recruitable.

=== Umaro ===
Umaro (ウーマロ, Ūmaro) is a yeti. In the game's world of ruin, when the player goes to claim the Midgardsormr Magicite item, Umaro will attack the party. Once defeated, if Mog is present in the party he will be commanded by the moogle to join the protagonists as a playable character, due to adoring Mog as a boss. Umaro cannot be controlled during battle and can only equip relics. However, two of these relics, which only he can equip, grant him powerful special attacks. One of these attacks, granted by the Rage Orb, allows him to fling a party member at an enemy: this does not hurt the thrown party member and can even damage an enemy a fair amount. The second attack, granted by the Blizzard Orb, allows him to strike all enemies for ice-based damage.

During development, Umaro was originally meant to be much harder to recruit, roaming different areas of the game's world map and needing the player to use a food item to bait him to join, a concept later reused for Gau. Umaro was one of two characters created without any backstory in mind by the development team, the other being Gogo, intended to be "just there for you to select if you want them to be in battle." In an early mockup of the game's cast by Nomura, his appearance was drastically different, having prominent pointed ears and a large welp protruding from the top of his head.

== Other major characters ==
This section covers other characters who either play a major role in the plot, or are briefly controllable by the player, but without the full range of options that playable party members have.

=== Kefka Palazzo ===
Kefka Palazzo (ケフカ·パラッツォ, Kefuka Parattso; Cefca Palazzo in Japanese materials) is the main antagonist of the game. He is a sociopathic nihilist who served the Gestahlian Empire as Court Mage until he used the Warring Triad to devastate the world. IGN describes him as "dominating" the history of the Final Fantasy franchise for his maniacal representation of evil.

=== Ultros ===
Ultros (オルトロス, Orutorosu), whose name is Orthros in the Japanese version, is a carnivorous octopus who appears multiple times as both an antagonist and comic relief. IGN called him "unintentionally hilarious", noting his lack of any real motivation to follow the heroes and fight them. Ultros appears in Dissidia: Final Fantasy as a summon, again using the name Ultros. Ultros makes an appearance in Final Fantasy XIV along with his partner Typhon; this version of Ultros is a voidsent summoned by the Thaumaturge's Guild that works as a coliseum receptionist while also ogling women and rigging matches. Ultros appears as a boss in Final Fantasy IV: The After Years and Chocobo's Dungeon 2, as well as in Final Fantasy XII and Final Fantasy Tactics A2. Ultros also appears in Kingsglaive: Final Fantasy XV.

=== Typhon ===
Typhon (テュポーン, Tyupōn), whose name is Chupon in the original North American Super NES version, is a two-headed monster who appears as Ultros' "friend" while fighting the party as they are going to the Floating Continent, the final stage of the World of Balance. Typhon does not speak often, but according to Ultros, has a volatile temper. After the game shifts to the World of Ruin, they end up working as a receptionist and combatant in the Colosseum. Ultros, sometimes under the name Orthros, and Typhon have since appeared in other games. They appear as optional bosses in Final Fantasy I & II: Dawn of Souls under the names Orthros and Typhon. Typhon also makes an appearance in Final Fantasy XIV alongside his partner Ultros as a voidsent summoned by the Thaumaturge's Guild, working with him on his schemes and later finding employment in the Manderville Gold Saucer. Typhon appears in Final Fantasy VII as a summon. Ultros and Typhon appear in Final Fantasy XIII-2 as downloadable content.

=== Leo Cristophe ===
Leo Cristophe (レオ・クリストフ, Reo Kurisutofu) is one of the three top generals of the Empire, the others being Celes and Kefka. Unlike his compatriots, Leo refused to undergo Magitek infusion. He is fiercely loyal and possesses a strong sense of personal honor, and conducts himself with a measure of restraint otherwise absent in the Empire. He is later betrayed by the Empire, and killed by Kefka.

=== Banon ===
Banon (バナン, Banan) is the leader of the Returners, a group of rebels that opposes the Empire's harsh oppression. The party first meets him in the Returners' secret base, where he plans to have Terra try and speak with the frozen Esper in Narshe. He later accompanies them to the imperial capital of Vector when Gestahl proposes a truce, which turns out to be a ruse. He is last seen among the ruins of Vector after the Espers destroy it. His fate after Kefka's rise to power is unknown. Banon is temporarily controllable during a mission to transport him from the Returners' secret base to Narshe. His special command, 'Pray', is a powerful healing ability that targets the entire party and does not consume magic points.

=== Cid Marquez ===
Cid Del Norte Marquez (シド・デル・ノルテ・マルケズ, Shido Deru Norute Marukezu) is the chief magical researcher of the Empire. His pursuits lead to the creation of the Magitek labs and production facilities, along with the development of Magitek armor and soldiers. He is very close to Celes, and turns against the Empire upon witnessing her fight against Kefka. In the World of Ruin, he washes up on the same island as Celes and cares for her throughout the duration of her coma. The others who washed up along with them eventually fall to despair and commit suicide before she awakens. Celes is turned over to the player's control at this point, and Cid's ultimate fate is left to the player's ability to care for him in the sequence that follows. Should Cid die, Celes will discover a letter and the key to Cid's raft after attempting suicide herself. If Cid is nursed back to health, he will provide the raft for Celes of his own accord, wishing her farewell.

=== Emperor Gestahl ===
Emperor Gestahl (ガストラ, Gastra) is the ruler of the militaristic Empire. He discovered the gate to the Esper's world, and how to extract magical energy by those he captured. By reviving the use of magic, something considered taboo in the game's world, he was able to forge a large Empire that quickly conquered other countries. Not content with his power, he attempted to take control of the source of magic directly, the Warring Triad. However his subordinate Kefka betrays and kills him to take the power for himself.

=== Maduin and Madeline ===
Maduin (マディン, Madīn), an Esper, and Madeline (マドリーヌ, Madorīnu; Madonna in US SNES version), a human woman, are Terra's parents. They meet after Madeline accidentally stumbles into the Esper world, and Maduin nurses her back to health. Though other Espers do not trust her, Maduin defends her, and they soon conceive Terra. Eventually, Gestahl invades the area, captures Maduin, kills Madeline, and takes Terra with him. Maduin is drained of his magic for twenty years before he is finally reduced to Magicite. Maduin also appears as an Eidolon used by Eiko Carol in Final Fantasy IX and as a summon in Final Fantasy Tactics Advance, where she is known as "Madeen". He also appears as an Esper in Final Fantasy Tactics A2 and as a transfiguration of Titan in World of Final Fantasy.

=== The Warring Triad ===
The Warring Triad (三闘神, Santōshin), individually known as Fiend (鬼神, Kishin; Doom in US SNES version), Demon (魔神, Majin; Poltergeist in US SNES version), and Goddess (女神, Megami), are the beings responsible for the War of the Magi and the creation of Espers. After the period of near-apocalyptic destruction their conflict caused, the Triad willfully cease their battle and mutually seal away their abilities, reducing themselves to stone statues. It is the magical balance between them that maintains harmony throughout the world. However, Emperor Gestahl, obsessed with power, seeks the Triad to further his own desires. Gestahl is later betrayed and slain by Kefka, who gains control of the Triad and upsets their balance, virtually annihilating the planet's surface and reducing it to a wasted, chaotic shadow. After being drained of their power by Kefka in the time following his ascension, they are awakened as mindless husks that attack the party as they traverse the mangled spires of Kefka's tower.

The Warring Triad appear in Final Fantasy XIV: Heavensward in the form of statues on the floating continent Azys Lla, who are virtually identical to the original sprites in appearance. A series of side quests allows players to fight them to earn powerful weapons. In this appearance, they are depicted as elder primals awakened by the expansion's antagonist Thordan VII, who sought their power after becoming a primal himself. They are given names based on notes from original concept artwork that ended up unused in Final Fantasy VI. The Fiend is named Sephirot, the Goddess Sophia and the Demon Zurvan.

== Reception and legacy ==
In its review of the Game Boy Advance release, IGN says Final Fantasy VI's "cast of characters is huge and varied, and though several of them do draw from traditional RPG archetypes, this was the game that helped define those archetypes in the first place". In the GameSpy review of the Game Boy Advance version, it is said that "the large cast of characters, that is one of this game's hallmarks, is most impressive because of their individuality, both from a story and from a gameplay perspective, as well as the amount of effort that was put into exploring their personalities, motivations, and histories". Nintendo Power described the characters as some of the more memorable Final Fantasy protagonists ever, citing the ending's great character moments.

Several characters from the game have received standalone praise, such as Kefka who has been repeatedly named one of the franchise's greatest villains. In 2008, IGN placed him sixth on their list of the "Top 25 Final Fantasy Characters" with similar sentiments, but also included several other characters from Final Fantasy VI on the list. Ultros, who placed twenty-fourth, was praised for bringing "much needed" comic relief for the title, described as being augmented by Ted Woolsey's translation for the North American localization. Celes placed fourteenth, and was stated as providing one of the greatest memorable scenes and musical pieces in the game through the impromptu opera scene. Setzer placed twelfth, described as having "that most crucial of qualities in a hero, an unshakable sense of humor", as well as introducing the Gambler job class that would appear in later titles in the series. Nintendo Power listed Shadow as one of the best ninjas on Nintendo consoles. In an article on Dissidia Final Fantasy, IGN editor Ryan Clements called Terra one of the most recognizable and well-loved characters to join the army of Cosmos. In another poll the same year, eight of the characters – Locke, Edgar, Celes, Setzer, Terra, Shadow, Sabin, and Relm – were named among the fifteen most popular characters in the Final Fantasy series. In 2012, IGN made a list of their all-time favorite Final Fantasy characters, and included Celes, Edgar, Kefka, Locke, and Ultros.
