= Final Fantasy Artniks =

2012 video game

- Game logo
- Publisher: Square Enix
- Director: Kazunari Itakura
- Producer: Ichiro Hazama
- Series: Final Fantasy
- Platforms: Mobile phone, GREE
- Release: JP: November 30, 2012
- Genre: Social role-playing
- Mode: Multiplayer

Final Fantasy Artniks was a Japanese video game developed by Square Enix and the GREE social network. It is the second Final Fantasy social game and the second game developed with GREE.

The game is a card game using art assets, characters and battle systems from previous Final Fantasy titles. Players could either fight series of battles against enemies and bosses for rewards and rankings, or engage other players.

The game was released on November 30, 2012, and in just over a month, one million players had joined. Square Enix reported in 2013 that social games like Artniks were producing "acceptable profits".

A sequel to the game, titled Final Fantasy Artniks Dive, was released in June 2014. Both titles have since been discontinued.

== Gameplay ==
Players began the game by choosing a main card. They also utilized equipment cards that enhanced all characters in play. Ability cards were also used to make attacks stronger and hit points higher. Defeating enemies and completing quests filled a meter that when full made players to enter "Burst Mode", releasing treasure chests. Boss combat used Final Fantasy's active time battle system. Player versus player combat was also possible, and involved eleven cards instead of the five used in boss battles. Winners got points toward the game's leaderboard, and also "Mog Medals" that were used to access a mini-game.

=== Features ===
Characters, monsters and items from all the main Final Fantasy games appeared, as well as Final Fantasy Tactics, Final Fantasy Crystal Chronicles, Dissidia Final Fantasy, Final Fantasy Type-0, and others. Well known events from previous Final Fantasy titles were occasionally encountered. The game received updates periodically in the form of "Most Wanted" villains for players to share information about to find and defeat to earn rewards. The first update featured Kefka Palazzo from Final Fantasy VI and the second being Sephiroth from Final Fantasy VII.

== Development ==
The game was first revealed under the temporary title of "Final Fantasy X GREE" in October 2012. Theatrhythm Final Fantasy producer Ichiro Hazama collaborated with Kazunari Itakura to create the game. It was the second social game released under the Final Fantasy title and the second collaboration with the Japanese social network GREE. In an interview with Famitsu, Yuichi Itakura explained that the graphics were not remade to have a similar aesthetic like Dissidia or Theatrythm, but were kept similar to their original appearances to appeal to players sense of nostalgia and make the game feel more like a collectible card game. Those who registered early for the game's release received a free "summon ticket" reward and signing up for "The World Ends With You Live Remix" as well gave access to two extremely rare Aerith and Bahamut cards. The game was released in Japan on November 30, one month after its initial reveal.

== Reception ==
Famitsu featured Artniks on the cover of "Famitsu GREE" magazine on January 31, 2013, and carried rare character game card "Seifer Almasy". Square Enix revealed on January 11 that Artniks had reached over one million players in a little over a month, becoming their fourth game to reach one million. Later in February, Square Enix revealed that Artniks, like their other social gaming offerings, was producing "acceptable profits".
