= Kefka Palazzo =

Antagonist in Final Fantasy VI

- Final Fantasy character
- Artwork of Kefka by Yoshitaka Amano for Final Fantasy VI
- First game: Final Fantasy VI (1994)
- Created by: Yoshinori Kitase; Hiroyuki Ito
- Designed by: Yoshitaka Amano; Kazuko Shibuya (sprites)
- Voiced by: EN: Dave Wittenberg; JA: Shigeru Chiba

In-universe information
- Home: Gestahlian Empire

Kefka Palazzo (Japanese: ケフカ・パラッツォ, Hepburn: Kefuka Parattso; romanized as Cefca in the Japanese version) is a fictional character and the main antagonist of the 1994 role-playing video game Final Fantasy VI, developed by Square. Yoshitaka Amano created his visual design and director Yoshinori Kitase wrote his scenes. He is one of the most well-known and well-received villains in the Final Fantasy series. He was given a featured role in the fighting game Dissidia Final Fantasy and its sequels. He also appears as an enemy boss character in games including Theatrhythm Final Fantasy, Final Fantasy Artniks, Final Fantasy XIV, and Final Fantasy All the Bravest.

Kefka is first introduced as the court mage of Emperor Gestahl. Over the course of the game, he reveals himself to be a nihilistic psychopath, gone mad from the cruel experiments that gave him his magical powers. When Gestahl is poised to seize the source of magic in the world, Kefka betrays him and takes it for himself. With his new godlike powers, Kefka rules the remains of a ruined world with an iron fist.

Kefka is considered one of the most memorable video game villains ever created, with critics and fans noting his intense hatred and maniacal laughter as defining characteristics. He has also been compared to the Joker from the Batman franchise.

== Conception and creation ==
Kefka's appearance was designed by Yoshitaka Amano, who was given complete creative freedom in Final Fantasy VI, with only brief character outlines as guidelines. His approach was to create "real" and "alive" characters, though with consideration for their representation as small computer sprites. Several designs were created for Kefka during the planning stages, each with different outfits, taking inspiration from clowns seen at circuses. Amano felt the character was akin to DC Comics villain Joker, and wanted to illustrate a character that shared Joker's crazy personality, someone that was "completely insane". He found the overall process fun to develop.

Writer Yoshinori Kitase found the original writing "did not give him much character", and while working on the very first scene developed for the game, Kefka's approach to a castle, Kitase felt it was too boring to do normally. He added a scene off the top of his head where Kefka demanded soldiers dust off his boots in the middle of a desert, meaning for it to imply that there "may be a screw or two missing from this character's head", something he felt was a perfect fit for Kefka and helped define the character's personality for the rest of the story. In an interview with Edge, Kitase noted that while he wanted to keep story emphasis balanced across the cast, he found that Kefka was one of two characters whose importance in the story grew larger than originally intended when development began. Originally the game was meant to end much earlier with Kefka's defeat and the world saved, but when the developers realized they still had plenty of time, they added a second act where Kefka succeeds in devastating the world, leaving the party members scattered across the remains of the "World of Ruin".

Other developers involved with Final Fantasy VI's production also contributed to his characterization. Artist Kazuko Shibuya aimed to illustrate his "crazy and somewhat childish" demeanor through her work on his pixel art and animations, and considers him her favorite character in the franchise. While the rest of the cast had simple traits that were easy to draw, often easy to define as "cute" or "strong", she felt Kefka wouldn't stand out as much if he went through the same process. She utilized bases of red and green in his design to paint him as "very eccentric", while also wanting to illustrate his dangerous and childish aspects, a character with "no defined limits". Translator Ted Woolsey, who handled the North American localization of the game, also contributed lines to the character while working on the title, namely in part to get around Nintendo censors. Several of these have appeared in later interpretations of the character in other games, such as Kefka's statement about making "a monument to non-existence" in Final Fantasy XIV.

== Appearances ==
=== Final Fantasy VI ===
Kefka first appears as a general to Emperor Gestahl, serving as his court mage. Prior to the start of the game, he was the first human to be experimentally infused with the magic-like craft "Magitek", which granted him the ability to wield magic, although the imperfect process warped his mind and made him into the nihilistic psychopath he is during the course of the game. Through the first half of the game, Kefka leads the charge for the city-state of Vector to conquer the world, one kingdom at a time, using their magic weapons. Kefka mentally enslaves Terra and uses her to lead an attack on the town of Narshe to claim the frozen esper Tritoch there. When she escapes Imperial control, he pursues Terra to the kingdom of Figaro, setting the castle ablaze as she, Locke and King Edgar flee.

During a siege on the kingdom of Doma, Kefka grows impatient with fellow Imperial General Leo and poisons the drinking water in the castle of Doma, resulting in mass casualties and a swift victory for the Empire. After the alliance of Espers and revolutionaries invade and destroy Vector, Gestahl feigns sorrow for the Empire's evils, and to gain the trust of the protagonists, Gestahl has Kefka imprisoned, citing the poisoning of Doma. Kefka later goes to the village of Thamasa to kill the espers congregated there, killing Leo when he tries to intervene. Using the power of the espers, Kefka helps Gestahl raise the espers' homeworld to create the Floating Continent, where they intend to awaken three entities known as the Warring Triad. Upon being confronted by the protagonists, Gestahl freezes them except for former Imperial general Celes, whom he orders to kill her friends to show her loyalty to the Empire. However, she refuses and stabs Kefka instead, driving him into a psychotic rage. Kefka and the Emperor then get in a heated argument regarding the power of the triad—the Emperor only wants enough power to rule the world, while Kefka wants to unleash the Warring Triad's full potential. The Emperor tries and fails to kill Kefka, who retaliates by having the Warring Triad unleash their power to strike Gestahl down and unceremoniously boot him off the Floating Continent to his death. Kefka then moves the statues of the Warring Triad out of balance, unleashing enough raw magical energy to reshape the face of the planet, bringing about the second act of the game.

Imbued with the power of the statues, Kefka becomes the God of Magic in the ruined world he created, using the statues to forge a massive tower of random debris to serve as his headquarters. Kefka smites the millions who refuse to worship him with his "Light of Judgment", a beam of incinerating light capable of cutting fissures into the planet's surface, although he implies before fighting the Returners that he largely used the Light of Judgment on everyone for his own amusement regardless of whether they worshipped him or not. Confronted by the protagonists at the game's conclusion, Kefka reveals his nihilistic motivations: when the protagonists reject his claims, Kefka goes berserk and proclaims his desire to eradicate everything. Upon the defeat of his minions, Kefka reveals his godlike form and, after uttering one final nihilistic vision of life, dreams and hope, attacks the protagonists before he is ultimately slain, causing the power of magic to vanish.

=== Other games ===
Kefka is the villain representing Final Fantasy VI in Dissidia Final Fantasy, where the gods Cosmos and Chaos are fighting a cosmic war for control, with Kefka on the side of Chaos. As revealed in its prequel Dissidia 012, Kefka controlled Terra while she was a warrior of Chaos until Kuja weakens his spell, allowing Terra to escape and become a warrior of Cosmos with the aid of Vaan. During the events of Dissidia, Kefka allies himself with the Cloud of Darkness to bring Terra back to their side so he can use her Esper powers to fulfill his destructive desires. However, mastering her powers, Terra defeats Kefka to obtain her crystal. After Cosmos's death, Kefka breaks his ties to the other villains and starts his own scheme to become the ruler of the ruined world before being ultimately dispatched for good. Kefka returned in the third title, Dissidia NT.

For his appearance in Dissidia 012 Final Fantasy, Kefka received a considerable amount of work and changes according to producer Tetsuya Nomura and planning director Mitsunori Takahashi, while translator Tom Slattery, enjoyed writing new dialogue for Kefka. Additionally, director Takahashi Mitsunori said he felt that developing Kefka's attacks such as "reverse magic" felt similar to development of the recurring minor character Gilgamesh's attacks, and that the staff enjoyed brainstorming the moves. Kefka's Japanese voice actor, Shigeru Chiba, ad-libbed many lines, including shouting seafood words like "Pike!" and "Yellowtail!"

Kefka makes cameo appearances in Itadaki Street Portable, Theatrhythm Final Fantasy, and Final Fantasy: All the Bravest as an antagonist. He also appears as a huntable villain in a GREE social network card game called Final Fantasy Artniks, where players must share information to find and defeat Kefka to earn rewards. In Final Fantasy XIV, Kefka appears as a raid boss in the Stormblood expansion with an optional "Savage" difficulty setting featuring an exclusive phase against his God of Magic form, and later in the Dawntrail expansion for a higher-difficulty "Ultimate" raid that features a new "Reimagined" form designed by Nomura for the final phase of the encounter.

== Promotion and reception ==
Kefka as the God of Magic has been compared to depictions of Lucifer.

In 2006, Kefka was made into a toy in the Final Fantasy Master Creatures line. The figure is 15 centimetres (6 in) tall from the bottom of the base, representing his final form from the game's conclusion. A munny doll of Kefka in his human form was also created by Tomopop. An album of the music from Final Fantasy VI entitled "Kefka's Domain" was released on July 1, 1994. A figurine was created of Kefka for Square Enix's "Final Fantasy Creatures Kai Volume 5" in 2012.

Kefka is considered one of the most well received and enduringly popular villains in video games by critics and fans. He has earned a place on numerous "all time" lists from a wide variety of publications including Nintendo Power, UGO.com, IGN, GamePro, GameSpy, Den of Geek and many more. GamesRadar named him the most "outrageously camp" villain, stating that when compared to Kefka, Final Fantasy VII antagonist Sephiroth seems as "interesting as a dead accountant painted brown". They also compared him to the Joker from Batman, praising him for both his villainous ambition and his laugh. Digital Spy recognized him for being responsible for one of the most surprising moments in the Final Fantasy series—destroying the world.

Analyses of Kefka focused on his nihilism and unsympathetic portrayal. Konami video game developer Tomm Hulett described Kefka as a pure villain, stating that "unlike most Japanese stories, Kefka did not have shades of gray. He didn't have a tragic past that turned him into a sadistic clown that you felt sorry for him over. He didn't have some greater purpose that he lost sight of. Yet, at the same time, he wasn't 'evil for evil's sake'. There was something twisted and nasty inside him that MADE him that way... and you could feel it... but you also knew there wasn't any good in there". That he is a central villain of the entire game also serves to intensify a players negative fixation on him. In a review of Final Fantasy VI Advance, IGN wrote "it's the game's maniacal nihilist Kefka that really stands out. The most evil and destructive villain in the entire Final Fantasy franchise, Kefka's brutality and ruthlessness is unmatched and he has to be seen to be believed". IGN also noted his ability to "tap into primal, instinctive fears", including fears of clowns. CNet in their own review described him as "the unrivaled star of the show...he's the kind of villain that you will love to hate", comparing him to Jack Nicholson's portrayal of the Joker and calling his laugh one of the greatest sound effects in any video game. Kotaku has called Kefka the greatest video game villain of all time, and attempted to explain players' lasting fascination by noting that he inspires such hatred that when his evil plans are finally thwarted, the sense of joy from victory is so much the greater. GameSpy compared Kefka's final form as a representation of Lucifer, highlighted by his powerful "Fallen Angel" attack. (Note: The source mistakenly referred to the attack by the name "Fallen Angel". The correct name for the attack as it appeared in the SNES version of the game is "Fallen One". Subsequent re-releases and ports of the game have used the name "Heartless Angel" instead.) Another theory posited by GameSpot is that the intense reaction to Kefka stems from the fact that he is one of the few villains in Final Fantasy, or any game, that succeeds at his master plan before he is defeated.

Digitally Downloaded.net Editor in Chief Matt Sainsbury argued that while the character was "certainly psychopathic" and villainous, Kefka was not "insane". He added that while Kefka's behavior painted him as a dangerous character "we need to hate and want to stop because, in simply existing, he poses a threat to all decent people around him", his behavior felt completely rational to Sainsbury because Kefka operated off a different moral core than others, and considered this fascinating. Sainsbury cited philosopher Michel Foucault's studies on madness, in which it was argued that in civilization's need to find an "other" to oppose, something separate from "decent" society, insanity was a common go-to. However Sainsbury felt Kefka's behavior came from his "nihilistic understanding on the purpose of life": creations exist simply to be someday destroyed and forgotten, and that the meaning of existence is non-existence. While Kefka's logic runs contrary to most people, Sainsbury described it as still rational and considered thought within the subject of philosophical debate. Additionally he pointed out under philosopher Niccolò Machiavelli's view of the world, many of Kefka's actions were justified. While the character commits atrocities, he is still effective and his actions need to be considered within the scope of the war the Empire he serves is fighting, and within that frame of reference helped make Kefka a more fleshed out and nuanced villain.

Patrick Dugan of Escapist Magazine called Kefka "an androgynous, perverted, wicked little clown [..] Somewhere between Shakespeare's Falstaff and King's It". He further described him as one of the most memorable Final Fantasy villains for how present he was in the game and his personality, feeling he was a necessity in the game's story as a representative of "science run amok [...] an Anti-Christ with a surreal laugh", and that his defeat gave the game's closure far greater significance.

The audio design for Kefka has been praised, including his iconic laugh and his signature musical themes, Kefka and Dancing Mad, by Nobuo Uematsu. Music professor William Cheng called his laugh "quasi-musical" and commended the sound engineers for imbuing character and personality into a limited sound effect. Music researcher Jessica Kizzire tracked Kefka's character arc and ascent to godhood through his musical themes. The repetition of Kefka in key moments of the game add new layers of meaning to the track. Uematsu included musical allusions to Kefka in his themes for Sephiroth and Ultimecia, the villains of Final Fantasy VII and VIII, respectively.
