= Locke Cole =

Fictional character in Final Fantasy VI

- Final Fantasy character
- Artwork of Locke by Yoshitaka Amano for Final Fantasy VI
- First game: Final Fantasy VI (1994)
- Created by: Hironobu Sakaguchi
- Designed by: Tetsuya Nomura (preliminary); Yoshitaka Amano; Kazuko Shibuya
- Voiced by: EN: Jonathan von Mering; JA: Yūki Ono

Locke Cole (Japanese: ロック・コール, Hepburn: Rokku Kōru) is a character in the 1994 video game Final Fantasy VI. Locke is a treasure hunter who becomes involved with the Returners, a group fighting against the Gestahlian Empire. He is known for his ability to steal items from enemies and for his strong sense of loyalty toward the people he cares about. Locke's past, including his relationship with Rachel, helps explain many of his actions and motivations throughout the game. He also develops a close relationship with Celes Chere as the story progresses. Locke has appeared in other Final Fantasy games and related media since his introduction in Final Fantasy VI.

== Appearances ==
Locke Cole is a character in the 1994 Square Enix video game Final Fantasy VI, and a thief who prefers to identify as a "treasure hunter". He bears a personal vendetta against the Empire for assaulting his hometown, which killed his amnesiac love interest Rachel. Her last word is Locke's name. Driven by the conviction that failing Rachel led to her death, Locke seeks to protect Terra and Celes as he fights with the Returners against the Empire; Locke seeks a means of resurrecting Rachel as a way to right his greatest wrong. This takes him to the depths of the Phoenix Cave to acquire the "rebirth" power of the esper Phoenix. Although some of the treasure chests here are empty, though Locke will give the contents to the party once the dungeon is cleared. In the end, Rachel urges him to move on to find someone new to protect, giving Celes her blessing to watch over him before departing for the afterlife.

He is also featured in the rhythm game Theatrhythm Final Fantasy as a subcharacter representing Final Fantasy VI. Locke also appears in Dissidia Final Fantasy NT, where he is voiced by Yūki Ono in Japanese and Jonathan von Mering in English.

Locke was also one of three characters from the game featured in a tech demo for the August 1995 SIGGRAPH event showing a 3D example of Final Fantasy gameplay. Intended to promote the concept of a 3D Final Fantasy game, a video of the gameplay was included in demo discs of Final Fantasy VII at the 1996 Tokyo Game Show. Outside of video games, cards representing Locke have been produced for the Final Fantasy Trading Card Game and Magic: The Gathering. A keychain figure based on his chibi artwork was also produced by Bandai, as part of a series to promote the release of Final Fantasy VI.

== Concept and creation ==
Final Fantasy VI was developed with the mindset that none of the playable cast was the protagonist, and that each of them were equally the "main character". The cast of characters were selected from submissions from across the development team, with Final Fantasy series creator Hironobu Sakaguchi contributing Locke. Once the cast was selected, each individual would write their character's story, with Yoshinori Kitase balancing the plot as things developed. In the earliest iterations, Locke was meant to be a dark and mysterious character using a magic sealing sword, and to have a rivalry with Terra Branford, another character developed by Sakaguchi who in this iteration was male. As things progressed, his personality was changed to be "more open", and he was changed into an ordinary man with a "bit of a past", meant to help progress the game's story. Meanwhile, his sword ability was modified, and giving to the character Celes Chere as her "Runic" ability.

Standing 175 centimetres (5 ft 9 in) tall, an early draft of the character's appearance was drawn by Tetsuya Nomura, while Yoshitaka Amano was commissioned to design the characters from the brief outlines provided. Given full creative freedom, Amano wanted to make "real" and "alive" characters, though with consideration for their representation in-game as small computer sprites. However, according to Sakaguchi and pixel artist Kazuko Shibuya, most of the characters were designed by Shibuya first as sprites. Though Shibuya acted as an intermediary between Amano and the development team, this resulted in discrepancies between Amano's concepts and the game itself. His outfit consists of an open dark blue jacket with a white shirt underneat, dark blue pants, boots, and a sash around his waist. A bandana covers his brow, inspired by a style worn by rock and roll musicians at the time. Locke was originally intended to be a brunette, however in the finalized design his hair is a sandy blonde.

== Critical reception ==
Locke was well received upon his debut. Kotaku writer Jason Schreier discussed how Locke's character has more depth than as he initially appears, praising Final Fantasy VI for depicting his and other characters' personalities in a subtle way. He argued that Locke's motivations for helping Terra as well as other people was because he was unable to save Rachel, thus driving him to save others. This point was also discussed by Dengeki Online writer Kawachi, who covered how "painful" it was to see Celes question this approach to life. Locke's relationship with Celes was regarded as among gaming's best by Paste writer Jessica Howard. touching upon Locke's propensity to protect women and how they grow closer despite internal traumas from which they suffer. Author Scott Lynch meanwhile named the titular protagonist of his book The Lies of Locke Lamora after Locke, citing the heavy influence Final Fantasy had upon his work.

His relationship with Celes also received praise. USgamer writer Nadia Oxford cited it as one of her favorite relationships in video games and one she often found herself coming back to when recalling romances in Japanese roleplaying games. She appreciated that while both characters start with significant flaws, they lean on each other through the story to mend their painful pasts as the game progresses. She also enjoyed that instead of blatantly stating they were in love, the game approaches it with a slow buildup, and praised it as a "nice example of showing versus telling", something she felt the genre wasn't particularly good at. RPGFan's Daniel Hernandez meanwhile praised Locke's charisma, and felt their relationship was "love in a very human, authentic fashion" in how it illustrated them moving on past their traumas. He further described was an aspect many could empathize with and recognize, and enjoyed the moment where they make their feelings for each other clear in the game's opera scene.

=== Analysis of themes and music ===
In the book The Legend of Final Fantasy VI, Pierre Maugein described him as a "classic RPG bulwark", a character that's depicted as a hot-headed savior ready to do the right thing at any given moment, and a character archetype that he felt was often a favorite of teenage gamers seeking escapism. However, Maugein stated that unlike many such examples his grief and guilt over Rachel made him unique. Instead of being driven by revenge against the Empire solely, his primary goal is to help others, but also by seeking Rachel's forgiveness, drawing comparison to the Greek hero Orpheus. He further described it "tragic behavior that extricates him from his stereotype and provides him with an unexpected fragility", and as he completes his quest the lesson he learns is to move on. Maugein felt this was represented by his relationship with Celes, someone he cared for rather than wanting to protect, and found that this "powerful extremism" made him a "resolute yet poignant protagonist".

Sebastian Deken in his book examining Final Fantasy VI and its themes described him as a "pathologically heroic" character who compensates for failing Rachel by frequently throwing himself into danger and being immediately protective of any woman he meets. Deken felt a good part of his characterization was emphasized in his theme music which shared a similar excited tone to Locke's portrayal, with the third measure "being a little unhinged". He emphasized however that neither the theme nor the character give the impression of going too far off the rails, but instead are a "smidge manic", reflecting that his "brashness and thievery come from a fearless, well-intentioned heart" demonstrated in the heartbeat-like pattern in the music's strings. He felt that Locke's heart was the crux of his character: an aspect of him permanently broken, and his daring behavior being a way to avoid dealing with his grief and self-blame.

Deken pointed out that while Locke's secondary theme, "Forever Rachel", was mostly a reiteration of his main theme shifted down a musical key and slowed down, it was also different enough and able to add to his character and the melodrama of Rachel's death. He felt by comparison the theme's use when Celes discovers a bird with Locke's bandana at the start of the game's second half was meant to represent hope in regards to Locke. Its use in the scene brings him into it despite not physically present, and gave both Celes and the player hope he survived the conclusion of the game's first half. Its last use at Rachel's farewell meanwhile represented Locke's revival as a character, no longer carrying the guilt he was carrying as the music transitions into his main theme, and in Deken's view illustrated how he was able to heal past his own trauma.

Patrick Holleman in the book Reverse Design: Final Fantasy VI stated initially he was annoyed by the character's "constant (and often over-wrought) chatter" initially, though later on came to understand it was an intentional effect. Holleman stated that for all of Locke's "bravado and bluster", in contrast when he revives Rachel briefly he is speechless, only able to utter her name when she dies permanently. This coupled with the use of "Forever Rachel" and his own theme in the scene struck Holleman, who stated he was "still amazed how uncanny (and moving)" it was to hear the themes used back to back in that fashion.
