= Dissidia Final Fantasy NT =

2015 Video game

- North American cover art featuring Cloud Strife, Warrior of Light, and Lightning.
- Developer: Team Ninja
- Publisher: Square Enix
- Director: Takeo Kujiraoka
- Producers: Ichiro Hazama; Yosuke Hayashi
- Writers: Kazushige Nojima; Saori Itamuro
- Composers: Takeharu Ishimoto; Keiji Kawamori; Tsuyoshi Sekito
- Series: Final Fantasy
- Platforms: Arcade; PlayStation 4; Windows
- Release: Arcade: JP: November 26, 2015; PlayStation 4: JP: January 11, 2018; WW: January 30, 2018; Windows: WW: March 12, 2019
- Genres: Action role-playing, fighting
- Modes: Single-player, multiplayer

Dissidia Final Fantasy NT (Note: Japanese: ディシディア ファイナルファンタジー NT, Hepburn: Dishidia Fainaru Fantajī NT) is a fighting game with action role-playing elements developed by Koei Tecmo's Team Ninja and published by Square Enix for PlayStation 4 and Windows.

The game is a follow-up to Dissidia Final Fantasy and Dissidia 012, released for PlayStation Portable, and similarly allows players to battle one another using many characters from the Final Fantasy series.

The game is a console port of the 2015 Japanese arcade game Dissidia Final Fantasy, (Note: Japanese: ディシディア ファイナルファンタジー, Hepburn: Dishidia Fainaru Fantajī) and was released worldwide in January 2018. The Windows version released worldwide on March 12, 2019 is called Dissidia Final Fantasy NT Free Edition.

== Gameplay ==
Dissidia Final Fantasy NT's battle system was redesigned from the ground up, though some elements from the previous titles have been retained. Characters are divided into four combat classes: power-based Vanguards, agility-based Assassins, range-based Marksmen, and unique trait-based Specialists. Characters can perform Brave attacks, which increase the player's Bravery level based on the amount of damage done. If an opponent is attacked while their Bravery is at zero, a Bravery Break will be triggered, giving the player a substantial Bravery boost. Players can also perform HP attacks that will do direct damage to an opponent based on their current Bravery level. Using HP attacks will reset the player's Bravery back to zero, forcing them to perform more Brave attacks before they can directly attack their opponent again. The previous games' EX Mode has been tweaked, with players able to equip one HP attack and two EX Skills per character in battle.

Unlike past Dissidia titles, NT places a focus on three-on-three combat, with players actively controlling one character while the in-game AI controls the other two. Each character has its own HP meter, along with a Party HP meter, Stamina meter, and Summon meter for the whole team. When a character is defeated, a segment will be removed from their team's Party HP meter; when the meter is depleted, the team loses the battle. Energy from the Stamina meter is expended when the player performs a dash or dodge to limit overuse; the meter will quickly recharge if the player remains on the ground for a short time. Players can use their shield or dodge to defend themselves, though the shield will deteriorate over time. Players can also fill their Summon gauge by attacking foes or destroying Summoning Crystals. By filling their team's Summon gauge, players can perform summons to call one of seven creatures such as Ifrit or Bahamut to attack their enemies, as well as grant passive buffs to the player's team.

In addition to Standard Battles, NT features a second battle type in the form of Core Battles. These involve each team being given a large crystal to protect, which their opponent must attempt to destroy; the team whose crystal is destroyed first loses the battle. The game features several types of single-player arcade ladders, in which a player's team must defeat a series of increasingly-difficult AI opponents. These will sometimes conclude with a Bonus Battle, in which the player's team must defeat one of the game's seven Summons in a battle for additional points. The game also supports online multiplayer battles, with players able to form teams of three to battle opposing teams.

By participating in online and offline battles, players will earn experience points to increase their Player Level and individual character levels. As characters level up, they will receive rewards such as new HP attacks. Increasing the Player Level will grant additional rewards such as new EX Skills, Summons, and Memoria Tokens, the latter of which must be acquired to progress in the game's Story Mode.

== Plot ==
Set long after the events of the previous two Dissidia titles, but before the arcade version, the dimension of World B is revitalized for a conflict between Materia, (Note: マーテリア, Māteria) the goddess of protection, and Spiritus, (Note: スピリタス, Supiritasu) the god of destruction, who respectively summon the warriors of Cosmos and Chaos as their champions. Unlike their prior involvements, the summoned warriors retain their memories of both the previous war and their original worlds, which are used to expand World B, while the mystical energy created from their battles maintains it.

Suspicious of the gods' unfamiliarity with their world and each other, Materia's warriors immediately separate to investigate the reason behind the new conflict. They learn from the world's summons that both gods were created from Cosmos's desire to protect the world. They also discover a separate threat in the form of "planesgorgers"—manifestations of Shinryu, the draconic being responsible for creating the previous cycle of war between Cosmos and Chaos—which threaten to absorb the world's energy and eradicate the world. When the world becomes overwhelmed by planesgorgers, the two sides form a truce to vanquish Shinryu himself, leading to a deliberate clash that lures him out. The warriors destroy Shinryu and return to their respective worlds, leaving behind duplicates of themselves with their memories of World B so that they may continue fighting on the gods' behalf.

=== Characters ===
Dissidia Final Fantasy NT features 38 playable fighters. The arcade version featured fourteen characters at launch, including thirteen heroes from the previous Dissidia titles and a new hero from Final Fantasy XIV, with new characters continuously added to the roster via post-launch updates. The base roster of NT included every character available in the arcade version at the time of its release, totaling 28. Ten new characters were added to the arcade version first before releasing on PlayStation 4 as DLC after a short window of exclusivity. NT is the first Dissidia game to include characters from Final Fantasy spin-offs such as Tactics and Type 0.

New characters to the franchise are listed below in bold.

Game of origin	Available at arcade release	Available at home release	Available after home release
Final Fantasy	Warrior of Light	Garland	
Final Fantasy II	Firion	The Emperor	
Final Fantasy III	Onion Knight	Cloud of Darkness	
Final Fantasy IV	Cecil Harvey	Kain Highwind, Golbez	
Final Fantasy V	Bartz Klauser	Exdeath	
Final Fantasy VI	Terra Branford	Kefka Palazzo	**Locke Cole**
Final Fantasy VII	Cloud Strife	Sephiroth	Tifa Lockhart
Final Fantasy VIII	Squall Leonhart	Ultimecia	**Rinoa Heartilly**
Final Fantasy IX	Zidane Tribal	Kuja	
Final Fantasy X	Tidus	Jecht	Yuna
Final Fantasy XI	Shantotto		**Kam'lanaut**
Final Fantasy XII	Vaan		**Vayne Carudas Solidor**, Gabranth
Final Fantasy XIII	Lightning		**Snow Villiers**
Final Fantasy XIV	**Y'shtola Rhul**		**Zenos yae Galvus**
Final Fantasy XV		**Noctis Lucis Caelum**	**Ardyn Izunia**
Final Fantasy Tactics		**Ramza Beoulve**	
Final Fantasy Type-0		**Ace**	

== Development and release ==
Dissidia Final Fantasy NT was developed by Team Ninja. The game was originally announced as an arcade title during the Japan Amusement Expo (JAEPO) trade show in Chiba, Japan in February 2015. The game was developed with the core technology of the PlayStation 4. Square Enix wanted to release it for arcades first, while a console version would not be in development until at least a year after the launch of the arcade version. During development, Team Ninja considered using their 'soft engine' that allowed skin textures to appear softer, but decided not to due to not enough characters taking advantage of the benefits. The Arcade version launched in Japan on November 26 the same year.

Director Takeo Kujiraoka hinted at the possibility of adding Noctis Lucis Caelum to the cast once Final Fantasy XV was released; Noctis was eventually added to the game. Kujiraoka also mentioned the possibility of the game becoming an eSport and being released outside of Japan.

A console version was discussed as being in development but required features such as a story mode and further gameplay refinement before release. A PlayStation 4 port, Dissidia Final Fantasy NT, was eventually made. The NT in the title was confirmed to have multiple meanings such as "New Trial", "New Tournament", and "New Tale". The scenario for Dissidia NT was written Kazushige Nojima—who also acted as a supervisor for the game—based on a draft by Dissidia and Final Fantasy XV writer Saori Itamuro. The PlayStation 4 version was released on January 30, 2018. A free-to-play version was released for PlayStation 4 and Windows via Steam on March 12, 2019.

As of February 2020, updates for the game ceased and no additional characters were added, with no current plans for a sequel. The developers initially targeted a total roster of 50 characters, including all those from the previous Dissidia titles. Characters not returning from Dissidia 012 include Gilgamesh, Laguna, Prishe, and Feral Chaos. Dataminers previously revealed the aforementioned characters, excluding Feral Chaos, as well as Zack Fair and Vivi Ornitier may have been planned to be implemented at some point.

== Reception ==
Reception (PlayStation 4)

Aggregate score
Aggregator	Score
Metacritic	67/100

Review scores
Publication	Score
Destructoid	7/10
Edge	5/10
Electronic Gaming Monthly	7.0/10
Famitsu	35/40
Game Informer	6/10
GameRevolution	3/5
GamesMaster	79%
GameSpot	5/10
GamesTM	6/10
IGN	6.9/10

The original arcade version, called Dissidia Final Fantasy, sold over 3,000 arcade cabinets and generated strong revenue in Japan during the fiscal year 2015. The game was included at the Evo 2017 eSports event.

The PlayStation 4 version, Dissidia Final Fantasy NT, sold 105,667 copies within its first week on sale in Japan, making it the best-selling game of the week in the country. It sold 134,100 units in Japan by January 2018. The game was well received by Famitsu on their issue 1521, scoring 9/9/9/8 [35/40], but received mixed reviews outside of Japan. It received praise for its innovative three-on-three combat system and fan service, but received criticism for its user interface, online matchmaking and lack of content.

In the company's 2018 third-quarter results presentation, Square Enix revealed the game's sales were below expectations, adding that they hoped future promotions will be able to grow the game, along with new updates and additional content.

The game was nominated for "Costume Design" at the National Academy of Video Game Trade Reviewers Awards, but lost to Red Dead Redemption 2.

The game reached number 5 in the PlayStation Store download chart.
