= Terra Branford =

Protagonist in Final Fantasy VI

- Final Fantasy character
- Terra, as seen in Dissidia: Final Fantasy (concept art by Tetsuya Nomura)
- First game: Final Fantasy VI (1994)
- Created by: Hironobu Sakaguchi
- Designed by: Kazuko Shibuya; Yoshitaka Amano
- Voiced by: EN: Natalie Lander; JA: Yukari Fukui

Terra Branford, known as Tina Branford (Japanese: ティナ・ブランフォード, Hepburn: Tina Buranfōdo) in Japanese media, is a character in the Final Fantasy series and the main protagonist of Final Fantasy VI. Kazuko Shibuya designed her and made her in-game sprites while the promotional artwork was made by Yoshitaka Amano. She also appears in the spin-off fighting game series Dissidia Final Fantasy and the rhythm series Theatrhythm Final Fantasy. She has made small appearances in several other games in and outside the Final Fantasy series.

Terra is the 18-year-old daughter of a human mother and a father who is an Esper, a magical creature with the natural ability to use powerful magic. She was mentally enslaved by the evil Gestahlian Empire, who used her gifted powers to wage war on the empire's neighboring countries. Several rebels rescue her at the beginning of Final Fantasy VI, and she decides to aid their campaign and protect those whose lives were affected by the Empire.

Developers, who initially planned Branford to be a young man, designed her character to start as a passive person in the first half of the game to show her growth throughout the story. Terra's character has received widespread critical acclaim, with game journalists and fans alike praising her complexity and unique backstory. She has been on many lists of gamers' favorite Final Fantasy characters and is one of the most well-known video game characters to date.

== Conception and creation ==
Final Fantasy VI was developed with the mindset that none of the playable cast was the protagonist, and that each of them were equally the "main character". The cast of characters were selected from submissions from across the development team. Once the characters were selected, each individual would write their character's story, with Yoshinori Kitase balancing the plot as things developed. According to series creator Hironobu Sakaguchi, the character was initially conceived as a half-esper young man in his early 20s. He was to be a partner and rival of the dark, mysterious Locke Cole. Named "Tina Branford" in Japanese media, American playtesters "hated the name Tina, almost to a person!", according to the game's translator Ted Woolsey. For this reason, Woolsey renamed the character "Terra" in the North American English version of the game. While acknowledging that some might dislike the name change, he noted that the games he worked on "were meant for a broader audience than the one which buys and plays Japanese imports" and that "those who know Japanese should play the original versions."

Artist Yoshitaka Amano was commissioned to design the game's cast from the brief outlines provided. Given full creative freedom, Amano wanted to make "real" and "alive" characters, though with consideration for their representation in-game as small computer sprites. However, according Sakaguchi and pixel artist Kazuko Shibuya, most of the characters were designed by Shibuya first as sprites. Though Shibuya acted as an intermediary between Amano and the development team, this resulted in discrepancies between Amano's concepts and the game itself. Shibuya initially designed Terra with short, blond hair, though it was later lengthened. She later insisted it be changed to emerald green, worrying that blonde hair would make it harder to distinguish the characters due to how often it was used in Amano's art. Amano considered Terra his favorite character to design, and opted to keep the original blonde hair for all of his illustrations, and his version of the character design has been used to represent Terra in some instances, such as the CGI cutscenes added to Final Fantasy Anthology's release of VI. Despite the lack of a main protagonist in Final Fantasy VI, Shibuya felt that Terra was in her eyes such, due to the heavy amount of art Amano drew of her.

Due to Final Fantasy VI's ensemble cast approach, the second half of the game opens with another character, Celes Chere, instead of Terra, who opened the first. Another reason for this shift is that the team wanted Terra's story arc to progress in a new direction after the first half. The game story made Terra a very passive character in the first half of the game to show her personal growth and strength as the story progressed. At the end of the game, Terra was initially going to die when magic left the world, but the development team decided that this would be "excessive" as she had finally discovered her humanity and let her live without her magic powers. In the game Dissidia Final Fantasy, producer Tetsuya Nomura chose Terra as the representative hero for Final Fantasy VI. He reasoned that without her, there would be no female hero character in the game's roster. Nomura stated that "based on [his] feelings" from Final Fantasy VI's production, he "thought it had to be Terra" as she appeared on the game's cover art and advertisements. Gameplay-wise, Terra is Nomura's favorite character in Dissidia Final Fantasy.

== Appearances ==
=== Final Fantasy VI ===
Terra is the first introduced character, a mentally-enslaved Imperial super-soldier who possesses destructive magic. She is made to participate in an armored assault on the town of Narshe, exterminating most of the town's militia in pursuit of a recently unearthed magical creature which are known as Espers. Upon encountering the creature, her fellow soldiers are killed and her armor destroyed. She wakes up in the home of a man named Arvis, now free of her slave crown and suffering amnesia. Pursued into the depths of Narshe's mines by Imperial forces, the thief Locke Cole and a horde of moogles eventually rescue her. After events in Figaro kingdom and another Imperial invasion on Narshe to claim the Esper, she learns she is the daughter of an Esper father and human mother, explaining her magical abilities. Having been previously brain-washed and extensively trained, Terra realizes she was instrumental in the Empire's conquest of the other city-states on the southern continent. She discovers that her power had caused the deaths of fifty Imperial troops in moments. Terra became a vital part of the revolutionary movement known as the "Returners", whose strategy was to try and ally with the Espers, who live beyond the sealed gate, against the Empire. Terra succeeded in opening the barrier between worlds and unleashed the Espers' upon the Empire, leaving its capital in ruins.

In the game's post-apocalyptic second half, Terra is found no longer wishing to fight. For the orphans of the town of Mobliz, she has become a mother figure. She fails to stop an attack on the town by a legendary demon known as Humbaba, requiring the players' party's intervention to drive it away. Returning to the village later, the player finds her ready to stand up against Humbaba. She joins the player to defeat it and vows to make the world safe for children. At the game's conclusion, Terra expects to fade from existence with the remaining Espers as magic leaves the world. Her fathers' spirit, however, tells her that she will not die because she is half-human.

=== Other appearances ===
Terra is the heroine representing Final Fantasy VI in Dissidia: Final Fantasy, a crossover fighting game featuring different characters from the Final Fantasy series. She returns in Dissidia 012 as a member of the evil Chaos army, and also appears in the next game, Dissidia NT with an alternate appearance featuring her green hair from Final Fantasy VI. Her character appears in the mobile title Dissidia Opera Omnia.

Terra is a playable character in Theatrhythm Final Fantasy, Final Fantasy Explorers, Airborne Brigade, and World of Final Fantasy, where she is voiced by Yukari Fukui. She is also one of the randomly purchasable "Premium" characters in Final Fantasy: All the Bravest and a collectible character in Record Keeper and Brave Exvius. Final Fantasy Tactics S briefly allowed Terra and other Final Fantasy characters to join their parties. Players can outfit their characters in Terra's outfit in Gunslinger Stratos 2. Her character was included in the technical demo Final Fantasy VI: The Interactive CG Game. Merchandise items featuring the character such as gashapon figurines and full models have been produced.

== Reception ==
The character was very well received, especially among the Japanese fans of Final Fantasy. Though she does not form a couple with anyone in Final Fantasy VI, "Terra and Edgar" and "Terra and Locke" were popular fan wishes in polls of Japanese fans. That same year, she was ranked sixth in V Jump's poll for the most popular characters in the Final Fantasy series. A 2013 poll by Square Enix saw that Terra was the sixth most popular Final Fantasy female character in Japan. In an article about Dissidia Final Fantasy, IGN editor Ryan Clements called her one of the most recognizable and well-loved characters to fight against evil alongside other Final Fantasy protagonists.

In 1996, Next Generation chose the scene of Terra learning to love again by taking care of orphaned children as the most memorable moment in the Final Fantasy series: "It's safe to say that no other game series has tackled such big issues, or reached such a level of emotional complexity. It truly is beautiful". In 2013, Gus Turner of Complex called her "a physical embodiment of the clash of man and magic that has defined much of the [Final Fantasy] franchise", praising the multi-dimensional aspects of her character and personality, and noted that as the game progressed, "we can't help ourselves from attaching to her on an emotional level". That same year, Tom's Guide's Marshall Honorof described her as "exactly what a maturing Final Fantasy series needed: a three-dimensional protagonist who is not a natural-born leader, but rather acquires compassion, focus and a genuine desire to make the world a better place", further arguing that she set a high standard for female protagonists that came afterward.

Terra has also been the subject of academic study. The book Japanese Culture Through Videogames praised the representation of her identity crisis as a character through the "Morph" ability in her gameplay, but noted that while she represented many of the game's thematic elements it was harder to see her as the protagonist of the game, due to the presence of so many other characters. It further called her care for the children in Mobilz a turning point for her, in relation to her own experiences, and further used her as a baseline for comparison to characters with similar states in other franchises such as Tekken's Jin Kazama. In the book The Legend of Final Fantasy VI, Pierre Maugein described Terra as initially portraying the archetypal "frail, protected heroine who is led to her truth by men", citing a belief that Japanese ethos and culture played a big part in this aspect. He noted however that she was an analogue to Kefka's reaction to societal rejection: where he sought to destroy, she utilized love and reconciliation. He further emphasized the importance of her being the character to force Kefka to justify his actions, adding that while some would not see her as the true protagonist of the game, she is just as essential for setting events in motion and the embodiment of transition from one era to another.

Dr. Kathryn Hemmann in an article for Kill Screen described her as a variation of the 'magical girl' archetype of late-20th century Japanese pop culture through her "Morph" ability, and further argued that alongside Celes she represented the game exploring posthumanism themes. She further described them as the protagonists of the game, and in the context of so many works of science fiction focusing on male protagonists, "the game's narrative emphasis on Terra and Celes is striking". She lastly added that "Terra and Celes are not characters to be consumed, but identities to be embraced and managed", feeling they represented in many ways the discussions of bioethics prominent in the 1990's, and that "humanity, in all its forms, can bravely continue on into an optimistic future".
