= Celes Chere =

Fictional character in Final Fantasy VI

- Final Fantasy character
- Artwork for Celes in Final Fantasy Dimensions II
- First game: Final Fantasy VI (1994)
- Created by: Yoshinori Kitase
- Designed by: Kazuko Shibuya; Yoshitaka Amano
- Voiced by: English: Christina Rose; Hannah Grace (Note: Celes' English vocals in Final Fantasy VI Pixel Remaster.); Japanese: Houko Kuwashima

Celes Chere (Japanese: セリス・シェール, Hepburn: Serisu Shēru) is a character and protagonist in the video game Final Fantasy VI. She was created by Yoshinori Kitase and was his favorite character in the game. She struggles with allegiances between the Empire and the rebel group, the Returners before ultimately siding with the latter. She appears in other Final Fantasy titles, including the Theatrhythm series and World of Final Fantasy.

She has received generally positive reception, praised by critics for being a good female character. Her attempted suicide, struggles with allegiance, and opera scene are cited as among the most significant aspects of Final Fantasy VI.

== Concept and creation ==
Celes' character and story, including her attempted suicide and opera performance, were designed by game director Yoshinori Kitase. Kitase regarded her as his favorite character in Final Fantasy VI. Her appearance and in-game sprites were designed by graphic designer Kazuko Shibuya who also did additional illustrations to use as a basis for her sprites, in particular her appearance during the opera scene, which she felt looked "cute". Promotional artwork was handled by artist Yoshitaka Amano, who was given complete creative freedom in Final Fantasy VI, with only brief character outlines as guidelines. His approach was to create "real" and "alive" characters, though with consideration for their representation as small computer sprites. This alternate design is used in some spinoffs titles such as Dissidia Final Fantasy Opera Omnia.

Celes' role in the game was limited at first, but this changed later in development. She was a rune knight, able to use an ability called rune; prior to that, the ability had been attached to another character named Locke Cole. Celes was originally meant to feature the "conflicted spy" archetype, where she would spy on the protagonists. She was also supposed to be mentally unstable like Final Fantasy VI antagonist Kefka.

Celes was set as the first character players controlled in the World of Ruin portion of the game to avoid giving Terra Branford's story too much emphasis over others. In the original release of the game, she was depicted being tortured while restrained, but this was changed in the Game Boy Advance port of Final Fantasy VI due to the lack of Computer Entertainment Rating Organization age ratings when Final Fantasy VI was originally released. Scenes depicting violence against a restrained person would have raised the rating outside of the target rating Square Enix was looking for. This censorship would carry over to the later Pixel Remaster re-release.

== Appearances ==
Celes first appears in Final Fantasy VI as an Imperial general, and then as one of the game's protagonists. Celes joined the Returners after being jailed for questioning Kefka's plan to poison the kingdom of Doma. She becomes particularly close to Returners member Locke Cole. She performs at an opera house in order to catch the attention of the owner of an airship. In the second half of the game, Celes awakens from a coma on a deserted island, having been cared for by Cid, another person from the Empire. She discovers that the world has been sent into ruin by Kefka, that he has obtained godlike power to rule the world, and that his rule is causing all life to slowly wither away. She attempts to care for Cid, though if players do not do an adequate job feeding him, he dies. This causes Celes to fall into despair and attempt to kill herself by jumping off a cliff (although she will survive). Whether he lives or dies, ultimately Celes takes a raft that Cid had made and journeys to find if any of her compatriots had survived. Finding her friends causes her to have hope, and they use a new airship to confront Kefka and end his reign.

She later appears as a playable character in the Theatrhythm Final Fantasy series, Final Fantasy Tactics S, Final Fantasy Brave Exvius and Final Fantasy: Record Keeper. She appears as a supporting character in World of Final Fantasy, where she received her first voice roles from Houko Kuwashima and Christina Rose in Japanese and English respectively.

== Reception ==
Celes Chere has received generally positive reception following her appearance in Final Fantasy VI. She has been regarded as one of the best characters in Final Fantasy, with some of the strongest moments being her opera performance, her growth from being a soldier in the Empire, and her relationship with Cid. She is particularly popular as a female character, both in Final Fantasy and in video games as a whole, for similar reasons. Nintendojo writer Joshua Johnston praised her for her quest to reunite the cast in the second half of Final Fantasy VI as her standout moment. Meanwhile, writer Laura J. Peterson in a discussion with Edge praised how her emotions illustrated her character's internal conflict, and made her a "wonderful character who was integral to both the story and the gameplay."

Celes was recognized in particular for certain moments in Final Fantasy VI, including her aria and attempted suicide. Kotaku writer Richard Eisenbeis discussed how the aria combined with Celes' attempted suicide drove him to tears, while fellow Kotaku writer Peter Tiervas discussed how Celes' despair and hope during the second portion mirror the players' and how impactful her suicide attempt was years after witnessing it. Alana Hagues for RPGFan discussed how she saw herself in Celes due to going through similar trials and tribulations, particularly Celes losing her allies, the loss of a family member, and her attempted suicide. The relationship between her and Locke was praised as one of the most beautiful subtle romances in video games by Stew Shearer for The Escapist. She has been requested for inclusion in the Dissidia Final Fantasy fighting game series as a playable character by staff of websites including Hardcore Gamer, Electronic Gaming Monthly, and Digitally Downloaded, the latter calling her their favorite character in Final Fantasy VI. Her Amano-designed outfit was featured among the best Final Fantasy outfits by Maddy Myers for Paste Magazine, while Todd Harper for Paste Magazine preferred the Amano design over her in-game artwork. Chad Concelmo for Destructoid also praised her outfit, noting that the bright yellows in it work well with her fair skin.

Not all reactions to the character were positive. Writer James Labolokie from Nintendo felt that Celes relied too much on Cid and Locke to qualify as a character who breaks boundaries. Jef Rouner for the Houston Press was similarly critical of how she was depicted, noting that despite her and Terra's importance and strength, they were frequently "bound and dominated" by men and require their aide. Patrick Holleman observed that much of her personality is implied in what she does not say and that the opera scene, which he described as one of the game's "cleverest" due to its use of symbolism, gives players the only real insight into her character in the first half of the game. Holleman argued that she is not a brilliant or rounded character because she suffers from a lack of characterization, particularly in the first half of the game, and attributed the developers' decision to have players start with Celes in the World of Ruin to her lack of character and identity.

The book The Legend of Final Fantasy VI by Pierre Maugein offers an in-depth analysis of her character. In it, Celes is described as holding an important role in the story not only due to her direct connection to the Empire but also her role as a proud warrior and woman, further describing her as "a battle-hardened character with an unwavering idea of her place, yet she never loses sight of who she is, regardless of the circumstances." In addition, he stated that her past trauma made her fragile emotionally and that moments of weakness, aloofness, or desertion were always tied to someone close to her. While this made her seem unsociable in the first part of the game, he further noted her interactions with Locke as she realized she was not the only one who had to fight. Maugein states that while this may be seen as a stifling of her independence, it instead relates more to her love for Locke, despite her initial doubt that he may only see her as a way to right his inability to save a past loved one. This gives her a goal to fight for a world where she can be loved, and her mingling of "humanism with a rational perspective" gives her purpose as the foundation for the group and its setting, particularly in the World of Ruin.

Dr. Kathryn Hemmann, in an article for Kill Screen described her as representing "posthuman themes" and "optimism" alongside Terra. She discussed how Celes' "lithe and slender form, when juxtaposed against her sword and the geopolitical conflict," evokes the "beautiful fighting girl" archetype of late-20th century Japanese pop culture, whose "female-coded compassion is often portrayed as the solution to an otherwise unwinnable war." Celes' magic was read by Hemmann as a form of posthumanism and "otherness", an otherness that dissipates and becomes normalized when the rest of the cast develops the ability to do magic. She lastly added that "Terra and Celes are not characters to be consumed, but identities to be embraced and managed", feeling they represented in many ways the discussions of bioethics prominent in the 1990s and that "humanity, in all its forms, can bravely continue on into an optimistic future".
