= Final Fantasy VI =

1994 video game

- Japanese cover art by Yoshitaka Amano
- Developer: Square
- Publishers: Square: Super NES; WW: Square; PlayStation; JP: Square; NA: Square Electronic Arts; EU: Sony Computer Entertainment; Game Boy Advance; JP: Square Enix; WW: Nintendo; Android, iOS, Windows, Nintendo Switch, PlayStation 4, Xbox Series X/S; WW: Square Enix
- Directors: Yoshinori Kitase; Hiroyuki Ito
- Producer: Hironobu Sakaguchi
- Designer: Hiroyuki Ito
- Programmer: Ken Narita
- Artists: Tetsuya Takahashi; Kazuko Shibuya; Yoshitaka Amano; Hideo Minaba; Tetsuya Nomura
- Writers: Yoshinori Kitase; Hironobu Sakaguchi
- Composer: Nobuo Uematsu
- Series: Final Fantasy
- Platforms: Super Nintendo Entertainment System; PlayStation; Game Boy Advance; Android; iOS; Windows; Nintendo Switch; PlayStation 4; Xbox Series X/S
- Release: April 2, 1994: Super NES; JP: April 2, 1994; NA: October 11, 1994; PlayStation; JP: March 11, 1999; NA: October 5, 1999; PAL: March 1, 2002; Game Boy Advance; JP: November 30, 2006; NA: February 5, 2007; EU: July 6, 2007; Android; WW: January 15, 2014; iOS; WW: February 6, 2014; Windows; NA/EU: December 16, 2015; Pixel Remaster; Android, iOS, Windows; WW: February 23, 2022; Nintendo Switch, PlayStation 4; WW: April 19, 2023 Xbox Series X/S; WW: September 26, 2024
- Genre: Role-playing
- Mode: Single-player

Final Fantasy VI, (Note: Japanese: ファイナルファンタジーVI, Hepburn: Fainaru Fantajī Shikkusu) titled Final Fantasy III in its initial North American release, is a 1994 role-playing video game developed and published by Square for the Super Nintendo Entertainment System. It is the sixth main entry in the Final Fantasy series, the final to feature 2D sprite based graphics, and the first to be directed by someone other than series creator Hironobu Sakaguchi; the role was instead filled by Yoshinori Kitase and Hiroyuki Ito. Long-time collaborator Yoshitaka Amano returned as character designer and concept artist, while composer Nobuo Uematsu returned to compose the game's score, which has been released on several soundtrack albums.

Set in a world with technology resembling the Second Industrial Revolution, the game's story follows an expanding cast that includes fourteen permanent playable characters. The game's themes of a rebellion against an immoral military dictatorship, pursuit of a magical arms race, use of chemical weapons in warfare, depictions of violent and apocalyptic confrontations, several personal redemption arcs, teenage pregnancy, and the renewal of hope and life itself all make the storyline darker and more mature than earlier entries in the franchise.

It was ported by Tose with minor differences to the PlayStation in 1999, and the Game Boy Advance in 2006. The Super NES version was rereleased for the Wii's Virtual Console in 2011, and by Nintendo as part of the company's Super NES Classic Edition in 2017. The game was known as Final Fantasy III when it was first released in North America, as the actual Final Fantasy II, III, and V had not been released outside Japan at the time (leaving IV as the second title released outside Japan and VI as the third). However, all later versions of the game—other than re-releases of the original version—use the original title.

Final Fantasy VI received widespread critical acclaim and was praised for its graphics, soundtrack, story, characters, and setting. Many critics have ranked it as the best entry in the series, as well as one of the best video games of all time. Due to its impact, Final Fantasy VI is also often deemed a watershed title for the role-playing genre. The game was a commercial success, with the Super NES and PlayStation versions selling over 3.48 million copies worldwide by 2003, as well as over 750,000 copies as part of the Japanese Final Fantasy Collection and the North American Final Fantasy Anthology.

== Gameplay ==
Like previous installments, Final Fantasy VI consists of four basic modes of gameplay: an overworld map, town and dungeon field maps, a battle screen, and a menu screen. The overworld map is a scaled-down version of the game's world, which the player uses to direct characters to various locations. As with most games in the series, the three primary means of travel across the overworld are by foot, chocobo, and airship. With a few plot-driven exceptions, enemies are randomly encountered on field maps and on the overworld when traveling by foot. The menu screen is where the player makes such decisions as which characters will be in the traveling party, which equipment they wield, the magic they learn, and the configuration of the gameplay. It is also used to track experience points and levels.

The game's plot develops as the player progresses through towns and dungeons. Town citizens will offer helpful information, and some residents own item or equipment shops. Later in the game, visiting certain towns will activate side-quests. Dungeons appear as a variety of areas, including caves, forests, and buildings. These dungeons often have treasure chests containing rare items that are not available in most stores. Dungeons may feature puzzles and mazes, with some dungeons requiring the player to divide the characters into multiple parties which must work together to advance through the dungeon.

=== Combat ===
A battle in Final Fantasy VI

Combat in Final Fantasy VI is menu-based, in which the player selects an action from a list of such options as Fight, Magic, and Item. A maximum of four characters may be used in battles, which are based on the series' traditional Active Time Battle (ATB) system, first featured in Final Fantasy IV. Under this system, each character has an action bar that replenishes itself at a rate dependent on their speed statistic. When a character's action bar is filled, the player may assign an action. In addition to standard battle techniques, each character possesses a unique special ability. For example, Locke possesses the ability to steal items from enemies, while Celes' Runic ability allows her to absorb most magical attacks cast until her next turn.

Another element is the Desperation Attack, a powerful attack substitution that occasionally appears when a character's health is low. Similar features appear in later Final Fantasy titles under a variety of different names, including Limit Breaks, Trances, and Overdrives. Characters are rewarded for victorious battles with experience points and money, called gil (Gold Piece (GP) in the original North American localization). When characters attain a certain number of experience points, they gain a level, which increases their statistics. An additional player may play during battle scenarios, with control of individual characters assigned from the configuration menu.

=== Customization ===
Characters in Final Fantasy VI can be equipped with a variety of weapons, armor and, particular to this entry, powerful accessories known as "Relics". Weapons and armor increase combat capability, mostly by increasing statistics and adding beneficial effects to attacks. By comparison, Relics have a variety of uses and effects, are almost entirely interchangeable among party members, and are extended in sophistication to alter basic battle commands and exceed normal limitations of the game's systems.

Although in VI only two playable characters start the game with the ability to use magic, magic may later be taught to almost all other playable characters through the game's introduction of magicite and the Espers that magicite shards contain. "Espers" are the game's incarnation of the series' trope of "summons", powerful monstrous beings, many of which are recurring throughout the series, such as Ifrit, Shiva, Bahamut and Odin. Besides those returning from previous entries, VI features approximately two dozen of them in total, with more added to later versions of the game.

The setting and plot of the game revolve heavily around Espers and their remains when deceased, which are referred to as "magicite". Each piece of magicite has a specific set of magic spells that a character can learn when they are equipped with it in the menu. If used often enough, these abilities become permanently accessible, even if the magicite is removed. Additionally, some pieces of magicite grant a statistical bonus to a character when they gain a level. Finally, when a character equips a piece of magicite, they may summon the corresponding Esper during battle.

== Plot ==
=== Setting ===
Instead of the strictly medieval fantasy settings featured in previous Final Fantasy titles, Final Fantasy VI is set in a world with deliberately more industrial and mechanical design elements; developers described a setting where machinery and magic coexist. Opera and the fine arts serve as recurring motifs—most notably the opera sequence—documented in developer interviews and later remaster materials. During the first half of the game, the planet is referred to as the World of Balance, and is divided into three lush continents. The northern continent is punctuated by a series of mountain ranges, the southern continent has been mostly subjugated by the cruel Gestahl Empire, and the eastern continent is home to the Veldt, a massive wilderness inhabited by monsters from all over the world. An apocalyptic event mid-game transforms the planet into the World of Ruin; its withering landmasses are fractured into numerous islands surrounding a larger continent.

The game alludes to a conflict known as the "War of the Magi", which occurred one thousand years prior to the beginning of the game. In this conflict, three quarreling entities known as the "Warring Triad" used innocent humans as soldiers by transforming them into enslaved magical beings called Espers. The Triad realized their wrongdoings; they freed the espers and sealed their own powers inside three stone statues. As a precaution, the espers sealed off both the statues and themselves from the realm of humans. The concept of magic gradually faded to myth as mankind built a society extolling science and technology. At the game's opening, the Empire has taken advantage of the weakening barrier between the human and esper domains, capturing several espers in the process. Using these espers as a power source, the Empire has created "Magitek", a craft that combines magic with machinery (including mechanical infantry) and infuses humans with magical powers. The Empire is opposed by the Returners, a rebel organization seeking to free the subjugated lands.

=== Characters ===
Final Fantasy VI features fourteen permanent playable characters, the most of any game in the main series, as well as several secondary characters who are only briefly controlled by the player. The starting character, Terra Branford, is a reserved half-human, half-esper girl who spent most of her life as a slave to the Empire, thanks to a mind-controlling device, and is unfamiliar with love. Other primary characters include Locke Cole, a treasure hunter and rebel sympathizer with a powerful impulse to protect women; Celes Chere, a former general of the Empire, who joined the Returners after being jailed for questioning imperial practices; Edgar Roni Figaro, a consummate womanizer and the king of Figaro, who claims allegiance to the Empire while secretly supplying aid to the Returners; Sabin Rene Figaro, Edgar's independent brother, who fled the royal court to hone his martial arts skills; Cyan Garamonde, a loyal knight to the kingdom of Doma who lost his family and friends when Kefka poisoned the kingdom's water supply; Setzer Gabbiani, a habitual gambler, thrill seeker, and owner of the world's only known airship; Shadow, a ninja mercenary who offers his services to both the Empire and the Returners; Relm Arrowny, a young but tough artistic girl with magical powers; Strago Magus, Relm's elderly grandfather and a Blue Mage; Gau, a feral child surviving since infancy on the Veldt; Mog, a pike-toting Moogle from the mines of Narshe; Umaro, a savage but loyal yeti also from Narshe, talked into joining the Returners through Mog's persuasion; and Gogo, a mysterious, fully shrouded master of the art of mimicry.

Most of the main characters in the game hold a significant grudge against the Empire and, in particular, Kefka Palazzo, who is one of the game's main antagonists along with Emperor Gestahl. The clownish Kefka became the first experimental prototype of a line of magically empowered soldiers called Magitek Knights, rendering him insane; his actions throughout the game reflect his demented nature. The supporting character Ultros is a recurring villain and comic relief. A handful of characters have reappeared in later games. Final Fantasy SGI, a short tech demo produced for the Silicon Graphics Onyx workstation, featured polygon-based 3D renderings of Locke, Terra, and Shadow.

=== Story ===
In the town of Narshe, Terra participates in an Imperial mission to seize a powerful Esper encased in ice. Upon locating it, a magical reaction occurs between Terra and the Esper; as a result, the soldiers accompanying Terra are killed and Terra is knocked unconscious. Upon awakening, Terra is informed that the Empire had been using a device called a "slave crown" to control her actions. With the crown now removed, Terra cannot remember anything more than her name and her rare ability to use magic unaided. Terra is then introduced to an organization known as the "Returners", who she agrees to help in their revolution against the Empire. The Returners learn that Imperial soldiers, led by Kefka, are planning another attempt to seize the frozen Esper. After repelling Kefka's attack, Terra experiences another magical reaction with the frozen Esper; she transforms into a creature resembling an Esper and flies to another continent. Upon locating Terra, the party is confronted by an Esper named Ramuh, who informs the group that Terra may require the assistance of another Esper imprisoned in the Imperial capital city of Vector.

At Vector, the party attempts to rescue several Espers; however, the Espers are already dying from Magitek experiments and choose instead to offer their lives to the party by transforming into magicite. The group returns to Terra and observes a reaction between her and the magicite "Maduin". The reaction calms Terra and restores her memory; she reveals that she is the half-human, half-Esper child of Maduin and a human woman. With this revelation, the Returners ask Terra to convince the Espers to join their cause. To do this, she travels to the sealed gate between the human and Esper worlds. However, unbeknownst to the party, the Empire also uses Terra to gain access to the Esper world. There, Emperor Gestahl and Kefka retrieve the statues of the Warring Triad, raising a landmass called the Floating Continent. The group confronts Emperor Gestahl and Kefka at the Floating Continent, whereupon Kefka, whose mental state has completely deteriorated over the course of the story, usurps and murders Gestahl. Kefka then tampers with the alignment of the statues, which upsets the balance of magic and destroys most of the surface of the world.

One year later, Celes awakens on a deserted island. She learns that Kefka is using the Warring Triad to rule the world in a tyrannical god-like manner, destroying whole villages who oppose him and causing all life to slowly wither away. After Celes escapes the island, she searches for her lost comrades, who are found scattered throughout the ruined world. They come to terms with their situation and resolve to confront Kefka and end his reign, with Terra additionally accepting her half-Esper heritage and finding a new purpose in life in fighting for a better future. The group infiltrates Kefka's tower and destroys the Warring Triad before confronting Kefka himself, who has descended into nihilism as a result of his madness and plans to destroy all of existence as a means of self-validation. However, the group successfully destroys Kefka in battle, at which point magic and Espers disappear from the world; despite this, Terra is able to survive by hanging onto the human half of her existence. The group escapes from Kefka's tower as it collapses and flies away while watching as the world rejuvenates itself.

== Development ==
=== Creation ===
Final Fantasy VI entered development after the release of its predecessor V in December 1992. The development of the game took just one year to complete. The development team consisted of approximately 30 people, which was considered large for the time. Series creator and director Hironobu Sakaguchi could not be as intimately involved as in previous installments due to his other projects and his promotion to Executive Vice President of the company in 1991. For that reason, he became the producer and split director responsibilities for VI up between Yoshinori Kitase and Hiroyuki Ito: Kitase was in charge of event production and the scenario, while Ito handled all battle aspects. Sakaguchi supervised Kitase's cutscene direction and ensured that the project would coalesce as a whole. The idea behind the story of VI was that every character is the protagonist. All members of the development team contributed ideas for characters and their "episodes" for the overall plot in what Kitase described as a "hybrid process". Consequently, Terra and Locke were conceived by Sakaguchi; Celes and Gau by Kitase; Shadow and Setzer by graphic director Tetsuya Nomura; and Edgar and Sabin by field graphic designer Kaori Tanaka. Prior to Final Fantasy VI, sound effects in the series were not handled by dedicated staff; instead, they were often created by other team members after completing their primary tasks, reflecting a shift toward more specialized roles during development. Beyond character conception, Nomura was also responsible for designing the game's monsters and the visual aspects of battles. In the 30th Anniversary interview, Nomura revealed that his design process for the final boss, the Statue of the Gods, involved scanning hand-drawn sketches directly into the game to create sprites, a novel technique at the time that was never reused as the series moved to 3D graphics with Final Fantasy VII.

It was Kitase's task to unite the story premise provided by Sakaguchi with all the individual ideas for character episodes to create a cohesive narrative. The scenario of Final Fantasy VI was written by a group of four or five people, among them Kitase who provided key elements of the story, such as the opera scene and Celes' suicide attempt, as well as all of Kefka's appearances. The team decided to split the game into two halves, commonly termed the World of Balance and World of Ruin, because they were tired of the common game scenario of the hero narrowly saving the world. When writing the post-apocalypse second half of the story, the developers decided to let the player choose their favorite characters to emphasize that every character is the protagonist.

Regular series character designer Yoshitaka Amano's concept art became the basis for the models in the full motion videos produced for the game's PlayStation re-release. Tetsuya Takahashi, one of the graphic directors, drew the imperial Magitek Armors seen in the opening scene. By doing so, he disregarded Sakaguchi's intention to reuse the regular designs from elsewhere in the game. The sprite art for the characters' in-game appearance was drawn by Kazuko Shibuya. While in the earlier installments, the sprites were less detailed on the map than in battle, Final Fantasy VI's had an equally high resolution regardless of the screen. This enabled the use of animations depicting a variety of movements and facial expressions. Though it was not the first game to utilize the Super NES' Mode 7 graphics, Final Fantasy VI made more extensive use of them than its predecessors. For instance, unlike both IV and V, the world map is rendered in Mode 7, which lends a somewhat three-dimensional perspective to an otherwise two-dimensional game.

=== Localization ===
Graphics for the North American releases were edited to cover up minor instances of partial nudity. From left to right: Japanese SFC and GBA, North American SNES, and Western GBA releases.

The original North American localization and release of Final Fantasy VI by Square for the Super NES featured several changes from the original Japanese version. The most obvious of these is the change of the game's title from Final Fantasy VI to Final Fantasy III; because only two games of the series had been localized in North America at the time, VI was distributed as Final Fantasy III to maintain naming continuity. Unlike Final Fantasy IV (which was first released in North America as Final Fantasy II), there are no major changes to gameplay, though several changes of contents and editorial adjustments exist in the English script. In a January 1995 interview with Super Play magazine, translator Ted Woolsey explained that "there's a certain level of playfulness and ... sexuality in Japanese games that just doesn't exist here [in the USA], basically because of Nintendo of America's rules and guidelines". Consequently, objectionable graphics (e.g. nudity) were censored and building signs in towns were changed (such as Bar being changed to Café), as well as religious allusions (e.g. the spell Holy was renamed Pearl).

Also, some direct allusions to death, killing actions, and violent expressions, as well as offensive words have been replaced by softer expressions. For example, after Edgar, Locke and Terra flee on chocobos from Figaro Castle, Kefka orders two Magitek Armored soldiers to chase them by shouting "Go! KILL THEM!", in the Japanese version. It was translated as "Go! Get them!" Also, when Imperial Troopers burn Figaro Castle, and Edgar claims Terra is not hidden inside the castle, Kefka replies "then you can burn to death" in the Japanese version, which was replaced in the English version by "Then welcome to my barbecue!". Similarly, as Magitek soldiers watch Edgar and his guests escape on Chocobos, Kefka swears in Japanese, which was translated by Ted Woolsey as "Son of a submariner!". The localization also featured changes to several names, such as "Tina" being changed to "Terra". Finally, dialogue text files had to be shortened due to the limited data storage space available on the game cartridge's read-only memory. As a result, additional changes were rendered to dialogue in order to compress it into the available space.

The PlayStation re-release featured only minor changes to the English localization. The title of the game was reverted to Final Fantasy VI from Final Fantasy III, to unify the numbering scheme of the series in North America and Japan with the earlier release of Final Fantasy VII. A few item and character names were adjusted, as in the expansion of "Fenix Down" to "Phoenix Down". Unlike the PlayStation re-release of Final Fantasy IV included in the later Final Fantasy Chronicles compilation, the script was left essentially unchanged. The Game Boy Advance re-release featured a new translation by a different translator, Tom Slattery. This translation preserved most of the character names, location names, and terminology from the Woolsey translation, but changed item and spell names to match the conventions used in more recent titles in the series. The revised script preserved certain quirky lines from the original while changing or editing others, and it cleared up certain points of confusion in the original translation.

While the game was officially released in Japan on April 2, 1994, the exact street date for the initial North American release has been a subject of historical ambiguity, though it was widely available and topping sales charts by October of that year.

=== Music ===
The soundtrack for Final Fantasy VI was composed by long-time series contributor Nobuo Uematsu. The score consists of themes for each major character and location, as well as music for standard battles, fights with boss enemies and for special cutscenes. The extensive use of leitmotif is one of the defining points of the audio tracks. The "Aria di Mezzo Carattere" is one of the latter tracks, played during a cutscene involving an opera performance. This track features an unintelligible synthesized "voice" that harmonizes with the melody, as technical limitations for the SPC700 sound format chip prevented the use of an actual vocal track (although some developers eventually figured out how to overcome the limitation a few years later, and in the Pixel Remaster, it is voiced by opera singers in seven languages: Japanese, English, French, German, Italian, Spanish and Korean). The orchestral album Final Fantasy VI Grand Finale features an arranged version of the aria, using Italian lyrics performed by Svetla Krasteva with an orchestral accompaniment. This version is also found in the ending full motion video of the game's Sony PlayStation re-release, with the same lyrics but a different musical arrangement. In addition, the album Orchestral Game Concert 4 includes an extended version of the opera arranged and conducted by Kōsuke Onozaki and performed by the Tokyo Symphony Orchestra, featuring Wakako Aokimi, Tetsuya Ōno, and Hiroshi Kuroda on vocals. It was also performed at the "More Friends" concert at the Gibson Amphitheatre in 2005 using a new English translation of the lyrics, an album of which is now available. "Dancing Mad", accompanying the game's final battle with Kefka, is 17 minutes long and contains an organ cadenza, with variations on Kefka's theme. The "Ending Theme" combines every playable character theme into one composition lasting over 21 minutes.

The original score was released on three compact discs in Japan as Final Fantasy VI: Original Sound Version. A version of this album was later released in North America as Final Fantasy III: Kefka's Domain. This version of the album is the same as its Japanese counterpart, except for different packaging and small differences in the translation of some track names between the album and newer releases. Additionally, Final Fantasy VI: Grand Finale features eleven tracks from the game, arranged by Shirō Sagisu and Tsuneyoshi Saito and performed by the Ensemble Archi Della Scala and Orchestra Sinfonica di Milano (Milan Symphony Orchestra). Piano Collections: Final Fantasy VI, a second arranged album, features thirteen tracks from the game, performed for piano by Reiko Nomura. More recently, "Dancing Mad", the final boss theme from Final Fantasy VI, has been performed at Play! A Video Game Symphony in Stockholm, Sweden on June 2, 2007, by the group Machinae Supremacy.

In 2012, a Kickstarter campaign for OverClocked ReMix was funded at $153,633 for the creation of a multiple CD album of remixes of the music from VI. Andrew Aversa directed the creation of the album, Balance and Ruin, which contains 74 tracks from 74 artists, each with its own unique style. The album is free and available at the OverClocked ReMix website. Video Games Live composer Jillian Aversa, Andrew Aversa's wife, created a music video tribute to Aria di Mezzo Carattere, together with cellist Tina Guo, expanding on the arrangement from Balance and Ruin.

== Re-releases ==
=== PlayStation ===
Final Fantasy VI was ported to the PlayStation by Tose and re-released in Japan and North America in 1999. In Japan, it was available in both a standalone release and as part of Final Fantasy Collection, while in North America it was available only as part of Final Fantasy Anthology. In Europe it was sold only as a standalone release. Fifty thousand limited-edition copies were also released in Japan and included a Final Fantasy-themed alarm clock.

Final Fantasy VI's PlayStation port is very similar to the original Japanese Super Famicom release. With the exception of the addition of two full motion video opening and ending sequences and new screen-transition effects used for the start and end of battles, the graphics, music and sound are left unchanged from the original version. The only notable changes to gameplay (in addition to loading times not present in the cartridge versions) involve the correction of a few software bugs from the original and the addition of a new "memo save" feature, allowing players to quickly save their progress to the PlayStation's RAM. The re-release included other special features, such as a bestiary and an artwork gallery. The port was re-released in December 2012 as part of the Final Fantasy 25th Anniversary Ultimate Box package in Japan.

Final Fantasy VI was re-released as a PSone Classic in 2011: in Japan on April 20, in PAL territories on June 2 and in North America on December 6.

The "Pixel Remaster" series version of Final Fantasy VI was released for PlayStation 4 in April 2023. The remaster adds sprites re-drawn by Kazuko Shibuya, new arrangements of the game's music by Nobuo Uematsu, and some minor quality-of-life changes.

=== Nintendo consoles ===
After the PlayStation, Tose then ported the game to the Game Boy Advance, on which it was released as Final Fantasy VI Advance. It was released in Japan by Square Enix on November 30, 2006, with Nintendo handling publishing in North America on February 5, 2007, and in Europe on July 6. It was the last game to be released on the Game Boy Advance in Asia, as well as the last one to be published by Nintendo on the system. It includes additional gameplay features, slightly improved visuals, and a new translation that follows Japanese naming conventions for the spells and monsters. It does not, however, have the full-motion videos from the PlayStation version of the game. Four new espers appear in Advance: Leviathan, Gilgamesh, Cactuar, and Diabolos. Two new areas include the Dragons' Den dungeon, which includes the Kaiser Dragon, a monster coded, but not included, in the original, and a "Soul Shrine", a place where the player can fight monsters continuously. Three new spells also appear, and several bugs from the original are fixed. In addition, similarly to the other handheld Final Fantasy re-releases, a bestiary and a music player are included. Even in the Japanese version, the music player is in English and uses the American names, e.g. Strago over Stragus. The package features new artwork by series veteran and original character and image designer Yoshitaka Amano.

The original Super Famicom version was released for the Wii Virtual Console in Japan on March 15, 2011, in PAL territories (Europe and Australia) on March 18, and in North America on June 30. The game was released in the West with its original North American title of Final Fantasy III. The Super Famicom version was later released on the Wii U Virtual Console in Japan. Square Enix released the Game Boy Advance version on the Wii U Virtual Console in Japan in December 2015.

Nintendo re-released Final Fantasy VI worldwide in September 2017 as part of the company's Super NES/Super Famicom Classic Edition.

The "Pixel Remaster" series version of Final Fantasy VI was released worldwide for Nintendo Switch in April 2023.

=== Mobile platforms and PC ===
Ports of Final Fantasy VI for Android and iOS mobile operating systems were also published in 2014, for Android on January 15, and for iOS on February 6, with features such as new high-resolution graphics with sprites designed by Kazuko Shibuya, who did the original game's artwork, movement in eight directions, and auto-battle.

A Windows PC port, itself a port of the Android version, was released for Windows PC via Steam on December 16, 2015. Another port from the "Pixel Remaster" line was released on Steam on February 23, 2022.

=== Xbox Series X & S ===
The "Pixel Remaster series" version of Final Fantasy VI was announced and launched for Xbox Series X/S in September 2024, marking the first release of the game alongside the other NES/SNES entries of the series on any Xbox consoles.

== Reception ==
=== Initial ===
Reception

Review scores
Publication	Score
Edge	8/10
Electronic Gaming Monthly	9/10, 9/10, 9/10, 9/10
Famitsu	9/10, 8/10, 10/10, 10/10
Game Informer	9.5/10
Maniac	90%

Awards
Publication	Award
Electronic Gaming Monthly	Best Role-Playing Game, Best Japanese Role-Playing Game, Best Music for a Cartridge-Based Game, Game of the Month"
GameFan Megawards	Role Playing Game of the Year, Best Music
VideoGames	Best Role-Playing Game

Final Fantasy VI received critical acclaim and was commercially successful in Japan upon release. In mid-1994, Square's publicity department reported that the game had sold 2.55 million copies in Japan, where it became the best-selling video game of 1994. In the United States, where it went on sale in the last quarter of 1994, it was the top-selling Super NES game in October and became the year's eighth best-selling Super NES cartridge. Despite this, it was not a commercial success in that region, according to Sakaguchi. As of March 2003, the game had shipped 3.48 million copies worldwide, with 2.62 million of those copies being shipped in Japan and 860,000 abroad. Final Fantasy Collection sold over 400,000 copies in 1999, making it the 31st-best-selling release of that year in Japan. Final Fantasy Anthology has sold approximately 364,000 copies in North America. Final Fantasy VI Advance sold over 223,000 copies in Japan by the end of 2006, one month after release.

GamePro rated it 4.5 out of 5 in graphics and a perfect 5.0 in sound, control, and fun factor, stating that "characters, plotlines, and multiple-choice scenarios all combine to form one fantastic game!" The four reviewers of Electronic Gaming Monthly found that it had set the new standard for excellence in RPGs. They particularly praised the graphics, music, and the strong emotional involvement of the story. It won several awards from Electronic Gaming Monthly in their 1994 video game awards, including Best Role-Playing Game, Best Japanese Role-Playing Game, and Best Music for a Cartridge-Based Game. Additionally, they ranked the game ninth in their 1997 list of the 100 greatest console games of all time. ''Famitsu gave Final Fantasy VI some of their highest scores of 1994. Nintendo Power said it had improved sound and graphics over its predecessors, and the game's broadened thematic scope. Moreover, they suggested that "with so much story and variation of play ... fans may become lost in the world for months at a time". Nintendo Power also opined that the game plot was "not particularly inventive" and the "story is often sappy–not written for an American audience".

In 1997, Nintendo Power ranked it as the eighth greatest Nintendo game, saying it "had everything you could want—heroes, world-shattering events, magic, mindless evil—plus Interceptor the wonder dog!" The same year, GamePro said it "still remains one of the most fun, innovative, and challenging RPGs to date". In 1996, Next Generation said the scene in which Terra cares for a village of orphaned children "can perhaps be safely named as the series' finest hour... no other game series has tackled such big issues, or reached such a level of emotional depth and complexity".

=== Retrospective ===
Review aggregators report strong scores across multiple releases, with most versions receiving scores in the high 80s, to 90s, reflecting continued critical acclaim.

Reception

Aggregate scores
Aggregator	Score
GameRankings	GBA: 91% SNES: 93%
Metacritic	GBA: 92/100; IOS: 91/100; PC(Pixel Remaster): 88/100

Review scores
Publication	Score
Famitsu	GBA: 31/40; PS: 54/60
GameSpot	GBA: 8.9/10; PS: 8.1/10
IGN	GBA: 9/10; WII: 9.5/10
RPGamer	SNES: 10/10
TouchArcade	iOS(Pixel Remaster): 4.5/5

Final Fantasy Collection received 54 out of 60 points from Weekly Famitsu, scored by a panel of six reviewers. IGN described the graphics of the PlayStation re-release as "beautiful and stunning", reflecting that, at the time of its release, "Final Fantasy III... represented everything an RPG should be", inspiring statistic growth systems that would later influence titles like Wild Arms and Suikoden. Moreover, they praised its gameplay and storyline, claiming that these aspects took "all... preceding RPG concepts and either came up with something completely new or refined them enough to make them its own", creating an atmosphere in which "[players] won't find it difficult to get past the simplistic graphics or seemingly out-dated gameplay conventions and become involved". RPGamer gave a perfect rating to both the original game and its PlayStation re-release, citing its gameplay as "self-explanatory enough that most any player could pick up the game and customize their characters' equipment", while praising its music as "a 16-bit masterpiece". Joe Juba of Game Informer called the split between the World of Balance and World of Ruin one of the game's distinguishing features, citing its non-linear, freeform nature, a contrast to the standard linear gameplay of the first half. Calling it a "pioneering approach" to wander the land reassembling your former team, he noted that it made the narrative "largely player-driven", calling it part of the basic structure that would later be used by open world games.

The game's release for the Game Boy Advance also garnered praise. The Game Boy Advance re-release was named eighth best Game Boy Advance game of all time in IGN's feature reflecting on the Game Boy Advance's long lifespan. Official Nintendo Magazine ranked the GBA version of the game 32nd on a list of greatest Nintendo games in 2009. Final Fantasy VI is often regarded as one of the best titles in the series, and one of the best role-playing video games ever created according to multiple websites. Readers of the Japanese magazine Famitsu voted it as the 25th best game of all time. In an updated version of the "Top 100" list in 2007, IGN ranked Final Fantasy VI as the ninth top game of all time, above all other Final Fantasy games in the series. They continued to cite the game's character development, and especially noted Kefka as one of the most memorable villains in RPG history. Nintendo Power listed the ending to Final Fantasy VI as one of the best finales, citing the narrative and cast variety. Time Extension included the game on their "Best JRPGs of All Time" list.

The 2022 Pixel Remaster release for PC and mobile also received positive reviews. RPGamer described it as bringing "the definitive version of a 28-year-old game to today's audiences," praising its modern enhancements, while honoring the spirit of the original game. CGMagazine called it "an accessibly modern yet aesthetically authentic re-release of an essential RPG," noting that the updated visuals and improved resolution offered a net positive over previous versions.

== Legacy ==
Following Final Fantasy VI, Square began testing for its next entry Final Fantasy VII on the Nintendo 64, but technical issues, escalating cartridge costs and the higher storage capacity of CD technology persuaded Square to move VII and all their subsequent titles onto the PlayStation. During early testing on 3D development software, the team rendered a battle involving Final Fantasy VI characters Terra, Locke and Shadow. The decision to move to PlayStation soured the relations between Square and Nintendo. Due to this, Final Fantasy VI was the last series title to release on a Nintendo platform until Final Fantasy Crystal Chronicles came out on the Nintendo GameCube in 2003. It was also the last new mainline Final Fantasy game to come to a Nintendo platform until 2018 when the abridged Final Fantasy XV: Pocket Edition was released on Nintendo Switch, followed by the subsequent rereleases of Final Fantasy VII, VIII, IX, X, X-2 and XII throughout 2019, and ports of Final Fantasy VII Remake, Final Fantasy VII Rebirth and Final Fantasy XIV releasing on Nintendo Switch 2 throughout 2026. Final Fantasy VII Revelation, the third entry in the Final Fantasy VII Remake trilogy, will be the first new mainline entry to be developed for a Nintendo console since VI when it releases in April 2027 for Nintendo Switch 2. Final Fantasy VI was included in the Super NES Classic Edition under its original titling as Final Fantasy III for the North American and European release in September 2017.

The game celebrated its 30th anniversary in 2024, with developers reflecting on how its shift toward a character-driven narrative, where every character acts as a protagonist, influenced the overarching design philosophy of the franchise. In the anniversary interview, Nomura described Final Fantasy VI as the culmination of the pixel art era, noting that the transition between VI and VII marked a major turning point for the series both technically and creatively, and that he retains a strong personal attachment to the game.

== See also ==
- List of Square Enix video game franchises
