= Yoshinori Kitase =

Japanese game director (born 1966)

- 北瀬 佳範
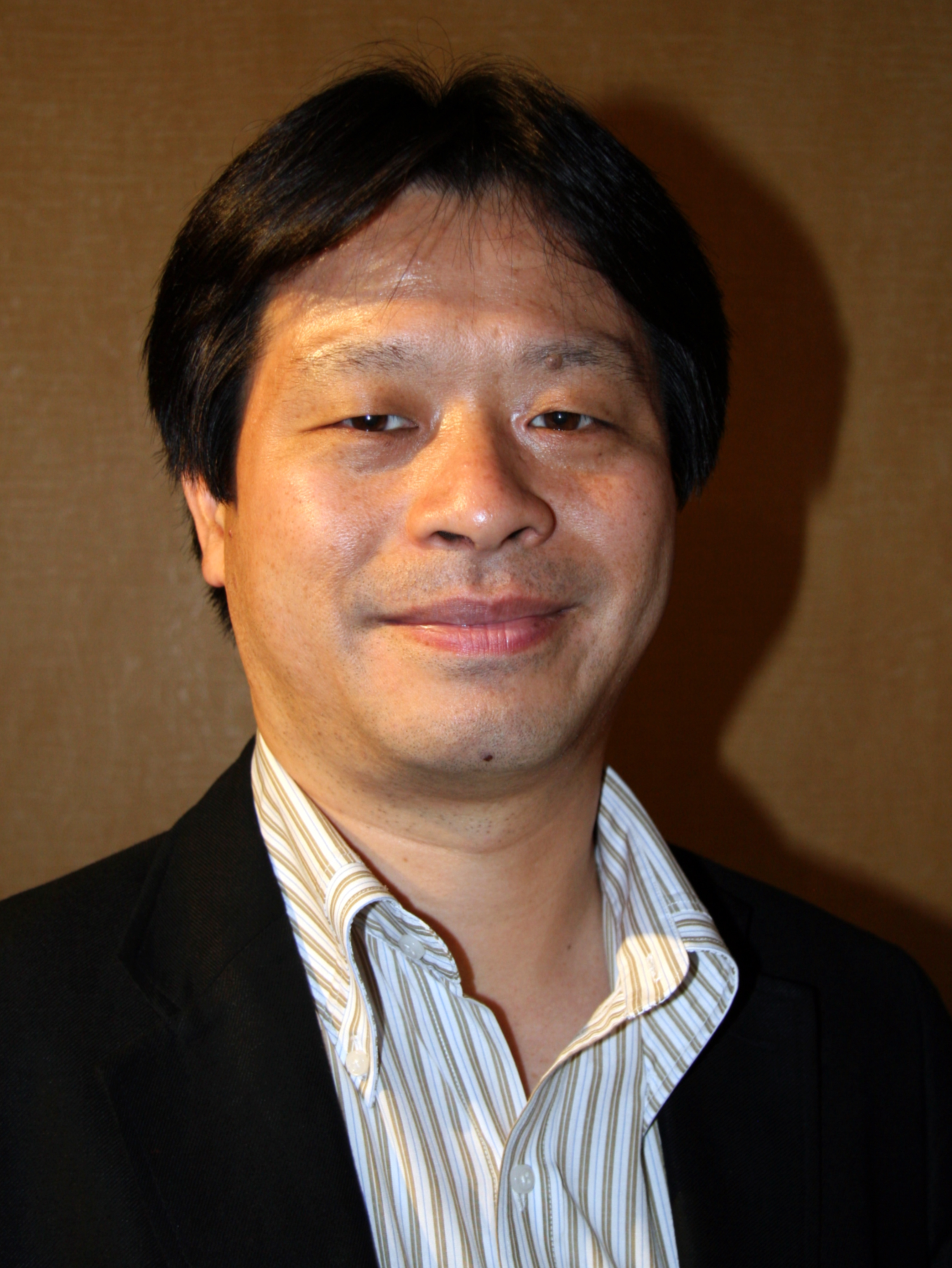
- Kitase at the 2009 E3
- Born: September 23, 1966 (age 60); Japan
- Education: Nihon University
- Occupations: Company director, game producer
- Years active: 1990–present
- Employer: Square Enix
- Known for: Final Fantasy series Chrono Trigger

Yoshinori Kitase (北瀬 佳範, Kitase Yoshinori; born September 23, 1966) is a Japanese company director, video game producer and former game director working for Square Enix. He is known for directing Final Fantasy VI, Chrono Trigger, Final Fantasy VII, Final Fantasy VIII and Final Fantasy X, and for producing the Final Fantasy X, Final Fantasy XIII and Final Fantasy VII Remake series.

Kitase currently serves as a member of the board of directors at both Square Enix Co, Ltd and Square Enix Holdings as well as the executive officer of Square Enix's Creative Studios 1 and 2 as well as the studio head for the latter.

He has also served as the Final Fantasy series brand manager since 2021.

He was the head of Square Enix's Creative Business Unit 1 as well as Business Division 1 during their entire respective existences as well as a Corporate Executive. He was also part of the Final Fantasy Committee that was tasked with keeping the franchise's releases and content consistent.

== Biography ==
In July 1978, at the age of 11, Kitase watched the movie Star Wars for the first time and was deeply impressed with it. He later examined the making-of video to it and became interested in the creative process of the film industry. Kitase decided to attend the Nihon University College of Art and studied screenwriting and filmmaking. Although he enjoyed filming, he showed a much greater passion for post-production editing as he felt it allowed him to give the footage a completely new meaning and to appeal to the viewers' feelings. In his first year after the graduation, Kitase worked at a small animation studio that produced animated television programs and commercials. When he played Final Fantasy for the first time, he considered a switch to the game industry as he felt that it had potential when it came to animation and storytelling. Despite having no software development knowledge, he applied at the game development company Square and was hired in March 1990. In the ten years to follow, he gathered experience as an "event scripter", directing the characters' movements and facial expressions on the game screen as well as setting the timings and music transitions. He has compared this work to directing film actors. Kitase continued directing cutscenes in spite of filling other roles in later projects; for example, he directed part of the event scenes in Final Fantasy VIII and was event planner for the Nibelheim section of Crisis Core: Final Fantasy VII.

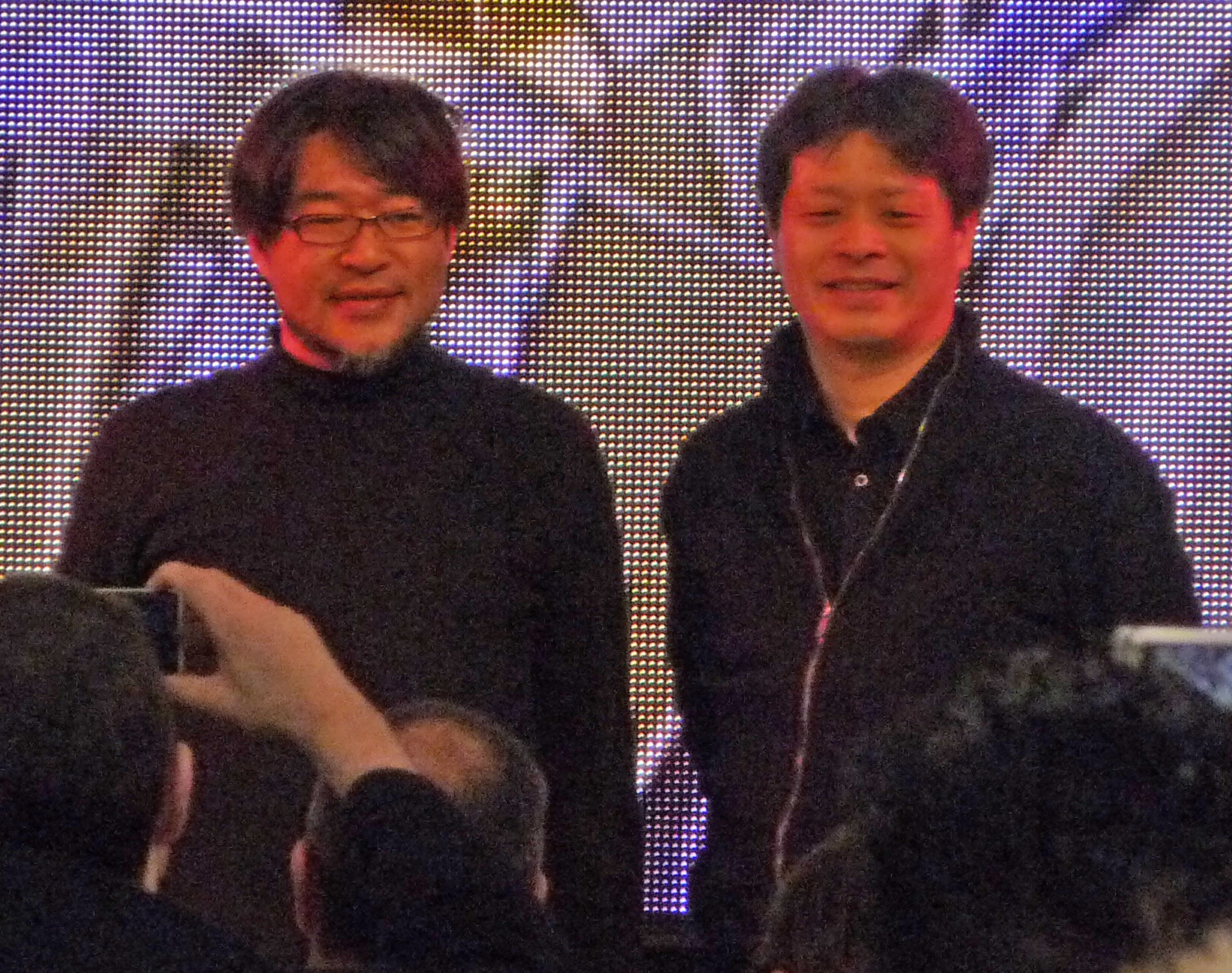
Yoshinori Kitase (right) and art director Isamu Kamikokuryo (left) at HMV's Final Fantasy XIII launch event in London in March, 2010

When many players responded to the sci-fi world of Final Fantasy VII and Final Fantasy VIII by requesting a "simple fantasy world", Kitase tried to expand the definition of the word "fantasy" beyond that of a medieval European setting. This led to Southeast Asia being the backdrop for Final Fantasy X. Kitase referred to Final Fantasy VII and its protagonist Cloud Strife as his favorite game and character, respectively. In an interview, he said that he loves first-person shooters. Kitase supervised the Final Fantasy VII: Technical Demo for PS3. Final Fantasy creator Hironobu Sakaguchi feels that he "handed the torch to" Kitase as far as heading the series is concerned.

== Works ==
=== Video games ===
Year	Title	Role(s)
1991	Final Fantasy Adventure	Game design, scenario
1992	Romancing SaGa	Field map design
1992	Final Fantasy V	Field planner, event planner, scenario
1994	Final Fantasy VI	Director, event planner, scenario
1995	Chrono Trigger	Director, scenario
1997	Final Fantasy VII	Director, story
1999	Final Fantasy VIII	Director, story
2001	Final Fantasy X	Chief director, producer, scenario
2002	Kingdom Hearts	Co-producer
2003	Final Fantasy X-2	Producer, scenario
2004	Before Crisis: Final Fantasy VII	Executive producer
2004	Kingdom Hearts: Chain of Memories	Producer
2005	Kingdom Hearts II	Co-producer
2006	Dirge of Cerberus: Final Fantasy VII	Producer
2006	Dirge of Cerberus Lost Episode: Final Fantasy VII	Executive producer
2006	Final Fantasy V Advance	Supervisor
2006	Final Fantasy VI Advance	Supervisor
2007	Crisis Core: Final Fantasy VII	Executive producer, event planner
2008	Sigma Harmonics	Producer
2008	Dissidia Final Fantasy	Producer
2009	Final Fantasy XIII	Producer
2010	The 3rd Birthday	Producer
2011	Final Fantasy Type-0	Producer
2011	Final Fantasy XIII-2	Producer
2013	Lightning Returns: Final Fantasy XIII	Producer
2013	Final Fantasy X/X-2 HD Remaster	Producer
2014	Final Fantasy VII G-Bike	Executive producer
2015	Mobius Final Fantasy	Producer
2016	Final Fantasy XV	Special thanks, original producer^{[A]}
2017	Flame vs Blaze	Executive producer
2019	Final Fantasy VIII Remastered	Special thanks, supervisor
2020	Final Fantasy VII Remake	Producer
2021	Final Fantasy Pixel Remaster	Supervisor
2021	Final Fantasy II Pixel Remaster	Supervisor
2021	Final Fantasy III Pixel Remaster	Supervisor
2021	Final Fantasy IV Pixel Remaster	Supervisor
2021	Final Fantasy V Pixel Remaster	Supervisor
2021	Final Fantasy VII: The First Soldier	Executive producer
2022	Final Fantasy VI Pixel Remaster	Supervisor
2022	Chocobo GP	Executive producer
2022	Crisis Core: Final Fantasy VII Reunion	Executive producer
2023	Final Fantasy VII: Ever Crisis	Executive producer
2024	Final Fantasy VII Rebirth	Producer
2026	Final Fantasy XIV: Dawntrail (Patch 7.56)	Guest creator (Keybound Brawler)
2027	Final Fantasy VII Revelation	Producer

=== Other media ===
Year	Title	Credit(s)
1995	Final Fantasy VI The Interactive CG Game	Director
1999	Party from Final Fantasy VIII	Director, producer
2001	Final Fantasy: The Spirits Within	Thanks
2005	Final Fantasy VII Technical Demo for PS3	Producer
2005	Final Fantasy VII: Advent Children	Producer
2005	Last Order: Final Fantasy VII	Executive producer
2009	Final Fantasy VII: Advent Children Complete	Producer
2009	On the Way to a Smile - Episode: Denzel	Executive producer
2016	Kingsglaive: Final Fantasy XV	Special thanks

=== Additional credits ===
Year	Title	Credit(s)
1998	Xenogears (Japanese version)	Cooperation
1998	Ehrgeiz	FF VII staff
1999	Chrono Cross (Japanese version)	Development cooperation
2002	Unlimited Saga	Special thanks
2003	Hanjuku Hero Tai 3D	Development cooperation
2004	Dragon Quest & Final Fantasy in Itadaki Street Special	Final Fantasy part cooperation
2005	Romancing SaGa	Special thanks
2006	Dragon Quest & Final Fantasy in Itadaki Street Portable	Final Fantasy part cooperation
2006	Dawn of Mana	Special thanks
2007	Heroes of Mana	Special thanks
2009	Final Fantasy: The 4 Heroes of Light	Special thanks
2010	Final Fantasy XIV	Crystal tools
2011	Dissidia 012: Final Fantasy	Special thanks
2012	Theatrhythm Final Fantasy	Special thanks
2013	Final Fantasy: All The Bravest	Special thanks
2014	Theatrhythm Final Fantasy: Curtain Call	Special thanks
2015	Final Fantasy X/X-2 HD Remaster for PlayStation 4	Special thanks
2015	Final Fantasy: Brave Exvius	Special thanks
2015	Dissidia Final Fantasy (2015 video game) Arcade	Special thanks
2016	Final Fantasy X/X-2 HD Remaster for Microsoft Windows	Special thanks
2017	Final Fantasy XIV: Heavensward (Patch 3.56)	Special thanks
2017	Final Fantasy XIV: Stormblood	Special thanks
2017	Pictologica Final Fantasy	Special thanks
2017	Itadaki Street: Dragon Quest and Final Fantasy 30th Anniversary	Special thanks
2017	Final Fantasy Dimensions II	Special thanks
2018	Dissidia Final Fantasy NT	Special thanks
2018	Chrono Trigger Upgrade Version	Special thanks
2018	Super Smash Bros. Ultimate	Original game supervisor
2019	Final Fantasy XIV: Shadowbringers	Special thanks
2019	Romancing SaGa 3 remaster	Executive officer
2019	SaGa: Scarlet Grace Ambitions English Version	Executive officer
2019	War of the Visions: Final Fantasy Brave Exvius	Special thanks
2019	Star Ocean: First Departure R	Vice president
2020	Final Fantasy Crystal Chronicles Remastered Edition	Vice president
2020	Collection of SaGa	Executive officer
2020	Kingdom Hearts: Melody of Memory	Vice president
2020	Romancing SaGa Re;univerSe	Executive officer
2021	SaGa Frontier Remastered	Executive officer
2021	Neo: The World Ends with You	Vice president
2021	Dungeon Encounters	Vice president
2021	Final Fantasy XIV: Endwalker	Special thanks
2022	Stranger of Paradise: Final Fantasy Origin	Vice president
2022	Chrono Cross The Radical Dreamers Edition	Vice president
2022	Star Ocean: The Divine Force	Vice president
2022	Tactics Ogre: Reborn	Vice president
2022	Romancing SaGa Minstrel Song Remastered	Executive officer
2023	Theatrhythm Final Bar Line	Vice president
2023	Final Fantasy XVI	Special thanks
2023	Star Ocean: The Second Story R	Vice president
2024	Foamstars	Square Enix special tester
2024	SaGa Emerald Beyond	Vice president
2024	Final Fantasy XIV: Dawntrail	Special thanks
2024	Romancing SaGa 2: Revenge of the Seven	Head of studio
2025	SaGa Frontier 2 Remastered	Head of studio

== Notes ==
- ^{A} Kitase was a producer on Final Fantasy XV until the end of 2013.
