= Fran (Final Fantasy) =

Fictional character in Final Fantasy

- Final Fantasy character
- Fran, as she appears in Final Fantasy XII.
- First appearance: Final Fantasy XII (2006)
- Designed by: Akihiko Yoshida
- Voiced by: EN: Nicole Fantl; JA: Rika Fukami

Fran (Japanese: フラン, Hepburn: Furan) is a character in the Final Fantasy series of video games. She is a member of the Viera race, a group of rabbit-like humanoid people. She appears in Final Fantasy XII, having left her tribe and worked as a copilot to the pirate Balthier. Her character design was created by Akihiko Yoshida. She is voiced by Nicole Fantl in English and by Rika Fukami in Japanese. Her English voice performance took inspiration from Icelandic singer Björk, which left Square Enix skeptical but eventually sated with their explanations. Fran later appears in the Nintendo DS sequel Final Fantasy XII: Revenant Wings.

Fran has received mostly popular reception since her debut and is noted for having popularized the fictional Viera race. She is often regarded as one of the highlights of Final Fantasy XII's cast and in the series in general and has been praised for her design by multiple critics. She is considered a rare example of a non-white female character in video games, though this assessment is considered by some to be problematic due to racial implications.

== Concept and creation ==
Fran's visual appearance was designed by Akihiko Yoshida and her story was written by Daisuke Watanabe for Final Fantasy XII, which had a development period of 2001 to 2006. She is a Viera, a humanoid species that resembles rabbits. She is also co-pilot to her friend Balthier and the mechanic to their ship, the Strahl. Like all Viera, she is exceptionally sensitive to the magical mist that permeates Ivalice, the setting of Final Fantasy XII, which can send her into a rage. The decision to feature non-human species in the world of XII was due to wanting to feature different races and social classes and to represent real-world history. Characters' outfits in XII were made to show more skin due to the setting being hot.

Fran was voiced by Nicole Fantl in English and by Rika Fukami in Japanese, while her motion capture work was performed by Hiroko Harada and Kouhei Takeda. Fukami had her speak in a "straightforward, slightly gruff" fashion. Localizer Alexander O. Smith took inspiration in writing Fran's English dialogue from Icelandic singer Björk, casting for people who can actualize that inspiration. Smith said that he ideally wanted Björk to be cast. Square Enix was initially skeptical of the direction they were taking with Fran's voice as it was significantly different from the Japanese version to a larger extent than the other lead characters, but the staff was able to convince them by explaining that they were trying a new take on her Viera race. Smith identified Fran and the other Viera as some of his favorite characters to write in Final Fantasy XII due to their Icelandic accents.

== Appearances ==
Before the events of Final Fantasy XII, Fran lived with her sisters Jote and Mjrn in Eruyt Village, a secluded Viera settlement in Golmore Woods, but became restless and desired to see the outside world. This was a major source of conflict between her and the other Viera, especially her sister Jote, who served as the village matriarch. Fran argued that although all Viera begin their lives in the forest, they are not necessarily bound to remain there to the end. When the party encounters an impassable Viera barrier, Fran is forced to return to her former village and ask for help. She learns from Jote that their sister Mjrn has run off. When Fran finds her and brings her back, Mjrn reveals she wishes to leave Golmore, but Fran advises her against doing so, relating how her own independence has cost her her family and her spirituality with Golmore. After Fran departs, she feels as though Jote cares for her, despite her reluctance to say as much.

She later appears in the Nintendo DS sequel Revenant Wings alongside Balthier, which is set on a place called the Sky Continent. She and Balthier initially work to destroy the auralith, one of multiple crystals that keep the Sky Continent afloat that protagonists Vaan and Penelo are trying to protect, though it is later explained that they were trying to prevent the souls of a people called the aegyl which reside in the auralith from being taken. In battle, Fran uses status effects against opponents, a unique combat ability among the playable cast. She also appears as a playable character in Itadaki Street Portable. She was included in Dissidia Final Fantasy Opera Omnia as a playable character, where she has the unique ability Viera Commandments.

== Critical reception ==
Fran has received mostly positive reception. She is credited with popularizing the Viera race by PCGamesN. Chris Carter and Joe Juba, writing for Game Informer and Destructoid respectively, both enjoyed Fran, regarding her and Balthier as standout characters among Final Fantasy XII's cast. David Lozada and Aoife Wilson, writing for Game Revolution and Vice respectively, regarded her as a standout character in the Final Fantasy series, with the latter regarded a scene of her going into a rage as one of the most memorable in the series. She did not rank among a list of favorite female Final Fantasy characters by Japanese fans, which caused Mollie L. Patterson of Electronic Gaming Monthly disappointment. The Verge writer Ash Parrish said that Fran is her favorite character in the series' 35-year history.

Writers for IGN and Complex found her design attractive, with the former drawing a comparison between Fran and the Playboy bunny. Emma Boyes for IGN and Nadia Oxford for USGamer both enjoyed Fran's design in spite of the impracticality of her armor and heels. Jef Rouner for Houston Press found her design attractive as well, identifying her as the hottest furry character. He noted her height, accent, and figure as highlights. Rouner also noted her as a rare example of black women in games, though he noted that she seemed to be more of an example of "exotic flavoring" due to her species. Responding to this assessment, Alisha Karabinus of NYM Gamer expressed discomfort at the idea of identifying a non-human character as black, commenting that "there's a lot to unpack" with this. Philip Boyes of Eurogamer took issue with Fran's portrayal, particularly how her design demonstrates "othering" and a "male fantasy". Greg Vallentin of Video Gamer found her voice acting to be "cringey", while writer Mattie Brice discussed how her accent is meant to differentiate her from the rest of the cast. Brice found her exotic, citing her accent, skin color, and species, though she felt that she had the least personality of the main cast.

The staff of GamesRadar+ in 2012 named her one of the sexiest new characters introduced in video games in the last decade, describing her as having "striking white hair, which frames a delicate face with scarlet eyes and caramel skin" while at the same time praising her athletic figure. They further praised her voice as "unique and intriguing", appreciating the English voice over's Icelandic tones though stating the actress felt "just a tad too girlish and innocent" to belong to someone of Fran's appearance, and additionally expressing the appeal of her Japanese voice. However, they also emphasized her personality, stating that while she was extremely tough and "a bit feral", she was also "endearingly tragic" due to giving up her homeland and family for Balthier.

Rémi Lopez in the book La Légende Final Fantasy XII et Ivalice noted that while anthropomorphic characters were not uncommon in the series, Fran was possibly the most intimidating character of the game. He further added that while some sources compared her relationship with Balthier to that of Star Wars characters Chewbacca and Han Solo respectively, their relationship seemed to be one more of mutual respect with the suggestions of a "forbidden romance". Lopez noted that Fran also represents a different idea of the concept of freedom compared to the rest of the cast, shown as a poisoned gift in that it severs her roots with her people, and that while it emphasizes her strength of her character the cost is compounded more by her longer lifespan. This is further reflected in her encouraging her sister to remain with her people, and moreso cold attitude towards Balthier, as she would undoubtedly end up seeing him grow old and die. Lastly Lopez noted that while her appearance in Revenant Wings offered little in ways of expanding her character, he enjoyed that her dialogue reflected on her choices regarding freedom how it affected her view on others to live their own lives.
