= List of Mobile Suit Victory Gundam characters =

This is a list of fictional characters from the Japanese science fiction anime television series Mobile Suit Victory Gundam. Victory Gundam is well known for its extremely high casualty rate on both sides in the conflict that takes place in this show.

== Main characters ==
Üso Ewin
Voiced by: Daisuke Sakaguchi
Üso is an 13-year-old illegal immigrant on Earth at Point Kasarelia, and eventually ends up joining the League Militaire in fending off the Zanscare Empire, when the soldiers ruthlessly slaughtered many innocent civilians in Woowig. He is the pilot of the Victory Gundam, and subsequently the Victory 2 Gundam. Üso is constantly left scarred by the reality of war, and the people that keep dying to protect him and their cause. Üso is good friends with Shakti Karin, the daughter of Zanscare Queen Maria Pia Armonia. According to Üso, the name of his and Shakti's hometown, Kasarelia, means "hello" or "goodbye" in a Northern Pacific language. The word eventually becomes somewhat of a rallying call for them. Üso also makes enemies with Chronicle Asher, Shakti's uncle and Queen Maria's younger brother, and later on, Katejina Loos.
Being 13 years old, Üso is the youngest Universal Century Gundam protagonist to date. Many fans of the Gundam series believe Ewin to be the great-grandson of another character, Char Aznable; this is due to the last name of Ewin's mother being "Miguel", being the same as Char's last lover, Nanai Miguel from Char's Counterattack. The time frame (sixty years had passed between both series) also gives the theory some weight; however, Yoshiyuki Tomino, creator of the Gundam series, denied such a theory as being true, though the production group planned to use this idea.
Shakti Kareen
Voiced by: Yumi Kuroda
Shakti is an 11-year-old illegal Earth immigrant who shares a close bond with Üso. She is a caring person who has trouble adjusting to the realities of war that constantly surround her. Her caring personality can be seen as she takes care of the orphaned baby Karlmann. Shakti tries to reason with members of Zanscare to show them the error of their ways and as a result, is constantly kidnapped. She is the daughter of Zanscare's Queen Maria and the niece of Üso's main rival, Cronicle Asher.
Katejina Loos
Voiced by: Kumiko Watanabe (Japanese); Nicole Oliver (Dynasty Warriors Gundam 2 & 3) (English)
Katejina Loos (カテジナ・ルース, Katejina Rūsu) is a strong-willed seventeen-year-old girl from the fictional European city Woowig. Separated from her parents around the time of the destruction of her home town by the invading BESPA forces of the Zanscare Empire, Katejina joins the League Militaire with young Üso Ewin; however, Katejina disapproves of the League's reliance on Üso as a Gundam pilot due to the mounting toll on his young body and mind. Katejina is captured by Lt. Chronicle Asher and taken to the Zanscare Empire, where she becomes Chronicle's personal assistant. Later, she is trained as a soldier and becomes a mobile suit ace; it is during this period that her attraction to Chronicle, and hatred of Üso, begins to grow. Her personal support for Maria's matriarchal ideals, her annoyance at Üso's continual attempts to interfere with what she views as her true happiness, and her sheer admiration for Chronicle turn her into a dangerous Zanscare loyalist. She and Üso battle on several occasions, where she succeeds in killing several members of the Strike Team and Odelo Henrik in the process. However, she ultimately loses her memory while fighting Üso during the Battle of Angel Halo. After Üso defeats her in this battle, Katejina suffers severe brain damage: she loses her sight and her memories, and suffers irreversible mental damage from the fight. She is last seen wandering the streets as a beggar, homeless and forgotten. Despite his predilection for killing off several main characters during the final phases of his shows, producer Yoshiyuki Tomino allowed Katejina to live, saying "life was a heavier punishment for her."
Katejina is a playable character in Dynasty Warriors: Gundam 2 and Dynasty Warriors: Gundam 3 with her mobile suit Gottrlatan.
Cronicle Asher
Voiced by: Tomoyuki Dan
Cronicle Asher is one of Zanscare's top pilots and one of the main antagonists in the series. He quickly forms a rivalry with Üso early on as Üso ejects him from his Shokew mobile suit and takes control of it. This event leaves him feeling humiliated and he is determined to recover the Shokew from Üso. Asher has a code of honor of sorts, and usually will not engage with non-combatants such as civilians and children. He disapproves of his fellow soldiers who bomb and destroy an area to draw out just one mobile suit, but will follow when a superior officer gives the exact same orders. Like most of Zanscare's remaining members, he is killed during the final battle. He is the younger brother of Queen Maria and the uncle of Shakti.

== Recurring characters ==
=== League Militaire ===
Marbet Fingerhat
Voiced by: Ayako Shiraishi
Marbet is one of League Milataire's mobile suit pilots. She is usually calm and caring and does not normally show anger, but can be very opinionated. Marbet was originally designated to be the Victory Gundam's pilot, but she suffered a leg injury during a battle before the Gundam could be completed. Once the Victory becomes mass produced, Marbet pilots one of the units alongside Üso and Oliver. She initially dislikes Oliver, referring to him as a pimp, but the two eventually marry and she becomes pregnant with his child.
Suzy Relane
Voiced by: Satomi Koorogi
Suzy is an orphaned child and the younger sister of Odelo. Her parents were executed via guillotine by the Zanscare Empire. She usually helps Shakti take care of Karlmann.
Tomache Massarik
Voiced by: Tomokazu Seki
Tomache is a 17 year old cadet for the League Militaire. His father, Batstraff, was a worker at the orbital energy satellite Hiland. Tomache was captured by BESPA forces along with other children from Hiland, before being rescued by Üso and Marbet. Like Odelo, he originally had more of a support role before becoming a mobile suit pilot. Tomache's ultimate fate in the series is unknown and he is presumed to have been killed in the final battle as he does not reappear after the battle.
Oliver Inoue
Voiced by: Keiichi Sonobe
Oliver is the leader of the League Militaire's Shrike Team. He pilots one of the Victory Gundam units alongside Üso and Marbet. He marries Marbet and the two have a child that is born at the war's end. Oliver is killed when he detached his Core Fighter and rammed it into a battleship.
Muller Miguel
Voiced by: Mako Hyoudou
Muller is Üso's mother and Hangelg's wife. She is an engineer who works for what is left of Anaheim Electronics and develops the Victory 2 "V2" Gundam for her son. She is killed in a battle after a Zanscare ship explodes, with the debris decapitating her.
Hangelg Ewin
Voiced by: Kenyuu Horiuchi
Hangelg is Üso's father and Muller's husband. He is one of the founders and leader of the League Militaire, the rebel group that stands in opposition to the Zanscare Empire as the Earth Federation was severely weakened and stagnant at the time of the invasion.
Jinn Geneham
Voiced by: Ginzo Matsuo
Jinn is a member of the League Militaire who acts as the organization's leader in Hangelg's place and is the captain of the Reinforce Junior.
Romero Marabal
Voiced by: Chafurin
Odelo Henrik
Voiced by: Masayuki Nakata
Odelo is the older brother of Suzy and acts as an older brother figure to Üso and Warren. His parents were executed via guillotine by the Zanscare Empire. Odelo initially acts in a support role for the League Militaire before becoming a mobile suit pilot. He is killed in the final battle by Katejina.
Yuca Meilasch
Voiced by: Atsuko Tanaka

=== Shrike Team ===
The Shrike Team is an all-female mobile suit squadron founded by Oliver Inoe, one of the Victory Gundam pilots, and later led by Junko Jenko. The team operates as part of the League Militaire. Several of the members are named after female singers.

Helen Jackson
Voiced by: Rika Fukami
Helen is one of the Shrike Team's pilots. She is killed while trying to defend a League Militaire aircraft.
Mahalia Merrill
Voiced by: Mari Maruta
Mahalia is one of the Shrike Team's pilots. She was orphaned at an early age when her parents and brother died in an accident. Eager to avenge Helen's death, Mahalia accidentally causes a battle to break out in the neutral Arti Gibraltar after brandishing her Gun-EZ's beam rifle in front of BESPA forces. She is killed in the ensuing battle after her suit is damaged and the cockpit explodes.
Kate Bush
Voiced by: Shinobu Adachi
Kate is one of the Shrike Team's pilots. During the battle at Arti Gibraltar Kate holds up the damaged rail of the spaceport's mass driver so that a shuttle could take off. This leaves her vulnerable and her suit is struck in the cockpit by Kwan Lee, killing her.
Peggy Lee
Voiced by: Kae Araki
Peggy is one of the Shrike Team's pilots. She is injured after her Gun-EZ is damaged in the battle following the surprise attack on Zanscare's capitol at Amelia. She uses her heavily damaged mobile suit to help Üso and the others re-enter the colony, but she becomes involved in a fight with Cronicle Asher, who kills her during the battle.
Junko Jenko
Voiced by: Yuko Kobayashi
Junko is one of the Shrike Team's pilots and becomes its leader after joining the crew of the Reinforce. Her fighting style tends to be reckless, which often worries her comrades. She has somewhat of a rivalry with Marbet due to the affection the two have for Oliver. Junko dies near the middle of the war, being caught in an explosion from a bomb that Cronicle Asher planted inside the Kelias Guilie's Big Cannon.
Francesca O'Hara
Voiced by: Hiromi Ishikawa
Miliera Katan
Voiced by: Narumi Hidaka
Cony Francis
Voiced by: Satomi Koorogi
Juca Meilasch
Voiced by: Atsuko Tanaka
Miliera Katan
Voiced by: Narumi Hidaka

=== Zanscare Empire ===
Fonse Kagatie
Voiced by: Kaneomi Ooya
Fonse Kagatie is the de facto leader of the Zanscare Empire, using Queen Maria as a figurehead to further his own ideals. Kagatie oversees Zanscare's military operations and is in charge of the military branch BESPA. Formerly a member of the Jupiter Fleet, he is responsible for most of Zanscare's more radical policies, such as exiling people into space and using the guillotine for executions.
Duker Iq
Voiced by: Kazuhiro Nakata
Lupe Cineau
Voiced by: Miki Itou
Goze Baru
Voiced by: Yukitoshi Hori
Fuala Griffon
Voiced by: Ai Orikasa
Tassilo Vago
Voiced by: Hidetoshi Nakamura
Arbeo Pippinden
Voiced by: Junji Kitajima
Queen Maria Pure Armonia
Voiced by: Emi Shinohara
Maria Pure Armonia is the leader of the Zanscare Empire, mother of Shakti, and the older sister of Cronicle Asher. She believes in a matriarchal society and sees most of the world's problems as having been caused by men. Originally living in poverty, Maria became wealthy after learning she had the ability to heal people. Maria is essentially a figurehead for Zanscare, with Fonse Kagatie being the empire's de facto leader. She is double-crossed and killed by Tassilo Vago during the final battle.

=== Other ===
Karlmann Dukartuse
Voiced by: Satomi Koorogi
