= Rika Fukami =

Japanese voice actress, narrator and singer (born 1963)

- 深見 梨加
- Born: August 8, 1963 (age 63); Kyoto Prefecture, Japan
- Occupations: Voice actress; narrator
- Years active: 1982–present
- Agent: Freelance
- Notable credit: Sailor Moon as Sailor Venus
- Height: 155 cm (5 ft 1 in)
- Spouse: Eisuke Tsuda (m. 2000)
- Website: ricafukami88.wixsite.com/official

Rika Fukami (深見 梨加, Fukami Rika; born August 8, 1963) is a Japanese voice actress and narrator. Born in Kyoto Prefecture and raised in Chichibu, Saitama, she was originally a competitor at the NHK Cup National High School Broadcasting Contest while studying at Saitama Prefectural Chichibu High School, before joining Dojinsha Productions and debuting as a voice actress in Tokimeki Tonight. Since then, she has voiced Minako Aino/Sailor Venus in the Sailor Moon series, as well as Fran in Final Fantasy XII, Carmen la Bailaora in Ashita no Nadja, Schaffe in Ninja Senshi Tobikage and Daiko Hayami in New Cutie Honey.

== Biography ==
=== Early life and career ===
Rika Fukami was born on August 8, 1963, in Kyoto Prefecture, and she was raised in Chichibu, Saitama, where she was a member of the chorus club in elementary school. She was originally self-conscious and quiet during her childhood, but in high school she was inspired by how spirited the older students were, so she joined the broadcasting club and subsequently won the top prize at a prefectural tournament of the NHK Cup National High School Broadcasting Contest and participated in the national tournament for two consecutive years.

After graduating from Saitama Prefectural Chichibu High School, she decided to become a freelance announcer, and spent one year at the Tokyo Announcement Academy Department of Broadcasting and Voice Acting to gather information on such things as auditions. Among her part-time work included in-store announcements at department stores and hosted concerts and amusement park hero shows.

After graduating from the school, she passed the audition for Dojinsha Productions and joined the company, making her debut as a voice actress in the anime series Tokimeki Tonight. She subsequently voiced Akina in Futari Daka, Fuyuta Fuyuki in Persia, the Magic Fairy, Yasuka Kashikiri in High School! Kimengumi, Mark in Lupin III Part III, Schaffe in Ninja Senshi Tobikage, a young Kazuya Uesugi in Touch, Ume Takematsu in Robotan, Ruby in Magical Princess Minky Momo: Hold on to Your Dreams, and Ohtawara in Yawara!. She also voiced Prince Tonkari in Creamy Mami: Eien no Once More, as well as a reporter in Creamy Mami, the Magic Angel: Long Goodbye.

=== 1992-present: Sailor Moon, Macross, and Final Fantasy ===
From 1992 to 1997, she voiced Minako Aino/Sailor Venus in the anime adaptation of the magical girl manga Sailor Moon. She reprised her role in the anime's three movies, as well as in several video games part of the franchise. In addition to Sailor Venus, she also voiced minor character Reika Nishimura, as well as the monster Rikoukeidar.

In 1994, she starred as Myung Fang Lone in Macross Plus and Daiko Hayami in New Cutie Honey. She also voiced Renhō in Jungle King Tar-chan, Helen Jackson in Mobile Suit Victory Gundam, Kaguya in Yaiba, Reideen Sayla in Reideen the Superior, Angela in Kurogane Communication, Hamil in Black Heaven, Kira and Iyo in Legend of Himiko, Viola in Zoids: Chaotic Century, and Spoor in Crest of the Stars and its the sequel series Banner of the Stars. She later branched to video game franchises, voicing Lisa in Castlevania: Symphony of the Night, Fran in Final Fantasy XII, and Alex Wesker in Resident Evil: Revelations 2, and she reprised her role as Myung Fang Lone in Macross Ace Frontier.

In the early-2000s, she voiced Majo Prima in Ojamajo Doremi, Ophanimon and Yuriko Kanbara in Digimon Frontier, Suzu Imamura in Full Moon o Sagashite, Natsuhi in Naruto, Carmen la Bailaora in Ashita no Nadja, and Regine in Futari wa Pretty Cure. Subsequently, she was cast as Gira in Black Jack: The Two Doctors of Darkness, Yggdrasil in Digimon Data Squad, Chan in Jyu-Oh-Sei, Nana Sawada in Katekyo Hitman Reborn!, Hajime Yoshino in Appleseed Ex Machina, Kiriko Suma in Psychic Squad, Eriko Oginome in Penguindrum, and Shiki Murasaki in Btooom!. In 2019, she was invited to be a guest at Naka-Kon 2020 in Overland Park, Kansas, but it was cancelled due to the COVID-19 pandemic in Kansas.

In 2020, she won the Kazue Takahashi Award at the 14th Seiyu Awards. She then voiced Grace O'Malley in Fena: Pirate Princess, and she voiced Rui Kisugi in the Lupin the 3rd vs. Cat's Eye crossover.

=== Dub localization, music, and others ===
In addition to anime, she provides the Japanese dub localization for numerous international film and television actors including Catherine Zeta-Jones, Angelina Jolie, Sharon Stone and Jodie Foster. She has also worked as a narrator for factual programming on TBS, NTV, Fuji TV, NHK among others, as well as on commercials for companies and brands such as Fujifilm, KFC, Nippon Kodo, NTT Communications, Shueisha, the Subaru Exiga, and Tokyo Electric Power Company.

Outside of voice acting, she also works as a singer. In 1996, her Sailor Moon song "Prologue" was released as a single, having been part of the 1994 character single "Setsunakute ī". She had five albums released – Hoshizora no Fugue (1993), Mornin'After (1994), La Venus (1994), Yo ni mo Suteki na Monogatari: Mystery Train ni Notte (1995), and Mabushī Kisetsu ni Koi o Shite (1996) – as well as a third single, "24 Crush" (1995). She has also provided vocals for several releases for the rock musical group Sound Horizon.

=== Personal life ===
Fukami was affiliated with Beniya 25-ji and Vi-vo, before going freelance on July 1, 2019.

Fukami's voice type is alto. She once had level three kendama certification. She once hosted the wedding of a close associate while on an overseas tour.

She shares the same birth date as her late Sailor Moon co-star Emi Shinohara, and they even had a joint birthday concert together, performing as the duo Funky Twins on their 33rd birthday in 1996.

By 2014, she became obsessed with the Funabashi mascot Funassyi, with her husband and fellow actor Eisuke Tsuda discussing this to the afternoon talk show Lion no Gokigen'yō as an issue on their October 14, 2014, episode.

== Filmography ==
=== Television animation ===
Year	Work	Role	Source
1982	Tokimeki Tonight	Michael	
1984	Futari Daka	Akina	
1984	Persia, the Magic Fairy	Fuyuta Fuyuki	
1985	Dirty Pair	Secretary, Momoko	
1985	High School! Kimengumi	Yasuka Kashikiri	
1985	Lupin III Part III	Mark	
1985	Ninja Senshi Tobikage	Schaffe	
1985	Touch	Kazuya Uesugi (young), Nitta's mother	
1986	Anmitsu Hime	Mrs. ET	
1986	Robotan	Ume Takematsu	
1987	City Hunter	Makoto Tomomura, Miho Kōenji, Jiro	
1987	Mami the Psychic	Kōji Tabata	
1989	Sally the Witch 2	Hiroko	
1990	Genma Wars: Eve of Mythology	Oshun	
1991	Magical Princess Minky Momo: Hold on to Your Dreams	Ruby	
1991	Yawara!	Ohtawara	
1992	Genki Bakuhatsu Ganbaruger	Yayoi Kirigakure, Kei Takeda, Akie Yūki	
1992–1997	Sailor Moon	Minako Aino/Sailor Venus, Reika Nishimura/Rikoukeidar	
1993	Anpanman	Stone Man	
1993	Jungle King Tar-chan	Renhō	
1993	Mobile Suit Victory Gundam	Helen Jackson	
1993	Yaiba	Kaguya	
1993	Tsuyoshi Shikkari Shinasai	Midori	
1995	Wedding Peach	Aquelda	
1996	Case Closed	Mika Taniguchi	
1996	KochiKame: Tokyo Beat Cops	Ayano Jingūji	
1996	Reideen the Superior	Reideen Sayla	
1997	The Kindaichi Case Files	Midori Mimasaka, Fuyuko Tsukishima, Shiho Nishimura	
1998	Kurogane Communication	Angela	
1998	Master Keaton	Mistress	
1999	Bikkuriman 2000	Kaliyuga	
1999	Black Heaven	Hamil	
1999	Crest of the Stars	Spoor	
1999	Legend of Himiko	Kira, Iyo	
1999	Weekly Storyland	Narration	
1999	Zoids: Chaotic Century	Viola, Arabaone's purple mask	
2000	Banner of the Stars	Spoor	
2000	Yu-Gi-Oh! Duel Monsters	Horacti	
2001	Banner of the Stars II	Spoor	
2001	Cosmic Baton Girl Princess Comet	Queen of Planet Castanet	
2001	Go! Go! Itsutsugo Land	Mama	
2001	Ojamajo Doremi	Majo Prima	
2002	Digimon Frontier	Ophanimon, Yuriko Kanbara	
2002	Full Moon o Sagashite	Suzu Imamura	
2002	Naruto	Natsuhi	
2003	Ashita no Nadja	Carmen la Bailaora	
2004	Agatha Christie's Great Detectives Poirot and Marple	Elza Hart	
2004	Futari wa Pretty Cure	Regine	
2004	Galaxy Angel X	Cashier woman	
2005	Blood+	Erizabeta	
2006	Digimon Data Squad	Yggdrasil	
2006	Gintama	Space Woman	
2006	Government Crime Investigation Agent Zaizen Jotaro	Junko Yoshioka	
2006	Jyu-Oh-Sei	Chan	
2006	Katekyo Hitman Reborn!	Nana Sawada	
2008	Golgo 13	Brigitta	
2008	Michiko to Hatchin	Akasha	
2008	Psychic Squad	Kiriko Suma	
2011	Penguindrum	Eriko Oginome	
2012	Btooom!	Shiki Murasaki	
2012	Lupin the Third: The Woman Called Fujiko Mine	True Ailan	
2013	Arata: The Legend	Yorunami's mother	
2021	Fena: Pirate Princess	Grace O'Malley	
2026	Goodbye, Lara	Grace	

=== ONA ===
Year	Work	Role	Source
2023	Lupin the 3rd vs. Cat's Eye	Rui Kisugi	
2024	Monogatari Off & Monster Season	Deathtopia Virtuoso Suicide-Master)	

=== OVA ===
Year	Work	Role	Source
1984	Creamy Mami: Eien no Once More	Prince Tonkari	
1985	Creamy Mami, the Magic Angel: Long Goodbye	reporter	
1985	Magical Princess Minky Momo: La Ronde in My Dream	Stewardess	
1986	Prefectural Earth Defense Force	Akiko Ifukube	
1986	Wounded Man	Misty	
1988	Leina: Wolf Sword Legend	Nami	
1990	Taiman Blues	Mayumi Hashimoto	
1991	Record of Lodoss War	Riara	
1993	Ambassador Magma	Tomoko Murakami, Altemira	
1994	Macross Plus	Myung Fang Lone	
1994	New Cutie Honey	Daiko Hayami	
1994	Ogre Slayer	Setsuko	
1995	Kōryū no Mimi	Sinclair Gordon	
1997	Licca-chan to Yamaneko Hoshi no Tabi	Kaoru's sister	
2003	Kaleido Star: New Wings: Extra Stage	Donna Walker	
2008	Megumi	Sakie Yokota	

=== Animated films ===
- Tobira o Akete (1986) (Kunni)
- Sailor Moon R: The Movie (1993) (Minako Aino/Sailor Venus)
- Sailor Moon S: The Movie (1994) (Minako Aino/Sailor Venus)
- Macross Plus: Movie Edition (1995) (Myung Fang Lone)
- Sailor Moon SuperS: The Movie (1995) (Minako Aino/Sailor Venus)
- Welcome to Lodoss Island! (1998) (Majo Carla)
- Case Closed: Captured in Her Eyes (2000) (Tamaki Jinno)
- Black Jack: The Two Doctors of Darkness (2005) (Gira)
- Appleseed Ex Machina (2007) (Hajime Yoshino)
- City Hunter: Angel Dust (2023) (Rui Kisugi)

=== Video games ===
- Armored Core: Last Raven – Sheila Caldwell
- Assassin's Creed III – Gaji-Jio (Japanese dub)
- Bishōjo Senshi Sailor Moon S – Minako Aino/Sailor Venus
- Boys Over Flowers – Koiseyo Girls – Kaede Domyouji
- Castlevania: Symphony of the Night – Lisa, Succubus
- Dead Island – Puruna Jackson (Japanese dub)
- Final Fantasy XII – Fran
- Harry Potter and the Philosopher's Stone – Hermione Granger (Japanese dub)
- Hitman: Absolution – Diana Byrne Wood (Japanese dub)
- Macross Ace Frontier – Myung Fang Lone
- Mikagura Girl Detective Team – Ranmaru <Randolph Maruyama>, Moriyama Miwa
- Resident Evil: Revelations 2 (Alex Wesker)
- Resident Evil 3 (Alex Wesker)
- Super Robot Wars
- Tactics Ogre: Reborn – Ravness Loxaerion
- Tengai Makyō: Daiyon no Mokushiroku – Jenny Mead

=== Dubbing ===
==== Film ====
- Catherine Zeta-Jones
  - The Phantom (Sala)
  - Entrapment (Virginia "Gin" Baker)
  - Chicago (Velma Kelly)
  - The Terminal (Amelia Warren)
  - Death Defying Acts (Mary McGarvie)
  - No Reservations (Kate Armstrong)
  - The Rebound (Sandy)
  - Broken City (Cathleen Hostetler)
  - Red 2 (Katya Petrokovich)
  - Side Effects (Dr. Victoria Siebert)
  - Wednesday (Morticia Addams)
- Angelina Jolie
  - Playing by Heart (Joan)
  - Gone in 60 Seconds (Sara "Sway" Wayland)
  - Original Sin (Julia Russell/Bonny Castle)
  - Lara Croft: Tomb Raider (Lara Croft)
  - Lara Croft Tomb Raider: The Cradle of Life (Lara Croft)
  - Mr. & Mrs. Smith (2010 TV Asahi edition) (Jane Smith)
  - Beowulf (Grendel's Mother)
  - Maleficent (Maleficent)
  - Maleficent: Mistress of Evil (Maleficent)
  - Eternals (Thena)
- Sharon Stone
  - Sliver (Carly Norris)
  - Gloria (Gloria)
  - The Muse (Sarah Little)
  - Simpatico (Rosie Carter)
  - If These Walls Could Talk 2 (Fran)
  - Searching for Debra Winger (Sharon Stone)
  - Catwoman (Laurel Hedare)
  - Border Run (Sofie)
- Julia Roberts
  - Pretty Woman (Vivian Ward)
  - Notting Hill (Anna Scott)
  - Mona Lisa Smile (Katherine Ann Watson)
  - Mirror Mirror (Queen Clementianna)
  - Money Monster (Patty Fenn)
  - Wonder (Isabel Minel Pullman)
  - Ticket to Paradise (Georgia Cotton)
- Sandra Bullock
  - The Thing Called Love (Linda Lue Linden)
  - Miss Congeniality 2: Armed and Fabulous (Gracie Hart)
  - All About Steve (Mary Horowitz)
  - Gravity (Dr. Ryan Stone)
  - Our Brand Is Crisis ('Calamity' Jane Bodine)
- Halle Berry
  - Boomerang – Angela Lewis
  - Executive Decision – Jean
  - X-Men – Ororo Munroe / Storm
  - X2 – Ororo Munroe / Storm
  - X-Men: The Last Stand – Ororo Munroe / Storm
- Julianne Moore
  - Far from Heaven (Cathy Whitaker)
  - Children of Men (Julian Taylor)
  - Chloe (Dr. Catherine Stewart)
  - Seventh Son (Mother Malkin)
- Famke Janssen
  - Hide and Seek (Dr. Katherine Carson)
  - Taken (Lenore Mills)
  - Taken 2 (Lenore Mills)
  - Taken 3 (Lenore Mills)
- Jodie Foster
  - The Accused (Sarah Tobias)
  - Maverick (Annabelle Bransford)
  - Panic Room (Meg Altman)
  - Carnage (Penelope Longstreet)
- Anna Magdalena – Assistant Editor (Anita Yuen)
- Any Given Sunday – Christina Pagniacci (Cameron Diaz)
- Ashfall – Jeon Yoo-kyung – (Jeon Hye-jin)
- The Bank Job – Martine Love (Saffron Burrows)
- Basquiat – Gina Cardinale (Claire Forlani)
- Batman Forever – Dr. Chase Meridian (Nicole Kidman)
- Black Rain – Joyce (Kate Capshaw)
- Blade Runner 2049 – Lt. Joshi (Robin Wright)
- Collateral Damage – Selena Perrini (Francesca Neri)
- Color of Night – Rose/Richie/Bonnie (Jane March)
- Coming 2 America – Queen Lisa Joffer (Shari Headley)
- Confessions of a Shopaholic – Jane Bloomwood (Joan Cusack)
- Courage Under Fire – Captain Karen Emma Walden (Meg Ryan)
- Coyote Ugly – Lil Lovell (Maria Bello)
- The Crow (1997 TV Tokyo edition) – Sarah Mohr (Rochelle Davis)
- Dark Shadows – Angelique Bouchard Collins (Eva Green)
- Date Night – Claire Foster (Tina Fey)
- Deep Blue Sea – Dr. Susan McAlester (Saffron Burrows)
- Desperate Measures – Dr. Samantha Hawkins (Marcia Gay Harden)
- Disturbia – Julie Brecht (Carrie-Anne Moss)
- DOA: Dead or Alive – Christie (Holly Valance)
- Double Jeopardy – Elizabeth "Libby" Parsons (Ashley Judd)
- Down with Love – Vikki Hiller (Sarah Paulson)
- Dragon: The Bruce Lee Story – Linda Lee (Lauren Holly)
- Ed (Lydia (Jayne Brook))
- The Fabulous Baker Boys – Susie Diamond (Michelle Pfeiffer)
- Fantastic Beasts and Where to Find Them – Seraphina Picquery (Carmen Ejogo)
- Fear and Loathing in Las Vegas – The Waitress at North Star Cafe (Ellen Barkin))
- The Firm – Abby McDeere (Jeanne Tripplehorn)
- Four Rooms – Elspeth (Madonna)
- Friday the 13th Part VIII: Jason Takes Manhattan – Rennie Wickham (Jensen Daggett)
- G.I. Jane – Lieutenant Jordan O'Neil (Demi Moore)
- Halifax: Retribution – Jane Halifax (Rebecca Gibney)
- Hanna – Marissa Wiegler (Cate Blanchett)
- Heart and Souls – Penny Washington (Alfre Woodard)
- Heat (1998 TV Asahi edition) – Charlene Shiherlis (Ashley Judd)
- House of Cards – Claire Underwood (Robin Wright)
- Inferno – Elizabeth Sinskey (Sidse Babett Knudsen)
- The Interpreter – Dot Woods (Catherine Keener)
- The Jacket – Dr. Beth Lorenson (Jennifer Jason Leigh)
- Jet Lag – Rose (Juliette Binoche)
- Last Christmas – Huang Qing Shin / 'Santa' (Michelle Yeoh)
- A League of Their Own – "All the Way" Mae Mordabito (Madonna)
- Lilo & Stitch – Grand Councilwoman (Hannah Waddingham)
- The Lover – The Young Girl (Jane March)
- Marley & Me – Jenny Grogan (Jennifer Aniston)
- Martin (2018 Blu-ray edition) – Abbie Santini (Elyane Nadeau)
- The Matrix Reloaded – Niobe (Jada Pinkett Smith)
- The Matrix Revolutions – Niobe (Jada Pinkett Smith)
- Mean Girls – Ms. Sharon Norbury (Tina Fey)
- Mindhunters – Sara Moore (Kathryn Morris)
- The Missing – Magdalena "Maggie" Gilkeson (Cate Blanchett)
- Mothers and Daughters– Beth (Courteney Cox)
- Mr. Brooks – Detective Tracy Atwood (Demi Moore)
- Nightcrawler – Nina Romina (Rene Russo)
- Notorious – Faith Evans (Antonique Smith)
- Office Christmas Party – Carol Vanstone (Jennifer Aniston)
- Out of Sight – Karen Sisco (Jennifer Lopez)
- Pecker – Tina (Martha Plimpton)
- The Perfect Storm – Christina "Chris" Cotter (Diane Lane)
- The Pianist – Janina Bogucki (Ruth Platt)
- Prometheus – Meredith Vickers (Charlize Theron)
- Punch-Drunk Love – Lena Leonard (Emily Watson)
- Rampage – Claire Wyden (Malin Åkerman)
- Sabotage (Investigator Caroline Brentwood (Olivia Williams))
- The Santa Clause 3: The Escape Clause – Mrs. Claus/Carol Calvin (Elizabeth Mitchell)
- Scarface (1991 TV Tokyo edition) – Gina (Mary Elizabeth Mastrantonio)
- Single White Female – Allison "Allie" Jones (Bridget Fonda)
- Six Days, Seven Nights – Robin Monroe (Anne Heche)
- Someone Like You – Jane Goodale (Ashley Judd)
- A Sound of Thunder – Sonia Rand (Catherine McCormack)
- Spy Game – Elizabeth Hadley (Catherine McCormack)
- Stardust – Lamia (Michelle Pfeiffer)
- Sucker Punch – Dr. Vera Gorski / Madame Vera Gorski (Carla Gugino)
- The Ten Commandments (2002 TV Asahi edition) Nefretiri (Anne Baxter)
- This Means War – Trish (Chelsea Handler)
- Triple 9 – Irina Vlaslov (Kate Winslet)
- Turbulence – Teri Halloran (Lauren Holly)
- Unlocked – Emily Knowles (Toni Collette)
- Unthinkable – Agent Helen Brody (Carrie-Anne Moss)
- Up in the Air – Alexandra 'Alex' Goran (Vera Farmiga)
- The Vanishing – Rita Baker (Nancy Travis)
- Village of the Damned (1998 TV Asahi edition) – Barbara (Karen Kahn)
- Waterworld – Helen (Jeanne Tripplehorn)
- The Way, Way Back – Pam (Toni Collette)
- Wayne's World – Cassandra Wong (Tia Carrere)
- Wayne's World 2 – Cassandra Wong (Tia Carrere)
- What Women Want – Darcy McGuire (Helen Hunt)
- Wild Wild West (2002 NTV edition) – Miss Mae Lee East (Bai Ling)
- Wonder Woman – Antiope (Robin Wright)
- Wonder Woman 1984 – Antiope (Robin Wright)
- XXX: State of the Union – Lola Jackson (Nona Gaye)
- The Yellow Handkerchief – May (Maria Bello)
- Yesterday – Debra Hammer (Kate McKinnon)
- Zhong Kui: Snow Girl and the Dark Crystal – Snow Girl (Li Bingbing)

==== Television ====
- Battlestar Galactica (2006 series, season 4) – Helena Cain (Michelle Forbes)
- Beyond the Break – Elizabeth
- Burn Notice – Detective Paxson (Moon Bloodgood)
- Californication – Karen (Natascha McElhone)
- Chase – Annie Frost (Kelli Giddish)
- Criminal Minds – Emily Prentiss (Paget Brewster)
- CSI: New York (season 4) – Rene
- Dirt – Lucy Spiller (Courteney Cox)
- Eureka – Allison Blake (Salli Richardson)
- Friends – Monica Geller (Courteney Cox)
- Lost – Daniel
- The Mentalist (season 4) – Santori (Heather Mazur)
- No Limit – Alexandra (Hélène Seuzaret)
- Once Upon a Time – Regina (Lana Parrilla)
- One Tree Hill – Sheryl Crow
- ReGenesis – Jill Langston (Sarah Strange)
- Road to Avonlea – Olivia Dale (Mag Ruffman)
- Satisfaction – Mel
- Supernatural (season 2) – Molly (Tricia Helfer)
- The Unit (season 3) – Heather (Kim Thomson)

==== Animation ====
- Captain Planet and the Planeteers (Linka)
- Chicken Little (Foxy Loxy)
- How to Train Your Dragon 2 (Valka)
- How to Train Your Dragon: The Hidden World (Valka)
- Guillermo del Toro's Pinocchio (Wood Sprite/Death)
- PB&J Otter (Opal)
- Raya and the Last Dragon (Virana)
- The Simpsons (Kim Basinger)

== Discography ==
=== Singles ===
Title	Year	Details	Peak chart positions		Sales	Ref.
Title	Year	Details	JPN	JPN Comb.	Sales	Ref.
"Setsunakute ī" (せつなくていい)	1994	Released: March 1, 1994; Label: Nippon Columbia	—	—	—	
"24 Crush" (stylized as 24☆Crush)	1995	Released: June 21, 1995; Label: Apollon	—	—	—	
"Prologue" (プロローグ)	1996	Released: December 21, 1996; Label: Nippon Columbia	—	—	—	

=== Albums ===
Title	Year	Details	Peak chart positions		Sales	Ref.
Title	Year	Details	JPN	JPN Comb.	Sales	Ref.
Hoshizora no Fugue (星空のフーガ)	1993	Released: October 21, 1993; Label: Nippon Columbia	—	—	—	
Mornin'After	1994	Released: February 21, 1994; Label: Apollon	—	—	—	
La Venus	1994	Released: September 21, 1994; Label: Apollon	—	—	—	
Yo ni mo Suteki na Monogatari: Mystery Train ni Notte (世にも素敵な物語～ミステリートレインに乗って～)	1995	Released: November 21, 1995; Label: Apollon	—	—	—	
Mabushī Kisetsu ni Koi o Shite (まぶしい季節に恋をして)	1996	Released: March 21, 1996; Label: Tri-M	—	—	—	

== Awards ==
Year	Award ceremony	Award	Result
2020	14th Seiyu Awards	Kazue Takahashi Memorial Award	Won
