= Ninja Senshi Tobikage =

Japanese anime series

- North American Blu-Ray cover
- Also known as: Ninja Robots
- 忍者戦士飛影
- Genre: Mecha
- Created by: Yūji Watanabe
- Written by: Yūji Watanabe
- Directed by: Masami Annō
- Music by: Eiji Kawamura
- Country of origin: Japan
- Original language: Japanese
- No. of episodes: 43

Production
- Executive producer: Yuji Nunokawa
- Producers: Norio Hatsukawa (NTV); Masaaki Fusekawa (Studio Pierrot); Yoshitaki Suzuki (Studio Pierrot)
- Production company: Studio Pierrot

Original release
- Network: NNS (NTV)
- Release: 6 October 1985 – 13 July 1986

Ninja Robots, known in Japan as Ninja Robot Tobikage (忍者戦士飛影, Ninja Senshi Tobikage; lit. Tobikage the Ninja Soldier), is a Japanese anime television series, produced by Pierrot, which aired from 6 October 1985 to 13 July 1986 on Nippon Television. It was also broadcast in English language in Australia and Anglophone Asia on Cartoon Network, but never aired in the United States, Canada and the United Kingdom.

== Plot ==
It is the 23rd century and Earth have colonized Mars and the Moon. Much like the legendary convicts in Australia during the 18th and 19th century, the settlers of Mars consist mostly of convicts from Earth. The Martian colony is run by a dictatorial Commander Hazzard Pascha, who tests every settler on whether they should serve in the military or become a laborer.

Joe Maya is a 16-year-old who lives on Mars and dreams of returning to Earth. He has two friends: Mike Coil and Jenny Ai. When escaping from the Martian military police, Joe and Mike stumble upon a crashed spaceship, the Xenos 5, being attacked by huge robots. In his attempt to escape chasing robots, Joe gets into the spaceship where he encounters three human-looking aliens: the beautiful Princess Rowena, her willowy attendant Jade, and a young General Icelander. A robot locates them and the three aliens hide, leaving Joe to fend for himself. Joe tries hiding in a pile of glowing metal, which turns out to be a ninja robot named Black Lion. The battle leads outside the ship where a mysterious ninja robot Cybertron suddenly appears when the Black Lion struggles. It wipes out several enemy robots before merging with Joe's robot, transforming into a mechanical lion that destroys the remaining attackers.

After the attack, Joe, Mike, and Jenny are forcibly taken to the alien spaceship. It transpires that the aliens are from the planet Ladorio (also romanized as "Radorio") in a distant galaxy (Andromeda, also "Black Star Galaxy" in the English version), and are at war with the Zaboom army who captured their planet. They came to the Milky Way seeking ninjas who could operate their three ninja robots. Joe, Mike, and Jenny agree to help them for a variety of reasons. Along the way, as they fend off the constant attacks by the Zaboom army and their allies, they make new friends and enemies, while Cybertron looms mysteriously in the background.

== Characters ==
=== Humans ===
Joe Maya (ジョウ・マヤ, Jō Maya), Voiced by: Kazuhiko Inoue
Joe is a 16-year-old boy who lives with his father (a construction worker) on Mars at the beginning of the series. He lost his mother when he was young, but often reminisces about the beauty of Earth. He is rebellious (especially against authority), quick-tempered, insensitive, and impulsive, the opposite of his father, who is calm and thoughtful. His nonattendance at the compulsory military exam leads to him and Mike being chased by the military police into the area where the spaceship crash lands.
At first, Joe attempts to leave his friends to go after Hazzard, but they support him when Hazzard imprisons his father and Jenny's parents. He is the first to discover and operate one of the three ninja robots: the Black Lion. He is usually the first to spring towards defending Xenos 5 during the numerous attacks. Cybertron appears when he is in a dire situation and either aids him or merges with the Black Lion. He eventually pilots Cybertron. He is often singled out by Icelander (piloting Mantis or Zerokage) for duels. His motivation for helping Xenos 5 changes as the series progresses: rebel against Hazzard, rescue the parents, inform Earth of Hazzard's evil plans, find the ninjas, and free Ladorio from the Zaboom army. His tactics are very daring, such as infiltrating C-Terahertz as a prisoner.
Joe's childhood friend is Ronin and their friendship stands several tests. He and Mike are close, referring to each other as brothers. He enjoys teasing Jenny and treats her like one of the guys, but becomes jealous when he wrongly suspects Mike of fancying her. He is struck by the beauty of Princess Rowena upon their first meeting and is willing to do anything to protect her. He continues being attracted to both Jenny and Rowena and admits this to Jenny in the final episode (the English version strongly hints that he reciprocates Jenny's love and confesses his love to her in episode 41). (Note: The Japanese version has no resolution for the love triangle among Joe, Jenny, and the Princess.) His infatuation with the princess, as well as his rude and rash behavior, puts him at odds with Icelander . This results in an animosity that persists until the very end – when Joe encourages him to fight against dying and they join hands to power Xenos 5.
Jenny Ai (レニー・アイ, Renī Ai; known as Lennie Ai in Japan), Voiced by: Noriko Hidaka
Jenny is a 16-year-old girl (turns 17 during the series) who is friends with Joe and Mike. She is a no-nonsense girl-next-door, determined, stubborn, but also caring about her family who faces Hazzard's machinations. She is the second of the group to operate a ninja robot; she pilots the Phoenix Thunderhawk. She is almost as daring as Joe in combat and comes to his rescue several times.
A local boy, Kenji, has a crush on her, but she does not reciprocate, and gets irritated whenever Joe teases her about him. She is passionately in love with Joe and is very jealous and possessive, becoming upset and hurt by Joe's continued insensitivity to her feelings and occasional flirting with Princess Rowena. She reacts violently whenever she observes signs of Princess Rowena's increasing love for Joe. The two girls reach a truce when Rowena admits loving Joe, but requests her for a united front until Ladorio is freed. Although Jenny does not like going to Ladorio (fearing she may lose Joe to Rowena), she changes her mind when Joe confesses his love for her. Jenny is also close to Mike, giving him advice on courting Jade.
Mike Coil (マイク・コイル, Maiku Koiru), Voiced by: Masami Kikuchi
Mike is a 15-year-old boy who treats Joe like an older brother, although he is the opposite in personality, being sensitive, perceptive, and reserved. He is protective of Joe, leaping to his defense when Icelander or Gameran criticizes or are skeptical of Joe. He completes the initial trio who pilot the Ninja Robots; he pilots Burst Dragon.
He eventually falls in love with Jade and gets contrasting love advice from both Joe and Jenny. He is critical of Joe's treatment of Jenny, sometimes even physically fighting.
Damian (ダミアン, Damian), Voiced by: Masamichi Satō
Damian is the 18-year-old son of the Martian north pole's guerrilla leader. He initially mistrusts Joe and the Ladorians, but later joins them when Hazzard attacks both Xenos 5 and the North Pole. After Joe pilots Cybertron, Damian works hard and succeeds in piloting the Black Lion.
His microchip on the ninjas provides them with information on the mechanism of Cybertron strengthening the ninja robots. He falls in love with a female ninja (led by Charme and sent to trap Xenos 5), but she sacrifices her life to enable them escape.
Ronin Sanada (ローニン・サナダ, Rōnin Sanada), Voiced by: Masashi Hironaka
Ronin is a childhood friend of Joe, Mike, and Jenny, and is a Major General in Earth. He was very close to Joe when he lived in Mars with his father. He trusts his childhood friends despite the convincing lies told by Hazzard and unwaveringly tries to help them and Xenos 5 by using his father's power and connections, often at great risks to himself. He is arrested when Hazzard frames him and is forced to attack Xenos 5 and Joe. He is daring and provides fuel for Xenos 5, an act for which he is dismissed. He is reinstated when the Earth Federation decides to support Xenos 5. He discovers Xenos 5's previous visit to Japan in A.D. 1790.
Kegare Sanada (ケガレ・サナダ, Kegare Sanada), Voiced by: Rokurō Naya
Kegare is the father of Ronin. He is the North American representative to the Earth Federation and was the previous commander of the Martian colony. He, along with his son, tries to lobby support for Xenos 5. When the Earth Federation allies with Hazzard (and the Zaboom army), he withdraws North America's membership of the Earth Federation and offers assistance to Xenos 5. He is later forced to rejoin the Earth Federation and become hostile to Xenos 5.
Hazzard Pascha (ハザード・パシャ, Hazādo Pasha), Voiced by: Takeshi Aono
Hazzard is the 40-year-old dictatorial commander of Mars who persecutes the polar guerrillas and imposes his will on the inhabitants. He is power-hungry, opportunistic, devious, a liar, and a master manipulator. He waits for an opportunity to take revenge on earth for transferring him to Mars. The crash-landing of Xenos 5 makes him realizes that he could use the technology to conquer earth. All of his future actions are motivated by this purpose. He kidnaps Princess Rowena for coercing her into giving him the technology. Upon her refusal, he allies with Grathan, the first deal being to receive the enemy robots in exchange for Rowena. The fine-print of his alliance with the Zaboom army varies during the course of the series, but through this he increases his arsenal of enemy robots and hopes to conquer the solar system using these and the ninja robots.
He fears King Annex, is angry at Grathan for his occasional disregard, and deeply hates Icelander for mainly three reasons (beating him in the race to succeed Grathan, his arrogant behavior, and for seeing through his machinations). In the finale, he rescues Joe and Icelander (and their robots- Cybertron and Zerokage) after the destruction of the Zaboom fortress and plans to use them to conquer the universe. He places bombs on both robots to ensure their destruction if they disobey. When Joe and Icelander escape to duel outside Xenos 5, Hazzard triggers the bombs upon realizing that they are fueled by hatred towards each other and would only be counterproductive to his plans. He tries to kill everyone on Xenos 5, but is destroyed by the Phoenix in Houraiou mode.
Dog Tack (ドッグ・タック, Doggu Takku), Voiced by: Takashi Taniguchi
Dog Tack is Hazzard's henchman and trusted aide. He is eventually killed in episode 41.

=== Ladorio ===
This is a list of the notable characters from the planet Ladorio.

Rowena Ladorio (ロミナ・ラドリオ, Romina Radorio; known as Romina Ladorio in Japan), Voiced by: Sumi Shimamoto
Rowena is the young daughter and heiress of King Ladorio VII of Ladorio. When the Zaboom army invades Ladorio, her parents entrust her with the task of finding the ninjas from the Earth who could pilot the three ninja robots and defeat the invaders. She strongly believes that Joe and his friends are the ninjas despite their denials. Unlike others on Xenos 5, she readily accepts Joe and his friends, considers their advice, and is distressed by fights and arguments between Joe and Icelander or Gameran. Although she puts on a brave and composed front, she mourns over the destruction of her home planet, her father's assassination, and her mother's imprisonment. This also makes her sensitive to the lives of humans, often vetoing plans by Icelander and/or Gameran that involves such collateral destruction and loss.
She has a strong sense of ethics and is both diplomatic and decisive. She is courageous, attacking Icelander (in Mantis or Zerokage) when he overpowered Joe (in the Black Lion or Cybertron) and throwing herself under the two robots to prevent them from fighting. Although she is perturbed by Grathan and Annex, she refuses to waver from her mission of finding the ninjas and redeeming her home planet, even if she is the last one standing. This single-minded focus leads her to rebuff Icelander's attempt at courting her (giving him a lecture on their priorities) and postpones acting on her growing love for Joe. She is also rational, explaining to Jenny that she would compete for Joe only if her feelings are unchanged after accomplishing her mission. In the finale, she seems to give up on winning Joe when she sees him with Jenny.
Her attitude towards Joe results in Icelander concluding he cannot win her heart, thus defecting to C-Terahertz and flaming his hatred of Joe. This action devastates her and, regardless of his reasons (which Gameran was commanded to divulge), she considers him a betrayer and enemy. Yet, she is forgiving and does not prevent several of her frightened crew from defecting (in fact, she forgives Gameran's attempts at defecting; presumably Icelander is forgiven in the finale).
Jade (シャフ, Shafu; known as Schaffe in Japan), Voiced by: Rika Fukami
Jade is an 18-year-old lady-in-waiting and confidante of Princess Rowena. She is conscientious, kind, and understanding, often protesting on behalf of the Princess who does not vocalize her feelings. She was skeptical of Joe being a ninja owing to his brash character. She is very protective of Rowena and threatens Joe against capturing Rowena's heart for this is a guaranteed heartbreak (Rowena can marry only a Ladorian). She is cautious, not divulging Icelander's attempt at killing Rowena as she does not know his reasons. She does not tolerate bad behavior and scolds others for being insensitive and Joe for his treatment of Jenny. She is courageous, impersonating Rowena when visiting the Earth Federation and earns the admiration and love of Mike.
Icelander (イルボラ・サロ, Irubora Saro; known as Irbora Saro in Japan), Voiced by: Kenyu Horiuchi
Icelander is a reserved, but very ambitious general who commands Xenos 5 (later, C-Terahertz for King Annex). Known as "The Best Warrior" and "Pride" of Ladorio, he identifies himself as a soldier and is proud and arrogant, tending to look down upon others. He is both an excellent warrior and military tactician, often divining his opponents' game-plans, capitalizing on the context, and giving little thought to collateral damage. Throughout the series, he is driven by his deep love for Princess Rowena, his dream of rebuilding Ladorio with her, and his great hatred and envy of Joe. He pilots the Mantis and the ninja robot Zerokage.
Both he and Joe are "people of action" and this mutual antipathy ends up in open quarrels and fights. He does not accept Joe and his friends and hates him for disagreeing on his tactics, disobeying him, and attracting Rowena. The need to win her love and trust makes him reckless and he is captured by Grathan and Hazzard who offer a tempting deal, lies of Ladorio's destruction, and pokes at his feelings (better to kill her rather than lose her to Joe). Although his love for her prevents him from killing her, he feels guilty for breaking his promise to protect her and leaves Xenos 5.
He becomes a mercenary, fighting for Grathan and King Annex and targeting Joe for duels. His loyalty to Annex is suspect, harboring plans of single-handedly freeing Ladorio. He negotiates with Grathan for Rowena's survival and expects her to understand his feelings when he saves her. Prior to a plan of destroying Xenos 5, he infiltrates the spaceship and warns Gameran, begging him to move Rowena to safety. He finally gloats to Joe about the sole reason for working for Annex: the opportunity to destroy him. This hatred for Joe persists until he is seriously injured. Expecting to die, he confesses his feelings to Rowena and entrusts her to Joe. He is believed to have survived as Zerokage/him and Cybertron/Joe join hands and enter the secret room together to power the Xenos 5, thus fulfilling the prophecy.
Gameran (ガメラン, Gameran; known as Gamellun in Japan), Voiced by: Masashi Sugawara
Gameran is the second in command aboard the Xenos 5. He deeply distrusts Joe and his friends and their efforts to help Xenos 5, often assuming that they are betraying them or are using them. He takes the initiative to attempt at murdering Joe and Jenny and often tries to prevent Joe from leaving the ship- whether it be for fighting against the enemies or negotiating. He is the only person to whom Icelander confesses his reasons for leaving Xenos 5. He remains more loyal to Icelander who prevents his attempts at following him to C-Terahertz and commissions him with protecting Princess Rowena. This makes him angrier at Joe and his friends, seeing them as the reasons for Icelander's departure.

=== Zaboom ===
A list of notable characters in the army of Zaboom.

Grathan Gryn (グラサン・グリン, Gurasan Gurin), Voiced by: Hōchū Ōtsuka
Grathan Gryn is the first commander of the Zaboom army who pursues Xenos 5 to the Solar System. His mission shifts from capturing Xenos 5 to killing Princess Rowena and reluctantly allies with Hazzard. He is manipulative, but is also manipulated by Hazzard. The duo traps Icelander and offers him a deal: the three ninja robots in exchange for murdering the Princess. His lies and manipulations contribute to Icelander abandoning Xenos 5 and joining C-Terahertz. Grathan later agrees (with the fullest intention of reneging) to a revised deal with Icelander: the capture of Xenos 5 in exchange for the survival of Princess Rowena. When Rowena attacks Mantis/Icelander, Grathan shoots at her plane, even shooting down Mantis/Icelander when he obstructs and protests. He is killed by Cybertron just as he is about to kill Rowena.
Charme Veker (シャルム・ベーカー, Sharumu Bēkā), Voiced by: Eiko Yamada
King Annex's trusted and devoted General (with her own female warriors) and possible lover. She is beautiful, but stern, cruel, ruthless, and devious. She is struck by the beauty of the planet Earth, which Annex promises to give her. She is suspicious of Icelander and believes he has hidden motives. This leads her to disregard Icelander's tactical advice and tries to kill him (and Cybertron) in the force room. She is killed in the destruction of G-Excellent.
King Annex (アネックス・ザブーム, Anekkusu Zabūmu; known as Anecs Zaboom in Japan), Voiced by: Masaaki Okabe
King Annex is the ruler of planet Zaboom and seeks to become the ruler of the universe. He possesses a large fleet of spaceships and robots. He invades Ladorio under the pretext of punishing King Ladorio VII for disagreeing with his viewpoint on the population decline in the galaxy. The more compelling reason is the legend and prophecy on the ninjas. He goes on to conquer the galaxy and focuses on achieving absolute victory: killing Princess Rowena and appropriating the three ninja robots. He comes to the solar system due to Grathan's consistent failures at both tasks. He appoints Icelander as Grathan's successor and correctly guesses Icelander to be the destined pilot of another ninja robot that he possesses, the Zerokage. Upon understanding that ninjas have died out, his aim shifts to securing the other part of the prophecy from Rowena and using Cybertron to conquer the universe. He supposedly leaves for Zaboom in C-Terahertz, leaving Charme in charge, but hides in the vicinity of G-Excellent. He is killed when Joe destroys the G-Excellent.

== Machines ==
=== Ninja Legend and Prophecy ===
The ancient legend, pieced together during the series, speaks of mysterious ninjas who, 500 years ago, fought off an invading Zaboom army trying to conquer Ladorio. They had been transported from Japan in A.D.1790 and brought to planet via Xenos 5. Subsequently, they were the models for the three ninja robots (Black Lion, Phoenix Thunderhawk, and Burst Dragon) and it was believed the robots could be piloted only by the ninjas.

When the Zaboom army attacks Ladorio, King Ladorio VII entrusts Princess Rowena with the task of finding the ninjas from Earth who could pilot the three robots and defeat the Zaboom army. King Annex aims at not only preventing Rowena from finding the ninjas, but also use the ninjas and the ninja robots to conquer the universe.

Both Annex and Rowena possess a torn piece each of a parchment containing the prophecy. Annex's parchment, with the latter half of the prophecy, states that the ninjas in Xenos 5 would emit a great light and would have the power to destroy stars and planets. Rowena's parchment (hidden in her tiara and discovered in the final episode), with the former half of the prophecy, states that when Cybertron and Zerokage meet at Xenos 5, they will combine to generate great energy, resulting in the transformation of Xenos 5.

The prophecy is fulfilled when Icelander and Joe join hands to merge into Cybertron and Zerokage, emitting the great light, and enter the secret, forbidden chamber in Xenos 5 where they power and transform Xenos 5 and journeys back to Ladorio.

=== Ninja Robots ===
The ninja robots are mechas that can be controlled only by individuals with special abilities. In the event of the pilots losing their physical strength, they merge with a special ninja robot called Cybertron (Tobikage) and transform into a more powerful combination.

The pilots of both Cybertron (Joe) and Zerokage (Icelander) have a deeper association with their ninja robots. The robots instinctively respond to them and merges with them when their lives are in danger (as seen when Joe and Icelander are in their mortal forms when G-Excellent is destroyed, but are found by Hazzard drifting in space in their robot forms). They also have reciprocal power levels. They combine to form a luminous power source that not only energizes Xenos 5, but also has the potential to destroy stars (and their previous inadvertent combination contributes to a widespread damage of G-Excellent).

Cybertron (飛影, Tobikage; lit. Flying Shadow)
Cybertron is a small ninja robot, approximately 3.6 m (12 ft) tall and weighing 500 kg (1,100 lb). It mysteriously appears whenever the ninja robots are low on power or are facing overwhelming odds. It can fight on its own or can combine with one of the ninja robots (when the pilots are weak) to form a more powerful mode. From episode 26 onwards, Joe is able to summon and pilot Cybertron. Icelander tracks the origin of Cybertron to the secret chamber aboard the Xenos 5.
Black Lion (黒獅子, Kurojishi)
Black Lion was the first ninja robot to be activated. It is initially piloted by Joe and later by Damian. When it merges with Cybertron, it is known as "Beast Demon Kurojishi", and looks more like a lion. As per its namesake, it has an armored mane that shoots bullets and is the most agile and speedy of the ninja robots. It is 6.5 m (21 ft) tall and weighs 10 tons.
Phoenix Thunderhawk (鳳雷鷹, Hōraiō)
Phoenix Thunderhawk is the ninja robot used by Jenny. It has powers of fire. When it merges with Cybertron, it is known as "Sky Demon Hōraiō", and resembles a fiery phoenix. In this form, it can fly and cast a flame that spans its wings. It is 7.2 m (24 ft) tall and weighs 9.6 tons.
Burst Dragon (爆竜, Bakuryū)
Burst Dragon is the ninja robot used by Mike. When it merges with Cybertron, it is known as "Sea Demon Bakuryu", and resembles a dragon. Its form is large and strong, but slow and ungainly. Its special ability is a lightning strike that is capable of wiping out entire robot armies. It is 8.3 m (27 ft) tall and weighs 12 tons.

=== Zaboom Robots ===
Shadow Bots (シャーマン, Shāman; known as Shaman in Japan)
The generic battle mecha used by the Zaboom army. They are colored red, have camouflaging abilities, and are equipped with kamas. They are 3.6 m (12 ft) tall and weigh 750 kg (1,650 lb).
Stealth Destroyers (バンクス, Bankusu; known as Bankz in Japan)
A more powerful mecha used by the Zaboom army. They are equipped jumonji type yari and are significantly larger than the Shadow Bots at 10 m (33 ft) tall.
Mantis (スケルトン, Sukeruton; known as Skeleton in Japan)
A giant, blue robot created by Grathan and having four times the strength of the Stealth Destroyers. As part of a deal with Grathan, Icelander is allowed to pilot this (from episode 19 until episode 24) and lead the Zaboom attacks on Xenos 5. It was destroyed by the Black Lion in Kurojishi mode.
Zerokage (零影; lit. Null Shadow)
Zerokage is a very agile and sentient Ninja Robot possessed by King Annex. Given its reference in the prophecy, it is not known how Annex got it. It merges with Icelander when Icelander was thrown out of the Mantis. Its main opponent is the Cybertron and both robots are comparable in ability. It is 4 m (13 ft) tall and weighs 550 kg (1,210 lb).

=== Fortresses ===
Xenos 5 (エルシャンク, Erushanku; known as Ellshanc in Japan)
Also: Cinos 5. The mother ship for the aliens from Ladorio. It is 300 m long and 250 m wide. It carries a crew of 50 people, both male and female. Xenos 5 had visited the earth 500 years ago to carry away several ninja warriors to Ladorio.
C-Terahertz (C・テラヘルツ, Shi Teraherutsu)
A giant space fortress used by the Zaboom army and Commander Grathan when pursuing Xenos 5. It is 500 m tall and is later commanded by Icelander. The Black Lion in Kurojishi mode cripples it (temporarily) to permit Xenos 5 to reach the Earth.
G-Excellent (G・エクセレント, Ji Ekuserento)
King Annex reaches the solar system in this gigantic space fortress commanded by Charme. C-Terahertz is a dwarf when compared to this. It is first damaged by the Earth's missiles and later crippled by Icelander/Zerokage's attack on Joe / Cybertron. It is finally destroyed by Joe's time bombs.
Famille Ship
A cruiser used by Hazzard. It is destroyed in the 41st episode by the Phoenix in Houraioh mode.

== Media ==
=== Anime ===
The anime series was produced by Studio Pierrot, and aired on Nippon Television network from 6 October 1985 to 13 July 1986 with 43 episodes. The initial plan was to finish the series with the recapture of the planet Ladorio, but financial difficulties stopped the show with the plot ending at Xenos 5 leaving for Ladorio.

It was also broadcast across to South Asia, Southeast Asia and Australia (including Bangladesh, Pakistan, India and Malaysia) by Cartoon Network in English. It was also dubbed across Russia by Ren-TV, across Ukraine by Pershyi Natsionalnyi, across the Philippines by Solar USA after Cartoon Network Philippines removed it from it airwaves, and across France by TF1, under the title Tobikage. A Latin American Spanish version was produced under the title Robots Ninja, and was broadcast across Chile by TVN de Chile, Mexico by Televisa Canal 5 and Peru by América Televisión 4.

In 1995, it was dubbed & under the title Ninja Robots. The series was written, produced, and directed by Buz Alexander of Alexander Entertainment Group. The English cast credited Los Angeles-based voice actors Cam Clarke, Steve Kramer, Wendee Lee, Mike Reynolds, and Doug Stone for providing voices, however the actual voices were done by Miami-based actors at Sonic III Studios. It is rumored that a test pilot with done with those voice actors before the Miami cast was brought in. The first eleven episodes of this version do not follow the original order of episodes.

The opening theme song is titled "Love Survivor" (LOVEサバイバー, LOVE Sabaibā?). The closing theme song is titled "Ichi Seikime no Angel" (一世紀めのエンジェル, Ichi Seikime no Enjeru?). Both songs were written by Kumiko Aoki, and the composition and arrangements were done by Yūichirō Oda. The songs were sung by HIT BOY.

In the English adaptation, the opening theme song is used for both the opener and closer; the lyrics were written by Lisa McBride and the song was performed and arranged by Jerry Cobb. For the Latin American Spanish version of the show, the theme song, based on the English version, was performed by Ricardo Silva.

==== Episode list ====
No.	Title	Written by	Original release date
1	"The Opened Door" (開かれた扉)	Yuji Watanabe	6 October 1985
2	"Encounters with the Unknown" (未知との出会い)	Sukehiro Tomita	13 October 1985
3	"The Wounded Princess" (傷だらけの姫君)	Hideki Sonoda	20 October 1985
4	"The Legendary Ninja" (伝説の忍者)	Yuji Watanabe	27 October 1985
5	"The Polar Cap – A New Trial" (極冠新たなる試練)	Hideo Takayashiki	3 November 1985
6	"Blizzard of Battle" (戦いのブリザード)	Hideki Sonoda	10 November 1985
7	"The Law of Heroes" (勇者達の掟)	Sukehiro Tomita	17 November 1985
8	"The Wandering Warriors" (さまよえる戦士たち)	Hideo Takayashiki	24 November 1985
9	"Farewell Howl" (別れの咆哮)	Hideki Sonoda	1 December 1985
10	"Souls Drawing Together" (歩みよる魂)	Sukehiro Tomita	8 December 1985
11	"Murmurs of the Devil" (悪魔の囁き)	Kazuhito Hisajima	15 December 1985
12	"Time of Parting" (訣別の時)	Kazuhito Hisajima	22 December 1985
13	"The Raging Stream of Destiny" (激流の運命)	Rei Hidaka	29 December 1985
14	"The Secret Disappearance" (魅惑の断章)	Kazuhito Hisajima	5 January 1986
15	"Our Homeland – So Far Away" (故郷、遥か遠く)	Yuji Watanabe	12 January 1986
16	"The Unwelcome Return" (望まれぬ帰還)	Hideo Takayashiki	19 January 1986
17	"Never-Ending Relationship" (断ち消えぬ友情)	Hideki Sonoda	26 January 1986
18	"Old Soldiers Never Die" (誇り高き戦士)	Sukehiro Tomita	2 February 1986
19	"Powerful Enemies" (立ちはだかる者)	Yuji Watanabe	9 February 1986
20	"Grathan's Gone" (焦躁の果てに)	Yuji Watanabe	16 February 1986
21	"The Shocked Universe" (震撼する宇宙)	Hideo Takayashiki	23 February 1986
22	"Run Towards the Hope" (希望への脱出)	Hideki Sonoda	2 March 1986
23	"The Recorded Road Mark" (印された道標)	Yuji Watanabe	9 March 1986
24	"Dropping Wings in Dance" (舞い降りた翼)	Hideo Takayashiki	16 March 1986
25	"A Short Meeting" (束の間の出会い)	Sukehiro Tomita	23 March 1986
26	"Heavy Quickening" (大いなる胎動)	Yuji Watanabe	30 March 1986
27	"The Transform of Position" (変わりゆく風)	Hideo Takayashiki	6 April 1986
28	"New Arousal" (新たなる目覚め)	Yuji Watanabe	13 April 1986
29	"The Forgotten Age of Seventeen" (忘れられた17歳)	Hideki Sonoda	20 April 1986
30	"The Closed Legend" (閉ざされた伝説)	Kazuhito Hisajima	27 April 1986
31	"The Respective Confusion" (それぞれの惑い)	Yuji Watanabe	4 May 1986
32	"The Endless Fight" (果てしなき苦闘)	Hideo Takayashiki	11 May 1986
33	"The Walk by Oneself" (たった一人の暴走)	Sukehiro Tomita	18 May 1986
34	"Women Ninja – Red Shadow" (女忍者・紅影)	Hideki Sonoda	25 May 1986
35	"Small Cranny" (細やかな亀裂)	Kazuhito Hisajima	1 June 1986
36	"Collapsed Authority" (崩された威信)	Yuji Watanabe	8 June 1986
37	"Growing Ambition" (迫り来る野望)	Hideo Takayashiki	15 June 1986
38	"The Final Harmony" (果たされた和睦)	Sukehiro Tomita	22 June 1986
39	"The Final Battle of Defence" (決死の攻防戦)	Hideki Sonoda	29 June 1986
40	"End of Aggression" (侵略の終焉)	Kazuhito Hisajima	6 July 1986
41	"Another Door" (もうひとつの扉)	Yuji Watanabe	13 July 1986
42	"Summary & Preface" (彼方よりの軌跡 総集編・前編)	Kazuhito Hisajima; Minoru Shinbayashi	20 July 1986
43	"Limitless Milky Way" (見果てぬ銀河 総集編・後編)	Kazuhito Hisajima; Saeko Aoki	27 July 1986

=== Games ===
Aspects of Ninja Senshi Tobikage appeared in Super Robot Wars Compact 2, Super Robot Wars Impact, Super Robot Wars UX and Super Robot Wars X-Ω.

== Release ==
=== Japan ===
The anime has been released in two DVD boxsets on 22 March 2002 and 25 June 2002 by PioneerLDC. The Blu-Ray box was sold on 26 December 2014.

=== North America ===
The series used to be streamed in North America via Yomiura Group's now defunct Anime Sols video service in spring 2013. In December 2021, the series became available for streaming on RetroCrush.

Discotek has licensed the anime for a release in North America. On 7 June 2021, the company issued calls for assistance in locating the English dub tracks for episodes 34, 37, 42 and 43. The series was released with an English dub on Blu-ray on 25 January 2022.

=== Streaming ===
As of 2023, both the Japanese version and the English Blu-ray dub of the series can be streamed on RetroCrush. Some of the episode titles have been altered, and the order of the episodes in the English version matches the original Japanese release.

The first 20 episodes of the English dub are available on Amazon Prime Video, Pluto TV, and The Roku Channel.

== Reception ==
During its time at the Cartoon Network it was well received and popular. The show has 214 reviews on IMDb, with an 8.3 user rating. Animenewsnetwork user ratings gave the show an average score of 6.34 out of 10, ranking it #5788 of the 9076 shows on the website. Neil Lumbard of Blu-Ray.com gave the North American Blu-ray release a positive review, noting the hand-drawn artwork as "a fascinating example of how excellent traditional art looks with anime series," and calling the show overall "an exciting action series with a lot to offer fans of classic (vintage) anime."
