= Final Fantasy XII =

2006 video game

- Japanese and European box art for Final Fantasy XII, designed by Yoshitaka Amano
- Developer: Square Enix
- Publisher: Square Enix
- Directors: Hiroyuki Ito; Hiroshi Minagawa
- Designer: Hiroyuki Ito
- Programmer: Takashi Katano
- Artists: Akihiko Yoshida; Hideo Minaba; Isamu Kamikokuryo
- Writers: Daisuke Watanabe; Miwa Shoda; Yasumi Matsuno
- Composers: Hitoshi Sakimoto; Hayato Matsuo; Masaharu Iwata
- Series: Final Fantasy; Ivalice Alliance
- Platforms: PlayStation 2; PlayStation 4; Windows; Nintendo Switch; Xbox One
- Release: March 16, 2006: PlayStation 2; JP: March 16, 2006; NA: October 31, 2006; AU: February 22, 2007; EU: February 23, 2007 International Zodiac Job System; PlayStation 2; JP: August 9, 2007 The Zodiac Age; PlayStation 4; WW: July 11, 2017; JP: July 13, 2017 Windows; WW: February 1, 2018 Switch, Xbox One; JP: April 25, 2019; WW: April 30, 2019
- Genre: Role-playing
- Mode: Single-player

Final Fantasy XII (Note: Japanese: ファイナルファンタジーXII, Hepburn: Fainaru Fantajī Tuerubu) is a 2006 role-playing video game developed and published by Square Enix for the PlayStation 2 in March 2006. It added elements including an open world; a seamless battle system; a controllable camera; a customizable "gambit" system, which lets the player control the artificial intelligence of characters in battle; a "license" system, which determines what abilities and equipment can be used by characters; and hunting side quests, which allows the player to find and defeat increasingly difficult monsters. Final Fantasy XII also includes elements from previous Final Fantasy games, such as Chocobos and Moogles.

The game takes place in Ivalice, where the empires of Archadia and Rozarria are waging an endless war. The small kingdom of Dalmasca is caught between the warring nations. When it is annexed by Archadia, princess Ashelia creates a resistance movement. During the struggle she meets Vaan, a young adventurer who dreams of becoming a sky pirate in command of an airship. They are joined by a band of allies and rally against the tyranny of the Archadian Empire.

Final Fantasy XII earned several Game of the Year awards and sold over six million copies on the PlayStation 2 by November 2009. In 2007, a sequel, Final Fantasy XII: Revenant Wings, was released for the Nintendo DS. An expanded version, Final Fantasy XII International Zodiac Job System, was released that year on the PlayStation 2 in Japan. A high-definition remaster of International Zodiac Job System, The Zodiac Age, was released worldwide for the PlayStation 4 in July 2017, for Windows in February 2018, and for the Nintendo Switch and Xbox One in April 2019.

== Gameplay ==
The player directly controls the character from a third-person perspective to interact with people, objects, and enemies. Unlike previous games in the series, the player can also control the camera with the right analog stick, allowing for a 360° view of the surroundings. While in towns and cities, the player may only see from the perspective of Vaan, but any character may be controlled in the field. The world of Final Fantasy XII is rendered to scale relative to the characters in it; instead of a caricature of the character roaming around miniature terrain as seen in the earlier Final Fantasy games, every area is represented proportionally. The player navigates the overworld on foot, Chocobo, or by airship. Players may save their game to a memory card using save crystals or gate crystals, and may use the latter to teleport between gate crystals. An in-game bestiary provides incidental information about the world of Final Fantasy XII.

Final Fantasy XII restructures the system of earning gil, the currency of the Final Fantasy games; instead of gil, most enemies drop "loot" which can be sold at shops. This ties into a new battle mechanic which rewards the player with improved loot for slaying a particular type of enemy multiple times in a row. Selling different types of loot also unlocks a bazaar option in shops, which provides items at a lower cost, or items exclusive to the bazaar.

=== Battle system ===
In Active Dimension Battle (ADB), characters move freely and attack as soon as they are ready. Blue lines depict the player's targets and red lines depict those of the enemies.

Excluding the massively multiplayer online role-playing game Final Fantasy XI, Final Fantasy XII is the first entry in the main Final Fantasy series not to include random encounters. Instead, enemies are visible in the overworld and the player may choose to fight or avoid them. Battles unfold in real time using the "Active Dimension Battle" (ADB) system. Battles begin when the party comes within range of an aggressive enemy, the party attacks an enemy, or a story event initiates a confrontation. When a character or enemy begins an action, target lines connect characters to other party members or enemies; different colors represent the different types of action. The player may swap to and issue commands to any of the three characters in the party, but guest characters are controlled by AI. Battle commands are initiated through a series of menus, and include Attack, Magicks, Technicks, Mist, Gambits, and Items. The player may switch any active character with an inactive character at any time, unless the active character is targeted by an attack or ability. Characters who are knocked out may also be substituted.

A new feature is the "gambit" system, which allows the player to program each character to perform certain commands in battle in response to specified conditions. Using gambits, the player may set reactions to different stimuli for each character. Each gambit consists of three parts: a target, an action, and a priority. The target specifies which ally or foe to act on and the condition for applying the action. For example, the target "Ally: HP < 70%" causes the character to target any ally whose hit points have fallen below 70%. The action is the command to be performed on the target. The priority determines which gambit to perform when multiple gambits are triggered. These heuristics guide the characters when acting autonomously, though player-directed commands are always given top priority.

In Final Fantasy XII, a mysterious phenomenon known as "Mist" is the key energy which allows characters to cast summoning magic and perform "Quickenings". After defeating an Esper in combat, the player will be able to summon it to the battlefield. Similar to Final Fantasy X, the summoned creatures become active participants in battle, as opposed to the cinematic attacks seen in previous games in the series. Unlike X, however, Espers follow hidden gambits, rather than the player's direct command. The summoner remains an active member in the fight, able to attack and cast support magic, instead of leaving the party or standing idle while the summoned creature fights. An Esper will leave the battle if either the summoner or itself is knocked out, its time limit expires, or it executes its special attack. Some Espers have origins in Final Fantasy Tactics and Tactics Advance and others are derived from the final bosses of previous Final Fantasy games such as Chaos, the final boss of the first Final Fantasy, and Zeromus, the final boss of Final Fantasy IV.

Final Fantasy XII introduces "Quickenings", a different Limit Break system from those in previous games in the series. Characters learn Quickenings by progressing to specific panels on the License Board. Each character can learn three Quickenings, which are specific to that character. Characters may string together Quickenings into large combo attacks, called Mist Chains, via timed button presses. If a Mist Chain reaches a certain length, a final strike will be initiated at the end of the Quickening cycle, called a Concurrence.

The License Board; raised panel icons indicate acquired licenses.

=== Growth system ===
As in many role-playing games (RPGs), characters "level up" each time they earn a set number of experience points from defeating enemies; each level gained increases the character's statistics and improves performance in battle. Statistics include hit points, the amount of damage a character can receive; strength, the power of the character's physical attacks; and magic, the potency of the character's magical spells.

In addition to leveling up, players may improve their characters via the License Board. The License Board is an array of panels that contain "licenses" which allow a character to perform certain actions. The board is split into the upper part comprising Magick, Technick, Accessory, and Augment (stat increases and other permanent buffs) licenses, and the bottom part with mostly Weapon and Armor licenses. To use a Magick, Technick, or piece of equipment, the character must obtain its corresponding license by spending the required amount of LP (License Points). LP are earned in battle along with the experience points. Like the Sphere Grid in Final Fantasy X, all characters may obtain all licenses on the board, but each Quickening and Esper license may only be activated by a single character.

== Plot ==
=== Setting ===
Final Fantasy XII is set within the land of Ivalice during an age when "magic was commonplace" and "airships plied the skies, crowding out the heavens". At this time, magicite, a magic-rich mineral, is commonly used in magic spells and in powering airships—a popular form of transportation in Ivalice. Ivalice is divided into three continents: Ordalia, Valendia, and Kerwon. Ordalia is located in the western part of Ivalice. The Rozarrian Empire makes its home in the vast inland plains of this continent as the eastern portion of it is largely desert and "jagd"—lawless regions so rich in Mist, the ethereal manifestation of magicite, that airships cannot function. Valendia is the home of Imperial Archadia, where lush highlands dot the landscape. Central to the story is Dalmasca, a small kingdom between the two continents and empires. Located in the middle of the Galtean Peninsula of Ordalia, Dalmasca is surrounded by an expanse of desert. The temperate climate of Dalmasca differs from the cold environs of Kerwon to the south and the lush plains of Valendia and Ordalia. During this time, Ivalice is beset by the pending war between the forces of Rozarria and Archadia. Caught between the two powerful Empires, Dalmasca and a number of smaller nations have already been subjugated by Archadia two years before the game begins.

=== Characters ===
The six main playable characters in Final Fantasy XII are Vaan (Bobby Edner/Kouhei Takeda), an energetic orphan of Rabanastre who dreams of becoming a sky pirate; Ashe (Kari Wahlgren/Mie Sonozaki), a determined princess of Dalmasca who lost her father and her husband in the Archadian invasion; Basch (Keith Ferguson/Rikiya Koyama), a disgraced knight of Dalmasca charged with treason for slaying the king; Balthier (Gideon Emery/Hiroaki Hirata), a gentlemanly sky pirate who pilots his airship, the Strahl; Fran (Nicole Fantl/Rika Fukami), Balthier's partner and a Viera exile whose knowledge extends to legends and myths; and Penelo (Catherine Taber/Marina Kozawa), Vaan's childhood friend who accompanies him on journeys to "keep an eye on him".

The Archadian Empire is ruled by House Solidor, headed by Emperor Gramis (Roger L. Jackson/Hidekatsu Shibata). The emperor's sons are Vayne (Elijah Alexander/Nobuo Tobita) and Larsa (Johnny McKeown/Yuka Imai), the former a military genius and the main antagonist, and the latter a charismatic seeker of peace. Judge Magisters, upholders of Archadian law, protect House Solidor and execute every command issued by the ruling family. The technological marvels of airships and synthetic nethicite—a form of magicite that absorbs Mist—are thanks to Doctor Cid (John Rafter Lee/Chikao Ōtsuka), a prominent researcher from Archadia. The Resistance against Archadia includes Dalmascan knight Vossler (Nolan North/Masaki Terasoma), an ally of Basch; Marquis Halim Ondore IV (Tom Kane/Akio Nojima), the game's narrator and ruler of the skycity Bhujerba; Reddas (Phil LaMarr/Takayuki Sugo), a sky pirate based in the port at Balfonheim; and the Rozarrian Empire, of which Al-Cid Margrace (David Rasner/Norio Wakamoto) is a prince of the ruling family. The mythos of Final Fantasy XII revolves around a character known as Dynast-King Raithwall, a man who once united Ivalice to create the Galtean Alliance in ages past.

=== Story ===
In Dalmasca's capital city of Rabanastre, Princess Ashelia (Ashe) of Dalmasca and Prince Rasler of Nabradia have just wed, as the Archadian Empire invades the two countries. Rasler is killed in the war, the city of Nabudis is destroyed in a single explosion, and the Dalmascan King Raminas is assassinated moments after signing a treaty of surrender. Marquis Ondore announces that the assassin was Dalmascan captain Basch, who has been sentenced to death, and that Princess Ashe has committed suicide.

Two years later, the Rabanastre street urchin Vaan ignores his friend Penelo's objections and infiltrates the palace during a dinner celebrating the appointment of Archadian prince Vayne Solidor as consul. In the treasury he finds a piece of magicite, a powerful magical crystal. He is discovered by Balthier and Fran, a pair of sky pirates looking for the magicite. The three escape as Dalmascan Resistance forces assault the palace, and in the sewers they meet the Resistance leader, Amalia, before being captured by Archadian forces. In the dungeons they meet Basch who was imprisoned but not killed, and who states his twin brother Gabranth was the one to kill the king. The four then escape together back to Rabanastre. There they discover Penelo has been kidnapped and taken to the floating city of Bhujerba.

In Bhujerba, they meet Lamont, a curious boy who is Vayne's younger brother Larsa in disguise. After they rescue Penelo, Basch confronts the Marquis over his lies but the party is captured and detained aboard the Archadian airship Leviathan, headed by Judge Ghis. On the Leviathan, the party is reunited with Amalia who is revealed to be Princess Ashe. Ghis takes the magicite, which is revealed to be the royal Dalmascan artifact "deifacted nethicite". The party escapes and as Ashe had planned to use the magicite as proof that she was the princess, the group journeys to collect another of the pieces of nethicite: the Dawn Shard. They are again captured by Ghis. When he tries to use the Dawn Shard in the Leviathan rather than the "manufacted" (artificially made) magicite it normally uses, his entire airship fleet is destroyed in a mirror of the destruction of Nabudis and the party flees again.

They encounter Larsa who seeks a peace treaty between Dalmasca and the empire. The group and Larsa go to Mt. Bur-Omisace to seek the Gran Kiltias Anastasis, Ivalice's religious leader, and beg his approval of Ashe as queen of Dalmasca. There they also meet Al-Cid Margrace, who is in talks with Larsa to avert a war between Rozarria and Archadia. Their plans are curtailed when Anastasis is killed by Archadia, and soon afterwards the Archadian emperor Gramis dies and Vayne ascends the throne.

The party journeys to Archadia where they discover Doctor Cid, the creator of manufacted magicite, who directs them to go to Giruvegan to find the source of nethicite. In Giruvegan, Ashe encounters the makers of nethicite, the immortal Occuria, who "pull the strings of history"; they give her the Treaty Blade to cut new pieces from the Sun-cryst, the source of all nethicite and its power. She learns that Venat, one of the Occuria, has defected to put the "reins of History back in the hands of Man", manipulating Vayne in his quest to conquer Ivalice and leading Cid to create manufacted magicite to reduce the relative power of the Occuria.

Ashe and the party journey to the Sun-cryst where she decides not to take her revenge by following the Occuria's wishes, but instead destroy the Sun-cryst. The party defeats Gabranth, who reveals that he killed King Raminas, and destroys the crystal. Al-Cid tells them that the Dalmascan Resistance led by Ondore is about to fight Archadia in Rabanastre, but the Archadian forces now include the Sky Fortress Bahamut. They infiltrate the Bahamut and find Larsa failing to dissuade his brother Vayne from his plans for war. They defeat Vayne and Venat, and Ashe and Larsa announce the end of the conflict to the battlefield. Larsa becomes the Archadian emperor and Ashe the Queen of Dalmasca; Basch replaces his brother Gabranth as Larsa's protector; Vaan and Penelo fly an airship to meet Balthier and Fran for another adventure.

== Development ==
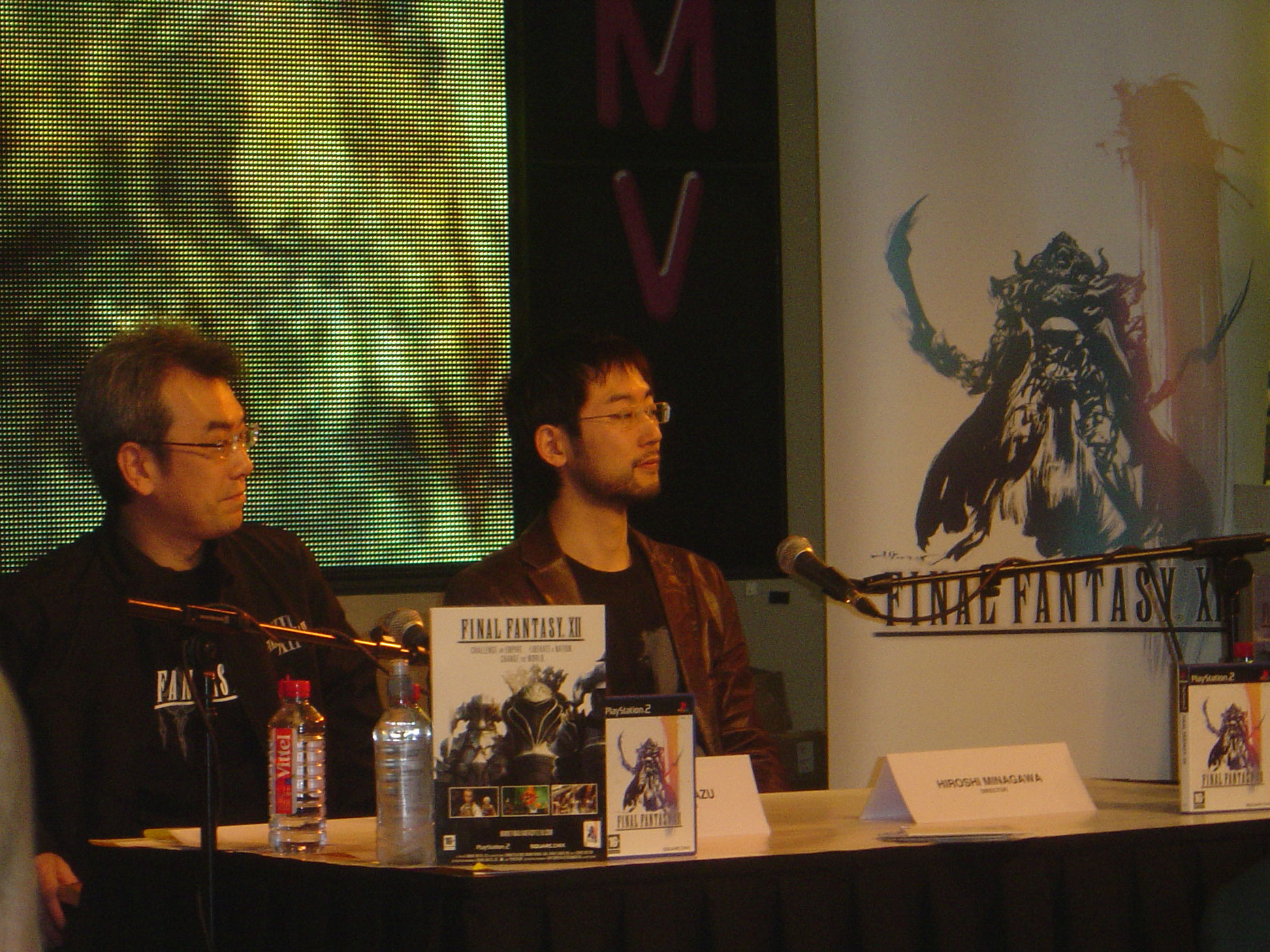
Akitoshi Kawazu (left) and Hiroshi Minagawa at the Final Fantasy XII London HMV Launch Party in 2007

Development for Final Fantasy XII began in December 2000 and was headed by Final Fantasy Tactics director Yasumi Matsuno and Final Fantasy IX director Hiroyuki Ito. Matsuno provided the original concept and plot but was forced to bow out a year before release due to health concerns. The team was restructured as a consequence: the new directorial duo consisted of Ito and Hiroshi Minagawa, while Akitoshi Kawazu of SaGa series fame became the executive producer. Series creator Hironobu Sakaguchi was disappointed by Matsuno's departure and declined to play the game beyond its introduction.

The desire to move away from random encounters was present since the beginning of development. This desire fueled the development of the Active Dimension Battle system so players could seamlessly move from battle to exploration. The gambit system was conceived early on as a way to facilitate this change. Battle system designer Hiroshi Tomomatsu said that it gradually moved away from a complex and rigid formula to the more flexible form seen in the final version. Ito drew inspiration for gambits from plays in American football where each team member has a specific job to do based on the conditions and desired outcome. As for the license system, he explained that needing "licenses" to perform certain actions was a natural extension of the rigid structured society of Archadia, as epitomized by its Judges.

At the early stages of development, Minagawa revealed that numerous ideas and features were dropped from the final stages due to certain constraints and hardware limitations. Some of these included the ability for a second player to join in the gameplay, enabling a two-player mode. Another idea that was given a considerable amount of thought was the ability to recruit non-player characters to join in the mob hunts. Due to the technical limitations of the console and multiple number of characters joining the fray, the development phase took longer than expected, causing delays.

Design inspiration came from a mix of medieval Mediterranean countries as demonstrated by the architectural styles found throughout Ivalice along with many of the races populating the region. The art team, led by art directors Hideo Minaba and Isamu Kamikokuryō, visited Turkey, which influenced the Mediterranean-style setting. The developers also used styles and deco from other sources including areas in India and New York City. Of note is the use of Sanskrit in the city of Bhujerba. Phrases such as "svagatam" (welcome) and titles like "parijanah" (guide) are lifted directly from Sanskrit. Minaba mentions that the team tried to bring out Arabic culture in the design. War is a prominent theme and the developers stated that the cutscene battles are influenced by Ancient Rome. When asked to comment on the fan observation of Star Wars similarities, Minaba replied that although he was a fan of the series, it was not necessarily an influence. It has also been noted that the similarities originate from The Hidden Fortress, the 1958 Akira Kurosawa film that inspired Star Wars.

The developers initially planned to return to the "big-headed" character designs of previous Final Fantasy games, but settled on similar proportions as characters in Vagrant Story, the team's previous game, as development progressed. Basch was the first character designed and the developers considered him the "hero" of the story at the time. Vaan and Penelo were added last and became the heroes in the final version of the plot. The developers were motivated by the commercial failure of Vagrant Story, which featured a "strong man in his prime" as the protagonist, and switched the focus to a younger protagonist as a result. Vaan's early designs were described as effeminate, but with the casting of Kouhei Takeda as his voice and motion capture actor, Vaan became less feminine and more "active, upbeat, bright and positive". Comments were made about the similarity between character designer Akihiko Yoshida's creations and those of Tetsuya Nomura, another Square Enix character designer. Yoshida felt this comparison was sparked by the choice of color used by both artists, which was based on maintaining consistent color between the characters and the environments. Non-human characters and races play a prominent role, influenced by an interest in history among the developers.

Miwa Shoda wrote a storyline on the basis of the cutscenes and world setting that had already been finished when she joined the team. Scenario writer Daisuke Watanabe in turn fleshed out Shoda's plot into a script. During the English localization process, Alexander O. Smith, who had previously worked on Vagrant Story and Final Fantasy X, acted as producer and translator. While still preserving the meaning behind the Japanese script, Smith made the decision to use different dialects of English to reproduce the regional differences in pronunciation found in the Japanese version. He also tried to distance the game from the "flat reads" found in other dubbed work by casting voice actors who had experience in theatre work. In terms of general changes, the localization team introduced widescreen 16:9 ratio support and reinserted scenes that were left out of the original Japanese version for political reasons and to preserve an "All Ages" CERO rating.

A playable demo was shipped with the North American release of Dragon Quest VIII in November 2005. To commemorate the release of Final Fantasy XII, playable demos of the English version were available at DigitalLife's Gaming Pavilion in New York City on October 11, 2006, a day dubbed "Final Fantasy XII Gamer's Day". Additionally, Square Enix gave fans the chance to cosplay as characters from XII. Each person was asked to show Square Enix three photos of his or her costume for a chance to win a trip to New York and participate in the Final Fantasy XII Gamer's Day event.

Final Fantasy XII once held the Guinness World Record for longest development period in a video game production, with a total of five years, spanning from 2001 until its release in 2006. At a Final Fantasy XII "postmortem" at MIT in March 2009, Hiroshi Minagawa mentioned that several years of production were devoted to the creation of custom tools used for the development. It was also listed as 8th on the Guinness top 50 games of all time in 2009.

=== Music ===
Hitoshi Sakimoto composed and arranged most of the soundtrack, with Hayato Matsuo and Masaharu Iwata creating seven and two tracks respectively. Nobuo Uematsu, following his departure from Square Enix in 2004, only contributed the ending song, "Kiss Me Good-Bye". Sakimoto experienced difficulty following in Uematsu's footsteps, but he decided to create a unique soundtrack in his own way. "Kiss Me Good-Bye" was performed in both English and Japanese by Angela Aki. Aki's style of playing the keyboard while singing reminded Uematsu of his childhood idol, Elton John, which was one of the reasons he chose her. The English version of the song was featured in both the Japanese and North American versions. In addition to the theme song, violinist Taro Hakase co-composed, arranged, and performed the ending credits theme, Symphonic Poem "Hope", along with Yuji Toriyama.

Two promotional soundtracks were released before the original soundtrack, Symphonic Poem "Hope" and The Best of the Final Fantasy XII Soundtrack, on March 1 and 15, 2006, respectively. The former contains all the music used in the trailer performed by Taro Hakase, including Symphonic Poem "Hope". The original soundtrack itself was released two months later in Japan on May 31. It consists of 4 CDs with 100 tracks, and includes promotional tracks not in the final game. The CD single for "Kiss Me Good-Bye" was released on the March 15, 2006. A limited edition was also released, featuring a DVD containing the music video for "Kiss Me Good-Bye". Tofu Records has released an abridged version of the original soundtrack, which contains 31 songs, including "Kiss Me Good-Bye".

== Merchandise ==
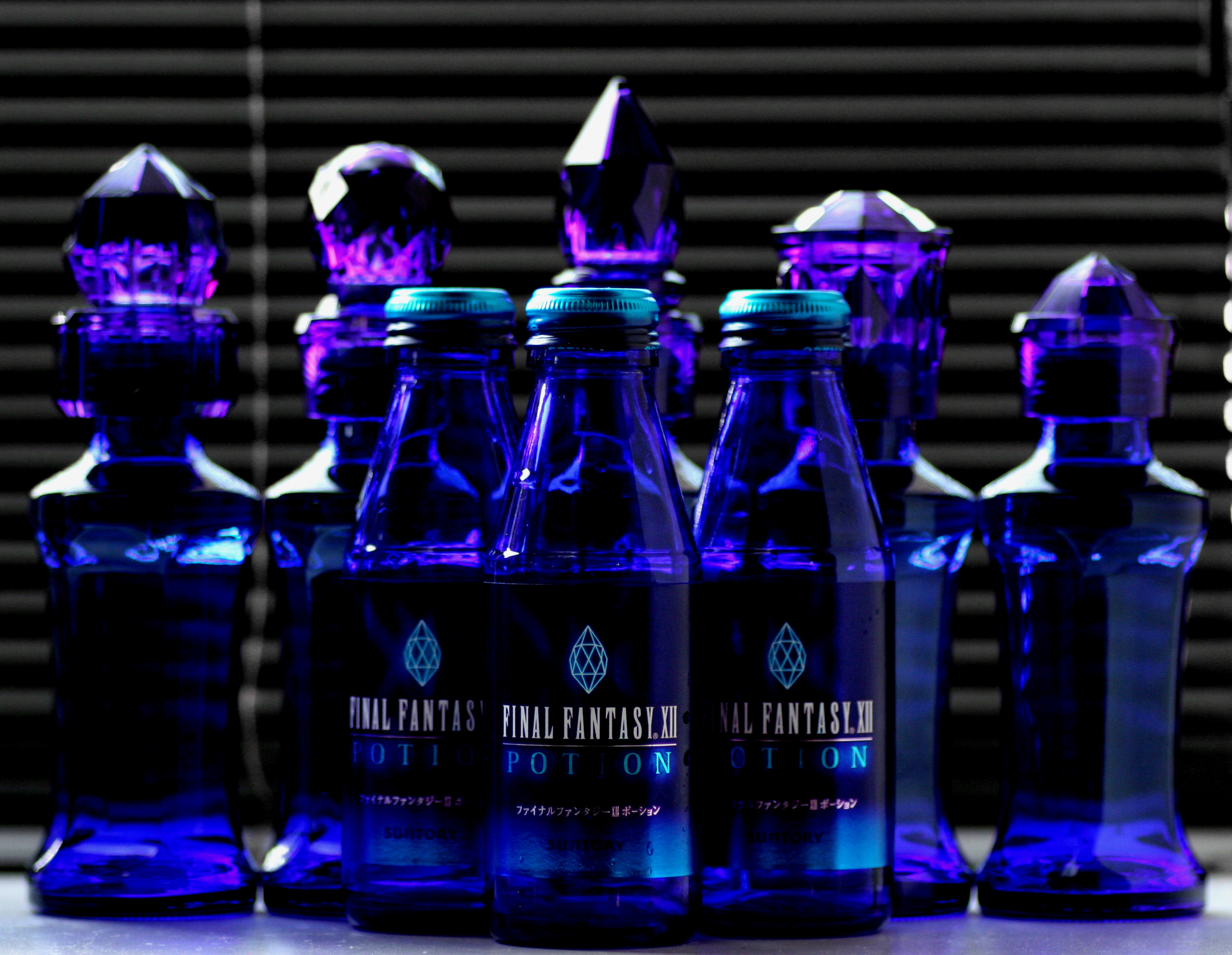
Bottles of Final Fantasy XII Potions

On March 16, 2006, Sony Computer Entertainment Japan released a special Final Fantasy XII package, which contained a PlayStation 2 game system, the Final Fantasy XII game, a standard DualShock controller, and a vertical console stand. The Japanese third-party manufacturer Hori also released Final Fantasy XII memory cards on the day of the release; stickers of Final Fantasy XII characters are included. Game peripheral maker Logicool (Logitech's Japanese branch) released a special edition Final Fantasy XII controller on the same day. Suntory produced "Final Fantasy XII Potion"—a drink containing such ingredients as royal jelly, chamomile, sage, thyme, and marjoram. The drinks became commercially available in Japan on March 7. Suntory also released a Final Fantasy XII Premium Box, which came with a Final Fantasy XII collector's card. The Potion was a limited edition product and is no longer available. Final Fantasy XII was also adapted into a manga by Amou Gin. Square Enix published the series in a total of five tankōbon volumes from December 22, 2006, to August 22, 2009.

Studio BentStuff published three Ultimania books in 2006: Final Fantasy XII Battle Ultimania and the Final Fantasy XII Scenario Ultimania on June 16, and Final Fantasy XII Ultimania Ω on November 24. The Battle Ultimania provides a description and analysis of the new battle system and its components, and developer interviews. The Scenario Ultimania describes the main scenarios, profiles on the characters and areas in Ivalice, developer interviews, and details on each location. The last guide, the Ultimania Ω, includes voice actor interviews, the complete story of Final Fantasy XII including additional character profiles, a collection of artworks and illustrations, the complete play guide, and a novella written by Benny Matsuyama, author of Hoshi wo Meguru Otome from the Final Fantasy VII Ultimania Ω Guide. Another Ultimania edition, the Final Fantasy XII International Zodiac Job System Ultimania, was released on September 6, 2007, as a guide book for the International Zodiac version. The game was re-released as part of the Final Fantasy 25th Anniversary Ultimate Box Japanese package in December 2012.

For the North American release, a "Collector's Edition" was available through GameStop and EB Games. This edition includes the original game packaged in a metallic case along with a special bonus disc, which contains Final Fantasy XII developer interviews, an art gallery, U.S. and Japanese trailers, and a featurette, "History of Final Fantasy", which gives a brief overview of Final Fantasy games. On January 26, 2007, Square Enix Product Blog revealed full-color Gabranth, Ashe, Balthier, and Vaan figures. In 2007, Balthier featured in Final Fantasy Tactics: War of the Lions as a playable character.

== Reception ==
Reception

Aggregate scores
Aggregator	Score
Metacritic	PS2: 92/100; PS4: 86/100; PC: 83/100; NS: 85/100; XONE: 80/100
OpenCritic	91% recommend(The Zodiac Age) (Note: Based on 125 reviews)

Review scores
Publication	Score
1Up.com	A
AllGame	5/5
Edge	9/10
Electronic Gaming Monthly	9.0/10
Eurogamer	10/10
Famitsu	40/40
Game Informer	9.25/10
GameSpot	9.0/10
GameTrailers	8.0/10
IGN	9.5/10
PlayStation Official Magazine – UK	10/10

Awards
Publication	Award
Edge Awards 2006	Best Game
Famitsu Awards 2006	Game of the Year Award
Japan Game Awards 2006	Grand Award, Award for Excellence
GameSpot Awards 2006	Best PS2 Game
IGN Awards 2006	Best PS2 Game

Final Fantasy XII received "universal acclaim" according to review aggregator Metacritic. It was the sixth game to receive a perfect score from the Japanese gaming magazine Famitsu. It was also the second Yasumi Matsuno game to garner a perfect score, after Vagrant Story (2000). The game was praised for its graphics, scenarios, game system, and the freshness it brought to the Final Fantasy series. It was praised for its seamless transitions between full motion video segments and the in-game engine, and was voted number one for Best Art Style on IGN's weekly Top Ten. Newtype USA named Final Fantasy XII its "Game of the Month" for November 2006, praised the gameplay, graphics, and story, and called it "the best RPG to have been released for any Sony platform".

Although GameSpot lauded the gambit and license systems as an innovative and in-depth way for the player to control the characters, it criticized them for being too complicated and difficult to adjust to, especially for newer players of the series. The reviewer also criticized the sometimes tedious back and forth travel. On the other hand, GameSpot took particular note of the "excellent" voice cast. IGN praised the rich storyline, artistic direction and "sheer depth of character". It also assuaged criticism that the gambit system would "let the game play itself", countering that gambits do not function without a player. However, IGN wrote that while "still extremely strong", Final Fantasy XII has one of the series' weaker soundtracks.

Executive producer Akitoshi Kawazu was pleased by Famitsu's rating but admitted that he thought the game was not perfect; he felt that the storyline did not meet some fans' expectations. Kawazu expressed his frustration and regrets regarding the storyline, citing creative differences between the PlayOnline and Final Fantasy Tactics members of the development team.

Final Fantasy XII was named best PlayStation 2 game and best RPG by numerous video game journals and websites, including GameSpot, GameSpy and IGN. Both Edge and Famitsu awarded it Game of the Year 2006. The Japan Game Awards 2006 honored Final Fantasy XII with their "Grand Award" and "Award for Excellence" and the PlayStation Awards 2006 bestowed the "Double Platinum Prize". It was selected for the list "Top 100 New Japanese Styles", a list of "products and services originating in Japan to serve as a mark of excellence". Final Fantasy XII also received nominations in such categories as best RPG, story, art direction, character design and original musical score at the AIAS' Interactive Achievement Awards, Game Developers Choice Awards, BAFTA Video Games Awards, Spike Video Game Awards, and the Satellite Awards.

=== Sales ===
Final Fantasy XII sold more than 1,764,000 copies in its first week in Japan, almost equaling the sales of Final Fantasy X in its first week. A Square Enix conference report stated that Final Fantasy XII sold more than 2.38 million copies in Japan in the two weeks since its March 16, 2006, release. In North America, Final Fantasy XII shipped approximately 1.5 million copies in its first week. It was the fourth best-selling PlayStation 2 game of 2006 worldwide. As of March 2007, the game had shipped over 5.2 million copies worldwide. By November 2009, over 6 million copies had been sold worldwide on PlayStation 2. As of October 2017, the PlayStation 4 remaster shipped over one million copies worldwide.

== Sequels and re-releases ==
=== International Zodiac Job System ===
An expanded version, Final Fantasy XII International Zodiac Job System, was released in Japan on August 10, 2007. It includes twelve license boards (instead of the original game's one), each corresponding to a different Zodiac sign and job. The player can control guest characters and summons, and hold L1 to double the game's running speed. There is also a "New Game+" option, a "New Game- (minus)" option (in which characters do not gain experience), and a "Trial Mode" in which the player hunts monsters in 100 different maps to gain items and money. The game also includes the western version's English voices and widescreen 16:9 support, and a bonus DVD.

=== Revenant Wings ===
A sequel, Final Fantasy XII: Revenant Wings, was released for the Nintendo DS in 2007. It takes place one year after the events of Final Fantasy XII and follows the adventures of Vaan. It is one of four in the Ivalice Alliance series, which also includes International Zodiac Job System.

=== Fortress ===
Fortress, an action role-playing game developed by Grin, was to have been a spin-off game that took place following the events of Revenant Wings. Square Enix cancelled the project after six months of development.

=== The Zodiac Age ===
In July 2017, Square Enix released Final Fantasy XII: The Zodiac Age, a high-definition remaster of the Japanese-only International Zodiac Job System for the PlayStation 4. It adds trophy support, a remastered soundtrack with a few new tracks, and improved technical performance. The Zodiac Age was nominated for "Best Remake/Remaster" at IGN's Best of 2017 Awards, and won "Best Remaster" at Game Informer's Best of 2017 Awards and 2017 RPG of the Year Awards. The remaster also received favorable reviews. The Zodiac Age was largely developed by Virtuos, who previously developed Final Fantasy X/X-2 HD Remaster for Square Enix.

A version for Windows was released via Steam on February 1, 2018. The port included support for higher display resolutions and 60 frames-per-second rendering, options to switch between three different versions of the soundtrack, and immediate access to the post-game modes. Versions for the Nintendo Switch and Xbox One were released on April 30, 2019.

== Legacy ==
The gambit system inspired similar systems used in other games such as Dragon Age: Origins and Pillars of Eternity II. Final Fantasy XIV also used the gambit system as a base for its "Trust System", a mechanic that pairs online players with story characters controlled by artificial intelligence. The game incorporated several regions and characters from Final Fantasy XII into its game world, alongside other games from the Ivalice universe with Yasumi Matsuno as a guest creator. Michael-Christopher Koji Fox, the translation director of Final Fantasy XIV indicated in an interview that the team have a lot of people who worked on Final Fantasy XII and "is one of the games they wanted to borrow heavily from because they thought it was really cool, and they really liked the imagery and lore that it had". Astria Ascending used its job system seen in later re-releases as a source of inspiration for its gameplay system. The Diofield Chronicle used the game as one source of inspiration for its controls and player movement. The localization of Final Fantasy XII was praised as a high point of the series and video games as a whole. Lead localizers Alexander O. Smith and Joseph Reeder went on to collaborate again on Tactics Ogre: Wheel of Fortune, the remake of a previous Yasumi Matsuno game, with its localization also receiving high praise. Producers of The Zodiac Age said that they were considering another game set in the Ivalice universe, adding that earlier projects faded away due to original development members working on other games.
