= Final Fantasy XII: Revenant Wings =

2007 video game

- North American cover art for Revenant Wings
- Developers: Think & Feel; Square Enix
- Publisher: Square Enix
- Directors: Motomu Toriyama; Takanari Ishiyama
- Producers: Yasuhito Watanabe; Eisuke Yokoyama
- Artists: Toshitaka Matsuda; Isamu Kamikokuryo; Ryoma Itō
- Writers: Motomu Toriyama; Takanari Ishiyama
- Composers: Kenichiro Fukui; Hitoshi Sakimoto
- Series: Final Fantasy; Ivalice Alliance
- Platform: Nintendo DS
- Release: JP: April 26, 2007; NA: November 20, 2007; AU: February 14, 2008; EU: February 15, 2008
- Genre: Real-time strategy
- Mode: Single-player

Final Fantasy XII: Revenant Wings (Note: Japanese: ファイナルファンタジーXII レヴァナント・ウイング, Hepburn: Fainaru Fantajī Revananto Uingu) is a real-time strategy video game co-developed by Think & Feel and Square Enix, and published by Square Enix for the Nintendo DS in 2007 in Japan and North America, and 2008 in PAL territories. A standalone sequel to Final Fantasy XII (2006), the game is the debut project of the Ivalice Alliance, a group of games set in the titular fictional universe. Revenant Wings follows protagonists Vaan and Penelo as they become sky pirates and end up involved in a conflict surrounding the floating continent of Lemurés. The gameplay features the player controlling groups of summoned monsters to complete different mission objectives.

Production on Revenant Wings began with the intent of creating an original and accessible Final Fantasy title for the platform. Its connection to Ivalice was added after the success of Final Fantasy XII. Staff included director and co-writer Motomu Toriyama, and artists Isamu Kamikokuryo and Ryoma Itō. The gameplay drew inspiration from Warcraft and Age of Empires. Original music was composed by Kenichiro Fukui, with most of the musical score using arrangements of the Final Fantasy XII soundtrack by Hitoshi Sakimoto.

The game was announced in September 2006, with its place in the Ivalice Alliance confirmed later that year. The international version was adjusted to have increased difficulty and additional content. The game sold over one million copies worldwide, and was positively received by game journalists. Many praised its graphics and presentation as some of the best on the platform. The story saw mixed reactions, with many noting its tonal shift from Final Fantasy XII. The gameplay was mostly praised, but issues with its stylus-based controls and artificial intelligence were noted.

== Gameplay ==
A combat mission in Final Fantasy XII: Revenant Wings.

Final Fantasy XII: Revenant Wings is a real-time strategy (RTS) video game in which the player takes control of squads controlled by commanders, completing missions on maps often tied to the in-game story. After a point, the player is given access to an airship which can navigate to different areas of the world, although only a few can be accessed at a time. Upon landing, the player can then select missions. On the ship after a certain point, an area appears that houses a shops for equipment and materials, and a "artificer" who can craft new items and equipment from resources collected during missions.

Combat zones are viewed from a fixed overhead perspective with 3D graphics, and characters animated as 2D sprites. During combat, the player controls units using the Nintendo DS touchscreen and D-pad, selecting units or moving the camera to observe other map areas or direct units to different positions. The unit and map screens can be switched between the top and bottom screen depending on what functions are needed.

Alongside main story quests, the party can engage in option side quests posted on an in-game bulletin board; missions in general have a range of objectives such as clearing a field of enemies or gaining a specific item. Units are set up in a menu before combat, arranged in loadouts called decks allocated to up to five unit leaders, and assigned specific abilities; with their loadout not being changeable once the mission has begun. Some leader units focus on attacking, and some on support abilities. Upon completing a level, leader units will gain an experience level, and areas can be returned to for repeated battles.

Summoned monsters−dubbed Espers in-game−act as the main fighting force in combat, with the party unlocking them using crystals called auracite earned during missions. The Espers are based on established Final Fantasy summons, such as Shiva and Ifrit, Espers featured in Final Fantasy XII, and recurring creatures such as the chocobo. Summons are handled using the Ring of Pacts, a menu allowing summons to be selected and called using dedicated gates within the map. These gates can also be used to raise an Esper's level using a resource dubbed AP. Espers are split into ranks, with these ranks determining their strengths and abilities, with only one of any type appearing in each rank. Depending on their rank, Espers will cost more to summon. Unit strengths are influenced by a rock-paper-scissors affinity system: melee is strong against ranged, ranged against flying, and flying against melee. Both allied and enemy units also have elemental strengths and weaknesses, with initial assignments to leader units being determined by elemental affinity.

Some combat mechanics are carried over from Final Fantasy XII (2006) and adapted into the game's combat system. Each unit's artificial intelligence (AI) can be given a command instruction called a Gambit, which prioritizes the use of a particular ability or magic command depending on combat conditions. Only one Gambit can be active at once, with other abilities needing manual activation. Leader units can learn special abilities dubbed Quickenings.

== Synopsis ==
=== Setting and characters ===
Revenant Wings is set in the world of Ivalice, taking place a year after the events of Final Fantasy XII and featuring locations and terminology from that game. A new location is Lemurés, a floating landmass hidden from the surface world which has become the stuff of legends. Its isolation and origins are tied to Feolthanos, a god whose influence continues through pieces of auracite. Due to the destruction of an artifact called the Sun-Cryst in Final Fantasy XII, Lemurés becomes accessible to the surface world. Living in isolation on Lemurés are the Aegyl, a people similar to Ivalice's Humes with wings on their backs; while powerful and wise, they lack curiosity and dreams. A recurring faction are the Espers or Yarhi, summoned monsters tied to Ivalice's past. While similar in appearance to earlier versions, the Espers are born in a different way to those in Final Fantasy XII.

The main characters are Vaan and Penelo, key characters in the events of Final Fantasy XII who have become the leaders of a band of sky pirates. When they arrive on Lemurés, they are joined by Llyud, an Aegyl resident of Lemurés who is ostracized due to his curiosity. The group are later joined by Balthier and his partner Fran, veteran sky pirates who were Vaan's allies during the events of Final Fantasy XII. Two further major characters from Final Fantasy XII, Ashelia "Ashe" B'nargin Dalmasca and Basch fon Ronsenburg, also appear; Ashe now rules as queen of Dalmasca, and Basch guards the new Arcadian emperor Larsa Solidor as a Judge.

=== Plot ===
Heading out from their home in Dalmasca's capital of Rabanastre, Vaan and Penelo are pursuing Balthier and Fran, who are searching for a treasure called the Cache of Glabados. Upon retrieving the Cache, a pair of crystals, the temple collapses and Vaan loses his airship. Returned to Rabanastre, Vaan and Penelo then witness a derelict airship landing outside the city. Sneaking on board with a group of friends, Vaan and Penelo are transported by the ship to Lemurés, home of the Aegyl. While exploring they run into Llyud, who reveals that the Aegyl are at war with sky pirate bands commanded by a figure dubbed the Judge of Wings. The Judge of Wings seeks the three auralith, powerful shards of auracite that keep Lemurés airborne. While Vaan and Penelo attempt to help the Aegyl, the Judge of Wings destroys the first auralith, granting the party a vision of Balthier's death at the Judge's hands. The Aegyl also begin acting more aggressively.

During their search for information on the Judge, the party discovers the second auralith's location, but when they reach it the Judge summons the esper Bahamut and damages their airship before fleeing. While on the island, the party run into another adventurer, Velis, who is seeking his lover Mydia. The group eventually find Velis is an esper, forcing them to destroy him, and that Mydia is the Judge of Wings; a third crystal that formed part of the Cache of Glabados is empowering her. After repairing their ship, the party recruit Fran and find Balthier, but after they drive off the Judge he destroys the second auralith, which transports the party to an illusory realm. While within the realm, the party learn that Lemurés was created by Feolthanos in rebellion against the Occuria, god-like beings who controlled Ivalice. He isolated the Aegyl, but the auraliths required the anima (souls) of the Aegyl to function, which has gradually drained them of their spirits and turned their dead into Espers.

Escaping with the party, Vaan recruits Balthier, who reveals he knew of Lemurés's history and that the Judge of Wings is now an anima-drained puppet of Feolthanos who is harvesting anima for am unknown purpose. As the party head to confront Feolthanos, they are joined by allied forces from the surface led by Ashe and Basch. As the auraliths were destroyed, the Aegyl's restored anima has driven them into a frenzy and they have begun attacking Ivalice. After defeating the Judge of Wings, Myria's freed anima guides them to Feolthanos, revealed to be an Aegyl who attained immortality by merging with the final auralith and now seeks to destroy Ivalice. The party destroy Feolthanos and the last auralith, dispelling the Espers and causing Lemurés to fall from the sky. The now-pacified Aegyl leave with Llyud to find a new home, and the party goes their separate ways.

== Development ==
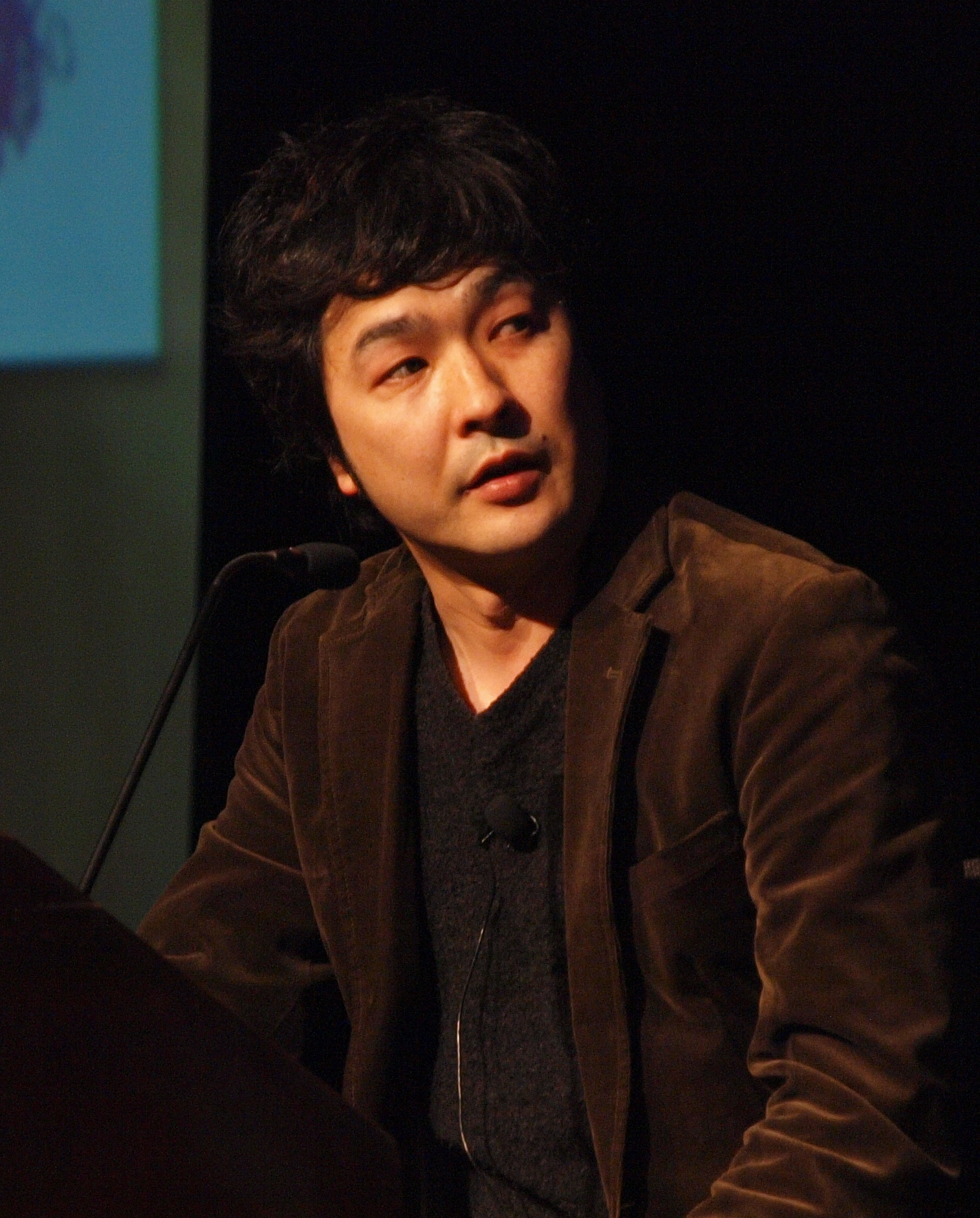
Director and co-writer Motomu Toriyama at the 2010 Game Developers Conference.

Revenant Wings was co-developed by Final Fantasy series developer Square Enix, and Japanese studio Think & Feel. The development staff included multiple series veterans including Motomu Toriyama as director and co-writer, and Akitoshi Kawazu as executive producer. Yasuhito Watanabe and Eisuke Yokoyama of Think & Feel co-produced, and Takanari Ishiyama co-directed and co-wrote with Toriyama. Describing the initial development goals, Toriyama said the team wanted to create an original Final Fantasy title for the Nintendo DS that would be a beginner-friendly entry point and take advantage of its controls. Yokoyama stated that the game was a standalone title in its early production, with its combat system being designed first. After Final Fantasy XII was released and proved popular, the game was incorporated by Toriyama's team into its world. Square Enix partnered with Think & Feel due to their work on Monster Summoner, an RTS for the Game Boy Advance. While Square Enix handled story and graphics, Think & Feel were in charge of data management. Most of the staff were unrelated to the teams that designed earlier Ivalice titles.

While the story was set after Final Fantasy XII and featured the same cast, Yokoyama said it should be considered as a standalone series title. Toriyama found creating a story within the pre-existing restrictions of the Ivalice setting fun, and after getting approval for the sky pirate theme and using the original cast, the team had "free reign" [sic] while still being overseen by the Final Fantasy XII team. Compared to Final Fantasy XII, which had a politics-focused narrative and main characters from noble or royal backgrounds, Revenant Wings was written as a more light-hearted adventure told from the perspective of Ivalice's common folk. Also in contrast to Final Fantasy XII, Vaan and Penelo were made the centre of the story and cast, and minor characters were given substantial supporting roles. For Penelo specifically, the team included a scene with her dancing, which had been in early materials for Final Fantasy XII but not shown in-game. Commenting on comparisons made between Final Fantasy XII and the Star Wars movies, Toriyama described Revenant Wings as being similar to Episode III – Revenge of the Sith in how it revealed a part of Ivalice's unseen history. The in-game violence was kept low so the game could have a broad appeal.

For the gameplay design, Yokoyama drew inspiration from Warcraft and Age of Empires, which he had played and enjoyed as a student. As the RTS genre was not popular in Japan, Yokoyama wanted Revenant Wings to include the enjoyment of the genre while being accessible. The team also played both Final Fantasy XII as a reference point, and popular DS titles to see what had made them resonate with players. Toriyama described the game's design as making use of the DS's touchscreen controls to create a combat system which blended real-time strategy with the command-based elements of Final Fantasy XII. An airship with a freely-explorable world map was in place from the start of development, features that Toriyama was eager to include. Bringing the original gameplay of Final Fantasy XII over directly was considered, but the team opted to focus on player accessibility. Through to late development and during testing the team considered implementing a form of multiplayer, but dropped the idea due to time and technical limitations so the game could be released as a polished single-player title.

The art team included Toshitaka Matsuda as art director, Isamu Kamikokuryo supervising, and Ryoma Itō as character designer. Speaking about his role, Itō said he "traded secrets" with Final Fantasy XII character designer Akihiko Yoshida before redesigning the cast for Revenant Wings. He also drew from his work on Tactics Advance, where his redesigns met with approval by its producer Yasumi Matsuno. He was pleased to work on more minor characters from Final Fantasy XII as they were brought back in a larger role. Talking about Penelo's redesign, Toriyama said that a more "feminine" image was being emphasised compared to her "sporty" fashion from Final Fantasy XII. Sprite-based graphics were chosen over 3D polygons both to have large moving crowds within the DS's technical limitations, and to portray a "warmth and handcrafted feel". The in-game sprites for summons needed to be redesigned in places to remain appealing on the DS hardware, such as the Salamander summon changing from a lizard to a wild boar. Kamikokuryo designed the player's airship, and the game's logo art. The CGI movies were directed by Eiji Fujii, who had previously worked on Final Fantasy: The Spirits Within (2001). Toriyama described the movies as being created using "proprietary technology", using both DS screens and needing individual rendering. The high quality was "a matter of cramming as much as possible" onto the DS game card.

=== Music ===
The music for Revenant Wings was handled by Kenichiro Fukui, who was lead composer, with Hitoshi Sakimoto as supervising composer. Much of the score was arrangements of tracks from Final Fantasy XII. Additional arrangements were done by Mitsuhiro Kaneda, Kimihiro Abe and Noriyuki Kamikura. Due to hardware limitations, the amount of musical elements that could be used for the DS was limited, so the score was rearranged with this in mind. The arrangements also had to account for the story's lighter tone. Toriyama said the team worked "overtime" to properly translate the music into the DS environment at high quality. Sakimoto felt the hardware change was not overly restrictive, despite some highlighted issues with memory and reverb.

== Release ==
Revenant Wings was announced in September 2006, and in December it was confirmed to be the first title within the Ivalice Alliance, a collection of games set within the titular world. Commenting on the game's position in the group, Toriyama stated that there was no communication between development teams beyond ensuring continuity and no overlapping content. The title was described as having multiple meanings, referencing both the Final Fantasy XII world expanding onto new hardware, and tying into the game's story. The game was released by Square Enix in Japan on April 26, 2007. A special "Sky Pirates Edition" released alongside the standard version, coming packaged with a themed Nintendo DS Lite. An Ultimania guidebook, containing both gameplay explanations and developer interviews, was published on June 14, 2007.

The localization was handled by the same team who worked on Final Fantasy XII. Yutaka Sano and Satoko Kondo served as co-directors, and the translation was by Joseph Reeder who had worked on earlier Ivalice titles. While the story was unchanged between regions, the gameplay was adjusted for Western players who would be more familiar with the RTS genre. The changes included raising the combat difficulty, adjusting tutorials, changes to character leveling, allowing players to change enemy AI behavior with Gambits, additional harder dungeons, and the Yazmat superboss from Final Fantasy XII. Revenant Wings was among a number of titles exhibited by Square Enix at E3 2007. The game was released in North America on November 20, 2007. The game launched the following year in PAL regions; on February 14, 2008, in Australia, and February 15, 2008, in Europe. Ubisoft acted as distributor for some European countries.

== Reception ==
Reception

Aggregate score
Aggregator	Score
Metacritic	81/100

Review scores
Publication	Score
1Up.com	B+
Electronic Gaming Monthly	7.17/10
Eurogamer	8/10
Famitsu	32/40
Game Informer	7.5/10
GameSpot	8.5/10
IGN	8.3/10
Nintendo Power	7.5/10
PALGN	6.5/10
RPGamer	3.5/5

Revenant Wings was the top-selling video game during its first week on sale in Japan. As of August 2008, Revenant Wings has sold 1.04 million units worldwide, with 540,000 units sold in Japan, 220,000 units in North America, and 280,000 units in Europe.

The story met with varied reactions. Eurogamer's Rob Fahey enjoyed the narrative as a return to the world of Ivalice, and praised Vaan as a character who stood out better than in Final Fantasy XII. Jeremy Parish of 1Up.com similarly noted that Vaan's greater prominence compared to Final Fantasy XII, calling Revenant Wings "very much his tale". GameSpot's Lark Anderson described the story as "deep and engrossing", and Bryan Boulette of RPGamer found it fun and enjoyable if fairly simple. IGN's Mark Bozon felt that the title's tone was a throwback to earlier classic Final Fantasy titles. Chris Hoffman of Nintendo Power called the story "not particularly groundbreaking", but well told and having appeal for fans of Final Fantasy XII. Electronic Gaming Monthly was unimpressed by the story, feeling it lacked grandeur to match other parts of the presentation. Harry Milonas of PALGN noted a lack of compelling narrative beats and reliance on series tropes. Joe Juba of Game Informer felt the story was a poor excuse to revisit the world; by contrast Mat Miller called it "a suitably epic follow-up to its source material". Several reviewers compared the game's tonal change to that of Final Fantasy X-2 (2003). When mentioned, the localization met with praise.

The graphics and music met with general praise. Famitsu positively described the pixel art and CGI cutscenes as high quality, and Hoffman gave general nonspecific praise to the CGI cutscenes. Milonas cited the graphical presentation as the game's strongest aspect, praising the translation of character and Esper designs into the cuter art style. Bozon called the CGI camera work the best on the platform, and similarly praised the blend of 2D and 3D graphics. Fahey felt the presentation alone made Revenant Wings one of the most impressive titles on the DS. Anderson praised the animations alongside the general quality, but noted slowdown during battles with a large number of units in play. Boulette called the game's graphics "nothing short of beautiful", highlighting its colour usage and again mentioning the mixture of 2D and 3D elements. Electronic Gaming Monthly lauded the visuals as impressive for the platform, and both Juba and Miller both praised the CGI scenes as some of the best on the platform. The music was praised for its high quality, although Boulette faulted a lack of original tracks.

The gameplay was mostly praised, but some reviewers found issues with its controls. Anderson found the combat and unit management enjoyable, but noted the map designs sometimes obscured unit movement due to the fixed camera. Japanese gaming magazine Famitsu praised the gameplay as both accessible and fun, though one reviewer wished for a button-based control scheme. Fahey found the overall combat system and late-game challenge entertaining, but felt the game was led down by "some rather fiddly controls". Bozon was positive about the amount of gameplay content, but noted issues with inconsistent AI behaviour and difficulty selecting individual units from crowds. Electronic Gaming Monthly, while faulting a lack of challenge and issues with its touchscreen controls and small display, praised the RTS gameplay as an improvement over the similar Heroes of Mana. Juba also called the game a mechanical improvement over Heroes of Mana despite some problems selecting units with the stylus controls, and Miller further noted issues with units not following commands properly. Hoffman enjoyed the combat system and said the gameplay worked well for the most part, but encountered problems with unresponsive AI and difficulties commanding large crowds of units. Boulette found the combat system entertaining and challenging at points, though disliked the lack of customization options for units. Parish positively noted some challenging combat sections and unit management, but was disappointed at the simplified implementation of Gambits. Milonas faulted the simplification of gameplay elements from both the RTS genre and Final Fantasy XII specifically, and found the stylus controls difficult to handle.
