= Vaan (Final Fantasy) =

Fictional character in Final Fantasy

- Final Fantasy character
- Concept artwork of Vaan for Final Fantasy XII by main artist Akihiko Yoshida
- First appearance: Itadaki Street Special (2004)
- First major appearance: Final Fantasy XII (2006)
- Created by: Yasumi Matsuno
- Designed by: Akihiko Yoshida
- Voiced by: English: Bobby Edner; Japanese: Kouhei Takeda Kenshō Ono (Dissidia 012 Final Fantasy – present)

In-universe information
- Home: Rabanastre

Vaan (Japanese: ヴァン, Hepburn: Van) is a character in the Final Fantasy series from Square Enix. Created by Yasumi Matsuno and designed by Akihiko Yoshida, he is the main protagonist of Final Fantasy XII. Final Fantasy XII establishes Vaan as an orphaned teenager from Rabanastre who dreams of becoming a sky pirate. He and his best friend Penelo join Dalmasca Princess Ashe in her fight against the tyranny of the Archadian Empire. Vaan also takes a more active role in the sequel Final Fantasy XII: Revenant Wings and has also been featured in few Final Fantasy crossover games.

Vaan was conceptualized as the main character for Final Fantasy XII in order to contrast the older hero from Square's previous title Vagrant Story as a result of negative feedback received by fans. Critical reception to Vaan's character has been mixed as a result of his lack of involvement with Final Fantasy XII's plot, although various video game publications still found him likable.

== Appearances ==
Vaan was first introduced in the 2004 crossover board game Itadaki Street Special for the PlayStation 2. He also appears in Itadaki Street Portable for the PlayStation Portable.

The protagonist of Final Fantasy XII, Vaan is a 17-year-old orphaned street urchin who lost his parents in a plague when he was 12 years old. His only brother, Reks, died two years prior to the start of the game, during the Archadian invasion of Dalmasca. He makes a living as Migelo's assistant, running various errands for him, while at the same time pickpocketing from Archadian soldiers while claiming to take back what is Dalmasca's. He is a cheerful and energetic boy. Vaan dreams of someday becoming a sky pirate in command of his own airship. He trains to meet this goal by killing dire rats in the sewers of Rabanastre on a daily basis, for which Dalan gave him the nickname "Vaan Ratsbane". Despite nominally being the protagonist, the majority of the game focuses on the events and conflicts of the world as a whole and of Ashe, rather than Vaan's individual problems, with his character instead used as a narrative device to allow the player to follow the events as an outside observer. During the course of the game, Vaan comes to understand that he has spent his time running from his problems and blaming the Archadian empire for them, rather than moving on with his life after his brother and parents' deaths. Vaan ends the game as a sky pirate, traveling the world along with Penelo. He also reprises his role from Final Fantasy XII in the manga adaptation by Gin Amou.

During the events of Final Fantasy XII: Revenant Wings, Vaan becomes captain of the Airship Galbana and uses it to travel to Lemurés, meeting old friends while making new ones. By Final Fantasy Tactics A2: Grimoire of the Rift Vaan's and Penelo's adventures take them to the Jylland region of Ivalice, where they get caught up in events surrounding Clan Gully and a boy from another world named Luso Clemens, eventually joining up with the clan for a time.

Vaan also appears in the PlayStation Portable fighting game, Dissidia 012 Final Fantasy, as one of Cosmos' warriors who seek to eliminate creatures known as Maninkins. He returns in the game's sequel, Dissidia NT, as one of Materia's champions. He is also featured in the rhythm game Theatrhythm Final Fantasy and its sequels, Curtain Call and Final Bar Line, as the main character representing Final Fantasy XII.

== Concept and creation ==
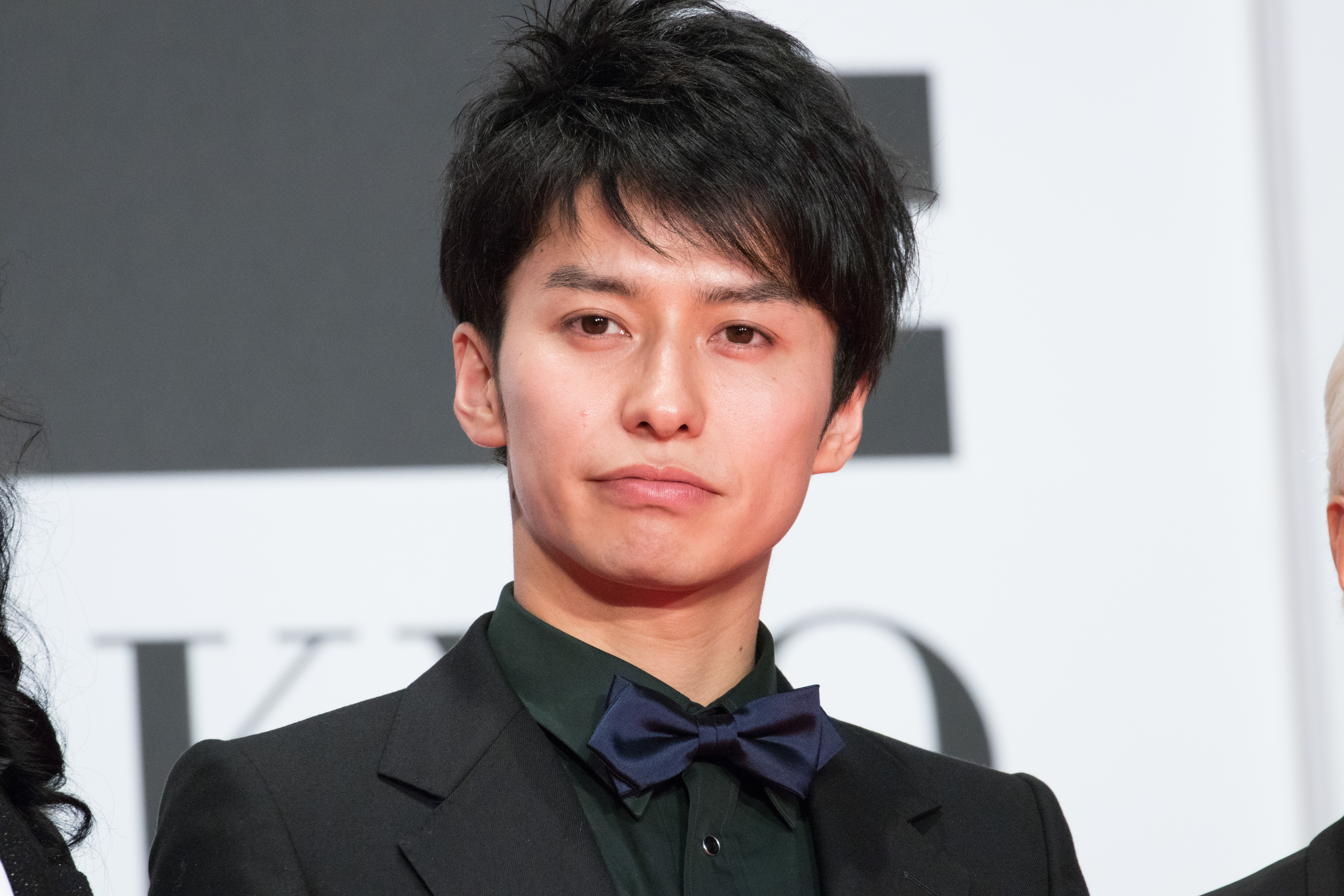
Kouhei Takeda's work as Vaan's voice actor and motion capture affected his characterization.

Yasumi Matsuno added Vaan and Penelo to be male and female avatar characters for the player in Final Fantasy XII. They would see and learn about Ivalice in sync with the player over the course of the game but would not be deeply connected to the story. The development team explained that their previous game, Vagrant Story, which featured a "strong man in his prime" as the protagonist had been unsuccessful and unpopular; the change regarding Final Fantasy XII from a "big and tough" protagonist to a more effeminate one was thus decided after targeting demographics were considered. Although originally conceived as more "rugged", Vaan was changed during development of the game to be more effeminate after "taking into consideration the target demographic". He was designed by character designer Akihiko Yoshida to look Asian. In response to criticism from Western fans regarding Vaan's design executive producer Akitoshi Kawazu noted that while several members from the development team were not feeling Vaan was the right main character owing to his young age, it was common for Japanese RPG to start with an inexperienced characters who grow across the game.

Motomu Toriyama, the writer and director of Final Fantasy XII: Revenant Wings, picked Vaan as his favourite character in the game. In the making of the high-definition of XII, the staff reflected on how "weak" and unreliable he was in the original game. However, they jokingly discussed together that ten years later, he could become more appealing than Balthier, a character Square found appealing. Wanting characters who could appeal to long-term fans and new fans, the team incorporated Vaan and Penelo in Final Fantasy Tactics A2: Grimoire of the Rift. Vaan's appearance, which was supposed to mirror that of Balthier, was suggested by Hiroaki Kato. In Dissidia, he is featured in his Final Fantasy XII design, while alternative ones depict him as in Final Fantasy Tactics A2: Grimoire of the Rift, a new one by Yoshitaka Amano and another one featuring him as sea pirate by Akihiko Yoshida. Another Final Fantasy XII centered-title, only known as Fortress, was in plans by Square Enix but was cancelled; in this video game, Vaan would remain with Penelo and live quiet lives due to the plot being more focused on other characters from the previous games, most notably Ashe, Larsa and Basch.

Vaan was voiced in Final Fantasy XII by Bobby Edner in English and by Kouhei Takeda in Japanese. With the casting of Takeda for the voice acting and motion capture, Vaan became a little less feminine and more "active, upbeat bright and positive" than planned. In the making of the English version, some lines involving Vaan had to be changed for its release but without the loss of the real information. When asked how he compares to other Final Fantasy protagonists, Hideo Minaba said that due in part to being designed by a different character designer than before, he did not feel he could be compared to any other Final Fantasy character. Vaan's inclusion in Dissidia 012 met difficulties due to the fact Takeda was busy with other works to voice him. However, following a Japanese popularity survey, the staff in charge hired Kenshō Ono to replace Takeda as fans wanted him to appear in Dissidia 012. Edner's portrayal of Vaan has been met with mostly positive reception. Cavin Smith praised his acting, stating that he sounds like an actual teenager without sounding whiny. Agustin praised the developers for giving Vaan a voice actor, commenting that it prevents any awkward silences from a silent protagonist. He added however that Vaan is "decidedly quiet", owing to many of the conversations not requiring his input, which Agustin called a "brilliant interactive storytelling device".

== Reception ==
The similarities between Vaan's design and that of Tetsuya Nomura's characters have been criticized, which artist Akihiko Yoshida noted was likely due to the similar colours used. In the book Final Fantasy and Philosophy: The Ultimate Walkthrough, he is described by Greg Littmann as a pick pocket and, unlike many of Final Fantasy's protagonists, lacking in a "sense of honesty and justice". G4 TV editor Greg Orlando described him as "eminently likable" due to the game's focus on "political intrigue" and Vaan trying to understand it all. Cyril Lachel of GamingNexus said that while he was not a fan of Vaan, he was surprised by how his story turned out. 1UP.com editor Andrew Pfister stated that while everyone was expecting to hate what he describes as an "angsty teen", this is "tempered by the presence of Balthier and Basch", two fellow characters. Kotaku's Jason Schreier considered Vaan and Penelo the game's weak points as they compared them with other characters such as Balthier and Asche whose actions were "interesting". Christian Nutt of GamesRadar made fun of the character in an article about the best Final Fantasy heroes stating that Vaan would definitely not be included. Meanwhile, USGamer simply described him as a stereotypical character often seen in anime series aimed at young people. Schreier went harsher, to the point of making a podcast titled "Vaan Really Sucks" as he and his partner interacted about video games. He was compared with other kind heroes in the franchise, including Zidane Tribal from Final Fantasy IX and Tidus from Final Fantasy X, because they appear to be less prominent in the main narrative than other featured characters.

Play.tm editor Andrew Macarthy described Vaan as an "undescribing figure". Eurogamer editor Rob Fahey opined that while "players may initially be somewhat dismayed to find themselves largely following around the cheerful prettyboy Vaan", the game introduces new characters who "fill out the cast superbly". Daily Collegian was harsher to the point of listing him as one of the most useless characters in the franchise due to his lack of appeal most notably in comparison to the party members from his game. Worthplaying editor Agustin described the set-up as being "Dragon Quest-like", and that while he acts as a vehicle for players to view the plot through, he compared him to critically acclaimed characters Crono and Link from the Chrono Trigger and The Legend of Zelda series respectively.

When it came to designs, Vaan was often criticized. GameSpot editor Greg Kasavin described Vaan as the "token androgynous male lead", also describing him as an "Aladdin-type". His design change from Final Fantasy XII to Revenant Wings was criticized by RPGFan editor Patrick Gann, for going from a teenage design to what appears to be the design of a 10-year-old Vaan. In the book La Légende Final Fantasy XII et Ivalice, Rémi Lopez noted that Vaan is a character with a chaotic creation that brought him chance to the throne as the main protagonist without affecting his attributes. Lopez further stated that, despite having the cheerful naiveté specific to many Japanese RPG protagonists, Vaan does not lack certain character depth; even while being a 15-year-old that knows nothing of the outside world, he was able to befriend characters of different ages, who saw in him qualities of a leader despite his youth.
