= Space traveler (disambiguation) =

A space traveler is a person who performs human spaceflight.

Space traveler(s) may also refer to:

- "S.T. the Space Traveler", 1990 episode of Alvin and the Chipmunks (1983)
- Space Travelers: The Animation, 2000 Japanese science fiction and action animated film
- Space Travelers (2000 film), 2000 Japanese action comedy film
- Space Travelers, 1991 reissue of the 1969 American film Marooned, starring Gregory Peck

== See also ==
- Space travel (disambiguation)
