= Space trade =

Economy related to space exploration

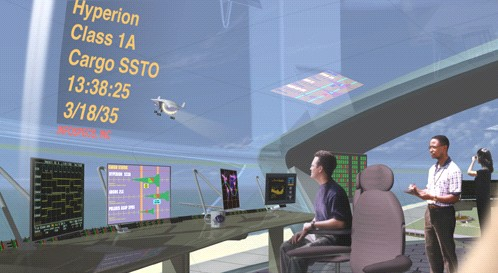
Control room of a future commercial spaceport (concept image by the American National Aeronautics and Space Administration)

Space trade or space commerce is commercial activity involving space travel and trade of resources and products through space-based transportation and infrastructure, particularly in the context of space colonization.

== A motivator for colonization of Mars ==
Several people have considered trade within the Solar System as one of the ways in which the colonization of Mars is both important and can be made self-sufficient. Robert Zubrin, of Lockheed Martin Astronautics, in a paper on the economic viability of colonizing Mars, puts forward interplanetary trade as one way in which a hypothetical Martian colony could become rich, pointing out that the energy relationships between the orbits of Earth, Mars, and the asteroid belt place Mars in a far better position for involvement in any future asteroid mining trade than Earth.

Jim Plaxco, in a paper putting forward the case for colonizing Mars, mentions that Phobos and Deimos can be developed, in the long term, from being short-term testbeds for the techniques of asteroid mining and staging posts for colonization of Mars itself, into key trading posts in interplanetary trade, again because of their favourable position within the Solar System.

== Issues ==
It is theorized that if different locations within the Solar System become inhabited by humans, they would need to transport valuable resources between different planets, moons and asteroids. The asteroid belt is theorized to become a source of valuable ores that may develop into industrial asteroid mining infrastructure, whereas Earth may export hi-tech production. The factor of energy-efficiency of interplanetary transportation may become very important to estimate economic value of a trade route. Although large-scale interplanetary trade remains hypothetical, commercial activity in low Earth orbit has already expanded substantially, with private and multinational spaceflight contributing to a growing space economy.

John Hickman identified the principal obstacle to developing space trade as the distances involved, which will reduce all or nearly all trade to the exchange of intangible goods. That threatens the possibility of conducting business in a genuinely common currency and of enforcing debt agreements incurred by governments.

== Commercial spaceports ==
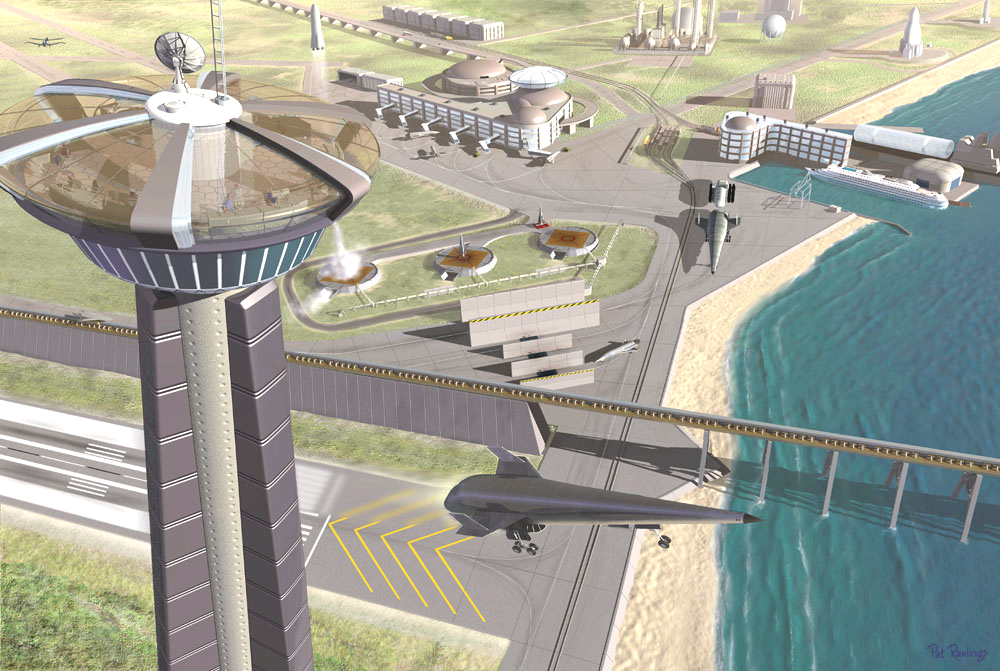
Commercial spaceport concept by NASA

Building high-capacity commercial spaceports may require connection with other modes of transportation, such as railroad or sea, which would make spaceports another dimension of national economy. One analysis of commercial, technical, and logistical concerns for an operating spaceport, formulated by the Spaceport Technology Development Office of NASA, is Vision Spaceport.

== Professional humor ==
The 1978 text The Theory of Interstellar Trade by Nobel Prize winner in economics Paul Krugman was described by the author as something he wrote to cheer himself up when he was an "oppressed assistant professor" caught up in the academic rat race.

Responding to Kugman's paper, the economist Tyler Cowen speculated on how time travel affects time preference discounting.

In 2009, Adam Chodorow, professor of law at the Arizona State University, published an article in the section "Tax Humor" that "seeks to expand on Krugman’s seminal work — and establish my claim to a Nobel Prize — by considering whether income earned in flight should be subject to the federal income tax".

== See also ==
- Helium-3 (although it cannot currently be exploited as an energy source, that may change in the future if fusion power is developed)
- Space-based solar power
- Space manufacturing
- International Institute of Space Commerce
