= Crispin Freeman =

American voice actor

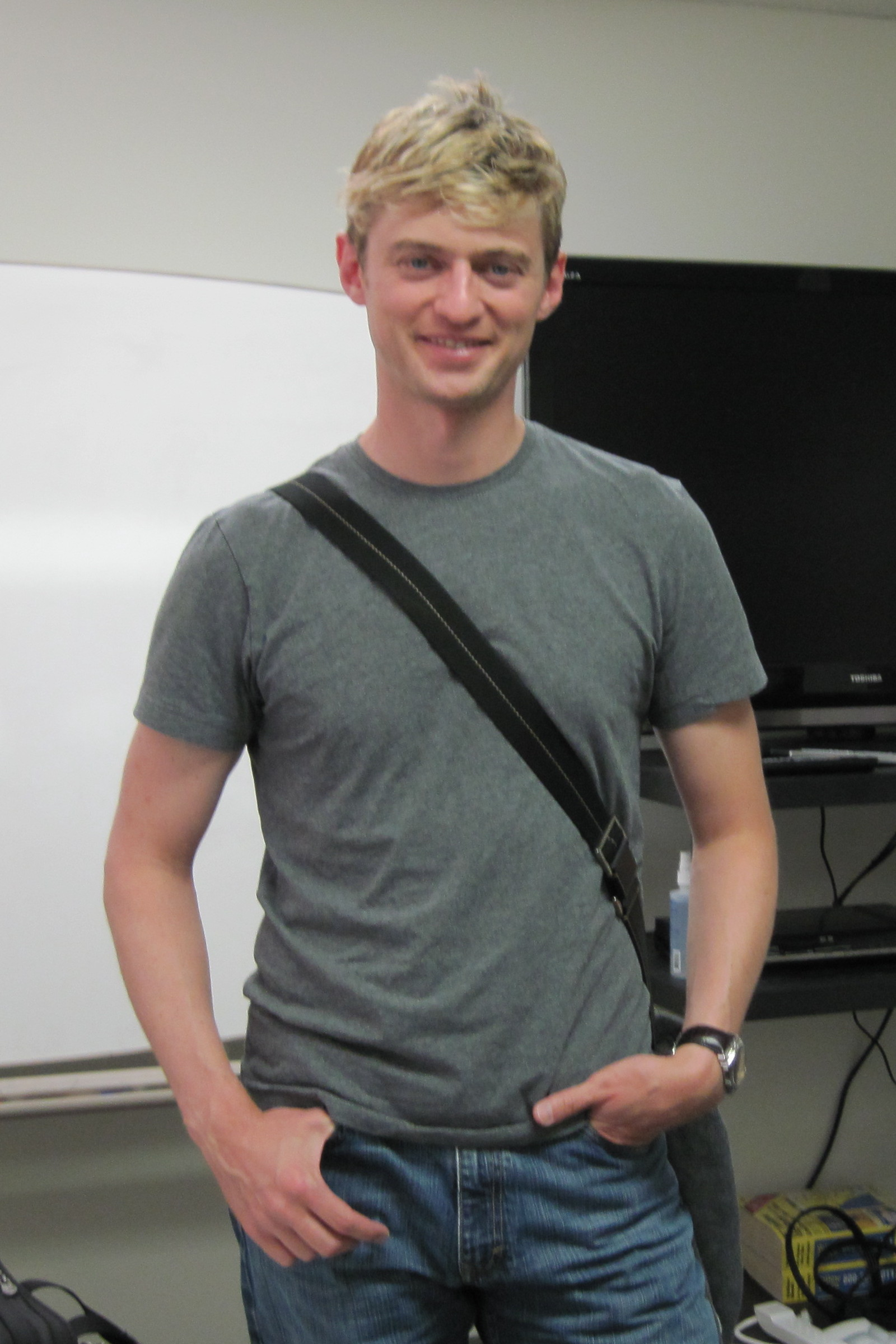
- Freeman in 2009
- Born: Chicago, Illinois, U.S.
- Education: Williams College (BA); Columbia University (MFA)
- Occupations: Voice actor; voice director; screenwriter
- Years active: 1997–present
- Relatives: Cassidy Freeman (sister)
- Website: Official website

Crispin Freeman is an American voice actor, voice director and a screenwriter who is best known for voicing characters in English-language dubs of Japanese, including anime and video games. Some of his prominent anime roles include Zelgadis Graywords in Slayers, Kyon in The Melancholy of Haruhi Suzumiya, Togusa in the Ghost in the Shell franchise, Alucard in Hellsing, Kirei Kotomine in Fate/Zero and Fate/stay night: Unlimited Blade Works, Itachi Uchiha in Naruto, Gyomei Himejima in Demon Slayer: Kimetsu no Yaiba, Hagi in Blood+ and Shizuo Heiwajima in Durarara!!.

== Early life ==
Freeman was born in Chicago. His father is Jewish. He is the oldest of three children. His sister Cassidy is an actress, while his brother Clark is an actor and musician. Freeman graduated from the Latin School of Chicago in 1990 and earned a BA from Williams College, where he majored in theater and minored in computer science. He then earned an MFA in acting from Columbia University and went on to perform on Broadway, at the American Repertory Theater, at the Mark Taper Forum, at Cincinnati's Playhouse in the Park, and at the Williamstown Theater Festival. As a child, he was greatly influenced by anime such as Speed Racer and Battle of the Planets. Casey Kasem voiced the role of his favorite character, Mark of Battle of the Planets, and Freeman even wanted to change his name to Mark at one point. He later discovered Voltron, Star Blazers, and Robotech. He has also stated that the reason he got into the industry was because of the anime The Vision of Escaflowne. He initially got involved in the voice-over industry when a friend of his landed a role in Peacock King.

== Career ==
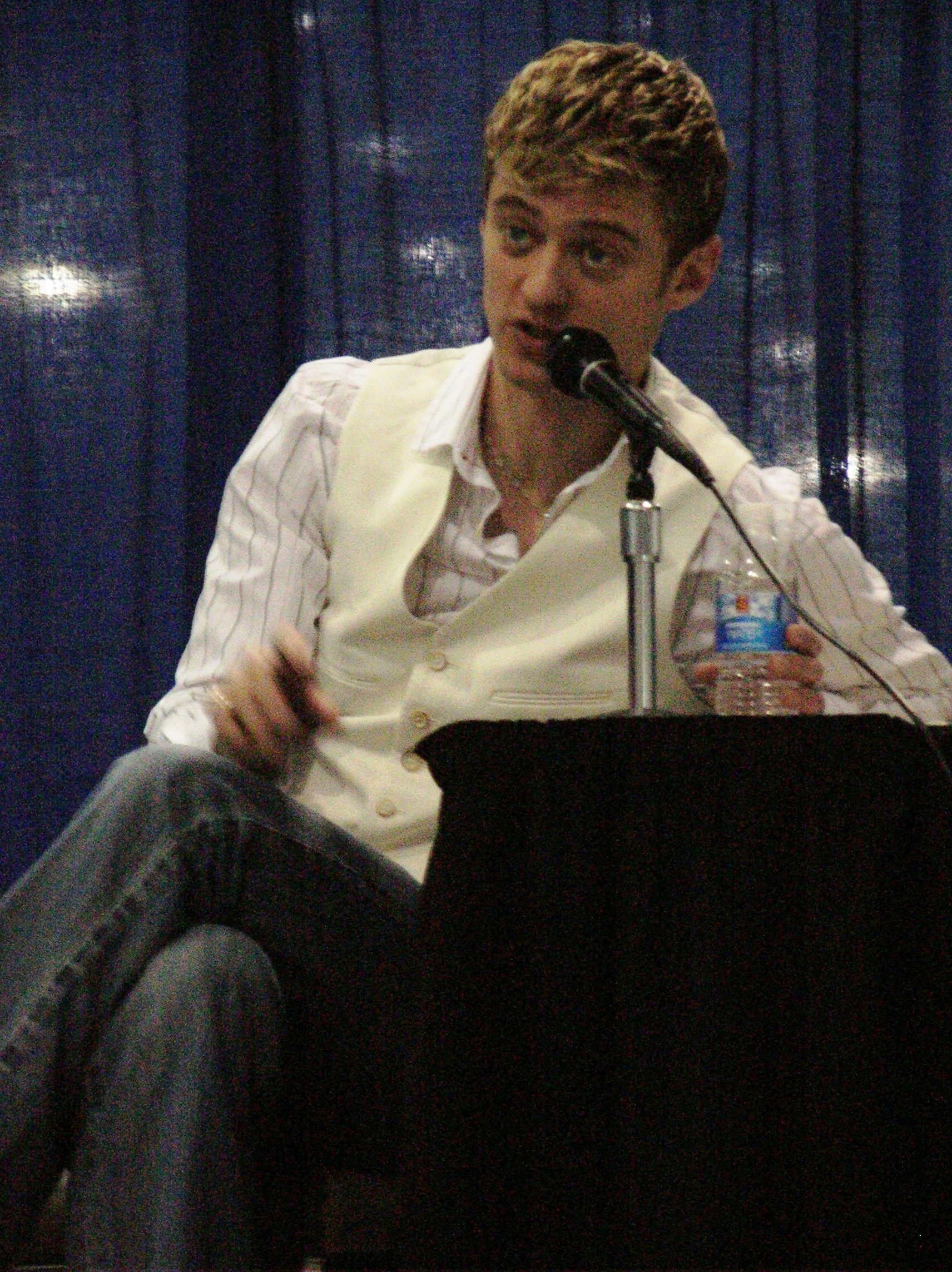
Freeman in May 2009

Knowing Freeman was a big anime fan, a friend suggested he call up Central Park Media (CPM) and apply for a job doing English dubs. When originally approached about dubbing, he initially declined. It was not until he remembered all of the anime shows he watched as a child that he realized that many people are introduced to anime through the English dubbed versions. In 1997, Freeman landed the role of Zelgadis Graywords in Slayers along with Lisa Ortiz, Eric Stuart and Veronica Taylor. He was the second and final voice actor to get the job after Zelgadis' original voice actor, Daniel Cronin, lost contact with CPM after a year-long halt in the dubbing. Years later, he turned to the American animation voice acting grounds.

Freeman has been best known for his work in Marvel Comics-based productions such as The Spectacular Spider-Man, Wolverine and the X-Men and The Avengers: Earth's Mightiest Heroes. He then starred as several versions of Roy Harper in Young Justice for DC Comics and Warner Bros. Since then, Freeman has had various roles throughout his career. He has appeared in many video game titles as memorable characters, such as Albedo from Namco's Xenosaga series, Helios in God of War III and God of War Ragnarök: Valhalla, Haji, Joel the 6th and Van Argeno in Blood+, the main protagonist Baldur in Silicon Knights's Too Human, Breakdown in Transformers: War for Cybertron, the Winter Soldier in Marvel: Ultimate Alliance, and Iron Man in Marvel: Ultimate Alliance 2.

Freeman teaches classes, workshops, and performance lectures in the Los Angeles area. In addition to classes, Freeman has a website called Voice Acting Mastery which includes podcasts and other resources regarding voice acting.

In February 2023, Freeman guest voiced Lieutenant Nolan, an Imperial lieutenant with particular disdain for clones, the commanding officer of Crosshair, in Star Wars: The Bad Batch.

== Filmography ==
=== Anime ===
List of voice performances in anime
Year	Title	Role	Notes	Source
1998	Revolutionary Girl Utena	Touga Kiryuu, Dios		
1998–2000; 2010	Slayers series	Zelgadis Graywords		
1999–2000	The Irresponsible Captain Tylor	Justy Ueki Tylor	Also OVAs	
1999	Record of Lodoss War: Chronicles of the Heroic Knight	Spark		
2000	Virgin Fleet	Mau Sakisaka	OVA	
2000	Photon	The Galactic Emperor	OVA	
2000	Shamanic Princess	Kagetsu	OVA	
2001	Boogiepop Phantom	Masami Saotome, Manticore		
2001	Angel Sanctuary	Rosiel	OVA	
2001	Assemble Insert	Host 1	OVA	
2001	Fencer of Minerva	Sho	OVA	
2001	RG Veda	Taishakuten	OVA	
2002	Now and Then, Here and There	Tabool		
2002	Rurouni Kenshin	Shogo Amakusa		
2002	Hellsing	Alucard		
2002	Cosmo Warrior Zero	Warrius Zero		
2002	I My Me! Strawberry Eggs	Hibiki Amawa (male), Seiko's Father		
2002	Vandread: The Second Stage	Tenmei Uragasumi		
2002	X	Fuma Monou		
2002	Digimon Frontier	Kouichi Kimura, Duskmon, Lowemon, Bakumon, Pipismon		
2003	Argentosoma	1st Lt. Dan Simmons, MORGUE Military Official		
2003	.hack//Liminality	Yuki's Brother, Harald Hoerwick	OVA	
2003	Chobits	Hideki Motosuwa		
2003	R.O.D.: Read or Die	Joker	OVA	
2003	s-CRY-ed	Straight Cougar, Councilmember		
2003	The Big O Season 2	Alan Gabriel		
2003	Geneshaft	Mario Musicanova		
2003	Initial D	Koichiro "Cole" Iketani		
2003	Spirit of Wonder	Jim	OVA	
2003	Witch Hunter Robin	Amon		
2003	Last Exile	Alex Row		
2003	.hack//SIGN	Balmung		
2004	Kikaider 01	Rei / Kikaider 00	OVA	
2004	Wolf's Rain	Tsume		
2004	Kaze no Yojimbo	Genzo Araki, Yamamoto		
2004	.hack//Legend of the Twilight	Balmung		
2004	Rave Master	Shuda, Sieghart		
2004	Angel Tales	Shin		
2004–2005	Ghost in the Shell: Stand Alone Complex	Togusa	Also 2nd GIG	
2004	Please Twins!	Kosei Shimazaki		
2005	Zatch Bell!	Takeshi Kaneyama, Wonrei, Kane, Gustav, Mamoru Iwashima, Albert (Sherry's butler), Oren, Albert (Laila's bookkeeper), additional voices		
2005	Scrapped Princess	Shannon Casull	Voice director, ADR Script Writer	
2005	Planetes	Colin Clifford		
2005	Tenchi Muyo! Ryo-Ohki	Kamikura	3rd OVA series	
2005–2009	Naruto	Itachi Uchiha, Ebisu, Rasa		
2005	Mars Daybreak	Lt. Rich		
2005	IGPX	Bjorn Johannsen		
2006	Eureka Seven	Holland		
2006	Noein: to your other self	Karasu		
2006–2014	Hellsing Ultimate	Alucard	OVA series	
2007	Blood+	Hagi, Van Argeno, Joel Goldschmidt VI		
2007	The Melancholy of Haruhi Suzumiya	Kyon		
2007	Phoenix	Oh-ama-no-miko		
2007	Digimon Data Squad	Thomas H. Norstein		
2008–2009	Code Geass	Jeremiah Gottwald		
2008	Lucky Star	Tomokazu Sugita, Kyon (cosplayer)		
2008	Strait Jacket	Isaac Hammond		
2009–2018	Naruto: Shippuden	Itachi Uchiha, Rasa, Ebisu		
2011	Durarara!!	Shizuo Heiwajima		
2011	Marvel Anime: Wolverine	Tesshin Asano		
2013	Tenkai Knights	Vilius, Slyger		
2013	Fate/Zero	Kirei Kotomine		
2015–2016	Durarara!!×2	Shizuo Heiwajima		
2015	The Disappearance of Nagato Yuki-chan	Kyon		
2015	Fate/stay night: Unlimited Blade Works	Kirei Kotomine	TV series	
2016	God Eater	Soma Schicksal		
2019	Ingress: The Animation	Jack Norman		
2019	Fate/Grand Order - Absolute Demonic Front: Babylonia	King Hassan, Meuniere		
2020–2022	Ghost in the Shell: SAC 2045	Togusa		
2020	Demon Slayer: Kimetsu no Yaiba	Gyomei Himejima		
2020	Yashahime: Princess Half-Demon	Osamu Kirin, Kirinmaru	TV series	
2021	Thus Spoke Kishibe Rohan	Confessor	OVA	
2021	The Promised Neverland	Peter Ratri	Season 2	
2023	Pokémon Horizons: The Series	Friede		
2025	Sakamoto Days	Kanaguri		

=== Animation ===
List of voice performances in animation
Year	Title	Role	Notes	Source
2006	W.I.T.C.H.	Raphael Sylla	Episode: "Z is for Zenith"	
2008–2009	The Spectacular Spider-Man	Max Dillon / Electro, Thug #1	6 episodes	
2009	Wolverine and the X-Men	Multiple Man, Maverick		
2010–2013, 2019–2021	Young Justice	Roy Harper / Arsenal / Red Arrow, Jim Harper, Will Harper, Captain Boomerang, various voices		
2010	Scooby-Doo! Mystery Incorporated	Howard E. Robertson, Rhino, Ben, Cook	Episode: "The Shrieking Madness"	
2012	The Avengers: Earth's Mightiest Heroes	Scott Lang / Ant-Man	Episode: "To Steal an Ant-Man"	
2012	Scooby-Doo! Haunted Holidays	Fabian Menkle	TV special	
2014–2015 2017	Steven Universe	Doug Maheswaran, Male Nurse	3 episodes	
2015	Wabbit	Old Man #1, Dust Bunny	2 episodes	
2016–2018	Justice League Action	J'onn J'onzz / Martian Manhunter		
2016	Adventure Time	Turtle Prince, Ice President	Episode: "Five Short Tables"	
2017	All Hail King Julien	Alex	Episode: "The End is Here"	
2017	Spider-Man	Mysterio, Spot	Episode: "Bring On the Bad Guys"	
2023	Star Wars: The Bad Batch	Lieutenant Nolan	Episode: "The Outpost"	
2026	X-Men '97	Maverick	Episode: "Weapon X, Lies, and DVDs"	

=== Films ===
List of voice performances in feature films
Year	Title	Role	Notes	Source
1998	Grave of the Fireflies	Doctors, Old Man	English dub	
2001	Adolescence of Utena	Touga Kiryuu	English dub	
2001	Night on the Galactic Railroad	Campanella	English dub	
2001	Space Travelers	Hayabusa "Jay" Jetter	English dub	
2002	Cowboy Bebop: The Movie	Operator	English dub	
2003	Sakura Wars: The Movie	Brent Furlong	Credited as Joseph McDougall, English dub	
2004	Slayers Premium	Zelgadis Graywords	English dub	
2004	Ghost in the Shell 2: Innocence	Togusa	English dub	
2005	Howl's Moving Castle	Prince Justin / Turnip Head	English dub	
2006	Final Fantasy VII: Advent Children	Rude	English dub	
2006	Ice Age: The Meltdown	Various characters		
2007	Ghost in the Shell: Stand Alone Complex - Solid State Society	Togusa	English dub	
2008	Resident Evil: Degeneration	Frederic Downing		
2010	The Disappearance of Haruhi Suzumiya	Kyon	English dub	
2015	Tiger & Bunny: The Rising	Virgil	English dub	
2017	Teen Titans: The Judas Contract	Roy Harper / Speedy		
2018	Fate/stay night: Heaven's Feel I. presage flower	Kirei Kotomine	English dub	
2018	Mirai	Yukko (Human Form)	English dub	
2019	Promare	Kray Foresight	English dub	
2019	Fate/stay night: Heaven's Feel II. lost butterfly	Kirei Kotomine	English dub	
2021	Demon Slayer: Kimetsu no Yaiba – The Movie: Mugen Train	Gyomei Himejima	English dub	
2021	Fate/stay night: Heaven's Feel III. spring song	Kirei Kotomine	English dub	
2024	Gurren Lagann The Movie: The Lights in the Sky are Stars	Anti-Spiral	English dub	
2025	Demon Slayer: Kimetsu no Yaiba – The Movie: Infinity Castle	Gyomei Himejima	English dub	

=== Video games ===
List of voice performances in video games
Year	Title	Role	Notes	Source
2003	.hack series	Balmung	Mutation, Outbreak, Quarantine	
2003–2006	Xenosaga series	Albedo Piazolla, Gaignun Kukai		
2003	Tales of Symphonia	Regal Bryant		
2004	Seven Samurai 20XX	Ein		
2004	World of Warcraft	Thalen Songweaver, Commander Lindon, Vindicator Maraad, Il'gynoth the Heart of Corruption		
2005	Rave Master	Shuda, Sieg Hart		
2005	Soulcalibur III	Siegfried Schtauffen		
2006	Kingdom Hearts II	Setzer Gabbiani, Will Turner		
2006	Pirates of the Caribbean: The Legend of Jack Sparrow	Will Turner		
2006	Baten Kaitos Origins	Heughes		
2006	Justice League Heroes	Superman		
2006–2016	Naruto series	Itachi Uchiha, Rasa, Ebisu		
2006	Gothic 3	The Nameless Hero		
2006–2007	.hack//G.U. series	Sakaki, Azure Balmung	Rebirth, Reminisce, Redemption	
2006	Marvel: Ultimate Alliance	Winter Soldier		
2006	Metal Gear Solid: Portable Ops	High Officer A		
2007	300: March to Glory	Leonidas, Persian Champion		
2007	Rogue Galaxy	Gale Dorban, Jaus		
2007	Armored Core 4	Unseel, Defense Force		
2007	Digimon World Data Squad	Thomas H. Norstein, Sleipmon		
2007	Neverwinter Nights 2: Mask of the Betrayer	Gannayev-of-Dreams, Khai Khmun		
2008	Harvey Birdman: Attorney at Law	Myron Reducto		
2008	Crisis Core: Final Fantasy VII	Rude		
2008	Metal Gear Solid 4: Guns of the Patriots	Enemy Soldiers		
2008	Rise of the Argonauts	Achilles		
2009	Madagascar: Escape 2 Africa	Alex		
2009	The Lord of the Rings: Conquest	Legolas		
2009	Watchmen: The End Is Nigh	Doctor Manhattan		
2009	Marvel: Ultimate Alliance 2	Iron Man, Titanium Man		
2009	MagnaCarta 2	Alex		
2010	White Knight Chronicles	Setti, Grazel		
2010	Clash of the Titans	Prokopion, Belo, Soldiers		
2010	Valkyria Chronicles II	Zeri		
2010	Transformers: War for Cybertron	Breakdown		
2010	God of War III	Helios		
2011	Marvel Super Hero Squad Online	Bullseye, Ghost Rider, Punisher		
2011	White Knight Chronicles II	Setti, Grazel		
2011	Resistance 3	Charlie Tent, Winston (Smoking Man), Leroy		
2012	Diablo III	Wizard (Male)		
2013	Marvel Heroes	Pyro, Gorgon, Ka-Zar		
2013	God of War: Ascension	Bliss King, Civilian, Slave, Sailor		
2013	Metal Gear Rising: Revengeance	Sundowner		
2013	Madagascar 3: Europe's Most Wanted: The Video Game	Alex		
2013	Batman: Arkham Origins	Firefly, GCPD Speaker		
2014	Bayonetta 2	Balder		
2014	Lightning Returns: Final Fantasy XIII	Garrett, Breezy Diner, Researcher		
2014	Tenkai Knights: Brave Battle	Vilius, Slyger, A.I. Guidance System		
2014	Call of Duty: Advanced Warfare	A.S.T.		
2014	Metal Gear Solid V: Ground Zeroes	Soldiers / Extras		
2014	Destiny	Guardian: Awoken Male		
2014; 2017	Kingdom Hearts HD 2.5 Remix	Setzer Gabbiani, Will Turner	Archived	
2015	Batman: Arkham Knight	Firefly		
2015	Metal Gear Solid V: The Phantom Pain	Soldiers / Extras		
2016	Fallout 4: Far Harbor	Brooks, Andre Michaud, William Moseley		
2016	Overwatch	Winston		
2016	Seven Knights	Rudy		Facebook
2016	Star Ocean: Integrity and Faithlessness	Victor Oakville		
2016	World of Final Fantasy	Captain, Man in Rags	English version	
2017	Horizon Zero Dawn	Helis		
2018	Onmyoji	Ootengu, Youko, Mannendake		
2018	Metal Gear Survive	Player, MB Soldiers		
2018	Epic Seven	Charles		
2018	Marvel Powers United VR	Loki		
2018	Lego DC Super-Villains	Firefly, Arsenal, Riddler Goon		
2018–2020	Destiny 2	Guardian: Awoken Male, Shin Malphur		
2019	Kingdom Hearts III	Will Turner		
2019	Metro Exodus	Admiral, Soldier		
2019	Days Gone	Mark "Cope" Copeland		
2019	Judgment	Masaharu Kaito		
2019	Magic: The Gathering Arena	Sorin Markov		
2019	Marvel Ultimate Alliance 3: The Black Order	Gorgon		
2019	Marvel Dimension of Heroes	Loki	Augmented reality game for mobile devices	
2019	The Outer Worlds	Charles Rockwell		
2021	Dungeons & Dragons: Dark Alliance	Drizzt Do'Urden		
2021	Lost Judgment	Masaharu Kaito		
2021	Demon Slayer: Kimetsu no Yaiba – The Hinokami Chronicles	Gyomei Himejima		
2022	Chocobo GP	Adelbert Steiner, Maduin		
2022	Elex 2	Tilas, Xander		
2023	Call of Duty: Modern Warfare II	Alucard		
2023	God of War Ragnarok	Helios	Valhalla DLC	
2023	Loop8: Summer of Gods	Max Baldur		
2023	Like a Dragon Gaiden: The Man Who Erased His Name	Masaharu Kaito		
2023	DreamWorks All-Star Kart Racing	Alex		
2024	Granblue Fantasy: Relink	Gallanza		
2024	Disney Speedstorm	Will Turner		
2025	Like a Dragon: Pirate Yakuza in Hawaii	Masaharu Kaito		

=== Other dubbing ===
List of voice performances in other dubbing
Year	Title	Role	Notes	Source
2005	Oldboy	Lee Woo-jin		

=== Live-action ===
List of appearances in film and television
Year	Title	Role	Notes	Source
2008	Adventures in Voice Acting	Himself		
