= Setzer Gabbiani =

Fictional character in Final Fantasy VI

- Final Fantasy character
- Artwork of Setzer by Yoshitaka Amano for Final Fantasy VI
- First game: Final Fantasy VI (1994)
- Created by: Tetsuya Nomura
- Designed by: Tetsuya Nomura (preliminary); Yoshitaka Amano; Kazuko Shibuya
- Voiced by: EN: Crispin Freeman; JA: Ryōtarō Okiayu

Setzer Gabbiani (Japanese: セッツァー・ギャッビアーニ, Hepburn: Settsā Gyabbiāni) is a character introduced in the 1994 role-playing video game Final Fantasy VI by Square Enix. A gambler with an airship casino, he originally plots to kidnap the starlet of an opera, before he is coerced into joining the protagonists in their quest to stop the game's Gestahlian Empire. Created by Tetsuya Nomura, he was based on a character class he had originally planned for the game's preceding title, Final Fantasy V. He has since appeared in other titles related to the Final Fantasy franchise, including Kingdom Hearts II, where he is voiced by Crispin Freeman in English, and Ryōtarō Okiayu in Japanese.

Reviewers regarded Setzer as one of the best characters in the game due to his personality and nature, and unique among the series due to being driven by his own desires and ambitions. However this has also earned him some criticism, seen as a "scumbag" by some reviewers, albeit one that improves once he joins the rest of the game's playable cast. Particular praise was given to his story in the game's second half, where he shares a personal tragedy, a moment that some saw as providing much-needed humanization for his character.

== Appearances ==
Setzer Gabbiani is a character in the 1994 Square Enix video game Final Fantasy VI. Fighting using dice, darts and thrown playing cards, he is a renowned gambler and owner of the Blackjack, an airship-based casino. The protagonists, in need of an airship, discover that he plans to kidnap the star of an upcoming opera. Realizing one of the women in their group, Celes, resembles the starlet, she poses as her to entrap Setzer. When he arrives, she makes a coin-flip wager with him that she'll go with him if he wins, and if he loses he joins the protagonists in their opposition of the game's Gestahlian Empire. Setzer agrees and loses the wager, though upon discovering it was a two-headed coin joins the group regardless, both due to the harm the Empire is doing to his lifestyle and respecting Celes' willingness to use underhanded tactics.

However, at the conclusion of the game's first half the world has been devastated, the party separated, and the Blackjack destroyed. Celes finds Setzer drinking heavily in despair, but encourages him to keep going. He takes the group to the tomb of his friend Darril and reveals his past as they descend the staircase into it: originally, the two of them used their airships to compete to be the fastest people in the world. However, her ship crashed after a test flight, and Setzer recovered it and rebuilt it at the site of her grave. Her ship taking flight once more with Setzer in command, the group proceeds to try and find the rest of their allies to take on the game's main antagonist, Kefka.

In other games, Setzer appears as a playable character in Final Fantasy Brave Exvius, Final Fantasy Record Keeper, and Dissidia Final Fantasy Opera Omnia. He also appears in Kingdom Hearts II as the reigning champion of the false Twilight Town's Struggle tournament, where he fights the character Roxas. He can also challenge Sora in the real Twilight Town in an optional sidequest. In Kingdom Hearts, he is voiced by Ryōtarō Okiayu in Japanese and Crispin Freeman in English, with Okiayu reprising the role for Opera Omnia. Outside of video games, cards representing Setzer have been produced for the Final Fantasy Trading Card Game and Magic: The Gathering.

== Conception and design ==
Final Fantasy VI was developed with the mindset that none of the playable cast was the protagonist, and that each of them were equally the "main character". The cast of characters were selected from submissions from across the development team, with artist Tetsuya Nomura contributing the character based on a character concept he had wanted to use previously. Once the cast was selected, each individual would write their character's story, with Yoshinori Kitase balancing the plot as things developed.

Standing 175 centimetres (5 ft 9 in) tall, an early draft of the character's appearance was drawn by Nomura, while Yoshitaka Amano was commissioned to design the characters from the brief outlines provided. Given full creative freedom, Amano wanted to make "real" and "alive" characters, though with consideration for their representation in-game as small computer sprites. However, according to series creator Hironobu Sakaguchi and pixel artist Kazuko Shibuya, most of the characters were designed by Shibuya first as sprites. Though Shibuya acted as an intermediary between Amano and the development team, this resulted in discrepancies between Amano's concepts and the game itself. Setzer appears as a pale man with long white hair, a black suit with lavender boots, and a black jacket with a gold trim. He additionally has a blue sash around his waist, and a white ascot on his neck. His face and body are heavily scarred, due to "accidents on the airship" but also to reflect the difficulties of his life as a gambler.

The Gambler concept was originally a character class intended for Final Fantasy V, however the team felt it had too much "individuality". When work began on VI Nomura felt it was more suitable there as the game's theme was to highlight the individuality of the cast. In terms of personality, he is described as someone calm in almost any situation and in control of their emotions, though tends to use "clumsy phrasing", sometimes on purpose. Additionally they wanted Setzer to put heavy emphasis on his sense of fashion, and desire to have a unique look, similar in attitude to a rock and roll musician. One particular way to illustrate this was with a Bandana item the character has in his inventory, despite being unable to equip it; the team intended it as environmental storytelling, where Setzer, upon seeing the character Locke also wearing a bandana, refuses to wear it again to not share the same style.

Setzer's appearance in Kingdom Hearts II was a last minute change, as scenario writer Kazushige Nojima originally planned to use the character Rufus Shinra from Final Fantasy VII. But as the scenes were already being completed, Nomura stated he felt they were using too many characters from VII, and suggested using Setzer instead. Nojima was unfamiliar with the character, but agreed nonetheless.

== Promotion and reception ==
A keychain figure based on his chibi artwork was also produced by Bandai, as part of a series to promote the release of Final Fantasy VI. In 2014, added an outfit to Final Fantasy XIV for male players that would change their appearance to match Setzer's, as part of the game's "Gold Saucer" event.

Setzer received mostly positive reception since his debut. Dave Smith of IGN considered him the best of the male protagonists in Final Fantasy VI, stating he had the "most crucial of qualities in a hero, an unshakable sense of humor" in light of how he joins the party in the game. RPGamer's Luis Mauricio praised him as being "different and unexpected", an aspect he felt made him stand out amongst VI's cast as a whole. Praising his role in the plot and his choice of weapons, he felt Setzer was a character "propelled by adventure" with a distinct look that tied well to his gambler image, adding "He may be vain and proud, but he somehow manages to be utterly fascinating." Tom Slattery, who oversaw the re-localization of Final Fantasy VI for the Game Boy Advance, compared him to Star Wars hero Han Solo, emphasizing that while Setzer doesn't necessarily want to join the party's rebellion, his hatred for the empire and "hopes of getting the girl" were particular motivations he saw in both characters. Meanwhile, Setzer's motivations being in response to the loss of Darill and the subsequent return to her tomb in the game's second half have been praised as some of the game's best aspects.

In the book The Legend of Final Fantasy VI, Pierre Maugein described him as "the embodiment of the non-conformist character showcasing his complete freedom" despite his gambling addiction. He added that while the character had known tragedy like most of the cast, unlike them he was more trying to escape his past. Maugein felt his hedonism in an effort to "feel alive" made him a unique character in the Final Fantasy series. He noted specifically the moment where he wagers his freedom against taking Celes for himself as an example of this; even though he loses the rigged coin flip, his excitement is satisfied. Maugein added that while initially Setzer only joins with the protagonists not out of a care for the world but because the Empire is a threat to his wealth, he appears to use the party to define a new motivation to live for himself, particularly after he overcomes his mourning for Darill.

While Setzer's main theme reflects a daredevil persona, its 'Epitaph' reprise creates a slow, somber mood through the use of guitar, and helps define the facets of his character.

Sebastian Deken in his book examining Final Fantasy VI and its themes described him as "objectively a scumbag", citing his involvement with the Empire, his focus on money, and the implications of his ambitions to kidnap Celes. However, he acknowledged that once he joins with the group he does reform somewhat, putting his prized possessions and even his body on the line for them, something he felt illustrated Setzer's growth and atonement for his past character. He expressed the scene of him reminiscing about Darill was less about necessity for the plot, as he saw it entirely reasonable to build another airship on his own, and instead a story element used to humanize him somewhat, leaving him still a scumbag, but one "with a heart". The staff of RPGFan shared this sentiment in a podcast retrospective of the game, stating that prior to it while he had little characterization out of seeming like a womanizer, it provided a "powerful and moving" moment to his character as the descent down the staircase into the tomb became symbolic of Setzer's own descent into his memories.

When examining the iterations of his musical theme, Deken felt that played further into the aforementioned humanizing aspect, particularly its use during the Darill memory sequence. Describing it as "Williamsesque" and "sonic adrenaline", he stated this was expressed with its trumpet melody and "quick moving" strings, painting Setzer as a daredevil. However its reuse as "Epitaph", a slower paced rendition with slightly altered rhythm as the heroes descend into the tomb, felt more similar Led Zeppelin's "Stairway to Heaven". Deken added it presented a tonal shift for Setzer's character, with his brashness becoming tender while his cavalier solemn, and something Deken felt he "desperately needs" as a character in light of his other aspects. Patrick Holleman in the book Reverse Design: Final Fantasy VI meanwhile described it as a "charmingly nostalgic piece that, much like the feeling of nostalgia, doesn't resolve", praising composer Nobuo Uematsu's use of musical chords for this effect. He further felt that for as much personality as it gave Setzer, he considered it a shame this variation of his theme only played once during the course of the game.
