= Kingdom Hearts II =

2005 video game

- Cover artwork featuring the game's protagonists (Note: Main artwork used for box art in all regions. The box art's design, such as the border texture and background color, vary between regions.)
- Developer: Square Enix Product Development Division 1
- Publisher: Square Enix
- Director: Tetsuya Nomura
- Producers: Shinji Hashimoto; Yoshinori Kitase
- Programmers: Hiroshi Harata; Kentaro Yasui
- Artists: Takayuki Odachi; Tetsuya Nomura
- Writer: Kazushige Nojima
- Composer: Yoko Shimomura
- Series: Kingdom Hearts
- Platform: PlayStation 2
- Release: JP: December 22, 2005; NA: March 28, 2006; AU: September 28, 2006; EU: September 29, 2006; Final Mix: JP: March 29, 2007
- Genres: Action role-playing, hack and slash
- Mode: Single-player

Kingdom Hearts II (Note: Japanese: キングダムハーツII, Hepburn: Kingudamu Hātsu Tsū) is a 2005 action role-playing game developed and published by Square Enix in collaboration with Buena Vista Games for the PlayStation 2. The game is a sequel to Kingdom Hearts, and like the original game, combines characters and settings from Disney films with those of Square Enix's Final Fantasy series. An expanded re-release of the game featuring new and additional content, Kingdom Hearts II Final Mix, (Note: キングダム ハーツII ファイナル ミックス, Kingudamu Hātsu Tsū Fainaru Mikkusu) was released exclusively in Japan in March 2007. The Final Mix version of the game was later remastered in high definition and released globally as part of the Kingdom Hearts HD 2.5 Remix collection for the PlayStation 3, PlayStation 4, Xbox One, Windows, and Nintendo Switch.

Kingdom Hearts II is the second main installment in the Kingdom Hearts series, and the third game overall, taking place one year after the events of Kingdom Hearts: Chain of Memories. Sora, the protagonist of the first two games, returns to search for his lost friends while battling the sinister Organization XIII, a group of antagonists previously introduced in Chain of Memories. Like previous games, Kingdom Hearts II features a large cast of characters from Disney and Square Enix properties.

Concepts for Kingdom Hearts II began during the end of development of Kingdom Hearts Final Mix, with the game entering full development in 2003 and being announced at Tokyo Game Show 2003. Most of the first game's development team returned, including director Tetsuya Nomura, with the game being developed concurrently with Chain of Memories. In developing Kingdom Hearts II, the development team sought to address user feedback from the first game, give the player more freedom and options in combat and present a deeper and more mature plot.

The game was released to a very positive reaction from critics; earning several awards upon release. Reviewers praised the visuals, soundtrack, voice acting, and emotional weight, but assessments of the gameplay and narrative were mixed. In both Japan and North America, it shipped more than one million copies within weeks of its release, with over four million worldwide by April 2007. It has been cited as one of the greatest video games of all time.

== Gameplay ==
While navigating the 3D environment, the player uses the on-screen command menu (bottom left) to control Sora's actions and can monitor his health, magic, and drive gauges (bottom right). Shown is Sora battling Sephiroth in the Radiant Garden world.

The gameplay of Kingdom Hearts II is similar to the action RPG and hack and slash gameplay of the first Kingdom Hearts game, though developers made an effort to address some of the complaints of no map and camera bugs with the previous game. The player directly controls Sora from a third-person camera angle, though it is possible to switch to a first-person perspective by pressing the Select button. Most of the gameplay occurs on interconnected field maps where battles take place. The game is driven by a linear progression from one story event to the next, usually told via cutscenes, though there are numerous side-quests available that provide bonuses to characters.

Like many traditional role-playing video games, Kingdom Hearts II features an experience point system which determines character development. As enemies are defeated, the player and allies gain experience to "level up", allowing them to grow stronger and gain access to new abilities.

Combat in Kingdom Hearts II takes place in real-time and involves hack and slash elements with button presses which initiate attacks by the on-screen character. A role-playing game menu on the screen's bottom left, similar to those found in Final Fantasy games, provides other combat options, such as using magic or items, summoning beings to assist in battle, or executing combination attacks with other party members. A new feature is the "Reaction Command", special enemy-specific attacks that are triggered when the player presses the triangle button at the correct time during battle. Reaction Commands can be used to defeat regular enemies or avoid damage, and are sometimes necessary to complete a boss battle. In addition to the main character, two party members are usually present who also participate in combat. Although these characters are computer-controlled, the player is allowed to customize their behavior to a certain extent through the menu screen, such as attacking the same enemy Sora targets.

In response to criticism, the "Gummi Ship" feature of the first game was re-imagined to be "more enjoyable". Although retaining its basic purpose of travel, the system was completely redone to resemble a combination of rail shooter and "Disney theme park ride". In the world map, the player now controls the Gummi Ship from a top-down view to fly to the world they wish to enter. Worlds are no longer open from the beginning—the player must unlock the routes to them by entering a new level, controlling the ship from a third-person point of view, and battling enemy ships. After the route is opened, travel to the world is unimpeded, unless it is blocked again due to a plot-related event. The player may also gain new Gummi Ships from completing routes, which is also a new feature.

=== Drive Gauge ===
A new feature is a meter—known as the "Drive Gauge"—that allows Sora to transform into a "Drive Form" or to summon a special character. While in a Drive Form, Sora bonds with party members to become more powerful and acquire different attributes; all but two Forms also allow the use of two Keyblades. When a Drive is executed, Sora's combat statistics are heightened. Drive Forms also give Sora new abilities that can be used in normal form, called "Growth Abilities". Sora's first two Drive Forms only combine power with one party member; later-obtained Drive Forms require him to bond with both party members. When allies are used in a Drive, they are temporarily removed from battle for its duration. Unlike the HP and MP gauges, the Drive Gauge is not refilled at save points.

Like in the first game, Sora can summon a Disney character to aid him in battle. Summons will replace the two computer-controlled characters and fight alongside Sora for as long as the Drive Gauge allows, or until Sora's HP runs out. Instead of being limited to only one action, Summons now have a menu of their own and are capable of performing solo or cooperative actions with Sora, which are performed by pressing the triangle button. The Summon ability and each Drive Form are leveled up separately and by different criteria; obtaining higher levels allows for extended use and in the case of Drive Forms, access to new abilities.

== Plot ==
=== Setting ===
Kingdom Hearts II begins one year after the events of Kingdom Hearts and Chain of Memories. The game's setting is a collection of various levels (referred to in-game as "worlds") that the player progresses through. As in the first game, the player can travel to various Disney-based locales, along with original worlds specifically created for the series. While Disney-based worlds were primarily derived from the Disney animated features canon in the first game, Kingdom Hearts II introduces worlds that are based on live-action franchises: Pirates of the Caribbean and Tron. Each world varies in appearance and setting, depending on the Disney film on which it is based. The graphics of the world and characters are meant to resemble the artwork and style of the environments and characters from their respective Disney films. Each world is disconnected from the others and exists separately; with few exceptions, players travel from one world to another via a Gummi Ship.

Some worlds featured in the previous games reappear, but with new and expanded areas. New worlds are also introduced, with the Land of Dragons being based on Mulan, Beast's Castle on Beauty and the Beast, Timeless River on Steamboat Willie among other shorts from the Mickey Mouse film series, Port Royal on Pirates of the Caribbean: The Curse of the Black Pearl, Pride Lands on The Lion King, and Space Paranoids on Tron. Twilight Town, an original world first seen in Chain of Memories, has a greater role as the introductory world. The World That Never Was is a new world that serves as the headquarters of Organization XIII.

=== Characters ===
The three protagonists are Sora, a 15-year-old boy chosen as a wielder of the Keyblade—a mystical key-shaped weapon that can combat darkness; Donald Duck, the court magician of Disney Castle; and Goofy, the captain of the Disney Castle guards. Both Donald and Goofy are under orders from their missing king, Mickey Mouse, to accompany Sora and his Keyblade. Other original characters include Riku, who is briefly playable at the game's climax, and Kairi, who are Sora's friends from his home world of Destiny Islands; Roxas, a boy who can also wield the Keyblade and is playable in the game's beginning sequence; Naminé, a girl with the power to manipulate memories; and DiZ, a man clad in red robes with a vendetta against Organization XIII, and is later revealed to be Ansem the Wise, Xehanort's mentor.

As in the previous games, characters from both Disney and Square Enix works appear. While some return from Kingdom Hearts, additional Disney characters are introduced, such as Scrooge McDuck and several characters from Disney films in their home worlds. Pete appears as a persistent enemy who works with the resurrected Maleficent. Nearly twenty characters from Final Fantasy games appear, notably Auron from Final Fantasy X, Squall Leonhart from Final Fantasy VIII, and Cloud Strife, Sephiroth, and Tifa Lockhart from Final Fantasy VII. Other new characters to the series are Vivi Ornitier from Final Fantasy IX, Seifer Almasy from Final Fantasy VIII, and Setzer Gabbiani from Final Fantasy VI.

The worlds that Sora explores often have an optional party character from the film which the world is based on. These party members include Fa Mulan, a woman who passes as a man to take her ailing father's place in the army; Jack Sparrow, a pirate who seeks to reclaim his ship, the Black Pearl; Simba, a self-exiled lion and the rightful king of the Pride Lands; and Tron, a security program in Hollow Bastion's computer network who seeks to end the dictatorship of the Master Control Program.

Organization XIII, a group of powerful Nobodies—the "empty shells" left over when a strong-hearted person becomes a Heartless—introduced in Chain of Memories, is established as the primary group of antagonists early on. Xemnas, the leader of Organization XIII, serves as the main antagonist and final boss of the game. Villains unique to the worlds are prevalent and are often presented as challenges that Sora's group must overcome.

=== Story ===
Sora, Donald, and Goofy have spent the past year in suspended animation to restore their lost memories. Meanwhile, Roxas, Sora's Nobody, is unknowingly trapped in a virtual simulation of Twilight Town created by DiZ to protect him from Organization XIII until Sora awakens. DiZ's plan is threatened when Nobodies led by Axel, Roxas's former friend in Organization XIII, infiltrate the virtual town to retrieve him. Roxas repels the Nobodies before merging with Sora. After awakening, Sora, Donald, and Goofy meet King Mickey and Yen Sid, who send them on a new journey to find Riku and uncover Organization XIII's plans. Meanwhile, Maleficent is resurrected and reunites with Pete to continue her quest for power.

Sora travels to both familiar and unfamiliar worlds, resolving conflicts caused by Organization XIII, the Heartless, and various local villains. During a visit to Hollow Bastion, the group reunites with Mickey, who reveals that the "Ansem" they previously defeated was an impostor who was actually the Heartless of a man named Xehanort, and that Xehanort's Nobody, Xemnas, leads Organization XIII. The Organization reveals that it seeks to create its own Kingdom Hearts from the hearts Sora releases from defeated Heartless, believing its power will restore the members' lost hearts. They also abduct Kairi to use as leverage against Sora. As Sora revisits the worlds to resolve lingering problems while searching for a route to Organization XIII's stronghold in the World That Never Was, he is secretly aided by a hooded figure he believes to be Riku.

Following a lead, Sora, Donald, and Goofy travel through Twilight Town to reach the World That Never Was, where Axel sacrifices himself to help them proceed. Sora reunites with Kairi and Riku, learning that Riku assumed the appearance of Xehanort's Heartless after unleashing his power to subdue Roxas. Mickey encounters DiZ, who reveals himself to be the real Ansem, Xehanort's mentor. Ansem uses a device to dissipate some of Kingdom Hearts' power, but it overloads and explodes, apparently killing him while restoring Riku's original appearance. At the Castle That Never Was, Sora and his allies defeat Xemnas, who draws on the remnants of Kingdom Hearts during the battle. During the battle, Sora and Riku become trapped in the Realm of Darkness, where they discover a letter from Kairi that opens a portal back to the Destiny Islands, allowing them to reunite with their friends. In a post-credits scene, Sora, Kairi, and Riku receive a letter from Mickey, the contents of which are hidden from the player.

== Development ==
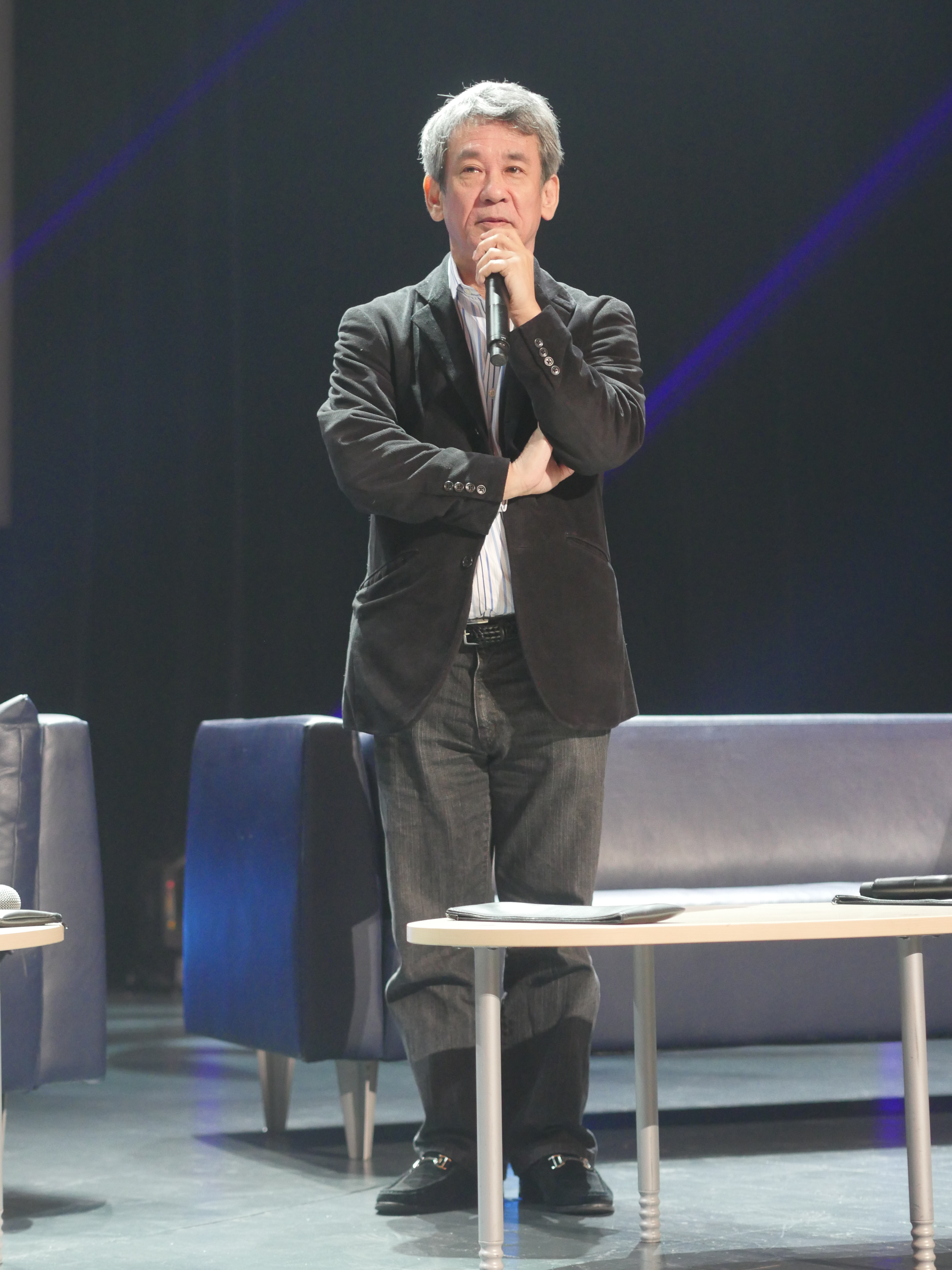
Shinji Hashimoto (shown in 2015) returned to produce Kingdom Hearts II, which he also helped promote at trade shows and marketing events.

As a joint project, Square Enix and Disney had different roles during development; the former oversaw the creative design and production, whereas the latter had approval over which content was included. Producer Shinji Hashimoto noted that they had earned Disney's trust, which allowed the team to put more into the sequel. While the Square Enix team was familiar with Disney's preferences when designing the game, Disney did veto a few elements. Square Enix's Product Development Division 1 handled development, with most of the first game's original staff returning. However, the Square Enix team worked with a different group of Disney employees than the first game. Tetsuya Nomura had plans for a sequel when working on the first Kingdom Hearts and returned as director. Nomura split his time over two years between directing Kingdom Hearts II and the animated film Final Fantasy VII: Advent Children.

=== Creative design ===
Planning for Kingdom Hearts II began around the completion of Kingdom Hearts Final Mix, but specific details were undecided until July 2003. Before development could begin, the team requested to showcase Mickey Mouse more, which required Disney's approval. Based on feedback from the first game, Nomura wanted a larger role for the character. The director planned the sequel to take place a year after the first Kingdom Hearts; however, he did not originally intend to provide players with an explanation of the events in that gap. During initial talks with Disney, the breadth of Nomura's ideas for a sequel also led to the conception of Kingdom Hearts: Chain of Memories. Developed for the Game Boy Advance, it bridges the stories of the first game and Kingdom Hearts II. Because Kingdom Hearts II was originally designed without Chain of Memories in mind, the team crafted the overall story so that the Game Boy Advance game was a supplement rather than a requirement for players.

The team aimed to provide a balanced story that would appeal to all audiences; the game has mystery and playful elements that can engage older and younger demographics, respectively. Scenario writer Kazushige Nojima considered reworking the previous games' established elements into something new the challenging part of writing the sequel's story. Similar to the previous game, Nomura provided Nojima plot points in order to write the scenario. He allowed Nojima creative freedom outside those points. When writing the story, Nojima integrated themes of light and dark, the heart, and the friendship between Sora and Riku into the scenario. As a guide, the team kept a list of the unresolved issues established in the first game. The script includes around 8,000 lines of dialogue. When writing dialogue, Nojima spoke the lines aloud and discarded anything he felt was too difficult to vocalize. Additionally, he minimized wordplay in the script to ensure localization outside Japan went smoothly.

Masaru Oka, the planning director for events, implemented a two-part scenario design for the worlds. In the first game, there was little to do in each world after defeating the boss. For the sequel, Oka wanted to provide players a second full scenario after the worlds' first boss was defeated. Nomura noted that despite having numerous "strictly defined" Disney worlds and characters, they combined in the game well because the individual properties had already integrated their own realistic and fantastical elements. In designing the Kingdom Hearts II universe, the team wanted to bring back previous worlds and introduce new ones. To accomplish this, they rebuilt the game's engine without reusing data from the first game. Encountering technical limitations when developing the first game prompted the team to build the engine from scratch. They also recreated assets and textures. The new game engine allowed the team to expand the returning worlds; for example, the Olympus Coliseum and Halloween Town worlds feature new areas from their respective source materials.

The developers reworked previous worlds for the sequel. Nomura selected Twilight Town as the game's starting world as an reference to Chain of Memories' ending, which focused on a midpoint between light and dark. The team designed Twilight Town's story and activities to provide fans and new players with equal footing. They also added several minigames to make it more engaging. The developers altered Hollow Bastion as an effect of the first game's events: the castle is being repaired and the surrounding waters were drained to reveal a town. They also chose it to replace Traverse Town as the game's hub world. The team decided to incorporate musical elements into Kingdom Hearts II—something they had conceived during the first game's development—and believed Atlantica was a good fit. Nomura noted that the The Little Mermaid's songs are recognizable even to those unfamiliar with the film. Committing wholeheartedly to the concept, they infused musical gameplay into the world's entire scenario.

New worlds were selected for a variety of reasons. When visiting with Disney staff to localize the first Kingdom Hearts, Nomura saw material for Tron 2.0, which inspired him to include the Space Paranoids world. He believed the retro aesthetic would be interesting and refreshing. Nomura considered Beast an important character in the first game and wanted him in the sequel. He added Beast's Castle from Beauty and the Beast to facilitate his return. The Pride Lands world was intended for the first game but was omitted due to technical limitations of the game's engine. Nomura considered the inclusion of The Nightmare Before Christmas in the first game as an unexpected world and wanted a bigger surprise in the sequel for fans. While contemplating this, Pirates of the Caribbean: The Curse of the Black Pearl released and Nomura pitched it to his team, who were enthusiastic. Despite the source material being live-action, he likened mixing it with the Kingdom Hearts aesthetics to Who Framed Roger Rabbit. Additionally, he believed the development team could successfully create the Pirates of the Caribbean's visuals because most of the staff had previously worked on the Final Fantasy series, including Final Fantasy X, which feature character models that are more humanlike than Kingdom Hearts.

=== Gameplay design ===
The Gummi Ship segments were redesigned for Kingdom Hearts II.

The development team aimed to retain the original's concepts but update the system of the game to provide a better player experience. Many gameplay aspects were reworked for the sequel. Some changes were made due to player feedback while others were meant to be included in previous games but were omitted due to time or technological constraints. The camera system and Gummi Ship portions were reworked based on negative feedback to the first game. The camera controls were switched from the DualShock controller's shoulder buttons to the right analog stick in order to make them more user friendly. Despite receiving a negative reception, Nomura retained the Gummi Ship because he liked the concept. He assigned a small team to focus on reworking it for the sequel. Nomura wanted the segments to invoke feelings of being on a Disney amusement park ride.

In keeping with the ethos of updating the game systems, Nomura wanted to the retain the basis of the battle system while providing the player a wider range of strategies. This included changes to the game's magic and summons. Summon characters were altered to function more like a member of Sora's party. The combat system was completely redone and did not use animations or data from the first game. Because Sora had matured, the developers wanted his fighting style to reflect that. Kentaro Yasui, one of the main programmers, recalled the challenges of managing numerous changes near the end of Kingdom Hearts' development. For the sequel, he created a development tool to facilitate agile changes to character actions. Yuichi Kanemori, the game's battle director, drew inspiration from fighting games when crafting the combat. He believed that players feel exhilaration when executing fighting maneuvers.

More maneuvers were added that give players more choices in battle. Nomura was unable to include the Drive forms in the original game and implemented them in Kingdom Hearts II. The Brave and Wisdom forms were designed early in the process. The team experimented with several ideas for the Master and Final forms because they initially struggled to conceive a good mix of swordplay with magic. To facilitate further strategy during combat, the team added interactive objects throughout the game worlds. Kanemori believed the Reaction Command and combo attacks with party members would provide the original's system a "new look and feel". He made the Reaction Command actions contextual to avoid embedding it within the command menu; he felt too many commands in the menu would make accessing the options too complex. During development, Yasui's design tool allowed Kanemori to quickly create new characters actions and adjust the related programming variables to fine tune the actions.

Kingdom Hearts II introduced Nobodies as a new enemy type. The team designed them to look and behave differently from Heartless enemies: Heartless have rounded shapes and feature a variety of colors, whereas Nobodies' shapes have sharp lines and achromatic colors. Additionally, the developers experimented with how the models' skeleton moved in order to have Nobodies maneuver differently.

=== Audio ===
==== Music ====
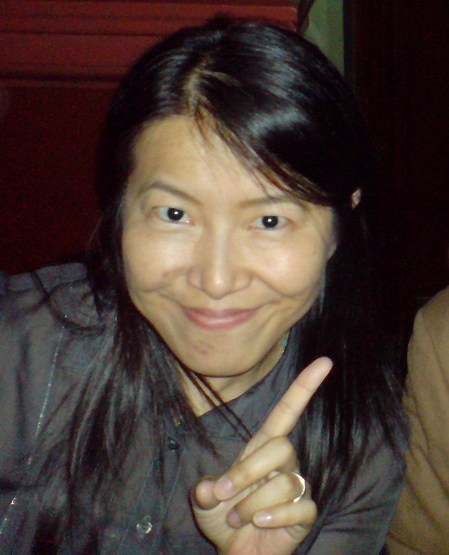
Yoko Shimomura (shown in 2007)

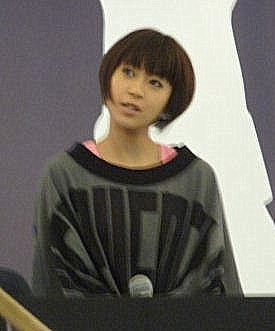
Hikaru Utada (shown in 2009)

Yoko Shimomura and Hikaru Utada returned to produce music for the sequel.

Like the first game, Kingdom Hearts II features music by Yoko Shimomura and Hikaru Utada. Shimomura built upon the foundation of the first game, which she felt was an easier creative process; she considered blending Disney elements with the darker nature of the original Kingdom Hearts more difficult. The musical-style songs feature Japanese and English lyrics depending on the game's region, something Shimomura felt completely changed the scenes' atmosphere. Nojima wrote the lyrics to the musical songs in the Atlantica world; he watched The Little Mermaid as research. Since he wrote the lyrics before hearing the music, he told Shimomura to change the lyrics as needed. Several songs from the previous games reappear; for example, "Twilight Town", which Shimomura originally composed for Chain of Memories, is featured. The original soundtrack for Kingdom Hearts II was composed by Shimomura and released on January 25, 2006. The opening orchestration and ending credits theme were arranged and orchestrated by Kaoru Wada and performed by the Tokyo Philharmonic Orchestra.

The main vocal theme for the Japanese release is "Passion", written and performed by Utada. An English version titled "Sanctuary" was used in Western releases. Utada began working on "Passion" in 2003, and while creating it, the developers approached them about singing the theme song for Kingdom Hearts II. Nomura wanted Utada to return in part because he was aware that fans associated them with the franchise. Compared to the previous theme, he provided Utada more detailed story notes with an emphasis on Sora and Riku's reunion. The developers also provided sketches and video of the ending segment the song would play. Having worked on the previous game, Utada could more easily visualize how the song connected to the scene and aimed to match the impact of "Hikari". After Utada completed the song, the developers adjusted the final movie to ensure the content synchronized with the music. Utada's involvement was announced on July 29, 2005. Prior to the announcement, Nomura declined to comment on whether Utada would return for the sequel. The CD single for "Passion" was released on December 14, 2005, and "Sanctuary" was first previewed on MTV's official website in early 2006.

==== Voice cast ====
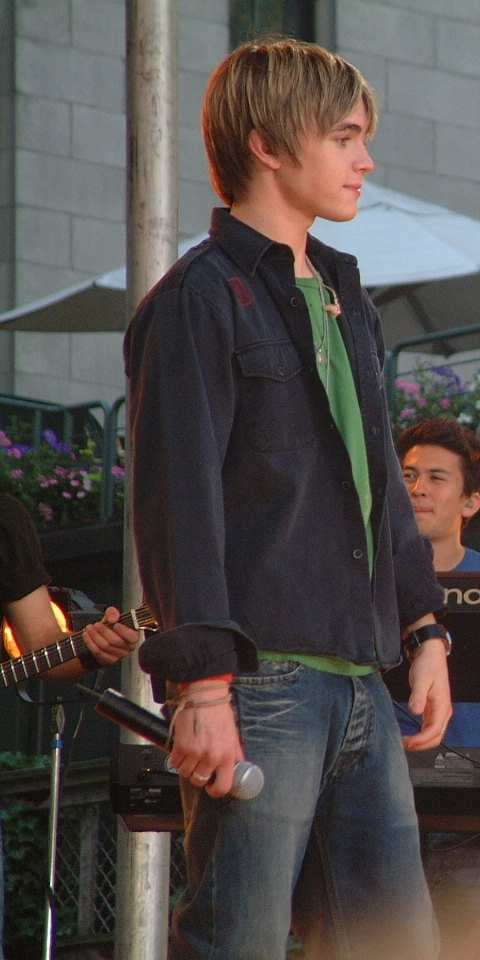
Jesse McCartney (shown in 2005)

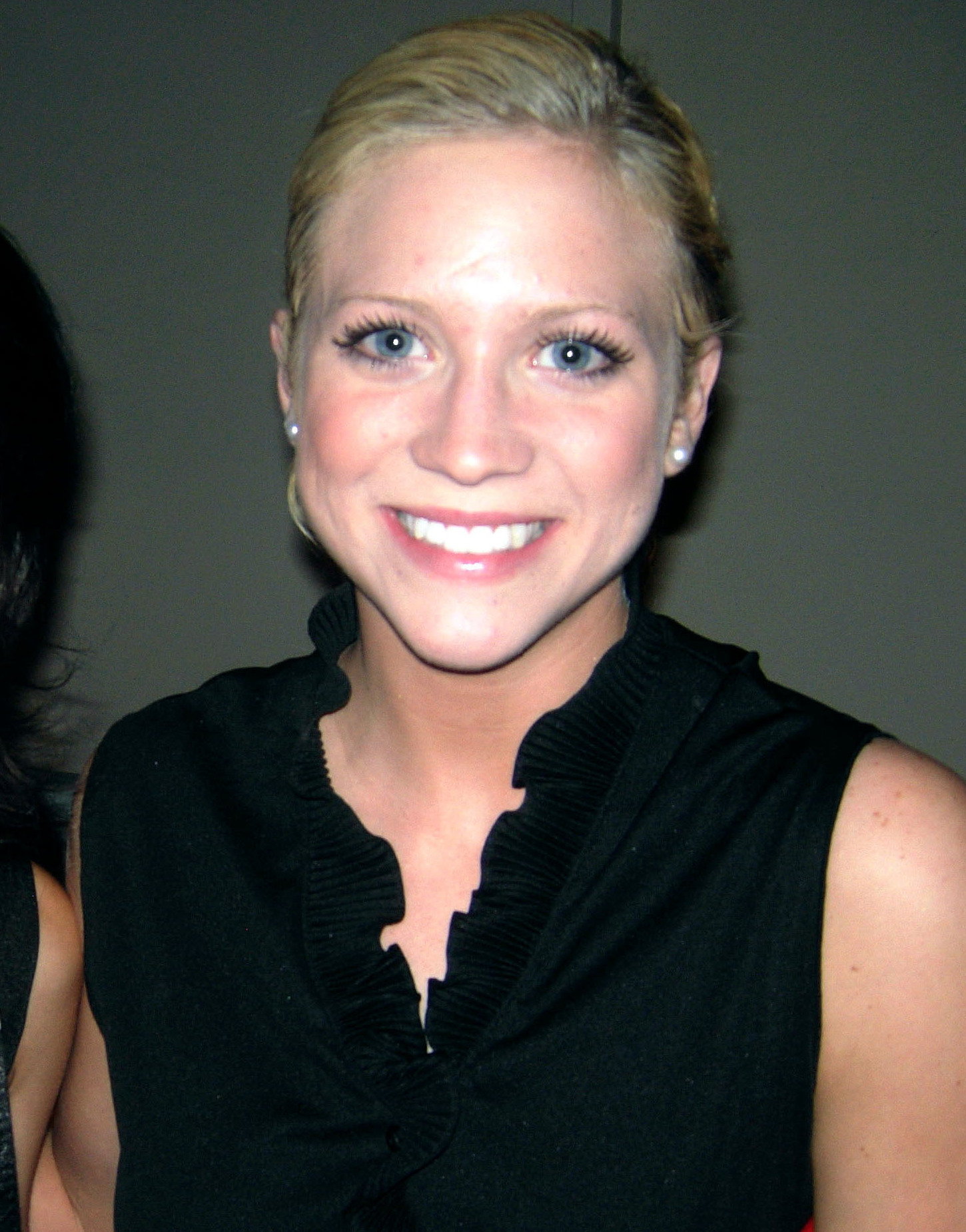
Brittany Snow (shown in 2007)

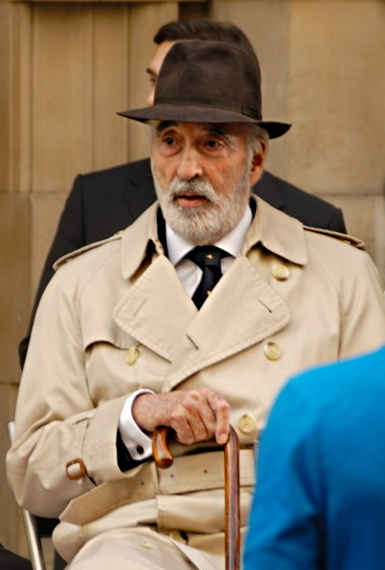
Christopher Lee (shown in 2007)

Several performers joined production to voice original characters that were either new or had not yet been voiced in the series. The English voice cast included Jess McCartney as Roxas, Brittany Snow as Naminé, and Christopher Lee as Diz.

Disney oversaw the voice casting, and Square Enix had final approval to determine whether the casting fit the role, with a focus on non-Disney characters. Kingdom Hearts II features well-known voice actors for both the Japanese and English versions. Many of the original voice actors from the first Kingdom Hearts reprised their roles; Miyu Irino and Haley Joel Osment as Sora, Mamoru Miyano and David Gallagher as Riku, and Risa Uchida and Hayden Panettiere as Kairi. Voice actors new to series include Koki Uchiyama and Jesse McCartney as Roxas, Iku Nakahara and Brittany Snow as Naminé, and Genzō Wakayama and Christopher Lee as DiZ. Osment recalled that the producers provided the voice actors a flow chart of the plot in order to help them understand the story's complexity.

Irino, Miyano, and Uchida learned of Kingdom Hearts II during the winter of 2004 while recording commercials for Chain of Memories. The three recorded most of their Kingdom Hearts II dialogue separately, with only a few scenes done together. They all did their original Kingdom Hearts roles early in their careers and felt more seasoned for the sequel. Their voices had matured since they voiced the first game, which led Irino and Uchida to replicate their voices from that time—both were in junior high at that point—because the sequel takes place only a year after the original. However, the production staff instructed Irino to use his normal voice in order to portray the character as stronger rather than younger. While Irino still aimed to keep Sora innocent and optimistic, the character required more complex emotions compared to the first game. Similarly, Uchida aimed to convey more strength since Kairi took a more active role this time. Conversely, Miyano leaned into his deeper voice more to match an adult Riku. However, the production staff had him tone it down since the character had aged only a year. The English voice cast also noted differences from the original game. Panettiere felt the sequel had evolved from the first. A difficult scene for her required Panettiere to record it multiple times in order to convey the right emotion. Gallagher considered Riku a darker character, which he aimed to portray well.

Many actors reprised their Disney roles for Kingdom Hearts II, including Ming-Na Wen as Mulan, James Woods as Hades, Bruce Boxleitner as Tron, Chris Sarandon as Jack Skellington, Angela Lansbury as Mrs. Potts, Kenneth Mars as King Triton, and Zach Braff as Chicken Little. Some characters were given new voice actors in the English version; Ansem, Aerith Gainsborough, Squall Leonhart, Sephiroth, and Hercules are voiced by Richard Epcar, Mena Suvari, Doug Erholtz, George Newbern, and Tate Donovan, respectively. Newcomer Tifa Lockhart was voiced by Rachael Leigh Cook. Several Final Fantasy characters were voiced by new actors, which Square Enix attributed to actor scheduling conflicts.

Actors who reprised their Disney film role for Kingdom Hearts II
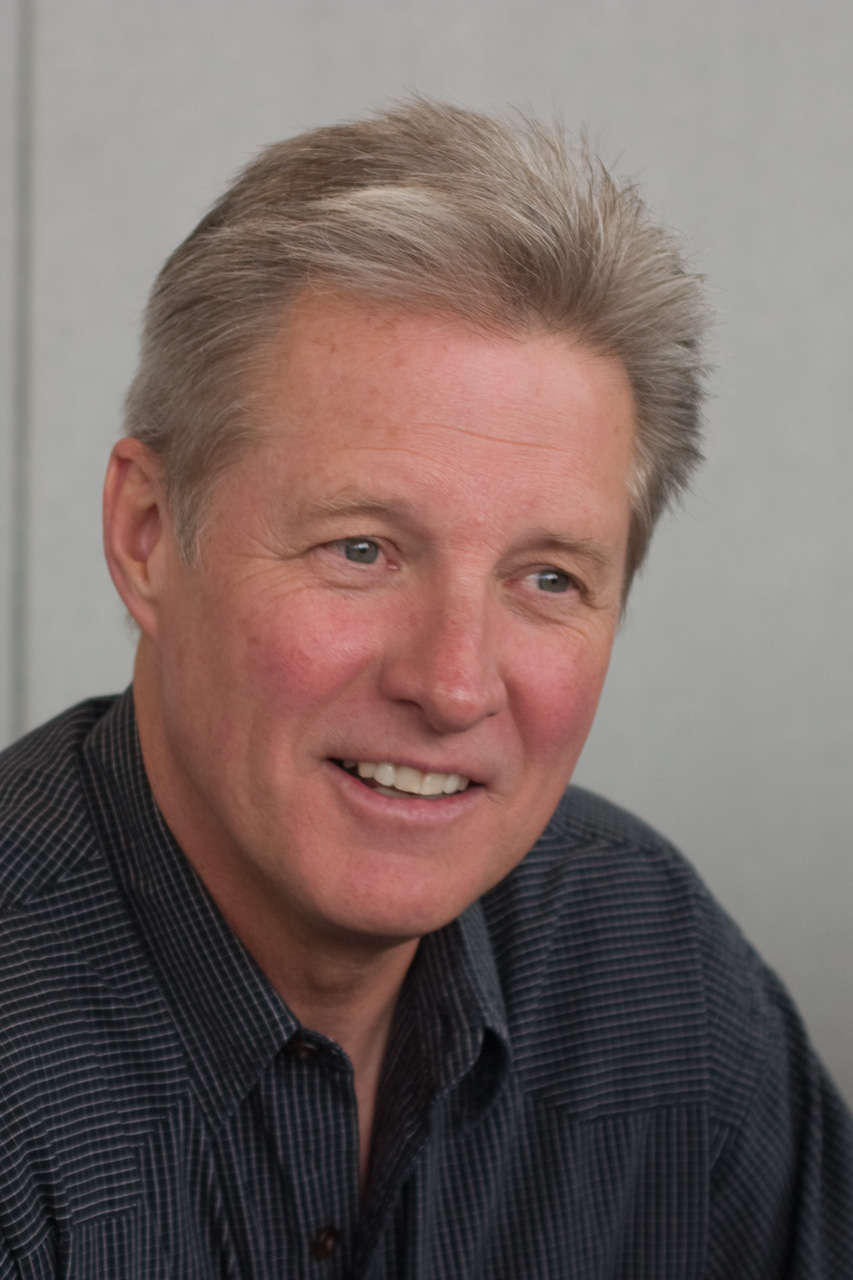
Bruce Boxleitner (shown in 2008)

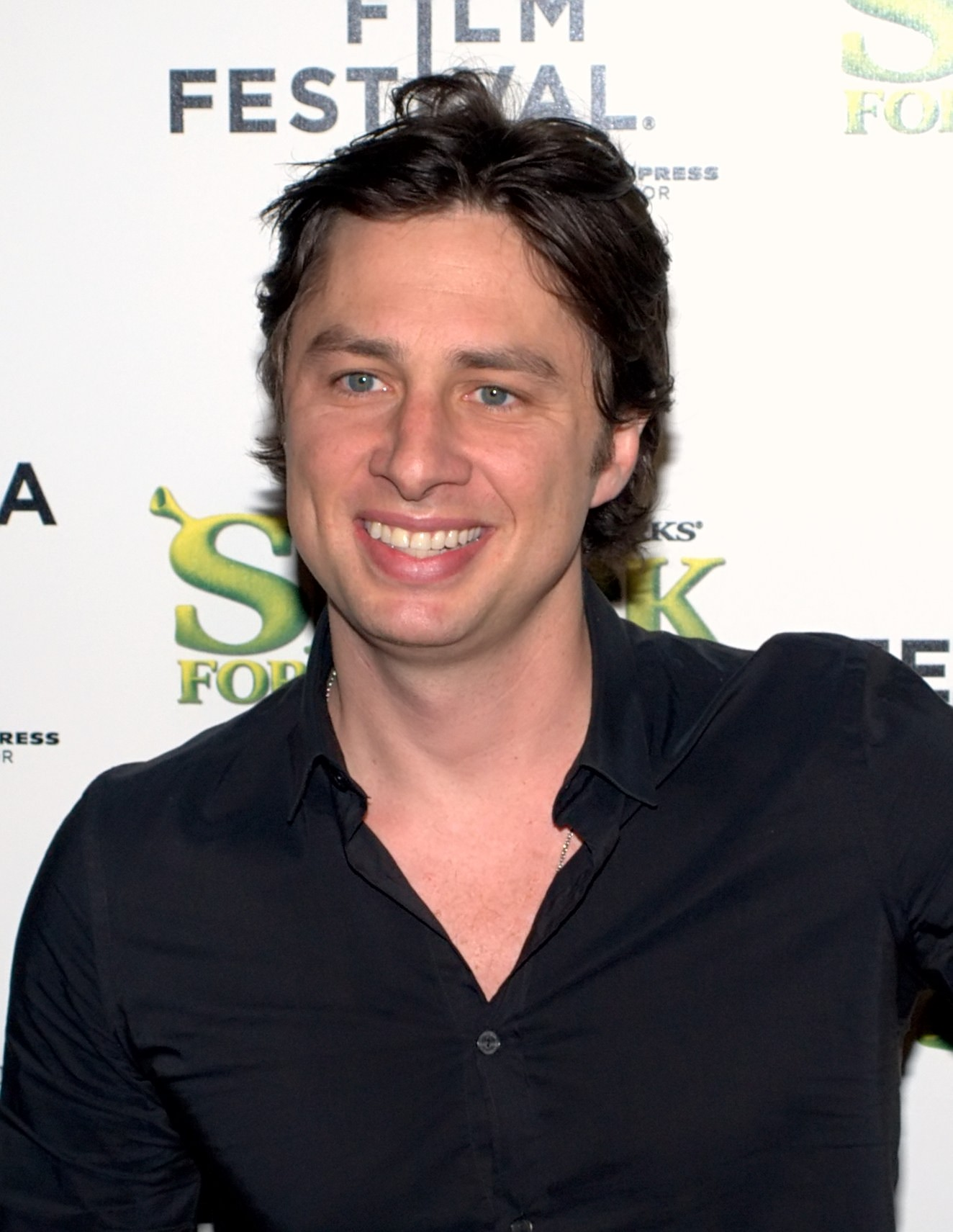
Zach Braff (shown in 2010)

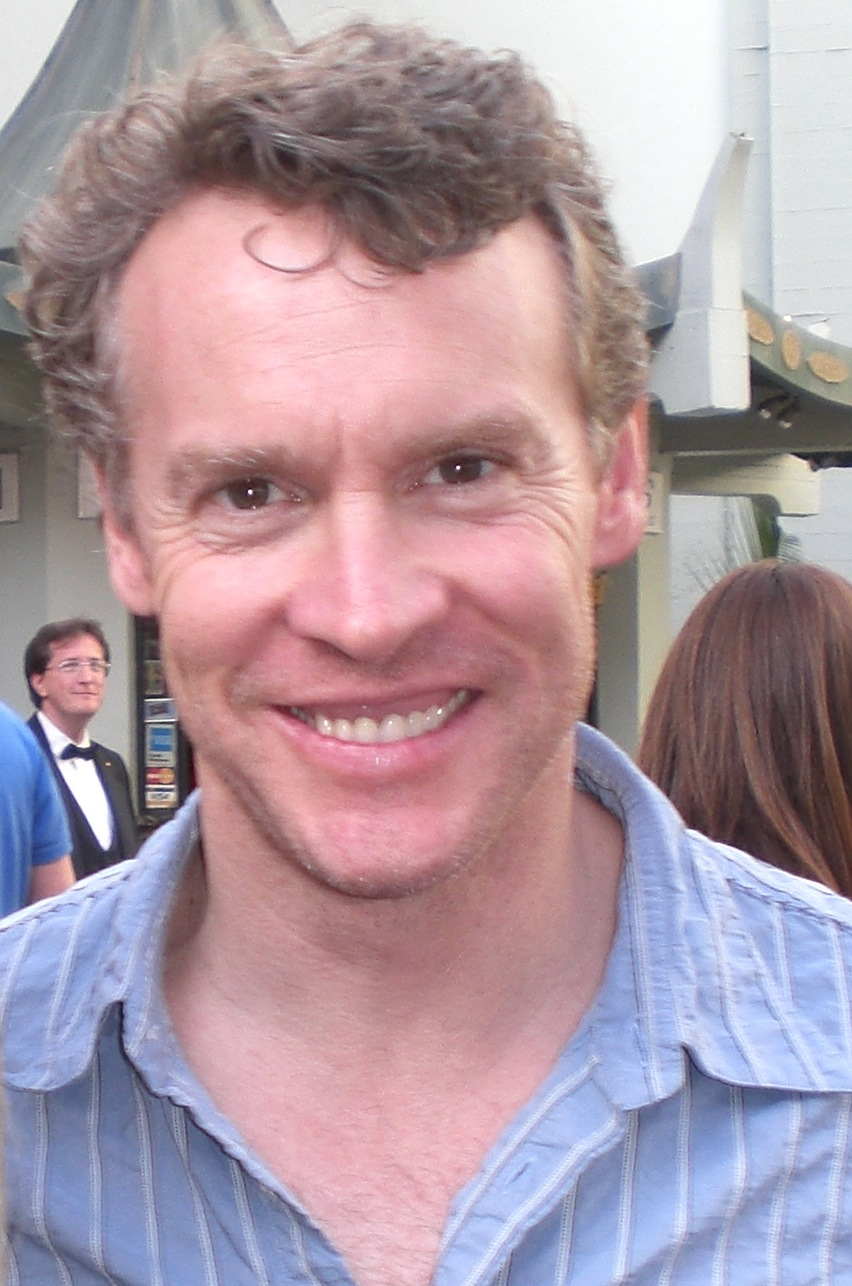
Tate Donovan (shown in 2007)

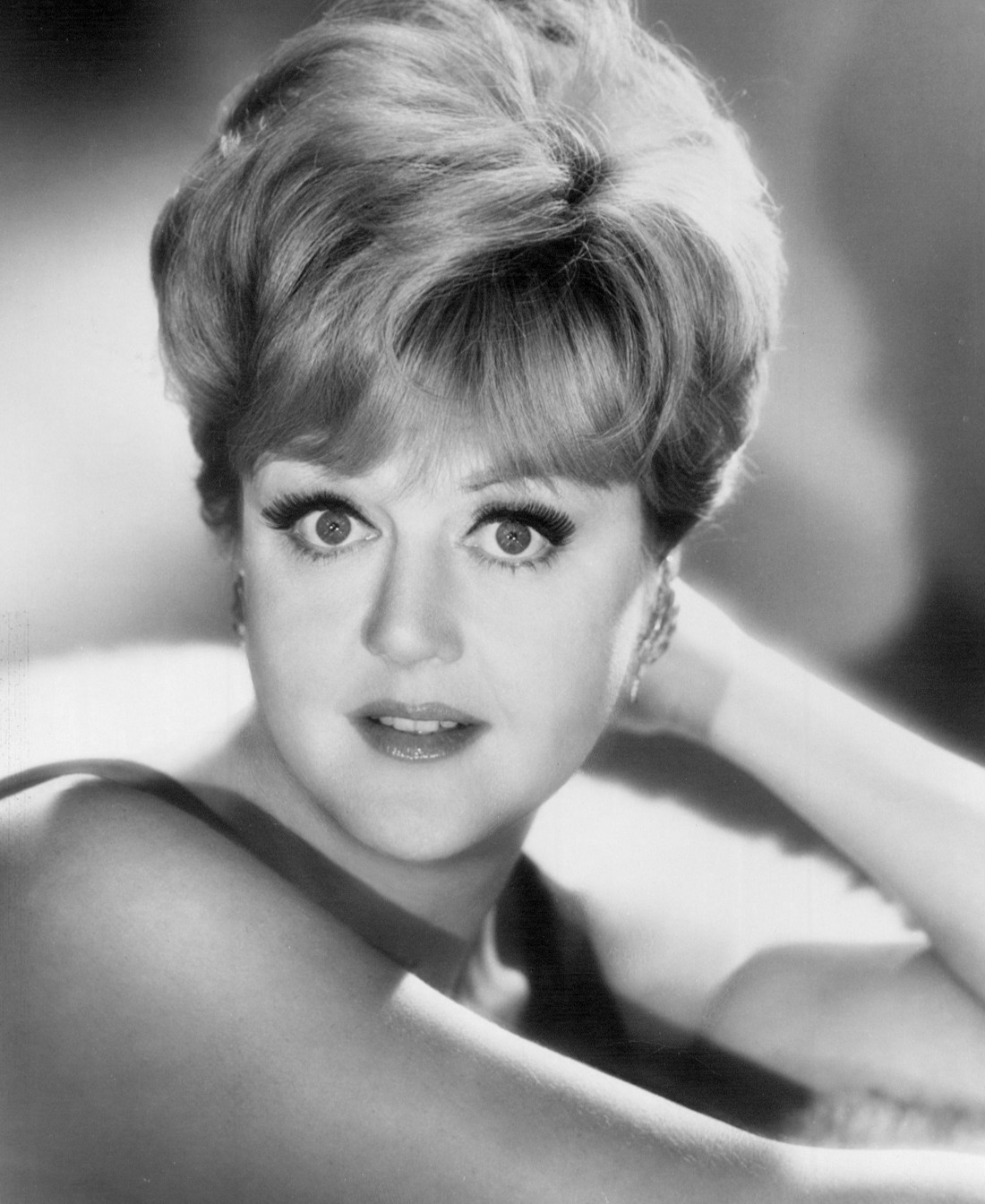
Angela Lansbury (shown in 1966)

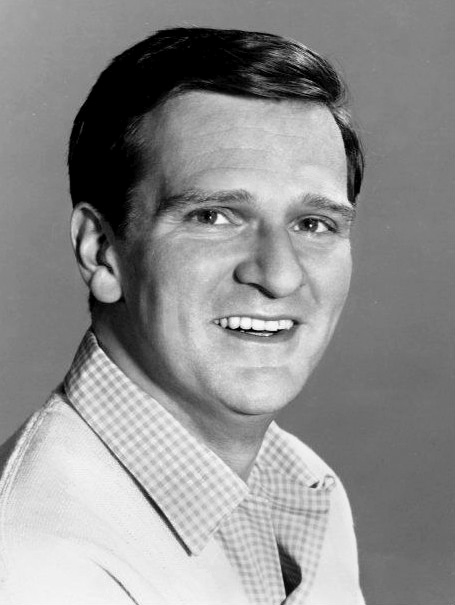
Kenneth Mars (shown in 1967)

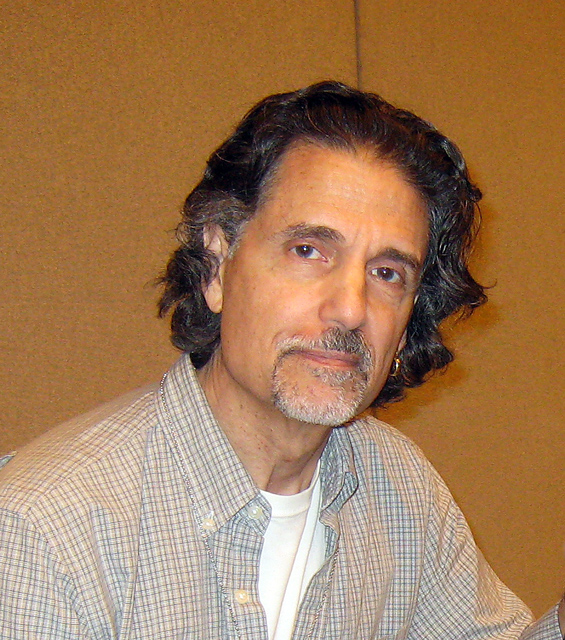
Chris Sarandon (shown in 2009)

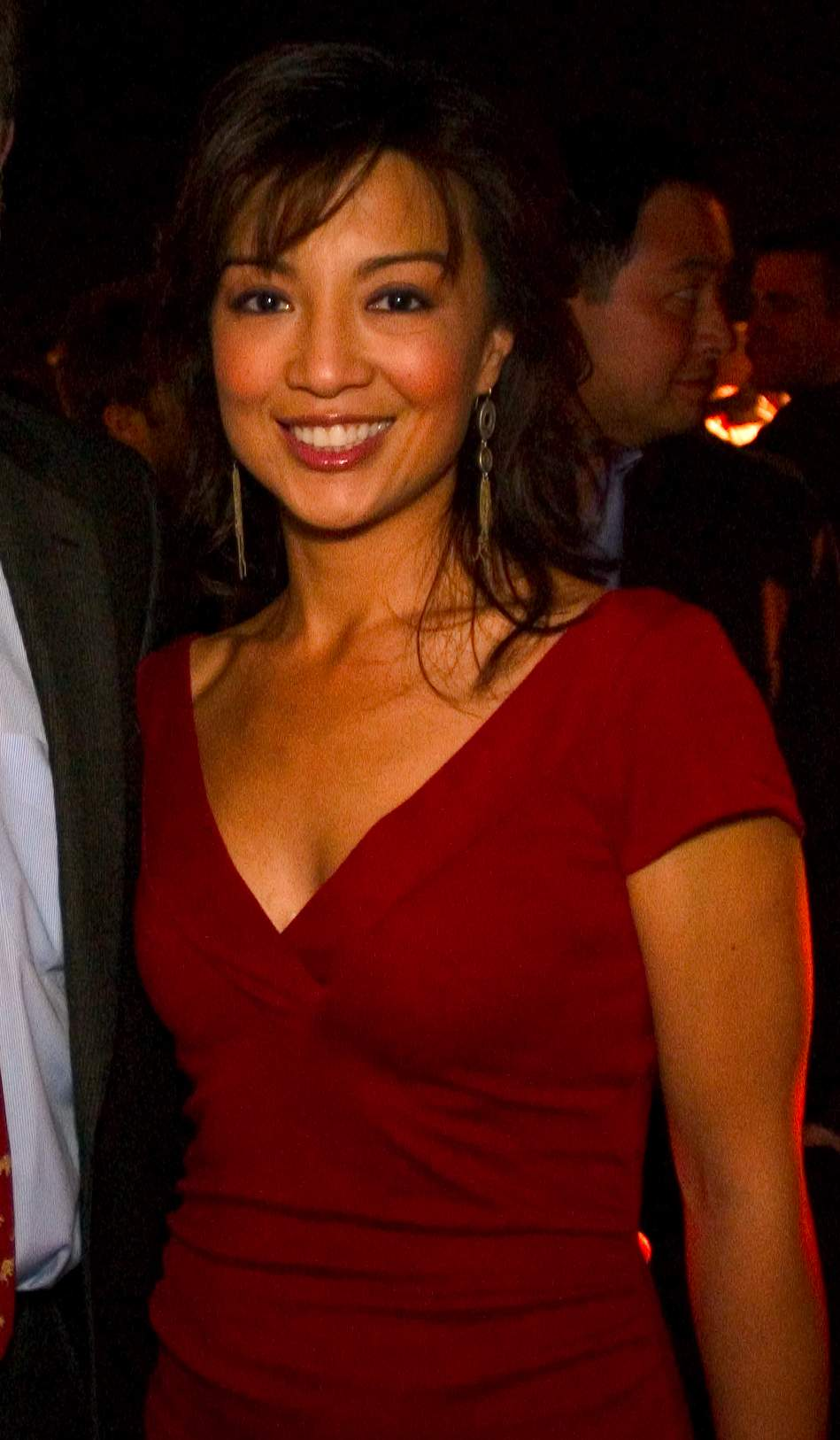
Ming-Na Wen (shown in 2006)

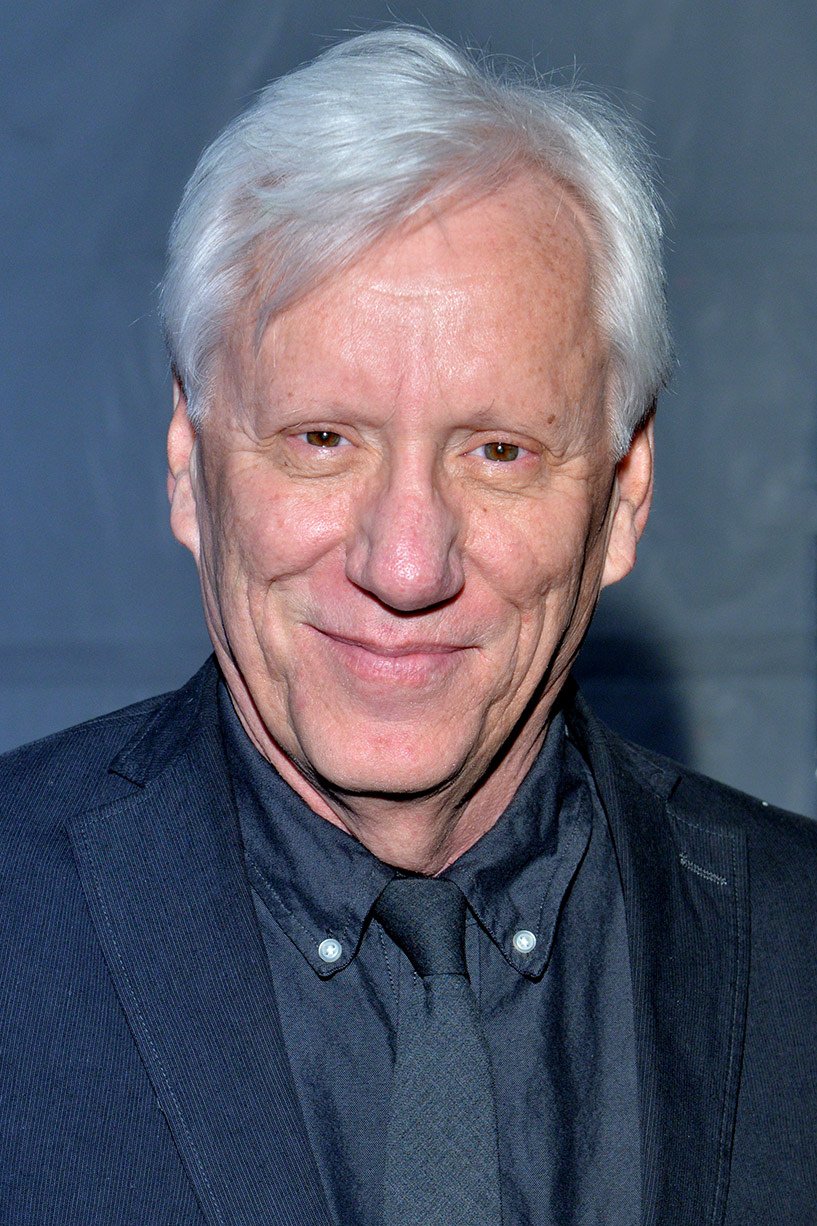
James Woods (shown in 2015)

== Promotion and marketing ==
An unlockable trailer in Kingdom Hearts and Kingdom Hearts Final Mix hinted at the possibility of a sequel. Rumors were spurred in Japan in March 2003 when video game website Quiter reported that an anonymous internal source at Square (Note: Square, who developed the first Kingdom Hearts game, merged with Enix in April 2003 to form Square Enix.) confirmed that development of Kingdom Hearts II had begun. Later in September 2003, Buena Vista Games and Square Enix jointly announced at the Tokyo Game Show that Kingdom Hearts II, along with Chain of Memories, were in production. Initial plot details placed Kingdom Hearts II after Chain of Memories, which takes place directly after the first game, and included the return of Sora, Donald, and Goofy, as well as new costumes. Information about Mickey Mouse's involvement was kept to a minimum. Square Enix aimed to co-publish the game with Buena Vista Games for the PlayStation 2 in 2004 or later.

Although the game was announced in September 2003, Square Enix provided few updates until the game was closer to completion. A fall 2005 release window was not announced until the end of 2004; the December date for the Japanese release was later publicized in September 2005. Regarding the period of silence, Nomura admitted that the game was announced too early and information was not publicized until a debut period was in sight. Andrew Vestal of Official U.S. PlayStation Magazine attributed the yearlong delay to development falling behind due to organizational struggles within Square Enix following Square and Enix's 2003 merger.

As the release date approached, Square Enix incrementally revealed a few new characters and worlds via trailers and demonstrations at trade presentations. The developers highlighted the game at its 2004 E3 press conference. Hashimoto and Nomura unveiled a short trailer to the video game press behind closed doors. The trailer featured new unknown characters as well as returning ones. While at the event, the developers said that many mysteries of the first game would be answered. Square Enix continued to promote Kingdom Hearts II at the 2004 Tokyo Game Show. Nomura answered press questions, and a playable demonstration was available for attendees. The following year, the company showcased the game at E3 in May and the Tokyo Game Show in September.

Square Enix launched the official Japanese website in May 2005. It featured information regarding characters and worlds. Following the website launch, Kingdom Hearts II began receiving coverage in Japan's prominent video game publications. Commercials aired in Japan that highlighted the numerous Disney characters. In July 2005, the company promoted the game, among several others, at its annual Square Enix Party at the Makuhari Messe center in Chiba, Japan. Attendees could play a demo version of Kingdom Hearts II.

While Square Enix aimed for a winter holiday release date in North America, the window was pushed back a few months. The company dedicated US$3 million to Kingdom Hearts II's North American launch campaign, which included print and TV advertisements that focused on the variety of characters and worlds. Disney reviewed the campaign details to ensure it was not advertised in venues and on networks associated with sexual overtones or violence. An English language version website for the game went live in December 2005, featuring similar content as its Japanese counterpart. Square Enix and Buena Vista Games jointly announced the English voice cast in February 2006. The week before the North American release, Square Enix held a launch party at the Pacific Design Center in West Hollywood, California. To promote the game, the English voice cast in attendance gave media interviews, demo stations were available to play, and game footage was screened.

=== Merchandise and printed adaptations ===
Prior to the game's release, Square Enix published an Ultimania book, titled Kingdom Hearts Series Ultimania α ~Introduction of Kingdom Hearts II~, that provides extended information on the first two Kingdom Hearts games and previewed Kingdom Hearts II. After the game's release, the company published Kingdom Hearts II Ultimania, which focuses solely on the game. Another Ultimania book, titled Kingdom Hearts II Final Mix+ Ultimania, was published following Final Mix's release. Released along with Final Mix, Kingdom Hearts -Another Report- was a hardback book which includes game information, visuals by Shiro Amano, and a director interview. In North America, BradyGames published two strategy guides: a standard guide and a limited-edition version. The latter was available in four different covers and included a copy of Jiminy's Journal along with 400 stickers.

Square Enix released a limited run of Play Arts action figures based on Kingdom Hearts II characters—Sora, Kairi, Roxas, and Axel—in 2006. The company released various other Kingdom Hearts II figures afterward, such as a King Mickey Bright Arts figure and a Sora SH Figuarts figure. Almost twenty years after the game's release, Square Enix released a Form-ism figure of Sora as depicted in Kingdom Hearts II. While Square Enix produced a range of Kingdom Hearts toys in Japan, the company did not export them due to licensing restrictions on Disney properties.

Similar to the previous two games, Square Enix published a manga adaptation in its Monthly Shōnen Gangan magazine with Shiro Amano returning to draw the series. Serialization began in 2006 but went on hiatus while Amano shifted focus to the Kingdom Hearts 358/2 Days manga. The Kingdom Hearts II manga resumed in October 2012 and continued until May 2015. During the adaptation's run in Monthly Shōnen Gangan, Square Enix released the manga as ten standalone volumes in Japan. The first was published in December 2006. Tokyopop published the first two volumes in North America; the first in July 2007 and the second the following year in May. Spanish language versions were published by Planeta DeAgostini. After the original serialization resumed in 2012, Yen Press obtained the North American publishing rights in 2013 as Tokyopop had shutdown its operations in that region in 2011. Yen Press published the fourth volume in May 2017.

Square Enix also published light novel adaptations of Kingdom Hearts II in Japan from 2006–2007. Written by Tomoco Kanemaki and illustrated by Shiro Amano, Nojima supervised the four-volume project. Yen Press localized the volumes into two English omnibus volumes in 2017. It later combined them into a single omnibus for a Western release—Kingdom Hearts II: The Novel. In 2021, the publisher included it in a compilation of all the series' localized light novels titled Kingdom Hearts: The Complete Novel.

== Release ==
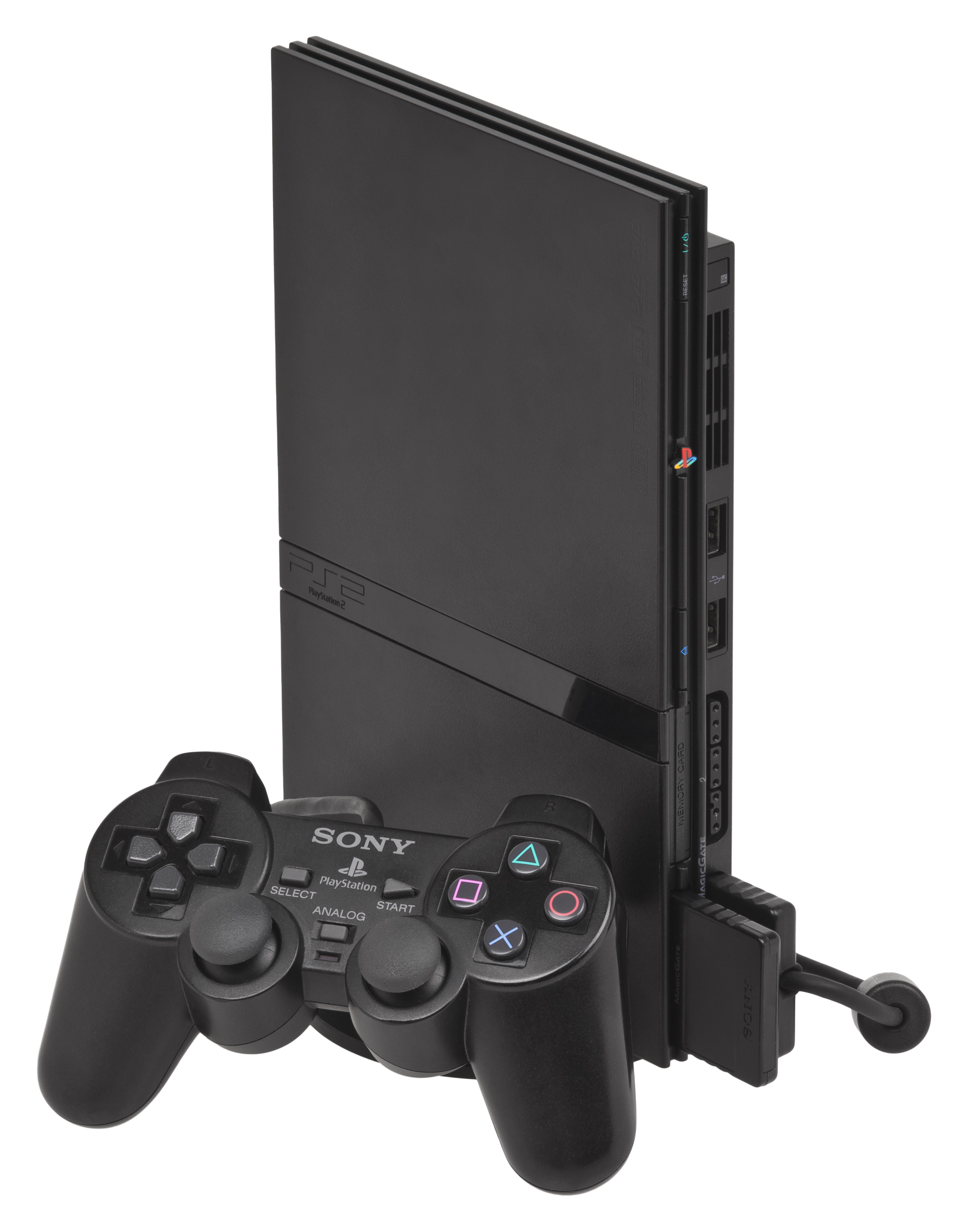
Kingdom Hearts II and its enhanced version, Final Mix, were originally released exclusively for the PlayStation 2 (slim model shown).

Square Enix published Kingdom Hearts II in three regions (Japan, North America, and PAL regions), which differ nominally in content editing and localization. The game released first in Japan in December 2005. In addition to a standard release, Square Enix published a commemorative box set, titled Kingdom Hearts Trinity Masterpiece, (Note: キングダム ハーツ トリニティ マスターピース, Kingudamu Hātsu Toriniti Masutāpīsu) exclusively in Japan. The set contains the first two games as well as Kingdom Hearts II. The publisher also prepared a postcard calendar set as a preorder bonus for the standard edition.

The North American version released a few months later in March 2006. In this version, enemy weapons that resembled guns were altered due to concerns of content ratings. The European and Australian PAL version, which released in September 2006, is reformatted to run at 50 Hz in order to fit the screen resolution size of PAL encoding systems. As part of the localization process, the developers provided Square Enix's localization team with a preliminary build of the Japanese version. The team familiarized itself with the game's text, spoken dialogue, menus, and other materials before translating. The translators prioritized the game's glossaries as well as the spoken dialogue in order to provide sufficient lead time for finding voice talent and recording the English lines. After localization, Square Enix released enhanced versions with additional content.

The company anticipated total worldwide sales to reach 10 million units. Within a week of releasing in Japan, Square Enix shipped one million copies of Kingdom Hearts II. By the end 2006, it had shipped over 3.5 million units worldwide: 1.1 million in Japan, 1.7 million in North America, and 0.7 million in PAL regions. The total number of units shipped worldwide exceeded 4 million by the end of March 2007.

=== Final Mix ===
Similar to the first game, Kingdom Hearts II received an enhanced version with additional content titled Kingdom Hearts II Final Mix. Final Mix was first released exclusively in Japan on March 29, 2007, as a two-disc set: Kingdom Hearts II Final Mix+. The first disc contains Kingdom Hearts II Final Mix while the second contains Kingdom Hearts Re:Chain of Memories, a full 3D remake of Chain of Memories for the PlayStation 2. Re:Chain of Memories retains the card-based combat system from the Game Boy Advance version and incorporates Reaction Commands from Kingdom Hearts II. Like Kingdom Hearts Final Mix, the two games serve as a canonical update to the series. The book Kingdom Hearts -Another Report- was included with the game for those who reserved a copy.

Production of Kingdom Hearts II Final Mix began after the original North American and European versions were localized. When Kingdom Hearts II released in North America, both Nomura and Hashimoto publicly commented that the company had no intention of creating a Final Mix version; Hashimoto indicated that they were instead focused on localizing it for Europe. Despite Kingdom Hearts Final Mix's success, Nomura did not plan to produce a Final Mix version of the sequel; he wanted its initial release to be a complete version that included the English voice tracks. However, Nomura had to omit content due to delays with the English voice recording and the game file's size approaching the disc's storage capacity. When localizing Kingdom Hearts II, the programmers cleaned up the data, which reduced the total file size enough to add in the English tracks and restore removed content. Square Enix promoted the game at the 2006 Tokyo Game Show, the 2007 World Hobby Fair, and its 2007 Square Enix Party. The company later re-released Final Mix+ in June 2008 as part of its "Ultimate Hits" budget line of best sellers.

=== HD 2.5 Remix ===
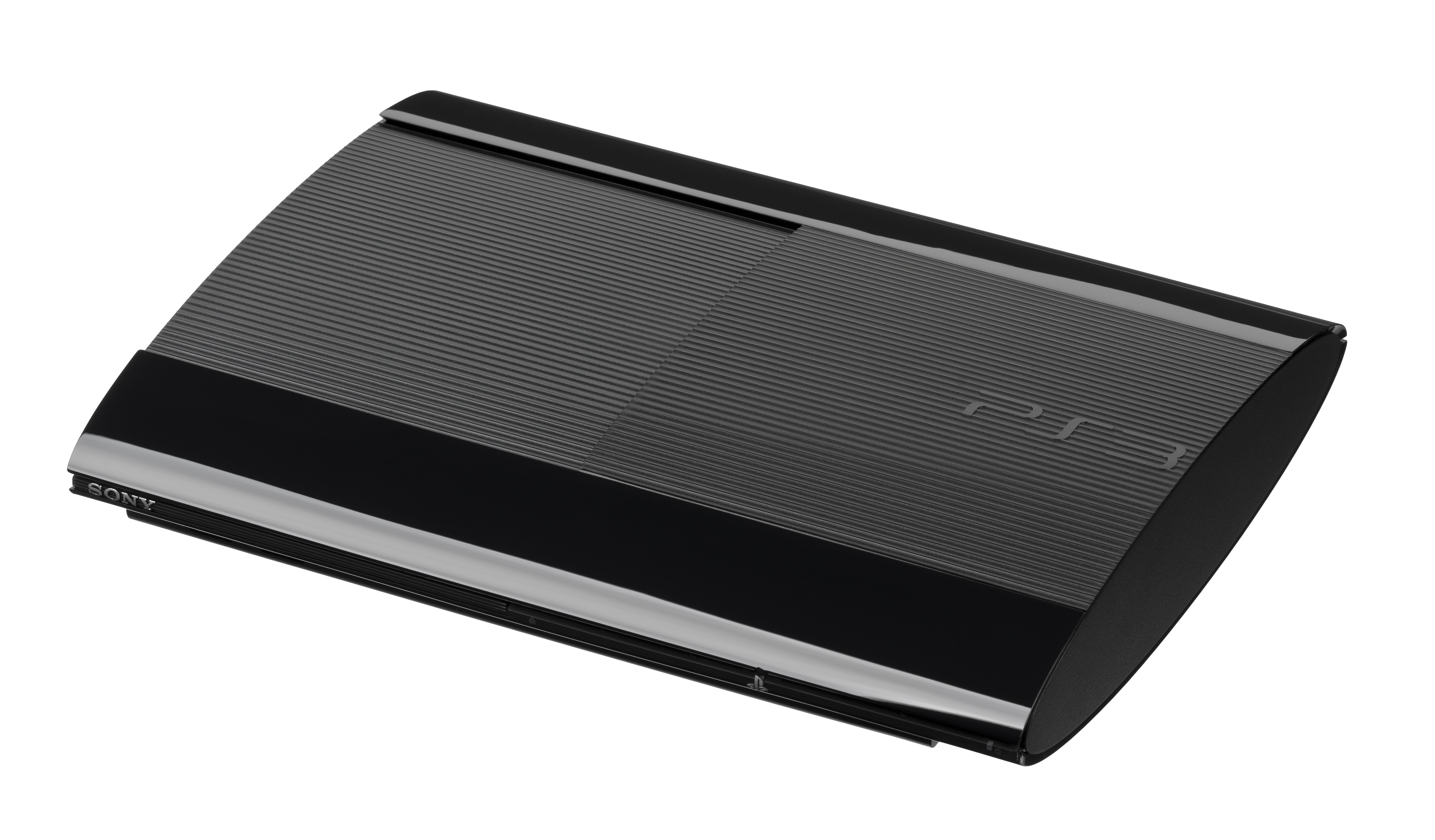
Kingdom Hearts HD 2.5 Remix released exclusively on the PlayStation 3 (Super Slim model shown) before being published on multiple consoles years later.

Kingdom Hearts II Final Mix was released outside Japan for the first time as part of the Kingdom Hearts HD 2.5 Remix collection. The development team reused assets from the Kingdom Hearts HD 1.5 Remix collection, which allowed them to focus on improving the quality of the second compilation. Changes included switching to a widescreen aspect ratio and remixing 80% of the audio. As the developers felt that Kingdom Hearts II was already well balanced, they decided against making major gameplay changes.

In the credits of 1.5 Remix, clips of Kingdom Hearts II Final Mix appeared, hinting at its inclusion in a future collection. On October 14, 2013, Square Enix announced the second compilation exclusively for the PlayStation 3. It includes both Kingdom Hearts II Final Mix and Kingdom Hearts Birth by Sleep Final Mix in high definition (HD) as well as HD cinematic scenes from Kingdom Hearts Re:coded and trophy support. Square Enix published the collection in Japan on October 2, 2014. Releases in other territories followed two months later: North America on December 2, 2014; Australia on December 4, 2014; and Europe on December 5, 2014. Square Enix later released HD 2.5 Remix on other platforms, including Xbox One, Nintendo Switch, and home computers.

== Reception ==
Anticipation was high for Kingdom Hearts II prior to release. Electronic Gaming Monthly (EGM) readers voted it the number eight and ten on the magazine's list of top ten most wanted games during the months of June 2004 and December 2004, respectively. Similarly, the readers of PlayStation Magazine voted it among the most wanted games throughout 2004. The title fluctuated between second and third place on the magazine's list from January–April before holding at number two into the summer. By September 2004 Kingdom Hearts II remained second. The editors of GMR magazine ranked it the eighth most anticipated game of 2005, noting that fans were eager for a follow-up to the original. Ahead of the North American release, Play magazine readers voted Kingdom Hearts II the third most wanted game.

=== Sales ===
The game sold almost 730,000 copies during the first week of its release in Japan. The NPD Group reported that the game was the second top selling PlayStation 2 title and the seventh overall in Japan in December 2005. The organization reported that Kingdom Hearts II was the highest-selling console game in North America during March 2006 with 614,000 copies. Within four weeks, sales exceeded one million copies in North America. Kingdom Hearts II remained the top seller in North America in April 2006. Additionally, the Greatest Hits re-release of the first Kingdom Hearts saw a resurgence, appearing at number 17 on the overall ranking and number 10 on the PlayStation 2 ranking. The following month, Kingdom Hearts II dipped to second on the top seller list. In June, it dropped to thirteenth overall and was the seventh best-selling PlayStation 2 game. GameStop report that the game was its best-selling title for the first quarter of 2006. Similarly, IGN's editors listed it as the second "top seller" in 2006. At the beginning of 2007, over 1.5 million copies had been sold. Based on Amazon.com figures, Final Mix+ was the best-selling PlayStation 2 game during the week of its release in Japan.

=== Critical response ===
Reception

Aggregate scores
| Aggregator | Score |
|---|---|
| GameRankings | 87.5% |
| Metacritic | 87/100 |

Review scores
| Publication | Score |
|---|---|
| 1Up.com | 9/10 |
| Electronic Gaming Monthly | 10/10, 9/10, 9.5/10 |
| Eurogamer | 8/10 |
| Famitsu | 10/10, 9/10, 10/10, 10/10 |
| Game Informer | 9/10 |
| GamePro | 4.5/5 |
| GameRevolution | B+ |
| GameSpot | 8.7/10 |
| GameSpy | 4.5/5 |
| GamesRadar+ | 4.5/5 |
| GameZone | 9.4/10 |
| IGN | 7.6/10 |
| PALGN | 8.5/10 |
| RPGFan | 93% |

Awards
| Publication | Award |
|---|---|
| Satellite Award | Outstanding Game Based on Existing Medium (2006) |
| Famitsu | Game of the Year (2005) |
| Electronic Gaming Monthly | Game of the Month (May 2006); Best Sequel (2006) |
| G4 | Best Voice Over, Best Soundtrack (2006) |

After release, the game was met with "generally positive" reviews—an aggregate score of 87 of 100 based on 64 reviews—according to the review aggregator website Metacritic. Similarly, GameRankings calculated a 87.5% score based on 72 reviews. Like its predecessors, the gameplay received mixed reviews. The updates to the combat system were praised, with the drive forms, limit breaks, and combos being said to add depth, variety, and excitement. Andrew Reiner of Game Informer called the combo potential "divine", claiming that it surpassed God of War's intensity. (Note: Multiple sources:) Carrie Gouskos of GameSpot and Luke Albiges of Eurogamer highlighted the game's range of customization, with Gouskos saying that it allowed for both deep and shallow gameplay experiences. Reiner described the controls as "dynamic", writing that they instill feelings of confidence and comfort. Gouskos and IGN's Jeff Haynes criticized the combat's decreased difficulty, with Haynes remarking that the effectiveness of basic attacks sidelined offensive magic, and observed that the large amount of health orbs released by enemies during battle rendered healing items redundant. However, Gouskos regarded the approach to be an improvement upon the original game, which she felt derived difficulty from "backtracking, tediousness, and confusion". Louis Bedigian of GameZone also concluded that the game would not be challenging to players experienced with action RPGs from the 1990s. Patrick Gann of RPGFan deemed the partner artificial intelligence superior to the first game's, whereas Haynes denounced it as "absolutely terrible", which he attributed to the lack of ability to issue AI commands.

The quick time events were a generally welcomed addition, with Albiges regarding their quality and impact to be on par with the knife fight scene in Resident Evil 4. (Note: Multiple sources:) Bedigian declared the game as the first instance of quick time events successfully implemented and admired the resulting actions as "some of the most beautiful polygon sequences seen on PlayStation 2." While Russ Fischer of GameRevolution deemed their lenient mechanics compared to God of War to be a saving grace, he and Gann acknowledged that the lack of skill required for their execution may be a drawback for hardcore gamers. Bryan Intihar and Shane Bettenhausen of EGM spoke positively of the boss fights, with Bettenhausen saying that the quick time events enhanced their dynamic feeling. Eric Bratcher of GamesRadar+ was also excited by the boss battles, though considered a few "straight-up lame". Gouskos described the bosses as interesting and well conceived but felt that the strategies for defeating them are too similar to those against regular enemies.

Reviewers complimented the camera's increased responsiveness, which Haynes attributed to the use of the right thumbstick. (Note: Multiple sources:) Contrariwise, Gerald Villoria of GameSpy and Gann did not see any improvement, with Villoria occasionally struggling with forced and awkward camera positions. James Mielke (writing for EGM) and Gann dismissed the first-person mode as unhelpful, with Mielke warning that the inability to see Sora's Keyblade was disorienting.

The RPG elements were described as light, with Haynes calling them a "casualty" of the increased emphasis on combat; he remarked that items were "practically useless" due to a lack of need to use them in certain places as in the first game. Although Albiges considered the quality of the locales to be consistently high (singling out Port Royal for praise), others lamented the decreased size and increased linearity of the worlds, with Haynes particularly describing Halloween Town and Atlantica as "shadows of their former selves". While the assortment of minigames in the Hundred Acre Wood was said to be improved from the first game, the transition of Atlantica from an action set-piece to a series of rhythm minigames was derided. Bratcher and Gann were relieved by the absence of the scavenger hunt-type quests from the first game.

The Gummi Ship segments were widely agreed to be an improvement over those of the first game. (Note: Multiple sources:) Comparisons were drawn to Star Fox, Panzer Dragoon, Gradius, R-Type, Einhänder, and the recent works of Cave. Although Gouskos and PALGN's Phil Larsen acknowledged the improved execution, they were overall unimpressed; Larsen singled out the battle against a giant pirate ship as a highlight though. Villoria considered the updates to the shipbuilding interface great improvements, whereas Fischer and Gann still found it obtuse and confusing.

Responses to the narrative were varied, with some reviewers cautioning that the plot would be confusing to those who had not played the previous games. (Note: Multiple sources:) Haynes, however, assured that the Journal feature provided sufficient context, and added that it had been improved from the first game. Proponents of the story include Intihar, Bedigian, and Gann, with Bedigian declaring that the game "should be the benchmark of RPG storytelling". Villoria and Gann said that the frequent cameos were well-handled, and pointed out that the inclusion of Square characters not created by Nomura was an interesting risk, though Mielke occasionally felt that the cameos were excessive. Gann considered the plot to be more cohesive than that of the first, as the Disney worlds held more relevance to the story. Reiner promised that the story would "give you shivers and make your heart leap" despite not being as powerful as the first game. Mielke complimented Nomura's "eye for epic drama" previously observed in Final Fantasy VII: Advent Children, which he said "touches you where games like, say, God of War never will". Gouskos said that the interactions with the frequently changing cast of characters made up for the game's lack of challenge. Bettenhausen faulted what he perceived to be a clumsy blend of the serious Square-style narrative and whimsical Disney worlds. Larsen deemed several lines and scenes unnecessary, and noted a tendency of the characters' more serious speeches to take on an obscure "Matrix sequel-esque" quality. Fischer, likening the general plot to "a long episode of Quantum Leap with permanent guest stars Donald and Goofy", described the storyline as linear and somewhat nonsensical, but "endearing and twisty" enough to hold players' attention. Bettenhausen and GamePro's Bones regarded the prologue as dull and slow, though Reiner lauded its "devilish" plot twist for potentially casting doubt on a desire for Sora's return. Reiner and Fischer were disappointed by the amount of recycled Disney content from the first game; Reiner, describing most of the Disney-based conflicts as "tacked on" diversions, suggested that Disney restricted Square Enix's ability to create new content.

==== Audiovisuals ====
The visuals were lauded, with Mielke and Albiges considering them among the PlayStation 2's best, and Villoria putting them on par with Square's best productions. (Note: Multiple sources:) The environmental renderings were praised, with special mention going to the Space Paranoids, Timeless River, and Port Royal worlds. (Note: Multiple sources:) The character models and animations were complimented; (Note: Multiple sources:) Villoria and Gann singled out the Pirates of the Caribbean characters for their realistic quality, and Gann declared the facial designs to be the best he had seen on the PlayStation 2. Haynes admired the main characters' changing appearance depending on the world they are visiting, and Villoria noted that the enemies were also visually adapted to their environments, which he said granted them personality. The full-motion videos were admired by Albiges, Gann, and Bedigian, and compared by Gann to those of Final Fantasy XII. Gann was also impressed by the special effects applied in the dream sequences during the prologue, and claimed to be impacted by the "artistic flair that combined the binary/data/static effect with the heartfelt scenes from the first title".

Reviewers praised the soundtrack, which Bedigian described as "An impeccable, unforgettable mixture of classic Disney tracks and new Square Enix themes". (Note: Multiple sources:) He added that despite the limited nostalgic value of the Disney tunes, they "never get tiring, slightly repetitive, or seem out of place". Gouskos remarked that the presence of some songs from The Little Mermaid were the redeeming quality of the Atlantica rhythm minigames, and she considered the music's infectiousness to be "a tribute to how well the music was adapted and integrated into the gameplay". Larsen only criticized some repetitiveness, but noted that the fast-paced action made this hardly noticeable. However, Villoria and Gann were less than impressed; Villoria felt that the soundtrack did not meet the high standard set by the first game, while Gann complained of the synth quality and recycled tracks from the first game. Gann considered the live orchestral and piano recordings to be the best tracks. Mielke (writing for 1Up.com) and Larsen spoke positively of the theme song "Sanctuary", with Mielke calling it "a sublime contribution that grows with each listen" and Larsen deeming it to "have been perfectly crafted to both set and build from the atmosphere of the game". Gann, however, faulted what he perceived to be a rushed localization from the equivalent Japanese track "Passion". He elaborated that "Full harmonic backup parts have been cut, and Utada's stand-alone melody sounds flat in English. She stretches syllables to make up for the bouncy melody of the very syllabic Japanese version".

The voice acting was generally commended for its quality and the prestige of its cast. (Note: Multiple sources:) Christopher Lee's presence in particular was singled out as commanding and show-stealing. Gouskos called the overall quality "excellent" and felt the use of lines from the original Disney films enhanced the sense of immersion; although she identified "one or two bad apples among the bunch", describing Jasmine as "screechy". Additionally, she noted that the Square characters were not given an equal level of treatment, describing their dialogue as "aloof"; she singled out a scene in which Seifer declares "We totally owned you lamers!". Larsen praised the voice actors' effort but said that the cutscenes felt longer than they are due to the timing of the spoken dialogue. Haynes felt that many lines fell flat and the incorporation of film dialogue was awkward. Mielke and Bratcher respectively deemed Mena Suvari's performance as Aerith "pretty dry" and "all wrong". The absence of the actors from Pirates of the Caribbean was a source of disappointment, with EGM editors describing the sound-alike actor for Jack Sparrow as "iffy at best".

=== Accolades ===
Soon after release, Kingdom Hearts II received numerous awards and distinctions through 2006. Reviewers for Japanese gaming magazine Famitsu rated it a near-perfect score (39/40). It tied with Resident Evil 4 as Famitsu's "Game of the Year" 2005. Famitsu readers ranked the game 29th in the publication's "All Time Top 100" feature in 2006. G4 awarded Kingdom Hearts II "Best Voice Over" and "Best Soundtrack" in its 2006 G-Phoria awards show. The International Press Academy named Kingdom Hearts II the "Outstanding Game Based on Existing Medium" at the 11th Satellite Awards. Electronic Gaming Monthly staff awarded it "Best Sequel" of 2006. Editors for Eurogamer and Game Informer included Kingdom Hearts II on their respective lists of "Top 50 Games of 2006": it was listed as number 34 on Eurogamer's feature, whereas the Game Informer piece was unranked. Additionally, Game Informer staff named Square Enix the second top developer and sixth top publisher of 2006 in part for its work on Kingdom Hearts II. It was the top game on IGN's 2006 "Reader's Choice" for PlayStation 2 games. PlayStation Magazine editors ranked the game seventh in the magazine's top ten of 2006.

Publications continued to bestow accolades on the game after 2006. VideoGamer.com staff featured Kingdom Hearts II tenth in their article about the "Top 10 Role playing games" for the 2007 holiday shopping season. In two lists during 2008, the editors of GamePro named it the 15th best PlayStation 2 game, citing the improvements over the first game, and the 25th best RPG title of all time for exceeding their expectations. In 2020, Dengeki PlayStation's Suzutaku listed Kingdom Hearts II Final Mix as a life-changing game in the magazine's feature of the all-time best PlayStation software. The game was ranked the sixteenth greatest console video game in a Japanese poll, which surveyed over 50,000 respondents, conducted in 2021 by TV Asahi.

== See also ==
- List of Disney video games
