= Space Travelers: The Animation =

- Space Travelers: The Animation promo poster
- スペース・トラベラーズ The Animation
- Directed by: Takashi Ui
- Written by: Katsuhiko Koide
- Story by: Katsuyuki Motohiro
- Based on: Space Travelers, 2000 film
- Produced by: Masayuki Miyashita; Shuji Abe; Yutaro Kawamura
- Starring: Shinichiro Miki; Banjou Ginga; Hideki Ogihara; Kotono Mitsuishi; Shigeru Chiba; Shinobu Adachi; Takaco Kato; Yutaka Aoyama
- Edited by: Keiichiro Mochizuki
- Music by: Toshiyuki Watanabe
- Production companies: Fuji Television Network; Robot Films
- Distributed by: Media Blasters
- Release date: June 23, 2000
- Running time: 60 minutes
- Country: Japan
- Language: Japanese

Space Travelers: The Animation (スペース・トラベラーズ The Animation, Supesutoraberaz The Animation) is a 2000 science fiction and action Japanese straight to video full-length animated film produced by Fuji Television Network and Robot Films. The anime ties back to 2000's live action comedy film Space Travelers directed by Katsuyuki Motohiro, also produced by Fuji Television Network and Robot Films.

== Plot ==
In the New Cosmic Century 038, humanity is suddenly attacked by a mysterious alien civilization known as the Orbital Ring System. Soon, the entire Earth Civilization Sphere has been cut off from the space colonies, and is under the control of the ORS. Only Hayabusa Jetter, along with his band of misfit space pirates and smugglers, can break through ORS lines.

Aiding an underground resistance movement, the Space Travellers risk their lives to transport vital supplies to and from Earth. One day, however, a mysterious gentleman hires them to deliver an unmarked spherical container. Hayabusa accepts the mission, with no idea that this simple package may hold the key to mankind's destiny!

== Cast ==
=== Original Japanese cast ===
- Shinichiro Miki as Hayabusa Jetter
- Takaco Kato as Irene Pair
- Banjou Ginga as Crush Bomber
- Hideki Ogihara as Black Cat
- Kotono Mitsuishi as Gold Papillon
- Shigeru Chiba as Hoi
- Shinobu Adachi as Tanner
- Mahito Tsujimura as Electric Sunny
- Yutaka Aoyama as Dragon Attack
- Hisayoshi Izaki as Karl Hendrix
- Yuji Ueda as Frank
- Unshou Ishizuka as Henry
- Katsunosuke Hori as Faron
- Kiyoyuki Yanada as Ronson
- Yuki Matsuda as Announcement 1
- Mie Odagi as Announcement 2
- Tomomichi Nishimura as Tasker

=== English dub cast ===
- Crispin Freeman as Jetter
- Debora Rabbai as Irene
- J. David Brimmer as Crush Bomber
- Jimmy Zoppi as Black Cat
- Meg Francis as Papillion
- Eddie Paul as Hoi
- Megan Hollingshead as Turner
- Chunky Mon as Sunny
- Chiam Figeroa Drumyode as Dragon Attack
- Allan Smithee as Carl
- Buddy Woodward as Frank
- Christopher Nicholas as Henry
- Steve Bednarz as Professor Falon
- Pete Zarustica as Lawson
- Chiam Figeroa Drumyode as Narrator
- Simone Grant as Announcer
- Christopher Nicholas as Squad Leader

== Production ==
Space Travelers: The Animation began as a throwaway gag in Katsuyuki Motohiro's popular 2000 live-action movie Space Travelers, in which a Tokyo bank robbery goes disastrously wrong. As the police surround the building, the staff and hostages volunteer to help the robbers bluff their way out; each is given a code name based on a character from the robbers favorite cartoon, a nonexistent show called Space Travelers-hence the large cast of anime archetypes. Scraps of animation were made as inserts for the original movie and are reused here-hence the strange pacing of the overlong opening credits that were not originally intended to be shown in this manner. An afterthought following the movie's success, Space Travelers was reputedly inspired by Motohiro's love of Star Blazers, Gundam, and Evangelion.

=== Japanese staff ===
- Character Design: Mitsuru Bakuto
- Animation Director: Noboru Takahashi, Takao Shizuno, Toshi Shishikura, Toyoaki Nakajima, Yoshihiro Matsumoto
- Producer: Hirotsugu Usui, Kenichiro Zaizen, Toru Horibe
- Animation producer: Keiichiro Mochizuki
- Assistant Director: Takayuki Inagaki
- Orchestra Conductor: Sakae Sakakibara
- Production Design: Yoshihiro Kamikubo
- Visual Design: Takashi Okazaki

== Distribution ==
Space Travelers: The Animation English version was distributed by Media Blasters for the North American release of the anime. Both DVD and VHS copies of the English dubbed version was released on September 25, 2001.

=== English staff ===
- ADR Director: Crispin Freeman
- Translation: Julia Rose
- Executive producer: John Sirabella
- ADR Engineer: Gary Solomon
- Editing: Beth Salem
- Graphic Design: Merideth Mulroney
- Mixing: Joe Digiorgi
- Production Assistant: Anna Yamamoto
- Production manager: Scott Marchfeld
- Production Supervision: Joe Digiorgi, Sean Molyneaux
- Script Adaptation: Crispin Freeman

== See also ==
- Space Travelers, 2000 film
