= Space travel =

Space travel can refer to:

- Spaceflight, flying into or through outer space
- Spacefaring, to be capable of and active in space travel
- Human spaceflight, space travel with a crew or passengers
- Interplanetary spaceflight, travel between planets
- Interstellar travel, hypothetical travel between stars or planetary systems
- Intergalactic travel, hypothetical travel between galaxies
- Space Travel (video game), developed by Ken Thompson in 1969
- Space travel in science fiction
- German Space Travel Exhibition, museum in Morgenröthe-Rautenkranz in Saxony, Germany
