= Music of Final Fantasy III =

Music from the video game Final Fantasy III

The music of the video game Final Fantasy III was composed by regular series composer Nobuo Uematsu. Final Fantasy III Original Sound Version, a compilation of almost all of the music in the game, was released by Square Co./NTT Publishing in 1991, and subsequently re-released by NTT Publishing in 1994 and 2004. The soundtrack to the remake of Final Fantasy III for the Nintendo DS, Final Fantasy III Original Soundtrack was released by NTT Publishing in 2006, with revamped versions of the tracks and additional tracks. A vocal arrangement album entitled Final Fantasy III Yūkyū no Kaze Densetsu, or literally Final Fantasy III Legend of the Eternal Wind, contained a selection of musical tracks from the game. The tracks were performed by Nobuo Uematsu and Dido, a duo composed of Michiaki Kato and Sizzle Ohtaka. The album was released by Data M in 1990 and by Polystar in 1994.

The music received positive reviews from critics, and is lauded as one of the best soundtracks of any NES game. Several pieces from the soundtrack remain popular today, and have been performed numerous times in Final Fantasy orchestral concert series such as the Tour de Japon: Music from Final Fantasy concert series and the Distant Worlds - Music from Final Fantasy series. Music from the game has also been published in arranged albums and compilations by Square as well as outside groups.

== Final Fantasy III Original Sound Version ==
Final Fantasy III Original Sound Version

Soundtrack album by Nobuo Uematsu
- Released: July 15, 1991; November 26, 1994 (re-release); October 1, 2004 (re-release)
- Length: 54:24
- Label: Square Co./NTT Publishing; NTT Publishing (re-release)

Final Fantasy III Original Sound Version is a soundtrack album of video game music from Final Fantasy III. The album contains the musical tracks from the game, composed by Nobuo Uematsu. It spans 44 tracks and covers a duration of 54:24. It was released on July 15, 1991, by Square and NTT Publishing. Final Fantasy III has been described as the game in which Uematsu's musical style "began to take a more definite form". Many of the tracks in the soundtrack use "cascading rhythms" in both the foreground and background sounds, as well as a bass rhythm, pushing the limited sound hardware of the Nintendo Entertainment System further than in Final Fantasy II.

The tunes range in style, including "jazzy" and "new age", and in tempo from slow, somber pieces to more upbeat rhythms. Including the smaller pieces not included in the original soundtrack, Final Fantasy III contained twice as many pieces as the soundtrack to Final Fantasy II. The original release bears the catalog number N23D-002. It was re-released on November 26, 1994 and again on October 1, 2004 by NTT Publishing under the catalog numbers PSCN-5013 and NTCP-5013, respectively.

Final Fantasy III Original Sound Version sold over 5,300 copies, and was well received by critics. Ben Schweitzer of RPGFan felt that it was "one of the strongest soundtracks" of any NES game, a sentiment that Patrick Gann of RPGFan agreed with. Gann further declared the main theme "Eternal Wind" to "quite possibly be the best world map music" in a video game. Jon Turner of Soundtrack Central felt that, although the sound limitations of the album detracted it in the eyes of many listeners, the album was still well worth the purchase. Dave of Square Enix Music Online, however, disagreed, feeling that, although it was "charming", it was "one of the weaker Final Fantasy albums".

Track listing
No.	Title	Japanese title	Length
1.	"The Prelude"	プレリュード (Pureryūdo)	0:48
2.	"Crystal Cave ("Cave Where the Crystal Is")"	クリスタルのある洞窟 (Kurisutaru no aru Dōkutsu)	1:40
3.	"Battle 1 ~ Fanfare"	バトル1～ファンファーレ (Batoru 1 ~ Fanfāre)	1:53
4.	"Crystal Room"	クリスタルルーム (Kurisutaru Rūmu)	0:28
5.	"Opening Theme"	オープニングテーマ (Ōpuningu Tēma)	1:26
6.	"My Home Town ("Hometown Ur")"	故郷の街ウル (Kokyō no Machi Uru)	1:43
7.	"Eternal Wind"	悠久の風 (Yūkyū no Kaze)	2:06
8.	"Jinn, the Fire ("Djinn's Curse")"	ジンの呪い (Jin no Noroi)	1:14
9.	"The Dungeon"	ダンジョン (Danjon)	1:07
10.	"Return of the Warrior ("Return of the Hero")"	勇者の帰還 (Yūsha no Kikan)	1:02
11.	"The Way to the Top"	山頂への道 (Sanchō e no Michi)	0:41
12.	"Cute Little Tozas ("Village of Little People, Tozas")"	小人の村トーザス (Kobito no Mura Tōzasu)	1:00
13.	"Shrine of Nept"	ネプト神殿 (Neputo Shinden)	0:57
14.	"Sailing Enterprise ("Enterprise Sails the Ocean")"	エンタープライズ海を行く (Entāpuraizu Umi o Yuku)	1:01
15.	"Living Forest"	生きている森 (Ikiteiru Mori)	0:43
16.	"Time Remains ("Village of the Ancients")"	古代人の村 (Kodaijin no Mura)	1:45
17.	"Chocobos! ("Chocobo's Theme")"	チョコボのテーマ (Chokobo no Tēma)	0:38
18.	"Big Chocobo! ("Fat Chocobo Uncovered")"	でぶチョコボあらわる (Debu Chokobo Arawaru)	0:28
19.	"Tower of Owen"	オーエンの塔 (Ōen no Tō)	1:04
20.	"Veggies of Geasal ("Gysahl Greens")"	ギサールの野菜 (Gisāru no Yasai)	0:44
21.	"Castle of Hain"	ハインの城 (Hain no Shiro)	1:22
22.	"Battle 2"	バトル2 (Batoru 2)	1:39
23.	"The Requiem"	レクイエム (Rekuiemu)	0:37
24.	"Go Above the Clouds! ("The Enterprise Flies Through the Sky")"	エンタープライズ空を飛ぶ (Entāpuraizu Sora o Tobu)	0:44
25.	"The Boundless Ocean"	果てしなき大海原 (Hateshinaki Ōunabara)	1:17
26.	"Elia, the Maiden of Water"	水の巫子エリア (Mizu no Miko Eria)	1:21
27.	"Town of Water ("Town of Amur")"	アムルの街 (Amuru no Machi)	1:06
28.	"Let's Play the Piano! ("Piano Practice 1")"	ピアノのおけいこ1 (Piano no Okeiko 1)	0:11
29.	"Let's Play the Piano Again! ("Piano Practice 2")"	ピアノのおけいこ2 (Piano no Okeiko 2)	0:06
30.	"Swift Twist"	スイフト・ツイスト (Suifuto Tsuisuto)	0:38
31.	"Good Ol' Fellows ("Theme of the Four Old Guys")"	4人組じいさんのテーマ (Yonin-gumi Jī-san no Tēma)	0:34
32.	"In the Covert Town ("Hidden Town of Falgabard")"	隠れ村ファルガバード (Kakure Mura Farugabādo)	1:00
33.	"Salonia ("Giant Metropolis Salonia")"	巨大都市サロニア (Kyodai Toshi Saronia)	1:40
34.	"Deep Under the Water ("The Submarine Nautilus")"	潜水艇ノーチラス (Sensuitei Nōchirasu)	1:53
35.	"Beneath the Horizon ("Undersea Shrine")"	海底神殿 (Kaitei Shinden)	1:25
36.	"Let Me Know the Truth ("Doga and Unne's Home")"	ドーガとウネの館 (Dōga to Une no Yakata)	0:55
37.	"Lute of Noah"	ノアのリュート (Noa no Ryūto)	0:20
38.	"Good Morning! ("Unne's Morning Exercise")"	ウネの体操 (Une no Taisō)	0:30
39.	"The Invincible ("Giant Battleship Invincible")"	巨大戦艦インビンシブル (Kyodai Senkan Inbinshiburu)	1:24
40.	"Forbidden Land ("Forbidden Land Eureka")"	禁断の地エウレカ (Kindan no Chi Eureka)	0:49
41.	"The Crystal Tower"	クリスタルタワー (Kurisutaru Tawā)	1:14
42.	"The Dark Crystals"	闇のクリスタル (Yami no Kurisutaru)	1:43
43.	"This is the Last Battle ("Final Struggle to the Death")"	最後の死闘 (Saigo no Shitō)	2:21
44.	"The Everlasting World ("Ending Theme")"	エンディング・テーマ (Endingu Tēma)	6:44

== Final Fantasy III Yūkyū no Kaze Densetsu ==
Final Fantasy III Yūkyū no Kaze Densetsu

Soundtrack album by Nobuo Uematsu
- Released: May 25, 1990; March 25, 1994 (re-release)
- Length: 52:32
- Label: DataM; Polystar (re-release)

Final Fantasy III Yūkyū no Kaze Densetsu (ファイナルファンタジーIII 悠久の風伝説, Fainaru Fantajī Surī Yūkyū no Kaze Densetsu; lit. Final Fantasy III Legend of the Eternal Wind) is an arranged album containing a selection of vocal and arranged musical tracks from the game interspersed with English narration of a story similar to Final Fantasy III. The songs were performed by Nobuo Uematsu and sung by Dido, a duo composed of Michiaki Kato and Sizzle Ohtaka. The tunes have been described as being in the Romantic music style, with a slow feeling to them. The seven tracks of the album span several genres, including orchestral tracks, tribal themes, and vocal tracks, and cover a duration of 52:32. The album was first released on May 25, 1990 by Data M and subsequently re-released on March 25, 1994 by Polystar. The original release bears the catalog number PSCX-1005, and the re-release bears the catalog number PSCR-5252.

Final Fantasy III Yuukyuu no Kaze Densetsu sold over 32,000 copies, and was received positively by critics, with Patrick Gann declaring that it was worth "searching long and hard" for the album. Ben Martin, Jason Strohmaier, and Aaron Lau of Soundtrack Central all agreed, finding the songs to be varied and interesting, though each added that the narration seriously detracted from the album. Dave of Square Enix Music Online also found the narration to be a flaw of the album, but termed it overall to be "a great effort from Nobuo Uematsu".

Track listing
No.	Title	Japanese title	Length
1.	"The Evil Power of the Underworld (Evil Quickening)"	邪悪の胎動 (Jāku no Taidō)	6:39
2.	"Following the Wind (Apocalypse of Wind)"	風の啓示 (Kaze no Keiji)	8:56
3.	"Montage (Wandering Journey)"	彷徨の旅路 (Hōkō no Tabiji)	8:49
4.	"Their Spiritual Leader (Its Great Guidance)"	その大いなる導き (Sono Ōinaru Michibiki)	9:28
5.	"Ebb and Flow (The Balance of Yin and Yang)"	陰と陽の攻防 (In to Yō no Kōbō)	5:14
6.	"The Dark Cloud (A Wicked Craving)"	凶々しき渇望 (Magamagashiki Katsubō)	4:15
7.	"Rebirth (A New World)"	新たなる世界 (Aratanaru Sekai)	9:05

== Final Fantasy III Original Soundtrack ==
Final Fantasy III Original Soundtrack

Soundtrack album by Nobuo Uematsu
- Released: September 20, 2006
- Length: 70:56 (CD); 28:24 (DVD)
- Label: Square Enix

Final Fantasy III Original Soundtrack is a soundtrack released for the remake of Final Fantasy III for the Nintendo DS. The album contains the original tracks from the game rearranged by Tsuyoshi Sekito and Keiji Kawamori for the DS system, as well as two remixes, one from The Black Mages and the other by Yasuhiro Yamanaka, the synth operator for the soundtrack. The album also included a DVD containing the opening full motion video sequence of the game, a promotional video, and an interview with the game's staff. It was released on September 20, 2006 by Square Enix and bears the catalog numbers SQEX-10076~7. The soundtrack disc contains 61 tracks and covers a duration of 70:56, while the DVD's three tracks have a length of 28:24.

Final Fantasy III Original Soundtrack sold over 17,800 copies. It received mixed reviews from critics, with Patrick Gann declaring that "even if you own the original Famicom version's soundtrack, there is plenty of reason to own this soundtrack alongside it", while Richard of Square Enix Music Online found it to be a "passable" album, but "mostly forgettable".

Track listing

CD
No.	Title	Japanese title	Length
1.	"Memory of the Wind ~Legend of the Eternal Wind~"	風の追憶 ～悠久の風伝説～ (Kaze no Tsuioku ~Yūkyū no Kaze Densetsu~)	3:01
2.	"Prelude"	プレリュード (Pureryūdo)	0:56
3.	"The Cave Where the Crystal Lies"	クリスタルのある洞窟 (Kurisutaru no aru Dōkutsu)	1:13
4.	"Battle 1"	バトル1 (Batoru 1)	1:32
5.	"Victory"	勝利 (Shōri)	0:32
6.	"Crystal Room"	クリスタルルーム (Kurisutaru Rūmu)	0:32
7.	"Opening Theme"	オープニング・テーマ (Ōpuningu Tēma)	1:52
8.	"Hometown of Ur"	故郷の街ウル (Kokyō no Machi Uru)	1:29
9.	"Eternal Wind"	悠久の風 (Yūkyū no Kaze)	1:41
10.	"Jinn's Curse"	ジンの呪い (Jin no Noroi)	1:10
11.	"Dungeon"	ダンジョン (Danjon)	0:55
12.	"Return of the Hero"	勇者の帰還 (Yūsha no Kikan)	0:53
13.	"Road to the Summit"	山頂への道 (Sanchō e no Michi)	1:28
14.	"Tozas"	トーザス (Tōzasu)	1:02
15.	"Nepto Shrine"	ネプト神殿 (Neputo Shinden)	0:51
16.	"Sailing the Enterprise"	エンタープライズ海を行く (Entāpuraizu Umi o Yuku)	1:15
17.	"Living Forest"	生きている森 (Ikiteiru Mori)	0:55
18.	"Village of the Ancients"	古代人の村 (Kodaijin no Mura)	1:51
19.	"Chocobo Theme"	チョコボのテーマ (Chokobo no Tēma)	0:45
20.	"Fat Chocobo Appears"	でぶチョコボあらわる (Debu Chokbo Arawaru)	0:54
21.	"Tower of Owen"	オーエンの塔 (Ōen no Tō)	0:52
22.	"Gishal's Veggies"	ギサールの野菜 (Gisāru no Yasai)	0:37
23.	"Hyne's Castle"	ハインの城 (Hain no Shiro)	1:14
24.	"Dangerous Short Music 1"	危険なショートミュージック1 (Kiken na Shōto Myūjikku 1)	0:35
25.	"Dangerous Short Music 2"	危険なショートミュージック2 (Kiken na Shōto Myūjikku 2)	0:33
26.	"Dangerous Short Music 3"	危険なショートミュージック3 (Kiken na Shōto Myūjikku 3)	0:23
27.	"Battle 2"	バトル2 (Batoru 2)	1:44
28.	"Requiem"	レクイエム (Rekuiemu)	0:35
29.	"Flying the Enterprise"	エンタープライズ空を飛ぶ (Entāpuraizu Sora o Tobu)	1:10
30.	"The Boundless Ocean"	果てしなき大海原 (Hateshinaki Ōunabara)	1:22
31.	"Elia, the Maiden of Water"	水の巫女エリア (Mizu no Miko Eria)	2:05
32.	"Town of Amur"	アムルの街 (Amuru no Machi)	1:25
33.	"Piano Practice 1"	ピアノのおけいこ1 (Piano no Okeiko 1)	0:12
34.	"Piano Practice 2"	ピアノのおけいこ2 (Piano no Okeiko 2)	0:07
35.	"Swift Twist"	スイフト・ツイスト (Suifuto Tsuisuto)	0:35
36.	"Rest at the Inn"	宿屋で寝る (Yadoya de Neru)	0:10
37.	"A Comrade Joins"	仲間を加える (Nakama o Kuwaeru)	0:09
38.	"A Comrade Leaves"	仲間との別れ (Nakama to no Wakare)	0:09
39.	"A Dancer's Dance"	踊り子のダンス (Odoriko no Dansu)	0:16
40.	"Item Get"	アイテムゲット (Aitemu Getto)	0:07
41.	"Garuda Defeated"	ガルーダ撃破 (Garūda Gekiha)	0:10
42.	"Theme of the Four Old Men"	4人組じいさんのテーマ (Yonin-gumi Jī-san no Tēma)	0:51
43.	"The Hidden Village of Fargabaad"	隠れ村ファルガバード (Kakure Mura Farugabādo)	1:24
44.	"The Megalopolis of Salonia"	巨大都市サロニア (Kyodai Toshi Saronia)	1:05
45.	"The Submarine Nautilus"	潜水艦ノーチラス (Sensuikan Nōchirasu)	1:18
46.	"Underwater Temple"	海底神殿 (Kaitei Shinden)	1:09
47.	"Dorga and Unne's Mansion"	ドーガとウネの館 (Dōga to Une no Yakata)	1:05
48.	"Noah's Lute"	ノアのリュート (Noa no Ryūto)	0:35
49.	"Unne's Exercises"	ウネの体操 (Une no Taisō)	0:31
50.	"The Huge Battleship Invincible"	巨大戦艦インビンシブル (Kyodai Senkan Inbinshiburu)	0:55
51.	"The Forbidden Land Eureka"	禁断の地エウレカ (Kindan no Chi Eureka)	1:15
52.	"Crystal Tower"	クリスタルタワー (Kurisutaru Tawā)	1:05
53.	"The Dark Crystals"	闇のクリスタル (Yami no Kurisutaru)	1:03
54.	"The Final Battle -1-"	最後の死闘-1- (Saigo no Shitō -1-)	0:37
55.	"The Final Battle -2-"	最後の死闘-2- (Saigo no Shitō -2-)	0:26
56.	"The Final Battle -3-"	最後の死闘-3- (Saigo no Shitō -3-)	1:22
57.	"Ending Theme -1-"	エンディング・テーマ-1- (Endingu Tēma -1-)	1:24
58.	"Ending Theme -2-"	エンディング・テーマ-2- (Endingu Tēma -2-)	2:50
59.	"Ending Theme -3-"	エンディング・テーマ-3- (Endingu Tēma -3-)	3:44
60.	"Eternal Wind -.333 mix-"	悠久の風 -.333 mix- (Yūkyū no Kaze -.333 mix-)	3:36
61.	"The Final Battle -THE BLACK MAGES Ver.-"	最後の死闘 -THE BLACK MAGES Ver.- (Saigo no Shitō -THE BLACK MAGES ver.-)	4:55

DVD
No.	Title	Japanese title	Length
1.	"Opening Movie"	Ōpuningu Mūbi
2.	"On Sale Promotion Video"	Hatsubaiki Puromōshon Bideo
3.	"Special Interview ~Final Fantasy III Anecdote~"	Supesharu Intabyū ~FINAL FANTASY III Anecdote~

== Legacy ==
The Black Mages, a band led by Nobuo Uematsu that arranges music from Final Fantasy video games into a rock music style, have arranged two pieces from Final Fantasy III. These are "The Rocking Grounds" from the album The Skies Above, published in 2004, and "KURAYAMINOKUMO", a remix of "The Final Struggle", from Darkness and Starlight, published in 2008. Lyrical versions of "The Boundless Ocean" and "Elia, the Maiden of Water", sung by Risa Ohki, appeared on Final Fantasy: Pray, a compilation album produced by Square. Additionally, lyrical versions of "Eternal Wind" and "Cute Little Tozas", sung by Risa Ohki and Ikuko Noguchi, appeared on Final Fantasy: Love Will Grow.

The music of Final Fantasy III has also appeared in various official concerts and live albums, such as 20020220 music from FINAL FANTASY, a live recording of an orchestra performing music from the series including several pieces from the game. Additionally, "Elia, the Water Maiden" was performed as part of a medley by the Royal Stockholm Philharmonic Orchestra for the Distant Worlds - Music from Final Fantasy concert tour, while "Eternal Wind" and "Cute Little Tozas" were performed in a medley by the New Japan Philharmonic Orchestra in the Tour de Japon: Music from Final Fantasy concert series. The Black Mages performed "The Final Battle" at the Extra: Hyper Game Music Event 2007 concert in Tokyo on July 7, 2007. Independent but officially licensed releases of Final Fantasy III music have been composed by such groups as Project Majestic Mix, which focuses on arranging video game music. Selections also appear on Japanese remix albums, called dojin music, and on English remixing websites.
