= Music of the Final Fantasy VII series =

Music from the video games in the Final Fantasy VII series

Final Fantasy VII is a role-playing video game by Square (now Square Enix) as the seventh installment in the Final Fantasy series. Released in 1997, the game sparked the release of a collection of media centered on the game entitled the Compilation of Final Fantasy VII. The music of the Final Fantasy VII series includes not only the soundtrack to the original game and its associated albums, but also the soundtracks and music albums released for the other titles in the collection. The first album produced was Final Fantasy VII Original Soundtrack, a compilation of all the music in the game. It was released as a soundtrack album on four CDs by DigiCube in 1997. A selection of tracks from the album was released in the single-disc Reunion Tracks by DigiCube the same year. Piano Collections Final Fantasy VII, an album featuring piano arrangements of pieces from the soundtrack, was released in 2003 by DigiCube, and Square Enix began reprinting all three albums in 2004. To date, these are the only released albums based on the original game's soundtrack, and were solely composed by regular series composer Nobuo Uematsu; his role for the majority of subsequent albums has been filled by Masashi Hamauzu and Takeharu Ishimoto.

The Compilation of Final Fantasy VII began eight years after the release of Final Fantasy VII with the release of the animated film sequel Advent Children in 2005. The soundtracks for each of the titles in the collection are included in an album, starting with the album release of the soundtrack to Advent Children that year. The following year, Nippon Crown released a soundtrack album to correspond with the video game Dirge of Cerberus, while Square Enix launched a download-only collection of music from the multiplayer mode of the game, which was only released in Japan. After the launch of the game Crisis Core in 2007, Warner Music Japan produced the title's soundtrack. The latest album in the collection, Before Crisis: Final Fantasy VII & Last Order: Final Fantasy VII Original Soundtrack, was released by Square Enix the same year as a combined soundtrack album for the game Before Crisis and the animated movie Last Order.

The original music received highly positive reviews from critics, who found many of the tunes to be memorable and noted the emotional intensity of several of the tracks. The reception for the other albums has been mixed, with reactions ranging from enthusiastic praise to disappointment. Several pieces from the soundtrack, particularly "One-Winged Angel" and "Aeris' Theme", remain popular and have been performed numerous times in orchestral concert series such as Dear Friends: Music from Final Fantasy and Tour de Japon: Music from Final Fantasy. Music from the Original Soundtrack has been included in arranged albums and compilations by Square as well as outside groups.

== Creation and development ==
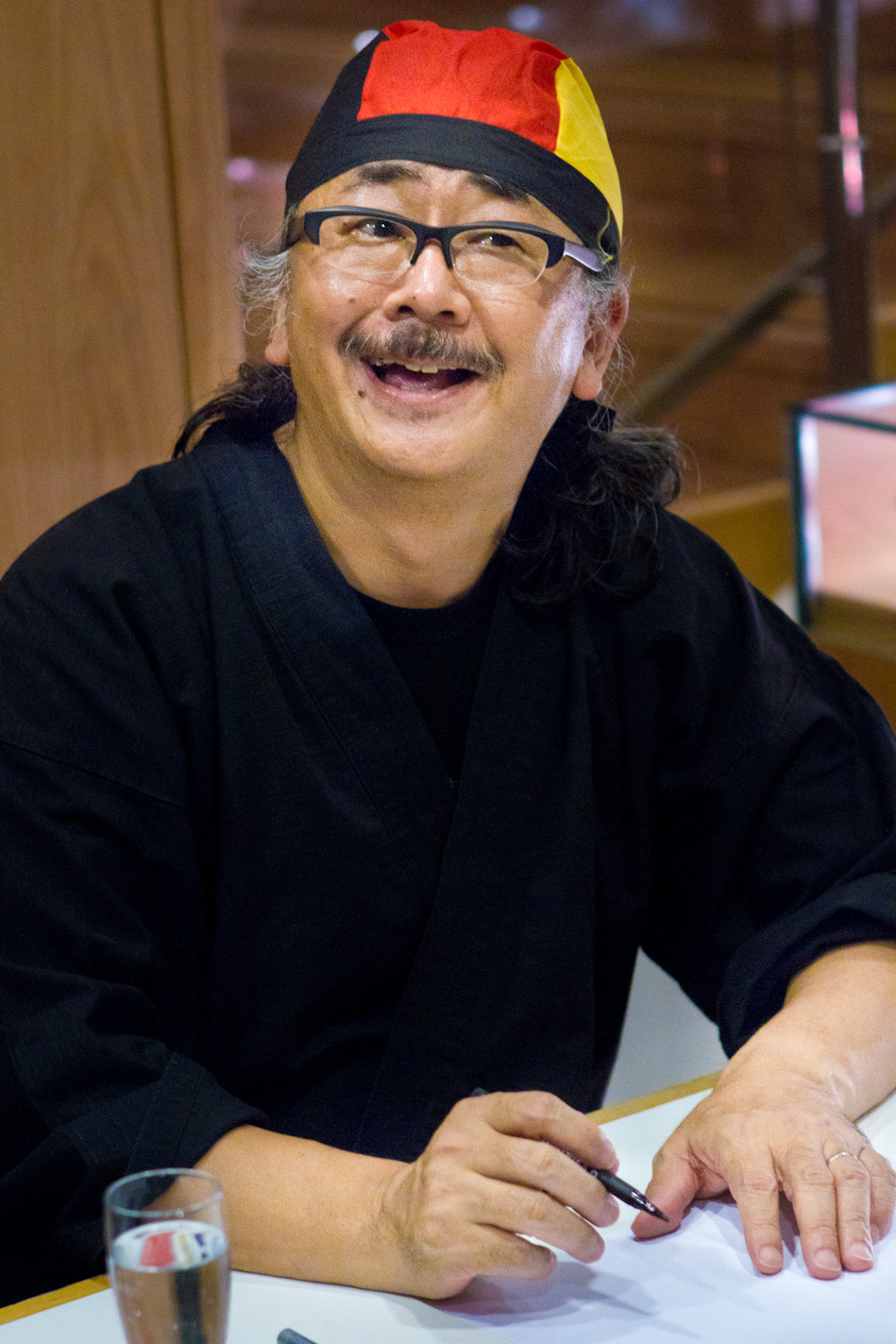
Final Fantasy VII was scored by the series' main composer Nobuo Uematsu.

Nobuo Uematsu composed the music of Final Fantasy VII in less than one year, matching the game's development time, although he took two years to create the music of Final Fantasy VI.

Final Fantasy VII was the series' first PlayStation game, and while the console could use pre-recorded Linear PCM (often as Red Book audio tracks on the compact disc), it was decided to synthesize the music in real time, using sample-based synthesis and note data. This decision has been credited for giving the soundtrack "a very distinctive mood and feel", forming a strong association for listeners between the game and its soundtrack. Uematsu had initially planned to use vocal performances for the game to take advantage of the console's capabilities, but found that the higher audio quality requirements made loading each game area much longer and not worth the effects on gameplay. However, after the release and seeing Suikoden II (1998, PlayStation), which had used higher-quality music instead, he reversed his stance for Final Fantasy VIII. There was a plan to use a "famous vocalist" for the ending theme to the game as a "theme song" for the game, but time constraints and thematic concerns, caused the idea to be dropped. Uematsu has claimed, however, that the move into the "PlayStation era", which allowed video game composers to use sounds recorded in the studio rather than from synthesizers, had "definitely been the biggest change" to video game music.

Uematsu's approach to composing the game's music was to treat it like a film soundtrack and compose songs that reflected the mood of the scenes rather than trying to make strong melodies to "define the game", as he felt that approach would come across too strong when placed alongside the game's new 3D visuals. As an example, he composed the track intended for the scene in the game where Aerith Gainsborough is killed to be "sad but beautiful", rather than more overtly emotional, creating what he feels is a more understated feeling. Uematsu has additionally said that the soundtrack has a feel of "realism", which also prevented him from using "exorbitant, crazy music". The first piece that Uematsu composed for the game was the opening theme; game director Yoshinori Kitase showed him the opening cinematic to the game and asked him to begin the project there. The track was well received in the company, which gave Uematsu "a sense that it was going to be a really good project". He later stated in the liner notes for the soundtrack album that the music for Final Fantasy VII was his "greatest harvest" to date.

Final Fantasy VII was the first game in the series to include a track with digitized vocals, "One-Winged Angel". The track has been called Uematsu's "most recognizable contribution" to the music of the Final Fantasy series, though the composer did not expect it to gain such popularity. The piece, described as "a fanfare to impending doom", is said to not "follow any normal genre rules" and has been termed "possibly the most innovative idea in the series' musical history". Uematsu approached the piece, which accompanies the final battle of the game, in a different manner than previous "boss tracks" as he felt that using his normal approach would cause unfavorable comparisons to his well-received Final Fantasy VI boss tracks. Inspired by The Rite of Spring by Igor Stravinsky to make a more "classical" track, and by rock and roll music from the late 1960s and early 1970s to make an orchestral track with a "destructive impact", he spent two weeks composing short unconnected musical phrases, and then arranged them together into a song, an approach he has never used before or since. The lyrics of "One-Winged Angel", a Latin choral track that plays at the climax of the game, were taken from the medieval poetry that forms the basis of Carl Orff's Carmina Burana, specifically "Estuans Interius", "O Fortuna", "Veni, Veni, Venias" and "Ave Formosissima". Uematsu has stated that the intro of "One-Winged Angel" is based on Jimi Hendrix's "Purple Haze", that the piece revolves around the image of Sephiroth, and that despite the chorus and orchestra, he still thinks of it as a "rock piece". He said in a 2005 interview that "One-Winged Angel" is his favorite tune from the soundtrack, and in 2004 that it was his favorite battle theme from any Final Fantasy game.

== Final Fantasy VII albums ==
=== Original Soundtrack ===
Final Fantasy VII Original Soundtrack

Soundtrack album by Nobuo Uematsu
- Released: February 10, 1997; May 10, 2004 (reissue)
- Recorded: Sound City, Tokyo
- Genres: Classical; rock
- Length: 70:56 (disc one); 64:20 (disc two); 69:45 (disc three); 68:26 (disc four); 279:53 (total)
- Labels: DigiCube; Square Enix (reissue)
- Producers: Nobuo Uematsu; Minoru Akao

Final Fantasy VII Original Soundtrack is a soundtrack album containing musical tracks from the game, composed by Nobuo Uematsu and produced by Uematsu and Minoru Akao. It was originally released on February 10, 1997 through DigiCube and later reissued directly by Square Enix on May 10, 2004. The soundtrack spans 85 tracks over four discs and has a combined duration of 4:39:53. A limited edition was produced along with the original album, containing illustrated liner notes with several pictures of Uematsu's workspace and personal effects, various cutscenes and in-game screen shots from the game, and a discography.

The soundtrack covers a wide variety of musical genres, including rock, techno, orchestral, and choral, although the soundtrack as a whole is primarily orchestral. While many of the tracks were intended as background music, reviewers noted the emotional intensity of several tracks, especially "Aerith's Theme", which plays during a moment described as "the most shocking moment in video games", and has been described as the most memorable track from the album. The theme has become popular among fans, and has inspired various arrangements. Other notable tracks include "Main Theme of Final Fantasy VII". Themes from this track play during several other tunes from the soundtrack, such as "Words Drowned by Fireworks", to tie the soundtrack together.

The regular edition of the album reached No. 3 on the Japan Oricon charts, while the limited edition reached No. 19. Overall, the album sold 148,000 copies as of January 2010, with the limited edition selling a further 21,000. The album was well received by critics. Allmusic awarded Uematsu's original soundtrack a five-star rating. Ben Schweitzer of RPGFan claimed that "for the most part, it's a diamond", with his primary complaint being the quality of the MIDI sound. He found the tracks to be "beautiful" and said that "One-Winged Angel" was "possibly the most innovative idea in the series' musical history". Patrick Gann of RPGFan concurred and found all of the soundtrack's tunes to be "memorable" and the Original Soundtrack to be "very worth the purchase". Philip of Square Enix Music Online, however, disliked the sound quality of the soundtrack and saw several tracks as "trivial", though he did note that Uematsu "has a flair for strong, memorable" pieces. In 2006, IGN ranked the album as the best Final Fantasy soundtrack to date and cited the "gripping" character themes and "One-Winged Angel" in particular as contributing factors. They also named "One-Winged Angel" as the best piece of music from the entire Final Fantasy series.

The original CDs for both releases were only published in Japan and include only Japanese track names. The official English track names were later added to digital releases of the soundtrack.

Track listing

Disc one
No.	Title	Length
1.	"The Prelude" (プレリュード Pureryūdo)	2:52
2.	"Opening - Bombing Mission" (オープニング~爆破ミッション Ōpuningu ~ Bakuha Misshon)	3:58
3.	"Mako Reactor" (魔晄炉 Makō Ro)	3:20
4.	"Anxiety" (不安な心 Fuan na Kokoro, lit. "Anxious Heart")	4:02
5.	"Tifa's Theme" (ティファのテーマ Tifa no Tēma)	5:06
6.	"Barret's Theme" (バレットのテーマ Baretto no Tēma)	3:27
7.	"Hurry!" (急げ! Isoge!)	2:29
8.	"Lurking in the Darkness" (闇に潜む Yami ni Hisomu)	2:33
9.	"Shinra, Inc" (神羅カンパニー Shinra Kanpanī, lit. "Shinra Company")	4:02
10.	"Let the Battles Begin!" (闘う者達 Tatakau Monotachi, lit. "Those Who Fight")	2:47
11.	"Fanfare" (ファンファーレ Fanfāre)	0:55
12.	"Flowers Blooming in the Church" (教会に咲く花 Kyōkai ni Saku Hana)	4:59
13.	"Turks' Theme" (タークスのテーマ Tākusu no Tēma)	2:19
14.	"Under the Rotting Pizza" (腐ったピザの下で Kusatta Piza no Shita de)	3:22
15.	"The Oppressed" (虐げられた民衆 Shiitagerareta Minshū)	2:38
16.	"Honeybee Inn" (蜜蜂の館 Mitsubachi no Yakata)	3:52
17.	"Who...Are You?" (お前は...誰だ Omae wa... Dare da)	1:24
18.	"Don of the Slums" (スラムのドン Suramu no Don)	2:11
19.	"Infiltrating Shinra" (神羅ビル潜入 Shinra Biru Sennyū)	3:49
20.	"Fight On!" (更に闘う者達 Sarani Tatakau Monotachi, lit. "Those Who Fight Further")	3:32
21.	"Red XIII's Theme" (レッドXIIIのテーマ Reddo XIII no Tēma)	1:28
22.	"The Chase" (クレイジーモーターサイクル Kureijī Mōtāsaikuru, lit. "Crazy Motorcycle")	3:37
23.	"Dear to the Heart" (想いを胸に Omoi o Mune ni)	2:14

Disc two
No.	Title	Length
1.	"Main Theme of Final Fantasy VII" (F.F.VIIメインテーマ F. F. VII Mein Tēma)	6:29
2.	"On Our Way" (旅の途中で Tabi no Tochū de)	3:44
3.	"Good Night, Until Tomorrow" (お休み,また明日 Oyasumi, Mata Ashita)	0:10
4.	"On That Day, Five Years Ago" (5年前のあの日 Gonen Mae no Ano Hi)	3:13
5.	"Farm Boy" (牧場の少年 Bokujō no Shōnen)	2:52
6.	"Waltz de Chocobo" (ワルツ・デ・チョコボ Warutsu de Chokobo)	0:34
7.	"Electric de Chocobo" (エレキ・デ・チョコボ Ereki de Chokobo)	4:02
8.	"Cinco de Chocobo" (シンコ・デ・チョコボ Shinko de Chokobo)	3:00
9.	"In Search of the Man in Black" (黒マントの男を追え Kuro Manto no Otoko o Oe)	3:04
10.	"Fort Condor" (鷲の砦 Washi no Toride)	4:00
11.	"Rufus' Welcoming Ceremony" (ルーファウス歓迎式典 Rūfausu Kangei Shikiten)	2:14
12.	"It's Hard to Stand on Both Feet!" (二本足で立つのも難しいものだな Nihon Ashi de Tatsu no mo Muzukashī Mono da na)	3:31
13.	"Trail of Blood" (血の跡 Chi no Ato)	4:13
14.	"J-E-N-O-V-A" (J-E-N-O-V-A)	2:32
15.	"Continue" (つづきから Tsuzuki Kara)	0:37
16.	"Costa del Sol" (太陽の海岸 Taiyō no Kaigan, lit. "Sun Coast")	2:28
17.	"Mark of a Traitor" (裏切り者の烙印 Uragirimono no Rakuin)	3:32
18.	"Mining Town" (炭坑の街 Tankō no Machi)	3:00
19.	"Gold Saucer" (ゴールドソーサー Gōrudo Sōsā)	1:58
20.	"Cait Sith's Theme" (ケット・シーのテーマ Ketto Shī no Tēma)	3:34
21.	"Desert Wasteland" (砂の流刑地 Suna no Ryūkeichi)	5:33

Disc three
No.	Title	Length
1.	"Cosmo Canyon" (星降る峡谷 Hoshi Furu Kyōkoku, lit. "Valley of the Falling Stars")	3:36
2.	"Lifestream" (生命の流れ Seimei no Nagare, lit. "Stream of Life")	3:36
3.	"The Great Warrior" (偉大なる戦士 Idai naru Senshi)	3:24
4.	"Descendant of Shinobi" (忍びの末裔 Shinobi no Matsuei)	2:45
5.	"Those Chosen by the Planet" (星に選ばれし者 Hoshi ni Erabareshi Mono)	3:16
6.	"The Nightmare Begins" (悪夢の始まり Akumu no Hajimari)	2:58
7.	"Cid's Theme" (シドのテーマ Shido no Tēma)	3:11
8.	"Steal the Tiny Bronco!" (タイニーブロンコを奪え! Tainī Buronko o Ubae!)	1:16
9.	"Wutai" (ウータイ Ūtai)	4:29
10.	"Stolen Materia" (マテリアいただき Materia Itadaki)	1:36
11.	"Win / Place / Show Chocobo!" (本命穴チョコボ Honmei Ana Chokobo, lit. "Place Chocobo")	1:50
12.	"Fiddle de Chocobo" (フィドル・デ・チョコボ Fidoru de Chokobo)	2:50
13.	"Jackpot!" (大当たりぃ~ Ōatarī~)	0:47
14.	"Tango of Tears" (涙のタンゴ Namida no Tango)	0:49
15.	"Debut" (初舞台 Hatsubutai)	2:36
16.	"Words Drowned by Fireworks" (花火に消された言葉 Hanabi ni Kesareta Kotoba)	2:50
17.	"Forested Temple" (樹海の神殿 Jukai no Shinden)	3:51
18.	"Listen to the Cries of the Planet" (星の声が聞こえる Hoshi no Koe ga Kikoeru)	3:40
19.	"Aerith's Theme" (エアリスのテーマ Earisu no Tēma)	4:18
20.	"Buried in Snow" (雪に閉ざされて Yuki ni Tozasarete)	4:51
21.	"The North Cave" (北の大空洞 Kita no Daikūdō)	6:05
22.	"Reunion" (リユニオン Riyunion)	3:34
23.	"Who... Am I?" (俺は...誰だ Ore wa... Dare da)	1:37

Disc four
No.	Title	Length
1.	"Shinra's Full-Scale Assault" (神羅軍総攻撃 Shinra Gun Sōkōgeki)	2:57
2.	"Attack of the Weapon" (ウェポン襲来 Wepon Shūrai)	2:52
3.	"The Highwind Takes to the Skies" (空駆けるハイウィンド Sora Kakeru Haiwindo)	3:35
4.	"Secret of the Deep Sea" (深海に眠る秘密 Shinkai ni Nemuru Himitsu)	4:17
5.	"Provincial Town" (偏狭の村 Henkyō no Mura)	2:26
6.	"From the Edge of Despair" (絶望の淵から Zetsubō no Fuchi Kara)	4:15
7.	"Other Side of the Mountain" (山の向こうに Yama no Mukō ni)	2:35
8.	"Hurry Up!" (もっと急げ! Motto Isoge!)	2:57
9.	"Launching a Dream into Space" (宇宙への夢 Uchū e no Yume)	2:50
10.	"Countdown" (秒読み開始 Byōyomi Kaishi)	0:50
11.	"Open Your Heart" (心開けば Kokoro Akeba)	2:47
12.	"Mako Cannon - The Destruction of Shinra" (魔晄キャノン発射～神羅爆発 Makō Kyanon Hassha ~ Shinra Bakuhatsu)	1:33
13.	"Judgment Day" (最期の日 Saigo no Hi)	4:07
14.	"Jenova Complete" (完全なるジェノヴァ Kanzen naru Jenova)	3:59
15.	"Birth of a God" (神の誕生 Kami no Tanjō)	4:11
16.	"One-Winged Angel" (片翼の天使 Katayoku no Tenshi)	7:19
17.	"The Planet's Crisis" (星の危機 Hoshi no Kiki)	8:05
18.	"Ending Credits" (スタッフロール Sutaffu Rōru, lit. "Staff Roll")	6:51

=== Reunion Tracks ===
Final Fantasy VII Reunion Tracks is a single-disc album that comprises a selection of tracks from Final Fantasy VII Original Soundtrack. It was initially released through DigiCube on October 22, 1997 and later reissued by Square Enix on February 23, 2005. While the record was never published outside Japan, the music is available in the North American iTunes Store. All of the pieces are the same as on the Original Soundtrack except for "Main Theme of Final Fantasy VII", "One-Winged Angel", and "Aerith's Theme", which were re-recorded with an orchestra and choir. Some versions of the album also contain a hidden pregap track, which can be accessed by rewinding from the start of the album. This track is an instrumental version of "One-Winged Angel" without the choir. The new arrangements were created by Shirō Hamaguchi. The album spans 1:12:24 over 19 tracks.

Final Fantasy VII Reunion Tracks reached No. 20 on the Japan Oricon charts, and sold over 25,600 copies. It received mixed reviews. Gann liked the newly orchestrated tracks, calling them "incredibly well-done orchestrations", and said that "depending on how willing you are to spend money" they made the album worth purchasing on their own, although he felt the other tracks offered nothing new to owners of the original soundtrack. Chris of Square Enix Music Online, however, felt that while the orchestrated tracks were well-done, the selection of the other tracks was poor and that the album as a whole was "a lousy purchase for most who enjoyed Final Fantasy VII's score".

Track listing
No.	Title	Length
1.	"Opening - Bombing Mission" (オープニング~爆破ミッション Ōpuningu ~ Bakuha Misshon)	3:59
2.	"Cosmo Canyon" (星降る峡谷 Hoshi Furu Kyōkoku)	3:36
3.	"Fight On!" (更に闘う者達 Sarani Tatakau Monotachi, lit. "Those Who Fight Further")	3:34
4.	"Farm Boy" (牧場の少年 Bokujō no Shōnen)	2:52
5.	"Rufus's Welcoming Ceremony" (ルーファウス歓迎式典 Rūfausu Kangei Shikiten)	2:15
6.	"Electric de Chocobo" (エレキ・デ・チョコボ Ereki de Chokobo)	4:03
7.	"Honeybee Inn" (蜜蜂の館 Mitsubachi no yakata)	3:53
8.	"Cid's Theme" (シドのテーマ Shido no Tēma)	3:12
9.	"Forested Temple" (樹海の神殿 Jukai no Shinden)	3:52
10.	"Let the Battles Begin!" (闘う者達 Tatakau Monotachi, lit. "Those Who Fight")	2:48
11.	"On Our Way" (旅の途中で Tabi no Tochū De)	3:45
12.	"Gold Saucer" (ゴールドソーサー Gōrudo Sōsā)	1:59
13.	"Crazy Motorcycle" (クレイジーモーターサイクル Kureijī Mōtāsaikuru)	3:38
14.	"Cait Sith's Theme" (ケット・シーのテーマ Ketto Shī no Tēma)	3:35
15.	"Descendant of Shinobi" (忍びの末裔 Shinobi no Matsuei)	2:46
16.	"Jenova" (J-E-N-O-V-A)	2:35
17.	"Main Theme of Final Fantasy VII" (F.F.VIIメインテーマ F. F. VII Mein Tēma)	6:29
18.	"One-Winged Angel" (片翼の天使 Katayoku no Tenshi)	4:27
19.	"Aerith's Theme" (エアリスのテーマ Earisu no Tēma)	5:01

=== Piano Collections ===
Piano Collections Final Fantasy VII is an album featuring piano arrangements of selected Final Fantasy VII pieces composed by Nobuo Uematsu, arranged by Shirō Hamaguchi, and performed by Seiji Honda. The album was released through DigiCube on December 3, 2003 and later reissued by Square Enix on May 10, 2004. It covers a duration of 47:37 over 13 tracks. The album includes light-hearted tracks as well as slower, more emotional pieces, covering a variety of genres such as marches, new-age themes, and jazz. Unlike previous and subsequent Final Fantasy piano albums, Piano Collections Final Fantasy VII was produced many years after the release of the original game. As three of the tracks from this album were reused in the soundtrack to Final Fantasy VII: Advent Children, it has been speculated that the album was produced with the intention to provide tunes for Advent Children.

Piano Collections Final Fantasy VII reached No. 228 on the Japan Oricon charts, selling 1,200 copies, and was well received by reviewers, with Gann raving that the pieces were fun to listen to, the performer was "amazing", the choice of tracks was "excellent", and the album as a whole was a "spectacular CD". Sophia of Soundtrack Central concurred and stated that the album was "quite fulfilling to listen to" and that it surpassed her expectations.

Track listing
No.	Title	Length
1.	"Tifa's Theme" (ティファのテーマ Tifa no Tēma)	4:22
2.	"Main Theme of Final Fantasy VII" (F.F.VIIメインテーマ F. F. VII Mein Tēma)	4:27
3.	"Cinco de Chocobo" (シンコ・デ・チョコボ Shinko de Chokobo)	2:19
4.	"On Our Way" (旅の途中で Tabi no Tochū De)	4:05
5.	"Let the Battles Begin!" (闘う者達 Tatakau Monotachi, lit. "Those Who Fight")	3:57
6.	"Cosmo Canyon" (星降る峡谷 Hoshi Furu Kyōkoku)	4:38
7.	"Gold Saucer" (ゴールドソーサー Gōrudo Sōsā)	2:28
8.	"Farm Boy" (牧場の少年 Bokujō no Shōnen)	3:33
9.	"Rufus's Welcoming Ceremony" (ルーファウス歓迎式典 Rūfausu Kangei Shikiten)	3:03
10.	"Jenova" (J-E-N-O-V-A)	2:23
11.	"Aerith's Theme" (エアリスのテーマ Earisu no Tēma)	4:06
12.	"One-Winged Angel" (片翼の天使 Katayoku no Tenshi)	4:49
13.	"Descendant of Shinobi" (忍びの末裔 Shinobi no Matsuei)	3:20

=== Final Fantasy VII Remake ===
In 2020, Square Enix released Final Fantasy VII Remake, the first section of a multi-episode remake of Final Fantasy VII. A seven-disc, 156-track, 8:34:28 soundtrack album, Final Fantasy VII Remake Original Soundtrack, was released on May 27, with a special edition adding an eighth 1:07:16 disc with an additional 24 tracks from the jukebox feature in the game. The soundtrack contains arrangements of Uematsu's music from the original game, along with new compositions by Masashi Hamauzu and others.

Additionally, the theme song "Hollow", composed by Uematsu and performed by Yosh was released as a single on May 27, 2020.

=== Final Fantasy VII Rebirth ===
The second installment of the Remake trilogy, Final Fantasy VII Rebirth was released in February 2024. The seven-disc, 175-track, 9:09:25 soundtrack album, Final Fantasy VII Rebirth Original Soundtrack, was released on April 10. The special edition includes a 34-track bonus disc containing music from Rebirth's mini-games. As with Remake, the soundtrack contains arrangements of Uematsu's music from the original game along with new compositions and arrangements.

Additionally, the theme song "No Promises to Keep", composed by Uematsu and performed by Loren Allred was released as a single on April 3. Kazushige Nojima, who wrote the scenario for the game, also wrote the lyrics to the song. He was careful not to make the lyrics too specific to Cloud or Zack and did not think of it as a love song, but rather about Aerith's defiance against her fate.

== Compilation albums ==
=== Advent Children ===
Final Fantasy VII Advent Children Original Soundtrack

Soundtrack album by Nobuo Uematsu
- Released: September 28, 2005
- Length: 39:13 (disc one); 43:37 (disc two)
- Label: Square Enix
- Producer: Nobuo Uematsu

Final Fantasy VII: Advent Children is the 2005 CGI film sequel to the original game, and the beginning of the Compilation of Final Fantasy VII. Its soundtrack album, Final Fantasy VII Advent Children Original Soundtrack, was released on September 28, 2005, containing new material created specifically for the film, as well as arrangements of tunes from the Final Fantasy VII soundtrack. Both the original tracks and the arrangements cover a variety of musical styles, including orchestral, choral, classical piano, and rock music; Variety noted that the styles vary between "sparse piano noodlings, pop metal thrashings and cloying power ballads". The tracks were composed by Nobuo Uematsu, Keiji Kawamori, Kenichiro Fukui, and Tsuyoshi Sekito, and arranged by Fukui, Sekito, Kawamori, Shirō Hamaguchi, Kazuhiko Toyama and The Black Mages. Upon hearing each track, Nomura would make some changes, and have the composers re-record the piece. The song "Calling" from 1989 by former Boøwy vocalist Kyosuke Himuro was used in the film's credits. Some of the piano tracks are longer than what was included in the film. The album spans 26 tracks on two discs, covering a duration of 1:21:41. In addition to the regular release, a limited edition was produced with a foil slipcover and a booklet of credits and lyrics. The soundtrack album reached position #15 on the Japanese Oricon music charts, and stayed on the charts for 10 weeks.

A mini-album titled Final Fantasy VII Advent Children Complete Mini Album was released on April 10, 2009 to coincide with the release of the Final Fantasy VII Advent Children Complete version of the film. The new release of the film included a new ending theme, "Safe and Sound", by Kyosuke Himuro and My Chemical Romance singer Gerard Way, and replaced "Water" with a new song, "Anxious Heart". The mini-album was five tracks and 29:17 long. The other included tracks on the album were new versions of "The Chase of Highway", "Those Who Fight Further", "Sign", "Advent: One-Winged Angel", and "On the Way to a Smile", a piece from the Final Fantasy VII-based original video animation On the Way to a Smile. A larger album, Final Fantasy VII Advent Children Complete: Reunion Tracks, was released with 21 tracks on September 16 the same year. This album contains the tracks from the mini-album, as well as several pieces that were lengthened for the Complete film version but not rearranged. Reunion Tracks appeared on the Oricon charts for a single week at position #108.

Final Fantasy VII Advent Children Original Soundtrack sold over 38,900 copies, and was well received by critics. Gann said that Final Fantasy fans have "no excuse" not to buy the album and noted that his only disappointments were that three of the tracks were the same as on the Piano Collections album, and that as a film score, some of the shifts in the pieces make less sense outside of the context of the visuals. Chris Carle of IGN called it a "jagged but beautiful blend of opera, metal and electronica", and a "richly-layered, complex and utterly listenable soundtrack" while praising the variety of musical styles used and the quality of the pieces. In contrast to Gann, he felt that "divorced from the film, the score is still amazingly listenable".

Track listing

Disc one
No.	Title	Length
1.	"Opening"	1:30
2.	"The Promised Land" (約束の地～The Promised Land～ Yakusoku no Chi ~The Promised Land~)	2:52
3.	"Beyond the Wasteland"	4:14
4.	"Sign"	1:49
5.	"Tifa's Theme (Piano Version)" (ティファのテーマ (Piano Version) Tifa no Tēma (Piano Version))	4:24
6.	"For the Reunion"	2:32
7.	"Let the Battles Begin! (Piano Version)" (闘う者達 (Piano Version) Tatakau Monotachi (Piano Version))	4:00
8.	"Water"	2:21
9.	"Materia"	0:53
10.	"Black Water"	2:40
11.	"Aerith's Theme (Piano Version)" (エアリスのテーマ (Piano Version) Earisu no Tēma (Piano Version))	4:07
12.	"Battle in the Forgotten City"	3:25
13.	"Violator"	2:35
14.	"The North Cave (FFVII AC Version)" (北の大空洞 (FFVII AC Version) Kita no Daikūdō (FFVII AC Version))	1:51

Disc two
No.	Title	Length
1.	"Divinity I" (天来～Divinity I～ Tenrai ~Divinity I~)	2:54
2.	"Let the Battles Begin! (FFVII AC Version)" (闘う者達 (FFVII AC Version) Tatakau Monotachi (FFVII AC Version))	1:59
3.	"Fight On! (FFVII AC Version)" (更に闘う者達 (FFVII AC Version) Sarani Tatakau Monotachi (FFVII AC Version))	4:25
4.	"Divinity II" (天来～Divinity II～ Tenrai ~Divinity II~)	3:35
5.	"Encounter"	0:53
6.	"The Chase of Highway"	4:34
7.	"Savior"	2:16
8.	"Jenova (FFVII AC Version)" (J-E-N-O-V-A (FFVII AC version))	2:46
9.	"Advent: One-Winged Angel" (再臨：片翼の天使～Advent: One-Winged Angel～ Sairin: Katayoku no Tenshi ~Advent: One-Winged Angel~)	6:07
10.	"Cloud Smiles"	3:29
11.	"End Credits"	5:36
12.	"Calling"	5:03

=== Dirge of Cerberus ===
Dirge of Cerberus: Final Fantasy VII was released for the PlayStation 2 in January 2006, and its soundtrack, Dirge of Cerberus: Final Fantasy VII Original Soundtrack, was released a month later. The tracks were composed by Masashi Hamauzu and orchestrations were provided by Yoshihisa Hirano, making it the first Final Fantasy VII-related soundtrack to not include new material from Nobuo Uematsu. Koji Haishima conducted the Tokyo Philharmonic Orchestra, which performed the music for around half of the album. The soundtrack also contains the game's theme song "Redemption" and insert song "Longing", both of which were recorded by Japanese musician and actor Gackt, and additionally released separately through the artist's ex label, Nippon Crown, as a single. The album contains a mix of orchestral and rock tracks, with some orchestral performances of slow compositions and marches and both styles of music used for faster-paced "threatening" and "dynamic" tunes. GameSpot describes the music as ranging from "quiet, almost nonexistent ambient tunes to dramatic, orchestrated tracks". The album was launched on February 15, 2006, and spans 53 tracks over two discs, covering a duration of 2:14:22. The limited edition of the soundtrack includes a case which is designed to hold the soundtrack, along with the game disc and the limited edition of the "Redemption" single and associated DVD, although these other albums still must be purchased separately.

Dirge of Cerberus: Final Fantasy VII Original Soundtrack received mixed reviews from critics. Gann called it "solid, [...], but not awe-inspiring" and dismissed the limited edition extras as not worth the purchase. Eduardo of Square Enix Music Online, however, described it as "nearly perfect" and said that he "can, and will, run out of positive adjectives to describe the Dirge of Cerberus Final Fantasy VII Original Soundtrack. It's a work of genius". The album reached position #19 on the Oricon charts, and sold over 14,300 copies; the "Redemption" single sold over 125,000 copies.

Track listing

Disc one
No.	Title	Length
1.	"Flicker"	1:28
2.	"Calm Before the Storm"	2:20
3.	"Trigger Situation"	2:04
4.	"Prologue of "Dirge of Cerberus""	2:46
5.	"Fragment of Memory"	4:00
6.	"Fearful Happening"	3:53
7.	"WRO March"	2:22
8.	"Azul the Cerulean"	2:15
9.	"Fight Tune "Arms of Shinra""	3:12
10.	"Abhorrence Whirls"	3:43
11.	"Silent Edge"	3:05
12.	"Undulation"	1:04
13.	"Counteroffensive"	2:20
14.	"Ten Year Reunion"	3:31
15.	"Fight Tune "Girl Named Shelke""	2:54
16.	"Fight Tune "Killing One Another""	2:11
17.	"Uneasy Feelings"	2:51
18.	"Memories with Lucrecia"	1:11
19.	"Sneaky Cait Sith"	3:56
20.	"Darkness"	2:19
21.	"Lifestream"	4:08
22.	"Rosso the Crimson"	1:23
23.	"Mysterious Ninja"	1:11
24.	"Ninja Girl of Wutai"	1:24
25.	"Sudden Parting"	1:10
26.	"Discovery in Sadness"	1:25
27.	"A Proposal"	2:17
28.	"High-Spirited"	0:40
29.	"Return to the Subject"	2:54
30.	"Marching Tune #0"	0:55

Disc two
No.	Title	Length
1.	"Return to the Origin"	2:05
2.	"Marching Tune"	3:50
3.	"Fight Tune "Crimson Impact""	1:52
4.	"Under a Full Moon"	1:23
5.	"Trespasser"	4:03
6.	"Transformation into Chaos"	1:17
7.	"Splinter of Sadness"	2:02
8.	"Deep Darkness of Shinra"	3:55
9.	"Lucrecia Crescent"	3:33
10.	"Forgotten Tears"	1:35
11.	"Fight Tune "Messenger of the Dark""	2:40
12.	"Awakening"	1:44
13.	"Fight Tune "The Immaculate""	5:03
14.	"Finally Reborn"	1:36
15.	"The Last SND"	1:37
16.	"Everyone's Help"	1:43
17.	"Longing"	4:00
18.	"Terminus"	3:01
19.	"Quickening"	3:00
20.	"Death and Rebirth"	1:07
21.	"Chaotic End"	4:28
22.	"Redemption"	4:04
23.	"Hope of the Future"	3:52

==== Dirge of Cerberus Multiplayer Mode ====
The Japanese version of Dirge of Cerberus included a multiplayer mode absent from other releases, which contained music tracks not used in the single-player game. Dirge of Cerberus: Final Fantasy VII Multiplayer Mode Original Sound Collections is a download-only soundtrack album for the multiplayer tracks released through the Japanese iTunes Store and the Square Enix Music Download website on August 22, 2006. It spans 1:07:07 over 27 tracks. The soundtrack includes all the music from the multiplayer mode and some music from the single-player game which did not appear on the previous soundtrack album, including two tracks composed by Ryo Yamazaki for the North American release of the game.

Eduardo of Square Enix Music Online also appreciated Dirge of Cerberus: Final Fantasy VII Multiplayer Mode Original Sound Collections, saying that it accented the Original Soundtrack well and that "Hamauzu and Yamazaki have delivered strongly and, with a decent mix of electronica, orchestral music, and rock, the entirety of the Dirge of Cerberus musical experience cannot be missed".

Track listing
No.	Title	Length
1.	"Turks 101"	4:13
2.	"Song of the Gathered"	2:18
3.	"Final Briefing"	2:05
4.	"Underground Complex"	2:44
5.	"Fierce Battle"	2:49
6.	"Time Limit"	2:12
7.	"Bad Feeling"	1:04
8.	"Wild Pack"	2:33
9.	"Immaculate Frenzy"	1:07
10.	"Pegasus Riders"	2:25
11.	"Meeting in the Rain"	1:21
12.	"Heavy Armored Soldier"	2:34
13.	"Lucrecia's Research"	0:52
14.	"Flying High"	1:16
15.	"Pure Stream"	0:54
16.	"Train Graveyard"	2:35
17.	"Central Complex"	2:32
18.	"Uncontrollable Darkness"	2:25
19.	"True Beast"	2:55
20.	"Crumbling Mind"	3:24
21.	"Attack on Midgar"	2:51
22.	"Redeem the World"	1:05
23.	"Outskirts of Fight"	2:57
24.	"Combat Results"	1:59
25.	"Restrictor"	3:40
26.	"First Encounters"	5:52
27.	"Dark Feelings"	4:25

=== Crisis Core ===
Crisis Core: Final Fantasy VII Original Soundtrack is the soundtrack of the game Crisis Core: Final Fantasy VII. It was released on October 10, 2007 by Warner Music Japan and covers 55 tracks over two discs with a total duration of 2:20:59. The music was primarily composed by Takeharu Ishimoto, with a few tracks provided by Kazuhiko Toyama. It was Ishimoto's second major work, after the soundtrack to The World Ends with You; the only titles he had composed for previously were World Fantasista, a niche soccer video game for which he was a co-composer, and the cell phone game Before Crisis: Final Fantasy VII. The tracks composed by Ishimoto cover a range of moods, from "harsh and in-your-face" to "stunning and lovely", but were primarily used as ambient background music. The soundtrack also includes a large number of arrangements of tunes from the original Final Fantasy VII score, as well as a theme song entitled "Why", performed by Ayaka. A variety of musical instruments were used for the soundtrack, including piano and synthesizers, but critics noted that Ishimoto used guitars, both electronic and acoustic, more and better than any previous Final Fantasy soundtrack.

Crisis Core: Final Fantasy VII Original Soundtrack sold over 13,300 copies, while "Why" sold 60,000 copies. It received mixed reviews by critics, with Don of Square Enix Music Online stating that while some of Ishimoto's and all of Toyama's arrangements were excellent, the original pieces that made up the bulk of the album offered "very little that is actually worth a listen". Gann was more lenient, praising Ishimoto for writing "an excellent soundtrack" and being especially happy with the quality of the arrangements of Uematsu's pieces. Gann did, however, note that because Ishimoto's original works were more ambient, his arrangements, and by extension Uematsu's work, far outshone his own new contributions. He also felt that the theme song "Why" was "generic" and "bland". Sophia Tong of IGN described the album as a "mixed bag", stating that some of the arrangements and new tracks were "fantastic" while others were "not all that compelling", and lamented the overuse of a few themes throughout the soundtrack.

Track listing

Disc one
No.	Title	Length
1.	"Memory Fragments - DMW" (記憶の欠片 -D.M.W- Kioku no Kakera -D.M.W-)	1:16
2.	"Crisis Core Theme - Succession" (Theme of CRISIS CORE｢継承｣ Theme of Crisis Core "Keishō")	0:41
3.	"Begin Mission" (ミッションスタート Misshon Sutāto)	3:25
4.	"First Mission (from FFVII 'Opening - Bombing Mission')" (ファーストミッション(FFVII｢オープニング爆破ミッション｣より) Fāsuto Misshon (FFVII "Ōpuning ~ Bakuha Misshon" yori))	2:50
5.	"Mako City" (魔晄都市 Makōtoshi)	1:53
6.	"Vigilant Night" (憂国の月夜 Yūkoku no Tsukiyo)	1:30
7.	"Encounter" (エンカウント Enkaunto)	3:22
8.	"Crisis Core Theme - Dreams and Honor" (Theme of CRISIS CORE｢夢と誇り｣ Theme of Crisis Core "Yume to Hokori")	3:17
9.	"Last Order-Crisis Mix (From Last Order FFVII)" (Last Order-Crisis Mix(｢LAST ORDER FFVII｣より) Last Order-Crisis Mix "Last Order FFVII" yori))	3:23
10.	"The Terrible Truth" (真実の重み Shinjitsu no Omomi)	2:06
11.	"Roaming in the Afternoon Sun" (陽射す午後の彷徨 Hizasu Gogo no Hōkō)	3:20
12.	"Conflict" (コンフリクト Konfurikuto)	2:18
13.	"The Iron Beast" (操られし鉄の獣 Ayatsurareshi Tetsu no Kedamono)	2:57
14.	"Crisis Core Theme - Under the Apple Tree" (Theme of CRISIS CORE｢リンゴの木の下で｣ Theme of Crisis Core "Ringo no Ki no Shita de")	4:00
15.	"The Summoned (From FFVII 'Fight on!')" (召喚されし者(FFVII｢更に闘う者達｣より) Shōkansareshi Mono (FFVII "Sarani Tatakau Monotachi" yori))	3:08
16.	"Burden to Bear" (背負うもの Seou Mono)	1:32
17.	"Timely Ambush (From FFVII 'Let the Battles Begin!')" (間際の急襲(FFVII｢闘う者達｣より) Magiwa no Kyūshū (FFVII "Tatakau Monotachi" yori))	3:04
18.	"Dark Suits (From FFVII 'Turks' Theme')" (暗躍のダークスーツ(FFVII｢タークスのテーマ｣より) An'yaku no Dākusūtu (FFVII "Tākusu no Tēma" yori))	2:23
19.	"Pipes and Steel (From Last Order FFVII)" (鉄と管の楼閣(｢LAST ORDER FFVII｣より) Tetsu to Kan no Rōkaku ("Last Order FFVII" yori))	1:22
20.	"Combat" (コンバット Konbatto)	2:56
21.	"Crisis Core Theme - The Scars That Remain" (Theme of CRISIS CORE｢友情の傷痕｣ Theme of Crisis Core "Yūjō to Kizuato")	1:26
22.	"A Flower Blooming In the Slums (From FFVII 'Aerith's Theme')" (スラムに咲く花(FFVII｢エアリスのテーマ｣より) Suramu ni Saku Hana (FFVII "Earisu no Tēma" yori))	2:14
23.	"Eyes the Color of the Sky" (空色の瞳 Sorairo no Hitomi)	1:44
24.	"Crisis Core Theme - Protect Your Honor" (Theme of CRISIS CORE｢誇りと共に｣ Theme of Crisis Core "Hokori to Tomo ni")	2:12
25.	"Anguish" (苦悩の旋律 Kunō no Senritsu)	0:59
26.	"March Through Harsh Terrain (From Last Order FFVII)" (辺境の行軍(｢LAST ORDER FFVII｣より) Henkyō no Kōgun ("Last Order FFVII" yori))	2:05
27.	"A Moment of Camaraderie" (交歓のひととき Kōkan no Hitotoki)	1:07
28.	"Black Wing Unfurled" (羽ばたく黒い翼 Habataku Kuroi Tusbasa)	3:02
29.	"Crisis Core Theme - True Motives" (Theme of CRISIS CORE｢計画の真実｣ Theme of Crisis Core "Keikaku no Shinjitsu")	2:05
30.	"No Honor Remains" (誇りを失った姿 Hokori o Ushinatta Sugata)	2:46
31.	"Why (CCFFVII Mix)"	2:15

Disc two
No.	Title	Length
1.	"Where Light Does Not Reach" (陽の光を閉ざされた街 Hi no Hikari o Tozasareta Machi)	3:15
2.	"New Developments" (動き出す事態 Ugokidasu Jitai)	1:21
3.	"Mako Monopoly (From FFVII 'Shinra Company')" (魔晄を支配する組織(FFVII｢新羅カンパニー｣より) Makō o Shihai suru Soshiki (FFVII "Shinra Kanpanī" yori))	4:16
4.	"Crisis Core Theme - New Assignment" (Theme of CRISIS CORE｢新たな任地へ｣ Theme of Crisis Core "Arata na Ninchi e")	1:23
5.	"The Shrouded Village (From FFVII 'Heart of Anxiety')" (閉ざされた村(FFVII｢不安な心｣より) Tozasareta Mura (FFVII "Fuan na Kokoro" yori))	2:42
6.	"Parting of Ways" (決別の旋律 Ketsubetsu no Senritsu)	1:44
7.	"The Ominous Mansion" (陰鬱な屋敷 In'utsu na Yashiki)	1:37
8.	"A Brief Rest" (しばしの休息 Shibashi no Kyūsoku)	0:12
9.	"Prelude to Destruction" (崩壊の序曲 Hōkai no Jokyoku)	1:12
10.	"Vengeance on the World (From FFVII 'One-Winged Angel')" (世に仇なす者(FFVII｢片翼の天使｣より) Yo ni Ada nasu Mono (FFVII "Katayoku no Tenshi" yori))	3:23
11.	"Night of Seclusion" (隠遁の夜 Inton no Yoru)	3:44
12.	"Duty and Friendship" (任務と友情 Ninmu to Yūjō)	1:22
13.	"Crisis Core Theme - Blazing Through the Battlefield" (Theme of CRISIS CORE｢疾走の戦域｣ Theme of Crisis Core "Shissō no Sen'iki)	1:04
14.	"Escape into the Wasteland" (逃走の荒野 Tōsō no Kōya)	2:53
15.	"Resolution" (覚悟の旋律 Kakugo no Senritsu)	1:41
16.	"Wandering under the Moonlight" (月明の彷徨 Getsumei no Hōkō)	1:54
17.	"The Water's Surface" (古の詩に詠まれし水辺 Inishie no Shi ni Yomareshi Suihen)	2:56
18.	"Howling Abominations" (集いし異形の咆哮 Tsudoishi Igyō no Hōkō)	3:21
19.	"The Planet Has Become My Guardian" (星の加護を受けし者 Hoshi no Kago o Ukeshi Mono)	4:09
20.	"The SOLDIER Way" (ソルジャーの闘い Sorujā no Tatakai)	2:58
21.	"The Price of Freedom" (自由の代償 Jiyū no Daishō)	3:38
22.	"Why"	4:25
23.	"Living Legacy" (受け継がれる想い Uketsugareru Omoi)	8:42
24.	"To Be Continued (From FFVII 'Opening - Bombing Mission')" (to be continued(FFVII｢オープニング～爆破ミッション｣より) to be continued (FFVII "Ōpuningu ~ Bakuha Misshon" yori))	1:28

=== Before Crisis and Last Order ===
Before Crisis: Final Fantasy VII & Last Order: Final Fantasy VII Original Soundtrack is the combined soundtrack album of the game Before Crisis: Final Fantasy VII and the original video animation Last Order: Final Fantasy VII. Before Crisis serves as a prequel to Final Fantasy VII while Last Order is a side story to Final Fantasy VII, showing some of the same story elements from Crisis Core and Final Fantasy VII from an alternate viewpoint. The album spans 27 tracks, of which the first 12 are from the game and the remainder are from the animation. The album was released on December 19, 2007 by Square Enix, and was mainly composed by Ishimoto, with some tunes based on works from Final Fantasy VII by Uematsu. Many of the pieces composed for the two works were used either directly or in an arranged form in Crisis Core. As this soundtrack album was released after the soundtrack to Crisis Core, these pieces were generally not included in the Before Crisis album. The album covers a duration of 63:48.

Before Crisis: Final Fantasy VII & Last Order: Final Fantasy VII Original Soundtrack was poorly received by critics. Gann said that "the whole album is a flop compared to the quality composition of Crisis Core" and that the contents of the album were "the leftovers, B-Sides, and less-impressive tracks from Ishimoto's arsenal of FFVII music", especially as many tracks were used in the Crisis Core soundtrack and not repeated in this album. Chris (also known as "Dark Cloud") of Square Enix Music Online agreed and recommended it only for listeners who like "loud music without much creativity".

Track listing
No.	Title	Length
1.	"Theme of Turks (BC-FFVII-Version)"	3:07
2.	"Mission"	2:09
3.	"Survive"	2:02
4.	"Secret Action"	3:10
5.	"Theme of Elfe"	3:09
6.	"Black Beat"	2:38
7.	"Desperate Crisis"	3:12
8.	"Last Labyrinth"	2:11
9.	"Rebirth"	1:40
10.	"Theme of Elfe (Angel)"	3:46
11.	"Theme of Elfe (Devil)"	3:54
12.	"Rebirth (Edit)"	5:13
13.	"1st Climax"	2:45
14.	"Cremation"	1:50
15.	"Pride of Soldier"	1:15
16.	"Pursuit"	1:09
17.	"Beyond the Death (From Theme of Tifa)"	1:13
18.	"Frenzy of Steel"	1:10
19.	"Sneak Attack"	0:50
20.	"Decision"	1:22
21.	"Serious Attack"	2:26
22.	"Brief Reunion (From Theme of Tifa)"	0:53
23.	"The Truth in the Dark"	1:40
24.	"Theme of Turks 2005"	1:19
25.	"Dear Friend"	1:55
26.	"Last Order"	3:32
27.	"Last Order (Edit)"	4:18

== Legacy ==
The Black Mages, a now defunct band led by Nobuo Uematsu that arranged music from the Final Fantasy series into a rock music style, has arranged four pieces from Final Fantasy VII. These are "J-E-N-O-V-A" and "Those Who Fight Further" from The Black Mages, published in 2003, "Advent One-Winged Angel" from Final Fantasy VII Advent Children Original Soundtrack and "Opening ~ Bombing Mission" from Darkness and Starlight, published in 2008. Music from Final Fantasy VII has also been used in other games, such as the fighting game Ehrgeiz, Kingdom Hearts series, and the Super Smash Bros. series.

Uematsu continues to perform certain pieces in the Dear Friends -Music from Final Fantasy- concert series. The music of Final Fantasy VII has also appeared in various official concerts and live albums, such as 20020220 Music from Final Fantasy, a live recording of an orchestra performing music from the series including "Aerith's Theme" and "One-Winged Angel". Additionally, several pieces from the game were performed by the New Japan Philharmonic Orchestra in the Tour de Japon: Music from Final Fantasy concert series, and in the Video Games Live international concert series. The Advent Children version of "One-Winged Angel" was performed at the Press Start -Symphony of Games- 2007 concerts in Yokohama and Osaka, Japan, while The Black Mages performed "Those Who Fight Further" at the Extra: Hyper Game Music Event 2007 concert in Tokyo on July 7, 2007. A 40-minute symphony in three movements consisting of music from Final Fantasy VII premiered in 2013 as part of the Final Symphony concert series and was recorded a year later by the London Symphony Orchestra at Abbey Road Studios. Independent but officially licensed releases of Final Fantasy VII music have been composed by such groups as Project Majestic Mix, which focuses on arranging video game music. Selections also appear on Japanese remix albums, called dōjin music, and on English remixing websites, such as OverClocked ReMix. On September 14, 2007, the OverClocked ReMix community released an unofficial tribute album titled Voices of the Lifestream, a compilation containing 45 arrangements of Final Fantasy VII music.

"Aerith's Theme" was voted into Classic FM's 2012 Hall of Fame in 16th place out of 300 compositions. Elizabeth Davis of Classic FM (UK) notes that "Aerith's Theme" is "one of the most famous pieces of video game music ever written" and is rooted in romantic music, and that Final Fantasy VII helped introduce "a whole generation to the magic of orchestral music". Both Remake and Rebirth won the category for best score at The Game Awards 2020 and 2024 respectively.
