= Shirō Hamaguchi =

Japanese anime composer, arranger and orchestrator

Shiro Hamaguchi
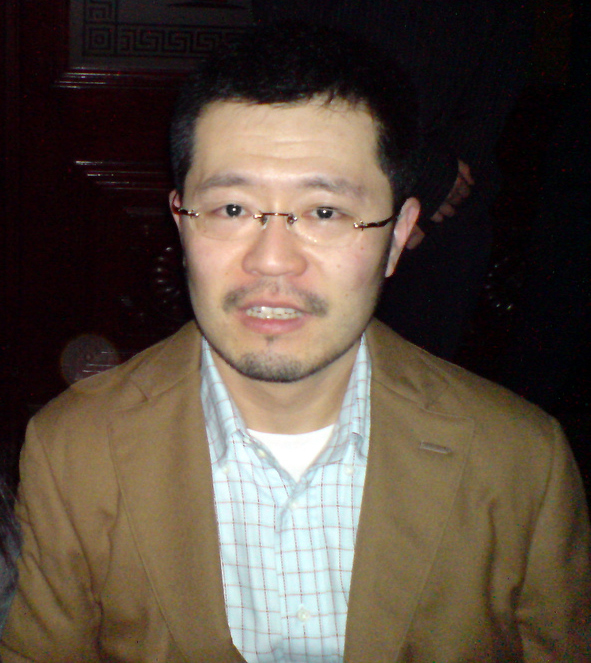
- Shiro Hamaguchi at A Night in Fantasia 2007: Symphonic Games Edition

Background information
- Born: November 19, 1969 (age 56); Fukuoka, Japan
- Genres: classical, contemporary classical, rock, third stream
- Occupations: Composer, arranger, orchestrator
- Instrument: Piano
- Years active: 1994–present

Shirō Hamaguchi (浜口 史郎, Hamaguchi Shirō; born November 19, 1969) is a Japanese composer, arranger and orchestrator. He is best known for composing music to the anime franchises Girls und Panzer, One Piece, and Oh My Goddess! and arranging/orchestrating music in the Final Fantasy series. He frequently collaborates with fellow composers Kohei Tanaka and Akifumi Tada on anime scores.

== Biography ==
=== Early life and career ===
Born in Fukuoka, Japan, Shiro Hamaguchi graduated with a music degree from Tokyo University of the Arts, where he befriended fellow video game musician Masashi Hamauzu. After graduation, he was hired as a department project manager at Victor Entertainment from 1994 to 1996. In 1996, he joined the anime and video game music production company Imagine, where he worked alongside famed composers Hayato Matsuo, Kohei Tanaka, and Kow Otani. His debut role was the anime series Violinist of Hameln (1996), where he arranged Tanaka's works. His music impressed Final Fantasy composer Nobuo Uematsu, who chose Hamaguchi as the arranger for the Final Fantasy VII Reunion Tracks album. He provided orchestral renditions of "Aeris's Theme", "Main Theme of Final Fantasy VII", and "One-Winged Angel", which have become iconic through their use in various Final Fantasy concerts. Subsequently, he created music for the anime series Ehrgeiz (unrelated to the video game) and AWOL - Absent WithOut Leave.

=== Further career ===
Hamaguchi scored the pirate-based anime One Piece in 1999 with Tanaka, later returning to compose four of its movies. He also worked as an arranger for the Sakura Wars series. The success of his Final Fantasy VII arrangements led Uematsu to hire him to orchestrate four pieces for the 1999 title Final Fantasy VIII, including the opening theme "Liberi Fatali" and the theme song "Eyes on Me". These pieces and nine new arrangements appeared in the orchestral album Fithos Lusec Wecos Vinosec Final Fantasy VIII. The following year, he arranged a selection of tracks from the game's soundtrack for the series' first Piano Collections album in five years. The success of "Eyes on Me" prompted Kenji Ito to use Hamaguchi as the arranger for his theme song in Chocobo Racing.

In 2000, Hamaguchi composed the Megumi no Daigo film and the Dinozaurs anime series, the latter with Imagine colleague Akifumi Tada. He provided orchestrations to Final Fantasy IX's full motion video music, featured in Final Fantasy IX Original Soundtrack PLUS, and an arrangement of the theme song "Melodies of Life"; he also created another Piano Collections album to the game. Hamaguchi collaborated with Uematsu to create music for the animated film Ah! My Goddess: The Movie and the 2001 anime series Final Fantasy: Unlimited, which also featured compositions by Tada.

For Final Fantasy X, he orchestrated the ending theme and the two versions of the theme song "Suteki da ne". He also produced the arrangements for the 2002 concert 20020220 Music from Final Fantasy, the first Final Fantasy concert since 1989. It mixed his older arrangements with new ones such as "Vamo' Alla Flamenco", "Theme of Love", "Tina", "Dear Friends", "Final Fantasy", and an eight-minute medley of music from Final Fantasy I, II, and III. The concert and its CD release set a precedent for many future concerts. Also in 2002, Hamaguchi scored the anime series Kiddy Grade. His contribution to Final Fantasy XI (2003) was arranging the opening theme. He also orchestrated three themes for Unlimited Saga on behalf of his university friend Hamauzu.

At the end of 2003, Hamaguchi produced the Piano Collections Final Fantasy VII. He also made new arrangements of "Opening ~ Bombing Mission", "To Zanarkand", "Ronfaure", "You're Not Alone", and "Opera 'Maria and Draco'" for the concert series Tour de Japon: Music from Final Fantasy in 2004. The concert also featured his arrangement of "Cloud Smiles" from the 2005 film Final Fantasy VII Advent Children; the remaining contributions to the film by Hamaguchi were old orchestral and piano arrangements. A handful of Hamaguchi's orchestral arrangements were added to Tour de Japon's American successor Dear Friends - Music from Final Fantasy, which made its debut in May 2004 in Los Angeles. His arrangements have also been performed at the events More Friends: Music from Final Fantasy, Voices - Music from Final Fantasy, and Play! A Video Game Symphony.

In 2005, Hamaguchi scored the anime series Oh! My Goddess and contributed arrangements to the third Symphonic Game Music Concert. The same year, Hamaguchi decided to enroll at the Berklee College of Music in a one-year jazz composition course to further his opportunities as an anime composer. He has since scored One Piece Movie: The Desert Princess and the Pirates: Adventures in Alabasta, Big Windup!, Ah! My Goddess: Fighting Wings, and Rosario + Vampire. He orchestrated the late composer Ingo Nugel and his brother Henning Nugel's arrangements from The Settlers II (10th Anniversary) for performance at the fifth Symphonic Game Music Concert in August 2007. In September 2010, he arranged a symphonic suite containing the music from Starwing and Lylat Wars for the Symphonic Legends concert in Cologne.

Hamaguchi also composed the official music score for the Sanrio anime Jewelpet and its sequels, Jewelpet Twinkle and Jewelpet Sunshine. He later left the production staff in 2012 to focus on composing music for the film One Piece Film: Z and the anime film Hanasaku Iroha: The Movie – Home Sweet Home.

== Discography ==
=== Anime ===
Composition

- Ehrgeiz (1997)
- Awol: Absent Without Leave (1998)
- One Piece (1999–present) – with Kohei Tanaka
- Dinozaurs (2000) – with Akifumi Tada
- Final Fantasy: Unlimited (2001) – with Akifumi Tada
- Kiddy Grade (2002)
- Oh My Goddess! (2005)
- Ah! My Goddess: Fighting Wings (2006)
- Big Windup! (2007)
- Ah! My Goddess: Flights of Fancy (2007)
- Rosario + Vampire (2008) – with Kohei Tanaka
- Rosario + Vampire Capu2 (2008) – with Kohei Tanaka
- Jewelpet (2009)
- Ōkiku Furikabutte ~Natsu no Taikai-hen~ (2010)
- Jewelpet Twinkle (2010)
- Jewelpet Sunshine (2011)
- Hanasaku Iroha (2011)
- Girls und Panzer (2012)
- Tari Tari (2012)
- Problem Children Are Coming from Another World, Aren't They? (2013)
- Karneval (2013) – with Keiji Inai
- Galilei Donna (2013)
- Shirobako (2014)
- Wish Upon the Pleiades (2015)
- Haruchika (2016)
- The Magnificent Kotobuki (2019)

Arrangement

- Violinist of Hamelin (1996)
- Sakura Wars 2 (1999) – with Akifumi Tada, Masami Kishimura, Shinji Miyazaki, and Takayuki Negishi
- Sakura Wars (2000)
- Sakura Taisen: New York NY.99 (2007) – with Takayuki Kishimoto

=== Film ===
Composition

- Ah! My Goddess: The Movie (2000) – with Nobuo Uematsu
- Megumi no Daigo (2000)
- One Piece the Movie: Deddo Endo no Bōken (2003) – with Kohei Tanaka
- Boku no Son Goku (2003)
- One Piece: Norowa re ta Seiken (2004) – with Kohei Tanaka
- One Piece Movie: The Desert Princess and the Pirates: Adventures in Alabasta (2007) – with Kazuhiko Sawaguchi, Kōhei Tanaka, Minoru Maruo, and Yasunori Iwasaki
- Episode of Chopper Plus: Bloom in the Winter, Miracle Sakura (2008) – with Kohei Tanaka
- Eiga! Tamagotchi Uchū Ichi Happy na Monogatari!? (2008)
- One Piece Film: Strong World (2009)
- One Piece Film: Z (2012)
- Hanasaku Iroha: The Movie – Home Sweet Home (2013)
- Girls und Panzer der Film (2015)
- The Magnificent Kotobuki Complete Edition (2020)
- Girls und Panzer das Finale (2017–present)
- Girls und Panzer: Motto Love Love Sakusen Desu! (2026)

Arrangement

- Final Fantasy VII Advent Children (2005) – with Keiji Kawamori, Kenichiro Fukui, and Tsuyoshi Sekito

=== Video games ===
Arrangement

- Final Fantasy VII (1997)
- Final Fantasy VIII (1999)
- Chocobo Racing (1999) – with Kenji Ito
- Final Fantasy IX (2000) – with Kunihiko Kurosawa
- Final Fantasy X (2001) – with Junya Nakano, Masashi Hamauzu, and Hirosato Noda
- Final Fantasy XI (2002) – with Hidenori Iwasaki and Hirosato Noda
- Unlimited Saga (2002)
- Monster Hunter (2004)
- Monster Hunter Tri (2009)

=== Other works ===
Arrangement

- Final Fantasy VII Reunion Tracks (1997)
- Fithos Lusec Wecos Vinosec Final Fantasy VIII (1999)
- Piano Collections Final Fantasy VIII (2000)
- Final Fantasy IX: Melodies of Life - Emiko Shiratori (2000)
- Piano Collections Final Fantasy IX (2001)
- 20020220 Music from Final Fantasy (2002) – with Masashi Hamauzu
- Piano Collections Final Fantasy VII (2003)
- More Friends: Music from Final Fantasy (2006) – with Arnie Roth, Tsuyoshi Sekito, Michio Okamiya, and Kenichiro Fukui
- Distant Worlds: Music from Final Fantasy (2007) – with Naoshi Mizuta, Sachiko Miyano, and Arnie Roth
- Soul Calibur Suite - The Resonance of Souls and Swords (2009)
- Symphonic Legends - Music from Nintendo (2010) – with Jonne Valtonen, Roger Wanamo, Hayato Matsuo, Masashi Hamauzu and Torsten Rasch
