= The Black Mages =

Japanese instrumental rock band

- Origin: Tokyo, Japan
- Genres: Instrumental rock; hard rock; progressive metal; symphonic rock
- Years active: 2002–2010
- Labels: Square Enix Music; Dog Ear Records
- Past members: Nobuo Uematsu; Kenichiro Fukui; Tsuyoshi Sekito; Keiji Kawamori; Arata Hanyuda; Michio Okamiya

The Black Mages were a Japanese instrumental rock band formed in 2002 by Nobuo Uematsu, Kenichiro Fukui and Tsuyoshi Sekito, who were three video game composers for Square and Square Enix. The band arranged Uematsu's Final Fantasy video game series-based compositions in a hard rock style often similar to progressive metal, achieved with the additional use of synthesizers. A year later the band expanded to six members with the addition of Keiji Kawamori, Michio Okamiya and Arata Hanyuda. In August 2010, Uematsu announced the band had been disbanded, but he would continue to perform rock arrangements of his music as a part of another similar band, known as the Earthbound Papas.

The band released three studio albums. Their first was released eponymously as The Black Mages in 2003, and contained arrangements of Final Fantasy battle themes. The second album, The Black Mages II: The Skies Above, was released in 2004 and featured additional pieces besides battle themes including the group's first original song, "Blue Blast ~Winning the Rainbow", which was created for Japanese K-1 fighter Takehiro Murahama. The third album, The Black Mages III: Darkness and Starlight, was released in 2008. Music from the group has also appeared in other albums, including one track in Dark Chronicle Premium Arrange, an album of arranged music from the video game Dark Chronicle, a piece in the animated film Final Fantasy VII Advent Children and its corresponding soundtrack album, and one track on Final Fantasy III Original Soundtrack, the soundtrack album for the Nintendo DS version of Final Fantasy III.

The Black Mages did not tour as a band, but performed several concerts to promote their album releases. For their first album they performed in Shibuya and Kanagawa, Japan in 2003 and later released a live video of the first concert on DVD exclusively to Uematsu fanclub members. They repeated this for the release of their second album, performing in Kawasaki and Osaka, Japan in 2005 and similarly released on DVD to fanclub members. The third album saw a performance in Yokohama, Japan in 2008; a DVD of the show was released commercially in March 2009. In addition to these concerts, The Black Mages made live appearances at two Final Fantasy concerts, More Friends: Music from Final Fantasy and Voices - Music from Final Fantasy, as well as another video game music event, Extra: Hyper Game Music Event 2007.

== History ==
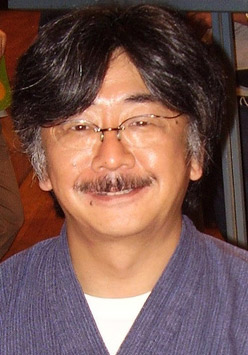
Nobuo Uematsu - composer, producer and keyboardist for The Black Mages

In 2000, Square Enix employees Kenichiro Fukui and Tsuyoshi Sekito formed an experimental partnership to compose music for the video game All Star Pro-Wrestling in a rock style. After the game's success, the two continued to compose in the same style. In 2002, Fukui and Sekito decided to arrange some of the compositions of Nobuo Uematsu, the primary composer for the music of the Final Fantasy series. Uematsu, a fan of rock music, enjoyed these arrangements, and Fukui and Sekito asked him to join them in making a rock band. Declining at first due to feeling too busy with his composing duties and attempts to become a music producer with his Smile Please label, Uematsu agreed to join them in a single live performance as a keyboardist. At the performance, Uematsu felt a "mix of stage fright and excitement, [with] all the crowds cheering, the audience paying full attention", and decided to join the two in making a band; Fukui and Sekito had refused to start one if Uematsu was not involved as one of the musicians.

J-E-N-O-V-A
Short sample of "J-E-N-O-V-A" from The Black Mages — 102 KB

The Skies Above
Short sample of "The Skies Above" from The Black Mages II: The Skies Above — 85 KB

The group has said they were "nervous" about forming a rock band, as they were all "middle-aged", but decided after the performance it would not be a problem. The name "The Black Mages" was chosen by an employee at Square Enix, Mr. Matsushita, and was decided to be in English because it "wouldn't stand out" in Japanese. Square Enix owns the name "The Black Mages", which means while using that name the band was essentially limited to playing Final Fantasy music and original pieces rather than arranging music from other game series that were not owned by the company.

In 2003, Uematsu decided the band should produce an album of Final Fantasy arrangements. The trio arranged, interpreted, and sequenced ten battle themes from various Final Fantasy titles, with Uematsu as producer; the album was released eponymously on February 19, 2003. To celebrate the success, Uematsu decided to organize a concert in tribute to the album; Uematsu and Fukui served as the keyboardists, while Sekito was the guitarist. They needed more people to perform the arrangements live, however, and as such, several other members from Square Enix joined. Keiji Kawamori joined to play the bass guitar, Michio Okamiya to play the guitar, and Arata Hanyuda to play the drums. Since then, The Black Mages have released two additional albums, with all six members participating. The group performed concerts to promote both of these albums, and also participated in video game music-themed concerts.

On August 7, 2010, Uematsu announced the band had formally disbanded. He did not directly state the reason for the decision, though in previous interviews he had noted the band was increasingly finding it difficult to find time to rehearse together. In an April 2011 interview he said the main reason was because The Black Mages had been formed as a "Square Enix" band, they were unable to perform arrangements of work he had composed after leaving Square Enix or to focus on original pieces. Uematsu continues to play rock arrangements of his music as a part of the band the Earthbound Papas, which performed at the Distant Worlds II concert in 2010. He has been joined by fellow Black Mages bandmates Michio Okamiya and Arata Hanyuda, both continuing on guitar and drums, respectively. They had also left Square Enix; Uematsu built the new band to not include any current Square Enix employees so as to avoid the trademark and licensing problems of The Black Mages.

== Discography ==
=== The Black Mages ===
The Black Mages

Studio album by The Black Mages
- Released: February 19, 2003; May 10, 2004 (re-release)
- Genre: Hard rock Progressive metal
- Length: 51:29
- Label: DigiCube; Square Enix (re-release)
- Producer: Nobuo Uematsu

The Black Mages is an arranged soundtrack album of video game music from the Final Fantasy series of role-playing video games. The album contains a selection of musical tracks from the games, arranged and performed in a hybrid of hard rock and progressive metal by The Black Mages. All the selected tracks are "battle themes" from the games. The pieces have been described as "hard-rock" with "blazing synthesizers and guitars". It was first released on February 19, 2003, by DigiCube, and subsequently re-released on May 10, 2004, by Square Enix. It spans ten tracks and covers a duration of 51:29.

The album reached No. 43 on the Japan Oricon charts. It was well received by critics like Andy Byus of RPGFan, who termed it "addicting" and "powerful". He criticized the overuse of synthesizer as opposed to live instruments in some tracks, and that some of the arrangements stayed too close to the original tracks, especially "Dancing Mad". Tetra of Square Enix Music Online also enjoyed the album, saying "all of the members are strong musicians, and Sekito and Fukui were equally strong arrangers". His primary complaint with the album was he felt many of the songs followed the same general pattern in their arrangements.

Track listing
No.	Title	Length
1.	"Battle Scene" (from Final Fantasy I - "Battle")	4:19
2.	"Clash on the Big Bridge" (from Final Fantasy V - "Battle on the Big Bridge")	4:16
3.	"Force Your Way" (from Final Fantasy VIII - "Force Your Way")	3:51
4.	"Battle, Scene II" (from Final Fantasy II - "Battle Scene 2")	3:52
5.	"The Decisive Battle" (from Final Fantasy VI - "The Decisive Battle")	4:02
6.	"Battle Theme" (from Final Fantasy VI - "Battle")	3:21
7.	"J-E-N-O-V-A" (from Final Fantasy VII - "JENOVA")	6:08
8.	"Those Who Fight Further" (from Final Fantasy VII - "Fight On!")	4:25
9.	"Dancing Mad" (from Final Fantasy VI - "Dancing Mad")	12:04
10.	"Fight With Seymour" (from Final Fantasy X - "Fight With Seymour")	5:05

=== The Black Mages II: The Skies Above ===
The Black Mages II: The Skies Above

Studio album by The Black Mages
- Released: December 22, 2004
- Genre: Hard rock Progressive metal
- Length: 50:56
- Label: Universal Music Group
- Producer: Nobuo Uematsu

The Black Mages II: The Skies Above is an arranged soundtrack album of video game music from the Final Fantasy series of role-playing video games. Like the previous album, it contains a selection of musical tracks from the games, arranged and performed in a hybrid of hard rock and progressive metal by The Black Mages. Unlike their first album, The Skies Above includes other pieces besides battle themes; the album also features songs, which were performed by Kazco Hamano, credited as "KAZCO", and Tomoaki Watanabe, or "Mr. Goo". It also includes a non-Final Fantasy track, "Blue Blast — Winning the Rainbow", an original piece that was created for Japanese K-1 fighter Takehiro Murahama. The Skies Above, as opposed to the first album, features real drums rather than sequenced drums, as the band had expanded from its original three members, none of whom played drums. The line "Maybe I'm a Lion" in the track of the same name was spoken by Alexander O. Smith, a translator for Square Enix and close friend of Okamiya, one of the new members. It was released on December 22, 2004, by Universal Music Group. The album spans eleven tracks, and covers a duration of 50:56.

The album received mixed reviews from critics; Jesse Jones of RPGFan said that he was "simply amazed" by the album, though it was not without flaws. While terming the music overall as "excellent", he disliked the vocal arrangements in "Otherworld" and "The Skies Above", finding that the voices of the singers did not match with the songs' instrumentals. Zane of Square Enix Music Online was less approving of the album, calling it "passable" and saying that the new arrangements gave "mixed results". He blamed the "intolerable vocals" and occasional poor choices in instruments as the problems with the album, concluding that the second Black Mages album was inferior to the first.

Track listing
No.	Title	Length
1.	"The Rocking Grounds" (from Final Fantasy III - "Battle 1")	3:56
2.	"Zeromus" (from Final Fantasy IV - "Zeromus")	3:51
3.	"Vamo' Alla Flamenco" (from Final Fantasy IX - "Vamo Alla Flamenco")	4:25
4.	"Hunter's Chance" (from Final Fantasy IX - "Hunter's Chance")	4:44
5.	"Otherworld" (from Final Fantasy X - "Otherworld")	3:14
6.	"Matoya's Cave" (from Final Fantasy I - "Matoya's Cave")	4:44
7.	"The Man with the Machine Gun" (from Final Fantasy VIII - "The Man with the Machine Gun")	4:17
8.	"Maybe I'm a Lion" (from Final Fantasy VIII - "Maybe I'm a Lion")	5:34
9.	"Battle with the Four Fiends" (from Final Fantasy IV - "Battle with the Four Fiends")	3:58
10.	"The Skies Above" (from Final Fantasy X - "To Zanarkand")	7:18
11.	"Blue Blast — Winning the Rainbow" (original track)	4:49

=== The Black Mages III: Darkness and Starlight ===
The Black Mages III: Darkness and Starlight

Studio album by The Black Mages
- Released: March 19, 2008
- Genre: Hard rock Progressive metal
- Length: 60:40
- Label: Dog Ear Records
- Producer: Nobuo Uematsu

The Black Mages III: Darkness and Starlight is the third arranged soundtrack album of video game music from the Final Fantasy series of role-playing video games. The album contains a selection of musical tracks from the games, arranged and performed in a hybrid of hard rock and progressive metal by The Black Mages in a similar manner to their previous albums. It was released on March 19, 2008, by Uematsu's Dog Ear Records, spanning ten tracks and a duration of 60:40. The Black Mages sing the chorus for the song "Darkness and Starlight", the only vocal track on the album. The album has been described as being composed of a mix of "intense" symphonic metal pieces and rock opera. Like the previous album, Darkness and Starlight features an original piece, "Life ~ in memory of KEITEN ~", which was composed by Uematsu for Yoshitaka Tagawa, a boy he had met who died of leukemia.

The album was well received by websites like RPGFan, which said the album was "very much worth the over three year wait" and described the tracks as "enjoyable" and "inspiring". He had few complaints with the album, only describing "Opening ~ Bombing Mission" and "Assault of the Silver Dragons" as "bland", but still worth listening to. Square Enix Music Online was even more positive in its review of the album, calling it "a masterpiece" and "The Black Mages' finest effort to date", wishing only the album had been longer.

Track listing
No.	Title	Length
1.	"Opening ~ Bombing Mission" (from Final Fantasy VII – "Opening ~ Bombing Mission")	4:39
2.	"Neo EXDEATH" (from Final Fantasy V – "The Final Battle")	4:39
3.	"The Extreme" (from Final Fantasy VIII – "The Extreme")	5:51
4.	"Assault of the Silver Dragons" (from Final Fantasy IX – "Assault of the Silver Dragons")	5:00
5.	"KURAYAMINOKUMO" (from Final Fantasy III – "This is The Last Battle")	4:56
6.	"Distant Worlds" (from Final Fantasy XI – "Distant Worlds")	7:31
7.	"Premonition" (from Final Fantasy VIII – "Premonition")	5:22
8.	"Grand Cross" (from Final Fantasy IX – "The Final Battle")	5:33
9.	"Darkness and Starlight" (from Final Fantasy VI – "Opera "Maria and Draco"")	15:32
10.	"Life ~ in memory of KEITEN ~" (original track)	1:37

=== Other appearances ===
In addition to their own albums, pieces from The Black Mages have appeared on several other albums. The first of these was "Flame Demon Monster Gaspard" on Dark Chronicle Premium Arrange, an album of arranged music from the video game Dark Chronicle originally composed by Tomohito Nishiura. The album was released on April 21, 2004, by Team Entertainment. Their next appearance was in the animated film Final Fantasy VII Advent Children and its corresponding soundtrack album, where they played—together with orchestration conducted by Koji Haijima—"Advent: One-Winged Angel", an arrangement of "One-Winged Angel" from Final Fantasy VII originally composed by Uematsu and arranged by Shirō Hamaguchi. Their third appearance was on the soundtrack album for the Nintendo DS version of Final Fantasy III, entitled Final Fantasy III Original Soundtrack, with one track then titled "Last Battle -THE BLACK MAGES Ver.-", but later re-titled "KURAYAMINOKUMO" (Cloud of Darkness) on the Darkness and Starlight album.

Other appearances
Year	Album	Comment
2004	Dark Chronicle Premium Arrange	The album features the song "Flame Demon Monster Gaspard" performed by the band.
2005	Final Fantasy VII: Advent Children	The album features the song "Advent: One-Winged Angel" performed by the band with orchestration.
2006	More Friends: Music from Final Fantasy	The concert album features the songs "The Rocking Grounds", "Maybe I'm a Lion" and "Advent: One-Winged Angel" performed by The Black Mages with orchestra and choir joining the band on the latter.
2006	Final Fantasy III Original Soundtrack	The album features the song "The Final Battle -THE BLACK MAGES Ver.-" performed by the band. It would later appear on The Black Mages III: Darkness and Starlight album under the title "KURAYAMINOKUMO".

== Concerts ==
While The Black Mages never toured as a band, they participated in several concert events. These include promotional concerts for the release of their three albums and appearances at orchestral concerts devoted to Final Fantasy music.

=== Promotional concerts ===
The Black Mages held a concert to promote their first album on April 26, 2003, in the Shibuya-AX concert hall in Shibuya, Tokyo, Japan. This overnight concert featured the full setlist from the album, and introduced the track "Matoya's Cave", which would be featured in their next album. While the band members were being introduced, Okamiya performed the Chocobo theme and Uematsu performed the intro to Deep Purple's "Smoke on the Water." A DVD recording of the show was made and given to Uematsu fanclub members that year. The concert was repeated on November 3, 2003, at Kanagawa University in Kanagawa, Japan. This free concert was part of the Kanagawa Jindai Festa. As Uematsu graduated from Kanagawa University, The Black Mages all wore the school's student uniform.

For their second album, The Black Mages performed two promotional concerts. They performed all the songs from their second album, along with "The Decisive Battle", "Those Who Fight Further" and "Clash on the Big Bridge" from their first album. These concerts featured Kenji Ito, who performed piano renditions of pieces from the SaGa series. Also featured were muZik, a group who performed seven techno and pop-style Final Fantasy arrangements. The first concert set was at Club Citta in Kawasaki, Japan on January 22 and 23, 2005, and the second one at Namba Hatch in Osaka, Japan on January 28, 2005. A DVD recording of the Kawasaki show was made and given to Uematsu fanclub members on February 1, 2006.

A live concert was performed for the release of The Black Mages' third album as for their previous albums. Performed at the Yokohama Blitz in Yokohama, Japan, on August 9, 2008, the concert featured all the pieces from the album with the exception of "Life ~ in memory of KEITEN ~" and with the addition of "Maybe I'm a Lion" and "Clash on the Big Bridge". A DVD recording of the show was made and released commercially in 2009, a first for the band.

=== Other concerts ===
In addition to their own concerts, The Black Mages made appearances at official Final Fantasy concerts. The first of these was the More Friends: Music from Final Fantasy event, held in the Gibson Amphitheatre in Los Angeles, California, on May 16, 2005; the concert was The Black Mages' first appearance in North America. The band performed "The Rocking Grounds" and "Maybe I'm a Lion" from their second album, and joined with the orchestra for "Advent: One-Winged Angel" as an encore to the concert. A recorded album was released on February 15, 2006, by Square Enix, and included the pieces by The Black Mages.

The second Final Fantasy concert The Black Mages performed at was the Voices - Music from Final Fantasy concert held in Yokohama, Japan on February 18, 2006. This concert featured performances of various Final Fantasy songs. The Black Mages played "Advent: One-Winged Angel" at the end of the concert along with the Prima Vista Philharmonic Orchestra; the song was played a second time as an encore. A DVD of the concert was released on June 21, 2006, and included an interview with Uematsu.

On July 7, 2007, The Black Mages appeared at the Extra: Hyper Game Music Event at Shinkiba Studio Coast in Tokyo. They were the last of thirteen artists and groups to play at the six-hour event, and performed "Last Battle", "Those Who Fight Further", "Maybe I'm a Lion" and "Clash on the Big Bridge". The music performed by The Black Mages did not appear on the official album for the concert.

== Band members ==
- Nobuo Uematsu – keyboards (2002–2010)
- Kenichiro Fukui – keyboards (2002–2010)
- Tsuyoshi Sekito – guitars (2002–2010)
- Keiji Kawamori – bass (2003–2010)
- Arata Hanyuda – drums (2003–2010)
- Michio Okamiya – guitars (2003–2010)
