= Final Fantasy Explorers =

2014 video game

- Game logo, designed by Yoshitaka Amano.
- Developers: Racjin; Square Enix
- Publisher: Square Enix
- Director: Atsushi Hashimoto
- Producer: Hiroyuki Miura
- Designer: Gen Kobayashi
- Artist: Toshiyuki Itahana
- Composer: Tsuyoshi Sekito
- Series: Final Fantasy
- Platform: Nintendo 3DS
- Release: JP: December 18, 2014; NA: January 26, 2016; EU: January 29, 2016
- Genre: Action role-playing
- Modes: Single-player, multiplayer

Final Fantasy Explorers (ファイナルファンタジー エクスプローラーズ, Fainaru Fantajī Ekusupurōrāzu) is an action role-playing video game for the Nintendo 3DS. It features character job-oriented combat against classic Final Fantasy monsters and summons. It was released in Japan in December 2014, and in North America and Europe in January 2016.

== Gameplay ==
Final Fantasy Explorers is an action role-playing video game featuring single-player and multiplayer modes. The player starts the game on an island featuring various locations, but can access other areas beyond the island on foot. The main goal of the player is to collect crystals scattered across the world. Unlike other narrative-driven entries in the Final Fantasy series, Explorers follows a quest-driven structure similar to Final Fantasy Crystal Chronicles and Capcom's Monster Hunter series. Quest difficulty can be manually adjusted. Unlike previous entries in the series, chocobos, a recurring galliforme bird in the series, are not available for riding. Player characters engage in fights with classic Final Fantasy enemies and summons including Ifrit and Bahamut.

There are four character slots available; the three ally slots can be filled with other human players or with monsters previously defeated in battle. Characters are assigned character jobs as with early Final Fantasy titles, including the White Mage, Black Mage, Monk, Paladin and Dragoon among others. Aside from these, there are also character jobs exclusive to the title. Players start the game as a Freelancer, able to adapt themselves to various skills before choosing specific jobs. There are over five hundred different pieces of equipment available for creation from material that is either found on the field or won in combat. The characters are given a maximum of eight skills to be used in battle, and can learn skills for certain jobs which can be used with other jobs when mastered. Using abilities costs a certain number of magic points, but costs less if a character uses a skill linked to a specific job. Skills can also be cancelled in battle. For multiplayer matches, a maximum of four players can use both the Nintendo Network and conventional Wi-Fi to enter a playing session.

== Premise ==
Explorers revolves around the titular group of explorers from the rural town of Libertas who hunt the world for crystals, objects which are the source of life and civilization for the world. The most major source of crystals is the new island of Amostra, but they are guarded by fearsome beasts that the explorers must fight.

== Development ==
The original concept for Final Fantasy Explorers was the brainchild of director Atsushi Hashimoto, who had previously worked on the Nintendo DS remake of Final Fantasy Legend II. Hashimito's original concept was for a multiplayer Final Fantasy role-playing game. One of the earliest design choices was the need for players to fight classic summoned monsters, as he felt that their presence would add an air of nostalgic familiarity to the game. The game's job system was developed at a later stage, when Hashimoto felt it would be a good fit with the multiplayer function. The music is composed by Tsuyoshi Sekito. When he began composing music for the title, he only had some pieces of key and concept art to go on, so was worried that he would not create the right kind of music. When he did meet the team, they were pleased with the results. The game's main theme was designed around the idea of the title characters, while also including darker elements such as "the suffering of the land". Explorers was first revealed in early June 2014 in Shonen Jump. The official website opened on June 16. Hashimoto's main goal was to create a game that was accessible for newcomers to the genre. Square Enix was making the game with the idea of turning it into a new action role-playing subseries.

== Reception ==
Reception

Aggregate score
| Aggregator | Score |
|---|---|
| Metacritic | 69/100 |

Review scores
| Publication | Score |
|---|---|
| Destructoid | 7/10 |
| Famitsu | 32/40 |
| Game Informer | 7.75/10 |
| GameSpot | 7/10 |
| Hardcore Gamer | 3.5/5 |
| IGN | 6.8/10 |
| Nintendo Life | 7/10 |
| Nintendo World Report | 7/10 |
| Polygon | 8/10 |

Final Fantasy Explorers received mixed reviews. It received an aggregated score of 69/100 based on 57 reviews on Metacritic.

IGN wrote: "For a few hours at least, Final Fantasy Explorers is a charming little adventure that's fun to play alone with your monster buddies or with real-life friends. But repetitive quests, the lack of a serious challenge until late in the story and a poor travel system eventually broke the charm spell that Explorers had cast upon me". GameSpot wrote: "The sheer number of quests and the complexity of customization will keep you busy for hours. If you like that sort of thing, that is. Even though its economy leaves a bit to be desired, it's not clunky enough to dissuade you from working hard to earn items and craft your ultimate armor".

Final Fantasy Explorers sold over 265,000 copies in Japan by the end of 2015.
