= Violent Storm =

1993 video game

- US arcade flyer
- Developer: Konami
- Publisher: Konami
- Composers: Kenichiro Fukui; Seiichi Fukami
- Platform: Arcade
- Release: NA/JP: 1993
- Genre: Beat'em up
- Modes: Single-player, multiplayer
- Arcade system: Mystic Warriors-based hardware

Violent Storm (Note: Japanese: バイオレントストーム, Hepburn: Baiorento Sutōmu) is a 1993 side-scrolling beat-'em-up for arcades produced by Konami.

== Plot ==
In the 1990s, World War III has at last ended. The people are left to pick up the pieces and rebuild their civilizations, but vicious gangs that prey on these defenseless citizens are obstructing the reconstruction.

The main protagonists are Boris, Wade and Kyle, three brave fighters who protect the fearful and helpless. Their largest problem is the corrupt, incorrigible, ruthless and lethal gang known as The Geld Gang. They have commissioned an array of thugs: purple-haired, leather-clad, chain-wielding, lead-pipe swinging, masked, martial artists, orange-mohawked, and men who use manhole covers as shields.

One day, when the trio is patrolling the streets, alert, ready and able to help those in need, they see a woman named Sheena (a friend of theirs) waving at them as she walks across the street from a supermarket with groceries. A moment later, Lord Geld's right-hand man, Red Freddy, snatches her away on his motorcycle. Now, the three braves must save Sheena from the grips of Lord Geld.

== Gameplay ==
In Violent Storm, up to three players can choose between Wade, Boris and Kyle, who have different fighting styles, speed and moves, some of which are hidden. Players must guide them through 7 different stages, in order of appearance: a declined town, a runaway train, in the taverns with trap doors, inside a metal furnace, a botanic garden, a bay area near the sea and finally Lord Geld's museum. Along the way, if the players clash with any enemy, they will wallop, sock, pommel, whip and slug against the players, sometimes with weapons like knives, lead pipes, bombs, bolts of electricity, spiked balls on chains, garbage cans, vise grips, molten metal and a myriad of other deadly armament.

== Characters ==
- Wade – the balanced character and the informal leader of the trio, his specialty is the uppercut.
- Boris – the powerhouse of the group with unmatched damage, he has four different devastating throws and backbreakers at his disposal, and is able to hit fallen enemies with the pipe.
- Kyle – the quick character of the three, whose lower damage is compensated for by his speed. He can fire off rapid kicks that are excellent at stopping charging enemies.

If Wade or Kyle attempt a regular throw on a heavy enemy or boss, the foe may sometimes free himself and flatten them instead (unless the player presses the Attack button repeatedly). Only Boris is capable of lifting all enemies above the ground to throw or piledrive them into a location of the player's choosing.

== Reception ==
In Japan, Game Machine listed Violent Storm on their November 1, 1993 issue as being the 21st most-successful table arcade unit at the time. In Europe, the game was selling well through January 1994. In North America, RePlay reported Violent Storm to be the tenth most-popular arcade game in July 1994.
