= All Star Pro-Wrestling =

2000 video game

- Developer(s): Square
- Publisher(s): Square
- Producer(s): Yusuke Hirata
- Composer(s): Tsuyoshi Sekito; Kenichiro Fukui; Kumi Tanioka
- Platform(s): PlayStation 2
- Release: JP: June 8, 2000
- Genre(s): Professional wrestling
- Mode(s): Single-player, multiplayer

All Star Pro-Wrestling (Note: オールスター・プロレスリング, Ōru Sutā Puro Resuringu) is a 2000 professional wrestling video game developed and published by Square for the PlayStation 2. It was the first wrestling game for the PlayStation 2 and was released only in Japan.

All Star Pro-Wrestling was released in a period in which Square sought to diversify its catalog by producing various non-role-playing games for the PlayStation 2. The game's control relied entirely on the DualShock 2's analog sticks, although a second mode using the normal buttons was also available.

While the quality of the game's graphics was lauded and sales were good during its month of release, the control was received negatively by critics, who felt it was awkward and unintuitive. Nevertheless, the game spawned two sequels, released in 2001 and 2003.

== Gameplay ==
Masahiro Chono fights Tadao Yasuda

All Star Pro-Wrestling is based on Japanese wrestling rather than American. The game can be played in several modes selected in the "Match Make" menu; these include exhibition matches, championships, tournaments, or leagues separated by weight. Depending on the mode chosen, different wrestling rings can be chosen to battle, as well as the referee and the time limit. 26 real-life wrestlers are initially available, notably Jyushin Thunder Liger, The Great Muta, Don Frye, Koji Kanemoto, Antonio Inoki, and Masahiro Chono.

Each battle begins with the wrestlers' entrance sequence. Two types of controls can be chosen to fight. The default one uses the DualShock 2's analog sticks exclusively; the left one being pressed for movements and the right one for attacks. Pins are executed by tilting both sticks up; pressing both sticks grabs the opponent, who can then be attacked or thrown depending on the way the right stick is tilted. The second type of controls, called "Type B", is closer to other fighting games and assigns pinning to the triangle button, grabbing to the square button, and punches and moves to the cross button. With Type B, the power of each move is determined by the level of pressure applied on the buttons. In both modes, the precise techniques available depend on the position and distance of the opponent, as well as a personal "tension meter" which builds up during battle. At any time, the D-pad can be used to change the angle of the camera.

Wrestlers return to full health after each match, and the game keeps track of the time of victories and records with the PlayStation 2 internal clock. A memory card can be used to save progress, battle snapshots, and match videos; the latter of which can either be ten-second long instant replays or up to three entire "Best Bout" matches. Hidden features include collectible autograph pictures of the defeated wrestlers; and a few unlockable characters, among whom are two female models in bikinis.

== Development ==
All Star Pro-Wrestling was announced in January 1999 as part of Square's desire to expand into more diverse game genres on the PlayStation 2 than their usual role-playing games. While DreamFactory developed most of Square's previous fighting games (namely Tobal No. 1, Tobal 2, and Ehrgeiz), Square decided to develop a wrestling game internally as DreamFactory was already working on The Bouncer, another Square title. The game was produced by Yusuke Hirata of Parasite Eve 2 fame, head of Square's Osaka-based fifth production team. The score, which was never released in album form, consists mostly of rock music and was composed by Tsuyoshi Sekito, Kenichiro Fukui, and Kumi Tanioka.

Square's aim with the title was to create some of the most realistic wrestlers seen in video games, with accurate details such as a faithful replication of body-muscle physics and facial expressions. Screenshots of the game were shown during the Square's "Millennium Event", a show held in January 2000 at Yokohama Arena (along with a playable version of Driving Emotion Type-S) and a battle was played in demonstration by Hirata itself and a young Japanese idol later in the Tokyo Game Show 2000 Spring at Makuhari Messe (March 31–April 2, 2000).

== Reception ==
All Star Pro-Wrestling topped the Japanese sale charts in its week of release with 107,331 copies sold, and continued to top the charts for the rest of the month of June. It was the 63rd best-selling video game of 2000 in Japan, with 185,616 copies. The game scored 31 out of 40 in the Japanese gaming magazine Famitsu, with the four reviewers highly praising the graphics but feeling that the controls, while not bad, could have been better implemented.

Jeff Gerstmann of GameSpot rated the game 4 out of 10, and criticized the battle system more severely along with IGN, which stated that the default analog controls are "mind-boggling", with pins being very difficult to execute whereas some other maneuvers can be chained with single button presses. The second type of controls was judged easier to play with by IGN, although one reviewer felt that it wears out the thumb quickly. On the contrary, Gerstmann felt that the second type is even more difficult to use than the default one. The number of moves available has been described as low even compared to lackluster titles such as WWF Attitude. Regarding the game's fluidity, Gerstmann and one IGN critic compared it to the speed of an "underwater soccer match", with smooth moves coexisting with simple, three-second long movements. The second IGN critic noted that the game is more of a wrestling simulation than an arcade title focused on entertainment.

Still, both GameSpot and IGN lauded the realism of the wrestlers' appearances, their faithfulness to those of their real-life counterparts, and the efficient use of the PlayStation 2 Emotion Engine. The spectacular ring entrance scenes and the amount of blood visible during battles was also appreciated. One IGN critic noted that the referee is always present on-screen, unlike many other wrestling games, but the other one said that the outdoor arenas "look like they were ripped out of a [Sega] Saturn game". He also criticized the presence of only two facial expressions for each wrestler; both IGN reviewers criticized the inconsistent collision detection and the lack of diversity in the crowd, who sometimes "look like they were made out of Legos". Gerstmann added that the walking looks particularly unrealistic, in contrast with the other animations.

While both IGN reviewers noted the sparcity of the audio commentary and crowd shouting, one critic felt the sound was adequate albeit less impressive than the graphics. GameSpot called the sound decent and well executed. Finally, the omission of features such as weapons and modes such as "create-a-wrestler", steel cage match, battle royal, and multiplayer tag team, was felt as a very noticeable weak point compared to American wrestling games present on the market (WWF SmackDown! as an example).

== Sequels ==
A sequel titled All Star Pro-Wrestling II was released on November 22, 2001 for the PlayStation 2. It addressed the controls issue by replacing it with a new, more standard battle system, and included wrestlers from three real-life Japanese wrestling federations: New Japan Pro-Wrestling, Pro Wrestling Noah, and Pro Wrestling Zero-One. The game also scored 31 out of 40 in Famitsu. A third installment, All Star Pro-Wrestling III was released by Square Enix on August 7, 2003 for the same platform. It included a create-a-wrestler feature.

Both sequels added multiplayer tag team and battle royal modes, playable using a multitap with up to 5 players at a time (4 wrestlers and the referee). Tsuyoshi Sekito returned to score the two soundtracks. The All Star Pro-Wrestling II Original Soundtrack was published by DigiCube on January 23, 2002, while the third game's soundtrack was not published in album form.
