= Dog Ear Records =

Japanese record label

Dog Ear Records is a music production company and record label founded by composer Nobuo Uematsu in November 2006. The company publishes video game soundtracks and original albums on disc and digitally through iTunes. The website includes community features including a bilingual blog, YouTube channel, radio program and information related to live performances taking place in the Tokyo area.

== Overview ==
The company is based in the Meguro area of the city of Tokyo, Japan. In February 2007, the "DERBLOG" weblog launched, reporting on the company's releases and live events. In October, of the same year, an online radio program called "Inu Mimi Radio" began, hosted by Uematsu. The show invited guests including participants of The Black Mages concert series, including Kenichiro Fukui, Michio Okamiya, and Arata Hanyuda. The first Dog Ear Records live showcase took place November 24, 2008, and featured Keita Egusa, a pianist whose album "KALAYCILAR" was published by the record label.

== History ==
The first international event Dog Ear Records participated in took place October 20, 2007, in Stockholm, Sweden. Distant Worlds: Music from Final Fantasy featured selections from Uematsu's music from the Final Fantasy series performed by the Royal Stockholm Philharmonic Orchestra. Shortly thereafter, the company organized a live event on November 19 titled "Microsoft Presents 'Orchestral Pieces from LOST ODYSSEY & BLUE DRAGON'" taking place at the Bunkamura Orchard Hall in Tokyo. In March 2008, Dog Ear Records announced the release of the album THE BLACK MAGES III Darkness and Starlight. A live concert took place at the Yokohama Blitz in August. The same month, the company began international digital releases via the iTunes Store.

== Staff ==
- Nobuo Uematsu
- Hiroki Ogawa
- Itsuki Iwasa
- Tsutomu Narita
- Michio Okamiya

== Discography ==
2006

- Blue Dragon

2007

- Anata wo Yurusanai
- Lost Odyssey

2008

- The Black Mages III - Darkness and Starlight
- KALAYCILAR
- saru monkey breaks

2009

- Lord of Vermilion
- Sakura Note: Ima ni Tsunagaru Mirai

2010

- Xenoblade Chronicles

2011

- The Last Story
- Earthbound Papas: Octave Theory

2012

- Fantasy Life

2013

- Earthbound Papas: Dancing Dad
