= Final Fantasy III (2006 video game) =

2006 role-playing game remake

- Japanese Nintendo DS cover art
- Developers: Matrix Software; Square Enix
- Publisher: Square Enix
- Director: Hiromichi Tanaka
- Producer: Tomoya Asano
- Artist: Akihiko Yoshida
- Composers: Tsuyoshi Sekito; Keiji Kawamori
- Series: Final Fantasy
- Platforms: Nintendo DS, iOS, Android, PlayStation Portable, Ouya, Windows Phone, Windows
- Release: Nintendo DS: JP: August 24, 2006; NA: November 14, 2006; AU: May 3, 2007; EU: May 4, 2007; iOS: WW: March 24, 2011; Android: WW: March 1, 2012; PlayStation Portable: JP: September 20, 2012; NA: September 25, 2012; PAL: September 26, 2012; Ouya: WW: April 11, 2013; Windows Phone: WW: December 27, 2013; Windows: NA/EU: May 27, 2014; JP: February 28, 2020
- Genre: Role-playing
- Modes: Single-player, multiplayer

Final Fantasy III (Note: Japanese: ファイナルファンタジーIII, Hepburn: Fainaru Fantajī Surī) is a 2006 role-playing video game developed by Matrix Software and published by Square Enix for the Nintendo DS. It is a remake of the 1990 Famicom game Final Fantasy III, and marks the first time the game was released outside of Japan since its original launch.

A port was released for iOS on March 24, 2011. It was followed by an Android port on March 12, 2012, a PlayStation Portable port in late September 2012 (downloadable-only format outside Japan via PlayStation Network) and a Windows port via Steam in 2014 in the west and in 2020 in Japan with further updates.

== Plot ==
Main characters of the 3D remake (from left to right): Luneth, Arc, Refia, and Ingus.

The original storyline of Final Fantasy III is retained with the main change being that the main characters are given unique appearances (designed by Akihiko Yoshida), backstories, personalities and names (by Hiromichi Tanaka): Luneth (ルーネス, Rūnesu), an adventurous orphan boy raised in the village of Ur; Arc (アルクゥ, Arukwu), Luneth's best friend and a timid yet intelligent young man; Refia (レフィア), a girl raised in the village of Kazus who tires of her father's blacksmith training and often runs away from home; and Ingus (イングズ, Inguzu), a loyal soldier serving the King of Sasune, with a mutual soft spot for the princess Sara.

== Development ==
Following the failure to remake the game for the WonderSwan Color, and Square's merger with former competitor Enix to form Square Enix in 2003, the company posted assurance that the game's promised remake would not be completely forgotten, and there was speculation that it might find its way to Sony's PlayStation or Nintendo's Game Boy Advance as its predecessors had. The port was originally being designed for the PlayStation 2, but Square Enix was eventually convinced by Nintendo to make it for their new handheld system, the Nintendo DS, a decision that would later be positively reinforced by the commercial success of the Nintendo DS. The Final Fantasy III remake was first announced in October 2004, but detailed information did not emerge for a year. Hiromichi Tanaka headed the project as both the executive producer and director. His guidance and supervision were needed because the remake was not a mere graphical update as Final Fantasy and Final Fantasy II's remakes were, but a total overhaul using the Nintendo DS's 3D capabilities. Along with 3D graphics, a full motion video opening scene was produced for the game, similar to those found in the ports of the 2D Final Fantasy games for the PlayStation. Programming was handled by developer Matrix Software.

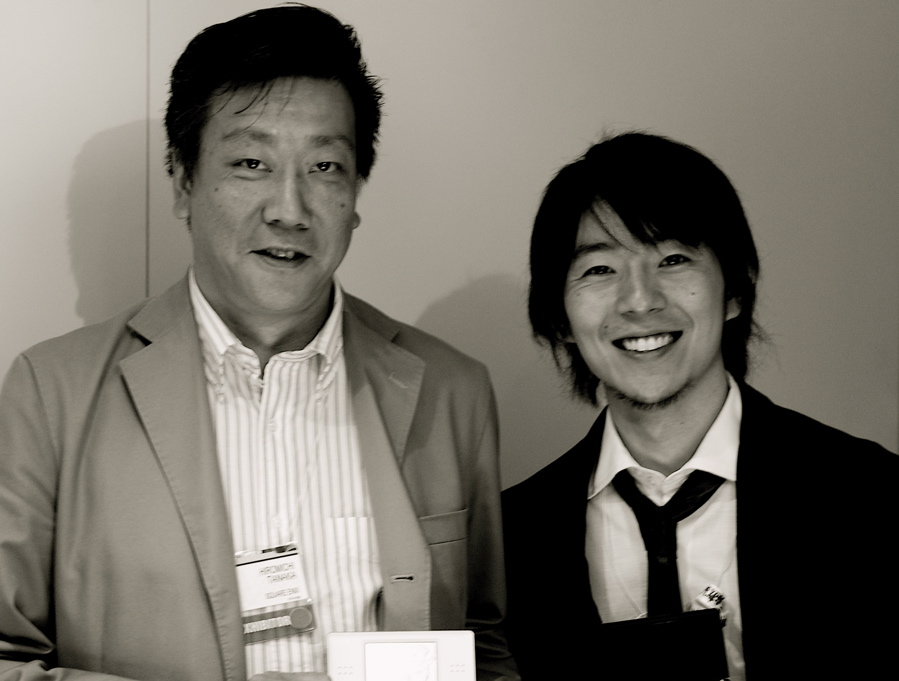
Hiromichi Tanaka and Tomoya Asano

The remake was produced by Tomoya Asano and co-developed by Square Enix and Matrix Software. Ryosuke Aiba (Final Fantasy XI) served as art director, and Akihiko Yoshida (Final Fantasy XII) redesigned the original characters for use in 3D, and designed the look of the new playable characters. The formerly generic and nameless party characters were replaced with more concrete characters with new personalities and background stories, and additional scenes were added to develop their individuality. The main storyline however was not altered significantly. Along with these four, additional characters (called "sub-characters") also join the party temporarily, like in the original. Unlike the original, however, these characters may randomly participate in battle.

The team recounted how the protagonists of the original version of the game, the four Onion Knights, lacked personalities as a direct response to the focus on characters and story of Final Fantasy II, with III following the original game in this regard. For the remake, after characters and story focus had become a staple of the series following Final Fantasy IV, Tanaka decided to give the four protagonists names and personalities. He named the characters in the remake according to Asano. Originally the characters were planned to be given much larger personalities which played roles in the plot of the game, but the team was concerned about alienating existing fans of the game as it was a remake of a well liked game instead of an entirely new title, and therefore the new characters personalities only mostly affected the game's "introduction and the ending" as described by Asano and Tanaka.

The remake features a redesigned job system, which rebalances the classes, adds new abilities and adds a new "Freelancer" class which replaces the "Onion Knight" as the default job at the beginning of the game (Onion Knight is retained as a secret class). It also includes new events, a new crystal and dungeon, and the removal of capacity points. Unlike the original Famicom version, most of the jobs remain useful for the entire game. The ultimate jobs—the Ninja and the Sage—and some of the lesser-used jobs, like the Geomancer, were redesigned to have the same level of abilities as the Warrior. Another addition are special job-specific items available only if a character has fully mastered a certain job.

In place of capacity points, each character incurs a small temporary penalty for switching jobs. This penalty decreases the character's statistics for the next zero to ten battles. This period is called a "Job Transition Phase" and its length is based on how similar the new job is to the old job, and how proficient the character already is at the new job.

The team considered adding save points to the Crystal Tower, the final dungeon of the original game which was criticized due to its long length and lack of save points and HP/MP restoration points, but ultimately decided to not alter the original design and not to add them. These elements would eventually be added to the 2D Pixel Remaster version of the game.

The remake uses the Nintendo DS's Wi-Fi to allow the player to send email to others and unlock sidequests. Players are also able to send mail to various characters in the game as well as to other players. An interruption-save option is also available that lets the player turn off the DS and continue when turning it back on. Like in the original, there is no way to make permanent saves while inside a dungeon.

The score was arranged for the Nintendo DS remake by Tsuyoshi Sekito and Keiji Kawamori, working under Uematsu's supervision. The soundtrack was released as an album by NTT Publishing in 2006 as Final Fantasy III Original Soundtrack, with revamped versions of the tracks plus some additional tracks.

An iOS port of the DS remake was released on March 24, 2011, on the App Store. Both the gameplay and graphics were improved, and the sound was remastered, but the Mail/Mognet to other players was removed, with the Onion Knight job available via another quest.

An Android port of the iOS remaster was released in June 2012 on Google Play. A PlayStation Portable port of that same version was released on September 20 the same year, albeit in a downloadable-only format outside Japan where it was released later that month. In April 2013, Square Enix released a high-definition port of the Android version for the Ouya console as a launch title. The Android version was also ported to Windows Phones on December 27, 2013.

An HD port of the mobile version was released for Steam on May 27, 2014, in the west. The Steam version was released in Japan on February 28, 2020, alongside an update for all versions that added an auto battle function, 2x speed mode in battle, improved user interface, and 16:9 and 21:9 widescreen modes. This port was later released to GOG.com on January 29, 2026.

== Reception ==
Reception

Aggregate scores
Aggregator	Score
GameRankings	DS: 78%
Metacritic	DS: 77/100 iOS: 80/100; PC: 68/100

Review scores
Publication	Score
1Up.com	DS: B+
Famitsu	DS: 34/40; PSP: 33/40
GamePro	DS: 4/5
GameSpy	DS: 8/10
GameTrailers	DS: 8.2/10
IGN	DS: 7.8/10
Nintendo Power	DS: 8/10
TouchArcade	iOS: 4/5

The DS remake met with high sales. IGN notes that "interest in FFIII should come as no surprise given...the popularity of the DS". The game sold 500,000 units within the first week in Japan, beating Square Enix's original prediction that they would only sell 350,000. According to Enterbrain, by the end of 2006 the remake sold over 935,000 copies in Japan. As of August 2007, the game has sold 990,000 units in Japan and 460,000 units in North America. By August 2008, it has sold 480,000 units in Europe. This adds up to total worldwide sales of 1.93 million units for the DS version, and 3.33 million units for the Famicom and DS versions combined, as of August 2008. The PSP port sold over 80,000 copies in Japan by the end of 2012.

Reviews of the DS remake of Final Fantasy III were mostly positive, with the game holding an aggregate score of 77% on GameRankings. 1UP.com described the gameplay as an RPG for dedicated RPG enthusiasts, and noted that while the job system had been heavily improved over the original title, it still felt at times very limiting. The review however said that it was important to remember Final Fantasy III as "a slice of history and a missing piece of a blockbuster series", citing that "hardcore RPG players" may enjoy the title more than other Final Fantasy games and calling it "one of the best portable RPGs to date". GameSpy argued that one's enjoyment hinged "entirely on your desire to play a game with decidedly archaic game mechanics that may seem primitive and uninviting" compared to other recent Square Enix titles, noting the game was "quite challenging" and adding that "some people live for this stuff, but others may be annoyed at the game's often unfriendly nature".

GameTrailers criticised the game's simple plot and the party members as generic, but praised the game's scenarios. It additionally noted that while players should expect to have to do some grinding, the game offers lots of areas to explore. IGN described the game as one that may be "amazingly frustrating for the now mainstream Final Fantasy fan", and noted that while the unique concept of the job system was one that "simply blew gamers' minds" at the time, in the contemporary environment, comparing it to Final Fantasy XII's license board system was "literally no contest". The review additionally argued that the remake hampered the game, citing that battles that would take "mere seconds to scroll through" were now "lengthened to nearly a minute". Another complaint was in the game's presentation on the Nintendo DS, noting that the handheld's top screen was inactive for "75% of the game" and that even displaying only artwork on the screen during those periods would have been a preferable outcome. However IGN praised the graphics and musical score, and also stated that the transition from 2D to 3D was "a good call".

The Academy of Interactive Arts & Sciences nominated Final Fantasy III for "Role-Playing Game of the Year" at the 10th Annual Interactive Achievement Awards.
