= Kazco Hamano =

Japanese singer (born 1970)

Kazco
- Born: Kazuko Hamano; 19/1/1970
- Origin: Japan
- Genres: j-pop
- Years active: 1993–present
- Website: http://www.kazco.info/

Hamano Kazuko (born January 19, 1970) is a Japanese singer and member of the GREAT TOUR BAND. Hamano sings the chorus, supporting Van Tomiko. Her popularity, due to her lively and energetic live performances, has led her to release two solo CDs. She is also well known for her performance on The Black Mages' song Otherworld.

She provides the main vocals for the theme song of the video game White Knight Chronicles, titled Travelers. It was performed live at the "White Knight Chronicles Secret Party" held by the game's developer, Level-5. She has also provided the vocals for the opening theme song for a video game called SkyGunner.

== Discography ==
Album	Released
Deep Breath	09/10/2001
Side [ b ]	01/01/2004
