= Earthbound Papas =

Japanese progressive metal band

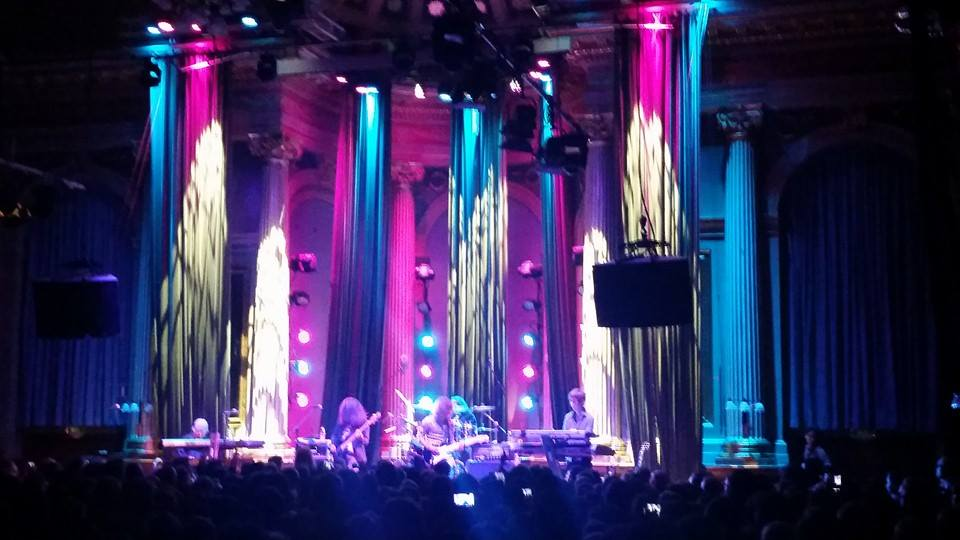
- Earthbound Papas performing in Stockholm in 2014

Background information
- Origin: Japan
- Genres: Progressive metal; symphonic metal; Nintendocore; instrumental rock; progressive rock
- Years active: 2011–present
- Label: Dog Ear Records
- Members: Nobuo Uematsu; Michio Okamiya; Yoshitaka Hirota; Tsutomu Narita; Chihiro Fujioka
- Past members: Arata Hanyuda

The Earthbound Papas are a Japanese progressive rock/metal band performing songs and interpretations of music from video games, notably including the Final Fantasy series. Nobuo Uematsu, the acclaimed composer of music in the Final Fantasy series, formed the band after his previous band, The Black Mages, disbanded in 2010. In addition to new arrangements of some Final Fantasy tracks, they have also arranged tracks from other projects that featured Uematsu as a composer and they have produced original compositions for the band's albums.

In 2010, the Earthbound Papas were featured on the Distant Worlds II: More Music from Final Fantasy live orchestral release, in which they joined the orchestra for a performance of the song Dancing Mad from Final Fantasy VI.

The band have also worked on Hyperdimension Neptunia Victory and Megadimension Neptunia VII alongside internal Idea Factory composer Kenji Kaneko.

== Discography ==
Albums

- Octave Theory - 2011

Octave Theory - Track listing
No.	Title	Length
1.	"Introduction ~ Octopus Theory"	6:34
2.	"Liberi Fatali" (from Final Fantasy VIII)	4:48
3.	"Advent: One Winged Angel" (from Final Fantasy VII Advent Children)	6:12
4.	"Thread of Fate" (from Guin Saga)	5:45
5.	"Metal Hypnotized"	5:11
6.	"Eternity" (from Blue Dragon)	4:46
7.	"The Forest of Thousand Years"	6:02
8.	"Bo-Kon-Ho-Ko" (from Lost Odyssey)	5:56
9.	"Homecoming"	3:34

- Dancing Dad - 2013

Dancing Dad - Track listing
No.	Title	Length
1.	"Homecoming Again - Opening Fanfare" (for Symphonic Odysseys)	4:38
2.	"Doppelgänger"	5:08
3.	"Fight With Seymour" (from Final Fantasy X)	5:24
4.	"La petite malice du Kijimunaa"	4:07
5.	"Toneless" (from Anata no yurusanai)	5:31
6.	"Interlude - Anthony's Dream"	4:18
7.	"Delight of the Victors" (from Hyperdimension Neptunia Victory)	4:50
8.	"LORD of VERMILLION" (from LORD of VERMILLION)	5:35
9.	"Dancing Mad" (from Final Fantasy VI)	12:34
10.	"Watashi no Mizu To Sora (from Blue Dragon)	3:49
