= Kenichiro Fukui =

Japanese video game composer (born 1970)

- Born: March 4, 1970 (age 56); Hyōgo, Japan
- Genre: Electronic rock
- Occupations: Composer, musician, keyboardist
- Instruments: Piano, organ, guitar, drums, keyboard
- Years active: 1991–present
- Labels: Universal Music Group; Dog Ear Records

Kenichiro Fukui (福井 健一郎, Fukui Ken'ichirō) is a Japanese video game composer and electronic rock musician. Before working at Square Enix, he was employed at Konami. He was also an arranger and a keyboardist in the band The Black Mages. Additionally, Fukui arranged Angela Aki's "Kiss Me Good-Bye" from Final Fantasy XII. In October 2007, he left Square Enix to become a lecturer, although he continued to work with The Black Mages until the band dissolved in 2010, and continued to do freelance work with video games. His Konami Kukeiha Club nickname was "Funiki Fukui". He lives in Yokohama, Japan.

== Biography ==
Fukui was born on March 4, 1970, in Hyōgo Prefecture. He joined the video game company Konami in 1991. While there, he contributed to the soundtracks of Lethal Enforcers, G.I. Joe and Violent Storm. He was also one of the keyboardists for the Kukeiha Club, and played in the live event at the Budokan in Tokyo.

In 1995, he moved to Osaka to join "Solid", a subsidiary of Square (now Square Enix). He was later transferred to Square's main office in Tokyo. While there, he wrote music for games such as Einhänder, Front Mission 5: Scars of the War, and Project Sylpheed, and did arrangements for Final Fantasy VII: Advent Children and Hanjuku Hero 4: 7-Jin no Hanjuku Hero. He played the keyboard and organ for 2005's Romancing SaGa: Minstrel Song, the first game he worked on for which he neither composed nor arranged the music.

In 2000, Fukui and Tsuyoshi Sekito formed an experimental partnership to compose music for the video game All Star Pro-Wrestling in a rock style. After the game's success, the two continued to compose in the same style. In 2002, Fukui and Sekito decided to arrange some of the compositions of Nobuo Uematsu, the primary composer for the music of the Final Fantasy series. Uematsu, a fan of rock music, enjoyed these arrangements, and Fukui and Sekito asked him to join them in making a rock band. Declining at first due to feeling too busy with his composing duties and attempts to become a music producer with his Smile Please label, Uematsu agreed to join them in a single live performance as a keyboardist, and afterwards decided to join the two in making The Black Mages; Fukui and Sekito had refused to start one if Uematsu was not involved as one of the musicians. The band went on to produce three albums before dissolving in 2010; while some of the members went on to form the Earthbound Papas, Fukui was not one of them.

In 2007, Fukui was appointed at the HAL College of Tokyo (which opened in spring 2009), to teach classes relating to music composition and performance.

== Discography ==
=== Video game soundtracks ===
Sound Effects

- Sunset Riders (1991)

Composer

- The Lone Ranger (1991) – with Yoshinori Sasaki, Kenichi Matsubara, Kozo Nakamura, Tomoya Tomita and Satoko Miyawaki
- Lethal Enforcers (1992)
- G.I. Joe (1992) – with Tsutomu Ogura
- Quiz Gakumon no Susume (1993) - with Yoshiyuki Hagiwara, Minako Matsuhira and Akihiro Juichiya
- Violent Storm (1993) – with Seiichi Fukami
- Racin' Force (1994) - with Tsutomu Ogura
- Einhänder (1997)
- All Star Pro-Wrestling (2000) – with Tsuyoshi Sekito and Kumi Tanioka
- All Star Pro-Wrestling II (2002) – with Tsuyoshi Sekito
- Front Mission 5: Scars of the War (2005) – with Hidenori Iwasaki, Hayato Matsuo, Yasuhiro Yamanaka and Masayoshi Soken
- Project Sylpheed (2006) – with Takahiro Nishi, Junya Nakano, Kumi Tanioka and Keigo Ozaki
- Lord of Arcana (2010) – with Nobuo Uematsu and Satoshi Henmi
- Espgaluda II HD (2011) – with music group KAY
- Galaxy Voyager (2018) - with various others
- Kingdom Hearts III (2019) – with various others
- G.I. Joe: Wrath of Cobra (2024) – with Tee Lopes, Andrew One and Anton Corazza

Arranger

- Hanjuku Hero 4 ~The 7 Heroes~ (2005) – with Michio Okamiya
- Final Fantasy XII (2006)
- Final Fantasy XII: Revenant Wings (2007) – with Kimihiro Abe, Mitsuhiro Kaneda and Noriyuki Kamikura
- Final Fantasy IV (Nintendo DS) (2007) – with Junya Nakano
- Otomedius Gorgeous (2008)
- Final Fantasy XIV (2010) – with Tsutomu Narita
- Otomedius Excellent (2011) – with various others
- Imperial SaGa Eclipse (2019) - with various others
- Final Fantasy VII Remake (2020)

=== Film soundtracks ===
Arrangement

- Final Fantasy VII Advent Children (2005)

=== Other works ===
- Konami All-Stars -The 1000-Ryo Box Heisei 4th Year Edition (1991)
- Xexex Original Soundtrack (1992) – CD exclusive arrangement 'Breeze'
- Kukeiha Club ~ Hope (1993)
- The Black Mages (2003)
- The Black Mages II: The Skies Above (2004)
- The Black Mages III: Darkness and Starlight (2008)
- Mushihimesama Double Arrange Album (2009)
- DeathSmiles Arrange Album (2010)
- Hoshi no Kashu (2011)
- SPARKING!!! (2011)
- Moeyo! Kung-Fu Lady Dragon Original Soundtrack & Remixes (2018)
- dodonpachi DAI-OU-JOU Re:incarnation -SAISEIROKU- (2023)
- Battle Garegga 30th Anniv. Remix (2026)
