= DigiCube =

Japanese video game merchandise company

DigiCube Co., Ltd.
- Type: Public
- Traded as: JASDAQ: 7589
- Industry: Video games Wholesale; Publishing
- Founded: February 6, 1996; 30 years ago
- Defunct: November 26, 2003
- Fate: Bankruptcy
- Headquarters: Tokyo, Japan
- Owner: Square Enix

DigiCube Co., Ltd. (株式会社デジキューブ; Kabushiki-gaisha Dejikyūbu) was a Japanese company established as a subsidiary of software developer Square on February 6, 1996 and headquartered in Tokyo, Japan. The primary purpose of DigiCube was to market and distribute Square products, most notably video games and related merchandise, including toys, books, and music soundtracks. DigiCube served as a wholesaler to distributors, and was noteworthy for pioneering the sale of video games in Japanese convenience stores and vending machine kiosks.

== History ==
At the close of 1997, DigiCube reported that their vending machine service had exceeded 10 million software units since the service launched in November 1996. At its peak in 1998, DigiCube recorded sales of 8.6 million units, equaling ¥46.8 billion JPY. Digicube started carrying the PlayStation 2 in March 2000, with sales of 100,000 consoles and 400,000 games. By May 2000, the company offered thirty-one software titles from fourteen different companies. In February 2001, after a thaw in relations between Nintendo and Square, Digicube began distributing Game Boy games for the first time.

In the following years, however, sales declined precipitously. Although ownership of DigiCube was passed to the newly created Square Enix following the merger of Square with its former rival Enix in early 2003, it was already approximately 9.5 billion yen in debt. Following the announcement that the much-anticipated Final Fantasy XII would be delayed until sometime in 2004 (eventually released in 2006), DigiCube filed for bankruptcy liquidation at the Tokyo District Court on November 26, 2003. The bankruptcy would cost the newly merged Square Enix ¥760 million JPY. The bankruptcy also caused a 3.6% drop in Square Enix's stock with the announcement, and other Japanese stocks were affected.

== Releases ==
=== Music ===
Starting with Tobal No. 1 Original Sound Track in 1996, DigiCube published soundtracks of Square and Square Enix video games, as well as a few soundtracks of video games from other companies and a few non-video game-related albums. The last release was Piano Collections: Final Fantasy VII in 2003. The planned release of Front Mission 4 Plus 1st Original Soundtrack was cancelled following DigiCube's demise, although it and most of DigiCube's catalog was eventually re-printed by Square Enix. Digicube released 80 video game soundtrack albums during its existence, generally from games developed or published by Square/Square Enix, as well as 8 other albums.

=== Perfect Works ===
Perfect Works is a series of video game-related books published by DigiCube. Only three books were published: the first was dedicated to Xenogears and printed in October 1998 in Japan. One book dedicated to SaGa Frontier 2 and another one dedicated to Front Mission 3 were released in 1999.

These books contain artwork, timelines and detailed descriptions of events of the related games. The Xenogears Perfect Works notably contains detailed information of the world where the game is set, giving in-depth descriptions of the characters, creatures, geographical and historical settings, covering all the intended six episodes of Xenogears.

=== Ultimania ===
The Final Fantasy XII Scenario Ultimania

Ultimania (アルティマニア, Arutimania; a portmanteau of ultimate and mania) is a series of video game books originally published in Japan by DigiCube and written by Studio BentStuff. Although they are primarily known as a resource for the Final Fantasy series, there have also been Ultimania guides published for several other Square Enix titles, including the SaGa series, Legend of Mana, Chrono Cross, Vagrant Story and the Kingdom Hearts series. In addition to providing information on how to complete their respective games, the guides primarily focus on commentary from the staff, original art designs and extended information about the game's storyline and characters. After DigiCube's bankruptcy, Square Enix has published the books directly.
