= Tsuyoshi Sekito =

Japanese composer and musician (born 1963)

- 関戸 剛
- Born: April 3, 1963 (age 63); Osaka Prefecture, Japan
- Education: Kansai Gaidai University
- Occupations: Composer, musician, guitarist
- Years active: 1989–present
- Employer: Square Enix
- Musical career
- Genres: Rock, video game music
- Instrument: Electric guitar

Tsuyoshi Sekito (関戸 剛, Sekito Tsuyoshi; born April 3, 1963) is a Japanese video game composer, arranger, and musician who has been employed at Square Enix since 1995. As a composer, he is best known for scoring Brave Fencer Musashi (1998), Final Fantasy VII: Advent Children (2005) and The Last Remnant (2008). He also plays the guitar in the rock bands The Black Mages and The Star Onions; both groups arrange and perform compositions from the Final Fantasy series.

== Biography ==
Sekito was born in Osaka, Japan. His career as a video game composer began at the end of the 1980s when he joined Konami's sound team. The first game he scored was Space Manbow in 1989. The following year, he created the music for SD Snatcher and Metal Gear 2: Solid Snake along with several other composers. He was subsequently assigned to score the sports titles Double Dribble: 5-on-5 (1991) and Soccer Superstars (1995) and the cartoon adaptations Teenage Mutant Ninja Turtles II: Back from the Sewers (1991) and Tiny Toon Adventures: Buster's Hidden Treasure (1993), often as the leading composer. In 1994, he created the soundtrack to the arcade game Lethal Enforcers II: Gunfighters with Yuichi Sakakura. He left Konami in 1995 to join the Osaka branch of Square.

After joining Square, Sekito did not compose any games until 1998; his first assignment for the company was to create the music for Brave Fencer Musashi. In 1999, he assisted in scoring the soundtrack to Chocobo's Dungeon 2 by creating 12 pieces. His fellow composers were Kumi Tanioka and Kenji Ito. The following year, he composed music for the Japan-only All Star Pro-Wrestling along with Kenichiro Fukui and Tanioka. Sekito went solo for the game's sequel, All Star Pro-Wrestling II (2001), and was joined by Fukui again for the third and final installment, All Star Pro-Wrestling III (2003).

In 2002, after Sekito and Fukui's collaboration on All Star Pro-Wrestling, they decided to arrange some of the pieces in the Final Fantasy series, composed by Nobuo Uematsu. The two presented their arrangements to Uematsu who enjoyed their work. Although hesitant at first, Uematsu agreed to join Sekito and Fukui in forming the rock band The Black Mages; Sekito served as the group's guitarist. In 2003, Keiji Kawamori, Arata Hanyuda, and Michio Okamiya also joined the band. The Black Mages have released three studio albums, and have appeared at several concerts to promote their albums.

To create the music for The Last Remnant, Sekito utilized his guitar collection for different tracks and used different guitar sounds and techniques including detuning and delay effects on the album. Sekito did not use an orchestra for the game's music, but chose particular instruments and players to make the music an assortment of the best for each part.

In Kingdom Hearts 3D: Dream Drop Distance, Sekito felt unrestricted while composing music for the Nintendo 3DS, saying that he was able to create songs that would make a game player feel that were in a large world even on a small device due to the game console's 3D graphics.

For the game Final Fantasy Explorers, Sekito had to begin composing music with very few visual effects finished, and thus composed a wide variety of music to fit however it turned out.

== Musical style and influences ==
Sekito cites heavy metal bands Van Halen and Dream Theater and film score composer Jerry Goldsmith as musical influences.

== Works ==
=== Video games ===
Year	Title	Notes
1989	Motocross Maniacs	Music with Michiru Yamane
1989	Space Manbow	Music with Michiru Yamane and Yuji Takenouchi
1990	SD Snatcher	Music with several others
1990	Metal Gear 2: Solid Snake	Music with several others
1991	Double Dribble: 5-on-5	Music
1991	Teenage Mutant Ninja Turtles II: Back from the Sewers	Music with Yuko Kurahashi
1993	Tiny Toon Adventures: Buster's Hidden Treasure	Music with Shinji Tasaka and Hideto Inoue
1994	Lethal Enforcers II: Gunfighters	Music with Yuichi Sakakura
1995	Soccer Superstars	Music
1998	Brave Fencer Musashi	Music
1998	Chocobo's Dungeon 2	Music with Kumi Tanioka, Yasuhiro Kawakami, and Kenji Ito
1999	Chrono Trigger (PlayStation ver.)	Arrangements
1999	Final Fantasy Chronicles	Arrangements
2000	All Star Pro-Wrestling	Music with Kenichiro Fukui, Naoshi Mizuta, and Kumi Tanioka
2001	All Star Pro-Wrestling II	Music
2002	Final Fantasy Origins	Arrangements
2003	All Star Pro-Wrestling III	Music with Kenichiro Fukui
2005	Romancing SaGa -Minstrel Song-	Music with Kenji Ito
2005	Hanjuku Hero 4: 7-Jin no Hanjuku Hero	Music with several others
2005	Front Mission Online	Arrangements
2006	Dawn of Mana	Music with Kenji Ito, Masayoshi Soken and Ryuichi Sakamoto
2006	Final Fantasy III (Nintendo DS)	Arrangements with Keiji Kawamori
2008	The Last Remnant	Music with Yasuhiro Yamanaka
2008	Dissidia: Final Fantasy	Arrangements with Takeharu Ishimoto and Mitsuto Suzuki
2009	Gyromancer	Music
2009	Death by Cube	Music with Mud-J
2010	Kingdom Hearts Birth by Sleep	Music with Yoko Shimomura and Takeharu Ishimoto
2010	The 3rd Birthday	Music with Yoko Shimomura and Mitsuto Suzuki
2011	Fantasy Earth: Zero Chronicles	Music with Hidenori Iwasaki and Ryo Yamazaki
2011	MindJack	Music
2011	Dissidia 012 Final Fantasy	Arrangements with Keiji Kawamori and Mitsuto Suzuki
2011	Lord of Vermilion Re:2	Arrangements with several others
2012	Kingdom Hearts 3D: Dream Drop Distance	Music with Yoko Shimomura and Takeharu Ishimoto
2014	Rise of Mana	Music with Kenji Ito, Hiroki Kikuta, and Yoko Shimomura
2014	Final Fantasy Explorers	Music
2015	Kingdom Hearts Union χ	Music with Yoko Shimomura
2015	Dissidia Final Fantasy	Arrangements with Takeharu Ishimoto and Keiji Kawamori
2018	Secret of Mana	Arrangements with several others
2019	Kingdom Hearts III	Music with Yoko Shimomura and Takeharu Ishimoto
2020	Final Fantasy VII Remake	Arrangements with several others
2024	Visions of Mana	Music with Hiroki Kikuta and Ryo Yamazaki

=== Films ===
Year	Title	Notes
2005	Final Fantasy VII Advent Children	Music with Nobuo Uematsu and Keiji Kawamori
2009	Final Fantasy VII Advent Children Complete	Arrangements with Keiji Kawamori

=== Other works ===
Year	Title	Notes
2001	feel/Go dream: Yuna & Tidus	with Masashi Hamauzu and Masayoshi Kikuchi
2003	The Black Mages	
2004	The Black Mages II: The Skies Above	
2008	The Black Mages III: Darkness and Starlight	
