= Music of Final Fantasy IV =

Music from the video game Final Fantasy IV

The music of the video game Final Fantasy IV was composed by regular series composer Nobuo Uematsu. The Final Fantasy IV Original Sound Version, a compilation of almost all of the music in the game, was released by Square Co./NTT Publishing, and subsequently re-released by NTT Publishing. It was released in North America by Tokyopop as Final Fantasy IV Official Soundtrack: Music from Final Fantasy Chronicles, with one additional track. It has since been re-released multiple times with slight changes as part of the Final Fantasy Finest Box and as Final Fantasy IV DS OST. An arranged album entitled Final Fantasy IV Celtic Moon, containing a selection of musical tracks from the game performed in the style of Celtic music by Máire Breatnach, was released by Square and later re-released by NTT Publishing. Additionally, a collection of piano arrangements composed by Nobuo Uematsu and played by Toshiyuki Mori titled Piano Collections Final Fantasy IV was released by NTT Publishing.

The music was overall well received; reviewers have praised the quality of the original composition despite the limitations of the medium, and reacted favorably to the arranged soundtracks. Several tracks, especially "Theme of Love", remain popular today, and have been performed numerous times in orchestral concert series, as well as being published in arranged and compilation albums by Square as well as outside groups.

== Concept and creation ==
Uematsu has noted that the process of composing was excruciating, involving trial and error and requiring the sound staff to spend several nights in sleeping bags at Square Co. headquarters. He blamed much of the problem on the fact that this was his first soundtrack to use the new Super Famicom hardware, as opposed to his previous soundtracks composed for the Famicom. The liner notes for the Final Fantasy IV OSV album were humorously signed as being written at 1:30 AM "in the office, naturally".

In December 1990, as the game's final compositions were nearing completion, ActRaiser (1990) released; the quality of the sound design used in the soundtrack by Yuzo Koshiro was a shock to the sound staff. Uematsu has mentioned the initial impression of the game's soundtrack gave him and a fellow sound programmer goosebumps, with both of them remarking repeatedly that they would "never be able to reach that level". As the team heavily wanted the game's soundtrack to leave a strong impression, the game's sound design was completely reworked at the eleventh hour of development, changing the tones of the PCM sound to give a more orchestral feel.

In June 2007, Square Enix held a casting for a vocalist to sing a version of Final Fantasy IV's "Theme of Love" rearranged by Nobuo Uematsu. Megumi Ida was selected from approximately 800 applicants to perform the song, which was featured on the Japanese Nintendo DS remake of the game, as well as the accompanying soundtrack album.

== Albums ==
=== Final Fantasy IV Original Sound Version ===
Final Fantasy IV Original Sound Version

Soundtrack album by Nobuo Uematsu Junya Nakano (DS version), Kenichiro Fukui (DS version)
- Released: June 14, 1991; November 26, 1994 (re-release); October 1, 2004 (re-release); January 30, 2008 (DS version)
- Length: 58:23; 102:52 (DS version)
- Labels: Square Co./NTT Publishing; NTT Publishing (re-release); Square Enix (DS version)

Final Fantasy IV Original Sound Version is a soundtrack album containing the musical tracks from the game, composed, arranged, produced and performed by Nobuo Uematsu. It spans 44 tracks and covers a duration of 58:25. It was first released on June 14, 1991, by Square Co./NTT Publishing, and subsequently re-released on November 26, 1994, and October 1, 2004, by NTT Publishing. The original release bears the catalog number N23D-001, and the re-release bears the catalog number NTCP-5014. After the release of Final Fantasy IV for the Sony PlayStation as part of Final Fantasy Chronicles, the album was released in North America by Tokyopop on August 21, 2001 as Final Fantasy IV Official Soundtrack: Music from Final Fantasy Chronicles. This is nearly the same release as Final Fantasy IV: Original Sound Version, some track titles were slightly changed, and a 45th track was added, "Theme of Love (Arranged)", which had previously only been released on Piano Collections Final Fantasy IV. This release has the catalog numbers TPCD 0210-2.

The GBA version was again released as part of the Final Fantasy Finest Box by Square Enix on March 28, 2007 under the catalog number FFFB-0001 along with the OSTs of V and VI after the game was ported to the Game Boy Advance. This version included several tracks which were not included in the original album, such as the "Chocobo Forest" theme, the music for the dancing girl, the short intro to "Cry in Sorrow/Sorrow and Loss", and various fanfares.

After the release of Final Fantasy IV for the Nintendo DS, a new version of the Soundtrack arranged by Junya Nakano and Kenichiro Fukui, respectively, was released in Japan in January 2008 as Final Fantasy IV Original Soundtrack. Most of the pieces are the same as on the original album, although they were reproduced for the sound hardware of the DS, with new synthesizer effects. A new version of "Theme of Love" was included, with lyrics sung by Megumi Ida. It was released as a two-disk set with a bonus DVD containing the full motion video included in the re-releases of Final Fantasy IV, and has the catalog numbers SQEX-10105-7. This version of "Theme of Love" was also released as a single, entitled Moonlight -Final Fantasy IV Theme of Love-. The single also includes the DS version of the song, the original track, and a karaoke version of the Megumi Ida rendition. It was released along with a bonus DVD containing a music video for the song on December 5, 2007 with the catalog numbers of BVCR-19727-8 and a duration of 16:21.

Final Fantasy IV OSV sold over 164,000 copies. It was well received; reviewers have praised the quality of the composition despite the limited medium. Soundtrack Central compared it favorably with Uematsu's later works, especially the soundtrack for Final Fantasy VI, and termed it a "great CD". However, the length of several tracks as well as of the album as a whole was criticized, with reviewers finding it "too short" and disapproving of the early fade-out of some tracks. Reviewers found the expanded and remastered version found in the Finest Box to be comparable to the quality of the original album, with some tracks improving in their remake, becoming "deeper" or "sharper" as was appropriate.

A new edition of the soundtrack, Final Fantasy IV Original Soundtrack Remaster Version, was released by Square Enix on July 3, 2013. This version is expanded to two discs, allowing the tracks to play through two loops rather than just one, as well as the addition of a few short pieces that were left off of the original recording. Despite the name, the album features the original Super NES version of the music, rather than a more modern synthesizer sound. The album has the catalog number SQEX-10373~4, and its 57 tracks have a duration of 1:32:40. Joshua Bateman of RPGFan stated that while the remaster edition wasn't strictly necessary, given that Square Enix still sold the original version online, the new edition was still a superior version and an important step in preserving classic video game music.

Track listing

#	Japanese title (Romanization)	English title (literal translation if different)	Length
1.	プレリュード (Pureryūdo)	"The Prelude"	1:13
2.	赤い翼 (Akai tsubasa)	"The Red Wings"	2:06
3.	バロン王国 (Baron Ōkoku)	"Kingdom of Baron"	1:10
4.	愛のテーマ (Ai no Tēma)	"Theme of Love"	1:49
5.	オープニング (Ōpuningu)	"Prologue" ("Opening")	1:10
6.	街のテーマ (Machi no Tēma)	"Welcome to Our Town!" ("Town Theme")	0:49
7.	ファイナルファンタジーIV メインテーマ (Fainaru Fantajī Fō Mein Tēma)	"Main Theme of FINAL FANTASY IV"	1:25
8.	バトル1 (Batoru 1)	"Battle 1"	1:00
9.	勝利のファンファーレ (Shōri no Fanfāre)	"Fanfare" ("Victory Fanfare")	0:25
10.	デブチョコボ登場 (Debu Chokobo Tōjō)	"Enter Fat Chocobo"	0:24
11.	チョコボ (Chokobo)	"Chocobo Chocobo" ("Chocobo")	0:30
12.	ダンジョン (Danjon)	"Into the Darkness" ("Dungeon")	1:21
13.	バトル2 (Batoru 2)	"Battle 2"	1:13
14.	ボムの指輪 (Bomu no Yubiwa)	"Bomb Ring"	0:52
15.	少女リディア (Shōjo Ridia)	"Rydia" ("Little Girl Rydia")	1:01
16.	ダムシアン城 (Damushian jō)	"Damcyan Castle"	1:03
17.	哀しみのテーマ (Kanashimi no Tēma)	"Sorrow and Loss" ("Theme of Sorrow")	1:01
18.	ギルバートのリュート (Girubāto no Ryūto)	"Edward's Harp" ("Gilbert's Lute")	0:54
19.	試練の山 (Shiren no Yama)	"Mt. Ordeals"	1:18
20.	ファブール国 (Fabūru koku)	"Fabul" ("Fabul Country")	1:35
21.	脱出 (Dasshutsu)	"Run!" ("Escape")	0:24
22.	疑惑のテーマ (Giwaku no Tēma)	"Suspicion" ("Theme of Suspicion")	0:37
23.	黒い甲冑ゴルべーザ (Kuroi katchū Gorubēza)	"Golbez, Clad in Darkness" ("Black-armored Golbeza")	1:00
24.	親方シド (Oyakata Shido)	"Hey Cid!" ("Master Cid")	0:55
25.	ミシディア国 (Mishidia koku)	"Mystic Mysidia" ("Misidia Country")	1:19
26.	長い道のり (Nagai Michinori)	"A Long Way to Go"	0:45
27.	パロム・ポロムのテーマ (Paromu, Poromu no Tēma)	"Palom and Porom" ("Palom and Porom's Theme")	0:37
28.	ゴルべーザ四天王とのバトル (Gorubēza Shitennō to no Batoru)	"Battle With the Four Fiends" ("Battle With Golbeza's Four Fiends")	1:39
29.	飛空艇 (Hikūtei)	"The Airship"	0:55
30.	トロイア国 (Toroia koku)	"Troian Beauty" ("Toroia Country")	1:23
31.	サンバ・デ・チョコボ (Sanba de Chokobo)	"Samba de Chocobo!"	0:45
32.	バブイルの塔 (Babuiru no Tō)	"Tower of Bab-il" ("Tower of Babil")	1:31
33.	一方その頃 (Ippō sono koro)	"Somewhere in the World..." ("Meanwhile, At This Time...")	0:33
34.	ドワーフの大地 (Dowāfu no Daichi)	"Land of Dwarves"	1:04
35.	キング・ジォットの城 (Kingu Jotto no Shiro)	"Giott, King of the Dwarves" ("King Giott's Castle")	0:57
36.	踊る人形カルコブリーナ (Odoru Ningyō Karukoburīna)	"Dancing Calbrena" ("Dancing Doll Calcobrena")	0:32
37.	ゾットの塔 (Zotto no Tō)	"Tower of Zot"	1:05
38.	幻獣の街 (Genjū no Machi)	"The Land of Summons" ("Town of Mythical Beasts")	1:14
39.	魔導船 (Madōsen)	"Lunar Whale" ("Magic Ship")	1:08
40.	もう一つの月 (Mō Hitotsu no Tsuki)	"Another Moon"	1:06
41.	月の民 (Tsuki no Tami)	"The Lunarians" ("People of the Moon")	1:16
42.	巨人のダンジョン (Kyojin no Danjon)	"Within the Giant" ("Giant's Dungeon")	1:27
43.	最後の闘い (Saigo no Tatakai)	"The Final Battle"	1:55
44.	エンディング・テーマ (Endingu Tēma)	"Epilogue" ("Ending Theme")	11:37

=== Final Fantasy IV Celtic Moon ===
Final Fantasy IV Celtic Moon

Soundtrack album by Máire Breatnach
- Released: October 28, 1991
- Length: 52:36
- Label: NTT Publishing

Final Fantasy IV Celtic Moon is a selection of musical tracks from the game, arranged and performed in the style of Celtic music by Máire Breatnach. It spans 15 tracks and covers a duration of 52:36. It was first released on October 28, 1991, in Japan, and subsequently re-released on November 26, 1994, and on October 1, 2004, by NTT Publishing. The original release bears the catalog number N30D-006, the first re-release bears the catalog number PSCN-5017, and the most recent re-release has the catalog number NTCP-5017.

The album sold over 26,000 copies. Overall reception of Final Fantasy IV Celtic Moon was also positive, though some reviewers felt that several of the tracks were of lesser quality than the rest of the album. Patrick Gann of RPGFan described it as spectacular, and Matt Brady of Final Fantasy Symphony concurred, saying that the "music quality for this soundtrack was spectacular". Daniel Space of RPGFan, however, found the quality mixed, and said that "some of the pieces do not live up to the new orchestration", although others "were a delight to hear". He also found some of the instruments to be slightly out of tune, which he disliked, though Matt Brady felt it gave the pieces an "ethnic feel".

Track listing
1. "The Prelude" – 3:01; 2. "Prologue..." – 4:04; 3. "Chocobo-Chocobo" – 3:09; 4. "Into the Darkness" – 4:03; 5. "Main Theme of Final Fantasy IV" – 4:41; 6. "Welcome to Our Town" – 3:06; 7. "Theme of Love" – 4:09; 8. "Melody of Lute" – 2:58; 9. "Parom and Polom" – 3:13; 10. "Giotto, the Great King" – 3:14; 11. "Dancing Calcobrena" – 3:11; 12. "Mystic Mysidia" – 3:07; 13. "Illusionary World" – 3:06; 14. "Rydia" – 3:04; 15. "Troian Beauty" – 3:33

=== Piano Collections Final Fantasy IV ===
Piano Collections Final Fantasy IV

Soundtrack album by Nobuo Uematsu
- Released: April 21, 1992
- Length: 57:24
- Label: NTT Publishing

Piano Collections Final Fantasy IV is a collection of Final Fantasy IV music composed by Nobuo Uematsu, arranged by Shiro Satou and played on piano by Toshiyuki Mori. It spans 14 tracks and covers a duration of 57:24. It was first published by NTT Publishing on April 21, 1992, and subsequently re-published on May 23, 2001. The original release bears the catalog number N38D-010, and the reprint bears the catalog number NTCP-1001.

Critical reception for Piano Collections Final Fantasy IV was positive, with reviewers terming the album "fantastic". Damian Thomas of RPGFan said that the album was "a true gem" and said that despite his dislike of piano arrangements, he "truly appreciated" the album. Some reviewers felt that the pieces in the album were "simplistic", especially in comparison to the piano collections for Final Fantasy V and VI, but said that "its simplicity calls for a different feeling, and it is still great" and that despite the lack of complexity, "all of the songs...are extremely nicely done".

Track listing
1. "The Prelude" – 3:37; 2. "Theme of Love" – 3:58; 3. "Prologue..." – 3:08; 4. "Welcome to Our Town!" – 3:07; 5. "Main Theme of Final Fantasy IV" – 3:23; 6. "Chocobo-chocobo" – 2:52; 7. "Into the Darkness" – 4:57; 8. "Rydia" – 3:21; 9. "Melody of Lute" – 3:39; 10. "Golbeza Clad in the Dark" – 3:36; 11. "Troian Beauty" – 3:25; 12. "The Battle" – 6:49; 13. "Epilogue" – 7:20; 14. "Theme of Love (ensemble)" – 4:06

=== Final Fantasy IV Minimum Album ===
Final Fantasy IV Minimum Album is a 6 track Mini CD EP released on September 5, 1991 by NTT Publishing Co. It contains unreleased and arranged tracks from the original soundtrack. The catalog number is N09D-004 and it has a total playing time of 20:25.

Track listing
1. "Prologue... (arranged version)" – 4:56; 2. "Theme of Love (arranged version)" – 4:19; 3. "The Origin (unreleased track)" – 2:01; 4. "Restless Moments (unreleased track)" – 1:46; 5. "The Sea of Silence (unreleased track)" – 2:24; 6. "The Prelude · Crystal Mix" – 4:59

== Legacy ==
The music of Final Fantasy IV has remained popular since its release, especially in Japan. The track "Theme of Love" has even been taught to Japanese school children as part of the music curriculum. Additionally, The Black Mages have arranged two pieces from Final Fantasy IV. These are "Battle with the Four Fiends", an arrangement of "The Dreadful Fight", and "Zeromus", an arrangement of "The Final Battle", both of which can be found on the album The Skies Above, published in 2004. A lyrical version of "Theme of Love", sung by Risa Ohki, appeared on Final Fantasy: Pray, a compilation album produced by Square. Additionally, lyrical versions of "Main Theme of FINAL FANTASY IV" and "Edward's Harp", sung by Risa Ohki and Ikuko Noguchi, appeared on Final Fantasy: Love Will Grow.

Uematsu continues to perform certain pieces in his Dear Friends: Music from Final Fantasy concert series. The music of Final Fantasy IV has also appeared in various official concerts and live albums, such as 20020220 music from FINAL FANTASY, a live recording of an orchestra performing music from the series including several pieces from the game. "Red Wings", "Theme of Love", and "Ending Theme", were played by the Tokyo Philharmonic Orchestra in their first Orchestral Game Concert in 1991 as part of a five concert tour, which was later released as a series of albums. Additionally, "Theme of Love" was performed by the Royal Stockholm Philharmonic Orchestra for the Distant Worlds - Music from Final Fantasy concert tour, as well as by the New Japan Philharmonic Orchestra in the Tour de Japon: Music from Final Fantasy concert series. Independent but officially licensed releases of Final Fantasy IV music have been composed by such groups as Project Majestic Mix, which focuses on arranging video game music. Another popular album release was Echoes of Betrayal, Light of Redemption, an unofficial download-only album release by the remix website OverClocked ReMix on July 19, 2009 containing 54 remixes over 4 "discs". Selections also appear on Japanese remix albums, called dojin music, and on English remixing websites.
