= Music of Final Fantasy VI =

Music from the video game Final Fantasy VI

The music of the video game Final Fantasy VI was composed by regular series composer Nobuo Uematsu. The Final Fantasy VI Original Sound Version, a compilation of all the music in the game, was released in Japan by NTT Publishing in 1994 and re-released by Square Enix in 2004. The album was released by Square Co./NTT Publishing in North America in 1994 under the name Kefka's Domain. Selected tracks from the official soundtrack were later released as part of the Music From FFV and FFVI Video Games album that was included with the release of Final Fantasy Anthology, and two EPs were produced containing character theme tracks entitled Final Fantasy VI Stars Vol. 1 and Vol. 2. A special orchestral arrangement of selected tracks from the game, arranged by Shiro Sagisu and Tsuneyoshi Saito, and performed by the Milan Symphony Orchestra, was released under the title Final Fantasy VI Grand Finale by NTT Publishing in 1994 and 2004, and a collection of piano arrangements, arranged by Shirou Satou and performed by Reiko Nomura, was released under the title Piano Collections Final Fantasy VI by Square/NTT Publishing in 1994 and by NTT Publishing in 2001. Additionally, a single containing unused and remixed tracks from the game was released as Final Fantasy VI Special Tracks by NTT Publishing in 1994.

The music received critical and universal acclaim, with reviewers finding it to be one of the best video game music soundtracks ever composed. Several pieces, particularly "Terra's Theme", "Aria di Mezzo Carattere", and "Dancing Mad", remain popular today, and have been performed numerous times in orchestral concert series such as the Dear Friends: Music from Final Fantasy concert series, the Distant Worlds: Music from Final Fantasy series, and the Orchestral Game Concert series. Music from the soundtrack has also been published in arranged albums and compilations by Square Enix as well as outside groups.

== Albums ==
=== Final Fantasy VI Original Sound Version ===
Final Fantasy VI Original Soundtrack

Soundtrack album by Nobuo Uematsu
- Released: March 25, 1994; July 1, 1994 (Kefka's Domain); October 1, 2004 (reissue)
- Recorded: Sunrise Studios
- Length: 58:00 (disc one); 57:18 (disc two); 72:03 (disc three)
- Label: NTT Publishing; Square (Kefka's Domain); Square Enix (reissue)
- Producer: Nobuo Uematsu

Final Fantasy VI Original Soundtrack is a soundtrack album containing musical tracks from the game, composed and produced by Nobuo Uematsu. The album was originally released through NTT Publishing on March 25, 1994, under the name Final Fantasy VI Original Sound Version and the catalog numbers PSCN-5001~3, and was later re-released by Square Enix on October 1, 2004, with the new name and catalog numbers NTCP-5001~3. The soundtrack spans three discs and has a combined duration of 3:07:21. The soundtrack was also officially released in the United States by Square/NTT Publishing under the name of Kefka's Domain on July 1, 1994. This version of the album is the same as its Japanese counterpart, except for different packaging and small differences in the translation of some track names between the album and newer releases. The album has a catalog number of SQ108.

Ten tracks from the soundtrack, comprising all of the character themes for the required characters of the game, were released in a pair of EPs entitled Final Fantasy VI Stars Vol. 1 and Vol. 2. The CDs were released in 1994 by NTT Publishing with durations of 13:04 and 11:54 and catalog numbers of N09D-023 and NO9D-024, respectively. Additionally, thirteen tracks from the soundtrack were included in a bonus CD titled Music From FFV and FFVI Video Games that shipped with Final Fantasy Anthology on October 5, 1999. The soundtrack was again released as part of the Final Fantasy Finest Box by Square Enix on March 28, 2007, under the catalog numbers FFFB-0004-6 along with the OSTs of IV and V after the game was ported to the Game Boy Advance.

Final Fantasy VI Original Sound Version sold 175,000 copies as of January 2010. The album was very well received by critics. Ben Schweitzer of RPGFan claimed that "almost every track here is truly a very good, or even a great composition". Issac Engelhorn of Soundtrack Central agreed, claiming it to be the best video soundtrack ever, a sentiment Jon Turner and Nick Melton of Soundtrack Central agreed with. Patrick Gann of RPGFan claimed that the "Dancing Mad" track contained some of the "most astounding music ever created on a keyboard" and highly recommended the soundtrack.

A new edition of the soundtrack, Final Fantasy VI Original Soundtrack Remaster Version, was released by Square Enix on September 3, 2013. The album has the catalog number SQEX-10387~9, and its 61 tracks have a duration of 3:07:47. Andrew Barker of RPGFan opined that the differences between the original release and this version were "minor and barely noticeable", but that all of the praises for the original music still held true.

Track listing

Disc one
No.	Title	Kefka's Domain title (if different)	Length
1.	"Omen" (予兆 Yochō)	"Opening Theme"	4:15
2.	"The Mines of Narshe" (炭坑都市ナルシェ Tankō Toshi Narushe)		2:48
3.	"Awakening" (目覚め Mezame)		1:41
4.	"Locke's Theme" (ロックのテーマ Rokku no Tēma)	"Locke"	2:01
5.	"Battle" (戦闘 Sentō)	"Battle Theme"	1:59
6.	"Victory Fanfare" (勝利のファンファーレ Shōri no Fanfāre)	"Fanfare"	0:39
7.	"Edgar & Sabin's Theme" (エドガー、マッシュのテーマ Edogā, Masshu no Tēma)	"Edgar & Sabin"	2:32
8.	"Kefka" (魔導士ケフカ Madōshi Kefuka)		2:43
9.	"Mt. Kolts" (霊峰コルツ Reihō Korutsu)		2:30
10.	"The Returners" (反乱分子 Hanran Bunshi)	"Returners"	2:42
11.	"Shadow's Theme" (シャドウのテーマ Shadō no Tēma)	"Shadow"	1:53
12.	"Troops March On" (帝国の進軍 Teikoku no Shingun)		1:56
13.	"Cyan's Theme" (カイエンのテーマ Kaien no Tēma)	"Cyan"	2:21
14.	"The Unforgiven" (許されざる者 Yurusarezaru Mono)		1:23
15.	"Phantom Forest" (迷いの森 Mayoi no Mori)	"The Phantom Forest"	3:17
16.	"Phantom Train" (魔列車 Ma Ressha)		2:49
17.	"The Veldt" (獣ヶ原 Kemonogahara)	"Wild West"	2:17
18.	"Gau's Theme" (ガウのテーマ Gau no Tēma)	"Gau"	1:50
19.	"The Serpent Trench" (蛇の道 Hebi no Michi)		2:06
20.	"Kids Run Through the City" (街角の子供達 Machikado no Kodomotachi)		2:42
21.	"Under Martial Law" (戒厳令 Kaigenrei)		2:26
22.	"Celes's Theme" (セリスのテーマ Serisu no Tēma)	"Celes"	2:56
23.	"Protect the Espers!" (幻獣を守れ! Genjū o Mamore!)	"Save Them!"	1:57
24.	"The Decisive Battle" (決戦 Kessen)		2:01
25.	"Metamorphosis" (メタモルフォーゼ Metamorufōze)		1:25

Disc two
No.	Title	Kefka's Domain title (if different)	Length
1.	"Terra's Theme" (ティナのテーマ Tina no Tēma)	"Terra"	3:50
2.	"Coin of Fate" (運命のコイン Unmei no Koin)	"Coin Song"	3:14
3.	"Techno de Chocobo" (テクノdeチョコボ Tekuno de Chokobo)		1:35
4.	"Forever Rachel" (永遠に,レイチェル Eien ni, Reicheru)		2:51
5.	"Slam Shuffle" (スラム・シャッフル Suramu Shaffuru)		2:20
6.	"Spinach Rag" (スピナッチ・ラグ Supinacchi Ragu)		2:13
7.	"Overture" (序曲 Jokyoku)		4:46
8.	"Aria di Mezzo Carattere" (アリア Aria)		3:55
9.	"Wedding Waltz ~ Duel" (婚礼のワルツ~決闘 Konrei no Warutsu ~ Kettō)	"The Wedding"	4:00
10.	"Grand Finale" (大団円 Daidan'en)	"Grand Finale?"	3:14
11.	"Setzer's Theme" (セッツァーのテーマ Settsā no Tēma)	"Setzer"	1:55
12.	"Johnny C. Bad" (ジョニー・C・バッド Jonī Shī Baddo)	"Johnny C Bad"	2:54
13.	"The Gestahl Empire" (ガストラ帝国 Gasutora Teikoku)	"The Empire "Gestahl""	3:11
14.	"Magitek Research Facility" (魔導研究所 Madō Kenkyūjo)	"Devil's Lab"	2:32
15.	"The Airship Blackjack" (飛空艇ブラックジャック Hikūtei Burakkujakku)	"Blackjack"	3:04
16.	"What?" (ん?2 N? 2)	"??"	1:07
17.	"Mog's Theme" (モグのテーマ Mogu no Tēma)	"Mog"	1:54
18.	"Strago's Theme" (ストラゴスのテーマ Sutoragosu no Tēma)	"Strago"	2:29
19.	"Relm's Theme" (リルムのテーマ Rirumu no Tēma)	"Relm"	2:54
20.	"Esper World" (幻獣界 Genjū Kai)	"Another World of Beasts"	2:37

Disc three
No.	Title	Kefka's Domain title (if different)	Length
1.	"Floating Continent" (魔大陸 Ma Tairiku)	"New Continent"	2:27
2.	"Catastrophe" (大破壊 Daihakai)		2:15
3.	"Battle to the Death" (死闘 Shitō)	"The Fierce Battle"	2:34
4.	"Rest in Peace" (レスト・イン・ピース Resuto in Pīsu)		0:29
5.	"Dark World" (死界 Shi Kai)		3:03
6.	"From that Day On..." (あの日から... Ano Hi Kara...)	"The Day After"	2:14
7.	"Searching for Friends" (仲間を求めて Nakama o Motomete)		2:56
8.	"Gogo's Theme" (ゴゴのテーマ Gogo no Tēma)	"Gogo"	2:10
9.	"Epitaph" (墓碑名 Bohimei)		2:50
10.	"The Magic House" (からくり屋敷 Karakuri Yashiki)		2:32
11.	"Umaro's Theme" (ウーマロのテーマ Ūmaro no Tēma)	"Umaro"	1:54
12.	"The Fanatics" (狂信集団 Kyōshin Shūdan)	"Fanatics"	1:47
13.	"Kefka's Tower" (邪神の塔 Jashin no Tō)	"Last Dungeon"	2:49
14.	"Dancing Mad" (妖星乱舞 Yōsei Ranbu)		17:35
15.	"Balance Is Restored" (蘇る緑 Yomigaeru Midori)	"Ending Theme"	21:29
16.	"The Prelude" (プレリュード Pureryūdo)		2:21

=== Final Fantasy VI Grand Finale ===
Final Fantasy VI Grand Finale

Soundtrack album by Nobuo Uematsu
- Released: May 25, 1994
- Length: 54:33
- Label: NTT Publishing

Final Fantasy VI Grand Finale is a collection of orchestral arrangements of Final Fantasy VI music composed by Nobuo Uematsu and arranged by Shiro Sagisu and Tsuneyoshi Saito. It was initially released through NTT Publishing on May 25, 1994, under the catalog number PSCN-5004 and subsequently re-released on October 1, 2004, under the catalog number NTCP-5004. The arrangements are performed by the Milan Symphony Orchestra, with vocal performances by Svetla Krasteva. The album spans 11 tracks and covers a duration of 54:33.

Final Fantasy VI Grand Finale sold almost 34,000 copies. It was well received by critics, though not as well as the other albums of music from the game. Daniel Space of RPGFan found that, while he was pleased with the album as a whole, there were issues with the track selections and arrangement quality that detracted from the album. Adam Corn of Soundtrack Central found that, while not without flaws, the album was "interesting and entertaining". Patrick Gann concurred, saying that while there are a few minor arrangement issues, the overall quality of the album is great.

Track listing
No.	Title	Length
1.	"Omen ~ Terra's Theme"	7:57
2.	"Kefka"	3:24
3.	"Phantom Forest"	4:46
4.	"Gau's Theme"	5:18
5.	"Milan de Chocobo"	5:36
6.	"Troops March On"	4:25
7.	"Kids Run Through the City"	3:13
8.	"The Airship Blackjack"	4:16
9.	"Relm's Theme"	5:38
10.	"Phantom Train"	4:01
11.	"Aria di Mezzo Carattere"	5:53

=== Piano Collections Final Fantasy VI ===
Piano Collections Final Fantasy VI

Soundtrack album by Nobuo Uematsu
- Released: June 25, 1994
- Length: 41:23
- Label: NTT Publishing

Piano Collections Final Fantasy VI is an album of music from Final Fantasy VI composed by Nobuo Uematsu, arranged on piano by Shirou Satou and performed by Reiko Nomura. It was first published by Square and NTT Publishing on June 25, 1994, with the catalog number PSCN-5005. It was subsequently republished by NTT Publishing on July 25, 2001, under the catalog number NTCP-1003. The album spans 13 tracks and covers a duration of 41:23. The original release included a hard-cover piano score with all pieces from the album.

The album was well received, with Daniel Space of RPGFan terming it an "amazing CD". Sigmund Shen of Soundtrack Central concurred, calling it "an impressive CD" and "a must-have". Gary King of Soundtrack Central termed it "simply astonishing" and "a CD that really no collector should be without".

Track listing
No.	Title	Length
1.	"Terra's Theme"	3:36
2.	"Gau's Theme"	2:20
3.	"Kefka"	3:39
4.	"Spinach Rag"	2:32
5.	"Strago's Theme"	3:21
6.	"Phantom Forest"	3:23
7.	"Kids Run Through the City"	3:14
8.	"Johnny C. Bad"	3:35
9.	"Phantom Train"	2:36
10.	"The Decisive Battle"	2:32
11.	"Coin of Fate"	4:45
12.	"Celes's Theme"	3:07
13.	"Waltz de Chocobo"	2:36

=== Final Fantasy VI Special Tracks ===
Final Fantasy VI Special Tracks

Soundtrack album by Nobuo Uematsu
- Released: April 25, 1994
- Length: 20:46
- Label: NTT Publishing

Final Fantasy VI Special Tracks is an EP released on April 25, 1994, through NTT Publishing with the catalog number PSDN-6101. It is composed primarily of unused or remixed tracks for Final Fantasy VI, including the exclusive unused vocal track "Approaching Premonition" and a remixed version of the Final Fantasy IV track "Troian Beauty". The CD spans six tracks and covers a duration of 20:46.

Final Fantasy VI Special Tracks, while not as widely reviewed as the other Final Fantasy VI albums, was seen as "very neat" by Patrick Gann, who especially liked the "Techno de Chocobo" track.

Track listing
No.	Title	Length
1.	"Approaching Premonition" (近づく予感 Chikazuku Yokan)	5:22
2.	"Town 2" (街2 Machi 2)	2:38
3.	"Town 3" (街3 Machi 3)	1:14
4.	"Troian Beauty (Remake)" (トロイア国（リメイク） Toroia-koku (Rimeiku))	2:04
5.	"Techno de Chocobo (Another Mix)" (テクノ de チョコボ（アナザー・ミックス） Tekuno do Chokobo (Anazā Mikkusu))	4:08
6.	"Approaching Sentiment (No Vocals)" (近づく予感（ボーカルレス・ヴァージョン） Chikazuku Yokan (Bōkaruresu Vājon))	5:19

== Legacy ==
Uematsu was personally very pleased with the way that the soundtrack for Final Fantasy VI turned out, and has said in interviews that he felt that "with the satisfaction and excitement I felt after finishing that project, I thought I had reached my primary goal, and could quit doing game music with no regrets". He stated in the liner notes for Piano Collections Final Fantasy VI that he intended the music to be emotionally moving, and entreated the listener not to think about the music, but to feel it. He also feels that the title track for Final Fantasy VI was the most challenging track he has ever made. As for Final Fantasy VI Grand Finale, on the other hand, Uematsu has said that he was "not satisfied with this album at all", due to the deviation it took from his original visions for the music due to his lack of personal involvement in the arrangements. Although he did not feel that the album was a poor one, saying that if he said nothing no one would ever know of his dissatisfaction, he felt that it was not what he would have created if he had "defend[ed] the image of each piece".

The Black Mages, a band led by Nobuo Uematsu that arranges music from Final Fantasy games into a rock music style, has arranged four pieces from Final Fantasy VI. These are "The Decisive Battle", "Battle", and "Dancing Mad" from The Black Mages, published in 2003, and "Darkness and Starlight", based on "Opera "Maria and Draco"", from The Black Mages III: Darkness and Starlight, published in 2008. A lyrical version of "Kids Run Through the City", sung by Risa Ohki, appears on Final Fantasy: Pray, a compilation album produced by Square. Additionally, a lyrical version of "Relm's Theme", sung by Risa Ohki and Ikuko Noguchi, appears on Final Fantasy: Love Will Grow.

Uematsu continues to perform certain pieces in his Dear Friends: Music from Final Fantasy concert series. The music of VI has also appeared in various official concerts and live albums, such as 20020220 Music from Final Fantasy, a live recording of an orchestra performing music from the series including "Terra's Theme". In 1994, "Aria di Mezzo Carattere" was played as "Love Oath, Maria and Draco" by the Tokyo Philharmonic Orchestra for the fourth entry in their Orchestral Game Music Concerts series. Additionally, the aria was also performed by the New Japan Philharmonic Orchestra in the Tour de Japon: Music from Final Fantasy concert series. Independent but officially licensed releases of VI music have been composed by such groups as Project Majestic Mix, which focuses on arranging video game music. Selections also appear on Japanese remix albums, called dojin music, and on English remixing websites. In 2012, a Kickstarter campaign for OverClocked ReMix was funded at over $150,000 for the creation of a freely-released multiple-disc album of remixes of the music from the game, led by Andrew Aversa. The album, Balance and Ruin, contains 74 tracks from 74 artists, each with its own unique style.
