= Music of Final Fantasy I and II =

Music from the video games Final Fantasy and Final Fantasy II

The music of the video games Final Fantasy and Final Fantasy II was composed by regular series composer Nobuo Uematsu, who would go on to be the exclusive composer for the next eight Final Fantasy games. Although they were composed separately, music from the two games has only been released together. All Sounds of Final Fantasy I•II, a compilation of almost all of the music in the games, was released by DataM/Polystar in 1989, and subsequently re-released by NTT Publishing in 1994. Symphonic Suite Final Fantasy, an arranged album of music from the two games by Katsuhisa Hattori and his son Takayuki Hattori was released by DataM in 1989, and re-released by NTT Publishing/Polystar in 1994. Final Fantasy & Final Fantasy II Original Soundtrack, another arranged album, this time by Nobuo Uematsu and Tsuyoshi Sekito, was released in 2002 by DigiCube and again in 2004 by Square Enix.

The music was well received by critics; reviewers have praised the quality and power of the original pieces, and reacted favorably to the arranged soundtracks. Several tracks, especially "Opening Theme", "Main Theme" and "Matoya's Cave", remain popular today, and have been performed numerous times in orchestral concert series, as well as having been published in arranged and compilation albums by Square Enix and outside groups.

== Concept and creation ==
When Uematsu was working at a music rental shop in Tokyo, a woman working in the art department for Square, which would later become Square Enix, asked if he would be interested in creating music for some of the titles they were working on, and he agreed. Uematsu considered it a side job, and he did not believe it would become any sort of full-time job. He said it was a way to make some money on the side, while also keeping his part-time job at the music rental shop. Before joining Square, he composed music for television commercials. While working at Square, he met Final Fantasy creator Hironobu Sakaguchi, who asked him if he wanted to compose music for some of his games, which Uematsu agreed to. Sakaguchi gave him a few instructions, such as that the game needed a "battle" music and a "town" music, but left the remainder of the composing to Uematsu, aside from informing him of the specific technical limitations of the Famicom. Several pieces from Final Fantasy I and Final Fantasy II have been reused in different forms throughout the series, especially the "Prelude", "Opening Theme", "Battle", "Victory" and "Chocobo" themes.

== All Sounds of Final Fantasy I•II ==
All Sounds of Final Fantasy I•II

Soundtrack album by Nobuo Uematsu
- Released: February 28, 1989; March 25, 1994 (re-release)
- Length: 62:32
- Label: DataM/Polystar; NTT Publishing (re-release)

All Sounds of Final Fantasy I•II is a soundtrack album of video game music from Final Fantasy I and Final Fantasy II, composed, arranged, and performed by Nobuo Uematsu. It spans 49 tracks and covers a duration of 62:32. It was first released on February 28, 1989, by DataM/Polystar, and subsequently re-released on March 25, 1994, by NTT Publishing. The original release bears the catalog number H25X-20015, and the re-release bears the catalog number PSCR-5251. Tracks 1 and 49 are arranged versions of tracks which appeared in both of the games, tracks 2-21 are from Final Fantasy I, and 22-47 are from Final Fantasy II. Track 48, "Dungeon", was composed for Final Fantasy II, but was not used in the game; it was later used in Final Fantasy VI under the name "The Magic House".

All Sounds of Final Fantasy I•II sold over 12,500 copies and was moderately well received by critics such as Ben Schweitzer of RPGFan, who felt that it had "the same power today that it had 18 years ago", although he also felt that it was much weaker than Uematsu's later works with many of the themes "simplistic and undeveloped". Patrick Gann of RPGFan, on the other hand, praised the album for what he considered to be good music and the rush of nostalgia it brought with it, and was especially pleased with the two arranged tracks. Aaron Lau of Soundtrack Central agreed with the sentiments expressed by Gann, and stated that the arranged tracks alone were worth buying the album for. Romil Balibalita of Soundtrack Central, however, felt that while the soundtrack was good, it was "only worth one or two listens" and recommended it for fans of the original versions of video game music. Nick of Square Enix Music Online said that the album was "an acquired taste" and recommended it primarily to fans of Nobuo Uematsu interested in his earlier work.

Track list
| No. | Title | English translation | Length |
|---|---|---|---|
| 1. | "WELCOME TO F.F.WORLD" | "Welcome to F.F. World" | 6:57 |
| 2. | "プレリュード" (Pureryūdo) | "Prelude" | 0:52 |
| 3. | "オープニング・テーマ" (Ōpuningu Tēma) | "Opening Theme" | 1:25 |
| 4. | "コーネリア城" (Kōneria jō) | "Cornelia Castle" | 0:47 |
| 5. | "メイン・テーマ" (Mein Tēma) | "Main Theme" | 1:02 |
| 6. | "カオスの神殿" (Kaosu no Shinden) | "Temple of Chaos" | 1:00 |
| 7. | "マトーヤの洞窟" (Matōya no Dōkutsu) | "Matoya's Cave" | 1:13 |
| 8. | "街" (Machi) | "Town" | 0:52 |
| 9. | "店" (Mise) | "Shop" | 1:00 |
| 10. | "船" (Fune) | "Ship" | 0:48 |
| 11. | "海底神殿" (Kaitei Shinden) | "Undersea Shrine" | 1:27 |
| 12. | "ダンジョン" (Danjon) | "Dungeon" | 0:56 |
| 13. | "メニュー画面" (Menyū Gamen) | "Menu Screen" | 0:41 |
| 14. | "飛空船" (Hikūsen) | "Airship" | 0:50 |
| 15. | "グルグ火山" (Gurugu Kazan) | "Gurgu Volcano" | 1:12 |
| 16. | "浮遊城" (Fuyū jō) | "Floating Castle" | 1:14 |
| 17. | "戦闘シーン" (Sentō Shīn) | "Battle Scene" | 1:36 |
| 18. | "勝利" (Shōri) | "Victory" | 0:38 |
| 19. | "エンディング・テーマ" (Endingu Tēma) | "Ending Theme" | 1:49 |
| 20. | "デッドミュージック" (Deddo Myūjikku) | "Dead Music" | 0:53 |
| 21. | "セーブミュージック" (Seibu Myūjikku) | "Save Music" | 0:07 |
| 22. | "プレリュード" (Preryūdo) | "Prelude" | 0:46 |
| 23. | "戦闘シーン１" (Sentō Shīn 1) | "Battle Scene 1" | 1:28 |
| 24. | "生き返りの間" (Ikikaeri no ma) | "Time of Revival" | 0:24 |
| 25. | "再会" (Saikai) | "Reunion" | 0:09 |
| 26. | "反乱軍のテーマ" (Hanrangun no Tēma) | "Rebel Army Theme" | 1:15 |
| 27. | "街" (Machi) | "Town" | 1:46 |
| 28. | "メインテーマ" (Mein Tēma) | "Main Theme" | 1:26 |
| 29. | "パンデモニウム城" (Pandemoniumu jō) | "Pandemonium Castle" | 1:04 |
| 30. | "帝国軍のテーマ" (Teikokugun no Tēma) | "Imperial Army Theme" | 1:29 |
| 31. | "チョコボのテーマ" (Chokobo no Tēma) | "Chocobo's Theme" | 0:25 |
| 32. | "魔導士の塔" (Madōushi no Tō) | "Tower of Mages" | 1:25 |
| 33. | "脱出！" (Dasshutsu!) | "Escape!" | 0:20 |
| 34. | "古城" (Kojō) | "Ancient Castle" | 0:51 |
| 35. | "ダンジョン" (Danjon) | "Dungeon" | 1:46 |
| 36. | "皇帝復活" (Kōtei Fukkatsu) | "Emperor's Revival" | 0:27 |
| 37. | "戦闘シーン２" (Sentō Shīn 2) | "Battle Scene 2" | 2:10 |
| 38. | "勝利" (Shōri) | "Victory" | 0:40 |
| 39. | "フィナーレ" (Fināre) | "Finale" | 3:09 |
| 40. | "ワルツ" (Warutsu) | "Waltz" | 0:41 |
| 41. | "王女の誘惑" (Ōjo no Yūwaku) | "Temptation of the Princess" | 0:28 |
| 42. | "デッドミュージック" (Deddo Myūjikku) | "Dead Music" | 0:50 |
| 43. | "ファンファーレ" (Fanfāre) | "Fanfare" | 0:06 |
| 44. | "仲間に加える" (Nakama ni Kuwaeru) | "Joining the Group" | 0:07 |
| 45. | "店" (Mise) | "Shop" | 0:41 |
| 46. | "飛空船" (Hikūsen) | "Airship" | 0:56 |
| 47. | "戦闘シーン３" (Sentō Shīn 3) | "Battle Scene 3" | 1:58 |
| 48. | "ダンジョン" (Danjon) | "Dungeon" | 0:59 |
| 49. | "FAREWELL! F.F. WORLD" | "Farewell! F.F. World" | 7:25 |

== Symphonic Suite Final Fantasy ==
Symphonic Suite Final Fantasy

Soundtrack album by Nobuo Uematsu
- Released: July 25, 1989; March 25, 1994 (re-release)
- Recorded: May 25, 1989
- Venue: Gotanda U-Port Hall
- Length: 39:49
- Label: DataM; NTT Publishing/Polystar (re-release)

Symphonic Suite Final Fantasy is an arranged soundtrack album of music from Final Fantasy I and Final Fantasy II, composed by Nobuo Uematsu, arranged by Katsuhisa Hattori and his son Takayuki Hattori, and performed by the Tokyo Symphony Orchestra with the elder Hattori conducting them personally. It spans 7 tracks and covers a duration of 39:49. It was first released on July 25, 1989, by DataM, and subsequently re-released on March 25, 1994, by NTT Publishing/Polystar. The original release bears the catalog number H28X-10007, and the re-release bears the catalog number PSCR-5253. The music itself is a recording of a concert given by the Tokyo Symphony Orchestra in the Gotanda U-Port Hall in Tokyo.

Symphonic Suite Final Fantasy was very well received by reviewers, with Patrick Gann saying that "the music itself is brilliant" and that "the arrangements are stunning" while remarking not only on the nostalgia inherent in the music but also the combination of the choir and orchestra. Other reviewers such as Chris and Simon from Square Enix Music Online agreed, terming the album "an orchestral masterpiece amassed with some of the best quality and most subtle attempts of arranging available in the Final Fantasy series' discography" and "technically accomplished and on scale that was rarely done at the time of making", respectively. Isaac Engelhorn of Soundtrack Central also enjoyed the album, calling it "wonderful" and his favorite Final Fantasy arranged album, although he did take issue with the length of the album, as well as the sound quality.

Track list
| No. | Title | Original track(s) (game) | Length |
|---|---|---|---|
| 1. | "SCENE I" | "Main Theme" (Final Fantasy II) | 4:19 |
| 2. | "SCENE II" | "Battle Scene 2" (Final Fantasy II) | 5:04 |
| 3. | "SCENE III" | "Opening Theme", "Town", "Matoya's Cave" (Final Fantasy I) | 6:08 |
| 4. | "SCENE IV" | "Finale" (Final Fantasy II) | 5:24 |
| 5. | "SCENE V - Prelude" | "Main Theme", "Temple of Chaos" (Final Fantasy I) | 8:14 |
| 6. | "SCENE VI" | "Gurgu Volcano" (Final Fantasy I), "Dungeon", "Imperial Army Theme" (Final Fantasy II) | 5:05 |
| 7. | "SCENE VII" | "Rebel Army Theme" (Final Fantasy II) | 5:31 |

== Final Fantasy & Final Fantasy II Original Soundtrack ==
Final Fantasy & Final Fantasy II Original Soundtrack

Soundtrack album by Nobuo Uematsu
- Released: October 23, 2002; September 23, 2004 (re-release)
- Length: Disk 1: 55:11; Disk 2: 47:19
- Label: DigiCube; Square Enix (re-release)

Final Fantasy & Final Fantasy II Original Soundtrack is a soundtrack album of video game music from the PlayStation version of the games, Final Fantasy Origins. The soundtrack contains versions of the original game music arranged to take advantage of the PlayStation's sound hardware. The tracks were composed by Nobuo Uematsu and arranged by Nobuo Uematsu and Tsuyoshi Sekito. It spans 65 tracks on two disks and covers a duration of 1:42:30. It was first released on October 23, 2002, by DigiCube, and subsequently re-released on September 23, 2004, by Square Enix. The original release bears the catalog numbers SSCX-10071-2, and the re-release bears the catalog numbers SQEX-10032-3. The first disk contains music from Final Fantasy I by Nobuo Uematsu, while the second disk contains Final Fantasy II by Tsuyoshi Sekito.

Final Fantasy & Final Fantasy II Original Soundtrack sold 3,900 copies and reached #87 on the Japan Oricon charts. It was well received, with Luc of Square Enix Music Online approving of Tsuyoshi Sekito's influence on the arrangements and recommending the album to hardcore fans of Final Fantasy.

Track list

Disc 1
| No. | Title | English translation | Length |
|---|---|---|---|
| 1. | "オープニング・ムービー" (Ōpuningu Mūbī) | "Opening Movie" | 2:02 |
| 2. | "オープニング・ムービー+SE" (Ōpuningu Mūbī + SE) | "Opening Movie + SE" | 2:02 |
| 3. | "オープニング・デモ" (Ōpuningu Demo) | "Opening Demo" | 1:57 |
| 4. | "プレリュード" (Pureryūdo) | "Prelude" | 1:46 |
| 5. | "オープニング・テーマ" (Ōpuningu Tēma) | "Opening Theme" | 1:52 |
| 6. | "コーネリア城" (Cōneria-jō) | "Cornelia Castle" | 2:15 |
| 7. | "メイン・テーマ" (Mein Tēma) | "Main Theme" | 2:38 |
| 8. | "カオスの神殿" (Kaosu no Shinden) | "Temple of Chaos" | 1:46 |
| 9. | "マトーヤの洞窟" (Matōya no Dōkutsu) | "Matoya's Cave" | 2:28 |
| 10. | "街" (Machi) | "Town" | 1:53 |
| 11. | "店" (Mise) | "Shop" | 1:22 |
| 12. | "船" (Fune) | "Ship" | 1:38 |
| 13. | "海底神殿" (Kaitei Shinden) | "Ocean-Floor Temple" | 1:42 |
| 14. | "ダンジョン" (Danjon) | "Dungeon" | 1:30 |
| 15. | "メニュー画面" (Menyū Gamen) | "Menu Screen" | 0:58 |
| 16. | "飛空船" (Hikūsen) | "Airship" | 1:29 |
| 17. | "グルグ火山" (Gurugu Kazan) | "Gurgu Volcano" | 2:36 |
| 18. | "浮遊城" (Fuyū Jō) | "Floating Castle" | 2:28 |
| 19. | "戦闘シーン" (Sentō Shīn) | "Battle Scene" | 1:39 |
| 20. | "勝利" (Shōri) | "Victory" | 0:49 |
| 21. | "デッドミュージック" (Deddo Myūjikku) | "Dead Music" | 0:56 |
| 22. | "セーブミュージック" (Sēbu Myūjikku) | "Save Music" | 0:11 |
| 23. | "教会" (Kyōkai) | "Church" | 1:58 |
| 24. | "廃れた城" (Sutareta Jō) | "Abandoned Castle" | 2:12 |
| 25. | "リュート" (Ryūto) | "Lute" | 0:35 |
| 26. | "橋をかけろ" (Hashi o Kakero) | "Build the Bridge" | 0:42 |
| 27. | "深き場所へ" (Fukaki Basho e) | "To a Deep Place" | 0:17 |
| 28. | "ファンファーレ" (Fanfāre) | "Fanfare" | 0:08 |
| 29. | "クリスタル復活" (Kurisutaru Fukkatsu) | "The Crystal Revives" | 0:16 |
| 30. | "大事なものゲット" (Daiji na Mono Getto) | "Getting Something Important" | 0:09 |
| 31. | "宿屋" (Yadoya) | "Inn" | 1:22 |
| 32. | "中ボスバトル" (Chū-Bosu Batoru) | "Mini-Boss Battle" | 1:34 |
| 33. | "ボスバトルA" (Bosu Batoru A) | "Boss Battle A" | 2:11 |
| 34. | "ボスバトルB" (Bosu Batoru B) | "Boss Battle B" | 2:13 |
| 35. | "ラストバトル" (Rasuto Batoru) | "Last Battle" | 1:51 |
| 36. | "エンディング・テーマ" (Endingu Tēma) | "Ending Theme" | 2:06 |

Disc 2
| No. | Title | English translation | Length |
|---|---|---|---|
| 1. | "オープニング・ムービー" (Ōpuningu Mūbī) | "Opening Movie" | 2:37 |
| 2. | "オープニング・ムービー+SE" (Ōpuningu Mūbī + SE) | "Opening Movie + SE" | 2:39 |
| 3. | "オープニング・テーマ" (Ōpuningu Tēma) | "Opening Theme" | 1:28 |
| 4. | "プレリュード" (Pureryūdo) | "Prelude" | 1:33 |
| 5. | "戦闘シーン１" (Sentō Shīn Ichi) | "Battle Scene 1" | 1:38 |
| 6. | "生き返りの間" (Ikikaeri no Aida) | "During Resurrection" | 1:25 |
| 7. | "再会" (Saikai) | "Reunion" | 0:13 |
| 8. | "反乱軍のテーマ" (Hanrangun no Tēma) | "Rebel Army Theme" | 2:26 |
| 9. | "街" (Machi) | "Town" | 1:56 |
| 10. | "メイン・テーマ" (Mein Tēma) | "Main Theme" | 2:50 |
| 11. | "パンデモニウム城" (Pandemoniumu-jō) | "Pandemonium Castle" | 1:18 |
| 12. | "帝国軍のテーマ" (Teikokugun no Tēma) | "Imperial Army Theme" | 2:55 |
| 13. | "チョコボのテーマ" (Chokobo no Tēma) | "Chocobo Theme" | 0:31 |
| 14. | "魔導士の塔" (Madōshi no Tō) | "Magician's Tower" | 1:34 |
| 15. | "脱出！" (Dasshutsu!) | "Escape!" | 1:15 |
| 16. | "古城" (Kojō) | "Ancient Castle" | 2:44 |
| 17. | "ダンジョン" (Danjon) | "Dungeon" | 1:54 |
| 18. | "皇帝復活" (Kōtei Fukkatsu) | "The Emperor Revives" | 0:49 |
| 19. | "勝利" (Shōri) | "Victory" | 0:46 |
| 20. | "ワルツ" (Warutsu) | "Waltz" | 0:50 |
| 21. | "王女の誘惑" (Ōjo no Yūwaku) | "Temptation of the Princess" | 1:47 |
| 22. | "デッドミュージック" (Deddo Myūjikku) | "Dead Music" | 0:57 |
| 23. | "ファンファーレ" (Fanfāre) | "Fanfare" | 0:09 |
| 24. | "仲間に加える" (Nakama ni Kuwaeru) | "Add a Companion" | 0:09 |
| 25. | "宿屋" (Yadoya) | "Inn" | 0:09 |
| 26. | "戦闘シーンA" (Sentō Shīn Ei) | "Battle Scene A" | 2:25 |
| 27. | "戦闘シーンB" (Sentō Shīn Bī) | "Battle Scene B" | 2:04 |
| 28. | "戦闘シーン２" (Sentō Shīn Ni) | "Battle Scene 2" | 2:20 |
| 29. | "フィナーレ" (Fināre) | "Finale" | 4:10 |

== Legacy ==
The Black Mages, a band led by Nobuo Uematsu that arranges music from Final Fantasy video games into a rock music style, have arranged two pieces from Final Fantasy I. These are "Battle Scene" from the album The Black Mages, published in 2003 and "Matoya's Cave" from the album The Skies Above, published in 2004. They have also arranged a track from Final Fantasy II, "Battle Scene II", in their The Black Mages album. Lyrical versions of "Matoya's Cave" from Final Fantasy I and "Main Theme" from Final Fantasy II, sung by Risa Ohki, appeared on Final Fantasy: Pray, a compilation album produced by Square. Additionally, lyrical versions of "Main Theme" from Final Fantasy I and "Finale" from Final Fantasy II, sung by Risa Ohki and Ikuko Noguchi, appeared on Final Fantasy: Love Will Grow.

The music of Final Fantasy I and II has also appeared in various official concerts and live albums, such as 20020220 music from FINAL FANTASY, a live recording of an orchestra performing music from the series including several pieces from the games. Additionally, several pieces from the games were performed as part of a medley by the Royal Stockholm Philharmonic Orchestra for the Distant Worlds - Music from Final Fantasy concert tour, while a different medley of tunes from the two games were performed by the New Japan Philharmonic Orchestra in the Tour de Japon: Music from Final Fantasy concert series. "Main Theme" from Final Fantasy I was performed at the Press Start - Symphony of Games concert in Tokyo in 2006. A concerto suite of music from Final Fantasy I was performed on July 9, 2011 at the Symphonic Odysseys concert, which commemorated the music of Uematsu. Independent but officially licensed releases of Final Fantasy I and II music have been composed by such groups as Project Majestic Mix, which focuses on arranging video game music. Selections also appear on Japanese remix albums, called dojin music, and on English remixing websites.
