= Music of Final Fantasy V =

Music from the video game Final Fantasy V

The music of the video game Final Fantasy V was composed by regular series composer Nobuo Uematsu. The Final Fantasy V Original Sound Version, a compilation of almost all of the music in the game, was released by Square Co./NTT Publishing, and subsequently re-released by NTT Publishing after the game was brought to North America as part of the Final Fantasy Anthology. An arranged album entitled Final Fantasy V Dear Friends, containing a selection of musical tracks from the game arranged in multiple styles, including live and vocal versions, was released by Square/NTT Publishing and later re-released by NTT Publishing. Additionally, a collection of piano arrangements composed by Nobuo Uematsu, arranged by Shirou Satou and played by Toshiyuki Mori titled Piano Collections Final Fantasy V was released by Square/NTT Publishing, and re-released by NTT Publishing.

The music received mixed reviews; while some reviewers enjoyed the soundtrack and found it to be underrated, others felt it was only of middling quality. Several pieces, especially "Dear Friends", remain popular today, and have been performed numerous times in orchestral concert series such as the Dear Friends: Music from Final Fantasy concert series, named after the Final Fantasy V piece, and the Orchestral Game Concert series. Music from the soundtrack has also been published in arranged and compilation albums by Square as well as outside groups.

== Concept and creation ==
Uematsu had originally calculated that the game would require more than 100 pieces of music, but managed to reduce the number to 56. He has stated that he developed the ideas for the music by first reading through the script and creating the titles for all of the tracks, then composing melodies to match the themes of the story and titles. Uematsu felt that the sound quality of the soundtrack for Final Fantasy V was much better than that of IV. He also claimed that this resulted in the soundtrack release requiring two CDs as opposed to the one CD required for the Final Fantasy IV soundtrack. Uematsu has stated that he would have preferred to keep the soundtrack to one CD, in order to keep the price of the album low.

== Albums ==
=== Final Fantasy V Original Sound Version ===
Final Fantasy V Original Sound Version

Soundtrack album by Nobuo Uematsu
- Released: December 7, 1992; November 26, 1994 (re-release); October 1, 2004 (re-release)
- Recorded: Sunrise Studio
- Length: Disc 1: 60:02; Disc 2: 70:22
- Label: Square/NTT Publishing; NTT Publishing (re-release)
- Producer: Nobuo Uematsu

Final Fantasy V Original Sound Version is a soundtrack album of video game music from Final Fantasy V. The album contains the musical tracks from the game, composed, arranged, produced and performed by Nobuo Uematsu. It spans two discs and 67 tracks, covering a duration of 2:08:30. It was released on December 7, 1992 by Square and NTT Publishing with the catalog number N33D-013~4, and re-released on November 26, 1994 and October 1, 2004 by NTT Publishing with the catalog numbers of PSCN-5015~6 and NTCP-5015~6, respectively.

A single was released in 1992 titled Final Fantasy V: 5+1, consisting of the "Opening Theme", "Main Theme of FINAL FANTASY V", "Harvest", "Dungeon", and "Battle 1" tracks from the soundtrack, as well as the previously unreleased "MATOUYA no doukutsu" ("Matoya's Cave") from Final Fantasy. It was published by NTT Publishing and had a catalog number of NO9D-012 and a length of 14:46. A single named Final Fantasy V Mambo de Chocobo was also released, containing the "Mambo de Chocobo" track from the game, as well as three unused tracks from the game and a compilation mix track. The single was released by NTT Publishing in 1993; it covered a duration of 16:14 and had a catalog number of NO9D-016. Nine tracks from the soundtrack were included in a bonus CD titled Music From FFV and FFVI Video Games that shipped with Final Fantasy Anthology on October 5, 1999, along with tracks from Final Fantasy VI. The soundtrack was again released as part of the Final Fantasy Finest Box by Square Enix on March 28, 2007 under the catalog numbers FFFB-0002-3 along with the OSTs of IV and VI after the game was ported to the Game Boy Advance.

The soundtrack album sold over 135,000 copies. Critical opinion of the soundtrack was mixed. Some reviewers, such as Ben Schweitzer of RPGFan, found it to be of medium quality, saying it "suffer[ed] from occasional compositional problems" and noted that others refer to it as simply "in the middle" of the soundtracks of IV and VI, but was generally positive to the Final Fantasy V's music in his conclusion. Schweitzer praised the "Main Theme of Final Fantasy V" ("Ahead on Our Way") as "a truly stirring piece of music" and "triumphant, hopeful, and yet almost longing at the same time", but stated that "Uematsu's compositional style hits a sort of early plateau here". Other reviewers disagreed, with Jason Strohmaier of Soundtrack Central finding it to be an underrated album, while Jeremy Althouse of Soundtrack Central felt that it was on par with Uematsu's other works.

Track list

Disc 1
No.	Title	English title (literal translation if different)	Length
1.	"ファイナルファンタジーV メインテーマ (Fainaru Fantajī Faibu Mein Tēma)"	Main Theme of Final Fantasy V	2:37
2.	"オープニング (Ōpuningu)"	Opening Theme	4:30
3.	"４つの心 (Yottsu no Kokoro)"	Four Hearts	1:44
4.	"急げ！急げ！！(Isoge! Isoge!!)"	Hurry! Hurry!!	0:44
5.	"レナのテーマ (Rena no Tēma)"	Lenna's Theme	1:58
6.	"ダンジョン (Danjon)"	Dungeon	2:31
7.	"バトル１ (Batoru 1)"	Battle 1	1:14
8.	"勝利のファンファーレ (Shōri no Fanfāre)"	Victory Fanfare	0:44
9.	"レクイエム (Rekuiemu)"	Requiem	0:28
10.	"おれたちゃ海賊 (Oretacha Kaizoku)"	Pirates Ahoy ("We're Pirates")	2:07
11.	"街のテーマ (Machi no Tēma)"	Town Theme	2:19
12.	"おやすみなさい (Oyasuminasai)"	Good Night	0:07
13.	"封印されしもの (Fūinsareshi Mono)"	Sealed Away	1:48
14.	"呪いの地 (Noroi no Chi)"	Cursed Lands	1:55
15.	"幻惑されて (Genwakusarete)"	Deception ("Dazzled")	1:18
16.	"ハーヴェスト (Hāvesuto)"	Harvest	1:46
17.	"銀嶺を行く (Ginrei o Iku)"	To the North Mountain ("Walking the Snow-Capped Mountains")	1:57
18.	"危機一髪！(Kiki Ippatsu!)"	Close Call	1:22
19.	"バトル２ (Batoru 2)"	Battle 2	2:30
20.	"大いなる翼を広げ (Ōinaru Tsubasa o Hiroge)"	Spreading Grand Wings	1:49
21.	"王家の宮殿 (Ōke no Kyūden)"	Royal Palace ("Palace of the Royal Family")	1:40
22.	"火力船 (Karyokusen)"	Fire Ship ("The Fire-Powered Ship")	1:40
23.	"脱出！(Dasshutsu!)"	Run! ("Escape!")	0:51
24.	"離愁 (Rishū)"	Sorrows of Parting	2:37
25.	"古代図書館 (Kodai Toshokan)"	Library of Ancients	2:36
26.	"回想 (Kaisō)"	Reminiscence	1:37
27.	"ムジカ・マキーナ (Mujika Makīna)"	Musica Machina	1:49
28.	"いつの日かきっと (Itsu no Hi ka Kitto)"	The Day Will Come	1:53
29.	"ん？ (N?)"	What? ("Huh?")	0:54
30.	"マンボ・デ・チョコボ (Manbo de Chokobo)"	Mambo de Chocobo	1:12
31.	"はるかなる故郷 (Haruka Naru Furusato)"	Home, Sweet Home ("Far-off Hometown")	2:42
32.	"想い出のオルゴール (Omoide no Orugōru)"	Music Box ("Music Box of Memories")	1:50
33.	"飛空艇 (Hikūtei)"	The Airship	2:03
34.	"覇王エクスデス (Haō Ekusudesu)"	The Evil Lord Exdeath	2:24

Disc 2
No.	Title	English title (literal translation if different)	Length
1.	"エクスデスの城 (Ekusudesu no Shiro)"	Exdeath's Castle	2:23
2.	"暁の戦士 (Akatsuki no Senshi)"	The Dawn Warriors	2:16
3.	"ビッグブリッヂの死闘 (Biggu Burijji no Shitō)"	Clash On the Big Bridge ("Battle to the Death on the Big Bridge")	2:29
4.	"未知なる大地 (Michi Naru Daichi)"	Unknown Lands	2:24
5.	"モーグリのテーマ (Mōguri no Tēma)"	Moogles' Theme	1:29
6.	"暁の城 (Akatsuki no Shiro)"	The Castle of Dawn	2:04
7.	"深い碧の果てに (Fukai Heki no Hate ni)"	Beyond the Deep Blue Sea ("To the End of the Deep Blue")	1:46
8.	"大森林の伝説 (Daishinrin no Densetsu)"	Legend of the Deep Forest	2:37
9.	"タイクーン円舞曲ヘ長調 (Taikūn Enbukyoku e Chōchō)"	Tycoon Waltz ("Tycoon Waltz in F Major")	2:16
10.	"ボコのテーマ (Boko no Tēma)"	Boko's Theme ("Boco's Theme")	1:14
11.	"新しき世界 (Atarashiki Sekai)"	A New World	2:15
12.	"封印の書 (Fūin no Sho)"	Sealed Book	1:49
13.	"古き土の眠り (Furuki Tsuchi no Nemuri)"	Slumber of Ancient Earth	2:29
14.	"虚空への前奏曲 (Kokū e no Zensōkyoku)"	Prelude to the Void	3:57
15.	"光を求めて (Hikari o Motomete)"	In Search of Light ("Searching for the Light")	1:40
16.	"決戦 (Kessen)"	The Decisive Battle	4:26
17.	"最後の闘い (Saigo no Tatakai)"	The Final Battle	4:04
18.	"静寂の彼方 (Seijaku no Kanata)"	The Silent Beyond	5:42
19.	"親愛なる友へ (Shin'ai Naru Tomo e)"	Dear Friends	4:02
20.	"ファイナルファンタジー (Fainaru Fantajī)"	Final Fantasy	3:33
21.	"エンドタイトル (Endo Taitoru)"	Ending Theme ("End Title")	8:16
22.	"プレリュード (Pureryūdo)"	The Prelude	1:46
23.	"ファンファーレ１ (Fanfāre 1)"	Fanfare 1	0:08
24.	"ファンファーレ２ (Fanfāre 2)"	Fanfare 2	0:12
25.	"あたしは踊り子 (Atashi wa Odoriko)"	I'm a Dancer	0:16
26.	"ピアノのおけいこ１ (Piano no Okeiko 1)"	Piano Lesson 1	0:12
27.	"ピアノのおけいこ２ (Piano no Okeiko 2)"	Piano Lesson 2	0:13
28.	"ピアノのおけいこ３ (Piano no Okeiko 3)"	Piano Lesson 3	0:13
29.	"ピアノのおけいこ４ (Piano no Okeiko 4)"	Piano Lesson 4	0:27
30.	"ピアノのおけいこ５ (Piano no Okeiko 5)"	Piano Lesson 5	0:08
31.	"ピアノのおけいこ６ (Piano no Okeiko 6)"	Piano Lesson 6	0:09
32.	"ピアノのおけいこ７ (Piano no Okeiko 7)"	Piano Lesson 7	0:08
33.	"ピアノのおけいこ８ (Piano no Okeiko 8)"	Piano Lesson 8	0:13

=== Final Fantasy V Dear Friends ===
Final Fantasy V Dear Friends

Soundtrack album by Nobuo Uematsu
- Released: March 25, 1993
- Recorded: December 1992
- Length: 55:48
- Label: NTT Publishing

Final Fantasy V Dear Friends is an arranged soundtrack album of Final Fantasy V music containing a selection of musical tracks from the game arranged with live instruments mixed with synth instruments. Several tracks have added vocals performed by Angelit and Ulla Pirttijärvi, in both English and Sámi. The album spans 14 tracks and covers a duration of 55:48. It was first released on March 25, 1993, by Square and NTT Publishing, and subsequently re-released on November 26, 1994, and on October 1, 2004, by NTT Publishing. The original release bears the catalog number N30D-017, the first re-release bears the catalog number PSCN-5018, and the most recent re-release bears the catalog number NTCP-5018.

Reviewers were of mixed opinion about Final Fantasy V Dear Friends, finding it to be of fair quality, though Jason Strohmaier took issue with some of the synthesized instruments and Freddie W. of RPGFan concluded in his review that the album was "a mixed bag of moods, emotions, and ideas that would only appeal to those who loved Final Fantasy V".

Track list
No.	Title	Length
1.	"Ahead On Our Way"	5:36
2.	"Lenna's Theme"	4:42
3.	"Pirates Ahoy"	4:43
4.	"Critter Tripper Fritter!?"	3:05
5.	"Intention of the Earth"	4:28
6.	"My Home, Sweet Home"	3:28
7.	"The Land Unknown"	4:26
8.	"Tenderness In the Air"	3:17
9.	"Waltz Suomi"	2:16
10.	"Fate In Haze"	4:05
11.	"As I Feel, You Feel"	5:08
12.	"Musica Machina"	4:07
13.	"Music Box"	2:30
14.	"Dear Friends"	3:57

=== Piano Collections Final Fantasy V ===
Piano Collections Final Fantasy V

Soundtrack album by Nobuo Uematsu
- Released: June 21, 1993
- Length: 46:31
- Label: NTT Publishing

Piano Collections Final Fantasy V is an album of music from Final Fantasy V composed by Nobuo Uematsu, arranged on piano by Shirou Satou and performed by Toshiyuki Mori. It was first published by Square and NTT Publishing on June 21, 1993 with the catalog number N38D-018. It was subsequently republished by NTT Publishing on September 24, 1994 under the catalog number PSCN-5009 and on June 27, 2001 with the catalog number NTCP-1002. The album spans 13 tracks and covers a duration of 46:31.

Piano Collections Final Fantasy V was well received by reviewers such as Patrick Gann of RPGFan, who found it to be "amazing" and on par with, if not better than, the piano arrangements for the music of the other Final Fantasy games. He also enjoyed the artistic license taken with several of the pieces, finding the album to be the most "abstract" of the Piano Collections series.

Track list
No.	Title	Japanese title	Length
1.	"A Presentiment"	オープニング	4:28
2.	"Tenderness in the Air"	街のテーマ	4:06
3.	"Harvest"	ハーヴェスト	2:30
4.	"Ahead on Our Way"	ファイナルファンタジーV メインテーマ	3:05
5.	"Critter Tripper Fritter!?"	モーグリのテーマ	2:36
6.	"My Home, Sweet Home"	はるかなる故郷	3:42
7.	"Mambo de Chocobo"	マンボdeチョコボ	2:39
8.	"Lenna's Theme"	レナのテーマ	2:49
9.	"Music Box"	思い出のオルゴール	2:58
10.	"Battle with Gilgamesh"	ビッグブリッヂの死闘	3:45
11.	"Waltz Clavier"	タイクーン円舞曲へ長調	2:56
12.	"Dear Friends"	親愛なる友へ	5:06
13.	"The New Origin"	エンドタイトル	5:24

== Legacy ==
The Black Mages, a band that arranges music from Final Fantasy video games into a rock music style, has arranged two pieces from Final Fantasy V. These are "Clash on the Big Bridge" from their self-titled album, published in 2003, and "Neo EXDEATH", an arrangement of "The Final Battle", from Darkness and Starlight, published in 2008. Lyrical versions of "Music Box" and "Dear Friends", sung by Risa Ohki, appeared on Final Fantasy: Pray, a compilation album produced by Square. Additionally, lyrical versions of "Sorrows of Parting" and "Home, Sweet Home", sung by Risa Ohki and Ikuko Noguchi, appeared on Final Fantasy: Love Will Grow.

Uematsu continues to perform certain pieces in his Dear Friends: Music from Final Fantasy concert series, the name of which is taken from the Final Fantasy V piece. The music of V has also appeared in various official concerts and live albums, such as 20020220 music from FINAL FANTASY, a live recording of an orchestra performing music from the series including "Dear Friends". "Opening Theme", "Waltz Clavier", "Town Theme", and "Main Theme of FINAL FANTASY V" were played by the Tokyo Philharmonic Orchestra in their second Orchestral Game Concert in 1992 as part of a five concert tour, which was later released as a series of albums. Additionally, "Main Theme of FINAL FANTASY V" was performed by the New Japan Philharmonic Orchestra in the Tour de Japon: Music from Final Fantasy concert series. The Black Mages performed "Clash on the Big Bridge" at the Extra: Hyper Game Music Event 2007 concert in Tokyo on July 7, 2007. Independent but officially licensed releases of Final Fantasy V music have been composed by such groups as Project Majestic Mix, which focuses on arranging video game music. An arranged version of "Clash on the Big Bridge" appears in the soundtrack of Final Fantasy XII. A group of remixes of music from the game was released as an unofficial download-only album titled The Fabled Warriors: Wind, by the remix website OverClocked ReMix on September 10, 2010 containing 9 remixes; a further four albums were released as part of the Fabled Warriors set. Selections also appear on Japanese remix albums, called dojin music, and on English remixing websites.
