= NTT Publishing =

Japanese record label and publisher

NTT Publishing Co., Ltd. (エヌ・ティ・ティ出版株式会社, Enu Ti Ti Shuppan Kabushiki-gaisha) is a Japanese publishing and record label company, which is an affiliate company of NTT.

The company has published many albums, including:

- Final Fantasy VI Grand Finale
- Piano Collections: Final Fantasy VI
- Final Fantasy IV Celtic Moon
- Final Fantasy: Pray
- Final Fantasy VI Original Sound Version
- Final Fantasy VI Special Tracks
- Final Fantasy 1987-1994
- F. F. Mix
- Final Fantasy: Love Will Grow
- Symphonic Suite Final Fantasy
- Final Fantasy III: Yūkyū no Kaze Densetsu
- Final Fantasy V Dear Friends
- Project Majestic Mix: A Tribute to Nobuo Uematsu
- Phantasmagoria - Nobuo Uematsu
- Chrono Trigger Original Sound Version

They are also the producers of:

- Final Fantasy: Legend of the Crystals

== See also ==
- List of record labels
