= Uppsala University Choir =

Student choir at Uppsala University

Uppsala University Choir is a student choir that performs at many of the main events at Uppsala University. According to the group's webpage, the choir has existed for over 180 years and regularly performs in venues across Sweden, as well as on national radio and television. Music sung by the Uppsala University Choir is also featured on the soundtrack of the 2011 movie, The Flowers of War.
