= Final Fantasy concerts =

Concerts of music from the Final Fantasy video game series

Final Fantasy is a media franchise created by Hironobu Sakaguchi and owned by Square Enix that includes video games, motion pictures, and other merchandise. The original Final Fantasy video game, published in 1987, is a role-playing video game developed by Square, spawning a video game series that became the central focus of the franchise. The primary composer of music for the main series was Nobuo Uematsu, who single-handedly composed the soundtracks for the first nine games, as well as directing the production of many of the soundtrack albums. Music for the spin-off series and main series games beginning with Final Fantasy X was created by a variety of composers including Masashi Hamauzu, Naoshi Mizuta, Hitoshi Sakimoto, and Kumi Tanioka, as well as many others.

Music from the franchise has been performed numerous times in concert tours and other live performances such as the Orchestral Game Music Concerts, Symphonic Game Music Concerts, and the Play! A Video Game Symphony and the Video Games Live concert tours, as well as forming the basis of specific Final Fantasy concerts and concert series. The first such concert was the 20020220 Music from Final Fantasy concert on February 20, 2002, which sparked a six-concert tour in Japan entitled Tour de Japon: Music from Final Fantasy beginning in March 2004. A North American concert series titled Dear Friends - Music From Final Fantasy- followed from 2004 to 2005, and after its conclusion was followed with the More Friends: Music from Final Fantasy concert on May 16, 2005. Voices – Music from Final Fantasy was a concert held in Yokohama, Japan on February 18, 2006, focusing on vocal pieces from the series. The longest running Final Fantasy concert series so far is the Distant Worlds: Music from Final Fantasy concert tour, which began in 2007 and continues to date around the world. The latest officially licensed concerts are Final Symphony and Final Symphony II. All of these concerts have played only music from the main Final Fantasy series, and do not include music from the multiple spin-off series with the exception of Final Fantasy VII Advent Children, the 2005 animated film sequel to Final Fantasy VII.

== 20020220 – Music from Final Fantasy ==
20020220 – Music from Final Fantasy was the first official concert devoted to music from across the Final Fantasy series. A previous concert, Final Fantasy Symphonic Suite, had been performed on May 20, 1989, for a limited audience to create an orchestral version of the soundtracks of Final Fantasy I and II, which have only been released together. The music of 20020220 was arranged for orchestra from the original songs composed by Nobuo Uematsu primarily by Uematsu himself and Shiro Hamaguchi, with "To Zanarkand" and "Yuna's Decision" arranged by Masashi Hamauzu, and was performed by the Tokyo Philharmonic Orchestra on February 20, 2002, at the Tokyo International Forum. The orchestra was conducted by Taizou Takemoto, and the concert was hosted by Masakazu Morita and Mayuko Aoki, the Japanese voice actors for Tidus and Yuna from Final Fantasy X.

The orchestra played 17 songs over a period of almost two hours. The setlist ranged covered songs from the very first Final Fantasy game through Final Fantasy X, the latest game to have been released. Their rendition of "Suteki da Ne" from Final Fantasy X was accompanied by Japanese folk singer Ritsuki Nakano, known as "RIKKI", who sang the track in the original game. Similarly, "Melodies of Life" from Final Fantasy IX was performed by Emiko Shiratori, the original performer for the song in that game's soundtrack. "At Zanarkand" and "Yuna's Decision", both from Final Fantasy X, were solo piano pieces performed by Aki Kuroda, while "Liberi Fatali" and "One-Winged Angel" saw the orchestra combined with a small chorus. Kiyotsugu Amano performed guitar accompaniment for "Dear Friends" (Final Fantasy V) and "Vamo' Alla Flamenco" (Final Fantasy IX).

An album based on a live recording of the concert was released on May 9, 2002, by DigiCube, and was subsequently re-released on July 22, 2004, by Square Enix. The album spans 25 tracks over two discs and covers a duration of 1:47:27, and includes the initial tuning of the orchestra, the speeches given by the MC, and the songs themselves. The album was well received by critics and was termed an "amazing soundtrack" and "probably the best Final Fantasy arranged album ever made" by Robert Bogdanowicz of RPGFan. Liz Maas of RPGFan agreed; although she found there to be a lack of actual innovation overall, she felt the music was "wonderful" and the album as a whole "rather enjoyable". Patrick Dell of Soundtrack Central felt that the album was "wonderful" and "an impressive display", although he greatly disliked the performance of the choir. Dave of Square Enix Music Online was not as impressed by the album, saying that many of the performances were "lacking cohesion and direction", although he felt that overall it was "satisfactory" and "worth repeated listens". Sophia of Square Enix Music Online, on the other hand, felt that it was a "fantastic album" and a "must have".

Setlist

#	Title	Original game
1.	"Liberi Fatali"	Final Fantasy VIII
2.	"Theme of Love"	Final Fantasy IV
3.	"Final Fantasy I-III Medley"	Final Fantasy I ("The Prelude", "Main Theme", "Matoya's Cave"); Final Fantasy II ("Rebel Army Theme", "Chocobo Theme"); Final Fantasy III ("Elia, the Water Maiden")
4.	"Aerith's Theme"	Final Fantasy VII
5.	"Don't Be Afraid"	Final Fantasy VIII
6.	"Tina"	Final Fantasy VI
7.	"Dear Friends"	Final Fantasy V
8.	"Vamo' Alla Flamenco"	Final Fantasy IX
	Intermission	
9.	"At Zanarkand"	Final Fantasy X
10.	"Yuna's Decision"	Final Fantasy X
11.	"Love Grows"	Final Fantasy VIII
12.	"Suteki da ne"	Final Fantasy X
13.	"The Place I'll Return to Someday"	Final Fantasy IX
14.	"Melodies of Life"	Final Fantasy IX
15.	"One Winged Angel"	Final Fantasy VII
	Encore	
16.	"The Man with the Machine Gun"	Final Fantasy VIII
17.	"Final Fantasy Theme"	Final Fantasy series

== Tour de Japon ==
Tour de Japon – Music from Final Fantasy (or Tour de Japon) was a concert tour featuring music from the Final Fantasy video game series that toured Japan from March 12 to April 16, 2004. The tour was built upon the success of the 20020220 Music from Final Fantasy concert, and featured seven concerts in six cities. The series of concerts featured music composed by Nobuo Uematsu and arranged by Shiro Hamaguchi. The orchestras were conducted by Taizō Takemoto, as the orchestra in 20020220 had been. Uematsu guest conducted the encores for each performance; he used a borrowed baton that he had snapped and taped together. Tour de Japon featured fewer non-orchestra performances than 20020220; "Opera "Maria & Draco"" featured the singing of Etsuyo Ota, Tomoaki Watanabe, and Tetsuya Odagawa, while Manami Kiyota and Yuji Hasegawa performed songs from Final Fantasy Song Book: Mahoroba during the intermission. Different orchestras were used in each performance; these were the New Japan Philharmonic Orchestra, Tokyo City Philharmonic Orchestra, Sapporo Symphony Orchestra, Nagoya Philharmonic, Kyushu Symphony, and Osaka Symphoniker Orchestra. One of the performances was recorded and released exclusively on DVD to Nobuo Uematsu Fan Club members.

Setlist

#	Title	Original game
1.	"Opening ~ Bombing Mission"	Final Fantasy VII
2.	"To Zanarkand"	Final Fantasy X
3.	"Ronfaure"	Final Fantasy XI
4.	"Aerith's Theme"	Final Fantasy VII
5.	"The Oath"	Final Fantasy VIII
6.	"You're Not Alone"	Final Fantasy IX
	Intermission	
7.	"Ahead on Our Way"	Final Fantasy V
8.	"Main Theme of Final Fantasy VII"	Final Fantasy VII
9.	"Theme of Love"	Final Fantasy IV
10.	"Final Fantasy I-III Medley 2004"	Final Fantasy I, II, III
11.	"Opera "Maria and Draco""	Final Fantasy VI ("Aria di Mezzo Carattere")
12.	"New Tune from FF7 Advent Children"	Final Fantasy VII Advent Children ("Cloud Smiles")
13.	"Final Fantasy Main Theme"	Final Fantasy series

Tour locations

Date	City	Country	Venue	Orchestra
March 12, 2004	Yokohama	Japan	Minato Mirai Hall	New Japan Philharmonic
March 14, 2004	Tokyo	Japan	Bunkamura Orchard Hall	Tokyo City Philharmonic (noon and evening performances)
March 19, 2004	Sapporo	Japan	Sapporo Concert Hall	Sapporo Symphony Orchestra
April 2, 2004	Nagoya	Japan	Aichi Prefectural Art Theater Concert Hall	Nagoya Philharmonic Symphony Orchestra
April 11, 2004	Fukuoka	Japan	ACROS Fukuoka Symphony Hall	Kyushu Symphony Orchestra
April 16, 2004	Osaka	Japan	Festival Hall, Osaka	Osaka Symphoniker Orchestra

== Dear Friends – Music from Final Fantasy ==
Rinoa Heartilly shown at the Los Angeles Dear Friends concert

Dear Friends – Music from Final Fantasy was a concert tour featuring music from the Final Fantasy video game series that toured the United States from 2004 to 2005. The concert was the first Final Fantasy concert tour for North America and featured record sales and sold-out concerts. The series of concerts featured music composed by Nobuo Uematsu from the later releases of the series. The name of the concert series, in addition to being the name a Final Fantasy V piece that is played at the concerts, was chosen by Uematsu to represent his appreciation for the support given to him by fans of his music and of the Final Fantasy series.

The series was originally conceived as a single concert to be held on May 10, 2004, performed by the Los Angeles Philharmonic Orchestra and conducted by Miguel Harth-Bedoya. The concert was hosted by James Arnold Taylor, the English voice actor for Final Fantasy X's Tidus, and featured large screens hanging above the orchestra playing scenes relevant to the music being performed. Like the concerts before it, Dear Friends featured several groups and instruments in addition to the orchestra, including a guitar for "Dear Friends", castagnettes for "Vamo' Alla Flamenco", and piano for "At Zanarkand" and "Cloud Smiles", which at the time was not named and was only known to be featured in the upcoming Final Fantasy VII Advent Children. The encore piece, "One-Winged Angel", saw the orchestra joined by a full choir, the Los Angeles Master Chorale.

The concert was termed "a complete success" by IGN, who commented that they "walked away impressed with the performance, the presentation, and the timelessness of Uematsu's compositions". The response to the concert was greater than expected, with tickets selling out in three days. After "many fans pleaded for another chance to see the concert", Dear Friends was expanded into a full concert tour the following year, conducted by Arnie Roth. Roth took on the role of conductor for the series after trying to get the show to be performed by his Chicago Pops orchestra, and hearing that other tour locations were hesitant about putting on the concert. He has said that he tried to add to the concerts his personal touch in the areas of "drama and timing". Different orchestras were used in each performance, though the format and setlist remained the same.

Setlist

#	Title	Original game
1.	"Liberi Fatali"	Final Fantasy VIII
2.	"At Zanarkand"	Final Fantasy X
3.	"Terra"	Final Fantasy VI
4.	"Theme of Love"	Final Fantasy IV
5.	"Dear Friends"	Final Fantasy V
6.	"Vamo' Alla Flamenco"	Final Fantasy IX
7.	"Love Grows"	Final Fantasy VIII
	Intermission	
8.	"Aerith's Theme"	Final Fantasy VII
9.	"You are not Alone"	Final Fantasy IX
10.	"Ronfaure"	Final Fantasy XI
11.	"Medley"	Final Fantasy I, II, III
12.	"Cloud Smiles"	Final Fantasy VII Advent Children
13.	"Final Fantasy Theme"	Final Fantasy series
	Encore	
14.	"One-Winged Angel"	Final Fantasy VII

Tour locations

Date	City	Country	Venue	Orchestra
May 11, 2004	Los Angeles	United States	Walt Disney Concert Hall	Los Angeles Philharmonic
February 19, 2005	Rosemont, Illinois	United States	Rosemont Theatre	Chicago Pops Orchestra
March 7, 2005	San Francisco	United States	Nob Hill Masonic Auditorium	Symphony Silicon Valley
May 20, 2005	Hartford, Connecticut	United States	The Bushnell	Local Symphony Orchestra
June 24, 2005	Atlanta	United States	Symphony Hall	Atlanta Symphony Orchestra
June 25, 2005	Atlanta	United States	Symphony Hall	Atlanta Symphony Orchestra
July 1, 2005	Fort Worth, Texas	United States	Bass Symphony Hall	Fort Worth Symphony Orchestra
July 9, 2005	Minneapolis	United States	Orchestra Hall	Minnesota Orchestra
July 14, 2005	San Diego	United States	Embarcadero Marina Park South	San Diego Symphony
July 23, 2005	Detroit	United States	Orchestra Hall	Detroit Symphony Orchestra
July 24, 2005	Detroit	United States	Orchestra Hall	Detroit Symphony Orchestra

== More Friends: Music from Final Fantasy ==
More Friends was a single concert performed while the Dear Friends series was still touring. It was meant to loosely correspond with the one-year anniversary of the first Dear Friends concert, also held in Los Angeles. The concert contained a selection of musical tracks from the games, composed by Nobuo Uematsu, arranged for orchestra by Shiro Hamaguchi, Tsuyoshi Sekito, and Michio Okamiya, and performed by an orchestra conducted by Arnie Roth on May 16, 2005, at the Gibson Amphitheatre in Los Angeles, California. Much like the 20020220 concert, they were accompanied by several different groups. The Black Mages, a band led by Nobuo Uematsu that arranges Final Fantasy music into a rock music style, performed their songs "The Rocking Grounds" and "Maybe I'm a Lion", and joined with the orchestra to perform "One-Winged Angel", while RIKKI sang "Suteki da Ne" as she had in the original game. Emiko Shiratori performed both the Japanese and English versions of "Melodies of Life" in a single piece, opera singers Stephenie Woodling, Chad Berlinghier, and Todd Robinson sang the vocal components of "Opera "Maria & Draco"", and the CSUF University Singers, a local choir, performed as part of "One-Winged Angel".

A recorded album was released on February 15, 2006, by Square Enix with the catalog number SQEX-10065. The album spans 13 tracks and covers a duration of 74:54. The album was well received by critics such as Patrick Gann of RPGFan, who said that "the recording quality is great, almost every song is aimed to please, and rarely do Square Enix fail in this regard". Sophia of Square Enix Music Online concurred, terming it "an album with a little bit of everything" and "a must-have for any Final Fantasy fan".

Setlist

#	Title	Original game
1.	"Opening ~ Bombing Mission"	Final Fantasy VII
2.	"Aerith's Theme"	Final Fantasy VII
3.	"At Zanarkand"	Final Fantasy X
4.	"Don't be Afraid"	Final Fantasy VIII
5.	"Terra's Theme"	Final Fantasy VI
6.	"Swing de Chocobo"	Final Fantasy series
7.	"FINAL FANTASY"	Final Fantasy series
8.	"The Rocking Grounds"	Final Fantasy III
9.	"Maybe I'm a Lion"	Final Fantasy VIII
10.	"Suteki da ne"	Final Fantasy X
11.	"The Place I'll Return to Someday ~ Melodies of Life"	Final Fantasy IX
12.	"Opera "Maria & Draco""	Final Fantasy VI ("Aria di Mezzo Carattere")
	Encore	
13.	"Advent: One-Winged Angel"	Final Fantasy VII Advent Children

== Voices – Music from Final Fantasy ==
Voices – Music from Final Fantasy was a concert held in Yokohama, Japan on February 18, 2006, featuring vocal arrangements of Final Fantasy music. Based on compositions by Nobuo Uematsu, the music was performed by the Prima Vista Philharmonic Orchestra in the Pacifico Yokohama Conference and Convention Center, conducted by Arnie Roth, and sung by various performers. The 16 pieces and two encore songs were interspersed with announcements by Uematsu and Rieko Katayama, the MC. As in previous Final Fantasy concerts, many of the pieces were sung by the original performers from the game. Emiko Shiratori sang "Melodies of Life", Rikki performed "Suteki da ne", Izumi Masuda reprised her role in "Memoro de la Ŝtono", and Angela Aki sang "Kiss me Good-bye", to date the only song from Final Fantasy XII to be performed at a Final Fantasy concert. Angela Aki also sang "Eyes on Me", originally sung by Faye Wong in Final Fantasy VIII. The Black Mages performed their song "Advent: One Winged Angel" along with the orchestra. Other local singers and choirs joined the orchestra for the remaining pieces, with Etsuyo Ota, Tomoaki Watanabe, and Tetsuya Odagawa performing "Opera "Maria and Draco"" as they had in the Tour de Japon two years prior. A DVD of the performance was released on June 21, 2006, containing a recording of the full concert as well as interviews with Nobuo Uematsu, Arnie Roth, and the vocalists.

Setlist

#	Title	Original game
1.	"Prelude"	Final Fantasy series
2.	"Liberi Fatali"	Final Fantasy VIII
3.	"Fisherman's Horizon"	Final Fantasy VIII
4.	"Hymn of the Fayth"	Final Fantasy X
5.	"Suteki da ne"	Final Fantasy X
6.	"Final Fantasy Doo Wop Medley"	Final Fantasy series
7.	"A Place to Call Home ~ Melodies of Life"	Final Fantasy IX
8.	"Final Fantasy"	Final Fantasy series
9.	"Prima Vista Orchestra"	Final Fantasy IX
10.	"The Promised Land"	Final Fantasy VII Advent Children
11.	"Opening Theme Memoro de la Ŝtono"	Final Fantasy XI
12.	"Eyes on Me"	Final Fantasy VIII
13.	"Kiss Me Good-Bye"	Final Fantasy XII
14.	"Opera "Maria & Draco""	Final Fantasy VI ("Aria di Mezzo Carattere")
15.	"Swing de Chocobo"	Final Fantasy series
16.	"Advent: One Winged Angel"	Final Fantasy VII Advent Children
	Encore	
17.	"Advent: One Winged Angel"	Final Fantasy VII Advent Children
18.	"Final Fantasy"	Final Fantasy series

== Distant Worlds ==
=== Distant Worlds: Music from Final Fantasy ===
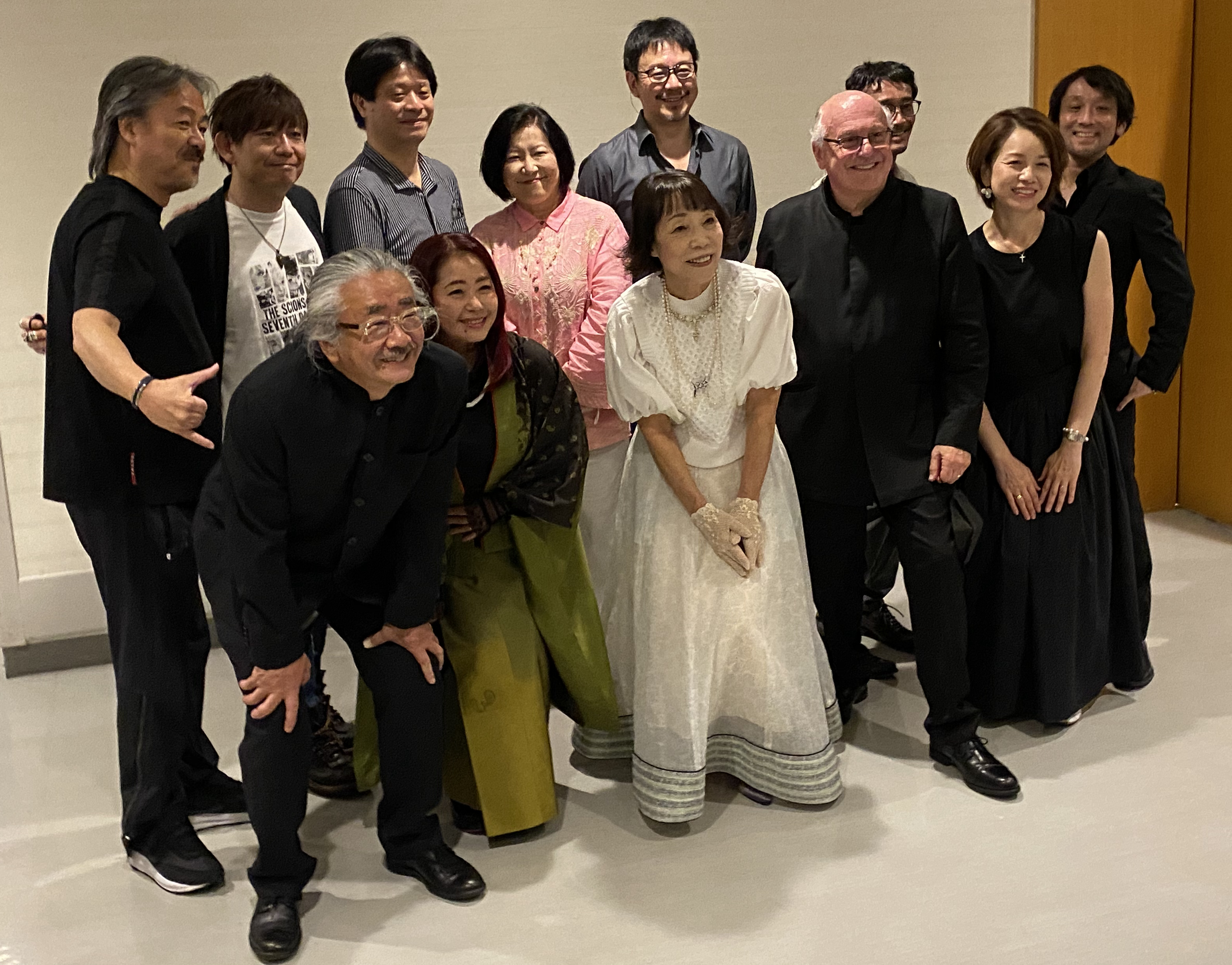
Backstage after a 2022 Distant Worlds 35th Anniversary of Final Fantasy concert in Tokyo, including Nobuo Uematsu, Emiko Shiratori, Rikki, Arnie Roth, Yoko Shimomura, and others

Distant Worlds: Music From Final Fantasy is a concert tour featuring music from the Final Fantasy series that began touring on December 4, 2007, in Stockholm, Sweden and continues to date. Unlike previous tours, it is a worldwide tour. Distant Worlds was created by Arnie Roth and Nobuo Uematsu and is produced by AWR Music Productions. Launched in conjunction with the twentieth anniversary of Final Fantasy, the two-hour-long concerts include music from every single game of the series. Like the Dear Friends concerts, giant video screens display video and art stills in order to accompany the music being played. During the tour, additional songs have been added to the setlist in 2009 and these include "Ronfaure" from Final Fantasy XI, added on April 11, "Man With A Machine Gun" from Final Fantasy VIII, added on June 18, "Main Theme of FFVII", added October 8, and "Dancing Mad" from Final Fantasy VI and "J-E-N-O-V-A" from Final Fantasy VII, added on December 12.

After the Distant Worlds II concert in Stockholm, the additional pieces performed were added to the setlist, and for every concert afterward different songs out of that rotation have been chosen for each performance. "Kiss Me Goodbye" from Final Fantasy XII was played at the June 18, 2010 Detroit show, though it was not officially added to the general setlist. It was played again at the April 1, 2011 concert in New York City, which featured an expanded setlist over two concerts. At that time Square Enix said that the concert series was expected to run for at least three more years. Uematsu said that he preferred for the tour to add arrangements of older pieces from the series, as he felt that they are what fans were more interested in; he and Roth intended to continue to add more arrangements to the setlist. He was hesitant for pieces from Final Fantasy XIII and XIV to be added, as he did not feel that they had been around long enough to build a strong following like the older songs.

Released on December 4, 2007, to coincide with the first concert of the tour, the Distant Worlds: Music from Final Fantasy album features the Royal Stockholm Philharmonic Orchestra and the choir Allmänna Sången, and contains most songs performed at that concert. It was recorded in August at the Stockholm Concert Hall. The CD is sold at all of the concert venues and online at the official website. The album received mixed reviews from critics, with Patrick Gann of RPGFan saying that "the recording quality is decent, the performance is standard, and it's all the classic Final Fantasy you've come to love", but expressing disappointment that the album contained only one new arrangement, with the other songs composed of arrangements originally made for other concerts. Andre of Square Enix Music Online, however, despite also wishing for more original arrangements, felt that the quality was superb and that the album as a whole was "one of life and energy". Chris of Square Enix Music Online also praised the album, finding similar features and flaws.

Program

Original game	Titles
Final Fantasy series	"Main Theme"^{[d]}; "Swing de Chocobo"; "Cinco de Chocobo"; "Chocobo Medley 2010"; "Prelude"; "Victory Theme"; "Medley 2002" (Final Fantasy I-III)^{[a]}; "Medley 2010" (Final Fantasy I-III); "Battle & Victory Theme Medley"^{[e]}; "Battle Medley" (Final Fantasy I-VI)^{[b]}
Final Fantasy III	"Zephyr Memories -Legend of the Eternal Wind-"; "Eternal Wind"
Final Fantasy IV	"Theme of Love"; "Battle with the Four Firnds"; "The Red Wings - Kingdom of Baron"; "Main Theme"
Final Fantasy V	"Dear Friends"; "Clash on the Big Bridge"; "Main Theme"; "A New World"; "Main Theme of Final Fantasy V"; "Home, Sweet Home - Music Box"
Final Fantasy VI	"Dancing Mad"; "Opera 'Maria and Draco'"^{[c]}; "Terra's Theme; "Dark World"; "Searching for Friends"; "Character Theme Medley"; "Balance is Restored"; "Phantom Forest"; "Phantom Forest - Phantom Train - The Veldt"; "Kids Run Through the City Corner"
Final Fantasy VII	"One-Winged Angel"; "Opening – Bombing Mission"; "Aerith's Theme"; "Main Theme of Final Fantasy VII"; "JENOVA"; "Those Who Fight (Let the Battles Begin)"; "Jenova Complete"; "Cosmo Canyon"
Final Fantasy VIII	"Liberi Fatali"; "Fisherman's Horizon"; "Love Grows"; "Don't be Afraid"; "The Man With The Machine Gun"; "Eyes on Me"; "Balamb Garden - Ami"; "The Oath"
Final Fantasy IX	"Vamo' alla Flamenco"; "Prima Vista"; "A Place to Call Home"; "Melodies of Life"; "You're Not Alone"; "Festival of the Fun"; "Roses of May"; "Unrequited Love"
Final Fantasy X	"Zanarkand"; "Suteki da ne"; "Hymn of the Fayth - The Sending"; "Hymn of the Fayth"
Final Fantasy XI	"Memoro de la Stono – Distant Worlds"; "Ronfaure"; "Sword Song - Battle Medley"; "Ragnarok"
Final Fantasy XII	"Kiss Me Goodbye"; "The Dalmasca Estersand"; "Flash of Steel"
Final Fantasy XIII	"The Promise"; "Fang's Theme"; "Saber's Edge"; "March of the Dreadnoughts"; "Fabula Nova Crystallis"; "Blinded by Light"
Final Fantasy XIV	"Twilight over Thanalan"; "Beneath Bloody Borders"; "Primal Judgment"; "Answers"; "Navigator's Glory – The Theme of Limsa Lominsa"; "Torn from the Heavens"; "Dragonsong"; "Heavensward"
Final Fantasy XV	"Apocalypsis Noctis"; "Somnus (instrumental version)"; "Ignis and Raves - Theme Medley"

Subseries/Spin-offs	Titles
Final Fantasy VII Advent Children	"The Promised Land"; "Cloud Smiles"
Final Fantasy VII Remake	"Those Chosen by the Planet - Destiny Comes"; "Jessie's Theme"; "Turks' Theme"; "Stand Up"

notes

a. Final Fantasy I ("The Prelude", "Main Theme", "Matoya's Cave"), Final Fantasy II ("Rebel Army Theme", "Chocobo Theme"), Final Fantasy III ("Elia, the Water Maiden")
b. Final Fantasy I ("Battle"), Final Fantasy II ("Battle Theme 1"), Final Fantasy III ("Battle 1"), Final Fantasy IV ("Battle 1"), Final Fantasy V ("Battle 1"), Final Fantasy VI ("The Decisive Battle"), Final Fantasy Series ("Victory Fanfare"). Nobuo Uematsu and his team arranged this medley specifically for the 2022 Final Fantasy 35th Anniversary Distant Worlds: Music from Final Fantasy Coral concert.
c. There are two versions of "Opera: Maria & Draco". The first version runs for approximately 12 minutes, whereas the second version extends to 14 minutes. The second version includes narration and an extended "duel" portion of the piece.
d. There are two versions of the Main Theme for the Final Fantasy series: the first in Distant Worlds II and the second in Distant Worlds VI. The Distant Worlds VI version enhanced the Distant Worlds II original with the inclusion of choir singing.
e. Final Fantasy V ("Battle at the Big Bridge"), Final Fantasy X ("Fight with Seymour"), Final Fantasy VII ("Those Who Fight/Let the Battles Begin"), Final Fantasy("Victory Theme")

Since 2007, over 200 concerts have been held in the Distant Worlds series, some consisting of multiple performances. Countries visited have included Japan, the United States, Australia, Brazil, Canada, England, France, Germany, Italy, Lebanon, Malaysia, Mexico, Sweden, Singapore, Switzerland, South Korea, Taiwan, Thailand, and the Netherlands.

In 2018, Distant Worlds performed the first video game concert in New York's Carnegie Hall. There have been seven CD and three DVD releases.

=== Distant Worlds II: More Music from Final Fantasy ===
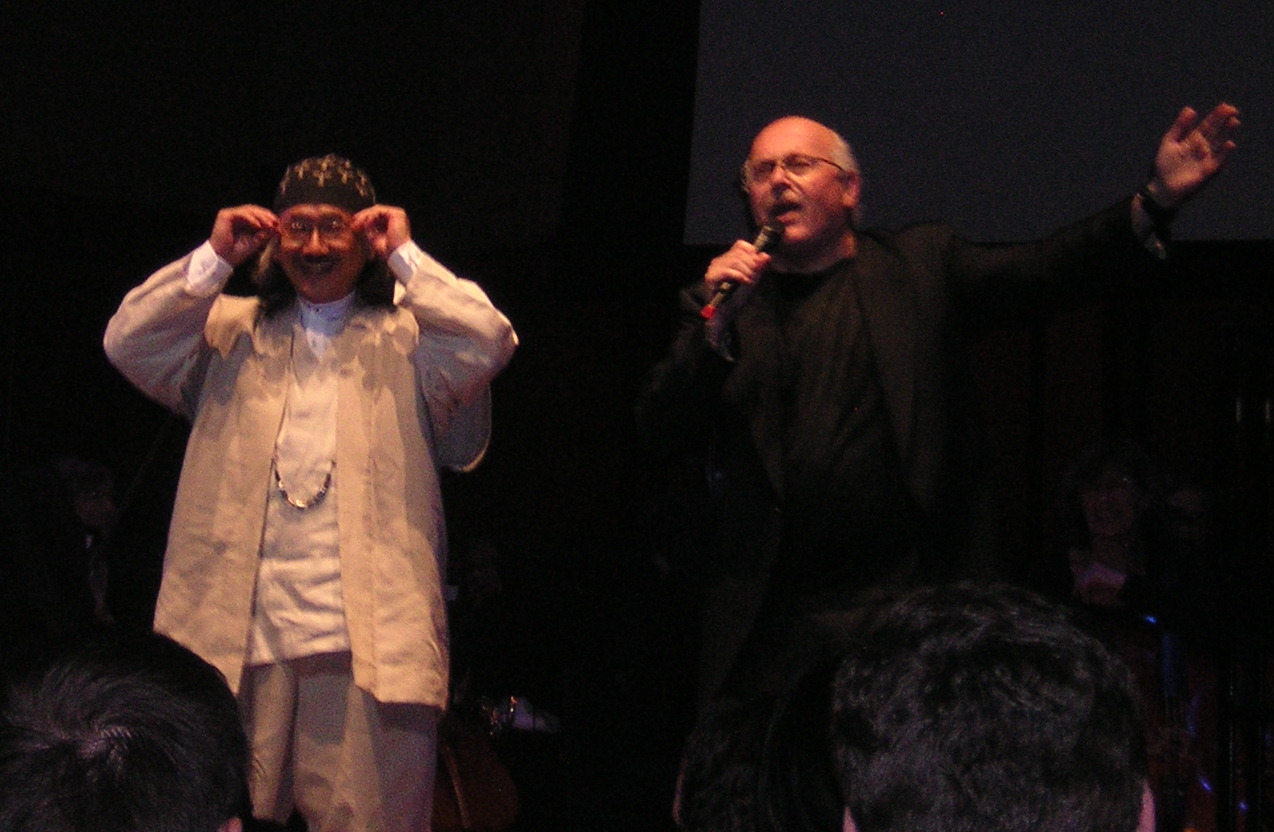
Composer Nobuo Uematsu and Conductor Arnie Roth at a 2009 Seattle Distant Worlds concert

Distant Worlds II: More Music From Final Fantasy was a concert in the Distant Worlds series featuring music from Final Fantasy that was performed on June 12, 2010, in Stockholm, Sweden, just as the first Distant Worlds concert was. Arnie Roth returned to the Royal Stockholm Philharmonic Orchestra with a completely new program presenting more pieces from Final Fantasy. Simultaneously with the concert, a new CD with the same repertoire was released under the name Distant Worlds II: Music From Final Fantasy. The recording was done by the Royal Stockholm Philharmonic Orchestra under the direction of Arnie Roth in January 2010. The name Distant Worlds II only refers to the Stockholm concert; the series itself has continued under the original Distant Worlds name with the new arrangements added to its permanent rotation.

Setlist

#	Title	Original game
1.	"Prelude"	Final Fantasy series
2.	"Liberi Fatali"	Final Fantasy VIII
3.	"Victory Theme"	Final Fantasy series
4.	"To Zanarkand"	Final Fantasy X
5.	"Do not Be Afraid"	Final Fantasy VIII
6.	"Ronfaure"	Final Fantasy XI
7.	"Swing de Chocobo"	Final Fantasy VII
8.	"Main Theme"	Final Fantasy VII
9.	"Prima Vista Orchestra"	Final Fantasy IX
10.	"Dear Friends"	Final Fantasy V
11.	"Vamo' alla Flamenco"	Final Fantasy IX
12.	"J-E-N-O-V-A"	Final Fantasy VII
13.	"Opening"	Final Fantasy VII
14.	"Fisherman's Horizon"	Final Fantasy VIII
15.	"A Place to Call Home/Melodies of Life"	Final Fantasy IX
16.	"The Man with the Machine Gun"	Final Fantasy VIII
17.	"Suteki da ne"	Final Fantasy X
18.	"Dancing Mad"	Final Fantasy VI
19.	"The Promise"	Final Fantasy XIII
20.	"Fang's Theme"	Final Fantasy XIII
21.	"Medley"	Final Fantasy XIV
22.	"Terra's Theme"	Final Fantasy VI
23.	"One Winged Angel"	Final Fantasy VII
24.	"Clash on the Big Bridge"	Final Fantasy V
25.	"Twilight over Thanalan"	Final Fantasy XIV
26.	"Blinded by Light"	Final Fantasy XIII
27.	"Saber's Edge"	Final Fantasy XIII
28.	"March of the Dreadnoughts"	Final Fantasy XIII

=== Distant Worlds: Music from Final Fantasy Returning Home ===
Distant Worlds: Music from Final Fantasy Returning Home was a concert in the Distant Worlds series conducted by Arnie Roth featuring music composed by Nobuo Uematsu and Masashi Hamauzu from the Final Fantasy series. The concert was performed on November 6 and 7, 2010 in Tokyo, Japan, by the Kanagawa Philharmonic Orchestra with guest performances from vocalists Frances Maya and Susan Calloway, among others. The concert premiered several arrangements from Final Fantasy XIII and XIV, which were then added to the general rotation. The entire 2010 Japan concert was recorded live for a DVD and 2-CD set which was later released on January 19, 2011.

Setlist

#	Title	Original game
1.	"One-Winged Angel"	Final Fantasy VII
2.	"Victory Theme"	Final Fantasy
3.	"Don't be Afraid"	Final Fantasy VIII
4.	"FINAL FANTASY I~III Medley 2010"	Final Fantasy I-III
5.	"Love Grows"	Final Fantasy VIII
6.	"Ronfaure"	Final Fantasy XI
7.	"J-E-N-O-V-A"	Final Fantasy VII
8.	"Dear Friends"	Final Fantasy V
9.	"Vamo' alla flamenco"	Final Fantasy IX
10.	"Aerith's Theme"	Final Fantasy VII
11.	"Chocobo Medley 2010"	Final Fantasy Series
12.	"Opening ~ Bombing Mission"	Final Fantasy VII
13.	"Zanarkand"	Final Fantasy X
14.	"Those Who Fight"	Final Fantasy VII
15.	"Dancing Mad"	Final Fantasy VI
16.	"Blinded by Light"	Final Fantasy XIII
17.	"Fang's Theme"	Final Fantasy XIII
18.	"March of the Dreadnoughts"	Final Fantasy XIII
19.	"Fabula Nova Crystallis"	Final Fantasy XIII
20.	"Saber's Edge"	Final Fantasy XIII
21.	"Navigator's Glory ~The Theme of Limsa Lominsa~"	Final Fantasy XIV
22.	"Twilight over Thanalan"	Final Fantasy XIV
23.	"Answers"	Final Fantasy XIV
24.	"Primal Judgement"	Final Fantasy XIV
25.	"The Man with the Machine Gun"	Final Fantasy VIII
26.	"Terra's Theme"	Final Fantasy VI
	Encore	
27.	"Clash on the Big Bridge"	Final Fantasy V

=== A New World ===
Beginning in 2014, Square Enix began touring a new series, A New World, which featured cut-down versions of the arrangements for Distant Worlds, edited by Arnie Roth, and played in smaller venues. The concerts, marketed as more "intimate" versions of the Distant Worlds concerts, feature more solo and duet performances to correspond with their smaller chamber orchestras. Like the main concert series, A New World is an international series, with over 100 performances worldwide. An album of music from the concert was made available as a digital album to purchase on Bandcamp on August 22, 2014.

== Final Symphony ==
Final Symphony is an official concert tour featuring music from Final Fantasy VI, VII, and X, produced and directed by Thomas Böcker. The world premiere took place May 11, 2013 in Wuppertal, Germany where it was performed twice by the Wuppertal Symphony Orchestra at the venue Historische Stadthalle Wuppertal. A performance by the London Symphony Orchestra took place on May 30 in London at the Barbican Centre. It marked the first live performance of video game music by the London Symphony Orchestra, making a historical moment for the Final Fantasy franchise and video game music in general. At Final Symphony in Wuppertal and London, Nobuo Uematsu and Masashi Hamauzu were in attendance. At the performances by the Tokyo Philharmonic Orchestra, both composers talked about their work on the series on stage of the Tokyo Bunka Kaikan concert venue. Final Symphony Tokyo was the first video game music concert ever to be greeted with standing ovations in Japan. Additional performances took place in Denmark, Sweden, Finland, the Netherlands, the United States, New Zealand, China, Austria and Australia. The tour continues to date.

The pieces were arranged by Masashi Hamauzu, one of the composers for Final Fantasy X, along with Jonne Valtonen and Roger Wanamo, and the arranged works are based on compositions by him and Nobuo Uematsu, who acts as a consultant for the concerts. Conducted by Eckehard Stier (Drammatica by Yoko Shimomura; Symphonic Fantasies Tokyo concerts), the concert featured pianists including Benyamin Nuss (Wuppertal and London in 2013), Mischa Cheung (Tampere in 2014; Hong Kong in 2017; Hamburg, Berlin, Munich and Vienna in 2018) and Katharina Treutler (Tokyo, Aarhus and Stockholm in 2014; Amsterdam, San Diego, Baltimore and San Francisco in 2016; Melbourne in 2018).

On October 10, 2014, the Royal Stockholm Philharmonic Orchestra released a video of its critically acclaimed performance of the Final Fantasy VI Symphonic Poem from Final Symphony Stockholm online (available to watch for free and on demand). The Final Symphony album, performed by the London Symphony Orchestra in the presence of composer Nobuo Uematsu at London's Abbey Road Studios, was released early 2015, entering the Classical Album Top 5 of both the Billboard Charts and the Official UK Charts.

Tour locations

Date	City	Country	Venue	Orchestra
May 11, 2013	Wuppertal	Germany	Historische Stadthalle Wuppertal	Wuppertal Symphony Orchestra
May 30, 2013	London	England	Barbican Centre	London Symphony Orchestra
May 4, 2014	Tokyo	Japan	Tokyo Bunka Kaikan	Tokyo Philharmonic Orchestra
May 9, 2014	Aarhus	Denmark	Musikhuset	Aarhus Symphony Orchestra
June 18, 2014	Stockholm	Sweden	Konserthuset	Royal Stockholm Philharmonic Orchestra
September 12, 2014	Tampere	Finland	Tampere Hall	Tampere Philharmonic Orchestra
May 7, 2016	Amsterdam	Netherlands	Concertgebouw Amsterdam	Netherlands Philharmonic Orchestra
July 21, 2016	San Diego	United States	Copley Symphony Hall	San Diego Symphony Orchestra
July 23, 2016	Baltimore	United States	Meyerhoff Symphony Hall	Baltimore Symphony Orchestra
July 27, 2016	San Francisco	United States	Davies Symphony Hall	San Francisco Symphony
October 21-22, 2016	Auckland	New Zealand	ASB Theatre, Aotea Centre	Auckland Philharmonia Orchestra
November 22-23, 2017	Hong Kong	China	HK Cultural Centre Concert Hall	Hong Kong Philharmonic Orchestra
March 2, 2018	Hamburg	Germany	Laeiszhalle Hamburg	Deutsches Filmorchester Babelsberg
March 4, 2018	Berlin	Germany	Berliner Philharmonie	Deutsches Filmorchester Babelsberg
March 14, 2018	Munich	Germany	Philharmonie Munich	Deutsches Filmorchester Babelsberg
March 17, 2018	Vienna	Austria	Konzerthaus Vienna	Bratislava Symphony Orchestra
September 28-29, 2018	Melbourne	Australia	Hamer Hall	Melbourne Symphony Orchestra
April 16, 2023	Birmingham	United Kingdom	Symphony Hall Birmingham	City of Birmingham Symphony Orchestra
June 4, 2023	Newcastle	United Kingdom	Sage Gateshead	Royal Northern Sinfonia
September 20, 2023	Stuttgart	Germany	Theaterhaus Stuttgart	Stuttgarter Philharmoniker
October 14, 2023	Wrocław	Poland	National Forum of Music	NFM Wrocław Philharmonic
April 4–5, 2024	Malmö	Sweden	Malmö Live Konserthus	Malmö Symphony Orchestra
November 8, 2024	Edinburgh	Scotland	Usher Hall	Royal Scottish National Orchestra
November 9, 2024	Glasgow	Scotland	Glasgow Royal Concert Hall	Royal Scottish National Orchestra
January 10-11, 2025	Ottawa	Canada	Southam Hall	NAC Orchestra
February 5, 2025	Vancouver	Canada	Orpheum	Vancouver Symphony Orchestra
April 26, 2025	Des Moines	United States	Des Moines Civic Center	Des Moines Symphony

== Final Symphony II ==
Final Symphony was followed by Final Symphony II, a concert of music from Final Fantasy V, VIII, IX, and XIII. It features long arrangements like the Final Symphony concerts. The majority of the music was originally composed by Nobuo Uematsu, while the Final Fantasy XIII suite was originally composed by Masashi Hamauzu. Produced and directed by Böcker again, Valtonen created the arrangements for the Final Fantasy V section, Wanamo worked on the VIII and IX portions, and Hamauzu arranged his own compositions from XIII with orchestration by Valtonen. A concert was performed at the Barbican Centre in London by the London Symphony Orchestra on September 12, 2015, and later an earlier performance on August 29 in Bonn, Germany by the Beethoven Orchestra Bonn. After the debut performances, the London Symphony Orchestra traveled to Japan to perform the concert there three times: in Osaka on September 27, and twice in Yokohama on October 4, the first time a non-Japanese orchestra ever performed a game concert in the country. Additional performances took place in Finland, Sweden and the Netherlands. The tour continues to date.

Tour locations

Date	City	Country	Venue	Orchestra
August 29, 2015	Bonn	Germany	Beethovenhalle Bonn	Beethoven Orchestra Bonn
September 12, 2015	London	England	Barbican Centre	London Symphony Orchestra
September 27, 2015	Osaka	Japan	Festival Hall Osaka	London Symphony Orchestra
October 4, 2015	Yokohama	Japan	Yokohama Minato Mirai Hall	London Symphony Orchestra
April 1, 2016	Tampere	Finland	Tampere Hall	Tampere Philharmonic Orchestra
June 9, 2016	Stockholm	Sweden	Konserthuset	Royal Stockholm Philharmonic Orchestra
July 5, 2019	Amsterdam	Netherlands	Concertgebouw Amsterdam	Netherlands Philharmonic Orchestra
July 6, 2019	Essen	Germany	Philharmonic Hall Essen	Essen Philharmonic Orchestra
June 2, 2024	Birmingham	United Kingdom	Symphony Hall Birmingham	City of Birmingham Symphony Orchestra
June 9, 2024	Newcastle	United Kingdom	The Glasshouse	Royal Northern Sinfonia
July 6, 2025	Wrocław	Poland	National Forum of Music	NFM Wrocław Philharmonic

== Dreams of Zanarkand ==
A concert devoted solely to music from Final Fantasy X, titled Dreams of Zanarkand, was performed on October 8, 2016, in Cologne, Germany. The arrangements were made by composer Masashi Hamauzu and pianist Benyamin Nuss from the original tracks by Hamauzu and Uematsu. The concert was performed by the WDR Orchestra, with piano by Nuss, and featured narration of events from the game by comedian and game tester Maxi Gstettenbauer. Dreams of Zanarkand was the first European game music concert dedicated to a single game.

== Eorzean Symphony ==
A series of concerts of music from Final Fantasy XIV began in 2017, titled Eorzean Symphony. The series began in September with a three-night set of concerts in Tokyo performed by the Tokyo Philharmonic Orchestra, led by conductor Hirofumi Kurita. It continued in June 2018 with another concert in Los Angeles and in then again in August in Dortmund, Germany. An album was released on December 20, 2017, containing music from the Tokyo concerts; a Blu-ray release contains sixteen tracks as well as video from the concerts, while a CD release contains eight tracks. The album sold over 13,100 copies.

== Final Fantasy VII Remake Orchestra World Tour ==
Final Fantasy VII Remake Orchestra World Tour is a concert tour beginning in 2021 containing music from Final Fantasy VII Remake. The pieces are new orchestral arrangements of music from the game, itself containing new versions of songs from the original Final Fantasy VII. Initially announced as beginning in June 2020, with listed concerts through February 2021, the tour was postponed due to the COVID-19 pandemic until April 2021, with over 20 concerts planned for Asia, North America, and Europe. One concert, a Tokyo performance on February 13, 2021, was replaced with a livestreamed concert by the Tokyo Philharmonic Orchestra. An accompanying album of music Final Fantasy VII Remake Orchestral Arrangement Album was originally planned for October 2020, and similarly delayed.

== Other concerts ==
In addition to concerts specifically devoted to the Final Fantasy series, music from the games has been performed at many other concerts and concert series. Music from the series was played in the first four concerts of the Tokyo Philharmonic Orchestra's Orchestral Game Music Concerts series from 1991 to 1994, and each concert has been released on an album. Outside Japan, Final Fantasy music was played for the first time at the Symphonic Game Music Concert series, a series of annual German video game music concerts starting in August 2003. It has also been played live by the Australian Eminence Symphony Orchestra since October 2003, an independent symphony orchestra specializing in classical music from video games and in the Video Games Live concert tour from 2005 to date as well as the Play! A Video Game Symphony world tour from 2006 onwards, for which Nobuo Uematsu composed the opening fanfare that accompanies each performance. The music made up one fourth of the Symphonic Fantasies concerts in September 2009 and in 2012 which were produced by the creators of the Symphonic Game Music Concert series and conducted by Arnie Roth; music from the Chrono series, the Kingdom Hearts series, and the Mana series made up the rest of the concert.
