= List of Final Fantasy compilation albums =

Compilation albums of music from the Final Fantasy video game series

Final Fantasy is a media franchise created by Hironobu Sakaguchi and owned by Square Enix that includes video games, motion pictures, and other merchandise. There have been a number of compilation albums of Final Fantasy music produced by Square Enix, as well as several albums produced by outside groups, both officially and unofficially licensed. These albums include music directly from the games, as well as arrangements covering a variety of styles, such as orchestral, piano, vocal, and techno. Square Enix produced the first album, Final Fantasy 1987–1994, in 1994. Since then, over 40 albums have been produced, both by Square Enix and, beginning with the 2000 The Best of Final Fantasy 1994–1999: A Musical Tribute, outside groups.

== Albums ==
Albums
Title	Games	Date	Length	Label	Notes	Ref.
Final Fantasy: Pray	Final Fantasy I—VI	June 25, 1994	47:02	NTT Publishing	Album of vocal arrangements in several languages from the first six games. Re-released in 2004. Sold over 18,600 copies.	
Final Fantasy 1987–1994	Final Fantasy I—VI	November 26, 1994	1:03:10	NTT Publishing	A greatest hits album of the first six games, along with unreleased tracks and four vocal arrangements. December 10, 1994 is the release of the non -limited Edition. Released in North America by Tokyopop in 2001 as Final Fantasy N Generation: Official Best Collection. Sold over 14,400 copies.	
F. F. Mix	Final Fantasy IV, V, VI	November 26, 1994	58:10	NTT Publishing	Album of remix arrangements; includes material from the prior singles Final Fantasy IV Minimum Album, Final Fantasy V: 5+1, and Final Fantasy V Mambo de Chocobo. Re-released in 2004.	
Final Fantasy: Love Will Grow	Final Fantasy I—VI	November 25, 1995	42:48	NTT Publishing	Album of vocal arrangements, sung by Risa Ohki and Ikuko Noguchi in multiple languages. Re-released in 2004.	
Music from FFV and FFVI Video Games	Final Fantasy V, VI	October 5, 1999	57:27	Square	Promotional CD which was included with the release of the Final Fantasy Anthology collection in North America.	
The Best of Final Fantasy 1994–1999: A Musical Tribute	Final Fantasy VI, VII, VIII	September 26, 2000	37:12	Big Ear Music	Tribute album of music arranged by Sherman F. Heinig and performed by the Hollywood Symphony Orchestra and the Electric Sound Ensemble. Re-released as Music Inspired By Final Fantasy in 2001 by WB Music Corp with an additional track.	
Potion: Relaxin' with Final Fantasy	Final Fantasy III—VIII	February 21, 2001	1:06:22	DigiCube	Contains a selection of tracks from prior Final Fantasy piano and arrangement albums, with one new arrangement. Reached No. 42 on the Japan Oricon music charts. Sold over 6,500 copies. Re-released by Square Enix in 2006.	
Final Fantasy S Generation: Official Best Collection	Final Fantasy VII, VIII, IX	October 23, 2001	1:06:50	Tokyopop	Contains a selection of tracks from prior Final Fantasy arrangement albums. Released exclusively in North America.	
Potion 2: Relaxin' with Final Fantasy	Final Fantasy I—IX	December 19, 2001	1:01:23	DigiCube	Contains a selection of tracks from prior Final Fantasy piano and arrangement albums, with one new arrangement.	
20020220 – Music from Final Fantasy	Final Fantasy I—X	May 9, 2002	1:48:03	DigiCube	Live recording of an orchestral concert of arranged music from the series, performed by the Tokyo Philharmonic Orchestra on February 20, 2002, at the Tokyo International Forum. Reached #54 on the Japanese Oricon music charts. Sold over 7,600 copies. Re-released by Square Enix in 2004.	
Project Majestic Mix: A Tribute to Nobuo Uematsu	Final Fantasy I—IV, VI—X	May 9, 2002	1:14:24	KFSS studios	Licensed fanmade album of remixes made and sold by KFSS studios. A Gold Edition with a second CD released only to pre-orderers on June 22, 2002, with a length of 2:20:41.	
The Black Mages	Final Fantasy I, II, V—VIII, X	February 19, 2003	51:29	DigiCube	Eponymous first album by The Black Mages, a band created by Square Enix composers. Sold over 23,500 copies. Re-released by Square Enix in 2004.	
Final Fantasy Song Book: Mahoroba	Final Fantasy III, V, VII, VIII, IX	March 10, 2004	50:18	Universal Music Group	Album of Japanese vocal arrangements. Contains a hidden instrumental track. Sold over 5,300 copies.	
The Black Mages II: The Skies Above	Final Fantasy I, III, IV, VIII, IX, X	December 22, 2004	50:56	Universal Music Group	Second album by The Black Mages, a band created by Square Enix composers. Sold over 11,800 copies.	
More Friends: Music from Final Fantasy	Final Fantasy I—X, Final Fantasy VII: Advent Children	February 15, 2006	1:14:54	Square Enix	Live recording of an orchestral concert of arranged music from the series, performed by an orchestra on May 16, 2005, at the Gibson Amphitheatre in Universal City, California, along with guest artists such as The Black Mages.	
Distant Worlds: Music from Final Fantasy	Final Fantasy I—XI	December 4, 2007	1:14:22	AWR Records	Orchestral concert of arranged music from the series, recorded by the Royal Stockholm Philharmonic Orchestra in August 2007 prior to the initial concert of the Distant Worlds concert series in the Stockholm Concert Hall on December 4 the same year. Sold over 2,400 copies in Japan.	
Final Fantasy Finest Box	Final Fantasy IV Advance, V Advance,VI Advance	March 28, 2007	6:30:28	Square Enix	Promotional box set containing the soundtracks from the Game Boy Advance ports of Final Fantasy IV, V, and VI, with two CDs per soundtrack. The Final Fantasy IV section contains tracks not present in the Final Fantasy IV Advance soundtrack album.	
The Black Mages III: Darkness and Starlight	Final Fantasy III, V, VI—IX, XI	March 19, 2008	1:00:40	Dog Ear Records	Third and final album by The Black Mages, a band created by Square Enix composers.	
Final Fantasy Remix	Final Fantasy II, III, V—XI	August 6, 2008	55:29	Square Enix	Album of dance club remixes by Ante, a DJ group composed by Ian Hartley and Matt Baggiani.	
Guitar Solo Final Fantasy	Final Fantasy I—XII	September 20, 2008	50:22	KMP Music Publishing	Album of guitar solo arrangements by Yuji Sekiguchi, packaged with Guitar Solo Final Fantasy Official Best Collection, a book of guitar sheet music.	
Those Who Distorted	Final Fantasy V, VI, VII	March 25, 2009	19:46	Dog Ear Records	Mini-album of three Final Fantasy arrangements as well as three arrangements of classic rock songs performed by Cellythm, a cello quartet.	
Distant Worlds II: More Music from Final Fantasy	Final Fantasy I—XI	June 1, 2010	1:02:38	AWR Records	Orchestral concert of arranged music from the series, recorded by the Royal Stockholm Philharmonic Orchestra in January 2010 prior to the Distant Worlds II concert in the Stockholm Concert Hall on June 12 the same year, a special event in the Distant Worlds concert series.	
Guitar Solo Final Fantasy Vol.2	Final Fantasy I—XII	January 18, 2011	56:55	KMP Music Publishing	Album of guitar solo arrangements by Yuji Sekiguchi, packaged with Guitar Solo Final Fantasy Official Best Collection Vol. 2, a book of guitar sheet music.	
Piano Opera Final Fantasy I/II/III	Final Fantasy I, II, III	February 29, 2012	49:12	Square Enix	Album of piano arrangements of the first three games in the series, arranged and performed by Hiroyuki Nakayama.	
Piano Opera Final Fantasy IV/V/VI	Final Fantasy IV, V, VI	May 16, 2012	48:57	Square Enix	Album of piano arrangements of three games in the series, arranged and performed by Hiroyuki Nakayama.	
Guitar Solo Final Fantasy Vol.3	Final Fantasy I—XIII	July 20, 2012	55:33	KMP Music Publishing	Album of guitar solo arrangements by Yuji Sekiguchi, packaged with Guitar Solo Final Fantasy Official Best Collection Vol. 2, a book of guitar sheet music.	
Final Fantasy Tribute ~Thanks~	Final Fantasy I—XIII	December 5, 2012	2:17:50	Square Enix	Album of remixes of music from the series by various artists.	
Final Fantasy Orchestral Album	Final Fantasy I—XIV	December 26, 2012	2:12:29	Square Enix	Album of orchestral arranged music from the series, released on blu-ray and vinyl record. Sold over 3,000 copies in Japan.	
Distant Worlds: Music from Final Fantasy The Celebration	Final Fantasy I—XIV	June 26, 2013	1:59:38	AWR Records	Blu-ray recording of orchestral concert of arranged music from the series, recorded by the Distant Worlds Philharmonic Orchestra and Chorus in December 2012 at the Tokyo International Forum. Sold over 2,400 copies in Japan.	
Piano Opera Final Fantasy VII/VIII/IX	Final Fantasy VII, VIII, IX	April 23, 2014	43:18	Square Enix	Album of piano arrangements of three games in the series, arranged and performed by Hiroyuki Nakayama.	
A New World: Intimate Music from Final Fantasy	Final Fantasy I—XIII	August 22, 2014	1:08:21	Square Enix	Recording of orchestral concert of arranged music from the series made at premier of the A New World concert series in London on February 15, 2014.	
Final Symphony - music from Final Fantasy VI, VII and X	Final Fantasy VI, VII, X	February 23, 2015	01:34:30	X5Music	Arranged music from the Final Symphony orchestral world tour, recorded by the London Symphony Orchestra in December 2014 at the Abbey Road Studios in London. Entering Classical Album Top 5 of both Billboard Charts and Official UK Charts.	
Bra-Bra Final Fantasy Brass de Bravo	Final Fantasy I—X	March 4, 2015	52:37	Square Enix	Brass band arragments of music from the series, recorded by the Siena Wind Orchestra.	
Distant Worlds III: More Music from Final Fantasy	Final Fantasy I—XIV	March 6, 2015	1:04:31	AWR Records	Orchestral concert of arranged music from the series, recorded by the Distant Worlds Philharmonic Orchestra and Chorus in November 2014 at the Dvorak Hall of the Rudolfinum in Prague and AWR Music Studio in Chicago.	
Final Fantasy Piano Reductions	Final Fantasy VII—X	March 17, 2015	1:26:25	Joypad Records	Licensed album of piano arrangements of Final Fantasy pieces by TPR.	
Distant Worlds: Music from Final Fantasy: The Journey of 100	Final Fantasy I—XIV	August 19, 2015	1:43:21	AWR Records	Blu-ray recording of an orchestral concert of arranged music from the series, recorded by the Distant Worlds Philharmonic Orchestra and Chorus. Sold over 1,400 copies in Japan.	
Bra-Bra Final Fantasy Brass de Bravo 2	Final Fantasy I—X	March 23, 2016	44:39	Square Enix	Brass band arragments of music from the series, recorded by the Siena Wind Orchestra.	
Bra-Bra Final Fantasy Brass de Bravo 3	Final Fantasy I—X	March 15, 2017	49:29	Square Enix	Brass band arragments of music from the series, recorded by the Siena Wind Orchestra.	
Distant Worlds IV: More Music from Final Fantasy	Final Fantasy I—XV	June 30, 2017	57:11	AWR Records	Orchestral concert of arranged music from the series, recorded by the Distant Worlds Philharmonic Orchestra and Chorus in March 2017 at the Dvorak Hall of the Rudolfinum in Prague and AWR Music Studio in Chicago.	
Bra-Bra Final Fantasy Brass de Bravo 2017	Final Fantasy I—IX	September 13, 2017		Square Enix	Blu-ray release of brass band concert of arrangements of music from the series, recorded by the Siena Wind Orchestra on May 14, 2017, at the Tokyo Bunka Kaikan.	
Square Enix Jazz ~Final Fantasy~	Final Fantasy I—XIII	November 22, 2017	1:04:11	Square Enix	Jazz arrangements of music from the series.	
Final Fantasy 30th Anniversary Tracks 1987-2017	Final Fantasy I—XV	January 24, 2018	3:51:09	Square Enix	Assortment of tracks from the series.	
Final Fantasy I•II•III Original Soundtrack Revival Disc	Final Fantasy I—III	August 15, 2018		Square Enix	Combined Blu-ray release of original soundtracks to the first three games of the series.	
A New World: Intimate Music from Final Fantasy – Volume 2	Final Fantasy I—XIII	May 7, 2019	56:14	Square Enix	Recording of orchestral concert of arranged music from the series made at a Prague A New World concert.	
Distant Worlds V: More Music from Final Fantasy	Final Fantasy V—XV	May 9, 2019	59:29	AWR Records	Orchestral concert of arranged music from the series, recorded by the Distant Worlds Philharmonic Orchestra and Chorus in March 2019 at the Dvorak Hall of the Rudolfinum in Prague and AWR Music Studio in Chicago.	
Final Fantasy The Preludes since 1987	Final Fantasy I—XI, XIV, Final Fantasy Record Keeper, Theatrhythm Final Fantasy, Chocobo's Mysterious Dungeon	September 12, 2019		Square Enix	Prelude tracks from games in the series	
Heroes and Villains - Select Tracks from the Final Fantasy Series First/Second/Third/Fourth	Final Fantasy V—XV	December 2021–March 2022		Square Enix	Character tracks from the series	
Chocobo & Friends 1 - Select Tracks from the Final Fantasy Series Compi Vinyl	Final Fantasy I—XV	May 25, 2022		Square Enix	Chocobo tracks from the series	
Chocobo & Friends 2 - Select Tracks from the Final Fantasy Series Compi Vinyl	Final Fantasy I—XV	May 25, 2022		Square Enix	Chocobo tracks from the series	
Final Fantasy Series 35th Anniversary Orchestral Compilation Vinyl	Final Fantasy I—XV	August 31, 2022		Square Enix	Orchestral arrangements	
Final Fantasy Series 35th Anniversary Distant Worlds: music from Final Fantasy Coral	Final Fantasy I—XV	August 31, 2022		Square Enix	Distant Worlds concert recording	
Electronica Tunes -Final Fantasy Series-	Final Fantasy I—XIII	September 28, 2022		Square Enix	Electronica arrangements	
Modulation - Final Fantasy Arrangement Album	Final Fantasy I—X	November 9, 2022		Square Enix	Arrangements in the audio style of the original tracks	
Final Fantasy Series Acoustic Arrangements	Final Fantasy I—XV	February 22, 2023		Square Enix	Acoustic arrangements	
Distant Worlds VI: More Music from Final Fantasy	Final Fantasy—XI, Final Fantasy VII Remake	September 1, 2023	1:11:04	AWR Records	Orchestral concert of arranged music from the series, recorded by the Distant Worlds Philharmonic Orchestra and Chorus in October 2022 at the Dvorak Hall of the Rudolfinum in Prague and AWR Music Studio in Chicago.	
Crystalline Resonance - Final Fantasy Piano Collection	Final Fantasy VII, VIII, X, XII, XIII, XIV, XVI	January 15, 2025	45:12	Square Enix	Piano versions of songs from Final Fantasy VII onwards	

== See also ==
- List of Final Fantasy media
