= Gotanda U-Port Hall =

Coordinates: 35.6224°N 139.7219°E

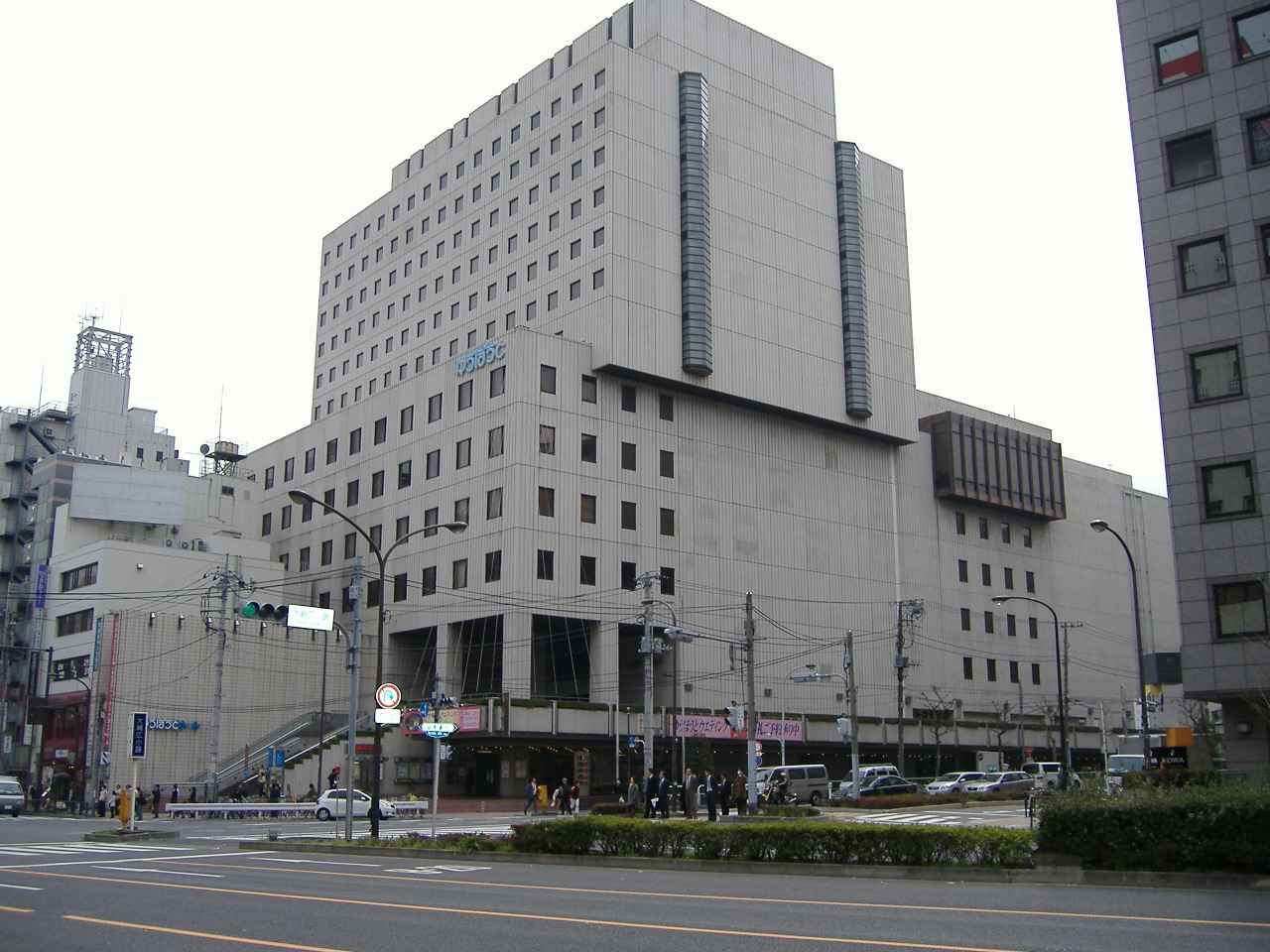
Gotanda U-Port Hall

Gotanda U-Port Hall (ゆうぽうと) was a multi-purpose event venue located in Nishigotanda, Tokyo, Japan. It hosted artists such as Judas Priest, Iron Maiden, Jewel, Stone Temple Pilots, Cheap Trick and Cyndi Lauper. The hall opened in 1982 and closed in 2015.
