= Risa Ohki =

Japanese singer

Risa Ohki (大木 理紗, Ōki Risa) is a Japanese vocalist, most famously featured on Final Fantasy: Pray and Final Fantasy: Love Will Grow albums.

== Career ==
She sings in at least five languages: Japanese (her primary language), English, French, Brazilian Portuguese, and Italian (on Genso Suikoden Vocal album "La passione commuove la Storia").

She also sang an image song for Sailor Uranus from Sailor Moon, which was called "Initial U". However, Ohki was not the voice actress for the character, and she was instead filling in for Megumi Ogata. There are conflicting reports as to why Ogata did not record the song, ranging from her being busy with her role as Shinji Ikari in Neon Genesis Evangelion, to her refusing to record the song outright due to being displeased with the lyrics, though the real reason remains unconfirmed—nevertheless, Ogata released an original song titled "風になる" (Kaze ni Naru, Becoming the Wind) on her album MO after "Initial U" released, which is seen as her own version of the song, but is unaffiliated with Sailor Moon.

She sang as part of a six-member backing choir for the song "At the Gala" in the Japanese dub of My Little Pony: Friendship Is Magic, and voiced the mother of Whale in the Japanese dub of Magic Adventures of Mumfie.
