= New Japan Philharmonic =

Symphony orchestra based in Tokyo, Japan

New Japan Philharmonic 新日本フィルハーモニー交響楽団
- Orchestra
- Founded: 1972
- Location: Tokyo, Japan
- Concert hall: Sumida Triphony Hall

The New Japan Philharmonic (新日本フィルハーモニー交響楽団, Shin Nihon Firuhāmonī Kōkyōgakudan) is a symphony orchestra based in Tokyo, Japan.

== History ==
It was founded in 1972 with Seiji Ozawa as honorary conductor laureate. The Philharmonic's primary concert venue is the Sumida Triphony Hall. From 2003 to 2013 its music director was Christian Arming. Toshiyuki Kamioka has been the music director since 2016.

Since 1997, the orchestra has had a relationship with the Mie Prefecture Cultural Center which established a New Japan Philharmonic Orchestra Regional Base, providing a number of services, including yearly performances, guidance to members of the Mie Junior Orchestra and a performance clinic for amateur musicians living, working, and studying in the prefecture.

== Performances ==
Their video game performances include songs for the Super Smash Bros. Melee orchestral arrangement soundtrack Smashing...Live!, Resident Evil's music in Resident Evil Orchestra, orchestral arrangements by Kaoru Wada for the Kingdom Hearts Original Soundtrack, the music of Go Shiina from Tales of Legendia, and the first stop, Yokohama, on Final Fantasy's Tour de Japon. On May 6, 2009, the 5th Anniversary Monster Hunter Orchestral Concert took place at the Tokyo Metropolitan Theatre in Ikebukuro, Tokyo.

The orchestra is also known for their film soundtrack productions, notably Spirited Away and Howl's Moving Castle, both soundtracks composed, arranged, conducted and performed by Joe Hisaishi; and a number of works for Neon Genesis Evangelion, composed, arranged and conducted by Shirō Sagisu. The orchestra performed the film score for an English-language animated film, The Brave Little Toaster, composed and conducted by David Newman.

The orchestra has done live performances with various musicians, notably Yngwie Malmsteen and his Concerto Suite in E♭ Minor.
