= Tokyo Philharmonic Orchestra =

Japanese orchestra originally founded in Nagoya and currently based in Tokyo

Tokyo Philharmonic Orchestra 東京フィルハーモニー交響楽団
- Orchestra
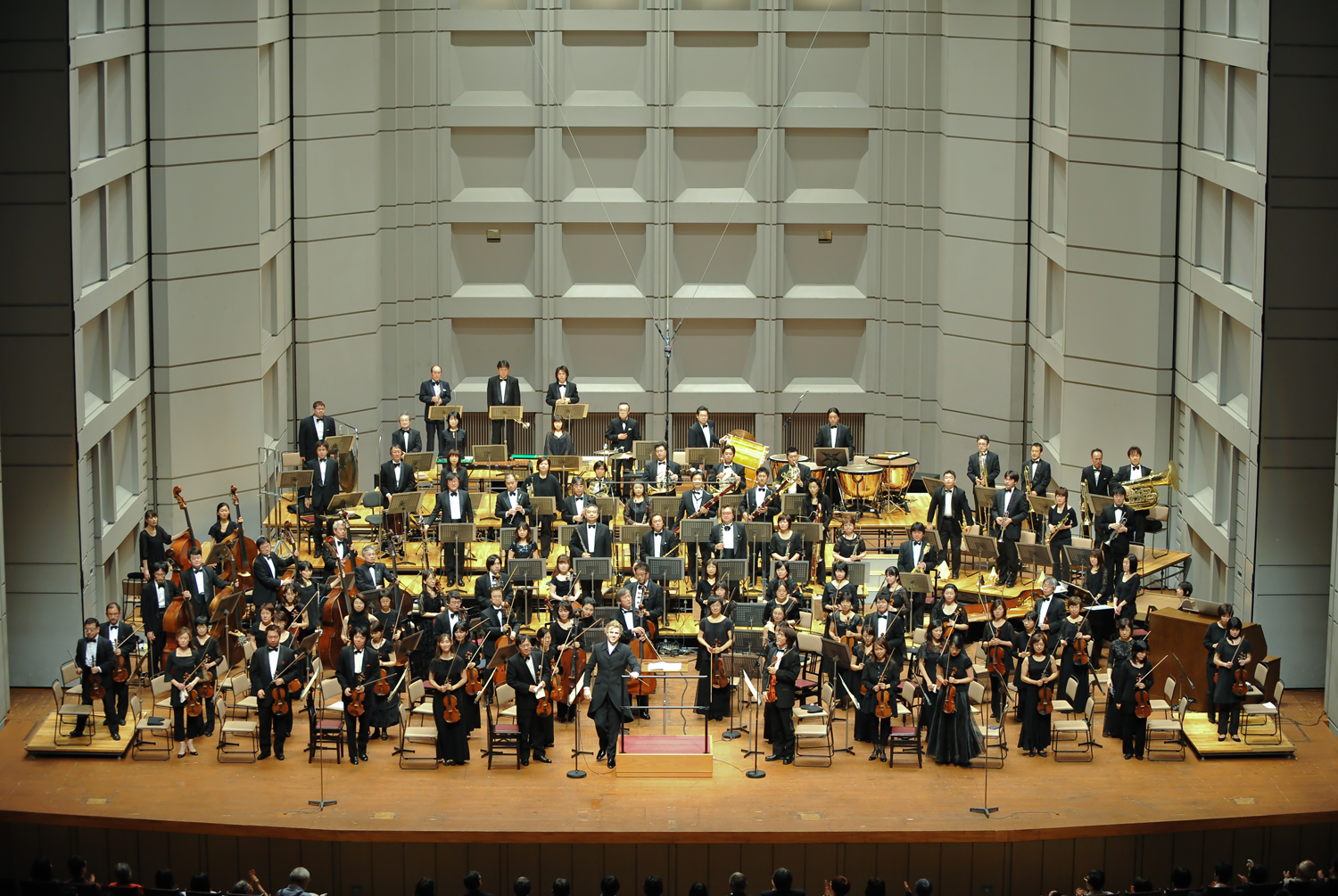
- Founded: 1911
- Website: www.tpo.or.jp

The Tokyo Philharmonic Orchestra (東京フィルハーモニー交響楽団, Tōkyō firuhāmonī kōkyō gakudan) is recognized as the oldest symphony orchestra in Japan. It was founded in 1911 and debuted at the original Matsuzakaya store in Nagoya as the Itō Textiles Shop Youth Band (いとう呉服店少年音楽隊, Itō gofukuten shōnen ongakutai). It relocated to Tokyo in 1938. As of 2024, it has 166 members.

The orchestra plays frequently at Tokyo Opera City in Shinjuku; Orchard Hall, part of the Bunkamura (文化村) shopping and entertainment complex in Shibuya; and Suntory Hall in Akasaka, Tokyo.

== Conductors ==
- Chief Conductor: Andrea Battistoni
- Honorary Music Director: Myung-Whun Chung
- Conductors Laureate: Tadaaki Otaka, Kazushi Ono & Dan Ettinger
- Special Guest Conductor: Mikhail Pletnev
- Resident Conductor: Kazumasa Watanabe
- Associate Conductor: Min Chung
- Permanent Honorary Member and Conductor Laureate: Norio Ohga
