= Music of the Final Fantasy series =

Music from Japanese media franchise

Final Fantasy is a media franchise created by Hironobu Sakaguchi and owned by Square Enix that includes video games, motion pictures, and other merchandise. The series began in 1987 as an eponymous role-playing video game developed by Square, spawning a video game series that became the central focus of the franchise. The music of the Final Fantasy series refers to the soundtracks of the Final Fantasy series of video games, as well as the surrounding medley of soundtrack, arranged, and compilation albums. The series' music ranges from very light background music to emotionally intense interweavings of character and situation leitmotifs.

The franchise includes a main series of numbered games as well as several spin-off series such as Crystal Chronicles and the Final Fantasy Tactics series. The primary composer of music for the main series was Nobuo Uematsu, who single-handedly composed the soundtracks for the first nine games, as well as directing the production of many of the albums. Music for the spin-off series and main series games beginning with Final Fantasy X was created by a variety of composers including Masashi Hamauzu, Naoshi Mizuta, Hitoshi Sakimoto, Kumi Tanioka, and Yoko Shimomura.

The majority of Final Fantasy games, including all of the main series games, have received a soundtrack album release. Many have also inspired orchestral, vocal, or piano arrangement albums. In addition to the regular albums, a number of compilation albums of tracks from multiple games have been produced both by Square Enix and outside groups. Music from the original soundtracks of the games has been arranged as sheet music for the piano and published by DOREMI Music Publishing, while sheet music from the piano albums have been published by Yamaha Music Media. The franchise's music has been performed numerous times in concert tours and other live performances such as the Orchestral Game Music Concerts, Symphonic Game Music Concerts, and the Play! A Video Game Symphony and Video Games Live concert tours, as well as forming the basis of specific Final Fantasy concerts such as the Dear Friends and Distant Worlds concert tours.

== Themes ==
Although each game in the Final Fantasy series offers a variety of music, there are some frequently reused themes. Most of the games open with a piece called "Prelude", which is based on a short piece by Bach that has evolved from a simple, two-voice, arpeggiated theme in the early games to a complex melodic arrangement in recent installments. It has been described as being "as recognizable in gaming circles as the Super Mario Bros. theme or Sonic the Hedgehog's title screen pop". Battle victories in the first 10 installments of the series were accompanied by a victory fanfare; this theme has also become one of the most recognized pieces of music in the series. Chocobos and moogles, two mascots for the series, each have their own themes. The basic theme for chocobos is rearranged in a different musical style for each installment, and usually has a title ending in "de Chocobo", while moogles have a theme entitled "Moogle's Theme", which first appeared in Final Fantasy V. The chocobo inspired the spin-off Chocobo series, and many of the pieces from the soundtracks of that series are stylistically based on the main chocobo theme. A piece called "Prologue" or "Final Fantasy", originally featured in the first game, has appeared in some form in every game in the main series, with the exceptions of II, X, and XIII, originally appearing in the prologue of the games. It sometimes appears as a full arrangement and surfaces other times as a theme played during the finale track. Although leitmotifs are often used in the more character-driven installments, theme music is typically reserved for main characters and recurring plot elements.

== History ==
Release timeline
1987	Final Fantasy
1988	Final Fantasy II
1989
1990	Final Fantasy III
1991	Final Fantasy IV
1992	Final Fantasy V
1993
1994	Final Fantasy VI
1995
1996
1997	Final Fantasy VII
1998
1999	Final Fantasy VIII
2000	Final Fantasy IX
2001	Final Fantasy X
2002	Final Fantasy XI
2003
2004
2005
2006	Final Fantasy XII
2007
2008
2009	Final Fantasy XIII
2010	Final Fantasy XIV
2011
2012
2013
2014
2015
2016	Final Fantasy XV
2017
2018
2019
2020
2021
2022
2023	Final Fantasy XVI

=== Main series ===
==== 1987–2000: Uematsu era ====
When Nobuo Uematsu was working at a music rental shop in Tokyo, a woman working in the art department for Square, which would later become Square Enix, approached him about creating music for some of their titles in development, and he agreed. Uematsu considered it a side job and was skeptical it would become any sort of full-time position. He said it was a way to make some money on the side, while also keeping his part-time job at the music rental shop. Before joining Square, he composed music for television commercials. The first score he produced for Square was the soundtrack for the role-playing video game Cruise Chaser Blassty. While working at Square, he met Final Fantasy creator Hironobu Sakaguchi, who asked him if he wanted to compose music for some of his games, which Uematsu agreed to. Sakaguchi gave him a few instructions for the soundtrack of Final Fantasy, Uematsu's 16th score, such as the need for "battle" and "town" music, but left the remainder of the composing to Uematsu, aside from informing him of the specific technical limitations of the Famicom system. The game was released in 1987.

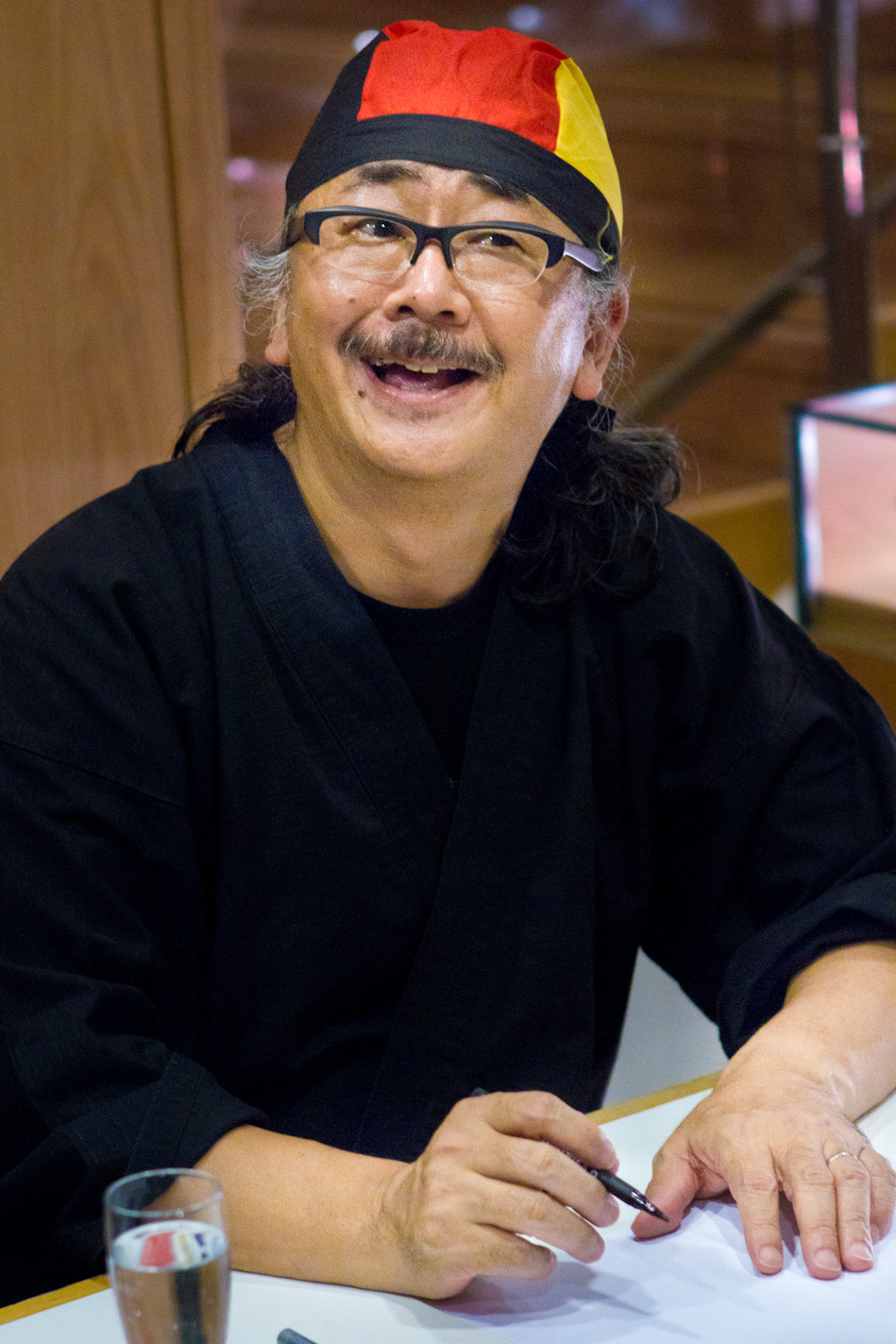
Nobuo Uematsu served as the series' sole composer from its inception in 1986 until Final Fantasy X in 2001, when he was joined by two others.

After the success of Final Fantasy, Uematsu remained with the series to compose the soundtrack to Final Fantasy II (1988). Although I and II were composed separately, music from the two games have only been released on albums together. These albums include a soundtrack album and two arranged albums. Final Fantasy III (1990) was released two years later and featured a soundtrack from Uematsu that has been lauded as one of the best soundtracks of any NES game. The soundtrack spawned two soundtrack albums, as well as a disc of vocal and orchestral arrangements.

Final Fantasy IV (1991) was the first game in the series to be released for the Super Famicom, and the resultant changes in the sound technology resulted in a composition process that Uematsu noted was "excruciating". Uematsu has stated that, beginning with this soundtrack, he started to move away from the idea that the soundtrack had to be solely an orchestral score. In addition to the soundtrack album, the music of IV was arranged and released in the style of Celtic music, performed by Máire Breatnach. It also sparked the release of an album of piano arrangements, something which would be repeated for every subsequent main-series game to date.

Having now gained experience with the Super Famicom sound chip, Uematsu felt that the sound quality of the soundtrack for the next game in the series, Final Fantasy V (1992), was much better than that of IV. He named this as the primary reason that the soundtrack album was two CDs long, a first for the series. Like IV, the discography of Final Fantasy V included an arranged and a piano album in addition to the main soundtrack album.

In 1994, Square released Final Fantasy VI (1994), the last for the Super Famicom, and the accompanying soundtrack has been considered one of the greatest video game soundtracks ever composed. The game's discography also includes orchestral and piano arrangement CDs, as well as EPs of unreleased tracks and character themes. The soundtrack included the first attempt in the Final Fantasy series to include a vocal track, "Aria di Mezzo Carattere", which has been described as "one of Uematsu's greatest achievements". This track features an unintelligible synthesized "voice" that harmonizes with the melody, as technical limitations for the SPC700 sound format chip prevented the use of an actual vocal track. The first actual vocals in a piece appeared in Final Fantasy VII.

Beginning with Final Fantasy VII (1997), the series moved platforms to the PlayStation. While the media capabilities of the PlayStation allowed for CD quality music, Uematsu opted instead to use Sequence format. The soundtrack album ran a record four discs, and Uematsu has stated that the move into the "PlayStation era", which allowed video game composers to use sounds recorded in the studio rather than from synthesizers, had "definitely been the biggest change" to video game music. VII was the first game in the series to include a track with digitized vocals, "One-Winged Angel", which has been described as Uematsu's "most recognizable contribution" to the music of the series. The piece, described as "a fanfare to impending doom", is said to not "follow any normal genre rules" and has been termed "possibly the most innovative idea in the series' musical history". The lyrics of the piece, a Latin choral track which plays at the climax of the game, were taken from the medieval poetry on which Carl Orff based his Carmina Burana, specifically the songs "Estuans Interius", "O Fortuna", "Veni, Veni, Venias" and "Ave Formosissima". There was a plan to use a "famous vocalist" for the ending piece as a "theme song" for the game, but the idea was dropped due to time constraints and thematic concerns. The idea of a theme song would be resurrected in the following installment of the series. In 2006, IGN ranked VII's music the best Final Fantasy soundtrack to date and cited the "gripping" character tracks and "One-Winged Angel" in particular as contributing factors. The discography of the original game only includes soundtrack, best-of, and piano albums. However, beginning in 2005 Square Enix produced a collection of media centered on the game and world of Final Fantasy VII entitled the Compilation of Final Fantasy VII. This collection has produced five additional soundtrack albums, each for a different game or animation.

The soundtrack of Final Fantasy VIII (1999), unlike that of VI and VII, did not include character themes, as Uematsu felt they would not be effective. In response to a question by IGN stating that the music of VIII was very dark and perhaps influenced by the plot of the game, Uematsu said that "the atmosphere of music varies depending on story line, of course, but it's also my intention to put various types of music into one game". Although the idea had not been used in the previous game, he thought a ballad would closely relate to the theme and characters of VIII, and composed "Eyes on Me", performed by Faye Wong. The song was released as a single, while Square produced soundtrack, orchestral, and piano albums for the game's music.

The music of Final Fantasy IX (2000) was based around a theme of Renaissance music, and was heavily inspired by previous Final Fantasy games, incorporating themes and motifs from earlier soundtracks. Uematsu felt previous games VII and VIII had a mood of realism, but that Final Fantasy IX was more of a fantasy, so "a serious piece as well as silly, fun pieces could fit in". Uematsu has claimed several times that the music of IX is his favorite work, as well as the one he is most proud of. Like Final Fantasy VIII, IX included a vocal theme, "Melodies of Life", which was sung by Emiko Shiratori. The game's discography includes albums of the original soundtrack, a selection of the best tracks, a piano arrangement album, an album of unreleased tracks, and a single of "Melodies of Life".

==== 2001–present: other composers ====
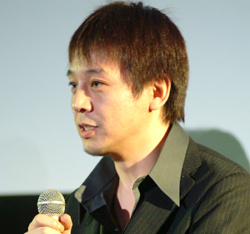
Hitoshi Sakimoto was the lead composer of Final Fantasy Tactics and Final Fantasy XII.

Final Fantasy X (2001) marked the first time in the series' history that Uematsu was not the sole composer for the soundtrack. Released on the PlayStation 2, the score was assisted by Masashi Hamauzu and Junya Nakano. Uematsu contributed 51 tracks, Hamauzu contributed 20 tracks and Nakano contributed 18 tracks to the game. The two other composers were chosen for the soundtrack based on their ability to create music that was different from Uematsu's while still working together. The discography for the game includes the soundtrack album, piano, and vocal arrangement albums, and an EP of tracks by Uematsu inspired by the game. The theme song for the game, "Suteki da ne", which translates to "Isn't it Wonderful?", was written by Nobuo Uematsu and Kazushige Nojima and was sung by Japanese folk singer Ritsuki Nakano, known as "Rikki", whom the music team contacted while searching for a singer whose music reflected an Okinawan atmosphere. "Suteki da ne" is sung in its original Japanese form in both the Japanese and English versions of X, and was released as a single.

Uematsu, along with Naoshi Mizuta and Kumi Tanioka, composed the score for Final Fantasy XI (2002). It was the last Final Fantasy soundtrack that Uematsu was a main composer for until Final Fantasy XIV, as he resigned from Square Enix in November 2004. The expansion packs were mostly scored by Mizuta alone. The opening of the game features choral music with lyrics in Esperanto. According to Uematsu, the choice of language was meant to symbolize the developers' hope that their online game could contribute to cross-cultural communication and cooperation. The game and each of its four expansion packs have produced a soundtrack album; the discography for the game also includes two piano albums, an album of unreleased tracks, two arranged albums, and a single for its vocal theme, "Distant World", which was composed by Uematsu and performed by Japanese opera singer Izumi Masuda.

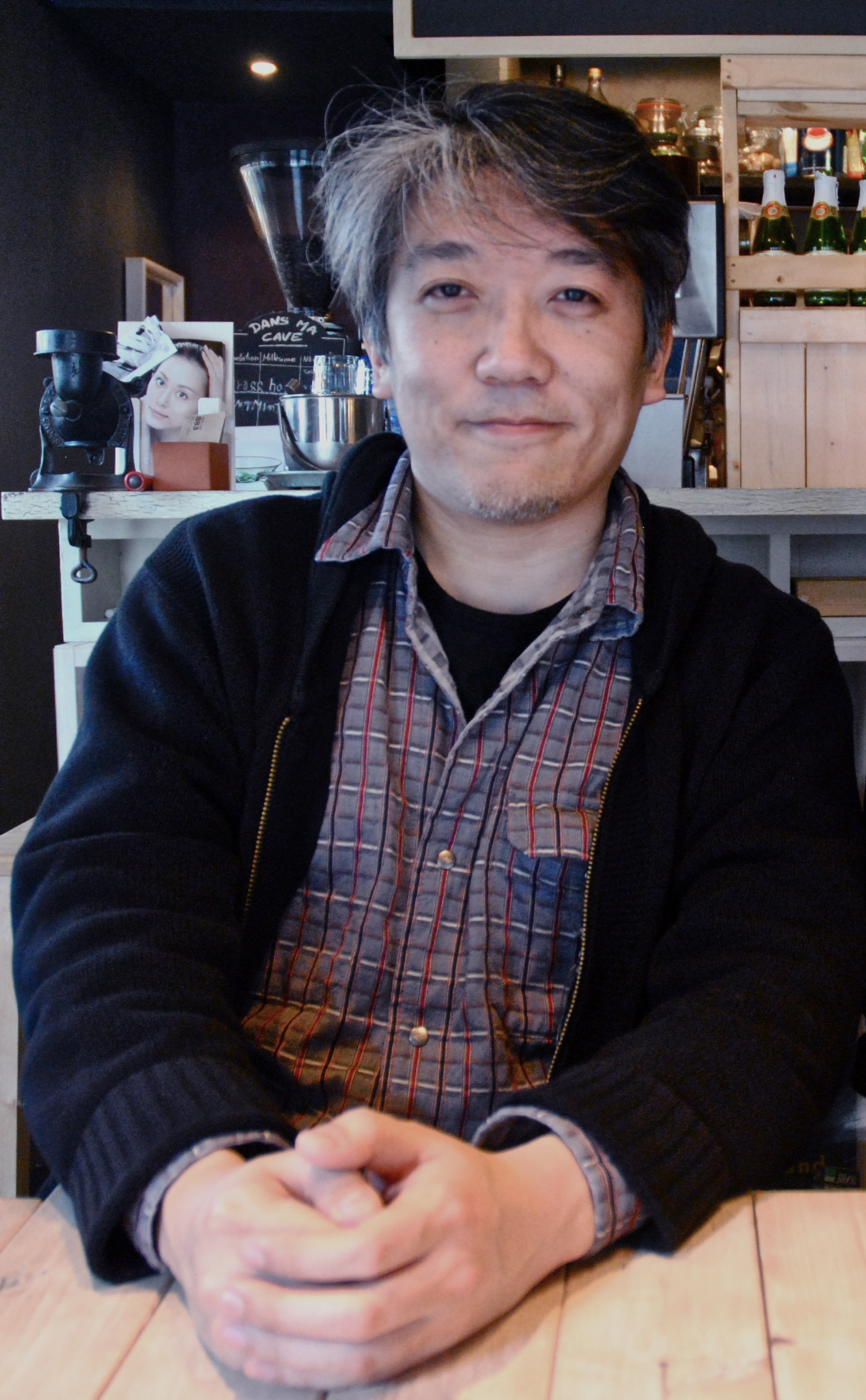
Masashi Hamauzu was the lead composer of Final Fantasy XIII and its sequels.

Final Fantasy XII (2006) was composed by Hitoshi Sakimoto, with six other compositions by Hayato Matsuo and Masaharu Iwata. Uematsu only contributed the game's ending theme song, "Kiss Me Good-Bye", which was performed by Angela Aki. Violinist Taro Hakase also contributed a piece named "Symphonic Poem 'Hope'", featured during the game's ending credits. Sakimoto was brought in to compose the soundtrack to the game by Yasumi Matsuno, the producer of the game, five months before the game was officially announced. Sakimoto experienced difficulty following in Uematsu's footsteps, but he decided to create a unique soundtrack in his own way, although he cites Uematsu as his biggest musical influence. Sakimoto did not meet with Uematsu for direction on creating the soundtrack and tried to avoid copying Uematsu's style from previous Final Fantasy soundtracks. However, he did attempt to ensure that his style would mesh with Uematsu's "Kiss Me Good-Bye" and the overall vision of the series. The current discography, while originally limited to the soundtrack album and singles for "Kiss Me Good-Bye" and "Symphonic Poem 'Hope'", was late in 2012 given an album of piano arrangements like most prior soundtracks in the series.

Final Fantasy XIII (2009) was composed by Masashi Hamauzu. Although its main theme was originally announced to be composed by Nobuo Uematsu, Uematsu instead gave it to Hamauzu to compose after being selected as the composer for Final Fantasy XIV, making XIII the first game in the main series to not have any work by Uematsu. The game has sparked the release of a soundtrack album, an arranged album, two gramophone record albums of music from the soundtrack, a piano album, and a single of the game's theme song "Because You're Here" (君がいるから, Kimi ga Iru Kara), sung by Sayuri Sugawara. The international versions of XIII feature the song "My Hands" sung by British singer Leona Lewis from her second album Echo.

Uematsu was hired through his "Smile Please" studio to score the original Final Fantasy XIV, the first game in the series in a decade to have a score completely composed by him at release. The theme song Answers was sung by Susan Calloway, with lyrics from game writers Yaeko Sato and Michal-Christopher Koji Fox. Post-release, and for the A Realm Reborn reboot, additional in-game music has been composed by Naoshi Mizuta, Ryo Yamazaki, Tsuyoshi Sekito, and Masayoshi Soken. The full official soundtrack with all 104 tracks from the original version of XIV was released in a single Blu-ray compilation on August 14, 2013. Titled Before Meteor: FINAL FANTASY XIV Original Soundtrack, the disc contains all of the music composed by Nobuo Uematsu for the original release, as well as music added on subsequent patches by Uematsu, Mizuta, Yamazaki, Sekito and Soken. Uematsu, along with Calloway and Koji Fox, also returned for the title theme to the game's 2015 expansion, Heavensward, titled Dragonsong. The majority of the music for updates to the game since 2014 has been composed by Soken, and soundtrack albums have been periodically released collecting the additional tracks.

The music for Final Fantasy XV (2016) was composed primarily by Yoko Shimomura. Having previously worked on the Kingdom Hearts series, among various other titles, Final Fantasy XV was her first project for the series. Shimomura was brought on board the project in 2006, when it was a spin-off title called Final Fantasy Versus XIII, (Note: Fainaru Fantajī Verusasu Sātīn (ファイナルファンタジーヴェルサスXIII)) and stayed in her role during the game's ten-year development cycle. Final Fantasy XV was expanded into a multimedia project dubbed the "Final Fantasy XV Universe", for which other composers were hired; John R. Graham composed the music for the film Kingsglaive: Final Fantasy XV, with additional tunes from Shimomura. Yasuhisa Inoue and Susumi Akizuki of Righttrack wrote the music for the original net animation Brotherhood, while a team from the music studio Unique Note, who also worked on the base game, handled the mobile spin-off title Justice Monsters V. English indie rock band Florence and the Machine collaborated on three songs for the game, including a cover of Ben E. King's "Stand by Me", which acted as one of the two official theme songs. Later contributors to the soundtrack, via downloadable content packs, were Keiichi Okabe, Naoshi Mizuta, Yasunori Mitsuda, Nobuo Uematsu, Tadayoshi Makino, and Taku Iwasaki. Multiple albums have been released containing music from Final Fantasy XV and its spin-off media. The songs from Florence and the Machine were released in August as digital singles under the banner title "Songs from Final Fantasy XV".

The music for Final Fantasy XVI (2023) was principally composed by Masayoshi Soken, with additional tracks by Takafumi Imamura, Daiki Ishikawa, Saya Yasaki, and Justin Frieden. The composers had previously worked on Final Fantasy XIV. The ending themes were "Tsuki Wo Miteita – Moongazing", written and performed by Kenshi Yonezu, and "My Star", written by Soken and performed by Amanda Achen. "Tsuki Wo Miteita – Moongazing" was released as a digital single, and albums were released for the game and its DLC.

=== Spin-offs ===
==== Compilation of Final Fantasy VII ====
The Compilation of Final Fantasy VII is the formal title for a series of games and animated features developed by Square Enix based in the world and continuity of Final Fantasy VII. Spearheaded by Tetsuya Nomura and Yoshinori Kitase, the series consists of several titles across various platforms, all of which are extensions of the VII's story. The first announced element of the series was Final Fantasy VII Advent Children, an animated sequel to the original game, though the first to be released was the mobile phone game Before Crisis: Final Fantasy VII. Before Crisis's soundtrack was composed by Takeharu Ishimoto, while Advent Children was scored by Nobuo Uematsu, Keiji Kawamori, Kenichiro Fukui, and Tsuyoshi Sekito. Other titles in the series are Dirge of Cerberus: Final Fantasy VII, the soundtrack of which was composed by Masashi Hamauzu, Crisis Core: Final Fantasy VII, which was primarily composed by Takeharu Ishimoto with a few tracks provided by Kazuhiko Toyama, and Last Order: Final Fantasy VII, also composed by Ishimoto.

Advent Children featured a song by former Japanese rock band Boøwy's singer Kyosuke Himuro in its ending credits, the Dirge of Cerberus soundtrack contained two songs by Gackt, including its theme song "Redemption", and Crisis Core's theme song, "Why", was performed by Ayaka. Each element of the series sparked its own soundtrack album except for Before Crisis and Last Order, which had their soundtracks released together in one album. Dirge of Cerberus also had a download-only soundtrack album for its Japan-only multiplayer mode, while "Redemption" and "Why" each had a single release by their respective artists.

==== Final Fantasy X-2 ====
Final Fantasy X-2 (2003), was the first direct video game sequel to any Final Fantasy game. Despite having composed the majority of the soundtrack for Final Fantasy X, Nobuo Uematsu did not contribute any music to the project. No tracks from X or other games in the series were used in the game. In an attempt to make a different style of music for the game than previous franchise titles, Square brought Noriko Matsueda and Takahito Eguchi on board to compose the music for X-2, as the developers felt they were the "perfect fit" to incorporate a "pop" style into the music. The game includes two songs with vocalized elements, one of which, the J-Pop song "real Emotion", was written by Ken Kato and composed by Kazuhiro Hara. The other, J-Pop ballad "1000 Words", was written by scenario writers Kazushige Nojima and Daisuke Watanabe. Matsueda and Eguchi composed and arranged the track. Both songs were sung by Jade Villalon from Sweetbox in the English version of the game, and are available as bonus tracks on the Japanese release of her album Adagio. In the Japanese version of the game both the songs were sung by Kumi Koda and were released as a single entitled real Emotion/1000 no Kotoba. Koda also released her own English versions of the songs on her CD single Come with Me, with slightly different versions of the lyrics than Jade. In addition to Come with Me, the collection of music for X-2 includes the two-disc soundtrack album, a piano album, a soundtrack album for the Final Fantasy X-2 International + Last Mission version of the game, a single for the song "Eternity ~ Memory of Lightwaves", and a set of three singles themed around the three main characters of the game.

==== Fabula Nova Crystallis Final Fantasy ====
Fabula Nova Crystallis Final Fantasy (Note: Japanese: ファブラ ノヴァ クリスタリス ファイナルファンタジー, Hepburn: Fabura Nova Kurisutarisu Fainaru Fantajī) (Note: Translated by Square Enix as "The New Tale of the Crystal".) is a series of games within the franchise. It includes two sequels to Final Fantasy XIII: Final Fantasy XIII-2 (2011) and Lightning Returns: Final Fantasy XIII (2013). Both games' soundtracks were composed by Hamauzu, Mizuta, and Mitsuto Suzuki. XIII-2 resulted in a soundtrack album and an arranged album, while Lightning Returns resulted in a preview album, a soundtrack album, and an arranged album. Other games in the subseries are Final Fantasy Type-0, Final Fantasy Agito, and Final Fantasy Awakening.

==== Tactics and Ivalice Alliance ====
The Final Fantasy Tactics series is a spin-off of the main Final Fantasy series, consisting of primarily tactical role-playing games with heavy thematic similarities to the main series. After Final Fantasy XII was set in the same world, Ivalice, as the two games in the series Final Fantasy Tactics (1997) and Tactics Advance (2003), all future games set in the game world became part of the new Ivalice Alliance subseries. These games to date include Final Fantasy XII: Revenant Wings (2007), Final Fantasy Tactics: The War of the Lions (2007), Tactics A2: Grimoire of the Rift (2007), and Final Fantasy XII International Zodiac Job System (2007).

The music of these games has been primarily composed by Hitoshi Sakimoto, who also composed the main-series game set in Ivalice, Final Fantasy XII. Masaharu Iwata shared compositional duties with him for Tactics; Sakimoto composed 47 tracks for the game while Iwata composed the other 24. Sakimoto composed almost all of the music for Tactics Advance, while Uematsu contributed the main theme and Kaori Ohkoshi and Ayako Saso composed additional battle tracks. Both games have a soundtrack album, while Tactics Advance inspired an arranged album. Sakimoto again was the composer for Tactics A2: Grimoire of the Rift, though this time he was supported by composers from his studio Basiscape, and it too sparked a soundtrack album release. He also scored Revenant Wings, though it primarily consisted of arrangements of his previous work and has not been released as a separate album, and his work on Tactics was used as the score for the spin-off series Crystal Defenders.

==== Crystal Chronicles ====
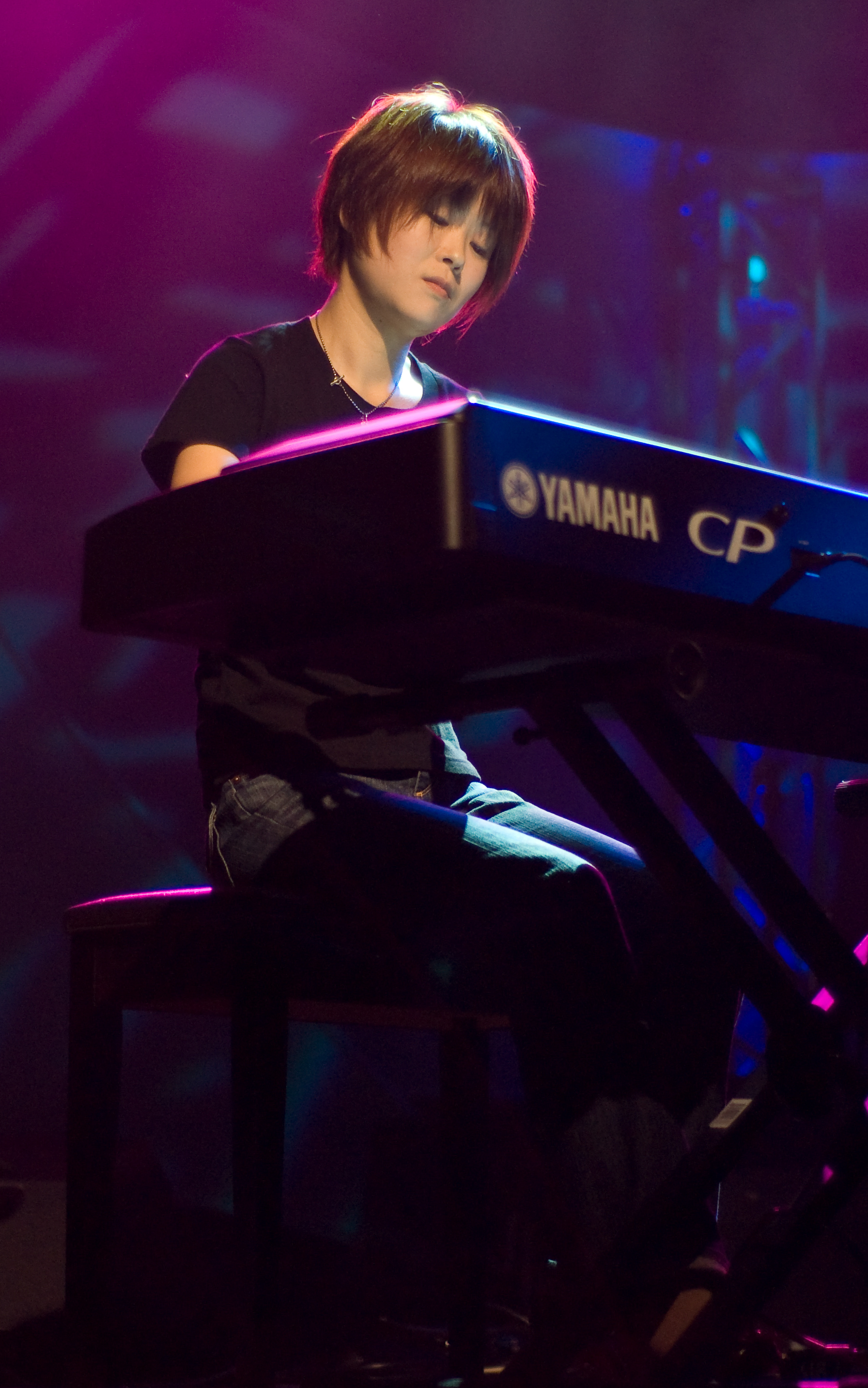
Kumi Tanioka was the main composer of the Crystal Chronicles series.

Another spin-off of the main series, the Final Fantasy Crystal Chronicles series consists of Crystal Chronicles (2004), its sequel Ring of Fates (2007), and their spin-offs My Life as a King (2008), Echoes of Time (2009), My Life as a Darklord (2009), and The Crystal Bearers (2009). Kumi Tanioka is the main composer for the series, having composed the music for all of the released games. Her only work on the main series to date has been as one of the co-composers for Final Fantasy XI. She did not compose the soundtrack for The Crystal Bearers; Hidenori Iwasaki composed it instead. Tanioka is known for using an eclectic mix of instruments in her albums; she has described the musical style for the soundtrack to Crystal Chronicles as being based on "ancient instruments". The soundtrack has extensive use of many medieval and Renaissance musical instruments—such as the recorder, the crumhorn and the lute; creating a distinctively rustic feel—and also follows the practices and styles of medieval music. For the soundtrack to Ring of Fates, Tanioka purposefully did not focus on "world music", instead focusing on "creating a new landscape containing the same atmosphere". Echoes of Time also incorporates a variety of instruments, including oboes, xylophones, marimbas, and Latin guitars.

Of the released games, Crystal Chronicles, Ring of Fates, and Echoes of Time are the only ones to have a released soundtrack. Crystal Chronicles also has sparked a single of its theme song, "Sound of the Wind" (カゼノネ, Kaze no Ne), composed by Kumi Tanioka and performed by Fujimoto Yae. Ring of Fates also has an associated single of its theme song, "A World Without Stars" (星のない世界, Hoshi no Nai Sekai), written and performed by Aiko. Echoes of Time did not have a theme song.

==== Chocobo ====
The Chocobo series is a spin-off series of games first developed by Square and later by Square Enix, featuring a super deformed version of the Final Fantasy series mascot—the chocobo—as the protagonist. These games include Mystery Dungeon installments and a variety of minigame collections over a wide variety of video game consoles. The series includes over a dozen games, most of which have been released only in Japan. The soundtracks to the games have been composed by a wide variety of composers, and many of the soundtracks are composed primarily of arranged versions of tracks from previous Final Fantasy soundtracks, especially the "chocobo" theme.

Only some of the games have led to separate soundtrack releases. The first of these was Chocobo's Mystery Dungeon (チョコボの不思議なダンジョン オリジナル・サウンドトラック, Chocobo no Fushigina Dungeon), which was scored by Masashi Hamauzu and inspired an orchestral arrangement album also composed by Hamauzu. The soundtrack of Chocobo's Dungeon 2 was composed by Kumi Tanioka, Yasuhiro Kawakami, Tsuyoshi Sekito, Kenji Ito, and Nobuo Uematsu. The games whose soundtracks were primarily composed of previous Final Fantasy and Chocobo tracks were Final Fantasy Fables: Chocobo's Dungeon, which was arranged by Yuzo Takahashi of Joe Down Studio, Chocobo Racing, whose original tracks were composed by Kenji Ito, and Final Fantasy Fables: Chocobo Tales. The sequel to Chocobo Tales, Chocobo and the Magic Picture Book: The Witch, The Maiden, and the Five Heroes, contains mainly original works, and the two games were scored by Yuzo Takahashi. Unlike the other Chocobo games, they had a joint soundtrack album release, while Chocobo Tales had a previous download-only "best of" album.

==== Others ====
Other spin-offs of the main Final Fantasy series include Final Fantasy Adventure (1991), a spin-off game later also considered as the first game in the Mana series, which had references to Final Fantasy removed in its remake, Sword of Mana. It was scored by Kenji Ito, with one track by Uematsu. Final Fantasy Mystic Quest (1992) is an SNES game scored by Ryuji Sasai and Yasuhiro Kawakami. Final Fantasy: Legend of the Crystals (1994) is an animated sequel to Final Fantasy V, and was scored by Masahiko Sato. Final Fantasy: The Spirits Within (2001), a computer animated science fiction film, was scored by Elliot Goldenthal, and Final Fantasy: Unlimited (2001), a 25-episode anime series, was scored by Nobuo Uematsu, Shiro Hamaguchi, and Akifumi Tada. The soundtracks to The Spirits Within and Mystic Quest were released as separate albums, while Unlimited had two soundtrack album releases. Final Fantasy Adventure saw the release of a soundtrack album, an arranged album, a release which compiled both previous albums together, and a soundtrack album for its remake.

== Merchandise ==
The majority of games in the franchise, including all of the main series games, have led to a soundtrack album release. Many have also inspired orchestral, vocal, or piano arrangement albums as well. These albums have been produced and reprinted by a number of different companies, including DigiCube, NTT Publishing, Square Enix itself, and many others. Additionally, many albums have been made available at the iTunes Music Store. In addition to the regular albums, a number of compilation albums of pieces from several Final Fantasy games have been produced both by Square Enix and outside groups, both officially and unofficially. These albums include music directly from the games, as well as arrangements covering a variety of styles. Square Enix produced the first album, Final Fantasy 1987–1994 (1994) and has since produced 13 albums, leading up to Final Fantasy Remix (2008). The first compilation album produced by an outside group was The Best of Final Fantasy 1994–1999: A Musical Tribute, released in 2000 by Sherman F. Heinig; the newest is Voices of the Lifestream, an unlicensed download-only album from OverClocked ReMix released in 2007.

Music from the original soundtracks has been arranged for the piano and published by DOREMI Music Publishing. Books are available for every main series game except for Final Fantasy V, as well as for Advent Children and Crystal Chronicles. All piece in each book have been rewritten by Asako Niwa as beginning to intermediate level piano solos, though they are meant to sound as much like the originals as possible. "Best of" collections and arrangements for guitar solos and piano duets are also available.

Additionally, the actual piano sheet music from each of the ten Final Fantasy Piano Collections albums has been published as ten corresponding music books by Yamaha Music Media. Each book contains the original music, exactly as arranged and performed on the albums. Unlike the Original Score arrangements, these pieces are intended only for advanced players as they are generally more difficult. Sheet music for the Final Fantasy XI Piano Collections album included in the Final Fantasy XI OST Premium Box Set was included in that box set, and, like the album itself, is unavailable for purchase elsewhere; sheet music for the identically named standalone piano album is published by Yamaha.

== Public performances ==
Rinoa Heartilly shown at the Los Angeles Dear Friends concert.

Music from Final Fantasy has been performed numerous times in concert tours and other live performances. Music from the series was played in the first four concerts of the Tokyo Philharmonic Orchestra's Orchestral Game Music Concerts series from 1991 to 1994, and each concert has been released on an album. It has also been played in the Video Games Live concert tour from 2005 to date as well as the Play! A Video Game Symphony world tour from 2006 onwards, for which Nobuo Uematsu composed the opening fanfare that accompanies each performance. Final Fantasy music was played at the Symphonic Game Music Concert series, a series of annual German video game music concerts notable for being the first of their kind outside Japan, from 2003 to 2007. The music made up one fourth of the Symphonic Fantasies concerts in September 2009 which were produced by the creators of the Symphonic Game Music Concert series. It has also been played by the Australian Eminence Symphony Orchestra, an independent symphony orchestra specializing in classical music from video games.

Music from the series has also been played in specific Final Fantasy concerts and concert series. After the success of the 20020220 Music from Final Fantasy concert in 2002, a recording of which was produced as an album, the Tour de Japon: Music from Final Fantasy, was launched in Japan in 2004. It was followed by the Dear Friends -Music from Final Fantasy- tour in the United States that same year, which was originally scheduled to be a single concert but grew into a year-long tour. In 2005, a concert entitled More Friends: Music from Final Fantasy was performed to coincide with the one-year anniversary of the first Dear Friends concert and also had an album published of the performance. The latest Final Fantasy tour is the worldwide Distant Worlds: Music from Final Fantasy tour, which began in Sweden in 2007 and still continues to date. A recording of its first performance was released as an album. Nobuo Uematsu additionally plays with The Black Mages, a band which performs Final Fantasy music in a rock music style. They have performed music live in concert, as well as with orchestras as part of various concert tours. They have released three albums to date, as well as DVDs of their live performances.

From November 2003 to April 2004, Square Enix U.S.A. launched an AOL Radio station dedicated to music from the series, initially carrying complete tracks from Final Fantasy XI in addition to samplings from VII through X. The station was relaunched in July 2006 and still remains on the site. In the 2004 Summer Olympics, the American synchronized swimming duo consisting of Alison Bartosik and Anna Kozlova were awarded the bronze medal for their performance to "Liberi Fatali" from Final Fantasy VIII. "Born Anew" from Final Fantasy XIII, "Victory Fanfare" from Final Fantasy VII, and the "Main Theme" all played at the 2020 Summer Olympics opening ceremony.

== Sales ==
By 2010, at least eight Final Fantasy soundtrack albums had debuted in the top ten of the Oricon albums chart: Final Fantasy VI Original Sound Version, Final Fantasy VII Original Soundtrack, Final Fantasy VIII Original Soundtrack, Final Fantasy IX Original Soundtrack, Final Fantasy X Original Soundtrack, Final Fantasy X-2 Original Soundtrack, Final Fantasy XII Original Soundtrack, and Final Fantasy XIII Original Soundtrack, the latter debuting at #3 on the chart. As of 2010, the only Final Fantasy albums that failed to reach the top 30 of the Oricon albums chart were the soundtracks for the Final Fantasy Tactics series and Crystal Chronicles series.

"My Hands", the Leona Lewis theme song for the North American and European versions of Final Fantasy XIII, was not released as a single, but the album it originates from, Echo (2009), sold over 1 million copies in Europe, including over 600,000 in the United Kingdom. Ariana Grande's "Touch It" (orchestral remix), which is featured in Final Fantasy: Brave Exvius, was not released as a single, but it originates from Dangerous Woman (2016).

== Legacy ==
Nobuo Uematsu's Final Fantasy music has appeared multiple times in the annual top 300 Classic FM Hall of Fame, including five appearances in the annual top 20. In 2012, "Aerith's Theme", written by Uematsu for Final Fantasy VII, was voted into the number 16 position in the annual Classic FM (UK) "Hall of Fame" top 300 chart. It was the first time that a piece of music written for a video game had appeared in the chart. In 2013, music from the Final Fantasy series received even greater support and was voted into the third position on the Classic FM Hall of Fame. Uematsu and his Final Fantasy music subsequently appeared at number seven in 2014, number nine in 2015, number 17 in 2016, and in the top half of the list for every subsequent year through 2019.

Eímear Noone of Classic FM states that Nobuo Uematsu's Final Fantasy score "changed the course of classical music" by "setting concert halls alight and inspiring a new generation of classical music lovers". Elizabeth Davis of Classic FM states that Final Fantasy helped introduce "a whole generation to the magic of orchestral music" and "inspired a generation of composers, many of whom have gone on to write music for video games". She states that the "epic soundtracks of games like Red Dead Redemption 2, Assassin's Creed and God of War, all owe a debt to Uematsu, who made the world wake up to the power of video game music". She notes that "Aerith's Theme" from Final Fantasy VII in particular is "one of the most famous pieces of video game music ever written" and is rooted in romantic music.
