= Music of the Mana series =

Music of the video game series Mana

The Mana series, known in Japan as Seiken Densetsu (聖剣伝説; lit. "Holy Sword Legend"), is a role-playing video game series from Square Enix, created by Koichi Ishii. The series began as a handheld side story to Square's flagship franchise Final Fantasy, although most Final Fantasy-inspired elements were subsequently dropped, starting with the second installment, Secret of Mana. It has since grown to include games of various genres within the fictional world of Mana. The music of the Mana series includes soundtracks and arranged albums of music from the series, which is currently composed of Final Fantasy Adventure and its remake Sword of Mana, Secret of Mana, Trials of Mana, Legend of Mana, Dawn of Mana, Children of Mana, Friends of Mana, Heroes of Mana, Circle of Mana, and Rise of Mana. Each game except for Friends and Circle has produced a soundtrack album, while Adventure has sparked an arranged album as well as a combined soundtrack and arranged album, Legend of Mana has an additional promotional EP, and music from Secret and Trials were combined into an arranged album. For the series' 20th anniversary, a 20-disc box set of previously released albums was produced, as well as an album of arrangements by Kenji Ito, composer for several games in the series.

The music of Final Fantasy Adventure was composed by Kenji Ito, while Hiroki Kikuta composed Secret of Mana and Trials of Mana and Yoko Shimomura wrote the score to Legend of Mana. The music of the World of Mana subseries, composed of Children, Dawn, Friends, and Heroes of Mana, was composed by many different composers, with Ito, Kikuta, Shimomura, Tsuyoshi Sekito, Masayoshi Soken, and Ryuichi Sakamoto composing Dawn, Ito, Masaharu Iwata, and Takayuki Aihara writing Children, and Shimomura composing the music of Friends and Heroes. Rise of Mana was composed by an ensemble group including Ito, Kikuta, Shimomura, Sekito, Yasuhiro Yamanaka, and Kokia. Music from the series has been performed in live concerts such as the Orchestral Game Concerts and the Symphonic Game Music Concerts, and made up one fourth of the Symphonic Fantasies concert in Cologne, Germany. Music from the Mana series has also been arranged for the piano and published as sheet music books.

== Final Fantasy Adventure ==
Seiken Densetsu Original Sound Version

Soundtrack album by Kenji Ito
- Released: July 15, 1991
- Genre: Chiptune, Video game soundtrack
- Length: 34:40
- Label: NTT Publishing/Square

Final Fantasy Adventure, released as Seiken Densetsu: Final Fantasy Gaiden in Japan and Mystic Quest in Europe and marketed as a Final Fantasy spin-off, was composed by Kenji Ito; it was his second original score after that of SaGa 2 and his first solo work. The game was released in 1991 on the original Game Boy. It was remade in 2003 for the Game Boy Advance as Sword of Mana, wherein features of the original game were reworked to be brought more in line with the direction the Mana series had taken with the later games. It also severed the game from the Final Fantasy series. Ito was also the composer for the 2003 Sword of Mana, for which he remixed some pieces from Final Fantasy Adventure as well as composing new ones. Ito's music is mainly inspired by images from the game rather than outside influences, but he never played the games themselves. Final Fantasy Adventure received a soundtrack album and an arranged album, which were later released again as a single album. Sword of Mana also sparked a soundtrack album.

=== Original Sound Version ===
Seiken Densetsu Original Sound Version is a soundtrack album of music from Final Fantasy Adventure. It was composed by Kenji Ito, with the exception of "Theme of Chocobo", which was composed by Nobuo Uematsu for the Final Fantasy series. The album covers 27 tracks and has a duration of 34:40. It was published by NTT Publishing/Square on July 15, 1991, with the catalog number N23D-003.

The album was well received by critics such as Ryan Mattich of RPGFan, who termed it full of "quality compositions and timeless melodies" that created a "nostalgic listening experience". Another reviewer, in their review of the combined album, claimed that the sound hardware limitations of the Game Boy "forces composers to create strong melodies" and that the Final Fantasy Adventure soundtrack was "a perfect example of what quality Gameboy music should sound like".

Track list
No.	Title	Japanese title	Length
1.	"Rising Sun"	Rising Sun	1:43
2.	"Fighting Arena"	格闘技場	0:45
3.	"Requiem"	Requiem	1:01
4.	"Endless Battlefield"	果てしなき戦場	1:29
5.	"Village"	村	1:04
6.	"Town (Unused Track)"	街 (未発表曲)	1:45
7.	"Dwarves' Theme"	ドワーフのテーマ	0:52
8.	"Glance Dukedom"	グランス公国	1:30
9.	"Dungeon 1"	ダンジョン1	1:34
10.	"Fight 1"	戦闘１	1:27
11.	"Royal Palace"	王宮のテーマ	1:00
12.	"Mana's Mission"	マナの使命	1:13
13.	"Danger!"	Danger！	0:29
14.	"Jema's Realization"	ジェマの自覚	1:03
15.	"In Search of the Sacred Sword"	聖剣を求めて	1:33
16.	"Birth of Chocobo"	チョコボ誕生	0:29
17.	"Theme of Chocobo"	チョコボのテーマ	0:52
18.	"Dungeon 2"	ダンジョン2	1:11
19.	"Moogle"	モーグリ	0:10
20.	"Dungeon 3"	ダンジョン3	0:59
21.	"Fight 2"	戦闘2	1:32
22.	"In Sorrow"	哀しみのなかで	1:36
23.	"Let Your Thoughts Ride on Knowledge"	想いは調べにのせて	1:02
24.	"Mana Palace"	マナの神殿	1:37
25.	"Julius' Ambition"	ジュリアスの野望	0:34
26.	"Final Battle"	最後の決戦	2:03
27.	"Legend Forever"	伝説よ永遠に	4:07

=== Let Thoughts Ride on Knowledge ===
Seiken Densetsu: Let Thoughts Ride on Knowledge

Soundtrack album by Takayuki Hattori, Kenji Ito
- Released: September 30, 1991
- Genre: Video game soundtrack
- Length: 35:11
- Label: NTT Publishing/Square

Seiken Densetsu: Let Thoughts Ride on Knowledge is a soundtrack album of music arranged from the Final Fantasy Adventure soundtrack. The original music was composed by Kenji Ito, while the versions on the album were arranged by Takayuki Hattori. The album covers 7 tracks and has a duration of 35:11. Each track covers several different songs from the original soundtrack. The pieces are arranged in an orchestral style, with moods ranging from "soft" to "powerful". It was published by NTT Publishing/Square on September 30, 1991, with the catalog number N30D-005.

The album was well received by critics such as Ryan Mattich of RPGFan, who called it "an album of epic ambition" and said that it let "these timeless melodies live on, freed from the shackles of sound hardware limitations". Kero Hazel of Square Enix Music Online agreed, saying that "those 35 minutes of arranged music are worth every penny" in their review of the combined album. Another reviewer of the combined album called the tracks a "combination of great compositions and excellent arranging" and said that the tracks "flow smoothly between each other" creating "a superb thirty-five minutes of music".

Track list
No.	Title	Japanese title	Length
1.	"Prologue - Determination" (from "Rising Sun", "Fighting Arena", "Endless Battlefield")	序 章—決意	3:30
2.	"2nd Chapter - Menace" (from "Glance Dukedom", "Dungeon 1", "Fight 1 ")	第二章—脅威	5:58
3.	"3rd Chapter - Mission" (from "Village", "Royal Palace", "Mana's Mission")	第三章—使命	5:55
4.	"4th Chapter - Comrades" (from "Birth of Chocobo", "Chocobo Theme")	第四章—仲間	4:50
5.	"5th Chapter - Parting" (from "Dungeon 2", Fight 2", "In Sorrow", "Let Thoughts Ride on Knowledge")	第五章—別離	6:55
6.	"6th Chapter - Decisive Battle" (from "Mana Palace", "Julius' Ambition", "Last Battle")	第六章—決戦	3:43
7.	"Final Chapter - Life" (from "Legend Forever")	終 章—生命	4:12

=== Sound Collections ===
Final Fantasy Gaiden: Seiken Densetsu Sound Collections

Soundtrack album by Kenji Ito, Takayuki Hattori
- Released: August 25, 1995; October 1, 2004
- Genre: Video game soundtrack
- Length: 34:40
- Label: NTT Publishing

Final Fantasy Gaiden: Seiken Densetsu Sound Collections is a soundtrack album of music from Final Fantasy Adventure combining its soundtrack album and arranged album. The music was composed by Kenji Ito, while the arranged tracks, which comprise the first seven tracks of this album, were arranged by Takayuki Hattori. The album covers 34 tracks and has a duration of 69:51. It was published by NTT Publishing on August 25, 1995, with the catalog number PSCN-5029, and republished on October 1, 2004, with the catalog number NTCP-5029.

The combined album was as well received as the individual albums that make it up, with RPGFan calling it "one fantastic CD" that combined the "superb" arranged tracks with the "expressive" original tracks. Kero Hazel said that the album was worth buying for either component CD alone, if one did not already have them, but that the combination together made it a "fantastic album" of "great music".

Track list
No.	Title	Japanese title	Length
1.	"Prologue - Determination"	序 章―決意	3:30
2.	"2nd Chapter - Menace"	第二章―脅威	5:58
3.	"3rd Chapter - Mission"	第三章―使命	5:55
4.	"4th Chapter - Comrades"	第四章―仲間	4:50
5.	"5th Chapter - Parting"	第五章―別離	6:55
6.	"6th Chapter - Decisive Battle"	第六章―決戦	3:43
7.	"Final Chapter - Life"	終 章―生命	4:12
8.	"Rising Sun"	Rising Sun	1:43
9.	"Fighting Arena"	格闘技場	0:45
10.	"Requiem"	Requiem	1:01
11.	"Endless Battlefield"	果てしなき戦場	1:29
12.	"Village"	村	1:04
13.	"Town (Unused Track)"	街 (ゲーム未収録曲）	1:45
14.	"Dwarves' Theme"	ドワーフのテーマ	0:52
15.	"Glance Dukedom"	グランス公国	1:30
16.	"Dungeon 1"	ダンジョン1	1:34
17.	"Fight 1"	戦闘1	1:27
18.	"Royal Palace"	王宮のテーマ	1:00
19.	"Mana's Mission"	マナの使命	1:13
20.	"Danger!"	Danger！	0:29
21.	"Jema's Realization"	ジェマの自覚	1:03
22.	"In Search of the Sacred Sword"	聖剣を求めて	1:33
23.	"Birth of Chocobo"	チョコボ誕生	0:29
24.	"Theme of Chocobo"	チョコボのテーマ	0:52
25.	"Dungeon 2"	ダンジョン2	1:11
26.	"Moogle"	モーグリ	0:10
27.	"Dungeon 3"	ダンジョン3	0:59
28.	"Fight 2"	戦闘2	1:32
29.	"In Sorrow"	哀しみのなかで	1:36
30.	"Let Thoughts Ride on Knowledge"	想いは調べにのせて	1:02
31.	"Mana Palace"	マナの神殿	1:37
32.	"Julius' Ambition"	ジュリアスの野望	0:34
33.	"Final Battle"	最後の決戦	2:03
34.	"Legend Forever"	伝説よ永遠に	4:07

=== Sword of Mana ===
Sword of Mana Premium Soundtrack

Soundtrack album by Kenji Ito
- Released: August 27, 2003; October 20, 2004
- Genre: Video game soundtrack
- Length: 1:42:51
- Label: DigiCube; Square Enix (reprint)

Sword of Mana Premium Soundtrack is a soundtrack album of music from Sword of Mana, the enhanced remake of Final Fantasy Adventure. It was composed by Kenji Ito, and included reworked tracks from the original game as well as new material. The second disc of the album contains piano arrangements of songs from the soundtrack, while a bonus disc included in the first edition of the album contains an orchestra arrangement of "Rising Sun ~ Endless Battlefield". The album covers 48 tracks and has a duration of 1:42:51, including the bonus disc. It was published by DigiCube on August 27, 2003, with the catalog numbers SSCX-10097~8, and republished by Square Enix on October 20, 2004, with the catalog numbers SQEX-10038~9.

The album reached #118 on the Japan Oricon charts. Patrick Gann of RPGFan enjoyed it, calling it a "truly a gem". Estimating that around twenty percent of the original tracks had received "significant changes", he applauded the increase in sound quality and said that he "enjoy[ed] the OST tracks a great deal". The addition of the piano tracks and the orchestral track made the album a "fine soundtrack" and he said that acquiring the soundtrack would be a "very, very good idea". RPGamer, in their review of the game, said that the arrangements by Ito were "quite pleasing to the ear", though they noted that the quality of the music was diminished by the "terrible speakers" of the Game Boy Advance.

Track list

Disc 1
No.	Title	Japanese title	Length
1.	"Prologue ~Awakening Story~"	プロローグ～目覚めゆく物語～	1:57
2.	"Rising Sun"	Rising Sun	2:09
3.	"A Boy's Dream"	少年の夢	2:23
4.	"Fighting Arena"	格闘技場	1:57
5.	"Requiem"	Requiem	1:10
6.	"Endless Battlefield"	果てしなき戦場	1:50
7.	"Dungeon"	Dungeon	2:22
8.	"Battle 1 ~Believe in Victory~"	戦闘1～勝利を信じて～	1:59
9.	"Jema's Realization"	ジェマの自覚	1:59
10.	"Prayer"	祈り	1:32
11.	"A Girl's Admiration"	少女の憧れ	1:57
12.	"Village"	村	1:57
13.	"Easy Scenery"	やさしさの風景	2:16
14.	"Royal Palace Theme"	王宮のテーマ	1:28
15.	"Placing Thought Under Investigation"	想いは調べにのせて	1:05
16.	"Mana's Mission"	マナの使命	1:50
17.	"Chain of Fate"	運命の鎖	2:01
18.	"Under the Starry Sky"	満天の星の下で	1:12
19.	"In Search of the Holy Sword"	聖剣を求めて	1:59
20.	"Cactus House"	サボテンハウス	0:36
21.	"Dwarves' Theme"	ドワーフのテーマ	1:09
22.	"Nightmare"	悪夢	1:45
23.	"Temptation of Doom"	深淵の誘惑	1:41
24.	"Lost World Signpost"	迷界の道標	1:52
25.	"Infringement of Time"	時の侵食	1:51
26.	"Entwined Heart"	からみつく心	1:58
27.	"Reminiscence Investigation"	追憶の調べ	1:01
28.	"Sprint to the Future"	未来への疾走	2:43
29.	"Danger!"	Danger!	0:36
30.	"Battle 2 ~Touched by Courage and Pride~"	戦闘2～勇気と誇りを胸に～	1:56
31.	"In Sorrow"	哀しみのなかで	2:27
32.	"Lovely Face"	愛しい面影	2:16
33.	"Time of Determination"	決断の時	2:35
34.	"Broken World"	壊れゆく世界	1:54
35.	"Mana's Temple"	マナの神殿	2:11
36.	"Unvanishing Pain"	消せない傷み	2:16
37.	"Eternal Person"	永遠をゆく者	2:11
38.	"Final Battle"	最後の決戦	1:41
39.	"Epilogue ~A New World~"	エピローグ～新たなる世界～	2:29
40.	"Legend Forever"	伝説よ永遠に	3:07

Disc 2
No.	Title	Japanese title	Length
1.	"Grateful Memories"	Grateful Memories	4:45
2.	"Pure Smile"	Pure Smile	3:33
3.	"Rainy Tears"	Rainy Tears	4:39
4.	"Solitude"	Solitude	4:39
5.	"Lost Scene"	Lost Scene	4:10
6.	"Hold Your Heart"	Hold Your Heart	4:52
7.	"Ever Promise"	Ever Promise	4:23

== Secret of Mana and Trials of Mana ==
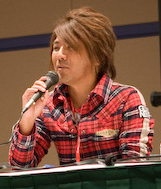
Secret of Mana and Trials of Mana composer Hiroki Kikuta

The scores for 1993's Secret of Mana, originally released as Seiken Densetsu 2 in Japan, and 1995's Trials of Mana, originally released as Seiken Densetsu 3 in Japan, were both composed by Hiroki Kikuta. Kikuta was chosen for Secret of Mana after Kenji Ito, who was originally slated for the project, was unable to work on the sequel due to other demands, including the soundtrack to Romancing SaGa. At the time, Square typically had composers dedicated to one game throughout its development, and so Ito could not take on both projects at once. It was Kikuta's first video game score. Both games were produced for the Super Nintendo Entertainment System. Despite difficulties in dealing with the hardware limitations, Kikuta tried to express in the music of Secret of Mana two "contrasting styles", namely himself and the game. The purpose of this was to create an original score which would be neither pop music nor standard game music.

Kikuta worked on the music for the two games mostly by himself, spending nearly 24 hours a day in his office, alternating between composing and editing to create an immersive three-dimensional sound. Rather than create MIDI versions of his compositions and rely on the sound engineers to create the sampled instruments (like most game music composers of the time), Kikuta made his own samples that matched the hardware capabilities of the Super NES so that he would know exactly how the pieces would sound on the system's hardware instead of having to deal with audio hardware differences between the original composition and the limited palette of the Super NES. The first track he composed as "The Child of the Fairy Tribe". Kikuta considers the score for Secret of Mana his favorite creation. His compositions for Secret of Mana and Trials of Mana were partly inspired by natural landscapes, as well as music from Bali. In addition to the soundtrack albums for the two games, in 1995, Kikuta released an experimental album of arranged music from the two installments, titled Secret of Mana +, which features one 50-minute-long track. Kikuta said in 2024 that he made the arranged album as a response to the stress of dealing with the restrictions of creating the original soundtrack, by instead creating something unrestrained and free.

=== Secret of Mana ===
Secret of Mana Original Soundtrack

Soundtrack album by Hiroki Kikuta
- Released: August 6, 1993; August 25, 1995; October 1, 2004
- Genre: Ambient, Breakbeat, Classical, Folk, Video game soundtrack
- Length: 1:06:01
- Label: NTT Publishing/Square; NTT Publishing (reprint)

Secret of Mana Original Soundtrack is a soundtrack album of music from Secret of Mana, released as Seiken Densetsu 2 Original Sound Version in Japan; the releases are identical aside from the packaging and localized English song titles. Secret of Mana was one of the first soundtrack releases in North America for the North American version of a game. The soundtrack was composed by Hiroki Kikuta. The soundtrack's music covers both "ominous" and "light-hearted" tracks, and is noted for its use of bells and "dark, solemn pianos". The title track to the game, "Fear of the Heavens", was designed by Kikuta to sync up with the title screen as it slowly faded in due to hardware limitations; at the time trying to match the audio and visual effects in a game was rare. Kikuta also started the track off with a "whale noise", rather than a traditional "ping", in order to try to "more deeply connect" the player with the game from the moment it started up; getting the sound to work with the memory limitations of the Super NES system was a difficult technical challenge. The album covers 44 tracks and has a duration of 1:06:01. It was published by NTT Publishing/Square on August 6, 1993, with the catalog number N25D-019, and reprinted by NTT Publishing on August 25, 1995, and October 1, 2004, with the catalog numbers PSCN-5030 and NTCP-5030. A remastered version of the soundtrack, also titled Secret of Mana Original Soundtrack, was released by Square Enix on February 21, 2018, to correspond with the 3D remake of the game. The remastered album contains 53 tracks across 3 discs and has a duration of over 3 hours.

The album was well received by reviewers such as Eve C. of RPGFan, who called it "a beautifully composed CD" and said that it was one of the best soundtracks of any Super NES game. She said that the largest complaint with the album was the synthetic quality of the music necessitated by the Super NES's sound hardware, though she noted that the music pushed the limits of the system's hardware further than any other Super NES game. Jason Walton of RPGFan agreed, saying that "the music is composed extremely well, full of variety", though he did not like that the tracks were kept short instead of looping in order to fit all of the songs on one disc. Damian Thomas, in his review of the North American version of the album, also noted that the music was impressive for a Super NES game, and recommended the album as worth hunting for. Gamasutra, in an interview with Kikuta, described the music of Secret of Mana as leaving "a lasting impression on international audiences". IGN named the title track as the seventh best RPG title track in a 2006 feature, calling it "soft" and "magical", and saying that Kikuta "uses a mix of upbeat pipes and tinkering piano keys to bring the world of Mana to life". In a Reddit AMA, Kikuta said the track "Ceremony" is based on Indonesian gamelan music.

Track list
No.	Title	Japanese title	Length
1.	"Angel's Fear"	天使の怖れ	1:42
2.	"A Curious Tale"	不思議なお話を	1:30
3.	"Rose and Spirit"	薔薇と精霊	1:27
4.	"Always Together"	いつもいっしょ	1:09
5.	"Kind Memories"	やさしい思いで	1:01
6.	"The Boy Heads for the Wilderness"	少年は荒野をめざす	1:56
7.	"Summer Sky Blue"	夏の空色	1:24
8.	"Dancing Beasts"	踊るけものたち	1:19
9.	"Distant Thunder"	遠雷	1:49
10.	"The Child of the Fairy Tribe"	妖精族の子供	0:51
11.	"Occurrence of a Moonlit Night"	月夜の出来事	0:47
12.	"Heart of Darkness"	闇の奥	1:04
13.	"The Holy Invasion"	聖なる侵入	0:59
14.	"Secret of the Hot Sands"	熱砂の秘密	1:11
15.	"What the Forest Taught Me"	森が教えてくれたこと	1:03
16.	"A Wish"	ねがい	1:03
17.	"Soul of the Night"	夜の魂	1:47
18.	"Did You See the Sea?"	君は海を見たか	2:09
19.	"Crisis"	危機	2:12
20.	"Orphans of the Storm"	嵐の孤児	2:03
21.	"Where the Wind Ends"	風の焉わるところ	1:13
22.	"Flight into the Unknown"	未知への飛行	1:30
23.	"Eternal Recurrence"	永劫回帰	2:12
24.	"The Legend"	伝説	1:43
25.	"The Eight Strokes of the Bell"	八点鐘	1:00
26.	"A Strange Incident"	奇妙な事件	1:06
27.	"The King of the Coast"	海辺の王様	1:37
28.	"The Dark Star"	暗黒星	1:33
29.	"Premonition"	予感	1:12
30.	"Steel and Traps"	鋼鉄と罠	1:43
31.	"Prayer and Whisper"	祈りと囁き	1:10
32.	"Ceremony"	儀式	1:27
33.	"Reaching Tomorrow"	明日にとどく	1:06
34.	"Time Enough for Love"	愛に時間を	1:26
35.	"Pure Night"	浄夜	2:50
36.	"The Curse"	たたり	1:20
37.	"The Sorcerer"	呪術師	1:48
38.	"A Conclusion"	ある結末	1:08
39.	"I Won't Forget You"	君を忘れない	1:11
40.	"This One is Hope"	そのひとつは希望	1:08
41.	"Meridian Festival"	子午線の祀り	2:19
42.	"Wings Flapping No Longer"	翼はもうはばたかない	2:01
43.	"The Penultimate Truth"	最後から2番目の真実	2:47
44.	"I Closed My Eyes"	ひとみを閉じて	0:32

=== Trials of Mana ===
Seiken Densetsu 3 Original Sound Version

Soundtrack album by Hiroki Kikuta
- Released: August 25, 1995; October 1, 2004
- Genre: Ambient, Breakbeat, Classical, Video game soundtrack
- Length: 3:19:21
- Label: NTT Publishing/Square; Square Enix (reprint)

Seiken Densetsu 3 Original Sound Version is a soundtrack album of music from Trials of Mana. The soundtrack was composed by Hiroki Kikuta. Kikuta completed it primarily by himself, doing the sound selection, editing, effect design, and data encoding. He was assisted by a sound programmer, Hidenori Suzuki, which along with his experience from the previous game allowed him to compose over three times the amount of music he had created for Secret of Mana. Kikuta decided to take the music in a "different direction" than Secret of Mana's, as he did not think he could surpass it with the same concept, and tried to create a mix of multiple simultaneous instruments using the six sound channels of the Super NES. The music has been described as ranging from "bouncy" and "energetic" to "flowing" and "serene". The soundtrack features 60 tracks on 3 discs and spans a duration of 3:19:21. The album was published by NTT Publishing on August 25, 1995, with the catalog numbers PSCN-5026~8 and republished by Square Enix on October 1, 2004, with the catalog numbers NTCP-5026~8. The main theme from Secret of Mana, "Where Angels Fear to Tread", called "Fear of the Heavens" there, makes a return in this installment.

Freddie W. of RPGFan, in his review of the album, named it as "one of the high points of Hiroki Kikuta's work on the series". He described it as having a very cohesive "feel", and as being a "more refined and matured" version of the "feeling" of the Secret of Mana soundtrack. Square Enix Music Online's review agreed with the quality of the music, calling it "among the finest ever heard on the Super Nintendo". They also termed it "in many ways superior to the score of Seiken Densetsu 2", which they described as having been an "instant winner" due to the work of Kikuta.

Track list

Disc 1
No.	Title	Length
1.	"Not Awaken"	0:09
2.	"Where Angels Fear To Tread"	2:45
3.	"Ordinary People"	2:26
4.	"Whiz Kid"	4:14
5.	"Walls And Steels"	3:01
6.	"Axe Brings Storm"	3:28
7.	"Little Sweet Cafe"	3:08
8.	"Witchmakers"	2:37
9.	"Another Winter"	3:36
10.	"Ancient Dolphin"	3:55
11.	"Hope Isolation Pray"	3:21
12.	"Raven"	3:42
13.	"Damn Damn Drum"	2:49
14.	"Innocent Sea"	2:43
15.	"Swivel"	1:51
16.	"Oh I'm A Flamelet"	3:12
17.	"Evening Star"	3:39
18.	"Don't Hunt The Fairy"	2:40
19.	"Fable"	3:42

Disc 2
No.	Title	Length
1.	"Lefthanded Wolf"	2:57
2.	"Person's Die"	3:16
3.	"Harvest November"	4:19
4.	"Few Paths Forbidden"	3:14
5.	"Female Turbulence"	4:10
6.	"Intolerance"	3:33
7.	"Different Road"	3:10
8.	"Powell"	4:16
9.	"Political Pressure"	4:31
10.	"Nuclear Fusion"	3:17
11.	"Positive"	0:54
12.	"Meridian Child"	3:12
13.	"Closed Garden"	0:52
14.	"Splash Hop"	2:28
15.	"Innocent Water"	3:31
16.	"Delicate Affection"	2:12
17.	"Three Of Darkside"	3:12
18.	"Last Audience"	3:02
19.	"Obsession"	3:41
20.	"Strange Medicine"	2:44
21.	"Frenzy"	3:07

Disc 3
No.	Title	Length
1.	"Can You Fly Sister?"	3:43
2.	"Decision Bell"	3:23
3.	"Secret Of Mana"	3:32
4.	"Faith Total Machine"	2:55
5.	"Weird Conterpoint"	3:46
6.	"Rolling Cradle"	3:45
7.	"Black Soup"	3:36
8.	"Hightension Wire"	3:21
9.	"And Other"	0:31
10.	"Electric Talk"	4:01
11.	"Religion Thunder"	3:09
12.	"Angel's Fear"	4:15
13.	"Sacrifice Part One"	3:35
14.	"Sacrifice Part Two"	4:10
15.	"Sacrifice Part Three"	8:05
16.	"Reincarnation"	3:09
17.	"Farewell Song"	2:39
18.	"Breezin"	5:11
19.	"Return To Forever"	8:39
20.	"Long Goodbye"	1:20

=== Secret of Mana+ ===
Secret of Mana+

Soundtrack album by Hiroki Kikuta
- Released: October 29, 1993; October 25, 1995; October 1, 2004
- Genre: Ambient, Big beat, Classical, Video game soundtrack
- Length: 49:28
- Label: NTT Publishing/Square; Square Enix (reprint)

Secret of Mana+ is an arranged album of music from Secret of Mana and Trials of Mana. The music was composed and arranged by Hiroki Kikuta. The album is composed of a single track titled "Secret of Mana" that has a duration of 49:28. This track incorporates themes from the music of Secret as well as a few themes from Trials, which was still under development at the time. The style of the album is described as "experimental", using "strange sounds" such as waterfalls, bird calls, cell phone sounds, and "typing" sounds. The music has also been described as covering many different musical styles, such as "Debussian impressionist styles, his own heavy electronic and synth ideas, and even ideas of popular musicians". It was published by NTT Publishing/Square on October 29, 1993, with the catalog number N30D-021, and reprinted by NTT Publishing on August 25, 1995, and October 1, 2004, with the catalog numbers PSCN-5031 and NTCP-5031.

Daniel Kalabakov, in his review for RPGFan, said that while popular opinion of the album was split between those who liked and extremely disliked the album, he personally "loved" it. He praised it for being an "unorthodox arrangement" and trying something new rather than being merely a piano or orchestral arranged album, the most common types. Chris Greening of Square Enix Music Online had similar feelings about the album, praising the wide range of styles and sounds and calling it an "unparalleled achievement". Simon of Square Enix Music Online added that it was "refreshing to see there is no compromise" between Kikuta's artistic vision and more traditional commercial styles.

== Legend of Mana ==
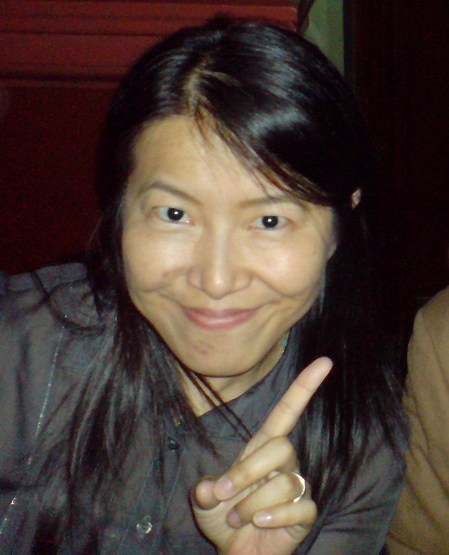
Legend of Mana and Heroes of Mana composer Yoko Shimomura

Legend of Mana, released for the PlayStation in 1999, features music composed by Yoko Shimomura. She had previously composed for several Square games including Live A Live and Parasite Eve and had originally joined Square for the purpose of composing music for fantasy role-playing games. She was initially hesitant to compose for the Mana series, as she felt that it was so associated with the music of Ito and Kikuta. In 2002, Shimomura said that of all her compositions to date, she considered the soundtrack to Legend the one that best expresses herself. Shimomura claims that she prefers "passionate music that comes from the heart", and that she has to "feel the emotions of a piece in the extreme before I am able to write" the music by putting herself in the same mood as the piece is supposed to be in. Legend of Mana featured the first vocal track of any Mana game, "Song of Mana", which also serves as the game's opening theme. It was sung by Swedish vocalist and then-Rednex group member Annika Ljungberg, who was chosen by Shimomura because she "wanted to stay away from working with someone popular that everyone already knows". After hearing a sample of Annika's music, she flew to Sweden "straight away" to do an analog recording of the song. Four of the game's tracks were released as part of Drammatica: The Very Best Works of Yoko Shimomura, an arranged album highlighting the composer's work: "Legend of MANA ~Title Theme~", "Hometown Domina", "Colored Earth", and "Bejeweled City Ruined". Shimomura carefully chose the songs to be included on the album based on their apparent popularity among fans and how suitable they are for orchestra. In addition to the soundtrack album, a promotional album of music from Legend of Mana was produced and was included with preorders of the game in North America.

=== Original Soundtrack ===
Seiken Densetsu / Legend of Mana Original Soundtrack

Soundtrack album by Yoko Shimomura
- Released: July 23, 1999; October 20, 2004
- Genre: Ambient, Breakbeat, Classical, Electronic, Pop, Rock, Video game soundtrack
- Length: 2:10:37
- Label: DigiCube; Square Enix (reprint)

Seiken Densetsu / Legend of Mana Original Soundtrack is a soundtrack album of music from Legend of Mana, composed by Yoko Shimomura. The soundtrack features 55 tracks on 2 discs and spans a duration of 2:10:37. It includes "Song of Mana", sung by Swedish vocalist Annika Ljungberg. The song was later made available on the Square Vocal Collection album in 2001. The music covers many styles including piano, hard rock, and techno. The soundtrack was published by DigiCube on July 23, 1999, with the catalog number SSCX-10034, and reprinted by Square Enix on October 20, 2004, with the catalog numbers SQEX-10036~7.

The album reached #65 on the Japan Oricon charts and stayed there for two weeks. Patrick Gann of RPGFan heavily praised it, and cited the "town" themes as Shimomura's weakest, but said that the more "emotional" pieces were much better. Gann also noted Ljungberg as an "amazing" vocalist. RPGamer's review of the album was also praising, calling the composition "excellent", the sound quality "superb", and that it kept the "atmosphere" of previous Mana game soundtracks.

Track list

Disc 1
No.	Title	Japanese title	Length
1.	"Legend of MANA ~Title Theme~"	Legend of MANA ~Title Theme~	2:24
2.	"Nostalgic Song"	懐かしき歌	3:32
3.	"World of Mana"	World of Mana	5:06
4.	"Song of MANA ~Opening Theme~"	Song of MANA ~Opening Theme~	2:49
5.	"Places of Soul"	心のある場所	1:32
6.	"Hometown Domina"	ホームタウン ドミナ	2:44
7.	"Daedal's Organ"	ディドルのオルガン	0:55
8.	"Wanderer's Path"	旅人たちの道	4:32
9.	"Pain the Universe"	Pain the Universe	3:22
10.	"Cliff Town Gato"	断崖の町 ガト	2:52
11.	"Earth Painting"	彩りの大地	4:26
12.	"Marginal Beast"	Marginal Beast	1:37
13.	"Moonlit City Roa"	月夜の町 ロア	2:11
14.	"Everyday Dream ~Spirit's Song~"	夢想う遠き日々 ~セイレーンの歌~	2:31
15.	"To the Sea"	海へ	2:46
16.	"Southern City Polpota"	港町 ポルボタ	2:24
17.	"Everyday Dream"	夢想う遠き日々…	1:27
18.	"Calmly Travelling"	悠然なる歴世	1:50
19.	"Bedight Orbit"	Bedight Orbit	3:36
20.	"The Wind sings of a Journey"	風歌う，その旅路	2:00
21.	"Mystic City Geo"	魔法都市 ジオ	2:36
22.	"Memory of Running"	駆け行く記憶	2:02
23.	"The Darkness Nova"	The Darkness Nova	4:21

Disc 2
No.	Title	Japanese title	Length
1.	"Pastoral"	パストラール	1:44
2.	"Ranch Night"	牧場にて	1:14
3.	"Maker's Gallop"	Maker's Gallop	1:08
4.	"Dreamseed Fruit"	夢見る果実	1:17
5.	"A good Thing!"	いいことあるよ	0:06
6.	"Play the Organ!"	オルガンを弾こう！	0:13
7.	"Play the Organ! Part 2"	オルガンを弾こう！その２	0:17
8.	"Nocturne"	夜想曲	0:39
9.	"Digger's Song ~Underground Path Song~"	Digger's Song ~穴掘り団の歌~	0:55
10.	"Calm Song"	穏やかな曲	0:36
11.	"Sorrowful Song"	悲しい曲	0:30
12.	"Joyful Song"	楽しい曲	0:29
13.	"Mysterious Song"	不思議な曲	0:42
14.	"Missing Truth"	真実の行方	3:06
15.	"The Excitement of both of us ~Lucemia~"	二つの思惑 ~ルシェイメア~	3:49
16.	"Irwin on Reflection"	Irwin on Reflection	2:53
17.	"The other Truth"	真実の彼方	2:17
18.	"Complicated Destiny"	重なりゆく運命	3:51
19.	"Bonded by the Soul"	賜わりし絆へ	1:53
20.	"Aid"	焔城	2:37
21.	"Leading into Prosperity"	真紅なる竜帝	2:08
22.	"The one who waits for the Breath of Destiny"	運命の先に待つもの	3:07
23.	"Depression Blues"	蒼い憂鬱	2:35
24.	"Gem Thief Sandra's Plight!"	宝石泥棒サンドラ参上！	0:44
25.	"City of flickering Destruction"	滅びし煌めきの都市	3:23
26.	"Foolish Decision"	愚かなる宝愛	3:40
27.	"Those who are shining"	涙色した輝きの…	3:06
28.	"The great Virtue of Gathering Mana's Spirit ~Theme of Mana~"	想いは遠くマナの樹に寄せて ~Theme of Mana~	2:13
29.	"Holy Power of Mana"	マナの聖域	3:32
30.	"Silence of Time"	蒼范の時	3:32
31.	"Nostalgic Song ~Ending Theme for Mana's Story~"	Nostalgic Song ~Ending Theme for Mana's Story~	1:33
32.	"Song of MANA ~Ending Theme~"	Song of MANA ~Ending Theme~	5:59

=== Music Selection ===
Legend of Mana Music Selection

Soundtrack album by Yoko Shimomura
- Released: June 1, 2000
- Genre: Video game soundtrack
- Length: 18:34
- Label: Square

Legend of Mana Music Selection is a promotional album of music from Legend of Mana included in preorders of the game in North America. The music was composed by Yoko Shimomura. The soundtrack features five tracks and spans a duration of 18:34. It was published by Square on June 1, 2000, with the catalog number 3TP-0012K.

Track list
No.	Title	Length
1.	"Legend of Mana (Title Theme)"	2:25
2.	"An Old Song"	3:32
3.	"World of Mana"	5:06
4.	"A Place with Heart"	1:32
5.	"Song of Mana (Ending Theme)"	5:59

=== Seiken Densetsu / Legend of Mana Arrangement Album: Promise ===
Seiken Densetsu / Legend of Mana Arrangement Album: Promise

Soundtrack album by Yoko Shimomura
- Released: September 30, 2015
- Genre: Video game soundtrack
- Length: 56:23
- Label: Square Enix

Seiken Densetsu / Legend of Mana Arrangement Album: Promise is an album of arranged music from Legend of Mana, composed by Yoko Shimomura and arranged by Takuro Iga, Mitsuhiro Ohta, Taroma Koshida, Jun Hayakawa, and Tango-jack. The soundtrack features 12 tracks and spans a duration of 56:23. The arrangements have been described as "ranging from jazz to what can be best described as 'café' style", with one track, "Seven Shades of Life - Bejeweled City in Ruins", featuring a choral performance. The album was published by Square Enix on September 30, 2015, with the catalog number SQEX-10510.

Samer Farag of RPGFan enjoyed the album, calling it a "smooth experience". They recommended it for "easy listening while studying or working", even if the listener had not played the original game.

Track list
No.	Title	Japanese title	Length
1.	"Hometown of Domina"	ホームタウン ドミナ	4:10
2.	"To the Sea"	海へ	3:49
3.	"Polpota Harbor"	港町 ポルポタ	4:16
4.	"Legend of MANA"	Legend of MANA	4:51
5.	"Picturesque Landscape"	彩りの大地	4:11
6.	"Traveler's Road"	旅人たちの道	4:26
7.	"Singing Wind, Journey's Path"	風歌う, その旅路	4:18
8.	"Tango Appassionata - As the Heart Wills"	Tango Appassionata ～その心のままに～	6:24
9.	"Such Cruel Fate"	運命はかくも残酷に	5:19
10.	"Seven Shades of Life - Bejeweled City in Ruins"	Seven Shades of Life ～滅びし煌きの都市～	5:22
11.	"Nostalgic Song Reprise - Finale"	Nostalgic Song	4:27
12.	"Song of MANA"	Song of MANA	4:50

== World of Mana ==
In 2005, Square Enix announced plans for World of Mana, a new series of titles in the Mana franchise, whose titles would span more video game genres than the original series. Koichi Ishii, the creator of the Mana series, decided even before he worked on 2002's Final Fantasy XI about creating new Mana games, but first wanted to create a goal for the new series, and eventually decided to make it about exploring how to add "the feeling of touch" to a game. After he saw the game Half-Life 2 at E3 in 2003, he felt that its physics engine was the one he needed. World of Mana went on to comprise four new games in addition to the remake of Final Fantasy Adventure; Koichi Ishii served as director or producer for all of them as he had for the previous games in the series. In 2006, a Mana installment for the Wii was considered but did not enter development. In April 2007, a month after the release of the final game of the World of Mana, Ishii left Square Enix to lead his own development company, named Grezzo; no further games in the series have been announced since.

=== Children of Mana ===
Seiken Densetsu DS: Children of Mana Original Soundtrack

Soundtrack album by Kenji Ito, Masaharu Iwata, Takayuki Aihara
- Released: May 9, 2006
- Genre: Video game soundtrack
- Length: 1:24:13
- Label: Square Enix

Seiken Densetsu DS: Children of Mana Original Soundtrack is a soundtrack album of music from Children of Mana, known as Seiken Densetsu DS: Children of Mana in Japan. The soundtrack was composed by Kenji Ito, Masaharu Iwata, and Takayuki Aihara, and covers a range of musical styles including rock and roll, jazz, and classical orchestra. Ito served as the lead composer. The instruments themselves, however, due to the limitations of the Nintendo DS hardware, have been described as not being "especially aesthetic or realistic". The soundtrack features 33 tracks on 2 discs and spans a duration of 1:24:13. It was published by Square Enix on May 9, 2006, on the Japanese iTunes Store, but has not been released as a physical album.

Chris Greening of Square Enix Music Online, in his review of the album, reacted positively to the score, calling it a "colourful, diverse, and rich experience overall". He called the tracks by Iwata and Aikara the "core" of the album, saying that the tracks by Ito felt "banal" and "formulaic" which he attributed to Ito being too overworked to focus on the album. RPGamer, in their review of the game, called the music "pretty nice". They noted that the music did not stand out as much as the visuals of the game, though they still "conveyed the theme", and that the "town" tracks were in their opinion weaker than the rest of the soundtrack.

Track list

Disc 1
No.	Title	Music	Japanese title	Length
1.	"Breath of MANA -for the Glory-"	Kenji Ito	Breath of MANA -for the Glory-	1:44
2.	"Rising Sun"	Ito	Rising Sun	2:17
3.	"The Ensemble of Children"	Masaharu Iwata	小人の合奏	1:14
4.	"Tale of the Distant Sun"	Ito	遠い日の物語	2:43
5.	"Longing"	Ito	憧憬	2:28
6.	"Creeping Pulsation"	Iwata	しのびよる鼓動	2:58
7.	"Emergency"	Takayuki Aihara	危急	1:41
8.	"Beyond the Blue Sky"	Ito	蒼い空の向こう	2:24
9.	"Tower of the Flickering Prayer"	Iwata	ゆらめく祈りの塔	2:28
10.	"Peaceful Underground Lake"	Iwata	静かなる地底湖	2:45
11.	"Storm of the Red Sand"	Iwata	赤砂の嵐	3:29
12.	"Frozen Mystery"	Iwata	凍りついた栄華	3:06
13.	"Monster of the Forest"	Aihara	かまいたちの森	3:24
14.	"The Wings Sings Loudly"	Aihara	高らかに風がうたう	3:24
15.	"King of Chaos"	Aihara	混沌の王	2:57
16.	"The Blockage Menace"	Ito	立ち塞がる脅威	1:29
17.	"Evil Beast"	Iwata	凶なる獣	2:19
18.	"Triumphant Return"	Ito	凱旋	0:48
19.	"The Desire Vanishes"	Ito	消えゆく願い	0:13

Disc 2
No.	Title	Music	Japanese title	Length
1.	"Together with Comrade-in-Arms"	Aihara	戦友とともに	1:24
2.	"Singing Voice of Light"	Iwata	光の歌声	2:53
3.	"Challenge"	Ito	挑戦	1:33
4.	"The Ruined Ground"	Aihara	滅びの大地	3:03
5.	"Fate"	Aihara	宿命	3:32
6.	"Rut of the Crystal"	Aihara	水晶の轍	4:06
7.	"The Shaking Earth"	Iwata	震える大地	1:38
8.	"The Sky's Lamentation"	Aihara	慟哭の空	2:29
9.	"Grasslands of Eternity"	Ito	悠久の草原	2:19
10.	"Trial"	Aihara	試練	3:13
11.	"The Thunder Emperor's Aloofness"	Ito	孤高の雷帝	2:41
12.	"Infant of Mana"	Ito	マナの嬰児	4:03
13.	"The Desire Not Forgotten"	Ito	忘れえぬ想い	2:42
14.	"The Beginning of a New Legend"	Ito	新たな物語のはじまり	4:46

=== Dawn of Mana ===
Seiken Densetsu 4 Original Soundtrack -Sanctuary-

Soundtrack album by Kenji Ito, Tsuyoshi Sekito, Masayoshi Soken, Hiroki Kikuta, Yoko Shimomura, Ryuichi Sakamoto
- Released: January 24, 2007
- Genre: Video game soundtrack
- Length: 4:19:41
- Label: Square Enix

Seiken Densetsu 4 Original Soundtrack -Sanctuary- is a soundtrack album of music from Dawn of Mana, known as Seiken Densetsu 4 in Japan. The soundtrack was composed by Kenji Ito, Tsuyoshi Sekito, Masayoshi Soken, Hiroki Kikuta, Yoko Shimomura, and Ryuichi Sakamoto, with many of the tracks composed by one artist arranged by another. The styles portrayed on the soundtrack cover "soft, heartwarming tunes", fast-paced "rock and roll style" tracks, and "dark and dramatic tunes", while the arranged songs that appear on the fourth disc of the soundtrack album are split between orchestral and rock and roll styles. The theme song to the game, "Dawn of Mana", was composed by Grammy-winning composer Ryuichi Sakamoto, and was inspired by the image of the Mana tree shown at the title screen. The composition of the soundtrack was done under a great deal of time pressure; Soken has said that he composed 32 tracks in 52 days at a breakneck pace, and Sekito has said that Ito conducted the orchestral recordings while ill to make the deadline. The soundtrack features 106 tracks on 4 discs and spans a duration of 4:19:41. It was published by Square Enix on January 24, 2007, with the catalog numbers SQEX-10083~6.

Dennis Rubinshteyn of RPGFan was pleased by the soundtrack, saying that the music met his high expectations for what he called the "only redeeming quality left" to the series since Legend of Mana. Summing the album up as a "solid soundtrack with great songs and a lot of variety", he named Sekito's tracks as the least appealing on the soundtrack, causing some parts of the album as a whole to be "hit or miss". Bryan Matheny of Square Enix Music Online held the opposite opinion, calling Sekito's pieces what "made this work bearable" and saying that he "just can't get into this soundtrack", especially the first three discs, which were full of "boring and underdeveloped" tracks. Chris Greening of Square Enix Music Online's review, however, was more in line with RPGFan's, wherein he praised the "diversity" and "glorious spectrum of emotion" found in the soundtrack. He cited the synthesizer operation as a weak point as well as the order of the tracks, and singled out Sekito's tracks as "forgettable" and "repetitive".

Track list

Disc 1
No.	Title	Music	Japanese title	Length
1.	"Dawn of Mana - opening theme"	Ryuichi Sakamoto	Dawn of Mana - opening theme	4:55
2.	"Prologue ~Mana, the Earth and the Spirits~"	Kenji Ito	プロローグ -マナと大地と精霊と-	2:46
3.	"Rising Sun"	Ito	Rising Sun	2:32
4.	"Mana's Tale"	Ito	Mana's Tale	2:33
5.	"Pastoral Melody"	Ito	パストラル・メロディ	2:10
6.	"Pack of Ice Wolves Ver.1"	Tsuyoshi Sekito	氷狼の群れ Ver.1	2:09
7.	"The Beast God's Labyrinth"	Sekito	神獣の迷宮	0:56
8.	"A Silent Drop"	Ito	静寂の雫	2:41
9.	"Seed of the Giant Tree"	Sekito	大樹の種子	2:25
10.	"Dark Shrine"	Ito	Dark Shrine	2:50
11.	"Emerald Shine"	Sekito	エメラルド・シャイン	2:31
12.	"Burning Spirits"	Ito, arranged by Sekito and Ito	Burning Spirits	4:24
13.	"Echo of Darkness Ver.1"	Sekito	闇のこだま Ver.1	2:15
14.	"Unknown Light"	Ito	未知なる光	0:38
15.	"Stroud Ver.1"	Sekito	ストラウド Ver.1	2:53
16.	"Pack of Ice Wolves Ver.2"	Sekito	氷狼の群れ Ver.2	1:32
17.	"Reminiscence"	Ito	追憶	3:13
18.	"A Mysterious Forest"	Ito	A Mysterious Forest	3:00
19.	"Shadow of Vine"	Sekito	シャドウ・オブ・バイン	4:20
20.	"Feelings Not Forgotten"	Ito	忘れえぬ想い	2:58
21.	"Mask of Corruption"	Ito	背徳の仮面	1:05
22.	"A Lost Hope"	Ito	失われた希望	1:01
23.	"Goblin's Beat"	Ito	Goblin's Beat	2:35
24.	"The Lost Ones Tremble"	Ito	揺るがなきもの	2:24
25.	"Green Whirlpool"	Ito	緑の渦	3:23
26.	"Red Wyvern"	Sekito	レッド・ワイバーン	3:56
27.	"Stroud Ver.2"	Sekito	ストラウド Ver.2	1:05
28.	"Guardian Holy Beast Flammie Ver.1"	Hiroki Kikuta, arranged by Sekito	守護聖獣フラミー Ver.1	0:58
29.	"Guardian Holy Beast Flammie Ver.2"	Kikuta, arranged by Sekito	守護聖獣フラミー Ver.2	1:02

Disc 2
No.	Title	Music	Japanese title	Length
1.	"The Deep Blue"	Ito	深き碧	3:28
2.	"Seeking the Light"	Ito	光をもとめて	3:54
3.	"Evil Memories"	Ito	凶なる記憶	1:03
4.	"Blood Feud"	Sekito	血闘	4:10
5.	"Impact of the Darkness"	Sekito	闇の衝撃	2:40
6.	"A Terrible Premonition"	Sekito	戦慄の予感	1:24
7.	"Pack of Ice Wolves II"	Sekito	氷狼の群れ ＩＩ	4:13
8.	"Echo of Darkness Ver.2"	Sekito	闇のこだま Ver.2	2:23
9.	"The Dark Crystal"	Sekito	闇の結晶	0:52
10.	"Stroud Ver.3"	Sekito	ストラウド Ver.3	2:40
11.	"Karen"	Ito	Karen	0:35
12.	"A Prelude to Despair"	Ito	絶望への序曲	0:56
13.	"Rondo of Sand"	Ito	砂の輪舞曲	3:37
14.	"The Peak of Twilight"	Ito	黄昏の頂	4:00
15.	"Death Sally Battle"	Sekito	デスサリー・バトル	5:13
16.	"Compensation of Fate"	Ito	運命の代償	2:05
17.	"Grief and Hope"	Sekito	悲しみと希望	0:34
18.	"An Unbreakable Heart"	Ito	折れない心	1:39
19.	"A Wandering Heart"	Ito	さまよう心	0:33
20.	"Temptation"	Ito	誘惑	3:17
21.	"Old and Distant Memories"	Ito	遠き古の記憶	3:25
22.	"No Turning Back"	Ito	還らざる道	3:07
23.	"The Fool's Dance"	Ito	愚者の舞	3:22
24.	"The Truth Behind the Mask"	Ito	仮面の下の真実	2:50
25.	"Renewed Determination"	Ito	新たな決意	0:32

Disc 3
No.	Title	Music	Japanese title	Length
1.	"Roar of the Iron Clump"	Ito	鉄塊の轟き	2:42
2.	"To Where Mana Exists"	Ito	マナのもとへ	2:39
3.	"Skyrocket to Victory"	Sekito	勝利の狼煙	0:31
4.	"Endless Melee"	Ito	果て無き攻防	2:22
5.	"Godless Golem"	Sekito	ゴッドレス・ゴーレム	6:06
6.	"Pack of Ice Wolves Ver.3"	Sekito	氷狼の群れ Ver.3	0:53
7.	"Desperate Line"	Kikuta, arranged by Sekito	決死行	1:25
8.	"Dark Palace"	Sekito	冥王城	4:32
9.	"Dark King"	Sekito	冥王	6:06
10.	"Desperate Fight"	Sekito	死闘	5:58
11.	"Echo of Darkness Ver.3"	Sekito	闇のこだま Ver.3	2:06
12.	"Den of Thieves"	Sekito	魔窟	4:02
13.	"The Stage of Ruin"	Ito	滅びの舞台	2:06
14.	"Illusions"	Ito	幻夢	2:43
15.	"The Final Decisive Battle"	Ito	最後の決戦	3:06
16.	"Eternal Parting"	Ito	永遠の別れ	5:09
17.	"Birth of the Goddess ~The Beginning of a New World~"	Ito	女神誕生 ～新たな世界の始まり～	2:17
18.	"The Endless Dream"	Ito	終わりなき愛	5:18
19.	"A Legend Forever"	Ito	伝説よ永遠に	2:57
20.	"Epilogue ~The Continuing Future~"	Ito	エピローグ ～続いてゆく未来～	1:25
21.	"Traces"	Ito	おもかげ	0:21

Disc 4
No.	Title	Music	Japanese title	Length
1.	"Pop, pop, pop"	Ito	Pop, pop, pop	1:27
2.	"March, march, march"	Ito	March, march, march	3:36
3.	"Rush, rush, rush"	Ito	Rush, rush, rush	2:37
4.	"Shout, shout, shout"	Ito	Shout, shout, shout	1:53
5.	"Endless Battlefield -SK4 Ver.-"	Ito, arranged by Junya Nakano	果てしなき戦場 -SK4 Ver.-	2:05
6.	"Eternal Plains -SK4 Ver.-"	Ito, arranged by Junya Nakano	悠久の草原 -SK4 Ver.-	2:25
7.	"The Child of the Sprite Tribe -SK4 Ver.-"	Kikuta, arranged by Masayoshi Soken	妖精族のこども -SK4 Ver.-	3:04
8.	"Splash Hop -SK4 Ver.-"	Kikuta, arranged by Nakano	Splash Hop -SK4 Ver.-	2:34
9.	"Weird Counterpoint -SK4 Ver.-"	Kikuta, arranged by Nakano	Weird Counterpoint -SK4 Ver.-	4:53
10.	"Don't Hunt The Fairy -SK4 Ver.-"	Kikuta, arranged by Soken	Don't Hunt The Fairy -SK4 Ver.-	2:47
11.	"Meridian Worship -SK4 Ver.-"	Kikuta, arranged by Soken	子午線の祀り -SK4 Ver.-	3:59
12.	"The Darkness Nova -SK4 Ver.-"	Yoko Shimomura, arranged by Soken	The Darkness Nova -SK4 Ver.-	4:28
13.	"Dwarves' Theme -SK4 Ver.-"	Ito, arranged by Hirosato Noda	ドワーフのテーマ -SK4 Ver.-	1:56
14.	"Irwin On Reflection -SK4 Ver.-"	Shimomura, arranged by Soken	Irwin On Reflection -SK4 Ver.-	4:32
15.	"Endless Battlefield -Hurry Up Ver.-"	Ito	果てしなき戦場 -Hurry Up Ver.-	1:38
16.	"Eternal Plains -Hurry Up Ver.-"	Ito	悠久の草原 -Hurry Up Ver.-	1:24
17.	"The Child of the Sprite Tribe -Hurry Up Ver.-"	Kikuta, arranged by Soken	妖精族のこども -Hurry Up Ver.-	1:20
18.	"Splash Hop -Hurry Up Ver.-"	Kikuta, arranged by Soken	Splash Hop -Hurry Up Ver.-	1:08
19.	"Weird Counterpoint -Hurry Up Ver.-"	Kikuta, arranged by Soken	Weird Counterpoint -Hurry Up Ver.-	1:19
20.	"Don't Hunt The Fairy -Hurry Up Ver.-"	Kikuta, arranged by Soken	Don't Hunt The Fairy -Hurry Up Ver.-	1:13
21.	"Meridian Worship -Hurry Up Ver.-"	Kikuta, arranged by Soken	子午線の祀り -Hurry Up Ver.-	1:20
22.	"The Darkness Nova -Hurry Up Ver.-"	Shimomura, arranged by Soken	The Darkness Nova -Hurry Up Ver.-	1:36
23.	"Dwarves' Theme -Hurry Up Ver.-"	Ito, arranged by Noda	ドワーフのテーマ -Hurry Up Ver.-	1:44
24.	"Irwin On Reflection -Hurry Up Ver.-"	Shimomura, arranged by Soken	Irwin On Reflection -Hurry Up Ver.-	2:04
25.	"Gentle Eyelids"	Masayoshi Soken	やさしい瞼	1:26
26.	"Morning Light Horn"	Soken	曙光のホルン	1:44
27.	"Stand on the Front Lines"	Soken	前線に立て	0:09
28.	"Hurry Up!"	Soken	Hurry Up!	0:07
29.	"Yes! That's Far Enough!"	Soken	はい!そこまで!	0:08
30.	"Challenge Arena Fanfare"	Soken	チャレンジアリーナ・ファンファーレ	0:10
31.	"A Big Victory"	Soken	大勝利	0:29

=== Breath of Mana ===
Breath of Mana

Soundtrack album by Kenji Ito
- Released: December 21, 2006
- Genre: Video game soundtrack
- Length: 13:41
- Label: Square Enix

Breath of Mana is a promotional album of music from Dawn of Mana included with preorders of the game in Japan. Despite the many composers of the full soundtrack, the five songs on Breath were all composed and arranged by Kenji Ito. Three of the songs, "Breath of MANA", "Unforgotten Memories", and "Rising Sun (piano solo ver.)", did not appear on the full soundtrack album. The songs on the disc are "gentle melodies" using orchestra and piano. The five songs cover a duration of 13:41. The disc was published by Square Enix on December 21, 2006. A review of the album by Dennis Rubinshteyn of RPGFan called it a "good showcase" of the strengths of the full album, which were in his opinion the tracks by Ito. He felt that the tracks on the single were "superb", and said that it was a shame that two of the tracks were not found on the soundtrack album.

Track list
No.	Title	Japanese title	Length
1.	"Breath of MANA"	Breath of MANA	1:19
2.	"Prologue ~Mana, the Earth and the Spirits~"	プロローグ -マナと大地と精霊と-	2:44
3.	"Feelings Not Forgotten"	忘れえぬ想い	2:58
4.	"Burning Spirits"	Burning Spirits	4:24
5.	"Rising Sun (piano solo ver.)"	Rising Sun (piano solo ver.)	2:15

=== Heroes of Mana ===
Seiken Densetsu: Heroes of Mana Original Soundtrack

Soundtrack album by Yoko Shimomura
- Released: April 18, 2007
- Genre: Video game soundtrack
- Length: 2:24:28
- Label: Square Enix

Seiken Densetsu: Heroes of Mana Original Soundtrack is a soundtrack album of music from Heroes of Mana, known as Seiken Densetsu: Heroes of Mana in Japan. The soundtrack was composed by Yoko Shimomura. The musical style of the tracks is primarily orchestral, with the addition of a strong piano and drums that sometimes verge on a more tribal rhythm. The soundtrack features 49 tracks on 2 discs and spans a duration of 2:24:28. Three of the game's tracks were released as part of Drammatica: The Very Best Works of Yoko Shimomura, an arranged album highlighting the composer's work: "To the Heroes of Old ~Opening Theme from Heroes of Mana~", "The Way the Heart Is" (as "Tango Appassionata"), and "The Tale Told by the Wind ~Ending Theme from Heroes of Mana~". Shimomura carefully chose the songs to be included on the album based on their apparent popularity among fans and how suitable they are for orchestra. The Heroes of Mana soundtrack was published by Square Enix on April 18, 2007, with the catalog numbers SQEX-10095~6.

Denis Rubinshteyn, in his review of the album, said that while the game itself was poor, "the music is a treat". Calling the music "solid" and "enjoyable", he highlighted Shimomura's use of drums and variations on themes as particularly worthy of praise. Don Kotowski of Square Enix Music Online agreed, saying that Square Enix "made the right decision" in asking Shimomura to compose the soundtrack, as she was able to "capture the spirit of the Mana series extremely well". He singled out the "battle tracks and event themes" as the weakest tracks and "'The Tale Told by the Wind' and the final battle" as some of the best.

Track list

Disc 1
No.	Title	Japanese title	Length
1.	"To the Heroes of Old ~Opening Theme from HEROES of MANA~"	古の勇者達へ ~Opening Theme from HEROES of MANA~	1:52
2.	"HEROES of MANA"	HEROES of MANA	2:49
3.	"The Premonition Begins"	始まりの予感	2:33
4.	"Charge!"	襲撃!	2:36
5.	"Let's Begin the Story"	お話を始めよう	0:10
6.	"The Beast Kingdom"	The Beast Kingdom	2:36
7.	"Army of the Beast King"	獣王軍	3:40
8.	"Tense Movement"	胎動	2:16
9.	"Power to Tomorrow"	明日への力	1:12
10.	"A Moment's Rest"	ひとときの休息	1:16
11.	"Setup"	セットアップ	2:30
12.	"The Way the Heart Is"	その心のままに	4:38
13.	"Black Mirror"	黒き鏡	2:11
14.	"Kingdom of the Wind"	風の王国	2:39
15.	"Tale of the Old Nostalgic Kingdom"	古く懐かしき国の物語	4:03
16.	"A Prayer for the Holy Capital"	聖なる都に祈りを	3:25
17.	"Gazing at the Dream of the Flowing Sand"	流れる砂が見る夢は	2:07
18.	"At the End of the Hot Sands"	熱砂の果てに	3:36
19.	"Hidden Light"	秘やかな燦めき	1:52
20.	"Make the Oath, Friend!"	友よ誓いを!	3:16
21.	"And Thus Fate Becomes Cruel"	運命はかくも残酷に	3:55
22.	"Retreat"	撤退	2:49
23.	"With Courage and Prayer"	勇気と願いを	4:16
24.	"The Dragon Emperor"	竜帝	4:14
25.	"Summoning the Beast God"	神獣召還	1:02
26.	"A Time of Happiness"	幸せのとき	1:13
27.	"Strategy Meeting"	作戦会議	2:13

Disc 2
No.	Title	Japanese title	Length
1.	"A Song of Ice and Snow"	氷と雪が奏でる歌	3:40
2.	"A Cold Beat"	冷たき鼓動	4:34
3.	"To the Heroes of Old"	古の勇者達へ	3:23
4.	"An Offering to King Annais"	アナイス王に捧ぐ	3:42
5.	"The Battle VS. Celestan"	The Battle VS. Celestan	3:35
6.	"The Knights of the Wind"	風の騎士たち	3:14
7.	"Make an Effort"	一息入れて	2:39
8.	"Tenacity"	頑張りやさん	2:31
9.	"Secret Objective"	内緒の目標	3:55
10.	"The Wings of Soaring Reality"	天翔る真実の翼	2:33
11.	"Battle With the Beast God"	神獣との闘い	3:59
12.	"Sadness"	悲しみ	2:11
13.	"Why Are We Without Hope..."	我らに希望はないのか…	3:50
14.	"Illusionary Fragment"	幻影のフラグメント	3:53
15.	"Ring of Revolving Fate"	廻る運命の輪	2:08
16.	"It's Either Real or Not"	それは真実か幻か	3:24
17.	"The Trembling Earth, The Time of Fate"	震える大地、運命の時	3:54
18.	"And Those Who Finally Reached Their Destination"	そしてそこへ辿りつく者	4:15
19.	"Time for the March to Ruin"	滅び行く時	4:28
20.	"With the Holy Sword, Deliver the Final Blow"	聖剣でとどめ	1:55
21.	"Journey to the Darkness"	闇への旅立ち	1:29
22.	"The Tale Told by the Wind ~Ending Theme from HEROES of MANA~"	風が教えてくれた物語 ~Ending Theme from HEROES of MANA~	3:54

== 20th Anniversary ==
For the 20th anniversary of the Mana series in 2011, Square Enix released a number of albums. These included several arranged albums, as well as a box set of every soundtrack album from the series plus Let Thoughts Ride on Knowledge and Secret of Mana+. The twenty-disc set, entitled Seiken Densetsu Music Complete Book, was released on September 14. It includes music composed by Kenji Ito, Nobuo Uematsu, Hiroki Kikuta, Yoko Shimomura, Masaharu Iwata, Takayuki Aihara, Tsuyoshi Sekito, Masayoshi Soken, and Ryuichi Sakamoto. The album has a total length of 19:35:19.

=== Re:Birth ===
Re:Birth/Seiken Densetsu Kenji Ito Arrange Album

Soundtrack album by Kenji Ito
- Released: October 19, 2011
- Genre: Video game soundtrack
- Length: 45:06
- Label: Square Enix

As a part of the anniversary celebration, Square Enix released an album of arrangements of music from the series, Re:Birth/Seiken Densetsu Kenji Ito Arrange Album. The album features ten arrangements by Kenji Ito of music he composed for Final Fantasy Adventure, Sword of Mana, Children of Mana, and Dawn of Mana. Six tracks are from the original game, two from Dawn, and one each from the other two games. The album was published by Square Enix on October 19, with a duration of 45:06. The arrangements cover a wide variety of genres, from vocal and chamber music to techno and dubstep. The album was originally planned to be followed soon after by two more similar albums, one each from Hiroki Kikuta and Yoko Shimamura, but those albums were never released.

Patrick Gann of RPGFan felt that the album's tracks were "hit-or-miss", containing some stellar arrangements mixed in with lackluster ones. He recommended it to any collector of Mana music. Jayson Napolitano of Original Sound Version was more complimentary towards the album, enjoying many of the tracks that Gann did not, though he too was not as impressed by the Dawn of Mana arrangements.

Track list
No.	Title	Japanese title	Length
1.	"Re:Birth - Rising Sun (from Seiken 1)"	Re:Birth - Rising Sun ∗from 聖剣1	3:25
2.	"Re:Birth - In Search of the Sacred Sword (from Seiken 1)"	Re:Birth - 聖剣を求めて ∗from 聖剣1	4:21
3.	"Re:Birth - Mana's Mission (from Seiken 1)"	Re:Birth - マナの使命 ∗from 聖剣1	4:08
4.	"Re:Birth - Mana Palace (from Seiken 1)"	Re:Birth - マナの神殿 ∗from 聖剣1	5:01
5.	"Re:Birth - Infant of Mana (from Seiken CoM)"	Re:Birth - マナの嬰児 ∗from 聖剣CoM	4:30
6.	"Re:Birth - The Fool's Dance (from Seiken 4)"	Re:Birth - 愚者の舞 ∗from 聖剣4	4:40
7.	"Re:Birth - Battle 2 -Touched by Courage and Pride- (from Shinyaku Seiken)"	Re:Birth - 戦闘2-勇気と誇りを胸に- ∗from 新約聖剣	3:53
8.	"Re:Birth - Final Battle (from Seiken 1)"	Re:Birth - 最後の決戦 ∗from 聖剣1	4:52
9.	"Re:Birth - The Endless Dream (from Seiken 4)"	Re:Birth - 終わりなき愛 ∗from 聖剣4	5:17
10.	"Re:Birth - Legend Forever (from Seiken 1)"	Re:Birth - 伝説よ永遠に ∗from 聖剣1	4:59

== Rise of Mana ==
Seiken Densetsu: Rise of Mana Original Soundtrack

Soundtrack album by Tsuyoshi Sekito, Kenji Ito, Hiroki Kikuta, Yoko Shimomura, Yasuhiro Yamanaka, and Kokia
- Released: April 23, 2014
- Genre: Video game soundtrack
- Length: 1:07:04
- Label: Square Enix Music

In 2014, Square Enix released Rise of Mana, a free-to-play action role-playing game for iOS and Android. The music of Rise of Mana was composed by a group of different composers: the majority of the music was handled by Tsuyoshi Sekito. In addition to Sekito, the soundtrack was also contributed to by three previous Mana composers: Kenji Ito (Final Fantasy Adventure, Children of Mana, Dawn of Mana), Hiroki Kikuta (Secret of Mana, Trials of Mana) and Yoko Shimomura (Legend of Mana, Heroes of Mana). Also joining the team was sound engineer Yasuhiro Yamanaka. In all, 21 out of the 28 composed pieces were done by Sekito. Ito, Kikuta, Shimomura and Yamanaka each contributed one track. The soundtrack featured an arrangement for piano of "Rising Sun", the series' main theme. Yamanaka acted as sound director, while poro@lier created the piano arrangements for both "Rising Sun" and the game's theme song.

The game's theme song, "Believe in the Spirit", was composed, written and sung by Japanese singer-songwriter Kokia. Prior to coming on board, she had little knowledge of the Mana series. As with her previous compositions for video games, Kokia tried to get a feel for the game's atmosphere before starting, either through playing the game directly or looking at behind-the-scenes material related to the game's world. With "Believe in the Spirit", she worked to create a song that would appeal to both players and the production team. The track was performed using strings, a tin whistle, an acoustic guitar and percussion. The arrangement was done by Mina Kubota.

Seiken Densetsu: Rise of Mana Original Soundtrack was released on April 23, 2014, through Square Enix's music label. Andrew Barker of RPGFan was cautiously positive about the album: he described "Believe in the Spirit" as being "hit-or-miss" for different listeners while evoking memories of earlier Mana games. The rest of the soundtrack was generally praised: the first half's restful melodies were the stand-out tracks and said to be the strongest, while the later upbeat tracks were praised for their various energizing qualities. Some tracks, such as "The Drip Drip Drip of Memory", being fairly weak and forgettable. Barker generally compared the music to that of Final Fantasy XII, recommending it for fans of the latter and finishing that the album was generally good despite some unmemorable pieces. Chris Greening of Video Game Music Online gave the album a 2.5-star rating: he was most positive about the tracks from the guest composers like Ito and Shimomura. While he praised Sekito for moving away from his traditional musical style, he felt that the result was fairly mixed, with some tracks lacking the proper emotional drive and others "falling flat". "Believe in the Spirit" was praised for avoiding J-pop elements and sticking with its Celtic style, being favorably compared to the theme songs of Xenogears. Overall, Green felt that, while it had good production value and was substantially better than other mobile game soundtracks, but lacked the emotional impact of previous Mana titles in the majority of its tracks. Many reviewers of the game also praised the soundtrack.

Track list
No.	Title	Japanese title	Length
1.	"Re:Birth - Rising Sun (from Seiken 1)"	Re:Birth - Rising Sun ∗from 聖剣1	3:25
2.	"Believe in the Spirit"	Believe in the Spirit	4:25
3.	"Silent Resolve"	静かなる決意	2:22
4.	"Sunlight through the Trees"	木漏れ日の中で	1:59
5.	"Where the Heart Beats Free"	心踊りし魂の住処	3:12
6.	"Luck of the Draw"	くじびきひいたら、み〜んなハッピーにゃ！	1:05
7.	"Ode to the Workshop"	工房賛歌	1:47
8.	"The Drip Drip Drip of Memory"	美しき想いの雫	4:33
9.	"The Enemy Appears"	立ちふさがる強敵	2:18
10.	"Fanfare!"	ファンファーレ！	0:55
11.	"Ominous Clouds"	暗雲	1:23
12.	"Those Who Delve into Darkness"	暗闇に潜むモノたち	3:05
13.	"Breath of the Goddess"	女神の息吹き	2:56
14.	"Heart's Lament"	憂心	1:31
15.	"A Map Unfurled"	旅立ちの地図	1:48
16.	"On Windswept Lands"	風馳せる地にて	3:37
17.	"Quickening Light"	光の胎動	1:48
18.	"A Worthy Foe"	試練の相克	2:46
19.	"Curtainfall"	閉幕	0:11
20.	"One Bard's Tune"	とある詩人の調べ	4:00
21.	"Tension"	緊迫	0:50
22.	"The Far Side of Grief"	嘆きの彼方	2:36
23.	"This Way to Another Dimension"	異次元への道標	1:35
24.	"Fear the Messenger"	汝、彼の使いの恐怖を知るや	2:05
25.	"The Sanctuary of Mana"	マナの聖域	3:16
26.	"Omen"	予兆	1:26
27.	"Back to Mana's Embrace"	生命に還る刻	2:48
28.	"Rising Sun: An End, A Beginning (Piano Arrangement)"	Rising Sun 〜 ひとつの終わり、ひとつの始まり 〜 [Piano Arrange Ver.]	2:25
29.	"Believe in the Spirit (Instrumental)"	Believe in the Spirit [Instrumental]	4:22

== Legacy ==
The track "Fear of the Heavens" from Secret of Mana was performed by the Tokyo Symphony Orchestra for the third Orchestral Game Concert in 1993, while "Meridian Child" from Trials of Mana was performed for the fifth Orchestral Game Concert in 1996. "Fear of the Heavens" was also performed at the fifth Symphonic Game Music Concert in 2007 in Leipzig, Germany. Legend of Mana's title theme was also performed by the Australian Eminence Symphony Orchestra for its classical gaming music concert A Night in Fantasia 2007. Kenji Ito, along with other players, performed "Fool's Dance" from Dawn of Mana at the Extra: Hyper Game Music Event 2007 concert in Tokyo on July 7. Sinfonia Drammatica, an August 4, 2009 concert performed by the Royal Stockholm Philharmonic Orchestra in Stockholm, Sweden, featured several Mana songs as part of a combination of Yoko Shimomura's album Drammatica and the previous Stockholm Symphonic Shades concert. These tracks, all from Drammatica, were "Colored Earth", "Sparkling City", "Title Theme", and "Hometown Domina" from Legends of Mana; none of the Heroes of Mana tracks on the album were played at the concert.

Music from the series made up one-fourth of the music in the Symphonic Fantasies concerts in Cologne and Oberhausen in September 2009 which were produced by the creators of the Symphonic Game Music Concert series and conducted by Arnie Roth. The concerts featured a suite comprising Secret of Mana songs "Fear of the Heavens", "Flight into the Unknown", "Eternal Recurrence", "Premonition", "The Sorcerer", and "Rose and Spirit", as well as a boss battle encore suite which included "Meridian Festival". The Eminence Symphony Orchestra played a concert in Tokyo on February 6, 2011 as part of the Game Music Laboratory concert series as a tribute to the music of Kenji Ito and Hiroki Kikuta. The concert included "Bodorui", "Mana Temple", and "Rising Sun" from Final Fantasy Adventure; "Kind Memories", "Crisis", and "Meridian Dance" from Secret of Mana; and "Meridian Child" from Trials of Mana. The Final Fantasy Adventure pieces were played on the piano by Ito. A concert composed of music from the Re:Birth album and the Re:Birth II SaGa series album was performed in Tokyo on May 9, 2015, and in Osaka on May 10. The concert was produced by Ito, and featured him on piano.

Music from the original soundtracks of the Mana games has been arranged for the piano and published by DOREMI Music Publishing. Books are available for the soundtracks to Dawn of Mana, Legend of Mana, and Sword of Mana. Two companion books have also been published as Seiken Densetsu Best Collection Piano Solo Sheet Music first and second editions, with the first edition covering tracks from Final Fantasy Adventure, Secret of Mana, and Trials of Mana, while the second adds tracks from Legend of Mana and Dawn of Mana. All songs in each book have been rewritten by Asako Niwa as beginning to intermediate level piano solos, though they are meant to sound as much like the originals as possible. Additionally, KMP Music Publishing has published a book of the piano album included in the Sword of Mana soundtrack album, which was arranged by Kenji Ito.

== See also ==
- Music of the Final Fantasy series
