= Music of the Final Fantasy Tactics series =

Music from the Final Fantasy Tactics video game series

The music of the Final Fantasy Tactics series, composed of Final Fantasy Tactics, Tactics Advance, Tactics A2: Grimoire of the Rift, and The War of the Lions, was primarily composed by Hitoshi Sakimoto. He was assisted by Masaharu Iwata in composing the music for Final Fantasy Tactics. The Final Fantasy Tactics Original Soundtrack, a compilation of almost all of the music in the game, was released by DigiCube in 1997, and re-released by Square Enix in 2006. No separate soundtrack has been released for Final Fantasy Tactics: The War of the Lions. The soundtrack was well received by critics, who found it to be astounding and one of the best video game music soundtracks in existence at the time of its release.

The music of Final Fantasy Tactics Advance was again composed by Hitoshi Sakimoto, with assistance from Nobuo Uematsu, Kaori Ohkoshi, and Ayako Saso. The Final Fantasy Tactics Advance Original Soundtrack, a compilation of almost all of the music in the game, was released by DigiCube in 2003. A new age arrangement album entitled White: Melodies of Final Fantasy Tactics Advance, a selection of musical tracks from the game arranged by Yo Yamazaki, Akira Sasaki, and Satoshi Henmi, was released by SME Visual Works in 2003. Final Fantasy Tactics Advance Original Soundtrack was well received by critics, who praised the album's composition. Critics did not react as well to the White: Melodies of Final Fantasy Tactics Advance album, finding it to be a mediocre album with poor arrangements.

The music for Final Fantasy Tactics A2: Grimoire of the Rift was also composed by Hitoshi Sakimoto, this time with the assistance of composers from his company Basiscape. The music was released as Final Fantasy Tactics A2: Grimoire of the Rift Original Soundtrack by Square Enix in 2007. It was enjoyed by reviewers, who found it to be pleasant and rewarding.

== Albums ==
=== Final Fantasy Tactics Original Soundtrack ===
Final Fantasy Tactics Original Soundtrack

Soundtrack album by Hitoshi Sakimoto, Masaharu Iwata
- Released: June 21, 1997; March 24, 2006 (re-release)
- Genre: Video game soundtrack
- Length: Disc 1: 75:13; Disc 2: 75:50
- Label: DigiCube; Square Enix (re-release)

Final Fantasy Tactics Original Soundtrack is a soundtrack album of video game music from Final Fantasy Tactics, and was composed by Hitoshi Sakimoto and Masaharu Iwata. Sakimoto composed 46 tracks for the game, and Iwata composed the other 25. The album was first released on two Compact Discs by DigiCube on June 21, 1997, bearing the catalog number SSCX-10008, and was re-released by Square Enix on March 24, 2006, with the catalog numbers SQEX-10066-7. It spans two discs and 71 tracks, covering a duration of 2:31:03.

The Final Fantasy Tactics Original Soundtrack reached #62 on the Japan Oricon charts, selling over 12,400 copies. It received positive reviews from critics such as Patrick Gann of RPGFan. Ryan of Square Enix Music Online praised the way that the two composers' pieces blended together, and termed the album "one of the greatest soundtracks ever made and a true work of inspiration".

Track list

Disc 1
No.	Title	Japanese title	Length
1.	"Bland Logo~Title Back"	Bland Logo~Title Back	1:10
2.	"Backborn Story"	Backborn Story	1:34
3.	"P.R. Movie"	P.R. Movie	0:48
4.	"Unit Introductions"	ユニット紹介 Yunitto Shōkai	3:50
5.	"Player Creation"	プレイヤーメイク Pureiyā Meiku	1:46
6.	"Prologue Movie"	Prologue Movie	2:52
7.	"Chapel"	礼拝堂 Reihaidō	1:00
8.	"Enemy Soldiers Attack"	敵兵襲撃 Tekihei Shūgeki	1:00
9.	"Trisection"	Trisection	2:37
10.	"Officer Cadet"	士官候補生 Shikankōhosei	1:58
11.	"Attack Team"	アタックチーム Atakku Chīmu	0:49
12.	"Unavoidable Battle"	Unavoidable Battle	1:45
13.	"Battle's End"	戦闘終了 Sentō Shūryō	0:25
14.	"Main Character's Theme"	主人公のテーマ Shujinkō no Tēma	1:13
15.	"A Chapel"	A Chapel	2:33
16.	"Algas"	アルガスとの出会い Arugasu to no Deai	2:03
17.	"World Map"	ワールドマップ Wārudo Mappu	0:54
18.	"Shop"	ショップ Shoppu	0:52
19.	"Soldier Agency"	戦士斡旋所 Senshi Assenjo	1:03
20.	"Fur, Meat, and Bones Trade"	毛皮骨肉商 Kegawakotsunikushō	0:57
21.	"Formation Screen"	編成画面 Hensei Gamen	0:58
22.	"Brave Story"	ブレイブストーリー Bureibu Sutōrī	1:19
23.	"Pub"	酒場 Sakaba	1:02
24.	"Data Screen"	データ画面 Dēta Gamen	0:58
25.	"Desert Land"	Desert Land	2:51
26.	"Alma's Theme"	アルマのテーマ Aruma no Tēma	1:12
27.	"Doubtful Atmosphere"	怪しげな雰囲気 Ayashige na Fun'iki	1:53
28.	"Decisive Battle"	Decisive Battle	2:23
29.	"Cry of a Bitter Heart"	悲痛な心の叫び Hitsū na Kokoro no Sakebi	0:56
30.	"Remnants"	Remnants	3:06
31.	"Anxiety Before the Battle"	出撃前緊張 Shutsugekisen Kinchō	2:03
32.	"Tension 1"	緊迫1 Kinpaku 1	2:41
33.	"Game Over"	ゲームオーバー Gēmu Ōbā	0:21
34.	"Tutorial"	チュートリアル Chūtoriaru	2:11
35.	"Random Waltz"	Random Waltz	1:52
36.	"Ovelia's Theme"	オヴェリアのテーマ Overia no Tēma	2:42
37.	"Apoplexy"	Apoplexy	4:10
38.	"Zalbag, The Holy Knight"	聖騎士ザルバッグのテーマ Seikishi Zarubaggu no Tēma	2:03
39.	"Run Past Through the Plain"	Run Past Through The Plain	1:58
40.	"Scheme"	謀略 Bōryaku	2:42
41.	"Delita's Theme"	ディリータのテーマ Dirīta no Tēma	1:43
42.	"Back Fire"	Back Fire	3:01

Disc 2
No.	Title	Japanese title	Length
1.	"Memories"	思い出 Omoide	1:46
2.	"Dicedarg's Theme"	ダイスダーグのテーマ Daisudāgu no Tēma	1:28
3.	"Antipyretic"	Antipyretic	3:41
4.	"Saint Ajora's Theme"	聖アジョラのテーマ Sei Ajora no Tēma	2:51
5.	"Bloody Excrement"	Bloody Excrement	2:46
6.	"And I Ran Away"	そして僕は逃げ出した Soshite Boku wa Nigedashita	0:28
7.	"Espionage"	Espionage	2:25
8.	"Descent"	降臨 Kōrin	3:21
9.	"Ovelia's Worries"	オヴェリアの不安 Overia no Fuan	3:42
10.	"Under The Stars"	Under The Stars	3:15
11.	"Battle on the Bridge"	橋上の戦い Hashiue no Tatakai	3:31
12.	"Cardinal's Anger"	枢機卿の怒り Sūkikei no Ikari	2:41
13.	"In Pursuit"	In Pursuit	2:33
14.	"Shock!!~Despair"	Shock!!~絶望 Shock!! ~ Zetsubō	2:20
15.	"Saint Ajora's Theme Deluxe Edition"	聖アジョラのテーマ豪華版 Sei Ajora no Tēma Gōkaban	1:11
16.	"Cry of a Bitter Heart!"	悲痛な心の叫び! Hitsū na Kokoro no Sakebi!	2:41
17.	"Requiem"	レクイエム Rekuiemu	3:13
18.	"Terror 1"	恐怖1 Kyōfu 1	2:08
19.	"The Pervert"	The Pervert	3:53
20.	"Antidote"	Antidote	3:10
21.	"Thunder God Cid's Theme"	雷神シドのテーマ Raijin Shido no Tēma	1:52
22.	"Treasure"	掘り出し物 Horidashimono	2:48
23.	"Night Attack"	Night Attack	2:49
24.	"Terror 2"	恐怖2 Kyōfu 2	2:02
25.	"Ultema The Nice Body"	Ultema The Nice Body	2:17
26.	"Ultema The Perfect Body!"	Ultema The Perfect Body!	3:26
27.	"Last Battle's End"	ラスト戦闘終了 Rasuto Sentō Shūryō	0:18
28.	"Epilogue Movie"	Epilogue Movie	1:37
29.	"Staff Credit"	Staff Credit	5:39

=== Final Fantasy Tactics Advance Original Soundtrack ===
Final Fantasy Tactics Advance Original Soundtrack

Soundtrack album by Hitoshi Sakimoto, Nobuo Uematsu, Kaori Ohkoshi, Ayako Saso
- Released: February 19, 2003; March 24, 2006 (re-release)
- Genre: Video game soundtrack
- Length: 2:05:27
- Label: DigiCube; Square Enix (re-release)

Final Fantasy Tactics Advance Original Soundtrack is a soundtrack album of video game music from Final Fantasy Tactics Advance. The album contains the musical tracks from the game, composed mainly by Hitoshi Sakimoto, with assistance from Nobuo Uematsu, Kaori Ohkoshi, and Ayako Saso. It spans 74 tracks and covers a duration of 2:05:27. The first disk includes every piece of music from the game, as it sounds through the Game Boy Advance hardware. The second disk contains synthesized versions of 32 of the same 42 tracks. The album was released on February 19, 2003, by DigiCube. The release bears the catalog numbers SSCX-10083-4 or SQEX-10070-1 (reprint).

The album reached #130 on the Oricon charts, selling over 1,800 copies. It was received favorably by critics; Richard Vardaro of RPGFan found it to be "beautifully composed" and compared it favorably to the soundtrack to Final Fantasy Tactics. However, he questioned the inclusion of the Game Boy Advance version of the soundtrack, finding it to be "tinny and raspy". Chris of Square Enix Music Online also enjoyed the soundtrack, seeing it as "creative, appealing, and mature" and "a must-have".

Track list

Disc 1
No.	Title	Japanese title	Length
1.	"Main Theme"	メインテーマ Mein Teema	1:45
2.	"Snow Dancing in the Schoolyard"	雪舞う校庭 Yuki Mau Koutei	1:18
3.	"Companions that Surpassed Their Tribe"	種族をこえた仲間たち Shuzoku o Koeta Nakama-tachi	1:58
4.	"Magic Beast Farm"	魔獣牧場 Makedamono Bokujou	1:51
5.	"Crystal"	クリスタル Kurisutaru	1:11
6.	"Unhideable Anxiety"	かくせない不安 Kakusenai Fuan	1:46
7.	"Amber Valley"	琥珀色の谷で Kohaku-iro no Tani de	1:54
8.	"Bell of Victory"	勝利の鐘 Shuuri no Kane	0:08
9.	"At the Pub"	酒場にて Sakaba nite	1:22
10.	"Different World Ivalice"	異世界イヴァリース Isekai Ivariisu	1:09
11.	"Engage"	エンゲージ Engeeji	0:08
12.	"Gathering Allies"	あつまる仲間 Atsumaru Nakama	1:07
13.	"Walking in Ivalice"	イヴァリースの歩き方 Ivariisu no Arukikata	1:33
14.	"Wind of Hope"	希望の風 Kibou no Kaze	0:07
15.	"Teach Me, Montblanc"	おしえてモンブラン Oshiete Mon Buran	1:03
16.	"Wounded Comrades"	傷つく仲間 Kizutsuku Nakama	0:07
17.	"Undefeated Heart"	まけない心 Makenai Kokoro	1:28
18.	"Gained Fruit"	勝ち得た果実 Kachieta Kajitsu	0:13
19.	"Marche"	マーシュ Maaju	0:58
20.	"Painful Battle"	苦しい戦い Kurushii Tatakai	2:01
21.	"Notice of Retreat"	退却の知らせ Taikyaku no Shirase	0:08
22.	"Sleep of Defeat"	敗北の眠り Haiboku no Nemuri	0:49
23.	"Prison"	プリズン Purizun	1:36
24.	"Surpassing the Wall"	こえていく壁 Koete iku Kabe	1:18
25.	"Exhausted Ones"	疲れ果てたもの Tsukarehateta Mono	0:13
26.	"Mewt"	ミュート Myuuto	1:28
27.	"Battle of Hope"	希望への戦い Kibou e no Tatakai	2:05
28.	"Level Up!"	レベルアップ Reberu Appu	0:06
29.	"Law Card"	ロウカード Rou Kaado	1:22
30.	"Ritz"	リッツ Rittsu	1:36
31.	"Mysterious Shop"	不思議なショップ Fushigi na Shoppu	1:02
32.	"The Road We Both Aim For"	ともに目指す道 Tomo ni Mezasu Michi	1:44
33.	"Wind of Liberation"	解放の風 Kaihou no Kaze	0:13
34.	"Confusion"	とまどい Tomadoi	1:33
35.	"Judge"	ジャッジ Jajji	0:07
36.	"Beyond the Wasteland"	荒野の向こう Areno no Mukou	1:20
37.	"The World Starting to Move"	動きだす世界 Ugokidasu Sekai	1:21
38.	"Unavoidable Destiny"	さけられぬ運命 Sakerarenu Unmei	1:33
39.	"Incarnation"	化身 Keshin	1:50
40.	"Vanishing World"	消え行く世界 Kieru iku Sekai	2:06
41.	"The Place We Should Return To"	帰るべきところ Kaeru beki Tokoro	2:15
42.	"Fulfilled Dream Segment"	かなえられた夢のかけら Kanaerareta Yume no Kakera	2:54

Disc 2
No.	Title	Japanese title	Length
1.	"Main Theme"	メインテーマ Mein Teema	1:43
2.	"Snow Dancing in the Schoolyard"	雪舞う校庭 Yuki Mau Koutei	2:37
3.	"Companions that Surpassed Their Tribe"	種族をこえた仲間たち Shuzoku o Koeta Nakama-tachi	3:27
4.	"Magic Beast Farm"	魔獣牧場 Makedamono Bokujou	1:44
5.	"Crystal"	クリスタル Kurisutaru	1:41
6.	"Unhideable Anxiety"	かくせない不安 Kakusenai Fuan	4:05
7.	"Amber Valley"	琥珀色の谷で Kohaku-iro no Tani de	3:39
8.	"At the Pub"	酒場にて Sakaba nite	1:16
9.	"Different World Ivalice"	異世界イヴァリース Isekai Ivariisu	1:13
10.	"Gathering Allies"	あつまる仲間 Atsumaru Nakama	1:40
11.	"Walking in Ivalice"	イヴァリースの歩き方 Ivariisu no Arukikata	1:45
12.	"Teach Me, Montblanc"	おしえてモンブラン Oshiete Mon Buran	1:59
13.	"Undefeated Heart"	まけない心 Makenai Kokoro	7:32
14.	"Marche"	マーシュ Maaju	2:15
15.	"Painful Battle"	苦しい戦い Kurushii Tatakai	3:49
16.	"Sleep of Defeat"	敗北の眠り Haiboku no Nemuri	0:38
17.	"Prison"	プリズン Purizun	1:36
18.	"Surpassing the Wall"	こえていく壁 Koete iku Kabe	1:21
19.	"Mewt"	ミュート Myuuto	1:30
20.	"Battle of Hope"	希望への戦い Kibou e no Tatakai	3:49
21.	"Law Card"	ロウカード Rou Kaado	1:21
22.	"Ritz"	リッツ Rittsu	1:31
23.	"Mysterious Shop"	不思議なショップ Fushigi na Shoppu	1:02
24.	"The Road We Both Aim For"	ともに目指す道 Tomo ni Mezasu Michi	1:45
25.	"Confusion"	とまどい Tomadoi	1:34
26.	"Beyond the Wasteland"	荒野の向こう Areno no Mukou	2:27
27.	"The World Starting to Move"	動き出す世界 Ugokidasu Sekai	2:27
28.	"Unavoidable Destiny"	さけられぬ運命 Sakerarenu Unmei	2:39
29.	"Incarnation"	化身 Keshin	1:47
30.	"Vanishing World"	消え行く世界 Kieru iku Sekai	2:02
31.	"The Place We Should Return To"	帰るべきところ Kaeru beki Tokoro	2:14
32.	"Fulfilled Dream Segment"	かなえられた夢のかけら Kanaerareta Yume no Kakera	2:53

=== White: Melodies of Final Fantasy Tactics Advance ===
White: Melodies of Final Fantasy Tactics Advance

Soundtrack album by Hitoshi Sakimoto, Nobuo Uematsu, Kaori Ohkoshi, Ayako Saso
- Released: February 26, 2003
- Genre: Video game soundtrack
- Length: 46:10
- Label: SME Visual Works

White: Melodies of Final Fantasy Tactics Advance is an arranged album of music from Final Fantasy Tactics Advance. The album contains the musical tracks from the game, composed mainly by Hitoshi Sakimoto, with assistance from Nobuo Uematsu, Kaori Ohkoshi, and Ayako Saso, and arranged by Yo Yamazaki, Akira Sasaki, and Satoshi Henmi. It spans 11 tracks and covers a duration of 46:10. It was released on February 26, 2003, by SME Visual Works. The release bears the catalog number SVWC-7172.

White was not received well by critics, with Patrick Gann finding it to be a mediocre album and saying that he felt "very disappointed" with it. He found the "new-age" style to be poorly chosen and the arrangements to be sub-par. Zeugma of Square Enix Music Online was more approving of the album, saying that it conveyed the "quiet mood" it promised, but finding it to sometimes be "dangerously close to muzak" with too many synthesized instruments and too little variation.

Track list
No.	Title	Japanese title	Length
1.	"Magic Beast Farm (Bandneon version)"	魔獣牧場（Bandneon version）	4:29
2.	"Different World Ivalice (Piano version)"	異世界イヴァリース（Piano version）	4:19
3.	"Crystal (Quena version)"	クリスタル（Quena version）	3:43
4.	"Mewt (Acoustic guitar version)"	ミュート（Acoustic guitar version）	4:04
5.	"Teach Me, Mont Blanc (Fagot version)"	おしえてモンブラン（Fagot version）	4:22
6.	"Marche (Love for humanity version)"	マーシュ（Love for humanity version）	4:01
7.	"Main Theme (Piano Version)"	メインテーマ（Piano version）	4:08
8.	"Unhideable Anxiety (Electric guitar version)"	かくせない不安（Electric guitar version）	4:09
9.	"Beyond the Wasteland (Bandneon version)"	荒野のむこう（Bandneon version）	4:21
10.	"The Place we Should Return to (Invincible version)"	帰るべきところ（Invincible version）	3:40
11.	"Amber Valley (Sing me softly version)"	琥珀色の谷で（Sing me softly version）	4:48

=== Final Fantasy Tactics A2: Grimoire of the Rift Original Soundtrack ===
Final Fantasy Tactics A2: Grimoire of the Rift Original Soundtrack

Soundtrack album by Hitoshi Sakimoto, Nobuo Uematsu, Ayako Saso, Kaori Oogoshi, Mitsuhiro Kaneda
- Released: November 28, 2007
- Genre: Video game soundtrack
- Length: 2:13:10
- Label: Square Enix

Final Fantasy Tactics A2: Grimoire of the Rift Original Soundtrack is a soundtrack album of music from Final Fantasy Tactics A2: Grimoire of the Rift. The album contains the musical tracks from the game, composed mainly by Hitoshi Sakimoto, with assistance of composers from Basiscape, his composing studio. Several compositions were also taken from the scores of Final Fantasy Tactics Advance and Final Fantasy XII. It spans 56 tracks across two disks and covers a duration of 2:13:10. It was released on November 28, 2007, by Square Enix. The release bears the catalog numbers SQEX-710102-3.

The album received positive reviews from critics, with Vincent Chorley of RPGFan terming it "one of the most rewardingly pleasant soundtracks this year". Ovelia of Square Enix Music Online also enjoyed the soundtrack, saying that it was "mature yet still playful", but worried that it hinted at a stagnation in Sakimoto's musical style.

Track list

Disc 1
No.	Title	Japanese title	Length
1.	"Main Theme"	メインテーマ Mein Tēma	1:50
2.	"Putting Words Together"	つづられる言葉 Tsuzurareru Kotoba	0:54
3.	"Green Wind"	緑の風 Midori no Kaze	2:55
4.	"Unfold the Map"	地図を広げて Chizu o Hirogete	1:42
5.	"Companions That Surpassed Their Tribes"	種族をこえた仲間たち Shuzoku o Koeta Nakama-tachi	3:25
6.	"At the Bar"	酒場にて Sakaba nite	2:39
7.	"Engage"	エンゲージ Engēji	0:09
8.	"Knowledge of the Adventurer"	冒険者の心得 Bōkensha no Kokoroe	2:25
9.	"Grasp Victory"	つかんだ勝利 Tsukanda Shōri	0:13
10.	"Level Up"	レベルアップ Reberu Appu	0:09
11.	"Gained Fruit"	勝ち得た果実 Kachieta Kajitsu	0:14
12.	"Luso"	ルッソ Russo	1:50
13.	"Gathering Allies"	あつまる仲間 Atsumaru Nakam	2:17
14.	"Signpost"	道しるべ Michishirube	2:23
15.	"Cid"	シド Shido	2:10
16.	"Mysterious Shop"	不思議なショップ Fushigi na Shoppu	2:08
17.	"Adel"	アデル Aderu	2:21
18.	"Unpreparedness is One's Greatest Foe"	油断大敵 Yudan Taiteki	2:50
19.	"Mad Dash!"	全力疾走! Zenryoku Shissō!	3:08
20.	"Unhideable Anxiety"	かくせない不安 Kakusenai Fuan	2:38
21.	"Into the Fantasy"	幻想の中で Gensō no Naka de	2:51
22.	"Determination"	決意 Ketsui	2:25
23.	"A Grand Spell"	大いなる呪文 Ōinaru Jumon	2:44
24.	"A Shadow Lurking"	潜む陰 Hisomu Kage	2:55
25.	"A Time Eternal"	悠久の時 Yūkyū no Toki	3:30
26.	"Beyond the Wasteland"	荒野のむこう Kōya no Mukō	2:38
27.	"Beating Heart"	高鳴る心 Takanaru Kokoro	3:02
28.	"Comparison of Wisdom"	知恵くらべ Chie Kurabe	1:43
29.	"Bell of Victory"	勝利の鐘 Shōri no Kane	0:08

Disc 2
No.	Title	Japanese title	Length
1.	"Peaceful Days"	平和な日々 Heiwa na Hibi	3:54
2.	"Summer Vacation"	夏休み Natsuyasumi	1:59
3.	"Bookmark"	ブックマーク Bukkumāku	1:55
4.	"Crossing Over the Hill"	丘をこえて Oka o Koete	2:41
5.	"A Hurried Guess"	すたこらさっさ Sutakora Sassa	2:28
6.	"To the Peak"	頂上へ Chōjō e	3:39
7.	"That Which Stands in the Way"	立ちはだかるもの Tachihadakaru Mono	3:35
8.	"Sorrow"	哀しみ Kanashimi	2:28
9.	"The Sky Pirates from the East"	東から来た空賊 Higashi kara Kita Kūzoku	3:08
10.	"Painful Battle"	苦しい戦い Kurushii Tatakai	4:00
11.	"Wounded Comrades"	傷つく仲間 Kizutsuku Nakama	0:10
12.	"Sleep of Defeat"	敗北の眠り Haiboku no Nemuri	1:36
13.	"Premonition of Origin"	はじまりの予感 Hajimari no Yokan	1:31
14.	"Airport"	エアポート Eapōto	3:13
15.	"Abyss"	深淵 Shin'en	3:35
16.	"Looming Crisis"	迫り来る危機 Semarikuru Kiki	2:31
17.	"A Grave Error"	手痛いミス Teitai Misu	0:10
18.	"Requiem"	レクイエム Rekuiemu	3:09
19.	"Finale/The End"	終局 Shūkyoku	3:35
20.	"Front and Back"	表と裏 Omote to Ura	4:13
21.	"Conclusion"	決着 Ketchaku	3:02
22.	"The Unfolding Darkness"	開かれる闇 Akareru Yami	2:33
23.	"The End of the Tale"	物語の終わり Monogatari no Owari	3:03
24.	"A Hymn for the Journey"	旅立ちに贈る詩 Tabidachi ni Okuru Shi	2:06
25.	"A Sound that Connects the World"	世界をつなぐひびき Sekai o Tsunagu Hibiki	0:44
26.	"Each Story"	それぞれの物語 Sorezore no Monogatari	2:39
27.	"Words Put Together"	つづられた言葉 Tsuzurareta Kotoba	5:40

== Legacy ==
A radio drama based on Final Fantasy Tactics Advance was broadcast starting in January 2003, preceding the release of the game. The shows were compiled in a series of four CDs entitled Final Fantasy Tactics Advance Radio Edition vol. 1-4. The CDs were released by DigiCube on February 26, March 26, April 23, and May 21, 2003, with the catalog numbers SSCX-10082, SSCX-10088, SSCX-10092, and SSCX-10094, respectively. Additionally, a single was released by Sony Records on November 27, 2002, with the catalog number SRCL-5513 containing the song "Shiroi hana", performed by Zone, which was used as an image song for commercials for Final Fantasy Tactics Advance. A medley of pieces from Final Fantasy Tactics A2 was played at the Fantasy Comes Alive concert in Singapore on April 30, 2010. Selections of music from the Final Fantasy Tactics series have also appeared on Japanese remix albums, called dojin music, and on English remixing websites.
