= Characters of Final Fantasy V =

Promotional art of the playable characters of Final Fantasy V by Yoshitaka Amano; from left, Bartz, Krile, Lenna, and Faris.

Final Fantasy V, a video game with a setting that spans two worlds and a back-story spanning a millennium, features an array of characters. The game has five player characters, with as many as four in the party at a time. The game contains a number of the Final Fantasy series' recurring characters, such as Cid, and even chocobos play some major roles. Many other Final Fantasy V characters share similarities with those in other installments. As with the characters of Final Fantasy VI and other games in the franchise, the promotional art for Final Fantasy V's came from Yoshitaka Amano, who has received praise for his contributions to the series. However, the characters in Final Fantasy V and other aspects of the game are matters of conflicting opinions.

== Development ==
Final Fantasy V was directed by Final Fantasy series creator Hironobu Sakaguchi who, prior to the release of Final Fantasy IX, called it his favorite Final Fantasy game. The character designs were done by Kazuko Shibuya, who also designed the game's character sprites. Several of the monsters were designed by Yoshitaka Amano, who was also commissioned for the game's promotional artwork. The rest of the monsters were designed by Tetsuya Nomura. Amano has stated that he counts his depictions of both Faris from Final Fantasy V and Terra from VI among his favorite Final Fantasy designs. The writing of the scenario text was a collaborative effort between Sakaguchi and Yoshinori Kitase. Sakaguchi conceived the plot and was in charge of it, while Kitase tried to include more humor to lighten up the relatively serious story.

== Main playable characters ==
=== Bartz Klauser ===
Bartz Klauser (バッツ・クラウザー, Battsu Kurauzā; Butz Klauser in original Japanese language version) is the protagonist of Square-Enix's Final Fantasy V. He is a twenty-year-old wanderer with a fear of heights, and becomes entangled in the quest to protect the Crystals when he helps Princess Lenna and Galuf escape a goblin-filled area on their way to the Wind Shrine. Bartz is connected to the element of Wind.

Bartz was born in the small town of Lix to Dorgann Klauser, one of the Warriors of Dawn from the second world, and a local woman named Stella (her maiden name is unknown). Stella died of an unknown illness when Bartz was three (she said that she had been suffering from spasms, and collapsed after walking offscreen), leaving him to be raised by his father. Dorgann died when Bartz was seventeen, and it is implied from his dying wish to be buried in the village he finally settled in, with his wife. His parting advice to his son was to wander the world.

Three years later, Bartz is traveling in the Tycoon area when he rescues a young woman being attacked by goblins. She thanks him and tells him that she is looking for her father at the Wind Shrine. Not long afterwards, a meteor crashes and an amnesiatic old man emerges. He and Lenna decide to travel to the Wind Shrine together, but Bartz decides to continue his wanderings. His chocobo stops him, however, and he goes back to help the pair fight off goblins again. It is at that point that Bartz decides that his father would have wanted him to find out what was happening to the Crystals, and joins Lenna and Galuf.

From there, Bartz travels with the party, which is later augmented by the pirate Faris. It seems unclear as to why he is the apparent leader (or at least the character present on the world map) of the group until he beats Kelger's Lupine Attack, something that his father, Dorgann, had taught him. It is revealed to him then that his father was one of the Warriors of Dawn, though he had never told his son (however, a young Bartz overheard his parents talking, with his father asking Stella to promise not to tell Bartz about what he did to protect the Crystals). Bartz's direct descendant became one of the new Warriors of Dawn 200 years later.

In the original 1992 release of the game, the official Japanese guides romanized his name as Butz. In the Anthology release, much criticized for its translation quality, he was named Bartz. The Advance release saw significant improvement in the translation and a restoration of many of the 1992 romanizations, but the character's name remained Bartz. Though no reasons have been given, the Anthology spelling does avoid the possibility of pronouncing his name the same as "butts." However, unlike the other characters, Bartz can be renamed if the player so chooses.

Bartz is the hero representing Final Fantasy V in Dissidia Final Fantasy, where he is voiced by Sōichirō Hoshi in the Japanese version, and Jason Spisak in the English version. He is also featured in the rhythm game Theatrhythm Final Fantasy as a character representing Final Fantasy V.

=== Lenna Tycoon ===
Lenna Charlotte Tycoon (レナ・シャルロット・タイクーン, Rena Sharurotto Taikūn; Reina in Anthology version) is the young princess of Tycoon, and begins the story when her father, King Alexander Tycoon, leaves to investigate the Wind Crystal. She follows him after he does not return and meets Bartz, starting the quest to save the Crystals. Lenna displays many traits of an archetypal video game princess: she is beautiful, kind, and she also has a self-sacrificial streak that puts her in danger several times during the game. However, she also breaks this mold: she is very impulsive, and often does not think before she acts (both characteristics that liken her to the "strong lead female characters" of Final Fantasy. She is connected to the element of Water.

Lenna is the first character the player meets. She is on her way to the Wind Shrine after her father fails to return from it, but encounters some goblins from which Bartz rescues her. After thanking him, the pair meet an amnesia-stricken old man that is, apparently, from the recently crashed meteor. He identifies himself as Galuf, and he and Lenna continue to the Wind Shrine before being attacked by goblins and rescued again by Bartz. At that point, the three decide to travel together.

When they discover a pirate ship that moves without wind, Lenna suggests simply asking them for a ride, an idea discarded when Galuf proposes simply stealing the ship. When they are captured by the captain, Faris, Lenna reveals that she is the Princess of Tycoon in hopes of persuading her to take them to the Wind Shrine, but it only results in Faris considering the prospect of holding her for ransom - but when Lenna displays her royal pendant, Faris decides to join them. It is later revealed that Faris is actually Lenna's long-lost sister, Princess Sarisa. When they reach the Wind Shrine, Lenna is shocked when her father seems to disappear. She has no time to mourn, however, when it is revealed that she is one of the four Warriors of Crystals, fated to protect the crystals.

During the game, Lenna puts her life in danger twice to save a wind drake; these incidents illustrate her compassion, but also show that she can often be naïve (as when she tried to get Faris and her crew to help them) and impulsive. The first time, she traverses a field of poison flowers to bring an ailing drake a piece of Dragon Grass to cure it. The second time, she takes a bite out of some Dragon Grass (which is toxic to humans, a fact she almost certainly knew) to encourage it to eat. In both cases, she succeeds in helping the wind drakes, but she is poisoned in the process; in the first instance, the wind drake heals her. Her affection for dragons is explained in a flashback immediately after the dragon sacrifices itself to become the Phoenix Summon. While Lenna was a child, her mother fell ill, and the only cure would have been the tongue of a dragon. Desperate to see her mother cured, Lenna seized a knife and rushed to the last remaining dragon to cut out its tongue; the dragon would have died from losing its tongue, or would Lenna would have needed to kill it to obtain it. The player, viewing the scene in a flashback, has a chance to make Lenna say whether her mother's life is worth killing the dragon; if the player says no, Lenna will relent, but if the player says yes, her father will angrily knock her aside. No other cure for Queen Tycoon's illness could be found in time, and she died. After that painful experience, Lenna learned the value of self-sacrifice; her mother had loved the dragon, and, as was explained, would have allowed herself to die in order to protect it.

After Exdeath's defeat, Lenna and her sister Faris return to Tycoon Castle. Despite her younger age (Faris is older than her by one year), Lenna becomes the Queen when Faris abandons the throne to rejoin her pirate crew. Her descendants continued to rule for the next 200 years with Queen Lenna as the current ruler in her ancestor's place.

=== Faris Scherwiz ===
Faris Scherwiz (ファリス・シュヴィルツ, Farisu Shuvirutsu) is a pirate captain, and joins the protagonists after they attempt to steal her ship. Originally presenting herself as a man, during the course of the game she is revealed to be a crossdressing woman. She discovers she is Lenna's long lost elder sister Sarisa Highwind Tycoon (サリサ・ハイウィンド・タイクーン, Sarisa Haiwindo Taikūn) (Salsa Charlotte Tycoon in the Anthology version), making her father King Alexander Highwind Tycoon of Tycoon Castle and herself the rightful Queen of Tycoon, a position she does not accept. She has since appeared in later games related to the Final Fantasy franchise, where she is voiced by Rie Tanaka in the Japanese and by Emily O'Brien in English.

=== Galuf Baldesion ===
Galuf Halm Baldesion (ガラフ・ハルム・バルデシオン, Garafu Harumu Barudeshion) is an amnesiac Bartz meets at the start of the game, and is initially referred to as Galuf Doe. Despite losing his memory, he retains his humor and a sense of duty to protect the elemental crystals, joining the party to do so. After being reunited with his granddaughter Krille he regains his memory, where it is revealed he a king from a parallel world. Prior to the events of the game, he and four warriors banded together stop the villain Exdeath, and trapped him in Bartz's world using the power of the crystals. Exdeath however was breaking free, and when traveling to Bartz' world to stop him the impact of the trip caused him to temporarily lose his memories. After Exdeath breaks free he and the others chase after him, but when Exdeath attacks his granddaughter Galuf sacrifices his life to save her.

=== Krile Baldesion ===
Krile Mayer Baldesion (クルル・マイア・バルデシオン, Kururu Maia Barudeshion) is Galuf's granddaughter and only surviving relative. When Galuf travels to Bartz's world she follows after him and helps him recover his memories. Able to communicate with animals such as wyverns and moogles, she helps the party fight Exdeath, only for Galuf to sacrifice his life to protect her. However, she inherits his abilities and skills, and takes over his role in the party to help stop Exdeath for good as she comes to regard them as her new family.

She is voiced by Yukari Tamura in Dissidia Duellum Final Fantasy.

== Antagonists ==
=== Exdeath ===
Exdeath (エクスデス, Ekusudesu) is a powerful warlock, would-be ruler of a parallel world, and the main antagonist in Final Fantasy V. Originally a tree, Exdeath took on a human-like form after countless evil souls were sealed inside it. Attempting to conquer his world prior to the events of Final Fantasy V, he is sealed away, though manipulates events during the course of the game to free himself. Uniting the split worlds of Bartz and Galuf, he gains access to a power called the Void and uses it to attack the heroes and their home. However it eventually consumes him instead and he re-emerges as Neo Exdeath to try and destroy all reality, only to be defeated and destroyed for good. He has since appeared in later games related to the Final Fantasy franchise, voiced by Gerald C. Rivers in English and Tarō Ishida in Japanese, with Naomi Kusumi later taking over the latter's role after Ishida's death.

=== Gilgamesh ===
Gilgamesh (ギルガメッシュ, Girugamesshu) is one of Exdeath's generals, and a recurring boss in the storyline. Although high on determination, he tends to be incompetent and short on courage. He fights the party a total of five times. During the fourth encounter, Gilgamesh transforms using his "Gilgamesh Morphing Time" attack, in which he takes on the form of an eight-armed samurai, carrying various weapons in all but two hands. Genji equipment can be stolen from him during battle. He has a winged underling named Enkidu, who only fights alongside him once, supporting Gilgamesh with the White Wind ability. One of the most famous moments with Gilgamesh is when he finds a sword he thinks is the Excalibur, but is in fact a fake known as Excalipoor. Over the course of the game, he develops from an enemy into a friendly rival, respecting the party's power and enjoying their battles. After being cast into the Void by Exdeath, he is encountered by the party when they too enter the Void. Bartz directs him to the exit and Gilgamesh nearly refers to them as "friends," even suggesting that when they leave the Void, they should go on some "spectacular adventures, just the five of [them]." Shortly after this, Gilgamesh optionally returns (if the player touches the light and fights Necrophobe) and aids the party in their battle against Necrophobe, refusing to be remembered as a weak coward. He gives kind words and advice to each party member, heals them, then sacrifices himself to defeat Necrophobe (though it is possible to defeat Necrophobe before Gilgamesh arrives, thus avoiding this scenario).

However, as revealed in Dissidia 012 Final Fantasy, Gilgamesh ends up traveling to other worlds via the Rift as he still seeks to settle things with Bartz; to date, he has traveled to the worlds of Final Fantasy VIII, XII, IV: The After Years, XIII-2, XIV, Stranger of Paradise: Final Fantasy Origin, and VII Rebirth. Thus, unlike other recurring character names, the Gilgamesh who reappears in most other installments of the Final Fantasy series would usually be the same character with a new and similar look. Since his appearance in the Dissidia series, Gilgamesh has been voiced by Kazuya Nakai in the Japanese version and Keith Szarabajka in the English version; in Final Fantasy XIV, he is voiced by Riki Kitazawa and Kurt Wilson, respectively.

=== Siren ===
Siren (セイレーン, Seirēn) is a demon whose own wanton destruction had created the infamous Ship Graveyard. She attacks the party after they cross through the area, and tries to steal their souls to make them serve her. She distracts Bartz with an image of his mother, Stella, and then both Lenna and Faris with an image of King Tycoon. Siren attempts to lure Galuf with an image of Krile, but he does not recognize it. Galuf then realizes that his companions are being drained of life, so he wakes them up, shattering Siren's magic. Siren then attacks the party, switching between a "living" phase and an "undead" phase. Siren appears in subsequent Final Fantasy titles VI and VIII as a summon monster.

=== Magissa and Forza ===
A team of dragon hunters who attack the party en route while tracking Hiryu on North Mountain. Magissa (マギサ, Magisa) lures an unsuspecting Lenna with King Tycoon's helmet, then fires a poison arrow at her, while Forza (フォルツァ, Forutsa) (unseen) demolishes part of the cliff separating Lenna from the party. Magissa suggests holding Lenna for ransom, while Faris' quick thinking allows her to make a rope-line to the opposing cliff so the party can get to their fallen friend. During the battle, Magissa assaults the party with her bow & arrow, and a considerable repertoire of magic attacks. Later in the battle, she summons Forza, who relies solely on brutal physical attacks. It is entirely possible for advanced players to defeat Magissa before Forza is even summoned.

=== Gogo ===
Gogo (ゴゴ) is a mimic searching for a fragment of the game's Wind Crystal that contains the "Mimic" character class. Appearing as a large jester, he will fight the protagonists in the submerged Walse Castle when they approach the crystal, challenging them to a mimicry duel. He will not attack directly, but will retaliate if the player does any actions. However, if they choose instead to wait, he'll congratulate them and retreat, giving them the crystal. Amano was given free range to make him "thin or fat", with production notes stating that he was intended to be the game's only comedic boss. Additionally, he was supposed to appear in a location called "Second Walse Tower", an area cut from the final game. Gogo later served as the inspiration for a similar character in Final Fantasy VI also named Gogo, whose design originally resembled his Final Fantasy V counterpart.

=== Melusine ===
Melusine (メリュジーヌ, Meryujīnu) is the first of the demons the heroes come in contact with after the worlds merge. Melusine is a beautiful woman riding a monstrous serpent creature. She was able to apprehend Lenna and possess her after Tycoon Castle was sucked into the Rift, but as the wind drake Hiryu made an attack on her, she lost control of Lenna. She has the power to change her elemental weaknesses and immunities with the ability Barrier Change.

=== Omega ===
Omega (オメガ) is an ancient war machine that descended from the sky, from a by-gone era still operating. It moves about by its own volition, unlike other boss enemies encountered in the Rift. Omega can be found meandering aimlessly around a waterfall somewhere in the Rift. Thankfully, Omega is an optional enemy, because it is incredibly powerful and requires substantial preparation to defeat. Defeating Omega earns Bartz and his team the Omega Badge, which serves no purpose other than bragging rights. An even stronger version called Omega Mk. II can be found in the new dungeon, bequeathing the Force Shield to anyone who would defeat it.

Omega has appeared in Final Fantasy games since as a recurring boss, most notably in Final Fantasy XIV where it appears as a character in its own right. It is first mentioned during a meeting between the player's Warrior of Light and Ul'dah's sultana Nanamo Ul Namo as a dormant Allagan superweapon surpassing the Ultima Weapon laying under the rubble of Carteneau Flats. The magnate Teledji Adeledji schemes to claim Omega for himself, but the Bloody Banquet that resulted in his death put a stop to his plans. In Heavensward, after Shinryu's summoning over Baelsar's Wall, the dishonored Garlean scientist Nero tol Scaeva proposes reactivating Omega as a means of countering Shinryu's threat. The Warrior of Light activates Omega, and it faces Shinryu, only for them to reach a stalemate with them falling into Ala Mhigo.

Omega is the main antagonist of its namesake raid series in Stormblood. Following Ala Mhigo's liberation, the Warrior and Garlond Ironworks investigate the crater where Omega fell into, where they are joined by Midgardsormr, who reveals that Omega is in reality an extraterrestrial being and not of Allagan creation as initially believed. They discover in its pocket dimension that it desires to evolve by facing off against powerful beings of its own creation, many of which are bosses from the "2D era" of Final Fantasy games (including Exdeath, Kefka, and Chaos). The Warrior enters this competition and is aided by Alpha, a cartoonish chocobo whom Omega regards as a failure in its experiments. Eventually, Omega reveals that its greatest desire is to return to its home planet and develop a heart, and faces off against the Warrior, but is defeated and apparently dies; short stories following the release of Shadowbringers reveal that it uploaded its consciousness into a miniature model resembling it that accompanies Alpha in exploring the world.

The miniature Omega appears in Endwalker, accompanying Alpha and the Ironworks to Old Sharlayan. The Scions of the Seventh Dawn later visit a recreation of its home planet, Alphatron, during their journey through Ultima Thule, and encounter recreations of its species, the Omicrons. Omega's survival is revealed to the Warrior of Light following the end of the Final Days, where Ironworks employees equipped its body with a voice so that it could communicate and aid them in decrypting an encrypted transmission from Alphatron. Omega journeys with the Warrior and Alpha to regions hit hardest by the Final Days to assess the people's experiences; while the answers it received are inconsistent, it is satisfied with its findings and decrypts the message, finding it to be one of hope and shared joy. Though no closer to the definitive answers it sought, it continues to explore the concepts of the mortal heart by remaining as Alpha's travelling companion. Omega is also fought as the main focus in The Omega Protocol (Ultimate) raid, an alternate scenario of the Omega raid series where its testing continued after its defeat. The Final Fantasy XIV incarnation of Omega has also appeared as a boss in Capcom's Monster Hunter Wilds as part of a crossover collaboration between both games.

=== Shinryu ===
Shinryu (神竜, Shinryū; "God Dragon") is an immensely powerful dragon that thrives within the Rift, mentioned as the Lord of Dragons. It first appears in Final Fantasy V protecting a particular chest near the end of the Dimensional Rift as the second super-boss in the game and grants Bartz's group both the Ragnarok Sword and the Dragon Seal. Neo Shinryu, a stronger version without any status vulnerabilities, appears in the new dungeon and holds the Ultima Weapon.

Shinryu plays an important part in the storyline of the Dissidia series of Final Fantasy. Having made a pact with Cid of the Lufaine to allow the conflict to occur, Shinryu takes both Cid's physical form and the memories of the losing group as payment while resetting the battlefield to repeat the latter action of absorbing memories endlessly until Cid breaks the cycle in the final conflict. As a result of the neutrality broken, Shinryu gives Chaos its power to summon so that he can fight the Warriors of Cosmos in the final battle.

Another version of Shinryu appears as a primal in Final Fantasy XIV. Introduced in the final scenario patch of the Heavensward expansion, Shinryu was created by the Ala Mhigan extremist Ilberd as part of a false flag operation engineered to force the Eorzean Alliance into war with the Garlean Empire, with his hatred of his countrymen's oppressors, the great wyrm Nidhogg's eyes, and the dying prayers of his followers, intending for it to raze the Empire with a calamity rivaling Bahamut's. The player's Warrior of Light activates the ancient war machine Omega to neutralize the threat, only for both to knock each other out over the Gyr Abania region. Later in Stormblood, Shinryu was captured by the Garlean crown prince Zenos yae Galvus, who assumes control of it to face the Warrior in combat, but is defeated, releasing Zenos who commits suicide, and Nidhogg's now-powerless eyes which are destroyed by Estinien to end Nidhogg's violent legacy. During the Omega raid series, following the Warrior's victory over Omega's recreation of Midgardsormr, Cid Garlond surmises that Shinryu's appearance did not originate from any existing belief system, but rather ancient depictions of the Father of Dragons. In Endwalker, Zenos assumes Shinryu's form again to assist the Warrior of Light against the Endsinger, and uses its abilities during his final confrontation against them.

A dragon known as Shinryu also appears in Bravely Default as an optional boss: this incarnation is found in Luxendarc's eastern reaches. He mainly uses the special attack Holy Breath, a light based breath attack that can also blind. Since he can also lower the party's light resistances with Celestial Eye, another special attack, engaging him in battle is a daunting prospect.

=== Enuo ===
Enuo (エヌオー, Enuō) is a powerful warlock that sought the power of the Void a thousand years prior to the start of the game to destroy the world. Originally immortal, he gave it up in order to obtain the Void, and warriors wielding twelve legendary weapons took advantage of his vulnerability to defeat him and seal him away. Originally only a backstory character, he was added as an optional final boss to the Game Boy Advance re-release of Final Fantasy V, appearing as a tall purple man with a long staff and tentacles wrapped around his body. His appearance was designed by Nomura, who incorporated elements of Exdeath's armor into his design.

In any early draft of Final Fantasy V's story, Exdeath sought to revive Enuo instead. In this version of the story, a branch from Exdeath would have merged with Enuo's body at the end of the game, creating Neo Exdeath. Another version of Enuo appears in Final Fantasy XIV as a boss in the Dawntrail expansion. This version of Enuo is a powerful voidsent that sought to invade the Source from the Thirteenth shard by taking advantage of the natural rejoining of shards in the aftermath of Hydaelyn's death in Endwalker, but they are stopped by the efforts of the Warrior of Light, Zero, and Golbez, with Zero sealing them in a memoria crystal and ending their invasion. Outside of video games, cards representing Enuo have been produced for the Final Fantasy Trading Card Game.

== Other characters ==
=== Boko ===
Boko (ボコ) is a chocobo, a type of yellow large flightless bird humans can ride that appear throughout the Final Fantasy franchise. A friend of Bartz's, the two travel together until the pirate cave, where he gets injured. After he's patched up, Boko waits there while the others travel. Later in the game Bartz discovers Boko now has a wife, Koko, and the two are expecting a child.

=== Cid and Mid Previa ===
Cid Previa (シド・プリヴィア, Shido Purivia) is an old engineer working for the kingdom of Karnak, who designed the machinery used to harness the energy of the elemental crystals to benefit the world, unaware it was actually damaging them. Though he attempts to help the party stop the fire crystal from shattering, they arrive too late, and he falls into depression. His bookworm grandson Mid Previa (ミド・プリヴィア, Mido Purivia) encourages him to continue helping however, and together they not only provide the protagonists with an airship, but later upgrade it, allowing it to transform into a submarine.

In Final Fantasy: Legend of the Crystals, an anime OVA sequel to Final Fantasy V, Cid dies shortly after the events of the game. The villain steals Cid's brain, planning to use it and the restored elemental crystals to conquer the world. Mid, killed defending his grandfather's grave and now a ghost, helps the protagonists trying to stop him. Mid's design was changed significantly, now resembling a young short boy without glasses, and is Mid is voiced by Julia Fletcher in English, while Etsuko Kozakura voices him in Japanese.

=== Dorgann Klauser ===
Dorgann Klauser (ドルガン・クラウザー, Dorugan Kurauzā) is the father of Bartz, and one of the warriors that originally sealed Exdeath in his world prior to the events of the game. Originally from Galuf's world, he opposed the decision to seal Exdeath, and chose to remain in Bartz's world to ensure Exdeath could not escape. After his wife died, he traveled with Bartz until he fell ill, and he dies three years prior to the start of Final Fantasy V.

=== Ghido ===
Ghido' (ギード, Gīdo) is a great sage turtle living in Galuf's world. Over seven hundred years old, he offers his wisdom to Bartz and his friends to help fight Exdeath, attracting the attention of the warlock himself. The two fight to a standstill, with Exdeath leaving in frustration. In an early version of the game's storyline, Ghido was supposed to be a thousand-year old sentient tree instead, and Exdeath's teacher.

Outside of video games, cards representing Ghido have been produced for the Final Fantasy Trading Card Game.

=== Kelger Vlondett ===
Kelger Vlondett (ケルガー・ヴロンデット, Kerugā Vurondetto) is a werewolf, and leads a tribe of similar werewolves. One of the warriors that originally sealed Exdeath in Bartz's world, upon encountering Bartz he mistakes him for an agent of Exdeath, though stops when he recognizes Bartz utilize a countermove Dorgann taught him. Realizing that Bartz is the son of his friend, he helps the group break through Castle Exdeath's illusionary field, thought is killed in the process. In an early version of Final Fantasy V, Kelger was a lizard man instead, and wielded a "dark sword".

=== King Tycoon ===
Alexander Highwind Tycoon (アレクサンダー・ハイウィンド・タイクーン, Arekusandā Haiwindo Taikūn), commonly known as King Tycoon, is the ruler of Tycoon Kingdom, and the father of Faris and Lenna. When he goes to investigate an unusual phenomenon at the shrine housing the Wind Crystal, his mind is taken over by Exdeath, who manipulates Tycoon into helping free him. After the Earth Crystal is shattered, he breaks free of the mind control, and sacrifices himself to save his daughters from Exdeath. Early in development, he was intended to be a mercenary prior to becoming king, and was given the kingdom by the previous king due to his leadership and popularity.

=== Syldra ===
Syldra (シルドラ, Shirudora) (Hydra in Anthology) is a sea serpent that pulled Faris' ship, and is like a sibling to her. After Faris joins with the party they are nearly consumed by a whirlpool, though Syldra manages to push them to safety before being sucked under. Syldra returns later on when the party is almost killed by the Tower of Walse location sinking into the ocean, using the last of her strength to carry them to safety before dying shortly after. Later in the game when Faris returns to her pirate cave, she finds Syldra's spirit, who lends Faris their power as an attack that can be summoned during battle.

In Japanese guide books published by Square Enix, Syldra's gender is masculine and is stated to be like a brother to Faris. In the Dark Horse Books translation of Final Fantasy Ultimania Archive Vol. 1 however, Syldra is instead referred to as female, and called Faris' friend. Early in development, Syldra was intended to be the boss encounter of the game's sunken Tower of Walse location if the player returned there later, something that would have created conflicting feelings in Faris.

In other games, Syldra was included as a mount available for players that purchased the collector's edition of the Stormblood expansion for Final Fantasy XIV. Outside of video games, cards representing Syldra have been produced for the Final Fantasy Trading Card Game.

=== Xezat Surgate ===
Xezat Matias Surgate, called Zezae Matias Surgate (ゼザ・マティアス・サーゲイト, Zeza Matiasu Sāgeito) in the original Japanese language versions, is one of the warriors that helped seal Exdeath in Bartz's world prior to the events of the game. The king of Surgat, he is called "Xezat of Ice" due to his cool demeanor, and fights on the front lines against Exdeath when he returns to their world. He is killed in a suicide mission to take down the barrier surrounding Castle Exdeath.

Xezat has appeared in other games in the Final Fantasy series, including Final Fantasy Record Keeper and Dissidia Final Fantasy Opera Omnia, where in the latter he is voiced by Takayuki Sugo.

=== Wind Drakes ===
Wind Drakes (飛竜, hiryū) are ride-able dragons found within the Final Fantasy V universe. Close to extinction, there is only one in each world: one in Castle Tycoon in Bartz's world, and one in Bal Castle in Galuf's world. When Lenna finds the Tycoon wind drake injured, she heals it back to health. It later returns the favor when Lenna is possessed by the monster Melusine, freeing her from its control but the drake is mortally wounded in the process. When Lenna find it again it chooses to die by throwing itself off Castle Tycoon, transforming into a Phoenix that can be summoned as an attack in battle.

Wind drakes were created with the intention of being the game's mascot, with a work order given to Amano to develop a logo incorporating them into the middle of the text as they had previously with the Final Fantasy IV logo and Kain Highwind.

== Characters introduced in Final Fantasy: Legend of the Crystals ==
The cast of Final Fantasy: Legend of the Crystals. The bottom row depicts Rouge, Valkus, Pretz, and returning character Mid, while Ra Devil holds Linally captive in the background.

Final Fantasy: Legend of the Crystals is a 1994 anime OVA sequel for Final Fantasy V, set centuries after the original game. The plot revolves around antagonist Ra Devil attempting to use the elemental crystals to become a god, with Bartz's descendant Linally and her fellow protagonists attempting to stop him. They receive additional help from the ghost of Mid, who was killed by Ra Devil when the latter stole Cid's brain from his grave. Produced by Madhouse, the character design was overseen by Yoshinori Kanemori.

=== Pretz ===
Pretz, called Prettz (プリッツ, Purittsu) in the original Japanese version, is a young boy and the protagonist of the OVA. He is described as a stubborn and reckless young man, and has feelings for Linally. He rides a motorcycle and uses explosives and a nodachi as weapons. When designing his character, they focused on giving him light clothing for ease of movement and an emphasis on his sword techniques. He is voiced by Matthew Kermit Miller in English and Rica Matsumoto in Japanese.

=== Linaly ===
Linally, called Linary (リナリー, Rinarī) in the original Japanese version, is a young woman with blue hair and a descendant of Bartz. A novice Summoner, a recurring character class in the Final Fantasy series, she is only able to summon chocobos to aid her. She becomes the vessel for the Wind Crystal after the other elemental crystals are stolen. When designing her, they wanted to portray her as an "open-minded heroine" who often showed "the shyness of a young girl". She is voiced by Sherry Lynn in English and Yuko Minaguchi in Japanese.

=== Valkus ===
Valkus (バルカス, Barukasu) is a large man and general of Tycoon's air force, commanding a giant airship called Iron Wing. Loyal to Tychoon's queen, he uses his imposing stature to intimidate others. Designed as a tall military figure with a large face, close-cut haircut, dark glasses and a slight bear, they wanted to portray his character as having a calm personality. However, when enraged, he has an "extreme" side where he attacks with dual machine guns. At the end of the story, after falling in love with Rouge at first sight he abandons his post and joins her troupe, wearing a male version of her henchman's outfit that was meant to give a "macho boy" look. He is voiced by John DeMita in English and Shigeru Chiba in Japanese.

=== Rouge ===
Rouge (ルージュ, Rūju) is a sky pirate captain infatuated with treasure. She initially attempts to take the Wind Crystal from Linally, only to be captured by Tycoon's forces. She is later pardoned on the condition of helping the protagonists defeat Ra Devil. Her henchman are tall muscular women that wear cat-themed black costumes, though have mismatching high pitched voices. Rouge was designed to be a "mature" woman with a bold costume, despite her role as a pirate. To this end she wears a revealing leather outfit, and fights with a whip. She is voiced by Kate T. Vogt in English and Fumi Hirano in Japanese.

=== Ra Devil ===
Ra Devil (ラーデビル, Rādebiru) is the OVA's main antagonist. He steals Cid's brain and the elemental crystals, seeking to use them to become a god being known as Deathgyunos (デスギュノス, Desugyunosu). Controlling a large air force of robots from his base "Black Moon", Ra Devil is a cyborg, with the upper half of his body organic and embedded into a large metal frame that also houses Cid's brain. After half of his body is destroyed, he absorbs the universe's energy to transform into Deathgyunos, with his organic elements strewn throughout his mechanical components. He is voiced by Michael Sorich in English and Kenichi Otaga in Japanese.

== Critical reception ==
The cast received mostly positive reception. Kazuma Hashimoto of Siliconera described them as "a colorful ensemble cast [...] filled with characters from various walks of life". They further praised how involved characters like Faris and Galuf made them invested into them, adding "these character archetypes manage to remain appealing even decades after its initial release". Connor Foss of TechRaptor compared the game in many ways to Final Fantasy III through its use of the job system, though emphasized that V's cast helped it stand apart because "the characters have...well, character. Final Fantasy V has an incredibly emotive cast." He further added that by comparison the characters always had "something funny or insightful to say, as opposed to the bland cast of III", and emphasized how that humor helped liven the tone from even its predecessor Final Fantasy IV. Jesse Lab of The Escapist also praised this lighter tone, stating that while the cast didn't drive the story it was a welcome change that wasn't present in many of the games in the series.

Exdeath by comparison received more mixed reception. Jason Schreier in an article for Kotaku criticized the character as "a being of pure, boring evil", and that while "looking cool" lacked the same appeal as later franchise villains Kefka Palazzo and Sephiroth. A similar sentiment was shared by Alana Hagues of RPGFan, who felt Exdeath lacked "any meaning other than being an imposing, all-powerful warlock", and without the grace or presence of villain characters in the franchise that came before him, it was primarily his henchman Gilgamesh that made up for his role as a "lackluster" antagonist. However, other outlets such as Nathan Schlothan of RPGamer praised him as being the series' "first great villain" due to how ever-present he was in the game and driving the story forward, while Inverse's Hayes Madsen praised the character's simplicity of being "a really bad dude" in light of other more overly complex villains in the Final Fantasy series, and felt Exdeath instead illustrated the depths a villain would go to "see the world burn".

Reception towards the cast of Legend of the Crystals was more negative. Richard Eisenbeis of Kotaku Australia criticized how the cast of the original game was treated in its story. He additionally criticized the sexualization of Linally and Rouge, stating "the fan service isn’t sexy and the humour isn’t funny. So what is the point?" THEM Anime Reviews reviewers Raphael See and Sam Yu both criticized the writing of the characters as "everyone was magically transformed into flaming idiots", further criticizing their designs and stating they frequently found themselves averting their gaze. Fellow reviewer Carlos/Giancarla Ross specifically criticized the villain in turn, calling Deathgyunos "a lame attempt to recreate the Overfiend using random materials scavenged from a junkyard."
