= Exdeath =

Antagonist in Final Fantasy V

- Final Fantasy character
- Exdeath, as seen in Dissidia Final Fantasy (concept art by Tetsuya Nomura)
- First game: Final Fantasy V (1992)
- Created by: Hironobu Sakaguchi
- Designed by: Yoshitaka Amano; Tetsuya Nomura (Neo Exdeath)
- Voiced by: English: Gerald C. Rivers; Japanese: Tarō Ishida; Naomi Kusumi

In-universe information
- Race: Tree

Exdeath (Japanese: エクスデス, Hepburn: Ekusudesu) is the main antagonist of the 1992 Square role-playing video game Final Fantasy V. Created by Hironobu Sakaguchi, the warlock Exdeath is a sentient tree that has taken on a humanoid form, seeking to control the power of the Void. Though he is able to obtain it, while fighting the protagonists it consumes him as well, and he re-emerges as a being known as Neo Exdeath. Exdeath has since appeared in various other titles and promotions related to the Final Fantasy franchise, including the Dissidia Final Fantasy games, where he is voiced by Gerald C. Rivers in English and Tarō Ishida in Japanese, with Naomi Kusumi later taking over the latter's role after Ishida's death.

Commentary on Exdeath has generally been mixed, with many being mixed as to his role. Though some praised his role in the games, he has also been criticized for being a straightforwardly evil villain. He has also been subject to literary analysis, examining the themes of the character in the context of mankind's misuse of the environment and the use of horror within the franchise.

== Appearances ==
As introduced in the 1992 role playing game Final Fantasy V, Exdeath was originally a tree which the people of that world had used to seal countless demons and evil spirits in for centuries, until eventually the tree developed sentience from all the evil it had contained and assumed a humanoid form. Emerging as a powerful warlock, Exdeath was defeated 30 years prior to the events of the game, and sealed in a parallel world by its four elemental crystals. However, at the start of the game, society's overreliance on energy from the crystals has weakened the seal. Despite the efforts of protagonist Bartz and the other heroes, he eventually frees himself and returns to his own world with the heroes in pursuit.

Returning to his castle, he sets his underling Gilgamesh upon the heroes and captures all but the character Galuf, and uses them as hostages. With Galuf's help the heroes manage to escape, but Exdeath later tricks them into destroying his world's own elemental crystals and kills Galuf in the ensuing battle. The destruction of the crystals later causes his world and the parallel world to recombine. Furthermore, it grants him access to a destructive force had been sealed away by the world being split, the Void. Transforming into a giant tree, Exdeath uses the Void to attack and devastate the world. The heroes fight back, and in the ensuing battle the Void consumes him instead. He re-emerges as Neo Exdeath, aiming to destroy all reality so he can disappear as well, only to be defeated by the heroes for good.

Exdeath later appeared in the Square Enix fighting game Dissidia Final Fantasy and its subsequent sequels. In all appearances the character is voiced by Gerald C. Rivers in English and Tarō Ishida in Japanese, with Naomi Kusumi taking over for the latter after the actor's death. Rivers appreciated being able to play a villain and the character's philosophy, seeing him as someone that didn't fear death and had a deep understanding of the universe's working. Ishida meanwhile approached the role as if he was "a great tree" with its roots stuck into the ground, an approach Kusumi tried to emulate, though admitted he struggled with how powerful Ishida had made Exdeath's laughter.

In other games, Exdeath has appeared as a playable character in various titles including Theatrhythm: Final Bar Line, Final Fantasy Record Keeper, Final Fantasy Brave Exvius, and Yo-kai Watch: Wibble Wobble, the last of which as part of a Dissidia related crossover event for the game. Neo Exdeath meanwhile appears as a boss in a Final Fantasy themed crossover with Puzzle & Dragons, and both make an appearance in Final Fantasy XIV as a boss for the game's Deltascape raid, with Exdeath transforming into Neo Exdeath halfway through the fight on its Savage difficulty setting. Outside of video games, cards for Exdeath and Neo Exdeath have also been made for the Final Fantasy Trading Card Game and Magic: The Gathering.

== Conception and design ==
For Final Fantasy V, artist Tetsuya Nomura frequently utilized the concept of a monster wearing the face of a beautiful woman, a trait carried over for many of the merged monsters in Neo Exdeath.

Created by Hironobu Sakaguchi, Exdeath's ambition of reducing the world to a state of nonexistence was part of a trend of Sakaguchi's to try and blend science fiction with the fantasy roleplaying game concept, touching upon his interest in the vast nothingness of space. In the earliest drafts of Final Fantasy V's story, Exdeath was originally a student of the sage Guido, and sought to revive the being Enuo, an incarnation of pure evil that controlled the Void. In the climax, a branch from Exdeath would enter Enuo's body, resulting in the creation of a Neo Exdeath who would have had Exdeath's mind but Enuo's power.

The character designs were commissioned from artist Yoshitaka Amano, who did several drafts for both Exdeath and Neo Exdeath. Exdeath appears as a tall broad knight in light blue armor with gold and purple trimmings, a sash around the waist, and a light blue cape. While his horned helmet is closed, his hands are partially exposed showing his skin to be a bluish white. Horns protrude from the armor particularly the pauldrons, and he uses a curved golden sword with a long hilt. Early concept art showed Exdeath as a large horned black centaur with a cape and a sword. Artist Tetsuya Nomura redesigned Neo Exdeath when drawing concept art for the in-game sprites, basing the front of the body off of Amano's artwork, but adding countless monsters and figures merged into its lower half. However, they were almost unable to include the character in the final game, due to overestimating the amount of cartridge space available.

When designing his appearance for the Dissidia Final Fantasy games, they kept close to Amano's designs for his base appearance, while his "EX mode" version was meant to be more tree inspired, with roots and bark covering his armor and the horns of his helmet resembling branches, while his cape appeared to be ragged and made of thin bark. In Dissidia 012 Final Fantasy, a third outfit was added showing Exdeath unarmored. This version appeared as a large, muscular man with large yellow horns protruding from his head, a blue cape, a black bodysuit covering his body with a winged headpiece, and a yellow sash around his waist. The design was meant to reflect Amano's artwork of the monsters for Final Fantasy V, with the upper body of the EX mode version modeled after the front portion of Neo Exdeath.

The name Exdeath derives from the term "one who transcends death". His name has been localized in some iterations to X-Death, Ex-Death, or Exodus, the last of which has been attributed to prior fan-made localizations of Final Fantasy V.

== Promotion and reception ==
Exdeath's image was used as part of a cross promotion between Square Enix and Cup Noodles in 2017 as part of a celebration of the Final Fantasy franchise's 30th anniversary. In merchandise, a non-posable statue of Exdeath was released as part of the fourth wave of Square Enix's Creatures KAI figure line. A "minion" companion character of Exdeath that follows players around was also released as an in-game item for Final Fantasy XIV.

Since his debut, Exdeath received mixed reception, in particular regarding to his role as a villain. Jason Schreier in an article for Kotaku criticized the character as "a being of pure, boring evil", and that while "looking cool" lacked the same appeal as later franchise villains Kefka Palazzo and Sephiroth. A similar sentiment was shared by Alana Hagues of RPGFan, who felt Exdeath lacked "any meaning other than being an imposing, all-powerful warlock", and without the grace or presence of villain characters in the franchise that came before him, it was primarily his henchman Gilgamesh that made up for his role as a "lackluster" antagonist.

Jonathan Remoiville in his book La Légende Final Fantasy IV & V described Exdeath as "not really a villain who plays on subtlety", and one of the last truly evil antagonists in the Final Fantasy franchise. He stated though this lack of nuance did not make the character uninteresting however, as during the course of the story he becomes a gradually growing threat, and once unleashed he proves to be a formidable and capable enemy. Remoiville noted that Exdeath even temporarily achieves his goal of reducing the world to nothingness, its restoration only capable due to the virtues the heroes represent. Remoiville wrote that as Exdeath was unambiguously evil and nihilistic, defeating him made little impact on the player, and reduced the emotional impact of the game as a whole. He felt for games to succeed they need not only strong heroes but also a strong villain, and that was not the case with Final Fantasy V.

Inverse's Hayes Madsen on the other hand praised the character, stating that Exdeath was a perfect example of a "villain who's a real bad dude, nothing more". He noted that in terms of Final Fantasy V, his existence as a tree fit perfectly with how the game's story could be both lighthearted and serious at times. While Madsen noted that Exdeath lacked deeper motivations outside of destruction and evil, it in turn allowed him to be "the perfect foil" to the protagonists who he felt were also not developed much beyond simple themes. He further enjoyed the simplicity, stating that while "angsty villains" would always have a place in the franchise, Exdeath's character was closer to that of the Green Goblin in Sam Raimi's Spider-Man, or the portrayal of the Joker in The Dark Knight: characters that want to "see the world burn, and the fun is in seeing the depths the villains sink to in order to do that."

While Nathan Schlothan of RPGamer felt that Exdeath was never a popular character within the fandom, he described him as the Final Fantasy "first great villain" and his favorite one in video games overall. He noted that prior the villains of the series tended to "come out of nowhere" only to be defeated by the heroes in the last few moments of the game. Exdeath on the other hand was a persistent threat in Schlothan's eyes, and one that he felt later Final Fantasy antagonists thrived by following in that style. He acknowledged that though the character lacked personality, his presence at almost every major event in the game pushing the world closer to destruction made him work "wonderfully as a villain simply by being competent and threatening" and helped set him apart from other characters in the same "dark lord" archetype common to such games.

The character's themes were also explored by various publications. Despite his earlier criticism, Remoiville praised Exdeath's role as "nature taking a monstrous form to attack humanity" for its overreliance on its resources and machines, a "form of irony" he felt series creator Hironobu Sakaguchi "mastered wonderfully". He compared Exdeath to Norse mythology's Yggdrasil as a sacred tree, and how the former became an "unholy tree which links the world of Bartz and that of Galuf to reunite them in death". Author Deanna Khamis meanwhile praised Exdeath as an example of the Final Fantasy series creating villains more sophisticated than "the producers suspect", further describing him as a hollow but "richly decorated [...] perfect horror, empty and shapeless in essence, but defined or even overdefined by the colourful pink, green and golden shell" in titles such as Dissidia.

Michael Greenhut in the book Final Fantasy Villains: From FF1 to FF16 described him as a "big old ball of pure evil that just wants to conquer and destroy". He compared the character's voice in the Dissidia games to that of Shredder, an antagonist in the Teenage Mutant Ninja Turtles franchise, and more directly felt that Exdeath came across as a 1980's cartoon villain in how shallow his overall goals were in that there was little to him besides "evil, destruction, gloating, and threats". In this scope, he saw his motivations as more boastful than anything, and felt those drawn to him were more after power and what they themselves could do with it, comparing him to the One Ring from Tolkien's Lord of the Rings novels than its creator, Sauron. In regards to his final form, Greenhut shared Remoiville's comparison to Yggdrassil, though in the sense that it was a bastardization of something more natural.
