= Tarō Ishida =

Japanese actor and voice actor (1944–2013)

- 石田 太郎
- Born: Gentarō Ishida; March 16, 1944; Kyoto, Kyoto Prefecture, Japan
- Died: September 21, 2013 (aged 69); Sagamihara, Kanagawa, Japan
- Occupations: Actor, voice actor
- Years active: 1960–2013
- Spouse(s): Fusako Tachibana (? - 2006, her death)
- Parent: Shigeki Ishida
- Website: Granpapa

Tarō Ishida (石田 太郎, Ishida Tarō; March 16, 1944 – September 21, 2013), born Gentarō Ishida (石田 弦太郎, Ishida Gentarō), was a Japanese actor, voice actor, and Shin Buddhist priest from the city of Kyoto. He was affiliated with Granpapa Production.

== Biography ==
Ishida was born in Kyoto, Japan on March 16, 1944, the son of actor Shigeki Ishida. He attended the Foreign Language Department (Spanish) of Sophia University, but quit without graduating. Ishida was also a chief priest at the Jōdo Shinshū Buddhist temple Jōkei-ji at Kanazawa, Ishikawa.

He was married to actress Fusako Tachibana until her death in 2006.

Ishida died on September 21, 2013, from myocardial infarction.

== Filmography ==
=== Films ===
Year	Title	Role	Notes
1988	A Taxing Woman's Return	Kiyohara	
1989	Violent Cop	Detective Tomosato	
1990	Heaven and Earth	Takeda Nobushige	
1993	A Touch of Fever	Yoriko's Father	
1996	Oishinbo	Koizumi	
1998	Pride	Akira Mutō	
1998	Ikinai	Noguchi	
2001	Godzilla, Mothra and King Ghidorah: Giant Monsters All-Out Attack	SDF Officer	
2004	Quill	Hiroshi Totsuka	
2006	Doomsday: The Sinking of Japan	Minister of Defense Seigo Umezu	
2008	Departures	Sonezaki	
2009	Asahiyama Zoo Story: Penguins in the Sky	City Council Member	

=== Television dramas ===
Year	Title	Role	Notes
1983	Oshin		
1984	Sanga Moyu		
1986	Musashibō Benkei	Kajiwara Kagetoki	
1987	Dokuganryū Masamune	Nihonmatsu Yoshitsugu	
1989	Kasuga no Tsubone	Ōkubo Tadachika	
1998	Shomuni	Kato	
2000	Aoi	Ōkubo Tadachika	
2007	The Family	Yasuda	

=== Television animation ===
Year	Title	Role	Notes
1980	Time Patrol-Tai Otasukeman	Napoleon	
2001	Lupin III: Alcatraz Connection	Assistant Inspector Terry Crown	
2002	Detective Conan	Police Inspector Radish Redwood	
2003	Requiem from the Darkness	Emon Shibamigi	
2004	Astro Boy: Mighty Atom	Duke Red	
2004	Black Jack	Toranomon	
2007	GeGeGe no Kitarō	Vampire Elite Johnny	Fifth series
2012–2013	Space Brothers	Deneil Young	

=== Original video animation (OVA) ===
Year	Title	Role	Notes
1990–1991	Record of Lodoss War	Emperor Beld	
1994–1996	Legend of the Galactic Heroes	Heydrich Lang (second voice)	
1995	Bio Hunter	Tabu	
1995–1998	Giant Robo	Demon King of Chaos Fan Rui	
1999	Harlock Saga	Wotan	

=== Theatrical animation ===
Year	Title	Role	Notes
1979	Lupin III: The Castle of Cagliostro	Count Cagliostro	
1982	Arcadia of My Youth	Zeda	
1983	Final Yamato	Lugal	
1985	The Dagger of Kamui	Tenkai, Saigō Takamori	
1985	Odin: Photon Sailer Starlight	Saint Asgard	As "Gentarō Ishida
1986	Fist of the North Star	Narrator	
1988	Akira	Colonel Shikishima	
1989	Little Nemo: Adventures in Slumberland	Nightmare King	
1997	Case Closed: The Time-Bombed Skyscraper	Teiji Moriya	
1998	Crayon Shin-chan: Blitzkrieg! Pig's Hoof's Secret Mission	Mouse	
2001	Metropolis	Duke Red	
2003	One Piece: Dead End Adventure	Gasparde	
2006	Brave Story	Bishop Daimon	

=== Tokusatsu ===
Year	Title	Role	Notes
1984	Ultraman Story	Father of Ultra	
2003	Kamen Rider 555	Joji Soeno	
2007	Juken Sentai Gekiranger	Kentaro Hisatsu	

=== Video games ===
Year	Title	Role	Notes
2001	Adventure of Tokyo Disney Sea ~Losing of Jewel's secret	King Triton	
2002	Kingdom Hearts	King Triton	
2005	Kingdom Hearts II	King Triton, Eeyore	
2008	Dissidia: Final Fantasy	Exdeath	
2011	Dissidia 012 Final Fantasy	Exdeath	

=== Dubbing roles ===
==== Live-action ====
Original Year	Title	Role	Original actor	Notes	Refs
1957	The Bridge on the River Kwai	Colonel Saito	Sessue Hayakawa		
1959	Ben-Hur	Ben-Hur	Charlton Heston	1979 Nippon TV edition	
1962	Lawrence of Arabia	Colonel Harry Brighton	Anthony Quayle	1981 TV Asahi edition	
1973	The Sting	Lieutenant William Snyder	Charles Durning	1991 TV Asahi edition	
1977	The Domino Principle	Roy Tucker	Gene Hackman		
1979	The Amityville Horror	George Lutz	James Brolin	1982 NTV edition	
1979	Apocalypse Now	Colonel Walter E. Kurtz	Marlon Brando		
1980	The Empire Strikes Back	Darth Vader	James Earl Jones	1992 TV Asahi edition	
1980	The Shining	Jack Torrance	Jack Nicholson	1996 TV Tokyo edition	
1980	Superman II	Lex Luthor	Gene Hackman	1984 TV Asahi edition	
1981	The Cannonball Run	Doctor Nikolas Van Helsing	Jack Elam	1984 Fuji TV edition	
1981	Raiders of the Lost Ark	René Belloq	Paul Freeman	1993 DVD edition	
1982	Conan the Barbarian	Thulsa Doom	James Earl Jones	1985 Nippon TV edition	
1982	48 Hrs.	Jack Cates	Nick Nolte	1985 Nippon TV edition, as "Gentarō Ishida	
1982	First Blood	Sheriff Will Teasle	Brian Dennehy	1985 NTV, 1990 TBS and 1995 TV Asahi editions	
1983	Cannonball Run II	Doctor Nikolas Van Helsing	Jack Elam		
1983	Project A	San	Dick Wei		
1983	Scarface	Frank Lopez	Robert Loggia	1989 TV Asahi edition	
1983	Under Fire	Alex Grazier	Gene Hackman		
1984	Indiana Jones and the Temple of Doom	Mola Ram	Amrish Puri	1987 Nippon TV edition	
1984	The NeverEnding Story	Falkor, Gmork	Alan Oppenheimer		
1985	Cocoon	Walter	Brian Dennehy		
1985	Commando	Bennett	Vernon Wells		
1987	The Running Man	Damon Killian	Richard Dawson	1989 Fuji TV edition	
1987	No Way Out	Defense Secretary David Brice	Gene Hackman	TV Tokyo edition	
1988	Mississippi Burning	Agent Rupert Anderson	Gene Hackman	1992 TV Asahi edition	
1989	The Package	Sgt. Johnny Gallagher	Gene Hackman	1993 TBS edition	
1989	K-9	Lyman	Kevin Tighe	1993 TV Asahi edition	
1989	The Punisher	Jake Berkowitz	Louis Gossett Jr.		
1989	Columbo	Lt. Columbo	Peter Falk	Season 8~	
1990	Dances with Wolves	Kicking Bird	Graham Greene		
1990	Die Hard 2	Trudeau	Fred Thompson	1994 TV Asahi edition	
1990	Loose Cannons	MacArthur Stern	Gene Hackman		
1990	Postcards from the Edge	Lowell Kolchek	Gene Hackman		
1990	Narrow Margin	Robert Caulfield	Gene Hackman		
1991	Class Action	Jedediah Tucker Ward	Gene Hackman		
1991	Armour of God II: Operation Condor	Adolf	Aldo Sambrell	1993 Fuji TV edition	
1991	The Silence of the Lambs	Hannibal Lecter	Anthony Hopkins	1995 TV Asahi edition	
1992	Alien 3	Leonard Dillon	Charles S. Dutton	1998 TV Asahi edition	
1992	Batman Returns	Oswald Cobblepot/The Penguin	Danny DeVito	1994 TV Asahi edition	
1992	Unforgiven	Little Bill Daggett	Gene Hackman		
1993	Geronimo: An American Legend	Brig. Gen. George Crook	Gene Hackman		
1993	This Boy's Life	Dwight Hansen	Robert De Niro		
1994	Wyatt Earp	Nicholas Earp	Gene Hackman	1997 TV Tokyo edition	
1995	Crimson Tide	Captain Frank Ramsey	Gene Hackman		
1995	The Quick and the Dead	John Herod	Gene Hackman		
1995	Die Hard with a Vengeance	Inspector Walter Cobb	Larry Bryggman	1998 Fuji TV edition	
1996	The Birdcage	Senator Kevin Keeley	Gene Hackman	2000 Fuji TV edition	
1996	The Chamber	Sam Cayhall	Gene Hackman		
1996	Extreme Measures	Dr. Lawrence Myrick	Gene Hackman		
1997	Absolute Power	President Alan Richmond	Gene Hackman		
1997	Men in Black	Chief Zed	Rip Torn	2001 Nippon TV edition	
1997	Cop Land	Ray Donlan	Harvey Keitel	2000 Nippon TV edition	
1998	Godzilla	Mayor Ebert	Michael Lerner	2001 NTV edition	
1998	Enemy of the State	Edward "Brill" Lyle	Gene Hackman	2003 Fuji TV edition	
2000	Under Suspicion	Henry Hearst	Gene Hackman		
2000	Gone in 60 Seconds	Detective Roland Castlebeck	Delroy Lindo		
2001	Evolution	Brigadier General Russell Woodman	Ted Levine	2005 NTV edition	
2001	Behind Enemy Lines	Admiral Leslie McMahon Reigart	Gene Hackman		
2001	Heist	Joe Moore	Gene Hackman		
2001	The Royal Tenenbaums	Royal Tenenbaum	Gene Hackman		
2001	Hannibal	Hannibal Lecter	Anthony Hopkins		
2002	Red Dragon	Hannibal Lecter	Anthony Hopkins	2006 TV Tokyo edition	
2002	The Lord of the Rings: The Two Towers	Treebeard	John Rhys-Davies		
2002	Men in Black II	Chief Zed	Rip Torn	2005 TV Asahi edition	
2002	Undisputed	Mendy Ripstein	Peter Falk		
2002	About Schmidt	Warren R. Schmidt	Jack Nicholson		
2003	Runaway Jury	Rankin Fitch	Gene Hackman		
2003	Big Fish	Old Edward Bloom	Albert Finney		
2004	Saw	Jigsaw	Tobin Bell		
2005	Saw II	Jigsaw	Tobin Bell		
2005	Batman Begins	William Earle	Rutger Hauer		
2005	Batman Begins	Carmine Falcone	Tom Wilkinson	2007 Nippon TV edition	
2005	Brokeback Mountain	Joe Aguirre	Randy Quaid		
2006	The Departed	Frank Costello	Jack Nicholson		
2006	ER	Richard Elliot	Armand Assante		
2006	Saw III	Jigsaw	Tobin Bell		
2007	Saw IV	Jigsaw	Tobin Bell		
2007	Next	Irv	Peter Falk		
2007	Sleuth	Andrew Wyke	Michael Caine		
2009	The Imaginarium of Doctor Parnassus	Doctor Parnassus	Christopher Plummer		
2009	The City of Your Final Destination	Adam Gund	Anthony Hopkins		
2010	Beginners	Hal Fields	Christopher Plummer		
2010	Green Zone	Martin Brown	Brendan Gleeson		
2010	Robin Hood	Sir Walter Loxley	Max von Sydow		
2012	Silent Hill: Revelation	Leonard Wolf	Malcolm McDowell		
2012	The Raven	Captain Charles Hamilton	Brendan Gleeson		
2013	The Smurfs 2	Victor Doyle	Brendan Gleeson		
2013	Red 2	Ivan Simanov	Brian Cox		

==== Animation ====
Original Year	Title	Role	Original actor	Notes	Refs
1953	Peter Pan	Indian Chief	Candy Candido	Buena Vista edition	
1981	The Fox and the Hound	Adult Copper	Kurt Russell		
1988	Oliver and Company	Bill Sykes	Robert Loggia		
1989	The Little Mermaid	King Triton	Kenneth Mars	Re-release edition	
1997	Pooh's Grand Adventure: The Search for Christopher Robin	Eeyore	Peter Cullen		
2000	The Little Mermaid II: Return to the Sea	King Triton	Kenneth Mars		
2000	The Tigger Movie	Eeyore	Peter Cullen		
2001–2003	The Book of Pooh	Eeyore	Peter Cullen		
2004	Shark Tale	Don Feinberg	Peter Falk		
2011	Cars 2	Mel Dorado	Patrick Walker		
2013	Planes	Skipper Riley	Stacy Keach		

==== Japanese voiceover ====
Opening Year	Title	Role	Notes	Refs
1983	Peter Pan's Flight	Indian Chief		
2000	Pooh's Hunny Hunt	Eeyore		
