= Dissidia Final Fantasy =

2008 video game

- North American box art featuring the protagonists from the first ten Final Fantasy games
- Developer: Square Enix
- Publisher: Square Enix
- Director: Takeshi Arakawa
- Producer: Yoshinori Kitase
- Designer: Mitsunori Takahashi
- Programmer: Ryuji Ikeda
- Artist: Takayuki Odachi
- Writers: Daisuke Watanabe; Harunori Sakemi; Motomu Toriyama
- Composer: Takeharu Ishimoto
- Series: Final Fantasy
- Platform: PlayStation Portable
- Release: JP: December 18, 2008; NA: August 25, 2009; AU: September 3, 2009; EU: September 4, 2009; Universal Tuning: JP: November 1, 2009
- Genres: Fighting, action role-playing
- Modes: Single-player, multiplayer

Dissidia Final Fantasy (Note: Japanese: ディシディア ファイナルファンタジー, Hepburn: Dishidia Fainaru Fantajī) is a 2008 fighting game developed and published by Square Enix for the PlayStation Portable. It was released in Japan on December 18, 2008, in North America on August 25, 2009, and in Australia and Europe in September, as part of the campaign for the Final Fantasy series's 20th anniversary. It was then re-released in Japan, based on the North American version, as Dissidia Final Fantasy: Universal Tuning, on November 1, 2009.

The game features characters from different Final Fantasy games and centers on a great conflict between Cosmos, the goddess of harmony, and Chaos, the god of discord. The two summon multiple warriors to fight for their sides in their thirteenth war. During the story, the player controls the ten warriors chosen by Cosmos, the protagonists from the first ten Final Fantasy games, in their journey. The game's English and international versions give access to other features such as an arcade mode.

Dissidia originated from Kingdom Hearts director Tetsuya Nomura's desire to create a spin-off for the franchise, which was later changed to the Final Fantasy series. Besides designing the characters, Nomura worked with the Square staff with the desire to make it appealing to Western players. Dissidia was well-received commercially and critically, with positive reviews and sales of over 1.8 million. A follow-up titled Dissidia 012 Final Fantasy was released in March 2011, featuring several new characters and gameplay elements.

== Gameplay ==
A fight from Dissidia Final Fantasy featuring Zidane Tribal and Sephiroth

Dissidia Final Fantasy's genre has been described as "dramatic progressive action" and its graphics are in 3D. It has wireless one-on-one multiplayer and fights revolving around the use of individual special skills of characters to do damage to opponents. Players can customize their characters with equipment.

Character movement is fully functional within the three-dimensional field map. Characters are able to perform special maneuvers using the environment. Traps with a variety of ill effects can be found throughout the arena. Characters' equipment can be customized, and they can gain EXP and gil from battles.

The aim is for the player to reduce their opponent's HP to zero. A character's offensive (and, to a lesser extent, defensive) power is shown in numerical form called BRV or "Bravery Points". Both characters start out with a set amount of BRV, and each must reduce their health to 0 by attacking them with a HP attack. Players can steal BRV from their opponent by attacking them with the basic "BRV attack" to add it to their own total and gain the upper hand. Players can then use the "HP attack" to cause direct damage to their opponent; HP damage is equal to the player's current amount of Bravery. However, once an HP attack is used, the character's own BRV is reduced to 0 and then slowly recovers to its starting amount. A character whose BRV total has been depleted (past 0 BRV and into the negatives) is forced into "Break mode", where, aside from not being able to cause HP and BRV damage (but being able to gain BRV), all attacks made against them cause critical damage and the opponent gets all of the BRV in the "Bravery Pool" (a number that can be seen at the bottom of the screen), massively boosting their BRV amount.

One main feature of the combat system is the "EX Gauge", which can be filled in a variety of ways, such as inflicting damage on opponents, taking damage from opponents, and obtaining EX cores scattered around the field of play. Once the EX Gauge is filled, the character can enter their "EX Mode", significantly increasing their power and enabling new attacks, including the "EX Burst", an unavoidable and very damaging special attack similar to the Limit Break mechanic seen in many games in the series. The player on the offense charges up the attack by following the on-screen instructions, while the player on the defense can reduce the amount of damage taken by continuously pressing the circle button. Once the EX Burst is executed, EX Mode ends.

In a gameplay mode exclusive to Western releases, the Arcade mode converts the game in a traditional fighting game, with all role-playing elements removed and characters' abilities being stripped down to the basics to balance the playing field. Within the Arcade Mode, there are three tiers: Normal, Hard, and Time Attack; beating any tier of the Arcade mode will reward the player with PP (player points) and special items that can be used in story mode. All characters, including villains, are playable in Arcade mode; for example, Golbez, Sephiroth, Kuja, and Jecht are available for use in this mode from the start, but they still need to be bought via the PP Catalog for use in other modes.

== Plot ==
=== Setting and characters ===
The story revolves around two gods: Cosmos, (Note: コスモス, Kosumosu) the goddess of harmony, and Chaos, (Note: カオス, Kaosu) the god of discord. The game unites both protagonists and antagonists from installments of the main Final Fantasy series, their stories narrated by the first Final Fantasy game's Cid of the Lufaine. Other than the gods and their champions, the player deals with crystal-like doppelgangers called Manikins. The game has an overarching storyline that requires playing through all of the characters to complete. The game contains twenty-two total playable characters, with ten pairs of heroes and villains each representing a mainline Final Fantasy title: the Warrior of Light and Garland (Final Fantasy); Firion and the Emperor (Final Fantasy II); the Onion Knight and Cloud of Darkness (Final Fantasy III); Cecil Harvey and Golbez (Final Fantasy IV); Bartz Klauser and Exdeath (Final Fantasy V); Terra Branford and Kefka Palazzo (Final Fantasy VI); Cloud Strife and Sephiroth (Final Fantasy VII); Squall Leonhart and Ultimecia (Final Fantasy VIII); Zidane Tribal and Kuja (Final Fantasy IX); and Tidus and Jecht (Final Fantasy X). The other two are secret characters: Shantotto, a heroine representing Final Fantasy XI, and Gabranth, a villain representing Final Fantasy XII. Initially, only the main heroes are playable in all gameplay modes; the main villains are playable in Arcade mode, but must still be unlocked for access in all other gameplay modes.

=== Story mode ===
Cosmos and Chaos have been locked in eternal conflict with "World B", a mirror dimension to the realm of "World A" where the first Final Fantasy takes place. The two gods summon several warriors from other worlds from the main series to battle in a never-ending cycle of death and rebirth until the balance is tipped in favor of Chaos. As the war seems to be nearing its end, the ten warriors of Cosmos band together to strike back at Chaos's minions and restore balance. Having lost much of her power in the previous cycle, Cosmos gives her ten warriors the task of retrieving the ten crystals that will help them defeat Chaos. They each set out on a journey called a "Destiny Odyssey", where their respective stories are told and interlink with one another. During their travels the heroes encounter their villains, defeating them through epiphanies about themselves that help them obtain their crystals.

Following the "Destiny Odysseys" is the "Shade Impulse", where all ten warriors have their crystals but arrive too late to save Cosmos, who is killed by Chaos. The heroes begin to fade away but are saved by the power of the crystals, allowing them to use what time they have left to strike back against the villains and defeat Chaos. In the end, the warriors leave for their respective worlds while Cosmos revives to reign over World B.

The game features two other storylines with "Distant Glory", where Shanttoto and Gabranth are introduced to the player in two different areas where they are trapped and have to find a way out. The other story mode, "Inward Chaos", serves as an alternate scenario in which Chaos has never been defeated and the player is guided by an entity known as Shinryu to defeat Chaos.

== Development ==
Dissidia Final Fantasy was originally envisioned by creative producer Tetsuya Nomura as a Kingdom Hearts spin-off featuring a cast of Disney characters while the Square Enix staff were developing Kingdom Hearts II. Nomura later felt uncomfortable with the Disney characters fighting each other and instead opted to use Final Fantasy characters, although the original idea eventually gave rise to the development of Kingdom Hearts 358/2 Days, with the game's multiplayer mode inspired by Dissidia's gameplay. The game was made in commemoration of the franchise's 20th anniversary and despite being handled by young employees, Nomura noticed there was no pressure, having assisted them in the designing various areas from the gameplay. The game was directed by Takeshi Arakawa whom Nomura noted that his experience in a previous Square Enix game, The World Ends With You, had a good effect in the game. To have their desired way of fighting, the team chose the PlayStation Portable console. There were plans for online play but the console's capacities made them unable to add such a feature. Developing the game took three years due with the battle system requiring two years and the RPG mode one.

Deciding the Final Fantasy heroes was easy for the staff except for Terra Branford. While her game, Final Fantasy VI, features multiple characters that would fit the role of the main character, Terra was chosen in the end so that there would be a female fighter on Cosmos' side. For villains, they decided to include warriors who had a strong rivalry with the heroes rather than automatically choosing the games' final bosses. This resulted in the inclusion of non-final bosses such as Final Fantasy IV's Golbez, IX's Kuja and X's Jecht who were connected with their games' leads (Cecil Harvey, Zidane Tribal and Tidus, respectively). Shantotto from XI was used based on her popularity, while Gabranth was used to represent XII in Balthier's place as the latter had already been featured in Final Fantasy Tactics: War of the Lions and Square wanted his inclusion to surprise gamers. Other characters meant to have been featured were Final Fantasy IV's Kain Highwind and XIII's Lightning.

Nomura was responsible for the character designs, which changed much of the look and style of Yoshitaka Amano's illustrations. Working in the Final Fantasy and Final Fantasy IX designs brought no difficulties since in for the former game, Nomura based his designs on Amano's illustrations while he had already been involved in handling his illustrations in the latter. On the other hand, Nomura had difficulties making Onion Knight as it ended being too cartoony and requested advice from Amano. Nomura's own original illustrations were also redesigned for Dissidia; Nomura commented to the Japanese gaming magazine Famitsu that Tidus was designed to look younger than he was in Final Fantasy X to "match the design touch of the rest of the Dissidia" cast.

Square Enix filed for United States trademark registration of "Dissidia" in April 2007; the mark's relation to Final Fantasy was omitted. The title was connected with Final Fantasy when Square Enix introduced Dissidia Final Fantasy on May 8 with an official Japanese website.

=== Music ===
The Dissidia Final Fantasy Original Soundtrack by Takeharu Ishimoto was released on December 24, 2008, and is available in both regular and special editions, similar to the game itself. Most tracks are often remixes done by Ishimoto of past Final Fantasy music originally composed by Nobuo Uematsu.

The main theme of the game is "The Messenger" by Your Favorite Enemies. The tracks "Cosmos" and "Chaos - Last Battle 1" are also performed by Your Favorite Enemies. "The Messenger" is the main theme song of the game, with lyrics from both "Cosmos" and "Chaos - Last Battle 1". "Cosmos" features female vocals, while "Chaos" is dominated by male vocals. In YFE's documentary on the conception of the songs for Dissidia, lyricist-vocalist Alex Foster admitted that the lyrics have no direct connection to themes of the game; rather, he left it up to the listeners to interpret the lyrics based on their thoughts and ideas.

Track list

Disc 1
No.	Title	Japanese title	Length
1.	"Dissidia" (opening from Dissidia Final Fantasy)		5:34
2.	"Prelude" (menu from Dissidia Final Fantasy)	「プレリュード」	3:00
3.	"Dissidia" (menu from Dissidia Final Fantasy)		1:24
4.	"Keeping the Peace" (from Dissidia Final Fantasy)	「守るべき秩序」	2:26
5.	"Cosmos" (from Dissidia Final Fantasy)		6:09
6.	"Victory Fanfare" (Cosmos from Dissidia Final Fantasy)	「勝利ファンファーレ」	1:13
7.	"Main Theme" (arrange from Final Fantasy I)	「メインテーマ」	1:29
8.	"Battle" (arrange from Final Fantasy I)	「戦闘シーン」	3:33
9.	"Dungeon" (arrange from Final Fantasy I)	「ダンジョン」	2:27
10.	"Main Theme" (arrange from Final Fantasy II)	「メインテーマ」	1:56
11.	"Battle Theme 1" (arrange from Final Fantasy II)	「戦闘シーン1」	3:44
12.	"Battle Theme 2" (arrange from Final Fantasy II)	「戦闘シーン2」	2:53
13.	"Warriors of Light" (from Dissidia Final Fantasy)	「光の戦士達」	0:35
14.	"Eternal Wind" (arrange from Final Fantasy III)	「悠久の風」	2:23
15.	"Battle 2" (arrange from Final Fantasy III)	「バトル2」	3:02
16.	"This Is the Last Battle" (arrange from Final Fantasy III)	「最後の死闘」	1:59
17.	"Battle Preparations" (from Dissidia Final Fantasy)	「臨戦」	1:48
18.	"Main Theme of Final Fantasy IV" (arrange from Final Fantasy IV)	「ファイナルファンタジーIV メインテーマ」	2:40
19.	"Battle with the Four Fiends" (arrange from Final Fantasy IV)	「ゴルベーザ四天王とのバトル」	3:12
20.	"Battle 2" (arrange from Final Fantasy IV)	「バトル2」	2:26
21.	"Victory Fanfare" (Chaos from Dissidia Final Fantasy)	「勝利ファンファーレ」	1:20
22.	"Four Hearts" (arrange from Final Fantasy V)	「4つの心」	1:50
23.	"Battle at the Big Bridge" (arrange from Final Fantasy V)	「ビッグブリッヂの死闘」	2:29
24.	"Battle 1" (arrange from Final Fantasy V)	「バトル1」	1:15
25.	"At Presentiment's Edge" (from Dissidia Final Fantasy)	「思惑の果て」	3:12
26.	"Terra's Theme" (arrange from Final Fantasy VI)	「ティナのテーマ」	1:06
27.	"The Decisive Battle" (arrange from Final Fantasy VI)	「決戦」	1:57
28.	"Battle to the Death" (arrange from Final Fantasy VI)	「死闘」	2:29
29.	"The Quickening" (from Dissidia Final Fantasy)	「胎動」	1:59
30.	"The Troops' Advance" (from Dissidia Final Fantasy)	「進軍」	2:34

Disc 2
No.	Title	Japanese title	Length
1.	"Main Theme of Final Fantasy VII" (arrange from Final Fantasy VII)	「F.F.VII メインテーマ」	2:21
2.	"One-Winged Angel" (orchestra version from Final Fantasy VII)	「片翼の天使」	4:26
3.	"Fight On!" (arrange from Final Fantasy VII)	「更に闘う者達」	3:07
4.	"A Brief Respite" (from Dissidia Final Fantasy)	「一時の安息」	0:54
5.	"Blue Fields" (arrange from Final Fantasy VIII)		2:15
6.	"Don't Be Afraid" (arrange from Final Fantasy VIII)		2:55
7.	"The Extreme" (original from Final Fantasy VIII)		4:19
8.	"Defeat" (Fanfare from "Dissidia Final Fantasy")	「敗北ファンファーレ」	0:51
9.	"Over the Hill" (arrange from Final Fantasy IX)	「あの丘を越えて」	2:37
10.	"Battle 1" (arrange from Final Fantasy IX)		3:15
11.	"Battle 2" (original from Final Fantasy IX)		3:58
12.	"Mambo de Chocobo" (original from Final Fantasy V)	「マンボ de チョコボ」	1:11
13.	"Movement in Green" (arrange from Final Fantasy X)	「萌動」	2:10
14.	"Otherworld" (original from Final Fantasy X)		3:14
15.	"Battle Theme" (original from Final Fantasy X)	「ノーマルバトル」	3:11
16.	"Victory Fanfare" (original from Final Fantasy V)	「勝利のファンファーレ」	0:44
17.	"The Federation of Windurst" (original from Final Fantasy XI)		2:54
18.	"Battle in the Dungeon #2" (original from Final Fantasy XI)		1:32
19.	"Theme of the Empire" (original from Final Fantasy XII)	「帝国のテーマ」	3:56
20.	"Boss Battle" (original from Final Fantasy XII)		3:25
21.	"Answer" (from Dissidia Final Fantasy)		1:53
22.	"Chaos" (Last Battle 1 from Dissidia Final Fantasy)		5:41
23.	"Final Fantasy" (from Dissidia Final Fantasy)		2:13
24.	"Dissidia" (ending from Dissidia Final Fantasy)		8:41
25.	"The Messenger" (bonus track)		4:13

== Release and merchandise ==
For the western localization of Dissidia Final Fantasy, the Square Enix staff used analysis from their subsidiary companies in London and Los Angeles to readjust the game for Western audiences. The release date for the western world was revealed to be August 25, 2009 (starting in North America); this version was enhanced with a number of small changes, including re-adjustments in gameplay, new gameplay events, an arcade gameplay mode, a shortened tutorial, new moves for playable characters, and extra cutscenes featuring cameos from several other characters from the main characters' original games that do not appear in the Japanese version. Director Takeshi Arakawa referred to the Western version as a more action-based game than the original Japanese version, which was more RPG-based.

For the United States release, GameStop released the game with two additional covers as a pre-order bonus for players who reserved it before it came out. An international version of the game, named Dissidia Final Fantasy: Universal Tuning, (Note: ディシディア ファイナルファンタジー ユニバーサルチューニング) is a direct port of the North American version of the game, retaining all the extra features added, and was released in Japan on November 1, 2009. Both English and Japanese voices are available in battle, with the player deciding which language the characters will speak.

A Dissidia Final Fantasy-themed PSP bundle, which included a "Mystic Silver" PSP system, a copy of Dissidia Final Fantasy, a 2GB memory stick, and a copy of the Final Fantasy VII: Advent Children film was released on August 25, 2009.

Studio BentStuff published the Dissidia Final Fantasy Ultimania α as the initial reference guide for the game. Released on December 4, 2008, this book became part of the Ultimania series, which includes the Kingdom Hearts Ultimania α. Suntory Ltd. also collaborated with Square Enix to create the "Dissidia Final Fantasy Potion" drinks which were released on December 9 in Japan to promote the game's release.

Square Enix released a line of Trading Arts figures in early 2009 with Series 1 containing Cloud Strife, Squall Leonhart, Zidane Tribal, Tidus, and the Warrior of Light. A second series was later released featuring Sephiroth, Terra, Bartz, Firion, and Cecil.

== Reception ==
Reception

Aggregate score
Aggregator	Score
Metacritic	79/100

Review scores
Publication	Score
1Up.com	A−
Eurogamer	8/10
Famitsu	36 of 40
Game Informer	6.5/10 (Second Opinion: 6.5)
GameSpot	8.5/10
GamesTM	8/10
GameTrailers	8.7/10
IGN	8.9/10
X-Play	4/5

=== Sales ===
Dissidia sold well according to Takeshi Arakawa, despite concerns about piracy. As of August 2009, Dissidia Final Fantasy has sold 910,000 copies in Japan, making it the fourth best-selling game for the PSP in Japan. It was the 12th best-selling game in Japan in 2008, selling 660,262 copies. In the United States, Dissidia debuted as the 7th top-selling software of the August 2009 charts with 130,000 copies, despite only four days of availability. Figures from the NPD Group list Dissidia Final Fantasy as the best-selling PSP game of 2009.

=== Reviews ===
Dissidia was well received by the Japanese gaming magazine Famitsu with individual scores of 9/9/10/8, earning the game a place in its "Best Picks of This Week" feature as well as its "Platinum Hall of Fame". The game's battle system was described as fast-paced and exhilarating, with simple controls capable of producing battles like those found in Final Fantasy VII: Advent Children, though it was noted that the action can become difficult to follow when things got hectic and that some of the more technical aspects of the game can be hard to grasp. The game was also praised for its story and cutscenes, with one reviewer noting that the history was "exacting".

The game also enjoyed positive reviews by American critics. 1UP.com and GameSpot praised the fighting system and visuals, with the latter commenting on the mix of RPG and action gameplay. The story received mixed reactions, as GameSpot said that it would only interest fans of the franchise, while 1UP.com enjoyed its references to previous games. RandomNPC called the game "one of the few must-have games for the PSP". Game Informer was critical, claiming that the story and gameplay were too similar to past Final Fantasy titles and would turn off new players.

In the Best of E3 2009, Dissidia was awarded "Best Fighting Game" by IGN. Dissidia also received awards from Famitsu and in the Japan Game Awards 2008. In 2010, the game was included as one of the titles in the book 1001 Video Games You Must Play Before You Die.

=== Legacy ===
Following the game's positive reception by gamers in Japan that surpassed Nomura's expectations, he already had in mind several new ideas for a sequel and wished to feature Kain in it. Yoshinori Kitase stated that the fight between Cloud and Sephiroth from the film Advent Children was popular enough to make Japanese gamers do a remake of it for the crossover Dissidia Final Fantasy and expected Western fans to also emulate it.

A follow up to Dissidia titled Dissidia 012 Final Fantasy was released in March 2011 for the PlayStation Portable. Since Dissidia had a concrete ending, the team decided to make the story as a prequel. Tetsuya Nomura said that there would be no more Dissidia games following Dissidia 012 although the series may continue "in another form" since the team already believed they did enough with the fighting genre. The main story of Dissidia also served as a basis for the 2012 rhythm game Theatrhythm Final Fantasy for the Nintendo 3DS, which also uses multiple characters from the Final Fantasy series. In 2013, Ichiro Hazama said that he and much of the team intended to make a third Dissidia title, but did not mention possible platforms. Two years later, a new title, Dissidia Final Fantasy NT, was released for arcades in Japan, and later for PlayStation 4 and Windows. Unlike the previous Dissidia titles, this game features 3v3 combat, as well as adding new playable characters such as Y'shtola and Ramza Beoulve. A freemium mobile spin-off titled Dissidia Final Fantasy Opera Omnia was released in February 2017 for Japan, and January 2018 for international territories respectively. Another mobile title, Dissidia Duellum Final Fantasy, was released in March 2026.

Stranger of Paradise: Final Fantasy Origin, an alternate universe prequel to the first Final Fantasy, makes several allusions to the Dissidia franchise especially during its final DLC episode Different Future. For instance, manikins, the common enemies featured in Dissidia's story mode, are featured as a game and plot element in the DLC episode.
