= Final Fantasy Trading Card Game =

Collectible card game

- Card back to the Final Fantasy CCG
- Designers: Tarou Kageyama
- Publishers: Square Enix
- Players: 2 or more
- Setup time: < 5 minutes
- Playing time: < 60 minutes

The Final Fantasy Trading Card Game (Japanese: ファイナルファンタジー・トレーディングカードゲーム Fainaru Fantajī Torēdingu Kādo Gēmu), often abbreviated as Final Fantasy TCG or FF-TCG, is a trading card game developed by Hobby Japan and published by Square Enix. The first iteration (the "Chapter" series) was released in Japan in 2011 but never released outside Japan and was discontinued in order to release a second iteration (the "Opus" series) worldwide in October 2016.

Each player uses a deck of 50 cards, with no more than 3 copies of the same card. Players play cards by spending Crystal Points, earned by "dulling" (turning from vertical to horizontal) Backup cards, or by discarding cards. The game features a wide range of Characters from games in the Final Fantasy series. The game has a global tournament circuit.

There are 1898 unique cards in the Chapter series. As of Opus XI, the Opus series developed 1700 different cards. The game had sold more than 3.5 million booster packs in Japan (as of September 2016) and 5.5 million packs worldwide (as of July 2017).

== Gameplay ==
=== Setup ===
Players build a deck of exactly 50 cards with no more than 3 copies of the same card. At the start of the game, each player shuffles their deck and places it in their deck zone. Each player then draws 5 cards. A player may mulligan once by placing the 5 original cards on the bottom of their deck in any order then drawing 5 new cards. A random method is used to determine who chooses the starting player. The player who goes first draws one card on the first turn, but every turn after that first turn, each player draws 2 cards.

=== How to play ===
Players play other cards by spending Crystal Points (CP). Crystal Points are gained by Dulling (turning a card sideways) a Backup card, which will provide one Crystal Point of its Element type, or by discarding a card from the player's hand, which will provide two Crystal Points of its Element type. To successfully play a card, the player must pay the CP cost with at least 1 CP belonging to its Element type. Example: A Fire card with a cost of 5 CP requires one Fire CP and four CP of any type. Light and Dark Element type cards do not have this restriction and any CP can be used to play these cards, but they cannot be discarded for CP. Cards in play can either be active (vertical) or dull (horizontal) and often switch between the two, including at the start of each turn when all of the turn player's cards become active.

The primary goal of the game is to deal 7 damage to the opposing player. Players play Characters including Forwards which can attack the opponent during the owner's Attack Phase as long as they're active and have been in play since the beginning of the turn. When a Forward attacks, the non-turn player may declare a block with one of their own active Forwards. When Forwards battle, they deal damage to each other equal to their power value. A Forward with equal or more damage than its own power is broken and put into its owner's Break Zone. If an attacking Forward isn't blocked, it deals one damage to the defending player. When a player is dealt damage, they put 1 card per damage from the top of their deck face-up into their Damage Zone. When a Damage Zone has seven cards in it, that player loses the game.

To play a card or ability, a player announces the card or ability and any targets it has and pays the CP cost. Either player can respond to an effect before it resolves using the "stack". If both players consecutively "pass priority" (choose not to add another effect to the stack), the top effect on the stack resolves (the most recent one added) then players may once again add effects to the stack. The process continues until both players consecutively pass while the stack is empty, in which case the next phase of the turn begins. Every turn moves through 6 phases sequentially; the Active Phase, Draw Phase, Main Phase 1, Attack Phase, Main Phase 2 and End Phase. Character cards (Forwards, Backups and Monsters) can only be played by the turn player during their own Main Phase 1 or 2 while the stack is empty. Summons and Action/Special Abilities of Characters can be added to the stack any time the owner has priority. During the End Phase, if the turn player has more than 5 cards in their hand, they must discard cards until they have 5.

=== How to win ===
The game ends when a player fulfills a losing condition. Three conditions exist: Have 7 cards in the Damage Zone, attempt to draw from an empty deck, or receive damage while the deck is empty.

== Final Fantasy TCG Game Formats ==
=== Constructed ===
This is the most common format in the Final Fantasy trading card game. In competitive play, this format also adheres to a ban list of certain cards, as well as card errata. Constructed also has a variant format.

==== L3 Constructed ====
This is a variation of the Constructed format in Final Fantasy TCG. Created in 2020, this format limits deck construction to the last three released Final Fantasy TCG sets, or "opus".

=== Limited ===
Unlike in Constructed play, a player's deck can contain a minimum of 40 cards and games can be won by dealing the opponent 6 points of damage. Players can also have more than 3 copies of the same card in their deck. However, all other Constructed rules apply. There are two variations of Limited play in Final Fantasy TCG: Sealed and Draft. This format sees competitive play.

==== Sealed ====
In Sealed, players receive 9 Final Fantasy TCG booster packs and construct a deck from them.

==== Draft ====
In Draft, players receive 5 Final Fantasy TCG booster packs. Each player then picks one card from their provided booster pack and then passes it to the player to their immediate left until no cards are left. Then, the next pack is opened and this pattern continues to the player on the immediate right. This happens until all packs are opened. Once this process ends, each player constructs a deck in accordance to the Limited rules.

=== Title ===
Title format limits deck construction to contain only one Final Fantasy archetype (for example only Final Fantasy 7 cards). The normal gameplay rules are changed, allowing players to play cards using Crystal Points of any color and even have different cards of the same name on the field at the same time.

=== All Stars Draft Cube ===
The All Stars Draft Cube is a pre-constructed collection of select Final Fantasy TCG cards. The exact card list changes over time. Gameplay follows "Limited Draft" rules.

== Card information ==
=== Card name and ID ===
The card name is written in a frame at the top of the card. A player may only have one Character with that name on their side of the field unless the Character has the multi-unit icon in the top right-hand corner. The top right-hand corner might also have an EX icon which means its first ability (for Characters) or the entire effect (for Summons) can trigger when the card is placed into the Damage Zone. The ID of the card is written at the bottom of the card. A deck may contain at most 3 cards with the same ID.

=== Cost ===
The cost of a card is indicated by the number in the top left-hand corner. It indicates how many CP are needed to play the card.

=== Element ===
The element of a card is given by the color of the crystal in the top left-hand corner, by the background color of the card text, and by the element symbol in the background of the text. The eight elements are: fire, ice, wind, earth, lightning, water, light, and dark.

=== Type, job, and category ===
The type of a card is given by a text on the left, as well as the shape of the top and left frames of the card; there are four types of card:

- Forward: played active. A Forward may attack the opponent, or defend from the opponent's attacks. They often also have abilities.
- Backup: played dull. An active Backup can be dulled to produce one CP of its element. They often also have abilities.
- Monster: played active. Monsters can't inherently attack or defend but always have abilities. They can sometimes be treated as a Forward due to card effects (including their own in many cases).
- Summon: can be cast during any main phase or attack phase. Summon is the only card type which isn't a Character. Summons go on the stack instead of entering the field and are put into the Break Zone once they've resolved. The job of a Character is written in the center of the card, the category of a card is written on the right; job and category are grouping the cards under archetypes, to which abilities may refer.

=== Text ===
The card text describes different abilities a Character has, or a Summon's effects. There are four types of abilities for Characters:

- Action abilities, which the owner can manually activate by paying the cost.
- Auto-abilities, which automatically activate when a trigger occurs.
- Special abilities, which function like Action Abilities but have a name and include in their cost discarding a Character with the same name as the one using its ability.
- Field abilities, which usually apply a constant effect while the Character is in play (but may also include cost modification or restrictions on how the card can be played).

Some effects have a special term called a "keyword". Keywords are usually Field Abilities although some describe other effects. The most common examples are:

- Haste: This Forward can attack even if it hasn't been in play since its owner's Active Phase. This Forward or Backup can use an Action/Special Ability with the dull icon in its cost even if it hasn't been in play since its owner's Active Phase.
- Brave: This Forward doesn't dull when it attacks.
- First strike: During combat with another Forward, this Forward deals damage to the other Forward first instead of simultaneously. This means if the other Forward is broken due to the damage dealt, it won't deal damage back.
- Back attack: This Character can be played during any Attack Phase or Main Phase, like a Summon.
- Freeze: A state applied by many card effects, usually from the Ice element. If a Forward is Frozen, it won't activate during its owner's next Active Phase.

=== Power ===
Only printed on Forwards and Monsters with an effect that allows them to be treated as a Forward, the power is indicated in the bottom right-hand corner of the card. The power of a card is separate from the damage it takes: a card takes damage when attacking, defending, or due to an effect; while its power can only be raised or lowered by an effect.

== Development ==
=== Chapter series ===
The Chapter series started after Square Enix contacted Tarou Kageyama of Hobby Japan about the creation of a trading card game. The timing was fortunate, according to Kageyama, because Hobby Japan was at that time looking to develop a totally new trading card game. The Chapter series was only released domestically, so the cards are all in Japanese. The initial series lasted from February 2011 until 2015 and released 15 sets in total with 1098 unique cards.

=== Opus series ===
After four years, the game was starting to hit limitations, and the desire to have more players in a game, and to have the series expand to North America and Europe, so the series was remade and relaunched globally as "Opus I". "Opus II" launched in October 2016 with a card set of 148 cards focused on Final Fantasy IV, VIII, XII, and XIV. June 2017 was to focus on Final Fantasy IX; "Fire and Water", and Final Fantasy Type-0: "Lightning and Wind" starter deck sets.

"Opus XIV" and "XV" were released in August and November 2021, respectively.

== Competitive play ==
The Final Fantasy Trading Card Game has had competitive play, starting in 2017. Square Enix officially hosts the following competitive events:

=== Pre-releases ===
Run by local game shops, pre-releases are competitive events where players can construct decks using soon-to-be released cards from the next Opus set. Each pre-release kit has historically contained 2 exclusive items. Pre-releases tournaments are played using the "Limited Sealed" format.

=== Regionals/Nationals ===
Hosted by local game shops, Regional events gives winners a free win during the European National event. For the North American player base, Regionals are called Local Qualifiers (LQ) where winners are guaranteed an invitation to the North American National Tournament.

=== Crystal Cups ===
These events are themed around Final Fantasy elements such as Lightning, Fire and Water. Players that place the highest by the end of the event are given prizes and awards. Winners of these events get a paid-for trip to the Final Fantasy Trading Card Game World Championship.

=== World Championship ===
Players that have won Crystal Cup tournaments are invited to play in the world championship. Previous locations included Tokyo, London, and Los Angeles.

== Design ==
The back surface of the cards have a treatment applied to give a luxury feel when held. The backs of the Chapter cards are based on white with black overlay. Opus cards kept the same surface on the backs, but are based on black with white overlay. "In the Chapter series, the shape of the textbox frames was the same for all cards, making it difficult to distinguish card types", explains Kageyama. The frame in the Opus series is changed for each card type to make telling them apart easy. The background color in the frame has also been changed, so that it can be seen as a forward type if it is black and a backup type if it is white.

== Reception ==
It was first released Japan in 2011 and in English in October 2016.

Final Fantasy TCG has been noted for its quick and streamlined gameplay, but the game has been criticized for having very small card text that is hard to read. The game has been compared to Magic: the Gathering. As of September 2016, the game has sold more than 3.5 million booster packs in Japan and 5.5 million packs worldwide as of July 2017.
