= Final Fantasy V =

1992 video game

- Developer: Square
- Publishers: Square: Super Famicom; JP: Square; PlayStation; JP: Square; NA: Square Electronic Arts; EU: Sony Computer Entertainment; Game Boy Advance; JP: Square Enix; WW: Nintendo; iOS, Android, Windows, PS4, Switch; WW: Square Enix
- Director: Hironobu Sakaguchi
- Designer: Hiroyuki Ito
- Programmer: Ken Narita
- Artists: Yoshitaka Amano (promotional artworks); Kazuko Shibuya (character designs, pixel art)
- Writers: Hironobu Sakaguchi; Yoshinori Kitase
- Composer: Nobuo Uematsu
- Series: Final Fantasy
- Platform: Super Famicom: PlayStation; Game Boy Advance; iOS; Android; Windows; Nintendo Switch; PlayStation 4; Xbox Series X/S
- Release: December 6, 1992: Super Famicom; JP: December 6, 1992; PlayStation; JP: March 19, 1998; NA: October 5, 1999; EU: March 1, 2002; Game Boy Advance; JP: October 12, 2006; NA: November 6, 2006; EU: April 20, 2007; iOS; WW: March 28, 2013; Android; WW: September 25, 2013; Microsoft Windows; NA/EU: September 24, 2015; Pixel Remaster; Android, iOS, Windows; WW: November 10, 2021; Nintendo Switch, PlayStation 4; WW: April 19, 2023 Xbox Series X/S; WW: September 26, 2024
- Genre: Role-playing
- Modes: Single-player, multiplayer

Final Fantasy V (Note: Japanese: ファイナルファンタジーV, Hepburn: Fainaru Fantajī Faibu) is a 1992 role-playing video game developed and published by Square for the Super Famicom. It is the fifth main installment of the Final Fantasy series. The game begins as a wanderer named Bartz investigates a fallen meteor. There, he encounters several characters, one of whom reveals the danger facing the four Crystals that control the world's elements. These Crystals act as a seal on Exdeath, an evil sorcerer. Bartz and his party must keep the Crystals from being exploited by Exdeath's influence and prevent his resurgence.

It has been ported with minor differences to Sony's PlayStation and Nintendo's Game Boy Advance. An original video animation produced in 1994 called Final Fantasy: Legend of the Crystals serves as a sequel to the events depicted in the game. It was released for the PlayStation Network on April 6, 2011, in Japan. An enhanced port of the game, with new high-resolution graphics and a touch-based interface, was released for iPhone and iPad on March 28, 2013, for Android on September 25 the same year and for Windows on September 24, 2015. A more enhanced re-release of the game as part of the Final Fantasy Pixel Remaster series, was released on November 10, 2021 for Android, iOS, and Windows, for Nintendo Switch and PlayStation 4 on April 19, 2023, and for Xbox Series X/S on September 26, 2024.

Final Fantasy V has been praised for the freedom of customization that the player has over the characters, achieved through the greatly expanded Job System. Despite being released only in Japan at the time, the Super Famicom version sold more than two million copies. The PlayStation version has earned "Greatest Hits" status, selling more than 350,000 copies.

== Gameplay ==
A battle with Gilgamesh taken from the PlayStation version, the rerelease port of the original Super Famicom version with the official English translation

Final Fantasy V includes many standard role-playing elements as well as renovated features introduced in earlier Final Fantasy games. Players navigate from a top-down perspective; a traversable overworld connects the various towns, dungeons, and other points of interest. The player can traverse the overworld by foot, Chocobo, hydra-guided ship, wind drake, or airship, depending on the situation. Most towns contain scattered inns for resting, shops for purchasing equipment, and people from whom the player can gain information. The player may also embark on several side quests that become available as the story progresses. Characters grow in strength by gaining experience points from random encounters with monsters on the overworld or in a dungeon. Experience culminates in a "level up", in which character attributes such as hit points and magic power increase. A menu-based management system allows the player to equip, heal, and change each character's selected job outside of battle as well as to save the game's progress.

Final Fantasy V is the second Final Fantasy game to use the Active Time Battle (ATB) system, in which time flows continuously for both the player and enemies during combat. This system was first established in Final Fantasy IV, but in that game, there was no way to visibly anticipate which character's turn would come up next. In Final Fantasy V, the player can see which playable character's turn is next in battle, in the form of a time gauge—or "ATB Bar"—which fills according to a character's speed. When the selected character's turn arrives, the player can execute one of several commands, such as attacking the enemy with an equipped weapon, using a special ability or item, or changing the character's row position. The ATB mechanic with a gauge, as seen in V, would be used in the four following main titles in the series and remains a staple mechanic of the franchise.

=== Job System ===
The main feature of the gameplay of Final Fantasy V is the Job System. Players can freely select jobs (also called "classes") for their characters to master, allowing each character to gain special abilities and potentially master all 22 jobs (26 in the Game Boy Advance version). Each character begins with only the "Freelancer" class; to gain access to new jobs, players must acquire crystal shards. This system is an improved version of the one in Final Fantasy III; several older jobs were either reused or revamped for V, such as the Black Mage and Thief. The game also introduces several classes to the series, including the Blue Mage, Time Mage, and Mime. Each of these classes has been featured in numerous Final Fantasy installments since.

Once the player gains access to the job system, characters begin to earn a separate form of experience—Ability Points—in conjunction with regular experience points. Characters gain job levels after accumulating AP; as with regular levels, the required amount of experience increases after each job level. AP and job levels do not transfer from class to class. As job levels increase, new skills become available for the character to use in a new form of customization; characters learn job-specific abilities that may be transferred to a new job. For example, a character with the Knight job who has also earned job levels as a Black Mage may set Black Magic as a secondary command, enabling both Black Mage and Knight abilities in battle. The nature of these abilities varies; while some serve as special commands in battle, others may be innate to the class or activated automatically when conditions are met, such as the Thief's "Caution" skill, which prevents rear attacks from enemies. This system allows for deeper customization of characters.

== Plot ==
=== Setting ===
The backstory of Final Fantasy V is revealed in phases through cutscenes and interactions with non-playable characters. One millennium before the events of the main story, a powerful mage named Enuo imperiled the world using the power of an evil entity called the "Void". The people retaliated by using twelve legendary weapons to vanquish Enuo, but the Void itself could not be destroyed. Consequently, the people split the world's four elemental Crystals into two sets, effectively creating two worlds. The Void then became sealed in a dimensional cleft between the two worlds.

Nearly a thousand years passed without incident, and both worlds prospered due to the powers of their Crystals of Wind, Water, Fire, and Earth. New kingdoms and towns flourished, and travel by ship acted as a critical means of commerce and communication. However, a sinister force was stirring in the second world—ever since the Void incident, malicious demons had been sealed inside a tree in the Great Forest of Moore. The corrupted amalgamation of spirits emerged as Exdeath, the game's primary antagonist. When Exdeath attempted to claim the world for himself, a group of heroes called the "Four Warriors of Dawn" (Galuf, Xezat, Dorgann, and Kelger) sealed him within the first world using its Crystals, and peace returned for another thirty years.

=== Characters ===
Concept art of the playable characters of Final Fantasy V by Yoshitaka Amano; from left, Bartz, Krile, Lenna, and Faris.

Final Fantasy V features five player characters, though only up to four are playable at any given time:

- Bartz Klauser - A adventurer who travels the world with his Chocobo companion, Boko. Bartz becomes involved in the main conflict when he investigates the site of a meteorite and befriends Lenna and Galuf. His associated element is Wind, and his strongest attribute is his Strength.
- Lenna Charlotte Tycoon - A princess of Tycoon who follows her father to investigate the Wind Shrine's Crystal, she befriends Bartz and Galuf at the meteorite site, and they soon join on her quest. Her associated element is Water, and her strongest attribute is her Spirit.
- Galuf Halm Baldesion - An amnesiac old man whom Bartz and Lenna discover unconscious near the meteorite. He joins the group in order to regain his memory as well as learning of the forces he fought against. His associated element is Earth, and his strongest attribute is his Stamina.
- Faris Scherwiz - A pirate captain who captures Bartz, Lenna, and Galuf when they try to steal her ship. She initially disguises herself as a man, but the party soon discover her secret. Her associated element is Fire, and her attributes are equally strong in all fields.
- Krile Mayer Baldesion - Galuf's granddaughter and princess of Bal, who follows her grandfather to Bartz's world. Like Galuf, her associated element is Earth, and her strongest attribute is her Magic.

During the story, the player characters encounter many non-player characters. The other Warriors of Dawn, Dorgann Klauser (Bartz's father), Kelger Vlondett, and Xezat Matias Surgate, play important roles. Supporting characters also include engineer Cid Previa, his grandson Mid Previa, and turtle sage Ghido. One of Exdeath's henchmen, Gilgamesh, is a recurring mini-boss in the second half of the game. Gilgamesh has appeared in several Final Fantasy titles since. All characters concept art was designed by Yoshitaka Amano.

=== Story ===
King Tycoon departs to investigate the weakening of the Wind Crystal at the Wind Shrine. Bartz witnesses a meteor plunge to the planet's surface. He encounters Lenna, King Tycoon's daughter; Galuf, an amnesiac old man; and Faris, a pirate captain. They make their way to the Wind Shrine pursuing Lenna's father. There the shards of the shattered crystal grant them new powers. An image of King Tycoon appears, saying the crystals have chosen the four adventurers as their protectors.

The party discovers the crystals make their planet habitable and also seal away Exdeath, an evil sorcerer. The party attempts to save the crystals of Water, Fire, and Earth. Each time, they fail but gain new powers from the crystals' shards. Having been freed, Exdeath defeats the party and returns to his homeworld. King Tycoon, who was controlled by Exdeath to destroy the last crystal, sacrifices himself to save the others.

Galuf's granddaughter Krile arrives by a meteorite, restoring Galuf's memory completely. He recalls he originated from the same world as Exdeath, and resolves to pursue him back home with Krile, with Bartz, Lenna and Faris traveling there as well.

On Galuf's world, Exdeath is already wreaking havoc in pursuit of that world's crystals. The party wins a victory against Exdeath's lieutenant Gilgamesh, but are blown to a distant continent when a magical barrier is activated during their escape. They deactivate the barrier with help from Galuf's allies. The party then travels to Moore Forest in an attempt to protect the world's crystals there. Exdeath deceives them into destroying the crystals' guardians and takes the crystals for himself. Krile arrives to help but is herself trapped by the sorcerer's powers. Galuf saves the others from Exdeath at the cost of his own life. His abilities pass to Krile, who joins the party in his place. The party pursues Exdeath to his castle, where they defeat Gilgamesh again and then Exdeath himself. The crystals shatter, reuniting the split worlds.

For a time, it seems Exdeath has been truly destroyed, and the party celebrates in Tycoon. However, a thorn leaps from Krile's palm, manifesting as Exdeath, now resurrected and fully in command of the Void. With it, he removes entire towns and kingdoms from existence, tossing them into an interdimensional rift.

The reunification of worlds has opened the pathways to ancient sites where powerful artifacts are hidden. So armed, the party enters the rift. With help from a reformed Gilgamesh, they find Exdeath at the center of the rift seeking the power of the Void. They fight Exdeath, first in his demonic tree form, and then after he transforms into Neo Exdeath, intent on destroying all reality, including himself. The heroes defeat Exdeath and use the crystal shards' power to seal the Void once more and restore the reunified world and its crystals.

The game's ending varies based on how many party members are still alive at Neo Exdeath's defeat, detailing the events after the world's resurrection. In the end, the remaining group visits Moore Forest and find that the fallen party members have returned to life.

== Development ==
Final Fantasy V was directed by Final Fantasy series creator Hironobu Sakaguchi who, prior to the release of Final Fantasy IX, called it his favorite Final Fantasy game. The image, and title logo designs were created by series illustrator and image designer Yoshitaka Amano, while the character designs and character sprites were designed by Kazuko Shibuya. The monsters were designed by Tetsuya Nomura. Amano has stated that he counts his depictions of both Faris from Final Fantasy V and Terra from VI among his favorite Final Fantasy designs. The writing of the scenario text was a collaborative effort between Sakaguchi and Yoshinori Kitase. Sakaguchi conceived the plot and was in charge of it, while Kitase tried to include more humor to lighten up the relatively serious story. The Job System was designed by Hiroyuki Ito, who worked on the game as a battle planner alongside Akihiko Matsui. Mode 7 effects were used in the airship sequences, which moving in the airship would cause the planet to rotate on its axis. In total, Square employed a team of 45 people to create the game, and 16 Mbits of space were used to accommodate the sprites, animations, and detailed background. According to GamePro in a May 1993 issue, the Japanese authorities had asked Square not to release the game during a school day because schoolchildren would skip class to wait in line for the game.

The official English translation of Final Fantasy V began shortly after the release of the Japanese version. The game was to be titled "Final Fantasy III" in North America, but the project was abandoned. Square then announced that due to its differing tone and much higher difficulty from the rest of the series, they would be releasing it in North America as a standalone game with a yet-to-be-determined title, rather than part of the Final Fantasy series. This plan was quickly aborted. Translator Ted Woolsey explained in a 1994 interview, "[Final Fantasy V is] just not accessible enough to the average gamer". Rumors circulated that a second attempt at localization would be made and that the game would be titled Final Fantasy Extreme, but this attempt was also canceled. A third attempt was made to port the game to Windows-based personal computers for North American release by developer Top Dog Software, but this was canceled. Another attempt to port the game to Windows for North America was "handled by Eidos Interactive" circa 1998, but it is unclear whether this is the same version Top Dog Software was working on or an actual fourth attempt. The continual canceling of the localization angered fans and led to Final Fantasy V becoming one of the first games to receive a complete fan translation.

=== Music ===
The game's soundtrack was composed by Nobuo Uematsu and consists of 56 tracks. A two-disc album was released alongside the game totaling 67 tracks. Uematsu had originally calculated that the game would require more than 100 pieces of music, but he managed to reduce the number to 56. The song "Dear Friends" would become the title piece in the 2004 concert tour Dear Friends -Music from Final Fantasy-, chosen to reflect Uematsu's appreciation for his music's worldwide fan support. The song "Clash on the Big Bridge" would later be arranged by Hitoshi Sakimoto for the Final Fantasy XII Original Soundtrack in 2006.

The album Final Fantasy V: 5+1 was released in 1992 and contained five songs from the original score as well as a previously unreleased Super Famicom version of "Matoya's Cave" from the original 1987 Final Fantasy for the Nintendo Entertainment System. A collection of arranged tracks, Final Fantasy V Dear Friends; a 13-track disc, Piano Collections Final Fantasy V; and a short series of remixes, Final Fantasy V: Mambo de Chocobo, were all released in 1993. Finally, many of the original songs were included on the North American Final Fantasy Anthology Soundtrack, together with the two-game compilation.

== Ports and remakes ==
Final Fantasy V was ported by Tose to the Sony PlayStation and re-released in Japan on March 19, 1998; it was included in the 1999 release of Final Fantasy Collection, alongside IV and VI. The PlayStation version boasted two new full motion video opening and ending sequences and a "memo-save" feature, but the game otherwise remained unchanged. Square released 50,000 limited edition copies of the collection which included a Final Fantasy-themed alarm clock. In the same year, Square released the PlayStation compilation Final Fantasy Anthology in North America, which included Final Fantasy V, as well as the PlayStation version of VI. This would mark the first time the game was published outside Japan, nearly seven years after its initial release. As early as July 1998 there was media coverage of a port to the PC by Square Enix Europe (then Eidos Interactive) that was never officially released. Screenshots of the cancelled Eidos version include English dialogue that appears to be based on the North American localization that would not be released until September 1999. In 2002, Square released this version of the game in Europe and Australia, this time alongside Final Fantasy IV. The English version of the game received changes from its original format — most notably, Faris was given a Cornish "pirate" accent and there was a different interpretation of character names, such as the names "Bartz" as opposed to "Butz" and "Gill" as opposed to "Guido", the official romanizations in Japan. The port was re-released as part of the Final Fantasy 25th Anniversary Ultimate Box Japanese package in December 2012.

Following the release of the PlayStation 2, Sony reported that the new system had compatibility issues with the Final Fantasy V half of Final Fantasy Anthology. The game experienced a bug where if players attempted to save their games, a graphical error would occur. Square then released a statement that only the look of the save screen was corrupted, and saving was still possible; further, if players wished, repeatedly going into and out of the save screen would make a normal screen eventually appear. This incompatibility was fixed for the PAL and Greatest Hits releases of Final Fantasy Anthology.

Final Fantasy V was ported a second time by Tose to the Nintendo Game Boy Advance as Final Fantasy V Advance, which was released on October 12, 2006, in Japan, November 6 in North America, and April 20, 2007, in Europe. Similar to the Game Boy Advance re-releases of its predecessors, this version features updated graphics, though the changes are very subtle. Additional features include four new jobs (Gladiator, Cannoneer, Necromancer, and Oracle), a new dungeon called "The Sealed Temple", and a new optional boss from the backstory of Final Fantasy V, Enuo, which was designed by Tetsuya Nomura, the monster designer of the original game. In addition, the game included a bestiary, a quick save function, music player, and additional equipment in the style of previous Game Boy Advance re-releases. Like the remakes of its predecessors, Final Fantasy V Advance featured a new English translation.

The original version of the game was released on the Virtual Console in Japan in January 2011 for the Wii, in March 2014 for the Wii U and August 2017 for the New 3DS, and the PlayStation version of the game was re-released on the PlayStation Store as a PSOne Classic in Japan and Europe in April 2011 and in North America on November 22.

In early 2010s, Square Enix considered developing a remake of Final Fantasy V for Nintendo DS, but was concerned that the technical issues would prevent it from happening. The Nintendo 3DS was also considered for the remake. An iOS port, which was developed by Matrix Software, was released on March 28, 2013 on the Apple App Store for iOS devices, with an Android release via the Google Play Store on September 26. The game features new high-resolution graphics with sprites designed by Kazuko Shibuya, who did the original game's artwork, new gameplay features such as movement in eight directions and auto-battle, and contains the Sealed Temple and super-boss Enuo from the Game Boy Advance release. In September 2015 the remaster was released on PC via Steam.

Tetsuya Nomura, director of Final Fantasy VII Remake, expressed interest in remaking Final Fantasy V and VI. Kitase, who produced Final Fantasy VII Remake, also expressed a desire to remake Final Fantasy V.

A 2D pixel remaster was released in North America for Steam, iOS, and Android on November 10, 2021. Unlike the previous remake, many of the features added in the GameBoy Advance remake are absent from this version. The Pixel Remaster version was later released for PlayStation 4 and Xbox Series X|S in 2023 and 2024 respectively.

== Sequel ==
In 1994, Square released an original video animation sequel to Final Fantasy V, simply titled Final Fantasy. Produced by animation studio Madhouse, the anime was released in four 30-minute VHS tapes in Japan and was set two hundred years after the game. The story focuses on four warriors, one of them the descendant of Bartz, protecting the Wind Crystal from the villain Deathgyunos, who pursues it to achieve godhood. It was localized by Urban Vision in 1998 and released in two VHS volumes for North America under the title Final Fantasy: Legend of the Crystals.

== Reception ==
Reception

Aggregate scores
Aggregator	Score
GameRankings	SNES: 66% GBA: 82%
Metacritic	GBA: 83/100 iOS: 85/100; PC (Pixel Remaster): 82/100

Review scores
Publication	Score
1Up.com	SNES: B− GBA: A
AllGame	SNES: 4/5
Electronic Gaming Monthly	GBA: 8.8/10
Famitsu	SNES: 8/10, 9/10, 9/10, 8/10; GBA: 34/40
GameSpot	GBA: 8.5/10
IGN	GBA: 8.5/10
Nintendo World Report	GBA: 8.5/10
RPGamer	SNES: 5/10
TouchArcade	iOS: 4/5 iOS (Pixel Remaster): 5/5
GameDaily	GBA: 7/10

Awards
Publication	Award
GameFan Golden Megawards	Best Import Game, Best Music (Import Game)
Famitsu	15th All Time Best Game

=== Sales ===
Within a day of its release in Japan, Final Fantasy V sold about 900,000 cartridges for ¥8.8 billion ($69 million at the time, or $158 million adjusted for inflation), selling about 4.5 times as many copies as what Final Fantasy IV (1991) sold on its first day and close to the 1.3 million sold by Dragon Quest V (1992) on its first day. Final Fantasy V topped the Japanese sales charts in December 1992 and January 1993, selling 2 million copies during its first two months of release. It was Japan's fourth multi-million seller released in 1992 (following Street Fighter II, Super Mario Kart, and Dragon Quest V), and ended the year as the second best-selling game of 1992 in Japan (below Dragon Quest V).

Final Fantasy V went on to sell a total of 2.45 million units for the Super Famicom in Japan. It was also a commercial success overseas in South Korea, where it was the second best-selling game of 1992 (below Street Fighter II). The Japanese Game Boy Advance version has also sold nearly 260,000 copies as of December 2007. Final Fantasy Collection sold over 400,000 copies in 1999, making it the 31st best selling release of that year in Japan. The North American release of Final Fantasy Anthology sold 364,000 copies as of 2004.

=== Critical response ===
The original Super Famicom version received a positive critical reception upon release, with Famitsu's four reviewers scoring it 34 out of 40, and the first GameFan Golden Megawards awarding it for Best Import Game and Best Music (Import Game) of 1992. Regarding later import western reviews, 1UP's staff claimed that, while the game's story was "very weak", the gameplay was "another story", heavily praising the job system and the feature to combine abilities from different job classes, and gave it a score of B−. Allgame's review shared similar sentiments regarding the storyline and job system, adding praise for the addition of hidden events and items for players to search for, giving the game a score of 3.5 out of 5. RPGamer gave it a mixed review, stating that the game improved on the visual presentation, menu system, and overall field navigation of Final Fantasy IV, but the "maddeningly high encounter rate", "average sound selection", and "washed out" color palette hurt the game's presentation, giving it a score of 5/10.

Critics gave generally positive to mixed reviews for the Anthology version of the game. GameSpot praised the job system for being "one of the series' most in-depth and detailed game systems", but criticized the game for having what they then considered "paper-thin characters" and a "clichéd plot", augmented by a "lack of character development during the game's fetch quests". They went further to say that the translation was poor and overshadowed by the two previous fan efforts. IGN called Final Fantasy V's graphics "dated" but cited "incredibly engrossing" job system as the game's highlight and praised its music. Electronic Gaming Monthly repeated the sentiments towards the job system, adding that while the game suffered from long load times periodically, Final Fantasy V was the main reason to buy the collection.

In comparison, reviews of the Game Boy Advance re-release of the game were mostly positive. GameSpot's review regarded the game more favorably than its PlayStation counterpart, calling it "better than ever" and citing the strong localization of the script and extensive special features. They further stated that while the game's characters "seemed unlikable" and that the plot felt "predictable or trite" at first, they felt the game was still more sophisticated than most games at the time and liked how the script showcased the "distinct personalities" of the cast well. They also enjoyed the game's visuals, stating that they "have charm" and "monsters look great", giving the game a score of 8.5. Nintendo Power wrote that "while playing Final Fantasy V is a chore on the PlayStation, it's good fun on the GBA because of the vastly improved translation and new features", further calling it the "definitive" version of one of the series' best titles. IGN gave the game a score of 8.5, calling it a "must-own" for the portable system and describing it further as always an "entertaining and surprisingly deep role-playing game". 1UP.com also regarded the game more favorably and said the port of the game from the Super Famicom to the Game Boy Advance was "rock solid", and added that while the game's story started off at a slow pace, it gradually improved. The review further praised the addition of features and removal of questionable ones that had been added to the Anthology version of the game. GameDaily gave the game a score of 7/10, noting that while enjoyable, the high encounter rate, the necessity to constantly engage in battle to gain abilities through the job system, and other aspects made the game feel repetitive at times. Nintendo World Report called the retranslation "excellent" and commended that it kept the underlying tones of the game intact. They also praised the ability to switch job classes while keeping the abilities of previous classes as "groundbreaking", how the graphic backgrounds were upgraded "nearly to the quality standard of Final Fantasy VI", and the "excellent soundtrack composed by the legendary Nobuo Uematsu"; and gave the game a score of 8.5/10. The gameplay continued to receive the most praise, with GameSpot calling it "the best part" of the game, and lauded the job system customization for "opening up lots of tactical variety"; while Nintendo World Report praised the gameplay as a "classic J-RPG at its finest" and stated that while the "complex job system is the defining aspect of the title", "the game doesn't slouch when it comes to battling, traveling, or story".

The Pixel Remaster version of the game continued to receive positive reviews. Siliconera stated that the translation for the Pixel Remaster version being mostly unchanged from the Advance version allowed the experience offered by it to be preserved, with CGMagazine additionally lauding it as "the best translation to date". RPGFan considered the Pixel Remaster as "the best the game has ever looked". Siliconera praised the updated visuals and more detailed backgrounds. They also gave praise to the addition of re-orchestrated version of the soundtrack, but noted that "some tracks didn't have that same kind of punchiness as the original songs" and that "some of the re-orchestrated music could be very hit-or-miss for those fond of the original release". They likewise called the reimagined pixel artwork "hit-or-miss for die-hard fans". CGMagazine considered that the game's soundtrack "has always been one of the most diverse and well-rounded in the series". RPGFan lauded the job system as "terrific" with "the ability to equip one skill from a different job as a sub-action, opening up an impressive amount of customization" and the gameplay as "superbly flexible", while CGMagazine commended the introduced quality-of-life features, noting that together with the job system made the game "highly replayable". Nintendo World Report called the Pixel Remaster a "fantastic version of an incredible game", highlighting its "useful boost options" coupled with the "still excellent job system". CGMagazine called Final Fantasy V "a criminally underrated Final Fantasy game", and considered that "the Pixel Remaster is a great version of it", remarking how "formative" it was, having evolved and melded the Job system of I and III with the heavier storytelling of II and IV; and noted that its expanded gameplay, presentation, and expressive animations all paved the way for future entries, ending by stating that "V walked so VI, VII, could run".

While not considered as deep as some later entries of the Final Fantasy series, the characters and story of Final Fantasy V received positive responses in later re-releases. Reviewing Final Fantasy V Advance, Nintendo World Report commended its "good deal of character development" and "plot twists" and went on to say that it sports "a superior story, and a diversity found in few games even today", while GameSpot liked the "distinct personalities" of the cast and how the story still delivers "emotional moments". In reviews for Final Fantasy V Pixel Remaster, RPGFan noted that, due to its comparatively more lighthearted tone compared to IV and VI, V often was dismissed "as little more than a curiosity" and deemed that "a shame, because Final Fantasy V is an absolutely delightful adventure, and a quintessential RPG text that genre fans should not pass up" and commended its "excellent" writing, balance of comedy and drama, "likeable" cast of characters, and the way the story and script feel like an homage to the series. CGMagazine echoed the praise, applauding the game's ability to move from lighthearted into heavier emotional territory, including calamity and personal issues. Siliconera praised the emotional interactions between Lenna, Faris, and their pet companions and between Galuf, Krile, and the party; commending how they still work well despite the game's age and ending by remarking that its cast of characters remains "appealing".

== See also ==
- List of Square Enix video game franchises
