= Naomi Kusumi =

Japanese voice actor

- 楠見 尚己
- Born: June 17, 1954 (age 72); Fukuoka Prefecture, Japan
- Occupations: Actor; voice actor
- Years active: 1978–present
- Agent: Mausu Promotion
- Children: Aiko Kusumi (楠見藍子)

Naomi Kusumi (楠見 尚己, Kusumi Naomi; born June 17, 1954) is a Japanese voice actor. He worked at the Seinenza Theater Company in 1999, and currently works at Mausu Promotion. He is often typecast in either overweight or middle-aged roles in voice acting. In addition, Kusumi inherited the Japanese dubbing of Scooby-Doo from Kazuo Kumakura, who died of rectal cancer in 2015. The first appearance of a successor The Great Adventure of Scooby.

== Voice roles ==
=== Anime series ===
- Baki the Grappler (Mitsunara Tokugawa)
- Bleach: Thousand-Year Blood War (Ichibe Hyōsube)
- Boruto: Naruto Next Generations (Shojoji)
- Coyote Ragtime Show (Bank owner)
- Demashita! Powerpuff Girls Z (Camera Monster, Himeko's father)
- Doraemon (Donpa)
- Dragon Ball Daima (King Kadan)
- Dungeon People (Rangado)
- Fate/zero (Fionn mac Cumhaill)
- Futari wa Pretty Cure Splash Star (Daisuke Hyūga)
- Gallery Fake (Louis Basso)
- Gate: Jieitai Kano Chi nite, Kaku Tatakaeri (Chinese President Dong Dechou)
- Gegege no Kitaro (fifth series) (Yagyō-san)
- Ghost Stories (High school principal)
- Inuyasha (Tsubaki's master)
- JoJo's Bizarre Adventure (Jack the Ripper)
- JoJo's Bizarre Adventure: Diamond Is Unbreakable (Mansaku Nijimura)
- Kenichi: The Mightiest Disciple (Thor)
- Kingdom (Renpa)
- Konohana Kitan (Mouse Master (ep. 1, 11))
- Legend of the Galactic Heroes: Die Neue These (Erlache)
- One Piece (Jerry, Machvise, Emet)
- Overlord II (Shasryu Shasha)
- The Saga of Tanya the Evil (Heinrich Schreise)
- SD Gundam World Heroes (Benjamin V2 Gundam)
- The Ghost in the Shell (Volgarena Representative (ep. 1))
- Tide-Line Blue (King)
- Trouble Chocolate (Macaroni)
- Uninhabited Planet Survive! (Bell's father)
- Natsume's Book of Friends Six (Senki (ep. 6))
- Rokuhōdō Yotsuiro Biyori (Fumihiko Sakurada (ep. 7))
- Shikimori's Not Just a Cutie (Akisada Izumi)

=== Original net animation ===
- JoJo's Bizarre Adventure: Stone Ocean (Chocolate Shop Owner)
- Kengan Ashura (Yōhei Bandō)

=== Film ===
- Mononoke the Movie: The Ashes of Rage (Katsunuma)

=== Tokusatsu ===
- Kyukyu Sentai GoGo Five (Gluttonous Psyma Beast Juuki (ep. 13))
- Tokusou Sentai Dekaranger (Toatlien Bunder (ep. 32 - 33、36))
- Engine Sentai Go-onger (Water Pollution Machine Knight Uzumaquixote (ep. 25))
- Samurai Sentai Shinkenger (Ayakashi Oborojime (ep. 46))

=== Video games ===
- AI: The Somnium Files (So Sejima)
- Bayonetta 3 (Phantasmaraneae)
- Blaze Union: Story to Reach the Future (Alanjame, Norn)
- Blue Dragon (Jiro's father)
- Detroit Become Human (Zlatko)
- Devil May Cry 5 (King Cerberus)
- Dissidia Final Fantasy NT (ExDeath)
- Fire Emblem
  - Fire Emblem Heroes (Walhart)
  - Fire Emblem Awakening (Walhart)
  - Fire Emblem: Three Houses (Nemesis)
- Fist of the North Star: Lost Paradise (Uighur)
- Galaxy Angel series (Lezom Mer Zom)
- God of War (Poseidon)
- God of War II (Prometheus, Atlas)
- Halo 2 (Chieftain Tartarus)
- Lego Dimensions (Scooby-Doo)
- Mana Khemia: Alchemists of Al-Revis (Bernhard Tieck)
- Mighty No. 9 (Battalion)
- Overwatch (Roadhog)
- Ratchet: Deadlocked (Gleeman Vox)
- Rogue Galaxy (Alekt Rosencaster, Lord Logan)
- Skylanders: Spyro's Adventure (Stump Smash)
- Skylanders: Giants (Stump Smash, Tree Rex)
- Sly Cooper (Clockwerk)
- Soulcalibur Legends (Geki)
- Star Ocean: The Last Hope (Stephen D. Kenny)
- Street Fighter
  - Street Fighter IV (Dudley)
  - Street Fighter X Tekken (Dudley)
- Tales of Rebirth (Frantz)
- Tales of the Abyss (Duke Fabre)
- The Witcher 3: Wild Hunt (Baron)
- To Heart 2 (Daniel)
- Yakuza
  - Yakuza (Futoshi Shimano, Tobe)
  - Yakuza 2 (Futoshi Shimano, Tobe)
  - Yakuza 5 (Youtarou Nakajima)
  - Yakuza Kiwami (Futoshi Shimano)
  - Yakuza 0 (Futoshi Shimano)
  - Like a Dragon: Infinite Wealth (Youtarou Nakajima)

=== Dubbing roles ===
==== Live-action ====
- John Goodman
  - Trouble with the Curve (Pete Klein)
  - Flight (Harling Mays)
  - The Internship (Sammy Boscoe)
  - The Monuments Men (Sgt. Walter Garfield)
  - Transformers: Age of Extinction (Hound)
  - The Gambler (Frank)
  - Patriots Day (Ed Davis)
  - Transformers: The Last Knight (Hound)
  - Atomic Blonde (Emmett Kurzfeld)
  - Valerian and the City of a Thousand Planets (Igon Siruss)
- Dave Bautista
  - Guardians of the Galaxy (Drax the Destroyer)
  - Guardians of the Galaxy Vol. 2 (Drax the Destroyer)
  - Bushwick (Stupe)
  - Avengers: Infinity War (Drax the Destroyer)
  - Avengers: Endgame (Drax the Destroyer)
  - Thor: Love and Thunder (Drax the Destroyer)
  - The Guardians of the Galaxy Holiday Special (Drax the Destroyer)
  - Guardians of the Galaxy Vol. 3 (Drax the Destroyer)
- 13 (Ronald Lynn Bagges (Ray Winstone))
- 27 Dresses (Hal Nichols (Brian Kerwin))
- Absolutely Anything (Chief Alien (John Cleese))
- The Amateur (CIA Deputy Director Moore (Holt McCallany))
- The Amazing Spider-Man 2 (Aleksei Sytsevich (Paul Giamatti))
- The Art of War II: Betrayal (Sallas)
- Audrey (Andrew Wald)
- Avatar: The Way of Water (Captain Mick Scoresby (Brendan Cowell))
- Back to the Future Part III (2018 BS Japan edition) (Levi (Dub Taylor))
- Batman Begins (2008 Fuji TV edition) (Carmine Falcone (Tom Wilkinson))
- Black Nativity (Reverend Cornell Cobbs (Forest Whitaker))
- Candyman: Day of the Dead (L.V. Sacco (Robert O'Reilly))
- Cellular (2007 TV Asahi edition) (Mad Dog)
- Civil War (Sammy (Stephen McKinley Henderson))
- The Count of Monte Cristo (Jacopo (Luis Guzmán))
- The Dark Knight (2012 TV Asahi edition) (Michael Wuertz (Ron Dean))
- Dark Shadows (Joshua Collins (Ivan Kaye))
- Dr. Strangelove (Colonel "Bat" Guano (Keenan Wynn))
- Draft Day (Anthony Molina (Frank Langella))
- Eagle Eye (George Callister (Michael Chiklis))
- Elizabethtown (Bill Banyon (Bruce McGill))
- Everwood (Irv Harper (John Beasley))
- The Experiment (Michael Barris (Forest Whitaker))
- Fences (Jim Bono (Stephen McKinley Henderson))
- First Reformed (Pastor Joel Jeffers (Cedric Kyles))
- The Fourth Kind (Awolowa Odusami (Hakeem Kae-Kazim))
- Frank Herbert's Dune (Duke Leto Atreides (William Hurt))
- Frank of Ireland (Frank (Brendan Gleeson))
- The Fresh Prince of Bel-Air (Philip Banks (James Avery))
- Get Smart (Larabee (David Koechner))
- Get Smart (2011 TV Asahi edition) (Secret Service Agent Driver (Matthew Glave))
- Godzilla (Stan Walsh (Garry Chalk))
- Grace of Monaco (Father Francis Tucker (Frank Langella))
- Gun Shy (Fulvio Nesstra (Oliver Platt))
- Harper's Island (Sheriff Charlie Mills (Jim Beaver))
- Harry Potter series (Uncle Vernon Dursley (Richard Griffiths))
- Hart's War (Staff Sergeant Vic W. Bedford (Cole Hauser))
- High School Musical 3: Senior Year (Coach Kellogg)
- I, Robot (Lieutenant John Bergin (Chi McBride))
- Imagine That (Johnny Whitefeather (Thomas Haden Church))
- The Island (Starkweather Two Delta/Jamil "The Juggernaut" Starkweather (Michael Clarke Duncan))
- John Carter (Tardos Mors (Ciarán Hinds))
- The Judge (Glen Palmer (Vincent D'Onofrio))
- Jurassic Park III (Enrique Cardoso (Julio Oscar Mechoso))
- Kingdom of the Planet of the Apes (Raka (Peter Macon))
- The Living Daylights (2006 DVD edition) (Brad Whitaker (Joe Don Baker))
- The Magnificent Seven (Jack Horne (Vincent D'Onofrio))
- Mission: Impossible 2 (2006 TV Asahi edition) (John C. McCloy (Brendan Gleeson))
- Mulan (Sergeant Qiang (Ron Yuan))
- The Number 23 (Doctor Sirius Leary (Bud Cort))
- Once Upon a Time in Mexico (Jorge Ramirez (Rubén Blades))
- Only the Brave (Duane Steinbrink (Jeff Bridges))
- Oz (Lenny, Burrano, Seamus O'Reily (Kevin Conway))
- Paddington 2 (Knuckles McGinty (Brendan Gleeson))
- Pecker (Mister Nellbox)
- Pinocchio (Stromboli (Giuseppe Battiston))
- Piranha 3DD (Deputy Fallon (Ving Rhames))
- Planet of the Apes (Krull (Cary-Hiroyuki Tagawa))
- Platoon (2003 TV Tokyo edition) (King (Keith David))
- Ra.One (Barron (Dalip Tahil))
- Red Dwarf (Captain Herring (Stephen Critchlow))
- Risen (Peter (Stewart Scudamore))
- The Rock (1999 NTV edition) (Seal Reigert (Marshall Teague))
- The Rock (2000 TV Asahi edition) (Captain Darrow (Tony Todd))
- Roman Holiday (PDDVD edition) (Mario Delani (Paolo Carlini))
- The Scorpion King (Jesup (Branscombe Richmond))
- Shark Lake (Sheriff Lewis Galloway (Lance E. Nichols))
- Shinjuku Incident (Uncle Tak (Paul Chun))
- Skylines (Grant (James Cosmo))
- Spy Kids (Felix (Cheech Marin))
- Spy Kids 2: The Island of Lost Dreams (Felix (Cheech Marin))
- Spy Kids 3-D: Game Over (Felix (Cheech Marin))
- The Spy Next Door (Glaze (George Lopez))
- Star Trek: Enterprise (Silik (John Fleck))
- Super 8 (Dr. Thomas Woodward (Glynn Turman))
- Superman (Perry White (Wendell Pierce))
- The Thing About Pam (Narrator (Keith Morrison))
- Third Watch (John 'Sully' Sullivan (Skipp Sudduth))
- True Detective (Major Ken Quesada (Kevin Dunn))
- A View to a Kill (2006 DVD edition) (Sir Godfrey Tibbett (Patrick Macnee))
- The Virgin Suicides (Dr. E. M. Horniker (Danny DeVito))
- We're the Millers (Don Fitzgerald (Nick Offerman))
- Where the Crawdads Sing (James "Jumpin'" Madison (Sterling Macer Jr.))
- Wind River (Martin Hanson (Gil Birmingham))
- Windtalkers (Private Charlie Whitehouse)
- X-Men: Days of Future Past (Richard Nixon (Mark Camacho))
- Y Tu Mamá También (Esteban Morelos)
- Zack Snyder's Justice League (Silas Stone (Joe Morton))

==== Animation ====
- The 7D (Happy)
- Angela Anaconda (Astronaut Bob)
- Barbie as Rapunzel (Hugo the Dragon)
- Barbie as the Princess and the Pauper (Herve and Minister)
- Barbie and the Magic of Pegasus (King)
- The Batman (Cluemaster)
- Batman Beyond: Return of the Joker (Tim Drake)
- Batman: The Brave and the Bold (Scooby-Doo)
- Ben 10 (Doctor Vicktor)
- Bionicle 2: Legends of Metru Nui (Whenua)
- Cars (Peterbilt)
- Cars 3 (Tex)
- The Cat in the Hat (Mr. Hoogeboom)
- Elemental (Bernie Lumen)
- The Emperor's New Groove (Pacha)
- The Emperor's New School (Pacha)
- Fantastic Four (The Thing)
- Finding Nemo (Pearl's Father)
- The Grim Adventures of Billy & Mandy (Scooby-Doo)
- Home (Captain Smek)
- Invincible (Conquest)
- Jackie Chan Adventures (Tohru)
- Johnny Bravo (Scooby-Doo)
- A Kind of Magic (Gregore)
- Kronk's New Groove (Pacha)
- Kung Fu Panda 2 (Panda Dad)
- Monsters, Inc. (trailer) (James P. "Sulley" Sullivan)
- Ned's Newt (Newton)
- Open Season 2 (Boog)
- Open Season 3 (Boog)
- Penguins of Madagascar (Dave / Dr. Octavius Brine)
- Pinky and the Brain (Snowball, Robin Hood, others)
- The Pirates Who Don't Do Anything: A VeggieTales Movie (Robert the Terrible)
- Puss in Boots: The Last Wish (Papa Bear)
- Ralph Breaks the Internet (Butcher Boy)
- Scoob! (Scooby-Doo)
- Scooby-Doo, Where Are You! (Scooby-Doo) (Cartoon Network Japan dub)
- Scooby-Doo and Scrappy-Doo (Scooby-Doo) (Cartoon Network Japan dub)
- Scooby-Doo on Zombie Island (Scooby-Doo)
- Scooby-Doo! and the Witch's Ghost (Scooby-Doo)
- Scooby-Doo and the Alien Invaders (Scooby-Doo)
- Scooby-Doo and the Cyber Chase (Scooby-Doo)
- Shirt Tales (Clarence from "Horsin' Around")
- Teen Titans (Trident)
- The Twisted Tales of Felix the Cat (Mister Cylinder)
- Yogi Bear (Yogi Bear)
- Up (Tom the Construction Worker)

=== Other ===
- Kill Bill: Volume 1 (Boss Matsumoto (voice))
- Kill Bill: The Whole Bloody Affair (Boss Matsumoto (voice))
- Tokyo DisneySea's Raging Spirits (Narrator)
