= Midgar =

Fictional city in Final Fantasy VII

- Final Fantasy location
- A panoramic view of Midgar as seen in 1997's Final Fantasy VII
- First appearance: Final Fantasy VII (1997)
- Created by: Yoshinori Kitase; Yusuke Naora
- Genre: Role-playing video game

In-universe information
- Type: Corpocratic city-state
- Ruled by: Shinra Electric Power Company
- Location: Gaia
- Characters: Cloud Strife; Barret Wallace; Tifa Lockhart; Aerith Gainsborough; Reeve Tuesti; Sephiroth; Zack Fair

Midgar (Japanese: ミッドガル, Hepburn: Middogaru) is a fictional city from the Final Fantasy media franchise. It first appears in the 1997 video game Final Fantasy VII, and is depicted as a bustling metropolis built, occupied, and controlled by the megacorporation Shinra Electric Power Company (神羅電気動力株式会社, Shinra Denki Dōryoku Kabushiki gaisha). The city is powered by electricity drawn from reactors which run on Mako (魔晄, "magic light"), the processed form of spiritual energy extracted by Shinra from the planet on which the Compilation of Final Fantasy VII takes place. Shinra's activities drain the world of its life force, the "Lifestream", threatening the existence of all life as the planet weakens. In spin-offs of the game, the city spanned a town named Edge (エッジ, Ejji).

Midgar is a major aspect of the metaseries' industrial or post-industrial science fiction milieu. It is the centerpiece of Final Fantasy VII Remake and Final Fantasy VII Rebirth, with recurring appearances in related media. Midgar is considered to be one of the most memorable aspects of the original Final Fantasy VII, and it has been well received by critics and the video game community for its cyberpunk aesthetic and dystopian setting. Midgar is featured prominently in discussions about Final Fantasy VII's themes of class conflict and environmentalism.

== Development ==
Final Fantasy VII was originally envisioned to be set in an alternate version of New York City before the development team decided on the fictional city of Midgar. Yusuke Naora, the art director for Final Fantasy VII, designed Midgar among many other locations in the game. Contrary to popular belief that Midgar's steampunk aesthetic is influenced by works such as Blade Runner, Naora said that he had the image of a pizza in mind when he originally designed Midgar and its distinctive plate-like structure. Other in-game elements themed after pizza include Midgar's mayor Domino and the musical theme "Underneath the Rotting Pizza", which plays in various Midgar levels. Like other story elements in Final Fantasy VII, Midgar's name is inspired by Norse mythology.

The 2020 video game Final Fantasy VII Remake focuses on the city of Midgar due to it being a highly recognizable symbol of the world of Final Fantasy VII. The city had to be redesigned from scratch for Remake, as the process of converting the original's 2D backgrounds into a 3D space revealed many "structural contradictions". Beginning with Midgar's original design, the development team created architectural documents outlining how its various aspects should work. With the goal of expanding the city in a way that made sense, the team adjusted Midgar's scale to be more realistic by changing the original city's building size and density, and the game's environments were made larger and denser with consideration for their functionality. Midgar's sights and locales in Remake reference different types of world architecture, and these influences are channeled through the use of materials, light, and space. For example, the city's bus signs heavily resemble their real-world counterparts in New York City. Producer Yoshinori Kitase noted that the developmental team wanted to show a different design aesthetic that presents Midgar with strong elements of colour and variety to accentuate the uniqueness of the game world. The team opted not to use a "photo-realistic approach", but instead one more stylized to honor the artistic design of the original game. Environment director Takako Miyake noted that whenever the team extracted Midgar's design elements from the original, they were "focused on combinations that unconditionally inspired excitement, consistency aside". Retrospectively, the team praised Midgar's eclectic aesthetic from the original game, as they felt it was the most captivating aspect of its setting, and they felt that it was important to ensure each area felt distinct to prevent it from becoming monotonous.

The developers of Remake expanded the roles of previously minor characters in an effort to show more of the lives of Midgar's ordinary citizens and give players a better sense of the city's culture. The original game opens with Cloud's first bombing mission with AVALANCHE with the intention of starting the game in the middle of the action. Instead, Remake precedes the mission with mundane scenes of everyday life for Midgar's citizens, as the developers felt that going straight from the bombing mission into the streets was insufficient in conveying the impact of the destruction of Mako reactors on people's lives. The developers also wanted to add nuance to the bombing mission by making players question AVALANCHE's eco-terrorist activities and emphasizing that innocent people suffer regardless of who is responsible.

Director Tetsuya Nomura acknowledged that concerns were raised regarding the scope of Remake but did not feel that expansion of the Midgar section would be problematic. He explained that while it takes about seven hours to go through Midgar in the original game, the gameplay of Remake is enough to cover an entire game, taking into consideration the travel time in traversing a fully three-dimensional map along with expanded story content. The story and scenario writer for Remake, Kazushige Nojima, said that ending the game where the party departs Midgar would also allow for an adequate amount of planned story scenarios to be incorporated throughout its narrative.

== Background ==
Midgar is located on a world referred to as "the Planet" by the characters, and which is retroactively named "Gaia" in some Square Enix promotional material and by Square Enix staff. Midgar is originally formed from the consolidation of several smaller, independent towns in the distant past; each settlement comprised one sector and gradually lost its original name. The city is ruled by the Shinra Electric Power Company and powered by the company's "Mako" reactors. The city has two principal components: an elevated, circular plate, supported by a central pillar and a system of smaller columns, and a network of slums beneath the plate. The upper plate contains office buildings and similar complexes, as well as theatres, bars and various residences. The plate is divided into eight sectors, with each sector punctuated by two walls and a Mako reactor. The city's prosperity is due to the abundance of Mako energy near it, and the reactor complex causes little to no vegetation to grow within or near it. A commuter railway system carries workers to and from the slums, and security measures are implemented throughout the city. A network of maintenance platforms are suspended beneath the plate. Many citizens live in the slums beneath the sections of the plate. Most buildings there are made of collected scrap shaped into dwellings; most lack architectural planning, with the slums as a whole being littered with wreckage.

At some point in its history, Midgar went to war with the neighboring nation of Wutai. Shinra developed a means of mass-producing and weaponizing "materia", small spheres of crystallized Mako energy that grant their user magical abilities, as well as an army of genetically enhanced, elite military units called "SOLDIER". Shinra ultimately won the war and established Midgar as their seat of power and influence in the wider world by the events of Final Fantasy VII. At one point, Shinra had developed a space exploration program, but following the war with Wutai and the discovery of how profitable processing Mako energy was, Shinra prioritized research on Mako and its applications and consolidated their operations around harvesting Mako energy, effectively cancelling the program.

== Level content ==
In Final Fantasy VII and spin-off media, player characters may visit multiple sectors within Midgar. Noteworthy sectors include:

- The Sector 5 slums, home of Aerith Gainsborough and her adoptive mother, Elmyra Gainsborough. A disused church tended to by Aerith and the area adjacent to Elmyra's house are among the few places with greenery in the city.
- The Sector 6 slums, a dilapidated passageway between Sectors 5 and 7. Wall Market is its largest and most populated area and serves as a red light district. Noteworthy locations include the Honeybee Inn and Don Corneo's mansion.
- The Sector 7 slums, where AVALANCHE is headquartered in a bar called "7th Heaven" run by Tifa Lockhart. Inside the Sector 7 slums is the Train Graveyard, a dark and dangerous area of scrapped trains resembling a maze.
- Sector 0, which contains Shinra's headquarters, a massive building located in the center column of the upper plate which is the tallest structure in Midgar. From their offices, Shinra staff run almost every element of Midgar, from the news media to the reactors that power the metropolis.

== Appearances ==
=== Video games ===
Video games set in Midgar
| 1997 | Final Fantasy VII |
1998
1999
2000
2001
2002
2003
| 2004 | Before Crisis: Final Fantasy VII |
2005
| 2006 | Dirge of Cerberus: Final Fantasy VII |
| 2007 | Crisis Core: Final Fantasy VII |
2008
2009
2010
2011
2012
2013
| 2014 | Final Fantasy VII G-Bike |
2015
2016
2017
2018
2019
| 2020 | Final Fantasy VII Remake |
| 2021 | Final Fantasy VII: The First Soldier |
| 2022 | Crisis Core: Final Fantasy VII Reunion |
| 2023 | Final Fantasy VII: Ever Crisis |
| 2024 | Final Fantasy VII Rebirth |

==== Final Fantasy VII ====
Midgar serves as the setting of the opening section of Final Fantasy VII. The eco-terrorist group AVALANCHE, with assistance from Cloud Strife, engineers successful bombing missions that temporarily put two Mako reactors out of commission. In retaliation, the Turks destroy the pillar holding up the section of the upper plate above Sector 7's slums, causing the plate to collapse and crush the slums below, killing many residents. Shinra executives, hoping that all of AVALANCHE's members would be killed in the incident, blame it on the group to sway public opinion against them.

Following Shinra's capture of Cloud's party during their raid on the company's headquarters, President Shinra reveals his desire to discover the supposed Promised Land, where a "Neo-Midgar" would be built. He claims this land would be so abundant in Mako that it would flow out of the ground without needing Mako reactors to siphon it, which would increase Shinra's profits exponentially.

Some time later, Shinra moves a large Mako-powered cannon from a military installation in Junon to Midgar. It is modified into a superweapon called "the Sister Ray" through its integration with the city's Mako reactor network, with the goal of destroying an energy barrier Sephiroth conjured to protect himself in the Northern Crater after summoning the planet-destroying spell "Meteor". The cannon succeeds, but a simultaneous attack by a rampaging Weapon damages some areas of Midgar and destroys the upper floors of the Shinra headquarters. At the same time, Cloud's party infiltrates the city, defeating several of Shinra's remaining Shinra and disabling the Sister Ray, which is on the verge of destroying the city due to a power overload incited by Professor Hojo, the head of Shinra's Science Department.

The game's ending cutscene reveals that the Meteor nearly destroys Midgar, but it is stopped by the combined effort of a Holy spell summoned by Aerith and the planet's Lifestream. In a post-credits scene set five hundred years later, Midgar is shown to be abandoned and overgrown with greenery.

==== Before Crisis: Final Fantasy VII ====
In the prequel Before Crisis, Midgar experiences an insurgency waged by an earlier iteration of AVALANCHE. The story follows several Turk operatives working with Shinra's armed forces to combat the threat. During the game's events, Midgar is nearly destroyed by the large cannon stationed at Junon, which AVALANCHE had temporarily seized. Eventually, the original incarnation of AVALANCHE was crushed and its name was taken up by a new group that only consisted of a handful of operatives.

==== Dirge of Cerberus: Final Fantasy VII ====
Dirge of Cerberus reveals that while Reeve Tuesti, Yuffie Kisaragi, Vincent Valentine and the Turks managed to evacuate the populace of the upper plate to Midgar's slum sectors prior to the ending of Final Fantasy VII, storms spawned by the intense gravity generated between Meteor and the Planet tore apart several of the city's upper plates. The main antagonistic faction of Dirge of Cerberus is Deepground, a SOLDIER sect developed as an experimental military project by President Shinra prior to his death. Trapped deep underground in Midgar by the effects of the Meteor crisis, Midgar becomes a battlefield during the events of Dirge of Cerberus as the World Restoration Organization (WRO), led by Reeve Tuesti, battles the re-emerged Deepground forces.

==== Final Fantasy VII Remake ====
Final Fantasy VII Remake, the first in a series of games remaking Final Fantasy VII, is set in Midgar. The narrative of Remake covers the beginning of the original game to the escape from Midgar by the surviving members of AVALANCHE and their allies with expanded story content. The setting of Midgar in Remake is noted for its linear nature; while the upper plate regions were mostly inaccessible in the original game, Remake allows players to explore many of these areas and interact extensively with its residents through new story scenarios.

==== Other games ====
Midgar has appeared as a level or stage in various Final Fantasy spin-off titles outside of the Compilation metaseries. These include Final Fantasy VII G-Bike; Dissidia Final Fantasy and its sequels Dissidia 012 and Dissidia NT; Theatrhythm Final Fantasy and its sequel Curtain Call; and Final Fantasy Airborne Brigade.

Outside of the Final Fantasy franchise, Midgar has appeared in the Itadaki Street series, the Super Smash Bros. series, Rampage Land Rankers, and PowerWash Simulator.

=== Other media ===
Final Fantasy VII: Advent Children expands upon the original ending of VII, and reveals that the survivors of Midgar used debris from the city to build a new town called "Edge" on the outskirts of Midgar, though much of the population suffer from a plague known as "Geostigma".

== Cultural impact ==
Julie Muncy from Wired noted that the city of Midgar, along with characters like Cloud Strife and Sephiroth, have achieved a level of cultural impact far beyond the games they originate from and "exist with power outside of their context". Stephen K. Hirst from Ars Technica suggested that a major theme of Final Fantasy VII, which involves an armed struggle between members of the working class and a "hyper-capitalist machine hellbent on extracting every ounce of value from the planet" to benefit Midgar's elite, resonated with a generation of players and inspired some to become environmentalist advocates and activists. The city is the namesake and inspiration behind Midgar Studios, the developer of the role-playing game Edge of Eternity.

Midgar has been a popular subject of fan labor, with some fans attempting to recreate the city's likeness in a real world or fictional context. Midgar city has been digitally recreated by fans within other game worlds like Minecraft and Second Life.

=== Critical reception ===
Harry Mackin from Paste Magazine said the opening act of Final Fantasy VII in Midgar is the game's mostly fondly remembered aspect, and that the city recalls the cyberpunk themes of Akira and Blade Runner. Konstantinos Dimopoulos from WireFrame concurred, noting that Midgar is a "place that managed to define, encapsulate, and summarise a whole setting – a pithy urban symbol of FFVII's world". Jason Faulkner from GameRevolution opined that Midgar is an exemplary JRPG setting which "stands as one of the best examples of world-building in the genre", and the "crowning achievement" of the entire Final Fantasy series. Tom Senior from PC Gamer perceived Midgar's "contradictory identity" to be fascinating in its level of detail, "a breathtaking vision of industrial living gone wrong".

Joe Juba of Game Informer lauded the handling of the city in Remake, specifically the expanded detail of its "political conspiracies, everyday desperation, and quiet hope". Marty Sliva of The Escapist approved of the developers' decision to expand the early hours of Final Fantasy VII into a "30-40 hours" experience, noting that he could experience a "new side of Shinra and Midgar", the latter now with its distinct district and fully realized populations instead of the "single amorphous blob of a city" in the original. EGMNOW praised the themes of ecoterrorism and war and the prominent role Midgar had in the narrative. Nadia Oxford of US Gamer found that the visual upgrade of Midgar in Remake provides an unsettling observation on how Midgar's expansion damages the planet it is located in environmentally, as well as the parallels of "human excess and hubris" between the real world and the game's world.

In regards to the remains of Midgar from Advent Children, Destructoid noted the message within its writing regarding the characters' lives in Midgar, as its people are able to move on with their lives, but Cloud is unable to due to past trauma. They compared this to how the team behind Final Fantasy VII and its fans are still attached to it and unable to move on. Kotaku saw the focus on Midgar's ruins as a parallel with psychological trauma due to how some of its survivors suffer from Geostigma, a disease that cannot be fought physically.
