= Sephiroth (Final Fantasy) =

Final Fantasy character

- Final Fantasy character
- Sephiroth artwork by Tetsuya Nomura for Final Fantasy VII
- First game: Final Fantasy VII (1997)
- Created by: Tetsuya Nomura; Kazushige Nojima
- Designed by: Tetsuya Nomura
- Voiced by: English: Lance Bass (Kingdom Hearts); George Newbern (2006-2018); Tyler Hoechlin (2020-2024); Travis Willingham (Revelation); Japanese: Toshiyuki Morikawa; Shin-ichiro Miki (Ehrgeiz); Yūichirō Umehara (Ever Crisis, teenager)

In-universe information
- Race: Genetically modified Human
- Weapon: Masamune

Sephiroth (Japanese: セフィロス, Hepburn: Sefirosu) is a character and the main antagonist of Square's 1997 role-playing video game Final Fantasy VII. A former soldier of the megacorporation Shinra and the coworker of Zack Fair and superior of Cloud Strife, he possesses superhuman physiology as a result of an experiment in which Shinra injected him with cells from the extraterrestrial lifeform Jenova when he was still a fetus. Upon discovering this, Sephiroth becomes consumed by rage and vengeance, decides to take control of the Planet by harnessing its life force and annihilating all life on it to become a god amidst the destruction. Sephiroth's background and role in the story are expanded upon in the Compilation of Final Fantasy VII. Additionally, he appears as a guest character in other video games and media, such as a recurring boss in the Kingdom Hearts series and as a playable character in Super Smash Bros. Ultimate.

Character designer Tetsuya Nomura conceived and designed Sephiroth as an antagonist and foil to Cloud, as he rejects his identity to fulfill what he believes to be his destiny, while Cloud re-affirms his self-worth amidst a similar crisis of identity. In Japanese, Sephiroth has been voiced by voice actor Toshiyuki Morikawa in the majority of his appearances. He was voiced by Shin-ichiro Miki in Ehrgeiz and Yūichirō Umehara as a young Sephiroth in Ever Crisis. In English, Sephiroth has been voiced by Lance Bass in Kingdom Hearts (2002), and by George Newbern in Kingdom Hearts II (2005) and the Compilation of Final Fantasy VII metaseries (2004–present). In Final Fantasy VII Remake (2020), he was voiced by Tyler Hoechlin, a role he reprises in the remastered Crisis Core: Final Fantasy VII Reunion (2022), replacing Newbern's English performance in the original release, as well as Final Fantasy VII Rebirth (2024). Travis Willingham would take over the role for the trilogy's final installment, Final Fantasy VII Revelation (2027), due to Hoechlin being unavailable to return.

Sephiroth has been well-received within the video game community and is highly ranked on many lists of the best video game villains and Final Fantasy characters based on his role in the narrative and his high challenge level. He was also the subject of analysis as a Final Fantasy villain who lost his humanity upon learning of his alien heritage, and how he attempts to corrupt Cloud by exploiting his mental weaknesses.

== Concept and creation ==
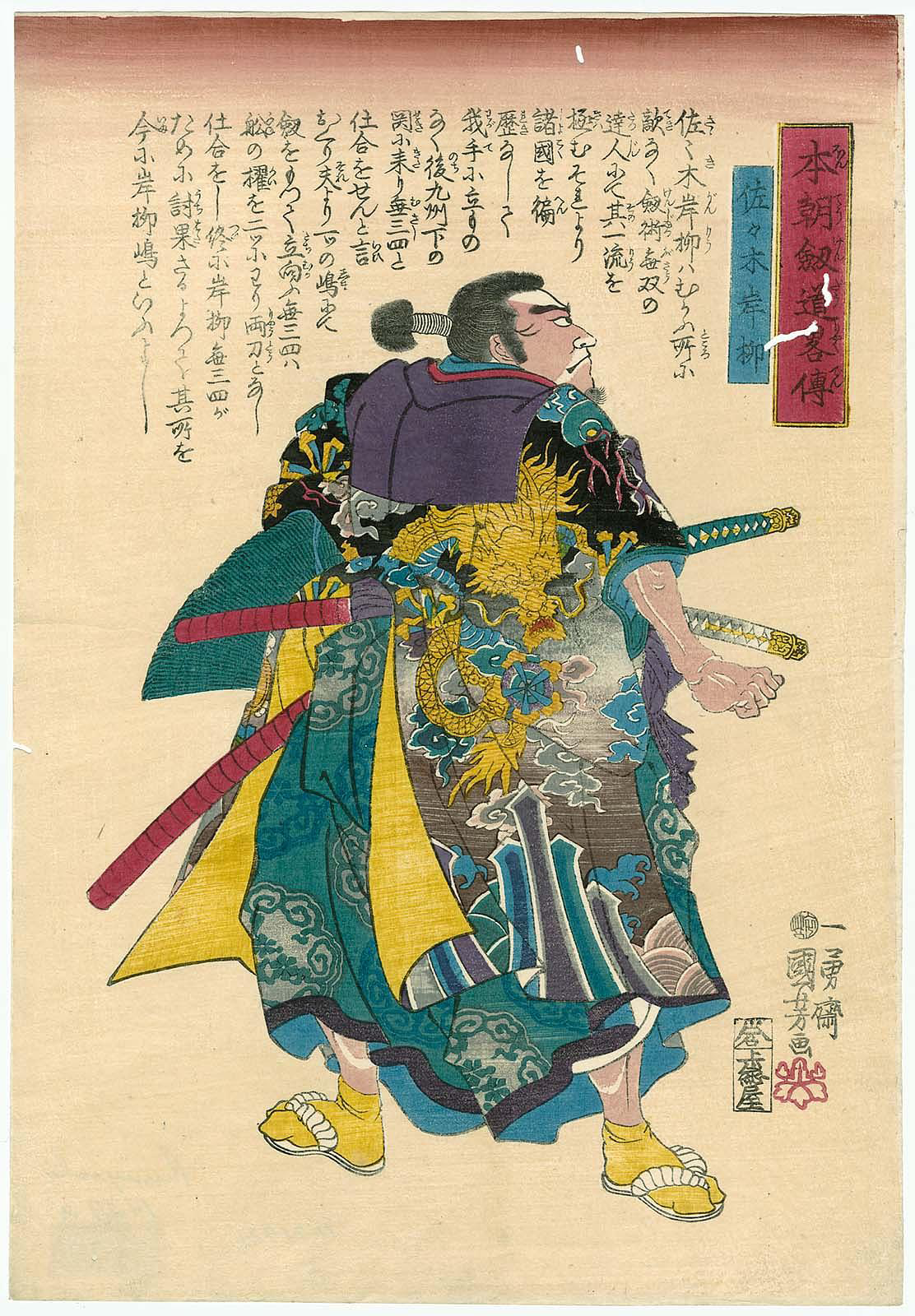
The legendary Sasaki Kojirō served as inspiration for Sephiroth.

Sephiroth was a collaborative effort between Yoshinori Kitase, Tetsuya Nomura, and scenario writer Kazushige Nojima. Sephiroth was a heroic SOLDIER operative just like Cloud. Kitase further said Sephiroth is not a copy of one character, but taking different aspects and merging them together resulted in the character shown in the game. In regards to his characterization, the character does not see himself as an evil being but instead a chosen man to accomplish a goal; changing the world throughout his chaos will reach the Promised Land, which is the opposite of what Cloud's group wants.

Sephiroth was designed by Final Fantasy VII's character designer Tetsuya Nomura. Nomura has stated that Sephiroth was made to be a contrast to the game's main protagonist, Cloud, who was originally designed to have slicked-back, black hair. Kitase believes Sephiroth's role in Final Fantasy VII to be one of the main reasons for the game's popularity. His name was derived from the Kabbalah, in which the ten sephirot on the Tree of life represent the ten attributes through which God reveals himself. His character and role as main antagonist existed from the earliest stages of development, as originally, Nomura thought that the game's plot would deal exclusively with Cloud Strife pursuing him. His weapon, the "Masamune" (正宗), which has been featured in numerous Final Fantasy titles, is an elongated nodachi that he learned to use during his days in SOLDIER. The Masamune is named after the famous Japanese swordsmith Goro Nyudo Masamune, whose blades are considered national treasures in Japan.

When designing Cloud and Sephiroth, Nomura was influenced by his view of their rivalry mirroring the legendary animosity between Miyamoto Musashi and Sasaki Kojirō, with Cloud and Sephiroth being Musashi and Kojirō respectively. Sephiroth's look was defined as "kakkoii", a Japanese term combining good looks with coolness. Yoshitaka Amano, who had handled character illustrations for previous Final Fantasy titles, noted a contrast between Cloud, a "young, passionate boy", and Sephiroth, a "more mature and cool" individual, as "intriguing", though not unusual as a pairing.

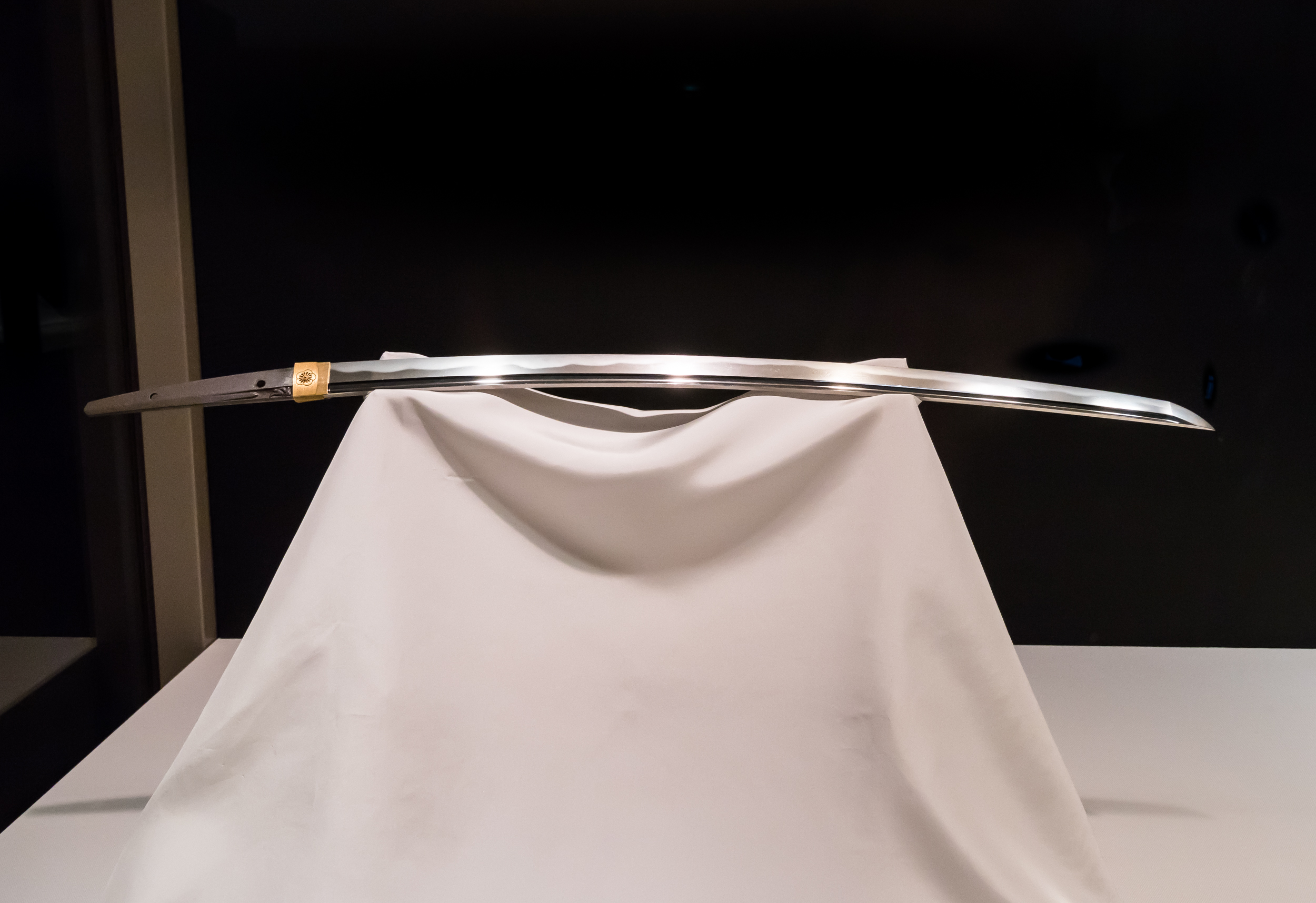
The katana nicknamed Kanze Masamune in the Tokyo National Museum

Nomura wanted Sephiroth to appear early on in the game, and then have the plot deal with the protagonists following him, so that gamers would not meet the final boss until extremely late in the game. Sephiroth was initially going to be Aerith Gainsborough's sibling, as suggested by Nomura and indicated by their similar hairstyles. Later, however, Nomura suggested he was to be changed to Aerith's past love, whom she would remember upon meeting Cloud. This character was then changed to Zack Fair, and Sephiroth's prior relationship with Aerith that was suggested by Nomura was dropped. In early drafts of the game, Sephiroth's personality was brutal and cruel, with a strong-willed and calm ego. He was to suffer from Mako addiction, resulting in a semi-conscious state as a result of high exposure to Mako energy. Sephiroth was also intended to manipulate Cloud into believing that he was a creation of his will, but this aspect of the story was later abandoned. In another cut scene, when Sephiroth's physical body is first seen in the Northern Crater, it was to be female. Jason Greenberg, the only artist working on the original PC port, recalled a crash bug that happened during Sephiroth's Super Nova (スーパーノヴァ, Sūpānova) technique. Near the end of the development cycle, many team members were done with their work and helped to test the game as much as possible. Greenberg spent nearly 24 hours playtesting battle during development. Since his transformation into Safer Sephiroth in the game's final battle, Sephiroth has had a single black wing on his back, referencing his theme song "One Winged Angel".

=== Later Final Fantasy works ===
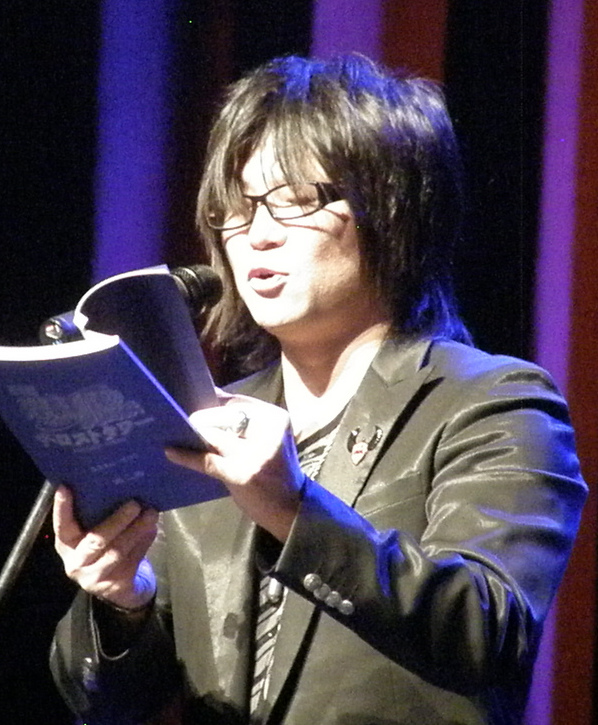
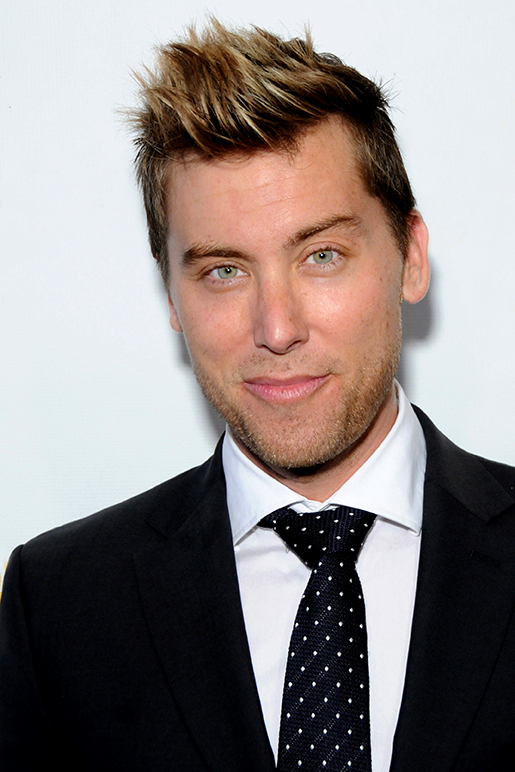
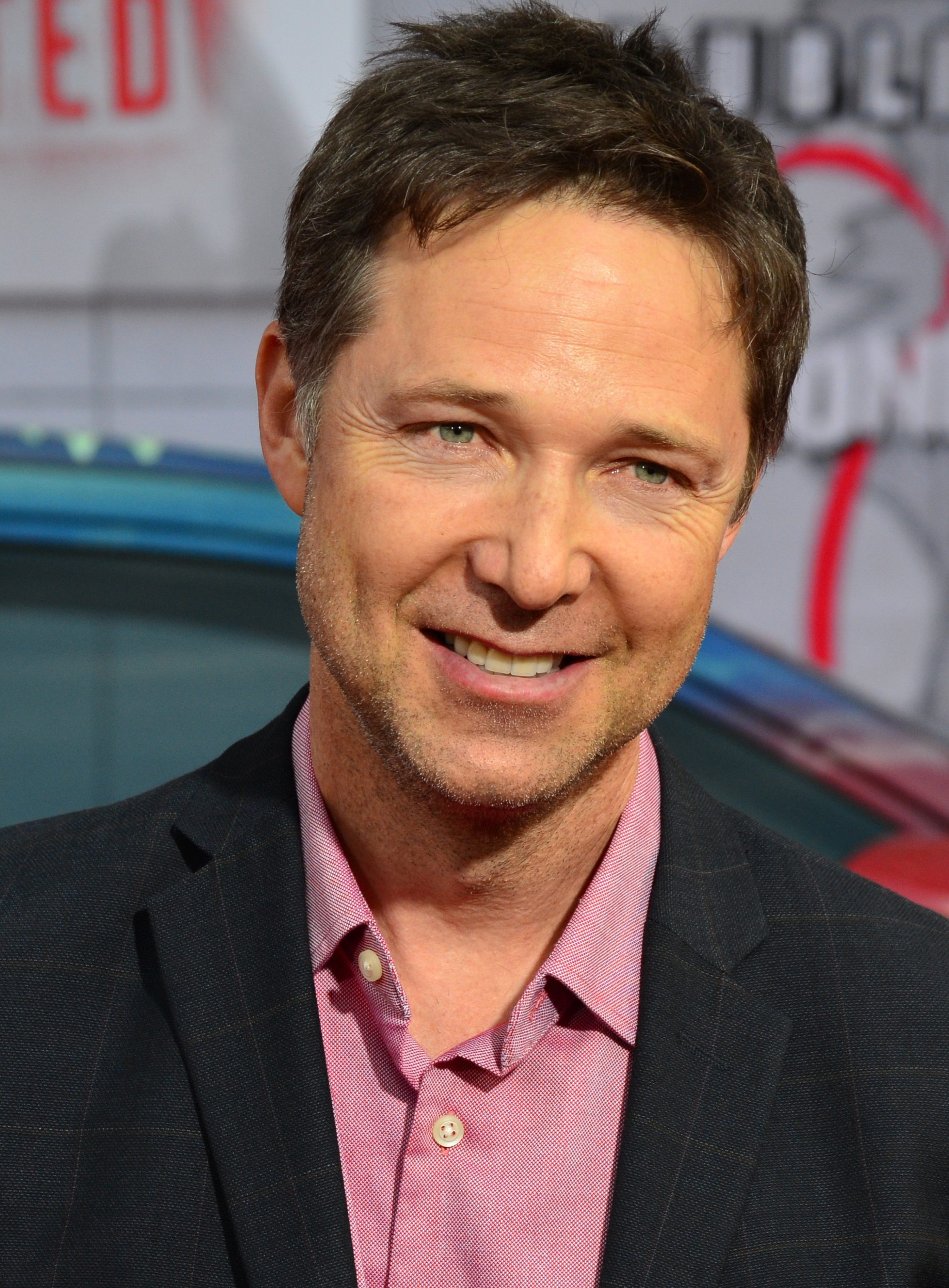
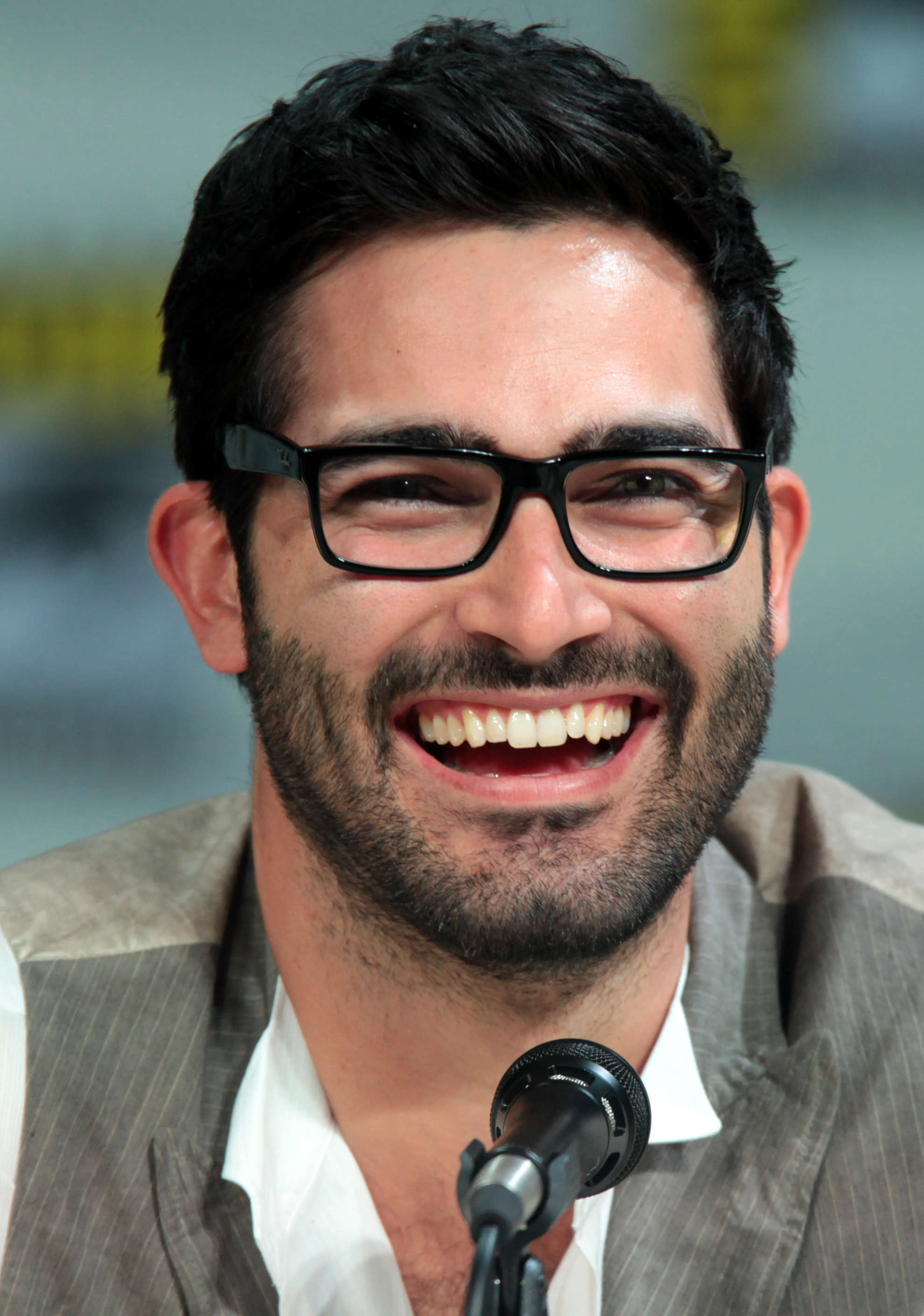
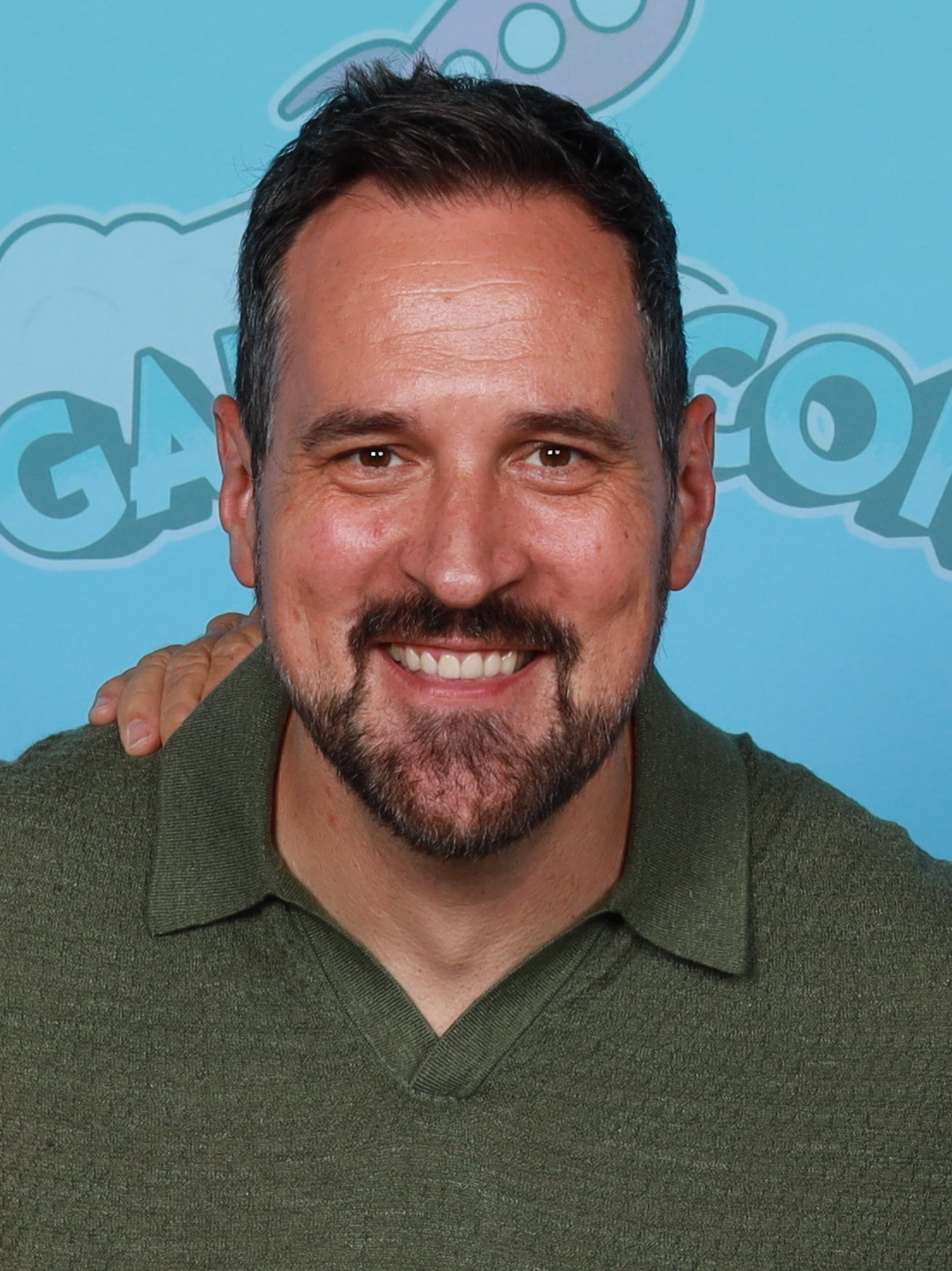
While Toshiyuki Morikawa (first from the left) has consistently voiced Sephiroth in Japanese, multiple actors have voiced him in English: Lance Bass, George Newbern, Tyler Hoechlin, and Travis Willingham (left to right, starting from the second from the left).

Nomura has called Sephiroth "the ultimate antagonist in the Final Fantasy VII saga, there can't be anyone else", and regards him as an enemy from a previous generation, in contrast to his "Remnants" who appear in Final Fantasy VII: Advent Children. For Advent Children, the film sequel to Final Fantasy VII, scriptwriter Kazushige Nojima thought that the film's plot would be less entertaining without Sephiroth. His revival in the film was introduced in the early stages of development, but the official decision as to how to bring him back was not reached until later. Nomura originally planned to have him appear from the start, but as it took the staff two years to develop his design, the idea of his presence throughout the film was scrapped, and it was decided instead to have him only appear onscreen for a short time. Sephiroth was designed for the film to emphasize his other-worldliness, such as the fact that he is never seen blinking or breathing, and his voice is always monotone and calm. In the film, the staff stated that his strength had considerably increased, to the point that he had "ascended to a new level of existence".

Despite initially encountering problems as to who would voice him, Nomura said that once Toshiyuki Morikawa auditioned for the role, they knew they had their actor. Morikawa was instructed by the staff to speak all of Sephiroth's dialogue as if he felt superior to every other character in the film. The voice director and Morikawa agreed to make Sephiroth's voice sound calm to the point that he believes he cannot lose to Cloud, suggesting to Morikawa that he may reappear at some point in the future. In the prequel Crisis Core, Morikawa portrayed Sephiroth in a charismatic fashion, as early on Sephiroth is presented as a hero. The black wing that Sephiroth and the other Shinra experiments Angeal and Genesis show act as a sign of corruption.

For Final Fantasy VII Remake, Yoshinori Kitase wanted Sephiroth to have more scenes than in the original game due to his popularity, and compared him with the build of the film Jaws. In the climax of the remake, Cloud encounters Sephiroth once again, and his words following the fight were kept as ambiguous. While Remake and Rebirth focus on the adult Sephiroth, the mobile phone Ever Crisis and First SOLDIER focus on Sephiroth's childhood. He is given a more sensitive characterization as he interacts with other characters related to SOLDIER. Nomura reworked the design to fit properly, focusing more on his shorter hair. Yuichiro Umehara was shocked upon being cast for Sephiroth's role in the game, pressured due to how Morikawa already established Sephiroth's popularity in previous installments. He was influenced by Morikawa's presence when recording for the game to the point he feared Sephiroth did not sound as young as requested by the demands. As a result, he often talked with the director and the rest of the staff about how he should sound.

== Musical themes ==
"Advent: One-Winged Angel"
The revised "One-Winged Angel" theme in Advent Children.

In Final Fantasy VII, Sephiroth is the focus of two pieces of music written by series composer Nobuo Uematsu. His primary theme is "Those Chosen by the Planet" (星に選ばれし者, Hoshi ni Erabareshi Mono), a piece utilizing bells, low drums, and a deep chorus, which accompanies his appearances throughout the game. In the final battle, "Birth of a God" (神の誕生, Kami no Tanjō) plays while the player fights Sephiroth's first form, "Bizarro Sephiroth", also known as "Reverse Sephiroth". This piece uses an instrumental version of the choral leitmotif prominently featured in "Those Chosen By The Planet."

The most well-known piece is "One-Winged Angel" (片翼の天使, Katayoku no Tenshi; lit. "An Angel With a Wing on One Side") which is played during the final confrontation with Sephiroth in his new "Safer" form. It contains Latin lyrics taken from sections of the Carmina Burana. In an interview featured on G4's Game Makers (formerly Icons), Uematsu revealed that the piece was designed to be a fusion of the musical styles of Russian composer Igor Stravinsky and rock musician Jimi Hendrix. Additionally, according to an interview with Polygon, Uematsu composed the piece by writing out various phrases over the course of two weeks and putting them together as if it was a puzzle. The song revolves around his character, as this was what Uematsu was thinking about when writing it.

Three official covers have been done of the song. The first is an orchestration used in Kingdom Hearts, arranged by series composer Yoko Shimomura. The second is used in Advent Children, which plays throughout the battle between Cloud and Sephiroth and features the progressive metal stylings of Nobuo Uematsu's former band The Black Mages, as well as orchestral elements and new lyrics. The third is the orchestral version performed in the Distant Worlds concert series. Additional versions include "Vengeance on the World" from Crisis Core: Final Fantasy VII, "One-Winged Angel: Rebirth" from Final Fantasy VII: Remake, and "One-Winged Angel: Reborn" from Final Fantasy VII: Rebirth.

== Appearances ==
=== In Final Fantasy VII ===
Ever since his transformation into the boss "Safer Sephiroth", the character has always been illustrated alongside a black wing, symbolizing his dark and divine nature.

Sephiroth is the main antagonist in Final Fantasy VII, who first appears after assassinating President Shinra. It is revealed over the course of the game that Sephiroth was once the most powerful member of SOLDIER, Shinra's elite military division, who was celebrated as a heroic veteran of the Shinra-Wutai war. After the war, Sephiroth was sent on a mission to the village of Nibelheim, where he discovered that he was the product of a biological experiment that combined a human fetus with tissue from the extraterrestrial lifeform Jenova. Upon discovering the truth of his origins and the experiments that created him, Sephiroth developed an intense hatred for Shinra, which developed into hatred for all life. After learning that Jenova, who he comes to consider his "mother", attempted to take control of the Planet 2,000 years ago, he decided to follow in her footsteps and become a god who would rule over the Planet. He burnt down Nibelheim, resulting in the deaths of many people, but was assumed dead after a confrontation with Cloud inside a nearby Mako reactor; this event came to be known as the Nibelheim incident. However, Cloud does not believe he killed Sephiroth, since his skill and might dwarfs his, and acknowledges Sephiroth most likely had won, but spared him for unknown reasons. However, a few years later, Sephiroth reappears, determined to continue with his mission.

His plan to become a god is based upon his belief that he can merge with the Planet's Lifestream, taking control of it and the Planet itself. To do so, he must summon Meteor, a destructive meteorite entity from outer space capable of catastrophically damaging the Planet. At this point, the Lifestream will flow to attempt to heal the injury, allowing Sephiroth to merge with it and its Spirit Energy. Despite appearing multiple times throughout the game, it is revealed that Sephiroth's physical body is sealed in the Northern Crater. The Sephiroth Cloud and his allies fought were parts of Jenova's body taking on his appearance and remotely controlled by Sephiroth from the Planet's core. In the game's final battle, Sephiroth takes on two final forms. The first is called Bizarro Sephiroth, which is known as Libath Sephiroth (リバース・セフィロス, Ribāsu Sefirosu) in the original Japanese version, meaning "The Core of Sephiroth" or "Sephiroth's Core" in Hebrew (ליבת ספירות). The second is called Safer Sephiroth, which is known as Seifa Sephiroth (セーファ・セフィロス, Sēfa Sefirosu) in the original Japanese version, meaning "Final Sephiroth" or "The Last Part of Sephiroth" in Hebrew (סיפא ספירות). After his defeat, Sephiroth reappears only to Cloud as an apparition, and the exhausted duo fight once again. Cloud eventually wins the fight and kills Sephiroth via stabbing him with his sword. Defeated, he laments on his loss before exploding into small beams of light which fade away. With Sephiroth dead, Aerith's prior magic deflects the meteor towards only Midgar, shielding the rest of the world from its impact. Many years later, Midgar is shown to be healing, possibly being able to be saved in the years to come.

=== In Compilation of Final Fantasy VII ===
Sephiroth makes several cameo appearances in the Final Fantasy VII prequel, Before Crisis, in which he supports Shinra in their battle against the eco-terrorist organization AVALANCHE. The Nibelheim incident is also featured in the game. The OVA Last Order also depicts the Nibelheim incident. Sephiroth also appears in Advent Children, a CGI film set two years after Final Fantasy VII. In the film, Kadaj, Loz, and Yazoo, his "Remnants", try to reincarnate him. Although Kadaj eventually succeeds, Cloud once again defeats Sephiroth, whose body changes back to Kadaj's upon his defeat. Sephiroth is also the focus of the On the Way to a Smile novella "Case of the Lifestream — Black and White". The story is set after the end of Final Fantasy VII but prior to the events of Advent Children, and centers on Aerith and Sephiroth's journeys through the Lifestream and Sephiroth's creation of Geostigma, a disease that infects anyone who came into contact with the tainted Lifestream. He is mentioned in Dirge of Cerberus, a game set one year after Advent Children, in which his biological mother, Lucrecia Crescent, discusses the experiments which gave birth to him.

==== Crisis Core: Final Fantasy VII ====
Sephiroth is one of the main characters in the Final Fantasy VII prequel Crisis Core, in which he and protagonist Zack Fair search for two missing SOLDIERs, Genesis Rhapsodos and Angeal Hewley, This game also depicts the Nibelheim incident, where Sephiroth appears as a boss. Executive producer Yoshinori Kitase was pleased with Sephiroth's role in Crisis Core, feeling that he was given a more human side.

==== Remake and Rebirth continuity ====
Sephiroth appears in Final Fantasy VII Remake as the main antagonist. While his role as a presumed dead Shinra SOLDIER remain similar, Sephiroth now appears in the early hours of the game as an illusion to taunt Cloud and warn him to leave the Planet. He also projects himself as a "Sephiroth-clone" named Marco. In the final hours, Sephiroth appears in the Shinra building, showcasing his goal to summon Meteor destroying Midgar; and killing President Shinra before fleeing. After the group escapes Shinra's troops, Sephiroth awaits them at the end of the Midgar Expressway, where he acts as the final boss. Defeated, Sephiroth spares Cloud and gives him "seven seconds until the end" before disappearing, leaving behind only a fallen black feather.

In Final Fantasy VII Rebirth, Sephiroth appears as a playable character and party member in the game's first chapter "Fall of a Hero", which depicts their survey for the Nibelheim's reactor, and his villainous origins with the infamous Nibelheim incident. In the present time, Sephiroth taunts Cloud again with illusions. He is then pursued by Cloud and the party, where they encounter Sephiroth-clones as well. Sephiroth later manipulates Cloud into giving him the "Black Materia" to summon Meteor. When Aerith attempts to stop him by summoning Cloud into an alternate reality, Sephiroth appears behind and swiftly kills her, prompting the party to avenge her. However, Sephiroth transforms into "Sephiroth Reborn" and upon defeat, flees into the northern regions.

=== Other appearances ===
Sephiroth has appeared in various other franchises. He also appeared as a cameo in Monster Hunter 4 Ultimate as a weapon, which was designed as a single black wing, referencing Sephiroth's appearance during the final battle of Final Fantasy VII. Sephiroth was included as a playable fighter in Super Smash Bros. Ultimate, as the third fighter in Fighters Pass Vol. 2. Despite being officially released on December 22, 2020, he was made available five days prior for a limited time via an event called the Sephiroth Challenge, in which the player must defeat him in a Final Fantasy-themed stamina match.

Sephiroth's actual first appearance outside Final Fantasy VII was as a selectable character in the fighting game Ehrgeiz. A redesigned Sephiroth also appears in the North American and European versions of Kingdom Hearts as an optional boss character in Olympus Coliseum. Lance Bass voiced Sephiroth in the game, while in subsequent titles he was replaced by George Newbern. In the Japanese re-release of the game, Final Mix, an additional scene was added in which Sephiroth fights Cloud, although the result of the fight is not revealed. Sephiroth was not included in the sequel Kingdom Hearts: Chain of Memories, as director Tetsuya Nomura could not give him a storyline related to Cloud, and feared negative fan response if Sephiroth did not have a notable role in the story. He reappears as an optional boss in Kingdom Hearts II, where he is first encountered by the series' protagonist, Sora, and then Cloud, who is pursuing him. When Sephiroth battles Cloud, both of them disappear, with Sora believing that they went somewhere else to continue their fight. Nomura said that in the game, Sephiroth represents Cloud's dark side, in contrast to Tifa Lockhart, who represents his light side. Although Sephiroth does not appear in the prequel Kingdom Hearts Birth by Sleep, he is mentioned as a hero that Zack Fair aspires to be. The staff, however, did not know if they would portray him as a being of darkness like he was depicted as in other titles. Due to Sephiroth's many appearances as a boss in the Kingdom Hearts series, Square Enix decided he would not return in Kingdom Hearts III, as it would be redundant. Sephiroth also appears in the Itadaki Street games Special and Portable as an unlockable playable character.

Sephiroth was also the representative villain of Final Fantasy VII in Dissidia Final Fantasy, and is featured in his FFVII guise, while an alternative outfit features his "Safer Sephiroth" form. His fight against Cloud in the game was based on their fights from Final Fantasy VII and Advent Children. Along with the rest of the VII characters in Dissidia, Sephiroth appears in the prequel Dissidia 012. The game includes a slightly altered Final Fantasy VII form for Sephiroth, as well as his Kingdom Hearts design. Sephiroth returns as a playable character opposite Cloud in the third entry, Dissidia NT. His form from Final Fantasy VII Remake also appeared in Final Fantasy Brave Exvius, and his appearance was carried over to its 2026 adaptation Final Fantasy Resonance where he appears as an optional superboss. He is featured in the rhythm game Theatrhythm Final Fantasy and its sequel, Curtain Call, as an unlockable character, representing Final Fantasy VII.

== Merchandise ==
Sephiroth has served as the basis for several types of merchandise, such as the "Extra Knights" action figures first published by Bandai in Japan in 1997. A different model was released as part of the Play Arts collection, following the release of Advent Children. At the 2008 San Diego Comic-Con, Kanji Tashiro, Square Enix's manager of merchandise, said that the figure was one of their best-selling items. With the release of the film, Sephiroth was also included in a series of promotional material, primarily consisting of posters. Kotobukiya has included the character in numerous merchandise, including a series of cold casts based on his appearance in both the original game and the film sequel. As part of promotional campaigns organized in Japan by Square Enix and Coca-Cola, a version of Sephiroth drawn in a super deformed style was featured in the first two volumes of a promotional collection.

Products not connected to the release of games or films have also been produced. These include a figure as part of the Final Fantasy Trading Arts Vol. 1 series, a set as part of the Square Minimum Collection alongside Cloud, and a rare figure of "Safer Sephiroth" as part of the Final Fantasy Creatures series (Chromium). "Reverse Sephiroth" was also released as a normal figure in volume 2. A figure based on his appearances in the Kingdom Hearts games was released in the second series of the Play Arts Kingdom Hearts sub-line. Some replica weapon companies have produced replicas of Sephiroth's sword, the Masamune, as a 6-foot-long (1.8 m) katana with a stainless steel unsharpened blade. A statue at Kyoto University depicting Sephiroth was also made. Sephiroth received an amiibo figurine for use in Super Smash Bros. Ultimate, which was released in January 2022.

The OLED update to the Steam Deck, which was announced in 2023, replaces the system's accelerated processing unit (APU), built using 7 nm processing and nicknamed Aerith, with a newer 6 nm-based APU named Sephiroth.

== Reception ==
On multiple occasions, numerous gaming magazines, including Guinness World Records Gamer's Edition, described Sephiroth as one of the best video game bosses, and best villains from both the Final Fantasy series and in video games. Dave Smith of IGN called him the "heavyweight champion of Final Fantasy villains", and praised his appearance and backstory. Sephiroth was also named the 14th-best character of all time in Dengeki PlayStation's retrospective awards feature about the original PlayStation. Professional wrestler Kenny Omega wore a Sephiroth-style ring outfit with a "One-Winged-Angel" entrance at Wrestle Kingdom 17, and additionally sported the attire as part of a downloadable content bundle in the 2023 remake of the 2014 game Like a Dragon: Ishin!. Film producer Adi Shankar cites Sephiroth as an artistic and stylistic influence.

=== Critical response ===
In Reverse Design: Final Fantasy VII, it was noted that Sephiroth's desire for world domination makes him come across as simpleminded, but the lack of humanity in his background serves as the cause for this characterization. It was also noted that Sephiroth may come across as lost in his own insanity, he is also intelligent and cunning. Although Sephiroth is not based on any mythical figure, in The Secret Mythology of Final Fantasy, his final boss form was compared to 777 and Other Qabalistic Writings of Aleister Crowley, which also explores Hermetic Qabalah. PCGamer saw Sephiroth as Cloud's shadow, who he has to surpass as his mental issues and vulnerability are connected to their past, which Kotaku agreed with. Sephiroth has often been regarded as one of the best bosses in gaming history thanks to Final Fantasy VII. AnimeFringe called him "the most notorious villain in the entire Final Fantasy series" and "quintessential bishōnen in the eyes of many fans -- male and female", comparing him with Kefka and praising his complexity. According to Inside Games, Sephiroth stands out from previous Final Fantasy games because his humanity and heroic nature is early explored which draws parallels to famous figures like Sasaki Kojirō or the lead character from Vampire Hunter D. The scene in which Sephiroth kills Aerith has also prompted much commentary. GamesRadar+ called him "the biggest cock blocker in the gaming world", as writer Shane Patterson found Aerith's character to be appealing, and due to the fact Sephiroth killed her, players were no longer able to use her. Also referring to the scene as a shocking moment, GameSpot suggested that the FMV sequence of Sephiroth appearing in front of the Nibelheim fire "might be one of the most recognizable cutscenes ever to grace video games". Matt Leone of Polygon stated that Aerith's death remained emotionally impactful despite the PlayStation's limited graphics and animation.

However, some game editors have criticized Sephiroth's character. IGN's Smith has stated that "Sephiroth was certainly a good-looking fellow, but his motivations were about as clear as mud". When comparing Sephiroth with the Final Fantasy VI villain, Kefka Palazzo, GamesRadar commented that he "seems as interesting as a dead accountant painted brown", while Screen Rant said that "Sephiroth is an iconic character, but not the most interesting villain to emerge from the Final Fantasy franchise". GameSpy editor Ryan Scott called Sephiroth the "King of Overrated Characters" during its villain feature for Dissidia Final Fantasy, arguing that gamers were impressed by him only because of his design and him murdering Aerith.

Critics have also commented on Sephiroth's role in works. Destructoid noted there was a message within the writing of the film regarding the characters' lives in Midgar, as the people of Midgar are able to move on with their lives, but Cloud is unable to due to past trauma. They compared this to how the team behind Final Fantasy VII and its fans are still attached to it and unable to move on. Kotaku saw the focus on Midgar's ruins as a parallel with psychological trauma due to how its survivors are suffering from Geostigma, a disease that cannot be fought physically, in contrast to Cloud's fights with Sephiroth. Yoshinori Kitase stated that the popularity of the fight between Cloud and Sephiroth caused Japanese gamers to do a remake of it for Dissidia Final Fantasy and expected that Western fans would also emulate it. In relation to Crisis Core, IGN AU said that "even Sephiroth gets his moments in the sun", praising the depth in his backstory, which would later make his boss battle more entertaining. IGN UK had a similar sentiment, stating that his character was granted "a more human dimension" and enjoying the events from before his descent into villainy. Though Meristation found Sephiroth to be more friendly in the prequel, his relationship with Genesis was criticized for influencing his decisions rather than him acting of his own will. In the book The World of Final Fantasy VII: Essays on the Game and Its Legacy, it is stated that Sephiroth's realization of his connection with Jenova and his descent into villainy caused him to lose his humanity. Sephiroth claims he will never die, most notably in Advent Children, as upon being defeated by Cloud, he tells him "I will never be a memory". His origins as a test subject to Hojo have been compared to Frankenstein's monster.

The idea that there are four characters with Sephiroth's name led VG247 to note the remake still had its own mysteries that original players would not understand while the title. Siliconera described this incarnation of Sephiroth as haunting, due to how he often appears within Cloud's hallucinations across the plot. Electronic Gaming Monthly felt the remake's depiction of Sephiroth was more menacing than in the original due to his constant threats towards Cloud. Tyler Hoechlin's work as Sephiroth was the subject of praise. Final Fantasy VII: Ever Crisis's depiction of a young Sephiroth drew praise from fans. Sephiroth being playable in Rebirth also attracted positive response due to his friendlier relationship with Cloud during their visit to Nibelheim.

Several writers also noted Sephiroth's overpowered nature as a Kingdom Hearts boss, noting that, regardless of the player's skill, "walking away from this match unscathed" is not possible, and stating that the fight was more difficult than the entirety of Final Fantasy VII. AnimeFringe stated that only advanced gamers would be able to defeat Kingdom Hearts's Sephiroth, as the player has no backup and his "devastating attacks can kill in seconds". After the addition of Sephiroth to Super Smash Bros. Ultimate, game director Masahiro Sakurai acknowledged the belief that there are too many sword fighters in the roster, stating that "Well, even if it is another sword fighter, it will be fine as long as we balance them properly". Chris Carter of Destructoid and Ethan Gach of Kotaku both praised the addition of Sephiroth.

== See also ==
- List of Final Fantasy VII characters
