= Compilation of Final Fantasy VII =

Metaseries produced by Square Enix

- The Compilation of Final Fantasy VII logo
- Developer: Square Enix
- Publisher: Square Enix
- Creators: Tetsuya Nomura; Yoshinori Kitase
- Platforms: Android; iOS; Nintendo Switch; Nintendo Switch 2; PlayStation 2; PlayStation 4; PlayStation 5; PlayStation Portable; Windows; Xbox One; Xbox Series X/S
- First release: Before Crisis: Final Fantasy VII; September 24, 2004
- Latest release: Final Fantasy VII Rebirth; February 29, 2024
- Parent series: Final Fantasy

The Compilation of Final Fantasy VII is a metaseries produced by Square Enix. A subseries stemming from the main Final Fantasy franchise, it is a collection of video games, animated features, and short stories set in the world and continuity of Final Fantasy VII (1997). Officially announced in 2003 with the reveal of Final Fantasy VII: Advent Children, the series' core products are three video games and one film release. Alongside these are tie-in products and spin-offs including books, mobile games, and an original video animation. Advent Children and the mobile title Before Crisis are a sequel and prequel to VII respectively, focusing on Cloud Strife, the original game's main protagonist, and covert operatives known as the Turks. Crisis Core follows Zack Fair, a minor character in VII, while Dirge of Cerberus, a sequel to Advent Children, follows Vincent Valentine, one of the original's optional characters. The series has since been expanded to include more products, most notably a planned trilogy of games remaking the 1997 original; the first installment in this trilogy, Final Fantasy VII Remake, was released in 2020, while the second installment, Final Fantasy VII Rebirth, was released in 2024 and the third and final installment, Final Fantasy VII Revelation, will release in 2027.

The series was conceived by Yoshinori Kitase, the original game's director, and Tetsuya Nomura, the main character designer. Nomura would become the main designer for each entry in the Compilation. Other returning staff include writer Kazushige Nojima, art director Yusuke Naora, and composer Nobuo Uematsu. The video games belong to different genres, with none of them being traditional role-playing games due to production pressures related to the genre. While the first title revealed was Advent Children, it ran into delays during post-production, so the first Compilation title to be released was the mobile game Before Crisis.

Of the core titles, Before Crisis is the only one still unreleased in the west due to issues with overseas platform compatibility and staff changes. Reception of titles in the Compilation has been mixed, with Advent Children being praised for its visuals and criticized for its confusing nature. Before Crisis, Crisis Core, Remake, and Rebirth have all received praise from critics, while Dirge of Cerberus garnered a mixed response. The presentation of the Compilation as a whole has met with a mixed response, and later staff linked it to the decline of the Final Fantasy series' prestige in the West. The Compilation inspired the creation of Fabula Nova Crystallis Final Fantasy, a similar subseries of linked video games.

== Titles ==
Release timeline
1997	Final Fantasy VII
1998–2003
2004	Before Crisis: Final Fantasy VII
2005	Final Fantasy VII: Advent Children
2005	Last Order: Final Fantasy VII
2006	Dirge of Cerberus: Final Fantasy VII
2006	Dirge of Cerberus Lost Episode: Final Fantasy VII
2007	Crisis Core: Final Fantasy VII
2008
2009	Final Fantasy VII: On the Way to a Smile
2009	Final Fantasy VII: Advent Children Complete
2010
2011	Final Fantasy VII: The Kids Are Alright: A Turks Side Story
2012–2019
2020	Final Fantasy VII Remake
2021	Final Fantasy VII Remake Intergrade
2021	Final Fantasy VII Remake: Traces of Two Pasts
2021	Final Fantasy VII: The First Soldier
2022	Crisis Core: Final Fantasy VII Reunion
2023	Final Fantasy VII: Ever Crisis
2024	Final Fantasy VII Rebirth
2025
2026	Final Fantasy VII Rebirth: Dear Destiny
2027	Final Fantasy VII Revelation

=== Video games ===
- Before Crisis: Final Fantasy VII is an action role-playing video game split into 24 episodes, with episode delivery working via a monthly subscription-based distribution system. After going through beta testing in 2004, it was released on September 24, 2004, for NTT DoCoMo's FOMA iMode, and on January 30 and April 5, 2007, for SoftBank Mobile and EZweb respectively. The game was never released to western markets, despite plans to do so.
- Dirge of Cerberus: Final Fantasy VII is an action game featuring both first and third-person shooter elements. There was originally a multiplayer mode, but this was removed in the western version. It was released on January 26, August 15, and November 17, 2006, in Japan, North America, and Europe respectively. The localized version received an overhaul before release, as the developers were not pleased with the Japanese version of the game. An International version, featuring the improvements made to the localized version, was released in Japan on September 4, 2008, as part of Square Enix's Ultimate Hits lineup. A mobile spin-off taking place during the events of the game, Dirge of Cerberus Lost Episode: Final Fantasy VII, was released on August 22, 2006, in North America and July 26, 2007, in Japan.
- Crisis Core: Final Fantasy VII is an action role-playing game. Crisis Core has the player controlling Zack Fair in a real-time combat system enabling the player to move Zack around, activate abilities, and attack or block attacks from enemies. It was released on September 13, 2007, in Japan, and on March 24 and June 20, 2008, in North America and Europe respectively. A remaster of the game, Crisis Core: Final Fantasy VII Reunion, was released on December 13, 2022, for Nintendo Switch, PlayStation 4, PlayStation 5, Windows, Xbox One, and Xbox Series X/S.
- Final Fantasy VII Remake is an action role-playing game developed and published by Square Enix, released for PlayStation 4 on April 10, 2020. It is the first in a planned trilogy of games remaking the 1997 original. An expanded edition, Final Fantasy VII Remake Intergrade, was released for PlayStation 5.
- Final Fantasy VII: The First Soldier is a free-to-play battle royale multiplayer game for mobile phones released on November 17, 2021. Developed by Ateam Inc. and published by Square Enix, the game is set 18 years before the events of Final Fantasy VII. The First Soldier follows SOLDIER candidates and the establishment of SOLDIER by the Shinra Electric Power Company to bolster their military. The game's battles are set in a virtual reality recreation of Midgar, similar to the Virtual Reality System and Shinra Combat Simulator. Its gameplay features 3 versus 3 multiplayer arena matches, blending action elements traditional to the genre with RPG mechanics and Final Fantasy gameplay elements. Due to the nature of the gameplay, there is not much narrative element, but the setting and lore is incorporated into the game. Despite fairly regular updates, the game was shut down on January 11, 2023.
- Final Fantasy VII: Ever Crisis is a role-playing video game. Released in September 2023 for iOS and Android and in December 2023 for Windows, it is an episodic single-player game which retells the events of the canon Compilation titles while adding in new narrative material.
- Final Fantasy VII Rebirth is an action role-playing game developed and published by Square Enix, released for PlayStation 5 on February 29, 2024. The game is the second installment in the Remake trilogy, while also being made to stand on its own.
- Final Fantasy VII Revelation is an action role-playing game developed and published by Square Enix, scheduled to release for Nintendo Switch 2, PlayStation 5, Windows, and Xbox Series X/S on April 8, 2027. The game is a direct sequel to Final Fantasy VII Rebirth and the third and final installment of the Remake trilogy.

=== Films ===
- Final Fantasy VII: Advent Children, the first title conceived for the Compilation, the second to be released, and a direct-to-DVD sequel to VII. It was released in Japan on September 14, 2005, and on April 24 and 25, 2006 for Europe and North America respectively. It received a single special western cinema screening on April 3, 2006, at the Arclight Theatre in Los Angeles. A director's cut of the film, Advent Children Complete, was also produced, featuring graphical retouches, extra footage, and rerecorded voice work for the English and Japanese versions. Advent Children Complete was released as a Blu-ray exclusive in 2009 in North America (June 2), in Europe (July 27), and in Australia (October 7). A demo for Final Fantasy XIII was included in the Japanese limited edition set.
- Last Order: Final Fantasy VII, an original video animation detailing the destruction of the town of Nibelheim, a key event in VII. Last Order was packaged with a limited edition of Advent Children called Advent Pieces, released on September 14, 2005, in Japan and February 6, 2007, in North America. Advent Pieces was limited to a quantity of 77,777 copies. The OVA is no longer available to purchase. With the release of Remake, Last Order was removed from the official Compilation listing.
- On the Way to a Smile - Episode: Denzel is an original video animation adaptation of the story from Kazushige Nojima's On the Way to a Smile. It was released with the Advent Children Complete.

=== Books ===
- Final Fantasy VII: On the Way to a Smile is a collection of short stories written by Kazushige Nojima to promote Advent Children and Advent Children Complete. A total of seven stories were collected into a single paperback volume and released on April 16, 2009. The English version was released by Yen Press on October 30, 2018.
- Final Fantasy VII: The Kids Are Alright: A Turks Side Story, a novel and second book by Kazushige Nojima set a short time before Advent Children. The novel was illustrated by Shou Tajima and released on December 15, 2011. The English version was released by Yen Press on January 22, 2019.
- Final Fantasy VII Remake: Traces of Two Pasts, a novel also authored by Nojima, was released on July 15, 2021, in Japanese and March 20, 2023, in English. It takes place during the early events of Final Fantasy VII: Rebirth and features Aerith and Tifa exchanging stories from their pasts.
- Final Fantasy VII Rebirth: Dear Destiny, a third novel by Nojima, a sequel to Traces of Two Pasts that continues the stories of Tifa and Aerith before the events of the main story of the Remake. It was released in Japanese on January 30, 2026.

=== Related media ===
A novella Hoshi o Meguru Otome (The Maiden Who Travels The Planet) was written by Benny Matsuyama and published in the Final Fantasy VII Ultimania Guide in 2005. The story describes Aerith's journey through the Lifestream during the second half of the original game. Despite being authorized by Square Enix the novella is disputed by some fans on whether it is canon and part of the Compilation. A Square Enix Customer Support e-mail stated that it was official, while others claim the story overlaps and contradicts with the events from "Case of Lifestream - Black & White" story from later novel On the Way to a Smile. It was also never officially localized in English, however various fan translations exist.

A mobile racing game based on a mini game from VII, Final Fantasy VII G-Bike, was released on October 30, 2014, for iOS and Android. A western release for the title was planned. It was developed by Japan-based developer CyberConnect2 as part of a planned subseries of mobile games based on VII's mini games. While related to VII and the Compilation due to its nature, the developers confirmed that it was not related to nor affected the Compilation itself. Due to difficulties delivering continual satisfactory service, G-Bike was shut down in 2015 without seeing a Western release.

== Setting ==
The setting of Final Fantasy VII is a world that has been described as an industrial or post-industrial science fiction milieu. It is referred to as "the Planet" by the series characters, and was retroactively named "Gaia" in some Square Enix promotional material and by game staff. The planet's lifeforce is called the Lifestream, a flow of spiritual energy that gives life to everything on the Planet. Its processed form is known as "Mako". During VII and its prequels, the Lifestream is being used by the megacorporation Shinra as an energy source. This is in turn causing the Planet to dangerously weaken, threatening the existence of everything and everyone on the planet. The main narrative of VII focuses on an eco-terrorist group known as AVALANCHE, chronicling their conflict with Shinra president Rufus Shinra and his subordinates, including the covert Turks, and SOLDIER, an elite fighting force created by giving humans raw Mako. Eventually, all come under threat from Sephiroth, a member of SOLDIER created through Shinra experimentation and driven mad when he learns the truth about his origins, and Jenova, an alien lifeform which seeks to destroy all life on the Planet. Among the main characters are Cloud Strife, a mercenary and self-proclaimed ex-SOLDIER, Aerith Gainsborough, a flower seller and last member of an ancient tribe known as the Cetra, Tifa Lockhart, Cloud's childhood friend, and Vincent Valentine, a former Turk who was made immortal by Shinra experimentation. During the conflict, Sephiroth summons a destructive spell called Meteor to mortally wound the Planet. When Aerith attempts to summon Holy, a defense mechanism that can stop Meteor, she is killed by Sephiroth. Eventually, the party are successful in defeating Sephiroth, and the Lifestream reinforces Holy, successfully stopping Meteor.

The Compilation titles act as continuations and expansions on the core narrative, with them focusing on various characters. Advent Children begins two years after VII, when people across the world are succumbing to a disease called Geostigma and Cloud, suffering from guilt, is forced to confront Kadaj, Loz and Yazoo, avatars of Sephiroth's will. Before Crisis begins six years prior to the events of VII, and follows the confrontations between the Turks and the original incarnation of AVALANCHE. Crisis Core takes place in a similar time period, but follows events from the point of view of Zack Fair, a SOLDIER who befriended Cloud and was killed by Shinra troops after turning against the company. Among the characters who interact with Zack is Genesis Rhapsodos, a member of SOLDIER who successfully rebels and eventually decides to protect the Planet. Dirge of Cerberus is set a year after Advent Children, and focuses on Vincent's conflict against Deepground, a sect of SOLDIER that was trapped beneath the city of Midgar during Meteor's descent. Last Order takes place during the events at Nibelheim, where Jenova was originally stored and Sephiroth first found out about himself.

== Production ==
=== Creation ===
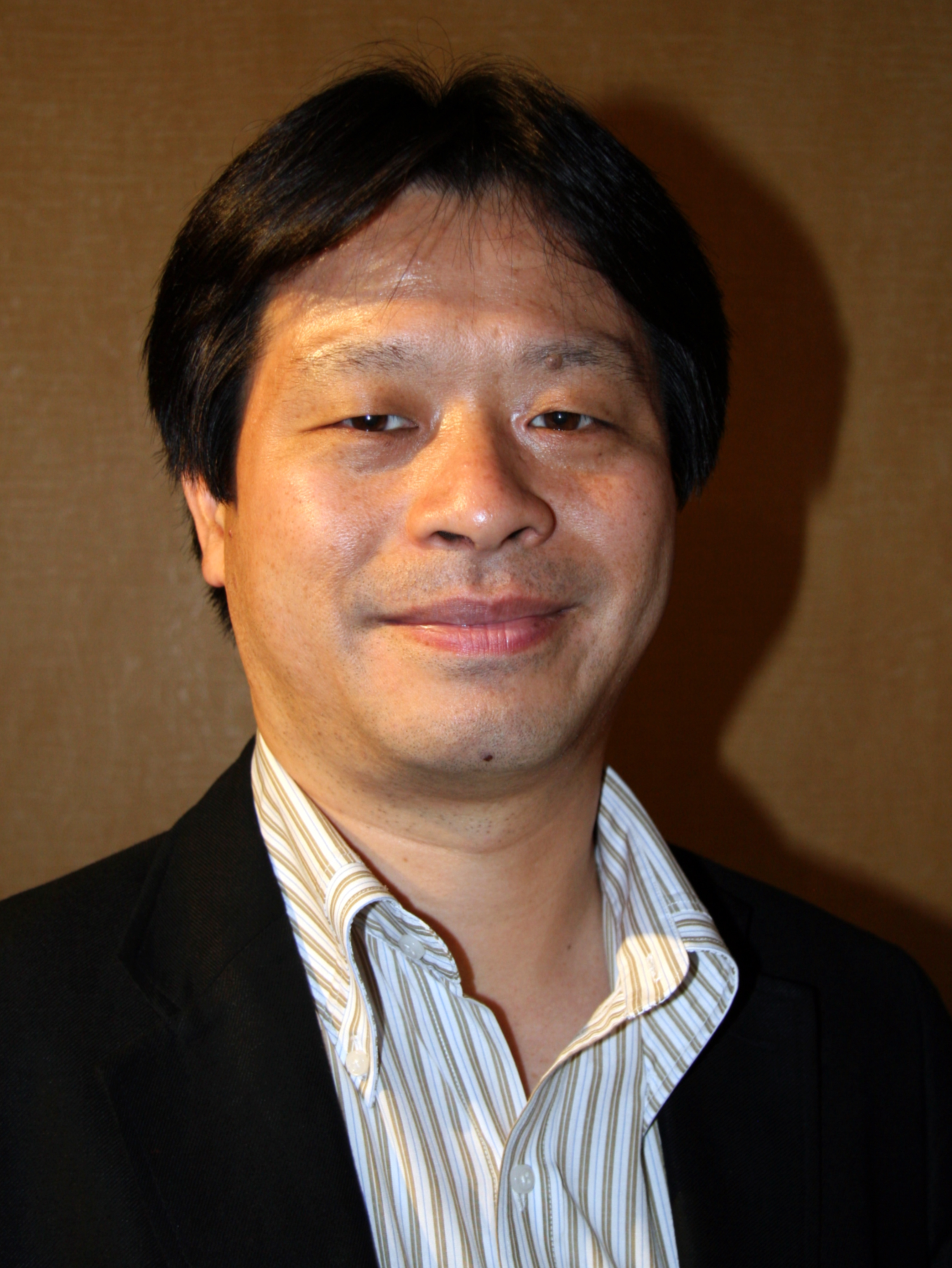
Final Fantasy VII director and Compilation co-creator Yoshinori Kitase at the 2009 Electronic Entertainment Expo

The Compilation of Final Fantasy VII was created by Yoshinori Kitase and Tetsuya Nomura, the respective director and character designer for Final Fantasy VII. It was at one point defined by Square Enix as their first step towards "polymorphic content", a marketing and sales strategy to "[provide] well-known properties on several platforms, allowing exposure of the products to as wide an audience as possible". Speaking on why VII had been chosen for such a project, Kitase explained that the ending left far more development opportunities open for characters and setting than other games in the series. There was also a strong financial benefit to creating the Compilation—following the unprecedented financial upturn prompted by the release of Final Fantasy X-2 just prior to the 2003 merger of Square and Enix into Square Enix, then-CEO Yoichi Wada decided that the company could tap into fan demands for continuations of the story of Final Fantasy VII.

The first title to be conceived was Advent Children, originally envisioned as a short film presentation created by Visual Works, the animation studio behind CGI cutscenes for the company's games. Early in pre-production, plans to make Advent Children a video game rather than a film were considered, but due to several factors including Visual Works' lack of experience with actual game production, it remained a film. One of the main conditions for the project's launch was to reunite the original staff members of Final Fantasy VII: Nojima, art director Yusuke Naora, and composer Nobuo Uematsu. After Advent Children began development, it was decided by the team that one title was not enough to fully explore the VII universe. In response, Before Crisis, Dirge of Cerberus, and Crisis Core were conceived so as to embrace more aspects of the world and characters. Nomura himself was surprised at the creation of the games, having originally assumed that the film would be the sole product of the project.

=== Development ===
Each title had a different impetus fueling its creation and development: Before Crisis was thought up by Hajime Tabata, a new employee at Square Enix's mobile division, when asked by Nomura to create a video game featuring the Turks. Dirge of Cerberus was inspired by Vincent's choice of weapon, Kitase's love of first-person shooters, and the challenge it would provide developers. Prior to the series solidification and the release of Advent Children and Before Crisis, the team had considered other gun-wielding Final Fantasy protagonists for such a game. Crisis Core originated simply as either a Final Fantasy spin-off or a port of Before Crisis for the PlayStation Portable, and after talks with Kitase and Nomura, it was decided to make it another title in the Compilation. The creation of Before Crisis after Advent Children began a lettering formula for the series later used by the staff as common abbreviations: 'AC' stood for Advent Children, 'BC' for Before Crisis, 'CC' for Crisis Core, and 'DC' for Dirge of Cerberus. The sequence was nearly disrupted when Crisis Core's title was considered as Before Crisis Core, but the "Before" part of the title was soon dropped, coincidentally creating the sequence.

Before Crisis began development in 2002. The Compilation was first unveiled in 2003 with the announcement of Advent Children. None of the titles in the series up to that point were traditional role-playing games like the original. The explanation for this was that traditional RPGs took long production periods and a large staff, which would have made the project stand out a bit too much. One of the other considerations for the team was not to make the titles lightweight as X-2 had been, due to backlash from parts of the fanbase. Conversely, making Final Fantasy X-2 reminded the team that they did not need to stick to completely serious traditional RPGs, enabling the original creation of the Compilation. While Advent Children was the first Compilation title to begin production, it ran into problems during post-production, resulting in the first released title being Before Crisis, despite it being the second title to begin development. Before Crisis was also originally planned for release in North America, but the mobile phones available in North America at the time were not able to handle the game. In addition, the producer Kosei Ito left Square Enix in 2008 and Tabata moved on to other projects, leaving its localization unlikely. Japanese animation studio Madhouse created a commercial to promote Before Crisis. Due to its success and staff feelings that important scenes from VII represented in Advent Children had been needlessly disjointed, the studio was chosen to produce an animated film: this eventually became Last Order. Crisis Core was originally going to be an action game, but became an action RPG, staying within the staff's design strengths while incorporating action elements.

Wada had stated in 2006, while the development and release of Compilation titles was still ongoing, that the Compilation could remain an active franchise until 2017, the twentieth anniversary of Final Fantasy VII's release. After finishing work on Advent Children Complete, the team took a break from the series, although they said that they still had various ideas for future titles. In later interviews relating to Final Fantasy VII, multiple staff members including Nomura revealed that the Compilation was only ever intended to extend to three games and a film, ending with the release of Crisis Core. Their reasoning was that releasing any more would saturate the market.

== Reception ==
Aggregate review scores
Game	Metacritic
Final Fantasy VII: Advent Children	88/100
Dirge of Cerberus: Final Fantasy VII	57/100
Crisis Core: Final Fantasy VII	83/100
Final Fantasy VII Remake	87/100
Final Fantasy VII Rebirth	92/100

Compared to the original VII, which received near-universal critical acclaim and later cult status as a classic game, the entries in the Compilation have often garnered a mixed reception, and the Compilation as a whole has been critiqued by some. In July 2007, Edge magazine wrote that the titles "could be of a high quality, but there is also a perversion of the original". RPG Site's Alex Donaldson, during a review for Crisis Core, said that the Compilation was "too far detached from the lore of Final Fantasy VII". While critiquing Advent Children and Dirge of Cerberus, and faulting Before Crisis's lack of the original game's characters, he felt that Crisis Core was the Compilation's "first classic [Final Fantasy VII] spin-off". RPGFan's Stephen Meyerink said that the Compilation titles prior to Crisis Core had "expanded, extended, and retconned [the story] into what some would call an unrecognizable mess". Alexa Ray Corriea, writing for Polygon, was highly critical, saying that few of the Compilation titles were good, and only served to "cheapen the 1997 [PlayStation] original".

Reviews for Advent Children have been mixed: while critics have praised the presentation, graphics, and fan appeal, all reviews agree that the story's context and delivery were confusing for people new to the series. While western critics were positive about Last Order, the OVA (original video animation) received heavy fan criticism in Japan due to its retconning of key events, which prompted the team to ensure that the event was faithfully recreated in Crisis Core. Before Crisis, due to remaining in Japan, has received limited attention in the west, but previews have been highly positive, with many praising the gameplay and graphics as being impressive for a mobile game. Opinions for Dirge of Cerberus were decidedly mixed. While many praised the story and characters, especially the focus on Vincent's character and development, critics were mixed about the graphics and gameplay. Japanese magazine Famitsu notably gave the game a delayed and highly critical review. Crisis Core was generally praised, with many enjoying the story's intimate presentation of the characters and action-oriented gameplay, despite some criticism for it being aimed at fans of VII. Critics of the Compilation have generally cited Crisis Core as the best title of the series prior to the Remake trilogy.

As of 2024, Final Fantasy VII Rebirth has the highest average Metacritic score at 92/100. Shubhankar Parijat of GamingBolt applauded the combat system introduced in its predecessor Remake and the expanded mechanics introduced in Rebirth. He describes the combat as "exhilarating" and enjoyed the different mechanics and play styles of each character. Will Nelson of PCGamesN described the characters as depicted in Rebirth as "bursting with personality" and praised them for both their banter and their dialogue during more serious story moments. However, he lamented the repetitive nature of the open world and its activities. Meanwhile, Gene Park of The Washington Post complimented the game's world design, describing it as a "remarkably detailed and seamless open world, a true adventure that spans continents and cultures."

=== Sales ===
Many of the titles have received strong sales. Through 2006, Advent Children met with high sales, with 1 million units sold in Japan, 1.3 million in North America, and 100,000 in Europe, making a total of 2.4 million copies sold worldwide. The original version went on to sell four million copies worldwide by 2009. Advent Children Complete also met with strong sales, selling 100,000 copies on its first day of release in Japan. Advent Children Complete was cited as a reason for the increase in sales of the PlayStation 3 console. Before Crisis registered 200,000 users on launch day, making it the best-selling mobile game up until that time, and was accessed 1.6 million times by June 2006. Dirge of Cerberus shipped 392,000 units in its first week, and went on to sell 460,000 units in North America and 270,000 units in Europe. Crisis Core sold 350,000 copies in Japan on its release date, while it sold 301,600 copies in its first month of release in the United States. It went on to sell 2.1 million units worldwide.

Worldwide, Final Fantasy VII Remake shipped and sold over 3.5 million copies within three days. This made it one of the biggest launches for a PlayStation 4 game and the fastest-selling PS4 exclusive in history. By September 2023, the game had shipped and digitally sold over 7 million units worldwide. According to estimates published by market data firm Alinea Analytics in January 2025, Final Fantasy VII Rebirth has sold over 3.5 million copies across both PlayStation and Steam.

=== Legacy ===
The process of thought behind the Compilation would later inspire the creation of Fabula Nova Crystallis Final Fantasy, a subseries of games linked by a common mythos, and would use lessons learned from the Compilation production process. On an individual level, Before Crisis's popularity would inspire the creation of another mobile title within the Fabula Nova Crystallis subseries: originally titled Final Fantasy Agito XIII, it would later change platforms and be renamed Final Fantasy Type-0. The battle sequences in Advent Children also served as inspiration for Motomu Toriyama when creating the battle system for Final Fantasy XIII. Former staff members have blamed the Compilation, in conjunction with other extensions of titles like Final Fantasy X, for undermining the series' market presence and fan trust in the West.
