= Final Fantasy VII: The First Soldier =

2021 video game

- Developers: Ateam Inc.; Square Enix Creative Business Unit I
- Publisher: Square Enix
- Director: Tetsuya Nomura
- Producer: Shoichi Ichikawa
- Artists: Shintaro Takai; Naoki Nakamura
- Writers: Kazushige Nojima; Sachie Hirano
- Composers: Shotaro Shima; Ryo Furukawa
- Engine: Unreal Engine 4
- Platforms: Android, iOS
- Release: November 17, 2021
- Genres: Third person shooter, battle royale
- Mode: Multiplayer

Final Fantasy VII: The First Soldier was a 2021 free-to-play battle royale video game developed by Ateam Inc. and Square Enix Creative Business Unit I, and published by Square Enix. It was released for Android and iOS on November 17, 2021. The First Soldier is a part of the Compilation of Final Fantasy VII, a collection of spin-offs of the 1997 video game Final Fantasy VII. Set eighteen years before the events of Final Fantasy VII, the game takes place in the world of Midgar, where the players took on the role of SOLDIER candidates in a battle-for-survival simulation.

Citing a failure to deliver their intended experience, Square Enix shut down the game's servers in January 2023.

== Gameplay ==
Final Fantasy VII: The First Soldier was a battle royale mobile game that has players take on the role of a SOLDIER candidate. The First Soldier allowed up to 75 players to participate in a match. It combined battle royale style play with elements from the original 1997 game Final Fantasy VII, including rideable chocobos, magic, moogles and materia. Players could customize their characters and utilize eight different battle styles (also referred to as jobs/classes). The eight styles players could use were Trickster, Machinist, Dragoon, Warrior, Sorcerer, Ninja, Monk and Ranger.

== Development ==
Final Fantasy VII: The First Soldier, along with another game Final Fantasy VII: Ever Crisis, was announced in February 2021. Square Enix developed this game as a collaboration with Ateam Entertainment Inc. along with others to contribute to the greater Compilation of Final Fantasy VII. The game was released for iOS and Android app stores on November 17 the same year. The game's music was composed by Shotaro Shima and Ryo Furukawa.

On December 7, 2022, video game designer Yuji Naka was arrested for insider trading in his relations with Square Enix and the game, having purchased 144.7 million yen of shares of ATeam before the game was announced; he had previously done so with Aiming, who worked for Square Enix on Dragon Quest Tact, and was given a suspended prison sentence.

=== Shutdown ===
In Autumn of 2022, Square Enix began operations to close The First Soldier, citing the inability to deliver on their intended experience as the main reason for termination. The game continued operation until January 11, 2023.

== Critical reception ==
Reception

Aggregate score
Aggregator	Score
Metacritic	62/100

Review scores
Publication	Score
GameSpot	7/10
HobbyConsolas	60/100
IGN	6.8/10
Jeuxvideo.com	15/20

The game received "mixed or average" reviews from critics, according to review aggregator website Metacritic. Phil Hornshaw of GameSpot described the game's interface as "my main opponent", with the wide variety of controls and information the screen obscuring the game's screen, especially compared to other battle royale games with mobile counterparts such as Fortnite and PUBG. He felt this was a shame due to feeling the game itself was a compelling take on the genre, with the elements taken from Final Fantasy VII such as materia adding more depth.

== Story Adaptation ==
Elements of the planned narrative for Final Fantasy VII: The First Soldier were eventually written and implemented to Final Fantasy VII: Ever Crisis as part of its adaptation of the overall Compilation of Final Fantasy VII. Narrative elements involve new protagonists (Note: Glenn Lodbrok, Lucia Lin, Matt Winsord, all of whom are seen in promotional video material for The First Soldier.), Sephiroth's first mission, and his first meeting with fellow SOLDIER Angeal Hewley, all of which occur 15 years before the events of Final Fantasy VII.
