= Tifa Lockhart =

Video game character

- Final Fantasy character
- Tifa Lockhart artwork by Tetsuya Nomura in Final Fantasy VII
- First game: Final Fantasy VII (1997)
- Created by: Tetsuya Nomura
- Designed by: Tetsuya Nomura; Dan Suzuki (Remake); Roberto Ferrari (Remake)
- Voiced by: English: Rachael Leigh Cook (2005-2019); Britt Baron (2020-present); Glory Curda (Remake, young); Japanese: Ayumi Ito; Yōko Asada (Ehrgeiz, arcade version); Yūko Minaguchi (Ehrgeiz, home console version); Ayaka Mitsumoto (Remake, young)
- Motion capture: Haruka Shibai (Remake)

In-universe information
- Weapon: Gloves
- Home: Nibelheim

Tifa Lockhart (Japanese: ティファ・ロックハート, Hepburn: Tifa Rokkuhāto) is a character from the 1997 role-playing video game Final Fantasy VII by Square (now Square Enix). She has since appeared as a playable fighter in Ehrgeiz and the Dissidia Final Fantasy series, made cameo appearances in several other titles, such as Kingdom Hearts II and Itadaki Street, and been featured in the Compilation of Final Fantasy VII series, including the animated film Advent Children. She was created as a foil to her teammate Aerith Gainsborough by members of the development team including director Yoshinori Kitase and writers Kazushige Nojima and Tetsuya Nomura; Nomura additionally contributed to her visual design.

Tifa is the childhood friend of Cloud Strife, the protagonist of Final Fantasy VII. She is the owner of the 7th Heaven bar in the slums of Midgar and a member of the eco-terrorist group AVALANCHE. She convinces Cloud to join the group to keep him close and safe, and later assists in saving the Planet from the game's villain, Sephiroth. Titles in the Compilation of Final Fantasy VII later expanded upon her character, such as in Advent Children, where she attempts to convince Cloud to let go of his self-imposed guilt and move on with his life after Sephiroth's defeat.

Tifa has been named the pin-up girl of the "cyber generation" by The New York Times, and has been compared to Lara Croft as an example of a strong, independent, and attractive female character. Critics have repeatedly praised her strength and appearance and described her as one of the best female characters in video games. Her design's sex appeal has received some criticism for overshadowing other aspects of her character.

== Conception and design ==
Although Tifa's attire has varied, a miniskirt has usually been a staple of her design.

Tifa was designed by Tetsuya Nomura. She was not present in early versions of Final Fantasy VII, as the game was to have only three playable characters: the protagonist Cloud Strife, Aerith Gainsborough, and Barret Wallace. However, it was suggested during phone call to project director Yoshinori Kitase that one of the main characters should die at some point in the game. After much discussion as to whether it should be Barret or Aerith, the producers chose Aerith. Nomura later joked that this was his idea, so as to enable him to introduce Tifa into the game. The notion of having two concurrent heroines and having the hero waver between them was something Kitase liked, describing it as something new in the Final Fantasy series. She was designed to use the "monk" character class that appeared in previous games in the series, and many aspects of her personality were taken from Aerith's initial design.

In a change from previous entries in the Final Fantasy series, the development team worked from Nomura's character designs; longtime series artist Yoshitaka Amano created his own versions as background, wanting to depict the characters in futuristic clothing. Tifa's outfit consists of a white crop top and a black miniskirt held up by a pair of narrow black suspenders. She wears red boots and gloves, with black sleeves extending from wrist to elbow; a metal guard covers her left elbow. The attire was described as giving her freedom of movement, due to her hand-to-hand combat specialty. She stands 167 centimetres (5 ft 5 1/2 in) tall. Her hair is long and dark brown in a style that resembles a dolphin's tail. This longer fixed hairstyle helped to differentiate her visually from Aerith and was also easier to animate.

Unlike most other characters for Final Fantasy VII, Nomura wrote down her bust/waist/hip measurements in his concept art for her, defined as 92-60-88 cm (36-24-35 in). Nomura wanted each character to have one striking feature, in Tifa's case her large breasts. During development, the team jokingly referred to her as "Boing-chan", an allusion to her bust. Composer Nobuo Uematsu commented that her breasts were "a bit...overly ample," and cutscene director Motonari Sakakibara rebutted that the rest of the team insisted against reducing their size. Nomura added "at the end of the day we all like them. [...] If I made them smaller, everyone would get angry at me."

Nomura had difficulty deciding whether Tifa should wear a miniskirt or long pants. During development, he passed his sketches around Square's offices to seek input, with the majority of the staff members favoring the miniskirt design. Her miniskirt serves as a contrast to Aerith, whose trademark was her "long skirt", and it was kept in her alternate costumes. The developers noted that due to her figure, her otherwise plain garments took on a pleasant appearance. The development team later clarified that the miniskirt was more akin to a skort instead of bare underwear, to keep her from being exposed during combat.

=== Post–Final Fantasy VII ===
When producing Final Fantasy VII: Advent Children, co-director Takeshi Nozue had difficulty developing a visual framework for Tifa that was "balanced, yet showed off her feminine qualities". Her outfit was redesigned with emphasis on expressing those qualities, while still being pleasing to the eye. Nomura describes her character in Advent Children as having several dimensions, calling her "like a mother, a sweetheart and a close ally in battle" and "remarkably strong, not only emotionally, but physically as well". In the film, she wears a white tank top with a black zipped up vest, a pink ribbon around her left bicep, and boots. She also wears a black buttoned-up skirt that covers her thighs and wears shorts beneath it, with a piece of cloth similar to a coattail extending from the back of the skirt's waistband and ending at her ankles. She no longer uses suspenders to hold up her skirt and she wears her gloves during the film's fight scenes. Her hairstyle was changed to end at the middle of her back, with the removal of the dolphin tail from her original design. This alteration was due to the difficulty of animating her original length of hair, as well as visibility problems that arose from its black color and the lighting.

For the Final Fantasy VII Remake series, the development team worked heavily with Nomura to refine her design, working with artist Roberto Ferrari and character modeler Dan Suzuki. Details like charms were added around her wrists, and roughly twenty hair colors were considered before settling on ashen brown. The development team wanted to avoid favoring either Tifa or Aerith so they deliberately tried to give them equal screen time, as they wanted both to be positioned as heroines, and emphasized Eastern aesthetics and the cuteness of her face to contrast with Aerith's Western aesthetics. They additionally wanted to emphasize her athletic physique, so they gave her visibly defined abdominal muscles. Square Enix's ethics department requested changes to her clothing, giving her black undergarments and a form-fitting tank top to "constrict" her chest so it would not "come off as unnatural during heavy action sequences". Suzuki considered the innerwear an improvement to her design. Some media outlets however misinterpreted the information and claimed her bust size had been reduced; the development team later illustrated that when creating her character model, a padded Japanese G70 cup size (95 cm) bra was used on a real-life model to portray it accurately.

Ferrari created the multiple alternate outfits included in Remake for Tifa, aiming for designs that would be easier on the animation team but would also pay homage to outfits she had in the original game. Various ideas were considered during development, including a maid costume and a bikini modelled after a chocobo, one of the Final Fantasy series' mascots. They ultimately settled on a black cheongsam with her hair worn in pigtail buns, as well as a black kimono, both of which are worn with stockings. Ferrari commented that the latter was particularly difficult to create, as several of his design submissions were rejected during the process. In Final Fantasy VII Rebirth, two beachside outfits were added for her: a blue tied-up shirt and short shorts with her hair in a bun adorned with a flower, and a white- and blue-frilled bikini with a similar hairstyle.

=== Casting ===
Nomura noted that he liked Ayumi Ito as an actress and wished to work with her on Advent Children. With Aerith's voice actor already decided, Nomura asked Ito to voice Tifa, feeling her "husky voice" would offer a good contrast to Maaya Sakamoto's Aerith. Although Tifa's updated design had already been finalized, Ito's casting motivated them to blend many traits from the voice actress into the character's appearance. Cloud's voice actor Takahiro Sakurai said that while he recorded most of his work individually, he performed alongside Ito for a few scenes. These recordings left him feeling "deflated", as the "exchanges he has with Tifa [could] be pretty painful". Ayaka Mitsumoto voiced Tifa in the flashback from Remake where a teenage Tifa interacts with Cloud. Whereas young Cloud's casting was a challenge, they found an actress to match Ito's voice quite quickly.

Rachael Leigh Cook, Tifa's English voice actor in Kingdom Hearts II, stated that she enjoyed playing Tifa and described her as "very strong physically and emotionally, [but also] very sensitive" and "really multi-dimensional". In voicing the character, Cook listened to Ito's recording as a guide to how the character sounds. Following Advent Children, Cook thanked Nomura for the film he created as she enjoyed it. Britt Baron voiced Tifa in Final Fantasy VII Remake and Final Fantasy VII Rebirth, and Tifa as a child is voiced by Glory Curda.

== Appearances ==
=== Final Fantasy VII ===
Tifa is introduced in Final Fantasy VII as the childhood friend of Cloud Strife and owner of the 7th Heaven bar in the slums of Midgar, a technologically advanced metropolis owned by the Shinra Electric Power Company. She is also a member of the eco-terrorist organization AVALANCHE, who opposes Shinra's extraction and use of Mako, the planet's spiritual energy, as a power source. When they reunite in Midgar, she convinces Cloud to join the group and follows him in pursuit of the game's antagonist, Sephiroth. While she is unable to keep him from being manipulated by Sephiroth, she helps him recover after his mind becomes fractured and they realize their mutual feelings for one another, working together to defeat Sephiroth.

When they were children, Tifa and Cloud followed a path up the mountain near their hometown of Nibelheim. However, they were both injured and Tifa fell into a coma for a week, with her father holding Cloud responsible for the incident. Cloud eventually left to join Shinra's SOLDIER program to become stronger, but it is later revealed that he did it primarily to attract her attention. In response, she requested if she were ever in danger, he would return to save her. Years later, during Sephiroth's rampage in Nibelheim, Cloud rescued Tifa after she was wounded by Sephiroth. Tifa was taken to safety by her martial arts instructor and eventually arrived in Midgar, meeting AVALANCHE's leader, Barret Wallace. She joined AVALANCHE to get revenge for the destruction of her home. Shortly before the beginning of Final Fantasy VII, she encountered an incoherent Cloud at the city's train station and convinced him to work for Barret, to keep him close and watch over him.

Her character changed significantly during development, with an early relationship chart depicting her as Sephiroth's sibling. In preliminary drafts of Final Fantasy VII, Tifa was a background character with a particular fondness for Cloud whose role in AVALANCHE was to provide support behind the scenes and to cheer everyone up after missions. She was supposed to have a large scar on her back caused by Cloud and partial amnesia from the incident when she had received it. Masato Kato, one of the event planners, proposed a scene in which she and Cloud had sex but it was replaced with a toned-down version by Kitase wherein a suggestive line is followed by a fade to black. In an interview, Nojima stated that none of the staff thought the scene would become an issue at the time. When developing the international edition of Final Fantasy VII, an additional cutscene was added to showcase an enemy in the game, Ultima Weapon, and featured Tifa in it due to how popular her character had become.

=== Compilation of Final Fantasy VII ===
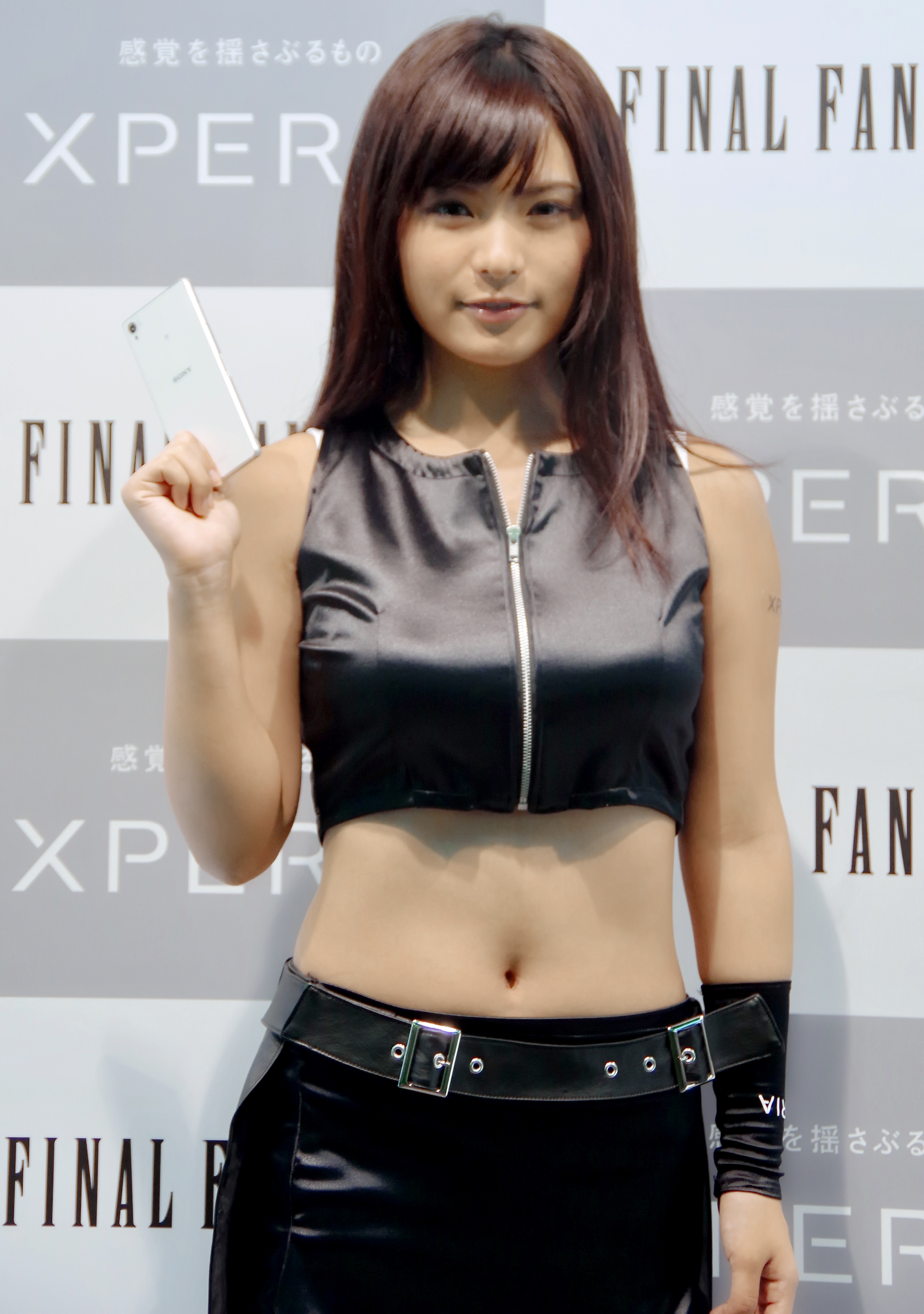
The Advent Children version of Tifa, as portrayed by gravure idol Mizuki Hoshina promoting Sony Xperia at TGS 2014

Tifa appears in the 2005 film Final Fantasy VII: Advent Children, which is set two years after the events of the game. She tries to give emotional support to Cloud, urging him to come to terms with the unwarranted guilt he places upon himself. She also takes care of Barret's adopted daughter Marlene and an orphan, Denzel. During the film, she duels against Loz and battles the summoned creature Bahamut SIN alongside the team. Script writer Kazushige Nojima described her role in the film as "very much like any woman who's been left behind by a man", stating that while they did not want her to appear clingy, they wanted to portray that she was emotionally hurt by Cloud's departure. In the film's initial draft as a short film, she was intended to have a more central role, which only included herself, Cloud and several children, with the story revolving around a note being delivered to him.

Tifa is featured in the prequel games Before Crisis and Crisis Core, as well as the original video animation Last Order, which each provide different perspectives on the destruction of Nibelheim. The novella "Case of Tifa", written as part of the On the Way to a Smile series, is a story set between the original game and Advent Children that is told from her point of view. The story details how she creates a new 7th Heaven bar in the city of Edge and attempts to hold onto the concept of a normal family with herself and Cloud, despite him beginning to isolate himself from others. Tifa also appears in the game Dirge of Cerberus, which is set one year after the events of Advent Children, in which she helps the protagonist Vincent Valentine defend the planet against the monster Omega WEAPON; in the game's epilogue, she discusses Vincent's disappearance.

Tifa is a prominent playable character in Final Fantasy VII Remake and its sequel, Final Fantasy VII Rebirth. By focusing solely on the Midgar portion of the original game in Remake, the development team was able to include additional scenes that developed the relationship between Tifa and Aerith. Traces of Two Pasts, a tie-in novel to the remake, depicts the childhoods of Tifa and Aerith. Tifa's section details her upbringing in Nibelheim, her meeting and tutelage under her martial arts master, and her life in the slums of Midgar following her near-death experience during the Nibelheim incident.

=== Other appearances ===
Outside of the Compilation of Final Fantasy VII, Tifa is an unlockable character and optional boss in the fighting game Ehrgeiz. She is a playable character in the party video game Itadaki Street. In Kingdom Hearts II, she appears in her Advent Children attire, searching for Cloud and later fighting various Heartless. She was originally planned to appear in the Final Mix version of the original Kingdom Hearts, but due to time constraints the staff members chose to incorporate Sephiroth instead. Whereas in the game, Cloud goes missing after a battle with Sephiroth, in the manga adaptation, Tifa finds him in Hollow Bastion. In 2015, she was added to the mobile game Final Fantasy Record Keeper as a playable character.

Tifa is one of the playable characters in the fighting game Dissidia 012 Final Fantasy, which features characters from various Final Fantasy games. She initially wears her original outfit, but the player has access to her Advent Children outfit and a third outfit based on her appearance in the Nibelheim flashback. The first print run of the game features another form based on artwork by Yoshitaka Amano. In LittleBigPlanet 2, Tifa appears as a downloadable character model, and as a Mii costume and Spirit in Super Smash Bros. Ultimate. Tifa is set to appear as a playable character in Street Fighter 6 as part of the game's fourth season pass.

== Critical reception ==
Since her introduction critics and fans reacted positively to Tifa, often appearing near the top of fan polls. The New York Times named her as the pin-up girl of the "cyber generation", while The Beaumont Enterprise cited Tifa as an example of a strong female character in video games in the mold of Lara Croft from the Tomb Raider series. Holly Boson of Polygon described Tifa as defined by her "brittle confidence and supportiveness", further stating her belief that in the context of Final Fantasy VII, she represents forcefulness and sexuality. Den of Geek's Matthew Byrd attributed her popularity to her warmth, strength, and the ability to act both supportive and as a leader depending on the situation, but also noted her vulnerability and how it made her a well-rounded character "who is more than worthy of her fan-favorite status". Jenni Lada of Siliconera called her an iconic heroine and praised how Remake built upon her character.

Tifa is often contrasted with Aerith, the other female protagonist of Final Fantasy VII. Gus Turner of Complex described her as a feminine foil to the more "girlish" Aerith and emphasized her agency and empowerment. Leigh Alexander argued that Tifa is the true heroine of the story, present since the beginning and indispensable in the course of events, calling her "a partner for a grown-up player" and wondered how many players did not properly appreciate her on their first playthrough of the game. Fans of the series have heavily debated which character was a better match for Cloud since the initial game's release, comparing the pros and cons of each. Boson observed that supporters of each side often misrepresented the other's chosen heroine. She concluded that there was no winning couple as, after killing Sephiroth, Cloud has a vision of Aerith when Tifa tries to help him and the two agree to meet her again in the afterlife.

RPGamer editor Marie Freed found that when examining Tifa as a character, she came to appreciate her more than Aerith in the years since the original release. She posited that Aerith represented more of an ideal than a character. Tifa was portrayed as someone who was "insecure, lonely, and hides her true emotions", which may have led to her being received negatively, but in Freed's eyes made her the more human of the pair. Freed found her insecurity over her appearance reasonable and relatable, both within the fiction and as an imposition by critics and fans. She also welcomed the contrast to the "destined" romance seen in Final Fantasy IV, finding it a more realistic relationship that persevered through trauma. Freed closed by noting that while people had aspects of both characters in them, Tifa ultimately represented "reality" over the "ideal".

On the other hand, Patrick Holleman in his book Reverse Design: Final Fantasy VII described Tifa as having "the most typical story of a near-death experience and the loss of a world she belonged to" of the game's cast, despite how atypical Cloud was by comparison. Cloud represented her only living connection to her past and, to this end, Holleman believed she ignored the discrepancies in how he remembered events bordering on psychosis not as a matter of romance but as a means to hold onto what she lost. He viewed her desire for Cloud as selfish and ultimately did her more harm than good. However, he also praised a particular moment for her character later in the game when she confronts Scarlet, a secondary antagonist. The scene initially appears to lead into a boss battle against Scarlet, but Tifa instead engages in a slap fight with her, something he felt subverted the player's expectations well.

=== As a sex symbol ===
A significant part of Tifa's reception has focused on her sex appeal, with some unlicensed merchandise leaning heavily into this aspect. Electronic Gaming Monthly awarded her the "Hottest Game Babe" of 1997, calling her "as well-proportioned as they come", but also noted her physical and emotional strength as a character. UGO.com shared similar sentiments, complimenting her outfit and describing her as a "bona-fide sex symbol", highlighting that she was a rarity among female characters in video games at the time. IGN's Phil Pirrello attributed a large part of her popularity to her chest size, noting that she was an example of how the series tried to add real sex appeal with Final Fantasy VII. While her model in the original game was primitive by modern standards, he suggested it had a significant impact on the teenage demographic. Fellow contributor Dave Smith suggested similar, stating it was hard to sing her praises "without sounding just a little teeny-weeny bit sexist", but added that she helped define "tough, independent" role-playing game heroines that came after her.

The character has been a frequent subject of fan-made pornography, cited in particular as a frequent search topic on Pornhub. A study of such content on Rule 34 websites such as Rule34.xxx and Sankaku Channel cited her as the most frequent subject of such content by a wide margin across multiple franchises. In January 2022, a Zoom video conference meeting in the Italian Senate was interrupted by a user displaying 3D-rendered pornography featuring Tifa engaging in sexual intercourse. The user was quickly removed, but due to the conference being televised, knowledge of the event went viral. Although the choice to use Tifa was incidental, it led to a surge in the character's popularity. Jade King of TheGamer noted however that while much of the reaction revolved around fan art of a sexual nature, it also resulted in a large amount of what they considered "wholesome" art celebrating the character and the humor of the situation, usually portraying her in an awkward or comedic manner in association with the event or the country itself. King credited the response to the enduring nature of the character, compounded by Remake's recent release, calling it an "aspect of Tifa's character that will now be ingrained into her history".

Other articles observed that the emphasis on her sex appeal sometimes overshadowed her other aspects. In another article for IGN, the staff acknowledged that while her design was meant to emphasize physical beauty, her "awe-inspiring strength, complex background, strong will and her attachment to Cloud" defined her as more than "just an eye-catching woman", naming her a legendary heroine in the series. The book The Legend of Final Fantasy VII noted that while Tifa has many attributes of a seductive woman, exemplified by her large breasts, she "thwarts the stereotypes associated with her appearance" due to being an independent and strong character, identifying her as the most "leveled headed" and pragmatic character in the game's cast. Philip Bloom of RPGamer felt that while fans and critics alike both overemphasized her beauty, to the point she set a perceived standard for other attractive female role-playing game protagonists, she was not "that absurd of figure" and such commentary often overlooked her strengths as a result.
