= Final Fantasy VII: Ever Crisis =

- Developers: Applibot; Square Enix Creative Business Unit I
- Publisher: Square Enix
- Directors: Motomu Toriyama; Tetsuya Nomura
- Producer: Shoichi Ichikawa
- Designers: Yuji Abe; Nobuyuki Matsuoka
- Artists: Shintaro Takai; Lisa Fujise; Toshiaki Watanabe
- Writers: Kazushige Nojima; Sachie Hirano
- Series: Compilation of Final Fantasy VII; Final Fantasy
- Engine: Unity
- Platforms: Android; iOS; Windows
- Release: Android, iOS; September 7, 2023; Windows; December 7, 2023
- Genres: Role-playing, Gacha game
- Modes: Single-player, multiplayer

Final Fantasy VII: Ever Crisis (Note: Japanese: ファイナルファンタジーVII エバークライシス, Hepburn: Fainaru Fantajī Sebun: Ebā Kuraishisu) was a role-playing video game developed by Applibot and Square Enix, who also publishes it for Android, iOS and Windows. It forms part of the Compilation of Final Fantasy VII, a series of media spin-offs of the 1997 video game Final Fantasy VII.

It is a mobile gacha game that reimagines the timeline of Final Fantasy VII and the Compilation. It launched on September 7, 2023 for Android and iOS, followed by Windows via Steam on December 7 of the same year. Service for the game ended on October 6, 2026.

== Content ==
Final Fantasy VII: Ever Crisis is a mobile game. Planned to be released in monthly episodic installments, the game retells events from the 1997 video game Final Fantasy VII, and all canon titles in the Compilation of Final Fantasy VII media franchise, including the film Advent Children and the video games Before Crisis, Crisis Core and Dirge of Cerberus. The game also features an original storyline set 15 years before Final Fantasy VII, focusing on Sephiroth's past and three new characters, Glenn, Matt, and Lucia. The game borrows several presentational elements from the Final Fantasy VII Remake series. Chapters can be freely selected from a timeline, allowing players to jump between different entries in the series. The battle system draws from the original game's Active Time Battle system. Character voices are only available in Japanese. The title is free to play, but offers loot boxes that include random selections of weapons and costumes.

== Plot ==
=== Final Fantasy VII: The First Soldier ===
For The First Soldier storyline adaptation, since the source game had no story mode content, two original story seasons and one time-limited story event were exclusively developed and released for Ever Crisis, focusing on the past of Sephiroth, 15 years before the events of Final Fantasy VII.

==== Final Fantasy VII: The First Soldier (Episode I) ====
In 1992, three Shinra SOLDIER Class P0's (Note: "Passive" model (P0-Model) SOLDIERS whose strength comes exclusively from training) - Glenn Lodbrok, Lucia Lin, and Matt Winsord - are sent to the Rhadore Archipelago to conduct a survey of regional mako levels and determine future potential mako reactor sites. After being shot down by enemy Rhadoran forces, the three meet Rosen, a youth whose role as the "Eye of Rhadore" is a lifelong duty that involves him living alone on his island to keep watch and warn his people of the risk of natural disasters known as mana torrents. (Note: The Rhadoran people refer to mako energy as "mana".) Feeling sympathetic towards the loneliness of this role, Glenn and his team grow to care for Rosen's well-being before being sent to the main Rhadoran island.

After finding a suitable site for mako reactor construction, the three are once again attacked by Rhadoran forces, but are rescued by a teenage SOLDIER named Sephiroth, (Note: Sephiroth is the first "Active" type SOLDIER, whose strength comes from genetic experiments/enhancements as well as training.) who assumes control of the mission. After initial infighting, Sephiroth confides in Glenn's team about wanting to live a normal life rather than be a hero, and that the assignment was his first field mission. Later, Sephiroth shares a photograph of his mother - Lucrecia Crescent (who he only knows to be named Jenova).

Pushing on, the team finds a cavernous Rhadoran stronghold and eradicates the forces within. After splitting up and reuniting, Glenn, Lucia, and Matt witness Sephiroth killing the Rhadoran children and elderly, stating that his training taught him that it is "kill or be killed". Glenn sympathizes with Sephiroth's hardened experiences and tells him that he does not need to prove his strength to them, and that he is capable of compassion.

10 days later, while Shinra engineers prepare the site for reactor construction, the team worries for Rosen - alone on his island, unaware that his people were killed. Meanwhile, after unsuccessfully helping Sephiroth search for his mother's photograph - lost during the earlier Rhadoran conflicts - Glenn and his team experience tremors across the island, caused by Shinra explosives placed for site preparation. The explosions cause a disastrous chain reaction and trigger a mana torrent, destroying the main island.

Worrying for Rosen, Glenn, Lucia, and Matt decide to abandon their mission and attempt to rescue him, with Sephiroth joining them and proceeding ahead despite Glenn's warnings. As they witness the destruction caused by Shinra, Glenn, Lucia, and Matt have a change of heart in their role and decide to cut ties with the company once they return. Catching up to Rosen, Glenn confesses his role in killing the Rhadorans, and a grief-stricken Rosen flees back to his post. Sephiroth catches up to them, and Glenn's team watch in shock from a distance as he kills Rosen. After fighting off a giant creature summoned by the planet, Glenn expresses his surprise and betrayal at Sephiroth's actions; then, seeing the photograph of Sephiroth's mother nearby, Glenn kicks it into a nearby chasm in anger. The four of them leave as the Rhadore Archipelago is completely engulfed by the mana torrent.

Eight years later, in Wutai during the Shinra-Wutai war, (Note: Shortly after the disappearance of SOLDIER Genesis Rhapsodos, during the events of Crisis Core: Final Fantasy VII) Sephiroth reunites with Glenn, who is no longer affiliated with Shinra. After a skirmish, Glenn apologizes for his outburst years ago while providing intel on an upcoming aerial assault on a nearby fort, giving Sephiroth an opportunity to heroically save many lives. After fighting off several creatures, Wutai forces, and a massive behemoth, Sephiroth is hailed by fellow Shinra forces as a true hero to his people. He then suddenly flashes back to his confrontation with Rosen years ago, during which he recalls Rosen refusing to be saved, pleading for Sephiroth to kill him as a means of choosing who to save from the mana torrent: him or Glenn's team. Glenn helplessly watched as Sephiroth made his choice.

Some time later, in an unknown space, (Note: Referred to as the "edge of creation" in Final Fantasy VII Remake) Sephiroth somberly reflects on the events of his past.

==== Final Fantasy VII: The First Soldier (Episode II) ====
Several months after the failed Rhadore operation, in September of 1992, Sephiroth and SOLDIER Second Class Angeal Hewley are dispatched to the Igara Forbidden Zone, and the village of Robio within, on the southern tip of the Wutai region. They are joined by Shinra journalist Russ Bachman, who films the mission as a way to promote Shinra propaganda via Sephiroth's poster heroics. As they proceed, Angeal tasks the team with rescuing members of a previous SOLDIER unit, three of whom are soon discovered dead. The last team member, Active-type SOLDIER Alissa Goldie, is found alive, but injured. Upon encountering her, Sephiroth notices her resemblance to his mother, and acts both hesitant and protective towards her.

As the four continue to investigate, tensions arise between Sephiroth and Angeal; the former being standoffish and prioritizing the mission, the latter focusing on the safety of the group and looking for opportunities to bond. Further into the region, they are stalked and repeatedly attacked by a demonic swordsmith named Masamune, the namesake of his prized blade. Upon their encounter, Sephiroth begins to single-mindedly covet the weapon, to Angeal's dismay.

Alissa explains that the Igara Forbidden Zone was named by the Ancients for two key destructive events. The first event occurred over 1000 years earlier, and involved a rampaging entity that took five great heroes - led by Da Chao - to defeat it using fire magic that uncontrollably grew until it caused a forced evacuation. The fires raged for three years, killing many, while the surviving population founded a nation to the north of the continent, Wutai. The second incident concerned an attempt to repopulate the area about 500 years later, in the newly settled village of Robio. At the time, the local swordsmith, Masamune, felt an urge to produce a weapon of extraordinary power. Upon its completion, the local settlers began to covet the blade and fought one another for possession of it, before the population was wiped out by Masamune's power and madness and the village was razed to the ground. The truth of the events were covered up and kept hidden, with Masamune surviving for centuries after seals were placed around the area to prevent his escape. Angeal's team witness flashes of the latter incident via spiritual motes of light around the land, which Alissa states as the reason she has this knowledge.

As the group rests, Bachman periodically recounts the journey up that point, while Sephiroth seemingly has dreams of wishful interactions with his mother (Note: Sephiroth sees the form of Lucrecia Crescent, but refers to her as Jenova, as per Hojo's misleading.), and Angeal has recollections of his time at his hometown - particularly his parents.

Journeying further, they come across a cavernous stone temple, where Bachman starts to experience the knowledge fed to him by the light motes, with him and Alissa deducing them to be spiritual manifestations from the land itself. They find statues - placed by the five Ancient heroes - each with a seal, collectively containing the power of the Masamune blade. Sephiroth and the group perceive this series of challenges as a set of trials to determine his worthiness to wield the Masamune. Alissa and Bachman grow to accept the spiritual influence and encourage Sephiroth in his pursuit for the weapon, while Angeal grows more skeptical and rejecting, leading to further tensions between him and Sephiroth. After opening the seals, the group uncover a passageway leading to a chamber where Masamune's demonic spirit challenges Sephiroth for a final time. Sephiroth defeats him and attempts to claim the blade, only for it to fade away, suggesting further trials ahead of him.

As they rest, Angeal comes to realize that his recent memories are falsely modified representations of his past, sometimes presenting him with scenarios he would idealize, and others that singularly shame him. In his determination, he notes the inconsistency between these manifestations against what he knows of his family, and is able to wake himself up from the delusional states the spirits place him in.

The group hears the voice of Glenn Lodbrok calling out to Sephiroth, apologizing to him for throwing the bracelet and claiming to be searching for Rosen. This shakes Sephiroth, leading him to reveal the truth behind the previous Rhadoran operation's failure, his deep attachment to Glenn and his team, and his killing of Rosen. Sephiroth also begins to have further recollections of his time on Rhadore (Note: During the 10 days before the excavation explosions set off the mana torrent.), during which Glenn's team note Sephiroth's similarity to Rosen and anticipate their meeting. Further recollections reveal that the reason he desires the Masamune blade was to honor a desire of Glenn's: that Sephiroth obtain a weapon truly worthy of the hero he is meant to be. Confiding these points to others causes Sephiroth to become more open to making new connections.

As the trials continue, the surrounding land transforms into illusory representations of Igara prior to its destruction, causing Sephiroth to recall a final memory of Glenn's team. After the Rhadore operation, Sephiroth was commended for his actions; as the group celebrated, Matt shared a photograph of the Igaran landscape and his hopes of taking on a mission in the region. Shortly after, Glenn, Matt, and Lucia were called in to face a tribunal for their insubordination and operational failure, with Refu - Rosen's dog - left in Sephiroth's care. After a week of refusing to eat, Refu disappeared and Sephiroth overheard talk of Glenn and his team leaving Shinra and leaving him behind, further adding to his trauma from the incident. He vowed to fight off personal connections and use it to further his own prowess. In the present, Alissa advises Sephiroth to not ignore the past, as his experiences and connections, both past and present, make him who he is, which Angeal agrees with.

Sephiroth, Angeal, and the others come across a chamber, where apparitions of Matt and Lucia are held in the grip of a monstrous creature and Sephiroth is told to choose who to save. After doing so, the saved apparition transforms into the creature and attacks him and Angeal. Defeating it, they proceed to the next trial, with a similar choice - this time between Glenn or Rosen. After choosing and facing off the creature once again, the spirits commend Sephiroth's abilities and deem him ready to obtain the sword, which would help "free him from the burdens of making choices".

The more the group rests, the more Sephiroth and Angeal are confronted by dream-like encounters. Sephiroth faces his guilt for Rosen's death and resolves to protect his imagined mother from the world, while Angeal comes to accept his faults in the hometown hardships he caused as a result of him leaving to become a SOLDIER, including his father's debt and eventual death; using his father's words of inspiration to further strengthen his own resolve and determination, he once again breaks free of the spirits' illusions.

Returning to Masamune's trial chamber, Sephiroth finally claims the Masamune as his own. He displays its unique powers fueled by the spirits, as it can grow in length and materialize in and out of existence rather than needing a scabbard.

As they leave, the group are shown a final series of illusory environments, showing Igaran celebrations congratulating Sephiroth for his accomplishment and heroics and encouraged by Bachman and Alissa, much to Angeal's frustrations.

Once the illusions end, the four leave the stone temple, but Alissa and Angeal are captured by the monstrous creature as a final "true" trial for Sephiroth to make his choice. Unwilling to be denied a say in his fate, Angeal breaks free on his own. Alissa is then corrupted and transformed into a monstrous version of herself (Note: Referred to in-game as "Revenant Mother Alissa".), and attacks them. Sephiroth hesitates as the Masamune moves on its own, seemingly possessing its own spiritual will, which he understands to explain the meaning behind the sword "freeing him from the burdens of making choices". Sephiroth hesitates, but is saved by Angeal. Witnessing Angeal's strength of will and his words of inspiration, Sephiroth finally shows affinity toward him and overcomes the sword's will with his own, as they fight and kill the transformed Alissa.

As they wait for rescue, Sephiroth warns Bachman - and entrusts Angeal - to not reveal the Masamune's true spiritual nature to anyone. On the way back to Midgar, Sephiroth and Angeal finally bond, and Bachman shares with them the footage of Alissa to remember her by. Sephiroth is shocked to see the footage revealing her face to look completely different, and that he was previously seeing an illusory form of his mother in her place. He chooses not to share what he saw.

Some time later, Bachman (Note: now turned into a "robed individual", presumably from future experimentation by Hojo.) returns to Igara, and theorizes that what they presumed were spirits in the land were in fact manifestations of Jenova's will. (Note: Suggesting Jenova's manipulation of the Masamune blade and its namesake swordsmith, and her influence over the group's minds via the illusions and dreams they experienced.)

==== The Three Ex-SOLDIERs ====
After leaving the Shinra company in 1992 (Note: as depicted in The First Soldier (Episode II)), Glenn, Matt, and Lucia establish an independent self-sustained community, free from its oversight.

Three years later (Note: In the year 1995), Rufus Shinra approaches them with offers to finance them in exchange for their allegiance towards overthrowing President Shinra, which they refuse. Shortly after, their town burns down, seemingly due to a Shinra-backed traitor.

A year later (Note: in the year 1996), Glenn and his team found a resistance movement, the SRC - the "Shinra Resistance Committee", after which they are once again approached by Rufus. Due to the Shinra company's inescapable presence, Rufus is greeted with less hostility and, because of Glenn's reluctance, proposes a joint operation - along with unlimited access to intel and finances provided - to ease his concern. During the operation, the three notice Sephiroth defending the target position, which they overhear was under sudden orders from Rufus. Glenn's team deduces that this development, as well as their community burning down, were orchestrated by Rufus as separate warnings to keep them in control. Understanding and accepting his lack of choice in the matter and Rufus' honest desire in wanting his father's death, Glenn finally agrees to join forces with Rufus, who directs them to ally with Wutai and galvanize their support to rise and defeat Shinra.

Three years into their involvement in the Shinra-Wutai war (Note: in the year 1999), Glenn and his team conduct operations against Shinra as they gain support from the Wutaians. Setting up SRC headquarters in Wutai, they meet with Rufus to discuss their plan to make Wutai more dependent on the SRC instead of the Wusheng - Wutai's leadership; which would be followed by their announcement of "Viceroy Sarruf" (Note: Sarruf is an anagram/wordplay of Rufus' concealed identity; eg: "ru-fa-su" becomes "sa-ru-fu") as their unseen leading representative and nonexistent figurehead of inspiration. Rufus reiterates his goal towards creating a world free of Shinra. Soon, a major joint Wutai-SRC frontline operation succeeds in repelling Shinra forces from Wutai territory; afterwards, Glenn's team and the SRC assume leadership of the territory.

The next year (Note: in the year 2000; the final year of the Shinra-Wutai war), the conflict enters a stalemate, with Wutaian resources dwindling and the Wusheng remaining nonparticipant. At the same time, Shinra is dealing with a sudden mass disappearance of SOLDIER operatives (Note: as depicted at the start of Crisis Core: Final Fantasy VII). As Sephiroth is sent to Wutai to further investigate these disappearances, he is reunited with Glenn (Note: as depicted in The First Soldier (Episode I)). During this time, a major Shinra operation turns the conflict in their favor over Wutai, ultimately leading to Wutai's defeat. As per Rufus' plan, the SRC would use the chaos to establish a provisional government in Wutai under Viceroy Sarruf's leadership.

In the year 0007 (Note: the in-universe calendar switches from 2000 over to 0001 following the end of Shinra-Wutai war) (Note: during the events of Final Fantasy VII), the SRC continue to gain anti-Shinra support around the world. Rufus, posing as an SRC negotiator, bargains with President Shinra for their support in expanding the company's influence. He provides intel and leaks details of an SRC operation to destroy an arms factory on an island in the Junon region. Shinra forces intercept Glenn's team, leading to the operation's overall failure. Nonetheless, Rufus' communications implied enough for Glenn and his teams to survive the ambush, as they realize the intent to fake the SRC's total defeat.

As they attempt to evacuate, they are attacked by a rampaging behemoth and defeat it, but its frenzy initiates a quake which causes the island to sink. This reminds them of the failed Rhadore incident, and they commiserate over Sephiroth's assumed death (Note: occurred during the Nibelheim incident 5 years earlier, in the year 0002), hoping to one day reunite with him in the lifestream. Two evacuation choppers arrive to rescue the team; Matt and Lucia take the first, while Glenn takes the second and finds Rufus waiting within.

While they initially plan to prepare a meeting between Glenn-as-"Sarruf" and President Shinra - as part of the latter's recent stipulations - they are interrupted by the sudden news of the president's death. Landing near Midgar's outskirts, Glenn congratulates Rufus for his success. However, Rufus instead proposes to keep Shinra in power until they can eventually convince the people to follow him towards a new world order. After noticing Glenn's hesitation, Rufus fatally shoots him in the back.

Within the lifestream, Glenn regrets being unable to save anyone; however, after an unseen, familiar voice playfully encourages him not to give up, he expresses renewed resolve to continue fighting as a hero.

=== Character Stories ===
In addition to major narrative storylines, five short character stories give insight into the journeys of their respective characters prior to the events of Final Fantasy VII.

==== Cloud - Memories Anew ====
Cloud's arrival in Midgar shortly after Zack's death, his reunion with Tifa, his memories actively changing due to Jenova's influence, and his acceptance of a job in bombing a Mako Reactor.

==== Barret - A Dad's Struggles ====
Barret's journey from Corel, following the Corel Mako Reactor explosion, his newfound belief in Planetology, and his motivation to protect Marlene by joining with Avalanche against Shinra. (Note: This story is an adaptation of an excerpt from Final Fantasy VII: On the Way to a Smile.)

==== Tifa - A Fated Encounter ====
Tifa's recovery after the Nibelheim incident, her arrival in Midgar, her friendship with Jessie, Biggs and Wedge, and her joining-up with Avalanche. (Note: This story is an adaptation of an excerpt from Final Fantasy VII Remake: Traces of Two Pasts.)

==== Aerith - A Dream Picnic ====
A story of Aerith's attempts to have a picnic, including memories of her childhood in the Shinra building and her connection with her mother, and her being watched over by Tseng.

==== Zack - My Hero ====
Zack's early days in SOLDIER, his rapport with Kunsel, and his first meeting with Angeal Hewley, who inspires Zack to dream to become a hero.

== Development ==
Ever Crisis forms part of the Compilation of Final Fantasy VII, a collection of media which expands the universe and narrative of Final Fantasy VII. Ever Crisis is developed by Applibot and Square Enix, who also publish it.

Its staff features Shoichi Ichikawa as producer, Kazushige Nojima as story and scenario writer, Yoshinori Kitase as executive producer, Tetsuya Nomura as creative director, Motomu Toriyama as director, Shintaro Takai as graphics and vfx director, Lisa Fujise as character illustrator, Yuji Abe as game design director, Sachie Hirano as lead scenario writer, Toshiaki Watanabe as lead character artist, and Nobuyuki Matsuoka as battle designer.

The Compilation originally only included four official titles, concluding with Crisis Core in 2007. Beginning with the 2020 remake, Kitase revived the Compilation and put multiple spin-off projects into production, including Ever Crisis.

Nomura described Ever Crisis as an alternate remake of Final Fantasy VII. In addition to remaking the original storylines, original scenario writer Kazushige Nojima incorporated new material including the backstory of Final Fantasy VII: The First Soldier and stories from the childhoods of various Final Fantasy VII characters.

The graphics were described by Square Enix as a "nostalgic visual twist" on the super-deformed or "chibi" graphical style of Final Fantasy VII. Nomura originally wanted the character portraits to be 3D rendered moving portraits, but technical constraints forced the team to use 2D artwork. These portraits and other character artwork were created by Lisa Fujise. Voice acting was under consideration, with the mobile platform's technical limitations needing to be taken into account. Nomura also noted that the games vary widely in technology, style, and mechanics, and this title allows the games to be presented in a unified package. The music also features new arrangements. It marks the Western debut of Before Crisis, which was previously exclusive to Japan.

Ever Crisis was first hinted at in January 2021 with trademark registrations of the title in Japan, North America, Europe and Australia. The title followed naming conventions for the Compilation. The game was later unveiled in February alongside the PlayStation 5 version of Final Fantasy VII Remake, known as Final Fantasy VII Remake Intergrade, and the battle royale mobile spin-off title Final Fantasy VII: The First Soldier. It was planned for worldwide release, excluding mainland China & SEA, starting with a closed beta version in 2022, but was later delayed to summer 2023. A closed beta test ran from July 6 to 13. Ever Crisis was released on September 7, 2023, followed by a Windows release on December 7 of the same year.

On July 7, 2026, Square Enix announced that Ever Crisis will shut down on October 6.

== Reception ==
By November 2023, Ever Crisis had surpassed seven million downloads.
