= Dirge of Cerberus: Final Fantasy VII =

2006 video game

- North American box art featuring the protagonist Vincent Valentine
- Developer: Square Enix (Note: Additional work by Monolith Soft.)
- Publisher: Square Enix
- Director: Takayoshi Nakazato
- Producer: Yoshinori Kitase
- Programmer: Yoshiki Kashitani
- Artist: Yukio Nakatani
- Writer: Hiroki Chiba
- Composer: Masashi Hamauzu
- Series: Compilation of Final Fantasy VII; Final Fantasy
- Platform: PlayStation 2
- Release: JP: January 26, 2006; NA: August 15, 2006; EU: November 17, 2006; International: JP: September 4, 2008
- Genres: Action role-playing, third-person shooter
- Modes: Single-player, multiplayer

Dirge of Cerberus: Final Fantasy VII (Note: Japanese: ダージュ オブ ケルベロス -ファイナルファンタジーVII, Hepburn: -Dāju obu Keruberosu -Fainaru Fantajī Sebun-) is a 2006 action role-playing third-person shooter video game developed and published by Square Enix for the PlayStation 2. It is part of the Compilation of Final Fantasy VII metaseries, a multimedia collection set within the universe of the 1997 title Final Fantasy VII. The game is set three years after the events of the original game and focuses on one of the game's playable characters, Vincent Valentine. In the story, Vincent is targeted by Deepground, a mysterious organization that plans to awaken a creature known as Omega, with the ability to destroy the Planet.

As the first shooter game in the Final Fantasy series, the game's staff had various problems during development, and producer Yoshinori Kitase found the experience challenging. The team added role-playing elements in order to make the game more entertaining for traditional fans of the main series. When Dirge of Cerberus was released outside Japan, several aspects of the gameplay were modified in order to make it more appealing. In 2008, Square republished the game in Japan with the updates made for the Western versions. The game received mixed critical reaction.

== Gameplay ==
Vincent using lightning materia to damage two opponents at the same time.

Dirge of Cerberus is an action role-playing third-person shooter featuring real-time battles, with the HUD displaying information such as Vincent's hit points and magic points, the currently selected item and its quantity, and a cross-hair to aid in targeting enemies. The action is viewed from an over-the-shoulder perspective similar to Resident Evil 4, although players have the option to switch to a first-person perspective. Defeating enemies yields EXP, and at the end of each stage, the player can either use EXP to level up, increasing Vincent's stats, or convert it to Gil, the in-game currency which can be used to purchase items and equipment upgrades.

Unlike Final Fantasy VII, where a character could equip three types of equipment, weapon, armor, and accessory, Vincent's equipment consists solely of his weapon, which can contribute to his armor rating and enhance his stats through customization. Vincent has three basic gun frames available to him; a three-barrel handgun called Cerberus, a rifle called Hydra, and a machine gun called Griffon. There are also several different barrels available throughout the game; short, regular, and long, with longer barrels allowing easier long-range targeting, but reducing Vincent's movement speed due to their weight. Accessories, which can be attached to the weapons, include a sniper scope, charms that can increase Vincent's defense and decrease the weight of the gun, and Materia, which enables magic shots with special properties that consume Vincent's magic points. Ammunition capacity can also be increased through upgrades.

Vincent's Limit Breaks return from the original Final Fantasy VII, with two forms being available. The first is Galian Beast, in which Vincent transforms into a large creature with enhanced speed and strength, which lasts for 30 seconds. The second is Chaos, Vincent's most powerful form, which is only available in the final stages of the game.

== Plot ==
=== Background ===
Characters featured in Dirge of Cerberus.

Dirge of Cerberus centers on Vincent Valentine, who is the main playable character, although Cait Sith is playable for a single level. The game's main antagonists are the members of the organization Deepground, who plan to use the creature Omega to destroy the Planet's life. Their highest-ranking members are known as the Tsviets, and their leader is Weiss the Immaculate. The second highest-ranking member is Weiss' brother, Nero the Sable, who leads Deepground in the field. Other members of the Tsviets include Rosso the Crimson, Shelke the Transparent, and Azul the Cerulean.

The online mode of the game, which is only available in the Japanese version, also introduces a group called the Restrictors, who were the former leaders of Deepground before Weiss took over. The Restrictors' leader implanted microchips into the brainstems of all Deepground soldiers to ensure they never turn against the group. However, Weiss was able to overcome this control method, and the Tsviets wrenched control from the Restrictors. Although Weiss was successful in overthrowing the Restrictors, the leader of the Restrictors was able to implant a virus into Weiss' bloodstream.

=== Story ===
The game begins during the climax of Final Fantasy VII. As Vincent and Yuffie Kisaragi help to evacuate Midgar, which is about to be destroyed by Sephiroth's Meteor spell, Vincent finds the body of Professor Hojo slumped at the controls of the Sister Ray cannon. After a flash of lightning, Hojo's body seemingly disappears, and before Vincent can investigate, the cannon explodes, forcing Vincent to escape with Yuffie.

Three years later, Vincent is in the town of Kalm when it is attacked by a group of mysterious soldiers. Vincent, with help from his former comrade, Reeve Tuesti of the World Regenesis Organization (WRO), an organization dedicated to helping the planet recover from the events of Final Fantasy VII, fights the soldiers and forces them to retreat, but many citizens are captured or killed.

Reeve explains to Vincent that the soldiers were members of Deepground, a military organization created as part of a covert Shinra operation to create genetically enhanced super soldiers. Vincent soon learns that he is one of Deepground's primary targets, as he is unknowingly in possession of "Protomateria". It is a substance which he uses to control the "Chaos" gene within him, and which Deepground claims they need to control "Omega". According to ancient tablets discovered years ago, Chaos and Omega have an unknown but important relationship, with Chaos described as being "Omega's squire to the lofty heavens". The Chaos gene was injected into Vincent over thirty years ago by the scientist Lucrecia Crescent, Hojo's research assistant, whom Vincent was in love with.

In an effort to find answers, Vincent goes to the town of Nibelheim, where Lucrecia studied Omega and Chaos. While at Lucrecia's research lab, Vincent is ambushed by Rosso the Crimson, who steals the Protomateria but is prevented from killing Vincent by the arrival of Yuffie. As they return to the WRO headquarters, they find that Deepground has launched an assault on the base. However, Deepground member Shelke the Transparent has been captured by the WRO, and reveals that she is synaptically interconnected to Lucrecia's memories, allowing the WRO to complete Lucrecia's research on Omega. Shelke's sister, Shalua Rui, a high-ranking scientist in the WRO, soon discovers that Omega is a WEAPON, which activates when the Planet senses that it is in mortal danger. Omega's function is to absorb the Lifestream from the Planet and then move to another planet, leaving the inhabitants behind to die. Deepground plans to slaughter a huge number of people at once so as to 'trick' the planet into activating Omega prematurely.

Vincent and the WRO launch a full-scale assault on Deepground's headquarters in Midgar. While Reeve's team battles the Deepground soldiers and attempt to destroy the Mako reactors which serve as a means to revive Omega, Vincent heads to Deepground's center of operations to confront Weiss. He is surprised to find Weiss slumped in his chair, dead. However, as Omega begins to manifest itself, Weiss seemingly revives and confronts Vincent. It is revealed that Weiss is possessed by Hojo; before Hojo was killed in the Mako Cannon three years earlier, he uploaded his consciousness into the Worldwide Network, then took possession of Weiss's body while he was online attempting to find a cure for the virus the Restrictors had infected him with. Hojo/Weiss and Vincent battle to a standstill. However Nero, who had been defeated earlier by Vincent, emerges from the Lifestream and destroys Hojo. Nero then merges with Weiss to help him fuse with Omega, just as Vincent is fused with Chaos.

While the WRO continues to fight the remnants of Deepground, Vincent transforms into Chaos in a desperate attempt to defeat Omega Weiss. Shelke dives inside Omega to find Lucrecia's Protomateria, and upon finding it, she gives it to Vincent, telling him that his survival made Lucrecia happy. Vincent then takes control of Chaos and battles Omega. Omega sprouts wings and tries to ascend from the planet, but Vincent manages to destroy it, disappearing in the process. A week later, he is seen visiting Lucrecia's crystalline tomb in the Crystal Cave. He states that both Chaos and Omega have returned to the Planet, and thanks Lucrecia for being the reason he survived. He is then found by Shelke outside the cave, and she tells him that everyone else is waiting for him.

In the secret ending of the game, "G", a legendary warrior with unexplained connections to Deepground, awakes beneath the ruins of Midgar. He finds Weiss's body and picks it up, telling him "It is not yet time for slumber. We still have much work to do... My brother". He then sprouts a large black wing and flies into the night, carrying Weiss with him. Crisis Core Ultimania explains that "G" (Genesis) returned from his three-year slumber to protect the Planet.

== Development ==
When Final Fantasy VII: Advent Children began development, the Square Enix staff agreed that one title from Compilation of Final Fantasy VII was not enough to cover the entire world, and so Before Crisis, Dirge of Cerberus, and Crisis Core were conceived so as to embrace more aspects. With no official word from Square on the genre of the game, many publications and gamers speculated that it would be an action game similar to the Devil May Cry series. In 2004, however, character designer Tetsuya Nomura denied this, and said that the genre would surprise gamers. Producer Yoshinori Kitase decided the title to be a shooting game based on his love for first-person shooters and the challenge provided for the developers that would eventually improve their skills. He said that role-playing elements were added as the design work on pure action games was less appealing to developers. Monolith Soft assisted on development.

Vincent was chosen as the game's protagonist due to the scope for expanding his backstory, which was left very vague in Final Fantasy VII. The fact that his main weapon was a gun also worked into the team's desire to create a more action-oriented game. Prior to the solidification of the Compilation of Final Fantasy VII, the development team originally considered using other gunfighter characters from the Final Fantasy series, such as Final Fantasy VII's Barret Wallace, VIII's Irvine Kinneas or X-2's Yuna, but after the release of Before Crisis and Advent Children, and with the expansion of the Final Fantasy VII mythos, they settled on Vincent.

The main character designer for the game, Tetsuya Nomura, had also worked on both Final Fantasy VII and Advent Children. The Tsviets were designed with the idea of creating a sense of balance for the warriors with which players would already be familiar; primarily Vincent, Cloud Strife and Sephiroth. Nomura initially had doubts when designing Shelke's ordinary clothes for the end of the game, but he felt it was important for her to appear out of uniform so as to indicate she was truly free from Deepground. The character of G was based on the Japanese singer and actor Gackt, who wrote and performed the two theme songs of the game, and voiced G in the Japanese-language version of the game. Hideki Imaizumi, the producer of Crisis Core, liked the mysterious role of G so much, he decided to expand his character in that game. The character of Lucrecia Crescent, who features briefly in an optional quest in the original game, was redesigned so as to give her a similar appearance to her son, Sephiroth, based on portraits from guidebooks and in fan-art. Reeve Tuesti was also redesigned, as he only appears briefly in the original game as himself rather than through Cait Sith.

Dirge of Cerberus was first announced in September 2004, and was scheduled for release in Japan in 2005. The game's official site went online in April 2005. In May, Nomura said that several snippets from the game would be revealed during that year's E3, but no demo was shown at E3, as the staff were still trying to fix some issues with the controls in the game. In September, the beta test program was postponed indefinitely. Listed as 60% complete, the company stated if the beta test started with the game's current state, they would not be able to fully utilize the beta testers.

The North American and European releases of Dirge of Cerberus received a major overhaul as the developers were not completely satisfied with the final Japanese version of the game. They also wanted to make the game more single-player oriented, and as such, they removed Online Multiplayer support, primarily due to the lack of popularity of PlayOnline outside Japan, and lack of PS2 HDD support in the U.S. Missions from the Multiplayer Mode were reworked into unlockable secret missions in the English-language versions of the game, although none of the additional storyline presented in the Japanese Multiplayer Mode featured in the English versions. The Easy Mode, which was originally featured in the Japanese version to assist gamers not overly familiar with shooter games, was also removed. On September 4, 2008, the English-language version was released in Japan as Dirge of Cerberus: Final Fantasy VII International (Note: ダージュ オブ ケルベロス -ファイナルファンタジーVII- インターナショナル, Dāju obu Keruberosu - Fainaru Fantajī Sebun - Intānashonaru), as part of Square's Ultimate Hits lineup.

== Audio ==
The soundtrack for the game was composed by Masashi Hamauzu. Japanese singer and actor Gackt wrote and performed the two theme songs, "Longing" and "Redemption". For the game's ending theme, "Redemption", the staff originally planned for it to be a ballad, but Gackt decided to make it a rock song instead. Upon hearing Gackt's ideas, the staff were pleased with the direction in which he had gone. The CD soundtrack, Dirge of Cerberus: Final Fantasy VII Original Soundtrack, was released on February 15, 2006 in Japan. Consisting of two CDs, the soundtrack spanned 53 tracks. A limited edition of the soundtrack includes a "Cerberus Complete Case" deluxe box designed to hold the soundtrack along with the Dirge of Cerberus: Final Fantasy VII PS2 game and the limited edition of Gackt's single for the game, "Redemption". This single was released on January 25, 2006. A limited edition was also released featuring two "Redemption" video clips; Gackt's promotional music video, and an alternate video using clips from the game.

A supplemental soundtrack was released through the Japanese iTunes service and the Square-Enix Music Download page on August 22, 2006. Titled Dirge of Cerberus: Final Fantasy VII Multiplayer Mode Original Sound Collections, this album consists of 27 tracks, including several songs from the single player game which were not included in the official soundtrack, as well as all of the original music composed for the multiplayer mode, and two new songs composed by Ryo Yamazaki for the North American release of the game.

== Reception ==
Reception

Aggregate scores
Aggregator	Score
GameRankings	60%
Metacritic	57/100

Review scores
Publication	Score
1Up.com	D+
Electronic Gaming Monthly	C
Eurogamer	5/10
Famitsu	28/40
GameSpot	6.0/10
GameSpy	3/5
GameTrailers	7.2/10
IGN	7.0/10
X-Play	2/5
Dengeki PS2	313/400

Dirge of Cerberus received mixed reviews from critics. At GameRankings, the game holds a score of 60%. The combined score from Metacritic is 57 out of 100 based on 51 reviews.

GameSpot stated that the game "does have a few interesting and even entertaining moments, but will ultimately leave action game fans and Final Fantasy fans feeling unfulfilled". Despite stating that it is not "the best use of the Final Fantasy VII universe", IGN called it "a decent game with a strong story and occasionally-engaging rifle blasting". 1UP.com criticized the enemies' artificial intelligence and weak scenarios, and labeling the story "boring". Reviewer from Electronic Gaming Monthly's Shane Bettenhausen opined that he found all of the titles (As of 2006) in the Compilation of Final Fantasy VII to be unappealing. Eurogamer found that Dirge of Cerberus was a "risky gamble" by Square Enix, as their first shooter, and he criticized the fact that most of the main characters in the game were either optional in Final Fantasy VII or had only small roles. GameSpy called its gameplay and plot "interesting", but found other aspects generic. GameTrailers praised the game's storyline, calling it "convoluted, but incredibly impressive in its scope". They also praised the changes Square had made to the Western versions but found the game to be very similar to Devil May Cry, and felt that it didn't make good enough use of Vincent's abilities. While the CGI cutscenes and designs also received positive comments, the lack of variety in enemy types was criticized. G4's game review show, X-Play, responded negatively, citing poor level design, weak gameplay, too many cutscenes, and bad AI.

=== Sales ===
Dirge of Cerberus: Final Fantasy VII shipped 392,000 units in its first week. As of August 2008, 460,000 units were sold in North America and 270,000 units in Europe. Three months later, over 513,000 copies of the game have been sold in Japan alone. In July 2006, Dirge of Cerberus was in Sony's Gold category of top-selling video games (the Gold category includes games which have sold anything from 500,000 units to 1 million).

== Mobile phone games ==
Dirge of Cerberus Lost Episode: Final Fantasy VII (Note: ダージュ オブ ケルベロス ロスト エピソード -ファイナルファンタジーVII-, Dāju obu Keruberosu Rosuto Episōdo -Fainaru Fantajī Sebun-) was co-developed by Square Enix and Ideaworks3D, and published by Square Enix. The game was released on August 22, 2006 in North America and July 26, 2007 in Japan. Initially only available on Amp'd Mobile phones, the game was subsequently made available on Verizon's V Cast network. It was also unveiled as a flagship title for NTT DoCoMo's FOMA 903i handset at the 2006 Tokyo Game Show. The title initially contained only a single player mode, with a multiplayer function introduced at a later date. Lost Episode involves a 'missing' chapter of Dirge of Cerberus taking place between two events of the main game.

IGN called it "passable", arguing that the graphics did not fit the mobile phone, causing a sense of imbalance.

The game's storyline was recreated in the mobile game Final Fantasy VII: Ever Crisis.
