= Shogo Suzuki =

Shogo Suzuki or Shōgo Suzuki may refer to:

- Shōgo Suzuki (actor, born 1963) (鈴木 省吾), Japanese actor, voice actor and narrator
- Shogo Suzuki (actor, born 1989) (鈴木 勝吾), Japanese actor and musician
