= Final Fantasy VII: Advent Children =

Japanese 2005 3D animated film by Tetsuya Nomura

- Theatrical release poster

Japanese name
- Kanji: ファイナルファンタジーVII アドベントチルドレン
Transcriptions
- Revised Hepburn: Fainarufantajī VII adobentochirudoren
- Directed by: Tetsuya Nomura
- Written by: Kazushige Nojima
- Based on: Final Fantasy VII by Square Enix
- Produced by: Yoshinori Kitase; Shinji Hashimoto; Ichiro Hazama
- Starring: Takahiro Sakurai; Ayumi Ito; Kenichi Suzumura; Showtaro Morikubo; Maaya Sakamoto; Toshiyuki Morikawa; Shōgo Suzuki
- Cinematography: Yasuharu Yoshizawa
- Edited by: Keiichi Kojima
- Music by: Nobuo Uematsu
- Production companies: Visual Works; Square Enix Holdings
- Distributed by: Sony Pictures Releasing
- Release dates: 14 September 2005 (Japan); 24 April 2006 (North America); 25 April 2006 (Europe)
- Running time: 101 minutes
- Country: Japan
- Languages: Japanese; English

Final Fantasy VII: Advent Children (Note: Japanese: ファイナルファンタジーVII アドベントチルドレン, Hepburn: Fainaru Fantajī Sebun Adobento Chirudoren) is a 2005 Japanese animated science fantasy action-adventure film directed by Tetsuya Nomura, written by Kazushige Nojima, and produced by Yoshinori Kitase and Shinji Hashimoto. Developed by Visual Works and Square Enix, Advent Children is part of the Compilation of Final Fantasy VII series of media, which is based in the world and continuity of the 1997 role-playing video game Final Fantasy VII. Final Fantasy VII: Advent Children was released on DVD and Universal Media Disc with Japanese voice acting in Japan on September 14, 2005, and on April 25, 2006, with English voice acting in North America and the United Kingdom.

Advent Children takes place two years after the events of Final Fantasy VII and focuses on the appearance of a trio that kidnaps children infected with an unexplained disease called Geostigma. Final Fantasy VII hero Cloud Strife, suffering from the same disease, goes to rescue the children. He discovers that the trio plan to resurrect Sephiroth using the remains of the extraterrestrial villain Jenova, and he and his compatriots from the game fight to stop them. The film's voice acting cast includes Takahiro Sakurai, Ayumi Ito, and Toshiyuki Morikawa in Japanese, and Steve Burton, Rachael Leigh Cook, and George Newbern in English.

Advent Children received mixed reviews; critics praised its animation and CGI, but criticized the plot as being incomprehensible to viewers who did not play Final Fantasy VII and having a thin connection between action scenes. The film received the "Maria Award" at the Sitges Film Festival in 2005 and the "Best Anime Feature" at the 2007 American Anime Awards. The original release was one of the best-selling animated films in Japan and the United States in its release year. An extended version, Final Fantasy VII: Advent Children Complete, was released on Blu-ray Disc in 2009, adding 26 minutes of new and expanded scenes to the 101-minute original. The Complete release was noted as driving a large increase in sales of the PlayStation 3 console in its release week. By May 2009, the DVD and Universal Media Disc releases had sold over 4.1 million copies worldwide. Advent Children (the Complete version) returned to Japanese theaters from January 19, 2024, to February 1, 2024, and returned to stateside theaters on February 21, 2024, to promote the launch of the video game Final Fantasy VII Rebirth.

== Plot ==
=== Setting ===
Advent Children takes place two years following the events of the 1997 role-playing video game Final Fantasy VII, during which the antagonist Sephiroth attempted to absorb the Lifestream, the lifeblood and soul of the Planet, and be reborn as a god. He was defeated by Cloud Strife and his companions, but his final spell, Meteor, destroyed the city of Midgar.

Since the end of the game, the survivors of Midgar founded the new city of Edge, where Cloud and his childhood friend Tifa Lockhart now run a courier service and are the caretakers of an orphan Denzel and the adopted daughter of Barret Wallace, Marlene. Out of guilt for failing to save Aerith Gainsborough, Cloud has recently moved out and isolated himself from his friends. The story also portrays that many people, including Cloud and Denzel, are infected with a mysterious and incurable disease known as "Geostigma".

=== Story ===
Cloud is contacted through Tifa and summoned to a meeting with the Shinra Company's former president Rufus Shinra, who was presumed dead in Final Fantasy VII. Rufus asks for Cloud's help to stop Kadaj, Loz, and Yazoo, who are the physical manifestation of Sephiroth's surviving spirit and seek to resurrect him using the remains of the extraterrestrial villain Jenova. Cloud refuses to help and leaves.

Meanwhile, Kadaj and his colleagues are recruiting children infected with Geostigma, and Denzel falls in with the group after being attracted by their promises of a cure. Loz follows Tifa and Marlene to Aerith's church, where they are searching for Cloud, and attacks them. Tifa is knocked unconscious in the fight, and Loz kidnaps Marlene. The abducted children are taken to the ruins of the Forgotten City, where Kadaj embraces them as brethren and announces his intention for them to be reunited with Jenova. When Cloud arrives to rescue them, Kadaj's gang overpowers him, but he is saved by the arrival of his old comrade Vincent Valentine. Cloud then returns to the city, where Kadaj has summoned Bahamut SIN and other monsters to terrorize the population. With the help of his companions, Cloud engages and defeats the monsters.

Kadaj confronts Rufus Shinra, who reveals he possesses Jenova's remains. He attempts to destroy it, but Kadaj saves it and flees the city with his companions, with Yazoo and Loz being caught in a blast by an explosive planted by Reno and Rude. Cloud chases Kadaj down and engages him in battle, ultimately subduing him. Outmatched, Kadaj opens Jenova's box and fuses with its contents, transforming into Sephiroth. He tells Cloud he will use the souls of Geostigma's deceased victims to dominate the Planet. He and Cloud then fight; throughout the encounter, Sephiroth appears to have the upper hand and ultimately impales him through the shoulder. He asks Cloud to tell him what he most cherishes so that he can have the pleasure of taking it away. Cloud replies that he cherishes everything and then uses his Limit Break, Omnislash Ver. 5, to defeat Sephiroth. Sephiroth's spirit departs, leaving behind the mortally wounded Kadaj. As he lies dying in Cloud's arms, a healing rain starts falling across the land, curing the people of their Geostigma. Yazoo and Loz appear and confront Cloud; setting off a massive explosion that engulfs the three.

Cloud has visions of his deceased friends Aerith and Zack Fair, who say that his time to join them has not yet come. He then awakens in the church, healed of his injuries and surrounded by his friends. Behind them, he sees the spirits of Aerith and Zack, smiling at him before departing to the afterlife. Aerith says to Cloud, "You see, everything's all right". He agrees: "I know. I'm not alone... not anymore". Cloud and the sick children celebrate by bathing in the rainwater.

During the credits, Cloud is seen driving his motorcycle to parts unknown. Advent Children Complete adds a new post-credit scene where Zack's Buster Sword is seen in Aerith's church while flowers from the church are seen blooming at the location of Zack's last stand, having been placed there by Cloud.

== Voice cast ==
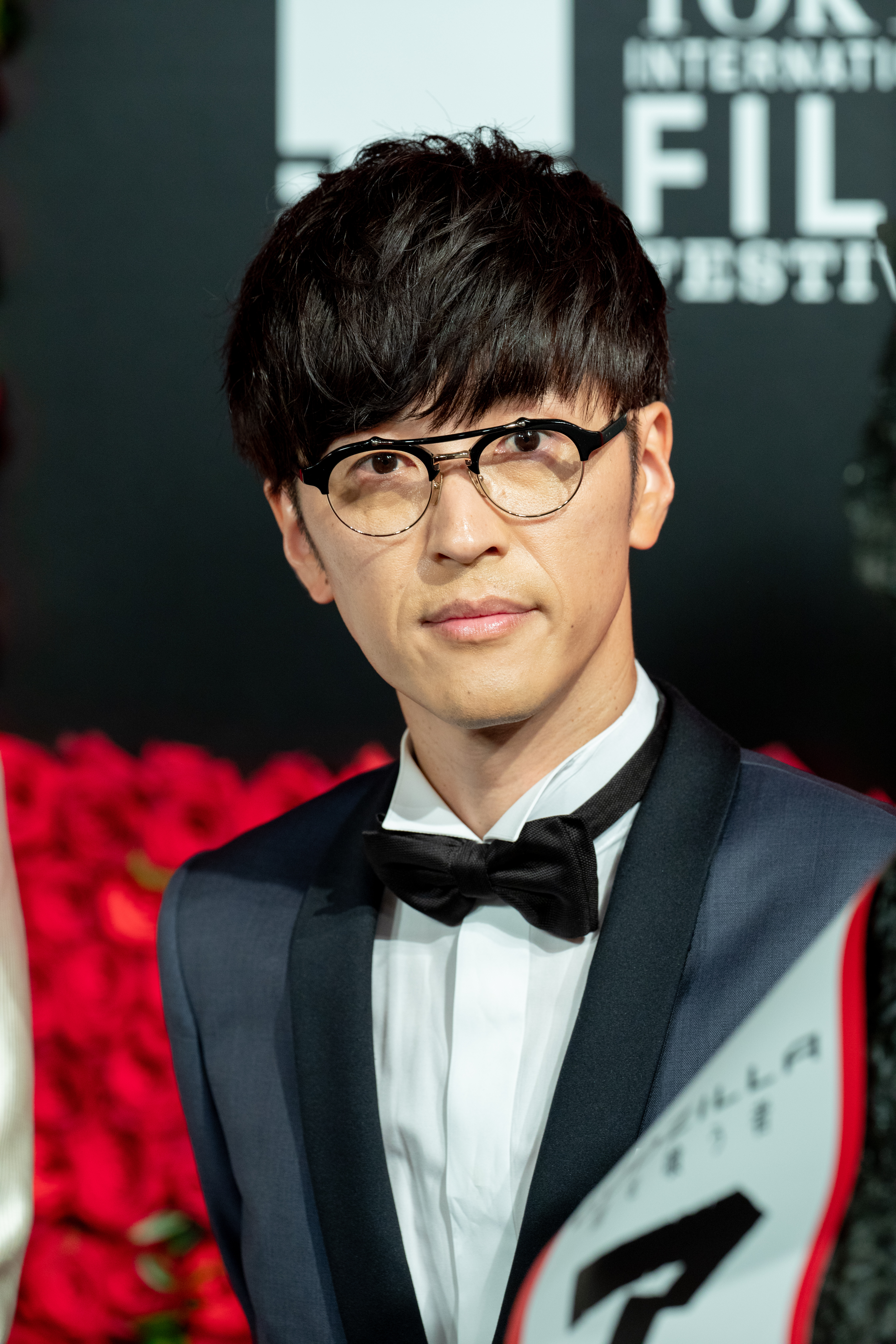
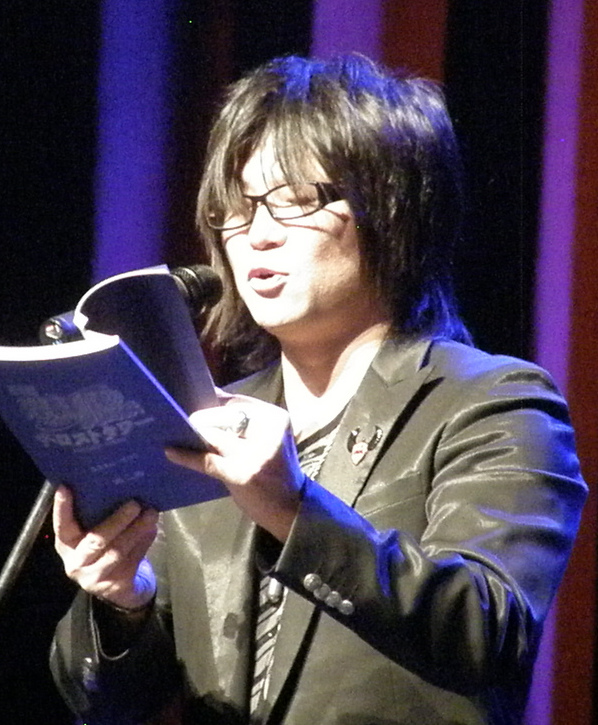
Takahiro Sakurai (left) and Toshiyuki Morikawa (right) voiced Cloud Strife and Sephiroth, respectively.

Advent Children was released with a Japanese voice track in Japan, and an English voice track elsewhere.

- Takahiro Sakurai/Steve Burton as Cloud Strife. Sakurai and Burton had voiced the character in Kingdom Hearts.
- Ayumi Ito/Rachael Leigh Cook as Tifa Lockhart. Nomura felt that Ito's "husky" voice would offer a good contrast with Maaya Sakamoto, Cook had voiced Tifa in Kingdom Hearts II.
- Maaya Sakamoto/Mena Suvari as Aerith Gainsborough. Sakamoto had voiced the character in Kingdom Hearts, Suvari had voiced Aerith in Kingdom Hearts II.
- Shōgo Suzuki/Steve Blum as Vincent Valentine. Nomura wanted Cloud and Vincent to have noticeably different voices because they were otherwise quite similar. Since Vincent was older and more mature than Cloud, his role was given to Suzuki, who has a very low voice.
- Showtaro Morikubo/Steve Staley as Kadaj. Morikubo had difficulties voicing him because of the character's unstable personality and needed time to adjust to the role.
- Kenji Nomura/Fred Tatasciore as Loz. Nomura was told by the staff to voice Loz as an "idiot" character.
- Yūji Kishi/Dave Wittenberg as Yazoo.
- Toshiyuki Morikawa/George Newbern as Sephiroth. Morikawa was instructed to pronounce Sephiroth's lines in such a way that his words would convey his feelings of superiority. In tandem with this, the voice director and Morikawa agreed to make Sephiroth's voice sound always calm, as if he never fears the slightest possibility of defeat.
- Yumi Kakazu/Christy Carlson Romano as Yuffie Kisaragi.
- Masahiro Kobayashi/Beau Billingslea as Barret Wallace.
- Keiji Fujiwara/Quinton Flynn as Reno.
- Taiten Kusunoki/Crispin Freeman as Rude.
- Tōru Ōkawa/Wally Wingert as Rufus Shinra.
- Kenichi Suzumura/Rick Gomez as Zack Fair.
- Hideo Ishikawa/Greg Ellis as Cait Sith.
- Masachika Ichimura/Liam O'Brien as Red XIII / Nanaki.
- Kazuhiro Yamaji/Chris Edgerly as Cid Highwind.

== Production ==
Advent Children began as a short film by Visual Works, a company used by Square to develop CGI scenes for their video games, based on Final Fantasy VII. Kazushige Nojima, who had written the script for the game, was brought on to write a 20-minute script. He decided to write "a story about Cloud and Tifa and the kids". The film was developed as a part of the Compilation of Final Fantasy VII, a set of different media content intended to expand upon the world of Final Fantasy VII. Square's research and development department worked with Visual Works on the piece, and Tetsuya Nomura joined the crew after VII's director Yoshinori Kitase called him. Early in pre-production, the team thought about making Advent Children into a game. Still, Nomura decided against it, partially because Visual Works had no experience making a full game. The creators had no prior experience working on films, so they fell back on their knowledge of in-game movies.

The film was planned to focus on the characters of Cloud and Tifa in a similar way to how other titles from Compilation of Final Fantasy VII centered on certain characters; for example, Before Crisis focuses on the Turks, Crisis Core on Zack Fair, and Dirge of Cerberus on Vincent. Nomura says the film was, in its first manifestation, only going to be 20 minutes long. The original story featured someone requesting a message to be sent to Cloud; the message is relayed to Cloud through several children. When the message finally reaches Cloud, it is revealed who the messenger is. Nomura very much liked the original script, and it became the foundation of the final version. He decided to make the project longer and grander in scope when the early word of the film generated great interest among Final Fantasy VII fans, most of whom wanted something feature-length. The film's length was expanded to 100 minutes.

Takeshi Nozue and Nomura, who had first worked together on the video game Kingdom Hearts, split the role of directing, as Nomura felt this would add depth to the film. In designing the battle scenes, they first discussed the setting and layout. They then went to the staff with their ideas, deciding which were the best and developing them further. The battle between Cloud's group and Bahamut was the most difficult to design due to the size of the area and the number of objects the staff had to add to the scene to keep it realistic. The alternating positions of the characters, including Bahamut itself, took the staff a long time to complete to give the scene a sense of flow. Nomura said that the team decided not to worry about making the fight sequences realistic, as they felt this would restrict their ability to give the film a "cool look". Therefore, they worked by creating their "own rules". Motion capture was used for many of the film's battle scenes; maneuvers that were not physically possible for live actors to perform were constructed digitally.

While designing the characters, the staff discovered that it was impossible to translate the Final Fantasy VII designs into the film. Thus some identifying characteristics had to be discarded. Cloud's redesign was a combination of eight different designs, from his super deformed appearance in the game to his more realistic appearance in the film. The difficulties in making Sephiroth led the staff to reduce his appearances in the film. It took them two years to develop and refine his look. Nozue also had difficulty developing a framework for Tifa's body that was "balanced, yet showed off her feminine qualities". Kadaj, Loz, and Yazoo were designed to be a manifestations of Sephiroth's spirit—his cruelty, strength, and allure respectively. In contrast to Sephiroth, the trio was meant to be younger than Cloud, to focus on the "next generation" theme. By October 2003, the film was 10% complete; while the script was written, not all the characters were designed.

Nomura felt that Advent Children differed from Hollywood films, where the meaning of most scenes tends to be explained. However, with Advent Children, the staff wanted viewers to interpret the scenes individually, allowing them to come to different conclusions. Nojima described the theme of the film as "survival". Other themes Nomura and Nojima were concerned to include Cloud's feelings of guilt and regret for failing to save his friends Zack and Aerith. These feelings are symbolized by a grey wolf that appears whenever Cloud thinks about them. The wolf disappears at the end of the film as Cloud comes to terms with his feelings. The word "children" was used in the title to refer to the film's children, as they represent the "next generation".

=== Music ===
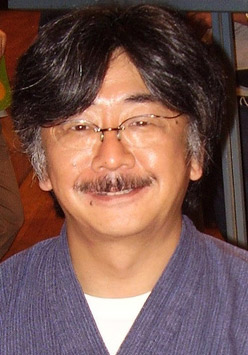
Nobuo Uematsu in 2006

The music of Final Fantasy VII Advent Children was composed by Nobuo Uematsu, Keiji Kawamori, Kenichiro Fukui, and Tsuyoshi Sekito, and arranged by Fukui, Sekito, Kawamori, Shirō Hamaguchi, and Kazuhiko Toyama. Nomura would make some changes and have the composers re-record the piece upon hearing each track. The end theme, "Calling", was written and performed by former Boøwy vocalist Kyosuke Himuro. The soundtrack includes both pieces original to the film and arrangements of works from Final Fantasy VII, originally composed by Uematsu. Some of the arrangements, including "Advent: One-Winged Angel", are performed by The Black Mages, a rock band formed by Uematsu, Fukui, and Sekito. Both the pieces are original to the film, and the film arrangements cover a variety of musical styles, including orchestral, choral, classical piano, and rock music; Variety noted that the styles vary between "sparse piano noodlings, pop-metal thrashings, and cloying power ballads". The 2005 soundtrack album Final Fantasy VII Advent Children Original Soundtrack collects 26 tracks of music from the film on two discs. Square Enix published it on September 28, 2005. In addition to the regular release, a limited edition was produced containing alternative cover art and a booklet of credits and lyrics. The soundtrack album reached position #15 on the Japanese Oricon music charts and stayed on the charts for ten weeks.

A mini-album entitled Final Fantasy VII Advent Children Complete Mini Album was released on April 10, 2009, to coincide with the release of the Final Fantasy VII Advent Children Complete version of the film. This version of the film included a new ending theme, "Safe and Sound", by Kyosuke Himuro and My Chemical Romance singer Gerard Way. "Water" was replaced with a new song—"Anxious Heart". Tracks on the album included new versions of "The Chase of Highway", "Fight On!", "Sign", "Advent: One-Winged Angel", and "On the Way to a Smile". A larger album, Final Fantasy VII Advent Children Complete: Reunion Tracks, was released with 21 tracks on September 16 the same year. This album contains the tracks from the mini-album and several lengthened pieces for the Complete film version but not rearranged. Reunion Tracks appeared on the Oricon charts for a single week at position #108.

== Promotion and release ==
Advent Children and the Compilation of Final Fantasy VII series were first announced at the 2003 Tokyo Game Show in September, the former as a direct-to-DVD film. The first trailer for the film was featured in the international version of the video game Final Fantasy X-2, released in February 2004. The trailer used a motion capture that was altered in the final film. Advent Children was initially scheduled for a September 13, 2005, release in North America and a September 14 in Japan, but the North American release date was pushed back several times. It was first moved to November, then to January 2006, and finally scheduled for April 25 for release on DVD and Universal Media Discs for the PlayStation Portable.

In 2004, Panasonic produced the Japanese exclusive FOMA P900iV cell phone identical to the one Cloud uses in the movie; the phone contained several features related to Advent Children such as wallpapers and ringtones. Before the film's release, Square Enix serialized the web novel "On the Way to a Smile" written by Kazushige Nojima on the Japanese Advent Children website on September 5, 2005, which was later released with "Episode: Tifa" by Shueisha in a 118-page book about the film's story titled Final Fantasy VII Advent Children Prologue Book on September 14, 2005. On September 8, 2005, Square Enix premiered the movie in Japan at Virgin Toho Cinemas Roppongi Hills in Tokyo. Following the premiere, from September 10 to September 16, Square Enix screened the movie at Virgin Toho Cinemas Roppongi Hills in Tokyo, Toho Cinemas Nagoya Bay City in Nagoya, and Toho Cinemas Nijou in Kyoto. The movie screened once per day at 6:30 p.m.. In order to view the movie, fans had to receive an invite from Square Enix by already being registered to the official "Shinra Company" online fan club on Square Enix's website. In 2006, SoftBank Creative published a guidebook entitled Final Fantasy VII Advent Children Reunion Files, which contains interviews with the film's staff and information regarding the development of the film.

A limited edition of the film titled Final Fantasy VII Advent Pieces was released in Japan simultaneously as Advent Children; only 77,777 sets were produced. The edition contains various pieces of merchandise, a copy of the script, the original Final Fantasy VII game, a strategy guidebook for the game, and a disc containing the original video animation (OVA) Last Order: Final Fantasy VII. Nomura stated that meaning of the name Advent Pieces was that "advent" means "the recognition and commemoration of something", while "pieces" was added to bring special meaning to the release. A special one-time-only theatrical screening of the English version of the film took place on April 3, 2006, at the Arclight Theatre in Los Angeles. The event was promoted via email to those who subscribed to the Square Enix mailing list. The screening included trailers of the video games Kingdom Hearts II and Dirge of Cerberus, and featured appearances from the English language cast and the Japanese developers.

The film's DVD release is a 2-disc set that contains several bonus features, including Last Order. Final Fantasy VII Advent Children (Limited Edition Collector's Set) was released in North America on February 20, 2007. The set included more bonus material than the previous DVD releases, including a copy of the script, several postcards with imagery from the film, and the first three stories from the On the Way to a Smile short story series.

=== Final Fantasy VII: Advent Children Complete ===
In addition to new scenes and higher visual quality, the director's cut added new details. In this example, the director's cut (above) adds a wound across Cloud's left cheek, and blood smears on his right arm.

A director's cut of the film, entitled Final Fantasy VII Advent Children Complete, was released in Japan on April 16, 2009, exclusively for the Blu-ray format. A separate version was sold that included a demo of Final Fantasy XIII. Both editions included the first HD trailers of Final Fantasy Versus XIII and Final Fantasy Agito XIII, though the third edition without the extra videos or demos was also released. On April 11 and 12, days before Advent Children Complete's release, Square Enix held four special screenings of Advent Children Complete at the Ginza Sony Building in Tokyo. There were 800 seats available to those who reserved the Blu-ray or the PlayStation 3 bundle at the Square Enix e-store and were Square Enix's online website members.

Advent Children Complete has a higher visual quality than the original release, is 26 minutes longer than the film's original cut, and contains roughly one thousand revised scenes. Themes expanded in Advent Children Complete include Cloud's development, Denzel's background, and a more in-depth view of the Turks and Rufus Shinra. The film's staff wanted to add links to the other titles in the Compilation of Final Fantasy VII released since the original film. This version has more violence, specifically blood during the fights, as the staff wanted to bring a "dirtier" look to the film, with characters' faces and clothes getting darker and dirtier throughout the battles. Additionally, the fight between Cloud and Sephiroth was expanded by several minutes and included a scene in which Sephiroth impales Cloud on his sword and holds him in the air, mirroring the scene in the game where he performs the same action.

During the same year, Advent Children Complete was released in North America on June 2, and in the UK on July 27. The North American and European versions come with a new trailer for Final Fantasy XIII rather than a demo. The releases in all regions also feature an animated piece entitled "On the Way to a Smile - Episode: Denzel", as well as the story digests "Reminiscence of Final Fantasy VII" and "Reminiscence of Final Fantasy VII Compilation". The Japanese and English voice actors returned to record additional dialogues for the new and expanded scenes. Nomura said that they had no major problems with this process, noting that Sakurai and Morikawa were already used to their characters from voicing them in other media. However, some child characters, most notably Denzel and Marlene, had to be recast and have all their lines re-recorded. The original performers' voices now sounded more mature in both languages. Nomura has stated that while Advent Children Complete did not represent the end of Compilation of Final Fantasy VII, as the staff still had more ideas, it marked "the end of the Advent Children saga" as there would be no more re-releases or extended versions. Later, Advent Children Complete was released in Ultra HD Blu-ray on June 8, 2021, by Sony Pictures Home Entertainment.

== Tie-ins ==
=== Last Order: Final Fantasy VII ===
Last Order: Final Fantasy VII is an original video animation directed by Morio Asaka, written by Kazuhiko Inukai, and animated by Madhouse. It depicts an alternate rendition of two flashbacks found within Final Fantasy VII. It was originally released in Japan on the Advent Pieces DVD, on September 14, 2005. It was released in North America in the Limited Edition Collector's Set on February 20, 2007, and in Europe on November 6, 2008. There is currently no English dub for the film, and the North America and Europe versions are subtitled.

=== On the Way to a Smile ===
On the Way to a Smile is a series of short stories between Final Fantasy VII and Advent Children. Written by Kazushige Nojima, the first story, "Case of Denzel", was released in a serialized form on the official Japanese Advent Children website. "Case of Denzel" is told indirectly from the perspective of Denzel, who has requested an interview with Reeve Tuesti in the hopes that he may become part of Reeve's newly formed World Regenesis Organization, an army devoted to rebuilding the Planet. Denzel tells his life story, including how he became an orphan, the events leading up to his becoming afflicted with Geostigma, and how he came under the care of Tifa and Cloud. "Case of Denzel" was adapted into On the Way to a Smile - Episode: Denzel, a short OVA animated by A-1 Pictures and directed by Shinji Ishihara, that was released with Advent Children Complete.

The second short story, "Case of Tifa", is Tifa's account of the events following Meteor's destruction and her life with Cloud, overlapping in part with Denzel's story. A third On the Way to a Smile story, "Case of Barrett", involves Barret and his struggles to find a new energy source for the world's people. To coincide with the release of Advent Children Complete in 2009, four more stories were written: "Case of Red XIII", "Case of Yuffie", "Case of Shinra", and "Case of Lifestream - Black & White". All the stories were released together as a book titled On the Way to a Smile at the same time that Advent Children Complete was released.

== Reception ==
=== Sales ===
The DVD releases of Advent Children sold over 410,000 copies in Japan during their first week on sale, with roughly half of the sales coming from the limited edition. The DVD and UMD releases combined sold over 700,000 units in Japan in the first three weeks and over one million copies by January 2006. In a 2005 Oricon Japanese sales report, the regular edition of the DVD ranked twelfth on the bestseller list in Japan for the entire year after one week of sales, and the limited edition ranked fifteenth. The two editions ranked third and fourth on the animated feature sublist. The English language DVD sold over 960,000 units, which translated to almost US$15 million in revenue by the fifth week of release. In the United States, it sold over 832,000 copies by May 2006, and eventually grossed over US$58 million in DVD sales in the country. The DVD ranked a "surprise" #2 during its first week on the American Nielsen VideoScan sales charts after being released in North America. Nielsen's "Top Selling Anime Releases of 2006" report had Advent Children ranked first, and the 2006 report by the Japan External Trade Organization also ranked the film as the best-selling Japanese anime DVD in the United States. In the 2007 list, the DVD was at the tenth spot. As of June 2006, the DVD and UMD releases combined sold over 2.4 million units worldwide, with 1 million units sold in Japan, 1.3 million in North America, and 100,000 in Europe. By May 2009, just before the release of Advent Children Complete, the film had sold over 4.1 million copies across all versions.

On its first day of release, over 100,000 Blu-ray copies of Advent Children Complete were sold in Japan across all three versions. During its initial week, the Blu-ray was #2 on the American Nielsen VideoScan Blu-ray bestseller list, with 274,774 units sold. During 2009, the regular version of Advent Children Complete sold 49,000 units in Japan according to Oricon, ranking second in their category "Animation/Special Effects Blu-ray Discs". It ranked eighth in the category "Overall Blu-ray Discs, by Yen" with 310 million yen (US$3.4 million) sold in 2009. Gaming sites Gamasutra and Kotaku cited Advent Children Complete as one of the main reasons why sales of the PlayStation 3 video game console radically increased during the film's first week of release.

=== Critical response ===
Advent Children has received mixed reviews. On review aggregator website Rotten Tomatoes, the film received an approval rating of 50% based on 8 reviews, with an average rating of 5.7/10. The computer-animated graphics were generally praised; 1UP.com's James Mielke, who awarded the film an "A−", said the quality and clarity of the CG visuals were "genuinely amazing". Anime News Network writer Carlo Santos praised the animation while awarding the film a "B", calling it "outstanding". About.com's Roger Altizer, while giving the film overall 2 1/2 stars out of 5, cited the visuals as one of its few positive points. The film's plot was generally criticized as confusing; Leslie Felperin of Variety, in a sharply negative review, described the plot as "soulless" and "utterly impenetrable" to anyone who had not played the game, and Anime News Network's Santos agreed that people who had not played Final Fantasy VII would not understand the story. Mania Entertainment's John Eriani also found the plot confusing to non-players, though he liked how the characters were further explored in the film. Todd Douglass Jr. from DVD Talk, while "highly recommending" the film, praised Cloud's character development in particular. About.com's Altizer summarized the plot and dialogue as "weak", and IGN's Chris Carle, in their 9 out of 10 reviews, felt that the plot was just an excuse to get to the next action sequence. The story digest "Reminiscence of Final Fantasy VII", included with the DVD to explain the plot of Final Fantasy VII, was described by Anime News Network's Santos as "just as confusing as the movie" and of no help in explaining the plot to anyone who had not already played the game, though Carle of IGN felt it was helpful to those who had not played the game in a while.

The action scenes were generally praised. RPGamer's Michael Beckett, while giving the film a 4 out of 5, lauded the film's fighting scenes, calling them "mesmerizing" and the primary focus of the film. Anime News Network's Santos also heavily praised the action sequences, and Felperin of Variety felt they were the only point to the film, which they felt focused entirely on the technical aspects of the action. The music received mixed reviews; Eriani of Mania Entertainment heavily praised it, as did Santos of Anime News Network, but 1UP.com's Mielke called it "a bit sappy". Douglass Jr. from DVD Talk concluded that Advent Children "is pretty much the film that fans all over the world have been waiting for"; RPGamer's Beckett said that "the film feels very much like a love letter to the fans of Final Fantasy VII"; and IGN's Carle summed up the film as "glorious, beautiful, well-executed fan service".

Destructoid noted there was a message within the writing of the film regarding the characters' lives in Midgar, leading them to move on with their lives in a similar fashion to Final Fantasy VII gamers, since the story ended with Cloud saving Midgar from Sephiroth's resurrection. Kotaku saw the focus on the Midgar's ruins as a parallelism with psychological trauma due to how all of its survivors suffer a disease that cannot be fought with Cloud's striking weaponry on its own.

The director's cut, Advent Children Complete, was generally praised over the original version. Joystiq's Andrew Yoon found Advent Children Complete a better film, feeling it was more accessible to people who had not played Final Fantasy VII. Blu-ray.com' Dustin Somner called it "a nice improvement on an entertaining film", and DVD Talk's Todd Douglass Jr. said it was "the best version of the film" due to its audio quality, the new scenes, and the expansion of Cloud's battle against Sephiroth. Douglass also found the addition of On the Way to a Smile - Episode: Denzel to be a welcome edition, though he felt that the bonus features as a whole were underwhelming, belying the "Complete" title. Yoon of Joystiq thought that the new scenes helped give more depth to Cloud's development, to the point of "humanizing" him, though he felt the change in pacing for some scenes made the plot hard to follow. Kotaku writer AJ Glasser, however, summed up the director's cut as "26 extra minutes and it still doesn't make any sense", saying that the new scenes did little to improve the plot of the film itself.

=== Legacy ===
Advent Children received the Honorary Maria Award at the Sitges Film Festival on October 15, 2005. The film was also awarded "best anime feature" at the 2007 American Anime Awards. IGN placed it second in their "Top 10 Straight-to-DVD Animated Movies" list.

In 2007, the music video for the song "Sonata of Temptation" by Korean singer Ivy recreated the fight between Tifa and Loz. The director of the video, Hong Jung-ho, stated that it was just a parody of the film but could not get Square Enix's official permission. That December, Square Enix launched a lawsuit against Fantom Entertainment (Ivy's agency) and Hong, asking for ₩160,000,000 total. In April 2008, the Seoul District Court ruled that the video was considered plagiarism and ordered Fantom Entertainment and Hong to pay the fine. The video was subsequently banned from airing on Korean television.

OverClocked ReMix's four-disc Final Fantasy VII unofficial tribute album, Voices of the Lifestream, contains one disc remixing music from the film.

Final Fantasy XIII director Motomu Toriyama has stated that he felt the film showed "battles that have not been achievable in FF so far", and so tried to design the battle system for Final Fantasy XIII to create cinematic battles like the film.

Cloud's design from the film is available as an alternate costume for Cloud in the crossover fighting games Super Smash Bros. for Nintendo 3DS and Wii U and Super Smash Bros. Ultimate. The reveal trailer for Sephiroth as downloadable content in Super Smash Bros. Ultimate recreates the final battle between him and Cloud from the film, and several songs from the film appear as part of the Sephiroth DLC pack. As part of the update, the Final Smash of Cloud's Advent Children costume was changed to Omnislash Ver. 5.

The film's storyline was announced in 2021 to be included as part of the mobile gacha game Final Fantasy VII: Ever Crisis, alongside other Compilation of Final Fantasy VII entries such as the original 1997 game and Crisis Core. In September 2025, 2 years after the game's initial release, 'Final Fantasy VII Advent Children EC Edition' was launched as an in-game 'Event'. This event involves reused footage from the film and limited battles, rather than a full storyline recreation like the ones received by other Compilation entries included in Ever Crisis at that time.

Nia DaCosta, director of The Marvels (2023), said that she cited Advent Children in her pitch for her film.

== Bibliography ==
- Square Enix (2006). ファイナルファンタジーVII アドベントチルドレン ~Reunion Files~. SoftBank Creative. ISBN 9784797334982.
