= Shūhei Sakaguchi =

Japanese voice actor

- 阪口 周平
- Born: September 5, 1977 (age 49); Osaka Prefecture, Japan
- Occupation: Voice actor
- Years active: 1999–present
- Agent: Aksent

Shūhei Sakaguchi (阪口 周平, Sakaguchi Shūhei; born September 5, 1977) is a Japanese voice actor affiliated with Aksent. He is known for dubbing Lee Byung-hun and also voiced Narcistole in Delicious Party Pretty Cure.

== Filmography ==
=== Anime series ===
- Big Windup! (Riki Kajiyama, Takashima)
- Captain Tsubasa (Teppi Kisugi (youth))
- Cyberpunk: Edgerunners 2 (Meshuga)
- Delicious Party Precure (Narcistole)
- Digimon Fusion (Hideaki Mashimo)
- Dragon Quest: The Adventure of Dai (Apollo)
- Fairy Tail (Mest Gryder/Dranbalt)
- Fighting Beauty Wulong (Masao Ōba)
- Fullmetal Alchemist: Brotherhood (Mason)
- Gallery Fake (Detective)
- Great Pretender (Liu Xiao)
- Guilty Crown (Hirohide Nanba)
- I Left My A-Rank Party to Help My Former Students Reach the Dungeon Depths! (Vincent V)
- Ikkitousen (Kakouton Genjou)
- Inazuma Eleven (Jousuke Tsunami)
- Initial D (Hiroya Okuyama)
- Iron Man: Rise of Technovore (Clint Barton/Hawkeye)
- Itazura Na Kiss (Kinnosuke Nakamura)
- Junji Ito Collection (Tetsurō Mukoda)
- Marvel Anime: Iron Man (Kawashima)
- Midori Days (Gangster)
- Naruto: Shippuden (Jugo)
- One Piece (Shaka)
- Orb: On the Movements of the Earth (Grabowski)
- Oscar's Oasis (Harchi)
- Pani Poni Dash! (Narrator)
- Petals of Reincarnation (M. Nostradamus)
- Saiyuki Reload (Demon)
- Samurai Gun (Satoshi Ichigawa)
- SD Gundam Sangokuden Brave Battle Warriors (Choushuu Britova)
- Smile PreCure! (Yūichi Kise)
- The Aquatope on White Sand (Bondo Garandо̄)
- Tokyo Majin (Alan Claude)
- With You and the Rain (Hiura)
- Yaiba: Samurai Legend (Mr. Spider)
- Yakitate!! Japan (Kawachi)
- Yashahime: Princess Half-Demon (Goro)

=== Anime films ===
- Inazuma Eleven GO vs. Danbōru Senki W (2012) (Jousuke Tsunami)

=== Video games ===
| Year | Title | Role | Notes | Source |
|---|---|---|---|---|
| 2008 | Soulcalibur IV | Apprentice | | |
| 2009 | Little Anchor | Riheart Cloizer (リヒャルト・クロイツァー) | | |
| 2013 | Resident Evil 6 | Piers Nivans | Japanese dub | |
| 2014 | Infamous Second Son | Delsin Rowe | | |
| 2015 | Until Dawn | Josh | Japanese dub | |
| 2016 | Overwatch | Hanzo | Japanese dub | |
| 2019 | Days Gone | Arturo Jiminez | Japanese dub | |
| 2020 | Final Fantasy VII Remake | Biggs | | |
| 2020 | The Last of Us Part II | Owen | Japanese dub | |
| 2022 | Tactics Ogre: Reborn | Lanselot Hamilton | | |
| 2024 | Final Fantasy VII Rebirth | Biggs | | |
| 2025 | Xenoblade Chronicles X: Definitive Edition | Alois Bernholt (Al) | | |
| 2025 | Inazuma Eleven: Victory Road | Rei Tenguji | | |

=== Dubbing roles ===
==== Live-action ====
- Lee Byung-hun
  - G.I. Joe: The Rise of Cobra – Storm Shadow
  - I Come with the Rain – Su Dongpo
  - Masquerade – King Gwanghae/Ha-sun
  - G.I. Joe: Retaliation – Storm Shadow
  - Red 2 – Han Cho Bai
  - Terminator Genisys – T-1000
  - Inside Men – Ahn Sang-goo
  - The Magnificent Seven – Billy Rocks
  - The Age of Shadows – Jung Chae-san
  - Master – President Jin
  - The Fortress – Choi Myung-kil
  - Keys to the Heart – Jo-ha
  - Ashfall – Lee Joon-pyeong
- Chris Pine
  - Star Trek – James T. Kirk
  - Unstoppable – Will Colson
  - Star Trek Into Darkness – James T. Kirk
  - Horrible Bosses 2 – Rex Hanson
  - Jack Ryan: Shadow Recruit – Jack Ryan
  - Stretch – Karos
  - Z for Zachariah – Caleb
  - Star Trek Beyond – Captain James T. Kirk
  - Hell or High Water – Toby Howard
  - Outlaw King – Robert the Bruce
  - The Contractor – James Harper
- 5 Days of War (Thomas Anders (Rupert Friend))
- 90 Minutes in Heaven (Don Piper (Hayden Christensen))
- 90120 (Ethan Ward (Dustin Milligan))
- The Accountant (Braxton Wolff (Jon Bernthal))
- Aloha (Brian Gilcrest (Bradley Cooper))
- Alone in the Dark II (Edward Carnby (Rick Yune))
- American Sniper (Ryan "Biggles" Job (Jake McDorman))
- Army of Thieves (Brad Cage (Stuart Martin))
- Baggage Claim (Sam (Adam Brody))
- Barbarian (Keith (Bill Skarsgård))
- Bates Motel (Dylan Massett (Max Thieriot))
- Blades of Glory (James "Jimmy" MacElroy (Jon Heder))
- Breakthrough (Pastor Jason Noble (Topher Grace))
- Bullet Train (Yuichi Kimura / The Father (Andrew Koji))
- Bulletproof Monk (Kar (Seann William Scott))
- Chapter 27 (Mark David Chapman (Jared Leto))
- Chronicle (Matt Garetty (Alex Russell))
- The 1st Shop of Coffee Prince (Hwang Min-yeop (Lee Eon))
- Crime 101 (Ormon (Barry Keoghan))
- Criminal Minds (Luke Alvez (Adam Rodriguez))
- Crimson Peak (Dr. Alan McMichael (Charlie Hunnam))
- The Dangerous Lives of Altar Boys (Donny Flynn)
- Dead Man Down (Victor (Colin Farrell))
- The Double (Ben Geary (Topher Grace))
- Dr. Dolittle: Tail to the Chief (Cole Fletcher (Niall Matter))
- Dumbo (Neils Skellig (Joseph Gatt))
- East of Eden (Lee Dong-wook (Yeon Jung-hoon))
- Eight Legged Freaks (Bret (Matt Czuchry))
- Ender's Game (Peter Wiggin (Jimmy Pinchak))
- Fantastic Four (Victor von Doom / Doctor Doom (Toby Kebbell))
- The Gifted (Marcos Diaz / Eclipse (Sean Teale))
- Gilmore Girls (Jess Mariano (Milo Ventimiglia))
- Gossip Girl (Chuck Bass (Ed Westwick))
- Gotham (Oswald "Penguin" Cobblepot (Robin Lord Taylor), Jason Lennon/The Ogre (Milo Ventimiglia))
- Heroes (Peter Petrelli (Milo Ventimiglia))
- Hostel (Paxton (Jay Hernandez))
- Hostel: Part II (Paxton (Jay Hernandez))
- Hostel: Part III (Carter (Kip Pardue))
- I Am Number Four (Mark James (Jake Abel))
- iCarly (2007) (Spencer Shay (Jerry Trainor))
- iCarly (2021) (Spencer Shay (Jerry Trainor))
- The Illusionist (Eisenheim (Edward Norton))
- In Bruges (Eirik (Jérémie Renier))
- In the Name of the King (Basstian (Will Sanderson))
- Infamous Second Son (Delsin Rowe)
- The Internship (Graham Hawtrey (Max Minghella))
- Interview with the Vampire (2025 BS10 Star Channel edition) (Daniel Molloy (Christian Slater))
- Joy Ride 3: Roadkill (Jordon Wells (Jesse Hutch))
- Jumper (Griffin O'Connor (Jamie Bell))
- A Knight's Tale (William Thatcher (Heath Ledger))
- Let Him Go (Donnie Weboy (Will Brittain))
- Letters to Juliet (Charlie Wyman (Christopher Egan))
- The Little Things (Albert Sparma (Jared Leto))
- Love (Lee Miller (Gunner Wright))
- Lucifer (Detective Daniel Espinoza (Kevin Alejandro))
- Maleficent (Diaval (Sam Riley))
- The Mandalorian (The Mandalorian (Pedro Pascal)
- Mary Magdalene (Judas (Tahar Rahim))
- Mission: Impossible III (Rick Meade (Aaron Paul))
- Mr. Mercedes (Morris Bellamy (Gabriel Ebert))
- My Blind Date with Life (Max (Jacob Matschenz))
- The November Man (David Mason (Luke Bracey))
- Ouija (Trevor (Daren Kagasoff))
- Pathology (Dr. Ted Grey (Milo Ventimiglia))
- Platoon (2003 TV Tokyo edition) (Morehouse)
- Point Break (Johnny Utah (Luke Bracey))
- Pride and Prejudice and Zombies (Fitzwilliam Darcy (Sam Riley))
- Prince of Persia: The Sands of Time (Bis (Reece Ritchie))
- P.S. I Love You (Daniel Connelly (Harry Connick Jr.))
- Rambo (School Boy (Matthew Marsden))
- Ready or Not (Daniel Le Domas (Adam Brody))
- Really Love (Yusef Davis (Michael Ealy))
- Red Dawn (Matt Eckert (Josh Peck))
- Rise of the Planet of the Apes (Dodge Landon (Tom Felton))
- Secret Sunshine (Lee Min-ki (Kim Young-jae))
- Sense8 (Wolfgang Bogdanow (Max Riemelt))
- Suits (Alex Williams (Dulé Hill))
- Take Me Home Tonight (Kyle Masterson (Chris Pratt))
- Thor (Hawkeye (Jeremy Renner))
- Top Gun (2005 NTV edition) (LTJG Leonard "Wolfman" Wolfe (Barry Tubb))
- Torchwood (Ianto Jones (Gareth David-Lloyd))
- The Town (James "Jem" Coughlin (Jeremy Renner))
- Transformers: Revenge of the Fallen (Leo Spitz (Ramón Rodríguez))
- Twilight film series (Alec (Cameron Bright))
  - The Twilight Saga: Breaking Dawn – Part 2
  - The Twilight Saga: Eclipse
  - The Twilight Saga: New Moon
- The Unborn (Mark Hardigan (Cam Gigandet))
- Veronica Mars (Wallace Fennel (Percy Daggs III))
- Until Dawn (Josh Washington (Rami Malek))
- War for the Planet of the Apes (Preacher (Gabriel Chavarria))
- Wild Things: Foursome (Carson Wheetly (Ashley Parker Angel))
- Wind River (Cory Lambert (Jeremy Renner))
- Winter's Tale (Peter Lake (Colin Farrell))
- ZeroZeroZero (Manuel Quinteras (Harold Torres))

==== Animation ====
- Avengers Assemble (Scott Lang / Ant-Man)
- Batman Beyond (Willie Watt)
- Codename: Kids Next Door (Numbuh 5 / Abigail "Abby" Lincoln)
- Foster's Home for Imaginary Friends (Wilt)
- The Nut Job (Surly)
- ReBoot (Hack)
- Star Wars: Clone Wars (Sha'A Gi)
- Spider-Man: The Animated Series (Harry Osborn)
- Thor: Tales of Asgard (Fandral)
- X-Men: Evolution (Quicksilver, Berzerker)
