= Ryuji Mizuno =

Japanese voice actor (1952–2022)

- 水野 龍司
- Born: February 2, 1952; Gifu, Gifu Prefecture, Japan
- Died: September 12, 2022 (aged 70)
- Occupation: Voice actor
- Years active: 1970s–2022

Ryuji Mizuno (Japanese: 水野 龍司, Hepburn: Mizuno Ryuji) (February 2, 1952 – September 12, 2022) was a Japanese voice actor. He was best-known for voicing Giichi in Naruto and Julius in Berserk.

== Biography ==
Mizuno was born on February 2, 1952, in Gifu. He was a graduate of Nagoya University. Mizuno died of sepsis on September 12, 2022, at the age of 70.

== Filmography ==
- 1983: Tuesday Suspense Theater

=== Voice acting ===
- 1997: Virtua Fighter – Dr. Ivanoff
- 1997: B't X – B'T Radio
- 1997: Berserk – Julius
- 1999: Turn A Gundam – Meme Midguard
- 2001: Geisters: Fractions of the Earth – Soja
- 2002: Naruto – Giichi
- 2003: Kino's Journey – Old Man A
- 2003: Last Exile – Graf
- 2004: Tales of Phantasia: The Animation – Minister
- 2005: Last Order: Final Fantasy VII – Commander
- 2006: Tokko – Taishi
- 2006: Death Note – Shussekisha B
- 2008: Spice and Wolf – Kizoku
- 2010: Tegami Bachi – Danchou
- 2010: Naruto: Shippûden – Gilchi
- 2017: Lu Over the Wall – Nodoguro
- 2018: Zombie Land Saga – Master

=== Dubbing ===
- The Bridge on the River Kwai – Captain Reeves (Peter Williams)
- Die Hard with a Vengeance (1999 TV Asahi edition) – Detective Joe Lambert (Graham Greene)
- Downfall – Joseph Goebbels (Ulrich Matthes)
- Falling Down – Mr. Lee (Michael Paul Chan)
- The Last Shot – Marshal Paris (Tim Blake Nelson)
- Riding in Cars with Boys – Mr. Leonard Donofrio (James Woods)
- Shaolin Soccer – Team Evil's Striker (Shik Zi-yun)
- The Virgin Suicides – Mr. Lisbon (James Woods)
