= Characters of the Final Fantasy VII series =

Tetsuya Nomura's designs of the main playable characters in the original Final Fantasy VII game. Clockwise from top right: Cait Sith, Tifa, Barret, Cloud, Aerith, Yuffie, Red XIII, Vincent and Cid.

Starting with Advent Children, the cast of Final Fantasy were redesigned in order to look more realistic and fit following generations consoles.

Final Fantasy VII, a role-playing video game developed by Square, now Square Enix, and originally released in 1997, features many characters in both major and minor roles. VII has been followed by multiple sequels and prequels, grouped into the multimedia series Compilation of Final Fantasy VII. These include the 2004 mobile game prequel Before Crisis, the 2005 film sequel Advent Children, the 2006 shooter spin-off sequel Dirge of Cerberus, and the 2007 action game prequel Crisis Core. Other media include spin-off books and the original video animation Last Order. The setting of Final Fantasy VII has been described as industrial or post-industrial science fiction. It is referred to as "the Planet" in most games, and was retroactively named "Gaia" in some Square Enix promotional material.

VII follows Cloud Strife, a mercenary with a troubled past who joins eco-terrorist group AVALANCHE to stop Shinra from draining the life of the Planet and using it as an energy source. As the story progresses, conflicts escalate and the group fights for the world's safety as new forces emerge. Cloud and his team eventually face off against the game's antagonist, Sephiroth, to stop him from destroying the Planet. Other important characters include Aerith Gainsborough, a flower seller who becomes a good friend to Cloud; Zack Fair, Cloud's friend, a former soldier of Shinra and the protagonist of Crisis Core; and Vincent Valentine, a man made immortal as a result of Shinra's experiments and the protagonist of Dirge of Cerberus. The conflict between Cloud and Sephiroth forms the core narrative around which many of the series' stories are built. Other characters include the Turks, a covert group which originally worked for Shinra.

The original characters were designed by Tetsuya Nomura, who had done monster designs for Final Fantasy VI and was chosen for the role after his designs impressed producer Hironobu Sakaguchi. Nomura was responsible for many of the characters and their stories. The scenario for the original game was written by Sakaguchi, Yoshinori Kitase and Kazushige Nojima. Nomura, Kitase and Nojima have been involved in other titles in the Compilation. The characters of VII have met with positive reception in contemporary and modern reviews, while their portrayal in the Compilation titles has been mixed: while Crisis Core was generally praised, the focus on secondary characters in Dirge of Cerberus drew mixed opinions from some, while their appearance in Advent Children was generally cited as confusing or poor for newcomers to the series. The cast, along with side characters and villains, have remained popular among critics and series fans, with many lists and opinion polls citing them as some of the best characters in the Final Fantasy series.

== Concept and creation ==
The original concept for Final Fantasy VII's world was for a modern setting, but after the project was moved from the Super Nintendo Entertainment System to the PlayStation console, the setting was altered. Elements from the original concept were later used in Final Fantasy VIII and Parasite Eve. The game's producer, Hironobu Sakaguchi, chose character designer Tetsuya Nomura, who had previously worked on monster designs for Final Fantasy VI, to design the main cast. Sakaguchi chose Nomura after being amused by the way Nomura did the storyboarding for the cutscenes. Talking of his role as character designer, Nomura stated that when he was brought on, the main scenario was incomplete, but he "went along like, 'I guess first off you need a hero and a heroine', and from there drew the designs while thinking up details about the characters. After [he'd] done the hero and heroine, [he] carried on drawing by thinking what kind of characters would be interesting to have. When [he] handed over the designs [he'd] tell people the character details [he'd] thought up, or write them down on a separate sheet of paper". Nomura also created Zack Fair, who was a late addition to the cast meant to add depth to Cloud and Aerith's relationship, and came up with the name for Red XIII, wanting an "interesting" name that combined a color and a number. Although the game was Nomura's favorite Final Fantasy project, he felt that it was hindered by graphical limitations, and that as a result his designs were plain in comparison to his "true" style. Final Fantasy VII was the first game where Nomura was really involved in the character design, including the personalities, so the player side ended up being edgy as well. He wanted to include a unique character, resulting in a diverse party.

The game's plot was created by Sakaguchi, although most scenario writing was done by Yoshinori Kitase and Kazushige Nojima, who conceived Shinra, Cloud and Sephiroth's relationship, and Cloud's backstory. The Lifestream, the source of life for the Planet, was one of the earliest concepts created for VII, but its depiction and purpose changed drastically during development. The concepts behind the Lifestream and Aerith's iconic death scene were sparked in Sakaguchi by the death of his mother, which inspired him to create a realistic death for Aerith rather than a "Hollywood" sacrificial death.

The "dark" theme described by Nomura is continued throughout the Compilation, with characters such as Kadaj, Loz and Yazoo in Final Fantasy VII: Advent Children and the Tsviets in Dirge of Cerberus: Final Fantasy VII. Kitase stated that voice acting was one of the topics which the Compilation team paid close attention to. As Cloud and Vincent have similar personalities, care was taken to differentiate between them and their dialogue. The compilation was originally conceived as only one title (Advent Children), which focused on Tifa and Cloud, but they eventually expanded it into a collection which included games focusing on other characters, such as Zack and Vincent. Nomura requested Hajime Tabata, the director of Before Crisis, to create a game focusing on the Turks.

With Advent Children following works, the cast was redesigned. While designing the characters, the staff discovered that it was impossible to translate the Final Fantasy VII designs into the film. Therefore, some identifying characteristics had to be discarded. Cloud's redesign was a combination of eight different designs, from his super deformed appearance in the game to his more realistic appearance in the film. The difficulties in making Sephiroth led the staff to reduce his appearances in the film; it took them two years to develop and refine his look. Nozue also struggled to develop a framework for Tifa's body that was "balanced, yet showed off her feminine qualities". For Dirge of Cerberus, the Tsviets were designed with the idea of creating a sense of balance for the warriors with which players would already be familiar, primarily Vincent, Cloud and Sephiroth. Meanwhile, the prequel Crisis Core operated on the principle of dealing with these characters' "younger days", so that new elements could be added without changing them too much. One of the primary reasons Zack was chosen as the protagonist was because his fate was predetermined. The addition of Genesis to the story came about after discussions between producer Hideki Imaizumi and the character's Japanese voice actor, Gackt. Imaizumi had been impressed with the characters' brief appearance in the secret ending to Dirge of Cerberus: Final Fantasy VII, and felt there was potential to expand on the character. Sephiroth's role was specifically written to give him a more human side. Rather than using the character models and graphical style of Advent Children, which by that point had been developed using ten-year-old technology, the team decided to create new designs and models: Nomura wished to balance the realism of Advent Children with cartoon stylization. Nomura was in charge of the revamped main character designs, while designer Roberto Ferrari was in charge of designs for secondary characters. Character modeling was supervised by Visual Works, Square Enix's CGI development branch. Cloud's initial redesign for Final Fantasy VII Remake departed more dramatically from the original, but was later altered to more closely resemble Nomura's original concept. Tifa's original appearance was changed to make her look more realistic, as members from the staff realized her design would not fit fight scenes. Sephiroth appears during the Midgar scenario, despite not being properly introduced until a flashback Cloud experiences. Vice noted that Cloud sees the future of Aerith in the original 1997 game, leaving her fate unknown to returning fans. The main characters were adjusted in various ways for Remake. Rather than the "cool and collected" portrayal of Cloud seen in other games, Remake depicts his apathetic attitude as a façade to mask his insecurities. Nojima wanted to convey that his standoffishness could be seen as lame, and worked hard to make the interactions between the three natural. In addition to returning characters, the team decided to expand the role of minor characters and write new characters.

=== Voice actors ===
Teruaki Sugawara, the voice director behind Kingdom Hearts, recommended Takahiro Sakurai, Cloud's Japanese voice actor, to Nomura for the role. Nomura had originally asked Sakurai to play the protagonist of The Bouncer, Sion Barzahd, but found that his voice best suited Cloud after hearing him speak. Sakurai received the script without any accompanying visuals, and first arrived for recording under the impression that he would be voicing a character other than Cloud. As a sequel to the highly popular Final Fantasy VII, Sakurai felt greater pressure performing the role than he did when he voiced Cloud for Kingdom Hearts. The Japanese voice actors remained the same, with Sakurai being surprised by this younger take on Cloud, having not voiced in the original PlayStation video game. Sakurai performed alongside Ayumi Ito, who voiced Tifa, for a few scenes. These recordings left him feeling "deflated", as the "exchanges he has with Tifa can be pretty painful", Sakurai commenting that Cloud—whom he empathized with as his voice actor—has a hard time dealing with straight talk. Nomura wanted Cloud and Vincent's voices to contrast with each other due to their similar personalities. He felt Vincent was older and more mature than Cloud, and as a result, he cast Shōgo Suzuki, who has a very low voice. Nomura had wanted Zack to have a "nice, upbeat voice", which influenced his decision to cast Kenichi Suzumura.

In English adaptations, Cloud is voiced by Steve Burton. Burton was first hired to voice Cloud once a man behind Square saw his work in the 2001 film The Last Castle. Rachael Leigh Cook stated in an interview for Kingdom Hearts II that she enjoys playing Tifa and described her as "very strong physical and emotionally, but also very sensitive" and as "very multi-dimensional". In voicing the character, Cook listened to Ito's recording as a guide to how the character sounds. Following Advent Children, Cook thanked Nomura for the film he created, as she enjoyed it. Mena Suvari explained that Aerith was given a mothering feel with an ephemeral presence.

For the English dub of Remake, Cody Christian (Cloud) commented on him being Burton's replacement, stating, "Steve, you paved the way. You made this character what it is and have contributed in shaping a legacy" and that he did not want to let Burton down with his take on the character. For the next installment, Christian said that the character differed from Remake as he aimed to explore more his sensitive side like his past or intimate relationships he is often involved. John Eric Bentley voiced Barret and did research in order to properly voice him. He was aided by the translators for the Japanese version, who gave him the context of the scenes he had to record. For him, one of the biggest challenges in his work was "representation", claiming that Barret was more than a one-dimensional character.

== Playable characters ==
=== Cloud Strife ===
Voiced by:

English: Steve Burton (2002-2018), Cody Christian (2020-present)
Japanese: Takahiro Sakurai

Cloud Strife (クラウド・ストライフ, Kuraudo Sutoraifu) is the protagonist of Final Fantasy VII, Final Fantasy VII: Advent Children, the Final Fantasy VII Remake series, and a recurring character through the Compilation. In Final Fantasy VII, he is a mercenary employed by the eco-terrorist organization AVALANCHE. He claims to be a former member of SOLDIER, but over the course of the plot he rediscovers lost memories of his true self.

=== Barret Wallace ===
Voiced by:

English: Beau Billingslea (Advent Children and Dirge of Cerberus), John Eric Bentley (Remake series)
Japanese: Masahiro Kobayashi (2005-2023), Mahito Funaki (2024-present)

Barret Wallace (バレット・ウォーレス, Baretto Wōresu) is the former leader of the eco-terrorist group AVALANCHE, who is opposed to Shinra's use of Mako technology since he believes it to be killing Gaia. He is also the adoptive father of Marlene, the daughter of his deceased friend, Dyne. Initially, he distrusts and dislikes Cloud, believing him to be nothing more than a heartless mercenary-for-hire, but eventually changes his opinion of him. After AVALANCHE disbands, Barret chooses to continue his mission to save the Planet by trying to find a new energy source to replace Mako.

=== Tifa Lockhart ===
Voiced by:

English: Rachael Leigh Cook (2006-2018), Britt Baron (Remake series)
Japanese: Ayumi Ito

Tifa Lockhart (ティファ・ロックハート, Tifa Rokkuhāto; originally romanized as "Tifa Lockheart") is a childhood friend of Cloud. She is one of the lead members of AVALANCHE, and initially convinces Cloud to join them in their rebellion against Shinra. She helps to unlock Cloud's missing memories when they fall into the Lifestream together, and she is the only one who knows of Cloud's past. Tifa appears in all the Compilation of Final Fantasy VII titles alongside Cloud.

=== Aerith Gainsborough ===
Voiced by:

English: Mandy Moore (Kingdom Hearts), Mena Suvari (Advent Children, Kingdom Hearts II), Andrea Bowen (2008-2019), Briana White (Remake series)
Japanese: Maaya Sakamoto

Aerith Gainsborough (エアリス・ゲインズブール, Earisu Geinzubūru; originally romanized as "Aeris Gainsborough") is a resident of Midgar who works as a flower peddler on its streets. She is sought after by Shinra's research department because she is the last of the Cetra, also known as the Ancients, and Shinra believes she is the key to finding the fabled Promised Land. She meets Cloud during the first reactor mission, and later on he became her bodyguard. Despite Sephiroth killing her during the events of VII, Aerith's spirit retains her cognitive powers and individuality within the Lifestream.

=== Red XIII ===
Voiced by:

English: Liam O'Brien (Advent Children), Max Mittelman (Remake series)
Japanese: Masachika Ichimura (Advent Children), Kappei Yamaguchi (Remake series)

Red XIII (レッドXIII, Reddo Sātīn; pronounced "Red Thirteen"), birth name Nanaki (ナナキ), is a powerful and intelligent member of an unnamed feline species with the ability to speak. In Final Fantasy VII, he temporarily joins Cloud's team after they rescue him from Hojo at the Shinra building. Red XIII believed that his father, Seto, was a coward who abandoned their home, Cosmo Canyon, during a war with the Gi Tribe. However, upon returning to Cosmo Canyon, his adoptive grandfather, Bugenhagen, brings Red XIII to Seto's petrified body and reveals that he sacrificed himself to save the village and fought against the invading army. After learning the truth, Red XIII gains the courage to permanently join Cloud's group. Red XIII makes additional appearances throughout the Compilation. In Before Crisis, he defends a female of his species named Deneh and is subsequently captured by the Turks. In the On the Way to a Smile novella "Case of Nanaki", Red XIII struggles with the knowledge that he will outlive his friends. He also appears briefly in Advent Children and Dirge of Cerberus; in the former, he aids in the fight against Bahamut SIN, and in the latter he is seen resting with Shelke during the ending. In Final Fantasy VII Lateral Biography Turks -The Kids Are Alright-, he saves a young girl from drowning and briefly encounters Tseng.

Red XIII was the fourth character to be created by Nomura, who wanted a quadrupedal playable character in the cast despite the graphical difficulties it would pose. He was originally conceived as a member of SOLDIER. His standard name, "Red XIII", was thought up by Nomura during the concept stage because he wanted something that did not sound like a normal name. The final name came from combining the character's hair color with the number 13, an unlucky number. His real name, Nanaki, was chosen by other staff members. The name Nanaki was chosen due to its Native American sound, which linked with Red XIII's theme and backstory. Nomura gave Red XIII tattoos and a general Native American motif; his tail having a flame at its the tip was to add more color. Red XIII's limited appearance in Advent Children was due to difficulties with accurately animating his hair realistically. For his action scenes, four separate CGI layers had to be created and overlapped.

=== Yuffie Kisaragi ===
Voiced by:

English: Christy Carlson Romano (Kingdom Hearts, Advent Children), Mae Whitman (2006–2019), Suzie Yeung (Remake series)
Japanese: Yumi Kakazu

Yuffie Kisaragi (ユフィ・キサラギ, Yufi Kisaragi) is the daughter of the leader of Wutai, who feels her country has lost its former glory in the aftermath of a war with Shinra and has become a resort town. Yuffie is introduced when she ambushes Cloud and his allies in either the Gongaga jungle or the forests south of Junon, where she is known as "Mystery Ninja". If the player defeats her in combat and then chooses the correct series of dialogue choices, she introduces herself and joins the player's party. However, once in Wutai Village, Yuffie steals the party's Materia and hides, but is kidnapped by the lecherous Don Corneo, a Midgar crime lord. When the group rescues Yuffie, she returns the stolen Materia and continues working with the party.

=== Cait Sith ===
Voiced by:

English: Greg Ellis (Advent Children and Dirge of Cerberus), Paul Tinto (Rebirth)
Japanese: Hideo Ishikawa

Cait Sith (ケット・シー, Ketto Shī) is a robotic talking cat. In Final Fantasy VII, he rides atop an unnamed robotic Moogle; in later installments in the Compilation of Final Fantasy VII, he either walks by himself or rides Red XIII. As a robot, he can be rebuilt and replaced and is controlled by Reeve Tuesti, whose original intent during Final Fantasy VII was to infiltrate Cloud's group and sabotage their resistance efforts on behalf of his Shinra employers. After having a change of heart, he decides to help the group, even risking his life by destroying a version of himself to extract the Black Materia Sephiroth needs to summon the Meteor spell. He appears briefly in Advent Children and Final Fantasy VII Remake and as a supporting character throughout Dirge of Cerberus.

=== Vincent Valentine ===
Voiced by:

English: Steve Blum (Advent Children and Dirge of Cerberus), Matthew Mercer (Rebirth)
Japanese: Shōgo Suzuki

Vincent Valentine (ヴィンセント・ヴァレンタイン, Vinsento Varentain) is an optional party member in Final Fantasy VII, and the protagonist of Dirge of Cerberus and its mobile spin-off. Cloud and the others discover him sleeping inside a coffin in the basement of the Shinra Mansion, where he joins them in their quest to hunt down Sephiroth. Vincent reveals little about himself after his introduction, and his backstory is explored in Dirge of Cerberus and other Compilation of Final Fantasy VII titles.

=== Cid Highwind ===
Voiced by:

English: Chris Edgerly (2006-2019), J. Michael Tatum (Rebirth)
Japanese: Kazuhiro Yamaji

Cid Highwind (シド・ハイウインド, Shido Haiuindo) is an airship pilot. He is first encountered trying to restart a rocket program which Shinra cancelled due to the actions his assistant Shera took out of concern for the safety of the rocket. He blames Shera for the incident as he does not believe her concerns were justified, and verbally abuses her. However, her concerns regarding the oxygen tanks are proven to be correct when an explosion temporarily traps Cid during a later successful attempt to launch the rocket against Meteor. As a result, Cid comes to forgive her. Cid also appears in Before Crisis, Advent Children and Dirge of Cerberus. In Advent Children, he briefly rejoins the party to fight against Bahamut SIN. In Dirge of Cerberus, he aids the World Regenesis Organization in launching an attack on Deepground headquarters, and later in fighting Omega WEAPON.

=== Zack Fair ===
Voiced by:

English: Rick Gomez (2006-2018), Caleb Pierce (Remake series)
Japanese: Kenichi Suzumura

Zack Fair (ザックス・フェア, Zakkusu Fea) is a minor character in Final Fantasy VII who appears in flashbacks; he is the protagonist of its prequel, Crisis Core. He also appears in the Compilation of Final Fantasy VII titles Before Crisis, Last Order and Advent Children. He is the romantic hero to Aerith's heroine, and part of the mystery of Cloud's true identity.

=== The Turks ===
The Turks (タークス, Tākusu) are a group of covert operatives who work for Shinra throughout VII and later become an independent force. While part of Shinra, they were officially known as the Investigation Sector of the General Affairs Department. In Final Fantasy VII, several Turks serve as recurring antagonists, although they are not above forming temporary alliances with the game's group of central characters. They are also the playable characters and protagonists of the Final Fantasy VII prequel, Before Crisis, which focuses on their actions in the years leading up to the events of the original game. The player chooses from eleven unnamed Turks, each with his or her own backstory, personality, strengths and weaknesses. With one exception, each Turk is identified based on their weapon and sex. Among the important Turks in the series are:

==== Reno and Rude ====
Voiced by:

English: Quinton Flynn and Crispin Freeman (respectively, Advent Children and Crisis Core), Arnie Pantoja and William Christopher Stephens (respectively, Remake series)
Japanese: Keiji Fujiwara (Reno, 2006-2024), Taiten Kusunoki (Rude)

Reno (レノ) and Rude (ルード, Rūdo), two of the original Turks from VII, are originally portrayed as antagonists working with Shinra against AVALANCHE. In Advent Children, they aid Cloud and his friends, while glimpses of their earlier days with Shinra are portrayed in Before Crisis and Crisis Core.

==== Elena ====
Voiced by:

English: Bettina Bush (Advent Children), Piper Reese (Rebirth)
Japanese: Megumi Toyoguchi

Elena (イリーナ, Irīna) is the newest member of the Turks. She is inexperienced and clumsy, but takes her job seriously. She appears as an antagonist in VII and a minor character in Advent Children.

==== Tseng ====
Voiced by:

English: Ryun Yu (Advent Children and Crisis Core), Vic Chao (Remake series)
Japanese: Junichi Suwabe

Tseng (ツォン, Tson) is the leader of the Turks after Verdot leaves the Turks in the aftermath of Sephiroth's attack on Nibelheim. He is initially portrayed as an antagonist in VII, but appears as an ally in Crisis Core and as a minor character in Advent Children.

==== Cissnei ====
Voiced by:

English: Carrie Savage (Crisis Core), Kayli Mills (Remake series)
Japanese: Asumi Nakada

Cissnei (シスネ, Shisune), real name unknown, is a member of the Turks. She appears as a playable character in Before Crisis and a supporting character in Crisis Core. She bears the codename Shuriken (Female) (手裏剣 (女), Shuriken (Onna)) while using the alias "Cissnei." While she was not featured in the original Final Fantasy VII, in Rebirth she is shown to have joined the relief effort in Gongaga while secretly still working for Shinra.

==== Verdot ====
Verdot (ヴェルド, Verudo), alternately called Veld, is the former leader of the Turks. He was originally a loyal member, but falls out of favor with the company during the struggle against AVALANCHE, which includes bungled operations and the company trying to use the Turks as cannon fodder. Verdot eventually resigns from his position after learning that his daughter, who he thought was dead after a bungled Shinra operation, is still alive under the name "Elfé". While he is declared an enemy of Shinra and seemingly killed, he is in fact spirited away with his daughter to live life in peace.

==== Legend (Male) ====
Legend (Male) (レジェンド(男), Rejendo (Otoko)), a Turk who is one of the main characters of Before Crisis. He is generally known under the moniker of "Legendary Turk", and formally an anti-Shinra activist known as "Death God of the Battlefield". He is recruited into the Turks by Verdot, and while he leaves the Turks for some time, he returns after Verdot resigns.

== Antagonists ==
=== Sephiroth ===
Voiced by:

English: Lance Bass (Kingdom Hearts), George Newbern (2006-2018), Tyler Hoechlin (2020-2024), Travis Willingham (2027)
Japanese: Toshiyuki Morikawa

Sephiroth (セフィロス, Sefirosu) is the main antagonist of Final Fantasy VII and Advent Children. He was originally a member of Shinra's SOLDIER elite, but he went insane after learning his true origins. This prompts him to abandon his humanity and attempt to attain godhood by absorbing the Lifestream, the source of life on the planet. He, remotely controlling parts of Jenova's body taking on his appearance, manipulates and tortures Cloud over the course of Final Fantasy VII, and kills Aerith at the Forgotten City. Cloud ultimately destroys him at the end of the game, but he returns in Advent Children after being reborn, only to be defeated again by Cloud. Sephiroth also appears in almost every title in the Compilation of Final Fantasy VII.

=== Jenova ===
Jenova (ジェノバ, Jenoba) is an extraterrestrial lifeform who crash-landed on the planet two thousand years prior to the events of VII, and is portrayed in multiple titles in the Compilation as a female humanoid. When Jenova originally crashed, she began infecting the Cetra with a virus, causing them to almost be wiped out. However, a small group managed to seal Jenova in a tomb, which was later excavated by Shinra. Jenova was mistaken for a Cetra, and samples from her remains were used in the experiments that created SOLDIER and Sephiroth. In both Final Fantasy VII and Advent Children, Sephiroth and Jenova aim to take control of the planet and use it to roam through space until they find another world to build on. In Advent Children, Jenova's remains are acquired by Rufus, which the Remnants hope to use to resurrect Sephiroth. Jenova is also responsible for the disease Geostigma, which infects those who came into contact with the tainted Lifestream after Sephiroth was defeated.

Jenova's original forms during VII's development were very different from her final incarnation; the original Jenova was a hostile region of the brain that would awaken in people possessing certain genes. The name "Jenova" was to have been inherited by a book written by the Cetra on the subject. While Jenova's remains in Advent Children are called a "head", this is not technically accurate, as the term was used because developers could not think of a more suitable name. One of the ideas discussed for Sephiroth's resurrection was for the remnant to eat Jenova's remains. The disease caused by Jenova's presence in the Lifestream, Geostigma, was based on a discarded concept for Final Fantasy X.

=== Rufus Shinra ===
Voiced by:

English: Wally Wingert (Advent Children), Josh Bowman (Remake series)
Japanese: Tōru Ōkawa

Rufus Shinra (ルーファウス神羅, Rūfausu Shinra) is the former Vice President of Shinra, who is promoted to president after his father is killed by Sephiroth. He is depicted as callous, cunning and ruthless during much of Final Fantasy VII, and his attitude towards how the Shinra Company should be run causes his father to attempt to bar him from controlling the company. As shown in Before Crisis, Rufus was anonymously supplying information to AVALANCHE with the intent of having them kill his father, but this plan failed and he is placed under house arrest. However, following his father's death, he claims control over the company and begins running it his way. He later leads Shinra's efforts to find the Promised Land, as well as Shinra's military in battling the WEAPONs. Rufus was thought to have died when his office in Shinra Headquarters was hit by an energy blast from Diamond WEAPON, but Advent Children reveals that he survived but was greatly injured. The On the Way to a Smile novella "Case of Shinra" depicts his survival, as well as his plans for the future and how he contracts Geostigma.

He appears in Advent Children in possession of Jenova's remains and claiming that he intends to repair the damage Shinra had caused to Gaia. In Advent Children, Rufus uses a wheelchair and covers himself with a white sheet, but these are later shown to be a façade while he was holding Jenova's remains. While not seen in Dirge of Cerberus except in a flashback, it is hinted that he is secretly funding the WRO (World Regenesis Organization).

=== Professor Hojo ===
Voiced by:

English: Paul Eiding (Dirge of Cerberus and Crisis Core), James Sie (Remake series)
Japanese: Nachi Nozawa (Dirge of Cerberus, Last Order and Crisis Core), Shigeru Chiba (Remake series)

Professor Hojo (宝条, Hōjō) is the biological father of Sephiroth and was the head of Shinra's "Department of Science and Research" until he resigned after being attacked by Red XIII at Shinra headquarters. While studying Jenova, he infused his unborn child with its cells; the result of this was Sephiroth, who grew up to have some control over Jenova. His experiments were responsible for making Vincent immortal. In Final Fantasy VII, Hojo is defeated by Cloud and his allies while trying to aid Sephiroth's plans. In Dirge of Cerberus he survived long enough to store a digital copy of himself in the worldwide network; he subsequently takes control of Weiss' body and attempts to summon Omega WEAPON to drain the Lifestream from the Planet and launch into space in search of a new world. He is stopped by Vincent with the help of Nero, who merges with Weiss and frees him from Hojo's control, destroying Hojo in the process. Hojo also briefly appears in Before Crisis, Last Order, and Crisis Core.

=== Kadaj, Loz, and Yazoo ===
Voiced by:

English: Steven Staley (Kadaj), Fred Tatasciore (Loz), Dave Wittenberg (Yazoo)
Japanese: Showtaro Morikubo (Kadaj), Kenji Nomura (Loz), Yuji Kishi (Yazoo)

Kadaj (カダージュ, Kadāju), Loz (ロッズ, Rozzu) and Yazoo (ヤズー, Yazū) are the antagonists of Final Fantasy VII: Advent Children. Known as "Remnants", they are manifestations of Sephiroth's will, driven to find samples of their "mother" Jenova to trigger Sephiroth's resurrection and enact vengeance upon the world. The three frequently come into conflict with the remains of Shinra as well as Cloud. Eventually, Kadaj is successful in merging with Jenova's cells, triggering Sephiroth's resurrection. After a final duel between Cloud and Sephiroth, Kadaj dies in his arms, while Loz and Yazoo die in a final attack on Cloud.

The Remnants were created to represent different aspects of Sephiroth's personality: Kadaj represented his cruelty, Loz represented his strength, and Yazoo represented his allure. To fit in with the film's theme of the "next generation", they were made younger than Cloud and Sephiroth. Kadaj's original moniker during production was "Lost Name".

=== Deepground ===
Deepground (ディープ グラウンド ソルジャー, Dīpu Guraundo Sorujā; Deepground Soldier) is a military force created by Shinra using genetic engineering to be a covert force, which acts as the antagonist of Dirge of Cerberus. They are led by the Tsviets, an elite who were infused with genetic material from Genesis Rhapsodos. The Tsviets' original leaders, the Restrictors, were overthrown when the Tsviets used one of their own who had yet to be fully indoctrinated to kill their leader. During the events of Dirge of Cerberus, Hojo possesses their leader and manipulates them into attempting to awaken OMEGA, a means for the Lifestream to escape the planet during times of catastrophe. Although one of the members, Shelke, is rescued from the group, the others are killed, although Weiss' body is rescued by Genesis and transported somewhere. The Tsviets are:

- Weiss the Immaculate (純白の帝王ヴァイス, Junpaku no Teiō Vaisu; lit. "Weiss the Immaculate White Emperor"), leader of the Tsviets and Nero's elder brother. While controlled by Hojo for most of the game, he ultimately acts as the game's true antagonist. Weiss is voiced in Japanese by Jōji Nakata and in English by Dave Boat in Dirge of Cerberus and Daman Mills in the Final Fantasy VII Remake series.
- Nero the Sable (漆黒の闇ネロ, Shikkoku no Yami Nero; lit. "Nero the Jet-Black Darkness"), a member of the Tsviets and Weiss' younger brother. He has the power to control darkness, and prior to the events of Dirge of Cerberus, he was kept in close confinement because his power was highly dangerous. Nero is voiced in English by Mike Rock in Dirge of Cerberus and Sean Chiplock in the Final Fantasy VII Remake series, and by Ryōtarō Okiayu in Japanese.
- Azul the Cerulean (蒼きアスール, Aoki Asūru), a physically imposing member who acts as Shalua's handler. He first appears in Before Crisis as a SOLDIER candidate who attracted Shinra's attention and was indoctrinated into Deepground. Azul is voiced by Brad Abrell in English and Tesshō Genda in Japanese.
- Rosso the Crimson (朱のロッソ, Aka no Rosso), a sadistic member of the group who was mentally damaged by the Deepground training program. She succeeds in extracting the Protomateria needed to activate the OMEGA weapon from Vincent's body. Rosso is voiced by Mary Elizabeth McGlynn in English and Atsuko Tanaka in Japanese.
- Shelke the Transparent (無色のシェルク, Mushiki no Sheruku; lit. "Shelke the Expressionless (Colorless)") is the youngest member of the group and the younger sister of Shalua Rui. She was kidnapped when she was nine years old and experimented on, which gave her the ability to send her consciousness into the Planet's worldwide network. However, it also mentally scarred her and trapped her in a child's body that needs constant Mako injections to stay alive. Shelke is voiced by Kari Wahlgren in English and Fumiko Orikasa in Japanese.

=== Genesis Rhapsodos ===
Voiced by:

English: Robin Atkin Downes (Dirge of Cerberus), Oliver Quinn (Crisis Core), Shaun Conde (Crisis Core Reunion)
Japanese: Gackt

Genesis Rhapsodos (ジェネシス ・ラプソードス, Jeneshisu Rapusōdosu) is first seen in Dirge of Cerberus and acts as the main antagonist of Crisis Core. He was a product of the same program that created Sephiroth, but was not as stable as Sephiroth and began suffering from a degenerative process called "degradation" after being wounded during a sparring match with Sephiroth and Angeal. Allying with a rogue Shinra scientist named Hollander, Genesis fights against the company while seeking a way to stop his degradation using Sephiroth's stable cells. Eventually, Genesis is defeated by Zack, then cured of degradation by the Lifestream. Genesis was taken in by Deepground, who gave him the codename "G" and used him to create the Tsviets. Refusing to follow along with the Tsviets' plans after their rebellion, he seals himself in a cave until he is needed. In the secret ending of Dirge of Cerberus, Genesis awakes, determined to defend the planet.

Genesis was modeled on the character's Japanese voice actor, singer Gackt, who composed and performed "Redemption" for Dirge of Cerberus. While originally intended as a minor character, Hideki Imaizumi, the producer of Crisis Core, found such a passing use of a character to be a waste and asked Gackt whether he was interested in further involvement. Gackt was eager to continue with the character, and ended up being one of the key creative minds behind Genesis' manners and personality. Genesis' outfit became one of Gackt's commonly worn outfits during concerts.

== Other characters ==
=== AVALANCHE ===
AVALANCHE (アバランチ, Abaranchi) is an eco-terrorist organization in the world of Final Fantasy VII. It is introduced as the main rebel force against Shinra, being openly opposed to the company's Mako-based energy production, which is draining the planet of its Lifestream. Two versions of the organization existed: the first acted as the antagonists of Before Crisis, while the second featured many of the protagonists of VII. While the first version was indirectly destroyed by the actions of their leader, Shinra eventually crushed the movement and destroyed Sector 7 of Midgar. Among its notable members were:

- Fuhito (フヒト), the scientific brains of AVALANCHE and the main antagonist of Before Crisis. He holds a warped view of how humans are harming the Planet, and comes to believe that they must be destroyed for the planet to heal properly. To do this, he seeks the power of Zirconiade, a powerful summoned monster. While he is successful in summoning Zirconiade, the summon and Fuhito are defeated by the Turks and he is killed by Shears.
- Elfé (エルフェ, Erufe) is the leader of AVALANCHE, later revealed to be Verdot's lost daughter Felicia (フェリシア, Ferishia). She was originally thought dead in a bungled operation during which her mother died and her town was destroyed, but was in fact taken to a Shinra facility and experimented on by Hojo, who implanted the Zirconiade materia into her body. While saved from death, she and her father are apparently shot by the Turks on orders from Shinra. However, the shooting was in fact a bluff to allow Elfé and Verdot to escape and live in peace.
- Shears (シアーズ, Shiāzu), AVALANCHE's second-in-command. He is intensely loyal to Elfé and distrustful of Fuhito, and is quick to see that Fuhito only wants to use Elfé after learning of the Materia within her. He allies with the Turks to save Elfé, and eventually sacrifices himself to destroy Fuhito.
- Biggs (ビッグス, Biggusu) and Wedge (ウェッジ, Wejji) are AVALANCHE members who worked with Barret and Cloud to infiltrate and destroy one of the Mako Reactors. In the original game, they are killed while trying to defend Sector 7's pillar. In Remake, Wedge is found alive in an underground lab under Sector 7, but disappears during the Shinra Tower raid after being attacked by Whispers. Rebirth reveals that the Whispers made Wedge die in a similar fashion to the original game. Biggs is seen in the final cutscene, alive and recovering. In Rebirth, Biggs ends up in the same timeline as Zack after his death was also prevented and is tracked down by Zack at Marlene's behest, questioning his existence and purpose after his comrades' deaths. Despite Zack's help, Biggs ends up getting killed by Shinra soldiers. Biggs and Wedge are voiced in English by Gideon Emery and Matt L. Jones respectively in Final Fantasy VII Remake and in Japanese by Shūhei Sakaguchi and Takayuki Asai respectively.
- Jessie (ジェシー, Jeshī) is a member of AVALANCHE and a colleague/friend of Biggs and Wedge, who is involved in the destruction of the Mako Reactor and is killed during the same incident. In Final Fantasy VII Remake, she has the surname "Rasberry". It is revealed that her motive for being part of AVALANCHE is that her father succumbed to Mako poisoning while working for Shinra and was left in a coma. She also has various flirtatious interactions with Cloud. In Final Fantasy VII Remake, she is voiced in English by Erica Lindbeck and in Japanese by Satomi Moriya.

=== Reeve Tuesti ===
Voiced by:

English: Jamieson Price (Advent Children and Dirge of Cerberus), Jon Root (Remake series)
Japanese: Banjō Ginga

Reeve Tuesti (リーブ・トゥエスティ, Rību Tuesuti) is the former head of Shinra's "Department of Urban Development", and the controller of the robotic cat Cait Sith. In Final Fantasy VII, Reeve originally worked against AVALANCHE until deciding to aid them in their quest against Sephiroth: feeling repentant about his role, he aids the group through Cait Sith. He is temporarily arrested after Rufus' apparent death, but is released in time to organize an evacuation of Midgar's population before the arrival of Meteor. He also informs Elmyra Gainsborough, Aerith's adoptive mother, of her death. Reeve plays a minor role in Before Crisis, as the architect responsible for designing Mako reactors and aiding the Turks through Cait Sith. He is not seen in Advent Children, but is heard leaving a message on Cloud's cell phone. He plays a significant role in Dirge of Cerberus, where he establishes the World Regenesis Organization, which is dedicated to restoring the Planet. He also appears in the On the Way to a Smile novella "Case of Denzel" and its OVA adaptation On the Way to a Smile - Episode: Denzel.

=== Marlene ===
Voiced by:

English: Grace Rolek (Advent Children), Ariel Winter (Advent Children Complete), Brielle Milla (Remake series)
Japanese: Miyū Tsuzurahara (Advent Children), Sumire Morohoshi (Advent Children Complete), Otoha Umezaki (Remake series)

Marlene (マリン, Marin) is the young daughter of Barret's friends, Dyne and Eleanor, and the adopted daughter of Barret. Eleanor was killed by an attack from Shinra prior to the events of Final Fantasy VII, and Dyne assumes Marlene to be dead as well. Barret adopts her thinking Dyne is dead, but later encounters Dyne, who has gone insane. After fighting Barret, Dyne entrusts Marlene to Barret's care and commits suicide. For most of Final Fantasy VII, Marlene is left in the care of Elmyra, Aerith's adoptive mother. During Advent Children, Marlene lives with Cloud, Tifa, and Denzel, while Barret is searching for a new power source for the Planet. She later helps Cloud return to his friends and fight against Sephiroth's Remnants.

=== Shalua Rui ===
Voiced by:

English: Kim Mai Guest
Japanese: Yuu Asakawa

Shalua Rui (シャルア・ルーイ, Sharua Rūi) is a minor character in Before Crisis and a supporting character in Dirge of Cerberus. When her sister Shelke was taken by Shinra for their Deepground unit, she went in search of Shelke and joined AVALANCHE in hopes that they would lead her to her sister. During her time there, she received grave injuries, resulting in the loss of her right eye and arm and massive internal damage. This incident prompted her to leave AVALANCHE for good. In Dirge of Cerberus, she is part of the World Regenesis Organization, and is responsible for saving Vincent after he is overcome by the power of Chaos. She is eventually sent into a coma while she is helping Vincent and Shelke escape and her life support mechanism, her artificial arm, is destroyed, with her fate being unknown.

=== Angeal Hewley ===
Voiced by:

English: Josh Gilman (Crisis Core), Bill Millsap (Crisis Core Reunion)
Japanese: Kazuhiko Inoue, Tomoaki Maeno (Ever Crisis, young)

Angeal Hewley (アンジール・ヒューレー, Anjīru Hyūrē) is a SOLDIER 1st Class who is Zack Fair's friend and mentor and a close friend of Genesis and Sephiroth; he is also the original owner of the Buster Sword, and passed down the sword to him. He was produced by the same project that birthed Genesis, and after learning of his origins, he turns against Shinra and works with Genesis for a time. As he begins suffering from the same degradation as Genesis, he begins seeing himself as a monster and leaves Genesis, temporarily allying with Zack. Zack is eventually forced to fight and kill him, but Angeal lives on for some time through Lazard Deusericus, the former director of SOLDIER who is made a copy of him, and an animal-like copy; both die after protecting Cloud from a Shinra attack in Banora.

=== Lucrecia Crescent ===
Voiced by:

English: April Stewart
Japanese: Rio Natsuki

Lucrecia Crescent (ルクレツィア・クレシェント, Rukuretsia Kureshento) is a Shinra scientist introduced in VII and an important character in Dirge of Cerberus. She worked in Nibelheim under Hojo and worked on the research into Chaos, which she injected into Vincent while he was a Turk assigned to protect her, and provided the maternal DNA for Sephiroth. Ridden with guilt over her actions, she seals herself inside a crystal, essentially becoming immortal and cut off from the outside world. Her memories are uploaded into Shelke, and through them and recordings left behind for him, she is able to communicate with Vincent, eventually leaving a final message that she is glad he survived.

Lucrecia was originally a minor character in VII. It was hard for the staff to recreate her for Dirge of Cerberus, as they needed to rely on low-detail concept art and in-game models. To create a new model for Lucrecia, the concept team used Sephiroth's appearance as a base, deciding that the latter would have a maternal rather than paternal resemblance.

=== Denzel ===
Voiced by:

English: Benjamin Bryan (Advent Children), Aaron Refvem (Advent Children Complete)
Japanese: Kyosuke Ikeda (Advent Children), Kazumu Izawa (Advent Children Complete)

Denzel (デンゼル, Denzeru) is a young boy who resides with Cloud, Tifa, and Marlene in the city of Edge. He first appears in Advent Children as one of many people who contracted Geostigma. He and many other sick children are lured to the Ancient City of the Cetra, where they are brought under Kadaj's control. Denzel regains his senses after Tifa protects him from Bahamut SIN during the final conflict. He is later healed of his Geostigma through the water in Aerith's church.

== Reception ==
=== Critical reception ===
The characters of VII received near-unanimous praise from critics for their original appearance. In an article on GameSpot, it was stated that, despite the premise not being unique, it was "Cloud's interactions with other characters, especially between him and [Sephiroth] which make the story so special". Thierry Nguyen of Computer Gaming World found that both the story and character development were strong, saying that as the players progressed through the game, "these characters intrigue you, and you get so attached to them that you might jump as a reaction to a shocking event on the first disc. Final Fantasy VII evokes that kind of emotional response". Steve Bauman of Computer Games Magazine called the characters "funky", saying that the characters "worked wonders" on some of the poorer dialogue. Simon Parkin of Eurogamer praised the characters' "clear motivations, desires and flaws". RPGFan generally praised the characters, especially Cloud, Tifa and Sephiroth, and said that "while on the surface they certainly do appear to fit certain stereotypes, a second look will reveal that they transcend these qualities and are compelling and complex personalities underneath".

While the mobile game Before Crisis, the first Compilation game title to be released, has received limited western commentary, writers at AnimeFringe felt that "the chance to reverse the good and bad guy roles should be welcomed by many". Advent Children received mixed views from critics. Carlo Santos of Anime News Network felt that, due to the film's pace and context, viewers were not given enough time to get to know the characters. These sentiments were echoed by John Eriani of Mania Entertainment, who particularly faulted the lack of character names or explanations of the villains' motives. Chris Carle of IGN was critical of the lack of motivation for those who were not familiar with the series, but praised both the English and Japanese voice acting. Michael Beckett of RPGamer, while generally less than impressed by the overall story, said that it "[provides] some interesting insights into a few of the less-developed characters of the game, though Cloud receives most of the attention and development as the story unfolds".

Opinions on the characters of Dirge of Cerberus were again mixed. IGN's Jeremy Dunham was fairly positive, saying that the new characters "go through quite a bit of development and even some of the old ones have a chance to shine". He was also pleased with Vincent's portrayal and development in the title. Rob Fahey of Eurogamer felt that the focus on characters that were secondary or optional in the original was a weak point of the game, and that those not familiar with the original game would possibly feel lost. GameSpot's Greg Mueller praised the game's focus on Vincent's origins and development, despite finding the large number of new characters a little confusing. Crisis Core's characters were generally praised. GameSpot's Kevin VanOrd said that, despite new and familiar characters appearing, it was the further-explored characters of Zack and Sephiroth that he found himself sympathising with: "The way their personal stories weave in and out of each other—and set the stage for the events in Final Fantasy VII—makes Crisis Core not just the finest role-playing experience available on the PSP, but also one of the best Japanese RPGs in years". Ryan Clements, writing for IGN, was pleased by the story's focus on Zack and his interactions with other characters rather than a grand narrative. Gerard Villorria of GameSpy was also positive, saying that exploring the relationships between old characters was "a key element", while finding the new characters and their backstories "equally interesting".

In regards to remake, IGN called its "emotional arcs". Despite noting his antisocial attitudes in the remake, IGN and GameSpot commented that Cloud is the character who has the most notable arc in Remake, with Cody Christian's performance helping to improve his appeal. The idea that there are four characters with Sephiroth's name led VG247 to note the remake still had its own mysteries that original players would not understand while the title. Siliconera described this incarnation of the antagonist as haunting, due to how he often appears within Cloud's hallucinations across the plot. Still, the site noticed that despite being a remake, the game explored different situations of the narrative similar to the films known as Rebuild of Evangelion that also retold an anime but with multiple changes. The portrayal of the supporting characters also earned positive response such as the potential Barret was given to develop him in the sequel or Aerith's traits and some ambiguous scenes involving her.

In the book The World of Final Fantasy VII: Essays on the Game and Its Legacy, Cloud is also seen as a Messiah with Tifa and Aerith being one of his main supporters to help progress and defeat Sephiroth, though the end of the narrative has Cloud appreciating the victory thanks to his "pillars". While Cloud is never addressed as a God, he instead has to protect God's peace as Sephiroth instead plays the role of Satan as well as his own Shadow with Cloud having to surpass him in the narrative.

=== Legacy ===
The characters of Final Fantasy VII and the Compilation have remained highly popular, often being cited as some of the best characters in both the Final Fantasy series and video games in general by both critics and fans. Reader and critic lists on gaming site IGN have all placed them high, with one reader poll in 2014 having multiple VII characters dominating a list of the top ten characters in the series as a whole. Sephiroth remains one of the most popular villains in video game history, unanimously voted number one by the staff of Electronic Gaming Monthly in their "Top 10 Video Game Bosses" list in October 2005. In late 2007, Dengeki PlayStation named Cloud Strife the best character of all time in their retrospective awards feature about the original PlayStation. Aerith placed fifth, Tifa placed eighth and three other characters placed in the top 50; Sephiroth at fourteenth, Reno at fifteenth, and Yuffie at forty-second. Cloud placed second in a Famitsu reader poll for Japan's favorite video game character. In a list of the best Final Fantasy characters made by Complex, characters from Final Fantasy VII occupied seven out of the twenty places, with Sephiroth and Cloud coming third and first respectively. The character of Cloud has also influenced character design in the series, having had a profound influence on the design and portrayal of Lightning, the central protagonist of Final Fantasy XIII and its sequels.
