= Last Order: Final Fantasy VII =

2005 anime film by Morio Asaka

- Promotional artwork featuring Zack (front), Sephiroth (middle), and Jenova (back)

ラストオーダー -ファイナルファンタジーVII- (Rasuto Ōdā -Fainaru Fantajī Sebun-)
- Original video animation
- Directed by: Morio Asaka
- Produced by: Masao Maruyama; Jungo Maruta; Akio Ofuji
- Written by: Kazuhiko Inukai; Kazushige Nojima
- Music by: Takeharu Ishimoto
- Studio: Madhouse
- Licensed by: Sony Pictures Home Entertainment
- Released: September 14, 2005
- Runtime: 25 minutes

Last Order: Final Fantasy VII, (Note: Japanese: ラストオーダー -ファイナルファンタジーVII-, Hepburn: Rasuto Ōdā -Fainaru Fantajī Sebun-) also abbreviated as Last Order or LO, is a 2005 Japanese original video animation (OVA) produced by Madhouse and released by Square Enix. It was directed by Morio Asaka, and produced by Masao Maruyama, Jungo Maruta and Akio Ofuji. Tetsuya Nomura served as supervising director. The OVA is an alternate rendition of two flashbacks which were first seen in the 1997 video game Final Fantasy VII. Last Order was released in Japan with Advent Pieces: Limited, a special edition release of the film Final Fantasy VII: Advent Children, and as a bonus feature in the North American "Limited Edition Collector's Set" release.

Last Order is associated with the Compilation of Final Fantasy VII, a series of prequels and sequels to the original Final Fantasy VII. Although not an official Compilation installment, Last Order has nonetheless been included in official guidebooks. The OVA's soundtrack was released with the music of Before Crisis, and select songs were later remixed for Crisis Core. Last Order was created due to the success of promotional commercials for Before Crisis, with production lasting six months. The plot encompasses two events occurring before the events of Final Fantasy VII. One follows Sephiroth destroying a village, and the other follows Zack Fair and Cloud Strife escaping from the Shinra Electric Power Company. These flashbacks are narrated by the Turks leader Tseng. Originally meant to focus on Zack, Last Order highlighted Tseng's feelings and position in the Shinra company. Last Order received negative fan response due to differences from the original game's content, and the Crisis Core game designers avoided recreating certain scenes from Last Order.

== Background ==
Last Order explores situations shown and referenced within Final Fantasy VII and other Compilation titles. The world of Final Fantasy VII, referred to as "the Planet", is dependent for its survival on a flow of spirit energy called the Lifestream. The megacorporation Shinra eventually rises to power and begins extracting the Lifestream through mako reactors, killing the Planet. Shinra uses Mako as an energy source and to manipulate the strength and abilities of their paramilitary organization, SOLDIER. Sephiroth, considered the strongest member of SOLDIER, is sent to investigate a Mako reactor in the secluded town of Nibelheim and is accompanied by the SOLDIER Zack and two grunts, one of whom is Cloud. While there, Sephiroth spends most of his time reading in the Shinra Mansion, which had previously been used by the Shinra scientist Hojo to conduct experiments. Through Hojo's log books, Sephiroth comes to learn of his past, in which he was injected with Jenova's cells. The Planet had once been inhabited by the Cetra (or "Ancients"), who were almost completely destroyed by Jenova, an extraterrestrial lifeform that crashed onto the Planet 2,000 years previously, and began infecting the Cetra with a virus. When Jenova was unearthed by a Shinra science team, it was mistakenly identified as a Cetra. This caused Sephiroth to believe he was also a Cetra, and that humans had betrayed his ancestors.

== Plot ==
Sephiroth impales Cloud and hangs him over the reactor core.

After killing the villagers of Nibelheim, Sephiroth goes to the mako reactor facility, and incapacitates Tifa and Zack. As Sephiroth reunites with Jenova, Cloud ambushes him. Sephiroth impales Cloud and escapes with Jenova. Hojo and the soldiers arrive, and take Zack and Cloud for science experimentation, during which Cloud succumbs to mako poisoning. Zack later escapes with the unconscious Cloud and is ambushed by the Shinra military en route to Midgar.

== Cast ==
- Kenichi Suzumura as Zack Fair: a 1st class SOLDIER. He protects Cloud from Shinra. The production crew used Last Order "to portray Zack properly" as light-hearted and young. Suzumura noted Zack felt more "alive" in comparison to his appearance in Advent Children.
- Takahiro Sakurai as Cloud Strife: a Shinra infantryman and a survivor of Nibelheim.
- Toshiyuki Morikawa as Sephiroth: a 1st class SOLDIER. He betrays Cloud, Tifa, and Zack.
- Junichi Suwabe as Tseng: the leader of the Turks who narrates the OVA. Originally, it was intended to focus on Zack, but Tseng became the "real highlight". Last Order elaborates on Tseng's changing feelings towards his job, as well as where he places his moral values.
- Ayumi Ito as Tifa Lockhart: a resident of Nibelheim and childhood acquaintance of Cloud.
- Hiroshi Fujioka as Zangan: Tifa's martial arts instructor. He escorts her to safety after Sephiroth destroys the village.
- Keiji Fujiwara as Reno and Taiten Kusunoki as Rude: A duo of Turks agents under Tseng's command.
- Nachi Nozawa as Professor Hojo: the head of Shinra's science department. He takes Zack and Cloud for experiments, and dismisses Tseng's group of agents.

Other roles include Daisuke Namikawa as Turk (Rod), Ginpei Sato as Turk (Two Guns), Hōchū Ōtsuka as Turk (Martial Arts), Mayuko Aoki as Turk (Shotgun), and Megumi Toyoguchi as Turk (Gun); together, they are group of agents under Tseng's command who previously appeared in Before Crisis. Keiji Okuda, Atsushi Imaruoka, Ryuji Mizuno, and Daisuke Kirii voice members of Shinra's military unit, who attempt to apprehend Cloud and Zack. Yōhei Tadano and Katsuhisa Hōki voice villagers of Nibelheim.

== Production and release ==
Last Order was released in the collector's set of Final Fantasy VII: Advent Children in North America.

Last Order: Final Fantasy VII was produced and scripted by Square Enix collaboration with Madhouse and directed by Morio Asaka. The decision to create Last Order arose from the positive reaction towards a popular promotional clip created by Madhouse for the game Before Crisis. Madhouse was chosen to produce the OVA partly because of their success with the clip and because the president of Madhouse was very enthusiastic about the project. However, the main reason for choosing Madhouse was that the company "understood the significance" of making a Final Fantasy VII animation, as it was considered a large responsibility to animate "the most popular game" in the Final Fantasy series. Tetsuya Nomura, the character designer for the Final Fantasy VII series and co-director of Advent Children, acted as the supervising director. He had the right to reject or accept concept drawings for Last Order. As a result, Nomura had a large quantity of images redrawn, to the extent that "the entire production was in jeopardy".

Production lasted six months. The production crew considered the most challenging part of creating the OVA to be making "Nomura's drawings move on screen". Because Last Order was hand-drawn, the crew faced difficulties creating uniform lines. Another issue was the overall feel of each scene; original drawings were done by several artists, resulting in various scenes having different styles. Producer Akio Ofuji explained that they "wanted to make sure the final product was of very high quality, so [they] worked with the production company day and night, straight through to the deadline". Nomura and Ofuji agreed that many scenes showing important events and feelings in Final Fantasy VII had been fragmented and disjointed, and so they had decided that those scenes would be the subject of Last Order, giving the audience of Advent Children (the film Last Order was released with) a "more enjoyable understanding". They used the film as an opportunity to portray Zack "properly" as a "handsome, light-hearted man [who] was in everyone's memory". Last Order also details Tseng's growth and his feelings towards his both job and events depicted, wherein he attempts to "get his own ideas of justice heard" but later abandons his moral values "in order to carry out a cruel mission". Ofuji commented that "those are the kind of scenes we wanted people to be more aware of".

Last Order was originally released in Japan with the "Ultimate Edition" of the Advent Children film, Advent Pieces: Limited, on September 14, 2005. The OVA was included in the North American "Limited Edition Collector's Set" of Advent Children, released by Sony Pictures Home Entertainment on February 20, 2007. The North America release did not come with an English dub and the OVA is subtitled. Last Order was not included in the release of Final Fantasy VII: Advent Children Complete, a 2009 director's cut of Advent Children with extra footage.

The Compilation of Final Fantasy VII is a series of prequels and sequels to the original Final Fantasy VII game. Last Order is not part of the Compilation of Final Fantasy VII and is considered an outside work. However, it has been associated with the Final Fantasy VII series since its creation, and is mentioned alongside official installments in official guidebooks and companion books. Like Last Order, Dirge of Cerberus Lost Episode: Final Fantasy VII (a mobile phone spin-off of Dirge of Cerberus) is an outside work associated with the Compilation.

=== Music ===
Last Order's score was composed, arranged, and produced by Takeharu Ishimoto, including the ending theme "Last Order". The music was combined with the music from Before Crisis on a single soundtrack and released in Japan on December 19, 2007. The soundtrack was later made available in North America by Square Enix. Tracks 13 through 27 on the disc contain the score from Last Order, while tracks 1 through 12 contain music from Before Crisis. Select tracks on the soundtrack of Crisis Core contain music and remixes of music from the OVA.

OverClocked ReMix's four-disc tribute album, Voices of the Lifestream, has a disc entitled Order. The name was chosen to coincide with Last Order, and the music is themed after it.

== Response and cultural impact ==
Only 77,777 copies of Advent Pieces: Limited were produced in Japan, and they are no longer available, having been sold out months in advance of its release. They retailed for ¥29,500, or US$300, each while the North American collector's edition retailed for $49.95.

Overall, Last Order garnered positive feedback from Western critics. Chris Carle of IGN noted that Last Order was "the true meat of the new extras [in the Advent Children collector's set]… a traditionally animated chapter for Final Fantasy fans that centers on the story of Zack and Cloud" and that "it adds even more dimension to the story [of Final Fantasy VII]". Todd Douglass Jr. from DVD Talk called Last Order "the real reason to check out the Limited Edition release for Advent Children" and commented that as "a long-time anime fan and lover of Final Fantasy", he "was enthralled by every minute to be had in Last Order". However, Hideki Imaizumi, the producer of Crisis Core, stated that they had received "considerable negative feedback" from fans, who were displeased with changes made to the Nibelheim event in Last Order. Due to this, the scene was redone for Crisis Core, and the production crew was careful to avoid making the same decisions.
