= Vincent Valentine =

Final Fantasy VII character

- Final Fantasy character
- Vincent Valentine artwork by Tetsuya Nomura for Final Fantasy VII
- First appearance: Final Fantasy VII (1997)
- Designed by: Tetsuya Nomura
- Voiced by: English: Steven Blum (2005–2006); Matthew Mercer (2024–present); Japanese: Shōgo Suzuki (2005–present); Kazuhiro Nakata (Ehrgeiz)

In-universe information
- Weapon: Firearms

Vincent Valentine (ヴィンセント・ヴァレンタイン, Vinsento Varentain) is a character in Square's (now Square Enix) 1997 role-playing video game Final Fantasy VII. He is designed by Tetsuya Nomura, and also appears in various titles from the Compilation of Final Fantasy VII, a metaseries set in the Final Fantasy VII continuity. He is the protagonist of the 2006 third-person shooter Dirge of Cerberus: Final Fantasy VII and its mobile phone tie-in Dirge of Cerberus: Lost Episode. Vincent is voiced in Japanese by Shōgo Suzuki and in English by Steve Blum and Matthew Mercer.

In the backstory to Final Fantasy VII, Vincent is a Turk assigned to protect the scientist Lucrecia Crescent, whom he has slowly fallen in love with. After a series of scientific experiments involving the cells of the extraterrestrial lifeform Jenova, Crescent gives birth to the game's main antagonist, Sephiroth, with Professor Hojo being his father, but soon after, Vincent became a test subject to experiments performed by Hojo after he was shot by him. During their heated dispute over the danger posed to Lucrecia and her unborn child, a frustrated Hojo drew a gun and shot Vincent directly in the chest. This resulted in genetic modification that supplanted other forms within him and gave him superior strength, speed, and healing in addition to not aging. If the player finds Vincent, he will join Cloud Strife's group to stop Sephiroth and seek revenge on Hojo.

Due to time constraints, Vincent was originally not intended to be playable in Final Fantasy VII, but was ultimately made an optional character. Despite his optional status and lack of concrete detail regarding his background, he proved to be popular with both fans and critics, and his history was expanded upon in other installments of the Compilation, primarily Final Fantasy VII: Advent Children and Dirge of Cerberus.

== Concept and design ==
Character designer Tetsuya Nomura explained that Vincent's character shifted from that of horror researcher to detective, to chemist, and finally to the figure of a former Turk with a tragic past. Director Yoshinori Kitase was in charge of the cutscene, in which Vincent joined the party, while scenario writer Kazushige Nojima wrote his backstory. Nojima struggled with writing Vincent's dialogue, as he rarely speaks. In the original script of the game, Vincent was introduced similarly but had a handsome and sarcastic personality. He would join Cloud's group after learning they were in pursuit of Hojo, but was unaware of the results of the experimentation he was subjected to. Additionally, he would be privy to information regarding Shinra's involvement with the creation of Sephiroth. He would explain to Cloud the story of Sephiroth's origins. When the game was in development, Nomura and his staff considered removing Vincent and Yuffie Kisaragi since they did not have enough time to work them into the story properly. As a result, Vincent and Yuffie were made optional party members.

Vincent's Japanese voice actor, Shōgo Suzuki, explained that he tries "to hold back as much emotion as possible when playing Vincent", noting that Vincent is "a bit of a loner" and "appears cold on the surface". Nomura wanted Cloud and Vincent's voices to contrast with each other due to their similar personalities. He felt Vincent was older and more mature than Cloud, and as a result, he cast Suzuki, who has a very low voice. In the English dub, Vincent was voiced by Steve Blum, as the casting staff wanted a man who portrays Vincent's brooding manner based on his dark past. Blum was overjoyed because he claims to be a fan of the original Final Fantasy VII, and stated that directors wanted him to portray Vincent as "dark and moody" since Vincent is a "tortured soul".

Vincent's cape took many adjustments to perfect for Advent Children, and his gun was transformed to reflect his new role as the protagonist for Dirge of Cerberus.

Vincent is a tall, lean man with long black hair and bright red eyes who wears a ragged red cloak and mantle over a black leather suit, as well as a metallic, golden claw gauntlet on his left forearm. Vincent's cloak covers the lower half of his face and is held closed by a series of buckles. His crimson cloak was added to symbolize the idea of him carrying a heavyweight connected to death. While other characters were given simple costumes in Advent Children, Vincent was given a more complex outfit. Nomura felt that changing his design to something complicated would "conflict with his personality", which is relatively straightforward. So he was given attire consisting of "various, complex parts". His cloak was difficult to animate due to it being organic; the overall complexity of Vincent's design led to his scenes being "especially hard to create". These scenes were constantly being adjusted so as "to convey [their] elusive nature of seemingly having shape, but not". These adjustments concluded six months before the film's completion.

However, Vincent was chosen to be the main protagonist of Dirge of Cerberus due to his strong connections to the setting of Final Fantasy VII and the potential for expanding on his background. Due to the staff's desire to make Dirge a shooter, Vincent was also chosen because of his weaponry, while his transformations into different monsters in the original Final Fantasy VII was something the staff wanted to work into the gameplay. For the game, Nomura redesigned Vincent's gun in the same way that Cloud's Buster Sword was redesigned for Advent Children, to demonstrate that he is the protagonist of the game. The gun was named Cerberus (ケルベロス, Keruberosu) in reference to the monster from Greek and Roman mythology; the gun has three barrels, like how Cerberus has three heads.

== Appearances ==
=== Final Fantasy VII ===
In the game, Vincent is an optional party member. Players can unlock Vincent by the halfway point of Final Fantasy VII, when Cloud Strife and his allies find him sleeping in a coffin in the basement of Shinra Mansion in Nibelheim. Cloud mentions his quest to stop the game's antagonist, Sephiroth, who Vincent recognizes as the son of Lucrecia Crescent. Vincent joins the group after learning that they may eventually meet up with Professor Hojo, whom he has an unexplained vendetta against. Later, Vincent finds Lucrecia inside a cave, and his backstory is partly revealed. Vincent was a member of the Turks, an elite group of Shinra agents. While serving as Lucrecia's bodyguard, he would slowly fall in love with her, but she ultimately decided to remain faithful to Hojo, who persuaded her to use her unborn baby in his experiments. When protesting the nature of these experiments, Vincent was shot by Hojo, who proceeded to experiment on him. This resulted in him not aging and having the ability to transform into various monsters. Vincent felt strong guilt over being unable to protect Lucrecia, leading to his separation. Overcome by guilt, Lucrecia sealed herself away in a Mako crystal. Upon entering the cave in the game, Lucrecia is revived and asks Vincent if Sephiroth is still alive, but he lies and tells her that he is dead.

=== Compilation of Final Fantasy VII ===
In Before Crisis, which is set six years prior to Final Fantasy VII, Vincent is seen in his Turk attire conversing with Veld, the leader of the Turks, and helps him obtain some Materia needed for a mission. In the film Advent Children, which is set two years after Final Fantasy VII, Vincent rescues Cloud from Kadaj and his gang and reveals to him Kadaj's intentions to merge with the remaining Jenova cells and resurrect Sephiroth. Vincent later helps Cloud and his allies defeat the summoned creature Bahamut SIN. In the On the Way to a Smile novella "Case of Nanaki", which is set between the original game and Advent Children, Vincent encounters his former comrade Red XIII (Nanaki), who is fearful that he will soon be alone due to his lifespan being much longer than humans. Vincent explains to Red that he is immortal and promises to meet with him every year to prevent his loneliness.

In Dirge of Cerberus, which takes place one year after Advent Children, Vincent is now working with Reeve Tuesti and the World Regenesis Organization to eliminate the organization Deepground, who have targeted Vincent because he carries "Protomateria" (エンシェントマテリア; Enshentomateria) inside his body, with Lucrecia having implanted it in him after he was shot by Hojo. The purpose of the Protomateria was to enable Vincent to control the Chaos (カオス, Kaosu) gene, which Lucrecia injected him with to save his life. The Protomateria is eventually ripped from his body by Rosso the Crimson, leading to Vincent being unable to control Chaos. Eventually, he confronts the Deepground leader, Weiss the Immaculate, who is possessed by the digitalized mind of Hojo. Hojo reveals that his plan is to awaken Omega WEAPON, who will absorb the Lifestream and leave the Planet, resulting in the death of all living things. After Omega's awakening, the renegade Deepground member, Shelke, returns the Protomateria to Vincent, and he is once again able to control of Chaos, using it to destroy Omega. The mobile game Dirge of Cerberus Lost Episode takes place during Dirge of Cerberus and features Vincent as the main protagonist.

He appears in Final Fantasy VII Rebirth.

=== Other appearances ===
Outside the Final Fantasy VII series, Vincent appears in the fighting game Ehrgeiz as an unlockable character, with his Turk uniform as an alternate costume. Like the other Final Fantasy VII characters in the game, Vincent does not serve a role in the main storyline. Although he was meant to appear in Kingdom Hearts, his design was instead used as the basis for Cloud's redesign. Vincent's popularity has seen merchandise related to the character, including the release of action figures. Vincent also appears in Super Smash Bros. Ultimate as a spirit.

== Reception ==
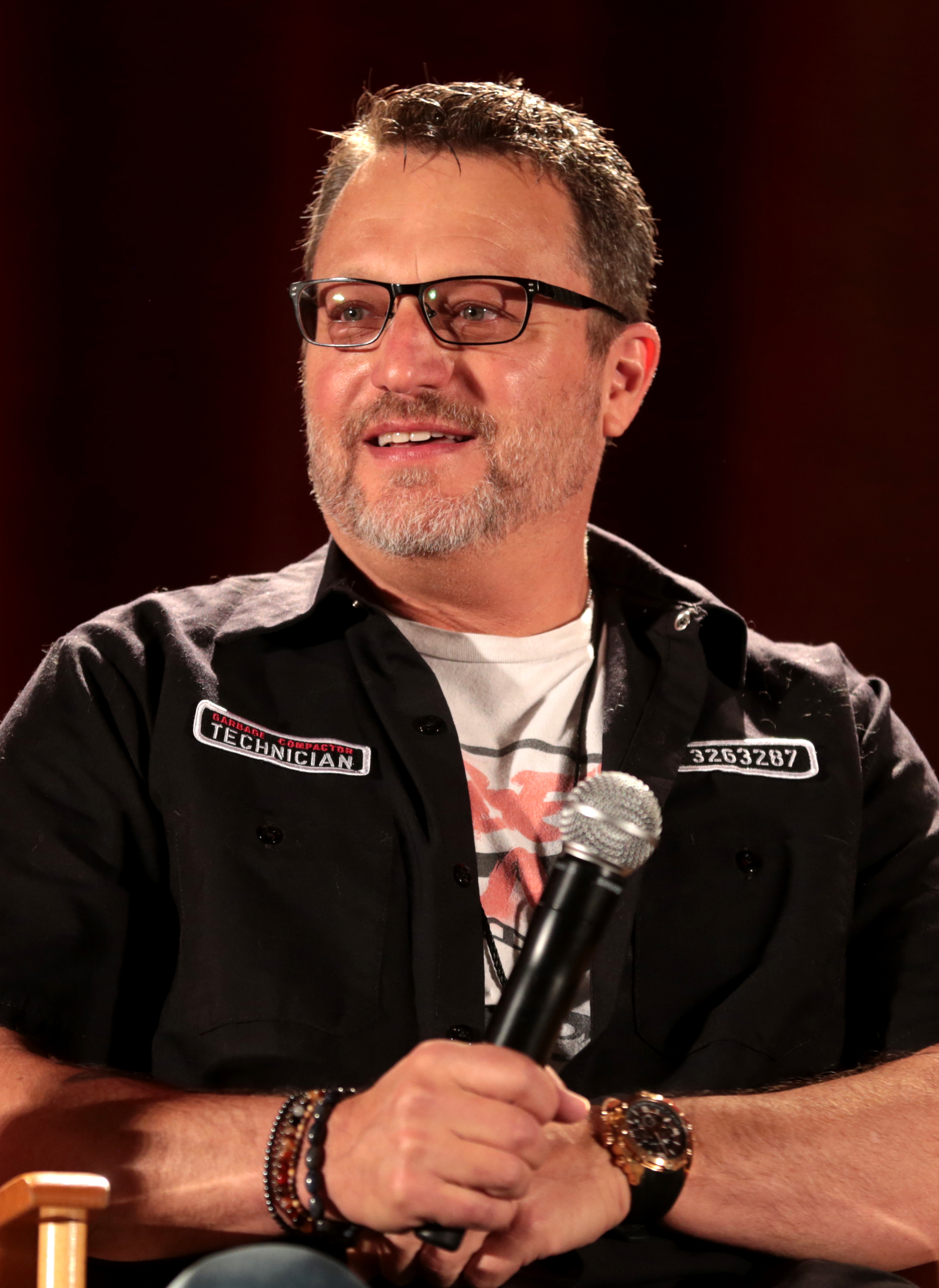
Steve Blum was praised for his performance as Vincent.

The character has received mixed comments from video game publications. Magazines have also described him as one of the best Final Fantasy character. In GameSpot's article "The History of Final Fantasy", Vincent was comically referred to as the Final Fantasy VII character who female players found to be "the most alluring undead man they've ever met". IGN has praised for his "striking" character design, as well as the fact that "FFVII's 3D engine made his shapeshifting Limit Breaks some surprisingly scary stuff". He has been held as an example of the recurring character categories of "The Kickass Quiet Guy" by 1UP.com and "The Brooding Pretty Boy" by GamesRadar+. DiehardgameFan said that Vincent's design is invoking of vampires but does not pass such standards that gaming vampires are famous for as he is instead called an undead or an experiment.

There was also commentary about Vincent's appearances in his spin-off. GameSpot writer Greg Mueller regarded Vincent as one of "the more interesting characters from Final Fantasy VII" and liked how Dirge of Cerberus was focused on him and explained his origins more clearly. His character design and abilities have been praised by GameSpy's Justin Speer, who felt that with such traits he "capably steps into a leading role" of Dirge of Cerberus. IGN's Jeremy Dunham had a similar opinion, noting that Vincent "is exposed pretty convincingly here". Eurogamer's Rob Fahey criticized Vincent for not being familiar enough to players, even to those who played the original Final Fantasy VII, to warrant his role as protagonist in Dirge of Cerberus. However, Fahey still recognized him as a very popular character, commenting that he is one of the most common characters from Final Fantasy VII to be featured in fan fiction and fan art. Although RPGamer's Michael "CactuarJoe" Beckett said that Vincent was one of the "less well-developed" characters from Final Fantasy VII, he found his development in Dirge of Cerberus to be satisfying. According to' GamesRadar+, Dirge of Cerberus focused on developing Vincent due to his lack of backstory in Final Fantasy VII, and regarded the mobile phone spin-off as "Vincent fan service instead of FFVII canon". Steve Blum's performance as Vincent achieved a positive response from fans and the media.

GamesRadar+ claimed that they look forward to the character's debut in the remake installments of Final Fantasy VII as the first volume still did not focus on him. GamesRadar was disappointed that Vincent's role in Rebirth would not be as active as in the original game, comparing him to the early inclusion of Red XIII as AI controlled rather than playable.

== See also ==
- List of Final Fantasy VII characters
