= Final Fantasy VII Rebirth =

2024 video game

- Cover art featuring (from left to right) Cloud Strife, Sephiroth, and Zack Fair
- Developer: Square Enix Creative Business Unit I
- Publisher: Square Enix
- Directors: Naoki Hamaguchi; Tetsuya Nomura; Motomu Toriyama
- Producer: Yoshinori Kitase
- Designers: Teruki Endo; Masanori Sato
- Programmers: Daiki Hoshina; Satoru Koyama; Ryo Hara
- Artist: Shintaro Takai
- Writer: Kazushige Nojima
- Composers: Masashi Hamauzu; Mitsuto Suzuki (Note: Original Final Fantasy VII music and the main theme "No Promises to Keep" were composed by Nobuo Uematsu. Additional music was contributed by Shotaro Shima, Shoya Sunakawa, Junnosuke Usui, Reo Uratani, Ryo Furukawa, Yoshitaka Suzuki, Yoshinori Nakamura, Tadayoshi Makino, Nozomi Toki, Shingo Kataoka, Tsuyoshi Sekito, and Keiki Kobayashi.)
- Series: Final Fantasy
- Engine: Unreal Engine 4
- Platforms: PlayStation 5; Windows; Nintendo Switch 2; Xbox Series X/S
- Release: PlayStation 5; February 29, 2024; Windows; January 23, 2025; Nintendo Switch 2, Xbox Series X/S; June 3, 2026
- Genre: Action role-playing
- Mode: Single-player

Final Fantasy VII Rebirth (Note: Japanese: ファイナルファンタジーVII リバース, Hepburn: Fainaru Fantajī Sebun Ribāsu) is a 2024 action role-playing game developed and published by Square Enix. It is the sequel to Final Fantasy VII Remake (2020) and the second in a trilogy of games remaking the 1997 PlayStation game Final Fantasy VII.

Like its predecessor, the gameplay of Rebirth combines real-time action with strategic and role-playing elements. Set immediately after Remake's events, players control mercenary Cloud Strife and a party of characters principally comprising the eco-terrorist group AVALANCHE, who embark on a journey across the Planet to prevent the megacorporation Shinra from exploiting its life essence, Mako, as an energy source, and defeat former elite SOLDIER Sephiroth, who seeks to unite with the Planet to achieve greater power.

Rebirth entered production in November 2019 prior to Remake's release, and was announced in June 2022. All of the previous game's lead staff return in the same positions, but with Tetsuya Nomura as creative director instead of director, and Naoki Hamaguchi as director instead of co-director.

Rebirth was released for the PlayStation 5 on February 29, 2024, and for Windows on January 23, 2025. Versions for Nintendo Switch 2 and Xbox Series X/S were launched on June 3, 2026. Upon release, the game was critically acclaimed; it was nominated for and won multiple end-of-year awards, including Game of the Year. Final Fantasy VII Revelation, which will conclude the Remake trilogy, is set to release in 2027.

== Gameplay ==
Final Fantasy VII Rebirth is the second in a planned trilogy of games remaking the 1997 PlayStation game Final Fantasy VII. It begins after the events of Final Fantasy VII Remake (2020), following the party's escape from the metropolis of Midgar.

Players primarily control Cloud Strife, a former Shinra soldier who joins the eco-terrorist group AVALANCHE to fight Shinra, who has been draining the Planet's life energy, and is drawn into a conflict with the legendary SOLDIER Sephiroth, who has returned after being presumed dead. Like Remake, Rebirth reimagines elements of the original game while expanding upon character development and the overall narrative structure.

The game features real-time exploration and combat, with a more open-ended overworld compared to the linear progression of Remake's Midgar. Objective markers appear in the heads-up display, highlighting main story quests and sidequests to complete along with their respective distances from the party in the overworld. In addition to walking on foot, the party can ride on Chocobos as a faster means of traversal. Rebirth expands on the hybrid of action-focused melee combat and the Active Time Battle (ATB) system introduced in Remake, in which the player takes control of a party of characters that can be freely switched between during gameplay. During combat, characters use both physical attacks and magic, and can consume items for offensive, defensive and resuscitative purposes from a menu while gameplay is suspended around them. The "Synergized" mechanic, first introduced in the downloadable content (DLC) "Episode INTERmission" campaign for Final Fantasy VII Remake Intergrade (2021), returns, allowing party members to synchronize their attacks.

== Plot ==
=== Setting and characters ===
Final Fantasy VII Rebirth continues the overarching narrative introduced in Final Fantasy VII Remake (2020), which serves as a reimagined adaptation of the plot, world, and characters of the original Final Fantasy VII (1997). Set on the Planet, the game follows the main characters as they seek to defeat the Shinra Electric Power Company, which rules over much of the Planet through its exploitation of the Lifestream, and confront Sephiroth (Tyler Hoechlin / Toshiyuki Morikawa), a legendary former member of Shinra's elite SOLDIER unit who was presumed dead. Sephiroth seeks to summon Meteor to wound the Planet and attain godhood by uniting with the Lifestream. Rebirth covers the events of the original game from the party's departure from Midgar to the Forgotten Capital. However as with Remake, its plot features several changes and divergences from the original, and the order in which locations are explored differs from that of the original game.

The protagonist and leader of the party is Cloud Strife (Cody Christian / Takahiro Sakurai), a former SOLDIER who now works as a mercenary assisting a splinter cell of the eco-terrorist group AVALANCHE, which opposes Shinra's exploitation of the Planet and its resources. Accompanying him are two of its members: Barret Wallace (John Eric Bentley / Masato Funaki), its brazen but empathetic leader, and Tifa Lockhart (Britt Baron / Ayumi Ito), Cloud's compassionate but reserved childhood friend who works as a bartender and is a practicing martial artist. They are joined by Aerith Gainsborough (Briana White / Maaya Sakamoto), a flower merchant who previously lived in Midgar's Sector 5 Slums and is the sole survivor of the ancient Cetra; Red XIII (Max Mittelman / Kappei Yamaguchi), an intelligent quadruped from Cosmo Canyon who Shinra held captive as a lab rat; and Yuffie Kisaragi (Suzie Yeung / Yumi Kakazu), an expert Materia thief and ninja from Wutai who resolves to join the team to realize Shinra's downfall after losing her partner Sonon Kusakabe in a failed attempt to extract the "Ultimate Materia" from their headquarters.

Supporting characters play roles throughout the story, including Zack Fair (Caleb Pierce / Kenichi Suzumura), Aerith's former boyfriend and the previous wielder of the Buster Sword, who escaped with Cloud after Shinra experimented on them using the cells of the extraterrestrial life-form Jenova; Cait Sith (Paul Tinto / Hideo Ishikawa), a robotic cat remotely controlled by Shinra's Head of Urban Development Reeve Tuesti (Jon Root / Banjō Ginga); Vincent Valentine (Matthew Mercer / Shōgo Suzuki), a former member of the Turks who Professor Hojo (James Sie / Shigeru Chiba) experimented on; and Cid Highwind (J. Michael Tatum / Kazuhiro Yamaji), a grizzled pilot from Rocket Town and an ex-Shinra rocket scientist who is dedicated to achieving spaceflight.

Other characters include Bugenhagen (Frank Todaro / Yōhei Tadano), the elder of Cosmo Canyon; AVALANCHE member Biggs (Gideon Emery / Shūhei Sakaguchi), who, unlike in the original game, survives the Sector 7 Plate's collapse in Midgar and now seeks revenge against Shinra for the deaths of his friends; Dyne (Dave B. Mitchell / Kenjiro Tsuda), a childhood friend of Barret from Mt. Corel and the biological father of his adopted daughter Marlene; and Elena (Piper Reese / Megumi Toyoguchi), a new recruit of the Turks who seeks to apprehend Cloud and his allies.

=== Synopsis ===
Following the events of the previous game, Zack Fair arrives in Midgar carrying a comatose Cloud. It is revealed that Zack resides in a timeline where the end of the world is imminent due to the total depletion of the Planet's Mako. In this timeline, AVALANCHE's escape from Midgar failed, with Barret and Tifa captured by Shinra, while Red XIII sacrificed himself to free a comatose Aerith. Zack hides Cloud and Aerith in the home of Aerith's mother Elmyra, while attempting to track down Biggs, the last surviving member of AVALANCHE. Biggs is revealed to have originated from the original timeline and was transported to Zack's through the Whispers' intervention. After Shinra troops kill Biggs and Marlene ominously prophesies that Sephiroth will kill Aerith, Zack is left conflicted over whether to prioritize saving Cloud or Aerith.

Back in the original timeline, Cloud and his companions rest in Kalm after escaping Midgar, where Cloud recounts his past with Sephiroth. Five years earlier when Cloud was a SOLDIER, he and Sephiroth were assigned to investigate a Mako reactor in Cloud and Tifa's hometown of Nibelheim. There, Sephiroth descended into madness after discovering that he was an artificial being created using Jenova's cells and set fire to the town, killing many inhabitants, including Cloud's mother and Tifa's father. Cloud pursued Sephiroth to the reactor where Jenova's body was stored but has no memory of what happened afterward. Later, Tifa confides in Aerith that although the events did occur, she has no recollection of Cloud being present.

The following day, Shinra forces raid Kalm, forcing the party to flee. They decide to follow the trail of the mysterious "black robes," former Shinra test subjects whom Cloud believes are gathering near Sephiroth. Their journey takes them through several locations, including the port city of Junon, the resort city of Costa del Sol, Barret's hometown of Corel, the Gold Saucer amusement park, Zack's hometown of Gongaga, Red XIII's hometown of Cosmo Canyon (where they learn his real name is Nanaki) and a rebuilt Nibelheim. Along the way, they recruit several new members: Wutai ninja Yuffie Kisaragi, remote-controlled robot cat Cait Sith, freelance pilot Cid Highwind, and former Turk supersoldier Vincent Valentine.

During their journey, the party discovers that the Planet has manifested its guardians, known as the Weapons, to protect itself. They also learn that the absence of the Arbiter of Fate has caused a schism among the Whispers, with one faction aiding Sephiroth and the other attempting to protect the Planet. Meanwhile, Rufus is inaugurated as Shinra's new president and continues the company's search for the Promised Land to surpass his father, while diplomatic relations between Shinra and Wutai deteriorate, threatening war. The party eventually discovers that Sephiroth intends to use the Black Materia to summon Meteor and destroy the Planet. They race Shinra to a mystical fortress known as the Temple of the Ancients and obtain the Black Materia, only for Sephiroth to manipulate Cloud into handing it over. Sephiroth explains that the destruction of the Arbiter of Fate created countless alternate worlds, allowing him to enact "Reunion" by forcibly merging them into a single world that would become the paradise he seeks to rule. As Cloud is compelled to attack Aerith, he manages to resist Sephiroth's control, and the two fall into a forest below.

Upon awakening, Cloud finds himself in a version of Midgar accompanied by an unusually cheerful Aerith. He learns that the Whispers have depleted her ancestral White Materia, which can counter the Black Materia. An alternate Aerith subsequently summons Cloud to her world, where she confesses her feelings for him and gives him her White Materia as a replacement. Rejoining the party, Cloud follows Aerith's trail to an ancient Cetra city. Inside, Cloud finds Aerith attempting a Cetra ritual to thwart Sephiroth's plans. The Whispers attempt to force him to attack her, but he resists just as Sephiroth descends to kill Aerith. Although Cloud blocks Sephiroth's sword and disarms him, the timeline shifts to one in which Sephiroth succeeds in killing Aerith. The White Materia falls into the water, and while the party battles Jenova, Cloud becomes separated from his companions, with his reality converging with that of an alternate Zack.

Sephiroth banishes Zack back to his timeline, but an Aerith from Zack's reality arrives to aid Cloud. Sephiroth retreats, while Zack expresses confidence that he and Cloud will cross paths again. Meanwhile, Rufus realizes that Sephiroth orchestrated the tensions between Shinra and Wutai as a distraction, while more black robes gather in Nibelheim. The party is left despondent over Aerith's death, except for Cloud, who continues to perceive and interact with her, seemingly unaware that he is the only one who can see her. As the party prepares to pursue Sephiroth farther north, Cloud discovers that he somehow still possesses the Black Materia, which he fuses into the Buster Sword. He then parts ways with Aerith, who says she will remain behind to find a way to stop Meteor.

== Development ==
During the promotion of Final Fantasy VII Remake (2020), Square Enix confirmed that it would not cover the original's complete story, but rather act as a standalone first game in "a multi-part series, with each entry providing its own unique experience". Game director Tetsuya Nomura cited a "massive undertaking to reconstruct Final Fantasy VII from the ground up with the current technology" as the reason why a remake was not possible for some time. He went on to elaborate that fully remaking its content in a single installment would necessitate cutting various elements to suit the target hardware and gameplay design, by which point a remake would be considered pointless. He additionally expressed a desire to expand on the original game's depiction of Midgar for one game, wanting players to explore various areas that were previously inaccessible in the original, with heightened detail due to the increased power of newer generation hardware. While Nomura understood the nostalgia behind the original game's story, he envisioned Remake as a reimagining that would "get the fans of the original version excited".

Producer Yoshinori Kitase likened the remake's "multi-part" structure to Final Fantasy XIII (2009) being followed by Final Fantasy XIII-2 (2011) and Lightning Returns: Final Fantasy XIII (2013). He stated that Remake's structure would differ from that of XIII's due to its nature as a remake of a pre-existing narrative centered on a central protagonist, Cloud Strife, as opposed to the multiple perspectives focused on across the XIII trilogy. He also anticipated each game in the Remake series to be approximately as long as one of the Final Fantasy XIII games. Kitase would subsequently reveal the Final Fantasy VII Remake project to encompass a trilogy, between Remake, its sequel, and a third, final entry. The development team had initially conceived of remaking it across two games rather than three, citing the indecision on direction as a primary reason for their lack of clarification on how many parts the remake would have. Kitase explained that this was due to the difficulties in determining development scheduling due to the lack of understanding regarding the project's overall scope. The follow-up to Remake had begun active development by November 2019 prior to the game's initial release on PlayStation 4. According to Nomura, the game was designed with newcomers in mind.

Nomura later stated in July 2020 that the intent was to produce a higher quality game than its predecessor, while also ensuring it was released "as quickly as possible". In regards to the technical improvements made in Remake's enhanced 2021 port, Final Fantasy VII Remake Intergrade, Nomura noted that while environmental effects such as fog were added to the port in order to, "further enhance the sense of realism and immersion in the world", he advised fans to wait for future entries that would take proper advantage of the PS5's hardware and features in both gameplay and graphics. Game director Naoki Hamaguchi separately expressed a desire to leverage the new gameplay and battle mechanics introduced in the downloadable content (DLC) episode INTERmission, such as team-up attacks performed by Yuffie Kisaragi and Sonon Kusakabe, in the next game, as he felt they made for a "different feel in battle strategy".

Rebirth was revealed alongside Crisis Core: Final Fantasy VII Reunion, a remaster of Crisis Core for modern platforms using Unreal Engine 4 which implements quality-of-life improvements to gameplay and presentation to bring the game in line with Remake. This includes Remake's English voice cast, who replace the original actors from other media in the Compilation of Final Fantasy VII. Reunion was part of the Final Fantasy VII Remake project and served as a prequel to the main trilogy, with the remaster designed to familiarize players with the story of Zack Fair ahead of his appearance in Rebirth, where he would play a more significant role. Lead battle programmer Satoru Koyama spoke on the potential of incorporating improved party A.I. in the battle system for Rebirth and its sequel, remarking on its potential to multitask between physical attack techniques and magic casting, while expressing a desire to surpass the 'gambit' system used for non-controlled party members in Final Fantasy XII (2006).

In contrast to Remake, which is set solely in Midgar, the development team wanted to highlight the unique characteristics of each region in Rebirth, including sun-drenched Cosmo Canyon, the light-hearted Gold Saucer, and the desolated Nibelheim region, suffering under Shinra's extraction. They included numerous exploration elements, such as hidden paths, in each open field area. Hamaguchi estimated that the game contained about twice as much "side content" as main story content, including exploration and minigames. These minigames were a major feature of the original game so recreating and expanding on them was an important goal in Rebirth. Scenario writer Kazushige Nojima used new scenes that were not present in the original game to elaborate on character development and emotional reactions which would not have been possible due to limitations in technology, such as lack of voiceover and detailed facial expressions. They used the Nibelheim flashback to depict a less experienced Cloud and more playful Sephiroth to create a contrast with their present selves. Cloud's relationship with his teammates becomes more friendly and open in Rebirth, reflecting his mental journey. Nojima also used Rebirth as an opportunity to properly express the friendship between Tifa and Aerith, which he felt had been misinterpreted as a rivalry in the original game. Hamaguchi thought that the focus of Nojima's script was "bonds", which inspired him to tie that into the combat gameplay through Synergy abilities. Each party member in Rebirth has a distinct playstyle. This feature was challenging to design for Red XIII, because of his quadrupedal stance, and Cait Sith, who switches between solo and mounted on his Moogle doll.

== Marketing and release ==
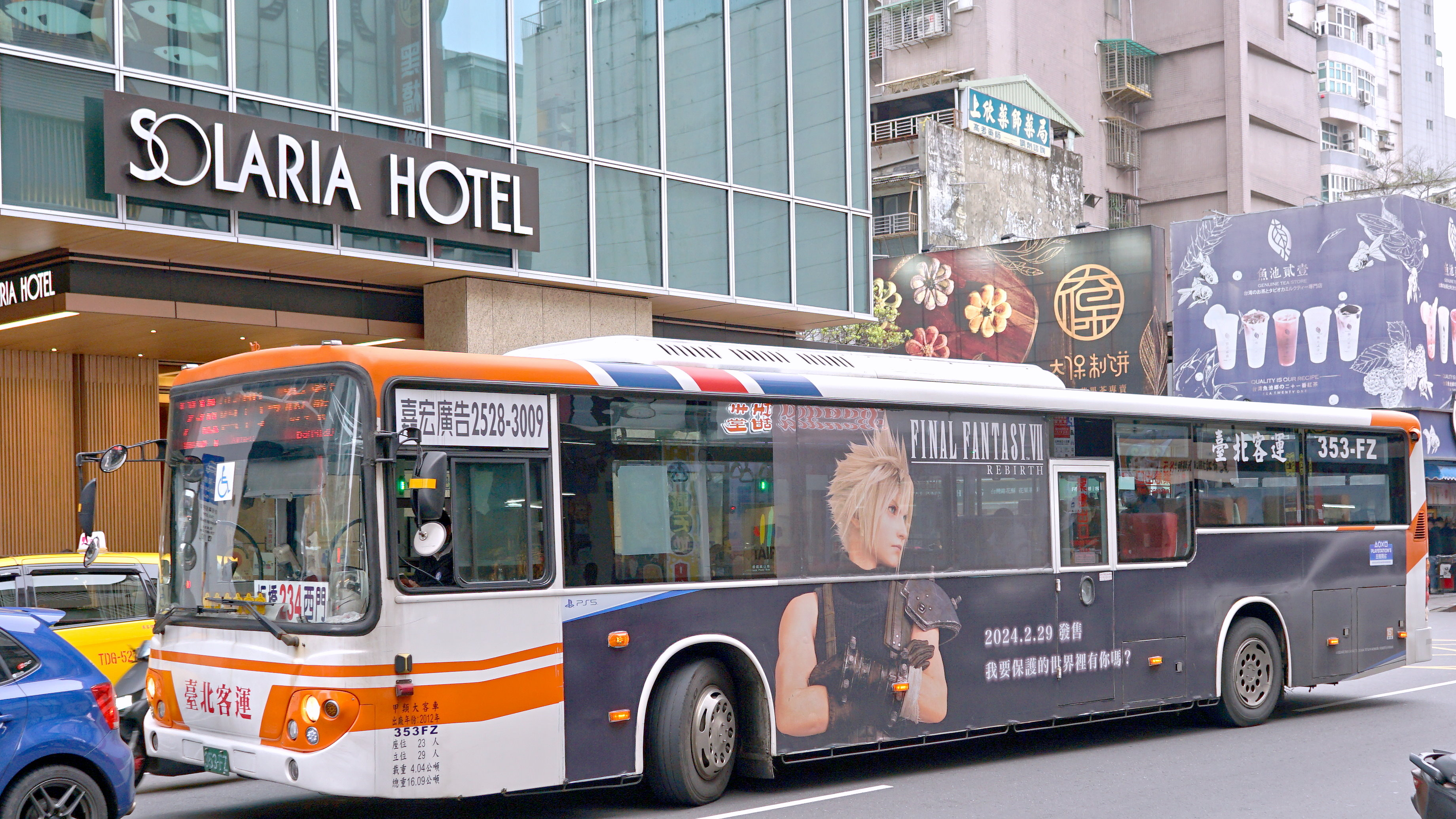
Taipei bus advertising
Final Fantasy VII Rebirth

Final Fantasy VII Rebirth was announced by Square Enix as the third installment of the Final Fantasy VII Remake project, alongside Crisis Core: Final Fantasy VII Reunion and the Steam version of Final Fantasy VII Remake Intergrade, in June 2022 during the Final Fantasy VII 25th Anniversary Celebration livestream.

In June 2023, the official social media handles for the game began posting a series of developer messages. Game director Naoki Hamaguchi promised that Rebirth would feature a "wide and multifaceted world with a high degree of freedom" with multiple story routes, in comparison to the more structured, linear progression throughout Midgar in Remake. A gameplay trailer was presented on June 9 during that year's Summer Game Fest live show hosted by Geoff Keighley, unveiling the game's exploration and combat mechanics, teasing various story elements, as well as detailing characters set to appear in the game. Another trailer premiered during PlayStation's State of Play presentation held in September revealing the game's release date of February 29, 2024. A new trailer was revealed at The Game Awards 2023, which showcased the song "No Promises to Keep" by Loren Allred, as well as new gameplay footage, including Vincent Valentine and Cid Highwind. Also revealed at The Game Awards was a Final Fantasy VII collaboration with Apex Legends.

Rebirth was released for the PlayStation 5 on February 29, 2024, as a timed console exclusive for at least 3 months. Alongside the standard edition, a physical Deluxe Edition was available to purchase from participating retailers, while a Collector's Edition was distributed in limited quantities exclusively through the Square Enix Store. Both editions bundle the game with a special steelbook case for the game discs, a mini-soundtrack CD and an artbook. The Collector's Edition includes the aforementioned content alongside a collectible statue of Sephiroth and downloadable content (DLC) keys for additional in-game items. The game was one of the first major video game releases to release on Leap Day.

On December 12, 2024, during the Game Awards 2024, Square Enix announced that a Windows version of the game would be released on January 23, 2025. In September 2025, Square Enix confirmed that the entire Final Fantasy VII Remake trilogy, including Rebirth, would be made available on Nintendo Switch 2 and Xbox Series X/S in addition to existing platforms. Creative director Naoki Hamaguchi confirmed that Rebirth would launch on the aforementioned platforms as soon as possible to give new players ample time to catch up on the storyline, ahead of the launch of the third entry.

During the February 2026 Nintendo Direct Partner Showcase presentation, Square Enix announced that Final Fantasy VII Rebirth would release for Nintendo Switch 2 and Xbox Series X/S on June 3, 2026. As with Final Fantasy VII Remake Intergrade on the aforementioned platforms, the new versions feature an easier 'Streamlined Progression' difficulty toggle which enables numerous boosters to be active in gameplay, such as max gil, party stats and damage dealt to enemies. The standard versions of the game on both platforms are also available at a reduced price of $49.99 USD / 66.99 CAD in North America, with digital pre-orders of any edition also being subjected to a 20% discount until the game's launch. The Nintendo Switch 2 version of Rebirth is available physically on a Game Key Card, with launch copies being bundled with a special Magic: The Gathering booster card from the Final Fantasy line, featuring special art of Zack Fair drawn by Tetsuya Nomura in limited quantities. The Xbox Series X/S versions of Rebirth support Xbox Play Anywhere cross-platform progression with the Microsoft Store version of the game on PC, which launched simultaneously. A demo for the game structured similarly to the PlayStation 5 pre-release demo, was released for Nintendo Switch 2 and Xbox Series X/S on April 28, 2026. Final Fantasy VII Rebirth on PlayStation 5 and Windows received a permanent price reduction in parity with the other consoles on February 9, 2026, and added the Streamlined Progression boosters in a game update, simultaneously with the release of Rebirth on Switch 2 and Xbox.

=== Downloadable content ===
The Collector's Edition of Final Fantasy VII Rebirth includes access keys for downloadable content (DLC) items that can be equipped on the party earlier in the game. These include a Summon Materia DLC pack unlocking the Moogle Trio and Magic Pot Summons for use in battle, and various accessories and equipment for the characters such as a Reclaimant Choker and Orchid Bracelet armor set. Additional Summon Materia are available as early unlocks to players who have save data from either Final Fantasy VII Remake on PlayStation 4 or Final Fantasy VII Remake Intergrade on their PS5 console when launching Rebirth. Players with save data from the aforementioned games can unlock the Leviathan Summon Materia from the start of the game, while players on PS5 with save data from the "Episode INTERmission" story DLC for Intergrade also have access to the Ramuh Summon Materia.

=== Windows edition ===
During The Game Awards 2024, Square Enix announced that Final Fantasy VII Rebirth would be released on Windows via Steam and Epic Games Store on January 23, 2025. The Windows version features a range of graphics settings that allows players to get the best quality across their different machines. There are three default graphics presets and the ability to customize the settings. These presets have been optimized to allow Windows players to experience the game with optimized quality across various different set-ups.

The Windows version is capable of frame rates of up to 120 FPS and a includes visual enhancements, including refined lighting, improved environment detail, more detailed textures, and NVIDIA DLSS. As for controls, connecting a DualSense controller allows players to use the same controls as the PS5 version. Keyboard and mouse support has also been added, alongside the option to freely customize the controls between world exploration and combat or mini-games.

== Reception ==
=== Critical response ===
Reception

Aggregate scores
Aggregator	Score
Metacritic	PS5: 92/100 (Note: Based on 151 critic reviews); PC: 90/100 (Note: Based on 48 critic reviews); NS2: 87/100 (Note: Based on 51 reviews)
OpenCritic	97% recommend (Note: Based on 232 critic reviews)

Review scores
Publication	Score
Destructoid	9.5/10
Digital Trends	4.5/5
Easy Allies	9.5/10
Edge	9/10
Eurogamer	4/5
Famitsu	38/40
Game Informer	8.5/10
GameSpot	8/10
GamesRadar+	4.5/5
Hardcore Gamer	4/5
IGN	9/10
NME	5/5
Push Square	8/10
RPGFan	93/100
Shacknews	8/10
The Guardian	4/5
Video Games Chronicle	5/5
VG247	4/5

Final Fantasy VII Rebirth received "universal acclaim" from critics, according to review aggregator website Metacritic. OpenCritic reported that 97% of critic reviews recommended the game.

=== Sales ===
The game was the highest-selling new release in Japan during its first week, selling over 262,000 physical units. Final Fantasy VII Rebirth was the biggest-selling game at Japanese retail in March, shifting over 310,000 units and took over the Top Five in the boxed games charts. Rebirth was the second best selling game of February 2024 in the United States despite being out for only 24 hours along with the Remake & Rebirth Twin Pack being 8th. It was also the most downloaded PlayStation game in Japan and the 14th most downloaded game in North America. It won the Grand Award at the PlayStation Partners Awards awarded to the top three games developed in the Japan and Asia regions with the highest worldwide sales between October 2023 and September 2024. The Windows port peaked at 40,564 concurrent players on Steam, which made it the biggest single-player Final Fantasy release on Windows; in dollar sales, it was the best-selling game in the United States in its first week, while its bundle with Remake ranked third. It placed third on Steam's monthly chart in January while the Final Fantasy VII Remake & Rebirth Twin Pack ranked sixteenth. According to analysts it smashed through their expectations and projections for that fiscal year. Final Fantasy VII Rebirth was one of the most successful remakes from January 2024 to September 2025.

In the company’s May 2024 financial report, Square Enix president Takashi Kiryu announced that PS5 launch sales of Final Fantasy VII Rebirth fell below expectations. In December of that year, producer Yoshinori Kitase stated that the company was "satisfied that [they were] meeting a certain number of sales", but that they could not be exclusive to a single platform "with the current modernization state of games". Kitase added: "I think we need to [be able to] offer the game to as many players as we can." In September 2025, game director Naoki Hamaguchi addressed the speculation on sales figures, reassuring that "the game has been doing very well on PS5 and PC" and confirming that the third installment in the trilogy was still in development.

Following the announcement of Final Fantasy VII Revelation at Summer Game Fest 2026, Hamaguchi said that sales of Remake and Rebirth were "several times better" than expected. In its Q1 fiscal report published on August 11, 2026, Square Enix attributed a major surge in first-quarter earnings to the release of Final Fantasy VII Rebirth on Nintendo Switch 2, Xbox Series X and S, and the Microsoft Store.

=== Awards ===
Year	Ceremony	Category	Result	Ref.
2023	Golden Joystick Awards	Most Wanted Game	Won	
2023	The Game Awards 2023	Most Anticipated Game	Won	
2024	Japan Game Awards 2024	Award for Excellence	Won	
2024	15th Hollywood Music in Media Awards	Music Supervision – Video Game	Nominated	
2024	Golden Joystick Awards	Ultimate Game of the Year	Runner-up	
2024	Golden Joystick Awards	Best Storytelling	Won	
2024	Golden Joystick Awards	Best Soundtrack	Won	
2024	Golden Joystick Awards	Best Lead Performer (Cody Christian)	Won	
2024	Golden Joystick Awards	Best Supporting Performer (Briana White)	Won	
2024	Golden Joystick Awards	Console Game of the Year	Nominated	
2024	Titanium Awards 2024	Game of the Year	Nominated	
2024	The Game Awards 2024	Game of the Year	Nominated	
2024	The Game Awards 2024	Best Game Direction	Nominated	
2024	The Game Awards 2024	Best Narrative	Nominated	
2024	The Game Awards 2024	Best Score and Music	Won	
2024	The Game Awards 2024	Best Audio Design	Nominated	
2024	The Game Awards 2024	Best Performance (Briana White)	Nominated	
2024	The Game Awards 2024	Best Role-Playing Game	Nominated	
2025	New York Game Awards	Big Apple Award for Best Game of the Year	Nominated	
2025	New York Game Awards	Statue of Liberty Award for Best World	Nominated	
2025	New York Game Awards	Great White Way Award for Best Acting in a Game (John Eric Bentley)	Nominated	
2025	New York Game Awards	Freedom Tower Award for Best Remake	Nominated	
2025	28th Annual D.I.C.E. Awards	Role-Playing Game of the Year	Nominated	
2025	28th Annual D.I.C.E. Awards	Outstanding Achievement in Animation	Nominated	
2025	28th Annual D.I.C.E. Awards	Outstanding Achievement in Character (Yuffie Kisaragi)	Nominated	
2025	Famitsu Dengeki Game Awards 2024	Game of the Year	Won	
2025	Famitsu Dengeki Game Awards 2024	MVC (Best Game Developer/Studio) ("FINAL FANTASY VII REVERSE Development Team")	Won	
2025	Famitsu Dengeki Game Awards 2024	Scenario	Won	
2025	Famitsu Dengeki Game Awards 2024	Graphics	Won	
2025	Famitsu Dengeki Game Awards 2024	Music	Nominated	
2025	Famitsu Dengeki Game Awards 2024	Voice Acting (Maaya Sakamoto as Aerith Gainsborough)	Won	
2025	Famitsu Dengeki Game Awards 2024	Character (Tifa Lockhart)	Won	
2025	Famitsu Dengeki Game Awards 2024	RPG	Won	
2025	25th Game Developers Choice Awards	Game of the Year	Nominated	
2025	25th Game Developers Choice Awards	Best Audio	Nominated	
2025	25th Game Developers Choice Awards	Best Design	Honorable mention	
2025	25th Game Developers Choice Awards	Best Narrative	Honorable mention	
2025	25th Game Developers Choice Awards	Audience Award	Won	
2025	NAVGTR Awards 2024	Game of the Year	Nominated	
2025	NAVGTR Awards 2024	Game, Franchise Role-Playing	Won	
2025	21st British Academy Games Awards	Artistic Achievement	Longlisted	
2025	21st British Academy Games Awards	Audio Achievement	Longlisted	
2025	21st British Academy Games Awards	Music	Nominated	
2025	21st British Academy Games Awards	Narrative	Nominated	
2025	21st British Academy Games Awards	Performer in a Leading Role (Cody Christian as Cloud Strife)	Longlisted	
2025	21st British Academy Games Awards	Performer in a Supporting Role (John Eric Bentley as Barret Wallace)	Longlisted	
2025	21st British Academy Games Awards	Technical Achievement	Longlisted	
2025	6th Pégases Awards	Best Foreign Video Game	Nominated	
2026	The Steam Awards 2025	Outstanding Visual Style	Nominated	
