= Shōgo Suzuki (actor, born 1963) =

Japanese actor and narrator (born 1963)

Shōgo Suzuki (鈴木 省吾, Suzuki Shōgo, born 12 April 1963) is a Japanese actor and narrator known for voicing Vincent Valentine in Square Enix's Compilation of Final Fantasy VII. He began his career narrating television commercials and instructional videos for corporations. He debuted as a voice actor in Final Fantasy VII Advent Children.

== Filmography ==
Year	Title	Role	Notes
2005	Final Fantasy VII: Advent Children	Vincent Valentine	
2006	Dirge of Cerberus: Final Fantasy VII	Vincent Valentine	
2017	Dissidia Final Fantasy Opera Omnia	Vincent Valentine	
2023	Final Fantasy VII: Ever Crisis	Vincent Valentine	
2024	Final Fantasy VII Rebirth	Vincent Valentine	

== Stage ==
Year	Title	Role	Notes
2007	Bleach: The Dark of the Bleeding Moon	Kenpachi Zaraki	
