= Buster Sword =

Fictional weapon from Final Fantasy

- 3D render of the Buster Sword
- Publisher: Square Enix
- First appearance: Final Fantasy VII (1997)
- Created by: Tetsuya Nomura

In-universe information
- Type: Broadsword
- Owners: Cloud Strife; Zack Fair; Angeal Hewley

The Buster Sword (Japanese: バスターソード, Hepburn: Basutā Sōdo) is a fictional weapon introduced in the 1997 role-playing game Final Fantasy VII. It is a massive broadsword primarily associated with the game's protagonist, Cloud Strife. The weapon has since appeared in numerous Final Fantasy titles and crossover series, including Kingdom Hearts.

The Buster Sword was designed by Final Fantasy artist and creative director Tetsuya Nomura. During development of Final Fantasy VII Remake, Square Enix considered making its appearance and handling more realistic, but the development team was concerned that major changes to such a familiar design would be poorly received. As a result, later versions have generally retained the original shape while adding more detailed models and textures.

The weapon has frequently been described as one of the most recognizable swords in video games, largely because of its association with Cloud and Final Fantasy VII, a game often included in lists of the greatest video games ever made.

== Creation and design ==
Early sketches of Cloud's design by Tetsuya Nomura

Early concept art for the Buster Sword depicted a smaller and thinner weapon. Different versions of the sword have included a small chain attached to the pommel, magnets used to secure the blade to Cloud's back, and a more detailed design described by Nomura as resembling a "Western-style sword".

The blade became larger in later illustrations. Nomura referred to the design as the "Giant Kitchen Knife" and imagined it as a roughly finished piece of steel. Despite its size, Cloud is depicted wielding the sword quickly and acrobatically. The developers of the Remake series chose not to make major changes to this aspect of the character because of how closely it had become associated with him. Character modelling director Masaaki Kazeno drew inspiration from dancers when designing Cloud's movements in Final Fantasy VII Remake.

Concept artwork of Cloud's Fusion Swords from Advent Children

The history of the Buster Sword was expanded in Crisis Core: Final Fantasy VII, which established Angeal Hewley as its first known owner and placed the weapon at the center of the relationship between Angeal, Zack Fair, and Cloud. Square Enix later used this connection in its trading card game, where cards depicting the three characters emphasized the sword's succession between them.

The version of the sword used in Crisis Core was based on its appearance in Advent Children. Its design was revised again for the Remake series and Crisis Core: Final Fantasy VII Reunion. Nomura also redesigned Cloud and the Buster Sword for Kingdom Hearts, where the blade is wrapped in bandages.

For Advent Children, the development team replaced the Buster Sword with a set of six weapons collectively known during production as the "Fusion Swords" (合体剣, Gattai Ken). The idea originated from a joke that, because Cloud's weapon in the original game was already extremely large, he should use several swords in the sequel.

Early storyboard concepts showed Cloud carrying six separate swords on his back. The design was later changed so the weapons could combine into a single larger sword. Although the designers acknowledged that the idea was not physically realistic, they believed it added an interesting visual element to the film.

== Appearances ==
The Buster Sword first appeared in Final Fantasy VII as Cloud Strife's starting weapon. Flashbacks later reveal that it previously belonged to Zack Fair. After Zack is killed by Shinra infantrymen, Cloud takes the sword and carries it with him.

In Final Fantasy VII: Advent Children, Cloud no longer uses the Buster Sword in battle, instead fighting with the Fusion Swords. He leaves the original weapon at Zack's grave as a memorial.

Crisis Core: Final Fantasy VII further develops the weapon's history. It reveals that the Buster Sword originally belonged to Angeal Hewley, a 1st Class SOLDIER. After Zack is forced to fight Angeal, the dying Angeal gives the sword to him. Zack later passes it to Cloud shortly before his own death.

The Buster Sword also appears as Cloud's starting weapon in Final Fantasy VII Remake and Final Fantasy VII Rebirth.

The weapon has appeared in several crossover titles. In Dissidia Final Fantasy, Cloud begins battles with the Buster Sword, which can later transform into the Ultimate Weapon. In Final Fantasy Tactics, Cloud instead uses a weapon called the Materia Blade. A Buster Sword based on Cloud's equipment was also released as downloadable content for Lightning Returns: Final Fantasy XIII.

== Reception ==
Angeal, Zack, and Cloud, the three principal wielders of the Buster Sword

The Buster Sword has frequently appeared in lists and discussions of notable video game weapons. The A.V. Club included it among the most exaggerated oversized weapons in games, while also describing it as an important visual symbol of both Cloud and the Final Fantasy series.

Comic Book Resources described the Buster Sword as possibly the most important weapon in the Final Fantasy series, pointing to both its unusual size and its narrative connection between Angeal, Zack, and Cloud. Red Bull ranked it first on a list of iconic video game weapons, ahead of weapons such as the Master Sword from The Legend of Zelda.

The Escapist also included the Buster Sword among notable video game swords, commenting on the contrast between its enormous size and Cloud's ability to use it acrobatically.

In the essay "The Timelessness of Final Fantasy VII", K. Morrissey argued that the sword helps define Cloud's character because he handles the oversized weapon with apparent ease both during combat and in his victory animations. Nintendo Force Magazine similarly identified it as one of gaming's most recognizable swords and noted its connection to Final Fantasy VII's Materia system, as the weapon contains slots that allow players to equip magic and abilities.

In Final Fantasy and Philosophy: The Ultimate Walkthrough, Jason P. Blahuta discussed the sword in relation to Cloud's false memories and his assumption of parts of Zack's identity. Blahuta argued that Cloud's possession of Zack's sword reinforces the game's treatment of identity and memory.

The Buster Sword has also been discussed in academic writing about gender. In Queerness in Play, Todd Harper, Meghan Blythe Adams, and Nicholas Taylor analyze Cloud's stance with the sword in relation to masculinity, comparing him with other Final Fantasy protagonists such as Cecil Harvey of Final Fantasy IV.

Variety included the Buster Sword and Fusion Swords in a gallery of notable fictional swords, commenting on the implausibility of an ordinary person wielding weapons of their size.

Several writers have focused on the weapon's role in Crisis Core. Screen Rant described the sword as a physical representation of the ideals passed from Angeal to Zack and then from Zack to Cloud. TheGamer similarly praised the decision to expand the sword's history by connecting its successive owners and making it an object Cloud cannot permanently discard during Final Fantasy VII. GameRant also discussed the development of the sword's design and the way Crisis Core presents it as an heirloom passed between the three characters.

Nicolas Courcier and Mehdi El Kanafi interpreted Cloud's placement of the Buster Sword in Aerith's church at the end of Advent Children as symbolic of Zack and Aerith Gainsborough being reunited after death.

Writers have also commented on the Buster Sword's usefulness in later games. TheGamer considered it Cloud's best overall weapon in Final Fantasy VII Remake, noting that unlike the starting weapons of several other party members, it remains useful throughout the game. Screen Rant made a similar observation about Final Fantasy VII Rebirth, where the Buster Sword remains competitive with weapons acquired later.

The Verge examined the Buster Sword in relation to one of Rebirth's narrative twists. The article noted that Cloud's weapon is carefully handled during scenes involving his false memories of the Nibelheim incident and argued that details involving the sword help conceal inconsistencies in his account of the past.

Liisa Pirhonen cited the sword in a study of stylized low-poly character modelling, using the more detailed model in Final Fantasy VII Remake as an example of how modern graphics can preserve an exaggerated design while giving it a more realistic appearance.

The weapon has also inspired numerous real-world replicas. Kotaku, PC Gamer, and Complex have reported on fan-made or professionally produced versions of the sword.

A large replica also appeared at Square Enix's booth during Tokyo Game Show 2025, where game designer Naoki Yoshida posed with it as part of a promotional display for the Magic: The Gathering—Final Fantasy card set.
