= Cloud Strife =

Protagonist in Final Fantasy VII

- Final Fantasy character
- Cloud Strife artwork by Tetsuya Nomura for Final Fantasy VII
- First game: Final Fantasy VII (1997)
- Created by: Yoshinori Kitase, Kazushige Nojima, Tetsuya Nomura, Hironobu Sakaguchi
- Designed by: Tetsuya Nomura
- Voiced by: English: Steve Burton (2002–2018); Cody Christian (2020–present); Major Dodson (Remake, young); Japanese: Kenyu Horiuchi (Ehrgeiz, arcade version); Nozomu Sasaki (Ehrgeiz, home console version); Takahiro Sakurai (2002–present); Yukihiro Aizawa (Remake, young)

In-universe information
- Weapon: Buster Sword
- Home: Nibelheim

Cloud Strife (Japanese: クラウド・ストライフ, Hepburn: Kuraudo Sutoraifu) is a character and the protagonist of the 1997 role-playing video game Final Fantasy VII by Square (now Square Enix). He is also the protagonist of its remakes Final Fantasy VII Remake (2020) and Final Fantasy VII Rebirth (2024), as well as its animated film sequel Final Fantasy VII: Advent Children (2005), with appearances in several other installments in the Compilation of Final Fantasy VII and the wider Final Fantasy series. He has also appeared in other media, including the Kingdom Hearts series by Square Enix and The Walt Disney Company and the Super Smash Bros. series by Nintendo.

Throughout Final Fantasy VII and its compilation that expands its universe, Cloud Strife is portrayed as a mercenary working for the eco-terrorist group AVALANCHE in their efforts against the Shinra Electric Power Company, a mega corporation who plans to drain the world of its lifestream. Cloud experiences internal struggles in confronting his own traumatic past, including his history with former colleague Sephiroth.

Cloud was designed by Tetsuya Nomura, a character artist for the Final Fantasy series, whose role expanded to include supervision over Cloud's personality. Yoshinori Kitase, director of VII, and Kazushige Nojima, an events planner, developed the story and wanted to create a mysterious character who acted atypically for a hero. Nomura redesigned Cloud for Advent Children, giving him a more realistic appearance, along with new weaponry and a new outfit. For Remake, the team aimed to adapt his classic design for a more realistic art style.

Cloud has garnered generally positive reception from critics and is considered to be one of the most iconic video game protagonists. He has also been cited favorably as an example of complex character writing in video games, as one of video gaming's first unreliable narrators, and for the game's depiction of his mental disorder. Additionally, he is seen as a messiah figure in both the game and film for opposing Sephiroth's schemes with support from his allies.

== Concept ==
In contrast to Final Fantasy VI, which featured multiple "main characters", Square's staff decided in the beginning of Final Fantasy VII's development that the game would follow a single identifiable protagonist. In Hironobu Sakaguchi's first plot treatment, a prototype for Cloud's character belonged to an organization attempting to destroy New York City's "Mako Reactors". Kitase and Nomura discussed that Cloud would be the lead of three protagonists, but Nomura did not receive character profiles or a completed scenario in advance. Left to imagine the stories behind the characters he designed, Nomura shared these details in discussions with staff or in separately penned notes. Frustrated by the continued popularity of Final Fantasy IV's characters despite the release of two sequels, Nomura made it his goal to create a memorable cast. The contrast between Cloud, a "young, passionate boy", and Sephiroth, a "more mature and cool" individual, struck Amano as "intriguing", though not unusual as a pairing. When designing Cloud and Sephiroth, Nomura imagined a rivalry mirroring that of Miyamoto Musashi and Sasaki Kojirō, with Cloud and Sephiroth representing Musashi and Kojirō, respectively.

Kitase and Nojima developed Cloud's backstory and his relationship to Sephiroth. While drafting the game's scenario, Nojima saw a standing animation created by event planner Motomu Toriyama that depicted "Cloud showing off". The animation impressed Nojima and inspired the idea that Cloud had developed a false persona. This later led Nojima to create Zack Fair, a SOLDIER whom Cloud aspired to be like, to expand on the mystery of Cloud's past. Nojima left the unfolding of events regarding Cloud's identity unwritten, and Kitase was unaware of the significance of Zack's addition until playtesting. Kitase reviewed Nojima's scenario and felt that Cloud, who was neither single-minded nor righteous, offered a fresh take on a protagonist. The love triangle between Cloud, Tifa Lockhart, and Aerith Gainsborough was also viewed as novel for the series. Nojima likened Cloud and Tifa's relationship to one of friends since nursery school, and he compared Aerith to a transfer student arriving mid-term.

In early versions of the script, Sephiroth deceives Cloud into thinking that he had created him, and he has the ability to exert control over Cloud's movements. Cloud also somehow injures Tifa prior to the game's events, leaving her with memory loss of the event and a large scar on her back. As in the finished game, Cloud discovers that Shinra's experiments and his own insecurities made him susceptible to Sephiroth's manipulation. Kitase rejected a proposed scene written by Masato Kato involving Cloud and Tifa walking out of a Chocobo stable the morning before the final battle, with Tifa following only after checking around. Kitase found it "too intense" and Nojima described the proposal as "extreme"; however, Kitase maintained a toned-down scene written by Kato depicting the night before, which has Tifa speak a risqué line of dialogue before a fade to black. According to Nojima, none of the staff expected that the scene, despite dialogue, "would be something so important".

Nojima wanted to write scenes in such a way that players themselves could decide what Cloud was thinking. Nojima used Cloud's foggy memories as a device to provide details about the world that would be unknown to the player but considered common knowledge to its inhabitants. To emphasize Cloud's personality, event planners repeated elements they found interesting, such as Toriyama's standing animation and Cloud's use of the phrase "not interested".

In retrospective, Nomura and Final Fantasy VII Remake co-director Naoki Hamaguchi have described Cloud as a "dorky character". According to Nomura, although post-Final Fantasy VII titles featuring Cloud have emphasized his "cool side", "in the original game, Cloud had many comical or lame moments". Nomura believes that the reason Cloud became popular with audiences is due to the impact his personality made on Nojima's scenario.

=== Designs ===
Early sketches of Cloud's design by Tetsuya Nomura

In addition to testing models ported from Square's 1995 SIGGRAPH demo, Nomura and several other artists created new characters for Final Fantasy VII, including an early design of Cloud. Impressed with Nomura's illustrations and detailed handwritten notes for Final Fantasy V and VI, Sakaguchi tasked him with designing Final Fantasy VII's main characters.

Nomura's notes listed Cloud's job as magic swordsman (魔法剣士, mahō kenshi). Cloud's design underwent several revisions. Nomura's first draft of Cloud featured slicked-back black hair to contrast with the long silver hair of the game's primary antagonist, Sephiroth, and to minimize the model's polygon count. However, to make Cloud stand out more and emphasize his role as the game's lead protagonist, Nomura altered Cloud's design to give him spiky blond hair. Nomura also made Cloud taller than he appeared in the SGI Onyx demo, while a discarded iteration drawn "more on the realistic side" depicted Cloud with a taller head and body and more muscular physique.

Yoshitaka Amano, who handled character illustrations for previous Final Fantasy titles, painted promotional images for the game by taking Nomura's "drawings and put[ting his] own spin on them". According to Amano, because of the hardware limitations of the PlayStation, the platform Square had settled on for Final Fantasy VII, characters could not be rendered realistically. Amano thought that Cloud's baggy pants, which taper at the bottom, reflected a "very ... Japanese style", resembling the silhouette of a hakama. Early renditions of Cloud's weapon, the Buster Sword depicted a smaller, thinner blade. Square's staff conceived of a minigame involving Cloud driving a motorcycle at the start of the game's development, and Nomura's illustrations included Cloud riding a "Hardy-Daytona" (ハーディ＝デイトナ, Hādi-Deitona), a Shinra motorcycle based on a real-life motorbike, the Yamaha VMAX.

=== Further development ===
==== Advent Children characterization ====
Cloud was redesigned for the 2005 film Final Fantasy VII: Advent Children and had his Buster Sword replaced with the pictured Fusion Swords and bike Fenrir.

For Advent Children, Nomura agreed to direct the project, largely because of his attachment to Cloud's character. Although Nomura stated that Cloud was a more positive character in Final Fantasy VII than in Advent Children, he did not believe that such an "'upbeat' image of him is what stuck in the minds of the fans", and the script was written to explain why Cloud returned to a state of mind "consistent with the fans' view of him". Nomura describes Cloud's life as peaceful but one which he grew scared of losing, hurt by the losses he experienced during the original game. Blaming himself for things outside of his control, Cloud needed to overcome himself, Nomura elaborated. In contrast to other heroes, who Nomura see as typically possessing character defects amounting only to quirks, he believed Cloud's weakness to be humanizing.

Nojima viewed the theme of the story as one of forgiveness, which he believed required hardship; by taking up his sword and fighting, Cloud struggles to achieve it. Nojima sought to establish Cloud's withdrawn personality by depicting him as having a cell phone but never answering any calls. He originally intended for Aerith's name to be the last one displayed in the backlog of ignored messages that appear as Cloud's cell phone sinks into the water, but the scene was altered because it "sounded too creepy". The wolf, which Cloud imagines, "represents the deepest part of Cloud's psyche" and "appears in response to some burden that Cloud is carrying deep in his heart", vanishing at the film's end. One of the film's final scenes, in which Cloud smiles, is cited by Nomura to be his favorite, who highlighted the lack of dialogue and Cloud's embarrassment. The scene influenced the film's score, written by composer Nobuo Uematsu, who grew excited after coming across it in his review of the script and commented on the difficulty players who had finished Final Fantasy VII would have had imagining Cloud's smile.

Nomura sought to make Cloud's design distinctly different from the other characters. About thirty different designs were made for Cloud's face, and his hair was altered to give it a more realistic look and illustrate that two years had passed since the game's conclusion. The staff attempted rendering Cloud based on the game's original illustrations, but concluded that doing so left his eyes unrealistically big, which "looked gross". Further revisions were made to Cloud's face after completion of the pilot film, which featured a more realistic style. In contrast to his hair, Cloud's clothes were difficult to make in the film. After deciding to give Cloud a simple costume consistent with the concept of "clothes designed for action", the staff began with the idea of a black robe, eventually parring it down to a "long apron" shifted to one side.

Cloud's weaponry was based on the joking observation that because his sword in the original game was already enormously tall, in the sequel, he should use sheer numbers. Referred to as "The Fusion Swords" (合体剣, Gattai Ken) during the film's development, early storyboard concepts included Cloud carrying six swords on his back, although the idea was later modified to six interlocking swords. While the idea was not "logically thought out" and the staff did not think that they could "make it work physically", it was believed to provide "an interesting accent to the story". Cloud's new motorcycle, Fenrir (フェンリル, Fenriru), was designed by Takayuki Takeya, who was asked by the staff to design an upgraded version of Cloud's "Hardy-Daytona" motorcycle from Final Fantasy VII. The bike got bigger as development continued, with Takeya feeling its heaviness provided an impact that worked well within the film. In the original game, Cloud's strongest technique was the Omnislash (超究武神覇斬, Choukyūbushinhazan; lit. "Super-ultimate War-god Commanding Slash"). For his fight against Sephiroth in the film, Nomura proposed a new move, the Omnislash Ver. 5 (超究武神覇斬ver.5, Choukyūbushinhazan ver.5), a faster version of the original Omnislash. The staff laughed at the name of Cloud's move during the making of it, as Nomura was inspired by a sports move from Final Fantasy X, in which the protagonist, Tidus, explains the addition of a more specific name would make people more excited.

Themes expanded upon in the director's cut Advent Children Complete include Cloud's development with links to other Final Fantasy VII media in which he has appearances. To further focus on Cloud's growth, Square decided to give him more scenes when he interacts with children. Additionally, the fight between Cloud and Sephiroth was expanded by several minutes and includes a scene in which Sephiroth impales Cloud on his sword and holds him in the air, mirroring the scene in the game where he performs the same action. The decision to feature Cloud suffering from blood loss in the fight was made to make his pain feel realistic.

==== Remake ====
For the development of the fighting game Dissidia: Final Fantasy, Nomura stated that Cloud's appearance was slightly slimmer than in Final Fantasy VII because of the detail the 3D of the PlayStation Portable could give him. While also retaining his original design and his Advent Children appearance, Cloud was given a more distinct look based on his Final Fantasy VII persona.

Cloud's initial redesign for Final Fantasy VII Remake was later altered to more closely resemble Nomura's original design. Kazushige Nojima worked on making Cloud's interactions with Tifa and Barret Wallace natural. Despite fear of the possible result, Nojima also wanted players to connect with the character once again. Kitase further claimed that they aimed to make Cloud more inexperienced and informal than in Advent Children, due to him not being fully mature. Early on in Final Fantasy VII, Cloud crossdresses to find Tifa, and Nomura noted this event was popular with the fans and reassured that the scene would be present in Remake.

Co-director Naoki Hamaguchi noted that since the original game offered the option for the player to decide Cloud's interest in a female character, he wanted to retain this choice decision in Remake in the form of an intimate conversation when splitting from the main team. The theme song "Hollow" is meant to reflect Cloud's state of mind, with Nomura placing high emphasis on the rock music and male vocals.

=== Voice actors ===
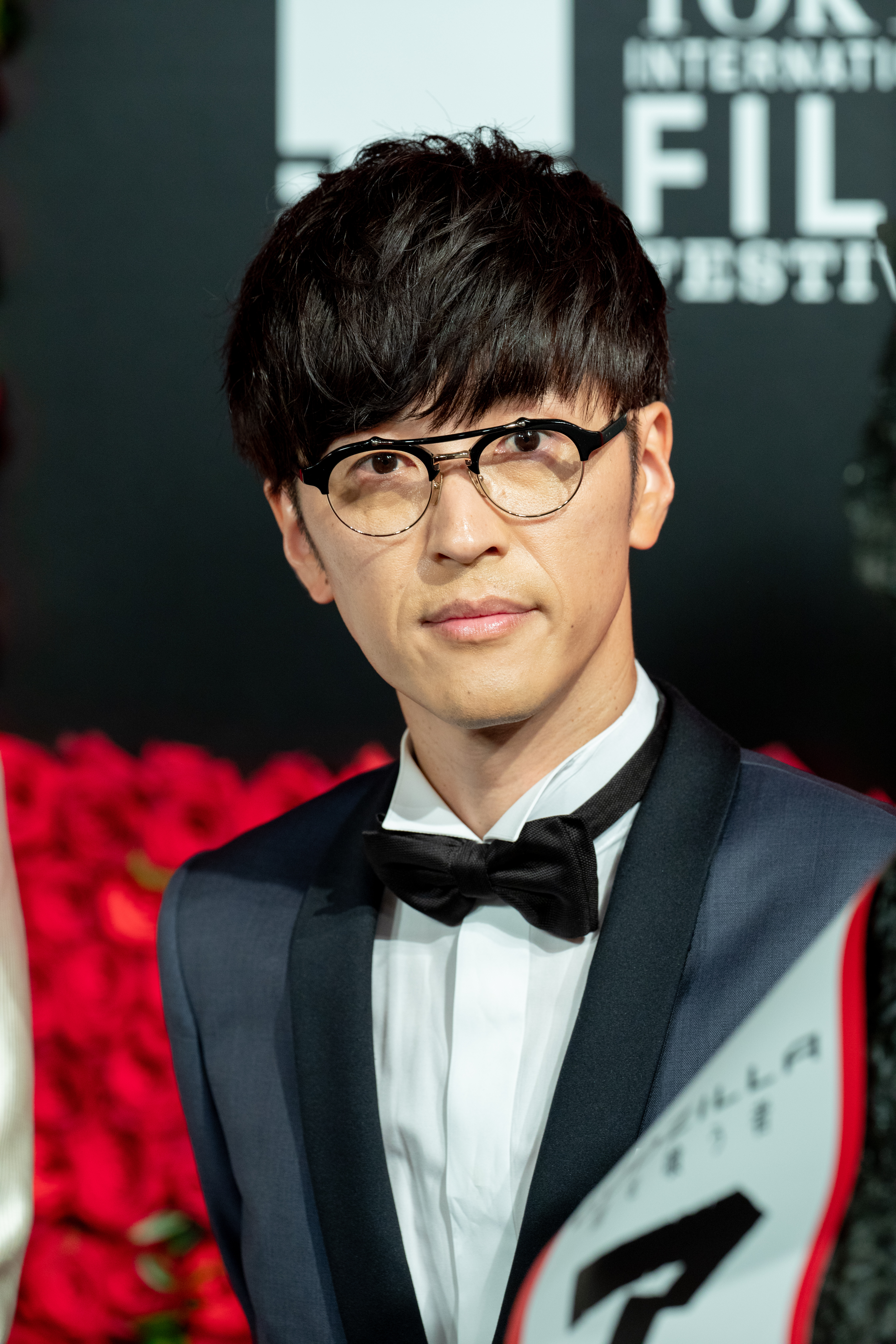
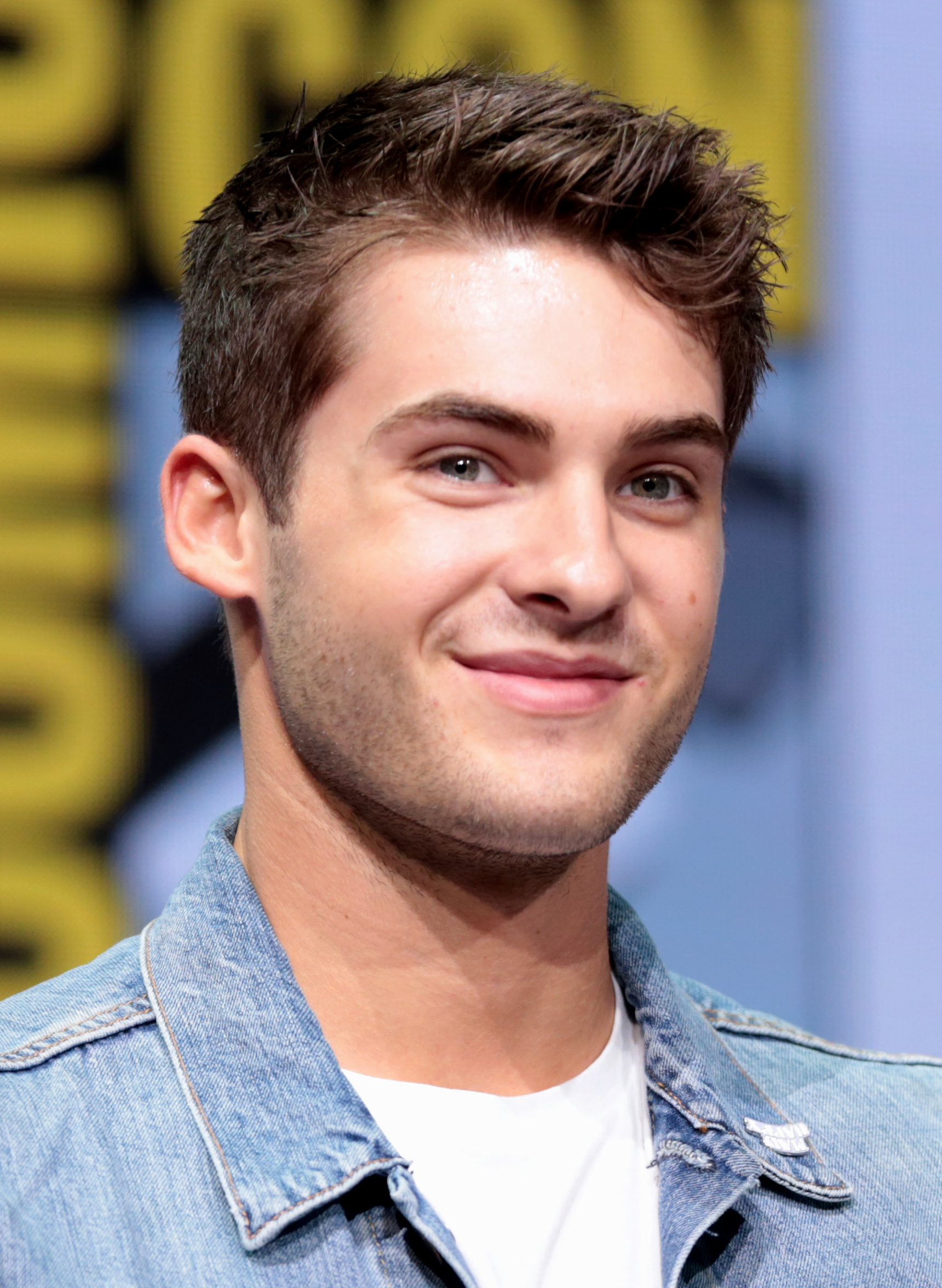
Takahiro Sakurai (left) is the Japanese voice actor for Cloud Strife in the majority of Final Fantasy media and other appearances. Cody Christian (right) provides the English voice of Cloud in the Final Fantasy VII Remake series.

The original Final Fantasy VII did not have voice acting. For the Ehrgeiz fighting game, Kenyu Horiuchi voiced Cloud in the arcade version and Nozomu Sasaki voiced him in the home console version. Since Kingdom Hearts, Takahiro Sakurai has been the Japanese voice of Cloud, with Teruaki Sugawara, the voice director at Square, recommending him to Nomura based on prior experience. Nomura had originally asked Sakurai to play the protagonist of The Bouncer, Sion Barzahd, but found that his voice best suited Cloud after hearing him speak. Sakurai received the script without any accompanying visuals, and first arrived for recording under the impression that he would be voicing a character other than Cloud. For Advent Children, Nomura wanted to contrast Cloud and Vincent Valentine's voices because of their similar personalities. As a sequel to the highly popular Final Fantasy VII, Sakurai felt greater pressure performing the role than he did when he voiced Cloud for Kingdom Hearts. Sakurai received comments from colleagues revealing their love of the game, some of them jokingly threatening that they would not forgive him if he did not meet their expectations.

During recording, Sakurai was told that "[n]o matter what kind of odds are stacked against him, Cloud won't be shaken". Sakurai says that while he recorded most of his work individually, he performed alongside Ayumi Ito, who voiced Tifa, for a few scenes. These recordings left him feeling "deflated", as the "exchanges he has with Tifa can be pretty painful", with Sakurai commenting that Cloud—whom he empathized with as his voice actor—has a hard time dealing with straight talk. Sakurai says that there were scenes that took over a year to complete, with precise directions being given requiring multiple takes.

According to Sakurai, Cloud's silence conveys more about him than when he speaks. While possessing heroic characteristics, Sakurai describes Cloud's outlook as negative, and says that he is delicate in some respects. A fan of VII, Sakurai had believed Cloud to be a colder character based on his original impression of him, but later came to view him as more sentimental. After the final product was released, Sakurai was anxious to hear the fans' response, whether positive or negative, and says that most of the feedback he received praised him. While recording Crisis Core, Sakurai felt that Cloud, though still introverted, acted more like a normal teenager, and modified his approach accordingly. Cloud's scream over Zack's death left a major impression on Sakurai, who says that he worked hard to convey the emotional tone of the ending. Sakurai has come to regard Cloud as an important role, commenting that Cloud reminds him of his own past, and that, as a Final Fantasy VII fan himself, he is happy to contribute.

For the remake of Final Fantasy VII, Sakurai found Cloud more difficult to portray than his previous performances. He re-recorded his lines multiple times, and credited the voice director with guiding him. Nomura elaborated that the remake's interpretation of Cloud has a distinct personality; he attempts to act cool, but often fails to do so and instead comes across as awkward, which Nomura asked Sakurai to reflect in his acting. Another challenge for the developers was finding a suitable voice for the teenage Cloud seen during flashbacks. To better match Cloud's rural upbringing, they decided to hire a child from a rural area rather than an established actor, and ultimately went with 13-year-old Yukihiro Aizawa.

In most English adaptations, Cloud is voiced by Steve Burton, who was first hired to voice Cloud after a Square employee saw his role in the 2001 film The Last Castle. Burton's work as Cloud in Advent Children served as his first feature-length role, an experience he enjoyed. Calling the character a rare opportunity for him as an actor, Burton describes Cloud as having a "heaviness about him". Burton says he is surprised when fans recognize him for his work as Cloud, whom he has referred to as "[one of the] coolest characters there is", and considers himself lucky to have voiced him.

Although Burton expressed his desire to voice Cloud for the remake of Final Fantasy VII, he was replaced by Cody Christian; Burton thanked Square for his work, and wished Christian luck. Christian said that he was honored to portray what he described as an iconic character, and vowed to give his best performance. He also commented on Burton's previous work, stating, "Steve, you paved the way. You made this character what it is and have contributed in shaping a legacy". Christian used Burton's works as an inspiration for his portrayal of the character. Teenage Cloud was voiced in English by Major Dodson. For the next installment, Christian said that the character differed from Remake as he aimed to explore more his sensitive side like his past or intimate relationships he is often involved.

== Appearances ==
=== In Final Fantasy VII ===
Cloud is introduced as a 21-year-old mercenary employed by AVALANCHE, an eco-terrorist group opposed to the Shinra Company, and who claims to be formerly of SOLDIER 1st Class, an elite Shinra fighting unit. Beginning the game with the placeholder name "Ex-SOLDIER" (元ソルジャー, Moto Sorujā), Cloud assists AVALANCHE's leader, Barret Wallace, in bombing one of the Mako reactors, power plants which drain the planet's "Lifestream". Despite appearing detached and more interested in the pay of his work, Cloud demonstrates moments of camaraderie, such as prioritizing Jessie's security over his escape during the Mako Reactor 1's explosion. Players can choose to interact in a friendlier manner with AVALANCHE's members. After being approached by his childhood friend and AVALANCHE member, Tifa Lockhart, Cloud agrees to continue helping AVALANCHE. Cloud encounters Aerith Gainsborough, a resident of Midgar's slums, and agrees to serve as her bodyguard in exchange for a date. He helps her evade Shinra, who are pursuing her because she is the sole survivor of a race known as the Cetra. During the course of their travels, a love triangle develops between Cloud, Tifa, and Aerith.

Following the player's departure from Midgar, Cloud narrates his history with Sephiroth, a legendary member of SOLDIER and the game's primary antagonist, and the events that led to his disappearance five years prior. Cloud joined SOLDIER to emulate Sephiroth, and explains that he would sign up for a "big mission" whenever they became available, as the conclusion of Shinra's war with the people of Wutai ended his chances for military fame. Sephiroth started questioning his humanity after accompanying him on a job to Cloud's hometown of Nibelheim and discovering documents concerning Jenova, an extraterrestrial lifeform and Sephiroth's "mother". This ultimately led to Sephiroth burning down Nibelheim, killing Cloud's mother. Cloud confronted Sephiroth at Mt. Nibel's Mako Reactor and was believed to have killed him, but Cloud dismisses this as a lie, as he knows he would be no match for Sephiroth. He is troubled by the fact that although he most likely would have lost the fight, he lived after challenging Sephiroth.

Numerous visual and audio clues suggest the unreliability of Cloud's memory. Cloud will spontaneously remember words or scenes from his past, sometimes collapsing to the ground while cradling his head, and appears not to remember things that he should, such as the existence of a SOLDIER First Class named Zack. As Sephiroth begins manipulating his mind, he takes advantage of his memory by telling him that his past is merely fiction and that Shinra created him in an attempt to clone Sephiroth. Cloud learns he cannot remember things such as how or when he joined SOLDIER and resigns himself as a "failed experiment", then goes missing. The party later discovers a comatose Cloud suffering from Mako poisoning.

It is revealed that Cloud never qualified for SOLDIER and instead enlisted as an infantryman in Shinra's army. During the mission to Nibelheim, he served under Sephiroth and Zack and hid his identity from the townspeople out of embarrassment. Following Sephiroth's defeat of Zack at the Mt. Nibel Mako reactor, Cloud managed to ambush him and throw him into the Lifestream, believing him to be dead. Both he and Zack were imprisoned by Shinra's lead scientist, Professor Hojo, for four years of experimentation. Zack later escaped with Cloud to the outskirts of Midgar before Shinra soldiers gunned him down. As a result of exposure to Mako radiation and the injection of Jenova's cells, Cloud's mind created a false personality based on Zack's, inadvertently erasing the latter from his memory. After piecing together his identity, Cloud resumes his role as leader and silently expresses his mutual romantic feelings with Tifa the night before the final battle. At the game's conclusion, Sephiroth reappears in Cloud's mind a final time but is defeated in a one-on-one fight.

=== In Compilation of Final Fantasy VII ===
Cloud appears in a minor role in the mobile game Before Crisis, a prequel set six years before the events of Final Fantasy VII. The player, a member of the Shinra covert operatives group, the Turks, encounters Cloud during his time as a Shinra infantryman working to join SOLDIER. The game portrays Cloud's natural talent for swordsmanship, and recounts his role during Nibelheim's destruction.

In the 2005 animated film Advent Children, which is set two years after the conclusion of Final Fantasy VII, Cloud lives with Tifa in the city of Edge along with Marlene, Barret's adopted daughter, and Denzel, an orphan affected by a rampant and deadly disease called Geostigma. Having given up his life as a mercenary, Cloud now works as a courier for the "Strife Delivery Service" (ストライフ・デリバリーサービス, Sutoraifu Deribarī Sābisu), which Tifa set up in her new bar. After Tifa confronts him following the disappearance of Denzel and Marlene, it is revealed that he also suffers from the effects of Geostigma, and he responds that he is unfit to protect his friends and new family.

However, after Tifa urges him to let go of the past, Cloud sets out for the Forgotten City in search of the children. There, he confronts Kadaj, Loz, and Yazoo, genetic remnants of Sephiroth left behind before he diffused into the Lifestream completely. Cloud's battle with Kadaj takes them back to Aerith's church, where Cloud recovers from his Geostigma with Aerith's help. After merging with the remains of Jenova, Kadaj, resurrects Sephiroth. Cloud, having overcome his doubts, defeats Sephiroth once more, leaving a dying Kadaj in his place. At the film's conclusion, Cloud, seeing Aerith and Zack, assures them that he will be fine and reunites with his friends.

Cloud appears in On the Way to a Smile, a series of short stories set between Final Fantasy VII and Advent Children. "Case of Tifa" serves as an epilogue to VII, and portrays Cloud's life alongside Tifa, Marlene, and Denzel. "Case of Denzel" relates how Cloud first met Denzel, and was later adapted as a short original video animation for the release of Advent Children Complete, On the Way to a Smile - Episode: Denzel.

Cloud appears in a supporting role in the PlayStation 2 game Dirge of Cerberus. A year after the events of Advent Children, Cloud, working alongside Barret and Tifa, lends his support to the ground forces of the World Regenesis Organization and his ally Vincent Valentine in their siege of Midgar and counterattack against the rogue Shinra military unit Deepground.

In the PlayStation Portable game Crisis Core, Cloud is presented as a young Shinra infantryman who befriends Zack. During the game's conclusion, a dying Zack gives Cloud his Buster Sword, telling him that he is his legacy. The game ends with Cloud heading to Midgar, reprising the start of Final Fantasy VII. Zack and Cloud's connection was meant to be expanded upon near the game's ending, with both of them planning to flee to Midgar, but due to limitations in the console's hardware, these scenes could not be implemented and they instead decided to focus on Zack.

Cloud reprises his role in the 2020 game Final Fantasy VII Remake, which is part of a planned trilogy of games remaking the original 1997 game. While marketed as a remake to the original game, Square claims that there are other different meanings in this game. He was featured once more as the protagonist in Final Fantasy VII Rebirth.

=== In Kingdom Hearts ===
Nomura redesigned Cloud for his appearance in Kingdom Hearts. He is depicted with a crimson cape and a clawed version of his left-handed glove, while the Buster Sword's blade is wrapped in bandages. Nomura stated that Cloud's left arm was inspired by Vincent Valentine, and explained that he wanted to give the character a more demon-like appearance due to his ties to the dark side in the game. Nomura also stated that he wanted to leave the question of whether Cloud was searching for Aerith open to the player's interpretation. In the first game, Kingdom Hearts, Hades hires Cloud to kill Hercules, fighting Sora as a prerequisite. After the fight, Hades sends Cerberus to attack Cloud and Sora, whom Hercules saves. Cloud meets with Sora afterward and explains that he is searching for someone. In Kingdom Hearts: Final Mix, there is an additional scene where he battles Sephiroth. During the credits, Cloud is shown reuniting with the residents of Hollow Bastion. A memory-based version of Cloud appears in the Game Boy Advance sequel Kingdom Hearts: Chain of Memories as a boss in Olympus Coliseum and later as a summon card for Sora.

Cloud reappears in Kingdom Hearts II, depicted with his Advent Children design. He is searching for Sephiroth, and in turn Tifa is searching for him. Cloud fights alongside Leon's team during the Heartless invasion of Hollow Bastion. Should the player choose to engage Sephiroth and win the battle, Cloud returns and fights Sephiroth, which ends with both of them disappearing in a flash of light after Tifa gives Cloud her support. Sora concludes that Cloud is still fighting with Sephiroth, and will not stop until he is defeated. A digital replica of Cloud also appears in Kingdom Hearts Coded in the Olympus Coliseum, helping Sora and Hercules battle Hades. Cloud also appears in the Kingdom Hearts manga adaptations, reprising his original role.

=== In other media ===
Cloud appears in the Last Order: Final Fantasy VII, an original video animation (OVA) that serves as an alternate retelling of Nibelheim's destruction and Zack and Cloud's escape from Shinra imprisonment. Several scenes diverge from Final Fantasy VII's depiction of events, such as reinterpreting Cloud's rescue of Tifa by having her view his face. Although it is associated with and makes references to the Compilation of Final Fantasy VII, Last Order is considered an outside work and not part of the original continuity.

Cloud has also appeared in various games outside of the Final Fantasy VII continuity. He is a playable character in the PlayStation version of Ehrgeiz. In Chocobo Racing, Cloud is a hidden character who rides a motorcycle. Cloud is one of several playable Final Fantasy VII characters in Itadaki Street Special for the PlayStation 2 and Itadaki Street Portable for the PlayStation Portable.

Cloud also features in the LittleBigPlanet fan remake of Final Fantasy VII created by Jamie Colliver. Colliver’s adaptation reimagines the entire original PS1 game as a platformer. Cloud is a playable character representing Final Fantasy VII in the rhythm game Theatrhythm Final Fantasy, with his Advent Children persona serving as downloadable content. Players in Final Fantasy Explorers can briefly transform into Cloud, enabling use of his Omnislash Limit Break from FFVII.

Cloud is the protagonist of Final Fantasy VII G-Bike, a mobile game for which Nomura designed a new costume for him. This was inspired by Cloud's Advent Children fights which producer Ichiro Hazama thought was "very cool, and radical", and influences from the title went into the game. CyberConnect2 CEO Hiroshi Matsuyama sought to improve Cloud's popularity with this game.

Cloud appears as a playable guest character in the 2014 Nintendo crossover fighting games Super Smash Bros. for Nintendo 3DS and Wii U, sporting his character designs from both Final Fantasy VII and Advent Children. According to game director Masahiro Sakurai, Final Fantasy characters were heavily requested to appear in the Super Smash Bros. series, with Cloud receiving the most support out of all of them. While other characters from the Final Fantasy series were considered, Sakurai ultimately felt that none of them could match Cloud's popularity and he could not imagine including a different character. His model was primarily based on his appearance in the Dissidia series, with slight alterations under Nomura's supervision. Cloud was made available as in-game downloadable content alongside a stage based on Midgar in December 2015. A pair of Cloud amiibo figures were released in July 2017. He returned as a playable character in Super Smash Bros. Ultimate (2018). As part of the update adding Sephiroth to the game as downloadable content in December 2020, Cloud was given his "Omnislash Ver. 5" to use against opponents, being exclusive to his Advent Children costumes.

Cloud was considered for inclusion as a guest character in the PlayStation 2 version of Soulcalibur II, but Heihachi Mishima from Tekken ultimately took the spot instead.

In the PlayStation game Final Fantasy Tactics and its PlayStation Portable update, The War of the Lions, Cloud is accidentally pulled into the world of Ivalice by an ancient machine called "the Celestial Globe", which was activated by Ramza Beoulve. Cloud is disoriented after arriving in Ramza's world, and after a short exchange with Ramza and the others, he leaves. He wanders into Zarghidas Trade City, where he encounters a flower girl named Aerith. As Cloud is leaving the area, Aerith is accosted by a man demanding payment. Cloud returns to help Aerith escape, and Ramza and his party catch up to him. After the battle, he joins Ramza's party as a playable character. Cloud also appears as an enemy unit in the "Brave Story" series of battles as part of Rendezvous, the unlockable cooperative multiplayer mode in The War of the Lions.

Cloud serves as the representative hero of Final Fantasy VII in Dissidia Final Fantasy, a fighting game featuring characters from the Final Fantasy series. He is depicted in his FFVII design, while his Advent Children design is also available. His fight against Sephiroth in this game is based on their battles from VII and Advent Children. Along with the entire cast, Cloud reappears in the prequel Dissidia 012 as a Warrior of Chaos. Concerned for Tifa, who is on the opposing side, Cloud tries to defeat Chaos alone; after nearly being killed, he is saved by the goddess Cosmos, and becomes one of her warriors. Cloud's main outfit is based on Yoshitaka Amano's original artwork concept, while his Kingdom Hearts outfit appears as downloadable content. Cloud again appears as a playable character opposite Sephiroth in the series' third entry, Dissidia NT, wearing his Advent Children outfit. The development staff worked carefully to translate Cloud's original moves from his previous role, most notably his swordplay Omnislash which was developed to be his strongest move.

Although Cloud does not appear in Lightning Returns: Final Fantasy XIII, his Final Fantasy VII attire appears as an alternative for the main character alongside the Buster Sword. Cloud's hairstyle and Advent Children outfit are also present in Final Fantasy XIV: A Realm Reborn. His original attire is also present in the mobile phone game Mobius Final Fantasy, and Final Fantasy Explorers-Force.

== Legacy ==
Cloud has been merchandised extensively, in many different forms, including figurines and jewelry. In commemoration of the franchise's 20th anniversary, Square released figurines of him alongside other Final Fantasy protagonists. Square Enix's manager of merchandise, Kanji Tashiro, said at the 2008 San Diego Comic-Con that Cloud's likeness has produced some of the company's best-selling items, and that fans could look forward to further adaptations of the character in the future. Popular models at the time included Cloud's Advent Children figurine and Final Fantasy VII Hardy-Daytona bike set, both of which sold particularly well in European and North American markets. Square has also released two promotional books primarily focusing on Cloud's character: Cloud vol.1, which was released in 2007, and Cloud message, in 2008. In 2013, a replica of the Buster Sword was created by blacksmith Tony Swatton for the webseries Man at Arms.

=== Critical reception ===
==== Portrayal in Final Fantasy VII ====
Cloud has been mostly well received by critics. In his review of the PC release of Final Fantasy VII, Ron Dulin of GameSpot commented that "a simple understatement will have to suffice: Cloud is easily the most interesting and complex character ever presented in a game". RPGamer's Aujang Abadi called Cloud "one of the most complex characters Square has created", as well as "the first truly complicated main character". Sharon Packer identifies Cloud as having mental illness in the form of dissociative identity disorder (DID), while Katie Whitlock identifies him as having involuntary memory resulting from post-traumatic stress disorder (PTSD). The book Japanese Culture Through Videogames addresses Cloud as a complex fictional character, comparing him with Metal Gear's Solid Snake, Final Fantasy VI's Terra Branford, and Tekken's Jin Kazama due to his identity issues. Kurt Kalata of Gamasutra stated that Cloud is "somewhat of a weakling" with grandiose delusions and other psychological issues. He also called Cloud one of the first unreliable narrators in a role-playing video game. According to Patrick Holleman, "no RPG has ever deliberately betrayed the connection between protagonist and player like FFVII does". The game's use of the unreliable narrator literary concept has drawn comparisons to films such as Fight Club (1999), The Sixth Sense (1999), American Psycho (2000), and Memento (2000), with Patrick Holleman and Jeremy Parish arguing that the game takes the unreliable narrator concept a step further by establishing a connection between the player and the protagonist. Jack Ridsdale of PCGamesN argues that Cloud is a deconstruction of the hero archetype and toxic masculinity, and compares the plot twist about his true identity to that of Fight Club. In Alana Hagues from RPGFan said Cloud's shock when Sephiroth kills Aerith has a major impact on her as Cloud properly expresses depression over death, something no video game has ever done to her. While Cloud is never addressed as a God, he has to protect the peace as Sephiroth plays the role of Satan and his Shadow, with Cloud having to surpass him in the narrative.

In the book Transnational Contexts of Culture, Gender, Class, and Colonialism in Play, Alexis Pulos Lee compared the Western critical response handling of the two Nier incarnations for the protagonist involving a middle-aged man and a young slender man to the way Westerners view Cloud alongside his nemesis, Sephiroth, as overly feminine and Japanese due to the handling of masculinity depending on regions. This is reinforced by how Westerners tend to portray Final Fantasy VII characters in Machinima parodies of the game in a negative fashion. The father avatar is seen as an unfitting Japanese protagonist, while the brother is instead seen as more fitting for Japanese audiences due to how his design is more fitting with the Final Fantasy fans. Cloud's respective relationships with Aerith and Tifa were also popular with writers.

==== Portayal in the Final Fantasy VII remakes ====
During anticipation for the remake of Final Fantasy VII, TechSpot noted fans were interested in Cloud's love interests but claimed that Cloud's relationship with Aerith was subtle in retrospective. Despite noting his antisocial and aloof attitudes in the remake, In a feature article, GameSpot compared Cloud with Kazuma Kiryu from Sega's Yakuza video game series due to both sharing similar features and development across the narrative through Midgar's cities as both protagonists have a tendency to help civilians. His characterization was compared by Nahrah Jamal from Mothership with other stoic who were defined by endurance like Vegeta from Dragon Ball, Sasuke Uchiha from Naruto and Dart Field from The Legend of Dragoon. His androgynous design and personality were called complex for how it challenges Western culture and the player has the power to make him either romance with Tifa and Aerith or with nobody in Rebirth which can result into queer interpretations. Digital Trend saw Cloud's failures to save Aerith as a story about dealing with trauma as the returning player find a possible way to stop Aerith's death like Cloud attempts and instead ends in tragedy again. Cloud's rivalry with Sephiroth was also the subject of praise in Rebirth as it allows two characters be allies before the latter becomes the antagonist while the former comes across as a rookie in comparison.

The popularity of Cloud's relationships, how they were written and their partial ties to the original game's affinity mechanics have led to multiple instances of fan creations, fandom debates and "shipping wars," with many debating and arguing topics ranging from Tifa and Aerith's compatibility with Cloud to the canonicity and intent of his feelings towards either heroine through story and character analysis and authorial or supplemental materials (such as the Ultimanias, developer interviews and tie-in novels) across much of the Compilation of Final Fantasy VII in the years since the original game's release. RPGamer writer Marie Freed stated that she saw Tifa's loyalty and love for Cloud, even in the light of having to relive her own traumas, as admirable, and a welcome contrast to the "destined" romance seen in previous title Final Fantasy IV. Siliconera writer Cory Dinkel claimed that Final Fantasy VII has no love triangle by the game's end due to multiple story and character developments and revelations surrounding Cloud, Tifa, Aerith and Zack, and that the former two's relationship is the truly canonical romance of all of their respective pairings, despite the suggested complexity surrounding it in the sequel film Advent Children. These particular relationship aspects, as well as other facets spanning the entire main cast of the Final Fantasy VII franchise, were given more prominence within the character writing and story of Final Fantasy VII Remake and Final Fantasy VII Rebirth, with the latter having a major emphasis on Cloud's relationships through expanded characterization and more apparent affinity mechanics. Final Fantasy VII Rebirth also revamped the Gold Saucer date between Cloud and a chosen partner, prompting additional analysis and discourse on the nature of Cloud's relationships.

For his performance as Cloud in Final Fantasy VII Remake, Cody Christian received a nomination for "Performer in a Leading Role" at the 17th British Academy Games Awards. For the 2024 Golden Joystick Awards, Christian won "Best Lead Performer" for his work as Cloud in Final Fantasy VII Rebirth.

==== Other responses ====
Cloud's redesign in Kingdom Hearts was praised as being the best in the game by Animefringe. His development in Advent Children was praised by DVD Talk. In regards to the remains of Midgar from Advent Children, Destructoid noted the message within its writing regarding the characters' lives in Midgar, as its people are able to move on with their lives, but Cloud is unable to due to past trauma over Aerith's death. Kotaku saw the focus on Midgar's ruins as a parallel with psychological trauma due to how some of its survivors suffer from Geostigma, a disease that cannot be fought physically. Joystiq's Andrew Yoon opined that the director's cut version of the film provides more depth to Cloud's development, taking advantage of its longer runtime by better "humanizing [him]". GamesRadar stated that while Cloud felt like a "miserable" character in the film, him coming to terms with his past was appealing alongside his new swords stored in his bike. Yoshinori Kitase said that the fight between Cloud and Sephiroth was popular enough to make Japanese gamers do a remake of it in Dissidia Final Fantasy and expected Western fans would also emulate it. Meristation praised Cloud's new appearance in Advent Children and how it came across appealing in the spin-off Dirge of Cerberus, despite him having less screentime due to the narrative focusing on Vincent.

When deciding on using a Final Fantasy representative for Super Smash Bros. for Nintendo 3DS and Wii U, Nomura and Super Smash Bros. series creator and director Masahiro Sakurai quickly agreed with adding Cloud to the cast. This was mostly because of Cloud's high popularity within the series in contrast to other Final Fantasy characters like Bartz or Terra, and multiple requests from fans of the character. According to Sakurai, he envisioned Cloud as being a relatively easy to play character in anticipation of a large variety of players using him, and stated that the Buster Sword served as a lynchpin in regard to developing his sword swings. Cloud's popularity and addition to the Super Smash Bros. series generated multiple responses, most notably in Twitter's trends. Although The Verge pointed out that the series had featured other third-party characters like Solid Snake, Mega Man, and Sonic the Hedgehog, they nevertheless expressed surprise over Cloud's inclusion because of Final Fantasy VII's lack of release on a Nintendo console. Despite that, he was well received.

=== Cultural impact ===
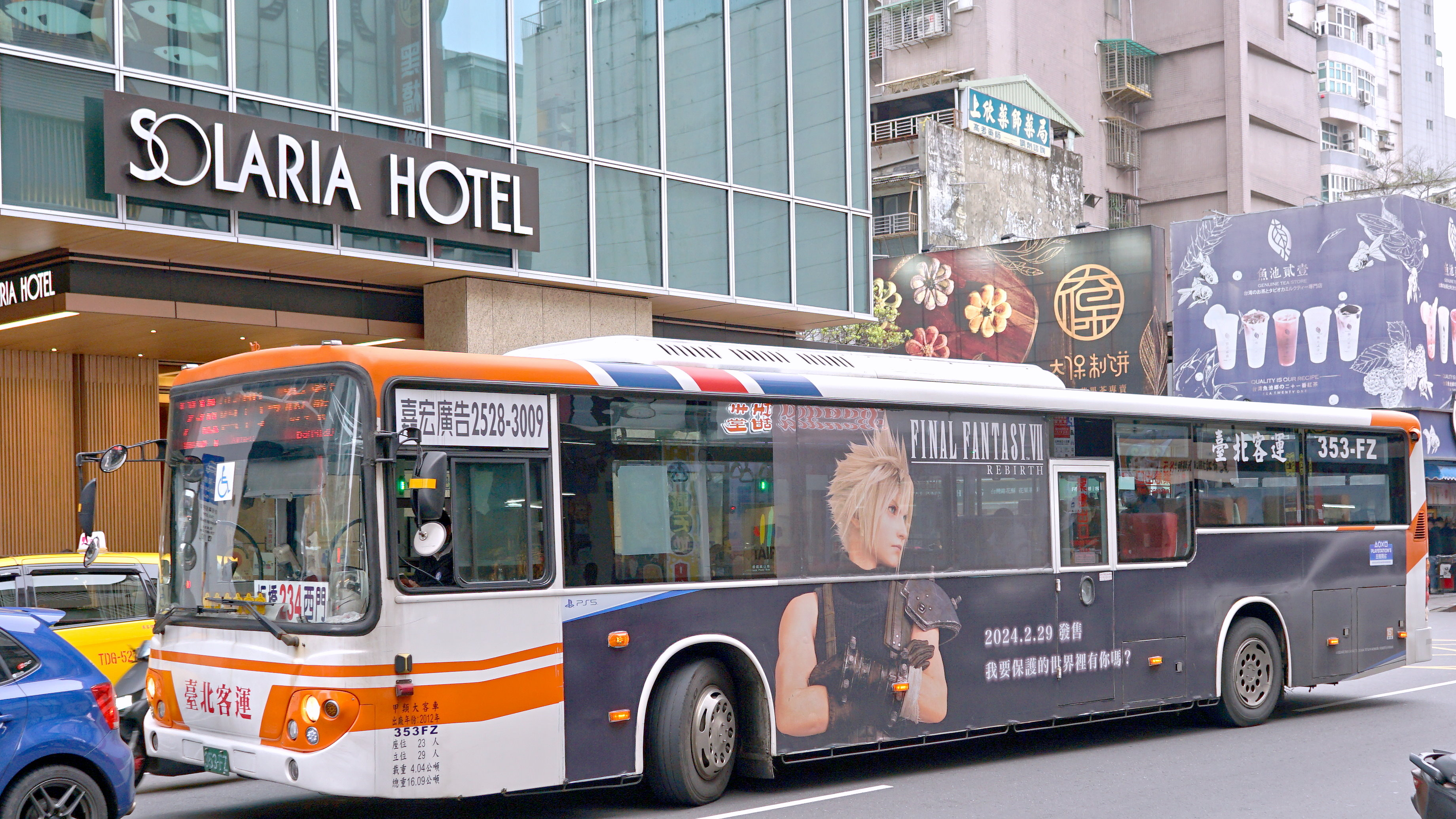
Cloud's image being used in a Taipei bus advertising

Cloud set a trend in the Final Fantasy series in regards to the characterization of main characters. Following Final Fantasy VII, Nomura designed Squall Leonhart, the lead of Final Fantasy VIII giving him a similar anti-hero persona. Tasked with creating a "female version of Cloud" for Final Fantasy XIII, Nomura designed Lightning with Cloud's success in mind, stating that he "desired for her to be ... loved for a long time, like Cloud". After Lightning was voted as the most popular female character in the series by Japanese fans, Mollie Patterson of EGMNOW commented: "Some have also brought up that Lightning is kind of the female equivalent to Cloud, which might be why she gets so much love". For Final Fantasy X, the staff aimed for a more contrasting hero that would act more cheerful in the narrative, leading to the development of Tidus. Similarly, Nomura created Noctis Lucis Caelum for Final Fantasy XV to be more insecure than Cloud and Squall. When the game Nier failed to be a success in North America despite portraying an elder as a protagonist to appeal to Westerns, director Yoko Taro convinced other staff members to use instead a younger type for the English remaster version, using Cloud as an influence.

IGN stated that Cloud set a trend for role-playing video game heroes, describing his "spiky blond hair" and "gigantic Buster Sword" as "instantly identifiable icons, recognized by gamers around the world". Edge described Cloud as an example of "excellent design and characterization". In 2010, Famitsu published a seven-page tribute to Cloud, showcasing his many appearances throughout the years. He was named best character of all time in Dengeki PlayStation's 2007 "Den-Play Awards". GameSpot published a video titled "Greatest Game Hero: Cloud Strife" for his inclusion in their 2009 "All Time Greatest Game Hero" poll, showcasing scenes of Cloud in Advent Children.
