= Zack Fair =

Character in Final Fantasy

- Final Fantasy character
- Zack Fair in Crisis Core: Final Fantasy VII Reunion (2022)
- First appearance: Final Fantasy VII (1997)
- Last appearance: Final Fantasy VII Rebirth (2024)
- Created by: Kazushige Nojima
- Designed by: Tetsuya Nomura
- Voiced by: English: Rick Gomez (2006-2018); Caleb Pierce (2020-present); Japanese: Kenichi Suzumura; Nozomu Sasaki (Ehrgeiz)

In-universe information
- Weapon: Buster Sword
- Home: Gongaga

Zack Fair (Japanese: ザックス・フェア, Hepburn: Zakkusu Fea) is a character in the Final Fantasy role-playing video game series by Square Enix (originally Square). He is first introduced as a non-player character in Final Fantasy VII (1997) and later appears in the Compilation of Final Fantasy VII works Before Crisis, Last Order, Advent Children and, most prominently, Crisis Core, a prequel to the original game which focuses on him and expands on his backstory.

Although Zack died before the events of Final Fantasy VII, is rarely mentioned, and only appears late into the story in flashbacks, he is a crucial part of the game's story, as following traumatic events involving them and Sephiroth, Cloud Strife unknowingly confused parts of his past with Zack's. While Cloud originally believes himself to be a member of the paramilitary organization SOLDIER, the military wing of the megacorporation Shinra, this story was in fact that of Zack, with Cloud being his friend and a regular soldier. Zack died in the weeks leading up to Final Fantasy VII's opening, sacrificing himself to protect Cloud from Shinra's army after they escaped from imprisonment; (Note: The scene of Zack's death is optional in the European and North American releases of Final Fantasy VII; otherwise, Zack appears to have died at the hands of Sephiroth earlier in the story, despite having canonically survived the encounter.) a mentally shaken Cloud's memories of the events were heavily affected, and he forgot Zack entirely.

Zack was not originally part of Final Fantasy VII's story during development, but scenario writer Kazushige Nojima wanted to bring a sense of mystery to the title, and created the character to help complicate Cloud's backstory. He was designed by Tetsuya Nomura, and his last name is derived from "fair weather", to contrast with Cloud's last name, Strife. With Zack's conceptual backstory in place for Final Fantasy VII, the staff decided to use Compilation of Final Fantasy VII to expand upon his character. Zack is voiced by Kenichi Suzumura in Japanese and Rick Gomez in English prior to Final Fantasy VII Remake, in which he is voiced by Caleb Pierce. Suzumura was chosen specifically by Nomura for his voice, and was given the role without an audition. Western critics have praised Zack's character, commenting on his development since Final Fantasy VII.

== Concept and creation ==
Zack did not exist in the original scenario of Final Fantasy VII, but was created when scenario writer Kazushige Nojima decided to add some mystery to the plot, most notably in relation to Cloud Strife's background. Nojima had always planned for Cloud's memories of his life to be proven false as the game went on, but he had not decided on how to implement this until he hit on the character of Zack. Nojima also used Zack to link Cloud and Aerith Gainsborough, as Zack was her first love and Cloud reminds her of him, thus creating an emotional connection between herself and Cloud. Originally, the role of her first love was to have been fulfilled by the game's antagonist Sephiroth as suggested by Nomura. As the game continued development, Nojima worked out the mysteries regarding Zack and Cloud, which led to some scenes needing revision. Director Yoshinori Kitase was surprised by the revelation of Cloud's and Zack's connection, as until the later stages of development, even he did not know about Zack. Character designer Tetsuya Nomura got the request to design Zack when Final Fantasy VII was reaching the end of development. Prior to the late addition of Zack, Nojima had asked the staff to add details to some scenes to hint at his existence, despite not revealing Zack's existence to the staff until later. The opportunity to write Crisis Core would gave Nojima the ability to expand on Zack's character and create a personality for him. Although Zack is linked with Cloud due to multiple parallels, Nojima stated that the personality of Zack was based on Final Fantasy X protagonist Tidus, as both are rarely bothered by their own thoughts and are generally cheerful.

For Final Fantasy VII: Advent Children, Zack made only a couple of brief appearances, and as such, was not difficult to animate; the team had also acquired his design early in production, allowing modeling of his character to be taken care of. Nomura had wanted Zack to have a "nice, upbeat voice", which influenced his decision to cast Kenichi Suzumura. Beforehand, Nomura had had dinner with Suzumura, where he had decided that "at that point [Nomura] wanted him to be in one of his projects if the opportunity ever presented itself". Suzumura was offered the role without an audition. Nomura explained that, because Zack had been chosen to be the lead in Last Order: Final Fantasy VII, he needed "someone who could handle [the] role well". The staff used Last Order as an opportunity to portray Zack "properly" as a "handsome, light-hearted man [who] was in everyone's memory". In English, Zack is voiced by Rick Gomez.

In an interview with IGN whilst promoting Crisis Core, Yoshinori Kitase explained that when the original game was created, Zack was a minor character, although Nomura had created art design, and Nojima had created a basic concept of Zack's story. Kitase further explained that "you could say that the idea [for the storyline of Crisis Core] has been cooking for 10 years". Before Crisis Core began development, the staff had planned to create a PlayStation Portable port of Before Crisis: Final Fantasy VII, but soon changed their minds to create a game that focused on Zack, whose fate was predetermined; fans knew how the game was going to end. Throughout the game, the staff decided to use a blue sky in cutscenes to represent Zack, while other features in such scenes are meant to symbolize his connections. Several of Zack's actions from the game were also designed so as to augment the similarities that Aerith finds between him and Cloud in Final Fantasy VII.

Due to Zack initially appearing as a younger person than in previous games, Suzumura was asked to portray Zack in a fashion that shows him to be naive for his character arc to be more noticeable, as he becomes more mature throughout the narrative. He wears the SOLDIER 1st class uniform, consisting of a black, sleeveless turtleneck, black boots, and armor. In Crisis Core, Zack has two outfits; his Final Fantasy VII outfit and a different outfit worn during the start of the game, which he changes after fighting Angeal Hewley. Originally, Zack was meant to wear red clothing until Tetsuya Nomura drew his black outfit. He was made as a conventional heroic character in contrast to Cloud, who was written as an unlikely hero. There was an attempt to make Zack's and Aerith's interactions appealing in Crisis Core. Zack's full name was first revealed in an article in Dengeki PlayStation. Nomura stated that Zack's name was derived from 'fair weather' and specifically chosen because it contrasted with Cloud Strife's name. Zack and Cloud's connection was also meant to be expanded upon near the game's ending, with both of them planning to flee to Midgar, but due to limitations in the console's hardware, these scenes could not be implemented, and instead, they decided to focus on Zack's role as a warrior. The game's remaster, Crisis Core Reunion, was developed as part of the Final Fantasy VII Remake project and acts as a prequel to the main trilogy designed to familiarize players with the story of Zack ahead of his appearance in Final Fantasy VII Rebirth, where he would play a more significant role.

== Appearances ==
Zack had a small role in the original Final Fantasy VII. He is first mentioned by name in Gongaga, his hometown, where his parents do not know what happened to him after he left to join SOLDIER, and are worried for his safety after not hearing from him for years. It is at this point that Aerith explains Zack was her first love. Cloud later realizes that some of his memories and aspects of his personality were actually Zack's, and not his own. Flashbacks reveal that both Zack and Cloud battled Sephiroth after he burned down the town of Nibelheim upon discovering he was born from a scientific experiment. After Cloud defeated Sephiroth, both Zack and Cloud were taken to be used in experiments by Shinra. Eventually, Zack awoke and was able to escape with a semi-conscious Cloud to the city of Midgar, but on the edge of the city, Shinra troops gunned him down. While the flashback showing Zack's and Cloud's escape is optional in the North American and European releases of Final Fantasy VII and the Japanese International version, it was originally planned to be shown once Cloud discovered the results of Shinra's experiments.

Zack's character and backstory is expanded upon throughout the Compilation of Final Fantasy VII. In the prequel game Before Crisis, Zack supports Shinra in their fight against the eco-terrorist group AVALANCHE. During the game, two of his SOLDIER acquaintances are captured and experimented upon, and Zack is able to bring them back to their senses but is unable to save them. Zack also appears during the chapter covering the Nibelheim incident, and later as a boss character when he and Cloud are fugitives from Shinra and are being pursued by the Turks. The OVA Last Order follows Zack and Cloud's journey to Midgar with flashbacks of the Nibelheim incident. Zack also has a small role in the film sequel Advent Children, where most of his appearances are flashbacks from Cloud's point of view. He also appears at the end of the film, where he and Aerith speak to Cloud. In the director's cut version, Advent Children Complete, his role is expanded, and he appears during Cloud's battle with Sephiroth. His death is also shown, where he gives Cloud the Buster Sword and tells him to become his "living legacy".

Zack is the protagonist of Crisis Core, a prequel to Final Fantasy VII, which deals primarily with his backstory. In the game, Zack is trained as a SOLDIER by his close friend, Angeal Hewley, and hopes to become a hero while working for Shinra. When Angeal, and another SOLDIER, Genesis Rhapsodos, betray Shinra, Zack and Sephiroth are dispatched to kill them, but decide to avoid doing that if possible. He and Sephiroth learn that both Angeal and Genesis were the result of a Shinra experiment called "Project G", where they were injected with Jenova cells prior to being born in an effort to create perfect SOLDIERs. However, both Angeal and Genesis are suffering from side effects, leading them to antagonize Shinra in the hopes of finding a cure. Over the course of the game, Zack befriends Cloud and begins dating Aerith. During a mission to find Angeal and Genesis, Angeal forces Zack to kill him, as he wants to stop hurting people because of his mutations. Before dying, Angeal thanks Zack for stopping him and gives him his Buster Sword. Later, while Zack and Sephiroth search for Genesis and the former Shinra scientist Dr. Hollander, they go to Nibelheim, where Sephiroth learns that he was the result of genetic experimentation involving Jenova. The game then depicts the Nibelheim incident, leading to Zack and Cloud being taken captive and subjected to experiments. Four years pass, Zack and Cloud are able to escape, and Zack learns that Genesis has come to believe the only way he can be cured is by being injected with Sephiroth's cells. As Sephiroth is presumed dead, the only source of these cells is Cloud, and Zack realises that Genesis plans to kill Cloud. Zack decides to stop Genesis, and after defeating him, he and Cloud head to Midgar, where he hopes to be reunited with Aerith. However, Zack and Cloud are intercepted by Shinra infantry, and Zack is killed. As he is dying, Zack bequeaths the Buster Sword to Cloud, telling him to be his living legacy. As Cloud heads towards Midgar, Zack is pulled into the sky by Angeal, and wonders if he has become a hero.

Zack has served as the basis for several forms of merchandise, such as being pictured on the Final Fantasy VII 10th Anniversary Potion soft drink cans. Outside the Final Fantasy VII series, Zack is an unlockable character in the PlayStation version of the fighting game Ehrgeiz, where is playable in arcade, versus, and minigame events. He made his debut appearance in the Kingdom Hearts series in the prequel Birth by Sleep for the PlayStation Portable, where he has a more youthful appearance than in his Final Fantasy incarnation. He is featured prominently in the Olympus Coliseum (which is where Cloud often appeared in previous installments), where he participates in tournaments to achieve his dream of becoming a hero. As Birth by Sleep is a prequel to the other Kingdom Hearts titles, the staff chose Zack as they wanted a character from a Final Fantasy prequel.

An alternate timeline version of Zack is introduced in Final Fantasy VII Remake, where he survives the ambush by Shinra forces and continues dragging Cloud toward Midgar. This version of Zack returns in Final Fantasy VII Rebirth, in which he helps Aerith's adoptive mother Elmyra look over a comatose Cloud and Aerith as the end of the world approaches. After learning of Aerith's fate from Marlene, Zack's timeline briefly merges with the main one and he teams up with Cloud to battle Sephiroth before being brought back to his timeline.

== Critical reception ==
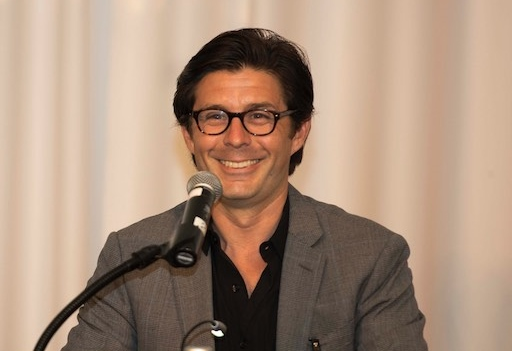
Rick Gomez's performance as Zack received positive response by the media.

Zack has been described as one of the best and popular video game characters of the series. IGN UK's Dave McCarthy noted how Zack's role in the Compilation of Final Fantasy VII evolved as the series developed, to the point of him getting his own game. James Stephanie Sterling of GamesRadar+ found Zack to be one of video game's most sexually appealing male characters due to his personality and look.

Zack's role in Crisis Core has received mixed reactions. IGN's Ryan Clements particularly praised Zack's relationships with the other main characters. 1UP.com's Jeremy Parish agreed with Clements, arguing that Zack's story contrasted with other RPG plots, calling it "the heart of the game". GameSpy's Gerald Villoria described Zack as "King of the Nice Guys", noting that even though he can be a "pretty hate-worthy character if you're the jaded type who mocks the typical Final Fantasy storyline", players who dislike him could come to appreciate him. Zack was also called an "endearing main character" by GameRevolution who stated that despite what the character goes through during the game, he still retains his friendly attitude. Like other reviewers, RPGamer viewed him to have the "full, soulful carriage of a Final Fantasy hero" due to his personal conflicts, despite his "artfully teased hair and devil-may-care grin". Although Eurogamer's Simon Parkin found Zack's physical appearance to be highly similar to Cloud's, he added that "this fan service doesn't put a foot wrong until he reaches into his [Zack's] pocket, pulls out a mobile phone and speaks". On the other hand, PSXextreme's Ben Dutka, felt that Zack was not worthy of his own game, believing that only players with "halfway decent memories" and a "hardcore completionist mentality" will be able to remember Zack's appearances in the original Final Fantasy VII. IGN UK expressed a mixed opinion about the character, feeling his personality was sometimes annoying, although it served to contrast with the serious attitudes of the other main characters. Similarly, VideoGamer.com's Wesley Yin-Poole called Zack Cloud's "identical twin in all but hair colour" and complained about his personality being "annoying" during the first half of the game. Destructoid agreed, telling players not to expect to enjoy Zack if they do not like "cocky teenagers" and even labelling him an "annoying cockhole".

Besides his personality, Zack received commentary for his relationship with Angeal and Cloud. ScreenRant also praised the narrative of the Buster Sword in Crisis Core as it represents Angeal's and Zack's honors, with the latter passing it to Cloud in a John Woo-like movie. In "Why Is The Buster Sword Special In Final Fantasy 7?", TheGamer praised the narrative Square Enix gave its weapon, as Cloud inherited it from Angeal and Zack in their deaths and continues using it across Final Fantasy VII to save the planet from Sephiroth. Because the Buster Sword is important to Cloud's character, the player cannot get rid of such an initial weapon. In "Crisis Core: Final Fantasy 7 Reunion- The History of the Buster Sword", GameRant said that the weapon originates from Angeal's family as a treasure he always keeps, eventually passing it to Zack in his death whereas Zack passes it to Cloud. When it came to Cloud's taking the Buster Sword to Aerith's church in the final scene from Advent Children, multiple writers considered it symbolism of Zack and Aerith reuniting in the afterlife. Because Zack survives to the events of Crisis Core in the events of Remake, Meristation looks forward to his role in Rebirth and his link with Cloud.

There was also commentary about Zack's actors. Eurogamer praised Zack's English voice actor for doing a good job, noting "his character's maturing and developing over the 15-hour storyline". IGN AU's Patrick Kolan agreed, calling Rick Gomez's work "pretty likeable". Gameplanet criticized Rick Gomez's acting, finding it more immature than they expected. Caleb Pierce's work as the character in Reunion resulted in several complaints from reviewers due to lacking Gomez's appeal, making the character come across as untolerable due to lacking heroic and energetic tone from Gomez. The criticism from fans in regards to the new cast led to mods.

== See also ==
- List of Final Fantasy VII characters
