= Crisis Core: Final Fantasy VII =

2007 video game

- European PSP cover art
- Developers: Square Enix; Tose (Reunion)
- Publisher: Square Enix
- Directors: Hajime Tabata; Reunion; Tetsuya Nomura; Takeshi Asano
- Producers: Hideki Imaizumi; Tetsuya Nomura; Mariko Sato (Reunion)
- Designer: Yuto Doi (Reunion)
- Programmers: Shun Moriya; Haruyuki Yamaguchi (Reunion)
- Artists: Yoshihiro Hirota; Yusuke Naora; Tetsuya Nomura; Takashi Yokota (Reunion)
- Writers: Kazushige Nojima; Sachie Hirano
- Composer: Takeharu Ishimoto
- Series: Compilation of Final Fantasy VII; Final Fantasy
- Engine: Unreal Engine 4 (Reunion)
- Platforms: PlayStation Portable; Reunion; Nintendo Switch; PlayStation 4; PlayStation 5; Windows; Xbox One; Xbox Series X/S; Nintendo Switch 2
- Release: PlayStation Portable: JP: September 13, 2007; NA: March 25, 2008; AU: June 19, 2008; EU: June 20, 2008; Reunion: WW: December 13, 2022; Nintendo Switch 2: WW: September 9, 2026
- Genre: Action role-playing
- Mode: Single-player

Crisis Core: Final Fantasy VII (Note: Japanese: クライシス コア -ファイナルファンタジーVII-, Hepburn: Kuraishisu Koa -Fainaru Fantajī Sebun-) is a 2007 action role-playing game developed and published by Square Enix for the PlayStation Portable. The game serves as a prequel to the 1997 title Final Fantasy VII and is part of the metaseries Compilation of Final Fantasy VII, which includes other products related to the original game.

The game primarily focuses on Zack Fair, a young member of the special forces organization SOLDIER, who is assigned to look for the missing SOLDIER Genesis Rhapsodos. As he searches for Genesis, Zack discovers Genesis' origin, Project G, and its connection to the high-ranking SOLDIERs, Sephiroth and Angeal Hewley. The game's storyline spans the war between the megacorporation Shinra and the people of Wutai to the events in Nibelheim, ending just before the beginning of Final Fantasy VII.

The game was directed by Hajime Tabata, with Tetsuya Nomura serving as creative producer and character designer. Before development, the Square Enix staff initially planned to make a PlayStation Portable port of the mobile phone game Before Crisis: Final Fantasy VII, but after discussion, they decided to create a new game instead. The plot is based on a scenario Kazushige Nojima had in mind when working on Final Fantasy VII.

Crisis Core enjoyed strong sales, selling over two million units worldwide. Critical reception was generally positive, with praise for its story but mixed responses on its combat system. A remaster of the game, Crisis Core: Final Fantasy VII Reunion, was released on December 13, 2022 as part of the remake series for all major consoles, and September 9, 2026 on Nintendo Switch 2. Its storyline was recreated in the mobile game Final Fantasy VII: Ever Crisis.

== Gameplay ==
Crisis Core is an action role-playing game in which the player controls Zack Fair through and between open areas, allowing him to talk with non-player characters, interact with the environment, and engage monsters in battle. At save points, the player may opt to take one of the available side missions, and if so, Zack is moved to a special area to complete the mission, which usually involves defeating one or more monsters. If the mission is successfully completed, the player is rewarded with beneficial items, and often new missions become available. Whether the player is successful in the side mission or not, Zack is returned to the save point in the main game upon completion.

Zack in battle

Crisis Core uses a real-time combat system in which the player can move Zack around, initiate attacks, special abilities and spells, use items, and block or dodge attacks. Zack's abilities in battle are set by his currently equipped materia. Up to six Materia can be equipped at any one time, which can impart special attacks, magic spells, or passive bonuses, such as health increases or the ability to display the statistics of the current foe in combat. Materia is gained through exploration, as rewards from side missions, as spoils of battle, or from shops. Materia can be fused together to make more powerful versions with improved bonuses; for example, fusing an attack Materia with an elemental magic Materia can create a new attack skill Materia that inflicts elemental magic damage in addition to physical damage. Special items collected in the game can also be used in Materia fusion to further increase the Materia's power.

Crisis Core uses a slot machine-like mechanic to affect the combat system. The "Digital Mind Wave" (DMW) features two sets of three spinning wheels; one set with numbers one through seven, and another with pictures of characters that Zack befriends during the game. The DMW automatically spins as long as Zack has at least 10 "Soldier Points", which are awarded to the player by defeating foes. If the DMW stops with the same three pictures lined up, Zack will then perform an appropriate Limit Break attack that can greatly harm an enemy or significantly heal Zack. Additionally, in this case, if the number slots give two or more of the same number, the Materia in that slot will power up. Should the numbers line up as "777", Zack will gain an experience level, increasing his health, soldier points, and ability points. As a result, leveling up is no longer determined by experience points and is instead based on luck. If there is no match in the pictures, matching numbers on the slots will grant temporary bonuses, such as limited invincibility or zero-cost use of skills and abilities. The chance of matching pictures is tied to the current Limit level, which is raised by taking damage in battle and reduced upon successful battles, and after certain storyline events. After collecting certain items in the game, the pictures on the DMW may also randomly change to summonable creatures, which have more destructive and beneficial Limit Breaks should the pictures match up.

Following completion of the game, the player will obtain a New Game Plus option. The North American and European releases of Crisis Core also have an added difficulty mode, which increases the power and health of enemies.

== Plot ==
=== Characters ===
Left to right, Genesis, Angeal, Zack, Sephiroth, Tseng, and Cloud

Crisis Core begins seven years before the events of Final Fantasy VII, and many characters from that game and related works appear. However, the primary characters in the game are from either SOLDIER, which consists of Mako-enhanced superhuman soldiers, or from their covert branch of operatives, the Turks.

The main protagonist is Zack Fair, a young and friendly SOLDIER. His mentor and friend is Angeal Hewley, a 1st class SOLDIER who is also friends with fellow SOLDIER members Sephiroth and Genesis Rhapsodos, who ultimately becomes the game's primary antagonist. The SOLDIER operatives work under Director Lazard, the illegitimate son of President Shinra. Zack is also friends with the Turks, particularly their leader Tseng and one of their female operatives, Cissnei. Over the course of the game, Zack encounters and befriends Aerith Gainsborough, a young woman tending flowers from a ruined church in the Midgar slums, and Cloud Strife, a Shinra infantryman.

=== Story ===
SOLDIER's Zack Fair and his mentor Angeal Hewley are dispatched to Wutai to support the Shinra war effort, but during the fighting, Angeal disappears. Zack is appointed to find both him and another missing SOLDIER, Genesis Rhapsodos. Zack, accompanied by Tseng, learns that Genesis and Angeal deserted Shinra, and he and Sephiroth are assigned to kill them. With help from Dr. Hollander, a scientist with a vendetta against Shinra, Genesis creates an army of clones to attack Shinra headquarters. After the forces are defeated, Zack and Sephiroth track down Hollander's secret laboratory, where they learn Hollander used both Genesis and Angeal as part of "Project G," an attempt to create supersoldiers infused with the extraterrestrial lifeform Jenova's cells. Sephiroth faces off against Genesis while Zack pursues Hollander. Angeal, intent on keeping Hollander alive so he can be returned to normal, prevents Zack from killing the doctor and knocks him into the slums of Midgar.

Zack recovers as he finds Aerith tending to him. After spending some time together, Zack returns to SOLDIER headquarters, which is now under attack by Genesis. Zack re-allies with Angeal, who has developed doubts about his and Genesis' actions. As Angeal, Zack, and Sephiroth protect the headquarters, Angeal confronts Genesis before both disappear. Zack is subsequently ordered to investigate Modeoheim, where Genesis has been spotted. While en route to Modeoheim, Zack meets Shinra infantryman Cloud, and they become friends. Near Modeoheim, Zack encounters and defeats Genesis, who seemingly commits suicide by throwing himself into the depths of a reactor. Zack travels on to Modeoheim, where he finds Angeal and Hollander. Tired of the fighting and succumbing to his gradual degradation, Angeal summons and fuses with his own clones and mutates into a monster, forcing Zack to kill him. Before dying, Angeal gives Zack his Buster Sword, telling him to protect his honor.

While Shinra continues the pursuit of Hollander, Genesis re-emerges, producing clones; some of them appear in Midgar, forcing Zack to return to protect Aerith. Leaving her with an Angeal clone to protect her, Zack travels with Sephiroth and Cloud to investigate a Mako reactor near Nibelheim. Upon confronting Genesis at the reactor, Sephiroth learns that he is also an experiment, as he was implanted with Jenova's cells before his birth. Genesis explains that his body is degrading and he needs Sephiroth's cells to survive, but Sephiroth refuses. Overcome with the recent revelations regarding his past, Sephiroth locks himself in Nibelheim Mansion. He sets Nibelheim ablaze a week later, going to the Mako reactor to take Jenova's body and wrongfully believing her to be his mother. When Zack fails to stop him, Cloud throws Sephiroth into the Lifestream below the reactor. Zack awakens to find that Shinra covered up the Nibelheim incident and that both he and Cloud have become part of Professor Hojo's experiments on Jenova cells and Mako exposure. Zack is able to escape and takes a catatonic Cloud with him, but they immediately become high-priority targets for Shinra. While fleeing, Zack learns that Genesis and Hollander are still trying to stabilize Genesis' mutation, and plan to use Cloud's cells since he is the only one with Sephiroth's genes.

Hollander tries to get to Cloud, but Zack kills him. Zack then finds Director Lazard who, now mutated into a humanoid Angeal clone, has turned against Shinra. Lazard directs Zack to the remains of Banora to find Genesis, where he defeats Genesis. Upon returning, he discovers Shinra has located them and killed Lazard. The Angeal clone left guarding Aerith arrives but is also killed. Zack discovers a note he had carried from Aerith and learns he and Cloud were subjected to Hojo's experiments for four years. As Cloud begins dying of Mako poisoning, he and Zack are hunted by the Turks as he carries Cloud towards Midgar. Genesis' body is collected by two soldiers: Nero the Sable and Weiss the Immaculate of Deepground.

Shinra pursues Zack and Cloud, catching up with them just outside Midgar as Tseng and the Turks attempt to rescue Zack against Shinra's wishes. Leaving the still semi-conscious Cloud hidden away, Zack fights off an enormous number of Shinra troops but is fatally wounded. Cloud awakens and finds Zack's body after Shinra leaves; as he is dying, Zack bequeaths the Buster Sword to Cloud, as Angeal had done to him. Zack is welcomed into the Lifestream by Angeal and wonders if he has become a hero. The epilogue recreates the opening scenes of Final Fantasy VII, as Cloud arrives in Midgar and claims to be a former SOLDIER.

== Development ==
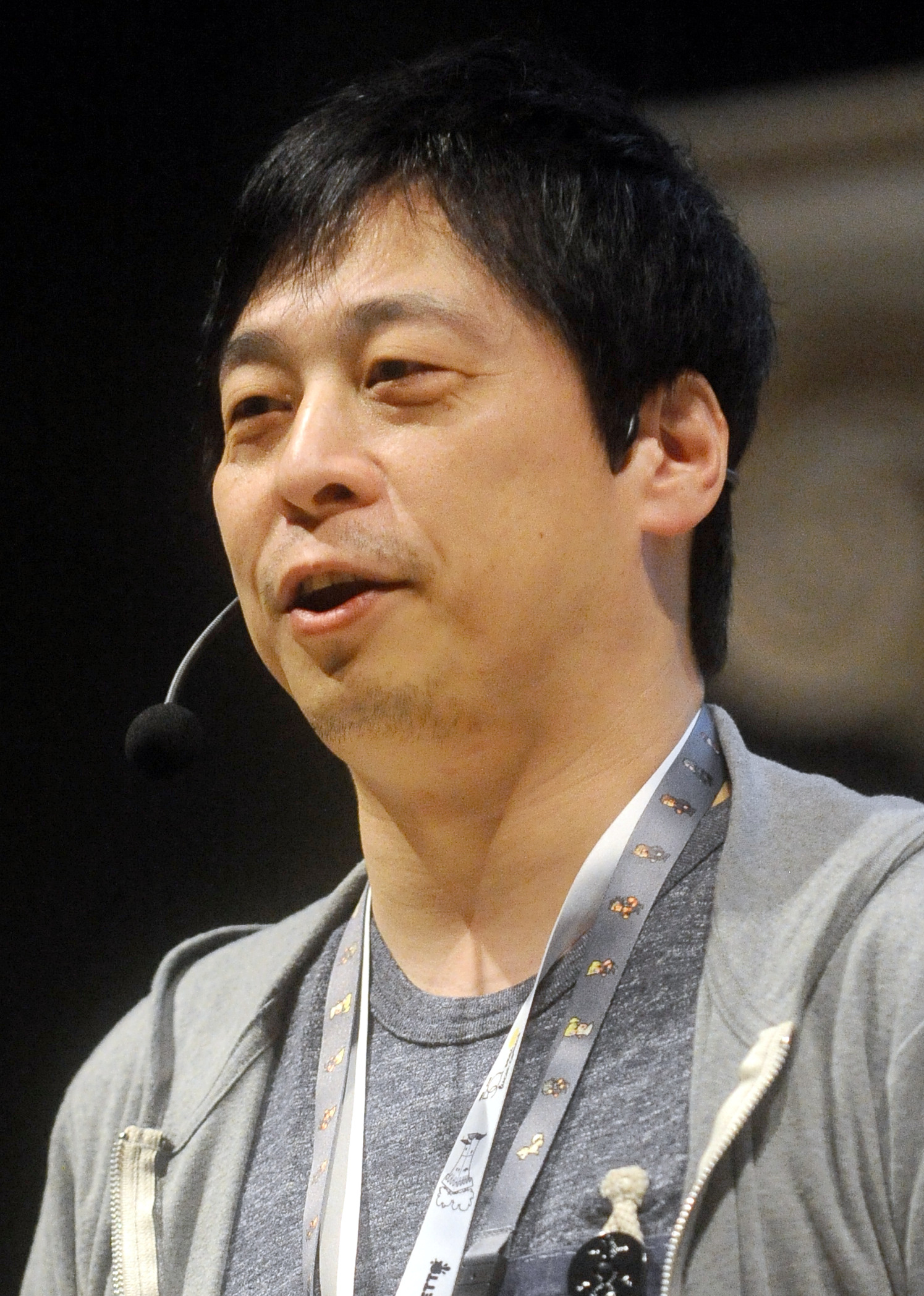
Hajime Tabata was chosen to be director and consulted with Tetsuya Nomura and Yoshinori Kitase on the title to create.

The idea of Crisis Core originated when Hajime Tabata was chosen as director for an upcoming Final Fantasy title for the PlayStation Portable. After discussing with Tetsuya Nomura and Yoshinori Kitase, Tabata decided that the game should be another installment in the Compilation of Final Fantasy VII, feeling that the pressure of producing a game from a popular series would motivate both the staff and himself. The original idea was to make a PlayStation Portable port of Before Crisis: Final Fantasy VII, as it had been released for mobile phones and the staff wanted to expand it, but after deciding Zack was going to be the protagonist of the new game, the idea of a Before Crisis port was canceled.

Kitase wanted to make sure the game exceeded fans' expectations, so he made sure that rather than making it a "tribute" to Final Fantasy VII, it shared important links with other titles from Compilation of Final Fantasy VII. Similarly, Tabata explained that he and the staff were very wary throughout the production of altering the fans' perception of Final Fantasy VII's characters. For example, one of the main background events from Final Fantasy VII, Nibelheim's destruction, had been changed somewhat in the OVA Last Order: Final Fantasy VII, and due to negative fan reaction to these changes, the game staff decided not to make any major changes in Crisis Core. However, they also operated on the principle that this game dealt with those characters' "younger days", so that new elements could be added without changing the characters too much.

One of the primary reasons Zack was chosen as the protagonist was because his fate was predetermined. Kitase said that Zack's story had "been cooking for 10 years" as, despite being a minor character in Final Fantasy VII, Nomura had already developed conceptual artwork, and Kazushige Nojima had already worked out a story. The game was originally meant to have more scenes depicting Zack and Cloud's flight to Midgar, so as to expand on their friendship and unrealized plans, but these scenes were removed due to UMD limitations, and so the staff focused more on Zack's background as a formidable warrior. The addition of the character of Genesis to the story came about after discussions between producer Hideki Imaizumi and the character's Japanese voice actor, Gackt, as Imaizumi had been impressed with the characters' brief appearance in the secret ending to Dirge of Cerberus: Final Fantasy VII, and felt there was great room to expand the character. Sephiroth's role was specifically written to give him a more human side. The game's logo represents various main characters; the blue sky symbolizes Zack; the white feather symbolizes Angeal; and the water symbolizes Aerith.

Crisis Core was first envisioned as an action game, but because almost all of the staff had more experience designing role-playing games (RPGs), they decided to make battles more similar to the ones found in standard RPGs. However, they also added more action-orientated elements to the battles, resulting in the game becoming more of an action RPG than a traditional RPG. The Materia system was designed so that players could choose between "RPG-oriented enhancements" and "action-oriented enhancements", as well as to help with the game's balance. Additionally, the Digital Mind Wave system (DMW) was added to give gameplay an element of luck, as well as to prevent combat feeling repetitive. Nomura and Kitase wanted to include this in the game because of their enthusiasm for pachinko machines.

The game was first announced at E3 2005, with its first trailer consisting of clips from Last Order. In an interview for Famitsu, Nomura said that a playable demo of the game would be ready by the end of 2006, but there was no mention of whether the demo would be openly available to PSP owners. By May 2005, Nomura designed the concept art for the game, with the gameplay set to be "interesting" and "previously unseen". In May 2007, both Nomura and Tabata revealed that the game was 90% complete, and that completing its story mode and all side quests would take about 100 hours of gameplay. A playable demo was made available at Jump Festa '06.

== Soundtrack ==
The game's soundtrack was released on October 10, 2007, containing fifty-five songs on two discs. The music was composed by Takeharu Ishimoto, with a few tracks orchestrated by Kazuhiko Toyama. The soundtrack also included remixes of various music from Final Fantasy VII composed by Nobuo Uematsu and Last Order: Final Fantasy VII, which was also composed by Ishimoto. The game's ending theme, "Why", was performed by Ayaka. The addition of "Why" was revealed by Square Enix in May 2007, with Ayaka stating that she was fascinated by Crisis Core's story and felt she "would like to deliver "Why" alongside Zack's fate to the hearts of many people". The single "Why" was released in Japan on September 5 the same year.

== Release ==
On September 13, 2007, Square Enix released a special edition bundle for Crisis Core; a special silver-colored PlayStation Portable Slim and Lite with Final Fantasy VII's 10th Anniversary insignia on the back and on one side. As with many limited edition Final Fantasy VII-related releases by Square Enix, the bundle was limited to 77,777 units.

Crisis Core was released in North America on March 25, 2008. Pre-orders from certain retailers, such as GameStop, came with a Shinra UMD case, depending on how long supplies lasted; pre-orders from Best Buy came with a metallic foil cover. A limited edition, which was only available online by pre-order, was released in Europe and included special slipcase packaging and a promotional artwork book entitled The Art of Crisis Core: Final Fantasy VII. In Europe, a bundle containing the game and the limited edition Crisis Core-engraved silver PlayStation Portable was released on June 20. As with several games from the company, Square released an Ultimania guidebook in Japan on October 18, 2007.

After Crisis Core's release, Kitase expressed surprise at the quality of the cutscenes, to the point where he felt it could almost be a PlayStation 2 game. He also enjoyed the game's ending, surprised by how moving Zack's story became.

== Reception ==
=== Critical response ===
Reception

Aggregate score
Aggregator	Score
Metacritic	83/100

Review scores
Publication	Score
1Up.com	B+
Computer and Video Games	9/10
Eurogamer	7/10
Famitsu	35/40
GamePro	4.5/5
GameSpot	9/10
GameSpy	4/5
GamesRadar+	9/10
GameTrailers	8.4/10
IGN	8.5/10
PALGN	8.5/10
VideoGamer.com	9/10
X-Play	2/5

Crisis Core has received generally favorable reviews according to review aggregator website Metacritic. GameSpot awarded it an "Editor's Choice" label, praising its storyline, combat system, and its presentation. VideoGamer.com found its fighting system "addictive". Similarly, GamePro gave it a positive review, calling it the "best looking [PlayStation Portable] title" and praising how it incorporated elements from the Compilation while introducing new aspects.

The game's fight system was generally praised. Criticism was directed towards the DMW system, with GamesRadar's AJ Glasser recommended players to try the Hard Mode as a result of how overpowered the system is, while PALGN found it as the game's weakest point. Meanwhile, Eurogamer criticized how winning battles often depends on luck rather than skills. Computer and Video Games stated that the combat system "never becomes tiresome". X-Play criticized the unskippable cutscenes and considered the dialogue "poor" and the gameplay "repetitive". On April Fools' Day, in response to criticism for their original review, they "decided to give the game a second look and give it a re-review, this time with a clear unbiased perspective", sarcastically dubbing over the original and giving it an impossibly high 6/5.

1UP.com called it one of the best prequels of all time, arguing that the narrative "does a better job of putting players in FFVII's world than even the original game did". Computer and Video Games mentioned that despite the game's main story only lasting 12 hours, the side-quests helped expand the game's length. Despite initial mixed reactions to Zack, the protagonist was found likable due to his bonds with other characters. It also received a place in the "Editor's Choice" gallery of recommended games for the PSP platform. The characterization of the villain Sephiroth was also praised for giving him more humanity in the prequel before his eventual fall into madness. Eurogamer criticized that "for the twenty-six, twenty-eight, thirty-year-olds who it's aimed at, the game has little to offer beyond polished sentimentality". The presentation was also praised, highlighting the CGI, character designs, and backgrounds for making the game stand out from other PSP games. Takeharu Ishimoto's remixes of the original Final Fantasy VII background themes were also praised. Rick Gomez's work as Zack was also the subject of positive response.

=== Sales ===
Crisis Core sold 350,000 copies in Japan on its release date, including the 77,777 Limited Edition PSP/Crisis Core bundles. Crisis Core was the best-selling game across all regions from April through September 2007, with 710,000 copies sold in Japan. Selling 790,705 units as of August 2008, it became the third best-selling game for the PSP in Japan. In March 2008, Crisis Core sold 301,600 copies in its first month of release in the United States, behind the sales of God of War: Chains of Olympus, which sold 340,500 copies, making Crisis Core the second best-selling game for the PSP during the month of March and the sixth best-selling game overall. As of March 2009, Crisis Core had sold 2.1 million units worldwide, with 830,000 of those sales coming from Japan. About 840,000 units of the game, including 550,000 in Europe, were sold during Square Enix's 2009 fiscal year. In response to the game's sales, Square Enix labeled Crisis Core their best PSP game of the year, calling it "an incredible success". Doug Bone, Square Enix's UK sales director, called it "the must-have PSP game of 2008".

=== Accolades ===
Crisis Core has also received a number of awards from different publications. It was nominated by GameSpot for the "Best of 2008" awards, in the "Best Story", "Best RPG Game" and "Best PSP Game" categories, winning "Best PSP Game". It was also listed as the tenth best PSP game of all time by IGN. Four IGN articles concerning the game were in "The Top 10 PSP Stories of 2008", with the review article listed at number one. In IGN's Best of 2008, Crisis Core won in the categories "Best RPG for the PSP" and "Best Story for the PSP", and was nominated as "Best Overall RPG". Videogamer.com placed it fifteenth and fourth in their articles "Best Games of 2008" and "Top 10 PlayStation exclusives of 2008", respectively. GamePro featured it as one of the five games PSP gamers should play, one of the 31 best PSP titles in 2009, and as the seventh best video game prequel. It was also voted to third place in the Dengeki poll of most tear-inducing games of all time. In 2011, it was voted second place in the Famitsu readers' poll on the same topic.

== Crisis Core: Final Fantasy VII Reunion ==
=== Background and development ===
A comparison between the original Crisis Core (above) and the remaster Reunion (below)

In 2022, to celebrate the 25th anniversary of the original Final Fantasy VII, a remaster, entitled Crisis Core: Final Fantasy VII Reunion, was released for Nintendo Switch, PlayStation 4, PlayStation 5, Windows, Xbox One, and Xbox Series X/S. Co-developed with Tose, who previously collaborated with Square Enix on World of Final Fantasy (2016), the graphics have been converted to HD, including new 3D models for all elements, using Unreal Engine 4. The game also includes a newly arranged soundtrack and full voice acting for all dialogue. Originally, there were no plans for a big update in graphics until the team decided to make it look similar to Remake. While the story remains the same from the original version, Reunion is part of the larger Final Fantasy VII Remake project, being considered a prequel to the three-part remake series. Reunion also features an updated combat system that is a combination of the original battle system and "something close" to the one featured in Final Fantasy VII Remake. While Square expanded new elements from the story of Remake, Reunion was made to come across as faithful as possible to the original game. Camerawork and motions have also been adjusted and all of the summons cutscenes have been completely remade. A hard mode, which was only available in Western releases of the original game, was added to the Japanese version.

Many characters are voiced by their English-dubbed voice actors from Final Fantasy VII Remake, as well as the original Japanese cast, including Zack Fair (Caleb Pierce / Kenichi Suzumura), Sephiroth (Tyler Hoechlin / Toshiyuki Morikawa), Aerith Gainsborough (Briana White / Maaya Sakamoto), Cloud Strife (Cody Christian / Takahiro Sakurai), Tseng (Vic Chao / Junichi Suwabe), and Tifa Lockhart (Britt Baron / Ayumi Ito), with additional characters and voice actors including Angeal Hewley (Bill Millsap / Kazuhiko Inoue), Genesis (Shaun Conde / Gackt), Cissnei (Kayli Mills / Asumi Nakada), Lazard (Francis Ausley / Junpei Morita), Hollander (Jason Marnocha / Shinya Owada), and Yuffie Kisaragi (Brandilyn Cheah / Yumi Kakazu). Reunion was released on December 13, 2022.

Crisis Core is regarded by executive producer Yoshinori Kitase as a bridge to play between Final Fantasy VII Remake and Rebirth. However, since the original Crisis Core was released only for the PlayStation Portable, the game was remastered into Reunion in order to make it accessible. Creative director Tetsuya Nomura wanted Crisis Core to be seen as its own story when compared with other games from the recently released Remake. Plans for developing Reunion started during the making of Remake. One of the biggest reasons was to expand on the character of Zack, who would become more prominent in the narrative. Though new actors were utilized for the English version, the story was not altered. Since Remake altered parts from Crisis Core, Kitase aims players to explore more connections between the story.

In the making of Reunion, several improvements to the original Crisis Core were implemented. Producer Mariko Sato stated that the gameplay was altered to avoid interruptions in the middle of the combat while retaining the base elements of the Digital Mind Wave system. A "skip" function has also been added. Other improvements have also been made to the "hit stop" mechanic as well as adjusting the magic speed for the improvement. Sato says that it was difficult but they believe that players would be pleased with the final product as the game was released to several consoles instead of the original which was PlayStation Portable exclusive.

=== Critical reception ===
Reception

Aggregate scores
Aggregator	Score
Metacritic	NS: 77/100; PC: 83/100; PS5: 78/100; XSXS: 83/100
OpenCritic	77% recommend (Note: Based on 128 reviews)

Review scores
Publication	Score
Digital Trends	3/5
Eurogamer	Recommended
Game Informer	7.5/10
GameSpot	8/10
GamesRadar+	3/5
IGN	8/10
PC Gamer (US)	86/100
PCMag	4/5
Push Square	7/10
Shacknews	9/10
VG247	4/5

On Metacritic, all ports received similar positive response by video game critics.

Critics were divided in regards to the narrative, with Eurogamer seeing Zack's character arc as unnecessary fan service that did not expand on anything from the original Final Fantasy VII with an overdramatic tone. On the other hand, GameSpot and IGN felt the remaster made Crisis Core more memorable, due to its improved adaptation and felt Zack and Sephiroth are more likable than former SOLDIERs Angeal and Genesis, thanks to their more human portrayals, most notably Tyler Hoechlin's work as Sephiroth. GamesRadar was more critical of Zack's initial portrayal as "stupid hero", only to come to like him in his final moment, finding Sephiroth instead as a more memorable character, with Tifa's and Aerith's characters being demoted to cameos when compared to Final Fantasy VII or Remake. The graphics were praised for being superior to the original game but still not as comparable to newly released titles.

Critics felt the gameplay was improved in the remaster comparable to previous entries, but still not as much as Remake, with GamesRadar finding it "fantastic", while VG247 found it highly superior to Crisis Core, thanks to the advantages of the ports. GameSpot did not find several differences between Reunion and its original PSP game, but still found the gameplay appealing, most notably the DMW system being complimented as improved. Digital Trends also found the DMW enjoyable, but found the overall fight system repetitive and the side missions "dull". The use of summoning creatures were noted to be impressive due to the improved visuals. IGN also panned the handling of sidequest, and noted the DMW system comes across as divisive for how much it can alter a player's reaction to the combat.

==== Sales ====
The game sold over 150,000 units upon being released in Japan. In the United Kingdom, it debuted at eighth place in the boxed charts. The next week, it was 30th place in the UK boxed charts.

==== Accolades ====
At the New York Game Awards, Reunion received a nomination in the category "Freedom Tower Award for Best Remake", losing to The Stanley Parable: Ultra Deluxe. At the 2023 Japan Game Awards, the game was one of eleven recipients of an "Award for Excellence".
