= Final Fantasy VII Remake =

2020 video game

- Cover art, featuring the game's protagonist, Cloud Strife
- Developer: Square Enix Business Division 1
- Publisher: Square Enix
- Directors: Tetsuya Nomura; Naoki Hamaguchi; Motomu Toriyama
- Producer: Yoshinori Kitase
- Designers: Naoki Hamaguchi; Teruki Endo
- Programmers: Naoki Hamaguchi; Daiki Hoshina; Satoru Koyama
- Artists: Shintaro Takai; Roberto Ferrari
- Writers: Kazushige Nojima; Motomu Toriyama
- Composers: Masashi Hamauzu; Mitsuto Suzuki (Note: Original Final Fantasy VII music and the main theme "Hollow" were composed by Nobuo Uematsu.)
- Series: Final Fantasy
- Engine: Unreal Engine 4
- Platforms: PlayStation 4; Intergrade; PlayStation 5; Windows; Nintendo Switch 2; Xbox Series X/S
- Release: PlayStation 4; April 10, 2020; Intergrade; PlayStation 5; June 10, 2021; Windows; December 16, 2021; Nintendo Switch 2, Xbox Series X/S; January 22, 2026
- Genre: Action role-playing
- Mode: Single-player

Final Fantasy VII Remake (Note: Japanese: ファイナルファンタジーVII リメイク, Hepburn: Fainaru Fantajī Sebun Rimeiku) is a 2020 action role-playing game developed and published by Square Enix for the PlayStation 4. It is the first in a trilogy of games remaking Final Fantasy VII (1997), originally released for the PlayStation. An enhanced version, Final Fantasy VII Remake Intergrade, (Note: Japanese: ファイナルファンタジーVII リメイク インターグレード, Hepburn: Fainaru Fantajī Sebun Rimeiku Intāgurēdo) was released for PlayStation 5 and Windows in 2021, followed by ports for the Nintendo Switch 2 and Xbox Series X/S in 2026.

Set in the dystopian cyberpunk metropolis of Midgar, players control the mercenary Cloud Strife. He joins AVALANCHE, an eco-terrorist group trying to stop the megacorporation Shinra from using the planet's life essence as an energy source. Although serving as a general adaptation of the first portion of the original game, Remake contains several plot changes and divergences from the original story. The gameplay combines real-time action with role-playing elements, an overhaul from the original turn-based combat.

Final Fantasy VII Remake was announced in 2015 following years of speculation. Several key staff members from the original game returned, including Tetsuya Nomura as the director, Yoshinori Kitase as the producer, Kazushige Nojima as the writer, Motomu Toriyama as a co-director, and the composer Nobuo Uematsu. The staff redesigned the characters to balance realism and stylization.

Final Fantasy VII Remake received positive reviews, with praise for its graphics, gameplay, narrative, and music. Critics praised the expanded story and the updated battle system for its strategic elements and visual flourishes, but the linearity and repetitive side-quests received criticism. It was one of the fastest-selling PlayStation 4 games, selling more than 3.5 million copies in three days and more than 8.7 million by March 2025. The second game in the remake trilogy, Final Fantasy VII Rebirth, was released in 2024. The third, Final Fantasy VII Revelation, is scheduled for 2027.

== Gameplay ==
While role-playing elements are still present in the gameplay similar to the original game, Remake uses fast-paced, real-time combat, as seen in this fight against two soldiers.

Final Fantasy VII Remake is the first in a planned series of games remaking the 1997 PlayStation game Final Fantasy VII. It covers the first section of the original game, set in the metropolis Midgar.

Players control Cloud Strife, a former Shinra soldier turned mercenary who joins the eco-terrorist group AVALANCHE to fight the Shinra Corporation, who have been draining the planet's life energy. Every element has been remade, using real-time polygonal graphics as opposed to the pre-rendered environments of the original. The story includes major expansions to character development and some notable plot additions.

Exploration and battle mechanics both take place in real-time, like Final Fantasy XV. The game features an altered Active Time Battle (ATB) system from the original, which gradually fills up slowly, or can fill faster with attacks. Once it is filled, the player can halt the action and use special abilities such as magic, items, and special moves. The player can assign these special abilities to shortcut buttons, allowing them to play in real-time without pausing. Each special ability uses up a segment of the ATB bar. The player can switch between party members at any time during battle. Each party member has their own individual skills, such as Cloud's close-quarters melee attacks and Barret's long-range distance attacks. Players are able to use magic and summons of large creatures, and a Limit Break gauge allows characters to perform more powerful attacks once charged. While the game has more real-time elements, strategic elements still remain, such as selecting weapons and magic for each character to wield.

== Plot ==
Cloud Strife (Cody Christian / Takahiro Sakurai) (Note: Major Dodson and Yukihiro Aizawa voiced Cloud at 14 years old in English and Japanese, respectively.) is a former member of SOLDIER, the elite warriors of the megacorporation Shinra Electric Power Company, which rules over much of the Planet from the metropolis of Midgar. Shinra uses Mako, a refined form of the Planet's spiritual energy harvested by massive reactors, to power Midgar and develop cutting-edge technology. Disillusioned with Shinra, and at the request of his childhood friend Tifa Lockhart (Britt Baron / Ayumi Ito), (Note: Glory Curda and Ayaka Mitsumoto voiced Tifa at 8 through 13 years old in English and Japanese, respectively.) Cloud takes a mercenary job for a splinter cell of AVALANCHE, an ecological resistance organization, led by Barret Wallace (John Eric Bentley / Masahiro Kobayashi). Barret believes excessive Mako harvesting harms the Planet, and leads a bombing attack on Mako Reactor 1. Cloud is continuously haunted by memories of Sephiroth (Tyler Hoechlin / Toshiyuki Morikawa), an enigmatic former SOLDIER who is believed to be dead, and meets florist Aerith Gainsborough (Briana White / Maaya Sakamoto) (Note: Capri Oliver and Chihiro Tanaka voiced Aerith at 7 years old in English and Japanese, respectively.) in the aftermath of the bombing. Strange ghost-like entities, who alternately help and hinder Cloud, lead him to be recruited for another attack on Mako Reactor 5. After being separated from the rest of the group during the attack, Cloud meets Aerith again and protects her from Shinra forces. After reuniting with Tifa, the trio learns that Shinra plans to collapse a piece of Midgar's "plate" onto the Sector 7 slums in a false flag attack in a bid to destroy AVALANCHE. AVALANCHE fails to stop Shinra's plan, and the plate falls, destroying much of Sector 7. Aerith helps much of the Sector's population, including Barret's daughter Marlene, evacuate in time, but she is captured by Shinra.

Cloud, Tifa, and Barret infiltrate Shinra headquarters and rescue Aerith from being used as an experiment by Shinra lead scientist Hojo (James Sie / Shigeru Chiba). Aerith reveals that she is the last descendant of the Cetra, a near-extinct precursor race who resided in a "Promised Land," which Shinra covets for its boundless Mako reserves. The group meets a talking canine-like creature called Red XIII (Max Mittelman / Kappei Yamaguchi), who explains that the ghostly entities are called Whispers. They exist to ensure that the course of destiny is not altered by correcting any deviations from this course. Meanwhile, Sephiroth infiltrates Shinra and steals a mysterious entity known as "Jenova," connected to the extinction of the Cetra.

In a confrontation at the top of Shinra headquarters, Sephiroth kills the president of Shinra. Shinra's son Rufus (Josh Bowman / Tōru Ōkawa) arrives to assume control of the company and fights Cloud, but is defeated. Cloud and his allies flee the scene via the Midgar Expressway, but find Sephiroth waiting for them at the end. After defeating Whisper Harbinger, an entity formed by an amalgam of Whispers, Cloud's group battles Sephiroth. Sephiroth separates Cloud from the group, asking him to join him and defy fate. Cloud refuses and fights Sephiroth, but is defeated, although Sephiroth spares him and departs. Meanwhile, as Cloud's group leaves Midgar to pursue Sephiroth, SOLDIER Zack Fair (Caleb Pierce / Kenichi Suzumura) defeats an army of Shinra forces elsewhere, and is shown approaching Midgar carrying a wounded Cloud.

=== Intermission ===
Shortly after the bombing of Mako Reactor 5, Yuffie Kisaragi (Suzie Yeung / Yumi Kakazu), a ninja working for Wutai, arrives in Midgar and meets up with her partner Sonon Kusakabe (Aleks Le / Yoshimasa Hosoya) in order to steal Shinra's "Ultimate Materia." With the help of a local AVALANCHE cell, Yuffie and Sonon infiltrate the lab under Shinra headquarters and fight through Shinra's forces, before discovering that the Ultimate Materia is not yet complete. As they try to escape, they are confronted by a Shinra supersoldier named Nero (Sean Chiplock / Ryōtarō Okiayu). Outmatched, Sonon sacrifices himself to ensure Yuffie can escape, leaving her distraught. Yuffie escapes Shinra headquarters just in time to see the Sector 7 plate fall. Sometime later, Yuffie has left Midgar and muses that to achieve her desire to see Shinra's downfall, she will need a team to help her.

In a post-credits scenes, Cloud and his group arrive at the town of Kalm after hitching a ride with Chocobo Bill, while Zack enters the Sector 5 church in Midgar to reunite with Aerith, only to find a group of locals in mourning.

== Development ==
=== Background ===
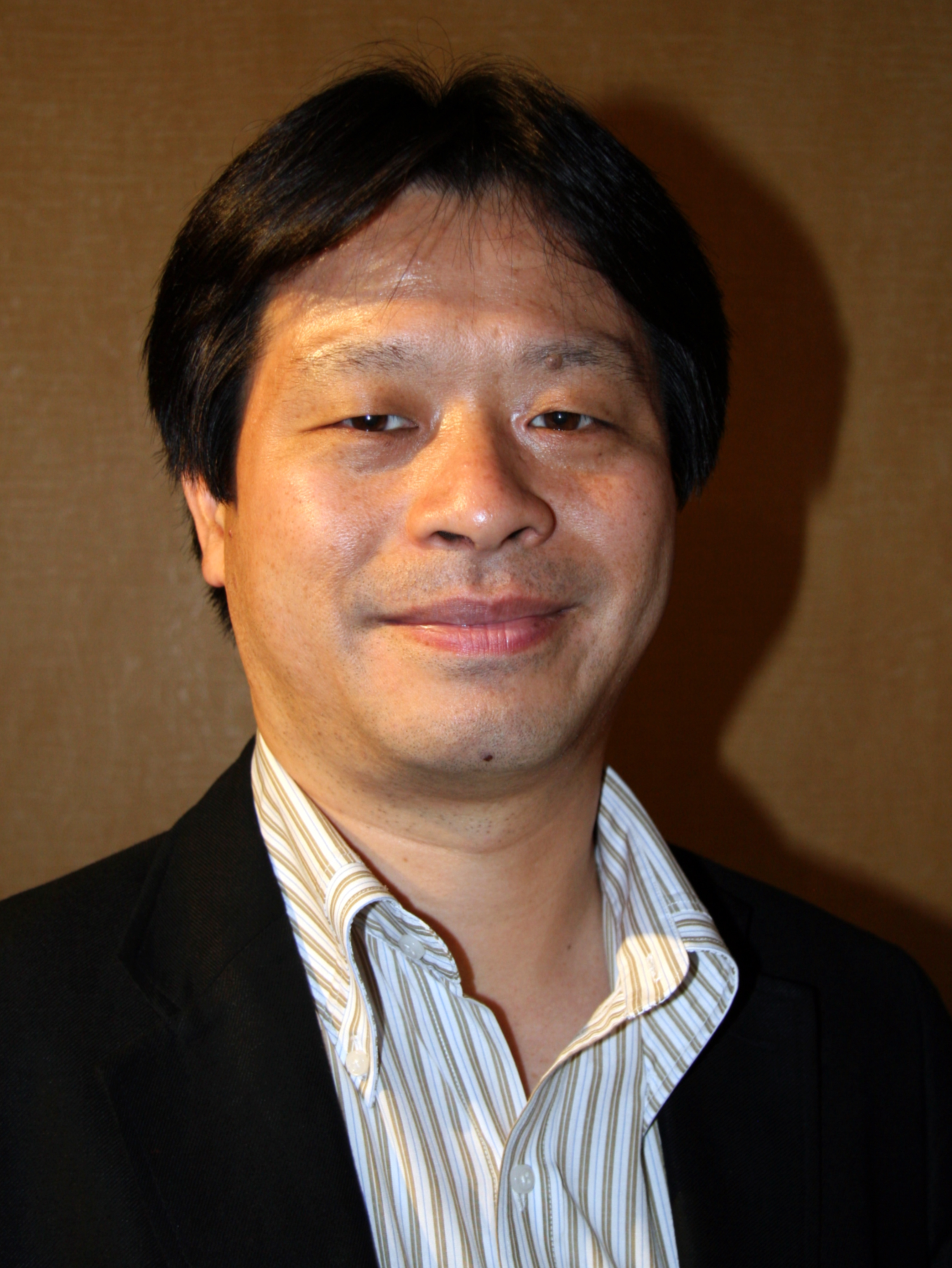
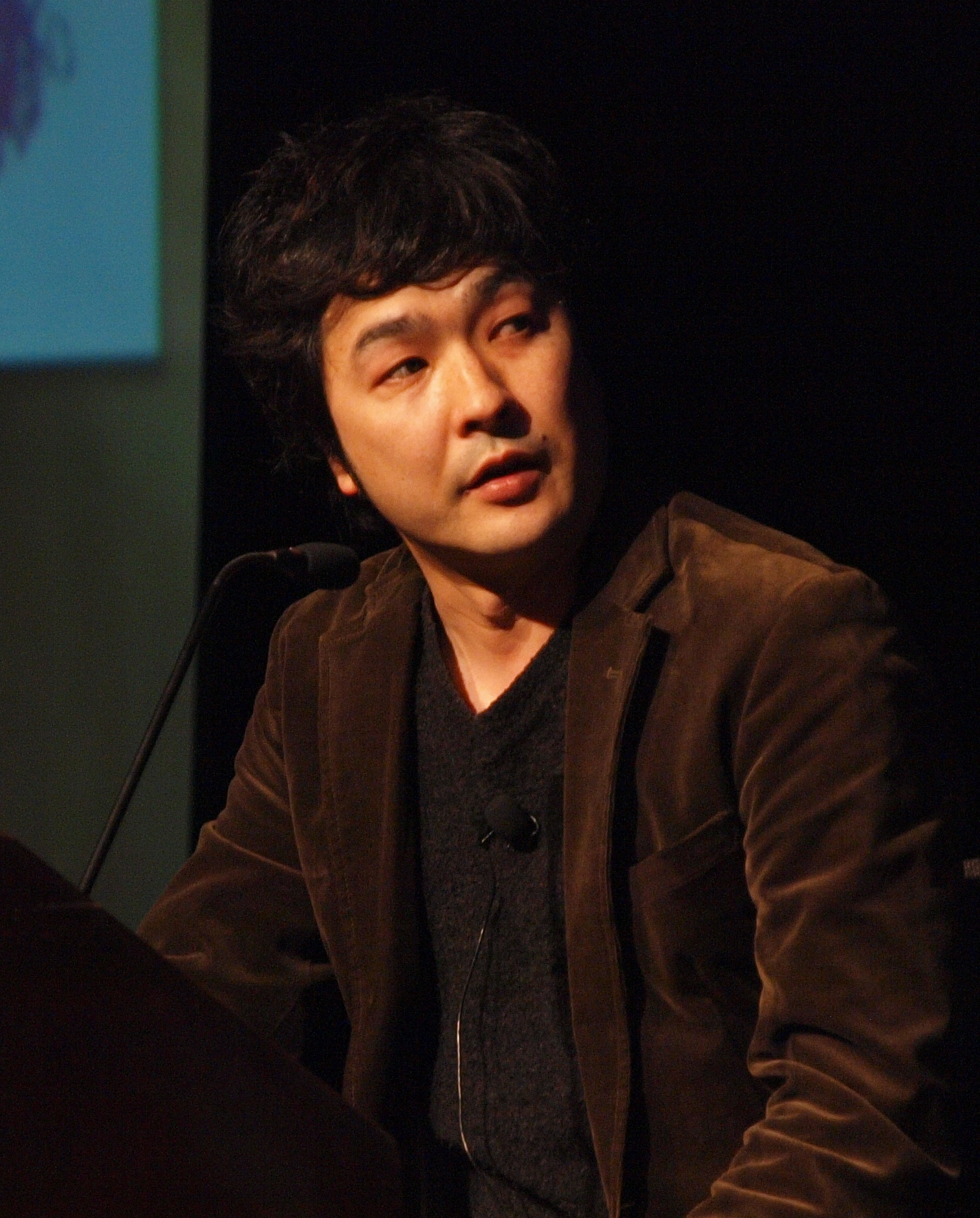
Yoshinori Kitase, director of the original game, returned as lead producer for Remake, while Motomu Toriyama directed alongside Tetsuya Nomura.

Final Fantasy VII was developed by Square for the PlayStation console and released in 1997. Its staff included producer, co-writer and series creator Hironobu Sakaguchi, director and co-writer Yoshinori Kitase, artist Yusuke Naora, character designer and co-writer Tetsuya Nomura, and writer Kazushige Nojima. It was a critical and commercial success, and established the Final Fantasy series as a major franchise. It was expanded through the multimedia project Compilation of Final Fantasy VII, comprising additional games, films, and other media.

In the early 2000s, Square announced a remake for PlayStation 2 alongside Final Fantasy VIII and IX, but nothing further was heard of the project. It was abandoned because of the increased challenge of developing on new hardware and would have necessitated cutting content. The staff were preoccupied with developing Final Fantasy XIII and its sequels, and Remake would have been an equally large or larger project hard to undertake at the same time. Once the XIII series ended, the team was free to pursue other projects. Kitase claims that since XIII, he had been asked multiple times about developing this game. Co-director Naoki Hamaguchi was originally just a fan, and said he was glad to be included.

Demand for a remake grew following a PlayStation 3 tech demo at the 2005 Electronic Entertainment Expo, showcasing the opening of Final Fantasy VII with Square's new Crystal Tools engine, which was at the time known under its codename, "White Engine". Further demand came during the game's impending tenth anniversary in 2007. On both occasions, Square denied that any remake was in development, for reasons including their focus on new games, the necessity to cut elements to make a remake manageable, the difficulty of developing for modern hardware, and the amount of development time it would require.

The Remake project began when Final Fantasy producer Shinji Hashimoto broached the subject to Kitase, Nojima, and Nomura. All three were reaching a stage of life that they defined as "that age": all felt that if they waited much longer, they might not be alive to or would be too old to develop a remake, and passing the project on to a new generation did not feel right. Another reason for developing the remake was that Square Enix was creating a library of PlayStation 4 games, and the team hoped to increase the console's popularity. Nomura was appointed as director when the remake was initially greenlit, but he was busy with the development of Kingdom Hearts III at the time.

=== Design ===
The cast was redesigned in a more realistic style. Left to right: Red XIII, Aerith Gainsborough, Cloud Strife, Barret Wallace, and Tifa Lockhart.

Final Fantasy VII Remake entered full production by late 2015, led by Business Division 1, an internal production team within Square Enix. While Nomura was involved with the project from the start, he only discovered he was the director after seeing himself credited in an internal company presentation video; he was surprised by this, as he had expected Kitase to fill the role. Nomura filled the role of director for both Final Fantasy VII Remake and Kingdom Hearts III concurrently. Another project leader was Naoki Hamaguchi, who had previously served as a programmer for Lightning Returns: Final Fantasy XIII, and as project lead for Mobius Final Fantasy. Square Enix approached developing Remake at the same level as a main numbered entry in the Final Fantasy series.

While the team had the option of simply remastering Final Fantasy VII with better graphics as many fans had requested, they noted that its graphics and many of its mechanics had become dated by modern standards. With this in mind, they decided to do a full remake, rebuilding the systems to suit contemporary tastes and using current gaming technology to recreate the world. An overarching goal of the project was to make the game feel both "new and nostalgic" for players of the original, while exemplifying the idea of Final Fantasy VII for new players. This decision led to the creation of Remake's action-based battle system, which draws from the action-based style of Dissidia Final Fantasy. Teruki Endo, who had previously worked on Monster Hunter World, served as battle director. The team aimed to retain all of the gameplay mechanics popular, including Active Time Battle, and merge them with the action-based system.

Rather than using the character models and graphical style of Advent Children, which by that point had been developed using ten-year-old technology, the team decided to create new designs and models for characters: Nomura wished to balance the realism of Advent Children with cartoon stylization. Nomura was in charge of the revamped main character designs, while designer Roberto Ferrari was in charge of designs for secondary characters. Character modeling was supervised by Visual Works, Square Enix's CGI development branch. Cloud Strife's initial redesign for Final Fantasy VII Remake departed more dramatically from the original's, but was later altered to more closely resemble Nomura's original concept. Tifa Lockhart's original appearance was changed to make her look more realistic, as the developers realized her design would not fit fight scenes.

Instead of creating a new engine, Square Enix licensed Epic Games' Unreal Engine 4, with Square Enix and Epic Games Japan working together to optimize the engine for Remake. The team received technical assistance from the developers of Kingdom Hearts III, as it had been developed using the same engine. The lighting is augmented with the lighting engine Enlighten. To help with the action gameplay and video quality, Square Enix originally partnered with video game developer CyberConnect2, with the two companies keeping in close contact due to different development styles.

In 2017, the development focus shifted from being developed with external partners to being a primarily internal project. When the company first started the Remake project, the team had to decide the entire scope of the project. There were two directions presented initially: they could expand upon the original with multiple releases, or include the entire scope of the original game in a single release. The team started to investigate what were the essential parts of the original and what parts are what the fans absolutely had to see; they quickly decided that there were so many parts that are considered essential, and fans would be upset if the team had to cut out anything. A single release with more depth would not be possible without cutting out parts of the original story. In the end, the team decided the best option for the project was to go for the highest level possible (such as within the city of Midgar, which was mostly inaccessible in the original) with an expanded story in multiple releases. Each game is planned to be on a similar scale to Final Fantasy XIII. The first part focuses on the city of Midgar due to its iconic status among the Final Fantasy community.

Regarding the scope for Remake, Nomura mentioned that many were worried about how the company would be able to make a whole game based solely on Midgar, but he didn't think it would be a problem. The story and scenario writer, Nojima, also added that ending after Midgar would also allow for an adequate amount of story scenarios. Nomura added that level designs would have to change again after the party leaves Midgar, and that they would also have to split up other scenarios.

=== Scenario ===
While developing the scenario, the team needed to work carefully, so the game did not appear too nostalgic. They needed to make decisions about what could be carried over from the original and what needed adjustment due to changes in social norms since the original's release. Despite there already being a story in place, which greatly simplified production on some fronts, Nojima was brought back in to create new story material. The scenario for the first part was completed in December 2015, covering the beginning to the escape from Midgar. Kitase observed that despite 23 years passing since the original game was released, the themes of economic inequality, corporate monopoly, and environmentalism were still relevant to the current day. Nomura expressed regret that other areas of Midgar, such as the upper plate, were inaccessible in the original game, and wanted to address that in Remake in order to give players a better sense of the city and its culture. The roles of previously minor characters were also expanded for this purpose.

The narrative has multiple changes from the original game, such as Barret being attacked by the antagonist Sephiroth and saved by a Whisper. Sephiroth appears during the Midgar scenario despite not being properly introduced until a flashback Cloud experiences. Vice noted that Cloud sees the future of Aerith in the original 1997 game, leaving her fate unknown to returning fans. Yoshinori Kitase refrained from explaining the reason for the changes from the narrative: "I want to let you know is that all of the lore from the works created after the original game, the [Compilation of Final Fantasy VII], that's all very much in the base of the canon for the remake, and going forward it will be too".

The main characters' personalities were adjusted in various ways for Remake. Rather than the "cool and collected" Cloud as seen in other games, Remake depicts his apathetic attitude as a façade to mask his insecurities. Nojima wanted to convey that his standoffishness could be seen as lame. Tifa's desire for revenge against Shinra is complicated by her reluctance to enact violence. Barret's passion and charisma rallies other characters to follow his lead. Nojima worked hard to make the interactions between these three natural. It was important to Hamaguchi to include a scene wherein Cloud has an intimate conversation with one of his teammates based on the player's choices in homage to the "date" scene from the original game. The development team avoided playing favorites between Tifa and Aerith, treating them both as main heroes. In addition to returning characters, the team decided to expand the role of minor characters and write new characters. Cloud's interactions with AVALANCHE members Biggs, Wedge, and Jessie further his character development and deepen the world of the story. Sephiroth was initially intended to be a looming presence, inspired by the shark in Jaws, to mirror his role in this section of the original game. However, Kitase reasoned that the original's Jaws-like approach would be ineffective because even new players were too familiar with the character. Hamaguchi pitched an alternate ending in which Cloud faces off with Sephiroth, which led to him appearing more and more in the remake.

The game is fully voiced, with the original plan being for the voice actors from the CGI film Final Fantasy VII: Advent Children to reprise their roles. Ultimately, the English characters were recast for Remake. According to Kitase, choosing a new generation of voices for the characters was part of the game's rebirth. The Japanese voice actors remained the same, with Takahiro Sakurai being surprised by this younger take on Cloud, having not played Cloud in the original unvoiced PlayStation video game. For the English dub, Cody Christian commented on replacing Steve Burton as the voice of Cloud, stating, "Steve, you paved the way. You made this character what it is and have contributed in shaping a legacy". He shared his intent to not "let [Burton] down" with his take on the character. John Eric Bentley voiced Barret, a character he admired when he played the 1997 game. He felt his familiarity with the original work improved his performance, aided by the translators who explained the context for his scenes. He wanted his portrayal of Barret to be multifaceted and serve as a positive example of Black representation in games. Briana White (Aerith) studied Maaya Sakamoto's acting in order to appeal to fans. Meanwhile, Britt Baron had little knowledge of Tifa when being cast, but grew to like her character. Other prominent actors include Erica Lindbeck (Jessie), Gideon Emery (Biggs), and Matt Jones (Wedge). An algorithm adjusts characters' facial motions while speaking to automatically match lip syncing and emotion in every language.

=== Music ===
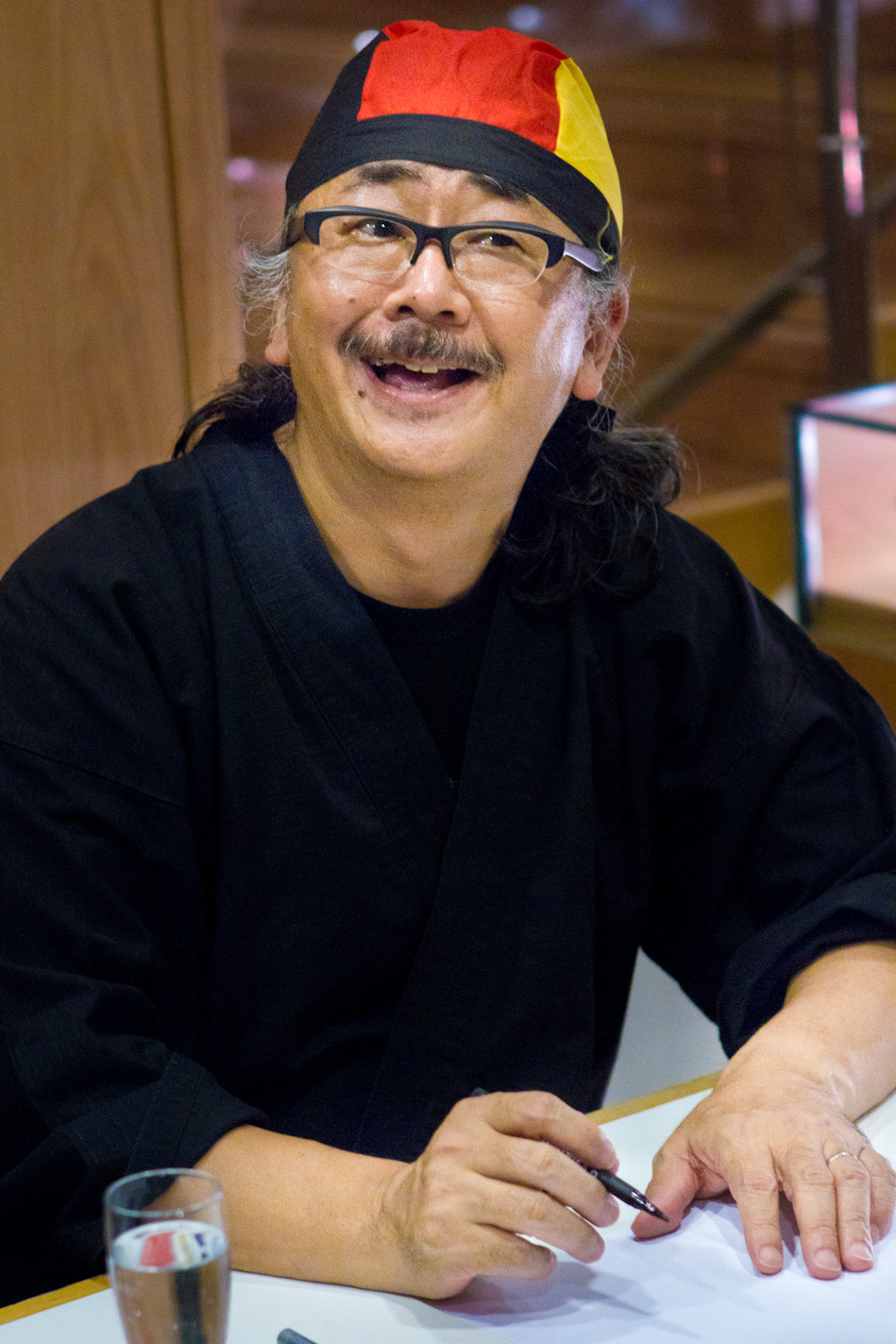
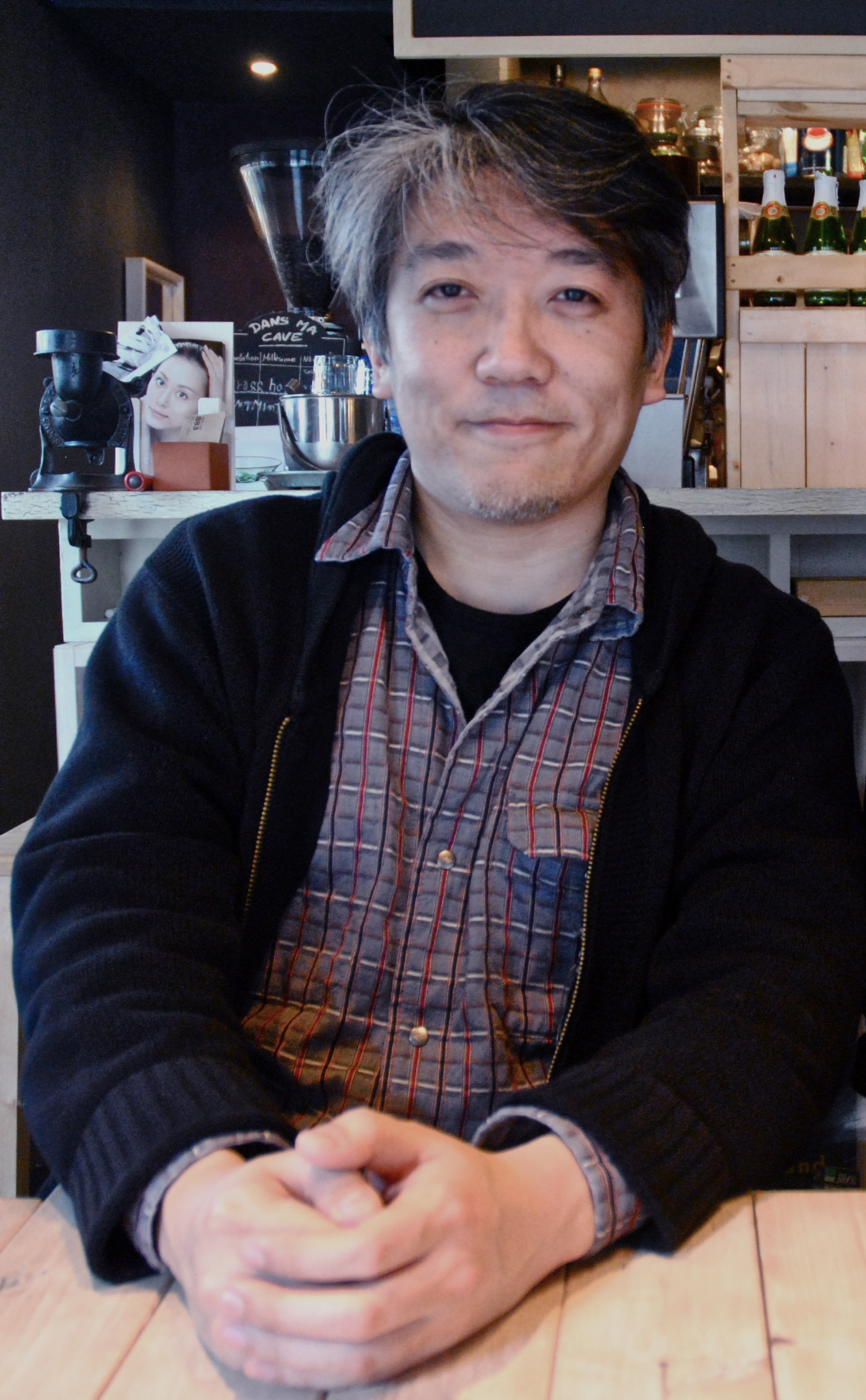
Composers Nobuo Uematsu (left) and Masashi Hamauzu (right) worked on the soundtrack, alongside several others.

The soundtrack consists primarily of arrangements of pieces Nobuo Uematsu wrote for the original Final Fantasy VII, with original tracks by several other series veterans, such as Masashi Hamauzu and Mitsuto Suzuki. Uematsu contributed one new track: the theme song, "Hollow". It was the first time Uematsu and Kitase had worked together since Final Fantasy X (2001), with Kitase initially believing Uematsu would refuse, as he had long since left Square Enix and found success as an independent composer. Nomura intended "Hollow" to reflect Cloud's state of mind; he wanted it to be a rock song with male vocals and an image of "rain". It was performed by Yosh, the vocalist for Survive Said the Prophet. Hamauzu also expressed honor in doing the music alongside Uematsu, as the original game was his first exposure to the series. Suzuki stated that the themes for Wall Market, Honeybee Inn, and Midgar Highway were among his favorite contributions.

Remake employs adaptive music, wherein multiple arrangements of a particular track are played simultaneously, fading in and out with the player's actions, such as entering or exiting a battle. Arrangements also shift within a battle depending on the emotions the developers wanted players to experience from moment to moment. Because cutscenes in Remake have voiced dialogue, the sound team needed to rearrange some tracks to accommodate this change; however, they were careful to preserve the original melodies.

== Release ==
A comparison between the original PlayStation 4 version of Remake (right) and Intergrade (left)

Following years of rumors and fan requests, Final Fantasy VII Remake was announced during Sony's conference at E3 2015. Visual Works created the announcement trailer. Square Enix's stock prices rose to their highest rating since November 2008, and the YouTube release of the reveal trailer garnered over 10 million views in the following two weeks. The game was next showcased at the 2015 PlayStation Experience, demonstrating cutscenes and gameplay from the opening sequence.

During the Final Fantasy 30th anniversary opening ceremony event hosted by Square Enix in Tokyo on January 31, 2017 – the 20th anniversary of Final Fantasy VII – the first piece of CGI key art was unveiled, along with announcements for a collaboration event with Mobius Final Fantasy. On February 18, Nomura revealed two screenshots, showing off the updated HUD. Due to its lack of footage since 2015, switch to internal development, and other projects Nomura was involved in, there were concerns about the status of the project. Speaking following E3 2018, Nomura stated that the game was in development, with his full attention shifted to it when Kingdom Hearts III was completed.

After years without substantial footage, a teaser trailer was shown during PlayStation's May 2019 State of Play broadcast. Kitase revealed that the team wanted to "try something new" on the State of Play broadcast by showing the trailer. The release date, March 3, 2020, was revealed the following month in a second teaser trailer during an orchestral concert dedicated to the music of Final Fantasy VII in Los Angeles. Further release details were announced at the company's E3 2019 press conference, including different editions of Remake. Kitase later clarified at the event that Square Enix had yet to determine the number of games in the Remake series, adding that they were in the process of planning the second installment.

An extended gameplay showcase and demo was playable at E3 2019, demonstrating parts of the opening mission, including some of the exploration, combat system, and first boss battle. The playable demo received positive reception in early previews, with praise towards the graphics, gameplay and combat system. It won three awards at the Game Critics Awards for Best of Show, Best Console Game, and Best Role-Playing Game, as well as the best looking Unreal Engine game at E3 2019. Extended footage of the demo, as well as an additional trailer, was featured at the 2019 Tokyo Game Show. Final Fantasy VII Remake was initially PlayStation 4 exclusive until 2021, with no further details about its release on other platforms at the time. The release date was pushed back from March 3 to April 10, 2020. A demo was released on the PlayStation Store on March 2, 2020, covering the first chapter.

In March 2020, Square Enix revealed that Europe and Australia would receive physical copies of Final Fantasy VII Remake early, due to growing concerns of the effect of the COVID-19 pandemic on distribution. This did not apply to downloads, as they were not directly affected by the global supply chain. Artwork of Cloud was used on buildings in Los Angeles. In June, a scene from Final Fantasy VII Remake was reproduced for the 8-bit NEC PC-88 computer by Japanese programmer Soba P.

An upgraded version of Remake for the PlayStation 5, Final Fantasy VII Remake Intergrade, was released on June 10, 2021, featuring improved visuals and shorter load times, available at no additional cost to owners of the PS4 version. It includes a PS5-exclusive DLC expansion, Episode Intermission, (Note: Stylized as Episode INTERmission) featuring the playable character Yuffie Kisaragi, who does not appear in the Midgar segment of the original game. The DLC expansion is included with the purchase of Intergrade, but must be purchased separately if using the free upgrade from the PS4 version. Intergrade adds the ability to use traditional turn-based controls while in the normal difficulty mode, a photo mode, and better overall performance in framerate and resolution. Intergrade is available in a "twin pack" with its sequel Final Fantasy VII Rebirth, first released digitally for PlayStation 5 in September 2023 ahead of the latter's launch, and later collected in a 3-disc physical bundle released on December 4, 2025.

A port of Intergrade was released for Windows on December 16, 2021, via the Epic Games Store. While anticipation was high, the port was criticised by players and critics for its stuttering and lack of customization, both stemming from a lack of optimization. It was released on Steam on June 17, 2022. Square published a novel focused on the backstories of Tifa and Aerith, Final Fantasy VII Remake: Traces of Two Pasts.

A port of Intergrade for Nintendo Switch 2 was announced by Square Enix and Nintendo during the April 2025 installment of Nintendo Direct.It was announced for release on Xbox Series X/S and the Microsoft Store on Windows by Square Enix and Microsoft during the Xbox Games Showcase in June. Both versions released on January 22, 2026. These ports introduce an additional difficulty option called "Streamlined Mode", which maximizes the party's HP, MP and Active Time Battle (ATB) gauges and enables all attacks to perform 9,999 hit points on enemies, allowing new or inexperienced players to progress through the story without the intensity of the combat encounters. Streamlined Mode was added to Intergrade on PlayStation 5 and Windows through an update alongside the launch on other consoles. For a limited time until January 31, 2026, digital purchases of Intergrade on Switch 2 and Xbox come bundled with the original Final Fantasy VII as a bonus game, based on the 2019 ports for Nintendo Switch and Xbox One, respectively. A playable demo, which is similarly structured to the one available on PlayStation 4 since 2020, was released for Nintendo Switch 2 and Xbox Series X/S on December 16, 2025. The Xbox release supports Play Anywhere cross-progression between Xbox Series X/S and the Microsoft Store versions. Intergrade is also available physically on Nintendo Switch 2 as a Game Key Card, with pre-ordered copies coming with a Magic: The Gathering play booster card set from the Final Fantasy line in limited quantities.

Remake is the first in the Final Fantasy VII Remake Series, encompassing a trilogy of games reimagining the story, world and characters of the original game. The second entry, Final Fantasy VII Rebirth, was released in 2024 for PlayStation 5, for Windows in 2025, and for Nintendo Switch 2 and Xbox Series X/S in 2026. The final entry, Final Fantasy VII Revelation, is in development and currently scheduled for release in 2027 on all the aforementioned platforms simultaneously. A prequel, Crisis Core: Final Fantasy VII Reunion – a remaster of the 2007 game Crisis Core: Final Fantasy VII – was released in December 2022. Music from Remake was included in the 2023 rhythm game Theatrhythm Final Bar Line.

== Reception ==
=== Critical response ===
Reception

Aggregate scores
Aggregator	Score
Metacritic	PS4: 87/100; PS5: 89/100; PC: 86/100; NS2: 89/100
OpenCritic	95% recommend (Note: Based on 183 critic reviews); 93% recommend (Intergrade) (Note: Based on 169 reviews)

Review scores
Publication	Score
4Players	82/100
Destructoid	PS4: 9/10; PS5: 8/10
Easy Allies	9/10
Electronic Gaming Monthly	3/5
Eurogamer	Recommended
Famitsu	39/40
Game Informer	8.75/10
GameRevolution	5/5
GameSpot	PS4: 10/10; PS5: 10/10
GamesRadar+	4.5/5
Hardcore Gamer	4/5
IGN	8/10
Jeuxvideo.com	PS4: 18/20; PS5: 18/20
PlayStation Official Magazine – UK	10/10
Push Square	8/10
RPGamer	4.5/5
Shacknews	9/10
The Guardian	5/5
USgamer	3.5/5
VG247	4/5
VideoGamer.com	8/10

Final Fantasy VII Remake received "generally favorable" reviews, according to review aggregator website Metacritic, with critics praising its faithfulness to the original game. Tamoor Hussain of GameSpot states that, while Remake is only the initial entry in a full reimagining of the original game, it is rich in details that were previously unexplored, realizes new storytelling ambitions with confidence, and presents fresh perspectives that feel both meaningful and essential in his review. To summarize, he says that it tells a smaller, more personal Final Fantasy VII tale and marries it with a smart mashup of action and RPG gameplay in order to deliver a must-play experience. Tom Marks of IGN called Remake a "complete reinvention", praising the combat system. Nahila Bonfiglio of The Daily Dot regarded it as one of the best games of 2020 based on multiple aspects that would appeal to the audience. EGM said it was captivating like the original. Eurogamer also highly regarded the remake, to the point of finding it superior to the original title.

The narrative was praised for the characters and their arcs. IGN called its "story fleshed out with real emotional arcs", praising its nostalgic feel, while criticizing the "filler" and sometimes convoluted new plot points and side missions, but concluding that the remake brings a new life into a classic while standing as a great RPG on its own. Shacknews wrote that the story in the remake is one of the strongest ever achieved by the company. In general the voiceactors were well received, with Cody Christian's performance as Cloud standing out as he enhances his character arc. His interactions with the cast and the expansion of the minor characters in AVALANCHE was also well received by writers with his confrontations with Sephiroth Destructoid agreed about the cast, most notably Aerith, noting her fun characterization. The handling of the city of Midgar and expansion of minor characters were praised by the media too.

Critical response to the new combat has been positive, partly due to the strategy needed and the distinctive fighting style of each playable character, such as Cloud wielding a sword, in contrast to Barret's shooting from afar. GamesRadar also praised the combat for the strategy required, due to each enemy having a weakness, and the variety among the characters thanks to their unique traits. RPGamer praised both the return of Materia used to provide magic attacks and the addition of upgradeable weapons in order to let players decide which equipment they want to use. RPGamer felt that Remake relied on "padding" to expand on the areas, which they considered linear for the genre. GamesRadar criticized some of the side-quests as lackluster though the interactions were better received. EGM claimed that some quests had too much padding, citing an example where the player has to constantly change the playable character to open multiple doors in the Shinra headquarters. Easy Allies said that despite the linear gameplay, the reviewers finished the game in 38 hours, and still had plenty of quests left to complete.

In regards to Intergrade, Siliconera praised the focus on Yuffie's story even if she comes across as annoying due to her younger personality but felt her relationship with Sonon improved it. Besides the new minigame, Siliconera praised the improved graphics from Intergrade. Enjoying the option of playing directly with the sidestory, Destructoid found Yuffie instead likable to the point of coming across as realistic and enjoyed her own style of gameplay. GameSpot gave it a perfect score, also finding the graphics superior, most notably due to its framerate, fitting for a PlayStation 5 game which is more notable when Cloud becomes involved in fights. PC Invasion also praised the framerate, making the PC version highly recommendable to play rather than the other ones.

=== Sales ===
Final Fantasy VII Remake sold over 3.5 million units worldwide within three days. This made it one of the biggest launches for a PlayStation 4 game and the fastest-selling PS4 exclusive, surpassing the launch sales of Marvel's Spider-Man (3.3 million; 2018) and God of War (3.1 million; 2018). By August 2020, that figure had increased to over 5 million on PS4. By September 2023, Remake had sold over 7 million copies worldwide. As of March 2025 it had sold 8.7 million copies In Japan, Final Fantasy VII Remake sold over a million copies during its first week, selling out in many stores.

In North America, Remake was the top-selling game of April 2020 and the third best-selling game of 2020, behind Call of Duty: Modern Warfare (2019) and Animal Crossing: New Horizons (2020). It became the fastest-selling Final Fantasy game, surpassing the record previously set by Final Fantasy XV (2016), and was the most downloaded PlayStation 4 game of April 2020 in the United States.

In the United Kingdom, Remake debuted at the top of the weekly sales chart, selling an estimated 60,000 physical units in its first weekend. German trade association GAME reported that it took Final Fantasy VII Remake only a few days to sell more than 100,000 units within Germany, for which it won a Gold Sales Award. It was the fourth most downloaded PlayStation 4 game of April 2020 in Europe.

=== Accolades ===
Final Fantasy VII Remake was awarded the Editors' Choice from PlayStation. It was also named IGN Japan's Game of the Year in 2020. Anime News Network and Siliconera and RPG Site listed it as one of the best games of the year.

Awards for Final Fantasy VII Remake
Year	Award	Category	Recipient(s) and nominee(s)	Result	Ref.
2019	Game Critics Awards	Best of Show	Final Fantasy VII Remake	Won	
2019	Game Critics Awards	Best Console Game	Final Fantasy VII Remake	Won	
2019	Game Critics Awards	Best Role-Playing Game	Final Fantasy VII Remake	Won	
2020	CEDEC Awards	Excellence in Sound	Final Fantasy VII Remake	Won	
2020	Golden Joystick Awards	Ultimate Game of the Year	Final Fantasy VII Remake	Nominated	
2020	Golden Joystick Awards	PlayStation Game of the Year	Final Fantasy VII Remake	Nominated	
2020	Golden Joystick Awards	Best Visual Design	Final Fantasy VII Remake	Nominated	
2020	The Game Awards 2020	Game of the Year	Final Fantasy VII Remake	Nominated	
2020	The Game Awards 2020	Best Game Direction	Final Fantasy VII Remake	Nominated	
2020	The Game Awards 2020	Best Narrative	Final Fantasy VII Remake	Nominated	
2020	The Game Awards 2020	Best Art Direction	Final Fantasy VII Remake	Nominated	
2020	The Game Awards 2020	Best Score/Music	Final Fantasy VII Remake	Won	
2020	The Game Awards 2020	Best Role-Playing Game	Final Fantasy VII Remake	Won	
2021	New York Game Awards	Big Apple Award for Best Game of the Year	Final Fantasy VII Remake	Nominated	
2021	New York Game Awards	Tin Pan Alley Award for Best Music in a Game	Final Fantasy VII Remake	Nominated	
2021	New York Game Awards	Statue of Liberty Award for Best World	Final Fantasy VII Remake	Nominated	
2021	New York Game Awards	Great White Way Award for Best Acting in a Game	Briana White as Aerith Gainsborough	Nominated	
2021	New York Game Awards	Freedom Tower Award for Best Remake	Final Fantasy VII Remake	Won	
2021	17th British Academy Games Awards	Animation	Final Fantasy VII Remake	Nominated	
2021	17th British Academy Games Awards	Performer in a Leading Role	Cody Christian as Cloud Strife	Nominated	
2021	24th Annual D.I.C.E. Awards	Game of the Year	Yoshinori Kitase, Tetsuya Nomura, and Naoki Hamaguchi	Nominated	
2021	24th Annual D.I.C.E. Awards	Role-Playing Game of the Year	Yoshinori Kitase, Tetsuya Nomura, and Naoki Hamaguchi	Won	
2021	24th Annual D.I.C.E. Awards	Outstanding Achievement in Animation	Yoshiyuki Soma, Akira Iwasawa, and Ryo Hara	Nominated	
2021	35th Japan Gold Disc Award	Soundtrack Album of the Year	Final Fantasy VII Remake	Won	
2021	21st Game Developers Choice Awards	Game of the Year	Final Fantasy VII Remake	Honorable mention	
2021	21st Game Developers Choice Awards	Best Audio	Final Fantasy VII Remake	Nominated	
2021	21st Game Developers Choice Awards	Best Design	Final Fantasy VII Remake	Honorable mention	
2021	21st Game Developers Choice Awards	Best Narrative	Final Fantasy VII Remake	Nominated	
2021	21st Game Developers Choice Awards	Best Technology	Final Fantasy VII Remake	Honorable mention	
2021	21st Game Developers Choice Awards	Best Visual Art	Final Fantasy VII Remake	Honorable mention	
2021	Japan Game Awards 2021	Award for Excellence	Final Fantasy VII Remake	Won (Note: Also awarded to nine other games)	
2022	The Steam Awards	Best Soundtrack	Final Fantasy VII Remake: Intergrade	Won	
