= Final Fantasy VII Revelation =

Upcoming video game

- Developer: Square Enix Creative Studio I
- Publisher: Square Enix
- Directors: Naoki Hamaguchi; Tetsuya Nomura; Motomu Toriyama
- Producer: Yoshinori Kitase
- Writer: Kazushige Nojima
- Series: Final Fantasy
- Engine: Unreal Engine 4
- Platforms: Nintendo Switch 2; PlayStation 5; Windows; Xbox Series X/S
- Release: April 8, 2027
- Genre: Action role-playing
- Mode: Single-player

Final Fantasy VII Revelation (Note: Japanese: ファイナルファンタジーVII リベレーション, Hepburn: Fainaru Fantajī VII Riberēshon) is an upcoming action role-playing game developed and published by Square Enix. It is the sequel to Final Fantasy VII Rebirth (2024) and the final installment of the Final Fantasy VII Remake trilogy, a series of games remaking the 1997 game Final Fantasy VII, originally released for the PlayStation.

As with its predecessors, the gameplay will combine real-time action with strategic and role-playing elements. Set immediately after Rebirth, the game will follow mercenary Cloud Strife and a party of characters principally comprising the eco-terrorist group AVALANCHE, as they journey to the Northern Crater, combatting the Shinra Electric Power Company and the emerged Weapons who awakened to defend the Planet from destruction, while preparing to make a final stand against the former elite SOLDIER Sephiroth and avert the coming of the Meteor.

Plans to split the Final Fantasy VII Remake project into multiple games were confirmed as Remake went into production in 2015. The decision for a trilogy of games was confirmed in June 2022, by which point preliminary development on the third entry had begun. Revelation had entered active production by November 2024, following Rebirth's launch, with its story finished by the following year. Its title was announced as Final Fantasy VII Revelation at the 2026 Summer Game Fest. It is scheduled for release on April 8, 2027 for Nintendo Switch 2, PlayStation 5, Windows and Xbox Series X/S.

== Gameplay ==
Revelation will be an open world game featuring a controllable airship – the Highwind. The player will be able to parachute from the ship onto the map, a first for the trilogy. The game will also feature a system called FITS (Function Integrated Tactical Suitwear) in which playable characters can equip special equipment that alters their appearance, giving them new skills and abilities taken from classic Final Fantasy classes such as Warrior or Black Mage. New playable characters first introduced as supporting cast in Final Fantasy VII Rebirth include Cid Highwind, the spear-wielding pilot of the Highwind, and Vincent Valentine, a former Shinra test subject turned ally who fights using firearms and a bestial alternate form.

== Premise ==
Final Fantasy VII Revelation continues from the events of Final Fantasy VII Rebirth (2024), concluding the overarching narrative first introduced in Final Fantasy VII Remake (2020). All three games reimagine the story, characters and world of the original Final Fantasy VII (1997). The game is set on the "Planet" and chronicles the ongoing journey of the eco-terrorist group AVALANCHE and their allies, comprising: Cloud Strife (Cody Christian/Takahiro Sakurai), Tifa Lockhart (Britt Baron/Ayumi Ito), Barret Wallace (John Eric Bentley/Mahito Funaki), Nanaki/Red XIII (Max Mittelman/Kappei Yamaguchi), Yuffie Kisaragi (Suzie Yeung/Yumi Kakazu), Cait Sith (Paul Tinto/Hideo Ishikawa), Vincent Valentine (Matthew Mercer/Shogo Suzuki), and Cid Highwind (J. Michael Tatum/Kazuhiro Yamaji). Following the death of their ally Aerith Gainsborough (Briana White/Maaya Sakamoto), AVALANCHE continues their mission of fighting against the Shinra Electric Power Company, which controls the megalopolis of Midgar and exploits mako energy, the Planet's primary source of sustenance, and defeating Sephiroth (Travis Willingham/Toshiyuki Morikawa), (Note: Willingham takes over as the English voice actor for Sephiroth, replacing Tyler Hoechlin from Remake and Rebirth, as he was unavailable during Revelation's production to reprise the role.) a former elite veteran of Shinra's SOLDIER program who was presumed killed in Nibelheim, who has summoned the destructive Meteor magic to wound the Planet, attempting to attain godhood through unity with the Lifestream, and the enactment of "Reunion", a merging of alternate timelines created through the destruction of the Whispers into a single reality he intends to rule over. Revelation will directly pick up from where Rebirth left off, adapting the remainder of the Final Fantasy VII story from the party's visit to the Great Glacier, and culminating in their final stand against Sephiroth at the Northern Crater. In addition, the party's visit to both the Shinra-occupied nation of Wutai and Rocket Town, both of which appeared in the original game's story prior to the Forgotten City, will be prominently featured after their absences from Rebirth.

== Development ==
Square Enix announced Final Fantasy VII Remake in 2015 and confirmed that it would be split into multiple games. The director, Tetsuya Nomura, said this was due to "massive undertaking" of remaking Final Fantasy VII with modern technology, which was why Square Enix had not begun development sooner despite fan demand. He said that covering the remake in one game would have necessitated cutting elements to suit modern hardware and design sensibilities, making a remake pointless. The original director and Remake producer, Yoshinori Kitase, likened the multi-game structure to that of the Final Fantasy XIII trilogy, but acknowledged that they were differentiated by the former's focus on Cloud Strife as a central protagonist, contrasting the XIII series' use of multiple characters and perspectives throughout the overarching narrative. Kitase by then, also expected each potential entry to have a gameplay length comparable to a single Final Fantasy XIII game.

Alongside revealing Remake's follow-up Final Fantasy VII Rebirth in June 2022, Kitase officially confirmed that the series was now planned to encompass a trilogy of games including a third entry that would follow Rebirth's release. In early discussions, the development team had weighed the possibility of condensing the story into two games, which created difficulties in finalizing the scope of the project and subsequent lack of clarification on how many games the story would need to span according to Kitase. By Rebirth's announcement, Nomura confirmed that early development had already begun on the third Final Fantasy VII Remake game. A "first draft" of the script was complete by September 2023, according to Kitase, but he cautioned that it would be modified based on the public's response to Rebirth. A roundtable between Nomura, Kitase, game director Naoki Hamaguchi and music supervisor Keiji Kawamori for PlayStation Blog that same month revealed that the party's trip to Yuffie Kisaragi's hometown of Wutai would not be adapted in Rebirth, nor would Cid Highwind and Vincent Valentine join the party as fully controllable characters until the next installment.

As the team finalized and debugged Rebirth, Hamaguchi spent the year prior to the game's launch in February 2024 creating plans for improvements that would be implemented in Revelation, including a fully controllable airship and larger open world, inspired by games such as The Witcher 3: Wild Hunt, Hogwarts Legacy, Horizon, and Crimson Desert, and designed to be densely packed with content. By Rebirth's launch, he described the third entry as "in the same situation" in terms of progress by that time, as Rebirth itself was following Remake's release in 2020. In November, Kitase and Hamaguchi confirmed to attendees at G-Con in South Korea that Rebirth's sequel had entered full production, and that it would debut the party's airship, the Highwind for use in the overworld, enabling players to explore from "a higher perspective" without limitations. Hamaguchi additionally confirmed that in the interest of releasing the next game as quickly as possible, the developers decided to forgo producing downloadable content for Rebirth in the vein of the "Episode INTERmission" campaign for Final Fantasy VII Remake Intergrade. By January 2025, Revelation had been in development for nine months with the story also finalized, which Hamaguchi and Kitase confirmed to Famitsu, both expressing satisfaction with its creative direction.

In September, Hamaguchi confirmed that the title for the third entry had been finalized, and was heavily informing the development due to its thematic ties to the narrative. Whereas Remake and Rebirth had "reunion" and "bonds" as their driving motifs, respectively, the main themes for Revelation were "choice" and "resolve". However, the final title was kept secret from all but a few on the development team to prevent leaks. Hamaguchi additionally assured that the third game would be "high-quality" amidst concerns that Square Enix's internal disappointment with Final Fantasy VII Rebirth's sales performance on PlayStation 5 and Windows would adversely affect development resources, while also asserting that the direction had been set in place with a lot of its content already in a playable state. Following Square Enix's announcement that the Final Fantasy VII Remake series would begin to be distributed on multiple platforms beyond PlayStation 5 and Windows, Hamaguchi confirmed that the third game was being prepared with such accommodations in mind, with the team being divided into smaller groups that were assigned to optimize for each target system, including Nintendo Switch 2 and Xbox Series X and Series S.

In January 2026, Hamaguchi provided an update at the Nintendo Switch 2 launch event for Remake Intergrade at Nintendo New York, confirming that several minigames from Final Fantasy VII Rebirth would return in "enhanced" forms for the next installment, such as Queen's Blood, and that new minigames that occur in the original game beyond Rebirth's events, such as snowboarding at the Great Glacier, would be reimagined in ways that thematically connected it to the narrative. He additionally confirmed that despite internal deliberations, the third game would continue development on a modified Unreal Engine 4 due to existing familiarity with its environment and feature set. Speaking to Bloomberg News in March, Hamaguchi also confirmed the appearance of Rocket Town, Cid's home that was omitted from Rebirth alongside Wutai in the events preceding the Forgotten City, as well as underwater traversal using the party's submarine, and a new gameplay mechanic tied to Chocobos not connected to the Chocobo breeding minigames in the original game. Combat director Teruki Endo designed the FITS system, a system that allows each character to change their play style according to Final Fantasy jobs, as an extension of combat in Rebirth without becoming too convoluted.

While promoting the Nintendo Switch 2 release of Rebirth in April 2026, Hamaguchi confirmed to NintendoLife that development of the third entry was on schedule with playtesting already underway. Hamaguchi said he had played Revelation to completion roughly 40 times by then. Its unveiling at Summer Game Fest in June 2026 confirmed that Revelation was on track for a three-year production cycle, the shortest development period across the Remake trilogy. Jason Schreier of Bloomberg News attributed this celerity to the game retaining the vast majority of the core development team from Remake and Rebirth, a contrast in organization to other high-profile projects at Square Enix that conclude with staff being disbanded after each game in a series.

== Release ==
In January 2025, producer Yoshinori Kitase confirmed to 4Gamer.net that the third Final Fantasy VII Remake entry was planned to launch within the PlayStation 5 console generation, despite concerns it would target a potential hardware successor as the developers did shifting Final Fantasy VII Rebirth to PlayStation 5 following Remake's release on PlayStation 4. The commercial performance of Rebirth, which released as a timed PlayStation 5 exclusive, disappointed Square Enix internally, which paired with a similar reception towards Final Fantasy XVI in 2023, motivated an organizational restructuring that prepared the publisher to "aggressively pursue" multiplatform distribution for future tentpole and catalog games across PlayStation, Xbox and Nintendo consoles, as well as Windows PC. Series director Naoki Hamaguchi teased in April 2025 that the Final Fantasy VII Remake series, which had exclusively released on PlayStation consoles and PC up to that point, would similarly be made available on multiple platforms.

During a stream commemorating the second anniversary of the mobile game Final Fantasy VII: Ever Crisis in September 2025, creative director Tetsuya Nomura confirmed that development was progressing smoothly and that the announcement timing had been internally decided. That same month, Square Enix officially announced that the trilogy, including the third entry, would subsequently be released for the aforementioned consoles, in addition to PlayStation 5 and Windows platforms. Both Final Fantasy VII Remake Intergrade and Final Fantasy VII Rebirth launched for Nintendo Switch 2 and Xbox Series X/S throughout 2026. Hamaguchi stated that the series' shift to launching on multiple platforms did not internally affect the development and release schedule for the third game, but also could not confirm at the time that the game would be released simultaneously on all consoles and PC. In January 2026, Hamaguchi elaborated that the developers were simultaneously working on optimizing the third entry for multiple platforms in conjunction with the ports of Remake and Rebirth, clarifying that every version of the third game would also retain gameplay and presentation parity.

Square Enix unveiled Final Fantasy VII Revelation during Summer Game Fest in June 2026, with Naoki Hamaguchi in attendance to confirm a "Spring 2027" launch on all platforms simultaneously, and Vincent Valentine voice actor Matthew Mercer present to unveil a gameplay demonstration narrated by himself. A further trailer showcasing the Weapons and open-world exploration debuted at Gamescom Opening Night Live in August, while a story trailer unveiling the game's release date was shown during Sony Interactive Entertainment's State of Play presentation the following month, the latter also being accompanied by a 10-minute gameplay demonstration showing airship traversal, Cid Highwind in gameplay, and a brief look at sidequests and the return of Queen's Blood.

Final Fantasy VII Revelation is scheduled to release on April 8, 2027 for Nintendo Switch 2, PlayStation 5, Windows and Xbox Series X/S. Unlike prior entries in the Remake series, the game will be available on Windows through Steam, Epic Games Store and Microsoft Store simultaneously, additionally supporting Play Anywhere cross-progression between the latter and Xbox Series X/S consoles. Though the game will receive a physical release on consoles, the standard edition of Revelation will ship on only one PlayStation 5 disc and require a mandatory download for additional game data, unlike the two-disc launches for both Remake and Rebirth and aligning with other console versions. As with its predecessors, the game will also be available in a Deluxe Edition at retail, and a Collectors' Edition exclusive to Square Enix's online store; the former will bundle the physical game with a reversible cover, soundtrack, artbook and a steelbook case with a collage visual depicting key events and characters across the Remake trilogy. The Collectors' Edition meanwhile, will come with all of the Deluxe Edition items and an exclusive statue of Cloud Strife, Zack Fair and Sephiroth.

Revelation is the first main Final Fantasy game to be available at launch on Xbox platforms since Final Fantasy XV (2016), as well as on a Nintendo console since Final Fantasy VI (1994); the aforementioned game was followed by an impasse between Square and Nintendo when the former chose to develop the original Final Fantasy VII and subsequent entries on the PlayStation over the Nintendo 64, while the console's successors also missed out on future numbered installments at launch. Hamaguchi expressed personal pride in bringing the main Final Fantasy games back to Nintendo hardware through Revelation, and remarked on its importance to both Nomura and Kitase, who were involved with the series' Nintendo-centric entries. Revelation is also the first mainline single-player installment to launch on Windows simultaneously with consoles.

=== Downloadable content ===
Players with save data from either previous game in the Final Fantasy VII Remake series on their respective platform will unlock early game bonuses upon starting Final Fantasy VII Revelation. Users with a saved game in Final Fantasy VII Remake Intergrade will receive the "Chocobo and Moogle" Summon Materia set, while those with Final Fantasy VII Rebirth save data will unlock the Phoenix Summon Materia for use earlier in the game. The game will receive a "Story Expansion Pass" for two post-launch story DLCs, the first focusing on Sephiroth, with the second focusing on Vincent and the Turks; release dates for both tentatively range between 2027 and 2028.
