= LittleBigPlanet fan remake of Final Fantasy VII =

Fan game

Final Fantasy VII Remake in LittleBigPlanet
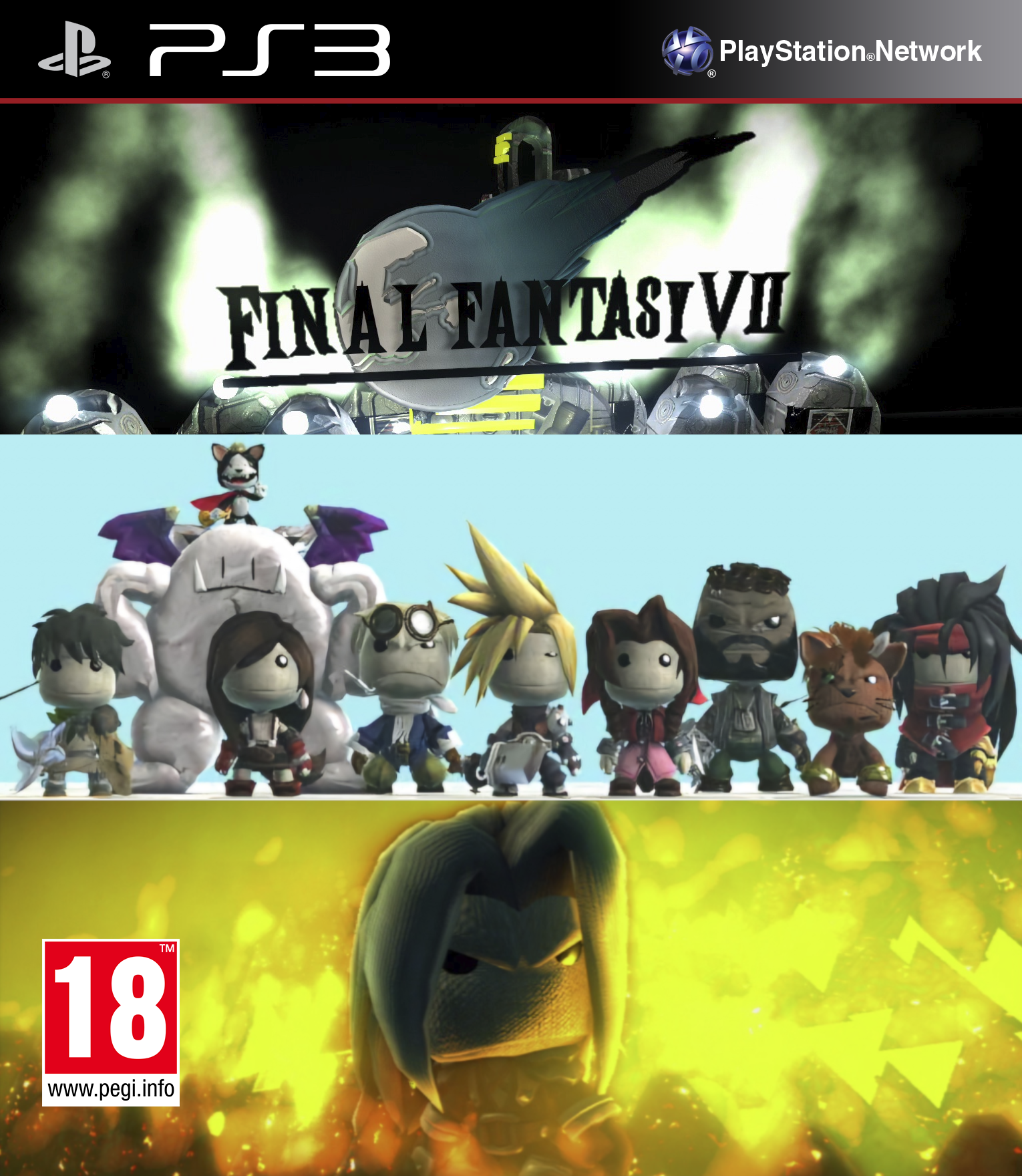
- Cover art of the Final Fantasy VII Remake in LittleBigPlanet 2
- Developer: Jamie Colliver
- Series: Final Fantasy (unofficial)
- Release: July 2024
- Genre: Role-playing
- Mode: Single-player

Final Fantasy VII Remake is an unlicensed remake of SquareSoft's role-playing video game Final Fantasy VII in the LittleBigPlanet 2 engine by Jamie Colliver. Colliver's adaptation reimagines the original game as a platformer, with all scenes, locations, dialogue, and songs from the game's original soundtrack recreated. It takes approximately 25 hours to complete. Due to the unavailability of the LittleBigPlanet servers, a playthrough is accessible on Colliver's YouTube channel through a 141-video playlist titled "Final Fantasy VII Remake in LittleBigPlanet Walkthrough".

== Gameplay ==
In Final Fantasy VII the game begins in the Lifestream, where Cloud Strife relives and witnesses his memories of the original game's story and side missions. The player controls Mini-Cloud, a reflection of Cloud's mental state in the Lifestream, through a variety of platforming levels covering his memories of the original game.

LittleBigPlanet's platforming mechanics introduce gameplay elements not present in the original Final Fantasy VII, such as a grappling hook to reach the next location and scuba gear to fight underwater enemies. The game employs a side-scrolling platformer format with a pseudo-3D aesthetic, creating a compact and visually distinct interpretation of the original world.

During boss encounters, players can switch between up to three characters, using various abilities modeled after the original turn-based system. Enemies and bosses can be defeated by jumping on their exposed Creature Brain, a gameplay mechanic unique to LittleBigPlanet.

== Development ==
Development of the project spanned over three and a half years across a ten-year period. It utilizes the official Final Fantasy VII costume kit released for LittleBigPlanet 2, featuring costumes for Cloud, Tifa Lockhart, Aerith Gainsborough, Vincent Valentine, and Sephiroth, with modifications made by Colliver. Costumes for additional characters such as Barret Wallace and Cait Sith were created independently.

Certain areas posed more significant challenges during development. Wutai, the hometown of Yuffie Kisaragi, was particularly difficult to recreate due to its complex layout, hidden paths, and numerous cutscenes. Other large areas, such as the Great Glacier and Northern Crater, required considerable adaptation to fit within the limitations of LittleBigPlanet's three-layer structure. Smaller areas like Kalm and Under Junon were comparatively easier to design. File size restrictions and storage limitations necessitated splitting the game into multiple levels.

== Reception ==
Colliver's remake has received positive attention from several media outlets, including IGN and Eurogamer. Square Enix has acknowledged the remake favourably, and Polygon described it as "shockingly good". The Mary Sue called it a "an adorable, bizarre, perfect homage and an intense labor of love".

Colliver's remake has also earned him two Guinness World Records in 2014, for the first complete Final Fantasy remake made in another video game and first role-playing game remade in LittleBigPlanet.
