= Tūnshí Tiāndì III =

1995 video game

- Title screen
- Developer(s): SKOB
- Publisher(s): SKOB
- Platform(s): Sega Mega Drive
- Release: 1995 (Hong Kong)
- Genre(s): Role-playing video game
- Mode(s): Single-player

Tūnshí Tiāndì III (Chinese: 吞食天地III; literal English translation: "Ingestion of Heaven and Earth III") is a console role-playing video game that is exclusive to the Sega Mega Drive.

The game itself was released in two versions. One version of the game is the traditional Chinese version intended for players in Hong Kong and Taiwan. The other version uses the simplified version of the Chinese language and is intended for audiences in mainland China. Despite this minor difference, the story line of these two versions are identical. The ultimate goal of the game is to conquer all of ancient China (referred to in the game as the world) by defeating bandits and local rulers. Because it was an unlicensed game from Taiwan, it was never physically distributed outside of Asia. The player control the three warriors: Liu Bei, Guan Yu, and Zhang Fei. These legends of 2nd century China have the ability to cast magical spells on enemies like tigers, barbarians, and various kinds of bosses. There are no random encounters and all encounters are visible like in EarthBound, Chrono Trigger, and Secret of Mana.

However, battles can be long and tricky like in other Chinese role-playing games like the Family Computer version of Final Fantasy VII.

== Gameplay ==
=== Magic and combat ===
Dozens of unique spells can be learned from scrolls that use the various elements of nature (wind, earth, fire, and water). Each character has to learn the spells individually with no spell sharing allowed. Spells are lost when the character that was holding them temporarily disappears from the party along with any armed weapon or armor that he was carrying. The equipment and spells are gained back right after the character re-joins the group. Symbols determine the effects of the spell. For example, a spell with an up arrow is a spell that increases the target's stats and a spell with a flame symbol on it is considered to be an attack spell (regardless of which element that spell actually belongs to). At the start of the game, a dying woman assigns the player the challenge of "conquering the world." For every enemy encounter that the player overcomes in battle, the warriors gain gold pieces and experience points. The combat system and some of the music used in the game is borrowed from vintage Final Fantasy games such as Final Fantasy VII, Final Fantasy VI and Final Fantasy IV.

=== Shopping ===
The various weapons that can be purchased in the game consist of swords, spears, and other melee weapons. Other necessities for the quest can be either purchased in town, dropped in battle by a defeated enemy, or found inside of treasure vases that are mysteriously placed inside the various dungeons of the game. A feature that is unique to this game is the option of purchasing war horses. Despite not counting as an item that can be used in the game, they increase the player's stats during battle.

=== Saving/loading the game ===
The player can save anywhere in the game except during battle and during cut scenes. Before and after saving the game, the screen shows the amount of time that elapsed since the beginning in hours, minutes, and seconds. The game can only hold up to 99 hours, 59 minutes, and 59 seconds of elapsed save time (5999.4 minutes or 4.2 days) before not counting any more time. However, the player is never penalized if he doesn't beat the game within 100 hours of beginning a new game.

== Gallery ==
This is the world map of the game; it simulates Ancient China. The yellow squares on the map are dungeons and towns that players have to explore in order to advance the plot of the game.
