= Cid Highwind =

- Final Fantasy character
- Cid Highwind artwork by Tetsuya Nomura for Final Fantasy VII
- First appearance: Final Fantasy VII (1997)
- Last appearance: Final Fantasy VII Rebirth (2024)
- Designed by: Tetsuya Nomura
- Voiced by: English: Chris Edgerly (2006—2020); J. Michael Tatum (2024–present; Japanese: Kazuhiro Yamaji (2005—present)

In-universe information
- Weapon: Spears
- Home: Rocket Town

Cid Highwind (Japanese: シド・ハイウィンド, Hepburn: Shido Haiwindo) is a playable character from Final Fantasy VII, a role-playing game by Square Enix released in 1997. He is an airship pilot who the protagonist Cloud Strife first encounters trying to restart a rocket program, which Shinra cancelled due to the actions his assistant Shera took out of concern for the safety of the rocket. Believing that her actions were not justified, he blames her for the incident and verbally abuses her. Shortly thereafter, Cid accompanies the party alongside his hydroplane, the Tiny Bronco. Cid also appears in multiple Compilation of Final Fantasy VII installments, which expand on his past as he assists Cloud and fellow character Vincent Valentine in their respective fights. He has also appeared in the Kingdom Hearts series as a seller and engineer working in Traverse Town and Hollow Bastion, assisting main protagonist Sora.

Following a recurring series of male characters in the series known as "Cid", Tetsuya Nomura designed Cid with the idea of mirroring the Dragon Knight from previous installments by fighting with a spear and performing high jumps. He was written to contrast with fellow character Barret Wallace, both short-tempered middle-aged men the player's character, Cloud, has to deal with, but each with a different obsession.

Critical response to Cid's character was initially positive, often regarded as one of the best characters in the franchise due to his attitude, design, and handling of airships, to the point of demanding a spin-off centered around him. However, later critical reception became negative as a result of his poor relationship with Shera, resulting in Square Enix changing his backstory in Final Fantasy VII Rebirth. Critics were divided if the change to the character's story from an abusive man to a caring friend of Aerith Gainsborough's mother was well-executed in the game.

== Creation and design ==
Cid's first name originates from a recurring character in previous Final Fantasy installments, starting with Final Fantasy II, each with unique personalities. He was designed by Tetsuya Nomura, who had fun creating the character, saying it was how he wanted to draw his own Cid despite having mixed feelings about the character being 32 years old. Nomura designed Cid as a curmudgeon. His fighting style was based on the "Dragoon" style from previous games. He was written to contrast with fellow Final Fantasy VII character Barret Wallace, who comes across as a man of mines in contrast to Cid's obsession with the air; Cid continuously exhibits gruff speech, has a roughneck attitude, and shows a more violent side towards Shera.

Cid's surname originates from the "dragoon hunter" class from Final Fantasy II and Final Fantasy IV. As a result, he was designed to fight with a spear in battle that he combines with outstanding jumps. He was made a heavy smoker, as he takes a cigarette every time he wins a fight. His short temper was compared by the developers to edokko, famous during the Edo period. Cid's dream of going into space was ruined the same way it is in the final version. The character would only join the player's team when the antagonist Sephiroth summons a Meteor to attack the planet, motivating Cid to pilot a rocket to destroy it with a Materia payload. However, this would come across as a suicide mission, with Cid thinking he would be going to the moon. Cloud's party would have saved him, but they are unable to convince him to join them despite telling him the truth.

For the release of Final Fantasy VII Rebirth, Cid was given additional backstory that ties into heroine Aerith Gainsborough, whose mother was revealed to be a former friend of the character. This idea originates from Kazushige Nojima's novel, Final Fantasy VII Remake Trace of Two Pasts, which explores Aerith's childhood and her mother's involvement in the story. The same story also foreshadows Cid's association with the Shinra Corporation.

In Japan, Cid is voiced by Kazuhiro Yamaji. In all of his English appearances, Cid is voiced by Chris Edgerly, who is replaced by J. Michael Tatum in Rebirth.

== Appearances ==
=== Final Fantasy VII ===
Introduced in Final Fantasy VII, Cid Highwind is a middle-aged man who dreamed of becoming the first human in space. However, just as the rocket, Shinra No. 26, was about to launch, Cid realized that an engineer named Shera had defied orders and run a last-minute double-check of the rocket's oxygen tanks. Continuing the launch on schedule would have resulted in her death, and so Cid aborted the launch in order to save her life. In the wake of this disaster, Shinra concluded that space exploration was not financially viable and withdrew funding from the project altogether upon discovering that Mako energy was a far more profitable venture. Shortly afterwards, Cid's beloved airship, the Highwind, was confiscated by Shinra. The hot-tempered Cid blamed Shera for destroying his dream, and Shera, devoted to him and the achievement of his dream, fully accepted the blame. However, her concern over the oxygen tanks is eventually proven to have merit when an explosion of the oxygen tank she was checking during the original launch temporarily traps Cid in orbit during a later successful attempt to launch the rocket into space. Afterwards, Cid finally forgives Shera, realizing she likely saved his life by performing the investigation.

The player's party, led by mercenary Cloud Strife, first meets Cid when in Rocket Town, where he waits in hopes that President Rufus Shinra has agreed to restart the space mission. However, he is displeased to learn that Rufus has only turned up because he wants the Tiny Bronco and jumps on board the plane when the party attempts to take off in it. Realizing that he is finished with Shinra, Cid joins the party. Following Cloud's disappearance, Cid, together with his airship crew, saves fellow fighter Tifa Lockhart and the party from Shinra at Junon and takes them on board the Highwind. With Cloud's disappearance, fellow party member Barret Wallace appoints Cid as the captain of the ship, and he is made temporary leader of AVALANCHE during the Huge Materia missions at Fort Condor and North Corel. Once Cloud returns, Cid flies the party in the airship Highwind to intercept Sephiroth and secure a Materia, while also being playable.

=== Compilation of Final Fantasy VII ===
Cid's past is explored in Final Fantasy VII: Before Crisis, four years before the events of Final Fantasy VII. Aside from his ambitions as an astronaut, Cid designed several aircraft and was also a great pilot. Among his designs were the propeller plane, named the "Tiny Bronco" (タイニーブロンコ, Tainī Buronko), and the "Highwind" (ハイウインド, Haiwindo) airship. Later, he became the pilot and captain of an unearthed airship of unknown ancient origin and christened it the "Shera" (シエラ, Shiera), the successor to the Highwind seen in both Final Fantasy VII Advent Children (2005) and the third-person shooting game Dirge of Cerberus: Final Fantasy VII, named in honor of Shera—in the Japanese releases, it is called the "Sierra", a Japanese phonetic equivalent to Shera.

By the time of Dirge of Cerberus: Final Fantasy VII, one year after the events of Advent Children, he is a legendary airship pilot and has become the leader of an airship division with support from the World Regenesis Organization. He arrives aboard the Shera, alongside other airships, and leads the attack against the DeepGround Soldiers in Midgar from behind the controls of his airship. At the end of the game, he contributes to defeating Omega WEAPON by destroying a Shinra reactor, cutting off the monster's power, while other reactors are destroyed by fellow AVALANCHE members and the WRO. Cid is married to Shera, who has been worried about the lead, Vincent Valentine.

Cid's role in the original game is re-explored in Final Fantasy VII Rebirth, which expands on his friendship with Ifalna, the mother of fellow character Aerith Gainsborough.

=== Kingdom Hearts ===
In the action role-playing game Kingdom Hearts, Cid fled his hometown of Hollow Bastion/Radiant Garden and ended up in Traverse Town, where he worked as a store attendant. Together with fellow Final Fantasy characters Aerith, Yuffie Kisaragi, and Leon, he aids the young protagonist Sora in his battle against the dark creatures known as Heartless. Cid later gave up his job as a store attendant and, true to his love of flying, started selling Gummi ship parts. In the ending credits of Kingdom Hearts, Cid is seen reuniting Cloud Strife with the other Final Fantasy characters, mainly Aerith. In Kingdom Hearts II, Cid operates from the wizard Merlin's House in Hollow Bastion/Radiant Garden as a member of the Hollow Bastion Restoration Committee, where a large computer has been customized for his use. While Sora and the other heroes fight the Heartless in the canyon, Cid and Merlin are left to defend the city of Hollow Bastion/Radiant Garden. The two do not get along during the game due to Cid favoring science over magic.

== Reception ==
Ryan Taljonick from GamesRadar regarded Cid as his favorite teammate in gaming due to his design and how, despite his poor temperament, his character arc helps him find redemption for his dark actions. As a result, Taljonick sees Cid as one of the most memorable characters in Final Fantasy VII. In an IGN Readers' Choice, Cid appeared as the second-best character in the franchise, and writer Phil Pirrelo regarded him as the most memorable character with the name Cid and has appealed to the writers due to his large role in the narrative, which is unique in the series. Ryan Clements and Colin Moriarty from the same site also saw Cid Highwind as the best Cid in the series, praising his outstanding role in the story and his skills in battle. Additionally, his design, including his constant smoking, was the subject of praise. Neal Chandran from RPGFan regarded the cast of Final Fantasy VII as their favorite cast of characters in RPGs. Cid's relationship with Shera represents one of the multiple lies the game's story embodies with the themes of "truth" and "lie", with both Cid and Shera having a complicated relationship as a result of the former's belief that she ruined his dream of traveling to space.

The character's job as an airship pilot also earned recognition, enough to be considered by the IGN staff one of multiple supporting characters in gaming in need of a spin-off game, especially with him showcasing his skills with both weapons and ships in the film Final Fantasy VII: Advent Children to support the main cast. Despite finding the character mean-spirited, Complex saw Cid's growth and role in the story of Final Fantasy VII, where he tries to help Cloud save the world from Sephiroth's Meteor while seeing space in the process, as a good arc for the character. In retrospect, Josh Broadwell from USA Today perceives Cid as a strange combination of both vehicular and moral support to Cloud across the game, but his constant abusive behavior towards his wife instead feels like a poor trait, as the arc the character faces feels too forced and does not develop after he stops such an act.

In Chad Concelmo's article from Destructoid, "The grumpy history of Cid", the VII take on the name is regarded as the "grumpiest Cid to ever star in a Final Fantasy game" as a result of his chaotic backstory. His relationship with Shera shows that the character still has notable growth throughout the story, enough to marry her. In The World of Final Fantasy VII: Essays on the Game and Its Legacy, Cid's dream of visiting space embodies the game's message of protecting the planet, which is seen by the writer as a weak child.

=== Portrayal in Final Fantasy VII Rebirth ===
With the release of Final Fantasy VII Rebirth, Kenneth Shepard from Kotaku criticized the lack of smoking the character has in the recently released installment, as it removes a notable part of his design that the original 1997 game not only used in cutscenes but also as part of his unique techniques, and demanded Square Enix bring it back to be faithful to the original incarnation. Also commenting on Rebirth, Zackari Greif from GameRant said Cid's backstory now comes across as bad due to how toxic his relationship with Shera was, which tied into his desire to leave her and join Cloud's group. Rebirth revised the story into something nicer, which involves him aiding Aerith's cause due to previously meeting her mother and feeling responsible to aid her. This change of backstory led to mixed reactions among fans, but the writer believes there is still room for improvement in the third Final Fantasy VII installment that retells the original game's story. Kotaku sees this change in Cid as a major improvement over the original Cid, due to the potential for a healthier relationship with Shera in a follow-up that expands on his backstory.

In "Why Final Fantasy 7 Rebirth's Cid deserved better", Cat Bussell from TechRadar lamented that Rebirth cut some parts of the character's story. In retrospect, he labeled the original Cid as "a flawed, relatable figure whose dreams of being the first person in space were curtailed by budget cuts from the ruthless Shinra corporation". In contrast, Rebirth's Cid offers a different characterization, and his role in the main narrative involving Shinra and how he meets Cloud's group is different. Rather than being an exploited worker from Shinra, he is instead a "glorified taxi service" for Cloud's sake. He lamented how Cid takes a back seat in the game and does not feel like a natural party member, even with his new connection to Aerith's family giving him the potential for a more notable role in the story. He compared this change with Yuffie Kisaragi's characterization in Rebirth, as the player never visits her hometown despite the large world Cloud can explore. ScreenRant said that Cid's debut in Rebirth was surprising due to the lack of confirmation about whether he would be playable and felt his design was revised to fit his age and look more youthful, a common change among characters in retellings of Final Fantasy VII produced by Square Enix.

In response to multiple questions, Cody Perez from Siliconera lamented that Cid was not playable in Rebirth, as the player can only hire him in the town of Gongaga for methods of transport. He claimed Cid had an inferior role compared to the original 1997 game, similar to fellow character Red XIII in Final Fantasy VII Remake, who only interacted with the main cast rather than fighting alongside them. Nevertheless, Perez still appreciated the idea of using Cid to travel across the planet in Rebirth.
