= FF7R =

FF7R or FFVIIR may refer to:

- Final Fantasy VII Remake, a 2020 action role-playing game
- Final Fantasy VII Rebirth, a 2024 action role-playing game
- Final Fantasy VII Revelation, an upcoming 2027 action role-playing game
