= Briana White =

American actress and streamer

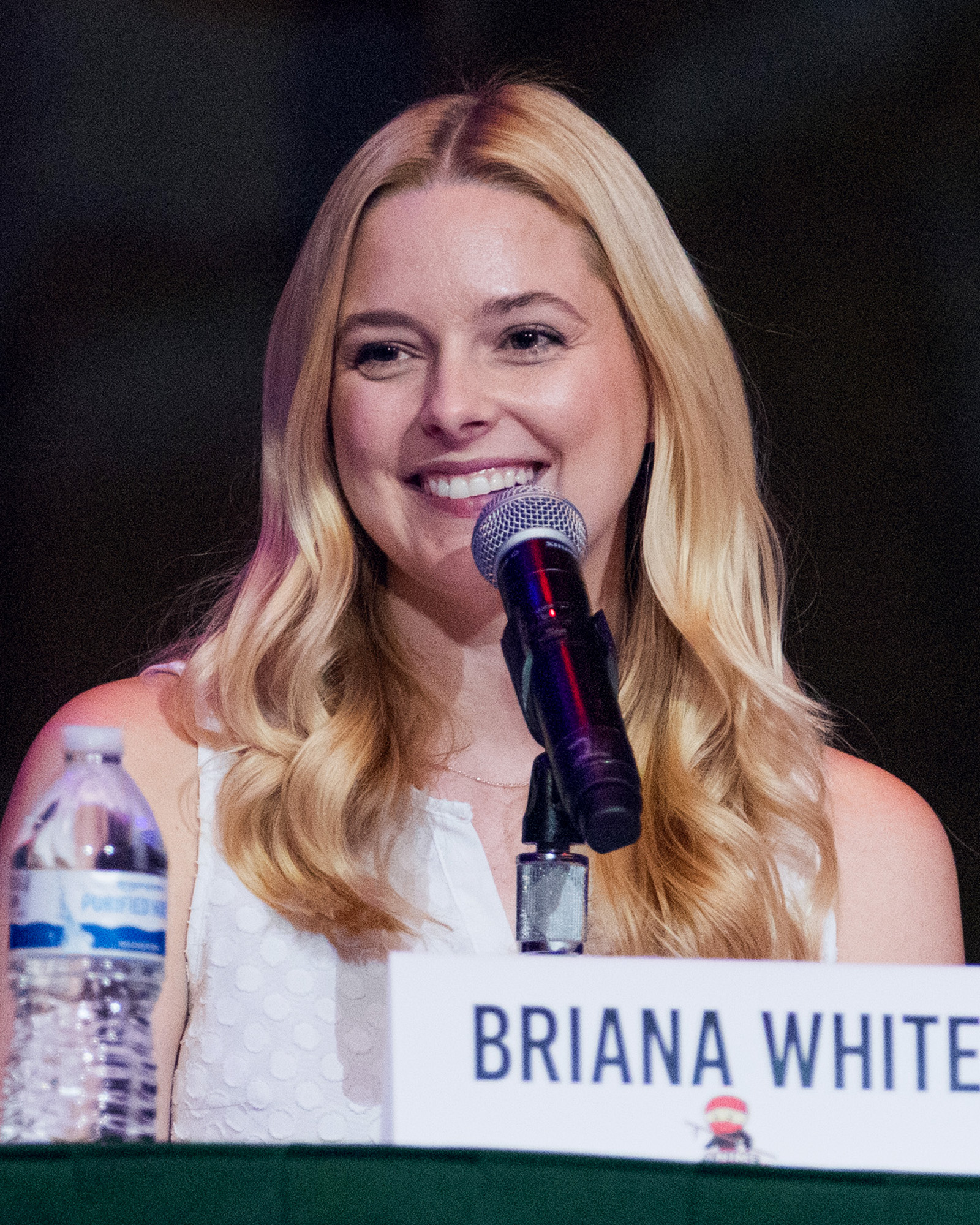
- White in 2025
- Born: April 28, 1992 (age 34); Orange County, California, U.S.
- Education: New York University (BA)
- Years active: 2014–present
- Known for: Voicing Aerith Gainsborough in Final Fantasy VII Remake series
- Website: briana-white.com

Briana White (born April 28, 1992) is an American actress and streamer, who is best known for voicing Aerith Gainsborough in the Final Fantasy VII Remake franchise, for which she received a Golden Joystick Award for Best Supporting Performer and Nominated for Best Performance at The Game Awards 2024.

== Early life ==
Briana White was born and raised in Orange County, California, United States. She developed a love of the performing arts at seven years old, and had an acting background rooted in community theater in her hometown of Orange County, California, performing and working backstage in annual shows, and directing multiple one-act plays in high school. She later graduated New York University with a Bachelor of Fine Arts degree in Theater in May 2013.

Briana grew up playing mostly Nintendo games, due to her mother also being a Nintendo fan.

== Career ==
White has several film, theater and television credits, including a leading role in the 2015 independent horror film Occupants by Russ Emanuel, a supporting role in 2016's Popstar: Never Stop Never Stopping and Jessica Townsend on an episode of Criminal Minds: Beyond Borders. In 2014, White appeared as Aurora in the "Snow White vs. Elsa" episode of Princess Rap Battle. She had created content on YouTube and Twitch under the name Strange Rebel Gaming for several years prior to doing voice acting.

In 2019, White was cast in her first voice acting role as Aerith Gainsborough in the 2020 game Final Fantasy VII Remake. Her performance received near-universal acclaim. She reprised the role in 2022's Crisis Core: Final Fantasy VII Reunion and 2024's Final Fantasy VII Rebirth. She has also played Rebirth on her streams.

In 2024, White won the Golden Joystick Award for Best Supporting Performer for her role as Aerith in Final Fantasy VII Rebirth.

== Filmography ==
=== Television ===
Year	Title	Role	Notes
2017	Criminal Minds: Beyond Borders	Jessica Townsend	Season 2, Episode 6: Party Like Me

=== Film ===
Year	Title	Role	Notes
2015	Occupants	Annie Curtis	
2016	Popstar: Never Stop Never Stopping	Fargt	Uncredited
2021	The Christmas Dance	Kate	

=== Video games ===
Year	Title	Role	Notes
2020	Final Fantasy VII Remake	Aerith Gainsborough	
2022	Crisis Core: Final Fantasy VII Reunion	Aerith Gainsborough	
2024	Final Fantasy VII Rebirth	Aerith Gainsborough	
2025	Final Fantasy Tactics: The Ivalice Chronicles	Aerith Gainsborough	
2027	Final Fantasy VII Revelation	Aerith Gainsborough	
TBA	Emberville	Unannounced role	In production

== Awards and nominations ==
Year	Award	Category	Work	Result	References
2024	Golden Joystick Awards	Best Supporting Performer	Final Fantasy VII Rebirth (Aerith Gainsborough)	Won	
2024	The Game Awards 2024	Best Performance	Final Fantasy VII Rebirth (Aerith Gainsborough)	Nominated	
