= Final Fantasy VII (NES video game) =

2005 video game

- Title screen
- Developer: Shenzhen Nanjing Technology
- Publisher: Shenzhen Nanjing Technology
- Series: Final Fantasy
- Platform: Family Computer
- Release: CHN: 2005
- Genre: Role-playing
- Mode: Single-player

Final Fantasy VII (Note: simplified Chinese: 最终幻想7; traditional Chinese: 最終幻想7; pinyin: Zuì Zhōng Huànxiǎng Qī, also called Core Crisis (Chinese: 核心危机; pinyin: Héxīn Wēijī)) is an unlicensed "Shanzhai" demake of SquareSoft's role-playing video game Final Fantasy VII, originally released for PlayStation in 1997. The two-dimensional "port" was developed and published by Chinese company Shenzhen Nanjing Technology for Subor, a Famiclone. The cartridge itself is unique, as it is structurally different from licensed Famicom cartridges in terms of hardware and programming.

The title features many gameplay elements of the original counterpart, including a three-member party structure and adaptations of the game's subsystems. Items, spells and equipment available to the player are based upon those in the original game, and although a large number have been omitted along with optional characters and some side quests, the original story was reproduced in very minute detail. Its reception was mixed, cited as an impressive achievement but at the same time criticized for the difficulty and choice of a target console.

== Gameplay ==
The player's character engaged in a cutscene (Note: The dialogue translated as "Tifa: Marlene, don't you want to chat with Cloud?")

In Final Fantasy VII, the player directs the protagonist throughout the game world with a group of three interchangeable party members, exploring areas and interacting with non-player characters. Most of it occurs within the city of Midgar for the first act, later expanding to towns, dungeons, caves, and similar areas for the rest of the game. Players can save their game at any time when not in combat to the game's single save slot.

Starting from the second act, players can journey between field screen locations via the world map, a downsized representation of Final Fantasy VII's world. Players can freely navigate the world map screen unless restricted by geographical obstacles, such as water or mountains. To overcome this, players can ride emu-like chocobos and various vehicles available to them, though usage is limited. As in other Final Fantasy–related games, travel across the world map screen and hostile areas is frequently interrupted by random enemy encounters.

=== Combat ===
In this battle, the player directs the party to attack the enemy. (Note: At the bottom left side of the screen is the command frame; the four commands are, from top to bottom: attack, magic, items and escape. And the bottom right is the status frame; the three characters are, from top to bottom: Cloud, Aerith and Barret.)

Whenever the protagonist encounters an enemy, the map changes to the "battle screen". On this, the enemy appears opposite to the three characters in the party; each battle uses a turn-based battle system similar to that featured in Final Fantasy III. All characters can physically attack the enemy, use spells from equipped materia, or use an item in one turn. Combat ends when the player either defeats all enemies and the game returns to the area map, or all party members are defeated in which case the game ends and returns to the title screen. If one of the party members successfully flees, the battle also ends.

A character's performance in battle is determined by numerical values for categories such as speed, strength, and magical power. Character statistics are driven by experience—players are awarded "experience points" for winning battles, which accumulate until characters gain "experience levels". When characters "level up", the statistics for their attributes increase permanently, which can also be amplified by the types of equipment the character is wearing. Winning battles may reward the player money (Gil) and items.

=== Equipment and abilities ===
Each character brings one materia into the party when they join, carrying one spell that can be used in combat. Materia have a limited number of uses before they must be recharged at one of the game's magic shops. Like party members, materia gain experience when used, and can be leveled up to a maximum level of nine. Characters can swap materia among themselves, with unequipped materia being used mid-battle for such things as healing party members, compensating for the limited amount of healing items.

Weapons follow the same principle as materia in terms of attack power, gaining experience and levelling up. Unlike materia, they cannot be swapped or replaced, and have unlimited usage. In addition to weapons, each has four types of armor that can be equipped for defense, which can be purchased at armor shops or found in chests scattered throughout the game. Armor directly affects the vitality statistic, which will in turn affect the amount of health gained when leveling up. Also available in the game are curative items, which can be purchased at designated shops or found in chests. These items can be used in or out of combat to restore health (HP), materia usage (CP), or revive fallen party members.

== Development ==
Final Fantasy VII was developed by SquareSoft and released worldwide in 1997 on PlayStation. At an unknown date, Shenzhen Nanjing Technology developed an unauthorized NES demake of the game. It was released in 2005, and both the box and manual make reference to Final Fantasy VII: Advent Children as the game's full title, a statement supported by the game's manual. Despite the name on the box and cartridge, the title screen simply states "Final Fantasy VII", and the game itself includes no content or plot elements from the film. The game was released on a Famicom cartridge for the Subor, a Famiclone series, though it can also be played on NES consoles through the use of an adapter.

Due to the Famicom's restricted hardware capabilities, the remake is in 2D computer graphics. Special compensation was made for some of the in-battle sprites such as Cloud Strife's, combining two 16x24 pixel sprites side by side instead of the usual single sprite to account for weapons such as Cloud's sword or Barret's gun. While most Japanese games use only 8x8-pixel hiragana or katakana fonts, and most Chinese games use 4-color 16x16-pixel tiles stored in dedicated CHR ROM pages, this game uses its own several-hundred 16x16-pixel monochrome font instead. The script itself is strewn in chunks across the code; at the beginning of each piece of text for dialog boxes is a three digit number preceded by an @-symbol, signifying which character portrait to display.

The cartridge's circuit board layout is unique compared to most Famicom games, using a single two megabyte PRG (program) ROM chips. A RAM chip is used instead of a ROM for the character graphics data, similar to the "UNROM" method used in some Nintendo games. As a result, the data is strewn across the PRG ROM in various banks. The cartridge features one 8-kilobyte battery-backed RAM chip, used for the game's single save slot. Many of the game's graphics are borrowed from other games, mostly other Final Fantasy titles and including Super NES graphics converted to four-color palettes used by the Famicom's hardware. Much of the game's music is borrowed from other games as well, in many cases shortened significantly to a few repeating notes.

== Reception ==
While the game has received praise for covering the entire story within the game, it has been described as extremely difficult, with an inconsistent battle rate and fights that take a long time to complete. Its limited healing options and slow growth rate for abilities and weapons compound this, with one reviewer recommending "play it — but cheat". Despite these issues, interest has been shown regarding the release of a patch to translate the game into English. Final Fantasy VII has additionally gained mention on several major gaming websites, including Gameworld Network, and Japan-based Gpara.com.

Another project, which aims to overhaul the game and improve upon the gameplay and graphics to better resemble the original PlayStation version, was released in 2013 by members of the Romhacking.net community. The patch, which took four years to develop, first started off as a graphics hack, but has since evolved into an extensive revamp.

The game has received praise from various sources. Journalist Derrick Sobodash stated that while the game would not be an entirely new experience for those that played the original Final Fantasy VII, he added that "...this title can hold its own against the other NES Final Fantasy games", further calling the effort "surprisingly professional". Kotaku editor Luke Plunkett cited the Famicom game as "...an achievement I have no hesitation in labeling Herculean", further calling it "...a triumph of the human spirit". Boing Boing Gadgets and Wired News writer Joel Johnson described the game as "more than just a knock-off — it's an act of true skill and commitment by an unknown team of Chinese coders". GamePro named it one of the thirteen best fan-made video game remakes, placing first on their list and described as "the video game equivalent of the Human Genome Project", despite its flaws.
