= Naoki Hamaguchi =

Japanese video game director

- 浜口直樹
- Hamaguchi in 2026
- Born: March 5, 1981 (age 45); Japan
- Education: HAL Nagoya College of Technology & Design
- Occupations: Video game director, programmer
- Years active: 2006–present
- Employer: Square Enix (since 2006)
- Known for: Final Fantasy XIII trilogy Mobius Final Fantasy; Final Fantasy VII Remake; Final Fantasy VII Rebirth; Final Fantasy VII Revelation

Naoki Hamaguchi (浜口直樹, Hamaguchi Naoki; born March 5, 1981) is a Japanese video game programmer and director. He currently works at Square Enix as Studio Head on Creative Studio 1 and as an Executive Officer in the company.

== Career ==
Hamaguchi was heavily inspired to make games after playing Final Fantasy VI, wanting to make a game of its quality. In 2003, he graduated from HAL Nagoya College of Technology & Design and in the same year entered the games industry.

After working as a programmer on the Final Fantasy XIII trilogy, Hamaguchi was appointed Project Leader of Mobius Final Fantasy. He was involved with Final Fantasy VII Remake from the start of its development, but later in development was promoted to the role of Development Leader when the project switched to using a primarily internal development structure. In March 2018, Hamaguchi stepped down from his role of Mobius Final Fantasy Project Leader in order to focus on Final Fantasy VII Remake. Former Mobius battle planner Takashi Shiraga replaced Hamaguchi as Mobius Final Fantasy Project Leader.

In April 2019, during the restructuring of the company's business divisions, Hamaguchi was promoted as co-director on Final Fantasy VII Remake alongside Nomura, making it his first directorial debut.

In February 2021, it was announced that Nomura will be stepping down as director on future Final Fantasy VII Remake titles to focus on other projects, and that Hamaguchi would become the new main director while Nomura would remain as creative director.

In 2024 Hamaguchi was promoted as studio head of Creative Studio 1, the division of Square Enix responsible for the development of Final Fantasy Remake series and Kingdom Hearts series. In the same year he was promoted as Executive officer in Square Enix alongside other developers.

== Works ==
| Year | Title | Role |
|---|---|---|
| 2006 | Final Fantasy XII | Visual effects: Real-time rendering |
| 2009 | Final Fantasy XIII | Lead cutscene programmer, Crystal Tools development staff |
| 2010 | Final Fantasy XIV | Client programmer |
| 2011 | Final Fantasy XIII-2 | Lead application programmer |
| 2013 | Lightning Returns: Final Fantasy XIII | Main programmer |
| 2015 | Mobius Final Fantasy | Project leader |
| 2020 | Final Fantasy VII Remake | Co-director (Game design/programming) |
| 2021 | Final Fantasy VII: The First Soldier | Supervisory support |
| 2024 | Final Fantasy VII Rebirth | Director |
| 2027 | Final Fantasy VII Revelation | Director |
