= Yuffie Kisaragi =

Character in Final Fantasy

- Final Fantasy character
- Yuffie Kisaragi artwork by Tetsuya Nomura for Final Fantasy VII
- First appearance: Final Fantasy VII (1997)
- Designed by: Tetsuya Nomura
- Voiced by: English: Christy Carlson Romano (Kingdom Hearts and Advent Children); Mae Whitman (Kingdom Hearts II, Dirge of Cerberus, and Kingdom Hearts III Re Mind); Suzie Yeung (Remake Intergrade, Rebirth); Brandilyn Cheah (Crisis Core Reunion); Japanese: Yumi Kakazu; Kino Sakai (Crisis Core Reunion)

In-universe information
- Weapon: Shuriken
- Home: Wutai

Yuffie Kisaragi (ユフィ・キサラギ, Yufi Kisaragi) is a character from the 1997 role-playing video game Final Fantasy VII by Square (now Square Enix), with multiple appearances throughout the Compilation of Final Fantasy VII. She was designed by Tetsuya Nomura as a young female ninja princess and thief. In her debut appearance, she is an optional party member, and can be recruited through a random encounter.

Yuffie has been featured in other Square Enix games, including the Kingdom Hearts series. She is voiced in Japanese by Yumi Kakazu and Kino Sakai, and in English by Christy Carlson Romano, Mae Whitman, Brandilyn Cheah, and Suzie Yeung. Yuffie is popular in East Asia, but her reception in Western media has been more mixed.

== Concept and design ==
During early development of Final Fantasy VII, Yuffie was envisioned as a 25-year-old ex-SOLDIER now working as a bounty hunter, seeking both the game's protagonist Cloud Strife and its antagonist Sephiroth, while having a bounty on her. Her job class was originally listed as "ninja (assassin)" and she was intended to be a daughter of the long-deceased Kasumi Kisaragi. The Wutai sidequest present in the final incarnation of the game was significantly different. Her age and description was different for each of the several wanted posters, with her appearance and level being determined by the last wanted poster viewed. She would encounter the party in a random encounter or attack Cloud when he is sleeping in an inn. The Wutai scenario required Yuffie to be recruited to complete it.

Having a close attachment to Yuffie's character, Final Fantasy VII event planner Jun Akiyama was responsible for most cutscenes featuring her and her actions during fights. Regarding the use of Japanese pronouns, Yuffie uses atashi "as opposed to the other female characters who use watashi, perhaps to make her sound more cute or youthful, as she is younger than the others". Mae Whitman, who voiced Yuffie in the English versions of Kingdom Hearts II and Dirge of Cerberus, said she was not "aware of the extent to which people were familiar with her character already". In a 2012 interview, Whitman recalled Yuffie as "bubbly and bright and nice. But still super cool!" Yuffie's design in Kingdom Hearts was partially based on the original appearance of Rikku from Final Fantasy X. In the downloadable content (DLC) INTERmission for Final Fantasy VII Remake Intergrade, Yuffie wears a Moogle hood, which she puts on during covert missions and is a reference to her appearance in Dirge of Cerberus: Final Fantasy VII. Director Motomu Toriyama chose to focus the story of the DLC on Yuffie over Vincent Valentine, stating that her optionality in the original game allowed them to expand her backstory. Yuffie's original design was altered to include more realistic details while preserving its ninja aspects and Japanese style. While the tissue physics in the model run in real time, Yuffie's legwarmers are individually adjusted so they do not fall off. Suzie Yeung, who voiced her in the DLC, was unaware of Yuffie's popularity and surprised by the positive fan reception to her inclusion in the remake. In Final Fantasy VII Rebirth, director Naoki Hamaguchi expressed a desire to leverage the new gameplay and battle mechanics introduced in INTERmission, such as team-up attacks performed by Yuffie and Sonon Kusakabe, as he felt they made for a "different feel in battle strategy".

=== Voice actresses ===
Yuffie is voiced in Japanese by Yumi Kakazu and Kino Sakai. Voice actresses who provided the voice of Yuffie in English include Christy Carlson Romano for Kingdom Hearts and Final Fantasy VII: Advent Children; Mae Whitman for Kingdom Hearts II, Dirge of Cerberus: Final Fantasy VII, and Kingdom Hearts III Re Mind; Brandilyn Cheah for Crisis Core: Final Fantasy VII Reunion; and Suzie Yeung for Final Fantasy VII Remake Intergrade and Final Fantasy VII Rebirth.

== Appearances ==
=== Final Fantasy VII ===
Yuffie appears in the 1997 role-playing video game Final Fantasy VII as one of two optional party members along with Vincent Valentine. She is a 16-year-old ninja and thief who wields shurikens that she can throw like a boomerang. She is a fiercely patriotic daughter of Godo Kisaragi (ゴドー・キサラギ, Godō Kisaragi), the leader of the nation of Wutai (ウータイ, Ūtai), which is based on East Asia; Yuffie feels her country has lost its former glory and become nothing more than a resort town. After losing the war against the Shinra Electric Power Company, Godo began to turn Wutai into a tourist attraction. This did not suit Yuffie, who ran off, stealing Materia from travelers in hopes of someday becoming strong enough to change the situation. Yuffie is sneaky and arrogant, has a tomboyish and charismatic personality, and obsessively steals and collects Materia. She also tends to be short-tempered and is prone to motion sickness. In combat, Yuffie possesses the special Materia "Throw", enabling her to throw most items from the player's inventory at enemies during combat. When leveled up, she unlocks the ability "Coin", allowing her to throw the party's currency at the enemy.

Yuffie ambushes the protagonist Cloud Strife and his allies in a random encounter in a forest biome, appearing as "Mystery Ninja". If the player defeats her in combat and then chooses the correct series of dialogue choices, she joins the player's party as one of the player characters. Once in Wutai Village, Yuffie steals the party's Materia and hides, but she is kidnapped by a Don Corneo, a Midgar crime lord. Once the group rescues Yuffie, she returns the stolen Materia and continues working with them. In another sidequest, she proves herself by fighting the bosses of Wutai's five-story pagoda, the last of which is against Godo. These fights, and the subsequent sequence of conversations, enable her and Godo to understand each other and come to a mutual respect. At Godo's request, Cloud officially takes Yuffie, who obtains her level 4 Limit Break "All Creation", with him on his quest.

If Yuffie is present when Aerith Gainsborough is murdered by Sephiroth, she shows an uncharacteristic display of emotion, as she breaks down in Cloud's arms after failing to control her emotions. Yuffie's loyalty to the team is called into question after Cloud temporarily disbands his party ahead of their final confrontation with Sephiroth; when Yuffie is the last to return, Barret Wallace suspects her of abandoning the team in light of her earlier treachery at Wutai. When Yuffie returns to the group, she rebukes Barrett for his judgement.

Yuffie is featured in Final Fantasy VII Remake, appearing as the sole playable character in its bonus downloadable content (DLC) INTERmission, which takes place in parallel to the story of the main game. She and her partner Sonon Kasukabe infiltrate Midgar to steal the "Ultimate Materia" from Shinra. When the mission goes wrong, Sonon sacrifices himself to save Yuffie, and she resolves to gather allies to take down Shinra. She returns as a party member in Final Fantasy VII Rebirth.

=== Compilation of Final Fantasy VII ===
Yuffie as seen in the CGI animated film Final Fantasy VII: Advent Children

In the 2005 animated film Final Fantasy VII: Advent Children, Yuffie reunites with her allies to fight against the summon creature Bahamut SIN. In the On the Way to a Smile novella "Case of Yuffie", which is set between the end of Final Fantasy VII and the beginning of Advent Children, the disease Geostigma spreads to Wutai, and Yuffie sets out to find a cure.

In the 2004 action role-playing game Before Crisis, which is set six years before Final Fantasy VII, Yuffie encounters Shinra's agents called the Turks in Wutai and unknowingly works with them against the eco-terrorist group AVALANCHE. In the 2006 third-person shooter game Dirge of Cerberus, which is set one year after Advent Children, Yuffie leaves home and joins the World Regenesis Organization, where she is placed in charge of espionage and intelligence gathering.

A nine-year-old Yuffie makes brief appearances in the 2007 action role-playing game Crisis Core: Final Fantasy VII, where she fights against Shinra following their invasion and takeover of Wutai. After meeting Zack Fair, she enlists his help to find treasures in several side missions.

=== Other appearances ===
Outside the Final Fantasy series, Yuffie has also been featured in the Kingdom Hearts series. In the first game, a younger Yuffie acts as a supporting character in Traverse Town, helping to defeat the Heartless who destroyed her world. Yuffie also appears in Kingdom Hearts: Chain of Memories as a projection from Sora's memories in Traverse Town. In Kingdom Hearts II, she aids Leon and the others as part of the Hollow Bastion Restoration Committee, and appears in her Advent Children attire. In Kingdom Hearts and Kingdom Hearts II, Yuffie is featured as an opponent in the Olympus Coliseum, while Kingdom Hearts Coded features a virtual simulation of her. She also appears in the DLC Re Mind for Kingdom Hearts III.

Yuffie is an unlockable playable character in the PlayStation version of the 1998 fighting game Ehrgeiz: God Bless the Ring, appearing alongside other characters from Final Fantasy VII. She is also one of the playable characters in the PlayStation Portable version of the 2006 party video game Itadaki Street, in a chibi-style design similar to her model during the exploration gameplay mode of Final Fantasy VII, and in the 2013 action puzzle mobile game Pictlogica Final Fantasy, also in a chibi form. She was the first DLC character released for the 2014 rhythm game Theatrhythm Final Fantasy: Curtain Call. Yuffie also appears as a playable character in the free-to-play role-playing video games Final Fantasy Record Keeper and Dissidia Final Fantasy Opera Omnia.

Yuffie also makes appearances in some video games as a non-playable character. In the 2008 fighting game Dissidia Final Fantasy, she appears as a tutor of the in-game manuals and an unlockable friend card. She is a "Legend" type assist character in the 2012 mobile game Final Fantasy Airborne Brigade. Yuffie also appears in the 2018 fighting game Super Smash Bros. Ultimate as a spirit.

== Reception ==
Yuffie Kisaragi has received a notably positive reception in Japan and overseas, being described as one of the best ninja and overall video game characters. Electronic Gaming Monthly listed Yuffie's reappearance as one of the greatest moments of Kingdom Hearts. David Smith from IGN included her on their top ten Final Fantasy VII characters, stating that she "belongs in the Wacky Sidekicks wing of the RPG hall of fame". Although commenting that Yuffie can sometimes be "a pain in the neck", Smith said that she became such an appealing sidekick character that Square would go on to use the "Yuffie formula" with Rikku for Final Fantasy X.

Final Fantasy VII director Yoshinori Kitase asked EGM "why American gamers love Yuffie so much". They were unable to come with a clear answer. According to Edge, Yuffie, being one of characters that are "brands in and of themselves", created a new anime stereotype of giddy girl ninja. WomanGamers.com gave the character an overall score of 7.0/10, opining that while an "18 year old ninja girl was a nice refreshing change [...] it would have been nice if her character had matured and developed through this story". Jef Rouner of the Houston Press described Yuffie's reaction to Aerith's death as one of the five most heartbreaking, missable scenes in the Final Fantasy franchise, which he felt rivaled the emotional impact of anything found in the main narrative. In his review for Advent Children, James Mielke of 1UP.com called her "as cutely jailbait as ever"; the film itself was called "Ogling Legal-Age Yuffie" by Geson Hatchett of Hardcore Gamer.

Yuffie's character also garnered negative reception. In her character profile, IGN called her "both impressively useful and incredibly annoying". GameFan editor The 6th Man compared himself to Yuffie, as "in one word—annoying" but also having "that innocent, naive qualify". In 2010, Scott Sharkey of 1UP.com described her as being in the category of "The Perky Idiot" alongside Rikku and Selphie while discussing the top five character types in the Final Fantasy series. That same year, GamesRadar's Mikel Reparaz called her as "hyper-annoying". In 2013, Kyle Lowe of Complex called her as the fifth most annoying classic video game character. Joe Juba of Game Informer included her among "Final Fantasy's particular breed of annoying companions, like Selphie and Vaan". Lisa Foiles of The Escapist included her in their "crazy, hyperactive teenager" on her top five annoying princesses in video games, calling her "just a definition of annoying". As a result of calling her an unimportant character in Final Fantasy VII due to how difficult is to get her, Paste regarded Yuffie's portrayal in the remake as far more entertaining take on Yuffie due to her role in the narrative, while Kotaku praised and said that she's "irresistibly charming as Yuffie".

== See also ==
- Ninjas in popular culture
