= Final Fantasy VII =

1997 video game

- North American cover art, featuring the game's protagonist, Cloud Strife
- Developer: Square (Note: Ported to iOS and Android by D4 Enterprise. Ported to modern Windows PC, PlayStation 4, Nintendo Switch, and Xbox One by DotEmu.)
- Publishers: PlayStation; JP: Square; WW: Sony Computer Entertainment; Windows; Eidos Interactive; Later releases; Square Enix
- Director: Yoshinori Kitase
- Producer: Hironobu Sakaguchi
- Programmer: Ken Narita
- Artists: Yusuke Naora; Tetsuya Nomura
- Writers: Yoshinori Kitase; Kazushige Nojima
- Composer: Nobuo Uematsu
- Series: Final Fantasy
- Platforms: PlayStation; Windows; iOS; PlayStation 4; Android; Nintendo Switch; Xbox One
- Release: January 31, 1997: PlayStation; JP: January 31, 1997; NA: September 7, 1997; PAL: November 17, 1997 International; JP: October 2, 1997 Windows; NA/PAL: June 25, 1998 Re-release; NA/PAL: August 14, 2012; JP: May 16, 2013 iOS; WW: August 19, 2015 PlayStation 4; WW: December 5, 2015 Android; WW: July 7, 2016 Switch, Xbox One; WW: March 26, 2019
- Genre: Role-playing
- Mode: Single-player

Final Fantasy VII (Note: Japanese: ファイナルファンタジーVII, Hepburn: Fainaru Fantajī Sebun) is a 1997 role-playing video game developed and published by Square for the PlayStation. The seventh main installment in the Final Fantasy series, it was released in Japan by SquareSoft (now known as Square Enix) and internationally by Sony Computer Entertainment, becoming the first game in the main series to have a PAL release. The game's story follows Cloud Strife, a mercenary who joins an eco-terrorist organization to stop a world-controlling megacorporation from using the planet's life essence as an energy source. Ensuing events send Cloud and his allies in pursuit of Sephiroth, a superhuman who seeks to wound the planet and harness its healing power to be reborn as a god. Throughout their journey, Cloud bonds with his party members, including Aerith Gainsborough, who holds the secret to saving their world.

Development began in 1994, originally for the Super Nintendo Entertainment System. After delays and technical difficulties from experimenting with several platforms, most notably the Nintendo 64, Square moved production to the PlayStation, largely due to the advantages of the CD-ROM format. Veteran Final Fantasy staff returned, including series creator and producer Hironobu Sakaguchi, director Yoshinori Kitase, and composer Nobuo Uematsu. The title was the first in the series to use full motion video and 3D computer graphics, featuring 3D character models superimposed over 2D pre-rendered backgrounds. Although the gameplay remained mostly unchanged from previous entries, Final Fantasy VII introduced more widespread science fiction elements and a more realistic presentation. The combined development and marketing budget amounted to approximately US$80 million.

Final Fantasy VII received widespread critical acclaim upon release and was a commercial success. Critics praised its graphics, gameplay, music, and story, although some criticism was directed towards the original English localization. It remains widely regarded as a landmark title and one of the greatest and most influential video games of all time. The title won numerous Game of the Year awards and is credited for boosting the sales of the PlayStation and popularizing Japanese role-playing games worldwide. Its success has led to enhanced ports on various platforms, a multimedia subseries called the Compilation of Final Fantasy VII, and a high-definition remake trilogy comprising Final Fantasy VII Remake (2020), Final Fantasy VII Rebirth (2024), and Final Fantasy VII Revelation (2027).

== Gameplay ==
The gameplay of Final Fantasy VII is similar to earlier Final Fantasy titles and Japanese role-playing games. The game features three modes of play: the world map, the field, and the battle screen. At its grandest scale, players explore the world of Final Fantasy VII on a 3D world map. The world map contains representations of areas for the player to enter, including towns, environments, and ruins. Natural barriers—such as mountains, deserts, and bodies of water—block access by foot to some areas; as the story progresses, the player receives vehicles that help traverse these obstacles, thus opening more of the game world for exploration. Chocobos can be found in certain spots on the map and, if caught, can be ridden to areas inaccessible on foot or by vehicle. In field mode, the player navigates fully scaled versions of the areas represented on the world map. VII marks the first time in the series that the mode is represented in a three-dimensional space. In this mode, the player can explore the environment, talk with characters, advance the story, and initiate event games. Event games are short minigames that use special control functions and are often tied to the story. While in field mode, the player can also make use of shops and inns. Shops allow the player to buy and sell items that can aid Cloud and his party, such as weapons, armor, and accessories. Inns restore the hit points and mana points of characters who rest at them and cure abnormalities contracted during battles.

A battle scene with Cloud, Barret, and Tifa facing a dragon. At this point, the player must choose a command for Cloud to perform.

At random intervals on the world map and in field mode, and at specific moments in the story, the game will enter the battle screen, which places the player characters on one side and the enemies on the other. It employs an Active Time Battle (ATB) system, in which the characters exchange moves until one side is defeated. The damage or healing dealt by either side is quantified on screen. Characters have several statistics that determine their effectiveness in battle; for example, hit points determine how much damage they can take, and magic determines how much damage they can inflict with spells. Each character on the screen has a time gauge; when a character's gauge is full, the player can input a command for them to perform. The commands change as the game progresses, and are dependent on the characters in the player's party and on the abilities, spells, etc., the player has added to their equipment. Commands include attacking with a weapon, casting magic, using items, summoning monsters, and other actions that either damage the enemy or aid the player characters. Final Fantasy VII also features powerful, character-specific commands called Limit Breaks, which can be used only after a special gauge is charged by taking enemy attacks. After being attacked, characters can be afflicted by one or more abnormal "statuses", such as poison or paralysis. These statuses and their adverse effects can be removed by special items or abilities or by resting at an inn. Once all enemies are defeated, the battle ends, and the player is rewarded with money, items, and experience points. If the player is defeated, it is game over and the game must be loaded from the last save point.

When not in battle, the player can use the menu screen, where they can review each character's status and statistics, use items and abilities, change equipment, save the game when on the world map or at a save point, and manage orbs called Materia. Materia are the main method of customizing characters in Final Fantasy VII, and can be added to equipment to provide characters with new magic spells, monsters to summon, commands, statistical upgrades, and other benefits. Materia level up through their own experience point system and can be combined to create different effects.

== Synopsis ==
=== Setting and characters ===
Final Fantasy VII takes place on a world referred to in-game as the "Planet" and retroactively named "Gaia". The planet's lifeforce, called the Lifestream, is a flow of spiritual energy that gives life to everything on the Planet; its processed form is known as "Mako". On a societal and technological level, the game has been defined as an industrial or post-industrial science fiction setting. During Final Fantasy VII, the Shinra Electric Power Company, a world-dominating megacorporation headquartered in the city of Midgar, is draining the Planet's Lifestream for energy, weakening the Planet and threatening its existence and all life. Significant factions within the game include AVALANCHE, an eco-terrorist group seeking Shinra's downfall so the Planet can recover; the Turks, a covert branch of Shinra's security forces; SOLDIER, an elite Shinra fighting force created by enhancing humans with Mako; and the Cetra (also known as the Ancients), a near-extinct human tribe which maintains a strong connection to the Planet and the Lifestream.

The main protagonist is Cloud Strife, an aloof mercenary who claims to be a former 1st Class SOLDIER. Early on, he works with two members of AVALANCHE: Barret Wallace, its brazen but fatherly leader; and Tifa Lockhart, a shy yet nurturing martial artist and his childhood friend. During their journey, they meet Aerith Gainsborough, a carefree flower merchant and one of the last surviving Cetra; Red XIII, an intelligent feline from a tribe that protects the planet; Cait Sith, a fortune-telling robotic cat controlled by repentant Shinra staff member Reeve Tuesti; and Cid Highwind, a pilot whose dream of being the first human in outer space was unrealized. The group can also recruit Yuffie Kisaragi, a young ninja and skilled Materia thief; and Vincent Valentine, a former Turk and victim of Shinra's experiments. The game's main antagonists are Rufus Shinra, the son of President Shinra and the later leader of the Shinra Corporation; Sephiroth, a former SOLDIER who reappears several years after being presumed dead; and Jenova, a hostile extraterrestrial life-form who the Cetra imprisoned 2,000 years ago and who Sephiroth was created from. A key character in Cloud's backstory is Zack Fair, a member of SOLDIER and Aerith's first love.

=== Plot ===
AVALANCHE destroys a Shinra Mako reactor in Midgar, but an attack on another reactor goes wrong and Cloud falls into the city's slums. There, he meets Aerith and protects her from Shinra. Meanwhile, Shinra finds AVALANCHE's base of operations and intentionally collapses part of the upper city level in retaliation for the Mako reactor being destroyed, killing many AVALANCHE members and innocent bystanders as collateral damage. Aerith is also captured since Shinra believes that as a Cetra, she can potentially reveal the "Promised Land", which they believe is overflowing with Lifestream energy they can exploit. Cloud, Barret, and Tifa rescue Aerith, and during their escape from Midgar, discover that Sephiroth murdered President Shinra despite being presumed dead five years earlier. The party pursues Sephiroth across the Planet, with now-President Rufus on their trail; they are soon joined by the rest of the playable characters.

At a Cetra temple, Sephiroth reveals he intends to use a powerful magical artifact known as "Black Materia" to cast the spell "Meteor", which would have a devastating impact on the Planet. Sephiroth claims he will absorb the Lifestream as it attempts to heal the wound caused by Meteor, and become a god-like being in the process. The party retrieves the Black Materia, but Sephiroth manipulates Cloud into surrendering it. Aerith departs alone to stop Sephiroth and follows him to an abandoned Cetra city. While Aerith prays to the Planet for help, Sephiroth attempts to force Cloud to kill her; after this fails, he kills her himself before fleeing, leaving the White Materia behind. The party then learns of Jenova, a hostile alien lifeform who landed on the Planet two thousand years prior to the game's events. Upon arrival on the Planet, Jenova began infecting the Cetra with a virus, and they were nearly wiped out. However, a small group managed to seal away Jenova in a tomb, which Shinra later unearthed. At Nibelheim, Jenova's cells were used in experiments which led to the creation of Sephiroth. Five years before the game's events, Sephiroth and Cloud visited Nibelheim, where Sephiroth learned of his origins and was driven insane as a result. He murdered the townspeople, and then vanished after Cloud confronted him.

At the Northern Crater, the party learns that the "Sephiroths" they have encountered are Jenova clones who the insane Shinra scientist Hojo created. Cloud confronts the real Sephiroth as he is killing his clones to reunite Jenova's cells, but is again manipulated into giving him the Black Materia. Sephiroth then taunts Cloud by showing another SOLDIER in his place in his memories of Nibelheim, suggesting that Cloud is a failed clone of Sephiroth. Sephiroth summons Meteor and seals the Crater as Cloud falls into the Lifestream and Rufus captures the party.

After escaping Shinra, the party discovers Cloud at an island hospital in a catatonic state from Mako poisoning, and Tifa decides to stay as his caretaker. When a planetary defense force called Weapon attacks the island, the two fall into the Lifestream, where Tifa helps Cloud reconstruct his memories. Cloud was a mere infantryman who was never accepted into SOLDIER; the SOLDIER in his memories was his friend Zack. At Nibelheim, Cloud ambushed and wounded Sephiroth after the latter's mental breakdown, but Jenova preserved Sephiroth's life. Hojo experimented on Cloud and Zack for four years, injecting them with Jenova's cells and Mako. They managed to escape, but Zack was killed in the process. The trauma of these events triggered an identity crisis in Cloud, and he constructed a false persona based around Zack's stories and his own fantasies. Cloud accepts his past and reunites with the party, who learn that Aerith's prayer to the Planet had been successful: the Planet had attempted to summon Holy to prevent Meteor's impact, but Sephiroth prevented it from having any effect.

Shinra fails to destroy Meteor, but manages to defeat a Weapon and puncture the Northern Crater as Rufus seemingly dies in the process. After killing Hojo, who is revealed to be Sephiroth's biological father, the party descends to the Planet's core through the opening in the Northern Crater and defeats both Jenova and Sephiroth. The party escapes and Holy is summoned once again, destroying Meteor with help from the Lifestream. Five hundred years later, Red XIII is seen with two cubs looking out over the ruins of Midgar, which are now covered in greenery, showing that the planet has healed.

== Development ==
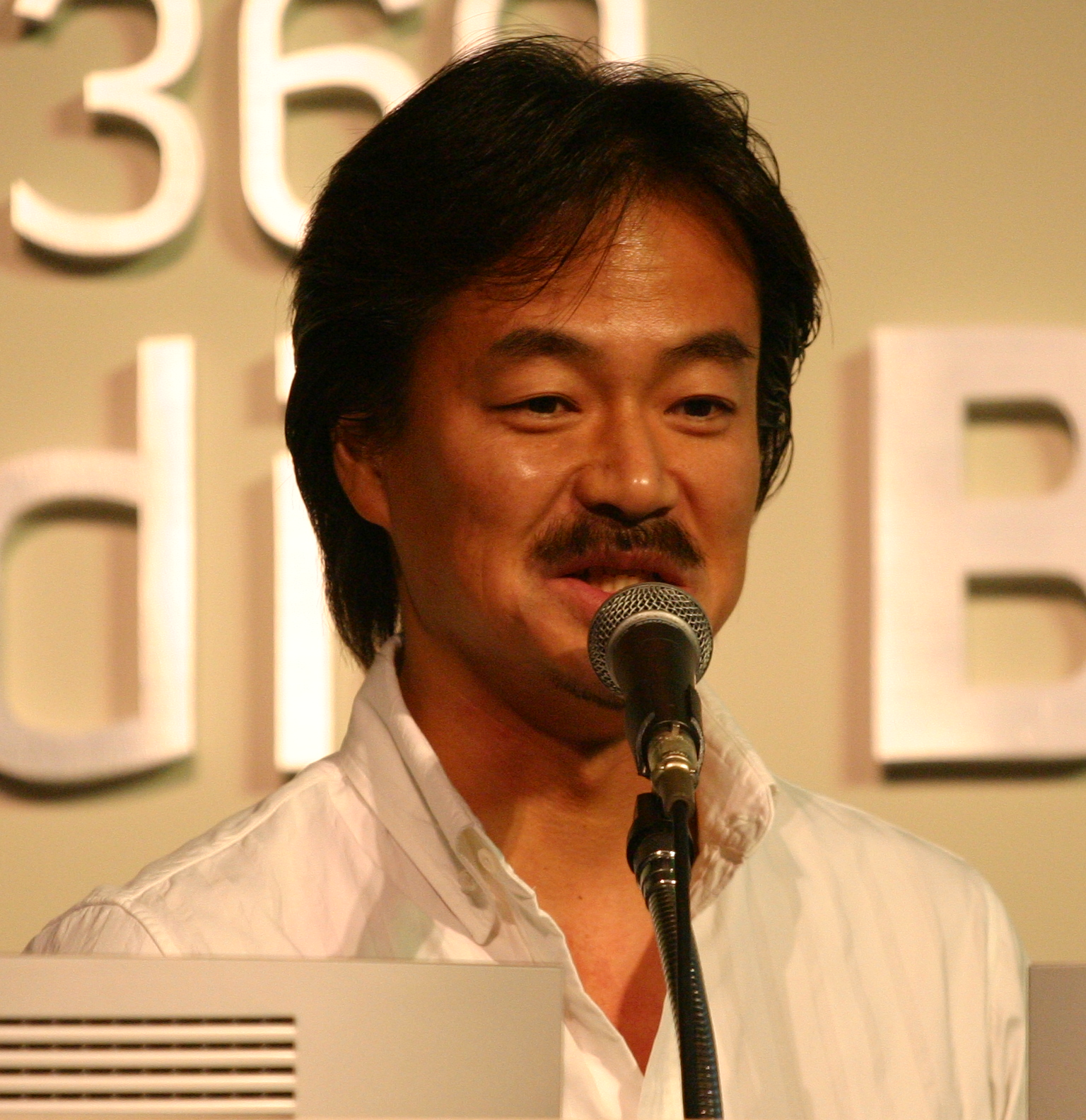
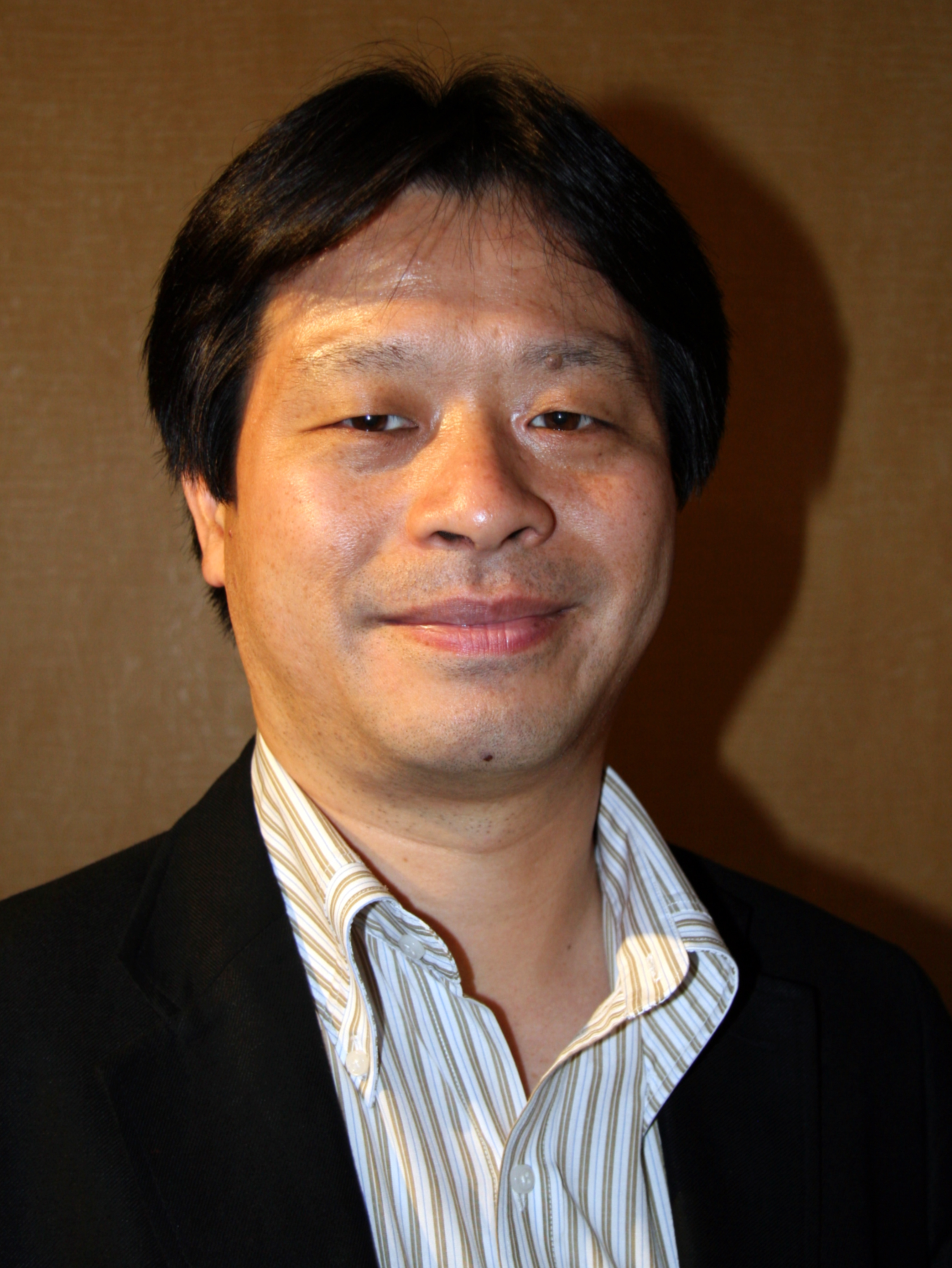
Producer Hironobu Sakaguchi and director Yoshinori Kitase, who together helped create the story and gameplay concepts for Final Fantasy VII

Initial concept talks for Final Fantasy VII began in 1994 at Square studio, following the completion of Final Fantasy VI (1994). As with the previous installment, series creator Hironobu Sakaguchi reduced his role to producer and granted others a more active role in development: these included Yoshinori Kitase, one of the directors of FFVI. The next installment was planned as a 2D game for Nintendo's Super Nintendo Entertainment System (Super NES). After creating an early 2D prototype of it, the team postponed development to help finish Chrono Trigger (1995). Once Chrono Trigger was completed, the team resumed discussions for Final Fantasy VII in 1995.

The team discussed continuing the 2D strategy, which would have been the safe and immediate path just prior to the imminent industry shift toward 3D gaming; such a change would require radical new development models. The team decided to take the riskier option and make a 3D game on new generation hardware but had yet to choose between the cartridge-based Nintendo 64 or the CD-ROM–based PlayStation from Sony Computer Entertainment. The team also considered the Sega Saturn console and Microsoft Windows. Their decision was influenced by two factors: a highly successful tech demo based on Final Fantasy VI using the new Softimage 3D software, and the escalating price of cartridge-based games, which was limiting Square's audience. Tests were made for a Nintendo 64 version, which would use the planned 64DD peripheral despite the lack of 64DD development kits and the prototype device's changing hardware specifications. This version was discarded during early testing, as the 2000 polygons needed to render the Behemoth monster placed excessive strain on the Nintendo 64 hardware, causing a low frame rate. It would have required an estimated thirty 64DD discs to run Final Fantasy VII properly with the data compression methods of the day. Faced with both technical and economic issues on Nintendo's current hardware, and impressed by the increased storage capacity of CD-ROM when compared to the Nintendo 64 cartridge, Square shifted development of Final Fantasy VII, and all other planned projects, onto the PlayStation.

The Final Fantasy VII staff at one point were planning to use a first person camera for world map exploration with enemies visible on the world map terrain and also wanted up to 10 characters to be in your party at once in the battle scenes. In the final version, the overall gameplay system remained mostly unchanged from Final Fantasy V (1992) and VI, but with an emphasis on player control. The initial decision was for battles to feature shifting camera angles. Battle arenas had a lower polygon count than field areas, which made creating distinctive features more difficult. The summon sequences benefited strongly from the switch to the cinematic style, as the team had struggled to portray their scale using 2D graphics. In his role as producer, Sakaguchi placed much of his effort into developing the battle system. He proposed the Materia system as a way to provide more character customization than previous Final Fantasy games: battles no longer revolved around characters with innate skills and roles in battle, as Materia could be reconfigured between battles. Artist Tetsuya Nomura also contributed to the gameplay; he designed the Limit Break system as an evolution of the Desperation Attacks used in Final Fantasy VI. The Limit Breaks served a purpose in gameplay while also evoking each character's personality in battle.

Square retained the passion-based game development approach from their earlier projects, but now had the resources and ambition to create the game they wanted. This was because they had extensive capital from their earlier commercial successes, which meant they could focus on quality and scale rather than obsessing over and working around their budget. Final Fantasy VII was at the time one of the most expensive video game projects ever, costing an estimated US$40 million, which adjusted for inflation came to $61 million in 2017. Development of the final version took a staff of between 100 and 150 people just over a year to complete. As video game development teams were usually only 20 people, the game had what was described as the largest development team of any game up to that point. The development team was split between both Square's Japanese offices and its new American office in Los Angeles; the American team worked primarily on city backgrounds.

=== Art design ===
Promotional artwork of the main cast. The main characters were designed by Tetsuya Nomura; Final Fantasy VII was his first role as character designer.

The game's art director was Yusuke Naora, who had previously worked as a designer for Final Fantasy VI. With the switch into 3D, Naora realized that he needed to relearn drawing, as 3D visuals require a very different approach than 2D. With the massive scale and scope of the project, Naora was granted a team devoted entirely to the game's visual design. The department's duties included illustration, modeling of 3D characters, texturing, the creation of environments, visual effects, and animation. The Shinra logo, which incorporated a kanji symbol, was drawn by Naora personally. Promotional artwork, in addition to the logo artwork, was created by Yoshitaka Amano, an artist whose association with the series went back to its inception. While he had taken a prominent role in earlier entries, Amano was unable to do so for Final Fantasy VII, due to commitments at overseas exhibitions. His logo artwork was based on Meteor: when he saw images of Meteor, he was not sure how to turn it into suitable artwork. In the end, he created multiple variations of the image and asked staff to choose which they preferred. The green coloring represents the predominant lighting in Midgar and the color of the Lifestream, while the blue reflected the ecological themes present in the story. Its coloring directly influenced the general coloring of the game's environments.

Another prominent artist was Nomura. Having impressed Sakaguchi with his proposed ideas, which were handwritten and illustrated rather than simply typed on a PC, Nomura was brought on as main character designer. Nomura stated that when he was brought on, the main scenario had not been completed, but he "went along like, 'I guess first off you need a hero and a heroine', and from there drew the designs while thinking up details about the characters. After [he'd] done the hero and heroine, [he] carried on drawing by thinking what kind of characters would be interesting to have. When [he] handed over the designs [he'd] tell people the character details [he'd] thought up, or write them down on a separate sheet of paper". Something that could not be carried over from earlier titles was the chibi sprite art, as that would not fit with the new graphical direction. Naora, in his role as an assistant character designer and art director, helped adjust each character's appearance so the actions they performed were believable. When designing Cloud and Sephiroth, Nomura was influenced by his view of their rivalry mirroring the legendary animosity between Miyamoto Musashi and Sasaki Kojirō, with Cloud and Sephiroth being Musashi and Kojirō respectively. Sephiroth's look was defined as kakkoii, a Japanese term combining good looks with coolness. Several of Nomura's designs evolved substantially during development. Cloud's original design of slicked-back black hair was deemed "not very heroic", so developers changed his hair color to bright blond. Vincent's occupation changed from researcher to detective to chemist, and finally to a former Turk with a tragic past.

=== Scenario ===
Sakaguchi was responsible for writing the initial plot, which was quite different from the final version. In this draft for the planned SNES version, the game's setting was envisioned as New York City in 1999. Similar to the final story, the main characters were part of an organization trying to destroy Mako reactors, but they were pursued by a hot-blooded detective named Joe. The main characters would eventually blow up the city. An early version of the Lifestream concept was present at this stage. According to Sakaguchi, his mother had died while Final Fantasy III (1990) was being developed, and choosing life as a theme helped him cope with her death in a rational and analytical manner. Square eventually used the New York setting in Parasite Eve (1998). While the planned concept was dropped, Final Fantasy VII still marked a drastic shift in setting from previous entries, dropping the Medieval fantasy elements in favor of a world that was "ambiguously futuristic".

The cutscene of Sephiroth killing Aerith Gainsborough. This key story sequence has been called one of the most shocking, cinematic, and genre-defining moments in video games.

When Kitase was put in charge of Final Fantasy VII, he and Nomura reworked the entire initial plot. Scenario writer Kazushige Nojima joined the team after finishing work on Bahamut Lagoon (1996). While Final Fantasy VI featured an ensemble cast of numerous playable characters that were equally important, the team soon decided to develop a central protagonist for FFVII. The pursuit of Sephiroth that formed most of the main narrative was suggested by Nomura, as nothing similar had been done in the series before. Kitase and Nojima conceived AVALANCHE and Shinra as opposing organizations and created Cloud's backstory as well as his relationship to Sephiroth. Among Nojima's biggest contributions to the plot were Cloud's memories and split personality; this included the eventual conclusion involving his newly created character of Zack. The crew helped Kitase adjust the specifics of Sakaguchi's original Lifestream concept.

Regarding the overall theme of the game, Sakaguchi said it was "not enough to make 'life' the theme, you need to depict living and dying. In any event, you need to portray death." Consequently, Nomura proposed killing off the heroine. Aerith had been the only heroine, but the death of a female protagonist would necessitate a second; this led to the creation of Tifa. The developers decided to kill Aerith, as her death would be the most devastating and consequential. Kitase wanted to depict it as very sudden and unexpected, leaving "not a dramatic feeling but great emptiness", "feelings of reality and not Hollywood". The script for the scene was written by Nojima. Kitase and Nojima then planned that most of the main cast would die shortly before the final battle; Nomura vetoed the idea because he felt it would undermine the impact of Aerith's death. Several character relations and statuses underwent changes during development. Aerith was to be Sephiroth's sister, which influenced the design of her hair. The team then made Sephiroth a previous love interest of hers to deepen her backstory, but later swapped him with Zack. Vincent and Yuffie were to be part of the main narrative, but due to time constraints, they were nearly cut and eventually relegated to being optional characters.

Nojima was charged with writing the scenario and unifying the team's ideas into a cohesive narrative, as Kitase was impressed with his earlier work on the mystery-like Heracles no Eikō III: Kamigami no Chinmoku (1992), an entry in the Glory of Heracles series. To make the characters more realistic, Nojima wrote scenes in which they would occasionally argue and raise objections: while this inevitably slowed down the pace of the story, it added depth to the characters. The graphical improvements allowed even relatively bland lines of dialogue to be enhanced with reactions and poses from the 3D character models. Voice acting would have led to significant load times, so it was omitted. Masato Kato wrote several late-game scenes, including the Lifestream sequence and Cloud and Tifa's conversation before the final battle. Initially unaffiliated with the project, Kato was called on to help flesh out less important story scenes. He wrote his scenes to his own tastes without outside consultation, something he later regretted.

=== Graphics ===
With the shift from the SNES to the next generation consoles, Final Fantasy VII became the first project in the series to use 3D computer graphics. Aside from the story, Final Fantasy VI had many details undecided when development began; most design elements were hashed out along the way. In contrast, with Final Fantasy VII, the developers knew from the outset it was going to be "a real 3D game", so from the earliest planning stage, detailed designs were in existence. The script was also finalized, and the image for the graphics had been fleshed out. This meant that when actual development work began, storyboards for the game were already in place. The shift from cartridge ROM to CD-ROM posed some problems: according to lead programmer Ken Narita, the CD-ROM had a slower access speed, delaying some actions during the game, so the team needed to overcome this issue. Certain tricks were used to conceal load times, such as offering animations to keep players from getting bored. When it was decided to use 3D graphics, there was a discussion among the staff whether to use sprite-based characters on 3D backgrounds or fully rendered polygonal models. While sprites proved more popular with the staff, the polygon models were chosen as they could better express emotion. This decision was influenced by the team's exposure to the 3D character models used in Alone in the Dark (1992). Sakaguchi decided to use deformed models for field navigation and real-time event scenes, for better expression of emotion, while realistically proportioned models would be used in battles. The team purchased SGI Onyx supercomputers and related workstations, and accompanying software including Softimage 3D, Alias PowerAnimator, and Nichimen N-World for an estimated total of $21 million. Many team members had never seen the technology before.

The pre-rendered backgrounds, such as this scene in Midgar, provided the developers with a choice of camera angle, giving a more cinematic experience.

The transition from 2D graphics to 3D environments overlaid on pre-rendered backgrounds was accompanied by a focus on a more realistic presentation. In previous entries, the sizes for characters and environments were fixed, and the player saw things from a scrolling perspective. This changed with Final Fantasy VII; environments shifted with camera angles, and character model sizes shifted depending on both their place in the environment and their distance from the camera, giving a sense of scale. The choice of this highly cinematic style of storytelling, contrasting directly with Square's previous games, was attributed to Kitase, who was a fan of films and had an interest in the parallels between film and video game narrative. Character movement during in-game events was done by the character designers in the planning group. While designers normally cooperate with a motion specialist for such animations, the designers taught themselves motion work, resulting in each character's movements differing depending on their creators—some designers liked exaggerated movements, while others went for subtlety. Much of the time was spent on each character's day-to-day, routine animations. Motion specialists were brought in for the game's battle animations. The first characters the team worked with were Cloud and Barret. Some of the real-time effects, such as an explosion near the opening, were hand-drawn rather than computer-animated.

The main creative force behind the overall 3D presentation was Kazuyuki Hashimoto, the general supervisor for these sequences. Being experienced in the new technology the team had brought on board, he accepted the post at Square as the team aligned with his own creative spirit. One of the major events in development was when the real-time graphics were synchronized to computer-generated full motion video (FMV) cutscenes for some story sequences, notably an early sequence where a real-time model of Cloud jumps onto an FMV-rendered moving train. The backgrounds were created by overlaying two 2D graphic layers and changing the motion speed of each to simulate depth perception. While this was not a new technique, the increased power of the PlayStation enabled a more elaborate version of this effect. The biggest issue with the 3D graphics was the large memory storage gap between the development hardware and the console: while the early 3D tech demo had been developed on a machine with over 400 megabytes of total memory, the PlayStation only had two megabytes of system memory and 500 kilobytes for texture memory. The team needed to figure out how to shrink the amount of data while preserving the desired effects. This was aided with reluctant help from Sony, who had hoped to keep Square's direct involvement limited to a standard API package, but they eventually relented and allowed the team direct access to the hardware specifications.

Final Fantasy VII features two types of cutscenes: real-time cutscenes featuring polygon models on pre-rendered backgrounds, and FMV cutscenes. The game's computer-generated imagery (CGI) FMVs were produced by Visual Works, a then-new subsidiary of Square that specialized in computer graphics and FMVs creation. Visual Works had created the initial movie concept for a 3D game project. The FMVs were created by an international team, covering both Japan and North America and involving talent from the gaming and film industry; Western contributors included artists and staff who had worked on the Star Wars film series, Jurassic Park, Terminator 2: Judgment Day, and True Lies. The team tried to create additional optional CGI content which would bring optional characters Vincent and Yuffie into the ending. As this would have further increased the number of discs the game needed, the idea was discarded. Kazuyuki Ikumori, a future key figure at Visual Works, helped with the creation of the CGI cutscenes, in addition to general background design. The CGI FMV sequences total around 40 minutes of footage, something only possible with the PlayStation's extra memory space and graphical power. This innovation brought with it the added difficulty of ensuring that the inferiority of the in-game graphics in comparison to the FMV sequences was not too obvious. Kitase has described the process of making the in-game environments as detailed as possible to be "a daunting task".

=== Music ===
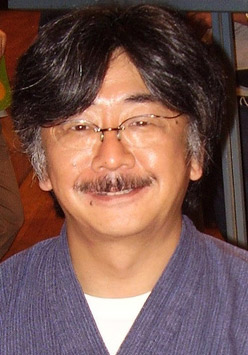
Nobuo Uematsu composed, arranged, and produced the entire soundtrack for Final Fantasy VII.

"One-Winged Angel"
"One-Winged Angel", the theme used during a part of the final battle against Sephiroth, is recognized by many as one of Uematsu's best works. The track uses high-quality digitized voices, a first for the series.

The musical score of Final Fantasy VII was composed, arranged, and produced by Nobuo Uematsu, who had served as the sole composer for the six previous Final Fantasy games. Originally, Uematsu had planned to use CD quality music with vocal performances to take advantage of the console's audio capabilities but found that it resulted in the game having much longer loading times for each area. Uematsu then decided that the higher-quality audio was not worth the trade-off with performance, and opted instead to use MIDI-like sounds produced by the console's internal sound sequencer, similar to how his soundtracks for the previous games in the series on the Super NES were implemented. While the Super NES only had eight sound channels to work with, the PlayStation had twenty-four. Eight were reserved for sound effects, leaving sixteen available for the music. Uematsu's approach to composing the game's music was to treat it like a film soundtrack and compose music that reflected the mood of the scenes, rather than trying to make strong melodies to "define the game", as he felt that approach would come across too strong when placed alongside the game's new 3D visuals. As an example, he composed the track intended for the scene in the game where Aerith Gainsborough is killed to be "sad but beautiful", rather than more overtly emotional, creating what he felt was a more understated feeling. Uematsu additionally said that the soundtrack had a feel of "realism", which also prevented him from using "exorbitant, crazy music".

The first piece that Uematsu composed for the game was the opening theme; game director Yoshinori Kitase showed him the opening cinematic and asked him to begin the project there. The track was well received in the company, which gave Uematsu "a sense that it was going to be a really good project". Final Fantasy VII was the first game in the series to include a track with high-quality digitized vocals, "One-Winged Angel", which accompanies a section of the final battle of the game. The track has been called Uematsu's "most recognizable contribution" to the music of the Final Fantasy series, which Uematsu agrees with. Inspired by The Rite of Spring by Igor Stravinsky to make a more "classical" track, and by rock and roll music from the late 1960s and early 1970s to make an orchestral track with a "destructive impact", he spent two weeks composing short unconnected musical phrases, and then arranged them together into "One-Winged Angel", an approach he had never used before.

Music from the game has been released in several albums. Square released the main soundtrack album, Final Fantasy VII Original Soundtrack, on four Compact Discs through its DigiCube subsidiary in 1997. A limited edition release was also produced, containing illustrated liner notes. The regular edition of the album reached third on the Japan Oricon charts, while the limited edition reached #19. Overall, the album had sold nearly 150,000 copies by January 2010. A single-disc album of selected tracks from the original soundtrack, along with three arranged pieces, titled Final Fantasy VII Reunion Tracks, was also released by DigiCube in 1997, reaching #20 on the Japan Oricon charts. A third album, Piano Collections Final Fantasy VII, was released by DigiCube in 2003, and contains one disc of piano arrangements of tracks from the game. It was arranged by Shirō Hamaguchi and performed by Seiji Honda, and reached #228 on the Oricon charts.

== Release ==
Final Fantasy VII was announced in February 1996. Square president and chief executive officer Tomoyuki Takechi were fairly confident about Japanese players making the game a commercial success despite it being on a new platform. A playable demo was included on a disc giveaway at the 1996 Tokyo Game Show, dubbed Square's Preview Extra: Final Fantasy VII & Siggraph '95 Works. The disc also included the early test footage Square created using characters from Final Fantasy VI. The initial release date was at some point in 1996, but to properly realize their vision, Square postponed the release date almost a full year. Final Fantasy VII was released on January 31, 1997. It was published in Japan by Square. A re-release of the game based on its Western version, titled Final Fantasy VII International, was released on October 2 the same year. This improved International version would kickstart the trend for Square to create an updated version for the Japanese release, based on the enhanced Western versions. The International version was re-released as a physical disc as part of the Final Fantasy 25th Anniversary Ultimate Box Japanese package on December 18, 2012.

While its success in Japan had been taken for granted by Square executives, North America and Europe were another matter, as up to that time the Japanese role-playing genre was still a niche market in Western territories. Sony, due to the PlayStation's struggles against Nintendo and Sega's home consoles, lobbied for the publishing rights in North America and Europe following Final Fantasy VII's transfer to PlayStation—to further persuade Square, Sony offered a lucrative royalties deal with profits potentially equaling those Square would get by self-publishing the game. Square accepted Sony's offer as Square itself lacked Western publishing experience. Square was uncertain about the game's success, as other JRPGs including Final Fantasy VI had met with poor sales outside Japan. To help with promoting the title overseas, Square dissolved their original Washington offices and hired new staff for fresh offices in Costa Mesa. It was first exhibited to the Western public at Electronic Entertainment Expo 1996 (E3).

To promote the game overseas, Square and Sony launched a widespread three-month advertising campaign in August 1997. Beginning with a television commercial that ran alongside popular shows such as Saturday Night Live and The Simpsons by TBWA\Chiat\Day, the campaign included numerous articles in both gaming and general interest magazines, advertisements in comics from publishers such as DC Comics and Marvel Comics, a special collaboration with Pepsi, media events, sample discs, and merchandise. According to estimations by Takechi, the total worldwide marketing budget came to US$40 million; $10 million had been spent in Japan, $10 million in Europe, and $20 million in North America. Unlike its predecessors, Final Fantasy VII did not have its numeral adjusted to account for the lack of a Western release for Final Fantasy II, III, and V — while only the fourth Final Fantasy released outside Japan, its Japanese title was retained. It was released in North America on September 7, 1997. The game was released in Europe on November 17, becoming the first Final Fantasy game to be released in Europe. The Western version included additional elements and alterations, such as streamlining of the menu and Materia system, reducing the health of enemies, new visual cues to help with navigation across the world map, and additional cutscenes relating to Cloud's past.

=== PC version ===
A version for PC was developed by Square's Costa Mesa offices. Square invested in a PC version to reach as wide a player base as possible; many Western consumers did not own a PlayStation, and Square's deal with Sony did not prohibit such a port. Having never released a title for PC, Square decided to treat the port as a sales experiment. The port was handled by a team of 15 to 20 people, mostly from Costa Mesa but with help from Tokyo. Square did not begin the port until the console version was finished. The team needed to rewrite an estimated 80% of the game's code, due to the need to unify what had been a custom build for a console written by multiple staff members. Consequently, programmers faced problems such as having to unify the original PlayStation version's five different game engines, leading to delays. The PC version came with a license for Yamaha Corporation's software synthesizer S-YXG70, allowing high-quality sequenced music despite varying sound hardware setups on different user computers. The conversion of the nearly 100 original musical pieces to XG format files was done by Yamaha.

To maximize their chances of success, Square searched for a Western company to assist with releasing the PC version. Eidos Interactive, whose release of Tomb Raider had turned them into a publishing giant, agreed to market and publish the port. The port was announced in December 1997, along with Eidos' exclusivity deal for North America and Europe at the time, though the port was rumored to happen as early as December 1996, prior to the PlayStation version's release. To help the product stand out in stores, Eidos chose a trapezoidal shape for the cover and box. They agreed on a contract price of $1.8 million, making initial sales forecasts of 100,000 units based on that outlay. The PC version was released in North America and Europe on June 25, 1998; the port was not released in Japan. Within one month, sales of the port exceeded the initial forecasts. The PC version would end up providing the source code for subsequent ports.

=== Localization ===
Localization of Final Fantasy VII was handled internally by Square. The English localization, led by Seth Luisi, was completed by a team of about fifty people and faced a variety of problems. According to Luisi, the biggest hurdle was making "the direct Japanese-to-English text translation read correctly in English. The sentence structure and grammar rules for the Japanese language is very different from English", making it difficult for the translation to read like native English without distorting the meaning. Michael Basket was the sole translator for the project, though he received the help of native Japanese speakers from the Tokyo office. The localization was taxing for the team due to their inexperience, lack of professional editors, and poor communication between the North American and Japanese offices. A result of this disconnect was the original localization of Aerith's name—which was intended as a conflation of "air" and "earth"—as "Aeris" due to a lack of communication between localization staff and the QA team.

The team also faced several technical issues due to programming practices which took little account of subsequent localization, such as dealing with a fixed-width font and having to insert kanji through language input keys to add special characters (for example, vowels with diacritics) to keep the code working. Consequently, the text was still read as Japanese by the word processor; the computer's spellcheck could not be used, and mistakes had to be caught manually. The code used obscure kanji to refer to main character's names, which made it unintuitive for the translators to identify characters. Translated text usually takes up more space than the Japanese text, though still had to fit to the screen appropriately without overusing page breaks (for example, item names, which are written in kanji in Japanese language, could overflow message windows in translated text); to mitigate this problem, a proportional typeface was implemented into the source code to fit more text into the screen. Swear words were used frequently in the localization to help convey the original Japanese meaning, though most profanities were censored in a manner described by Square employee Richard Honeywood as the "old comic book '@#$%!'-type replacement". The European release was described as being in a worse condition, as the translations into multiple European languages were outsourced by Sony to another company, further hindering communication. For the PC port, Square attempted to fix translation and grammar mistakes for the North American and European versions but did not have the time and budget to retranslate all the text. According to Honeywood, the success of Final Fantasy VII in the West encouraged Square to focus more on localization quality; on future games, Square hired additional translators and editors, while also streamlining communication between the development and localization teams.

Some months prior to the game's North American release, Sony publicly stated that it was considering cutting the scene at the Honey Bee Inn due to the salacious content, prompting numerous online petitions and letters of protest from RPG fans. Square subsequently stated that it would never allow Sony to localize the game in any way. In addition to translating the text, the North American localization team made tweaks to the gameplay, including reducing the enemy encounter rate, simplifying the Materia menu, and adding new boss fights.

=== Later releases ===
The International version of Final Fantasy VII was released on PlayStation Network (PSN) as a PSOne Classic in Japan on April 10, 2009. This version was compatible with both PlayStation 3 and PlayStation Portable with support for PlayStation Vita and PlayStation TV coming later. Final Fantasy VII was later released as a PSOne Classic in North America, Europe, and Australia on June 2. The PC version was updated by DotEmu for use on modern operating systems and released via Square Enix's North American and European online stores on August 14, 2012. It included high-resolution support, cloud saves, achievements, and a character booster. It would later be released via Steam on July 4, 2013, replacing the version available on Square Enix's North American and European online stores. The PC version would be released in Japan for the first time on May 16, 2013, exclusively via Square Enix's Japanese online store with the International version title. It has features unavailable in the western version including high-speed mode, no random encounters mode, and a max stats command. A release for iOS, based on the PC version and adjusted for mobile devices by D4 Enterprise, was released on August 19, 2015, with an auto-save feature. The PC version was released for PlayStation 4 on December 5, 2015. DotEmu developed the PS4 version, which included the E3 2015 reveal trailer for Final Fantasy VII Remake. The game was also released for Android on July 7, 2016, for the PlayStation Classic on December 3, 2018, and for the Nintendo Switch and Xbox One, also developed by DotEmu, worldwide on March 26, 2019.

== Reception ==
=== Commercial ===
Within three days of its release in Japan, Final Fantasy VII sold over two million copies. This popularity inspired thousands of retailers in North America to break street dates in September to meet public demand for the title. In the game's debut weekend in North America, it sold 330,000 copies, and had reached sales of 500,000 copies in less than three weeks. The momentum established in the game's opening weeks continued for several months; Sony announced the game had sold one million copies in North America by early December, prompting business analyst Edward Williams from Monness, Crespi, Hardt & Co. to comment that "Sony redefined the role-playing game (RPG) category and expanded the conventional audience with the launch of Final Fantasy VII". According to Weekly Famitsu, Final Fantasy VII sold 3.27 million units in Japan by the end of 1997.

By the end of 2005, the PlayStation version had sold 9.8 million copies including 4 million sales in Japan, making it the highest-selling game in the Final Fantasy series. By the end of 2006, The Best, the bargain reissue of the game, had sold over 158,000 copies in Japan. By May 2010, it had sold over 10 million copies worldwide, making it the most popular title in the series in terms of units sold. The original PC version surpassed Eidos' expectations: while initially forecast to sell 100,000 units, it quickly exceeded sales of one million units, garnering royalties of over $2 million for Square. By August 2015, the PlayStation and PC versions had sold over 11 million units worldwide. Steam Spy estimated the game to have sold over 1.2 million downloads on Steam as of April 2018, with a later Steam leak estimating it had 1.14 million players on the platform as of July 2018. As of June 2020, the game has sold more than 13.3 million units worldwide. As of September 2025, the original version of the game has sold over 15.3 million units worldwide.

=== Critical ===
Contemporary reviews

Review scores
| Publication | Score | |
| Publication | PC | PS |
|---|---|---|
| 1Up.com | N/A | A+ |
| AllGame | 4.5/5 | 5/5 |
| Computer Gaming World | 4/5 | N/A |
| Computer and Video Games | 9/10 | 5/5 |
| Edge | N/A | 9/10 |
| Electronic Gaming Monthly | N/A | 9.5/10, 9.5/10, 9.5/10, 9.5/10, |
| Famitsu | N/A | 10/10, 9/10, 10/10, 9/10 |
| Game Informer | N/A | 9.75/10 |
| GameFan | N/A | 300+/300 |
| GamePro | 4.5/5 | 20/20 |
| GameRevolution | N/A | B+ |
| GamesMaster | N/A | 96% |
| GameSpot | 8/10 | 9.5/10 |
| IGN | 8.2/10 | 9.5/10 |
| Next Generation | N/A | 5/5 |
| PlayStation Official Magazine – Australia | N/A | 10/10 |
| Official U.S. PlayStation Magazine | N/A | 5/5 |
| PC Format | 93% | N/A |
| PC Gamer (US) | 90% | N/A |
| PC PowerPlay | 90% | N/A |
| PC Zone | 93% | N/A |
| Play | N/A | 94% |
| PlayStation: The Official Magazine | N/A | 5/5 |
| Dengeki PlayStation | N/A | 100/100, 90/100, 85/100, 95/100 |

Retrospective reviews

Aggregate scores
| Aggregator | Score | |
| Aggregator | PC | PS |
|---|---|---|
| GameRankings | 86% | 92% |
| Metacritic | N/A | 92/100 |

Final Fantasy VII received universal acclaim from critics upon release, receiving perfect scores from 1Up.com, AllGame, Computer and Video Games, GameFan, GamePro, Next Generation, and official PlayStation magazines for Australia and the United States.

It was referred to by GameFan as "quite possibly the greatest game ever made", a quote selected for the back cover of the game's jewel case. GameSpot commented that "never before have technology, playability, and narrative combined as well as in Final Fantasy VII", expressing particular favor toward the game's graphics, audio, and story. The four reviewers of Electronic Gaming Monthly (EGM) unanimously gave it a 9.5 out of 10 and their "Game of the Month" award, lauding its rendered backgrounds, use of FMV, battles, and especially the story line, though they expressed disappointment that the ending did not resolve all of the loose ends. They also considered the North American localization a dramatic improvement over the original Japanese version. GamePro called the storytelling "dramatic, sentimental, and touching in a way that draws you into the characters", who "come alive thanks to sweetly subtle body movements". Both GamePro and Official U.S. PlayStation Magazine (OPM) said the ATB system gives battles a tension and urgency not usually seen in RPGs, and OPM called the summon animations "absolutely awe-inspiring". IGN's Jay Boor insisted the game's graphics were "light years beyond anything ever seen on the PlayStation", and regarded its battle system as its strongest point.

Computer and Video Games's Alex C praised the dramatic story and well-developed characters. In addition to calling the graphics "bar none the best the PlayStation has ever seen", Next Generation said of the story that "while FFVII may take a bit to get going, as in every entry in the series, moments of high melodrama are blended with scenes of sheer poetry and vision". Edge noted that Final Fantasy VII had come close to being an interactive movie in playable form, praising its combination of a complex story that went against Western graphic adventures trends and "excellently orchestrated chip music". RPGamer praised the game's soundtrack, both in variety and sheer volume, stating that "Uematsu has done his work exceptionally well" and saying that it was potentially his best work.

Final Fantasy VII has received some negative criticism. OPM and GameSpot questioned the game's linear progression. OPM considered the game's translation "a bit muddy". Similarly, RPGamer cited its translation as "packed with typos and other errors which further obscure what is already a very confusing plot". GamePro also considered the Japanese-to-English translation a significant weakness in the game, and IGN regarded the inability to use more than three characters at a time as "the game's only shortcoming".

Reviewers gave similar praise to the PC version but criticized its various technical faults. Computer Games Magazine said that no other recent game had the same "tendency to fail to work in any capacity on multiple [computers]". Computer Gaming World complained that the music quality suffered on PC sound cards, and Next Generation found the game's pre-rendered backgrounds significantly less impressive than those of the PlayStation version. However, the latter magazine found the higher-resolution battle visuals "absolutely stunning", and Computer Games Magazine said that they showed off the potential graphical power of PCs. All three magazines concluded by praising the game despite its technical flaws, and PC Gamer summarized that, while "Square apparently did only what was required to get its PlayStation game running under Windows", Final Fantasy VII is "still a winner on the PC".

=== Awards ===
Final Fantasy VII was given numerous Game of the Year awards in 1997. At the second CESA Awards, it won the Grand Prize, Scenario Award, and Sound Award. During the Academy of Interactive Arts & Sciences' inaugural Interactive Achievement Awards, Final Fantasy VII won in the categories of "Console Adventure Game of the Year" and "Console Role-Playing Game of the Year"; it also received nominations for "Interactive Title of the Year", "Console Game of the Year", "Outstanding Achievement in Art/Graphics", and "Outstanding Achievement in Interactive Design". In the Origins Awards, it won in the category "Best Roleplaying Computer Game of 1997". Final Fantasy VII was awarded Game of the Year by magazines including Game Informer, GamePro, and Hyper. It was also awarded the "Readers' Choice All Systems Game of the Year", "Readers' Choice PlayStation Game of the Year", and "Readers' Choice Role-Playing Game of the Year" by EGM, which gave it Editors' Choice Awards for "Role-Playing Game of the Year" and "Best Graphics" (plus a runner-up slot for "Game of the Year"), and also gave it awards for "Hottest Video Game Babe" (for Tifa Lockhart), "Most Hype for a Game", "Best Ending", and "Best Print Ad".

Since 1997, it has been selected by many game magazines as one of the top video games of all time, listed as 91st in EGM's 2001 "100 Best Games of All Time", and as fourth in Retro Gamer's "Top 100 Games" in 2004. In 2018, it was ranked 99th in IGN's "Top 100 Games of All Time" and as third in PALGN's "The Greatest 100 Games Ever". Final Fantasy VII was included in "The Greatest Games of All Time" list by GameSpot in 2006, and ranked as second in Empire's 2006 "100 Greatest Games of All Time", as third in Stuff's "100 Greatest Games" in 2008 and as 15th in Game Informer's 2009 "Top 200 Games of All Time" (down five places from its previous best games of all-time list). GameSpot placed it as the second most influential game ever made in 2002; in 2007, GamePro ranked it 14th on the list of the most important games of all time, and in 2009 it finished in the same place on their list of the most innovative games of all time. In 2012, Time named it one of their "All-Time 100 Video Games". In March 2018, Game Informer's "Readers Choice Top 300 Games of All Time", Final Fantasy VII ranked in seventh place. In March 2018, GamesRadar+ rated "The 25 best PS1 games of all time", Final Fantasy VII was ranked in 12th place.

It has also appeared in numerous other greatest game lists. In 2007, Dengeki PlayStation gave it the "Best Story", "Best RPG", and "Best Overall Game" retrospective awards for games on the original PlayStation. The same year, Play magazine ranked it first place on its list of top 25 best role-playing games of all time. GamePro named it the best RPG title of all time in 2008, and featured it in their 2010 article "The 30 Best PSN Games". In 2012, GamesRadar also ranked it as the sixth saddest game ever. On the other hand, GameSpy ranked it seventh on their 2003 list of the most overrated games.

Final Fantasy VII has often placed at or near the top of many reader polls of all-time best games. It was voted the "Reader's Choice Game of the Century" in an IGN poll in 2000, and placed second in the "Top 100 Favorite Games of All Time" by Japanese magazine Famitsu in 2006 (it was also voted as ninth in Famitsu's 2011 poll of most tear-inducing games of all time). Users of GameFAQs voted it the "Best Game Ever" in 2004 and in 2005, and placed it second in 2009. In 2008, readers of Dengeki magazine voted it the best game ever made, as well as the ninth most tear-inducing game of all time.

== Legacy ==
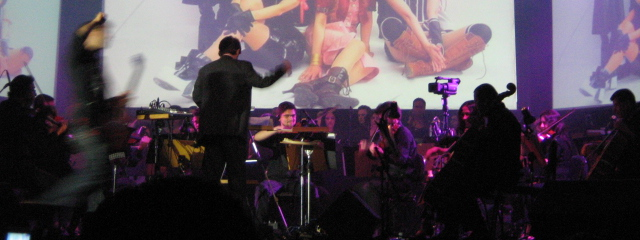
Music from the game's soundtrack is often performed live in symphonic concerts, such as the Video Games Live event in 2009.

The game inspired an unofficial version for the NES by Chinese company Shenzhen Nanjing Technology. This port features the Final Fantasy VII game scaled back to 2D, with some of the side quests removed. The game also inspired a LittleBigPlanet fan remake by Jamie Colliver. Colliver's adaptation reimagines the entire original game as a platformer and was awarded two Guinness World Records in 2014, for the first complete Final Fantasy remake made in another video game and the first role-playing game remade in LittleBigPlanet.

The game's popularity and open-ended nature also led director Kitase and scenario writer Nojima to establish a plot-related connection between Final Fantasy VII and Final Fantasy X-2 (2003). The character Shinra from X-2 proposes the concept of extracting the life energy from within the planet Spira. Nojima has stated that Shinra and his proposal are a deliberate nod to the Shinra Company and that he envisioned the events of Final Fantasy X-2 as a prequel to those in VII. The advances in technology used to create the FMV sequences and computer graphics for Final Fantasy VII allowed Sakaguchi to begin production on the first Final Fantasy film, Final Fantasy: The Spirits Within (2001). The game introduced a particular aesthetic to the series—fantasy suffused with modern-to-advanced technology—which was explored further in Final Fantasy VIII (1999), The Spirits Within, and XV (2016). Re-releases of Square games in Japan with bonus features would occur frequently after the release of Final Fantasy VII International. Later titles that would be re-released as international versions include Final Fantasy X and other follow-ups from the franchise, as well as the Kingdom Hearts series.

Final Fantasy VII is credited as having the largest impact of the Final Fantasy series, and with allowing console role-playing games to gain mass-market appeal outside of Japan. Aerith's death in the game has often been referred to as one of the most significant moments from any video game. In addition, Final Fantasy VII is also noted for its use of the unreliable narrator literary concept, drawing comparisons to films such as Fight Club (1999), The Sixth Sense (1999), American Psycho (2000), and Memento (2000). Patrick Holleman and Jeremy Parish argue that the game takes the unreliable narrator concept a step further, with its interactivity establishing a connection between the player and the protagonist Cloud, setting Final Fantasy VII apart from films as well as other video games. According to Holleman, "no RPG has ever deliberately betrayed the connection between protagonist and player like FFVII does". Harry Mackin writing for Paste called the game "a subversion that deconstructs and comments meaningfully on how we think about heroism, masculinity, and identity, in videogame storytelling". Ric Manning of The Courier-Journal noted elements of psychoanalysis in the game. The game is also noted for its cyberpunk themes; GamesRadar+ called it one of the best games of the genre, and Paste compared its cyberpunk city of Midgar to Akira and Blade Runner. According to Comic Book Resources, the game's climate change theme is more meaningful in 2019 than it was in 1997.

Several characters from Final Fantasy VII have made cameo appearances in other Square Enix titles, most notably the fighting game Ehrgeiz (1998) and the popular Final-Fantasy-to-Disney crossover series Kingdom Hearts. Additionally, fighting video game Dissidia Final Fantasy (2008) includes Final Fantasy VII characters such as Cloud and Sephiroth, and allows players to fight with characters from throughout the Final Fantasy series, and its follow-up, Dissidia 012 (2011), included Tifa as well. Cloud is also a playable character in Final Fantasy Tactics. In December 2015, Cloud was released as a downloadable content character for the Nintendo crossover fighting game Super Smash Bros. for Nintendo 3DS and Wii U (2014), along with a stage based on Midgar. He returned in the 2018 sequel, Super Smash Bros. Ultimate, with Sephiroth being added as downloadable content in December 2020.

=== Related media and merchandise ===
The world of Final Fantasy VII is explored further in the Compilation of Final Fantasy VII, a series of games, animated features, and short stories. The first title in the Compilation is the mobile game Before Crisis, a prequel focusing on the Turks' activities six years before the original game. The CGI film sequel Advent Children, set two years after the game, was the first title announced but the second to be released. Special DVD editions of the film included Last Order, an original video animation that recounts the destruction of Nibelheim. Dirge of Cerberus and its mobile phone counterpart, Dirge of Cerberus Lost Episode: Final Fantasy VII, are third-person shooters set one year after Advent Children. Dirge focuses on the backstory of Vincent Valentine, whose history was left mostly untold in Final Fantasy VII. The most recent title is the PlayStation Portable game Crisis Core, an action role-playing game that centers on Zack's past.

Releases not under the Compilation label include Maiden Who Travels the Planet, which follows Aerith's journey in the Lifestream after her death, taking place concurrently with the second half of the original game. In 1998, the Official Final Fantasy VII Strategy Guide was licensed by SquareSoft and published by Brady Games. Final Fantasy VII Snowboarding is a mobile port of the snowboard minigame featured in the original game, featuring different courses for the player to tackle. The game is downloadable on V Cast-compatible mobile phones and was first made available on March 15, 2005 in North America and in Japan on November 10, 2008.

Final Fantasy VII G-Bike is a mobile game released for iOS and Android in December 2014, based on the motorbike minigame featured in the original game. In September 2007, Square Enix published Final Fantasy VII 10th Anniversary Ultimania. This book is an in-depth compilation of FFVII story-line and artwork. In 2018, Universal Studios Japan opened a Final Fantasy VII–themed virtual reality attraction.

=== Remakes ===
With the announcement and development of the Compilation of Final Fantasy VII, speculation spread that a remake of the original Final Fantasy VII would be released for the PlayStation 3. This conjecture was sparked by the release of a video featuring the opening sequence of FFVII recreated using the PlayStation 3's graphical capabilities at E3 2005. After a decade of speculation, a remake was announced at E3 2015. The game saw changes made to its story and combat system. The game is planned to be released over three installments, with the first part being released for the PlayStation 4 in April 2020. The follow-up, Final Fantasy VII Rebirth, was released for PlayStation 5 in February 2024. Final Fantasy VII Revelation is currently in development for Nintendo Switch 2, PlayStation 5, Windows, and Xbox Series X/S. Crisis Core: Final Fantasy VII Reunion, a remaster of Crisis Core: Final Fantasy VII, which was released in December 2022, is also considered a prequel to the larger Final Fantasy VII Remake project.
