= Cait Sith (Final Fantasy) =

- Final Fantasy character
- Cait Sith artwork by Tetsuya Nomura for Final Fantasy VII
- First game: Final Fantasy VII (1997)
- Created by: Tetsuya Nomura
- Designed by: Tetsuya Nomura; Masaaki Kazeno (Remake); Roberto Ferrari (Reeve, Remake)
- Voiced by: English: Greg Ellis (Advent Children and Dirge of Cerberus); Paul Tinto (Rebirth); Jamieson Price (Reeve, Advent Children and Dirge of Cerberus); Jon Root (Reeve, Remake and Rebirth); Japanese: Hideo Ishikawa; Banjō Ginga (Reeve)

In-universe information
- Weapon: Megaphone

Cait Sith (ケット・シー, Ketto Shī; /keɪt sɪð/ in English, /kæt ʃiː/ in Japanese) is a character in the 1997 role-playing video game Final Fantasy VII developed by Square. He reappeared in Final Fantasy VII Remake and Final Fantasy VII Rebirth, developed and published by Square Enix. Taking its name from the Scottish mythology fairy Cat-sìth, he is a fortune-telling robot that initially joins the group to act as a spy for the Shinra Electric Power Company, controlled remotely by their employee Reeve Tuesti (リーブ・トゥエスティ, Rību Tuesuti). After his betrayal is revealed, he joins the protagonists fully to help stop an impending disaster to the planet. In English Cait Sith is voiced by Greg Ellis and Paul Tinto, while in Japanese he is voiced by Hideo Ishikawa. Reeve meanwhile is voiced by Jamieson Price and Jon Root in English, and Banjô Ginga in Japanese.

== Conception and creation ==
Named after the Scottish mythology fairy Cat-sìth, Cait Sith was designed by lead Tetsuya Nomura to be two characters combined into one, a concept he wanted to include since the beginning of development. Designed as a small anthropomorphic cat resembling the fictional character Puss in Boots but with a crown, Cait Sith uses a megaphone to control the other half of his body, with the effectiveness of his control determined by the quality of his megaphone. During development Nomura was conflicted with using either a fat moogle or fat chocobo, two recurring creature types in the Final Fantasy series, for Cait Sith's other half. He chose the former, with Cait Sith riding atop its shoulders while it walked by hopping and skipping along. Nomura stated in an interview with Young Jump that characters like Cait came about from a desire to develop unique characters for the game due to it being his first full project and his own nervousness, and at the time such character concepts would normally be considered "unreasonable".

Cait Sith was intended to speak with a Kansai Japanese dialect, and they brought a specialist to assist with writing his dialogue properly. This was done to give his dialogue a "humorous" feel, even in the most serious scenes. However, when the game was released players remarked that his dialogue did not fit the dialect, so the development team instead called it "a Cait Sith dialect". Meanwhile, as of Advent Children, a film sequel to the original game, he speaks with a Scottish accent in English localizations.

Originally, it was planned to have the character to be able to capture monsters, and fight using a whip and throwing cards. In the final game he has a Limit Break attack usable after taking or dealing enough damage during the course of battles, where a slot machine will appear on the screen. Depending on the outcome, one of several various effects will occur, including either instantly defeating all present enemies, or with the player's party instantly defeated instead. For Final Fantasy VII Rebirth, part of a series of titles serving as a remaking of the original game, battle director Teruki Endo had a difficult time developing his gameplay aspect. Believing there were two approaches to gameplay archetypes, "standard" and "oddball", he went with the latter due to Cait Sith's appearance while tweaking it up until the final stages of develop to ensure "it didn't have too many quirks".

=== Design ===
In a change from previous entries in the Final Fantasy series, the development team worked off of Nomura's character designs directly. Standing 100 centimetres (3 ft 3 1/2 in) tall, Cait Sith resembles a bipedal tuxedo cat with gray fur, having a white belly, tail tip, paws, and a patch in an upward-pointing triangle pattern on his face. His outfit consists of a pair of boots, white gloves, a red cape, and a crown atop his head, while his eyes are always in a closed state. The other half of its body is a large fat moogle, and while its height is not stated it stands significantly taller and wider than Cait Sith. It appears as a rotound, white bipedal furry creature, which two bat wings protruding from its back and a wide mouth with two tusks protruding from its lower jaw. Reeve meanwhile stands 180 cm (5 ft 11 in) tall, and has long black hair slicked back and a trimmed beard, wearing a blue suit with a red tie.

The character model was reimagined by Masaaki Kazeno for Final Fantasy VII Remake. Kazeno aimed for cuteness in his design and unveiled it at a meeting during Remake's development, only to be surprised when he was informed Cait Sith was not going to be a playable character until the next title, Final Fantasy VII Rebirth. His height was shortened as of Rebirth, now standing 80 cm (2 ft 8 in) tall. Reeve meanwhile was redesigned by artist Roberto Ferrari for the games, given a black pinstripe suit, which Ferrari felt made him look "suave".

== Appearances ==
Cait Sith is a robotic talking cat. In Final Fantasy VII, he rides atop an unnamed robotic Moogle; in later installments in the Compilation of Final Fantasy VII, he either walks by himself or rides Red XIII. As a robot, he can be rebuilt and replaced and is controlled by Reeve Tuesti, whose original intent during Final Fantasy VII was to infiltrate Cloud's group and sabotage their resistance efforts on behalf of his Shinra employers. After having a change of heart, he decides to help the group, even risking his life by destroying a version of himself to extract the Black Materia Sephiroth needs to summon the Meteor spell. He appears briefly in Advent Children and Final Fantasy VII Remake and as a briefly playable character throughout Dirge of Cerberus.

Cait Sith is voiced in English by Greg Ellis in Advent Children and Dirge of Cerberus and by Paul Tinto in Final Fantasy VII Rebirth, while Hideo Ishikawa voices him in Japanese. Reeve is voiced in English by Jamieson Price in Advent Children and Dirge of Cerberus and by Jon Root in Final Fantasy VII Remake, Banjō Ginga provides his voice in Japanese.

== Promotion and reception ==
C.J. Andriessen of Destructoid expressed a heavy disdain for the character, stating that while he initially assumed Cait Sith would be one of his favorites in Final Fantasy VII due to his design and choice of weapon, his perspective was soured quickly by the double-cross. While he acknowledged the character sacrifices himself later on in the game's story, the betrayal caused him to develop a particular grudge for Cait Sith that lasted well after he had completed the game. Scott Baird of Gamepur shared similar sentiments towards the character's betrayal, but also criticized his design, stating he felt it was out of place and "stands out like the custom character in a cutscene every time he shows up." He further expressed that Cait Sith was not as entertaining as the other characters in VII, and found the decision to give him a Scottish accent in later entries related to VII to be "baffling" and "annoying", though felt he was spared of being the worst character in those games due to his limited usage compared to other equally disliked characters.

James Stephanie Sterling in her own article for Destructoid on the other hand defended the character, stating that "his character arc was perhaps the most resonant". She further called Reeve a representation of most modern people and a good example of the regular salaryman in a business trying to do good for others despite his company constantly doing harm. Sterling further emphasized that while Cait Sith was Reeve's puppet, he was a puppet himself through the game for Shinra's higher ups and their own ambitions, until he rebels and earned his redemption by standing up to them. She cited Cait Sith as an example of a reformed villain, a character archetype she felt many enjoyed, and pointed out that through much of the story he didn't have a choice in his actions, and quickly attempts to make amends afterward.

Sterling went further in her examination of the character, and stated that she was confused by the criticism towards Cait Sith's design. Sterling hadn't seen him as "annoying" or "trying to be a 'cool' mascot-type character" as seen in other games, but instead something that felt true to older Final Fantasy design in its levity, an element Sterling pointed out later games in the series emphasized and were celebrated for. Cait Sith to her had a "memorable, distinctive and comical look, something that was needed to offset the darker, rather po-faced appearance of the rest of the cast", and his humorous appearance helped offset how the rest of the party was shown as "brooding and containing their androgynous rage". This sentiment was shared by Zachari Greif of Game Rant, who called Cait Sith the "party's backbone", particularly in Rebirth. He pointed out that while the player was likely aware of his impending betrayal given the original game, the development team emphasized his cuter aspects. This helped to portray him as someone "there to bring smiles and lift the team up", often looking out for them and helping as needed, and further punctuated by the sacrifice of one of his bodies to ensure the party's safe escape from the Temple of Ancients.

Patrick Holleman in his book Reverse Design: Final Fantasy VII compared Cait Sith's relation to the rest of the group to a straight man in a comedy group, in that he provides contrast to the rest of the group and their survivor status. He felt that this was a deliberate choice as it helped solidify the group and what they had in common. He also felt it was necessary to not separate Reeve from him as a character, noting that while his manner of speaking was different from when he was in control of Cait Sith, he still had a vested interest in helping the party. He also emphasized how his role in Shinra as a company diminishes during the course of the game until he is removed entirely, and stated that while Reeve didn't share the same connection to the past motivating him as he does the other characters, he shared another in how he outlived the context that gave him an identity.
