= Aerith Gainsborough =

Character in Final Fantasy VII

- Final Fantasy character
- Aerith Gainsborough artwork by Tetsuya Nomura for Final Fantasy VII
- First game: Final Fantasy VII (1997)
- Created by: Yoshinori Kitase; Hironobu Sakaguchi
- Designed by: Tetsuya Nomura
- Voiced by: English: Mandy Moore (Kingdom Hearts); Mena Suvari (Kingdom Hearts II and Advent Children); Andrea Bowen (2008–2020); Briana White (2020–present); Capri Oliver (Remake and Rebirth, young); Japanese: Maaya Sakamoto; Chihiro Tanaka (Remake, young)

In-universe information
- Race: Cetra-Human Hybrid
- Weapon: Staff

Aerith Gainsborough (Japanese: エアリス・ゲインズブール, Hepburn: Earisu Geinzubūru) is a character from the 1997 role-playing video game Final Fantasy VII by Square (now Square Enix). She has also appeared in the Compilation of Final Fantasy VII, the wider Final Fantasy series, and the Kingdom Hearts series by Square Enix and The Walt Disney Company. She was designed by Tetsuya Nomura with influence from Yoshinori Kitase, Hironobu Sakaguchi and Yoshitaka Amano.

Aerith is a young woman allied with the eco-terrorist organization AVALANCHE. During the group's pursuit of the game's antagonist Sephiroth, it is revealed that Aerith is the last surviving Cetra, or "Ancient", one of the planet's oldest races. She is ultimately murdered by Sephiroth. Aerith has been met with generally positive reception, and her unexpected death is considered to be one of the most memorable scenes in the series.

== Concept and design ==
Aerith was designed by Tetsuya Nomura, who based her on an earlier design of Lemure from Final Fantasy V, with influence from director and scenario writer Yoshinori Kitase and Hironobu Sakaguchi, while Yoshitaka Amano created conceptual artwork for her design. She has green eyes and long light ash brown hair tied in a braid with a pink ribbon. She wears a long pink dress, a bolero jacket, and brown hiking boots. The long dress was designed to appear ladylike and contrast with the miniskirt worn by Tifa Lockhart. During development, Aerith was supposed to be Sephiroth's sister, as their designs resembled each other. However, they were made former lovers, with Aerith remembering Sephiroth when meeting Cloud as both are ex-SOLDIERS. Late during development, Aerith's first love was changed to Zack Fair.

Aerith is a white mage, a recurring Final Fantasy class, who uses magic spells to heal her allies in combat. Her green eyes are meant to symbolize nature and contrast with Tifa's red eyes. Nomura did not change much of Aerith's design for Advent Children, but her design was updated in Kingdom Hearts with the removal of her bolero jacket, which made her attire resemble how Amano had originally drawn her. Other changes included the addition of bracelets and a belt. Nomura modified her dress in Before Crisis, adding white and green colors; this version was also used as the basis for her design in Kingdom Hearts II.

Aerith's original Japanese name is Earisu (エアリス) pronounced [eaɾisɯ]. This was transliterated to "Aeris" in Final Fantasy VII and Final Fantasy Tactics and "Aerith" in later products. However, official Japanese material uses the spelling "Aerith", and developers stated that "Aerith" is a near-anagram of "Earth".

In Final Fantasy VII, Aerith was to be one of only three protagonists alongside Cloud and Barret Wallace. During a phone call to Kitase, it was suggested that at some point in the game, one of the main characters should die, and after much discussion as to whether it should be Barret or Aerith, the producers chose Aerith. Nomura stated in a 2005 Electronic Gaming Monthly interview: "Cloud's the main character, so you can't really kill him. And Barrett... [sic] well, that's maybe too obvious". While designing Final Fantasy VII, Nomura was frustrated with the "perennial cliché where the protagonist loves someone very much and so has to sacrifice himself and die in a dramatic fashion to express that love". He found this trope appeared in both films and video games from North America and Japan, and asked "Is it right to set such an example to people?" Kitase concluded: "In the real world things are very different. You just need to look around you. Nobody wants to die that way. People die of disease and accident. Death comes suddenly and there is no notion of good or bad. It leaves, not a dramatic feeling but great emptiness. When you lose someone you feel this big empty space and think, 'If I had known this was coming I would have done things differently'. These are the feelings I wanted to arouse in the players with Aerith's death relatively early in the game. Feelings of reality and not Hollywood".

According to Nomura, "death should be something sudden and unexpected, and Aerith's death seemed more natural and realistic". He said: "When I reflect on Final Fantasy VII, the fact that fans were so offended by her sudden death probably means that we were successful with her character. If fans had simply accepted her death, that would have meant she wasn't an effective character". From the original release of the game, rumors have circulated that Aerith can be resurrected in or that the original plan was to have her come back, but this was scrapped in development. Nomura has categorically stated that neither of these rumors were ever true, as he said that "the world was expecting us to bring her back to life, as this is the classic convention". A lengthy petition asking for Aerith's revival by Japanese players was sent to Kitase, but he dismissed it, pointing out that "there are many meanings in Aerith's death and [her revival] could never happen". Mena Suvari explained that for Advent Children, Aerith was given a motherly feel with an ephemeral presence, and expressed joy for her role.

For Final Fantasy VII Remake, voice actress Briana White studied the acting of Maaya Sakamoto, the Japanese voice of Aerith, to appeal to fans for the English performance of the role.

=== Voice actresses ===
Aerith is voiced in Japanese by Maaya Sakamoto. In English, she is voiced by Mandy Moore in Kingdom Hearts; Mena Suvari in Kingdom Hearts II and Final Fantasy VII Advent Children, Andrea Bowen in Crisis Core: Final Fantasy VII and the Re Mind DLC of Kingdom Hearts III; and Briana White in Final Fantasy VII Remake, Crisis Core: Final Fantasy VII Reunion, and Final Fantasy VII Rebirth.

== Musical theme ==
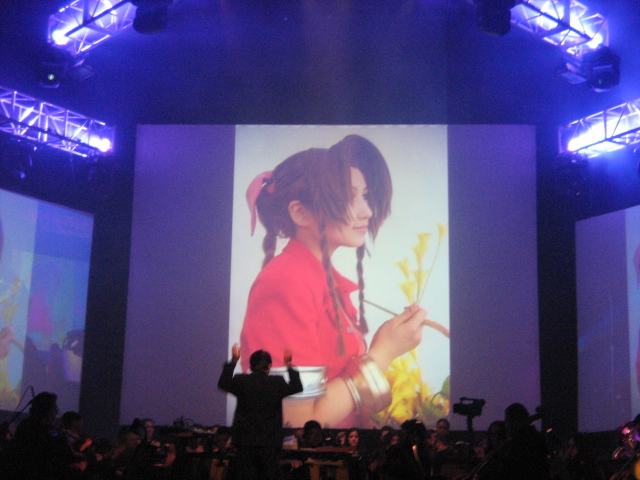
VGL performance in 2009

Aerith's Theme
The orchestral arrangement of "Aerith's Theme"

"Aerith's Theme", a leitmotif associated with Aerith and written by Final Fantasy composer Nobuo Uematsu, is used several times throughout Final Fantasy VII. It is first heard during the flashback scenes with Aerith's mother at her house and also plays as she is killed by Sephiroth. The piece "Flowers Blooming in the Church" is based on the theme.

"Aerith's Theme" is popular among Final Fantasy fans and has inspired orchestral and piano versions, as well as a vocal rendition performed by the artist Rikki, who also sang "Suteki Da Ne" for Final Fantasy X. A piano arrangement of the theme appears twice in Advent Children; the opening phrase of "Aerith's Theme" appears prior to the climax of the track "Divinity II", whose final line is the Latin phrase "Sola Dea fatum novit" ("Only the goddess knows fate"), and it is also featured during the end credits of the film. The theme also shares similarities with the track "Water". It has been reinterpreted on the OverClocked ReMix Final Fantasy VII compilation Voices of the Lifestream. In 2013, "Aerith's Theme" was voted third place in the Classic FM Hall of Fame poll for classical music.

== Appearances ==
=== Final Fantasy VII ===
Aerith Gainsborough is first introduced as a florist who briefly converses with Cloud Strife, a mercenary working for the eco-terrorist group AVALANCHE, as he flees the group's bombing of a Mako reactor. The two later meet in Aerith's church in the Sector 5 slums, where the Turks attempt to capture her. Aerith asks Cloud to be her bodyguard, offering a date in return. She is eventually apprehended but ultimately rescued by Cloud and his allies. Aerith then joins them in the pursuit of Sephiroth, while also embarking on her own journey of self-discovery.

After a failed attempt to foil Sephiroth's theft of the Black Materia, Aerith ventures alone into the Forgotten City. Cloud and his companions pursue her and eventually find her praying at an altar. As Aerith looks up to smile at Cloud, Sephiroth appears and kills her by impaling her through the torso. Cloud carries Aerith's body out into a lake in the Forgotten City and releases her back to the Planet. Reeve Tuesti, the head of Shinra Urban and Development, brings the news of her death to Elmyra Gainsborough, Aerith's adoptive mother. The party later learns why Aerith was in the Forgotten City; through her White Materia, Aerith was able to summon Holy, the only force capable of repelling the ultimate destructive magic, Meteor, which Sephiroth has summoned. Although Aerith successfully casts Holy before her death, the spell is held back by the power of Sephiroth's will. When Sephiroth is finally defeated and Holy is released, it appears that it is too late to function effectively, as Meteor is approaching the Planet's surface. While Holy clashes with Meteor and attempts to prevent its impact, the gravity of both Meteor and the Planet, pulling on Holy in opposite directions, weakens it. Aerith is seen praying whilst urging the Lifestream to defend the planet. The Planet's Lifestream then flows forth, intervening between Holy and Meteor and aiding in the destruction of Meteor.

=== Compilation of Final Fantasy VII ===
In Before Crisis, which is set several years prior to the events of Final Fantasy VII, Aerith becomes the target of the original incarnation of AVALANCHE, led by Elfé, who seek to prevent Shinra from acquiring the last surviving Cetra. Instead, AVALANCHE intend to use her to learn the whereabouts of the Promised Land for their own purposes, although a member of the Turks tries to protect her.

Aerith makes a few appearances in the CGI film Advent Children as a hallucination in Cloud's mind, urging him to move on with his life and forgive himself for the tragedies that were beyond his control. During one such introspection, Cloud imagines Aerith speaking to him in an open meadow laden with flowers, poking fun at how he needlessly burdens himself with the past. One of Aerith's interactions with Cloud comes when each member of the original game's party helps in Cloud's final attack against Bahamut SIN; he imagines she appears as the last party member to assist him. When Cloud hangs between life and death after his battle with Sephiroth, her and Zack Fair can be heard referring to Cloud as a child "too big to adopt" before returning him to the living world. She appears again in the final scene of the film, along with Zack Fair, where she gives Cloud more words of encouragement before she and Zack walk into the light. Near the end of the film, it is discovered that water mixed with the Lifestream flows beneath the flowerbed in Aerith's church, which manifests as a cure for a disease called Geostigma.

The On the Way to a Smile novella "Case of the Lifestream – Black & White" focuses on Aerith and Sephiroth's respective journeys through the Lifestream after the end of the game but before the events of the film. The "Black" section deals with Sephiroth, and the "White" with Aerith.

Aerith appears in the prequel game Crisis Core, where she is 16 years old. She meets Zack, whom she falls in love with during his stay in Midgar. Aerith and Zack develop a romantic relationship, but Zack is killed after escaping from being held in a Mako chamber for four years in the Shinra Mansion basement and defending Cloud from Shinra soldiers. During those years, Aerith helped her adopted mother earn a living by growing and selling flowers, a job that results in her meeting Cloud at the beginning of Final Fantasy VII.

Aerith is featured prominently in Final Fantasy VII Remake, which covers the Midgar portion of the original game. Unlike in the original localization, the remake gives her name as the more widely accepted Aerith rather than Aeris.

=== Other appearances ===
Aerith's character has appeared in several games outside of the Final Fantasy VII continuity. In Final Fantasy Tactics, she appears as a flower girl; when a group of criminals harasses her, Cloud appears and the player engages in battle with the group, letting her escape. Itadaki Street Special features a playable version of Aerith, as well as other Final Fantasy VII characters Tifa Lockhart, Cloud Strife, and Sephiroth. She also appears in Itadaki Street Portable with the same characters from Special, with the addition of Yuffie Kisaragi. Aerith appears in the fighting game Dissidia 012 Final Fantasy as an assistant character. She is also featured in the rhythm game Theatrhythm Final Fantasy as a sub-character representing Final Fantasy VII. In LittleBigPlanet 2, Aerith is featured as a downloadable character model. Aerith also appears as a Mii costume and Spirit in Super Smash Bros. Ultimate.

Aerith appears in the Kingdom Hearts series as a member of a group dedicated to defeating the Heartless, which includes fellow Final Fantasy VII characters Yuffie Kisaragi and Cid Highwind, and Leon of Final Fantasy VIII. In the plot of Kingdom Hearts, Aerith suggests a method for defeating the Heartless to protagonists Donald Duck, Goofy and Sora, and gives advice to the player throughout the game. She also appears in Kingdom Hearts: Chain of Memories as a figment of Sora's memories. Aerith returns in Kingdom Hearts II, wearing a modified version of her dress from Before Crisis. She, Leon, Cid and Yuffie run a restoration committee for the town of Hollow Bastion. Aerith and the restoration committee return in the Kingdom Hearts III Re Mind expansion, helping Riku search for the missing Sora.

Hoshi o Meguru Otome, a novella written by Benny Matsuyama which appears in the Final Fantasy VII Ultimania Ω guide, follows Aerith's journey through the Lifestream following her death in Final Fantasy VII. Aerith is referenced in a graffiti depicted in Wreck-It Ralph, which reads "Aerith Lives".

== Reception ==
Aerith has received an overall positive reception from critics. GamesTM referred to her as a "gaming legend". RPGamer's Stuart Hoggan opined that although Aerith "represented the token damsel in distress", she "broke the mould in terms of personality", possessing "an admirable pluck that was not brassy nor off-putting". In a This American Life episode, titled "Save the Girl", reporter Lina Misitzis described the character as one-dimensional and lacking in personality. She and Kotaku writer Mike Fahey conclude that had the character been anything other than a pretty girl, she would have needed much more development in order to elicit an emotional response from the player. Alana Hagues of RPGFan was bothered by the game's initial characterization of Aerith as a damsel in distress, but she praised the contrast of her dealing with personal struggles, including the death of her boyfriend Zack and being the last Cetra, with remaining strong enough to appreciate life and lift the mood of the party. Aerith's romantic relationship with Cloud was also praised, though some sites noted there were arguments between fans about whether or not Tifa was more suitable to be Cloud's love interest. In a retrospective, Polygon analyzed several fan arguments about Cloud's preferred partner and how each side misrepresents the other's chosen heroine. Polygon concludes that there is no winning couple as, after killing Sephiroth, Cloud has a vision of Aerith when Tifa tries to help him and the duo agrees to meet her again. In contrast to this, Aerith's relationship with Zack Fair was noted to be more impactful based on her role in Crisis Core.

Aerith's death scene in Final Fantasy VII is considered iconic by players and critics.

Aerith's death in Final Fantasy VII has received a great deal of attention. Tom's Games called the scene "one of the most powerful and memorable scenes of the Final Fantasy series—or any other game, for that matter". The game's incorporation of computer-animated cutscenes, the first in the series to do so, allowed the use of cinematic techniques to magnify players' emotional connection with the scene. Edge called her death the "dramatic highpoint" of Final Fantasy VII, and suggested that reintroducing her through the Compilation of Final Fantasy VII titles "arguably undermines this great moment". Her death has also been cited as the defining moment of a star-crossed love story between her and main character Cloud Strife. Benjamin Banasik from Heidelberg University noted that the impact of Aerith's death is mostly seen in Cloud's characterization in Advent Children as he seeks redemption for her, leading him to his transformation into a heroic leader in the process. Her death has been described as a disastrous and traumatic reminder of the eventual war.

According to GamesTM, Aerith's death helped establish the popularity of Final Fantasy VII. Players commented on message boards and blogs about the emotional impact the scene held, and fans submitted a petition to Yoshinori Kitase requesting her return. Brian Taylor, writing for Kill Screen, described a cottage industry of fan theories for how to return Aerith to life or prevent her death, comparing these efforts to the letter-writing campaign to convince Charles Dickens not to let Nell, the endearing protagonist of The Old Curiosity Shop, die at the end of the book. Taylor affirmed that the acts of discussing these fan theories and dissecting the game code to test them comprise a valid and important part of the game experience. In A Feeling of Wrongness: Pessimistic Rhetoric on the Fringes of Popular Culture, Aerith is seen a highly developed character, citing Cloud's visits to her mother and how often the protagonist and the heroine talk. As Aerith plays a more active role in combat, her death is also noted to affect the gamer, as a result of the loss of her usefulness and her healing abilities.

Siliconera praised the humanization of Aerith's character in Remake, feeling that the original game depicted Aerith as "an idealized character on a pedestal". The Escapist stated that while the player primarily controls Cloud, Aerith remains the actual hero of the game, causing players to wonder if it was possible to save her. Game journalist Mike Fahey expressed concern for the repeat of Aerith's death in the Remake chronology, as he considered her to be the least developed heroine in the original game. A paper presented at the International Association for the Fantastic in the Arts highlights Remake's use of the player's knowledge of Aerith's death, as it poses the decision of repeating the original game's narrative or defying fate in "boundless, terrifying freedom", as said by Aerith. A paper published by the Digital Games Research Association notes the scene where a specter of Aerith warns Cloud not to fall in love with her, "as if Square Enix is reacting to the player's constricted conditions, potential desires, and narrative expectations". Digital Trend describes Aerith's impending death in the Remake chronology as fuel for "an emotional, character-driven story about heroes overcoming self-doubt to fight for a better future", allowing Cloud's heroism in his efforts to save Aerith to overshadow his failure to do so.

== See also ==
- List of Final Fantasy VII characters
