= Development of Final Fantasy XV =

The development of Final Fantasy XV, a Japanese action role-playing video game, began in 2006 shortly before its announcement at that year's Electronic Entertainment Expo. Square Enix handled primary development, and the game was released worldwide in November 2016 for PlayStation 4 and Xbox One. The game was originally announced as Final Fantasy Versus XIII, a PlayStation 3-exclusive spin-off title. It was part of Fabula Nova Crystallis Final Fantasy, a subseries of games linked by a common mythos: while retaining thematic links, specific references were removed to aid with marketing. The game was originally directed by Tetsuya Nomura, who also created the story concept and main character designs. Nomura wanted to create a darker Final Fantasy title unsuitable for the main series. The initial development went slowly, and by 2007 the scale of the project generated discussions about rebranding the game as the next main entry in the series. Production on Versus XIII ended in 2012, when it was rebranded as Final Fantasy XV and transferred onto eighth-generation gaming hardware consoles.

After changing platforms, a production team headed by Hajime Tabata was brought on board to aid development. Tabata became co-director, and was eventually promoted to sole director after Nomura was transferred to work on other projects within the company. After the transition to eighth-generation hardware, multiple changes were made so that it better suited the new consoles and its new status as a mainline game: these included radical staff reshuffles, and the reevaluation of the game's content. The latter part resulted in some scenes and characters from Versus XIII being cut. Later in production, multiple other studios were brought in to help with various aspects of the game. Originally built using the company's proprietary Crystal Tools game engine, after the platform change it shifted to Luminous Engine, which was designed for next-generation platforms. Across both versions, development of Final Fantasy XV lasted ten years.

Since its original announcement, release of information became sporadic, leading to video game journalists labeling it as vaporware and eventually to rumors of its cancellation. After its public rebranding in 2013, the silence continued until its appearance at the 2014 Tokyo Game Show, at which point development and progress information was released on a regular basis. A demo for the game, Final Fantasy XV: Episode Duscae, was released in March 2015 with first print copies of Final Fantasy Type-0 HD. Promotion for the title was effectively restarted at the 2015 Gamescom. Its release was delayed due to polishing work and the wish for a simultaneous worldwide release, a first for the series.

Additional media was created to portray the world of XV without using sequels; dubbed the "Final Fantasy XV Universe", it included a feature film, an original net animation, a virtual reality simulation game, multiple mobile projects including an abridged version of the game, ports to Windows and Stadia, and a novel The Dawn of the Future depicting an alternate finale. Cosmetic, gameplay and story-based downloadable content (DLC) were developed between 2016 and 2019 to fix issues raised by players and expand upon the base game.

== Production ==
=== Staff ===
The logo of Final Fantasy XV: designed by Yoshitaka Amano and incorporating the game's themes, the logo survived almost unchanged through the game's development.

Final Fantasy XV (Note: Fainaru Fantajī Fifutīn (Japanese: ファイナルファンタジーXV)) was originally a spin-off title named Final Fantasy Versus XIII, (Note: Fainaru Fantajī Verusasu Sātīn (Japanese: ファイナルファンタジーヴェルサスXIII)) created by Square Enix as part of the wider Final Fantasy franchise. It was directed by Tetsuya Nomura, and produced by Shinji Hashimoto and Yoshinori Kitase. Nomura created the original scenario, designed the main characters, and was one of the designers. The CGI cutscenes were directed by Takeshi Nozue, who had previously worked on Final Fantasy VII: Advent Children. The music was composed by Yoko Shimomura, and the script was written by regular Final Fantasy scenario writer Kazushige Nojima. Tomohiro Hasewaga was art director, the mechanical designer was Takeyuki Takeya, and the event planning director was Jun Akiyama.

After the game's name and platform change in 2012, there were multiple staff reshuffles, though Shimomura, Hashimoto, Hasewaga and Nozue retained their original positions. Nomura became co-director alongside Hajime Tabata, the director of Final Fantasy Type-0, until 2013 when he was assigned to other projects. Saori Itamuro became the new scriptwriter, using Nojima's original scenario as a base for the new work. Kitase left as co-producer, while Yusuke Naora, Isamu Kamikokuryo, and many artists involved in the development of Type-0 were involved. Non-Japanese staff included character designer Roberto Ferrari, and designer Prasert Prasertvithyakarn and Wan Hazmer. The staff as formed in 2012, not counting later additions, was made up of the combined Final Fantasy XV and Type-0 development teams. By 2014, between 200 and 300 people were working on the game.

From 2006 to 2013, Final Fantasy XV was developed by what was then Square Enix 1st Production Department. In the wake of extensive business restructuring in 2013, development was transferred to the newly formed Business Division 2, headed by Tabata and incorporating the core Final Fantasy development team. In 2018, the Final Fantasy XV team was incorporated into Luminous Productions, a subsidiary led by Tabata which continued to work on both a then-untitled project and post-release content for Final Fantasy XV.

Square Enix also recruited help from other development studios: HexaDrive was brought in to help with engineering the game, XPEC Entertainment helped with the design for later sections, Shanghai company Plusmile helped with building design, licensed middleware from Umbra was used to boost the graphics, while Streamline Studios was brought in to help with technical development. It was initially supposed, after an announcement in 2015, that Avalanche Studios was brought on board to help create the game's airship mechanics. In the event, Avalanche and Square Enix did not directly collaborate: instead, Avalanche showed them their level of detail development methods, and Square Enix's internal team created the airship mechanics using that information.

The image illustration and logo design was done by Yoshitaka Amano, who was brought on at the beginning of the game's production and designed the logo based on the game's themes. Several pieces of Amano's original artwork were retained and used in promotion when the game changed from Versus XIII to XV. In contrast to other major parts of the game, the logo artwork survived almost unchanged aside from its coloring. Amano also designed a new version of the logo that faded in during the game's ending, collaborating with the development team on its use. According to Tabata, the new logo signified the beginning of a new journey, and the game's development since it was known as Versus XIII.

=== Development ===
The stories from the past entries in the Final Fantasy series are not exactly as I would have done, but that's as it should be because I didn't direct them. My only concern in terms of Versus XIII is that [Final Fantasy] always talks about human emotion and psychologies in a broad way, and I want to go deeper in terms of offering some crude reality in terms of human emotion or human [behavior]. The goal, when a player holds a controller and plays [a role-playing game], is to make them believe in another world – to experience a dream in a fictional world. It will be different in Versus XIII because of the intrusion of the real world, and things that are really happening. There will be less fiction and more reality.

— Tetsuya Nomura on the story of Final Fantasy XV, then known as Final Fantasy Versus XIII

Final Fantasy Versus XIII was created as part of Fabula Nova Crystallis Final Fantasy, a subseries within the Final Fantasy franchise featuring games linked by a common mythos which included Final Fantasy XIII and Type-0: apart from the mythos, they are completely separate, and each game's staff are able to interpret the mythos for each game. Versus XIII was one of the original titles created for the subseries alongside Final Fantasy XIII, forming the core of the series around which future titles would evolve. Nomura intended Versus XIII to be a heavy departure from his lighthearted Kingdom Hearts series. He attributed this move to his "love for extremes" and explained the direction he took as closer to his personal taste and completely different from what producers had requested him to do in the past. Early in development, Nomura said that the concept and thinking behind the game was unfitting for a regular numbered Final Fantasy installment, thus explaining its original status as a spin-off. His role as director of Versus XIII, in addition to other projects, was a move made following the departure of series creator Hironobu Sakaguchi from the company.

Nomura had created the concept for Versus XIII an unspecified time before production began in 2006. It was being developed by the Kingdom Hearts team as a PlayStation 3 exclusive. Nomura described Versus XIII as the dark side of XIII, emphasized by the game's title. In 2008, it was reported that development was put on hold so the team could complete Final Fantasy XIII. This was later clarified as a mistranslation, with the actual situation being that developers from the Versus XIII team were helping with XIII in their spare time, with development on both games going according to their original schedules. By June 2010, the game's story, and the character and clothing designs had been completed, though it was still in the pre-production phase in June 2011. Full production on Versus XIII began in September of that year, with a planned release in late 2014. According to later staff, Versus XIII was only 20-25% complete when the change of name and platform took place, with Tabata saying it "never really took shape". It was also stated by Tabata that the staff's efforts to fix issues with Versus XIII went on for too long. According to staff, when Tabata arrived the production team were "exhausted and fretful" following the project's collapse.

Due to its growing scale, talks about changing Versus XIII into the next numbered Final Fantasy were happening as early as 2007. When Type-0, originally titled Final Fantasy Agito XIII, was renamed, and the PlayStation 4 and Xbox One were presented to Square Enix in 2011, it was decided to shift the game onto those consoles. For a time, a PlayStation 3 version continued development, but after a title change announcement could not be made in 2012, the shortening lifespan of the console caused concern. After some trial and error, the PlayStation 3 was abandoned as lead platform in favor of a DirectX 11-based structure allowing easy porting to next-generation systems. Another presumed reason for the shift was the game's protracted development and escalating budget. Versus XIII was rebranded as Final Fantasy XV, resuming development in this form in July 2012. A proposal to turn the game into a musical after Nomura watched the 2012 film adaptation of Les Misérables was vetoed by the higher-ups at Square Enix.

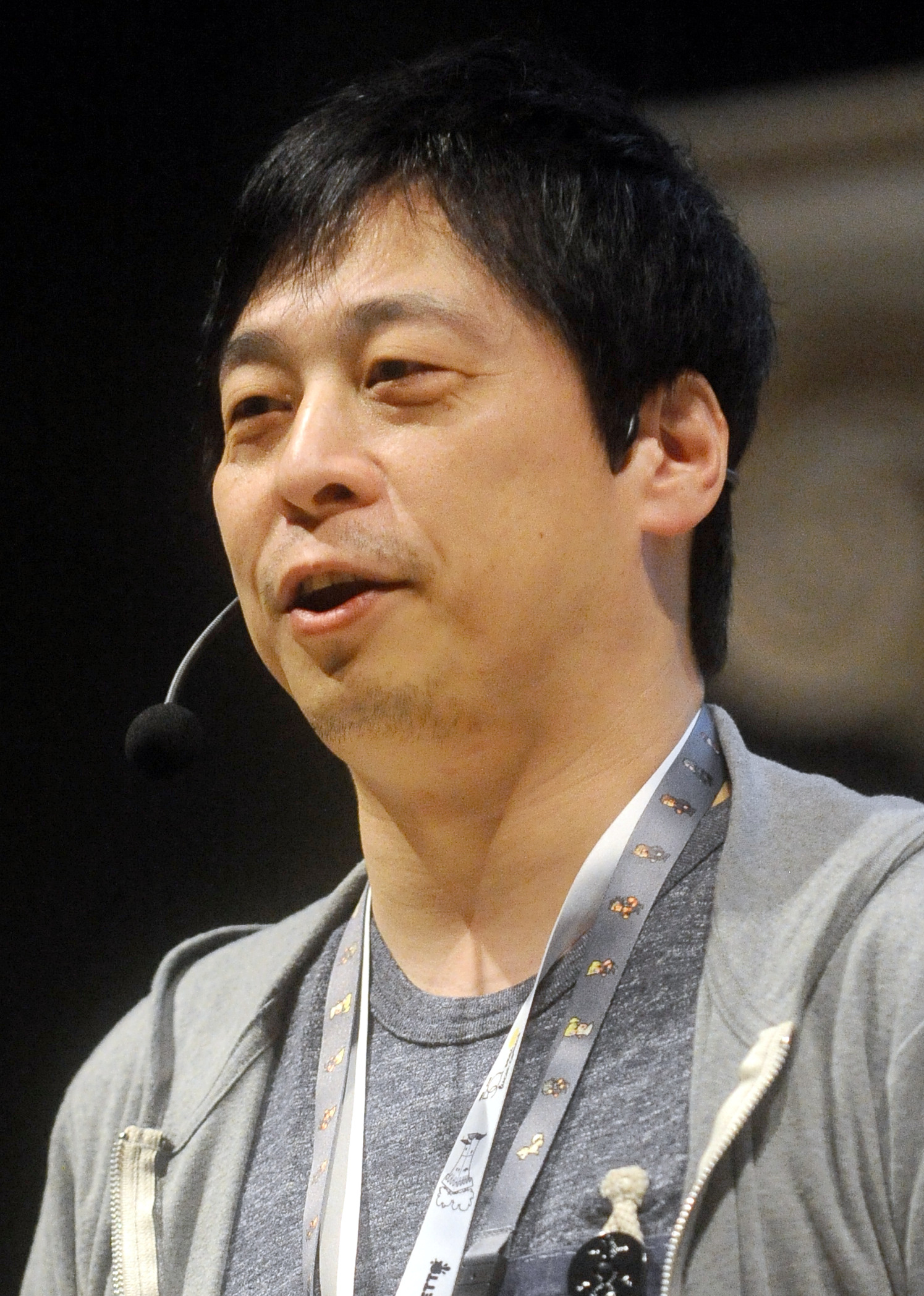
Hajime Tabata served as the director of Final Fantasy XV from 2014 to its release, assuming the role of producer for its post-release content prior to his departure from Square Enix in 2018.

At the beginning of development for Final Fantasy XV, the new team reviewed the content of Versus XIII and decided what could be sensibly carried over to the new project. While many design elements were retained, some needed to be changed or removed. Tabata's new position as co-director and eventually sole director was related to this change. The separate engine, gameplay, graphics and design sections of the team were merged into one unit to help with development. Nomura remained as co-director alongside Tabata so the project could remain as true to the original vision as possible, after which he was reassigned to other company projects including Kingdom Hearts III. Due to the state of Versus XIII during 2012, Square Enix's then-CEO Yoichi Wada was considering cancelling outright so the team could start from scratch under Tabata's direction. Most of Tabata's team were reluctant to merge with Nomura's team due to the negative reputation Versus XIII had within the company, with Tabata taking six months to bring them all round to the idea. Tabata officially became sole director in December 2013.

Development initially followed the pattern of the company's previous high-budget games, but the team realized that such techniques had become dated. During the later part of development, Tabata's main concern was keeping the game on schedule instead of letting the development become delayed by technology experimentation. Despite the protracted development, the budget was kept under strict control. A major issue was deciding what elements to carry over and what had to be changed or discarded, as the project was already known and fans had expectations. When describing his attitude to development, Tabata described the team set-up as "horizontal", using a non-hierarchical staff structure to help speed up the exchange of information and feedback between departments. This drastic shift rare among major Japanese game developers, and met with a mixed reaction from staff: some were elated at their new freedom, while others felt downgraded. Including the initial work on Versus XIII, the game's development spanned approximately ten years from conception to release: despite its origins, Tabata considers Versus XIII and Final Fantasy XV to be two separate entities. Speaking later, Tabata said that the developers were "playing it by ear", as little of the final game's content was set prior to his taking over.

=== Post-release support ===
Both free and paid downloadable content (DLC) was planned as early as April 2016. The main aim was to make players feel they had made a good purchase with the base game. Full production began after the main game was completed in November 2016. Square Enix revealed that the DLC was not content cut from the game itself, but original content to add new experiences for players. Reception of the first wave of story-based DLC was so strong that the team decided to create a second wave of content. During this period, production shifted from Business Division 2 to Luminous Productions, who worked simultaneously on the post-release content and their new IP. Tabata continued overseeing development as producer, but later got steadily less interested in the project, and wanted to go ahead on "his own path" without inconveniencing anyone at Square Enix. After internal discussions, Tabata decided to leave Square Enix and form his own studio. It was also decided by Luminous Productions to focus on development of their new IP, contributing to the DLC's cancellation. The company parted with Tabata on good terms, but the decision was made to cancel all but one of the subsequent DLC episodes and end post-release support for the game following that episode's 2019 release. Announced features related to the PC port such as mod support were also cancelled.

== Design ==
=== Story and characters ===
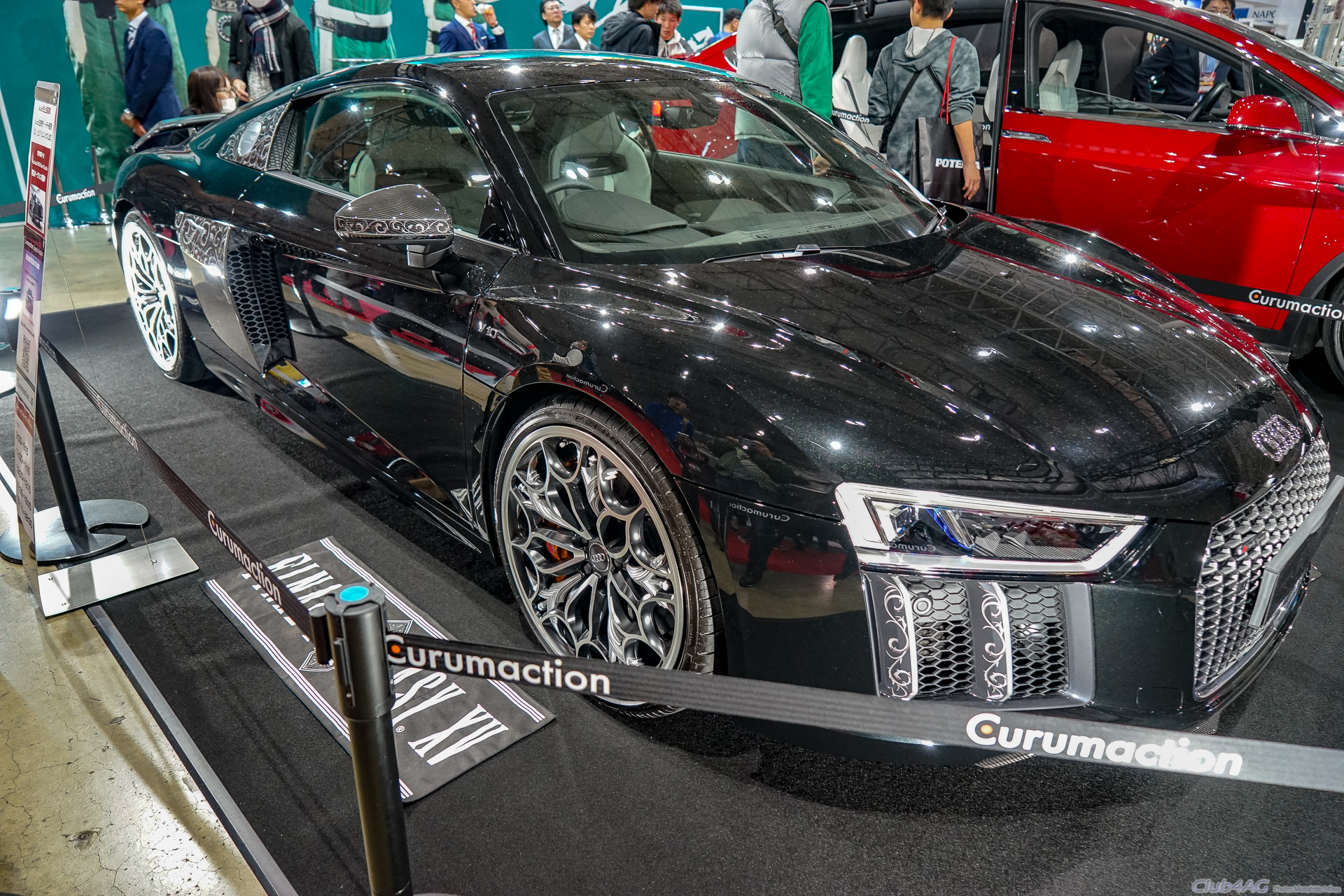
A replica of the Regalia

Nomura wanted the game's characters to be realistic compared to earlier entries despite a similar story structure; his aim was for a story "about men in the real world", with less fantasy elements and a darker tone. From 2010 onwards, the story underwent frequent revisions, and following the name change multiple aspects were changed, including the removal of story sequences and the redesigning of characters. The most notable change was the replacement of original heroine Stella Nox Fleuret with the similarly-named Lunafreya. Tatsuhisa Suzuki, who voiced protagonist Noctis Lucis Caelum, later stated that two thirds of the planned script was cut. When consulted over the proposed changes, Nojima was content as long as the original concept remained, giving the team the needed confidence to make the changes. The story's ending was left deliberately ambiguous so players could imagine what came next. The concept of reaper-worship from the original scenario was toned down, as it would have been a violation of age-rating criteria in some countries; explicit references to those elements were replaced with the general impression of black being a special color for the main cast and their home country.

The game's main theme is "bonds", represented by the relationships between Noctis and his comrades, and between Noctis and his father Regis. A key narrative element was Noctis' personal journey from prince to king, with the story taking place over a decade to portray Noctis's journey. As opposed to earlier Final Fantasy games which jumped between different character groups, the game focused almost entirely on the central cast, with developments concerning the supporting cast happening off-screen. This was chosen to make the main cast more compelling and create a narrative based on their point of view. In contrast to many previous Final Fantasy titles, the playable cast of Final Fantasy XV is all-male, although women still played key roles in the story. This was influenced by Nomura's wish for a road movie vibe and experiences from his youth. The main cast's outfits were designed by Hiromu Takahara, lead designer for Japanese fashion house Roen. He was brought on when Nomura was occupied with other duties within Square Enix, with the goal being to maintain the game's realism using designs influenced by Western fashion. Takahara's designs were retained during the transition as they were a core part of the initial project.

=== World design ===
When first announced, XV used the mythos of Fabula Nova Crystallis, described by Kitase as "a backdrop and starting point" for the story. For Versus XIII, Nomura decided to focus more on the world and on realistic human characters. The terminology of the mythos, including the concept of l'Cie (magically imbued warriors burdened with a pre-determined task), was originally present in Versus XIII. A key figure in the mythos, the Goddess Etro, was originally represented in-game in a piece of artwork by Amano and was a key deity worshiped in the game world. During the transition process between Versus XIII and XV, the game "disconnected" from the mythos' core framework, existing as a thematic base for the world and story without being overtly expressed. (Note: Quote from Famitsu: ――ではもうひとつ。神話や神についての設定は、『FFヴェルサスXIII』から『FFXV』への移行により変更があるのでしょうか。 田畑:『FFXV』にする段階で、そこまでに固まっていた設定については、神話とは強く絡めず『FFXV』の設定として取り込んでいます。ファブラの神話として出てくるものではありませんが、ベースとして活きています。) While the adjustments were being decided upon, it was chosen to keep the mythos as part of XV, as much of the world was built upon it and would lose a lot of its substance if removed entirely. Instead, the team chose to adjust the mythos to fit the game's modern setting. Specific terminology such as "l'Cie" was removed so the game would retain an individual identity and introduce the concepts in an understandable way. A common theme carried over was defined by Tabata as the struggles of humans chosen by the divine crystal. The revised cosmology drew inspiration from Japanese folklore and various Western mythologies. The game's summoned monsters, referred to as "Astrals", were designed to play integral parts in the story and world as opposed to being simple monsters to be called into battle. They were intelligent beings that Noctis needed to forge a pact with rather than simply commanding them. Due to their key role in the story, the staff chose traditional Final Fantasy summons such as Leviathan and Titan instead of creating ones unique to the game.

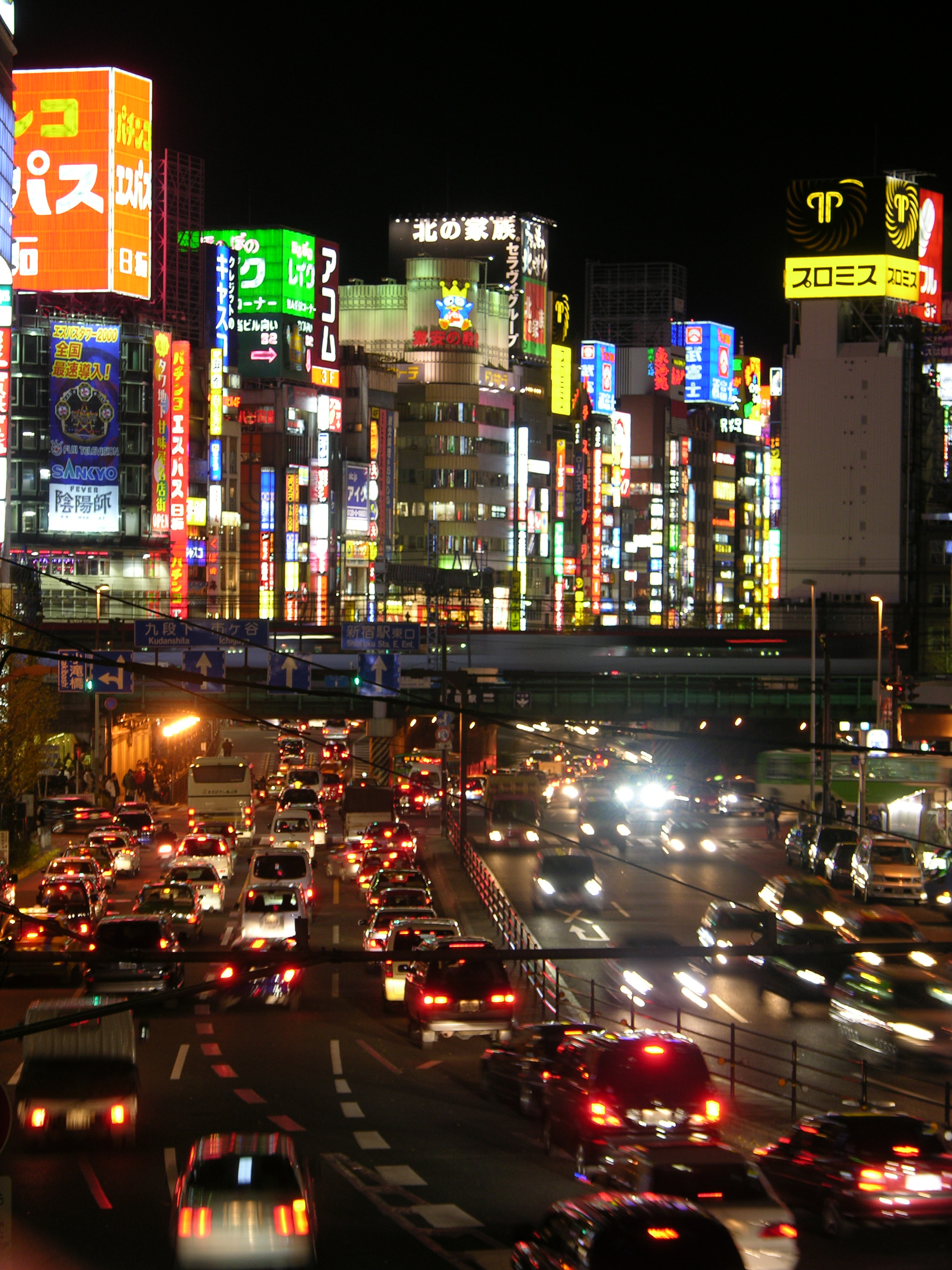
Shinjuku, Tokyo was the primary inspiration for Insomnia, capital of Lucis.

The central theme of the world and story is "fantasy based on reality": a real world-based setting with fantasy elements merged with the familiar. Realizing this aspect of the game was quite difficult before the game's platform change. Nomura had wanted to use a present-day setting for a Final Fantasy game since its first scrapped proposal for Final Fantasy VII (1997). As such, some of the designs in Final Fantasy XV were based on real-world locations including the districts of Tokyo, the Piazza San Marco and St Mark's Basilica in Venice, the Bahamas, and natural locations such as a cavern in Chiba Prefecture. Insomnia, the crown city of Lucis, was directly inspired by the Shinjuku, Tokyo area where Square Enix is based, with other areas being replicas of locations including the Shuto Expressway and a tunnel in the Ginza district. The team created these by driving down the real-world locations repeatedly during their research. The design inspirations for Niflheim ranged from the Roman Empire to pre-Germanic and Germanic civilizations. The game's theme of "fantasy based on reality" was emphasized on multiple levels in the environments, such as the blending of realism and fantasy in Insomnia, and the camping equipment, which was included through a collaboration with Coleman Company.

An element in the original design concept was vast and seamless environments for set piece moments, such as the player being shot at from a distance or a battle taking place both inside and ourside a building. Nomura instructed his team to study third-person shooters for reference, "not in simplistic terms, like controls or mechanics, but in the way they create tension and mood and incorporate the action within that". This carried over into Final Fantasy XV, with the stated aim being to distance the game structurally from XIII and its sequels, which featured divided zones rather than a large seamless world. The original inspiration behind this approach was the world design of The Legend of Zelda: Ocarina of Time, with later inspirations being modern Western triple-A open world titles. The environments types were divided between three separate teams working on the world map, smaller locations, and dungeons respectively. Specific pieces of concept art were created to represent different regions and aesthetic concepts; a single building design was used to capture the essence of Altissia's Venice-inspired atmosphere, while older car designs when compared to the party's vehicle Regalia reflected the lack of human advancement outside Lucis.

For the monster designs, Tabata gave art director Tomohiro Hasegawa the goal of realism equivalent to the photography of National Geographic, with the first monster designed around this being the Behemoth. For mystical enemies, the team went towards "throwback" designs, using popular enemy designs from the series' history. Some monsters drew extensively from real-life animals while having fantastical elements such as the Mesmenir, while others like the Goblins and Naga reused designs created by Amano for earlier entries. The Ronin was designed to resemble the traditional dress style of its namesake, with both the clothing and fabric created using descriptions from books and images of antique samurai clothing and swords. The game's mounts, recurring galliform birds called Chocobos, were designed so players would feel affection for them. The most challenging part of the design was adding fantastic flourishes while keeping it from being garish. Another recurring Final Fantasy creature, the Moogle, was originally present in Versus XIII, and was going to be similar in design to its Final Fantasy Type-0 incarnation. Moogles were initially dropped from XV, but reinstated following fan feedback. Due to the game being close to completion, it was a "token" inclusion that would not impact the main development.

=== Music ===
The game's original score was primarily composed and arranged by Yoko Shimomura, who was most widely known for her work on the Kingdom Hearts series and was a first-time composer for the Final Fantasy series. Working on the greater majority of the soundtrack, Shimomura was involved throughout the game's development cycle. The theme song of Versus XIII, "Somnus", was sung by Aundréa L. Hopkins; its lyrics were written by Nomura, which were translated and adapted into Latin by Taro Yamashita and Kazuhiro Komiya. When Versus XIII was rebranded as XV, "Somnus" was retained as an important theme, though it was replaced as the official theme song. (Note: Quote from Gematsu: Tabata: "Stand by Me" is now the official song, but "Somnus" is still in the game and used in a very important way.) The game's theme song is a cover of Ben E. King's "Stand by Me", performed by the English indie rock band Florence and the Machine and sung by the band's leader Florence Welch. In addition to "Stand by Me", Florence and the Machine created two original songs inspired by the world and story of XV: "Too Much Is Never Enough" and "I Will Be".

For the game's additional media, the music was handled by other composers such as John R. Graham, Yasuhisa Inoue and Susumi Akizuki. Music for later content was handled by Yoshitaka Suzuki; guest composers were brought in for major story expansions, including Keiichi Okabe, Naoshi Mizuta, Yasunori Mitsuda and Nobuo Uematsu. The game's soundtrack was released on December 21, 2016, with multiple editions being created. The three songs by Florence and the Machine were released under the banner title "Songs from Final Fantasy XV" as digital singles on August 12 for iTunes, Google Play and Spotify. Tracks from the game were released on other albums of Shimomura's music, and "Somnus" was featured as downloadable content for Theatrhythm Final Fantasy.

=== Graphics ===
During its initial development, Versus XIII used Crystal Tools, a proprietary game engine created by Square Enix for seventh-generation gaming hardware that would be used throughout the company for multiple games, including XIII and XIV. Later, Tabata described the Crystal Tools hardware as an extension of the technology of the previous gaming generation. During 2010, Nomura revealed that the team were using real world-based physical calculations to determine weather and cloud behavior in-game. By 2011, the game was no longer using Crystal Tools, and instead used a specially designed proprietary gameplay engine combined by lighting technology from Luminous Engine, an engine built for eighth-generation gaming hardware. The focus on realism influenced the decision to incorporate the more advanced lighting technology, while the specially designed engine had a limited area of use. The troubles with the original engine and its transition was a factor in the title's prolonged production.

The planned scale of the open world increased so much that the older technology eventually became obsolete as it was restricting the developers. The need to create new technology to cope with these problems further added to initial development difficulties. The original plan was to have interactive real-time event scenes. Nomura felt that regular storytelling cutscenes in other games interrupted gameplay and caused players to skip them. Furthermore, the development frame could theoretically be shortened as there was no need to create cutscenes-exclusive high-polygon character models. However, seamless transitions of these events into the gameplay were hard to achieve and instead increased the time that had to be invested by the team. After the full shift onto eighth-generation platforms, multiple planned elements were influenced by the new Luminous technology: the in-game cutscene camera was optimized to work similarly to the one used in pre-rendered movies, and more environmental and gameplay elements could be included such as an increased number of destructible environments and the player character's warping to faraway spots on the game maps. It also enabled Nomura to start experimenting with higher facial detail for enemies such as behemoths.

When the game was renamed and changed platforms, the team chose the Luminous Engine as the main game engine. The game's real-time graphics used 5,000 polygons per-frame, bringing its visual quality close to modern CGI cutscenes and to a level that would have been impossible for the previous generation's hardware. During the transition from Versus XIII and the optimization of the Luminous Engine for game development, the team created a conceptual environment using a prototype engine environment called "Ebony". After the initial reveal there were difficulties with the new hardware, with HexaDrive being brought on the help due to their experience with high-spec gaming hardware. To solve the issues faced by Final Fantasy XV, the team used a similar development approach to Ubisoft: they created an approximate game system that they could build on and edit in real-time. Graphics and animation were developed first, followed by a cinematics editor and a system to manage events during transitions between cutscenes and gameplay. This latter element was what allowed the developers to create what would become the game's final version. To help maximize the realism of the characters, their hair was first created by a hairstylist using a mannequin's wig, then rendered into the game using the technology of the Luminous Engine. The same technique was used for Agni's Philosophy, the engine's 2012 demo. Character movements were created using motion capture technology: the animators' movements were first captured while they wore special suits, then their actions were adjusted in the team's computer to perfect them and make minor additions like finger movements. These actions were then implemented in the game environment for the intended characters.

During production, Tabata and the new development staff used experience from a failed attempt to develop an eighth-generation console sequel to Final Fantasy Type-0 when handling the new hardware. While using Luminous Studio for games other than Final Fantasy XV was considered during production, the engine's technology manager Julien Merceron advised against it until it has been proven and released in a finished form. While CGI cutscenes created by dedicated Square Enix subsidiary Visual Works were present throughout its lifetime, there were far fewer than originally planned in the final game. The team instead relied on real-time cutscenes as much as possible, except for scenes with a scale too great to use real-time graphics. The transition to next-generation hardware enabled the team to better realize their original vision for the game, as conveyed in the original reveal trailer. Visual Works also worked closely with the team during development of 3D modelling systems, due to their previous experiences with such technology in cutscene development.

=== Gameplay ===
While the basic gameplay concepts remained intact, several elements were changed between the original concept for Final Fantasy Versus XIII (above) and Final Fantasy XV (below).

Versus XIII used an action-based combat system based primarily on the Kingdom Hearts battle system, with third-person shooter elements being incorporated. Characters were intended to be fast, with early trailers using a slower pace to show off the combat. Noctis and his companions were all controllable, had unique weapons and skills, and were able to controls mechs and airships. Magic was available to all characters, but only when Noctis was a part of the party, a consideration tied to the story. A job system was in place for enemies, with cited examples being dragoons and summoners. Environments outside cities also featured a day-night cycle and roaming enemies, with different enemy monsters appearing at different times of day. Several initial concepts for the game had to be abandoned; a planned first-person view and the lack of a heads-up display (HUD) were scrapped as incompatible with the Final Fantasy series. An overhead camera view was also considered for the open field areas, but it was decided against so the player would remain immersed. When the final Versus XIII trailer was released in 2011, the HUD was a mixture of finalized and temporary elements. There were also plans for the game to have a "unique" support setup for the Sixaxis controller. Although after the game's transition there were technological and mechanical changes, the basic elements established in trailers such as Noctis' warping and weapon abilities were carried over.

In the final game's combat, dubbed the Active Cross Battle system, Noctis was made the only player-controlled character with other party members governed by the game's artificial intelligence (AI). The team experimented with a multi-character battle system, but decided that it presented too many development difficulties. Noctis' weapons were to be arranged in a deck, and contextually activated in combat, but this was changed to a system of free weapon switching and context-sensitive special attacks. The controls were changed to focus on single-button combat tied to timed attacks and contextually activated special abilities, in addition to co-op attacks triggered with other members of the party. One ability carried over from Versus XIII was Noctis's Limit Break "Armiger", where he summoned multiple weapons into battle to attack and defend; this was initially seen in the original trailer for Final Fantasy XV, and later in both the demo and the final game. Noctis was to have been the only character to wield magic, but as this would not have worked from a gameplay perspective, the team created a story-related pretext that allowed other characters to wield magic. After the demo's release, the combat was polished and other systems incorporated, with work continuing up until the final version was released. The navigation was described after its 2014 re-reveal as "open world": Tabata later clarified that while character progression was driven by the story, the various areas within the world could be freely explored by players. He also wished for a fusion of gameplay and story similar to The Last of Us.

Based on feedback from the game's first commercial demo, adjustable difficulty settings were added in the form of players changing "battle modes" to alter the speed and complexity of battles. A major element added to the game was Prompto Argentum's ability to take photographs. As the character had garnered negative feedback from players, Tabata wanted to make the character more useful and appealing to players, and so it was incorporated into the game so players could chronicle their journey. The inclusion of an airship function into the party's vehicle came from Tabata's wish to keep the party in the Regalia while simulating the experience of landing an aircraft. The team experimented with enabling compatibility with virtual reality headsets, but this proved impractical as players would likely be wearing them for hours at a time due to the game's size. The game's shift during the second half of the story to a linear structure was based on story requirements and budgetary restrictions, as making the entire experience open world would have doubled development time and costs. Many elements added to the game in later updates, such as controlling all the main characters, had to be discarded from the main game due to technological and budget-based restrictions.

The lead designer for the game's AI was Yoichiro Miyake, who was one of the core team members for the game's engine. Miyake's early concept was for an AI that would learn and memorise new actions, with the final game using a type designed based two standard AI designs: behavior-based, which revolved around adaptation and decision making, and state-based, which made decisions based on the environment. The amount of effort put into the AI was directly inspired by experiences of developing games for the previous console generation: the emphasis had been put on graphics, causing the AI and other gameplay-related elements to suffer. Between the release of its commercial demo and the full release, the AI underwent further refinement. The AI functions were divided into different categories to manage different behaviour types, with interconnected elements and hierarchies put in place to manage the large amount of actions required. Different levels and styles of AI were created for different groups of non-playable characters within XV's world, from the main party members to non-playable characters (NPCs) around the world. To ensure the navigation-AI worked properly for enemies and monsters, a system dubbed the "Point Query System" (PQS) was created, which could direct and steer them in a realistic manner while avoiding collisions with objects in the environment or other moving elements. The decision to create high-quality reactive AI for Noctis' companions influenced the choice to make Noctis the only playable character.

== Business ==
=== Announcement ===
A screenshot from the original trailer for Final Fantasy Versus XIII, showing Noctis displaying his powers. The initial trailers would continue to influence development goals for the game despite story and gameplay changes.

Versus XIII was originally announced at E3 2006 through a CGI trailer. The trailer, which showed Noctis advancing on a group of enemy soldiers, was created by Visual Works as a representation of what the development team were aiming for. The trailer also featured a quote from William Shakespeare's Hamlet: "[There] is nothing either good or bad, but thinking makes it so", intended to evoke Nomura's intended atmosphere. After its initial announcement, the title was absent from multiple gaming events for several successive years, although a video showing an extended version of the reveal trailer was released in 2007 at a fan event. Two trailers were released in 2008, including in-game footage at the Tokyo Game Show (TGS). Footage of navigation was shown at TGS the following year in a closed theater. Its appearance at E3 2010 was apparently prevented due to multiple technical issues. Its final appearance as Versus XIII was at a Square Enix Press Conference in January 2011, appearing alongside other video games then in production. Because of its sporadic appearances in the public eye and its absence after the 2011 event, industry commentators labeled Final Fantasy XV as vaporware while it was still known as Versus XIII. In June 2012, there were rumors that the game had been cancelled, but those were swiftly refuted by Wada. After that, further rumors emerged claiming that it had either been quietly cancelled, or renamed and shifted to another platform during development.

Its name and platform change were officially announced at E3 2013, with further trailers showcasing the game concept released later. The trailer was again a concept piece consisting mostly of CGI rather than actual gameplay footage. Staff later stated that Final Fantasy XV had been announced and displayed too early. The game's next official appearance was at TGS 2014, with the announcement of its commercial demo, and a tech demo showing off the game's engine. After its reappearance, regular livestreamed shows called "Active Time Reports" (ATR) were broadcast, giving updates to the game and responses to fan questions. According to Tabata, the ATRs were created to help fans left confused by the game's change of platform and title, along with establishing a two-way communication with the fanbase. During 2015, official forums were created to allow the developers to receive direct feedback from fans. Starting from February 12, the Japanese forums were discontinued and replaced with a developer's blog. Their stated reason was to offer a more accessible medium for both feedback and developer updates.

After its appearance at the 2014 Paris Games Week, Tabata announced that the release window was "roughly decided", with the company recruiting new staff to work on the master build. While it did not show at E3 2015, it did appear at that year's Gamescom, which Tabata said was the beginning of its official marketing campaign leading up to further announcements. As part of the marketing, the game was distanced from the Fabula Nova Crystallis subseries, as it would have placed symbolic limits upon their target audience. The game's minimal showing at the event caused a negative reaction from fans, with Tabata stating that Square Enix underestimated the importance of the event. Between May and November 2015, the publicity was deliberately kept low-key so staff could focus on completing the pre-beta version of the game. Production on the beta version and progression to the debugging phase began in 2016. The master version, which would be played at release, was completed in August, although further technical polishing took place after this.

=== Demos ===
During its TGS 2014 presentation, the real-time demonstration footage was dubbed Final Fantasy XV: The Overture, which demonstrated the graphic capabilities in Luminous Studio and the effect of environmental changes on gameplay. While it was intended as a one-off presentation, the team said they were considering creating a second demo for release in Japan based on The Overture. A demo featuring the battle against the Astral Titan was featured at E3 2016: while drawing on a part of the game, the fight was tailored for the demo so it could be completed within a ten-minute window, with the full version having different victory requirements. A Japan-exclusive commercial demo dubbed Judgement Disc was released on November 11. Spanning the game's events up to the middle of the first chapter, it was designed to allow players to judge the game's merits.

The game also received an international demo titled Final Fantasy XV: Episode Duscae. The idea behind Episode Duscae was to give players a personal look at the game due to its long absence from the public eye, as well as demonstrate its gameplay and the fact that it was being actively developed. It was named after one of the regions in the game. The demo is set during the opening segment of XV, where the party temporarily lose their car and must gather funds for its repair by taking on jobs in the region. Gameplay and main story elements were tailored for a demo experience. One of the features left out was the ability for players to rent Chocobos, while the battle system was a slimmed-down version of what was planned for the final game, using the originally planned preset weapon deck feature. The character Cindy was also included. A summon with a simplified method of acquirement was also put into the game: originally intended to be Titan, it was replaced with Ramuh due to the former being a key character in the story.

After TGS 2014, where Episode Duscae was first announced, Tabata and the team adjusted the gameplay experience based on fan feedback. The original plan was for a large area of the worldmap that players could explore using the car. While the ability to drive the party's car was originally included, it was later cut as Tabata feared that the feature would be too new for older fans of the series, who might have mistaken XV for "a driving game". The team decided to focus on the characters and environment. The demo included English and Japanese audio for all regions. The demo released in all regions alongside the physical and digital releases of Final Fantasy Type-0 HD. The physical version was exclusive to day-one editions of Type-0 HD, while the digital version was valid for two months after purchase. The code had to be redeemed within one year of purchase. While players could save their progress in the demo, save data could not be carried over to the main game. Despite this, the team announced its intention to create a bonus for those who purchased the demo. A patch titled Episode Duscae 2.0 was released in June 2015, which included enhancements for the camera and controls, fixes for bugs, and adjustments to gameplay. The demo ran on Version 1.5 of Luminous Studio.

A free tech demo, Platinum Demo: Final Fantasy XV was released on March 30, 2016. Birthed from the initial announced wish to develop a second tech demo, Platinum Demo was created in two months using completed assets from the main game. First announced two months earlier in January, it was designed to showcase the game's graphics and physics, along with elements of its final combat system. Set in a dream world after Noctis is gravely wounded as a child, it follows his journey back to consciousness, guided by a creature called Carbuncle that protects Noctis. Players who completed the demo are able to name Carbuncle in the main game. According to Tabata, Platinum Demo served a dual purpose: it both introduced players to the gameplay mechanics, and gave them insight into Noctis' young life and his relationship with his father. It was originally intended to be a less emotive experience, but changed to being story-driven to better introduce players to the game's world. The demo was removed from sale in March 2017.

=== Release ===
The game's year of release was officially announced at the 2015 PAX Prime event, with its release date set to be revealed at a special event the following year. Another announcement from that time was that Tabata was aiming for a simultaneous worldwide release, a first for the Final Fantasy series. This was later clarified by Tabata at the 2016 Taipei Game Show: Square Enix was aiming to release the game within the same time period across the world, although there might be minor variations depending on regions. The special event, called "Uncovered: Final Fantasy XV", took place on March 30 at the Shrine Auditorium in Los Angeles, California, hosted by internet celebrities Greg Miller and Tim Gettys. The event was livestreamed worldwide. Free limited tickets for the event were made available on February 5 for North American residents. By the next day, all tickets had been claimed. Its former release date, September 30, was announced on the first day of the event. According to Tabata, this release date was decided upon in 2013 based on projected development time and costs.

In August, rumors began circulating that Final Fantasy XV had been delayed by two months. Tabata later confirmed that the game's worldwide release had been delayed to November 29: alongside the announcement was an official apology to fans for the delay. The reason he gave was that, while the game had reached fully playable form, the team was not satisfied with the overall quality they were aiming for, so the extra time would be dedicated to polishing XV further. In addition, he wanted to give players without an online connection the full experience without needing a Day One patch. Tabata confirmed in a later interview that he was the one who requested the extension after the master disc had been created for mass distribution. Patches following the initial release allowed support for the PlayStation 4 Pro and Xbox One X models, featuring enhanced graphics, resolution and framerate.

==== Localization ====
The English localization of XV was led by Dan Inoue. One of the aspects of the localization was using different accents to show the characters coming from different regions of the world: a cited example was Ignis Scientia, who spoke with a British accent while the other main characters spoke with an American accent. For the game's lore, the team made a conscious effort to move away from the esoteric terminology Final Fantasy had gained a reputation for. They used understandable names like "Astral" and "Daemon". To stop the lore becoming uninteresting, the divine beings' speech was made very impersonal—such as Gentiana not using "I" or "You" during her dialogue—and using interpretive dialogue for simple concepts. Different issues raised later included Ignis' localized lines, which changed aspects of the character interaction, and the alteration of Cindy's name from the original "Cidney".

In an interview with Famitsu during Gamescom, Tabata revealed that the main reason for the delays in XV's release were related to the game's localization and debugging, as the team wanted to bring the game out in the west close to its Japanese release. The decision for a simultaneous release meant the localization had to happen alongside the game production, with no extra time for tweaks and corrections. In addition to being released with French and German dubs and text translation for those respective regions, it was also localized for Latin America with Latin American Spanish and Brazilian Portuguese text: this was the first time a Final Fantasy title was localized into these languages.

One of the early issues, which drew public attention with the release of Episode Duscae, was Noctis' English voice actor. In Episode Duscae, his voice was pitched rather low, making the character seem older and less energetic than his Japanese counterpart. This was explained as being due to tight scheduling removing the opportunity for Tabata to catch the issue and re-record before it was time for release. After Episode Duscae, the voice work was redone to better convey Noctis' personality. The localization methods also ended up backfiring due to the dialogue matching mechanism for characters causing line repetition or omission. They also needed to deal with the clash between normal dialogue and the fantastic elements, which threatened to undermine the narrative. This forced the different pieces of media to take different approaches, and some scripted character interactions to join up the different sides of the narrative.

==== Versions and editions ====
In addition to the standard release, Day One, Deluxe, and Ultimate Collector's Editions were also released. The former contained a copy of XV, an exclusive "Masamune" sword, and platform-specific elements such as Xbox Live avatars and PS4 themes. The Deluxe Edition additionally included a copy of Kingsglaive on Blu-ray, a steelbook case featuring Amano's official artwork, and promotional content in the form of an additional outfit for Noctis, and a recolor of their vehicle. The latter edition included the content of the Deluxe Edition, alongside a Blu-ray release of Brotherhood, a special soundtrack, a hardcover artbook, further promotional content in the form of in-game items, and a Play Arts Kai figurine of Noctis. Preorders opened on March 30, and the Ultimate Collector's Edition was limited to a 30,000 unit print run. A further 10,000 copies of the Japanese Ultimate Collector's Edition were produced due to increased demand, alongside further copies for North America and Europe. The limited quantity was due to the difficulties producing Noctis' figurine. No further additional shipments were created.

In a collaboration with Sony, Square Enix produced a themed PS4 console bundle: dubbed the "Luna Edition", it came with the console, a copy of the game, a copy of Kingsglaive, and multiple pieces of DLC. The bundle was available in Japan, North America and Europe alongside the game: in North America, it was exclusive to GameStop. Europe also received a standard edition bundle with a plain PS4 console. Digital premium editions for PS4 and Xbox One featured added in-game items such as weapons and cosmetic elements for both the game and the console. Both versions also came with a season pass, allowing free access to DLC. Later, a "Royal Edition" was released on March 8, 2018, concurrent with the Windows version. The game includes all DLC released up to that point along with additional content including new boss fights, story sequences and lore. The Royal Edition content was also released as separate DLC for standard editions.

A version for personal computers (PC) running the Windows 10 operating system was released on March 6, 2018 through Steam and Origin. Titled Final Fantasy XV: Windows Edition and developed in cooperation with Nvidia using an upgraded version of the Luminous Studio engine, the game includes multiple graphical enhancements, and comes packaged with all free and paid DLC released up to that point. A port for the streaming-based Stadia platform was released on November 19, 2019 as a launch title. It was developed in-house by Luminous Productions. The Stadia release featured all accompanying DLC and expansion material, and exclusive challenge missions. The console version was made available in Japan through NTT Docomo's subscription service for streaming on mobile phones on May 21, 2020.

== Final Fantasy XV Universe ==
The key visual for the original net animation series Brotherhood: Final Fantasy XV, a part of the multimedia "Final Fantasy XV Universe". Brotherhood, together with the CGI feature film Kingsglaive, enabled the expansion of story and characters while keeping Final Fantasy XV as a single video game.

Sequels to Final Fantasy XV were hinted at with the line "A World of the Versus Epic" in the E3 2013 trailer. Nomura explained that the game had a self-contained climax and that it was the first part of an intended continued epic. He said that Square Enix was considering using online elements and developing shorter stand-alone titles to keep players interested and to avoid long waiting times for them. This was interpreted as a move of the company towards a digitally distributed episodic format for possible sequels. Nomura later clarified at the Japan Expo 2013 that no plans for sequels had been finalized. Later, Tabata stated in interviews that Final Fantasy XV would be released as a single complete experience, and that no sequel was planned. In addition, there were no plans for multiple endings or a cliffhanger ending, with Tabata citing the XIII trilogy as a video game narrative style they were trying not to emulate. Despite this wish, the scale of XV's world and story would have needed multiple games to tell the entire story. To avoid turning Final Fantasy XV into a series of games, the team instead produced additional media surrounding XV, turning it into a multimedia project: while the main game could be enjoyed on its own, the other media could be used as introductions to the setting for newcomers. This project is being referred by Square Enix as the "Final Fantasy XV Universe". According to Tabata, the Universe is split into two halves; media designed to reach a wider audience than the game might manage alone, and additional game-related content such as ports to other hardware and DLC.

The two major parts of the "Final Fantasy XV Universe" were the original net animation series Brotherhood: Final Fantasy XV and the CGI feature film Kingsglaive: Final Fantasy XV. Brotherhood was produced by Square Enix and A-1 Pictures and was released through the game's official YouTube channel and anime streaming website Crunchyroll between March and September 2016. Each episode details the backstory of Noctis from his childhood to the game's opening, along with the backstories of his companions. The first and last episodes of the anime tie in with the Platinum Demo. The anime is intended to give people a view into Noctis' mind that would have appeared incongruous within the context of a video game. Kingsglaive was a joined production shared between the original staff of Advent Children and multiple Western companies including Digic Pictures, who had worked on the graphics for the Assassin's Creed series; and Image Engine, who had worked on multiple films including Jurassic World and the television series Game of Thrones. While similar in appearance to Advent Children, Kingsglaive had a different goal behind its development: while Advent Children was made for dedicated fans of Final Fantasy VII, Kingsglaive was made as an introduction for newcomers to the world of XV, along with conveying some of Regis' backstory. Digic Pictures later collaborated with Square Enix on "Omen", a promotional trailer based on the world and story of XV. Another anime feature, a short film titled Episode Ardyn Prologue which detailed the backstory of antagonist Ardyn Izunia, was released on February 12, 2019.

To promote the game, and also forming part of the collection, a mobile app titled Justice Monsters Five was developed. Based on an arcade-style mini-game from XV, it used gameplay similar to the Monster Strike series and incorporated classic Final Fantasy monsters. Justice Monsters Five was released on August 30 for mobile platforms, and was eventually shut down on March 27, 2017, seven months after its initial release. A planned Windows 10 version was not released. A second promotional item was A King's Tale: Final Fantasy XV, released through GameStop and EB Games in North America as a free pre-order bonus. Playing as an arcade-style beat 'em up, A King's Tale relates King Regis' exploits thirty years before the game's events, told to the young Noctis by Regis as fairy tales. The game was later made available for free for PS4 and Xbox One on March 1, 2017. In addition, another mobile game titled King's Knight: Wrath of the Dark Dragon was released in the same year. It is a remake of the 1986 game, and was available in XV as a game Noctis and his friends play. Square Enix and Machine Zone collaborated on a massively multiplayer online role-playing game for mobile devices based on the content of XV, first released on June 28, 2017. Titled Final Fantasy XV: A New Empire and developed by Machine Zone's subsidiary Epic Action, the game involves players taking the role of characters from XV and fighting other player armies in real-time battles for control of the Crystal.

A remake tailored to mobile devices titled Final Fantasy XV: Pocket Edition was also released in 2017. Released for iOS, Android and through Windows Store, it carries over the core story and gameplay while using a different artstyle and touch controls catered to a casual gaming audience. The story plays out across ten episodes; the first episode is free, while the rest must be purchased separately. The game was later released as Final Fantasy XV: Pocket Edition HD for the PlayStation 4 and Xbox One on September 7, 2018, and for the Nintendo Switch on September 13. The Switch version was the first Final Fantasy to appear on the platform. A virtual reality-based fishing simulation game titled Monster of the Deep: Final Fantasy XV was released in November 2017. Suggested by Sony Interactive Entertainment and originally a first-person shooter featuring Prompto and based on the storyline of Episode Duscae, the project was reworked into its current form to promote immersion and entertainment.

=== Downloadable content ===
Among the DLC released were various promotional content utilised as tie-ins to the base game, as well as character-driven "episodes" with additional story elements intended to address player criticisms of the game's narrative structure and missing details. Episode Gladiolus was released on March 28, 2017; featuring Gladiolus as a playable character, the scenario also featured recurring Final Fantasy character Gilgamesh. Following his defeat by Ravus Nox Fleuret, Gladiolus leaves the party to grow his strength under Cor Leonis' guidance while challenging Gilgamesh. Episode Prompto was released on June 27; featuring Prompto as a playable character and taking place during a late-game narrative gap while Prompto left the party, the gameplay shifts towards third-person shooting and stealth-based mechanics. Episode Ignis was released on December 13; set following a key story event, the episode follows Ignis as he teams up with supporting character Ravus Nox Fleuret to protect Noctis. Episode Ignis was planned to be the last installment of post-release DLC. Due to popular demand, the team decided to extend DLC support into 2018, focusing on content to expand character stories and the world's lore.

Comrades is an expansion that allows online multiplayer battles with up to four players. It takes place in the ten-year gap in the game's narrative, focusing on player-created members of the Kingsglaive combating powerful monsters. With the release of Comrades, Final Fantasy XV became the first mainline single-player game in the series to feature multiplayer content. A standalone version of "Comrades" was released on December 13, 2018. Episode Ardyn was released on March 26, 2019. Set thirty years prior to the main game, Episode Ardyn details how Ardyn was found by Niflheim and began his plot of revenge against the Lucis bloodline. Episode Ardyn marks the end of post-release support for Final Fantasy XV.

=== The Dawn of the Future ===
Episode Ardyn was to be part of a four-episode scenario dubbed The Dawn of the Future, with three episodes focusing on Noctis, Lunafreya and supporting character Aranea Highwind. The Dawn of the Future was to expand upon the base narrative and offer a new scenario where the group defy their predetermined fates to create an ideal future. Due to Tabata's decision to leave and subsequent changes within the development team, all but Episode Ardyn were cancelled in November of that year. Instead, the scrapped content and Episode Ardyn were turned into the novel Final Fantasy XV: The Dawn of the Future, written for long-term fans of the game to provide closure for the project and its universe. The novel was written by Emi Nagashima, who had written supplementary materials for Final Fantasy XIII and Nier Automata, based on the DLC draft. The novel was released in Japan in April 2019. An English version was released in June 2020 through Square Enix Books & Manga, a publishing imprint of Square Enix created in partnership with Penguin Random House.
