= Noctis Lucis Caelum =

Final Fantasy XV character

- Final Fantasy character
- Noctis wielding the Engine Blade, as drawn by Tetsuya Nomura for Dissidia Final Fantasy NT.
- First appearance: Brotherhood: Final Fantasy XV (2016)
- First game: Final Fantasy XV (2016)
- Created by: Tetsuya Nomura
- Designed by: Tetsuya Nomura; Hiromu Takahara; Yusuke Naora
- Voiced by: English: Ray Chase Hyrum Hansen (child); Japanese: Tatsuhisa Suzuki Miyuki Satō (child)
- Motion capture: Takuma Harada

Noctis Lucis Caelum (Japanese: ノクティス・ルシス・チェラム, Hepburn: Nokutisu Rushisu Cheramu), "Noct" (ノクト, Nokuto) for short, is a character from Square Enix's Final Fantasy video game series. Noctis is a playable character and the main protagonist of Final Fantasy XV, which was originally a spin-off titled Final Fantasy Versus XIII. The crown prince and protector of Lucis, Noctis must reclaim his country's Crystal from the empire of Niflheim, going on a journey to become the True King of legend and save his world from darkness. Noctis has also appeared in the game's expanded media, Final Fantasy crossover titles and other games, including Puzzle & Dragons and Tekken 7.

Noctis was created and co-designed by Tetsuya Nomura, with later revisions by Yusuke Naora. Nomura initially created Noctis based on Versus XIII's planned tragic story, wanting a leading character unlike others in the Final Fantasy series. Hiromu Takahara, lead designer for Japanese fashion house Roen, designed Noctis' clothes to be asymmetric, mirroring the fashion house's trademark style, and indicative of the game's themes and atmosphere. Before his design was finalized, Noctis was given a story-inspired, temporary outfit that was used in early trailers. His portrayal in the final game was influenced by his two voice actors, Tatsuhisa Suzuki (Japanese) and Ray Chase (English).

Early comments on Noctis generally compared him to earlier Final Fantasy protagonists. His portrayal in the final game met with positive responses, with many journalists noting his growth during the story and contrasted him with other Final Fantasy protagonists. His appearances in the expanded media of Final Fantasy XV and other games have prompted varied responses.

== Creation and development ==
Noctis in the Final Fantasy Versus XIII trailer from 2006; the placeholder outfit was designed based on the game's script.

Noctis Lucis Caelum was created and designed by Tetsuya Nomura, the original director of Final Fantasy XV, which was originally titled Final Fantasy Versus XIII and set within the Fabula Nova Crystallis Final Fantasy project. Nomura created Noctis both as a vessel for communicating the planned tragic tone of Versus XIII, and a traditional fantasy sword user in an otherwise-modern world. His full name loosely translates from Latin into "Light of [the] Night Sky"; his nickname Noct translates as "of the Night". Nomura had not wanted to use a weather or sky based name, but opted for it after Lightning, the main protagonist of Final Fantasy XIII, was given a weather-based name. The name also referenced Sora, the main protagonist of the Kingdom Hearts series; Sora and Caelum both mean "sky" in Japanese and Latin respectively

The character's clothing was designed by Hiromu Takahara, the main designer at Japanese fashion house Roen. Takahara's key inspiration for the clothing's style and coloring was "jet black", representing the game's atmosphere. Takahara used an asymmetrical style common to Roen's clothing lines. His outfit was designed to make Noctis look as though he went to a high-class public house. Roen created a set of real clothes and kept them in the office for reference by the developers; Nomura had been constantly asked by graphic artists which materials his characters' outfits were made from. When the game was first revealed, Noctis wore a temporary outfit while his final look was being created. The character's temporary clothing was based on the game's script to give a visual impression in trailers. Takahara also designed a formal suit for Noctis, which he wears in the original opening section of the game. All Roen designs, including Noctis' suit, were retained when Versus XIII was rebranded as Final Fantasy XV because the team felt the looks should not be changed.

While the game changed names, platforms and eventually directors, Nomura worked with Hajime Tabata to ensure Noctis remained as unchanged as possible in the final product. Art co-director Yusuke Naora supervised changes to his character model. The main goal was to make Noctis appear realistic, with blemishes on his face. Another major goal was keeping the same character impression while making adjustments and enhancements because series fans already had a concept of the character. His hair shadow effects needed to be adjusted after an upgrade in technology so they did not cast too much shade on his face, while the hairstyle was kept consistent. His hairstyle was meant to look ordered from the front, but wild from the rear. To make his hair movements realistic, the team worked with a professional hairstylist to create the design using a mannequin's wig, then used Luminous Engine to render it in real-time—a technique that was first used in the 2012 tech demo Agni's Philosophy.

Noctis' growth was a core part of the game's story, representing the theme of the father-son relationship (Noctis's father Regis Lucis Caelum pictured on the left).

Noctis's aging during the course of Final Fantasy XV was a major departure from typical Japanese role-playing game protagonists. The developers made the change despite fearing a poor reception from fans; Tabata said it "felt that it was important in communicating [the party's] development and wanting to express it in a way that we only can with the current generation of consoles". Designing Noctis' older facial features, the team used photographs of war veterans and actors to add fine details and mature the character's expressions. His features were designed to be similar to his father Regis Lucis Caelum, reflecting the game's theme of the father-son relationship. Noctis' older appearance was designed by Naora. A version of Noctis was incorporated into a new post-game version of the Yoshitaka Amano-designed logo. The logo was included based on a request by Noctis's Japanese voice actor to include the character. This combined logo was described as representing both the beginning of a new journey, and the game's development history.

Speaking after the reveal of Versus XIII, Nomura said the team focused on developing the then-unnamed protagonist's weaponry, later dubbed the Engine Blade (エンジンブレード, Enjin Burēdo). The trailer portrayed Noctis in an "overpowered" state, with Nomura's draft for Versus XIII having a weakened Noctis collecting weapons. Noctis was originally one of four controllable characters in Versus XIII, and was reworked as the sole playable character in Final Fantasy XV. Early in the game's development, Noctis was the only character in Eos who could use magic, which would not have worked from a gameplay standpoint. The team then reworked the gameplay so that Noctis' companions could also use magic.

Gameplay elements carried over from Versus XIII to XV included Noctis's ability to warp across battlefields, and his "Armiger" power to summon multiple weapons into battle. Another feature carried over was Noctis's eyes changing colour from blue to red during some story and gameplay scenes related to magic. His powers were originally associated with Etro, a goddess in the Fabula Nova Crystallis subseries. After changing to a mainline entry, the game dropped the subseries's deities and terminology while maintaining thematic elements. A ring later known as the Ring of the Lucii (光耀の指輪, Kōyō no Yubiwa; lit. "Ring of Radiant Light") was established early on and became central to the game's story; his gloves were described as being for "design purposes".

=== Personality ===
Nomura did not want Noctis to have a personality like Squall Leonhart or Cloud Strife, the respective protagonists of Final Fantasy VIII and VII, defining their personality type as that of "a silent, gloomy little boy". Nomura wanted to create a realistic character type that had not yet been seen in the Final Fantasy. Nomura was wary of this approach because Noctis was a new character that might fall "out of bounds". Nomura wanted Noctis to have "an overabundance of idiosyncrasy" so he would leave an impression on the player. Nomura also wanted the character to perform actions that bore both heroic and villainous traits, feeling that an anti-hero protagonist would fit the game's themes. Noctis initially hid his shyness under a cold exterior, through which his close friends can see. A key scene in Versus XIII that demonstrated his personality was his first meeting with Stella Nox Fleuret, the game's original female lead.

Describing his wishes for the character in an interview, Tabata said he wanted players to immerse themselves in Noctis' character by learning about the world and story from his point of view. The choice of the game's theme song, a cover of Ben E. King's "Stand by Me" by Florence and the Machine, was meant as a message of gratitude from Noctis, which he is unable to express in words. According to Tabata, Noctis' cool mannerisms and reserved exterior stem from his lonely childhood and a fear of losing those closest to him. His words and actions stem from a fear of disappointing those around him, causing him to work to fulfill expectations and bring people happiness.

As Noctis and Regis do not interact much in-game, their connection is represented by the Regalia, a car Noctis uses to travel Eos. Tabata drew on childhood memories of drives with his father. When comparing the personalities of Noctis and the game's heroine Lunafreya Nox Fleuret, Tabata called Noctis the weaker of the two. Noctis' transition from prince to king is a key part of the narrative. According to scenario writer Saori Itamuro, Noctis was meant to face his future with both dread and acceptance, having been raised to expect such an event. This part of his story influenced aspects of his appearance. According to the developers, the rivalry between Noctis and Ardyn Izunia is unusual in the franchise because the two initially are on friendly terms despite the development of their hatred for each other.

=== Voice actors and localization ===
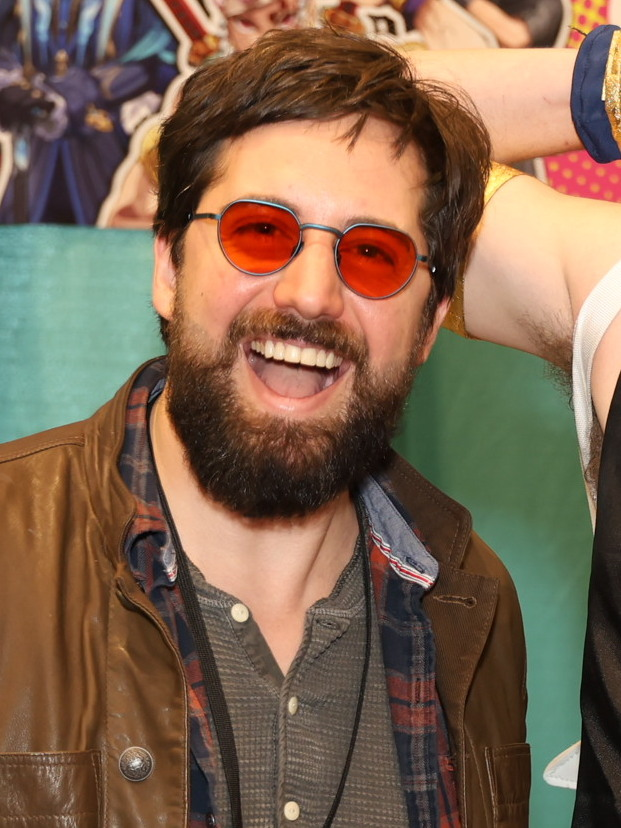
Ray Chase voices Noctis in the English localization

Tatsuhisa Suzuki voiced Noctis, with Miyuki Satō portraying him as a child. Suzuki was cast in 2009, seven years before the game's final release, when the project still had the Versus XIII name. During early recording sessions, Suzuki portrayed Noctis as an introvert, speaking with a gruff manner and showing little sympathy for those beyond his immediate circle. When the project was retitled Final Fantasy XV, Suzuki worked with the production team to create a new persona for Noctis, who became more outgoing and emotional. Suzuki recorded his lines for the game with the rest of the main cast. Suzuki modeled Noctis' persona on the stage mannerisms of singer Kurt Cobain. While he did not do continuous work on the game due to the production's "twists and turns", he found himself constantly keeping Noctis in mind so he could easily portray him in recording sessions. According to Suzuki, some of the recordings he made for Versus XIII were used in XV. When voicing Noctis in the anime Brotherhood: Final Fantasy XV, Suzuki talked with the main cast about their combined performances, establishing a good rapport with them.

Noctis is voiced in English by Ray Chase, with Hyrum Hansen voicing him as a child. Speaking about his role, Chase was told to make a performance that would resonate with Western audiences rather than create an English version of the Japanese performance, resulting in Noctis' English version being noticeably different from the Japanese one. Noctis was Chase's first Final Fantasy character and his first lead role in a video game project. He was initially shocked when he was told what character he would be voicing. While there were efforts to have group recording sessions for the cast, these were dropped due to technical and financial difficulties. The game's opening scene, in which Noctis sets out on his journey, is the only one that was recorded with the lead voice actors in a group session. Localization director Dan Inoue's English-language interpretation of the character is based by Suzuki's influence. Inoue avoided what he called the "emo" role-playing stereotype for the character. To keep the main group's dialogue natural, Inoue created a character relationship chart to maintain stylistic consistency.

English voice for the 2015 game demo Episode Duscae were done in a hurry without much checking before going into the ROM-checking stage. While Tabata felt the performance was wrong, an opinion reflected in player feedback after the demo's release, it was too late to re-record. Tabata said the original performance made the character sound too old, comparing it negatively to Batman. Based on feedback, the voice work was redone to show the character's youth and charm, along with his "sense of ennui". Due to the feedback from Episode Duscae, recasting Noctis was considered, but instead Chase worked with the localization team to find a different voice for Noctis. After putting together a demo reel of Chase performing a variety of lines, Tabata chose the one he thought best suited the character. According to Chase, the most emotional part of the original recording was Noctis's final farewell to his comrades during a post-credit scene, which for him symbolized saying goodbye to the localization team. Noctis's scene on his throne at the end of the game needed re-recording; originally sounding on the point of tears, the dialogue was re-recorded to emphasize Noctis's resolve.

== Appearances ==
=== Final Fantasy XV ===
Noctis is the only child and heir of King Regis Lucis Caelum CXIII of Lucis. The Caelum dynasty safeguards the Crystal, an artifact connected to the Astrals, god-like protectors for the world of Eos. When he was five years old, the Crystal chose Noctis as the "True King", a prophesied figure who would purge Eos of the Starscourge, a plague that will trigger eternal darkness on Eos and turn living things into monstrous Daemons. At eight years old, Noctis is attacked by a Daemon and is sent to the nation of Tenebrae for healing, where he meets and bonds with its princess Lunafreya. Noctis and Regis are forced to flee Tenebrae when it is attacked by the Niflheim Empire. By the time of the events of Final Fantasy XV, Niflheim has besieged Lucis and Regis agrees to a ceasefire. As part of the treaty, Noctis will marry Lunafreya; Regis dispatches him to Altissia where they are to be married. Following Noctis' departure, Niflheim attacks Lucis' capital Insomnia, steals the Crystal, and kills Regis. Noctis, with his companions and sworn protectors Gladiolus Amicitia, Prompto Argentum, and Ignis Scientia, set out on a quest to retrieve the Crystal and defeat Niflheim.

To fulfill his role, Noctis collects the Royal Arms—weapons of the ancient Lucian monarchs—from tombs across Lucis, and gains the blessing of the Astrals. He is in turn aided remotely by Lunafreya, and in person by her attendant Gentiana, and Niflheim's chancellor Ardyn. Ardyn is later revealed to be Ardyn Lucis Caelum, the immortal older brother of Noctis's ancestor Somnus, who sought to destroy both the Crystal and Somnus's bloodline after being corrupted by the Starscourge. Noctis gains the favor of the Astrals Titan and Ramuh, but Ardyn mortally wounds Lunafreya and disrupts the ritual to summon Leviathan. The dying Lunafreya helps Noctis subdue the rampaging Leviathan before giving him the Ring of the Lucii, an artifact through which he can access the Crystal's magic. Burdened by the death of Lunafreya and tormented by Ardyn, Noctis heads for Niflheim's capital Gralea.

Arriving in Gralea to find its population turned into Daemons, Noctis finds and is pulled into the Crystal, where he learns from the Astral Bahamut of the Providence ritual, where Noctis will sacrifice himself to use the combined power of the Crystal and the Astrals to destroy the Starscourge. Ten years later, Noctis awakens and reunites with his companions; they travel to Insomnia where they defeat the rogue Astral Ifrit and the enslaved Lucii before facing Ardyn. After defeating Ardyn in the physical world, Noctis sacrifices himself to fulfill his role as the True King, destroying Ardyn's spirit in the afterlife with the aid of the Lucii. In the game's mid-credits and post-credit scenes, Noctis says his goodbyes to his friends during a rest before the final battle, and reunites with Lunafreya in the afterlife.

=== Final Fantasy XV-related appearances ===
Noctis is one of the main characters in Brotherhood: Final Fantasy XV, an original net animation that follows his early life and the story of his companions. In the opening and concluding episodes, Noctis learns of the fall of Lucis and faces the Daemon that nearly killed him in his youth. The first and last episodes tie into the events of Platinum Demo: Final Fantasy XV, a free tech demo showing Noctis' journey through a dreamworld during the near-death experience following the Daemon's attack. The game Final Fantasy XV: Pocket Edition features a chibi Noctis as a playable character. Noctis briefly appears as a young child in a wheelchair in the 2016 CGI film Kingsglaive, and during a post-credits scene at the beginning of his journey. He is also featured as a character in a manga anthology of stories based on the world of Final Fantasy XV. A King's Tale, which is set thirty years before the game's events, follows the exploits of Regis being told to a young Noctis as a fairy tale. He also features as a character in the virtual reality title Monster of the Deep, and the mobile spin-off Final Fantasy XV: A New Empire.

Noctis would have been the central character of a planned downloadable content (DLC) episode Episode Noctis: The Final Strike, the finale of a planned tetralogy of DLC episodes that were titled Dawn of the Future. The first installment, Episode Ardyn, was published but the remaining episodes were canceled. Noctis plays a minor role in Episode Ignis, in which the title character protects him from danger and can create an alternative ending in which Noctis remains as the living king after Ignis defeats Ardyn. In Episode Prompto, Noctis expresses his guilt over being tricked by Ardyn into attacking Prompto, and plays a small role in Episode Gladios.

The canceled DLC was used as the basis for the novel Final Fantasy XV: The Dawn of the Future, which begins with an alternative ending to Episode Ardyn. In The Dawn of the Future, Noctis enters the Crystal and learns the truth behind Ardyn's past and Lunafreya's role. Outside, Ardyn has defied his role, and Bahamut resurrects Lunafreya to gather power for an attack that will purge Eos of life. Noctis rebels against Bahamut, allowing Ardyn to complete the ritual of Providence in his place. While Ardyn destroys Bahamut's spiritual self, Noctis destroys Bahamut's physical form and saves Lunafreya. With both the Starscourge and magic gone from the world, the population sets about rebuilding and Noctis marries Lunafreya.

=== Other appearances ===
Noctis appears as a guest character in Itadaki Street: Dragon Quest and Final Fantasy 30th Anniversary, was featured as ability card in the mobile game Mobius Final Fantasy among other XV characters, and as a playable character in the mobile Final Fantasy Brave Exvius titles, an obtainable playable character in Final Fantasy Record Keeper, and in the Dissidia fighting game crossovers Dissidia NT and Opera Omnia. For Dissidia, Noctis's appearance was delayed until after the launch of Final Fantasy XV. Noctis' original costume created by Nomura for the first trailers of Versus XIII is available as DLC for Dissidia NT. He was later featured in a limited time quest in Final Fantasy XIV with associated items, and as a character in the rhythm game spin-off Theatrhythm Final Bar Line. Different depictions of the character also feature in the Final Fantasy Trading Card Game.

Outside Final Fantasy, Noctis appears as a DLC character in Bandai Namco's fighting game Tekken 7; in-game he is portrayed as a friend of Lars Alexandersson. Tekken series producer Katsuhiro Harada commented it was his idea to include Noctis within the game, resurrecting old concepts for a series crossover dating back to the original PlayStation era. Harada wanted to surprise fans by including an RPG character in a fighting game; he sought permission from Tabata to feature him in Namco's game. The developers wanted to emulate Noctis' techniques from Final Fantasy XV with their own hardware, and was designed to be accessible to Tekken series newcomers. They received a model to follow from Square Enix. Besides Noctis' regular costume, he wears an original hooded outfit designed by the Namco staff. More alternative outfits were designed by Square Enix staff. Noctis was featured in a collaboration with Puzzle & Dragons. Bkub Okawa, author of the comedy manga Pop Team Epic, parodied Noctis and Ignis as super deformed designs. The Engine Blade also appears for 2B to wield in Nier Automata, and he was included as a skin in Minecraft.

== Reception ==
=== Critical response ===
Prior to the game's release, Noctis saw varied commentary from journalists. Once Final Fantasy XV was revealed in 2013, Todd Ciolek from Anime News Network described Noctis as "your standard-issue brash anime kid in demeanor." Daniella Lucas from GamesRadar compared him to Squall based on his portrayed rebellious attitude. In an early review of Episode Duscae, GameSpot's Alexa Ray Corriae praised the interactions between Noctis and his companions, citing them as a good example of deep platonic love between men. Several critics enjoyed Noctis's portrayal in Brotherhood, highlighting how the relationships with his friends were portrayed.

Following the release of Final Fantasy XV, critical response to Noctis was more positive. Game Informer writer Andrew Reiner referred to Noctis as a "great leader" and "an interesting, conflicted character, torn between his duties to the kingdom and wanting a different life". David Roberts of GamesRadar enjoyed the game's focus on Noctis and his companions, while also noting their disproportionate screen time compared to the rest of the cast. Eurogamer's Malindy Hetfeld compared him to Final Fantasy X protagonist Tidus because both become more likable as gameplay continues. Despite criticising the lack of explanation about Noctis's motivations, EGMNOW's Mollie L. Patterson praised the character's growth from adolescence and his older design. Graham Day of Escapist Magazine regarded him as one of the franchise's most complex characters due to the way he completes his duties as king. Anime News Network's Dustin Bailey praised the interactions between Noctis and his friends, saying "Noctis' brooding silence" makes some scenes feel realistic. Chris Carter of Destructoid compared Noctis and his allies to the cast of Final Fantasy VI, a highly acclaimed title of the franchise, but found Noctis overpowered.

A frequent point of criticism among game journalists was the portrayal of Noctis's relationship with Lunafreya, which was seen as underdeveloped due to Lunafreya's minimal presence in-game. In contrast to this, Salvatore Pane of Paste Magazine regarded Noctis' failure to save Lunafreya as one of the character's strongest reactions because of his grief being expressed through silent tears. Philip Kollar of Polygon described the ending as emotionally fulfilling for Noctis, while Alex Donaldson of VG247 positively compared the final conflict between Noctis and Ardyn to that between Cloud and his nemesis Sephiroth. Noctis' role in The Dawn of the Future divided opinions due to its thematic relation to the original game, but the exploration of Noctis' romance with Lunafreya was praised and contrasted with the game. In his review of A King's Tail, Jacob Hill of Push Square felt the game further expanded upon Noctis' personality and his relationship with Regis, who lacked development in the series' other media.

Noctis's introduction into Tekken 7 saw multiple reactions. Brendan Caldwell of Rock, Paper, Shotgun found him fitting based on Noctis' and the rest of the cast's skills. while writers for Engadget and PC Gamer felt that Noctis did not make a good fit for the Tekken world. Sam Prell of GamesRadar noted Noctis's inclusion in Tekken 7 as part of a trend for unconventional fictional crossovers with fighting game franchises. Carter enjoyed Noctis' inclusion in Dissidia NT, saying he fit in with the cast of previous Final Fantasy heroes.

=== Popularity ===
A Play Arts Kai figurine of Noctis was developed and a fragrance was created in the character's image. An internet meme also emerged focusing on Noctis and his friends in the Regalia looking at electronically edited images was developed; Square Enix producer Shinji Hashimoto found the meme comical and motivated fans to produce more to increase interest in Final Fantasy XV. In a 2020 NHK poll, Noctis was voted the 14th-best Final Fantasy character. In 2016, Battleborn artist Scott Kester did an homage to Final Fantasy XV in the form of an artwork of Noctis and Batteborn character Phoebe.

In a 2017 Famitsu poll, Noctis was voted as the most-wanted character fans expect to appear in Square Enix's franchise Kingdom Hearts. For the game Kingdom Hearts III, a new character named Yozora made cameo appearances in the base game and appeared as a boss in the Re: Mind DLC; Kotaku's Heather Alexandra noted many similarities between Yozora and how Noctis appeared in the Versus XIII trailers. When asked about similarities between Noctis and Yozora, Nomura stated while there are several similarities between the two characters, they are not connected.
