= Monster of the Deep: Final Fantasy XV =

2017 video game

- Developer: Square Enix Business Division 2
- Publisher: Square Enix
- Director: Masashi Takizawa
- Producer: Hajime Tabata
- Designer: Wan Hazmer
- Writers: Takumi Nishida; Ryosuke Katsura; Marie Iwanaga; Kenichi Kimura
- Composers: Tetsuya Shibata; Yoshino Aoki
- Series: Final Fantasy
- Platform: PlayStation 4
- Release: November 21, 2017
- Genre: Simulation
- Mode: Single-player

Monster of the Deep: Final Fantasy XV (Note: Monsutā obu za Dīpu: Fainaru Fantajī Fifutīn (Japanese: モンスター オブ ザ ディープ: ファイナルファンタジーXV)) is a downloadable virtual reality (VR) simulation video game developed and published by Square Enix for the PlayStation 4's PlayStation VR peripheral. The game was released on November 21, 2017. It forms part of the multimedia project surrounding the 2016 video game Final Fantasy XV. Players interact with the four main characters of Final Fantasy XV while taking part in fishing around a variety of locations.

VR-based content for Final Fantasy XV was under consideration for some time. Monster of the Deep was the first VR-based video game developed by Square Enix. The project's initial form was a first-person shooter add-on to the main game, with a demo being created for E3 2016 around this premise. The game was changed into a fishing simulation due to the latter's higher level of immersion. While praised for its graphics and for including characters from Final Fantasy XV, the game was often called simplistic in its gameplay and glitchy in its controls.

== Premise and gameplay ==
The players view in virtual reality as character Noctis Lucis Caelum gestures toward them.

Monster of the Deep: Final Fantasy XV, a virtual reality (VR) simulation game, takes place within Eos, an Earth-like fantasy world that serves as the setting for the 2016 role-playing game Final Fantasy XV. The player takes on the role of a fisherman who just happens to be fishing right where several of the protagonists of Final Fantasy XV are also fishing. The player character interacts with Noctis Lucis Caelum and his three companions, fish together in ponds, hunting and catching various fish. Once three fish are caught, a battle takes place with the titular "monster", a powerful fish which can attack the player and end the game. After defeating the monster, the game ends with the player having a dinner of fish with Noctis and his friends.

As a VR-based experience, players have a 360 degree view of their surroundings. Players can control the game with either a PlayStation DualShock 4 controller or two PlayStation Move controllers. The player controls a fish finding sonar with their left hand and the fishing pole in their right hand. Controls also simulate retracting the fishing line and the pulling in of the line once a fish is caught.

== Development ==
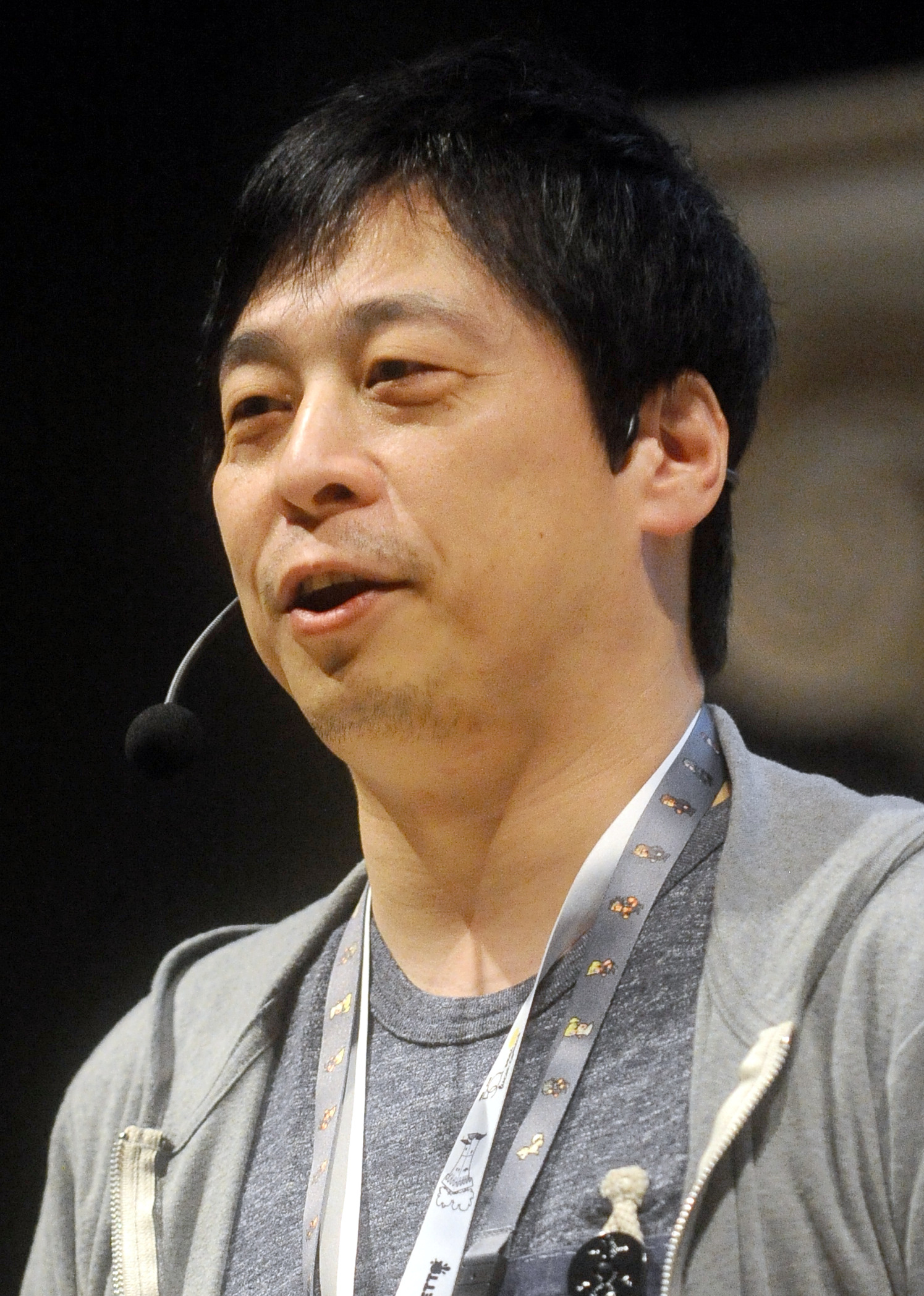
Final Fantasy XV director Hajime Tabata worked as producer in Monster of the Deep.

Monster of the Deep forms part of "Final Fantasy XV Universe", a multimedia project based around Final Fantasy XV that includes additional story episodes, a feature film, and original net animation: the story of Final Fantasy XV was large enough to have covered several games, but as the team did not want to create any additional games, they decided to produce additional media. XV and its associated media likewise hold a thematic connection to Fabula Nova Crystallis Final Fantasy, a compilation of games and associated media sharing a common mythos while boasting unconnected stories and settings. While distanced from the Fabula Nova Crystallis brand for marketing purposes, the world of XV still uses its mythos and design elements. Unlike most of the other "Final Fantasy XV Universe" content—which came prior to the game's release—Monster of the Deep was planned for release in the year following, forming part of Square Enix's dedicated post-launch content plan.

VR-based content had been tested for the main game for the game's passive moments, but it was discarded as it would require wearing a VR headset for hours. Speaking in an interview in June 2016, Final Fantasy XV's director Hajime Tabata said that the VR content was first suggested by Sony Interactive Entertainment for their in-development PlayStation VR. The team was initially reluctant, but after experiencing the VR headset for themselves, they agreed to the collaboration. Monster of the Deep was the first time Square Enix had developed VR-based content. The original version of the VR game was a first-person shooter scenario featuring party member Prompto Argentum. Retelling the events of the 2015 commercial demo Final Fantasy XV: Episode Duscae, it was originally announced as downloadable content for the main game. The narrative and structure of Episode Duscae needed to be redone due to the nature of VR gaming and the clashing of mechanics with what the main game had become. At the time, the team was also considering similar content featuring the other party members.

Monster of the Deep was the first time Square Enix had developed VR-based content. Following the initial reveal of the VR prototype, according to director Masashi Takizawa, the project was reassessed and it was decided that the shooter-based mechanics were neither immersive nor entertaining enough, in addition to requiring a much longer development period. The fishing simulation would allow them to achieve both, so the VR game's content was reworked. According to the game's lead designer Wan Hazmer, the team went on a fishing trip to Yokohama Bay with Kazuaki Iwasawa, the character supervisor for Kingsglaive: Final Fantasy XV due to his experience with fishing—this was so the team could gain authentic experience that they could put into the game.

== Release ==
The game was first announced at the 2016 Electronic Entertainment Expo. While its initial announcement inferred that the entire game of Final Fantasy XV would be made playable on the PlayStation VR, it was later clarified that the playable VR content was limited to the shooting side game. As such, its release date went from alongside the regular version of Final Fantasy XV on September 30, 2016, to "unlikely to release alongside the game" to "sometime after September 30" and even missing the October launch of PlayStation VR as well. The game was not given a new release date after the main game's delay to November 29, but was initially planned to be released as free downloadable content (DLC) for the main game. The project was re-revealed under its current title at E3 2017. Rather than the original plan to have been released as downloadable content to Final Fantasy XV itself, the game is a standalone project that can be played without needing to own the original. The game was ultimately released on November 21 the same year.

== Reception ==
=== Pre-release ===
Speaking of the initial 2016 demo, Griffin McElroy of Polygon sharply criticized it for being too simplistic, stating that it stood out among games at the PlayStation VR event as not being one of the games that was particularly fun. Patrick Klepek of Kotaku agreed, saying that the games simplicity meant that the virtual reality aspect was barely utilized, and the experience became more about punching buttons to win. Andrew Webster of The Verge notes that the Final Fantasy aspects of the game felt shallow and was more like an arcade shooting game such as House of the Dead. Jeff Grubb of VentureBeat went as far as to call it "the worst VR game from a professional studio", also citing the concern that it was too much like a simple arcade shooter.

Some critics did get a positive first impression however, such as Meghan Sullivan of IGN who was generally impressed with it despite conceding simplistic gameplay, citing a sense of immersion and nostalgia impossible to feel without virtual reality, concluding that "...I began to tear up with happiness. This was my first taste of VR, and although I knew I wasn't really in a car, driving down a road in a world where Behemoths dwell and humans can magically teleport, just for a few minutes, it felt like I was".

=== Post-release ===
Reception

Aggregate score
Aggregator	Score
Metacritic	62/100

Review scores
Publication	Score
Destructoid	7/10
Edge	4/10
GameRevolution	3/5
PlayStation Official Magazine – UK	5/10
Hardcore Gamer	1.5/5

The final retail release saw "mixed to average reviews" from critics, with review aggregate site Metacritic giving it a score of 62 out of 100. While the visuals met with general appeal, most other aspects met with a mixed response. The controls were frequently faulted due to glitches and awkward elements.

Chris Carter of Destructoid enjoyed the game, though admitting a bias due to enjoying the fishing minigame from Final Fantasy XV, saying it knew its particular player niche. Game Revolution's Jason Faulkner had difficulty playing the game due to issues with its two control options, also noting distracting graphical glitches, but called it a solid VR experience. PlayStation Official Magazine – UK praised the game's visuals, but faulted most of the other elements including gameplay and premise. Edge Magazine was fairly negative about the title, commenting that its elements are "all a little rote - something we certainly don't associate with Final Fantasy". Hardcore Gaming's Cory Wells was highly critical, calling the visuals the game's only good quality amid frequent control issues and poor game design.
