= Final Fantasy XV: Pocket Edition =

2018 video game

- Developers: Square Enix; XPEC Entertainment; SummerTimeStudio
- Publisher: Square Enix
- Directors: Takahito Ebato; Takahiro Murakami; Farl Lee
- Producers: Kosei Ito; Takahiro Murakami; Hajime Tabata
- Designers: Al Yang; Aimee Kuo; Wayda Chen
- Artist: Yuchi Chin
- Composer: Yoko Shimomura
- Engine: Unity
- Platforms: Android, iOS, Windows 10, PlayStation 4, Xbox One, Nintendo Switch
- Release: Android, iOS; February 8, 2018; Windows 10; June 6, 2018; PlayStation 4, Xbox One; September 7, 2018; Nintendo Switch; September 13, 2018
- Genre: Action role-playing
- Mode: Single-player

Final Fantasy XV: Pocket Edition (Note: Fainaru Fantajī Fifutīn: Poketto Edishon (Japanese: ファイナルファンタジーXV ポケットエディション)) is a 2018 action role-playing game co-developed by XPEC Entertainment, SummerTimeStudio and publisher Square Enix. The title is an abridged version of the 2016 title Final Fantasy XV, remaking its storyline, graphics, and gameplay for mobile devices. Originally released for Android and iOS, it was later released for Windows 10 through the Microsoft Store, PlayStation 4, Xbox One and Nintendo Switch. The console versions were released under the title Final Fantasy XV: Pocket Edition HD. (Note: Fainaru Fantajī Fifutīn: Poketto Edishon HD (ファイナルファンタジーXV ポケットエディション HD)) Split into ten chapters, the game follows protagonist Noctis Lucis Caelum and his party across the world of Eos, with players navigating semi-linear environments and fulfilling quests to advance the story. The first chapter is available for free, while subsequent chapters must be purchased.

Production began in 2015 following the release of the commercial demo Episode Duscae. Final Fantasy XV director Hajime Tabata acted as co-producer with Kosei Ito, who had worked with Tabata on Before Crisis: Final Fantasy VII. The aim was for a young team to take the story and mechanics of Final Fantasy XV and simplify it for mobile platforms, allowing it to reach a wider casual audience. It was rebuilt using the Unity engine. Reception of Pocket Edition was generally positive, with many outlets praising it as a faithful translation of the original game onto mobile platforms. The mobile version reached three million downloads within a month.

== Content and gameplay ==
A battle in Final Fantasy XV: Pocket Edition; protagonist Noctis Lucis Caelum and his companions fight a boss monster.

Final Fantasy XV: Pocket Edition is a remake of Final Fantasy XV, an action role-playing game originally released for PlayStation 4 and Xbox One in 2016. It acts as an abridged version of the original, preserving its storyline while adjusting the gameplay for its new platforms and streamlining progression. It also drops the original's open world and several of its side quests. The game is divided into ten chapters; the first chapter is available for free, with the remaining nine being able to be purchased individually or as a whole with discounted pricing. The original mobile release used touch controls, while the later console version used standard game controllers.

Players take on the role of protagonist Noctis Lucis Caelum as he explores the ten chapters' environments within the world of Eos with his companions, progressing the story campaign and completing smaller objectives. The game is played from a fixed camera angle, with Noctis being moved around using either direct controller stick-like movement or tapping an area of the environment for automatic movement. Side quests unique to Pocket Edition were added, including treasure hunting and fetch quests. Exploration and combat shifted from a behind the back view to an overhead perspective with simplified controls more suitable for playing on a touchscreen. The original leveling system is carried over in a simplified form, with the party gaining experience points through combat and leveling up when they rest at a camp, gaining Ability Points which unlock new moves and abilities for characters using the Ascension Grid.

== Development ==
Pocket Edition was co-developed by Final Fantasy developer and publisher Square Enix, XPEC Entertainment and Osaka-based SummerTimeStudio. Development began in 2015 following the release of Episode Duscae, the first game demo of Final Fantasy XV. The title was co-produced by Hajime Tabata, the original game's director. Another producer in the project was Kosei Ito, who had worked on Tabata's first major Square Enix project Before Crisis: Final Fantasy VII. The goal of the adaptation was to make Final Fantasy available to more players who didn't own consoles, and to make a version of the game focused on quick gameplay. Tabata chose mobile devices as the initial release platform as he used an iPhone device every day.

The graphics were changed to fit the new hardware and approach. The "chibi"-style character redesigns emerged partially through hardware limitations and partially through the wish to portray a different version of the same narrative. Originally designed to emulate the polygonal character models of Final Fantasy VII, its current art style was chosen instead to appeal to younger gamers. The scenario carried over intact, with the environments and scenes altered to better fit the game's new scale. A focus was placed on the game's central theme of a memorable journey with companions, which helped define the streamlined approach of Pocket Edition.

While the original game was built using the in-house Luminous Engine, Pocket Edition was built using the third-party Unity engine. For Windows devices, due to the Windows 10 Mobile device series being phased out by Microsoft, the team instead focused on the latest generation of game-compatible tablet devices. When speaking with the production team, Tabata asked them to make the gameplay as stress-free as possible, resulting in the automatic gameplay options and streamlined layout and battle system. The modular pricing was chosen over a premium one-off purchase due to that approach being more expected and acceptable on mobile platforms, with the free first chapter being so players could try out the remake without committing to buying any more.

The game was announced at Gamescom in August 2017. It was originally set to be released later that year. The game was released for Android and iOS devices on February 8, 2018, a day earlier than was originally announced. A version for Windows 10 devices was released through the Microsoft Store on June 6. The game was later released as Final Fantasy XV: Pocket Edition HD for the PlayStation 4 and Xbox One on September 7. A port for Nintendo Switch was released on September 13.

== Reception ==
Reception

Aggregate score
Aggregator	Score
Metacritic	iOS: 79/100; PS4: 68/100; NS: 69/100

Review scores
Publication	Score
Destructoid	6.5/10
GameSpot	7/10
Gamezebo	4.5/5
Nintendo Life	6.5/10
Nintendo World Report	7/10
Pocket Gamer	8/10
TouchArcade	5/5

The mobile version of Final Fantasy XV: Pocket Edition received "generally favorable reviews", according to review aggregator Metacritic. The game surpassed over three million downloads within a month.

Mike Fahey of Kotaku called it an "outstanding" abridgment of the original, praising it for allowing players to experience the story without much time commitment. Shaun Musgrave from TouchArcade scored the game at five stars (out of five), commenting on the game's faithful recreation of the game's abridged narrative, with the "voice acting, sound effects, and music" being retained from the console version of Final Fantasy XV being of particular merit. Megan Farokhmanesh of The Verge praised its streamlined gameplay style and redesigned art style, calling it a good entry point into the series as a whole. Polygon's Julia Lee positively noted the preservation of the original story and its redesigned gameplay, but disliked the change in art style.
