= Before Crisis: Final Fantasy VII =

2004 video game

- The logo of Before Crisis: Final Fantasy VII as designed for the original FOMA release.
- Developer: Square Enix
- Publisher: Square Enix
- Director: Hajime Tabata
- Producer: Yukimasa Ito
- Artist: Tetsuya Nomura
- Writers: Sachie Hirano; Kazushige Nojima (scenario director)
- Composer: Takeharu Ishimoto
- Series: Compilation of Final Fantasy VII; Final Fantasy
- Platform: Mobile
- Release: FOMA: JP: September 24, 2004; SoftBank: JP: January 30, 2007; EZweb: JP: April 5, 2007
- Genre: Action role-playing game
- Modes: Single-player, multiplayer

Before Crisis: Final Fantasy VII (Note: Japanese: ビフォア クライシス -ファイナルファンタジーVII-, Hepburn: Bifoa Kuraishisu -Fainaru Fantajī Sebun-) was an action role-playing video game developed by Square Enix and originally released for the FOMA mobile service on September 24, 2004. It was later released for SoftBank Mobile and EZweb in 2007. Before Crisis is a prequel to the 1997 video game Final Fantasy VII and forms part of the Compilation of Final Fantasy VII, a metaseries expanding on and continuing the story established in Final Fantasy VII. It takes place six years prior to the events of Final Fantasy VII and focuses on the adventures of the Turks, a group of covert operatives working for the Shinra Electric Power Company, and their fights against both rebel group AVALANCHE and their corrupt employers.

As the first major Final Fantasy game for mobile devices, Before Crisis was designed as a gameplay and multiplayer experience unique to the platform. It is the first major project directed by Hajime Tabata, who created the initial concept at the request of Tetsuya Nomura for a game that had the Turks as protagonists. The music was composed by Takeharu Ishimoto, originally a sound arranger at Square Enix. It was highly successful upon release, registering 200,000 users and being accessed over one million times. Western critics have generally praised the title, but due to issues involving the capacity of mobile devices in the west, it has not been released outside Japan. The game was eventually shut down in 2018.

Portions of the game's story were retold as a part of the mobile gacha game Final Fantasy VII: Ever Crisis.

== Gameplay ==
A screenshot of Before Crisis showing one of the playable characters (right) and the on-screen display.

Before Crisis is a real-time action role-playing game featuring 2D graphics as the player moves along in a side-scrolling manner. The player begins the game by selecting their character, which can be a man or a woman, along with their name. Gameplay is divided up between several modes of play. "Episode Mode" involves the player playing through the game's main storyline, completing various objectives in order to continue on in the game. "Free Mode" allows players to roam towns and speak with the population. Players can also play extra missions to gain experience points and items, some of which are exclusive to "Free Mode". Characters have hit points and magic points, and can level up upon acquisition of experience, at which point they can equip new weapons and armor. Players can choose to manually attack an enemy during combat or press the action key to automatically attack the nearest enemy.

The "Materia Generation System" allows players to acquire Materia, objects tied to the game's magic system, by taking a picture with their camera phone. The game synthesizes the picture down to its base color. Depending upon the dominant color, lighting, and other factors, the game produces a Materia of a certain type. For example, a dark green picture results in a Bio Materia, while a blue picture results in a Cure Materia. Once acquired, Materia can be leveled up as in Final Fantasy VII. Under certain circumstances, assistance in the form of summoned monsters, recurring figures in the Final Fantasy series, can be called in via the Materia system to deal damage to multiple enemies. Rank Points are awarded during the completion of objectives in all three modes of play. After a certain number of Rank Points have been acquired, special bonuses are unlocked, such as stronger armor and weapons, and extra Materia slots. The player is also given a rank, based upon how long they have been playing the game. The higher their rank, the better the bonuses the player gets.

The game uses an ad hoc online multiplayer feature that enables various actions between players, including trading Materia via email. Players can summon a friend to cast magic by filling the "Materia aid" meter. Up to three players can team up at any one time. "Rescue Mode" is activated if the player is defeated during "Episode Mode", at which point they have the option to restart and lose points, or allow themselves to be imprisoned and wait for other players to rescue them. The player can be rescued while their phone is powered down.

Additions were made after the initial release. In 2006, a fighting arena dubbed "Battle Square" was added. In the "Battle Square", players can either fight other players or AI-controlled enemy units. Victory is determined by which side defeated the other and damage taken during combat. In "Battle Tournament" mode, players can choose to use a handicap: the handicap is determined randomly by a materia slot. Two extra difficulty settings were also added, with players able to switch between these and the normal difficulty in the game menu. "Easy Mode" was released in 2006 and allows the player to auto-evade incoming attacks and reduce damage taken, while "Hard Mode", released in 2007 and meant for advanced users, increases the damage dealt by enemy attacks.

== Synopsis ==
=== Setting and characters ===
Before Crisis is set six years prior to the events of Final Fantasy VII. The world on which Before Crisis is set, called "the Planet" in-game and "Gaia" by game staff, is divided into multiple regions run by a megacorporation called the Shinra Electric Power Company. Shinra uses the energy of the Planet, known as the Lifestream, to power the world, and as such is endangering the Planet and its people. The events of Before Crisis frequently overlap with those of Crisis Core: Final Fantasy VII. The exact setting is shortly after the end of a war between Shinra and the people of Wutai. With Wutai defeated, and the people of the world now dependent on Shinra's energy, the company becomes the dominant economic, military, and political power in the world. Rising against them is AVALANCHE, a rebel group who rightly believe that Shinra's energy extraction is slowly killing the planet.

The playable characters and main protagonists are the Turks, a group of covert operatives working for Shinra. The playable characters in-game are eleven new Turks: ten of them are designated by their weapon or fighting style and their gender, while the eleventh is known as Legend (Male). Their name can be selected by the player. One of the characters, Shuriken (Female), later appears in Crisis Core: Final Fantasy VII under the name "Cissnei". The Turks are led by Verdot, a veteran of the group, and later Tseng, a character who plays an important role in other Final Fantasy VII stories. Their primary antagonists all belong to AVALANCHE. The three important AVALANCHE characters are Elfé, the leader of AVALANCHE and Verdot's daughter; Fuhito, a scientist who acts as the planner for the group; and Shears, AVALANCHE's second-in-command. Multiple characters from Final Fantasy VII make appearances either as cameos or supporting characters, such as protagonists Cloud Strife, Tifa Lockhart, Aerith Gainsborough, and supporting character Zack Fair, as well as antagonists Rufus Shinra, son of the company president, and Sephiroth, a SOLDIER who would go rogue.

=== Plot ===
Before Crisis opens with the trainee Turks on a mission in the city of Midgar to investigate AVALANCHE activities. With help from Reno, AVALANCHE retreat. However, the attack proves to be a diversion for a greater strike at the town of Junon, where President Shinra is set to give a speech. President Shinra is shot, but survives, and calls in Sephiroth. However, it transpires that even the attack on the President was a diversion, and AVALANCHE's real target was a weapon called the Mako Cannon, which they planned to fire at Midgar, destroying the city. Elfé and Sephiroth do battle at the cannon, but the fight ends inconclusively, and AVALANCHE withdraw. AVALANCHE next target Rayleigh, a professor carrying data on the SOLDIER members and their creation. The Turks are sent to protect Rayleigh, accompanied by several Shinra guards, including Cloud. Fuhito, a scientist working for AVALANCHE, is able to corrupt Rayleigh's data when the Turks disobey orders and save Rayleigh instead of protecting the information. Using the SOLDIER data, Fuhito develops an elite unit known as the Ravens, using them to capture two SOLDIERs, Essai and Sebastian. The Turks succeed in rescuing the pair, and are then sent to destroy AVALANCHE, accompanied by Zack. Essai and Sebastian, however, are captured once again, and turned into Ravens. Even though Zack is able to bring them back to their senses, he is unable to save them.

Meanwhile, President Shinra becomes suspicious of the Turks' activities, believing that someone within the organization is leaking sensitive information. He concludes that it must be Verdot, and removes him from command, instead placing the company's security leader Heidegger in charge. In his first operation however, Heidegger nearly destroys Junon, and the President reinstates Verdot. In his first mission back in command, Verdot plans to defeat AVALANCHE. An assault is launched at a Mako Reactor, during which Rufus Shinra is revealed to be the traitor supporting AVALANCHE. He is captured by the Turks and placed under house arrest. At the same time, Shears defects to the Turks in an effort to save the gravely ill Elfé. Verdot discovers that Elfé is his daughter Felicia, whom he thought dead in a botched Shinra operation, and resigns from the Turks. With Elfé continuing to weaken, Fuhito takes over the command of AVALANCHE. It is revealed that a Materia owned by Elfé is Zirconiade, an ancient and powerful summoned monster that Fuhito intends to use to destroy humanity and stop them harming the planet. However, the Materia is broken, and is slowly draining Elfé's life energy. To save her, the four Support Materia must be found. Fuhito holds one, and the Turks and Shears hold another.

Meanwhile, not wanting Rufus' betrayal become known, the President orders the Turks' destruction. Despite this imminent threat, the Turks manage to find two more Support Materia. Under Fuhito's control, the remainder of AVALANCHE is turned into a vicious army of uncontrollable Ravens, and he manages to steal all the materia needed. In the final battle, Fuhito summons Zirconiade, fusing the summon with his own body, and Shears sacrifices himself to save Elfé. Fuhito transforms into a monster, but he is defeated by the Turks. After the battle, Tseng falsely claims that both Verdot and Elfé are dead, so as to protect them from being hunted by Shinra. The Turks are then reorganized, with Tseng reinstated as their immediate leader, but they are now sworn to loyalty to Shinra as part of the bargain for their survival. The original Turks find new lives for themselves in hiding, and are later seen helping in the evacuation of Midgar during the events of Final Fantasy VII.

== Development ==
Before Crisis was created as part of the Compilation of Final Fantasy VII, a multimedia series based in and on the world and characters of Final Fantasy VII. While the film Final Fantasy VII: Advent Children was originally to be the only product of the Compilation, the production team agreed that one title was not enough to explore the world of Final Fantasy VII in full, so more titles were decided upon, including Dirge of Cerberus: Final Fantasy VII and Crisis Core. Before Crisis was originally conceived by Tetsuya Nomura, one of the creative minds behind Final Fantasy VII and the Compilation. His initial idea was simply for a mobile action role-playing game using the mobile network. During pre-production, it was decided to set it within the world of Final Fantasy VII. Hajime Tabata joined at this point. He approached Tabata, who had only recently joined the company's mobile games division, and asked if the division could create a mobile game focused on the Turks. Nomura would end up designing the game's characters. Production began in 2002. It was worked on by a core team of 18 people. Staff from the original game took supervisory roles. The game's title was thought up by Tabata, and would go on to establish a system of letter-based abbreviations used by staff for titles in the Compilation. To help solidify their goal, the staff created a timeline for the world of Final Fantasy VII. Since there was little definite information concerning events prior to Final Fantasy VII, they had a relative amount of creative freedom, including creating an early, more violent incarnation of rebel group AVALANCHE. Although Before Crisis is the second title created for the series, it was the first to be released because Advent Children was delayed during post-production.

Before Crisis was the first original video game developed by Square Enix exclusively for mobile phones, originally released on NTT DoCoMo's FOMA mobile devices, and the first action role-playing game exclusive to the platform. The company's first major mobile title, also in collaboration with NTT DoCoMo, was a remake of the original Final Fantasy. Using lessons learned from the development of the Final Fantasy port, the team worked hard to make Before Crisis a uniquely mobile experience, with gameplay features built to exploit mobile functions such as the camera and network capacity. The camera function used to generate Materia was based on a simple image recognition that specifies the Materia generated based on the picture's general color. One of the challenges during development was to keep the framerate smooth during moments of high action, especially as no two mobiles would have identical components. In addition to these problems were issues with integrating the multiplayer functions, balancing the gameplay for different playstyles, creating a comfortable button layout, and adjusting the amount of content they could include for mobiles while maintaining the desired product quality.

To promote the game, Madhouse created a promotional animation featuring some of the main characters. The original version's beta test started in August 2004. It was released on September 24. Following an announcement at the Tokyo Game Show in 2006, the game was released for two additional Japanese mobile carriers. It was respectively released for SoftBank Mobile and EZweb on January 30 and April 5, 2007 respectively. New logos were created for each release. In 2010, Tabata voiced an interest in fully remaking Before Crisis for the Nintendo 3DS, revamping the narrative delivery and incorporating the ability for a substantial number of players to enter missions. This suggestion was positively received by Nomura and Yoshinori Kitase, but at the time Tabata was busy developing Final Fantasy Type-0 (then Agito XIII) and The 3rd Birthday. Deployment for the SoftBank version ended in June 2015. All versions of the game ended when Square Enix's old mobile services were shut down in 2018.

=== Music ===
The composer for Before Crisis was Takeharu Ishimoto, who would go on to compose music for Crisis Core. Originally joining the company as a music arranger, he was one of many staff who participated in a competition set up by the game developers to find a composer for Before Crisis. His task was to create a piece of music that was related to the world of Final Fantasy VII, but still distinctive. It was one of Ishimoto's first jobs as the main composer for a title. The music of Before Crisis was commercially released along with the music from the original video animation Last Order: Final Fantasy VII in an album titled Before Crisis: Final Fantasy VII & Last Order: Final Fantasy VII Original Soundtrack. The majority of the tracks of the album were composed by Ishimoto, apart from a few reorchestrated themes from VII, the music of which was written by regular Final Fantasy composer Nobuo Uematsu.

=== Localization ===
The game's release in the west was announced at the 2006 Electronic Entertainment Expo, two years after its release in Japan. At the announcement, the localization was said to be "coming along nicely". The stated reason for the delay between the original and projected western release was that mobile phones in the west were not yet advanced enough for the game. One of the things planned for the western release was to bring the entire experience over as quickly as possible, with plans for one to three chapters released each month, and fine-tuning to be done using the planned two-year gap between the original and western releases. It formed part of a push by the company into the western mobile game market. Despite these announcements, no further progress has been made and Before Crisis was never released in the west. The official reason for this, as stated by head of mobile operations Keiji Fujita, was that mobile phones in the west were too low-spec for Before Crisis, which could only run on high-end phones in Japan, making a port impossible. Another possible reason suggested by Fujita was Ito's move from Square Enix to Capcom in 2008, leaving no-one to manage any future localization and porting efforts.

Though the original version of the game has not seen a release outside of Japan, an abridged version of the story was retold as part of the internationally-released mobile gacha game Final Fantasy VII: Ever Crisis. This content was announced in 2021, and released between July and August 2026, prior to the game’s scheduled end of service in October 2026.

== Reception ==
Japanese website ITmedia reviewed the beta version in September 2004. The reviewer enjoyed the experience overall and found communication with other players easy, but found a few faults with the game that they hoped would be resolved later, and generally found the female characters less effective in battle. During its first day of operation, the game registered 200,000 users, making it the best-selling mobile game up until that time, and was accessed 1.6 million times. According to Ito, by 2006, the game was still highly popular in Japan.

Previews and features concerning the game have generally been positive. AnimeFringe commented that the visuals seemed "remarkably good" and praised the game for choosing to reverse the good and bad guy roles, by making the Turks protagonists, and AVALANCHE antagonists. Cara Lee Haslam of RPGamer previewed the game at E3 2006 and was impressed with the graphics for a cell phone game, but was critical to its animation. GameSpot's Bethany Massimilla also previewed the game at E3, calling it "perfectly digestible in delivery", with its use of episodic storytelling that comes in "small bursts in between action periods". She also wrote that the game had "well-defined and detailed character portraits and lean, lanky character models running around the city and mako reactor, which had a simple layout but still looked nice". Massimilla praised the smooth animations, and felt that the controls were easy to learn and were responsive. Additionally, she thought the demo phone's vibrating function, set off when the player receives a call from Tseng, was a subtle detail. Levi Buchanan of IGN was generally positive, praising the dark art style, and finding the short mission-based structure ideal for mobile gameplay. 1UP.com listed the game as one of five classic Japanese mobile games unlikely to come to North America.

Outside its immediate reception, Before Crisis had an effect on other projects within the Final Fantasy series. After the positive reception of Madhouse's animated commercial, they were chosen by Square Enix to animate Last Order. The high popularity of Before Crisis in Japan led indirectly to the creation of Type-0, part of the Fabula Nova Crystallis Final Fantasy subseries and then a title for mobiles.
