= Kingsglaive: Final Fantasy XV =

- Key visual, depicting the central cast

Japanese name
- Kanji: キングスグレイブ ファイナルファンタジーXV
Transcriptions
- Revised Hepburn: Kingusugureibu fainarufantajī XV
- Directed by: Takeshi Nozue
- Screenplay by: Takashi Hasegawa
- Story by: Kazushige Nojima; Saori Itamuro
- Based on: Final Fantasy XV by Square Enix
- Produced by: Larry Sparks; Kosei Ito; Shinji Hashimoto; Hajime Tabata
- Starring: Gō Ayano; Shioli Kutsuna; Tsutomu Isobe
- Edited by: Keiichi Kojima
- Music by: John R. Graham; Yoko Shimomura
- Production companies: Visual Works; Digic Pictures; Image Engine; Marza Animation Planet
- Distributed by: Aniplex
- Release date: July 9, 2016
- Running time: 110 minutes
- Country: Japan
- Languages: Japanese; English
- Box office: US$6.5 million (limited theatrical release)

Kingsglaive: Final Fantasy XV (Japanese: キングスグレイブ ファイナルファンタジーXV, Hepburn: Kingusugureibu: Fainaru Fantajī Fifutīn) is a 2016 Japanese animated fantasy film directed by Takeshi Nozue and scripted by Takashi Hasegawa from a story by Kazushige Nojima and Saori Itamuro. Developed primarily by Square Enix's exclusive CGI studio Visual Works, Kingsglaive is based on the setting and story of the video game Final Fantasy XV, which is thematically connected to the Fabula Nova Crystallis subseries. Kingsglaive: Final Fantasy XV was released theatrically in July 2016 in Japan by Aniplex, and received a limited theatrical run in August in North America by Stage 6 Films. Digital and physical home video versions were released three months later in October, and the film was bundled with different editions of Final Fantasy XV alongside Brotherhood: Final Fantasy XV.

Kingsglaive runs parallel with the events in the beginning of Final Fantasy XV, focusing on Regis Lucis Caelum CXIII, the father of main character Noctis. The main protagonists are from the Kingsglaive, an elite combat corps who share Regis's magical powers and defend the kingdom of Lucis and its Crystal from the invading empire of Niflheim. Faced with continued detrimental conflict, Regis accepts an armistice with Niflheim: as part of the peace treaty, his son must marry Lady Lunafreya Nox Fleuret of the imperial province of Tenebrae. The treaty turns out to be a ruse for Niflheim to invade, and Kingsglaive soldier Nyx Ulric is caught up with Regis and Lunafreya in a battle to secure the future of Lucis. The film's voice cast includes Gō Ayano, Shioli Kutsuna and Tsutomu Isobe in Japanese; and Aaron Paul, Lena Headey and Sean Bean in English.

Kingsglaive was made as part of a planned multimedia expansion of Final Fantasy XV to negate having to develop a series of games using the setting and characters. Beginning production in 2014 by the same team that created Final Fantasy VII: Advent Children (2005), Kingsglaive used discarded concepts from the original version of Final Fantasy XV's story, with the aim being to create a self-contained experience with a dedicated cast and relatable plot. Multiple external studios were brought in to help complete the project within the short development time. Its announcement was delayed to 2016 due to the early reveal of Final Fantasy XV.

Kingsglaive grossed $6.55 million during its limited theatrical run and earned a further $4.5 million in the United States from its DVD and Blu-ray releases. Reception to the film was generally negative, with praise going to the visuals and lead actors' performances, while the story and supporting cast were widely criticized.

== Synopsis ==
=== Setting ===
Kingsglaive takes place on the Earth-like world of Eos, running parallel to the opening events of Final Fantasy XV. The kingdom of Lucis is home to a magical Crystal, given to humanity by the world's deities and used by the ruling Caelum dynasty to defend Lucis from invaders via a magical barrier known as the Wall. The Crystal is kept in a special chamber within the Royal Citadel, its powers only accessible through the hereditary Ring of the Lucii. For centuries, Lucis has been at war with the militaristic and technologically advanced empire of Niflheim, which has conquered the other nations using its Magitek armies.

Lucis's crown city Insomnia is protected from Niflheim by the Kingsglaive—an elite corps made up of immigrants from beyond the city limits with whom the Crystal's power are shared by the ruling monarch Regis Lucis Caelum CXIII. The film opens with Regis accepting a peace treaty with Niflheim: as part of the treaty, Regis must cede the territories around Insomnia to Niflheim and have his son Prince Noctis marry Lunafreya Nox Fleuret, former princess of Tenebrae.

=== Plot ===
During a visit to Tenebrae, Regis and Noctis—who is recuperating from a near-death experience—are targeted for assassination by Niflheim. Tenebrae is subsequently attacked, and in the invasion Queen Sylva is killed by Niflheim's General Glauca. Regis attempts to flee with Lunafreya, but she decides to stay with her brother Ravus; both become subjects under Niflheim's rule.

Twelve years later, the Kingsglaive fight to protect Lucis's borders from attacks by Niflheim's Magitek army and Daemons, unnatural monsters tamed for military use. During one such operation, Nyx Ulric defies his orders to withdraw to rescue his friend Libertus from a Daemon. Regis, whose magic powers the Wall and is growing weaker due to advancing age, accepts Imperial Chancellor Ardyn Izunia's offer of peace. This causes dissension among the Kingsglaive, who feel Regis is abandoning their families. Two days before the treaty is to be signed, Kingsglaive member Crowe is sent on a mission to escort Lunafreya to Altissia to meet Noctis, but is killed en route. Her death causes Libertus to leave the Kingsglaive and join a group of Lucian rebels. At a party dedicated to the signing of the treaty, attended by both Regis and Niflheim's emperor Iedolas Aldercapt, Lunafreya meets with Nyx before being secretly abducted by Glauca. Nyx discovers this and finds that Niflheim has stationed their army outside Insomnia.

Regis agrees to deploy the Kingsglaive, although their commander Drautos has disappeared. While Nyx succeeds in rescuing Lunafreya, many of the Kingsglaive turn on him; Nyx, Lunafreya and rebel leader Luche Lazarus escape as the ship disintegrates. At the treaty-signing ceremony, the Niflheim delegation springs a surprise attack and kills the ruling council, while their army enters by destroying the Wall with help from the rebels, who are subsequently massacred. Lunafreya and Nyx reach the Citadel just as Regis is battling Glauca. During the fight, Glauca cuts the Ring of the Lucii from Regis's hand. Ravus attempts to put on the Ring and claim its power, but it rejects him and destroys his arm before he can remove it. Nyx, Lunafreya and Regis retrieve the Ring and flee with Glauca in pursuit. Regis forces the two to go on without him, dying in his ensuing battle with Glauca. Aldercapt and Ardyn—having successfully stolen the Crystal—leave Insomnia to be destroyed by Niflheim's Daemons.

Summoned to the city plaza by a call from Drautos, Nyx and Lunafreya are cornered by Luche, who reveals himself to be Crowe's killer. Luche almost kills Nyx before being tricked by Lunafreya into putting on the Ring, resulting in his death. Drautos then appears, but is attacked by Libertus, who reveals that Drautos is in fact Glauca. Just as Glauca is about to kill them, Nyx puts on the Ring. He is confronted by the spirits of the past kings of Lucis; initially rejected due to being not of their bloodline, his resolve and the threat to the Crystal persuade them to allow his use of their power at the cost of his life. After fending off Glauca, Nyx returns the Ring to Lunafreya before entrusting her to Libertus, telling them to flee. With the Ring's borrowed power he engages Glauca in a titanic battle throughout Insomnia, animating the city's statues of past rulers, known as the "Old Wall", to combat Niflheim's Daemons. Their fight ends as dawn approaches, with Nyx mortally wounding Glauca; Nyx dies shortly after as payment for using the Ring's power, wishing for Noctis to rule well in the future. In the aftermath, Libertus escorts Lunafreya out of the city, but she tells him to stay behind. Lunafreya then leaves with the Ring to find Noctis.

In a post-credits scene, Noctis and his companions are en route to Altissia when their car breaks down, leading into the opening scenes of Final Fantasy XV.

== Voice cast ==
- Gō Ayano (JP) / Aaron Paul (EN) as Nyx Ulric. A member of the Kingsglaive guard with a strong affinity with the king's magical powers, he is assigned as the protector of Lunafreya. His likeness is based on French model Johan Akan, while his motion actor is Neil Newbon.
- Shioli Kutsuna (JP) / Lena Headey (EN) as Lunafreya Nox Fleuret, an Oracle capable of communing with the world's deities, and a former princess of Tenebrae. She is engaged to marry Noctis as part of the peace treaty between Lucis and Niflheim. Her likeness is based on Russian model Sonya Maltceva, while her motion actress is Amanda Piery.
- Tsutomu Isobe (JP) / Sean Bean (EN) as Regis Lucis Caelum CXIII, king of Lucis and father to Noctis Lucis Caelum, the main protagonist of Final Fantasy XV. British actor Jon Campling performed motion capture for the film and was the physical model for Regis in both Kingsglaive and Final Fantasy XV.
- Shōzō Iizuka (JP) / David Gant (EN) as Iedolas Aldercapt. He is the emperor of Niflheim and the main force behind its expansion. Gant also provided motion capture for the character.
- Keiji Fujiwara (JP) / Darin De Paul (EN) as Ardyn Izunia. The chancellor of Niflheim and the right hand of Aldercapt, Ardyn is a powerful political figure within the empire. His likeness is based on actor Edward Saxby, while his motion actor is Jon Campling.
- Kōichi Yamadera (JP) / Adrian Bouchet (EN) as Titus Drautos. He acts as the commander of the Kingsglaive, and a figurehead leader alongside Regis. He is also revealed to be General Glauca, the high commander of Niflheim's military forces. Bouchet serves as the character's motion actor and physical model.
- Yūichi Nakamura (JP) / Trevor Devall (EN) as Ravus Nox Fleuret. Lunafreya's older brother and a former prince of Tenebrae, he is now the deputy high commander of Niflheim's military with a grudge against Lucis. His motion actor is David Nutley.
- Mitsuaki Kanuka (JP) / Liam Mulvey (EN) as Libertus Ostium. Libertus is Nyx's childhood friend and a fellow member of the Kingsglaive. Mulvey serves as the motion actor and physical model for Libertus.
- Tomokazu Seki (JP) / Todd Haberkorn (EN) as Luche Lazarus. A trusted member of the Kingsglaive due to his intelligence, he holds a leader-like position within the unit. Luche's physical model and motion capture actor was Greg Blackford.
- Ayumi Fujimura (JP) / Alexa Kahn (EN) as Crowe Altius. A Kingsglaive member and powerful mage, she considers the Kingsglaive her family due to being orphaned, and shares a close sibling-like relationship with Libertus. Crowe's physical appearance was modeled after actress Andrea Tivadar who also did the motion capture for the role.

Other characters include the various members of the Kingsglaive and Regis' council: Banjō Ginga (JP) / John DeMita (EN) as Clarus Amicitia, father to main character Gladiolus; Wataru Takagi (JP) / Ben Diskin (EN) as Pelna Khara; and Fuminori Komatsu (JP) / Max Mittelman (EN) as Tredd Furia. Unvoiced characters include Kingsglaive members Sonitus Bellum and Axis Arra. While both English and Japanese voicetracks were produced, lip syncing for all versions was matched to the English voice work. The lead voice actors, such as Paul, were chosen so they would be recognized and appeal to a wide audience, in addition to their acting abilities. The Japanese voice casting followed a similar model, choosing well-known actors for the lead roles. Casting was handled by Rui Kawada, who also acted as general project manager. The compartmentalization of the development meant that the characters were mostly voiced by different actors to Final Fantasy XV. Originally there were plans for both the film and game voice cast to cross over, but these were scrapped.

== Production ==
Kingsglaive: Final Fantasy XV forms part of the "Final Fantasy XV Universe", a multimedia project based around the 2016 video game Final Fantasy XV that includes the original net animation series Brotherhood: Final Fantasy XV: the story of XV, originally a spin-off title called Final Fantasy Versus XIII, was large enough to have covered several games, but as the team did not want to create any additional games, they decided to create additional media. While similar in style to the Compilation of Final Fantasy VII project, the media associated with Final Fantasy XV came before the game's release rather than after it, acting as insight into the world and characters. XV and its associated media likewise hold a thematic connection to Fabula Nova Crystallis Final Fantasy, a compilation of games and associated media sharing a common mythos while boasting unconnected stories and settings. While distanced from the Fabula Nova Crystallis brand for marketing purposes, the world of XV still uses its mythos and design elements. Kingsglaive was designed so it would not be necessary for people to watch to understand the main game. Despite this, references to the events of Kingsglaive were included in the game. Following the release of the game, director Hajime Tabata described Kingsglaive and Brotherhood as granting a better view of the game's world, adding that those who only played the game might notice the missing context.

Kingsglaive was primarily developed by Visual Works, a division of Final Fantasy developer Square Enix dedicated to the creation of CGI cutscenes. The director was Takeshi Nozue. Nozue's previous notable experience with feature-length productions was the 2005 feature Final Fantasy VII: Advent Children. While he had been co-director of Advent Children, he was sole director of Kingsglaive. Speaking about his role, Nozue said he felt overwhelmed by having to answer to so many producers on a single project. Tabata acted as one of the film's producer. While compared upon reveal to Advent Children, it was stressed that the two served very different purposes: while Advent Children was designed for fans of its parent title Final Fantasy VII (1997), Kingsglaive was intended for both prospective players of Final Fantasy XV and people new to the Final Fantasy series, acting as an entry point into the narrative of XV. The project was also much greater in scale than Advent Children, requiring help from multiple external studios. Nozue later commented that another aspect of Kingsglaive was to bolster sales of the game's platforms prior to release, with a film offering a greater means of reaching potential buyers. Production work on Kingsglaive began three years prior to its release, with full development beginning in 2014 after an extended period of preparatory work. From this point, production lasted approximately two and a half years.

So the production could be managed in the short time available, the film's development was separated into three phases, with each phase being dedicated to a particular part of the production process and run by a different unit director answering to Nozue. The film went through multiple phases of trial and error until the final product was solidified. Kingsglaive was kept a secret until 2016 when it was near completion, as the developers felt that they had announced its parent video game too early. So as to remain close to the development of Final Fantasy XV, the lead staff of Kingsglaive moved from Visual Works to Business Division 2, the department of Square Enix responsible for the game's development. This was part of an overall shift in development methods when the game was changed from a spin-off to a mainline entry.

In addition to the staff of Advent Children, Western companies in gaming and film production were involved: Digic Pictures, who had worked on the graphics for the Assassin's Creed series; and Image Engine, who had worked on multiple films including Jurassic World (2015) and the television series Game of Thrones. According to Nozue, around 50 different companies were involved in the film's production: among these was Europe-based company Puppetworks Animation Studio. This approach was unconventional in Japan, and the first major collaboration entered into by Square Enix for CGI projects. The internal team was estimated at 50 people. The cooperation of studios overseas meant that work on the film could proceed continuously. Without this external aid, Nozue estimated that they would have needed a staff of five hundred people to complete the film in the given timeframe. According to Nozue, the film was only half-finished two and a half months before its planned release, and a huge effort was needed from all the involved studios to complete it in time. Nozue attributed the large number of helpful overseas studios to their common liking of the Final Fantasy franchise.

=== Story and characters ===
The story of Kingsglaive was based around a portion of the original opening of Final Fantasy XV, which would have shown the invasion of Insomnia by Niflheim's army. This had to be cut from the game due to concerns over the volume of content, but as the team still wanted to show this event, they incorporated it into the plot of Kingsglaive. To ensure a connection between the film and the game, both projects used the same shared script as their core. That script was written by Saori Itamuro based on a draft by Kazushige Nojima. The team also wanted a proper cinematic experience that would appeal to a large audience, so they brought in a professional screenwriter, Takashi Hasegawa, to create a full-length cinematic script. Nozue described the majority of Hasegawa's work as that of a script doctor, with him spending one and a half months tweaking the script created by the Final Fantasy team.

Los Angeles-based company Hydra Entertainment assisted with creating the script alongside Hasegawa, in addition to writing assistance from Hollywood staff. The storyline was designed to complement and set the stage for the events of XV without revealing major plot elements from the game. The film was created for a primarily English audience, with the script translation handled by Square Enix's in-house localization team. The narrative was split into three acts, with production on the CGI element of each act finishing before beginning work on the next. This meant that last-minute adjustments were taking place until the end of production. As many team members were Final Fantasy fans, frequent nostalgic references to earlier entries in the series were included.

The central theme for the overall story of Final Fantasy XV was the bond between father and son: Kingsglaive represented the theme from the father Regis' point of view. According to Nozue, another key element during the early segment of the film was displaying how the world's society sees Regis's responsibilities, along with the emotions involved in such a role. The main goal for the film's characters was to portray them as normal people with character flaws, rather than magical superheroes. Nyx was an original character created for the film with no connection to the events of the game, intended to act as a medium for the wider audience Kingsglaive was aimed at. Nyx also provided a medium for the story themes surrounding immigration issues, which in turn brought the audience closer to the main cast. While Nyx was original, multiple key characters from the game played prominent roles, particularly Regis, Lunafreya, and Ardyn. Lunafreya was highlighted as the "keystone" connecting the game, the film, and the anime series Brotherhood. While her role in the film was not an active one, her strength was conveyed through her single-minded devotion to her goals.

=== Design ===
Prior to full production, the team created a tech demo in 2012 to test the creation and movement of highly detailed models and environments. This tech demo was titled Agni's Philosophy, which also acted as a test demo for the Luminous Studio engine which would be used for Final Fantasy XV. Character designs and modelling was overseen by Business Division 2; the team was led by Kazuaki Iwasawa, the character model supervisor. The character Crowe's hair was based on the hairstyle for the main female protagonist of Agni's Philosophy. The hairstyles for both Crowe and Lunafreya were first modelled using a real mannequin wig to ensure they could be managed. Their fully rendered wigs were composed of three thousand curves each, a thousand more than originally estimated.

The characters' body and facial movements were recorded using motion capture: these included capturing static figures for dialogue segments, and full-body capture for action sequences. The motion actors provided the basis for their characters' appearance: the actors were chosen based on how well they fitted with the staff's vision for the characters. The motion actors' facial expressions were captured using a special head-mounted rig the team had previously developed for the 2012 tech demo. When the character designs were being created, Nozue needed to regularly consult professional hairstylists to ensure that their chosen hairstyles for characters would be feasible in real life. For characters who appeared in the game, the team tried to keep their facial features as close as possible to their in-game counterpart. As with other Japanese CGI films aiming for a realistic tone, the team relied on photogrammetry and an extensive 3D scanning process combined with motion capture. Character clothing was created in a similar way to real-life clothing, with a number of different design variations being tested using paper cutouts. Something that both in-house and external staff contended with was making character movements realistic without being symmetrical; the biggest example was Libertus's need to walk on crutches for much of the film, shifting his weight balance and movement speed.

Insomnia—the capital of Lucis—was based in general on international cities, while its core was based on Tokyo: Western elements were added based on fan criticism of Insomnia being too similar to Tokyo during the game's early stages. The design of the Niflheim airships was an updated version of those in the earlier days of Final Fantasy XV's development, when it was known as Versus XIII. Regis was extensively redesigned for the film, which in turn altered his appearance in the game. Initially created with a younger appearance, the team wanted him to have a proper regal air so he would have presence in Kingsglaive, so they aged the character significantly and created a story-based context for the change. The overall theme of the XV universe was "a fantasy based on reality": to reinforce this, Square Enix collaborated with Audi on a custom version of their Audi R8 model as the royal family's personal transport, and included references to real-world brands and companies such as Japan Airlines. Most of the film's individual props such as the car, Nyx's daggers, the Niflheim mechs and the Ring of the Lucii were created and rendered before main production had begun.

Lighting and its effect on characters' skin was of particular importance to the Business Division 2 team, with a lot of work going into making sure shading and transparency fitted with each character's position in a scene in relation to its lighting. Previsualization was initially going to be done entirely in-house, but the team eventually decided to bring in The Third Floor, an external company specializing in previsualization. The Third Floor ended up handling around 40% of the work. The animation was also supposed to be handled in-house using the V-Ray software, but the team found it difficult to adapt the software to their needs. As Nozue wanted to use the experience and technology of Visual Works to create Kingsglaive, they decided to bring in experienced and dedicated outside help to handle V-Ray. This resulted in the cooperation with Digic Pictures, which included former staff from Square Enix's North American branch and were highly skilled in the creation of high-quality cutscenes. For procedural environmental elements such as falling rubble, they used the Houdini animation software.

=== Music ===
The film's score was composed by John R. Graham, with the main theme by Yoko Shimomura, the composer for Final Fantasy XV. The score for Kingsglaive was described by Nozue as "Shimomura meets Hollywood". This effect was reinforced by Graham's work. According to Graham, Nozue wanted a complex musical score. The harmonics and themes change throughout the score to create both an ambiguous atmosphere and a sense of impending tragedy and loss. Graham was brought on board to create a score that would fill the film's world and act as a counterbalance to Shimomura's music from the game, which was incorporated into the overall score. Due to the themes and events of Kingsglaive, Graham needed his music to reflect the weight, contradictions, and shifting "light and dark" perspectives of the characters and locations. To achieve this, he used a combination of live orchestra and electronic elements. He wrote more than 100 minutes of music. Recording was done in Nashville using a symphonic orchestra. The soundtrack was released as a two-disc album on September 7, 2016.

== Release and promotion ==
Kingsglaive was first announced in March 2016 at "Uncovered: Final Fantasy XV", a media event dedicated to the game. Its release was handled by publisher Square Enix and distributor Sony Pictures Home Entertainment. At the time, no theatrical release was announced for the West, until later in June when it was revealed that Kingsglaive would receive a limited theatrical release in North America, beginning on August 19; its theatrical release was handled by Stage 6 Films with Vertical Entertainment and Square Enix. A further week's run was announced for some areas. Le Grand Rex was a host for French premiere of Kingsglaive on September 15. Kingsglaive was released in Japanese cinemas through Aniplex on July 9, where day one fans were given exclusive Lunafreya post cards. Tickets went on sale on April 23. Prior to its theatrical release, a television special titled "XV Universe Report" aired in Japan, featuring behind-the-scenes information and interviews regarding Final Fantasy XV and its associated media.

=== Home media ===
Kingsglaive was included on Blu-ray in the "Deluxe Edition" and "Ultimate Collector's Edition" of Final Fantasy XV, which were released worldwide on November 29, 2016. The film was also included in the "Final Fantasy XV Film Collection", a box set which includes Final Fantasy XV and Brotherhood. The digital version of the film was released on streaming and download services on August 30; the standalone Blu-ray and DVD versions were released on October 4. It was released on Ultra HD Blu-ray on March 30, 2021.

== Reception ==
=== Box office ===
The film debuted in Japan in 10th place, selling 22,818 tickets for a total of ¥35,516,460 ($345,507) in two days. By July 20, over 70,000 tickets had been sold, bringing a total gross of over ¥105 million in Japan ($907,524). Its high takings were attributed to positive word of mouth following the initial release. During the openings of its limited run in the United States, the film grossed a further $190,000. It eventually grossed $269,980 in the region. Upon release in China in March 2017, the film entered at No. 4 in the top-grossing films of that week, being the highest grossing new release with $3.90 million. The film went on to gross $4.2 million in China. Its total worldwide gross reached over $6.4 million as of April 2017. The home video releases of Kingsglaive were among the top 20 best-selling DVD and Blu-ray releases for October 2016. The two releases reached a combined gross of $4,549,411 in the United States.

=== Critical response ===
On Rotten Tomatoes, the film has an approval rating of 13%, based on 16 reviews, with an average rating of 4.79/10. On Metacritic, which assigns a weighted average to reviews, the film has a score of 35 out of 100, based on 10 critics, indicating "generally unfavorable reviews". Critics were generally negative about the film, although popular opinion rendered a more positive response.

Christian Holub of Entertainment Weekly gave the film a score of C+, describing the film as a long cutscene for fans of the game rather than something equivalent to the recent Warcraft film adaptation: he said that the visuals "offer a deep dive into the Uncanny Valley", and praised the lead actors' efforts with a script he found weak. Meghan Sullivan, writing for IGN, gave the film a score of 6/10, calling it "gorgeous", and praised the character design despite some issues with realistic facial expressions, and found the story was bogged down by the political elements when the action side and the plot focusing on the Kingsglaive worked. In contrast, she called the voicework "solid", saying that the leads brought their characters to life and prevented the script from sounding too ridiculous while the supporting cast was weaker overall. She summed up Kingsglaive as "a very beautiful and very confusing movie". Andrew Barker for Variety frequently questioned whether Kingsglaive could count as a film, as he often felt like he was watching a recorded gameplay video, praising the visuals while generally faulting the plot as rushed and too full of throwaway characters. Wired's Matt Kamen gave the film a score of 5/10. He greatly praised the film's visuals, and was positive about the lead actors' performances and the action scenes. His criticism was leveled at its poor portrayal of the female characters, a narrative he found confusing, and the large focus on setting up the events of Final Fantasy XV. His overall opinion was that, while it held promise, it relied too much on character stereotypes and world building, calling it "a gorgeous but over-stuffed slice of fanservice".

Eurogamer's Aoife Wilson found it difficult to pin down why she had enjoyed the film, as she found it "bloated and badly done", ending up saying that, despite its flaws, it felt like part of the Final Fantasy franchise. She again praised the visuals, but found the dialog to be the film's weakest point despite the efforts of the lead actors. She summed up Kingsglaive by saying that "as a two-hour piece of promotional material for a game, it works". Scott Clay of RPGFan called watching the film a necessity for fully understanding the world of Final Fantasy XV, and praised it for its visuals and action scenes, although he noted that there were probably better action films available. He felt that Kingsglaive managed to get him invested in the story of XV, saying it was "no masterpiece — in fact, it's nowhere close to one — but it does its job nicely by setting up what could potentially be a very cool story". Polygon's Ashley Oh missed the character development usually seen in the Final Fantasy games although the cast did their best with the script, and while she found the visuals "jaw-droppingly gorgeous" and enjoyed the references to other Final Fantasy titles, she found the story "very weak". She also faulted the lack of strong female characters, something that had been a noted feature in earlier Final Fantasy titles. In contrast to the majority of reviewers, Anthony John Agnello of GamesRadar gave the film five out of five stars, calling it "an expert blend of world building, humanity, and the magical strangeness of Final Fantasy" and praising it for balancing its scene setting for Final Fantasy XV with creating a relatable experience, in addition to lauding its visuals and relatable characters. GameSpot's Alexa Ray Corriea was also fairly positive: while she noted that it was not a coherent film on its own, she felt that it was a first step by Square Enix to regain fan trust after earlier missteps. She generally enjoyed the story despite a few contrived elements, and gave unanimous praise to the large-scale and more intimate visuals.
