= Hajime Tabata =

Japanese video game director (born 1971)

- 田畑 端
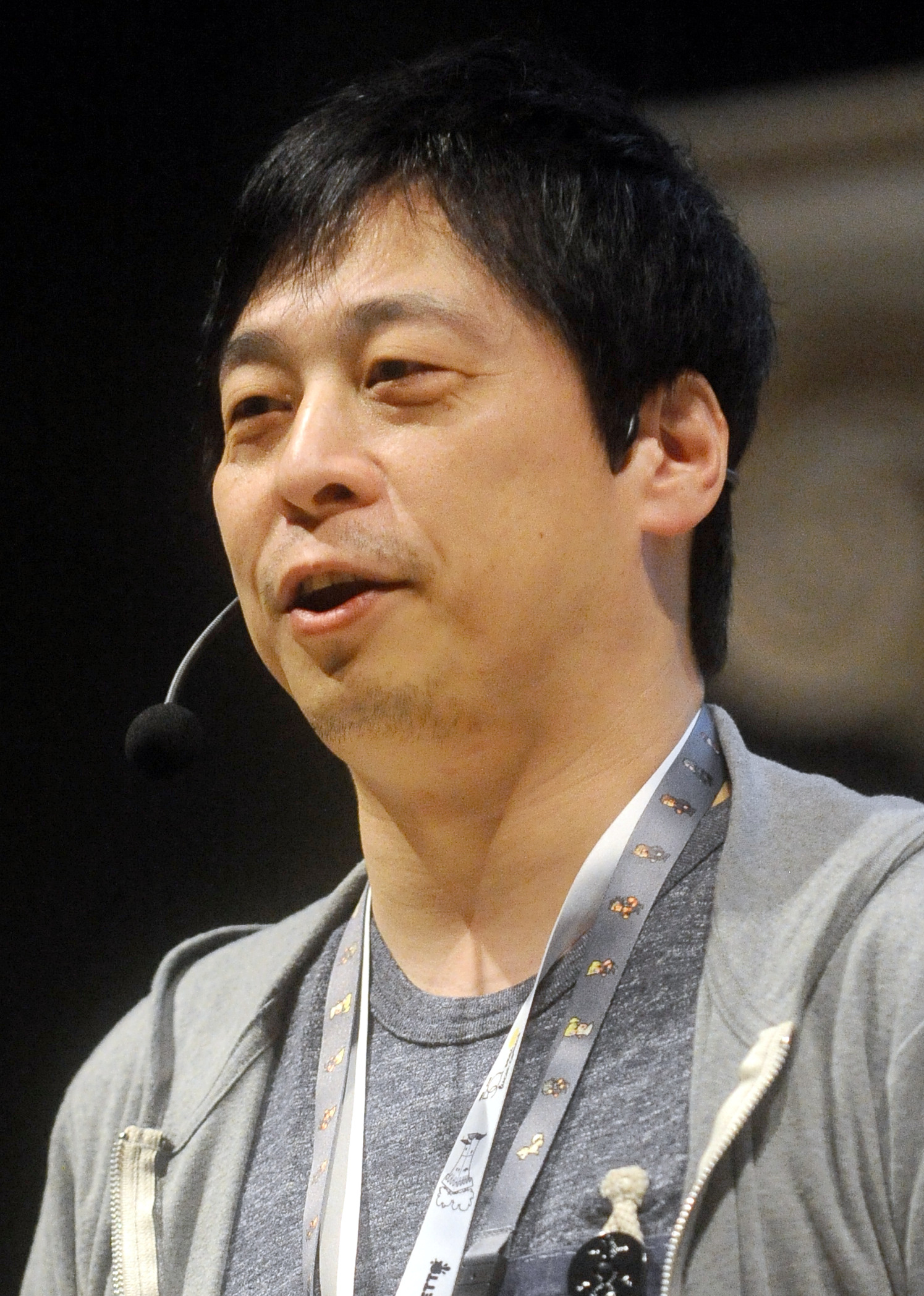
- Tabata at Lucca Comics & Games 2016
- Born: May 5, 1971 (age 55); Iwate Prefecture, Japan
- Occupation: CEO of JP Games

Hajime Tabata (田畑 端, Tabata Hajime; born May 5, 1971) is a Japanese game director, the previous Luminous Productions COO and head of studio who formerly worked for Square Enix and currently the CEO of JP Games.

He was the head of Square Enix's Business Division 2 and part of the Final Fantasy Committee that is tasked with keeping the franchise's releases and content consistent.

Tabata resigned from Luminous Productions and Square Enix Group on October 31, 2018.

== Career ==
While in middle school, Tabata played a historical role-playing game made by Koei and first imagined how much fun it would be to make his own game. In his last year of university, he applied for jobs in the video game industry and in other media arts such as documentaries, television and film. He worked at several different video game publishers prior to his being hired at Square Enix, which he said gave him experience making action games, arcade games, and role-playing games.

=== Square Enix ===
In the aftermath of the 2011 Tohoku earthquake, the international outpouring of support for Japan was paralleled at Square Enix by fan letters about the then-upcoming release of Type-0, and encouraged Tabata to make something special for the fans and those living through difficult times.

He became the director of Final Fantasy XV, taking over from Tetsuya Nomura in December 2013, a change that was announced in September the following year. He used to be co-director on the project. During his work on Final Fantasy XV, Tabata joked about his busy schedule, mentioning he regularly got only three hours sleep. Tabata, whose previous experience was with portable gaming devices, said that he was excited to work on console systems and wanted to "help players dive even deeper into their experiences".

Tabata formerly served as producer for Final Fantasy XV downloadable content. His work on the downloadable content was planned to continue into 2019. He and staff within Square Enix Business Division 2 were also working on a new intellectual property targeting the next-generation of consoles. Development for this project began in earnest in 2018, after previously only having a small team of 20-30 people assigned to it.

In March 2018, Tabata created a new Tokyo game studio for Square Enix called Luminous Productions, which consists of several key members from the Final Fantasy XV team. He was the COO and head of studio for Luminous Productions.

Tabata resigned from Luminous Productions and Square Enix Group on October 31, which was confirmed by Square Enix on November 7. In addition, 3 of the 4 DLCs for Final Fantasy XV were cancelled.

=== JP Games, Inc. ===
With the announcement of his resignation from Square Enix, Tabata began starting his own company, JP Games, Inc., which was launched in January 2019, to create a new project. The first project, The Pegasus Dream Tour, a game themed around the 2020 Summer Paralympics, was released in June 2021 for iOS and Android.

== Works ==
Year	Title	Platform(s)	Credit(s)
1999	Monster Rancher 2	PlayStation	Event director
1999	Deception III: Dark Delusion	PlayStation	Event director
2004	Before Crisis: Final Fantasy VII	Mobile	Director, concept
2005	Last Order: Final Fantasy VII	Anime	Special thanks
2006	Monotone	Mobile	Director
2007	Crisis Core: Final Fantasy VII	PlayStation Portable	Director
2008-10	Kingdom Hearts Coded	Mobile	Co-director
2010	The 3rd Birthday	PlayStation Portable	Director
2011	Final Fantasy Type-0	PlayStation Portable	Director, original scenario design
2014	Final Fantasy Agito	iOS, Android	Producer
2015	Final Fantasy Type-0 HD	PlayStation 4, Xbox One, Windows	Producer, director
2015	Final Fantasy: Brave Exvius	iOS, Android	Special thanks
2016	Kingsglaive: Final Fantasy XV	Film	Producer
2016	Final Fantasy XV	PlayStation 4, Xbox One	Director
2017	Mobius Final Fantasy	iOS, Android, Windows	Collaborative event support
2017	King's Knight: Wrath of the Dark Dragon	iOS, Android	Special thanks
2017	Itadaki Street: Dragon Quest and Final Fantasy 30th Anniversary	PlayStation 4, PlayStation Vita	Special thanks
2017	Final Fantasy Dimensions II	iOS, Android	Special thanks
2017	Monster of the Deep: Final Fantasy XV	PlayStation 4 (PlayStation VR)	Producer
2018	Dissidia Final Fantasy NT	PlayStation 4	Special thanks
2018	Final Fantasy XV: Pocket Edition	iOS, Android, Windows	Producer
2018	Final Fantasy XV Windows Edition	Windows	Producer
2018	Final Fantasy XV: Pocket Edition HD	PlayStation 4, Xbox One, Nintendo Switch	Producer
2021	The Pegasus Dream Tour	iOS, Android	Producer, Director
