= Characters of The World Ends with You =

Video game characters

Artwork of the cast of the two games designed by Gen Kobayashi. From left to right: Joshua, Neku, Shiki, Beat, Rhyme, Fret, Minamimoto, Rindo, Shoka and Nagi.

The World Ends with You is an action role-playing game co-developed by Square Enix and Jupiter for the Nintendo DS. The game takes place in a recreated and stylized version of the Shibuya district in Tokyo, Japan. In the story, the player controls undead teenagers from Shibuya, as protagonist Neku Sakuraba and his allies Shiki, Joshua, and Beat are forced to participate in a game that will determine their fate. They fight creatures known as Noise, controlled by Reapers. For each week of the Game, Game Masters are assigned by the Conductor to lead the opposition to the players. Of the Game Masters opposing Neku, while participating in the Games to earn promotions for their performance, the Reapers' goal is to ascend to the highest form of spiritual existence, the Angels. Angels supervise the Games and, if the stakes of a Game are particularly high, they send down one of their own to serve as the Producer.

In the 2021 sequel Neo: The World Ends with You, which takes place three years after the first game, a new cast of characters play the Reapers' Game in Shibuya. This includes the young Rindo, who has the power of time travelling; his close friend Fret, who has access to people's thoughts; the otaku Nagi, who Rindo and Fret recruit; the Reaper Sho Minamimoto, who returns from the first game as an ally to the children; the Reaper Shoka, who dislikes her superiors' current actions; and returning players Beat and Neku. Together, they battle Noise and Reapers to return to the world of the living and save Shibuya after the antagonist Shiba took down Shinjuku.

The characters were created by Tatsuya Kando and designed primarily by Tetsuya Nomura. The clashing nature of Neku with other players was often criticized by video game journalists, who feel the characters are too antisocial. However, they have also been compared with shut-ins, better known as hikikomori in Japan, and chūnibyō types of students. The handling of the cast in the sequel Neo: The World Ends with You was better received by critics for the new system, which allows the player to control them simultaneously. They can also have meals and change their clothing to become stronger, giving the player notable handling of party members.

== Creation ==
The developers of The World Ends with You decided to stay with two-dimensional sprites instead of three-dimensional models for the title, believing it would help differentiate themselves from other Square Enix titles as well as better represent their vision for the game. When first approached with the task of creating the art for the game, background art director Takayuki Ohdachi thought the modern-day setting would be too boring, and opted to use highly skewed and angular images of Shibuya to avoid this; the rest of the creative team found this approach to fit the game quite well. For combat, the background of the top screen was selected for visual interest, while the bottom touchscreen background was designed to emphasize the gameplay. Ohdachi was also responsible for the artwork for the psych pins, and used a mix of pop art and tribal designs for the various graphics.

As The World Ends with You focuses on the character of Neku Sakuraba and his growth, to create a more believable story the developers put focus on his development, such as how he would feel, what thoughts lie behind his actions, how he interacted with other characters, and how the people around him feel about him. The developers included aspects and daily concerns, hoping that they could be things that players would have to deal with in their personal lives and therefore would let them relate with Neku and feel like they are a part of the game. Tatsuya Kando, director of The World Ends with You, described Neku as a character who prefers to be left alone, yet feels lonely and wants to interact with others. They also hoped that this would help players develop an understanding and tolerance for Neku's actions, which could help them feel more comfortable with controlling someone who does not act how they would like them to.

Kando said that, as Neku and his friends were at the center of the story in the original game and thus became highly popular, they were afraid they would overshadow Rindo's group. As a result, they were careful with how to approach them. In order to keep Neku and the others from becoming too central to the story, Kando decided to have Beat play the role of connecting both installments, with Neku appearing near the end as a supporting character. Nomura decided to keep their roles a secret from the fans before its release. Kando considered establishing that Beat had taken on Neku's name. However, as the story continued to take shape, it was changed so that others instead mistook him for Neku.

=== Designs ===
Character designs were handled by Tetsuya Nomura and Gen Kobayashi. Character designs were made to match with the real-world Tokyo setting, after which their outfits were designed based on the character's personality. Kobayashi was also in charge of designing the game's non-player characters and noted how most designs made it to the final product. Neku wears the Jupiter of Monkey brand, which the artist considers to be the most important part of his design, with his successor Rindo wearing the same brand. Both leads are based on the Japanese saying, "see not, hear not, and speak not". With Neku, his signature feature was his big headphones, a concept tied to "hear no evil". For the animated adaptation of The World Ends With You, the staff found the idea of showing Beat and Neku's Fusion move to be a challenge to animate.

For Neo, Nomura returned to design the character art. For the lead character of Rindo, he was looking to provide some type of iconic item of clothing that would make him stand out and represent his isolated personality, similar to Neku's headphones in the original game. Prior to the COVID-19 pandemic, he had seen that face masks had become a popular fashion accessory for the youth of Japan and opted for that;he did not imagine that face masks would become a normal occurrence in the world by the time the game launched. Shiki's true persona is shown in the sequel game, where Miki Yamashita was in charge of designing her outfit. Shiki was designed to look "fashionable in her own right, though not yet sophisticated". He gave her a green cardigan and leggings, attempting to make her look more modern but without major changes from the first game.

== Playable characters ==
=== Neku Sakuraba ===
Neku Sakuraba (桜庭 音操, Sakuraba Neku; ネク Neku) is an initially asocial teenage boy who claims that he does not "get" people, and rarely interacts with others at first. Computer-controlled characters make up the rest of the cast, which includes players paired with Neku.

=== Shiki Misaki ===
Shiki Misaki (美咲 四季, Misaki Shiki; シキ Shiki) is a teenage girl who takes on the form of her best friend, as her physical appearance was her price of entry for the Game.

=== Yoshiya Kiryu ===
In the second Game, Neku's partner is an intelligent and sly teenage boy, Yoshiya Kiryu (桐生 義弥, Kiryū Yoshiya), who prefers to be called Joshua (ヨシュア, Yoshua). Joshua is later revealed to be the Composer, a godlike entity and head of the Game.

=== Daisukenojo Bito ===
Neku's final partner is Daisukenojo Bito (尾藤 大輔之丞, Bitō Daisukenojō), originally a player and ex-Reaper who calls himself "Beat" (ビイト, Biito). Beat became a Reaper to find a way to bring his younger sister, Raimu Bito (尾藤 来夢, Bitō Raimu) (nicknamed "Rhyme" (ライム, Raimu)), back to life, as she had sacrificed herself to save him from a Noise attack.

=== Rindo Kanade ===
Rindo Kanade (奏 竜胆, Kanade Rindō), is a high school student and a Player in the Reapers' Game. Using a pin created by Kubo, Rindo can travel across time whenever a situation becomes too complicated to handle. While he is a close friend of Tosai, he also forms a deep bond with the Reaper Shoka, who is revealed to be his online friend Swallow.

=== Tosai Furesawa ===
Tosai Furesawa (觸澤 桃斎, Furesawa Tōsai), nicknamed Fret (フレット, Furetto), is a close friend of Rindo, who has the power of giving people information. While he initially acts comical, his crush Kanon Tachibana helps him become more honest with himself.

=== Nagi Usui ===
Nagi Usui (笛吹 梛, Usui Nagi) is a gaming otaku college student who joins the Wicked Twisters. Nagi can go into people's minds with "Dive". She has a crush on Sho Minamimoto, who reminds her of a fictional hero she often plays as.

=== Sho Minamimoto ===
Sho Minamimoto (南師 猩, Minamimoto Shō; ミナミモト Minamimoto) is the most dangerous, as he willingly circumvents the rules in an attempt to supplant the Composer.

=== Shoka Sakurane ===
Shoka Sakurane (桜音 紫陽花, Sakurane Shōka) later joins the Wicked Twisters as their fifth member. Rindo is also supported by Swallow (スワロウさん, Suwarou-san), his online friend who he communicates with through a social media game and text messages. Swallow's identity is an ongoing mystery Rindo attempts to uncover throughout the game, which is only revealed after the story's climax. Several protagonists from the first game also appear to support the new cast.

== Other characters ==
=== Sanae Hanekoma ===
Sanae Hanekoma is the Producer. Disguised as a Shibuya café owner, he guides new players and narrates the "Secret Reports", which are obtained by completing additional missions after completing the game.

=== Shiba Miyakaze ===
Reapers are split into two groups: the Shibuya Reapers, who first appeared in the original game, and the Shinjuku Reapers, who are new. The Shinjuku Reapers include Shiba Miyakaze (三谷風 椎葉, Miyakaze Shiiba),

=== Tanzo Kubo ===
Tanzo Kubo (久網 旦蔵, Kubō Tanzō) is the Game Master in the Reapers' Game.

=== Ayano Kamachi ===
Ayano Kamachi (蒲池 菖乃, Kamachi Ayano),

=== Kaie Ono ===
Kaie Ono (小野 解依, Ono Kaie),

=== Hishima Sazakuchi ===
Hishima Sazakuchi (坂筑 菱真, Sazakuchi Hishima) and Shibuya Reapers, returning from the first game, are antagonists.

=== Koki Kariya ===
Koki Kariya (狩谷 拘輝, Kariya Kōki), Uzuki Yashiro (八代 卯月, Yashiro Uzuki), and

=== Coco Atarashi ===
Coco Atarashi (新 子々, Atarashi Koko), who returns from the first game's Solo Remix followed by LIVE Remix and Final Remix.

=== Kaichi Susuki ===
Rindo and his friends compete against rival teams, including the Ruinbringers, the top team in the Reapers' Game, whose members include Kaichi Susuki (周々木 鹿ー, Susuki Kaichi), nicknamed Susukichi (ススキチ)

=== Tsugumi Matsunae ===
Tsugumi Matsunae (松苗 亜実, Matsunae Tsugumi), the latter of whom returns from the first game's Solo Remix and Final Remix re-releases, Other rival groups include the Deep Rivers Society, a group of river enthusiasts led by Fuya Kawahara (河原 封也, Kawahara Fuuya), and the Variabeauties, a group of super stylists led by

=== Kanon Tachibana ===
Kanon Tachibana (立花 果遠, Tachibana Kanon), and the Purehearts, a group of savvy social media influencers.

=== Motoi Anazawa ===
Motoi Anazawa (モトイ, Anazawa Motoi).

== Reception ==
Since appearing in The World Ends with You, Neku's character attracted mixed responses. Crispy Gamer editor Steve Steinberg regarded him as a common antisocial RPG youth often used by developers. His brooding personality and youth was made comparable to other Final Fantasy series characters such as Cloud Strife, Vaan, and Squall Leonhart, and that the story needs developing. In an article centered around RPG characters, RPGamer praised his special moves, which come from pins, and that he stands out for being awkward to deal with in a group of characters. The Escapist in particular liked the relationship Neku develops with the antagonist Joshua due to their contrasting personalities, which makes the former come across as growing, especially in the second week of the game. The final twist that Joshua was manipulating Neku and was responsible for his death also appealed to the writer, since the villain is moved by the protagonist's growth which subverts the other antagonist's interactions, such as Kefka Palazzo from Final Fantasy VI, whose desire to become a god became a trope in role-playing games.

Before the release of Neo, GameInformer saw that trailers teased the possible return of Neku but claimed that he might not "steal the spotlight" from the new characters, as the Wicked Twisters appeared to be the most promising characters appearing in the sequel. When it came to the main cast, Nintendo Life found satisfaction in the successor of the original video game and its lead Neku. He praised the initial cast as well as the English localization enough to avoid the Japanese option, which multiple gamers tend to prefer. They also liked the handling of the combat and grinding through feeding the characters, due to the freedom the player is given when it comes to finding Noise or practising their preferred pins. 'RPGamer enjoyed how each of the main characters have their own unique skills outside combat, which gives them their own roles in completing the Reaper's Game. IGN found the handling of the character parties more important than in the original, where Neku only had one ally, in contrast to how Rindo's group increases and they can have meals together outside of fights.

In "Toward a Gameic World: New Rules of Engagement from Japanese Video Games", B. Whaley describes Neku as an insecure shut-in, better known as hikikomori in Japan. Neku's personality is a subversion of common modern Japanese RPG characters, with his character arc helping him to forget his fears and become able to appreciate human life. In order to achieve such a goal, Neku interacts with characters who are archetypes of the chūnibyō involving the youth ignored by society. He said the game can be seen as "gameic social narrative commenting on hikikomori and the broader issues surrounding youth culture in contemporary Japan". The gameplay allows the audience to engage in strategies against social withdrawal in new forms of sociotopographical play. While the word hikikomori is never said in the game, the main cast can easily be seen as such, like when Neku criticizes the idea of friendship, which saddens Shiki. A common theme seen when Neku is with Shiki and Joshua is the idea of everyone manipulating one another for their own sake. However, with Shiki's aid, throughout the game Neku is able to overcome his insecurities and stop acting like a hikikomori. Shiki's personal story delves into her struggles to fit in at school, especially when it is revealed that she took the appearance of her friend Eri, who she harbors jealousy and hatred towards. The reason for her death has implications of suicide, but is only ever stated as an "accident" in the game. Shiki's relationship with Neku often associates friendship with Shiki seeking to be seen for her true persona.

AV Club said that the gameplay of The World Ends with You helps to develop the protagonist, as he is forced to work with others and socialize despite disliking the idea, wearing headphones to distance himself from them. When it came to the adaptation of the video game, Cartoon Cipher from Anime News Network said that the point of the anime is making Neku realize the importance of the world in which he lives, which makes his early appearances relatable due to his highly antisocial personality, which is easy for viewers to mock. However, his character arc was praised for being rewarding like in the game, as he has multiple interactions with the supporting cast, such as Shiki. These relationships help Neku to better appreciate teamwork and people in general. The character's special skills using pins was praised by Cipher for being executed in animation.
