= The World Ends with You: The Animation =

2021 Japanese anime television series

- Key visual of the series

すばらしきこのせかい The Animation (Subarashiki Kono Sekai: Ji Animēshon)
- Genre: Action, fantasy
- Created by: Square Enix
- Anime television series
- Directed by: Kazuya Ichikawa
- Written by: Midori Gotō
- Music by: Takeharu Ishimoto
- Studio: Domerica; Shin-Ei Animation
- Licensed by: Crunchyroll: SA/SEA: Medialink; CH: Bilibili Anime
- Original network: JNN (MBS, TBS)
- Original run: April 10, 2021 – June 26, 2021
- Episodes: 12

The World Ends with You: The Animation (Note: Japanese: すばらしきこのせかい The Animation, Hepburn: Subarashiki Kono Sekai: Ji Animēshon) is a 2021 Japanese anime television series adaptation of the action role-playing game The World Ends with You published by Square Enix. The anime was a joint production between Domerica and Shin-Ei Animation.

== Cast and characters ==
Character	Voice actor	
Character	Japanese voice actor	English voice actor
Main cast
Neku Sakuraba	Koki Uchiyama	Ben Balmaceda
Shiki Misaki	Anna Hachimine	Morgan Garrett
Yoshiya "Joshua" Kiryu	Ryōhei Kimura	Clifford Chapin
Daisuke "Beat" Bito	Subaru Kimura	Van Barr Jr.
Recurring cast
Sanae Hanekoma	Kenjirô Tsuda	Brandon Potter
Uzuki Yashiro	Satomi Arai	Jessica Peterson
Koki Kariya	Anri Katsu	Andrew Kishino
Raimu "Rhyme" Bito	Ayana Taketatsu	Dani Chambers
Megumi Kitaniji	Hiroshi Shirokuma	Christopher Wehkamp
Sho Minamimoto	Takayuki Fujimoto	Brent Mukai
Mitsuki Konishi	Hitomi Nabatame	Marisa Duran
Yodai Higashizawa	Kenji Takahashi	Anthony DiMascio
777	Shûhei Sakaguchi	Ricco Fajardo
Sôta Honjo	Yûsuke Suda	Matt Shipman
Nao	Mami Fujita	Brittany Lauda
Eiji Ôji	Nobunaga Shimazaki	Eric Vale
Eri	Kana Okazaki	Macy Anne Johnson
Tenho	Yukiya Hayashi	Grant Paulsen

== Production and release ==
The anime series was directed by Kazuya Ichikawa with screenplay adapted from the game by Midori Gotō. Tetsuya Nomura and Gen Kobayashi designed the characters, and Takeharu Ishimoto composed the series' music. The game's producer Tomohiko Hirano and director Tatsuya Kando were supervising. According to Kando, there had always been intent to create an anime series from the game, but there was no time or budget at the time of the game's release. Early thoughts by Kando were positive based on how similar the storyboards were to the original game. Ichikawa wanted the anime to be recognized as his masterpiece. The original cast returned for the anime, with Koki Uchiyama voicing protagonist Neku Sakuraba.

A preview of the first episode for the anime was released on September 18, 2020, alongside announcements of online campaigns to promote the series. As more than a decade had passed between the release of the original game and the anime adaptation, some elements of the game were modernized for the anime series, such as the use of smartphones rather than flip phones. The opening theme is "Twister -Animation OP ver.-" performed by MJR, while the ending theme is "Carpe Diem" performed by Asca. The opening theme was originally scheduled to be "Teenage City Riot" by ALI, but was replaced just prior to the series' airing following the arrest of the band's drummer Kahadio over an alleged refund scam. It aired worldwide from April 10 to June 26, 2021, through Funimation, as well as the Super Animeism block on MBS and TBS. (Note: MBS and TBS listed the series premiere at 25:25 on April 9, 2021, which is effectively 1:25 a.m. JST on April 10.)

An English dub of anime series was made by Funimation featuring a different cast from the original game, premiering on September 17, 2021. Following Sony's acquisition of Crunchyroll, the series was moved to this service.

=== Episode list ===
No.	Title (Note: All English titles are taken from Funimation.)	Directed by (Note: Information is taken from the ending credits of each episode.)	Written by	Original release date
1	"The Reapers' Game"; Transliteration: "Shinigami Gēmu" (Japanese: 死神ゲーム)	Akane Shimizu	Midori Gotō	April 10, 2021
A boy named Neku Sakuraba finds himself in the middle of what appears to be Shibuya, discovering that he is on a plane known as the Underground, separate from the Realground regular people are on. Upon receiving a mission on his phone telling him to reach the 104 Building or else face erasure, monsters known as Noise attack Neku. A girl named Shiki Misaki saves him, and they form a pact, granting him the ability to use "Psychs" to defeat the Noise. With Neku having no memory of how he ended up where he is, Shiki explains that they are taking part in the Reapers' Game, in which they must complete missions and survive for seven days. On the second day, as Neku learns from Shiki that he can read the minds of non-players, they meet two other Players, Daisukenojo "Beat" Bito and his partner Rhyme, who assist them in fighting more Noise. Neku becomes negatively affected by the Noise's influence, and Reapers Uzuki Yashiro and Kouki Kariya attempt to trick Neku, who has amnesia, into killing Shiki but are stopped by a mysterious man. As Neku apologises to Shiki for his actions, they are assisted by band 777 to find and defeat the Noise creature, Vespertilio Canor.
2	"Shiki"; Transliteration: "Shiki" (Japanese: シキ)	Akane Shimizu	Midori Gotō	April 17, 2021 (Note: This episode aired at 1:40 a.m. JST, 15 minutes after the original air time.)
On the fourth day, Shiki tells Neku about her friend Eri, who helped her design clothes, before the two help some squabbling friends in the Realground that are causing Noise to spawn make up with each other. It is then that they come across a Realground girl who looks identical to Shiki. Shiki reveals the girl to be Eri herself, whose appearance Shiki took on as her fee for the Reapers' Game, theorising that Neku's memories were his entry fee. The next day, the pair are faced with another mission which requires them to make use of a celebrity to get everyone to watch an advertisement for Red Skull pins, which has an unnerving effect on the audience. They then once again encounter Eri mourning over Shiki, leading Shiki to reveal to Neku that the Reapers' Game is a game in which people who have died must survive to come back to life.
3	"Erased"; Transliteration: "Shōmetsu" (Japanese: 消滅)	Akane Shimizu	Midori Gotō	April 24, 2021
On the sixth day, Neku and the others tackle what appears to be a simple mission. However, this causes them to let their guard down, leading Rhyme to be erased when she jumps in to protect Beat from a Noise sent by Uzuki and Kariya. As the man from before, Sanae Hanekoma, takes care of a mortified Beat, Neku and Shiki face the seventh and final day and go up against the Game Master, Yodai Higashizawa. Managing to defeat him, Neku and Shiki are approached by the superior Reaper, Megumi Kitaniji, who reveals that only Shiki is allowed to return to life. When Neku agrees to take part in the Reapers' Game again, Kitaniji takes Shiki hostage as Neku's new entry fee.
4	"Reapers"; Transliteration: "Shinigami" (Japanese: 死神)	Rie Takahashi	Midori Gotō	May 1, 2021
Starting the Reapers' Game anew, Neku is forced to form a pact with a mysterious boy named Joshua Kiryu. Unlike the other Players, Neku finds he can scan Joshua, showing him glimpses of the memories he had lost. The pair soon meet the new Game Master, Sho Minamimoto, who starts turning the other players against each other. The next day, as the resurgence of his memories leads Neku to become warier of Joshua, the pair face off against a new powerful form of Noise known as Taboo Noise coming from Minamimoto's art pieces. After observing Eri as she buys flowers for Shiki, Neku once again scans Joshua, showing him a vision of his death in Udagawa. Before Neku can ask any questions out of Joshua, Beat appears before them as a Reaper.
5	"CAT"	Yudai Oikawa, Erina Seki	Midori Gotō	May 8, 2021
Joshua brings Neku to the Wildkat café run by Hanekoma, where he explains that he came from the Realground willingly to take part in the Reapers' Game. After receiving upgrades to their phones from Hanekoma, the pair notice that the Red Skull pins from earlier are spreading fast. Later on, as Neku and Joshua help 777 locate a missing microphone to access other areas, more Taboo Noise start to appear, attacking not only Players but the Reapers as well. After helping Uzuki and Kariya to deal with the Taboo Noise, Neku and Joshua go to Udagawa, where another scan suggests that Joshua was the one who killed Neku.
6	"Turf"; Transliteration: "Teritorī" (Japanese: テリトリー)	Akane Shimizu, Erina Seki, Rie Takahashi	Midori Gotō	May 15, 2021
Reluctantly having to continue being Joshua's partner despite having allegedly been killed by him, Neku spots Minamimoto drawing mysterious graffiti on the floor, which Kariya identifies as a Taboo Noise Refinery. After facing up against Noise spawning from graffiti, Neku once again clashes with Beat, who leaves behind a pendant belonging to Rhyme after the other Reapers drag him away. As Neku receives some words of encouragement from another pair of Players, Sota and Nao, he learns from Joshua that Hanekoma is CAT, the graffiti artist he admires. Later, after Neku and Joshua fight off more Taboo Noise, Kariya reveals that Joshua is playing the Reapers' Game while still alive, upsetting Neku. Meanwhile, Minamimoto prepares for the culmination of his week-long plan.
7	"Joshua"; Transliteration: "Yoshua" (Japanese: ヨシュア)	Yudai Oikawa	Midori Gotō	May 22, 2021
On day 6, Neku and Joshua are tasked with beating bosses as part of their mission, once again choosing to help Kariya and Uzuki fight off some Taboo Noise along the way. On the final day, Uzuki repays her favor by assisting Neku, who returns Rhyme's pendant to Beat. Upon confronting Minamimoto, Neku regains more of his memory, showing that the one Joshua shot was Minamimoto, who then allegedly shot Neku. Just as Neku and Joshua manage to defeat him, Minamimoto self-destructs himself, leading Joshua to sacrifice himself to protect Neku from the blast. Kitaniji once again appears before Neku, revealing he was the one who sent the last mission to stop Minamimoto's rampage. As a penalty for Joshua breaking the rules, Kitaniji forces Neku to play through the Reaper's Game one more time before he can save Shiki, stating that he won't be able to participate in future games.
8	"Emergency Call"; Transliteration: "Emājenshī Kōru" (Japanese: エマージェンシーコール)	Rie Takahashi, Akane Shimizu	Midori Gotō	May 29, 2021
Finding that he is the only player taking part in this game, Neku is defenseless against Kariya and Uzuki until Beat steps in and becomes his partner. Beat explains that Hanekoma managed to piece together Rhyme's soul and bring her back as a Noise and that he became a Reaper in the hopes of becoming the new Composer and returning her to normal. As Neku and Beat search for the current Composer's whereabouts, they are confronted by the third Game Master, Mitsuki Konishi, who captures Rhyme as Beat's entry fee for becoming a Player. The next day, Konishi issues her sole mission, to find and defeat her within the remaining six days, before using an Emergency Call to order all the Reapers, who are powered up with "O-Pins", to erase Neku and Beat. Heading into O-East to find Konishi, the pair are forced to fight against 777, who gives them their Key Pin after they defeat him before Konishi erases him for going easy on them.
9	"Rhyme and Beat"; Transliteration: "Raimu to Biito" (Japanese: ライムとビイト)	Yu Cheon Kim, Wu Ginsu, Miyuki Kaieda	Midori Gotō	June 5, 2021
Beat reveals to Neku that Rhyme is his little sister, who died alongside him following a car accident and lost her memory of him upon arriving in the Underground. Resuming their search for Konishi, Neku and Beat find themselves unable to scan Realgrounders, noticing that they're all wearing Red Skull pins. After the two protect Eri from Noise spawning from the negative demand over Red Skull pins, Kariya and Uzuki challenge them to fight them to retrieve Rhyme. Kariya and Uzuki admit defeat, only to find that the Rhyme Konishi had given them was a decoy. Giving Neku and Beat their keypin as a consolation prize, Kariya and Uzuki are soon hit by the side effects of the O-Pins, which take control of them. Meanwhile, Hanekoma completes an unfinished Refinery, which resurrects Minamimoto.
10	"The Countless Wrongs of Our Day"; Transliteration: "Kazoe Kirenai Kono Yo no Fukō" (Japanese: 数えきれないこの世の不幸)	Yudai Oikawa, Kanako Yajima	Midori Gotō	June 12, 2021
Neku and Beat discover that almost all of Shibuya's citizens, including Reapers, are being brainwashed by the Red Skull pins, but Neku remains insistent that Hanekoma isn't the Composer. As the two find the summoning circle and discover through the camera app that Hanekoma was allegedly the one who drew it, they are attacked by the brainwashed Kariya and Uzuki but manage to stop them by removing their O-Pins. Heading to Hanekoma's café to find it destroyed, using the photo app to discover a keypin Hanekoma had left behind allowing them to enter a secret lair beneath Shibuya River. Before they can get there, however, they are confronted by the resurrected Minamimoto, whose body has been transformed into a Taboo Noise to take on the Composer. Overpowering Neku and Beat, Minamimoto heads into Shibuya River to confront the Composer, with Neku and Beat following soon afterwards.
11	"The Hour of Reckoning"; Transliteration: "Shinpan no Toki" (Japanese: 審判の刻)	Erina Seki, Yudai Oikawa	Midori Gotō	June 19, 2021
Neku and Beat catch up to Minamimoto, who reveals that Konishi had been hiding inside Beat's shadow the entire time. She allows Minamimoto to go ahead to confront the compose while she fights against Neku and Beat. Refusing to let Neku die, Beat musters up the power to rescue Rhyme, who helps him and Neku find Konishi's weak point and defeat her. Before she is erased, Konishi reveals that Rhyme's memories were Beat's entry fee, after which Shiki appears and deduces that Rhyme's actual fee was her dreams. Upon discovering Minamimoto has been beaten, the four soon find themselves in the Room of Reckoning, where Kitaniji brainwashes Shiki and transforms himself into a dragon. Neku manages to beat Kitaniji and free Shiki from his control, only to discover that Kitaniji himself is a Player, whose desire to create a blissful world attract Noise that transforms him into an even more powerful form.
12	"It's a Wonderful World"; Transliteration: "Subarashiki Kono Sekai" (Japanese: すばらしきこのせかい)	Arisa Matsuura	Midori Gotō	June 26, 2021
Combining their strengths, Neku, Shiki, and Beat manage to defeat Kitaniji's dragon form. The three move on ahead to confront the Composer who, to everyone's surprise, turns out to be Joshua, who reveals that he had been playing a game with Kitaniji over whether Shibuya is reformed or destroyed. Joshua then returns Neku's full memories, revealing that he was the one who killed Neku to send him to the Underground and have him aid his goal of destroying Shibuya. Joshua challenges Neku to a gun showdown with Shibuya's fate on the line, to which Neku decides to place his trust in Joshua and allow himself to get shot. Neku then awakens in the real Shibuya, with Beat, Rhyme and Shiki also being brought back to life. As Neku and the others meet each other in the Realground for the first time, Hanekoma converses with Joshua, who chose not to destroy Shibuya after seeing Neku's trust in him.

== Reception ==
Anime News Network published a feature article authored by The Cartoon Cipher in June 2021, which analyzed in detail the differences between the original 2007 video game, and the first three episodes of the anime adaptation. Kaile Hultner from Polygon found that the anime is helpful as it provides "vital context" delivered in a concise manner for the extensive amount of in-universe terminology employed by the 2021 video game sequel, Neo: The World Ends With You. Alex Lukas from CBR praised the anime adaptation's fluid animation and faithful recreation of the source material's distinctive art style. He criticized the pacing issues of its early episodes, which gave him the impression that it is meant to be little more than a promotional effort for the then-upcoming Neo: The World Ends With You.

Anime Feminist criticized the gory deaths of several of its protagonists for three of them not being enough time to mourn properly, something casual viewers would be confused in general as a result of the pacing in comparison to the original game. Nevertheless, the writers recommended the anime to both casual and gaming fans as a result of how the anime properly develops the characters after such violent episodes.
