= Morgan Lauré Garrett =

American voice actress (born 1985)

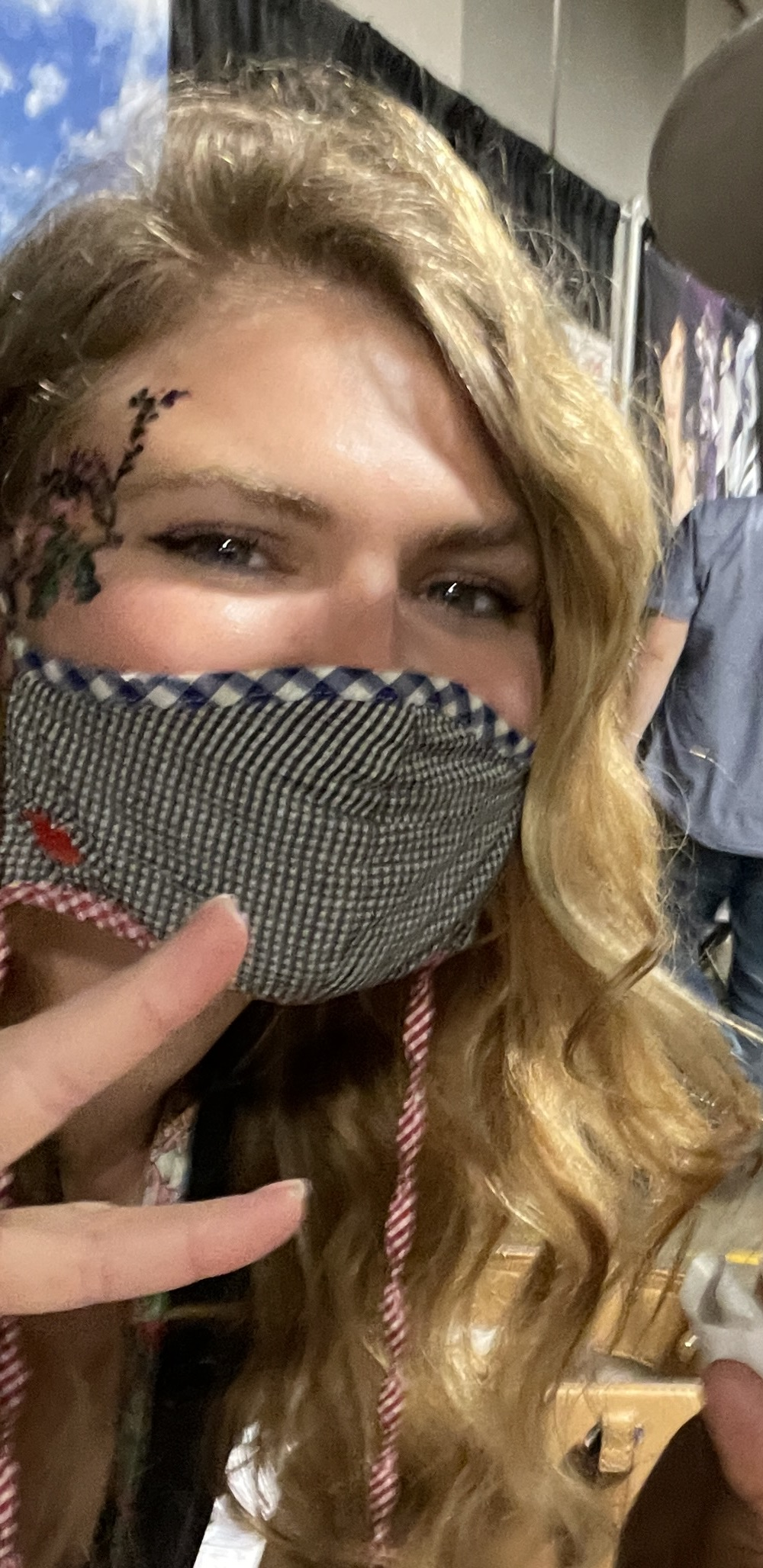
- Garrett in 2022
- Born: September 4, 1985 (age 41)
- Other name: Mandy Lane
- Education: Texas A&M University–Commerce; Southern Methodist University
- Occupation: Voice actress
- Years active: 2011–present
- Website: www.morganlaure.com

Morgan Lauré Garrett (born September 4, 1985) is an American voice actress. She won the Behind the Voice Actors' Breakthrough Voice Actor of the Year Award in 2012. Her major roles include Seraphim in the Is This a Zombie? series, Kaori Kanzaki in the A Certain Magical Index series, Mao Kisaragi in Psycho-Pass 3, Twoearle in Gonna be the Twin-Tail!!, Rico Brzenska in the Attack on Titan series, Akira Mado in the Tokyo Ghoul series and Tina in the Toriko series. Garrett is also known for providing the voice of Rei Todoroki in My Hero Academia.

== Filmography ==
=== Anime ===
List of English dubbing performances in anime
Year	Title	Role	Notes	Source
2012	Fafner in the Azure: Heaven and Earth	Canon Hazama		
2012	Is This a Zombie? series	Seraphim		
2012	A Certain Magical Index series	Kaori Kanzaki		
2012	One Piece	Tyrannosaurus, Mozu, Sabo (Young)	Funimation dub	
2013	Tenchi Muyo! War on Geminar	Chiaia Flan		
2013	High School DxD	Yubelluna	as Mandy Lane	
2013	Maken-ki! series	Azuki Shinatsu		
2013	Toriko	Tina, Peacheetah		
2013	Sankarea: Undying Love	Chihiro Furuya	Child, Ep. 7, 11	
2014	Attack on Titan series	Rico Brzenska		
2014	Ben-To	Ayame Shaga		
2014	Code:Breaker	Yuki Sakurakoji		
2015	Wanna Be the Strongest in the World	Kurea Komiyama		
2015	Assassination Classroom	Megu Kataoka	Also Koro-sensei Q!	
2015	D-Frag!	Tsutsumi Inada		
2015	Death Parade	Castra		
2015	Dragonar Academy	Primrose Shelley		
2015	Heavy Object	Frolaytia Capistrano		
2015	Hyperdimension Neptunia: The Animation	Rei		
2015	Laughing Under the Clouds	Botan		
2015	Riddle Story of Devil	Karami Azuma		
2015	Tokyo Ghoul √A	Akira Mado		
2015	World Break: Aria of Curse for a Holy Swordsman	Angela Johnson		
2016	Lord Marksman and Vanadis	Sofya Obertas		
2016	No-Rin	Torao Kanegami		
2016	Brothers Conflict	Kaori Kishida	Eps. 2-3	
2016	Dimension W	Toshiko Morinaga, Cedric Morgan	Eps. 4-5 (Toshiko Morinaga), Ep. 7 (Cedric Morgan)	
2016	The Empire of Corpses	Hadaly Lilith		
2016	Gonna be the Twin-Tail!!	Twoearle		
2016	Danganronpa 3: The End of Hope's Peak High School: Despair Arc	Akane Owari		
2016	The Disastrous Life of Saiki K.	Kurumi Saiki		
2016	Love Live! Sunshine!!	Dia Kurosawa		
2016	Joker Game	Marie Torres		
2016	The Vision of Escaflowne	Eries Aston	Funimation dub	
2017	Valkyrie Drive	Mirei Shikishima	as Mandy Lane	
2017	Aria the Scarlet Ammo AA	Hina Fūma		
2017	Akiba's Trip: The Animation	Kozakura		
2017	Interviews with Monster Girls	Sakie Satō		
2017	Tales of Zestiria the X	Ian		
2017	Masamune-kun's Revenge	Aki Adagaki		
2017	Gosick	Sophie		
2017	Chain Chronicle: The Light of Haecceitas	Rowendia		
2017	ēlDLIVE	Veronica Borowczyk		
2017	My Hero Academia	Rei Todoroki		
2017	Akashic Records of Bastard Magic Instructor	Celica Arfonia		
2017	Seven Mortal Sins	Asmodeus		
2017	Tsukigakirei	Ayane Mizuno		
2017	Samurai Warriors	Inahime		
2017	KanColle: Kantai Collection	Mutsu		
2017	The Silver Guardian	Elle		
2017	Tsugumomo	Suzuri Sumeragi	Ep. 12	
2017	18if	Mana Hayashida		
2017	My First Girlfriend is a Gal	Ranko Honjō		
2017	Knight's & Magic	Helvi Oberi		
2017	Saiyuki Reload Blast	Lady Gyōkumen		
2017	Konohana Kitan	Kiri		
2017	GARO: Vanishing Line	Bickering Couple (Female)	Ep. 2	
2017	The Ancient Magus' Bride	Leanan Sídh	Ep. 9	
2017–2023	In Another World With My Smartphone	Yuel Urnea Belfast		
2018	Yamada-kun and the Seven Witches	Shoko	Eps. 2-4	
2018	Cardcaptor Sakura: Clear Card	Kaho Mizuki		
2018	Island	Kuon Ohara		
2018	Black Clover	Sol Marron		
2018	Tokyo Ghoul:re	Akira Mado		
2019	Boogiepop and Others	Nagi	12 episodes	
2019	Nichijou	Yuuko Aioi		
2019	Wise Man's Grandchild	Yuri Carlton		
2019	How Heavy Are the Dumbbells You Lift?	Ayaka Uehara		
2019–present	Arifureta: From Commonplace to World's Strongest	Tio Klarus		
2019–2021	Fruits Basket	Rina Sonomiya (ep12), Ayame & Yuki's Mother, Additional Voices		
2020	Bofuri	Misery		
2020	Kakushigoto	Hime Gotō		
2020	Deca-Dence	Kurenai		
2020	Gleipnir	Elena Aoki		
2021	Sleepy Princess in the Demon Castle	Harpy		
2021	86	Henrietta von Penrose		
2021	The World Ends with You: The Animation	Shiki		
2021	Deep Insanity: The Lost Child	Kobato		
2021–2022	How a Realist Hero Rebuilt the Kingdom	Juna Doma		
2021–2022	Seirei Gensouki: Spirit Chronicles	Aishia		
2022	Girls' Frontline	Intruder	Ep. 7	
2022	Requiem of the Rose King	Cecily		
2022	Heroines Run the Show	Juri		
2022	Love After World Domination	Misaki Jingūji (Yellow Gelato)		
2022	Shikimori's Not Just a Cutie	Ai Kamiya		
2022	Laid-Back Camp	Nadeshiko Kagamihara, Pinecone	Assistant ADR Director	
2022	JoJo's Bizarre Adventure: Stone Ocean	Miuccia Miuller		
2022	Lucifer and the Biscuit Hammer	Shea Moon		
2022	PuraOre! Pride of Orange	Kaoruko Yanagida		
2023	Tomo-chan Is a Girl!	Ferris Olston		
2023	My Home Hero	Kasen		
2023	A Place Further than the Universe	Kanae Maekawa		
2023	My Tiny Senpai	Yutaka Shinozaki		
2023	The Kingdoms of Ruin	Chloe		
2024	Viral Hit	Yeo Roo-mi		
2025	Dragon Ball Daima	Doctor Arinsu		
2025	Murai in Love	Ayano Tanaka		
2025	My Hero Academia: Vigilantes	Kuin Hachisuka/Queen Bee		
2025	Dealing with Mikadono Sisters Is a Breeze	Subaru		
2025	May I Ask for One Final Thing?	Scarlet		
2026	Overgeared	Yura		

=== Animation ===
List of voice performances in animation
Year	Title	Role	Notes	Source
2023	RWBY	Summer Rose		Morgan Lauré
2025	To Be Hero X	Queen		

=== Films ===
List of voice performances in films
Year	Title	Role	Notes	Source
2019	City Hunter: Shinjuku Private Eyes	Kaori Makimura	English dub	
2021	The Stranger by the Shore	Eri	English dub	

=== Video games ===
List of voice performances in video games
Year	Title	Role	Notes	Source
2018	Paladins: Champions of the Realm	Tyra		
2019	New Super Lucky's Tale	Lyra		
2023	Honkai: Star Rail	Guinaifen, Aglaea	As Morgan Lauré	
2021	HuniePop 2: Double Date	Jessie Maye	As Morgan Lauré	In-game credits
2024	Potionomics	Sylvia	As Morgan Lauré	In-game credits
2025	Zenless Zone Zero	Alexandrina Sebastiane	As Morgan Lauré; replaced Crystal Lee in version 1.7	
TBA	Muv-Luv: Project MIKHAIL	Michiru Isumi		

== Awards ==
Year	Award	Category	Result
2012	BTVA Voice Acting Award	Breakthrough Voice Actor of the Year	Won
