= Neku Sakuraba =

- Neku in The World Ends with You
- First game: The World Ends with You (2007)
- Created by: Tatsuya Kando
- Designed by: Tetsuya Nomura
- Voiced by: Koki Uchiyama (Japanese), Jesse David Corti (English)

Neku Sakuraba (Japanese: 桜庭 音操, Hepburn: Sakuraba Neku; ネク Neku) is a fictional character introduced in the 2007 Nintendo DS video game The World Ends with You by Square Enix. Under mysterious circumstances, he finds himself participating in the Reapers' Game and is forced to fight for his life, teaming up with a girl named Shiki Misaki. He allies himself with several other characters. The character has also been featured in the game's sequel Neo: The World Ends with You, the animated adaptation of the original game, and Kingdom Hearts 3D: Dream Drop Distance.

Game director Tatsuya Kando created Neku Sakuraba aware of how the protagonist might not be initially likable but would grow on the audience. Tetsuya Nomura designed him, having taken a liking to the clothing he gives him and eventually deciding to include him in Kingdom Hearts 3D: Dream Drop Distance in later years. His return in the sequel Neo: The World Ends with You was carefully written to avoid him having steal the spotlight of the new protagonist Rindo, whom he aids in the final parts of the game. Nomura was also careful with how to design the older Neku. He is voiced by Koki Uchiyama in Japanese and Jesse David Corti in English.

Since appearing in The World Ends with You, Neku has received mostly positive reception. While some multiple writers have criticized his brooding and antisocial personality, comparable to other characters created by Square Enix, his character arc in the original video game was praised by critics, especially when interacting with fellow characters Shiki and Joshua. His guest role in the crossover franchise Kingdom Hearts and the animated adaptation also received positive response.

== Appearances ==
=== The World Ends with You ===
In Neo: The World Ends with You, Neku was redesigned to look more heroic.

In The World Ends with You, Neku lives in Shibuya and is transported to an alternate version of it after being killed. He is an antisocial teenage boy who claims he does not "get" people, and rarely interacts with others. There, he is forced to participate in the "Reapers' Game" or face erasure, having to solve daily missions for one week to escape the Game. He has few memories, as they were taken as his entry fee, and awakens in the middle of Scramble Crossing. Initially, he is forced into a pact with a girl named Shiki Misaki after meeting her at the statue of Hachiko. He also teams up with Yoshiya Kiryu, who goes by Joshua; Daisukenojo Bito, who goes by Beat; Raimu Bito, who goes by Rhyme and is Beat's sister; and Sanae Hanekoma, an artist acting as a coffee shop owner.

Neku eventually learns that Joshua, his partner and secretly the Composer of the Game, killed him while shooting at the Game Master Sho Minamimoto, thus placing him in the Game to fight for the right to be revived. He is forced to replay the game two more times and ends up being one of the last Players in the Game. He battles the Conductor, Megumi Kitaniji, who attempted to modify peoples' minds and create a perfect world. Afterwards, Joshua reveals that he chose Neku to be his proxy in his challenge with Kitanji over whether he would succeed. However, Neku is unable to attack Joshua, who remains the Composer and returns he and his friends' lives to normal.

The Final Remix version of the game adds new storyline content taking place after the main game. Neku and Beat awaken in a geographically distorted alternate version of Shibuya and are assigned a mission to escape it within 24 hours. Accompanied by a Reaper named Coco Atarashi, the two traverse through the alternate Shibuya while encountering Shiki and Rhyme. As they progress, Neku has visions of a city being destroyed and a strange girl with Shiki's stuffed animal, as well as what are seemingly distorted flashbacks of his death and Rhyme's sacrifice. Neku and Beat arrive at Mr. Hanekoma's café, and he reveals that the Shibuya they have been traversing is a giant Noise Coco created. Neku and Beat defeat the Noise and return to reality.

=== Other appearances ===
In the sequel Neo: The World Ends with You, Neku is known as a legendary veteran player who works behind the scenes to save Shibuya. When Beat is about to be killed by the former Reaper Sho Minamimoto, Neku appears in Shibuya and saves his friend. Following Minamimoto's departure, Neku agrees to keep working to stop the Reapers who want to erase the lands. Afterwards, he becomes member of the new protagonist Rindo's group, the Wicked Twisters. Following their victory, Neku goes back to his daily life meeting Shiki again in the epilogue.

Neku makes his debut appearance in the Kingdom Hearts series in Kingdom Hearts 3D: Dream Drop Distance, making him the first character to appear in the franchise who is from neither the Disney nor Final Fantasy franchises.

== Concept and creation ==
Tatsuya Kando, director of The World Ends with You, described Neku as a character who prefers to be left alone, yet feels lonely and wants to interact with others. As the story of The World Ends With You deals with Neku's growth as a character, the developers had to focus on his development, such as how he would feel, what thoughts lie behind his actions, how he interacts with other characters and is affected by them, and how the people around him feel about him. These elements were focused on to make a more believable story. The developers included aspects and daily concerns, hoping that they could be things that players would have to deal with in their personal lives, and may be able to relate with Neku and feel like they are a part of the game. They also hoped that this would help players develop an understanding and tolerance for Neku's actions, which could help players feel more comfortable with controlling someone who does not act how they would like them to. Neku is voiced by Koki Uchiyama in Japanese and Jesse David Corti in the English localization.

Since the game was originally seen as a game with team battles, Neku and Shiki were written as leaders for opposing teams. Psychokinesis was originally Neku's only ability, but it was changed in favor of hack and slash skills. The opening and ending scenes were designed to contrast one another and have Neku understand that Joshua deceived him, but he is now surrounded by multiple people. Kando said that, as Neku and his friends were at the center of the story in the original game and thus became highly popular, they were afraid they would overshadow Rindo's group. As a result, they were careful with how to approach them. In order to keep Neku and the others from becoming too central to the story, Kando decided to have Beat play the role of connecting both installments, with Neku appearing close to the end as a supporting character. Nomura decided to keep their roles a secret from the fans before its release. Kando considered establishing that Beat had taken on Neku's name. However, as the story continued to take shape, it was changed so that others instead mistook him for Neku.

Since the game Kingdom Hearts 3D: Dream Drop Distance was created by the same development team, which contained members who worked on The World Ends with You, the Square Enix group decided to use Neku and other characters from said game in place of Final Fantasy characters. Neku was included in Dream Drop Distance to come across as Sora's new mentor in Traverse Town.

=== Design ===
The protagonist was given headphones to symbolize his distance from others. Tetsuya Nomura knew Neku would be drawn in pixel art, so he gave him headphones and bright orange hair to make him stand out. The sound of "Neku", which the artist often used as a pseudonym in his proposals, was the reason for his name. Neku was originally going to be Shiki's underling. Neku wears the Jupiter of Monkey brand, which the artist considers to be the most important part of his design, with his successor Rindo wearing the same brand. Both leads are based on the Japanese saying, "see not, hear not, and speak not". With Neku, his signature feature was his big headphones, a concept tied to "hear no evil". For the animated adaptation of The World Ends With You, the staff found the idea of showing Beat and Neku's Fusion move to be a challenge to animate.

Since Neo takes place three years after the first game and the narrative emphasizes that Neku was absent from Shibuya, it would make no sense for him to wear the same outfit. As a result, Tetsuya Nomura came up with a new design to give him a more heroic look, a pragmatic silhouette which appealed to director Tatsuya Kando who found it cool. In Neo, the clothes Neku wears are from the brand Gatto Nero, which fellow character Shaka also wears. Nomura commented that it was difficult to surpass Neku's first design from the original game. Although Neku appears in Neo, the Square Enix staff decided to focus its story on a completely new set of characters led by Rindo. As a result, when the first game received an update, the developers decided to create a new episode that connects both games. They considered ideas for characters from both installments to fight one another.

== Reception ==
=== Critical response ===
Since appearing in The World Ends with You, Neku's character attracted mixed responses. Crispy Gamer editor Steve Steinberg regarded him as a common antisocial RPG youth often used by developers. His brooding personality and youth was made comparable to other Final Fantasy series characters such as Cloud Strife, Vaan, and Squall Leonhart, and that the story needs developing. GameZone editor Stephen Woodward described him as a "regular spunky, spikey ha×ired protagonist", adding that he was one of the most emo protagonists ever created. The New York Times editor Charles Herald, however, stated that he was not just an angsty teenager, and that the title of the game refers to his need to expand his horizons through self-examination and working with and learning from others. Kotaku said that while the character develops in the final chapter, he is still highly unlikable especially in the first days where writer Alex Walker wanted the character to be erased. His design drew comparisons to Kingdom Hearts' protagonist Sora; Atomic Gamer editor Matt Cabral cited his baggy pants, spiky hair, and oversized shoes.TheGamer also said that Neku's original design from The World Ends with You was the best outfit in the duology due to the Jupiter of Monkey clothing brand, which is appealing due to the symbolism of the protagonist's arc and can also be bought in the sequel.

In an article centered around RPG characters, RPGamer praised his special moves, which come from pins, and that he stands out for being awkward to deal with in a group of characters. GameRant noted that Neku suffering amnesia is a common plot device that multiple RPG characters suffer from, with Neku becoming heroic in the narrative of the game as he meets more characters. JC Fletcher from EndGadget found Neku to have one of the weirdest introductions in gaming due to the nature of the game's narrative. His relationship with Shiki was praised by Nintendo Power due to their contrasting personalities that allow them to depend on each other across the game, giving them potential to start a romance during the ending. Anime Feminist criticized how Shiki is sacrificed so that Neku can participate in the game again, something which he felt came across as sexist, especially with how it is only done for Neku's sake. The Escapist in particular liked the relationship Neku develops with the antagonist Joshua due to their contrasting personalities, which makes the former come across as growing, especially in the second week of the game. The final twist that Joshua was manipulating Neku and was responsible for his death also appealed to the writer, since the villain is moved by the protagonist's growth which subverts the other antagonist's interactions, such as Kefka Palazzo from Final Fantasy VI, whose desire to become a god became a trope in role-playing games.

The character's inclusion in Kingdom Hearts 3D: Dream Drop Distance was also praised by Chris Antista from GamesRadar, who found it to be appealing fanservice through his interactions with the protagonist Sora, especially because of the possibility of other Square Enix games appearing in the series. Before the release of Neo, GameInformer saw that trailers teased the possible return of Neku but claimed that he might not "steal the spotlight" from the new characters, as the Wicked Twisters appeared to be the most promising characters appearing in the sequel.

=== Analysis ===
In "Toward a Gameic World: New Rules of Engagement from Japanese Video Games", B. Whaley describes Neku as an insecure shut-in, better known as hikikomori in Japan. Neku's personality is a subversion of common modern Japanese RPG characters, with his character arc helping him to forget his fears and become able to appreciate human life. In order to achieve such a goal, Neku interacts with characters who are archetypes of the chūnibyō involving the youth ignored by society. He said the game can be seen as "gameic social narrative commenting on hikikomori and the broader issues surrounding youth culture in contemporary Japan". The gameplay allows the audience to engage in strategies against social withdrawal in new forms of sociotopographical play. While the word hikikomori is never said in the game, the main cast can easily be seen as such, like when Neku criticizes the idea of friendship, which saddens Shiki. A common theme seen when Neku is with Shiki and Joshua is the idea of everyone manipulating one another for their own sake. However, with Shiki's aid, throughout the game Neku is able to overcome his insecurities and stop acting like a hikikomori.

AV Club said that the gameplay of The World Ends with You helps to develop the protagonist, as he is forced to work with others and socialize despite disliking the idea, wearing headphones to distance himself from them. When it came to the adaptation of the video game, Cartoon Cipher from Anime News Network said that the point of the anime is making Neku realize the importance of the world in which he lives, which makes his early appearances relatable due to his highly antisocial personality, which is easy for viewers to mock. However, his character arc was praised for being rewarding like in the game, as he has multiple interactions with the supporting cast, such as Shiki. These relationships help Neku to better appreciate teamwork and people in general. The character's special skills using pins was praised by Cipher for being executed in animation.
