= Lullaby for You =

Single by Jyongri
- Released: December 13, 2006
- Recorded: 2007
- Genre: Pop / J-Pop
- Length: N/A
- Label: EMI Music Japan
- Songwriter: Jyongri
- Producers: Jyongri and Jimmy Jam & Terry Lewis

Jyongri singles chronology
"Hop, Step, Jump!" (2007)	"Lullaby for You" (2006)	"Kissing Me" (2008)

"Lullaby for You" is Jyongri's third single released in Japan under the label EMI Music Japan on December 13, 2006. It peaked at No. 8 on the Oricon Daily Charts, and at No. 12 on the Oricon Weekly Charts. The A-side track, "Lullaby for You" is used in the end credits for the video game The World Ends with You. The B-side track "Catch Me" was produced by American producers Jimmy Jam and Terry Lewis.

== Track listing ==
1. Lullaby for You
2. Catch me (produced by Jimmy Jam & Terry Lewis)
3. Lovers DRIVE
4. ~Yakusoku~ Live Version (~約束~; ~Promise~)
5. Lullaby for You (Instrumental)
6. Catch me (Instrumental)
7. Lovers DRIVE (Instrumental)
