= Kingdom Hearts 3D: Dream Drop Distance =

2012 video game

- European box art
- Developer: Square Enix 1st Production Department
- Publisher: Square Enix
- Directors: Tetsuya Nomura; Tai Yasue
- Producer: Rie Nishi
- Programmers: Tamotsu Goto; Masashi Nakamichi
- Artists: Tetsuya Nomura; Gen Kobayashi; Takeshi Fujimoto
- Writers: Masaru Oka; Tetsuya Nomura
- Composers: Yoko Shimomura; Takeharu Ishimoto; Tsuyoshi Sekito
- Series: Kingdom Hearts
- Platform: Nintendo 3DS
- Release: JP: March 29, 2012; EU: July 20, 2012; AU: July 26, 2012; NA: July 31, 2012
- Genre: Action role-playing
- Modes: Single-player, multiplayer

Kingdom Hearts 3D: Dream Drop Distance (Note: Kingdom Hearts 3D: Dream Drop Distance (キングダム ハーツ 3D [ドリーム ドロップ ディスタンス], Kingudamu Hātsu Surīdī [Dorīmu Doroppu Disutansu])) is a 2012 action role-playing game developed and published by Square Enix for the Nintendo 3DS. The seventh installment in Disney's Kingdom Hearts series, it was released in Japan on March 29, 2012, Europe on July 20, 2012, Australasia on July 26, 2012, and in North America on July 31, 2012.

The game takes place after the events of Kingdom Hearts Re:coded, and focuses on Sora and Riku's Mark of Mastery exam, in which they have to protect parallel worlds in preparation for the return of Master Xehanort. Besides controlling the two playable characters across a single scenario, the player is able to recruit creatures known as Dream Eaters to assist them in fights.

The Square Enix staff decided to develop Dream Drop Distance after being impressed by the quality of the Nintendo 3DS. Taking advantage of the console's functions, they increased the action elements from the series based on the system previously seen in Kingdom Hearts Birth by Sleep. Additionally, both the gameplay and the plot are meant to give a glimpse of what the following title in the series, Kingdom Hearts III, would be like. The game has been well received in Japan and in the US, selling over 250,000, and 180,000 units on its debuts respectively. Critics generally praised the gameplay, and graphics, while criticizing aspects of the plot.

A high-definition remaster of the game entitled Kingdom Hearts Dream Drop Distance HD was released as part of the Kingdom Hearts HD 2.8 Final Chapter Prologue compilation for PlayStation 4, Xbox One, Windows, and Nintendo Switch.

== Gameplay ==
The game, which largely follows the action RPG and hack and slash gameplay of previous games in the series, sees players alternate between the roles of Sora and Riku, which is done via the 'Drop' system. During gameplay, a Drop Gauge gradually depletes over time, though it can be replenished with items. When the gauge completely empties, control will switch to the other character, though players may also opt to drop manually at any time. Drop Points, which are earned by defeating enemies and completing optional objectives, can be spent on bonuses that can be used until the next time the character drops, such as a slower Drop Gauge or increased attack or defense. The game reuses the Command Deck system from Birth by Sleep, in which players can customize a deck filled with various actions, spells, and items that can be quickly selected. There are also several new elements added to the gameplay. Flowmotion allows players to move quickly about by performing actions such as bouncing off walls, grinding on rails, and spinning around poles. Reality Shift is a system the player can use on certain objects or weakened opponents. It involves a touch-screen activated minigame unique to each world, which includes dragging the screen to fling a target like a catapult, touching hidden words to take control of enemies, and playing a rhythm-based minigame to cause fireworks to appear.

A battle in the game, featuring the Command Deck commands on the left side of the screen, and the two selected Spirits and the Drop meter on the right side. Sora is the character in use, with his health meter and character portrait at the bottom right.

One of the key elements of Dream Drop Distance is the inclusion of the Dream Eaters. Whilst they generally serve as the main enemies of the game, up to three good Dream Eaters, known as Spirits, can be recruited per character to assist them in battle. Spirits can be created by combining Dream Fragments with an item or spell, either via experimenting with combinations or using recipes found throughout the game. Characters can also link with Spirits to perform unique attacks. Along the way, the player can care for Spirits by petting them, feeding them items, or playing mini-games with them, which can unlock new abilities.

The game takes place across multiple worlds based on Pinocchio, The Hunchback of Notre Dame, Tron: Legacy, Fantasia, and Mickey, Donald, Goofy: The Three Musketeers, with each world having two different plots told from the perspectives of Sora and Riku. These worlds need to be completed by both Sora and Riku to unlock new worlds and progress through the game. Upon visiting each world for the first time, each character must go through a Dive section, in which characters freefall down a tube and must clear a certain objective, such as obtaining a certain number of points, defeating a certain number of enemies in a time limit, or defeating a boss character. In this mode, Sora and Riku can attack opponents, slow down their descent, or dodge attacks. They can also pick up magic spells which give them a limited supply of magical attacks to use against enemies.

Outside of the main game, players can play an additional mode called Flick Rush, which can be played alone or with another player via wireless multiplayer. In this mode, players battle with a team of three Spirits and pit them against each other. Players fight against their opponent by flicking up cards from the touchscreen. Each card has a number value determining its attack strength, with multiple cards combining to increase the overall value. The player whose attack value is greater than their opponent's gets to attack with their Spirit. A slowly replenishing meter determines how many cards the player can send out at a time, and each Spirit has a limited number of cards that can be replenished by swapping them out with another Spirit. The first player to eliminate all of their opponent's Spirits wins the game.

== Plot ==
=== Setting ===
Dream Drop Distance follows the events of Kingdom Hearts II and Kingdom Hearts Coded, though much of its plot is set concurrently to the original game via time travel. There are a total of seven playable worlds, most of which are based on various Disney properties, albeit in a "world submerged in sleep" due to being destroyed by the Heartless. Most of the Disney worlds introduced are entirely new, including worlds La Cité des Cloches, The Grid, Prankster's Paradise, Country of the Musketeers, and Symphony of Sorcery, based on The Hunchback of Notre Dame, Tron: Legacy, Pinocchio, Mickey, Donald, Goofy: The Three Musketeers, and Fantasia. The other two worlds, Traverse Town and the World That Never Was, are original to the series and have been featured in previous games. In addition, the game's opening tutorial is set on the Destiny Islands, another original world.

=== Characters ===
The game features Sora and Riku as the two main characters, taking part in a test to improve their skills with their weapon, the Keyblade. For most of the game, the two are depicted as they appear in the original game, while also being given new clothes. Their older selves from Kingdom Hearts II appear during cutscenes, while Sora is briefly playable in this incarnation during the end credits. A younger incarnation of Xehanort, first introduced as the optional "Mysterious Figure" boss from the North American and European releases of Kingdom Hearts Birth by Sleep, serves as the game's primary antagonist with his two revived alter egos: his Heartless, Ansem, and his Nobody, Xemnas. Several former members of Xemnas' Organization XIII, including Lea and Ansem the Wise's apprentices Braig, Dilan, Even, Aeleus, and Ienzo, return after being restored to their human forms.

Like previous games, Dream Drop Distance features various Disney characters, including Mickey Mouse, who is seen in the game in three different incarnations: his original characterization in the Kingdom Hearts series as the king of Disney Castle; a musketeer as featured in Mickey, Donald, Goofy: The Three Musketeers; and the young apprentice of Yen Sid shown in Fantasia. Donald Duck and Goofy make similar appearances as well. Characters hailing from their respective worlds play a small role in the main story, while Maleficent and Pete reprise their roles as antagonists, and Yen Sid as a supporting character. Unlike other major installments, which feature an extensive cast of Final Fantasy characters, only a Moogle appears. Dream Drop Distance features appearances of Neku Sakuraba, Joshua, Beat, Rhyme, and Shiki from the Square Enix title The World Ends with You, marking the first time that characters other than those from Disney and Final Fantasy have appeared in the series.

The game introduces a new type of creature called Dream Eaters, which come in two varieties—"Nightmares", which eat good dreams and create nightmares, and serve as enemies similar to the Heartless, Nobodies, and Unversed from previous games; and "Spirits", which eat nightmares and create good dreams, and also act as Sora and Riku's party members.

=== Story ===
Anticipating Master Xehanort's return, Yen Sid puts Sora and Riku through a Mark of Mastery exam to bestow them with the power necessary to rescue their missing allies and counter Xehanort. For the exam, they are sent to worlds that remain trapped in a "sleeping" state after being destroyed by the Heartless. There, they must unlock seven keyholes to fully restore them, and are advised to create benevolent "Spirit" Dream Eaters to guide them and battle the malevolent "Nightmare" Dream Eaters that infest the sleeping worlds. Yen Sid sends Sora and Riku back in time to their homeworld's destruction, allowing them to enter the sleeping worlds. The two are separated at the start of the test, each arriving in alternate versions of the worlds. Throughout the exam, Sora and Riku encounter a gray-haired youth who is accompanied by Xemnas and Ansem, respectively, despite them having been previously destroyed.

Upon completing the exam, Sora and Riku arrive in the World That Never Was instead of the realm of light. The youth reveals he and his associates have lured Sora into a trap and places him into a deep sleep, where his heart is consumed by darkness, but is encased within Ventus's armor for protection. Meanwhile, Riku learns he has spent the exam traveling through Sora's dreams as a Dream Eater. He escapes the dream and is confronted by the youth, who reveals himself to be Xehanort's past self, tasked by his present self with assembling thirteen incarnations of Xehanort from across time – including vessels of his fragmented heart – to form a new Organization XIII. Young Xehanort battles Riku to stall out time until his future self's revival. Despite Young Xehanort's defeat, a revived Master Xehanort appears and attempts to turn Sora into his final vessel, intending to pit his thirteen "seekers of darkness" against seven "guardians of light" to achieve his ultimate goal of recreating the χ-blade. He is foiled when Sora is rescued by Donald, Goofy, and Lea, the revived human form of Axel. Xehanort and his incarnations return to their original time periods, but assure that both factions will inevitably clash.

Upon returning to Yen Sid's tower, Riku re-enters Sora's dreams and releases his heart from Ventus's Nightmare-possessed armor. Riku then arrives in a simulation of Destiny Islands and meets a virtual copy of Ansem the Wise, who gives him research data he had left in Sora's heart to help Sora save those connected to it. After Riku returns to the realm of light and reunites with Sora, Yen Sid commends him for braving the realm of sleep a second time to reawaken Sora and declares him a Keyblade Master; Lea also reveals himself to have become a Keyblade wielder, and intends to become a Master as well. Sora is undaunted by his failure and returns to the sleeping worlds, where he thanks his Dream Eater companions.

In the game's secret ending, Yen Sid and Mickey discuss Xehanort's plan. Yen Sid reveals his intent to gather seven Keyblade wielders to prevent Xehanort from using the Princesses of Heart to forge the χ-blade, and to this end, he has Riku summon Kairi to be trained as a Keyblade wielder.

== Development ==
The game was created by the same development team that worked on Kingdom Hearts Birth by Sleep, then part of Square Enix's 1st Production Department. Since it contained members who worked for The World Ends with You, the group decided to use characters from said game in place of Final Fantasy characters. The decision to make a Kingdom Hearts game for the Nintendo 3DS was due to the positive impression the Square Enix staff had when viewing the console's quality. The console inspired Tetsuya Nomura to make the Dive Mode function where the character moves to different worlds without the use of a vehicle, while the Flowmotion was thought of prior to deciding which console use. The game's title was used to reference its various themes, with "Dream" referencing the storyline, "Drop" for the gameplay style, and "Distance" referring to the main characters' interaction, and, while unintentionally, the system's autostereoscopic 3D effect. Although Nomura admitted the English used was not grammatically correct, the team still decided to use it based on the way it sounded. Development was notably shorter than the ones from previous Kingdom Hearts games. However, co-director Tai Yasue emphasized how the finished product resembled Kingdom Hearts II and Birth by Sleep but improved.

The team wished for the game to have more action than the previous games. Nomura noted the similarities with Final Fantasy Versus XIII as a result of their similar styles. The new maneuvers employed in Dream Drop Distance are also meant to give a glimpse of how the next game in the series, Kingdom Hearts III, would look. New worlds were included in the game as a result of multiple requests by fans. The switches between player characters Sora and Riku across the game are meant to contrast the style from Birth by Sleep, which allowed the player to use three characters in their own campaigns, as well as explain the word "Distance" in the title because the two characters never interact across their stories. The Free Flow system was made using data from Birth by Sleep, which took nearly two weeks to obtain a form similar to the one from the game. The game originally intended to use returning Heartless and Nobodies as generic enemies. However, the setting gave the staff the idea of introducing new creatures, Dream Eaters, who would also join the player in fights. They were also inspired in part by Nintendogs + Cats—Nomura wished that his virtual dog could battle with other pets met through StreetPass and created the Dream Eaters based on this concept. They are used in the mini-game Flick Rush which originally intended to allow players to use a picture. Nomura did not approve of this idea.

With Kingdom Hearts Re:coded, the staff revealed that Dream Drop Distance would revolve around Sora and Riku's "Mark of Mastery" exam, but were worried about how to set it. The idea of Sora going through a dream was inspired by the subtitle of Kingdom Hearts: Birth by Sleep and served as a basis for the game. Sora and Riku were chosen as the playable characters in anticipation for the franchise's ending of the "Xehanort arc" as well as to represent the theme of "the light and the dark sides of hearts" which the two characters represent. The former's inclusion was also done due to the character's popularity in Japan. Nomura has stated that the themes of the game are trust and friendship, and that like Birth by Sleep, the story is on par with that of a numbered title. As a result of the game's plot, both Sora and Riku appear in their younger forms from the first Kingdom Hearts game. However, to avoid misconceptions that Dream Drop Distance was a remake of the original game, Nomura decided to change Sora's and Riku's outfits for most of the game. Despite using two protagonists, the game primarily focuses on Riku's growth across the series. When starting production, the staff had decided to make the story as complex as possible, leading to the inclusion of several cutscenes which can be viewed by the player anytime they want. In order to make it more accessible, scenario writer Masaru Oka was in charge of the Chronicles feature, which explains events from previous games. The game's story is also meant to connect directly with Kingdom Hearts III, although its original ending was not approved by the staff and was scrapped. Like previous titles, Dream Drop Distance has a secret ending that connects to Kingdom Hearts III although the staff found it unconventional in comparison to previous ones.

=== Promotion and release ===
The game was announced at the Electronic Entertainment Expo 2010 as "Kingdom Hearts 3D Demo" for the Nintendo 3DS. It was formally unveiled at the Square Enix 1st Production Department Premier event at the Toho Cinemas in Tokyo, Japan on January 18, 2011, with its first trailer along with its official name. During the game's development, Nomura explained that the games theme is trust, specifically how to trust others. In July 2011, a Famitsu article included an interview with Nomura in which he revealed that the game would have an unlockable secret movie. A playable demo released the same month also first featured the Dream Eaters as the player characters' partners and the game's generic enemy. A Dengeki issue featured another interview with Nomura, where he confirmed that he would be considering what he called an "HD Technical Test" to commemorate the series' tenth anniversary and to entice new players to the series. This occurred on March 3, 2012, in the form of a premiere event where footage from the game, including its full CGI introduction sequence, was showcased to celebrate the game's release.

The game was first released in Japan on March 29, 2012, and in North America and Europe on July 31, 2012, and July 20, 2012, respectively. In Australasia, it was released on July 26, 2012. A limited edition titled "Mark of Mastery" was also released in North America featuring twelve art cards, AR cards able to unlock new Dream Eaters, and a protector case for the 3DS console. While this has been noted to be the shortest gaps between the Japanese and English releases in the Kingdom Hearts, the latter version does not include new features not seen in the former. However, the Mark of Mastery limited edition was made so that English gamers would be able to obtain bonus material that can only be obtained in Japan. The game was also included within the "Kingdom Hearts 10th Anniversary Box" package made in commemoration of the franchise's 10th anniversary. The box also included the Nintendo DS games Kingdom Hearts 358/2 Days and Kingdom Hearts Re:coded. Nomura stated that Dream Drop Distance, unlike Kingdom Hearts, Kingdom Hearts II, and Birth by Sleep, would not receive an updated version.

A guidebook, Kingdom Hearts 3D: Dream Drop Distance Ultimania (キングダム ハーツ 3D [ドリーム ドロップ ディスタンス] アルティマニア), was published in Japan on May 1, 2012. Square Enix also published a light novel by Tomoko Kanemaki based on the game on June 28, 2012, under the title of "Side Sora". The second volume, titled "Side Riku", was released in Japan on September 27, 2012.

A HD remaster of the game for the PlayStation 4, titled Kingdom Hearts Dream Drop Distance HD, was announced in September 2015 at Tokyo Game Show to be part of the Kingdom Hearts HD 2.8 Final Chapter Prologue collection, which was released in January 2017. During the X019 event in London, Square Enix announced all Kingdom Hearts HD collections would release on the Xbox One in 2020.

=== Music ===
Like in Kingdom Hearts Birth by Sleep, the music for Kingdom Hearts 3D: Dream Drop Distance was a collaboration by Yoko Shimomura, Takeharu Ishimoto, and Tsuyoshi Sekito, containing musical compositions from all three. Among the songs included are tracks from The World Ends with You, originally composed by Ishimoto, who remixed them for Dream Drop Distance. Orchestral arrangements were provided by Kaoru Wada. The Kingdom Hearts Dream Drop Distance Original Soundtrack was released in Japan on April 18, 2012.

== Reception ==
Reception

Aggregate score
Aggregator	Score
Metacritic	75/100

Review scores
Publication	Score
1Up.com	C+
Famitsu	38/40
G4	4.5/5
Game Informer	8.25/10
GameSpot	7/10
GamesRadar+	4/5
GameTrailers	8.2/10
IGN	8.5/10
Nintendo Life	7/10
Nintendo Power	8/10
Nintendo World Report	9/10
Official Nintendo Magazine	84%

A playable demo featured on Tokyo Game Show earned the game top honors as "Best 3DS RPG" in RPG Land's Tokyo Game Show Awards, following a hands-on report that praised the boss fights. RPG Site also praised the game upon its first impression, calling the demo "refreshing". Reception to the game's released trailers, demos and general information was generally positive, and the game ranked among Famitsu's 25 "most wanted" list in October 2011. The Official Nintendo Magazine listed it eighth in their "Games of 2012" feature. In an IGN poll, it ranked as the most expected Nintendo 3DS game for 2012's summer. It also won the "Most Valuable Game Award" from the Nintendo Power magazine.

In its first review, Famitsu gave Dream Drop Distance a rating of 10/9/10/9, or a total of 38/40, in their March 22, 2012 issue, which made Dream Drop Distance the second highest rated game in the series for them, after Kingdom Hearts II. The game debuted at the top of Media Create's sales charts, selling 213,579 copies during its first week. The release was also noted to have helped boost the sales of the Nintendo 3DS console. Although the number of pre-orders surpassed that of Kingdom Hearts 358/2 Days for the Nintendo DS, the first week's sales were lower. Nevertheless, Media Create noted that this was due to the comparison between the number of units sold between the Nintendo DS and the Nintendo 3DS during the time the games were released, with the former having sold more copies than the latter. The game continued to appear in Media Create's polls for the next several weeks, selling a total of 311,688 units as of May 2012. In North America, the game sold 200,000 units during August 2012, with 180,000 regular editions and 20,000 Mark of Mastery editions.

English publications have given Kingdom Hearts 3D moderately positive reviews, with lower scores than Japanese review outlets, generally praising the gameplay while criticizing the plot. It received an aggregated score of 75/100 on Metacritic. Game Informer writer Bryan Vore praised the new gameplay elements and, unlike other reviewers, how well the story handles the franchise's plot, especially as it was set after that of Kingdom Hearts II, unlike many of the other newer titles in the series. Audrey Drake from IGN echoed similar comments about the gameplay, but felt that the story was sometimes not very interesting. Mark Walton from GameSpot praised the combat systems and environment design, though he wished that the game did not force the player through the levels linearly and dismissed the plot as "labyrinth-like" with poor dialogue and confusing motivations. Bob Mackey of 1UP.com was harsher on the game than other reviewers; while he too found the plot incomprehensible, he also felt that the numerous game mechanics combined to form a confusing and frustrating system. The reviewer for GameTrailers had a different take, finding the combination of mechanics to form "the best battle system in the series to date" and was not as dismissive of the plot, though they did note that it required a lot of knowledge of previous games in the series to follow. Leah Jackson of G4 had one of the highest reviews for the game out of the major English review outlets; though she had similar praises and criticisms as other reviewers, she felt that the gameplay and graphics more than made up for the sometimes confusing plot.

== HD 2.8 Final Chapter Prologue ==
In the credits of Kingdom Hearts HD 2.5 Remix, clips of Dream Drop Distance were shown as well as the inclusion of a secret ending related to the game, hinting at a possible additional collection. In September 2015, Square Enix announced Kingdom Hearts HD 2.8 Final Chapter Prologue. The collection features an HD remaster of Dream Drop Distance as well as Kingdom Hearts χ Back Cover, a cinematic retelling of Kingdom Hearts χ that reveals new parts of the series' history, and Kingdom Hearts 0.2: Birth by Sleep – A Fragmentary Passage, a new game taking place after the events of the original Birth by Sleep, told from the perspective of Aqua. It was released on January 12, 2017, in Japan and January 24, 2017, for other countries.
