= Without You (Jyongri song) =

Single by Jyongri
- A-side: "Without You"
- B-side: "Story"
- Released: August 4, 2010
- Recorded: 2010
- Genre: Pop
- Length: 5:13
- Label: EMI Music Japan
- Songwriter: Jyongri

Jyongri singles chronology
"Muteki na Ai" (2009)	"Without You" (2010)

"Without You" is a song by Korean Japanese pop singer-songwriter Jyongri. It was released on August 4, 2010 as her ninth single. It is Jyongri's first CD single in one year, since the release of "Muteki na Ai" in August 2009. "Without You" was the Fuji TV drama Asu no Hikari wo Tsukame. The song was released as a ringtone on July 5, as was "Story" on July 18. "Without You" debuted at number 88 on the Japanese Oricon chart and charted for two weeks.

== Track listing ==
All tracks are written by Jyongri.

No.	Title	Length
1.	"Without You"	5:13
2.	"Story" (ストーリー)	3:39
3.	"Without You (Instrumental)"	5:13
4.	"Story (Instrumental)"	3:39
Total length:		17:44

== Charts ==
Chart	Peak position
Billboard Japan Hot 100	32
RIAJ Digital Track Chart	52
Oricon Weekly Chart	88

== Release history ==
Region	Date	Format	Label
"Without You"
Japan	July 5, 2010	Digital download	EMI Music Japan
"Story"
Japan	July 18, 2010	Digital download	EMI Music Japan
"Without You"
Japan	August 4, 2010	CD single, digital download	EMI Music Japan
