= Jyongri =

Zainichi Korean singer (born 1988)

- Also known as: Jyongri Toyoda
- Born: Cho Jyong-ri; August 30, 1988 (age 38)
- Origin: Minoh, Osaka, Japan
- Genres: Pop, R&B
- Occupations: Musician, singer-songwriter
- Years active: 2006–present
- Label: EMI Music Japan
- Website: emimusic.jp/artist/jyongri/

- Jyongri
- Hangul: 조종리
- Hanja: 趙鍾李
- RR: Jo Jongri
- MR: Cho Chongni

Jyongri (Korean: 조종리; born August 30, 1988) is a Japanese pop singer of Korean ancestry currently signed with EMI Music Japan.

== Biography ==
=== Background and early life ===
Jyongri attended Osaka International School, and is fluent in both English and Japanese. She began learning to play the piano at the age of eight. It was not until Jyongri was eleven when she decided to become a singer; she started writing her own lyrics at this age. In 2004, when she was fifteen years old, she attended a five-week-long summer program at the Berklee College of Music. During this period Jyongri started to write her own music. Jyongri started working on her musical activities in June 2006 after graduating from Osaka International School. Jyongri was a student in Waseda University, a popular choice among other famous celebrities around the world.

=== Close to Fantasy (2006–2007) ===
In September 2006, a music video for a ballad titled "Wherever" started airing on music video channels, despite the fact that JyongriI had not debuted yet. "Wherever" would later be featured on her debut album. In December, two months after enrolling into Waseda University, Jyongri released her debut single, "Possession/My All for You". The single, released on December 13, featured nine tracks in total, including instrumentals, remixes and a cappella tracks. The single debuted at No. 16 on the Oricon charts and so far has sold over 20,000 copies and remains her best selling single.

A second single "Hop, Step, Jump!" was quickly released two months later on February 21, 2007. "Hop, Step, Jump!" was not as successful as her debut single, ranking at No. 32 on the charts. Jyongri's debut album "Close to Fantasy" followed the single exactly a month after on March 31. The album was released in two versions, CD+DVD and CD only. The DVD section included all three of her previous A-side's music videos for "Possession", "My All for You" and "Hop, Step, Jump!" as well as the video for "Wherever" and a new video for "Getting Funky!" "Close to Fantasy" debuted at No. 25 on the Oricon charts, selling 8,552 copies in its first week.

=== Love Forever (2007–2008) ===
On July 25, 2007, Jyongri released her third single, "Lullaby for You". The title track was used as the theme song for the Square Enix game "The World Ends with You". One of the single's B-sides "Catch Me" was arranged by American producers Jimmy Jam and Terry Lewis, who have worked with the likes of Janet Jackson and Mariah Carey. Earlier in April a remix competition was started by Toshiba EMI for "Catch Me". The winner had their remix released as a digital single under the title "Catch Me (Trance Version)" on the same day as "Lullaby for You". The single peaked at No. 12 in its first week.

After a long delay, Jyongri released her fourth single "Kissing Me" six months later on January 30, 2008. The title track was used as ending theme for five TV programs in Japan. The single's B-side, "You're the One" was used as the ending theme for the TBS program "Yaradeki! Sekai Daichousen". The single featured an English version of her previous A-side "Lullaby for You" The single debuted at No. 11 on the Oricon chart and has since sold 11,513 copies.

Jyongri's next single was called "Unchanging Love: Kimi ga Ireba" and was released on June 4, 2008. "Unchanging Love: Kimi ga Ireba" was used as the ending theme for various TV programs around May to July 2008. "Unchanging Love: Kimi ga Ireba" debuted at #12 in Japan and has since sold a total of 21,496 copies. The single featured of cover of "Your Song", by Elton John. The single was soon followed by the release of Jyongri's second album "Love Forever" on July 2, 2008. The album outpeaked her debut album when it debuted at No. 17 on the Oricon chart. "Love Forever" sold 12,792 copies in its first week.

=== Recent activities (2008 onwards) ===
Jyongri released her sixth single, "Winter Love Story", on December 3, 2008. The title track was used as ending theme for various NTV programs from October to December 2008. The single featured two B-sides, "Tender Touch" and "Blue Destiny". "Tender Touch" had previously been released on her second album "Love Forever" as track two. "Blue Destiny" was the theme song for the movie "Yasashii Senritsu". "Winter Love Story" debuted at No. 31 on the Oricon chart.

On April 29, 2009, Jyongri released her next "Maybe Someday", which was used as the ending theme for NTV programs "Soukai Jouhou Variety Sukkiri!!" and "Countdown Document Byouyomi!" in April. "Special" is the CM song for DHC's "Platinum White Make-up Series", among other tie-ins. The single peaked at No. 23 in Japan and sold 4,290 in its first week. Jyongri will release her eighth single "Muteki na Ai" (無敵な愛) on August 19. The title track will be used as the theme song for the dorama "Maid Deka" starting from June 26. The single will feature a piano version of Jyongri's previous single "Maybe Someday".

After a nine-month break, Jyongri returned with the digital release of "Walking" in May 2010. Jyongri released her ninth single "Without You" on August 4, 2010.

She has since written songs for other artists.

== Discography ==
=== Albums ===
Year	Album information	Chart positions	Sales
Year	Album information	JAP	Sales
2007	Close to Fantasy: Released: March 21, 2007; Label: EMI Music Japan (TOCT-26215); Formats: CD, digital download	25	33,000
2008	Love Forever: Released: July 2, 2008; Label: EMI Music Japan (TOCT-26579); Formats: CD, digital download	17	23,000
2010	BEST TRACKS: Released: October 27, 2010; Label: EMI Music Japan (TOCT-26965); Formats: CD, digital download		

=== Singles ===
Release	Title	Chart positions			Oricon sales	Album
Release	Title	Oricon Singles Charts	Billboard Japan Hot 100	RIAJ digital tracks	Oricon sales	Album
2006	"Possession/My All for You"	16	—	—	30,000	Close to Fantasy
2007	"Hop, Step, Jump!"	32	—	—	6,000	Close to Fantasy
2007	"Lullaby for You"	12	—	—	21,000	Love Forever
2008	"Kissing Me"	11	—	—	11,500	Love Forever
2008	"Unchanging Love (Kimi ga Ireba)"	12	—	—	21,500	Love Forever
2008	"Winter Love Story"	31	—	—	6,000	BEST TRACKS
2009	"Maybe Someday"	23	—	—	4,000	BEST TRACKS
2009	"Muteki na Ai"	34	—	—	3,000	BEST TRACKS
2010	"Without You"	88	32	52	1,000	BEST TRACKS
