= Possession/My All for You =

"Possession / My All For You"

Single by Jyongri

from the album Close to Fantasy
- Released: December 13, 2006
- Genre: J-pop
- Length: N/A
- Label: EMI Music Japan
- Songwriter: Jyongri
- Producer: Jyongri

Jyongri singles chronology
"Possession / My All For You" (2006)	"Hop, Step, Jump!" (2007)

"Possession / My All For You" Jyongri's first single and Double-A single to be released in Japan under EMI Music Japan on December 13, 2006. "Possession/My All For You" debut at #16 on Oricon Weekly Single Charts and sold 7,572 within the first week. This single chart for total of 6 week and currently sold a grand total of 23,049 copies.

== Summary ==
"Possession" was released in two languages (English and Japanese) and being used as the November–December ending themes for "Itadaki Muscle" and "Super Chample," as well as the "Ongaku Senshi MUSIC FIGHTER" ending theme for November. While "My All For You" is being used as "Gokujou no Getsuyoru's" ending theme.

== Track listing ==
1. Possession
2. My All For You
3. Possession (English Version)
4. Possession (Chris Paul Club Remix)
5. Re-Possessed (Possession-Chris Paul Dub Mix)
6. Possession -Instrumental-
7. My All For You -Instrumental-
8. Possession (Vocal Track)
9. My All For You (Vocal Track)

== Charts ==
=== Oricon sales chart (Japan) ===
Release	Chart	Peak position	Sales total
December 13, 2006	Oricon Daily Singles Chart	15	
December 13, 2006	Oricon Weekly Singles Chart	16	23,049
