= GamerDNA =

Video game social media company

GamerDNA Inc.
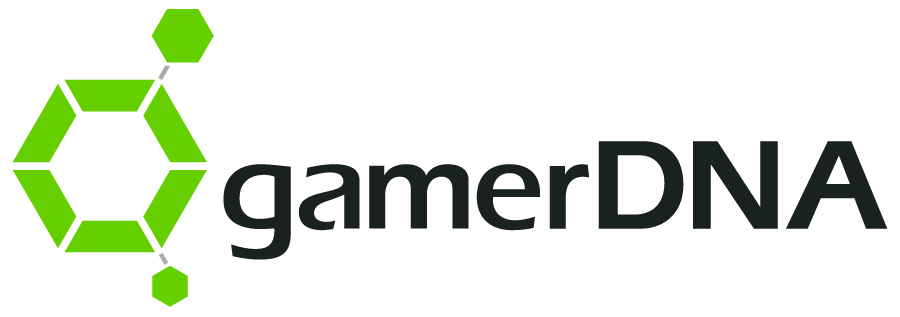
- Company type: Defunct
- Founded: September 21, 2006; 20 years ago
- Headquarters: New York City, United States
- Industry: Video game industry

gamerDNA Inc. was a social media company for video game players founded on September 21, 2006. The company was part of Live Gamer (Emergent Payments). Members may tag themselves with information on games they have played, server names and guild affiliations, and use this information to find people they have played with in the past, or find guilds or other gamers to play with based on play style. The company was originally funded by Flybridge Ventures (formerly known as IDG Ventures).

== Social network for online gamers ==
GamerDNA helped people discover new games to play based on their interests. The site features a number of tools to help game-players learn about what aspects of games they enjoy, including automated tracking of games on Xfire, Steam and Xbox Live; a database of games that locates games based on gameplay elements such as setting, tone and game mechanics; and quizzes such as the Bartle Test, which helps a player identify what aspects of game play they are most interested in—and then form connections with other players with similar interests.

The company has been compared to a Facebook and MySpace for online game players, Some industry analysts have observed that social networks for online games are part of a new trend in which major MMORPG products are spawning secondary industries. Also like other social networks, the service allowed members to form social connections with other members, and traverse the database of member profiles by these social connections or by user-defined tag clouds. However, the member profiles were geared toward the alter-egos that people play as within online games, and supports the storage of game histories, guild/clan memberships, scores and profiles, and screenshots of game accomplishments. These features allowed players to maintain social contact with each other as they grow beyond individual games, guilds or servers. The service also allowed members to form groups oriented around their gaming guilds and clans, including features for event scheduling, roster management and private communication.

== History ==
Jon Radoff founded the company in 2006.

Flybridge funded $600,000 of seed money. In April 2008, the company raised $3 million and changed its name from GuildCafe Entertainment Inc. to GamerDNA Inc.

In April 2008 GamerDNA acquired 360voice, a service that generates blogs using Xbox 360 gameplay data using a data feed offered by Microsoft.

GamerDNA was acquired by Crispy Gamer on 2009-12-16.

In July 2011, Crispy Gamer was acquired by Live Gamer.
