= The World Ends with You =

2007 action role-playing game

- North American Nintendo DS cover art. From left to right: Joshua, Neku, Beat (above), Shiki, and Rhyme.
- Developers: Square Enix; Jupiter (Note: Mobile and Nintendo Switch versions co-developed with h.a.n.d.)
- Publisher: Square Enix (Note: Nintendo published the Final Remix release for Nintendo Switch outside of Japan.)
- Directors: Tatsuya Kando; Tomohiro Hasegawa; Tetsuro Hosokawa
- Producers: Shinji Hashimoto; Tetsuya Nomura; Hatao Ogata
- Designers: Takeshi Arakawa; Hiroyuki Itou
- Artists: Tetsuya Nomura; Gen Kobayashi
- Writer: Sachie Hirano
- Composer: Takeharu Ishimoto
- Series: The World Ends with You
- Platforms: Nintendo DS; iOS; Android; Nintendo Switch
- Release: July 27, 2007: Nintendo DS; JP: July 27, 2007; EU: April 18, 2008; NA: April 22, 2008; AU: April 24, 2008 iOS; WW: August 27, 2012 Android; WW: June 26, 2014 Nintendo Switch; JP: September 27, 2018; WW: October 12, 2018
- Genre: Action role-playing
- Modes: Single-player, multiplayer (Final Remix)

The World Ends with You (Note: The game is known in Japan as It's a Wonderful World (すばらしきこのせかい, Subarashiki Kono Sekai).) is an action role-playing game co-developed by Square Enix and Jupiter for the Nintendo DS. Set in the modern-day Shibuya shopping district of Tokyo, The World Ends with You features a distinctive art style and urban fantasy elements inspired by Shibuya and its youth culture. Development was inspired by elements of Jupiter's previous handheld game, Kingdom Hearts: Chain of Memories. It was released in Japan in July 2007, and in PAL regions and North America in April 2008. Later, an enhanced port by h.a.n.d. for mobile devices was released in 2012 under the title The World Ends with You: Solo Remix, while another enhanced port for the Nintendo Switch was released worldwide in 2018 under the title The World Ends with You: Final Remix.

In the story, protagonist Neku Sakuraba and his allies are forced to participate in a game that will determine their fate. The battle system uses many of the unique features of the Nintendo DS, including combat that takes place on both screens, and attacks performed by certain motions on the touchscreen or by shouting into the microphone. Elements of Japanese youth culture, such as fashion, food, and cell phones, are key aspects of the missions and character progression.

The World Ends with You received critical acclaim upon release, with critics praising the graphics, soundtrack, and integration of gameplay into the Shibuya setting, with minor criticism directed at its learning curve and occasionally imprecise touch-screen controls. It is regarded as one of the best Nintendo DS games, and one of the greatest video games ever made. In the first week of its release, the game was the second best-selling DS title in Japan, and the top-selling DS title in North America. Shiro Amano, writer and artist of the Kingdom Hearts manga, later created a manga based on the video game. An anime adaptation by Square Enix, DOMERICA, and Shin-Ei Animation aired from April 10 to June 26, 2021.

The iPhone, iPad and Android versions were removed in July 2023.

A sequel, Neo: The World Ends with You, was released worldwide on Nintendo Switch and PlayStation 4 on July 27, 2021, and on Windows on September 28.

== Gameplay ==
The World Ends with You is an action role-playing game arranged into three chapters based on the three weeks that Neku is involved in the Reapers' Game, with each chapter further divided by each day of the week. The player controls Neku and his partner as they explore Shibuya to complete each day's mission. Although most missions require completion within a certain time for Neku and his partner, this timer is not correlated to the passage of time for the player.

Shibuya is divided into several districts, some of which may be inaccessible on certain days or blocked by a wall that can only be removed by satisfying the request of a nearby Reaper, such as erasing Noise symbols, wearing a certain brand of clothing, or bringing an item. Neku can scan the area by activating a special pin, which reveals the thoughts of the non-player characters in the Realground and memes, hints which may help to progress the plot. The scan also reveals random Noise symbols that drift about the area, or in some cases, float around a specific character. The player initiates a battle by touching Noise symbols; each symbol constitutes one round of battle. Selecting more than one Noise symbol at a time results in a multi-round battle, referred to in-game as multiple noise "reductions", that gradually increases in difficulty with each round and has greater rewards upon success. Altering the difficulty of the Noise and the amount of health for Neku and his partner also alter the benefits gained.

Each district has fashion trends that affect gameplay. By wearing pins or clothing from more popular brands in that district, items' effects will be improved; wearing the least fashionable items will do the opposite, and items from brands in between are not affected. However, the player can increase a brand's popularity in one district by repeatedly fighting battles in that district while wearing items of that brand. The player can enter shops to buy new pins, clothes, and food items that are consumed during battles to improve the characters' basic attributes.

After completing the game, the player can return to any day in the story and play events again with the characters' current statistics and inventory. "Secret Reports", written segments that reveal background elements of the story, can be unlocked through this mode by completing specific missions during each day. Completing the game allows the player to access "Another Day", an additional day of missions that explains certain events related to the main storyline. It has a minigame called "Tin Pin Slammer", also known as "Marble Slash", that can be played against computer opponents or with up to three others via a wireless connection. It is similar to the marble game ringer, as each player attempts to use their pins to knock the other players' pins off the game board.

The World Ends with You features "psych pins", decorative pins which possess powers that Neku can only activate while wearing them. Psych pins are used for combat, for "Tin Pin Slammer/Marble Slash", or as trade value for money or equipment. Most pins, particularly those used in combat, can become more powerful as the player accumulates "Pin Points" (PP) which can also lead to the evolution of the pins into more potent versions. Pin Points are mainly earned through battle, but can also be earned through a period of inactivity with the game, by interacting with other DS players, or randomly if none are found. Each of these methods influences the growth of pins.

=== Combat ===
Neku and Shiki fighting Noise in different "zones" near the same landmark. Neku's "psych pins" are displayed on the upper left of the bottom screen, and Shiki's card system is displayed along the top and bottom of the upper screen. Their shared health bar splits across both screens on the right side.

The game's combat system is called the "Stride Cross Battle System". The combat takes place across both screens of the DS, with Neku on the touchscreen and his partner on the top screen, representing the different "zones" of the same local area; the two characters battle the enemies that exist in both "zones" simultaneously. Neku and his partner are synchronized during battle and share the same health bar. Therefore, even if one character does not take any damage, the pair can fail in battle if the other takes too much. A green "light puck" will pass between the characters during battle; damage is increased by alternating battle between the character who possesses the puck. The movement of the light puck is determined by the "sync ratio" between Neku and his partner; the puck stays longer with the character with higher ratios. The player can equip Neku and his partner with clothing that can alter the light puck's speed. The light puck also can magnify Neku and his partner's attacks, and as long as they hold it, they are not attacked by an enemy and can continue it in a volley.

The player controls Neku by performing touchscreen actions based on the currently equipped pins. These actions include slashing across an enemy, tapping the screen rapidly to fire bullets, holding down on an enemy to inflict damage, or shouting into the microphone to cause a full-screen attack. Other pins must be touched to activate them, such as for health restoration. Each pin has a limited number of uses before it must recharge for a certain time. Other pins can be used a fixed number of times during a series of battles, and do not recharge until the battle is over. Neku can only be equipped with a maximum of two pins at the start of the game, but this can eventually be upgraded to a maximum of six.

Neku's partner on the top screen can be controlled by the player using the face buttons, although players can also have the computer assist them. Each of Neku's partners has a card game-based mechanic; for example, Shiki's card game requires the player to match face-down Zener cards. The partner can perform a basic attack after the player navigates through a pathway of arrows to select one of several shown cards using the directional pad or face buttons. By navigating to a card that fits within the card game rules, the player earns a star. Once enough stars are collected, the player can launch a powerful "Fusion" attack using both Neku and his partner through the "Harmonizer Pin" that appears on the upper right of the touchscreen, assuming that the player has not rearranged where it is displayed. The player can also help the partner character dodge attacks.

In the game's re-releases on single screen systems, such as mobile and Switch, the battle system is modified to reflect the lack of a second screen. The current partner instead acts as a separate pin among Neku's other pins, which the player can call in to perform attacks by similar touchscreen actions, like tapping on an enemy or slashing down on one. The player must balance the use of the partner pin with Neku's attacks, going to their partner repeatedly to build up towards the Fusion attack. The Fusion attack is launched by tapping the partner pin on the screen; the player then has a limited period of time to complete card-based minigames to build up a damage multiplier. For example, with Shiki as their partner, the player is shown one Zener card, along with several other Zener cards that are shown face-up for a moment before being turned over. The player must select those face-down cards that were matches for the shown Zener card. The Switch version offers a local cooperative mode, where a second player using a second Joy-Con has control over the partner character and a limited set of pin attacks during battle.

== Synopsis ==
=== Setting ===
The game takes place in a fictional version of the Shibuya shopping district in Tokyo, Japan. While everyday life goes on in the Realground (RG), the chosen dead are brought to an alternate plane of existence called the Underground (UG), which serves as the venue for the Reapers' Game. By offering their most treasured possession to enter the Game, the dead gain the chance to contest for the prize: to be brought back to life or transcend to a higher form of spiritual existence. Most of those who choose to transcend become Reapers, the opponents of players in future Games. Each Game lasts a week and is a contest to judge the worth of humanity. Players set out to accomplish objectives under the rules created by the Composer, a god-like entity that maintains Shibuya. The highest among the Reapers, the Conductor, tasks other Reapers to obstruct the players' efforts. Failure to complete a mission will disperse the mind and spirit of the player or Reaper, thus erasing their existence.

A player in the UG is invisible to the living in the RG, though one can sometimes read and influence their thoughts. The UG is frequented by creatures called "Noise", which are attracted by the negative feelings of the living. To progress in the Reapers' Game, players are often required to defeat Noise by killing or "erasing" them. However, each Noise exists in two parallel universes, or "zones", simultaneously, and can only be defeated by two players simultaneously fighting and defeating the Noise from these separate zones. To do so, players are required to form a pact with another player to survive the Noise. Players receive assignments via text messages sent to their cell phones, and their right hands are imprinted with a countdown indicating the time left in the mission. After a day's mission is complete, the remaining players find themselves at the start of the next day's mission, having no sense of the time that has passed in between.

=== Characters ===
The player controls Neku Sakuraba (桜庭 音操, Sakuraba Neku; ネク Neku), an initially asocial teenage boy who claims that he does not "get" people, and rarely interacts with others at first. Computer-controlled characters make up the rest of the cast, which includes players paired with Neku. In the first Game, Neku is paired with Shiki Misaki (美咲 四季, Misaki Shiki; シキ Shiki), a teenage girl who takes on the form of her best friend, as her physical appearance was her price of entry for the Game. In the second Game, Neku's partner is an intelligent and sly teenage boy, Yoshiya Kiryu (桐生 義弥, Kiryū Yoshiya), who prefers to be called Joshua (ヨシュア, Yoshua). Neku's final partner is Daisukenojo Bito (尾藤 大輔之丞, Bitō Daisukenojō), originally a player and ex-Reaper who calls himself "Beat" (ビイト, Biito). Beat became a Reaper to find a way to bring his younger sister, Raimu Bito (尾藤 来夢, Bitō Raimu) (nicknamed "Rhyme" (ライム, Raimu)), back to life, as she had sacrificed herself to save him from a Noise attack. Sanae Hanekoma (羽狛 早苗, Hanekoma Sanae; ハネコマ Hanekoma), the Producer, bound her soul to a pin from which her Noise could be summoned, and gave it to Beat. The final Game Master, Mitsuki Konishi (虚西 充妃, Konishi Mitsuki; コニシ Konishi), crushes her Noise form and transforms it back into a pin.

Besides the Composer and the Conductor, there are other high-ranking Reapers. For each week of the Game, Game Masters are assigned by the Conductor to lead the opposition to the players. Of the Game Masters opposing Neku, Sho Minamimoto (南師 猩, Minamimoto Shō; ミナミモト Minamimoto) is the most dangerous, as he willingly circumvents the rules in an attempt to supplant the Composer. While participating in the Games to earn promotions for their performance, the Reapers' goal is to ascend to the highest form of spiritual existence, the Angels. Angels supervise the Games and, if the stakes of a Game are particularly high, they send down one of their own to serve as the Producer. For the three weeks of the game's story, Sanae Hanekoma is the Producer. Disguised as a Shibuya café owner, he guides new players and narrates the "Secret Reports", which are obtained by completing additional missions after completing the game.

=== Plot ===
The game's story follows Neku over the three weeks that he plays the Game, paired with partners Shiki, Joshua, and Beat for each week, respectively. Neku is initially confused, as he does not know how he died or how he arrived at the UG. As he develops friendships with his partners, he starts to understand the rules of the Game. After the first week, only Shiki is allowed to return to the living, and she promises to meet Neku at the statue of Hachikō. He also recovers his entry fee, which was his memories, except for the events leading up to his death. However, Shiki has become what Neku values most, and she is used as his new entry fee for the second week; in addition, Beat defects to the Reapers in hopes of finding a way to resurrect Rhyme after she sacrifices herself to save him. During the second week, Neku recalls small details of his death; he eventually realizes that Sho Minamimoto, one of the Reapers he faced during the Game, shot him. At the end of the second week, Joshua seemingly sacrifices himself to save Neku from an explosion Minamimoto causes.

Because Joshua was never actually dead, the Game is nullified and Neku is forced to play the game a third time. His entry fee this time is all of the other players, meaning he cannot form any pacts and stands no chance against the Noise; however, Beat defects from the Reapers and rejoins Neku. Neku and Beat find that the Reapers and the population of Shibuya are wearing special red pins that brainwash them into thinking the same thoughts. Without any missions to complete, the two venture to the fabled "Shibuya River", which Joshua was looking for during the second week. At the river, they find Megumi Kitaniji (北虹 寵, Kitaniji Megumi; キタニジ Kitaniji), the Game's Conductor, who explains that he created the red pins in an attempt to remake Shibuya, which the Composer challenged him to do. If he fails, both he, and as a price for losing the Game, Shibuya, will be erased.

Joshua reappears and reveals himself to be the Composer, returning to Neku the missing part of his memory of his death: Joshua was the one who shot Neku and chose him to be his proxy in his challenge with Kitaniji. Minamimoto, who had been trying to usurp the position of Composer, attempted to kill Joshua in his weakened state as a human. After Kitaniji fails to defeat Neku by using his friends against him, Joshua gives Neku one last challenge: to shoot Joshua to determine the fate of Shibuya. Neku is too conflicted to make a choice, and Joshua shoots him down. Neku finds himself back at the scramble crossing, confused but alive.

The game's credits show scenes seven days later in the RG. As Neku walks from Udagawa to the statue of Hachikō to meet Beat, Rhyme, and Shiki, he discusses how the past three weeks have changed him for the better. In a statement addressed to an absent Joshua, Neku states that he trusts him despite not forgiving him for his actions. Neku then asks if Joshua will be present at Hachikō as well. Secret reports that can be obtained by completing additional missions after beating the game reveal that Joshua, after seeing Neku's personality change while playing the game, decides to spare Shibuya, now believing it to be ideal.

==== A New Day ====
The Final Remix version of the game adds new storyline content taking place after the main game. Neku and Beat awaken in a geographically distorted alternate version of Shibuya and are assigned a mission to escape it within 24 hours. Accompanied by a Reaper named Coco Atarashi, the two traverse through the alternate Shibuya while encountering Shiki and Rhyme. As they progress, Neku has visions of a city being destroyed and a strange girl with Shiki's stuffed animal, as well as what are seemingly distorted flashbacks of his death and Rhyme's sacrifice. When Rhyme sacrifices herself to save Beat as in Neku's vision, Neku realizes that he is having visions of the future. Neku and Beat arrive at Mr. Hanekoma's café, and he reveals that the Shibuya they have been traversing is a giant Noise Coco created. Neku and Beat defeat the Noise and return to reality. An enraged Coco shoots Neku dead, but Joshua fends her off. Joshua meets with Hanekoma to discuss recent events; they reveal that Shinjuku has been erased and that Noise are starting to appear in the RG, and that the strange girl from Neku's visions was a survivor of the incident who they theorize caused Neku's visions and was helping him. Elsewhere, Coco plots to continue using Neku for her plans and resurrects Minamimoto to serve as his partner.

== Development ==
=== Gameplay design ===
The World Ends with You was developed by the same team that created the Kingdom Hearts series, with input from Jupiter, the company that developed Kingdom Hearts: Chain of Memories for the Game Boy Advance. Development of the game started two and a half years before its Japanese release, during the development of Kingdom Hearts II and as development of Chain of Memories was concluding. At that time, Nintendo revealed their next handheld system, the Nintendo DS, but was not yet available to the market; Square Enix requested the team to develop a game specifically for the handheld system.

The creative team — consisting of director Tatsuya Kando, co-director Tomohiro Hasegawa, planning director Takeshi Arakawa, and creative producer and character designer Tetsuya Nomura — were able to experience the DS during the "Touch DS" event in November 2004. From this demonstration, they had envisioned a version of Chain of Memories in which the card game aspects would be present on the bottom screen and an action role-playing game on the top. As they continued to work on the game, the developers realized that they wanted to use the touchscreen more, to make "a game that can only be played on the DS". However, they also encountered the problem that by focusing heavily on the touchscreen, the top screen would be ignored. From this, the idea of the dual-screen battle system arose. Several other options were explored for the top screen gameplay, including command-based battles or a rhythm game, but once they reviewed the game from the eyes of the player, they ultimately settled on the card-game approach with the player having the option to control the game if they wanted to.

Even with the completion of the Japanese version of the game, the team felt the dual-screen system was too much for overseas audiences, and attempted to change the card-game mechanic into a special meter that would fill up with normal attacks from Neku, but this was not completed in time for release. The team was able to alter the "information overload" of the numerous tutorials at the start of the game in the North American release, reducing the amount of text presented as well as allowing the tutorials to be skipped. The "Active Encounter" system, the ability for the player to select when and how to go into battle, was developed specifically to avoid the issues of "grinding" that are common with most standard RPG systems. While they included the mechanics of being able to scan non-playable characters to see their thoughts, the team was not able to integrate this mechanic more into the game.

=== Graphics design ===
==== Character design ====
The team decided to stay with two-dimensional sprites instead of three-dimensional models for this title, believing it would help differentiate themselves from other Square Enix titles as well as better represent their vision for the game. When first approached with the task of creating the art for the game, background art director Takayuki Ohdachi thought the modern-day setting would be too boring, and opted to use highly skewed and angular images of Shibuya to avoid this; the rest of the creative team found this approach to fit the game quite well. For combat, the background of the top screen was selected for visual interest, while the bottom touchscreen background was designed to emphasize the gameplay. Ohdachi was also responsible for the artwork for the psych pins, and used a mix of pop art and tribal designs for the various graphics.

Character designs were handled by Tetsuya Nomura and Gen Kobayashi. Character designs were made to match with the real-world Tokyo setting, after which their outfits were designed based on the character's personality. Kobayashi was also in charge of designing the game's non-player characters and noted how most designs made it to the final product.

Hasegawa was responsible for creating the designs for the Noise creatures, and he wanted to have them recognizable as creatures before they decay into skeletons. In keeping with the theme of human emotion in the game, Hasegawa selected creatures that conveyed such feelings, such as wolves and crows. Representation of the Noise in the game required drawing the 2D sprites from several angles to match the action on screen as well as using rotoscoping on pre-rendered sprites, and took several iterations between Square Enix and Jupiter to make sure that the sprites' art matched the style of game, with Kando making the two-hour trip between Tokyo and Kyoto weekly to check on the progress.

==== Setting and scenario ====
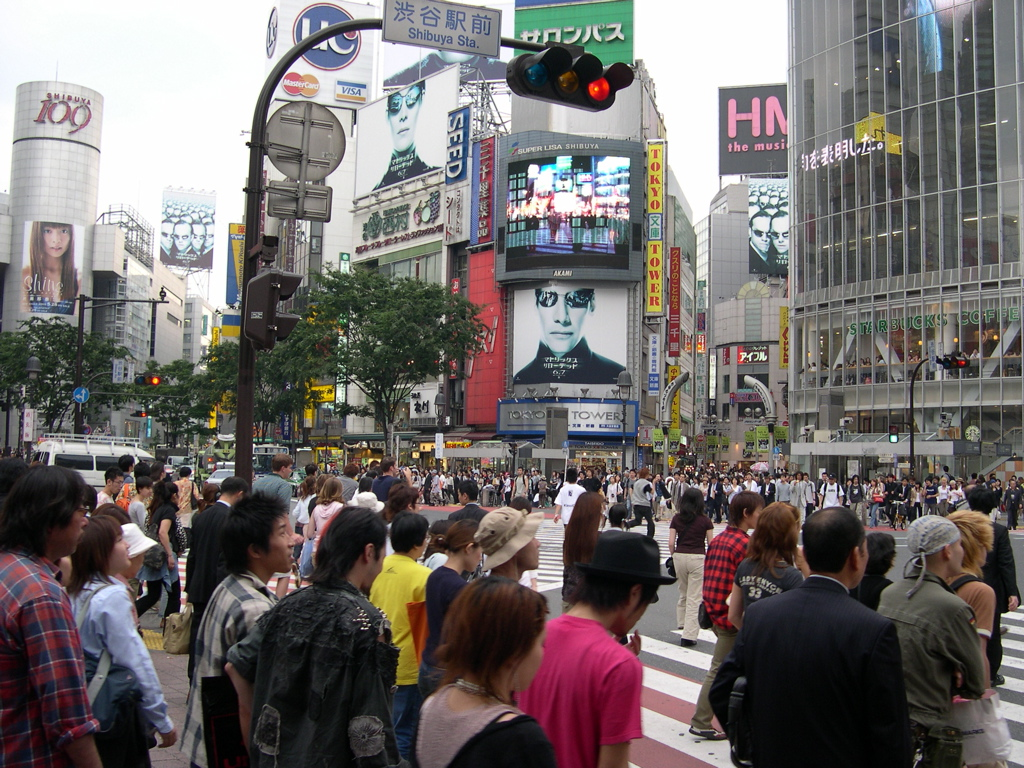
Many of the game's sets are modeled after the real Shibuya. The scramble crossing near the 109 department store (far left above) is extensively featured in the game and can be seen in the background of the game's cover.

In addition to creating unique gameplay, the designers wanted to build the game around a real location. Initially, they had planned to use a large number of locations across the entire world as the setting. They narrowed down the settings to specific cities due to practicality issues. Ultimately, Kando selected Shibuya as the main setting within the first year of development, despite concerns that overseas players would find the setting unfamiliar. The team wanted to make sure the city was represented accurately within the game, and went on "location hunts" onto building rooftops without permission to get photographs.

The layout of Shibuya was duplicated for the game, retaining the real-world landmarks while rebranding the names of stores and buildings for copyright reasons; for example, the 109 Building was renamed to be the "104 Building", while one of the busiest Starbucks, adjacent to the scramble crossing, was renamed "Outback Cafe". The success of the game has led to fans going on tours of the district to match physical locations in Shibuya with those in the game. The selection of Shibuya led to the incorporation of much of the game's other features, including food, clothing, and cell phone usage. The team initially thought of the idea of using graffiti around Shibuya as the source of the player's power in the game but had difficulty representing it; this led to the creation of the psych pins used in the game.

=== Writing ===
The developers knew that for the story they wanted to "throw the player right in the action, with things he had to do without explanation" in addition to creating a sense of urgency and mystery for the player. They developed an initial draft of the game's plot and gave it to scriptwriter Sachie Hirano and scenario event planner Yukari Ishida to expand on. The returned version was very close to the initial vision for the game's story. However, there were still difficulties in filling out the story, only achieving some smooth development about halfway through the process, and even then, there were still changes made just before creating the master image for the game. Several inconsistencies with the game's story were found in the final quality checks that had to be resolved. The Square Enix localization team preserved many Japanese elements while translating most of the dialogue and interface items into English and other European languages to avoid losing the culture of the game. The team was also limited by the size of the dialogue balloons used in the game and took several steps to avoid losing the meaning.

As The World Ends with You focuses on the character of Neku Sakuraba, to create a believable story the developers put a lot of focus on his development, such as how he would feel, what thoughts lie behind his actions, how he interacted with other characters, and how the people around him feel about him. The developers included aspects and daily concerns, hoping that they could be things that players would have to deal with their personal lives and therefore would let them relate with Neku.

=== Soundtrack ===
The soundtrack to The World Ends with You was composed and produced by Takeharu Ishimoto. The game's music encompasses many genres, combining rock, hip hop, and electronica and was designed to fit the various moods of Shibuya. The song appearing during the credits of the game is "Lullaby for You" by Japanese pop artist, Jyongri. Vocal artists featured in the game include Sawa Kato, Makiko Noda, Leah, Ayuko Tanaka, Mai Matsuda, Wakako, Hanaeryca, Cameron Strother, Andy Kinlay, Nulie Nurly, and Londell "Taz" Hicks. The developers used CRI Middleware's Kyuseishu Sound Streamer, a compression algorithm normally used for voice-overs, to compress the soundtrack and fit more songs on the game media, while replacing full motion video cutscenes with Flash-style animations to save more space. The ADX-compressed soundtrack and cutscene audio on the final version of the game take up approximately one-fourth (32 of 128 total MB) of the game media.

The official soundtrack of the game, The World Ends with You Original Soundtrack (すばらしきこのせかい ORIGINAL SOUNDTRACK, Subarashiki Kono Sekai Original Soundtrack; meaning "It's a Wonderful World Original Soundtrack") was released in Japan on August 22, 2007 and is on sale in most English-language iTunes Stores. This release does not include the four tracks unique to localizations outside Japan and is simply a digital version of the Japanese soundtrack. Square Enix, however, released the digital 6-track EP Subarashiki Konosekai + The World Ends with You (すばらしきこのせかい + The World Ends with You, Subarashiki Kono Sekai + The World Ends with You; meaning "It's a Wonderful World + The World Ends with You") on June 25, 2008 through the Japanese iTunes Store. This release contains the four songs unique to the international version of the game, along with the English version of "Owari-Hajimari" and a remix of "Twister". A 19-track version of the album was given a physical CD and iTunes release on July 30 the same year.

== Release ==
The Japanese title, translated as It's a Wonderful World, was not used internationally due to copyright issues. Instead, the game was released in North America and Europe under the name The World Ends with You. The game was officially announced in September 2006 by Square Enix, and premiered at the Tokyo Game Show two weeks later. The game was released for Europe, Australia, and a North America in April 2008.

A special "Wonderful World" edition of the "Gloss Silver" Nintendo DS Lite was created and sold as a bundle with the game as part of its Japanese release. The game's early plot was adapted into a two-chapter one-shot manga by Shiro Amano, published over two issues of Square Enix's Monthly Shōnen Gangan on August 11 and September 12, 2007. In North America, the manga has been released online via the Square Enix Members website, along with mobile phone ringtones. Both Nomura and Tatsuya Kando stated that they hoped they would be given the opportunity to create a sequel to the game.

Neku, Shiki, Joshua, Beat, and Rhyme appear in Kingdom Hearts 3D: Dream Drop Distance as non-playable characters challenged to a task similar to the Reapers' Game. They are the first non-Disney and non-Final Fantasy characters to appear in the Kingdom Hearts franchise. Three of the tracks, "Someday", "Calling", and "Twister", were rearranged for Dream Drop Distance, with "Calling" and "Twister" also remixed as downloadable tracks for Theatrhythm Final Fantasy: Curtain Call. A revised soundtrack, The World Ends With You - Crossover, was released on September 20, 2012, including original tracks from the DS game, the Dream Drop Distance versions of "Calling", "Someday", and "Twister", and the remixes from the iOS version. The Dream Drop Distance arrangement of "Calling" was also featured in the rhythm game Kingdom Hearts: Melody of Memory.

=== Solo Remix ===
A port for mobile devices, entitled The World Ends with You: Solo Remix, was released on iOS on August 27, 2012, and on Android on June 26, 2014. This version was developed by Square Enix's mobile development team and h.a.n.d. within the course of the year. The game's combat system was reworked to accommodate the lack of a second screen.

In addition to combat changes, Solo Remix includes redrawn high-definition sprites and is optimized for the Retina display of iOS devices. The original soundtrack and additional remixes of these songs are included alongside three additional songs performed by Stephanie Topalian. Wireless and social media features are also included: the Tin Pin Slammer can be played with other players via wireless connections, and the game can connect with the player's social media applications to display these as scanned thoughts from non-player characters within the game. The Solo Remix version features a remixed soundtrack from the original DS release. A new character, the Reaper Coco Atarashi, is introduced and is a shop owner dealing with microtransactions. New assets at the conclusion of the iOS game include the appearance of Tsugumi Matsunae, a character later appearing in the sequel, Neo: The World Ends with You. The iOS version of the game was delisted from the App Store in February 2015 due to an issue that prevented the game from working with the iOS 8 operating system launched in September 2014, though the Android version remained available. It returned to the App Store four months later in June.

=== Final Remix ===
I've had a chance to attend various events in different countries during the 11 years following the release of The World Ends with You. On many occasions, I have been interviewed by both the fans and the media, who have told me how much they want me to make a sequel for The World Ends with You. We've been looking for an opportunity, and there were a few times we tried to get it started, but time passed without it ever coming to realization. There are a number of implications behind this "Final Remix" version. In addition to my intention of making this my last time working with the original game, I think this is the final chance for creating a path to the next step, which I've had ideas about since the first launch 11 years ago. Many thanks to everyone for supporting ongoing efforts.

— Tetsuya Nomura discussing The World Ends with You: Final Remix

Another port for the Nintendo Switch, entitled The World Ends with You: Final Remix, was released on October 12, 2018. The port, based on the Solo Remix version and with additional development from Square Enix and h.a.n.d., includes a new control system adapted for the Switch, specifically allowing for the use of the Joy-Con in tabletop mode in addition to the touchscreen and mandatory co-op support for Neku's partner. An additional new scenario featuring Tsugumi and Coco Atarashi was added to this version.

=== Anime television series ===
An anime adaptation of the game, titled The World Ends with You the Animation, aired worldwide from April 10 to June 26, 2021 through Funimation, as well as the Super Animeism block on MBS and TBS. (Note: MBS and TBS listed the series premiere at 25:25 on April 9, 2021, which is effectively 1:25 a.m. JST on April 10.)

== Reception ==
Reception

Aggregate scores
Aggregator	Score		
Aggregator	DS	iOS	NS
Metacritic	88/100	91/100 iPad: 95/100	77/100
OpenCritic	N/A	N/A	56% recommend

Review scores
Publication	Score		
Publication	DS	iOS	NS
1Up.com	A−	N/A	N/A
4Players	N/A	N/A	9/10
Destructoid	N/A	N/A	6/10
Edge	8/10	N/A	N/A
Electronic Gaming Monthly	A−, A−, B	N/A	N/A
Eurogamer	8/10	N/A	N/A
Famitsu	35/40	N/A	33/40
Game Informer	8.25/10	N/A	7.5/10
GameRevolution	A−/A+	N/A	N/A
GameSpot	9.0/10	N/A	N/A
IGN	9/10	9.5/10	7.8/10
Nintendo Life	N/A	N/A	8/10
Nintendo Power	9/10	N/A	N/A
Nintendo World Report	7.5/10	N/A	6/10
Official Nintendo Magazine	8.8/10	N/A	N/A
Pocket Gamer	N/A	4.5/5	N/A
TouchArcade	N/A	5/5	N/A
X-Play	5/5	N/A	N/A

The World Ends with You received positive reviews and has been commercially successful. Game Informer named the game its Handheld Game of the Month award for May 2008. IGN gave The World Ends with You its Editors' Choice Award, and named it the DS Game of the Month for April. In Japan, the game premiered as the second-best selling DS title during the week of July 27, 2007. Nearly 193,000 units were sold in Japan by the end of 2007. The World Ends with You sold 43,000 copies during April 2008 in North America. The first shipment of the game sold out mid-May and a second shipment was made in mid-June 2008. The game was the top-selling DS title the week of its release and again two weeks later. As of September 2008, The World Ends With You has sold approximately 140,000 copies in North America and 20,000 copies in Europe.

Critics praised the departure from other popular titles such as Square Enix's Final Fantasy and Kingdom Hearts series. Both the graphical presentation and the soundtrack were very well received. Reviews also commented that initially, the character designs were too similar to previous Square Enix titles and may be off-putting to some, though in the Shibuya setting they were "absolutely in their element". Some reviewers also complained that the Stride Cross Battle System was too complex for new players; Eurogamer's review felt the "sink or swim" reliance on learning the complex battle system was a significant stumbling block for the game. GamePro noted that the stylus input was imprecise, often mistaking movement and attack actions. On the other hand, the system was praised for its approach, and for the ability to alter the difficulty of the system within the game. Neku Sakuraba's character arc was praised by several reviewers, such as G4TV editor Jonathan Hunt, who praised his growth from a "mute teenager" to a "civil human". 1UP.com's review summarized that the game is much more than the sum of its parts: "By all rights, The World Ends With You should be an annoying disaster, a bundle of tired gimmicks and trite clichés. Yet somehow all the things that should be unbearable fall into place and create a game that's far more unique, interesting, and addictive than it has any right to be".

IGN gave The World Ends with You multiple awards, including best Nintendo DS role-playing game, best story for a Nintendo DS game, best new IP for the Nintendo DS, and the best DS game of the year. It was also nominated for other awards, including best original score for a Nintendo DS game and best artistic design for a Nintendo DS game. It was ranked as the tenth best game of the 2000s released on a Nintendo system by Nintendo Power.

The World Ends with You: Solo Remix received a score of 9.5 and an Editor's Choice from IGN, who praised the port and its additions, although criticized its price point and lack of universal compatibility (the iPhone/iPod Touch and iPad versions of the game must be purchased separately). Kotaku also criticized the high price and lack of universal compatibility as 'indefensible', though it praised the port for its controls, saying "in many ways, it feels more suited to (the iPad) than it ever did on the DS".

The World Ends With You was nominated for Best RPG at 2008 Spike Video Game Awards, but lost to Fallout 3.

== Sequel ==
A sequel, Neo: The World Ends with You, was released worldwide on July 27, 2021 for Nintendo Switch and PlayStation 4, with the PC version released on September 28. It features a new cast of characters playing the Reapers' Game in Shibuya, and uses three-dimensional graphics. Tatsuya Kando returned as series director, while Tetsuya Nomura returned as creative producer, along with Gen Kobayashi as character designer, and Hiroyuki Itou as director. Takeharu Ishimoto, the composer for the original game, though no longer a full-time employee of Square Enix, also returned as composer for the sequel.
