= Crispy Gamer =

American video game website

- Screenshot of Crispy Gamer from January 2011
- Website type: Gaming website
- Available in: English
- Owner: Live Gamer
- Creators: Chris Heldman, John Keefer, Chris Hoerenz, Andre Srinivasan, Aldis Porietis
- Registration: Optional
- Launched: October 26, 2008
- Current status: Defunct

Crispy Gamer was an American video game website that published news, culture, reviews, comics, and videos. It launched on October 26, 2008, as an independent website after being in beta for six months. Founding staff included former employees of Google, eMusic, and gaming website GameSpy. In January 2010, one month after acquiring gamerDNA, the editorial staff was laid off by the authority of the board of directors, with the company's CEO resigning in protest. The website continued to operate, with gamerDNA being acquired by Live Gamer in 2011. It was stated in 2012 that the website became defunct.

== History ==
Crispy Gamer was created by Chris Heldman, head of media entertainment at Google; John Keefer, editorial director of GameSpy; Chris Hoerenz, chief marketing officer from eMusic; E2open engineer Andre Srinivasan; and Aldis Porietis. The website was first conceived by Chris Heldman under the idea of "The Game Trust", a chosen group of some of the finest writers in the industry. He pitched the idea of creating a new gaming website to John Keefer at the E3 2007. Keefer, initially adamant, agreed with the stipulation of a "separation of church and state" in terms of being in the pocket of video game companies.

The company was based in New York City, setting up office in October 2007. The site was in beta for six months before launching on October 26, 2008, with twenty employees, ranging from Entertainment Weekly to Wired. The website announced the same day that it raised $8.25 million in venture capital from J. P. Morgan's Constellation Ventures. In February 2009, Crispy Gamer signed a syndication deal with Tribune Media Services, McClatchy Tribune Information Services, and gamerDNA.

The website decided against showing video game advertising. Despite reaching a million in monthly unique visitors, it failed to generate ad revenue. Heldman blamed it on the Great Recession, which he described as "a perfect storm". In September 2009, John Keefer left the website to write for GamePolitics.com. In December 2009, the company acquired gamerDNA, Inc. One month after the acquisition, the editorial staff and most of the management on authority of the board of directors were laid off. The editorial staff included former Joystiq writer Kyle Orland, Scott Jones, former associate producer of The Daily Show John Teti, Evan Narcisse, James Fudge, Ryan Kuo, managing editor Elise Vogel, and Chief Marketing Officer Anne Mischler. In response to the layoffs, Chris Heldman resigned as CEO in protest.

Original gamerDNA CEO Jon Radoff mentioned he only learned of this through inquiring journalists. The day before, in a meeting between Crispy Gamer's videographer John Teti and member of the board and representative of Constellation Ventures Tom Wasserman, Wasserman mentioned his displeasure of the site's underwhelming traffic and ad revenue. The board of directors decided to take the website to a "gaming focused ad network" direction as a result. In July 2011, gamerDNA was acquired by Live Gamer. At that time, the company was still operating Crispy Gamer. Kyle Orland stated in January 2012 that the website was defunct.
