= Shiki Misaki =

- Shiki Misaki in The World Ends with You
- First game: The World Ends with You (2008)
- Created by: Tatsuya Kando
- Designed by: Tetsuya Nomura

Shiki Misaki (Japanese: 美咲 四季, Hepburn: Misaki Shiki; シキ Shiki) is a fictional character in the Nintendo DS video game The World Ends with You by Square Enix. She is a teenage girl who takes on the form of her best friend, as her physical appearance was her price of entry for the Reapers' Game following her death. During the game, the relationship between her and protagonist Neku Sakuraba allows Shiki to overcome her insecurities regarding Eri and accept her true persona. The character has also appeared in the game's animated adaptation, the sequel Neo: The World Ends with You, and the video game Kingdom Hearts 3D: Dream Drop Distance.

Tatsuya Kando created Shiki as a catalyst needed in order to develop Neku across the game. She was designed by Tetsuya Nomura, who gave her a teddy bear as a weapon after scrapping darts, which he believed would be dangerous if the audience would try to imitate her. Shiki's true persona, who makes a cameo appearance in the sequel, was designed by Miki Yamashita.

Critical response to Shiki's character has been positive for her serious personality and jealousy over her more popular friend, which fits her fashionable outfit. Her relationship with Neku was also praised, as they manage to develop together despite him initially coming across as unlikable.

== Appearances ==
In The World Ends With You, Shiki Misaki is a young girl who enters the Reapers' Game in an alternate Shibuya, Tokyo following her death. Her entry fee was her physical appearance and identity. As a result, she spends the first week looking exactly like her best friend, Eri—someone who she deeply envied for being more conventionally attractive. The player character Neku Sakuraba becomes Shiki's teammate in the Reapers' Game, but they struggle due to Neku's antisocial persona. As they develop a growing friendship, Shiki's arc forces her to confront these insecurities and learn to value herself for who she truly is. In the first week of the game, Shiki is erased from the game and Neku takes it upon himself to save her. It is later revealed that Reaper Megumi Kitanji took her soul and sealed her inside a Player Pin, but she is revealed to have been revived in the game's ending. Shiki reprises her role from The World Ends with You in the animated adaptation.

The Final Remix version of the game adds a new storyline where Shiki is in an alternate Shibuya. Neku has visions of a city being destroyed and a strange girl with Shiki's stuffed animal, as well as what are seemingly distorted flashbacks of his death and Rhyme's sacrifice. Neku realizes that he is having visions of the future, and he and Beat defeat the Noise and return to reality. An enraged Coco shoots Neku dead, but Joshua fends her off. Joshua meets with Hanekoma to discuss recent events; they reveal that Shinjuku has been erased and that Noise are starting to appear in the RG, and that the strange girl from Neku's visions was a survivor of the incident who they theorize caused Neku's visions and was helping him. Elsewhere, Coco plots to continue using Neku for her plans and resurrects Minamimoto to serve as his partner.

Neo: The World Ends with You reveals that Shiki and Neku are still friends, with Shiki revealing her true persona to him. She, alongside her friend Eri, open a highly successful Shibuya fashion label called Gatto Nero (ブラックキャット, Burakku Kyatto).

Outside the game, Shiki and other The World Ends with You characters appear in the world of Traverse Town as supporting characters in the video game Kingdom Hearts 3D: Dream Drop Distance. Shiki's group meets Kingdom Hearts character Riku whereas Neku meets the protagonist Sora.

== Concept and creation ==
Shiki's true appearance was designed by Miki Yamashita.

The World Ends with You director Tatsuya Kando said that Shiki's personality was written as a catalyst to develop Neku Sakuraba's arc in the game. Since the game was originally seen as a game with team battles, Neku and Shiki were written as leaders for opposing teams. Neku was originally going to be Shiki's underling. Tetsuya Nomura was in charge of designing her. In early versions tested by developers, Shiki used darts as weapons on the top screen, but Nomura decided against the idea since it would be dangerous for the young audience to imitate. Since he had writer's block when drawing her key visual, he decided to give her a plushie as her main weapon.

Shiki's true persona is shown in the sequel game, where Miki Yamashita was in charge of designing her outfit. Shiki was designed to look "fashionable in her own right, though not yet sophisticated". He gave her a green cardigan and leggings, attempting to make her look more modern but without major changes from the first game.

Since the game Kingdom Hearts 3D: Dream Drop Distance was created by the same development team, which contained members who worked on The World Ends with You, the Square Enix group decided to use Neku and other characters from said game in place of Final Fantasy characters.

== Reception ==
Critical response to Shiki's character was generally positive. ABC praised how she was handled in the game, since the player's fate depends on both her and the protagonist being treated carefully in order to beat the game. They also found Shiki's teddy bear to be a ridiculous weapon and criticized how clothing is used to make Shiki "nag less". Grace Benfell from AV Club praised the cast in general for their respective moving character arcs, with Shiki's coming across as a case of "jealosy and friendship abound with queer resonances". They also praised the screen time devoted to Shiki's interactions with Neku, who is seen as unlikable yet is able to develop thanks to her. In "Games for Girls? How About Games for Everyone?", Rebecca Pahle from The Mary Sue criticized that multiple female characters are sexualized in gaming, but said that the case of Shiki's skimpy design fits more with Japanese street fashion and her attempts to become more confident during the narrative. Casey Fot from TheGamer said that, while gamers remember Shiki for her fake fashionable outfit, after fourteen years they managed to see her true persona, who wears appealing clothes and is one of the most fashionable characters in the duology. Rebecca Phillips from the same site praised her caring personality and said that her arc and friendship with Joshua might lead to potential to support LGBTQ people.

Shiki's relationship with Neku was praised by Nintendo Power due to their contrasting personalities, which allow them to depend on each other across the game, giving them potential to start a romance during the ending. In retrospect, Anime Feminist considered Shiki's sacrifice in the original video game as a shocking moment from his childhood, with the anime adaptation serving as a major reminder of the event. She criticized how Shiki is sacrificed so that Neku can participate in the game again, something which he felt came across as sexist, especially with how it is only done for Neku's sake. When it came to the adaptation of the video game, Cartoon Cipher from Anime News Network said that the interactions Shiki has with Neku help to highly develop him and appreciated their friendship more. On a more negative side, Anime Feminist said that the handling of Shiki was harsh as, in the first episode, Neku was violent towards her and she quickly gets over it, making their partnership feel poor. Nevertheless, she found potential in the multiple relationships the anime was able to show in the first episode.

In "Toward a Gameic World: New Rules of Engagement from Japanese Video Games", B. Whaley says that the video game The World Ends with You has a heavy focus on shut-in people, better known as hikikomori in Japan, with the cast able to be labelled as such. Neku's personality embodies such a persona, especially when interacting with Shiki, who is often upset about his remarks and calls him inhuman in response. Across the game, Shiki's personal story delves into her struggles to fit in at school, especially when it is revealed that she took the appearance of her friend Eri, who she harbors jealousy and hatred towards. The reason for her death has implications of suicide, but is only ever stated as an "accident" in the game. Shiki's relationship with Neku often associates friendship with Shiki seeking to be seen for her true persona.
