= Neo: The World Ends with You =

2021 action role-playing game

- Cover art for all platforms featuring The Wicked Twisters, the game's main cast
- Developers: h.a.n.d.; Square Enix Creative Business Unit I
- Publisher: Square Enix
- Directors: Hiroyuki Itou; Tatsuya Kando
- Producers: Tomohiko Hirano; Tetsuya Nomura
- Programmer: Manabu Mizoguchi
- Artists: Tetsuya Nomura; Gen Kobayashi; Miki Yamashita
- Writer: Akiko Ishibashi
- Composer: Takeharu Ishimoto
- Series: The World Ends with You
- Engine: Unity
- Platforms: Nintendo Switch; PlayStation 4; Windows
- Release: Nintendo Switch, PS4; July 27, 2021; Windows; September 28, 2021
- Genre: Action role-playing
- Mode: Single-player

Neo: The World Ends with You (stylized as NEO: The World Ends with You) (Note: Known in Japan as New It's a Wonderful World (新すばらしきこのせかい, Shin Subarashiki Kono Sekai)) is a 2021 action role-playing game co-developed by Square Enix and h.a.n.d. and published by Square Enix. It is a sequel to the 2007 video game The World Ends with You. It was released for the Nintendo Switch and PlayStation 4 in July 2021 and for Windows in September. The story features a new cast of characters playing the Reapers' Game in Shibuya and, unlike the original game, features three-dimensional graphics.

Concepts for a sequel to The World Ends with You were conceived in the years following its original 2007 release, but did not come to fruition. Returning staff for the game include Tatsuya Kando as series director, Tetsuya Nomura as creative producer and character designer, Gen Kobayashi as character designer, and Hiroyuki Itou, who was game designer in the original but now serves as director. Takeharu Ishimoto, the composer for the original game, though no longer a full time employee of Square Enix, returned to compose music.

Neo: The World Ends with You received positive reviews from critics, but failed to meet sales expectations of the publisher.

== Gameplay ==
Unlike the original, Neo is a fully 3D title. Players can control multiple characters at once during combat and attack opponents with "psych" abilities granted by items called "pins". Each character can equip one of over 300 pins, and different groups of pins can be used to create combination attacks. Each pin is assigned to a single button and requires a different input to use. Wearable "threads" also boost the player characters' abilities. Common enemies are "Noise", negative emotions come to life. The scanning ability the player uses to search for these enemies also allows them to read characters' thoughts.

Leveling up increases the player characters' maximum health; other stats can be upgraded by ordering meals at restaurants in-game, though player characters can only eat when they are hungry, depicted by a meter that depletes after each fight. As the player interacts with people throughout the story, their "Social Network" expands, allowing them to spend acquired Friendship Points on upgrades such as exclusive shop and food items, expanded pin capacity, and assigning multiple pins to the same button in combat.

Outside of combat, characters can use their abilities to assist people and explore the city - for example, Fret's "Remind" ability will remind all NPCs in an area about a particular topic, and Shoka's "Telewarp" lets the group teleport to previously inaccessible areas. More of these abilities are acquired by progressing through the story. Previous days can be revisited at any time to access previously incomplete side missions.

== Synopsis ==
=== Setting ===
The game takes place in a recreated and stylized version of the Shibuya district in Tokyo, Japan. Unlike the first game's depiction of Shibuya, places such as Tower Records and Parco keep their names instead of using different ones, such as Towa Records and Molco. As with the anime adaptation, some elements of the original game are modernized for the sequel, such as the use of smartphones rather than flip-style cell phones, an updated look for Miyashita Park after its renovation in 2020, and the appearance of the 104 building matching the current appearance of the Shibuya 109.

=== Characters ===
The main protagonist and playable character is Rindo Kanade (奏 竜胆, Kanade Rindō), a high school student and a Player in the Reapers' Game. In the Game, he is partnered with his friend and classmate Tosai Furesawa (觸澤 桃斎, Furesawa Tōsai), nicknamed Fret (フレット, Furetto), and gaming otaku college student Nagi Usui (笛吹 梛, Usui Nagi). They make up a team of Players called the Wicked Twisters, with Rindo as its de facto leader. Each character has a unique ability in the Reapers' Game that is used during gameplay: Rindo can change the past with "Replay", Fret can remind people of things they have forgotten with "Remind", and Nagi can go into people's minds with "Dive". The team is also joined by returning former Reaper/antagonist from the first game, Sho Minamimoto (南師 猩, Minamimoto Shō).

Rindo and his friends compete against rival teams, including the Ruinbringers, the top team in the Reapers' Game, which includes Kaichi Susuki (周々木 鹿ー, Susuki Kaichi), nicknamed Susukichi (ススキチ) and Tsugumi Matsunae (松苗 亜実, Matsunae Tsugumi), the latter of whom returns from the first game's Solo Remix and Final Remix re-releases, the Deep Rivers Society, a group of river enthusiasts led by Fuya Kawahara (河原 封也, Kawahara Fuuya), the Variabeauties, a group of super stylists led by Kanon Tachibana (立花 果遠, Tachibana Kanon), and the Purehearts, a group of savvy social media influencers led by Motoi Anazawa (モトイ, Anazawa Motoi).

Reapers are split into two groups: the Shibuya Reapers, who first appeared in the original game, and the Shinjuku Reapers, who are new. The Shinjuku Reapers include Shiba Miyakaze (三谷風 椎葉, Miyakaze Shiiba), the Game Master in the Reapers' Game, Tanzo Kubo (久網 旦蔵, Kubō Tanzō), Ayano Kamachi (蒲池 菖乃, Kamachi Ayano), Kaie Ono (小野 解依, Ono Kaie), Hishima Sazakuchi (坂筑 菱真, Sazakuchi Hishima) and Shoka Sakurane (桜音 紫陽花, Sakurane Shōka), who later joins the Wicked Twisters as their fifth member. Shibuya Reapers returning from the first game are antagonists Koki Kariya (狩谷 拘輝, Kariya Kōki), Uzuki Yashiro (八代 卯月, Yashiro Uzuki), and Coco Atarashi (新 子々, Atarashi Koko), who returns from the first game's Solo Remix followed by LIVE Remix and Final Remix.

Rindo is also supported by Swallow (スワロウさん, Suwarou-san), his online friend who he communicates with through a social media game and text messages. Swallow's identity is an ongoing mystery Rindo attempts to uncover throughout the game, which is only revealed after the story's climax. Several protagonists from the first game also appear to support the new cast.

=== Plot ===
While trying to meet up with an online friend under the pseudonym Swallow, high schoolers Rindo Kanade and Tosai "Fret" Furesawa are unexpectedly drawn into the "Reapers' Game", a competition for the recently deceased in which they must battle other teams over the course of a week for their survival. The two form a team called the "Wicked Twisters" and recruit former Reaper Sho Minamimoto and college student Nagi Usui to survive. With Game Master Shiba Miyakaze and several of his subordinates, including Tanzo Kubo and Shoka Sakurane, overseeing them, the group battles the other teams and the Ruinbringers, a powerful team consisting of Kaichi "Susukichi" Susuki and Tsugumi Matsunae, who have won the preceding games and keep choosing to re-enter the next round, trapping the other teams in a never-ending series of game loops. During this time, Rindo discovers that he has the ability to rewind time. At the end of the week, the Wicked Twisters battle Susukichi, but are nearly defeated. However, a masked man who is presumed to be legendary former Player Neku Sakuraba, the protagonist of the first game, rescues them. Shiba declares the Ruinbringers victorious and erases the last place team, the Reaper's Game is extended for another week, and Minamimoto deserts the group.

During the second week, the Wicked Twisters recruit "Neku", who is revealed to be former Player Daisukenojo "Beat" Bito. They learn that Shiba and his Reapers hail from Shinjuku, which was erased in an event known as Inversion; they plan to do the same to Shibuya. They also learn that Shiba has been using Player Pins to pull living Players into the Reaper's Game, including Rindo, Fret, Nagi and Beat. Near the end of the week, Shoka defects to the Wicked Twisters after the Reapers learn she was secretly helping them, and Shiba reveals that he is the leader of the Ruinbringers and that Susukichi and Tsugumi are Reapers. He declares victory in the second week and challenges the Wicked Twisters to face him in one last game with Shibuya at stake.

During the third week, the Wicked Twisters battle Shiba's Plague Noise, which can erode the barrier between reality and the afterlife. Due to their aggressive mind-consuming behavior spreading in both planes, victims have their psyche warped in different ways, ranging from total apathy dubbed "Shibuya Syndrome" among the living, to more severe cases of aggression and amnesia among Players. Minamimoto returns and challenges the group to a fight, but the real Neku rescues them and explains that Reaper Coco Atarashi orchestrated his second death (Note: As depicted in The World Ends With You: Final Remix (2018)) in a futile attempt to save Shinjuku from erasure, and that they have since been investigating the incident in hopes of protecting Shibuya. Coco reveals that Tsugumi is the sole survivor of Shinjuku's erasure and that her soul has been sealed in a stuffed Mr. Mew, revealed to be the original Mr. Mew that Shiki made; the group uses their powers to talk with her and learn that she has been sending visions of the future to Neku and Rindo in an attempt to avert Shibuya's erasure.

The Wicked Twisters battle and erase Shiba, but Kubo confronts them and reveals that he has been masquerading as one of Shiba's Reaper subordinates, but is in fact an Angel who gave Shiba his powers over Plague Noise and is the true mastermind behind the erasure of Shinjuku. He also gave Rindo his time-traveling powers via his Player Pin, which absorbs the lost thoughts of the timelines he leaves behind to fuel a swarm of Noise that Kubo releases to destroy Shibuya. The Wicked Twisters battle Kubo, but all except for Rindo are erased. Before being erased, Shoka reveals to Rindo that she's Swallow. Kubo gloats his victory over Rindo until Shinjuku's Composer, Hazuki "Haz" Mikagi, permanently exorcises Kubo from reality.

Shibuya is saved and Rindo finds himself back in the real world, but all of his teammates have been erased from reality. Haz offers Rindo the chance to go back in time once more to save his friends, although doing so will once again put the city at risk of being destroyed by Kubo's Noise even if Kubo himself no longer exists. After deliberation, Rindo decides to turn back time to save both his friends and Shibuya. Rindo rallies the survivors and, with help from his friends, overwrites the lost thoughts with the thoughts of present-day Shibuya, which weakens Kubo's Noise swarm. The remaining Noise coalesce into a powerful Noise called Phoenix Cantus, which the Wicked Twisters destroy. In the aftermath, Rindo and his friends return to reality along with Shoka, who Yoshiya "Joshua" Kiryu, Shibuya's Composer, resurrects; the repentant Shiba returns to Shinjuku along with the remaining Shinjuku Reapers to rebuild the city.

=== "Another Day" ===
After completing the main story, players can complete a series of quests that are separate from the main plot events, similar to the "Tin Pin" storyline in the first game. The story is based around the protagonists getting tickets to a concert by "The Death March", a band that performed some of the songs in the game. All playable characters from the main story are available to use, including Minamimoto. There are many variations of the boss battles from the main story including a Minamimoto challenge boss. After completing the storyline, players can listen to a live rendition of the song "Rockin' Rockin'" while viewing the credits.

== Development and release ==
I've had a chance to attend various events in different countries during the 11 years following the release of The World Ends with You. On many occasions, I have been interviewed by both the fans and the media, who have told me how much they want me to make a sequel for The World Ends with You. We've been looking for an opportunity, and there were a few times we tried to get it started, but time passed without it ever coming to realization. There are a number of implications behind this "Final Remix" version. In addition to my intention of making this my last time working with the original game, I think this is the final chance for creating a path to the next step, which I've had ideas about since the first launch 11 years ago. Many thanks to everyone for supporting ongoing efforts.

— Tetsuya Nomura, Creative Producer and Main Character Designer, discussing The World Ends with You: Final Remix

The original The World Ends with You (TWEWY) had been developed by common team members and released around the same time as the Kingdom Hearts series. While the latter had more sales and recognition, the former had garnered a strong cult following as well as being a project of interest by creative producer and character designer Tetsuya Nomura and director Tatsuya Kando. However, much of the original's team were too involved in subsequent Kingdom Hearts games to focus on a follow-up according to Kando. TWEWY remained of significant interest within Square Enix, which led to them collaborating with h.a.n.d. on a high-definition port for mobile devices via Solo Remix in 2012, and another port for the Nintendo Switch via Final Remix in 2018, the latter of which included a new chapter called "A New Day" with new characters. Final Remix was directed by Hiroyuki Itou and produced by Tomohiko Hirano, both of whom reprise their roles for Neo. According to Hirano, while the idea for a sequel had been on their minds for some time, "we needed to secure an environment where we could focus on this game, so that's why it took a little bit of time for us to deliver it to you".

Kando said that while Neo is a sequel, they did not want to call it The World Ends with You 2, as there were many significantly new ideas in both gameplay and narrative, and were introducing new characters. Tetsuya Nomura commented that he had a lot of trouble with the title. He decided it just before the announcement. After much thinking, he decided to go with a nostalgic "新" (Shin; lit. New) title (Note: Japanese series tend to use Shin/New in their titles, especially sequels). However, Kando did state they wanted to address the loose ends from the original game, as well as from the "A New Day" scenario in Final Remix, but present it from the viewpoint of characters completely new to the Reapers' Game. Part of this includes the major shift from the dual-screen battle system used in the Nintendo DS game to a single-screen system. According to Itou, they wanted to make sure to retain the focus of teamwork of the DS battle system, and developed the new 3D-based battle system so that the player has control of all four members of the party at the same time, a concept that was explored during the development of Solo Remix.

Nomura returned to design the character art. For the lead character of Rindo, he was looking to provide some type of iconic item of clothing that would make him stand out and represent his isolated personality, similar to Neku's headphones in the original game. Prior to the COVID-19 pandemic, he had seen that face masks had become a popular fashion accessory for the youth of Japan and opted for that; he did not imagine that face masks would become a normal occurrence in the world by the time the game launched.

The game's world is based on an accurate representation of modern-day Shibuya, expanding maps into other areas of the district such as Harajuku. The game reflects the changes in Shibuya in the 14 years since the original game, such as renovations to Miyashita Park that were completed in 2020.

The game was revealed in November 2020, after a week-long countdown on the game's official web page. The reveal coincided with the upload of the anime adaptation's second trailer. Nomura uploaded an illustration featuring series protagonists Neku and Rindo to the game's official Twitter account in celebration. Neo was released for Nintendo Switch and PlayStation 4 on July 27, 2021, with a Windows version released on the Epic Games Store on September 28, followed by Steam on October 19, 2022, and GOG.com on October 8, 2026.

== Reception ==
Reception

Aggregate scores
Aggregator	Score
Metacritic	NS: 82/100; PS4: 80/100; PC: 85/100
OpenCritic	85% recommend

Review scores
Publication	Score
Destructoid	8/10
Electronic Gaming Monthly	5/5
Eurogamer	Recommended
Game Informer	8/10
GameSpot	7/10
IGN	7/10
Nintendo Life	9/10
Nintendo World Report	8.5/10
Push Square	7/10
RPGamer	4/5
RPGFan	69/100
Shacknews	8/10

Neo: The World Ends with You received "generally favorable" reviews from critics, according to review aggregator website Metacritic.

Eurogamer praised the characterization and design of the characters, finding them suitable for a The World Ends with You sequel as they also interact multiple times while participating in the Reaper's Game. Despite finding the combat system initially simplistic, the more development the player has, Neo allows the player to further experiment with multiple type of powers to fight enemies.

GameSpot praised the story but had mixed feelings about appeal of the certain cast members and criticized the constant exposition the narrative gives. Nevertheless, he praised the handling of the gameplay.

Nintendo Life found the game would appeal to both returning players as well as newcomers with the former finding satisfaction in the successor of the original video game and its lead Neku. He praised the initial cast as well as the English localization enough to avoid the Japanese option which multiple gamers tend to prefer. The handling of the combat and grinding through feeding the characters due to the freedom the player is given when it comes to finding Noises, or practise their preferred pins. Nevertheless, he criticized how some fights can be too long.

RPGamer enjoyed how each of the main characters have their own unique skills outside combat which gives their own roles in completing the Reaper's Game.

IGN found the handling of the character parties more important than in the original where Neku only had one ally in contrast to how Rindo's group increases and they all can have meals together besides having fights. However, IGN heavily criticized the boss fight designs for doing simplistic strategies of attacking and dodging enemies that can frustrate the player considering certain bosses' damage input can be too high.

Polygon's review praised the gameplay's systems always working together but not being too much for a player. They also claimed that the characters can be stereotypical, yet endearing as their interactions with each other grow complex. The art style and voice acting also impressed Polygon. Overall, they describe the game as enjoyable, but quite tied to its predecessor game, believing the original game to be necessary to play beforehand to fully appreciate the game's writing.

=== Sales ===
In Japan, Neo: The World Ends with You sold 18,799 physical units during its first week of release, making it the best-selling retail game.

In November 2021, Square Enix said that the game failed to meet their sales expectations. The chief accountant of the company, confirmed that sales that year were subsequently lower than the year prior. This is mostly attributed to the wide success of Final Fantasy VII Remake, another game worked on by Tetsuya Nomura which came out in 2020, and Marvel's Avengers which came out the same year.
