= Final Fantasy XV downloadable content =

Series of additional content expanding the 2016 Square Enix video game Final Fantasy XV

Promotional art for several major downloadable content packs of Final Fantasy XV.

Downloadable content for Final Fantasy XV, an action role-playing game developed and published by Square Enix, was revealed prior to the game's release for the eighth generation of video game consoles in November 2016. It was mostly developed by a smaller team from the core Final Fantasy XV staff, supervised by director Hajime Tabata and headed by producer Haruyoshi Sawatari. Both free and paid downloadable content (DLC) were announced: among the DLC released were various promotional content utilised as tie-ins to the base game, such as A King's Tale: Final Fantasy XV as well as additional story elements intended to address player criticisms of the game's narrative structure and missing details.

Three character-driven "Episodes" were released between March and December 2017. Episode Gladiolus, released on March 28, feature Gladiolus Amicitia as the player character along with an appearance by recurring franchise character Gilgamesh. Episode Prompto, released on June 27, takes place during a late-game narrative gap and follows Prompto Argentum as the player character, with the gameplay shifting towards third-person shooting and stealth-based mechanics. Episode Ignis, released on December 13, follows Ignis Scientia as he allies with the Imperial commander Ravus Nox Fleuret to protect Noctis. Episode Ignis was intended to be the final story-based DLC, though positive player feedback resulted in Square Enix wanting to develop further content focusing on other major characters such as Ardyn Izunia. A multiplayer DLC titled Comrades was released in November, which is later superseded by a standalone version in December 2018.

In March 2018, an expanded version of Final Fantasy XV was released for PlayStation 4 and Xbox One as Royal Edition, and for Microsoft Windows as Windows Edition, which contains all pre-order and post-launch DLC published to that point in addition to further story and gameplay additions. Episode Ardyn, the final post-release content pack for Final Fantasy XV, was released in March 2019. Set thirty years prior to the main game, Episode Ardyn details how Ardyn was discovered by the Empire of Niflheim and began his plot of revenge against the Lucian bloodline. Other noteworthy DLC's included time-limited events like the Moogle Chocobo Carnival and Assassin's Festival, as well as crossover content with Final Fantasy XIV and Mistwalker's Terra Wars.

== Development ==
Both free and paid downloadable content (DLC) was planned as early as April 2016, with paid DLC being a necessity due to production costs. Plans for DLC content were finalised by June of that year, with a small team working on it while the main game was completed. The main aim was to make players feel they had made a good purchase. Full production began after the main game was completed in November 2016. The DLC development was handled by Haruyoshi Sawatari, who took over as producer when Tabata saw the game would not make its projected September 30 release date; Tabata continued to focus on polishing the main game, while Sawatari created the DLC with a group of core developers, although Tabata continued to oversee their production. While having story-based DLC focused on each character may be perceived as undermining the main appeal of the story, Sawatari noted that the breaks gave characters a chance to grow as individuals before returning to and strengthening the group. Square Enix insisted when the details were announced that the DLC was not content cut from the game itself, but original content to add new experiences for players.

On the launch date of Final Fantasy XV, A Day One DLC patch was released called the "Crown Update": in addition to gameplay updates such as galleries and the ability to summon monsters to fight, CGI scenes from Kingsglaive and the "Omen" trailer were added, and social media functionality was incorporated to allow photos taken in-game to be uploaded on Facebook and Twitter. The content was the result of added development following the completion of the game. Following the game's release, Square Enix received feedback on aspects relating to its story content and a sequence during Chapter 13 of the main story, where the gameplay style and difficulty shifted drastically. To this end, Square Enix announced free DLC updates that would tweak the gameplay of Chapter 13 and add further story-based cutscenes to expand upon character motivations left unexplained in the base game. The planned DLC included two in-game item packs and three story episodes that feature Noctis' companions as playable characters, and was termed an "Online Expansion Pack". The contents of the Online Expansion Pack is offered alongside a co-op mode for up to four players titled Comrades as season pass content. The amendments to Chapter 13 and other late-game portions were released on March 28, 2017. In March 2018, an expanded version of the game was released for PlayStation 4 and Xbox One as Royal Edition, and for Microsoft Windows as Windows Edition, which contains all post-launch content published to that point in addition to further story and gameplay additions. Players who own copies of Final Fantasy XV had the option to purchase the "Royal Update" to access the additional content, which included new narrative content, free-roam sea traversal, an expanded endgame dungeon, and the "Armiger Unleashed" ability.

In response to popular demand, the team decided to extend DLC support into 2018, focusing on content to expand character stories and the world's lore. The new series of content, called The Dawn of the Future, would focus on creating a new storyline while tying up any remaining loose ends that players found with the storyline and lore. Planning for Episode Ardyn originated with the development of Episode Ardyn Prologue, a short anime feature detailing Ardyn's original fall released on February 12, 2019. An anime short was chosen as its format DLC was scheduled to end with "Episode Ignis" at that point in time. The anime short was produced by Satelight under Square Enix's supervision. Once the decision was made to continue the production of DLC, the team decided to further explore Ardyn's backstory in a playable form. According to its lead staff, the aim was to show more emotion in Ardyn. More acrobatic gameplay from Episode Ignis was incorporated into Episode Ardyn. During this period, production shifted from Business Division 2 to Luminous Productions, who worked simultaneously on the post-release content and their new IP.

Due to structural changes within Square Enix, as a result of Tabata's departure from Square Enix as well as Luminous Productions' decision to focus on the development of their IP, a final decision was made to cancel all post-release support and planned DLC by late-2018. Story material for The Dawn of the Future DLC has been turned into a novel of the same name.

=== Music ===
The music for the downloadable content of Final Fantasy XV was mainly composed by Yoshitaka Suzuki, along with Tetsuya Shibata and Yoshino Aoki. Keiichi Okabe contributed "Shield of the King" and an arrangement of the battle theme "Battle at the Big Bridge" to Episode Gladiolus. Naoshi Mizuta was responsible for the main theme and selected tracks for Episode Prompto. Yasunori Mitsuda composed three pieces for Episode Ignis, while others were contributions by Tadayoshi Makino and Tomomichi Takeoka. The base game's primary composer, Yoko Shimomura, composed "Apocalypsis Magnatus". The theme song for Comrades, "Choosing Hope", was composed by Nobuo Uematsu and sung by Japanese vocalist Emiko Suzuki. Additional music for Comrades was composed by Suzuki, Makino, Tsutomu Narita, and Tomomichi Takeoka and Tai Tomisawa from Makino's company SpinSolfa. The music for Episode Ardyn was co-composed by Kenji Hiramatsu, and anime composer Taku Iwasaki. Rap sections for the track "Conditioned to Hate" were performed by Lotus Juice.

== A King's Tale: Final Fantasy XV ==
A King's Tale: Final Fantasy XV is a standalone game developed by Empty Clip Studios, a studio based in San Diego, in collaboration with Platform, Joe Rothenberg Animation, Powerhouse Animation Studios and Mirum Studio, using the RapidFire Engine. A King's Tale has the visual aesthetic of a 1980s beat 'em up with 16-bit pixel art and a chiptune-like soundtrack, but incorporates a modern combat system that includes magic attacks, companions and summons. It was originally marketed as an exclusive DLC game for customers who pre-ordered Final Fantasy XV from retailers such as GameStop, GAME, and EB Games. A King's Tale launched alongside the base game on November 29, 2016. The game was made downloadable free of charge for all players on the PlayStation 4 and Xbox One in March 2017.

A King's Tale follows the exploits of Regis Lucis Caelum CXIII, the king of Lucis and father of Noctis, as its main character. It is set thirty years before the base game's events, told to a young Noctis by Regis as a fairy tale. In combat, Regis may string together combination moves or "combos" by utilising strong and fast attacks as well as a shield bash, or summon his companions Weskham Armaugh, Clarus Amicitia, and Cid Sophiar to his aid.

=== Reception ===
A King's Tale: Final Fantasy XV

Aggregate score
Aggregator	Score
Metacritic	65/100

Review scores
Publication	Score
Destructoid	7/10
Push Square	6/10
IGN Spain	7/10

A King's Tale: Final Fantasy XV received "mixed or average" reviews on the PlayStation 4, according to review aggregator Metacritic. Several commentators felt that it did not offer anything special, either as a game or as a new entry to the narrative, though its combat system is judged as unexpectedly deep, which may provide an enjoyable experience for some players.

In his review of A King's Tale, Chris Carter from Destructoid described it as "the opening salvo" from the marketing campaign for Final Fantasy XV, though he wished it was a properly developed video game project instead of a being relegated to bonus content. Carter noted that the overall aesthetic felt like a homage to a SNES video game, as well as Capcom-developed platformer games like Adventures in the Magic Kingdom. Carter concluded that the game will be appreciated with players who enjoy old-school beat-'em-ups, as did José L. Ortega from the Spanish edition of IGN, who also praised A King's Tale as a good tribute to the franchise.

Jacob Hull from Push Square found that A King's Tale further expands upon the personality of Noctis and his relationship with Regis, who lacked development in the series' other media. In his view, King's Tale competently embraced both the charm and limitations of retrogaming from both a graphical and animation point of view. In spite of what he perceived as "some lazy moments of design and unnecessarily repetitive combat sequences", Hull said A King's Tale has an unexpectedly good combat system as well as a pleasantly "nostalgia-inducing presentation".

== Episodes ==
The main post-launch DLC "Episodes" focused on filling in narrative gaps related to the main cast of characters and their experiences during their absence in the main story. Episode Gladiolus, Episode Prompto and Episode Ignis were released respectively in March, June and December 2017. Episode Ignis was planned to be the last post-release DLC, though reception of the first wave of story-based DLC was so strong that the team decided to create a second wave of content. Originally part of a tetralogy of story-based DLC episodes dubbed The Dawn of the Future, the release of Episode Ardyn in March 2019 marked the end of post-release support for Final Fantasy XV.

=== Plot ===
In Episode Gladiolus, Gladiolus tests his strength against recurring Final Fantasy character Gilgamesh. Following his initial confrontation with Ravus, Gladiolus leaves the party to seek guidance from the leader of the Kingsglaive, Cor Leonis, who leads him to challenge Gilgamesh and claim his legendary sword.

Episode Prompto follows the titular character after Ardyn tricks Noctis into throwing him from the train to Tenebrae. Waking up inside an Imperial research facility, Prompto discovers his true origin as an experimental clone of the mad scientist Verstael Besithia, designed as one of Niflheim's Magitek soldiers. With help from the mercenary Aranea Highwind, Prompto defeats Verstael—who transfers his soul into the Magitek machine Immortalis to conquer the world of Eos—before heading for Gralea.

Episode Ignis follows Ignis during the Imperial assault on Altissia and allies with a disillusioned Ravus in the wake of the Astral Leviathan's rampage to attempt a rescue of Noctis and Lunafreya Nox Fleuret. After finding Lunafreya dead and Noctis unconscious, they are ambushed by Ardyn; Ignis takes the Ring of the Lucii, borne exclusively by the Kings of Lucis, and uses it to fight off Ardyn, which costs him his eyesight. In an alternate ending, he surrenders to Ardyn and gains knowledge that allows Noctis to save Eos without sacrificing himself.

In Episode Ardyn, a prequel to the base game, Ardyn is revealed to have been imprisoned on Angelgard for two millennia by his brother Somnus after the Astrals denounce him for absorbing the Starscourge from victims. Ardyn's beloved Aera, Lunafreya's ancestor, was killed during the confrontation before Ardyn was sealed away. When Ardyn led an assault on Insomnia sometime after his liberation by Niflheim, he discovers that he was chosen by the Astrals to become a sacrificial vessel for the Starscourge; he reluctantly submits to this fate in exchange for revenge against Somnus's bloodline.

=== Reception ===
Aggregate review scores
Game	Metacritic
Episode Gladiolus	(PS4) 59/100
Episode Prompto	(PS4) 65/100
Episode Ardyn	(PS4) 60/100

According to review aggregator Metacritic, Episode Gladiolus, Episode Ignis and Episode Ardyn all received "mixed or average" reviews on the PlayStation 4.

The Spanish edition of IGN summarised Episode Gladiolus as an add-on that compliments the main narrative, but does not offer anything new or interesting during its playtime of two hours. Chris Carter from Destructoid found Episode Gladiolus to be "slightly above average or simply inoffensive", noting that he had hoped for a bit more of the character interactions from the base game, and felt that "Episode" format seems to be more fitting of a compilation edition bundle as opposed to standalone DLC. Jonathan Leack said the aspect he disliked most about Episode Gladiolus is that it abandoned most of the qualities that made Final Fantasy XV good, opting to focus on a "dull character" as opposed to the expansive world setting of Eos. Andrew Webster of The Verge found the character development lacking in the absence of Gladiolus's companions, though RPGFan's Peter Triezenberg enjoyed the interactions between Gladiolus and Cor.

Several reviewers suggested that Episode Prompto encapsulates the best and worst aspects of Final Fantasy XV, but praised Prompto's portrayal and storyline despite some clichéd or clashing elements, and lauded his interactions with Aranea. Adam Vitale from RPG Site called Episode Prompto a significant improvement to Episode Gladiolus and works well enough to fill a gap in the base game in spite of the slight "awkwardness" of its narrative and game mechanics. Jason Schreier from Kotaku was in agreement with regards to the superior quality of Episode Prompto over its predecessor, and noted that while the gunplay is not as satisfying as a proper shooter video game, "mowing down Magitek soldiers with a stolen machine gun" was still fun. Webster compared it to "a brief, thrilling action movie" that packs a lot of content into its short playtime of two hours. Conversely, the Spanish edition of IGN said that Episode Prompto is a short and unsatisfying experience that made Episode Gladiolus look better than it was. Robert Ramsey from Push Square criticised the DLC's gameplay mechanics and said it is difficult to recommend.

Carter called Episode Ignis the best DLC episode to that point, praising its relation to the main narrative as well as Ignis' portrayal. Ramsey described its additional story elements as indispensable for players who are invested in the series, and praised Ignis' "flashy, fast, and fluid fighting style" that keeps combat scenarios engaging. He concluded that Episode Ignis is the most impactful character-driven DLC and suggested that future content should build upon the positive example it set. Triezenberg enjoyed the narrative, and felt the alternate storyline featured in the DLC provided some good character development for Ignis, Noctis and Ardyn.

Mike Fahey from Kotaku praised Ardyn's portrayal as the setting's overarching antagonist, citing Episode Ardyn and its anime tie-in as highlights for his character development and making his vendetta against Noctis's family "fully justified". RPG Site's George Foster said the DLC "manages to turn a previously interesting, but oftentimes one-note villain, into a sympathetic figure", but concluded that the DLC as a whole is held back by repetitive gameplay that doesn't really live up to Episode Ignis or Episode Prompto, with its few redeeming factors being its story and how it expands on the lore of its fictional universe. Hirun Cryer from USGamer faulted Ardyn's overarching characterisation and saying Episode Ardyn's narrative undermined the work done during the anime tie-in, while Eurogamer Italy said Episode Ardyn prioritises fan service at the expense of narrative coherence.

== Final Fantasy XV Multiplayer: Comrades ==
A story-driven multiplayer mode called Final Fantasy XV Multiplayer: Comrades was released in November 2017. The latter is an expansion that allows online multiplayer battles with up to four players. Titled Comrades, it takes place during the ten-year gap in the game's narrative, focusing on player-created members of the Kingsglaive combating powerful monsters. With the release of Comrades, Final Fantasy XV became the first mainline single-player Final Fantasy game to feature multiplayer content. Using the in-game city of Lestallum as their base, the player is assigned missions with three other characters—either other players or AI-controlled. During missions, the player fights monsters either on sorties or to defend transports; at the end of each mission, the player is awarded Gil, materials used for crafting and enhancing weapons, and "Meteorshards", which can power up settlements around Lestallum and open up new quests. Some areas unlock Royal Tombs that grant the player a Royal Sigil; these Sigils both increase specific statistics and grant new themed abilities such as healing or increasing combat moves. The player has access to a variety of weapon types from normal swords to maces and shurikens, which are enhanced using materials to increase passive abilities such as their damage capacity.

A standalone version of Comrades was released in December 2018; this version included ten new bosses and several other expansions. With the standalone version's release, the original version would cease functioning and those who had purchased it would receive the new version for free. A planned PC version was cancelled, but the PC version of the original Comrades would continue to function. Online functionality for Comrades was shut down in June 2020, though its offline functionality would remain.

=== Plot ===
The player assumes control of a survivor of the Kingsglaive, a former bodyguard of Regis who abandoned him during Niflheim's attack on Lucis. Despite the peoples' mistrust, the Kingsglaive help defend humanity's last stronghold of Lestallum while experiencing visions of Noctis's resting place on the island of Angelgard. Drawn to Angelgard, the Kingsglaive face Bahamut in combat and are absolved of their treachery, dedicating themselves to protecting Angelgard from Daemons during Noctis's slumber.

=== Reception ===
Reception

Aggregate score
Aggregator	Score
Metacritic	64/100

Review scores
Publication	Score
Push Square	5/10
Gameblog.fr	5/10

Comrades received "mixed or average" reviews on the PlayStation 4, according to review aggregator Metacritic.

Ramsey was of the view that Comrades was a missed opportunity. He said it has basis for a good "co-op-based grind" and found the bite-sized missions to be enjoyable, but criticized the constant bouts of loading time, which make the whole experience felt like a chore for him. He formed the view that the base game's underdeveloped combat system is inadequate to support an entire expansion. While he felt that the overall experience may improve with a few patched updates, the long loading times of Comrade overshadowed its positive aspects and that it is difficult for him to recommend to anyone other than dedicated fans of the main game. Gameblog.fr also criticized the long wait times, and wondered why the developers bothered to work on an online version of the base game.

Alex Donaldson from VG247 compared Comrades to the Bungie-developed Destiny, and described it as "a solid proof of concept" for future projects of a similar nature. Donaldson identified its weaknesses as a product of being built as "an afterthought" for a single-player game, but nevertheless praised it as an impressive effort to tell a proper Final Fantasy story in a multiplayer setting with remarkably good results, as it is conceptually based on strong ideas for a multiplayer Final Fantasy experience. Donaldson also praised its theme tune by longtime franchise composer Nobuo Uematsu. Joshua Rivera from GQ Magazine took the view that Comrades succeeded in entertaining him and his colleagues, regardless of its questionable or uneven quality.

== Other content ==
- The following DLC's were available as pre-order exclusives from select retailers: the "Blazefire Saber", "Masamune", "Gae Bolg" and "Mage Mashers" weapon packs; and "Travel Pack", "Camera Kit", "Angler Set" and "Gourmand Set" item packs.
- The "Booster Pack" and "Holiday Pack", post-launch DLC's that are available as part of the base game's season pass and later its multiplatform expanded edition, add powerful in-game weapons, equipment, and cosmetic items.
- The "Moogle Chocobo Carnival", a carnival event with minigames themed around the Final Fantasy series Chocobo and Moogle mascots, ran from January to February 2017. The Carnival was brought back between July and August of that year. A particular item that unlocked a themed costume was offered during the second Chocobo Carnival.
- From August 2017 to January 2018, the game featured a limited time collaboration with Ubisoft title Assassin's Creed Origins, with a story quest and special accessories themed after the game. The collaboration also saw elements from Final Fantasy XV included in Assassin's Creed Origins.
- A free playable side quest, released on September 24, 2018, feature Noctis teaming up with Sarah, the main character of the Mistwalker-developed mobile game Terra Wars. The collaboration was released alongside accessories for Comrades themed after Shadow of the Tomb Raider.
- A free collaboration event featuring a crossover with Final Fantasy XIV was released on December 12, 2018. As part of the side quest, Noctis and his party team up with a Miqo'te named Y'jhimei and fight Garuda, a primal deity from Eorzea, the setting of XIV.
