= Characters of Final Fantasy XV =

Promotional artwork by Yuki Matsuzawa featuring the core and supporting cast of Final Fantasy XV and its expanded media. Top from left: Aranea Highwind, Ardyn Izunia, Idolas Aldercapt, Iris Amicitia, Nyx Ulric, Regis Lucis Caelum, Ravus Nox Fleuret, Lunafreya Nox Fleuret, Gentiana/Shiva, Cid Sophiar, Cor Leonis, Gladiolus Amicitia, Noctis Lucis Caelum, Prompto Argentum, Ignis Scientia, Cindy Aurum, and Carbuncle.

Final Fantasy XV, an action role-playing video game released in November 2016, is the fifteenth main installment in the Final Fantasy series, and is thematically connected to Fabula Nova Crystallis Final Fantasy, a subseries of games linked by a common mythos which includes Final Fantasy XIII and Final Fantasy Type-0. The world and main characters were created by Tetsuya Nomura, the game's original director. Nomura also designed the main characters, with later revisions and additional characters being designed by Yusuke Naora: other character designers involved with the game included Roberto Ferrari and Yusaku Nakaaki.

The story revolves around a conflict between the nations of Lucis and Niflheim for control of the magical Crystal. The main protagonist is Noctis Lucis Caelum, the sole heir to the throne of Lucis. On his journey, he has three companions: Gladiolus Amicitia, the heir to a family of royal bodyguards; Ignis Scientia, Noctis's strategist and personal attendant; and Prompto Argentum, a friend and schoolmate from a lower-class family. A key character is Lunafreya Nox Fleuret, Noctis's fiancée through an arranged marriage. Other characters include Noctis's father Regis, the king of Lucis; Cor Leonis, a famous warrior of Lucis; Iris, Gladiolus's sister; the mechanic Cindy Aurum and her grandfather Cid Sophiar, who provide services for Noctis' car, the Regalia. The main antagonist Ardyn Izunia is supported by the forces of Niflheim under emperor Iedolas Aldercapt and his chief scientist Verstael Besithia, Lunafreya's brother Ravus Nox Fleuret, and the mercenary dragoon Aranea Highwind.

Originally a spin-off game titled Final Fantasy Versus XIII, the game changed multiple times during its ten-year development cycle, including the redesign or removal of characters and story elements. Additional media and merchandise based upon the world and characters of XV have been produced, with its expanded media being dubbed the "Final Fantasy XV Universe": these include the original net animation Brotherhood, the CGI feature film Kingsglaive, numerous pieces of story-based downloadable content (DLC), and a novel The Dawn of the Future based on a cancelled second series of DLC.

Reception of its characters has been mixed; while the playable cast and its interactions have been met with frequent praise, underuse of its supporting cast and handling of female characters like Cindy were frequently criticized. It also saw commentary on its portrayal of gender roles and character disability. The additional media saw mixed reaction; Brotherhood was praised for its character development, while Kingsglaive was met with frequent criticism. The DLC episodes received varied reactions, though many critics praised their expansions on the characters.

== Concept and creation ==
The concept and setting of Final Fantasy XV, initially a spin-off titled Final Fantasy Versus XIII, (Note: ファイナルファンタジーヴェルサスXIII (Fainaru Fantajī Verusasu Sātīn)) was created by original director Tetsuya Nomura. Initially in development for PlayStation 3, Versus XIII was shifted to the eighth generation consoles PlayStation 4 and Xbox One. During this transition, Final Fantasy Type-0 director Hajime Tabata became co-director; later in development, he assumed full directorial duties from Nomura. The development period ultimately lasted about ten years, although Tabata now refers to Versus XIII and XV as different games. The game was originally part of Fabula Nova Crystallis Final Fantasy, a collection of games united by a common mythology and shared themes. When it was renamed, XV was "disconnected" from Fabula Nova Crystallis; although the mythos was retained, its role in the story was reduced and its unique terminology was removed to aid with marketing and provide Final Fantasy XV with an individual identity. (Note: Quote: ――ではもうひとつ。神話や神についての設定は、『FFヴェルサスXIII』から『FFXV』への移行により変更があるのでしょうか。 田畑: 『FFXV』にする段階で、そこまでに固まっていた設定については、神話とは強く絡めず『FFXV』の設定として取り込んでいます。ファブラの神話として出てくるものではありませんが、ベースとして活きています。) A surviving theme from the mythos was the struggles of humans chosen by a divine crystal.

The central concept behind the world of XV is "a fantasy based on reality": the setting is based on the real world and the fantasy elements grew out of familiar settings. Realizing this aspect of the game was quite difficult for Nomura before the game's move onto eighth-generation hardware. While the story was similar to other entries, he wanted to create more realistic characters. His ambition was to make XV "about man in the real world", including less fantasy elements. He also described XV as the darkest entry in the series, acknowledging that this atmosphere might narrow its target audience while feeling that the time was right for such characters. Nomura wanted to depict a story centered on a group of men traveling the world, much like that of a road movie. This approach was inspired by experiences from his youth, in which he often witnessed single-gender groups taking extended trips. Nomura also did not want the protagonists to be drawn together by a grand destiny, instead being natural friends confronted with bizarre and dangerous situations. To help convey the road movie theme, the team created towns featuring both strange and familiar elements, taking inspiration from the opening scenes of Back to the Future Part II.

The initial story themes were "misery" and "bonds", with characters representing these themes through their actions and circumstances. It was intended to be a painful story emphasizing the power of friendship. The theme of bonds was represented by the relationships between Noctis and his comrades, as well as him and his father Regis. A key narrative element was Noctis' personal journey from prince to king. The original script was written by Kazushige Nojima, who described his story for Versus XIII as "Myth vs. Reality". When Versus XIII became FInal Fantasy XV, multiple aspects were changed. A scene that was removed was the original opening, in which Noctis met another character at a treaty-signing party, then had to escape Lucis when the forces of Niflheim attacked; those scenes were changed to have the group being away at the time of the invasion. However, other characters revealed during earlier trailers were retained and would have important roles in the story. When consulted over how his original draft could be reworked, Nojima said that he would be content as long as the overall concept remained faithful to the original. This gave the team the confidence to rework and realize the original story within XV. Around two thirds of the planned scenario ended up being cut. This rewriting was primarily done by Saori Itamuro, who was credited as "Lead Scenario Designer".

The story takes place over a ten-year period, and the characters' appearances were altered as they aged: this bucked the trend of many similar JRPGs, with the team wanting to properly represent the characters growing through their journey. The game's opening depicts a scene late in the game; this approach was inspired by Crisis Core: Final Fantasy VII, which featured a conclusion linked to the original Final Fantasy VII. In both cases, the developers wanted players to experience a sequence of events leading up to a known conclusion. The ending was left deliberately ambiguous so that players could develop their own interpretations. For both Versus XIII and XV, game staff stated that it would likely be the saddest Final Fantasy story to date. Alongside the serious plot, elements of light comedy were added as a counterbalance. A large amount of dialogue was conveyed using in-game conversations instead of cutscenes. Nomura also wanted the dialogue to sound "natural and not game-like or lofty". Final Japanese voice casting for the game began in 2010.

=== Character design ===
When the transition was made from Versus XIII to XV, multiple story elements and characters were changed or removed. One of the major changes was the replacement of Stella (above) with Lunafreya (below) as the main heroine.

In contrast to many previous Final Fantasy titles, the playable cast of Final Fantasy XV has all male characters. This concept was chosen by Nomura from the outset, and was agreed upon by Tabata despite some later reservations on his part. However, women still have significant roles in the story, with Tabata noting in an interview that it is "not healthy to have a bias in genders". The game's main cast was designed by Nomura. The clothing for characters was designed by Hiromu Takahara, lead designer for Japanese fashion house Roen. Takahara's involvement principally came due to the detail needed for the costumes, which were inspired by western fashion: designing them himself would have been time-consuming for Nomura to do along with his other duties, which included designing characters for Final Fantasy XIII. He also wanted to continue to express the game's realism through the character outfits. The design trait for the main characters was "jet-black", while the character's clothing utilized Roen's distinctive asymmetrical styling. Roen's designs were kept in the game when it became XV, as the team felt it would be wrong to remove them. The changeover from Versus XIII to XV resulted in the redesign of characters such as Regis, and the replacement of the previous main heroine Stella with the similarly named Lunafreya. A result of the shift onto new hardware was that the art style moved away from the "stylized" look required by earlier hardware limitations. To help maximize the realism of the characters, their hair was first created by a hairstylist using a mannequin's wig, then rendered into the game using the technology of the Luminous Studio engine. The same technique was used for Agni's Philosophy, the engine's demo at E3 2012.

Ardyn, Gentiana, Iris, Aranea, Umbra, Cindy, Cid, and Verstael were designed by Roberto Ferrari, who had previously done work on Type-0 and was involved with the project from its earlier development as Versus XIII. These designs were completed by 2010, when the project was still known as Versus XIII. Ferrari was brought onboard the project in 2010 after an unidentified female designer resigned from the project, as her art was repeatedly rejected by the developers. The change and subsequent alterations to the game's content meant that many of Ferrari's character designs went unused. This was something he was openly frustrated about, as he considered these unseen characters more visually striking than his surviving designs. Many of his surviving character designs were altered during later development, including those for Gentiana and Umbra. Ardyn and Aranea remained mostly unchanged. Another contributing artist was Yusaku Nakaaki, who helped design Cindy Aurum. Tabata thought of Cindy as a cheerful and active character, and believed that her appearance combined with such personality traits would not be problematic for audiences who might otherwise expect more modest clothing from her. The party's black garb were retained as a reference to the concepts of "death worship" present in Versus XIII, which were cut to avoid changing too much for regional censorship laws. Black remained an important color in-game due to its connection to the Lucian royal family. Aera and Somnus were respectively based physically on Lunafreya and Noctis, while a young version of Verstael was physically based on Prompto.

=== Expanded media ===
To avoid spreading the narrative of Final Fantasy XV into multiple games, the team created a multimedia universe surrounding the game; these included a special prequel demo titled Platinum Demo, the feature film Kingsglaive: Final Fantasy XV, and the original net animation Brotherhood: Final Fantasy XV. The central theme for the overall story of XV was the bond between father and son: Kingsglaive represented this theme from Regis' point of view. The film also salvaged a large section of the original narrative that was cut from the game. Brotherhood focuses on themes of brotherhood and friendship, and includes interpersonal scenes that could not be included in the game. Lunafreya was highlighted as the "keystone" connecting the game, the film, and the anime series together. While the media universe was expanded, Tabata divided the two phases between pre-release media and post-release downloadable content (DLC) and spin-off titles. The story also continued in Comrades, a multiplayer-focused expansion set during the ten-year narrative gap and focusing on the titular faction from Kingsglaive.

The DLC was split into three episodes covering Gladiolus, Prompto, and Ignis during periods they were separated from Noctis. The online multiplayer expansion filled the ten-year gap in the narrative A second series of DLC episodes was commissioned under the title The Dawn of the Future, which was intended to create an alternate series of events and allow a better ending where the lead characters defy their fates. Prior to this, an anime short centered around Ardyn's past was also planned, expanding into its own DLC episode. The basic scenario were written by Toru Osanai. Due to several factors, only Episode Ardyn was released, with the other three episodes being cancelled. The scrapped content was instead turned into a novel of the same name, written by Emi Nagashima based on the draft scenario; the novel was released in 2019 in Japan and 2020 in the West.

=== Localization ===
The English localization of XV was led by Dan Inoue. One of the aspects of the localization was using different accents to show the characters coming from different regions of the world: a cited example was Ignis, who spoke with a British accent while the other main characters spoke with an American accent. For the game's lore, the team made a conscious effort to move away from the esoteric terminology Final Fantasy had gained a reputation for. They used understandable names like "Astral" and "Daemon". To stop the lore becoming uninteresting, the divine beings' speech was made very impersonal—such as Gentiana not using "I" or "You" during her dialogue—and using interpretive dialogue for simple concepts. Different issues raised later included Ignis' localized lines, which changed aspects of the character interaction, and the alteration of Cindy's name from the original "Cidney".

In an interview with Famitsu during Gamescom, Tabata revealed that the main reason for the delays in XV's release were related to the game's localization and debugging, as the team wanted to bring the game out in the west close to its Japanese release. The decision for a simultaneous release meant the localization had to happen alongside the game production, with no extra time for tweaks and corrections. In addition to being released with French and German dubs and text translation for those respective regions, it was also localized for Latin America with Latin American Spanish and Brazilian Portuguese text: this was the first time a Final Fantasy title was localized into these languages.

One of the early issues, which drew public attention with the release of Episode Duscae, was Noctis' English voice actor. In Episode Duscae, his voice was pitched rather low, making the character seem older and less energetic than his Japanese counterpart. This was explained as being due to tight scheduling removing the opportunity for Tabata to catch the issue and re-record before it was time for release. After Episode Duscae, the voice work was redone to better convey Noctis' personality. The team needed to deal with the clash between normal dialogue and the fantastic elements, which threatened to undermine the narrative. This forced the different pieces of media to take different approaches, and some scripted character interactions to join up the different sides of the narrative. The game's localization methods ended up backfiring after release due to the dialogue matching mechanism for characters causing line repetition or omission.

== Main characters ==
=== Noctis Lucis Caelum ===
Noctis Lucis Caelum (ノクティス・ルシス・チェラム, Nokutisu Rushisu Cheramu) is the protagonist of XV. He is the crown prince of Lucis, with the Crystal having chosen him as the legendary True King when he was five years old. At the game's beginning, he is en route to the city of Altissia for his arranged marriage with Lunafreya when he receives the news of Lucis's invasion by Niflheim. He eventually becomes the True King, a figure who saves Eos from a plague of darkness called the Starscourge at the cost of his life. In The Dawn of the Future, Noctis ends up rebelling against his role, succeeding in both saving Lunafreya and purging Eos of the Starscourge while surviving. Noctis is voiced by Tatsuhisa Suzuki in Japanese and Ray Chase in English.

=== Lunafreya Nox Fleuret ===
Lunafreya Nox Fleuret (ルナフレーナ・ノックス・フルーレ, Runafurēna Nokkusu Furūre; Lunafrena Nox Fleuret), "Luna" (ルーナ, Rūna) for short, is one of the central figures in Noctis' journey. During the events of Final Fantasy XV, Lunafreya travels ahead of Noctis, ensuring the Astrals grant him their power while guiding him through her companion Gentiana, the human form of the Astral Shiva. As she is persuading with the Astral Leviathan, Ardyn fatally stabs her, with her giving the Ring of the Lucii to Noctis before dying. It is later revealed that speaking with the Astrals was slowly killing her, and she had been counting on her brother Ravus to finish what she started. Lunafreya continues to support Noctis as a spirit, aiding him directly in his final confrontation with Ardyn before reuniting with him in the afterlife. In The Dawn of the Future, Bahamut resurrects her to become a replacement for the rebellious Ardyn; despite initially falling in line, Lunafreya decides to rebel against his wish to purge Eos of life, ultimately surviving and reuniting with Noctis. Lunafreya is voiced by Rina Kitagawa in Japanese and Amy Shiels in English. In Kingsglaive, she is voiced by Shioli Kutsuna in Japanese and Lena Headey in English.

=== Ardyn Izunia ===
Ardyn Izunia (アーデン・イズニア, Āden Izunia) is the main antagonist of XV and the protagonist of Episode Ardyn. He is initially introduced as Niflheim's Imperial Chancellor, who is regarded as both its main political force running the empire and benefactor of its advances in Magitek technology. He orchestrates the events leading to Niflheim's invasion of Insomnia while guiding Noctis in forming Covenants with the Astrals so he can kill him once he becomes the True King. Ardyn reveals his motives by fatally wounding Lunafreya after she summons Leviathan, then harassing Noctis by tricking him into attacking Prompto. When Noctis reaches the Crystal, he reveals the truth of their kinship and his birth name as Ardyn Lucis Caelum (アーデン・ルシス・チェラム, Āden Rushisu Cheramu), a healer from an ancient era who cured Starscourge patients by taking it into his own body. The growing Starscourge renders him immortal, but caused his brother Somnus to ostracize him and the Crystal to reject him. After ten years, Ardyn faces Noctis in combat after sending the infected Ifrit and Lucii—embodiments of past Lucian monarchs—to attack him. Noctis destroys Ardyn's body then his spirit, completing his role and purging Eos of the Starscourge. Episode Ardyn reveals that during an assault on Insomnia 30 years prior to the game, Ardyn learned the Astrals had chosen him to become a sacrificial vessel as part of a solution for the Starscourge; he reluctantly submits to this fate in exchange for revenge against Somnus's bloodline. In The Dawn of the Future, Ardyn instead rebels against Bahamut's will, ultimately allying with Noctis and Lunafreya to defeat Bahamut. Ardyn is voiced by Keiji Fujiwara in Japanese and Darin De Paul in English.

=== Gladiolus Amicitia ===
Gladiolus Amicitia (グラディオラス・アミシティア, Guradiorasu Amishitia), who is known as Gladio by his close friends, is the protagonist of Episode Gladiolus. He is the eldest son of a noble family pledged to the protection of the Lucian royal family. Gladiolus serves as Noctis' most loyal companion and a foil for his impulsive nature. Despite initially disliking Noctis for his cold attitude when they first met as children, he warmed up to him while protecting his sister Iris and the two developed a brotherly relationship. During the course of the story, Gladiolus assumes the role of the Shield of the King to protect Noctis like his father Clarus before him. He is briefly demoralized after Ravus easily defeats him, and leaves the party to go on a personal quest in Episode Gladiolus to grow his strength. The events at Altissia and Ignis' injury drive a brief wedge between Gladiolus and Noctis until Ignis forces a reconciliation between them. Gladiolus and Ignis later make their way through the Niflheim fortress Zegnautus Keep after being separated from Noctis, encountering the Daemon form of Niflheim's emperor Iedolas Aldercapt and seeing footage of Ravus' death. Gladiolus, along with Noctis' other companions, become Daemon Hunters until his return, and accompany him in the final battle against Ardyn.

Gladiolus' design and role was established from an early stage: as the King's Shield, he was more than a part of Noctis' entourage, having trained all his life to protect him. With this in mind, he was given a muscular design and an outspoken personality, with his other hobbies and quirks fitted around that. Gladiolus's original design was dubbed a "straight muscleman" by Naora, but was redesigned to appear more intellectual for Final Fantasy XV. His eyes were also narrowed to give him a "sultry gaze off into the distance". For the musculature of his chest and midriff, which was designed to appear realistic and in keep with his lifelong training, martial artists and other similar real-life figures were used as references.

Gladiolus is voiced by Kenta Miyake in Japanese and Chris Parson in English. When deciding upon Gladiolus' English vocal performance, Inoue's guideline was to make him sound like a young version of John McClane, the main protagonist of the Die Hard film series. Parson found voicing Gladiolus odd, as his physique and personality were almost the exact opposite to the character.

=== Ignis Scientia ===
Ignis Scientia (イグニス・スキエンティア, Igunisu Sukientia), who is known as Iggy by his close friends, is the protagonist of Episode Ignis. Having been raised alongside Noctis to be his advisor and provided with an extensive education, he developed a collected composure and tactical instinct. Ignis acts as Noctis' confidant and helper, forming a deep connection to him during their youth when Noctis began realizing his eventual fate of becoming king. Ignis is blinded during the battle with Leviathan when he wields the Ring of the Lucii to drive Ardyn away from an unconscious Noctis. His blindness causes tension within the group until he forces a reconciliation. Like Noctis's other companions, Ignis becomes a Daemon Hunter and accompanies him in the final battle against Ardyn. Ignis is voiced by Mamoru Miyano in Japanese and Adam Croasdell in English.

=== Prompto Argentum ===
Prompto Argentum (プロンプト・アージェンタム, Puronputo Ājentamu) is the protagonist of Episode Prompto. He is a friend of Noctis from a lower-class family, dating back to their teenage years. On their journey, Prompto acts to lighten the atmosphere of the party, taking on burdens for others and lifting their spirits with his antics. He was initially a shy and obese child when he first met Noctis at school, but a chance encounter with one of Lunafreya's messenger dogs prompted Lunafreya to ask him to be Noctis' friend—Prompto then slimmed down and built up his confidence, ending up firm friends with Noctis when they meet again in high school. During their journey to Niflheim, Ardyn tricks Noctis into knocking Prompto from the train, leading to Niflheim's forces capturing him. Upon being found, Prompto reveals he is actually from Niflheim and was a baby designed to become a Magitek soldier but was spirited away to Lucis. Like the other companions, Prompto became a Daemon Hunter during the ten-year wait and accompanies him in the final battle against Ardyn. Prompto is voiced by Tetsuya Kakihara in Japanese and Robbie Daymond in English. As a child, he is voiced by Aki Kaneda in Japanese and Griffin Burns in English.

== Other characters ==
=== Regis Lucis Caelum CXIII ===
Regis Lucis Caelum CXIII (レギス・ルシス・チェラム113世, Regisu Rushisu Cheramu Hyakujūsansei) is the king of Lucis and Noctis' father. As the ruling king of Lucis, he safeguards the Crystal and protects Insomnia using a magical barrier called the Wall using the hereditary Ring of the Lucii. Maintaining the Wall drains Regis of his life energy, causing him to age rapidly. Brotherhood reveals that Regis fought off the Daemon that almost killed Noctis, but the two become estranged as Regis's health failed to meet the Wall's energy demands and Noctis had to come to terms with his future as Lucis's king. He fought against Ardyn in Episode Ardyn, almost dying at his hands. When Regis accepted Niflheim's peace offer despite knowing it is a trap, he sent Noctis away from the chaos that would ensue in the events of Kingsglaive. After losing the Ring of the Lucii when Niflheim's General Glauca cuts it from his hand, Regis dies fighting him despite Lunafreya wanting to save him. Regis reappears as one of the Lucii when Noctis sacrifices himself to end the Starscourge and destroy Ardyn, delivering the final blow.

A character carried over from Versus XIII, Regis underwent a major redesign during development, becoming older in appearance. This was due to Regis's expanding role in Kingsglaive and the new technology available. The development team wanted to create a more expressive character and aged him to properly convey his exhaustion coming from his use of magic to uphold the kingdom's protective barrier. Due to this, his in-game incarnation was redesigned to better fit with his portrayal in Kingsglaive. The redesign was also chosen as his original design no longer fit into the reworked story of Final Fantasy XV. Regis's motion capture and physical model were provided by British actor Jon Campling.

Regis is featured as the player character in the spin-off title A King's Tale, where he is accompanied by his steward Weskham Armaugh, his protector Clarus Amicitia, and his friend Cid Sophiar. The game's story is portrayed as a fairy tale told by Regis to a young Noctis. Regis is voiced by Tsutomu Isobe in Japanese and Jim Pirri in English; in Kingsglaive, he is voiced in English by Sean Bean.

=== Aranea Highwind ===
Aranea Highwind (アラネア・ハイウィンド, Aranea Haiuindo) is the commodore of Niflheim's Third Army Z-Corps 87th Airborne Unit, a group of Daemon hunters and mercenaries Niflheim employed. Due to her prowess in aerial combat, she is known as "the Dragoon". Over the course of the story, she becomes increasingly uncomfortable with the empire's actions—particularly in capturing Daemons for experimentation—and ultimately severs ties with them, instead using her resources to aid refugees. She later appears in Episode Prompto, where Noctis sends her to find Prompto. She chastises Prompto for doubting Noctis and refuses his help in fighting Verstael until he overcomes it. In The Dawn of the Future, Aranea helps imperial citizens escape the capital of Niflheim, Gralea, and takes down a Diamond Weapon Ardyn brought to destroy it, later aiding Lunafreya and Noctis in their battle against Bahamut.

Aranea was designed by Ferrari. Compared to other characters, Aranea—who was designed in mid-2010—underwent few changes during the game's development. The only notable change was to her weapon, which was altered due to being deemed "unsuitable". Two characters closely connected to her, Biggs and Wedge, originally had major roles with unique designs; they were eventually reduced to a minor role with Niflheim NPC character models. Aranea is voiced by Miyuki Sawashiro in Japanese and Kari Wahlgren in English. According to Wahlgren, Aranea is morally ambiguous with a "sexy dark streak", a tonal departure from the roles she usually played.

=== Cor Leonis ===
Cor Leonis (コル・リオニス, Koru Rionisu) is the Marshal of the Crownsguard and a famous warrior of Lucis. He is known as "the Immortal" (不死将軍, Fushi Shōgun), a name he earned as a teenager for being the only survivor of a Lucian squad that encountered the supernatural swordsman Gilgamesh, managing to cut off his arm despite losing his sword to him. When he was younger, he fought alongside King Regis against the forces of Niflheim, being friends with Gladiolus's father Clarus. He helps the party early on in Noctis's hunt for the Royal Arms, magical weapons tied to Noctis's family. In Comrades, he continues to support the Kingsglaive, halting any search for Noctis on orders from Gentiana. He later rallies the soldiers of Lucis around Noctis when he returns, and helps him directly during the assault on Insomnia.

Cor was one of the characters created for Versus XIII, initially designed as the fifth permanent playable character who joined the group during the course of the game. When transitioning from Versus XIII to Final Fantasy XV, Cor was retained, but his role was reduced to a non-playable mentor figure. This was because the team decided to focus on the dynamics within the core group of similarly aged men, feeling that an older man would not be compatible with their plans. His character went otherwise unchanged. He acts as a temporary party member during certain points, following the party in order to protect Noctis and his group, occasionally joining them in battle. Cor's Japanese voice actor, Hiroki Tōchi, was originally cast as Noctis's chauffeur in Versus XIII before its transition to Final Fantasy XV. Cor is voiced in English by Matthew Mercer. Cor, depicted as a mature background figure of authority, was a character Mercer had not played before in his career.

=== Iris Amicitia ===
Iris Amicitia (イリス・アミシティア, Irisu Amishitia) is the younger sister of Gladiolus and a childhood friend of Noctis. When she was a child, Noctis shielded her from trouble when she got lost in the grounds of Regis's palace; her later confession to Gladiolus helped soften his view of Noctis. She escaped Insomnia during Niflheim's invasion, taking refuge in Lestallum. Iris is depicted as having a carefree attitude and is close to all four of the party members; particularly Noctis, whom she has a crush on. She occasionally employs a doll made in the likeness of a Moogle during combat situations. During Noctis's slumber, Iris becomes one of the most notorious Daemon hunters in the world, being dubbed "the Daemon Slayer". Iris is voiced by Megumi Han in Japanese and Eden Riegel in English.

=== Iedolas Aldercapt ===
Iedolas Aldercapt (イドラ・エルダーキャプト, Idora Erudākyaputo) is the emperor of Niflheim and an antagonist in XV. At the game's beginning, he has withdrawn from frontline politics, delegating the task of administrating his empire to Ardyn. Nevertheless, he retains an active role within Niflheim's political scene. Aldercapt's ambition is to use the Crystal to grant Niflheim world domination. The Dawn of the Future reveals that Aldercapt's attitude was a result of losing his family during the war against Lucis and Ardyn's manipulation. Ardyn later infects Aldercapt with Starscourge, transforming into the Daemon Foras before Noctis kills him. Aldercapt is voiced by Shōzō Iizuka in Japanese; in English, he is voiced by Bob Joles in Final Fantasy XV and David Gant in Kingsglaive.

=== Ravus Nox Fleuret ===
Ravus Nox Fleuret (レイヴス・ノックス・フルーレ, Reivusu Nokkusu Furūre) is Lunafreya's older brother and a former prince of Tenebrae, a formerly sovereign kingdom which Niflheim now occupies. He bears a grudge against Lucis and the Caelum dynasty for abandoning his homeland, joining the imperial army to exact revenge. During the events of Kingsglaive, Ravus attends the treaty-signing as part of Niflheim's delegation, subsequently participating in the empire's invasion of Lucis. He attempts to wield the Ring of the Lucii, but it rejects him and destroys his arm. Upon the death of General Glauca, Ravus is promoted to high commander of Niflheim's armies, with his maimed arm replaced by a Magitek prosthesis. While appearing antagonistic, it is revealed he merely deemed Noctis unworthy and resented Lunafreya worsening her health on his behalf. After Lunafreya asks him to give Noctis Regis' sword, Ravus is labeled an enemy of the empire for his failure to contain the summoning of Leviathan, leading to him defecting to Noctis's side. Ardyn then kills him and resurrects him as a partially transformed Daemon, which the party defeats. Ravus is voiced by Yūichi Nakamura in Japanese and Trevor Devall in English.

=== Verstael Besithia ===
Verstael Besithia (ヴァーサタイル・べスティア, Vāsatairu Besutia) is the head researcher of Niflheim and the "father" of Prompto. When he was younger, he was a promising scientist who developed the Magitek army from Solheim's lost technology to reduce casualties in his people's war against Lucis. More than thirty years before the game's events, Verstael uncovered the dormant Ifrit and freed Ardyn from his prison, seeing them as a means to end the war with Lucis and acquire immortality. In the main storyline, Verstael is seen persuading Emperor Aldercapt to capture Lunafreya alive, as he believes the Oracle could have potential use in her link to the Astrals. Episode: Prompto reveals that Verstael used the Starscourge and his own DNA to create Magitek soldiers, along with other Daemon weapons. Verstael reveals Prompto's origins as a clone retrieved by Lucis, goading his "son" into shooting him. Upon his death, he uploads his consciousness into his final magitek invention, Immortalis, intending to destroy the world in his new body before Prompto, with Aranea's help, destroys him. He is voiced by Jin Urayama in Japanese and Steve Blum in English. His younger version in Episode Ardyn is voiced in Japanese by Noriaki Sugiyama. (Note: Cited in credits)

=== Kingsglaive ===
The Kingsglaive (キングスグレイブ, Kingusugureibu) is an elite group dedicated to protecting Regis, who are empowered with abilities similar to those of the Lucian royal line. Following Regis's acceptance of Niflheim's peace, there is dissension among the ranks, and several betray the group. The Kingsglaive survivors are the main protagonists of Comrades, helping to defend survivors from the growing Daemon numbers and receiving forgiveness from Bahamut in return for protecting Noctis during his ten-year slumber. They join Noctis in a final assault on Insomnia during the final battle.

During early production, Ferrari created a group of similar figures to the Kingsglaive, though they were themed after ninjas. The character Umbra was supposed to be one of the group, but these plans were changed. The characters of Kingsglaive were designed to be relatable, playing into the movie's themes.

- Nyx Ulric (ニックス・ウリック, Nikkusu Urikku) is the main protagonist of Kingsglaive and a member of the titular elite guard that defends Lucis from the invading forces of Niflheim. Having lost his mother and sister in his youth when the empire conquered his hometown of Galahd, Nyx developed a fierce loyalty to Regis after he rescued him. During the events of Kingsglaive, Nyx is appointed as Lunafreya's bodyguard and eventually learns of Niflheim's plot. He subsequently sacrifices himself by using the Ring of the Lucii to enable Lunafreya's escape. Nyx is voiced by Gō Ayano in Japanese and Aaron Paul in English.
- Titus Drautos (タイタス・ドラットー, Taitasu Dorattō), also known as General Glauca (グラウカ, Gurauka), acts as both Kingsglaive's leader and the main antagonist of the film. He was originally loyal to Lucis, but after Niflheim destroyed his home town after Regis withdrew to the fortified capital, he allied with Niflheim in an act of vengeance. He is responsible for the deaths of the previous Queen of Tenebrae and Oracle Sylva Via Fleuret, as well as King Regis, and dies fighting Nyx during the destruction of Insomnia. Drautos is voiced by Kōichi Yamadera in Japanese. In English, he is voiced by Adrian Bouchet in Kingsglaive and Matthew Waterson in Final Fantasy XV.
- Libertus Ostium (リベルテス・オスティウム, Riberutesu Osutiumu) is a member of the Kingsglaive and Nyx's childhood friend, who hails from the same home town. He is among those disillusioned by King Regis's acceptance of Niflheim's offer of an armistice, defecting to the rebels when his friend Crowe is killed. However, upon witnessing the destruction Niflheim has wrought and learning of Drautos's secret identity, Libertus returns to aid Nyx, escorting Lunafreya to Insomnia's borders so she can escape. Libertus also acts as a key guide for the Kingsglaive survivors in Comrades. He is voiced by Mitsuaki Kanuka in Japanese and Liam Mulvey in English.
- Luche Lazarus (ルーチェ・ラザロ, Rūche Razaro) is considered the unofficial leader of the Kingsglaive, having gained much trust within the group. While openly loyal, Luche is the leader of dissenters among the Kingsglaive, and leads their attempt to kill Nyx and Lunafreya. When he corners and wounds Nyx, Lunafreya tricks him into wearing the Ring of the Lucii, which burns him to ashes. Luche is voiced by Tomokazu Seki in Japanese and Todd Haberkorn in English.
- Crowe Altius (クロウ・アルティウス, Kurō Arutiusu) is a powerful mage within the Kingsglaive and Libertus's friend. Having lost her family, she considers the Kingsglaive her family and shares a sibling bond with Libertus. She is sent by Regis on a mission to accompany Lunafreya, but after Luche kills her, it prompts Libertus to leave the Kingsglaive. Crowe is voiced by Ayumi Fujimura in Japanese and by Alexa Kahn in English.

=== Astrals ===
The Astrals (六神, Rokushin; lit. "Six Gods"), also called the Hexatheon, are six beings the people of Eos worship as deities, consisting of Bahamut, Shiva, Ifrit, Titan, Ramuh, and Leviathan. In ancient times, the Astral Ifrit acted as a patron of humankind, but when they rebelled against the Astrals, Ifrit flew into a destructive rage that threatened Eos. This triggered the Great War of Old, which ended after Bahamut felled Ifrit. Niflheim eventually recovered Ifrit, and it ended up corrupted and enslaved to Ardyn. In her quest to aid Noctis, Lunafreya ensures the Astrals will lend him their power by forming pacts dubbed "Covenants". In Comrades, the Astrals witness Bahamut's trial of the Kingsglaives on the island of Angelgard, the meeting place of the Astrals. Noctis's group fights a corrupted Ifrit, while the other Astrals aid in the assault on Insomnia, then unite their power with Noctis to destroy the Starscourge and Ardyn. In The Dawn of the Future, the Astrals turn against Bahamut when he threatens Eos, uniting with Noctis, Lunafreya and Ardyn to destroy him; while the Starscourge is eradicated, Bahamut's death causes magic and the other Astrals to vanish from Eos.

In the original lore of Versus XIII, inspired by the Fabula Nova Crystallis subseries, god-like beings called the fal'Cie existed separately from the summons. The summon Leviathan's design was the earliest completed for the game. During production, the mythos terminology was removed and the mythos gradually shifted to become a thematic base for original lore. As used in Final Fantasy XV, the Astrals were designed to play integral parts in the story and world as opposed to being simple monsters to be called into battle. They were intelligent beings that Noctis needed to forge a pact with rather than simply commanding them. Due to their key role in the story, the staff chose traditional Final Fantasy summons instead of creating ones unique to the game. In gameplay, four of the Astrals—Titan, Ramuh, Leviathan and Shiva—act as regular summons during the game, triggered based on the local environment and Noctis's situation.

- Shiva (シヴァ, Shiva), also known as the Glacian and the Frostbringer, is the Goddess of Ice. She is seen through most of the game as Lunafreya's human attendant Gentiana (ゲンティアナ). Despite originally being hostile towards humanity, Ifrit changed her views, though she took sides against him during the Great War of Old. Lunafreya further helped to rekindle her faith in humanity, and she willingly aids Noctis throughout his quest. When Ardyn enslaved Ifrit, Shiva woke to protect him and Niflheim's troops felled her Astral body. She later joins the other Astrals in aiding Noctis's entry to Insomnia, and deals the finishing blow to the infected Ifrit after Ardyn sets him against Noctis. In The Dawn of the Future, she directly rebels against Bahamut out of liking for Lunafreya and Noctis. Shiva is voiced by Sayaka Kinoshita in Japanese and Renee Faia in English.
- Ifrit (イフリート, Ifurīto), also known as the Infernian and the Pyreburner, is the God of Fire. He was originally a patron of humanity who granted them the gift of fire and founded the Solheim civilisation, but their betrayal caused him to become hostile. Upon awakening Ardyn corrupts him and causes him to become enthralled to the Starscourge. He is the penultimate boss of Final Fantasy XV and a boss fight in Comrades. In The Dawn of the Future, Lunafreya cleanses Ifrit of the Starscourge, and he aids Noctis in the final battle with Bahamut. Ifrit is voiced by Yasuhiro Mamiya in Japanese and John Kassir in English.
- Bahamut (バハムート, Bahamūto), also known as the Draconian and the Bladekeeper, is the God of War and leader of the Astrals. When the Starscourge ravaged Eos, he planned the events leading to the main game to permanently destroy the plague; to that end, he gifted the Crystal and the Ring of the Lucii to the Caelum dynasty and his trident to the Fleuret family. He summons Ardyn—and later, Noctis—to his domain to explain their role as sacrifices to end the Starscourge, aiding the latter in his battle against the revived and corrupted Ifrit. Bahamut takes on the role of main antagonist in Dawn of the Future, resolving to purge the planet to eradicate the Starscourge after Ardyn refuses his role. Noctis and Lunafreya ally with Ardyn and defeat Bahamut. Bahamut is voiced by Itaru Yamamoto in Japanese and David Lodge in English. Bahamut makes a cameo appearance in Assassin's Creed: Origins as part of a franchise crossover between Square Enix and Ubisoft in 2017.
- Leviathan (リヴァイアサン, Rivaiasan), also known as the Hydraean and the Tidemother, is the Goddess of the Seas. After Lunafreya awakens her from beneath the city of Altissia, she goes on a rampage after Niflheim attacks her until Lunafreya empowers Noctis and enables him to defeat her. She later aids Noctis both on his journey to Niflheim and in the final battle. Leviathan is voiced by Urara Takano in Japanese and Candi Milo in English.
- Titan (タイタン, Taitan), also known as the Archaean and the Landforger, is the God of Earth. He is located near the town of Lestallum, and is the first Astral to lend his power to Noctis. He later protects Noctis and the dying Lunafreya from Leviathan's rampage in Altissia, before joining the other Astrals in the final battle. Titan is voiced by Kenichirou Matsuda in Japanese and Ike Amadi in English.
- Ramuh (ラムウ, Ramū), also known as the Fulgurian and the Stormsender, is the God of the Storms and overseer of Eos's natural laws. Lunafreya awakened him from his slumber on Angelgard. Noctis acquires him by completing a trial in the region of Duscae, and he later appears with the other Astrals during Noctis's final battle.

== Minor characters ==
- Carbuncle (カーバンクル, Kābankuru) is one of the twenty-four Messengers, who appears in Final Fantasy XV and as a key character in Platinum Demo. Regis gifted Carbuncle to a young Noctis to guard and guide Noctis through his dreams. During Platinum Demo, Carbuncle guides the comatose Noctis through his dreams after a Daemon injures him. Carbuncle was also featured in a supplementary manga titled Episode Carbuncle.
- Cid Sophiar (シド・ソフィア, Shido Sofia) is the owner and operator of the Hammerhead garage, a gas station and repair shop in the Leide region. When he was younger, Cid fought alongside Regis and Cor against the forces of Niflheim. Cid supports the repentant Kingsglaive during the events of Comrades. Hammerhead is later converted into a safe haven for the survivors of the collapse of civilization throughout Eos. Cid is voiced by Nobuyuki Katsube in Japanese and Jack Angel in English.
- Cindy Aurum (シドニー・オールム, Shidonī Ōrumu) serves as the mechanic for the Regalia at the Hammerhead garage and offers customization options for it. Like her grandfather, her original English name "Cidney" is part of a long-running tradition in the Final Fantasy series of characters named "Cid" who have an affinity for mechanical objects and technology. Cindy is the first instance of a female incarnation of "Cid" in the series. She has appeared or is otherwise referenced in other video games outside of the Final Fantasy franchise, such as Minecraft and Blue Reflection. Cindy is voiced by Yū Shimamura in Japanese and Erin Matthews in English.
- Loqi Tummelt (ロキ・タメルト, Roki Tameruto) and Caligo Ulldor (カリゴ・ウルドー, Karigo Urudō) are minor antagonists, who serve as Brigadier Generals in Niflheim's army. Loqi has a long-standing antagonism with Cor, and both pursue Noctis and threaten his allies. Ravus later kills Caligo in the aftermath of Leviathan's rampage. In The Dawn of the Future, Loqi sacrifices himself to defend fleeing citizens from Daemons. Loqi is voiced by Takashi Ohara in Japanese and Jason Spisak in English, while Caligo is voiced by Itaru Yamamoto in Japanese and Rick Zieff in English.
- Umbra (アンブラ, Anbura) and Pryna (プライナ, Puraina) are two dogs who act as companions and messengers for Noctis and Lunafreya. They are two of the twenty-four Messengers, beings who serve as intermediaries between humanity and the Astrals. Prompto helped an injured Pryna in his youth, indirectly leading to his friendship with Noctis. Pryna dies along with Lunafreya in Altissia, but she manifests for Prompto to guide him during the events of Episode Prompto. Umbra continues to watch over Noctis, giving him a message after he awakens from his ten-year slumber in the Crystal and appearing in Insomnia following his final battle.
- Talcott Hester (タルコット・ハスタ, Tarukotto Hasuta) is the grandson of Jared Hester (タルコット・ハスタ, Jareddo Hasuta), the chamberlain of the Amicitia family. Following the fall of Imsomnia, they flee to Lestallum along with Iris. Jared is later murdered after Talcott inadvertently reveals their identities to Niflheim agents, which traumatizes him. Ten years later, an older Talcott encounters Noctis after his awakening on Angelgard, and drives him to Hammerhead to meet the other survivors of a post-apocalyptic Eos. Talcott is voiced in Japanese by Ayumu Murase as an adult and by Tomoyo Kurosawa as a child, and in English by Josh Keaton as an adult and Kyle Arem as a child. Jared is voiced by Hiroshi Iwasaki in Japanese and Tony Amendola in English.
- Camelia Claustra (カメリア・クラウストラ, Kameria Kurausutora) is the first secretary of the Accordo Protectorate, a vassal state of Niflheim. She is a friend of Regis' former steward Weskham, who arranges a diplomatic summit between her and Noctis in Accordo's capital city, Altissia, to discuss the summoning of Leviathan and its potential consequences for the city. She is voiced by Jun Karasawa in Japanese and Judith Flanagan in English.
- Gilgamesh (ギルガメッシュ, Girugamesshu) is a central character in Episode Gladiolus and a version of a recurring Final Fantasy character. In ancient times, he served as Somnus's Shield. He became an immortal being, challenging Lucian warriors in battle. He tests Gladiolus's worth, and grants him his favour and the weapon he took from Cor during their bout years ago. He is voiced by Kazuhiko Inoue in Japanese and Tom Taylorson in English.
- Somnus Lucis Caelum (ソムヌス・ルシス・チェラム, Somunusu Rushisu Cheramu), who is also known as the Founder King and the Mystic, is Noctis's ancestor and Ardyn's younger brother. Somnus took a martial approach to quelling the Starscourge, subsequently taking Ardyn's place as the chosen king and accidentally killing Aera, expunging Ardyn's existence from history. He becomes one of the Lucii, and acts as the final boss of Episode Ardyn. In both Final Fantasy XV and The Dawn of the Future, Somnus's Lucii form aids in destroying the Starscourge. Somnus is voiced by Daisuke Namikawa in Japanese and Zach Villa in English.
- Aera Mirus Fleuret (エイラ・ミルス・フルーレ, Eira Mirusu Furūre) is Lunafreya's ancestor, the first Oracle, and Ardyn's fiancée. After Aera revealed to Somnus the identity of the chosen king, she was used to lure Ardyn into Somnus's trap and died in the ensuing fight between the brothers. Her death would play a vital role in Ardyn's vendetta against Somnus's bloodline. In Dawn of the Future, Aera asks Lunafreya to save Ardyn then meets him in the afterlife after Bahamut's defeat. Aera is voiced by Saori Seto in Japanese and Julie Nathanson in English.
- Solara Aldercapt Antiquum (ソラーラ・エルダーキャプト・アンテイクム, Sorāra Erudākyaputo Anteikumu), also known as Sol, appears in The Dawn of the Future. She is the secret grandchild of Iedolas Aldercapt, with Aranea and Loqi rescuing her from Nilfheim's capital Gralea as it falls to the Starscourge. Over the next ten years later, she becomes an experienced Daemon hunter, helping the revived Lunafreya and ultimately aiding in the final battle.
- Sarah (サラ, Sara) and Y'jhimei (ヤ・ジメイ, Ya Jimei) appear as guest companions in crossover collaboration content with Terra Wars and Final Fantasy XIV respectively. Sarah teams up with Noctis after they find themselves stranded in a realm populated by small white beings known as the Hiso Aliens. Y'jhimei supports Noctis' party after they accept her request to investigate an attempt by cultists to summon Garuda, a powerful being from the setting of Final Fantasy XIV.

== Reception ==
Six characters from Final Fantasy XV ranked in the Top 75 of NHK's "All-Final Fantasy Grand Poll of Japanese players" in 2020, which tallied over 468,000 votes; Noctis, Ignis, Prompto, Ardyn, Lunafreya and Aranea placed #13, #28, #38, #63, #69, and #75 respectively. Game Informer, in its "RPG of the Year" awards, awarded the "Best Cast" category to the leads of Final Fantasy XV and best sidekick to Ignis. In an article for ComicsVerse, Peter Swann noted that Final Fantasy XV's all-male cast helped challenge gender roles, focusing on Ignis's behavior during rest periods and the non-prejudice representation of Prompto's early obesity. Salvatore Pane, writing for Paste Magazine, called Final Fantasy XV a "tender depiction of teenage boy and their complex relationships with each other and with death", much more than its science fantasy tropes, giving praise to each character due to their mutually-reinforcing dynamic. He also praised the central cast's characterization of its four principal characters as "one of the first truly human experiences" in the video game genre, and suggested that its storytelling of the characters' struggle against injustice and malevolence to be an example of video games as an art form in its "cathartic and transformative" aspirations. An article by the Perkins School for the Blind lauded the representation of Ignis's recovery from his blinding, citing it as a positive example of acclimatising to disability.

Chris Carter of Destructoid enjoyed the playable cast, and felt other characters' presence within the narrative despite a lack of development. Electronic Gaming Monthly's Mollie L. Patterson cited the four lead characters as "the glue that keeps everything together even in the game's worst periods", saying that they went beyond their stereotypes due to the amount of time spent with them. Game Informer's Andrew Reiner praised the portrayal of Noctis's burdens, and enjoyed the characters and the portrayal of their hobbies and interests. Game Revolution's Jonathan Leack felt the characters lacked development during the early sections of the game. Peter Brown of GameSpot enjoyed the grounded portrayal of the playable cast, but faulted the minimal representation of supporting characters despite portrayals in additional media. IGN's Vince Ingenito said the relationships within Noctis's party gave the game its only heart, as he felt its supporting cast was underused and its romantic elements poorly written. Philip Kollar of Polygon called Noctis's companions the game's "beating heart". Hardcore Gamer's Adam Beck, while negative on the storyline and treatment of supporting characters, said the main cast "serve strong character building and chemistry".

Reviewing Kingsglaive, Meghan Sullivan of IGN said the voicework helped make the lead cast believable, but faulted its handling of the secondary characters. In his review of Kingsglaive, Andrew Barker of Variety felt the "throwaway characters" were one of its biggest flaws. Polygon's Ashley Oh felt there was a lack of character development compared to other Final Fantasy narratives. GamesRadar was more positive, praising its cast as relatable. Carter found the anime Brotherhood helped him become interested in the game's lead cast. GamesRadar called the anime "surprisingly well-written", praising its more intimate narrative compared to Kingsglaive. In a feature following the release of the anime's third episode, Michelle Nguyen of Geek.com praised the camaraderie between the leads and how the anime fleshed out Prompto's character. Jenni Lada, writing for Siliconera, felt that the additional backstory and interactions shown in Brotherhood helped the main game's narrative work.

Writing about Episode Gladiolus, Andrew Webster of The Verge found Gladiolus's character development lacking in the absence of his companions. RPGFan's Peter Triezenberg enjoyed the interactions between Gladiolus and Cor. Reviews of Episode Prompto generally praised the title character's portrayal and storyline despite some clichéd or clashing elements. Carter called Episode Ignis the best DLC episode to that point, praising its relation to the main narrative as well as Ignis's portrayal. Triezenberg enjoyed the narrative, and felt the alternate storyline featured in Episode Ignis provided some good character development for Ignis, Noctis and Ardyn. Mike Fahey from Kotaku praised Ardyn's portrayal as the setting's overarching antagonist, citing Episode Ardyn and its anime tie-in as highlights for his character development and making his vendetta against Noctis's family "fully justified". RPG Site's George Foster was very positive, saying the DLC "manages to turn a previously interesting, but oftentimes one-note villain, into a sympathetic figure". Hirun Cryer from USGamer was less positive, faulting Ardyn's overarching characterisation and saying Episode Ardyn's narrative undermined the work done during the anime tie-in.

Critics were divided over the representation of female characters across all relevant media. Many expressed disappointment at the disproportionate lack of female characters, as well as the portrayal of the few who are present in the narrative like Lunafreya and Cindy. Conversely, Aranea and Camelia are regarded as empowering or respectable female characters. Heather Alexandra from Kotaku praised Aranea's boss fight as a memorable encounter which provides a strong introduction to a great character. Critics particularly liked Aranea's interactions with Prompto in Episode Prompto. Swann took the view that the good character writing in Brotherhood helped balance out any problems with female representation in the game.
