= Cindy Aurum =

Fictional character (Final Fantasy XV)

- Final Fantasy character
- Cindy Aurum from Final Fantasy XV
- First game: Final Fantasy XV (2016)
- Created by: Roberto Ferari
- Designed by: Roberto Ferari; Yusaku Nakaaki
- Voiced by: EN: Erin Matthews; JA: Yū Shimamura
- Motion capture: Haruka Shibai

Cindy Aurum, known in Japan as Cidney Aurum (Japanese: シドニー・オールム, Hepburn: Shidonī Ōrumu), is a character in the video game Final Fantasy XV. Created by illustrator Roberto Ferrari, she is a mechanic that helps repair and upgrade the protagonist's car. She fills the role as the game's "Cid", a recurring character archetype within the Final Fantasy series that often has an affinity for machinery, and is the first female iteration of such. Since her debut, she has appeared in other games related to both XV and the franchise as a whole. She is voiced by Erin Matthews in English and Yū Shimamura in Japanese, and her motion capture was done by Haruka Shibai.

Since her introduction she received mixed reception, with early player reactions and media outlets feeling she was too sexualized, the latter repeating such sentiments after the game's release. Other outlets saw her as an example of XV's shortcomings, while others felt she soured the game's experience as a whole. However, she has also been a popular subject of cosplay and fan response, while other outlets praised her role in the game and considered her a breath of fresh air to the standard Japanese roleplaying game experience.

== Concept and creation ==
Her skin color was lightened in the final game, while her shorts were lengthened.

Created for Final Fantasy XV, Cindy, called Cidney in the original Japanese release, is a female mechanic created and designed by Italian artist Roberto Ferrari. Ferrari, who completed her design in 2010 when the game was called Versus XIII under Tetsuya Nomura, drew three poses for the character before leaving the development team due to a disagreement. According to Ferrari he designed all aspects of the character, down to her makeup and accessories. Some aspects of her appearance where inspired by his wife, Franca. In his designs her skin color was much darker, meant to resemble that of musician Beyoncé, but in the final game it was changed to a paler tone. Cindy is meant to fill the same role as recurring character concept "Cid" in the series, a recurring character archetype that is often associated with machinery and mechanical knowledge, and is recognized as the first female iteration of such.

Standing 165 centimetres (5 ft 5 in) tall, Cindy is a white blonde woman with short blonde messy hair that frames her face. Her outfit consists of a yellow cropped jacket that exposes her midriff while partially unzipped to reveal a pink bra, blue daisy duke shorts, black leather stockings that go midway up her thighs, and white tall cowboy boots over them on her feet. Her accessories include a trucker hat with her car garage's logo on the front, black gloves, goggles around her neck, and an angled utility belt with a large pouch on each hip. When the project later became Final Fantasy XV under Hajime Tabata, Cindy's development was overseen by Yusaku Nakaaki. During an interview with Famitsu, when the interviewer commented about her cleavage, Tabata responded that the development team was "enthusiastic" regarding her, and early on her breasts were "shaking violently".

In April 2015, the development team discussed feedback they had received from the game's demo, amongst which was a complaint from European players that Cindy was "too sexy". After Tabata responded that she was not intended to be an "erotic character" and she was instead a "very energetic and outgoing, a very active character". He added that coupled with her appearance, the team felt that she would not be seen as problematic. When the game's marketing manager Akio Ofuji pointed out to Tabata that feedback seemed particularly focused on her outfit in relation to her role as a mechanic, he responded they did not want to change her character concept, and questioned if it was about "moderating the way she’s presented" due to perceived "overly sexual themes are being brought to the forefront, because that’s not who she’s supposed to be." Nakaaki agreed, stating that the male members of the development team "did their best to create her", with Tabata stating their "heart and soul" went into the work, though affirmed that if they felt it was too excessive they would modify it to ensure players were comfortable while playing in their living rooms.

== Appearances ==
As introduced in the 2016 roleplaying video game Final Fantasy XV, Cindy Aurum is a minor character, and with her grandfather, Cid, runs the Hammerhead Service Station, where she will repair and offer upgrades for the protagonist's car, the Regalia. Prior to the game's events, when she was a young child, she witnessed her parents being attacked and killed by daemons, monsters in the game's universe. Cindy also appears in the multiplayer expansion Final Fantasy XV: Comrades. She is voiced in all appearances in Japanese by Yū Shimamura, while in English she is voiced by Erin Matthews, who portrayed the character with a thick Southern accent. Meanwhile, her motion capture was performed by Haruka Shibai.

She later appeared as a playable character in Final Fantasy XV: A New Empire and its sequel Final Fantasy XV: War for Eos, mobile game spinoff titles. Outside of the Final Fantasy XV series she appears as a playable unit in Final Fantasy Brave Exvius, and on cards for the Final Fantasy trading card game.

== Promotion and reception ==
Despite being a minor character, Cindy has been heavily promoted. She was first unveiled in the "Episode Duscae" demo for Final Fantasy XV, and later at CEDEC 2016 she was showcased as part of a presentation discussing how the development team created the character models and textures for Final Fantasy XV. A cosplay reference guide illustrating the individual parts of her model was also released. In 2017, Play Arts produced a poseable 11 inch tall figurine of Cindy. Meanwhile, her outfit is available as in-game clothing to customize player characters of Minecraft, the character Kaori in Blue Reflection, and the character Nono in #Compass.

Since her initial reveal in the game's demo, her outfit and portrayal has the subject of heated debate, with sources such as GameRevolution comparing her to fellow controversial character Quiet from Metal Gear Solid V, and The Guardian calling her "laughable male fantasy" while further expressing disdain for her attire and how she posed while maintenancing the protagonists' vehicle. Chris Kohler in an article for Wired meanwhile argued that simply deleting the character would be an improvement for the game after playing the demo. Jon Bailes of GamesRadar+ on the other hand felt that Cindy set "the tone for a game of mismatches" down to the plain nature of her name compared to the playable cast. To him, while protagonist felt polished, characters like Cindy represented the rougher edges of a game he felt went through a troubled development.

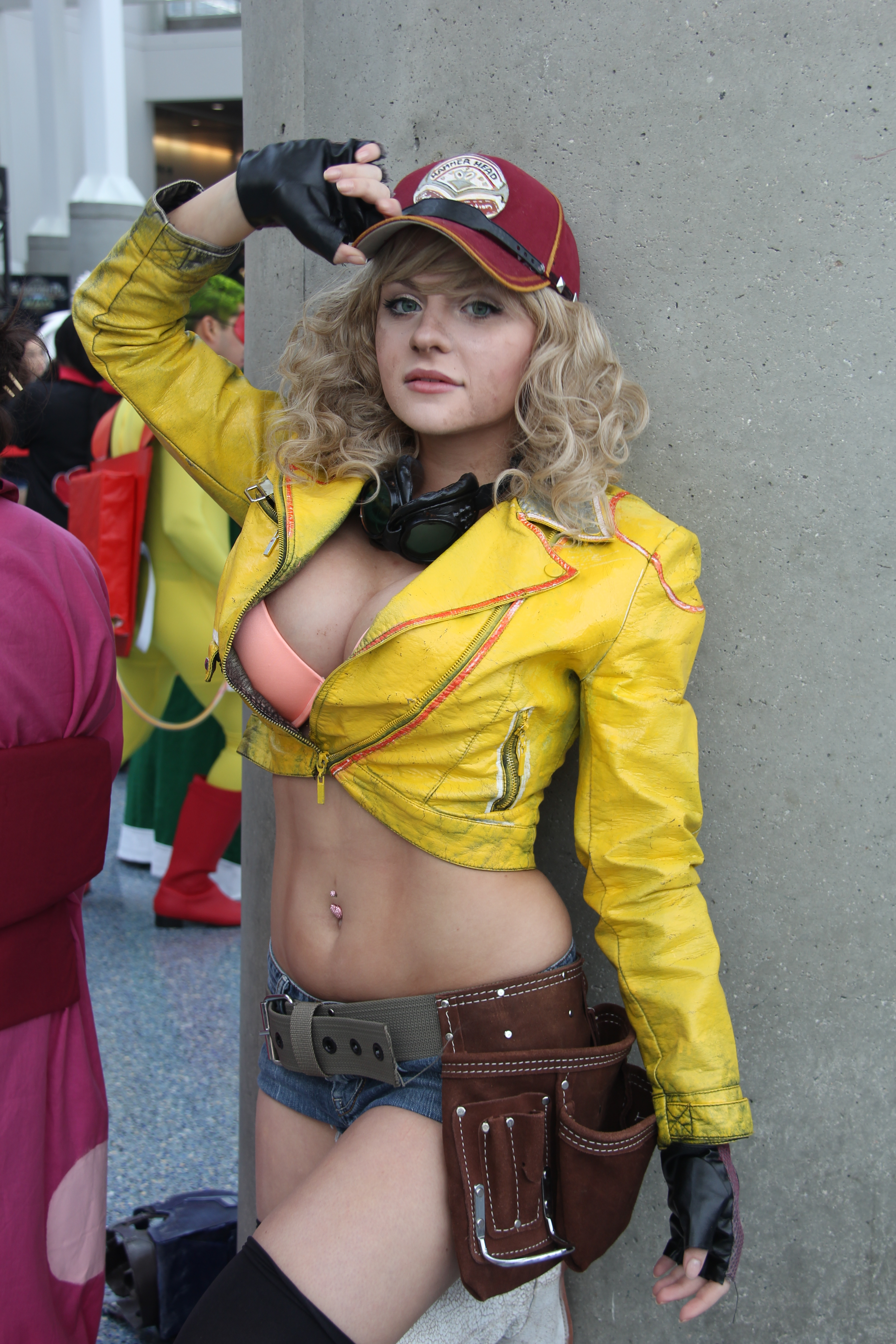
Though Cindy's design sparked controversy, she has also been noted as a popular subject of cosplay

The writers of Vice were particularly critical of her character. While Mike Diver had originally shared his wife's reaction to her design, stating "if the weather's good, and the work is messy, why wear too many clothes?" He later stated he felt she was the game's "biggest negative" further describing her as "a single loose thread away from indignity" and "totally out of whack" with the rest of the game. Patrick Klepek agreed, feeling that her design made him want to be aware of who in particular was watching him play the title. He felt that Cindy as a character wasn't the problem, and if she had some expressed reason for her appearance, he'd have less of an issue. Austin Walker meanwhile argued that while Cindy was a problem for him, she felt to him more like a symptom of how poorly gender was handled in the game overall.

Jérémie Kermarrec in the book La Légende Final Fantasy XV described her as one of the most sexualized characters in the franchise as a whole, and felt she represented a negative trope of "women as background decoration" in gaming. Acknowledging that other elements of sexualization were present amongst the male cast as well, he emphasized by comparison such was never done to "titillate" the viewer in their case as it was in Cindy's. While her role in the game was serious and her dialogue was never meant to paint her "as a bimbo supposed to tempt the main characters", he felt this only further illustrated the absurdity of her design, the disconnect between her character and appearance emphasizing that her visual design was created solely for seductive purposes. He closed with feeling that the development team's reaction to backlash regarding Cindy felt "straight out of another era" in the current climate of gaming at that time, when proper representation of women in gaming was a more widely discussed topic. At the same time, he added it was also important the recognize the role gender disparity in Japan had on such sentiments, and lamented the missed opportunity for the development team to demonstrate goodwill by acknowledging such issues.

However, not all reactions were entirely negative. Nadia Oxford of USGamer felt that while her outfit and window-washing cutscene was "obvious fanservice" and particularly inappropriate for the weather she was in, it was inoffensive to her due to the game not being centered around "male wish fulfillment". Inverse's Jessica Famularo felt that the character deserved more in the game's story than just fanservice, noting that while sexualized characters were not uncommon to the franchise, they often had their own agency and stories. Brittany Vincent of Shacknews on the other hand called her one of her favorite characters in the game and the title's "best girl". Describing Cindy as "a rugged, no-nonsense mechanic who's a cool drink of water for thirsty eyes and minds tired of the typical JRPG female character archetype", she emphasized that the character's presence was one aspect that gave Final Fantasy XV a more "Western" roleplaying game feel and set it apart from other entries in the Final Fantasy series.

Peter Swann of ComicsVerse praised Cindy in an examination of how Final Fantasy XV challenged gender roles and called her the most important female character in the title. He explained that by filling a role in a field often dominated by men, she was a "badass woman" who enabled the male party members' whole journey, who due to their own ineptitude in the field of car repair and mechanics "would have been captured, or killed, ages ago" without her. While he acknowledged that the character was dressed in revealing attire, he argued that it was no different than the character Gladiolus, and felt that if people could enjoy him being "practically shirtless while fighting monsters, we can suspend disbelief over a scantily clad mechanic for other gamers to enjoy." He went further to express his belief that game developers were often more open-minded in design options but were bound to their demographics, citing an example of a male character in revealing attire that went through similar backlash.

Game Rant's Ben Grindle meanwhile compared her to previous "Cid" characters, and shared much of Swann's sentiments in that she was significantly more important to the title due to the role she played for the protagonists, while also helping to modernize the concept. While often the characters were portrayed as older gruff men who tended to have military backgrounds, often also estranged from their families, Cindy's lack of these aspects along with her close relationship to her grandfather gave her in Grindle's eyes a warming presence. He felt this "radical departure" of her personality in comparison to her predecessors was a breath of fresh air that helped modernize the character's concept, while retaining the familiar aspects players had come to expect from the archetype. Additionally he emphasized while the character was never playable, her role in the game as a source of side quests and helping to maintain the party's means of transportation gave her presence, and all combined to help push "the character’s portrayal into new areas" and provided her "a sense of fulfillment to this Cid’s story and role that’s unlike most that have come before her."

Fan response to the character also differed from the media reaction. The feedback in player polls criticizing Cindy as "too sexy" incited backlash from certain quarters of the Final Fantasy fandom, who went on social media to defend the presentation of female characters like Cindy in the video game industry. Cindy has also been the subject of frequent cosplay, with Tabata noting in an interview in Vice that she appeared to be the fan favorite from the title due to seeing someone dressed as her at every event prior to the game's release. Kean Sullivan of Game Rant observed that of all the female characters in XV Cindy was the most common to see cosplayed, attributing it in part due to her frequent presence in the title by also "how memorable her character design is". Kermarrec also acknowledged the character's popularity in cosplay, feeling that she benefited not only from the low number of female characters in the game but also her expressive design with "very identifiable and easy-to-reproduce elements" despite his previous criticism.
