= Final Fantasy XV: The Dawn of the Future =

2019 novel by Emi Nagashima

- Cover artwork featuring leads Noctis Lucis Caelum and Lunafreya Nox Fleuret.
- Author: Emi Nagashima
- Original title: 小説 FINAL FANTASY XV -The Dawn Of The Future-
- Translator: Stephen Kohler
- Language: Japanese
- Series: Final Fantasy
- Genre: Fantasy
- Publisher: Square Enix
- Publication date: April 25, 2019
- Publication place: Japan
- English publication date: June 23, 2020 (Square Enix)
- Media type: Print (ebook and hardcover)
- Pages: 408
- ISBN: 1-6460-9000-4

Final Fantasy XV: The Dawn of the Future is a fantasy novel, written by Emi Nagashima (as Jun Eishima) and published by Square Enix. It is based on the universe and characters of Final Fantasy XV, an entry in the company's long-running Final Fantasy franchise. It was first released in Japan in April 2019, before being released worldwide in June 2020 as one of the debut titles in the company's newly formed Western publishing house.

The story follows four characters from the game; main protagonist Noctis Lucis Caelum, lead heroine Lunafreya Nox Fleuret, supporting character Aranea Highwind, and main antagonist Ardyn Izunia. The four experience a series of events which alter their destinies and bring them into conflict with Bahamut, leader of the world's deities. The Dawn of the Future was intended as an alternate finale to and definitive ending of Final Fantasy XV and its additional media.

The novel's narrative was originally planned as episodic downloadable content for Final Fantasy XV in 2019, but only the first episode was completed due to the departure of project leader Hajime Tabata. The team wanted to release the planned narrative, so opted to have Nagashima turn their draft storyline into a novel. Both the staff and Nagashima, who had written novels for both Final Fantasy and Nier: Automata, were skeptical about the project. In Japan, the novel saw higher-than-expected sales. Western reviews were mixed; several praised the character portrayals, but its theme of defying fate saw negative reactions when compared to the game's themes of sacrifice.

== Background ==
The Dawn of the Future began as downloadable content (DLC) for the 2016 role-playing video game Final Fantasy XV. The parts were provisionally titled Episode Ardyn, Gaiden Episode Aranea, Episode Lunafreya and Episode Noctis. Following the success of the original wave of DLC in 2017, developer Square Enix greenlit The Dawn of the Future to provide closure to the game's story and characters. The Dawn of the Future was to expand upon the base narrative and offer a new scenario where key characters defy their predetermined fates to create an ideal future. Development was handled by internal studio Luminous Productions, which had taken over production of post-release content in 2018.

The DLC's main theme was "grand finale", with the aim being to provide a happy ending for the characters. The dark tone and exposition of Episode Ardyn was intended to contrast with the lighter tone of Episode Aranea and the last two episodes. The scenario draft, written by the DLC's narrative director Toru Osanai, was completed by March 2018. Each episode was being handled by different writers. Episode Ardyn and Episode Aranea were being written by Koichiro Ito who had worked on the playable teaser P.T., while Episode Luna was being co-written by Osanai, Tomoyoshi Nagai and Yuichiro Takeda. Takeda, known for his work on the Xenoblade series, was also writing the scenario for Episode Noctis. Some of the narrative reused concepts that had to be cut from early brainstorming sessions for Final Fantasy XV.

During this period, the game's original director and later producer Hajime Tabata was losing interest in the project and wanted to go on "his own path" without inconveniencing anyone. After internal discussions, Tabata decided to leave Square Enix and form his own studio. The company parted with Tabata on good terms, but the decision was made to cancel the second series of DLC and end post-release support for the game. At the time of cancellation, Episode Ardyn was almost complete, and the other episodes were at various stages of completion or drafting. After internal discussions about what to tell the public, they finally announced that the remaining episodes were cancelled. Episode Ardyn was released in March 2019.

Despite the cancellation, Square Enix looked into alternative ways of releasing their planned story. The unfinished content was turned into a novel, written for long-term fans of the game to provide closure for the project and its universe. Square Enix hired Emi Nagashima, who had previously written supplementary materials for Final Fantasy XIII and Nier: Automata. Writing under the pen name Jun Eishima, Nagashima based the novel on materials from the Final Fantasy XV development team, including Osanai's story draft. There were mixed feelings from staff about turning the DLC into a novel, including from Nagashima herself. Osanai was worried that the narrative would be destroyed by the format change, but he felt Nagashima succeeded in turning the DLC narrative into an effective novel. The novel adapts Episode Ardyn and follows the scenario where Ardyn rejects his fate in order to deliver a new ending to the fans.

== Plot ==
=== Setting ===
Final Fantasy XV: The Dawn of the Future is set on the Earth-like world of Eos, where humans are overseen by a divine race called the Astrals. A formative event is the Great War of Old, a conflict between the Astrals triggered when humanity attacked them and sent the Astral Ifrit into a destructive rage. The present world is split between the Niflheim empire and the free kingdom of Lucis, who fight for control of Lucis's magical Crystal. Additionally, an ancient plague called the Starscourge re-emerges, turning native life into monsters called Daemons and lengthening the nights. The Oracle, a human gifted with the power to commune with the Astrals, acts as a healer holding the Starscourge at bay. According to prophecy, a figure called the True King will cleanse Eos of the Starscourge at the cost of his life.

The novel follows four characters during events leading off from Final Fantasy XV and its DLC. Noctis Lucis Caelum is heir to the throne of Lucis and the prophesied True King. Lunafreya Nox Fleuret is the current Oracle and Noctis's fiancée in a political marriage. Aranea Highwind is a dragoon mercenary working for Niflheim who turns into an ally of Noctis's. Ardyn Izunia—also called Ardyn Lucis Caelum—is the Chancellor of Niflheim and the game's main antagonist.

=== Story ===
A Savior Lost

Ardyn Lucis Caelum begins as a Crystal-chosen healer who can cure the Starscourge by absorbing it into his body; his attitude and disagreement with the militaristic stance of his brother Somnus causes friction between them. This escalates into Somnus staging a coup, with Ardyn's lover Aera Mirus Fleuret being killed. Ardyn is rejected by the Crystal due to the Starscourge in his body; a piece of his soul becomes trapped in the Crystal, making him immortal. Imprisoned by Somnus on the island of Angelgard, Ardyn suffers through two millennia of delusions before Verstael Bethesia of Niflheim retrieves him. At Verstael's urging, Ardyn embraces his powers and enslaves Ifrit. Ardyn gradually loses his sanity by absorbing the memories of his victims, becoming Niflheim's chancellor and adopting the surname "Izunia". Bahamut halts Ardyn's attempted attack on Lucis's capital Insomnia, revealing Ardyn's purpose as a sacrifice for the True King to purge the Starscourge. Ardyn resists, and after being tortured and returned to Angelgard by Bahamut, he vows to destroy both Noctis and the Astrals. The chapter ends before the intended final battle, where Ardyn waits for Noctis, but is confronted by Lunafreya.

The Beginning of the End

Aranea returns to Gralea from a mission, lamenting Niflheim's growing militarism. Aranea finds the Niflheim capital Gralea under attack from military Daemon troops, with Ardyn announcing the empire's downfall. Aranea finds Emperor Aldercapt dead. She attempts to fight Ardyn, then helps with evacuating Gralea's civilian population. Before escaping, Niflheim soldier Loqi Tummelt asks her to escort a young girl to safety. Loqi sacrifices himself to ensure their escape, and Aranea's unit defeats a pursuing large-scale Daemon weapon. Following their escape, she learns the girl is Solara Aldercapt Antiquum, Aldercapt's secret granddaughter. Ten years later, when Eos is covered in the Starscourge's permanent night, Solara has grown into a rebellious and capable Daemon hunter.

Choosing Freedom

Lunafreya, having sacrificed herself to further Noctis's journey, is revived by Bahamut on the Niflheim continent. Running from Daemons, she meets and befriends Solara. As they travel to humanity's last stronghold in Lestallum, Lunafreya learns of her new ability to absorb the Starscourge, though it gradually changes her body. During their journey, Solara's criticism of the Astrals makes Lunafreya question her mission. In conversation, Lunafreya reveals a conflict-weary Bahamut tried to destroy Eos in the Great War of Old before the other Astrals stopped him. In Lunafreya's dreams, the Astral Shiva attempts to warn her of Bahamut's motives. Returning to the Lucis continent, Lunafreya helps Solara rescue Aranea from an underground tomb, absorbing the Starscourge infecting Aranea. This completes Lunafreya's change into a Daemonic form, but Solara stops her being killed and she is transported to Lestallum. In a dream, Shiva reveals that Bahamut intends to fulfil his plan of purging Eos following Ardyn's defiance, using Lunafreya to gather darkness to empower his attack. Lunafreya escapes with help from Solara and Aranea, intent on convincing Ardyn to help stop Bahamut.

The Final Glaive

During his ten-year slumber in the Crystal to become the True King, Noctis relives the memories stored there, including those of Ardyn. Upon emerging, Noctis is met by Solara who reveals Lunafreya's plan. At the citadel, Ardyn rejects Lunafreya's plan and sets Ifrit on her. Lunafreya absorbs the Starscourge from Ifrit and gains his allegiance, but doing this overwhelms her. When Noctis arrives, the corrupted Lunafreya fights him, then Bahamut begins absorbing her power to charge his attack. Noctis convinces Ardyn to perform the True King's ritual in his place. With the aid of his allies Noctis frees Lunafreya and unites with the other Astrals to block most of Bahamut's attack. Noctis kills Bahamut's physical form, while Ardyn performs the True King's ritual and destroys Bahamut's spirit before fading away. Bahamut's death causes magic and the Astrals to fade; the Crystal absorbs the Starscourge and shatters, and Shiva heals Lunafreya before vanishing. The story ends with the world recovering, and Noctis and Lunafreya marrying.

== Publication ==
The novel was released in Japan on April 25, 2019. It was published both as a standalone book, and as part of a "Celebration Box" which included an artbook, a postcard set, a themed coaster, and a Blu-ray copy of Episode Ardyn Prologue, an original video animation detailing Ardyn's past. Upon release, Square Enix ran out of inventory due to popular demand, prompting both an apology and rapid restocks. Work on an English translation was confirmed in early 2019. The English translation was done by Stephen Kohler. It includes fifty pieces of artwork, including illustrations and concept art. The novel's planned date for English version was June 23, 2020 through Square Enix Books & Manga, a publishing imprint of Square Enix created in partnership with Penguin Random House. Due to disruptions caused by the COVID-19 pandemic, the physical release was delayed to July 14, while the digital version was released on the original date.

== Reception ==
James Beckett of Anime News Network was critical of how the fight scenes and resolution were written, but still lauded the narratives of Lunafreya and Noctis as superior to the game. Anime UK praised the character writing, particularly Ardyn and Aranea, but faulted its alternate take on events which continued to leave gaps in the original game's narrative. RPGFan's Peter Triezenberg enjoyed seeing Noctis's perspective, and praised Aranea's personality, but found Ardyn and Lunafreya's chapters lacking; Lunafreya in particular was criticised due to her inconsistent portrayal in both the book and the Final Fantasy XV universe as a whole. Alex Fuller of RPGamer felt it could be enjoyable for Final Fantasy fans, but noted a lack of explanation for newcomers, and faulted the second half's premise relying on "a complete, clumsily justified ret-con". Both Anime UK and Triezenberg faulted a shift from the game's theme of sacrifice to that of defying fate borrowed from the Fabula Nova Crystallis Final Fantasy subseries.
