= Darin De Paul =

American voice actor

- Occupation: Voice actor
- Years active: 1989–present

Darin De Paul is an American voice actor known for his video game performances as Dr. Samuel Hayden / Seraphim in Doom and Doom Eternal, Reinhardt in Overwatch and Overwatch 2, Ardyn Izunia in Final Fantasy XV, Revenant in Apex Legends, Emperor Valkorion in Star Wars: The Old Republic, and J. Jonah Jameson in the Marvel's Spider-Man series.

== Filmography ==
=== Film ===
List of voice performances in films
Year	Series	Role	Notes	Source
2002	Ice Age	Additional voices	Uncredited	
2005	Robots	Additional voices		
2016	Warcraft	Additional voices	Uncredited	
2016	Kingsglaive: Final Fantasy XV	Ardyn Izunia	English dub	
2017	Resident Evil: Vendetta	Zombie	English dub	
2017	Top Cat Begins	Mr. Big		
2019	Shazam!	Greed, Pride		
2019	DC Showcase: Death	Professor	Short film	
2020	Mortal Kombat Legends: Scorpion's Revenge	Quan Chi		
2021	Justice Society: World War II	Brainiac		
2022	Batman and Superman: Battle of the Super Sons	Lex Luthor, Starro		
2023	Legion of Super-Heroes	Brainiac, Solomon Grundy		
2023	Batman: The Doom That Came to Gotham	Thomas Wayne		
2024	Justice League: Crisis on Infinite Earths – Part Two	Solovar		
2024	Big City Greens the Movie: Spacecation	Narrator, Additional voices		
2025	The Witcher: Sirens of the Deep	Captain		

=== Animation ===
List of voice performances in animation
Year	Series	Role	Notes	Source
2014	Judge Dredd: Superfiend	Judge Dredd	Web series	
2015–19	The Stinky & Dirty Show	Chip, Rover		
2016, 2019	We Bare Bears	Yuri, additional voices		
2017	Justice League Action	Sinestro	Episode: "The Ringer"	
2018	The Adventures of Puss in Boots	Scarlet Panther	Episode: "Lost and Foundlings"	
2018–present	Baki	Ryu Kaioh	English dub	
2018–19	3Below: Tales of Arcadia	Zeron Alpha	11 episodes	
2019	Cannon Busters	Moldwarp, additional voices	English dub	
2019–21	Amphibia	Bog	2 episodes	
2020	Wizards: Tales of Arcadia	Bular	3 episodes	
2020–present	Big City Greens	Good Ol' Joe	4 episodes	
2022	The Legend of Vox Machina	Kerrion Stonefell	3 episodes	
2022	Primal	Vikings A, B, and D	Episode: "The Red Mist"	
2024	Rock Paper Scissors	The Hipponoid Commander	3 episodes	
2024	What If...?	Zeus, Executioner	4 episodes	
2024	Secret Level	Bartender	Episode: "Concord: Tale of the Implacable"	
2025	The Mighty Nein	Carnival Announcer, Orc at Carnival	Episode: "The Fletching & Moondrop Traveling Carnival of Curiosities"	
2026	X-Men '97	Sabretooth, Omega Red	Episode: "Weapon X, Lies, and DVDs"	

=== Video games ===
List of voice performances in video games
Year	Series	Role	Notes	Source
2011	Star Wars: The Old Republic	Valkorion, General Daeruun		
2012	Skylanders: Giants	Gill Grunt, Gill Runt		
2013	Skylanders: Swap Force	Gill Grunt, Gill Runt		
2014	Hearthstone	Grobbulus, Death Knight, Instructor Razuvious, Trade Prince Gallywix		
2014	Skylanders: Trap Team	Gill Grunt, Gill Runt, Chef Pepper Jack		
2014	World of Warcraft: Warlords of Draenor	Blackhand, Socrethar		
2015	Heroes of the Storm	Anub'arak		
2015	Star Wars Battlefront	Weequay		
2015	Warhammer 40,000: Regicide	Ork Loota		
2015	Skylanders: SuperChargers	Gill Grunt, Gill Runt, Chef Pepper Jack		
2016	Doom	Samuel Hayden, UAC Soldier		
2016	Overwatch	Reinhardt		
2016	Lego Star Wars: The Force Awakens	Darth Vader (Unmasked), Varond Jelik		
2016	Skylanders: Imaginators	Gill Grunt, Gill Runt, Chef Pepper Jack		
2016	Final Fantasy XV	Ardyn Izunia	English dub	
2016	World of Warcraft: Legion	Trade Prince Gallywix, Battlelord Gaardoun, Eredar Summoner Males, Azuregos, Shadowlord Slaghammer, Jergosh the Invoker, Grand Artificer Romuul,		
2017	Halo Wars 2	Shipmaster Let 'Volir		
2017	Psychonauts in the Rhombus of Ruin	Truman Zanotto, Psi Jet Computer		
2017	Nier: Automata	Terminal Alpha, Terminal Beta		
2017	XCOM 2: War of the Chosen	Chosen Warlock		
2017	Destiny 2	Emperor Calus		
2017	Middle-earth: Shadow of War	Nazgûl, Olog-Hai, Humans		
2017	Call of Duty: WWII	General Hank Ridaeu	Nazi Zombies mode only	
2018	World of Warcraft: Battle for Azeroth	N'zoth		
2018	Spider-Man	J. Jonah Jameson		
2018	Lego DC Super-Villains	Mammoth, Trigon		
2018	Spyro Reignited Trilogy	Nestor, Boris, Cyprin, Rosco, Bubba		
2018	Darksiders III	Lord of the Hollows, Sloth, Charred Council, Phantom Guard Captain, Prince of Darkness		
2018	Red Dead Redemption 2	The Local Pedestrian Population		
2019	Crackdown 3	Alois Quist		
2019	Sekiro: Shadows Die Twice	Owl		
2019	The Outer Worlds	Reed Tobson		
2019	Death Stranding	Benjamin Hancock		
2020	Persona 5 Strikers	Additional voices		
2020	Doom Eternal	Samuel Hayden, Samur Maykr, Seraphim		
2020	Dissidia Final Fantasy NT	Ardyn Izunia	English dub	
2020	Fallout 76: Wastelanders	Doctor Loris, Settler Forager, Settlers		
2020	Apex Legends	Revenant		
2020	Avengers	Hulk		
2020	Spider-Man: Miles Morales	J. Jonah Jameson		
2020	Yakuza: Like a Dragon	Mamoru Takabe		
2021	Psychonauts 2	Truman Zanotto, Croupier, Mysterious Figure, Germ Attendant, Germ Dad, Lance, Slinky Worm, Larry		
2021	Halo Infinite	Escharum, Grand Edict		
2021	Call of Duty: Vanguard	Professor Gabriel Krafft	Zombies mode only	
2022	Overwatch 2	Reinhardt		
2022	Tactics Ogre: Reborn	Andoras Gaffryn, Xaebos Ronsenbach		
2022	Saints Row	Atticus Marshall	Credited as Darin DePaul	
2022	Star Ocean: The Divine Force	Additional voices	Credited as Darin DePaul	
2022	Marvel's Midnight Suns	Ghost Rider, Venom, Chthon		
2023	Destiny 2: Lightfall	Emperor Calus		
2023	Spider-Man 2	J. Jonah Jameson		
2024	Fortnite Battle Royale	Doctor Doom		
2024	Batman: Arkham Shadow	Carmine Falcone		
2025	Doom: The Dark Ages	Kreed Maykr, The Architect		
2025	Yakuza 0 Director's Cut	Yamanoi		
2025	Dune: Awakening	Count Hasimir Fenring, Glossu Rabban, Water Shipper		
2025	Borderlands 4	Idolator Sol		
2026	Marathon	Gaius, Gus Moraine		
2026	Order of the Sinking Star	The Wizard		

=== Live-action ===
List of acting performances in television
Year	Series	Role	Notes	Source
1989	Miami Vice	Alonzo	Episode: "Hard Knocks"	
2003	Law & Order	Foreperson	Episode: "Kid Pro Quo"	
2025	The Thundermans: Undercover	Mastermind (voice)	Recurring role	
