= Ardyn Izunia =

Final Fantasy XV character

- Final Fantasy character
- Official render of Ardyn Izunia
- First appearance: Kingsglaive: Final Fantasy XV (2016)
- First game: Final Fantasy XV (2016)
- Designed by: Roberto Ferrari
- Voiced by: EN: Darin De Paul; JA: Keiji Fujiwara
- Motion capture: Teruaki Ogawa (Final Fantasy XV); Jon Campling (Kingsglaive)

Ardyn Izunia (Japanese: アーデン・イズニア, Hepburn: Āden Izunia), also known as Ardyn Lucis Caelum (アーデン・ルシス・チェラム, Āden Rushisu Cheramu), is a character from the Final Fantasy video game series made by Square Enix. He is the main antagonist in Final Fantasy XV and a prominent character in the game's associated media, and makes appearances in other Final Fantasy products. Initially presented as chancellor of Niflheim, the nation opposing Lucis for control of its magical Crystal, he is later revealed to be the source of a corruptive plague dubbed the Starscourge and pursuing a vendetta against the family of protagonist Noctis Lucis Caelum.

Ardyn was designed by Italian artist Roberto Ferrari, surviving through the game's prolonged development generally unchanged. He was presented as an unusual villain within the series, initially helpful and kind to Noctis but ultimately driven by revenge and a wish for cruelty. He is voiced in Japanese by Keiji Fujiwara and in English by Darin De Paul. While several critics have commented on his lack of effectiveness as a villain in the game, he became a popular character among series fans. Exploration of his character in both DLC and expanded media met with mixed reactions.

== Creation and development ==
Final Fantasy XV (2016) began production in 2006 as the spin-off game Final Fantasy Versus XIII for PlayStation 3; following a troubled production history, the game was rebranded, resulting in it changing platforms and staff, and seeing multiple story rewrites. Some cut content and backstory elements were made into the prequel film Kingsglaive, and the original net animation (ONA) Brotherhood, part of the multimedia "Final Fantasy XV Universe". Ardyn was designed by Italian artist Roberto Ferrari, who worked on the project from 2010 to 2013. After the initial design work in December 2010, Ferrari "brushed it up" the following month, with it otherwise remaining unchanged. He commented that the in-game version of Izunia was closer to his original design compared to the one shown in Kingsglaive. Ardyn's red hair was chosen as a reference to his Japanese voice actor, who had voiced other red-haired characters in Final Fantasy and Kingdom Hearts.

Ardyn's position as an imperial chancellor was decided due to his antagonistic role, with designer Takatsugu Nakazawa saying Ardyn's villainy suited the "chancellor image". The project's later director Hajime Tabata called Ardyn an unusual antagonist within the Final Fantasy series as he actively helps Noctis through his quest, even though it ultimately serves his desire for revenge. Both Tabata and scenario writer Saori Itamuro called Ardyn a character driven by hatred of the Lucian royal line, with everything in his life serving his quest for revenge and his wish to torment Noctis. Tabata described Ardyn's unique design as tying into his personality, comparing it to the design of Final Fantasy VI antagonist Kefka Palazzo.

Following the game's release, Ardyn was chosen for dedicated downloadable content (DLC) due to positive fan feedback. The DLC entered production during development of Episode Ardyn Prologue, a short ONA detailing Ardyn's backstory. According to its lead staff, the DLC's aim was to show more emotion in Ardyn, while his gameplay featured greater freedom of movement than the main game and a focus on his dark powers. His attacks and takedown animations during gameplay were designed to demonstrate his cruel personality. Some planned takedowns were dropped to preserve the game's CERO rating. The team wanted to create a Final Fantasy with a villain in the lead, a rarity in the series. Ardyn's relationships with his brother Somnus and fiancee Aera were meant to be the focal point of the ONA narrative, but its short length limited this element. The events of the ONA were also intended to lend context to some of Ardyn's in-game actions.

Ardyn is voiced by Keiji Fujiwara in Japanese and Darin De Paul in English. Fujiwara often told the staff he liked Ardyn's character, with the staff noting his enthusiasm and enjoying his performance. Fujiwara was often surprised by the tension he put into his performance, particularly with Ardyn's laughter. For Episode Ardyn, Fujiwara was requested to do "the opposite" of his performance up to that point, starting by portraying a heroic Ardyn before shifting to the established villainous version later in the story. De Paul almost did not audition as he typically played deeper-voiced characters. He changed his mind as he "got [the] character", landing the role with a single take. In Episode Ardyn, De Paul enjoyed portraying Ardyn's contrasting personalities through the narrative. Ardyn's motion capture for XV was performed by Teruaki Ogawa. In Kingsglaive, his motion actor was Jon Campling.

== Appearances ==
=== Final Fantasy XV ===
Ardyn is introduced as the Imperial Chancellor of Eos's Niflheim empire, regarded as both its main political force and benefactor due to introducing Magitek technology into the war with the nation of Lucis over its magical Crystal. In ancient times he was Ardyn Lucis Caelum, a healer who was granted the ability to absorb the Starscourge, a magical plague which threatens Eos with eternal night and turns people into monstrous Daemons. His growing infection grants him immortality and turns his brother Somnus and Eos's magical Crystal against him, an event compounded by the accidental murder of his lover Aera Mirus Fleuret. These events are revealed as part of a plan by the divine Astrals to purge Eos of the Starscourge, using Ardyn as the Scarscourge's vessel to be destroyed by the prophesied True King.

In the present day, he orchestrates the events that lead to Niflheim's invasion of Insomnia, and guides Somnus's descendent Noctis Lucis Caelum in forming Covenants with the Astrals so he can kill him once he becomes the True King. Ardyn reveals his nature by fatally wounding Noctis's fiancee Lunafreya Nox Fleuret, then harassing Noctis first by tricking him into attacking his friend Prompto Argentum, and revealing the truth of their kinship when Noctis reaches the Crystal. After ten years sleeping in the Crystal, Noctis defeats Ardyn in single-combat, then sacrifices himself to destroy Ardyn's immortal spirit and purge Eos of the Starscourge.

In "Episode Ardyn", set thirty years before the game's events, Ardyn is freed from a two millennia imprisonment by Niflheim. Initially reluctant, upon subduing the Astral Ifrit he learns of his apparent destiny to become the True King, and allies with Niflheim to pursue revenge. He embraces his powers, gradually losing his sanity and adopting the name "Izunia" after absorbing the memories of those killed by the Starscourge. Ardyn launches an assault on Insomnia on the coronation day of Noctis's father Regis, nearly killing him to force Somnus to manifest in his spirit form. Ardyn overpowers Somnus before the Astral's leader Bahamut intervenes and reveals Ardyn's destined role. Depending on the player's choice, Ardyn either submits to his fate in exchange for his revenge against Noctis's family, or is tortured into submission by Bahamut; in both cases, he ultimately vows vengeance against the Astrals and Noctis's line.

=== Other appearances ===
Ardyn briefly appears in Kingsglaive as a representative of Niflheim, proposing a truce between the two nations with the marriage of Noctis and Lunafreya. He remains present during most of the film's events accompanying Niflheim's emperor Iedolas Aldercapt up to the invasion of Insomnia and theft of the Crystal. In the novel The Dawn of the Future, a defiant Ardyn rejects his fate, prompting Bahamut to plan the destruction of Eos. Eventually Noctis and a resurrected Lunafreya convince him to perform the ritual of the True King in Noctis's place, allowing him to kill Bahamut, erase the Starscourge, and make peace with Somnus and Aera as he dies.

Ardyn was added as a playable character in the Dissidia subseries. He was a DLC character for both the home console and arcade versions of Dissidia Final Fantasy NT. Ardyn was the last original character added before Square Enix ended support for the game in 2020. He was added as a permanent addition to the mobile title Dissidia Opera Omnia in December 2019 in Japan, and September 2020 in English regions.

Ardyn, along with other characters from XV, was featured as ability card in the mobile game Mobius Final Fantasy. He was released as a recruitable character for Final Fantasy Brave Exvius, featuring abilities based on his actions in the main game and a special attack with a CGI sequence. Different depictions of the character also feature in the Final Fantasy Trading Card Game. He was later featured as an enemy character in the rhythm game spin-off Theatrhythm Final Bar Line, with artist Monster Octopus simplifying trademark elements of his design for the game's art style. Outside the Final Fantasy series, Ardyn made a cameo appearance in a crossover with Ubisoft's Assassin's Creed: Origins (2017), and featured as a character skin in a collaboration with Minecraft in 2018.

== Reception ==
Ardyn has received a generally positive reception from players. Ardyn ranked No. 63 in the Top 75 of NHK's "All-Final Fantasy Grand Poll of Japanese players" in 2020, which tallied over 468,000 votes. De Paul's performance was also singled out for praise by journalists. Philip Kollar from Wired in his review of Kingsglaive described Ardyn as a "particularly dandy-looking envoy from Niflheim who bears more than a passing resemblance to Tom Baker's Doctor Who". Joe Anderstron from Digital Spy had mixed feelings with regards to his role in Final Fantasy XV based on what Kingslave foreshadowed, but found him interesting.

Eurogamer's Aolfe Wilson described Ardyn as an "utterly unremarkable" antagonist compared to either Kefka Palazzo or Final Fantasy VII antagonist Sephiroth. Michael Cunningham of RPGamer commented that Ardyn stood out from the rest of the supporting cast due to his mysterious characterization, developing into a "creepy" villain as the story progressed. Salvatore Pane, writing for Paste Magazine, said Ardyn killing Lunafreya had a major impact in the narrative due the amount of grief the characters−specifically Noctis−suffer as a result for the first time in the entire game.

Mike Fahey from Kotaku praised Ardyn's portrayal as the setting's overarching antagonist, citing Episode Ardyn and its anime tie-in as highlights for his character development and making his vendetta against Noctis's family "fully justified". RPG Site's George Foster was very positive, saying the DLC "manages to turn a previously interesting, but oftentimes one-note villain, into a sympathetic figure". Destructoid stated that while Ardyn was kept as a mysterious and interesting villain in Final Fantasy XV, the DLC managed to properly explore his past through both narrative and gameplay. USGamer's Hirun Cryer was less positive, faulting Ardyn's overarching characterisation and saying the episode's narrative undermined the work done during the anime tie-in. Eurogamer Italy felt Episode Ardyn prioritised fan service at the expense of narrative coherence surrounding Ardyn's character and motivations.

Ardyn's role in The Dawn of the Future was poorly received overall. Despite praising his character writing, Anime UK faulted Ardyn as "easily the low point of the novel", feeling that Jun Eishima's writing style undermined the retelling of Ardyn's past and motivations. Anime News Network's James Beckett called Ardyn's dedicated chapter the worst part of the book, with its events failing to make the character a compelling antagonist. RPGFan's Peter Triezenberg, who had disliked Ardyn's portrayal in his DLC episode, found the novel did little to redeem his character due to wanting to make him sympathetic after the game's highly antagonistic portrayal.
