= Brotherhood: Final Fantasy XV =

2016 Japanese anime series

- Key visual featuring the four main characters in the bottom right corner. From bottom right going clockwise: Gladiolus, Prompto, Noctis, and Ignis.

ブラザーフッド ファイナルファンタジーXV (Burazāfuddo: Fainaru Fantajī Fifutīn)
- Created by: Square Enix
- Original net animation
- Directed by: Soichi Masui
- Produced by: Kazuki Adachi; Akio Ofuji (Square Enix)
- Written by: Akio Ofuji; Yuniko Ayana
- Music by: Yasuhisa Inoue; Susumi Akizuki
- Studio: A-1 Pictures
- Released: March 30, 2016 – September 17, 2016
- Runtime: 10 to 15 minutes
- Episodes: 5

Brotherhood: Final Fantasy XV (Japanese: ブラザーフッド ファイナルファンタジーXV, Hepburn: Burazāfuddo: Fainaru Fantajī Fifutīn) is an original net animation series directed by Soichi Masui, produced by Akio Ofuji, written by Yuniko Ayana, and composed for by Yasuhisa Inoue and Susumi Akizuki. Co-produced by Square Enix and A-1 Pictures, it is based on the setting and story of the 2016 video game Final Fantasy XV, which is thematically connected to the Fabula Nova Crystallis subseries. Brotherhood is set within the events of Final Fantasy XV, and details the backstories of Noctis Lucis Caelum and his friends.

Brotherhood was made as part of a planned multimedia expansion of Final Fantasy XV without the need to develop a series of games. The series was conceived by Ofuji in 2014, based on his wish to expand upon an in-game reference to the difficult childhood of one of the characters. The story focuses on themes of brotherhood and friendship, and was designed to give players glimpses into the personal lives and personalities of the characters that would not have fitted within the game.

The series ran from March 30 to September 17, 2016. Streaming free online through YouTube and Crunchyroll, the series was bundled with different editions of Final Fantasy XV, alongside fellow spin-off title Kingsglaive: Final Fantasy XV. The Ultimate Collector's Edition of the game included additional scenes focusing on the character Lunafreya Nox Fleuret. The episodes were among the most popular videos on the game's official YouTube channel, and opinions on the anime have been generally positive.

== Synopsis ==
Brotherhood is set on the Earth-like world of Eos, occurring within the events of Final Fantasy XV. The kingdom of Lucis, keeper of the magical Crystal, has been at war with the technologically advanced empire of Niflheim, the latter dominating much of the known world. After many years of war, a peace is agreed between Lucis and Niflheim. As part of the peace agreements, Noctis Lucis Caelum—son of the reigning King Regis and heir to the Lucian throne—is to marry Lunafreya Nox Fleuret, former princess of Tenebrae and now hostage of Niflheim. Noctis sets off to marry Lunafreya in the company of his loyal companions and friends: Gladiolus Amicitia, Prompto Argentum, and Ignis Scientia. On their journey, Niflheim betrays and invades Lucis, stealing the crystal and killing Regis, leaving Noctis to go on a quest to reclaim his throne and defeat Niflheim.

== Production ==
Brotherhood: Final Fantasy XV forms part of the "Final Fantasy XV Universe", a multimedia project based around the 2016 video game Final Fantasy XV that also includes the theatrical CGI film Kingsglaive: Final Fantasy XV: the story of XV was large enough to have covered several games, but as the team did not want to create any additional games, they decided to create additional media. While similar in style to the Compilation of Final Fantasy VII project, the media associated with Final Fantasy XV came before the game's release rather than after it, acting as insight into the world and characters. XV and its associated media likewise hold a thematic connection to Fabula Nova Crystallis Final Fantasy, a compilation of games and associated media sharing a common mythos while boasting unconnected stories and settings. While distanced from the brand for marketing purposes, the world of XV still uses its mythos and design elements. Brotherhood was designed so it would not be necessary for people to watch for understanding of the main game. Following the release of the game, director Hajime Tabata described Brotherhood and Kingsglaive as granting a better view of the game's world, adding that those who only played the game might notice the missing context.

Brotherhood was co-produced by Square Enix, the game's developers, and anime studio A-1 Pictures. Square Enix staff ensured that the staff of A-1 Pictures stayed true to the game. A-1 Pictures had previously worked with Square Enix on "On the Way to a Smile", a short animated film included with Final Fantasy VII: Advent Children Complete Edition, and both had frequently voiced willingness to work together again. It was directed by Soichi Masui, written by Yuniko Ayana, and had music written by Yasuhisa Inoue and Susumi Akizuki. The series originated due to producer Akio Ofuji, who was also the marketing producer for the Final Fantasy series. Ofuji's favorite character from the game was Prompto, and the anime grew from the wish to expand upon a reference in the game to the character's difficult childhood. The concept was first proposed in 2014, a year and a half before its reveal. Its format as an anime series was based both on staff suggestions and the fact that Kingsglaive was already in production as a CGI feature. Episodes were produced fairly quickly, being created and released at monthly intervals. As they were released, the creators took fan feedback into account when creating future episodes. The nature of Brotherhood as a free anime caused problems when it came to funding the project: this had been decided upon to get the anime to the widest audience possible. Ultimately, the budget was split between the total production costs of Final Fantasy XV and projected physical sales after the anime's release.

Ofuji was responsible for creating the basic scenario from which Brotherhood's main writers would work: working from the character sheets created by the writers of XV, he created the entire scenario based on each character's background characteristics, such as Ignis' love of baking and Prompto's childhood obesity. The anime focuses on themes of brotherhood and friendship, and includes interpersonal scenes that could not be included in the game. Its storyline details the backstory of Noctis from his childhood to the game's opening, along with the backstories of his companions. The first and last episodes tie directly into the events of Platinum Demo: Final Fantasy XV, a free tech demo showing Noctis' journey through a dreamworld during a near-death experience. The anime also serves as an introduction for potential players to the characters. In previous Final Fantasy games, the player party was built up gradually over the course of the game. In XV, the complete party is available from the start, and since the backstory moments could not be fitted into the game, the anime serves as a similar means of allowing players to sympathize with them. Each episode's events also helped detail some of the characters' different social classes, with the cited example being the contrast between Prompto's small house and hard-working parents when compared to Gladiolus' more luxurious life.

== Release ==
Brotherhood was first announced on March 30, 2016, at "Uncovered: Final Fantasy XV", a media event dedicated to the game; the first episode aired immediately following the event. Each episode was released online for free through the game's official YouTube channel and concluded with the fifth episode on September 17 the same year. They were also streamed through online service Crunchyroll. Each episode is approximately ten to fifteen minutes long. This format was chosen over the standard 23-minute format as it would tell the desired stories without the viewers getting bored. All episodes of Brotherhood were included as part of the Ultimate Collector's Edition of Final Fantasy XV on a Blu-ray disc. The series was also included in the "Final Fantasy XV Film Collection", a box set which includes Final Fantasy XV and Kingsglaive. Bonus scenes focusing on Lunafreya were included exclusively as part of the Ultimate Collector's Edition. The series was edited together into a 30-minute episode and broadcast on Japan's Tokyo MX network on September 30. The five episodes were also broadcast on Niconico during a launch event livestream on November 28, the day before the worldwide launch of Final Fantasy XV. The planned run only extended to five episodes, but Ofuji stated that depending on public reception to the series, further episodes could be produced.

=== Episodes ===
No.	Title	Original release date
1	"Before the Storm"	March 30, 2016
Noctis sets out on his journey to meet Lunafreya, during which he hears about the attack on Lucis' capital, Insomnia, and must fight off attacks from Niflheim magitek troops. He also remembers the Daemon attack in his childhood which left him seriously wounded: at the end of the episode, he encounters the Daemon again as part of a Niflheim attack force.
2	"Dogged Runner"	June 14, 2016
Prompto's backstory is revealed as he is tending to a wounded wild puppy found on the road. Initially an introverted and obese student at Noctis' school, his chance encounter and care for one of Lunafreya's puppies results in him being asked by her to be Noctis' friend. By the time the two were attending high school, Prompto had slimmed down and gained new confidence, though Noctis still recognized him from their first meeting and accepted him as a friend.
3	"Sword and Shield"	July 7, 2016
Gladiolus's origins with Noctis are shown within the frame of a monster encounter that turns into a friendly contest between Noctis and Gladiolus. Initially seeing Noctis as a spoiled and self-centered child, his opinion is changed drastically when Noctis helps keep Gladiolus' sister Iris out of trouble by taking the blame for going outside the Citadel grounds with her. Gladiolus and Noctis formed a close bond, which became a firm friendship by the events of XV.
4	"Bittersweet Memories"	August 17, 2016
The origins of Ignis' relationship with Noctis is revealed when the group stays in the town of Lestallum, and Ignis attempts to recreate a favorite dessert of Noctis'. As he begins to feel the effects of maintaining Lucis' magical Wall, Regis entrusts Ignis with caring for Noctis. While initially carefree, Noctis becomes disturbed when he sees how far Regis has declined, and has an argument with Ignis when confronted with his future as king. Eventually facing his position, Noctis and Ignis reconcile.
5	"The Warmth of Light"	September 17, 2016
The episode picks up where "Before the Storm" left off, with Noctis charging at the Daemon that almost killed him. He charges at it alone, and after a fierce battle is beaten back—during the fight, he remembers everything about the first attack, including how his father only managed to drive it away. Noctis finds new resolve in these memories, and kills the Daemon with the help of his companions, which causes him great emotion. The four then resume their road trip to Altissia.

== Reception ==
The initial reaction to the series was better than the developers had initially expected, with the first episode getting more views than anticipated upon release. As of November 2016, the anime episodes were among the most viewed on the game's official YouTube channel. "Before the Storm" was the most watched video on the channel, with over 2,330,000 views. "Dogged Runner" was fifth with over 614,000, while "Sword and Shield" and "Bittersweet Memories" were at #13 and #14 with over 431,790 and 344,000 views respectively. The final episode had the lowest viewing figures, with just over 110,000. Versions of episodes on the channel featuring multi-lingual subtitles also had view counts above 100,000.

In her review of the anime's first episode, Meghan Sullivan of IGN praised the visuals and fight choreography, but felt that the story would be confusing to those not already familiar with the game. She finished by calling the episode "a solid start to what will hopefully be a memorable anime". Michelle Nguyen of Geek.com, writing following the release of "Sword and Shield", was generally positive about the anime, praising its characters despite her dislike for the lack of playable female characters in the game itself. Speaking about each episode, she found the first episode to be rather weak, and ranked "Dogged Runner" high for changing Prompto into a more complex character. Andrew Webster, writing for The Verge, said that the anime captured the game's mixture of humor and traditional role-playing story tropes, sharing Nguyen's praise for "Dogged Runner", and saying that the anime made him more eager to play the game itself.

Destructoid's Chris Carter, in an article on the release of the final episode, said he enjoyed the anime overall, although he found the final episode lax on story when compared to the rest of the series due to its focus on action. He stated that he "bought into" the relationships between Noctis and the other characters. In an article summarizing Final Fantasy XV and its associated media, GamesRadar called the episodes "surprisingly well-written" and "well worth watching", noting its focus on personal stories compared to the grander narrative of Kingsglaive. In a similar article, Kotaku UK's Kim Snaith said that the anime "perfectly [sets] the scene for where Final Fantasy XV picks up".
