= ComicsVerse =

Comics website and podcast

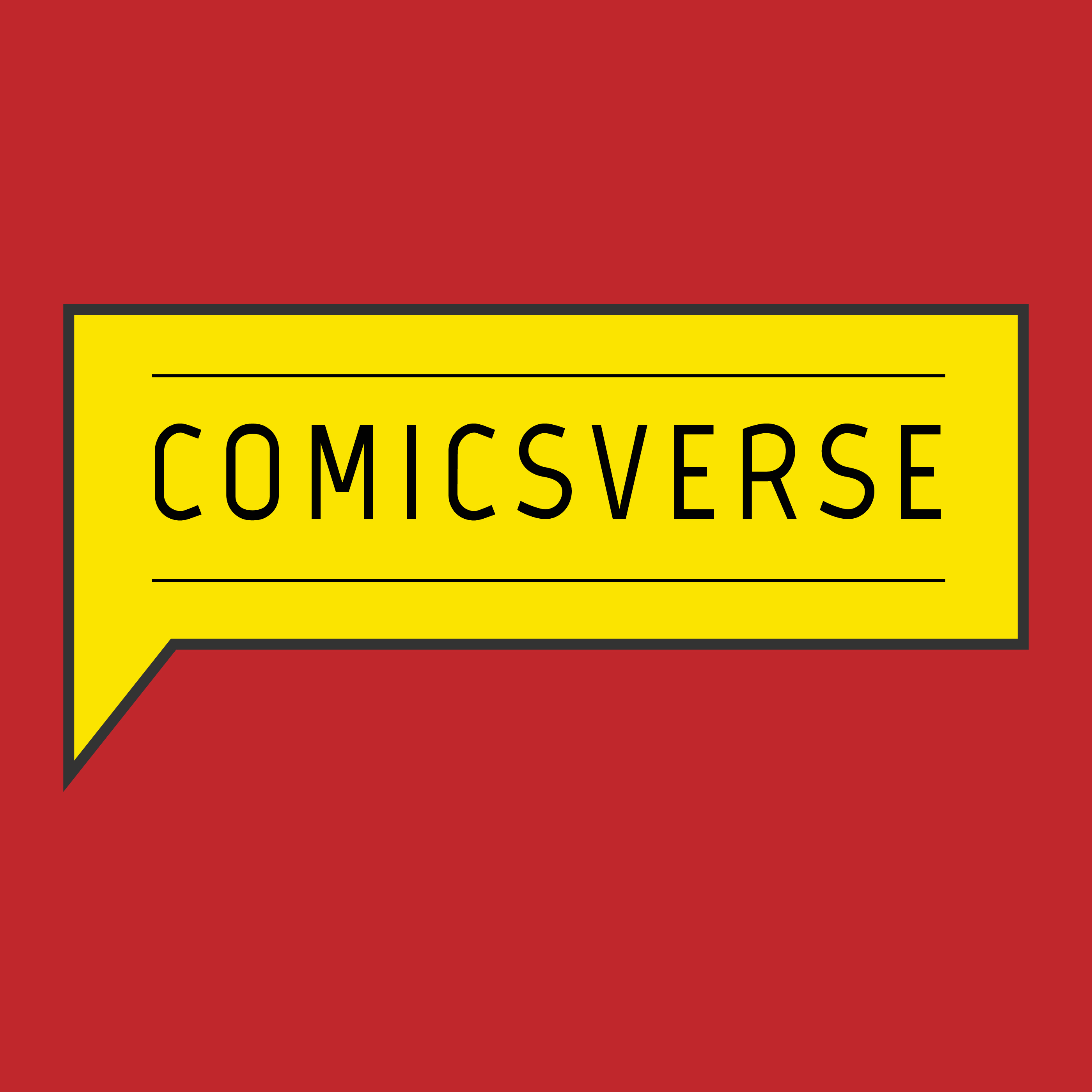
- Website type: Comics news
- Available in: English
- Dissolved: May 2020
- Owner: Atabey Media Inc.
- CEO: Justin Alba
- Website: www.comicsverse.com
- Launched: 2012
- Current status: Inactive

ComicsVerse was a comics journalism website covering comics news, reviews, analysis, and interviews with artists and writers. In addition to original written content, the site produced podcasts, videos, original webcomics, and covers news related to politics, gaming, movies, television, and music.

ComicsVerse used comics to address social issues including minority representation in popular culture and politics. The website was minority owned and operated and had 78% women in upper management positions.

No new content has been published since May 2020.

== History ==
Founded in 2012 by Justin Alba, ComicsVerse was incorporated in 2016. Alba and colleague Kathleen Wisneski, co-organized the ComicsVerse podcast alongside the site following a class at Columbia University in 2012 entitled "Comic Books and Graphic Novels as Literature."

In his Open Letter, Alba writes that "comics saved my life" by teaching him how to cope with severe bullying and develop self-confidence. Alba notes that ComicsVerse's goal was to "help people like me who went through challenging and turbulent times" by engaging in a community of comics fans and creators.

ComicsVerse immediately treated comics as an art form, rejecting the tendency in academia to dismiss comics as anti-literary. Since its inception, ComicsVerse has expanded its discussion of mainstream comics like Marvel and DC to include comics from smaller and independent publishers, as well as comics-related television and film, and politics and culture outside of comics.

ComicsVerse featured a Special Edition series on New York Comic Con, focusing on creator interviews and character analysis in Marvel, DC, Image and indie comics.

== Purpose ==
ComicsVerse defined its mission to use "comics as a platform to discuss social issues of our time like race, sexuality, gender and inequality" ComicsVerse investigates diversity in comic books and pop culture in order discuss representation, social justice, and build a community.

ComicsVerse writer and Kat Vendetti spoke to the BBC in 2018 regarding Ms Marvel, Captain America, and the first Muslim women superheroes. ComicsVerse has also discussed racial diversity in X-Men and New Mutants. The website's Feminist Voices and Queer Voices pages gathered articles related to social equality for women and people who identify as LGBTQ+

In 2017, ComicsVerse was recognized by the Southern Poverty Law Center’s Hatewatch for its story on The Dangers of Normalizing the Alt-Right.

== Podcast ==
The ComicsVerse podcast has an international audience. The podcast has earned attention for its in-depth discussion of politics, human rights, and social justice as well as character analyses, creator interviews, and coverage of comics-related events like the New York Comic Con.

The podcast balances discussion of mainstream superhero comics with niche graphic narratives, using different genres and media to investigate political topics.

In 2017 the webcomic was nominated for a People's Choice Podcast Award in entertainment.
