= Lunafreya Nox Fleuret =

Final Fantasy XV character

- Final Fantasy character
- Official CGI render of Lunafreya
- First appearance: Brotherhood: Final Fantasy XV (2016)
- First game: Final Fantasy XV (2016)
- Created by: Hajime Tabata
- Designed by: Yusuke Naora
- Voiced by: English: Amy Shiels (XV) Lena Headey (Kingsglaive) Liliana Chomsky (child); Japanese: Rina Kitagawa (XV) Shioli Kutsuna (Kingsglaive)
- Motion capture: Yumi Yoshitatsu (XV); Amanda Piery (Kingsglaive)

Lunafreya Nox Fleuret (Japanese: ルナフレーナ・ノックス・フルーレ, Hepburn: Runafurēna Nokkusu Furūre; Lunafrena Nox Fleuret), "Luna" (ルーナ, Rūna) for short, is a character from the Final Fantasy video game series made by Square Enix. She is a central character in Final Fantasy XV (2016), originally a spin-off title called Final Fantasy Versus XIII, a prominent character in the game's associated media, and has made appearances in mobile projects within the Final Fantasy franchise. Lunafreya is the Oracle, a powerful figure in the game's world of Eos who communes with its deities, the Astrals. Originally engaged to main protagonist Noctis Lucis Caelum as part of a political marriage, she remotely helps Noctis's quest to become the True King of legend and save their world from darkness.

Lunafreya was created by director Hajime Tabata to replace another character, the similarly named Stella Nox Fleuret, during story rewrites between 2012 and 2014. She was designed by Yusuke Naora, with her design being influenced by Tabata's concept of a woman handling responsibilities from a young age. While voiced by Amy Shiels and Rina Kitagawa in the game, Lena Headey and Shioli Kutsuna voiced her in the film Kingsglaive (2016). Game journalists faulted her portrayal and limited role in the game, with Lunafreya often being mentioned as part of criticism surrounding the game's supporting cast. Her role in expanded media has likewise seen mixed reactions for her inconsistent portrayal.

== Concept and design ==
=== Origins ===
Lunafreya was designed as a replacement for Stella Nox Fleuret, the heroine of Final Fantasy Versus XIII.

Final Fantasy XV began production in 2006 as the spin-off game Final Fantasy Versus XIII for PlayStation 3; following a troubled production history, the game was rebranded, resulting in it changing platforms and staff, and seeing multiple story rewrites. The original heroine of Versus XIII was Stella Nox Fleuret. Stella was designed by the game's original director and character designer Tetsuya Nomura, first appearing in promotional media in 2007. He wanted her to "stand out from all previous [Final Fantasy heroines]" as a character.

The relationship between Stella and protagonist Noctis Lucis Caelum was meant to be platonic rather than romantic, as Nomura preferred portraying a different kind of relationship between male and female protagonists. She was intended to be a very polite person, with that politeness conveyed through specific dialogue traits. A key scene for Stella was the meeting and conversation with Noctis during the opening scenes. During early parts of development, Stella could also wield magical powers in battle, and would have been forced into fighting Noctis. Her powers were associated with Etro, a goddess in the Fabula Nova Crystallis subseries of which Versus XIII was a core part. The game later dropped the subseries's deities and terminology while maintaining thematic elements.

During the transition from Versus XIII to XV during 2012 to 2014, which aimed to condense the story down into a single game rather than the planned series, the developers envisioned a different type of heroine which did not fit with Stella's original role. Stella was already known to and expected by fans who had followed the game's development, which worried the team. Redesigning Stella to play a more active role in the story was considered, but new director Hajime Tabata was uncomfortable about this. Faced with the scenario of fans being disappointed if Stella's personality or role were changed, the developers instead opted to replace her entirely. Her final appearance was in 2013 during the game's reveal under its new title.

=== Development ===
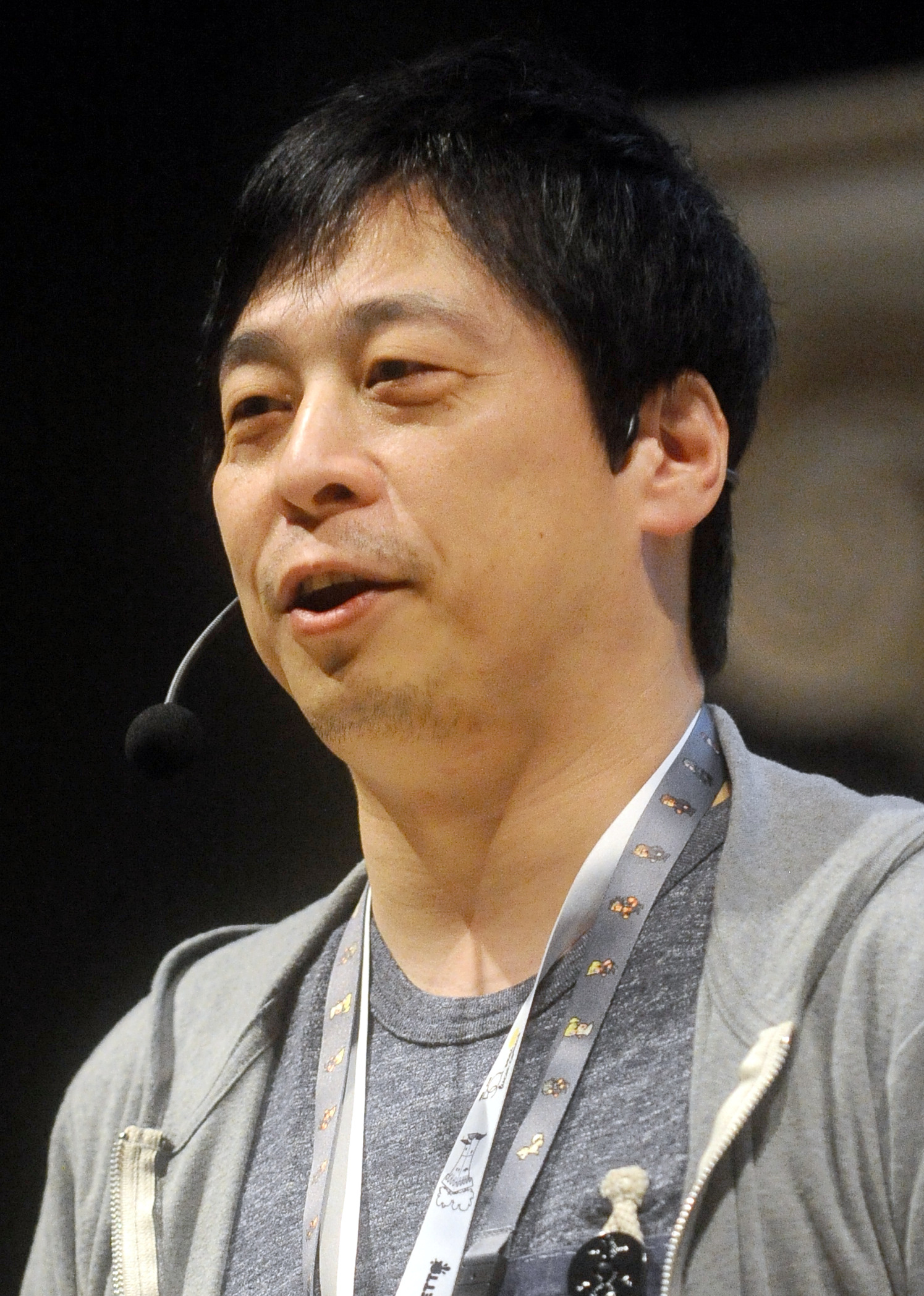
Hajime Tabata, the director of Final Fantasy XV from 2014 to the game's release, created the character of Lunafreya.

Tabata created Lunafreya as a replacement heroine for the rewritten story, allowing the team to work without previous character constraints. While Lunafreya was superficially similar and retained a connection to divine powers, Stella's specific magical abilities were removed as they did not fit with the new character and reworked narrative. During the design process, it was decided that Lunafreya would assume and accept responsibilities from a young age, putting her in direct contrast with Noctis; this required Lunafreya to be older than Noctis, which influenced elements of her character design. According to Tabata, the relationship between Noctis and Lunafreya was not a typical love story despite their being engaged. He also defined Lunafreya's personality as being stronger than either Stella or Noctis, attributing much of Noctis's development in the story to Lunafreya's influence. The scene after her death where her spirit communicates with Noctis was created by staff as a homage to a scene featuring Aerith Gainsborough, a lead character in the earlier series entry Final Fantasy VII (1997).

Lunafreya was designed by Yusuke Naora. Her appearance was defined by Tabata as "strong and heroic", which would be conveyed by her expressions and actions. Lunafreya was designed to give off the look of a strong-willed woman. To achieve this, the designers focused on the shape of her eyes and mouth, blending her appearance in Final Fantasy XV with that in the film prequel Kingsglaive (2016) so she could project an air of grace and strength even when standing still. Her face needed to reflect a wide range of emotions born from her goals, which resulted in her expressions being "serious and somewhat sad". Naora remembered Lunafreya as one of the hardest characters he had to design. To convey Lunafreya's strong will and high-born status through her appearance, Naora consulted a professional hairstylist and makeup artist; the way makeup was applied to her eyes and mouth was changed accordingly, and her hairstyle was done to resemble "something that would require the assistance of a handmaiden". Care was taken not to make her too prim, so that players could relate more to her. To maximize the character's realism, her hairstyle was first created using a mannequin's wig, then rendered into the game's Luminous Engine. The wedding dress she is meant to wear for her marriage to Noctis was created by English fashion designer Vivienne Westwood for her 2014/15 couture collection.

The game's Yoshitaka Amano-designed logo art, initially described as an important goddess in the game's world, was later described as a version of Lunafreya. An early concept for the ending was Lunafreya appearing in a divine form modelled after the logo to lend Noctis her power during the final battle. Noctis's Japanese voice actor, Tatsuhisa Suzuki, asked Tabata to include Noctis in the game's logo alongside Lunafreya. This idea was approved by the team when it was decided to include in the ending with Amano drawing the two characters together. This combined logo was described as representing both the beginning of a new journey, and the game's development history.

=== Portrayal ===
When creating Lunafreya, Tabata was conscious of parallels with Final Fantasy X protagonist Yuna, with his goal being to create an alternate take on the concept of a pious and determined woman. Lunafreya was described by Kingsglaive director Takeshi Nozue as the "keystone" linking the narratives of Final Fantasy XV and its two larger multimedia supplements, Kingsglaive and the original net animation Brotherhood. While she did not have an active role in Kingsglaive, her character strength was conveyed through a single-minded determination to reach her goal. Lunafreya was used later as a model for the design of Aera Mirus Fleuret, an ancestress introduced in media relating the main antagonist Ardyn Izunia.

Lunafreya is voiced by Rina Kitagawa in the Japanese version. She is voiced by Amy Shiels as an adult and Liliana Chomsky as a child for the English dub. Shiels described the role as interesting due to the character's combined strength and vulnerability. In Kingsglaive, the character is voiced by Shioli Kutsuna in Japanese and Lena Headey in English. The voice casting in Kingsglaive, for both English and Japanese, focused on well-known actors to broaden the movie's appeal. Kutsuna had never performed a voice role in a CGI film before, finding the experience unusual. She described Lunafreya as a strong and polite person, using that politeness to effectively deliver even more emotional or unusual lines. She was the last to record her lines, basing some of her performances on the other actors' recordings. Originally there were plans for both the film and game to share a voice cast, but these were scrapped. Lunafreya's motion capture was performed by Yumi Yoshitatsu in XV, and Amanda Piery in Kingsglaive. For her appearance in Kingsglaive, she was modelled on Russian model Sonya Maltceva.

== Appearances ==
=== Final Fantasy XV ===
Lunafreya Nox Fleuret is the princess of Tenebrae, an initially-independent nation within the game's world of Eos. She forms an early connection with Noctis when her mother, Queen Sylva, cures him of an infection of Starscourge, a magical plague which threatens Eos with eternal night. Following the death of Sylva during Niflheim's attempted assassination of Regis and Noctis during Tenebrae's invasion, Lunafreya becomes the new Oracle, a religious figure who communes with Eos's deities the Astrals and keeps the Starscourge from overwhelming Eos. Her dedication to Noctis's destiny as the prophesied True King who will destroy the Starscourge strains her relationship with her brother Ravus, who blames Noctis's father Regis for Sylva's death. She forms a strong bond with Gentiana, the human form of the Astral Shiva, consequently rekindling the latter's faith in humanity.

As part of a peace treaty between Niflheim and Noctis's home of Insomnia, she is to be wed Noctis in a political marriage. During Noctis's quest following Niflheim's conquest of Insomnia, Lunafreya wakes the Astrals, forming covenants with them to ensure they lend him their powers. It is later revealed that the covenants with the Astrals are slowly killing her, and she had been counting on Ravus to finish what she started should she die before reaching Noctis. As she is forming a covenant with the Astral Leviathan, she is mortally wounded by Ardyn, giving the Ring of the Lucii, a magical ring key to the prophecy of the True King for Noctis after her death. Lunafreya continues to support Noctis in spirit form, aiding him directly in his final confrontation with Ardyn, before reuniting with Noctis in the afterlife after he dies purging the Starscourge from Eos.

=== Related media ===
As the central heroine of Final Fantasy XV, Lunafreya appears across its multimedia expansions. She is featured in parts of Brotherhood, with additional footage being created for a Blu-ray release and incorporated into the existing anime. She appears in the second episode of Brotherhood, interacting with Prompto Argentum by letter after he helps one of her dogs Pryna and encourages him to become a friend to Noctis. During the events of Kingsglaive, Lunafreya unsuccessfully attempts to reach Noctis and his father Regis, then becomes central to Niflheim's infiltration and eventual invasion of Lucis's capital Insomnia. Lunafreya escapes with the Ring of the Lucii as both Regis and Kingsglaive member Nyx Ulric sacrifice themselves to ensure her escape.

Lunafreya was intended to be a playable character in Dawn of the Future, a series of downloadable content episodes portraying an alternate finale to the game. All but the first episode were cancelled due to internal changes, and the storyline reworked into a novel of the same name. The novel also incorporated cut concepts for the game's ending. In the novel, Lunafreya is resurrected by the chief Astral Bahamut to become a replacement for the rebellious Ardyn in his plan to purge Eos of the Starscourge; initially falling in line, Lunafreya decides to rebel in turn against his new plan to purge Eos of life. While initially used by Bahamut to empower him using the Starscourge, she is saved by Noctis, ultimately surviving when Gentiana heals her as the Astrals vanish following Bahamut's death at the hands of Noctis and Ardyn.

=== Other appearances ===
Lunafreya, along with other characters from XV, was featured as ability card in the mobile game Mobius Final Fantasy. Lunafreya was featured in a themed quest in Final Fantasy Record Keeper. She was released as a recruitable character for Final Fantasy Brave Exvius, featuring abilities based on her actions in the main game. She was later released as a playable character in Dissidia Final Fantasy Opera Omnia. She is also featured as one of the available advisors in the spin-off game Final Fantasy XV: A New Empire.

=== Promotion and merchandise ===
Lunafreya was the most visible female character in trailers and marketing material leading up to the release of Final Fantasy XV. A skin based on Lunafreya was released as part of a DLC pack based on the cast of Final Fantasy XV for Minecraft in 2018. An action figure of Lunafreya was released in Square Enix's Play Arts Kai line. It features articulated arms, alternate hands and the character's signature accessory, the Trident of the Oracle. Different depictions of the character also feature in the Final Fantasy Trading Card Game.

== Reception ==
Fan reactions to Stella's replacement were generally negative. Tabata defended the change as the best option, allowing fans to continue liking Stella and view her replacement as a new character without preconceptions or expectations. In a pre-release article about the game's portrayal and use of women, USGamer's Naxia Oxford felt that the relegation of female characters including Lunafreya to background and supporting roles went against the series tradition of playable women. Alexa Ray Corriea took a different view towards Lunafreya's acceptance of a traditional female gender role in another pre-release article published by GameSpot. She expressed optimism that Lunafreya would turn out to be a strong female lead character in the final release of Final Fantasy XV after being won over by her presentation in Kingsglaive as a woman with "exceptional fortitude" and an "aura of surety".

Reception of her role in Final Fantasy XV was generally negative. In her review of the game, Electronic Gaming Monthly's Mollie L. Patterson highlighted Lunafreya's role as part of a general criticism of the game's portrayal of female characters. IGN's Vince Ingenito faulted the romantic subplot between Noctis and Lunafreya as poorly written and portrayed. David Roberts of GamesRadar+ mentioned Lunafreya as among the many supporting characters who were not given adequate screentime for the player to either understand them or be told their stories. In a retrospective feature on the game for PC Gamer, Samuel Roberts negatively referenced Lunafreya as "someone you see about four times in the whole game". The tragic nature of her death scene and its impact on Noctis was highlighted by Salvatore Pane of Paste Magazine and Sean Timm of GamesPresso, although Timm felt the scene was undermined by her poor representation up to that point. Commenting on new scenes added in the game's finale in Royal Edition, Jenni Lada of Siliconera praised Lunafreya's summoning of the Astrals to aid Noctis as a fulfillment of earlier mentions of her role in the world.

Her appearances in the expanded media of Final Fantasy XV generally drew mixed reactions. In his review of Kingsglaive, Wired's Matt Kamen was highly critical of its portrayal of female characters, citing Lunafreya as a stereotypical damsel-in-distress despite her screen presence and Headey's performance. Polygon's Ashley Oh described Lunafreya as "a delicate, sickly-looking hindrance [seeming to] negate any progress that other characters make" despite the film's attempts to portray her otherwise. On the other hand, Corriea approved of Lunafreya's role in Kingsglaive; she singled out several moments in the movie where Lunafreya is involved in intense action sequences as well as heated confrontations with antagonistic characters while remaining calm and composed.

Opinions on her portrayal in Dawn of the Future were similarly mixed. James Beckett of Anime News Network felt that Lunafreya's story, alongside that of Noctis, was the best part of the book despite inconsistent writing. Anime UK gave praise to the writing for her character, ranking her and Ardyn as the best-written characters in the book. RPGFan's Peter Triezenberg was less positive, citing her particularly amongst the novel's lead characters due to her inconsistent portrayal in both the book and the Final Fantasy XV universe as a whole. Alex Fuller of RPGamer enjoyed Lunafreya's development through her interactions with supporting character Solara, saying she "get some time to shine and have her motivations brought to the fore".

In NHK's "All-Final Fantasy Grand Poll of Japanese players" in 2020, Lunafreya ranked as #69. Following Kazakh athlete Olga Rypakova's participation at the 2020 Summer Olympics, some fans on social media have compared her appearance to that of Lunafreya's.
