= Characters of the Final Fantasy Type-0 universe =

Final Fantasy Type-0, an action role-playing game developed and published by Square Enix in 2011, revolves around a war between four nations in the world of Orience. An episodic companion game, Final Fantasy Agito, was released in 2014. Type-0 was re-released internationally in 2015 as a high-definition remaster for PlayStation 4 and Xbox One. The main protagonists are Class Zero, a group of students at the magical academy in Rubrum. The story is told through two new members of Class Zero: Machina Kunagiri and Rem Tokimiya. The main character of Agito is a player-created cadet at the Rubrum magical academy. The world and characters were designed by Yusuke Naora, Yusaku Nakaaki and Tetsuya Nomura. Their stories were created by Hajime Tabata, Hiroki Chiba and Sarah Obake.

The main characters are the twelve members of Class Zero: Ace, Deuce, Trey, Cater, Cinque, Sice, Seven, Eight, Nine, Jack, Queen and King. Alongside them are Machina Kunagiri and Rem Tokimiya, old friends who are assigned to Class Zero shortly after the events of the game begin. A guest character is Kurasame Susaya, Class Zero's tutor and a veteran warrior. Other major characters include Arecia Al-Rashia, head of the Rubrum Academy's magical department and a key figure in Orience's lore; Cid Aulstyne, the leader of Milites Empire and the game's main antagonist; and Joker and Tiz, two characters who observe the events of the games.

The concept, which was set within the mythos of the Fabula Nova Crystallis subseries, was for a much darker scenario than other Final Fantasy games. The main cast were designed by Nomura and Naora, while side characters were handled by Nakaaki. Multiple pieces of merchandise and additional media have been created around the characters, including trading cards and multiple manga. They have been the subject of positive reviews in Japan and import reviews: the main praise has gone to their interactions and writing, while the main criticism was difficulties arising from handling the large cast. Western reviews were also generally positive about the character portrayals, but there were criticisms about dialogue, character interactions, and the quality of the localization.

== Concept and creation ==
The original scenario and concept of Final Fantasy Type-0, originally a mobile title named Final Fantasy Agito XIII, was conceived by Hajime Tabata. He wished for a group-driven story as he felt that a single playable character would not be able to properly convey the scope and themes of the story. Because Tabata wanted to show a history of survival told from the point of view of young people caught in a war, it was decided to set the story during a war between four nations. Much of the original story, which mainly revolved about defying the gods, was drawn from popular anime and manga and did not survive. After the platform change to PlayStation Portable, Tabata adopted a story-telling style similar to a documentary film: a direct inspiration for this was Centuries of Picture, a documentary series broadcast on NHK. Alongside that, multiple war films were used as inspiration. Type-0's script was written by Hiroki Chiba and Sarah Okabe. During the rough draft stage, elements such as extra plot points involving Khalia Chival, a boss fight with Arecia, and a main plot thread involving Joker and Tiz were planned. Most of these elements were cut from the final product, meaning elements such as Joker and Tiz's role needed to be included in written texts found in-game so they were not left hanging. The deaths of Class Zero were planned from an early stage, and to emphasize the state of the world, a large number of the supporting cast were killed off near the end. Tabata wanted to create a story depicting different fates for Type-0's characters, and this decision was supported by both staff members and fans of the original. He also implemented the ability for players to decide the course of the story, which was to have been included in the Type-0 when it was still known as Agito XIII. Final Fantasy Agito was given a more upbeat atmosphere when compared to Type-0, although dark and more dramatic moments were still present. The story grew out of what Tabata originally envisioned for Type-0.

The setting of Type-0 was written around the Fabula Nova Crystallis subseries, which also includes Final Fantasy XIII and Final Fantasy XV. The mythos involves how humans are manipulated and controlled by the world's deities. The crystals of Type-0's world were the equivalent of the fal'Cie, demigods serving these deities. Originally, the crystals were to have been called "fal'Cie". The characters Arecia, Gala and Diva were also created to fill the roles of fal'Cie. The approach taken to the incorporation of the mythos was that the world of Orience was part of a shared universe that also contained the worlds of XIII and XV rather than a standalone existence. As opposed to XIII, which told a story directly related to the mythos' deities, Type-0 focused on the human side of the story, depicting the deities' role in world events from a historical standpoint. A key element carried directly from the mythos is the l'Cie, humans chosen by servants of the world's deities to fulfill a pre-determined task called a "Focus". Tabata neglected including elements from the Fabula Nova Crystallis mythos until approximately halfway through the process. Chiba and Obake were the ones responsible for including the elements in the storyline, as well as including the cyclic nature of the game's world to help communicate some aspects of the mythos: originally disliked by Tabata, he later said that it suited the game due to the heavy eastern influences.

=== Character design ===
The characters were designed by regular Final Fantasy designer Tetsuya Nomura, art director Yusuke Naora, co-art director Yusaku Nakaaki, and sub-character designer Roberto Ferrari. Naora asked Nomura to contribute to the character designs. Naora and Nomura did the main cast, while Nakaaki and Ferrari handled secondary characters. Each player character was initially given a basic design trait drawn by Nomura. The design was gradually expanded upon during the creative process, working to avoid making them appear similar. Part of this was giving each character a unique weapon: Deuce's flute and Ace's cards were the most difficult to realize from a technical standpoint. After the world and setting were created, the characters' personalities and traits were finalized: for each character, the team planned how each character originated and the events which happened around them. The main cast's naming system, based on playing cards, was chosen because the team liked the idea. Nomura came up with the idea of having fourteen characters, with thirteen main characters and a "Joker". This idea, originally created for Agito XIII, carried over into Type-0. The characters were made of various heights and builds to emphasize both the game's realism and the characters being teenagers.

While portraying the bonds between the members of Class Zero, and between them and their summoned monsters, along with the game's themes of death and war, Naora drew inspiration from when he saw a cat killed by a car surrounded by other cats. Nomura was in charge of choosing the voice cast, which featured several well-known voice actors. When listening to the samples and picking the actors, Nomura focused on whether they could successfully project the characters' personalities. The actors and actresses helped define the characters, adding individual touches during voice recording sessions. Sayoko Hoshino acted as the game's character texture artist. Originally, she was going to put in black voids where a female character's panties would have been due to hardware limitations. However the staff realized that the players would be looking at the backs of characters a lot, so Hoshino designed panties for each female character and worked with the staff to incorporate them into the character models.

After Type-0's release, Tabata resurrected his initial concept for a mobile game as the prequel Agito. Hoshino became the title's art director. As with Type-0, one of the areas she focused on was the female characters' underwear. The characters' facial animations were done using Silicon Studio's Motion Portrait middleware. For Type-0 HD, the characters' original gameplay models were replaced with updated versions of the original cutscene models due to the latter's higher detail. Due to this higher detail, the cutscene models looked older than the gameplay models, so they needed adjustments to look more like the original models. Their appearances were also adjusted to look more "charming". The game's graphical upgrade was only partially done for the game's characters due to time constraints: while the main cast were given the most attention, secondary characters such as Kurasame received less work.

== Playable characters ==
The fourteen members of Class Zero in Final Fantasy Type-0.

Class Zero (0組, Kurasu Zero) are the main protagonists and playable cast of Type-0, later revealed to have been chosen for their potential to become saviors referred to as Agito, a group of people created to force open the barrier between the mortal world and the Unseen Realm. Each member of Class Zero also appears in Agito, although the others are in different classes while Ace remains a member of Class Zero. They can also be summoned into battle to assist the Cadet. In Type-0, Machina and Rem were recently transferred to Class Zero but not fully classed with the rest of the group. During their battle with the Rursan Arbiter, Class Zero are fatally wounded, and during their final moments, they imagine their possible post-war lives. Their deaths are instrumental in convincing Arecia to free Orience from its cycle of war.

=== Ace ===
Ace (エース, Ēsu) is a cool-headed youth who is one of the first members of Class Zero, able to use cards and with knowledge of magic and warfare. He is one of the few in Orience to be able to sense the raw emotions of the dead and mourn them. He was also a friend of Machina's brother Izana. In Agito, Ace remains a member of Class Zero. First introduced after saving the Cadet from a monster attack, he remains a close ally throughout the game's events. In Agito's second cycle, Ace is chosen to become the Rursan Arbiter and is defeated by the Cadet and the chosen representatives of Agito. In the end credits of Type-0 alternate ending, a character possibly Ace is shown wounded dressed in a samurai outfit at what seems to be the aftermath of a battle. This hints at possible future extensions of the franchise.

Ace later appears as a playable character in Dissidia Final Fantasy NT. Ace is voiced by Jonathon McClendon in English and Yūki Kaji in Japanese.

=== Other Class Zero members ===
While they are members of Class Zero in Type-0, they appear in other classes during the events of Agito:

- Deuce (デュース, Dyūsu), the flute-wielding member of the Class, she's the youngest member and focuses on magic, especially for support. In Agito, she is a member of Class Fourth. She is voiced by Bryce Hitchcock in English and Kana Hanazawa in Japanese.
- Trey (トレイ, Torei), the Class' archer. In Agito, he is a member of Class Eleventh. Trey is voiced by Matthew Mercer in English and Yūichi Nakamura in Japanese.
- Cater (ケイト, Keito), one of the two gun-wielding members of the Class, bearing a magic-infused handgun. Through the course of the game, she experiences the highest amount of deja vu, due to her having gone through the cycle of history more times than the others. In Agito, she is a member of Class Tenth. Cater is voiced by Kristen Klabunde in English and Minori Chihara in Japanese.
- Cinque (シンク, Shinku), the mace-wielding member of the Class. In Agito, she is a member of Class Third. Cinque is voiced by Cristina Valenzuela in English and Aki Toyosaki in Japanese.
- Sice (サイス, Saisu), the scythe-wielding member of the Class. In Agito, she is a member of Class Sixth. Sice is voiced by Corri English in English and Miyuki Sawashiro in Japanese.
- Seven (セブン, Sebun), the chain whip-wielding member of the Class. In Agito, she is a member of Class Seventh. Seven is voiced by Najarra Townsend in English and Mayuko Aoki in Japanese.
- Eight (エイト, Eito), the martial artist of the Class. In Agito, he is a member of Class Fifth. Eight is voiced by Jeff Fischer in English and Miyu Irino in Japanese.
- Nine (ナイン, Nain), the spearman of the Class. In Agito, he is a member of Class Second. Tabata called Nine his favorite character due to his straightforward manner and personality. Nine is voiced by Orion Acaba in English and Daisuke Ono in Japanese.
- Jack (ジャック, Jakku), the katana-wielding member of the Class. In Agito, he is a member of Class Twelfth. Jack is voiced by Cameron Covell in English and Kenichi Suzumura in Japanese.
- Queen (クィーン, Kuīn), the swordswoman of the Class. In Agito, she is a member of Class First. Queen is voiced by Heather Hogan in English and Ami Koshimizu in Japanese.
- King (キング, Kingu), the second gun-wielding member of the Class, bearing twin pistols. In Agito, he is a member of Class Ninth. King is voiced by Mike Vaughn in English and Tomokazu Sugita in Japanese.

=== Machina Kunagiri ===
Machina Kunagiri (マキナ・クナギリ, Makina Kunagiri) is the thirteenth member of Class Zero and acts as one of the game's narrators. During the events of Type-0, Machina became a Milites l'Cie and was forced to kill Rem before joining her in crystal stasis. He is later revived by Arecia to rebuild Orience once the crystals are removed. In Agito, he is a member of Class Second. Machina is voiced by Bryce Papenbrook in English and Hiroshi Kamiya in Japanese.

=== Rem Tokimiya ===
Rem Tokimiya (レム・トキミヤ, Remu Tokimiya) is the fourteenth member of Class Zero and acts as one of the game's narrators. During the events of Type-0, as Finis begins, Rem becomes a Vermillion Bird l'Cie and is fatally wounded by Machina before entering crystal stasis and later being revived by Arecia to rebuild Orience once the crystals are removed. In Agito, she is a member of Class Seventh. Rem is voiced by Peyton McCormick in English and Ryoko Shiraishi in Japanese.

=== Cadet ===
The player-customized Cadet (候補生, Kōho-sei) is the playable character of Final Fantasy Agito. The Cadet's gender, appearance, equipment and other aspects are chosen by the player before the game starts. The Cadet is first encountered when they are saved by Ace from a beast attack, and thereafter become part of Rubrum's general effort to fight against the Milites Empire. Their final appearance is at the end of Orience's second cycle, where Tiz and Joker wish them well and vow to free Orience from its cycle.

== Supporting characters ==
=== Kurasame Susaya ===
Kurasame Susaya (クラサメ・スサヤ) is Class Zero's mentor and a guest character in battle. He is accompanied by a tonberry, a recurring monster in the Final Fantasy series. In earlier years, he was friends with Kazusa and Emina, and his performance on the battlefield earned him the moniker "Reaper of the Icy Blade" (氷剣の死神, Hitsurugi no Shinigami). A betrayal left his lower face permanently scarred, and he wears a mask to hide it. Kurasame is voiced by Robbie Daymond in English and Takahiro Sakurai in Japanese.

=== Arecia Al-Rashia ===
Arecia Al-Rashia (アレシア・アルラシア, Areshia Arurashia) is the one who established Class Zero. Though she appears human, Arecia is a being who serves the deity Pulse and is responsible for the creation of Orience's crystals. Arecia's purpose was to use the powerful souls among Class Zero to locate Etro's Gate in an endless cycle of conflict, but the events of Type-0 have Arecia end the experiment and depart to points unknown. Before she leaves, she frees Machina and Rem from crystal stasis. Arecia is voiced by Eliza Jane Schneider in English and Atsuko Tanaka in Japanese.

=== Joker and Tiz ===
Joker (ジョーカー, Jōkā) and Tiz (ティス, Tisu) are supporting characters in Type-0. The two are unofficial members of Class Zero, acting as Arecia's agents. As revealed in Agito, their respective real names are Lean Hampelmann (リーン・ハンペルマン, Rīn Hanperuman) and Tohno Mahoroha (トオノ・マホロハ, Toono Mahoroha): Lean was allied with the Milites Empire as a scientist, while Tohno is an antisocial student at Akademeia. During the events of the final chapter of Orience's second cycle, Arecia chooses them to be her immortal agents, retaining their memories of each cycle. During Type-0, Tiz decides to use the accumulated memories of Orience's dead to convince Arecia to abandon the experiment. Joker is voiced by Adam McArthur in English and Kōki Uchiyama in Japanese, while Tiz is voiced by Chelsea Ricketts in English and Hitomi Terakado in Japanese.

=== Cid Aulstyne ===
Cid Aulstyne (シド・オールドスタイン, Shido Ōrudosutain) is Imperial Marshal of the Milites army, having become the empire's acting leader and the main antagonist of Type-0 and Agito. Seeing his people's prayers to the White Tiger Crystal go unanswered, he decided to oust the crystals and others related to the world's deities, bringing Orience under the rule of humans. Enacting a coup d'état against the Militesi Emperor, Cid appointed himself as the ruler of the Empire and took control of the White Tiger Crystal. When Tempus Finis arrives, Cid is confronted by Gala and chosen as the Rursan Arbiter, the being who carries out Gala's will. In a futile attempt to thwart Gala's plan, Cid kills himself. Resurrected by Gala as the Rursan Arbiter, he acts as the game's final antagonist, and is finally defeated by Class Zero. Cid is voiced by Steven Blum in English and Shuichiro Moriyama in Japanese.

=== Gala and Diva ===
Gala (ガーラ, Gāra) and Diva (ディーヴァ, Dīva) are minor characters related to the lore of Orience. Gala is a servant of the deity Lindzei and the leader of the Rursus: whenever the balance between Orience's nations is disrupted, he summons his army to slaughter the population. After Arecia abandons the experiment, he falls into a coma. He remains unnamed in the game, being referred to as "the Masked Man", but is named in the Ultimania guide book. Diva is the main narrator of Final Fantasy Type-0. Like Arecia and Gala, she is a being created by the world's deities: her duty is to watch over the world and record the events of each cycle. Diva is voiced by Fleur Saville in English and Maaya Sakamoto in Japanese.

=== Miyu Kagerohi ===
Miyu Kagerohi (ミユウ・カゲロヒ, Miyuu Kagerohi) is a supporting character from Final Fantasy Agito. A member of Class Second, she is the representative for the cadets in the Vermillion Peristylium. Her true identity, as revealed with the coming of Tempus Finis, is Myuria (ミューリア, Myūria), a servant of Gala who oversees the Rursan Army. Her defeat signals the coming of Tempus Finis, as the first cycle is deemed a failure. She later appears at the end of the second cycle, pondering with Arecia whether to continue with the experiment. She is voiced by Haruka Tomatsu in Japanese. Miyu as Myuria appears in concept art for Type-0, but was cut from the game.

== Other characters ==
=== Dominion of Rubrum ===
- Khalia Chival VI (カリヤ・シバル６世, Kariya Shibaru Rokusei) is a supporting character. He is the ruler of the Dominion of Rubrum and the 174th Director of the Vermillion Peristylium. Unlike most of the population of Orience, he is aware of both the nature of the crystals and Arecia's true form. Khalia is voiced by William Bassett in English and Iemasa Kayumi in Japanese.
- Izana Kunagiri (イザナ・クナギリ) is a minor supporting character and Machina's brother. Before the events of Type-0, he was the keeper of the Peristylium chocobo pens and a good friend of Ace. During the assault on the Vermillion Peristylium by Milites, he was sent through the midst of the battle on a mission by Arecia, causing his death. The circumstances behind his death eventually alienate Machina from Class Zero. Izana is voiced by Jason Spisak in English and Keiji Fujiwara in Japanese.
- The Cranberry Knights (クランベリーナイツ, Kuranberii Naitsu) are a group of thirteen moogles. In the world of Orience, the word "moogle" stands for Military Operation Organization Guidance Logistics Expert. One moogle is assigned to each class in the Peirstyrium. The one assigned to Class Zero, Moglin, gives the group missions across Orience (the game's version of side quests). In Agito, a moogle accompanies the Cadet through the Peirstyrium. Chiba was initially to have put in a sequence involving all members of the Knights, but he forgot. Moglin is voiced by Ariel Winter in English and Sumire Morohoshi in Japanese.
- Emina Hanaharu (エミナ・ハナハル) is a minor supporting character. A supervisor of Peristylium cadets, she was a friend of Kurasame and Kazusa during her time as a student. Over the course of the game, it is revealed that she is a spy from Milites who betrayed her handlers after growing to love the people of the academy. She is arrested by the forces of Rubrum as a potential spy and it is implied that she was executed for espionage. Emina is voiced by Ali Hillis in English and Rie Tanaka in Japanese.
- Kazusa Futahito (カヅサ・フタヒト) is a minor supporting character. A schoolfriend of Kurasame and Emina, he is a scientific researcher at the Vermillion Peirstyrium. Multiple times, he uses Class Zero to further his work, much to Kurasame's annoyance. After Kurasame's death, he uses a machine to recall memories of him, but neither Emina or Kazusa can remember him any more. He is one of the few senior Peristylium staff to survive Finis and help in Orience's reconstruction. Kazusa was scenario writer's Sarah Obake's favorite character in Type-0. He is voiced by Joel Johnstone in English and Akira Ishida in Japanese.
- Caetuna (セツナ, Setsuna) is a l'Cie of Rubrum and a minor supporting character. The oldest and one of the most powerful l'Cie in Orience, she specializes in summoning magic. During Rubrum's battle against the united forces of Milites and Concordia, she is deployed in a decisive battle to use her summoning skills. She summons the Verboten Eidolon Alexander with the help of sacrificed energy from Kurasame and other students. The summoning costs all of them, including Caetuna, their lives. Caetuna is voiced by Erin Cotrell in English and Marina Inoue in Japanese.
- Zhuyu Voghfau Byot (シュユ・ヴォーグフォウ・ビョウト, Shuyu Vōgufou Byouto) is a supporting character in Type-0. Often referred to as "Lord Zhuyu", he is a l'Cie of the Vermillion Bird crystal. During his time serving the crystal, he has been gradually losing his memories: to try to maintain some link to his past, he continues to wear his old Peristylium uniform. Zhuyu is voiced by Marc Worden in English and Hiroki Tōchi in Japanese.
- Naghi Minatsuchi (ナギ・ミナツチ, Nagi Minatsuchi): A bandana-wearing aloof cadet from Class Ninth who is a self-proclaimed idol and member of the Intelligence Club. He is voiced by Daniel Robaire in English and Showtaro Morikubo in Japanese.
- Carla Ayatsugi (カルラ・アヤツギ, Karura Ayatsugi): A fiery merchant girl from Class Second who offers items and information for outrageous prices. Because of her good grades, she is popular among the faculty. She is voiced by Danielle Judovits in English Aya Hirano in Japanese.
- Quon Yobatz (クオン・ヨバツ, Kuon Yobatsu): A magic researcher from Class Third who has no interest for common spells and is constantly looking for the ultimate magic. He is voiced by Chris Carmack in English Ryōtarō Okiayu in Japanese.
- Mutsuki Chiharano (ムツキ・チハラノ): Though Class Twelfth's genius inventor, her paranoia and skill in bomb making make her dangerous to even her peers. She is voiced by Cassandra Morris in English and Marika Matsumoto in Japanese.
- Ryid Uruk (リィド・ウルク, Riido Uruku): A member of Class Fifth, he is part Lorican on his mother's side and is the grandson of Enkidu. Due to his mixed heritage, he is destined to lose the ability to wield magic. He trains every day to use his strength to protect others. He is voiced by Travis Willingham in English Masahiro Kobayashi in Japanese.

=== Milites Empire ===
- Qator Bashar (カトル・バシュタル, Katoru Bashutaru) is a secondary antagonist. Second-in-command of the Milites Army, he is fiercely loyal to Cid. His primary weapon and means of transport is Gabriel, a flying magitek armor. He often takes part in battles, and consequently fights Class Zero. During Rubrum's final assault on Milites, Qator fights Class Zero again, but sacrifices himself to save Milites when he finds out an Ultima bomb is hidden inside Gabriel. Qator is voiced by Mark Hanson in English and Hideo Ishikawa in Japanese.
- Qun'mi Tru'e (クンミ・トゥルーエ, Kunmi Turūe) is a minor antagonist. A new l'Cie of the White Tiger crystal, she is given control of the Crystal Jammer mounted on the magitek armor Dainsleif. She faces off against Class Zero, and narrowly escapes after Dainsleif is destroyed. During a later mission, she is trapped in stone, managing to transfer her l'Cie powers to Machina before entering crystal stasis. Qun'mi is voiced by Aimée Castle in English and Megumi Toyoguchi in Japanese.
- Nimbus (ニンブス, Ninbusu) is a minor antagonist. A l'Cie of the White Tiger crystal, he has been in its service for a hundred years and has lost all purpose in life apart from obeying its commands. During Rubrum's efforts to repulse Milites, Nimbus and Zhuyu do battle, completely destroying a region of Rubrum. After bringing Cid to Pandaemonium, Nimbus vanishes to points unknown, but it is implied that, after the crystals lose power, he dies. Nimbus is voiced by Kyle Hebert in English and Junichi Suwabe in Japanese.

=== Kingdom of Concordia ===
- Andoria Kaya Tranka Fam Forturio (アンドリア・カヤ・トランカ・ファム・フォーチュリオ, Andoria Kaya Toranka Famu Fōchurio), often simply called "Queen Andoria", is the ruler of Concordia. In an effort to stop the war, she evokes the Fabula Pact, forcing a ceasefire. During the peace talks, Andoria is assassinated by Militessi and Concordian conspirators, resulting in Class Zero being framed for her murder. Andoria is voiced by Catherine Taber in English and Megumi Hayashibara.
- Claes Celestia Misca Sancest (クラエス・ホシヒメ・ミスカ・サンセスト, Kuraesu Hoshihime Misuka Sansesuto), often just called "Celestia", is a supporting character in Type-0, being a l'Cie of the Azure Dragon crystal. Celestia is voiced by Kim Mai Guest in English and Nana Mizuki in Japanese.
- The king of Concordia (蒼龍王, Sōryū-ō; lit. Blue Dragon King) is a supporting character in Type-0. Appointed after Andoria's death as part of a Milites puppet regime, he is a proud and selfish man who puts his own agenda before the welfare of Concordia. The king is voiced by Piotr Michael in English and Jun Fukuyama in Japanese.

=== Lorican Alliance ===
- Gilgamesh (ギルガメッシュ, Girugamesshu) is a supporting character and minor antagonist in Final Fantasy Type-0. Originally the king of the Lorican Alliance, he became a l'Cie of the Black Tortoise crystal and consequently began losing his memories, eventually forgetting his duty to the crystal. Gilgamesh is voiced by Keith Szarabajka in English and Kazuya Nakai in Japanese.
- Enkidu (エンキドゥ) is a minor supporting character in Final Fantasy Type-0. A childhood friend of and guide for Gilgamesh, he is a l'Cie of the Black Tortoise crystal. Enkidu is voiced by Liam O'Brien in English and Hiroshi Shirokuma in Japanese.

== Cultural impact ==
=== Merchandise ===
Characters from the game, including Ace, Mog, Machina and other members of Class Zero, appeared in the fourth series of releases for the Final Fantasy Trading Card Game. In November 2011, a manga adaptation of Type-0 began serialization. It is illustrated by Takatoshi Shiozawa and published in Young Gangan magazine. The manga has been collected into a tankōbon volume and was released on April 21, 2012. An English translation was released with the Collector's Edition of Type-0 HD in March 2015, exclusive to Square Enix's website. Another manga titled Final Fantasy Type-0 Side Story: Reaper of the Icy Blade (ファイナルファンタジー零式外伝 氷剣の死神, Fainaru Fantajī Reishiki Gaiden Hyouken no Shinigami) was also illustrated by Shiozawa, supervised by Tetsuya Nomura and published in Young Gangan magazine from April 2012. The manga ended in January 2014, with a bonus chapter being published in February. It was later released in five compiled volumes. Yen Press began distribution of the manga in the west in July 2015. Two novel adaptations were released by Square Enix in 2012. The first one, titled Final Fantasy Type-0: Change the World -The Answer- (ファイナルファンタジー零式 Change the World - The Answer-), was released on April 21. The second novel, titled Final Fantasy Type-0: Change the World 2 - The Penultimate Truth- (ファイナルファンタジー零式 Change the World 2 巻 -最後から二番目の真実-), was released on June 28. The novels depict an alternate version of Type-0's story.

=== Reception ===
The characters of Type-0 have so far received positive reception from video game critics in both local and import reviews. One of the reviewers for Famitsu magazine said that the large number of characters made the game "a very different Final Fantasy". RPG Site's Erren Van Duine was very impressed, saying that certain character interactions were "handled excellently" and that the players get a sense of specific character motivations because of it. He also praised the sympathetic portrayal of Cid Aulstyne, and stated that the game had "so many great moments, [the player will] have to experience each little detail for [themselves]". Heath Hindman, writing for PlayStation Lifestyle, called the characters "pretty strong overall", although she cited some scenes where various characters' inclusion felt like a necessity rather than a useful element to be a fault.

Western reception of the characters has been mixed. IGN's Meghan Sullivan said that the story's focus on young cadets sent into battle is a "reminder that it's the young who die in war, and who are the first to be forgotten". She also praised the comedic side characters, which helped strike a balance with the serious story. Game Informer's Matt Miller was fairly critical, saying that the abundance of main characters hampered character development, and found conversations "stilted and melodramatic". Alexa Ray Corriae of GameSpot was pleased with the main cast, enjoyed the romance between Rem and Machina, and praised the reactions of non-playable characters around the Peristylium to Class Zero's achievements during the story. Her main criticism was that she found the supporting cast fell short as the player often needed to remember faces only briefly seen before. Becky Cunningham of GamesRadar said that Class Zero's incerations with the story's political intrigues and interpersonal drama "make a story worth experiencing". GameTrailers' Michael Damiani felt that the character's "awkward" dialogue hampered the otherwise intriguing story, saying that the script relied too much on the player accepting leaps in logic on a character's say-so.

Mollie L. Patterson of Electronic Gaming Monthly enjoyed the game's fresh take on the high school setting so common in Japanese media, while PC Gamer's Samuel Roberts found the size of the cast hindered the story and compared the experience to a low-quality anime series. RPGamer's Michael A. Cunningham enjoyed the characters despite being shallow, with him saying Machina and Rem had the best development out of the main cast. Destructoid's Chris Carter said that, as with other Final Fantasy games, players would find favorites among the characters, and was entertained by the conflict between classes and classmates, which worked in the school setting. Most of the reviewers made mixed comments on the quality of the localization; Sullivan drew attention to Nine's incongruous addition of "yo" and "hey" to his sentences, Cunningham found the experience better when she switched to the Japanese voice track, while Cunningham appreciated the effort put into the translation while finding the final product inconsistent with the new platforms. The exception was Carter, who said that the English cast "do a great job".
