= Final Fantasy Awakening =

2016 role-playing video game

- Developers: Perfect World Games; Square Enix
- Publisher: Perfect World Games (Note: Perfect World handled publishing in Asian territories outside Japan. It was released in other territories by Efun (Malaysia and Singapore); and Oasis Games (English territories).)
- Directors: Hajime Tabata (2016-2018); Yoshinori Kitase (2019-2020)
- Producer: Daihashi Motohashi
- Series: Fabula Nova Crystallis; Final Fantasy
- Engine: Unity
- Platforms: Android; iOS
- Release: CHN: December 14, 2016; AU: January 30, 2018; US: February 2, 2018 (soft launch)
- Genre: Role-playing
- Mode: Multiplayer

Final Fantasy Awakening (Note: Fainaru Fantajī Kakusei (Japanese: ファイナルファンタジー覺醒), Chinese: 最终幻想 觉醒; pinyin: Zuì Zhōng Huànxiǎng Juéxǐng) was an action role-playing game developed by Perfect World Games and Square Enix for iOS and Android. It was first released in China by Perfect World in December 2016, with releases in other languages, including English, over the following two years from other publishers; its English release was the first Final Fantasy title to be licensed by Square Enix to another company. The English version closed in 2019 due to service changes, and all other versions shut down in May 2020 with the end of the licensing deal.

Awakening is set in the universe of Final Fantasy Type-0, a spin-off title within the Fabula Nova Crystallis subseries. Players took on the role of a cadet of the Dominion of Rubrum as the four nations of Orience are plunged into war. The players could engage in missions, fighting foes using hack and slash-style gameplay using parties of five characters. All gameplay was multiplayer-exclusive, featuring both cooperative and player-versus-player modes.

Planning began in 2014 after the online elements of Final Fantasy Agito stalled due to technical difficulties. According to original director Hajime Tabata, Awakening was the true realisation of his earliest plans for Type-0. The game was overseen by staff from Square Enix, while the main development was handled by Perfect World, who were chosen due to their good track record for domestic and international online games. First announced at the 2015 Tokyo Game Show, its first beta test opened in mainland China in April 2016. It met with commercial success, achieving two million downloads within its month of Chinese release. It also saw strong popular appeal and positive reviews from game journalists.

== Story and gameplay ==
Screenshot of combat in Final Fantasy Awakening, showing some of the potential characters in battle with some common enemies.

Final Fantasy Awakening is an action role-playing game where players could take on the role of a cadet in the Dominion of Rubrum's magical academy. Awakening takes place in Orience, a world divided between four warring nations. It is referred to as a "parallel world" to that of the original Type-0. Similar to Type-0 and Agito, the world is locked in a repeating spiral of history, with Awakening being an iteration of that history. The character takes part in the war between Orience's nations, eventually aiding Rubrum's victory over the other nations; this triggers an apocalyptic event called Tempus Finis. While the players could defeat the Rursan Judge overseeing Tempus Finis, the cycle of history is reset, though the player was allowed to remember their deeds and relives the cycle as different alliances of nations play out.

Awakening was focused around multiplayer gameplay similar to the multiplayer functions of the original Type-0, but with a more evolved system and hack-and-slash style gameplay. The players could customise the character, with gender, general appearance and abilities chosen by the player at the beginning of the game. Between the game's missions, represented as nodes on a map of Orience, the players could explore the hub area of Rubrum's Akademia, talking to characters and accepting quests. There was a manual control option and an "auto" mode where battles were played out using the game's artificial intelligence (AI). In addition to story-based missions, there were arenas where teams of players could face off against each other.

Missions used five-person teams; the cadet, two other player with selected characters, and two AI-controlled party members; the AI partners and players were swapped periodically to alter the flow of gameplay. This tied into a move called the Triad Manoeuvrer, where three characters combined abilities for high damage. If the player's Rage meter was high enough, they could call a summoned monster known as an Eidolon, which delivered high damage to enemies. Each character, including the original fourteen-person cast of Type-0, had specific skills and unique moves. Additional battle effects were unlocked by including characters in the party with close relationships or similar skills. Characters could earn experience points in battle, which both raised their level and earn in-game currency which could be used to purchase new weapons and items. The game used a free-to-play purchase model: while the base game was free, optional items were purchased for cash. Later updates included new battle areas, cross-server multiplayer battles between teams, and a "Vow" system where player characters could form marriages in-game.

== Development ==
Planning for Awakening began in November 2014, with full development starting at the beginning of 2015. The game was designed as a successor to Final Fantasy Agito, which had hit insurmountable technical barriers which stopped further development of its online functions. Type-0 Online, as it was called, was co-developed by Square Enix and Chinese online game developer Perfect World Games. While Perfect World handled primary development, the original staff of Agito supervised the project. Perfect World was chosen as they had extensive experience with domestic and international online games. After Agito was shut down, the development team transferred over to work on Awakening. Over 100 staff at Perfect World were attached to the game's development for more than a year. Development went on for longer than anticipated, although it progressed smoothly when it neared its first open beta. Awakening was the first Final Fantasy title to be licensed by Square Enix to another company for both production and publishing.

Hajime Tabata, who led production on both Type-0 and Agito, acted as the game's director. Following Tabata's departure from Square Enix in 2018, series veteran Yoshinori Kitase took over the position of director. The producer was Daihashi Motohashi. The game's title Awakening was chosen as Tabata considered the game an "awakening" of his early concept for Final Fantasy Type-0, which was planned as a mobile title before releasing on PlayStation Portable. He considered Awakening the closest realisation to his original plans. In an interview, Motohashi said that they faced multiple challenges during development, mainly how to bring the original game's features over into a mobile experience. They also wanted to make use of the original game's extensive cast, giving them a larger role in gameplay. The brand was already well known worldwide, so the gameplay was chosen as something acceptable to the largest number of people. It was built upon the Unity game engine. The logo's kanji was drawn by Yusuke Naora.

== Release ==
The game was first hinted with the announcement that Agito was shutting down in November 2015. The company stated that a "reborn" version of Agito would be shown off at that year's Tokyo Game Show. The game was revealed at the event under the provisional title Final Fantasy Type-0 Online for both mobiles and Microsoft Windows, along with a planned release window of spring 2016. At this time, it was planned for Agito players to receive an unspecified "favor" if they chose to play Awakening. A beta test was scheduled for Chinese territories in the winter of 2015. The first beta test ended up starting in mid-April 2016. When it was first announced, a localization for Europe and North America was under consideration. At the 2015 AWS Summit Tokyo, an open beta for Japan was announced for June, with releases following in Japan, North America and Europe.

Its first playable appearance was at the 2016 ChinaJoy Expo. It was also stated at the event that Perfect World would act as the game's publishers in Asian territories outside Japan. That October, the game was renamed as Final Fantasy Awakening, releasing under that name first in China. The game became available for general download in China on December 14 the same year. It was later released in Taiwan, Hong Kong and Macau on August 3, 2017. In these regions, the game was given a title in traditional Chinese rather than English, with the team hoping to establish a unified brand identity for Final Fantasy in the region. Any Japanese release was being delayed until the game had a stable presence in the worldwide market.

In the same year, the game was released in Indonesia on August 15 by Efun Company Limited. Releases in Singapore and Malaysia followed in October. A South Korean release came through FL Studio Mobile on October 17. Later, Hong Kong-based company Oasis Games officially licensed the game for an English-language release in Australia, New Zealand, and other territories in 2018. First releasing for Android in those regions on January 30, a release for iOS came out on February 26. A soft launch went live in North America on February 2 for Android and February 26 for iOS. The game's English servers were shut down on October 31, 2019, by Oasis Games due to incompatible changes to the original service. Final Fantasy Awakening as a whole was shut down on May 18, 2020, with gradual suspension of services between February and April. In a statement regarding the game's closure, Efun said it was due to the approaching end of the licensing agreement with Square Enix.

== Reception ==
On the day of its release in China, Awakening achieved 500,000 downloads, coming in at #5 in the best-selling mobile games in China at the time. By the end of December, downloads had reached two million. Following its English release on Android, the game achieved 137,000 downloads. It also received positive player feedback, and was awarded Google's "Best of 2017" award in three territories where it had released at the time.

Website GamerBraves praised the game for its nostalgic return to the world of Type-0 and engaging gameplay style, but faulted its cluttered interface and lack of some player-versus-player battle arena types. GameAxis called it "a worthwhile entry for players hungry for Type-0 content", praising its gameplay but faulting its inclusion of microtransactions. Geek Culture again praised the gameplay and positively compared its cinematic presentation to home console games, but again negatively noted the presence of microtransactions despite the reviewer not feeling pressured into using them.
