= Takeharu Ishimoto =

Japanese composer and musician (born 1970)

- Born: May 29, 1970 (age 55); Nichinan, Miyazaki, Japan
- Genres: Video game music; rock; hip hop; pop; electronica
- Occupations: Composer; musician
- Instruments: Piano; guitar
- Years active: 1998–present
- Labels: THRILL

Takeharu Ishimoto (石元 丈晴, Ishimoto Takeharu, born May 29, 1970) is a Japanese video game composer and musician. Formerly employed by Square Enix, he joined them in 1999 as a synthesizer programmer on Legend of Mana, working for them on several games. In 2002, he was promoted to the role of composer, beginning with World Fantasista, and composed for several large-budget games, such as The World Ends with You, the Final Fantasy series, and the Kingdom Hearts series. In addition to his work for Square Enix, he is a composer and guitar player for the band The Death March. He left Square Enix at the end of 2017, becoming a freelancer.

== Biography ==
According to Ishimoto, he first got into music due to living in the country, where there was nothing else to do. He first worked as a synthesizer programmer, beginning with Legend of Mana in 1999, before becoming a composer starting with the PlayStation 2 soccer game World Fantasista. In 2004, he began to compose for games in the Final Fantasy series, which he had previously worked on as a synthesizer programmer for Final Fantasy X. His last work as a synthesizer programmer was for Kingdom Hearts II in 2005; since then, he worked exclusively for Square Enix as a composer.

Ishimoto was also a member of the Japanese musical group SAWA, which he formed along with Sawa Kato in October 2008, performing with the group under the name HIZMI. Kato sang some of SAWA's songs, also writing lyrics on Ishimoto's soundtrack for The World Ends with You. The band released an album, 333, in 2008. After SAWA disbanded, in 2012 Ishimoto formed The Death March, a band that played and re-arranged music from soundtracks composed by him. In December 2017, Ishimoto announced that he would be leaving Square Enix and becoming a freelancer. Ishimoto stated that the decision to leave was his own, leaving on amicable terms with the company.

== Style and legacy ==
Ishimoto was named by IGN as number ten in a list of the top ten JRPG composers in 2008. Ishimoto composes songs in many different genres, including rock, hip hop, electronica, and pop.

== Works ==
Year	Title	Role	Ref.
1999	Legend of Mana	Synthesizer programmer	
1999	Front Mission 3	Synthesizer programmer	
2000	Vagrant Story	Synthesizer programmer	
2000	All Star Pro-Wrestling	Synthesizer programmer	
2001	Final Fantasy X	Synthesizer programmer	
2001	All Star Pro-Wrestling II	Synthesizer programmer	
2002	World Fantasista	Music with Masayoshi Soken	
2003	All Star Pro-Wrestling III	Synthesizer programmer	
2004	Before Crisis: Final Fantasy VII	Music	
2004	Kingdom Hearts: Chain of Memories	Synthesizer programmer	
2005	Last Order: Final Fantasy VII	Music	
2005	Kingdom Hearts II	Synthesizer programmer	
2007	Monotone	Music	
2007	The World Ends with You	Music	
2007	Crisis Core: Final Fantasy VII	Music	
2008	Dissidia Final Fantasy	Music	
2010	Kingdom Hearts Birth by Sleep	Music with Yoko Shimomura and Tsuyoshi Sekito	
2011	Dissidia 012 Final Fantasy	Music	
2011	Final Fantasy Type-0	Music	
2012	Kingdom Hearts 3D: Dream Drop Distance	Music with Yoko Shimomura and Tsuyoshi Sekito	
2014	Final Fantasy Agito	Music	
2015	Final Fantasy Type-0 HD	Music	
2015	Rampage Land Rankers	Music	
2015	Dissidia Final Fantasy	Music with Keiji Kawamori and Tsuyoshi Sekito	
2018	Dissidia Final Fantasy NT	Music	
2019	Kingdom Hearts III	Music with Yoko Shimomura and Tsuyoshi Sekito	
2021	The World Ends with You: The Animation	Music	
2021	Neo: The World Ends with You	Music	
2022	Crisis Core: Final Fantasy VII Reunion	Arrangements	
2024	Tsurugihime	Music	
2025	BLEACH Rebirth of Souls	Music	
