= Final Fantasy Type-0 =

2011 video game

- Developer: Square Enix 1st Production Department
- Publisher: Square Enix
- Director: Hajime Tabata
- Producer: Yoshinori Kitase
- Artists: Yusuke Naora; Yusaku Nakaaki; Tetsuya Nomura
- Writers: Hiroki Chiba; Sara Okabe; Hajime Tabata
- Composer: Takeharu Ishimoto
- Series: Fabula Nova Crystallis; Final Fantasy
- Platform: PlayStation Portable
- Release: JP: October 27, 2011
- Genre: Action role-playing
- Modes: Single-player, multiplayer

Final Fantasy Type-0 (Note: Japanese: ファイナルファンタジー零式, Hepburn: Fainaru Fantajī Reishiki) is a 2011 action role-playing game developed and published by Square Enix for the PlayStation Portable (PSP). Released in Japan on October 27, 2011, Type-0 is part of the Fabula Nova Crystallis subseries, a set of games sharing a common mythos which includes Final Fantasy XIII and XV. The gameplay, similar to Crisis Core: Final Fantasy VII, has the player taking control of characters in real-time combat during missions across Orience. The player also engages in large-scale strategy-based battles on the world map, and has access to a multiplayer option during story missions and side quests.

The story focuses on Class Zero, a group of fourteen students from the Vermillion Peristylium, a magical academy in the Dominion of Rubrum. When the Militesi Empire launches an assault on the other Crystal States of Orience, seeking to control their respective crystals, Class Zero is mobilized for the defense of Rubrum. Eventually, the group becomes entangled in the secrets behind both the war and the reason for their existence. The setting and presentation were inspired by historical documentaries, and the story itself was written to be darker than other Final Fantasy titles.

The game was originally announced as a title for mobile phones and the PSP called Final Fantasy Agito XIII. (Note: ファイナルファンタジーアギトXIII, Fainaru Fantajī Agito Sātīn) It was directed by Hajime Tabata, who took up the project after completing Before Crisis: Final Fantasy VII. Initially designed to provide players with easy access to the Fabula Nova Crystallis universe, the mobile version was eventually cancelled and the game's title was changed to distance it from the subseries' flagship title Final Fantasy XIII. Releasing to strong sales, it received praise for its story and gameplay, but was criticized for its camera control and artificial intelligence. Further games related to Type-0 have also been developed, including a high definition remaster that was released internationally in March 2015.

== Gameplay ==
Final Fantasy Type-0 is an action role-playing game in which the player controls the 14 members of Class Zero, who are sent on missions across Orience. Outside environments such as the Vermillion Peristylium (Class Zero's home base) and dedicated missions, the game world of Orience is navigated via a scaled-down world map. Class Zero is sent on missions across Orience during the course of the game. The player initially travels to preset destinations in the world on an airship supplied by the Peristylium, but gains their own airship to freely navigate the world map after defeating a powerful enemy guarding it. The main gameplay is presented in a mission-based structure. The two types of missions encountered are story-based missions, and "Practice" missions, which act as side-quests. During missions, optional orders are issued which can be obeyed or ignored as the player chooses. Should they be accepted, the characters receive a temporary power boost, and completing the objectives yields rewards. Players can also engage in real-time strategy battles on the world map, with the player taking control of allied military divisions. Missions involve liberating cities and towns from enemy forces. Timed aerial missions are also available where the characters shoot down attacking dragons using their airship's weapons.

While outside combat, players can breed chocobos, recurring galliform birds in the Final Fantasy series. Players must capture two chocobos on the world map and take them to a special ranch within the Peristylium: by pairing certain chocobos and adding specific items, a special chocobo can be bred for use. Players can visit the Peristylium Crystarium to review defeated enemies, character information, in-game lore and special video clips. Moogles, another recurring creature in the series, hand out missions to the player: the objectives of missions can change during gameplay. Items and new equipment can be bought from shops managed by non-player characters (NPCs) both within the Peristylium and across Orience. Towns liberated during missions give access to a wider range of shops. After completing the game once, players unlock a "New Game+" option: in this mode, players keep their stats and weapons from the previous playthrough, while also unlocking story scenes and character-specific missions. Type-0 features three difficulty levels: "normal", "hard", and "impossible".

=== Battle system ===
Screenshot of combat in Final Fantasy Type-0, showing characters Ace, Machina and Rem in combat with one of the game's common enemies.

Type-0 uses a real-time, action-based battle system similar to the system used in Crisis Core: Final Fantasy VII. The player is allowed access to three characters, which they can swap between at any time. The two not being controlled are managed by the game's artificial intelligence. Each character has a specific weapon, and special attacks unique to a character are unlocked as they gain experience levels. During combat, characters lock onto targets while attacking and can switch targets. Characters are able to perform precisely timed attacks during the period when an enemy unit is attacking: the "Break Sight", which deals high damage, and the "Kill Sight", which kills a standard enemy with a single hit. Three characters can also be commanded to use a Triad Maneuver, (Note: 三位一体, Sanmi Ittai; "Trinity Attack") combining their attacks to deal higher damage to a target. Aside from human enemies, the game features multiple recurring Final Fantasy monsters. In addition to enemies encountered in missions, there are special enemies that can be encountered while exploring the world map.

Defeated enemy units drop a substance called Phantoma. The color of Phantoma indicates what aspect of the character it will replenish, though in general they automatically replenish a set number of magic points. Phantoma are used in the game's leveling system, the Altocrystarium, to strengthen a character's magic skills. The game's magic skills are divided into five basic groups named after types of guns: for example, "Rifle" fires the spell in a straight line, while "Missile" homes in on and chases targeted enemies. Holding down the assigned action button increases the power of the attack. Many combat situations involve timed challenges. Success rewards the character, while failure drains their health. If a character is defeated in battle, the player can instantly select another to replace it, and the defeated character must be revived outside the mission. The game features an arena where practice fights take place. While these fights are not against real foes, the characters continue to level up and gain Phantoma after the battle, and twenty battles can be arranged at any one time. Each character has access to summoned monsters called Eidolons, (Note: 軍神, Gunshin; "War Gods") which act as temporary playable characters and have their own set of skills. Summoning them empties the selected character's health gauge, removing them from battle until they are revived. Summons are also affected by the current environment: as an example, Shiva's powers are stronger in snowy weather. After a limited time in battle, the Eidolons are dismissed. Those available to players are series staples Shiva, Ifrit, Golem, Odin, Diablos and Bahamut. Each Eidolon has variants of its original form, many of which are unlocked as the game progresses.

Characters can continue to level up through activities within the Peristylium while the PSP is in sleep mode, the game's UMD is running, and the PSP is charging. The multiplayer function, activated through the game's configuration screen, allows two other players to jump into another host player's game via an online connection. The allotted time for multiplayer is limited to a few minutes, with transitions between zones triggering the end of a multiplayer section. The time limit can be extended by players helping their current host. The first and last segments of the game are not open to multiplayer. There is also a function called Magical Academy Assist, in which NPCs named after members of the game's production team are summoned into battle to assist the cadets.

== Synopsis ==
Note: The plot of Type-0 is the same in its original version and the high-definition remaster Final Fantasy Type-0 HD, so the terms and quotes used in the text are from the localization of the high-definition remaster rather than unofficial translations.

=== Setting ===
Final Fantasy Type-0 is set within Orience, a land divided between four nations or "Crystal States". Each nation has crystals of power based on the Four Symbols, which are in turn their national emblems. The Dominion of Rubrum uses the Vermillion Bird Crystal, which controls magic; the Milites Empire controls the White Tiger Crystal, containing the power of science and weapons; the Kingdom of Concordia uses the Azure Dragon Crystal, containing the power of Dragons; and the Lorican Alliance is home to the Black Tortoise Crystal, containing the power of shielding. Each nation has an academy, or Peristylium, to research and protect the country's respective crystal. The crystals have the ability to mark humans as their countries' servants. These servants, called l'Cie, are branded with a symbol and are given a "Focus", a task to complete. While blessed with long life and the ability to transform into crystal, l'Cie are cursed to lose their memories over time. The people of Orience also lose their memories of the dead so they will not be held back by any past regrets and continue strengthening their souls through conflict, a mechanism put in place by the crystals for the convenience of the deities who crafted them. The main aim of many characters is to become Agito, a legendary figure who will appear and save the world from Tempus Finis, an apocalyptic event that will destroy Orience.

=== Characters ===
The main characters of Final Fantasy Type-0 are Class Zero, an elite group of 14 students from the Vermillion Peristylium. The first 12 are card wielder Ace, flute wielder Deuce, the archer Trey, magic-gun wielder Cater, the mace-wielding Cinque, scythe wielder Sice, whip wielder Seven, martial artist Eight, spearman Nine, katana wielding Jack, swordswoman Queen and dual pistol wielding King. The last two, Machina Kunagiri and Rem Tokimiya, double as narrators and the focus for the game's main subplot. Supporting Class Zero are their mentor Kurasame Susaya, and Arecia Al-Rashia, Class Zero's former mentor and the overseer for magical development at the Vermillion Peristylium. Other important characters from Rubrum are Khalia Chival VI, the current leader of Rubrum and headmaster of the Vermillion Peristyrium, and the l'Cie Caetuna. Multiple Militesi figures, led by Marshal Cid Aulstyne, act as the game's main antagonists. Other important characters include the Concordian queen Andoria, Gala, leader of the Rursus Army and the instigator of Tempus Finis, and Joker and Tiz, two mysterious figures who observe the events of the game.

=== Plot ===
Marshal Cid Aulstyne leads the army of Milites against the other nations of Orience, launching a devastating attack against the Vermillion Peristylium and neutralising the Vermillion Bird Crystal using a crystal jammer. Class Zero, immune to the effects of the jammer, repel the invasion. During the conflict Izana Kunagiri, Machina's older brother, is killed while on a mission for Class Zero. This event later creates a rift between Machina and Class Zero. Coordinated by Kurasame and Arecia Al-Rashia, Class Zero plays a key role in freeing Rubrum's territories and launching counterattacks in alliance with Concordia, while Lorica's capital is destroyed by a Militesi bomb. Andoria, Concordia's queen, then forces a ceasefire between the remaining nations. During peace talks in the Militesi capital, Class Zero is framed for Andoria's murder, resulting in Concordia's puppet government and Milites launching a united assault on Rubrum. During their flight, Machina storms off after clashing with Class Zero, and becomes a White Tiger l'Cie to protect Rem from his brother's fate before returning to them. The White Tiger Crystal's will eventually forces him to leave.

With help from its l'Cie soldiers and Class Zero, Rubrum destroys the forces of Concordia and Milites, uniting Orience under its flag. This triggers the arrival of Tempus Finis, with the Rursus Army emerging from the magical fortress Pandaemonium to wipe out Orience's population. Cid and Class Zero each travel to Pandaemonium: Cid attempts to become Agito and is transformed into the Rursus Arbiter by Gala, while Class Zero resolve to halt Tempus Finis. As Class Zero face the Arbiter's trials, the Vermillion Bird Crystal offers them the chance to become l'Cie. During the original playthrough, if Class Zero accepts the offer, they go into battle against the Rursus and die, dooming Orience to be destroyed in Tempus Finis.

Class Zero refuse the Crystal's offer and Rem is made a l'Cie in their place. Machina and Rem end up fighting each other in Pandaemonium: Rem is mortally wounded, and she and Machina turn to crystal. Weakened by the trials, Class Zero are initially unable to defeat the Arbiter. Machina and Rem's spirits give them the strength they need to defeat the Arbiter and halt Tempus Finis. Fatally injured, Class Zero spend their final minutes imagining their possible post-war lives. They are found by Machina and Rem, who have returned to human form and, along with the rest of Orience, are allowed to remember the dead. In a post-credits sequence, it is said that the Crystal States fall into turmoil as the Crystals lose their powers. Machina and Rem unite Orience and rebuild the world, and Machina records Class Zero's history before dying with Rem at his side.

A second playthrough reveals that Orience is trapped in a stable time loop created by Arecia and Gala, the respective servants of the deities Pulse and Lindzei, as part of an experiment to find the gateway to the Unseen Realm. Competing with each other to open the gateway using a different method, both failed and reset the world for another attempt. By the events of Type-0, the experiment had been performed over six hundred million times. Cid, aware of the cycle, wanted to free Orience from the Crystals' control, and killed himself in an unsuccessful attempt to prevent Gala from using him. In a sequence unlocked during the second playthrough, Joker and Tiz speak with Arecia after the Arbiter's defeat and show her the memories of Class Zero and the people of Orience to make her reconsider restarting the experiment. After speaking with Machina and Rem, Arecia decides to abandon the experiment and returns the two to human form. In an alternate ending, Arecia chooses to remove the crystals from Orience's history, creating a new timeline where the war never occurred and the world's population can live happily.

== Development ==
Final Fantasy Type-0 was originally titled Final Fantasy Agito XIII, envisioned as a game for mobile devices. It was conceived in 2005 as part of Fabula Nova Crystallis Final Fantasy, a subseries of Final Fantasy games linked by a common mythos. Agito XIII was the final original Fabula Nova Crystallis game to be created. The decision to make it a mobile game was based on the popularity of Before Crisis: Final Fantasy VII. Hajime Tabata, who contributed to the Fabula Nova Crystallis mythos, was searching for a new project after finishing Before Crisis and became the game's director. Before Crisis producer Kosei Ito acted as producer before his move to Capcom prior to 2009. Beginning development in 2006, the game was first announced at that year's Electronic Entertainment Expo (E3). It was said to offer on-the-go access to the Fabula Nova Crystallis universe, using gameplay functions exclusive to mobile phones of the time. The concept was to deliver a game for mobile platforms equivalent to a console game from the main Final Fantasy series, and to make it available in its entirety upon release rather than in episodic format.

Developers had been planning a release on the next generation of mobile phones, as those available at the time could not offer all the capabilities they would need. While it was originally claimed to be a mobile exclusive, versions for both mobiles and the PlayStation Portable were being developed, with the latter to be revealed when the former was sufficiently advanced. The original staff members were Tabata, Yusuke Naora and Tetsuya Nomura. Nomura acted as a character designer and creative producer. Between 2006 and 2008, development wavered between inactivity and sluggishness since most of the team was devoted to Crisis Core: Final Fantasy VII. In 2008, it was said to be facing serious problems due to the scale of the project. An issue developers had grappled with was whether or not to make the command buttons used in the game visible on the mobile screen. Agito XIII was described as an online RPG using fully rendered 3D graphics similar to console games, as well as having gameplay elements from multiple genres such as MMORPGs, smaller-scale multiplayer-focused games, and standard role-playing games. Other unfinished concepts being developed were a day-night cycle, a calendar system linked to real-world time and dates, and a story influenced by player votes.

In 2008, Type-0 became a PSP exclusive, cancelling the mobile version of the game as the developers did not want to wait for mobile technology to reach a level which could handle their full vision for the game. Full development began that year by the same team who developed Crisis Core, but was again slowed as most of them were completing work on The 3rd Birthday. Because of these conflicting projects, Type-0 came close to being cancelled outright. Between 2009 and 2011, the title was changed to distance it from Final Fantasy XIII, since after the platform change the two games had little in common other than their shared mythos. One of the titles considered and rejected was Final Fantasy Live, referring to the game's multiplayer element. The new title, Final Fantasy Type-0, was intended to indicate the game's separation from the main series. It was also the beginning of an alternative numbering system parallel to the main series. The game made its first official public appearance under the new title at the Square Enix 1st Production Department Premier in Tokyo, along with a new trailer that was released to the public in January 2011.

=== Scenario and design ===
Artwork representing the themes and atmosphere of Type-0. The artwork was created by the game's art director Yusuke Naora, who drew on personal experience and the game's themes of war and death.

Type-0's scenario was conceived by Tabata and written by Hiroki Chiba and Sara Okabe. While the game was still titled Agito XIII, Tabata described it as "a major title [...] formed from a variety of concepts" which included the collision of four fantasies (the game's view of Orience), a battle between magic and weapons, and the two sides of reality. The early story concept drew heavily from popular manga and anime, but little survived after the platform change. Tabata instead chose a new style similar to historical films and documentaries. The new story's concept started with the idea of a war story told by young people caught up in the event, with its story themes revolving around death and its impact on others. A major inspiration was the Japanese documentary series Centuries of Picture. The final story was darker than many other Final Fantasy games. Despite its title change, the game was kept within the Fabula Nova Crystallis mythos. The approach taken with the mythos was to portray the roles of its deities from a historical standpoint, while telling a story focused on the human side of events. The cyclic nature of the game's universe was created to help incorporate aspects of the mythos. The roles and backgrounds for each character in the game were conceived and put into place after the setting and main story had been finalized. After the game's release, Tabata commented that when he was writing the story he would have liked to have been more thorough, and to have made the story easier for players to understand.

The game's logo artwork was drawn by regular series artist Yoshitaka Amano. The kanji symbol used in the logo was drawn by Naora, who had designed the Shinra logo in Final Fantasy VII and its companion media. Naora specifically requested that he draw the logo due to this previous experience. To achieve the grittier atmosphere, Naora took a research trip to a Japanese military camp to learn what being a military cadet was like. The island of the Vermillion Perystilium was based on an offshore Japanese island he had visited prior to his involvement with the game, adding elements in-game such as an offshore ship wreck to symbolize his fear of the sea. He was also influenced by an incident where he saw a dead cat surrounded by other cats to portray the bond between members of Class Zero, and the game's themes, in promotional artwork. The CGI cutscenes and some promotional art was created by Square Enix's in-house Visual Works studio.

The gameplay was inspired by the multi-character system of Before Crisis, while the naming of magic styles after weapons of war made reference to first-person shooters. The combat was designed to be filled with tension and portray each playable character's personality on the battlefield. The Eidolons were originally not controlled in realtime, but during the development of Ifrit, Tabata did some testing with real-time commands. The results impressed him enough that he decided to overcome the technical difficulties involved and make the Eidolons controllable. Due to technical restrictions and the presence of the Academy Assist function, the game's artificial intelligence for playable characters needed to be limited to healing, survival and other minor actions. The game's multiplayer was deliberately designed around restricted segments. Its development was still ongoing during the summer of 2011, with a temporary stoppage of PlayStation Network that year negatively affecting its development. Because of the size of the project, debugging the game took far longer than anticipated. Between the release of the demo and the full game, adjustments were made to gameplay mechanics and the in-game camera. In a post-release interview, Tabata commented that he would have liked to expand the multiplayer functions to include an ad-hoc function and expanded cooperative gameplay, and create a more forgiving learning curve for players.

=== Music ===
Final Fantasy Type-0 Original Soundtrack

Soundtrack album by Takeharu Ishimoto & Nobuo Uematsu
- Released: October 26, 2011
- Genre: Video game soundtrack
- Length: Disc 1: 56:54; Disc 2: 1:04:21; Disc 3: 1:07:34; Total: 3:09:02
- Label: Square Enix
- Producer: Takeharu Ishimoto

The music for Type-0 was composed by Takeharu Ishimoto. He had previously composed the music for Before Crisis, Crisis Core and The World Ends with You. Ishimoto gave the music a dark and heavy feel, describing the themes as "war, life, and death". He used less rock elements than in his previous games to promote a feeling of immersion. One of his primary instruments was the guitar, which Ishimoto played himself during recording sessions. Although the title was for the PSP, the team did not want to hold back despite hardware limitations, recording a quantity of tracks unusual for a spin-off Final Fantasy title. Wherever possible, the recording was done live. The orchestral and choral elements were performed by the Sydney Symphony Orchestra and the Cantillation chamber choir, and the recording and mixing of these tracks was done at the Sydney Opera House. Recording for other tracks was done at Ishimoto's studio in Japan. After recording, Ishimoto combined the orchestral and choral elements, and rearranged the main leitmotifs to create more variety in the score. Arrangements for the orchestral tunes were done by Kentaro Sato, while arrangements for other tracks were done by Rieko Mikoshiba.

The game's theme song, "Zero", was composed and performed by Japanese rock band Bump of Chicken. The band, which was a big fan of the Final Fantasy series, was contacted by Square Enix to compose and perform the song and agreed readily. It was brought in after the platform move onto the PSP, but while the game was still titled Agito XIII. While looking for inspiration, the band was able to see in-development screenshots of the game, samples of the script, and character illustrations. The band was mostly given a free hand while composing the song. Its one guideline was provided by Tabata, who suggested the theme song for Centuries of Picture, "Is Paris Burning?" by Takeshi Kako, as a source of inspiration. Multiple versions of "Zero" were composed for use in different areas of the game. At the request of band leader Motoo Fujiwara, Amano's logo artwork was used for the cover of the single's limited edition.

Final Fantasy Type-0 Original Soundtrack was released on October 26, 2011. The soundtrack was released in a standard edition, as well as a limited edition that could be purchased both separately and with the collector's edition of the game. A promotional album featuring five tracks was sold by Square Enix at their booth at the Odaiba Expo 2011. The album stayed on the Oricon charts for seven weeks, reaching a high of #25. The soundtrack has received positive reviews in the west from dedicated music outlets Original Sound Version and Game-OST, with the sites giving both individual tracks and the work in general high praise. "Zero" was released on October 19 the same year. It was released as a single instead of being part of the main soundtrack, receiving both a limited and standard edition. The single remained in the Oricon charts for thirty-two weeks, peaking at #2.

==== Track listings ====
Literal translation of the original titles appear in (brackets) if different

Disc 1
No.	Title	Japanese title (Romanization)	Length
1.	"Tempus Bellum" ("Time of the Foundation")	開闢の刻 (Kaibyaku no Koku)	1:52
2.	"We Have Come"	我ら来たれり (Warera Kitareri)	4:31
3.	"Guided Conclusion"	導かれる結論 (Michibikareru Ketsuron)	1:06
4.	"Three Hours That Changed the World" ("Three Hours of Fate")	運命の三時間 (Unmei no Sanjikan)	4:04
5.	"Wings of Fire"	炎の翼 (Honō no Tsubasa)	3:17
6.	"Horror of the Abyss"	深淵の恐怖 (Shin'en no Kyōfu)	2:55
7.	"Divine Fire"	浄火 (Jōka)	2:08
8.	"Arms of Steel"	鋼の腕 (Hagane no Ude)	3:57
9.	"War: Warrior Worth a Thousand" ("Battle – Mighty Warrior")	戦－一騎当千 (Ikusa – Ikkitousen)	2:39
10.	"Servant of the Crystal"	クリスタルの使徒 (Kurisutaru no Shito)	2:31
11.	"Choosing How to Die"	死に方の選び方 (Shinikata no Erabikata)	3:39
12.	"Arecia Al-Rashia"	アレシア・アルラシア (Areshia Arurashia)	3:27
13.	"Crystal Guide Us" ("Divine Protection of the Crystal")	クリスタルの加護 (Kurisutaru no Kago)	3:04
14.	"Time of Tranquility"	静謐な時間 (Seihitsu na Jikan)	3:06
15.	"Moglin"	もぐりん (Mogurin)	2:04
16.	"Erased Memories"	消えた記憶 (Kieta Kioku)	2:41
17.	"A Day Like Any Other"	とある日の日常 (Toaru Hi no Nichijō)	2:48
18.	"Machina Kunagiri"	マキナ・クナギリ (Makina Kunagiri)	2:48
19.	"War: Unseen Peace"	戦－目に見えぬ平和 (Ikusa – Me ni Mienu Heiwa)	4:17

Disc 2
No.	Title	Japanese title (Romanization)	Length
1.	"Show of Power"	示される力 (Shimesareru Chikara)	3:11
2.	"Untainted Eyes"	穢れなき瞳 (Kegarenaki Hitomi)	3:35
3.	"Rem Tokimiya"	レム・トキミヤ (Remu Tokimiya)	3:26
4.	"The Forlorn Heart"	寂しき心 (Sabishiki Kokoro)	2:31
5.	"That Which Quivers"	蠢くもの (Ugomeku Mono)	3:30
6.	"Raise the Vermillion Banner" ("When the Suzaku Flag Stands")	朱雀の旗が立つとき (Suzaku no Hata ga Tatsu Toki)	4:10
7.	"The Heart Boils" ("Seething Heart")	滾る心 (Tagiru Kokoro)	2:46
8.	"The Earth Under Our Feet" ("Standing Strong on the Ground")	踏みしめる大地 (Fumishimeru Daichi)	2:00
9.	"Chocobo!"	チョコボ! (Chocobo!)	1:22
10.	"War: Recapture" ("Battle – The Strategy for Recapture")	戦－奪還作戦 (Ikusa – Dakkan Sakusen)	3:57
11.	"War: That Which Stands in the Way"	戦－立ち塞がるもの (Ikusa – Tachifusagaru Mono)	2:49
12.	"White Thunder" ("White Lightning")	白き雷 (Shiroki Kaminari)	4:34
13.	"War: The White Weapon"	戦－白の兵器 (Ikusa – Shiro no Heiki)	3:16
14.	"Kind Tears"	優しき涙 (Yasashiki Namida)	3:43
15.	"War: Life of Darkness"	戦－暗き生 (Ikusa – Kuraki Sei)	3:58
16.	"War: That Which Lurks"	戦－潜むもの (Ikusa – Hisomu Mono)	4:08
17.	"War: Breaking Through"	戦－突破 (Ikusa – Toppa)	4:36
18.	"War: Howl of the Dreadnought"	戦－弩級の響き (Dokyū no Hibiki)	2:55
19.	"The Vanishing Soul"	消えゆく心 (Kieyuku Kokoro)	3:54

Disc 3
No.	Title	Japanese title (Romanization)	Length
1.	"The Azure Spirit" ("Blue Soul")	蒼き魂 (Aoki Tamashī)	3:11
2.	"Swaying Thoughts"	揺蕩う想い (Tayutau Omoi)	4:09
3.	"War: Pursuit"	戦－追撃 (Ikusa – Tsuigeki)	3:54
4.	"Human Strengths and Weaknesses"	人の弱さと強さ (Hito no Yowasa to Tsuyosa)	3:38
5.	"Your History and Fate"	自らの歴史と運命 (Mizukara no Rekishi to Unmei)	2:44
6.	"Soar" ("Fly in the Sky")	空翔る (Sora Kakeru)	2:48
7.	"War: The Quiet Bloodbath" ("Battle – Peaceful Fighting")	戦－静かな激闘 (Ikusa – Shizuka na Gekitō)	2:17
8.	"War: Depths of Naraku"	戦－ナラクの底 (Ikusa – Naraku no Soko)	3:16
9.	"Machina Kunagiri" (arrangement)	マキナ・クナギリ／arrange version (Makina Kunagiri/arrange version)	2:32
10.	"Rem Tokimiya" (arrangement)	レム・トキミヤ／arrange version (Remu Tokimiya/arrange version)	2:44
11.	"War: The Quiet Bloodbath (Long)" ("Battle – Peaceful Fighting/long version")	戦－静かな激闘／long version (Ikusa – Shizuka na Gekitō/long version)	3:56
12.	"Tempus Finis" ("The Time of Finis")	フィニスの刻 (Finis no Koku)	2:53
13.	"Machina and Rem"	マキナとレム (Makina to Rem)	5:08
14.	"Tempus Ratio" ("The Time of Judgement")	裁きの刻 (Sabaki no Koku)	4:22
15.	"Vermillion Fire" ("The Fires of Suzaku")	朱雀の炎 (Suzaku no Honō)	3:05
16.	"Type Zero" ("Type-0")	零式 (Reishiki)	7:55
17.	"Silence"	未定 (Silence)	4:32
18.	"Colorful – Falling in Love"	カラフルフォーリンラブ (Colorful Fall in Love)	4:30
19.	"Colorful – Falling in Love" (karaoke)	カラフルフォーリンラブ／カラオケ (Colorful Fall in Love/karaoke)	4:30

== Release ==
Type-0 was released on October 27, 2011, receiving both physical and digital releases. It was initially announced for release in summer of that year, but unspecified difficulties with development including the stoppage of PlayStation Network caused a delay. The game was then scheduled for October 13 release, but was delayed by two weeks. While Square Enix stated it wanted to improve its quality, no other information was given. It was speculated to be due to complaints surrounding the camera control and other gameplay elements. The releases of the soundtrack and the theme song were also delayed. Type-0 was one of a few releases for the PSP to be released on two UMDs, as Tabata wanted to cut as little content as possible, which would have been impossible if they had settled for using one UMD. A demo for the original game was released in August the same year, featuring seven playable characters and four missions at locked difficulty levels. Save data could be transferred to the full game, unlocking special costumes and items and keeping experience points. A second demo was released on November 22, a month after the full game's release. It replaced the original demo and gave players access to exclusive items and costumes. A collector's edition was released exclusively through Square Enix's online store, containing artwork, a limited-edition version of the soundtrack, postcards and a booklet of character introductions. The title was later added to their Ultimate Hits budget title collection.

Type-0 has never received an official localization in its original form. During development, while it was still titled Agito XIII, Tabata said he was trying to make the game appealing to North American players. Despite a localization being confirmed as in development in an official guidebook interview, the original version of Type-0 was not released in the west. In the wake of the game's release in Japan, 1UP.com and Joystiq speculated that the game could be successfully brought west as a port to the PlayStation Vita. Tabata later commented that the main reasons for the game not being localized were the flagging Western PSP market and uncertainties surrounding the Vita's commercial success.

An unofficial fan translation patch was announced in mid-2012. Work on the fan translation took place over the following two years, during which time Square Enix was noncommittal concerning an official Western release. The patch was initially announced for an August 2014 release, but was instead released on June 9. According to the translation team leader, the patch was downloaded 100,000 times in the first four days. It was taken down in July of the same year after Square Enix allegedly threatened unspecified legal action, originally thought to be a cease-and-desist order. Later statements revealed that the patch was released earlier than originally announced due to the lead translator on the project wanting fans to see their achievements, which ended up causing a rift between him and the rest of the team. Before the release, Square Enix and the translation team had been in friendly communication concerning the translation. The formal requests to take the patch down were made in the weeks following its release, shortly before the announcement of Type-0 HD. Work on the patch was eventually resumed and a second version, which included unofficial compatibility with the PlayStation 3 system and further translation bugfixes, was eventually released in 2015.

=== Merchandise ===
Multiple pieces of merchandise were created for the game. An Ultimania, part of a series of dedicated guidebooks, was released in the same month as the original game. It contained story and character breakdowns, concept art, and interviews with developers. A different book, Final Fantasy Type-0 World Preview, (Note: ファイナルファンタジー零式 ワールドプレビュー, Fainaru Fantajī Reishiki Wārudo Purebyū) was also released in October. It featured character biographies, details on the world of Orience, and interviews with the voice actors for Class Zero. The following year, a dedicated art book was released containing artwork of the game's characters and monsters, and an interview with Tabata. Characters from the game, including Ace, Machina and other members of Class Zero, appeared in the fourth series of releases for the Final Fantasy Trading Card Game. In November 2011, a manga adaptation of Type-0, illustrated by Takatoshi Shiozawa, began serialization in Young Gangan magazine. The manga has been collected into a tankōbon volume and was released on April 21, 2012. Another manga titled Final Fantasy Type-0 Side Story: Reaper of the Icy Blade, (Note: ファイナルファンタジー零式外伝 氷剣の死神, Fainaru Fantajī Reishiki Gaiden Hyouken no Shinigami) also illustrated by Shiozawa, began publication in Young Gangan in April 2012. It ended in January 2014, with a bonus chapter being published in February of that year, and was later released in five compiled volumes. Yen Press began distribution of the manga in the west in July 2015. Square Enix released two novel adaptations, in April and June 2012, depicting an alternate version of Type-0's story: Final Fantasy Type-0: Change the World -The Answer- (Note: ファイナルファンタジー零式 Change the World -The Answer-, Fainaru Fantajī Reishiki Chenji Za Wārudo -Za Ansā-) and Final Fantasy Type-0: Change the World Volume 2 -The Penultimate Truth-. (Note: ファイナルファンタジー零式 Change the World 2巻 -最後から二番目の真実-, Fainaru Fantajī Reishiki Chenji Za Wārudo 2-kan -Banme no Shinjitsu-) The novels were written by Sōki Tsukishima.

== Reception ==
Reception

Review scores
Publication	Score
Famitsu	39/40
Dengeki PlayStation	91.25/100
PlayStation LifeStyle	8/10
RPG Site	9/10

In the first week on sale, Final Fantasy Type-0 sold 472,253 units, topping Japanese sales charts and selling through 79.08% of its initial shipments. As of January 2012, the game had sold 746,203 copies in Japan. It was the best-selling game of 2011 for Japanese media retail shop Tsutaya, beating Monster Hunter Portable 3rd (PlayStation Portable) and Final Fantasy XIII-2 (PlayStation 3). It was also the store's best-selling PSP title of the year, followed by Monster Hunter Portable 3rd and Dissidia 012 Final Fantasy.

Famitsu and Dengeki PlayStation both praised the story, with Famitsu saying it "vividly portrays the fact that this is a deep, intense Final Fantasy experience, something beyond just a side story". Gaming website PlayStation LifeStyle's Heath Hindman was impressed by the darker presentation, calling it "powerful and well done throughout", and was impressed with the characters despite some awkward introductory scenes. Erren Van Duine, writing for RPG Site, said that fans would appreciate the scale of the narrative, and praised the handling of the Fabula Nova Crystallis mythos. She did note that some plot points seemed only included for the sake of convenience, and that the ending forced a second playthrough to see the whole story.

Famitsu called the original version's gameplay a "stressless experience", praising the game's size and saying the action-oriented battle system made it "a very different Final Fantasy". Dengeki PlayStation similarly praised its size and the tense combat, though the review found aspects of the navigation less appealing. Hindman was generally positive about most aspects of gameplay and the high replay value, but found faults with the scripted opening of the overworld and the real-time strategy segments. Van Duine said the gameplay encouraged immersion and was harsh on novices; she praised several aspects of gameplay, but described the leveling system as "tricky". The multiplayer functions were universally praised in Japan. Opinions were divided on the original camera, with Famitsu praising its movement, while Van Duine and Dengeki PlayStation found issues with it getting stuck in the environment or impeding visibility. The character AI also received criticism for being unresponsive or wayward.

== Legacy ==
Type-0 affected several other works in multiple ways. During its development, several staff members and voice actors who had worked on Final Fantasy X reunited. Their meeting triggered the development of Final Fantasy X/X-2 HD Remaster. In September 2013, Square Enix revealed Final Fantasy Agito, an online companion game to Type-0 for iOS and Android mobile devices. The game was released in May 2014, and a localization was announced alongside that of Type-0. Its servers were closed down in November 2015, with its localization being cancelled as a result. A new online game set in the Type-0 universe, Final Fantasy Awakening, was released in Asian and English-speaking territories between 2016 and 2018.

While working on Final Fantasy XV, Tabata decided to make a high-definition remaster of Type-0 for eighth-generation consoles. Developed by Square Enix and HexaDrive, Final Fantasy Type-0 HD was released worldwide in March 2015. After Type-0's release, Tabata stated in an interview that he wished to explore the distant history of Orience after the events of the game. Trademarks for Type-1, Type-2 and Type-3 were registered shortly after the Type-0 trademark, but it was suggested that they were simply a protective measure. During interviews given in 2014, Tabata commented that he wished to work on Type-1 after completing XV, and later explained the conceptual Type series as a means of publishing Final Fantasy games too experimental for the main series. He hoped to continue with the Type series if Type-0 HD was commercially successful.
