= Final Fantasy Type-0 HD =

2015 video game

- Type-0 HD box art featuring central protagonist Ace
- Developers: Square Enix Business Division 2; HexaDrive
- Publisher: Square Enix
- Director: Hajime Tabata
- Producer: Hajime Tabata
- Artist: Yusuke Naora
- Writer: Hiroki Chiba
- Composer: Takeharu Ishimoto
- Series: Fabula Nova Crystallis; Final Fantasy
- Platforms: PlayStation 4; Xbox One; Windows
- Release: PlayStation 4, Xbox One; NA: March 17, 2015; JP: March 19, 2015; EU: March 20, 2015; Windows; WW: August 18, 2015
- Genre: Action role-playing
- Mode: Single-player

Final Fantasy Type-0 HD (Japanese: ファイナルファンタジー零式 HD, Hepburn: Fainaru Fantajī Reishiki HD) is an action role-playing game developed by Square Enix and HexaDrive, and published by Square Enix for PlayStation 4 and Xbox One, and later for Windows via Steam. It was released worldwide in March 2015, while the Steam port was released in August. Type-0 HD is a high-definition remaster of the Japan-exclusive PlayStation Portable game Final Fantasy Type-0, a spin-off from the main Final Fantasy series and part of the Fabula Nova Crystallis subseries, a set of games sharing a common mythos. The story focuses on Class Zero, a group of fourteen students from the Dominion of Rubrum who must fight the neighboring Militesi Empire when they launch an assault on the other Crystal States of Orience. In doing so, the group become entangled in both the efforts to push back and defeat the forces of Militesi, and the secret behind the war and the existence of the crystals.

After Type-0 received a 2011 Japan-only release on PSP, Type-0 HD began development in mid-2012 as part of a move to promote the next generation of gaming consoles, and gave the opportunity for multiple changes to refine the experience for players. Outside of updated graphics and an expanded color palette, Type-0 HD is largely identical to the original PSP version, although the original's multiplayer functionality was dropped, and additional difficulty levels were implemented. Type-0 HD reached high positions in international sales charts, and has sold over one million copies worldwide as of October 2015. It received praise for its story and battle system, while criticisms have focused on its HD upgrade and localization.

== Gameplay ==
Screenshot of combat in Final Fantasy Type-0 HD, showing characters Ace, Queen and Nine in combat with human enemies and a mech.

Final Fantasy Type-0 HD is an action role-playing video game that utilizes a real-time battle system similar to Crisis Core: Final Fantasy VII. The player controls Class Zero, an elite fighting force of fourteen students from Rubrum's Akademeia. Outside mission environments and Akademeia (Class Zero's home base), Class Zero navigates Orience through a scaled-down world map. The world can be navigated on foot, using chocobos (recurring galliform birds in the Final Fantasy series) or via an airship. Type-0 HD is split into missions with free periods in between. During these free periods between missions, players can explore Akademeia, breed chocobos for personal use, and complete side quests for characters in Akademeia and liberated towns.

During missions, three members of Class Zero can be selected for missions while the others are kept in reserve in case a player character dies. The lead character can be swapped at any time, with the other two being controlled by the game's artificial intelligence. During certain story missions, players take part in real-time strategy battles on the world map. During combat missions, players gain experience points and increase their experience level as they defeat enemies, as well as obtaining Phantoma from defeated enemies, used to upgrade the characters' magic skills. Each character has access to summoned monsters called Eidolons (War Gods (軍神, Gunshin) in the original Japanese), which are summoned for limited periods at the cost of a character's total health.

While the core gameplay remains the same, multiple adjustments were made to existing systems. The HD version features four difficulty levels as opposed to the original's three, including an "easy" option. The original game's multiplayer elements were removed during optimization for consoles, and types of magic and accessories previously only available in multiplayer were incorporated into the single-player campaign. A feature unique to Type-0 HD is the support personnel (SP) system: when activated, AI-controlled support characters take the place of normal party members. SP points earned in battle can be used to purchase special items. Additional character costumes made included through the original's demos and downloadable content were included in Type-0 HD as unlockables, along with costumes unique to the HD version.

== Development ==
Multiple changes were made to Type-0 (top) for its eighth generation console release (bottom). These changes include updated graphics and a broader color palette than the original.

During the production of Final Fantasy Type-0, the development team explored the possibility of a high-definition port of the game. The idea never went beyond experimentation as the team was focused on keeping the game as a portable experience. The team also experimented with a sequel on eighth generation consoles, but production was halted when the development team were transferred to Final Fantasy XV. After some time working on XV, original director Hajime Tabata decided to develop Type-0 HD for eighth-generation consoles. The game began development in mid-2012, around the same time XV was shifted onto PlayStation 4 (PS4) and Xbox One. Tabata came on board in July of that year as director and producer, though his involvement was fairly minor due to his directing duties for XV. The main development was handled by HexaDrive, who had previously collaborated successfully with Square Enix on The 3rd Birthday, and had developed the high-definition remasters of Ōkami and The Legend of Zelda: The Wind Waker. The remaster was intended as an incentive for Final Fantasy players in both Japan and the west to purchase eighth generation consoles before XV's release. The original plan was for a port to both the seventh generation PlayStation 3 and Xbox 360 consoles, and eighth generation consoles. After the PS4 proved popular at the 2013 Tokyo Game Show, and as Tabata had no development experience with seventh generation console hardware, the team focused on the eighth generation versions. According to art director Yusuke Naora, moving from the PlayStation Portable to eighth-generation hardware proved hard for the team. Despite early claims, no version of Type-0 HD was developed for the PlayStation Vita. According to Tabata, this was due to difficulties in porting between console and Vita development environments, and his wish for a playing experience he could only envision on home consoles.

HexaDrive handled the 2D screen displays, world map features and lip synching, while Square Enix handled the 3D graphics, such as character models in cutscenes. Lighting effects and in-game assets were improved and updated for HD consoles using the DirectX 11 technology utilized for XV. Alongside this, a large proportion of the upgrade was done using HexaDrive's in-house engine HexaDrive Engine 2.0. While originally meant to have a cursory role compared to the DirectX 11 elements, it ended up being used far more than anticipated. The resolution was increased from the original game's 480x272 pixels to the 1920x1080 required. Despite all these changes, the team took care that the lighting and shadow effects remained faithful to the look of the original, as updating too much of the game's visual style would fundamentally alter the experience. Due to scheduling, there was sometimes pressure on the HexaDrive team and they experienced difficulties with the hardware as it was their first time developing for eighth-generation consoles. Updating the lighting effects alone took a whole year of development to finish. While updating the characters' appearance, the team were forced to focus on the main characters due to production deadlines, consequently doing less work on NPCs such as Kurasame. For the main characters' gameplay models, the team adapted the models used in the original cutscenes, as they were more detailed than the original gameplay models due to a higher polygon count. Tabata wanted the main characters to remain as true as possible to their original appearances, but due to the cutscene models appearing older than the original gameplay models, they needed adjusting so they better reflected the original models. The team also adjusted the characters' appearances slightly to make them more "charming". Visual optimization was still going on during the game's reveal, with the team needing to create special screenshots of Type-0's characters operating inside the production environments of XV. Ultimately, these visuals gave the team a guide for what the final game should look like, reducing the amount of trial and error.

No new gameplay content was added to Type-0 HD. The team instead focused on upgrading the graphics, adjusting existing gameplay for home consoles, and including a lower difficulty level. The latter was due to complaints from players that the original game was too difficult. While carrying over the original's multiplayer functions was considered, it would have lengthened the estimated development time by another year. Since Tabata's priority was to bring the game to fans worldwide, the multiplayer and associated elements were either removed or incorporated into the single-player campaign. Tabata also decided against creation of a demo or an international version for this reason. As a substitute for the multiplayer, the team strengthened and improved the original single-player Academy Assistance function. As with the original, the team used the names of developers from both the core team and other Square Enix departments for the NPCs. While the main story remained unchanged, a secret cutscene teasing future Type games was commissioned. Created by Square Enix's CGI movie subsidiary Visual Works, it was based on some of Tabata's early ideas for Type-0. A small piece of the cutscene was shown privately to attendees of Square Enix's 25th anniversary commemoration event for the Final Fantasy series. Hiroki Chiba, writer for Type-0, returned to write the scene. In the cutscene, a fatally wounded samurai warrior resembling main protagonist Ace is saved from death by a fire spirit.

At Tabata's suggestion, Naora expanded the color palette to increase the game's realism and tie in with XV's art style. The original idea was to change the original red hue to a golden one to match the redone logo, but the graphics looked too dark on the large screen even with the adjustment, so blue tones were added to brighten up the scenery. Additional bass sounds were added to the sound effects, as the original platform's speaker system had previously limited the range and strength of sounds. The original camera behavior needed to be developed from scratch, as the camera angles used in the original looked out of place on the large screen. During the run-up to release, the team made modifications to the camera after receiving negative comments during demonstrations, addressing scenery collisions and the visibility of player and enemy characters during active gameplay. Because of these modifications, character speed and movement could be increased and improved. By December 2014, the game was in its final stages of development and undergoing debugging.

=== Music ===
Final Fantasy Type-0 HD Original Soundtrack

Soundtrack album by Takeharu Ishimoto
- Released: October 26, 2011
- Genre: Video game soundtrack
- Length: 3:52:05
- Label: Square Enix
- Producer: Takeharu Ishimoto

The original soundtrack for Type-0 by Takeharu Ishimoto, who also composed the music for Before Crisis, Crisis Core and The World Ends with You. Ishimoto rearranged, remixed and re-recorded the soundtrack for Type-0 HD. This was due to the original soundtrack was composed within the limits of PSP hardware, making it unsuitable for the new console release. Because of a restricted budget, he did the bulk of the work himself. One of the changes he made was making the choral sound more prominent. In addition, he composed a new battle theme and recorded an English version of "Colorful - Falling in Love", the track for Type-0's alternate ending. The lyrics were translated by SAWA, a singer who had worked on The World Ends with You. The English version was made for the overseas version of the game, but was included in the remastered soundtrack's commercial release. Type-0's original theme song, "Zero" by Japanese rock band Bump of Chicken, was used again for Type-0 HD. While a translated version was considered for the localization, the team, with permission from the band, decided to use the original song and add subtitles for the song lyrics.

For the additional ending and credits of Type-0 HD, a new song titled "Utakata" (泡沫; lit. "Transience") was commissioned by Tabata. Ishimoto created five different songs, with "Utakata" being Tabata's final choice. As Tabata wanted the song to have a Japanese style, Ishimoto wrote the lyrics in archaic Japanese, though he originally wanted to write the lyrics in English. It was created and recorded by a four-person team: Ishimoto composed the music, while singer Chris Ito wrote and sang the lyrics. The other two, T$UYO$HI and ZAX, were former members of alternate rock band Pay Money to My Pain and performed on bass guitar, and drums respectively. The song was first heard in the final Japanese trailer for Type-0 HD.

A commercial Blu-ray release for Type-0 HD's soundtrack, Final Fantasy Type-0 HD Original Soundtrack, was released on March 25, 2015. It includes the entire soundtrack, the newly composed tracks, tracks from Final Fantasy Agito and ten bonus MP3 tracks selected by Ishimoto from his previous work as a "Best of Collection". The Blu-ray album reached #189 in the Oricon charts, and remained in the charts for one week. The album, and music in general, have received positive comments from music critics and reviewers of the game.

== Release ==
Type-0 HD was released on March 17, 19 and 20, 2015 for North America, Japan and Europe respectively. It came with both English and Japanese voice tracks for all regions. The game included a demo of Final Fantasy XV, titled Final Fantasy XV: Episode Duscae. The demo was only available in limited quantities: it was exclusive to physical first-print editions, and came with the digital edition for two months after release. The collector's edition, available through Square Enix's online store and at Amazon.com, came with a special CD featuring tracks from Type-0 and Agito, a calendar featuring official artwork, a Vermillion Peristylium ID card, a set of five cards modeled after those used by Ace in battle, and a cadet scarf. Limited editions of the game were produced for North America and Europe, for sale at selected high street and online stores. A PlayStation 4 hardware bundle was also produced for Japan, featuring a copy of the game and download code for the XV demo along with a console themed after the game. A port to Windows via Valve's Steam platform was developed. This port was created in response to fan demands for a PC version. In contrast to the console version, the PC port allowed graphic adjustments, and included fixes for camera control and motion blur issues raised by players and reviewers after release. The port was released on August 18 the same year. As part of the promotion for the port, Final Fantasy-themed pre-order gifts for use in Dota 2 were created.

It was the first Final Fantasy title to be rated M for Mature by the Entertainment Software Rating Board for its North American release. For the western release, a collector's edition similar to that released in Japan was created, which included the card replicas and soundtrack selection. In addition, it included an English translation of the game's prequel manga, a steelbook holding the game disc and soundtrack selection featuring the logo and kanji artwork, and an 80-page artbook with a foreword written by Tabata. The winners of a separate special sweepstake received a themed PS4 or Xbox One, along with promotional artwork posters specific to each console, a Play Arts Kai mini-figurine of Ace, and a gold Vermillion Bird pin. Runners-up received individual pieces from the sweepstake excluding the consoles. To promote Type-0 HD in North America, a trailer for the game was shown in cinemas prior to some of the season's big film releases, such as The Hunger Games: Mockingjay – Part 1. A shortened version of the trailer was released online. To further promote the game upon release, Square Enix offered the Japanese thriller Battle Royale as a free rental for Xbox One in the weekend following the game's release. After its initial release, a patch was released to fix issues similar to those fixed in the PC port. At release, the PC version suffered from graphics problems, crashes, and had its graphics locked.

=== Localization ===
An international version was reported to be in the works by Tabata in the Ultimania guide for Type-0. He later commented that the main reasons for the original version not coming west was the flagging PSP market and the uncertainty of the Vita, making a port impractical. The name Type-0 was originally trademarked by Square Enix in Europe in December 2010, along with a logo. In an interview with GameSpot in November 2012, Tabata said that Square Enix was "taking a clean slate in terms of [their] plans", stating that if there was demand, a western release would be considered. In the same month, an alleged voice actor for the game said that English voice recording for the game was completed in late 2011. In 2014, Orion Acaba, the English voice actor for Nine, revealed that the voice recording eventually used in Type-0 HD was completed in 2012. According to another English voice actor, Cristina Vee, the game was codenamed Yellow P during the recording process.

During an interview with USGamer in September 2013, Tabata, commenting on both Type-0 and its prequel Agito, was hopeful for a western release: he said that the planned western release of Agito and the reaction of the fan community to both games had become a deciding factor, and that while the project had not been officially green-lit, it was in its final stages of preparation. He also clarified at the time that the game would not make the transition onto mobile devices or the PS3 as an HD Remaster. A localization was officially decided upon in early 2014, when a survey taken by Square Enix Europe found that a large number of fans wanted the game to be released overseas. The localization was announced when Type-0 HD was officially revealed by Square Enix at E3 2014. An official English version for the Vita was momentarily announced by the official "PlayStation Blog", but was clarified as "erroneous" less than an hour later.

== Reception ==
Reception

Aggregate scores
| Aggregator | Score |
|---|---|
| Metacritic | PS4: 72/100 (77 reviews); XONE: 72/100 (12 reviews); PC: 69/100 (9 reviews) |
| OpenCritic | 45% recommend (Note: Based on 76 reviews) |

Review scores
| Publication | Score |
|---|---|
| Game Informer | 6/10 |
| GameSpot | 8/10 |
| GamesRadar+ | 3.5/5 stars |
| GameTrailers | 8/10 |
| IGN | 8/10 |
| Official Xbox Magazine (US) | 3.5/5 stars |
| PC Gamer (US) | 58% |
| RPGFan | 85% |

=== Critical reception ===
IGN's Meghan Sullivan found the portrayal of the cadets' involvement in the war "incredibly moving" and was intrigued by the story's focus on war, but found the need to understand Orience's lore and mythology made the ending convoluted. Becky Cunningham of GamesRadar was fascinated by the game's setting and the questions it posed about morality and memory, finding the story worth experiencing. Alexa Ray Corriea, writing for GameSpot, generally enjoyed the story despite noting the main plot becoming complicated quickly, but stated that the ending introduced too many new story elements for comfort. Michael Damiani of GameTrailers found the overall story enjoyable, but gaps in story and character development, along with the need to replay the game to get the full story, "[leaves] you full of questions and doubt from beginning to end". Eurogamer's Chris Schilling was similarly critical of the need to understand terms unfamiliar to series newcomers. He also disliked the length of cutscenes, and the jarring change from grim imagery to lighter subjects like chocobo breeding. Tom Sykes of Official Xbox Magazine said that the setting and story's superficial similarities to the later Harry Potter books improved the story after the confusing opening. Game Informer's Matt Miller said that the story started strongly, but was made less enjoyable when it began focusing on the game's overarching narrative and said the abundance of characters had a negative impact on their characterization. RPGFan's Stephen Meyerink, despite saying the game had "goofy faces and silly moments", found the story and themes engaging. Samuel Roberts of PC Gamer was less positive, feeling that the story and characters reminded him too much of poor-quality anime series.

Sullivan generally enjoyed the combat and called it the game's best feature, while finding the real-time strategy segments an unpleasant hangover from the game's original form. Cunningham found it enjoyable mastering each of Class Zero's fighting styles despite difficulty spikes, but noted some gameplay elements such as stopping to use certain items detracted from her enjoyment of combat. Famitsu echoed many of its points of praise for the original, generally saying that both veterans of the original and newcomers would finding it "equally enjoyable", and were pleased with the change from a portable platform to home consoles. Sykes said the game "excels in its combat, which is fast-paced, complex, and tough". Damiani found the battles "a welcomed change" compared to previous Final Fantasy titles, but disliked other aspects such as the lock-on mechanic. Miller enjoyed exploring the characters' battle abilities, but found the high-speed detracted from the experience and considered the real-time strategy elements, boss fights and other systems poorly developed. Schilling also found the combat mechanics "sharp and satisfying", generally praising the combat mechanics. He was critical of the lengthy tutorials at the beginning of the game, and disappointed that the gameplay segments between missions did not impact the characters' combat ability as in the Persona series. Meyerink generally enjoyed the combat and various side activities, while faulting the game for inadequate introduction of gameplay elements. Corriea called the combat "marvellous", saying it handled it and the customization options better than many other games in its genre. Roberts enjoyed the combat, but found the RPG gameplay outside it to be far weaker. The limited optional gameplay segments between combat segments, offering opportunities for character development and side-quests, were also generally praised. A point of criticism shared by western reviewers with the original version was the camera control. Famitsu, in contrast, again praised the camera movement.

Corriea was mixed about the game's HD upgrade, stating that while the background were "gorgeous" and the main characters moved fluidly and expressed emotion properly, NPCs or characters unimportant to the stories did not receive the same attention as the main cast. Schilling was disappointed with the result, frequently citing scenery and character behavior that looked out of place on the big screen. Miller said that the game's visuals were "dominated by muddy textures and frequent loading", while he negatively noted the removal of the original's multiplayer. Damiani praised the upgrades for the main characters, but noted multiple inconsistencies in both the environments and cutscenes. Famitsu found the graphics "dramatically beautiful", but found it strange seeing the original environments on a large screen. Meyerink said that, while not hard on the eyes, the upgrades were well below what he expected. Sullivan praised the lighting and shading effects, but shared Corriea's criticism of NPCs and noted low-quality environmental textures, saying she was "so bored by most environments that [she] stopped caring about them halfway through the story". The localized dialogue also received mixed reactions, with multiple reviewers faulting the English voice actors' performances. Opinions on the PC port were mixed: Meyerink marked it as an improvement of the ports of the XIII games while acknowledging issues with the graphics and controls, while Roberts was not impressed by its performance.

=== Sales ===
In Japan, Type-0 HD reached the top of the sales charts in its debut week, selling 93,000: the PS4 version accounted for roughly 92,000, while the Xbox One version sold roughly 1,000. Type-0 HD, together with Resident Evil: Revelations 2, provoked a rise in sales for the PS4 while other console sales remained consistent, but it ultimately performed poorly, selling through only 59.59% of its shipment. It had sold over 128,000 units in Japan by August 2015, being the 26th best-selling video game during that period.

In Western territories, demand was notably higher due to the original version not being released outside Japan. In the UK, Type-0 HD reached second place in the gaming charts behind Battlefield Hardline, while it reached tenth place in the North American charts for March. As of October 2015, Type-0 HD had sold over one million copies worldwide, making a solid contribution to Square Enix's fiscal income for the year and the company's catalog of eighth-generation console games.
