= Final Fantasy Agito =

2014 mobile game

- Developers: Square Enix; Tayutau K.K.
- Publisher: Square Enix
- Director: Masayasu Nishida
- Producer: Hajime Tabata
- Designer: Kensuke Shimoda
- Artist: Sayoko Hoshino
- Composer: Takeharu Ishimoto
- Series: Fabula Nova Crystallis; Final Fantasy
- Engine: Unity
- Platforms: iOS, Android
- Release: JP: May 14, 2014
- Genre: Role-playing
- Modes: Single-player, multiplayer

Final Fantasy Agito (Japanese: ファイナルファンタジーアギト, Hepburn: Fainaru Fantajī Agito) was a 2014 role-playing video game developed and published by Square Enix for mobile devices. The game's story was set in the universe of Final Fantasy Type-0, and was an entry in the Fabula Nova Crystallis subseries. A downloadable episodic game similar to Final Fantasy Dimensions, it featured a turn-based combat system encouraging both single-player exploration and multiplayer combat. There was a day-night cycle tied to the real-world time of day, and it featured a social element whereby talking with and befriending certain characters advanced the player's ranking in the game.

The game, which acted as a companion to Type-0, was set in the world of Orience during a time of war between its four nations. The story was seen through the eyes of a player-created Cadet entering the Rubrum Magical Academy during a time of war, and chosen to become the Agito, a figure destined to save Orience from destruction. The original protagonists of Type-0 appeared in different roles and acted as secondary characters. The story was intended to be played repeatedly, tying into the nature of the game's world and the eventual culmination of a player becoming the Agito.

The game was developed around director Hajime Tabata's original concept for Final Fantasy Type-0 as a mobile game which would give players easy access to a universe within the Fabula Nova Crystallis series and would be influenced by player choice. The title stems from Type-0's earlier title Final Fantasy Agito XIII. Many of Type-0's staff returned, with Takeharu Ishimoto composing new music for the title, and former level designer Masayasu Nishida and texture artist Sayoko Hoshino returning respectively as producer and art director.

The game came online in May 2014, and remained active until its servers were shut down in November the following year. Upon release in Japan, the game had 500,000 registered users within a week, and one million by November of the same year, but apparently numbers dropped after later negative impressions. Japanese and Western journalists were positive at its release. The game did not continue in its current form, and was replaced by a new version. Planned versions for the PlayStation Vita and Windows devices were scrapped, along with an announced localization. Its successor, an online multiplayer game titled Final Fantasy Awakening, was released in 2016.

== Gameplay ==
Screenshots of the character interaction and combat system in Final Fantasy Agito

Final Fantasy Agito was a role-playing video game where a player-created character, the "Cadet", sets out on missions across the world of Orience. The player could choose the gender and physical appearance of their character, along with their style of clothing, hair color, skin tone, voice and weapons. During play, the in-game time of day was synchronized with local real-world time. The Cadet began the game by exploring the Rubrum Magical Academy, but was eventually able to explore Orience as a whole. The game employed a leveling system whereby interaction with students and teachers, combined with performance during missions, raised the Cadet from their starting rank within the Academy. Recurring creatures such as small flying Moogles and galliform riding birds called Chocobos appeared. A Moogle accompanied the Cadet around the Peristylium, while Chocobos could be ridden during later parts of the game. Navigation was handled either by a virtual control stick on the touch screen, or by tapping an area of the visible game environment. The Cadet's bedroom acted as a central hub, while the fountain area within the Academy was where many non-player characters (NPCs) could be found and talked with.

Conversations with the previous game's protagonists increased the Cadet's standing with them: if the player tapped a special button on-screen during timed sections of the conversation, the bond statistic with the chosen character would be increased. The relationships built up by the player triggered special character interactions during the final chapter. Agito featured sub-missions, the game's version of side-quests, some of which changed depending on the real-world day of the week. They were given by NPCs, and could range from crafting new spells and equipment to performing certain actions within a combat mission. Completing quests yielded rewards such as new equipment and items.

Unlike Final Fantasy Type-0, Agito used a turn-based combat system. The Attack menu, which appeared during battles, featured a gauge, which when full enabled the character to attack the targeted enemy, and buttons displayed for various physical and magical attacks; these abilities could be chained together into combos that, once used, took time to recharge. Pressing the "Ability" icon triggered assigned skills, while "Chain" abilities enabled the player to preset sequences of attacks and use them consecutively. Using certain setups rewarded the player with in-game bonuses. Also available was Type-0's Kill Sight ability, in which precisely timed actions enabled the Cadet to kill an enemy with one hit. The game also gave the option for players to adjust battle speed to their personal preference. Using a special item, players could temporarily summon both NPCs with whom they had a strong relationship and summoned monsters called Eidolons (Note: War Gods (軍神, Gunshin) in the original Japanese.) to deal high damage to enemies.

During single-player segments, the player could select two AI companions after selecting missions, which added to the player's total score at the end of these missions. During missions, the companions could be issued with Team Commands, which could either order them to attack or increase healing abilities while lowering their defensive capabilities. Each attempt at a mission used up the Cadet's stamina meter, which allowed a maximum of three missions at a time. The game used a job system similar to other entries in the Final Fantasy series, where different equipment and weapons alter a character's abilities in battle. Specific skills accompanied each job. Players could create multiple equipment sets, with each item and weapon ranked according to its rarity in-game. Materials gathered during missions could be used to upgrade the player's equipment and abilities.

== Synopsis ==
=== Setting and characters ===
Final Fantasy Agito takes place in Orience, a land divided between four nations, or Crystal States, which have existed in a state of near-constant war for the past thousand years: the Dominion of Rubrum, the Militesi Empire, the Kingdom of Concordia and the Lorican Alliance. The cause of the war is the nation's crystals, objects of magical and political power that bestow different blessings on each nation, and choose people to become magical warriors known as l'Cie, which serve and protect their respective crystal. The land of Orience is locked in a stable time loop, whereby events repeat constantly, then reset and begin all over again with minor variations. The reason is an experiment set up by the deities Pulse and Lindzei to find the doorway to the afterlife for their creator. The time in which Agito occurs is referred to as "the first cycle that surpasses the spiral of 600 million", being at the very beginning of Orience's spiral of repeating history. Agito's initial events differ from Type-0 as it was to have been directed to a history where the Agito is born, making it an alternate story using the same setting. The game's events across its lifetime are split across two "phases", or cycles of Orience's history. A key event at the end of each cycle is Tempus Finis, an event in which Orience is destined to end and be reborn.

The main character is a player-created Cadet selected for training as Agito, a prophesied messiah said to prevent Orience's destruction during an event known as Tempus Finis. Interacting with the Cadet on his journey are Ace, the previous game's main protagonist; Miyu Kagerohi, the representative for Cadets within the Vermillion Peristylium; Lean Hampelmann, a Militesi scientist; and Tono Mahoroha, a mysterious and cold young woman from Rubrum. The previous game's main cast, Class Zero, as well as Machina Kunagiri and Rem Tokimiya, former members of Class Zero who acted as Type-0's narrators, appear in supporting roles as students in other classes. Other characters include Marshal Cid Aulstyne, leader of the Milites Empire and the game's central antagonist; Arecia Al-Rashia, supervisor of magic at the Peirstylim and servant of Pulse; and Gala, unseen leader of the Lulusath Army and servant of Lindzei.

=== Plot ===
In the First Phase, the Cadet is saved from a Behemoth attack by Ace, who brings them to the safety of Akademeia. There they are introduced to everyday life and sent out on a mission against the Behemoth. Then war is declared against Milites after its aggressive actions against Rubrum and Lorica, and the Cadet learns of Class Zero. Concordia forms an alliance with Milites, severely hampering Rubrum's efforts. Rubrum then musters their forces, including their powerful magical warriors, and conquer all three Crystal States. In the final chapter, Rubrum's victory over the other Crystal States causes the arrival of Tempus Finis, and Miyu is made into a l'Cie and renamed Judge Myuria: her mission is to test the Cadet to see if they are worthy of becoming the Agito. The Cadet is victorious, but it is judged the Agito has not appeared and Tempus Finis consumes the world, resetting it for a new cycle of history.

In the Second Phase, events play in vaguely the same fashion, but there are minor variations: Lorica forms an alliance with Milites rather than being conquered, and while Concordia offers an alliance, Imperial sympathizers within Concordia orchestrate the Queen's death and ally with Concordia. After overcoming Lorica and Concordia, the Rubrum forces storm the Militesi capital and Cid is killed. Before dying, he warns the Cadet and his comrades of the Crystals' role in Orience's cycle. When Tempus Finis arrives, Ace goes alone to find the one mentioned by Cid. He is himself marked as a l'Cie and transformed into Judge Ace. As with the previous cycle, he is defeated, but Tempus Finis arrives and the cycle continues. In a final side story episode, various additional stories revolving around the main cast are revealed. Among the events presented are a talk between Myuria and Arecia as to whether to continue the experiment, and then Lean and Tono are chosen by Arecia to exist outside the cycle and retain their memories. In this new form, the two agree to gather the memories of Orience's people and find a way of liberating the world from its cycle. The story ends with them wishing the Cadet well, saying that they hope to meet them again in a future cycle.

== Development ==
The idea for Final Fantasy Agito originated with the early origins of Type-0. Originally, Type-0 was a game for mobiles titled Final Fantasy Agito XIII, but eventually changed platforms and title. Type-0's director Hajime Tabata still liked the "Agito" title and the original concepts for the game, which included an episodic storyline that hinged on player choice and day-night cycles linked to real-world time. With this in mind, Tabata decided to revisit it and began development of Agito: eventually, they settled on smartphones as the release platform of choice, partly because the platforms' progress since Type-0 started development. One of Tabata's wishes for the title was that players unfamiliar with Type-0 would download and play it. Development on the game began in September 2012. During development, Tabata considered Type-0 to have become the prototype for Agito, although it did not share much with its predecessor. The game's story grew out of what he originally conceived for Agito XIII before it evolved into Type-0. In contrast to Type-0's dark and serious storyline, the team decided to give Agito a lighter atmosphere, although serious dramatic scenes were still present. Along with returning staff, mobile developer Tayutau K. K. helped with development. The previous game's level designer, Masayasu Nishida, returned to direct, and original character texture artist Sayako Hoshino became art director. To create the characters' portrait animations for the smartphone environment, the team used Silicon Studio's Motion Portrait middleware. The game was developed using the Unity engine. The game's designer was Kensuke Shimoda, an industry veteran who had experience with Unity, and was in charge of designing the game's battle system. His involvement with the game ended after its release.

=== Music ===
The music for Agito was composed by Takeharu Ishimoto, who had composed the score for Type-0. At first, no original music was to have been created for the title, but Ishimoto convinced the company to allow him to compose new music. The title still lifted several pieces of music from Type-0. Part of Ishimoto's wish for the title was to incorporate accents from Japanese pop music which would register well with fans. The pop-oriented tunes were also meant to emphasize the lighter atmosphere, although more dramatic music was used for the darker moments. Arrangements were done by Kentaro Sato. The battle music for the weekend multiplayer segments was augmented with vocal work by Japanese rock band Dazzle Vision. Two music tracks from the game were available at the 2014 Tokyo Game Show (TGS) in a giveaway CD along with other tracks from future game releases. Tracks from the game were included with tracks from Type-0 in a special disc included in the collector's edition of Type-0 HD. All new tracks from Agito were included in the Blu-ray album for Type-0 HD, Final Fantasy Type-0 HD Original Soundtrack.

== Release ==
The first hint of its existence became public when Square Enix trademarked the name in May 2013. The game was first announced in the second September issue of Famitsu Weekly, and was demoed during TGS 2013. Originally scheduled for release in the winter, it was delayed due to development problems concerning environment sizes, which needed to be scaled down. It was rescheduled for the first quarter of 2014, then was pushed forward to spring of that year. Street clothes for the characters were offered as a pre-registration bonus, while a code to download outfits inspired by Kurasame, a supporting character from Type-0, were included in the final volume of the spin-off manga Final Fantasy Type-0 Side Story: Reaper of the Icy Blade. Pre-registration closed on May 7, 2013. Chapter delivery began the day after the game's official release on May 14, 2014. The base game was a free download, but players had the option of buying items, restore health and speeding up re-spawn time via microtransactions. The original version also reset individual character experience levels at the end of a playthrough, while an update in 2015 allowed players to carry over experience levels between playthroughs.

=== Episodes ===
Final Fantasy Agito was published in chapters, with decisions made by the player base influencing the events of the next installment. The number of chapters was designed to be smaller than that of Tabata's previous Final Fantasy title for mobiles, Before Crisis: Final Fantasy VII. The intention was to create a high replay value. The projected chapter delivery rate was once a fortnight. Chapters are designed to take around two weeks for players to complete, with the first 10 days involving single-player solo missions. The final portions feature "subjugation" multiplayer missions, requiring players to work together to battle powerful bosses. These battles take place during weekends.

Each chapter comes in four or five named segments, with each containing different story missions. There is a heavy emphasis on player choice in the story, with decisions made during previous episodes of the story affecting future events. The game's story is meant to be played repeatedly, with different decisions yielding different outcomes. Chapter delivery was projected to, and eventually ended, in September 2014. After all chapters were released, the team focused on improving the experience, introducing a higher difficulty setting, and incorporating a grander sense of scale. They also developed further scenario choices to expand variation of events in future playthroughs. In the months after the initial release, a second "phase" of the story began release through 2014 into 2015. In addition to the final chapter, a gaiden episode was released that concluded the events of Agito. Special battles against the Rursus, then against Miyu and multiple Eidolons, were made available during the game's final month.

Episodes (Note: Episode titles in the opening cards appear in English and Japanese.)
| Phase | Title | Release date |
|---|---|---|
| 1 | Chapter 0: Those Closest to Agito (第零章 アギトにもっとも近い者, Dai Reishō: Agito ni Mottomo Chikaimono) | May 15, 2014 |
| 1 | Chapter 1: Battlefield of the Chosen (第一章 撰ばれし子らの戦場, Dai Isshō: Erabareshikora no Senjō; lit. "The Battlefield of Sons Chosen for Death") | June 2, 2014 |
| 1 | Chapter 2: Vermiel Wings of Hope (第二章 救国の朱き翼, Dai Nishō: Kyūkoku no Akaki Tsubasa; lit. "Vermillion Wings of National Salvation") | June 16, 2014 |
| 1 | Chapter 3: Will of the Fighters (第三章 戦う者たちの意思, Dai Sanshō: Tatakau Monotachi no Ishi; lit. "The Will of Those Who Fight") | July 18, 2014 |
| 1 | Chapter 4: Those Who Seek Agito (第四章 アギトを目指す者たち, Dai Yonshō: Agito o Mezasu Monotachi; lit. "Those Who Aim for Agito") | 4 August 2014 |
| 1 | Chapter 5: The Decision (第五章 運命の決断, Dai Goshō: Unmei no Ketsudan; lit. "The Decision of Fate") | 28 August 2014 |
| 1 | Final Chapter: Time of Judgment (最終章 審判の刻, Sai Shūshō: Shinpan no Toki; lit. "Time of the Judge") | 16 September 2014 |
2
| 2 | Chapter 0: The Gears of Fate in Motion (第零章 運命の歯車が動く刻, Dai Reishō: Unmei no Haguruma ga Ugoku Koku) | 17 November 2014 |
| 2 | Chapter 1: Tomorrow's World (第一章 明日の世界のために, Dai Isshō: Ashita no Sekai no Tame Ni; lit. "For The World of Tomorrow") | 15 December 2014 |
| 2 | Chapter 2: The Ties That Bind (第二章 絆, Dai Nishō: Kizuna; lit. "Bonds") | 19 January 2015 |
| 2 | Chapter 3: Dominion Under Siege (第三章 朱雀包囲網, Dai Sanshō: Suzaku Hōi-mō; lit. "Suzaku Encirclement") | 23 February 2015 |
| 2 | Chapter 4: Crimson and Azure (第四章 朱と蒼, Dai Yonshō: Shu to Ao; lit. "Vermillion and Blue") | 31 March 2015 |
| 2 | Chapter 5: Inveniam Viam (第五章 自らの道を、自らの意志で, Dai Goshō: Mizukara no Michi O, Mizukara no Ishi De; lit. "Their Own Way, At Their Own Will") | 11 May 2015 |
| 2 | Final Chapter: Precipice of History (最終章 歴史の終端で, Sai Shūshō: Rekishi no Shūtan De; lit. "At the End of History") | 17 June 2015 |

=== Post-release ===
Agito's original release was plagued with multiple issues including long load times, which the team sought to rectify through updates. After the initial release, a Club Activities system was going to be added. Similar to the Guilds of previous games, players could ally with them, engage in activities unique to the clubs and compete with rival clubs in contests. From the end of July to mid August during the game's original release, it was featured in a crossover with Rise of Mana, a mobile installment in Square Enix's Mana series. An earlier collaboration was also staged between Agito and Square Enix Legend World, a Japan-exclusive browser game. A novel based within the continuity of Agito titled Final Fantasy Agito: Change the World -A Whiter Shade of Pale- (Note: ファイナルファンタジーアギト Change the World ～青い影～, Fainaru Fantajī Agito Chenji Za Wārudo -Aoi Kage-) was released on April 30, 2015. Written by Tora Tsukishima, it focuses on the characters of Nine and Rubrum cadet Naghi Minatsuchi.

A port for the PlayStation Vita titled Final Fantasy Agito+ (Note: ファイナルファンタジーアギトプラス, Fainaru Fantajī Agito Purasu) was announced and demoed during the 2014 Tokyo Game Show. The decision to port the game to this platform was made upon due to popular demand and platform compatibility with the Unity engine. While originally scheduled for release in January 2015, it was delayed due to a problem with the development environment with the Vita, which left the team stuck until Sony could update the system and provide them with suitable support. The team also used it as an opportunity to improve the overall quality of the port. The Vita version was to include access to all the content of the mobile version along with added control and gameplay improvements. As part of the physical release, players were to be given codes for downloadable content: the content includes rare in-game armor and items. Save data from the mobile version could not be transferred to the Vita. In September 2015, the Vita port was cancelled. Tabata later explained that the team had been confronted by a "technical bottleneck", facing critical problems with the multiplayer functionality, together with problems involving server compatibility.

Eventually, it was determined by the developers that Agito was no longer suited for continued updates. The game was shut down on November 30, 2015. The game was also being ported to Microsoft Windows for operation on the Windows 10 home operating system and Windows 10 Mobile-compatible smartphones and tablets. The mobile version was to have been the continued main focus for the team despite the Windows port. After the cancellation of Agito+ and the end of Agito's service, refunds were offered to customers who had bought items in-game or preordered the Vita port.

=== Cancelled localization ===
The first hint of a localization appeared when the Agito trademark filed for European territories in September 2013. Later, at TGS 2013, Tabata said that Agito would definitely be localized, although he refused to clarify whether this meant it would be released in western territories. An official western release was confirmed by Square Enix at Electronic Entertainment Expo 2014. The plan for the international release was to first release Final Fantasy Type-0 HD so players in the west could get accustomed to the world and characters, then release Agito as a separate experience rather than a parallel release. With its discontinuance in Japan, Agito's western release was consequently cancelled.

== Reception ==
Roughly a week after Agito's release, it was announced that the game had 500,000 registered users in Japan. By November of that year, the figure had expanded to one million players. Later, Touch Arcade reported that active player numbers had dropped drastically after long-term poor impressions.

Famitsu, in a review of the game shortly after release, praised the combat and graphics, but found the touch controls difficult to handle. The reviewer finished by recommending the game to fans of the Final Fantasy series. Kotaku's Richard Eisenbeis said that the game went "far beyond what [he] expected going in", noting that he did not feel outclassed by other players despite not using the game's microtransaction system. Shaun Musgrave of Touch Arcade praised the game's graphics and combat, comparing the battle missions to Puzzle & Dragons. He did question the general balance, but noted that the game was still young and Square Enix had the chance to smooth things out.

== Legacy ==
As part of its announcement of the game's shutdown, Square Enix said that a new updated version was being prepared that would be better suited for further updates and improved player experience. This updated version was revealed to be Final Fantasy Awakening, a multiplayer game for similar platforms to Agito. In the wake of the cancellation of Agito's Western release and the announcement of Awakening, it was stated that Awakening was being considered for international release in place of Agito. Releasing first in 2016 in mainland China, it went on to be released across Asian and Australian territories in multiple languages over following years.

== See also ==
- Fabula Nova Crystallis Final Fantasy
