= Fabula Nova Crystallis Final Fantasy =

Video game series

- Logo depicting a deity from the series' mythos (Note: In the interview, Yoshinori Kitase does not say which deity the logo depicts, instead suggesting people speculate on its identity.)
- Genre: Role-playing
- Developer: Square Enix (Note: Additional developers were brought on for some entries, such as Lightning Returns, Final Fantasy Agito and Final Fantasy XV.)
- Publisher: Square Enix
- Creators: Kazushige Nojima, Shinji Hashimoto, Yoshinori Kitase
- Platforms: Android, Google Stadia, iOS, PlayStation 3, PlayStation 4, PlayStation Portable, Windows, Xbox 360, Xbox One
- First release: Final Fantasy XIII; December 17, 2009
- Latest release: Final Fantasy Awakening; December 14, 2016

Fabula Nova Crystallis Final Fantasy (Note: Japanese: ファブラ ノヴァ クリスタリス ファイナルファンタジー, Hepburn: Fabura Nova Kurisutarisu Fainaru Fantajī) (Note: Translated by Square Enix as "The New Tale of the Crystal". Fabula Nova Crystallis is dog Latin which literally translates to "A New Story for the Crystals": correct Latin would be Fabula Nova Crystalli.) is a series of games within the Final Fantasy video game franchise. It was primarily developed by series creator and developer Square Enix, which also acted as publisher for all titles. While featuring various worlds and different characters, each Fabula Nova Crystallis game is ultimately based on and expands upon a common mythos focusing on important crystals tied to deities. The level of connection to the mythos varies between each title, with each development team given the freedom to adapt the mythos to fit the context of a game's story.

The series, originally announced in 2006 as Fabula Nova Crystallis Final Fantasy XIII, consists of seven games across multiple platforms. Final Fantasy XIII, designed as the series' flagship title, was released in 2009. The creative forces behind the series include many developers from previous Final Fantasy titles, including Shinji Hashimoto and Motomu Toriyama. The mythos was conceived and written by Kazushige Nojima. The first games announced for the series were Final Fantasy XIII, Final Fantasy XV (as Versus XIII), and Final Fantasy Type-0 (as Agito XIII). All three games went through delays. After Final Fantasy XIII and Type-0's releases, their respective teams used ideas and concepts from development to create additional games. For later games, other studios have been brought in to help with aspects of development. Final Fantasy XV was distanced from the series brand for marketing purposes, though it retains thematic connections.

Seven titles, the original three projects and four additional titles, have been released as of 2016. The series is complemented by works in related media, including companion books, novelizations, and manga. Final Fantasy XV notably expanded into a multimedia project, spawning a feature film and an original animated webseries. Individual games have generally received a positive reception, although opinions have been more mixed over various aspects of the three Final Fantasy XIII games. Reception of the mythos' use in the released games has also been mixed: while some critics called it confusing or too similar to the lore of the main series, others were impressed by its scope and use. Retrospective opinions on the series have also been mixed.

== Titles ==
Release timeline
2009	Final Fantasy XIII
2010
2011	Final Fantasy Type-0
2011	Final Fantasy XIII-2
2012
2013	Lightning Returns: Final Fantasy XIII
2014	Final Fantasy Agito
2015
2016	Final Fantasy XV
2016	Final Fantasy Awakening

Fabula Nova Crystallis Final Fantasy currently consists of seven titles across multiple platforms, including sequels and spin-offs of the original three entries. The entries in the Fabula Nova Crystallis series share the same mythology, interpreted differently and referred to in varying degrees for each of the game worlds.

- Final Fantasy XIII, the thirteenth core Final Fantasy game and the first title in the series. First released in Japan as a PlayStation 3 exclusive in December 2009, it was released on the PlayStation 3 and Xbox 360 in North America and Europe in March 2010. A version of the game for the Xbox 360, Final Fantasy XIII Ultimate Hits International, was released in Japan in December 2010. XIII was released as a digital download for Windows in October 2014. The game was designed as a story-driven single-player role-playing game (RPG), with a battle system designed to emulate the cinematic battles seen in the film Final Fantasy VII: Advent Children.
  - Final Fantasy XIII-2, a direct sequel to XIII, was released in December 2011 in Japan, and in January and February, 2012 in North America and Europe respectively for PS3 and 360. It received downloadable content (DLC) expansions during 2012, and a Windows port in 2014. In response to criticism the company received from critics and fans about XIII's linear structure, XIII-2 was designed to be a more traditional role-playing game, with explorable towns, a nonlinear story structure, mini-games, and other traditional features.
  - Lightning Returns: Final Fantasy XIII, a sequel to XIII and XIII-2, was released in November 2013 in Japan, and February 2014 in North America and Europe for PS3 and 360. A Windows port was released in 2015. It concludes both the narrative of the main character Lightning and the Final Fantasy XIII story arc. Lightning Returns blends several traditional role-playing features, such as shops, quests and an explorable open world, with an action-oriented combat system.
- Final Fantasy Type-0 (originally titled Final Fantasy Agito XIII) was released in October 2011 in Japan for the PlayStation Portable. A high-definition remaster for PlayStation 4 and Xbox One, Final Fantasy Type-0 HD, was released worldwide in March 2015. The original game is a real-time action RPG, featuring combat similar to Crisis Core: Final Fantasy VII, and a multiplayer option where online players can take control of characters during the majority of the game. Type-0 HD features updated graphics and changes to the gameplay, such as lower difficulty and the removal of multiplayer.
  - Final Fantasy Agito, a companion title set in Type-0's world, was released in May 2014 in Japan on Android and iOS devices. Service ended in November 2015. Ports for the PlayStation Vita and Microsoft Windows were also in development, but have since been canceled. Agito was an episodic game featuring single-player and multi-player modes, and a social system where the player's standing with non-playable characters advances their rank in-game.
  - Final Fantasy Awakening, a replacement for Agito, was released in December 2016 in China, and in February 2018 in North America for Android and iOS. The gameplay features cooperative multiplayer similar to the original multiplayer elements of Type-0, along with hack-and-slash gameplay. All versions have closed down as of 2020.
- Final Fantasy XV (originally known as Final Fantasy Versus XIII), the fifteenth core Final Fantasy title, was released worldwide on November 29, 2016, for PS4 and Xbox One. It was later ported to Windows and the Google Stadia platform. The game is an action role-playing game with a battle system similar to those from the Kingdom Hearts series and Type-0. The game uses open world exploration using both a vehicle and chocobos, along with a camping mechanic linked to gaining experience levels. Its development cycle, beginning in 2006, lasted ten years. The game was supported by DLC between 2016 and 2019.

Final Fantasy XIII and its sequels have a strong connection to the mythos, making extensive use of its terminology and involving many of its deities. The universe of Final Fantasy Type-0 used the terminology and made minor reference to the mythos while focusing on the human side of events, although these references were added during later story development. While the mythos is still present in Final Fantasy XV, it was "disconnected" from the core framework, with specific terminology being removed and its emphasis reduced to become a background element for the world and story.

== Themes ==
The universes of Final Fantasy XIII, Type-0 and Final Fantasy XV are unrelated to each other, though common elements and themes are present. The first is a common narrative theme of harmful interference by the mythos' deities in the affairs of humans, and those humans' choice of whether to accept or challenge the predetermined fates given to them. Tetsuya Nomura defined this theme as "a battle of the gods that lies behind each tale and gives it inspiration in a different way". Hajime Tabata later defined the theme as a tale of humans placing their lives at risk after being chosen by the crystal. The second common element is the structure of the Fabula Nova Crystallis universe, which is divided in two: the mortal world, where humans live, and the afterlife or Unseen Realm (不可視世界, Fukashi sekai; lit. "Invisible World"). A recurring theme is subverting the series' traditional view of crystals, making them objects that brought both prosperity and tragedy by their influence.

A common element not related to the mythos, themes or plots of the series is the use of Latin in the games' titles or worlds, often as key words to describing themes and story points. The series' title Fabula Nova Crystallis is translated by Square Enix as "The New Tale of the Crystal", Agito roughly translates as "to put into motion", while Versus translates as both "to turn around" and "against". All these Latin terms were described as representing key narrative concepts. The Agito term was kept in Final Fantasy Type-0 as both an in-universe concept and the title of its prequel. Versus was used in early trailers for Final Fantasy XV after its re-reveal in 2013, carrying the tagline A World of the Versus Epic. Commenting on the extensive use of Latin in Final Fantasy XV prior to its public name change, Nomura said he wanted a language that was no longer used on a daily basis and that people "won't be able to understand and yet appreciate", desiring a sense of general equality.

=== Mythology ===
In the mythology, the god Bhunivelze (ブーニベルゼ, Būniberuze) seizes control of the mortal world by killing his mother, the creator goddess Mwynn (ムイン, Muin), who vanishes into the Unseen Realm. Believing that the mortality of the world is Mwynn's curse, Bhunivelze creates three new deities to search for the gate to the Unseen Realm so he can control both worlds. The first deity, Pulse (パルス, Parusu), is tasked with terraforming the world; the second deity, Etro (エトロ, Etoro), is discarded because of her resemblance to Mwynn; the third deity, Lindzei (リンゼ, Rinze), acts as Bhunivelze's protector. Bhunivelze then enters a deep sleep, while Lindzei and Pulse carry out their missions. Distraught at being abandoned, Etro kills herself, and humans are born from her blood. Once in the Unseen Realm, Etro finds Mwynn being consumed by a force called chaos, which threatens to destroy reality. As Mwynn fades, she tasks Etro with protecting the balance between the worlds. Etro gives humans pieces of chaos that become their "hearts". Because humans held chaos within them, they maintained the balance through their death and reincarnation. Since then, humans have either worshiped or feared Pulse and Lindzei, and refer to Etro as the goddess of death. The mythos' deities hold similar roles in each game's setting, but are not the same characters in a narrative sense.

A recurring race in the games are god-like beings created by Pulse and Lindzei to act as their servants in the mortal world. In the original mythos and the XIII games, the demigods are called fal'Cie /fælˈsiː/. They take the form of crystal-powered mechanical beings in the XIII games. In the universe of Type-0, they are both semi-sentient crystals and humanoid beings living among the people. The fal'Cie have the ability to imbue chosen humans with magical powers and assign them a task to complete either willingly or unwillingly. Final Fantasy XIII and Type-0 refer to these people as l'Cie /ləˈsiː/ and the task given to them as a Focus. In XIII, there are two possible outcomes for l'Cie: once their Focus is fulfilled, they can go into 'crystal stasis', transforming into a crystal statue, and gain eternal life, but if they fail they become mindless crystalline monsters called Cie'th (シ骸, Shi-gai). In Type-0, l'Cie are chosen by the crystal of their country, and given great power to fulfill their assigned Focus, but lose their memories if emotionally unstable. While not referred to as such using the original terminology, humans imbued with magic and burdened with a task exist in Final Fantasy XV, one of them being the main protagonist Noctis.

== Production ==
=== Creation ===
The concept for the Fabula Nova Crystallis series originated during late development on Final Fantasy X-2 and the original Kingdom Hearts. Discussing what to do once Final Fantasy XII was completed, Nomura, Shinji Hashimoto and Yoshinori Kitase decided to build upon the idea of multiple games connected by a single "central theme". Scenario writer Kazushige Nojima started writing the original mythology for the Fabula Nova Crystallis series in 2003, finishing it by February 2004. Nojima described his creation as the result of a wish to create something entirely new; a universe with its own mythos and legends. When he introduced the concept to other team members, they liked it and helped it grow. As with some of his other projects, Nojima incorporated themes of mythology due to his liking for and extensive research of Greek and Norse mythology. During his work, he received creative input from Kitase and Hashimoto, as well as Nomura, Tabata and Motomu Toriyama. Nojima wrote a series bible about the mythology, explaining concepts such as the fal'Cie and l'Cie and the feelings of the deities who created them. This bible became the basis for a video animated by Yusuke Naora's art team to showcase the mythos in 2011. None of the deities were depicted in human form in the video, as this would have undermined the developers' wishes for open interpretation by developers and players.

The central concept for Fabula Nova Crystallis came from the Compilation of Final Fantasy VII, a multimedia subseries featuring the world and characters of Final Fantasy VII. Whereas the common link in the Compilation was VII, the team chose to use "the tale of new crystals" for the new series, with the mythos connecting the games rather than an overarching narrative. Another key idea behind the mythos was to ease the production of future Final Fantasy games by providing an established universe. The individual directors are allowed to freely interpret the base mythology when they create their games. When referring to this freedom, Tabata has compared the mythos and the concept behind it to Greek mythology; a mythos with common themes and deities, but featuring many unrelated stories.

Toriyama based the story of Final Fantasy XIII around the mythos' deities and their direct relations to the world. Tabata and Nomura both focused on the human side of the story. Tabata chose to portray the divine elements from a historical standpoint in Type-0. Nomura created a modern-day setting similar to contemporary Earth in Final Fantasy XV, referring far less to the mythos' terminology. Nomura was also appointed as the main character designer for all entries in the subseries. In a 2007 interview, Hashimoto compared the planning of the Fabula Nova Crystallis series to film franchises such as Star Wars and The Lord of the Rings: an expansive brand on which to build multiple Final Fantasy titles planned in advance. The development of all games connected to the mythos was handled by Square Enix 1st Production Department. A trademark for Final Fantasy Haeresis XIII hinted at another entry, but the trademark expired in 2011 and the company did not renew.

=== Development ===
Final Fantasy XIII began development in February 2004. It began as a title for the PlayStation 2 under the codename "Colors World", but was moved onto PlayStation 3 after the positively received Crystal Tools engine demo in 2005 and the delayed release of Final Fantasy XII. The original titles in the series were Final Fantasy XIII and Versus XIII. Agito XIII was created later, when Tabata was looking for a new project after finishing Before Crisis: Final Fantasy VII. Originally titled Fabula Nova Crystallis Final Fantasy XIII, the project and original three titles were announced at E3 2006. Final Fantasy XIII and Versus XIII were intended to form the core of the series, with future games being a "facet" of XIII. Agito XIII and Versus XIII both began production in 2006. The subseries' title changed in 2011 when the "XIII" numeral was dropped as it "would have been an issue" following the rebranding of Agito XIII to Type-0.

XIII was developed by team members who had worked on Final Fantasy VII, VIII, X and X-2. It was first announced as a PS3 exclusive; late in its development, an Xbox 360 version was announced, significantly delaying its release. After the release of Final Fantasy XIII, the creators wanted to expand on the game's setting and tell more stories about the characters, so XIII-2 and Lightning Returns were developed. For these games, Japanese developer tri-Ace was brought in to help with the games' design and graphics. The three games and their respective tie-in media were referred to as the "Lightning Saga" by Square Enix staff after the games' central character. A port for Microsoft Windows was considered, but not followed up due to platform-specific concerns and the company's view of the video game market. Later, Final Fantasy XIII and its sequels would receive PC ports through Steam. While there was speculation that Fabula Nova Crystallis would end with Lightning Returns, Kitase repeatedly said there was still room for further titles beyond the XIII universe.

Agito XIII was handled by staff from Before Crisis. The game was originally being developed as an episodic mobile game. By 2008, Agito XIII had been moved onto the PlayStation Portable, then later renamed Final Fantasy Type-0. The stated reason for the change of title was that Final Fantasy XIII and Type-0 shared little besides the core mythos. Type-0's western release was delayed due to the flagging PSP market in western territories. A high-definition port to the same platforms as Final Fantasy XV was co-developed by Square Enix and HexaDrive, and was eventually announced for a western release. Tabata created Agito around his original ideas for Type-0 as a mobile title. Agito acted both as a prequel to Type-0 and as an alternate story set within its world. The game was co-developed by mobile game developer Tayutau K. K. Later, Chinese developer Perfect World were brought in to develop Awakening; it was the first Final Fantasy title licensed by Square Enix to an external company. The English version of Awakening closed in 2019 due to server changes, while the game as a whole was shut down in 2020 with the expiry of the licensing deal.

Versus XIII's development was headed by the team behind the console Kingdom Hearts games. Like XIII, the game was a PS3 exclusive. As early as 2007, Square Enix considered re-branding Versus XIII as a numbered entry in the main series due to the rapidly growing scale of the project. The game was eventually re-branded in 2011 as Final Fantasy XV. As part of its later marketing, XV was deliberately distanced from the Fabula Nova Crystallis brand to remove the consequent limitation on their target audience, although lore and design elements were retained. The game was also moved fully onto eighth generation consoles and developed using the company's new Luminous Studio engine. The PS3 version was abandoned due to concerns about the console's continued viability. Final Fantasy XV eventually had help from multiple developers, including HexaDrive, XPEC Entertainment and Umbra. In contrast to Final Fantasy XIII, Tabata decided against creating any sequels to XV, instead expanding the base game through DLC. The first season of DLC was well received, so a second season was commissioned. All but one of these later DLC episodes were canceled in 2018 following the decision by the team to focus on a new intellectual property.

=== Related media ===
The games have been complemented and expanded upon through other media. For Final Fantasy XIII, a small book of short stories titled Final Fantasy XIII – Episode Zero was released, first through the game's website and then as a print release in December 2009. It shows events prior to the game's opening. A second novella, Episode i, was published via XIII-2's official website, bridging the narrative gap between XIII and XIII-2. Alongside XIII-2's Japanese release, a book detailing events not shown or described in the game titled Fragments Before was released in December 2011 including Episode i; this would be followed up by Fragments After, released in June 2012. Only Episode i has received an official English release. Lightning Returns was also set to receive a prequel novel by Benny Matsuyama alongside the game's Japanese release in November 2013, but was later canceled due to the author falling ill. A three-part novella exclusive to Famitsu Weekly magazine titled Final Fantasy XIII Reminiscence: tracer of memories was released across June and July 2014. It was written by Daisuke Watanabe, who handled the scripts for the XIII games, and takes place immediately after the ending of Lightning Returns. Reminiscence was later released online.

Final Fantasy Type-0 received a manga adaptation illustrated by Takatoshi Shiozawa. It began publication in the November 2011 of Young Gangan and was collected into a single volume and released in April 2012. The manga was translated into English and released as part of the western collector's edition for Type-0 HD, available exclusively through Square Enix's online store. A second manga following one of the game's secondary characters, Final Fantasy Type-0 Side Story: Reaper of the Icy Blade, (Note: Fainaru Fantajī Reishiki Gaiden Hyouken no Shinigami (ファイナルファンタジー零式外伝 氷剣の死神)) began serialization in May 2012. The latter manga was created by Shiozawa under Nomura's supervision. The manga ended in January 2014, with a bonus chapter released in February of the same year. It was released in the west in July 2015, licensed by Yen Press. Two novels detailing an alternate version of Type-0, titled Final Fantasy Type-0: Change the World, (Note: (ファイナルファンタジー零式 Change the World)) were released in April and June 2012. Agito received another Change the World novel adaptation focusing on two of the game's supporting characters. Ultimania guides and companion books have been released for the majority of released games.

Final Fantasy XV similarly had additional media released around it, forming a dedicated multimedia expansion dubbed the "Final Fantasy XV Universe". The majority of its content fleshed out the background for XV's plot, which would have required multiple video games under normal circumstances. While comparing the XV Universe to the overall structure of Fabula Nova Crystallis, the game's director defined it as an attempt to make the narrative of XV work in current times rather than attempting to "reinvent" the original concept. An anime produced by Square Enix and A-1 Pictures, Brotherhood: Final Fantasy XV, details the backstories of the main cast and how they came to be journeying together. It was distributed online in the months leading up to the game's release. A CGI feature film produced by the same team as Advent Children, Kingsglaive: Final Fantasy XV, was released in July 2016 in Japan and in August in America; it focuses on the main character's father Regis Lucis Caelum, alongside original characters. The canceled DLC was turned into the novel Final Fantasy XV: The Dawn of the Future.

== Reception ==
The Fabula Nova Crystallis mythos has received mixed reactions from gaming sites. Hardcore Gamer's Brady Hale called the series "anything but ordinary" in the variety of games it featured. In an article concerning the 25th Anniversary event for the Final Fantasy series, Joystiq's Ben Gilbert called the Fabula Nova Crystallis mythos "occasionally bizarre and often beautiful". In 2014, Jeremy Parish of USGamer said the series was "much ado about nothing", stating that since the games shared a large amount of themes and plot points with the main series, there seemed little reason for a distinction. TechnoBuffalo's Ron Duwell, in an article concerning a documentary video on Final Fantasy XV, called the series "overly ambitious", but felt that it was worth Fabula Nova Crystallis "[imploding] upon itself" if Final Fantasy XV fulfilled its promises. Kat Bailey, writing for USGamer as part of her review for Final Fantasy XV, said that series fans were ready for the subseries to come to an end with the game's release. RPG Site's Chelsi Laire called the subseries "a series of successes and failures, but mostly the latter" due to its troubled development, but hoped that the company would revisit the brand in the future.

Speaking about the XIII games in particular, Parish suggested that their mixed reactions influenced the title changes of other games in the original series, giving the teams a chance to give those games more of their own identity. He also felt that the decision to expand the XIII storyline into multiple games "probably worked out just as well". The presentation of the mythos and its terms received mixed reactions in XIII, resulting in the production team toning down their use for XIII-2. Siliconera writer Spencer Yip, in his review of Lightning Returns, commented that the story and pace of the game was "muddled" by the mythos. In 2016, RPGFan writer Mike Salbato wrote a retrospective of the Final Fantasy XIII games and their version of Fabula Nova Crystallis: he felt that the lack of specific references to the mythos in XIII had harmed general comprehension, and that a reliance on foreknowledge made its sequels difficult to play as standalone titles. In contrast, the portrayal of the mythos in Type-0 was praised by RPG Site's Erren Van Duine in an import review of the title, with him saying that "elements such as l'Cie and fal'Cie are handled in much more interesting ways". When commenting on the lore of Final Fantasy XV, Andrew Reiner of Game Informer praised the story for sticking to basics and avoiding "[overwhelming] the player with lore or branching threads, something Final Fantasy XIII struggled with".

=== Individual titles ===
Aggregate review scores
Game	Metacritic
Final Fantasy XIII	(PS3) 83/100 (X360) 82/100 (PC) 65/100
Final Fantasy Type-0	(PS4) 72/100 (XONE) 72/100 (PC) 69/100
Final Fantasy XIII-2	(PS3) 79/100 (X360) 79/100 (PC) 75/100
Lightning Returns: Final Fantasy XIII	(PS3) 66/100 (X360) 69/100 (PC) 66/100
Final Fantasy Agito	N/A
Final Fantasy XV	(PS4) 81/100 (XONE) 83/100 (PC) 85/100
Final Fantasy Awakening	N/A

Final Fantasy XIII was positively received in Japanese magazines, garnering exceptionally high scores from both Famitsu and Dengeki PlayStation. In the west, the game was praised for its graphics, battle system, and music, but opinions were mixed about its story and it was criticized for its highly linear structure. XIII also won an award for best graphics in GamesRadar's 2012 Platinum Trophy Awards. XIII-2 received a positive reception overall, gaining perfect scores from Famitsu and Dengeki PlayStation, and high scores from most western sites. Common points of praise were its non-linear nature, improved battle system and graphics, while the main points of criticism were its story and characters, which were often called weak, confusing or both. Lightning Returns received mixed reviews, with its combat being highly praised, its graphics and time limit mechanic drawing mixed responses, and the story and characters being cited as poorly developed.

Type-0 had a highly positive reception in Japan, with it garnering near-perfect scores in Famitsu and Dengeki PlayStation. Import reviews were also fairly positive, sharing many points of praise with the Japanese reviews. Type-0 HD also received a positive reception in the west, with main praise going to the story, characters and action-based gameplay. Other aspects came in for criticism, such as elements of the graphics upgrade, the real-time strategy segments, and the localization. Western previews of Agito have also been positive, with critics agreeing that it looked good on the platform and worked well from a gameplay standpoint. Final Fantasy XV was positively received by many journalists; praise went to aspects of the story, the main characters, battle system and graphics, while the overarching plot, supporting cast and other technical elements such as the camera and late-game changes in gameplay were criticized.

=== Sales ===
Final Fantasy XIII broke sales records for the Final Fantasy franchise, selling 1.5 million units in Japan on its release day, and a further million a month after its North American release. XIII-2 was the most purchased title of 2011 in Japan upon release, and reached second and first place in sales charts in the United States and United Kingdom respectively. Lightning Returns had lower first-week sales than its predecessors, but still topped the sales charts in Japan, selling over 277,000 units in its first week and over 404,000 copies by the end of 2013. It ranked as third and eighth in the UK and US February sales charts respectively. Approximately 800,000 copies were sold by as of November 2014. The three XIII games have collectively sold 11 million units worldwide. Speaking of the decreasing success of the XIII games and their effect on the Fabula Nova Crystallis series on USGamer, Parish felt that the initial backlash received by XIII had turned the "XIII" moniker into "box office poison".

Type-0 sold over 472,000 units in its first week, and went on to sell over 740,000 units in Japan. The title was also added to the company's list of Ultimate Hits, re-releases of lucrative titles. Type-0 HD reached the top of the sales charts in its debut week, selling 93,000 units, though it ultimately performed poorly in Japan. It was among the ten top-selling games in March for the UK and US. By April, Type-0 HD had shipped over one million copies worldwide. Agito was highly successful in Japan, achieving 500,000 registered users within a week of release. By November of the year of release, the game had received one million downloads. Awakening met with commercial success in China, achieving two million downloads within its month of release. Upon its release, Final Fantasy XV sold five million copies worldwide through retail shipments and digital sales, breaking sales records for the Final Fantasy franchise. By May 2022, XV had sold ten million units worldwide across all versions, making it one of the bestselling Final Fantasy games of all time.

=== Official response ===
Speaking in a 2014 feature on the series, Kitase and Toriyama commented that the initial structure and goals of the project had worked against it, causing the mythos narrative to become unfocused and difficult for players to follow within a single game. In the aftermath, Square Enix decided to move away from the complex narrative style that had accompanied the mythos, instead focusing on telling more understandable standalone stories. Tabata described the decision to distance Final Fantasy XV from the mythos brand as a complicated but necessary one.
