= Selphie Tilmitt =

Character from Final Fantasy VIII

- Final Fantasy character
- Concept artwork of Selphie Tilmitt for Final Fantasy VIII, as drawn by Tetsuya Nomura.
- First game: Final Fantasy VIII (1999)
- Created by: Kazushige Nojima
- Designed by: Tetsuya Nomura
- Voiced by: EN: Molly Marlette; JA: Mayuko Aoki

In-universe information
- Race: Humanity
- Weapon: Nunchaku

Selphie Tilmitt (セルフィ・ティルミット, Serufi Tirumitto) is a character from the 1999 role-playing video game Final Fantasy VIII. She is introduced as a recent transfer student from Trabia Garden to its rival school Balamb Garden, a prestigious military academy for elite mercenaries (known as "SeeDs") and home to several of the game's major characters. She is also the pilot in command of the Ragnarok starship, the primary means of air transport for the player's party.

Selphie was the second character drawn by Final Fantasy VIII artist Tetsuya Nomura after the game's lead protagonist Squall Leonhart. The development team originally intended to program Selphie with some of the game's most powerful attacks. A younger version of Selphie appears as a supporting character in the Kingdom Hearts series, which was created by Nomura. Other appearances include the mobile game Final Fantasy Record Keeper as well as the Dissidia Final Fantasy fighting game series. Selphie has received a generally positive reception, being noted for her relatable personality as well as her carefree and energetic demeanour, although some critics did not respond well to her characterization as a childlike female character.

== Development ==
Selphie Tilmitt, along with most of Final Fantasy VIII's principal cast of characters, was designed by Tetsuya Nomura, who would then pass on his finalized character designs to the game's scenario writer Kazushige Nojima. Nomura came up with Selphie's initial design prior to the completion of his work on Squall Leonheart. Selphie is given a flip hairstyle which was popular in the United States during the latter years of the presidency of Dwight D. Eisenhower, an aesthetic design Nomura considered to be improper in real life. When Nomura first designed Selphie, he drew her in overalls, but he realized that none of the characters would be wearing a skirt. In the end, he gave Selphie a mini-skirt and let another character named Quistis wear pants.

Selphie is depicted in the game as 17 years old and stands at 156 cm (5 ft 1 1/2 in) tall. She wields a large pair of nunchaku in battle. In the European version of Final Fantasy VIII, her weapon is renamed as "Shinobou" due to censorship laws in the United Kingdom concerning the portrayal of ninja weapons in visual media which were instituted by James Ferman, the director of the British Board of Film Censors. Selphie's Limit Break, a special cinematic attack sequence, is based on a slot machine. If the player manages to line up the reels in a certain way, Selphie can cast a random spell numerous times or unleash powerful spells which are exclusive to her Limit Break phase, including a magical attack called The End which can defeat almost any enemy in the game. Selphie was intended to have two additional exclusive Limit Break abilities during the game's development; though they were shown during a game demo that came bundled with the 1998 action role-playing game Brave Fencer Musashi, they were never implemented in the final release due to time constraints and cannot be accessed through normal play.

A preadolescent version of Selphie appears in the Kingdom Hearts series, with the inaugural series installment in 2002 being the character's first voiced appearance. She is voiced by Mayuko Aoki in the Japanese version and Molly Marlette in the English version.

== Appearances ==
For Selphie's first appearance in Final Fantasy VIII, she encounters Squall while running late for class. She asks Squall to show her around as she is a recent transfer from Trabia Garden. During the Dollet exam, Selphie joins Squall's team after Seifer Almasy abandons them. She successfully graduates alongside Squall and Zell and becomes a SeeD, and the three are assigned to the same team. When Galbadia launches missiles at Trabia Garden, she reacts with outrage and helps destroy the missile base. She is depicted as active and energetic, although slightly clumsy. She participates in many extracurricular activities, such as planning the Garden Festival and running the school's online website, the Study Panel.

Throughout the game, she revisits her childhood closeness with Irvine Kinneas, who serves as her copilot on the Ragnarok. A recurring character moment involve Selphie singing a song about trains during the party's train journeys.

=== Other appearances ===
In the 2002 video game Kingdom Hearts, Selphie appears as a young resident of Destiny Islands and a friend of Sora. She is armed with a jump rope instead of nunchaku. Selphie returns in the 2005 sequel Kingdom Hearts II as Kairi's classmate, having no memory of Sora.

Selphie has appeared in several Final Fantasy franchise spin-off games, including playable appearances in titles like Dissidia Final Fantasy Opera Omnia and Final Fantasy Record Keeper.

== Promotion and merchandise ==
In 2004, action figures of Selphie alongside Squall and Rinoa were distributed in North America by Diamond Comics Distributors.

== Reception ==
Selphie has been mostly well-received by the general public. She has been the subject of creative activities engaged by video game enthusiasts, such as cosplay. Magazines have also called her as one of the best Final Fantasy characters.

Critical reception for the character has been generally positive, with some critics calling her one of the most appealing and memorable aspects of Final Fantasy VIII. Meagan Marie from Game Informer considered Selphie to be one of her "personal favorite" Final Fantasy female characters. Dave Smith from IGN praised Selphie as one of the game's few bright lights, highlighting her hairstyle and her cheerfulness as an effective foil for the angst-filled personalities of its cast. Jeremy Parish from USGamer called Selphie his favorite role-playing game character, going as far as calling her the first video game character he could relate to as a realistic human being, setting her apart from other game characters given the sharp contrast between her conduct and the rest of her team. Parish made the claim that she "broke the mold for RPG characters as either grim heroes or blank slates or a combination of the two". Matt Sainsbury from Digitally Downloaded felt that Selphie stood out to him as a physically attractive character, in spite of the graphical limitations of Final Fantasy VIII as a product of its time, because of her "cute, quirky hairstyle" and her attractive mini-dress outfit. David Lozada from GameRevolution considered Selphie's character arc, which sees her dealing with insecurity and childhood trauma in her own way, to be noteworthy because he found that "few other Final Fantasy games feature female character arcs that are as remarkable" as her growth into a confident, strong woman by the game's ending. WomenGamers gave a positive assessment of the character, noting that while others may underestimate Selphie's intellect due to her perky and energetic nature, she demonstrates that she is competent when a problematic situation arises and appears to be as smart as her prodigious comrade Quistis.

Several critics note that elements of Selphie's behavior and personality resemble that of other female characters within the Final Fantasy franchise and that she represented a common recurring character archetype used throughout related media. Commentary on this aspect of her character drew both positive and negative responses. Parish argued that Selphie never seemed "overbearing or forced" to him, unlike many other female characters in the series who also occupy the same "genki girl" niche. Sainsbury praised Selphie as the "original somewhat ditzy, super perky, brighten-up-your-day background character" archetype within the Final Fantasy franchise, which is continued by characters who appear in subsequent instalments like Rikku and Vanille. Conversely, Andy Kelly from PC Gamer recognized Selphie as the light-hearted Final Fantasy character archetype "who gets hit extra hard when something tragic inevitably happens", but found her to be "almost sickeningly friendly and good-natured", and her "bouncy and eager to please tendencies" unendearing.

=== Analysis ===
Selphie's role as a child figure was discussed by Mark Filipowich in an essay published in the 2018 book Queerness in Play. He observed that a lithe fighter archetype like Selphie is characterized as much by her offensive versatility as her helplessness. In terms of gender roles, Filipowich suggested that there is a looser gender script for a childlike character, unlike the maiden character archetype who may be constrained to a nurturing healer role or supporting the rest of the party with rogue-style tactics. Filipowich suggested that the child character archetype represents potential as opposed to limitation, and that female variants of the archetype seemingly have space to undergo character development independently of male party members. Alexa Ray Corriea noted that Selphie's appearance in the Kingdom Hearts series, where she is depicted as an actual child, fall into the same trope as other female characters present in its male-dominated setting, as none of them make enough of a significant impact within its narrative. Josh Tolentino from Destructoid used Selphie and her fascination with trains as a point of reference about linear game design in an analysis of the mechanics and systems typical of Japanese role-playing games.
