= Norg (disambiguation) =

Norg is a village in the Netherlands.

Norg may also refer to:

- NORG, a character from the video game Final Fantasy VIII
- Norg, a character from the TV show Power Rangers Operation Overdrive
