= Jun Akiyama (video game designer) =

Japanese video game designer

- 秋山 淳
- Born: 1973 (age 52–53); Japan
- Occupation: video game writer

Jun Akiyama (秋山 淳, Akiyama Jun; born 1973) is a Japanese video game event director and scenario writer who works at Square Enix. He joined the predecessor company Square in 1995. In his role as event planner for Final Fantasy VII, Akiyama was responsible for the story elements and cutscenes involving the characters Red XIII and Yuffie Kisaragi, respectively. During his work as the event director of Vagrant Story, he intended to make the transitions between gameplay and event scenes as smooth as possible. The fully polygonal graphics of the game entailed precise camera movements, character animations and the usage of different lens effects.

In late 1999, Akiyama watched the animated film Tarzan and pleaded with Kingdom Hearts director and story writer Tetsuya Nomura to join the game's team. He became the event planning director and one of the scenario writers, taking charge of the Tarzan-themed segment, among others. Akiyama tried to inject Disney-like humor into the game, such as a scene in which Donald Duck is flattened by an opening door. He also suggested Final Fantasy VIII character Squall Leonhart be renamed Leon to maintain suspense before his first on-screen appearance. In January 2002, Akiyama joined the Final Fantasy XII project as event director in charge of such aspects as camera movements, voice-overs and motions. When Yasumi Matsuno stepped down as the game's director in mid-2005, he expressed his high confidence in the remaining team members, among them Akiyama. Many of the story ideas that Akiyama came up with alongside scenario writer Daisuke Watanabe had to be abandoned in order to finish the game on time. For a time, Akiyama was the event planning director of Final Fantasy Versus XIII (which was later reworked into Final Fantasy XV).

== Works ==
Title	Release	System	Credit(s)
DynamiTracer	1996	Super Famicom	Event design
Final Fantasy VII	1997	PlayStation	Event planner, snowboard minigame planner
Final Fantasy Tactics	1997	PlayStation	Event planner
Vagrant Story	2000	PlayStation	Event director
Kingdom Hearts	2002	PlayStation 2	Event planning director, scenario writer
Final Fantasy Tactics Advance	2003	Game Boy Advance	Event script editor
Kingdom Hearts II	2005	PlayStation 2	Special thanks
Final Fantasy XII	2006	PlayStation 2	Event direction
Final Fantasy XII International Zodiac Job System	2007	PlayStation 2	Event direction
Final Fantasy Tactics A2: Grimoire of the Rift	2007	Nintendo DS	Special thanks
Final Fantasy XIII	2009	PlayStation 3, Xbox 360	Crystal Tools development staff
Final Fantasy XIV	2010	Windows	HQ cutscene production
World of Final Fantasy	2016	PlayStation 4, PlayStation Vita	Event director
Final Fantasy XV	2016	PlayStation 4, Xbox One	Special thanks
Final Fantasy XII The Zodiac Age	2017	PlayStation 4	Event director
