= Kingdom Hearts (video game) =

2002 video game

- North American cover art featuring the main characters, from top: Sora, Riku, Goofy, Kairi, and Donald
- Developer: Square
- Publishers: JP: Square; NA: Square Electronic Arts; PAL: Sony Computer Entertainment
- Director: Tetsuya Nomura
- Producers: Shinji Hashimoto; Yoshinori Kitase
- Programmers: Hiroshi Harata; Kentarou Yasui
- Artist: Tetsuya Nomura
- Writers: Jun Akiyama; Daisuke Watanabe; Kazushige Nojima
- Composer: Yoko Shimomura
- Series: Kingdom Hearts
- Platform: PlayStation 2
- Release: JP: March 28, 2002; NA: September 17, 2002; EU: November 15, 2002; AU: November 22, 2002; Final Mix: JP: December 26, 2002
- Genres: Action role-playing, platform game, hack and slash
- Mode: Single-player

Kingdom Hearts (Note: Japanese: キングダムハーツ, Hepburn: Kingudamu Hātsu) is a 2002 action role-playing game developed and published by Square for the PlayStation 2. It is the first game in the Kingdom Hearts series and is the result of a collaboration between Square and The Walt Disney Company. An expanded re-release of the game featuring new and additional content, Kingdom Hearts Final Mix, was released exclusively in Japan in December 2002. The Final Mix version of the game was later remastered in high definition and released globally as part of the Kingdom Hearts HD 1.5 Remix collection for the PlayStation 3. The game was later ported and released as part of the bundled Kingdom Hearts HD 1.5 + 2.5 Remix collection for PlayStation 4 in March 2017, Xbox One in February 2020, Windows in March 2021 and Nintendo Switch in February 2022.

The game combines characters and settings from Disney animated features with those from Square's Final Fantasy series, in addition to original characters and worlds created for the game. It follows the adventures of Sora, a cheerful teenager who fights against the forces of darkness alongside his allies, including Donald Duck, Goofy, and other Disney characters. The game was a departure from Square's standard role-playing games, introducing a substantial action and hack and slash element to the gameplay. The score was composed by Yoko Shimomura, with an all-star voice cast including many of the Disney characters' official voice actors. It was longtime Square character designer Tetsuya Nomura's first time in a directorial position.

Kingdom Hearts was a critical and commercial success and received praise for its unusual combination of action and role-playing elements, its unexpectedly harmonious mix of Square and Disney elements, and Shimomura's music. It is considered to be one of the greatest video games of all time, and was a large presence in the 2002 holiday season, receiving numerous year-end game awards, and went on to achieve Sony "Greatest Hits" status. The game's success spawned a franchise and numerous sequels, with the Kingdom Hearts series going on to ship over 36 million copies worldwide and becoming one of Square's most popular franchises. Kingdom Hearts is one of the best-selling PlayStation 2 games and the best-selling Disney video game.

== Gameplay ==
The main character, Sora, fights against Heartless. The heads-up display consists of a command menu at the bottom left of the screen, and Sora's health and magic meters on the right side.

Kingdom Hearts is influenced by its parent franchise, Final Fantasy, and carries gameplay elements over into its own action-based, hack and slash system. The main battle party consists of three characters: Sora, Donald Duck, and Goofy. Sora is directly controlled by the player from a third-person camera angle. All other party members are computer-controlled, though the player can customize their behavior to an extent through the pause menu. Donald and Goofy comprise the party in most areas, but many levels feature a character who may replace them. For instance, Jack Skellington joins Sora's party in Halloween Town, but cannot accompany the player elsewhere. In some worlds, the party changes its appearance, has abilities unique to that world, or both; the characters can fly in Neverland, gain aquatic forms in Atlantica which enable them to survive underwater, and wear Halloween costumes in Halloween Town to blend in with the locals.

Like traditional role-playing games, Kingdom Hearts features an experience point system that determines character development. As enemies are defeated, the player characters gain experience and grow stronger, gaining access to new abilities. Unlike other games of its genre, Kingdom Hearts allows a degree of character development customization through a short tutorial found at the beginning of the game. The tutorial allows the player to select from one of three main attributes―strength, defense, or magic―for Sora to excel in and one to lack in. By choosing certain options, the player may manipulate how Sora learns abilities, grows statistically, and gains levels. Donald, Goofy, and additional party members are assigned specific areas of strength from the outset. Donald excels in magic, while Goofy excels in defense and special attacks.

The game progresses linearly from one story event to the next, usually presented in cutscenes, though there are numerous side quests available that provide benefits to the characters. Players may also choose the order in which they tackle some areas. Most of the gameplay occurs on interconnected field maps where battles take place. Combat in Kingdom Hearts occurs in real time and involves pressing buttons to initiate attacks by the on-screen character. An action menu, similar to those found in Final Fantasy games, found at the bottom left of the screen provides other combat options such as using magic and items, although players can also assign selected magic spells that can be instantly used whilst holding the shoulder button. As players progress through the game, they can receive certain Disney characters as summons, including Dumbo, Bambi, Mushu, and Simba, who are unlocked through summon gems found in the worlds, and Tinker Bell and the Genie, who are unlocked after clearing the worlds of Neverland and Agrabah respectively. There is also a context-sensitive option at the bottom of the menu, usually used for interacting with the environment or performing special attacks. This menu is manipulated by using the right analog stick or digital pad, while movement is controlled by the left analog stick, allowing the player to navigate the menu while avoiding or approaching enemies.

Sora, along with his allies, possesses a Hit Point (HP) meter and a Magic Point (MP) meter, which increase as they gain experience and level up. The MP meter is divided into various segments that are used up whenever a character performs magic, with more powerful magic consuming more MP, and can be replenished by performing melee attacks or using items. The HP meter determines the character's health and reduces when they take damage, although it can be replenished by using healing items or spells. If one of Sora's allies runs out of health, they will be knocked out temporarily until healed. However, if Sora loses all of his health, the game ends and the player must resume play from the beginning of an area or boss. Defeating enemies causes various orbs to fall: green orbs which replenish health, blue orbs which restore MP, and yellow orbs which represent Munny, the game's currency, and can be used to purchase new items.

=== Gummi Ship ===
The Gummi Ship is the mode of travel between the various worlds in the game. The gameplay for piloting the vessel is different from the rest of the game, switching to a rail shooter format in which the player controls the Gummi Ship from a rear third-person perspective as it travels in an outer space setting. While traveling, the player must avoid obstacles and defend against enemy ships that attempt to destroy the vessel by firing missiles or ramming it. Surviving the route allows access to the next world. Once the player's Gummi Ship is destroyed, it will have the option to either return to the world selection menu or retry the level. At the beginning of the game, there are few options available to customize the vessel, but as the game progresses, new weapons, engines, and armor become available. Different pre-designed blueprints can be found throughout the game that can be used to quickly construct Gummi Ships. Geppetto also gives the player different Gummi Ship designs based on the number of Heartless defeated. From the start, the player can travel between worlds by using "Normal Drive", which initiates the rail shooter-like minigame. Later in the game, Sora can acquire a "Warp Drive", which allows instant travel between previously visited worlds without having to play the minigame. However, worlds that have not been visited cannot be accessed with Warp Drive and must be discovered normally first.

== Plot ==
=== Setting ===
The universe of Kingdom Hearts is a collection of various levels, referred to as "worlds", through which the player must progress. Fourteen worlds are featured, out of which thirteen can be accessed; one, Disney Castle, is shown in cutscenes, and additional worlds are mentioned by various characters, but are inaccessible due to being destroyed by the Heartless. Ten worlds are based on films from the Disney animated features canon, and the other four were created by Square specifically for the game.

The graphics and characters of each world were designed to resemble the artwork and style of the Disney film they are based on. Each Disney world is inhabited by characters from the film: for instance, Hercules and Philoctetes appear in Olympus Coliseum, and Aladdin, Jasmine, and Jafar in Agrabah. Each world is disconnected from the others and exists separately, and with few exceptions, most characters in the world are unaware of other ones. Players travel from one world to another via the Gummi Ship.

The worlds created specifically for the game mirror the overall appearance of the other worlds and feature either new characters or ones from several Final Fantasy games. These worlds include the Destiny Islands, the home world of Sora, Riku, and Kairi, and where the story opens; Traverse Town, which serves as a hub world and refuge for those whose worlds were destroyed; Hollow Bastion, home of several Final Fantasy characters; and the End of the World, a large, dark world created from the remnants of various worlds consumed by the Heartless. The main characters, Sora, Donald, and Goofy, travel from world to world to seal each world's "Keyhole", which protects it from the Heartless and from destruction, while trying to minimize their interaction with characters of other worlds to maintain a balance of separation, which sometimes requires them to change their physical appearance to blend in with the world's inhabitants.

=== Characters ===
The collaboration between Disney and Square resulted in a mixture of familiar Disney and Square characters, as well as several new characters created and designed by Tetsuya Nomura. The primary protagonist of the game is Sora, a 14-year-old boy chosen to wield the Keyblade—a weapon which is a cross between a key and a sword—to battle darkness. The game also features two friends from his home world, Riku and Kairi. For most of the game, Sora is joined by Donald Duck and Goofy, who are a court wizard and captain of Disney Castle's royal guard respectively, and were sent to find the Keyblade wielder, joining forces with Sora to search for their King, Mickey Mouse, while Sora searches for Kairi and Riku. The primary antagonist is Ansem, who seeks power and knowledge by using the Heartless, while Maleficent (from the 1959 film Sleeping Beauty) leads a group of Disney villains that seek to use the Heartless for their own gain.

As a game meant to explore the fictional universes of various Disney films, over one hundred Disney characters are featured in various capacities. While many serve as major characters in the story, others appear in cameo roles, such as the One Hundred and One Dalmatians being part of a side-quest where the player receives rewards for collecting and returning the 99 puppies to Pongo and Perdita. Most worlds also feature a Disney villain whom the player must defeat.

Square also incorporated several characters from the Final Fantasy series into the game, though altered to fit the game's story. Destiny Islands features younger versions of Tidus and Wakka from Final Fantasy X (2001) and Selphie Tilmitt from Final Fantasy VIII (1999). In Traverse Town, the player encounters Squall Leonhart, also known in-game as Leon, from Final Fantasy VIII, as well as Aerith Gainsborough, Cid Highwind, and Yuffie Kisaragi from Final Fantasy VII (1997). Rikku from Final Fantasy X was originally set to appear, but was replaced by Yuffie. Cloud Strife and Sephiroth from Final Fantasy VII make appearances in Olympus Coliseum, where the player can fight them in tournaments. The emphasis on characters from later Final Fantasy installments stems from Nomura's hesitation to use characters he did not design. The game also uses other Final Fantasy icons, such as the Moogles, who mediate item synthesis.

=== Story ===
Sora, Riku, and Kairi build a raft to explore worlds beyond their home of Destiny Islands. On the night before their planned voyage, the Heartless attack the islands, separating the trio. Before the Heartless consume the world, Sora mysteriously obtains the Keyblade, a weapon effective against them. Meanwhile, King Mickey leaves his own world to investigate the growing Heartless threat, instructing Donald and Goofy to find the "key" that will protect the worlds from encroaching darkness. Donald and Goofy travel by Gummi Ship to Traverse Town, where they meet Sora after he is displaced by the destruction of the islands. The three decide to travel together: Donald and Goofy to find Mickey, and Sora to find Riku and Kairi. They journey across various worlds, sealing their "Keyholes" to prevent the world's hearts from being consumed by the Heartless. Meanwhile, a group of Disney villains led by Maleficent seek the seven Princesses of Heart to unlock the final Keyhole leading to Kingdom Hearts, the source of all hearts and a repository of knowledge and power. Maleficent also finds and recruits Riku by manipulating him into believing that Sora abandoned him.

Sora and his companions eventually reach Hollow Bastion, Maleficent's headquarters, where Riku takes the Keyblade from Sora, revealing himself to be its intended wielder, while Sora had received it only in Riku's absence. Donald and Goofy reluctantly leave Sora in accordance with the king's orders, but later return after Sora declares that his heart draws strength from his friends, allowing him to reclaim the Keyblade. After defeating Maleficent, Sora finds Kairi's comatose body and confronts Riku, who has been possessed by Ansem, the mastermind behind Maleficent's actions. Ansem reveals that Kairi is the seventh Princess of Heart and that her heart entered Sora's body when the Destiny Islands were destroyed. After defeating the possessed Riku, Sora sacrifices himself using Ansem's Keyblade, which can unlock hearts, to release both his own heart and Kairi's. Kairi's heart returns to her body, completing the final Keyhole, while Sora becomes a Heartless. Kairi recognizes Sora's Heartless, and the light within her heart restores him to human form.

Sora and his friends travel to the End of the World, the remains of worlds consumed by the Heartless, and confront Ansem as he reaches the door to Kingdom Hearts. After Sora defeats him, Ansem calls upon Kingdom Hearts, believing that darkness lies beyond the door. Instead, the door opens to reveal light, which destroys Ansem. Mickey and Riku appear on the other side of the door, and help Sora and his friends close it. Sora and Mickey then seal the door from opposite sides using their keyblades, leaving Mickey and Riku trapped in the Realm of Darkness. The worlds consumed by the Heartless are restored, including the Destiny Islands. As Kairi returns home, Sora is forced to part with her. Sora, Donald, and Goofy resolve to continue on to find Riku and Mickey.

== Development ==
The initial idea for Kingdom Hearts began with a discussion between Shinji Hashimoto and Hironobu Sakaguchi about Super Mario 64. They were planning to make a game with three dimensional movement like Super Mario 64, but believed that only characters as popular as Disney's could be as successful as a Mario game. Tetsuya Nomura, overhearing their conversation, volunteered to lead the project and the two producers agreed to let him direct. A chance meeting between Hashimoto and a Disney executive in an elevator—Square and Disney having previously had offices in the same building in Tokyo—allowed Hashimoto to pitch the idea directly to Disney. Disney initially proposed basing the game exclusively around Disney properties, however Nomura rejected many of these proposals, instead insisting on his vision of a game with an original main character and universe. The production team consisted of over one hundred members from both Square and Disney. The game began development in February 2000 and originally focused more on the gameplay with a simple story to appeal to Disney's target age range. After Sakaguchi told Nomura the game would be a failure if it did not aim for the same level as the Final Fantasy series, he began to develop the story further. When choosing the Disney worlds to include in the game, Nomura and his team tried to pick worlds that had distinctively different looks. They also tried to take into account worlds with Disney characters that would be interesting. Thanks to support from Disney's then-president and current chairman and chief executive Bob Iger, the team had few restrictions on which worlds they could use from the Disney franchises. However, they tried to remain within each character's boundaries set by their respective Disney films. In a 2013 interview, Nomura stated the name of the game was inspired by Disney Theme Parks, particularly Animal Kingdom, which had recently opened when development on the game began. Nomura initially intended to name the game Kingdom, however Square and Disney were unable to secure the trademark for the name. Later on, when the development team began to think about "hearts" as a core part of the story, it was decided to combine the two to form the title Kingdom Hearts. Outside contractors Telecom Animation Film Company and Kazuhide Tomonaga helped animate the game by being the animation supervisors.

Additional content was added to the North American release that was absent in the initial Japanese release: new optional bosses, one of which, Kurt Zisa, was named after the winner of the official website's "Name-In-Game" sweepstakes, an extra difficulty level, and a teaser of Kingdom Hearts II accessible by meeting certain criteria. Nomura included the teaser to gauge fan reaction to the possibility of a sequel; he felt that if the idea was unpopular, then it would be best to leave certain events in the game unexplained. The new content was later added to the Japanese re-release Kingdom Hearts Final Mix. Final Mix included further additional content such as new items, cutscenes, and enemies, such as a new secret boss that sets up the sequel. The new content further hinted at plotlines that would be explained in sequels. Some content omitted from Kingdom Hearts was later added into Kingdom Hearts II. A world based on The Lion King, for instance, was unfeasible due to the difficulties involved programming Sora's quadrupedal lion form. Due to time constraints, the developers left out an optional boss battle, similar to the Sephiroth battle, against Tifa Lockhart. She was later included in Kingdom Hearts II as a more developed character.

=== Audio ===
==== Music ====
Yoko Shimomura composed and produced the music of Kingdom Hearts. While there are arranged melodies derived from previous Disney films, most of the soundtrack consists of original themes written specifically for the game by Shimomura. The opening orchestration and ending credits theme were arranged and orchestrated by Kaoru Wada and performed by the New Japan Philharmonic Orchestra. The main vocal theme for the original Japanese release is titled "Hikari" (光). The English version of "Hikari", "Simple and Clean", was used in the Western releases and the Japanese re-release, Final Mix. Both versions were composed and performed by Hikaru Utada. Her involvement, along with the Japanese song title, was announced in January 2002. Utada was the only singer Nomura had in mind for the Kingdom Hearts theme song. This marked the first time Utada had produced a song for a video game. The single, "Hikari", was released in Japan on March 20, 2002 and proved to be very popular; by August 2002, it had sold over 860,000 copies in Japan. The Kingdom Hearts soundtrack was released on a two CD set on March 27, 2002, in Japan and a year later in the United States. The soundtrack was later included in the Kingdom Hearts Original Soundtrack Complete, which was released in Japan on March 28, 2007. Music from Kingdom Hearts was also included in Shimomura's best works compilation album Drammatica.

==== Voice cast ====
Kingdom Hearts featured well-known voice actors for both the Japanese and English versions. The Japanese version featured Miyu Irino as Sora, Risa Uchida as Kairi, and Mamoru Miyano as Riku. Other voice actors included Koichi Yamadera as Donald Duck, Hideo Ishikawa as Leon, and Maaya Sakamoto as Aerith. A special effort was made to preserve the official voice actors of characters from the Disney films used in Kingdom Hearts, including Tony Anselmo, Bill Farmer, and Wayne Allwine as Donald Duck, Goofy, and Mickey Mouse, respectively. Other actors who reprised their roles included Tony Goldwyn as Tarzan, James Woods as Hades, Jodi Benson as Ariel, Kathryn Beaumont as Alice and Wendy Darling, Scott Weinger as Aladdin, Linda Larkin as Princess Jasmine, Gilbert Gottfried as Iago, Pat Carroll as Ursula, John Fiedler as Piglet, Chris Sarandon as Jack Skellington, and Kenneth Mars as King Triton. Some of the voice actors from the related television series or direct-to-video sequels were chosen over the original voice actors from films, where applicable, such as Dan Castellaneta as Genie, rather than Robin Williams. The English version featured Haley Joel Osment as Sora, David Gallagher as Riku, and Hayden Panettiere as Kairi. Other voice actors included Billy Zane as Ansem, Christy Carlson Romano as Yuffie, David Boreanaz as Leon, Sean Astin as Hercules, Lance Bass as Sephiroth, and Mandy Moore as Aerith.

=== Promotion ===
Kingdom Hearts was announced at the Electronic Entertainment Expo in May 2001. Initial details were that it would be a collaboration between Square and Disney Interactive and would feature worlds developed by both companies and Disney characters. New characters were designed by Nomura and included Sora, Riku, Kairi, and the Heartless. A playable demo was available at the Tokyo Game Show in 2001. The gameplay of the demo showcased many action role-playing game elements that would be included in the final product. To help market the English release of the game, Square launched the official website in April 2002, which featured trailers, a "Name-In-Game" sweepstakes, and other Internet content. On May 14, 2002, a press release announced a list of the English voice actors. The list included Haley Joel Osment, David Gallagher, and Hayden Panettiere as the three new characters introduced in the game. It also announced that many of the Disney characters would be voiced by the official voice actors from their respective Disney films. Other marketing efforts included auctions of the game and related items before the North American release and a Consumer Demo Day in San Francisco, California.

== Re-releases ==
Multiple versions of Kingdom Hearts have been released. The first was the original Japanese release, followed by the international version of the game released outside of Japan, which included gameplay tweaks and additional content such as several post-game bosses not found in the Japanese release.

=== Final Mix ===
An enhanced re-release of the game, Kingdom Hearts Final Mix, was originally released exclusively in Japan on December 26, 2002. Final Mix incorporates the additional content added in the international release and also features new enemies, weapons, abilities, items, gameplay tweaks, and other additional content, as well as a new post-game boss and new cutscenes intended to further clarify the game's plot. Dialogue in the original Japanese release of Final Mix is in English with Japanese subtitles, with the game initially advertised as a way for Japanese players to experience the new content added to the International version of the game. At launch, Final Mix was packaged with either a deck of Kingdom Hearts playing cards or a special music CD. A limited "Platinum Edition" was later released with a Sora action figure, a sticker set, and sketches of several main characters.

Final Mix was first released outside Japan as part of the Kingdom Hearts HD 1.5 Remix collection in 2013.

=== HD 1.5 Remix ===
During August 2011, Nomura expressed desire to release a high-definition rerelease of the game, though he had yet to confirm such plans. In September 2012, Square Enix announced Kingdom Hearts HD 1.5 Remix, a compilation for the PlayStation 3, that includes both Kingdom Hearts Final Mix and Kingdom Hearts Re:Chain of Memories in HD and trophy support. The character models from Kingdom Hearts 3D: Dream Drop Distance were used as a base for the game's characters. The gameplay of the original Kingdom Hearts was modified to play more like Kingdom Hearts II. Additionally, the collection includes HD cinematic scenes from Kingdom Hearts 358/2 Days. It was released in Japan on March 14, 2013, in North America on September 10, 2013, on September 12, 2013, for Australia, and September 13, 2013, for Europe.

In June 2013, Nomura stated that the original game assets for Kingdom Hearts had been lost some time ago. He explained, "[The game data] was lost, so we had to research, and we had to dig out from the actual game what was available and recreate everything for HD. We had to recreate all the graphics and it was actually not that easy".

In October 2016, Square Enix announced a single-disc compilation release of Kingdom Hearts HD 1.5 Remix and Kingdom Hearts HD 2.5 Remix for the PlayStation 4. It was released on March 9, 2017, in Japan, and was released on March 28, 2017, in North America, and March 31, 2017, in Europe and Australia. A piece of free downloadable content for the PS4 version released in June 2017 added a Theater mode for Kingdom Hearts Final Mix; this was included by default in later ports of the compilation.

On November 14, 2019, Square Enix announced that Kingdom Hearts HD 1.5 + 2.5 Remix would be released on Xbox One on February 18, 2020, marking the Xbox debut of the first two Kingdom Hearts games and spinoffs.

== Related media ==
Both Square and Disney also released numerous types of merchandise before and after the release of the game. Merchandise ranged from toys and figurines to clothing items and books. Like the Final Fantasy games, Square released an Ultimania book on Kingdom Hearts in Japan following the release of the game and a revised edition following the release of Final Mix. In North America, a strategy guide was released by Brady Games. It featured a comprehensive walkthrough and a sticker activity journal. A manga series based on the game was released in Japan and the United States. A novel series also based on the game was released in Japan. It was authored by Tomoco Kanemaki and illustrated by Shiro Amano. The novel series consists of two volumes and was released in North America on March 25, 2008.

The game was adapted into a manga by Shiro Amano. The story follows the events that took place in the game with a few minor differences to account for the loss of interactivity a video game provides. Some events that took place in the Final Mix version were also included. The manga was originally serialized in Japan by Enterbrain's Famitsū PS2, but has since been released worldwide in four volumes. The volumes have been published in English in the United States by Tokyopop. The first volume was released on October 11, 2005, and the fourth volume was released on July 10, 2006. The entire series was later released in a boxed set on October 10, 2006. The manga series has had moderate success. The first volume was ranked 95th in USA Today's "Top 150 best sellers" during the week of its release. IGN praised Amano's artwork and commented on wanting to replay the game after reading. They criticized the lack of new content and stated the transition from game to print lost most of the story's appeal. The series was followed by others based on the game's sequels: Kingdom Hearts: Chain of Memories and Kingdom Hearts II.

== Reception ==
Kingdom Hearts sold very well. During the first two months of its North American release, it was one of the top three highest-selling video games and was among the top selling titles during the 2002 Christmas and holiday season. In November 2002, UBS Warburg listed it as the 6th highest console game in terms of sales during the week of November 5. At the end of April 2003, Square announced that Kingdom Hearts had sold its millionth copy in the United States, which made it eligible for PlayStation's "Greatest Hits" status, and over 3.0 million worldwide. Sales reached 1.2 million in Japan in the first quarter of 2004, and broke 4.0 million worldwide. In December 2005, the NPD Group listed it as "one of the top ten best-selling PlayStation 2 titles of all time in North America". By July 2006, Kingdom Hearts had sold through 2.6 million copies and earned $100 million in the United States alone. Next Generation ranked it as the seventh highest-selling game launched for the PlayStation 2, Xbox, or GameCube between January 2000 and July 2006 in that country. As of December 2006, Kingdom Hearts had shipped over 5.6 million copies worldwide with 1.1 million in PAL regions, 1.5 million in Japan, and 3.0 million in North America. As of 2006, the original game and the Final Mix version had sold 6 million copies on PS2. As of March 2022, the Kingdom Hearts series has shipped more than 36 million copies worldwide.

=== Critical response ===
Reception

Aggregate score
Aggregator	Score
Metacritic	85/100

Review scores
Publication	Score
1Up.com	A−
Electronic Gaming Monthly	25.5/30
Eurogamer	8/10
Famitsu	9/10, 9/10, 9/10, 9/10
Game Informer	9.5/10
GamePro	4.5/5
GameSpot	8.2/10
GameSpy	4/5
GamesRadar+	87%
GameZone	9.1/10
IGN	9/10
Official U.S. PlayStation Magazine	4.5/5
X-Play	4/5
Entertainment Weekly	B+

Awards
Publication	Award
GameSpot	Best Crossover Since Capcom vs. SNK
G4TV	Best Story
International Game Developers Association	Excellence in Visual Arts
IGN	Best Art Style/Direction

The game received generally positive reviews. In IGN's Best of 2002 awards, it was nominated for "PS2's Best Game of 2002 Editor's Choice Award" and was a runner up for "PS2's Best Game of 2002 Reader's Choice Award". In 2007, the website listed Kingdom Hearts as the 22nd best PlayStation 2 game of all time. Critics commended the visuals and hybrid action-adventure and role-playing feel to the game. IGN named it "Best Art Style/Direction", runner-up for "Best CG Graphics", and honorable mention for "Best Animation" in IGN's 2003 list of "Best Looking Games on PS2". GameSpy listed Kingdom Hearts twice in its "Top 25 Video Game Cinematic Moments". GamePro stated that the graphics were "gorgeous", giving them high marks. The audio was also praised, particularly the quality of the voice-overs and musical score. GamePro had positive comments on the overall audio and gave that aspect a perfect score.

Reception for the gameplay was mixed. Many reviews complained that the camera was at times frustrating and the Gummi Ship portions were out of place. GameSpot cited "tedious" gameplay and Gummi Ship sections as "pale imitations of the Star Fox series", but stated that the combat was fun, particularly the boss fights. Dengeki Online commented on the camera controls, saying that the camera would often run into objects while being rotated by the player. GamePro compared the battle system to "old N64 Zelda games" and had positive comments about Donald and Goofy's artificial intelligence.

The mix of Square and Disney elements also attracted acclaim. GameSpot commented that the concept of mixing the serious elements of Final Fantasy with the lighter elements of Disney seemed impossible, but was pulled off quite well. Because of that they awarded Kingdom Hearts "Best Crossover Since Capcom vs. SNK" in their 2002 Best and Worst of the Year awards. GameSpy noted that the periodic departure from the main plot into the Disney side stories was disappointing, and when the original plot builds to a climax, "the story fails to gel thanks to a confusing mish-mash of vague terms and symbolism that probably made more sense in the director's head than in this final product". Aside from the plot, they stated that the overall package was worth playing through to the end. G4TV awarded it "Best Story" at their 2003 G-Phoria awards show. Fan response was also positive; Kingdom Hearts was voted as the 19th best game of all time by readers of the Japanese magazine Famitsu, 16th by the users of website GameFAQs, and 92nd by IGN users. Kingdom Hearts ranked ninth on IGN's most recent "Top 25 PS2 Games of All Time" list. It ranked first on GamesRadar's "Top 7 Disney Games" list in 2009. It was also a nominee for the Best Game Award from the CESA Game Awards for 2001–2002. In the making of the 2004 video game Fullmetal Alchemist and the Broken Angel the developers, Racjin, looked at other titles for inspiration, particularly Kingdom Hearts when making the game.

During the 6th Annual Interactive Achievement Awards, the Academy of Interactive Arts & Sciences nominated Kingdom Hearts for "Console Role-Playing Game of the Year" and outstanding achievement in "Animation", "Art Direction", and "Character or Story Development".

== Sequels ==
Kingdom Hearts was followed by several sequels, becoming the first game in the Kingdom Hearts series. It was followed by a direct sequel, Kingdom Hearts: Chain of Memories, on the Game Boy Advance, which was released in Japan on November 11, 2004. Kingdom Hearts II is the third game in the series, set one year after Chain of Memories, and was released in Japan on December 22, 2005, for PlayStation 2. Like the first game it was re-released as Kingdom Hearts II Final Mix alongside a PS2 remake of Chain of Memories. A Kingdom Hearts game was developed exclusively for Verizon Wireless's broadband service V CAST, and was released on October 1, 2004, in Japan and on February 4, 2005, in the United States. In November 2008, Kingdom Hearts Coded was released for mobile phones in Japan, the game takes place after the events of Kingdom Hearts II. A follow-up, Kingdom Hearts 358/2 Days, was developed for the Nintendo DS and released in Japan on May 30, 2009, and in North America on September 29, 2009. A prequel was released in Japan on January 9, 2010, entitled Kingdom Hearts Birth by Sleep, for the PlayStation Portable, which takes place 10 years before the events of Kingdom Hearts. The following title in the series was Kingdom Hearts 3D: Dream Drop Distance for the Nintendo 3DS, released in 2012. At E3 2013, Kingdom Hearts III was announced to be in development for the PlayStation 4 and Xbox One, before being released in January 2019, followed by a downloadable content expansion titled Kingdom Hearts III Re Mind in early 2020. The following title, Kingdom Hearts: Melody of Memory, set after the events of Re Mind, was then released in Japan on November 11, 2020, and worldwide two days later.

During Square Enix's 20th anniversary event for the franchise in April 2022, a mobile title, Kingdom Hearts Missing-Link, was announced for iOS and Android devices, with a closed beta arriving in August, while the next mainline installment, Kingdom Hearts IV, was also revealed to be in development. In May 2025, Missing-Link was cancelled.
