= Squall Leonhart =

Protagonist in Final Fantasy VIII

- Final Fantasy character
- Squall Leonhart Dissidia artwork by Tetsuya Nomura wielding his gunblade
- First game: Final Fantasy VIII (1999)
- Created by: Kazushige Nojima
- Designed by: Tetsuya Nomura
- Voiced by: English: David Boreanaz (Kingdom Hearts); Doug Erholtz (Kingdom Hearts II – present); Japanese: Hideo Ishikawa

In-universe information
- Alias: Leon (Kingdom Hearts series)
- Weapon: Gunblade

Squall Leonhart (Japanese: スコール・レオンハート, Hepburn: Sukōru Reonhāto) is a character and the main protagonist of Final Fantasy VIII, a role-playing video game that was produced by Square, now Square Enix. Within the game's plot, Squall is a 17-year-old student at Balamb Garden, a prestigious military academy for elite mercenaries known as "SeeD". Forced into becoming the Commander (委員長, Iinchō; lit. "Chairman") due to his outstanding skills, Squall befriends his peers, who he eventually leads in battle against Ultimecia, and falls in love with Rinoa Heartilly. These relationships, combined with the game's plot, gradually change him from being a loner to an open, caring person. Squall has appeared in several other games, including Chocobo Racing, Itadaki Street Special, and the Kingdom Hearts series as the older mentor-like figure Leon (レオン, Reon).

Squall was designed by Tetsuya Nomura with input from game director Yoshinori Kitase. He was modeled after the actor River Phoenix. Squall's weapon, the gunblade, was made so it would be difficult to master. To ensure players understand Squall's silent attitude, Kazushige Nojima made the character's thoughts open to them. Squall's first voiced appearance is in the first Kingdom Hearts game, in which he is voiced by Hideo Ishikawa in Japanese and by David Boreanaz in English; Doug Erholtz has since assumed the role for later English-speaking appearances.

Squall has received mixed reaction from critics, with some judging him poorly in comparison with other Final Fantasy heroes due to his coldness and angst, and others praising his character development. The character's relationship with Rinoa has been notably praised and has often been given parallels to fellow character Laguna Loire who comes across as his opposite due to their contrasting personalities.

== Creation ==
While previous games in the Final Fantasy franchise involved an ensemble cast, for Final Fantasy VIII the Square staff decided to create a story centered around a hero and the heroine according to director Yoshinori Kitase. The rest of the characters were created to support the relationship between the duo. When asked about what is one thing Kitase would change about the game, he mentioned the FH concert where Rinoa Heartily mocks Squall by mimicking his mannerisms and she dodges after he raises his hand at her. Writer Kasushige Nojima was against this action, claiming a man should not hit a girl. Square's Hiroki Chiba said the scene in which Squall and Rinoa embrace in space is his favorite in the Final Fantasy franchise due to the use of Faye Wong's song "Eyes On Me" in the background and because he had to adjust every frame to make the scene work.

The first illustration of Squall was used to create the world around him. The game's logo that depicted Squall embracing Rinoa was left open for interpretation by players. After Nojima created the scenario, Nomura created the game's introduction movie mostly on his own, which left a major positive reaction on the Square staff. In Final Fantasy VIII, Nojima wanted to give players insight into Squall's thoughts in contrast to VII, which encouraged players to speculate on them. According to Nojima, the development staff made Squall "cool". In the game, it is implied the character Laguna Loire is Squall's father, but Square Enix has never confirmed this idea. Nomura designed Squall to contrast with Laguna; while Laguna is seen as a friendly man, Squall is distant and silent. The staff found this problematic, and thus Squall was given a character arc of him opening up to others to make the story easier to make fitting for a lone wolf. While at first the characters' stories run parallel, they would ultimately clash as conceptualized by Nomura.

In the original Japanese game, Squall has a tendency to respond negatively to other characters' comments by using sarcastic remarks like "well, excuse me". In the English localization, this was turned into the catchphrase "whatever".

=== Design ===
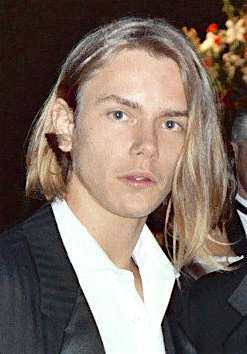
Squall was inspired by late actor River Phoenix.

Squall Leonhart was the first character Nomura designed for Final Fantasy VIII; he was inspired by actor River Phoenix, although Nomura said "nobody understood it". Squall is 177 cm (5 ft 10 in) tall, and initially had long hair and a feminine appearance. The scar on Squall's forehead was also left ambiguous, although Nomura said it was important for him. After objections from Kitase, Nomura made the character more masculine and added a scar across Squall's brow and the bridge of his nose to make him more recognizable similar to Cloud Strife's striking spiky hair from Final Fantasy VII, leaving its cause up to scenario writer Kazushige Nojima.

Nomura's design of Squall included a fur lining along his jacket collar as a challenge for the game's full motion video designers. Nomura created Squall's gunblade (ガンブレード, Ganburēdo) and its silver accessories. The weapon is a sword with components of a revolver that send vibrations through the blade when they are triggered; this inflicts additional damage as Squall strikes an enemy if the player presses the R1 trigger on the controller. Although the weapon was intended as a novel way for players to control weapons in battle, Nomura said he feels it looks odd in retrospect and that it was very difficult to master. According to other staff members, Nomura's idea with the Gunblade was to combine the two weapons and expand the sense of strength.

=== Portrayal ===
Squall's older and more androgynous persona from Kingdom Hearts was based on rejected sketches from Final Fantasy VIII.

Squall is unvoiced in Final Fantasy VIII, which does not use voice acting. In Kingdom Hearts, Squall is known as Leon and is voiced by David Boreanaz in the English version of the game and Hideo Ishikawa in the Japanese version. Squall returns in Kingdom Hearts II, where he is voiced in the English version by Doug Erholtz. Erholtz stated that he had a "fun journey" voicing Leon and that it was a "really fun role to play".

For the Kingdom Hearts series, Nomura decided to use Squall as a mentor character to newcomer Sora. Event planner Jun Akiyama persuaded Nomura to change Squall's name to Leon in order to make his introduction more surprising to the players, as he is first mentioned in a letter from Mickey Mouse. The last name Leonhart was removed for unspecified reasons. Some parts of his design were changed to reference Rinoa's, most noticeably the wings in his jacket in order to signify that something happened between the two in the past. However, the real reason for the two being split was because Nomura had problems writing Rinoa out of all Final Fantasy VIII characters. Leon's design was revised to be more effeminate using the original sketches from Final Fantasy VIII that only appeared in the game's logo. Although polygons were used alongside other returning Final Fantasy characters, Leon could not return in Kingdom Hearts III, which bothered many of the staff members. Kotaku commented that voice actor David Boreanaz made "stilted and odd" and, among other Kingdom Hearts actors, he was overshadowed by Billy Zane's portrayal of Ansem. In contrast, GamesRadar praised Boreanaz.

In the Final Fantasy fighting game, Erholtz said that Squall came across as an easy character to understand, but felt he was not very emotive. This stoic personality led to Erholtz claiming that Squall is fighting an inner darkness as shown by his facial expressions. Erholtz found the game to be fun to do due to all the people he worked with. GameRant believes David Boreanaz was chosen for Squall's role due to voicing a similar brooding anti-hero, Angel, in Buffy the Vampire Slayer, with Doug Erholtz providing a nearly identical performance in following games. Hideo Ishikawa's performance as Squall was highlighted as popular despite him not being able to properly voice him in his original game, as said by fans in Animate Times.

== Appearances ==
=== Final Fantasy VIII ===
At the beginning of Final Fantasy VIII, Squall is known as a "lone wolf" because he never shows his feelings and seems unresponsive to his associates. His superiors, including his teacher Quistis Trepe, consider him challenging to deal with, but respect his talents. Squall is stoical and his taciturn nature used for comic relief. He is forced into a heroic role midway through the game when Cid, headmaster of Balamb Garden, appoints him the leader of the academy. During a late battle against Galbadia Garden, Squall has difficulty leading because of his lingering isolation. Although other characters try to become less reserved and Rinoa Heartilly expends considerable energy pursuing him, it takes time for him to accept the others' friendship and fall in love with Rinoa. Later in the game, Squall becomes more comfortable in a leadership role, especially when he must fight Ultimecia.

Throughout the game, Squall has a rivalry with Seifer Almasy. The two characters scar each other at the beginning, but later are supposed to cooperate; despite this, they still quarrel. Although Seifer later allies with Edea and Ultimecia, requiring Squall to fight him several times, Squall still feels a camaraderie with Seifer.

According to flashbacks during the game, Squall grew up in an orphanage with the other playable characters, except Rinoa. The orphans were cared for by Edea; although Squall remembers little about his past, he becomes an emotionally detached, cynical, and introverted boy whose goal is to go through life without emotional ties or dependence. He gradually warms up to others, and his detachment from his companions is later revealed to be a defensive mechanism to protect himself from the emotional pain he suffered when he and his older stepsister were separated.

After Ultimecia is defeated, the time and space she had absorbed begin to return to normal, pulling Squall's comrades back into their places in the timeline while Squall returns to the orphanage and meets a younger Edea. Squall plants the ideas for Garden and SeeD in her mind, creating an origin paradox; Squall must become the leader of Balamb Garden so he can pass its version of SeeD tradition to Edea, who teaches them to her husband Cid, who co-founds Balamb Garden, which admits Edea's orphans—including Squall.

=== Other appearances ===
Squall appears as a non-playable character in Kingdom Hearts, in which he wears a short leather jacket with red wings on the back and a Griever necklace. Squall takes the name Leon as an alias out of guilt from being unable to protect those he loved from the Heartless when his home world, Radiant Garden, was consumed by darkness. His role in Kingdom Hearts is to help guide the protagonist Sora in his battle against the Heartless. Although Squall's appearance and age differ—he is 25 in Kingdom Hearts— and 17 in Final Fantasy VIII, his personality remains the same. A version of Squall as Leon based on Sora's memory appears in Kingdom Hearts: Chain of Memories, teaching gameplay in a tutorial. In the sequel Kingdom Hearts II, as part of the Hollow Bastion Restoration Committee, alongside Sora, he works with his friends to restore Radiant Garden while facing the army of Heartless used by Organization XIII. Squall also appears as an opponent in Olympus Coliseum tournaments, where he is often paired with other Final Fantasy characters. A virtual replica of Leon appears in Kingdom Hearts coded, in which it meets Sora's virtual replica. Leon's latest appearance is in the Re Mind DLC of Kingdom Hearts III in a minor role as among those helping search for Sora following his disappearance. He is also featured in the Kingdom Hearts manga, where his portrayal is more comical.

Squall is a secret character in Chocobo Racing and Itadaki Street Special, and a sprite version of him occasionally appears on the loading screen of the PlayStation version of Final Fantasy VI. He appears as a playable character in every Dissidia: Final Fantasy title, being one of Cosmos' chosen warriors to fight Chaos' Ultimecia. He returns in downloadable content (DLC) in Dissidia 012, where Squall is defeated by Kain Highwind from Final Fantasy IV, who wants him to stop from fighting Chaos' mannekins army. A costume for Squall based on his Kingdom Hearts appearance is also available. In the latest installment, Dissidia NT, Squall teams up with several other Materia soldiers, mostly Bartz from Final Fantasy V, and faces Jecht from Final Fantasy X.

He is a playable character in Itadaki Street Portable and is the main character representing Final Fantasy VIII in the rhythm games Theatrhythm Final Fantasy, its follow-up Curtain Call, and the arcade-only game TFF: All Star Carnival. Squall also appears as a premium character in Pictlogica Final Fantasy and All The Bravest, both of which are designed for Android and iOS. He is also present in Mobius Final Fantasy, where Squall finds himself in an alternate version of Balamb Garden.

== Reception ==
Squall became a popular character within the Final Fantasy series, ranking highly in multiple lists about Final Fantasy heroes, or characters in general by GameZone. In designing Trevor Belmont, the protagonist from the Castlevania Netflix series, Squall was a major influence in order to give Trevor a "cool" look. However, critical reaction to Squall was mixed. Jack Patrick Rodgers of PopMatters said Squall's cynicism and frustration with those around him made him a strong character but "coldly inhuman". Despite sharing a similar view, GameSpot said the "standoffish because of some repressed Wagnerian broodiness, in which case he was kind of interesting". 1UP.com still found him irritating, comparing him with similar archetypes explored in the franchise, but Edge compared Squall unfavorably with Final Fantasy VII protagonist Cloud Strife, as the former's angst is not given a proper source unlike the latter's. Eurogamer commented that, while Squall remains an unlikable character even after his character arcs that contrast the more social and expressive Final Fantasy leads like Tidus or Noctis Lucis Caelum, he still remained as a realistic take on a soldier. While noting that Squall manages to become a better person, the changes are minimum and the idea of him being able to save the world comes across as "cringe comedy" due to its characterization.

There was also commentary about Squall and Rinoa's relationship. GamesRadar's Brett Elston criticized it, comparing it with the romance from Attack of the Clones, but in a different article, he commented that "Squall and Rinoa are at the heart of it all" even if they do not properly develop. According to Ryan Woo of Complex, the problem with the romance was it because it was mostly one-sided from Rinoa's side until the latter parts of the game, where Squall's development makes it come across as forced. On a more positive view, the website called Squall and Rinoa the best couple created by Square Enix, noting the differences between them and that their relationship is the first in the series to drive the plot of a game. RPGFan found their relationship complicated to like as, despite Rinoa being easygoing with Squall in their first meetings, the fact that she previously dated the antagonistic Seifer made it complicated to take Rinoa properly and instead cannot find himself able to flirt with Rinoa back.

There was also comparisons between Squall and fellow character Laguna. Polygon said Laguna is Squall's opposite which comes across as hilarious since the protagonist thinks poorly of him before ever learning they are related. The fact that Laguna could be Squall's father give meaning for the protagonist to experience his father's days throughout his flashback and learn more about him. In "The Monomyth Of A Seed: A Literary Analysis Of A Jrpg Character’s Hero Journey", Laguna Loire comes across of the protagonist's opposite based on their personalities and his flashbacks help to further help Squall's growth. Novelist Ben Hourigan mentioned in "You Need Love and Friendship For This Mission!" siad Laguna's speech he gives to Squall and the common shut-in player about how to survive to Ultimecia's power.

Literary analysis of Squall's character arc placed him within the hero's journey. He has a contrasting personality with Laguna, his foil, which furthers his development by experiencing Laguna's memories through flashbacks. In his essay, "Final Fantasy and the Purpose of Life", Greg Littmann describes Squall as a Hobbesian protagonist before his evolution into a more rounded individual over the course of the game. Joe Sutton, writing for First Person Scholar, argues that Squall reflexively pushes away others who reach out to him to avoid the pain he might feel if they were to disappear, like his sister did, even as his internal monologue reveals his yearning to connect. He finds that Squall is his own worst enemy, standing in the way of his own development. Game historian Anne McDivitt echoes this interpretation, and identifies Squall's self-reflection in the latter half of the story as he begins to connect with his allies as a catalyst for his subsequent thawing and ability to express his emotions. Ashley Oh of Polygon emphasizes that the major difference between him and Cloud Strife, the protagonist of Final Fantasy VII, is the player's access to his inner thoughts, which made him more relatable.

There was commentary over Squall's Leon persona from Kingdom Hearts. RPGInformer was shocked by his introduction, not only due to the crossover element present in the first game, but also because Squall was voiced for the first time. Erutid said that Leon is far more mature than his younger Squall persona, as he is no longer filled with constant angst compared with his Final Fantasy VIII persona. Comic Book Resources lamented how Squall and the rest of the Final Fantasy characters became cameos in Kingdom Hearts III and the player never gets the chance to fight against them. VentureBeat said that, while Kingdom Hearts offered Squall a more passable backstory, he still lacked development to the point he is often overshadowed by Laguna, not only in his original appearance but also in Dissidia. In retrospect, while Fanbyte found Leon more sexually appealing than Squall, the writer felt that his new backstory made the character unlikable as he broods even more than in his original game.

== See also ==
- Characters of Final Fantasy VIII
