= Laguna Loire =

- Final Fantasy character
- Laguna Loire Dissidia 012 artwork by Tetsuya Nomura
- First game: Final Fantasy VIII (1999)
- Created by: Kazushige Nojima
- Designed by: Tetsuya Nomura
- Voiced by: EN: Armando Valdes-Kennedy; JA: Hiroaki Hirata

In-universe information
- Weapon: Machine gun
- Home: Galbadia

Laguna Loire (Japanese: ラグナ・レウァール, Hepburn: Raguna Rewāru) is a fictional character from Square's role-playing game Final Fantasy VIII. He is a man whose past and relation to the main characters are revealed throughout the game. Most sequences involving Laguna appear in the form of "dreams" experienced by the primary protagonists. Squall Leonhart experiences these dreams from Laguna's point of view, which shows his life as a Galbadian soldier teaming up with his two best friends, Kiros Seagill and Ward Zabac. He also appears in the crossover fighting game Dissidia 012 Final Fantasy as playable character as a soldier chosen by Cosmos alongside other Final Fantasy characters.

Kazushige Nojima created his character based on negative feedback from Final Fantasy VII involving several dark flashbacks. The concept of two main characters, Squall and Laguna, was planned since the beginning of the game's development. Artist Tetsuya Nomura tried to create a contrast between Laguna's and Squall's occupations; thus, Laguna became a soldier with light-hearted charisma, and Squall became a reserved mercenary student. The designers intended Laguna to be more similar to the previous protagonists in the series to complement Squall, who is different from the previous main characters.

Critical response to Laguna's character has been positive, with several writers praising his upbeat and cheerful personality which contrasts the moody Squall. The connection these two characters have has also been the subject of discussion in regards to theories involving how the two appear to be father and son, but the narrative never confirms it, leading to discussion about the lack of potential in developing Squall while seeing his father's days.

== Appearances ==
In Final Fantasy VIII, the player controls Laguna during dream sequences experienced by Squall Leonhart, alongside his companions Kiros Seagill and Ward Zabac. During the first two dream segments, Laguna and his team are shown getting lost and visiting the hotel where Julia Heartilly, Laguna's romantic interest, performs. Julia appears to respond to Laguna's feelings but war makes the two split. Laguna is a twenty-seven-year-old soldier in the Galbadian army who wields a machine gun, using it to perform attacks alongside a swinging rope and a grenade.

After a scouting mission at Centra, Laguna and his friends are separated and Laguna is injured. A young woman named Raine nurses him back to health after he is brought to Winhill. During his time in Winhill, Laguna starts working as a monster hunter while taking after the young girl Ellone. It is eventually revealed Julia got married with another man but Laguna is interested into Raine. He falls in love with and marries her, but is drawn away from his new home when Ellone is kidnapped. Laguna tracks her down in Esthar, where he helps liberate the nation from the despotic rule of Sorceress Adel. The people of Esthar elect Laguna as their president and Ellone is sent back to Winhill without him. After Raine dies, her child, whom Ward and Kiros imply to be Squall in a conversation aboard the Ragnarok ship, and Ellone are sent to an orphanage. Laguna is unable to leave his post to visit her and remains president of Esthar to the present day. Ellone and Laguna are later reunited in space, and Laguna helps Squall which Ellone took part in after preparation for their fight against Ultimecia. Following Ultimecia's defeat, Laguna visits his wife's grave, and reunites with his friends and Ellone again.

Outside Final Fantasy VIII, Laguna appears in the fighting game Dissidia 012 Final Fantasy. In the story, Laguna is involved in the twelfth cycle of the eternal conflict between the gods Cosmos and Chaos, who have both summoned several warriors from different worlds Laguna and other Final Fantasy characters fight creatures known as Manikins. Though they succeed, Cosmos is reduced to a weakened state after using much of her power to diminish the Manikin army when they attempt to kill her and the Warrior of Light, They are successful, but the group disappears from Cosmos' side in the process.

== Creation and concept ==
Laguna was created to be a playable character from Final Fantasy VIII but with different standards from previous supporting characters in the Final Fantasy franchise; initially, the Square staff decided to create a story centered around a hero who would become Squall and the heroine Rinoa according to director Yoshinori Kitase. Kazushige Nojima created Laguna and his scenario in response to negative feedback about their previous installment, Final Fantasy VII, being too sad and having too many flashbacks. Laguna's scenes first appear to the audience as taking place in the same time frame as protagonist Squall Leonhart's story, before revealing that Laguna's stories happened in the past when the pair meet. Kitase later regretted this setup, as it meant that Laguna's scenes could not be set in a different setting than Squall's. In contrast to the characters in Squall's group who have problems understanding his personality, the characters of Kairos and Wald were written to understand Laguna and be friendly throughout all their interactions, even before Laguna could speak. This was based on the "love" theme Square wanted Final Fantasy VIII to explore. Several scenes of Laguna's story were cut by Square. As a result, Nojima expressed desire to make a new Final Fantasy VIII that would explore Laguna's life more.

Laguna's characterization was designed for him to do things that Squall could not, resulting in their opposite personalities with Laguna being friendly and Squall unsociable, though the developers made Squall's personality change over course the game as they feared player reactions if he remained cold. It is implied in the game that Laguna is Squall's father, but this has never been confirmed. After designing serious, moody main characters for Final Fantasy VII and VIII, Nomura wanted friendlier characters like Laguna and Zell Dincht, inspiring the creation of Final Fantasy X lead Tidus.

Laguna appears in the fighting game Dissidia 012 Final Fantasy, where he is voiced by Hiroaki Hirata in Japanese and Armando Valdes-Kennedy in English. He is featured in his youthful Final Fantasy VIII appearance, as well as his older and Galbadian soldier forms. His knight costume is also available as downloadable content. Director Mitsunori Takahashi asked the developers to make the strongest weapon in "EX mode" a weapon that fires a wave motion gun. Hirata was chosen by Nomura to give him a "light" feel as he is older than Squall's even in his regular persona after working with him in The 3rd Birthday. He was also planned to appear in Kingdom Hearts Birth by Sleep as the head of Mirage Arena.

== Reception ==
Laguna has been well-received by gamers and journalists from video game publications. He is ranked seventh in Electronic Gaming Monthly's list of the top ten video game politicians. Ryan Clements and Colin Moriarty of IGN regarded Laguna as one of the best Final Fantasy characters as well as a standout character in Final Fantasy VIII due to his parallels to Squall's group, while in another article, writer Phil Pirello praised how his personality contrasts with that of the more stoic Squall. The same site also noticed that while Squall has more screentime than other characters for being protagonist, Laguna stands out thanks to "lovable goofball" persona as well as his career in politics. GameRant found him as a "charming" character who does not get the recognition he gets by players as across Final Fantasy VIII, he accomplishes several things and obtains peace thanks to becoming Esthar's president and noting how Julia's romance with him was never fully explored. Dengeki Online noted that Julia's romance scene can be improved by making Laguna more tolerant to alcohol which makes the original scene more enjoyable to watch. In another article, the website enjoyed Laguna's flashback for how he contrasts his nervousness over Julia with the cooler Squall and praised his own theme song that plays during his fight scenes.

There was also analysis about Laguna's role in the story and his hidden connection with Squall. In retrospect, Polygon said "Everything about Laguna is wildly endearing" citing one of his scenes where he attempts to flirt with his crush only to suffer from leg cramp and return to his friends ashamed. They came to regard him as Squall's opposite which comes across as hilarious since the protagonist thinks poorly of him before ever learning they are related. The fact that the game never reveals Laguna and Squall's connection confused the writer even though Laguna's adoptive daughter aims to connect these two. The game's ending reveals that Laguna marries another woman whom appears to further connects lineage but the game does not confirm it. Kotaku had a deep appreciation for Laguna's flashback as he wanted a deeper connection that expands the narrative. However, as he realized the Square staff wanted a subtle emotional impact, Laguna's healing days give a sense of nostalgia when is recovering from the war and reunites with Kiros. The writer went on to how it juxtaposes with Squall's side, showing how fates change. The fact that Laguna could be Squall's father give meaning for the protagonist to experience his father's days throughout his flashback and learn more about him. However, he lamented how Laguna's flashbacks could have had a bigger emotional impact had the relationship between him and Squall. It was revealed in the story as the former appreciates his friends far more than Squall and was the original user of the Gunblade weapon for a play which Squall and his rival Seifer wield. Laguna's time as an actor was praised by Dengeki Online for how hilarious it was that he ends up accidentally facing a dragon while wielding a Gunblade in the same fashion as Seifer would be inspired by him. VentureBeat said that Laguna overeshadowed Squall due to coming across as a more likable character despite the tragedy he faces in Final Fantasy VIII such as the death of his wife but keeps his original cheerful persona.

In "The Monomyth Of A Seed: A Literary Analysis Of A Jrpg Character’s Hero Journey", Laguna Loire comes across of the protagonist's opposite based on their personalities and his flashbacks help to further help Squall's growth. Novelist Ben Hourigan mentioned in "You Need Love and Friendship For This Mission!" that while the Final Fantasy series struggles to deal with romantic plots to the audience appeal to concerned teenagers and especially hikikomori, Laguna's speech he gives to Squall's group about how to survive to Ultimecia's power that is directly addressed towards the consumers too which is further referenced by director Yoshinori Kitase. In "25 Years Later People Are Still Overthinking Final Fantasy VIII", Austin Jones from Endless Mode said love was a major theme from the video game as "Eyes on Me" centers on both Laguna and Julia's relationship and Squall and Rinoa's. Additionally, the themes of war and connection resulted in the former separating Laguna from Julia due to the conflict, he ended up meeting Ellone and Raine afterwards and thus form a newfound love in the family he creates.
