= Final Fantasy All the Bravest =

2013 video game

- Official app icon
- Developer: BitGroove
- Publisher: Square Enix
- Director: Tatsuya Kando
- Producers: Ichiro Hazama; Tetsuya Nomura
- Designer: Kyohei Suzuki
- Artist: Naomi Sanada
- Series: Final Fantasy
- Platforms: iOS, Android
- Release: iOS: WW: January 17, 2013; Android: WW: April 13, 2013
- Mode: Single-player

Final Fantasy All the Bravest (Note: Final Fantasy All the Bravest (Japanese: ファイナルファンタジー オール ザ ブレイベスト, Hepburn: Fainaru Fantajī ōru za bureibesuto)) was a video game in the Final Fantasy series developed by BitGroove and published by Square Enix. The game was released for iOS and Android mobile devices.

The title featured gameplay, characters, locations, and art assets from many different Final Fantasy games. Gameplay focused on expanding the number of characters players could possess and unlock all the character jobs by defeating enemies and bosses. Players could also include up to forty characters in their parties.

The game was critically panned, citing a lack of gameplay depth, no character customization, no story, and costly in-app purchases. Positives mentioned were the humorous flavor text and nostalgia for the original games from which the title draws. One of the game's producers later stated that the title is an app, not a game, and understood that this confusion had led to disappointment by players.

The Android version was shut down and removed on November 10, 2022. The iOS version was shut down and removed on July 27, 2023.

== Gameplay ==
=== Combat ===
Players' characters could traverse an overhead map between battles. After a series of battles, players could confront a boss enemy. During combat, the players controlled a party of characters that could be as large as forty individuals. The game featured the Active Time Battle (ATB) system found in other Final Fantasy titles. In this system, battles were turn-based, with turns taken when the gradually increasing ATB gauge reached its capacity. Upon attacking, the bar was emptied and gradually started refilling again. Defeating enemies granted experience points which the player needed to level up. Strengthening characters in this way gave players character slots to expand the player's party. When characters discovered weaponry, it was auto equipped to all characters that could wield it. Once every three hours, the Fever option was available, granting the player the ability to attack without needing the ATB gauge to be refilled.

=== Features ===
Battles featured 30 songs from the Final Fantasy franchise, most of which were battle themes from different titles. With the progress in the game the players could unlock 20 different character jobs such as blue mage, knight, and thief. The players could encounter enemies, including boss characters from previous titles, as well as recurring enemies such as behemoths and cactuars. A player could use Facebook and Twitter within the game to promote the title and earn extra character slots. The game also featured leaderboards for those who have advanced the farthest.

All the Bravest had a huge cast of characters that could be used in combat at the same time. Players could find and collect these characters mostly through in-app purchases.

=== In-app purchases ===
When characters were defeated, they took 3 minutes to revive per character (not simultaneously). Golden hourglass items were purchasable in order to revive all defeated characters instantly. Players could purchase premium characters from previous Final Fantasy games in the in-game shop at random. Characters included Tifa Lockhart, Rinoa Heartilly, Terra Branford, Chocobo, Moogle, a pig from Final Fantasy IV, and others. World tickets were also purchasable to access notable Final Fantasy locations, including Zanarkand, Midgar, and Archylte Steppe.

== Development ==
The first hints of the game's existence came when Square Enix trademarked the name All the Bravest in December 2012. Speculation began that the title was related to Bravely Default: Flying Fairy. Square Enix later posted a teaser page on their Japanese website with silhouettes of Final Fantasy heroes and enemies and a date of "1.17." This teaser led to further speculation that the game would be a re-release of Final Fantasy V or VI, but critics quickly dismissed both theories. Square Enix officially unveiled the title in the following month on January 16, as Final Fantasy: All the Bravest, despite initial plans for the unveiling to occur the next day. All the Bravest was released in the Google Play Store on September 13, 2013.

The original concept for the game came from Tetsuya Nomura who also served as creative producer on the game.

All the Bravest producer Ichiro Hazama recognized that the title "was a fun app, not a game". He also acknowledged that since it was not a full game, many fans were disappointed and that apps must be marketed appropriately based on what they are.

== Reception ==
Reception

Aggregate score
Aggregator	Score
Metacritic	25/100

Review scores
Publication	Score
Gamezebo	1.5/5
IGN	2.5/10
Pocket Gamer	3/10
TouchArcade	1/5
Digital Spy	1/5
Slide to Play	2/4

Final Fantasy: All the Bravest was negatively reviewed by most critics. The game has a weighted score of 25/100, indicating "generally unfavorable reviews" according to the review aggregator Metacritic. Reviewers mainly focused their criticisms on the large number and cost of in-app purchases along with the lack of story, simplistic gameplay, and a lack of respect for players by Square Enix. Despite the poor reception, the game still managed to chart at number 25 on the "Top Paid Apps" chart on the iTunes App Store on January 18, 2013.

IGN stated that despite a small amount of nostalgia, the game had such high prices for its in-game purchases that it was insulting, with the gameplay as repetitive and boring. They ultimately concluded that the game was a black mark on the Final Fantasy franchise. They even took the unprecedented step of issuing a public service announcement not to buy the game. They later cited the game for making money despite bad reviews and high prices. Pocket Gamer also criticized the gameplay and in-app purchase system, stating that there was hardly any game to at all, with the app being like a shady casino. Slide to Play criticized the game for having no gameplay or strategy and that it existed to take people's money. Digital Spy echoed the criticisms of the games in-app purchases and poor gameplay, stating that it felt like a "parody" of what free-to-play games are like, feeling that it exists to "make loyal fans waste their money", adding that it would have had some appeal if not for its "shallow" gameplay.

1Up.com also attacked the lack of real gameplay, as they believed the active time battle system has players attack with no thought to skills, weapons, or even characters. Pocket Tactics, like IGN, also issued a public service announcement not to buy the game. They said that they long defended Square Enix's higher mobile game pricing, but believed that this title was so poor that it showed their disdain for fans. Kotaku also stated that the game is emblematic of Square Enix's lack of respect for fans, and a desire to milk the franchise for money.

GamesRadar+ ranked it as the 44th worst game ever made. The staff accused its developers of cashing in on the Final Fantasy brand. USgamer cited the game as being the most notable misstep Square Enix had done since CEO Yosuke Matsuda took over, but also noted that the project had begun under the previous CEO, Yoichi Wada.

A few critics found elements to compliment. 4Gamer loved the music, monsters, and characters that appeared from past Final Fantasy titles, as well as being able to fight with such a large party. Famitsu also praised the appearance of so many familiar villains from each Final Fantasy title and called the boss fights challenging. Gamezebo noted that the game ran well even with a significant amount of action occurring on-screen. Kotaku identified the menus' flavor text as hilarious, and the only reason to get the game.
