= Edea Kramer =

Final Fantasy VIII character

- Final Fantasy character
- Concept artwork of Edea Kramer for Final Fantasy VIII, as drawn by Tetsuya Nomura
- First game: Final Fantasy VIII (1999)
- Created by: Tetsuya Nomura

Edea Kramer (Japanese: イデア・クレイマー, Hepburn: Idea Kureimā) is a character and major antagonist in Final Fantasy VIII. Protagonist Squall is sent to assassinate her, though it is later discovered that the Sorceress Ultimecia had Edea under mind control. It is also revealed that Edea was the matron for Squall and the other main characters at an orphanage years in the past.

Edea was created by Tetsuya Nomura, who originally intended her to be an antagonist named "Witch" in Final Fantasy VII who served the character Jenova, one of the game's major antagonists. The design went unused in Final Fantasy VII, but because Nomura liked it, it was featured in Final Fantasy VIII. She has received generally positive reception, being noted as an effective villain and praised for her dress.

== Concept and creation ==
Edea is one of three character concepts, along with Fujin and Raijin, to have been created before Final Fantasy VIII. Edea's design, created by Tetsuya Nomura, was originally intended to be featured in Final Fantasy VII and was known as "Witch". She was meant to be a servant of Jenova. Nomura based Edea's design on the style of Yoshitaka Amano, who was the character illustrator of Final Fantasy VI and previous games. This design was not used, but they chose to use this design for her in Final Fantasy VIII due to how much Nomura liked her. A scene depicting Edea murdering someone in front of a cheering crowd was met with speculation that Edea was mind controlling the audience, which was later confirmed in the Final Fantasy VIII Ultimania guide.

== Appearances ==
Edea first appears in the PlayStation role-playing game Final Fantasy VIII. Prior to the game's release, she was marketed extensively in promotional material such as trailers, screenshots, box art and game descriptions or summaries as its main villain. She is initially presented as a power-hungry sorceress who seizes control of the government of Galbadia from President Deling. Edea's motives are unknown, but the mercenary group SeeD dispatches Squall to assassinate her. The mission fails after Edea sends a bolt of ice through Squall's chest. It is later revealed that Edea is married to Headmaster Cid, and was the matron to Squall and the other protagonists who grew up in her orphanage. It is eventually explained that Edea was not acting of her own will, but was possessed by a sorceress from the future named Ultimecia. When Ultimecia's control is broken, Edea takes the side of SeeD in the struggle and joins Squall's party for a short time. However, Edea accidentally gives her powers to Rinoa Heartilly, one of the Party members and fellow protagonist, making her a sorceress. After Ultimecia is defeated, a younger Edea meets Ultimecia and decides to have her powers absorbed, resulting in a time paradox.

Edea appears as a playable character in Final Fantasy Record Keeper, while one of Ultimecia's designs in Dissidia Final Fantasy is based on Edea's.

== Reception ==
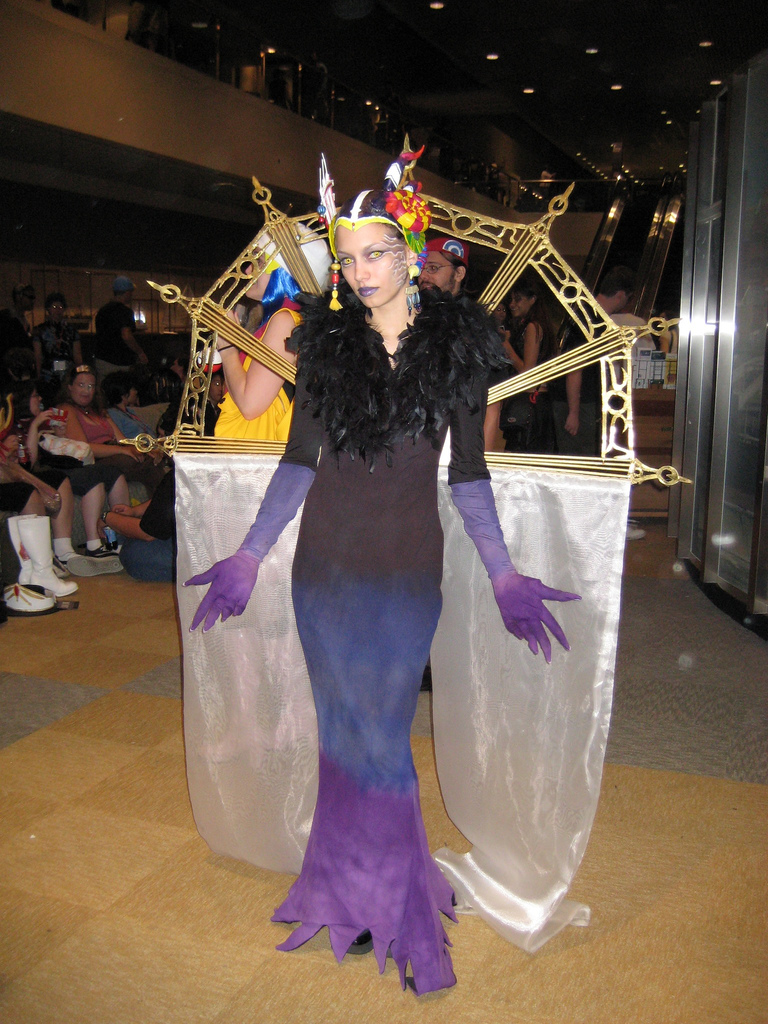
A cosplayer wearing a replica of Edea's costume

Edea has received generally positive reception since Final Fantasy VIII. Meghan Marie of Game Informer and Brittany Vincent of Game Revolution regarded her as one of their favorite video game characters and favorite character designs. Chris Hodges of Screen Rant identified her as one of the most interesting characters in the Final Fantasy series. Her outfit was praised by publications including Complex and IGN. Writers Brittany Vincent and Foster Kamer also ranked her as the 20th coolest video game villain, praising her for how the game shifts her from antagonist to likable ally. Laura Burrows of IGN complimented her attractiveness and discussed how her true personality does not take away from how powerful and vicious she was when she was possessed. Matthew Walden of GameSpot noted the difficulty of finding a villain with a gentler side than her, comparing her non-possessed form to Mother Teresa.

Chad Concelmo of Destructoid included her in their list of "asshole" wizards in video games, due to how difficult an encounter with her turned out. Robert Steinman of RPGFan regarded her as an especially frightening villain, discussing how the twist regarding her true story as one of the strangest in the series. He also drew a comparison between Edea's theme and the theme of Disney villain Maleficent. Paolo Papi of Blasting News included Edea in his list of characters who are both sexy and deadly, discussing her use of her sexuality to "beguile her enemies". Chris Greening of Video Game Music Online discussed how various themes are used throughout the game to demonstrate how Edea's character grows; he cited "The Sacrifice" and "Premonition" as identifying of Edea's dark side, while "The Successor" represents her true nature.
