= Characters of Final Fantasy VIII =

Final Fantasy VIII, a 1999 role-playing video game developed and published by Square, is the eighth mainline entry in the Final Fantasy series. Director Yoshinori Kitase and artist Tetsuya Nomura created the world and cast—Nomura contributed the visual design of both the characters and summoned monsters. Yusuke Naora handled the game world's art design and Kazushige Nojima wrote the scenario. The core staff had all previously worked on Final Fantasy VII, incorporating feedback from that title into their work.

Set in an unnamed fantasy world, the plot focuses on the students of Balamb Garden, a private military academy that trains mercenaries. This mercenary force, SeeD, is employed by multiple nations to fight the expansionist republic of Galbadia. The main protagonist is Squall Leonhart, a SeeD cadet seen as an introspective loner. His main companion and love interest is Rinoa Heartilly, the outspoken leader of a resistance movement against Galbadia. Other companions include Squall's classmates Selphie Tilmitt and Zell Dincht; Quistis Trepe, a Balamb instructor; Irvine Kinneas, a mercenary from another SeeD facility; and Laguna Loire, a soldier who primarily appears in flashbacks. A recurring antagonist for Squall is Seifer Almasy, a rival SeeD cadet. The main antagonists are Edea Kramer, a possessed sorceress controlling Galbadia; and Ultimecia, a powerful sorceress from the future with a vendetta against SeeD.

The world and cast of Final Fantasy VIII were designed with an international audience and bright tone in mind, with the story drawing inspiration from Kitase and Nomura's school days. The two keywords for the narrative were "love" and "academy school". Improvements in technology produced more realistic designs and graphics than Final Fantasy VII, with natural proportions that avoided aesthetic clashes with the full-motion video cutscenes. Nojima wrote the scenario based on Kitase and Nomura's plan for a more personal romantic narrative compared to earlier Final Fantasy entries. Squall and Laguna's narratives initially had an equal presence in the game, but most of Laguna's content was cut. The cast of Final Fantasy VIII has seen praise from reviewers, with many highlighting the more realistic character designs and Squall and Rinoa's romance. Some criticism was given to Laguna's small presence in the game and Squall's antisocial attitude.

== Concept and design ==
Full-motion video depictions of Laguna (left) and Squall, two of the main protagonists

The initial world and story concept for Final Fantasy VIII was created by director Yoshinori Kitase, and character designer Tetsuya Nomura from Final Fantasy series developer and publisher Square. Following the worldwide success of Final Fantasy VII (1997), they decided that the next mainline entry would both have a lighter story and atmosphere, and be aimed at a worldwide market. Kitase and Nomura created the initial concept inspired by their student days. They identified "love" and "academy school" as central themes of the story, and wrote the core plot and main setting. Kitase desired to give the game a foreign atmosphere, with "foreign" being in relation to Japan, ultimately deciding on a European setting. The team wanted to "mix future, real life and fantasy". As part of the goal to create a foreign atmosphere, locations were based on familiar places while maintaining fantasy elements. Inspiration ranged from ancient Egyptian and Greek architecture, to the city of Paris, France, to an idealized futuristic European society. Flags were also given to some factions, with designs based on the group's history and culture.

Kitase wanted a more personal story for Final Fantasy VIII compared to earlier entries. He focused the game on the relationship between Squall and Rinoa, with the remaining ensemble cast acting as props for the two central characters' arc. Kazushige Nojima wrote the scenario, after his previous work on Final Fantasy VII. Reflecting on fan reception to plot elements from VII, Nojima decided to write a story where none of the cast would die and limited his use of flashbacks. He found Squall and Quistis the hardest to write, and Rinoa became his favorite out of the cast. As with Cloud Strife from VII, the protagonist of VIII was quiet and reserved. To differentiate the two, Nojima had Squall's thoughts displayed during cutscenes, giving players insight into his mind denied to other characters. The cast were originally all going to be students in the same class, but this concept was dropped as the team wanted to introduce new party members as the game went on. Nomura came up with the opening scene, with Squall and rival Seifer in a mock duel. The character Laguna originally had a much larger presence in the plot, but many of his scenes were dropped; Kitase remembered the initial plan was for Squall and Laguna to have equal screen time. A "neat" conclusion to their stories drafted by Nomura was also dropped.

Nomura handled designs for both the characters and their weapons, and the Guardian Force summoned monsters. To maintain a foreign atmosphere, the characters of the game were designed to have predominantly European appearances, with Squall as the first character created. Nomura described his designs for VIII as his preferred technique, compared to those in VII which featured characters that "weren't really his style". Based on their experience with the PlayStation's computer graphics technology while developing the previous game, the developers were able to deliver a unified art style and realistic proportions for the characters across the game, whereas characters in VII had multiple in-game models with varying styles across field maps, battle screens, and full-motion video cutscenes. Rather than attempting photorealism, the movie team tried to bring Nomura's stylized designs "into a realistic world". Nojima expected that the higher fidelity animation could cut down on the amount of dialogue but later realized that would not be the case. In contrast to the main cast's grounded designs, Nomura made the antagonist Edea as a "full-on, high-fantasy sorceress". He pushed the Guardian Force designs away from human-like, toward the monstrous or strange. The traditional lightning elemental summoned monster Ramuh, depicted as an old wizard, was replaced by Quetzalcoatl, a mythical bird. This design choice was encouraged by the game's battle designer Hiroyuki Ito. Ito also asked for some of the summoned monsters to be "comical".

The art design, led by graphic designer Yusuke Naora, aimed at having a much lighter aesthetic than Final Fantasy VII; Naora described the game as a "bright, fresh Final Fantasy". Motion capture technology was used for the full-motion video (FMV) sequences to add realism to the characters—Nojima recalled Rinoa's movements during a dance party scene needed adjustments after complaints from women on the game's staff about how she moved in her dress. For FMV, the motion capture data was imported and later refined by hand, whereas the non-FMV animations were created from scratch using motion capture footage as a reference. The game's logo was designed by Yoshitaka Amano. Kitase explained that the logo—showing Squall and Rinoa embracing—was inspired by the team's efforts to express emotion through body language.

== Playable characters ==
From left, Tetsuya Nomura's designs of Selphie, Rinoa and Quistis. Unlike Final Fantasy VII, the game features realistically proportioned characters.

=== Squall Leonhart ===
Squall Leonhart (スコール・レオンハート, Sukōru Reonhāto) is the main protagonist of Final Fantasy VIII. He is a young student at Balamb Garden who is identifiable by the scar on his face that a fellow student, Seifer, inflicted. He rarely speaks and has the reputation of being a lone wolf. As Squall's story unfolds, he becomes fascinated with and falls in love with Rinoa, despite never outwardly expressing his love until the ending. Squall frequently reflects on forlorn memories of standing out in the rain at the orphanage where he grew up, wondering where "Sis" went. Squall wields a gunblade, a sword that uses components of a revolver to send vibrations through the blade when triggered. His Limit Break is Renzokuken, a series of sword strikes. It is later explained that the "Guardian Forces" (GF) which the SeeDs use in battle, cause memory loss, which is why Squall does not remember his past in the orphanage.

=== Rinoa Heartilly ===
Rinoa Heartilly (リノア・ハーティリー, Rinoa Hātirī) is the primary female protagonist of Final Fantasy VIII. She has black hair with brown highlights. She is the estranged 17-year-old daughter of General Fury Caraway, a high-ranking officer in the Galbadian army, and Julia Heartilly, a successful pianist and singer. She is a member of the Forest Owls, a resistance faction seeking to liberate the small nation of Timber from Galbadian occupation. When Squall and his party of SeeD help the resistance movement fight Galbadia, Rinoa decides to stay with them; as a result, she ends up falling in love with Squall. She is outspoken, spirited, emotional, and honest with her feelings, speaking her mind without reservation. Because of her ambition, she can often be stubborn. The contrast between her and Squall's personality positions her as Squall's other foil.

Phil Salvador, library director of the Video Game History Foundation, highlights Rinoa's maturation across the game, coming from an emotionally distant family, to opening herself up to be vulnerable with Squall. Nojima estimated that Rinoa and Squall made it "a third of the way towards true love" during the course of the game, and highlighted the scene aboard the Ragnarok in which Eyes on Me plays. Whereas Final Fantasy VII had hidden affection values that changed Cloud's relationship with the other members of his party, these were removed for VIII because of Rinoa's "special significance" to the story and the "fated meeting" between her and Squall at the SeeD graduation ball. Furthermore, unlike previous games, only Squall and Rinoa may be renamed by the player to preserve the primacy of their relationship.

=== Laguna Loire ===
Laguna Loire (ラグナ・レウァール, Raguna Rewāru) is a man whose past and relation to the main characters are revealed throughout the game. Most sequences involving Laguna appear in the form of "dreams" experienced by the primary protagonists. Squall always experiences these dreams from Laguna's point of view, although he does not think too highly of Laguna. Laguna wields a machine gun and his Limit Break is Desperado, which involves a swinging rope, a grenade, and a barrage of bullets. In the dream segments, he is shown to be a twenty-seven-year-old soldier in the Galbadian army who travels with his companions, Kiros Seagill and Ward Zabac. He is also an aspiring journalist.

=== Seifer Almasy ===
Seifer Almasy (サイファー・アルマシー, Saifā Arumashī) is a classmate and rival of Squall, who is a playable character during the Dollet sequence. He reappears as a boss later in the game. He acts as a foil to Squall in many aspects, having dated Rinoa before she met Squall, Like Squall, Seifer wields a gunblade which he calls "Hyperion". His Limit Break, Fire Cross, allows him to use the attack No Mercy. He later uses the more powerful techniques Demon Slice and Bloodfest against the player. Seifer has a short temper and is often depicted as a bully who desires attention. He is also fiercely independent and is often punished for his recklessness. He is the leader of Balamb Garden's disciplinary committee alongside his friends Fujin and Raijin.

During the introduction sequence, Seifer cuts Squall across the left side of his face with his gunblade, leaving a scar. Squall retaliates with a backhand slash that leaves Seifer with a mirrored scar. At the following field exam in Dollet, Seifer acts independently from his teammates Squall and Zell, abandoning them; consequently, he fails and is not promoted to SeeD. Spurred by dreams of a brighter future, he defects to Sorceress Edea to be her "knight". From his point of view, Squall and the others are "evil" and he recognizes himself as a hero. Following Edea's defeat, the party confronts Seifer one last time as he now serves Ultimecia, and they defeat him. Seifer escapes, kidnapping Rinoa and bringing her to Adel. At the end of the game, Seifer is seen fishing and having fun with Fujin and Raijin.

Nomura had originally intended Seifer to be not only Squall's rival, but also part of the love triangle between him, Squall, and Rinoa. Although this concept was scrapped in the final script, Seifer remains Squall's rival, with his appearance being designed to contrast with his. They have equivalent but mirrored scars on their faces and their jackets are of opposing colors and lengths. Both wield gunblades, but Squall's gunblade is larger and requires two hands, while Seifer's gunblade is lighter and can be wielded with one hand. The book Converging Traditions in the Digital Moving Image: Architectures of Illusion, Images of Truth discusses that while Seifer is seen as a show-off and a troublemaker, Squall identifies with him regardless. IGN listed Seifer as the 91st best video game villain, stating that he makes for a great rival due to the similarities between him and Squall.

A younger version of Seifer appears in Kingdom Hearts II as a member of the Twilight Town Disciplinary Committee alongside Fujin and Raijin. Seifer's counterpart in the virtual Twilight Town is a rival of Roxas, and at one point mentions that he does not wish to cooperate with destiny. He is voiced by Takehito Koyasu in Japanese and Will Friedle in English. He is also featured in Theatrhythm Final Fantasy as a sub-character representing Final Fantasy VIII.

=== Quistis Trepe ===
Quistis Trepe (キスティス・トゥリープ, Kisutisu Turīpu) is an eighteen-year-old instructor at Balamb Garden, where Squall, Zell, and Seifer are students. She wields a chain whip, and her Limit Break, Blue Magic, a common ability found throughout the Final Fantasy games, allows her to imitate monsters' attacks. Early on in the game, Quistis is discharged as an instructor because she "[lacks] leadership qualities". Afterwards, she maintains a more informal relationship with the other characters as a fellow member of SeeD.

As a child, Quistis stayed at an orphanage with most of the main characters. She then lived with foster parents, with whom she never developed any intimacy, before moving to Balamb Garden at age ten. She became a SeeD at fifteen and an instructor two years later. By this time, she had become very popular, with numerous fans who identify themselves as "Trepies". Quistis initially joins Squall to prepare him for his upcoming field exam. She later takes Squall into her confidence and tells him personally about her demotion. Squall rudely tells her to go "talk to a wall" and not burden him with her problems. When Irvine refreshes the main characters' memories about the orphanage, they remember that Squall's asocial behavior began when Ellone, an older sister figure to him, unexpectedly left the orphanage. As a result of these revelations, Quistis recognizes that her feelings for Squall are more sisterly than romantic. Later, she criticizes Squall when he nearly abandons Rinoa.

Quistis also appears in World of Final Fantasy where she is voiced by Miyuki Sawashiro in Japanese and Kristina Pesic in English.

=== Selphie Tilmitt ===
Selphie Tilmitt (セルフィ・ティルミット, Serufi Tirumitto) is a student at Balamb Garden who recently transferred from Trabia Garden. During the Dollet exam, Selphie joins Squall's team after Seifer abandons them. She becomes a full-fledged SeeD alongside Squall and Zell, and the three are assigned to the same team. She participates in many extracurricular activities. Selphie wields nunchaku, and her Limit Break Slot allows the player to cast a random spell numerous times as well as certain magic used in her limit break. She has a notable interest in trains, singing a song about them during the game's many train journeys; Sutton connects trains, on their predefined paths, to the game's themes of fate and destiny.

=== Zell Dincht ===
Zell Dincht (ゼル・ディン, Zeru Din) is a student at Balamb Garden with Squall and Seifer. He is seventeen years old, and is a martial artist who specializes in unarmed combat. Zell wields gloves and attacks with punches and kicks, and his Limit Break, Duel, requires the player to input button combinations to deal damage. Zell is slightly impulsive and overconfident in his skills, but is loyal to his friends. Seifer gives him the nickname "chicken-wuss", which infuriates him. He also has a passion for sweet rolls, changed to hot dogs in the North American localization. In the closing sequence of the game, he almost chokes on them by trying to eat too many at once. Zell lived at the same orphanage as many of the other protagonists, where Seifer first began to bully him. Later on, the Dincht family adopted him in the town of Balamb. His motivation for enrolling at Garden is to live up to the memory of his grandfather, a famous soldier. He is voiced by Noriaki Sugiyama in Japanese in mobile games such as Dissidia Final Fantasy Opera Omnia.

=== Irvine Kinneas ===
Irvine Kinneas (アーヴァイン・キニアス, Āvain Kiniasu) is a student at Galbadia Garden, one of the three mercenary academies in the game. He is one of the Garden's elite sharpshooters, and wields a rifle. His Limit Break is Shot, which deals damage and inflicts status effects depending on the type of ammunition. He acts like a carefree, but misunderstood loner, but this is merely a façade to charm women and hide his lack of confidence. Irvine's initial design was that of a "pretty boy". Kitase asked Nomura to "rough up" his appearance for the final design. For his appearance in Opera Omnia, Irvine was voiced by Daisuke Hirakawa.

After Sorceress Edea becomes the Galbadian ambassador, Balamb and Galbadia Gardens order Squall's team to assassinate her; Irvine is introduced as the sniper for the mission. Moments before the assassination attempt, he explains to Squall that he does not perform well under pressure. Despite this, he fires an accurate shot, but Edea uses magic to stop the bullet. At Trabia Garden, Irvine reveals that he and most of the other party members had lived in the same orphanage, run by Cid and Edea Kramer. However, the others could not remember this because of their use of Guardian Forces (GF), magical beings who cause severe long-term memory loss as a side effect. Because Irvine had not used a GF until he joined the party, he is able to remember his past. During the game, Irvine gradually becomes closer to Selphie, acting on the feelings he had since living with her at the orphanage.

Reflecting on "pathetic" characters from Final Fantasy, the Futabanet Manga Plus editor suggested Irvine as a representative from Final Fantasy VIII. Whereas his initial impression sets him up as a frivolous character, the editor found that his backstory added depth and explained his hesitation during the assassination mission, concluding that his "flippant words and actions suddenly seem rather poignant".

=== Kiros Seagill ===
Kiros Seagill (キロス・シーゲル, Kirosu Shīgeru) is one of Laguna's comrades in the Galbadian Army. He wields a pair of katar daggers, which he uses to slice enemies in his Limit Break, Blood Pain. Following the failed mission in Centra, Kiros is separated from Laguna and Ward. He heals quickly and decides to leave the Galbadian army, but soon finds that life without Laguna lacks excitement. His subsequent search for Laguna brings him to Winhill after nearly a year. When Laguna is forced to leave Winhill to find Ellone, Kiros accompanies him, helping him earn money as an amateur actor to fund the expedition.

=== Ward Zabac ===
Ward Zabac (ウォード・ザバック, Wōdo Zabakku) is Laguna's other comrade. He is an imposing man who wields a large harpoon, which he uses in his Limit Break, Massive Anchor, to crush his opponents from above. During the incident at Centra, he loses his voice in a battle with Esthar soldiers. After being separated from Laguna and Kiros, he becomes a janitor at the D-District Prison. When Laguna becomes president of Esthar, Ward joins Kiros as an advisor, directing affairs with gestures and ellipses. Laguna and Kiros can understand what he is saying by his reactions.

=== Edea Kramer ===
Edea Kramer (イデア・クレイマー, Idea Kureimā) is initially presented as a power-hungry sorceress who seizes control of Galbadia from President Deling. It is later revealed that Edea is the wife of Headmaster Cid, and was known as "Matron" to Squall and the kids that lived at the orphanage. It is also revealed that Edea was not acting of her own will, but was possessed by a sorceress from the future named Ultimecia. After Ultimecia's control over her is broken, Edea joins the SeeDs in the struggle and becomes a member of Squall's party for a short time. However, she accidentally gives her powers to Rinoa, making her a sorceress.

Nomura originally created Edea for use in Final Fantasy VII. Her design is an homage to the art style of Yoshitaka Amano. Kitase knew that Edea's grand reveal at the sorceress' parade in Galbadia was a "key scene" for the game's ability to hook the player and devoted a lot of resources to perfect it.

== Other characters ==
=== Adel ===
Adel (アデル, Aderu) is a sorceress from Esthar who initiated the Sorceress War some years before the start of the game. As the ruler of Esthar, she ordered her soldiers to abduct girls to find a suitable successor for her powers, including Ellone. During the Esthar revolution, Laguna and Dr. Odine devised an artifact to cancel her power and placed her in suspended animation in outer space. In the present, after Edea is released from Ultimecia's control, Ultimecia possesses Rinoa and commands her to free Adel so she can become Ultimecia's new and more powerful vessel. To defeat Ultimecia, Dr. Odine comes up with a plan that involves trapping her within Rinoa's body. Squall's party defeats Adel, and Rinoa inherits her powers, leaving Rinoa as the only sorceress candidate for Ultimecia to possess. Ultimecia possesses her again, and using Ellone's powers, they start "Time Compression", leading to the final battle.

=== Cid Kramer ===
Cid Kramer (シド・クレイマー, Shido Kureimā) is the headmaster of Balamb Garden. After the failed assassination attempt on Edea, the Garden Master, NORG, attempts to seize power from Cid and reconcile with Edea. This sparks an internal conflict, in which the students and personnel side with either Cid or NORG, but Squall and the party quell the conflict and return Cid to power. Afterward, Cid confronts NORG, who started the conflict over financial issues. Sutton connects this conflict to the tension between pedagogy and profitability in the higher education system.

=== Ellone ===
Ellone (エルオーネ, Eruōne) is a mysterious woman who is the missing "Sis" of Squall's past. She has the ability to send a person's consciousness back in time and into the body of another, so they can experience the history of that person. She uses this to send Squall's party into Laguna's past adventures, hoping that they would alter the past, but eventually realizes that her abilities can only view history, not alter it. Ultimecia needs this power to achieve "Time Compression", so she uses Edea and the Galbadian military to find her.

Despite being a key figure to the plot, Ellone's story is mostly told in flashbacks. After Esthar soldiers killed Ellone's parents under sorceress Adel's orders, she lived with Raine in the small village of Winhill, where she also developed a close relationship with her adoptive uncle, Laguna. These peaceful times lasted until she was captured by Esthar. Laguna travelled to Esthar to rescue her and participated in the rebellion to overthrow Adel. After Adel's incarceration in space, Laguna had to remain in Esthar as president. Upon Raine's death, Ellone moved to Cid and Edea's orphanage, where she became an older sister figure to Squall and the other orphans; eventually, she followed Cid to Balamb Garden.

=== Fujin and Raijin ===
Fujin (風神, Fūjin) is a young woman with pale skin and short silver hair who wears an eye patch. Raijin (雷神) is a tall, muscular man with dark hair and features. They follow Seifer as members of the Balamb Garden Disciplinary Committee and join him when he defects to the Galbadian army. Fujin prefers to speak in terse sentences; in the Japanese version, she speaks in Kanji. Raijin has a habit of ending his sentences with "ya know" (もんよ, mon'yo; in the Japanese version). Near the end of the game, she explains to Squall that she and Raijin will temporarily break ties with Seifer because of his recent behavior—they make up in the ending FMV. In battle, Fujin wields a chakram and uses wind-based magic and Raijin uses a bō staff and thunder-based magic.

Fujin and Raijin were to appear in Final Fantasy VII, but the designers excluded them due to their similarity to the Turks. Nomura designed them with old shounen manga in mind. In Kingdom Hearts II, a younger versions of Fujin and Raijin appear as members of Seifer's gang. Fujin is voiced by Rio Natsuki in Japanese and Jillian Bowen in English. Raijin is voiced by Kazuya Nakai in Japanese and Brandon Adams in English.

=== Ultimecia ===
Ultimecia (アルティミシア, Arutimishia) is the main antagonist of Final Fantasy VIII. She is a sorceress from the future capable of reaching her consciousness into the distant past via the "Junction Machine" to possess other sorceresses. Because she operates through the body of a possessed Edea to gain control of Galbadia, Ultimecia's existence is revealed only after she possesses Rinoa to release Sorceress Adel from her orbital prison to take as a new host. Foreseeing her own demise, she seeks to avert her predestined fate through "Time Compression" magic, which would cause time to collapse, extinguishing all life as she becomes an omnipotent goddess.

Following Dr. Odine's plan, Squall and his party take advantage of Time Compression to confront her in the future. Ellone uses her power to sever Ultimecia's possession, temporarily halting the spell, which allows Squall's group to travel to Ultimecia's distant future and defeat her. After the final battle as time returns to normal, the dying Ultimecia transfers her powers to Edea at the orphanage in the past. This action precipitates the sequence of events that form the game's plot, and creates a causal loop.

Sutton draws a parallel between Squall and Ultimecia, who are both paralyzed by their fear of loss, which causes them to isolate themselves figuratively or literally. She is the villainess representing Final Fantasy VIII in Dissidia: Final Fantasy, Dissidia 012 and Dissidia NT, where she is voiced by Atsuko Tanaka in Japanese and Tasia Valenza in English.

== Promotion and reception ==
The characters of Final Fantasy VIII have spawned action figures, jewellery and other goods in their likeness. In 1999, action figure lineups were distributed in Japan by Bandai, Kotobukiya, Banpresto, and Coca-Cola. Bandai also released them to Europe and Australasia the same year. In 2004, action figures of Squall, Rinoa and Selphie were distributed in North America by Diamond Comics.

Reviewers have praised the characters of Final Fantasy VIII. The Gaming Age reviewer was originally concerned with the shift to consistently realistically proportioned characters, but he ultimately found them more appealing. Moreover, the review stated that the character designs and graphical quality allowed the characters to "convey emotions much more dramatically". Game Revolution cited similar praise, agreeing that the change "really makes the graphics impressive". Jeff Lundigran of IGN commented that the "low-polygon characters of Final Fantasy VII are gone, replaced with sometimes surprisingly realistic high-polygon models that only look better the closer they get". GameSpot agreed with the transition, claiming that "involving, personal, and emotional stories are far more believable when they come from, well, people, not short, bizarrely shaped cartoon characters".

On the other hand, Lundigran criticized the manner in which romantic interactions play out, stating that "considering that the love story is so integral to everything that happens—not to mention forming the central image of the box art—it's incomprehensible why no one says 'I love you' to anyone, ever". With Squall, he felt that "FFVIII does break one cardinal rule: when your story is character centered, you'd better center it on a character the audience can care about. Squall, unfortunately, just doesn't fit the bill". However, GameSpot felt that Final Fantasy VIII shifts the story from the "epic" concepts of Final Fantasy VII to the "personal", in that "the characters and their relationships are all extremely believable and complex; moreover, the core romance holds up even under the most pessimistic scrutiny". A later editorial by IGN's Ryan Clements echoed this sentiment, appreciating that Squall and Rinoa's single kiss during the finale serves "one of the player's main rewards for hours of dedication". Although the reviewer at Official U.S. PlayStation Magazine acknowledged possible fears over a romantic storyline, he wrote that "it's only later in the game, once you are really attached to all the distinct and complex characters, that the more emotional themes are gradually introduced".

Critics noted that the remastered version of Final Fantasy VIII, released in 2019, breathed new life into the characters. Polygon observed that the remaster finally made good on the "You're the best looking guy here" meme, which originally lambasted the low resolution graphics of the original game.
