= Rinoa Heartilly =

Co-protagonist of Final Fantasy VIII

- Final Fantasy character
- Rinoa as drawn by Tetsuya Nomura
- First game: Final Fantasy VIII (1999)
- Created by: Kazushige Nojima
- Designed by: Tetsuya Nomura
- Voiced by: EN: Skyler Davenport; JA: Kana Hanazawa

In-universe information
- Weapon: Blaster Edge
- Home: Galbadia

Rinoa Heartilly (Japanese: リノア・ハーティリー, Hepburn: Rinoa Hātirī) is a character and the co-protagonist of Square's (now Square Enix) 1999 role-playing video game Final Fantasy VIII. She is a teenaged member of a resistance faction known as the Forest Owls. After she recruits protagonist Squall Leonhart and his friends, she decides to stay with his group and falls in love with Squall in the process. During their adventure, she is briefly possessed by the evil sorceress Ultimecia and becomes a sorceress herself once the spirit leaves her body. After defeating Ultimecia, Rinoa and Squall become a couple. Rinoa has also made cameo appearances in other Final Fantasy and Square Enix games.

Character artist Tetsuya Nomura designed her to be cute, not beautiful, as he wanted to create a character whose personality would leave an impression on the player. He felt that the more realistic graphical capabilities the original PlayStation could provide, along with advances like full motion video, made female characters too beautiful and was overshadowing their personalities. The design team set out from the beginning to make Rinoa's clothing more realistic than past Final Fantasy games.

Critics and players alike have praised Rinoa for her personality and her beauty. They also praised her romance with Squall, calling both their relationship and Final Fantasy VIII one of the most romantic Final Fantasy titles. Some reviewers, however, called their relationship forced and criticized that they expressed their feelings so late in the story.

== Character design ==
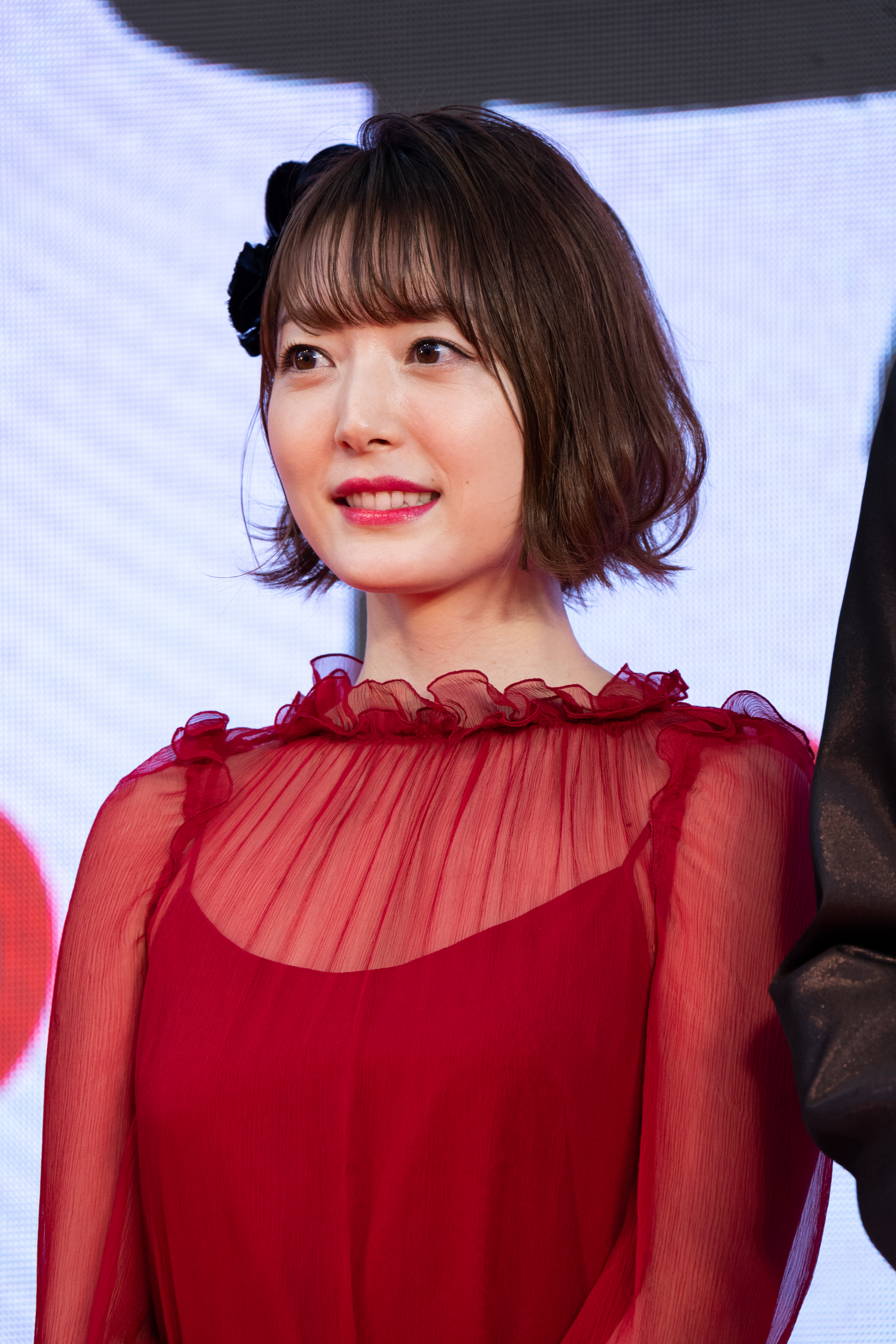
Kana Hanazawa voiced Rinoa in Japanese in Dissidia Final Fantasy NT.

Character artist Tetsuya Nomura found Rinoa the hardest character to design in Final Fantasy VIII. Nomura emphasized that he tried to avoid letting the possibilities presented by the recent advancements in full-motion video technology become the entire focus. He believed that these innovations might tempt developers to make their female characters "too beautiful" and focus more on physical appearance than personality. With this concern in mind, Nomura set out to avoid making Rinoa gorgeous and simply make her "cute" instead. To further emphasize this, he wrote a list of vocabulary traits and physical habits for Rinoa's character that he felt conveyed this idea of "cute, not gorgeous", and sent them to scenario writer Kazushige Nojima along with the character's design.

Designers also based Rinoa's appearance on feedback Nojima got after developing Final Fantasy VII. The women on the development team wanted a different design as they were concerned it was not realistic for a female character to fight in a miniskirt. Yoshinori Kitase, the director of Final Fantasy VIII, designed the game's logo, which shows a male and female character embracing. Kitase wanted to make fans curious about why the couple was embracing. The games' Event Director Hiroki Chiba said that his favorite moment in the Final Fantasy franchise was Squall and Rinoa's embrace with Faye Wong's "Eyes On Me" playing. Chiba listened to the song many times to make the scene's action line up precisely.

For the Kingdom Hearts series, some parts of Squall's design were changed to reference Rinoa's, most notably the wings in his jacket. Nomura stated that the reason Rinoa did not appear in the franchise was because he did not have a clear understanding of Rinoa's personality. Rinoa's first voiced appearance was in Dissidia Final Fantasy NT, with Kana Hanazawa providing her voice in Japanese, and Skyler Davenport performing the English version.

== Appearances ==
=== In Final Fantasy VIII ===
Rinoa Heartilly is the 17-year-old daughter of General Caraway, a high-ranking officer in the Galbadian army, and Julia Heartilly, a famous singer. Over the course of the game, she falls in love with the protagonist, Squall Leonhart. Rinoa is a member of the "Forest Owls", a tiny resistance faction seeking to liberate the small nation of Timber from Galbadian occupation. She is called the "princess" of the group. Rinoa first meets Squall at the SeeD inauguration ball at Balamb Garden. During the dance, she manages to charm the usually antisocial Squall into dancing with her. She then hires Squall and his mercenary friends Zell Dincht and Selphie Tilmitt to fight for the Forest Owls. After failing to assassinate Sorceress Edea for her crimes against Timber, the Forest Owls escape the sorceress and Rinoa decides to stay with the group.

While at the Fishermans Horizon, she shares a moment with Squall during a concert performed by other members of her group. Later on, the evil Sorceress Ultimecia possesses Rinoa after losing control of Edea, which causes Rinoa to fall into a coma-like state. Ultimecia then uses Rinoa to release Sorceress Adel from her orbital prison. Ultimecia then possesses Adel and leaves Rinoa to die. Squall rescues her and the two share another personal moment on the Ragnarok spaceship. Rinoa discovers that she now has Edea's magical powers from her time possessed by Ultimecia, making her a Sorceress as well. Fearful of sorceresses, the Esthar government imprisons her but Squall convinces himself to rescue her. During the game's ending, she reunites with Squall and kisses him on the Balamb Garden balcony for the first time.

=== Other appearances ===
Rinoa appears in Square's and Sony's PlayStation 2 technology demo. Originally a pre-rendered video, the demo recreated the ballroom dance scene in real-time. She appears in several other games, such as the 2012 rhythm video game Theatrhythm Final Fantasy and in the role-playing video game Puzzle & Dragons as part of a Final Fantasy collaboration. Her outfits are available for players to put on their characters in the video game Gunslinger Stratos 2. Rinoa, accompanied by her pet dog Angelo, appears as a playable character in Dissidia Final Fantasy NT. Rinoa and Angelo are also available for recruitment in the free-to-play mobile game Dissidia Opera Omnia. Rinoa is set to appear in Dissidia Duelem: Final Fantasy.

== Reception ==
Rinoa Heartilly has been mostly well received by video game critics and the general public. Japanese fans voted Rinoa as the tenth favorite female Final Fantasy character in an official Square Enix survey in 2013. In 2020 NHK conducted an All-Final Fantasy Grand Poll of Japanese players, with Rinoa ranked as the thirty fifth greatest Final Fantasy character by Japanese respondents. David Smith at IGN UK regarded her as one of the franchises' most memorable characters.

Natalie Flores from Paste Magazine praised her character arc as Rinoa starts as a pacifist heroine and becomes motivated to aid SeeD to defeat Edea and Ultimecia. Mike Gorby, writing for Goomba Stomp, observed that Rinoa subverts gender stereotypes and roles expected of a typical female character and compared her favorably to Squall as he found her more realistic. When Game Revolution's Johnny Liu expressed the wish that the game had voice acting, he specifically mentioned Rinoa. She has been noted due to her beauty by multiple video game publications. IGN's Justin Kaehler and Naomi Cheung remembered the "hot" Rinoa as one of the game's main strengths. GamesRadar described her as "rough around the polygonal edges", but also "feminine enough to make fanboys latch on for years to come".

Some critics focused on the relationship between Rinoa and Squall. IGN noted that their first dance together was both cute and awkward. Aneni Soren of RPGamer wrote a feature article about the "great" relationship between Squall and Rinoa. Jenni Lada of TechnologyTell ranked Final Fantasy VIII as the third most romantic Final Fantasy game. IGN's Ryan Clements called Final Fantasy VIII "one of the best examples of the innocent relationship" based on how subtle it was. IGN UK also ranked the pair as one of the best romances in Final Fantasy and gaming in general. RPGFan found their relationship complicated to like as despite Rinoa's being easygoing with Squall on their first meetings with the protagonist, the fact that she previously dated the antagonistic Seifer made it complicated to take Rinoa properly and instead cannot find himself able to flirt with Rinoa back.

On the other hand, Charlie Barratt of GamesRadar listed her as an example of "lazy character cliches". Ashley Reed of GamesRadar criticized the over-reliance of Rinoa's character on the damsel in distress cliche, alongside other traits that made the character unlikable. Brett Elston, also from GamesRadar, believed her character was too stereotypical. Elston opined that the couple's relationship was a "most forced, uninteresting romance" comparing them to the main cast from the film Star Wars: Episode II – Attack of the Clones. IGN's Jeff Lundigran criticized that they did not express their feelings until late in the game and that players expected more romance from the game's promotional images. Reflecting on the divisive reception received, Flores from Paste Magazine called them the most misunderstood characters in the Final Fantasy series.

A popular fan theory about the game was that the overarching antagonist of Final Fantasy VIII, Ultimecia, is Rinoa from the future. Reed also included the theory of Rinoa being Ultimecia on the list of top nine lingering plotlines in video games. According to Glenn Morrow of RPGamer, most of the arguments in favor of it have potential but also opined that the theory is "in no way" plausible. Kitase debunked this theory when interviewed during the PAX West 2017 event, conceding that while there are similarities, such as both being sorceresses, they are not the same person.

=== Legacy ===
According to Official PlayStation Magazine, "the Final Fantasy VIII characters have certainly been embraced by the Japanese gaming public. At the Tokyo Game Show [1999], there were hundreds of people dressed up as Final Fantasy VIII characters", including Rinoa. Scenario writer Kazushige Nojima said that "it is scary to think about the impact that a game can give to the society". Art director Yusuke Naora also said that "I sometimes really admire them for the time, energy, and money they spent on the costumes". Rinoa, an English post-metal group active from 2007 to 2010, was named after the Final Fantasy character. The 2010 film Scott Pilgrim vs. the World includes a dream sequence referencing a similar scene involving Squall and Rinoa at the end of the game. In 2011, American beauty YouTuber Michelle Phan made a tutorial on how to recreate Rinoa Heartilly's make-up.

== See also ==
- Characters of Final Fantasy VIII
