= Final Fantasy VIII =

1999 video game

- North American box art showing (from left): Squall, Rinoa, and Seifer, with Edea in the background
- Developer: Square (Note: Final Fantasy VIII Remastered developed by Dotemu and Access Games in collaboration with Square Enix.)
- Publishers: PlayStation; WW: Square; NA: Square Electronic Arts; Windows; NA: Square Electronic Arts; EU: Eidos Interactive; JP: Square; WW: Square Enix (Steam); Remastered; WW: Square Enix
- Director: Yoshinori Kitase
- Producer: Shinji Hashimoto
- Designer: Hiroyuki Ito
- Programmer: Ken Narita
- Artists: Yusuke Naora; Tetsuya Nomura
- Writer: Kazushige Nojima
- Composer: Nobuo Uematsu
- Series: Final Fantasy
- Platforms: PlayStation; Windows; Nintendo Switch; PlayStation 4; Xbox One; Android; iOS
- Release: February 11, 1999: PlayStation; JP: February 11, 1999; NA: September 9, 1999; EU: October 27, 1999; AU: October 29, 1999; Windows; NA: January 26, 2000; EU: February 18, 2000; JP: March 23, 2000; Remastered; NS, PS4, Windows, Xbox One; WW: September 3, 2019; Android, iOS; WW: March 24, 2021
- Genre: Role-playing
- Mode: Single-player

Final Fantasy VIII (Note: Japanese: ファイナルファンタジーVIII, Hepburn: Fainaru Fantajī Eito) is a 1999 role-playing video game developed and published by Square for the PlayStation console. It is the eighth main installment in the Final Fantasy series. Set on an unnamed fantasy world with science fiction elements, the game follows a group of young mercenaries, led by Squall Leonhart, as they are drawn into a conflict sparked by a sorceress named Edea Kramer who seized control of a powerful military state. During the quest to defeat the sorceress and the forces manipulating her, Squall struggles with his role as leader and develops a romance with one of his comrades, Rinoa Heartilly.

Development began in 1997, during the English localization of Final Fantasy VII. The game builds on the visual changes brought to the series by VII, including the use of 3D graphics and pre-rendered backgrounds, while also departing from many Final Fantasy traditions. It is the first Final Fantasy to use realistically proportioned characters consistently, feature a vocal piece as its theme music and forgo the use of magic points for spellcasting.

Final Fantasy VIII received acclaim and is considered one of the greatest video games of all time. It was a commercial success, grossing $151 million in its first day of release in Japan, and more than $50 million during its first 13 weeks in North America, making it the fastest-selling Final Fantasy title until Final Fantasy XIII, a multi-platform release. A Windows port followed in 2000, with the addition of the Chocobo World minigame. Final Fantasy VIII was re-released worldwide as a PSOne Classic on the PlayStation Store in 2009, for PlayStation 3 and PlayStation Portable, with support for PlayStation Vita in 2012. It was re-released via Steam in 2013. By August 2019, it had sold more than 9.6 million copies worldwide, making it one of the best-selling Final Fantasy games in the series. A remastered version was released for Nintendo Switch, PlayStation 4, Windows, and Xbox One in September 2019, and Android and iOS in March 2021.

== Gameplay ==
Like the Final Fantasy games before it, Final Fantasy VIII consists of three main modes of play: the world map, the field map, and the battle screen. The world map is a 3D display in which the player may navigate freely across a small-scale rendering of the game world. Characters travel across the world map in a variety of ways, including by foot, car, Chocobo, train, and airship. The field map consists of controllable 3D characters overlaid on one or more 2D pre-rendered backgrounds, which represent environmental locations such as towns or forests. The battle screen is a 3D model of a location such as a street or room, where turn-based fights between playable characters and CPU-controlled enemies take place. The interface is menu-driven, as in previous titles, but with the typical weapon and armor systems removed and new features present, such as the Junction system. Also featured is a collectible card-based minigame called "Triple Triad".

A battle against X-ATM092, an early boss; Zell will summon Shiva when the blue bar that has replaced his ATB is drained.

For Final Fantasy VIII, Hiroyuki Ito designed a battle system based on summoned monsters, called "Guardian Forces", abbreviated in-game as "GF". Assigning ("junctioning") a GF onto a character allows the player to use battle commands beyond Attack with the main weapon, such as Magic, GF (to have a junctioned GF perform an action), and Item. Previous titles provided each character with a limited pool of magic points that were consumed by each spell; in Final Fantasy VIII, spells are acquired ("drawn") either from enemies in battle, Draw Points distributed throughout the environments, or by refining items and cards. Spells are then stocked on characters as quantified inventory (up to 100 per spell and limited to 32 distinct spells per character) and are consumed one by one when used. Characters can also junction (equip) these spells onto their statistics—such as Strength, Vitality, and Luck—for various bonuses, provided the character has junctioned a Guardian Force. The junction system's flexibility affords the player a wide range of customization.

These expanded mechanics for summons were a departure for the series; in previous titles, summons were relegated to a single action during battle. The junction system also acts as a substitute for armor and accessories, which were used in earlier games to modify character statistics. Moreover, where earlier titles required weapons to be equipped and tailored to the character, each major character in Final Fantasy VIII features a unique weapon which can be upgraded, affecting its appearance, power, and Limit Break.

As in Final Fantasy VII, characters in VIII have unique abilities called "Limit Breaks", which range from powerful attacks to support spells. While the characters in Final Fantasy VII receive Limit Breaks after incurring significant damage, in VIII, Limit Breaks become available only at low health (hit points) under normal circumstances. The magic spell Aura increases the probability of Limit Breaks appearing, regardless of a character's remaining hit points, while various status afflictions can prevent Limit Breaks. They are similar to the Desperation Attacks of Final Fantasy VI, albeit more frequent. Final Fantasy VIII also introduced interactive elements to complement Limit Break animations. These interactive sequences, which vary between character, weapon, and Limit Break, range from randomly selected magic spells to precisely timed button inputs. Successfully completing an interactive sequence increases the potency of the Limit Break.

An example of navigation on the field map

Final Fantasy VIII features an experience point (EXP) system quite different from previous titles. The essentials remain unchanged: characters gain EXP after defeating enemies, which are typically encountered randomly throughout the game's environments. Earning a set amount of EXP causes the character to gain a level, which increases their overall statistics. While previous titles feature an EXP curve that increases with each level (e.g. getting to level 2 requires 200 EXP, level 3 requires 400, etc.), characters in Final Fantasy VIII gain a level after accumulating a flat rate of 1000 points. Enemy levels scale based on the party's average level; in most RPGs at the time, enemy levels remain stagnant. Some bosses have level caps to prevent the main quest from becoming too difficult. Higher-level enemies are capable of inflicting and withstanding significantly more damage, may have additional special attacks, and carry additional magic spells, allowing for Junctioning bonuses which themselves far exceed the bonuses imparted by level-gain. The game's unique EXP and level system allows a player to grind to maximum Level 100 before even beginning the plot, though this will result in far more powerful enemies.

In addition to gaining levels, Guardian Forces earn Ability Points (AP) after battles, which are automatically allocated to special abilities that Guardian Forces can learn. When a Guardian Force has learned an ability, that ability becomes available for any character or the character party, as is the case with field abilities. These abilities allow characters to attack more efficiently, refine magic spells from items, receive stat bonuses upon leveling up, access shops remotely, and use additional battle commands.

== Synopsis ==
=== Setting and characters ===
Most of Final Fantasy VIII is set on an unnamed fantasy world. The setting is highly European in design and features a blend of modern and futuristic locales. The planet contains five major landmasses, with Esthar, the largest, covering most of the eastern portion of the map. Galbadia, the second-largest continent, lies to the west, and contains many of the game's locations. The northernmost landmass is Trabia, an Arctic region. Positioned roughly in the middle of the world map lies Balamb, the smallest continent, the island on which the game begins. The remaining landmass is small and mostly desolate, riddled with rough, rocky terrain caused by the impact of a "Lunar Cry", an event where monsters from the moon fall to the planet. The southernmost landmass includes an archipelago of broken sections of land that have drifted apart. Islands and marine structures flesh out the game world, and a handful of off-world locations round out the playable areas.

The six main protagonists of Final Fantasy VIII are: Squall Leonhart, a loner who avoids vulnerability by focusing on his duty; Rinoa Heartilly, an outspoken and passionate young woman who follows her heart; Quistis Trepe, an instructor with a serious, patient attitude; Zell Dincht, an energetic martial artist with a fondness for hot dogs; Selphie Tilmitt, a cheerful girl who loves trains and pilots the airship Ragnarok; and Irvine Kinneas, a charismatic and promiscuous marksman. All but Rinoa and Irvine are members of "SeeD", an elite military force based out of futuristic installations called Gardens. Temporarily playable characters include Laguna Loire, Kiros Seagill, and Ward Zabac, who appear in "flashback" sequences; SeeD cadet-turned-antagonist Seifer Almasy; and sorceress Edea Kramer. The main antagonist is Ultimecia, a sorceress from the future who wishes to compress time.

=== Story ===
Squall and Seifer spar with each other while training outside Balamb Garden, giving each other scars in the process. Meanwhile, the Republic of Galbadia invades the Dollet Dukedom, forcing Dollet to hire SeeD. The school uses the mission as a final exam for its cadets; with the help of his instructor, Quistis, Squall passes the mission's prerequisite and is grouped with Seifer and Zell. Selphie replaces Seifer mid-mission when the latter disobeys orders and abandons his team. SeeD halts the Galbadian advance; Squall, Zell, and Selphie graduate to SeeD status, but Seifer fails the exam due to his disobedience. During the graduation party, Squall meets Rinoa, whose personality is the opposite of his. When assigned with Zell and Selphie to help Rinoa's resistance in Galbadian-occupied Timber, Squall learns that Sorceress Edea is behind Galbadia's recent hostilities. Under orders from Garden, Squall and his comrades—joined by Rinoa, Quistis, and Irvine—attempt to assassinate Edea. During the effort, Squall's party also learns that Seifer has left Garden to become Edea's second-in-command. Edea survives the attempt, stabs Squall in the shoulder with an ice shard, and detains the party.

After Squall's party escapes the prison they were sent to, Edea destroys Trabia Garden in a retaliatory missile strike and prepares to attack Balamb Garden. Selphie delays the launch while Squall's team returns to Balamb Garden and activates its mobile functions to evade the missiles. Garden cannot be controlled, however, and it crashes into the docks at Fishermans' Horizon. While Garden is being repaired, Galbadia invades the town in search of a girl named Ellone, who had been staying at Balamb Garden. Before leaving, Ellone reveals that she has been "sending" Squall and his team into flashbacks set 17 years earlier in a vain effort to alter history. The scenes center on Laguna and his friends as he evolves from Galbadian soldier (where he shared a crush with Rinoa's future mother Julia) to village protector (where he served as caretaker to Ellone alongside a bartender named Raine) to leader of an Estharian resistance against Sorceress Adel. Ellone eventually escapes to Esthar, the world's technological superpower.

Meanwhile, Squall confronts his personal anxieties fueled by ongoing developments, such as Headmaster Cid appointing him as SeeD's new leader and his increasing attraction to Rinoa. Squall and his comrades learn that they, along with Seifer and Ellone but minus Rinoa, were all raised in an orphanage run by Edea; after eventual separation, they later developed amnesia due to their use of Guardian Forces, except Irvine, who did not use them. Cid and Edea had established Garden and SeeD primarily to defeat corrupt sorceresses. After these revelations, the forces of Balamb Garden defeat the Galbadian Army, led by Seifer, aboard Galbadia Garden. Edea is also defeated by SeeD, but the party learns that Edea is merely an unwilling host for Ultimecia, who planned to use Ellone to help achieve time compression. Ultimecia transfers her powers to Rinoa; Edea survives, but Rinoa enters a coma. Squall travels to Esthar to find Ellone, as he believes that she can help save Rinoa.

While Rinoa is being treated on Esthar's space station, Ultimecia uses her to free Adel from an orbital prison. Ultimecia then orders Seifer to activate the Lunatic Pandora facility, inciting a Lunar Cry that sends Adel's containment device to the planet. Having selected Adel as her next host, Ultimecia abandons Rinoa in outer space. Squall rescues her, and they return to the planet on a derelict starship and share a romantic moment; Ellone is captured by Galbadia shortly thereafter. After landing, the party encounters Laguna, now President of Esthar; he reveals Dr. Odine's plan to allow Ultimecia to cast time compression on their terms so that Ellone can send SeeD into Ultimecia's time period. At Lunatic Pandora, Squall's team defeats Seifer, rescues Ellone, and kills Adel; Ultimecia possesses Rinoa and begins casting time compression. Ellone sends Squall's team into Ultimecia's era, where she is defeated in a fierce battle before time compression can be fully achieved.

While the others return to their present, Squall and a dying Ultimecia travel back in time, where Ultimecia passes her powers down to Edea while Squall tells Edea to create the Gardens and SeeD, creating a causal loop. As time uncompresses, Squall gets lost in time, and begins to forget Rinoa's existence. Rinoa finds Squall and the pair return to their original time. Seifer is reunited with his companions, Laguna and Ellone visit Raine's grave, and the SeeD celebrate their victory at Balamb Garden. Squall and Rinoa share a kiss under the moonlight.

== Development ==
Development of Final Fantasy VIII began in 1997, during the English-language translation of Final Fantasy VII, with a staff size of over 100 people. As with much of the production of VII, series creator and veteran Hironobu Sakaguchi served as the executive producer, working primarily on the development of Final Fantasy: The Spirits Within and leaving direction of Final Fantasy VIII to Yoshinori Kitase. Shinji Hashimoto was assigned to be the producer in Sakaguchi's place, while the game and battle system were designed by Kitase and Hiroyuki Ito, respectively. One of the development difficulties encountered was having three real-time characters exploring an environment at the same time. The card game "Triple Triad" was conceived and implemented by programmer Kentarow Yasui. The concept was derived from trading cards which is a popular hobby in some parts of Japan. "Triple Triad" was meant to keep the player's interest during long stretches without cutscenes. Originally, it was simply about collecting cards but Yasui considered this too disconnected from the main game and "begged" for the inclusion of an ability to transform cards into items. The game's total development costs were approximately ¥3 billion or $30 million (equivalent to $58 million in 2025). The staff consisted of about 180 people.

Following the turbulent development of Final Fantasy VII, there was a shake-up of Square's localization process. Final Fantasy VIII was the first title to have extensive communication between the Japanese and North American teams during the process. Lead translator Richard Honeywood wrote a text parser that would automatically convert text from English ASCII to Shift JIS format required by the game engine's compiler, streamlining the translation process dramatically. The game was the first major project of Alexander O. Smith, who would later earn acclaim for his work on Vagrant Story. Smith said that due to a lack of communication with the development team, they were surprised that an IT employee used GameShark to access text files for localizing to Western audiences. The translation was finished by September 1999. The game's European release was delayed due to necessary graphical changes; the cited example was the removal of a Nazi-like uniform.

=== Visual design ===
From the beginning, Kitase knew he wanted a thematic combination of fantasy and realism. To this end, he aimed to include a cast of characters who appeared to be ordinary people. Character designer and battle visual director Tetsuya Nomura and art director Yusuke Naora strove to achieve this impression through the inclusion of realistically proportioned characters, a departure from the super deformed designs used in the previous title. Additionally, Naora attempted to enhance the realism of the world through predominantly bright lighting effects with shadows distributed as appropriate. Other measures taken included implementing rental cars for travel in-game, and the use of motion capture technology to give the game's characters lifelike movements in the game's full motion video sequences. The FMV sequences were created by a team of roughly 35 people, with the total cinematic run-time being estimated at over an hour, approximately 20 minutes longer than the FMV sequences in VII. Motion capture was used to give a general realism to character movement, but the team favored manual animation over relying on motion capture. A major challenge was the technical advances made since the release of VII, and the aim for more realistic characters. A major issue with the cutscenes was having real-time character models moving across environments within an FMV.

In an interview with Famitsu, Naora described that the game was generally designed to be a "bright, fresh Final Fantasy". The main reason was that the team had dealt extensively with dark and "weird" imagery with VII. The designers felt a need to invert the atmosphere of previous games in the series, which had feelings of "light emerging from darkness". This decision was easy for the developers to make, because most of them had worked on Final Fantasy VII and felt that a new direction was acceptable. The world designs were also developed with the knowledge that most of the staff were now used to computer graphics, which was not the case with VII. The developers also noted that with Final Fantasy VIII, they attempted to "mix future, real life and fantasy". As part of a theme desired by Kitase to give the game a foreign atmosphere, various designs were given to its locations using the style of internationally familiar places, while also maintaining a fantasy atmosphere. Inspiration ranged from ancient Egyptian and Greek architecture, to the city of Paris, France, to an idealized futuristic European society. Flags were also given to some factions, their designs based on the group's history and culture.

To maintain a foreign atmosphere, the characters of the game were designed to have predominantly European appearances. The first Final Fantasy VIII character created was Squall. Desiring to add a unique angle to Squall's appearance and emphasize his role as the central character, Nomura gave him a scar across his brow and the bridge of his nose. As there was not yet a detailed history conceived for the character, Nomura left the explanation for Squall's scar to scenario writer Kazushige Nojima. Squall was given a gunblade, a fictional revolver–sword hybrid that functions primarily as a sword, with an added damaging vibration feature activated by use of its gun mechanism. His character design was complemented by a fur lining along the collar of his jacket, incorporated by Nomura as a challenge for the game's full motion video designers. Additionally, some designs Nomura had previously drawn, but had not yet used in a Final Fantasy game, were incorporated into Final Fantasy VIII. These were the designs of Edea, Fujin and Raijin. The latter two had originally been designed for use in Final Fantasy VII, but with the inclusion of the Turks characters in that game, it was felt that Fujin and Raijin were unnecessary. Nomura had designed Edea before the development of VII, based on the style of Yoshitaka Amano. For the Guardian Forces, Nomura felt they should be unique beings, without clothes or other human-like concepts. This was problematic, as he did not want them to "become the actual monsters", so he took great care in their design. Leviathan was the first GF, created as a test and included in a game demo. After it received a positive reaction from players, Nomura decided to create the remaining sequences in a similar fashion.

=== Story development ===
The plot of Final Fantasy VIII was conceived by Kitase, with the story and the characters provided by Nomura and the actual scenario written by Nojima. During the game's pre-production, Nomura suggested the game be given a "school days" feel. Nojima already had a story in mind in which the main characters were the same age; their ideas meshed, taking form as the "Garden" military academies. Nojima planned that the two playable parties featured in the game (Squall's present day group and Laguna's group from the past) would be highly contrasted with one another. This idea was conveyed through the age and experience of Laguna's group, versus the youth and naïveté of Squall's group. Nojima has expressed that the dynamic of players' relationships with the protagonist is important to him. Both Final Fantasy VII and VIII feature reserved, quiet protagonists in the form of Cloud Strife and Squall. With VIII, however, Nojima worked to give players actual insight into what the character was thinking, a direct contrast with his handling of VII, which encouraged the player to speculate.

=== Other media ===
In March 1999, one month after the game's release, Final Fantasy VIII Ultimania was published, a book that features an in-depth guide to Final Fantasy VIII and interviews with the developers. An origami book was released in November 1999. Later on September 22, a CD-ROM titled Final Fantasy VIII Desktop Accessories was released. It contains desktop icons, computer wallpapers, screensavers, and an e-mail application. It additionally features a stand-alone edition of the "Triple Triad" minigame, which allowed players to compete against one another via a local area network.

Also in 1999, the ballroom dance scene of Final Fantasy VIII was featured as a technical demo for the PlayStation 2. In 2000, a PC version was released for Windows. This port featured smoother graphics, enhanced audio, and the inclusion of Chocobo World, a minigame starring Boko, a Chocobo featured in one of the side-quests in Final Fantasy VIII. For most North American and European players, the PC version of the game was the only means of playing Chocobo World, as the game was originally designed to be played via the PocketStation, a handheld console never released outside Japan. Final Fantasy VIII was released on the Sony's Greatest Hits on August 28, 2000. In 2009, the title was added to the PlayStation Store on the PlayStation Network.

Final Fantasy VIII was re-released as part of the Final Fantasy 25th Anniversary Ultimate Box Japanese package in December 2012. An upscaled PC version was released on Steam on December 5, 2013.

=== Music ===
Regular series composer Nobuo Uematsu wrote the soundtrack for Final Fantasy VIII. He tried to base the songs on the emotional content of the scenes in which they would be played, asserting that expressing the emotions he desired was more important than improving skills, because "I think it will be a shame if we won't be able to cry as we play our own game". He could not determine a character's emotions solely based on the plot, instead using images of appearance and attire: "It's important to know when their emotions are at their height, but it usually takes until a month before release for them to finish the ending dialog...!" When IGN Music stated that the music of Final Fantasy VIII was very dark and perhaps influenced by the plot of the game, Uematsu said that "the atmosphere of music varies depending on story line, of course, but it's also my intention to put various types of music into one game". The absence of character themes found in the previous two games was due to Uematsu finding those of Final Fantasy VI and VII ineffective. Uematsu considers it reasonable to have character themes if each character has a "highlight" in the game, but he found Final Fantasy VIII only focused on Squall Leonhart and Rinoa Heartilly as a couple, resulting in the "Eyes on Me" theme.

The original soundtrack was released on four compact discs by DigiCube in Japan on March 10, 1999, and by Square Electronic Arts in North America as Final Fantasy VIII Music Collection in January 2000. It was republished worldwide by Square Enix on May 10, 2004. An album of orchestral arrangements of selected tracks from the game was released under the title Fithos Lusec Wecos Vinosec Final Fantasy VIII on November 19, 1999, by DigiCube, and subsequently published on July 22, 2004, by Square Enix. The pieces were arranged and conducted by Shirō Hamaguchi for a live orchestra. A collection of piano arrangements performed by Shinko Ogata was released under the title Piano Collections: Final Fantasy VIII by DigiCube on January 21, 2000, and subsequently re-published by Square Enix on July 22, 2004.

The score is best known for two songs: "Liberi Fatali", a Latin choral piece that is played during the introduction to the game, and "Eyes On Me", a pop song serving as the game's theme, performed by Hong Kong singer Faye Wong. Near the end of the production of Final Fantasy VII, the developers suggested to use a singer, but abandoned the idea due to a lack of reasoning based on the game's theme and storyline. However, Nobuo Uematsu thought a ballad would closely relate to the theme and characters of Final Fantasy VIII. This resulted in the game's developers sharing "countless" artists, eventually deciding on Wong. Uematsu claims "her voice and mood seem to match my image of the song exactly", and that her ethnicity "fits the international image of Final Fantasy". After negotiations were made, "Eyes on Me" was recorded in Hong Kong with an orchestra. The song was released as a CD single in Japan and sold over 400,000 copies, setting the record for highest-selling video game music disc ever released in that country at the time. "Liberi Fatali" was played during the 2004 Summer Olympics in Athens during the women's synchronized swimming event.

The music of Final Fantasy VIII has appeared in various official Final Fantasy concerts. These include 2002's 20020220 Music from FINAL FANTASY, in which the Tokyo Philharmonic Orchestra played "Liberi Fatali", "Don't Be Afraid", "Love Grows", and "The Man with the Machine Gun", the 2004 Tour de Japon series, which featured "The Oath", the Dear Friends series that began that same year and included "Liberi Fatali" and "Love Grows", and the 2005 More Friends concert, which included "Maybe I'm a Lion". More recent concerts include the Voices – Music from Final Fantasy 2006 concert showcasing "Liberi Fatali", "Fisherman's Horizon", and "Eyes on Me" and the international Distant Worlds concert tour that continues to date, which includes "Liberi Fatali", "Fisherman's Horizon", "Man with the Machine Gun", and "Love Grows". Several of these concerts have produced live albums as well. Music from the game has also been played in non Final Fantasy-specific concerts such as the Play! A Video Game Symphony world tour from 2006 onwards, for which Nobuo Uematsu composed the opening fanfare that accompanies each performance.

=== Final Fantasy VIII Remastered ===
A remastered version of Final Fantasy VIII was released in September 2019, and was announced officially at E3 2019. The remaster, which features high definition graphics and improved character models, was produced in collaboration with Dotemu and Access Games, and was released on Nintendo Switch, PlayStation 4, Windows (via Steam), and Xbox One. It was later ported to Android and iOS, and released on March 24, 2021. The Windows port was later released to GOG.com on January 29, 2026.

== Reception ==
Reception

Aggregate scores
| Aggregator | Score |
|---|---|
| GameRankings | PS: 89% PC: 80% |
| Metacritic | PS: 90/100; NS: 80/100; PC (Remastered): 73/100; PS4: 80/100; XONE: 82/100 |
| OpenCritic | 77% recommend(Remaster) (Note: Based on 65 reviews) |

Review scores
| Publication | Score |
|---|---|
| Computer Gaming World | PC: 2/5 |
| Edge | 9/10 |
| Electronic Gaming Monthly | 95/100 |
| Famitsu | 10/10, 9/10, 9/10, 9/10 |
| GameSpot | PS: 9.5/10; PC: 6.7/10 |
| GameSpy | 90/100 |
| IGN | PS: 9/10; PC: 7.4/10 |
| Maximum PC | 9/10 |
| Next Generation | 4/5 |
| PlayStation: The Official Magazine | 10/10 |

Awards
| Publication | Award |
|---|---|
| Electronic Gaming Monthly | Game of the Year (Readers' Choice) |
| IGN | Best RPG of E3 1999 |
| Computer Gaming World | 20th Best Game of 2000 |
| Academy of Interactive Arts & Sciences (3rd Annual Interactive Achievement Awards) | Console Adventure/Role-Playing Game of the Year, Outstanding Achievement in Animation, Outstanding Achievement in Art Direction |

Final Fantasy VIII received critical acclaim. In general, the game was compared favorably to its predecessors. Though questioning the game's lack of voice overs for its characters, Game Revolution praised its storyline and ending. For their part, Edge labeled Final Fantasy VIII "a far more accomplished game than FFVII". On the other hand, the magazine also felt that the game's length left its story unable to "offer consistently strong dialogue and sub-plots". Additionally, it found some of the story's plot twists "not... suitably manipulated and prepared", leaving it "hard not to greet such... moments with anything but indifference". Overall, Edge considered Final Fantasy VIII to be "yet another outstanding edition of SquareSoft's far-from-final fantasies", summarizing it as "aesthetically astonishing, rarely less than compelling, and near peerless in scope and execution". Electronic Gaming Monthly offered similar comments, stating that the game's character development "is the best of any RPGs" and that "Final Fantasy VIII is the pinnacle of its genre".

Jeff Lundrigan reviewed the PlayStation version of the game for Next Generation, rating it four stars out of five. Francis Hwang of Spin magazine praised the "brilliant-looking" cinematic visuals, stating the cutscenes rival "even the most major of major animated pictures" and that the "combat scenes are filled with the same dramatic poses and dazzling, 70 mm explosions seen in such classics as Akira and Dragon Ball Z".

Reviews of the gameplay have been mixed. IGN felt that it was the weakest aspect of the game, citing its Guardian Force attack sequences as "incredibly cinematic" but tedious, sentiments echoed by Electronic Gaming Monthly. They also regarded the battle system as intensely complicated, yet refreshingly innovative and something that "RPG fanatics love to obsess over". Official U.S. PlayStation Magazine claims that the game's Junction system is a major flaw due to repetitive stocking of spells, while the video game magazine Edge commented that the battle system consists of a "bewildering" number of intricate options and techniques that "most gamers will [...] relish". GameSpot praised the game's battle system, commenting that the "possibilities for customization [with the Junction system] are immense". One reviewer in Famitsu said the card game within the game was highpoint of gameplay while the rest of it was bogged down with the hassle of talking to various townspeople and that Guardian Forces in battle were too strong and threw the game off balance. Another reviewer in the magazine said that Final Fantasy VIII embodies what Japanese fans of role-playing games want: a user-friendly game that will not stress a player out with grinding for experience points or collecting items.

The PC port received mixed reception. Maximum PC praised the full motion video sequences as "phenomenal", adding that while the gameplay took getting used to, they enjoyed the teamwork emphasized by it, and that the game's visual presentation added to its appeal. GameSpy stated that while the game was not a "huge leap forward" from the previous title, its gameplay and visual appeal worked for its benefit, though that on a computer the pre-rendered backgrounds appeared blurry and the controls at time difficult with a keyboard. GameSpot criticized the game for not taking advantage of the capabilities afforded to computers at the time, describing the PlayStation version as both looking and sounding superior, and recommending that the title was "not worth buying period" for the PC. UGO.com also described the port as inferior to its original counterpart, adding that its presentation was in turn detrimental to the reception the game received as a whole. Computer Gaming World praised some of the changes made to the game in light of previous titles and the inclusion of the Triple Triad sub-game, though heavily criticized the port as "lazy" and "disappointing", stating that it only served to emphasize the original game's flaws. Despite their complaints, they named it the twentieth-best game of 2000.

At the 3rd Annual Interactive Achievement Awards, the Academy of Interactive Arts & Sciences awarded Final Fantasy VIII with "Outstanding Achievement in Animation", "Outstanding Achievement in Art Direction", and "Console Adventure/Role-Playing Game of the Year".

=== Sales ===
It was a best-seller in Japan. It had more than 2 million pre-orders prior to release. The game set a single-day sales record, selling 2.21 million copies and grossing ¥17.2 billion or $151 million (equivalent to $292 million in 2025) in its first day of release. It sold approximately 2.57 million units in Japan within the first four days of release. Within two days of its North American release on September 7, 1999, Final Fantasy VIII became the top-selling video game in the United States, a position it held for more than three weeks. It sold more than 1 million units and grossed more than $50 million (equivalent to $97 million in North America during the 13 weeks that followed, making it the fastest-selling Final Fantasy title). It was also a best-seller in the UK. In Europe, it grossed €26,549,294 or $28,296,238 (equivalent to $54,688,000 in 2025) in 1999, adding up to more than $228 million (equivalent to $441 million) grossed in Japan, North America and Europe during 1999.

By the end of 1999, 6.08 million units were sold worldwide, including 3.61 million in Japan, 1.35 million in North America, and 1.12 million in Europe and other territories (including Australia, mainland East Asia, and Africa). Its sales had increased to 7 million units by early 2001. By March 2003, the game had shipped 8.15 million copies worldwide, including 3.7 in Japan and 4.45 abroad. By 2009, it had sold over 8.6 million copies on the PlayStation. According to Steam Spy, an estimated 703,000 digital copies of the PC version were sold on Steam by April 2018. By August 2019, worldwide sales were over 9.6 million units across all platforms.

=== Retrospective ===
The opening cut scene in Final Fantasy VIII was ranked second on Game Informer's list of "Top 10 Video Game Openings", and first by IGN. GameSpy listed it as the 15th-best cinematic moment in video games. IGN named the game's ending the third best of any game for the PlayStation, while UGO.com named it one of the series' best and most memorable moments. Final Fantasy VIII was voted by readers of Japanese magazine Famitsu as the 22nd-best game of all time in 2006, and named one of the 20 essential Japanese role-playing games by Gamasutra, stating "[t]here's a lot that Final Fantasy VIII does wrong, but there's even more that it does right".

UGO.com said that while no other game in the series had stirred the controversy that Final Fantasy VIII had and that while it was flawed, the title was a "daring, groundbreaking game [...] decidedly the most original console-style RPG ever created". In 2000, IGN named it the seventh-best title for the PlayStation, placing higher on the list than Final Fantasy VII; the publication felt that VIII improved on the strengths of its predecessor. Kat Bailey, writing for 1Up.com, noted Final Fantasy VIII as the first game in the Final Fantasy series which features a love story as the game's overarching theme, calling it a daring choice and a symbol of the video game medium's continued evolution as a form of storytelling, with numerous subsequent video games adopting romantic subplots to varying degrees of success. In 2024, Phil Salvador, library director of the Video Game History Foundation, created a new website ff8isthe.best dedicated to essays about the game. He attributed a shift in public consensus about the game from "universally beloved" to "divisive" to the outsized influence of early YouTube creators circa 2007 who specialized in Angry Video Game Nerd-style rant videos, which set the tone of discussion in that era. He also noted that the influence of those early creators has waned, giving way to a more positive reappraisal.

== See also ==
- List of Square Enix video game franchises
