= Kingdom Hearts: Melody of Memory =

2020 video game

- North American box art
- Developers: Square Enix Creative Business Unit I; indieszero
- Publisher: Square Enix
- Directors: Tetsuya Nomura; Masanobu Suzui
- Producer: Ichiro Hazama
- Programmers: Ryu Nakamura; Shuishi Kitamura
- Artist: Tetsuya Nomura
- Writers: Tetsuya Nomura; Tsukasa Okayasu; Erina Onishi
- Composers: Yoko Shimomura; Takeharu Ishimoto; Tsuyoshi Sekito
- Series: Kingdom Hearts
- Engine: Unity
- Platforms: Nintendo Switch; PlayStation 4; Xbox One; Windows
- Release: Switch, PS4, Xbox One: JP: November 11, 2020; WW: November 13, 2020; Windows: WW: March 30, 2021
- Genre: Rhythm
- Modes: Single-player, multiplayer

Kingdom Hearts: Melody of Memory (Note: Kingdom Hearts: Melody of Memory (キングダム ハーツ メロディ オブ メモリー, Kingudamu Hātsu: Merodi obu Memorī)) is a 2020 rhythm game developed by Square Enix and indieszero and published by Square Enix for the Nintendo Switch, PlayStation 4, Xbox One, and Windows. It is the fourteenth installment in the Kingdom Hearts series, retelling the events of the series so far, while also being set after Kingdom Hearts III's Re Mind downloadable content scenario.

Series creator Tetsuya Nomura revealed in January 2020 that two development teams were working on new Kingdom Hearts content outside of the Kingdom Hearts III Re Mind downloadable content and the mobile game Kingdom Hearts Dark Road, with Melody of Memory formally announced that June. Kingdom Hearts: Melody of Memory was released worldwide in November.

== Gameplay ==
Two-player rhythm gameplay in Kingdom Hearts: Melody of Memory

Kingdom Hearts: Melody of Memory is a rhythm game featuring both single and multiplayer gameplay. Players press buttons with the right timing to get an Excellent, Good, or Miss, depending on the timing. A Miss affects the player's health, which causes the game to end when it has run out. Players work to level up the characters' health and attack power, with each character having two types of ranged and melee attack abilities.

The main single player mode is World Tour, which is the "story campaign" of the game. Each song is categorized into a stage, either Field Battle (world exploration tracks), where players complete songs rhythmically in each world, and face appropriate enemies in each stage from the original games in which the song is based on, Memory Dive (tracks associated with a specific character or uses vocals), where players replay stages from past games in music video-like sequences with gameplay similar to Field Battles, and Boss Battle (tracks associated with bosses), where players face bosses from the series. After songs have been completed, they can be replayed individually. Melody of Memory features three-person parties, of which there are four different groupings. Once new parties have been unlocked, they can be used at any time. Disney characters serve as guest members in their specific themed worlds, bringing different sounds and symbols to the gameplay. King Mickey serves as a fourth party member, assisting the player with healing and additional rhythm points when activating the "Summoning Star" item. Traversal between each of the worlds is done through the Gummi Ship, a system used in previous mainline Kingdom Hearts games. Melody of Memory features the series' Beginner, Standard, and Proud difficulties, while each stage has three play options available: Basic; One Button, which removes button complexity and allows party members to auto-attack; and Performer, which adds additional enemies and button sequences. Each stage features various objectives to complete, that award material to unlock new songs and items. Clearing stages unlocks a music and cinematic scene player.

Multiplayer modes include Double Play co-op mode, where players compete locally together playing as Sora and Riku to get the highest collective score, COM versus, where players compete against the computer to get a high rank three times out of five, and versus mode, where players compete against each other online or with local multiplayer (Nintendo Switch only) for the best score in a best 2 out of 3. This mode features "tricks", which are used to disrupt the other player, once at the beginning of the track and again towards the end. There are 10 different types of tricks, with co-director Masanobu Suzui saying they make completing the songs "more tricky and complicated" given how players can combine the tricks. Winning in versus mode increases a player's ranking and awards two collectible cards, while the runner-up receives one. The Nintendo Switch version of the game features a free-for-all battle royal mode, where up to eight players can compete against each other in local multiplayer. The gameplay of Melody of Memory has been compared to Theatrhythm Final Fantasy.

== Story ==
=== Setting ===
Melody of Memory retells the story of the Dark Seeker Saga, starting with the first Kingdom Hearts and moving in order through Kingdom Hearts III. This is done through Kairi, who reflects upon the events of the series, narrating for the player. Series creator and director Tetsuya Nomura said "once we go through the story of recollection and beyond that, we start to see a timeline that will connect to the future". The game also continues Kairi's story immediately after the end of the Kingdom Hearts III Re Mind downloadable content scenario. Nomura stated the character's childhood would be explored, which had been mostly a mystery up until this point, but cautioned the new story was "not meant to advance things significantly". He added that "there are hints sprinkled throughout" regarding the Master of Masters, with Nomura acknowledging the character and the title sharing an acronym (MoM). Suzui felt the game was a "summary" of the Kingdom Hearts series "in a nice, easy to digest format" while still featuring "hints about what's coming next" in the franchise. Melody of Memory features 47 worlds from the series (31 Disney and 16 original worlds) and 33 locations known as "dark holes" where the boss battle songs take place. As many Disney worlds were chosen as possible, with Suzui calling it "robust" while not feeling "like a rush through a collection of the entire series".

=== Characters ===
Twenty-one characters from the series are playable in the game, with four main party groupings: "Team Classic" with Sora, Donald Duck, and Goofy; "Team Days" with Roxas, Xion, and Axel; "Team 3D" with Riku and two Dream Eaters; and "Team BBS" with Aqua, Ventus, and Terra. King Mickey serves as a fourth, assist party member. Playable Disney characters include Hercules, Aladdin, Mulan, Beast, Ariel, Simba, Peter Pan, and Stitch, who appear in worlds based on their respective franchises and fill a random spot in the player's party outside of the leader.

=== Plot ===
Following Sora's disappearance, Kairi enters a deep sleep under Ansem the Wise's observation, creating a dream world from her memories of Sora to search for clues to his whereabouts within her own heart. Towards the end of her dream, Kairi confronts an illusion of Xehanort, who overpowers her before Sora remotely takes control of her body and defeats him. Before Kairi reawakens, Xehanort reminds her of when he sent her away from Radiant Garden in her childhood, during which he mentioned a world on the "other side". Kairi reports her findings to Ansem, who reasons the "other side" to mean a fictional world beyond their reality. Kairi is then approached by the Fairy Godmother, who sends her and Riku to the Final World to meet the heart of a girl from the other reality. (Note: The girl first appears in an optional cutscene in Kingdom Hearts III, credited as the "Nameless Star".) Riku explains his dream of a modern metropolis to the girl, who recognizes it as a city in her world called Quadratum, allowing Riku to open a portal to the other reality and search for Sora. Kairi remains behind to train under Aqua, while Yen Sid sends Donald and Goofy to inform the rest of their comrades of their progress, and Mickey to Scala ad Caelum to investigate ancient Keyblade Masters and their connection to the other reality.

== Development ==
Around the release of the rhythm game Theatrhythm Dragon Quest in 2015, Suzui, who created the Theatrhythm games, had pitched the idea of a Theatrhythm Kingdom Hearts game, which was declined by Nomura. Disney would revisit the idea sometime later, at which point, Nomura felt a rhythm game "lined up" with the direction of the franchise. In January 2020, when discussing the future of the Kingdom Hearts series, Nomura revealed that two new development teams were working on Kingdom Hearts content outside of the Kingdom Hearts III Re Mind downloadable content and the mobile game Kingdom Hearts Dark Road. He added that one of these games would be "coming out earlier than you would think", with the Re Mind title screen "lay[ing] some of the groundwork for it". In June 2020, Square Enix announced Kingdom Hearts: Melody of Memory would be coming in 2020 to the Nintendo Switch, PlayStation 4, and Xbox One. indieszero serves as a developer, with members of the Kingdom Hearts III team supervising the animation and visual effects and assisting with parts of the game, as Melody of Memory was being developed alongside Kingdom Hearts III. The team used the Unity game engine to develop the game, having been familiar with it from developing the Theatrhythm Final Fantasy: All-Star Carnival arcade game. Visual Works created the CGI sequences for the Memory Dive tracks. The game mechanics were adjusted to mesh what would be expected from a Kingdom Hearts game (smooth attack motions) to that of a rhythm game (exact attacks after a button press) with Suzui saying, "We took a style that is utilized a lot in Japanese animation where you deliberately adjust the keyframes so the animation gets the 'exact hit.'" Nomura revealed the COVID-19 pandemic "had a bit of an impact on the schedule" delaying the game extremely from Square Enix's original plan. He added the main area of impact was with the voice actor recording. The game does not feature a secret ending, and downloadable content was not planned for it.

=== Design ===
The visual styles of Theatrhythm Final Fantasy and Theatrhythm Dragon Quest served as a basis for the game, but Suzui was keen on using 3D graphics and the existing Kingdom Hearts character models in the game. Because the game was built from "the ground up", the Theatrhythm naming was not used. Melody of Memory was also inspired by a jukebox website created for the series' 15th anniversary which saw Sora traveling over sheet music while music from the series could be played.

=== Music ===
Over 140 songs from the series and its Disney worlds are featured. Regarding the songs chosen for the game, Suzui looked to the set lists used for the Kingdom Hearts world tour concerts as a starting point and added the creators "wanted to make sure that there was no particular melody that we left out". The majority of the tracks focus on those created for the series, with less of a focus on the Disney songs, though they are featured in the Disney worlds. No new tracks were created for the game, instead relying on all preexisting tracks, though the title and end credit tracks are new arrangements from series composer Yoko Shimomura.

== Release ==
Kingdom Hearts: Melody of Memory was released on the Nintendo Switch, PlayStation 4, and Xbox One in Japan on November 11, 2020, and worldwide on November 13. In Japan, a bundle was available that included the game along with the Kingdom Hearts III soundtrack. To commemorate the October 2021 release of Sora as a downloadable fighter in Nintendo's fighting game Super Smash Bros. Ultimate, players with the DLC can unlock the track "Dearly Beloved -Swing Version-" for use in Ultimate if they have save data for the Nintendo Switch version of Melody of Memory.

== Reception ==
Reception

Aggregate scores
| Aggregator | Score |
|---|---|
| Metacritic | NS: 79/100; PS4: 74/100; XONE: 75/100 |
| OpenCritic | 64% recommend (Note: Based on 78 reviews.) |

Review scores
| Publication | Score |
|---|---|
| Destructoid | 7/10 |
| Famitsu | 35/40 |
| Game Informer | 8.0/10 |
| IGN | 7.0/10 |
| Jeuxvideo.com | 15/20 |
| Nintendo Life | 8/10 |
| Nintendo World Report | 8.5/10 |
| PlayStation Official Magazine – UK | 7/10 |

=== Reviews ===
IGN praised the game as "delightful", citing the game's reliance on nostalgia and the enjoyment fans of the franchise would experience. Game Informer was impressed by the broad scope of the game's music collection as well as the game's boss battles, though their small number was called a "big letdown". Famitsu highlighted that despite being a rhythm game, the variety of attack methods make the game feel like the player is actually engaged in combat. Destructoid called the story elements "superfluous" and were confused by the availability of powerful items to finish levels and the game's discouragement of their use. Polygon called the game's storytelling cutscenes "lackluster", "unintelligible", and "ridiculous".

=== Sales ===
The Nintendo Switch version sold 22,813 physical copies within its first week on sale in Japan, making it the ninth bestselling retail game of the week in the country. The PlayStation 4 version was the thirteenth bestselling retail game in Japan throughout the same week, with 18,120 copies being sold.
