= Kingdom Hearts HD 2.8 Final Chapter Prologue =

2017 video game compilation

- Developer: Square Enix Business Division 3
- Publisher: Square Enix
- Directors: Tetsuya Nomura; Tai Yasue
- Producer: Rie Nishi
- Designers: Tomokazu Shibata; Tai Yasue; Michio Matsuura
- Programmers: Tamotsu Goto; Masashi Nakamichi; Kengo Naka
- Artist: Tetsuya Nomura
- Writer: Masaru Oka
- Composers: Yoko Shimomura; Takeharu Ishimoto; Tsuyoshi Sekito
- Series: Kingdom Hearts
- Engine: Unreal Engine 4 (KH0.2 / KHχBC)
- Platforms: PlayStation 4; Xbox One; Windows; Nintendo Switch (Note: Playable until June 9, 2027); Nintendo Switch 2; PlayStation 5; Xbox Series X/S
- Release: PlayStation 4: JP: January 12, 2017; WW: January 24, 2017; Xbox One: WW: February 18, 2020; Windows: WW: March 30, 2021; Nintendo Switch: WW: February 10, 2022; Nintendo Switch 2, PlayStation 5, Xbox Series X/S: WW: October 8, 2026
- Genre: Action-role playing
- Mode: Single-player

Kingdom Hearts HD 2.8 Final Chapter Prologue (Note: Kingudamu Hātsu HD 2.8 Fainaru Chaputā Purorōgu (Japanese: キングダム ハーツ HD 2.8 ファイナル チャプター プロローグ; stylized Kingdom Hearts HD II.8 Final Chapter Prologue)) is a compilation of games from the Kingdom Hearts series, developed and published by Square Enix. A successor to the Kingdom Hearts HD 2.5 Remix game compilation, the new title was announced in September 2015 and released in January 2017 on PlayStation 4, on February 18, 2020, on Xbox One, and on March 30, 2021, and June 13, 2024, on Windows via Epic Games Store and Steam respectively. A cloud version of the collection was released for the Nintendo Switch on February 10, 2022. Ports for Nintendo Switch 2, PlayStation 5, and Xbox Series X/S were released on October 8, 2026.

Kingdom Hearts HD 2.8 Final Chapter Prologue includes a high-definition remaster of Kingdom Hearts 3D: Dream Drop Distance (2012). This title covers how protagonists Sora and Riku prepared for the return of the antagonist Xehanort. The collection also includes two new pieces of content set in the Kingdom Hearts series. The first, Kingdom Hearts χ Back Cover, (Note: Kingudamu Hātsu Kī Bakku Kabā (キングダム ハーツ キー バックカバー)) is a "cinematic" film based on the game Kingdom Hearts χ. It includes events not shown in that game regarding the earliest parts of the series' story. The other title, Kingdom Hearts 0.2: Birth by Sleep – A Fragmentary Passage, (Note: Kingudamu Hātsu 0.2 Bāsu bai Surīpu: Furagumentarī Passēji (キングダム ハーツ 0.2 バース バイ スリープ -フラグメンタリー パッセージ-)) is an original game that takes place after the events of Dream Drop Distance. This title revealed what happened to the protagonist Aqua during her time lost in the Realm of Darkness. To avoid having too much backstory in Kingdom Hearts III, series director Tetsuya Nomura chose to place this story he long desired to tell in this collection. Back Cover and A Fragmentary Passage are the tenth and eleventh installments in the Kingdom Hearts series.

Critics had varied opinions on the value of the game compilation. Most praised the quality of the graphics, utilizing technology then being developed for the upcoming Kingdom Hearts III. Some also praised the role of the collection in filling story gaps in the storyline of the Kingdom Hearts series. Some, however, criticized the release of the compilation as a teaser for Kingdom Hearts III.

== Games ==
=== Kingdom Hearts Dream Drop Distance HD ===
Kingdom Hearts: Dream Drop Distance takes place after the events of the game Kingdom Hearts Re:coded. Dream Drop Distance focuses on the protagonists' Sora and Riku's "Mark of Mastery" exam. In order to pass, the pair must enter their dreams to free worlds trapped in the realm of sleep and hone their powers in preparation for the return of Xehanort.

The game is a high definition remaster of Dream Drop Distance, which Nomura also stated is essentially a full remake of the game since the original utilized the two screens of the Nintendo 3DS. Developers also reworked minigames from the 3DS version that utilized that console's dual touch screens into a card-based system. At the same time, the developers made enemies "less offensive than they originally were", a complaint from players in the original. Additionally, they switched the 3DS's touchscreen-based controls to a more traditional game-controller scheme.

Due to the workload of adapting the game, developers made no extras or new content for this release. The few additions made included PlayStation 4 trophies, the ability to play the game at 60 frames per second, and a much-requested addition by the Osaka development team to include the minor enemy, the Catanuki.

=== Kingdom Hearts 0.2: Birth by Sleep -A fragmentary passage- ===
Aqua in the Hall of Magic Mirrors in Kingdom Hearts 0.2: Birth by Sleep – A Fragmentary Passage. The game made use of Unreal Engine 4 also used in Kingdom Hearts III.

Kingdom Hearts 0.2: Birth by Sleep -A fragmentary passage- is a new game told from the perspective of the protagonist Aqua. The story begins after Kingdom Hearts: Dream Drop Distance when King Mickey reveals that he has secrets to confess relating to Aqua and her time in the Realm of Darkness. The story then picks up after the secret ending of Kingdom Hearts: Birth by Sleep Final Mix and details Aqua's journey through the Realm of Darkness during the following ten years, briefly intersecting with the events of the original Kingdom Hearts. Fragments of worlds previously found in Birth by Sleep make up the game's environments.

Nomura felt he needed to create this story, but did not want to slow down Kingdom Hearts III with many backstories. Consequently, he separated it from that game and included it in this collection. Developers designed the game to take several hours to play, or approximately one game world in a regular Kingdom Hearts title. A Fragmentary Passage ties into the story of Kingdom Hearts III. In terms of gameplay, the "Doubleflight" ability returns, which allows Aqua to leap higher and do a mid-air double jump, while also gaining a burst of speed mid-jump.

=== Kingdom Hearts χ Back Cover ===
Kingdom Hearts χ Back Cover is a one-hour long cinematic film set during the events of the video game Kingdom Hearts χ. The film tells the game's story from the perspective of the Foretellers, the apprentices of the Master of Masters who are driven apart by suspicion when evidence reveals one of them is a traitor.

== Development ==
In January 2011, with the release of the game Kingdom Hearts Birth by Sleep Final Mix, a secret ending was discovered in the game, titled Birth by Sleep: Volume 2. This game content, which appeared to bridge the story gap between Birth by Sleep and the original Kingdom Hearts, was believed to be a potential future game in the series. In October 2014, when asked about the content seen in the secret ending, Kingdom Hearts series director Tetsuya Nomura stated, "It shows the existence of Aqua's story in the Realm of Darkness. It means that she didn't just wander about in the Darkness for ten years, but that she passed through many experiences. However, it is a 'Fragmentary Passage,' as the name suggests – that story was severed and wasn't told. I hope I can tell it when given the opportunity". The credits of the game compilation Kingdom Hearts HD 2.5 Remix include clips of the game Kingdom Hearts 3D: Dream Drop Distance and a secret ending related to Dream Drop Distance, hinting at a possible new Kingdom Hearts game compilation.

In September 2015, Square Enix announced Kingdom Hearts HD 2.8 Final Chapter Prologue, for release in 2016 on the PlayStation 4. Nomura stated that Square Enix developed the collection alongside the game Kingdom Hearts III. They made the collection so players could experience some of the new gameplay elements being developed for Kingdom Hearts III "sooner than later". Nomura explained the game compilations title, stating that Kingdom Hearts: Dream Drop Distance is considered number 2.6 in the series since it follows the events in HD 2.5 Remix. The Kingdom Hearts χ games are considered 0 in Nomuras counting system because the series protagonist Sora does not appear. Birth by Sleep is 0.1, thus resulting in a 0.2 value for A Fragmentary Passage. When added together, the numbers total 2.8.

In December 2015, a trailer for the game debuted at the gaming festival Jump Festa, and critics praised the game collection for its aesthetic quality. Square Enix developers utilized the Unreal Engine 4 used to make Kingdom Hearts III in all three titles. This allowed for quick changes during game development, especially lighting effects. A trailer released in September 2016 at the Tokyo Game Show featured a new remix of Kingdom Hearts theme song "Simple and Clean", produced specifically for 2.8, and the games' opening cinematics. In July 2017, Nomura spoke on bringing the collection to the Xbox One console, saying he did not believe there was much demand for it outside of North America. However, he also said it could be a possibility after Square Enix completed development of Kingdom Hearts III. At the X019 gamer event in November 2019, Shinji Hashimoto and Ichiro Hazama announced that the 2.8 collection, along with 1.5 and 2.5, would be released on the Xbox One in 2020.

The game was released on Windows exclusively via Epic Games Store on March 30, 2021, and later on Steam on June 13, 2024, following the expiration of the exclusivity. On October 5, 2021, it was announced that a cloud version of the game was in development for Nintendo Switch and was released on February 10, 2022. The cloud release was discontinued on June 10 in favor of a native port for the Nintendo Switch 2, which will be released on October 8, 2026. Owners of the cloud versions on the Nintendo Switch version are entitled to a discount on preorders and transfer their save data to the Nintendo Switch 2 version. The cloud versions, if purchased, will still be able to be accessible until June 9, 2027.

== Release ==
Initially scheduled for release in December 2016, Kingdom Hearts HD 2.8 Final Chapter Prologue was released in Japan on January 12, 2017, and worldwide on January 24, 2017. Preorders for the game included an official Disney Collector's Pin for the game. Square Enix later bundled Kingdom Hearts HD 2.8 Final Chapter Prologue with the Kingdom Hearts HD 1.5 + 2.5 Remix collections as part of a new compilation, Kingdom Hearts: The Story So Far, released in North America on October 30, 2018, for the PlayStation 4. The Xbox One and Xbox Game Pass versions released on February 18, 2020.

== Reception ==
Reception

Aggregate scores
Aggregator	Score
Metacritic	PS4: 76/100; XONE: 82/100
OpenCritic	47% recommend (Note: Based on 75 reviews.)

Review scores
Publication	Score
Destructoid	7.5/10
Famitsu	34/40
Game Informer	8.5/10
GameSpot	7/10
GamesRadar+	4/5
IGN	7.5/10

Kingdom Hearts HD 2.8 Final Chapter Prologue received "generally favorable" reviews, according to video game review aggregator platform Metacritic. It sold 137,797 copies within its first week of release in Japan.

Reviewers universally praised the graphical re-creation of Kingdom Hearts: Dream Drop Distance on the PlayStation 4 from its origins on the Nintendo 3DS. USgamer referred to the game's conversion from one optimized for a two-screen portable game system to a console one as "lovely". Game Informer was also impressed by the visual improvements made from the game's rerelease. However, GameSpot criticized the lack of any other changes to the title, such as populating the game's "overly roomy, empty worlds". USgamer also praised the title A Fragmentary Passage for being a sort of tech demo of Kingdom Hearts III.

Critics had mixed feelings about the value of the collection and its stories. Jonathan Dornbush of IGN said that the collection is "a great glimpse at what's to come, but the return to the past is an at-times unsatisfying appetizer". GamesRadar's Anthony John Agnello concurred, said that "Kingdom Hearts HD 2.8: Final Chapter Prologue is essential for the faithful, flummoxing for newcomers, and a promising start to the series' life on PS4". Chris Carter from Destructoid called the title "a solid game that definitely has an audience. Might lack replay value, could be too short and there are some hard-to-ignore faults, but the experience is fun".

Some reviewers such as Push Square did find things to praise about the collection such as getting the chance to explore resolutions to the many cliffhangers left by the previous Kingdom Hearts games. RPGamer stated that if anyone wished to understand what happened plot-wise between Kingdom Hearts II and Kingdom Hearts III, the game collection was essential. The Independent praised the gameplay of A Fragmentary Passage as "gorgeous" and called Aqua's journey through the Hall of Magic Mirrors "devilishly fun". GameSpot also praised the compilation's inclusion of new stories, and Game Informer called the titles "good preparation for what's ahead".

Other reviewers, however, found the stories confusing and felt the game was merely a teaser for Kingdom Hearts III. Ars Technica called the three titles unconnected in any way to each other. They also cited their confusion with the story of Dream Drop Distance, calling it "hard-to-follow gibberish with flashbacks, flashbacks within flashbacks". USgamer called the compilation "one big teaser" for Kingdom Hearts III. Game Informer also believed that the title was yet another game meant to kill time before the release of the at the time unreleased Kingdom Hearts III.
