= Kingdom Hearts HD 1.5 Remix =

Remastered HD video game collection

- European cover art
- Developer: Square Enix 1st Production Department
- Publisher: Square Enix
- Directors: Tetsuya Nomura; Tai Yasue
- Producer: Rie Nishi
- Designer: Tetsuya Nomura
- Writers: Jun Akiyama; Daisuke Watanabe; Kazushige Nojima
- Composer: Yoko Shimomura
- Series: Kingdom Hearts
- Platforms: PlayStation 3; PlayStation 4; Xbox One; Windows; Nintendo Switch; Nintendo Switch 2; PlayStation 5; Xbox Series X/S
- Release: PlayStation 3: JP: March 14, 2013; NA: September 10, 2013; AU: September 12, 2013; EU: September 13, 2013; HD 1.5 + 2.5 Remix; PlayStation 4: JP: March 9, 2017; NA: March 28, 2017; PAL: March 31, 2017; Xbox One: WW: February 18, 2020; Windows: WW: March 30, 2021; Nintendo Switch: WW: February 10, 2022 *^{Cloud}; WW: October 8, 2026 *^{Native}; Switch 2, PS5, Xbox Series X/S: WW: October 8, 2026
- Genre: Action role-playing
- Mode: Single-player

Kingdom Hearts HD 1.5 Remix (Note: Kingudamu Hātsu HD 1.5 Rimikkusu (Japanese: キングダム ハーツ HD 1.5 リミックス; stylized Kingdom Hearts HD I.5 ReMIX)) is an HD remastered collection of the Kingdom Hearts series, developed and published by Square Enix originally for the PlayStation 3. It was revealed in September 2012 and released in Japan in March 2013, and North America, Australia, and Europe in September 2013.

Kingdom Hearts HD 1.5 Remix includes both Kingdom Hearts Final Mix (2002) and Re:Chain of Memories (2007) in high-definition and with Trophy support. Additionally, the collection features a cinematic remake of Kingdom Hearts 358/2 Days, including high-definition cutscenes from the original game plus new scenes; the 358/2 Days cinematic also has Trophy support. Ideas for a remastered collection of Kingdom Hearts games were first revealed in August 2011, with the collection formally announced in September 2012. Kingdom Hearts Final Mix, in addition to being created from the ground up due to lost assets from the original game, had the most adjustments made to its gameplay, including adding Reaction Commands first introduced in Kingdom Hearts II and allowing the camera to be moved with the right thumb stick.

The collection was met to generally positive reviews. A second collection, Kingdom Hearts HD 2.5 Remix, was released in 2014 while a third collection, Kingdom Hearts HD 2.8 Final Chapter Prologue, was released in 2017. 1.5 Remix was released in a single, combined collection with 2.5 Remix on the PlayStation 4 on March 28, 2017, on the Xbox One on February 18, 2020, and on Windows via Epic Games Store and Steam on March 30, 2021, and June 13, 2024, respectively. A cloud version of the collection was released for the Nintendo Switch on February 10, 2022 with an native port replacing it on October 8, 2026. The collection also released on Nintendo Switch 2, PlayStation 5, and Xbox Series X/S on the same date.

== Games ==
=== Kingdom Hearts Final Mix ===
Kingdom Hearts follows the adventures of Sora, a cheerful teenager who fights against the forces of darkness. He is joined by Donald Duck, Goofy and other Disney characters who help him on his quest.

In the original and Final Mix versions of Kingdom Hearts, the command menu had four commands: Attack, Magic, Items, and a fourth context-sensitive slot that varied depending on several factor's, including the player's location and which character they were targeting. The command menu was updated to include "Attack", "Magic", "Items", and "Summons" in the fourth slot, which was originally located as a sub-category beneath the "Magic" menu. The original fourth command is replaced by the introduction of Reaction Commands from Kingdom Hearts II, triggered by pressing the Triangle Button. The camera works more similarly to that of Kingdom Hearts II, utilizing the right thumb stick to move the camera and allowing the player to click the R3 button to reset the camera behind Sora, as opposed to the original game which made use of the shoulder triggers L2 and R2 to position the camera. Overall, the gameplay of Kingdom Hearts Final Mix was modified so it would play more similarly to Kingdom Hearts II and Re:Chain of Memories, to create a more consistent play style throughout the series.

It was released in North America, Australia, and Europe for the first time as part of the collection.

=== Kingdom Hearts Re:Chain of Memories ===
Kingdom Hearts Re:Chain of Memories is a direct sequel to Kingdom Hearts, and its ending is set about a year before Kingdom Hearts II. The game follows Sora and friends, exploring a mysterious castle. At the same time, Riku explores the castle's basement levels and fights the darkness.

This version of Chain of Memories was released in Europe and Australia for the first time as part of the collection, as it was previously released in North America in December 2008.

=== Kingdom Hearts 358/2 Days ===
358/2 Days takes place near the end of Kingdom Hearts, continuing parallel to Kingdom Hearts: Chain of Memories. The story is told from the perspective of Roxas, following his daily life within Organization XIII and his relationship with fellow Organization member Axel; it also introduces a fourteenth member, Xion, who becomes friends with the former two.

358/2 Days does not appear in playable form, and instead features the Nintendo DS game adapted into 2 hours and 50 minutes worth of cinematic retelling, and features Trophy support on PlayStation 3.

== Development ==
In August 2011, Tetsuya Nomura expressed desire to release a high definition re-release of the game, though he had yet to confirm such plans. The idea for a high definition re-release preceded plans for Final Fantasy X re-release, and was a focus for two Square Enix programmers for over a year.

In September 2012, Square Enix announced Kingdom Hearts HD 1.5 Remix for release in Japan on the PlayStation 3. The collection, developed in-house by Square Enix's 1st Production Department, would include both Kingdom Hearts Final Mix and Kingdom Hearts Re:Chain of Memories in high definition and Trophy support, as well as non-playable HD event scenes from Kingdom Hearts 358/2 Days as a way for players to understand the story. The development team experimented with using some character models from Kingdom Hearts 3D: Dream Drop Distance for HD 1.5 Remix. The cutscenes from Kingdom Hearts Final Mix were remastered with Japanese voice overs for both Chain of Memories and 358/2 Days so that 70% of main story scenes would have full voice acting. 358/2 Days was originally planned to receive a full remake for the compilation similar to Re:Chain of Memories, but due to the lengthy development time it would require, it was instead presented as an extended HD cinematic retelling the game's events. Every cutscene from Kingdom Hearts 358/2 Days, whether it was originally a pre-rendered scene or used in-game graphics, was re-animated for the cinematic.

In January 2013, Jesse McCartney, the voice of Roxas, posted a picture on Instagram of himself in a recording booth, with Roxas seen on a screen in the background, along with the caption, "For all you 'Kingdom Hearts' Fans. Recording the next chapter! #KingdomHearts #Roxas #Gamers." McCartney later deleted the image. In February, Square Enix confirmed the game would release in North America and Europe, later revealing September 2013 releases for North America, Australia, and Europe.

It was revealed in March 2013 in a Famitsu interview, that 66 tracks spanning across all three games (with a majority of them concentrated in Kingdom Hearts Final Mix) were re-recorded with live instrumentation, as opposed to the original games' use of the PlayStation 2's built-in tone generator for their background music. In June 2013, Nomura stated that the original game assets for Kingdom Hearts had been lost some time ago. He explained, "[The game data] was lost, so we had to research, and we had to dig out from the actual game what was available and recreate everything for HD. We had to recreate all the graphics and it was actually not that easy." In July 2017, Nomura spoke on bringing the collection to Xbox One, saying he did not believe there was much demand for it outside of North America, but felt it could be a possibility after Square Enix completed development on Kingdom Hearts III. At the X019 event in November 2019, Shinji Hashimoto and Ichiro Hazama announced that the collection, along with 2.5 and 2.8, would be released on the Xbox One in 2020. The game released on Windows exclusively via Epic Games Store on March 30, 2021, and later on Steam on June 13, 2024, following the expiration of the exclusivity.

In October 2021, it was announced that a cloud version of the game was in development for Nintendo Switch as part of Kingdom Hearts HD 1.5 + 2.5 Remix. The cloud release was delisted from sale on June 10 in favor of native ports for the Switch and Nintendo Switch 2, which were released on October 8, 2026. Owners of the cloud versions are entitled to a discount on preorders, and will still be able to access the titles until June 9, 2027. The ports were also released on PlayStation 5 and Xbox Series X/S on the same day.

== Release ==
Kingdom Hearts HD 1.5 Remix was released in Japan on March 14, 2013, in North America on September 10, 2013, in Australia on September 12, 2013, and in Europe on September 13, 2013. Preorders for the game in North America, Australia, and Europe included a book of the game's concept artwork and a dynamic PlayStation 3 theme. Square Enix also released the collection in a bundle in Japan with Kingdom Hearts HD 2.5 Remix titled, Kingdom Hearts Collector's Pack: HD 1.5 + 2.5 Remix. The Collector's pack featured both collections, a code to get an Anniversary Set for Kingdom Hearts χ [chi], music, and a booklet with art from the series.

In October 2016, Square Enix announced a single-disc compilation release of Kingdom Hearts HD 1.5 Remix and Kingdom Hearts HD 2.5 Remix for the PlayStation 4. It was released on March 9, 2017, in Japan, and was released on March 28, 2017, in North America, and March 31, 2017, in Europe and Australia. A set of free downloadable content for the PS4 version released in June 2017 added a Theater mode for Kingdom Hearts Final Mix and an additional cutscene for 358/2 Days; these were included by default in later ports of the collection. An additional bundle, Kingdom Hearts: The Story So Far, includes the Kingdom Hearts HD 1.5 + 2.5 Remix PlayStation 4 collection and Kingdom Hearts HD 2.8 Final Chapter Prologue and was released in North America on October 30, 2018 for the PlayStation 4.

== Reception ==
Reception

Aggregate scores
Aggregator	Score
Metacritic	77/100
OpenCritic	88% recommend (Note: Based on 50 reviews.)

Review scores
Publication	Score
Electronic Gaming Monthly	8/10
Game Informer	8.25/10
GameSpot	7/10
GameTrailers	7.5/10
IGN	8.5/10

Kingdom Hearts HD 1.5 Remix received generally positive critical reception. Aggregating review website Metacritic gave the game a 77 out of 100 based on 49 reviews. Kotaku gave the release a generally positive rating, praising the redone visuals, tweaked gameplay, and expanded content, but also noting the game's age is still palpable. Game Informer praised the collection, stating "The core of this collection is the excellent original game, and that's where your attention should be. The other two lowly offerings are inessential bonus features." Joystiq gave a positive, unscored review, saying the collection "captures that early era of the franchise at its purest simplicity. It's a trip down memory lane for long-term fans, while the visual overhaul and back-to-beginnings story should make it a welcoming entry point for newcomers." GameSpot stated, "Kingdom Hearts HD 1.5 Remix presents a couple of the earliest games in the beloved series in their best light and makes a revealing cinematic experience out of a third one. The three experiences complement one another with unique elements and welcome context that is a treat for longtime fans and newcomers alike."

GameTrailers felt that, "While Kingdom Hearts HD 1.5 ReMIX certainly lives up to the HD part of its name, the collection is not without its shortcomings. The original game's inclusion with all the new revisions and the addition of Final Mix content is a worthy investment on its own, and the inclusion of Chain of Memories is a nice gesture. The card-based battle system might be off-putting, but it's a unique experiment that deviates from the norm of the series. However, despite the overhauled visuals and new voice work, it's hard to excuse the reduction of 358/2 Days to a lengthy film rather than an actual game." IGN felt that the collection was "an excellent way to replay the series' first two games in crisp, high-definition splendor" but was disappointed that the box art did not properly distinguish 358/2 Days as a non-playable game. Electronic Gaming Monthly stated the collection "brings a PS2 classic to the modern age with a noticeably impressive visual update, improved camera controls, and, for added fun, secondary and tertiary Kingdom Hearts content all contained on one disc."

== Additional collections ==
=== HD 2.5 Remix ===
In October 2012, Tetsuya Nomura suggested that an HD-version of Kingdom Hearts II was likely to be created for another collection, saying that "it'd be unusual if there wasn't" another one. In the credits of HD 1.5 Remix, clips of Kingdom Hearts II Final Mix, Kingdom Hearts Birth by Sleep Final Mix, and Kingdom Hearts Re:coded were shown, hinting at a second collection. On October 14, 2013, Square Enix announced Kingdom Hearts HD 2.5 Remix, with the collection including the previously mentioned games in high definition. However, Re:coded appears as HD cinematics, similar to 358/2 Days in HD 1.5 Remix. The collection was released exclusively for the PlayStation 3 in Japan on October 2, 2014, in North America on December 2, 2014, in Australia on December 4, 2014, and in Europe on December 5, 2014.

=== HD 2.8 Final Chapter Prologue ===
In the credits of HD 2.5 Remix, clips of Kingdom Hearts 3D: Dream Drop Distance were shown as well as the inclusion of a secret ending related to the game, hinting at a possible additional collection. In September 2015, Square Enix announced Kingdom Hearts HD 2.8 Final Chapter Prologue. The collection features an HD remaster of Dream Drop Distance as well as Kingdom Hearts χ Back Cover, a cinematic retelling of Kingdom Hearts χ that reveals new parts of the series' history in HD cinematics, and Kingdom Hearts 0.2: Birth by Sleep – A Fragmentary Passage, a new game taking place after the events of Birth by Sleep, told from the perspective of Aqua. It was released on January 12, 2017 in Japan and January 24, 2017 for other countries.
