= Kairi (Kingdom Hearts) =

- Kingdom Hearts character
- Kairi as she appears in the first Kingdom Hearts
- First game: Kingdom Hearts (2002)
- Created by: Tetsuya Nomura
- Designed by: Tetsuya Nomura
- Voiced by: Japanese; Risa Uchida; Sumire Morohoshi (young); English; Hayden Panettiere (2002–2006, 2010); Alyson Stoner (2008–present); Ariel Winter (young)

In-universe information
- Affiliation: Princesses of Heart
- Weapon: Keyblade
- Origin: Radiant Garden
- Home: Destiny Islands

Kairi (Japanese: カイリ) is a fictional character from Square Enix's Kingdom Hearts series. She debuted in the original Kingdom Hearts (2002) as the best friend of protagonists Sora and Riku. Kairi is a former resident of Radiant Garden and one of the seven Princesses of Heart; as part of experiments conducted by the antagonist Xehanort, she was sent away from her homeworld in hopes of finding the one who possesses the Keyblade. After Sora defeats one of Xehanort's incarnations, Kairi is separated from him and left behind on the reforming Destiny Islands. In later games, Riku gives her the Keyblade Destiny's Embrace (デスティニープレイス, Desutinī Pureisu; lit. "Destiny Place"), which she uses to become a fighter. She becomes playable in the downloadable content (DLC) of Kingdom Hearts III (2019).

Kairi is an original character created by Tetsuya Nomura for the Kingdom Hearts series. She is voiced by Risa Uchida in the Japanese version. In English, she is voiced by the late Hayden Panettiere in Kingdom Hearts (2002), Kingdom Hearts II (2005), and Blank Points (the secret ending of Kingdom Hearts Birth by Sleep (2010)), and by Alyson Stoner in Kingdom Hearts Re:Chain of Memories (2007), Kingdom Hearts 358/2 Days (2009), and Kingdom Hearts III (2019). As a child in Kingdom Hearts Birth by Sleep, she is voiced by Sumire Morohoshi in Japanese and Ariel Winter in English.

== Appearances ==
Kairi is introduced in the 2002 Japanese role-playing game Kingdom Hearts as a 14-year-old teenager preparing to embark on a journey with her friends Sora and Riku. However, Sora and Riku's homeworld, Destiny Islands, is destroyed by the Heartless, causing Kairi's body to fall into a coma while her heart takes refuge within Sora. Upon learning of Kairi's identity as a Princess of Heart and the location of her heart, Sora sacrifices his own heart to return hers to her body, becoming a Heartless in the process. While Sora disappears, Kairi escapes from a revived Ansem along with Donald Duck and Goofy and, after finding Sora's Heartless, restores him to human form. Following Ansem's defeat, the worlds that had been destroyed by the Heartless are restored, including Destiny Islands. Kairi later remains behind on the restored Destiny Islands to await Sora's return from his journey, having realized his intimate feelings for her.

In Kingdom Hearts II, the antagonist Axel approaches Kairi and asks her to come with him, but she flees with help from Pluto and Riku. Saïx soon kidnaps her to motivate Sora into acting according to Organization XIII's wishes. She escapes with help from Naminé, her Nobody who was created from Sora's transformation into a Heartless, and Riku, who gives her the Keyblade Destiny's Embrace so she can fight alongside Sora. Naminé merges with Kairi to become whole once again, just as Roxas merges with Sora upon their reunion. After Sora and Riku defeat the Organization's leader, Xemnas, Kairi reunites with them on Destiny Islands. The prequel Kingdom Hearts Birth by Sleep shows her childhood in Radiant Garden, where Aqua and King Mickey protect her from creatures of darkness known as the Unversed. She reappears in the secret ending, set after the events of Kingdom Hearts II. In Dream Drop Distance (2012), Yen Sid summons her to train as a Keyblade wielder to combat Xehanort's reconfigured Organization XIII.

In Kingdom Hearts III, Kairi trains with a reformed Axel in a secret place created by Merlin's magic. After completing her training, she reunites with her friends and shares a paopu fruit with Sora, a legendary fruit that binds the destinies of those who eat it together. Afterwards, she participates in the final battle against Xehanort and Organization XIII, but Xehanort destroys her body to motivate Sora into helping recreate the χ-blade. In the final scene of the game, Kairi is shown to have been revived by Sora by using the power of waking, before he fades away as a consequence of misusing that power. In the "Limitcut" episode of the Re Mind DLC, Kairi is revealed to have entered hibernation in Ansem the Wise's lab to uncover clues on Sora's whereabouts within her heart. In Melody of Memory (2020), Kairi awakens and deduces with Riku that Sora is in a location outside of their own reality called Quadratum. As Riku departs to save Sora, Kairi stays behind to train with Aqua.

Outside of the Kingdom Hearts series, Kairi appears in Super Smash Bros. Ultimate (2018) as a collectible spirit. She was also added into Fortnite as an outfit, as part of the game's Kingdom Hearts collaboration.

== Creation ==
Many events involving Kairi in the first game occur off-screen, such as the reason she was sent to Destiny Islands. She is a victim of the villain Xehanort, known as Ansem in that installment. A magical event took her from her hometown of Hollow Bastion, formerly known as Radiant Garden, to Destiny Islands, where she met Sora and Riku. This was part of a plan to find the Keyblade, which makes their friendship both fated and coincidental. During the story, the player sees Kairi as a toddler playing with her grandmother, who tells a fairy tale which foreshadows future events of the game. Kairi's name can be interpreted as "sea", as the on'yomi pronunciation of the Japanese word for "sea" is kai (海). In the game's ending, Kairi splits from Sora due to their different paths, which cues the start of Hikaru Utada's song "Hikari", a moment director Tetsuya Nomura particularly enjoyed. A similar scene was used for the ending of Kingdom Hearts II, with Kairi receiving Sora on Destiny Islands as Utada's song "Passion" plays. Nomura wanted it to be a short moment, which prompted his teammates to tell him it felt cold. In the post-credit scene, Kairi, Sora and Riku read a letter from King Mickey Mouse, with their facial expressions deliberately left ambiguous.

In a concert for the series, a young woman narrated what was meant to be Kairi's letter while she trained alongside Axel for the events of Kingdom Hearts III. For the Re Mind DLC, Nomura decided to re-explore Kairi's role in the final battle against Xehanort, showing the climax of Kingdom Hearts III from a different point of view and making her a playable character in the DLC's climax. Following the game, Nomura had multiple doubts about who should be the protagonist of Kingdom Hearts: Melody of Memory. He considered Chirithy from Kingdom Hearts Union X before deciding to use Kairi as the main narrator. This led to the game undergoing multiple changes to focus on Kairi's characterization and story.

=== Casting ===
In Japanese, Kairi is voiced by Risa Uchida. She enjoyed her work for the first game, but felt pressure upon her return in Kingdom Hearts II when she realized how popular the franchise had become. Uchida was conscious of what the proper pitch for Kairi should be; however, by Kingdom Hearts III, she felt she had a proper understanding of the heroine, despite calling herself presumptuous for saying so.

To confuse gamers about Xion's identity and her relationship with Kairi, Uchida was chosen to voice Xion, who bears a strong resemblance to Kairi, as noted by Riku in Kingdom Hearts 358/2 Days. Uchida has said that Kairi and Xion have seen different worlds, so she handles their deliveries differently. As a result, she pays close attention to clearly differentiating how they express themselves. While Kairi comes across as an ideal girl to her, Xion is more relatable, making her an easier character to voice than Kairi.

In the English localization, Hayden Panettiere voiced Kairi in the first game, Kingdom Hearts II, and Birth by Sleep. Alyson Stoner took over the role for other appearances. In Birth by Sleep, the toddler Kairi is voiced by Sumire Morohoshi in Japanese and Ariel Winter in English.

== Reception ==
In early installments of Kingdom Hearts, 1UP.com criticized the original characters created by Nomura for being less popular than the Disney cast, claiming that Kairi's relationships with Riku and Sora were not particularly appealing. In an analysis of the first game in The Kingdom's Shōnen Heart Transcultural Character Design and the JRPG, Rachael Hutchinson noted that the early characterization of Riku and Sora seems influenced by Sephiroth and Cloud Strife, respectively, to portray their rivalry, with Ansem taking elements from Sephiroth's appearance. The way Riku and Sora were forced to oppose each other because of Kairi's weakness was compared to the sense of loss Cloud suffers in Final Fantasy VII (1997) after Aerith Gainsborough's death. In retrospect, Ozzie Mejia of Shacknews noted that while Kairi is often used as a damsel in distress, she becomes able to fight in the sequels, most notably Kingdom Hearts II, where Riku gives her a Keyblade, while trailers for Kingdom Hearts III showed her training with Axel to prepare for the climactic fight against Xehanort.

In later installments, Kairi's limited screentime and the lack of development in her relationship with Sora led GamesRadar to note that fans instead began shipping Sora's and Riku's friendship as romantic, given the many cutscenes in which the two appreciate each other. Rebecca Phillips of TheGamer made a similar point, noting that Sora's relationship with Kairi in early games is what causes Riku's corruption, as if his possible unrequited feelings for Sora are not returned.

In "Kingdom Hearts III: A Conclusion without a Story," Joshua Hallaran of Game Developer noted that Kairi and Sora's relationship initially had strong romantic overtones in line with the romantic stories in Final Fantasy titles such as Final Fantasy IV or Final Fantasy X, as well as Disney movies. However, Square Enix's need to produce sequels to Sora's story negatively affected the development of that bond. The first game was noted in retrospect to feel mature despite the cast's young age, as Kairi maintains a strong interest in Sora throughout, regardless of a potential love triangle involving Riku. While Kingdom Hearts II developed the romance further through Kairi and Sora's interactions with their Nobodies Naminé and Roxas, the romance never becomes truly intimate. This is especially contrasted by Hikaru Utada's songs for the series, whose lyrics often focus on love.

Critical response to the character has ranged from mixed to negative, largely due to her frequent portrayal as a damsel in distress across multiple games, even after she gains the power and skill to fight in Kingdom Hearts III. This has also caused opinions of her romantic relationship with Sora to weaken over time, as their bond does not evolve and Sora is continuously fighting to save her rather than alongside her.

=== Portrayal in Kingdom Hearts III ===
Kairi has been criticized for her portrayal as a damsel in distress, even in her appearance in Kingdom Hearts III, in which she fights alongside Sora.

By the time of Kingdom Hearts III's release, responses to Kairi's character grew more negative. In "Kingdom Hearts fails most of its women", Natalie Flores of Polygon criticized Kairi's continued use as a damsel in distress and her relative inactivity compared to other characters. Flores added that, while trailers for Kingdom Hearts III promised the heroine would become a more capable fighter due to her training with Axel, she is ultimately nearly killed by Xehanort, forcing Sora to save her again. This was particularly frustrating given hints from the developers' official Twitter accounts that, this time, Kairi would take a more heroic role to protect Sora.

In "A Girl Worth Fighting For: Kingdom Hearts III and the mystery of the missing heroines", Dee of Anime Feminist agreed about the franchise's handling of Kairi as a young girl whom Sora must constantly save. While her cutscenes in Kingdom Hearts II showed promise of her becoming a stronger character now that she could wield a Keyblade, Dee heavily criticized Kingdom Hearts III for sidelining her into a nearly useless role in the final battle despite the buildup; she is nearly killed by Xehanort after being taken by Xemnas, who uses her life to motivate Sora.

Kairi's playable appearance in the Re Mind DLC was also met with lukewarm responses. Ozzie Mejia of Shacknews noted that she was still designed as a relatively weak fighter, making the rematch against Xehanort feel underwhelming even with Sora's assistance. Kimberly Wallace of Game Informer said that Square Enix only gave her one fight in the entire franchise and that her floaty attacks lacked a sense of impact.
