= Kingdom Hearts HD 2.5 Remix =

Remastered video game collection

- Developer: Square Enix 1st Production Department
- Publisher: Square Enix
- Directors: Tetsuya Nomura; Tai Yasue
- Producer: Rie Nishi
- Designer: Tetsuya Nomura
- Writers: Kazushige Nojima; Daisuke Watanabe; Masaru Oka
- Composer: Yoko Shimomura
- Series: Kingdom Hearts
- Platforms: PlayStation 3; PlayStation 4; Xbox One; Windows; Nintendo Switch; Nintendo Switch 2; PlayStation 5; Xbox Series X/S
- Release: PlayStation 3: JP: October 2, 2014; NA: December 2, 2014; AU: December 4, 2014; EU: December 5, 2014; HD 1.5 + 2.5 Remix; PlayStation 4: JP: March 9, 2017; NA: March 28, 2017; PAL: March 31, 2017; Xbox One: WW: February 18, 2020; Windows: WW: March 30, 2021; Nintendo Switch: WW: February 10, 2022 *^{Cloud}; WW: October 8, 2026 *^{Native}; Switch 2, PS5, Xbox Series X/S: WW: October 8, 2026
- Genre: Action role-playing
- Mode: Single-player

Kingdom Hearts HD 2.5 Remix (Note: Kingudamu Hātsu HD 2.5 Rimikkusu (Japanese: キングダム ハーツ HD 2.5 リミックス; stylized as Kingdom Hearts HD II.5 ReMIX)) is an HD remastered collection of the Kingdom Hearts series, developed and published by Square Enix. A successor to the series' HD 1.5 Remix collection, it was released for the PlayStation 3 in Japan in October 2014 and internationally two months later.

Kingdom Hearts HD 2.5 Remix includes Kingdom Hearts II Final Mix (Note: "Final Mix" is a term often used for versions of Kingdom Hearts with remade graphics, gameplay tweaks, expanded and clarified story elements and bonuses features.) (2007) and Kingdom Hearts Birth by Sleep Final Mix (2011) in high definition and with Trophy support. Additionally, the collection features a cinematic remake of Kingdom Hearts Re:coded that features remastered cutscenes from the original game as well as new content. A third collection, Kingdom Hearts HD 2.8 Final Chapter Prologue, was released on January 24, 2017. 2.5 Remix was released in a single, combined collection with 1.5 Remix on the PlayStation 4 on March 28, 2017, on the Xbox One on February 18, 2020, and on Windows via Epic Games Store and Steam on March 30, 2021, and June 13, 2024, respectively. A cloud version of the collection was released for the Nintendo Switch on February 10, 2022, with a native port replacing it on October 8, 2026. The collection also released on the Nintendo Switch 2, PlayStation 5, and Xbox Series X/S on the same date.

== Games ==
=== Kingdom Hearts II Final Mix ===
Kingdom Hearts II picks up one year after the events of Kingdom Hearts: Chain of Memories. Sora, the protagonist of the first two games, returns to search for his lost friends. Like the previous games, Kingdom Hearts II features a large cast of characters from Disney films and Final Fantasy games. Organization XIII, a group introduced in Chain of Memories, also reappears to impede Sora's progress.

The backgrounds and textures of the game had to be adjusted to change from the game's original 4:3 aspect ratio to the HD 16:9. Additional imagery was added to the menu screens and Gummi Ship area to compensate for areas that were lacking from the ratio shift. According to co-director Tai Yasue, approximately 80% of the original audio was remixed, as well as additional orchestral elements added to the songs. Yasue said, "Yoko Shimomura's music is an undeniable trait of the Kingdom Hearts series, I feel like without the atmosphere she creates, it isn't Kingdom Hearts, so the mix of the final audio was carefully controlled but also provides a new depth to the familiar sound." Kingdom Hearts II Final Mix was released outside Japan for the first time as part of the collection.

=== Kingdom Hearts Birth by Sleep Final Mix ===
Birth by Sleep is a prequel to the original Kingdom Hearts, taking place ten years before the title's events. The game centers on the journeys of Terra, Aqua, and Ventus, characters briefly featured in Kingdom Hearts II, and their quest to locate the missing Master Xehanort and protect the worlds from creatures known as the Unversed.

Moving from the PlayStation Portable to the PlayStation 3 allowed the development team to add more details to the character designs, additional atmospheric sounds, as well as slightly tweak the gameplay system, now allowing camera control with the right analog stick. In addition, the Mirage Arena, a multiplayer component from the original game, was reworked to only be a single-player experience. Yasue said enemy strengths and AI in the arena were adjusted to account for this. The inclusion of the Final Mix version in the collection marked the first time for this version to be released outside Japan.

=== Kingdom Hearts Re:coded ===
Kingdom Hearts Re:coded was also included in the collection, featuring the Nintendo DS game adapted into a cinematic retelling, similar to how Kingdom Hearts 358/2 Days was included in Kingdom Hearts HD 1.5 Remix. The title is set after Kingdom Hearts II and follows the discovery of Jiminy Cricket's journal, which chronicles Sora's fight against the Heartless and Organization XIII, which is found to have two secret messages written by persons unknown. Once the journal is digitized for further analysis, the contents become corrupted. This leads Mickey Mouse and his friends to make a digital Sora to enter and repair the journal so that the meaning of the hidden messages can be deciphered.

For the Re:coded cinematics, additional events occur that were not seen in the original. Nomura added that new voice acting had been recorded and hinted at the inclusion of a new battle scene and a scene that ties Re:coded and Kingdom Hearts 3D: Dream Drop Distance together. Yasue revealed that approximately two hours of the total three-hour cinematic would be newly created content and subsequently recorded with voice acting, as well as featuring additional scenes that flesh out the backstories of other Kingdom Hearts titles.

== Development ==
In the credits of Kingdom Hearts HD 1.5 Remix, clips of the games featured in this collection were shown, hinting at the collection. Additionally, when IGN interviewed Shinji Hashimoto about Kingdom Hearts III, he stated that the studio would consider another HD collection if the reaction to the first one was positive enough. The collection was announced on October 14, 2013, exclusively for the PlayStation 3. As with HD 1.5 Remix, the collection was developed mainly by the Square Enix 1st Production Department in Osaka, along with Square Enix's Tokyo team. In July 2017, Tetsuya Nomura spoke on bringing the collection to the Xbox One, saying he did not believe there was much demand for it outside of North America, but felt it could be a possibility after Square Enix completed development on Kingdom Hearts III. At the X019 event in November 2019, Hashimoto and Ichiro Hazama announced that the collection along with 1.5 and 2.8 would be released on the Xbox One in 2020; the collection was released for the platform on February 18, 2020. The game was also released on Windows exclusively via Epic Games Store on March 30, 2021, and later on Steam on June 13, 2024, following the expiration of the exclusivity.

In October 2021, it was announced that a cloud version of the game was in development for Nintendo Switch. The cloud release was discontinued on June 10 in favor of native ports for the Switch and Nintendo Switch 2, which will be released on October 8, 2026. Owners of the cloud versions are entitled to a discount on preorders, and will still be able to access the titles until June 9, 2027.

== Release ==
Kingdom Hearts HD 2.5 Remix was released in Japan on October 2, 2014, in North America on December 2, in Australia on December 4, and in Europe on December 5. Preorders for the game in North America and Australia included an official Disney Collector's Pin for the game. Square Enix also released the collection in two bundles in Japan, with both featuring Kingdom Hearts HD 1.5 Remix and a code to get an Anniversary Set for Kingdom Hearts χ [chi]. The first, titled Kingdom Hearts Starter Pack: HD 1.5 + 2.5 Remix, features the previously mentioned material and limited edition casing, while the second, Kingdom Hearts Collector's Pack: HD 1.5 + 2.5 Remix features limited edition casing, a promo soundtrack and a booklet with art from the series in addition to the previous material. A collector's edition for North America and Europe was also released, featuring both HD collections, a steelbook case, art book, Disney Kingdom Hearts pin, and a Heartless plush doll.

In October 2016, Square Enix announced a single-disc compilation release of Kingdom Hearts HD 1.5 Remix and Kingdom Hearts HD 2.5 Remix for the PlayStation 4. It was released on March 9, 2017, in Japan, March 28, 2017, in North America, and March 31, 2017, in Europe and Australia. An additional bundle, Kingdom Hearts: The Story So Far, includes the Kingdom Hearts HD 1.5 + 2.5 Remix PlayStation 4 collection and Kingdom Hearts HD 2.8 Final Chapter Prologue and was released in North America on October 30, 2018 for the PlayStation 4.

== Reception ==
Reception

Aggregate scores
| Aggregator | Score |
|---|---|
| Metacritic | 81/100 |
| OpenCritic | 88% recommend (Note: Based on 50 reviews.) |

Review scores
| Publication | Score |
|---|---|
| Electronic Gaming Monthly | 8.0/10 |
| Game Informer | 9/10 |
| GameTrailers | 8.7/10 |
| Hardcore Gamer | 4/5 |
| IGN | 8.4/10 |

The collection sold 84,935 units during its first week of release in Japan and since sales figures were last reported for the game on November 9, 2014, 129,660 units have been sold in Japan.

Kingdom Hearts HD 2.5 Remix received "generally favorable" reviews, according to video game review aggregator Metacritic. Game Informer praised the collection, praising the upgrades to Kingdom Hearts II, the transition of Birth By Sleep from the PlayStation Portable to the PlayStation 3 and criticizing the Re:coded movie as just being "there for completionists and easy to ignore for everyone else." Electronic Gaming Monthly called the collection a great deal for fans of the series, praising the combat system and series charming characters, but noting the questionable overall narrative quality. GameTrailers noted the improved selection of games over the 1.5 Remix, extolling the inclusion of two of the Kingdom Hearts series best games in the collection, as well as previously Japan-only content such as special boss battles. They also praised the new music arrangements and the cinematic retelling of Re:coded, though this was not a universally shared opinion. IGN propounded the same points, noting the improved music, graphics, and "high-level challenges", but criticized the aging controls from Kingdom Hearts II and the camera system in Birth by Sleep. Hardcore Gamer had more mixed views of the collection, noting that the games were not cutting edge graphically, particularly Kingdom Hearts: Birth By Sleep Final Mix, but was still a major improvement.

== HD 2.8 Final Chapter Prologue ==
In the credits of HD 2.5 Remix, clips of Kingdom Hearts 3D: Dream Drop Distance were shown as well as the inclusion of a secret ending related to the game, hinting at a possible additional collection. In September 2015, Square Enix announced Kingdom Hearts HD 2.8 Final Chapter Prologue. The collection features an HD remaster of Dream Drop Distance as well as Kingdom Hearts χ Back Cover, a cinematic retelling of Kingdom Hearts χ and Kingdom Hearts 0.2: Birth by Sleep – A Fragmentary Passage, a new game taking place after the events of the original Birth by Sleep, told from the perspective of Aqua. It was released on January 12, 2017 in Japan and January 24, 2017 for other countries.
