= Xion (Kingdom Hearts) =

- Kingdom Hearts character
- Xion by Tetsuya Nomura
- First game: Kingdom Hearts 358/2 Days (2009)
- Created by: Tomoko Tanemaki
- Designed by: Tetsuya Nomura
- Voiced by: Alyson Stoner (2009–present); Hayden Panettiere (2010–2012); Risa Uchida (Japanese)

Xion (Japanese: シオン, Hepburn: Shion; English: /ˈʃiːoʊn/ SHEE-ohn) is a fictional character from Square Enix's video game franchise Kingdom Hearts. She was introduced in the 2009 game Kingdom Hearts 358/2 Days as the newest and de facto fourteenth member of Organization XIII, a group composed of Nobodies, beings created from people who lost their heart. In her time working for Organization XIII, Xion befriends Roxas, another new member from the Organization, as well as veteran member Axel. In contrast to her comrades, Xion does not bear memories from her original self; instead, she starts receiving memories from other people. This leads her to learn about her true nature as a replica of Sora, the series' protagonist and Roxas' original self, as well as what she should do. She returns as a supporting character and boss fight in the sequel Kingdom Hearts III.

Xion was conceptualized during development of the game Kingdom Hearts II, in which the staff wanted to explain the reason why Roxas left Organization XIII. Additionally, the staff wanted to create a new member who was different in nature from the other members. While scenario writer Tomoko Tanemaki came up with the idea for her character, director Tetsuya Nomura designed her. In the Japanese version, the character is voiced by Risa Uchida. In the English version, she is voiced by Alyson Stoner in most appearances, with Hayden Panettiere voicing her in select games.

Xion's character has been well received by video game publications due to her role in 358/2 Days as well as her relationship with Roxas and Axel. The character's origins and relationship with Sora led to discussions about queer themes and existentialism in Kingdom Hearts 358/2 Days, whereas her return in Kingdom Hearts III was generally the subject of positive response for the closure to her arc.

== Appearances ==
Xion appears in Kingdom Hearts 358/2 Days as the newest member of Organization XIII. During her time with the Organization, Xion befriends fellow member Roxas who, like her, has the ability to summon the Keyblade weapon to capture hearts for the Organization's ambition, involving elimination of creatures called Heartless. She also befriends Axel after he and Roxas cover for her when she temporarily loses her ability to use the Keyblade. Later in the game, she begins questioning her nature of existence after being defeated by the Organization impostor Riku and experiencing several memories unknown to her. She discovers that she is an imperfect replica of Sora who was created by the Organization from his memories to duplicate Roxas's powers, and that her existence prevents Sora from regaining the memories he lost during the events of Kingdom Hearts: Chain of Memories. Xion is torn between staying with her friends and merging with Sora, but decides to leave the Organization to protect Roxas after realizing that Sora's memories are making her stronger while weakening Roxas. However, Axel is forced to capture her and return her to the Organization's leader Xemnas, who reprograms her to carry out her true purpose of absorbing Roxas and becoming a perfect replica of Sora. The fight ends in her asking Roxas to stop Xemnas's plans before fading from existence. Her existence merges with Sora, which causes everyone else's memories of her to disappear.

Although Xion does not appear in Kingdom Hearts coded, she is mentioned as one of the people that, while gone, are connected to Sora's heart. Xion makes a cameo appearance during the secret ending of Kingdom Hearts Birth by Sleep as well as during Kingdom Hearts 3D: Dream Drop Distance. Her role in 358/2 Days is also reprised in Shiro Amano's manga and Tomoko Kanemaki's light novel adaptations of the game. In Kingdom Hearts III, the Organization recreates Xion from physical records of her existence to serve as one of Xehanort's thirteen "seekers of darkness", but she regains her memories from Sora's heart and reunites with her friends as an ordinary girl. The downloadable content (DLC) of Kingdom Hearts III, "Re Mind", features a data copy of Xion the player can face as part of a series of multiple boss fights, unlocked after all eleven data battles prior to her are completed.

== Creation ==
The idea of Xion's character was made during development of Kingdom Hearts II, a game in which the staff showed Roxas leaving Organization XIII. They thought that such an action was due to the influence of someone close to him and chose a female character who was of his age. Therefore, they started expanding on such ideas in order to build the story of 358/2 Days. The staff started to make her character starting with the reason for her existence in the story. Scenario writer Tomoko Kanemaki had the idea for her name, which convinced Tetsuya Nomura due to the several meanings it brought as well as Kanemaki's knowledge of the Kingdom Hearts series, being the writer of its light novels. Kanemaki explained the name's various meanings, such as that it corresponded with the character Naminé (ナミネ; lit. "the sound of waves") as well as the word shio (潮; lit. "Tide") and was an anagram of "X" and "No.i", the latter being an imaginary number. Another meaning of the name is the flower Aster tataricus (紫苑, shion), which can be translated to "I won't forget you" or "remembrance." Kanemaki came up with the idea of Xion being a replica when writing the novel adaptations of Kingdom Hearts: Chain of Memories, in which a replica of Riku was introduced, and she wished to expand that concept. Like Riku Replica from Chain of Memories, the staff initially had the idea that Xion was supposed to fight Roxas to prove she was a real person. However, such an idea was scrapped to keep Xion as a well-meaning girl.

The revelation of her being the fourteenth member of the Organization was meant to cause a stir and reflected in Kingdom Hearts 358/2 Days with the dialogue of the character Saïx. Ever since the start of her creation, the staff already decided she would have a deep connection with Kairi, and so based Xion on her but with a different hair color. Xion's black hair was requested by Kanemaki, as she wanted Nomura to design a black-haired female character. However, when they made a design of her, her hair was changed, giving it a different style from Kairi's. Although Nomura pointed out that Xion, Kairi, and Naminé had the same 3D polygon model's faces and differed only in their hair, he stated that the three had individual personalities.

The staff thought it would be boring if all characters from Organization XIII were Nobodies and wanted Xion to be an exception. As another means to bring confusion to gamers, the staff made Xion's hood disappear and reappear depending on which character was looking at her. This caused various misunderstandings in the making of the game, to the point debuggers often asked Nomura if it was a software bug. Yukari Ishida, another scenario writer, commented that the staff had to explain to h.a.n.d. the reasons for Xion's hood as well as how it should work in the game. Ishida also pointed out that the first part of the game revolved around Xion and wanted her to have a quicker realization about herself than Roxas in order to later influence him, and thus lead into the events of Kingdom Hearts II. Nomura later explained he made Xion to be a calm and pure girl, and wanted Aqua, another female character introduced later on, to contrast her personality. After trailers of 358/2 Days were shown, Xion was first believed to have been Naminé, but Nomura later informed the press that it was a different character. Nomura pointed out that she would still be a key character and that the reason for the Organization being not named XIV despite Xion being the fourteenth member would be explained in the game. A Pinocchio-based world was intended to be included in the game and feature a chapter focusing on Xion and Roxas "looking for hope for themselves", but such a story was not added due to system constraints.

Originally, Xion and Roxas were not meant to return, but positive response to his character led to their inclusion in Kingdom Hearts III. Nomura had mixed feelings about keeping Xion as a DLC boss, but co-director Tai Yasue persuaded him to do so. In particular, Nomura said that he designed Xion and Xehanort to be the hardest bosses from Organization XIII.

=== Casting ===
The staff wanted to bring confusion to fans and make them wonder if Xion was Kairi's Nobody, sharing physical similarities, musical themes, and Kairi's Japanese voice actress Risa Uchida. Uchida said Kairi and Xion have seen different worlds, and thus the handling of their deliveries are different. As a result, Uchida pays attention to clearly differentiating how they express these things. While Kairi comes across as an ideal girl to her, Xion is more relatable, making Xion an easier character to voice.

In the English localization of the games, Xion is voiced by English voice actresses Alyson Stoner and Hayden Panettiere. In Kingdom Hearts HD 1.5 Remix and Kingdom Hearts III, Stoner returned to voice additional lines for the character. Stoner celebrated the anniversary of 358/2 Days by repeating to a fan Xion's line "Roxas. That's a stick", which Xion says when he uses a stick as a replacement weapon for the Keyblade during the story.

== Reception ==
Xion was originally well-received for her characterization and role in Kingdom Hearts. Before Kingdom Hearts 358/2 Days was released, 1UP.com featured Xion second as a reason to play the game, comically claiming that it does not make sense that Organization XIII should welcome a 14th member. RPGFan praised Xion as one of the best female fictional characters in RPGs, citing her growth from a copy from Sora to her own unique identity caused by her bonding with Roxas and Axel. However, RPGFan's Ashton Liu found Xion and the other members from Organization XIII besides Axel and Roxas to be unappealing in contrast to previous characters featured in the series. In the 2009 Nintendo Power Awards, the magazine's readers voted Xion the "Best New Character" of the year. Destructoid sees Xion as the 7th best character of the franchise for her kind personality and friendship with Roxas and Axel, which evolves into a tragedy in her debut.

The A.V. Club sees Xion's death as one of the most embarrassing moments in Kingdom Hearts, claiming that while the story "is art", Roxas' last line to her involving wanting to have ice cream with her almost feels like a comedy. NintendoLife agreed, finding it a sad moment that still feels poor, not only because of the delivery, but because of the implication that Xion and Roxas are friends only due to their hobby. DualShockers found the character important for the franchise, though multiple newcomers who never played 358/2 Days would not understand who she is in Kingdom Hearts III. Many instead theorize Naminé is more fitting for a Nobody to Kairi, whom Xion's existence is related to. Her importance in Kingdom Hearts III was noted by the writer to be vital for Roxas due to the traumatizing state he had following her death in her previous appearance. Polygon compared Xion's death in 358/2 Days to the women in refrigerators trope, counting as one of the multiple mishandlings of female characters in fiction, which the franchise employs several times. However, the writer still believes Xion and fellow character Aqua are also an exception to the rule since they both have character arcs, with Xion having a notable growth as an individual in her debut game and a notable return in Kingdom Hearts III which serves as a suitable happy ending to her arc.

There was also commentary about the character's return in Kingdom Hearts III. RPGFan called Xion's revival and reunion with Roxas and Axel one of the most emotional moments in RPGs in 25 years. Vice wanted to see more of Xion in Kingdom Hearts III, criticizing how Sora is always the one saving the team and defeating the villains, and claimed that Xion was more flashy. Besides Xion's role in the story of Kingdom Hearts III, there was also commentary about her portrayal as a boss fight in the DLC content. RPGSite considered Xion as a fun boss battle like most Organization XIII members despite the challenge. Meanwhile, The Gamer regarded her as the third hardest boss fight in the DLC, especially when compared to her original portrayal as a boss in 358/2 Days.

=== Existentialist themes ===
Xion's origin as a replica of the male Sora and perception as a woman to Roxas was the subject of analysis. Regarding the multiple cutscenes the game offers, Siliconera believed 358/2 Days suffered multiple bugs because Xion's clothing constantly changes her appearance, which gives a sense of mystery. Nevertheless, Siliconera enjoyed Xion's characterization, especially when compared to the other antagonistic members of Organization XIII. Anime Feminist found queer subtext in Roxas' relationships, writing that Roxas recognizes the identity of Xion, a replica of Sora, seeing her as a female companion rather than Sora. When Roxas is forced to kill Xion in 358/2 Days, Xion obtains happiness that Roxas still sees her as her own person rather than another Sora.

PlayStation LifeStyle called Xion the "Backbone of Kingdom Hearts", finding the character fascinating due to complicated handling of multiple types of lives in the franchise. Both Roxas and Xion are related to each other as well as Sora, whom they originate from. The narrative of 358/2 Days demonstrates an exception to the rule that Nobodies need memories of their past lives by having Roxas befriend Xion, unlike the other members of Organization XIII who rely on their past lives. Despite the tragic nature of the game, the sequel Kingdom Hearts III allows Xion and Roxas to have their respective happy endings as they manage to reclaim their identities, and the writer claims that, by experiencing life, Xion deserves and earns her existence. GameRant claimed that both Xion and Roxas earned their revivals in Kingdom Hearts III, which the writer noted multiple fans were against. The writer saw Xion and Roxas as his favorite characters of the series and added that, in contrast to the endings of Kingdom Hearts II and 358/2 Days, they are able to live freely after having previously given up their existence to restore Sora's existence.
