= Riku (Kingdom Hearts) =

- Kingdom Hearts character
- Riku as he appears in Kingdom Hearts: Chain of Memories, wielding the Soul Eater
- First game: Kingdom Hearts (2002)
- Created by: Tetsuya Nomura
- Designed by: Tetsuya Nomura
- Voiced by: Japanese; Mamoru Miyano; Eiji Shima (young); English; David Gallagher; Ty Panitz (young)

In-universe information
- Weapon: Soul Eater; Keyblade (Way to Dawn, Braveheart)
- Home: Destiny Islands

Riku (Japanese: リク) is a fictional character in the Square Enix video game series Kingdom Hearts. Debuting in the original Kingdom Hearts, Riku is introduced as a teenager who wishes to visit other worlds with his friends Sora and Kairi. After their home world of Destiny Islands is destroyed, Riku meets Maleficent, whose manipulation causes him to oppose Sora and fall into darkness, being possessed by Ansem, Seeker of Darkness. However, he is freed by Sora and returns as a protagonist in subsequent games.

Riku was created and designed by Tetsuya Nomura, who wanted him to be a foil for Sora's character and his character arc to represent the series' main theme of being able to choose between light or darkness, with his design and story paralleling Terra. He is voiced by Mamoru Miyano and Eiji Shima in Japanese and David Gallagher and Ty Panitz in English.

Critical response to Riku has been widely acclaimed, particularly for his redemption arc and David Gallagher's performance.

== Creation and design ==
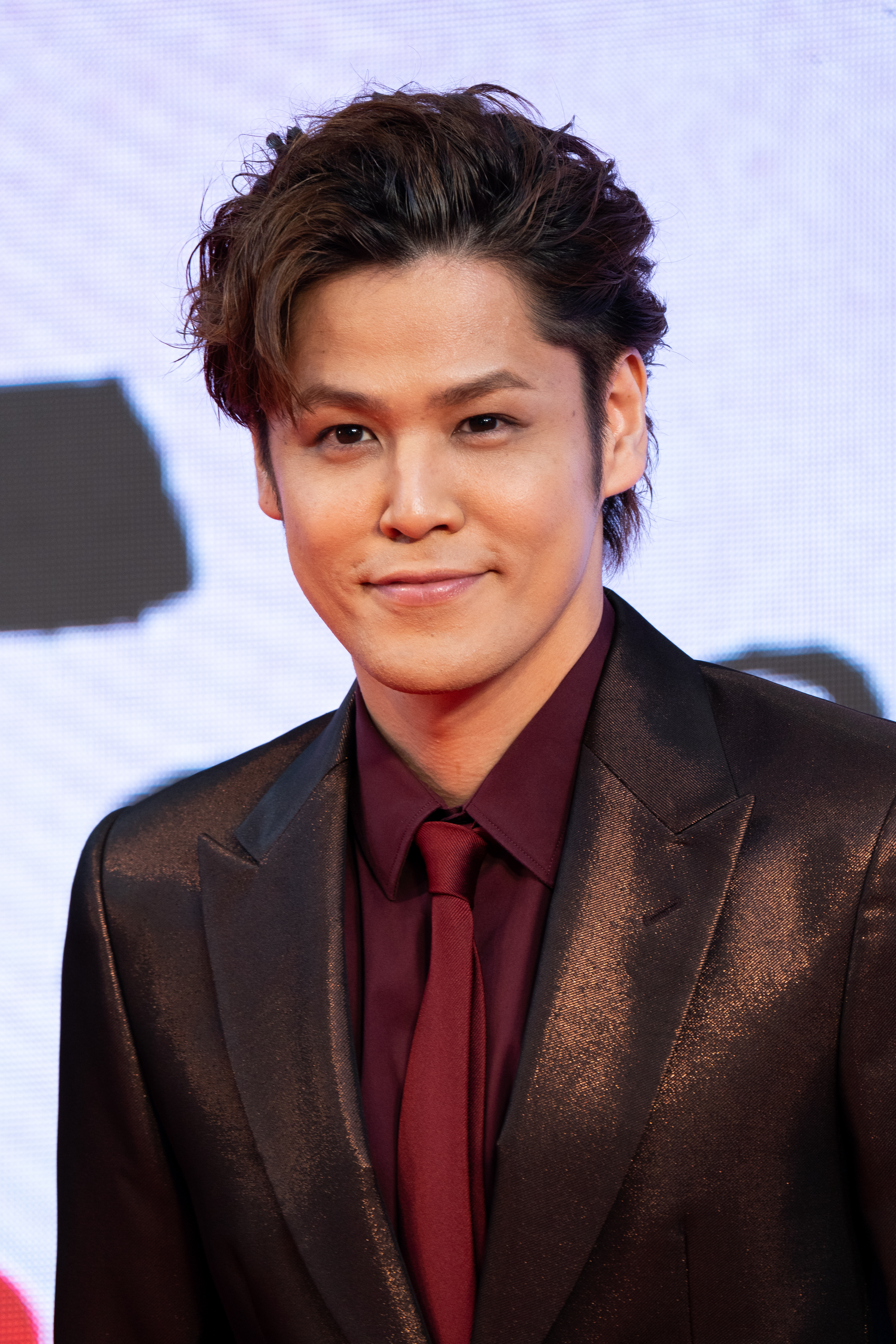
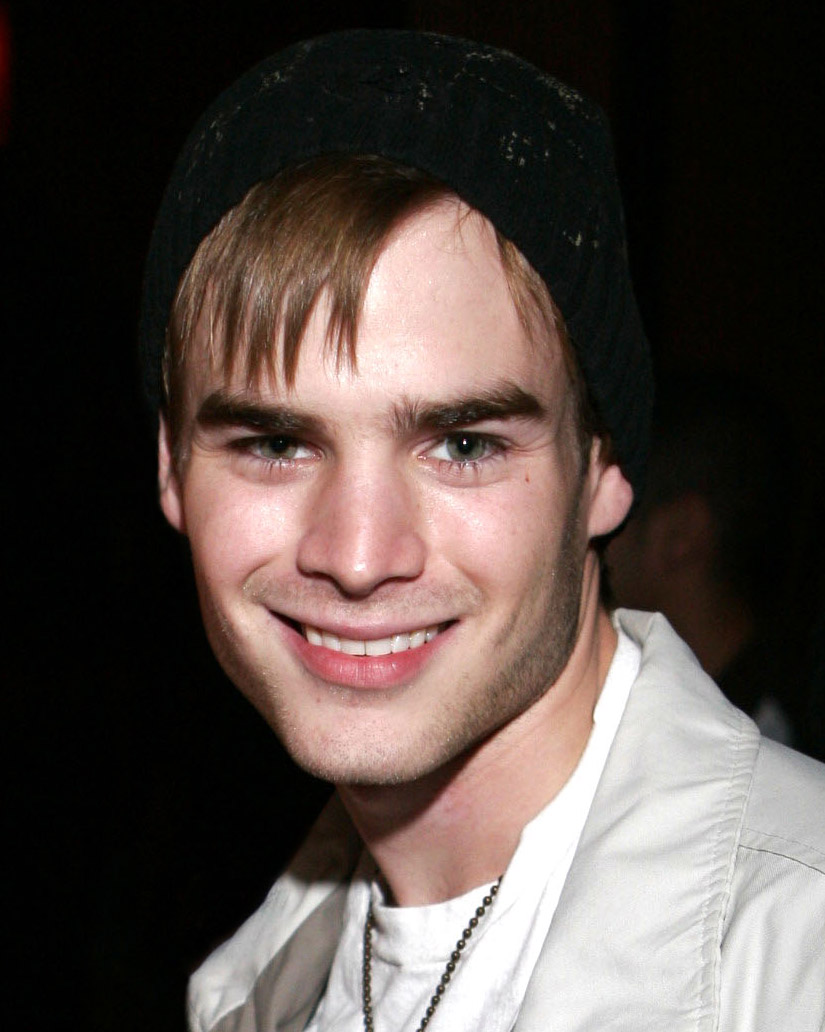
Mamoru Miyano (left) and David Gallagher (right) voiced Riku.

Kingdom Hearts creator Tetsuya Nomura has stated that Riku's name can be interpreted as "land", since the on'yomi pronunciation of the Japanese word for "land" is riku (陸), similar to how Sora's name is identical to the Japanese word for "sky", sora (空). Along with Sora, Riku's character represents one of the series' main themes, "the light and the dark sides of hearts".

In Kingdom Hearts II, Riku's Keyblade is Way to the Dawn, which Nomura designed to resemble his previous weapon, the Soul Eater. Its name is derived from a scene at the end of Chain of Memories, where Riku said that he would walk "the road to dawn." Though Riku has a minor role in Birth by Sleep, Nomura wanted to expand on his connection with Terra, who gave him the ability to wield the Keyblade and would later reunite with him.

On the character's role in Dream Drop Distance, Nomura emphasized Riku as the game's main focus, as, despite it featuring Sora and Riku as dual protagonists, it showcases his growth across the series. As a result of the game's plot, Sora and Riku appear in their younger forms from the first Kingdom Hearts game. To avoid misconceptions that Dream Drop Distance was a remake of the original game, Nomura decided to change their outfits for most of the game. For Riku's new design, Nomura altered his hair based on fan response following Kingdom Hearts II.

For Kingdom Hearts III, Riku and Kairi's new designs were made to fit with Sora's; while Kairi's main color remains pink, Riku's main color is blue in contrast to Sora's red, with their outfits sharing a gingham pattern due to being given to them by Yen Sid. Riku's new Keyblade, Braveheart, was meant to contrast with the Way to Dawn Keyblade.

== Appearances ==
=== Kingdom Hearts ===
Riku is a childhood friend and rival of Sora, who lives with him and Kairi on Destiny Islands. In the original game, where he is fifteen years old, when the Heartless invade Destiny Islands, Riku immerses himself in darkness to discover new worlds beyond his home. Upon arriving at Hollow Bastion, Riku is manipulated by Maleficent into aiding in her plans for world conquest in exchange for knowledge to restore Kairi's missing heart. He comes to wield the Soul Eater, a manifestation of the darkness in his heart, and is later revealed to be the rightful owner of Sora's Keyblade, which Terra bequeathed to him during the events of Birth by Sleep, when he was five years old; however, his reliance on the power of darkness caused the Keyblade to reject him in favor of Sora. He is later tricked into allowing Xehanort's Heartless, Ansem, to possess his body. Following Ansem's defeat, Riku sacrifices himself to help Mickey Mouse close the door to Kingdom Hearts, stranding them on the other side.

In Chain of Memories, DiZ helps Riku escape from the dark realm. Initially rejecting his darkness out of guilt, Riku resolves to wield both powers of light and darkness to battle Ansem, whose essence lingers in his heart. A replica of Riku created by Vexen, known as Riku Replica, appears in Chain of Memories and Kingdom Hearts III.

In Kingdom Hearts II, Riku acquires a new Keyblade, the Way to the Dawn. He is forced to harness Ansem's power to defeat Roxas and restore Sora's missing memories. As a result, he assumes Ansem's appearance, returning to normal after DiZ's heart encoder explodes. He and Sora return to Destiny Islands following Xemnas's defeat.

Riku appears in the multiplayer mode of 358/2 Days and in its story mode, where he contacts Xion and is the final boss, facing Roxas as seen in Kingdom Hearts II. In Dream Drop Distance, Riku and Sora undertake the Mark of Mastery exam in preparation for Xehanort's return. Riku is promoted to Keyblade Master after venturing into Sora's dreams as a Dream Eater to protect Sora from Xehanort, who attempts to use him as a vessel.

In Kingdom Hearts III, Riku and Mickey venture into the realm of darkness to rescue Aqua, with him being playable in several moments throughout the realm. He is also playable in the Re Mind expansion, where he obtains a new Keyblade, Braveheart. While visiting Radiant Garden, Riku analyzes digital copies of Sora and Organization XIII's members in hopes of uncovering clues to Sora's whereabouts. After the analysis proves inconclusive, Riku is approached by the Fairy Godmother and taken to meet Yen Sid, who suspects that they may find Sora through the dreams of him and two others. In Melody of Memory, Riku explains his dream of a modern metropolis to a girl known as the Nameless Star. She recognizes it as the city of Quadratum in her world and opens a portal for Riku to enter Quadratum and begin his search for Sora.

=== Other appearances ===
Riku also makes an appearance in Super Smash Bros. Ultimate as a spirit. He was also added into Fortnite as an outfit, as part of the game's Kingdom Hearts collaboration. In a collaboration between Square Enix and Japanese fashion brand SuperGroupies, Riku's image was used to create clothing based on his design from Kingdom Hearts III. A perfume based on the character was also released.

== Reception ==
USGamer praised Riku's role for giving the narrative a major impact as he takes over the role of the Disney villains in Hollow Bastion, defeating the Beast and taking the Keyblade from Sora. Though he is defeated, the reveal that he was being used by Ansem was noted as giving the narrative a darker tone. Paste Magazine stated that a vital part in Riku's characterization in Kingdom Hearts is that he embraces darkness, similar to Terra during Birth by Sleep. The inclusion of Riku in Chain of Memories as a playable character was praised by GamesRadar due to his enjoyable gameplay. Comic Book Resources listed Sora and Riku's fight against Xemnas as one of Riku's best action sequences in the series.

Riku's quest to be free and the sacrifices he makes in the first game to save Sora were commented on by William Humberto Huber from UC San Diego as symbolizing he and Sora's loss of innocence. The arrival of Heartless in Destiny Islands being caused by Riku's darkness was seen as an "allusion to the arrival" of Matthew C. Perry's ships in Tokyo Bay in 1853, which had a major impact on Japan.In the book Kingdom Hearts II (Boss Fight Books Book 16), Alexa Ray Corriea argues that Terra saw Riku's full potential when giving him the power to wield the Keyblade, claiming that, while Riku was a child when they first met, Terra saw through Riku's original intention of wanting to protect others, which may come across as a retcon when contrasting with previous installments.

Hardcore Gamer liked the inclusion of Riku as a playable character in the Kingdom Hearts III DLC, but lamented his few possible fights. The character's inclusion in the Tokyo Metropolitan Government Building during the Kingdom Hearts III secret ending was the subject of analysis as to whether he could interact with the cast from The World Ends with You as well as Yozora. With the end of Re Mind, GameInformer said that Riku came across as a more developed character than Sora, despite Sora being the protagonist. With the ending of Kingdom Hearts III and the first trailer of Kingdom Hearts IV, GameRant believed Riku should no longer appear in future games as across all games Riku has dealt with a character arc that dealed with his corruption to his redemption throughout his multiple encounters with Xehanort's alteregos. Although Riku keeps looking to the missing Sora in the end of Kingdom Hearts III, GameRant said that "After everything the character has been through, he deserves a break".

The performance of David Gallagher as Riku, along with Haley Joel Osment as Sora and Willa Holland as Aqua, was praised by GamesRadar and Hardcore Gamer as one of the best performances in Dream Drop Distance and Kingdom Hearts III. His inclusion as a playable character in 3D was also praised due to his dynamic with Sora. Koinya lamented the fact that Mamoru Miyano's work was never made available for a Western audience, considering him talented alongside Miyu Irino as Sora. In a poll from Famitsu, Riku was voted as the series' fourth best male character.

=== Relationship with Sora ===
Riku's growth after Kingdom Hearts and growing relationship with Sora in following games, most notably in their fight against Xemnas from Kingdom Hearts II, have helped to popularize his character and relationship

Although Riku and Sora are friends, GamesRadar stated that the several cutscenes they share in the first three games of the series often resulted in fans shipping them while ignoring Sora and Kairi's relationship. Additionally, Riku has LGBT fans who interpret him through a queer lens due to parallels seen in his journey with self-acceptance and real-life experiences of accepting one's sexual identity. Anime Feminist also saw Riku and Sora as potential lovers across the story due how sensitive both are portrayed whenever a scene involves the other. This is also expanded with how Kairi does not show notable interest in the other two as lovers in the first game. While Sora and Riku act antagonistic to each other in the first game, Chain of Memories and Kingdom Hearts II were analyzed by the writer to feel like an attempt to fix their relationship in such a way that Riku's character rotates more around Sora's now that he lost his romantic interest on Kairi. The subtext is downplayed in Kingdom Hearts III as Kairi cements her feelings on Sora, making them look like a couple.

In The Kingdom's Shōnen Heart Transcultural Character Design and the JRPG, Rachael Hutchinson noted that the early characterization of Riku and Sora seems to be influenced by that of Sephiroth and Cloud Strife, respectively, in order to portray their rivalry, with Ansem taking elements from Sephiroth's appearance. Riku and Sora being forced to oppose each being caused by Kairi's weakness was compared to the sense of loss that Cloud suffers in Final Fantasy VII following Aerith's death. Riku's fate was noted to be similar to Tidus' disappearance in the ending of Final Fantasy X, with his return in latter games being compared to that of characters in shōnen manga as he becomes heroic due to friendship and perseverance, common themes in such manga. In "Kingdom Hearts II Is Full Of Bad Romances And Rad Bromances", Kotaku noted the biggest selling point of Kingdom Hearts II is Sora's obsession of finding the missing Riku to the point of overshadowing Kairi's story. The emotional reunion Sora has with Riku is noted to have a soft soundtrack with Sora acting happy and distraught as he finally found Riku, giving a major romantic subtext. However, the writer found it nonromantic despite how sensitive the portrayal is of the two male characters. This was compared to other male characters from Final Fantasy designed by Tetsuya Nomura who share strong friendships like Cloud and Zack Fair as well as Auron and Jecht. The bond Riku and Sora share also stands out in gameplay when the two fight Xemnas in the end of Kingdom Hearts II as well as how gameplay works in Dream Drop Distance. Following Xemnas' defeat, Sora and Riku have an emotional reunion as they confess how important they are to each other in a nonromantic way.

In regards to Riku's characterization in Kingdom Hearts III, TheGamer believed the English translation was not completely faithful to portrayal of the original Riku's feelings he has been expressing previous games; When Terra asks the infant Riku why does he want before giving him the ability to wield the Keyblade, the child replies by that he wants to learn what he wants to protect. In Dream Drop Distance, Riku gains this answer when saving a comatose Sora by solving Ansem's questions, knowing the power he wants is the one used to protect Sora. This theme is explored in Kingdom Hearts III in early cutscenes where Hercules tells Sora that the reason he became strong is due to finding the love he wanted. Similarly, when Riku and Mickey enter the Realm of Darkness, the latter remarks that the former became stronger in this world since the last time he was. When Riku reflects on this comment, he recalls his answer from Dream Drop Distance. While the writer does not claim that Riku loves Sora in a romantic fashion, he still views him as one of the most important things he wants to protect and the Japanese version was more direct and appears to reference Hercules' newfound strength.
