= Roxas (Kingdom Hearts) =

Kingdom Hearts character

- Kingdom Hearts character
- Roxas as drawn by Tetsuya Nomura
- First appearance: Kingdom Hearts (2002) "Another side, Another story"
- Created by: Tetsuya Nomura
- Designed by: Tetsuya Nomura
- Voiced by: English; Jesse McCartney; Japanese; Koki Uchiyama

In-universe information
- Alias: Key of Destiny
- Species: Nobody
- Affiliation: Organization XIII
- Weapon: Keyblade (Kingdom Key, Oathkeeper, Oblivion)
- Home: Twilight Town / The World That Never Was

Roxas (Japanese: ロクサス, Hepburn: Rokusasu) is a character from Square Enix's video game franchise Kingdom Hearts, who first appears in Another Side, Another Story, a bonus trailer found in Kingdom Hearts, and later as a cameo during the final scenes of Kingdom Hearts: Chain of Memories, before making his first full appearance in Kingdom Hearts II. He is a Nobody, born from series protagonist Sora after he briefly lost his heart during the events of the first game. Kingdom Hearts II reveals that Roxas is a member of Organization XIII, a group of Nobodies who recruit him for his ability to wield the Keyblade, a weapon that allows him to capture hearts. As a member of Organization XIII, Roxas bears the title "Key of Destiny" (めぐりあう鍵, Meguriau Kagi; lit. "Serendipitous Key"). He is also the protagonist of the video game Kingdom Hearts 358/2 Days, which focuses on his time in Organization XIII. Roxas is voiced by Koki Uchiyama in Japanese and Jesse McCartney in English.

Director Tetsuya Nomura has stated that Roxas is an important character in the series, and that Kingdom Hearts 358/2 Days was created to expand on his backstory. Since his introduction in Kingdom Hearts II, Roxas has received positive critical response from video game publications, who praised his development in 358/2 Days, commended the dilemma of being the Nobody of Sora, and having to come to terms with his fate of giving up his life to end Sora's year-long slumber during the beginning of Kingdom Hearts II.

== Creation and development ==
After his cameo at the end of Kingdom Hearts: Chain of Memories, the series' director Tetsuya Nomura was questioned learn more about the character, but he refrained from revealing too much, stating that he would become an important, playable character for the franchise. The developers wrote Roxas' story in Kingdom Hearts II to add mixed feelings to the game in a short time frame; after receiving a positive fan response to Roxas' scenario, Nomura concluded that it was well-executed. He also stated that Roxas' merging with Sora in the game was one of the most memorable scenes in the series for him. Nomura later commented that Roxas was one of the first characters created for Organization XIII and was always intended to be its thirteenth member. The meaning of Roxas' name was meant to be revealed in a scene in Kingdom Hearts II that shows the letters in the word "Sora" rearranged with the "X" added to expand the connection between the characters. However, this scene was omitted as Nomura found it difficult to implement time-wise. Since his debut in Kingdom Hearts II, Roxas has been voiced by Koki Uchiyama in Japanese and Jesse McCartney in English.

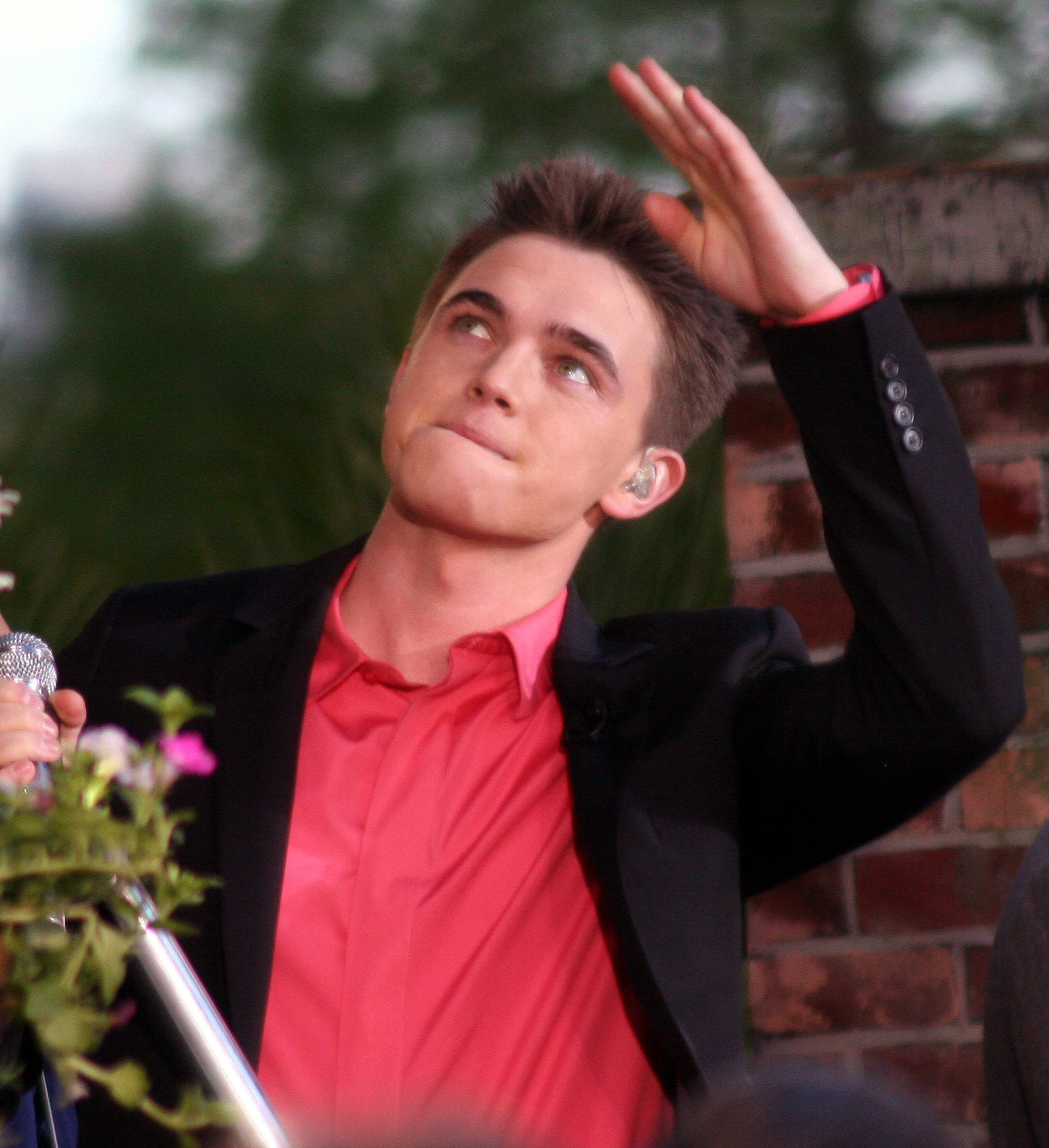
Jesse McCartney is the voice of Roxas in English.

After the release of Kingdom Hearts II Final Mix, Nomura wanted to expand Roxas' role in the series to explain the events between his birth and his disappearance from Organization XIII. For Kingdom Hearts 358/2 Days, the staff thought that Roxas' role as a member of the group would be a suitable theme for the plot. Moreover, Roxas was chosen as the game's protagonist since the staff felt that having a protagonist other than Sora would help to introduce gamers to the series' first Nintendo DS title. Co-director Tomohiro Hasegawa explained that Roxas was originally shorter, and the staff decided he should grow taller as the game continued to develop. Nomura wanted to portray Roxas' activities differently from Sora's, as Sora is on a journey around the world while Roxas always returns to Organization XIII after each mission. The staff constructed Roxas' interactions with the Disney characters differently from Sora's, as Organization XIII was meant to be secret in the game's story. Nomura told the writers that he wanted Roxas to learn something or have something to think about from each of his missions. Nomura later clarified that Roxas' personality was different from how he was portrayed in Kingdom Hearts II, as he does not actively attempt to come into contact with other characters. With 358/2 Days, Nomura wanted to reveal why Roxas left Organization XIII, and although he found it to be a sad story, he considered Zack Fair's fate in Crisis Core: Final Fantasy VII to be more tragic. Nomura felt that Roxas' last words in the game marked its most significant plot point, as he wanted them to connect to Kingdom Hearts II's first scene that is almost identical. Uchiyama expressed sadness when the game's development ended, as he would not play the character for a long time.

Kingdom Hearts II Final Mix's secret ending features the character Ventus, who resembles Roxas; Nomura commented that, despite their similarities, Roxas and Ventus are not the same character. He also said that when playing Kingdom Hearts Birth by Sleep, players would be able to distinguish Roxas from Ventus. In another interview, Nomura implied that the characters were related, specifically to Sora, but wanted fans to imagine reasons for such a connection. Additionally, he stated that in Kingdom Hearts III there was a possibility of Roxas's revival despite Sora being alive at the same time, which would be explained by the fact that Xehanort's Heartless and Nobody, Ansem and Xemnas, exist at the same time as he does. Originally, Roxas was not meant to return, but positive response to his character led to his inclusion.

== Characteristics ==
Physically, Roxas resembles Ventus due to his presence in Sora's heart during Roxas's birth. (Note: Kingdom Hearts Birth by Sleep Ultimania) Due to his nature as a Nobody, he is an "empty shell" of Sora, created after he sacrifices his heart and becomes a Heartless during the events of Kingdom Hearts. As a result, despite his teenage appearance, Roxas is one day short of a year old when he rejoins Sora in Kingdom Hearts II. As a civilian, he wears a white jacket over a black jacket as well as white trousers. As a member of Organization XIII, he wears a hooded black coat that covers most of his body. His weapon is the Kingdom Key (キングダムチェーン, Kingudamu Chēn; Kingdom Chain), a Keyblade that resembles a skeleton key with a silver keychain extending from the hilt and a Mickey Mouse token on the end of it. In 358/2 Days, the player can modify Roxas' Keyblade using the game's panel system. Roxas gains the ability to dual wield Keyblades after leaving Organization XIII, and exclusively uses the weapon's Oathkeeper (約束のお守り, Yakusoku no Omamori; lit. "Promise's Charm") and Oblivion (過ぎ去りし思い出, Sugisarishi Omoide; lit. "Passing Memories") forms for each hand.

Roxas' personality changes significantly across the series because, when he is first introduced, he has fake memories that make him believe he is a normal teenager and spends most of his time with his friends. After learning that he is Sora's Nobody and remembering his past, Roxas gives up his existence so that Sora can continue to exist, but expresses happiness for his fate. Unlike other Nobodies, Roxas lacks the memories of his human counterpart, causing his personality to develop separately from Sora.

== Appearances ==
Roxas first appears in Another Side, Another Story, a bonus trailer found in Kingdom Hearts, and makes a cameo in the ending of Kingdom Hearts: Chain of Memories. In Kingdom Hearts II, Roxas is introduced as a boy living in a computer simulation of Twilight Town. Unaware of the virtual nature of the city, Roxas begins to dream about the adventures of Sora. He later encounters Axel, a member of Organization XIII under orders to extract him from the simulation, and Naminé, a Nobody, informs him that he is Sora's Nobody. Shortly after meeting DiZ, the creator of the virtual world, Roxas learns the true nature of Twilight Town, and that DiZ altered his memory and personality to mislead his pursuers from Organization XIII until he can merge with Sora. DiZ leads Roxas to an old mansion where he rejoins with a sleeping Sora, allowing him to awaken. Sora later learns that Roxas is his Nobody, born during the events of the first game after Sora briefly became a Heartless, and was inducted into Organization XIII for his ability to capture hearts with the Keyblade. However, Roxas later betrayed Organization XIII and encountered Riku, who captured him to restore Sora. Roxas makes two appearances near the end of the game, first in a mental battle with Sora in a cutscene, and second alongside Naminé, who has merged with Kairi. In the re-released version, Kingdom Hearts II Final Mix, Roxas' fight against Sora is expanded, making him a boss character. The battle was meant to be interactive in Kingdom Hearts II, but time constraints imposed by creating fights for the other Organization XIII members prevented its inclusion. With the opportunity to include the fight, Nomura's team worked hard to make it entertaining for players. Additional scenes about Roxas' past were included in the game to add to the mystery surrounding him.

Kingdom Hearts 358/2 Days, a prequel to Kingdom Hearts II, reveals Roxas' life with Organization XIII. Unlike the other Organization members, he lacks memories of his previous life. Roxas is placed under Axel's watch and the two become friends. After Axel is sent to Castle Oblivion, Roxas is partnered with Xion, Organization XIII's fourteenth member and another Keyblade wielder, whom he befriends. Roxas reacts to the restoration of Sora's memories and starts questioning why he uses the Keyblade, causing him to doubt Organization XIII's motives. Upon discovering that Xion is a replica created by Xemnas from Sora's memories, Roxas is compelled to defect from Organization XIII to find answers and meet Sora. He is confronted by Xion, who Xemnas repurposed to absorb him so that she can become a complete replica; after she sacrifices herself by allowing Roxas to kill her so that Sora can regain his memories, she entrusts Roxas with freeing the hearts the Organization has captured and then return to Sora's heart. While heading to confront Xemnas, Roxas is approached by Riku who knocks him unconscious to help DiZ and Naminé wake Sora.

A virtual representation of Roxas appears as a boss in the mobile game Kingdom Hearts Coded, in which he confronts a virtual representation of Sora. He later appears in the ending as one of the people connected to Sora's heart who may return one day. Roxas makes a cameo appearance at the end of Kingdom Hearts Birth by Sleep, where he is shown with Xion and Axel eating sea-salt ice cream in Twilight Town, (Note: Square Enix PDD 5 (January 9, 2010). Kingdom Hearts Birth by Sleep (PlayStation Portable). Square Enix, Disney Interactive Studios. Level/area: Reconnect: Kingdom Hearts.) as well as in Kingdom Hearts 3D: Dream Drop Distance, where he contacts Axel and Sora through dreams. Roxas also appears in Shiro Amano's manga and Tomoko Kanemaki's novels, where he reprises his role from the video games. The book Kingdom Hearts: Another Report includes the novel Roxas–Somewhere in Time, which retells Roxas' days in Organization XIII, with the exception of him befriending Xion.

In Kingdom Hearts III, Roxas, Xion, and Naminé are resurrected after Ienzo, Vexen, and Demyx transfer their hearts into replica bodies, with Roxas joining the Guardians of Light in defeating Xehanort and closing Kingdom Hearts. Roxas and Xion join Lea on Twilight Town's clock tower—along with Isa, Hayner, Pence, and Olette—and eat ice cream together. They are then brought to Destiny Islands to celebrate their victory, where Roxas races with Riku and Terra on the beach.

Roxas also appears in Super Smash Bros. Ultimate as a spirit. He also appears as an outfit in Fortnite, as part of the game's Kingdom Hearts collaboration.

== Reception ==
GameSpy praised Roxas' presence in the series since his first cameo in the first Kingdom Hearts game, highlighting his fighting skills he shows in The World That Never Was. In a collaboration between Square Enix and Japanese fashion brand SuperGroupies, his image was used to create clothing. Roxas' character has been ranked twenty-eighth in a Famitsu poll featuring the most popular video game characters from Japan, while another poll voted him the second most popular Kingdom Hearts character, with his fight against Sora ranked as the best scene from the series. Roxas' popularity also led to the inclusion of a fan-made mod that replaces Sora with Roxas in Super Smash Bros. Ultimate. At the time of the character's official debut, IGN and Eurogamer said that Roxas was a likable kid with a sense of mystery. Game Informer emphasized his role as a "troubled boy", calling his story arc "an amazing chain of events", particularly noting that the revelation of his nature as a Nobody creates a "devilish yet remarkable plot twist", which may impact the player in a way that they "may not want Sora back".

In "Kingdom Hearts II" published by Boss Fight Books, Alexa Ray Corriea commented that the first hours of the game were the most boring, not only due to the common activities in Twilight Town, but also because Roxas lacks the same appeal as Sora to make an entertaining character. Corriea wrote that Roxas and Axel have a strong relationship in Kingdom Hearts II comparable to Cloud Strife and Zack Fair from Final Fantasy VII as well as Auron and Jecht from Final Fantasy X. The comparison is especially potent when Axel tries to revive Sora as he confesses he was the only person he liked in his life and Sora brought him the same feelings. Before Kingdom Hearts 358/2 Days was released, 1UP.com featured Roxas at the top of their "Why You Should Care About Kingdom Hearts 358/2 Days" feature, calling him "The darling of fanfiction and doujinshi writers everywhere."

Due to his resemblance to Ventus, video game publications initially thought that Roxas would be one of the protagonists in Kingdom Hearts Birth by Sleep. However, when it was revealed that the two were different, publications still discussed their similarities and whether there was a connection between them. In retrospect, Paste Magazine found Sora's story and links with his two alternative versions, Roxas and Ventus, to be more confusing than Solid Snake's relationships with his other rivals who were cloned from Big Boss in Metal Gear. While Game Rant opined that people were happy with his return in Kingdom Hearts III following several sad installments exploring his relationship with Organization XIII, MeriStation felt that Roxas' revival was not properly explored to the point of calling it a plot hole. Nevertheless, his reunion with Axel and Xion, following their split, has been called by RPGFan to be one of the most emotional moments in RPGS in 25 years.

Anime Feminist found queer subtext in Roxas' relationships writing that Roxas recognizes the identity of Xion, a replica of Sora, seeing Xion as a female companion rather than Sora. When Roxas is forced to kill Xion in 358/2 Days, Xion obtains happiness that Roxas still sees her as her own rather than another Sora. However, whether there was a possibility of a romantic relationship was not explored by the narrative. Roxas' relationship with Axel was also read as potentially queer due to the presence of kindness.

=== Existential crisis ===
Roxas' identity crisis and connections with other being is explored in the research article "Memoria: A Rhetorical Analysis Of Sticking To And Spreading From JRPG's And Their Fandoms" as Roxas also befriends Sora's replica Xion and both suffer their own crisis in Kingdom Hearts 358/2 Days. The writer sees Roxas, Xion and Axel as "Sea Salt Trio" for their obsession to rest together nearly every day in Kingdom Hearts while eating ice cream. The trio are able to express their own emotions despite the Nobody dilemma which is done thanks to their friendships and origins. Axel in particular becomes more sensitive when interacting with Roxas but have problems with Xion's identity as Sora's replica. The narrative delves into relationship with the characters and, subsequently, the players. Although Roxas only appears in coded as a data copy and such game is regarded as the worst game by The Gamer, the writer regarded the encounter between him and Sora's data to be one of the best moments in the series thanks to how they show their morals during Data Roxas' test; Across Roxas' test, although Sora expresses pain over losing people, he still claims he will keep living with the pain of having known his friends which is exactly what Roxas wanted to hear, eventually reaching the real Roxas' pain of missing his friends. Shazwin Bt. Sahmir and Norlela Ismail, in an article published by University Teknologi Mara, saw Roxas as a less conventional character due to his desire to live his life on a normal basis rather than be an adventurer like Sora. However, being forced to merge with Sora and stop existing to let him continue his journey gives Roxas a tragic end. While Sora does not undergo a notable character arc despite the game being a sequel, there are signs of Roxas having undergone one himself, encapsulated in this sentence: "In the end, after confronting Sora in his Heart Station, he gives in to the truth and become one with his true self."

Hayes Madsen, writing for Inverse website, acclaimed Roxas' prologue from Kingdom Hearts II for introducing him to the player as a normal school student who is enjoying his vacation with his friends until several abnormal beings attack him, eventually revealing him to be a Nobody—a vessel to Sora's character. A highly impactful realization that he just has been living a simulation until ultimately merging with Sora. The early segments in Kingdom Hearts II, where Roxas is told that his existence is a mistake, was relatable to Trevor Richardson from AIPT in context of his personal crisis as a queer. Thus, Richardson was heartbroken by Roxas' decision to give up on his existence to revive Sora, especially when revisiting his past in 358/2 Days. As a result, he yearned for a happy ending for the character in Kingdom Hearts III.

Tiago Clariano, writing in the paper published by University of Lisbon, noticed that the series frequently references hearts as analogies for sensibilities and some form of self-determination, exemplified by Roxas' phrase: "My heart is mine, no one else's". As a result of being Sora's alter ego, Roxas seeks to be himself, but in Kingdom Hearts II he is unable to escape his original self due to the nature of the Nobodies. Nobodies are not supposed to have emotions that define them but Roxas proves to be an exception. Madeline Blondeau from The A.V. Club newspaper analyzed Roxas' arc across II and 358/2 Days as he grows up in Organization XIII and eventually merges with Sora, interpreting the merge as his acceptance to grow up rather than death. When Roxas challenges Sora in a fight within themselves, Sora's victory comes across as a "psychological and spiritual victory" as Roxas properly accepts to be merged with Sora. The opposite happens in Kingdom Hearts III, where instead Sora the one who dies while Roxas is revived with the apparent freedom needed to become a normal teenager as seen in the ending.
