= Xehanort =

Fictional character in Kingdom Hearts

- Kingdom Hearts character
- Kingdom Hearts artwork by Tetsuya Nomura featuring from left to right: Ansem, Xehanort (top and bottom), and Xemnas.
- First game: Kingdom Hearts (as Ansem) (2002)
- Created by: Tetsuya Nomura
- Designed by: Tetsuya Nomura
- Voiced by: Japanese: Akio Otsuka (Ansem; Master Xehanort, Kingdom Hearts III); Norio Wakamoto (Xemnas); Chikao Ōtsuka (Master Xehanort, Birth by Sleep and Dream Drop Distance); Takanori Okuda (Young Xehanort); English: Billy Zane (Ansem, Kingdom Hearts only); Richard Epcar (Ansem and Terra-Xehanort, Kingdom Hearts II onwards); Paul St. Peter (Xemnas); Leonard Nimoy (Master Xehanort, Birth by Sleep and Dream Drop Distance); Rutger Hauer (Master Xehanort, Kingdom Hearts III); Christopher Lloyd (Master Xehanort, Re Mind and Melody of Memory); Benjamin Diskin (Young Xehanort)

In-universe information
- Weapon: Keyblade
- Home: Scala ad Caelum

Xehanort (Japanese: ゼアノート, Hepburn: Zeanōto; English: /ˈzeɪ.ənɔːrt/ ZAY-ə-nort) is a fictional character from the Kingdom Hearts series by Square Enix, in which he serves as the main antagonist of the "Dark Seeker Saga" story arc. He was introduced as the original form of the Heartless "Ansem, Seeker of Darkness" in the first game and the Nobody Xemnas in Kingdom Hearts II. Kingdom Hearts Birth by Sleep reveals the human elder Xehanort who, like his alter-egos, wishes to harness the power of the mythical Kingdom Hearts to recreate the universe in his image. While Kingdom Hearts III is the last major installment focusing on Xehanort, the 2020 mobile game Kingdom Hearts Dark Road explores his childhood and descent into villainy.

Xehanort was created by Kingdom Hearts director Tetsuya Nomura who decided to revise elements of the character when Square Enix greenlit Kingdom Hearts II. Critical response to Xehanort was originally mixed with his multiple alter egos being confusing to the audience. His further exploration in Birth by Sleep and his boss battles were the subject of praise.

== Creation and development ==
Xehanort was originally conceptualized by Tetsuya Nomura as a villain who would only appear in the video game Kingdom Hearts. However, when Square Enix was given the approval to make the sequel Kingdom Hearts II, Nomura put together an outline for the character. He was often told by the manga artist that they felt "the characters come alive however they want", and some parts changed from their original conceptualization. Nomura conceived Xehanort as a character whom the players study throughout each installment of the series. Ansem symbolizes Xehanort's heart while Xemnas symbolizes his body, leading to the focus on the original Xehanort in the future titles. In retrospect, Nomura believes this was properly explored, as each game builds up Xehanort's character until his full introduction.

The biggest change to Xehanort's character in Kingdom Hearts II is how his Heartless incarnation, Ansem, was revised as an imposter of the real Ansem the Wise, with more villainous traits. Kingdom Hearts II features another incarnation of Xehanort, the Nobody Xemnas, who is the leader of Organization XIII. The concept of Organization XIII began with Xemnas as the first member and Roxas, Sora's Nobody, as the last. Xemnas's name is an anagram of the name "Ansem" with the addition of the letter "X", which is revealed in Kingdom Hearts Birth by Sleep to be derived from the χ-blade.

The Organization's members wear black, hooded coats that shield them from the corrosive effect of prolonged use of the Corridors of Darkness, portals they use to traverse between worlds. Following the release of Kingdom Hearts II Final Mix, Nomura revealed a connection between the cameo characters and Xemnas, but wanted to leave it up to people's imagination, as he still could not reveal their identities. This was done through the fight sequence between Sora's predecessors and the unnamed elder, who is later revealed to be Master Xehanort, and his apprentice Vanitas.

Nomura explained that Master Xehanort wishes to bring back the Keyblade War and see what happens afterward with his own eyes. However, by the time he finds a way to accomplish this, he only has a few years left to live. Since he wants to become young again, he finds Terra and defeats him with darkness so he can take his body. The resulting incarnation, known as "Terra-Xehanort", is the man that Ansem the Wise takes in and makes his apprentice. In response to rumors saying that Sora's story would end in Kingdom Hearts III, Nomura answered that Sora is the protagonist of the series and that Xehanort's arc would end in such a title. In retrospect, Nomura said it was difficult to enjoy Sora's side of the story, instead enjoying Xehanort's character when making the narrative.

=== Casting ===
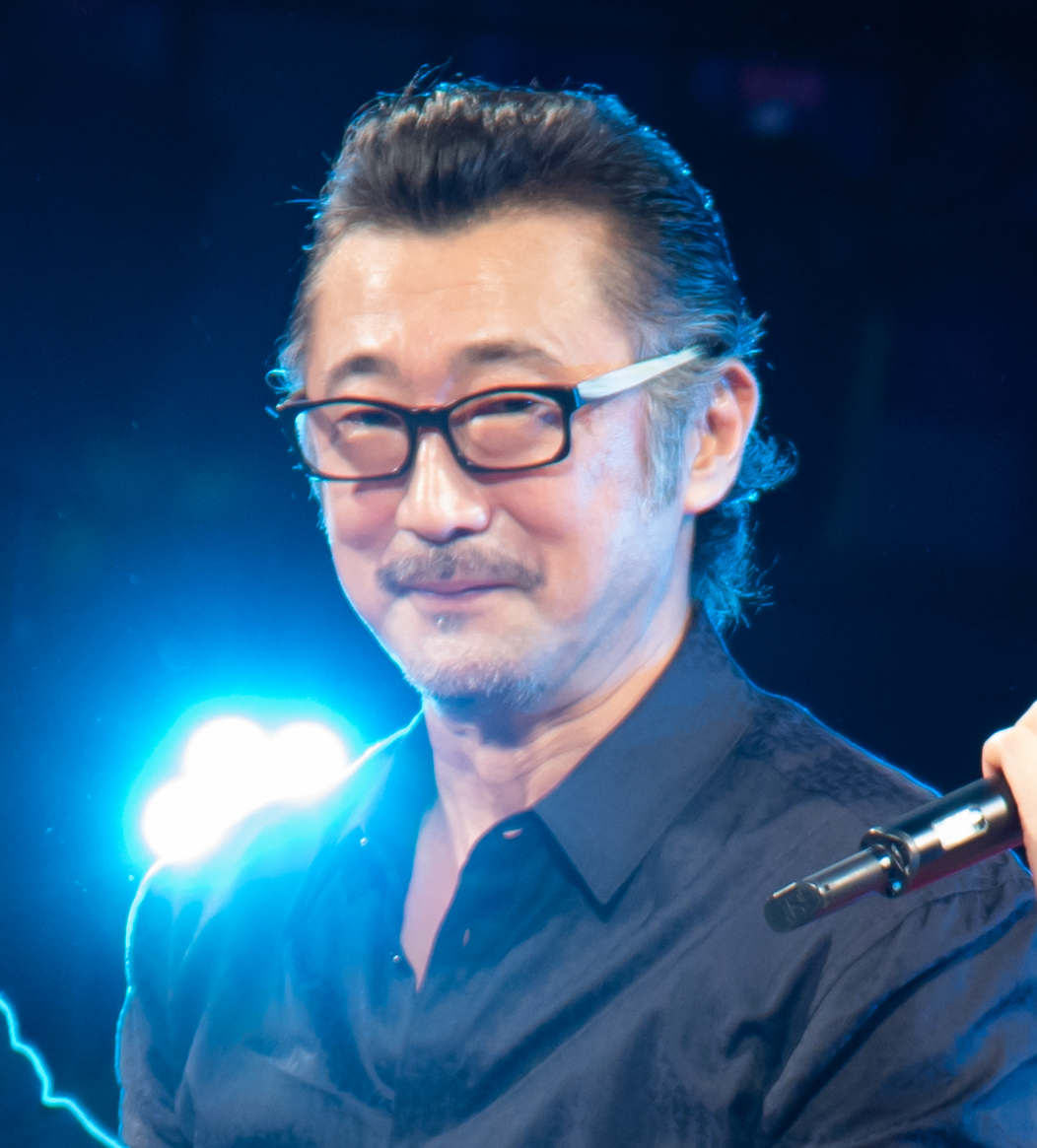
Akio Otsuka often voices Xehanort and Ansem in Japanese, taking over as the elder Xehanort following his father's death.

Billy Zane voiced Ansem in the first game, and was replaced by Richard Epcar for later titles; Epcar revealed that he was cast due to being the English voice of Batou from Ghost in the Shell, who was also voiced in Japanese by Akio Ōtsuka, Ansem's Japanese voice actor. Reflecting on his work, Epcar enjoyed his works in the Kingdom Hearts franchise due to all the people he met. Xemnas was voiced by Norio Wakamoto in Japanese and Paul St. Peter in English. Peter felt that the quick audition led to a positive response from the staff. He came to enjoy voicing Xemnas alongside Wormmon from Digimon Adventure 02. He found the role challenging, as he had to work as carefully as Wakamoto.

For the eventual release of Birth by Sleep, Ryōtarō Okiayu was chosen as Terra's Japanese voice, as the staff wanted an actor who sounded similar to Chikao Ōtsuka, Xehanort's original voice actor, and Akio Ōtsuka, Xehanort's later voice actor, who portrayed him while using Terra's body. The staff found Chikao's voice to be dry and Akio's voice to be deep and resonating, and liked how Okiayu bore elements from both actors. This eventually led to Xehanort's possession of Terra's body in Birth by Sleep and becoming the villains from the main games. Nomura claims a hidden message in Xehanort's last lines, when he hints that somebody else is in Terra's heart. After Chikao died during the development of Kingdom Hearts III, Akio was approached by the staff to take over as the voice of the elder Xehanort. Xehanort was voiced in English by Leonard Nimoy in Birth by Sleep and Dream Drop Distance. This was an intentional casting call from Nomura, a fan of Star Trek and Star Wars, as Xehanort's rival, Eraqus, is voiced by Mark Hamill. Following Nimoy's death in 2015, Rutger Hauer assumed the role in Kingdom Hearts III. Hauer died in July 2019, leading Christopher Lloyd to replace him in the Re Mind DLC and Melody of Memory.

Xehanort's teenage incarnation, known as "Young Xehanort", is voiced by Takanori Okuda and Benjamin Diskin. Diskin commented he had to manage his pitch to sound as young as Okuda. As a result, Diskin was afraid about his performance due to how the early trailers of Kingdom Hearts III could be received. Diskin had played the numbered titles of the franchise and thus had little knowledge about his character, since Xehanort's identity was primarily explored in the non-numbered games. Throughout the recording of Dream Drop Distance, no one told him what his character was going through, or what his motivations were. As a result, Diskin had little understanding of the narrative.

== Appearances ==
Xehanort is established in Kingdom Hearts Birth by Sleep as an elderly Keyblade Master from the Destiny Islands who acquired the means to transplant a piece of his heart into the bodies of others, which he uses to orchestrate the events up to Kingdom Hearts III to suit his agenda. Throughout the series, Xehanort is driven by an obsessive interest in the Keyblade War, a historic cataclysm that produced the universe's present, fragmented state. In Birth by Sleep, he attempts to use the hearts of his pupils Ventus and Vanitas to forge the χ-blade and unlock Kingdom Hearts to incite another war and create a new world where light and darkness exist in perfect balance. He transfers his heart into Terra's body to prolong his own life, but is defeated by Aqua and rendered amnesiac. In Kingdom Hearts 3D: Dream Drop Distance, Xehanort returns to his original form following the destruction of Ansem and Xemnas, who are revealed to have been created to re-enact his original plan. He intends to gather seven "guardians of light" and thirteen "seekers of darkness" in the form of the Princesses of Heart and Organization XIII, respectively. He uses time travel to assemble Ansem, Xemnas, and other versions of himself from across time into a new Organization, sending their hearts into replica bodies to co-exist with their present selves. In Kingdom Hearts III, after he and his past selves are defeated, Xehanort surrenders and allows his heart to pass on together with his former friend Eraqus. Xehanort's first playable appearance is in the mobile game Kingdom Hearts Dark Road, which explores his time training with Eraqus in his youth and reveals him to be the descendant of Ephemer.

Various other incarnations of Xehanort also appear across the series:

- Ansem, Seeker of Darkness (闇の探求者アンセム, Yami no Tankyūsha Ansemu), Xehanort's Heartless and the main antagonist of the first Kingdom Hearts and Riku's story in Kingdom Hearts: Chain of Memories. He uses Maleficent to gather the Princesses of Heart and produce the Keyhole to Kingdom Hearts, later possessing Riku's body to regain his human appearance. As revealed in Dream Drop Distance, his incorporeal form allows him to travel to the past to initiate Xehanort's teenage self. Following Ansem's destruction, his presence lingers within Riku's heart in Chain of Memories until it is destroyed by Ansem the Wise's malfunctioning heart encoder in Kingdom Hearts II.
- Xemnas (ゼムナス, Zemunasu), Xehanort's Nobody and the main antagonist of Kingdom Hearts II and Kingdom Hearts 358/2 Days. He is the founder and "superior" of the first Organization XIII, whom he manipulates into constructing artificial Kingdom Hearts to turn them into vessels for Xehanort's heart, as revealed in Dream Drop Distance. His name is an anagram of "Ansem" with an additional letter "X".
- Terra-Xehanort (テラ＝ゼアノート, Tera Zeanōto), the original form of Ansem and Xemnas, first appears in Kingdom Hearts II as Ansem the Wise's amnesiac apprentice, simply known as "Xehanort". He is created in Birth by Sleep after Xehanort's heart is transferred into Terra's body, confining Terra's heart within a monstrous vessel called the Dark Figure (うしろの人, Ushiro no Hito; lit. "The One Behind"). Despite his amnesia, he steals his mentor's identity while conducting his experiments involving Heartless and Nobodies. In Kingdom Hearts III, Terra's heart takes control of the Dark Figure and returns to its body with Sora's help, expelling Xehanort's heart.
- Young Xehanort (ヤング・ゼアノート, Yangu Zeanōto), Xehanort's adolescent self and the main antagonist of Dream Drop Distance, whom the Heartless Ansem summons from the past to assemble the "real" Organization XIII from his other incarnations and a certain member of the previous Organization. Though he loses his memories upon returning to his time, he remains motivated by the destiny "etched in [his] heart" to carry out his future self's plans.

A character resembling a younger version of Xehanort is set to appear in Kingdom Hearts IV.

== Reception ==
USGamer praised Xehanort's debut in the series for giving the narrative a major impact as he takes over the role of the Disney villains and possesses Riku's body. The scene is noted to gradually expand the series' lore, not only through Riku's actions but also because it explores the ruined Hollow Bastion, which is a former lively place now ruled by Xehanort. In the book Kingdom Hearts II (Boss Fight Books Book 16), Alexa Ray Corriea describes Ansem as a mad scientist whose multiple personalities would confuse the audience. Xemnas' early characterization was described as the "gray area" of the series since, during Kingdom Hearts II, the character and his group were not related to darkness or light. Xehanort manipulating Riku into using the darkness has been compared to Queer Lens due to parallels seen in his journey with self-acceptance and real-life experiences of accepting one's sexual identity, according to TheGamer. GamesRadar enjoyed the final boss fight from the game and noted that Ansem still manages to further corrupt Riku, labeling his resulting personality as unwilling to reunite with Sora. The handling of his next form, Xemnas, in Kingdom Hearts II was called predictable. This led to more criticism, as Ansem's and Xemnas' destruction led to the return of the original Xehanort, rendering the heroes' actions meaningless. Tiago Clariano from the University of Lisbon notes that the multiple Xehanorts have a tendency to contradict each other's goals, but, even in his final defeat, they are being played by an unknown force, Luxu, who will replace Xehanort in upcoming games. In "Playing God: An Analysis of Video Game Religion", Riku's inner struggle with Ansem and his eventual sacrifice to seal the Door to Darkness before the Heartless can cross through it was seen as a reference to the gates of hell being unleashed as demons are about to take over the planet. Riku's constant struggles with Xehanort and the darkness in his heart were compared to how Christians face the devil's temptation and choose the light of Christ instead.

CinemaBlend praised how the prequel explores Xehanort's character while highlighting how he nearly succeeds in defeating the protagonists. Another aspect of Birth by Sleep touched on by 3DJuegos was the relationship between Xehanort and Eraqus. In "How Kingdom Hearts Reframed Darkness", Fanbyte writes that Xehanort is the foil of Eraqus based on his research from his diaries and how their values of light and darkness contrast with each other. Xehanort's further exploration of darkness and light was compared with the writing of Hayao Miyazaki's work as well as Clamp's, especially X. Xehanort constantly performs experiments on the main characters to further develop his studies. GamesRadar claimed that Kingdom Hearts III further developed Xehanort in the ending when Eraqus' spirit contacts his dying friend in regards to how there is "more to light than meets the eye", referring to the chess game they played as children. The chess game was replicated in real life, with GamesRadar finding it ridiculously expensive. Despite calling him a mystery, HardcoreGamer said that Kingdom Hearts Union χ Dark Road further explores Xehanort's origins as it further examines the origins of the Keyblade weapons and their wielders.

MeriStation referred to the character in general as complex and manipulative, while at the same time redeeming in his final moments, as he accepts his defeat to Sora and gives him the χ-blade before moving on to the afterlife with Eraqus. Fanbyte noted that there were several theories about Xehanort's character within the fandom that could become true in Kingdom Hearts III. Two of these theories were whether or not the enigmatic Luxu was his true identity and whether Sora's replica Xion became another vessel carrying Xehanort's heart. GameDeveloper lamented that Xehanort's role in Kingdom Hearts III was poorly developed as Square Enix was more focused on developing the Disney properties, with Xehanort and his underlings having little screen time until Sora ends most of his journey. This further gave the ending an arc fatigue, as the player has to face all of Xehanort's incarnations in a single row without breaks.

In retrospect, Inverse claims that Xehanort was a villain shrouded in mystery due to his early appearances as a man possessing Terra until his proper introduction as Master Xehanort in Birth by Sleep. With Xehanort's eventual death in Kingdom Hearts III, Inverse believes that creator Tetsuya Nomura is aiming to create a proper successor to Xehanort, as seen in extra cutscenes revealing that one of the villain's comrades, Luxu, turned out to have his own proper agenda and is seen busy aiming for his new plans with other warriors. Nevertheless, the website found Xehanort to be one of the most incoherent characters in gaming due to the multiple plans he carries across the franchise. In La Légende Kingdom Hearts, Xehanort's multiple alter egos are noted to be enigmatic.

Billy Zane's work as Xehanort (Ansem) was noted by Kotaku in an article involving "cheesy video game voice acting", as the writer claimed "Zane's performance is a combination of rocky growlings and deep bass utterances" as a result of how many taunts he makes during the cutscenes, making the villain stand out. CinemaBlend enjoyed Leonard Nimoy's performance. Rutger Hauer's portrayal was praised by MeriStation, who noted that Xehanort was one of the actor's final works before his death. Christopher Lloyd's performance in the DLC was praised by TheGamer, as they believed he fit the character.
