= Tetsuya Nomura =

Japanese video game designer (born 1970)

- 野村 哲也
- Born: October 8, 1970 (age 56); Kōchi Prefecture, Japan
- Occupations: Video game artist, director, producer, game designer
- Years active: 1991–present
- Employer: Square Enix
- Known for: Final Fantasy; Parasite Eve; Kingdom Hearts; The World Ends with You

Tetsuya Nomura (野村 哲也, Nomura Tetsuya; born October 8, 1970) is a Japanese video game designer, artist, producer and director working for Square Enix. He joined Square in 1991, initially working as a debugger before moving into graphic and character design and eventually game direction. He contributed designs to several early entries in the Final Fantasy series, including Final Fantasy V (1992) and Final Fantasy VI (1994), before taking a leading role as character designer on Final Fantasy VII (1997), while also contributing to its story and battle direction. He subsequently designed characters for numerous further installments of the series, including Final Fantasy VIII (1999), Final Fantasy X (2001), Final Fantasy XIII (2009) and Final Fantasy XV (2016).

Nomura has also led the Kingdom Hearts series since its inception in 2002, serving as series director and lead character designer. He has directed or overseen the development of every installment in the series, including Kingdom Hearts II (2005) and Kingdom Hearts III (2019), while contributing to the series' story and creative direction. His other notable projects include The World Ends with You (2007), for which he served as character designer and creative producer, and directing the animated film Final Fantasy VII: Advent Children (2005). He has also been involved in the Final Fantasy VII Remake trilogy, serving as director of Final Fantasy VII Remake (2020) and creative director of its sequels Final Fantasy VII Rebirth (2024) and Final Fantasy VII Revelation (2027).

Nomura is known for his distinctive character designs, which incorporate detailed clothing and accessories, as well as for his layered narrative approaches characterized by intricate plotting, ambiguity and unresolved mysteries. He has cited Final Fantasy illustrator Yoshitaka Amano and several senior colleagues at Square, including Hironobu Sakaguchi, Yoshinori Kitase, and Hiroyuki Ito as artistic influences.

== Early life ==
Nomura's father influenced his interest in art and games early on, creating little drawings and unique Sugoroku board games for him. Nomura started drawing at the age of three years and developed his own Sugoroku games during his elementary school years. As a child, he spent much of his free time playing baseball, swimming, fishing and building fortresses. When he was in middle school, his father told him that an era of computers would come and bought him his own computer. Nomura played Legends of Star Arthur: Planet Mephius on it and started creating his own video games by learning programming. He first tried a Nintendo product with the tennis and ping-pong variant of the Color TV-Game console and later borrowed a Family Computer in high school. Around that time, Dragon Quest became Nomura's favorite because it surprised him and introduced him to video games with story elements. His art teacher in high school pointed him towards the works of Final Fantasy illustrator Yoshitaka Amano. Nomura also created his own manga during class and intended to do this as a profession although he ultimately abandoned the idea. Nomura went to vocational school to learn magazine and advertising artwork. Nomura then looked for an advertising job at a publishing company. However, he eventually applied to Square after he had seen a job advertisement with a drawing by Yoshitaka Amano.

== Career ==
=== 1990s ===
In 1991, Nomura was hired by Square and at first worked as a debugger for Final Fantasy IV. Some time later, the company's staff was divided and he was placed in the team in charge of Final Fantasy. After he had received some training by artist Tetsuya Takahashi, Nomura designed the monsters for Final Fantasy V. At that time, each Final Fantasy developer had their own plan book as a compilation of ideas to present to the director of a game. While the others typed their plan books at the computer and then printed them out, Nomura wrote his by hand and attached many drawings which impressed director Hironobu Sakaguchi and event planner Yoshinori Kitase. Nomura then became the graphic director of Final Fantasy VI. For this game, he conceived the characters Shadow and Setzer as well as their background stories. Their designs were reused from some of Nomura's abandoned concepts for Final Fantasy V. Following several smaller projects, Nomura was asked to be the principal character designer of Final Fantasy VII in replacement for Amano. Nomura drew the game's characters in a stylized and chibi way and came up with the idea for the "Limit Break" attacks. He also took part in the making of the story and had a hand in plot elements such as Aerith's death. In 1998, Nomura worked on both Parasite Eve and Brave Fencer Musashi. He then designed characters and monsters for Final Fantasy VIII in what he described as his "actual style of drawing", working alongside art director Yusuke Naora to realize the more realistic approach to the game's graphics. Additionally, he wrote the character's background stories and was the battle visual director in charge of designing fight sequences. Afterwards, Nomura worked on several different projects for Square, for example as a character designer of the 1998 fighting game Ehrgeiz which also used characters from Final Fantasy VII.

=== 2000s ===
Nomura was the character designer for 2000s beat 'em up The Bouncer before he returned to the Final Fantasy series in the same capacity with 2001's Final Fantasy X. He worked with the staff so that the characters' clothes would be identical in full motion videos and in-game scenes, unlike in Final Fantasy VIII. In February 2000, he started working as the director of Kingdom Hearts with the production team consisting of over one hundred members from both Square and Disney Interactive. Nomura first heard of the game during a discussion between Shinji Hashimoto and Hironobu Sakaguchi regarding the use of the character of Mickey Mouse in a video game. He was inspired to work on Kingdom Hearts by Nintendo's platforming game Super Mario 64. After discussing with the Disney staff, Nomura convinced them to use original characters with him as the character designer. The game's protagonist, Sora, became his favorite character he had designed so far. Following Kingdom Hearts, Nomura worked once again on the Final Fantasy series with Final Fantasy XI and Final Fantasy X-2.

For the Compilation of Final Fantasy VII metaseries which featured new titles based on Final Fantasy VII, Nomura was once again the character designer. A sequel to Kingdom Hearts started development around the completion of Kingdom Hearts Final Mix, an international version which added more foreshadowing elements regarding the series' plot. Nomura continued his work on the series with Kingdom Hearts: Chain of Memories for the Game Boy Advance in 2004. He had originally planned to work directly on the PlayStation 2 sequel Kingdom Hearts II. However, desire from fans to play the original game on a portable console resulted in the creation of Chain of Memories which would bridge the gap between Kingdom Hearts and Kingdom Hearts II. Afterwards, Nomura was the director and lyricist for the CGI animated film Final Fantasy VII: Advent Children which was released in 2005 in Japan. This marked his film debut, and he redesigned the characters as well. Nomura joined the film's crew after producer Yoshinori Kitase called him and eventually became the director because of his attachment to the character of Cloud Strife. He split the role of directing with Takeshi Nozue.

Kingdom Hearts II was released in 2005, resolving the elements foreshadowed in the first game's secret ending. As a result of being set a year after previous titles, Nomura was careful to make the plot accessible to newcomers. After Square Enix had finished development of the updated version Kingdom Hearts II Final Mix, Nomura was approached by Disney which expressed interest in a sequel. He said "We have various ideas, but we're not at the point where we can say that." Wishing to stop using the character of Sora temporarily, Nomura instead wanted to continue the series with games that explained different subplots. This resulted in the creation of Kingdom Hearts 358/2 Days for the Nintendo DS in 2008 which explored events that set up the story of Kingdom Hearts II. In mid-2007, Nomura mentioned a desire to create a spin-off Kingdom Hearts game on a mobile platform and wanted it to play slightly differently from other titles in the series. The result was Kingdom Hearts Coded, a game set after the events of Kingdom Hearts II, which was later remade for the Nintendo DS in 2010.

In the meantime, Nomura was also responsible for the main character designs and orchestration of The World Ends with You for the Nintendo DS. In 2009, he was also the main character designer of Final Fantasy XIII. The graphics capabilities of the PlayStation 3 and Xbox 360 compared to previous consoles allowed Nomura to use more complex elements in the character designs than before, such as Lightning's cape and detailed facial features. This in turn meant that the art team had to do much more work for each character or area than in previous games. Nomura did not take an involved role in the creation of the non-playable characters. In 2008, he was the character designer of Dissidia Final Fantasy. The game was originally envisioned by Nomura as a Kingdom Hearts spin-off featuring a cast of Disney characters. He later felt uncomfortable with the Disney characters fighting each other and instead opted to use Final Fantasy characters. Nomura was responsible for the character designs, which changed much of the look and style of Amano's illustrations.

=== 2010s ===
In 2010, Square released Kingdom Hearts Birth By Sleep, a prequel of the first Kingdom Hearts that explained scenes shown in Kingdom Hearts II and its updated version. In early 2011, Square released a follow-up to Dissidia titled Dissidia 012 Final Fantasy. The game carried several ideas Nomura had ever since early development, such as the inclusion of new characters and new gameplay mechanics. For 2011's Final Fantasy XIII-2, Nomura only created the new characters' faces as other staff members designed their clothes. Once the Kingdom Hearts coded remake was released, Nomura and his companions had already thought about creating Kingdom Hearts 3D: Dream Drop Distance, a game that would set up the events of Kingdom Hearts III. The game was released for the Nintendo 3DS owing to the team's positive reaction to the console's quality. Nomura confirmed that he would be considering what he called an "HD Technical Test" in order to commemorate the series' tenth anniversary and to entice players new to the series. This occurred on March 3, 2012 in the form of a premiere event where footage from the game, including its full CGI introduction sequence, was showcased to celebrate the game's release. In May 2012, Nomura revealed he was working as the director of a new Kingdom Hearts game that had yet to be announced by Square Enix. He was directing Final Fantasy XV which originally entered production as Final Fantasy Versus XIII shortly before its announcement in May 2006. Nomura left his position of director on Final Fantasy XV following "changes in development structure" by Square Enix in December 2013. After his departure from Final Fantasy XV, development of Final Fantasy VII Remake began, with Nomura directing the project and other key members of the original Final Fantasy VII development team, Kitase and Kazushige Nojima returning as producer and scenario writer. At E3 2015, Final Fantasy VII Remake was announced with Nomura confirmed to be the director of the game. Nomura designed the characters in the "Torna" organization for Xenoblade Chronicles 2. Nomura also designed bosses for the Eden raid in Final Fantasy XIV's Shadowbringers expansion.

=== 2020s ===
In April 2020, Nomura and Square Enix launched the critically acclaimed Final Fantasy VII Remake. He worked as the director of the project, character designer, and concept designer. After a successful launch, Nomura would go on to work on downloadable content for the game called INTERmission, which released in 2021. The follow-up Final Fantasy VII Rebirth was released in 2024. He worked as the creative director, concept designer, and character designer. Work for that project began in 2019. Third and final part of the remake trilogy Final Fantasy VII Revelation was announced for release for early 2027.

Kingdom Hearts IV was announced in April 2022, with Nomura again in charge of character design, story, and concept design. New footage was shown in 2026 but no release date has been confirmed.

Nomura also created art pieces for his characters on post cards which could be purchased in October 2022. He also created artwork which was used to introduce Kingdom Hearts IV, which displayed many of the characters he has created through the games long timespan.

=== Style and influences ===
Nomura considers Yoshitaka Amano one of his biggest inspirations when doing artwork. His four "seniors" Hironobu Sakaguchi, Yoshinori Kitase, Hiroyuki Ito, and Tetsuya Takahashi were also described as major influences. He even compared Sakaguchi to something "like a godly figure" during his early days at Square. At that time, Nomura was also taught the basics of game design by Ito. He told Nomura never to stick to existing concepts but rather to reuse just specific ideas and explained concepts such as ease of control and effortless accessibility of magic spells. Ito's work as a battle system designer inspires Nomura when thinking of the gameplay system for the Kingdom Hearts games. When designing characters, Nomura wants their names and outfits to be related with their personalities. An example occurs in Final Fantasy X where the protagonist Tidus was given a colorful uniform in order to reflect his cheerful personality and to contrast with the previous moody Final Fantasy characters. His name as well as Yuna's, another character appearing in the game, also have a common theme, the former being Okinawan for "Sun" and the latter Okinawan for "night". Various characters such as Squall Leonheart and Lulu are given multiple accessories, making the games more challenging for the programmers. When directing Advent Children, Nomura explained how the film was different from Western films due to the lack of direct answers from the plot. He added that he wants viewers to interpret certain scenes themselves and then discuss them with friends as another way to enjoy the film. The same occurs within the Kingdom Hearts series where the scenes that show unknown characters are left to the player's imagination until the following scene reveals it.

== Works ==
=== Directing roles ===
Year	Title	Role(s)	Ref.
2002	Kingdom Hearts	Director, concept design, main character designer, storyboard designer	
2004	Kingdom Hearts: Chain of Memories	Director, concept design, scenario supervisor, character designer	
2005	Final Fantasy VII: Advent Children	Director, character designer, lyricist	
2005	Last Order: Final Fantasy VII	Supervising director	
2005	Kingdom Hearts II	Director, concept design, story, main 2D character designer	
2007	Kingdom Hearts Re:Chain of Memories	Director, concept design, scenario supervisor, 2D character art: main artist	
2008	Kingdom Hearts Coded	Director, concept design, story	
2009	Kingdom Hearts 358/2 Days	Director, concept design, story, 2D art: main artist	
2010	Kingdom Hearts Birth by Sleep	Director, concept design, story, art	
2010	Kingdom Hearts Re:coded	Director, concept design, story, art	
2012	Kingdom Hearts 3D: Dream Drop Distance	Director, concept design, story, 2D art: main artist	
2013	Kingdom Hearts HD 1.5 Remix	Director, concept design, story, 2D art: main artist	
2013	Kingdom Hearts χ	Director, concept design, story	
2014	Kingdom Hearts HD 2.5 Remix	Director, concept design, story, 2D art: main artist	
2015	Kingdom Hearts Unchained χ	Director, concept design, story	
2017	Kingdom Hearts HD 2.8 Final Chapter Prologue	Director, concept design, story, 2D art: main artist	
2019	Kingdom Hearts III	Director, concept design, story, main 2D character designer	
2020	Final Fantasy VII Remake	Director, concept design	
2020	Kingdom Hearts Dark Road	Director, concept design, story, character designer	
2020	Kingdom Hearts: Melody of Memory	Director, concept design, story, character designer	
2021	Final Fantasy VII: The First Soldier	Creative director, character designer	
2022	Crisis Core: Final Fantasy VII Reunion	Creative director, character designer	
2023	Theatrhythm Final Bar Line	Creative director	
2023	Final Fantasy VII: Ever Crisis	Creative director	
2024	Final Fantasy VII Rebirth	Creative director	
2027	Final Fantasy VII Revelation	Creative director	
2027	Kingdom Hearts IV	Creative director, concept design, story, main 2D character designer	

=== Other roles ===
Year	Title	Role(s)	Ref.
1991	Final Fantasy IV	Debugger	
1992	Final Fantasy V	Battle graphics design, monster designs	
1994	Final Fantasy VI	Graphic director, monster design, character design (Setzer and Shadow)	
1994	Live A Live	Tosa-ben translation	
1995	Front Mission	Graphic designer	
1995	Chrono Trigger	Field graphics	
1996	DynamiTracer	Concept design	
1996	Super Mario RPG	Guest boss design	
1997	Final Fantasy VII	Character design, battle visual director, original story (with Hironobu Sakaguchi)	
1998	Parasite Eve	Character designer	
1998	Brave Fencer Musashi	Character illustration	
1999	Final Fantasy VIII	Character design, battle visual director	
1999	Parasite Eve II	Character illustration	
2000	The Bouncer	Character designer	
2001	Final Fantasy X	Character designer	
2002	Final Fantasy XI	Character designer (Hume, Elvaan)	
2003	Final Fantasy X-2	Main character designer	
2004	Before Crisis: Final Fantasy VII	Concept, character design	
2005	Musashi: Samurai Legend	Main character designer	
2006	Dirge of Cerberus: Final Fantasy VII	Character designer	
2006	Dirge of Cerberus Lost Episode: Final Fantasy VII	Character designer	
2006	Final Fantasy V Advance	Monster design	
2007	The World Ends with You	Creative producer, character designer	
2007	Crisis Core: Final Fantasy VII	Creative producer, main character art designer	
2008	Dissidia Final Fantasy	Creative producer, character designer	
2009	Final Fantasy XIII	Character designer	
2010	Lord of Arcana	Illustrator	
2010	The 3rd Birthday	Creative producer, character designer	
2011	Dissidia 012 Final Fantasy	Creative producer, character designer	
2011	Final Fantasy Type-0	Creative producer, character designer	
2011	Final Fantasy XIII-2	Main character designer	
2012	Theatrhythm Final Fantasy	Creative producer	
2013	Final Fantasy All the Bravest	Creative producer, original concept	
2013	Lightning Returns: Final Fantasy XIII	Main character designer	
2014	Final Fantasy Record Keeper	Creative producer, character designer, concept design	
2014	Final Fantasy Agito	Main character designer	
2014	Final Fantasy VII G-Bike	Creative producer, character illustration	
2014	Gunslinger Stratos 2	Character designer (Riccardo Martini, Sakura Ayanokoji)	
2014	Puzzle & Dragons Battle Tournament	Main character designer	
2014	Theatrhythm Final Fantasy: Curtain Call	Creative producer	
2015	Mobius Final Fantasy	Collaborative event support	
2015	Dissidia Final Fantasy	Creative producer, character designer	
2016	World of Final Fantasy	Creative producer, character designer	
2016	Final Fantasy XV	Original concept, character designer, lyrics	
2017	Dissidia Final Fantasy Opera Omnia	Creative producer, character designer	
2017	Terra Battle 2	Guardian character designer	
2017	Xenoblade Chronicles 2	Character designer (Malos, Jin, Mikhail, Patroka, Akhos)	
2018	Dissidia Final Fantasy NT	Creative producer, character designer	
2018	Final Fantasy XV: Pocket Edition	Lyrics, original concept, character designer	
2018	Xenoblade Chronicles 2: Torna – The Golden Country	Character designer of "Torna"	
2019	Final Fantasy XIV: Shadowbringers	Guest character/boss designer	
2021	Neo: The World Ends with You	Creative producer, character designer	
2022	Stranger of Paradise: Final Fantasy Origin	Concept, creative producer, character designer	
2023	Super Mario RPG	Character supervisor	
2026	Final Fantasy XIV: Dawntrail	Guest character/boss designer	
2026	Dissidia Duellum Final Fantasy	Creative producer, character designer	
2027	Street Fighter 6	Creative consultant (Tifa Lockhart DLC)	
2027	Final Fantasy XIV: Evercold	Art design supversion, Beyond the Lifestream raid series	

== Accolades ==
Nomura received the "Excellence in Visual Arts" award by the International Game Developers Association for his work on the first Kingdom Hearts game, alongside Shinji Hashimoto. In IGN's "The Top 100 Video Game Creators of all Time" Nomura was listed at number 84.
