= Ginpei Sato =

Japanese voice actor

Ginpei Sato 佐藤 銀平
- Born: October 19, 1977 (age 48); Tokyo, Japan
- Occupations: Actor; voice actor
- Years active: 2004-present

Ginpei Sato (佐藤 銀平, Satō Ginpei; born October 19, 1977) is a Japanese actor and voice actor, known from his numerous anime and non-anime works. He is most known for his roles as Saïx in the Kingdom Hearts series and Jin in Samurai Champloo.

== Filmography ==
- Samurai Champloo (2004) - Jin
- Kingdom Hearts II (2005) - Saïx
- Akagi (2005) - Hirayama Yukio
- Last Order: Final Fantasy VII (2005) - Turk
- Kingdom Hearts 358/2 Days (2009) - Saïx
- Kingdom Hearts Birth by Sleep (2010) - Isa
- Kingdom Hearts III (2019) - Saïx
