= Takashi Aoyagi =

Japanese voice actor

- Born: August 17, 1961 (age 63); Chiba, Chiba, Japan
- Occupation(s): Japanese literature scholar, college professor
- Website: www2u.biglobe.ne.jp/~BDN/aoyagi.html

Takashi Aoyagi (青柳 隆志, Aoyagi Takashi, born August 17, 1961 in Chiba) is a Japanese scholar of Japanese literature and college professor from Chiba, Chiba. He was the Japanese voice actor for the Disney character Mickey Mouse from 1991 until 2018.

== Biography ==
Aoyagi graduated from the Chiba Ritsu Senior High School and Chiba University. He also took a post-graduate course in the University of Tsukuba. He is a professor in Tokyo Seitoku University. He specializes in kanshi and waka. He formally provided the voice of Mickey Mouse as a side job from 1991 until November 2018, when the voice acting role was taken over by Takanori Hoshino.

== Roles ==
=== Dubbing roles ===
- Productions for The Walt Disney Company from 1991 until 2018 (Mickey Mouse)

=== Video games ===
- Kingdom Hearts (King Mickey)
- Kingdom Hearts Birth by Sleep (King Mickey)
- Kingdom Hearts Re:Chain of Memories (King Mickey)
- Kingdom Hearts 358/2 Days (King Mickey)
- Kingdom Hearts II (King Mickey)
- Disney Epic Mickey 2: The Power of Two (Mickey Mouse)
- Kingdom Hearts III (King Mickey)
