= List of Kingdom Hearts characters =

A piece of promotional artwork for Kingdom Hearts featuring the antagonist Organization XIII in the bottom, the protagonist Sora's incarnations across four games in the middle, and the supporting cast in the top including the original characters and Disney characters.

Kingdom Hearts is a series of action role-playing games developed and published by Square Enix (formerly Square). It is the result of a collaboration between Square Enix and Disney Interactive Studios, and is a crossover of various Disney settings based in a universe made specifically for the series. The series features Disney, Final Fantasy, The World Ends with You, and Pixar characters, as well as several original characters designed by Tetsuya Nomura. In addition, it has an all-star voice cast which includes many Disney characters' official voice actors.

The series centers on Sora, his friends, and their encounters with various Disney and Final Fantasy characters along the way. Players primarily control Sora, though there are numerous characters that join his party as computer controlled members. Most characters were introduced in the original game Kingdom Hearts, with subsequent installments featuring new original, Disney, and Final Fantasy characters. Dream Drop Distance introduces characters from Square Enix's The World Ends with You, while Kingdom Hearts III introduces characters from Pixar franchises.

Various types of merchandise modeled after the characters' likeness have been produced, including figurines and jewelry. The characters have garnered praise from several video game websites and magazines for the quality of their voice acting and visual style. Comments have focused on the accurate presentation of Disney characters, the unique visual style of Square Enix characters, how well all the characters blend together, and the consistent quality performances from voice actors.

== Creation and influences ==
Early concept art of Riku, Kairi, and Sora, original characters created for the series

The Kingdom Hearts series is directed by Tetsuya Nomura, who is also the games' character designer. Nomura has stated that unlike working with Final Fantasy characters, keeping the main character Sora alive and interesting over multiple games is a challenge. He also stated that though many of the Disney characters are not normally dark and serious, there were not many challenges making them so for the story, and despite this, their personalities shine because they maintain their own characteristics. Though Disney gave Nomura freedom in the characters and worlds used for the games, he and his staff tried to stay within the established roles of characters and boundaries of the worlds. When deciding which worlds to include in the game, the development staff tried to take into account worlds with Disney characters that would be interesting.

The inclusion of specific Final Fantasy characters was based on the opinions of fans and the development staff. Another criterion for inclusion was whether the staff felt the characters would fit into the storyline and in the Kingdom Hearts universe. Nomura was hesitant to use characters he did not design because he was unfamiliar with the background of such characters. For Kingdom Hearts II, he changed his mind after receiving pressure from his staff. Throughout the development of the games, Nomura has often left certain events and connections between characters unexplained until the release of future games. Nomura did this because he feels that games should have room for fans to speculate and use their imagination. He stated that with speculation, even though a game may get old, people can still be happy with it.

== Main original characters ==
=== Sora ===
Voiced by: Miyu Irino (Japanese); Haley Joel Osment (English)
Young Sora
Voiced by: Takuto Yoshinaga (Japanese); Luke Manriquez (English)

Sora (ソラ) is the main protagonist of the Kingdom Hearts series, and the sole playable character in the original game. He is portrayed as a cheerful 14-year-old boy who lives on the Destiny Islands with his childhood friends Riku and Kairi. When the Islands are attacked by creatures of darkness known as the Heartless, Sora comes into possession of a weapon of light called the Keyblade, and he embarks on a journey alongside Donald Duck and Goofy to protect other worlds from the Heartless, Nobodies, and other forces of evil. Nomura has stated that Sora's name can be interpreted as "sky", as the Japanese word for sky is sora (空).

=== Riku ===
Voiced by: Mamoru Miyano (Japanese); David Gallagher (English)
Young Riku
Voiced by: Eiji Shima (Japanese); Ty Panitz (English)

Riku (リク) is a childhood friend and rival of Sora who resides with him and Kairi on the Destiny Islands. He originally appeared as a non-playable character in the original game, where he is introduced as a 15-year-old boy, and has a playable role in the "Reverse/Rebirth" story mode of Chain of Memories, the multiplayer mode of 358/2 Days, and the core story of Dream Drop Distance. He is also a computer-controlled party member in the final level of Kingdom Hearts II, and is temporarily playable during a sequence where Sora is incapacitated in the game's final boss battle. Riku is also briefly playable at several points in the "Dark World" in Kingdom Hearts III and in its Re Mind expansion. His signature weapon is the "Soul Eater" sword, a manifestation of the darkness in his heart. During the first game, Riku is revealed to be the rightful owner of Sora's Keyblade, which Terra bequeathed to him during the events of Birth by Sleep; however, his reliance on the power of darkness caused the Keyblade to reject Riku in favor of Sora. In Kingdom Hearts II, where Riku is now 16 years old, he acquires another Keyblade of his own, the "Way to the Dawn"; this Keyblade is later broken in Kingdom Hearts III, leading him to obtain a new Keyblade, "Braveheart".

Riku also appears in Super Smash Bros. Ultimate as a spirit.

=== Kairi ===
Voiced by: Risa Uchida (Japanese); Hayden Panettiere (KH, KHII, BBS), Alyson Stoner (other appearances) (English)
Young Kairi
Voiced by: Sumire Morohoshi (Japanese); Ariel Winter (English)

Kairi (カイリ) is the main female protagonist of Kingdom Hearts and Sora and Riku's best friend. She is a non-playable character in most games, but debuts as a playable character in the Re Mind scenario of Kingdom Hearts III. As one of the seven Princesses of Heart, she was cast adrift from her homeworld of Radiant Garden at a young age as part of Xehanort's experiment to locate the key bearer, which eventually brings her to the Destiny Islands, piquing Sora and Riku's interest in other worlds. Birth by Sleep reveals that her arrival on the islands was the result of an encounter with Aqua, who gives the four-year-old Kairi a protective charm to shield her from the darkness; Kairi gains the ability to wield a Keyblade after touching Aqua's Keyblade. Nomura has stated that Kairi's name can be interpreted as "sea", as the on'yomi pronunciation of the Japanese word for "sea" is kai (海). Kairi also appears in Super Smash Bros. Ultimate as a spirit.

=== Roxas ===
Voiced by: Koki Uchiyama (Japanese); Jesse McCartney (English)

Roxas (ロクサス, Rokusasu) is the initial player-controlled character of Kingdom Hearts II, who is featured during the game's prologue segment. He is introduced as a youth living in a virtual simulation of Twilight Town, who discovers himself to be Sora's Nobody, having been born when Sora transformed into a Heartless to restore Kairi's heart during the events of the first game. He is also revealed to be a defector from Organization XIII, which sought to utilize his ability to wield the Keyblade. Roxas serves as the main protagonist of Kingdom Hearts 358/2 Days, which revolves around the circumstances leading to his eventual defection from the Organization. Roxas sacrifices his existence to merge with Sora at the end of Kingdom Hearts II's prologue, but is restored in a replica body during the events of Kingdom Hearts III.

=== Axel / Lea ===
Voiced by: Keiji Fujiwara (Note: Fujiwara also provided the character's battle expressions in the international versions of Chain of Memories.) (Japanese); Quinton Flynn (English)

Axel (アクセル, Akuseru) is the Nobody of a Radiant Garden citizen named Lea (リア, Ria). He is Organization XIII's resident assassin, entrusted with killing the group's traitors, and the original Organization's eighth member. He has the power to control fire, which he uses to empower his chakrams. He is introduced in Chain of Memories as a double agent under orders to dispatch the traitorous members at Castle Oblivion. He also appears in Kingdom Hearts 358/2 Days as a mentor for Roxas. The two develop a friendship, and he warns Roxas of the dangers of defecting from the Organization. In Kingdom Hearts II, Axel helps Sora reach The World That Never Was as an apology for kidnapping Kairi, and sacrifices himself to allow Sora to escape. In Dream Drop Distance and Kingdom Hearts III, his restored human self becomes a Keyblade wielder and guardian of light. Axel also appears in Super Smash Bros. Ultimate as a spirit.

=== Xion ===
Voiced by: Risa Uchida (Japanese); Alyson Stoner (Days, KHIII), Hayden Panettiere (BBS, DDD) (English)

Xion (シオン, Shion) is the de facto fourteenth member of the Organization who is introduced in 358/2 Days. Similar to Roxas, she wields a Keyblade and appears to lack memories of her past. Despite initially appearing to be emotionless and static, she eventually befriends Roxas and Axel and joins them on missions. Xion eventually discovers her true identity as an artificial human "replica" created from Sora's memories to duplicate Roxas' powers, which forces her to sacrifice her existence and others' memories of her to protect her friends. She is later revived as the final member of Xehanort's thirteen "seekers of darkness" before regaining her original memories and rejoining her friends. Xion also appears in Super Smash Bros. Ultimate as a spirit.

=== Terra ===
Voiced by: Ryōtarō Okiayu (Japanese); Jason Dohring (English)

Terra (テラ, Tera) is introduced in Kingdom Hearts Birth by Sleep as an apprentice Keyblade wielder who trains alongside Aqua and Ventus at the Land of Departure. Early on in the game, Terra is denied the rank of Keyblade Master when his mentor and father figure, Master Eraqus, detects strong darkness in his heart. Despite initially being disheartened, Terra is given a chance to redeem his failure when he is dispatched to eliminate an insurgence of dark creatures called the Unversed in neighboring worlds. During his journey, the vagabond Master Xehanort appeals to Terra to channel the power of darkness freely, creating a schism between him and his friends as they grow troubled by his actions. This eventually leads Terra to clash with Eraqus when he finds his master inexplicably attacking Ventus, which ends with Xehanort vanquishing the weakened Eraqus. After realizing the conflict was engineered to stimulate his inner darkness, Terra confronts Xehanort at the Keyblade Graveyard and succumbs to rage, allowing Xehanort to transplant his heart into his body to prolong his own life. The process that turns Terra into Terra-Xehanort also transfers his disembodied mind into his discarded armor, which becomes the Lingering Will that defeats Xehanort and remains in the Keyblade Graveyard. Following Terra-Xehanort's battle with Aqua, Terra's heart begins resisting Xehanort with the aid of Eraqus's heart, which is revealed to have entered Terra's own before his apparent death, while Xehanort ends up in an amnesiac state by the time Ansem the Wise took him in as an apprentice.

Terra appears in Kingdom Hearts Coded alongside other characters who are bound to Sora's heart. He is also mentioned in the secret ending of the remake Re:coded, where Mickey Mouse and Yen Sid discuss his and Ventus' whereabouts following the events of Birth by Sleep. Terra briefly appears in Kingdom Hearts 3D: Dream Drop Distance, first during Sora's dream where Sora's friends, Riku and Kairi, are transformed into Terra and Aqua; and again when Sora declares his pride in being connected to many Keyblade wielders. A vision of Terra appears in Kingdom Hearts 0.2: Birth by Sleep – A Fragmentary Passage, a part of Kingdom Hearts HD 2.8 Final Chapter Prologue, as Aqua explores the realm of darkness. In Kingdom Hearts III, Terra's restored body appears at the Keyblade Graveyard as one of Xehanort's thirteen "seekers of darkness" in his plan to open Kingdom Hearts, serving again as a vessel for Xehanort's heart from the past. The Lingering Will also appears, being summoned by Naminé after Sora uses the power of waking to undo his allies' initial defeat. During Sora, Aqua, and Ventus's battle against Terra-Xehanort, Terra's heart awakens from within Terra-Xehanort's guardian Heartless, the Dark Figure, which aids Sora in banishing Xehanort's heart and restoring Terra to his true self. After reuniting with Aqua and Ventus, and later aiding in keeping Kingdom Hearts closed, Terra releases Eraqus's heart and spirit, who persuades the dying Xehanort to surrender peacefully. Afterwards, Terra and his friends return home before joining their allies in celebration on the Destiny Islands.

Terra's role in Birth by Sleep is reprised in Tomoko Tanemaki's light novels based on the game. Additionally, the final chapter shows the Lingering Will fighting Sora from Kingdom Hearts II Final Mix.

Terra also appears in Super Smash Bros. Ultimate as a spirit.

=== Ventus ===
Voiced by: Koki Uchiyama (Japanese); Jesse McCartney (English)

Ventus (ヴェントゥス, Ventusu), commonly nicknamed "Ven" (ヴェン), before being introduced in Kingdom Hearts Birth by Sleep, cameoed in the secret endings of Kingdom Hearts II and its re-release, Kingdom Hearts II Final Mix, which depict him and his friends Terra and Aqua battling Master Xehanort and Vanitas. Ventus also makes a cameo appearance in Kingdom Hearts 358/2 Days, when Xion, a replica of Roxas, takes on his appearance while fighting Xigbar. Ventus is also referenced by Xigbar in Kingdom Hearts II and 358/2 Days while Xemnas, the Nobody of Xehanort, searches for him in Castle Oblivion.

Birth by Sleep introduces Ventus as an apprentice of Master Xehanort, who tries to condition him into a dark component of the χ-blade. Due to Ventus's reluctance to use darkness, Xehanort extracts it from his heart and creates Vanitas, damaging his heart in the process. Xehanort brings Ventus to the Destiny Islands, where his heart connects with a newborn Sora to prevent it from collapsing. An amnesiac Ventus is placed under Master Eraqus's care alongside Terra and Aqua, whom he forms a sibling-like bond with. At the beginning of the game, Vanitas provokes Ventus into pursuing Terra during the latter's search for Xehanort, pitting him against dark creatures called the Unversed to strengthen him. Upon meeting Xehanort, Ventus rediscovers his purpose in the χ-blade's creation. Ventus refuses to battle Vanitas and create the weapon, but is forced to do so after Vanitas threatens his friends. They battle within the Keyblade Graveyard, where Vanitas merges with Ventus and obtains the χ-blade. However, the fusion is incomplete, allowing Ventus to destroy both Vanitas and the χ-blade within his heart, but causing him to lose his heart in the process. Aqua reconfigures the Land of Departure into Castle Oblivion to keep Ventus's catatonic body safe, while his wandering heart finds its way back to Sora, who accepts it into his body.

Ventus makes an appearance in Kingdom Hearts Coded, where Mickey Mouse—whom Ventus befriended in the previous game—discovers his heart is connected with Sora's. In Kingdom Hearts 3D: Dream Drop Distance, Sora briefly takes Ventus's form during a dream, and when his heart is wounded, Ventus's armor appears to protect his body. In the game's ending, Ventus is seen smiling in Castle Oblivion, still asleep. An apparition of Ventus appears in the realm of darkness in Kingdom Hearts 0.2: Birth by Sleep – A Fragmentary Passage, a playable episode included in Kingdom Hearts HD 2.8 Final Chapter Prologue. Kingdom Hearts Union χ, which is set many years before Birth by Sleep, reveals Ventus to have been a member of the Dandelions and one of the five Union leaders chosen after the end of the Keyblade War. Along with the other leaders, he forms Union Cross to prevent history from repeating itself. Ventus returns in Kingdom Hearts III after being restored and reunites with Terra, Aqua, and his Dream Eater partner Chirithy.

Ventus also appears in Super Smash Bros. Ultimate as a spirit.

=== Aqua ===
Voiced by: Megumi Toyoguchi (Japanese); Willa Holland (English)

Aqua (アクア, Akua) is a Keyblade Master who serves as one of the three playable characters of Birth by Sleep, and the sole playable character of A Fragmentary Passage, a direct sequel bundled with Kingdom Hearts HD 2.8 Final Chapter Prologue. She is also playable during one fight in Kingdom Hearts III. In gameplay, she is nimble and specializes in magic attacks. As the only one among her friends to achieve the rank of Keyblade Master by the start of the game, Aqua is tasked by Master Eraqus to watch over Terra and retrieve Ventus when he runs away from home. While attempting to protect Ventus and save Terra from Xehanort's control, she becomes trapped in the realm of darkness, where she remains suspended in time throughout the series while fending off the Heartless. In Kingdom Hearts III, Sora rescues her from the realm of darkness, and she joins him in the final battle against Xehanort.

== Recurring original characters ==
=== Xehanort ===
Master Xehanort
Voiced by: Chikao Ōtsuka (BBS, 3D, KHIII), Akio Ōtsuka (KHIII onward) (Japanese); Leonard Nimoy (BBS, 3D), Rutger Hauer (KHIII), Christopher Lloyd (KHIII Re Mind onward) (English)
Terra-Xehanort/Ansem, Seeker of Darkness
Voiced by: Akio Ōtsuka (Japanese); Billy Zane (KH), Richard Epcar (KHII onwards) (English)
Xemnas
Voiced by: Norio Wakamoto (Japanese); Paul St. Peter (English)
Young Xehanort
Voiced by: Takanori Okuda (Japanese); David Gallagher (BBS), Benjamin Diskin (3D onward) (English)

Xehanort (ゼアノート, Zeanōto; English: /ˈzeɪ.ənɔːrt/) is the main antagonist of the Dark Seeker Saga, the first phase in the Kingdom Hearts series. He is initially introduced as the original form of the sentient Heartless Ansem and Nobody Xemnas, but is later established to be an elderly Keyblade Master from Destiny Islands who acquired the means to transplant his heart into the bodies of others, which he uses to orchestrate the events of the games up to Kingdom Hearts III as part of his agenda. Throughout the series, Xehanort is driven by an obsessive interest in the Keyblade War, a historic cataclysm that resulted in the universe's present, fragmented state. In Kingdom Hearts Birth by Sleep, he attempts to use the hearts of his pupils Ventus and Vanitas to forge the χ-blade and unlock Kingdom Hearts to incite another war, desiring to create a new world where light and darkness exist in perfect balance. He also transfers his heart into Terra's body to prolong his own life. However, he is defeated through the combined efforts of Ventus, Terra and Aqua, gaining amnesia in the process. In Kingdom Hearts 3D: Dream Drop Distance, Xehanort returns to his original form following the destruction of Ansem and Xemnas, who are revealed to have been created to reenact his original plan by gathering seven "guardians of light" and thirteen "seekers of darkness" in the form of the Princesses of Heart and Organization XIII, respectively. He also uses time travel to assemble Ansem, Xemnas, and other versions of himself from across time into a new Organization, sending their hearts into replica bodies to co-exist with their present self. In Kingdom Hearts III, where he is defeated and his past selves are eliminated during a showdown against Sora's group, Xehanort surrenders and allows his heart to pass on together with his former friend Eraqus. Kingdom Hearts χ reveals him to be Ephemer's descendant.

=== Naminé ===
Voiced by: Iku Nakahara (Japanese); Brittany Snow (KHII), Meaghan Martin (Re:COM onward) (English)

Naminé (ナミネ, Namine) is first introduced in Chain of Memories, and is revealed in Kingdom Hearts II to be Kairi's Nobody, who was created when Sora released Kairi's heart from within himself during the events of the first game. She has the ability to manipulate the memories of Sora and those close to him, for which she is called a witch. She originates from Castle Oblivion, and is forced by Marluxia to alter Sora's memories so he remembers her as a close friend from Destiny Islands, allowing Marluxia to manipulate him. Axel later lets her escape so she can reveal the truth to Sora, and oversees the year-long process to restore him and his friends' memories to their original state. Naminé also saves Riku in "Reverse/Rebirth" from Zexion, disguising herself as Kairi. In Kingdom Hearts II, Naminé visits Roxas in the virtual Twilight Town to help him discover his true identity as Sora's Nobody. She returns in the game's final world to help Kairi escape from the Organization's dungeon, after which she merges with her. In Kingdom Hearts III, Naminé plays a role in summoning the Lingering Will to help Sora against Terra-Xehanort after being temporarily separated from Kairi's heart. After Xehanort destroys Kairi's body, Naminé's heart is released and transferred to a replica body which Riku had provided to Ansem the Wise and his apprentices, allowing her to exist as a separate person.

=== Organization XIII ===
Organization XIII (XIII機関, Jūsan Kikan) is a group created by Xehanort in his plan to acquire the χ-blade. They are introduced as thirteen Nobodies who seek the power of Kingdom Hearts to become complete humans, with Xehanort's Nobody Xemnas ranked first as their leader. With the exception of Xemnas, who uses Ansem's name, each Organization member's name is an anagram of their original self's name with the letter "X" inserted. While Nobodies initially lack true emotion and morality, they gradually grow hearts over time. Dream Drop Distance reveals that the Organization's true purpose is to serve as vessels for Xehanort's heart in his plan to forge the χ-blade. A second, "real" Organization XIII is assembled from several of the Organization's older members, who willingly return to their Nobody forms, and various incarnations of Xehanort brought from the past using artificial replica bodies. The first Organization's members also serve as computer-controlled party members of 358/2 Days, and are playable in the game's "Mission Mode". Excluding Xemnas, Axel, and Roxas, the initial members and their original names are, in order of rank:

- Xigbar (シグバール, Shigubāru), a marksman who wields two "arrowguns" (rayguns) that can combine to make a sniper rifle and has the power of spatial manipulation. His human identity, Braig (ブライグ, Buraigu), is a guard at Radiant Garden. He is first introduced in Kingdom Hearts II, with his role as one of Xehanort's first followers being expanded upon in subsequent games, revealing him to be an incarnation of the ancient Keyblade wielder Luxu (ルシュ, Rushu), who collaborates with Xehanort to observe his actions. Xigbar and Braig are voiced by Hōchū Ōtsuka in Japanese and James Patrick Stuart in English, while Luxu is voiced by Kenjiro Tsuda in Japanese and Max Mittelman in English.
- Xaldin (ザルディン, Zarudin), an eloquent warrior who has the power to control wind and wields six lances. His human identity is Dilan (ディラン, Diran), a guard at Radiant Garden. He is introduced in Kingdom Hearts II. Xaldin and Dilan are voiced by Yōsuke Akimoto in Japanese and David Dayan Fisher in English.
- Vexen (ヴィクセン, Vikusen), named Even (エヴェン) as a human, a researcher and scientist who conducts various experiments for the Organization; he has the power to control ice and wields a shield. He is introduced in Chain of Memories, and after being restored in Dream Drop Distance, Vexen returns to the Organization as one of Xehanort's "seekers of darkness" in Kingdom Hearts III to sabotage Xehanort's schemes and retrieve his research. Later on, his restored human self resumes his duties as Ansem's apprentice. In Japanese, Vexen and Even are voiced in most appearances by Nachi Nozawa, with Shigeru Chiba voicing them in Kingdom Hearts III following Nozawa's death; in English, they are voiced by Derek Stephen Prince.
- Lexaeus (レクセウス, Rekuseusu), a stalwart warrior who is the Organization's most physically powerful member and has the power to control earth. He wields an "axe sword", a long-bladed axe capable of shattering solid rock. His human identity is Aeleus (エレウス, Ereusu). He is introduced in Chain of Memories. In most appearances, Lexaeus and Aeleus are voiced by Fumihiko Tachiki in Japanese and Dave Boat in English.
- Zexion (ゼクシオン, Zekusion), the youngest of the Organization's founders, can create illusions. He initially appears as a non-combatant in Chain of Memories, with later games revealing his weapon to be a magical book known as a lexicon. In Dream Drop Distance and Kingdom Hearts III, his restored human self, Ienzo (イェンツォ, Yentso), supports Sora's group by helping to reconstruct Roxas. Zexion and Ienzo are voiced by Akira Ishida in Japanese and Vince Corazza in English.
- Saïx (サイクス, Saikusu), Xemnas' right-hand man and Axel's friend from Radiant Garden, named Isa (アイザ, Aiza) as a human. He draws power from the heart-shaped moon of Kingdom Hearts to assume a berserk state and transform his weapon, a claymore. He is introduced in Kingdom Hearts II, and later appears in Dream Drop Distance as one of Xehanort's thirteen "seekers of darkness" from the original Organization. However, he secretly works against the Organization to help restore Roxas before reconciling with Lea in Kingdom Hearts III. He is voiced by Ginpei Sato in Japanese and Kirk Thornton in English.
- Demyx (デミックス, Demikkusu), a laidback member who controls water with his sitar music. He is introduced in Kingdom Hearts II and also appears in Kingdom Hearts III as a reserve "seeker of darkness" for his past as an ancient Keyblade wielder. However, he is convinced to help Vexen act against the Organization. Demyx is voiced by Kenichi Suzumura in Japanese and Ryan O'Donohue in English.
- Luxord (ルクソード, Rukusōdo), a courteous gambler who has the power to control time and wields a deck of cards. He is introduced in Kingdom Hearts II. He later appears in Kingdom Hearts III as one of Xehanort's seekers of darkness, recruited for his past as an ancient Keyblade wielder. Luxord is voiced by Jouji Nakata in Japanese and Robin Atkin Downes in English.
- Marluxia (マールーシャ, Mārūsha), who wields a scythe and attacks with flower-based attacks. As the main antagonist of Chain of Memories, he presides over Castle Oblivion and harbors intentions of overthrowing the group using Sora and Naminé's powers. Despite his betrayal, he appears in Kingdom Hearts III as one of Xehanort's chosen "seekers of darkness" for his past as an ancient Keyblade wielder named Lauriam (ラーリアム, Rāriamu). In most appearances, he is voiced by Shūichi Ikeda in Japanese and Keith Ferguson in English.
- Larxene (ラクシーヌ, Rakushīn), a female member and co-conspirator of Marluxia is introduced in Chain of Memories. She has electricity-based powers and wields a set of knives. She appears in Kingdom Hearts III as one of Xehanort's chosen "seekers of darkness" for her past as an ancient Keyblade wielder named Elrena (エルレナ, Erurena). In most appearances, Larxene is voiced by Yūko Miyamura in Japanese and Shanelle Workman in English.

=== Riku Replica ===
Voiced by: Mamoru Miyano (Japanese); David Gallagher (English)

Riku Replica (リク=レプリカ, Riku-Repurika) is a replica of Riku created by Vexen from his combat data, who first appears as an antagonist in Chain of Memories. He initially appears to be Riku under the influence of darkness, but his true nature is revealed after he battles Sora to protect Naminé, who altered his memories so that he believed himself to be real as part of Marluxia's plan to manipulate Sora. The game's "Reverse/Rebirth" story mode depicts Riku's confrontations with his replica, who is eventually destroyed in a fight meant to prove his right to exist after discovering his origins. In Kingdom Hearts III, Riku finds the replica's heart in the realm of darkness and gives it refuge within his own heart. A past version of the replica called "Dark Riku" also appears in the game as a member of the real Organization XIII, masquerading as Riku's younger self. After Dark Riku is defeated, Riku Replica sacrifices himself to extract Dark Riku's heart from its vessel, which he provides for Naminé.

=== Ansem the Wise ===
Voiced by: Genzō Wakayama (Japanese); Christopher Lee (KHII, Days), Corey Burton (other appearances) (English)

Ansem the Wise (賢者アンセム, Kenja Ansemu) is the former sage king of Radiant Garden, who first appears in the "Reverse/Rebirth" storyline of Chain of Memories as a bandaged figure known as DiZ (ディズ, Dizu). His true identity is revealed in Kingdom Hearts II, which also reveals the similarly named antagonist to be an impostor. Nine years prior to the first game's events, Ansem studied the darkness in people's hearts for the benefit of his world after taking in an amnesic Terra-Xehanort. After meeting with King Mickey and learning his research may be connected to a crisis happening in other worlds, Ansem ceased his experiments. However, Xehanort secretly continued the experiments under Ansem's name alongside Ansem's other pupils—Braig, Dilan, Even, Aeleus, and Ienzo—who exiled Ansem to a world of nothingness and formed Organization XIII. Ansem disguised himself as DiZ, an acronym for "Darkness in Zero", and escaped to exact revenge on the Organization.

In Chain of Memories, DiZ guides Riku through Castle Oblivion under the guise of Xehanort's Heartless. Along with Riku and Naminé, DiZ oversees the restoration of Sora, Donald, and Goofy's memories throughout 358/2 Days, moving them from Castle Oblivion to Twilight Town for safekeeping. When Roxas unwittingly begins absorbing Sora's memories, DiZ orders Riku to retrieve Roxas, whom he places inside a simulation of Twilight Town to eventually merge with Sora. In Kingdom Hearts II, DiZ's plans fall apart when Sora does not function as he wants upon awakening. Upon realizing the harm he brought to Sora and his friends, DiZ becomes remorseful and abandons his desire for revenge. Ansem later reveals himself to Mickey at the World That Never Was while attempting to digitally encode Xemnas' Kingdom Hearts within a machine. The hearts overload the machine and cause it to self-destruct, with Ansem allowing himself to be engulfed by the blast to atone for his mistakes.

Birth by Sleep's epilogue reveals Ansem to be alive in the realm of darkness, where he relays his intact memories of Sora to Aqua. In Dream Drop Distance, a digital copy of Ansem appears within Sora's heart to present Riku with research data he has hidden regarding Roxas, Xion, and Ventus's hearts. During the events of Kingdom Hearts III, Ansem is brought back to the realm of light by Xehanort's Heartless to locate one of his former test subjects for the Organization before being rescued by Vexen's intervention. Following Xehanort's defeat, Ansem resumes his role as ruler of Radiant Garden.

=== Vanitas ===
Voiced by: Miyu Irino (Japanese); Haley Joel Osment (English)

Vanitas (ヴァニタス, Vanitasu) is a Keyblade wielder and antagonist who first appears in Birth by Sleep, created by Master Xehanort from darkness extracted from Ventus's heart as part of his plan to forge the χ-blade. Vanitas was initially faceless at the time of his creation until Ventus connected his heart to the newborn Sora. This made Vanitas closely resemble Sora, albeit with black hair and yellow eyes. He considers Sora as a "brother" like Ventus since their connection defined him as a person. Though he aids in Xehanort's scheme, Vanitas acts on his own whims to lure Ventus away from home to strengthen him into his equal to commence their reunion. He also attacks him and his friends with the Unversed manifested from Vanitas's negative emotions. While Vanitas succeeds in merging into Ventus during their final confrontation at the Keyblade Graveyard, their reunion produces an unstable χ-blade, which is destroyed along with Vanitas in a metaphysical battle against Ventus within their combined heart. However, he briefly appears alongside Young Xehanort in Dream Drop Distance in reaction to the presence of Ventus's heart within Sora's. In Kingdom Hearts III, Vanitas is inducted into the real Organization XIII as one of the thirteen seekers of darkness, using a replica body with the intention of reclaiming Ventus's heart. Vanitas returns to his original time upon being defeated for a second time.

While developing Birth by Sleep, Nomura created Vanitas's relationship with Ventus under suggestion from the game's Osaka development team, as he enjoyed the idea of adding more connections between characters. He chose the name "Vanitas"—Latin for "emptiness"—for its similarity to Ventus's name, and because its Japanese translation, kara (空), could be reinterpreted as Sora's name, which means "sky". A secret boss based on Vanitas called the Vanitas Remnant (ヴァニタスの思念, Vanitasu no Shinen) appears in Birth by Sleep.

=== Eraqus ===
Voiced by: Makio Inoue (Japanese); Mark Hamill (English)
Young Eraqus
Voiced by: Daisuke Namikawa (Japanese); Drake Bell (English)

Eraqus (エラクゥス, Erakwusu) is introduced in Birth by Sleep as one of the few remaining Keyblade Masters alongside Xehanort, and is later revealed to be descended from the Keyblade users that survived the Keyblade War. He is in charge of the Land of Departure and is both a mentor and father figure to Terra, Aqua and Ventus. He is also noted for being biased against the existence of darkness in favor of light, a key factor behind his eventual falling out with Xehanort. Nomura described his relationship with Xehanort as that of old friends and classmates.

At the start of Birth by Sleep, Eraqus passes Aqua the Mark of Mastery but denies Terra, basing his decision on the darkness in his heart. He sends Terra and Aqua to deal with the appearance of the Unversed and the disappearance of Master Xehanort and Aqua to retrieve Ventus, fearing that Xehanort will use Ventus to create the χ-blade. When Ventus confronts him over this and confirms his fears, Eraqus attempts to destroy Ventus to foil Xehanort's plan, but is stopped by Terra. After battling with his student, he is struck down by Xehanort and fades away, leaving his Keyblade behind. However, the game's secret ending reveals that Eraqus had hidden his heart within Terra, allowing Terra to resist Xehanort's influence after being possessed by him. Eraqus returns in Kingdom Hearts III, emerging from Terra's restored body and persuading Xehanort to surrender, after which their hearts ascend to the afterlife. Dark Road explores Eraqus's childhood and his friendship with Xehanort leading up to the events of Birth by Sleep.

Eraqus' name is an anagram of "Square", referencing series developer company Square Enix, and acting as a parallel to Yen Sid's name being Disney in reverse. He also resembles Final Fantasy series creator Hironobu Sakaguchi. An boss modeled after Eraqus' armor, called the Armor of Eraqus (アーマー・オブ・ザ・マスター, Āmā obu za Masutā; lit. "Armor of the Master"), appears in Birth by Sleep Final Mix as an opponent in the Mirage Arena.

=== Foretellers ===
The Foretellers (予知者, Yochisha) are a group of Keyblade Masters trained under the Master of Masters, each a leader of one of the five Unions established to gather light and combat darkness. They first appear in Kingdom Hearts χ, where they are each given a copy of the Book of Prophecies, which details their master's prediction of the future and the manifestation of worlds. After the Master disappears, the Foretellers' paranoia of a traitor among themselves results in infighting that eventually leads to the Keyblade War and the destruction of the world. With the exception of Ava, the Foretellers appear in the epilogue of Kingdom Hearts III, where they are summoned by Luxu and informed of the events that occurred in their absence.

- Ira (イラ; English: /ˈiːrə/) is the "reliable" leader of the Unicornis Union, who is symbolized by a unicorn. Prior to disappearing, the Master of Masters assigns Ira to lead the other Foretellers in his place. He is voiced by Yūichirō Umehara in Japanese and Matthew Mercer in English.
- Invi (インヴィ) is the "virtuous" leader of the Anguis Union, who is symbolized by a snake. She acts as the Foretellers' moderator while observing them and reporting her findings to Ira. She is voiced by Kana Hanazawa in Japanese and Karissa Lee Staples in English.
- Aced (アセッド, Aseddo) is the "fearless" leader of the Ursus Union, who is symbolized by a bear. As Ira's second-in-command, Aced comes to doubt Ira's leadership and acts of his own accord to prevent the Keyblade War. He is voiced by Subaru Kimura in Japanese and Travis Willingham in English.
- Ava (アヴァ; English: /ˈɑːvə/) is the "prudent" leader of the Vulpes Union, who is symbolized by a fox. Under her master's orders, she secretly recruits Keyblade wielders from various Unions to establish the Dandelions, a group sent to another world to ensure their survival after the Keyblade War. After sending the Dandelions off when the Keyblade War draws near, Ava ends up causing the event when she confronts Luxu over the truth behind the Lost Page. She is voiced by Yume Miyamoto in Japanese and Isabela Merced in English.
- Gula (グウラ, Gūra) is the "coolheaded" leader of the Leopardus Union, who is symbolized by a leopard. He is a lone wolf with little attachment to the other Foretellers, and is assigned to identify the traitor among the group. He is voiced by Kaito Ishikawa in Japanese and Kevin Quinn in English.

=== Dandelions ===
The Dandelions (ダンデライオン, Danderaion) are a group of Keyblade wielders recruited by Ava, each deemed strong enough to resist the darkness. They are sent to another world before the Keyblade War to prevent being caught in the battle and to help rebuild the world in its aftermath. In the new world, five of the Dandelions, including Ventus and Lauriam, are chosen to retain their memories of the Keyblade War and become the new Union leaders, forming the joint group Union Cross to ensure the event would never repeat itself. The other Dandelions, like Elrena, had their memories rewritten to forget the events leading to the Keyblade War. When the digital Daybreak Town is about to be destroyed, the five leaders and Elrena escape and are sent to the future, appearing in different times, while the remaining Dandelions' hearts merge with their Chirithies, becoming Dream Eaters.

- Ephemer (エフェメラ, Efemera) is a Keyblade wielder from a different Union than the player, whose allegiance depends on their chosen Union. After being chosen as a Dandelion, Ephemer is sent away from the Keyblade War as one of the Foretellers' successors. He becomes the leader of Union Cross and guides the group's decision-making. After the digital Daybreak Town is destroyed, he emerges in the real Daybreak Town's ruins and builds Scala Ad Caelum upon them. Dark Road reveals him to have been Xehanort's ancestor. He later appears in Kingdom Hearts III to help Sora in spirit. He is voiced by Yūto Uemura in Japanese and Michael Johnston in English.
- Skuld (スクルド, Sukurudo) is a girl from the same Union as Ephemer, her first friend from the Union. She joins the player in investigating Ephemer's whereabouts following his disappearance, eventually becoming one of the leaders of Union Cross. After the digital Daybreak Town is destroyed, her whereabouts are unknown.
- Brain (ブレイン, Burein) is a Keyblade wielder selected to serve as one of the leaders in Union Cross. Having obtained the Book of Prophecies from Ava as part of the Master of Masters' design, Brain believes the new world is destined to fall and begins working to change the future. After the digital Daybreak Town is destroyed, he awakens in the future in Scala Ad Caelum.
- Strelitzia (ストレリチア, Sutorerichia) is a Keyblade wielder selected to serve as one of the new Union leaders. She is Lauriam's younger sister and a comrade of Elrena. Before she is able to convince the player to join the Dandelions, she is attacked by the Darkness-possessed Ventus, who takes her place as she fades from existence. Strelitzia is set to return in Kingdom Hearts IV.
- "Player" (プレイヤー, Pureiyā) is the main character of χ and Union χ, whose name, sex, and appearance are chosen by the player. A Keyblade wielder from Daybreak Town who is chosen to join one of the Unions prior to the Keyblade War to compete for Lux. After the player's self sacrifice to ensure friends' safety and trap four True Darknesses within the data Daybreak Town, the player chooses to join hearts with another person. This new host eventually raises Xehanort before dying.

=== Yozora ===
Voiced by: Tasuku Hatanaka (Japanese); Dylan Sprouse (English)

Yozora (ヨゾラ) is a character who appears in Kingdom Hearts III in the "Toy Box" world, which is based on Toy Story, as the lead of the in-series video game Verum Rex. He later appears physically in the game's secret ending, and encounters Sora within the Final World in Kingdom Hearts III Re Mind as the boss of its Secret Episode. In 2022, Nomura stated that he had had plans to create a Verum Rex game to develop Yozora, but the idea was scrapped in favor of Kingdom Hearts IV, as he was worried about his popularity.

=== Other characters ===
- Hayner (ハイネ, Haine), Pence (ピンツ, Pintsu), and Olette (オレット, Oretto) are three teenagers who live in Twilight Town. Virtual replicas of the three serve as Roxas' friends in DiZ's simulation of Twilight Town at the start of Kingdom Hearts II, while their real counterparts help Sora infiltrate Organization XIII's stronghold through the digital town. They also briefly encounter Roxas during 358/2 Days. In Kingdom Hearts II, the three are respectively voiced by Kazunori Sasaki, Hayato Taya, and Yuka Hirasawa in Japanese, and by Justin Cowden, Sean Marquette, and Jessica DiCicco in English. In Kingdom Hearts III, Sasaki and Hirasawa are replaced by Makoto Sutō and Yuna Watanabe in Japanese, while they are voiced in English by Zachary Gordon, Tristan Chase, and Ashley Boettcher respectively.
- Chirithy (チリシィ, Chirishii) is a cat-like species of Dream Eater created by the Master of Masters, with each Keyblade wielder receiving one to aid in their endeavors. Due to an empathic link to their Keyblade wielders, a Chirithy transforms into a Nightmare if their user is tainted by darkness, with the appearance of one starting the chain of events leading to the Keyblade War. After the digital Daybreak Town is destroyed, the Chirithies merge with their Keyblade wielders' hearts to protect them, becoming new Dream Eaters. Ventus's Chirithy appears in Kingdom Hearts III, guiding Sora in the Final World before reuniting with Ventus. Chirithy is voiced by Tomoko Kaneda in Japanese and Lara Jill Miller in English.
- The Master of Masters (マスター・オブ・マスター, Masutā obu Masutā) is the mentor to Luxu and the Foretellers, who vanishes before the events of Kingdom Hearts χ. He possesses an eye with prophetic vision that allows him to transcribe the Book of Prophecies, embedding it within the "No Name" Keyblade and passing it down to maintain his future sight until it is acquired by Xehanort at the beginning of the series' storyline. In Back Cover, he is shown to have a playful and mischievous personality that conceals his true nature. The Master of Masters is voiced by Tomokazu Sugita in Japanese and Ray Chase in English.
- Master Odin (ウォーデン, Wōden) is a senior Keyblade Master and mentor to Xehanort and Eraqus at Scala ad Caelum, who appears in Kingdom Hearts Dark Road. After seven upperclassmen disappear, he sends his new students to search the worlds for them. After most of his students are killed by Baldr, Odin decides to retire and make Eraqus his successor.
- Vor (ヴェル, Veru), Urd (ウルド, Urudo), Hermod (ヘルモーズ, Herumōzu), and Bragi (ブラギ, Buragi) are Xehanort's and Eraqus's fellow Keyblade wielders-in-training under Master Odin, who appear in Dark Road. They are set on a mission to discover the whereabouts of their vanished colleagues. Vor, Urd, and Hermod are eventually killed by fellow wielder Baldr, while Bragi, who is secretly Luxu, fakes his death and escapes.
- Baldr (バルドル, Barudoru) is a Keyblade wielder who lives and trains in Scala ad Caelum. He appears in Dark Road. After his sister Hoder is killed protecting him, his grief and guilt cause him to be overtaken by darkness, and he kills several other students and nearly summons Kingdom Hearts before being defeated by Xehanort.
- Vidar (ヴィーザス, Vīzasu), Vala (ヴォルヴァ, Voruva), Vali (ヴァーリ, Vāri), Hoder (ヘイズ, Heizu), Heimdall (ヘイムダル, Heimudaru), Helgi (ヘルギ, Herugi), and Sigrun (シグルーン, Shigurūn) are high-leveled Keyblade Wielders and Master Odin's seven upperclassmen, who have mysteriously vanished. After Hoder, Heimdall, Helgi, and Sigrun are killed through the manipulations of an incarnation of True Darkness, the remaining three seek to summon Kingdom Hearts to avenge their deceased friends, not realizing it is part of the Darkness's plans. The last of the upperclassmen are killed by the Darkness-possessed Baldr during the final confrontation at Scala ad Caelum, but Hoder's ghost briefly returns to help Eraqus and Xehanort defeat Baldr.
- Subject X (被験者X, Hikensha X) is the designation given to a mysterious girl mentioned by Ansem, Seeker of Darkness and Ansem the Wise in Kingdom Hearts III. Her whereabouts and true identity are currently unknown.
- The Nameless Star (ネームレス・スター, Nēmuresu Sutā) is the spirit of a mysterious girl lingering within the Final World. While her identity is unknown, she has been stated to be a form of another character who has previously appeared in the series. She originally came from Quadratum, a world from "the other side". The Nameless Star is voiced by Risa Shimizu in Japanese and Madison Davenport in English.
- Darkness (闇, Yami) is an embodiment of True Darkness from which all other darkness spawns; it exists in thirteen separate incarnations. In the aftermath of Union χ, seven are sealed within the Master of Masters and his six apprentices, four are trapped within the data Daybreak Town, and one is sealed inside Ventus, later being released as Vanitas. The identity of the last incarnation is unknown.
- Sigurd (シグルド, Shigurudo) is an inhabitant of Scala ad Caelum, whom Brain meets at the end of Kingdom Hearts Union χ.

== Disney and Square Enix characters ==
=== Mickey Mouse ===
Voiced by: Takashi Aoyagi (KH–III), Takanori Hoshino (III onward) (Japanese); Wayne Allwine (KH–Days), Bret Iwan (BBS onward) (English)

Mickey Mouse is depicted in the Kingdom Hearts series as the king of Disney Castle, and is frequently referred to in-game as "King Mickey" or simply "the King" (王様, Ōsama). He is also an experienced Keyblade Master, alternatively wielding a golden version of Sora's "Kingdom Key" retrieved from the realm of darkness, and the "Star Seeker" he is seen using during his apprenticeship to Yen Sid in Birth by Sleep. Mickey is absent for most of the original game, as he departs from his world to find a solution to the Heartless invasion, leaving behind instructions for Donald and Goofy telling them to find and protect the Keyblade wielder. He has a more active role fighting alongside Sora and his allies in later installments, which first required the approval of Disney. He is a playable character in Kingdom Hearts II, stepping in to replace Sora whenever the player is defeated during certain boss battles until he is able to revive Sora. He is also available for play in the "Mission Mode" of Kingdom Hearts 358/2 Days as an unlockable character.

=== Donald Duck and Goofy ===
Donald Duck
Voiced by: Kōichi Yamadera (Japanese); Tony Anselmo (English)
Goofy
Voiced by: Yuu Shimaka (KH–MOM), Takahiro Miyamoto (present) (Japanese); Bill Farmer (English)

In various games, Donald Duck and Goofy serve as the player's main computer-controlled partners. They are depicted as members of Disney Castle's royal court; Donald is a magician proficient with various offensive and supportive spells, and Goofy is a peaceful knights' captain who wields a shield and can perform supportive and defensive techniques using it. In Kingdom Hearts, Donald and Goofy embark on a journey to find their missing king, with orders from a letter left by Mickey to find the Keyblade wielder. They accompany Sora for this reason, initially viewing him as little more than a means to track down the king, and reluctantly abandoning him after learning that Riku is the rightful owner of Sora's Keyblade. However, both eventually grow to care for Sora as a friend and remain with him. Donald and Goofy also appear as unlockable playable characters in 358/2 Days's "Mission Mode".

=== Maleficent ===
Voiced by: Toshiko Sawada (Japanese); Susanne Blakeslee (English)

Maleficent, an evil fairy and the main antagonist of the 1959 film Sleeping Beauty, appears as the secondary antagonist in the Kingdom Hearts series. During the first game, she leads a group of other Disney villains—Hades from Hercules, Jafar from Aladdin, Ursula from The Little Mermaid, Oogie Boogie from The Nightmare Before Christmas, and Captain Hook from Peter Pan—to capture the Princesses of Heart and harness the power of Kingdom Hearts, which she intends to use to conquer all worlds. In reality, she is an unwitting pawn of Xehanort, who first informs her of the princesses during the prequel Birth by Sleep as part of his plan to gather components for the χ-blade. Her defeat results in her becoming trapped in the realm of darkness, but she returns after her raven forces Flora, Fauna, and Merryweather to recall their memories of her, allowing her to resume her conquest of worlds. Following Maleficent's attempts to acquire a new lair after losing Hollow Bastion, she and Pete search for the Master of Master's Black Box throughout most of Kingdom Hearts III before witnessing Luxu summoning the Foretellers.

=== Pete ===
Voiced by: Tōru Ōhira (KHII–HD 2.5), Katsuhiro Kitagawa (KHIII) (Japanese); Jim Cummings (English)

Pete is included in Kingdom Hearts II as Maleficent's bumbling henchman, who first encounters Sora's group while amassing a Heartless army for her, unaware of her earlier defeat. He was originally a steamboat captain based on his depiction in Steamboat Willie, but is banished to another dimension by Queen Minnie for incessantly causing mischief around Disney Town under the masked superhero guises "Captain Justice" and "Captain Dark", as seen in Birth by Sleep. He becomes indebted to Maleficent after she frees him, and vows to help her conquer the worlds in return. He makes recurring appearances throughout Kingdom Hearts II and later installments, menacing Sora's group alongside Maleficent and other Disney villains. A version of Pete based on his depiction in Mickey, Donald, Goofy: The Three Musketeers appears in the "Country of the Musketeers" world in Dream Drop Distance.

=== Yen Sid ===
Voiced by: Takashi Inagaki (Japanese); Corey Burton (English)

Yen Sid is the sorcerer from "The Sorcerer's Apprentice" segment of Fantasia, who appears in the series as King Mickey's old mentor and a retired Keyblade Master who resides in the Mysterious Tower. He first appears in Kingdom Hearts II, where he informs Sora's group of their task at hand on Mickey's behalf. In addition to providing counsel to the main characters of Birth by Sleep, he oversees Sora and Riku's Mark of Mastery exam in Dream Drop Distance to prepare them for the showdown with Master Xehanort and trains Kairi and Lea to serve as two of the potential seven "guardians of light".

=== Princesses of Heart ===
The Princesses of Heart, known as the Seven Princesses (セブンプリンセス, Sebun Purinsesu) in Japanese, are maidens whose hearts are made of pure light and devoid of darkness, with Kairi being one of them. The other Princesses include Disney characters Snow White, Cinderella, Alice, Aurora, Belle, and Jasmine. Kingdom Hearts III introduces new inheritors of the original Princesses' powers called the New Seven Hearts (ニューセブンハート, Nyū Sebun Hāto)—including Rapunzel, Anna, and Elsa—with only Kairi retaining her original role.

Throughout the original game, Maleficent kidnaps the princesses for their ability to summon the Keyhole to Kingdom Hearts when brought together. Xehanort's Heartless "Ansem" later uses six of the princesses' hearts to forge a Keyblade with the power to unlock people's hearts, intending to free Kairi's heart from Sora's. Sora restores their hearts after using Ansem's Keyblade on himself to revive Kairi, destroying it. The other princesses remain at Hollow Bastion to contain the darkness coming from the Keyhole until the door to Kingdom Hearts is sealed and subsequently return to their homeworlds. Birth by Sleep reveals that Master Xehanort also seeks the Princesses of Heart, spurring Maleficent into gathering them; it is later explained in Dream Drop Distance that the princesses' hearts represent the seven fragments of light broken off from the χ-blade, which Xehanort intends to use in his plan to reforge the weapon. To prevent this, Yen Sid substitutes the princesses with seven Keyblade wielders to fight Xehanort's reformed Organization XIII.

=== Party members and summons ===
Several games in the Kingdom Hearts series feature computer-controlled characters that join the player's party in a specific world. The first game features six different party members in addition to Donald and Goofy: Tarzan in Deep Jungle; Aladdin in Agrabah; Ariel in Atlantica; Jack Skellington in Halloween Town; Peter Pan in Never Land; and Beast in Hollow Bastion. In addition, six characters can be acquired as summoned allies: adult Simba, Genie, Dumbo, Bambi, Tinker Bell, and Mushu. Chain of Memories features the same party and summoned characters from the first game, with the inclusion of Cloud Strife as an additional summon.

Aladdin, Jack Skellington, and the Beast return as party members in Kingdom Hearts II, with Ariel appearing in a non-playable capacity, and Peter Pan appearing as a summon along with Tinker Bell. Adult Simba is featured as a party member in the Pride Lands, while Mushu becomes a supporting ally along with new party member Mulan in the Land of Dragons. Other new party members include Auron in Olympus Coliseum, Jack Sparrow in Port Royal, and Tron in Space Paranoids. Chicken Little and Stitch are also included as new summons.

Birth by Sleep removes the standard party system utilized by previous games, instead using characters as temporary partners during certain portions of the game. These characters are Prince Phillip in Enchanted Dominion; Hercules and Zack Fair in Olympus Coliseum, with the latter being based on his appearance in Final Fantasy VII: Crisis Core; and Stitch, who is named "Experiment 626", in Deep Space.

Hercules and Jack Sparrow return as party members in Kingdom Hearts III, with new party members including Woody and Buzz Lightyear in Toy Box, Rapunzel and Flynn Rider in the Kingdom of Corona, James P. Sullivan and Mike Wazowski in Monstropolis, Marshmallow in Arendelle, and Baymax in San Fransokyo. Wreck-It Ralph, Simba, Ariel, and Stitch also appear as summonable "Link" characters alongside the "Meow Wow" Dream Eater from Dream Drop Distance.

=== Guest Disney characters ===
A common element in the Kingdom Hearts series is the inclusion of levels based on various Disney and Pixar films, as well as related media. Several key characters from the films appear in their respective worlds, closely following their roles from the film and playing a small role in the main story.

Several characters from the Mickey Mouse and Donald Duck universes appear in the Kingdom Hearts series, most of them appearing at Disney Castle and its adjacent urban area, Disney Town. Minnie Mouse is depicted as the queen of Disney Castle who rules in the absence of her husband, King Mickey; to date, this is the only continuity in which Mickey and Minnie are married. Daisy Duck, Donald Duck's girlfriend, is Minnie's lady-in-waiting. Pluto reprises his role as Mickey's pet and makes recurring appearances throughout the series, accompanying Donald and Goofy's search for the king in the first game. Chip 'n' Dale act as Disney Castle's technicians, managing the Gummi Ship that Sora's party uses to travel between worlds; they play a major role in Coded, where they construct the machine used to digitize the contents of Jiminy Cricket's journal. Donald's nephews Huey, Dewey, and Louie appear as shop owners in Kingdom Hearts, Kingdom Hearts II, and Kingdom Hearts III, where they attempt to save up money to go on their own adventures. Scrooge McDuck appears in Kingdom Hearts II, Birth by Sleep, and Kingdom Hearts III, where he attempts to open business venues, such as a transit system between worlds, an ice cream business, and a restaurant in Twilight Town. The Beagle Boys, as depicted in Mickey, Donald, Goofy: The Three Musketeers, reprise their roles from the film as Pete's minions in the Dream Drop Distance world "Country of the Musketeers". Other characters, such as Horace Horsecollar, Clarabelle Cow, and Clara Cluck, make minor appearances in Kingdom Hearts II and Birth by Sleep. Ludwig Von Drake does not appear physically, but is mentioned on the Classic Kingdom posters found in Twilight Town in Kingdom Hearts III.

Characters from other Disney films also play prominent roles in the games' story. Jiminy Cricket appears as a chronicler of Sora's travels, recording information about the people, places and events they encounter in his journals; he also retains his role from Pinocchio as the titular character's conscience. Merlin from The Sword in the Stone acts as Sora's mentor in performing magic and keeps an enchanted book that allows players access to the Hundred Acre Wood where Winnie the Pooh and his friends came be found. The Fairy Godmother from Cinderella appears in Merlin's house in Kingdom Hearts, where she transforms "summon gems" collected throughout the game into summoned allies; she also appears in Birth by Sleep as a resident of her original world, the Castle of Dreams. The One Hundred and One Dalmatians are featured in a side-quest in the first game, where players must retrieve them after they were scattered throughout the game's worlds in exchange for prizes. Flora, Fauna, and Merryweather from Sleeping Beauty appear in Kingdom Hearts II, where they provide Sora with new clothes that grant him access to Drive Forms. Kingdom Hearts III includes Remy from Pixar's Ratatouille as the chef of Scrooge McDuck's bistro in Twilight Town, where he hosts a cooking minigame.

=== Guest Square Enix characters ===
Kingdom Hearts features characters from other Square Enix-developed titles, most prominently Final Fantasy. Most games include Moogles, who are a recurring element throughout the Final Fantasy series; they serve to run shops where players can create and purchase items used in the game.

Kingdom Hearts prominently depicts several Final Fantasy characters as residents of the world Radiant Garden, which was known as Hollow Bastion prior to Kingdom Hearts II. Led by Squall Leonhart from Final Fantasy VIII, who goes by the name "Leon" (レオン, Reon) out of shame for his inability to save his home, the group also includes Final Fantasy VII characters Aerith Gainsborough, Yuffie Kisaragi, and Cid Highwind, who is an expert in the games' "Gummi Ship" feature. These characters form the "Hollow Bastion Restoration Committee" in Kingdom Hearts II to rebuild their destroyed world following Maleficent's defeat, using Merlin's house as a base. In both games, Leon and Yuffie are featured as opponents in the Olympus Coliseum. The Restoration Committee and its members return in Kingdom Hearts III Re Mind, helping Riku search for clues regarding Sora's disappearance.

Youthful versions of Final Fantasy X characters Tidus and Wakka, as well as Final Fantasy VIII character Selphie Tilmitt, make recurring appearances as residents of the Destiny Islands and serve as optional sparring partners early on in the first game.

Cloud Strife appears in Kingdom Hearts at Olympus Coliseum, in which he is a mercenary hired by Hades to kill Hercules in exchange for the whereabouts of Sephiroth, who is an optional boss in the North American, PAL, and Final Mix releases of the game. Cloud and Tifa Lockhart later appear in Kingdom Hearts II as allies of the Hollow Bastion Restoration Committee; Sephiroth also returns as an optional boss, and is depicted as the embodiment of Cloud's darkness.

Younger incarnations of Final Fantasy VIII characters Seifer Almasy and Fujin and Raijin, who are known as "Fuu" and "Rai", appear in Kingdom Hearts II as members of Twilight Town's self-proclaimed disciplinary committee. Twilight Town also features Final Fantasy IX's Vivi Ornitier as an admirer of Final Fantasy VI's Setzer Gabbiani, who is a champion of the local Struggle sport. Neither character was designed by Nomura, who included them under pressure from his staff.

The Gullwings from Final Fantasy X-2—Yuna, Rikku and Paine—are depicted as fairy-like creatures in Kingdom Hearts II, where they are initially sent by Maleficent to spy on the Hollow Bastion Restoration Committee, but later switch sides to help Sora's group in exchange for treasure.

Zack Fair from Final Fantasy VII appears in Kingdom Hearts Birth by Sleep in Olympus Coliseum, where he is also a party member.

Kefka Palazzo and the Warring Triad from Final Fantasy VI appear as a Heartless boss named "Mysterious Sir" in Kingdom Hearts Union χ. Final Fantasy summons Shiva, Ramuh, Ifrit and Leviathan also appear as Heartless bosses in the game.

The main characters of The World Ends with You—Neku Sakuraba, Yoshiya "Joshua" Kiryu, Shiki Misaki, Daisukenojo "Beat" Bito, and Raimu "Rhyme" Bito—appear in Dream Drop Distance as players of a Reapers' Game in Traverse Town. They are depicted as figments of their original selves who Joshua saved from fading out of existence following Shibuya's destruction.

The SS-01 SchwarzGheist from Einhänder appears as a Gummi Heartless boss in Kingdom Hearts III under the name "SchwarzGheist".

== Merchandise ==
Kingdom Hearts character figurines; a Play Arts figure of Roxas appears in the center and Formation Arts Volume 1 & 2 figures are arrayed around him.

The characters of the Kingdom Hearts series have had various types of merchandise modeled after their likeness. Square Enix has released a collection of Formation Arts figurines that feature several of the main characters from the first game. A series of Play Arts action figures has also been released. Other merchandise includes jewelry and key chains modeled after character apparel and accessories. The characters are also featured on posters, desktop wallpapers, and trading cards that are part of the Kingdom Hearts Trading Card Game.

== Reception ==
Overall, the characters within the Kingdom Hearts series have been well received and have garnered praise for the quality of their voice acting as well as their visual style. IGN, GameSpy, and Game Informer all praised the animation quality of the characters. IGN's David Smith's impressions of the characters were very positive, referring to them as an "engaging cast", and stating the "characters' acting is helped immensely by the facial expressions and body". The design of the characters created specifically for Kingdom Hearts was seen as the highlight of the first game, stating "the majority of its best visual moments are based on original designs". One complaint he expressed was "the odd bit of cheating with the lip-synching, where textured facial features are substituted for full 3D animation". GameSpy stated the Disney characters "slide perfectly into Square's visual style", and complemented the realistic characters from Pirates of the Caribbean, describing them as "remarkably accurate".

GameSpot commented the first game created a "fascinating world" using the Disney and Final Fantasy characters. GameSpy stated the inclusion of the Disney and Square Enix characters was handled well. The main character Sora has also received press comments. In January 2007, Sora was listed the 4th biggest dork of 2006 by Game Informer, citing the Atlantica singing portions of the game. IGN listed him as a possible character in Super Smash Bros. Brawl; though he was not chosen as the "reader's choice".

GameSpy praised the voice cast and voice acting in the first and third games. G4TV awarded Kingdom Hearts II "Best Voice Over" in their 2006 G-phoria Awards. Game Informer praised the voice acting of the third game, particularly the performances by Haley Joel Osment, Christopher Lee, and James Woods. They also stated the voice talent "shines across the board." Reception towards the voice acting in Kingdom Hearts Birth by Sleep, however, was decidedly mixed, with praise aimed at the performances of Jesse McCartney, Mark Hamill and Leonard Nimoy, while Willa Holland and Jason Dohring's performances received a more mixed reaction, with GameSpot referring to Dohring's performance as "abysmal".
