= Aqua (Kingdom Hearts) =

Kingdom Hearts character

- Kingdom Hearts character
- Aqua as seen in Kingdom Hearts Birth by Sleep
- First game: Kingdom Hearts Birth by Sleep (2010)
- Created by: Tetsuya Nomura
- Voiced by: EN: Willa Holland; JA: Megumi Toyoguchi

In-universe information
- Weapon: Keyblade
- Home: Land of Departure

Aqua (Japanese: アクア, Hepburn: Akua) is a character from Square Enix's video game franchise Kingdom Hearts. First making cameo appearances in Kingdom Hearts II and its updated version Final Mix, she is introduced in the prequel Kingdom Hearts Birth by Sleep alongside her friends Terra and Ventus. The three are Keyblade apprentices training under Keyblade Master Eraqus, and are the playable protagonists. As the only one among her friends to obtain the rank of Keyblade Master, Aqua is assigned to monitor Terra and Ventus as she combats dark creatures known as the Unversed.

She has also appeared in other Kingdom Hearts titles, including Kingdom Hearts HD 2.8 Final Chapter Prologue as the main character of the playable episode Kingdom Hearts 0.2: Birth by Sleep – A Fragmentary Passage, and as a boss and temporary playable character in Kingdom Hearts III.

Aqua is the only protagonist in Birth by Sleep whom Tetsuya Nomura did not have a point of reference to design from, and thus was designed from scratch. Later in the design process, Nomura became concerned that Aqua would not be popular, which drove his decision to make her more distinct in her personal bravery and combat abilities. Aqua is voiced by Megumi Toyoguchi in Japanese and Willa Holland in English. The character received mixed reviews from game critics upon her debut, citing boring plot lines and unenthusiastic voice acting combined with weak combat skills. However, her role in Kingdom Hearts 0.2 has been more positively received, with critics favoring her stronger characterization over previous depictions.

== Appearances ==
Before her introduction as a main character in Kingdom Hearts Birth by Sleep, Aqua made small appearances in the secret endings from Kingdom Hearts II and its re-release, Kingdom Hearts II Final Mix, both events depicting her, Terra, and Ventus confronting Xehanort at the Keyblade Graveyard. Kingdom Hearts II Final Mix also contains an additional cutscene showing Aqua's Keyblade and armor to be stored in the Chamber of Repose, a hidden room in Hollow Bastion frequented by Xemnas.

In Birth by Sleep, Aqua and her friends are Keyblade apprentices in the Land of Departure, where she obtains the "Mark of Mastery" early in the game. Under Eraqus's orders, Aqua travels to various worlds to search for a missing Xehanort and defeat the Unversed, simultaneously monitoring Terra's vulnerability to darkness and trying to retrieve Ventus when he runs away to find Terra. However, both duties bring her into conflict with her friends when she confronts Terra over his questionable activities on their quest. Aqua later reunites with her friends at the Keyblade Graveyard, where Terra is possessed by Xehanort and Ventus sacrifices his heart to prevent the creation of the χ-blade. Aqua uses Eraqus's Keyblade to transform the Land of Departure into Castle Oblivion, leaving Ventus's catatonic body there before confronting the possessed Terra at Radiant Garden. When Xehanort unlocks his own heart to subdue a resisting Terra and sinks into the realm of darkness, Aqua dives in and salvages Terra's body, causing her to become trapped there. In the game's secret ending, Aqua meets Ansem the Wise at the realm's edge and learns from him about the heroics of Sora, whom she had encountered as a young boy during her travels. Her time in the realm of darkness is depicted in the game's Final Mix release and Kingdom Hearts 0.2: Birth by Sleep – A Fragmentary Passage; in the latter, she encounters her friend Mickey Mouse by chance during the events of the first Kingdom Hearts game before remaining behind to fend off the Heartless attacking Riku.

Aqua makes cameo appearances in Kingdom Hearts Re:coded, where she is revealed to be one of the many people connected with Sora's heart, and in Kingdom Hearts 3D: Dream Drop Distance as part of Sora's memories and in the ending, where she is shown at the shores of the dark realm. In Kingdom Hearts III, Aqua is corrupted when Xehanort's Heartless casts her into the dark realm's oceanic abyss, but is purified after Sora defeats her and returns her to the realm of light. She subsequently restores the Land of Departure to wake Ventus, who is revived when Sora returns his heart to him. The two join the other Keyblade wielders in battle against Organization XIII, during which Sora helps free Terra from Xehanort's control, reuniting the three friends. Aqua and the other Keyblade wielders later help keep the door to Kingdom Hearts closed, allowing Sora to defeat Xehanort. Aqua and her friends return home afterwards, joining their friends in a celebration on Destiny Islands before Sora disappears after using the power of waking to revive Kairi. In the Kingdom Hearts III Re Mind DLC, one year after Sora's disappearance, Aqua, Terra and Ventus enter the Realm of Darkness to look for clues to Sora's whereabouts.

Aqua also appears in Super Smash Bros. Ultimate as a Spirit.

== Creation and development ==
For Aqua's unnamed first appearance in the secret ending of Kingdom Hearts II, director Tetsuya Nomura stated he did not design her appearance, but had instead focused on what her story would be. While unwilling say who the character was, Nomura pointed that new character's scenes occurred prior to the events from the first game. Following the release of Kingdom Hearts II Final Mix, Nomura revealed more details about Aqua such as a connection with the character Xemnas. Nomura also revealed her name as said by the Lingering Will in Kingdom Hearts II Final Mix, and explained that her name follows the "water" theme brought by Kairi's name. However, a connection with Kairi was not intended, but rather with the series' main characters whose names bear various themes.

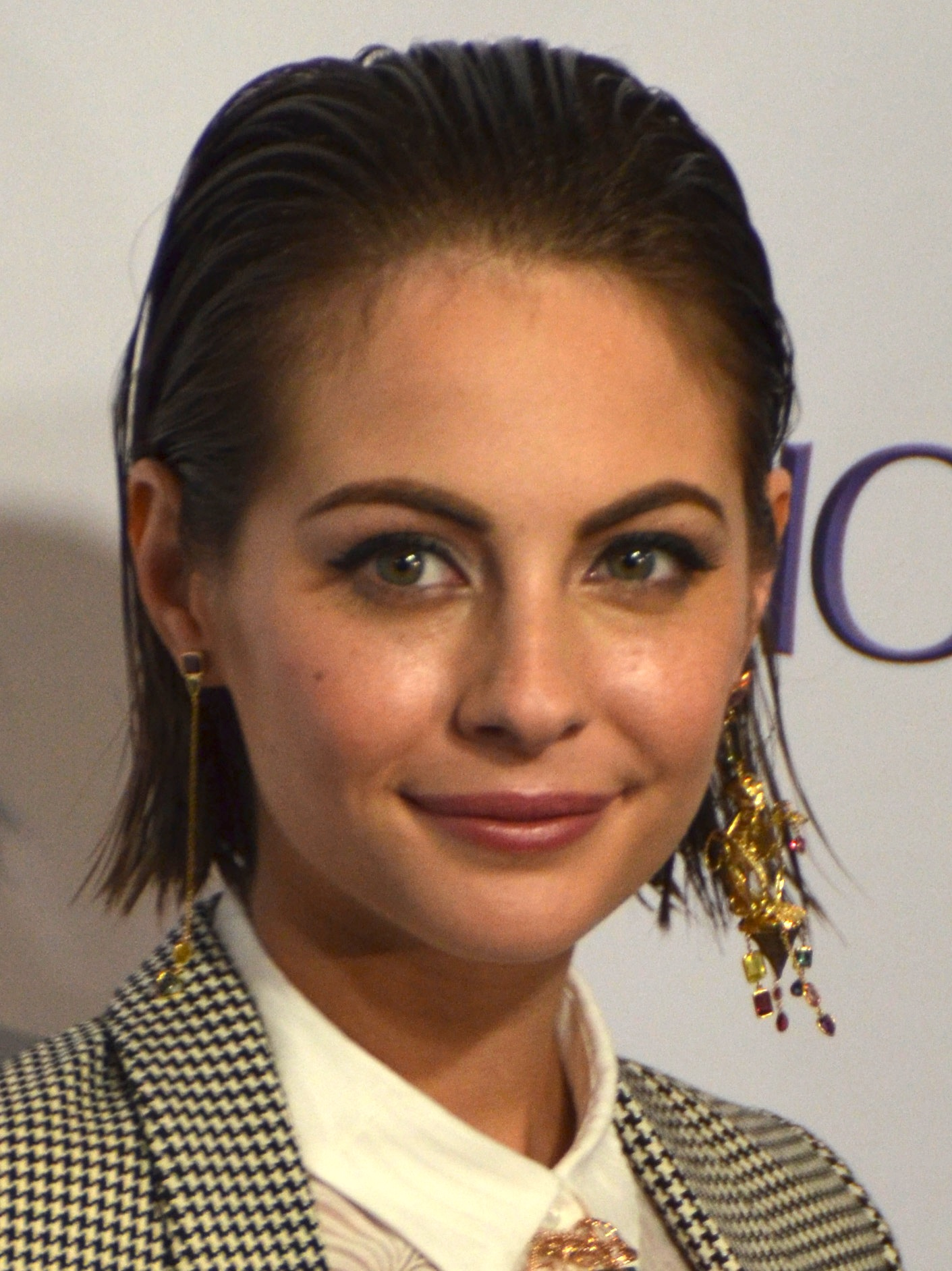
Willa Holland has voiced Aqua in all her English appearances.

In contrast to Terra and Ventus, Aqua did not have a reference point for the characters design, leading Nomura to create a completely new character from scratch. Her outfit was based on Terra's Japanese-inspired clothes, which are meant to expand the student-and-teacher bond shown in the game. Aqua's outfit was altered three times during the game's development. Nomura felt the open back of Aqua's outfit presented at the Tokyo Game Show 2009 was too revealing and modified the design to be more conservative. As with Terra and Ventus, the making of Aqua's outfit created issues for Nomura like how she would be able to summon her armor. To remedy this, an "X" was added to her clothes as a means to activate her armor. When designing Aqua, Nomura was worried the character would be unpopular due to her weak connection with other Kingdom Hearts characters. This led to a push to make the character distinctly "strong", which Nomura also did with Xion for Kingdom Hearts 358/2 Days, but in a different way. While Xion was also a "brave girl", Nomura wanted to retain Aqua's feminine qualities along with her strength. After design was completed, Nomura was still unsure of how Aqua would be received. After the game's release, however, Nomura noted her popularity with fans, and referenced Megumi Toyoguchi's work as her voice actress as one of the reasons. Toyoguchi had already worked with Nomura in Final Fantasy X-2 voicing Paine, one of the game's protagonists. While Toyoguchi used a low tone with Paine, she used a tone closer to her original voice when performing as Aqua, which Nomura praised.

From the beginning of Kingdom Hearts Birth by Sleep's development, the staff decided its story would have three plot lines centered around three different characters, with Aqua's being the last one written. The original ending of Aqua's storyline showed her trapped in the realm of darkness, which was moved to the game's "Last Episode" to keep the game from being too negative in tone. In terms of gameplay, Aqua was designed to be a character that players would take some getting used to. While Aqua, Terra, and Ventus' storylines can be played in any order, Nomura recommended that Aqua's be played last to understand the game's story better, pointing out the intention that Aqua would be the last character to leave the Land of Departure in her scenario. The staff developed her movements to reflect her personality as a serious and dignified young woman. In the making of Kingdom Hearts 2.8, co-director Tai Yasue expressed the staff wanted to explore Aqua's torment in this title as she became trapped in the realm of darkness to the point they showed how the character wanted to escape from it as she became isolated.

== Reception ==
Aqua's character has received mixed response from video gaming publications, with initial comments focused on her brief appearance in Kingdom Hearts II. Writing for GamesRadar, Chris Antista commented that he did not understand the importance of Aqua and the other characters being briefly featured in Kingdom Hearts II; only later was their importance explored at the end of Birth by Sleep. Having played a demo from Birth by Sleep as Aqua in the E3 2010, Ryan Clements from IGN enjoyed her character due to her gameplay mechanics. Kimberly Wallace of Game Informer described her as "one of the best and most selfless characters in the Kingdom Hearts series". She further stated that "her story about going above and beyond to protect her friends is not only noble but comes with great sacrifice, locking her away in the Realm of Darkness."

While reviewing Birth by Sleep, Adam Ghigiino from PALGN criticized her "idealistic" dialogues, finding them repetitive. PlayStation LifeStyle's Thomas Williams found the trio as welcome additions to the franchise, finding their stories enjoyable even though the three travel to the same worlds. Kevin VanOrd from GameSpot gave praise to Aqua's character, based on her personality and how it contrasts Ventus's, as well as Willa Holland's voice acting. 1UP.com's Steve Watts found Aqua's gameplay as the weakest of all the three characters as she specializes in magic techniques, which are weak during the game's start. On the other hand, Bob Miur from Destructoid found her gameplay appealing due to how it contrasts previous fighting styles seen in the Kingdom Hearts series. He also found her story less entertaining than Ventus's, but also less predictable than Terra's. Following Square's advice of using Aqua as the last playable Game Informer writer Bryan Vore liked how her actions were played with Ventus's and Terra's. However, Bore still cited Aqua's playthrough as repetitive if played as the last one, adding that its plot was weakest from all of them. Alongside Ventus and Terra, X-Play found Aqua similar to the protagonists from Kingdom Hearts, comparing her to Kairi. In contrast to Van Ord, RPGFan's Ashton Liu found Aqua's voice "bored for almost the whole game", citing how it is notable when comparing her with other voice actors such as Mark Hamill and Leonard Nimoy, who respectively voiced Eraqus and Xehanort. On the other hand, HardcoreGamer regarded Willa Holland's acting as more appealing during Kingdom Hearts III. In an ASCII Media Works poll, Aqua was voted as the twelfth most popular video game character from 2010. In a Famitsu poll from 2011, Aqua was voted as the fourth-most popular Kingdom Hearts character.

Aqua's role in Kingdom Hearts 0.2 was praised by Siliconera. The writer enjoyed how the game explores Aqua's vulnerability as well as her strength and sacrifice to protect her friends. Additionally, the writer commented that "We see that she's not some perfect heroine capable of accomplishing everything, but rather a strong woman who's willing to do what she has to for the greater good". Kimberly Wallace from Game Informer said Aqua was one of her favorite characters due to "her selflessness and determination to save the world, and getting some resolution to her story was satisfying". She also commented that she expected Aqua to play a bigger role in Kingdom Hearts III.

Nomura was surprised by people's reaction to Aqua falling into the darkness in the E3 2018 trailer for Kingdom Hearts III and expects her role in the upcoming game to surprise the audience more. In a general analysis of the portrayal of the franchise's female characters, Polygon saw Aqua as possibly the strongest one due to how central is her role in Birth by Sleep when compared to weaker ones like Kairi, Naminé, or Xion. Her return in Kingdom Hearts III was also praised, having both her working trauma experienced during her time in the Realm of Darkness, and the goal of saving her friends who she had failed to protect 10 years earlier.

In "A Girl Worth Fighting For: Kingdom Hearts III and the mystery of the missing heroines", Anime Feminist criticized Aqua's handling in Kingdom Hearts III as she becomes corrupted by darkness as an apparent attempt to make Sora look heroic, a common motif the series tends to when it comes to female characters. While Aqua still seems the strong fighter once she is returns to normal and return to Castle Oblivion to save Ventus, she is easily defeated by Vanitas reducing Aqua into helpless character who has to be saved by the cast. The writer from Anime Feminist further criticized Aqua's lack of role in the climax of Kingdom Hearts III as she does not have a notable role in saving Terra's heart from Xehanort or any interaction with the soul of Master Eraqus.
