= Kingdom Hearts Birth by Sleep =

2010 video game

- North American cover art featuring the main characters, from the top: Terra, Aqua, Mickey Mouse, and Ventus.
- Developer: Square Enix Product Development Division 5
- Publisher: Square Enix
- Directors: Tetsuya Nomura; Tai Yasue
- Producers: Patrick Chen; Yoichi Yoshimoto
- Programmers: Tamotsu Goto; Masashi Nakamichi
- Artists: Tetsuya Nomura; Takeshi Fujimoto
- Writers: Masaru Oka; Daisuke Watanabe; Tetsuya Nomura
- Composers: Yoko Shimomura; Tsuyoshi Sekito; Takeharu Ishimoto
- Series: Kingdom Hearts
- Platform: PlayStation Portable
- Release: JP: January 9, 2010; NA: September 7, 2010; AU: September 9, 2010; EU: September 10, 2010; Final Mix: JP: January 20, 2011
- Genre: Action role-playing
- Modes: Single-player, multiplayer

Kingdom Hearts Birth by Sleep (Note: Japanese: キングダム ハーツ バース バイ スリープ, Hepburn: Kingudamu Hātsu Bāsu bai Surīpu) is a 2010 action role-playing game developed and published by Square Enix in collaboration with Disney Interactive Studios for the PlayStation Portable, serving as the sixth installment in the Kingdom Hearts series. The game was released on UMD worldwide in 2010. An international version of the game titled Kingdom Hearts Birth by Sleep Final Mix was released in Japan in January 2011, featuring the changes made in the non-Japanese versions. A direct sequel, Kingdom Hearts 0.2: Birth by Sleep - A Fragmentary Passage, was released in January 2017 as a part of a bundle of games called Kingdom Hearts HD 2.8 Final Chapter Prologue.

The game utilizes an overhauled battle system different from previous games in the series which features new elements. It is a prequel to the original Kingdom Hearts, taking place ten years before its events. The game centers on the journeys of Ventus, Terra, and Aqua, characters briefly featured in Kingdom Hearts II, in their quest to locate the missing Master Xehanort and protect the worlds from creatures known as the Unversed. The player has access to the three characters' different scenarios when playing.

Development of the game began in June 2005, with parts of the game Kingdom Hearts II Final Mix meant to hint at Birth by Sleep. The game was directed by Tetsuya Nomura and co-directed by Tai Yasue. Nomura has referred to the game as "Episode 0", as well as "Episode 0.1" following the release of Kingdom Hearts χ, stating that it is on the same scale and plays as large a role in the series as Kingdom Hearts and Kingdom Hearts II. The game has been well-received, selling 1.27 million copies worldwide as of November 2010, and received positive comments from video game publications. Critics praised the game's gameplay, graphics, music, and storyline, but criticized the level design and characters. A high definition version of the Final Mix edition was released for the PlayStation 3 in 2014, PlayStation 4 in 2017, Xbox One in 2020, Windows in 2021, and Nintendo Switch as a part of the Kingdom Hearts HD 2.5 Remix collection.

== Gameplay ==
Terra battling the Trinity Armor with Aqua and Ventus

Birth by Sleep is an action role-playing game with hack and slash elements that introduces a gameplay aspect to the series called the Command System. This system allows players to customize a Command Deck with techniques and abilities that they can perform at will, called Deck Commands. Performing ordinary attacks and Commands fills a gauge displayed above the Command Deck. When certain requirements are fulfilled and the gauge is full, the player's basic attack is changed to the "Surge" Command, which racks up powerful combos depending on the active Command Style. Filling the gauge a second time replaces the "Surge" Command with the more powerful "Storm" Command.

Unlike previous games in the series, the game does not utilize Magic Points (MP) for spells or magic casting. It instead uses a system known as Focus, which is displayed in an orange gauge on the interface. The player can use Focus to perform a technique called Shotlock, in which they enter a first person mode to attack enemies with homing spells that differ with each character and technique, depleting the gauge relative to the number of enemies targeted. Once depleted, the Focus gauge gradually refills with every attack and Deck Command the player lands on an enemy.

Another aspect introduced in the game is the Dimension Link (D-Link), measured in a blue gauge on the interface. It is used to draw power from certain companions who the player characters meet during the game, such as Experiment 626, temporarily replacing the commands in the player's customized command deck with a pre-determined set of commands that differ with each D-Link. Once the command gauge is filled while performing a D-Link, a powerful finishing move is activated to take out enemies. Each finishing move has two levels which can render a finishing move more powerful than before, similar to that of the Command System. The D-Link can only be used when its corresponding gauge is filled completely, and can be activated by pressing right on the directional pad to access the D-Link menu, followed by selecting the chosen ally.

The game also features the Command Board, which appears when the player completes a world and can be accessed from save points and the world map once unlocked. Each world has its own unique Command Board with its own tricks and mechanisms. The Command Board plays like a simplified version of Fortune Street, as a die is thrown and the player moves, with each space having a unique effect. Various Disney characters from throughout the game appear on their respective Command Board to either aid or hinder the player. Special panels in the board game can trigger "special events" when the player lands on them.

=== Scenarios ===
The game is divided into three separate scenarios, with each one focusing on one of the three main characters: Terra, Aqua, and Ventus. While the first ten minutes of the story are the same regardless of the chosen character, the events that follow differ in each scenario, with each character's narrative occurring parallel to the others and intersecting with one another at different points. The gameplay of each scenario differs based on the abilities of each character, such as their power, speed, and magic: Terra deals the most physical damage, Ventus is the fastest, and Aqua specializes in magic. Players may choose which of the three scenarios they wish to start with near the beginning of the game. The recommended scenario order of play by Nomura is Terra, Ventus, then Aqua, as it allows the player to best understand the story. Completing all three scenarios unlocks the story's final chapter.

=== Multiplayer ===
The game supports up to six players at a time in four multiplayer modes, all set in a world known as the Mirage Arena. In each mode, players control one of the three main characters. In Versus, players fight against each other in a deathmatch-style game, while in Arena players fight co-operatively in a "Survival Mode" style of gameplay against waves of Unversed. Rumble Racing features players racing against each other competitively on their Keyblade vehicles, which can also be used to attack rivals. Command Board is a board game using the in-game Command Board mechanic, where players try to reach the end first as in traditional board games. Setting records in the Mirage Arena earns players medals which can be exchanged for rare items in-game. Only Ad-Hoc wireless multiplayer, where all of the players need to be physically near each other, is allowed.

== Plot ==
=== Setting ===
Birth by Sleep is a prequel set ten years prior to the first Kingdom Hearts game. Like other games in the series, the player progresses through a collection of various worlds, based on various locales from the Disney animated features canon: Dwarf Woodlands (Snow White and the Seven Dwarfs), Enchanted Dominion (Sleeping Beauty), Castle of Dreams (Cinderella), Olympus Coliseum (Hercules), Deep Space (Lilo & Stitch), Neverland (Peter Pan), and Mysterious Tower (Fantasia). The game also features various new worlds specially created for the series by Square Enix, such as the Land of Departure and Radiant Garden. Disney Town, the town surrounding the castle grounds of Disney Castle, serves as the game's minigame world. Worlds such as Destiny Islands and Castle Oblivion appear in cutscenes, while the Hundred Acre Wood from the Winnie the Pooh franchise appears as a Command Board. The staff first chose the worlds based on the game's scenario, leading to the inclusion of the Princesses' worlds. Neverland and Deep Space were included to add variety to the game, while Olympus Coliseum was selected to reflect the game's earlier setting compared to the original Kingdom Hearts.

=== Characters ===
The three main characters are Terra, Aqua, and Ventus, a trio of Keyblade apprentices training under Keyblade Master Eraqus who aspire to become Masters themselves. Another Keyblade Master, Xehanort, and his apprentice, Vanitas, serve as the game's antagonists. Other characters from previous games return, such as younger versions of Sora, Riku, and Kairi, though they have less prominent roles. Several characters who later come to form Organization XIII appear: Ansem the Wise's apprentices Braig, Dilan, Even, Aeleus, and Ienzo; and Lea and Isa, two boys from Radiant Garden. As with the Heartless in Kingdom Hearts and the Nobodies in Kingdom Hearts II, Birth by Sleep introduces a new type of enemy: the Unversed, "fledgling emotions" that are "not well-versed in their own existences" and feed on negativity.

As with other games in the series, Birth by Sleep features an extensive cast of Disney characters. The most prominent of these characters is Mickey Mouse, the king of Disney Castle, who serves as a Keyblade apprentice under the sorcerer Yen Sid at this point in the series. Donald Duck and Goofy, who assist Sora in other games, appear in smaller roles. Other Disney characters remain in their respective worlds regardless of their overall importance to the story in previous installments, such as Maleficent and Pete, who served as major antagonists between Kingdom Hearts and Kingdom Hearts II, and several of the Princesses of Heart. Like other games, some characters, such as Experiment 626, Prince Phillip, and Mickey, occasionally fight alongside the player characters in battles as partners, providing assistance and performing combos. However, unlike Donald and Goofy, they do not follow the player around constantly. Unlike other major installments, which featured various characters from throughout the Final Fantasy series, Birth by Sleep only features two of these characters: Zack Fair from Final Fantasy VII, and the Moogles, creatures from several of the Final Fantasy games, who sell items to the player. As Birth by Sleep is a prequel to the first Kingdom Hearts, the staff decided to add Zack since he is the protagonist of the Final Fantasy VII prequel, Crisis Core: Final Fantasy VII.

=== Story ===
Xehanort brings a comatose Ventus to the Destiny Islands after his heart is damaged; a newborn heart senses Ventus's heart and connects with it, saving him. Four years later, at the Land of Departure, Terra and Aqua take an exam to achieve the Mark of Mastery, with Xehanort in attendance. Eraqus passes Aqua, but fails Terra for attempting to utilize the darkness in his heart. Shortly afterward, Xehanort disappears and a horde of Unversed appear throughout the worlds. After learning about these developments from Yen Sid, Eraqus sends Terra and Aqua to travel across the various worlds to destroy the Unversed and find Xehanort. Meanwhile, Vanitas convinces Ventus to follow Terra against Eraqus's wishes, while Eraqus requests Aqua to monitor Terra and retrieve Ventus.

As the three travel through several worlds, Terra attracts the attention of villains who offer him Xehanort's whereabouts in exchange for assistance in their own agendas. He eventually finds Xehanort, who urges him to use his inner darkness to gain power. Xehanort further instructs Terra to destroy Vanitas, the source of the Unversed, who was created from the darkness extracted from Ventus's heart. The three friends briefly reunite at Radiant Garden, but a schism forms between them when they argue over Terra's presumed actions and Aqua's espionage.

Ventus encounters Xehanort, who reveals his intention to recombine Ventus and Vanitas's hearts to create an all-powerful Keyblade called the χ-blade. Xehanort sends Ventus to the Land of Departure to confront Eraqus, who attempts to destroy Ventus to foil Xehanort's plan. Terra arrives to save Ventus and duels Eraqus; upon Eraqus's defeat, Xehanort vanquishes him and enshrouds the Land of Departure in darkness, telling Terra to go to a world known as the Keyblade Graveyard. Ventus is instructed by Vanitas to do the same, as is Aqua by Yen Sid upon being informed of Eraqus's demise at Xehanort and Terra's hands.

Terra, Aqua, and Ventus reunite at the Keyblade Graveyard, where Xehanort and Vanitas reveal their plan to use the χ-blade to unlock Kingdom Hearts and reenact the Keyblade War, an apocalyptic event that nearly destroyed the world in the past. Terra's heart is consumed by darkness in the ensuing battle, and Xehanort takes over his body to replace his own aging one. However, Terra's mind remains within his discarded armor, which comes to life as the Lingering Will and defeats Xehanort. Meanwhile, Ventus is forced to fuse with Vanitas to create the χ-blade. Aqua and Mickey fight the possessed Ventus and destroy the χ-blade, while Ventus defeats Vanitas in a metaphysical battle within his own mind, but loses his heart and falls into a catatonic state as a result.

After learning of Ventus's condition from Yen Sid, Aqua puts his body in stasis at the Land of Departure, which she transforms into Castle Oblivion, then battles the possessed Terra at Radiant Garden. When Terra struggles for control of his body, Xehanort impales himself with his own Keyblade, causing him to sink into the realm of darkness. Aqua dives into the realm and rescues Terra, but becomes trapped in the process. Ansem the Wise finds an amnesiac Xehanort still possessing Terra's body, while Ventus's heart merges with that of a young Sora, the newborn who had previously saved him on the islands.

Eleven years later, Aqua meets Ansem in the realm of darkness and learns from him about Sora, who has the power to save those connected to his heart. Meanwhile, Sora learns of Terra, Ventus, and Aqua's fates from a letter sent by Mickey (Note: As depicted in Kingdom Hearts II.) and undertakes another quest to save them.

== Development ==
Development of the game began in June 2005 and was originally intended for the PlayStation 2 with Sora as the prototype protagonist of the game. Birth by Sleep was developed by Square Enix's fifth Product Development Division, based in Osaka, the same team behind Kingdom Hearts Re:Chain of Memories, and uses the same graphical engine as both Crisis Core: Final Fantasy VII and Dissidia Final Fantasy. During development of Kingdom Hearts II, the Osaka-based team had requested to be involved in a spin-off if one were to be made. Development of the game began before the release of Kingdom Hearts II Final Mix+. The plot was completed, but development was halted six months after it began due to development of Re:Chain of Memories. When development resumed, the team changed the platform to the PlayStation Portable so as to make use of the PSP's functions such as co-operative and competitive multiplayer gameplay. The title of the game is based on II Final Mix's secret ending, "Birth by Sleep", a title which director Tetsuya Nomura developed as he wanted a phrase having "by" as well as to use an English title like previous games. Nomura has referred to the game as "Episode 0", saying that the game is on the same scale and plays as big an importance as Kingdom Hearts and Kingdom Hearts II.

Early during the game's development, Nomura already had various scenes in mind such as Terra's and Riku's conversation in order to explain the latter's ability in the original games. Various parts from the plot had to be modified to make the game more light-hearted such as Eraqus' death at the hands of Xehanort after being defeated by Terra, how Aqua's scenario was supposed to end with her already trapped in the Realm of Darkness, and the relationship between Ventus and Sora. Two of the newly introduced protagonists, Ventus and Terra, were based on other characters from the franchise while Aqua's design did not have a base. Nevertheless, the three wear outfits meant to expand the student-and-teacher bond shown in the game. The Disney worlds were chosen to expand the characters of the Princesses of Light as well as Maleficent's who are connected with the events of the first Kingdom Hearts game, while the worlds of Neverland and Deep Space were chosen to add variety to the game, and Olympus Coliseum was selected to reflect the game's earlier setting compared to the original Kingdom Hearts. A world based on The Jungle Book was planned before being cut during development.

Birth by Sleep was directed by Nomura and co-directed by Tai Yasue. It was announced alongside Kingdom Hearts 358/2 Days and Kingdom Hearts Coded at the Tokyo Game Show on September 20, 2007, where a trailer was shown in a photo-prohibited theater. New trailers were shown at the 2008 Jump Festa in December 2007 and the DKΣ3713 Private Party, an invite-only event by Square Enix for fans, in August 2008; a playable demo was also available at DKΣ3713. The June 5, 2009 issue of Famitsu covered an interview with Tetsuya Nomura, where he said that the game was, at the time, at the voice recording stage. Nomura also confirmed in an interview that Birth by Sleep would contain a secret ending like in Kingdom Hearts and Kingdom Hearts II for the next game in the Kingdom Hearts series, which he confirmed to be a main game and the one which Nomura stated would link up Birth by Sleep, 358/2 Days, and coded. He also confirmed that a Birth by Sleep demo would indeed be playable at the 2009 Tokyo Games Show together with a new trailer. In early October 2009, Nomura revealed that the concept of the Command Board originated from when he was in elementary school as at that time he was fascinated with board games and even made his own; hence he wanted to incorporate a fun board game into the game.

In late October 2009, Nomura revealed he was designing the Birth by Sleep cover art and editing the staff rolls to accommodate the game's three main characters. He also revealed that they were editing the new opening movie for the game. As with coded and 358/2 Days, Yoko Shimomura, the series' main composer, composed the most prominent themes, while the rest was created by other composers. Like Kingdom Hearts and Kingdom Hearts Re: Chain of Memories, Birth by Sleep uses Hikaru Utada's theme song "Hikari" for the Japanese version and its English version, "Simple and Clean", in the other releases.

The game made its final public appearance before its Japanese release at Jump Festa 2010 on December 19, 2009, where a playable demo as well as new footage from the game were present and shown. Like previous console titles in the series, the game contains a secret movie at the end, which had been described as being more like a "true ending" rather than a teaser for the future like previous ones. Development of the movie began in October where Nomura noted in the blog that the game would contain a teaser to the next major Kingdom Hearts game similar to the teasers in previous games in the series.

== Reception ==
Reception

Aggregate score
Aggregator	Score
Metacritic	82/100

Review scores
Publication	Score
1Up.com	B+
Eurogamer	7/10
Famitsu	37/40
Game Informer	8.50/10
GameSpot	7.5/10
GamesRadar+	4/5
GameTrailers	8.8/10
GameZone	8.5/10
IGN	8.5/10
PlayStation: The Official Magazine	4/5
X-Play	4/5
RPGamer	4/5

Awards
Publication	Award
Japan Expo	Best Portable Console Videogame
ASCII Media Works	10th Best Game of 2010
GamesRadar	26th Best PSP Game

The game sold well during its first two days of release, with over 500,000 copies of the game sold in Japan. By February 14, just over a month later, the game had sold a total of 800,551 copies. Sales in North America and Europe have also been good, with the game taking high places in various categories. After its release in the United States, it was listed as the sixth bestselling video game there in September 2010 by the NPD Group. By November 2010, the game had sold 1.27 million units worldwide with 310,000 and 190,000 copies coming from North America and Europe, respectively, and the rest from Japan. In November 2011, Sony announced Birth by Sleep would receive the "Gold Prize" for selling over 500,000 units in Japan.

Prior to the game's release, IGN expressed their excitement at the release of the game in 2010 having played the demo. 1UP.com echoed similar statements, praising the visuals and stating it "plays better" than the previous Kingdom Hearts games. They had some complaints regarding Ventus' demo due to constant jumping, but further stated that the demo gave them an idea of "how the game is going to feel", and predicted the game would improve the series. 1UP also put it on their article "Top 10 PSP Games of 2010", while Gamasutra put it in their "The Most Anticipated Games Of 2010" and "The Most-Awaited Games Of 2009: PlayStation Portable" articles. IGN featured it as nominated of 2010's "Best of E3 Award" in the category Best PSP Games. GameTrailers also had praise for the new title and gave it a nomination for Best PSP Game of E3 2010.

Kingdom Hearts Birth by Sleep has received positive reviews from gaming reviewers. The game's average score is of 82 out of 100 on Metacritic, becoming the fourth highest ranking Kingdom Hearts game behind Kingdom Hearts, Kingdom Hearts II, and Kingdom Hearts III. The game has been highly praised by Japanese gaming magazine, Famitsu, whose four reviewers gave scores of 10/9/9/9, for a total of 37/40, the third-highest rated game in the Kingdom Hearts series behind Dream Drop Distance and Kingdom Hearts II. They praised the game's graphics and music, calling them "superb", as well as praising the wide variety of customization available to the players due to the three unique playable characters. It also praised the design of boss battles, calling them "lively and exciting". English websites have also given praise to the game with GameZone calling it "amazing title that every KH fan must play", finding it the best portable game from the series. RPGamer praised the "evolution" from the gameplay ever since the series' start. PlayStation: The Official Magazine (PSM) agreed calling the fighting system "one of the deepest, most rewarding" ones from the PSP. IGN called its battle system "unique", labeling it as the best one from all the series and having a campaign story. 1UP praised the differences between the protagonists' fighting styles with PSM comparing them with different classes of RPG characters. A common complaint has been the game's loading times, which tended to be long depending on the PlayStation Portable's memory. Reviewers also called the game's worlds "hollow due to the lack of interaction, and also criticized the game's camera which sometimes made fights confusing. Visuals were also well received for being similar to the ones from PlayStation 2's games with praise on the design of the worlds, although a lack of details was also noted.

Sites have also praised the game's story, for its accessibility as a result of being a prequel, or that it did not bear elements from previous games that tended to confuse gamers such as the characters' identities. Critics also appreciated how the story is told from three different perspectives, which helped to give different point of views as well as expand the time the game can be played. Nevertheless, some character traits were criticized such as the similarities between the protagonists to previous ones. While Eurogamer cited that the three characters had little impact to the Disney worlds' storyline, Terra's role was praised by 1UP.com for distancing itself from previous scenarios. Although the lack of Final Fantasy characters received mixed opinions, PSM thought that it helped to expand the exploration of Disney worlds, while Zack's role was found suitable by GameZone. The English casting for Birth by Sleep also received positive comments with GameTrailers stating that it "features one of the few good English dubs in recent memory", particularly Leonard Nimoy's performance. GameSpot praised Jesse McCartney and Willa Holland's performances as Ventus and Aqua, but criticized that of Jason Dohring as Terra.

IGN featured the game in their "Game of the Month" article series for September 2010 in the PSP category. The game has been listed as one of the best PlayStation Portable titles with GamesRadar placing it sixth and IGN eighteenth. In an ASCII Media Works poll, it was listed as the tenth best game of 2010. It won in the category of "Best Portable Console Videogame" in France's 2011 Japan Expo.

== Versions and merchandise ==
Kingdom Hearts Birth by Sleep was also released with a limited edition PSP-3000 as a bundle in Japan featuring designs from the Kingdom Hearts series on its back. On March 16, 2010, Square Enix announced the English version of the game, which was released on September 7, 2010, in North America, and on September 10, 2010, in PAL regions. The English version of the game contains some adjustments from the original version, such as a new difficulty setting called Critical Mode, and additional songs for the Ice Cream Beat minigame. A new boss known only as the Unknown appears in the overseas versions, as well as a new gameplay element called "Crown Stickers", which act much the same way as the Puzzle Pieces from Kingdom Hearts II Final Mix. The game also has a notable voice-acting cast of returning members such as Jesse McCartney and James Woods, as well as numerous new actors such as Willa Holland, Jason Dohring, Leonard Nimoy, and Mark Hamill. An Ultimania guidebook of the game was released on March 25, 2010. Like previous games, a light novel of Birth by Sleep has been written by Tomoko Kanemaki and illustrated by Shiro Amano. Its first volume, "Something Strange" was published by Square Enix on December 24, 2010, the second - "Best Friends" - on February 24, 2011, and the third and final volume, "To the Future", on May 26, 2011. Additionally, the tracks featured in the game have been released as part of a three-disc album which includes the soundtracks from Birth by Sleep, 358/2 Days, and coded.

=== Final Mix ===
In early 2010, Nomura was asked in an interview if Square Enix would release an international Final Mix of Kingdom Hearts Birth by Sleep, to which he replied he would like to, as he enjoyed the work from the English voice casting done in the previous games. However, he stated that one of the main reasons for the popularity of the Final Mix version of Kingdom Hearts II was because it was released alongside the PlayStation 2 remake of Kingdom Hearts: Chain of Memories, so he and the staff would think on it more. In September 2010, Square Enix announced that Kingdom Hearts Birth by Sleep Final Mix would be released on January 20, 2011, in Japan. Like all Final Mix releases, it combines English audio with Japanese game text and subtitles, and includes all additional features implemented in the Western versions as well as brand new content, such as a new playable secret episode for Aqua, which takes place after the events of the final episode, and also has new cutscenes with dialogue provided by her voice actress Megumi Toyoguchi, which were later dubbed into English by Aqua's English voice actress Willa Holland for the HD 2.5 Remix release. The events of the secret episode would tie-in to the later A Fragmentary Passage release. Alongside The 3rd Birthday, Final Mix includes a code that allows players to obtain downloadable content for Dissidia 012 Final Fantasy, with Final Mix featuring the character Cloud Strife costume from the original Kingdom Hearts. Final Mix topped the video game charts following its release with 77,317 units sold in the first week, and reaching 106,276 in February 2011. Final Mix was released for the first time outside Japan as part of Kingdom Hearts HD 2.5 Remix.

=== HD 2.5 Remix ===
In the credits of Kingdom Hearts HD 1.5 Remix, clips of Kingdom Hearts Birth by Sleep Final Mix were shown, hinting at its inclusion in another collection. On October 14, 2013, Square Enix announced Kingdom Hearts HD 2.5 Remix, a second compilation exclusively for the PlayStation 3 after HD 1.5 Remix. The release includes both Kingdom Hearts II Final Mix and Kingdom Hearts Birth by Sleep Final Mix in HD with trophy support. Additionally, the collection includes HD cinematic scenes from Kingdom Hearts Re:coded. It was released in Japan on October 2, 2014, North America on December 2, 2014, Australia on December 4, 2014, and Europe on December 5, 2014.

=== A Fragmentary Passage ===
In September 2015, Square Enix announced Kingdom Hearts HD 2.8 Final Chapter Prologue. The collection features Kingdom Hearts 0.2: Birth by Sleep -A fragmentary passage-, a new game taking place after the events of the original Birth by Sleep, told from the perspective of Aqua. The collection also features an HD remaster of Kingdom Hearts 3D: Dream Drop Distance as well as Kingdom Hearts χ Back Cover, a cinematic retelling of Kingdom Hearts χ that reveals new parts of the series' history. It was released in Japan on January 12, 2017, and in other countries on January 24, 2017.
