= Shiro Amano =

Japanese manga artist

Shiro Amano 天野 シロ
- Area: Manga artist
- Notable works: Legend of Mana and Kingdom Hearts manga adaptations

Shiro Amano (天野 シロ, Amano Shiro; born January 4, 1976) is a Japanese manga artist who has worked on several projects, including his adaptation on the popular Kingdom Hearts series.

== Career ==
Amano worked on the manga adaptation of the Legend of Mana video game series. It was serialized from 2000 to 2002 and published in five volumes.

Amano also worked on the Kingdom Hearts manga adaptations, following the events that took place in the video games with differences to account for the loss of interactivity a video game provides. The manga was originally serialized in Japan by Square Enix's Monthly Shōnen Gangan and eventually released in tankōbon format. The first tankōbon was released in Japan in October 2003. The manga was released in the US by Tokyopop two years later in October 2005. Yen Press now holds the rights to publish the books for the USA market. The first series, Kingdom Hearts, consists of four volumes, while the second series, Kingdom Hearts: Chain of Memories, has two volumes. The third series, Kingdom Hearts II, has ten volumes and went on hiatus between the fifth and sixth volumes while Amano published a fourth series, Kingdom Hearts 358/2 Days, which had five volumes. A fifth series, Kingdom Hearts III, began publication in 2019 and currently has 3 volumes. The games have also been adapted as a light novel series, written by Tomoco Kanemaki and illustrated by Shiro Amano. Like the manga series, it is divided into separate series based on the games.

== Works ==
List of manga and novel works
Title	Year	Notes	Refs
Legend of Mana manga	2000–02	Published in Bros. Comics, 5 volumes	
Boku to watashi no hen'ai jijō (ボクとワタシの変愛事情)	2010–11 (vol.)	Published in 2 volumes	
Kaburi mon sutā☆ (かぶりもんスター☆, Kaburi Monster)	2007	Published in 1 volume	
Kingdom Hearts manga	2003 (vol.)	Serialized in Monthly Shōnen Gangan; Published in Bros. Comics, 4 volumes	
Kingdom Hearts: Chain of Memories manga		Published in Gangan Comics, 2 volumes	
Kingdom Hearts II manga		Published in Gangan Comics, 10 volumes	
Kingdom Hearts 358/2 Days manga		Published in Gangan Comics, 5 volumes	
Kingdom Hearts III manga		Published in Gangan Comics, 4 volumes	
Scratch!		Published by Magi-Cu Comics, 1 volume	
The World Ends with You manga		Serialized in Monthly Shōnen Gangan as 2 one-shot chapters.	
Neo: The World Ends with You manga	2021	Serialized in Monthly Shōnen Gangan as one-shot chapter.	
Breath of Fire IV novel Illustrator			
Kingdom Hearts novel series Illustrator			

List of crew roles in video games
Year	Title	Crew role	Notes	Refs
	Dragon Quest & Final Fantasy in Itadaki Street Special	Character Designer		
	Dragon Quest & Final Fantasy in Itadaki Street Portable	Character Designer		
	Itadaki Street DS	Character Designer		
	Super Deformed Gundam			
	Lord of Vermilion			

=== Artbook ===
- Amano Shiro (天野 シロ) Art Works Kingdom Hearts
