= Kingdom Hearts: Chain of Memories =

2004 video game

- North American box art
- Developers: Square Enix; Jupiter
- Publishers: WW: Square Enix; PAL: Nintendo
- Directors: Tetsuya Nomura; Aguro Tanaka
- Producers: Shinji Hashimoto; Yoshinori Kitase; Hatao Ogata
- Artists: Tetsuya Nomura; Takayuki Odachi; Tomohiro Hasegawa
- Writer: Daisuke Watanabe
- Composer: Yoko Shimomura
- Series: Kingdom Hearts
- Platforms: Game Boy Advance; PlayStation 2
- Release: Game Boy Advance: JP: November 11, 2004; NA: December 7, 2004; AU: January 13, 2005; EU: May 6, 2005; Re:Chain of Memories; PlayStation 2: JP: March 29, 2007; NA: December 2, 2008
- Genre: Action-role playing
- Modes: Single-player, multiplayer

Kingdom Hearts: Chain of Memories (Note: Japanese: キングダム ハーツ チェイン オブ メモリーズ, Hepburn: Kingudamu Hātsu Chein Obu Memorīzu) is a 2004 action role-playing game developed by Square Enix and Jupiter and published by Square Enix in collaboration with Disney Interactive for the Game Boy Advance (GBA). The second game in the Kingdom Hearts series, it is a direct sequel to Kingdom Hearts whose ending is set about a year before the events of Kingdom Hearts II. Chain of Memories follows Sora and his friends as they explore Castle Oblivion while battling Organization XIII, a new group of antagonists. The game uses a new card-based battle system rather than its predecessor's real-time combat system, and it was one of the first GBA games to incorporate full-motion video (FMV).

Though it was not as successful as the other Kingdom Hearts games, Chain of Memories received positive reviews and sold well. It was praised for its story, graphics, and FMVs, but its card-based battle system was criticized. When it debuted in Japan, the game sold over 100,000 units in 48 hours. Chain of Memories was remade for the PlayStation 2 (PS2) as Kingdom Hearts Re:Chain of Memories, which was packaged with Kingdom Hearts II Final Mix and released in Japan in March 2007. The remake was released in North America on December 2, 2008, and was remastered in high-definition (HD) and included in the Kingdom Hearts HD 1.5 Remix collection—released in 2013 for the PlayStation 3 (PS3) and later for PlayStation 4 (PS4), Xbox One, and personal computer (PC).

== Gameplay ==
Sora battles Vexen. Player information, including cards and HP, is located on the left side of the screen while enemy information is located on the right.

Kingdom Hearts: Chain of Memories is a combination of a role-playing video game and a collectible card game. There is an experience point system that can be used to increase the character's maximum health and Card Points or to learn new skills. The cards are used in the progression of the story and in combat. The game features a world map and a battle screen. The world map is an isometric area where the player traverses rooms. Enemies inhabit the world and track the player to engage in combat, which is initiated when the player and an enemy come into contact. Once in combat, the game switches to the battle screen, which uses the card-based battle system.

To advance through the game, the player uses map cards they obtain after winning battles to create rooms through "room synthesis". The map card the player chooses determines the properties of each room―including the quality of items and the strength of enemies. The color of each card has a specific effect: red cards affect the number and type of enemies; green cards affect the power of the player's deck; and blue cards affect the properties of the room, such as the allowance of treasure chests or the appearance of save points.

The game has three modes; two are story modes featuring Sora and Riku, and the third is a two-player battle mode. Initially, only Sora's story mode is available; once that story is completed, the "Reverse/Rebirth" mode becomes available. Reverse/Rebirth allows the player to play the second story mode featuring Riku and the battle mode in which two players using a Game Link Cable can battle each other.

=== Combat ===
Chain of Memories uses a real-time card-based battle system. The player can jump and maneuver around the battle screen as they do on the world map, but playing cards activate all attacks and other actions. Cards are ranked from zero to nine, and they can be used to make attack combinations (combos) or to break enemy cards. Card points (CP) are required to place cards in the player's deck; except for zero-ranked cards, high-ranking cards cost more CP than low-ranking cards. The player's CP, which is increased by leveling up, limits the number of cards the player can use in a deck. Breaking an opponent's card will cancel that attack and briefly stun the character. Zero-ranked cards can break any opposing card or combo if they are played after the opposing card or combo, but can be broken by any card or combo. Special enemy cards can be obtained by defeating enemies and bosses; these give the player temporary abilities such as enhanced offensive and defensive capabilities or the ability to modify the attributes of certain cards.

Combo attacks are created by combining cards in sets of three. Because the combo's rank is the sum of its three constituent cards, these are usually more difficult to break. Some card combinations create a "sleight", a special combination that creates either a powerful physical attack, a magical spell, or a summon attack. After a card combo is played, the first card in the combo becomes unusable until the end of combat. The deck must be reloaded when the player runs out of cards.

Sora's and Riku's stories have some differences in gameplay. In Sora's story, Sora obtains cards by defeating enemies or by purchasing them at Moogle shops. In some cases, Sora must unlock specific cards through plot events before they become available. Sora can create and store three decks in the pause menu. Riku has a closed deck that cannot be customized, and the cards in his deck change depending on the world he occupies. Riku is limited to mainly physical attacks, enemy cards, and Mickey Mouse ally cards. Riku can activate "dark mode" and unlock his sleight attacks if he accumulates enough "dark points", which are earned by breaking enemy cards and combos. The difference between Riku's card or combo and the enemy's card or combo is the number of dark points Riku will accumulate for that card break.

== Plot ==
=== Setting ===
Kingdom Hearts: Chain of Memories takes place immediately after the events of Kingdom Hearts, the first game in the eponymous series. It takes place in Castle Oblivion, a mysterious castle Lord Marluxia keeps. Sora and his teammates are told that the castle causes visitors to lose their memories upon entering. The lobby and areas between floors have a flower theme, and each floor is changed into a different world from the first Kingdom Hearts game using "world cards", which are created from Sora's memories.

The worlds in Chain of Memories are created from Sora's memories, and many of the events of Kingdom Hearts are relived in this game. Sora encounters memory-based versions of Disney characters he meets in Kingdom Hearts. (Note: Except for Deep Jungle in Tarzan (1999)) The plot lines differ from those of the first game and involve memory. Chain of Memories introduces Twilight Town, a world that is created from memories on "the other side of [Sora's] heart", in addition to the original worlds of Kingdom Hearts.

=== Characters ===
Sora returns as the game's protagonist and many of the other characters from Kingdom Hearts also reappear. Chain of Memories includes characters from the Final Fantasy series and the Disney animated canon. Because each world and its characters are recreated from Sora's memories, the characters interact with Sora in a manner suggesting they have never met. The game also introduces several new characters, several of whom are members of a group called the Organization. The game's new characters include Naminé, a girl who resides in Castle Oblivion, and DiZ, a mysterious man who is concealed with red robes and bandages. Riku appears as a playable character in the second story mode; after being sealed in the realm of darkness, Mickey Mouse and DiZ help him move to the basement of Castle Oblivion.

Six members of the Organization serve as antagonists; four appear as bosses in Sora's story mode, and the other two in Riku's. Sora encounters Marluxia, the lord of Castle Oblivion; Larxene, Marluxia's assistant; Axel, a double agent with hidden loyalty; and Vexen, Marluxia's unwilling collaborator. Riku battles Vexen's allies, Zexion and Lexaeus, as well as Vexen himself. Ansem also appears in Riku's story as an entity who attempts to control him. Many of the Disney villains return via memory-based recreations.

=== Story ===
As Sora, Donald Duck, Goofy, and Jiminy Cricket are searching for Riku and King Mickey, a man wearing a black, hooded coat appears and directs Sora toward Castle Oblivion. Upon entering, the friends realize they have forgotten their abilities. The hooded man says as they proceed deep into the castle, they will lose more memories but will uncover new ones. He creates a deck of cards from their memories and tells them everything they encounter in the castle will be based on their memories.

Sora ascends the castle and fights other hooded figures who are part of a group called the Organization. As Sora loses his memories, he gradually appears to remember an old friend of his named Naminé. Organization member Larxene tells Sora that Naminé is being held prisoner in the castle. Sora clashes with a replica of Riku that was created by Vexen, another Organization member; both Sora and the replica believe the replica is the real Riku. Axel, an Organization double agent, kills Vexen for his "betrayal" to the Organization, but later releases Naminé and allows her to meet Sora. Sora discovers Naminé has been manipulating his memories under the orders of Marluxia—the man who lured Sora to the castle—as part of his and Larxene's plan to overthrow the Organization. Sora climbs to the highest floor and defeats Larxene and Marluxia, after which Naminé puts Sora and his friends into pod-like machines to help them regain their lost memories, which would cause them to forget the events that occurred in the castle. Before the group is put to sleep, Sora and Naminé promise to meet again as real friends after he reawakens.

==== Reverse/Rebirth ====
In "Reverse/Rebirth", which occurs concurrently with the game's main story, Riku is transported from the realm of darkness to Castle Oblivion's deepest basement. As he traverses the castle, Riku fights figments of previous enemies to combat his inner darkness. Vexen fights Riku to obtain his data and creates Riku's replica to counter Marluxia's plan. Ansem tries to regain control of Riku, still residing within his heart, but Mickey's power keeps Ansem at bay. Along the way, Riku defeats Lexaeus, a member of Vexen's circle, but is dragged into the realm of darkness. Mickey saves Riku before Ansem nearly succeeds in taking Riku's body as his own.

Following Marluxia's elimination, another of Vexen's allies, Zexion, attempts to dispose of Riku by drowning him in light. Riku is saved by Naminé disguised as Kairi, who helps him to control his darkness, allowing Riku to defeat Zexion. Riku later meets DiZ, an enigmatic masked individual who sends him to find Naminé. Riku's replica, who has learned of his altered memories, kills Zexion and steals his abilities under Axel's manipulation, seeking to justify his existence by killing Riku, but Riku destroys the replica. Naminé urges Riku to either confront Ansem directly or seal him within his heart at the cost of his memories; Riku chooses the former and defeats Ansem after DiZ summons him for Riku to fight. Riku then sets out with Mickey, resolving to make use of both darkness and light.

== Development ==
Early concept art of the card-based battle system

The idea for an intermediary title in the Kingdom Hearts series was developed after the director Tetsuya Nomura and his team had begun to develop ideas for the second game, which he had intended to be set a year after the original. The new game's original title was Kingdom Hearts: Lost Memories, which Nomura changed to match the story's outline while still reflecting the theme of memories. Chain of Memories was developed to bridge the gap between Kingdom Hearts and Kingdom Hearts II. Like most sequels, Kingdom Hearts II was planned to have the character start ability-wise from the beginning. To explain the loss of abilities gained in the previous game, Nomura centered the story around Sora's memories becoming corrupted and implemented the card-battle system to symbolize Sora's memories.

Nomura was hesitant about releasing a Kingdom Hearts title on the Game Boy Advance (GBA), feeling the three-dimensional (3D) graphics of the original game would not translate well into two dimensions (2D). Nomura changed his position after hearing children wanted to play Kingdom Hearts on the GBA. After exploring ideas for the gameplay, he felt a 2D Kingdom Hearts game would be possible, and that it could still feel like and play like the original. Nomura wanted to give the game a "lighter tone" than the series' PlayStation 2 (PS2) games.

Chain of Memories was announced along with Kingdom Hearts II at the Tokyo Game Show in September 2003. Initial details included the switch to 2D graphics, the use of cards to perform attacks, and the use of compressed movies in some cut scenes. The cut-scene animations were rendered using the graphical engine of the PlayStation 2 iteration and then encoded for the GBA using a technology developed by the Japanese company AM3. To help market the game, Disney and Square Enix launched official Japanese websites. A playable demo was released to the public at the 2003 Jump Festa in Japan; this demo and later ones highlighted the card-based combat system. Aside from information gathered from the opening sequences, most details about the story were kept secret until the release.

The card-based gameplay of Chain of Memories would later inspire the gameplay of Jupiter's next game The World Ends with You; originally, the developers envisioned a similar card game-based system taking place on the lower screen of the Nintendo DS, but this later developed into a battle system that occurs on both screens with a card-game controlled on the upper screen.

=== Audio ===
Music from Kingdom Hearts, including the main vocal theme "Hikari" (光), was reused in the Japanese release of Chain of Memories. An English version titled "Simple And Clean" is used in Western releases. Additional and reworked tracks were created for the PlayStation 2 re-release Kingdom Hearts Re:Chain of Memories. Because the first game's music was reused, a standalone Chain of Memories soundtrack was never released. The new reworked tracks, however, are included on two CDs in the release Kingdom Hearts Original Soundtrack Complete.

Due to the technical limitations of the GBA's cartridge size, voice acting was kept to a minimum, and was mostly used for battle sequences. Many characters from Kingdom Hearts were voiced by the same cast; in the Japanese version, new characters are voiced by Keiji Fujiwara (Axel), Tatsuya Kando (Vexen, Marluxia, and Lexaeus), and Rieko Katayama (Larxene). Voice clips from Kingdom Hearts were inserted into Chain of Memories. The English version has no dialogue; the voices during Organization battles are replaced with simple grunts, laughter, and other battle cries.

== Versions and merchandise ==
Similar to Kingdom Hearts, a great deal of merchandise was produced to market the release of Kingdom Hearts: Chain of Memories. To coincide with the video game's release, Square Enix first released, exclusively in Japan, a limited-edition Kingdom Hearts Game Boy Advance SP set that contained the game, a "Kingdom deep silver" GBA SP bearing the Kingdom Hearts logo, and a carrying strap. The second release was a Kingdom Hearts trading card game (TCG) produced by Tomy. The TCG includes starter decks, playing mats, and booster packs. Fantasy Flight Games later acquired the rights to market the TCG in English-speaking countries.

In 2007, a remake for the PS2 titled Kingdom Hearts Re:Chain of Memories was released with Kingdom Hearts II Final Mix in a set called Kingdom Hearts II Final Mix+. A manga series ran in Monthly Shōnen Gangan in Japan, and was later released in the United States. The PS2 edition was accompanied by three novels, two of which are set in Sora's storyline and the third occurs in Riku's story. As with the Final Fantasy games and the first Kingdom Hearts game, Square released an Ultimania book on Kingdom Hearts: Chain of Memories following the game's release. In North America, BradyGames released a strategy guide with a comprehensive walk-through.

=== Re:Chain of Memories ===
Comparison of a scene involving Sora, Donald, Goofy and Aerith on the GBA (top) and the PS2 (bottom)

The PS2 remake Kingdom Hearts Re:Chain of Memories was developed by Square Enix's Osaka-based fifth Product Development Division, and was released as the second disc of Kingdom Hearts II Final Mix+ in Japan on March 29, 2007, and as a stand-alone title in North America on December 2, 2008. It has not been released for the PS2 in Europe or Australia, but saw a worldwide release as part of Kingdom Hearts HD 1.5 Remix. The remake includes polygonal, 3D battles and worlds that use the same graphics as those of Kingdom Hearts, and voice acting and an improved soundtrack. While the card-based battle system and room synthesis aspects of the gameplay stayed mostly the same, there were additions, such as a "Reaction Command" function from Kingdom Hearts II. Voice-acted scenes occur in Castle Oblivion, the Destiny Islands, and the Twilight Town simulations. The remake also includes new cutscenes and battles that were not part of the original game. IGN ranked it as the 92nd-best PS2 game. The staff felt it stood out from other card-based RPGs.

=== Manga ===
Like the first game in the series, Kingdom Hearts: Chain of Memories was adapted into a manga by Shiro Amano, following the same plot as the video game. It was serialized in Japan in Square's magazine Monthly Shōnen Gangan, then released there in two volumes, and later in the United States by Tokyopop. The first volume was released in Japan on October 22, 2005, and in English on October 10, 2006, and the second volume was released on February 6, 2007.

The manga series had moderate success. The first volume was ranked 112th on USA Today's "Top 150 best sellers" during the week of its release. IGN's reviewer praised Amano's renditions of the characters and the humor in the scenes. They also commented the game's weak elements lessens the manga's overall quality. The series was followed by a third manga series, Kingdom Hearts II. The Chain of Memories manga series was re-released in a boxed set in the U.S. on October 9, 2007.

=== HD 1.5 Remix ===
In September 2012, Square Enix announced Kingdom Hearts HD 1.5 Remix, a compilation for the PlayStation 3 (PS3) that includes both Kingdom Hearts Final Mix and Re:Chain of Memories in high definition and with trophy support. The collection also includes HD cinematic scenes from Kingdom Hearts 358/2 Days. It was released in Japan on March 14, 2013, and in North America on September 10, 2013. Releases on September 12, 2013, in Australia and September 13, 2013, for Europe marked the first time Re:Chain of Memories was available those territories. This version was later ported to the PlayStation 4 (PS4) as part of Kingdom Hearts HD 1.5 + 2.5 Remix, which was released in March 2017.

== Reception ==
Reception

Aggregate score
Aggregator	Score	
Aggregator	GBA	PS2
Metacritic	76/100	68/100

Review scores
Publication	Score	
Publication	GBA	PS2
1Up.com	C+	B−
AllGame		3/5
Eurogamer	8/10	
Famitsu	36/40	
Game Informer	7.75/10	6.75/10
GamePro	3.5/5	4/5
GameSpot	7.7/10	6.5/10
GameZone	9.1/10	
IGN	8/10	8.4/10

While it was the least commercially successful game in the series, Kingdom Hearts: Chain of Memories received generally positive reviews and sold well. In Japan, it sold 104,000 units in 48 hours, a record for a Game Boy Advance title at the time. Its positive debut sales placed it at number one on sales charts in Japan. In the first month of its North American release, it was ranked first on GameSpot's ChartSpot for portable systems and sixth for all consoles. By February 2005, it had sold over one million copies in Japan and North America. Worldwide sales of the game reached 1.50 million copies by the end of 2006. (Note: Other sources say 2.5 million copies by February 2006.) In the U.S., alone, it sold 900,000 copies and earned $28 million by August 2006. Between January 2000 and August 2006, it was the 24th-highest-selling game launched for the Game Boy Advance, Nintendo DS, or PlayStation Portable in the U.S. By late 2009, Chain of Memories had sold over 1.55 million copies worldwide, with 200,000 in PAL regions, 410,000 in Japan, and 940,000 in North America.

The game received mostly positive reviews from critics. The card-based battle system received mixed reviews. GameSpot called it unwieldy while GameSpy called it engaging and Game Watch called it original. Reviews also called the card-battle system awkward and said it made the planning of strategies difficult. The U.S. television channel G4 commented the gameplay is well-suited for portable play and that it successfully combines card battles and random dungeons, calling these "two much-maligned RPG" elements. Some critics found the game's room synthesis to be too linear. The most-frequent praise went to the story; IGN called it an "engrossing storyline that actually changes up after the adventure comes to an end" and rated the presentation 10 out of 10.

The quality of the graphics, particularly those in the cut scenes, was well received. IGN praised the game's "wonderfully produced FMV sequences". GameSpot stated the movies are true to the art style of the original game and are on par with GBA video paks. They also commented on the detailed and well-animated game sprites. Game Watch described the event scenes as "high quality". Many critics stated though the graphics are not as good as those of the PS2 predecessor, they are very good for a GBA game. G4 complimented the graphics, stating Chain of Memories is "one of the best-looking GBA games out there".

During the 8th Annual Interactive Achievement Awards, the GBA version of Kingdom Hearts: Chain of Memories received a nomination for "Handheld Game of the Year".

== See also ==
- List of Disney video games
- Mega Man Battle Network – series of real-time tactical RPG games on the Game Boy Advance
