= Kingdom Hearts IV =

Upcoming 2027 video game

- Logo
- Developer: Square Enix Creative Studio 1
- Publisher: Square Enix
- Directors: Tetsuya Nomura; Tai Yasue
- Artist: Tetsuya Nomura
- Writers: Tetsuya Nomura; Masaru Oka; Akiko Ishibashi
- Composer: Yoko Shimomura
- Series: Kingdom Hearts
- Engine: Unreal Engine 5
- Platforms: Nintendo Switch 2; PlayStation 5; Windows; Xbox Series X/S
- Release: WW: Late 2027
- Genre: Action role-playing
- Mode: Single-player

Kingdom Hearts IV (Note: Japanese: キングダム ハーツIV, Hepburn: Kingudamu Hātsu Fō) is an upcoming action role-playing game developed and published by Square Enix. It will be the fifteenth installment in the Kingdom Hearts series, beginning the "Lost Master" story arc. Set after the events of Kingdom Hearts III and Kingdom Hearts: Melody of Memory, returning protagonist Sora has become trapped in the life-like world of Quadratum, while his companions Donald Duck and Goofy try to find and rescue him.

Development on the next mainline entry after Kingdom Hearts III had begun by January 2020, with Kingdom Hearts IV formally announced in April 2022. Additional details for the game were revealed in mid-2026, along with the game's release window.

Kingdom Hearts IV is scheduled to be released on the Nintendo Switch 2, PlayStation 5, Windows, and Xbox Series X/S in late 2027.

== Gameplay ==
Sora faces Heartless in the game. Parkour elements and Keyblade transformations return, with the Keyblade also able to transform into a grappling hook to traverse large distances. The Keyblade also provides additional combat capabilities, such as turning into a guitar in the Coco world. The game will have reaction commands similar to Kingdom Hearts II, and introduces a new "scrap and build" mechanic. More of Sora's "daily life" and his "day-to-day routines" are also explored. Mickey Mouse is also a playable character, performing puzzle-based gameplay within paper-like levels set within a book. Donald Duck and Goofy are also playable, a first for the series. Team "limit" attacks also return.

== Story ==
=== Setting ===
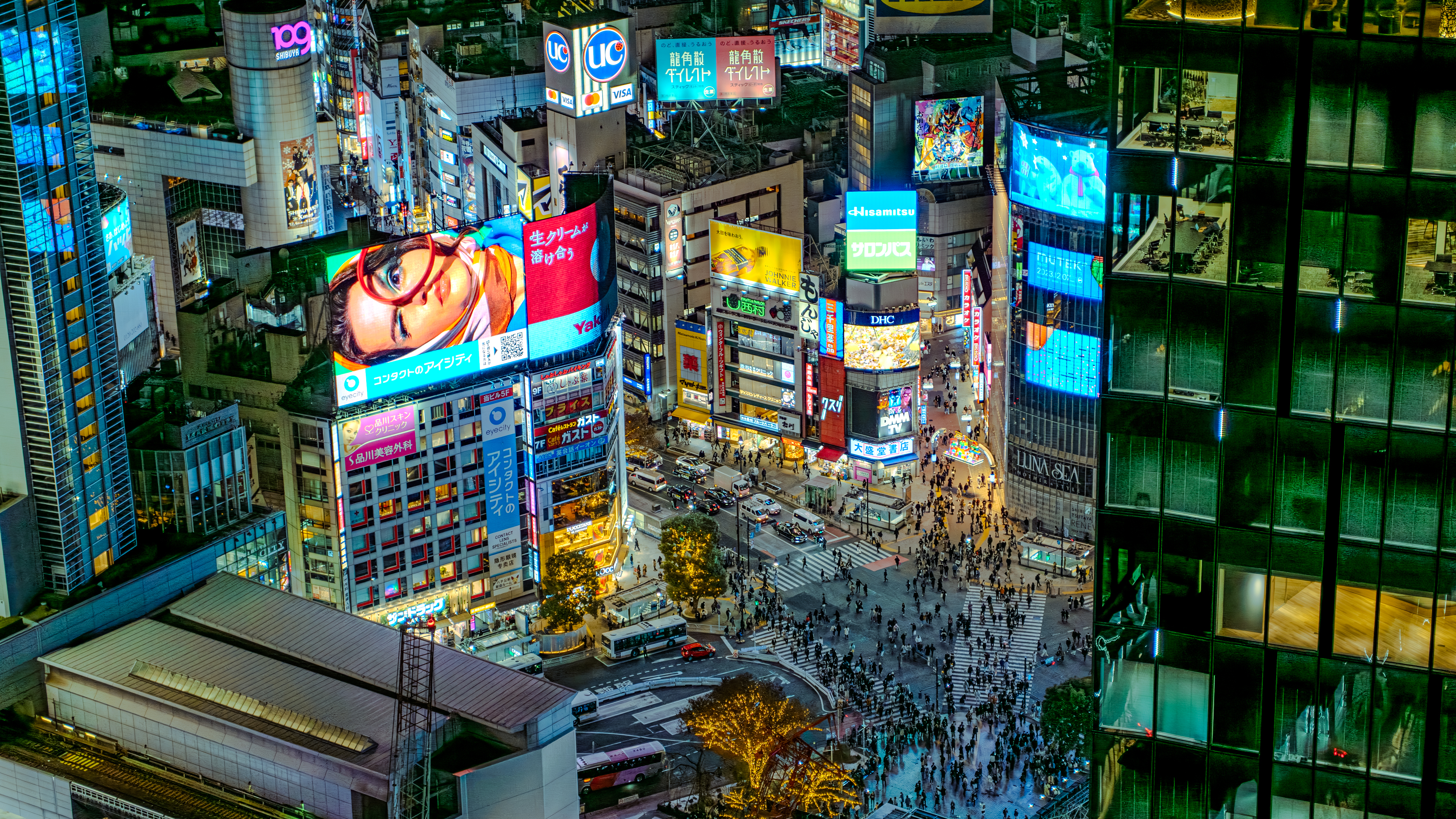
Quadratum features a fictionalized Shibuya (pictured).

Kingdom Hearts IV serves as the beginning of the "Lost Master" story arc. One of the worlds in which the game takes place is Quadratum, an expansive city set in a realistic world inspired by Tokyo, featuring a fictionalized Shibuya and Minami-Aoyama. Sora's apartment in Minami-Aoyama serves as the player's home base in the early part of the game. Quadratum serves as a hub world, with players returning there after traveling to other worlds. The original world Scala ad Calum returns.

Several worlds based on Disney properties also appear. Returning ones include the Hercules-based Underworld, while new ones include a world based on the 2017 Pixar film Coco.

=== Characters ===
Sora, a teenager who uses a key-shaped weapon called the Keyblade to battle the forces of darkness, reprises his role from previous games as the main protagonist. Donald Duck and Goofy, the royal magician and knight captain of Disney Castle respectively, also return after having served as Sora's party companions. Mickey Mouse also returns from previous games. Sora serves as a member of the Dandelions, an organization working with the government of Quadratum, who share their name with the group from the mobile game Kingdom Hearts Union χ. Their other members include Strelitzia and Sigurd, Keyblade wielders who previously appeared in Union χ, and Vali, who appeared in the mobile game Kingdom Hearts Union χ Dark Road. Other main characters of the series, such as the protagonists of the games Kingdom Hearts Birth by Sleep and Kingdom Hearts 358/2 Days, will have minor roles in Kingdom Hearts IV, with Nomura open to finding a "good balance" with regards to including Final Fantasy characters that have been a part of the series. Disney and Pixar characters who serve as members of Sora's party include Miguel and Héctor from Coco. Other Disney and Pixar characters that appear include Ernesto de la Cruz, and the villains Hades and Maleficent, the latter who plays a "very important role" in the game.

== Development ==
Though Kingdom Hearts III is the end of the "Dark Seeker Saga" which revolved around Xehanort, it had been decided where certain characters end up to potentially continue their stories in future games. The ending of Kingdom Hearts III and its downloadable content (DLC) Re Mind sees Sora's arrival in the city of Quadratum and the appearance of the character Yozora, who is the main character of the in-universe video game Verum Rex. Quadratum has design elements that evoke Shibuya from Square Enix's franchise The World Ends with You, as well as Final Fantasy Versus XIII, which was reworked to become Final Fantasy XV; Yozora's design is also similar to Noctis Lucis Caelum, the main protagonist of Final Fantasy XV, and part of his appearance mimics an early trailer for Versus XIII. Commentators believed series director Tetsuya Nomura, who was also the director of Versus XIII before it was reworked, was planning to implement some of his ideas from that game in a future Kingdom Hearts title. In March 2020, Nomura said Versus XIII and Verum Rex were "completely different" but an "unexpected development" between the two was occurring, and later confirmed the Shibuya in Quadratum was unrelated to that in The World Ends with You.

In January 2020, Nomura said there would need to be "more time" before the next main entry in the series. Additionally, he revealed that there were two new development teams, separate from those that worked on the Re Mind DLC and the Union χ/Dark Road team, working on Kingdom Hearts content. In September 2020, Nomura stated that the development team was in the process of discussing the series's future plans between Square Enix and Disney, and that "nothing has been set in stone, but I do have some concepts percolating in my head". He added that Yozora would "definitely... be involved" in the future of the series, in an unexpected and surprising way.

In April 2022, Square Enix revealed Kingdom Hearts IV was in development during the series's 20th anniversary celebration. The game is being developed by Square Enix Creative Studio 1, the same Osaka-based team that developed Kingdom Hearts III, with Tai Yasue serving as co-director, and Masaru Oka and Akiko Ishibashi joining Nomura to write the game. The game's reveal trailer was created with Unreal Engine 4, with the final game planned to be made with Unreal Engine 5. Wesley Leblanc of Game Informer felt Nomura was able to realize his vision for Versus XIII with the game and the "Verum Rex side of the franchise", and called the inclusion of Donald and Goofy at the end of the trailer a way to reassure players that the Disney elements of the franchise would continue. Nomura had also originally planned to create the Verum Rex game in its entirety, but noted the difficulty of creating two console games simultaneously. Kingdom Hearts IV's theme was described by Nomura as the contrast between the inhabitants of Sora's original world believing the inhabitants of Quadratum are fictional and vice versa.

In June 2022, Nomura revealed that the mobile game Kingdom Hearts Missing-Link would be connected to Kingdom Hearts IV, explaining that there were "some figures that appear" in Missing-Link that were tied to the story of IV. However, Missing-Link was cancelled in May 2025. Shortly after, the series's social media account shared a development update and some screenshots of Kingdom Hearts IV and said more information would be shared "when the time is right". In September 2025, Nomura said development was "going according to schedule", and new footage was shown in a Nintendo Direct presentation in June 2026. At Disney's D23 2026, the Coco world was revealed along with the game's late 2027 release window, while an extended trailer of the Coco world was shown at a dedicated panel for the series at the convention. At the panel, Nomura and Yasue confirmed development was going smoothly and reaffirmed that the game would hit its release window. Nomura later confirmed the Union χ games were "heavily integrated" into Kingdom Hearts IV's story, with a member of the mobile development team who had previously worked on distilling the series' lore in to an easy-to-understand manner joining on IV to assist with this as well, particularly when discussing the series with Disney. He also said the game's script was double that of Kingdom Hearts III.

=== World selection ===
The worlds for the game are chosen by Nomura that allow for unique gameplay experiences, while also connecting to the overall themes of the game's story. This was particularly the case with the Coco world, which Nomura felt had a good "synergy" with Sora's story. The Coco world was the first chosen for the game. The advancement of graphical capabilities since the series began played a limiting factor in determining the number of worlds created for the game, with Kingdom Hearts IV having the least amount of worlds in the series to date given the level of detail in each. Several commentators believed the forest-like world included in the game's initial 2022 trailer was the moon Endor from the Star Wars franchise, noting the presence of an object resembling an AT-ST foot, suggesting a world based on Star Wars would be included in the game.

=== Design ===
Sora receives an updated look for the game, having a more realistic art style. Quadratum and the non-playable characters also have a realistic design. The design team was challenged to make the world as realistic as possible; previously in the series, the most "realistic" world was the one based on the Pirates of the Caribbean films. Conversely, characters in the original world of the series, such as Donald and Goofy, continue to use the shaders and designs introduced in Kingdom Hearts III, with Nomura stating if Sora were to return to his world, his look would revert.

=== Audio ===
==== Music ====
Series composer Yoko Shimomura returns to score the game.

==== Voice cast ====
By the end of August 2026, the game's English voice acting was around 70 percent complete, while the Japanese voice acting had been finished. Haley Joel Osment returned to voice Sora in the English version, while David Gallagher returned as Riku. Benjamin Bratt reprises his role as Ernesto de la Cruz in the game.

== Release ==
Kingdom Hearts IV is scheduled to be released in late 2027 for Nintendo Switch 2, PlayStation 5, Windows, and Xbox Series X/S.
