= Sora (Kingdom Hearts) =

Protagonist of the Kingdom Hearts video games

- Kingdom Hearts character
- Sora as he appears in Kingdom Hearts and Chain of Memories by Tetsuya Nomura
- First game: Kingdom Hearts (2002)
- Created by: Tetsuya Nomura
- Designed by: Tetsuya Nomura
- Voiced by: Japanese; Miyu Irino; Takuto Yoshinaga (young); English; Haley Joel Osment; Luke Manriquez (young)

In-universe information
- Weapon: Keyblade
- Home: Destiny Islands

Sora (Japanese: ソラ) is a character and the main protagonist of Disney and Square Enix's Kingdom Hearts video game series. Introduced in the first Kingdom Hearts game in 2002, Sora is portrayed as a cheerful teenager who lives on the Destiny Islands and has been best friends with Riku and Kairi since childhood. While planning to leave on a journey to see other worlds, they are separated after creatures known as the Heartless destroy the Islands, with Sora obtaining a weapon called the Keyblade. Donald Duck and Goofy recruit him in their journey across various worlds in search of their king, Mickey Mouse, while Sora searches for his friends; along the way, the trio protects the worlds they visit from the Heartless and other villains.

Sora was initially designed by Kingdom Hearts series director and character designer Tetsuya Nomura during a discussion between Disney and Square about who the series' protagonist should be. Wanting an original character, Nomura made various sketches of Sora until the design met the approval of Disney. Throughout the series, Sora has been voiced by Haley Joel Osment in English and Miyu Irino in Japanese. For his depiction as a child in the prequel Kingdom Hearts Birth by Sleep, Sora was voiced by Luke Manriquez and Takuto Yoshinaga in English and Japanese, respectively. Sora has made supporting appearances in other games from the series and reprised his role in manga and light novel adaptations of the games.

Sora's character has received a generally positive critical response due to his warm personality and adventurous spirit. His personal and martial growth in the series has also received praise, especially in his appearance in Kingdom Hearts II. He was added to Nintendo's fighting video game Super Smash Bros. Ultimate as a downloadable fighter and revealed to be the most requested fighter to appear in the Super Smash Bros. series.

== Concept and creation ==
Sora was created by Tetsuya Nomura as the protagonist of Kingdom Hearts. He was not originally slated to be the protagonist, as Disney wanted Donald Duck to fill the role, while Square wanted Mickey Mouse. Because Sora was a new character in the first Kingdom Hearts, Square added Final Fantasy characters who support the protagonist. Nomura has stated that Sora's name can be interpreted as "sky", since the Japanese word sora (空) means sky. This name was chosen to symbolize Sora's role and his personality, as well as his close relationship with Riku and Kairi, with their names together meaning "sky, land, and sea." He was also described by Nomura as having an outgoing personality, which allows him to make friends throughout the series.

One of the main concepts of Sora's character in the series is that, according to Nomura, he is a normal boy instead of a supernatural being, despite being deeply connected with other characters from the series. With Sora, Nomura wants to give players the message that, though they are not "important people", they have the opportunity to accomplish great things. This was emphasized in Birth by Sleep's secret ending, which Nomura hoped players would find because it showed Sora's potential to influence others' lives. In early versions of development of Birth by Sleep, Nomura thought that Ventus would be Sora before being reborn, but due to negative feedback from overseas, this plot line was discarded. Of all of the characters he has designed, Nomura called Sora his favorite, describing him as "special" after having worked to develop the character over many games. The name of Noctis Lucis Caelum from Final Fantasy XV is also a reference to Sora; Sora and Caelum both mean "sky" in their respective languages, and Nomura considered Noctis to be his latest "son". When Kingdom Hearts II included a note using Sora's handwriting, Nomura wrote it himself. In response to rumors saying that Sora's story would end in Kingdom Hearts III, Nomura answered that Sora is the protagonist of the series and that his role will end once the series ends.

According to Super Smash Bros. series director Masahiro Sakurai, Sora had been the winner of the Super Smash Bros. for 3DS and Wii U Fighter Ballot in 2015, and Sakurai was aware of the various fan campaigns advocating for Sora's inclusion in the series. Sakurai described Sora's inclusion as a "huge undertaking" and "perfect" as the concluding fighter for Super Smash Bros. Ultimate. Sakurai also felt that it was "impossible" for Sora to appear in the series, but after Sakurai met a Disney executive at an awards show, Nintendo, Disney, and Square Enix began negotiations to include him. According to Luigi Priore, Vice President of Disney and Pixar Games, the company recognized that having Sora in Smash Bros. was something that fans had been asking for a long time, and the team was delighted to make it happen. "Knowing the passion of Kingdom Hearts fans, we were not surprised [by the reaction], but we were thrilled," Priore added. "It's been incredible watching all the videos and commentary online." Nomura was actually more hesitant than Disney about Sora's inclusion because of potential conflicts with the lore established in the Kingdom Hearts series at first, but seeing the positive reception by the public led him to conclude that "the end result was really great." Sora was designed as a floaty, light, and aerial fighter. The majority of his moves are inspired by his appearance in the original Kingdom Hearts, but per the limitations of the licensing agreement, Disney characters were not included as spirits or cameos.

=== Design ===
Concept artwork of Sora by Tetsuya Nomura

Nomura designed Sora with the concepts of the Disney characters in mind, basing his outfit on Mickey Mouse's trademark white gloves, red shorts, and giant yellow shoes. Sora originally wielded a weapon resembling a chainsaw; however, the weapon was not well received by Disney, which led Nomura to redesign the weapon into a Keyblade. He was also designed with lion-like features, which were removed as the staff found them to be similar to those of Final Fantasy IX protagonist Zidane Tribal. The design was further reworked after a talk with the Disney staff, and Nomura finished it after a night's work.

Following the first Kingdom Hearts, Nomura was worried that players would be unhappy that Sora would start Kingdom Hearts II as a weak character with few powers, who once again had to be leveled up like the first game. Therefore, Nomura developed the plot of Chain of Memories to explain how Sora loses his abilities in Castle Oblivion and starts anew. Additionally, a new mystery regarding Sora's memories of Twilight Town was added in Chain of Memories, which would be explained in Kingdom Hearts II.

Sora was given a new outfit to reflect the time spent between Kingdom Hearts and Kingdom Hearts II. The team in charge of Kingdom Hearts II expressed difficulties in animating Sora's "Valor" Drive Form, which had a different motion except for Sora's walking animation, which is shared with his regular motion. The Anti-Form was also made to focus on Sora's dark side from the first Kingdom Hearts, where he is temporarily transformed into a Heartless. Gameplay-wise, the form was created to be both powerful and troublesome. The fights Sora has with Roxas and Xemnas were meant to surprise gamers, especially in the latter, when the player loses control of Sora and Riku has to save him. To avoid misconceptions that Dream Drop Distance was a remake of the original game, Nomura decided to change Sora's and Riku's outfits for most of the game.

Following Chain of Memories, Tetsuya Nomura started designing new outfits for Sora for new installments featuring him including Kingdom Hearts II (left), Dream Drop Distance (middle) and Kingdom Hearts III (right). Renders are from Super Smash Bros. Ultimate.

After finishing Kingdom Hearts II, Nomura wanted to give Sora a rest from the series to focus following games on other characters from the series. Moreover, the events from the endings of Kingdom Hearts Coded and Birth by Sleep hinted at a new mystery regarding Sora's character, which would be revealed in Kingdom Hearts III. Although Nomura stated in March 2010 that Sora would once again be the focus of the next title, Kingdom Hearts 3D: Dream Drop Distance, he stated that Sora would share it with another character with great importance. The switches between player characters Sora and Riku across the game are meant to contrast the style from Kingdom Hearts Birth By Sleep, which allowed the player to use three characters in their own campaigns, as well as to explain the word "Distance" in the title, because Sora and Riku never interact across their stories. Nomura has stated that the themes of the game are trust and friendship, and that, like Birth by Sleep, the story is on par with that of a numbered title. As a result of the game's plot, both Sora and Riku appear in their younger forms from the first Kingdom Hearts game.

For Kingdom Hearts III, Nomura was interested in giving Sora a new outfit, but was worried about doing so because of the popularity of the character's Kingdom Hearts II outfit. In the end, he decided to create a new one, as Kingdom Hearts III was a new numbered title. Nomura also revealed that Sora had the same proportions as in previous games; however, they "muted the volume on his hair—it's not as wild." Regarding updating Sora's look from his Kingdom Hearts II design, Nomura noted that the basis for the resulting design is a mix between Sora's costumes for Kingdom Hearts II and Dream Drop Distance, one that is "a lot more sleek and sporty" since "Sora does a lot more... acrobatic [and]... action-oriented movements". Sora's new skills in Kingdom Hearts III were inspired by those of Terra from Kingdom Hearts II Final Mix and Birth by Sleep in order to surprise gamers with new powers related to the Keyblade, with other skills that were influenced by Sora's and Riku's powers from Dream Drop Distance. For the Monsters Inc. world, Nomura considered giving Sora a monster costume similar to the one Boo wears in the film, but Pixar gave the idea to have Sora transform into a monster. Sora's final stage in Kingdom Hearts III was left ambiguous, though Nomura suggested that it might be related to the Square Enix game The World Ends with You.

In April 2022, during an interview with Famitsu, Nomura said that "Kingdom Hearts IV will explore the contrast between the real world known as Quadratum and the fictional worlds of Kingdom Hearts". He further said that "Sora also looks more realistic due to him being in that world. However, if he were to return to his own world, his appearance would look similar to [how he would look with] the shaders used for Donald and Goofy."

=== Casting ===
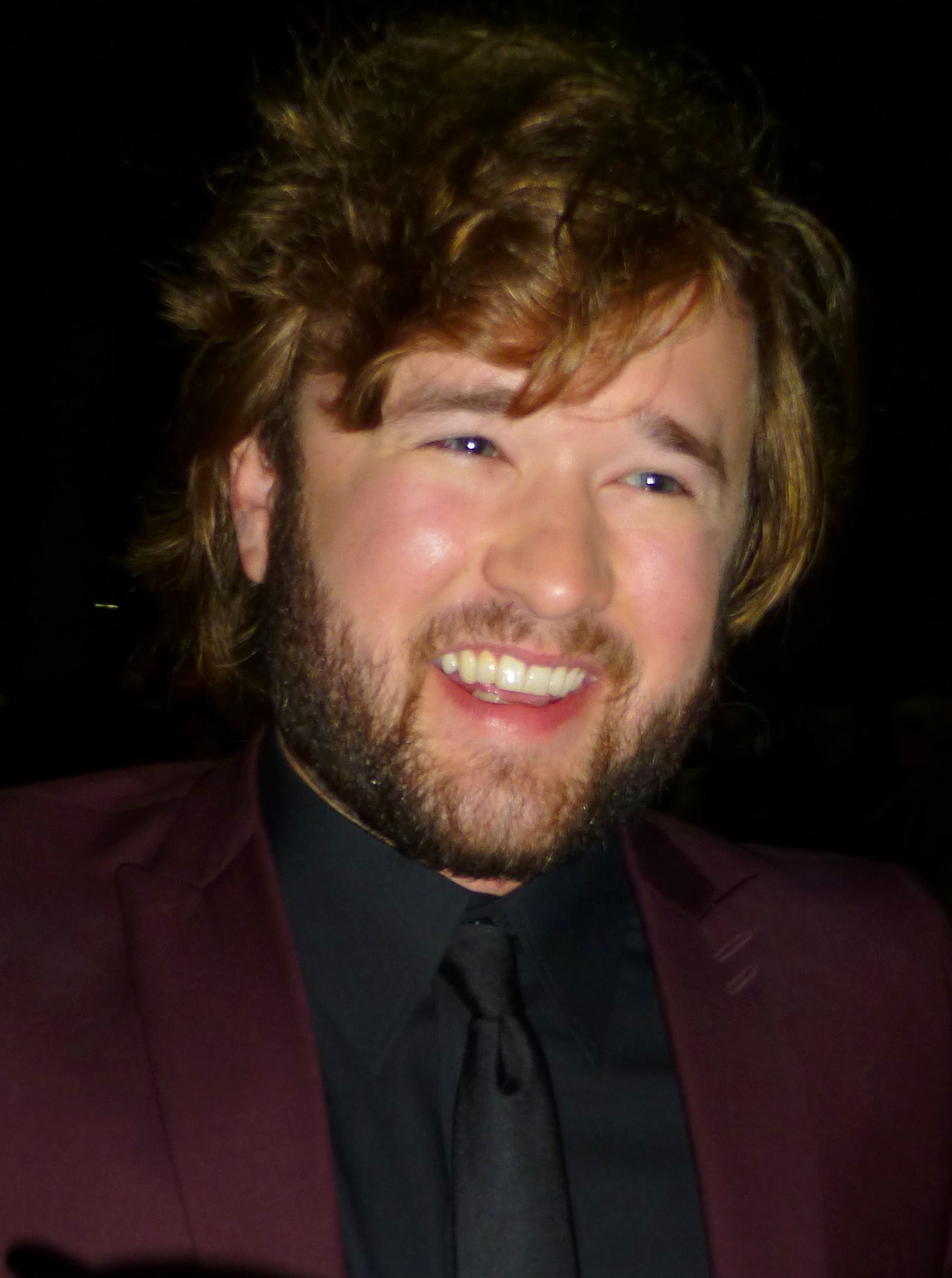
Haley Joel Osment voices Sora in the English version of the series.

Sora is voiced in Japanese by Miyu Irino, who used his normal voice for the beginning; Irino was filmed with cameras during voice recording to provide a reference for Sora's mouth movements. As Irino grew older, he struggled with sounding as young as Sora, who remained the same in Re:coded as his data form. By Kingdom Hearts III, Irino faced more issues during recordings of the game. After finishing the game, Irino wondered if he might properly portray Sora in sequels due to his age gap.

In English, the character is voiced by Haley Joel Osment. Due to Sora's lack of growth across the franchise, Osment faced the challenge of properly giving him the tone of a teenager; "I think he's a little bit older now [in Kingdom Hearts 3] than he was in Kingdom Hearts 1 and 2. But early on, you know, I started this when I was 12, and my voice had started to change and everything. So learning how to manipulate that and keep the voice sounding young while still preserving the range of emotions that Sora had; that was a unique challenge." In retrospect, Osment found the idea of ending Kingdom Hearts III as an emotional moment as, while the series is not ending with this installment, the narrative is giving a proper closure to the story started by the antagonist Xehanort.

There have also been comments with Osment being praised by the media. Gaming Target's Matt Swidder mentioned Osment "makes a perfect fit for Sora". On the other hand, Osment's work in Re:Chain of Memories was noted to have made a poor impact in his portrayal as Sora, as he no longer sounds like he did in the original Kingdom Hearts game. Louis Bedigian from GameZone remarked on Osment's continuous work in the sequel Kingdom Hearts II. RPGamer still praised Osment's performance in the game, finding him suitable for the protagonist. Koinya lamented that Miyu Irino's work was never made available for the Western audience, considering him talented alongside Mamoru Miyano (Riku).

== Characteristics ==
Sora appears as a boy with spiky brown hair who, when first introduced, wears a red shirt, red pants, and a white and blue jacket covered by keychains. Upon traveling to certain worlds, Sora's appearance is altered by Donald Duck's magic to adapt to different environments and keep his origin from another world a secret; for example, he turns into a merman in Atlantica. After undergoing significant growth in Kingdom Hearts II, Sora is provided with a new, black outfit by Flora, Fauna, and Merryweather. When battling, Sora's outfit can change into other designs depending on the player's choices. The primary form of Sora's Keyblade is the Kingdom Key (キングダムチェーン, Kingudamu Chēn; lit. "Kingdom Chain"), but through the use of in-game keychains, the Keyblade can assume various unique forms. During Kingdom Hearts II, Sora dual-wields Keyblades, with their forms depending on the player's use of keychains.

Across the series, Sora is depicted as a cheerful teenager who cherishes his friendships and relies on them for his strength. As a result, several of Sora's enemies use his friends as bait to use the Keyblade for their purposes. During the first game, it is discovered that Sora was not meant to wield the Keyblade, which only chooses him in the absence of its intended owner, Riku. However, Sora's greater strength of heart causes the Keyblade to reject Riku in favor of Sora.

== Appearances ==
=== In Kingdom Hearts series ===
In Kingdom Hearts, Sora, Riku, and Kairi plan to leave their home of the Destiny Islands to explore new worlds. They are separated when the island is attacked by the Heartless; in the process, Sora obtains a Keyblade, which he uses to eliminate the Heartless. Arriving in Traverse Town, Sora allies with Donald Duck and Goofy, who are under instruction from their missing king, Mickey Mouse, to follow the "key". The three travel across worlds in their Gummi Ship in search of their missing friends, sealing the worlds' Keyholes to protect them from being consumed by the Heartless. They are opposed by an alliance of Disney villains led by Maleficent, who seeks the seven Princesses of Heart to unlock the Keyhole that leads to Kingdom Hearts, a repository of knowledge and power, and the source of all hearts. Riku, who has fallen under Maleficent's influence, fights Sora on several occasions under the belief that he has replaced him with new friends. As the group travels to Hollow Bastion and defeat Maleficent, Riku is possessed by Ansem, Seeker of Darkness, who reveals that Kairi's heart is in Sora's body. To save Kairi, Sora impales himself with Ansem's Keyblade, briefly transforming him into a Shadow Heartless before Kairi restores Sora to human form. After taking Kairi to safety, Sora, Donald, and Goofy defeat Ansem at the open door to Kingdom Hearts. From inside the door, Mickey and Riku help Sora and his friends close it to prevent the Heartless within from escaping, with Mickey and Sora using their Keyblades to lock the door. Separated from their friends again, Sora, Donald, and Goofy continue their quest to reunite with Riku and Mickey.

In Kingdom Hearts: Chain of Memories, the three stumble upon the fortress of Castle Oblivion, where Organization XIII forces Naminé to manipulate their memories to enslave Sora. After they defeat the Organization members controlling the castle, Naminé helps restore their memories to their state prior to entering Castle Oblivion, at the cost of their memories of the events in the castle. This requires them to sleep in the castle for the restoration of memories to be completed.

In Kingdom Hearts II, Sora reawakens along with Donald and Goofy in Twilight Town once his Nobody, Roxas, merges with him. They visit Mickey's master, Yen Sid, from whom they are reacquainted with Organization XIII. Sora embarks with Donald and Goofy to find Riku and Mickey, traversing new and unfamiliar worlds to eliminate the threat of the remaining Heartless, Nobodies, and local villains. Learning that the Organization has abducted Kairi to force Sora to gather more hearts for them, Sora's group rejoins Mickey and arrives at the Organization's fortress in the World That Never Was, where they reunite with Kairi and Riku. After being separated from the others, Sora and Riku defeat Xemnas, after which a doorway appears that allows them to reunite with their friends on the Destiny Islands.

Sora makes a minor appearance in Kingdom Hearts 358/2 Days, which mainly takes place while he sleeps to recover his lost memories from the events of Chain of Memories; it is also revealed that Xion, who was created by Organization XIII using Sora's memories, inadvertently hinders the restoration process until she joins with him. In Kingdom Hearts Coded, a computer program based on Sora's likeness serves as the primary protagonist of the game, traversing a datascape based on the contents of Jiminy Cricket's journal to uncover the truth behind a mysterious message left in it. A four-year-old Sora appears in the prequel, Kingdom Hearts Birth by Sleep. After Ventus' heart is separated from his body following a confrontation with Vanitas, it encounters Sora, who accepts it into his own heart. In the game's secret ending, set after the events of Kingdom Hearts II, Ansem the Wise tells Aqua about Sora's adventures, and how he may help all the people connected to him. In the final scene, Sora decides to save them after reading Mickey's letter.

In Kingdom Hearts 3D: Dream Drop Distance, Sora and Riku undertake the Mark of Mastery exam in preparation for Xehanort's return. The two are sent to awaken the Sleeping Worlds, worlds which remained in a state of sleep after the defeat of Ansem. Sora is lured into a deep slumber by Xehanort's incarnations, who plan to turn him into a vessel for Xehanort's heart. Riku and his friends save Sora and bring him back to Yen Sid's tower, where Riku dives into Sora's heart and awakens him. Because of Sora's failure, he does not achieve the rank of Keyblade Master. In the ending of Kingdom Hearts 0.2 Birth by Sleep – A Fragmentary Passage, Sid reveals that Sora has lost most of his powers as a consequence of Xehanort's attempted possession and advises him to seek out Hercules, who has gone through a similar experience.

In Kingdom Hearts III, Sora goes on a journey to regain his strength, particularly the "power of waking" (眠りし心を解放する力, Nemurishi Kokoro wo Kaihō-suru Chikara; lit. "Power to free a sleeping heart) required to restore the hearts of Ventus, Aqua, and Terra, while also looking for an opportunity to restore Roxas. During his adventure, Sora fights Xehanort and the thirteen seekers from the new Organization XIII. Although Sora's missions end in failures, upon finding Vanitas' body, he manages to properly use the power of waking and restore Ventus. Sora and the other Keyblade wielders go to the Keyblade Graveyard to fight Xehanort, but are nearly killed by Heartless. After being restored by Naminé, Sora, with Kairi's help, uses the power of waking to give his friends another chance. After their return to the Graveyard, Sora manages to restore Terra and defeat the Organization with the group. However, Xehanort kills Kairi, causing Sora to confront him in his hometown of Scala ad Caelum. There, he defeats Xehanort, who accepts defeat and departs to the afterlife with Eraqus, giving Sora his χ-blade. Sora uses the power of waking to restore Kairi despite learning the risks of its overuse, causing him to fade from existence.

In the aftermath, as depicted in the Kingdom Hearts III Re Mind DLC, Sora ends up in the Final World, where Yozora attacks him, claiming that he was sent to save him. The two end up in a different world, Quadratum, where they fight and Sora emerges victorious; if defeated, he transforms into a crystal statue. In Kingdom Hearts: Melody of Memory, Kairi recalls Sora's adventures in a dream world within her heart to search for clues for his whereabouts. Towards the end of her dream, Kairi confronts an illusion of Xehanort, who nearly overpowers her until Sora remotely takes control of her body and defeats him.

A 2D avatar version of Sora wearing his original outfit in Kingdom Hearts appears in the online community-based social gaming networking service, Kingdom Hearts Mobile.

In the Kingdom Hearts IV trailer, Sora is seen living in an apartment in Quadratum. He is greeted by Strelitzia, who has also come to reside in Quadratum and was believed to have been killed by the Darkness-possessed Ventus in Kingdom Hearts χ.

=== Other appearances ===
Outside Kingdom Hearts, Sora appeared as free limited-time downloadable content in the Final Fantasy crossover game World of Final Fantasy in January 2017. In 2019, Sora appeared in the mobile game Disney Emoji Blitz to commemorate the release of Kingdom Hearts III. Sora appears as a playable fighter in the Nintendo Switch crossover fighting game Super Smash Bros. Ultimate via downloadable content, which was released on 18 October 2021. In September 2026, three different Sora skins was added into Fortnite as part of the game's Kingdom Hearts collaboration, one for each main numerical entry of the games.

Sora also appears in various Kingdom Hearts media adaptations, including a manga series written by Shiro Amano and a series of novels by Tomoko Kanemaki, which adapt his role in the video games. In a collaboration between Square Enix and Japanese fashion brand SuperGroupies, Sora's image was used to create clothing based on his design from Kingdom Hearts III.

== Reception ==
=== Popularity ===
Sora's character was well received by gaming media. Magazines have called him one of the best and most iconic characters in video games. In an ASCII Media Works poll in which fans voted which video game or manga character they would like to name their children after, Sora's name was second in the male category. Chris Penwell of PlayStation LifeStyle named Sora as his favorite character for having "a relatable personality." Sora has the most appearances as a hero in Square Enix RPGs, according to Guinness World Records' "The records held by Gamer's Edition 2020 cover characters".

Various types of merchandising have been released based on Sora's character. There are several types of action figures which show Sora with different appearances such as his original form, the Kingdom Hearts II design and other variants. Other accessories has also been released. In 2022, Square Enix also made a tote bag and tamagotchi, depicting Sora.

=== Critical response ===
Sora's Kingdom Hearts IV design has divided fans for looking more realistic than his previous looks which were often seen as cartoony and highly popular in cosplayers

Critics have generally praised Sora. When Sora was first revealed in 2002, GameSpot's Giancarlo Varanini regarded him as "an appropriate amalgamation of the Square and Disney universes." He also comically noted that Sora "doesn't look like much, but you know how it goes." IGN praised Sora's resilient character, noting how such an ordinary "youngster" could face up to his challenges during his adventures for the sake of friendship, while RPGFan's Nicole Monet Kirk labelled him as an "extremely likable hero". Despite Sora's childish traits, USGamer believed his character takes a more serious attitude in the first game in Hollow Bastion when confronting Riku and other bosses as Sora becomes chosen by the Keyblade despite Riku being revealed as the chosen warrior. Sora also received negative comments regarding his characterization. Sora was listed the fourth "biggest dork" of 2006 by Game Informer, citing the Atlantica singing portions of the second main game.

In their article "Kingdom Hearts III: The IGN Concept", they stated that in order to make his role in a future sequel more entertaining, he would need more development making him "be confident, collected and committed to the tasks at hand". Also commenting on his role in a future sequel, GamesRadar stated that having Sora's character be older would be necessary to make the story more mature. With the end of Re Mind, GameInformer said Sora's characterization has been poor as he does not really go through a character arc despite appearing in several games to the point he is still a comic relief comparable to Ash Ketchum from Pokémon and thus wanted him to be portrayed like Ichiban Kasuga from Yakuza: Like a Dragon due to their similarities in personalites. Instead, Riku comes across as a more developed protagonist, but as a result of tragedy which he does not want Sora to undergo. Sora's fate in the ending was the subject of analysis due to his apparent death after saving Kairi to the point GameRevolution stated that Kingdom Hearts III did not give the audience the happy ending they expected despite ending Xehanort's arc.

Sora's design in Kingdom Hearts IV received multiple responses for looking older and more realistic than in previous installments. Upon the reveal of the first Kingdom Hearts IV trailer during April 2022, Polygon noted that there were several fans of the character wanting to know the location of Sora's apartment from the world of Quadratum, which is heavily based on Shibuya, Japan. This led to the discovery that it was in the Regno Raffine building of Aoyama, Tokyo, which Polygon found wealthy for the idea of Sora living there. Sora's new shoes were also shown, and fans had mixed reactions to them and the loss of his original, clown-like shoes. GameRant said fans were divided because Sora looked less cartoony something which cosplayers used to pay attention to. The revelation of the realistic Sora divided players over his overhaul and wondered whether he will look cartoony again if he appears in other stages.

Some journalists commented on Sora's relationships. In retrospect, Paste Magazine found Sora's story and links with his two similar other selves, Roxas and Ventus, to be confusing more than Solid Snake's relationships with his other rivals who were cloned from Big Boss in Metal Gear. 1UP.com criticized his relationship with Riku and Kairi, finding him to be less popular than the Disney characters featured in the series. TheGamer praised how across the series Sora and Riku's relationship improves, with GamesRadar stating this resulted in fans shipping them while ignoring Sora and Kairi's relationship. Critics panned the relationship between Sora and Kairi, criticizing the latter's continued role as a damsel in distress to be rescued by the former, rather than an ally.

Sora was a popular choice for inclusion in the Super Smash Bros. roster among fans and numerous websites, including GamingBolt, Shacknews, IGN, and Siliconera; although Jeremy Winslow of Kotaku opposed him because the roster already included too many sword-wielding characters, he later admitted that Sora was "kinda cool". Kyle Campbell of USA Today and Wesley LeBlanc of Game Informer both praised the character's inclusion, stating that Sora's addition "is a big deal" and "perfect".

=== Characterization and themes ===
In an article for Journal of Cinema and Media Studies, Sora is labeled as a character that belongs to Disney despite Nomura being the actual creator. As Nomura enjoyed the character he created, he had mixed feelings since his works were overseen by other developers in charge of the game especially in order to fit other related IPs coming across as the Mukokuseki concept. Sora's original design was noted both of Caucasian and anime archetype. Meanwhile, his original outfit was noted to be a modern attire due to the multiple accessories it includes like zippers. While initially coming across as a blank state, Sora undergoes a transformation in parallels to the Dragon Quest protagonists who are developed so that the player can see themselves in them. In "Conspiratorial hermeneutics and metareflexive depictions of fan practices in the Kingdom Hearts", Sora's weapon was noted to be fitting of franchise. The characters' constant transformations when reaching new worlds, made Sora's original anime-like design to feel more noticeable as a result of how he often does not fit with realistic worlds which has been compared with cosplay. In regards to his debut, Sora's journey in Disney worlds was seen as a pretension to fuse Western elements with Japanese narratives. Sora was also compared to Goethe's Wilhelm Meister's Apprenticeship which also comes across as Sora's own coming-of-age story. Sora's growth is seen thanks to his important place in the story where he has to make serious decisions involving beings that rely on either both light and dark elements. to the point of coming across as a Bildungsroman arc. Gamasutra commented on Sora's journey along the series in their feature "The Birth of Collecting: The Osiris Archetype In Games" by Jason Johnson; while comparing Sora with Isis, Johnson found Sora's adventure appealing. In "Controllers and the magic kingdom", Sora's and his friends' growth is noted for wearing darker clothing in Kingdom Hearts III as well as make the Square Enix company feel more important when Nomura's creation interacts with characters from movies in a more important way than before which was specifically noticeable for how trailers were edited.

The themes of romance, friendship and rivalry the character were also noted.GameDeveloper saw Sora and Kairi in the beginning of the series as a strong romantic relationship comparable to Disney films and Final Fantasy films but the need of producing sequel led to the lack of development. In The Kingdom's Shōnen Heart Transcultural Character Design and the JRPG, Rachael Hutchinson noted that the early characterization of Riku and Sora seems to be influenced by that of Sephiroth and Cloud Strife, respectively, in order to portray their rivalry, with Ansem taking elements from Sephiroth's appearance. Riku and Sora being forced to oppose each being caused by Kairi's weakness was compared to the sense of loss that Cloud suffers in Final Fantasy VII following Aerith's death. In "Kingdom Hearts, Territoriality and Flow", Sora is seen as a traditional Square Enix character based on his similarities with other ones also created by Nomura. However, despite his multiple journeys where Sora is told not to interfere with the world order, he is often recognized as an outsider by the people he meets, most notably in the story basead on the film The Little Mermaid. The dangers in the plot often make Sora and Riku become heroic figures at the cost of their innocence similar to the Meiji restoration that Japan faced in 1868 following the Bakumatsu conflict.

The protagonist's desire to form bonds often parallels other character in distress like Roxas' existenscial crisis in Kingdom Hearts II who wants to be himself. Furthermore, in the book "Interactive Storytelling for Video Games: A Player-Centered Approach to Creating Memorable Characters and Stories", it is noted that while Sora follows a "standard hero archetype", his character becomes more believable and strong when worrying about his friends' fates. In "Playing God: An Analysis of Video Game Religion", Roxas and his role as the 13th member of Organization XIII are compared to Christianity themes around number 13, which is considered unlucky in reference to the Last Supper before Jesus' death. The sacrifice of the thirteen Nobodies in the franchise to revive the antagonist Xehanort is compared to the devil while Roxas' death also causes the revival of Sora, who is presented similar to Jesus. Shazwin Bt. Sahmir and Norlela Ismail, in an article published by University Teknologi Mara, saw Roxas as a less conventional character due to his desire to live his life on a normal basis rather than be an adventurer like Sora. However, being forced to merge with Sora and stop existing to let him continue his journey gives Roxas a tragic end. While Sora does not undergo a notable character arc despite the game being a sequel, there are signs of Roxas having undergone one himself, encapsulated in this sentence: "In the end, after confronting Sora in his Heart Station, he gives in to the truth and become one with his true self."

== Bibliography ==
- Winslow, Jeremy (15 June 2022). "Kingdom Hearts' Director Was 'Very Picky' About Adding Sora To Smash Bros. Ultimate". Kotaku.
