= Kingdom Hearts Coded =

2008 video game

Kingdom Hearts coded
- The logo of Kingdom Hearts coded
- Developer: Square Enix
- Publisher: Square Enix
- Directors: Tetsuya Nomura; Hajime Tabata
- Producer: Kakuko Obinata
- Programmers: Manabu Mizoguchi; Naoyuki Ohashi
- Artists: Tetsuya Nomura; Koichi Akiyama
- Writers: Harunori Sakemi; Yukari Ishida; Daisuke Watanabe
- Composer: Yoko Shimomura
- Series: Kingdom Hearts
- Platform: NTT docomo
- Release: November 18, 2008: Kingdom Hearts coded DoCoMo Pre-Install Episode; JP: November 18, 2008 Episode 1; JP: June 3, 2009 Episode 2; JP: July 8, 2009 Episode 3; JP: August 5, 2009 Episode 4; JP: September 17, 2009 Episode 5; JP: October 15, 2009 Episode 6; JP: November 26, 2009 Episode 7; JP: December 26, 2009 Episode 8; JP: January 28, 2010
- Genres: Action role-playing, puzzle
- Mode: Single-player

Kingdom Hearts Coded (Note: Japanese: キングダム ハーツ コーデッド, Hepburn: Kingudamu Hātsu Kōdeddo) is an episodic action role-playing puzzle video game developed and published by Square Enix, in collaboration with Disney Interactive Studios, for mobile phones. Coded was a Japan-only release announced at the 2007 Tokyo Game Show. A Nintendo DS remake, titled Kingdom Hearts Re:coded, was released in Japan, North America, Europe, and Australia. A cinematic remake of the game was included in the Kingdom Hearts HD 2.5 Remix video game compilation for the PlayStation 3, PlayStation 4, Xbox One, Windows, and Nintendo Switch.

The gameplay is centered mostly around puzzle solving, with action role-playing elements, similar to previous Kingdom Hearts games. Mini-games and platforming are also featured, with three dimensional backgrounds and two dimensional characters. In mid-2007, game director Tetsuya Nomura decided to create a Kingdom Hearts spin-off for mobile phones that would have a different gameplay style than previous titles and allow players to explore the game like a playground. The game was originally released in eight parts and one preview to mobile phone gamers from June 2009 to January 2010. To reach a wider audience, it was remade for the Nintendo DS and released internationally.

Kingdom Hearts coded is the fourth installment in the Kingdom Hearts series and is set after Kingdom Hearts II. Jiminy Cricket's journal, chronicling Sora's fight against the Heartless and Organization XIII, is found to have two secret messages written by persons unknown, and after the journal is digitized for further analysis, the contents become corrupted. This leads King Mickey and his friends to make a digital Sora to enter and repair the journal so that the meaning of the hidden messages can be deciphered. The game received mixed reviews, with critics praising the graphics and gameplay variety, but panning the story, camera, and controls.

== Gameplay ==
Sora fighting Heartless in Traverse Town in Kingdom Hearts coded

Kingdom Hearts coded is a puzzle game with action elements mixed into the gameplay, which is similar to the action-RPG style of the previous titles in the series. It also features a similar interface with fight, item, and "magic" in the command window. There are also minigame and platforming elements. The game features a mix of different graphic styles, with three-dimensional backgrounds and two-dimensional characters. The initial trailer showcased the main character, Sora, in dungeons with floating red and black blocks. Battles feature a "debugging" mode to remove the blocks and progress towards enemies. Blocks are also used to solve puzzles or reach higher ground.

Kingdom Hearts Re:coded has an added system to incorporate multiplayer experiences called "tag mode". If other Nintendo DS players are nearby, they do not need to be playing the game and they will be registered in the game as "ghosts".

== Plot ==
=== Setting ===
The game is set after Kingdom Hearts II and follows the story of Jiminy Cricket, King Mickey, Donald Duck, and Goofy in Disney Castle. In the game, players progress through a series of levels which are virtual representations of worlds contained within the digitized version of Jiminy's journal from the first Kingdom Hearts game, and are arranged according to the order in which Sora visited the worlds originally in Kingdom Hearts. These virtual worlds are based on various locales from many Disney animated films as well as original worlds seen in the first game of the series, including Destiny Islands, Traverse Town, Wonderland (Alice in Wonderland), Olympus Coliseum (Hercules), Agrabah (Aladdin), and Hollow Bastion. Castle Oblivion also appears as the game's final level.

=== Characters ===
Artwork of the cast of Kingdom Hearts coded. (From left to right) (bottom row) Donald Duck, King Mickey, Jiminy Cricket, Goofy (middle row) Kairi, Sora, Riku (top row) Roxas

The main protagonist and sole player character of the game is an artificially intelligent virtual avatar of Sora, occasionally referred to in-game as "Data-Sora", created from the data from Jiminy's journal entries. Because the game's setting is based on the first game, Data-Sora resembles the original Sora in his attire from the same game. Three other original Kingdom Hearts characters—Riku, Naminé, and Roxas—similarly appear as virtual avatars. Like previous Kingdom Hearts titles, coded features numerous Disney and Final Fantasy characters who have appeared in the first game. Some characters include King Mickey, Pluto, Jiminy Cricket, Donald Duck, and Goofy, the latter two of whom appear as computer-controlled partners of Sora in one of the game's levels. The main antagonists of the game are software bugs that corrupt the data of Jiminy's journal and Heartless that Sora encounters in the first game. Recurring series antagonists Maleficent and Pete also appear.

=== Story ===
Jiminy Cricket organizes his journals chronicling Sora's journeys when he discovers a line he does not remember writing: "We must return to free them from their torment." (Note: Rewritten as "Their hurting will be mended when you return to end it" in Re:coded) King Mickey digitizes the contents of the journal to investigate the message, only to find the datascape has been corrupted with bugs that take the form of red-and-black blocks. Mickey creates a virtual Sora named "Data-Sora" to guide him through the datascape's multiple worlds and debug the journal by destroying the blocks and digitized Heartless that appear.

While this happens, Mickey, Donald, Goofy, and Jiminy are imported into the datascape by an avatar of the journal's uncorrupted data, which takes the form of a virtual Riku, to assist Sora in debugging the journal. They discover that Pete and Maleficent have also entered the datascape to use it in their latest attempt at world domination. After Sora makes significant headway into his mission, Maleficent destroys his Keyblade and kidnaps Riku, but he continues through the datascape with the help of Donald and Goofy until he regains the ability to conjure the Keyblade.

Atop Hollow Bastion, Pete infects Riku's code with bugs and forces him to fight Sora, endangering the datascape. Seeing no alternative, Sora chooses to debug Riku from inside, which would cause everything in the datascape to reset, including his own memories. The debugging process also activates the bug responsible for the data's corruption, which takes the form of Sora's Heartless. Sora destroys the bug while Mickey and the others are returned to their world by Riku before the reset occurs.

With the journal debugged, Riku uncovers extra data that contains the secret to the journal's message. Mickey guides the reset Sora to an extra world based on Castle Oblivion, where he is tested by a virtual Roxas to endure the pain of forgetting his friends. Sora defeats Roxas and is allowed access to the deepest portion of the data. There he and Mickey encounter a virtual Naminé, who reveals that the real Naminé left the message after discovering a set of memories relating to people tied to Sora's heart—herself, Roxas, Axel, Xion, Terra, Aqua, and Ventus—while restoring his lost memories; the bugs are also revealed to have been an unintentional side effect of her message. Before disappearing, Naminé explains that it is the real Sora's duty to save these people. Mickey relays this message to the real Sora through a bottled letter. (Note: As depicted in Kingdom Hearts II)

In a secret ending exclusive to Re:coded, Mickey and Yen Sid discuss the location of Terra, Aqua, and Ventus. During their conversation, Yen Sid reveals that the destruction of Xehanort's Heartless and Nobody—Ansem and Xemnas—will result in Xehanort's resurrection. To prepare for this threat, Yen Sid orders Mickey to bring Sora and Riku to him, intending to examine them for the Mark of Mastery. In a secret ending exclusive to the HD 2.5 ReMIX cinematic version, Braig discusses Xehanort's plan with Xehanort's time-traveling younger self before asking which of Organization XIII's other restored members he should take with them.

== Episodes ==
Kingdom Hearts coded consists of eight episodes, released monthly between June 2009 and January 2010, as well as a preview episode released November 2008.

Episode	Date	Ref.
Preview episode	November 18, 2008	
1. Destiny Islands	June 3, 2009	
2. Traverse Town	July 8, 2009	
3. Wonderland	August 5, 2009	
4. Olympus Coliseum	September 17, 2009	
5. Agrabah	October 15, 2009	
6. Hollow Bastion - Former	November 26, 2009	
7. Hollow Bastion - Latter	December 26, 2009	
8. Castle Oblivion	January 28, 2010	

== Development ==
In mid-2007, Nomura mentioned a desire to create a spin-off Kingdom Hearts game on a mobile platform and wanted it to play slightly different than other titles in the series. The game's concept was devised by Nomura, who wanted to make the game feel like a "playground" for fans. Co-director Hajime Tabata originally thought the plan was terrible, but still interesting.

The story was initially supposed to be "fluid" and did not fit into the chronology of the Kingdom Hearts series, but later developers tied the game's final chapters into Kingdom Hearts Birth by Sleep and Kingdom Hearts 358/2 Days. The development team planned to make use of mobile phones communication abilities to facilitate interaction between players. Coded was developed with 3D and 2D graphics to have the game available on a range of mobile phones for distribution overseas. The game was designed around hardware that was more powerful than any yet available, like Final Fantasy Agito, but developer were not as aggressive with this boundary-pushing with Coded to help it spread to overseas markets where mobile hardware was not as powerful. Early screenshots showed the game in a wide screen format, based on the idea that more future models will feature a swivel screen. Few mobile phones, however, were able to support the game's technical specifications, so the planned expansion to other Japanese phone carriers and to the United States were not possible.

Coded was announced alongside Birth by Sleep and 358/2 Days at the Tokyo Game Show on September 20, 2007, where a trailer was shown in a photo-prohibited theater. New trailers were shown at the 2008 Jump Festa in December 2007 and the DKΣ3713 Private party in August 2008. Playable demonstrations, as well as new trailers, were available at the 2008 Tokyo Game Show in October 2008 and the 2009 Jump Festa in December 2008. Early trailers highlighted coded's gameplay, while later ones focused more on the game's story, which would fill in some plotholes present in the first Kingdom Hearts game.

Coded was first released pre-installed on the Docomo PRIME Series "P-01A" mobile phone. Because many mobile games offer free content, Nomura planned to try a new business model from Square Enix's usual practice to lower barriers to entry. Included on the phone was an online mobile phone portal called Kingdom Hearts Mobile which allowed users to create avatars and play minigames. As mobile phone technology improved, the development team planned on adding online gameplay. The game was discontinued for download on Japanese mobile phones on April 30, 2013.

=== Kingdom Hearts Re:coded ===
Kingdom Hearts: Re:coded
- North American box art
- Developer: h.a.n.d.
- Publisher: Square Enix
- Director: Tetsuya Nomura
- Producer: Yoichi Yoshimoto
- Artist: Tetsuya Nomura
- Composer: Yoko Shimomura
- Series: Kingdom Hearts
- Platform: Nintendo DS
- Release: JP: October 7, 2010; NA: January 11, 2011; AU: January 13, 2011; EU: January 14, 2011
- Genre: Action role-playing
- Mode: Single-player

In May 2010, the new English voice actor for Jiminy Cricket, Phil Snyder, who took over the role after the death of Jiminy's former voice actor Eddie Carroll, wrote on his official website that he was recording his first voice work for the game Kingdom Hearts Re:coded; it was speculated to be a remake of Coded in the same way Kingdom Hearts Re:Chain of Memories brought Kingdom Hearts: Chain of Memories to the PlayStation 2. However, it remained unconfirmed until Re:coded was presented at E3 2010.

Game director Tetsuya Nomura wanted to re-release Kingdom Hearts: coded, and considered releasing the game on the Wii through the WiiWare digital game store, which would then allow players to download the game in chapters like on the mobile phones' original version. Nomura's prime reason for wanting to re-release the game was to reach a broader audience however, so the Nintendo DS, being the most popular portable video game system in America and Europe, was chosen. The development team originally planned on simply re-releasing the game, but after they selected software developer h.a.n.d., who had done an "excellent" conversion of 358/2 Days, they began to consider a remake. At first, Nomura asked for an "as is" recreation of the original game, and when the game cartridge was still not full, he asked for a full 3D remake. Development took almost a year, and h.a.n.d. told Nomura that the task was "nearly impossible". The scale of the game grew so large that the Square Enix team in Osaka that had worked on Kingdom Hearts Birth by Sleep was brought in to assist.

The lower screen of the Nintendo DS was used for the gameplay panel like 358/2 Days. The gameplay mechanics of the game were completely changed from the original: the lack of an analogue control stick on the Nintendo DS was a "challenge" according to Nomura, leading to a simplified combat system and mechanics that borrowed from Birth by Sleep. The story of the remake did not change, although more scenes were added, including a new secret movie and a few hints about the then-unreleased Kingdom Hearts 3D: Dream Drop Distance. Gameplay elements from other titles in the series were also used, including the leveling system from 358/2 Days, and the random encounter system from Kingdom Hearts Mobile. The game was released in Japan on October 7, 2010, North America on January 11, 2011, Australia on January 13, 2011, and Europe on January 14, 2011.

=== Kingdom Hearts HD 2.5 Remix ===
In the credits of HD 1.5 Remix, clips of Kingdom Hearts Re:coded were shown, hinting at its inclusion in another collection. On October 14, 2013, Square Enix announced that Re:coded would be part of the Kingdom Hearts HD 2.5 Remix collection, released exclusively on the PlayStation 3. Due to the game's touch screen use on the Nintendo DS, console conversion was ruled out as it would necessitate a full remake. Two additional hours of cinematics were created for the game to cover the entire story and show the game's connections to other Kingdom Hearts titles. The collection features the game as HD cinematics, much like 358/2 Days was in the HD 1.5 Remix collection. The collection also includes both Kingdom Hearts II Final Mix and Kingdom Hearts Birth by Sleep Final Mix in HD and with added trophy support. Additional events occur in the cinematic scenes not seen in the original, with new voice acting, orchestrated audio, new battle scenes, and a scene that ties Re:coded and Dream Drop Distance together. The collection was released in Japan on October 2, 2014, North America on December 2, 2014, Australia on December 4, 2014, and Europe on December 5, 2014.

== Reception ==
Reception (Note: Unless otherwise noted, review scores are for the Nintendo DS version.)

Aggregate score
Aggregator	Score
Metacritic	66/100

Review scores
Publication	Score
1Up.com	B+
G4	3/5
Game Informer	6.75/10
GameSpot	6.5/10
IGN	8.0/10
Nintendo Power	8/10
Official Nintendo Magazine	79%
VideoGamer.com	6/10

Prior to Coded's release, Jeremy Parish of 1UP.com praised the game's graphics and scope. He stated the graphics were comparable to those of the PlayStation Portable and commented that coded was a sign of mobile games turning into "full-fledged" games. 1UP.com's Kevin Gifford commented that the game deserved the attention of video game enthusiasts, and praised its features: the themes and the online mobile phone portal.

Kingdom Hearts Re:coded received mixed reviews. IGN praised the gameplay variety and graphics, but criticized the story and platforming. GameSpot said that "Frustrating platforming and a tepid narrative mar this journey into classic Kingdom Hearts realms." Game Informer called the game "The most skip-worthy entry in the series". Nintendo Power said it was "the best 'Kingdom Hearts' game to yet grace a Nintendo platform." Official Nintendo Magazine stated that "While it may suffer from some unforgivable camera problems, it is a decent game for Kingdom Hearts fans and will keep them entertained until Dream Drop Distance comes out". 1Up.com's Joe Leonard said that "While Re:coded never does anything that's particularly groundbreaking, it does what it sets out to do very well and adds some fun and interesting twists on the standard formula." Jamin Smith of VideoGamer.com said, "While this latest Kingdom Hearts has its fair share of problems, long-term fans shouldn't find it too hard to forgive and forget. "Kat Bailey of G4tv stated "It's obviously no Kingdom Hearts III -- it's not even a Birth by Sleep -- but as an appetizer for better things to come (like the forthcoming 3DS game), it will suffice."

VentureBeat reviewed the HD 2.5 Remix, and called the Re:coded part of the game collection as a long, uninteresting retread of plot points from the original Kingdom Hearts, further complicated by elements added from other games and numerous complex subplots. Game Revolution called the movie "boring", as the cut scenes were intended to fill in between sections of gameplay and never as a film unto itself.
