= Yozora =

Character in Kingdom Hearts III

- Kingdom Hearts character
- Screenshot of Yozora in Kingdom Hearts III, in a commercial for the fictional video game Verum Rex
- First game: Kingdom Hearts III (2019)
- Created by: Tetsuya Nomura
- Designed by: Tetsuya Nomura
- Voiced by: English; Dylan Sprouse; Japanese; Tasuku Hatanaka

In-universe information
- Weapon: Sword; Crossbow

Yozora (Japanese: ヨゾラ) is a fictional character introduced in the Square Enix video game Kingdom Hearts III. Yozora first appears in Toy Box, a world based on the Toy Story franchise, as the protagonist of the in-series video game Verum Rex. He later appears in the secret ending of Kingdom Hearts III, encountering protagonist Sora within the Final World in the Kingdom Hearts III Re Mind downloadable content. Yozora was created by director Tetsuya Nomura as a minor character in his introduction who would be more important in future projects, as his portrayal in the DLC Re Mind was intentionally made difficult to beat. He is voiced by Dylan Sprouse in English and Tasuku Hatanaka in Japanese.

The character's debut surprised game critics and gamers in general due to his similarities to Noctis Lucis Caelum, the protagonist of Square Enix's role-playing game Final Fantasy XV, which Nomura had also worked on. The difficulty of beating him in the DLC was remarked on by journalists, to the point that he came across as one of the hardest boss characters in the franchise. The character's enigmatic identity and nature also resulted in several journalists speculating on his role in the series.

== Creation and design ==
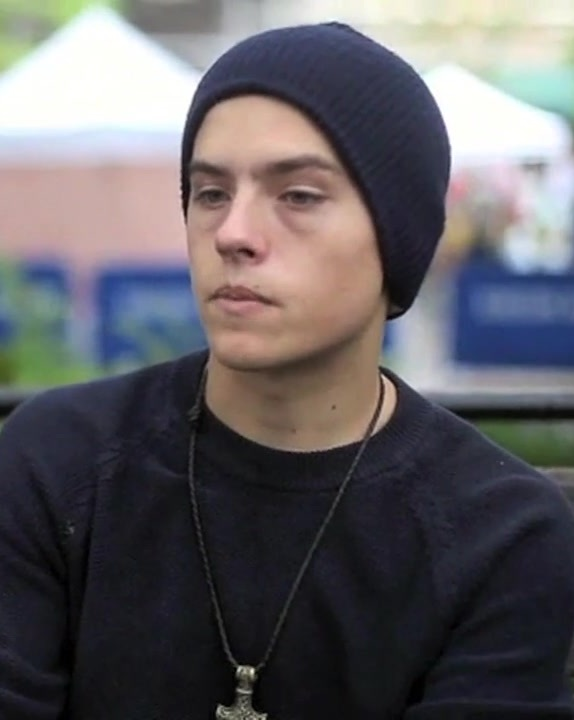
Dylan Sprouse voices Yozora in English.

Ever since his first appearance, Yozora has borne a striking similarity to Final Fantasy XV protagonist Noctis Lucis Caelum, specifically the prototype design of Noctis from the initial development of Final Fantasy Versus XIII. When asked about the similarities, Kingdom Hearts creator Tetsuya Nomura stated that, while he noted there are several similarities between the two characters, they are not connected. Though the character is first seen as a video game character within the video game, the secret ending reveals him to exist elsewhere. Nomura said that it was unrelated from a past project and instead a new idea, parts of a project he has been working on. As a result, the concept of Verum Rex did not exist until Kingdom Hearts III. The inclusion of both Sora and Riku visiting the same world where Yozora lives was done to add drama to the scenario and explore Sora's disappearance from the original ending. Yozora's design has heterochromia, with his right eye being light blue and his left eye being dark red, and he wears a short-sleeved jacket with darker parts, darker pants, and a black shirt, as well as black fingerless gloves and black boots.

Following the release of Kingdom Hearts III, Nomura felt that Yozora's reception in Western regions was better than in Japan, much to his relief. For the Kingdom Hearts III downloadable content, Re Mind, Nomura gave the staff several orders about how the secret boss should be designed, but ended up being different from his original view. The battle has two alternative endings rather than a game over as a result of how challenging Yozora was designed to be. Nomura stated that he intentionally made Yozora difficult to beat, to the point some players would cry while trying to beat him.

Following Kingdom Hearts III, Nomura denied rumors of Yozora appearing in Kingdom Hearts: Melody of Memory, but said that he would give the character a major role in another future installment since Melody of Memory primarily focused on Kairi. In 2022, Nomura explained that he had planned to create a Verum Rex game to develop Yozora, but the idea was scrapped in favor of Kingdom Hearts IV, starring Sora as the protagonist, as he was worried about his popularity.

Dylan Sprouse voices Yozora in the Re Mind downloadable content, and was overjoyed with his character due to him liking Japanese role-playing heroes. Sprouse came to regard the character as an "authentic edgelord", having taken a liking to him. In Japanese, Yozora is voiced by Tasuku Hatanaka.

== Appearances ==
Yozora is a character who appears in Toy Box, a world based on Toy Story, as the protagonist of the in-series video game Verum Rex. The characters from Toy Box confuse Sora with Yozora due to their similarities. However, when Sora finds a promotional image of Verum Rex, Goofy claims that Yozora feels more similar to Riku than Sora. In the secret ending, Yozora appears in the same world as Sora and Riku.

In Kingdom Hearts III Re Mind, the game's downloadable content episode, Yozora encounters Sora within the Final World, claiming that he was requested to save Sora, but questions his identity and battles him atop a building resembling the 109 building in Shibuya. If Sora wins, Yozora fades away before Sora returns to the Final World; if Sora loses, Yozora crystallizes him and goes to the Final World instead. Afterward, regardless of who wins, Yozora awakens in a car driven by a man who resembles Luxord, while a closing narration ensues in his and Sora's voices, with the battle's victor saying, "None of this makes sense to me."

Yozora reprises his role in the printed adaptation of Kingdom Hearts III, where he is the winner of the final fight between him and Sora.

== Reception ==
=== Comparisons with Noctis Lucis Caelum ===
Initial images of Yozora confused gaming journalists and left them to interpret him. Although he was first considered a gag character in Kingdom Hearts III due to a promotional scene of the game within the game Verum Rex, Yozora's appearance in the secret ending of the game surprised Polygon, who wondered if he would be a major character in future installments. Polygon also felt that Yozora might be a reference to Noctis Lucis Caelum, as Tetsuya Nomura had previously worked on his game Final Fantasy XV and their names have a similar meaning. GamesRadar explored the similarities between Yozora and Sora and whether or not it was Nomura's attempt to have his own take on Final Fantasy XV, most notably its early form, Final Fantasy Versus XIII, while highlighting that Yozora's scene appears to use a similar song from Final Fantasy XV's original soundtrack, "Somnus". Kotaku commented that Yozora shared several physical similarities with Noctis, most notably in his Final Fantasy Versus XIII trailers. Besides physical similarities with Noctis, Yozora shares connections with him, such as three allies similar to Noctis' friends and bodyguards and a young woman resembling Lunafreya Nox Fleuret's earlier persona Stella Nox Fleuret, who replaced her as heroine when Versus XIII became Final Fantasy XV under a new direction. In datamining the game to understand Yozora's connection with Final Fantasy XV, GamesRadar noticed that not only Yozora is similar to Noctis, his fighting abilities bear resemblance to those of Noctis; "Shift Break" is also the name of Noctis' Warp Strike ability in the Japanese version of Final Fantasy XV, and both have a similar way of wielding weapons.

Screen Rant theorized that Yozora could be the Nobody of the original Noctis from Versus based on the similar appearance and having a chance to meet Sora again. Yozora sitting in the Tokyo Metropolitan Government Building was noted by VG247 to be a nod from Tetsuya Nomura to the original scrapped Versus, as Nomura did not work on the installment once Square Enix turned it into Final Fantasy XV. However, rather than being seen as another fantasy character, the website wondered if Yozora could be a character from the real world as a result of the design used for his appearance in the ending. In an analysis of Yozora's identity and role in the story, Kotaku said that, while Nomura might have made "the most expensive joke in the history of forever" due to the comparisons with Noctis, Yozora instead might be his own character, but with similarities to both Sora and Riku.

=== Other response ===
Regarding Yozora's inclusion in the game's downloadable content as a boss character, Destructoid pointed out how overpowered he is in contrast to original Kingdom Hearts III characters and is also unique in gaming history. While also highlighting the difficulty of Yozora, drawing parallels between him and Dark Souls bosses, The Mary Sue noted that he was even more difficult than two already overpowered bosses from the series, and criticizing how the character does not feel bothered if Sora defeats him. Hobby Consolas also found Yozora challenging and recommended several tactics to beat him, stating that regular players would not be able to do it on their own. In "Kingdom Hearts 3: Who Is Yozora?", TheGamer noticed that Yozora can be the strongest character in the entire game, as even if Sora manages to defeat him, Yozora says that he was holding back. They also stated that he has made a major impact in the game despite only appearing in two scenes thanks to his enigmatic look. In "Will Kingdom Hearts 4 Feature a More Realistic Art Style?", Den of Geek expressed interest in Yozora appearing in Kingdom Hearts IV and stated that his appearance was a test for the more realistic art style of IV. In an academic study, Moisés Nieto Nogales said that Yozora's boss theme "Nachtflügel" ("Nightwings" in German) was among Yoko Shimomura's best themes in the franchise as it leaves fast arpeggiated passages that leave no room for respite, intensifying the player's sense of danger and unease.

Following the release of the first Kingdom Hearts IV trailer, IGN looked forward to the game to explore Yozora's character and his relationship with the new setting, Quadratum. Area Jugones also looked forward to Yozora's role in the future of the games, believing him to be the protagonist of a possible Verum Rex game. GameReactor believes that Yozora may be a new key figure in the new story arc of the franchise, as Kingdom Hearts III ended the arc of Xehanort and Yozora seems related to a new force. The Washington Post claimed that Yozora will be an antagonist in Kingdom Hearts IV based on how he wants Sora to stay in the seventh realm and wondered what was the mystery behind the lines he and Sora say in the end of Kingdom Hearts III, as they are the same said by Sora in the first game. GamesHub said that Yozora's true form was not fully explored yet based on his lines from Kingdom Hearts III and thus he could be a Lost Master in the next game. In "Kingdom Hearts' Future Seems to Rely on Yozora", Game Rant said that Yozora's character was filled with mysteries that might be explored in future Kingdom Hearts installments, noting similarities with both Sora and Riku and that he has the potential to be a new main character. Game Rant suggested that Yozora's inclusion in Kingdom Hearts IV could be that of a co-protagonist the player controls in parallel to Sora, citing previous Kingdom Hearts games like Kingdom Hearts 3D: Dream Drop Distance, which featured two playable characters in Sora and Riku. He further stated that Yozora is a foil to Sora's character, as "Sora acts on emotion and heart, while Yozora's world is one of realism, duty, and skepticism." This contrast between characterizations made the writer believe it was something a future game would be benefited by. Yozora's popularity also led fans to create a mod to play as him in Sora's place.
