= Kingdom Hearts III =

2019 video game

- North American cover art
- Developer: Square Enix Business Division 3
- Publisher: Square Enix
- Directors: Tetsuya Nomura; Tai Yasue
- Producer: Rie Nishi
- Designer: Tai Yasue
- Programmers: Hideki Matsuoka; Tomohito Hano
- Artist: Tetsuya Nomura
- Writers: Tetsuya Nomura; Masaru Oka
- Composers: Yoko Shimomura; Takeharu Ishimoto; Tsuyoshi Sekito; (Note: Theme song "CHIKAI/Don't Think Twice" was composed and performed by Hikaru Utada. Opening Theme "Face My Fears" was composed by Utada, Skrillex and Poo Bear, and performed by Utada. Additional music was contributed by Shotaro Shima and Kenichiro Fukui.)
- Series: Kingdom Hearts
- Engine: Unreal Engine 4
- Platforms: PlayStation 4; Xbox One; Windows; Nintendo Switch (Note: Playable until June 9, 2027); Nintendo Switch 2; PlayStation 5; Xbox Series X/S
- Release: PS4, Xbox One: JP: January 25, 2019; WW: January 29, 2019; III + Re Mind; Windows: WW: March 30, 2021; Nintendo Switch: WW: February 10, 2022; Switch 2, PS5, Xbox Series X/S: WW: October 8, 2026
- Genre: Action role-playing
- Mode: Single-player

Kingdom Hearts III (Note: Japanese: キングダム ハーツIII, Hepburn: Kingudamu Hātsu Surī) is a 2019 action role-playing game developed and published by Square Enix. It is the third main installment in the Kingdom Hearts series and the twelfth game overall, and serves as a conclusion of the "Dark Seeker Saga" story arc that began with the original game. Set after the events of Kingdom Hearts 3D: Dream Drop Distance, returning protagonist Sora is joined by Donald Duck, Goofy, King Mickey, and Riku in their search for seven guardians of light as they attempt to thwart Xehanort's plan to bring about a second Keyblade War. Their journey has them cross paths with characters and visit worlds based on different Disney intellectual properties, also being the first game in the series to include content based on Pixar productions.

Concepts for Kingdom Hearts III began as early as 2005 after the release of Kingdom Hearts II in Japan, with the game's development not being officially announced until 2013, following years of rumors and speculation. The game features recurring gameplay elements from the series, while expanding parties to five characters total, introducing new "Attraction Flow" attacks that incorporate various Disney Parks attractions, and including minigames inspired by classic Mickey Mouse cartoons in the style of 1980s LCD games.

Kingdom Hearts III was released worldwide in January 2019 for the PlayStation 4 and Xbox One and received generally positive reviews from critics. Critics praised its visuals, soundtrack, art style, gameplay, and variety of combat options, while reception towards its plot and presentation was more mixed. It sold over five million copies within its first week of release, becoming both the fastest-selling and best-selling game in the series' history in North America. A downloadable content expansion of the game titled Kingdom Hearts III Re Mind (Note: Japanese: キングダム ハーツIII リマインド, Hepburn: Kingudamu Hātsu Surī Rimaindo) was released on January 23, 2020, for PlayStation 4, and on February 25, 2020, for Xbox One. A version of the game bundled with the DLC titled as Kingdom Hearts III + Re Mind was released on Windows via Epic Games Store and Steam on March 30, 2021, and June 13, 2024, respectively. The same version was released on the Nintendo Switch via cloud streaming on February 10, 2022, and later released natively on Nintendo Switch 2, PlayStation 5, and Xbox Series X/S on October 8, 2026.

== Gameplay ==
Gameplay in Kingdom Hearts III is similar to its predecessors, with hack and slash combat, which director Tetsuya Nomura stated would be along the lines of the system seen in Kingdom Hearts II, with an evolution similar to what was seen from Kingdom Hearts to Kingdom Hearts II, and closely tied to the gameplay in Kingdom Hearts 3D: Dream Drop Distance. He also revealed that the handheld games of the series were where he could experiment with the combat mechanics, and that some of the well-received additions could appear in Kingdom Hearts III. Nomura noted that new gameplay elements are the "skeleton" of the game, saying development starts with a "fun element" for gameplay or system to then build the story and concept around. Additionally, the development team "always want to try something new", taking previously introduced mechanics and making small "tweak[s]" to them so they are customized for Kingdom Hearts III.

Sora returns as the main playable character, once again joined in the party by Donald Duck and Goofy, with the ability to have two additional characters join the party for a total of five-player parties. This is an increase from previous main entries in the series, where players were limited to two additional party members at any given time along with Sora. Certain parts of the game have Riku and Aqua as playable characters. Describing the gameplay, Nomura called the action "pretty frantic", as well as "really flashy and exciting. The enemy AI is a lot more intricate, too, and I think the gameplay will reflect that new dynamic balance." Sora can perform magic, with a new, powerful tier of each spell available to him, similar to what Aqua has available to her in Kingdom Hearts 0.2: Birth by Sleep – A Fragmentary Passage. Magic performs differently in underwater sections of the game, with Kingdom Hearts III introducing a new spell, Water. Team-up attacks are also featured, which combine Sora and various party members into one attack. Players can equip various abilities for Sora and his party members, with the system to do so "an evolution of sorts" from the system used in Kingdom Hearts II. Character summons make a return from previous entries, this time known as "Links", where an additional character joins the battle to assist the player with specialized attacks.

Sora performing an "Attraction Flow" attack that utilizes Disney Parks attractions, a new feature for Kingdom Hearts III

Sora faces Heartless, Nobodies, and Unversed in the game, with new variants of these enemy types appearing. In addition to these traditional "smaller" enemies, the player faces giant bosses, which give "Sora greater freedom of movement and room to experiment with attacks—including the new theme-park-ride summon attacks," known as "Attraction Flow". These attacks are inspired by the Disney Parks attractions Mad Tea Party, Big Thunder Mountain Railroad, Buzz Lightyear Astro Blasters, and Grizzly River Run, and generic pirate ship and carousel attractions; these attacks draw visual inspiration from Disney Parks' Main Street Electrical Parade. Sora also has the ability to jump on certain enemies, such as ones shaped like a vehicle. Regarding traversal, Nomura noted the new mechanic, called "Athletic Flow" in Japanese, was refined from the Flowmotion mechanic from Dream Drop Distance, which players felt was "a little too free... and it was kind of hard to control on their end." "Athletic Flow" allows the player to utilize the environment to access previously unreachable areas. Co-director Tai Yasue stated this mechanic was created "to try something new" and "radically change the gameplay" for the Hercules world, which led to its use in the other worlds. As a result, each world was able to have "more height, scale and sense of discovery."

Situation Commands also return from previous entries, which can trigger the Keyblade transformations. Nomura revealed that Keyblade transformations were conceived as early as the development of Kingdom Hearts II: Final Mix and would be similar to Aqua's ability in Kingdom Hearts Birth by Sleep, saying, "Each Keyblade transformation is unlocked by clearing all missions in one of [the game's] worlds, and each individual world offers its own unique Keyblade transformation." He further elaborated stating there were two forms each Keyblade can take, with "multiple layers in terms of transforming" starting with one transformation and achieving the second after "successfully connect[ing] your combos". The Keyblade transformations active the various "Formchanges"–Power, Guard, Magic, and Speed– and change Sora's outfit, similarly to the "Drive Form" mechanic in Kingdom Hearts II. Various Keyblades are linked to each form; for example, the Toy Story world Keyblade actives Power Form for Sora, with the Keyblade's transformations changing into a hammer and then into a drill. There is also "Second Form", which changes Sora's battle skills rather than transform the Keyblade. Unlike previous games in the series, players are able to quickly switch between different Keyblades seamlessly during gameplay rather than from the game's equipment menu, and each Keyblade can be leveled up to increase their abilities. Shotlocks also return, which use a focus meter that can target and lock on to individual enemies with the attack depending on which Keyblade is equipped.

Each world offers a specific gameplay element, such as first-person shooter "Gigas" mechs in the Toy Story world, downhill sledding in the Frozen world, and naval, underwater, and aerial combat in the Pirates of the Caribbean world, which also features numerous smaller islands at sea which can be explored. The Gummi Ship also returns as a means of travel between the different worlds of the game. The mechanic has been split into two phases: exploration, which has been likened to being more open-world without a fixed travel route as in previous games; and combat, which has increased its scale from previous games, with more enemies present. Gummi Ship customization also returns, with more options available than in previous Kingdom Hearts games.

Various mini-games playable throughout Kingdom Hearts III, including a cooking-themed game featuring Remy from Ratatouille, and a music game in the Tangled world. Additionally, the "Classic Kingdom" features over 20 games presented in the style of 1980s LCD games such as Game & Watch, while the 100 Acre Wood world features puzzle games. Members of the development team suggested each type of mini-game featured, with Nomura working on the "Classic Kingdom". Kingdom Hearts III also has a "Memory Archive" feature, which has several short films explaining the basic story elements of the series from the previous games.

== Story ==
=== Setting ===
The story serves as a conclusion of the "Dark Seeker/Xehanort Saga" that occurs in most preceding games. Most of the worlds featured in the game inspired by Disney properties are new to the series, with the Kingdom of Corona being based on Tangled, Arendelle on Frozen, San Fransokyo on Big Hero 6, and the two worlds on Pixar properties with Toy Box being based on Toy Story and Monstropolis on Monsters, Inc.. Two new original worlds created specifically for the game also appear: a limbo for dying hearts called the "Final World"; and Scala ad Caelum, a "seat of power" for past Keyblade wielders, where the game's final battle takes place. Returning Disney worlds are included with the tutorial stage Olympus being an expansion of the Hercules-based world Olympus Coliseum, the Caribbean from the Pirates of the Caribbean-based Port Royal, and the Winnie the Pooh-based 100 Acre Wood left as is, while original worlds include Twilight Town, the Dark World, the Land of Departure, and the Keyblade Graveyard. Worlds such as Yen Sid's Mysterious Tower, Radiant Garden, Disney Castle, and the Destiny Islands appear exclusively via cutscenes. The "Classic Kingdom" mini-games are inspired by classic Walt Disney Productions Mickey Mouse cartoons, including Giantland, The Karnival Kid, Musical Farmer, The Barnyard Battle, The Klondike Kid, and Mickey's Mechanical Man.

The Toy Story, Monsters, Inc., and Big Hero 6 worlds feature original stories, with the former set between the events of Toy Story 2 and Toy Story 3, and the latter two set after the events of their respective films. This is different from previous worlds in the series, which have often loosely followed plot lines from the films on which they were based, including the Tangled, Frozen, and Pirates of the Caribbean worlds. On the amount of worlds featured in the game, Nomura noted the development team focused on creating "rich gameplay in an individual world... designed so players can take their time and enjoy the gameplay that's available" opposed to having "multiple different little worlds".

=== Characters ===
The protagonist is Sora, a 15-year-old boy who uses a key-shaped weapon called the Keyblade to battle the forces of darkness. Sora is accompanied by Donald Duck and Goofy, the royal magician and knight captain of Disney Castle, respectively. The three are supported by other Keyblade wielders, several of whom they must rescue in preparation for their final confrontation with Xehanort, the series' primary antagonist, as "guardians of light": Mickey Mouse, an experienced Keyblade Master who is Donald and Goofy's king; Riku, a Master and Sora's best friend; Kairi, a Princess of Heart and novice wielder who is also friends with Sora; Aqua, a Master trapped in the realm of darkness; Ventus, a comatose boy whose heart has merged with Sora's; Terra, a young man possessed by Xehanort; Axel/Lea, a former member of Organization XIII and fellow novice with Kairi; Roxas, Sora's Nobody, who merged his existence with Sora's; and Xion, an artificial Organization member whose existence was erased from her friends' memories.

Organization XIII returns as the game's antagonists, led by Xehanort; as established in Dream Drop Distance, the group contains different members from previous games, including Xehanort's past incarnations. Kingdom Hearts III also introduces a new original character named Yozora, who features prominently in an in-universe video game commercial in the Toy Story world, and later in the secret ending. As with previous games in the series, a multitude of Disney characters appear in worlds based on their respective films and properties. Disney characters who serve as members of Sora's party include the returning Hercules and Jack Sparrow; new to the series are Woody and Buzz Lightyear, Sulley and Mike Wazowski, Rapunzel and Flynn Rider, Marshmallow, and Baymax. Characters that appear as summon "Links" for Sora include Dream Eaters such as the "Meow Wow" from Dream Drop Distance, Wreck-It Ralph from the film of the same name, Simba from The Lion King, Ariel from The Little Mermaid, and Stitch from Lilo & Stitch. Remy from Ratatouille (who is referred to in-game by his nickname of "Little Chef") appears in one of the game's mini-games at the bistro.

Most Final Fantasy characters were excluded from the initial game release as Tetsuya Nomura felt that they would detract from the story, and that the Kingdom Hearts characters needed less support than they did before; the Moogle character returns as the item shopkeeper, while the Re Mind DLC sees previous Final Fantasy characters Aerith Gainsborough, Cid Highwind, Squall Leonhart and Yuffie Kisaragi appear.

=== Plot ===
Yen Sid begins preparing seven Keyblade wielders as guardians of light to counteract Xehanort's plan of forging the χ-blade. Sora, accompanied by Donald Duck and Goofy, resumes his travels across other worlds to regain his power of waking, the ability to restore lost hearts, which he lost after nearly being possessed by Xehanort. (Note: As depicted in the 2012 game Kingdom Hearts 3D: Dream Drop Distance) Sora's group is opposed by Organization XIII, who target the seven Princesses of Heart as substitutes for the Keyblade wielders while seeking their thirteenth and final member. Meanwhile, Riku and King Mickey search the realm of darkness for Aqua, who knows Ventus's secret whereabouts, while Kairi and Axel train as Keyblade wielders.

Throughout their travels, Sora and Riku are contacted by former Organization member Ienzo, who decrypts Ansem the Wise's research notes on Sora's heart, revealing that the hearts of Roxas and two others—later identified as Ventus and Xion—are dormant within Sora's. To restore Roxas, the group decides to implant his heart in a replica body made by Vexen, one of the Organization's reserves, after learning that the Organization's time-traveling members are using the same method to exist in the present. Meanwhile, Ansem the Wise is abducted from the realm of darkness by the Heartless Ansem, who corrupts Aqua's heart in the process. Vexen rescues Ansem the Wise, revealing himself as a double agent, and has his fellow reserve Demyx deliver a spare replica for Roxas.

Riku and Mickey eventually lose contact with Yen Sid's group in the realm of darkness, where the corrupted Aqua attacks them. Guided by his heart to the Destiny Islands, Sora discovers Eraqus's lost Keyblade and uses it to enter the dark realm, purifying Aqua and returning her to the realm of light. Aqua then travels to awaken Ventus at Castle Oblivion, which she transforms back into the Land of Departure. When she is attacked by Vanitas, Sora rediscovers his power of waking and revives Ventus, who fends Vanitas off.

The seven guardians arrive at the Keyblade Graveyard to battle the Organization, only to be consumed by a swarm of Heartless summoned by the possessed Terra. Sustained by Kairi's power, Sora awakens in a limbo realm called the Final World, where a Chirithy guides him in restoring his fragmented body. He then uses the power of waking to revive his friends and travel back in time to the moment before their defeat, which is averted by the appearance of Terra's lingering will and the Dandelions' spirits, causing a temporal paradox. In the ensuing clash, Terra regains control of his body and reunites with Aqua and Ventus, while Axel reunites with Roxas and Xion—the latter of whom was duplicated as the Organization's final member—after they regain their hearts from Sora.

After the other Organization members are defeated, Xehanort provokes Sora into attacking him by destroying Kairi's body, allowing Xehanort to acquire the χ-blade and unlock Kingdom Hearts. Sora, Donald, and Goofy hinder Xehanort by transporting him to his boyhood home of Scala ad Caelum, where they eventually defeat him. In Xehanort's dying moments, Eraqus's spirit emerges from Terra and convinces Xehanort to surrender the χ-blade. After sealing Kingdom Hearts, Sora uses the power of waking to revive Kairi, creating another paradox. Sora and his allies later gather to celebrate at the Destiny Islands, where Sora fades away as a consequence of misusing his power.

Later, Xigbar retrieves Xehanort's Keyblade and summons the Foretellers, revealing himself to be Luxu, their fellow Keyblade apprentice. In a flashback to their youth, Eraqus and Xehanort—having finished a chess game reminiscent of Sora's final battle with Xehanort—begin a new game that predicts a battle involving Luxu and the Foretellers.

==== Kingdom Hearts III Re Mind ====
Kingdom Hearts III Re Mind is a downloadable expansion set during and after the climax of the game. It is divided into three separate scenarios—"Re Mind", the "Limitcut Episode", and the "Secret Episode"—which are unlocked in sequential order after the original game is cleared.

The titular scenario depicts Sora's rescue of Kairi during the game's ending scenes. Assuming an incorporeal form, Sora travels back in time to the battle between the guardians of light and the Organization, passing through the guardians' hearts to reach Kairi. Despite his initial failure, he finds and assembles fragments of her heart in Scala ad Caelum before his past self's final battle with Xehanort, restoring Kairi. After revisiting the Final World to invite Chirithy to the realm of light, Sora visits his friends' worlds with Kairi before disappearing.

The "Limitcut Episode" is set one year after Sora's disappearance; his allies have since led an ongoing search for him, while Kairi has voluntarily entered stasis as Ansem the Wise's test subject to help Sora. During a visit to Radiant Garden, Riku analyzes digital copies of Sora and the Organization's members programmed into Cid Highwind's computer, hoping to uncover clues to Sora's whereabouts through their battles. After the analysis proves inconclusive, Riku is approached by the Fairy Godmother to meet with Yen Sid, who has determined a method of finding Sora through Riku and two others. (Note: In Kingdom Hearts: Melody of Memory, the two are identified as Kairi and the "Nameless Star" encountered by Sora in an optional cutscene in Kingdom Hearts III.)

The "Secret Episode" focuses on Sora, who has become trapped in the Final World since his disappearance. There, Sora encounters Yozora, who claims to have been requested to save Sora, but questions Sora's identity and battles him atop a skyscraper in a modern-day metropolis. (Note: Tetsuya Nomura has acknowledged the city's resemblance to Shibuya as featured in The World Ends with You. The city is identified in Kingdom Hearts: Melody of Memory as Quadratum, set in a parallel reality to Sora's world.) If Sora loses, he is crystallized and Yozora goes to the Final World; if Sora wins, he returns to the Final World while Yozora fades away. Afterward, Yozora awakens in a car while a closing narration ensues in his and Sora's voices, which concludes with the battle's victor saying, "None of this makes sense to me."

== Development ==
After Square Enix finished development of Kingdom Hearts II: Final Mix, Tetsuya Nomura was approached by Disney, who expressed interest in a sequel. In regard to a possible release of Kingdom Hearts III, Nomura said "We have various ideas, but we're not at the point where we can say that." He added that due to the development of Final Fantasy XV—titled Final Fantasy Versus XIII at the time— which was being developed by the Kingdom Hearts II team, it was "physically impossible at the present. I feel that it's not the right time to talk about the future of Kingdom Hearts." In response to questions about the secret film in Final Mix, Nomura noted that it was of a "new series" in Kingdom Hearts rather than Kingdom Hearts III. When asked about Kingdom Hearts III, Nomura noted that fans and partners alike were interested in its release, and would work to "realize it" as soon as possible. In the Kingdom Hearts Birth by Sleep Ultimania guide book, Nomura announced three upcoming titles, one of which was Kingdom Hearts III. However, Final Fantasy XV was still his primary focus, preventing him from starting production on Kingdom Hearts III. He later noted that Kingdom Hearts III would not see a release until after 2012, due to his continuing work on Final Fantasy XV, regardless of the tenth anniversary of the series occurring in that year. The Nintendo 3DS video game Kingdom Hearts 3D: Dream Drop Distance was announced to connect to Kingdom Hearts III, both in terms of gameplay system and story.

Sony announced Kingdom Hearts III for the PlayStation 4 with a teaser trailer at its E3 2013 event in June 2013. Square Enix later confirmed the game's cross-platform release for the Xbox One as a port of the PlayStation 4 version. Though some development and concepts for the game began during the seventh generation of video game consoles, it was always intended that the game would release during the eighth generation. Unlike Kingdom Hearts and Kingdom Hearts II, which were developed by Square Enix's Product Development Division 1 team, Kingdom Hearts III was developed by Square Enix's 1st Production Department, who developed Birth by Sleep, Dream Drop Distance, and worked on the HD 1.5 Remix collection and Square Enix's Business Division 3. Rie Nishi serves as the game's producer. The game began using the in-house Luminous Studio engine to develop the game after some initial development tests had been done using Unreal Engine 3.

Directly after E3 2013, Nomura claimed that Kingdom Hearts III was announced early, based on where the game stood in development. He continued by saying, planning alongside Final Fantasy XV". Kingdom Hearts III is not intended to be the final game in the series, and serves as the final chapter of the "Dark Seeker/Xehanort" saga. Series producer Shinji Hashimoto stated in September 2013 that since Nomura was director of both Kingdom Hearts III and Final Fantasy XV, it was expected that there would be a significant gap between the release of the two, "as [they] want each game to be perfect in terms of quality." Hashimoto also reiterated Nomura's statements about the game's announcement at E3 2013, as "the company thought it was about time it addressed speculation about the long-awaited conclusion to the trilogy." A short teaser for the game appeared at the end of the Kingdom Hearts HD 2.5 Remix trailer at E3 2014. Yasue revealed that the sequence seen in the teaser was the opening scene for the game. He added that it was created by Nomura, who had "a real clear picture of [what] the starting sequence" should be, and that the text seen and heard was going to "be a real integral part of the story". As Nomura stopped working on Final Fantasy XV, focusing his attention on other projects, including Kingdom Hearts III. Nomura revealed that the game had switched to using Epic Games' Unreal Engine 4, due to a "variety of reasons", with the development team having the full support of Epic.

In January 2015, Yasue revealed that working on HD 2.5 Remix simultaneously allowed the developers to learn all the best qualities from the series to aid in creating III. Additionally, he stated the Kingdom Hearts team was sharing knowledge with the Final Fantasy XV team to expand the game and get the most out of the PlayStation 4 and Xbox One. A gameplay trailer was released during the Kingdom Hearts Orchestra World Tour in Los Angeles in mid-June 2017. The possibility of a Nintendo Switch version of the game might be created, but wanted to focus on the development and promise of completing the PlayStation 4 and Xbox One versions was thought. Nomura noted the long development was due to internal Square Enix corporate decisions, such as changing to the Unreal Engine 4 about a year into the game's development, which led to "extensive delays" and "a bit of time that needed to be rewinded and started over", and "certain timing and resources challenges within Square Enix", despite submitting and getting approved a plan for when more personal resources would be needed on the project. Regarding downloadable content (DLC) for the game, Nomura stated that "nothing is set in stone" regarding it, but he told the development team to "be prepared to be able to accommodate for something like that. We can't suddenly develop a system where we're accommodating for downloadable content. So it's not confirming or denying either way, but just so that the development team will be prepared". He would later add that he wanted to have some sort of additional content for the game, but nothing in depth had been discussed. Nomura was open to potentially adding customizable accessories, as was able to be done in Kingdom Hearts 0.2: Birth by Sleep – A Fragmentary Passage with Aqua, as that feature does not return for Kingdom Hearts III. Nomura also preferred DLC to expand or change the game over releasing a Final Mix version as had been done with some past entries in the series.

At D23 Japan 2018, Square Enix revealed the game was being developed in three sections, with approximately three worlds in each section. At that time, the worlds in the first section were said to be 90 percent complete and development of the middle section at around 60 percent. No update was given on the final section of the game, though Nomura stated its contents were "something he's always wanted to do and put into Kingdom Hearts, ever since the days of working on Final Fantasy... It is bound to surprise everyone." In April 2018, the "Classic Kingdom" mini-games were revealed for the game, while also announcing the games would be playable in the mobile game Kingdom Hearts Union χ. A selection of the mini-games were made available in Union χ in its "χ3" mode added in September 2018, which enables players to obtain the "Starlight" Keyblade in Kingdom Hearts III by completing certain objectives. By June 2018, the secret film for the game had been created. Additionally, Nomura revealed the development team was concerned with the size of the game and if it would fit on the game disc. To help with this, the team was turning some of the cutscenes into pre-rendered films to help reduce load times. Nomura had requested the use of Oswald the Lucky Rabbit in the game, which he called his favorite Disney character, but was denied such a proposal.

At E3 2018, Nomura also provided an update to the development of the Big Hero 6 world, revealing all the gameplay had been created, with the cutscenes still needing to be completed. At X018, a world based on Winnie the Pooh was revealed. To improve the Gummi Ship gameplay, a criticism in previous entries, the development team who created the scrolling shooter 1997 game Einhänder was brought in to work on this part of the game, along with other programmers and engineers who had experience working on driving games. Development of the game was completed by November 20, 2018.

=== World selection ===
Nomura revealed the Tangled world was one of the first determined to be in the game, as the development team wanted to include Rapunzel due to her strong personality and her hair, finding it fitting for the gameplay. The Pirates of the Caribbean world was included because Nomura wanted at least one world based on a live-action Disney film, stating that the Caribbean location allowed for "interesting" gameplay opportunities. He also chose to have the world be based on the third film, At World's End (2007), over other films in the series, particularly Pirates of the Caribbean: Dead Man's Chest (2006), because Dead Man's Chest is "setup" for At World's End and the game would "have to end [the story] in the middle as well". The world also mimics the color palette from the film, being "deliberately washed-out", with the sky, for example being more grey-blue over "[t]he typical fantasy blue".

Since the release of Kingdom Hearts II in 2005, The Walt Disney Company acquired Pixar, Marvel Entertainment, and Lucasfilm. When asked in 2013 if any of these properties would appear in Kingdom Hearts III, Nomura said he contacts Disney after he hears of an acquisition, though he noted that "Disney's pretty honest [on the possibility of an inclusion]. If the situation is really difficult, they'll say, it's really difficult. If it's impossible, they'll say it's impossible." He later stated that even though the Disney Company had acquired these properties, Disney Interactive Studios may not necessarily have the ability to license the content due to existing deals, such as Disney's deal with Electronic Arts for Star Wars games. Yasue added that they were "looking at all of Disney, the new ones as well" when choosing worlds for the game, including worlds potentially based on Marvel Comics and Star Wars properties. He expanded, saying, each world needed originally to stand out.

Nomura had hoped to include a world based on Toy Story since Kingdom Hearts II, saying he felt "Sora really fit in and matched well with that world" and being "able to execute that into the game is something I'm really excited for." Nomura felt Pixar worlds were extremely important to include in Kingdom Hearts, specifically one based on the film Toy Story, and stated he considered not making Kingdom Hearts III if he could not get the rights to use Pixar properties from Disney. This world was the first submitted to Pixar for approval shortly after the completion of Kingdom Hearts II, with Nomura presenting them a general outline of the story he had planned for the world. It would take Pixar "several years" to approve the story and character designs, as Nomura and Square Enix were negotiating through Disney, not with Pixar directly.

Nomura noted the approval process for each world was more difficult than with earlier games, because many of the worlds are based on some of Disney's more contemporary films, making it harder to take creative license with the worlds. He explained, "Previous to Kingdom Hearts III, I think these companies kind of saw it more as like, secondary rights permissions. They saw it more as a product, like you would a branded toy or something." Continuing, Nomura noted, "Because we are working with more recent titles, the staff who were on the original project are the ones we go to for approvals. For instance, Frozen. The staff is still there and they work with us on Frozen. Because we go directly to the creators, they have the most passion for their titles."

=== Design ===
In June 2013, Nomura discussed the updated visuals, saying that the development team tried to return the character's texture to the original "paintbrush art from Disney productions". The resulting visuals were referred to as the Kingdom Shader. Nomura felt it might not seems a massive change, it was still a notable evolution of previous visuals. Nomura also revealed that Sora is the same proportions as in previous games; however, they "muted the volume on his hair—it's not as wild." Regarding updating Sora's look from his Kingdom Hearts II design, Nomura noted that outfit's popularity, but felt the desire to change it since the game is the first numbered sequel since II's release. He added that the basis for the resulting design is a mix between Sora's costumes for Kingdom Hearts II and Dream Drop Distance, one that is "a lot more sleek and sporty" in order to make him look more acrobatic. Riku and King Mickey also received updated outfits. When asked about Noctis Lucis Caelum's similarities with Yozora, Nomura stated that while he noted there are several similarities between the two characters, they hold no connections. Roxas and Xion, popular characters from Kingdom Hearts II and other games in the series, were originally not planned to appear, but positive response to their characters led to their inclusion.

Speaking on the designs of the worlds, Nomura said the updated graphical capabilities allowed the development team "to depict the world[s] of the original film[s] as close to [their] original form as possible" after previously creating worlds to be "a stylized Kingdom Hearts world". Disney shared basic polygon information with the development team, who ultimately had to remake all of the characters, animations, and environments from scratch. Members of Pixar assisted with the creation of the worlds based on Toy Story and Monsters, Inc., and for the Pixar characters in the game, Pixar shared their actual character models with Square Enix and had the original character designers consult on the game "to make sure everything looked as true to the films as we could make it." The design team would talk weekly with Disney, sharing their assets to receive feedback, with Disney sometimes asking "for minute alterations such as insisting a character show less teeth, having their eyelids move differently or their line of sight adjusted". The line of sight notes, which came from Pixar, "were instrumental in raising the general quality of the animation throughout" according to the development team.

Supporting characters can explore an environment on their own if Sora idles momentarily, sometimes triggering additional cutscene moments. For example, Rapunzel responds if an Aero spell is cast on a group of dandelions. Speaking specifically to interactions such as this with Rapunzel, Yasue said "finding and activating these moments builds trust with" her and can lead "to additional combat scenarios and treasure opportunities".

=== Audio ===
==== Music ====
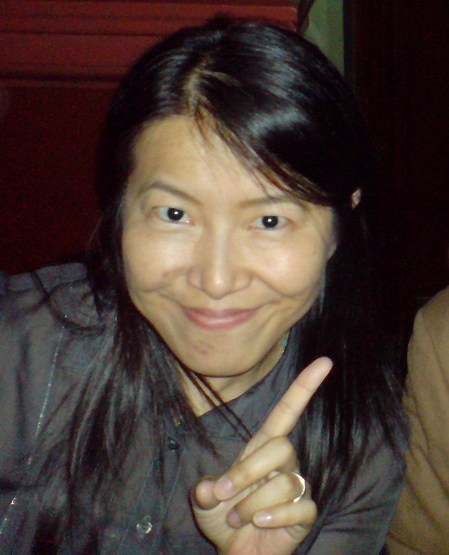
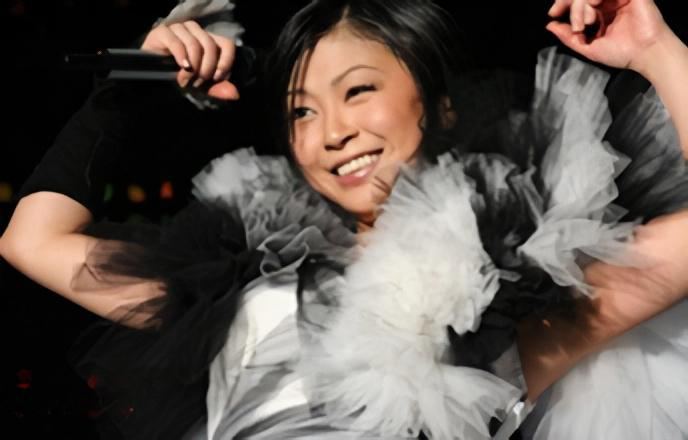
Series mainstays Yoko Shimomura (left) and Hikaru Utada (right) returned to provide music for the game.

The game's soundtrack was composed by long-time series composer, Yoko Shimomura, and features additional contributions from Takeharu Ishimoto and Tsuyoshi Sekito. Shimomura felt pressure over working in the title since it was Square's first numbered game after several years. She wanted fans to look forward to the game, believing its content would appeal to the audience. The soundtrack includes a highly altered version of the track "Dearly Beloved" in order to fit the ending of the "Seeker of Darkness Arc". The soundtrack was released on November 11, 2022, the album of which contains 8 CDs. The soundtrack that plays during Xemnas, Ansem, and Xehanort, "Forza Finale" ("last force" in Italian) was a collaboration between Shimomura (who contributed existing compositions from previous titles) and Japanese composer Yasunori Nishiki, of whom Shimomura was a fan. Due to the game being released worldwide, the team decided to localise titles in multiple languages.

As with the first two main Kingdom Hearts games, it has a theme song written and performed by Hikaru Utada, titled "Chikai" in Japanese and "Don't Think Twice" in English. It serves as the game's ending theme. An additional theme, titled "Face My Fears" by Skrillex, Poo Bear, and Utada, is used for the opening of the game. Skrillex, a fan of the series, originally intended to remix "Don't Think Twice", before creating "Face My Fears", which also has a Japanese version. Both "Face My Fears" and "Don't Think Twice" were released on January 18, 2019.

Utada requested that the producer Skrillex produce a remix of the song "Chikai" for Kingdom Hearts III, since it was known that he was a fan of the game. He proposed to instead make a completely new song. Utada agreed to collaborate with him and songwriter Poo Bear to write the song.

==== Voice cast ====
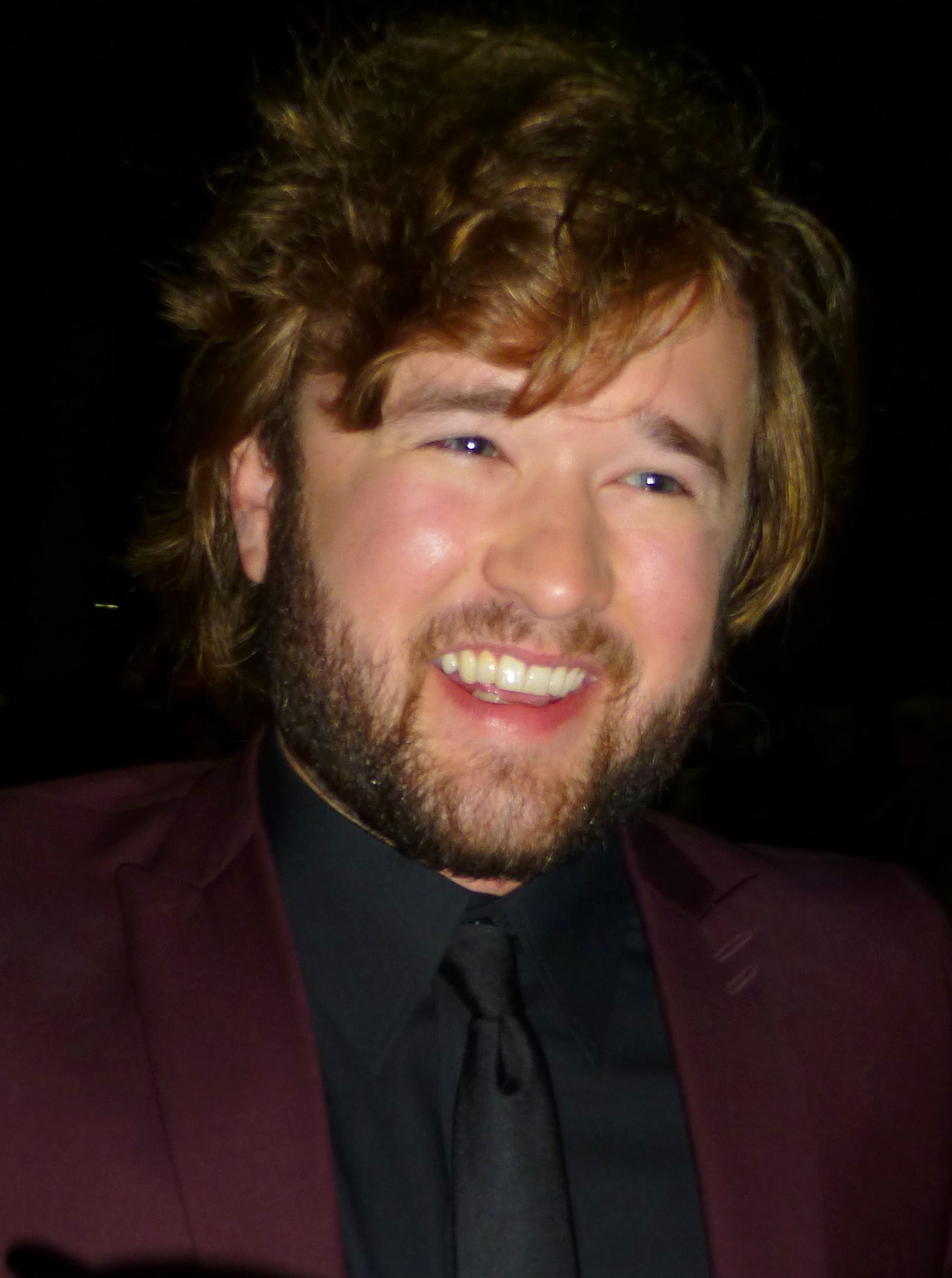
Haley Joel Osment returned to voice the lead character Sora in the English cast.

Kingdom Hearts III only features English and Japanese voice acting and lip syncing, despite previous entries in the series having dubbing in other languages. Nomura noted that the development team wanted to prioritize a global simultaneous release for the game, and given the time and resources for recording the dialogue, this would not have been possible with additional language recordings. Though the game has both English and Japanese voice acting, it does not have the ability to switch between them, as the development team found this feature difficult to properly support. A version of the game with Chinese subtitles will also be released. Kingdom Hearts III has full voice acting in optional dialogue moments outside of cut scenes, which is a first for the series.

In the Japanese voice cast, Akio Otsuka, the voice actor for Xehanort's Heartless Ansem, replaced his late father Chikao Ohtsuka, who voiced Xehanort. Miyu Irino returned to voice Sora and Vanitas as he faced more issues during recordings of the game. After finishing the game, Irino wondered if he might properly portray Sora in sequels due to his age gap. Mamoru Miyano also returned to voice Riku and his replica with similar difficulties to his more drastic age gap. Miyano reflected that Riku had to act more positive, especially when interacting with his replica, since he understood his mindset. Risa Uchida provided the voice for Kairi and Xion again, noting that Kairi had a more mature perspective such as when she befriends Axel; in contrast, Uchida felt that Xion was more relatable. Olaf received a new Japanese voice actor in an updated patch following the arrest of his original Japanese voice actor, Pierre Taki.

Haley Joel Osment returned to voice Sora in the English version. Due to Sora's lack of growth across the franchise, Osment faced the challenge of properly giving him the tone of a teenager. In retrospect, Osment found the idea of ending Kingdom Hearts III as an emotional moment as, while the series would not end with this installment, the narrative would give proper closure to the story started by the antagonist Xehanort. Tony Anselmo and Bill Farmer – who portrayed Donald Duck and Goofy in English, were overjoyed with their multiple redesigns when the characters traveled to other worlds. Other actors include David Gallagher as Riku and Riku Replica, Bret Iwan as Mickey Mouse, and Alyson Stoner as Kairi and Xion. Jason Dohring, Willa Holland, Jesse McCartney, and Mark Hamill reprise their roles as Terra, Aqua, Ventus, and Eraqus from Kingdom Hearts: Birth by Sleep, respectively; McCartney also reprises his role as Roxas. Dylan Sprouse appears in the Re Mind downloadable content as the voice of new character Yozora, and was overjoyed with his character due to him liking Japanese role-playing heroes. Rutger Hauer voices Xehanort, replacing Leonard Nimoy after his death in 2015; following Hauer's death in 2019, Christopher Lloyd portrayed the character in the Re Mind downloadable content.

== Release ==
Kingdom Hearts III was released for the PlayStation 4 and Xbox One on January 25, 2019, in Japan and other Asian countries, and on January 29, 2019, elsewhere. In July 2017, at D23, it was announced that the game would release in 2018. Almost a year later, at an additional performance of the Kingdom Hearts Orchestra World Tour in Los Angeles, the game's North American release date was revealed to be January 29, 2019. Nomura spoke to moving the game's release date outside of 2018, stating the development team had been told the original release date they had considered was not "good timing in the year" to release the game, especially considering "differences in holiday lengths and how stores behave in different regions". In addition, Square Enix requested the game be released as simultaneously as possible between Japan and the rest of the world, and not wanting to move up the release at the expense of development, resulted in the January 2019 date being chosen. The game's epilogue was planned to be added to the game on January 26 for Japan and January 30 elsewhere, while the secret ending content was planned to be added worldwide on January 31, 2019. This was done in order to help prevent them from leaking beforehand, since Nomura called them "the biggest spoilers" in the game.

A deluxe edition of the game features an art book, steelbook case, and collectible pin. Another edition, exclusive to the Square Enix store, includes Bring Arts figures of Sora, Donald, and Goofy in their Toy Box outfits in addition to the deluxe edition contents. A limited edition Kingdom Hearts III-themed PlayStation 4 Pro and DualShock 4 controller was released on January 29, 2019, exclusive to GameStop and EB Games in North America.

Following the release of the game, Nomura confirmed the development of post-launch downloadable content, saying that the development team's current "top priority is on making DLC for KH3" with the intention of releasing a single content package of DLC in lieu of a separate "Final Mix" version like previous titles in the series. A DLC episode entitled Re Mind was officially announced in June 2019, and was released on January 23, 2020 for the PlayStation 4 and February 25, 2020 for the Xbox One.

The game was released with all downloadable content included for Windows on March 30, 2021, via the Epic Games Store. It was later released on Steam after three years of exclusivity on June 13, 2024.

A cloud-streamed version of the game for Nintendo Switch including the Re Mind DLC was announced in October 2021 to coincide with Sora's inclusion as a playable character in the Switch-exclusive crossover fighting game Super Smash Bros. Ultimate and the 20th anniversary of the Kingdom Hearts franchise, and was released on the Nintendo eShop alongside cloud versions of the HD 1.5+2.5 Remix and HD 2.8 Final Chapter Prologue collections on February 10, 2022. The cloud versions were delisted on June 10, 2026 in favor of native ports for the Nintendo Switch 2 (and the Nintendo Switch in the case of HD 1.5+2.5 Remix) that were announced the same day, all of which will be released on October 8, 2026. Owners of the cloud versions are entitled to a discount on preorders, and will still be able to access the titles until June 9, 2027. Save data from the cloud versions will be able to be transferred to the native ports.

== Reception ==
=== Critical response ===
Reception

Aggregate scores
Aggregator	Score
Metacritic	PS4: 83/100; XONE: 80/100; PC: 84/100
OpenCritic	83% recommend (Note: Based on 151 reviews.); 28% recommend(ReMind) (Note: Based on 44 reviews.)

Review scores
Publication	Score
Destructoid	8/10
Electronic Gaming Monthly	7.5/10
Game Informer	9.5/10
GameRevolution	4.5/5
GameSpot	8/10
GamesRadar+	4/5
Hardcore Gamer	4/5
IGN	8.7/10
RPGamer	3.5/5
USgamer	4.5/5
Den of Geek	4/5

Kingdom Hearts III received an 83/100, indicating "generally favourable reviews", according to video game review aggregator website Metacritic. Game Informer called Kingdom Hearts III "the series at its strongest", a game that "provide[d] satisfying answers to the biggest question marks" of the series, praising the combat and gameplay, but panning the sidequests, Gummi Ship mode and general "repetitiveness" of the final worlds. Writing for IGN, Jonathon Dornbush praised the technical advancements for the game and combat. GamesRadar was generally positive, but also panned the Gummi Ship game mode for its "blandness". VideoGamer panned it in general, finding it too simplistic and repetitive.

Critical response to the narrative was mixed, with both RPGamer and GamesRadar finding the visuals of the Pirates of the Caribbean world awkward to watch due to Square's attempt to emulate realism. Despite panning the narrative as "incomprehensible", VideoGamer.com found the Toy Story worlds and Pixar in general the most entertaining. GameRevolution enjoyed the Disney worlds, complimenting both their narratives and visuals. The more complex subplots was also generally praised, but DenOfGeek claimed it was "confusing". The absence of Final Fantasy characters in the initial release of the game, apart from Moogles, were criticized by fans. GameRevolution and EGM found that the Organization XIII as final stage villains made the narrative accessible to most gamers and praised the voice acting, especially Haley Joel Osment as Sora and Richard Epcar and Paul St. Peter as Xehanort's alter egos.

Sora's characterization was praised for retaining likable heroic traits, though Polygon felt Sora's characterization was "off", lacking change. RPGamer said Sora's hero's journey is mostly shown in the climax. His fate in the ending was the subject of analysis due to his apparent death after saving Kairi to the point GameRevolution stated that Kingdom Hearts III did not give the audience the happy ending they expected despite ending Xehanort's arc. The ending was generally praised for its bittersweet character endings, although GameSpot claimed that "heavy-handed storytelling... inevitably culminates in battles that are impressive set-pieces but feel cheap and spammy to play" with the story wrapping up "in an incredibly unfulfilling way."

=== Sales ===
In its debut week, the game topped the EMEAA (Europe, Middle East, Africa, Asia) charts, in terms of both unit sales and gross revenue. In Japan, the game debuted at the top of the Media Create charts with 610,077 retail sales, above Resident Evil 2. It also debuted at the top of the UK charts, with Kingdom Hearts III more than doubling the launch week sales of Kingdom Hearts II.

In North America, it was the top-selling game in January 2019, and the third top-selling game in February 2019 (behind new releases Anthem and Jump Force). Kingdom Hearts III is the overall top-selling game in North America during the first two months of 2019, exceeding the sales of Kingdom Hearts II by over 80% during the same time span.

On February 4, 2019, Square Enix announced that more than 5 million copies were sold, becoming the fastest-selling title in the franchise, less than two weeks after its release.

On April 11, 2022, Kingdom Hearts III was revealed to have reached a total of 6.7 million units as of September 2021 surpassing Kingdom Hearts total of 6 million to become the current best selling title in the series.

=== Accolades ===
Kingdom Hearts III was nominated by IGN for the Best Game of E3 2018, Best PlayStation 4 Game of E3 2018, Best Xbox One Game of E3 2018, and Best Action Game of E3 2018. It also won the Momocon E3 Choice 2018 Game Award, and was nominated for Unreal's E3 awards.

Year	Award	Category	Result	Ref.
2018	Game Critics Awards	Best RPG	Won	
2018	Gamescom	Best Role-Playing Game	Nominated	
2018	Golden Joystick Awards	Most Wanted Game	Nominated	
2018	Gamers' Choice Awards	Most Anticipated Game	Nominated	
2019	Japan Game Awards	Award for Excellence	Won	
2019	Golden Joystick Awards	Best Visual Design	Nominated	
2019	Titanium Awards	Best RPG	Nominated	
2019	Titanium Awards	Best Soundtrack (Yoko Shimomura)	Nominated	
2019	The Game Awards 2019	Best Score/Music	Nominated	
2019	The Game Awards 2019	Best RPG	Nominated	
2020	New York Game Awards	Statue of Liberty Award for Best World	Nominated	
2020	47th Annie Awards	Best Character Animation - Video Game	Nominated	
2020	23rd Annual D.I.C.E. Awards	Role-Playing Game of the Year	Nominated	
2020	NAVGTR Awards	Game, Franchise Family	Nominated	
2020	NAVGTR Awards	Original Dramatic Score, Franchise	Won	
2020	NAVGTR Awards	Song Collection	Nominated	
2020	NAVGTR Awards	Song, Original or Adapted ("Don't Think Twice")	Nominated	
2020	SXSW Gaming Awards	Excellence in Animation	Won	
2020	Famitsu Dengeki Game Awards 2019	Best Music	Nominated	

=== Re Mind ===
Reception

Aggregate score
Aggregator	Score
Metacritic	PS4: 66/100

Review scores
Publication	Score
Destructoid	8/10
Game Informer	6.5/10
GameSpot	4/10
IGN	6/10
Jeuxvideo.com	13/20

The DLC received "mixed" responses based on the review site Metacritic. IGN criticized the new boss characters were too difficult to defeat as there are few ways to level up. GameSpot and GameInformer called it a director's cut, with the former praising the inclusion of Riku, Aqua and Kairi as playable characters, but criticizing how the main fighting area, the Keyblade Graveyard, had poor design in contrast to other worlds previously seen in the franchise. JXV said that the high difficulty of the boss fights the DLC offers was Square's response to gamers' criticism in regards to the easy difficulty of the actual game as well as the return of quick time events from the previous game, Kingdom Hearts II. Destructoid liked the inclusion of new playable characters and how the new bosses seem to be a response to the easy difficulty. Comic Book Resources regarded Data Xehanort and Yozora as the most challenging bosses in the entire game.

In regards to the narrative, GameInformer found it disappointing as, while the game allows the player to explore a new area and see more Final Fantasy characters, they are not properly followed. Still, they felt the new cutscenes helped to improve the game's final act, making the story more enjoyable. Destructoid enjoyed the new cutscenes that expand on the game's final battle between Sora's group and Xehanort's forces, especially because Kairi is given more screentime and plays a more pivotal role in the outcome than in the original game. Unlike GameInformer, Destructoid praised the new boss characters as fighting them provided the reviewer more fun. IGN felt that the narrative was hard to follow as the game ends on a more open nature than the original game. GameSpot was more critical to the story, labeling it as "filler" and that it lacks the Disney and Pixar worlds that made the game enjoyable.
