= Characters of the Final Fantasy XIII series =

Promotional artwork featuring the main cast of the Final Fantasy XIII games. Top from left: Paddra Nsu-Yeul, Caius Ballad, Oerba Yun Fang, Oerba Dia Vanille, Noel Kreiss, Snow Villiers, Serah Farron, Mog, Sazh Katzroy, Lumina, Lightning (Claire Farron) and Hope Estheim.

Final Fantasy XIII is a 2009 role-playing game released by Square Enix that revolves around the struggles of a group of humans over a predestined fate. The game's two sequels, Final Fantasy XIII-2 and Lightning Returns: Final Fantasy XIII, build on the first game's story and mythos. In video game publications and among the staff at Square Enix, the three games have come to be referred to as the "Lightning Saga", and the core concepts they contain are drawn from the mythos of the Fabula Nova Crystallis subseries. The visuals of the original characters were designed by Tetsuya Nomura and Nao Ikeda, while many later characters were created by other designers, including Hideo Minaba, Yusuke Naora and Toshiyuki Itahana. Their original stories were created by Motomu Toriyama and written up by Daisuke Watanabe.

The series' central characters are Lightning, a former soldier and the core character in all three games; Serah Farron, Lightning's sister; Snow Villiers, an optimistic young man engaged to Serah; Hope Estheim, a young man who develops a strong bond with Lightning; Sazh Katzroy, a former airship pilot; Oerba Dia Vanille and Oerba Yun Fang, two women who inadvertently set the first game's events in motion. Three further characters appear in XIII-2: Noel Kreiss, a hunter who sets out to change his bleak future; Caius Ballad, a man from Noel's past who wishes to bring about a predestined apocalypse; and Paddra Nsu-Yeul, a seeress who has reincarnated through history. Lightning Returns introduces two characters: Lumina, a doppelganger of Serah; and Bhunivelze, the main deity of the Final Fantasy XIII universe.

The characters in the games have been the basis of several pieces of merchandise produced by Square Enix, such as statues, action figures, apparel, and jewelry. They have been subject to mostly positive reviews; most observers favorably compared the characters to those in the previous games and praised the voice acting, but some critics have stated that the plot line of the characters have been confusing when first introduced. In XIII-2, the shift to new or secondary characters and the change in importance and story role of the previous game's main cast grated with some reviewers, while others applauded the new characters' development and interactions. In Lightning Returns, the characters' stories were often criticized for being underdeveloped or included for the sake of ending their stories.

== Creation and development ==
Promotional image showing the six original protagonists as they appear in Final Fantasy XIII. Lightning and Snow went through several redesigns across the three games.

The overarching theme of the games is the effects the deities of the core mythos had on the human population, especially the fate forced upon the main characters. Yuji Abe, a designer on Lightning Returns, defined it as "a battle with destiny", with the burden of destiny growing progressively heavier for the main characters over the course of the games. The setting and story was written around and drawn from the official mythology for the Fabula Nova Crystallis series, which also includes Final Fantasy XV and Final Fantasy Type-0. For Final Fantasy XIII and its sequels, Toriyama created a story focusing on the existing deities within the mythos and their influence on the world. Different deities from the mythos were focused on in each installment, such as the goddess Etro in XIII-2. Toriyama wanted Lightning to be an exceptional female protagonist for the Final Fantasy series, with her having great strength and combat ability, as opposed to gentler characters like Aerith from Final Fantasy VII or Yuna from Final Fantasy X. Unlike them, Lightning's personality was conceived before her outfit was designed or her voice actresses were cast. The evolution of her portrayal, story, and personality became one of the driving forces of the series.

Most of Final Fantasy XIII's characters were designed by Tetsuya Nomura, who also served as the character designer for Final Fantasy VII, Final Fantasy VIII, and Final Fantasy X. The characters' stories were created by Motomu Toriyama and Daisuke Watanabe, with the main concept of "characters at the mercy of a predetermined, unjust fate". Nao Ikeda designed Snow, Jihl Nabaat and Gadot, Lebreau, and Maqui. The cast, along with the world's characters, were intended to mimic the multi-ethnic feel of the United States rather than Asia or Europe. During production of the first game, Toriyama wanted the cast to be a group that was originally combative with one another but brought together by the game's events; to achieve this goal, he wrote the narrative to include key moments for the characters' developments, including the scene between Sazh and Vanille in the city of Nautilus and the reconciliation between Snow and Hope in the town of Palumpolum. The characters underwent several changes in the early stages of development, including Sazh's ethnic origin and Fang's gender.

For XIII-2, Toriyama wanted a dark and serious tone to the world and story, in contrast to the jovial atmosphere of Final Fantasy X-2, and the story was scripted to play out as "pieces of drama" like a television series. Its story and characters were focused around the concepts of mortality and, in Toriyama's words, the "wish for rebirth": the latter theme was directly inspired by the Great East Japan earthquake. Watanabe stayed as one of the game's writers, with writer and novelist Emi Nagashima, better known under her pen name of Jun Eishima, joining as a story consultant. Lightning's outfit was designed by Isamu Kamikokuryo, who worked from a rough outline done by Nomura, who also designed the characters' facial features. Two new character designers were brought in: Hideo Minaba, who contributed to new character outfits such as Hope and Alyssa's, and Yusuke Naora, who designed outfits for Serah, Noel and Caius. Lightning and Serah's designs were created to directly reflect the environments they start out from. The character of Noel was added at a later stage in the original planning, since the original plan for Serah to travel alone with the moogle Mog seemed to clash too much with the game's serious nature.

For Lightning Returns, the developers decided to have Lightning as the sole protagonist so that players could get to know her better. The story was created to bring closure for the characters of the series. The core themes of the game were the "salvation of souls", and the "rebirth of Lightning", the latter being the main reason the game was not called XIII-3. Nomura returned to design Lightning and Snow's new looks and Kamikokuryo returned to design new outfits for Lightning and help with the world design. Two new designers brought in were Toshitaka Matsuda, an artist for Final Fantasy XII: Revenant Wings, and Toshiyuki Itahana, who had worked on Final Fantasy IX and the Crystal Chronicles series. Both designed multiple battle costumes for Lightning, many of them inspired by the artwork of Yoshitaka Amano. Itahana and Matsuda also respectively designed Lumina and Bhunivelze. Watanabe returned as the main scenario writer, while also receiving ideas for scenes from Toriyama and other members of staff. His work on the script was slow, causing problems from the rest of the development team: in response to this, he worked hard to create an appropriate finale. During his work, he had a strong nostalgic feeling while writing the characters' lines.

In order to reduce the delay between the local and international releases, the English voice acting for XIII was done while the game was in development. However, it lacked the infrastructure needed to support simultaneous development and localization. The lack of deadlines, communication, and synchronization between the various departments, as well as continuing changes to the script and cutscenes, led to a turbulent development. The game's script needed to be re-translated as the various cutscenes changed, and large parts of the dialogue had to be rerecorded, partly because they lacked proper emotional drive at the right moments. For XIII-2, a tool called Moomle, developed by English translator Tom Slattery and his Japanese counterpart Teruaki Sugawara from their experience with the first game, was used to make sure all parts of the localization process were synchronized. For Lightning Returns, the Japanese voice actors recorded their dialogue well after their characters' scenes had been created, as opposed to the normal procedure of recording lines before cutscene creation. For the English version, the amount of dialogue translation and recording resulted in a two month delay between the game's local and international releases.

Eidolons (召喚獣, Shōkanjū; Summon Beasts), beings who aid the protagonists after being tamed in battle, are the games' versions of summons, including series staples Odin, Shiva, Alexander, and Bahamut, as well as newcomers Hecatoncheir and Brynhildr. Their summon sequences were designed to be flashy and combined with gameplay, incorporating feedback from previous titles about the length of time for the summons to take effect compared to previous titles in the Final Fantasy series. The Eidolons were designed around the game's theme of "transformation" and can transform into vehicle-like forms for their masters to ride. They were planned to feature in XIII-2 as part of a DLC episode, but the idea was scrapped and the gameplay was folded into one of the title's minigames. For Lightning Returns, although the Eidolons still exist, they were not available in gameplay and only served as an element of the story. Carried over from the Fabula Nova Crystallis mythos are the fal'Cie, demigods who work to find a way of bringing their respective deities back into the world. The fal'Cie can choose people to become l'Cie, servants given magical powers and a task to complete within a given time, called a Focus. Those who succeed go into crystal stasis, while those that fail become monsters called Cie'th.

== Playable characters ==
=== Lightning (Claire Farron) ===
Lightning (ライトニング, Raitoningu) is the central protagonist of Final Fantasy XIII and its sequels, serving as the primary protagonist in XIII, a supporting character of XIII-2 and the sole playable character of Lightning Returns. Born as Claire Farron, or Éclair Farron (エクレール・ファロン, Ekurēru Faron) in the original Japanese version, she lost her parents when she was 15 years old. She takes on a new name to become a stronger person to help her younger sister Serah, only to cause tension between them. In the first game, she is a former Sanctum soldier who sets out to save her sister from the fal'Cie and strives to save Cocoon from destruction. At the beginning of XIII-2, she is whisked away to Valhalla, the capital of the Unseen World, to act as the Goddess Etro's protector, sending messages to her allies and guiding Serah through time to set things right. However, she fails, causing the death of Etro and the release of Chaos, a dark energy that Etro had kept sealed away. In Lightning Returns, Lightning serves the god Bhunivelze as the savior of the inhabitants of Nova Chrysalia during its final days, fighting old friends and enemies to save their souls. She is voiced by Ali Hillis in English and by Maaya Sakamoto in Japanese.

=== Oerba Dia Vanille ===
Oerba Dia Vanille (ヲルバ＝ダイア・ヴァニラ, Woruba-Daia Vanira; Vanille of the Dia clan from the village of Oerba) is a 19-year-old l'Cie from Gran Pulse, Oerba Yun Fang's childhood friend, and the narrator of Final Fantasy XIII. She is one of the l'Cie who brings about the game's events and one of the two Pulse l'Cie chosen to become Ragnarok, a monster designed to bring down Cocoon which manifested imperfectly during the War of Transgression, a conflict between the two worlds. When Vanille enters a state of emotional distress, she summons and defeats the Eidolon Hecatoncheir. After Orphan's defeat, she and Fang transform into Ragnarok and form a crystal pillar to prevent Cocoon colliding with Pulse. After this, Vanille remains with Fang in crystal stasis within the pillar: from there, the two end up seeing everything that is going on, remaining unaffected by the changes in the timeline. In Final Fantasy XIII-2, though still in the pillar, Vanille and Fang help Serah escape from the dream in the Void Beyond that Caius traps her in. At the end of the game, they are rescued from the collapsing pillar. In Lightning Returns, Vanille awakens from crystal stasis with Fang and gains the ability to hear the voices of the dead. While dubbed a saint by the Order, a religious organization devoted to the deity Bhunivelze, she is exploited for a fatal ritual to destroy the souls of the dead. On the final day, Lightning and Fang persuade Vanille to use her power to free the dead and enable them to be reborn. Vanille is voiced by Georgia van Cuylenburg in English and by Yukari Fukui in Japanese.

=== Serah Farron ===
Serah Farron (セラ・ファロン, Sera Faron) is an 18-year-old human from Cocoon. After their parents died years prior to the start of the game, Lightning, then still called Claire, raised Serah and set out to become a protector for her, but her devotion to that goal caused tensions between them. Eventually, Serah becomes engaged to Snow days prior to the start of the game, and Lightning strongly objects to their relationship. Serah eventually reveals to Snow and Lightning that, while exploring the Pulse Vestage where the fal'Cie Anima was kept, she was made a Pulse l'Cie. Lightning later discovers that Anima has captured Serah after disbelieving her sister. Although given the Focus to become Ragnarok, she changes her Focus through her own will, then imparts her new mission, to save Cocoon, to Lightning and Snow before turning to crystal after being found. The change of her Focus eventually inspires the other l'Cie to do the same. After Orphan's defeat, Serah, along with Dajh, resumes her life as a human and reconciles with Lightning, who accepts her relationship with Snow.

Serah returns as the protagonist in Final Fantasy XIII-2. She is the only one who remembers Lightning being on Gran Pulse after she is taken to Valhalla, with others believing she sacrificed herself to save Cocoon. She eventually becomes a teacher in the village of New Bodhum, the town she and Snow help build on Gran Pulse, before monsters invade it three years after the fall of Cocoon. Serah is aided by Noel Kreiss, who tells her of Lightning's fate and his own mission. After Serah accepts Noel's offer to be brought to Lightning, the two embark on a journey across time to find her sister. In the process, Serah encounters Caius Ballad while learning from Paddra Nsu-Yeul that she possesses the same ability as her to see the future. Despite learning that she would die if she continues seeing visions of the future, Serah resolves to change the future for everyone's sake. However, after Caius's defeat and returning to Gran Pulse five hundred years in her future, Serah has another vision and dies moments before Valhalla's chaos infects Gran Pulse. Serah appears to Lightning in Valhalla as a spirit, telling her she knew she could have died from her visions, but took the risk regardless. Serah promises Lightning they will see each other again as long as Lightning promises to remember her. In Lightning Returns, Serah's soul, which has been kept safe within Lightning, is removed and cast away by Bhunivelze. Lumina acts as a shelter for Serah's soul, resulting in the two being similar in appearance. Bhunivelze also creates a false version of Serah to keep Lightning in line. This false Serah, who develops feelings for her 'sister', arrives when Lightning intends to become the protector of the new world and persuades her to accept her vulnerabilities and call for aid. The real Serah reunites with Lightning and her allies, and travels with them to the new world.

Early in the development of XIII, Serah was meant to be a playable character, but was eventually delegated to a supporting character because of technical issues. Tetsuya Nomura, in an interview, said that he designed Serah's hair so that her silhouette would mirror Lightning's. For XIII-2, the developers decided to change Serah and Lightning's roles, with Serah becoming the game's protagonist, while Lightning was the object of her quest. Yusuke Naora was told to design Serah's new costume like the "plug suit" outfits from Neon Genesis Evangelion and was asked to give her a necklace for plot reasons. Part of the challenge for the game was making Serah more active, but maintaining her femininity, which is the reason she was given a bow as her weapon. Another reason behind the design of her weapon was the fact that the developers wanted to give the characters means to attack both up close and at long range. Aside from Naora's design, Yuko Oshima of AKB48 was asked to design two potential DLC outfits for Serah: a black combat outfit titled "Exposure and Defense" (later retitled "Style and Steel"), and a second red-and-white outfit titled "Little Red Riding Hood", meant to be indicative of Serah's change into an adult. After a popular vote, the former costume was chosen and released in April 2012. Serah is voiced by Laura Bailey in English and by Minako Kotobuki in Japanese.

=== Snow Villiers ===
Snow Villiers (スノウ・ヴィリアース, Sunō Viriāsu) is a 21-year-old human from Cocoon who proposes to Serah Farron two days prior to the start of Final Fantasy XIII. During the Purge, a mass exodus of Cocoon citizens after the activation of the Pulse fal'Cie Anima, Snow and his group NORA engage in a battle with PSICOM, the security force of Cocoon. After becoming a l'Cie and finding Serah in crystal stasis, he despairs and is forced to tame his Eidolon, the Shiva Sisters. After meeting up with Cid Raines and Oerba Yun Fang, Snow pairs up with Hope while oblivious to his grudge against him. Hope unsuccessfully tries to murder him for his part in his mother's death, but reconciles with him soon after. Snow then reconciles with Lightning and receives forgiveness from Hope's father. He and the others then rescue Sazh and Vanille before escaping to Gran Pulse, where Lightning and Snow resolve to see Serah together after destroying Orphan. After Orphan's death, Snow and Lightning reunite with Serah, then start planning to set up a new town on Gran Pulse.

In Final Fantasy XIII-2, Snow left a year prior to its events, promising Serah to find Lightning for her. His search would eventually result in him traveling through time while seeing Lightning in a dream telling him to protect the crystal pillar holding Cocoon, seeing a vision of the world's fate, and becoming a l'Cie with the Focus of fighting beside Serah at the final battle. After appearing on Cocoon three hundred years in his future, Snow attempts to destroy a monster threatening Cocoon's supporting pillar. Serah and Noel come to Snow's aid and help him defeat it by negating the anomaly causing its growth. With the threat gone, Snow entrusts Noel with Serah's care and dissolves from the moment in time while promising Serah that they will meet again. Snow then travels to the Coliseum, a fighting arena separated from the flow of time, and after Serah and Noel challenge him to combat and win, he is forced to remain due to the Chaos binding him to the Coliseum.

In Lightning Returns, after being released from his imprisonment, Snow meets up with Noel and Hope before coming upon the city of Yusnaan and becoming its protector and patron. Over the next five hundred years, he becomes jaded and depressed, brooding on Serah's death and being weighed down by guilt at his inability to stop the world from decaying. When Lightning meets up with him, his changed appearance and attitude makes her fear that he has gone insane. When they next meet, Snow reveals his intention to absorb a massive cloud of Chaos at the center of Yusnaan's palace, transform into a Cie'th and have Lightning kill him as a punishment for his failure. He performs this act and Lightning does battle him, but she manages to reverse the transformation and convince him to keep hoping and guide Serah to the new world.

Snow was designed by Nao Ikeda and Tetsuya Nomura. He was designed around a motif of ice, with his bandanna inspired by an unused costume element from Kingdom Hearts coded designed by Kamikokuryo. For XIII-2, the bandanna was removed and he was given a new hairstyle. Originally to have been called "Storm", the development team nicknamed the character "Mr. 33 cm" in reference to his shoe size while his name was still a secret. Nomura designed his darker look in Lightning Returns. Snow's personality in XIII, which carried over to XIII-2, was created to be passionate, optimistic and impulsive, opposing and acting as a foil for Lightning's cold mannerisms. He has also been described in interviews as the "tough guy" type, and not having a jealous side to him. He was originally to have been a more negative delinquent athletic type, but this was changed to his "big brother" persona. Concerning his stance in Lightning Returns, Kitase described Snow as "struggling with all his might to keep himself from falling apart from the sadness of losing Serah". His design was intended to reflect the state of the world, as he had changed from his lighthearted former self because of the world's fate. His darker portrayal was emulated by his weapon in the opening cinematic. Watanabe enjoyed writing the character's story, as he was able to give Snow scenes where he appeared "cool", rather than taking on "thankless" roles. VideoGamer.com's Wesley Yin-Poole called his relationship with Lightning and Hope, and the way he coped with Serah's fate, one of the most interesting aspects of the original game. Aside from his appearance in the XIII games, the character was featured in the rhythm game Theatrhythm Final Fantasy as a subcharacter representing Final Fantasy XIII, and his outfit from that game was featured as an optional character costume in Final Fantasy XIV: A Realm Reborn along with Lightning's Guardian Corps uniform. Snow is voiced by Troy Baker in English and by Daisuke Ono in Japanese.

=== Hope Estheim ===
Hope Estheim (ホープ・エストハイム, Hōpu Esutohaimu) is a 14-year-old boy who is an exile at the start of Final Fantasy XIII. At the beginning of the game, Hope and his mother Nora, who are on vacation in the town of Bodhum, are selected for the Purge. Under Snow's leadership, Nora joins the resistance in the Hanging Edge, but falls to her death during the battle while trying to protect Hope and after saving Snow's life, which angers Hope greatly. After he becomes a l'Cie and is separated from the main party, Hope follows Lightning to "toughen up" while plotting his assassination attempt on Snow for revenge. Despite Lightning's objections, Hope tries to kill Snow, but after coming to the realization that he had been blaming Snow to cope with his mother's death, they settle their differences. When Hope returns home to his father, Bartholomew, he tells him what happened to Nora and repairs their relationship. When on Gran Pulse, he tells the others to leave him as he is afraid he will hurt them, but inadvertently summons his Eidolon Alexander. After Orphan's defeat, Hope tells Lightning that Fang and Vanille changed their fate by fulfilling their Focus of transforming into Ragnarok to save Cocoon rather than destroying it.

In Final Fantasy XIII-2, which takes place a decade after the events of Final Fantasy XIII, a 24-year-old Hope is the leader of the scientific expedition group known as the Academy. He helps Noel and Serah in their journey to find Lightning when they arrive in his time. Other than knowing that time travel is possible and wishing to undo events of the past, Hope is planning on reviving Cocoon with a different power source. While originally planning to create an artificial fal'Cie, he is dissuaded upon seeing a vision of Serah fighting his creation. He and his assistant Alyssa Zaidelle then use a time capsule to go 387 years into the future to oversee Hope's New Cocoon Project, a plan to build a man-made Cocoon in preparation for Cocoon's destined fall in the next century. When the old Cocoon falls, Hope and Sazh manage to rescue Vanille and Fang from the crystal pillar before it crumbles.

In Lightning Returns, Hope resides in a special base constructed within the new Cocoon called the Ark, communicating with Lightning via a wireless com-link. Hope is returned to his 14-year-old image and stripped of his emotions by Bhunivelze, but retains his memories from the past two games. He is instrumental in keeping the world going, for as Lightning completes quests and fulfills missions, he uses energy generated from those acts to prolong the world's life. On the final day, Hope reveals that he acted as Bhunivelze's eyes and ears and will now be disposed of. Bhunivelze then uses Hope as an avatar, speaking with Lightning and capturing her allies. During the final battle, Lightning frees him from Bhunivelze's control and he aids her in defeating Bhunivelze for good.

At the 2009 TGS event, it was revealed that Hope's silver hair was meant for Lightning, but when her hair color was decided as pink, Hope received the silver hair coloring instead. Hope's Academy uniform for XIII-2 was designed by Hideo Minaba. While he was portrayed as sensitive and vulnerable in XIII, for XIII-2, the game's director wished to portray Hope as a more mature, authoritative person. According to Toriyama, how Hope matured, as seen through Lightning's eyes, formed one of the main story themes for Lightning Returns. He was originally going to have a third unique design for the game, but the team eventually decided to settle on his original teenage appearance. In a later interview, he said that while the character was much liked by the team, he felt that Hope lacked the heroic image that could make him a leading character. Watanabe later said that he felt Hope helped complete Lightning's character and enable her to grow as a person. Hope is voiced by Vincent Martella in English and Yūki Kaji in Japanese.

=== Sazh Katzroy ===
Sazh Katzroy (サッズ・カッツロイ, Sazzu Kattsuroi) is a 40-year-old human former airship pilot. The Sanctum takes his son, Dajh, in the aftermath of him becoming a Cocoon l'Cie three days earlier when Sazh bought him a Chocobo chick. Along with Lightning, he derails the train carrying the Cocoon exiles at the start of Final Fantasy XIII. After the party splits up following Anima's defeat, Sazh goes with Vanille as he tells her about his son, but Jihl Nabaat reveals Vanille's part in his son becoming a l'Cie, causing him to summon the Eidolon Brynhildr. Unable to kill Vanille, Sazh attempts suicide. Nabaat then captures Sazh and Vanille. Before Lightning's party rescues Sazh and Vanille, he reconciles with her for her role in Dajh's fate. After traveling to Pulse, Sazh eventually forgives Fang for what happened to Dajh. After Vanille and Fang transform into Ragnarok and prevent Cocoon from colliding with Pulse, Sazh reunites with Dajh.

After these events, Sazh leaves to help the civilians of Cocoon, then decides to move onto Gran Pulse. At some point during the events of XIII-2, Sazh is sucked through a rip in time, is separated from Dajh, and ends up in Serendipity, a palace in the Void Beyond. While there, he meets Chocolina and learns of the fate facing the world from Serendipity's owner. After reuniting with Dajh and deciding to fight no matter what the future holds, they go through a time gate and help Serah and Noel in their battle against Caius. Sazh then helps Hope save Fang and Vanille from the crystal pillar before Cocoon falls. In Lightning Returns, Sazh sets up his home in the Wildlands. After Dajh's soul is lost and his body falls into a coma, Sazh becomes tormented by his seeming failure to protect his son, but Lightning helps retrieve the fragments of Dajh's soul, lifting his burden.

In the May 2009 edition of Official PlayStation Magazine, Yoshinori Kitase said that Sazh was intended to be an Eddie Murphy-style comic-relief character as well as a sympathetic character. Toriyama was initially worried about the unconventional afro hairstyle. Due to the character having the largest amount of dialogue in the game, an experienced voice actor was chosen for him. His early look was, as revealed in the a special Ultimania guide released during 25th anniversary celebrations for the series, very different from his final design, with him being white with long brown hair, and wielding a shoulder-cannon rather than machine pistols. He was also named "Baz". He is voiced by Reno Wilson in English and by Masashi Ebara in Japanese.

=== Oerba Yun Fang ===
Oerba Yun Fang (ヲルバ＝ユン・ファング, Woruba-Yun Fangu; Fang of the Yun clan from the village of Oerba) is a 21-year-old l'Cie from Gran Pulse and Oerba Dia Vanille's childhood friend. The two awaken from crystal stasis within the Pulse Vestige containing the fal'Cie Anima thirteen days prior to the start of Final Fantasy XIII, which kicks off the chain of events leading to Cocoon's descent into chaos. After forcing Vanille to escape possible capture without her, Fang begins serving as Cid Raines's subordinate in the Cavalry. She eventually meets Snow and becomes his partner as part of Cid's plan to overthrow the Sanctum, later befriending Lightning. After rescuing Sazh and Vanille on board the Palamecia, she and Vanille reunite. Later, after being told about their focus and resolving to fulfill it even if she has to fight her friends, Fang fights and tames the Eidolon Bahamut. On Gran Pulse, despite Vanille's protests, Fang reveals that she was responsible for scarring Cocoon's shell centuries earlier and bringing deadly recriminations on the people of Gran Pulse.

When they face Orphan, despite the party's pleas for Fang to not transform into Ragnarok, Fang eventually transforms into an incomplete version and fights the fal'Cie alone, but is tortured as a result of her failure, only to be saved by Lightning's group. After Orphan's destruction, Fang and Vanille complete their Focus by becoming Ragnarok to save Cocoon from crashing into Gran Pulse. In Final Fantasy XIII-2, Fang and Vanille appear to help Serah escape from the endless dream in the Void Beyond that Caius placed her in, and at the end they are rescued from Cocoon's pillar when it finally collapse. By the events of Lightning Returns, after awakening and seeing Vanille being used by the Order, Fang has taken up residence in the Dead Dunes and becomes the leader of a bandit group bent on preventing the Order from obtaining a relic within the desert. She attempts to destroy the relic to prevent Vanille from being killed by the ritual. Fang appears on the final day, helping Lightning dissuade Vanille from going through with the ritual and helping her guide the souls of the dead to the new world.

Fang was originally scripted to be a male character during the early stages of Final Fantasy XIII's development, but was rewritten as a female character. Along with this, the sex appeal that was originally going to be part of Lightning's look was transferred to Fang to give Lightning a more hard-edged persona. One of Fang's motivations in Final Fantasy XIII is to protect Vanille at any cost, though she has feelings of resignation in Lightning Returns. Director Motomu Toriyama described this as the dark side of her heart. Fang is voiced by Rachel Robinson in English and Mabuki Andou in Japanese.

=== Noel Kreiss ===
Noel Kreiss (ノエル・クライス, Noeru Kuraisu) is one of the last remaining humans in a devastated future, and was a friend and student of Caius Ballad before the two grow apart due to the latter's wish to destroy time. After the incarnation of Yeul in his time dies, Noel sets out to find Valhalla, intending to change Yeul's fate. On the point of death, he is brought to Valhalla, where he sees Lightning and Caius in battle. Lightning gives Noel the task of finding Serah and bringing her to Valhalla. After traveling to Serah's time, Noel sets out with her to find Lightning, repair the timeline, and change his future at any cost, even if it means erasing himself from existence. Upon meeting Snow, Noel develops a hatred of him because of the former's impulsive attitude, but eventually gains respect for Snow. As they travel, his memories are restored and he tries to dissuade Serah from continuing, as her visions of the future would soon kill her. When she decides to go on, he comes too after seeing an image of him and the Yeul of his time meeting again. Though he and Serah finally defeat Caius in Valhalla, Noel is forced into a situation that ends with Caius's death. Soon after returning, to 500 AF, forced to watch Serah die, Noel realizes his actions have triggered the apocalypse Caius wished for.

By the events of Lightning Returns, he is forced to protect the people as the "Shadow Hunter" after the Order of Salvation takes over Luxerion. He also becomes obsessed with a fabricated prophecy that if he kills Bhunivelze's savior, he will bring about a new world where he can live in peace with Yeul. Ultimately, he has become burdened by guilt because of his actions in causing the world to fall into its current state. Noel's belief in the prophecy is reinforced when Lightning appears as the savior. They briefly ally to rout an extremist sect of the Children of Etro, who have been killing women who resemble Lightning. They later fight at Noel's hideout, where Lightning provokes Noel into fully expressing his rage and engaging him in battle. After the battle, Noel destroys the oracle drive playing the fabricated prophecy, finally freeing himself from his guilt. After Bhunivelze's defeat, Noel offers his life to give Yeul a chance to live in the new world, and Caius allows the final incarnation of Yeul to go with him.

Noel was designed by Tetsuya Nomura, who did the face, and Yusuke Naora, who designed the rest of the body and clothes. When designing his clothes, Naora took into account he was a hunter, while his swords were based on a Final Fantasy III illustration by Yoshitaka Amano. Noel's weapon, which changes from two swords into a javelin, was designed so that the character could have both short and long-range attacks. In an interview, Toriyama said that Noel was intended to be a grave young man burdened by a heavy responsibility, but also, because of his upbringing on Gran Pulse, with a naivety about the world Serah and Lightning are used to, and certainly about Cocoon. Yoshinori Kitase, in an interview with Impress Watch, described Noel as one of the Final Fantasy series' few "orthodox" protagonists. Noel is voiced by Jason Marsden in English and by Daisuke Kishio in Japanese.

=== NORA ===
NORA (ノラ, Nora) is a resistance group led by Snow Villiers and is an acronym for "No Obligation, Rules or Authority". The team consists of Gadot (ガドー, Gadō), Snow's childhood friend; Lebreau (レブロ, Reburo), another friend who runs a local bar in Bodhum for gathering monetary resources; Maqui (マーキー, Mākī), a teenager who provides mechanical assistance; and Yuj (ユージュ, Yūju), a young man obsessed with fashion. Gadot and Lebreau join as guest characters when Snow is leading NORA to battle the PSICOM soldiers during the opening level. Eventually, they meet up with the party before they enter Orphan's cradle. The group reappears in Final Fantasy XIII-2, living in the town of New Bodhum and acting as its neighborhood watch. Due to not traveling through time, the members of NORA are dead by the events of Lightning Returns. In the supplementary novel Final Fantasy XIII Reminiscence: tracer of memories, it is revealed that all the members were reincarnated in the new world.

Gadot, Lebreau, and Maqui were designed by Nao Ikeda, who based their clothing on the athletic clothing styles of basketball, beach volleyball, and snowboarding, respectively. Gadot, Lebreau, Maqui and Yuj are respectively voiced by Zack Hanks, Anndi McAfee, Daniel Samonas and Jeff Fischer in English, and by Biichi Satō, Yū Asakawa, Makoto Naruse and Wataru Hatano in Japanese.

== Antagonists ==
=== Galenth Dysley/Barthandelus ===
Galenth Dysley (ガレンス・ダイスリー, Garensu Daisurī) is the Primarch (ruler) of the Sanctum government in Cocoon and serves as the main antagonist of Final Fantasy XIII. His true form is Barthandelus (known as Baldanders (バルトアンデルス, Barutoanderusu) in the Japanese version), the lord sovereign of the Cocoon fal'Cie whom the fal'Cie deity Lindzei created. Dysley aims to summon the Maker, a term for a creator god associated with Bhunivelze who created Lindzei, back into their world. This plan involved using the l'Cie-forged beast Ragnarok to destroy Cocoon with the countless deaths from the crash to cause Etro's Gate to manifest in the physical world. He even goes so far as to use anti-Pulse propaganda to instil fear in the citizens of Cocoon. The first attempt, the War of Transgression, fails as a result of Etro's intervention. In the battle of Cocoon, Dysley manipulates Cid to cause a coup d'état in Cocoon. When confronted by the team in Orphan's Cradle, Dysley plays on their emotions with illusions of Serah and Dajh before the party mortally wounds him as Barthandelus. His body is then assimilated into Orphan. Dysley is voiced by S. Scott Bullock in English and Masaru Shinozuka in Japanese.

=== Orphan ===
Orphan (オーファン, Ōfan) is a wheel-like, sun-elemental fal'Cie who serves as the chief power source of Cocoon, kept within Eden. Both Orphan and the Cocoon fal'Cie had been planning its demise in order to reunite with their creator in the aftermath of the resulting mass genocide of every human in Cocoon. After Orphan assimilates the dying Barthandelus, it fights the party, and seemingly transforms the Cocoon-based members into Cie'th. It then proceeds to torture Fang and Vanille to invoke Ragnarok. However, Lightning and the others gain a new focus for a peaceful world and force Orphan into its true form before the party defeats it in the game's final battle. Orphan's shell is voiced by Julia Fletcher and S. Scott Bullock in English, and by Mie Sonozaki and Masaru Shinozuka in Japanese. Its true form is voiced by Michael Sinterniklaas in English and by Hiro Shimono in Japanese.

=== Yaag Rosch ===
Yaag Rosch (ヤーグ・ロッシュ, Yāgu Rosshu) is a Lieutenant Colonel of the Sanctum who acts as a secondary antagonist in Final Fantasy XIII. He serves as the director of the government's military branches and pilots his personal fighter, the Proudclad. Despite questioning the Sanctum's motives, he follows their orders for the sake of Cocoon's people. He first meets Lightning's party in Palumpolum, resulting in a fight that he loses. The party escapes with help from the Cavalry. When the party escapes from the Palamecia, Rosch attempts to attack piloting the Proudclad, but fails as a result. Rosch again confronts Lightning's party in Eden, but he survives the fight and escapes. He and his troops go into Eden to defeat Orphan, only for his troops to be turned into Cie'th. He confronts the party once more while there, only to lose. After the battle, Rosch reveals to the party that he knew the fal'Cie were in control, but felt their guidance and anti-Pulse propaganda was the best for Cocoon without realizing their true intentions. Rosch orders the Sanctum troops to suspend l'Cie operations and allows the party to enter Orphan's Cradle to save Cocoon before sacrificing himself by using a grenade, unleashing an explosion which annihilates him and the monsters pursuing the party. Rosch is voiced by Jon Curry in English and Hiroki Tōchi in Japanese.

=== Jihl Nabaat ===
Jihl Nabaat (ジル・ナバート, Jiru Nabāto) is a minor antagonist in Final Fantasy XIII, a Lieutenant Colonel of the PSICOM branch who serves as Galenth Dysley's subordinate and commands the airship Palamecia. She was responsible for taking Dajh from Sazh so the Sanctum can determine his Focus. Later, using Dajh to lead her to Sazh in Nautilus, Nabaat plays on Sazh's emotions by revealing Vanille's part in his son becoming a l'Cie with the intention of killing Vanille, but her attempt fails and she captures Vanille and Sazh. Nabaat enrages Sazh through her intent to use Dajh as a memorial before detaining them aboard the Palamecia. Lightning's group later infiltrates the Palamecia and rescues Sazh and Vanille, much to Nabaat's dismay. When the party confronts Dysley, Nabaat prepares to fight them to cover Dysley's escape. Dysley states that Nabaat has outlived her usefulness and kills her using his fal'Cie magic. Despite her death, Nabaat's spirit regains physical form during the events of Final Fantasy XIII-2 as a combatant in the Coliseum. Nabaat is voiced by Paula Tiso in English and Mie Sonozaki in Japanese.

=== Caius Ballad ===
Caius Ballad (カイアス・バラッド, Kaiasu Baraddo) appears in Final Fantasy XIII-2 as its main antagonist. He hails from the distant past prior to the War of Transgression, having been a former Pulse l'Cie who became the Guardian of the seeress Paddra Nsu-Yeul. At some point, to protect her and her city from an invading army, Caius sacrificed himself by transforming himself into a Bahamut Eidolon. Etro, touched by his sacrifice, gave him her heart, the Heart of Chaos, so he could become Yeul's eternal guardian and the living repository for her visions. However, this gift soon turns into a curse, as seeing Yeul die repeatedly makes him hateful towards Etro. As a result, he attempts to condition Noel to kill her before deciding to enter Valhalla and kill her personally. As Serah and Noel encounter past versions of him during their journey, Caius uses his knowledge of the timeline to create various paradoxes they deal with while he battles Lightning in Valhalla. After barely managing to defeat her, Caius has a final battle with Noel and Serah. Eventually, after being defeated in his Eidolon form and with Noel still refusing to kill him, Caius manages to force Noel's blade through himself, destroying Etro's heart. Though he seemingly dies, he is later seen in the game's secret ending, seated on Etro's throne and saying that he and Yeul can begin their lives in the "new world".

Lightning Returns reveals that the contradicting desires of Yeul's incarnations have brought Caius back, with his body and soul uniting with chaos and thus making him beyond salvation. Lightning fights him in the remains of Valhalla before learning of Caius's condition, along with his intention to stay in Nova Chrystalia to serve as custodian of the new Unseen Realm to guide the dead. Caius is seen after Bhunivelze's defeat, where he explains that the Yeuls intend to become the new goddess of the dead. As a final act before the new Unseen Realm is completely formed, Caius allows the final incarnation of Yeul to depart with Noel for the new world.

Caius Ballad was designed by Yusuke Naora, with the final design being selected from several ones offered. Watanabe called Caius a "unique" villain for the series, due to his almost-noble goal of saving Yeul from her perpetual curse of early death and reincarnation, as opposed to many other Final Fantasy villains who sought destruction. His role in XIII-2 earned the character the title of "Best Villain" in Game Informer's 2012 RPG of the Year awards. Caius is voiced by Liam O'Brien in English and Hiroshi Shirokuma in Japanese.

=== Adam ===
Proto fal'Cie Adam (デミ・ファルシ＝アダム, Demi Farushi Adamu; Demi fal'Cie Adam) is a minor antagonist in Final Fantasy XIII-2. It is a man-made fal'Cie created to re-levitate Cocoon. However, utilizing a crossroads between time periods, it is able to use the AI that helped design it to kill the humans and seize control of the city of Academia. When Noel and Serah fight Adam, it uses the crossroads to continually rebuild itself after each defeat. However, Serah uses the crossroads to send a warning to Hope, who halts the project in his time, erasing Adam from existence.

=== Bhunivelze ===
Bhunivelze (ブーニベルゼ, Buniberuzei) is the key deity of the Final Fantasy XIII universe and the main antagonist of Lightning Returns. He plays a key role in the world's history, being the creator of the world's main deities and the indirect creator of humanity and the fal'Cie. While the attempts by the Cocoon fal'Cie to revive him in Final Fantasy XIII failed, Bhunivelze awakens in the aftermath of Final Fantasy XIII-2 when Granpulse is being transformed into Nova Chrysalia from mingling with the Unseen Realm. Though Bhunivelze attempts to stop corruption, he gradually accepts that Nova Chrysalia is beyond saving and makes Lightning the savior of the souls of those still alive in preparation for the birth of a new world. His wish is to purge humanity of their memories by destroying the dead, leaving them free of burdens and knowing only happiness in the new world. While having the Order of Salvation carry out his plans for humanity, he makes Hope his host and conditions Lightning to become Etro's replacement. When Lightning chooses to rebel and thwarts the Order's mission, allowing the souls of the dead to mingle with the living, Bhunivelze decides to destroy all souls along with his new world, intending to create his own version of humanity. Lightning fights Bhunivelze, wounding him and freeing Hope's soul before uniting with the souls of humanity to defeat him. Lightning later states that if he returns, humanity will defeat him once again.

Bhunivelze's physical form for Lightning Returns was designed by Toshitaka Matsuda. Matsuda made his design elaborate and detailed as a representation of both Nova Chrysalia and the entire universe. This design motif carried over to him being fused to the arena floor during the final battle. The character is voiced by Daniel Riordan in English and Yūki Kaji in Japanese (the latter being Hope's voice actor due to Bhunivelze absorbing parts of Hope's soul in order to speak).

== Other characters ==
=== Dajh Katzroy ===
Dajh Katzroy (ドッジ・カッツロイ, Dojji Kattsuroi) is the 6-year-old son of Sazh Katzroy. Four days prior to the start of Final Fantasy XIII, Sazh visited a store to get a baby Chocobo for him. After Dajh becomes a l'Cie, Jihl Nabaat captures him and uses him to sense the energy of "Pulse" to track down other l'Cie. After finding his father, he turns to crystal, having completed his Focus. Dajh, along with Serah, returns to normal after Orphan's defeat and reunites with Sazh. In XIII-2, Dajh is separated from his father after they are sucked into the Void Beyond, a limbo between time periods. After Sazh reunites with him, the two travel to Academia and witness the unleashing of chaos after Etro's death. In Lightning Returns, Dajh's soul has fragmented and he falls into a coma. As his father is driven into despair trying to awaken him, Dajh becomes frightened of waking. Lightning manages to retrieve the fragments of his soul and rekindle Sazh's happiness, enabling Dajh to awaken.

Dajh was originally meant to be a nine-year-old, but was made younger by designer Nao Ikeda to gain more sympathy with the player, saying she wanted someone the player would "want to pick up and [give] a hug". In an interview with Famitsu, Ikeda said that Dajh's afro hairstyle was meant to be a baby version of Sazh's own hair. Dajh is voiced by Connor Villard in English and by Shotaro Uzawa in Japanese in XIII. In Lightning Returns, he is voiced by Andre Robionson in English and Wataru Sekine in Japanese.

=== Cid Raines ===
Cid Raines (シド・レインズ, Shido Rainzu) is a supporting character in Final Fantasy XIII. He is a Sanctum Air Force Brigadier and the leader of the Sanctum's Calvary branch. Like Rosch, Cid has doubts about the Sanctum in its current state, and believes that Cocoon should be run by its people. After recruiting Fang after she gets separated from Vanille, Cid has her and his subordinate Rygdea capture Snow and use him to find the other l'Cie under the impression that the Calvary would back them up. He also helps the party escape from Yaag Rosch in Hope's home town and stages a rescue mission on the Palamecia to save Sazh and Vanille. However, it is later revealed that Cid is actually a Cocoon l'Cie, aiding the group under orders from Dysley before acting on his own to kill them for the safety of Cocoon's people. After being defeated, Cid returns to Dysley to replace him as Primarch under orders to create chaos in Eden, Cocoon's capital city. After the Calvary confronts him when the party invades Eden, Cid tells Rygdea to kill him and end his misery. In Lightning Returns, the dead use Cid's visage to communicate with Lightning. Through Cid, they tell her the truth about the Order's plans and that Vanille can save the dead, though in doing so she would be rebelling against Bhunivelze. XIII is the second Final Fantasy game to feature a Cid character in an antagonistic role, after Final Fantasy XII. Cid is voiced by Erik Davies in English and by Yuichi Nakamura in Japanese.

=== Rygdea ===
Rygdea (リグディ, Rigudi) is a supporting character from Final Fantasy XIII. He is a member of the Sanctum Cavalry, a unit loyal to Cid Raines and secretly opposed to the fal'Cie. He extracts Snow and Serah in her crystal form after Anima made them l'Cie, and helps save them again when the l'Cie are ambushed at Hope Estheim's house. During the battle on Cocoon with Cid's appointment as Primarch, Rygdea takes command of the Cavalry and confronts Cid, then ends up fulfilling Cid's request to end his life as a l'Cie. Although he does not appear in XIII-2, the novels Fragments Before and Fragments After confirm that he survives when the rest of the Cavalry is turned into Cie'th. He eventually exposes the Sanctum's secrets and establishes the Academy with Bartholomew Estheim. Rygdea is voiced by Josh Robert Thompson in English and Yasuyuki Kase in Japanese.

=== Bartholomew and Nora Estheim ===
Bartholomew Estheim (バルトロメイ・エストハイム, Barutoromei Esutohaimu) and his wife Nora (ノラ, Nora) are Hope's parents and supporting characters in Final Fantasy XIII. Prior to the first game's events, Nora took Hope to see a festival in Bodhum, and the two ended up being selected for the Purge. When Snow and his group NORA free the refugees, Nora chooses to join their efforts. During an attack, Nora saves Snow from a missile attack but a counterattack leaves her gravely injured and she requests him to get her son home before dying. When Hope, Lightning, and Fang arrive at Hope's house with a wounded Snow, Bartholomew allows them to take shelter there, managing to forgive Snow for failing to save Nora as he fulfilled her final wish to get Hope home. When the Cavalry help the four escape, Hope restrains his father, making him appear to be a victim and thus protecting him from Cocoon's authorities. After the fall of Cocoon, Bartholomew helps set up the provincial government after the fall of the Sanctum. He dies of natural causes several years later. A thousand years after Cocoon's fall, the spirits of Nora and Bartholomew appear to Hope after Lightning frees him from Bhunivelze's control. Nora is voiced by Komina Matsushita in Japanese and Mary Elizabeth McGlynn in English, while Bartholomew is voiced by Masaki Aizawa in Japanese and André Sogliuzzo in English.

=== Paddra Nsu-Yeul ===
Paddra Nsu-Yeul (パドラ＝ヌス・ユール, Padora Nusu-Yūru) is a Pulsian seeress from the city-state of Paddra on Gran Pulse prior to the time of the War of Transgression, having written Analects relating to the event, Etro, Ragnarok, and the Eidolons. The novel Fragments After shows that Yeul was the first human created, and that her soul does not fade after reaching the afterlife. Etro took pity on her and gave the ability to see the future, called the Eyes of Etro, and enabled her to be continuously reincarnated throughout history. Despite this being well-intentioned, Yeul's ability to see the future becomes a curse, since each vision drains her lifeforce and she consequently always dies in her teens. Because of her fate, Caius Ballad, who had seen her incarnations live and die since before the War of Transgression, makes it his goal to destroy Etro and end time so Yeul would no longer die. Despite this, Yeul remains supportive of Noel and Serah's quest, and it is later revealed that she allowed herself to be reborn to be with Caius. Only one manifestation of Yeul is openly hostile towards the travelers and is resentful of her fate. In Lightning Returns, the versions of Yeul take up residence in the ruins of Etro's temple, with Caius as their guardian. It is revealed that Yeul's constant reincarnation caused her soul to fragment, with each previous life mingling with Chaos and triggering the events of XIII-2. As the world ends, the souls of Yeul choose to stay and become the new goddess of death to restore the cycle of life Etro established. The final incarnation, who shares a strong bond with Noel and wishes for a new life, is allowed to leave and live as a normal human. Yeul is voiced by Amber Hood in English and Mariya Ise in Japanese.

=== Mog ===
Mog (モーグリ, Mōguri; Moogle) is a Moogle and a supporting character in Final Fantasy XIII-2 and Lightning Returns: Final Fantasy XIII. He is from a place called the Ocean of Time, where moogles seem to live. After the events of Final Fantasy XIII, Mog is pulled from his home into a paradox, losing his memories in the process, and eventually finds his way into Valhalla. There, he helps Lightning defeat a Bahamut Eidolon, then is sent with Noel to become Serah's "good luck charm". While traveling with Serah and Noel, he acts as Serah's weapon-to-hand and helps them in their quest. At one point, while resolving a paradox, Mog recovers his memories and is given the chance to return home but chooses to remain by Serah's side. In Lightning Returns, Mog has moved to the Wildlands and become the leader of the last Moogle community to exist in the world. When Lightning meets him, he feels guilty because of Serah's death, but is revived by Lightning's promise to rescue Serah's soul.

Mog was designed by Toshitaka Matsuda, who was asked to make the character into a mascot for the game. He designed Mog in the image of an infant, and redrew it repeatedly until he was satisfied with the balance of features. Mog was originally designed to be Serah's sole companion during XIII-2, but this was changed at a late stage when it was decided that it would clash too much with the game's general atmosphere. Mog's voice proved a challenge for the sound designers in terms of non-verbal answers and noises: eventually, they created several different versions of "Kupo", the Moogle's trademark sound, with one signifying each of Mog's possible moods. At one point, Mog was talking too much in-game and the designers had to go through the game toning down the amount of dialogue he had. In XIII-2 Mog is voiced by Ariel Winter in English and Sumire Morohoshi in Japanese. For Lightning Returns, Mog is voiced in English by Bailey Gambertoglio.

=== Alyssa Zaidelle ===
Alyssa Zaidelle (アリサ・ザイデル, Arisa Zaideru) is a supporting character from Final Fantasy XIII-2. She was originally a young woman from Cocoon involved in the Purge, having helped to hide the ruined city of Bresha with a group of survivors. During the events at the end of Final Fantasy XIII, the roof of their hiding place collapses. Though Alyssa was meant to die, when time becomes distorted and the paradoxes erupted, she is resurrected, though she is haunted by dreams of her true fate. She joins the Academy and works as an assistant to Hope, going into hibernation with him after he initiates the construction of the new Cocoon. Although she is initially supportive of Noel and Serah's quest, she eventually betrays the two to Caius after learning their quest to correct the timeline dooms her to vanish. However, they escape and, while planning to kill Hope, the part of the timeline that brought her back is corrected, causing her to fade from existence. She is voiced by Kim Mai Guest in English and Yōko Hikasa in Japanese.

=== Chocolina ===
Chocolina (チョコリーナ, Chokorīna) is a supporting character that first appears in Final Fantasy XIII-2. Sazh's DLC episode reveals that Chocolina is the Chocobo chick Sazh bought for Dajh before the events of the first game, with him choosing her name after those events. After Sazh is whisked away to Serendipity, she was separated from him and made a wish to help others which was granted by Etro, gaining a human body that can exist across all of time. After that, she serves as a merchant and aids Serah and Noel on their journey. She returns as a supporting character in Lightning Returns, minding the Canvas of Prayers, and also appears in her original chick form during the quest to save Sazh's soul.

Chocolina was originally meant to be a waitress in Serendipity, but her design impressed Toriyama enough that he expanded her role into something akin to a shop clerk, and the director wrote a new backstory and new dialogue for her. Isamu Kamikokuryo said that though Chocolina's jovial manner and scanty outfit at times clashed with the game's overall atmosphere, he felt she was a good inclusion. Chocolina is voiced by Julie Nathanson in English and Seiko Ueda in Japanese.

=== Lumina ===
Lumina (ルミナ, Rumina) is a supporting character in Lightning Returns: Final Fantasy XIII. Initially appearing as a doppelganger of Serah, she is eventually revealed to be an embodiment of Lightning's personal trauma as a child that created a physical form from the Chaos to contain Serah's soul. Lumina meddles in Lightning's journey, aiding her or being a hindrance, before eventually revealing her true identity and integrating back into Lightning's mind once she comes to terms with her need for her friends to help her.

Lumina was designed by Toshiyuki Itahana, who had worked on multiple titles in the Final Fantasy series. Her look has been described as a "Gothic lolita" style. She came about when the team were asking themselves how to portray Lightning's hidden self. Her appearance is a young version of Serah, but her inner feelings reflect Lightning's hidden emotions. Her personality and actions were made to be unpredictable, with her both aiding and hindering Lightning on her journey. In creating her childlike appearance and extravagant movements, the development team tried to make them as realistic as possible. Lumina is voiced by Jessica DiCicco in English and Kanae Ito in Japanese.

== Cultural impact ==
=== Merchandise ===
In conjunction with the game's release, Square Enix produced a lineup of merchandise including jewelry, action figures and other goods related to the characters. Most of the merchandise is released in Japan. The items produced include Lightning's necklace, Snow's necklace, a l'Cie-themed lighter and a l'Cie-themed card case. Three full-colored action figures of Hope, Fang and Odin have also been displayed in the Square Enix Japan merchandise page, along with character posters. To promote the game and its heroine, Square Enix also licensed production of a perfume branded as "~Lightning~ eau de toilette". In 2012, in what Yoshinori Kitase called "a very exciting opportunity", the April issue of Arena Homme+ magazine showed multiple characters from XIII-2 modeling outfits for Prada's spring and summer collections. Characters from the games appeared on the packaging of snacks produced by Ezaki Glico to promote Lightning Returns.

=== Critical reception ===
The characters of Final Fantasy XIII have received mixed and positive opinions from reviewers. Ben Dutka of PSX Extreme said that the voice acting for the characters are "interesting" and that the cast was "a competent one, even if some characters can begin to chafe after a while". He also said that the player "might grow tired of Lightning's gruffness and Vanille's bounciness in the early goings but they begin to show new emotions as [the player] progress[es]". Game Informer, for example, was critical of Vanille's "over-emphatic moans and sighs", while Chad Concelmo, writing for Destructoid, felt that fans "misunderstood" the character and said that he could relate to the character on a personal level. 1UP.com's Jeremy Parish applauded the characters as "the best-defined group of protagonists the series has ever seen" and also praised them for their development in the story. Parish also commented that the characters "worked through their differences and demons and feel like comrades" during the story's development. IGN editor Ryan Clements drew a favorable comparison to the characters of Final Fantasy VI and enjoyed the characters' multi-story approach and the flashbacks in the storyline. Vice writer Aoife Wilson found Fang and Vanille's role in the ending to be one of the greatest Final Fantasy moments. They attributed this to the relationship between the two characters, which they felt was implied to be romantic. GameSpot writers Garrett Martin and Maddy Myers included the relationship between Vanille and Fang in their list of the best love stories in video games, regardless of whether it is romantic or platonic. Adriaan den Ouden of RPGamer said the characters were "fantastic" and also praised the voice acting. However, den Ouden said that in the introduction to the game, the characters "lacked any kind of development for the first few hours [of the game], and the result is a confusing plotline with uninteresting characters that leaves a terrible first impression".

The characters introduced in XIII-2 received a mixed reception, with some praising their inclusion and others saying they were too weak. Ryan Clements felt that the characters seemed to have no clear focus, with the only driving force being the quest for Lightning. VanOrd thought the characters were good, but said that the game focused too much on Serah and Noel, rather than the more engaging characters of Lightning and Caius. Dale North of Destructoid was the most positive, finding the characters very well fleshed out, understandable and well-voiced by the cast. den Ouden thought that the characters alright and well voiced, but "[fell] flat when the actors [had] awkward dialogue to work with". Juba was extremely critical of the characters and their story, seeing the company taking the "weakest" characters and placing them center stage, while the "best" characters, such as Lightning and Fang, were relegated to the background. Parish was disappointed in the character's development, saying that Serah was never given any true power within the game's narrative, and that Noel was under-developed beyond his original premise, with the "stronger" characters from the original game being a noticeable loss. On top of this, he disliked how the two "least liked" characters from XIII (Serah and Hope) were given such large roles. Parkin was especially critical, saying the characters were "irritating or forgettable, full of fuzzy or weak motivations and stuffed with tortuous, posturing dialogue". Despite this, he said that Serah's warmth endowed the game with a comforting atmosphere.

The characters' resolutions in Lightning Returns received much criticism. Marty Sliva of IGN found the writing for the characters uninteresting, and that the game had "forgotten why we ever liked these characters in the first place". VanOrd stated that every character was "defined by the most basic of traits, all of which serve the needs of the plot, rather than the plot flowing from the needs of the characters". He also felt that their dialogue was overly frequent and poorly written. GamesRadar's Ryan Taljonick found Lightning off-putting, and saw the inclusion of the other characters as "more like a ham-fisted attempt at fan-service than a critical plot element". Kotaku's Mike Fahey was also unimpressed both with Lightning and how the other characters had stayed very much the same between XIII-2 and Lightning Returns, with them needing Lightning to move on. Dave Riley of Anime News Network found that the characters had improved slightly over their previous appearances, saying that "dropping the pretense of stoic seriousness transmutes some of the sub-series's most insufferable elements into something marginally more tolerable, especially as it regards its main character".
