= Vanille =

Fictional character of the Final Fantasy series

Oerba Dia Vanille
- Final Fantasy character
- Vanille from Final Fantasy XIII
- First game: Final Fantasy XIII (2009)
- Created by: Motomu Toriyama and Daisuke Watanabe
- Designed by: Tetsuya Nomura
- Voiced by: EN: Georgia van Cuylenburg; JA: Yukari Fukui
- Motion capture: Asami Katsura (XIII)

In-universe information
- Weapon: Fishing rod
- Home: Gran Pulse

Oerba Dia Vanille, (Note: Japanese: ヲルバ＝ダイア・ヴァニラ, Hepburn: Woruba-Daia Vanira; Vanille of the Dia clan from the village of Oerba) also addressed simply as Vanille, is a character from the Fabula Nova Crystallis Final Fantasy video game series by Square Enix, within the wider Final Fantasy series. She first appeared as a playable character and central character in the 2009 role-playing video game Final Fantasy XIII. A resident of the world of Gran Pulse who was once involved in a war with the artificial world of Cocoon, she and others are then chosen by the fal'Cie−a divided race of demigods who rule the worlds of Gran Pulse and Cocoon−to destroy Cocoon. Vanille appears in smaller roles in Final Fantasy XIII-2, Lightning Returns: Final Fantasy XIII, and novellas related to the Final Fantasy XIII series.

Vanille was created for Final Fantasy XIII by director Motomu Toriyama, who made her the game's narrator, and writer Daisuke Watanabe. Her design, created by artist Tetsuya Nomura, changed little over the Final Fantasy XIII games. She is voiced by Yukari Fukui in Japanese, and by Georgia van Cuylenburg in English. The character has seen mixed reactions from journalists, focusing on her appearance and initially-girlish personality, with particularly harsh criticism being levied towards the character's voice in the English localization. Additional commentary has focused on her overall story arc and relationship with fellow character Oerba Yun Fang, praising it as one of the best aspects of the game.

== Concept and creation ==
Vanille, as with the rest of the cast of Final Fantasy XIII, was created by director Motomu Toriyama and scenario writer Daisuke Watanabe, with the overarching theme being "characters at the mercy of a predetermined, unjust fate". Her appearance was designed by recurring Final Fantasy artist Tetsuya Nomura. Due to the story progression, Toriyama wanted a unified point of view, and added Vanille's narration to this end. An element of the character's portrayal in the 2013 sequel Lightning Returns: Final Fantasy XIII was guilt at her actions in the backstory of XIII, leading her to be easily manipulated by antagonistic factions. Her story arc also shared a common thread of emotional burdens with the rest of the cast. Her motion capture actress was Asami Katsura, who "played each and every movement carefully" in the original game.

Standing 161 centimetres (5 ft 3 1/2 in) tall, Vanille was given twin pigtails by Nomura to emphasize her "girlish" personality. When asked to make her outfit different from the people of Cocoon, he decided to go with an ethnic costume design and examined tribal cultures around the world. Specifically taking inspiration from the Himba people of Namibia, he implemented elements such as fine ornaments and a fur around the waist into her design. During development, one of the developers insisted on the concept of Vanille using a yo-yo as her weapon, but Nomura felt the idea was uninteresting and a hindrance. After discussion the developer clarified he wanted a weapon with a string that pulled the enemy, and Nomura gave her a fishing rod as a result. Vanille is a "l'Cie": humans cursed with magical powers and a task to complete. Her crystalline form, the fate of l'Cie who have fulfilled their purpose, was the first to be designed and used as a basis for those of the other characters. Vanille's design changed little in Lightning Returns, with the only addition being a pink-coloured headdress with ornate horns intended to give an impression of divinity.

=== Voice casting ===
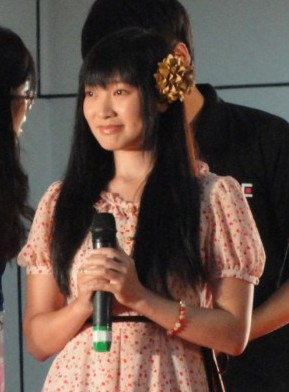
Yukari Fukui voices Vanille in Japanese

Vanille is voiced by Yukari Fukui in Japanese. Fukui, who had previously worked with Square Enix to voice the character Terra in Dissidia: Final Fantasy, stated in an interview in the book Final Fantasy XIII Ultimania Omega that she was offered the role "out of the blue", and went to the audition without even knowing the name of the game until Dissidia staff told her it would be a Final Fantasy title after her performance. When portraying the character she aimed "not to forget to always smile and be energetic and have a positive attitude". She stated the role was a bit challenging, due to Vanille's characterization of secrecy and concern for fellow XIII character Fang. She related these aspects to herself and aimed to portray the character with a positive mindset due to her own experiences. She was told to ad-lib in between lines or during movement to help express the character's innocence, however she was nervous about going off-script and at most ad-libbed onomatopoeias. As the character's narration grew "darker", she deepened her voice gradually to match the tone.

In English she was voiced by Georgia van Cuylenburg. According to an interview with Voice Director Jack Fletcher, the localization team for the game wanted an Australian or New Zealand, due to the use of Icelandic sounding voices in Final Fantasy XII. They wanted the dialogue to sound like "from another country or another world" that had its own "melody that wasn't jarring". Upon hearing Cuylenburg's voice he felt it matched the very specific sound and requirements the Japanese developers had wanted for Vanille. Cuylenburg was given the call two weeks later confirming she had the role after auditioning. Cuylenburg took about six months to get her voice recording done, with four-hour sessions once or twice per week. The voice cast used the Japanese dub of the game for reference, though particularly with her. Unlike the rest of the cast who the voice directors were working to Americanize the portrayal of those characters, Cuylenburg was instructed to stay with the Japanese performance, which lead her to do a portrayal that was higher pitch and peppy. Cuylenburg found it relatively easy connecting with the character because of the similarities in their basic personalities. She also discussed how, like Vanille, she hid her problems behind a perky personality. She also discussed how she portrayed Vanille as a little sister type to Fang. During the first session, Cuylenburg had to learn how to do various sounds that Vanille would incorporate into her dialogue.

== Appearances ==
=== In the Final Fantasy XIII series ===
In the backstory of Final Fantasy XIII, Vanille, together with her childhood friend Oerba Yun Fang, is a resident of the village of Oerba on the world of Gran Pulse. Gran Pulse and the floating artificial world of Cocoon are each controlled by a sect of the "fal'Cie", a race of demigods whose two factions, the "Sanctum" population on Cocoon and the "Pulse" fal'Cie from Gran Pulse, are hostile toward one another. Vanille and Fang are branded as l'Cie by the Gran Pulse fal'Cie Anima. They are destined to become Ragnarok, a monster that will destroy Cocoon and fulfil the fal'Cie's wish to summon their creator, dubbed the Maker, through a mass human sacrifice. When Vanille refuses her task, Fang becomes an incomplete Ragnarok, and the two fall into crystal stasis for five centuries within Cocoon.

Thirteen days before the start of Final Fantasy XIII, she and Fang wake from crystal stasis in the Pulse Vestige holding the fal'Cie Anima, initiating the chain of events that would lead to the Sanctum's Purge. Together with other Purgees of Cocoon including Hope Estheim and his mother, she is rescued by Snow Villiers' group, NORA. After Hope's mother dies during the rescue, she encourages him to follow and confront Snow, and she sees them become l'Cie. After the party splits up, Vanille, along with Sazh Katzroy, resolve to run away from their fate, but both she and Sazh are captured; Vanille reveals she is indirectly responsible for recent events, driving Sazh into a brief emotional crisis. After the two are rescued, Vanille reunites with Fang. On Gran Pulse, Fang regains her memory of becoming Ragnarok, and while initially angry she convinces Vanille to confess the truth and they reconcile. Along with the others they defeat the fal'Cie Orphan, the source of Cocoon's power and orchestrator of the latest attempt to summon the Maker. Upon his death, she and Fang transform into Ragnarok together and form a crystal pillar to prevent Cocoon from colliding with Gran Pulse.

In the novel Final Fantasy XIII-2: Fragments Before, Vanille and Fang remain in crystal stasis within the pillar. From there, the two see everything that is going on, staying unaffected by the changes in the timeline that occur in XIII-2. In Final Fantasy XIII-2, though still held in the pillar, Vanille and Fang appear to help protagaonist Serah Farron escape from an endless dream. At the end of the game, Hope and others rescue them from the collapsing pillar. In an alternate "Paradox Ending" for the game titled "Vanille's Truth", Serah encounters a crystallized Vanille, who remained in Oerba when Fang became Ragnarok and laments she did not apologize to her friend. Serah promises to bring Fang to her.

In Lightning Returns, Vanille and Fang awoke from crystal stasis in Luxerion thirteen years before the game's events, with Vanille gaining the ability to hear the voices of the dead. Because of her power, the Order—a religious organization devoted to the deity Bhunivelze—dubbed Vanille a saint and had her stay in their protective care, confined to the cathedral. She is vital to the Soulsong, a ritual to bring the dead peace at the cost of her life; Vanille wants to go through with it to atone for the deaths she feels she caused, but the Soulsong will destroy rather than save the dead by erasing the living's memories of them. On the day of the apocalypse, Fang along with protagonist Lightning persuade Vanille to stop the ritual and instead use her power to free the dead and enable them to be reborn in a new world. Convinced, Vanille and Fang guide the dead to prepare them for rebirth, saving their souls in turn. Vanille and the others later join Lightning in defeating Bhunivelze's plans to rule over humanity before they journey to the reborn world. Vanille and Fang return in the seventh episode of the follow-up novella Final Fantasy XIII: Reminiscence -tracer of memories-, recounting the events of Lightning Returns to a reporter, and state everyone is content with living in the new world.

=== Promotion and other appearances ===
To promote the game and the character, Square Enix released a wide variety of merchandise utilizing Vanille's image including a clear poster, keychain, drinking glasses, and a small stationary figurine as part of their Trading Arts Mini line. A second poseable figure was later released in early 2010 as part of Square Enix's Play Arts Kai line. Her different incarnations were featured in different runs of the Final Fantasy Trading Card Game. She features as a guest character or is referenced in multiple Final Fantasy mobile projects including Final Fantasy Record Keeper, Pictlogica Final Fantasy, Dissidia Opera Omnia, Mobius Final Fantasy, and Final Fantasy Brave Exvius. Outside Final Fantasy, Vanille was featured as a selectable player avatar in both Kingdom Hearts Mobile and PlayStation Home.

== Critical reception ==
Since her appearance in Final Fantasy XIII, Vanille has received mixed reception, with Push Square writer Sammy Barket bemoaning her presence in its sequel. USgamer writer Samantha Leichtamer criticized Vanille for being annoying, a sentiment that The Gameological Society shared despite enjoying Vanille and Fang's relationship. RPGFan writer Kyle E. Miller criticized Vanille due to her defense mechanisms, while fellow RPGFan writer James Quentin Clark felt she got better as the story progressed. Chad Concelmo, writing for Destructoid, liked her role as narrator and felt she was misunderstood. He found her relatable due to her "annoyingly positive" personality. Matt Sainsbury of Digital Downloaded expressed confusion as to why the character was seen as disliked, calling her his favorite of the game's cast and a "sweet hearted and good-natured girl that goes through some of the most significant changes" of all the game's characters. Writer Mattie Brice regarded Vanille as being one of her favorite Final Fantasy characters due to her "cheerful and energetic" personality, adding that Vanille's femininity, as well as the directions Cuylenburg received, informed her negative reception in part. While Edwin Evans-Thirlwell of Edge felt she was another example of "queasily sexualised infants" in the franchise, he noted the character's "ditzy" personality also betrayed a "mountain of guilt".

On the character's voice, Brice felt that the Australian accent that Vanille and Fang have helped make the characters feel more exotic and emphasize the difference between them and the American-accented protagonists. Jess Kinghorn in an article for PlayStation Official Magazine – UK felt that her Australian accent was used to set her and Fang apart from the rest of the cast as "directorial shorthand to communicate their displacement in time", and was a better example to illustrate this aspect than "having the pair spout Ye Olde English". Nightmare Mode writer Big Shell felt that Cuylenburg was the perfect fit for the role, as both Cuylenburg and Vanille mask parts of their identity to assimilate with a certain culture. They didn't take issue with Vanille's voice as much, as they recognized Vanille as "pseudo-American-pretending-to-be-Australian-pretending-to-be-American accent" due to their own experiences having to assimilate. However, some were more critical of her portrayal, with GameSpot's Kevin VanOrd calling Vanille a "incessantly irritating waif" whose "superbubbly voice and high-pitched monosyllabic chirps exceed tolerable limits", even in a genre known for such characters. Commenting on reactions to her performance, Georgia Van Cuylenburg stated she tended to receive very positive or very negative reception, and while she understood some of the negative reactions she was particularly disheartened by some of the reviews due to it being the first time she received such extreme feedback, finding VanOrd's to be particularly harsh.

=== Analysis ===
Journalist Natalie Flores described Vanille as a "subversion of the happy girl archetype" due to her utilization of a bubbly facade to mask "the cynicism and darkness that lurks underneath". In an article for Fanbyte titled An Ode to Final Fantasy XIII's Oerba Dia Vanille she expanded upon these thoughts, stating that while Final Fantasy XIII took several attempts to "click" for her she enjoyed Vanille's character almost immediately, feeling an affinity towards her appearance, attire and high-pitched voice. She noted that while it was hard argue against the notion that Vanille is the worst character of XIII's main cast, Flores described her as "perhaps even one of the most flawed main characters in the three-decades-old franchise". While the character manipulates and lies to get what she wants and protect those close to her, using her "empathetic, cute, and bubbly" aspects to disarm others, this also leaves Vanille infuriated. Flores cite that she is constantly underestimated by the men around her, and was often shown unaware of how to proceed. However, Flores argued that these traits made her Vanille a woman worth looking up to, due to the contradictions of her character, and her contrast against many female characters in fictional media, and Vanille's acceptance that she will make mistakes constantly. She emphasized the character's influence upon her again in a later article for the website, lamenting that while she could see Vanille were some of the most well written women in games, she hadn't felt that way about later female characters in Final Fantasy for some time.

Jérémie Kermarrec in the book La Légende Final Fantasy XIII described Vanille as one of the most serious characters in the XIII series, noting that some interpreted her character as an immature coward while others saw her with admiration for her refusal to destroy Cocoon, and considered her "ultimately very human" in terms of this ambiguity. Karmarrec further praised the character's positive front despite her awareness of the events surrounding the first game's story, and her companion's own animosity towards the inhabitants of Gran Pulse. He however lamented that possibly due to the character's guilt she grew very little during the course of the subsequent games and related media, despite how well developed he found her characterization and the attention to detail in her design in Final Fantasy XIII.

Flores additionally noted Vanille's relationship with Fang also allowed her to relate to the character "as a queer person", noting that while the characters were never stated to be in a relationship their closeness, willingness to defend each other, and were "one of the first examples — if not the first example" of two women aware of each other's "most significant flaws, mistakes, and regrets, yet choose to love each other and push each other to be better people regardless", and emphasized the impression it had on her as a young girl. Other sources shared this interpretation, with Vice News writer Aoife Wilson calling their sacrifice one of Final Fantasy's greatest moments and stating "even if only ever hinted at, a gay female relationship is kind of a big deal for Final Fantasy. Or any big gaming franchise, for that matter". GameSpot staff regarded Vanille and Fang's relationship "platonic or otherwise" as one of the best love stories in video games, further stating it may be "the only glimpse of human warmth in this otherwise ice-cold adventure". Cuylenburg noted that she performed Vanille as a younger sister type, but enjoyed the romantic interpretations regardless.
