= Lightning (Final Fantasy) =

Fictional character of the Final Fantasy series

Claire "Lightning" Farron
- Final Fantasy character
- Lightning in Final Fantasy XIII
- First game: Final Fantasy XIII (2009)
- Created by: Motomu Toriyama
- Designed by: Tetsuya Nomura; Isamu Kamikokuryo (XIII-2)
- Voiced by: EN Ali Hillis; JA Maaya Sakamoto
- Motion capture: Naho Nakashima

In-universe information
- Weapon: Gunblade
- Home: Cocoon

Lightning (Japanese: ライトニング, Hepburn: Raitoningu) is a character from the Fabula Nova Crystallis Final Fantasy video game series by Square Enix, within the wider Final Fantasy series. She first appeared as a playable character and the main protagonist in the 2009 role-playing video game Final Fantasy XIII, in which she is a resident of the artificial world of Cocoon. After her sister Serah is declared an enemy of Cocoon, Lightning attempts to save her and is chosen by divine powers to destroy Cocoon. Lightning reappears as a supporting character in Final Fantasy XIII-2, acting as protector of the Goddess Etro. She is the sole playable character in Lightning Returns: Final Fantasy XIII, wherein she sets out to save the people of her dying world. Outside the XIII series, Lightning has been featured in multiple Final Fantasy games and has cameo appearances in other video games.

Lightning was created by Motomu Toriyama, the director and scenario writer of XIII, and designed by regular Final Fantasy artist Tetsuya Nomura. The design goal was a character who was less feminine than previous Final Fantasy heroines in both appearance and personality. Aspects of her early design and personality were later altered, or transferred to other characters. After XIII, Lightning's design was revised several times to reflect her role and development in each game, particularly in Lightning Returns. Her real name in Japanese, Éclair Farron, was originally a placeholder. Because of her first name's association with a type of pastry, it was changed to "Claire" in other countries.

Lightning has received mixed commentary from critics, with focus on her cold personality, which was compared to that of Final Fantasy VII's protagonist Cloud Strife. She was criticized for her relative absence in XIII-2. Her role in Lightning Returns met with mixed reception; some critics saw her as underdeveloped and unlikable, while others found her better developed and more human than in previous games. Lightning later appeared on lists, compiled by video game publications, of the best characters in the Final Fantasy series and in video games as a whole. She has been received favorably in polls of public opinion by Famitsu, Square Enix, and other organizations.

== Character design ==
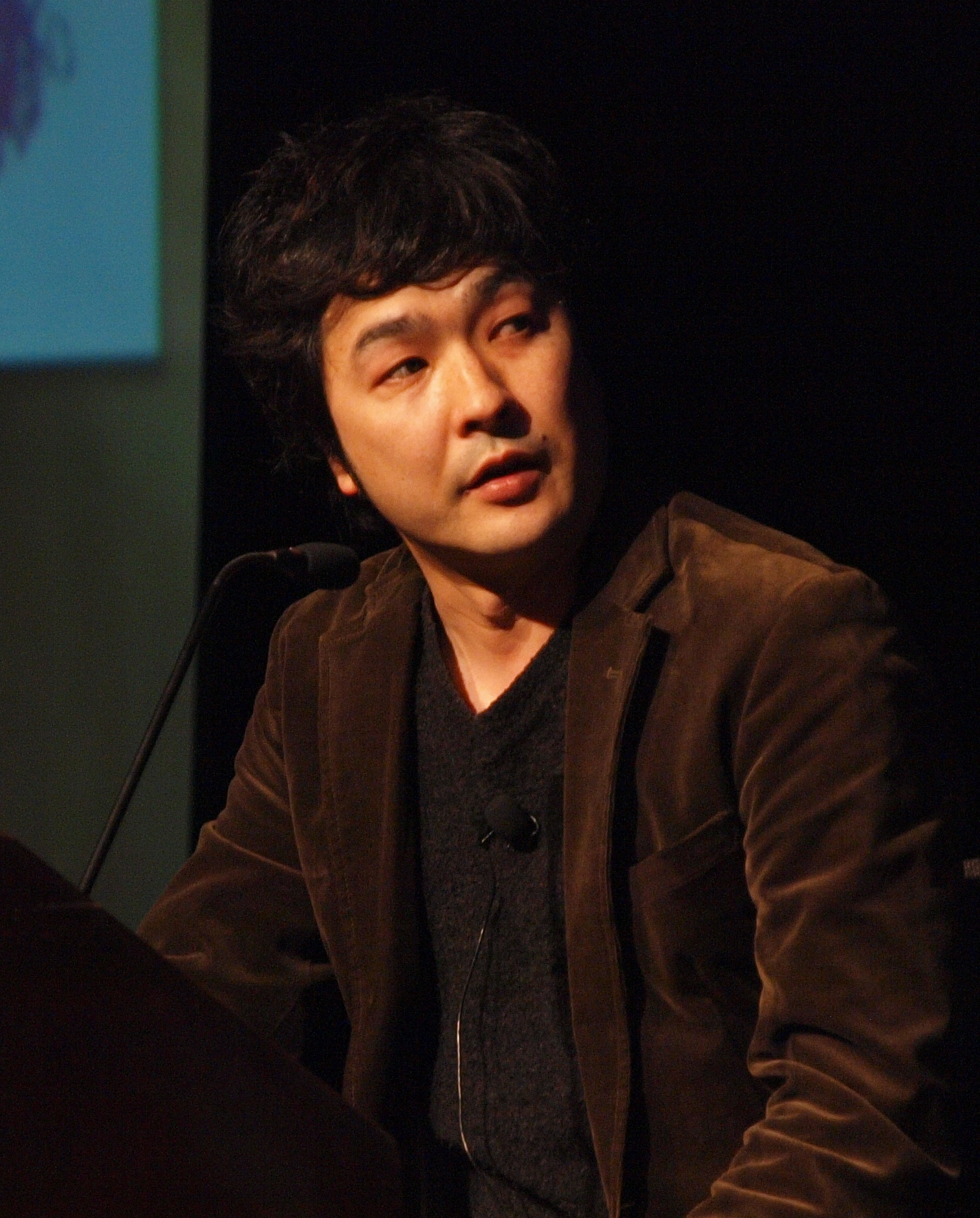
Motomu Toriyama was responsible for most of Lightning's character traits.

Lightning was created by Final Fantasy XIII director Motomu Toriyama. Her character design was by regular Final Fantasy artist Tetsuya Nomura. Nomura said multiple designs—including some by staff members other than himself—were considered for Lightning, while Toriyama has claimed that Nomura's first draft "looked so cool and strong that there was no need for any retakes". Because of the graphical capacities of Final Fantasy XIII's prospective platforms, Nomura was able make Lightning's design more detailed than his previous work, highlighting her cape and facial features. Commenting on an early form of her design, Nomura described her as a "cool character", defined as serious and unforgiving. Despite this, the feminine elements in her design to keep player empathy. Characteristics from early designs included blond or silver hair and Asian-looking facial features. Her final art was made less Asian, and her hair color changed to pink. Lightning's final hair color and hairstyle were intended to reflect her femininity, and to counterbalance her athletic body. Creating her promotional CG render was fairly easy due to the number of details available for her appearance and outfit.

Lightning's real name is Éclair Farron (エクレール・ファロン, Ekurēru Faron) in Japanese and Claire Farron in English. During the early stages of production, Lightning's name was Averia: "Éclair" was used to keep this name secret, but was eventually chosen as her official name. Her English name, Claire, was chosen because the name "Éclair" is closely associated with a type of pastry. The name "Lightning" was not chosen by Nomura but by other members of the development team. Nomura had wanted to abandon the tradition of naming Final Fantasy protagonists after weather events, and was surprised by the choice. Several models of Lightning's house were constructed for XIII but were removed due to space issues. Her weapon in XIII, the Blazefire Saber (known as Blaze Edge (ブレイズエッジ, Bureizu Ejji) in the Japanese version), mirrors the ability of the game's Eidolon summoned monsters to transform into animal-, human- and vehicle-like shapes. Lightning's Eidolon, a version of the summon Odin, was intended to appear like a father figure and present Lightning as a knight on horseback. In later XIII games, Odin was developed into a friend to whom Lightning could show her deeper feelings.

Due to global demand and the development staff's desire to further Lightning's character, development began for a sequel to XIII. The game tackles the question of whether Lightning is happy after the events of XIII. Even before a sequel was greenlit, Toriyama had wanted to create a truly happy ending for the character. Lightning's outfit in XIII-2 was designed by Isamu Kamikokuryo. He worked from a rough sketch by Nomura of how Lightning should appear. Nomura "fought hard" to create the draft design. The outfit was redone several times by Kamikokuryo: a qipao and a science fiction-inspired design were both discarded because they clashed with the game's atmosphere. The final design was inspired by the valkyries of Norse mythology. The outfit was meant to reflect the environment around Lightning. It features a feather motif to represent Lightning's light, delicate side and her growing powers. She was depicted as having transcended her human limits, making it difficult to depict her as a normal person.

Her outfit in Lightning Returns was designed by Nomura. He was told by Toriyama to create something representative of her final battle, with "strength" as the main guideline. The resultant outfit, which resembles a leather bodysuit, has spinal column patterns on its sleeves and is primarily colored red and white. Nomura later commented that he felt "a strong reaction within [himself]" while creating Lightning's final look. Nomura's design was Kamikokuryo's favorite out of the many outfits created for the character. Her other outfits for the game were designed by Kamikokuryo, Toshiyuki Itahana, and Toshitaka Matsuda. Many of the outfits were inspired by designs of regular Final Fantasy artist Yoshitaka Amano. In addition to the new costumes, Lightning's in-game model was rebuilt from the ground-up. Her breasts were enlarged and several of her outfits were designed to present her in a more feminine way. For the game's epilogue, Toriyama wished for Lightning to appear in an everyday setting and normal clothes. The team considered ending the game with Lightning either meeting or speaking with her allies, but Toriyama wished the story to begin and end with her alone. He has claimed that Lightning, with her solo role in Lightning Returns, was the Final Fantasy series' "first female protagonist". (Note: Director Motomu Toriyama's full quote: "We feel that every person within the party is a main character, but we feel Lightning is very impactful as the main female protagonist in the Final Fantasy series. Not only is she the first female protagonist, she is very powerful, cool, calm, and collected. So we believe that is another attractive feature of hers". This official statement addressed the common claim that Final Fantasy VI's Terra was the first female protagonist, but it does not address Final Fantasy X-2 or Final Fantasy XIII itself. According to this official statement, Square Enix identifies Lightning as the first female protagonist, without specifying whether that refers to the female protagonist in a single character title or conventional definitions of female protagonists.)

=== Influences ===
Toriyama wanted Lightning to be a type of female character previously unseen in Final Fantasy games, one with an athlete's body and a less feminine nature. His guideline to Nomura was to make her strong, beautiful, and "like a female version of Cloud Strife from Final Fantasy VII". Commenting on the resemblance, Toriyama stated that the similarities between the characters only extend to their cold personalities and their military backgrounds, and that otherwise "Lightning really [is] her own person". Nomura compared the two shortly before the Japanese release of Lightning Returns, saying that he had "desired for her to be carefully developed and loved for a long time, like Cloud." Toriyama has said that, among the characters he had been involved in creating, Lightning was his favorite female character from a video game, alongside Yuna from Final Fantasy X and Yoyo from Bahamut Lagoon.

=== Personality ===
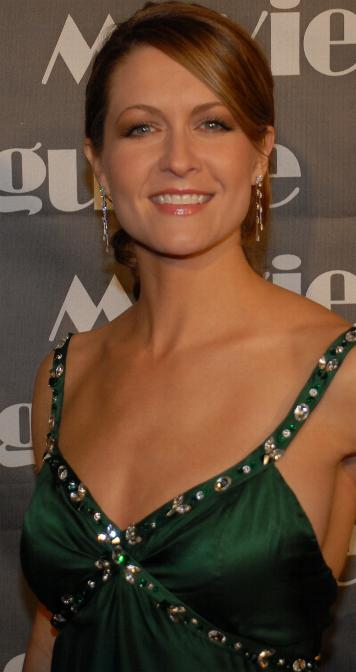
American actress Ali Hillis voices Lightning in her English appearances.

In contrast to other characters in the Final Fantasy series, whose personality traits were molded to fit a story, Toriyama conceived Lightning's basic personality before XIII's narrative had been finalized. She has a cold demeanor, which was meant to clash in an entertaining way with the outspokenness of Snow Villiers. Nomura commented that Lightning has "a strong element of mystery about her character". She originally had a flirtatious aspect to her personality, which was transferred to Oerba Yun Fang when Fang was changed from male to female. Daisuke Watanabe, writer for the XIII trilogy, paid particular attention in the original game to fleshing out Lightning's non-romantic relationship with Snow, and to showing her development as a person while protecting Hope Estheim.

For Lightning Returns, the developers wanted to portray Lightning in several different lights, in contrast to her static personalities in prior appearances. One of their highest priorities was to make Lightning a character who had lost much in her life and become deeply vulnerable as a result. Designer Yuji Abe elaborated that, because of her losses and newfound vulnerability, Lightning came across as darker, slightly numbed to her surroundings, and "like a puppet, like someone who doesn't quite have her real self inside". He elaborated that this effect shows "the kind of vulnerability she has, and it's the point from which she starts to change afterward". The decision to expand her personality in this way was originally suggested by producer Yoshinori Kitase, who was concerned that Lightning's coolness in previous games had made it difficult for players to bond with her. Lightning's motion capture actress across the XIII games was Naho Nakashima. She described the experience as enjoyable and ultimately emotional, describing Lightning in 2013 as "a precious existence" for her.

Across her speaking appearances, Lightning is voiced by Ali Hillis in English and Maaya Sakamoto in Japanese. Sakamoto was impressed by Lightning, whom she called "cold" and "strong". She was asked to portray Lightning's strength while showing hidden vulnerabilities. Voicing Lightning was initially strange as she was used to gentler roles such as Aerith Gainsborough, a central character in Final Fantasy VII and its companion media. Commenting on the difficulty of balancing Lightning's depiction as a woman and a trained warrior, Kitase noted that Sakamoto's acting helped to bring out Lightning's femininity. Hillis was given the role of Lightning after speaking a few of the character's lines during audition, and was then given a book about the Final Fantasy XIII universe, which she found a little "overwhelming" when she read it. One of the challenges Hillis faced was recapturing the emotion and energy of Sakamoto's Japanese performance in the character's English rendition. Hillis described her main priority across the series as portraying "every single layer of who [Lightning] was as a person", working with staff to make her seem like a real person. Hillis felt that Lightning's character became more sarcastic and battle-hardened by the events of Lightning Returns.

== Appearances ==
=== Final Fantasy XIII series ===
Lightning in XIII-2 and Lightning Returns. Over the course of the series, Lightning's appearance was redesigned to reflect her changing roles and evolving personality.

Lightning lives with her sister Serah within Cocoon, an artificial world above the planet Gran Pulse. The two worlds are controlled by sects of the fal'Cie, a race of demigods whose two factions, the "Sanctum" population on Cocoon and the "Pulse" fal'Cie from Gran Pulse, are hostile toward one another. In Final Fantasy XIII: Episode Zero: Promise, a novel set before the events of XIII, it is revealed that Lightning and Serah's parents died when their children were young. Lightning resolved to become her sister's protector, but neglected her in the process. She resents Snow's romantic relationship with Serah and the anti-government activities of his group NORA. Lightning discovers too late that Serah has been branded as a l'Cie—a human cursed with magical powers and a task to complete—by the Gran Pulse fal'Cie Anima: Lightning initially thinks that Serah is lying to get her approval to marry Snow. When Serah is captured by Anima, Lightning volunteers herself for the Purge, a forced relocation of citizens believed to have come into contact with Anima, to save her sister.

In Final Fantasy XIII, Lightning reaches Anima alongside Snow, Hope and other Purge survivors. Serah turns to crystal when they arrive, and before it is destroyed Anima marks them as l'Cie. Skeptical of Snow's resolve to save her sister, Lightning abandons them and ends up traveling with Hope. During their time together, Lightning inadvertently summons Odin and unknowingly supports Hope's plan to kill Snow as she protects and mentors him. Throughout the game, Lightning struggles to deal with her nature as a l'Cie, her anger at being made Cocoon's enemy, and her guilt at disbelieving Serah's story. Overcoming her issues, she acknowledges Snow's relationship with Serah and his faith that they will restore her. When the party kill the Sanctum fal'Cie Orphan to save Cocoon, allies Vanille and Fang sacrifice themselves to form a crystal pillar to prevent Cocoon from colliding with Gran Pulse, while the rest including Lightning are freed of being l'Cie. Final Fantasy XIII: Episode I, a short novel set immediately after XIII, shows Lightning uneasy about whether her battle is over or not. She leaves to save Fang and Vanille, first giving her blessing to Snow and Serah's marriage.

In Final Fantasy XIII-2, Lightning has disappeared, and all but Serah believe that she died with Vanille and Fang to save Cocoon. In reality, Lightning was brought to Valhalla, capital of the Unseen Realm ruled by the Goddess Etro. Etro's intervention to remove the party's l'Cie brands distorted time and erased Lightning from history after Cocoon's fall. Lightning chooses to stay in Valhalla and atone of the deaths she caused as a l'Cie by protecting the dying Etro from Caius Ballad, an immortal man with a grudge against the goddess. Lightning eventually asks Serah and Noel Kreiss to help her stop Caius from ending time, which he plans to do by releasing a supernatural energy dubbed "chaos" into the mortal world. Serah and Noel travel forward in time to fix distortions in history caused by Caius, and Serah eventually dies when history is restored. In the DLC episode Requiem of the Goddess, Lightning is defeated by Caius and loses hope after learning of her role in Serah's death. Lightning is comforted by Serah's spirit, who asks not to be forgotten. Vowing to preserve Serah's memory, Lightning turns to crystal, immunising her against the chaos unleashed by Etro's death which merges the two realms.

In Lightning Returns: Final Fantasy XIII, five centuries after the previous game's events, Lightning is revived by the god Bhunivelze. As the world is on the brink of ending, Lightning is chosen as the Savior, a spiritual guide for humanity, which has ceased to age due to the influence of chaos. In return for Lightning's help, Serah will be resurrected. Aided by Hope, Lightning frees her former allies of emotional burdens, reunites with Odin in the form of a white Chocobo, and frequently crosses paths with Lumina, the physical manifestation of Lightning's suppressed vulnerabilities. Upon learning that Bhunivelze is manipulating her for his own goals, Lightning plans to betray him after he has finished building the new world. When the end of the world arrives, Lightning fights Bhunivelze, who has been shaping Lightning into Etro's replacement. Although prepared to fulfill her new role and abandon her human life, Lightning instead chooses to call for help and accept Lumina as a part of herself. Everyone she has saved, including Serah, unites with her and defeats Bhunivelze. Lightning then witnesses the creation of a new universe, and goes with the rest of humanity to their new home. In the epilogue, she is seen traveling to reunite with one of her friends. (Note: During the cited Famitsu interview, Daisuke Watanabe said that he wrote both the ending of Lightning Returns and the novella Final Fantasy XIII Reminiscence: tracer of memories to give readers freedom to speculate on who Lightning was meeting. The most he says is that she is going to meet someone she has not seen for a long time.)

=== Other appearances ===
Beyond the XIII games, Lightning has appeared in several spin-offs within the Final Fantasy franchise. In the fighting game Dissidia 012 Final Fantasy, Lightning is one of the warriors summoned by the goddess Cosmos. She was meant to debut in Dissidia Final Fantasy, but the idea was scrapped as Final Fantasy XIII had yet to be released and Square Enix did not want to reveal her abilities ahead of time. Lightning has three alternate outfits in the game. She again appeared as a playable character in the 2015 arcade title, and its home console version Dissidia Final Fantasy NT.

The character was featured in a series of special player events in Final Fantasy XIV: A Realm Reborn. Players who participated in the events received gear and outfits modeled after items, weapons and clothing from the XIII games. Lightning also plays a role as an ally in World of Final Fantasy, appearing in her Lightning Returns outfit. Lightning was also featured in both Japanese and international versions of the mobile title Mobius Final Fantasy as part of a special story event titled "Lightning Resurrection".

Lightning features as a playable character representing the Final Fantasy XIII games in the Theatrhythm rhythm game subseries. She is featured, sporting her XIII-2 design, in Final Fantasy Airborne Brigade. Lightning is a playable character in the mobile crossover games Final Fantasy: All the Bravest and Record Keeper, a powered-up character form in Final Fantasy Explorers, a chibi figure in Final Fantasy in Itadaki Street Mobile, and a character card in Final Fantasy Artniks. In response to speculation about her continued role in the Final Fantasy series after Lightning Returns' release, Kitase clarified in 2013 that she would appear in spin-off titles, but that her role in the main series had ended.

Outside the Final Fantasy franchise, Lightning features in a minigame in Kingdom Hearts Re:coded, and in a collaboration between the Final Fantasy series and Puzzle & Dragons alongside other established series characters. Versions of her outfit from XIII may be worn by protagonist Aya Brea in The 3rd Birthday and a character from arcade shooter Gunslinger Stratos 2. Sakamoto, who portrays both Aya and Lightning, voiced Aya to sound like Lightning when the outfit is equipped.

=== In merchandise and promotion ===
Lightning has been featured in Final Fantasy XIII-themed merchandise produced by Square Enix. The two pieces directly inspired by the character are necklaces and a mild perfume called "Lightning eau de toilette". Action figures of Lightning in her three main iterations were produced by figurine company Play Arts Kai. Cards depicting the character are available in the Final Fantasy Trading Card Game. Lightning appears in a live-action PlayStation commercial titled "Michael", alongside characters such as Nathan Drake, Kratos and Cole McGrath. An actress portrayed the character at the Final Fantasy 25th Anniversary Event during Asia Game Show 2013. She was portrayed again in a Japanese live-action/CGI TV commercial for Lightning Returns: Final Fantasy XIII. In April 2012, Lightning and other characters from XIII-2 were used to showcase Prada designs in a 12-page section in the male fashion magazine Arena Homme +. To promote Lightning Returns, Lightning was featured on the packaging of snacks produced by Ezaki Glico. She later was used in a 2015 Louis Vuitton advert, and a 2017 Chinese Nissan commercial alongside Snow.

== Reception ==
=== Critical response ===
While Final Fantasy XIII was in development, Todd Ciolek of Anime News Network was unimpressed by Lightning, whom he called a "businesslike blank". Reviewing the finished game, Ciolek opined that Lightning is initially "far too distant and cold" and lacked other personal traits, though he admitted that she became a more appealing lead character by the game's end. Wesley Yin-Poole of VideoGamer.com simply referred to Lightning as a female version of Cloud. 1UP.com's Jeremy Parrish commented that, barring scenes in which Lightning shows a thoughtful side, she is "your typical, sullen [Square Enix] protagonist". Conversely, GameSpot's Kevin VanOrd called Lightning a "likeable, strong-willed beauty". Martin Robinson of IGN UK said that Lightning "instantly endears herself" in comparison with Hope or Snow, but that her generic backstory made her less relatable overall. GamesRadar's Carolyin Gudmundson was unenthusiastic, calling her "one-dimensional and boring" due to a lack of original elements in her narrative. Gamasutra writer Christian Nutt believed that Lightning's relationships with the cast added humanity to the narrative.

For XIII-2, Game Informer's Joe Juba was disappointed that Lightning had been transferred to a supporting role in favor of Serah and Hope, whom he saw as weaker characters than Lightning. Simon Parkin of Eurogamer found that the story suffers without the driving force of Lightning's single-minded determination. VanOrd was disappointed that Lightning and Caius Ballad have relatively limited screen-time, since they come off as stronger characters than the protagonists.

In Lightning Returns, Juba criticized Lightning's lack of personal growth during the narrative, and IGN's Marty Sliva felt that her increased coldness makes her "downright unlikable". VanOrd argued that Lightning is not "interesting in and of herself" and that her role as a vessel for plot developments made it more difficult for players to connect with her. Parish, writing for USGamer, stated that Lightning had become "downright apathetic", further noting that her lack of personality clashed with the in-game ability to dress her in costumes. By contrast, Parkin commented that certain side quests, such as herding sheep or retrieving a girl's doll, helped to humanize Lightning and make her likable. Similarly, Destructoid's Dale North found that the costumes and dialogue lighten her character: he argued that these elements make her less "flat and lifeless now, which is a big improvement". Dave Riley of Anime News Network felt that Lightning's stoic attitude, although out of place in previous games, fit her role as a god's servant in Lightning Returns. Tech Reviewer, in a feature about the portrayal of female characters in video games, was impressed with the character's depth and portrayal. Matthew Prichard of The Escapist had mixed thoughts, finding her well written and escaping many common archetypes for female characters, but disliked the revealing nature of her costumes.

=== Popularity and analysis ===
In a VideoGamer.com list of the ten best Final Fantasy characters, Lightning was placed sixth; writer Yin-Poole found her interesting in her own right despite her similarities to Cloud. In 2011, IGN ranked Lightning among the best characters in the Final Fantasy series, saying that she demonstrated that "a delicate balance can exist between strength and tenderness, even in the midst of ... incredible acrobatic feats". Lightning was ranked eighth in a similar list by GameZone's Heath Hooker: points of praise were her visual appearance and determination, which made her "one of the strongest female leaders of the Final Fantasy series" in Hooker's opinion. In Game Informer's list of top ten heroes of 2010, Lightning was ranked eighth and praised as the only protagonist in Final Fantasy XIII who "seemed capable of taking on the corrupt government of Cocoon": another comment was that her "no-nonsense approach to her mission makes her the game's standout hero".

In 2010, Lightning placed 34th in a Famitsu poll regarding the most popular video game character in Japan. At the 2013 Dengeki PlayStation Awards, she was voted best video game character of the year for her appearance in Lightning Returns. She came first in a Microsoft poll to determine the most popular character of the Final Fantasy XIII games. In 2014, readers of IGN voted her the best character in XIII. At PAX Prime 2013, she took third place in a list, compiled by journalists and game developers, of the top female characters in Western and Japanese role-playing video games. In a Famitsu poll from 2017, Lightning was voted as the second most wanted character fans expect to be featured in Square Enix's Kingdom Hearts franchise, being surpassed only by Noctis Lucis Caelum from Final Fantasy XV.

In the book The Music of Nobuo Uematsu in the Final Fantasy Series Richard Anatone describes Lightning's original theme as one that transcends gendered generalizations and helps to show her personality, making her stand out within the main cast even if none of them were the sole leading character. In ConsumAuthors: The New Generational Nuclei the character is described as the ideal figure for a woman in the modernity. Interactive Storytelling for Video Games: Proven Writing Techniques for Role describes her as a mother figure trying to take care of her sister, contrasting against her initial stoic portrayal in the opening sections.
