= Yukarin =

Yukarin may refer to:

- Yukari Fukui, a Japanese voice actress and former radio DJ
- Yukari Tamura, a Japanese voice actress and singer
