= Chocobo =

Fictional species of bird

- Final Fantasy race
- Chocobo artwork by Tetsuya Nomura for Final Fantasy VII
- First appearance: Final Fantasy II (1988)
- Created by: Koichi Ishii

Chocobo (/ˈtʃoʊkoʊboʊ/; Japanese: チョコボ, Hepburn: Chokobo) are a fictional species created for the Final Fantasy franchise by Square Enix (originally Square). A galliform bird commonly having yellow feathers, they were first introduced in Final Fantasy II (1988), and have since featured in some capacity in nearly every Final Fantasy title, usually as a means of transport. Chocobos or chocobo-themed characters have played story roles in multiple titles, notably in Final Fantasy V and XIII. A recurring Chocobo also acts as protagonist of the Chocobo spin-off series.

The chocobo was created by designer and artist Koichi Ishii, inspired by childhood memories of raising a chick to adulthood. In Final Fantasy III it was going to be part of a trio of mascot characters alongside the Moogle, but the third planned mascot was scrapped. The chocobo has gone through multiple redesigns for each entry, with a notable contributing artist being Toshiyuki Itahana. In addition to Final Fantasy, the character has made cameo appearances in other video games. The chocobo has remained an icon of the series, recognised and noted by journalists and fans.

== Creation and development ==
The chocobo was created by Koichi Ishii, an artist and game designer who worked on the original Final Fantasy (1987) and Final Fantasy II (1988). The origins of chocobos came from Ishii's childhood. When he was at elementary school, he bought a chick at a festival market and formed a strong bond with it. One day while he was away at school, his parents decided they could no longer care for it and gave it to a neighbour who kept chickens. Ishii was very upset when he found out, and kept the memory of the chick into his adult life. All through development of Final Fantasy, Ishii wanted to create an animal companion character. A challenge to himself was creating a character that could not speak but would still be capable of creating an empathic connection with the player. The chocobo's design was inspired by the middle stage of his chick before it matured into a chicken. The name "Chocobo" was inspired by the Chocoball, a popular confection in Japan created by Morinaga & Company.

He created the first Chocobo designs in ten minutes during a lunch break, imagining chocobos as a near-constant companion players would connect with, similar to the horse Thunderbolt from Kōya no Shōnen Isamu. When Ishii presented the chocobo concept to series creator Hironobu Sakaguchi, they were initially rejected, but Sakaguchi eventually included them in Final Fantasy II in the much-reduced role of temporary mounts. Ishii was annoyed by their reduced role both in Final Fantasy II and Final Fantasy III (1990). This anger prompted him to include the chocobo in its intended companion role in the debut Mana title Final Fantasy Adventure (1991), which was the first project where he had creative control. He considered that version to be the original Chocobo, which appeared in other properties around that game. Ishii originally envisioned the chocobo as a non-vocal character, communicating through its movements and thus being true to its feelings. Going forward, the chocobo sported a distinctive "Kweh" call. The chocobo was going to be one of a trio of mascot characters alongside the Moogle and a third animal creation that ended up being scrapped.

Though Ishii never intended the chocobo to recur within the series, positive fan reception caused it to become a fixture going forward. It underwent multiple redesigns based on the setting of each game, such as Final Fantasy XV (2016) where it was designed to appear realistic while still having exotic flourishes. They were initially left out of the world design of Final Fantasy XVI (2023), but staff protests prompted scenario writer Kazutoyo Maehiro to incorporate them. A notable narrative use of chocobos was in the opening section of Final Fantasy Type-0, where a chocobo was gunned down and their owner was unable to save it, setting the game's darker tone. A recurring element in games featuring the chocobo is a titular musical theme, created for Final Fantasy II by Nobuo Uematsu and remixed or redone in subsequent entries. For the remixes he chose, Uematsu always selected a genre which had the same number of syllables as "chocobo".

The most notable version features in the long-running Chocobo spin-off series, which share a protagonist in the form of a male Chocobo. This incarnation of Chocobo was designed by Toshiyuki Itahana, who created a more cute design that would fit into a roguelike game design while also appealing to a wider market than the "sleek" designs of Chocobos from the main series. His early attempts to make a more monster-like version did not work due to the planned tone, which focused on a light-hearted story. He also created versions of Chocobo that had him wearing Final Fantasy job outfits. Recurring artist Yoshitaka Amano created a concept for the Chocobo summon from Final Fantasy III, though this design differed markedly from its usual appearance. The in-game sprite, while a typical chocobo design, reused colors from the Amano artwork. Due to his workload at the time, he had no memory of his chocobo design.

== Appearances ==
Across the series, chocobos are portrayed as galliform birds, often with yellow feathers but also coming in other colors such as black. Their primary role, particularly in earlier titles, was acting as transportation for the party across the world map. From Final Fantasy VII onwards, Chocobos have appeared in more substantial roles within racing minigames, and as summoned monsters. Other pieces of media within the series, including Final Fantasy: The Spirits Within, have featured chocobo imagery in some way. Several spin-off titles including Final Fantasy Tactics and Final Fantasy XIII-2 have included chocobos as playable or support characters. In Final Fantasy XI and XIV, chocobos were included in player-focused activities, featuring them as both pets and means of transport.

Some chocobos have acted as individual characters. The first was Boco, a chocobo from Final Fantasy V who accompanied the protagonist Bartz. Ishii was pleased with this interpretation, feeling that the developers of V had understood his intentions with the Chocobo character. Boco was referenced through a Chocobo character within Final Fantasy IX, which featured multiple callbacks to earlier Final Fantasy titles. Another notable Chocobo character is Chocolina from Final Fantasy XIII and its sequels XIII-2 and Lightning Returns. Originally a chocobo chick bought as a pet by character Sazh Katzroy, she is granted the ability to take human shape by the Goddess Etro, and takes on the role of a merchant and quest giver. The chick was originally going to play a role in combat in Final Fantasy XIII, but this was scrapped. The summoned monster Odin, who serves Final Fantasy XIII protagonist Lightning, is put in the form of a chocobo during the events of Lightning Returns, with Lightning able to ride him in one of the game's areas. The developers did this to allow players to see Lightning's emotional connection with Odin. Both Boco and Chocolina, alongside other chocobo-related characters, were featured in World of Final Fantasy.

Chocobos also feature in a dedicated self-titled Chocobo subseries. Beginning in 1997 with Chocobo no Fushigi na Dungeon, a spin-off of the Mystery Dungeon franchise, the series spans nearly twenty entries across game consoles and mobile platforms within multiple genres. While one of the most prolific Final Fantasy subseries in terms of games released, relatively few have been published outside Japan. Final Fantasy XIV featured a chocobo character called Alpha in a questline surrounding a machine called Omega, with its design referencing Itahana's artwork and its inclusion being a homage to Chocobo's clashes with Omega within the Chocobo subseries.

Within Square Enix's library, chocobos also saw playable cameo appearances in Tobal 2, Legend of Mana, and Dragon Quest X. It also cameoed beyond the company in Everybody's Golf, and Assassin's Creed Origins as part of a crossover with Final Fantasy XV. Chocobo merchandise has been released, including a rubber duck, a plush baby Chocobo, and coffee mugs. Square Enix designed a chocobo character costume for the release of Chocobo Tales.

== Reception ==
The Chocobo has been referred to or considered to be a series mascot by fans and journalists since its introduction, becoming synonymous with the series's visual identity. In a feature on the series for Retro Gamer, Samuel Roberts referred to the Chocobo as an iconic creature since its introduction in Final Fantasy II. Anthony John Agnello, writing for The Escapist, praised the Chocobo as an adorable mainstay within both the main series and its spin-off series and media. In a feature for The Guardian, the Chocobo was 9th in a list of 18 video game animal characters.

In 2008, Boco was voted by Joystiq as the 20th most desired character to be placed in the Final Fantasy fighting game Dissidia: Final Fantasy. In 2007, the Chocobo was listed by IGN as one of the most likely Square Enix characters that could appear in the Super Smash Bros. series, comparing them to the Slime from Dragon Quest and saying that "the Chocobo could be an excellent enemy for Yoshi". For Final Fantasy VII, the site Anime News Network regarded the caring for chocobos as an appealing sidequest due to the benefits that come from it and thus wanted the remake to have it.

== See also ==
- Music of the Chocobo series
- Cactuar
- Moogle
