= Yukari Fukui =

Japanese voice actress and model (born 1982)

- 福井 裕佳梨
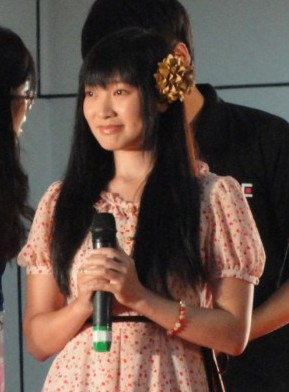
- Born: 28 October 1982 (age 43); Hiratsuka, Kanagawa Prefecture, Japan
- Occupations: Actress; voice actress; singer
- Years active: 1997–present
- Spouse(s): Kenji Yamamoto (m. 2016; div. 2017) unknown (m. 2023)
- Musical career
- Genres: J-Pop; Anison
- Instrument: Vocals
- Years active: 1999–present
- Labels: Pony Canyon (1999); ULF Records (2003); Konami (2007–2008)

Yukari Fukui (福井 裕佳梨, Fukui Yukari; born October 28, 1982) is a Japanese actress, voice actress and gravure idol known by the nickname Yukarin (ゆかりん) in Japan.

== Filmography ==
=== Anime ===
- 7 of Seven as Nanarin
- Dragonaut -The Resonance- as Saki Kurata
- Gundam Reconguista in G as Raraiya Monday
- Highschool of the Dead as Shizuka Marikawa
- Kare Kano as Rika Sena
- Kenkō Zenrakei Suieibu Umishō as Mirei Shizuoka
- Kill la Kill as Sukuyo Mankanshoku
- Mouse as Yayoi Kuribayashi
- Macademi Wasshoi! as Falce The Variable Wand
- Mushishi as Fuki
- Petite Princess Yucie as Cocoloo
- Re: Hamatora as Mio (Episode 1)
- School Rumble as Sarah Adiemus
- Strawberry Panic as Kagome Byakudan
- Saint October as Natsuki Shirafuji
- Tengen Toppa Gurren Lagann as Nia Teppelin
- Umi Monogatari: Anata ga Ite Kureta Koto as Warin

=== OVA ===
- FLCL as Junko Miyaji
- School Rumble OVA as Sarah Adiemus
- Top o Nerae 2! as Nono
- Air Gear as Kururu Sumeragi

=== Video games ===
- Baldr Force EXE as Segawa Minori
- Dissidia: Final Fantasy as Tina Branford
  - Dissidia 012 Final Fantasy as Tina Branford
  - Dissidia Final Fantasy NT as Tina Branford
  - Dissidia Final Fantasy Opera Omnia as Tina Branford, Oerba Dia Vanille
  - Dissidia Duellum Final Fantasy as Tina Branford
- Final Fantasy Explorers as Tina Branford
- Final Fantasy XIII as Oerba Dia Vanille
- Final Fantasy XIII-2 as Oerba Dia Vanille
- Lightning Returns: Final Fantasy XIII as Oerba Dia Vanille
- God Eater (and its extended versions God Eater Burst and God Eater Resurrection) as Shio
- Luminous Arc 2: Will as Rina
- Rune Factory 3 as Sia
- True Tears as Gion Inoue
- Tartaros Online as Nagi
- Toukiden 2 as Benizuki
- World of Final Fantasy as Tina Branford
- Arknights as Raidian

=== Internet radio ===
- Diebuster Web Radio Top! Less (onsen (音泉) 2005.10.4- reset date every Tuesday)
- School Rumble nigakki weekend (onsen (音泉) 2006.4.－ reset date every Friday)

=== Music ===
- Anime Toonz Volume 4: Yukari Fukui
