= Final Fantasy XIII-2 =

2011 video game

- North American Xbox 360 cover art, featuring Lightning
- Developer: Square Enix 1st Production Department (Note: Additional work by tri-Ace; ported to Windows 10 by Virtuos.)
- Publisher: Square Enix
- Director: Motomu Toriyama
- Producer: Yoshinori Kitase
- Designer: Yoshiki Kashitani
- Programmer: Yoshiki Kashitani
- Artist: Isamu Kamikokuryo
- Writer: Daisuke Watanabe
- Composers: Naoshi Mizuta; Masashi Hamauzu; Mitsuto Suzuki
- Series: Fabula Nova Crystallis; Final Fantasy
- Engine: Crystal Tools
- Platforms: PlayStation 3; Xbox 360; Windows
- Release: December 15, 2011: PlayStation 3, Xbox 360; JP: December 15, 2011; NA: January 31, 2012; AU: February 2, 2012; EU: February 3, 2012; Windows; WW: December 11, 2014
- Genre: Role-playing
- Mode: Single-player

Final Fantasy XIII-2 (Note: Japanese: ファイナルファンタジーXIII-2, Hepburn: Fainaru Fantajii Sātiin Tsū) is a 2011 role-playing video game developed and published by Square Enix for the PlayStation 3 and Xbox 360. It was released in 2011 in Japan and 2012 in North America and PAL regions, and was ported to Windows in 2014. XIII-2 is a direct sequel to the 2009 role-playing game Final Fantasy XIII and part of the Fabula Nova Crystallis subseries. It includes modified features from the previous game, including fast-paced combat and a customizable "Paradigm" system to control which abilities are used by the characters, and adds a new system that allows monsters to be captured and used in battle. The game's plot features a heavy time travel element, allowing the player to jump between different times at the same location or different places at the same time. Lightning, the protagonist of the original game, has disappeared into an unknown world. Her younger sister Serah Farron and Noel Kreiss journey through time in an attempt to find her.

Development of Final Fantasy XIII-2 began in early 2010 and lasted about one and a half years. The game was unveiled at the Square Enix 1st Production Department Premier in January 2011. Many of the key designers remained in their roles from the previous game, and developer tri-Ace was hired to help with the game's design, art, and programming. The development team wanted to exceed Final Fantasy XIII in every aspect while making the story's tone more dark and mysterious than the previous game. The game builds upon the Paradigm Shift battle system used in XIII and includes a less linear overall design.

Final Fantasy XIII-2 received critical acclaim in Japan and generally positive reviews from Western video game journalists. Though praised for its gameplay, lack of linearity, and graphics, the game's story was criticized as weak and confusing. The game was the fifth-best selling game of 2011 in Japan, and sold 3.1 million copies worldwide by January 2013. A sequel, Lightning Returns: Final Fantasy XIII, was released in 2013 in Japan and 2014 worldwide.

The game was added to Xbox One backward compatibility along with its predecessor and sequel in November 2018. It is also Xbox One X Enhanced, allowing it to display in 4K Ultra HD. In November 2021, support for FPS Boost on Xbox Series X/S was added allowing it to run at 60 frames per second.

== Gameplay ==
=== General navigation ===
Final Fantasy XIII-2 is a role-playing video game sequel to Final Fantasy XIII. As in the previous game, the player controls their on-screen character through a third-person perspective to interact with people, objects, and enemies throughout the game. The player can also turn the camera around the characters, providing a 360° view. XIII-2 has a world rendered to scale relative to the characters; instead of a caricature of the character roaming around miniature terrain, as found in the earlier Final Fantasy games, every area is represented proportionally. The player navigates the world on foot or by chocobo, large flightless birds that appear regularly in the Final Fantasy series. The game world is divided into multiple regions and time periods. The player can visit a region in multiple time periods and multiple regions at the same time period. For example, the region of Oerba can be reached in the years 200 and 400 AF, while the Sunleth Waterscape and Augusta Tower regions can be visited in the year 300 AF. Some regions, because of plot points within the game, have alternate versions of themselves; for example, two versions of the Academia region in the same year can be accessed once the plot has made the second version available. Connecting all these regions is the Historia Crux, which the player can access at will. The game's regions are represented as a branching path instead of being accessed linearly. New regions can be unlocked via plot points or by acquiring optional special items and the player may transfer between unlocked regions at any point.

When accessing a previously visited region, the player appears in the location of their last visit. Upon acquiring items called seals, the player can revert regions to their previous statuses to play through them again; regions can be unsealed again at any time. Unlike in the predecessor, the game is automatically saved when the player enter the Historia Crux, as well as at key moments in the plot. The player may also manually save at any time. Instead of accessing stores at save points like in XIII, the player can purchase items from a character named Chocolina, who is found throughout the game. An in-game data log provides a bestiary and incidental information about the world of XIII-2. When talking to characters, the game sometimes begins the Live Trigger system, in which the player chooses their response from several options; these dialogue options are generally not repeatable. The game also occasionally features temporal rifts, in which the player must complete a puzzle to close the rift and continue the game.

=== Combat system ===
The Final Fantasy XIII-2 battle system, with the "Paradigm Shift" option, the Active Time Battle (ATB) bar filling beneath it with four slots and two actions queued, and the three active characters' health and roles displayed. The enemy's name and damage percentage are shown in the upper right corner.

Combat is almost identical to the previous game's version of the series' Active Time Battle (ATB) system, called the Command Synergy Battle system. Under this system, the player selects actions from the menus, such as Attack, Abilities, or Item, and queues them up in the ATB bar. Each action requires one or more slots on the ATB bar, which begins the game with three slots and can be increased over the game to six. The ATB bar continually fills with energy over time; the player can wait for the bar to fill up for the enqueued actions to be performed, or may empty the bar early to perform whatever actions have been charged. The player may also select an autobattle command, which fills the ATB slots with actions chosen automatically. Actions the characters can perform include close-range melee attacks, ranged magical attacks, and other magical actions that evoke healing or shielding abilities. Actions cannot be performed outside of combat, and the characters' health is fully restored after each fight.

As the player travels through an area, monsters can randomly appear. For a limited time after monsters appear, the player may attack them to gain a combat bonus; after this window expires, the monsters attack the player to begin a regular battle. When the battle begins, the screen transitions from the regular map to a separate battle screen. The player has the option of restarting a battle while in the middle of a fight. Three characters are used in combat—the two main characters and a monster. Monsters must be captured from battles before they can be used, and there are around 150 different monster types available to be collected. Captured monsters act just like the main characters, but can also perform a "feral link" attack that increases the chance of capturing another monster. Either of the two main characters can be selected as the one that the player has direct control over at any point; the other character and the monster are then controlled by the game's artificial intelligence (AI).

Each enemy has a meter, called a Chain Gauge, consisting of a percentage that increases from a base level of 100 when the enemy is struck by attacks or spells. The amount of damage performed by an attack is multiplied by the chain percentage before it is applied to the enemy. Different attacks have different effects; some raise the chain by a larger amount while others give the player longer before the Chain Gauge resets to 100 percent. When the chain counter reaches a preset amount, different for each enemy, the enemy becomes Staggered. In this mode, the enemy has lowered defense and is easily interrupted, and some may even be launched into the air, preventing them from attacking and stopping their ATB gauges from replenishing.

The Paradigm system allows the player to program six different roles, which the characters can assume to perform certain formations in battle in response to specific conditions. The roles consist of Commando, which uses non-elemental attacks to stabilize the Chain Gauge; Ravager, which uses elemental attacks to fill the Chain Gauge; Medic, a White Mage-type role which can heal the party; Saboteur, which can weaken enemies; Synergist, which can strengthen allies; and Sentinel, which has protective abilities. The two main characters can initially assume three roles, but they can learn others at the player's choosing as the game progresses. The player can select which roles the controlled character and the AI characters use while outside or during battle, which is the only way that the player can control the AI characters during a fight. The player can choose only from specific sets of paradigms that the player has set up before the battle. Monsters have only one role; different ones are used when the player switches paradigms. The player selects up to three monsters they wish to use in paradigms outside of battle.

=== Crystarium ===
The Crystarium is a leveling and growth system, making a return from Final Fantasy XIII in an altered form. The system consists of constellation-style representations of the character's weapons and tamed monsters, made up of small and large crystal nodes, which can be accessed from the start of the game. There is one Crystarium system available for each monster and Paradigm role. Crystogen points gained in battle can be used to expand the Crystarium, unlocking bonuses to health, magic, or strength, or provide the characters with new abilities and slots for battle accessories. For the monsters, the bonuses are unlocked with items dropped by defeated enemies.

== Synopsis ==
=== Setting ===
The story of Final Fantasy XIII-2 follows on from that of Final Fantasy XIII, but as is typical for the series, it is unrelated to all other previous Final Fantasy games. In XIII, one of the fal'Cie—a god-like race—transformed a team of six people into l'Cie (servants of the fal'Cie with magical powers and a 'Focus'—an assigned task to be completed within a time limit). The fal'Cie hoped these l'Cie would initiate the end of the world, Gran Pulse, by crashing the floating and inhabited sphere Cocoon into it. At the finale of the game, two of the l'Cie transformed into a crystal pillar to support Cocoon, preventing the catastrophe.

XIII-2 begins three years after the end of XIII. Owing to the collapse of Cocoon's government (the Sanctum), most of Cocoon's inhabitants have moved down to Gran Pulse, and some have learned magical abilities. Over the course of the game, a scientific body called the Academy becomes a new technocratic government. While much of the story takes place in the year 3 AF, the story of XIII-2 jumps between different time periods, and even parallel versions of different places, accessed via the Historia Crux. Much of the game takes place on Gran Pulse and inside Cocoon. Other locations include the Void Beyond, a limbo between time periods, and Valhalla, the capital of the goddess Etro. This place is a realm at the end of time where Etro keeps a dark energy called Chaos from escaping and destroying the timeline.

=== Characters ===
As opposed to the previous game, Lightning (Ali Hillis/Maaya Sakamoto), the main character of XIII, only appears as a supporting character and the game's primary narrator. The two main playable characters are Serah Farron (Laura Bailey/Minako Kotobuki), Lightning's sister and the second narrator, and Noel Kreiss (Jason Marsden/Daisuke Kishio), a young man originally from the distant future. Other characters from the previous game who appear in important roles are Hope Estheim (Vincent Martella/Yūki Kaji), who becomes leader of the Academy, and Snow Villiers (Troy Baker/Daisuke Ono), Serah's fiancé, who set off to find Lightning for Serah. The other main characters from the previous game appear in cameo roles. New characters include Caius Ballad (Liam O'Brien/Hiroshi Shirokuma), the game's primary antagonist; Paddra Nsu-Yeul (Amber Hood/Mariya Ise), a seeress possessing the all-seeing Eyes of Etro; and Alyssa Zaidelle (Kim Mai Guest/Yōko Hikasa), a young girl who works as an assistant to Hope.

=== Plot ===
The game opens in 3 AF, as the Pulse town Serah lives in is attacked by monsters. A stranger named Noel appears to help fight the monsters and claims to be a time traveler from 700 AF. He arrived in her time via Valhalla, where he claims to have met Lightning as she guarded the throne of the weakened Etro. As part of Lightning's transfer to Valhalla, she was erased from the fall of Cocoon onwards (making everyone except Serah forget her being with them on Gran Pulse), and paradoxes have erupted throughout time, warping the timeline. Serah joins Noel in a journey to resolve these paradoxes by removing items and monsters that are out of their original time; she in hopes of finding her sister, and he in hopes of changing the bleak future he comes from. While journeying to 5 AF to resolve a paradox on Cocoon, they meet and help Alyssa, an Academy member and survivor of the Purge, a massacre by the Sanctum at the beginning of Final Fantasy XIII.

Traveling to the ruined city of Paddra in 10 AF, they find Hope leading the Academy, with Alyssa as his assistant. They also find a recording of prophecies made by one of the seeresses of Paddra, who are believed to have died out centuries prior: one fragmented prophecy shows Lightning in Valhalla. Paddra is shrouded by an eclipse, which Noel says is not supposed to happen for several centuries. While Serah and Noel resolve the paradox causing the eclipse, they encounter Caius Ballad, a man Noel knows from 700 AF who opposes their mission, and Yeul, who looks identical to a girl of the same name Noel knew in the future. After resolving the paradox, an alternative timeline appears in which there was never an eclipse. The repaired prophecy shows Caius in Valhalla fighting Lightning and the pillar supporting Cocoon collapsing. Noel claims that this takes place around 400 AF, devastating the human population as well as the world, creating a future where he is the last human in existence. Serah and Noel move on, while Hope and Alyssa work on finding a way to prevent the pillar's collapse.

In 300 AF, the pair find Snow fighting a giant paradox-fueled monster that is dissolving the crystal pillar. After resolving the paradox, which delays the fall of Cocoon until 500 AF, Snow disappears again as an anomaly from another time. The pair then go to the city of Academia on Gran Pulse in 400 AF where they are attacked by the city's AI, which claims they were killed two hundred years previously. Traveling to 200 AF, they discover a paradox whereby a man-made fal'Cie meant to re-levitate Cocoon turned on its creators. Resolving the paradox, Noel and Serah travel to an alternative 400 AF Academia. In this world, the pair find Hope and Alyssa again, who had put themselves in stasis. They explain their new plan to mechanically float a new Cocoon to hold humanity, which Serah and Noel help with before heading to 500 AF Academia. They are betrayed by Alyssa (revealed to be a living paradox doomed to disappear in the corrected timeline) and trapped by Caius in dream-worlds. Before being trapped, Serah meets the spirit of Yeul, who explains that she is the seeress of Paddra, continually reincarnated throughout history, while Caius is her immortal guardian, gifted with Etro's own heart.

Yeul explains that every time the timeline is changed, the resulting shock kills her; Caius has been driven mad by watching her die repeatedly and seeks to end the process by unleashing the Chaos trapped in Valhalla to destroy all time. Serah has the same power, and risks death every time she changes the future. Resolving to go on, Serah breaks free of her dream-world and frees Noel from his, in which he is the last living human after his Yeul dies and Caius leaves for Valhalla. After briefly encountering Lightning, the pair fight Caius, first in 500 AF Academia and then in Valhalla. As they defeat him, he claims to have killed Lightning, then impales himself through the heart on Noel's blade, killing the weakened Etro. When the pair return to Academia in 500 AF, where Vanille and Fang have been rescued from the collapsing pillar and the new Cocoon, named "Bhunivelze", has risen, Serah dies in front of Noel and Hope from the shock of the future changing. A black cloud erupts from the sky as the Chaos that Etro was keeping trapped breaks free. Lightning is then shown in crystal stasis on the throne of Etro's temple. If the player completes all optional parts of the game, they are shown an additional scene in which Caius is on the throne, declaring that the goddess is gone for good, and that Yeul and he can begin a new life freed from their "curse".

== Development ==
=== Production ===
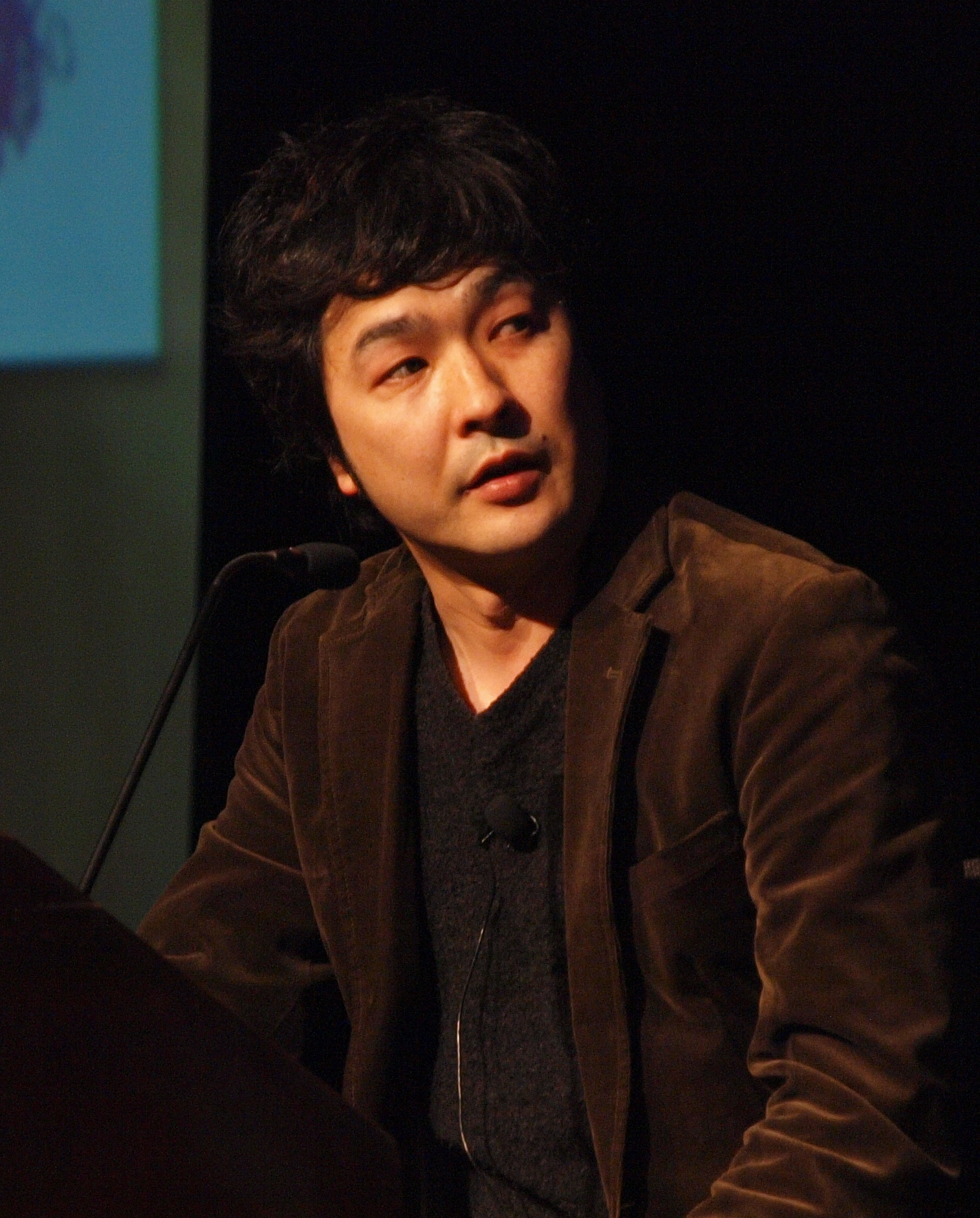
Director Motomu Toriyama at the 2010 Game Developers Conference.

Development of Final Fantasy XIII-2 began around March and April 2010 and lasted about one and a half years. It was carried out by Square Enix's 1st Production Department, a collective name for the teams in charge of the Fabula Nova Crystallis Final Fantasy, Dissidia Final Fantasy and Kingdom Hearts series. Many of the key personnel from Final Fantasy XIII remained in their roles: Motomu Toriyama was director, Yoshinori Kitase producer, Tetsuya Nomura character designer and Isamu Kamikokuryo art director. The game was officially announced at the Square Enix 1st Production Department Premier in Tokyo in January 2011, and released on December 15 the same year.

The troubled development of Final Fantasy XIII that had been caused by the simultaneous creation of the company-wide engine Crystal Tools gave reason to rethink the production process for high-budget games at Square Enix. For Final Fantasy XIII-2, the team consulted the European subsidiary Eidos to more closely adapt a Western approach to game development. As a consequence, monthly schedules and project milestones were introduced to better monitor the staff members' progress. Furthermore, unlike its predecessor, XIII-2 was not entirely developed in-house; Japanese studio tri-Ace was contracted to help out with aspects of the game design, art and programming. This was done to keep the number of internal staff members on the game lower. The contributions of external developers were planned and clearly divided beforehand to achieve a more structured team organization. Concept videos and frequent test playing during production helped constantly engage the staff and keep to the original vision of the game.

Despite its strong sales, Final Fantasy XIII had been criticized on several fronts. Complaints included that the game had been too linear, had not allowed enough interaction with non-player characters, and had not featured enough minigames and puzzles. The developers intended to address these criticisms with the sequel by adding the Historia Crux system, numerous sidequests from non-player characters, and the casino minigame area. Environments were made more explorable and the artists were given more freedom to include their own ideas in the game's locations, in order to rectify the shortcomings of the more artificial seeming settings in Final Fantasy XIII. The developers viewed the changes from XIII to be improvements to the game, rather than simply removing aspects of that game that players disliked. For the structure of side quests and some other aspects such as the abundance of chocobos and the more open environment, the team drew inspiration from Rockstar San Diego's Red Dead Redemption.

=== Writing ===
Toriyama originally envisioned the plot not as a direct sequel to Final Fantasy XIII but instead as taking place 900 years after. However, while creating the backstory for the events in between both eras, it was decided to have the game revolve around time traveling. Toriyama expressed his wish to "create a story where [Lightning] ends up [truly] happy one day" as he considered her emotional state at the end of Final Fantasy XIII doubtful. He also wanted to "see [Serah] take an active part" because her crystal stasis over the course of the predecessor's story did not allow for such a role. Lead scenario writer Daisuke Watanabe thought about how the narrative could be continued in a sequel. Emi Nagashima, also known by her pen name Jun Eishima, had written novellas for Final Fantasy XIII and was consulted early on in development to help come up with the plot for XIII-2.

The narrative was divided into smaller "pieces of drama" similar to a television series rather than one overarching story piece. This was reflected by the game's working title Final Fantasy XIII: Season 2 when the project was first proposed within the company. Unlike Final Fantasy X-2, which had a more cheerful and humorous feel than Final Fantasy X, the staff members wanted the overall tone of Final Fantasy XIII-2 to be serious as well as darker and more mysterious than its predecessor. The original scenario had called for Serah to travel alone with Mog. However, Kitase felt that their dialogue was "quite girly, almost camp and a bit over the top" and resulted in a tonal shift that was too similar to the one from X to X-2. Noel was added to the story to counter this. Watanabe considered scriptwriting for the game's two-character party difficult. With the lack of varied personality traits provided by an ensemble cast, he had to ensure that conversations between Serah and Noel would not be repetitive or unrealistic. Unfamiliar concepts and terms in XIII, such as "l'Cie" and "fal'Cie", were deemed too difficult to understand and hence avoided in the sequel. A story link to Final Fantasy Type-0 via the location Valhalla was planned but later discarded.

=== Art design ===
Based on the much darker tone of Final Fantasy XIII-2 compared to its predecessor, Kamikokuryo decided on surrealism as the main theme for the graphics. The works of Salvador Dalí and Giorgio de Chirico were used as visual references and helped Kamikokuryo strike a balance between photorealism and fantasy-like surrealism. Unlike Final Fantasy XIII, the game had a much tighter schedule allowing for little pre-production. Kamikokuryo hence used photographs instead of self-drawn pictures to explain his setting ideas to the other staff members. For example, a photograph of ruined buildings in the Cuban capital Havana inspired the look of Valhalla. Character design duties were split up: Nomura designed the faces of the new and returning main characters while their clothing was done by other artists. Kamikokuryo drew the final version of Lightning based on a silhouette sketch and suggestions by Nomura. Yusuke Naora took charge of Serah's, Noel's and Caius' costumes, while Hideo Minaba worked on Yeul, Alyssa and the adult version of Hope in the same capacity. The Moogle Mog was designed by Toshitaka Matsuda after he had received a request for a cute and mascot-like character.

=== Music ===
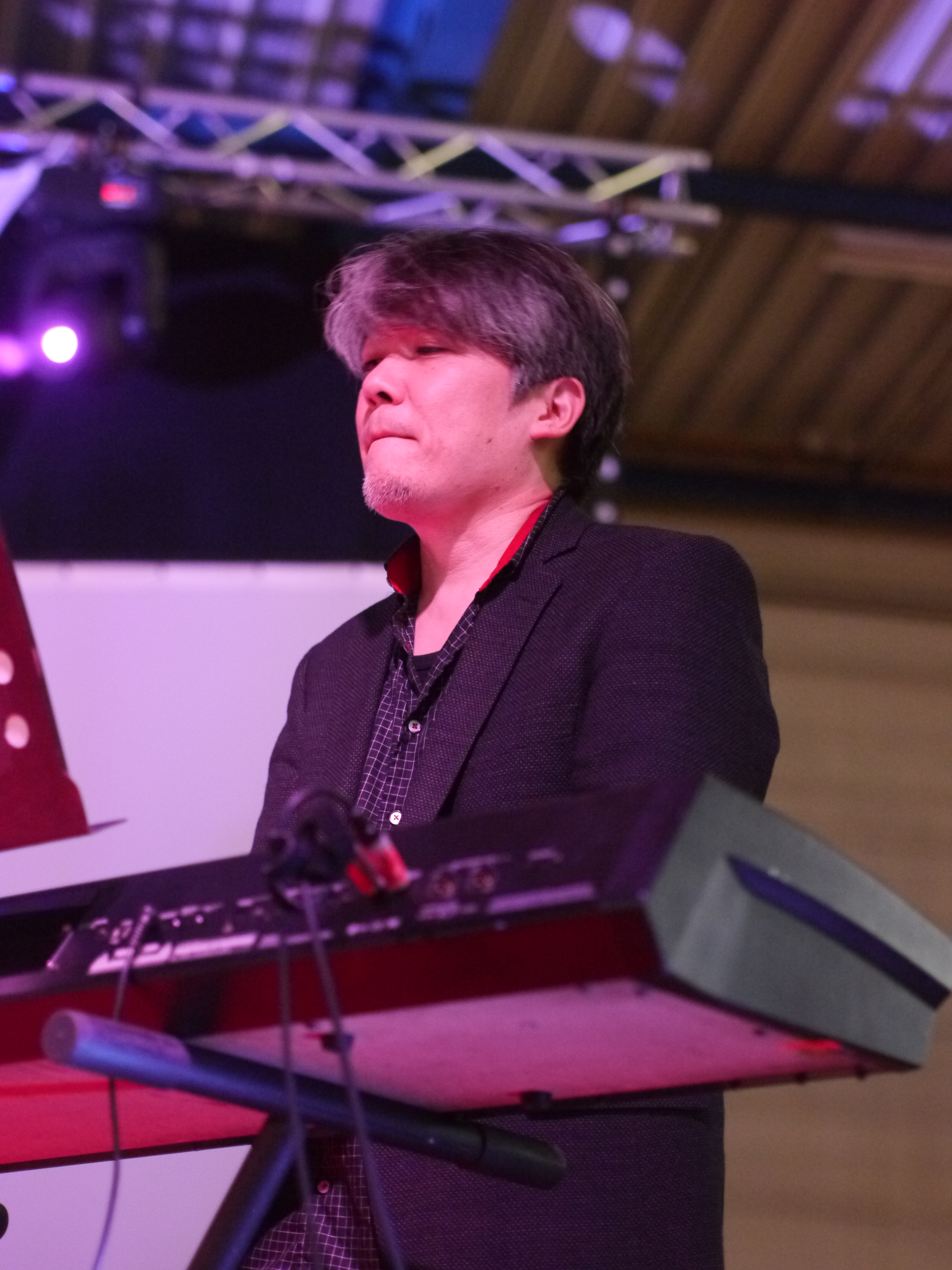
Composer Masashi Hamauzu in 2012.

The music of Final Fantasy XIII-2 was composed by Masashi Hamauzu, Naoshi Mizuta, and Mitsuto Suzuki. Keiji Kawamori coordinated the three artists to ensure their styles meshed well. Hamauzu, who was the sole composer for the music of Final Fantasy XIII, wrote roughly a quarter of the game's tracks, as did Suzuki, while Mizuta wrote nearly half. Prior to this game, Mizuta had worked on the music of Final Fantasy XI, and Suzuki had been a sound director for several Square Enix games and served as an arranger for XIII. The game's director, Motomu Toriyama, wanted the game's soundtrack to have more variety than that of the music in XIII, as well as feature more styles. As a result, the game had three composers rather than just Hamauzu. Toriyama also wished for the music to have "a more edgy sound" and more vocal pieces, so that it would sound "unlike the typical Final Fantasy title". The music incorporates a wide variety of styles, from orchestral and electronic to rap, hip-hop, jazz funk, and metal.

Since the release of the game, Square Enix has published the 2011 four-disc soundtrack album, Final Fantasy XIII-2 Original Soundtrack, as well as an album of arrangements and alternate versions of tracks from the game, Final Fantasy XIII Original Soundtrack PLUS, in 2012. The theme song for the game, "Yakusoku no Basho" (約束の場所, The Promised Place), was released by singer Mai Fukui as a single in 2011, and the English version of the song, sung by Charice Pempengco and included in the non-Japanese versions of the game, was included on her 2012 album Infinity. Reviews of the soundtrack album were positive, with critics praising both the variety of styles and quality of the pieces. Several critics noted Mizuta's work as possibly his finest to date. Reviewers were mixed in their opinions of the arranged album, feeling that several of the pieces were simply inferior versions of the original tracks. Both of the albums and the single sold well enough to place on the Japanese Oricon charts, with the original soundtrack album reaching a peak of #13 and remaining on the charts for eight weeks.

== Downloadable content ==
The game features downloadable content (DLC) in the form of downloadable outfits, weapons, accessories, scenarios, recruitable monsters and minigames. Although there had been initial plans to release DLC for Final Fantasy XIII, these ideas did not come to fruition. For Final Fantasy XIII-2, the team designed and planned for content, including DLC, that would expand on the game since the beginning of its development. Players who own XIII save data can unlock an additional wallpaper (PS3) or gamer picture (Xbox 360) for the save file. DLC released after the game contained additional weapons, costumes, and monsters. Post-release downloads also included "Final Fantasy XIII Lost Report", which offers a look back at XIII's story through the perspective of non-playable characters from the game, and three downloadable scenarios for other characters: "Perpetual Battlefield", which reveals Snow's fate; "Heads or Tails", which shows how Sazh came to 500 AF Academia; and "Requiem of the Goddess", which shows Lightning's struggle against Caius and explains how she became crystallized in the main story's ending.

== Reception ==
=== Sales ===
During its first week of release in Japan, Final Fantasy XIII-2 sold 524,000 copies, and the PlayStation 3 version was the highest-selling game for the system. The Xbox 360 version only reached 48th. Although high, initial sales were notably lower than what they were for the game's predecessor, which sold 1.5 million units in its first week. By the end of the year, the game had sold over 697,000 units, and was the fifth-best selling game of 2011 in Japan. It was just below four handheld video games, making it the highest-selling home console game in Japan that year. In the United States, the game placed as the second-best selling game of February 2012, just below Call of Duty: Modern Warfare 3. In the United Kingdom, Final Fantasy XIII-2 was the best-selling game of February 2012. By January 2013, XIII-2 had sold 3.1 million copies worldwide. Approximately 400,000 further copies were registered on Steam by 2017, according to Steam Spy.

=== Reviews ===
Reception

Aggregate score
Aggregator	Score
Metacritic	X360: 79/100 (50 reviews); PS3: 79/100 (53 reviews); PC: 75/100 (6 reviews)

Review scores
Publication	Score
1Up.com	B
Destructoid	8.0/10
Edge	5/10
Eurogamer	8/10
Famitsu	40/40
Game Informer	8/10
GameSpot	7.5/10
GamesRadar+	4.5/5
IGN	8/10

Final Fantasy XIII-2 received very favorable reviews from Japanese reviewers, getting perfect scores from the Japanese magazines Famitsu and Dengeki PlayStation. Famitsu editor Ranbu Yoshida said that "it feels like a very different game from its predecessor" and that "it's easy to lose yourself in changing and redoing areas you've previously finished". Assistant editor Norihiro Fujiwara added that "the setting and presentation is fantastic, and the issues people brought up with the first game—its linearity, its lack of meaty gameplay—are a thing of the past. You're sucked into the game right from the beginning, and the story's very easy to get into". The game won the "Future Division" award at the 2011 Japan Game Awards and later won an "Award of Excellence" at the 2012 Japan Game Awards.

Outside Japan, the game received mostly positive reviews, which primarily focused on the changes in the game from its predecessor. Reviewers generally praised the graphics. The Edge review described the environments as "entirely captivating" and said that the "visual and audio design is marvellous", and Kevin VanOrd of GameSpot praised the graphics as beautiful and visually diverse. Jeremy Parish of 1UP.com disagreed, however, saying that the art "represents a step back from the splendor of Final Fantasy XIII". The music received mixed reviews; Parish said that the music was great, applauding the unique styles, but Simon Parkin of Eurogamer felt that the music "suffers from a lack of coherent direction", and tracks often failed to match their scenes. Dale North of Destructoid felt that the soundtrack was "wonderfully varied and lots of fun" and predicted that "traditionalist" fans of Final Fantasy music would not like it as much because of the varied new styles.

The gameplay was generally praised as well, with many reviewers noting the improvements in areas they saw as problems in the previous game. Parkin praised the game's "smart, engaging mechanics" and the "novel structure" of the gameplay. Joe Juba of Game Informer said that the changes to Final Fantasy XIII's battle system made it his favorite Final Fantasy battle system, and that the gameplay was "phenomenal". Ryan Clements of IGN felt that the gameplay was an improvement over XIII's, fixing many of its problems. Parish said that XIII-2 was an inversion of XIII in that the gameplay took precedence over the story. He described the battle system as "a joy" and said that the game was "never not fun". VanOrd agreed that the combat was fun, though he found it to be too easy. The Edge review, which was harsher on the game than most others, also found it to be too easy, which combined with what they saw as poor subquests and a lack of effort put in some regions made the gameplay uninteresting.

The story of the game received poor to mixed reviews. Parish felt that it was confusing and inessential to the game, while Juba said that it was "a disaster" which "screws up at almost every turn", overshadowing the game's good points. Parkin felt that the characters were weak and the story was not engaging, and Clements said that the story was insubstantial, which he found particularly disappointing as most Final Fantasy games focused heavily on their story. VanOrd was less negative towards the characters and story than most others, but still described the characters as good, but not great. He felt the game focused too much on the less interesting characters of Noel and Serah over Lightning and Caius, and said that the story was "semi-coherent" and missed several emotional notes, particularly in the first half of the game.

== Sequel ==
Hints and rumors began circulating about a sequel to Final Fantasy XIII-2 as early as December 2011, when Square Enix registered the Final Fantasy XIII-3 web domain. At the time, the company stated that it was simply a precaution and did not mean there was such a game. After the game was released with a "To be continued" ending, Square Enix said that the ending was chosen to prompt players to explore the alternative endings and remain ready for the coming DLC levels. However, after the release of what was stated to be the final piece of DLC, officials at Square Enix announced that they would be releasing future Final Fantasy XIII-related content. In late August 2012, a teaser site was unveiled in preparation for the Final Fantasy 25th Anniversary Event, titled "A Storm Gathers", promising a "new direction for the saga of key character Lightning". A sequel, Lightning Returns: Final Fantasy XIII, serves as the ending to the story of the main Final Fantasy XIII character, Lightning. It was released in 2013 in Japan and 2014 in the West.
