= Daisuke Watanabe =

Japanese video game writer (born 1974)

- Born: March 11, 1974 (age 52); Yokohama, Kanagawa Prefecture, Japan
- Occupation: video game writer

Daisuke Watanabe (渡辺 大祐, Watanabe Daisuke) is a Japanese video game writer employed by Square Enix. He is mostly known for his work on the role-playing video game series Final Fantasy and the action RPG series Kingdom Hearts.

== Career ==
Watanabe first became interested in writing in junior high school in 1988, after reading the Wizardry novel Tonariawase no Hai to Seishun by Benny Matsuyama. Before he joined Square, Watanabe wrote manga novelizations. Final Fantasy X was the first Final Fantasy game that he worked on as scenario writer. Among others, he was responsible for the dialog in the Zanarkand Ruins which he almost wrote in one single night. He joined the Final Fantasy XIII team in early 2004 but left it again about half a year later. He instead became part of the Final Fantasy XII development team in November 2004. The original scenario writer Yasumi Matsuno left that project in August 2005 due to sickness. Hiroshi Minagawa, the co-director of Final Fantasy XII, expressed his regrets that many of the story ideas by Watanabe had to be dropped so the game could meet the deadline for the release. (Note: Hiroshi Minagawa: In the course of development, Jun Akiyama and Daisuke Watanabe came up with many ideas but ultimately we had to abandon many of them. I'd heard their original ideas and I wish we could have included them all. Once we began development and many of the systems were in place, the team had many progressive ideas. It was the most enjoyable part of the project. But as we approached the project's end, I had to point out features we had to drop in order for the game to be finished. Which is unfortunate, since I'm sure people would have enjoyed the game that much more if we could have left all our original ideas in.) In March 2006, Watanabe rejoined the Final Fantasy XIII team after Kazushige Nojima and Motomu Toriyama had conceived a mythology and story for the game, respectively. He was shown a rough outline of the plot until chapter eight and was asked by Toriyama to flesh things out and to correct how it would all connect. Watanabe decided how Toriyama's rudimentary cutscene ideas should play out, wrote the script and adjusted the personality of each character to emphasize what the story tried to express. He said that the Final Fantasy XIII series was an exhausting project with little time to breathe and that his feelings toward it were "complicated". Watanabe not only wrote the scripts for the games but also a three-part novella titled Final Fantasy XIII Reminiscence: tracer of memories that was published in the Japanese game magazine Famitsu.

== Works ==
Game	Released	System(s)	Credit(s)
Threads of Fate	1999	PlayStation	Scenario writer
Final Fantasy X	2001	PlayStation 2	Scenario planner, scenario writer
Kingdom Hearts	2002	PlayStation 2	Scenario writer
Final Fantasy X-2	2003	PlayStation 2	Scenario writer
Kingdom Hearts: Chain of Memories	2004	Game Boy Advance	Scenario writer
Kingdom Hearts II	2005	PlayStation 2	Scenario text planner
Final Fantasy XII	2006	PlayStation 2	Scenario writer
Kingdom Hearts Re:Chain of Memories	2007	PlayStation 2	Scenario
Final Fantasy XII: Revenant Wings	2007	Nintendo DS	Special thanks
Dissidia: Final Fantasy	2008	PlayStation Portable	Scenario writer
Kingdom Hearts 358/2 Days	2009	Nintendo DS	Scenario supervisor
Final Fantasy XIII	2009	PlayStation 3, Xbox 360	Lead scenario writer
Kingdom Hearts Birth by Sleep	2010	PlayStation Portable	Scenario plot
Kingdom Hearts coded	2009–2010	Mobile phone	Scenario writer
Kingdom Hearts Re:coded	2010	Nintendo DS	Scenario supervisor
Front Mission Evolved	2010	PlayStation 3, Xbox 360, Windows	Scriptwriter
Final Fantasy XIII-2	2011	PlayStation 3, Xbox 360	Lead scenario writer
Lightning Returns: Final Fantasy XIII	2013	PlayStation 3, Xbox 360	Lead scenario writer
Mobius Final Fantasy	2015-2020	iOS, Android, Microsoft Windows	Lead scenario writer
Final Fantasy XII: The Zodiac Age	2017	PlayStation 4	Scenario advisor
Itadaki Street: Dragon Quest and Final Fantasy 30th Anniversary	2017	PlayStation 4, PlayStation Vita	Scenario supervisor
Final Fantasy Resonance	2026	PS5, Series X/S, Switch, Switch 2, Windows	Scenario writer
