= Music of Final Fantasy XIII-2 =

Music from the video game Final Fantasy XIII-2

Final Fantasy XIII-2 is a role-playing video game developed and published by Square Enix in 2011 as the sequel to Final Fantasy XIII. The music of the game was composed by Masashi Hamauzu, Naoshi Mizuta, and Mitsuto Suzuki. It was intended to sound different from the music of previous Final Fantasy titles, featuring more musical styles and vocal pieces. Since the release of the game, Square Enix has published the 2011 four-disc soundtrack album, Final Fantasy XIII-2 Original Soundtrack, as well as an album of arrangements and alternate versions of tracks from the game, Final Fantasy XIII Original Soundtrack PLUS, in 2012. The theme song for the game, "Yakusoku no Basho" (約束の場所, The Promised Place), was released by singer Mai Fukui as a single in 2011, and the English version of the song, sung by Charice Pempengco and included in the non-Japanese versions of the game, was included on her 2012 album Infinity.

Reviews of the soundtrack album were positive, with critics praising both the variety of styles and quality of the pieces. Several critics noted Mizuta's work as possibly his finest to date. Reviewers of the game were more mixed, with some feeling that some of the styles of music did not match where they were played in the game. Critics were also mixed in their opinions of the arranged album, feeling that several of the pieces were simply inferior versions of the original tracks. Both of the albums and the single sold well enough to place on the Japanese Oricon charts, with the original soundtrack album reaching a peak of #13 and remaining on the charts for eight weeks.

== Creation and influence ==
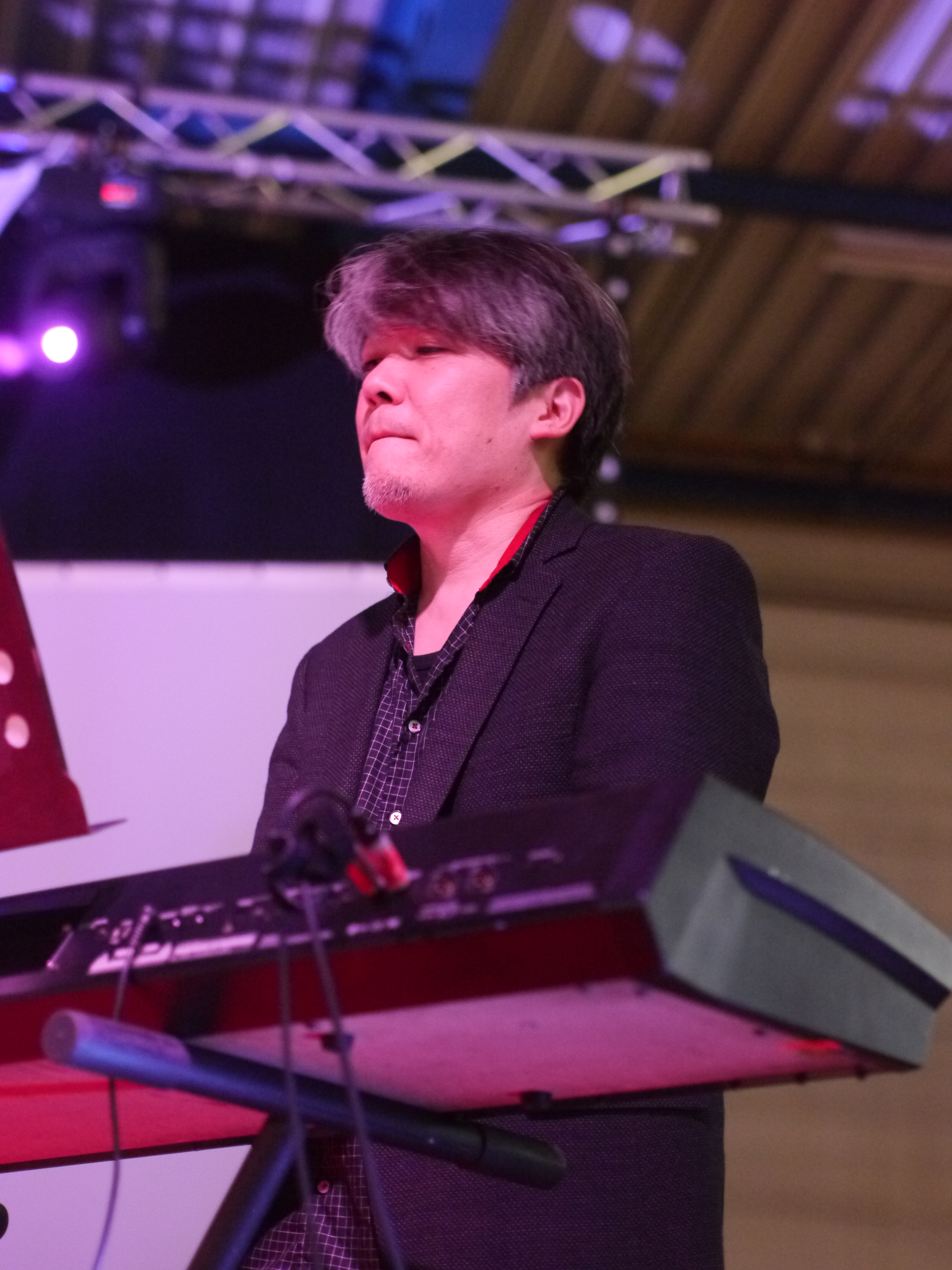
Composer Masashi Hamauzu in 2012.

The music of Final Fantasy XIII-2 was composed by Masashi Hamauzu, Naoshi Mizuta, and Mitsuto Suzuki. The three composers were coordinated by Keiji Kawamori to ensure the composers' three styles meshed well together. Hamauzu, who was the sole composer for the music of Final Fantasy XIII, composed roughly a quarter of the game's tracks, as did Suzuki, while Mizuta wrote nearly half. Prior to this game, Mizuta has worked on the music of Final Fantasy XI, while Suzuki had been a sound director for several Square Enix games and served as an arranger for XIII. The game's director, Motomu Toriyama, wanted the game's soundtrack to have more variety than that of the music in XIII, as well as feature more styles. As a result, the game had three composers rather than just Hamauzu. Toriyama also wished for the music to have "a more edgy sound" and more vocal pieces, so that it would sound "unlike the typical Final Fantasy title". The music incorporates a wide variety of styles, from orchestral and electronic to rap, hip-hop, jazz funk, and metal.

Prior to the game Hamauzu was known for working on orchestral pieces, Mizuta for instrumental pieces, and Suzuki for electronic pieces, and as a result all three composers attempted to write music that did not fit their general style to avoid only writing music similar to what they had produced before. They also worked with each other to blend their styles together, so that shifts between composers in the soundtrack would not be jarring. While the music is not intended to be reminiscent of Final Fantasy XIII's music, pieces set in scenes involving places or characters from the predecessor use motifs and pieces of music used in that game for those places or characters. Mizuta's favorite song from the soundtrack that he wrote is "Caius's Theme", which he rewrote four times over the course of a month. Suzuki's favorite is "Historia Crux", which he wrote as several tunes mixing into one as a metaphor for time travel in the game, and Hamauzu's is "Knight of the Goddess", the battle theme for the game, which he attempted to make the equal of "Blinded by Light", the battle theme of the predecessor, which he felt was very well received.

== Soundtrack ==
Final Fantasy XIII-2 Original Soundtrack

Soundtrack album by Masashi Hamauzu, Naoshi Mizuta, and Mitsuto Suzuki
- Released: December 14, 2011
- Genre: Video game soundtrack
- Length: Disc 1: 1:10:35; Disc 2: 1:18:09; Disc 3: 1:14:46; Disc 4: 1:17:52; Total: 5:01:22
- Label: Square Enix

The first album of music from the game which Square Enix released is Final Fantasy XIII-2 Original Soundtrack. The album contains all of the musical tracks from the game, and was composed and produced by Masashi Hamauzu, Naoshi Mizuta, and Mitsuto Suzuki. Some of the tracks were arranged by Ryo Yamazaki, Yoshitaka Suzuki, Kengo Tokusashi, Shootie HG, and Sachiko Miyano, and a few songs were arrangements of previous Final Fantasy composer Nobuo Uematsu's chocobo theme. Multiple artists made lyrical contributions, including Shootie HG, Origa, and Aimee Blackschleger. The soundtrack spans four discs and 79 tracks, covering a duration of 5:01:22. It was released by Square Enix on December 14, 2011 in Japan and on February 2, 2012 in North America as a part of the limited edition of the game, bearing the catalog numbers SQEX-10296~9. The Japanese limited edition of the soundtrack included a bonus DVD disc containing two versions of the 2011 Electronic Entertainment Expo trailer for the game. The album reached #13 on the Japanese Oricon charts, and remained on the charts for eight weeks.

The album received positive reviews from critics. Patrick Gann of the role-playing video game news website RPGFan called it "a no-questions-asked kind of purchase", praising in particular the variety of the pieces and the contrasts between the different styles. Jayson Napolitano of the video game music news website Original Sound Version concurred, calling it "a fantastic soundtrack" with eclectic styles, and noting Mizuta's contributions as his best work to date. Original Sound Version later named the album as the best soundtrack of 2011. Don Kotowski of Square Enix Music Online, another video game music news website, was not as enthusiastic about the album as other reviewers, as he felt that some of the more experimental tracks missed the mark, but was still positive about the album as a whole. He considered the soundtrack "a fresh sound for the series", and agreed with Napolitano that Mizuta's contributions were noteworthy for the composer. Reviewers of the soundtrack in the context of the game were more mixed. Simon Parkin in his review of the game for Eurogamer said that the music "suffers from a lack of coherent direction" and often did not match up with the scenes it was played in. Dale North of Destructoid, however, felt that the soundtrack was "wonderfully varied and lots of fun", and predicted that "traditionalist" fans of Final Fantasy music would not like it as much.

Track list

Disc 1
No.	Title	Writer(s)	Japanese title	Length
1.	"FINAL FANTASY XIII-2 Overture"	Masashi Hamauzu	"FINAL FANTASY XIII-2 オーバーチュア"	2:12
2.	"Warrior Goddess"	Masashi Hamauzu	"麗しき軍神"	2:56
3.	"FINAL FANTASY XIII-2 - Wishes -"	Masashi Hamauzu	"FINAL FANTASY XIII-2 ～願い～"	1:57
4.	"Etro's Champion"	Masashi Hamauzu	"女神の騎士"	2:16
5.	"Eternal War"	Masashi Hamauzu	"永劫の闘争"	3:52
6.	"Divine Conflict"	Masashi Hamauzu	"戦神"	3:22
7.	"An Arrow Through Time"	Masashi Hamauzu	"時を超える矢"	2:42
8.	"Paradox"	Naoshi Mizuta	"パラドクス"	4:05
9.	"Giant's Fist"	Naoshi Mizuta	"ジャイアントインパクト"	3:02
10.	"A World Without Cocoon"	Masashi Hamauzu	"コクーンのない世界"	3:40
11.	"Full Speed Ahead"	Naoshi Mizuta	"疾走"	3:55
12.	"Noel's Theme"	Naoshi Mizuta	"ノエルのテーマ"	4:21
13.	"New Bodhum"	Mitsuto Suzuki	"ネオ・ボーダム"	5:39
14.	"New Bodhum - Aggressive Mix -"	Mitsuto Suzuki	"ネオ・ボーダム -Aggressive Mix-"	5:45
15.	"Paradigm Shift"	Naoshi Mizuta	"パラダイムシフト"	3:50
16.	"Glory's Fanfare"	Mitsuto Suzuki	"名誉のファンファーレ"	1:54
17.	"Groovy Chocobo"	Nobuo Uematsu	"グルービーチョコボ"	4:29
18.	"FINAL FANTASY XIII-2 - The Future -"	Masashi Hamauzu	"FINAL FANTASY XIII-2 ～未来～"	2:47
19.	"Historia Crux"	Mitsuto Suzuki	"ヒストリアクロス"	4:28
20.	"Worlds Collide"	Naoshi Mizuta	"衝突する世界"	3:23

Disc 2
No.	Title	Writer(s)	Japanese title	Length
1.	"Unseen Intruder"	Naoshi Mizuta	"不可視の侵略者"	7:02
2.	"Unseen Intruder - Aggressive Mix -"	Naoshi Mizuta	"不可視の侵略者 -Aggressive Mix-"	6:39
3.	"The Last Hunter"	Naoshi Mizuta	"ラストハンター"	5:39
4.	"Blessed Fanfare"	Mitsuto Suzuki	"祝福のファンファーレ"	2:03
5.	"The Story So Far…"	Naoshi Mizuta	"戦いの軌跡"	2:04
6.	"Missing Link"	Mitsuto Suzuki	"ミッシングリンク"	4:05
7.	"Memories for the Future"	Naoshi Mizuta	"未来への追憶"	3:30
8.	"Eclipse"	Mitsuto Suzuki	"エクリプス"	3:36
9.	"Eclipse - Aggressive Mix -"	Mitsuto Suzuki	"エクリプス -Aggressive Mix-"	4:28
10.	"Hope's Theme - Tomorrow's Dream -"	Masashi Hamauzu	"ホープのテーマ ～託す想い～"	2:33
11.	"Song of the Farseers"	Naoshi Mizuta	"時詠みの歌"	6:46
12.	"Village and Void"	Naoshi Mizuta	"壊れた郷"	5:32
13.	"Village and Void - Aggressive Mix -"	Naoshi Mizuta	"壊れた郷 -Aggressive Mix-"	5:29
14.	"Temporal Rift"	Mitsuto Suzuki	"時の迷宮"	3:22
15.	"Oracle Drive"	Naoshi Mizuta	"予言の書"	3:09
16.	"Caius's Theme"	Naoshi Mizuta	"カイアスのテーマ"	3:14
17.	"Eyes of Etro"	Naoshi Mizuta	"エトロの瞳"	2:16
18.	"Parallel Worlds"	Mitsuto Suzuki	"並行世界"	3:26
19.	"Parallel Worlds - Aggressive Mix -"	Mitsuto Suzuki	"並行世界 -Aggressive Mix-"	3:16

Disc 3
No.	Title	Writer(s)	Japanese title	Length
1.	"The Void Beyond"	Mitsuto Suzuki	"時空の狭間"	4:02
2.	"Oathbrand"	Naoshi Mizuta	"誓いの烙印"	1:56
3.	"Limit Break!"	Mitsuto Suzuki	"限界突破！"	6:33
4.	"Starting Over"	Naoshi Mizuta	"スターティングオーバー"	5:21
5.	"Starting Over - Aggressive Mix -"	Naoshi Mizuta	"スターティングオーバー -Aggressive Mix-"	5:21
6.	"Mischievous Mog's Marvelous Plan with Flan"	Naoshi Mizuta	"プリンをもってプリンを制す"	2:05
7.	"Plains of Eternity"	Naoshi Mizuta	"悠久の大平原"	3:36
8.	"Plains of Eternity - Aggressive Mix -"	Naoshi Mizuta	"悠久の大平原 -Aggressive Mix-"	3:31
9.	"Serendipity"	Naoshi Mizuta	"逸楽の宮殿ザナドゥ"	4:40
10.	"Chocobo Rodeo"	Nobuo Uematsu	"ロデオdeチョコボ"	2:02
11.	"All or Nothing"	Naoshi Mizuta	"のるかそるか"	5:39
12.	"Threat Level Omega"	Naoshi Mizuta	"コンディションオメガ"	2:18
13.	"Chaotic Guardian"	Naoshi Mizuta	"混沌の誓約者"	5:41
14.	"Yeul's Theme"	Naoshi Mizuta	"ユールのテーマ"	6:45
15.	"Feral Link"	Naoshi Mizuta	"シンクロドライブ"	2:40
16.	"Augusta Tower"	Mitsuto Suzuki	"アガスティアタワー"	2:40
17.	"Augusta Tower - Aggressive Mix -"	Mitsuto Suzuki	"アガスティアタワー -Aggressive Mix-"	2:51
18.	"Academia"	Masashi Hamauzu	"新都アカデミア"	3:38
19.	"Academia Theme"	Masashi Hamauzu	"アカデミーのテーマ"	3:27

Disc 4
No.	Title	Writer(s)	Japanese title	Length
1.	"A Fading Miracle"	Masashi Hamauzu	"壊れゆく奇跡"	2:45
2.	"Crazy Chocobo"	Nobuo Uematsu	"クレイジーチョコボ"	1:56
3.	"Shadow of Valhalla"	Mitsuto Suzuki	"ヴァルハラの影"	4:46
4.	"Countless Partings"	Naoshi Mizuta	"数え切れない別れ"	3:48
5.	"Hollow Seclusion - Game Over -"	Mitsuto Suzuki	"うつろなる幽境 ～ゲームオーバー～"	2:24
6.	"Serah's Theme - Memories -"	Masashi Hamauzu	"セラのテーマ ～記憶～"	2:48
7.	"Noel's Theme - Final Journey -"	Naoshi Mizuta	"ノエルのテーマ ～最後の旅～"	4:21
8.	"Lightning's Theme - Unprotected Future -"	Masashi Hamauzu	"ライトニングのテーマ ～守れなかった未来～"	3:48
9.	"Etro's Gate"	Masashi Hamauzu	"エトロの門"	2:12
10.	"Tears of the Goddess"	Masashi Hamauzu	"女神の涙"	2:07
11.	"Labyrinth of Chaos"	Naoshi Mizuta	"混沌のラビリンス"	5:03
12.	"Time's Master"	Masashi Hamauzu	"時空の覇者"	4:21
13.	"Heart of Chaos"	Naoshi Mizuta	"混沌の心臓"	3:00
14.	"Promise to the Future"	Naoshi Mizuta	"未来への約束"	3:55
15.	"Unseen Abyss"	Naoshi Mizuta and Mitsuto Suzuki	"不可視の深淵"	4:45
16.	"Eternal Paradox"	Naoshi Mizuta	"永遠のパラドクス"	5:56
17.	"World of Hope"	Masashi Hamauzu	"希望の地へ"	1:56
18.	"Metashield Deployed"	Masashi Hamauzu	"メタシールド展開"	1:16
19.	"The Goddess is Dead"	Masashi Hamauzu	"女神なき世界"	1:55
20.	"Closing Credits"	Masashi Hamauzu and Naoshi Mizuta	"エンディングロール"	9:52
21.	"[Secret Track]"	Mitsuto Suzuki	"Track 21"	4:58

== Soundtrack Plus ==
Final Fantasy XIII-2 Original Soundtrack PLUS

Soundtrack album by Masashi Hamauzu, Naoshi Mizuta, and Mitsuto Suzuki
- Released: May 30, 2012
- Genre: Video game soundtrack
- Length: 1:07:02
- Label: Square Enix

On May 30, 2012 Square Enix published in Japan a second album of music from the game titled Final Fantasy XIII-2 Original Soundtrack PLUS. Similar to the Final Fantasy XIII Original Soundtrack PLUS album released for the previous game, the album contains early versions of songs used in Final Fantasy XIII-2, alternate takes contained in the downloadable content for the game, arrangements made for promotions of the game, and new remixes. The tracks on the album were arranged by Ryo Yamazaki, Kengo Tokusashi, Yoshitaka Suzuki, Goh Hotoda, Shootie HG, and Hiroyuki Togo. The single-disc soundtrack contains 16 tracks, covering a duration of 1:07:02, and bears the catalog number SQEX-10311. The album's music covers a variety of styles, often different ones than those of the original pieces, including electronic, instrumental, and piano covers. The album reached #93 on the Oricon charts, and remained on the charts for one week.

Unlike the original soundtrack, the arranged album received mixed reviews from critics. Patrick Gann of RPGFan felt that the album was a good addition to the musical outputs of the Final Fantasy XIII world, and superior to the PLUS soundtrack for the first game in that it relied less on early, unpolished versions of songs. Don Kotowski of Square Enix Music Online, however, felt that the album contained mainly "inferior" versions of works from the original soundtrack, and was not worth acquiring. Both reviewers praised "Clash on the Big Bridge - Oriental Mix -", an arrangement of a tune by Nobuo Uematsu from Final Fantasy V included in the game's downloadable content, as a welcome addition to the soundtrack, with Kotowski calling it "amazing" and the main reason to get the album, and Gann terming it "the most interesting version" of the song released to date.

Track list
No.	Title	Writer(s)	Japanese title	Length
1.	"Local Cosmos_soft_4Beat"	Mitsuto Suzuki	"Local Cosmos_soft_4Beat"	4:11
2.	"Travelogue_GuideVocalDemo"	Mitsuto Suzuki	"Travelogue_GuideVocalDemo"	5:07
3.	"The Last Hunter_original long edition"	Naoshi Mizuta	"The Last Hunter_original long edition"	4:01
4.	"Unseen Intruder_instrumental"	Naoshi Mizuta	"Unseen Intruder_instrumental"	6:37
5.	"Memories for the Future_another take"	Naoshi Mizuta	"Memories for the Future_another take"	3:28
6.	"FirstPV"	Masashi Hamauzu	"FirstPV"	0:36
7.	"Starting Over_Goh Hotoda REMIX"	Naoshi Mizuta	"Starting Over_Goh Hotoda REMIX"	7:11
8.	"BOSSBATTLE_v2-09_31aug11"	Mitsuto Suzuki	"BOSSBATTLE_v2-09_31aug11"	3:17
9.	"Crazy Chocobo_UstreamEdit"	Nobuo Uematsu	"クレイジーチョコボ_UstreamEdit"	1:43
10.	"Hopping Chocobo"	Nobuo Uematsu	"Hopping Chocobo"	4:38
11.	"Noel's Theme_guitar demo version"	Naoshi Mizuta	"Noel's Theme_guitar demo version"	5:17
12.	"Local Cosmos_other_110725"	Mitsuto Suzuki	"Local Cosmos_other_110725"	3:38
13.	"Parallel World CrossFadeDemo"	Mitsuto Suzuki	"並行世界 CrossFadeDemo"	1:54
14.	"yuza_050"	Masashi Hamauzu	"yuza_050"	0:41
15.	"Clash on the Big Bridge - Oriental MIX -"	Nobuo Uematsu	"ビッグブリッジの死闘 - Oriental MIX -"	7:12
16.	"Noel's Theme - Final Journey -_AbstractSetOne"	Naoshi Mizuta	"Noel's Theme - Final Journey -_AbstractSetOne"	7:31

== Theme song ==
"Yakusoku no Basho" (約束の場所, The Promised Place) is the theme song of the Japanese version of Final Fantasy XIII-2. Sung by Mai Fukui, it was composed by Koichi Tabo. Non-Japanese versions of the game instead included an alternate English version of the song, "New World", from Charice Pempengco's album Infinity (2012). "New World" was also composed by Koichi Tabo. "Yakusoku no Basho" was released as a single on November 23, 2011 by J-more, and included three other tracks in addition to the piece. These tracks are "Tatta Hitori no Mikata" (たったひとりの味方, Only One Side) and instrumental version of both songs. Simon Isogai composed and wrote the lyrics for "Tatta Hitori no Mikata". The limited edition of the single included a DVD with a music video for the song. The song was also released on Fukui's six-track mini-album Beautiful Days on December 14 the same year, along with a Final Fantasy XIII-2 trailer and a code for downloadable content for the game. The single has a length of 21:22, and has the catalog number of YICD-70093. The single reached #24 on the Oricon charts, and stayed on the charts for 8 weeks.

Track list
No.	Title	Writer(s)	Japanese title	Length
1.	"Yakusoku no Basho"	Koichi Tabo	"約束の場所"	6:10
2.	"Tatta Hitori no Mikata"	Simon Isogai	"たったひとりの味方"	4:31
3.	"Yakusoku no Basho (Instrumental)"	Koichi Tabo	"約束の場所 (Instrumental)"	6:10
4.	"Tatta Hitori no Mikata (Instrumental)"	Simon Isogai	"たったひとりの味方 (Instrumental)"	4:31
