= Mitsuto Suzuki =

Japanese composer (born 1973)

- Born: April 6, 1973 (age 53); Kyoto Prefecture, Japan
- Occupations: Composer, arranger, musician
- Years active: 1993–present
- Employers: Tose (c. 1993–1996); Square Enix (2006–present)
- Musical career
- Genres: Video game music; electronic; IDM; techno; synthpop; orchestral

Mitsuto Suzuki (鈴木 光人, Suzuki Mitsuto; born April 6, 1973) is a Japanese video game composer and musician who has been employed at Square Enix since 2006. He is best known for his work on the Final Fantasy franchise, most notably Final Fantasy XIII-2, Final Fantasy VII Remake, and Final Fantasy VII Rebirth. He has also composed for games such as the Beatmania series, The 3rd Birthday, and Schoolgirl Strikers.

== Early life ==
Suzuki's interest in music started in the early 1980s, after his older brother bought a synthesizer, which he got to play with. He also studied the Electone at Yamaha Music School. In his first year of junior high school, he bought a digital synthesizer for himself, which led to him making music using rhythm machines and synthesizers in his spare time. He also utilized multitrack recording to make 60 minute tapes of video game music. At high school, he was the keyboardist of a Beatles cover band. After graduating from high school, Suzuki went to a vocational school, where he studied sound engineering.

== Tose and early music career (1993–2006) ==
Suzuki dropped out of the vocational school and joined the game company Tose, where he composed for games such as Mobile Suit V Gundam and Ultraman Powered. While employed there, he made his professional music debut as part of the duo ARP-2600, releasing a techno EP titled Voices of Planet on the label Torema Records in 1994. After leaving Tose, he worked at more music companies, and also continued to pursue his music career by working on various projects. Under the name Electric Satie, he created the album Gymnopedie '99, featuring electronic covers of compositions by Erik Satie. This concept was suggested by his long-time friend Yosuke Kakegawa.

In 2000, Suzuki founded the synthpop group Overrocket along with Takashi Watanabe and Michiyo Honda. They released multiple albums inspired by both 1980s and contemporary synthpop. Suzuki eventually left the group, leaving Watanabe to take over as the group's director and main songwriter.

== Square Enix (2006–present) ==
Suzuki joined Square Enix in 2006 as a synthesizer operator, with his first title being Project Sylpheed: Arc of Deception. He assisted lead composer Kenichiro Fukui with programming and creating rhythms for his tracks in the game. He was also given freedom to release electronic albums through Square Enix, including In My Own Backyard in 2007 and Neurovision in 2009, exclusively released on iTunes Store. These were created at home using software synths and further polished using equipment at Square Enix's offices. They have been described as "dreamy" and "catchy", and feature vocals by Suzuki himself, who felt it would be quicker to provide his own vocals than "micro-manage" another singer. Although they were intended to be part of a trilogy, a third album has not materialized.

In 2008, he collaborated with Masashi Hamauzu on the soundtrack for Sigma Harmonics, with his roles being mixing and co-arrangement. This proved to be challenging for both Hamauzu and Suzuki; due to the game's limited ROM size, the music had to be compressed to 16 kHz and Suzuki had to shorten some tracks to fit within the ROM. The following year, he also arranged a handful of tracks for Hamauzu's score to Final Fantasy XIII. Hamauzu gave him creative freedom to add and replace elements as he pleased, although Suzuki has since stated he feels embarrassed about the decisions he made to them.

His first major score at Square Enix was The 3rd Birthday in 2010, where he served as the lead composer, alongside composers Yoko Shimomura and Tsuyoshi Sekito. Shimomura was unable to compose the whole soundtrack, but contacted Suzuki after being impressed with his solo work. Suzuki also invited Sekito to join the project towards the end of the development of The Last Remnant, having high respect for his musical experience and knowledge. Although he was happy that he was now able to compose scores at Square Enix, he feels there was not a large difference in his production style whether his role was writing, arranging, or synthesizer operating. He also composed the music for Final Fantasy XIII-2 along with Hamauzu and Naoshi Mizuta. Under the direction of Motomu Toriyama, the composers were asked to create music that greatly differed from previous Final Fantasy titles; the resulting soundtrack features a large variety of musical styles. Suzuki returned with Hamauzu and Mizuta to compose the music for Lightning Returns: Final Fantasy XIII in 2013. He collaborated with several arrangers and performers, including the band Language, consisting of long-time friends Kakegawa and Naoyuki Honzawa, and vocalist Kaori.

In 2015, he served as the composer for Mobius Final Fantasy, composing all music for the initial release of the game. He felt that being the game's sole composer allowed him to have greater control over the resulting soundtrack, but also enlisted arrangers and performers to expand the variety of music. Numerous tracks were regularly added to the game following its release. He also served as one of the composers for Final Fantasy VII Remake in 2020, which includes arrangements of music from the original Final Fantasy VII as well as new tracks composed by himself and Hamauzu. He aimed to create music that would convey a sense of nostalgia and playfuless, while also feeling fresh, and avoided creating music that he felt was "cheesy". Similar to his work on the Final Fantasy XIII series, he made extensive use of synthesizers, incorporating influences from 1980s to 2000s electronic music. He stated that the themes for Wall Market, Honeybee Inn, and Midgar Highway were among his favorite contributions to the soundtrack. He returned to compose music for Final Fantasy VII Rebirth in 2024.

In addition to his ongoing work at Square Enix, he formed the duo mojera in 2019, along with vocalist and guitarist non. Years prior to the formation of mojera, he was working on a third solo album but became too busy to continue it. After considering returning to work on the album, he discovered non's music and contacted her about collaborating. Suzuki aims for its music to be shoegaze, while combining heavy use of Suzuki's synths with non's guitar parts. The duo has also contributed tracks to albums by game music label Scarlet Moon, and performed live in 2024 for the first time.

== Personal life ==
Suzuki lives with his wife, who is a dress designer. They have a son, who also has an interest in music.

== Works ==
Year	Title	Notes
1993	Rokudenashi Blues	Music
1994	Mobile Suit V Gundam	Music with Akihito Suita
1994	Ultraman Powered	Cutscene music with Akihito Suita and Hideyuki Ashizawa
1995	Super Bombliss	Console version; music
1995	V Tennis	Music with Hiroshi Nakajima
1996	Namco Museum Vol. 2	Music with various others
1996	V Tennis 2	Music with Hiroshi Nakajima
2000	Keyboardmania	Console version; arrangement ("Gymnopedie (Skip Over MIX)")
2002	Beatmania 6thMix + Core Remix	Arrangement ("La Bossanova de Sana")
2003	Zone of the Enders: The 2nd Runner	Special Edition only; arrangement ("Beyond the Bounds (Mitsuto Suzuki 020203 Mix feat. Sana)")
2004	Beatmania IIDX 10th Style	Music ("Let's Run")
2005	Beatmania IIDX 12: Happy Sky	Music ("Listen Up")
2006	Project Sylpheed: Arc of Deception	Synthesizer operation with Kenichiro Fukui, Takahiro Nishi, and Junya Nakano
2007	Gravidis	Music with Ryo Yamazaki
2007	Final Fantasy Fables: Chocobo's Dungeon	Synthesizer operation
2008	The World Ends with You	International version; arrangement ("Déjà Vu")
2008	Sigma Harmonics	Arrangements with Masashi Hamauzu
2008	Toradora!	Anime; opening theme arrangement ("Pre-Parade")
2008	Cid to Chocobo no Fushigi na Dungeon: Toki Wasure no Meikyū DS+	Synthesizer operation
2008	Dissidia Final Fantasy	Arrangements with Takeharu Ishimoto and Tsuyoshi Sekito
2009	Final Fantasy: The 4 Heroes of Light	Synthesizer operation, arrangements with Naoshi Mizuta
2009	Final Fantasy XIII	Arrangements with various others
2010	The 3rd Birthday	Music with Yoko Shimomura and Tsuyoshi Sekito
2011	Dissidia 012 Final Fantasy	Arrangements with various others
2011	Lord of Vermilion II Re:2	Arrangement ("Chocobo & Moogle -LoV Edit-")
2011	Final Fantasy XIII-2	Music with Masashi Hamauzu and Naoshi Mizuta
2012	Demons' Score	Arrangements ("Berith Remix ver." and "Satan Remix ver.")
2012	Groove Coaster Zero	Music ("Freestyle Beats")
2013	Lightning Returns: Final Fantasy XIII	Music with Masashi Hamauzu and Naoshi Mizuta
2014	Schoolgirl Strikers	Music with Kengo Tokusashi
2014	Groove Coaster EX	Music ("Maiami Sound Beats")
2014	The Irregular at Magic High School: Lost Zero	Music with Naoshi Mizuta
2015	Mobius Final Fantasy	Music with various others
2017	Schoolgirl Strikers: Animation Channel	Anime; music with Kengo Tokusashi
2019	Dissidia Final Fantasy NT	DLC; arrangement ("Blinded By Light")
2020	Final Fantasy VII Remake	Music with various others
2024	Final Fantasy VII Rebirth	Music with various others
