= Stranger of Paradise: Final Fantasy Origin =

2022 video game

- North American box art
- Developer: Koei Tecmo (Team Ninja)
- Publisher: Square Enix
- Directors: Daisuke Inoue; Hiroya Usuda; Nobumichi Kumabe
- Producers: Jin Fujiwara; Fumihiko Yasuda; Tetsuya Nomura
- Artist: Tetsuya Nomura
- Writers: Kazushige Nojima; Tomoco Kanemaki
- Composers: Naoshi Mizuta; Hidenori Iwasaki; Ryo Yamazaki
- Series: Final Fantasy
- Platforms: PlayStation 4; PlayStation 5; Windows; Xbox One; Xbox Series X/S
- Release: March 18, 2022
- Genre: Action role-playing
- Modes: Single-player, multiplayer

Stranger of Paradise: Final Fantasy Origin (Note: Sutorenjā Obu Paradaisu: Fainaru Fantajī Orijin (Japanese: ストレンジャー オブ パラダイス ファイナルファンタジー オリジン)) is a 2022 action role-playing game developed by Koei Tecmo's Team Ninja and published by Square Enix. A celebration of the Final Fantasy series' 35th anniversary, Stranger of Paradise takes concepts from the original Final Fantasy on the NES and follows a set of characters brought into a fantasy world to face the malevolent Chaos. The game was released in March 2022 for PlayStation 4, PlayStation 5, Windows, Xbox One, and Xbox Series X/S.

== Gameplay ==
Stranger of Paradise: Final Fantasy Origin is an action role-playing game in which players take on the role of protagonist Jack, exploring environments and fighting monsters of the Final Fantasy series. Combat takes place in real-time, with Jack being able to switch between two assigned jobs and use physical and magical attacks. Once an enemy's "break gauge" is depleted, Jack can perform a finishing blow that crystallizes the enemy, allowing Jack to harvest them and restore a portion of his magic meter.

== Synopsis ==
=== Setting ===
Stranger of Paradise is set in a dark fantasy interpretation of the setting for the original Final Fantasy game. The main character is Jack, a man consumed by a need to destroy Chaos. Jack is accompanied by other companions, including newcomers Ash and Jed. During the journey they face a knight who has taken on the role of Chaos; while seemingly the foretold Warriors of Light, each has doubts as to whether that is their role.

=== Plot ===
Jack arrives in the kingdom of Cornelia, intent on destroying Chaos whose darkness has begun to plague the world, and is quickly joined by two other warriors, Ash and Jed, who have a similar mission. They petition the King of Cornelia to allow them to enter the Shrine of Chaos and destroy Chaos itself. While the King and his court are skeptical of Jack, Ash and Jed being the prophesied Warriors of Light due to the fact they are a party of three instead of four and possess only black crystals, the King allows them access to the Shrine of Chaos.

Jack and his party enter the Shrine of Chaos and seemingly defeat Chaos, only to reveal that the person they fought is a young girl named Neon, who similarly possesses a black crystal. She explains that she had also sought out to destroy Chaos ten years ago, but realized that Chaos is simply a myth created by humans to rationalize the existence of darkness. She had originally planned to absorb all the world's darkness to become the singular entity of Chaos that could be defeated by a band of heroes, but failed. Jack is skeptical of her story, and maintains that Chaos does exist and he will find it. Neon decides to accompany Jack's party as the fourth Warrior of Light. As they return to Cornelia, they muse about how all four of them have lost their memories, and Jack reasons it's to prevent them from making personal attachments that could interfere with their duty. The King then tasks the Warriors with restoring the Crystals of Wind, Fire, Earth, and Water to save the world.

To find the crystals, the Warriors meet with Astos, the King of the Dark Elves, who points them in the direction of the Wind Crystal. While searching for the Wind Crystal, the Warriors are transported to the Flying Fortress, a space station orbiting the planet. They defeat the Fiend of Chaos guarding the Wind Crystal, Tiamat, who reverts to another defeated hero named Sophia. The Wind Crystal is restored and Sophia decides to join the Warriors. As they journey to the Earth Crystal, the Warriors begin to recover fragments of their memories as they defeat monsters and absorb the darkness mist they expel into their crystals, and remember they all come from a faraway land beyond Cornelia. They subsequently find the Earth and Fire Crystals, defeating the respective Fiends Lich and Marilith. On the way to the Water Crystal, Neon admits to the Warriors that unlike them, she was born in Cornelia and now remembers that she was given her crystal by Astos. They then proceed to defeat the Fiend Kraken and restore the Water Crystal.

With the four Crystals restored, the Warriors return to Cornelia, only to find the darkness more prevalent than before. They are welcomed coldly and accused of being servants of Chaos just as monsters and darkness-infected pirates attack. After repelling the assault, the Warriors confront Astos, who reveals he is an observer left behind by the Lufenians, a highly advanced civilization capable of interdimensional travel, tasked with reporting the balance of light and darkness in Cornelia. Astos then attacks the Warriors, and upon his defeat, they begin to recover more of their memories, with Jack and his friends remembering that they are in fact "Strangers", otherworldly agents tasked with traveling to Cornelia to destroy the darkness that Lufenia disposed there. Jack and his friends have in fact been sent to Cornelia many times before, though their memories are temporarily erased on every deployment. However, if the Strangers fail to destroy the darkness, Lufenia simply resets the world. Disgusted by Lufenia's manipulation of Cornelia, Jack and his friends secretly plotted with Astos to find a way to break Lufenia's hold over Cornelia. Astos reveals that Lufenia fears the darkness because if it combines with human emotion, it creates chaos, which is the one force they cannot control. He also reveals that upon his death, the darkness he has stockpiled in his body will be released and cover the entire world, and this darkness quickly spreads to Cornelia.

Jack and his friends rush back to Cornelia, but are unable to save the townsfolk, including Princess Sarah, the daughter of the King of Cornelia. As Princess Sarah dies in his arms, Jack recovers more memories and remembers that he and Princess Sarah had fallen in love with each other. Seeing their chance, Ash, Jed, Neon, and Sophia attack Jack, forcing him to kill them in self defense and absorbing their collected darkness so he can become Chaos. He then forces open a portal back to Lufenia and absorbs the Darkness Manifest, a manifestation of chaos-imbued darkness, to finally become Chaos himself. Fearful of chaos infection, Lufenia severs their connection with Cornelia, but warn Jack that Warriors of Light will rise to resist him. This gives Jack the epiphany that he can use his power to create conditions on Cornelia that will cause true Warriors of Light native to Cornelia to rise so they will no longer have to rely on Lufenia for protection. He then finds himself transported 2000 years in Cornelia's past by Ash, Jed, Neon, and Sophia, who have become his Four Fiends. As his friends lay the groundwork to create the Warriors of Light, Jack embraces his family name Garland and waits in his throne room as the Warriors of Light arrive to challenge him.

However, once the true Warriors of Light arrive to challenge Jack in battle, they are easily vanquished. Jack then meets with the dragon king Bahamut and, after completing a series of trials, arranges a deal that will empower the Warriors of Light in future cycles. Jack challenges the Warriors again in a future cycle and, though he bests them again, finds greater hope that their improving strength will one day be enough to defeat him. Jack and his companions later partner with allies from different dimensions to eliminate remaining threats to Jack's goals, such as a Lufenian named Nil and an emperor from another universe, before the Warriors of Light finally become strong enough many cycles later to defeat Jack and restore light to Cornelia, ending the cycle once and for all.

== Development ==
Stranger of Paradise is co-developed by franchise creator Square Enix and Koei Tecmo division Team Ninja. It is co-directed by Daisuke Inoue from Square Enix and Hiroya Usuda and Nobumichi Kumabe from Team Ninja; co-produced by Jin Fujiwara from Square Enix and Fumihiko Yasuda from Team Ninja. The story and scenario were written by Stellavista Ltd. freelancer scriptwriter Kazushige Nojima. Longtime Square Enix employee Tetsuya Nomura created the original concept, and acts as character designer and creative producer in the game. The music is composed by Naoshi Mizuta, with additional contributions by Hidenori Iwasaki and Ryo Yamazaki. Nomura created the initial idea for Origin after production finished on Dissidia 012 Final Fantasy, imagining an action-focused game about conquering locations. When later approached for a new Final Fantasy concept, he combined this initial concept with a different concept of a game series focusing on Final Fantasy's villain Garland, as an angry older protagonist to create the final concept. Due to the shift in tone, Nomura originally thought it would be an original title, but Inoue and Fujiwara pushed for its inclusion in the franchise.

The aim behind the title was a mature, "brutal" take on the Final Fantasy series that would separate it from the rest of the franchise while still retaining connections to it. The gameplay was designed to emulate Team Ninja's known style of challenging action combat; Team Ninja had previously worked with Square Enix on Dissidia Final Fantasy NT. The job system, a recurring feature of Final Fantasy, took inspiration from the system created for Final Fantasy V, with Inoue saying there were more jobs than that game featured in Stranger of Paradise. The game combines the job system with Soulslike gameplay elements. The level designs deliberately emulated or referenced other numbered entries, such as a wooded wetland area taking inspiration from the Sunleth Waterscape from Final Fantasy XIII.

Rather than a remake of the first Final Fantasy, it was decided that Stranger of Paradise would be a new storyline using the original as inspiration, focusing on examining the role and goals of Warriors of Light. In contrast to the pale crystals used across most of the series, the red crystals and blood-colored elements of artwork emphasised the darker tone. Commenting on the scenario, Nojima highlighted one line, "it's not a hope or a dream. It's like a hunger. A thirst", as the mainspring of the story. The subtitle had a dual meaning of the party literally being strangers in the game world, and the party being unwelcome in the game's "paradise". When asked during an interview with Digital Trends on whether or not the story was meant to be a prequel to the first Final Fantasy, Nojima answered that he personally considers the game to be a prequel, but it is ultimately left open to the player's interpretation. In contrast, Nomura stated that despite the story using the first Final Fantasy as a basis, it is not necessarily a prequel, sequel, or otherwise directly connected to it. Character Princess Sarah was designed by Roberto Ferrari, who emulated the original game's design for her. The key artwork was created by Square Enix's Image Studio CGI division under Nomura's supervision.

== Release ==
The game's existence was leaked by industry insiders in May 2021 and was shown during a Square Enix livestream forming part of E3 2021; its platforms are PlayStation 4, PlayStation 5, Windows via the Epic Games Store, Xbox One and Xbox Series X/S. A limited time trial version was also launched alongside the announcement, intended as a standalone demo to elicit feedback from players to finetune the game prior to release. During this early promotional stage, Square Enix decided to focus only on the opening section and early premise of the game, keeping other details secret. The trailer met with a mixed response from journalists and fans due to its tone and character designs. The demo was balanced so it was approachable using different playstyles, incorporating different job types and difficulty levels. At release, the demo was found to not launch due to corrupted files, prompting Square Enix to work on a fix. A patch was released on June 15, fixing the corrupted files and allowing the demo to be played. The patch came included with first-time downloads. Due to the initial troubles, the demo's availability was extended by two days.

Based on feedback from the first demo, the graphics and performance were improved, and commands were included for players to trigger party support commands manually. Nomura originally planned the game's marketing around the mystery of Jack's identity, but Fujiwara told Nomura that many Western fans correctly guessed that Jack was this game's version of Garland. In response, Nomura reworked the marketing to focus on how Jack became Garland, with the image of Garland carrying Sara becoming a key image related to both the opening and the second half of the narrative. On revealing Jack's identity before the game's release, Fujiwara told Polygon that "the team thought rather than having it suspended up in the air – with players kind of speculating 'Wait, this is a lot more violent than we'd expected. This hero character seems to be a lot older and more mature compared to your typical Final Fantasy protagonist' – rather than misleading people, the team felt that it would be better if we were more transparent about what the story was going to be about. That's why we decided that we wanted to reveal this as a story about the villain, but that there is a rich story behind it that we want to show".

The game was released on March 18, 2022. A second demo was released between October 1 and October 11, allowing players to try out the multiplayer content. The demo also included an expanded version of the first demo's single-player content. A third and final demo was released on March 10, 2022, and was available until April 19.

=== Downloadable content ===
The first downloadable content for the game, titled Trials of the Dragon King, was released on July 20, 2022, containing a story expansion, new jobs, accessories and equipment. The second downloadable content, titled Wanderer of the Rift, was released on October 26, featuring a new side mission, a new job, new summoned monsters, new equipment and a new class of monsters. The final downloadable content, titled Different Future, was released on January 27, 2023, and features additional story content, new jobs and other additional gameplay content.

== Reception ==
Reception

Aggregate score
Aggregator	Score
Metacritic	(PC) 67/100 (PS5) 72/100 (XSXS) 66/100

Review scores
Publication	Score
Destructoid	8.5/10
Game Informer	7/10
GameSpot	7/10
GamesRadar+	2.5/5
Hardcore Gamer	3.5/5
IGN	8/10
Push Square	6/10
RPGFan	87/100
VentureBeat	4/5
VG247	3/5

Stranger of Paradise: Final Fantasy Origin received "mixed or average" reviews, according to review aggregator Metacritic.

Destructoid liked the level design, combat, and job variety, and especially praised the tone, writing: "It's not for everyone, despite how much the Final Fantasy name might bring people in. It's a Team Ninja action game first, and an oddball isekai story second...it wears its flaws on its sleeve". Game Informer reviewed the game less positively, criticizing its story, level design, and the lack of an incentive to engage with enemies, while praising the locales, combat, classes, and customization, concluding: "Stranger of Paradise is the strangest Final Fantasy game yet, bounding wildly between awful and fantastic. If you can tolerate Jack (and that's a big ask), the excellently crafted combat is worth a look". IGN gave the game an 8 out of 10: "Its overly complex story and one-dimensional NPCs don't pay off until the final hours, but the freedom available in its challenging combat and extensive character customization is consistently rewarding from the start...It's a love letter to its own source material, filled with references and homages to the series' history that seem designed to give fans of any Final Fantasy something to enjoy". VentureBeat gave the game 4 stars out of 5; although critical to the graphics, characters and the story, the magazine considered the game as fun. GameSpot and GamesRadar+ praised the gameplay while citing the incoherent story, characters, level design, and unstable frame rate as negatives. Push Square cited the game's campy tone, music, boss battles, a singular good character, and the reverence for Final Fantasy as the game's positives while also writing negatively about the graphical issues, edgy protagonist, supporting cast, and incomprehensible story.

=== Sales ===
In Japan, Stranger of Paradise: Final Fantasy Origin sold 46,849 physical units in its launch week, with the PlayStation 4 version selling 28,944 physical copies, making it the best-selling retail game of the week in the country. The PlayStation 5 version was the fourth-best-selling retail game in Japan during the same week, with 17,905 copies being sold. It sold over 57,000 physical units in Japan during its launch month, with the PS4 version selling over 36,000 units and ranking among the top ten best-selling games of the month.

In the United States, Stranger of Paradise was among the top ten best-selling games of March 2022 in its launch month. In the United Kingdom, it was the eighth-best-selling game in its launch week.
