= Guardian Cross =

2012 video game

- Developer: Square Enix
- Publisher: Square Enix
- Producer: Shinichi Tatsuke
- Designer: Hiroyuki Ito
- Artist: Ryoma Ito
- Composer: Naoshi Mizuta
- Platforms: iOS, Android
- Release: iOS: WW: September 13, 2012; Android: WW: August 5, 2013
- Genres: Card Game, role-playing game
- Modes: Single-player, Multiplayer

Guardian Cross (ガーディアンクルス, Gādian Kurusu) is a smartphone game for iOS and Android, created by Square Enix. It was released on September 13, 2012, for iOS, and on August 5, 2013, for Android. In it, the player captures creatures to form a deck of cards that they use to battle human and computer opponents. Battles take place as turn-based matches on the device, while capturing creatures is a first person shooter mini-game. Although reviews were not complimentary towards the game, it sold well. The multiplayer servers for the game were shut down on January 10, 2017.

== Gameplay ==
The player is given the job of capturing creatures, or "Guardians," many of which take their names from characters in works of high-caliber literature and classic mythologies from around the world, to become part of their deck from a selection of potentially hundreds of cards to unleash upon computer and human opponents. The game features two modes of play; turn based card game against a single opponent, and a first person shooter mini-game to track and subdue Guardians for recruitment. The game also has online multiplayer modes where players can battle and trade cards with players worldwide.

== Plot ==
Players assume the role of two Guardian masters named Bran and Athran, who serve the Empress of the land of Northern Cross. Using a magical rifle, the player must tame Guardians, train them, and use them in battles with both human and computer opponents. Players use their Guardians to go on quests to uncover why the Guardians have awakened from a thousand-year dormancy.

== Development ==
The concept of Guardian Cross was created by Active Time Battle designer and Square Enix director Hiroyuki Ito. Producer Shinichi Tatsuke at first tasked Ito with the creation of a battle system for a new game. However, the plan changed and Tatsuke then told him he had a different project in mind. The producer now requested a concept for a social game which he felt was an interesting opportunity to have Ito work on, given his experience with simple Nintendo Entertainment System game systems. The development team that implemented this concept to Guardian Cross was previously responsible for Knights of the Crystals. The director of the card illustrations was Ryoma Ito, who had previously served as the character designer of Final Fantasy Tactics Advance and Final Fantasy Tactics A2: Grimoire of the Rift. The character designs of Guardian Cross were done by Akira Oguro, who had previously served as the character designer of Final Fantasy Dimensions. The composer was Naoshi Mizuta, who had previously served as the composer of Final Fantasy XI.

In January 2012, Square Enix registered a trademark for the title Guardian Cross. In February 2012 it was revealed to be registered to Square's download games division and was announced first for iOS and later for Android mobile operating systems. It was to be released in the Spring, in both English and Japanese. After being delayed, the game was shown at E3 in June 2012 as part of Square Enix's upcoming games for iOS. The game was eventually released on September 13, 2012, and is the first Free-to-play game released on iOS by Square Enix.

During the original launch of the game, as a cross promotion with their MMORPG games Final Fantasy XI and Final Fantasy XIV, rare cards depicting monsters from both games could be earned by sending invitations to friends to join Guardian Cross. Another cross promotion done from 20 December 2012 until 7 January 2013. It allowed players to fight and capture the four Elemental Archfiends of Final Fantasy IV. A special coliseum became available from 26 December 2012 until 31 December 2012. It allowed players to capture Golbez. Cross promotion done again from March 26, 2013, until 16 April 2013. It allowed players to fight and capture the "super bosses" of Final Fantasy V. Another opportunity to obtain the Final Fantasy V cards and some additional cards from the game, such as Gilgamesh, was provided from 10 July 2013 until 15 July 2013. Cross promotion was done again from August 26, 2013, until September 30, 2013. It allowed players to fight and capture the primals of Eorzea from Final Fantasy XIV: A Realm Reborn.

== Reception ==
Pocket Gamer awarded the game a 5 out of ten, calling it "boring", and noting that without the use of in-app purchases, players had to wait to play the single player game, and would not be able to access powerful enough cards to be competitive in the multiplayer matches. However, Modojo awarded the game 4 out of 5, calling it, "A highly polished card battler, with some fresh gameplay twists."

=== Sales ===
Square Enix stated that they are "very happy" with community reaction to the game and its pricing model. The Guardian listed the game among its Top 20 mobile games of the week, noting Square Enix's many attempts in 2012 to experiment with different game genres on mobile platforms. Guardian Cross was in the top 100 highest-grossing games, and the top 150 free games in the iTunes App Store. The game was the only Square Enix game in the top 200 top-grossing applications in the iTunes App store in October 2012. By September 2014, the game had reached over 1.7 million downloads.
