= Blood of Bahamut =

2009 video game

- The logo for Blood of Bahamut
- Developer(s): Think & Feel
- Publisher(s): Square Enix
- Director(s): Motomu Toriyama; Takanari Ishiyama
- Artist(s): Toshitaka Matsuda; Airi Yoshioka
- Writer(s): Motomu Toriyama
- Composer(s): Naoshi Mizuta
- Platform(s): Nintendo DS
- Release: JP: August 6, 2009
- Genre(s): Action role-playing
- Mode(s): Single-player, multiplayer

Blood of Bahamut (ブラッド オブ バハムート, Buraddo obu Bahamūto) is an action role-playing video game developed by Think & Feel and published by Square Enix. It was released for the Nintendo DS in Japan on August 6, 2009.

== Gameplay ==
Blood of Bahamut is an action role-playing game in which up to four players battle giant beasts that are featured on both screens of the DS. In order to defeat a giant, players must first destroy its protective armor, then attack its "core," and finally attack its other body parts. The giants can summon smaller beasts, which the players must battle simultaneously. Defeating a giant's body and the smaller beasts will grant players "materials" which can be used to produce powerful weapons. The game contains over 130 missions.

== Plot ==
The game is set in a city built on the back of a great beast known as a Gigant. The city suddenly gets attacked and protagonists Ibuki and Yui must defend it, along with other cities that were built on Gigants that are awakening. The story features seven main characters in total. The Gigants are sentient, and will also attempt to defend themselves, taking part in battles. The Gigants include Bahamut, Ifrit, Shiva, Fenrir, and Gilgamesh, many of which are also summon monsters depicted in Square Enix's popular Final Fantasy series.

=== Characters ===
- Ibuki (イブキ): The male main protagonist armed with a sword. He is a summoner with the power of the White Dragon residing in his body.
- Yui (ユイ): Female main protagonist and Gigant-clan member who wields a cane staff.
- Kamo-Ogre (カモ＝オウガ, Kamo-Ouga): Commander of the Ifrit clan, uses a battle axe.
- Santiago (サンチャゴ, Sanchago): Fenrir clan elder, wields a spear.
- Ryuma (リュマ) Broke from the Shiva clan to travel the world as a 'free spirit', wields a handheld cannon.
- Ren (レン): Another Gigant clan swordsman. Wields a samurai's katana.
- Aslan (アスラン, Asuran): Knight of unknown origins, wields a greatsword.

== Development ==
Blood of Bahamut was directed by Motomu Toriyama, who previously worked on numerous other Square Enix titles including Bahamut Lagoon, a tactical role-playing game for the Super Famicom. Before its official announcement, the trademarking of Blood of Bahamut prompted rumours of a connection to Bahamut Lagoon. Such a connection has not been confirmed or denied by Square Enix. Blood of Bahamut was produced by Eisuke Yokoyama, who recently worked on Final Fantasy XII: Revenant Wings. The team stated that their goal was to "[...] cross the limits of the DS with a dynamic feel and with a direct sense of control." The game's music is composed by Naoshi Mizuta. The official soundtrack was released in Japan on August 12, 2009.

Ignition Entertainment attempted to license the game to bring it overseas to the North American market; however, Square Enix declined the offer. Ignition's Shane Bettenhausen elaborated, "We just contacted them and they weren’t interested in licensing it. That was the kind of deal where they [Square Enix] were probably not going to publish it here so it was worth a shot."

== Reception ==
Famitsu gave Blood of Bahamut a score of 31 out of 40. The game sold 66,000 copies the month of its release. Sales of the game reached around 89,200 copies by the end of 2009. It went on to reach 103,829 copies sold by the end of 2010.
