= Mobius Final Fantasy =

2015 video game

- The Japanese logo for Mobius Final Fantasy
- Developer: Square Enix Business Division 1
- Publisher: Square Enix
- Directors: Motomu Toriyama; Naoki Hamaguchi; Takashi Shiraga
- Producer: Yoshinori Kitase
- Artists: Toshitaka Matsuda; Shintaro Takai; Toshiyuki Itahana
- Writers: Daisuke Watanabe; Kazushige Nojima
- Composer: Mitsuto Suzuki
- Series: Final Fantasy
- Engine: Unity
- Platforms: iOS, Android, Microsoft Windows
- Release: iOS, Android: JP: June 4, 2015; WW: August 3, 2016; Microsoft Windows: JP: November 1, 2016; WW: February 6, 2017
- Genre: Role-playing
- Mode: Single-player

Mobius Final Fantasy (Japanese: メビウスファイナルファンタジー, Hepburn: Mebiusu Fainaru Fantajī) was an episodic role-playing video game developed and published by Square Enix for iOS, Android, and Microsoft Windows. It was released in Japan in June 2015, and internationally in August 2016. The players could control Warrior of Light (Wol), a man who wakes with amnesia in the world of Palamecia, and must help conquer the dark forces attacking its people. The game featured gameplay elements from previous Final Fantasy titles, including leveling, exploration via standard navigation and fast-travel systems, and turn-based combat tied to a job system. Common themes were also drawn from the original Final Fantasy title, such as "warriors of light" and their fight against chaos and darkness.

The game, which began development in early 2014, was developed around the concept of a mobile game on a similar level to a home console game and "a rich gaming experience, anytime, anywhere". This prompted skepticism from both in-house staff and external sources. While some assets were outsourced, most of the development was done internally by Square Enix's Business Division 1. Multiple staff from previous Final Fantasy titles were involved in development, including producer Yoshinori Kitase; director Motomu Toriyama, project leader Naoki Hamaguchi, character designer Toshiyuki Itahana and composer Mitsuto Suzuki.

The game registered over two million players within the first few weeks of release. Square Enix cited Mobius Final Fantasy as one of the most successful mobile titles they released in 2015, having over three million downloads in Japan before the end of the year. The English version also reached one million downloads within a week, with over three million in under a month. The graphics and gameplay were praised by reviewers, although some called the overall combat experience "simple". It was awarded as one of the Apple App Store's best games of 2015 in Japan. It was also awarded for being the most beautiful game on the Google Play Store in 19 countries for 2016. Mobius surpassed 10 million downloads in January 2017 with millions more since. In May 2019, ahead of the Japanese version's 4th anniversary, the game had reached 20 million downloads worldwide.

The game's service ended on March 31, 2020, in Japan and on June 30 worldwide.

== Gameplay ==
The battle system displaying the player character's health and energy, the ability icons, and Elements accumulating in the bar along the top of the screen. The enemy's health and break meter are displayed above it.

Mobius Final Fantasy is a role-playing game designed for mobile phones. The players could control the game's protagonist Warrior of Light (Wol) while navigating Palamecia. Players could customize settings, graphical quality, and adjust controls for their dominant hand. During local navigation on the field map, the players had to tap a location on a map for the character to travel. In some self-contained areas, the players could directly control the character. Along with standard navigation, the players could navigate the game world using a fast-travel system, progressively unlocked as they progressed through the story. Many of the features in the game, such as the leveling system and exploration, were similar to those from previous home console Final Fantasy games.

Mobius featured a tactics-focused, turn-based battle system, in which the players were able to activate attacks by tapping enemies on screen. Players could use standard melee attacks with close-range weapons such as swords, and magical attacks. During combat the players could accumulate Elements, which were necessary to activate Abilities, the game's form of summoned monsters. When ready for activation, a tile appeared on-screen that the player touched to activate the Ability. Abilities had different attributes: the Shiva Ability unleashed an ice attack, while the Fat Chocobo Ability raised defense for eight turns while automatically healing the player. Elements were used by the player to strengthen their resistance to elemental attacks. If an enemy's weakness was struck enough times, their "break gauge" meter was drained and they were weakened, allowing the player to attack freely. A job system and character abilities related to them formed a key part of the system.

The players started off with the Onion Knight job. Each job could be leveled up using special "seed" items collected in battle to fill in a skill panel. Once the panel was completed, the job evolved, such as the Onion Knight evolving into the pure Warrior class. As jobs changed or evolved, the character's appearance was altered to a degree. In the Chapter Two content update, Samurai, Assassin, and Red Mage jobs were added. In February 2016, multiplayer functionality was added, enabling up to four players to take on bosses.

== Plot ==
=== Season 1 ===
Wol, the main protagonist, awakes stricken with amnesia in the foreign world of Palamecia. He is one of multiple "Blanks", people brought to Palamecia from other worlds and suffering from amnesia. Palamecia is under attack from the armies of "Chaos", and Wol must fulfill a prophecy in Palamecia that one of the Blanks is a "Warrior of Light" who will free the world from its darkness. Wol is aided on his journey by Princess Sarah Lotte Cornelia, the princess of a kingdom of Palamecia, and Mog, a moogle who volunteers to help in Wol's quest.

Chapter 2, entitled "Prediction and Hope", includes Wol and Mog adventuring through the Ishtar desert and Rune Temple. A side quest was also included, entitled "El Dorado of the Oblivion", which is set in the ruins of "Gold Volost of El Dorado".

In chapter 3, Wol is traveling to see Princess Sarah, who is waiting at her castle when she is attacked and held captive by the armies of chaos. Wol is then tasked with saving the princess and fighting against the overwhelming power of the Chaos Giants.

In the chapter 4 prologue, Wol and Sarah begin an adventure to find the "Rune of Earth" to keep it out of the hands of Chaos, and later in chapter 4 the story continues through new lands. In chapter 5, Wol journeys to find the source of the light that may give him the strength to conquer Chaos. The sixth chapter shifted focus onto a different character, the heretic sorceress Meia. Wol meets up with Meia, and together, they journey to free Palamecia from its cycle of hope. The seventh chapter involves the two making their way through the final trials to fulfill the prophecy of the Warrior of Light. In Chapter 8, the two, along with Garland and Sarah head off to face Chaos at their final destination, "the Gate of Hope". Once there, they discover that the purpose of the world and the prophecy is to generate and accumulate the "Light of Hope" and transfer it to another faraway world; and this process would continue in an endless cycle, having Chaos resurrect each time, unleashing a flood of darkness that erases everyone's memory, then re-using the first Warrior of Light's journey as a blueprint for the narrative of the prophecy with each loop. Knowing this, Wol chooses to end the cycle by killing Chaos and preventing its resurrection, freeing the inhabitants of the world from its laws. During this, the Gate of Hope opens, and Garland flees from the world. Meanwhile, Wol, Sarah, and Meia are then seen slumbering inside of crystals in an unknown location.

=== Season 2: Warrior of Despair ===
Wol, Meia, and Sarah now live in a Palamecia free from its laws, where the entire world's populace has lost their memories of the prior events and begin their lives anew. Sarah, having chosen to lose her memory as well, assumes Wol to be her brother and trains under Meia's supervision. Meanwhile, Wol lives a relatively calm and repetitive life helping out with the everyday problems of the village of Omega, primarily as a fiend hunter.

Elsewhere, two individuals, Sophie and Graff, separately come across strange artifacts. These "runes" show them visions of a grand city, and an ongoing conflict between two factions, the "Free Citizens" and "The Collective". In these visions, they come across each other, referring to one another as siblings. Believing these runic visions and their relationship to be connections to their past, they each journey to seek each other out.

Graff comes across more runes, laid before him by faeries who manipulate the events seen within them. They desire to change his nature to that of cruel and violent one who will bring despair to the world in the absence of Chaos. Sophie's journey finds her coming across the same Echo that traveled with Wol on his previous journey. Along the way, the two encounter Blanks who turn to Sophie for leadership and she in turn inspires them, unaware of the faeries' machinations in trying to make her into a new Warrior of Light.

== Development ==
The concept behind Mobius was for a mobile experience comparable with console games and "a rich gaming experience, anytime, anywhere". Though it was possible to make a smartphone game equivalent to console games, it had yet to be done, so game producer Yoshinori Kitase sought to fill this perceived gap in the market. It was called the first Final Fantasy mobile game of this scale. While creation of some artwork and graphics was outsourced, most of the concept work and development was done in-house by Square Enix's Business Division 1. Instead of a new development team dedicated to mobiles, the production team was largely made up of veterans from the console Final Fantasy titles. The staff included scenario supervisor Kazushige Nojima and producer Yoshinori Kitase. The story is connected to the original Final Fantasy only thematically through its focus on "warriors of light" fighting against chaos and darkness: it is not a remake or directly related to the plot of the original. It is also considered by the team behind the game as a full entry in the series rather than a spin-off. Speaking after the game's initial release, Nojima stated that he felt his scenario was too bulky for a mobile experience.

Development began in early 2014, and prompted skepticism from both Square Enix staff and its prospective platform managers, who were more used to the dominant 2D-based mobile games. One of the problems cited by project leader Naoki Hamaguchi was creating realistic facial expressions equivalent to those used in the 2013 film Frozen. For development, the team used the Unity game engine. The development team built a relationship with the team at Unity Technologies very early in the development of Unity 5 and this allowed them to have their opinions included in the engine. Despite being dependent on the Unity 5 engine, the team also customised the game editor portion themselves. The team needed to take differences between different phone models into account to allow high performance. To help with development and overcome potential difficulties handling the Unity engine, a special development environment and structure was created. The team used physically based rendering to create realistic lighting and environmental effects. The budget was far lower than graphically equivalent console titles, so the team were reluctant to buy in helping tools and had restrictions on staff numbers: one person was working on all the game's backgrounds, while three were in charge of character designs. Using experience from the development of Final Fantasy XIII, the team were able to create high-end graphics within mobile restrictions.

The team originally wanted to release the global version at the same time as the Japanese version. However, since they also wanted to maintain a direct level of control over the development and operation of the title rather than outsourcing it like Square Enix usually does, the global version was delayed by a year. Direct operation allows them to ensure quality and directly take player feedback and reflect it into the service.

The characters were designed by Toshiyuki Itahana. In common with his typical drawing style for characters, Itahana created Wol to be a heroic fantasy character that both fitted within and did not conform to earlier Final Fantasy titles. He and other designers created the multiple job outfits to further convey the fantasy setting. After its reveal, some changes were made to the character's initial costume: due to negative player feedback about the amount of skin shown, the Onion Swordsman outfit was adjusted to be more covering. The game's environments were designed by Takako Miyake, who had previously worked on console Final Fantasy titles. She did not change her working style for Mobius Final Fantasy: all the assets were designed in high definition, and only adjusted slightly when they were brought into the mobile environment. The visual effects were handled by company veteran Shintaro Takai, whose main preoccupation was to make sure the game did not slow down during the flashier visual combat effects due to hardware constraints. The cutscenes were not affected by these issues.

=== Music ===
The music for Mobius Final Fantasy was composed by Mitsuto Suzuki, whose previous work includes The 3rd Birthday, Final Fantasy XIII-2 and Lightning Returns: Final Fantasy XIII. When he was first asked to compose for the title, his impression was of a whole new setting that retained nostalgic elements from earlier games in the series, which he sought to incorporate into the score: a piece that encompassed this was his reorchestration of "Prelude". As part of writing for the game, he needed to create new tracks for game updates, which put added pressure on him to create music that would appeal to players. A concept present from an early stage was changing the battle music depending on what job was equipped by the player: Suzuki created an initial battle theme that acted as a base for other themes, then added elements like electronic elements and vocal work to give derivative tracks variety. The majority of the game's choral work, such as with the game's main theme, was done using synthesizers. Suzuki also needed to do remixes of earlier Final Fantasy music, such as the "Chocobo" theme, and pieces from other Final Fantasy games that would appear in special in-game events. Suzuki estimated that he created between 40-50 songs for the game. The music was recorded at the Red Bull Studios in Tokyo.

An official 2-CD soundtrack album for the game, Mobius Final Fantasy Original Soundtrack, was released through Square Enix's music label on February 26, 2015, under the catalog number SQEX-10534-5. The music on the album covers Chapters 1 to 3. According to Suzuki, this was due to the music feeling like it had reached a natural transition point by that stage of the game.

A second soundtrack album for the game was released on August 2, 2017. It features all of the music from chapters 4 to 8 along with music from the special events.

A third soundtrack album was released digitally on June 30, 2020, the same day as the game's worldwide end-of-service.

== Release ==
A trademark for its original title, "Mevius Final Fantasy", was filed by Square Enix in October 2014. The game was officially announced in Famitsu two months later under the same name. Two days later, a teaser site was opened in both English and Japanese with a message from Kitase about the team's vision for the game. Its final name was announced during a livestream by the company dedicated to the game. Both titles, along with the logo artwork, took inspiration from the concept of the Möbius strip. Because of its origin, the title was changed from Mevius to Mobius. It was also apparently done in preparation for an international release. Pre-registration for Mobius opened in April 2015, with a special weapon and item available to those who registered. In late 2015, no localization had been officially announced, though Kitase revealed through the Final Fantasy Portal App that it was under consideration. In a later post on the app during first anniversary celebrations for the game, Kitase confirmed that a global version was in development. The global version was released on August 3, 2016, for iOS and Android in English, Traditional Chinese and Korean. It was later released for Microsoft Windows via Steam in Japan on November 1, 2016, and worldwide on February 6, 2017, in English, Traditional Chinese and Korean. French and German support was added to the global version via iOS, Android and Steam on February 6.

Act 1	Release date
Chapter 1: Blank Slate (第1章 空白の運命, Dai Isshō: Kūhaku no Unmei; lit. '"Chapter 1: The Fate of the Blank"')	JP: June 4, 2015; WW: August 3, 2016
Chapter 2: Hope and Prophecy (第2章 予言と希望, Dai Nishō: Yogen to Kibō; lit. '"Chapter 2: Prophecy and Hope"')	JP: July 1, 2015; WW: August 3, 2016
Chapter 3: Chaos and the Crown (第3章 戦場の王女, Dai Sanshō: Senjō no Ōjo; lit. '"Chapter 3: The Princess of the Battlefield"')	Part I: JP: August 1, 2015; WW: October 5, 2016; Part II: JP: September 1, 2015; WW: December 7, 2016
Chapter 4 Prologue: A New Light (第4章プロローグ 新たなる輝き, Dai Yonshō Purorōgu: Aratanaru Kagayaki; lit. '"Chapter 4 Prologue: A New Glow"')	JP: November 1, 2015; WW: January 10, 2017
Chapter 4: Doubt and Illusion (第4章 幻想と疑問, Dai Yonshō: Gensō to Gimon; lit. '"Chapter 4: Illusion and Doubt"')	Part I: JP: December 1, 2015; WW: January 23, 2017; Part II: JP: January 1, 2016; WW: March 2, 2017
Chapter 5: The First Warrior (第5章 はじまりの戦士, Dai Goshō: Hajimari no Senshi; lit. '"Chapter 5: The Warrior of the Beginning"')	Part I: JP: April 1, 2016; WW: June 1, 2017; Part II: JP: May 1, 2016; WW: July 2, 2017
Chapter 6: Bewitching Memories (第6章 追憶の魔女, Dai Rokushō: Tsuioku no Majo; lit. '"Chapter 6: The Witch of Reminiscence"')	Part I: JP: October 8, 2016; WW: October 3, 2017; Part II: JP: November 19, 2016; WW: November 2, 2017
Chapter 7: The Light of Hope (第7章 希望の光, Dai Nanashō: Kibō no Hikari; lit. '"Chapter 7: The Light of Hope"')	Part I: JP: April 22, 2017; WW: March 9, 2018; Part II: JP: May 9, 2017; WW: March 20, 2018
Final Chapter: Closing the Loop (最終章 終極のメビウス, Sai Shūshō: Shūkyoku no Mebiusu; lit. '"Final Chapter: The Last Mobius"')	Part I: JP: June 11, 2017; WW: May 7, 2018; Part II: JP: July 15, 2017; WW: May 22, 2018

Act 2	Release date
Warrior of Despair: Prologue - The Slumbering Warriors (破滅の戦士篇 プロローグ 眠れる戦士たち, Hametsu no Senshi-hen: Purorōgu - Nemureru Senshi-tachi; lit. '"Warrior of Ruin Act: Prologue - The Sleeping Warriors"')	JP: April 11, 2018; WW: November 15, 2018
Warrior of Despair - Chapter 1: A World Adrift (破滅の戦士篇 第１章 予言なき世界, Hametsu no Senshi-hen - Dai Isshō: Yogen Naki Sekai; lit. '"Warrior of Ruin Act - Chapter 1: A World Without Prophecy"')	Part I: JP: April 27, 2018; WW: December 17, 2018; Part II: JP: May 11, 2018; WW: January 7, 2019; Part III: JP: May 18, 2018; WW: January 15, 2019
Warrior of Despair - Chapter 2: The Calm (破滅の戦士篇 第２章 凪の日常, Hametsu no Senshi-hen - Dai Nishō: Nagi no Nichijō)	Part I: JP: July 11, 2018; WW: March 15, 2019; Interlude: Graff: JP: July 20, 2018; WW: March 1, 2019; Part II: JP: August 22, 2018; WW: March 15, 2019
Warrior of Despair - Chapter 3: A Step into the Unknown (破滅の戦士 第３章 未知なる一歩, Hametsu no Senshi - Michinaru Ippo)	Sophie: JP: August 31, 2018; WW: May 8, 2019; Graff: JP: September 14, 2018; WW: May 16, 2019; Part III: JP: September 26, 2018; WW: May 23, 2019
Warrior of Despair - Chapter 4: One Small Pebble (破滅の戦士 第４章 転がる石のように, Hametsu no Senshi - Korogaruishi no yō ni)	Sophie & Graff: JP: October 12, 2018; WW: May 31, 2019; Part II: JP: October 24, 2018; WW: June 15, 2019
Warrior of Despair - Chapter 5: Entwined Fates (破滅の戦士 第５章 運命の乱流, Hametsu no Senshi - Unmei no Ranryū)	Sophie: JP: November 7, 2018; WW: July 1, 2019; Part II: JP: November 21, 2018; WW: July 8, 2019; Graff: JP: November 28, 2018; WW: July 16, 2019
Warrior of Despair - Chapter 6: New Encounters (破滅の戦士 第6章 新たな出会い, Hametsu no Senshi - Aratana Deai)	Part I: JP: March 18, 2019; WW: October 1, 2019; Sophie: JP: April 1, 2019; WW: October 16, 2019
Warrior of Despair - Chapter 7: A Changing Tale (破滅の戦士 第7章 変わりゆく物語, Hametsu no Senshi - Kawari Yuku Monogatari)	Sophie: JP: April 16, 2019; WW: November 1, 2019; Part II: JP: May 16, 2019; WW: November 15, 2019
Warrior of Despair - Chapter 8: A Feast of Despair (破滅の戦士 第8章 破滅の饗宴, Hametsu no Senshi - Hametsu no Kyōen)	Graff: JP: July 1, 2019; WW: December 1, 2019; Sophie: JP: July 19, 2019; WW: December 9, 2019; Part III: JP: August 16, 2019; WW: December 16, 2019
Warrior of Despair - Chapter 9: From Light, Shadow (破滅の戦士 第9章 光の陰に, Hametsu no Senshi - Hikari no in ni)	Part I: JP: September 19, 2019; WW: February 1, 2020; Part II: JP: October 7, 2019; WW: February 15, 2020
Warrior of Despair - Final Chapter: A Tale of Hope (破滅の戦士 最終章 希望の物語, Hametsu no Senshi - Kibō no Monogatari)	Part I: JP: November 1, 2019; WW: March 1, 2020; Part II: JP: December 2, 2019; WW: March 16, 2020

Collaboration events of varying scale occurred with many other Final Fantasy titles including new releases, other ongoing titles and Mobius's creators past and future titles. This included Final Fantasy Record Keeper, Type-0, VII Remake, XII, XIII, XV, VII, XIV, X, and VIII.

Events with Final Fantasy series creator Hironobu Sakaguchi's Terra Battle and Square Enix's Dragon Quest of the Stars also occurred in the game.

Final Fantasy VII Remake, XIII, VII, X and VIII have had original stories told alongside their respective games' stories with Final Fantasy XIII set between XIII-2 and Lightning Returns and Final Fantasy X between it and X-2. This was due to the involvement of lead developers from these titles on Mobius.

== Reception ==
Reception

Aggregate score
Aggregator	Score
Metacritic	73/100

Review score
Publication	Score
Pocket Gamer	4/5

During its pre-registration period, the game received 200,000 registered users. By July 12, just over a week after release, the game had one million registered players in Japan. This number had expanded to over two million by the following month. Speaking after release, Kitase said that Square Enix considered the game a success as it introduced the mobile community to AAA-style graphics. In Square Enix's 2015 annual report, Mobius was noted as one of their successful mobile titles for the year, stating that the higher production values when compared to other mobile games on the market had contributed to its popularity. In addition, Mobius was among the finalists for the 2015 Unity Awards for mobile games in the "Best 3D Visual Experience" category, and was named among Japan's "iTune's Best of 2015" by Apple Inc.

Dengeki Mobile, in a pre-release review, praised the gameplay and strategy present in early random encounters and boss battles, although the reviewer had minor reservations about the quality of the entire game as they were not able to play through all of it. They also stated that players might encounter difficulties during some boss battles. The reviewer summed up the experience as "simple, yet engaging". Famitsu, in a similar feature, praised the gameplay and presentation, echoing many of Dengeki's compliments. One thing they noted was that the performance needed to be adjusted for different mobiles as running the game rapidly drained the phones batteries when on its highest settings. The reviewer also recommended tablets over mobile phones as a means of playing the game. Western reviews were similarly mixed, with TouchArcade praising the games visuals but calling the user interface an "overly busy nightmare". Kotaku examined the game in July 2015 and called the gameplay "monotonous" and lacking in plot, though it noted that many chapters were still to be released. Victoria McNally from MTV.com questioned the developers' earlier decision to change the design of the male protagonist to make it less sexy and noted that numerous female video game characters, including Cindy Aurum from Final Fantasy XV, are still routinely depicted as scantily clad.

For the Western release of Mobius, the pre-registration exceeded 125,000 registered users.
