= Hiroyuki Ito =

Japanese video game designer

- Born: 伊藤 裕之
- Occupations: Video game producer, director, designer

Hiroyuki Ito (伊藤 裕之, Itō Hiroyuki) is a Japanese game producer, director and designer who works for Square Enix. He is known as the director of Final Fantasy VI (1994), Final Fantasy IX (2000) and Final Fantasy XII (2006) and as the creator of the Active Time Battle (ATB) system in the Final Fantasy series.

== Biography ==
After graduating from Tokyo Zokei University, Ito joined Square in 1987. He initially worked on Final Fantasy and Final Fantasy II as a debugger but first became genuinely involved with game development while creating sound effects for Final Fantasy III. His next major role was as the designer of the Active Time Battle system for Final Fantasy IV. Square filed a Japanese patent application related to the ATB system on 16 July 1991 and a corresponding US application on 16 March 1992. One Japanese patent (JP2794230) and two US patents (US5390937 and US5649862) were granted based on these applications. For Final Fantasy V, Ito designed the fully customizable Job system. He also created the 'Chicken Knife or Brave Blade' choosing event. Final Fantasy VI marked the first time that Ito became a director on a game. For this title, he was in charge of all battle aspects. He was also responsible for the battle systems in Final Fantasy VIII and Final Fantasy Tactics before he once more took on the role of director with Final Fantasy IX. Ito had the idea to make its protagonist Zidane Tribal flirtatious towards women.

In mid-2005, Square Enix announced that Yasumi Matsuno had left the company due to an illness but would be acting as a supervisor on Final Fantasy XII. Ito was appointed as the director of the game. Matsuno apologized for the long development time of the project but guaranteed players that it was "progressing in its development under the hands of excellent staffs". Ito created the License Board of Final Fantasy XII with the intention to give the player much freedom in developing characters to their liking without becoming too complicated. At the Square Enix Party 2007 pre-conference meeting in May 2007, he was introduced on stage as the producer and director of the newly announced Final Fantasy XII International Zodiac Job System. He stated later that he considered the game design and battle system of Final Fantasy XII a "definitive contribution to the gaming lexicon" and that it had "the potential to shine in future games". In about 2012, Ito was tasked by producer Shinichi Tatsuke with the creation of a battle system for a new game. However, the plan changed and he was told a week later that there was a different project to consider. Tatsuke now requested a concept for a social game which he felt was an interesting opportunity to have Ito work on, given his experience with simple Nintendo Entertainment System game systems. This concept became Guardian Cross. In September 2012, Ito said that he would work on another Final Fantasy game if the company's president wished for it. The corporate executive of Square Enix's 1st Production Department, Shinji Hashimoto, mentioned in July 2013 that Ito was "planning and doing some proposals for a new project" and "putting some ideas together".

== Game design and impact ==
As the game designer of a Final Fantasy game, Ito tries to balance the story and event scenes with the gameplay. When he begins his work on a title, he does not consider the story at hand but rather adapts his game system to it as closely as possible over the time. He thinks that it is his job to smoothly implement a game so the people in charge of the stories do not have to worry about this aspect. He also believes that the most important factor of the Final Fantasy series is the player's feeling of accomplishment after beating the game and seeing "The End" on the screen. Professional sports were the primary inspiration behind Ito's battle systems. The monsters in Final Fantasy IV and the Gambit system in Final Fantasy XII resemble aspects of the NFL in that their actions are based on the most likely outcome of a specific situation. The Active Time Battle system was similarly inspired by Formula One, as Ito had the idea to give characters different speed values after seeing a race in which the cars passed each other. These values would then become the basis for the battle system and dictate when it will be a character's turn.

At the CESA 2006 Japan Game Awards held on 22 September 2006, Ito accepted the "Grand Award" and "Award for Excellence" for Final Fantasy XII. He thanked the development team, longtime fans and new players alike and said that the team was grateful for the awards as they could not possibly think about the game's reception during its creation. His comment at the ceremony was: "I did my best to bring new and innovative elements to this work. I'm very happy that something like this, which was one of the more challenging games to create in the Final Fantasy series, has received this award. To return the favor to the users who've played this game and who regard it so highly, I'm determined to continue creating by always reminding myself of the need to rise to new challenges." Tetsuya Nomura considers Ito one of his four "seniors" at the company and a likely influence on his battle planning. He also stated that he was taught the basics of game design by Ito.

== Works ==
Year	Title	Credit(s)	Ref.
1987	Aliens: Alien 2	Developer	
1987	Final Fantasy	Debugger	
1988	Final Fantasy II	Debugger	
1989	Square's Tom Sawyer	Planning	
1989	Final Fantasy Legend	Scenario staff, cartography	
1990	Final Fantasy III	Sound effects	
1990	Rad Racer II	Game design	
1991	Final Fantasy IV	Battle design	
1992	Final Fantasy V	Battle design	
1994	Final Fantasy VI	Director, battle system design	
1995	Chrono Trigger	Event planning	
1996	Super Mario RPG	Special thanks	
1997	Final Fantasy Tactics	Game design, battle system main planner	
1999	Final Fantasy VIII	Battle system design	
2000	Final Fantasy IX	Director, battle system design	
2006	Final Fantasy XII	Director, game design, battle director	
2006	Final Fantasy V Advance	Supervisor	
2006	Final Fantasy VI Advance	Supervisor	
2007	Final Fantasy XII International Zodiac Job System	Producer, director, game design	
2007	Final Fantasy IV DS	Battle supervisor	
2009	Crawlian	Producer	
2009	Final Fantasy Crystal Chronicles: My Life as a Darklord	Special thanks	
2009	Gyromancer	Special thanks	
2011	Dissidia 012 Final Fantasy	Special thanks	
2012	Guardian Cross	Original concept	
2014	Deadman's Cross	Battle design	
2014	Murdered: Soul Suspect	Special thanks	
2015	Dissidia Final Fantasy NT	Special thanks	
2016	Guardian Codex	Special thanks	
2017	Final Fantasy XII: The Zodiac Age	Supervisor	
2021	Dungeon Encounters	Director, game design	
