= Demons' Score =

2012 video game

Demons’ Score
- Developer: iNiS
- Publisher: Square Enix
- Director: Hidehito Tanba
- Producer: Takashi Tokita
- Designer: Yoko Taro
- Artists: Akira Oguro; Jiro Tomioka
- Writer: Hidehito Tanba
- Composers: List: Naoshi Mizuta; Keiichi Okabe; Hiroki Kikuta; Yoko Shimomura; Takamichi Yashiki; Hirokazu Koshio; Shohei Tsuchiya; Kenichi Maeyamada; Kenji Ito; Kohei Tanaka; Hidenori Iwasaki; Ryo Yamazaki
- Engine: Unreal Engine 3
- Platforms: iOS, Android
- Release: 19 September 2012
- Genre: Rhythm
- Mode: Single-player

Demons' Score was a rhythm game developed by iNiS and published by Square Enix for iOS and Android. The gameplay is similar to another iNiS-developed game, Elite Beat Agents. The game was released for iOS in September 2012 and for on 21 December 2012. The game was disconnected on 29 September 2014.

== Story ==
Serenity is just an average college girl, but when she suddenly loses contact with her father, Dr. Alister, she sets out to find him at the Salem State Hospital & Asylum where he works. Serenity arrives to find she barely recognizes the hospital anymore. Stepping warily into the shattered ruins, she meets a talking teddy bear. Introducing himself as David, the talking teddy bear claims to have once been human, but when Serenity asks him about her father's whereabouts, countless demons suddenly appear. Just before her father disappeared, he had sent a mysterious app to her smartphone. Known as the Demons' Score, the app is a powerful program that enables her to take control of demons that possess her body.
