= Naoshi Mizuta =

Japanese composer (born 1972)

- Born: January 24, 1972 (age 54); Kochi, Japan
- Education: Chiba University
- Occupations: Composer, musician
- Years active: 1995–present
- Employers: Capcom (1995–1998); Square Enix (1998–present)
- Musical career
- Genres: Video game music; rock; orchestral; electronic; funk
- Instrument: Bass guitar

Naoshi Mizuta (水田 直志, Mizuta Naoshi; born January 24, 1972) is a Japanese video game composer and musician. He is best known for his work on the Final Fantasy franchise, most notably Final Fantasy XI, and has also composed music for games such as Street Fighter Alpha, Mega Man & Bass, and Parasite Eve II. He started his career at Capcom before moving to Square (now Square Enix) in 1998.

== Biography ==
Born in Kōchi, Japan in 1972, Mizuta's interest in music began to grow when he "was in the second or third grade". Although still interested in music, Mizuta studied law and economics at Chiba University. He composed his first song while in his last year there, and after graduating went to work for Capcom in 1994 as a composer. His first work was composing for Street Fighter Alpha in 1995 as part of a team of composers, and also worked on arranging the music for the PlayStation version later that year.

In 1998, he composed for Mega Man & Bass with Akari Kaida and Toshihiko Horiyama. While still working for Capcom, Mizuta applied to Square as a composer in response to an advertisement and was hired. His first assignment for Square was to score Parasite Eve II, for which he was the sole composer and spent a year and a half working on. The original Parasite Eve game was scored by Yoko Shimomura, and Mizuta incorporated some of the original game's musical themes into the sequel. Mizuta's next role was as the main composer for Final Fantasy XI, with assistance from Nobuo Uematsu and Kumi Tanioka. Mizuta remained with the Final Fantasy XI project for over ten years, serving as the sole composer for the game's subsequent expansions, and considers it his life's work. During this period, Mizuta became involved in The Star Onions, a band composed of Square Enix composers for which he plays bass guitar. Other members of the band, which plays arrangements of songs from Final Fantasy XI, include Tanioka, Hidenori Iwasaki, and Tsuyoshi Sekito. The band has since released two albums, Music from the Other Side of Vana'diel and Sanctuary.

Mizuta has also worked on several other projects for Square Enix, including Blood of Bahamut and Guardian Cross. He has also worked on many other games in the Final Fantasy series, including Final Fantasy: The 4 Heroes of Light, Final Fantasy XIII-2, Final Fantasy XIV, Final Fantasy XIV: A Realm Reborn, and Lightning Returns: Final Fantasy XIII.

== Musical style and influences ==
For games, Mizuta is primarily focused on creating music that fits the title and the scene at hand, without consideration for how it might sound in isolation. On older consoles, the hardware restricted composers to working with a limited number of channels, which challenged composers to create strong, memorable melodies without the aid of atmospheric and accompanying lines. Even without such constraints in modern titles, Mizuta feels that this style has its merits and is worth preserving in modern games. On the other hand, for alternative presentations of his music such as live performances or piano arrangements, Mizuta feels more free to have fun and play it however he likes. Mizuta is heavily influenced by the work of Ryuichi Sakamoto, as well as Nobuo Uematsu, his superior at Square. He also draws inspiration from a variety of film scores as well as fan remixes of his work on YouTube. He has cited acid jazz artists such as Jamiroquai, Incognito, and The Brand New Heavies as inspirations for his music while working at Capcom.

== Works ==
Year	Title	Notes
1995	Street Fighter Alpha	Arcade version; music with several others
1995	Street Fighter Alpha	PlayStation version; arrangements with Akari Kaida and Naoaki Iwami
1996	Ide Yōsuke Meijin no Shin Jissen Mahjong	Music with Naoaki Iwami, Makoto Tomozawa and Shusaku Uchiyama
1998	Resident Evil 2	Music ("The Underground Laboratory")
1998	Mega Man & Bass	Music with Toshihiko Horiyama and Akari Kaida
1999	Parasite Eve II	Music
2000	All Star Pro-Wrestling	Music with Kenichiro Fukui, Tsuyoshi Sekito, and Kumi Tanioka
2002	Final Fantasy XI	Music with Nobuo Uematsu and Kumi Tanioka
2002	Tetra Master	Music
2003	Final Fantasy XI: Rise of the Zilart	Music
2004	Final Fantasy XI: Chains of Promathia	Music
2005	Hanjuku Hero 4 ~The 7 Heroes~	Music ("Reckless Blood Manipulations" and "Hidden Research")
2006	Final Fantasy XI: Treasures of Aht Urhgan	Music
2007	Final Fantasy XI: Wings of the Goddess	Music
2007	The Shochu Bar	Music
2009	Final Fantasy XI: A Crystalline Prophecy: Ode of Life Bestowing	Music
2009	Final Fantasy XI: A Moogle Kupo d'Etat: Evil in Small Doses	Music
2009	Blood of Bahamut	Music
2009	Final Fantasy XI: A Shantotto Ascension: The Legend Torn, Her Empire Born	Music
2009	Final Fantasy: The 4 Heroes of Light	Music
2009	Season of Mystery: The Cherry Blossom Murders	Music
2010	Final Fantasy Dimensions	Music
2010	Final Fantasy XIV	Music with various others
2011	Final Fantasy XIII-2	Music with Masashi Hamauzu and Mitsuto Suzuki
2012	Guardian Cross	Music
2012	Demons' Score	Music (main theme)
2013	Final Fantasy XI: Seekers of Adoulin	Music
2013	Final Fantasy XIV: A Realm Reborn	Music with Masayoshi Soken, Tsuyoshi Sekito, and Ryo Yamazaki
2013	Lightning Returns: Final Fantasy XIII	Music with Masashi Hamauzu and Mitsuto Suzuki
2014	Deadman's Cross	Music
2014	Dragon Sky	Music
2014	Glorious Blades	Music
2014	Groove Coaster EX	Music ("OWARANAI Groove")
2014	The Irregular at Magic High School: Lost Zero	Music with Mitsuto Suzuki
2015	Arcadia no Aoki Miko	Music with YOHKA
2015	Final Fantasy Dimensions II	Music
2015	Final Fantasy XI: Rhapsodies of Vana'diel	Music
2015	Mobius Final Fantasy	Arrangement ("The Infinite Warrior")
2015	Final Fantasy Grandmasters	Music
2016	Akashic Re:cords	Music
2016	Guardian Codex	Music
2017	Pro Yakyuu ga Suki da! 2017	Music
2017	Final Fantasy XV: Episode Prompto	Music
2017	Pictlogica Final Fantasy	Music
2018	Final Fantasy Record Keeper	DLC; music with various others
2020	Engage Souls	Music
2020	Final Fantasy XI: The Voracious Resurgence	Music
2022	Stranger of Paradise: Final Fantasy Origin	Music with Hidenori Iwasaki and Ryo Yamazaki
2023	Shi-San-Sei Million Arthur	Music
