= Ultraman Powered (video game) =

1994 video game

- Developer: Tose
- Publisher: Bandai
- Director: Asamiroh Aigan
- Producer: Shigenori Kuwabara
- Composer: Kishou Yamanaka
- Series: Ultraman
- Platform: 3DO
- Release: JP: March 20, 1994
- Genre: Fighting
- Modes: Single-player, multiplayer

Ultraman Powered (Note: Japanese: ウルトラマンパワード, Hepburn: Urutoraman Pawādo) is a fighting game developed by Tose and published by Bandai for the 3DO Interactive Multiplayer. The player takes on the role of the extraterrestrial superhero Ultraman Powered, tasked with protecting the Earth from destructive aliens and monsters. Gameplay primarily consists of one-on-one battles where the player must deplete an adversary's health meter using both basic and special fighting techniques. The game also contains 3D rail shooter sections and a two-player versus option.

The game is based on the 1993 television series Ultraman: The Ultimate Hero, known in Japan as Ultraman Powered. The game was created using digitized backgrounds and character sprites from this series and uses clips from it as full-motion video (FMV) cutscenes. Ultraman Powered was released exclusively in Japan on March 20, 1994 as a launch title for the 3DO in that region. Global critical reception for the game has been mixed with many reviewers complimenting its graphics but panning its slow gameplay and controls.

== Gameplay ==
Ultraman Powered battles Talesdon in the Battle Mode's fourth stage. Both characters' health and special move gauges are displayed at the top.

Ultraman Powered is a fighting game based on the 1993 home video series Ultraman: The Ultimate Hero. The player takes on the role of the titular Ultraman Powered, an alien superhero who, alongside the Worldwide Investigation Network Response (WINR), must defend the Earth from hostile aliens and monsters. The core gameplay involves one-on-one battles between Ultraman and a single opponent. Each combatant has a health meter that the other must attempt to deplete in order to win the match. Attacks consist of basic punches and kicks as well as moves requiring more complex gamepad button combinations. A green power meter that constantly replenishes can be expended to perform special abilities like long-range projectiles. Matches have a time limit.

Ultraman Powered has a few options for a single player such as Visual Mode and Battle Mode. Visual Mode features long FMV clips from the series; it consists of only three matches and gives the player nine continues. Battle Mode contains eight matches, each preceded by a 3D rail shooter segment where the player briefly pilots a WINR aircraft in a first-person perspective. The ship's targeting cursor can be utilized to aim and fire upon a giant enemy, partially reducing its health, before the ship is taken down by it. Ultraman will then arrive and take over against the weakened foe. The player begins Battle Mode with three continues and a scoring system grants an extra continue every 30,000 points. Ultraman Powered also has multiplayer Versus Mode which allows two players to fight one another; one player controls Ultraman while the other can choose any unlocked alien or monster to control. This roster includes Baltan, Kemular, Red King, Talesdon, Dada, Jamila, Gomora, and Baltan II.

== Development and release ==
Ultraman Powered was developed by Tose and published by Bandai, the latter of which was the official licensor of the long-running Japanese Ultraman media franchise from Tsuburaya Productions. The game is specifically adapted from the 1993 home video series Ultraman: The Ultimate Hero, also known in Japan as Ultraman Powered. This show was the tenth Ultraman live-action series overall and the first in the franchise to be produced in the United States, having been filmed in Los Angeles. The FMV cutscenes featured between the game's battles are clips taken from the series. The game also utilizes digitized landscapes and character sprites lifted from the show. Ultraman Powered was one of the first games to be developed for the Japanese 3DO market. It was released exclusively in Japan as a launch title for the console on March 20, 1994.

== Reception ==
Reception

Review scores
Publication	Score
Computer and Video Games	42%
Famitsu	8/10, 6/10, 6/10, 5/10
M! Games	40%
Next Generation	2/5
Super Game Power	4.5/5
Ação Games	24/30
Computer+Videogiochi	79%
Génération 4	30%

Reception for Ultraman Powered has been mixed with positive remarks for its graphics and negative remarks for its gameplay. Many critics positively compared its 2D fighting presentation to SNK's Art of Fighting, which zooms in on the combatant sprites as they approach one another. Mark Wynne of the UK publication 3DO Magazine relates this same feature to that of Way of the Warrior and complimented Ultraman Powered's digitized backgrounds and characters as well as the "brilliant" look of its shooting sections. The Brazilian magazine Ação Games called the game a "must-see" with "stunning" digitized images "perfect" animation and a "clever" zoom function. An import preview blurb from VideoGames - The Ultimate Gaming Magazine proclaimed, "The cool graphics of this CD-ROM are something to see." Deniz Ahmet and Gary Lord of Computer and Video Games felt that the game's graphics were its only redeeming quality. While the quartet of writers for the Japanese Weekly Famitsu mostly appreciated the game's visuals, one contributor thought the pre-rendered sprites were awkward.

Some reviewers were highly disappointed in the gameplay mechanics of Ultraman Powered, particularly a perceived lack of speed and poor controls. The staff of Next Generation summarized, "It's fun in a goofy sort of way, but the action is way too slow for serious fighting game addicts." Wynne similarly found the game contained "slow responses to your commands and rather lethargic leaps and bounds across the screen" and described the enemies as "barely animated, shuffling lumps, that simply cannot whip about the screen at the rate required for a truly exciting beat-'em-up." Ação Games proclaimed the slow gameplay to be its only flaw. EGM2 writer Mike Vallas denoted the controls as "absolutely horrendous" and deemed them too difficult to even make the characters leap forward. The German monthly MAN!AC assumed the game would likely appeal to Japanese players familiar with Ultraman, but that its "silly" fights featuring "modest" controls and "incredibly stupid" characters would be difficult to recommend to European players aside from collectors of obscure media. GameFan editor Dave Halverson was much more positive, stating the game's control was "excellent", that it successfully utilized all five buttons on the control pad, and that it featured special attacks similar to those from Ultraman installments on the Super Famicom as well as other fighting games popular at the time. Marcelo Kamikaze of the Brazilian magazine Super GamePower also praised the game overall, admitting that the controls occasionally failed but stating that experiencing this 3DO entry would easily make a player a fan of the Ultraman franchise.
