= Motomu Toriyama =

Japanese game director (born 1971)

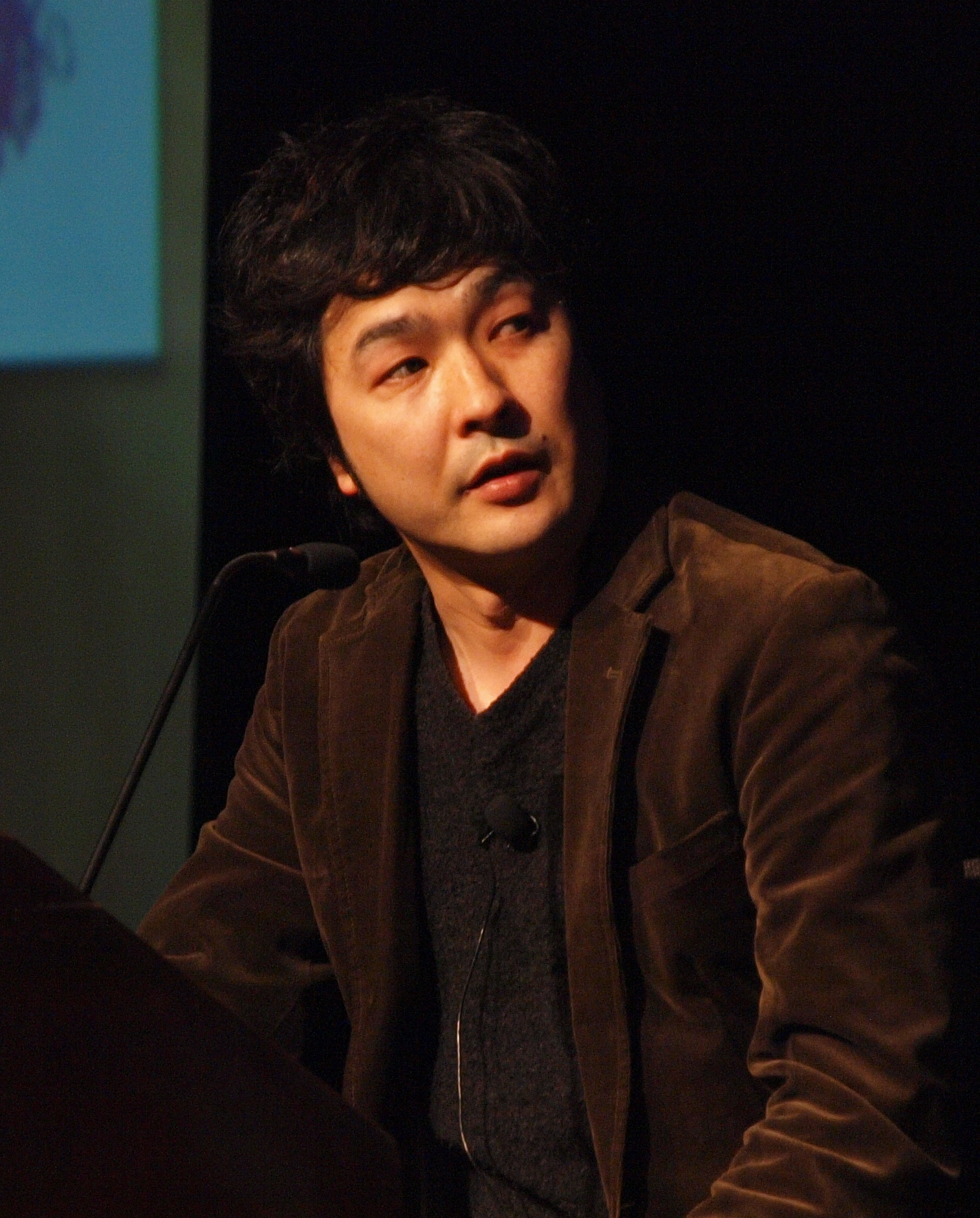
- Toriyama in 2010
- Born: February 9, 1971 (age 55); Japan
- Occupations: Director, scenario writer, deputy studio head
- Years active: 1994–present
- Employer: Square Enix

Motomu Toriyama (鳥山 求, Toriyama Motomu; born February 9, 1971) is a Japanese game director and scenario writer who has been working for Square Enix since 1994. He initially worked on cutscenes in Bahamut Lagoon and Final Fantasy VII before serving as one of the three directors on Final Fantasy X under Yoshinori Kitase where he was in charge of cutscenes, music, voice and motion capture.

Toriyama started directing himself with Final Fantasy X-2 and has continued doing so with Final Fantasy XII: Revenant Wings, Blood of Bahamut, Final Fantasy XIII, Final Fantasy XIII-2, Lightning Returns: Final Fantasy XIII, Mobius Final Fantasy and Final Fantasy VII: Ever Crisis.

Currently he is serving as deputy head of Square Enix's Creative Studio 2 and is working as co-director on the Final Fantasy VII Remake series.

== Biography ==
Toriyama joined Square around the time of the Final Fantasy VI launch in 1994. He later mentioned that he enjoyed how everyone on the development team had the opportunity to contribute their ideas without any solid job description. He was assigned to work on Bahamut Lagoon as his first project due to his lack of game development experience. For Final Fantasy VII, Toriyama designed events such as the ones taking place at the Honey Bee Inn. As the designers were given much artistic freedom, he would often create cutscenes that were unlikely to be approved and thus were eventually changed or removed. Toriyama also wrote and directed many of the scenes revolving around Aerith Gainsborough and Cloud Strife. He tried to make Aerith an important character to the player in order to maximize the impact of her death later in the plot.

After the merger between Square and Enix in 2003, many rookie staff members had to be trained and there were more new platforms to develop for with the release of the Nintendo DS and PlayStation Portable. Toriyama decided to assemble and direct a team of scenario writers and joined various game projects. He later collaborated with Final Fantasy X main programmer Koji Sugimoto and supervisor Yoshinori Kitase to create a Final Fantasy VII tech demo for the PlayStation 3. Development of this took around 6 weeks. During the first year after the development start of Final Fantasy XIII in April 2004, Toriyama thought up a story premised on the Fabula Nova Crystallis mythology created by Kazushige Nojima. In March 2006, when the structural part of the narrative started to come together and lead scenario writer Daisuke Watanabe joined the team, Toriyama showed him a rough outline of what he had written and asked him to flesh out the story and to correct how everything would connect.

Toriyama has been the scenario director and supervisor on games in the Final Fantasy Crystal Chronicles series as well as Dissidia: Final Fantasy and The 3rd Birthday, which entailed the creation of a story concept and the supervision of the character conception and scenario writing by his team of authors. For Lightning Returns, he added an online communication system known as the "Outerworld Services". Among others, it enabled players to write posts on social networks that would then appear as a non-playable character's comment in another player's game. Toriyama's goal with this was to create an online community where the individual members would interact and enjoy the game's world together without being online at the same time, as a precursor to online features found in eight-generation video game consoles. The main ideas for all the areas in Lightning Returns came from him as well.

He was an inaugural member of the Square Enix committee tasked with keeping the Final Fantasy series consistent.

Toriyama has been in charge of the music for all of the games he's directed since Final Fantasy X. He also writes lyrics and song titles.

Toriyama was also in charge of motion capture and voice recordings on Final Fantasy X.

He has a wife and at least one daughter.

== Game design ==
Toriyama believes his strength is in directing games that are very story-driven. He also thinks that it becomes very difficult to tell a compelling story when the player is given a huge amount of freedom to explore. According to him, the most important aspect of a Final Fantasy game is the characters. Toriyama explains that there are different approaches to creating a protagonist: with Yuna from Final Fantasy X, the general plot had already been set when the character was conceived; with Lightning from Final Fantasy XIII instead, the character's personality was decided upon before the backstory was written. He feels that a developer needs to "essentially fall in love at first sight with a character" to "keep [themselves] going". Toriyama considers the voice the "main image of the character" and thus "the most delicate part of making the character".

Toriyama has stated that the aim of the linear game design used in the first half of Final Fantasy XIII was to feel like watching a film. This was done to absorb the player into the story and to introduce them to the characters and their battle abilities without becoming distracted or lost. Toriyama explained that the amount of memory and processing power needed to produce impressive graphics was the main reason not to have a seamless battle system for Final Fantasy XIII. He is interested in using first-person shooter games for inspiration rather than Western role-playing video games, as he believes they give a better sense of tension during battles. Toriyama would later use games such as Red Dead Redemption and The Elder Scrolls V: Skyrim as inspirations for Final Fantasy XIII-2 and Lightning Returns: Final Fantasy XIII, respectively. He feels that his role of director marked a shift from creating a game world based on his own vision to unifying a team's ideas into a cohesive whole.

== Works ==
=== Video games ===
Year	Title	Credit(s)	Ref.
1996	Bahamut Lagoon	Story event planner	
1997	Final Fantasy VII	Event planner, submarine chase section planner	
1999	Racing Lagoon	Scenario writer, event planner, map planner	
2001	Final Fantasy X	Event director, scenario writer, music director, voice and motion capture director	
2003	Final Fantasy X-2	Director, scenario, music director	
2006	Dragon Quest & Final Fantasy in Itadaki Street Portable	Message (text writing)	
2007	Final Fantasy XII: Revenant Wings	Director, scenario writer, event director, music director	
2007	Itadaki Street DS	Text writing	
2008	Final Fantasy Crystal Chronicles: My Life as a King	Scenario writer	
2008	Dissidia: Final Fantasy	Scenario supervisor	
2009	El Ark	Scenario draft	
2009	Final Fantasy Crystal Chronicles: My Life as a Darklord	Scenario director	
2009	Blood of Bahamut	Director, scenario writer, music director	
2009	Fullmetal Alchemist: Prince of the Dawn	Scenario director	
2009	Fullmetal Alchemist: Daughter of the Dusk	Scenario director	
2009	Final Fantasy XIII	Director, scenario designer, music director, lyricist	
2010	Front Mission Evolved	Senior scriptwriter	
2010	The 3rd Birthday	Scenario director	
2011	Imaginary Range	Supervisor	
2011	Fortune Street Wii	Text writing	
2011	Final Fantasy XIII-2	Director, music director, lyricist	
2012	Imaginary Range Ep.2	Supervisor	
2013	Final Fantasy XIV: A Realm Reborn	Scenario writer (Lightning Strikes event)	
2013	Lightning Returns: Final Fantasy XIII	Director, music director, lyricist	
2013	Final Fantasy X/X-2 HD Remaster	Supervisor	
2014	Spirit Yankee Soul	Scenario director (Racing Lagoon event)	
2015	Mobius Final Fantasy	Director, music director, lyricist	
2017	Itadaki Street: Dragon Quest and Final Fantasy 30th Anniversary	Scenario supervisor	
2020	Final Fantasy VII Remake	Co-director, scenario designer, music director, lyrics, song titles	
2021	Final Fantasy VII: The First Soldier	Supervisory support	
2023	Final Fantasy VII: Ever Crisis	Director	
2024	Final Fantasy VII Rebirth	Co-director, scenario, music director, lyrics, song titles	
2026	Octopath Traveler: Champions of the Continent	Scenario supervisor (Final Fantasy X event)	
2026	Final Fantasy XIV: Dawntrail (Patch 7.56)	Guest creator (Keybound Brawler)	
2027	Final Fantasy XIV: Evercold	Story writer (Beyond The Lifestream)	
2027	Final Fantasy VII Revelation	Co-director, scenario, music director	

=== Other projects ===
Year	Title	Credit(s)	Ref.
2005	Final Fantasy VII Technical Demo for PS3	Director	
2009	Final Fantasy XIII Episode Zero: Promise	Original concept	
2010	Final Fantasy XIII Episode Zero: Promise Fabula Nova Dramatica Alpha	Original concept	
2010	Final Fantasy XIII Side Story: A Dreaming Cocoon Falls into the Dawn	Original concept	
2010	Final Fantasy XIII Episode Zero: Promise Fabula Nova Dramatica Omega	Original concept	
2010	Final Fantasy XIII: Episode i	Original concept	
2011	Final Fantasy XIII-2 Fragments Before	Original concept	
2012	Final Fantasy XIII-2 Fragments After	Original concept	
2013	Lightning Returns: Final Fantasy XIII Chronicle of a Chaotic Era^{[A]}	Original concept	
2014	Final Fantasy XIII: Reminiscence -tracer of memories-	Original concept	
2023	Final Fantasy X kabuki play	Supervisor	
2025	Magic: The Gathering - Final Fantasy	Supervisor	

=== Additional credits ===
Year	Title	Credit(s)
2007	The World Ends with You	Special thanks
2009	Kingdom Hearts 358/2 Days	Special thanks
2011	Dissidia 012 Final Fantasy	Special thanks
2015	Dissidia Final Fantasy (2015 video game)	Special thanks
2016	Kingsglaive: Final Fantasy XV	Special thanks
2017	Final Fantasy XIV: Heavensward (Patch 3.56)	Special thanks
2017	Final Fantasy XIV: Stormblood	Special thanks
2018	Dissidia Final Fantasy NT	Special thanks
2018	Final Fantasy Brave Exvius	Special thanks
2019	War of the Visions: Final Fantasy Brave Exvius	Special thanks
2022	Crisis Core: Final Fantasy VII Reunion	Final Fantasy VII Remake team: Co-director, scenario design
2023	Theatrhythm Final Bar Line	Special thanks
2024	Romancing SaGa 2: Revenge of the Seven	Deputy head of studio
2025	SaGa Frontier 2 Remastered	Deputy head of studio
2026	Final Fantasy Resonance	Special thanks

== Notes ==
- ^{A} The novel was cancelled due to the author falling ill, however material from it would be included in Final Fantasy XIII: Reminiscence -tracer of memories-.
