= Lightning Returns: Final Fantasy XIII =

2013 video game

- Developer: Square Enix 1st Production Department (Note: Additional work by tri-Ace and Tose; ported to Windows 10 by Virtuos.)
- Publisher: Square Enix
- Director: Motomu Toriyama
- Producer: Yoshinori Kitase
- Designer: Yuji Abe
- Programmer: Naoki Hamaguchi
- Artist: Isamu Kamikokuryo
- Writer: Daisuke Watanabe
- Composers: Naoshi Mizuta; Mitsuto Suzuki; Masashi Hamauzu
- Series: Fabula Nova Crystallis; Final Fantasy
- Engine: Crystal Tools
- Platforms: PlayStation 3; Xbox 360; Windows
- Release: PlayStation 3, Xbox 360; JP: November 21, 2013; NA: February 11, 2014; AU: February 13, 2014; EU: February 14, 2014; Windows; WW: December 10, 2015
- Genre: Action role-playing
- Mode: Single-player

Lightning Returns: Final Fantasy XIII (Note: Japanese: ライトニング リターンズ ファイナルファンタジーXIII, Hepburn: Raitoningu Ritānzu: Fainaru Fantajī Sātīn) is a 2013 action role-playing game developed and published by Square Enix. A sequel to Final Fantasy XIII-2, it concludes the storyline of Final Fantasy XIII and forms part of the Fabula Nova Crystallis subseries. It was released in 2013 in Japan and 2014 in North America and the PAL regions. It was ported to Windows in 2015 and Android and iOS via cloud gaming in 2016 in Japan. Lightning Returns employs a highly revamped version of the gameplay system from the previous two games, with an action-oriented battle system, the ability to customize the player character's outfits, and a time limit the player must extend by completing story missions and side quests.

The game takes place five hundred years after the previous game's ending. Lightning, the main protagonist of the first game and a key character in the second, awakes from a self-imposed hibernation thirteen days before the world's end. The deity Bhunivelze chooses her to save the people of the dying world, including former friends and allies who have developed heavy emotional burdens. As she travels, she learns the truth behind the world's fate and Bhunivelze's true agenda.

The game's development began in May 2012, shortly after the release of the last DLC for XIII-2, and it was revealed in September of that year as part of the Final Fantasy 25th Anniversary Event. The key creative minds and developers from the preceding games returned, and Square Enix's First Production Department created it, with tri-Ace assisting with graphics development. The development team wanted the game to conclude the story of Lightning and the XIII universe, as well as address criticisms leveled at the previous two games.

The game sold 277,000 units in its first week of release in Japan and went on to become the 17th best-selling game of the year, selling over 400,000 copies by the end of 2013. As of May 2014, 800,000 copies have been sold. Critics have given the game mixed reviews: while they mainly praised the game's battle system, opinions on the graphics, time limit, and other aspects of gameplay were varied, and the story and characters were criticized for being weak or poorly developed.

== Gameplay ==
The player controls Lightning through a third-person perspective to interact with people, objects, and enemies throughout the game. The player can also rotate the camera around the character, allowing a 360° view of the surroundings. The world of Lightning Returns, as with Final Fantasy XIII and its sequel XIII-2, is rendered to scale with the character who navigates the world on foot. In one area, the player can use chocobos, a recurring animal in the Final Fantasy series. The player can freely navigate the game's open-world layout, explore towns and country areas, and accept quests from various non-playable characters (NPCs). Lightning can also sprint for limited periods, climb up ladders, and jump freely. The game features three difficulty levels: Easy, Normal, and Hard, the latter of which is unlocked after completing the game. There is also a New Game+ option, which allows players to begin a new game while carrying over their equipment and stats from a previous playthrough. The in-game clock runs continuously during normal navigation, with one in-game day equating to two to three hours in real time on Easy mode and one hour on Normal and Hard modes. The timer starts at seven in-game days but can be extended to thirteen days. The timer stops during cutscenes, conversations, and battles. Lightning can also pause time using an ability called Chronostasis.

Lightning's growth correlates with her quests; her stats are boosted, with the main story quests yielding the biggest boosts. Many side quests are only available at specific times because of the world's real-time structure, which means NPCs are constantly moving and only appear in certain places at a given time. Lightning can also accept quests from the Canvas of Prayers, a post board found in all the main locations. Completing NPC quests rewards Lightning with a portion of Eradia, spiritual energy retrieved when a person's burden is lifted. Every day at 6 A.M. game-time, Lightning is drawn back into the Ark, a location where the in-game clock does not progress. There, Lightning gives her gathered Eradia to a tree called Yggdrasil; if she has enough, the in-game clock is extended by one day. She can also restock on supplies and collect new equipment. Another feature in the game was Outerworld Services, where the players could take photos and share them, along with their personal stats and battle scores, on Facebook and Twitter. The Facebook features were disabled in April 2015. All Outerworld services were terminated in April the following year.

=== Battle system ===
The Lightning Returns: Final Fantasy XIII battle system, with the ATB meters for Lightning's garb, the available abilities of the current garb, and the EP visible. The enemy's health and stagger meter are visible above it.

The battle system, called the Style-Change Active Time Battle system, incorporates elements from the first and second XIII games' Active Time Battle (ATB)-based Paradigm systems, and bears similarities to the dressphere system featured in Final Fantasy X-2. Lightning has access to several customizable outfits (garb) with different power sets (plural: schemata; singular: schema). Each garb has its own ATB gauge, and its actions map to the controller's face buttons, eliminating the need for the usual menu-style ATB battle system; this allows Lightning to have limited movement whilst engaged in battle. Most of the garbs and their accessories are either purchasable in the in-game shops or received upon completing quests. Stronger garbs, items, shields and weapons are unlocked in Hard Mode, along with access to more challenging areas and boss battles. Lightning can directly equip three schemata, with additional slots for backup schemata that can be equipped outside battle. She can be equipped with a close-combat weapon (such as a sword and a spear), a shield, and a cosmetic accessory. Each garb's color scheme can be customized using both pre-set and custom colors, with the option to alter both specific and all portions of the schema.

As in the previous game, enemies appear in the open field and can be avoided or engaged. The number of enemies increases at night, as do their strength and ability to deal damage as the game progresses. After defeating all the standard versions of an enemy, the final version appears as a boss. Defeating it yields a high reward and the extinction of the enemy type in a specific area of the game. When Lightning attacks an enemy, or they attack her, the battle begins. If Lightning strikes a monster, they lose a small portion of their health, but if the enemy strikes Lightning first, she loses health. Lightning's ATB meter depletes as she attacks, requiring her to switch to another assigned garb; the depleted garb's meter recharges while not in use. Lightning uses her many swords for short-range melee attacks and magic for long-range ones. She can block and evade enemy attacks with her shield, which can be assigned to any garb. Each enemy has a stagger meter, indicated by a line behind their health bar.

As Lightning lands attacks, certain magical or physical blows to the enemy cause their meter to oscillate more. Eventually, the enemy becomes staggered, leaving them vulnerable to damaging attacks. Lightning can also use Energy Points to perform special moves or activate abilities, such as Overclock (which slows time for her opponents and allows her to land more hits) and Army of One, her signature move. Lightning earns gil, the in-game currency, and replenishes a portion of her Energy Point gauge for winning battles. In Normal and Hard modes, Lightning loses one in-game hour if she flees or dies in battle. Unlike the last two games, the player character does not automatically recover health after battles, instead needing to use remedies bought from merchants and shops, and there is no auto-battle mode, with Lightning needing to be controlled manually at all times. In Easy Mode, Lightning regenerates health when she stands idle.

== Synopsis ==
=== Setting ===
Lightning Returns is set after the events of Final Fantasy XIII and Final Fantasy XIII-2. In XIII, Lightning is one of six people who are turned by a fal'Cie—one of a race created by the gods—into l'Cie, servants of the fal'Cie gifted with magical powers and a 'Focus', an assigned task to be completed within a time limit; those who succeed in their Focus enter crystal stasis, while those that fail turn into monsters called Cie'th. The six were intended to cause the large, floating sphere named Cocoon to fall onto the world of Gran Pulse below, killing all the humans of Cocoon. At the finale of the game, two of the l'Cie transformed into a crystal pillar to support Cocoon, preventing the catastrophe. The remaining l'Cie were made human again by the Goddess Etro, the deity responsible for maintaining the balance between the mortal world and the Unseen Realm. In XIII-2, it is revealed that Etro's interference allowed Chaos, an energy trapped in the Unseen Realm, to escape and distort the timeline as written after the fall of Cocoon. Lightning was drawn to Valhalla, Etro's citadel, and decided to stay and act as her protector. Three years after Cocoon's fall, Lightning's sister Serah sets out to correct the timeline distortions and reunite with Lightning, while the people of Gran Pulse construct a new Cocoon, since the old one is destined to collapse. The protagonists unwittingly end up instigating the death of Etro, which allows Chaos to spill into the mortal world and bring an end to time itself. Serah also dies, causing Lightning to nearly lose hope. Reassured by her sister's spirit, Lightning chooses to enter crystal stasis to preserve her sister's memory and keep hope alive.

Lightning Returns is set five hundred years after the ending of XIII-2, during the world's final thirteen days of existence. Because of the unleashing of Chaos, the world of Gran Pulse has been consumed, leaving only a set of islands called Nova Chrysalia. The new Cocoon, named "Bhunivelze" after the key deity in the XIII universe, acts as the world's moon. The Chaos has stopped human aging and no new children are born as a result of Etro's death, causing the human population to stagnate and shrink. Over the intervening centuries, two opposing religions have formed and dominate the lives of Nova Chrysalia's people: the Order of Salvation, that worships Bhunivelze, and the Children of Etro, a rebel cult who worship the Goddess. The world is divided into four regions, each characterized by a specific mood and environment. The city of Luxerion is a capital of worship whose people are loyal to the Order. The pleasure capital of Yusnaan is a city of revelry where people live in a constant state of celebration. The Dead Dunes is a desert area dominated by ruins. The Wildlands is an untamed area where the human city of Academia once stood, as well as the remains of Etro's capital, Valhalla. Within the New Cocoon is the Ark, a zone where time is frozen.

=== Characters ===
Lightning, a central character from both XIII and XIII-2, is the game's main protagonist, sole playable character, and narrator. The other main characters from the previous games also make appearances: Hope Estheim aids Lightning using a wireless communicator; Snow Villiers, devastated by the death of Serah Farron—his fiancée and Lightning's sister—becomes the leader of Yusnaan and the world's last l'Cie; Oerba Dia Vanille and Oerba Yun Fang, released from crystal stasis, go separate ways, with Fang becoming the leader of Monoculus, a bandit gang in the Dead Dunes, and Vanille gaining the power to hear the voices of the dead, thus being deemed a saint and falling under the constant protection of the Order in Luxerion. Noel Kreiss, feeling guilty over his role in the deaths of Etro and Serah and the world's current state, becomes a vigilante in Luxerion. Sazh Katzroy and his son Dajh, who fell into a comatose state, reside in the Wildlands. The region also becomes the home of Mog, the former moogle companion of Noel and Serah from XIII-2; Caius Ballad, Lightning's old adversary and the one responsible for the unleashing of Chaos into the mortal world; and Paddra Nsu-Yeul, a former seeress and pivotal character in the previous game whose cycle of early death and reincarnation was the motivation behind Caius's actions. The game also introduces Lumina, a mysterious near-doppelganger of Serah who both aids and taunts Lightning during her quest; and Bhunivelze, the main deity of the Final Fantasy XIII universe who chooses Lightning as the Savior.

=== Plot ===
Lightning is awoken from crystal stasis by the god Bhunivelze. As the world is set to end in thirteen days, Bhunivelze makes Lightning the Savior, a figure who will free the souls of humanity from emotional burdens and guide them to a new world that Bhunivelze will create. Lightning agrees to commit this task, on the condition that Bhunivelze ensure the rebirth of Serah's spirit. Hope acts as her guide from the Ark, which houses the rescued souls of humanity, having been reverted to his younger self to act as Bhunivelze's servant. As she journeys and performs her task, she encounters her former allies and adversaries, many of whom carry heavy emotional burdens. She is also followed about by Lumina, who both gives her advice and taunts her at regular intervals.

In Luxerion, Lightning investigates serial killings of women matching the description of the Savior; the culprits are the Children of Etro. During her journey, she is followed by Noel, who has become obsessed with a prophecy that he must kill Lightning to reunite with Yeul. The two briefly ally to rout the Children of Etro, then later do battle. Lightning uses Noel's rage to make him realize and accept his mistakes, lifting his burden. Lightning also meets Vanille in the Order's cathedral. Vanille shows Lightning a place within the cathedral where the souls of the dead have gathered. Vanille is being prepared for a ritual to take place on the final day that will apparently purify the souls, hoping to atone for past actions by doing so. In the Dead Dunes, Lightning encounters Fang and goes with her on a journey through the region's dungeons in search of a relic called the Holy Clavis. When they find it, Fang reveals that it is key to the ritual in Luxerion as it has the power to draw in the souls of the dead, and that the ritual will kill Vanille. Fang attempts to destroy the Holy Clavis, but the Order arrive and take it. On the eleventh day, the souls of the dead speak to Lightning through the visage of Cid Raines, a man Lightning encountered during XIII. He tells her that the Order has deceived Vanille into destroying the dead, so the living will forget their existence before their rebirth in the new world. Lightning decides to stop the ritual, though Cid warns her that she will be defying Bhunivelze's will.

In the Wildlands, Lightning rescues a wounded white chocobo called the "Angel of Valhalla" and nurses it back to health. The chocobo is revealed to be Odin, an Eidolon who acted as her ally. She encounters Sazh, whose son Dajh has fallen into a coma and become unwilling to wake because of his father's current state. Lightning retrieves the fragments of Dajh's soul, lifting Sazh's emotional burden and waking his son. Traveling to the ruins of Valhalla, Lightning encounters Caius and multiple versions of Yeul. After fighting with Caius, Lightning learns that he is bound to life by the Yeuls and cannot be saved. She also learns that it was Yeul's perpetual rebirth that caused the Chaos to seep into the mortal world, triggering the events of XIII-2. Encountering Mog as the leader of a moogle village, she helps him fend off attacking monsters. In Yusnaan, Lightning infiltrates Snow's palace and finds him preparing to enter a concentration of Chaos contained inside the palace. He plans to absorb the Chaos, transform into a Cie'th, and have Lightning kill him. Though he performs the act and they fight, Lightning manages to renew his hope of seeing Serah again, reverse his transformation and lift his burden. On Nova Chrysalia's final day, Hope reveals to Lightning that Bhunivelze used him to watch Lightning and that the deity will dispose of him now that his task is completed.

After Hope disappears, Lightning is transported to Luxerion and enters the cathedral, where Noel, Snow and Fang help her fight the Order to save Vanille. Lightning manages to convince her to free the souls of the dead. This act allows Lightning to find Serah's soul, kept safe inside Lumina, but Bhunivelze arrives using Hope as his host and captures everyone but Lightning. Transported to an otherworldly realm, Lightning meets Bhunivelze in person, and learns that he has been conditioning Lightning to replace Etro. After wounding the god in battle, she frees Hope and prepares to become the new Goddess and protect the new world by trapping herself and Bhunivelze in the Unseen Realm. An illusion of Serah then confronts Lightning, revealing Lumina as the physical manifestation of Lightning's suppressed vulnerabilities. Accepting Lumina as a part of herself, Lightning calls for aid. Hope, Snow, Noel, Vanille, Fang and the Eidolons answer her call, severing Bhunivelze's hold on the souls of humanity, including Sazh, Dajh, Mog, and Serah. The souls then unite and defeat Bhunivelze. In the aftermath, Caius and the multiple versions of Yeul remain in the Unseen Realm to protect the balance between worlds in Etro's stead. The final incarnation of Yeul, who wishes to live with Noel, is allowed to accompany Lightning and her friends. After the Eidolons and Mog depart for the Unseen Realm, Lightning, her allies, and the souls of humanity travel to a new world. In a post-credits scene, Lightning is seen going to reunite with one of her friends.

== Development ==
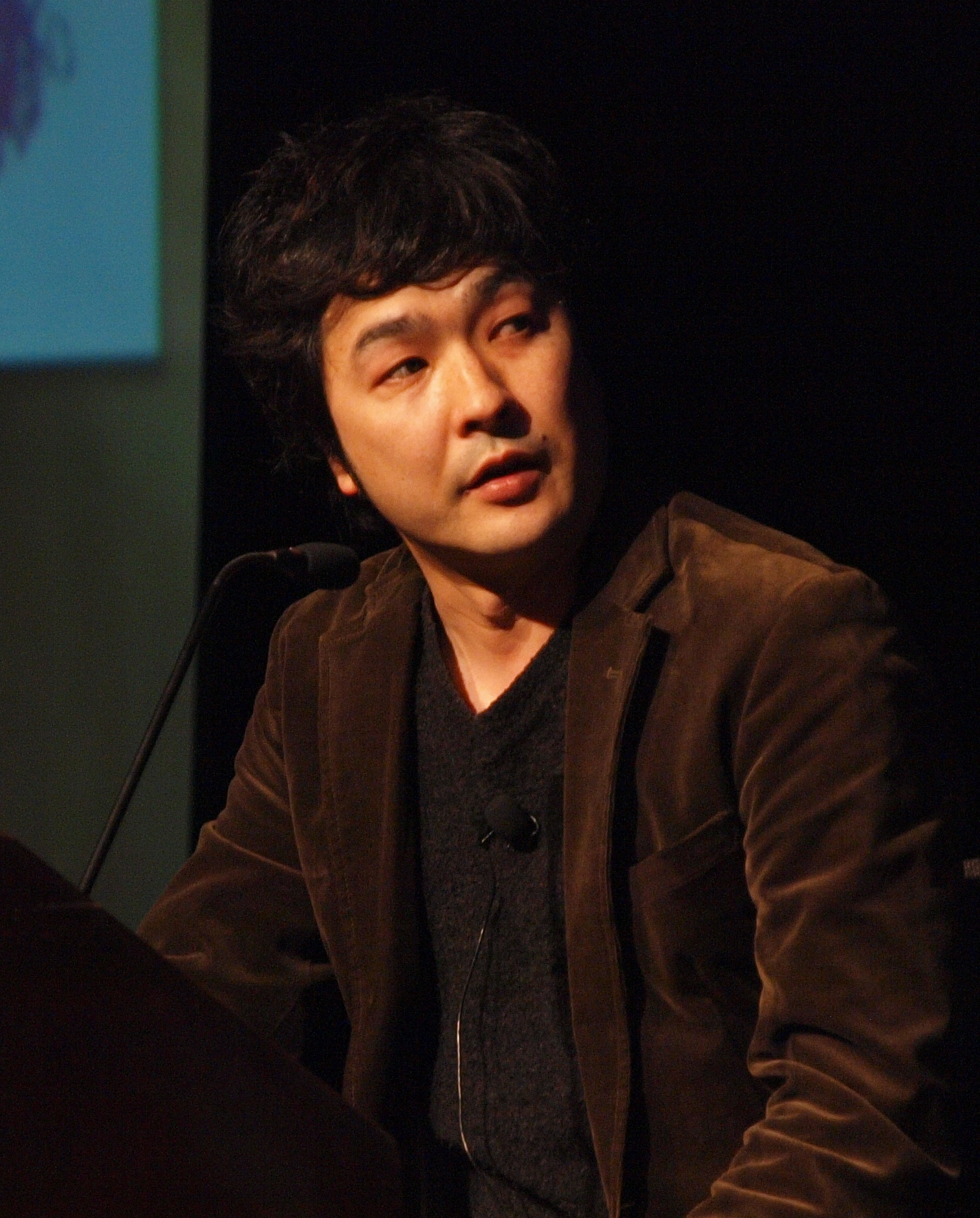
Director Motomu Toriyama at the 2010 Game Developers Conference.

The concept of Lightning Returns originated during development of XIII-2, while the development team was brainstorming ideas for possible continuations of the story and universe of the games, though there was no solid decision to make a second sequel to XIII at the time. Development of Lightning Returns started in May 2012, soon after the release of Requiem of the Goddess, the final story-based DLC episode for XIII-2. According to Motomu Toriyama, he had wanted to tell more stories about Lightning, and the DLC had not provided a satisfactory ending for her. The game was designed in a shorter time than the other games in the series; Yoshinori Kitase explained that this was because the team did not want players to forget the story of the previous games, and the team needed to work especially hard as a result. Another reason was that the team wished to bring the XIII series to a close before the release of the next generation of gaming hardware. The title was also chosen to be the last original Final Fantasy game on seventh generation consoles, and next-gen versions of the game were not considered. Developer tri-Ace, who had previously worked with the team on XIII-2, returned to help with the graphics.

One of the key story concepts behind the game was the "rebirth" of Lightning as a character: this was cited as the main reason why the game was called Lightning Returns and not XIII-3, alongside the team's desire to attract new players to the series. Lightning was also made into a darker and more vulnerable character, partly because Kitase felt that her previous stoic depictions might have alienated earlier players. The main scenario and script was written by Daisuke Watanabe, the main writer for the previous XIII games. During the concept process, Watanabe, Toriyama and other members of staff brainstormed ideas for important scenes and events leading up to them. The process of writing the script was slow, causing difficulties for the rest of the team. In response to this, Watanabe worked extra hard to create an appropriate finale for the characters and story. He also wrote the script as more hard-edged than those for the previous XIII games.

The game was designed as the final entry in the XIII storyline (generally dubbed the "Lightning Saga" by the production team), but was also intended to stand independent of the Final Fantasy series as a whole. One example of the breakaway from series norms is the game's logo, which was not designed by regular series logo artist Yoshitaka Amano, and which was one of several created during the early stages of development. The concept of the story's progression was termed as "world-driven", a concept whereby the world the player interacted with moved independently of their actions: i.e. NPCs would appear in different locations depending on the time of day. That concept partially gave rise to the game's time limit, which was suggested by game design director Yuji Abe after having read of the Doomsday Clock. Another inspiration behind the story pacing and time limit was the 2011 film In Time. The open world aspect of the game was heavily influenced by The Elder Scrolls V: Skyrim, and some of the hard-edged gameplay ideas were borrowed from Dark Souls. The majority of the hardcore-gaming elements were eventually trimmed out in order to make the game accessible to newcomers.

In terms of assets, the team reused very little from the previous two games, choosing to build a large proportion of the game from the ground up, especially when it came to the overworld design and NPC behaviors. The Crystal Tools engine, used in the last two XIII games, required a major overhaul as it was not designed for open-world games. In contrast to the previous games, a lot of the game's cutscenes were created while the game was still in development, meaning many placeholder objects and models had to be used until the final assets could be put in place. The team also had to thoroughly check Lightning's various outfits and weapons, to ensure that there were no mistakes in cutscenes with the weapons going through the scenery, and that the character's underwear remained concealed during active battles even for her more revealing outfits. Because the team was mostly using new assets to create the game, the various continents took longer to create than the environments in XIII-2, and story scenes sometimes needed to be redone as the game's overall plot had yet to be finalized when development began. The voice actors, in contrast to the normal procedure doing their performances first and those being used to create the game characters' facial expressions, recorded their lines for the characters well after the various cutscenes had been created.

The concept of Lightning Returns' battle system originated while ideas were being discussed for the battle system in Final Fantasy XIII, but technical limitations and problems implementing it in a party-based battle system prevented it from being used in that game. It reemerged when some of the development team wanted Lightning to change her appearance during battle, and reducing to one playable character opened up the memory space necessary for such a system to be implemented. In making the system revolving around one character, the developers ended up removing any opportunity for story scenes between party members, which was cited by Abe as its main weakness. The time limit sprang from the story concept of a world with a set time to live. When the feature was first announced, there were some who felt it was too new for the game, as a time limit was seen as a taboo in role-playing video games. The mechanic originally received negative feedback from test players who were unable to complete the game in time. In response to this, the team made adjustments so that players were given a more comfortable amount of time. Along with sharing design elements with the previous two XIII games, the system also bears similarities to the battle system of Final Fantasy XV, although the developers said that they were not directly inspired by it.

Lightning's multiple outfits were designed by Isamu Kamikokuryo, the game's art director, Toshitaka Matsuda, the lead art designer, and Toshiyuki Itahana, a designer who had worked on Final Fantasy IX and the Crystal Chronicles series. The three drew inspiration from character designs done by Amano and the atmospheres of game locations. Matsuda and Itahana also respectively did the character designs for Bhunivelze and Lumina. Tetsuya Nomura returned to design Lightning and Snow's new looks. Kamikokuryo used the game's theme of a dying world to create Nova Chrysalia, as well as incorporating cultural and architectural influences from the Middle East, Asia, and London during the Industrial Revolution. Nova Chrysalia was originally conceived as a single island, but as the game's development advanced, the world grew into its final, four-island configuration. The world's open design was inspired by MMORPGs such as Final Fantasy XI, described by Abe as a "tourist guide style". Each island was designed to have a definite feel and theme, while their construction was handled by separate small teams, with the content for each area held and quality-controlled by each team. The art team used multiple real world locations as inspiration: Luxerion and Yusnaan were inspired by Paris and Las Vegas, while the Dead Dunes and Wildlands were influenced by Cairo and Costa Rica. The scenery for the final FMV was based on southern Europe.

=== Music ===
The music of Lightning Returns was composed by Masashi Hamauzu, who composed the music for XIII, Naoshi Mizuta and Mitsuto Suzuki, who co-composed the music for XIII-2 with Hamauzu. Others involved in recording the soundtrack were Japanese band Language and the Video Game Orchestra, founded by Shota Nakama. Multiple tracks used "Blinded by Light", a recurring theme in the XIII games, as a leitmotif. Unlike the previous XIII games, a theme song was not created, with the composers instead creating a purely orchestral piece for the finale. The main soundtrack album, Lightning Returns: Final Fantasy XIII Original Soundtrack, was released on four compact discs on November 21, 2013. A bonus album, Lightning Returns: Final Fantasy XIII Soundtrack Plus, featuring unreleased tracks and rearrangements of classic themes used in the game, was released on March 26, 2014. A promotional album, Lightning Returns: Final Fantasy XIII Pre Soundtrack, was released in July 2013. The game featured multiple musical Easter eggs, including tunes from previous entries in the franchise. The commercial albums respectively reached #29 and #211 on the Oricon charts.

== Marketing ==
Rumors about a second sequel's existence started even before XIII-2's release, when a domain name was registered in the name of Final Fantasy XIII-3, but it turned out that the domain was registered by the company's western branch without the main company's knowledge. After XIII-2's cliffhanger ending became common knowledge, the game's creators released a statement saying that the ending was meant to prepare fans for coming DLC packets that would expand upon the game's story. However, after the release of the last piece of DLC, company officials stated that they would be releasing future content related to XIII. By August 2012, during the run-up to a special 25th Anniversary commemoration event for the Final Fantasy series, a teaser site titled "A Storm Gathers" was released, promising new developments for the XIII series and its main protagonist. The game itself was finally unveiled at the event, with Toriyama, Kamikokuryo, Abe and Kitase detailing the core concepts of the game. Because character dialogue varied due to the time of day in-game, the western release of the game was delayed by over two months after the local release, as there was far more translation, dubbing work and lip-synching than in previous titles. For the promotion and marketing of the game, the development team rethought their strategy. They worked closely with Yohei Murakami, the publicity and marketing agent for many Square Enix games. Lightning Returns was heavily promoted at gaming events throughout 2013. As part of the promotion campaign, Lightning and monsters from the XIII series featured in a series of player events in Final Fantasy XIV: A Realm Reborn.

=== Downloadable content ===
While the previous game had a large amount of downloadable content in the form of character costumes, extra story episodes and battles in the game's fighting arena, the reaction to these was mixed. The costumes were liked by fans, despite some complaints of them being purely cosmetic, but the presence of story DLC caused many to criticize the original game as incomplete. In reaction to this, the developers decided to package the game's entire story with the retail edition, but they did create pre-order DLC for the game in the form of outfits Lightning could use in battle. One of these featured the clothing, weapon and equipment of Cloud Strife from Final Fantasy VII, available with the game's limited edition Pre-Order Bonus Pack, while another featured a collection of Samurai-inspired outfits. In addition to this, as part of a cross-game promotional campaign, Square Enix of Japan also made Yuna's costume from Final Fantasy X a playable garb for those who had purchased the Japanese HD Remaster of the game on either PS3 or Vita. The garb was later made available as a pre-order exclusive from Amazon.com. After the game's release, an additional set of DLC costumes was released, among them a moogle outfit. In the Western release of the game scheduled for February 2014, a free DLC pack was released that enabled players to play the localized version of the game with Japanese voice acting and lip-synching. The DLC was free for the first two weeks, and then became paid DLC.

=== Versions and merchandise ===
Lightning Returns was released on November 21, 2013, in Japan and in February 2014 for other markets. Alongside the standard release, a special box set titled "Lightning Ultimate box" was released. It included Final Fantasy XIII, XIII-2 and Lightning Returns, a figurine of Lightning, selected music from the games, a special stand from the game and a book of artwork. A limited edition of the PlayStation 3 version containing a specially-themed DualShock 3 controller was also released in Asia. A Collector's Edition exclusive to North America was released through Square Enix's online store. It contained a copy of the game, an artwork book, a pocket watch embossed with the game's logo and codes for costume DLC. The game was also ported to Windows platforms via Steam for release in December 2015. It features all DLC outfits apart from the Aerith-themed one, and removes the ability to name chocobos, map markers or schemata. A release on iOS and Android devices via cloud streaming followed on February 17, 2016, in Japan.

As part of the game's promotion in Japan, Square Enix teamed up with Japanese confectionery company Ezaki Glico to market a range of Pocky snacks in packaging promoting the game. A Play Arts Kai figurine of Lightning as she appears in the game was also created by Square Enix. After the game's release, an Ultimania guide to the game was also released, containing concept and character artwork, interviews with staff members, and guides to the game's enemies, continent layouts and times for events. A book set between XIII-2 and Lightning Returns, Chronicle of Chaotic Era, was originally scheduled to be released alongside the game in Japan, but was eventually cancelled due to the author falling ill. After the game's release, a three-part novella set after Lightning Returns' ending was released through Famitsu Weekly magazine, titled Final Fantasy XIII Reminiscence: tracer of memories. Written by Watanabe based on and incorporating the material written for Chronicle of Chaotic Era, the book takes the form of a series of interviews with the main characters of the XIII series.

The game was added to Xbox One backward compatibility along with its predecessors in November 2018. It is also Xbox One X Enhanced, allowing it to display in 4K Ultra HD. In November 2021, support for FPS Boost on Xbox Series X/S was added allowing it to run at 60 frames per second.

== Reception ==
=== Sales ===
In Japan, the PS3 version of Lightning Returns reached the top of the Top 20 in software sales in its first week, selling just over 277,000 units and beating Nintendo's Super Mario 3D World. In the same period, the Xbox 360 version sold 4,000 units, under half of the initial sales of XIII-2 for that platform. By the end of 2013, the PS3 version was 17th among the 100 best-selling titles of the year, selling over 400,000 copies. In the United Kingdom, Lightning Returns debuted at third place in the top ten debut video games. The game was 8th in the top ten best-selling video games of February. By May 2014, the game had sold approximately 800,000 copies worldwide. According to Steam Spy, a further 376,000 copies of the Windows PC version were sold by April 2018. As of September 2014, Final Fantasy XIII series was widely successful and has shipped over 11 million copies worldwide. Final Fantasy series brand manager Shinji Hashimoto revealed in October 2016 that Lightning Returns met sales expectations and that Square Enix is satisfied with it.

=== Reviews ===
Reception

Aggregate score
Aggregator	Score
Metacritic	X360: 69/100; PS3: 66/100; PC: 66/100

Review scores
Publication	Score
Destructoid	7.5/10
Edge	6/10
Eurogamer	8/10
Famitsu	37/40
Game Informer	7/10
GameSpot	5/10
IGN	7/10
PlayStation Official Magazine – UK	6/10

Lightning Returns has received mixed reviews from critics. The game scored 37/40 in Famitsu magazine, with the reviewers giving scores of 10, 10, 9 and 8 out of 10 for each console version of the game. Famitsu later gave the game an "Excellence" award during the 2013 Famitsu Awards. Review aggregator website Metacritic gave the Xbox 360 version 69/100 based on 21 reviews, and the PlayStation 3 version 66/100 based on 62 reviews.

The battle system gained the highest amount of praise. Matt Elliot of Official PlayStation Magazine said the battle system was fun and "[felt] like Final Fantasy: an energetic, modern approximation of combat that was previously turn-based". IGN' Marty Sliva greatly enjoyed the battle system, saying that "Lightning Returns did a great job of empowering me to create a [trio of Schema] that felt unique and personal". Joe Juba of Game Informer was also pleased with the system which he considered to be an improvement over the previous two XIII games, noting that the switching of Schema created "a fast-paced, high-tension system that makes fights exciting". Eurogamer's Simon Parkin called it "perhaps the best and certainly most flexible version yet" when compared to the other XIII games, while GameSpot's Kevin VanOrd stated that if it were not for a few flaws such as the blocking, "it may have even found a place among Final Fantasy's better battle systems". Famitsu generally cited the battle system as "excellent", noting it as fast-paced and fun, but also noting that some enemies were tricky even on Easy mode. It also praised the level of "uniqueness" available in garb customization.

The quest gameplay was less-well received, with Sliva saying it made him "feel like [he] was stuck in the opening hours of an MMO", while Juba called the tasks "dull". Parkin said that the quests "can seem trivial under the eye of the apocalyptic clock". VanOrd commented that while many quests were "absorbing on their own", he admired their ability to get the player out into the world. Destructoid's Dale North felt that the time limit made the quests "a waste of the precious time left". The time limit itself received mixed reviews. Sliva said the time limit gave the game "a sense of urgency ... that I really enjoy", while VanOrd said the limit worked against the player and "collides with almost every other aspect of the game". Juba enjoyed planning out his days, but on the other felt that the time limit prevented exploration, and that it severely limited player's ability to fully dive into some of the systems. Elliot said the limit overly pressured him, and became unpleasant when coupled with the time penalty for fleeing battle. The Famitsu reviewers said that the time limit was not an overly stressful factor.

The graphics received mixed reviews. Sliva referred to the locations as "visually interesting and varied", while VanOrd said the player "can't help but gawk at the beautiful spectacle before [them]". Juba liked the overall look and design of the main cast and environment, but critiqued the environment textures and NPCs. Elliot praised the CG cutscenes, but said that "the tired, boxy side streets feel unfinished". However, he further said that the expansive nature of environments balanced this issue out. The environments were praised by Famitsu, who wrote that due to the expansive nature of the environments and the lack of hints concerning quests, new players might take a bit of time getting used to it. It also generally called the game "quite nice".

The game's story received mixed reviews. Sliva said the narrative was "drenched in uninteresting pathos that failed to give me a reason to care about these characters that I've spent well over 100 hours with". Juba called the story "a joke", saying that there was little development for Lightning as a character, and that the narrative "killed whatever lingering investment [he] had in the universe". VanOrd found the large amount of character dialogue a distracting and jarring feature, while Parkin said that the game's narrative could not fix the issues present in the previous two XIII games, although the side-quests and dialogue helped lighten Lightning's character. Elliot spoke of it as one of the reasons to play the game, terming it a "typically bonkers narrative".

=== Awards ===
The Final Fantasy XIII series won a Sound Division: Award of Excellence at the CEDEC AWARDS 2014 for the sound development team.

Lightning Returns won a Famitsu Excellence Award in April 2014.

=== Official response ===
Both Toriyama and Kitase have responded to the mixed review scores the game received. Speaking to Siliconera about the Japanese reviews, Toriyama said that most of the negativity stemmed from the time limit, and that "opinions on the game become more positive after some time since Lightning Returns' initial release after players get used to the nuances". Speaking with Joystiq, Kitase said that he "wasn't really shocked. There are negative reviews and positive reviews, it's a real mixture. When I started making this game I took on very new challenges, so in a way I had anticipated that there would be mixed opinions, so this is more or less what we had anticipated". Shinji Hashimoto revealed in October 2016 that Lightning Returns met sales expectations and that Square Enix is satisfied with it.
