= Ellegarden Best (1999–2008) =

Greatest hits album by Ellegarden
- Released: July 2, 2008
- Genre: Rock
- Length: 68:10
- Label: Dynamord

Ellegarden chronology
Figureheads Compilation (2007)	Ellegarden Best (1999–2008) (2008)

Professional ratings
Review scores
Source	Rating
AllMusic	4.5/5 stars

Ellegarden Best (1999–2008) is a greatest hits album by the Japanese music group Ellegarden, compiling some of the best songs from their active years. It was released on July 2, 2008.

== Track listing ==
1. My Favorite Song – 3:42
2. Kaze no Hi (風の日, Windy Day) – 4:12
3. Middle of Nowhere – 3:52
4. (Can't Remember) How We Used to Be – 3:16
5. Jitterbug (ジターバグ) – 3:20
6. Kinsei (金星, Venus) – 3:17
7. So Sad – 2:45
8. Supernova – 3:45
9. Starfish (スターフィッシュ) – 3:41
10. Make a Wish – 2:18
11. Pizza Man – 2:09
12. Red Hot – 2:54
13. Niji (虹, Rainbow) – 3:27
14. Marry Me – 2:49
15. Missing – 3:24
16. The Autumn Song – 3:02
17. Fire Cracker – 3:14
18. Space Sonic – 3:23
19. Salamander – 3:41
20. Mr. Feather – 3:37
21. Koukasen (高架線, Elevated) – 2:22

== Track sources ==
Tracks 1–3 originally found on Don't Trust Anyone But Us

Track 4 originally found on My Own Destruction

Tracks 5–7 originally found on Bring Your Board!!

Tracks 8–11 originally found on Pepperoni Quattro

Tracks 12–15 originally found on Riot on the Grill

Track 16 originally found on Figureheads Compilation

Tracks 17–19 and 21 originally found on Eleven Fire Crackers

Track 20 was originally found on the b-side of the single Space Sonic but was also released on the Nano-Mugen Compilation 2008 seven days later.

== Charts ==
Chart (2008)	Peak position
Japanese Albums (Oricon)	2
