= Anomaly (The Hiatus album) =

Studio album by The Hiatus
- Released: June 30, 2010
- Genres: Alternative rock, progressive rock, experimental rock
- Length: 52:31
- Languages: English, Japanese
- Labels: For Life Music; FLCF-4340
- Producers: Takeshi Hosomi, Hirohisa Horie

The Hiatus chronology
Insomnia (2009)	Anomaly (2010)	Hatching Mayflies (2011)

Anomaly is the second full-length album released by The Hiatus on June 30, 2010. It peaked at No. 5 on the Oricon album chart. Tez Humphreys drew the illustration for the record jacket.

== Track listing ==
All lyrics are written by Takeshi hosomi; all music is composed by The Hiatus.

CD
No.	Title	Length
1.	"The Ivy"	4:09
2.	"Talking Reptiles"	2:16
3.	"My Own Worst Enemy"	3:50
4.	"Monkeys"	2:24
5.	"Insomnia" (album version)	3:57
6.	"Beterugiusu no Hi" (ベテルギウスの灯; Betelgeuse's Light)	3:02
7.	"Walking Like a Man"	5:14
8.	"Doom"	1:17
9.	"Antibiotic"	6:06
10.	"Notes of Remembrance"	4:06
11.	"Saimon no Maisō" (西門の昧爽; The dawn of the west gate)	2:12

== Recording members ==
- Takeshi Hosomi: vocal, guitar
- masasucks: guitar
- Koji Ueno: bass guitar
- Takashi Kashikura: drums
- Masakazu Ichise: drums, percussions (track 9)
- Hirohisa Horie: electronic keyboard, synthesizer
- Ichiyo Izawa: piano (track 9)
- Seigen Tokuzawa: string instruments (track 5)
