= A World of Pandemonium =

Studio album by The Hiatus
- Released: November 23, 2011
- Genres: Alternative rock, experimental rock, progressive rock
- Length: 38:59
- Language: English
- Labels: For Life Music; FLCF-4406
- Producers: Takeshi Hosomi, Hirohisa Horie

The Hiatus chronology
Hatching Mayflies (2011)	A World of Pandemonium (2011)	Horse Riding (2013)

A World of Pandemonium is the third full-length album released by The Hiatus on November 23, 2011. It reached No. 6 on the Oricon album chart.

== Track listing ==
All lyrics are written by Takeshi Hosomi; all music is composed by The Hiatus

CD
No.	Title	Length
1.	"Deerhounds"	4:30
2.	"Superblock"	3:34
3.	"The Tower and The Snake"	3:23
4.	"Souls" (feat. Jamie Blake)	4:29
5.	"Bittersweet/Hatching Mayflies"	4:27
6.	"Broccoli"	2:07
7.	"Flyleaf"	4:35
8.	"Shimmer"	4:28
9.	"Snowflakes"	3:45
10.	"On Your Way Home"	3:39
