= Trash We'd Love =

Studio album by The Hiatus
- Released: June 27, 2009
- Genre: Alternative rock, progressive rock, experimental rock
- Length: 38:40
- Language: English, Japanese
- Label: For Life Music; FLCF-4281
- Producer: Takeshi Hosomi, Hirohisa Horie

The Hiatus chronology
Trash We'd Love (2009)	Insomnia (2009)

Trash We'd Love is the first full-length album released by The Hiatus on June 27, 2009. It reached No. 1 on the Oricon album chart. The cover was designed by Kaori Maki.

== Track listing ==
All lyrics are written by Takeshi Hosomi; all music is composed by Takeshi Hosomi, except No.2 and 11 (by Takeshi Hosomi & masasucks)

CD
No.	Title	Length
1.	"Ghost in the Rain"	3:39
2.	"Lone Train Running"	3:13
3.	"Centipede"	3:12
4.	"Silver Birch"	3:16
5.	"Daten (堕天; Fallen)"	3:30
6.	"Storm Racers"	3:02
7.	"Little Odyssey"	4:14
8.	"The Flare"	4:05
9.	"Konpeki no Yoru ni (紺碧の夜に; On a Deep Blue Evening)"	3:03
10.	"Yunikōn (ユニコーン; Unicorn)"	2:31
11.	"Twisted Maple Trees"	4:55
