= Music of Final Fantasy XIII =

Music from the video game Final Fantasy XIII

The music of the video game Final Fantasy XIII was composed by Masashi Hamauzu. Former regular series composer Nobuo Uematsu did not contribute any pieces to the soundtrack. Music from the game has been released in several albums. The main soundtrack album, Final Fantasy XIII Original Soundtrack, was released on four Compact Discs in 2010 by Square Enix, the developers and producers of the game. Selections from the soundtrack have been released on two gramophone record albums, W/F: Music from Final Fantasy XIII and W/F: Music from Final Fantasy XIII Gentle Reveries, both in 2010 by Square Enix. An album of arranged pieces from the soundtrack, Final Fantasy XIII Original Soundtrack -PLUS-, was also released by Square Enix in 2010, as was an album of piano arrangements, Piano Collection Final Fantasy XIII. The theme song for the Japanese version of the game, "Kimi ga Iru Kara" (君がいるから, "Because You're Here"), was released as a single by For Life Music in 2009.

The soundtrack received positive reviews from critics, who felt that it was Hamauzu's best work to date and an excellent mix of material and genres which took the series' music in a new direction. The "Plus" album received weaker reviews, primarily due to its perceived lack of tracks that were significantly different from those in the original soundtrack album, while "Kimi ga Iru Kara" was considered bland and disappointing. The "Piano" album's reception was split between critics who felt that the tracks did not deviate enough from the original pieces and those who felt that the straightforward arrangements were sophisticated. Music from the game was played at a live orchestral concert in Stockholm, Sweden, and was added to the permanent rotation of the international Distant Worlds concert series, while tracks from the piano album have been played in concerts in Japan and Paris.

== Creation and influence ==
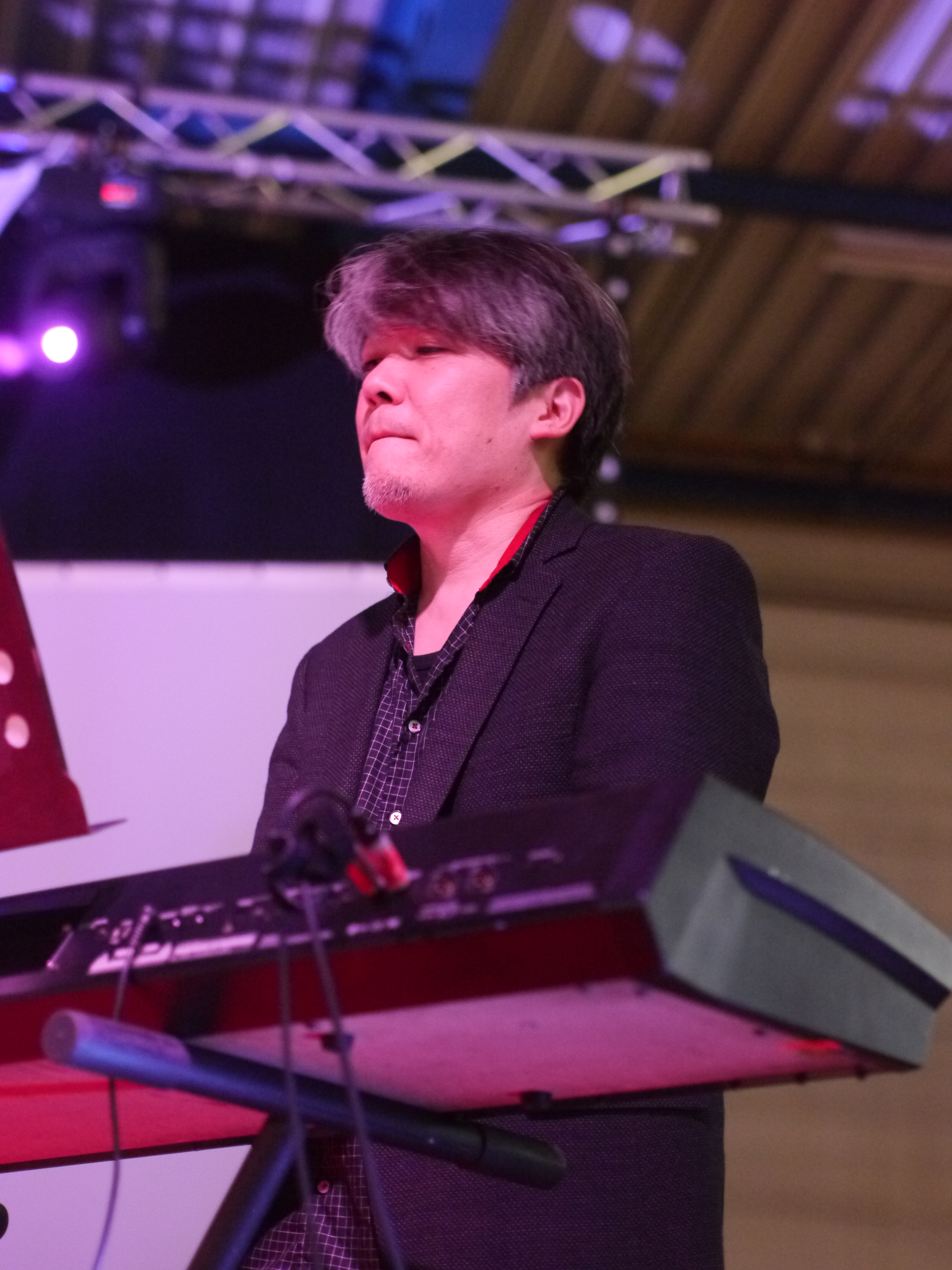
Composer Masashi Hamauzu in 2012

Masashi Hamauzu composed the game's soundtrack. His previous work on the series was as a co-composer for Final Fantasy X and as the main composer for Dirge of Cerberus: Final Fantasy VII. The game was the first main-series Final Fantasy game not to include any compositions by original series composer Nobuo Uematsu; although he was originally announced to compose the main theme of the game, this role was taken over by Hamauzu after Uematsu signed on to compose the soundtrack for Final Fantasy XIV. Game producer Yoshinori Kitase chose Hamauzu because he felt that Hamauzu would be the best for the job as he was composing an orchestral-based soundtrack then for Dirge of Cerberus and the Final Fantasy XIII team wanted that style for the game. Hamauzu described the soundtrack in the liner notes for the soundtrack album as comprising multiple genres of music so that the player would not get tired of it, while also using several motifs so as to tie the varying pieces together; particularly in grouping the themes from the Cocoon and Pulse areas in the game. He tried to match each piece and theme to his sense of the narrative and characters involved in the scenes that they would be played in, and feels that being the sole composer for the project allowed him to ensure that the overall direction of the soundtrack was consistent.

Besides some pieces he did for promotional events in 2006 and 2007, Hamauzu began composing the soundtrack in Autumn 2008 and finished it around one year later. When he began the bulk of the composition, he started by composing the motifs he wanted to use, rather than any particular piece. The first track that he composed was "Blinded by Light", as one of the promotional pieces; it was based on the director Motomu Toriyama's vision of the game as a mixture of fantasy and near-future, as the storyline for the game had not yet been finalized. As the game was intended to be a conscious departure from the staples of previous Final Fantasy games, Hamauzu was not constrained in keeping the music in line with previous soundtracks from the series. Despite this, he did not compose the music specifically to "break from the series' past", but rather focused it on the game as it was presented.

The score also features some recordings by the Warsaw Philharmonic Orchestra, arranged by Yoshihisa Hirano, Toshiyuki Oomori and Kunihito Shiina. Hamauzu had previously worked with the orchestra on his album Vielen Dank, released in 2007. Four songs in the soundtrack include vocals by Mina Sakai, an artist whom Hamauzu works as a producer for. Two of the songs are in English rather than Japanese, and "The Gapra Whitewood" was intended to be as well, but during practice Sakai and Hamauzu changed it to use a fictitious language as they felt her focus on pronouncing the English words was detracting from the melody. The two English tracks were re-recorded for the English version of the game, as the localization team felt that they did not sound natural to native speakers. On three of the pieces from the soundtrack: "Sazh's Theme", "Daddy's Got the Blues", and "Can't Catch a Break", described as jazzy pieces related to the character Sazh, Hamauzu's compositions were arranged by Toru Tabei, a friend of his, who Hamauzu describes as being more familiar with that style of music. Several tracks in the game were arranged by colleagues Junya Nakano, Mitsuto Suzuki, and Ryo Yamazaki. Hamauzu gave the arrangers creative freedom to add and replace elements as they pleased, although Suzuki has since stated that as he has gained more experience he regrets some of the changes he made.

The theme song for the international version of the game is "My Hands", from British singer Leona Lewis' second album Echo; it was chosen to replace Final Fantasy XIII's original theme song from the Japanese version, "Kimi ga Iru Kara" (君がいるから, "Because You're Here") by Sayuri Sugawara. Square Enix President Yoichi Wada has stated that it would have been better if the American branch of the company had produced a theme song from scratch, but the lack of staff led to the decision of licensing an existing song instead. Hamauzu, who composed the music for "Kimi ga Iru Kara", only met Sugawara once, and was not involved in producing the vocal song. He was not involved in the decision to use "My Hands" for the international version.

== Soundtrack ==
Final Fantasy XIII Original Soundtrack

Soundtrack album by Masashi Hamauzu
- Released: January 27, 2010
- Genre: Video game soundtrack
- Length: Disk 1: 49:27; Disk 2: 55:50; Disk 3: 1:03:28; Disk 4: 1:15:21
- Label: Square Enix

Final Fantasy XIII Original Soundtrack is the soundtrack album of Final Fantasy XIII, containing all of the musical tracks from the game, and was composed and produced by Masashi Hamauzu. The soundtrack spans four discs and 85 tracks, covering a duration of 4:04:06. It was released on January 27, 2010 in Japan by Square Enix, bearing the catalog numbers SQEX-10183~6. The limited edition of the soundtrack included a bonus disc containing a radio drama written by novelist Jun Eishima. The radio drama does not include any music not already in the album. The album sold 16,000 copies the day of its release. It reached #3 on the Japanese Oricon charts, and remained on the charts for nine weeks. The soundtrack incorporates both orchestral and electronic music, sometimes within the same track. Almost two dozen of the tracks include vocal performances to some degree, the most of any Final Fantasy soundtrack to date. It does not include many of the mainstay tracks from previous games in the series such as Uematsu's "Prelude" and "Main Theme", and its variation on his "Chocobo", the only repeat track, is so different as to not credit him as the original composer in the album.

In addition to the full soundtrack CD release, two vinyl record albums have been released by Square Enix in 2010, each including a selection of pieces from the full soundtrack. The first of these, W/F: Music from Final Fantasy XIII, was released on February 26, while the second, W/F： Music from Final Fantasy XIII Gentle Reveries, was released on June 30. W/F: Music from Final Fantasy XIII is the first vinyl record that Square Enix has ever released. Each album contains eight tracks, four per side. The first album has a total length of 32:06 and a catalog number of SE-M0001, while the second has the catalog number SE-M0002.

The album received good reviews from critics. Patrick Gann of RPGFan called it an "excellent soundtrack" that exceeded his expectations. He applauded Hamauzu's use of motifs and repetition of melodies across different tracks for tying together a widely disparate collection of material, and called the mix of orchestral and electronic pieces as "incredible". He concluded that the work represents Hamauzu's "masterpiece", though some of the tracks do not fit well outside of the context of the scene in the game they represent. Don Kotowski of Square Enix Music Online similarly approved of the soundtrack, also highlighting the repetition of themes as well done. He particularly called out the variance of musical styles used in different tracks, from the "jazz fusion" of "Pulse de Chocobo" to the rock music of "Snow's Theme". The bonus drama CD was critiqued by Gann as "fun for bonus content" if the listener understood Japanese and as having high production values for a drama CD, but he noted that it did not add any real information to the story of the game.

Track list

Literal translation of the original titles appear in (parentheses) if different.

Disc 1
| No. | Title | Japanese title (Romanization) | Length |
|---|---|---|---|
| 1. | "Prelude to FINAL FANTASY XIII" | FINAL FANTASY XIII プレリュード (FINAL FANTASY XIII Pureryūdo) | 2:55 |
| 2. | "FINAL FANTASY XIII - The Promise" | FINAL FANTASY XIII ～誓い～ (FINAL FANTASY XIII ~Chikai~) | 1:33 |
| 3. | "The Thirteenth Day" | 第13日 (Daijūsannichi) | 0:54 |
| 4. | "Defiers of Fate" | 運命への反逆 (Unmei e no Hangyaku) | 2:24 |
| 5. | "Saber's Edge" ("Blaze Edge") | ブレイズエッジ (Bureizu Ejji) | 3:14 |
| 6. | "The Hanging Edge" ("The Restricted Zone of Hanged Edge") | 封鎖区画ハングドエッジ (Fūsa Kukaku Hangudo Ejji) | 3:26 |
| 7. | "Those For the Purge" | パージされる者たち (Pājisareru Mono-tachi) | 3:05 |
| 8. | "The Warpath Home" | 帰るための戦い (Kaeru Tame no Tatakai) | 3:32 |
| 9. | "The Pulse Fal'Cie" | 下界のファルシ (Parusu no Farushi) | 1:13 |
| 10. | "Face It Later" | 逃げてもいいの (Nigete mo Ī no) | 0:55 |
| 11. | "Snow's Theme" | スノウのテーマ (Sunō no Tēma) | 3:48 |
| 12. | "The Vestige" | 異跡 (Iseki) | 2:48 |
| 13. | "Ragnarok" | ラグナロク (Ragunaroku) | 3:47 |
| 14. | "In the Sky That Night" ("The Sky of that Day") | あの日の空 (Ano Hi no Sora) | 1:24 |
| 15. | "Promised Eternity" ("Eternal Oath") | 永遠の誓い (Eien no Chikai) | 2:24 |
| 16. | "Eternal Love (Short Version)" | Eternal Love (Short Version) | 3:27 |
| 17. | "Lake Bresha" | ビルジ湖 (Biruji Ko) | 4:11 |
| 18. | "The Pulse L'Cie" | 下界のルシたち (Parusu no Rushi-tachi) | 1:37 |
| 19. | "Eidolons" | 召喚獣 (Shōkanjū) | 2:50 |

Disc 2
| No. | Title | Japanese title | Length |
|---|---|---|---|
| 1. | "Blinded By Light" ("Flash") | 閃光 (Senkō) | 2:55 |
| 2. | "Glory's Fanfare" | 栄光のファンファーレ (Enkō no Fanfāre) | 0:08 |
| 3. | "Battle Results" | バトルリザルト (Batoru Rizaruto) | 1:15 |
| 4. | "A Brief Respite" | つかのまの安息 (Tsukanoma no Ansoku) | 2:08 |
| 5. | "Cavalry Theme" | 騎兵隊のテーマ (Kiheitai no Tēma) | 2:38 |
| 6. | "Escape" | 脱出 (Dasshutsu) | 1:59 |
| 7. | "Crash Landing" | 撃墜 (Gekitsui) | 1:04 |
| 8. | "Daddy's Got the Blues" ("Afro Blues") | アフロブルース (Afuro Burūzu) | 4:28 |
| 9. | "The Vile Peaks" ("The Abandoned Area of Vile Peaks") | 遺棄領域ヴァイルピークス (Iki Ryōiki Vairu Pīkusu) | 3:02 |
| 10. | "Lightning's Theme" | ライトニングのテーマ (Raitoningu no Tēma) | 2:26 |
| 11. | "Sazh's Theme" | サッズのテーマ (Sazzu no Tēma) | 3:25 |
| 12. | "March of the Dreadnoughts" ("Dreadnought Assault!") | ドレッドノート大爆進！ (Doreddonōto Daibakushin!) | 2:31 |
| 13. | "The Gapra Whitewood" | ガプラ樹林 (Gapura Jurin) | 2:45 |
| 14. | "Tension in the Air" ("Tension") | 緊迫 (Kinpaku) | 3:28 |
| 15. | "Forever Fugitives" ("Endless Sprint") | 果てなき疾走 (Hatenaki Shissō) | 1:50 |
| 16. | "The Sunleth Waterscape" | サンレス水郷 (Sanresu Suigō) | 3:46 |
| 17. | "Lost Hope" | 見失った希望 (Miushinatta Kibō) | 2:58 |
| 18. | "To Hunt L'Cie" ("L'Cie Hunting Operation") | ルシ狩り作戦 (Rushi Kari Sakusen) | 2:40 |
| 19. | "No Way to Live" ("Hopeless Conflict") | 希望なき闘争 (Kibōnaki Tōsō) | 2:04 |
| 20. | "Sustained by Hate" ("The End of Love and Hate") | 恩讐の果て (Onshū no Hate) | 2:38 |
| 21. | "The Pulse L'Cie" ("The Gran Pulse l'Cie") | グラン=パルスのルシ (Guran-Parusu no Rushi) | 4:12 |
| 22. | "Serah's Theme" | セラのテーマ (Sera no Tēma) | 1:30 |

Disc 3
| No. | Title | Japanese title | Length |
|---|---|---|---|
| 1. | "Can't Catch a Break" ("Daddy Has to Fight!") | 父ちゃん奮闘だぁ! (Tō-chan Funtō da!) | 5:20 |
| 2. | "PSICOM" | PSICOM | 1:02 |
| 3. | "Hope's Theme" | ホープのテーマ (Hōpu no Tēma) | 3:30 |
| 4. | "This Is Your Home" | おまえの家はここだ (Omae no Uchi wa Koko da) | 2:16 |
| 5. | "Atonement" | 償い (Tsugunai) | 4:24 |
| 6. | "Vanille's Theme" | ヴァニラのテーマ (Vanira no Tēma) | 3:00 |
| 7. | "The Final Stage" ("The Appointed Time") | 刻限 (Kokugen) | 0:42 |
| 8. | "The Pompa Sancta" | ポンパ・サンクタ (Ponpa Sankuta) | 2:12 |
| 9. | "Nautilus" ("The Pleasure City of Nautilus") | 歓楽都市ノーチラス (Kanraku Toshi Nōchiarasu) | 4:58 |
| 10. | "Chocobos of Cocoon - Chasing Dreams" ("Cocoon de Chocobo ~Let's Have a Dream~") | コクーンdeチョコボ～夢をみようよ～ (Kokūn de Chokobo ~Yume o Miyō yo~) | 2:57 |
| 11. | "Feast of Betrayal" ("Feast of Lies") | 偽りの饗宴 (Itsuwari no Kyōen) | 3:17 |
| 12. | "Eidolons on Parade" ("The End of the Dream") | 夢の終わり (Yume no Owari) | 3:36 |
| 13. | "Test of the L'Cie" | ルシの試練 (Rushi no Shiren) | 2:23 |
| 14. | "All the World Against Us" ("Enemies of the World") | 世界の敵 (Sekai no Teki) | 1:16 |
| 15. | "Game Over" | ゲームオーバー (Gēmu Ōbā) | 1:15 |
| 16. | "Primarch Dysley" | 聖府代表ダイスリー (Seifu Daihyō Daisurī) | 3:03 |
| 17. | "Fighting Fate" ("Opposition to Fate") | 宿命への抗い (Unmei e no Aragai) | 2:28 |
| 18. | "Separate Paths" ("The Feelings of the L'Cie") | ルシたちの想い (Rushi-tachi no Omoi) | 2:42 |
| 19. | "Setting You Free" ("Successing Will") | 継ぎゆく意志 (Tsugiyuku Ishi) | 2:17 |
| 20. | "Desperate Struggle" | 死闘 (Shitō) | 3:49 |
| 21. | "Mysteries Abound" ("Mysteries") | 神秘 (Shinpi) | 2:41 |
| 22. | "Will to Fight" ("Choose to Fight") | Choose to Fight | 4:20 |

Disc 4
| No. | Title | Japanese title | Length |
|---|---|---|---|
| 1. | "Fang's Theme" | ファングのテーマ (Fangu no Tēma) | 3:31 |
| 2. | "Terra Incognita" ("The Foreign Continent of Gran Pulse") | 異境大陸グラン=パルス (Ikyō Tairiku Guran-Parusu) | 2:18 |
| 3. | "The Archylte Steppe" | アルカキルティ大平原 (Arukakiruti Daiheigen) | 4:25 |
| 4. | "Chocobos of Pulse" ("Pulse de Chocobo") | パルスdeチョコボ (Parusu de Chokobo) | 4:18 |
| 5. | "The Yaschas Massif" ("Mount Yaschas") | ヤシャス山 (Yashasu San) | 2:11 |
| 6. | "Memories of Happier Days" ("Tender Memories") | 優しい思い出 (Yasashī Omoide) | 3:13 |
| 7. | "Sulyya Springs" ("Sulyya Lake") | スーリヤ湖 (Sūriya Ko) | 3:25 |
| 8. | "Taejin's Tower" | テージンタワー (Tējin Tawā) | 3:08 |
| 9. | "Dust to Dust" ("Colorless World") | 色のない世界 (Iro no nai Sekai) | 3:49 |
| 10. | "The Road Home" | 帰郷 (Kikyō) | 1:07 |
| 11. | "Start Your Engines" ("Countdown") | カウントダウン (Kauntodaun) | 3:23 |
| 12. | "Eden Under Siege" ("Tumultuous Eden") | 動乱のエデン (Dōran no Eden) | 2:33 |
| 13. | "The Cradle Will Fall" ("Cradle of Demise") | 終焉の揺籃 (Shūen no Yōran) | 3:58 |
| 14. | "Born Anew" ("Birth") | 降誕 (Kōtan) | 2:59 |
| 15. | "Sinful Hope" | 罪深き希望 (Tsumibukaki Kibō) | 3:44 |
| 16. | "Fabula Nova Crystallis" | ファブラ・ノヴァ・クリスタリス (Fabura Nova Kurisutarisu) | 2:40 |
| 17. | "FINAL FANTASY XIII - Miracles" | FINAL FANTASY XIII ～奇跡～ (FINAL FANTASY XIII ~Kiseki~) | 2:49 |
| 18. | "Focus" | 使命 (Shimei) | 2:21 |
| 19. | "Nascent Requiem" | 生誕のレクイエム (Seitan no Rekuiemu) | 5:03 |
| 20. | "Determination" | 決意 (Ketsui) | 3:22 |
| 21. | "Kimi ga Irukara (Long Version)" ("Because You Are Here (Long Version)") | 君がいるから (Long Version) (Kimi ga Iru kara (Long Version)) | 6:22 |
| 22. | "Ending Credits" | エンディングロール (Endingu Rōru) | 4:42 |

== Soundtrack Plus ==
Final Fantasy XIII Original Soundtrack PLUS

Soundtrack album by Masashi Hamauzu
- Released: May 26, 2010
- Genre: Video game soundtrack
- Length: 50:10
- Label: Square Enix

Final Fantasy XIII Original Soundtrack PLUS is a soundtrack album of Final Fantasy XIII, containing a selection of arrangements of musical tracks from the game. It was composed and produced by Masashi Hamauzu, and arranged by Hamauzu, Ryo Yamazaki, Mitsuto Suzuki, Toshiyuki Oomori, and Yoshihisa Hirano. The single-disc soundtrack contains 16 tracks, covering a duration of 50:10. It was released on May 26, 2010 in Japan by Square Enix, bearing the catalog number SQEX-10192. Only tracks 5, 9, and 15 are pieces actually used in the game but not included in the original album. The tracks in the album include pieces made for early previews of the game, modified versions of songs used in the international version of the game rather than the Japanese version that the original soundtrack album was based on, and early versions or arrangements of pieces that were not used in the game—for example, "Hope_PfNer3" uses a piano while Hamauzu ended up using a guitar for the final piece.

For the unused versions of songs included in this album, Hamauzu re-recorded and produced them to match the quality of the songs that were eventually used in the original soundtrack. The numbers following the "M" in the title of some pieces refer to the version number of the track, which Hamauzu used to keep track of changes made to pieces during their development, occasionally incrementing them by hundreds for major changes. Hamauzu came up with the idea for the album originally because he wanted to release the English version of "Pulse de Chocobo" as a downloadable song; when he started adding in promotional tracks and alternative-version tracks he found that he had enough material to release as a full album. Several of the alternate version tracks appeared in the game during specific scenes, or were cut towards the end of development. Hamauzu feels that the album represents how large of an undertaking the Final Fantasy XIII project was, in that even the outtakes were enough to fill an album.

The album reached #70 on the Oricon charts, and remained on the charts for two weeks. It received a lukewarm review from Patrick Gann of RPGFan, who said that while the music included was "beautiful" and a few specific tracks were "pretty cool", "anyone hoping for a proper arrangement of this music will be sorely disappointed". He claimed that there was not much difference between many of the alternate versions of songs and their final versions in the original soundtrack, which meant that in his opinion owners of the original soundtrack would not get much out of the "Plus" album. Jayson Napolitano of Original Sound Version gave a similar review for the album; he felt that while it included several interesting pieces that could not be found elsewhere, it was in his opinion more of a collector's item than a stand-alone album and likely not worth the cost for most listeners.

Track list
| No. | Title | Japanese title | Length |
|---|---|---|---|
| 1. | "PV "FINAL FANTASY XIII 2007 JFS"" | PV「FINAL FANTASY XIII 2007 JFS」 | 3:00 |
| 2. | "PV "FINAL FANTASY XIII 2006 E3"" | PV「FINAL FANTASY XIII 2006 E3」 | 2:32 |
| 3. | "M1 No.2 title αVersion" | M1 No.2 title αVersion | 1:33 |
| 4. | "M3 No.4 BossA αVersion" | M3 No.4 BossA αVersion | 3:13 |
| 5. | "M306 OPN2 "Defiers of Fate" Palamecia Assault Version" | M306 OPN2「運命への反逆」パラメキア突入 Version | 5:11 |
| 6. | "Hope_PfNer3" | Hope_PfNer3 | 2:13 |
| 7. | "M42E "The Sunleth Waterscape" Overseas Version" | M42E 「サンレス水郷」海外 Version | 3:47 |
| 8. | "M36A "The Gapra Whitewood" Instrumental" | M36A「 ガプラ樹林」 Instrumental | 2:45 |
| 9. | "M74_2 PRO "Fighting Fate" No Chorus Version" | M74_2 PRO「宿命への抗い」 コーラス無し Version | 2:15 |
| 10. | "M64E "Chocobos of Cocoon" English Version" | M64E 「コクーンdeチョコボ」English Version | 3:03 |
| 11. | "M33 Lightning NW Version" | M33 Lightning NW Version | 2:26 |
| 12. | "M181 Shugeki2 Prototype" | M181 Shugeki2 Prototype | 3:06 |
| 13. | "M44B Sazh B+ Prototype" | M44B サッズB+ Prototype | 5:25 |
| 14. | "M106 Last Battle Prototype+" | M106 Last Battle Prototype+ | 3:24 |
| 15. | "M5_2 "Blinded By Light" Long Version" | M5_2 「閃光」Long Version | 2:31 |
| 16. | "M42 "The Sunleth Waterscape" Instrumental" | M42 「サンレス水郷」 Instrumental | 3:46 |

== Piano Collections ==
Piano Collections Final Fantasy XIII

Soundtrack album by Masashi Hamauzu
- Released: July 21, 2010
- Genre: Video game soundtrack
- Length: 45:09
- Label: Square Enix

Piano Collections Final Fantasy XIII is a soundtrack album of Final Fantasy XIII, containing a selection of piano arrangements of musical tracks from the game. It was composed and arranged by Masashi Hamauzu, and the pieces were performed by Aki Kuroda. Hamauzu and Kuroda had previously worked together when Hamauzu arranged the Final Fantasy X piano soundtrack album, and this previous collaboration made it easy for the two to work together. Hamauzu intended the arrangements to "stay away from recording the same music" on the piano. Though he noted that many of the tracks are similar to the originals, he wanted to "bring out subtle properties of the in-game melodies and making them more distinct", rather than greatly change the pieces. The single-disc soundtrack contains 10 tracks, covering a duration of 45:09. It was released on July 21, 2010 in Japan by Square Enix, bearing the catalog number SQEX-10196.

Chris Greening of Square Enix Music Online reviewed the album as "a sophisticated piano collection" that was enjoyable to listen to, though he noted that the arrangements were "straightforward" rather than ambitious. Jayson Napolitano of Original Sound Version gave a similar review for the album; he felt that it was an amazing album that, while not as technically difficult or different enough from the source material for some listeners, was still very beautiful and well-arranged. Gann of RPGFan, however, felt disappointed by the album, calling the arrangements "soul-less" and full of "needless grandiosity". He concluded that the original pieces were too rich and complex to translate well to solo piano arrangements, which left the works without substance as they did not deviate enough from the source material.

Track list
| No. | Title | Japanese title | Length |
|---|---|---|---|
| 1. | "Lightning's Theme ~ Blinded By Light" | ライトニングのテーマ－閃光 | 3:43 |
| 2. | "FINAL FANTASY XIII - The Promise ~ The Sunleth Waterscape" | FINAL FANTASY XIII ～誓い～－サンレス水郷 | 4:46 |
| 3. | "March of the Dreadnoughts" | ドレッドノート大爆進 | 3:18 |
| 4. | "The Gapra Whitewood" | ガプラ樹林 | 4:36 |
| 5. | "Nautilus" | 歓楽都市ノーチラス | 6:12 |
| 6. | "Vanille's Theme ~ Memories of Happier Days ~ The Road Home" | ヴァニラのテーマ－優しい思い出－帰郷 | 4:37 |
| 7. | "Nascent Requiem" | 生誕のレクイエム | 4:03 |
| 8. | "Fang's Theme" | ファングのテーマ | 3:53 |
| 9. | "Reminiscence - Sulyya Springs Motif" | 回想 ～「スーリヤ湖」のモチーフによる～ | 5:16 |
| 10. | "Prelude to FINAL FANTASY XIII Full Version" | FINAL FANTASY XIII プレリュード FULL VERSION | 4:45 |

== "Kimi ga Iru Kara" ==
"Kimi ga Iru Kara" (君がいるから, Because You're Here) is the theme song of the Japanese version of Final Fantasy XIII. Sung by Sayuri Sugawara, it was composed by Masashi Hamauzu and had its lyrics written by Sugawara and Yukino Nakajima. The English version of the game used a song by Leona Lewis, "My Hands", which was not specially written for the game like the Japanese song. "Kimi ga Iru Kara" was released as a single on December 2, 2009 by For Life Music, and included in addition to the piece five other tracks. These tracks are "Eternal Love", another song written for Final Fantasy XIII, and "Christmas Again", a J-Pop song by Sugawara that incorporates some music from 19th-century composer Franz Liszt. The last three tracks are instrumental versions of these three songs. The single has a length of 30:04, and has the catalog number of FLCF-4311. A special edition of the single includes a bonus DVD, containing a seven-minute video of a compilation of promotional videos for the game.

"Kimi ga Iru Kara" reached #11 on the Japanese Oricon charts, and remained on the charts for 11 weeks. The single received generally unfavourable reviews from video game music critics. Gann of RPGFan called it "vanilla" and said that the single, especially the headline track, was over-produced and uninteresting. While he did not mind "Eternal Love" as much, he still felt that the CD was his least favorite Final Fantasy theme single. Square Enix Music Online had similar opinions of the release, calling it "bland". They felt that while "Kimi ga Iru Kara" was still better than "My Hands", and "Eternal Love", the single was disappointing in both the context of Final Fantasy singles and of Sugawara's previous discography.

Track list
| No. | Title | Length |
|---|---|---|
| 1. | "Kimi ga iru kara" (君がいるから) | 5:54 |
| 2. | "Eternal Love" | 4:36 |
| 3. | "Christmas Again" | 4:34 |
| 4. | "Kimi ga iru kara (Instrumental)" (君がいるから (Instrumental)) | 5:54 |
| 5. | "Eternal Love (Instrumental)" | 4:35 |
| 6. | "Christmas Again (Instrumental)" | 4:32 |

== Legacy ==
Final Fantasy XIII won the 2010 Soundtrack of the Year Golden Joystick Award. Music from Final Fantasy XIII was performed live in concert at the Distant Worlds II - More Music from Final Fantasy concert in Stockholm, Sweden by the Royal Stockholm Philharmonic Orchestra on June 12, 2010. The concert is part of the Distant Worlds concert series, the latest of several Final Fantasy concert series, and the tracks from Final Fantasy XIII, "The Promise" and "Fang's Theme", have been added to the series' permanent rotation. The official album for the concert does not include those two tracks. The full Piano Collections Final Fantasy XIII album was played at a concert in 2010: by Aki Kuroda in Osaka on October 29, and in Yokohama on September 3. Selections were played in a concert of Hamauzu's work in Paris on April 22, 2011.

A book of piano sheet music arrangements from the original soundtrack has been arranged for the piano and published by DOREMI Music Publishing. All songs in each book have been rewritten by Asako Niwa as beginning to intermediate level piano solos, though they are meant to sound as much like the originals as possible. The actual piano sheet music from the Final Fantasy XIII Piano Collection album has been published as a corresponding music book by Yamaha Music Media. Yamaha has additionally published its own sheet music book for piano arrangements from the original soundtrack, as well as a book of piano and vocal sheet music for the vocal tracks on the original soundtrack.
