= First Story (album) =

Studio album by Sayuri Sugawara
- Released: January 27, 2010
- Recorded: 2009
- Genre: J-pop
- Length: 1:04:56
- Label: For Life Music

Sayuri Sugawara chronology
| First Story (2010) | Close To You (2010) |

Alternative Cover
- CD + DVD Cover

Singles from First Story
- 1. "Ano Hi no Yakusoku" Released: September 30, 2009; 2. "Kimi ga Iru Kara" Released: December 2, 2009

First Story is Sayuri Sugawara's first album, released on January 27, 2010. The track 'Kimi ga Iru Kara' was used as the Japanese main theme for Final Fantasy XIII.

== Track listings ==
=== CD ===
All music is composed by Sin

| No. | Title | Lyrics | Length |
|---|---|---|---|
| 1. | "Arigato feat. FEROS (ありがとう; Thank You)" | Yukino Nakajima & FEROS | 4:39 |
| 2. | "Kimi ni Okuru Uta (キミに贈る歌; A Song for You)" | Yukino Nakajima | 4:27 |
| 3. | "Is This Love?" | Lisa Halim | 4:44 |
| 4. | "Kimi ga Iru Kara (君がいるから; Because You Are Here)" | Yukino Nakajima | 5:53 |
| 5. | "It's My Life" | Lisa Halim | 3:22 |
| 6. | "Ano hi no Yakusoku (あの日の約束; That Day's Promise)" | Yukino Nakajima | 5:03 |
| 7. | "alone..." | yulica & Sayuri Sugawara | 4:53 |
| 8. | "Suriru (スリル; Thrill)" | Lisa Halim | 4:23 |
| 9. | "Eternal Love" | Yukino Nakajima & Sayuri Sugawara | 4:35 |
| 10. | "Sakura no Michi (桜のみち; Road of Cherry Blossoms)" | Sayuri Sugawara | 5:11 |
| 11. | "Koi (恋; Love)" | Sayuri Sugawara | 3:57 |
| 12. | "Suupaasutaa☆ (スーパースター☆; Superstar☆)" | Sayuri Sugawara | 4:15 |
| 13. | "Destiny feat. FEROS <haru Ver.> (<春ver.>; <Spring Ver.>)" | Kazuki Matsumoto & FEROS | 4:25 |
| 14. | "ALWAYS" | Yukino Nakajima | 4:43 |

=== DVD ===
1. Koi (SUGAWARA SAYURI Special Live)
2. I still love you (SUGAWARA SAYURI Special Live)
3. Kimi ni Okuru Uta (SUGAWARA SAYURI Special Live)
4. Kimi ga Iru Kara (music video)
