= Kimi ga Iru Kara (Sayuri Sugawara song) =

Single by Sayuri Sugawara

from the album First Story
- B-side: "Eternal Love"; "Christmas Again"
- Released: December 2, 2009
- Recorded: 2009
- Genre: Pop
- Length: 5:54
- Label: For Life Music
- Songwriters: Sayuri Sugawara, Yukino Nakajima

Sayuri Sugawara singles chronology
"Ano Hi no Yakusoku" (2009)	"Kimi ga Iru Kara" (2009)	"Sunao ni Narenakute" (2010)

"Kimi ga Iru Kara" (君がいるから; "Because You're Here") is a song recorded by Japanese singer Sayuri Sugawara as her second single. The single was released on December 2, 2009, by For Life Music. "Kimi ga Iru Kara" serves as the theme song for the Japanese release of Final Fantasy XIII, while the B-side "Eternal Love", is also used in the game as an insert song. The other B-side, "Christmas Again", samples a piece of Franz Liszt's work.

== Track listing ==
No.	Title	Lyrics	Length
1.	"Kimi ga Iru Kara" (君がいるから "Because You Are Here")	Sayuri Sugawara, Yukino Nakajima	5:54
2.	"Eternal Love"	S. Sugawara, Y. Nakajima	4:35
3.	"Christmas Again"	Kazuki Matsumoto	4:34
4.	"Kimi ga Iru Kara (Instrumental)" (君がいるから (Instrumental))	S. Sugawara, Y. Nakajima	5:53
5.	"Eternal Love (Instrumental)"	S. Sugawara, Y. Nakajima	4:35
6.	"Christmas Again (Instrumental)"	K. Matsumoto	4:31

== Live performances ==
At a Final Fantasy event held on November 29, 2009, Sugawara was present and performed both "Kimi ga Iru Kara" and "Eternal Love" in front of 2,000 people. Sugawara also performed "Kimi ga Iru Kara" on the December 6 episode of Music Japan.

== Reception ==
=== Critical reception ===
The single received poor reviews from critics. Gann of RPGFan called it "vanilla" and said that the single, especially the headline track, was over-produced and uninteresting. While he did not mind "Eternal Love" as much, he still felt that the CD was his least favorite Final Fantasy theme single. Square Enix Music Online had similar opinions of the release, calling it "bland". They felt that while "Kimi ga Iru Kara" was better than "My Hands" and "Eternal Love", the single was still disappointing in both the context of Final Fantasy singles and of Sugawara's previous discography.

=== Chart performance ===
On the Oricon single chart, "Kimi ga Iru Kara" peaked at number 11. The single charted for 11 weeks and is currently her best-selling single, with 36,400 copies sold. The digital version of the song was certified gold by the Recording Industry Association of Japan.

== See also ==
- Music of Final Fantasy XIII
