= Keeper of the Flame (The Hiatus album) =

Keeper Of The Flame

Studio album by The Hiatus
- Released: March 26, 2014
- Genre: Alternative rock, experimental rock, progressive rock
- Language: English
- Label: Universal Music Japan; UPCH-20338
- Producer: Takeshi Hosomi

The Hiatus chronology
| Horse Riding (2013) | Keeper Of The Flame (2014) | Hands Of Gravity (2016) |

Keeper Of The Flame is the fourth full-length album created by The Hiatus. It was released on March 26, 2014. Keeper Of The Flame reached No. 8 on the Oricon chart.

== Track listing ==
All lyrics are written by Takeshi Hosomi; all music is composed by The Hiatus

CD
| No. | Title | Length |
|---|---|---|
| 1. | "Thirst" | 5:08 |
| 2. | "Something Ever After" | 4:30 |
| 3. | "Unhurt" | 3:42 |
| 4. | "Horse Riding" | 4:11 |
| 5. | "Sunset Off The Coastline" | 3:57 |
| 6. | "Interlude" | 0:53 |
| 7. | "Roller Coaster Ride Memories" | 4:34 |
| 8. | "Tales Of Sorrow Street" | 3:42 |
| 9. | "Waiting For The Sun" | 4:50 |
| 10. | "Don't Follow The Crowd" | 4:26 |
| 11. | "Burn To Shine" | 4:12 |
