= Horse Riding (EP) =

EP by The Hiatus
- Released: July 31, 2013
- Genre: Progressive rock, experimental rock, alternative rock
- Label: Universal Music Japan; UPCH-80333
- Producer: Takeshi Hosomi

The Hiatus chronology
| A World of Pandemonium (2011) | Horse Riding (2013) | Keeper Of The Flame (2014) |

Horse Riding is an extended play by The Hiatus released on July 31, 2013. Horse Riding reached No. 10 on the Oricon chart.

== Track listing ==
All music is composed by The Hiatus.

CD
| No. | Title | Length |
|---|---|---|
| 1. | "Horse Riding" | 4:11 |
| 2. | "Don't Follow The Crowd" | 4:27 |
| 3. | "Waiting For The Sun" | 4:48 |
