= Hatching Mayflies =

Single by The Hiatus
- Released: June 1, 2011
- Genre: Progressive rock, alternative rock
- Length: 11:20
- Label: For Life Music; FLCF-4375
- Producers: Takeshi Hosomi, Hirohisa Horie

The Hiatus singles chronology
| "Insomnia" (2009) | "Hatching Mayflies" (2011) |

"Hatching Mayflies" is a maxi single by The Hiatus released on June 1, 2011. It peaked at number 8 on Oricon Singles Chart.

== Track listing ==
All music is composed by The Hiatus.

CD
| No. | Title | Length |
|---|---|---|
| 1. | "Bittersweet/Hatching Mayflies" | 4:27 |
| 2. | "The Brainwasher" | 3:06 |
| 3. | "Snowflakes" | 3:45 |
