= Sunao ni Narenakute (song) =

Single by Sayuri Sugawara
- B-side: "Stay with You"; "Glow"
- Released: May 19, 2010
- Recorded: 2010
- Genre: Pop
- Label: For Life Music
- Songwriter: Yukino Nakajima

Sayuri Sugawara singles chronology
"Kimi ga Iru Kara" (2009)	"Sunao ni Narenakute" (2010)	""Suki" to Iu Kotoba" (2010)

"Sunao ni Narenakute" (素直になれなくて, "Getting Used to Honesty") is a song recorded by Japanese pop singer Sayuri Sugawara. The single was released on May 19, 2010 by For Life Music. The title track is the theme song for the Japanese television drama of the same name.

== Track listing ==
All music is composed by Sin except for "Glow", which was composed by Aini

No.	Title	Lyrics	Length
1.	"Sunao ni Narenakute" (素直になれなくて "Getting Used to Honesty")	Yukino Nakajima
2.	"Stay with You"	Kanako Katō, Sayuri Sugawara
3.	"Glow"	K. Katō, S. Sugawara
4.	"Sunao ni Narenakute (Instrumental)"	Y. Nakajima
5.	"Stay with You (Instrumental)"	K. Katō, S. Sugawara
6.	"Glow (Instrumental)"	K. Katō, S. Sugawara
