= Insomnia (The Hiatus song) =

Single by The Hiatus
- Released: November 18, 2009
- Genre: Alternative rock, progressive rock
- Length: 13:57
- Label: For Life Music; FLCF-4309
- Producers: Takeshi Hosomi, Hirohisa Horie

The Hiatus singles chronology
"Insomnia" (2009)	"Hatching Mayflies" (2011)

"Insomnia" is a maxi single by The Hiatus released on November 18, 2009. It peaked at number 5 on Oricon Singles Chart.

This single was produced by Takeshi Hosomi and Hirohisa Horie. All the lyrics were written by Hosomi but the music was composed by all of the members; Seigen Tokuzawa arranged the string section of "Insomnia". The record jacket was designed by Balcolony and Admir Jahic drew the cover art.

== Track listing ==
All lyrics are written by Takeshi hosomi; all music is composed by The Hiatus.

CD
No.	Title	Length
1.	"Insomnia"	4:06
2.	"Curse of Mine"	3:47
3.	"Antibiotic"	6:04

== Recording members ==
- Takeshi Hosomi: vocal (all songs), guitar (track 1, 2)
- masasucks: guitar (all songs)
- Koji Ueno: bass guitar (all songs)
- Takashi Kashikura: drums, programming (all songs)
- Masakazu Ichise: drums, percussions (track 3)
- Hirohisa Horie: electronic keyboard (all songs), synthesizer (track 3)
- Ichiyo Izawa: piano (track 3)
- Seigen Tokuzawa: string instruments (track 1)
