= The End of the Dream (disambiguation) =

The End of the Dream or End of the Dream may refer to:

- The End of the Dream/Rouge, a single by Luna Sea
- "End of the Dream", a song by Evanescence from Evanescence
- The End of the Dream, a novel by Philip Wylie
- "The End of the Dream", an episode of the anime Godannar
- "The End of the Dream", an episode of the anime Android Kikaider: The Animation
- "The End of the Dream", an episode of the anime Unnamed Memory
- "Eidolons on Parade", also known as the "The End of the Dream", an instrumental by Masashi Hamauzu from Final Fantasy XIII Original Soundtrack
- "Final de vis" (transl. The End of the Dream), a song by Răzvan Fodor
