= Miss Monday =

Japanese musician (born 1976)

Miss Monday (born 1976) is a Japanese hip-hop and R&B artist. She sings as well as raps, and has collaborated with other artists such as Sowelu, JAMOSA, and Youngshim. She began her career in 2000, releasing singles on the I.D. Records label before being signed by the Japanese arm of Epic Records, for whom she recorded several albums before parting company with them in 2007. After that, she signed with For Life Music Entertainment until her retirement in 2018.

== Discography ==
=== Singles ===
1. [2000.07.21] "もっと..."
2. [2000.12.08] "JIKANRYKOU"
3. [2001.11.21] "Monday Freak"
4. [2002.02.20] "Lady meets girl"
5. [2002.05.09] "まもなく、晴れ" feat. Leyona
6. [2002.07.24] "Soul Flower"
7. [2003.04.09] "Curious"
8. [2003.05.21] "Playground" feat. HUNGER
9. [2004.03.10] "Roots" feat. Spinna B-ill
10. [2004.06.23] "暁ニ想フ" feat. Sowelu
11. [2004.10.06] "君に出逢えてありがとう"
12. [2005.05.24] "雨虹 -no rain, no rainbow-"
13. [2007.07.18] "Ohana"
14. [2007.10.03] "シアワセの種"
15. [2009.01.28] "The Light" feat. kJ from Dragon Ash, Naotarō Moriyama, and PES from RIP SLYME
16. [2010.03.24] "さよなら" feat. Sayuri Sugawara

=== Albums ===
1. [2002.03.06] Free Ya
2. [2003.04.23] Natural
3. [2004.11.03] Miss Rainbow
4. [2006.06.21] &I
5. [2007.07.18] Footstamp Vol. 1
6. [2007.12.05] Kiss the Sky
7. [2009.04.08] Love & the Light (w/a white lie)
8. [2010.06.23] Beautiful
9. [2011.07.13] &U
