= Ellegarden (album) =

Studio album by Ellegarden
- Released: May 23, 2001
- Genre: Rock
- Length: 18:21
- Label: Dynamord

Ellegarden chronology
Ellegarden (2001)	My Own Destruction (2002)

Ellegarden is the first EP album by the Japanese music group Ellegarden. It was released on May 23, 2001.

== Track listing ==
1. The End of the World - 4:01
2. Stupid - 3:46
3. Hana (花, Flower) - 4:30
4. Punk - 2:34
5. Knife (ナイフ) - 3:31

== Charts ==
Chart (2001)	Peak position
Japanese Albums (Oricon)	240
