= Sunao ni Narenakute =

Japanese television series

- Promotional poster of Sunao ni Narenakute
- Genre: Drama; Romance
- Starring: See below
- Opening theme: Hard to say I love you: Iidasenakute by WEAVER; Great DJ by the Ting Tings
- Ending theme: Sunao ni Narenakute by Sugawara Sayuri
- Country of origin: Japan
- Original language: Japanese
- No. of series: 1
- No. of episodes: 11

Production
- Producer: Nakano Toshiyuki
- Production location: Tokyo
- Running time: 47 minutes

Original release
- Network: Fuji TV
- Release: April 15 – June 24, 2010

Sunao ni Narenakute (素直になれなくて) (Hard to Say I Love You) is a Japanese television drama that aired on Fuji TV from April 15 to June 24, 2010.

== Plot ==
This is a story about the blossoming friendship of five young people who were brought together by Twitter, and their journey to finding honesty with each other and with themselves.

Nakajima looks up to his father, who was a war photographer, but can only get a job as an assistant for gravure magazines. Mizuno is a provisional high school teacher, currently on probation. Nishimura is Mizuno's best friend, whose boyfriend has been avoiding her since she discovered she was pregnant. Ichihara works at a magazine where he is being blackmailed into sexual favours by his chief editor. Park, on Twitter, takes on the persona of a doctor, when he is actually working at a company that sells medical equipment to uninterested doctors, and at the same time, trying to take care of his younger sister.

== Cast ==
- Eita as Keisuke Nakajima/"Nakaji"
- Juri Ueno as Tsukiko Mizuno/"Haru"
- Megumi Seki as Hikaru Nishimura/"Peach"
- Tetsuji Tamayama as Kaoru Ichihara/"Linda"
- Kim Jaejoong as Park Seon-soo/"Doctor"
- Haruka Kinami as Park Min-ha
- Yuichi Nakamura as Shu Mizuno
- Shogo Sakamoto as Kenta Matsujima
- Ryo Ryusei as Masafumi Takahashi
- Rina Aizawa as Yuki Maeda
- Eri Watanabe as Mariko Okuda
- Kenichi Yajima as Tomohiko Yamamoto
- Tetsushi Tanaka as Takashi Minehara
- Toshihide Tonesaku as Takafumi Shiraishi
- Mayumi Asaka as Misako Ichihara
- Haruka Igawa as Kiriko Yamamoto
- Jun Fubuki as Sachiko Mizuno

== Ratings ==
Date	Episode	Rating (Kanto Region)
04-15-2010	1	11.9%
04-22-2010	2	13.2%
04-29-2010	3	10.8%
05-06-2010	4	10.3%
05-13-2010	5	10.9%
05-20-2010	6	11.6%
05-27-2010	7	11.6%
06-03-2010	8	11.8%
06-10-2010	9	10.4%
06-17-2010	10	9.9%
06-24-2010	11	10.8%
average		11.2%

Source: Video Research, Ltd.

== Production credits ==
- Screenwriter: Eriko Kitagawa
- Directors: Mitsuno Michio and Nishisaka Mizuki

Preceded by Fumo Chitai	Fuji TV Mokuyou Gekijou Drama; April 15, 2010 – June 24, 2010	Succeeded by Gold
