= The Hiatus =

Japanese band

- Origin: Japan
- Genres: Alternative rock, progressive rock, experimental rock
- Years active: 2009–present
- Labels: For Life Music, Iron Gear, Nayutawave
- Members: Takeshi Hosomi; Masasucks; Koji Ueno; Takashi Kashikura; Ichiyo Izawa
- Past members: Hirohisa Horie
- Website: http://thehiatus.com/ https://www.universal-music.co.jp/the-hiatus

The Hiatus is a Japanese rock supergroup formed by Takeshi Hosomi, lead vocalist of Ellegarden.

== Members ==
- Takeshi Hosomi (細美 武士, Hosomi Takeshi) – vocals, guitar (Ellegarden, MONOEYES)
- Masasucks – guitar (Fullscratch)
- Koji Ueno (ウエノ コウジ, Ueno Koji) – bass (Radio Caroline, ex-Thee Michelle Gun Elephant)
- Takashi Kashikura (柏倉 隆史, Kashikura Takashi) – drums (Toe)
- Hirohisa Horie (堀江 博久, Horie Hirohisa) – keyboard (Neil & Iraiza) - Left group in late 2012 to pursue his own album

Live support members

- Masakazu Ichise (一瀬 正和, Ichise Masakazu) – drums (Asparagus)
- Ichiyo Izawa (伊澤 一葉, Izawa Ichiyou) – keyboard (Tokyo Jihen) - Became full-time keyboard player after Hirohisa Horie's departure

Visual artists

- Kaori Maki (牧かほり, Maki Kaori) – illustration
- Balcolony – art direction/design
- Sora Matsumoto (松本 空, Matsumoto Sora) – CGI direction/motion graphics
- Shuichi Banba (番場 秀一, Banba Shuichi) – music video director

== Discography ==
Albums

- Trash We'd Love (May 27, 2009)
- Anomaly (June 30, 2010)
- A World of Pandemonium (November 23, 2011)
- Keeper of the Flame (March 26, 2014)
- Hands of Gravity (July 6, 2016)
- Our Secret Spot (July 24, 2019)

EPs

- Insomnia (November 18, 2009)
- Hatching Mayflies (June 1, 2011)
- Horse Riding (July 31, 2013)

DVD

- The Hiatus Trash We'd Love Love Tour Final at Studio Coast (December 23, 2009)
- The Afterglow - A World of Pandemonium (September 12, 2012)
- The Afterglow Tour 2012 (March 22, 2013)
- Closing Night - Keeper of the Flame Tour 2014 - Nippon Budokan 2014.12.22 (June 24, 2015)

Live albums

- The Afterglow Tour 2012 (March 22, 2013)

== See also ==
- Ellegarden
- Nothing's Carved in Stone
