= Figureheads Compilation =

Compilation album by Ellegarden
- Released: July 2, 2007
- Genre: Punk rock
- Length: 34:19
- Label: Nettwerk

Ellegarden chronology
Eleven Fire Crackers (2006)	Figureheads Compilation (2007)	Ellegarden Best (1999–2008) (2008)

Figureheads Compilation is the sixth full-length album released by the Japanese music group Ellegarden. It was released on July 2, 2007 under the Nettwerk label.

== Track listing ==
1. The Autumn Song- 3:03
2. Red Hot - 2:41
3. Stereoman - 3:34
4. Raindrops - 3:39
5. Supernova - 3:36
6. Marry Me - 2:50
7. Missing - 3:28
8. Windy Day - 4:13
9. Middle of Nowhere - 3:57
10. I Hate It - 3:18
