= Bring Your Board!! =

Studio album by Ellegarden
- Released: July 2, 2003
- Genres: Punk rock, pop punk
- Length: 34:29
- Label: Dynamord

Ellegarden chronology
Don't Trust Anyone But Us (2002)	Bring Your Board!! (2003)	Pepperoni Quattro (2004)

Bring Your Board!! is the second full album by the Japanese music group Ellegarden. It was released on July 2, 2003.

== Track listing ==
1. Surfrider Association - 2:43
2. No. 13 - 3:35
3. Jitterbug (ジターバグ) - 3:20
4. A Song for James - 3:28
5. Wannabies - 3:17
6. Insane - 3:38
7. My Friend Is Falling Down - 3:20
8. Dancing in a Circle - 3:17
9. Cuomo - 1:49
10. Kinsei (金星, Venus) - 3:17
11. So Sad - 2:45

== Charts ==
Chart (2003)	Peak position
Japanese Albums (Oricon)	75
