= Final Fantasy XIII =

2009 video game

- Cover art, featuring the game's protagonist, Lightning
- Developer: Square Enix 1st Production Department (Note: Ported to Windows 10 by Virtuos)
- Publisher: Square Enix
- Director: Motomu Toriyama
- Producer: Yoshinori Kitase
- Programmer: Yoshiki Kashitani
- Artists: Isamu Kamikokuryo; Tetsuya Nomura
- Writers: Daisuke Watanabe; Motomu Toriyama
- Composer: Masashi Hamauzu
- Series: Final Fantasy; Fabula Nova Crystallis
- Engine: Crystal Tools
- Platforms: PlayStation 3; Xbox 360; Windows
- Release: PlayStation 3: JP: December 17, 2009; WW: March 9, 2010; Xbox 360: WW: March 9, 2010; JP: December 16, 2010; Windows: WW: October 9, 2014
- Genre: Role-playing
- Mode: Single-player

Final Fantasy XIII (Note: Japanese: ファイナルファンタジーXIII, Hepburn: Fainaru Fantajī Sātīn) is a 2009 role-playing video game developed and published by Square Enix for the PlayStation 3 and Xbox 360 consoles and later for Windows (in 2014). Released in Japan in December 2009 and internationally in March 2010, it is the thirteenth title in the mainline Final Fantasy series. The game includes fast-paced combat, a new system for the series for determining which abilities are developed for the characters called "Crystarium", and a customizable "Paradigm" system to control which abilities are used by the characters. Final Fantasy XIII includes elements from the previous games in the series, such as summoned monsters, chocobos, and airships.

The game takes place in the fictional floating world of Cocoon, whose government, the Sanctum, is ordering a purge of civilians who have supposedly come into contact with Pulse, the much-feared world below. The former soldier Lightning begins her fight against the government in order to save her sister who has been branded as an unwilling servant to a god-like being from Pulse, making her an enemy of Cocoon. Lightning is soon joined by a band of allies, and together the group also become marked by the same Pulse creature. They rally against the Sanctum while trying to discover their assigned task and whether they can avoid being turned into monsters or crystals at the completion.

Development began in 2004, and the game was first announced at Electronic Entertainment Expo (E3) 2006. Final Fantasy XIII is the flagship title of the Fabula Nova Crystallis collection of Final Fantasy games and is the first game to use Square Enix's Crystal Tools engine. Final Fantasy XIII was critically acclaimed in Japan and received mostly positive reviews from Western video game publications, which praised the game's graphics, presentation, and battle system. The game's linearity received a more mixed reception from some critics. Selling 1.7 million copies in Japan in 2009, Final Fantasy XIII became the fastest-selling title in the history of the series. As of 2017, the game has sold over 7 million copies worldwide on consoles. The Windows version has sold over 746,000 copies according to SteamSpy. A sequel, titled Final Fantasy XIII-2, was released in December 2011 in Japan and in February 2012 in North America and PAL regions. A second sequel, titled Lightning Returns: Final Fantasy XIII, which concludes Lightning's story and the Final Fantasy XIII series, was released in November 2013 in Japan and in February 2014 in North America and PAL regions. As of September 2014, the Final Fantasy XIII series has shipped over 11 million copies worldwide.

The game was added to backward compatibility for Xbox One in November 2018 along with its sequels. It is also Xbox One X Enhanced, allowing it to run at a higher resolution.

== Gameplay ==
The player directly controls the on-screen character through a third-person perspective to interact with people, objects, and enemies throughout the game. The player can also turn the camera around the characters, which allows for a 360° view of the surroundings. The world of Final Fantasy XIII is rendered to scale relative to the characters in it; instead of a caricature of the character roaming around miniature terrain, as found in earlier Final Fantasy games, every area is represented proportionally. The player navigates the world by foot or by chocobo. Players may save their game to a hard disk drive using save stations, where the player can also purchase items from retail networks or upgrade their weapons. An in-game datalog provides a bestiary and incidental information about the world of Final Fantasy XIII. The Final Fantasy XIII Ultimate Hits International version of the game, released in Japan, also contains an "Easy" mode option.

=== Battle system ===
The Final Fantasy XIII battle system, with the "Paradigm Shift" option, the Active Time Battle (ATB) bar filling beneath it with five slots and two actions queued, and the three active characters' health and roles displayed. The enemy's name and damage percentage are shown in the upper right corner.

As in Final Fantasy XII, enemies are integrated into the open field and can be approached or avoided by the player. When the player's character touches an enemy, the screen transitions from the regular map to a separate battle screen similar to those used in previous Final Fantasy titles; the character's health is fully restored after each battle.

A maximum of three characters may be used in battles, which use a variant on the series' traditional Active Time Battle (ATB) system first featured in Final Fantasy IV. Unlike previous games in the series, the player only controls the lead character while the remaining two characters are controlled by the game's artificial intelligence (AI). During battle, the player selects an action from the menus, such as Attack, Magic, and Item. Each action requires a specific number of slots on the ATB bar, which refills in real time to a set maximum number; this total size gradually increases throughout the game from two to six.

The Paradigm system allows the player to program "Paradigms" in which the active party members have a specific role in combat, roughly akin to the job system of previous games. The player can only choose from a limited stock of paradigms set up outside of battle, limiting the possible combinations of roles available; this is the only way of directing AI-controlled party members. The roles consist of Commando, dealing physical damage; Ravager, using elemental magic; Medic, a role which can heal and remove negative status ailments; Synergist, which uses magic to strengthen allies by giving positive statuses; Saboteur, which uses magic to weaken enemies by inflicting negative statuses; and Sentinel, which has protective abilities and may take on enemy focus.

In addition to a health bar, each enemy has a stagger bar (or "chain bonus"), indicating with a percentage starting at 100 the strength of attacks dealt by the player. When the chain bonus reaches an amount specific to the kind of enemy, they are staggered. Stagger increases damage massively by providing an instant boost to the chain bonus, and may launch the enemy into the air. Stagger is increased by a large amount by magic-based attacks, but will fall unless sustained by physical attacks.

Each leader or controlled character can summon a specific Eidolon into battle. These summoned creatures include series staples Odin, Shiva, Alexander, and Bahamut, and newcomers Hecatoncheir and Brynhildr. When summoned, the Eidolon stays in combat while the characters accompanying the summoner leave the party. While an Eidolon is summoned, the player can trigger a feature called Gestalt Mode, in which the Eidolon transforms into a different form and performs different attacks while the summoning character rides them.

=== Crystarium ===
The Crystarium is a leveling system consisting of six crystals and resembles the Sphere Grid from Final Fantasy X. Each crystal in the Crystarium represents one of the six roles, and is divided into ten levels. Each level contains various nodes that supply bonuses to health, strength, or magic, or provide new abilities and accessory slots. These nodes are connected by a semi-linear path. The player may advance down the path by acquiring Crystogen Points, which are awarded after defeating enemies. The full Crystarium is not available to the player at the beginning of the game; at specific points in the game's plot, the player gains access to new crystals or levels.

== Plot ==
=== Setting ===
Final Fantasy XIII is set on the futuristic world of Gran Pulse (often simply called Pulse). Central to the story is Cocoon, a massive artificial sphere that floats above Pulse's surface and is ruled by the Sanctum, a theocratic government. The two worlds are controlled by fal'Cie /fælˈsiː/, mechanical beings with godlike power. The Cocoon fal'Cie are responsible for keeping Cocoon floating, as well as providing light and water to the people that live inside. Each fal'Cie handles a specific task. The fal'Cie have the capability of marking the humans that live in Pulse and Cocoon as their servants. These servants, called l'Cie /ləˈsiː/, are branded with a symbol representing either Pulse or Cocoon and are given a "Focus"—a task to complete. If the l'Cie complete their task in time, they are transformed to crystal and according to legend gain eternal life; otherwise they become mindless monsters called Cie'th /siːθ/. The l'Cie are not explicitly told their Focus, but are instead given visions that they must interpret.

Several hundred years before the events of the game, a battle known as the War of Transgression took place between Pulse and Cocoon. During the battle, l'Cie from Pulse attacked and ripped a large hole in Cocoon. Eventually, the l'Cie completed their focus and were turned to crystal. The hole was patched with material lifted from Pulse, and Cocoon's citizens have since lived in fear of another invasion; this fear is used by the Sanctum to remain in power. The Sanctum oversees two military branches: the Guardian Corps, responsible for keeping order on Cocoon, and the Public Security and Intelligence COMmand (PSICOM), the special forces in charge of dealing with any threat related to Pulse. The fal'Cie have given the humans advanced technology, including flying airships and mechanical creatures, and a form of magic also exists. This magic is normally only accessible to l'Cie, fal'Cie, and various monsters in Cocoon and Pulse, though distilled chemical forms can be used by normal humans through the use of Manadrives.

=== Characters ===
The six main playable characters of Final Fantasy XIII are Lightning (Ali Hillis/Maaya Sakamoto), the main protagonist of the game, a former soldier and older sister to Serah; Snow Villiers (Troy Baker/Daisuke Ono), Serah's fiancé and leader of NORA, a paramilitary group; Oerba Dia Vanille (Georgia van Cuylenburg/Yukari Fukui), the game's narrator and an exile who is later revealed to be a l'Cie from Pulse; Sazh Katzroy (Reno Wilson/Masashi Ebara), a civilian pilot and father to a young boy, Dajh; Hope Estheim (Vincent Martella/Yūki Kaji), a young boy who is struggling within the relationships he shares with his parents; and Oerba Yun Fang (Rachel Robinson/Mabuki Andou), a l'Cie from Pulse who is working with the Sanctum's Cavalry branch. Other characters include Galenth Dysley (S. Scott Bullock/Masaru Shinozuka), the ruler of the Sanctum and main antagonist; Cid Raines (Erik Davies/Yuichi Nakamura), a Sanctum Brigadier General in the Cavalry who does not trust the government; and Serah Farron (Laura Bailey/Minako Kotobuki), Lightning's younger sister and Snow's fiancée.

=== Story ===
The playable cast of Final Fantasy XIII. From left to right: Sazh Katzroy, Snow Villiers, Hope Estheim, Lightning, Oerba Yun Fang, and Oerba Dia Vanille.

In Cocoon, the citizens of the town of Bodhum are being evicted, or Purged, after coming in contact with something from Pulse. Over the course of the game, the player is shown flashbacks of the events of the previous thirteen days, which began when a fal'Cie from Pulse was discovered near Bodhum. Lightning's sister Serah had found the fal'Cie from Pulse and been changed into a l'Cie by it. Lightning and Sazh derail a Purge train bound for Pulse in an attempt to save Serah. As Snow leads his resistance group NORA to rescue the Purge exiles, several of them are killed. Heading to the fal'Cie Anima to save Serah, Snow is joined by two of the exiles: Hope and Vanille. The two parties meet at the fal'Cie, and find Serah just as she turns to crystal. Anima then brands them as l'Cie and they are cast out into a different part of Cocoon. During this transformation, the newly crested l'Cie all have the same vision: a monster called Ragnarok. Arguing over the ambiguous nature of the dreamed Focus, the party finds Serah in her crystallized form; Snow remains with her as the others leave.

Snow meets Cid and Fang, two members of the Cavalry, after he is captured and detained aboard the airship Lindblum. Meanwhile, the others flee from PSICOM before getting separated by an airstrike; Hope and Lightning travel to Palumpolum, while Sazh and Vanille travel to Nautilus. In Lightning's scenario, she unintentionally supports Hope's goal of killing Snow to avenge his mother's death. In Vanille's scenario, Sazh discusses how his son Dajh was turned into a l'Cie by a Cocoon fal'Cie and was taken by PSICOM to discover his Focus. In Palumpolum, Lightning attempts to dissuade Hope from going through with his revenge and meets Snow and Fang. Fang reveals that she and Vanille were l'Cie from Pulse who were turned into crystals; they were turned back into humans 13 days earlier, sparking the Purge. Hope attempts to murder Snow, but after being rescued during an airstrike, he decides not to go through with it. The four then flee the city with Cid's aid. In Nautilus, Vanille reveals herself to Sazh as a l'Cie from Pulse, and indirectly the reason that Dajh was turned into a l'Cie. Sazh and Vanille are then captured and detained on board the airship Palamecia.

On the Palamecia, the other members of the party reunite with Vanille and Sazh before they confront Galenth Dysley, the Sanctum's Primarch, who is the Cocoon fal'Cie ruler Barthandelus in disguise. Barthandelus tells the party that their Focus is to transform into the beast Ragnarok and slay the sleeping fal'Cie Orphan, who keeps Cocoon afloat above Pulse. Slaying Orphan will result in the destruction of Cocoon. The party flees and learns from Cid that the fal'Cie believe that Cocoon's destruction will summon the Maker, the creator of the worlds. The fal'Cie cannot harm Orphan themselves. Vanille and Fang reveal to the party that they were involved in the War of Transgression centuries earlier, and that their Focus then had been the same: to transform into Ragnarok and attempt to destroy Orphan. The party flies away to Pulse and journeys to Oerba, Vanille and Fang's hometown, where they hope to learn how to remove their l'Cie marks. The town is deserted, and they find no living people on the surface. The party is unsuccessful in removing their marks, and Barthandelus confronts them again. The party learns that Barthandelus has made Cid the new Primarch to create chaos in Cocoon to force the Cavalry to attack Cid and Orphan in a coup d'état.

The party infiltrates Cocoon and heads towards Orphan but soon discover that the Cavalry have been turned into Cie'th. The party defeats Barthandelus, but Orphan awakens and merges with Barthandelus, then compels Fang to finish her Focus as Ragnarok while the others are seemingly transformed into Cie'th. The party reappears in human form, preventing Fang from transforming. The party defeats Orphan and escapes Cocoon, which is now falling towards Pulse. As the rest of the party turns to crystal for completing their Focus, Vanille and Fang remain on Cocoon and transform into Ragnarok together to prevent a collision between Cocoon and Pulse. The rest of the party awaken from their crystallization on Pulse and find their l'Cie brands gone; Lightning, Hope, Snow and Sazh reunite with Serah and Dajh.

== Development ==
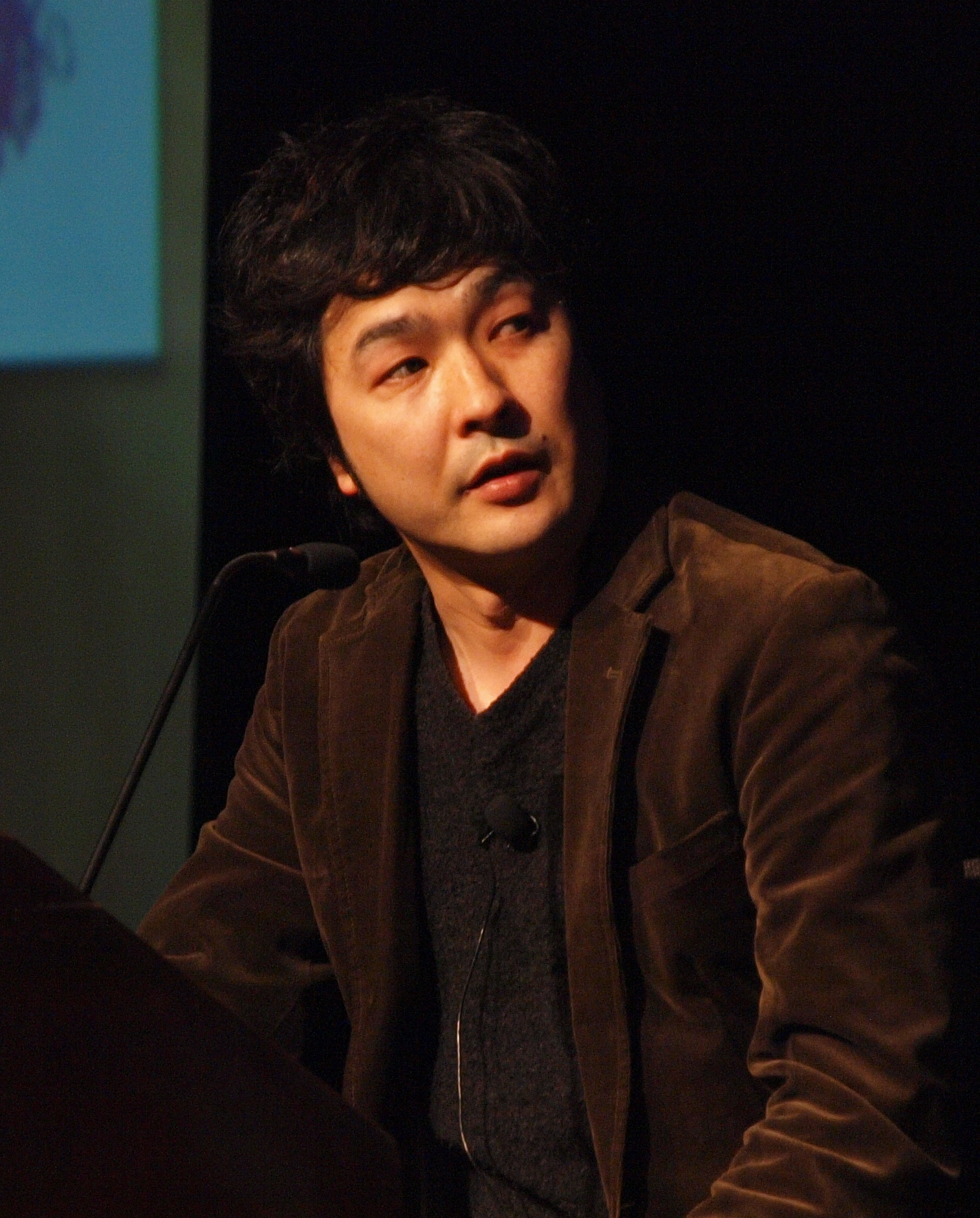
Director and scenario designer Motomu Toriyama at the 2010 Game Developers Conference

Development of Final Fantasy XIII began in February 2004, shortly after the release of Final Fantasy X-2 International + Last Mission in Japan. At the time, the project was internally referred to by the codename "Colors World". Over the first year, director Motomu Toriyama and scenario conceptor Kazushige Nojima conceived ideas for the plot. Nojima thought up the crystal mythology that became the basis for the Fabula Nova Crystallis series, including concepts such as the fal'Cie and l'Cie. Toriyama then created a story premised on this mythology. He wanted to portray "characters at the mercy of a predetermined, unjust fate" who "belong together but collide heavily". In order to achieve this, each of the story's thirteen chapters was made to focus on different protagonists. Chapters seven and eight were to mark a turning point in the interpersonal relationships of the party.

In March 2006, when the structural part of the narrative started to come together, lead scenario writer Daisuke Watanabe joined the team. Toriyama gave him a rough outline of the first eight chapters, which included several cornerstone scenes that needed to be kept, like when party members were separated or reunited. He told Watanabe what he wanted to express with the scenario, and asked him to flesh out the story and to strengthen how the points in his outline connected. For example, Toriyama's rudimentary instructions in the document would say "Snow and Hope reconcile". Watanabe had to decide about how the scenes with this reconciliation would play out, then write the scenario that way. To emphasize what the story tried to express, Watanabe adjusted the personalities Toriyama had given to each character. For example, he felt that the party should not have a "reliable and calm leader type" at the beginning of the story, in order to more accurately show the confusion and unease after the protagonists transform into l'Cie. Toriyama has said that one of the storytelling challenges was the despair of the characters and the many points at which they are seemingly cornered. He mentioned the scene where Sazh tries to commit suicide as one such example. Although Toriyama felt it was "almost a little too dark", he wanted to include something like it in the game. In contrast, he said that lighthearted elements such as Sazh's Chocobo chick helped maintain a good balance.

At the beginning of the development, the game was intended to be released on the PlayStation 2. In May 2005, after the positive reception of the tech demo of Final Fantasy VII, the team decided to move the game to the PlayStation 3 and developed it with the new Crystal Tools engine, a seventh generation multiplatform game engine created by Square Enix for its next generation games. Square Enix believed that developing a new engine would speed up development time later in the project, though it would initially cause a delay in the game's development. However, the delay was longer than originally anticipated as the engine had to accommodate the requirements of several other games in addition to XIII. Another factor in the platform move was the delayed release of Final Fantasy XII, which came out a very short time before the release of the PlayStation 3. A PC port was considered during development, but was decided against due to how Square Enix saw the video game market situation at the time as well as additional complexities that Square Enix did not have experience with related to the PC platform, such as security issues. Final Fantasy XIII was first shown at the 2006 E3 convention. The trailer shown was an artistic concept that did not represent the final concept for the game, since at the time there was no playable form of the game. Announced alongside the game was Final Fantasy Versus XIII, later retitled as Final Fantasy XV, and the PlayStation Portable game Final Fantasy Type-0, originally titled Final Fantasy Agito XIII, the three of which form the Fabula Nova Crystallis Final Fantasy series. Square Enix explained that although all three games are thematically linked, they are not directly related in terms of story.

The developers for Final Fantasy XIII were divided into multiple areas, with each developer or team focusing only on a specific task such as developing a specific in-game area or modeling characters. Each physical area of the game was developed separately; after an initial design was approved, teams were assigned to a specific location and filled in details without reusing assets from other areas. Several of the game's developers had worked on previous installments of the series. Director Motomu Toriyama had worked on Final Fantasy X and X-2; producer Yoshinori Kitase had worked on V through VIII and as the producer for X and X-2; main-character designer Tetsuya Nomura had performed the same role for VII, VIII, X, and X-2, and battle-system director Toshiro Tsuchida reprised that role from Final Fantasy X. As XIII was the first Final Fantasy game for the PlayStation 3, the development team's internal goal was for the game to have the same "gameplay and craftmanship" impact that Final Fantasy VII and X had as the first games of the series on their respective consoles. They aimed to sell five million copies of the game. Toriyama wanted the game to be "the ultimate single player RPG".

Tsuchida's concept for the battle system was to maintain the strategic nature of command-based battles. The system stemmed from a desire to create battles similar to those found in the film Final Fantasy VII: Advent Children. Magic points (MP), which had been a part of the battle system in previous Final Fantasy titles, were removed in the game's battle system as Tsuchida and the other designers felt that it gave players an incentive to not use their most powerful magic attacks due to the MP cost, in turn making battles less interesting. The Paradigm system was designed early in the battle system's development, with the intent of making battles rely on quickly changing strategies and feel fast-moving. Originally there were only five roles, but the Saboteur was later added as the designers felt that its abilities were missing from the game and did not fit with the other roles. Together with the maximum of three characters in a combat situation, the groupings of enemies were designed to force the player to switch Paradigms to keep them engaged in the battles.

Toriyama wanted Lightning to be a new type of female character with an athlete's body and a less feminine nature than some of the previous female characters of the series. His guideline to Nomura was to make her "strong and beautiful", and she was intended to be reminiscent of Final Fantasy VII's Cloud Strife. Fang was initially meant to be a male character, but the gender was changed to coincide with the updated character designs during the latter part of development. The graphics capabilities of the PS3 and Xbox 360 compared to previous consoles allowed Nomura to use more complex elements in the character designs than before, such as Lightning's cape and detailed facial features. This in turn meant that the art team had to do much more work for each character or area than in previous games. Nomura did not take an involved role in the creation of the non-playable characters.

Unlike previous games in the series which were more inspired by Asian locations and culture, Final Fantasy XIII was intended by the art team to be reminiscent of the United States. Pulse was based on landscape photographs the team took from across the country, and Cocoon was intended to be a "melting pot" of different ethnicities. The setting was also given a science fiction aesthetic to make it stand out more in comparison with other entries in the series. Art director Isamu Kamikokuryo revealed that many additional scenarios such as Lightning's home, which were functioning in an unreleased build during development, were left out of the final version due to concerns about the game's length and volume. Kamikokuryo said the content they cut was, in itself, enough to make another game. According to Toriyama, the cuts were made in "various stages of [the game's] development", and that some of the content was removed just before the game's completion. The game, unlike previous titles in the series, includes no explorable town areas; Toriyama said in an interview that the team was unable to make them as graphically appealing as the rest of the game and chose to eliminate them. Toriyama intended to have a piece of downloadable content available for the game that would include a new area, weapons and quests, but was forced to cut it as well due to quality concerns so late in the project and difficulties with the different systems for extra content on the two gaming consoles.

A playable demo of Final Fantasy XIII was included in the Japanese version of Final Fantasy VII Advent Children Complete, released on April 16, 2009. Toriyama stated that the release of the demo, which was not in the original development schedule, helped the team recognize a shared vision for what the game should look and feel like, a problem which had been plaguing the development team up until then. It helped the team prioritize the work that still needed to be done, which increased the development speed for the remainder of the project. The game was intended to appeal to both Western and Japanese audiences, and focus groups from both regions were used. The English localization began while development was still in progress to lessen the delay between the Japanese and worldwide releases. The game was initially going to be released solely for the PlayStation 3, but an Xbox 360 version was announced late in the game's development cycle. The Xbox version, due to technical limitations, runs at a lower resolution (720p maximum) than the PlayStation version and is spread across 3 discs.

=== Music ===
Masashi Hamauzu composed the game's soundtrack; his previous work on the series was as a co-composer for Final Fantasy X and as the main composer for Dirge of Cerberus: Final Fantasy VII. The game was the first main-series Final Fantasy game to not include any compositions by original series composer Nobuo Uematsu. Although Uematsu was originally announced to compose the main theme of the game, this role was taken over by Hamauzu after Uematsu signed on to compose the soundtrack for Final Fantasy XIV. The score features some pieces orchestrated by Yoshihisa Hirano, Toshiyuki Oomori, and Kunihito Shiina, with the Warsaw Philharmonic Orchestra. The song "My Hands", from British singer Leona Lewis' second album Echo, was chosen to replace Final Fantasy XIII's original theme song, "Kimi ga Iru Kara" by Sayuri Sugawara, for the game's international release. Square Enix president Yoichi Wada later said that it would have been better if the American branch of the company had produced a theme song from scratch, but a lack of staff led to the decision of licensing an existing song.

Music from the game has been released in several albums. Square Enix released the main soundtrack album, Final Fantasy XIII Original Soundtrack, on four Compact Discs in 2010. The album sold 16,000 copies the day of its release. Square Enix released selections from the soundtrack on two gramophone record albums in 2010: W/F: Music from Final Fantasy XIII and W/F: Music from Final Fantasy XIII Gentle Reveries. An album of arranged pieces from the soundtrack, Final Fantasy XIII Original Soundtrack -PLUS-, was also released by Square Enix in the same year, as was an album of piano arrangements. For Life Music published a single of the theme song for the Japanese version of the game, "Kimi ga Iru Kara" (君がいるから, "Because You're Here"), in 2009.

== Versions and merchandise ==
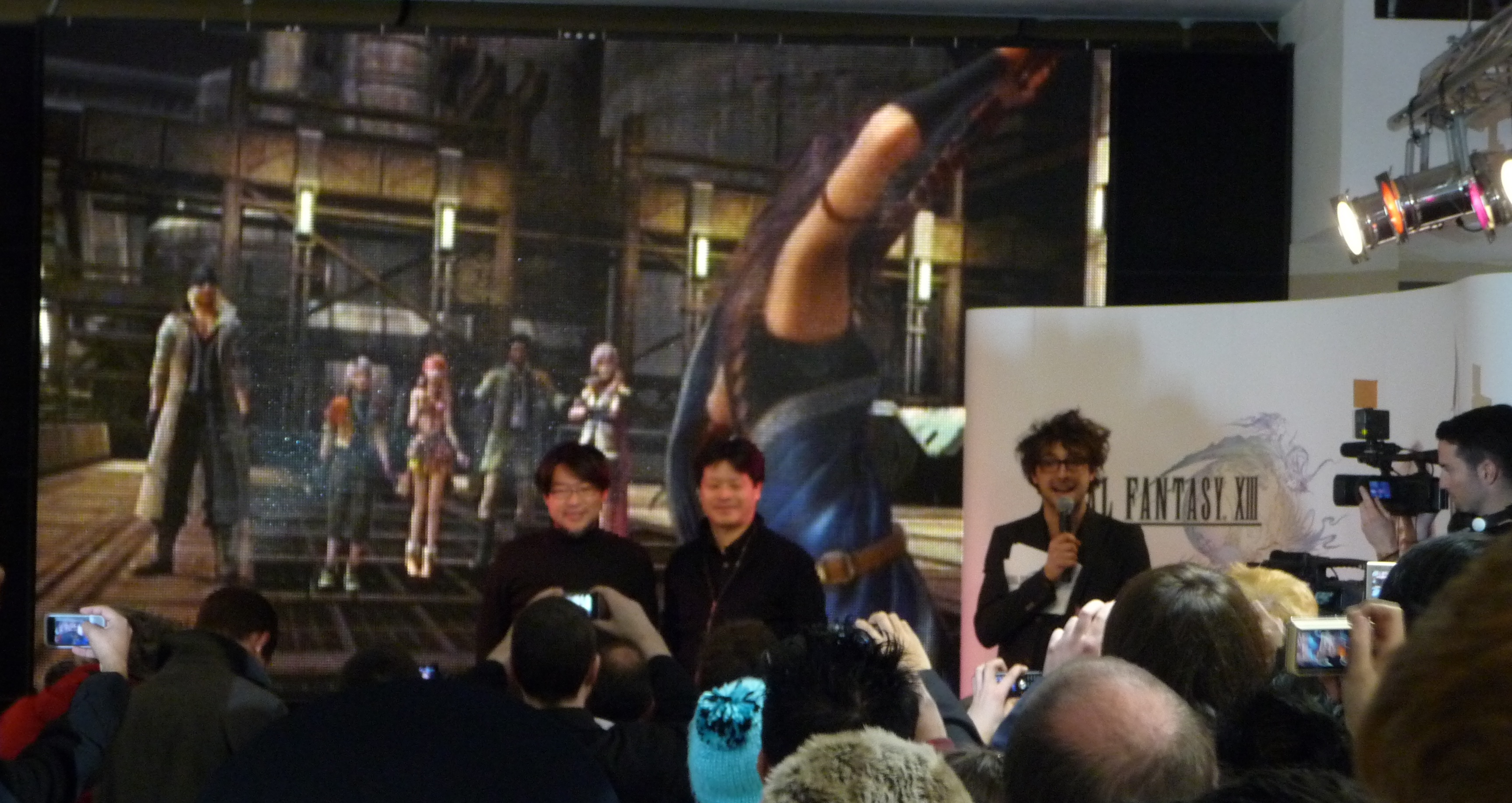
Art director Isamu Kamikokuryo (left) and producer Yoshinori Kitase (right) at the Final Fantasy XIII London Launch Event at HMV in March 2010, which was hosted by Alex Zane (holding microphone)

The game was released in Japan on December 17, 2009, and in North America, Europe and Australia on March 9, 2010. Alongside the release of the game in Japan, Japanese alcoholic beverage distributor Suntory released the "Final Fantasy XIII Elixir" to promote the game. On the same day, a Final Fantasy XIII PlayStation Home personal space was made available for free in Japan until January 13, 2010, along with a costume and personal space furnishings; they were released to the Asian, European, and North American versions of PlayStation Home on March 11, 2010. The game was re-released as part of the Final Fantasy 25th Anniversary Ultimate Box Japanese package in December 2012. It was re-released again in November 2013, as part of the Lightning Ultimate box, a Japan exclusive edition which includes Final Fantasy XIII and its two sequels.

The game was released bundled with consoles in different regions. The game was bundled in Japan with a limited-edition white PlayStation 3 with a pink color print of Lightning on the surface of the console, and in North America with a limited-edition white Xbox 360 Elite (similar to the discontinued Pro models) with the silver strip on the hard drive emblazoned with the Final Fantasy XIII logo. A limited quantity of themed Xbox 360 faceplates created by Nomura were made available through a select few retailers in Europe, North America, and Australia. PAL territories received a limited collector's edition of the game for both Xbox 360 and PlayStation 3, with the Final Fantasy XIII Original Sound Selection "best of" soundtrack CD, three Eidolon art prints, a Brand of the l'Cie decal and The World of Final Fantasy XIII, a hardback book featuring character artwork, CG-rendered artwork, and environments from across the game production. Square Enix published three Ultimania books in 2010: the Final Fantasy XIII Scenario Ultimania and the Final Fantasy XIII Battle Ultimania on January 28, and the Final Fantasy XIII Ultimania Ω on September 30. The Battle Ultimania provides a description and analysis of the new battle system and its components, and developer interviews. The Scenario Ultimania describes the main scenarios in the game, profiles on the characters and areas in Cocoon and Gran Pulse, developer interviews, and details on each location. The last guide, the Ultimania Ω, includes voice actor and additional staff interviews, the complete story of Final Fantasy XIII including additional character profiles, a collection of artworks and illustrations, and additional dissections of the story and background.

While the game was introduced on both PlayStation 3 and Xbox 360 in western regions, the game was a PlayStation 3 exclusive in Asian territories. This was changed in late 2010 when Square Enix announced that the Xbox 360 version would in fact release in Japan, despite many statements to the opposite. It was later released for Windows via Steam, along with its two sequels. Final Fantasy XIII was the first game in the series to receive an official release in Chinese and Korean. This was the first edition of a Final Fantasy game in which Japanese voice-overs could be enabled. An international version of the game for the Xbox 360 called Final Fantasy XIII Ultimate Hits International was released in Asia on December 16, 2010. The game includes an "Easy" mode option, and features the English voices. It comes with a bonus booklet titled Final Fantasy XIII Corridor of Memory that contains content that was previously left out of the original version of the game and a short story epilogue titled Final Fantasy XIII Episode I.

Final Fantasy XIII was released for iOS and Android devices via cloud streaming in Japan on April 10, 2015. The game was added to Xbox One backward compatibility in November 2018 along with its sequels.

== Reception ==
Reception

Aggregate score
Aggregator	Score
Metacritic	PS3: 83/100; X360: 82/100; PC: 65/100

Review scores
Publication	Score
1Up.com	A−
Computer and Video Games	9.2/10
Edge	5/10
Eurogamer	8/10
Famitsu	39/40
Game Informer	9.25/10
GameSpot	8.5/10
GameSpy	4.5/5
IGN	8.9/10
PlayStation Official Magazine – UK	9/10
Play	7.9/10

Final Fantasy XIII received generally positive reviews. Review aggregator website Metacritic gave the PlayStation 3 version 83/100 based on 83 reviews, the Xbox 360 version 82/100 based on 54 reviews, and the Windows version 65/100 based on 6 reviews. It was rated 39 out of 40 by the Japanese gaming magazine Famitsu. Dengeki praised the game for the battle system, stating that the battles are by far the most exciting in the series, and concluded that Final Fantasy XIII deserved a score of 120, as 100 would not be enough.

Universal praise was given to the technical milestones achieved by the game's graphics and presentation. Edge felt that Cocoon in particular was an "inspired setting [...] blessed with a vibrancy and vivid colour that often leaves you open-mouthed". GameSpot called the art design "magnificent". Further praise was given to the pre-rendered animation sequences and the almost seamless transition of visual quality between these and the realtime gameplay. Many also appreciated the game's soundtrack, with Masashi Hamauzu providing "a score with catchy hooks and blood-pumping battle melodies", according to Wired.

The battle system of Final Fantasy XIII received widespread praise. The increased pace of battles was appreciated, with several reviews describing it as "thrilling"; Edge's description of the battle system summarized it as "among the genre's finest". 1UP.com said that "despite the fact that two-thirds of your party is AI-controlled, FFXIII's battles may be the most involving the series has ever seen". The story got a mixed reception, with Wired remarking that the plot was "a little more human and less esoteric than in previous games". 1UP.com felt that the story was "hardly world-class writing", but that the writers clearly knew the medium well and had attempted to avoid clichés. Reviewers felt that the characters worked well together, and that the interactions among them as the game progressed made up for shortcomings in the story.

=== Linearity ===
While critics generally praised Square Enix's attempt to revitalize the Final Fantasy series formula, many reacted negatively to the linear nature of the game, especially in the first ten chapters on Cocoon, an issue which many felt was compounded by the large reduction of towns, free-roaming capabilities, and interaction with non-player characters. GamePro described the gameplay as "a long hallway toward an orange target symbol on your mini-map that triggers a cutscene, a boss fight, or both", and 1UP.com criticized the linear aspect as the game's "biggest shortcoming", and felt the first section was "superficial". Edge and others awarded the game especially lower scores as a result of these aspects, with Edge in particular lowering the score they awarded the game to a five out of ten primarily due to the game's linear nature.

In contrast, reviewers from GamesRadar and Computer and Video Games appreciated the linear nature; the former opined that "the streamlined, focused structure eliminates potential tedium without dumbing anything down", while the latter felt it was "a clever move", and kept the player from being "[bogged] down with mundane number crunching, [and] finicky and repetitive leveling-up". Many negatively noted the gradual unfurling of the player's abilities over this first part of the game, from battle gameplay to selecting the party leader. Combined with the game's linear nature, some reviews went as far as to describe these chapters as "boring" until the world of Gran Pulse was revealed. Edge noted that while it did not do enough to make up for the opening chapters, at Gran Pulse the game "hits a sweet spot" as the narrative offers "hunting side-quests and the simple joy of exploring to see what visual marvel is around the next corner".

=== Response to criticism ===
After release, director Motomu Toriyama felt that the lower-than-expected review scores for a main Final Fantasy series game came from reviewers who approached the game from a Western point of view. These reviewers were used to games in which the player was given an open world to explore, he said, noting that this expectation contrasted with the vision the team set out to create. He noted that it "becomes very difficult to tell a compelling story when you're given that much freedom". Yoshinori Kitase said that they "didn't really intend to work within the RPG template", but "wanted to create a new game, even a new genre". He said that "in a lot of senses FFXIII is more like an FPS than an RPG".

Toriyama and Kitase later said, in July 2011, that the biggest complaints about the game were that it was too linear and that there was not enough interaction between the player and the world, which they described as a lack of towns and minigames compared to the previous Final Fantasy games. They also named the amount of time it took to access all of the gameplay elements as a common criticism, saying that people interpreted it as a "lengthy tutorial".

Yoichi Wada, then-president of Square Enix, made his thoughts about the reception of the game known to Gamasutra. He said that "some value it highly and some are not very happy with it", also adding: "Should Final Fantasy become a new type of game or should Final Fantasy not become a new type of game? The customers have different opinions. It's very difficult to determine which way it should go".

=== Windows port ===
Square Enix released a Windows port of the game in October 2014, where it was met with a more negative critical reception than the original versions. PC Gamer's Samuel Roberts, when reviewing the port, criticized not only the original gameplay, but heavily criticized the quality of the port itself, decrying the low resolution, limited graphical options and low framerate. He was especially critical of the time taken for the port given that an unofficial patch was produced by modder Peter Thoman within a day of release that fixed many of the issues. Michael McWhertor of Polygon also noted a similar critical response by consumers. A patch was released by Square Enix two months later in December, which was noted by Thoman as adding only the graphical features that his external patch had, with no other additions or performance improvements.

=== Sales ===
Final Fantasy XIII sold over one million units on its first day of sale in Japan, and had sold 1.7 million copies for the PlayStation 3 in Japan by the end of 2009, and 1.9 million by the end of 2010. Square Enix had anticipated high initial sales for the game and shipped close to two million units for its launch. The game sold more than one million copies in North America in its release month. In March 2010, XIII was the fastest-selling title in the franchise's history. By April of the same year, American game sales for the PlayStation 3 and Xbox 360 reached an estimated 800,000 and 500,000 units respectively. According to Media Create, female gamers accounted for nearly a third of the game's Japanese fanbase. As of July 2012, a combined total of 9.7 million units has been sold on consoles for both Final Fantasy XIII and its sequel XIII-2. As of January 2013, the game had sold 6.6 million copies worldwide. By September 2014, Final Fantasy XIII series was widely successful and has shipped over 11 million copies worldwide. As of 2017, the game has sold over 7 million copies worldwide on consoles. By April 2018, the Windows version has sold over 746,000 copies according to SteamSpy.

=== Awards ===
The game was voted as the second best game of 2009 in Dengeki Online's reader poll, and in January 2010, it was voted the best game ever in Famitsu's reader poll. The game received a Best RPG of the year award nomination at the Spike Video Game Awards, but lost to Mass Effect 2. It won the "Future Division" award at the Japan Game Awards 2009 and later won an "Award for Excellence" the Japan Game Awards 2010.

== Sequels ==
A direct sequel to Final Fantasy XIII, entitled Final Fantasy XIII-2, was in production by Square Enix, built on the game's story and characters while taking on board the criticism and other feedback about the original. It was released in December 2011 in Japan, followed by North America and Europe in January and February 2012 respectively, for both the PlayStation 3 and the Xbox 360. Motomu Toriyama and Yoshinori Kitase returned to their respective roles as director and producer. The game begins three years after the events of Final Fantasy XIII, and features Serah and newcomer Noel as the main protagonists. XIII-2 is the fifth sequel game in the Final Fantasy series, after Final Fantasy X-2, Dirge of Cerberus: Final Fantasy VII, Final Fantasy XII: Revenant Wings, and Final Fantasy IV: The After Years. Most of the team returned again to create a second sequel entitled Lightning Returns: Final Fantasy XIII, meant to wrap up the story of Lightning and the Final Fantasy XIII universe. The game was released in November 2013 in Japan and in February 2014 in North America and Europe. Toriyama said in the Ultimania Omega companion book prior to XIII-2's announcement that he hoped to write a story "where Lightning ends up happy", though at the time Square Enix had no plans to make a sequel.
