= Yoichi Wada =

Japanese businessman

- Born: May 28, 1959 (age 67); Nagoya, Aichi, Japan
- Education: University of Tokyo
- Occupation: Outside director of Metaps
- Board member of: Metaps

Yoichi Wada (和田 洋一, Wada Yōichi; Nagoya, May 28, 1959) is a former president and representative director of the Japanese video game and publishing company Square Enix as well as its subsidiary Taito. He is also the former chairman of the Computer Entertainment Supplier's Association (CESA), the former chairman of the Digital Content Use Promotion Conference, former president of Shinra Technologies and a former member of the Japanese Brand and Contents Council. He is a current outside director of Metaps.

== Personal life ==
Wada was born on May 28, 1959, in Nagoya, Aichi, Japan. As a teenager and young student, Wada was a fan of Pong, Space Invaders, Donkey Kong and Xevious. When he lived in Warsaw, he also enjoyed games from the Nobunaga's Ambition and Romance of the Three Kingdoms computer game series. Before joining Square, Wada has stated he was an "uneducated consumer", as he was a "big fan" of Final Fantasy but did not know that the company was responsible for the series. He particularly liked early 3D games, including D and titles from the Myst, Resident Evil and Metal Gear series. While CEO Wada proactively tried to play as many Western games as possible, including Uncharted 2: Among Thieves and Call of Duty: Modern Warfare 2, and provided comments about these games to Square Enix's staff.

== Career ==
=== Pre-Square years ===
As a student, Wada wanted to become the president of a company quickly, rather than gradually working his way up through his entire career. He set for himself the objective of becoming a president by the age of 40. After receiving a bachelor's degree in law from the University of Tokyo, he went through an apprenticeship in the financial services group and global investment bank Nomura Securities to build a track record of success. Starting in 1984, he served in the group as part of the corporate strategy division, the investment banking division, and the controller division. He also worked at the Ministry of Foreign Affairs of Japan in Warsaw, Poland. In 2000, he decided to join "a company with a 'theme'" and, thinking that one of the themes of the 21st century was "creating society", chose the video game company Square.

=== Square and Square Enix ===
Wada joined Square in April 2000. In June, he became an executive director and chief financial officer. In September 2001, he became a representative director and chief operating officer, and by December he became the president and chief executive officer. He helped reform the company's management system. When Square merged with Enix, he continued to serve as the new company's president and representative director. Under his presidency, Square Enix acquired the video game companies Taito in 2005 and the British video game publisher Eidos Interactive in 2009. Wada also became the president and representative director of Taito following the subsidiary's restructuring in July 2006. Wada stated at the time that consolidation was a "part of [his] plan" since 2000, as he had foreseen "the first phase of a major reformation of the industry" and had concluded that "there was a limit to what [Square Enix] could do with the wholly independent business culture [the company] worked within". On March 26, 2013, Yoichi Wada announced his resignation as CEO of Square Enix and that former company director Yosuke Matsuda would replace him. The company planned the change to go into effect in June 2013.

Square Enix revealed that Wada resigned from his post in May 2013 and in June 2013 took up a new position as Chairman of the Board of Square Enix Co., Ltd. However, he did not hold the “right of representation” for the company. On June 16, 2015, Wada left Square Enix after the end of his contractual term.

=== Other positions ===
Wada became the chairman of the Computer Entertainment Supplier's Association (CESA) in May 2006. The association aims to promote the computer entertainment industry through research activities and exhibitions, including the annual Tokyo Game Show. In March 2012, it was announced that he would step down from his position at CESA in May 2012. Namco Bandai's Vice President Shin Unozawa replaced him. He had also held the Chairmanship of the Digital Content Use Promotion Conference of the Keidanren and was a Japanese Brand and Contents Council member.

In September 2014, Square Enix announced the establishment of Shinra Technologies, an autonomous subsidiary offering cloud-based gaming services. Wada acted as its founder and president. In an interview with GameSpot in March 2015, Wada said the companies' goal was to offer the cloud-based gaming service as a platform with new and exclusive content instead of pre-existing content like other services. He also said that their cloud-based gaming service would utilize supercomputers, allowing developers to create higher quality games than what is possible for modern consoles and personal computers. On May 11, 2015, Metaps, an application analysis and marketing company, announced that Wada had joined their company as an outside director. On January 6, 2016, Square Enix announced that they would be dissolving Shinra Technologies due to a lack of investment.

== Views on the industry ==
=== Final Fantasy ===
In January 2010, Wada, asked about his opinion on "big-budget, long-in-development" Square Enix games such as Final Fantasy XIII, noted: "[W]hether we are going to continue to internally create this type of game remains to be seen, because I actually feel that the team that was involved with Final Fantasy XIII should next move on to create and generate some 'next generation' forms of play. Internally and externally I feel there's an expectation of Square Enix to offer something new, and I really think that the Final Fantasy team could create something completely different, but at the moment they're strictly catering to the particular audience they have now."

=== Piracy ===
Wada has stated that video game piracy significantly damages the video game industry, especially in Japan, with R4 cards for the Nintendo DS. Japan banned R4 after Nintendo, Square Enix, and Capcom brought the issue to court in 2009. Wada proposed that the best strategy to combat this involved personalized saves and a social community built around gaming to help players understand the product's value.

=== Online distribution ===
In November 2009, Wada stated: "In ten years' time, a lot of what we call 'console games' won't exist". According to him, the primary strategy of console manufacturers has switched from hardware to network starting in 2005, with any computer becoming a potential gaming platform. He claimed that sales firms and distributors were in for economic troubles, but “format holders” such as Sony and Microsoft were already prepared. Square Enix increased its production of social and browser games during this period as a result, though Wada restated his commitment to console gaming and the Final Fantasy series in particular.
