= Riot on the Grill =

Studio album by Ellegarden
- Released: April 20, 2005
- Genre: Punk rock
- Length: 30:10
- Label: Dynamord

Ellegarden chronology
Pepperoni Quattro (2004)	Riot on the Grill (2005)	Eleven Fire Crackers (2006)

Professional ratings
Review scores
Source	Rating
AllMusic	3.5/5 stars

Riot on the Grill is the fourth full-length album by the Japanese music group Ellegarden. It was released on April 20, 2005.

== Track listing ==
1. Red Hot - 2:54
2. Monster (モンスター) - 3:18
3. Snake Fighting - 2:47
4. Marry Me - 2:49
5. Missing - 3:27
6. Bored of Everything - 3:21
7. TV Maniacs - 2:50
8. Niji (虹, Rainbow) - 3:27
9. I Hate It - 3:11
10. BBQ Riot Song - 2:06

== Charts ==
Chart (2005)	Peak position
Japanese Albums (Oricon)	3
