= Don't Trust Anyone But Us =

Studio album by Ellegarden
- Released: April 3, 2002
- Genre: Punk
- Length: 70:32
- Label: Dynamord

Ellegarden chronology
My Own Destruction (2002)	Don't Trust Anyone But Us (2002)	Bring Your Board!! (2003)

Don't Trust Anyone But Us is the first full-length album released by Ellegarden on April 3, 2002.

== Track listing ==
1. My Favorite Song - 3:42
2. Santa Claus (サンタクロース) - 3:59
3. Can You Feel Like I Do - 4:47
4. Bare Foot - 3:47
5. Yubiwa (指輪, Ring) - 4:19
6. Tsuki (月, Moon) - 2:57
7. 45 - 4:35
8. Kaze no Hi (風の日, Windy Day) - 4:12
9. Middle of Nowhere - 3:52
10. Lonesome - 5:04
11. Sliding Door - 2:51
12. The End of the World -Album Mix- - 4:03

== Charts ==
Chart (2002)	Peak position
Japanese Albums (Oricon)	94
