= My Own Destruction =

Studio album by Ellegarden
- Released: October 16, 2002
- Genre: Rock
- Length: 22:16
- Label: Dynamord

Ellegarden chronology
Ellegarden (2001)	My Own Destruction (2002)	Don't Trust Anyone But Us (2002)

My Own Destruction is the second EP album by the Japanese music group Ellegarden. It was released on October 16, 2002.

== Track listing ==
1. (Can't Remember) How We Used to Be - 3:16
2. Under Control - 3:21
3. Migite (右手, Right Hand) - 4:27
4. Mouse Molding - 3:03
5. Jamie - 3:58
6. Oyasumi (お休み, Good Night) - 4:11

== Charts ==
Chart (2002)	Peak position
Japanese Albums (Oricon)	206
