= The Sxplay =

Japanese singer (born 1990)

Sayuri Sugawara 菅原紗由理
- Also known as: THE SxPLAY
- Born: Sayuri Sugawara; June 29, 1990 (age 36); Yokote, Akita, Japan
- Origin: Tokyo, Japan
- Genre: Pop
- Occupation: Singer
- Instrument: Vocals
- Years active: 2008–present
- Label: For Life Music (2008–2013)
- Website: thesplay.jp

Sayuri Sugawara (菅原 紗由理, Sugawara Sayuri; born June 29, 1990 in Yokote, Akita), also known by the name THE SxPLAY, is a Japanese singer. She debuted as a musician in 2009, and sang "Kimi ga Iru Kara," the theme song for the Japanese version of Final Fantasy XIII.

== Biography ==
In January 2008, Sayuri Sugawara participated in the "7 Days Audition" and the "30 Days Audition". She won both auditions and received a contract with For Life Music Entertainment

Following the digital success of her debut song, Sugawara released her debut single, "Ano Hi no Yakusoku" on September 30, 2009. On September 3, 2009, at the Final Fantasy XIII premiere, it was announced that she would perform its theme song, "Kimi ga Iru Kara". Composed by Masashi Hamauzu, Sugawara performed the song with a live orchestral accompaniment at the premiere. A single for Kimi ga Iru Kara was released on December 2, two weeks before the release date of Final Fantasy XIII.

Her first album, First Story, was released on January 27, 2010. And peaked at number 14 on the Oricon charts, selling 10,217 copies. Sugawara's third single, "Sunao ni Narenakute", released May 19, 2010 was used as the insert song for the drama of the same title, Sunao ni Narenakute, starring Eita and Juri Ueno. Also on September 1, 2010, Sugawara's fourth single, "Suki to Iu Kotoba", was used as the theme song to the 2010 version of the drama Kasoken no Onna. On October 16 and 24, Sugawara held her first live tour at Shinsaibashi and Shibuya Club Quattro titled "Sugawara Sayuri Live Tour – The One". And also held school festival live tours in November at Toho, Kitasato and Momoyama Universities.

Sugawara released her second album, Open the Gate, on November 14, 2010.

On February 2, 2014, Sugawara revealed that she had cut ties with For Life Music and was now performing as an indie singer. On March 30, 2014, she revealed her new stage name, THE SxPLAY. She released her first independent extended play Call to Action on May 28, 2014.

In September 2016, the track "Mikansei-Canvas", off of her EP "Butterfly Effect", was chosen to be the theme song for the 2016–17 edition of the Paralym Art World Cup. Her track "Boku wa Robot Goshi no Kimi ni Koi wo Suru", was used as the theme song for the anime of the same name.

She married an unnamed individual on December 10, 2020.

Her songs, "Kimi ga Nokoshita Sekai de", "Guardian", "Haname", and "Lycoris" are all featured in the game Deemo.

== Discography ==
=== Albums ===
| Title | Release date |
|---|---|
| First Story | January 27, 2010 |
| Open The Gate | November 14, 2012 |
| Memento | December 5, 2018 |

=== Extended plays ===
| Title | Release date |
|---|---|
| Close To You | December 22, 2010 |
| Forever... | July 20, 2011 |
| Call to Action | May 28, 2014 |
| Butterfly Effect | November 25, 2015 |

=== Singles ===
| Title | Release date |
|---|---|
| "Ano Hi no Yakusoku" (あの日の約束; "The Promise on That Day") | September 30, 2009 |
| "Kimi ga Iru Kara" (君がいるから; "Because You're Here") | December 2, 2009 |
| "Sunao Ni Narenakute" (素直になれなくて; "I Can't Be Honest") | May 19, 2010 |
| ""Suki" to Iu Kotoba" (『好き』という言葉; "The Word Called "Love" ") | September 1, 2010 |
| "Asu ni Naru Mae ni" (明日になる前に; "Before Tomorrow") | December 7, 2011 |
| "Habataku Kimi e" (はばたくキミへ) | March 28, 2012 |
| "Kimi ga Nokoshita Sekai de / Guardian " (キミが残した世界で / Guardian) | December 14, 2012 |
| "Boku wa Robot Goshi no Kimi ni Koi wo Suru" (僕はロボットごしの君に恋をする) | November 3, 2017 |
| MOTHER | May 9, 2018 |
| "Watashi Dake no Iris" (わたしだけのアイリス) | June 27, 2018 |
| "Sweet Outsider" (スウィートアウトサイダー) | July 25, 2018 |
| "Kobanzame" (コバンザメ) | August 29, 2018 |
| "For Kimi ni Okuru Uta" (For キミに贈る歌) | September 26, 2018 |
| "Hyouryuu" (漂流, "Drifting") | October 9, 2019 |
| "Haname" (花雨, "Flower Rain") | March 30, 2022 |
| Lycoris | May 25, 2022 |

=== Digital downloads ===
| Title | Release date |
|---|---|
| Destiny feat. Feros | December 17, 2008 |
| Living Rock | April 30, 2014 |

=== Collaborations/compilations ===
| Title | Release date |
|---|---|
| Final Fantasy XIII Original Soundtrack | January 27, 2010 |
| "Miss Monday - Sayonara feat. Sayuri Sugawara" (さよなら feat. 菅原紗由理; "Goodbye feat. Sayuri Sugawara") | March 24, 2010 |
| Miss Monday – Beautiful | June 23, 2010 |
| KG – Dare Yori mo duet with Sugawara Sayuri | June 30, 2010 |
| YUKI JOLLY ROGER of BK Project – "After The Storm / THE SxPLAY" | February 23, 2015 |
| BEST OF 3650 DAYS (compilation of songs as both "Sugawara Sayuri" and "THE SxPLAY" | April 8, 2020 |
