= Eleven Fire Crackers =

Studio album by Ellegarden
- Released: November 8, 2006 (JP); July 31, 2007 (US)
- Genre: Punk rock
- Length: 32:03
- Label: Dynamord/Growing Up (JP); Nettwerk (US)

Ellegarden chronology
Riot on the Grill (2005)	Eleven Fire Crackers (2006)	Figureheads Compilation (2007)

Professional ratings
Review scores
Source	Rating
AllMusic	4/5 stars

Eleven Fire Crackers is the fifth full-length album released by the Japanese rock band Ellegarden. It was released in Japan on November 8, 2006, and in the United States on July 31, 2007, under the Nettwerk label.

== Track listing ==
1. Opening – 0:40
2. Fire Cracker – 3:16
3. Space Sonic – 3:29
4. Acropolis – 3:05
5. Winter – 3:08
6. Gunpowder Valentine – 2:53
7. Ash (アッシュ) – 3:06
8. Salamander – 3:47
9. Koukasen (高架線, Elevated) – 2:25
10. Alternative Plans – 3:21
11. Marie – 3:27

== Charts ==
Chart (2006)	Peak position
Japanese Albums (Oricon)	1
