= Pepperoni Quattro =

Studio album by Ellegarden
- Released: May 26, 2004
- Genre: Punk rock
- Length: 31:18
- Label: Dynamord

Ellegarden chronology
Bring Your Board!! (2003)	Pepperoni Quattro (2004)	Riot on the Grill (2005)

Pepperoni Quattro is the third full-length album released by the Japanese music group Ellegarden. It was released on May 26, 2004.

== Track listing ==
1. Supernova - 3:45
2. Starfish (スターフィッシュ) - 3:41
3. Make a Wish - 2:18
4. Addicted - 3:16
5. Butterfly (バタフライ) - 3:10
6. My Bloody Holiday - 2:36
7. Pizza Man - 2:09
8. Lost World (ロストワールド) - 3:17
9. Perfect Days - 3:26
10. Good Morning Kids - 3:40

== Charts ==
Chart (2004)	Peak position
Japanese Albums (Oricon)	17
