= Hirohisa Horie =

Japanese keyboardist and guitarist

- Born: March 24, 1970 (age 56)
- Origin: Kanagawa Prefecture, Japan
- Occupations: Music producer, musician
- Instruments: Keyboard, piano, guitar
- Years active: 1995–present
- Label: Escalator Records
- Website: Escalator Records

Hirohisa Horie (堀江博久, Horie Hirohisa; born March 24, 1970, in Kanagawa, Kantō region) is a Japanese musician and multi-instrumentalist. He plays primarily keyboards and guitar. Horie is one half of the Shibuya-kei duo Neil & Iraiza, and is known for his work with artists such as Kahimi Karie and Cornelius (as a member of the Cornelius Group).

== Biography ==
While a student of Tama Art University, Horie participated in many musicians' live performances and in recording sessions as a session keyboardist.

Horie has been very active as a musician, having performed and/or recorded with Japanese and international artists including Acrobat Bunche, American Rock, Billy No Mates, Chocolat, Cocco, Cubismo Grafico, Curly Giraffe, El-Malo, Freedom Suite, Great3, Hideki Kaji, Kaela Kimura, Kahimi Karie, Love Psychedelico, Master Low, Pizzicato Five, Plagues, Quruli, Snapshot, Studio Apes, and many others.

Horie has been a long-time collaborator with Keigo Oyamada (Cornelius), performing live as a member of his Cornelius Group. The two have worked together for over 15 years, since the time that Oyamada still presided over his record label Trattoria Records.

In 1995, Horie formed Neil & Iraiza with Gakuji Matsuda, serving as a vocalist and the group’s keyboardist.

In 2005, Horie formed Singer Songer with Shigeru Kishida of Quruli, Cocco and others, releasing one single and one album.

In the summer of 2007, Horie was invited by Yukihiro Takahashi of Yellow Magic Orchestra to form the pop electronica band pupa.

Horie is a member of the band the Hiatus. In 2009, he joined the group as its keyboardist. He produced all the group’s songs in collaboration with Takeshi Hosomi, the former lead vocalist of Ellegarden, and performed with the band live at concerts and festivals.

He is featured on the song "One Thousand 20th Century Chairs" from Kahimi Karie's album K.K.K.K.K..

== Discography ==
American Rock

- Light in the Darkness (1997)

Billy No Mates

- C'monletmeseeyoupogo (2006)

Chocolat

- À la Mode (1997)
- Twinkle Starberry (1998)
- One Too Many (1998)
- Hamster (1999)

Cocco

- Cocco-san no Daidokoro CD (2009, produce)

Cornelius

- 69/96 (1995)

Cubismo Grafico

- Untitled (But One Wish) (2002)

Hideki Kaji

- Muscat E.P. (1996)
- Mini Skirt (1997)
- Eggstone (Single Version) (1997)
- Koibito ga Matteiru (1997)
- August E.P. (1998)
- Tea (1999)
- 15 Angry Men (1999)
- Ivy Ivory Ivy (2000)
- My Love, My Milk (2001)
- From Café Scandinavia With Love~For Café Après Midi (2001)
- Separate Ways (2001)

Kahimi Karie

- K.K.K.K.K. (1998)

Neil & Iraiza

- I ♥ NY (1996)
- Je suis ému E.P. (1997)
- Johnny Marr? (1997)
- Juillet (1999)
- Wasted Time (2000)
- New School (2002)

Pizzicato Five

- Romantique 96 (1995)
- Sister Freedom Tapes (1997)
- Pizzicato Five (1999)

pupa

- floating pupa (2008)

Singer Songer

- Barairo Pop (2005)

Snapshot

- Icerink (1996)

The Hiatus

- Trash We'd Love (2009, produce)
