= Ellegarden =

Japanese rock band

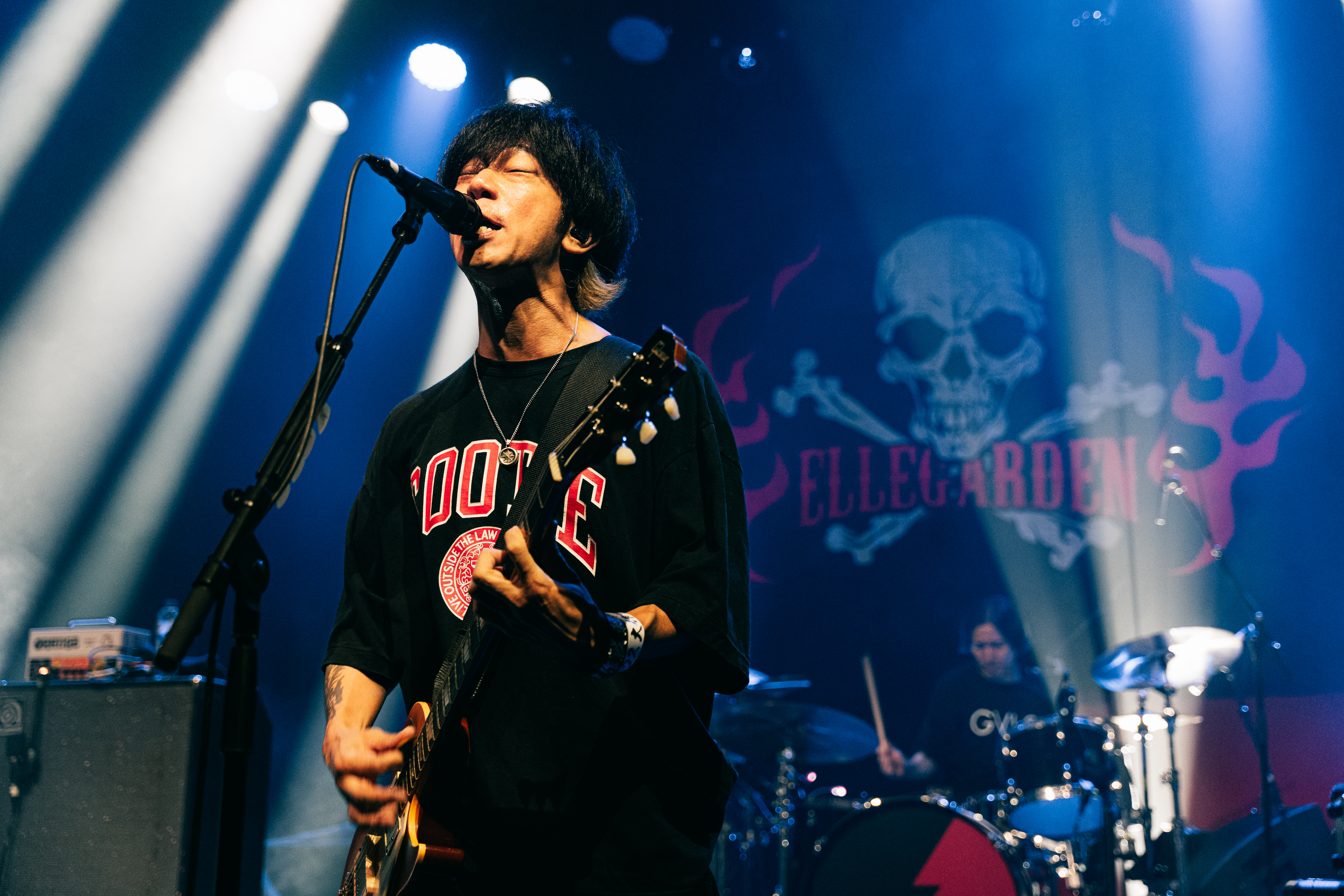
- Takeshi Hosomi performing with Ellegarden at Koko in London, 2025

Background information
- Origin: Ichikawa, Chiba, Japan
- Genres: Pop-punk; punk rock; alternative rock
- Years active: 1998–2008, 2018–present
- Labels: Dynamord; Growing Up; Denka Secca; Nettwerk; EMI
- Members: Takeshi Hosomi; Shinichi Ubukata; Yuichi Takada; Hirotaka Takahashi
- Website: ellegarden.jp

Ellegarden (stylized as ELLEGARDEN and abbreviated Elle (Japanese: エルレ, Hepburn: Erure)) is a Japanese rock band formed in December 1998 in Chiba Prefecture. Its lineup consists of vocalist/guitarist Takeshi Hosomi, guitarist Shinichi Ubukata, bassist Yuichi Takada, and drummer Hirotaka Takahashi. After releasing five studio albums, including the Oricon number one Eleven Fire Crackers (2006), the band announced an indefinite hiatus in 2008. In May 2018, Ellegarden announced a reunion and held their first national tour in 10 years.

== History ==
"Jitterbug"
"Jitterbug" is the third maxi single from the band.

"Supernova"
"Supernova" is the song from their album Pepperoni Quattro.

In the fall of 2001, Ellegarden signed with the Japanese Dynamord label, and released their first EP, Bare Foot, with a full-length album, Don't Trust Anyone But Us, following in the spring of 2002. The album was a hit, and Ellegarden followed with a new LP every year. In 2004, they took part in the Synchronized Rockers tribute album to The Pillows. 2006's Eleven Fire Crackers became the band's first to reach number one on the Oricon Albums Chart. It also became their first North American release when it was issued by Nettwerk in 2007. Accustomed to playing major shows in Japan, where they shared stages with the Foo Fighters and Sum 41, Ellegarden made their American live debut in 2006 with a seven-city tour as part of Japan Nite, which included a stop at the South by Southwest Music Conference.

In 2006, Ellegarden performed in numerous Japanese Summer Music Festivals, such as Fuji Rock, Summer Sonic, Nano Mugen Festival and Rising Sun Rock Festival. Their final tour of the year featured the American band Allister, who they became acquainted with during South by Southwest. In addition, they supported Foo Fighters in their concert at Osaka Castle Hall.

On May 2, 2008, the band announced they would be going on hiatus with a message on their official website:

"Ellegarden has been in the process of creating a new album since last year, however, during the band’s activities, there arose a difference in opinion regarding the motivation for creating a new album. We no longer feel we are able to create an album that we would be satisfied with, and after much discussion we arrived at the conclusion to end the creation of the album and suspend the band’s activities indefinitely. All previously decided shows (including shows not yet announced) up until early September 2008 will still be performed.

We want to thank everyone who has supported Ellegarden from the bottom of our hearts. In order to once again create new music as Ellegarden, each of us wants to work on our own personal growth and development. Thank you for everything." – Ellegarden leader, Shinichi Ubukata

Following the recording hiatus announcement, the band has continued to perform live and announced a greatest hits album entitled Ellegarden Best (1999-2008). The album consists of 21 songs and was released on July 2, 2008. After appearances at several high-profile festivals (including Rock in Japan Fest, Sky Jamboree, Nano Mugen Fes, and Treasure 05x: The Greatest Riot Returns), the band performed four one-man shows in early September to give its fans a send-off before the hiatus; two performances at Zepp Osaka followed by two performances at Shinkiba Studio Coast in Tokyo.

In 2018, Ellegarden announced their first tour in 10 years, ending their hiatus. The tour, titled The Boys are Back in Town, kicked off in August 2018 at Shinkiba Studio Coast, the same venue as their send-off concert. In 2020, the group had announced scheduled performances at several music festivals in Japan, but most of them had been cancelled or postponed due to effects of the COVID-19 pandemic.

In September 2022, Ellegarden released the single "Mountain Top". In December 2022, they released their first full-length album in 16 years, The End of Yesterday.

On August 10, 2025, Ellegarden released the song "Carmine", which was used as the 28th opening of the One Piece anime.

== Musical style ==
Mark Deming of AllMusic found Ellegarden's "tight, punchy but muscular sound" reminiscent of North American bands such as Blink-182, Sum 41 and Good Charlotte, while also displaying the influence of Hosomi's favorites, Weezer. Their lyrics are in Japanese and English. In the Summer 2006 issue of the American Japanese rock magazine Purple Sky, Hosomi accredited his articulate English pronunciation to the time he spent working as a computer engineer in Oakland, California and later in Japan, where he had English-speaking co-workers.

== Band members ==
- Takeshi Hosomi (細美 武士, Hosomi Takeshi) – lead vocals, rhythm guitarist
  - Hosomi is the main songwriter and writes almost all the lyrics and music.
  - In 2008, he became active as a solo artist and formed the band The Hiatus.
- Shinichi Ubukata (生形 真一, Ubukata Shin’ichi) – lead guitarist, backing vocals
  - Ubukata is the leader of Ellegarden.
  - He formed the band Nothing's Carved in Stone in 2009.
- Yuichi Takada (高田 雄一, Takada Yuichi) – bassist, backing vocals
  - Takada is also a member of the bands Meaning and the End, the latter with former BiS member Yukiko "UK" Nakayama.
- Hirotaka Takahashi (高橋 宏貴, Takahashi Hirotaka) – drummer, backing vocals
  - Takahashi formed the band Scars Borough in 2009 and joined The Predators in 2010.

== Equipment ==
- Takeshi Hosomi (lead vocals & rhythm guitar)
  - Gibson Les Paul Std./ Gibson Historic Collection 1956 Les Paul Gold Top
  - Diezel Herbert/ Marshall JCM-800
- Shinichi Ubukata (lead guitar & chorus)
  - Gibson ES-355 (with no Varitone control)/Gibson Shinichi Ubukata ES-355.
  - VHT. Pittbull Hundred CLX/ Marshall JMP 2203
- Yuichi Takada (bass & chorus)
  - Fender Precision Bass/ Ampeg SVT-810 E
- Hirotaka Takahashi (drums & chorus)
  - Ludwig Classic Maple Drum Set/ SD Gretsch G4160
  - Paiste 2002 Series/ Stick Pearl Standard Hickory 190 STH

== Discography ==
Ellegarden discography
- Studio albums: 6
- Extended plays: 2
- Compilation albums: 2
- Singles: 6
- Video albums: 7

=== Studio albums ===
Title	Album details	Peak chart positions	Sales
Title	Album details	JPN Oricon	Sales
Don't Trust Anyone But Us	Released: April 3, 2002; Label: Dynamord	94	
Bring Your Board!!	Released: July 2, 2003; Label: Dynamord	75	
Pepperoni Quattro	Released: May 26, 2004; Label: Dynamord	17	
Riot on the Grill	Released: April 20, 2005; Label: Dynamord	3	227,000
Eleven Fire Crackers	Released: November 8, 2006; Label: Dynamord	1	341,000
The End of Yesterday	Released: December 21, 2022; Label: EMI	2	53,898

=== Compilation albums ===
Title	Album details	Peak chart positions	Sales
Title	Album details	JPN Oricon	Sales
Figureheads Compilation	Released: July 31, 2007; Label: Dynamord	—	
Ellegarden Best (1999–2008)	Released: July 2, 2008; Label: Dynamord	2	277,886
"—" denotes a recording that did not chart or was not released in that territory.

=== EPs ===
Title	Album details	Peak chart positions
Title	Album details	JPN Oricon
Ellegarden	Released: May 23, 2001; Label: Dynamord	240
My Own Destruction	Released: October 16, 2002; Label: Dynamord	206

=== Singles ===
Title	Year	Peak chart positions	Album
Title	Year	JPN Oricon	Album
"Bare Foot"	2001	—	Don't Trust Anyone But Us
"Yubiwa"	2002	—	Don't Trust Anyone But Us
"Jitterbug"	2003	75	Bring Your Board!!
"Missing"	2004	16	Riot on the Grill
"Space Sonic"	2005	5	Eleven Fire Crackers
"Salamander"	2006	3	Eleven Fire Crackers
"—" denotes a recording that did not chart or was not released in that territory.

=== Videos ===
Title	Details	Peak chart positions
Title	Details	JPN Oricon
My Own Destruction Tour Bootleg VHS	Released: March 20, 2003	—
Bring Your Board!! Tour Bootleg II DVD	Released: May 26, 2004	—
E.V.Junkie Lives 2004 – King of Punk Adventure	Released: November 17, 2004	—
Bad for Education Tour Bootleg III DVD	Released: February 26, 2005	17
Doggy Bags	Released: August 9, 2006	3
Eleven Fire Crackers Tour 06-07 – After Party	Released: October 24, 2007	1
Nana-Iro Electric Tour 2019 (with Asian Kung-Fu Generation and Straightener)	Released: August 5, 2020	3
Sonic Bridges Tour 2025 (with Feeder)	Released: August 5, 2026	TBA
"—" denotes a recording that did not chart or was not released in that territory.

=== Other appearances ===
Year	Song	Released on	Original artist
2004	"Funny Bunny"	Synchronized Rockers	The Pillows

== Tours ==
Dates shown are announcement dates

- First tour (August 2002) – 20 stop tour through Japan
- My Own Destruction Tour (October 16, 2002) – 30 stops in Japan to promote album of same name
- Bring Your Board!! Tour (July 10, 2003) – 25 stops in Japan with one extra live performance
- Jitterbug Live Tour (November 12, 2003)
- Pepperoni Quattro Tour (June 12, 2004) – toured 19 cities in Japan
- Bad for Education Tour 2004 (November 2, 2004) – 15 cities
- Riot on the Grill Tour (May 5, 2005) – 39 stops
- Space Sonic Tour 2005–2006 (December 3, 2005) – 36 stops
- Japan Nite Tour 2006 (January 16, 2006) – first US tour with appearance at SXSW followed by 7 cities
- Ellegarden Tour 2006–2007 (October 12, 2006) – 54 stops, first half featuring Allister
- Supporting act for Foo Fighters (December 5, 2006) – Osaka Castle Hall
- Ellegarden Tour 2007 (June 10, 2007) – 31 stops in Japan
- First Korean show at Melon AX (October 7, 2007)
- The Boys are Back in Town Tour 2018 (May 10, 2018) – 3 stops in Japan to promote return, guest act One Ok Rock
- Nana-Iro Electric Tour 2019 – 3 stop reunion tour with Asian Kung-Fu Generation and Straightener
- Sonic Bridges Tour 2025 – 10 stop co-headline tour with Feeder
