= For Life Music =

Music label from Japan

- Founded: 1975
- Founder: Yōsui Inoue, Takuro Yoshida, Shigeru Izumiya
- Status: Active
- Distributors: BMG Japan (2002–2005, 2008–2009); Pony Canyon (2005–2008); Sony Marketing (2009–2019); Sony Music Solutions (2019–present)
- Genre: Pop, rock
- Country of origin: Japan
- Location: Shibuya, Tokyo
- Official website: www.forlife.co.jp

For Life Music Entertainment Inc. (株式会社フォーライフミュージックエンタテイメント, Kabushiki Gaisha Foraifu Myūjikku Entateinmento) is a Japanese record label founded in 1975.

== Sub-divisions ==
- Güt Records
- Anri
- Loversoul Music & Associates

== Artists ==
Its artists include Yōsui Inoue, Abe Fuyumi, Takuro Yoshida, Shigeru Izumiya, Under Graph, Utaibito Hane, Yōsuke Eguchi, Double, The Hiatus, Tomoyo Harada, Shinji Harada, Yo Hitoto, Yann Tomita, Doopees, Bennie K, Chihiro Onitsuka, Miss Monday, Sayuri Sugawara and Glay.

== See also ==
- List of record labels
