= Tōjin Makyō Den: Hercules no Eikō =

1987 video game

- Box art
- Developer: Data East
- Publisher: Data East
- Platform: Family Computer
- Release: JP: June 12, 1987
- Genre: Role-playing
- Mode: Single-player

Tōjin Makyō Den: Hercules no Eikō (Note: Japanese: 闘人魔境伝 ヘラクレスの栄光, Hepburn: Tōjin Makyō Den: Hercules no Eikō) is a 1987 role-playing video game developed and published by Data East for the Family Computer. It is the first game of the Glory of Heracles series. It was one in numerous games that was acquired by Paon DP after Data East went bankrupt.

Hamster Corporation released the game outside Japan for the first time as part of their Console Archives series for the Nintendo Switch 2 and PlayStation 5 in May 2026.

== Gameplay ==
The player takes the role of a young Hercules who seeks to rescue Venus from captivity in Hades. The game's events are loosely based around The Twelve Labors of Hercules, and the game's bosses are designed in accordance with the content of each labor. Hercules must take part in turn-based combat against land-based, air-based or sea-based enemies with his various weapons. Land-based enemies are weak against sword, axe, and hammer attacks, air-based enemies are vulnerable to bow attacks, and sea-based enemies are weak against spear attacks. Certain weapons like the sword require only one hand to use, but others require two free hands in order to be used. Two-handed weapons cause more damage, but prevent Hercules from using a shield, also increasing the amount of damage received from enemies.

All armor and weaponry are assigned a specific endurance value, and the endurance value for a weapon decreases each time it is used, while the value for a piece of armor decreases each time it blocks an enemy attack. The item will break when this value reaches zero, and is removed from the player's inventory. The player can restore an item's endurance by taking it to the blacksmith Hephaestus. A payment of 5000G allows the player to employ Hephaestus and have him accompany Hercules (Hephaestus's presence is displayed as an inventory item). The endurance of weapons and armor is automatically restored to the maximum value after each battle if the player has employed Hephaestus.
