= Hercules no Eikō II: Titan no Metsubō =

1989 video game

- Box art
- Developer: Data East
- Publisher: Data East
- Writer: Kazushige Nojima
- Composer: Shōgo Sakai
- Platform: Family Computer
- Release: JP: December 23, 1989
- Genre: Role-playing
- Mode: Single-player

Hercules no Eikō II: Titan no Metsubō (Note: Japanese: ヘラクレスの栄光II タイタンの滅亡, Hepburn: Hercules no Eikō II: Titan no Metsubō; lit. "The Glory of Hercules II: Destruction of the Titans") is a 1989 role-playing video game developed and published by Data East for the Family Computer. It is the second game of the Glory of Heracles series. It was one in numerous games that was acquired by Paon DP after Data East went bankrupt. It is noted for its tragic and dramatic storyline written by Kazushige Nojima, who would later be known for his work in Square Enix's Final Fantasy series.

Though the game is set to take place directly after the events of the original Hercules no Eikō, the game's plot creates several inconsistencies in the series timeline. The portable spinoff, Hercules no Eikō: Ugokidashita Kamigami, was released in 1992 to fill the gap between the two games.

Hamster Corporation released the game outside Japan for the first time as part of their Console Archives series for the Nintendo Switch 2 and PlayStation 5 in July 2026.

== Gameplay ==
Unlike the first game in the series, Hercules is no longer the player-controlled character. Instead, the player takes the role of a young boy living in an age where Hercules is already recognized as a legendary hero. The boy learns that the last-remaining offspring of the Titans has crowned himself the king of darkness, causing chaos across the world, and sets off on a journey to defeat the evil king. The party system is newly introduced into the series, along with time-flow, where the game passes between daytime and nighttime. Most of the characteristics from the original Hercules no Eikō were scrapped, and a basic game system used for many RPGs of the time period was employed in their stead. Though no longer containing a particularly unique game system, Hercules no Eikō II is characterized by its tragic, dramatic storyline, which employs various motifs from Greek mythology. All subsequent releases in the series follow the basic format established in this game.

== Characters ==
Hero
The player-controlled character is given no default name. While living with his aunt in a small village, he is summoned by the queen to undertake the battle against the Titans, and leaves his loved ones behind to begin his long journey.
Centaurus
This character is a young centaur being harassed by a gang of unruly children. He decides to accompany the hero along his journey to find the god of courage.
Bronze goddess statue
This character is a statue created by the god Hephaestus. It accompanies the hero in order to receive a soul from its creator.
Hercules
The game's title character and legendary hero of Greek mythology. He is in the midst of a bitter battle against Talos as the main character begins his journey.
Homeros
Modeled after the poet Homer, this enigmatic character appears before the hero at various points in the game to provide information about the on-goings of the world.
