= Lulu (Final Fantasy) =

- Final Fantasy character
- Lulu in Final Fantasy X, as illustrated by Tetsuya Nomura.
- First game: Final Fantasy X (2001)
- Designed by: Tetsuya Nomura
- Voiced by: EN: Paula Tiso; JA: Rio Natsuki
- Motion capture: Yoko Yoshida
- Portrayed by: Nakamura Baishi

In-universe information
- Class: Black Mage
- Weapon: Stuffed animals
- Home: Besaid

Lulu (Japanese: ルールー, Hepburn: Rūrū) is a character from Square Enix's Final Fantasy series, and one of the main playable characters of the 2001 role-playing video game Final Fantasy X. She acts as a guardian to the game's protagonist Yuna, and accompanies her on a mission to defeat the creature Sin. As a Black Mage, Lulu represents a recurring character class in the Final Fantasy franchise, and fights using offensive magic spells or by animating small stuffed animals that strike on her behalf. Lulu was designed by series artist Tetsuya Nomura, who wanted to create a character that differed in appearance from other Black Mages in the franchise. Accordingly, her outfit took advantage of the PlayStation 2's improved graphics: it features an intricate dress that utilizes several belts in its skirt. Lulu later appears as a side character in Final Fantasy X-2, where she is shown to have had a child. In the original Japanese version she is voiced by Rio Natsuki, while in the English dub she is voiced by Paula Tiso.

Lulu has received mostly positive reception since her debut. She has been a popular character with Final Fantasy fans and cosplay enthusiasts in particular, while media outlets have recognized her attractiveness and sex appeal. However, Lulu was also criticized by certain reviewers who associated her design with sadomasochistic imagery and fetish culture. Her personality and role in the storyline received greater praise from critics who saw her as the most level-headed figure among the playable cast and one of the better-voiced characters in Final Fantasy X. Other outlets enjoyed the evolution of her character arc and her motherly demeanor.

== Conception and design ==
Lulu was designed by Tetsuya Nomura for Final Fantasy X. She is classified as a Black Mage, a type of spellcaster in the Final Fantasy franchise that specializes in the use of offensive magic. Nomura wanted to create a character that was different from how Black Mages were portrayed in previous games, and to this end he gave her a unique outfit and hairstyle. The centerpiece of her outfit a low-cut, fur-lined, dark grey and black dress that displays her pronounced cleavage, while her hair is done in an upright bun. Lulu is 167 centimetres (5 ft 5 1/2 in) tall, and with her hair and high heels stands 173 cm (5 ft 8 in).

Taking into account the PlayStation 2's improved graphics handling, Nomura opted to make his designs for Final Fantasy X "super deep and detailed", feeling that he "went kind of crazy" on Lulu's in particular. To complement her attire, he devised a series of belts that attached to her skirt in a certain order, and insisted that the 3D character modeler reproduce them to his exact specifications. Belts were a common feature of Nomura's character designs at the time, and he stated when outside observers noticed the trend and teased him over it, it only encouraged him to utilize them more. However, the outfit's complexity made it difficult to animate for cutscenes. The staff compromised by often only showing Lulu from the waist up, and excluded her from animated sequences involving complex motions.

In addition to her magic, Lulu can also utilize animated stuffed animals as weapons that attack on her behalf—a concept originally planned for inclusion in Final Fantasy VI. Each is based on a recurring character in the Final Fantasy franchise, such as moogles and cactuars. When drawing her concept art, Nomura outlined a list of stuffed animals she would be able to use during the course of the game. However, one in particular, the Tonberry, was cut from the final game. Her strongest weapon, the Onion Knight, went through several drafts in the sketch phase, including one idea to have the sword and shield resemble onions. Instead, its finalized design incorporated a pixelated image of a Final Fantasy III character with the class of the same name into its shield.

=== Voice casting ===
In English, Lulu is voiced by Paula Tiso, while in Japanese she is voiced by Rio Natsuki. Tiso stated that prior to recording she would watch the scenes first, which she felt made it easier for her to get into the mindset of the character. She found the task of voicing Lulu to be challenging nonetheless as the character was the "exact opposite of bubbly and smiley" voice work she was used to doing prior. To ease herself into the role, she had a chair brought in and did the voice recording from a seated position to allow her to give a more focused portrayal.

For her part, Natsuki appreciated that Lulu's role in the plot was small, as she preferred projects where other characters could hold centre stage, something she felt was in line with Lulu's personality. Originally, upon seeing Lulu's early design, she thought the character was meant to be intimidating, and during the audition spoke in a deeper tone. After seeing her in-game, however, she found Lulu to be "beautiful", and cited her choice of weapon as bringing an element of cuteness to her. An established voice actor, the development team were fans of her work, and she helped the less experienced voice actors during recording sessions. Natsuki grew particularly attached to voicing Lulu after seeing a scene wherein all the party members jumped off an airship, and she enjoyed collaborating with the other voice actors to create a sense of momentum and atmosphere when voicing the scene.

== Appearances ==
Lulu is one of the playable characters introduced in Square Enix's 2001 role playing video game Final Fantasy X. A Black Mage, she serves as an older sister figure to the game's protagonist Yuna, whom she grew up with alongside the brothers Wakka and Chappu on their home of Besaid Island. When Yuna sets out on a pilgrimage to defeat the creature Sin, Lulu follows suit and travels with her as a guardian. During the course of the game it is revealed she had accompanied two other summoners on identical pilgrimages before, though both journeys ended abruptly. Lulu had been romantically involved with Chappu, and his death at the hands of Sin prior to the game's events affected her greatly. She later falls in love with Wakka, and helps Yuna destroy Sin.

In the game's sequel, Final Fantasy X-2, she was relegated to a supporting role due to game director Motomu Toriyama feeling her presence as a playable character would have undermined Yuna's story, as the latter "would have relied on her like an older sister and this would have got in the way of [Yuna's] quest to find a new self". Lulu can instead be found in the game's Besaid location married to Wakka, where they have a child together. Lulu later appears in both the sequel novel Final Fantasy 10-2.5 ~Eien no Daisho~ and its audio drama followup, Final Fantasy 10 -Will-. Now the mayor of Besaid, after observing recent revivals of both dead people and extinct species, she surmises that Sin's revival in the story was by similar means.

Outside the Final Fantasy X titles, Lulu makes an appearance in several other games, including Final Fantasy: Brave Exvius and Dissidia Final Fantasy Opera Omnia. Cards of the character have also been featured in the Final Fantasy Trading Card Game and Magic: The Gathering. In theatre, Lulu appears in the Final Fantasy X kabuki stage play, where she is portrayed by Nakamura Baishi. In the play her dress was replaced with a fur-lined kimono to tie in to the theme of the production and follow a more Japanese aesthetic.

== Promotion and reception ==
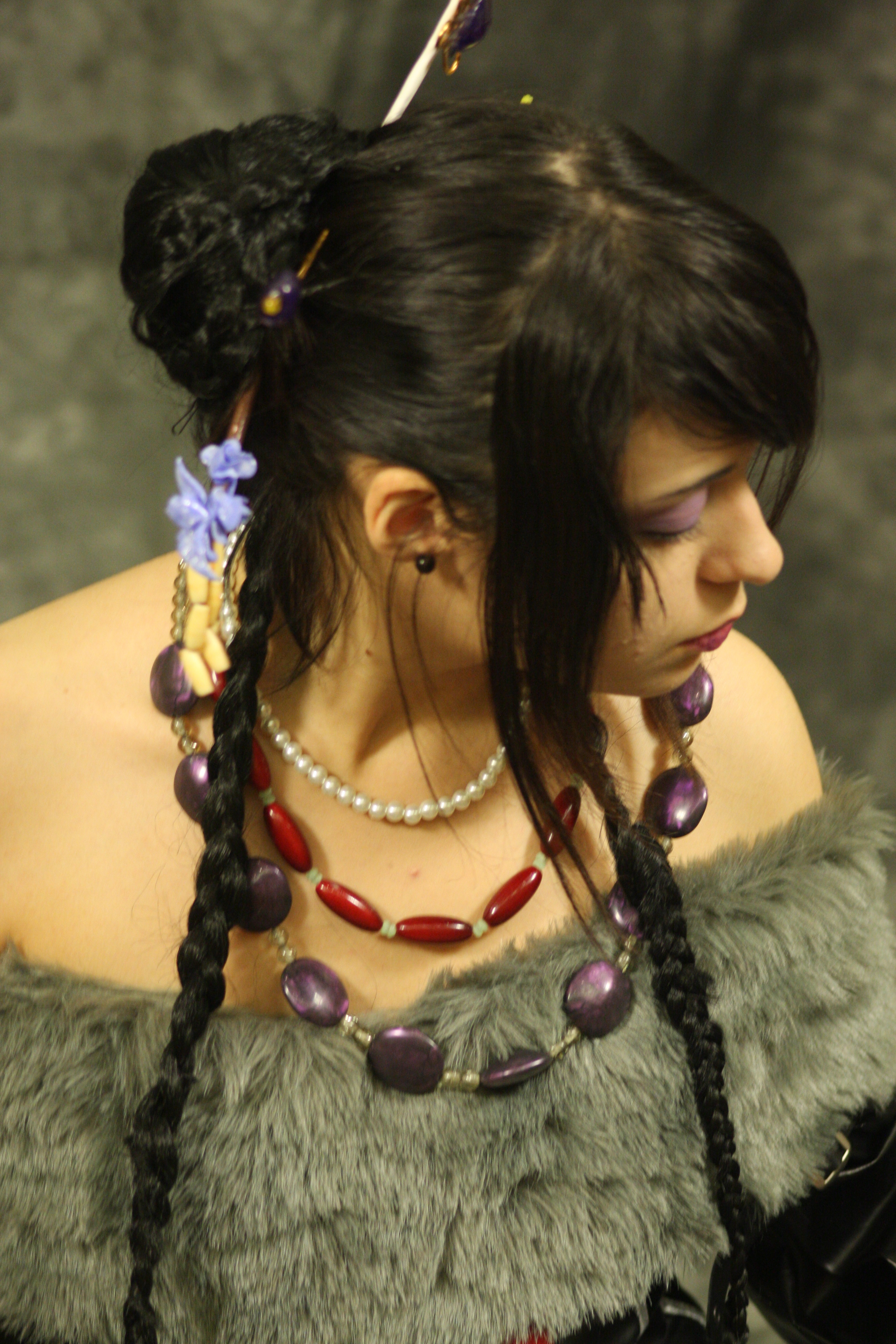
Lulu's design has made her a frequent subject of cosplay by fans.

Several items of merchandise were produced to promote Lulu and her game of origin, including trading cards, wall scrolls, and plushies modeled after the effigies she uses in battle. In addition, several figurines were also produced, such as a 1/6th scale statue by ARTFX. Both regular and chibi bottle topper figurines were produced as part of a 2001 promotional campaign for Final Fantasy X by soda company Coca-Cola. In 2004 Trading Ars released a PVC statue of Lulu, posed in a reclining position with her lower body lying on the ground. Later on, a costume in the likeness of Lulu was included as part of a Final Fantasy-themed promotion for Gunslinger Stratos 2. A "minion" companion character of her that follows players around was also released as an in-game item for Final Fantasy XIV.

Lulu's outfit drew particular focus from media outlets. Todd Hargosh of Game Industry News called it the strangest outfit he had ever seen and felt the belts made her "look like a dominatrix. Daniel Żelazny of PPE named Lulu one his favorite Final Fantasy characters due to how her appearance deviated from that of a typical Black Mage, thanks to her overt and complex dress. He added that the outfit was not only one of Nomura's best creations, but also one of the best female character outfits in video games overall. Dave Smith of IGN opined that Lulu's outfit was a positive outgrowth of Nomura's penchant for overdressed characters, and that her design, with highlights such as "[a] floor-length skirt, elaborately pinned hair, and [a] collection of super-cute mascot dolls", was one of the "coolest" in the franchise. He additionally praised her personality as matching her fashion sense and conveying a "beautifully menacing presence". Despite the complexity of Lulu's clothing, she has been cited as a frequent subject of cosplay.

In 2009, GamesRadar+ called Lulu one of the sexiest video game characters of the last decade and attributed her appeal to her large breasts and outfit, the latter of which they described as an ensemble in the style of a "goth-mage-hooker" aesthetic that appeared ready to "fall right off at any second". They acknowledged that her visual allure was equalled by her self-assured composure, and spoke favorably of both her protective nature and strength as a mage. Gus Turner of Complex echoed these sentiments and lauded the character's "smoky" and "sensual" voice. He further praised her rational attitude towards the central revelations in the game's story. Relatedly, the staff of GMR magazine felt she served as a "calm presence" among the original game's cast, and added they would have preferred the "sultry, dollhugging, goth mama" to have been playable in X-2 instead of the game's actual cast. However, Gamasutra editor Kurt Kalata criticized her appearance as "outlandish" and called "goth girl" Lulu more akin to a "fetish object" than an inhabitant of Final Fantasy X's world. Japanese magazine Game Criticism considered the fan service aspect of Lulu "excessive" and described her outfit as a "S & M straightjacket".

Damien Mecheri in the book The Legend of Final Fantasy X argued that a well-rounded party in a roleplaying game is incomplete without a character who is "a bit cold, dark, and taciturn", and commented that Lulu fit this archetype well. He compared her character design to Edea Kramer of Final Fantasy VIII in how both were built around "bizarre features from the imagination of Tetsuya Nomura". Mecheri stated that, while her character was not particularly complex, he was drawn to the "odd couple" relationship she had with Wakka, and noted that her emotional maturity coupled with her youth brought a "bit of wisdom to the [Final Fantasy X] cast". Other commentators offered their own examination of her character's part in the story. Paul Shkreli of RPGamer enjoyed Lulu's personal evolution during the narrative and her willingness to question her core tenets, stating that "Lulu's irony is that her humanity is what makes her effective as a protector, not the other way around". Margaret David of Den of Geek believed that Lulu's spoken dialogue enhanced her character and articulated her "harsh but protective manner" in a way text alone could not express. David felt that, without the voice acting, she would have potentially been remembered as an unlikable character instead of the "dark horse fave" she became.

According to Matt Sainsbury of DigitallyDownloaded.net, the novelty of Lulu's design helped flesh out her role as a character, particularly as a Black Mage. He pointed out that previous entries in the Final Fantasy series often presented such characters as "mysterious, dark" spellcasters able to wield destructive magic liberally, a depiction which was "not really sufficient for the kind of characterisation needed in modern JRPG storytelling". Sainsbury claimed that, while Lulu's outward appearance seemingly upheld that trend by invoking imagery of sadomasochism, her actual portrayal as a severe but motherly figure contrasted his expectations and gave her depth without compromising her image. He singled out such subversions in character design as a particular attraction of the Final Fantasy games as a whole.
