= Snow Bros. =

1990 video game

- Developer: Toaplan (Note: Game Boy version developed by Dual; NES version developed by Soft House.)
- Publishers: Toaplan: Arcade; JP/EU: Toaplan; NA: Romstar Game Boy; JP: Naxat Soft; NA/EU: Capcom NES; NA/PAL: Capcom; JP: Toaplan Mega Drive Tengen iOS, Android ISAC Entertainment
- Composer: Osamu Ōta
- Series: Snow Bros.
- Platforms: Arcade, Game Boy, NES, Mega Drive, Android, iOS
- Release: April 1990: Arcade; JP: April 1990; NA: May 1990; EU: 1990 Game Boy; JP: 24 May 1991; NA: January 1992; EU: 1992 NES; NA: November 1991; JP: December 1991; EU: 1991 Mega Drive; JP: 28 May 1993 iOS, Android; WW: 2012
- Genre: Platform
- Modes: Single-player, multiplayer

Snow Bros. (Note: Japanese: スノーブラザーズ, Hepburn: Sunō Burazāzu; lit. "Snow Brothers") is a 1990 platform video game developed and published by Toaplan for Japanese arcades; it was distributed by Romstar in North America and Europe. Players control snowman twins Nick and Tom as they travel through 50 stages, using snowballs as weapons while navigating obstacles and battling monsters in order to rescue the princesses Puripuri and Puchipuchi. The game was later ported to multiple platforms, each one by different third-party developers and featuring several changes or additions. Versions for various microcomputers were in development, but were never officially released.

Snow Bros. was met with mostly positive reception from critics and players alike, earning an award from Gamest magazine and gaining a cult following since its initial release. In 1994, a sequel titled Snow Bros. 2: With New Elves was released by Hanafram, serving as the last game by Toaplan prior to their closure. The rights to Snow Bros. are currently owned by Tatsujin, a Japanese company formed by Masahiro Yuge. A modernized version of the game, titled Snow Bros Special, was developed by CRT Games and published by Daewon Media Game Lab and Clear River Games for Nintendo Switch, and was released in May 2022. A third installment in the series, Snow Bros. Wonderland, was released in 2024.

== Gameplay ==
Arcade version screenshot

Snow Bros. is a platform game reminiscent of Bubble Bobble and Tumblepop, where players assume the role of snowmen twins Nick (wearing blue overalls) and Tom (wearing red overalls) through 50 increasingly difficult stages, each with a boss at every tenth stage that must be fought before progressing any further, in an effort to rescue twin princesses Puripuri and Puchipuchi from captivity as the main objective. The plot summary of Snow Bros. varies between each region and version. In the NES port, King Scorch cursed princes Nick and Tom by turning them into snowmen, while he also captured the princess twins Teri and Tina, leading the brothers to defeat the king to save their land.

Each player can throw snow at enemies until each one is completely covered and turns into a snowball, but partially covered enemies in snow cannot move until they shake it off. Once an enemy has been turned into a snowball, players can roll or throw the snowball, which will rebound off of walls until eventually shattering against the wall. Any enemies the snowball rolls into are eliminated and other stationary snowballs start rolling when the rolling snowball touches them. If players manage to take out all enemies by kicking one snowball (this one snowball may be used to make others bounce around as well and increase the chances to pull this trick off), bonus money will fall from the sky. If the player takes too much time to complete a level, an evil pumpkin head will come and try to kill the players. It is invincible but can be stunned and sent to appear elsewhere in the level with snowballs or snow shots. The evil pumpkin head will eventually spawn ghosts that travel freely through the level and seek the player character. These ghosts cannot be killed or stunned and players must avoid them while killing the rest of the enemies.

When players bowl an enemy over, it may drop a potion item. The color of said potions lets players know what power-up it is: the red potion increases speed, blue increases the amount of snow thrown to cover enemies in snow easier, yellow increases the distance that snow can be thrown, while green causes the snowmen to inflate like a balloon while having the ability to fly around the screen and knock out enemies for a limited period of time. The game hosts a number of hidden bonus secrets to be found, which are crucial for reaching high-scores to obtain extra lives. If a single player is downed, their character is immediately respawned at the location they start at on every stage. Getting hit by enemy fire will result in losing a life, as well as a penalty of decreasing the characters' firepower and speed to his original state and once all lives are lost, the game is over unless the players insert more credits into the arcade machine to continue playing.

== Development ==
=== Amiga version ===
Snow Bros. for the Amiga was created by Ocean France, the French division of publisher Ocean Software that previously worked on other conversions such as Pang and Rainbow Islands: The Story of Bubble Bobble 2, with Marc Djan managing its development. Ocean Software acquired the license after the European Computer Entertainment Show in September 1990 while work on the port immediately began as soon as programmer Pierre Adane finished his task of converting Pang.

Despite receiving almost no support from Toaplan, the team at Ocean France wanted the Amiga port of Snow Bros. to be as close as possible to the arcade original, playing the coin-op machine from start to finish while using it as reference when taking notes about certain elements such as animations, graphic techniques and enemy AI. Work on the conversion was primarily done on Amiga and Atari ST-based systems, while custom software was written to animate sprites and build stages as a jigsaw puzzle using low memory, which allowed an easier coding process to implement every element from the arcade version like hidden bonus secrets. Artists Philippe and Lionel Dessoly, as well as Francis Fournier adapted the arcade artwork for the conversion, using a ST set-up for maps and sprites, while Pierre Loriaux was responsible for sound design.

The crew also included new additions such as cutscenes between stages, and Adane was also able to replicate the original gameplay speed, though alterations had to be made to make the game more playable. Adane said that co-op play was removed in order to maintain a stable frame rate during gameplay, which was deemed by Djan as "probably the most important factor".

== Release ==
Snow Bros. was first released for arcades in April 1990 in Japan by Toaplan and North America by Romstar, and later in Europe the same year. The soundtrack was composed by Osamu Ōta. The same year on 21 October, an album containing music from the title and Out Zone was co-published exclusively in Japan by Scitron and Pony Canyon, featuring an arranged soundtrack composed by Ōta.

=== Ports ===
The Game Boy conversion, titled Snow Bros. Jr., was developed by Dual and first released in Japan by Naxat Soft on 24 May 1991, and in North America by Capcom in January 1992. It is single-player only and changes the story to compensate for this by having one of the titular snowmen twins be kidnapped while the other sets out to rescue him. Several other aspects of the game were changed due to the technical restrictions of the Game Boy, such as bosses that originally fought in pairs in the arcade version now fight alone and potions are now given different shape due to the lack of color display on the original Game Boy. The Game Boy version also adds an extra set of 10 levels after the 50 levels adapted from the arcade version are cleared.

The Nintendo Entertainment System version, titled Snow Brothers in western regions, was developed by Soft House and first released in North America by Capcom in November 1991, then in Japan in December of the same year by Toaplan as well as in Europe. It features a new story sequence at the beginning which depicts a unique origin story; Nick and Tom are established to be human princes who were cursed into becoming snowmen by an evil demon named King Scorch.

The Mega Drive version was released only in Japan by Tengen on 28 May 1993, and was the only console version of the game to be developed by Toaplan. It features a new opening story sequence at the start of the game, as well as 20 additional levels set after the original 50 levels, in which the player may switch controls from Nick and Tom to the twin princesses Puripuri and Puchipuchi after the snowmen twins themselves get kidnapped by a new adversary. The Mega Drive version is included on both the Japanese and Asian versions of the Sega Genesis Mini.

ISAC Entertainment released an enhanced version of Snow Bros. for iOS and Android mobile devices in 2012. Ten years later in 2022, Snow Bros. was included as part of the Toaplan Arcade 1 compilation for the Evercade.

=== Cancelled ports ===
Ocean France had plans to develop Snow Bros. for various microcomputer and console platforms such as the GX4000, Amiga, Atari ST, Commodore 64 and ZX Spectrum in 1991 but none of these conversions were officially released by Ocean Software. Like the Game Boy port, the Amiga version lacks multiplayer functionality due to gameplay reasons. A ROM image of the Amiga version was leaked online in 2006. A PC Engine Super CD-ROM² version was also planned but never released.

== Reception ==
Reception
Review scores
Publication	Scores			
Publication	GB	NES	AGA	SMD
ACE	800/1000	—N/a	—N/a	—N/a
ASM	8/12	—N/a	—N/a	—N/a
AllGame	—N/a	4/5	—N/a	—N/a
Beep! Mega Drive	—N/a	—N/a	—N/a	23/40
CVG	90%	—N/a	—N/a	—N/a
EGM	—N/a	6/10, 7/10, 6/10, 7/10	—N/a	—N/a
Famitsu	23/40	24/40	—N/a	23/40
GamePro	—N/a	19/25	—N/a	—N/a
Génération 4	90%	—N/a	91%	—N/a
Hippon Super!	—N/a	—N/a	—N/a	60/100
Hobby Consolas	—N/a	84/100	—N/a	—N/a
Joypad	93%	—N/a	—N/a	—N/a
Joystick	93%	—N/a	92%	—N/a
Mean Machines	79%	—N/a	—N/a	—N/a
Mean Machines Sega	—N/a	—N/a	—N/a	83/100
MDAG	—N/a	—N/a	—N/a	59%
MegaTech	—N/a	—N/a	—N/a	86%
Nintendo Power	—N/a	12.8/20	—N/a	—N/a
Play Time	32%	—N/a	—N/a	—N/a
Power Unlimited	—N/a	72/100	—N/a	—N/a
Sega Force Mega	—N/a	—N/a	—N/a	91/100
Sega Pro	—N/a	—N/a	—N/a	79%
Sega Zone	—N/a	—N/a	—N/a	51/100
Super Game	—N/a	—N/a	—N/a	70/100
Superjuegos	77,8/100	—N/a	—N/a	—N/a
Video Games	—N/a	—N/a	—N/a	75%
Awards
Publication(s)		Award(s)		
Gamest Mook (1998)		Annual Hit Game 48th		

RePlay reported Snow Bros. to be the eleventh most popular arcade game of June 1990. Game Machine also listed the title as Japan's eleventh most popular arcade game of June 1990. Donn Nauert of VideoGames & Computer Entertainment gave a positive outlook on the arcade version. In the September 1990 issue of Japanese publication Micom BASIC Magazine, the game was ranked on the number eight spot in popularity. Den of Geek noted it to be one of the titles from Toaplan in which the company pursued other game genres besides their shoot 'em up endeavors. The arcade original has gained a cult following since its release.

The Game Boy port was met with positive reception from critics and fans. In a poll taken by Family Computer Magazine, it received a score of 19.7 out of 30, indicating a popular following. The NES conversion was also met with positive reception from reviewers and fans, garnering a score of 19.7 out of 30, indicating a popular following.

The Amiga version of Snow Bros. was met with positive reception from critics prior to its cancellation.

== Legacy ==
A sequel, titled Snow Bros. 2: With New Elves (known in Japan as Otenki Paradise: Snow Bros. 2), was launched in 1994 and served as the final arcade project developed by Toaplan, as the company filed for bankruptcy during the game's release. A game of a similar style titled Nightmare in the Dark was developed in 2000 by AM Factory and published by Eleven/Gavaking and SNK for the Neo Geo MVS.

In 2002, a Mexican company known as Syrmex Electronics created a hack of the original Snow Bros. running on similar hardware called Snow Brothers 3: Magical Adventure, replacing Nick and Tom with soccer players who shoot soccer balls instead of snowballs, while featuring levels similar to those of the original despite new graphics and artwork added to the levels' backgrounds. It was the only game developed by Syrmex.

In more recent years, the rights to Snow Bros., its successor and many other IPs from Toaplan are now owned by Tatsujin, a company named after Truxton's Japanese title that was founded in 2017 by former Toaplan employee Masahiro Yuge, and is part of Embracer Group since 2022. A revival for the Nintendo Switch was developed by CRT Games and released in 2022 by Daewon Media Game Lab (downloads) and Clear River Games (physical copies).

A follow-up to Snow Bros. 2, named Snow Bros. Wonderland, was released in November 2024 for the PlayStation 4, PlayStation 5 and Nintendo Switch. The game was developed by Tatsujin and published by Clear River Games.
