= Final Fantasy X =

2001 video game

- North American cover art featuring the protagonist Tidus
- Developer: Square Product Development Division 1
- Publishers: JP: Square; NA: Square Electronic Arts; PAL: Sony Computer Entertainment
- Director: Yoshinori Kitase
- Producer: Yoshinori Kitase
- Designers: Motomu Toriyama; Takayoshi Nakazato; Toshiro Tsuchida
- Programmers: Koji Sugimoto; Takashi Katano
- Artists: Yusuke Naora; Shintaro Takai; Tetsuya Nomura
- Writers: Kazushige Nojima; Daisuke Watanabe; Motomu Toriyama; Yoshinori Kitase
- Composers: Nobuo Uematsu; Masashi Hamauzu; Junya Nakano
- Series: Final Fantasy
- Platform: PlayStation 2
- Release: JP: July 19, 2001; NA: December 18, 2001; AU: May 17, 2002; EU: May 24, 2002; International: JP: January 31, 2002
- Genre: Role-playing
- Mode: Single-player

Final Fantasy X (Note: Japanese: ファイナルファンタジーX, Hepburn: Fainaru Fantajī Ten) is a 2001 role-playing video game developed and published by Square for PlayStation 2. The tenth main installment in the Final Fantasy series, it is the first game in the series to feature fully three-dimensional areas (though some areas were still pre-rendered), and voice acting. Final Fantasy X replaces the Active Time Battle (ATB) system with the "Conditional Turn-Based Battle" (CTB) system, and uses a new leveling system called the "Sphere Grid".

The game is set in the fantasy world of Spira, a setting influenced by the South Pacific, Thailand and Japan, while the name of the city of Samarkand in Uzbekistan has been cited as an inspiration for Zanarkand. The game's story revolves around a group of adventurers and their quest to defeat a rampaging monster known as Sin. The player character is Tidus, a star athlete in the fictional sport of blitzball, who finds himself in Spira after Sin destroyed his home city of Zanarkand. After meeting the summoner Yuna, Tidus embarks on quest to destroy Sin, having discovered its true identity is that of his missing father, Jecht.

Development of Final Fantasy X began in 1999, with a budget of more than $32.3 million ($62.4 million in 2025 dollars) and a team of more than 100 people. The game was the first in the main series not entirely scored by Nobuo Uematsu; Masashi Hamauzu and Junya Nakano were signed as Uematsu's fellow composers. Final Fantasy X was both a critical and commercial success, shipping over 8.5 million units worldwide on PlayStation 2. It has been cited as one of the greatest video games of all time. It was followed by Final Fantasy X-2 in March 2003, making it the first Final Fantasy game to have a direct game sequel. As of September 2021, the Final Fantasy X series had sold over 20.8 million units worldwide, and at the end of March 2022 had surpassed 21.1 million. A remaster, Final Fantasy X/X-2 HD Remaster was released for the PlayStation 3 and PlayStation Vita in 2013, for PlayStation 4 in 2015, Windows in 2016, for Nintendo Switch and Xbox One in 2019, and for the Nintendo Switch 2 in 2026.

== Gameplay ==
Like previous games in the series, Final Fantasy X is presented in a third-person perspective, with players directly navigating the main character, Tidus, around the world to interact with objects and people. Unlike previous games, however, the world and town maps have been fully integrated, with terrain outside of cities rendered to scale. As Tidus explores the world, he randomly encounters enemies. When an enemy is encountered, the environment switches to a turn-based battle area where characters and enemies await their turn to attack.

The gameplay of Final Fantasy X differs from that of previous Final Fantasy games in its lack of a top-down perspective world map. Earlier games featured a miniature representation of the expansive areas between towns and other distinct locations, used for long-distance traveling. In the game, almost all the locations are essentially continuous and never fade out to a world map. Regional connections are mostly linear, forming a single path through the game's locations, though an airship becomes available late in the game, giving the player the ability to navigate Spira faster. Like previous games in the series, Final Fantasy X features numerous minigames, including the underwater sport blitzball.

=== Combat ===
A boss battle screen showing a heads-up display to illustrate battle information

Final Fantasy X introduces the Conditional Turn-Based Battle (CTB) system in place of the series' traditional Active Time Battle (ATB) system first used in Final Fantasy IV. Whereas the ATB concept features real-time elements, the CTB system is a turn-based format that pauses the battle during each of the player's turns. Thus, the CTB design allows the player to select an action without time pressure. A graphical timeline along the upper-right side of the screen details who will be receiving turns next, and how various actions taken will affect the subsequent order of turns. The ordering of turns can be affected by a number of spells, items, and abilities that inflict status effects upon the controlled characters or the enemies. The player can control up to three characters in battle, though a swapping system allows the player to replace them with a character outside the active party at any time. "Limit Breaks", highly damaging special attacks, reappear in Final Fantasy X as "Overdrives". In this incarnation of the feature, most of the techniques are interactive, requiring button inputs to increase their effectiveness. While initially the Overdrives can be used when the character receives a significant amount of damage, the player is able to modify the requirements to unlock them.

Final Fantasy X overhauled the summoning system employed in previous games of the series. Whereas in previous titles a summoned creature would arrive, perform one action, and then depart, the "Aeons" in X arrive and replace the battle party, fighting in their place until either the aeon wins the battle, is defeated itself, or is dismissed by the player. Aeons have their own statistics, commands, special attacks, spells, and Overdrives. The player acquires five aeons over the course of the game through the completion of Cloister of Trials puzzles; three additional aeons can be obtained by completing various side-quests.

=== Sphere Grid ===
As with previous titles in the series, players can develop and improve their characters by defeating enemies and acquiring items, though the traditional experience point system is replaced by a new system called the "Sphere Grid". Instead of characters gaining pre-determined statistic bonuses for their attributes after leveling up, each character gains "Sphere Levels" after collecting enough Ability Points (AP). Sphere Levels allow players to move around the Sphere Grid, a pre-determined grid of interconnected nodes consisting of various statistic and ability bonuses. "Spheres" are applied to these nodes, unlocking its function for the selected character.

The Sphere Grid system allows players to fully customize characters in contrast to their intended battle roles, such as turning the White Mage-roled Yuna into a physical powerhouse and the swordsman Auron into a healer. The International and PAL versions of the game include an optional "Expert" version of the Sphere Grid; in these versions, all of the characters start in the middle of the grid and may follow whichever path the player chooses. As a trade-off, the Expert grid has fewer nodes in total, thus decreasing the total statistic upgrades available during the game.

=== Blitzball ===
Blitzball is a minigame that requires strategy and tactics. The underwater sport is played in a large, hovering sphere of water surrounded by a larger audience of onlookers. The player controls one character at a time as they swim through the sphere performing passes, tackles, and attempts to score. The gameplay is similar to that of the main game in the way that the controlled character moves through the area until they encounter an enemy. In this case, the enemy is a member of the opposing team. Status effects are also implemented in the minigame as each player can learn techniques that are equivalent to abilities in the main game.

Blitzball is introduced in the beginning of the game during one of the early cinematic sequences in which Tidus, the main character who is described as a star blitzball player, is part of an intense game. It is the only minigame that plays a role in the overall plot line as it is a main part of Tidus's character, and is in the first scene where the game's main antagonist, Sin is shown. Unlike with the other minigames, playing blitzball is mandatory near the beginning of the game, but it is later optional.

== Plot ==
=== Setting and characters ===
Final Fantasy X is set in the fictional world of Spira, consisting of one large landmass divided into three subcontinents, surrounded by small tropical islands. It features diverse climates, ranging from the tropical Besaid and Kilika islands, to the temperate Mi'ihen region, to the frigid Macalania and Mt. Gagazet areas. Spira is very different from the mainly European-style worlds found in previous Final Fantasy games, being much more closely modeled on Southeast Asia, most notably with respect to vegetation, topography, architecture, and names.

Spira features a variety of races, though predominantly populated by humans. Among them are the Al Bhed, a technologically advanced but disenfranchised sub-group of humans with distinctive green eyes and unique language. The Guado are less human in appearance, with elongated fingers and other arboreal features. Still less human are the lion-like Ronso and the frog-like Hypello. A subset of Spira's sentient races are the "unsent", the strong-willed spirits of the dead that remain in corporeal form. In Spira, the dead who are not sent to the Farplane by a summoner come to envy the living and transform into "fiends", the monsters that are encountered throughout the game; however, unsent with strong attachments to the world of the living may retain their human form. Other fauna in Spira, aside from those drawn from real animals, such as cats, dogs, birds, and butterflies, include the gigantic, amphibious shoopufs (which are similar to elephants); and the emu-like chocobo, which appears in most Final Fantasy games.

There are seven main playable characters in Final Fantasy X, starting with Tidus (James Arnold Taylor/Masakazu Morita), a cheerful young teenager and a star blitzball player from Zanarkand, who seeks a way home after an encounter with Sin transported him to Spira. To do so, he joins Yuna (Hedy Burress/Mayuko Aoki), a summoner on a journey to obtain the Final Aeon and defeat the enormous whale-like "Sin". Journeying with them are: Kimahri Ronso (John DiMaggio/Katsumi Chō), a young warrior of the Ronso tribe who watched over Yuna during her childhood; Wakka (DiMaggio/Kazuya Nakai), a blitzball player whose younger brother was killed by Sin; and Lulu (Paula Tiso/Rio Natsuki), a stoic black mage close to Yuna and Wakka. During the journey, they are joined by Auron (Matt McKenzie/Hideo Ishikawa), a former warrior monk, who worked with both Tidus' and Yuna's fathers to defeat Sin 10 years prior; and Rikku (Tara Strong/Marika Matsumoto), Yuna's cousin, a perky Al Bhed girl and the first friendly person Tidus meets upon arriving in Spira.

=== Story ===
In the high-tech metropolis of Zanarkand, Tidus is a renowned blitzball player and son of the famous blitzball star Jecht, an abusive father who disappeared 10 years prior. During a blitzball tournament, the city is attacked by an immense creature that Auron, a man not originally from Zanarkand, calls "Sin". Sin destroys Zanarkand and transports Tidus and Auron to the world of Spira. Upon arriving in Spira, Tidus is rescued by Al Bhed salvagers, including a young girl named Rikku. When Tidus asks Rikku about a way back to Zanarkand, she tells him that Sin destroyed Zanarkand 1,000 years ago. After Sin attacks again, Tidus is separated from the divers and drifts to the tropical island of Besaid, where he meets Wakka, captain of the local blitzball team. Wakka introduces Tidus to Yuna, a young summoner about to go on a pilgrimage to obtain the Final Aeon and defeat Sin with her guardians Lulu, a mage of black magic, and Kimahri, a member of the Ronso tribe. The party travels across Spira to gather aeons, defending against attacks by Sin and its "offspring", called Sinspawn. Tidus meets Auron again, who convinces Tidus to become Yuna's guardian after revealing that Jecht is Sin's true identity. Ten years ago, Auron and Jecht were guardians to Yuna's late father Braska on his pilgrimage to defeat Sin, but Jecht became the new Sin. As Yuna's party continues their pilgrimage, Tidus reunites with Rikku, whom the party learns is Yuna's cousin.

When the party arrives in the city of Guadosalam, the leader of the Guado and major clergy member Seymour Guado, proposes to Yuna, saying that it will ease Spira's sorrow. At Macalania Temple, the group discovers a message from the spirit of Seymour's father, Lord Jyscal; he declares that he was killed by his own son, who now aims to destroy Spira. The group reunites with Yuna and kills Seymour in battle; soon afterward, Sin attacks, separating Yuna and sending the others to the arid Bikanel Island. While searching for Yuna at the island's Al Bhed settlement, Tidus has an emotional breakdown when he learns that summoners die after summoning the Final Aeon. He resolves to find a way to defeat Sin while keeping Yuna alive. The group finds Yuna in Bevelle, the center of the clergy's power, where she is being forced to marry the unsent Seymour. They crash the wedding, after which Seymour reveals his plan to become Sin with Yuna's help. The party defeats him a second time and escapes with Yuna, heading toward the ruins of Zanarkand.

Shortly before arriving, Tidus learns that he, Jecht, and the Zanarkand they hail from are summoned entities akin to aeons based on the original Zanarkand and its people. Long ago, the original Zanarkand battled Bevelle in a machina war, in which the former was defeated. Zanarkand's survivors became "fayth" so that they could use their memories of Zanarkand to create a new city in their image, removed from the reality of Spira. Once they reach Zanarkand, Yunalesca—the first summoner to defeat Sin, who became an unsent—tells the group that the Final Aeon is created from the fayth of one close to the summoner. After defeating Sin, the Final Aeon kills the summoner and transforms into a new Sin, which causes its cycle of rebirth to continue. The group decides against using the Final Aeon, due to the futile sacrifices it carries and the fact that Sin would still be reborn. Yunalesca tries to kill the party, but she is defeated and vanishes, ending hope of anyone ever attaining the Final Aeon again.

After the fight, the group learns that Yu Yevon — the deity of the Yevon religion who was a summoner from Zanarkand before losing his humanity and his mind — is behind Sin's cycle of rebirth. This leads the group to use the airship and infiltrate Sin's body to find Yu Yevon. Inside Sin, the party finds the unsent Seymour, who was absorbed by Sin and intends to control it from within. Yuna defeats him for the final time before sending him to the Farplane. Shortly after, the group reaches the core of Sin and finds Jecht's imprisoned spirit. Tidus and Jecht come to terms with the latter's abuse. Jecht transforms into his Final Aeon form, asking the party to defeat him and end the cycle; they do so. With Sin's host defeated, Yuna summons each of her aeons, which Yu Yevon then possesses. The group defeats the aeons, then vanquishes Yu Yevon himself.

Sin's cycle of rebirth ends when Yuna sends Sin and the Aeons to the farplane, freeing the spirits of Spira's fayth from their imprisonment. Auron, who was also an unsent, is sent to the Farplane as well. Dream Zanarkand and Tidus disappear, now that the freed fayth have stopped the summoning. Afterward, in a speech to the citizens of Spira, Yuna resolves to help rebuild their world now that it is free of Sin and gives a speech remembering all those that have been lost. In a post-credits scene, Tidus awakens underwater and swims towards the ocean surface, reaching towards Jecht and the light at the surface.

== Development ==
Final Fantasy X's development began in 1999, costing approximately ¥4 billion (approximately $32.3 million, or $62.4 million in 2025 dollars) with a crew of over 100 people, most of whom worked on previous games in the series. Executive producer Hironobu Sakaguchi has stated that although he had concerns about the transition from 2D to 3D backgrounds, the voice acting, and the transition to real-time story-telling, the success of the Final Fantasy series can be attributed to constantly challenging the development team to try new things. Producer Yoshinori Kitase was also the chief director of Final Fantasy X, while the direction of events, maps and battles was split up between Motomu Toriyama, Takayoshi Nakazato and Toshiro Tsuchida, respectively. The development of the script for the game took three to four months, with the same amount of time dedicated to the voice recording afterwards. Tetsuya Nomura and Kazushige Nojima collaborated with Daisuke Watanabe, Toriyama and Kitase on writing the scenario for Final Fantasy X. Nojima was particularly concerned with establishing a connection in the relationship between player and main character. Thus, he penned the story such that the player's progress through the world and growing knowledge about it is reflected in Tidus' own understanding and narration.

According to the Square Enix companion book Final Fantasy Ultimania Archive Volume III, 17 SEVEN TEEN was a temporary title early in Final Fantasy X's production. 17 SEVEN TEEN's story differed from the final version: the protagonist, who looked similar to Tidus, traveled the world seeking a cure for a pandemic that killed people when they reached the age of seventeen. This inevitable death motif was later carried over to Yuna's fate as a summoner.

=== Influences ===
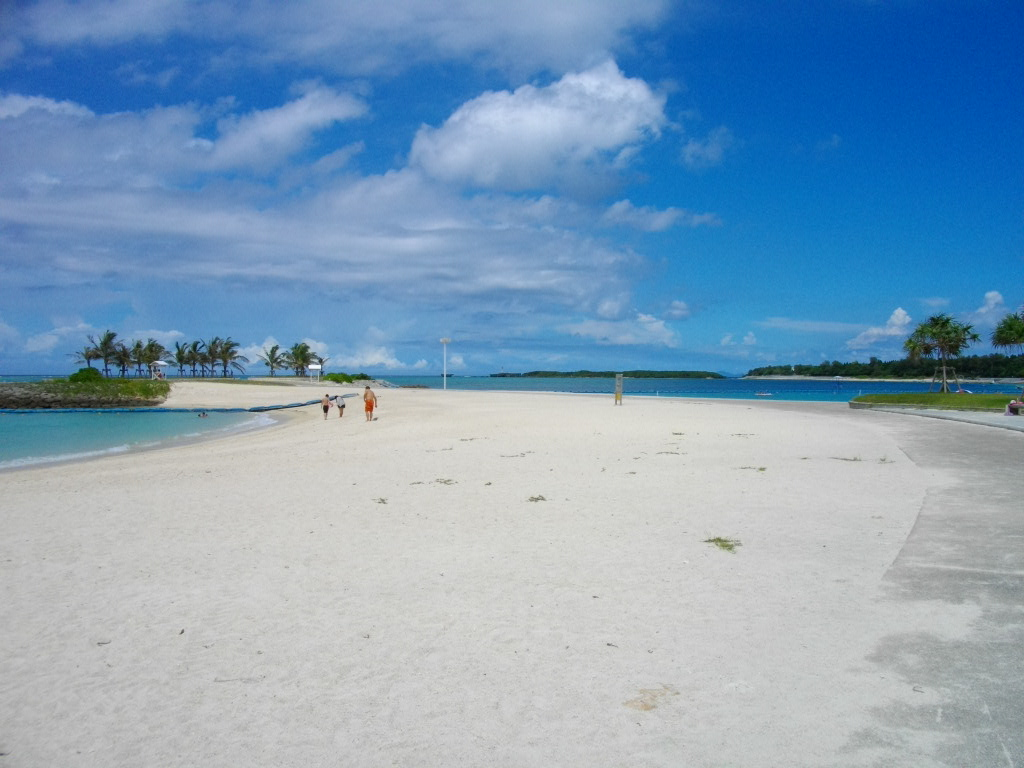
The development team was interested in giving the game a tropical flair, basing the game's setting, Spira, on locations like Okinawa in southern Japan.

Character designer Tetsuya Nomura identified the South Pacific, Thailand and Okinawa as major influences on the cultural and geographic design of Spira, particularly concerning the geographic location of the southern Besaid and Kilika islands. The protagonists' namesakes are derived from Okinawan language, with "tiida" meaning "sun" and "yuna" meaning "moon". He has also said that Spira deviates from the worlds of past Final Fantasy games in the level of detail incorporated, something he has expressed to have made a conscious effort to maintain during the design process. Kitase felt that if the setting went back to a medieval European fantasy, it would not seem to help the development team advance. While he was thinking of different world environments, Nojima suggested a fantasy world that incorporated Asian elements.

Sub-character chief designer Fumi Nakashima's focus was to ensure that characters from different regions and cultures bore distinctive characteristics in their clothing styles, so that they could be quickly and easily identified as members of their respective sub-groups. For example, she has said that the masks and goggles of the Al Bhed give the group a "strange and eccentric" appearance, while the attire of the Ronso lend to them being able to easily engage in battle. Tidus was originally envisioned to be a plumber as to connect to the underwater elements used in the game, according to Nojima, but they later made him into a blitzball athlete, helping to distinguish his character from prior Final Fantasy protagonists; Tidus' final outfit still incorporated elements of the original plumber outfit they had designed for him.

Tidus' relationship with his father Jecht was based on "stories throughout the ages, such as the ancient Greek legends". This would eventually reveal the key of Sin's weakness and eventual defeat. Auron was intended to be silent throughout the game but became a voiced character as they developed out the Guardian storyline between Tidus and Yuna. Although Final Fantasy X was originally centered on the relationship between Tidus and Yuna, the addition of Jecht's character and his feud with his son was added later in the making of the game to provide more focus on how the father and son produce a bigger impact in Spira's history rather than the romantic couple. Kitase found the story between Tidus and Jecht to be more moving than the story between Tidus and Yuna.

=== Design ===
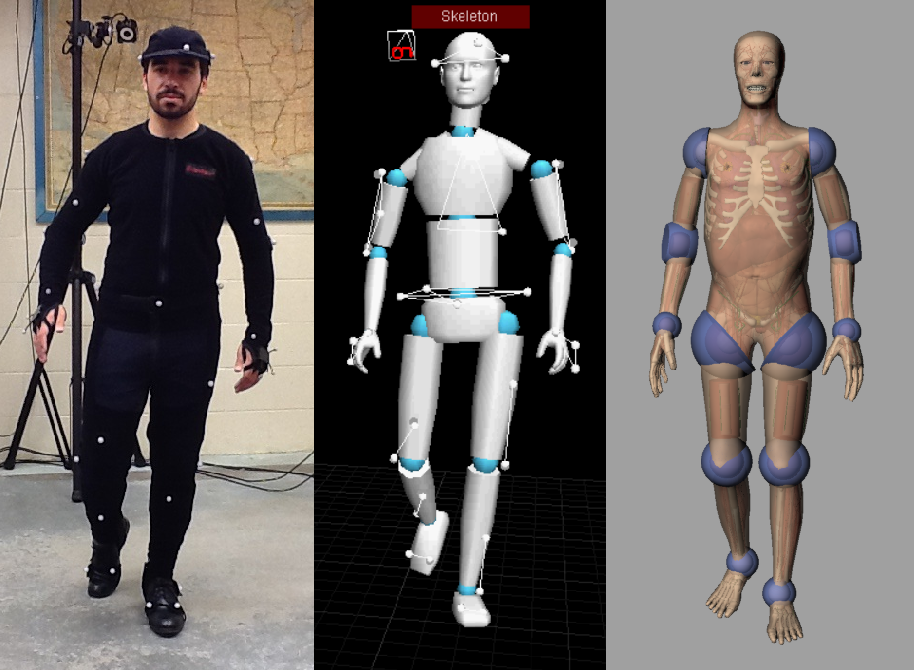
Final Fantasy X used motion capture similar to this image for character animations.

Final Fantasy X features innovations in the rendering of characters' facial expressions, achieved through motion capture and skeletal animation technology. This technology allowed animators to create realistic lip movements, which were then programmed to match the speech of the game's voice actors.

The cutscene of Tidus and Yuna kissing was developed by Visual Works, a subsidiary of Square Enix. Many of the animators were not experienced with romance scenes - Visual Works director Kazuyuki Ikumori said that the animators sought feedback from younger staff at Square Enix, as well as female members of staff. The scene was remade multiple times after receiving responses that earlier drafts were "unnatural" and "not believable".

Nojima has revealed that the inclusion of voice acting enabled him to express emotion more powerfully than before, and he was therefore able to keep the storyline simple. He also said that the presence of voice actors led him to make various changes to the script to match the voice actors' personalities with the characters they were portraying. The inclusion of voice, however, led to difficulties. With the game's cutscenes already programmed around the Japanese voice work, the English localization team faced the difficulty of establishing English-oriented dialogue and the obstacle of incorporating this modified wording with the rhythm and timing of the characters' lip movements. Localization specialist Alexander O. Smith noted that the team had to keep the localized sound file within the duration of the original Japanese, as longer files would cause the game to crash. He described the process of fitting natural-sounding English speech into the game as "something akin to writing four or five movies' worth of dialogue entirely in haiku form [and] of course the actors had to act, and act well, within those restraints".

The game was initially going to feature online elements, offered through Square's PlayOnline service. The features were dropped during production, and online gaming would not become part of the series until Final Fantasy XI. Map director Nakazato wanted to implement a world map concept with a more realistic approach than that of the traditional Final Fantasy game, in line with the realism of the game's 3D backgrounds, as opposed to pre-rendered backgrounds. Battle art director Shintaro Takai has explained that it was his intention that battles in Final Fantasy X come across as a natural part of the story and not an independent element. Features would have included wandering enemies visible on the field map, seamless transitions into battles, and the option for players to move around the landscape during enemy encounters. However, hardware limitations resulted in these ideas not being used. Instead, a compromise was made, whereby some transitions from the field map to the battle map were made relatively seamless with the implementation of a motion blur effect that would happen at the end of an event scene. The desire for seamless transitions also led to the implementation of the new summoning system seen in the game.

As a player of the games in the Final Fantasy series, battle director Toshiro Tsuchida wanted to recreate elements he found interesting or entertaining, which eventually led to the removal of the Active Time Battle system, and instead, incorporated the strategy-focused Conditional Turn-Based Battle system. Kitase has explained that the purpose behind the Sphere Grid is to give players an interactive means of increasing their characters' attributes, such that they will be able to observe the development of those attributes firsthand. At the time of the game's development, Nojiima had been reading about cryptography, and thus created the means to decode the Al Bhed language within the game, albeit simpler than initially planned.

=== Music ===
Final Fantasy X marks the first time regular series composer Nobuo Uematsu has had any assistance in composing the score for a game in the main series. His fellow composers for X were Masashi Hamauzu and Junya Nakano. They were chosen for the soundtrack based on their ability to create music that was different from Uematsu's style while still being able to work together. PlayOnline.com first revealed that the game's theme song was completed in November 2000. As Square still had not revealed who would sing the song, GameSpot personally asked Uematsu, who jokingly answered that it was going to be Rod Stewart.

The game features three songs with vocalized elements, including the J-pop ballad "Suteki da ne", which translates to "Isn't it Wonderful?". The lyrics were written by Kazushige Nojima, and the music was written by Uematsu. The song is performed by Japanese folk singer Rikki, whom the music team contacted while searching for a singer whose music reflected an Okinawan atmosphere. "Suteki da ne" is also sung in Japanese in the English version of Final Fantasy X. Like "Eyes on Me" from VIII and "Melodies of Life" from IX, an orchestrated version of "Suteki da ne" is used as part of the ending theme. The other songs with lyrics are the heavy metal opening theme, "Otherworld", sung in English by Bill Muir; and "Hymn of the Fayth", a recurring piece sung using Japanese syllabary.

The original soundtrack spanned 91 tracks on four discs. It was first released in Japan on August 1, 2001, by DigiCube, and was re-released on May 10, 2004, by Square Enix. In 2002, Tokyopop released a version of Final Fantasy X Original Soundtrack in North America entitled Final Fantasy X Official Soundtrack, which contained 17 tracks from the original album on a single disc. Other related CDs include feel/Go dream: Yuna & Tidus which, released in Japan by DigiCube on October 11, 2001, featured tracks based on Tidus' and Yuna's characters. Piano Collections Final Fantasy X, another collection of music from the game, and Final Fantasy X Vocal Collection, a compilations of exclusive character dialogues and songs were both released in Japan in 2002.

The Black Mages, a band led by Uematsu that arranges music from Final Fantasy video games into a rock music style, have arranged three pieces from Final Fantasy X. These are "Fight With Seymour" from their self-titled album, published in 2003, and "Otherworld" and "The Skies Above", both of which can be found on the album The Skies Above, published in 2004. Uematsu continues to perform certain pieces in his Dear Friends: Music from Final Fantasy concert series. The music of Final Fantasy X has also appeared in various official concerts and live albums, such as 20020220 Music from Final Fantasy, a live recording of an orchestra performing music from the series including several pieces from the game. An odd note is that the unreleased/promo CD-R (Instrumental) version of Madonna's "What It Feels Like For A Girl" done by Tracy Young was used in the blitzball sequences. Additionally, "Swing de Chocobo" was performed by the Royal Stockholm Philharmonic Orchestra for the Distant Worlds – Music from Final Fantasy concert tour, while "Zanarkand" was performed by the New Japan Philharmonic Orchestra in the Tour de Japon: Music from Final Fantasy concert series. Independent but officially licensed releases of Final Fantasy X music have been composed by such groups as Project Majestic Mix, which focuses on arranging video game music. Selections also appear on Japanese remix albums, called dojin music, and on English remixing websites.

== Versions and merchandise ==
Action figures of the characters Tidus, Yuna, and Auron

The Japanese version of Final Fantasy X included an additional disc entitled "The Other Side of Final Fantasy", which featured interviews, storyboards, and trailers for Blue Wing Blitz, Kingdom Hearts, and Final Fantasy: The Spirits Within, as well as the first footage of Final Fantasy XI Online. An international version of the game was released in Japan as Final Fantasy X International in January 2002, and in PAL regions under its original title. It features content not available in the original NTSC releases, including battles with "Dark" versions of the game's aeons and an airship fight with the superboss Penance. Final Fantasy X was released as Greatest Hits in North America in September 2003. Electronic Arts handled distribution of International in Asian territories, except Japan. The Japanese release of Final Fantasy X International also includes "Eternal Calm", a 14-minute video clip bridging the story of Final Fantasy X with that of its sequel, Final Fantasy X-2. The video clip was included in a bonus DVD for Unlimited Saga Collector's Edition under the name Eternal Calm, Final Fantasy X-2: Prologue. It was first released in Europe on October 31, 2003, and featured English voice-overs.

The international and PAL versions include a bonus DVD called Beyond Final Fantasy, a disc including interviews with the game's developers, and two of the game's English voice actors, James Arnold Taylor (Tidus) and Hedy Burress (Yuna). Also included are trailers for Final Fantasy X and Kingdom Hearts, a concept and promotional art gallery for the game, and a music video of "Suteki da ne" performed by Rikki. In 2005, a compilation featuring Final Fantasy X and X-2 was released in Japan as Final Fantasy X/X-2 Ultimate Box.

Square also produced various types of merchandise and several books, including The Art of Final Fantasy X and three Ultimania guides, a series of artbooks/strategy guides published by DigiCube in Japan. They feature original artwork from Final Fantasy X, offer gameplay walkthroughs, expand upon many aspects of the game's storyline and feature several interviews with the game's designers. There are three books in the series: Final Fantasy X Scenario Ultimania, Final Fantasy X Battle Ultimania, and Final Fantasy X Ultimania Ω. The game was re-released as part of the Final Fantasy 25th Anniversary Ultimate Box release in December 2012.

=== HD Remaster ===
Final Fantasy X was re-released in high-definition for the PlayStation 3 and PlayStation Vita, in celebration of the game's 10-year anniversary. The remaster was released in December 2013 for Japan, and the following year in March for other markets. The production of the remaster started in January 2012. Producer Yoshinori Kitase was once again involved in the production, and wanted to work on its quality. Character models of Tidus, Yuna, Bahamut and Yojimbo were presented in HD quality. The remaster also included its sequel X-2, remastered in HD and they were released under the title Final Fantasy X/X-2 HD Remaster on a single Blu-ray disc game. It was sold separately on game cartridges on Vita in Japan and sold together in North America, Europe and Australia as a set, with FFX being on a cartridge and FFX-2 being included as a download voucher. Downloadable versions were available for both systems. The games contain all the content found in the International version, including Eternal Calm and Last Mission.

Final Fantasy X/X-2 HD Remaster was released for the PlayStation 4 worldwide in May 2015. It included enhanced graphics in full HD (1080p), the option to switch to the original soundtrack, and the ability to transfer save files from the PS3 and PS Vita versions. One year later, it was released for Windows via Steam on May 16. It includes an auto-save feature, five game boosters, three parameter changes, the option to skip FMVs/cinematics, 4K resolution support, audio settings and graphic options. A version for the Nintendo Switch and the Xbox One was released on April 16, 2019.

== Reception ==
Reception

Aggregate score
Aggregator	Score
Metacritic	92/100

Review scores
Publication	Score
Eurogamer	9/10
Famitsu	10/10, 9/10, 10/10, 10/10
Game Informer	9.75/10
GamePro	5/5
GameRevolution	A−
GameSpot	9.3/10
GameSpy	4.5/5
IGN	9.5/10

Award
Publication	Award
Japan Game Awards	Best Game Award

Final Fantasy X received critical acclaim from video game critics. The Japanese video game magazine Famitsu and Famitsu PS2 awarded the game a near-perfect 39/40 score. Another Japanese gaming magazine, The Play Station, gave the game a score of 29/30. Famitsu, Famitsu PS2, and The Play Station expressed particularly favorable responses toward the game's storyline, graphics, and movies. The game maintains a 92 out of 100 on Metacritic. Producer Shinji Hashimoto said that the overall reception to the game was "excellent", having received praise and awards from critics.

IGN's David Smith offered praise for the voice actors and the innovations in gameplay, particularly with the revised battle and summon systems, the option to change party members during battle, and the character development and inventory management systems. He also felt that the game's graphics had improved on its predecessors in every way possible, and that the game as a whole was "the best-looking game of the series [and] arguably the best-playing as well". Greg Kasavin of GameSpot praised the game's storyline, calling it surprisingly complex, its ending satisfying, and its avoidance of role-playing game clichés commendable with Tidus viewed as an appealing protagonist. He also lauded the music, feeling it was "diverse and well suited to the various scenes in the game". Similarly, GamePro described its character building system and battle system as "two of the best innovations in the series". The visuals of the game were commended by GameSpy's Raymond Padilla, who referred to them as "top-notch", as well as giving praise to the character models, backgrounds, cutscenes, and animations. The voice casting was praised by Game Revolution, who noted most of them were "above average" and called the music "rich".

Edge rated the game considerably lower, criticizing many aspects of the game for being tedious and uninnovative and describing the dialogue as "nauseating", particularly panning Tidus. Andrew Reiner of Game Informer criticized the game's linearity and that players were no longer able to travel the world by chocobo or control the airship. Eurogamer's Tom Bramwell noted that the game's puzzle segments were "depressing" and "superfluous", and that although the Sphere Grid was "a nice touch", it took up too much of the game. The linearity of the game was positively commented on by GamePro who stated that a player would not be required to participate in side-quests or the mini-game to reach the game's conclusion, finding some of them unappealing. Game Revolution complained that cutscenes could not be skipped, some even being too long.

=== Sales ===
Square initially expected the game to sell at least two million copies worldwide owing to the reduced PlayStation 2's fanbase, making it smaller than the last three released titles. However, within its first day of its release in Japan, more than 2.14 million units were shipped, including 1.4 to 1.5 million pre-orders. A million units were sold within hours, and first-day shipments were expected to generate ¥17.6 billion or $145,000,000 (equivalent to $264,000,000 in 2025) in sales revenue. These figures exceeded the performances of Final Fantasy VII and IX in a comparable period, and Final Fantasy X became the first PlayStation 2 game to reach two and four million sold copies. In October 2007, the game was listed as the 8th best-selling game for the PlayStation 2. Final Fantasy X sold over 2.43 million copies in Japan alone in 2001.

By June 2002, it had sold 5.07 million units worldwide, including 2.76 million in the Asia-Pacific region, 1.47 million in North America, and 840,000 in Europe. By March 2003, the game had sold 5.89 million units worldwide, including 2.87 million in Japan and 3.02 million abroad. It sold 6.6 million copies worldwide by January 2004. By July 2006, it had sold 2.3 million copies and earned $95 million in the United States ($152 million in 2025). Next Generation ranked it as the 11th highest-selling game launched for the PlayStation 2, Xbox or GameCube between January 2000 and July 2006 in that country. As of March 2013, the game had shipped over 8.5 million copies worldwide on PS2. As of 2017, the PS2 version of the game has sold over 8 million copies worldwide.

The "Ultimate Hits" bargain reissue of the game in September 2005 sold over 131,000 copies in Japan by the end of 2006. As of October 2013, Final Fantasy X and its sequel X-2 had together sold over 14 million copies worldwide on PlayStation 2.

=== Awards ===
Final Fantasy X received the Best Game Award from the Japan Game Awards for 2001–02. In GameSpot's "Best and Worst Awards" from 2001, it came seventh in the category "Top 10 Video Games of the Year", and won the "Best Story" and "Best Role-Playing Game" awards. The game also received a PlayStation 2 Game of the Year award nomination at the 2002 Golden Joystick Awards, but lost to Grand Theft Auto III. Readers of Famitsu magazine voted it the best game of all time in early 2006. Final Fantasy X came in fifth on IGN's "Top 25 PS2 Games of All Time" list in 2007 and sixth in "The Top 10 Best Looking PS2 Games of All Time". In a similar list by GameSpy, the game took the 21st place. 1UP.com listed its revelation during the ending as the third-biggest video game spoiler, while IGN ranked the ending as the fifth best pre-rendered cutscene. In a Reader's Choice made in 2006 by IGN, it ranked as the 60th-best video game. It was also named one of the 20 essential Japanese role-playing games by Gamasutra. It also placed 43rd in Game Informer's list of "The Top 200 Games of All Time". In 2004, Final Fantasy X was listed as one of the best games ever made by GameFAQs, while in November 2005 it was voted as the 12th "Best Game Ever". In a general overview of the series, both GamesRadar and IGN listed Final Fantasy X as the fourth best game. At the 6th Annual Interactive Achievement Awards in 2003, it was nominated for "Outstanding Achievement in Animation" and "Console Role-Playing Game of the Year". Readers from GameFaqs also voted it as Game of the Year during 2001. In 2008, readers of Dengeki magazine voted it the second best game ever made. It was voted first place in Famitsu's and Dengeki's polls of most tear-inducing games of all time.

== Legacy ==
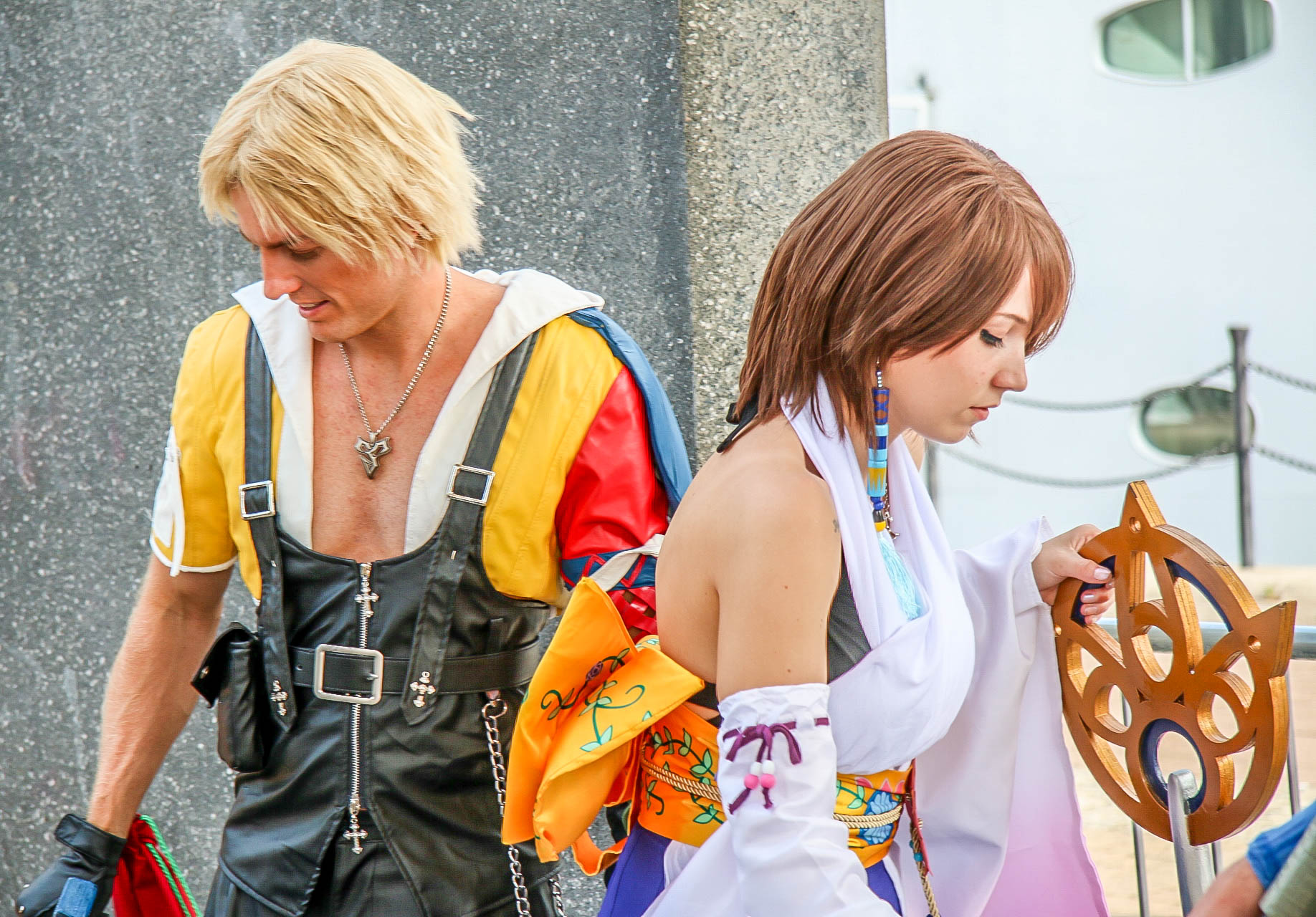
Final Fantasy X's success led to a cult following with many people cosplaying as the main characters.

Due to its commercial and critical success, Square Enix released a direct sequel to Final Fantasy X in 2003, titled Final Fantasy X-2. The sequel is set two years after the conclusion of Final Fantasy X, establishing new conflicts and dilemmas and resolving loose ends left by the original game. Although the sequel did not sell as well as the original, 5.4 million units versus over 8 million units, it can still be considered a commercial success. As a result of the title's popularity, Yoshinori Kitase and Kazushige Nojima decided to establish a plot-related connection between Final Fantasy X and Final Fantasy VII, another well-received Final Fantasy game. In 2013, after the release of the HD Remaster, Nojima said that he would like to see a second sequel to X, and if there were demand for it, it could happen. The minigame of blitzball has made it into other games, such as its sequel, and was mentioned as a possibility for Final Fantasy XIV: A Realm Reborn.

Mobius Final Fantasy, a game made by many key developers of the Final Fantasy X series including Kitase, Toriyama, Nojima, Watanabe and Takai, held an event titled Dream Within a Dream which told the story of what happened to Tidus between the events of Final Fantasy X and Final Fantasy X-2..

The advancements in portraying realistic emotions achieved with Final Fantasy X through voice-overs and detailed facial expressions have since become a staple of the series, with X-2 and other subsequent titles (such as Dirge of Cerberus: Final Fantasy VII, Final Fantasy XII, XIII and its sequels, and XV) also featuring this development. Traversing real-time 3D environments instead of an overworld map has also become a standard of the series. Final Fantasy X can be considered a pioneer in 3-D RPG maps. The Sphere Grid system of FFX had an influence on the action role-playing game Path of Exile (2013), along with the Materia system of Final Fantasy VII.

Both Tidus and Yuna have been popular characters in games due to their personalities and their romantic relationship. According to Square Enix producer Shinji Hashimoto, cosplays of the characters have been popular. Takeo Kujiraoka, director of Dissidia Final Fantasy NT, regarded Final Fantasy X as his favorite game from the franchise based on its emotional impact on the players as well as the multiple amount of playable content that surpasses 100 hours. Kujiraoka noted that the staff received multiple requests by fans to include Tidus' and Yuna's Will look as an alternative design but Nomura said it was not possible as the company would first need to develop Final Fantasy X-3.

In July 2021, Nomura revealed that the story for the potential sequel has been written by Nojima. Toriyama similarly expressed interest in returning to the world of Spira and said that it could potentially happen after finishing Final Fantasy VII Remake.

In addition, a kabuki stage adaptation of the game's story, Kinoshita Group presents New Kabuki Final Fantasy X, a collaboration between Square Enix and Tokyo Broadcasting System, was performed at the IHI Stage Around Tokyo from March 4 to April 12, 2023, with a cast including Kikunosuke Onoe as Tidus and Yonekichi Nakamura as Yuna.

In November 2025, Dragon Quest creator Yuji Horii said that he always viewed the Final Fantasy franchise as a type of games whose narrative include more talkative characters than his own franchise in contrast to his own silent protagonist meant to have immerse with the player. Horii recalls that when Final Fantasy X was released, he saw the franchise reaching "the ultimate perfection" of the series' formula. Among other entries in the Final Fantasy series, the creators of 2025's Clair Obscur: Expedition 33 cited X as an inspiration for the game.

As part of celebrations for Final Fantasy X's 25th anniversary, Square Enix released Nojima's Final Fantasy X-2.5 novella digitally for the first time.

Also in 2026, Nomura again expressed interest in working with the characters again to see how they are doing after all this time.

== See also ==
- List of Square Enix video game franchises
