= Glory of Heracles (video game) =

2009 video game

- North American box art
- Developers: Paon; Studio Saizensen
- Publisher: Nintendo
- Director: Toshinobu Kondō
- Producers: Toshiharu Izuno; Rikiya Nakagawa
- Artists: Yoshio Sugiura (illustrator); Tetsuhiko Kikuchi (character design)
- Writer: Kazushige Nojima
- Composers: Yoshitaka Hirota; Yuuichi Kanno
- Series: Glory of Heracles
- Platform: Nintendo DS
- Release: JP: May 22, 2008; NA: January 18, 2010
- Genre: Role-playing
- Mode: Single-player

Glory of Heracles (Note: Known in Japan as Hercules no Eikō: Tamashii no Shōmei (ヘラクレスの栄光 魂の証明; lit. 'Glory of Heracles: Proof of the Soul')) is a 2008 role-playing video game developed by Paon and published by Nintendo for the Nintendo DS. It is the sixth game of the Glory of Heracles series. It was originally released in Japan on May 22, 2008, and in North America on January 18, 2010, making it the only game in the series to be released outside Japan.

== Gameplay ==
Glory of Heracles incorporates a turn-based battle system. During battle, the player's party and the opponents are positioned on a five column, two row grid. The front row allows characters to perform powerful melee attacks, while the back row is for ranged attacks, which can be either bows or magic spells. The order of attack is generally determined by the Agility of each character, but the order can be changed with certain spells or effects. The main feature of the battle system is the ability to power up offensive spells and skills by completing a small puzzle by inputting commands on the touch screen. The player can learn new skills and magic by visiting temples or Prometheus statues, respectively. Equipment will also provide the player's party with more abilities.

Ether is the source of magic in the game. Every spell adds or subtracts a set amount of Ether. There are five different elements of Ether in the game, known as Fire, Wind, Earth, Ice, and Dark. Any spell using Dark Ether will restore elemental ether, and vice versa. Ether restores after every turn of combat, and at the end of battles. If there is insufficient Ether for the spell, the difference is subtracted from the character's HP – this is referred to as Ether Reflux.

== Plot ==
Glory of Heracles takes place in ancient Greece and other parts of the Mediterranean region, with the plot drawing heavily from Greek mythology. The player names and assumes the role of the silent protagonist, though he speaks in battle, an immortal, amnesiac boy who is accompanied by the characters Leucos, Axios, Heracles and Eris on their journey to remember their pasts and to discover why they are immortal. Throughout the plot, the characters' stories become intertwined with other mythological figures and events such as Achilles and the Trojan War. The Taphus, an invention designed by Daedalus, is a recurring plot device which was punished by Zeus for extracting Ether from the world. Kazushige Nojima, the game's scenario writer, commented that the Japanese subtitle Tamashii no Shoumei ("proof of the soul") was central to one of the game's themes and that the player had to discover its meaning. The theme of an amnesiac cast was explored previously in Heracles no Eikou III, which was also written by Nojima.

== Development ==
The game was greenlit when Nintendo attempted to brainstorm ideas for a role-playing video game for the Nintendo DS, only to be interested by the idea of a new Glory of Heracles game; Nintendo would contact Paon to license the intellectual property and develop a new game in the series.

Much of the actual development was contracted to Studio Saizensen, with the director of the game Toshinobu Kondō being the studio's founder. Kazushige Nojima, known for writing several installments of the Final Fantasy series, helped to write the game's scenario.

Japanese publications such as Famitsu stated that the speed during combat was quite sluggish. The American release addressed this issue by increasing the battle speed.

== Reception ==
Reception

Aggregate scores
Aggregator	Score
GameRankings	71%
Metacritic	69/100

Review scores
Publication	Score
GameSpot	6.5/10
GameTrailers	6.8/10
IGN	6/10
Nintendo Power	7/10
RPGamer	3/5

Glory of Heracles received mostly positive reviews. RPGamer was critical of the dungeon designs and combat, and labeled the game "average". Adriaan den Ouden posted a review saying: "Glory of Heracles isn't going to win any gold medals, but cheer for it anyways. It certainly tries hard". Patrick Gann of RPGFan was largely positive and seemed to express fears of the game keeping a low profile; he urged in his closing remarks: "I approached this game with cautious optimism and was rewarded for giving it a chance. I would ask that you do the same". He also noted the high quality of the game's localization in his final remarks.
