= Nightmare in the Dark =

2000 video game

- Developer: AM Factory (Note: Additional work by Paon.)
- Publishers: JP: Eleven, Gavaking; NA/EU: SNK
- Director: Akihiko Utō
- Programmers: Hisanori Takeuchi; Tatsuya Watanabe
- Artists: Hiroshi Yokoyama; Masayuki Taguchi; Taketumi Watanabe
- Platform: Arcade
- Release: WW: 27 January 2000
- Genre: Platform
- Modes: Single-player, multiplayer
- Arcade system: Neo Geo MVS

Nightmare in the Dark (Note: Japanese: ナイトメア･イン･ザ･ダーク, Hepburn: Naitomea in za Dāku) is a platform arcade game developed by AM Factory, with the assistance of Paon, and released by Eleven/Gavaking on January 27, 2000. The game never received an official release for either the Neo Geo AES (home) or Neo Geo CD platforms. It concerns the story of a grave keeper discovering graves being desecrated and his attempt to prevent the graverobbers from inflicting further damage.

== Gameplay ==
Gameplay screenshot

A grave keeper goes around graveyards protecting them from evil doers. The player clears the area and collects power-ups using them to eliminate the enemies. There are five stages with five levels each, and each one of them has you throwing fireballs at ghouls, ghosts, goblins, and zombies. Similar to Snow Bros., when the players keep throwing fireballs at these enemies, they will ignite into a bigger ball, which the players can throw at other enemies to kill them, and get the remaining treasure before moving on to the next level. A difference from Snow Bros. is that that game produces power-ups from fallen enemies rolled over by a launched big ball, whereas this game produces power-ups items directly from a launched big ball upon its destruction. Enemies that are killed by big balls in this game only gives gems that boosts the player's score, but scoring means little, as this game's extra life system is not score-based. To obtain power-ups in this game the player must turn as many enemies into big balls, then launch them separately. Once launched, big balls are eventually destroyed when they hit the edge of platforms, releasing a power-up. Also unlike Snow Bros., not all items are beneficial: there is an item that is detrimental to the player by stripping away all powers they previously collected upon consumption. At the end of the fourth level, a boss must be defeated in order to continue the game. Upon defeat, all sorts of items are released en masse from the fallen boss' body. There is an extra life item in the form of a piece of meat that only appears at this time.

== Plot ==
There lived one grave watcher (although this game is a 2-players co-op game, the story states one grave watcher) with magical power at a very small village in a remote region. He lived a quiet, solitary life in a corner of the cemetery. He kept away from the village people due to his very ugly appearance. One day, he found the graves were ransacked and some corpses were stolen. He didn't want the village people to find out, so he decided to eliminate the grave burglars by himself. Thus, he patrolled the cemetery every night.

He found out that a powerful Wizard has been stealing corpses to build his army of undead to terrorize the village. He then took himself to eliminate the Wizard once and for all.

After defeating the Wizard, he returns to his solitary life. Eventually, the villagers find out about his bravery in protecting them from the menace of the Wizard and go to his house and express their gratitude to him.

== Reception ==
In 2023 Time Extension identified Nightmare in the Dark as one of the best games for the Neo Geo.
