= Kazushige Nojima =

Japanese video game writer (born 1964)

- 野島 一成
- Born: January 20, 1964 (age 62); Sapporo, Hokkaido, Japan
- Occupations: Game designer, writer
- Years active: 1984–present
- Employers: Data East (1984–1994); Square (1994–2003); Stellavista (2003–present)

Kazushige Nojima (野島 一成, Nojima Kazushige; born January 20, 1964) is a Japanese video game writer. He is best known for writing several installments of Square Enix's Final Fantasy franchise—namely Final Fantasy VII and its spin-offs Advent Children and Crisis Core, Final Fantasy VIII, and Final Fantasy X and X-2—in addition to the Kingdom Hearts series, the Glory of Heracles series, and the story to the Subspace Emissary mode in Super Smash Bros. Brawl. Nojima also wrote the original lyrics of "Liberi Fatali" for Final Fantasy VIII and both "Suteki da Ne" and the "Hymn of the Fayth" for Final Fantasy X, as well as "No Promises to Keep" for Final Fantasy VII Rebirth. He is also the founder of Stellavista Ltd.

== Biography ==
Kazushige Nojima first joined Japanese video game developer and publisher Data East.

=== Square Co. ===
He joined Square in 1994. He began work on Final Fantasy VII after the main character settings were done, though Nojima considered this early in the process; he was still working on Bahamut Lagoon.

Nojima also wrote the mythology of Fabula Nova Crystallis, which has been used as the story foundation for all the titles within the series. Nojima also wrote a number of the Kingdom Hearts games. He also wrote the scenario for Final Fantasy XV (Previously known as Versus XIII).

=== Freelance ===
Kazushige Nojima left Square Enix in 2003 and founded Stellavista Ltd, a freelance scenario company. He wrote the story for Sakura Note. He also contributed some story concepts to the script of Final Fantasy XIII. While developing the scenario for Glory of Heracles, Nojima took inspiration from the Fall of Troy and the Battle of Thermopylae. Not many actual Greek locations were used, but locations derived from Greek mythology were.

In 2011 Enterbrain announced on its Famitsu resource that a short anime and audio drama, based on a novel written by Kazushige Nojima, will be streamed with a name Busō Chūgakusei Basket Army (Armed Middle School Student Basket Army).

== Writing style and reception ==
Nojima has been called one of the "strongest voices" in the video game industry for his writing. His stories have been noted for their complexity and fearlessness in delving into romantic plot lines.

== Works ==
=== Video games ===
- Tantei Jingūji Saburō: Kiken na Futari (1988) – Scenario writer
- Hercules no Eikō II: Titan no Metsubō (1989) – Scenario writer
- Tantei Jingūji Saburō: Toki no Sugiyuku mamani... (1991) – Scenario writer
- Heracles no Eikō III: Kamigami no Chinmoku (1992) – Scenario writer
- Heracles no Eikō IV: Kamigami kara no Okurimono (1994) – Director, scenario writer
- Bahamut Lagoon (1996) – Director
- Final Fantasy VII (1997) – Event planner, story
- Final Fantasy VIII (1999) – Scenario writer
- Final Fantasy X (2001) – Scenario writer
- Kingdom Hearts (2002) – Scenario writer
- Final Fantasy X-2 (2003) – Scenario writer
- Before Crisis: Final Fantasy VII (2004) – Scenario supervisor
- Kingdom Hearts: Chain of Memories (2004) – Scenario supervisor
- Kingdom Hearts II (2005) – Scenario writer
- Crisis Core: Final Fantasy VII (2007) – Scenario writer
- Super Smash Bros. Brawl (2008) – The Subspace Emissary scenario writer
- Glory of Hercules (2008) – Scenario writer
- Sakura Note (2009) – Scenario writer
- Final Fantasy XIII (2009) – Scenario concept
- Last Ranker (2010) – Scenario writer
- Lord of Arcana (2010) – Original lyrics
- Black Rock Shooter: The Game (2011) – Scenario writer
- Sol Trigger (2012) – Scenario writer
- Final Fantasy X/X-2 HD Remaster (2013) – Scenario writer, audio drama writer
- Zodiac: Orcanon Odyssey (2015) – Scenario writer
- Mobius Final Fantasy (2015) – Scenario writer
- Dragon's Dogma Online (2015) – Scenario writer
- Final Fantasy XV (2016) – Original story plot
- Itadaki Street: Dragon Quest and Final Fantasy 30th Anniversary (2017) – Scenario supervisor
- Dissidia Final Fantasy NT (2018) – Scenario concept
- Final Fantasy XV: Pocket Edition (2018) – Original story plot
- Kingdom Hearts III (2019) – Scenario supervisor
- Final Fantasy VII Remake (2020) – Story, scenario writer, lyricist
- Astria Ascending (2021) – Story, scenario writer
- Final Fantasy VII: The First Soldier (2021) – Scenario supervisor
- Stranger of Paradise: Final Fantasy Origin (2022) – Story, scenario writer
- Crisis Core: Final Fantasy VII Reunion (2022) – Scenario writer
- Final Fantasy VII: Ever Crisis (2023) – Story, scenario writer
- Final Fantasy VII Rebirth (2024) – Story, scenario writer
- Reynatis (2024) – Scenario writer

=== Novels ===
- Final Fantasy VII: On the Way to a Smile (2005-2009) – Writer
- Final Fantasy VII The Kids Are Alright: A Turks Side Story (2011) – Writer
- Final Fantasy X-2.5 ~Eien no Daishō~ (2013) – Writer
- Basket Army (2013) – Writer
- Final Fantasy VII Remake: Traces of Two Pasts (2021) – Writer
- Final Fantasy VII Rebirth: Dear Destiny (2026) – Writer

=== Film ===
- Final Fantasy VII: Advent Children (2005) – Scenario writer

=== Anime ===
- Last Order: Final Fantasy VII (2005) – Story
- Lupin the 3rd Part V (2018) – Episode 12 screenplay
