= Glory of Heracles =

Role-playing video game series

- Genre: Role-playing
- Developers: Data East; Paon DP
- Publishers: Data East; Nintendo
- Platforms: Nintendo Entertainment System, Game Boy, Nintendo DS
- First release: Tōjin Makyō Den: Hercules no Eikō; June 12, 1987
- Latest release: Glory of Heracles; May 22, 2008

Glory of Heracles (Japanese: ヘラクレスの栄光, Hepburn: Herakuresu no Eikō) is a role-playing video game series initially developed and published by Data East. The series itself is now owned by Paon DP while trademark to the English name Glory of Heracles belongs to Nintendo which also has copyright to the latest game in the franchise.

The series began in 1987 with Tōjin Makyō Den: Hercules no Eikō, and three sequels were released until 1994 in addition to a portable spin-off game released in 1992. Nintendo released the latest installment in the series, Heracles no Eikō: Tamashii no Shōmei for the Nintendo DS in 2008. None of the games had been released outside Japan until E3 2009, at which the latest game was announced by Nintendo as Glory of Heracles.

The series is based in the world of Greek mythology, with the Greek hero Heracles as the title character of each game. However, Heracles only serves as the main character in the original game and the Game Boy spin-off, and plays a support role in all subsequent games.

== Games ==
Game	Details
Tōjin Makyō Den: Hercules no Eikō Original release date(s): JP: June 12, 1987	Release years by system: Famicom
Tōjin Makyō Den: Hercules no Eikō Original release date(s): JP: June 12, 1987	Notes: Tōjin Makyō Den: Hercules no Eikō (闘人魔境伝 ヘラクレスの栄光; "Legend of the Fighting Demon's Lair: Glory of Heracles") is the first game of the series. The player takes the role of a young Heracles who seeks to rescue Venus from captivity in Hades.
Hercules no Eikō II: Titan no Metsubō Original release date(s): JP: December 23, 1989	Release years by system: Famicom
Hercules no Eikō II: Titan no Metsubō Original release date(s): JP: December 23, 1989	Notes: Hercules no Eikō II: Titan no Metsubō (ヘラクレスの栄光II タイタンの滅亡; "Glory of Heracles II: Titan's Downfall") is the second game of the series. Unlike the first game in the series, Heracles is no longer the player-controlled character. The party system is introduced, along with time-flow, where the game passes between daytime and nighttime. Though no longer containing a particularly unique game system, Heracles no Eikō II is characterized by its tragic, dramatic storyline, which employs various motifs from Greek mythology. The game's scenario was written by Kazushige Nojima.
Hercules no Eikō III: Kamigami no Chinmoku Original release date(s): Super Famicom: JP: April 24, 1992; Wii Virtual Console: JP: April 6, 2007; Wii U Virtual Console: JP: May 22, 2013; Mobile phone: JP: July 14, 2008; Nintendo Switch: JP: October 29, 2020	Release years by system: Super Famicom, Virtual Console, mobile phone
Hercules no Eikō III: Kamigami no Chinmoku Original release date(s): Super Famicom: JP: April 24, 1992; Wii Virtual Console: JP: April 6, 2007; Wii U Virtual Console: JP: May 22, 2013; Mobile phone: JP: July 14, 2008; Nintendo Switch: JP: October 29, 2020	Notes: Hercules no Eikō III: Kamigami no Chinmoku (ヘラクレスの栄光III 神々の沈黙; "Glory of Heracles III: Silence of the Gods") is the third installment of the series. Initially published for the Super Famicom, it was released on the Japanese Virtual Console in 2007 by Paon and on mobile phone in 2008 by G-Mode. The hero begins the game in a state of total memory loss, but discovers that he has acquired a mysterious power that shields him from bodily harm, essentially making him immortal. An immortal character can execute certain actions that other characters cannot, like jumping off high cliffs without being injured.
Hercules no Eikō: Ugokidashita Kamigami Original release date(s): Game Boy: JP: December 27, 1992; 3DS Virtual Console: JP: August 24, 2011	Release years by system: Game Boy, 3DS Virtual Console
Hercules no Eikō: Ugokidashita Kamigami Original release date(s): Game Boy: JP: December 27, 1992; 3DS Virtual Console: JP: August 24, 2011	Notes: Hercules no Eikō: Ugokidashita Kamigami - The Snap-Story (ヘラクレスの栄光 動き出した神々 The Snap-Story; "Glory of Heracles: The Gods Began to Move - The Snap-Story") is the fourth game of the series and is the only spinoff of the series. It is the only other game in the series that features Heracles as the main playable character. The story is set shortly after the events of the first game, where Heracles is summoned by Zeus to prevent the resurrection of Cronus by Bloodlord and his minions. The battle system is like that of the first game, where Heracles is limited to attacking, defending and using items, but during a fight the player can be assisted by a God which they have chosen to accompany Heracles. Gods do not level up, but they usually have high stats and powerful magic. As the player levels up, they can gain another God they can bring with them from Olympus, but they are only allowed to take one at a time.
Hercules no Eikō IV: Kamigami kara no Okurimono Original release date(s): Super Famicom: JP: October 21, 1994; Wii Virtual Console: JP: April 22, 2008; Wii U Virtual Console: JP: February 10, 2015	Release years by system: Super Famicom, Virtual Console
Hercules no Eikō IV: Kamigami kara no Okurimono Original release date(s): Super Famicom: JP: October 21, 1994; Wii Virtual Console: JP: April 22, 2008; Wii U Virtual Console: JP: February 10, 2015	Notes: Hercules no Eikō IV: Kamigami kara no Okurimono (ヘラクレスの栄光IV 神々からの贈り物; "Glory of Heracles IV: Gift from the Gods") is the fifth installment of the series (fourth game in the main series), released after the portable spinoff Heracles no Eikō: Ugokidashita Kamigami. The game was made available for the Virtual Console in 2008. The player takes the role of a young man whose spirit was separated from his body. The game's plot and setting are very loosely based around various episodes from Greek mythology, with a particular focus on Atlantis and the tale of Pandora's box. In addition to writing the scenario, Kazushige Nojima was also the director for this game.
Glory of Heracles Original release date(s): JP: May 22, 2008; NA: January 18, 2010	Release years by system: Nintendo DS
Glory of Heracles Original release date(s): JP: May 22, 2008; NA: January 18, 2010	Notes: Glory of Heracles, known as Hercules no Eikō: Tamashii no Shōmei (ヘラクレスの栄光 魂の証明; "Glory of Heracles: Proof of the Soul") in Japan, was developed by Paon and published by Nintendo in 2008 for the Nintendo DS. This is the first entry in the series that was not developed by Data East and the first to be published by Nintendo as a first party property, however, former Data East employees and writers of Heracles no Eikō II, III and IV again wrote the scenario. Revealed at E3 2009, the fifth game would be the first in the series to make an international release in 2010.
