= Paula Tiso =

American voice actress

- Born: United States
- Occupation: Voice actress
- Years active: 1989–present
- Spouse: Paul Mercier
- Website: paulatiso.com

Paula Tiso is an American voice actress. She works in many areas of voiceover including Documentary narration, Affiliate TV, Radio Imaging, commercial voiceover as well as video games and live-action dubbing.

She has narrated the true crime Oxygen series Living With a Serial Killer, season 2 and the ID channel series The Devil Speaks, as well as various series on the History Channel and the Smithsonian Channel, including the documentary series Genghis Khan's Mongolia.

Tiso also works in video games, appearing in Fallout 76 and Lego The Incredibles, and is known for voicing Lulu in Final Fantasy X and Final Fantasy X-2, and Sylvia Christel in the No More Heroes series of games.

== Filmography ==
=== Television ===
Year	Title	Role	Notes
1989	CBS Schoolbreak Special	Hostess	Episode: "Words to Live By"
1994	Mighty Max	Caitlin	Episode: "Fuath and Beggora"
1996	Dexter's Laboratory	Agent Honeydew	Episode: "Dial M for Monkey: Simion"
2003	The Grim Adventures of Billy & Mandy	Atrocia	Episode: "The Grim Show"
2004	Static Shock	Counter Girl	Episode: "Now You See Him..."
2004	As Told by Ginger	Polly Shuster	Episode: "Butterflies Are Free"
2006	Rugrats Tales from the Crib: Three Jacks and a Beanstalk	Henny Penny	Direct-to-video special

=== Anime ===
- .hack//Legend of the Twilight – Ohka
- Burn-Up Excess – Ruby / Wife / Passenger
- Geneshaft – Alice / Karen / Mir Lotus
- Kaze No Yojimbo – Maki
- Snack World – Additional voices
- Vampire Princess Miyu – Kasumi Kimihara

=== Video games ===
Year	Title	Role	Notes
1995	Labyrinth of Crete	Iris	
1999	Sword of the Berserk: Guts' Rage	Rita, Annette	
2001	JumpStart SpyMasters: Unmask the Prankster	Jess, Jo	
2001	Final Fantasy X	Lulu	
2002	Eternal Darkness	Chandra	
2003	Final Fantasy X-2	Lulu	
2004	La Pucelle: Tactics	Papillion	
2004	EverQuest II	Various voices	
2005	Destroy All Humans!	Additional voices	
2005	Dungeons & Dragons: Dragonshard	Various voices	
2006	Syphon Filter: Dark Mirror	Blake Hargrove	
2006	Neopets: Petpet Adventures: The Wand of Wishing	Megan	
2006	Destroy All Humans! 2	Additional voices	
2006	Metal Gear Solid: Portable Ops	Female Scientist	
2007	No More Heroes	Sylvia Christel	
2008	Destroy All Humans! Big Willy Unleashed	Mindy Peters	
2008	Metal Gear Solid 4: Guns of the Patriots	Laughing Octopus	
2009	Final Fantasy XIII	Jihl Nabaat	
2010	No More Heroes 2: Desperate Struggle	Sylvia Christel	
2011	The Lord of the Rings: War in the North	Elaure	
2011	Saints Row: The Third	Additional voices	
2011	Final Fantasy XIII-2	Jihl Nabaat	
2013	Saints Row IV	Additional voices	
2018	Lego The Incredibles	Sally Sundae	
2018	The Wonderful 101	Vijounne	
2018	Fallout 76	Duchess, Ella Ames, Geraldine Fitzsimmons, Gladys Filtcher, Executioner, Cultist	
2021	No More Heroes III	Sylvia Christel	
