= Rio Natsuki =

Japanese voice actress and singer (born 1969)

- 夏樹 リオ
- Born: March 5, 1969 (age 57); Tokyo, Japan
- Occupations: Voice actress, singer
- Years active: 1991–present
- Agent: aptepro

Rio Natsuki (夏樹 リオ, Natsuki Rio; born March 5, 1969) is a Japanese voice actress and singer.

== Notable voice roles ==
=== Anime ===
- Angelic Layer (Tsubasa McEnzie)
- Battle Athletes series (Akari Kanzaki)
- Bubblegum Crisis Tokyo 2040 (Linna Yamazaki)
- Carnival Phantasm (Sion Eltnam Atlasia)
- Digimon Adventure 02 (Miyako Inoue)
- Domain of Murder (Hitomi Sagawa)
- El-Hazard (Nanami Jinnai)
- Full Metal Panic! (Eri Kagurazaka)
- Geneshaft (Gloria, Ryoko Banning, Sybil)
- GetBackers (Hevn)
- Macross 7 (Miho Miho)
- Pokémon (Asuna)
- Rockman EXE Axess (Silk)
- Shugo Chara! (Yukari Sanjou)
- Skip Beat! (Shouko Aki)
- Super Robot Wars Original Generation: The Animation (Rio Mei Long)
- Super Robot Wars Original Generation: Divine Wars (Rio Mei Long)
- Tenchi Muyo! Ryo-Ohki (Rea Masaki)
- The Snow Queen (Kai)
- To Heart 2 (Ruko Kireinasora/Lucy Maria Misora)
- Turn A Gundam (Merrybell Gadget)
- Tweeny Witches (Head)
- Ultraviolet: Code 044 (Mother, Citizens)
- Digimon Adventure (2020) (Valkyrimon)

=== Video games ===
- Atelier Lilie: The Alchemist of Salburg 3 (Ziska Villa)
- Battle Athletes (Akari Kazaki)
- Dirge of Cerberus: Final Fantasy VII (Lucrecia Crescent)
- Dissidia Final Fantasy Opera Omnia (Fujin, Lulu)
- Final Fantasy VII: Ever Crisis (Alissa)
- Final Fantasy X (Lulu, Bahamut's Fayth)
- Final Fantasy X-2 (Lulu)
- Kingdom Hearts II (Fuu)
- GioGio's Bizarre Adventure (Trish Una)
- Gran Turismo 5 (Japanese version) (Car introduction narrator)
- Melty Blood (Sion Eltnam Atlasia, Sion TATARI & Dust of Osiris, announcer of Actress Again)
- Shenmue (Etsuko Sekine)
- Shenmue II (Joy)
- Snowboard Kids Plus (Kaede)
- Summon Night Twin Age: Seireitachi no Koe (Lila)
- Super Robot Wars series (Rio Mei Long, Merrybell Gadget, Miho Miho, Audrey)
- To Heart 2 (Ruko Kireinasora/Lucy Maria Misora)
- Zone of the Enders (Elena Weinberg)

=== Dubbing roles ===
- Fairly OddParents - Wanda
- The Tudors - Catherine Howard
