= New Horizon (textbook) =

Japanese English language textbook

New Horizon is an English language textbook used by junior high school students in Japan. It first came out in 1966. It is published by Tokyo Shoseki. There are three volumes, one for each of the three years of junior high school in Japan. As of 2003, around 40% of schools were using New Horizon as their English textbook.

== Characters ==
There are several characters whose adventures centered on the fictional Wakaba Junior High School inspire the books' grammar and vocabulary lessons. These characters, updated in the revised 2006 edition of the text, are as follows:

- Judy Brown – An African-American girl from New York.
- Emi Ito (伊藤 絵美 Itō Emi) – A young Japanese girl.
- Shin Tanaka (田中 慎 Tanaka Shin) – A young Japanese boy.
- Mike Davis – A young Australian.
- Lisa – Ms. Green's sister who lives in Toronto, Canada.
- Koji (浩司 Kōji) – Lisa's Japanese husband.
- Bill – Ms. Green's little brother.
- Bin – Koji's Chinese friend.

Their teachers are a Canadian Assistant Language Teacher (ALT) named Ann Green and Kazuko Sato (佐藤 和子 Satō Kazuko), a Japanese woman who is mostly ignored by the authors. The 2006 edition has only minor changes from the previous edition; e.g., there are T-shirts on sale instead of shoes, and the kids visit Canada instead of Australia.

In April 2016, new characters and visuals in the fictional Midori (green) High School are introduced:

- Saki Andou (安藤咲 Andou Saki) – A first year student in the Judo (柔道) club.
- Haruki Andou (安藤春樹 Andou Haruki) – Saki's older brother who studies in an Australian University.
- Becky Jones – Born in Australia and met Saki during the school's cultural festival.
- Kouta Ito (伊藤光太 Ito Kouta) – A first year student in the soccer club.
- Emi Ito (伊藤絵美 Ito Emi) – Kouta's older sister.
- Paulo Fernandes – Born in Brazil, the coach of the soccer team.
- Deepa Mitra – Born in India, first year student. She loves music and is in the school's band.
- Alex Green – Born in Canada, first year student. He joins the dance team of the Japanese culture club.

Their ALT is named Ellen Baker who was born in Boston, USA. Her brother Mike works in a Chinese cuisine restaurant in Japan. Mary Brown is her friend who also hails from Boston.

== Popular culture ==
The appearance of Ellen Baker went viral, with much fan art causing concern to the original artist, prompting him to call for restraint on her fans.

== See also ==
- English textbooks in use in Japan
  - Sunshine
  - New Crown
  - Total English
