= Paon DP =

Japanese video game development company

Paon DP Co., Ltd.
- Type: Private
- Industry: Video games
- Predecessors: Paon Corporation, Ltd. DP Inc.
- Founded: August 3, 2004; 22 years ago
- Headquarters: Kita, Tokyo, Japan
- Key people: Kaishun Kihara (president and CEO); Ken Yamamoto (vice-president); Nobuo Iwata; Rikiya Nakagawa; Tatsuya Watanabe (former presidents of Paon); Iwao Horita (former vice-president of Paon)
- Number of employees: 44 (as of 2023)
- Website: paon-dp.com

Paon DP Co., Ltd. (株式会社パオン・ディーピー) is a Japanese video game developer. The company was founded in August 2004 as DP Inc. and merged with Paon Corporation, Ltd. in March 2015 to form Paon DP.

Paon Corporation was founded on January 20, 1999. Through a partnership with Nintendo, Paon developed DK: King of Swing, Donkey Kong: Barrel Blast and DK: Jungle Climber. Paon was also involved in development of 2000 SNK's Neo Geo Pocket Color fighting game titles, SNK Gals' Fighters as composer and sound work team, as well as composer to some other Neo Geo Pocket Color titles.

When the company Data East went bankrupt, Paon Corporation bought the rights to some of their games, including Karnov, Chelnov and Windjammers, as well as the Glory of Heracles and Kuuga series, all of which are now owned by Paon DP. Paon developed Glory of Heracles in 2008, the sixth title of the Glory of Heracles series, which was published by Nintendo. The rights to that game are split between Paon and Nintendo with the latter owning the trademark as well.

In 2010, the company entered into the business of mobile game development.

Paon merged with DP Co., Ltd. on March 1, 2015 to form Paon DP. An associate company of pachislot maker Daito Giken, (since the company's chairman is the same as Daito Giken).

As a result of the merger, DP became the surviving entity while Paon Corporation was dissolved. The new company now develops mobile games only to Japan, as well as often licensing their owned properties, in 2017, Paon DP moved its headquarters to Kita, Tokyo.

A large amount of developers who were previously at Paon ended up at another Japanese video game developer called Picola Co., Ltd., which was formed at the same time as the Paon/DP merger in February 2015 and later co-developed the game Little Dragons Café, a cafe-management and dragon-raising simulator that was released for Microsoft Windows, PlayStation 4 and Nintendo Switch in 2018.

== Games developed, co-developed, licensed, published or co-published by Paon DP ==
- Dino Crisis (1999, Capcom (WW)/Virgin Interactive (PAL), PlayStation, Dreamcast, Windows)
- Puzzle Link 2 (1999, SNK, Neo Geo Pocket Color)
- Nightmare in the Dark (2000, Eleven, Gavaking (JP)/SNK (US), Arcade)
- SNK Gals' Fighters (2000, SNK, Neo Geo Pocket Color)
- Big Bang Pro Wrestling (2000, SNK, Neo Geo Pocket Color)
- Adventure of Tokyo Disney Sea: Ushinawareta Hōseki no Himitsu (2001, Konami, PlayStation 2)
- Lowrider (2002, Pacific Century Cyber Works (JP)/Jaleco (US), PlayStation 2)
- Tenchu: Wrath of Heaven (2003, Software (JP)/Activision (US), PlayStation 2)
- The Wild Rings (2003, Microsoft Game Studios, Xbox)
- Fire ProWresting Z (2003, Spike, PlayStation 2)
- Dragon Ball Z: Budokai 2 (2003, Bandai (JP)/Atari (WW), PlayStation 2, GameCube)
- After... Wasureenu Kizuna (2004, Pionesoft, PlayStation 2, Dreamcast)
- Tenchu: Return from Darkness (2004, FromSoftware (JP)/Activision (US), Xbox)
- Blood Will Tell (2004, Sega, PlayStation 2)
- Daito Giken Kōshiki Pachi-Slot Simulator: Yoshimune (2004, Daito Giken, Inc., PlayStation 2)
- Dragon Quest & Final Fantasy in Itadaki Street Special (2004, Square Enix, PlayStation 2)
- DK: King of Swing (2005, Nintendo, Game Boy Advance)
- Saint Seiya: The Sanctuary (2005, Bandai, PlayStation 2)
- Haunting Ground (2005, Capcom, PlayStation 2)
- Trapt (2005, Tecmo, PlayStation 2)
- Daito Giken Kōshiki Pachi-Slot Simulator: Ossu! Banchō (2005, Daito Giken, Inc., PlayStation 2, PlayStation Portable)
- Harukanaru Toki no Naka de 3 (2005, Koei, PlayStation 2)
- Saint Seiya: The Hades (2006, Namco Bandai Games, PlayStation 2)
- Daito Giken Kōshiki Pachi-Slot Simulator: Yoshimune - Portable (2006, Daito Giken, Inc., PlayStation Portable)
- Daito Giken Premium Pachi-Slot Collection: Yoshimune (2006, Daito Giken, Inc., PlayStation 2)
- Daito Giken Kōshiki Pachi-Slot Simulator: Hihōden (2006, Daito Giken, Inc., PlayStation 2)
- Daito Giken Kōshiki Pachi-Slot Simulator: Hihōden - Ossu! Banchō - Yoshimune DS (2007, Nintendo DS)
- Donkey Kong Barrel Blast (2007, Nintendo, Wii)
- Atomic Runner Chelnov (2007, Wii)
- Herakles no Eikō III: Kamigami no Chinmoku (2007, Wii)
- Daito Giken Kōshiki Pachi-Slot Simulator: Shake II (2007, PlayStation 2)
- DK: Jungle Climber (2007, Nintendo, Nintendo DS)
- Super Smash Bros. Brawl (2008, Nintendo, Wii)
- Daito Giken Kōshiki Pachi-Slot Simulator: Shin Yoshimune (2008, PlayStation 2)
- Herakles no Eikō IV: Kamigami no Okurimono (2008, Wii)
- New Horizon English Course 1 (2008, Nintendo DS)
- New Horizon English Course 2 (2008, Nintendo DS)
- New Horizon English Course 3 (2008, Nintendo DS)
- Glory of Heracles (2008, Nintendo, Nintendo DS)
- Herakles no Eikō III: Kamigami no Chinmoku (2008, G-Mode, J2ME, BREW, Doja)
- Daito Giken Koushiki Pachislot Simulator: 24-Twenty-Four (2008, PlayStation 2)
- Klonoa (2008, Namco (JP)/Namco Bandai Games (US), Wii)
- Zettai Zetsumei Toshi 3: Kowareyuku Machi to Kanojo no Uta (2009, Irem, PlayStation Portable)
- Elevator Action: Death Parade (2009, Taito, Arcade)
- Windjammers (2010, Wii)
- Daito Giken Kōshiki Pachi-Slot Simulator: Ossu! Misao - Maguro Densetsu Portable (2010, PlayStation Portable)
- AquaSpace (2010, Nintendo, WiiWare)
- Daito Giken Kōshiki Pachi-Slot Simulator: Hana to Ikimono Rittai Zukan (2011, Nintendo 3DS)
- Herakles no Eikō: Ugokidashita Kamigami (2011, Nintendo 3DS)
- Time and Eternity (2012, Namco Bandai Games (JP)/NIS America (US), PlayStation 3)
- Daito Giken Kōshiki Pachi-Slot Simulator: Hihōden - Taiyō o Motomeru Monotachi (2013, PlayStation 3)
- Herakles no Eikō III: Kamigami no Chinmoku (2013, Wii U)
- Mario & Luigi: Dream Team (2013, Nintendo, Nintendo 3DS)
- Natural Doctrine (2014, Kadokawa Games (JP)/NIS America (US), PlayStation 3, PlayStation Vita, PlayStation 4)
- Scratch Pirates (2014, iOS, Android)
- Herakles no Eikō IV: Kamigami no Okurimono (2015, Wii U)
- The Legend of Heroes: Trails in the Sky FC Evolution (2015, Kadokawa Games, Nihon Falcom, PlayStation Vita)
- Bamon Kingdom Ω (2015, iOS, Android)
- Dribato! -Dream Card Battle- (2015, Android)
- Wonder Oracle (2016, iOS, Android)
- World of Summoners (2016, iOS, Android)
- Prone Position (2017, iOS)
- Windjammers (2017, PlayStation Vita, Nintendo Switch, PlayStation 4)
- Alien Egg (2017, iOS, Android)
- Nyanko on the Island of Hoshino (2018, iOS, Android)
- Gotsuan Legend (2019, iOS)
- There is a Strain (2020, iOS)
- Herakles no Eikō III: Kamigami no Chinmoku (2020, Nintendo Switch)
- Atomic Runner Chelnov (2020, Windows, iiRcade)
- Daito Yoshisume City (2021, iOS, Android)
- Windjammers 2 (2022, Dotemu, PlayStation 4, Windows, Xbox One, Nintendo Switch, Stadia)
- Klonoa Phantasy Reverie Series (2022, Bandai Namco Entertainment, Nintendo Switch, PlayStation 4, Xbox One, Windows, PlayStation 5, Xbox Series X/S)

== See also ==
- Suzak
- 8ing
- Nintendo Cube
- Dimps
- TOSE
- Good-Feel
